= 2017 Odds BK season =

Odd
2017 season
- Chairman: Tom Helge Rønning
- Manager: Dag-Eilev Fagermo
- Stadium: Skagerak Arena
- Tippeligaen: 6th
- Norwegian Cup: Fourth Round vs Sarpsborg 08
- Europa League: Third qualifying round vs Dinamo Zagreb
- Top goalscorer: League: Three Players (3); All: Stefan Mladenovic (7)
Home colours	Away colours	Third colours

Odds Ballklubb, commonly known as Odd, is a Norwegian football club from Skien. Originally the football section of a multi-sports club, founded in 1894 nine years after the club's founding. All other sports than football were discontinued and the club became dedicated to football only. Odd plays in the Norwegian top division, Tippeligaen, and holds the record winning the Norwegian Football Cup the most times, the last coming in 2000. The club was known as Odd Grenland between 1994 and 2012. During the 2017 season the club will be participating in the Tippeliean, NM Cupen and UEFA Europa League.

== Squad ==
Note: Flags indicate national team as defined under FIFA eligibility rules; some limited exceptions apply. Players may hold more than one non-FIFA nationality.

No.	Pos.	Nation	Player
1	GK	NOR	Sondre Rossbach
2	DF	NOR	Espen Ruud
4	DF	NOR	Vegard Bergan
5	DF	NOR	Thomas Grøgaard
6	MF	NOR	Oliver Berg
7	MF	SWE	Martin Broberg
8	MF	NOR	Jone Samuelsen
9	FW	NOR	Torbjørn Agdestein
10	FW	CAN	Olivier Occéan
11	FW	KOS	Elba Rashani
12	GK	NOR	Viljar Myhra
13	MF	NOR	Stefan Mladenovic

No.	Pos.	Nation	Player
14	MF	NOR	Fredrik Nordkvelle
15	MF	NOR	Sigurd Hauso Haugen
16	DF	NOR	Fredrik Semb Berge
17	MF	NOR	Eric Kitolano
18	DF	NOR	Joakim Våge Nilsen
19	MF	CAN	Zakaria Messoudi
21	DF	NOR	Steffen Hagen (Captain)
22	MF	NOR	Erik Eikeng
24	FW	FIN	Riku Riski
25	MF	NOR	John Kitolano
27	FW	SEN	Pape Pate Diouf
29	MF	NOR	Markus Andre Kaasa

== Transfers ==
=== Winter ===
In: Note: Flags indicate national team as defined under FIFA eligibility rules; some limited exceptions apply. Players may hold more than one non-FIFA nationality.

No.	Pos.	Nation	Player
7	MF	SWE	Martin Broberg (from (Sweden) Örebro)
9	FW	NOR	Torbjørn Agdestein (from (Norway) Haugesund)
27	FW	SEN	Pape Paté Diouf (from (Norway) Molde)

Out: Note: Flags indicate national team as defined under FIFA eligibility rules; some limited exceptions apply. Players may hold more than one non-FIFA nationality.

No.	Pos.	Nation	Player
17	MF	NOR	Eric Kitolano
23	DF	NOR	Lars Kristian Eriksen
26	MF	NGR	Bentley (to (Turkey) Boluspor)
—	MF	NOR	Ole Jørgen Halvorsen (to (Norway) Sarpsborg 08, previously on loan at (Norway) Bodø/Glimt)

=== Summer ===
In: Note: Flags indicate national team as defined under FIFA eligibility rules; some limited exceptions apply. Players may hold more than one non-FIFA nationality.

No.	Pos.	Nation	Player
11	FW	KOS	Elba Rashani (from (Norway) Rosenborg)
20	MF	NOR	Etzaz Hussain (on loan from (Norway) Molde)

Out: Note: Flags indicate national team as defined under FIFA eligibility rules; some limited exceptions apply. Players may hold more than one non-FIFA nationality.

No.	Pos.	Nation	Player
3	MF	KOS	Ardian Gashi (to (Norway) Ørn-Horten)
11	MF	NOR	Rafik Zekhnini (to (Italy) Fiorentina)
20	MF	NOR	Fredrik Oldrup Jensen (to (Belgium) Zulte Waregem)

== Competitions ==
=== Eliteserien ===
==== Results summary ====
Overall								Home						Away					
Pld	W	D	L	GF	GA	GD	Pts	W	D	L	GF	GA	GD	W	D	L	GF	GA	GD
30	12	6	12	28	39	−11	42	10	2	3	18	13	+5	2	4	9	10	26	−16

Last updated: 26 November 2017.
Source: see below

==== Results by round ====
Round	1	2	3	4	5	6	7	8	9	10	11	12	13	14	15	16	17	18	19	20	21	22	23	24	25	26	27	28	29	30
Ground	A	H	A	H	A	H	A	H	A	H	A	H	A	A	H	H	H	A	H	A	H	A	A	H	A	H	A	H	A	H
Result	L	W	L	W	L	W	W	W	W	L	D	D	D	L	D	L	W	L	W	L	W	D	L	W	L	W	D	L	L	W
Position	16	12	14	9	11	7	4	2	2	5	4	4	4	7	8	10	6	9	7	8	6	6	7	7	7	7	7	7	9	6

Updated to match(es) played on 26 November 2017. Source: see below
A = Away; H = Home; W = Win; D = Draw; L = Loss

==== Results ====
2 April 2017 1	Rosenborg	3–0	Odd	Trondheim
20:00 CEST (UTC+2)	Gersbach (yellow card) 32'; Bendtner 57'; Semb Berge 58' (o.g.); Jevtović 69'	Report		Stadium: Lerkendal Stadion; Attendance: 16,804; Referee: Tore Hansen

5 April 2017 2	Odd	2–0	Kristiansund	Skien
19:00 CEST (UTC+2)	Nilsen (yellow card) 17'; Occéan 22'; Broberg (yellow card) 35'; Grøgaard 60'; Ruud (yellow card) 90'	Report		Stadium: Skagerak Arena; Attendance: 9,049; Referee: Martin Lundby

9 April 2017 3	Stabæk	2–0	Odd	Bærum
18:00 CEST (UTC+2)	Brochmann 74'; Granli (yellow card) 90+3'; Kassi 90+4'	Report		Stadium: Nadderud Stadion; Attendance: 3,721; Referee: Trond Ivar Døvle

17 April 2017 4	Odd	1–0	Tromsø	Skien
20:00 CEST (UTC+2)	Riski 6'; Berge (yellow card) 18'; Zekhnini (red card) 88'	Report		Stadium: Skagerak Arena; Attendance: 6,272; Referee: Svein Oddvar Moen

23 April 2017 5	Viking	3–0	Odd	Stavanger
18:00 CEST (UTC+2)	Adegbenro 27'; Mets (yellow card) 54'; Bringaker 58'; Danielsen 62' (pen.)	Report	Ruud (yellow card) 41'	Stadium: Viking Stadion; Attendance: 6,914; Referee: Trygve Kjensli

30 April 2017 6	Odd	2–1	Vålerenga	Skien
20:00 CEST (UTC+2)	Diouf 32' (yellow card) 82'; Nordkvelle 42'	Report	Berntsen (yellow card) 61'; Zahid (yellow card) 69'	Stadium: Skagerak Arena; Attendance: 7,673; Referee: Tom Harald Hagen

8 May 2017 7	Lillestrøm	0–1	Odd	Lillestrøm
19:00 CEST (UTC+2)	Kippe (yellow card) 60'; Ajeti (yellow card) 88'	Report	Occéan 76'; Ruud (yellow card) 85'; Diouf (yellow card) 87'	Stadium: Åråsen Stadion; Attendance: 4,527; Referee: Ola Hobber Nilsen

13 May 2017 8	Odd	2–0	Strømsgodset	Skien
18:00 CEST (UTC+2)	Riski 58'; Jensen 65'	Report	Hauger (yellow card) 7'	Stadium: Skagerak Arena; Attendance: 6,994; Referee: Trond Ivar Døvle

16 May 2017 9	Haugesund	0–2	Odd	Haugesund
18:00 CEST (UTC+2)	Hajradinović (yellow card) 45'	Report	Ruud 29', 51' (yellow card) 45+1'; Occéan (yellow card) 39'	Stadium: Haugesund Stadion; Attendance: 4,342; Referee: Espen Eskås

21 May 2017 10	Odd	1–2	Molde	Skien
20:00 CEST (UTC+2)	Ruud (yellow card) 79'; Berg 90+3'	Report	Hestad (yellow card) 41'; Aursnes 53'; Ssewankambo (yellow card) 70'; Gabrielsen 90+5'	Stadium: Skagerak Arena; Attendance: 7,146; Referee: Tom Harald Hagen

27 May 2017 11	Sandefjord	0–0	Odd	Sandefjord
18:00 CEST (UTC+2)	Jónsson (yellow card) 90+4'	Report	Occéan (yellow card) 90+4'	Stadium: Komplett Arena; Attendance: 3,736; Referee: Trond Ivar Døvle

4 June 2017 12	Odd	0–0	Brann	Skien
20:00 CEST (UTC+2)	Zekhnini (yellow card) 59'	Report		Stadium: Skagerak Arena; Attendance: 7,828; Referee: Tore Hansen

18 June 2017 13	Sogndal	0–0	Odd	Sogndalsfjøra
18:00 CEST (UTC+2)	Schulze (yellow card) 18'; Ramsland (yellow card) 40'; Hove (yellow card) 68'	Report	Semb Berge (yellow card) 73'	Stadium: Fosshaugane Campus; Attendance: 2,459; Referee: Kristoffer Hagenes

25 June 2017 14	Aalesund	5–1	Odd	Ålesund
18:00 CEST (UTC+2)	Veldwijk 11', 64', 74'; Berge 18' (o.g.); Abdellaoue 33' (pen.); Grétarsson (yellow card) 56'	Report	Nordkvelle (yellow card) 11'; Berge (red card) 32'; Riski (yellow card) 37'; Zekhnini 42'; Samuelsen (yellow card) 59'	Stadium: Color Line Stadion; Attendance: 5,537; Referee: Trygve Kjensli

2 July 2017 15	Odd	0–0	Sarpsborg 08	Skien
18:00 CEST (UTC+2)	Riski (yellow card) 25'	Report	Thomassen (yellow card) 16'; Lindberg (yellow card) 37'	Stadium: Skagerak Arena; Attendance: 7,201; Referee: Tore Hansen

9 July 2017 16	Tromsø	v	Odd	Tromsø
18:00 CEST (UTC+2)				Stadium: Alfheim Stadion

16 July 2017 17	Odd	0–2	Viking	Skien
18:00 CEST (UTC+2)	Zekhnini (yellow card) 61'; Diouf (yellow card) 71'	Report	Adegbenro 6', 24'	Stadium: Skagerak Arena; Attendance: 6,780; Referee: Kristoffer Hagenes

6 August 2017 18	Odd	2–1	Sogndal	Skien
18:00 CEST (UTC+2)	Broberg 3'; Samuelsen 26' (pen.)	Report	Schulze 79'	Stadium: Skagerak Arena; Attendance: 6,433; Referee: Tore Hansen

13 August 2017 19	Brann	0–2	Odd	Bergen
18:00 CEST (UTC+2)	Rólantsson 30'; Acosta (yellow card) 53'; Barmen 58' (yellow card) 78'	Report		Stadium: Brann Stadion; Attendance: 10,019; Referee: Svein Odvar Moen

20 August 2017 20	Odd	1–0	Sandefjord	Skien
18:00 CEST (UTC+2)	Nilsen (yellow card) 43'; Hussain 73'; Samuelsen (yellow card) 80'	Report	Bindia (yellow card) 60' (yellow-red card) 75'	Stadium: Skagerak Arena; Attendance: 7,546; Referee: Ola Hobber Nilsen

11 September 2017 21	Molde	2–1	Odd	Molde
19:00 CEST (UTC+2)	Strand 49'; Sarr (yellow card) 58'; Amang 90'	Report	Rashani (yellow card) 19'; Riski (yellow card) 45'; Samuelsen 59' (pen.); Hagen (yellow card) 90+4'	Stadium: Aker Stadion; Attendance: 6,851; Referee: Espen Eskås

18 September 2017 22	Odd	3–2	Aalesund	Skien
19:00 CEST (UTC+2)	Samuelsen 5' (pen.) (yellow card) 57'; Grétarsson 20' (o.g.); Rashani 47' (yellow card) 61'	Report	Abdellaoue 62' (pen.); Carlsen (yellow card) 63'; Berge 68' (o.g.); Riise (yellow card) 69'; Papazoglou (yellow card) 74'; Ramsteijn (yellow card) 85'	Stadium: Skagerak Arena; Attendance: 6,854; Referee: Espen Eskås

21 September 2017 16	Tromsø	2–2	Odd	Tromsø
18:00 CEST (UTC+2)	Bakenga 29' (yellow card) 65'; Wangberg 60'; Antonsen (yellow card) 76'	Report	Berge 32'; Broberg (yellow card) 81'; Hussain 87' (pen.)	Stadium: Alfheim Stadion; Attendance: 3,461; Referee: Trygve Kjensli

25 September 2017 23	Sarpsborg 08	2–1	Odd	Sarpsborg
19:00 CEST (UTC+2)	Halvorsen 31' (pen.); Zachariassen 48' (yellow card) 82'	Report	Samuelsen (yellow card) 45+1'; Rashani 53'	Stadium: Sarpsborg Stadion; Attendance: 4,365; Referee: Rohit Saggi

1 October 2017 24	Odd	1–0	Haugesund	Skien
18:00 CEST (UTC+2)	Hussain 44'; Berge (yellow card) 51'	Report	Gytkjær (yellow card) 63'; Ćosić (yellow card) 71'	Stadium: Skagerak Arena; Attendance: 6,899; Referee: Kristoffer Hagenes

14 October 2017 25	Strømsgodset	1–0	Odd	Drammen
18:00 CEST (UTC+2)	Andersen 74'	Report	Berge (yellow card) 78'; Hussain (yellow card) 90+2'	Stadium: Marienlyst Stadion; Attendance: 6,027; Referee: Trygve Kjensli

23 October 2017 26	Odd	1–0	Lillestrøm	Skien
19:00 CEST (UTC+2)	Hussain (penalty missed) 25'; Haugen 44'; Samuelsen (yellow card) 54'	Report	Krogstad (penalty missed) 55'; Rafn (yellow card) 90'	Stadium: Skagerak Arena; Attendance: 6,164; Referee: Espen Eskås

29 October 2017 27	Kristiansund	2–2	Odd	Kristiansund
18:00 CET (UTC+1)	Bamba 19'; Gjertsen 46'	Report	Haugen 3'; Nilsen (yellow card) 32'; Ruud 89'	Stadium: Kristiansund Stadion; Attendance: 3,822; Referee: Martin Lundby

5 November 2017 28	Odd	0–5	Stabæk	Skien
18:00 CET (UTC+1)	Rashani (yellow card) 34'	Report	Lumanza 18'; Boli 20', 23'; Vetlesen (yellow card) 28'; Brochmann 38'; Brynhildsen 83'	Stadium: Skagerak Arena; Attendance: 6,315; Referee: Dag Vidar Hafsås

19 November 2017 29	Vålerenga	2–0	Odd	Oslo
18:00 CET (UTC+1)	Ejuke 8'; Lekven 49'; Stengel (yellow card) 89'	Report	J.Kitolano (yellow card) 54'	Stadium: Intility Arena; Attendance: 12,236; Referee: Tore Hansen

26 November 2017 30	Odd	1–0	Rosenborg	Skien
18:00 CET (UTC+1)	Samuelsen (yellow card) 30'; Mladenovic 53'; Rashani (yellow card) 68'	Report		Stadium: Skagerak Arena; Attendance: 7,438; Referee: Trond Ivar Døvle

==== Table ====
Pos	Team	Pld	W	D	L	GF	GA	GD	Pts
4	Strømsgodset	30	14	8	8	45	37	+8	50
5	Brann	30	13	8	9	51	36	+15	47
6	Odd	30	12	6	12	27	39	−12	42
7	Kristiansund	30	10	10	10	44	46	−2	40
8	Vålerenga	30	11	6	13	48	46	+2	39

Source: Football Association of Norway (in Norwegian), Soccerway
Rules for classification: 1) Points; 2) Goal difference; 3) Goals scored; 4) Head-to-head points; 5) Head-to-head goal difference; 6) Head-to-head away goals scored (only if between two teams); 7) Head-to-head goals scored; 8) Play-off (only used to decide champions or relegation).

=== Norwegian Cup ===
26 April 2017 First Round	Hei	0–10	Odd	Heistad
18:00 CEST (UTC+2)		Report	Agdestein 10', 27', 61'; Mladenovic 13', 90+2'; Berg 43', 88'; Riski 55', 74'; Haugen 84'	Stadium: Mortens Plass; Attendance: 2,218; Referee: Marius Lien

24 May 2017 Second Round	Pors Grenland	1–3	Odd	Porsgrunn
18:00 CEST (UTC+2)	Lauritsen 45'	Report	Riski 23'; Jensen 50'; Berg 89'	Stadium: Pors Stadion; Attendance: 3,114; Referee: Adrian Gjendemsjø

31 May 2017 Third Round	Flekkerøy	0–3	Odd	Flekkerøy
19:15 CEST (UTC+2)	M.Hallandvik (yellow card) 85'	Report	Berg 21', 50'; Mladenovic 64' (yellow card) 90+3'; Nilsen (yellow card) 74'	Stadium: Flekkerøy Stadion; Attendance: 1,852; Referee: Steinar Hauge

9 August 2017 Fourth Round	Sarpsborg 08	4–0	Odd	Sarpsborg
18:30 CEST (UTC+2)	Rossbach 38', 41' (o.g.); Diatta 47'; Trondsen 52'	Report		Stadium: Sarpsborg Stadion; Attendance: 2,650; Referee: Espen Eskås

=== UEFA Europa League ===
==== Qualifying rounds ====
29 June 2017 First qualifying round 1st leg	Odd (Norway)	3–0	(Northern Ireland) Ballymena United	Skien, Norway
20:45 CEST (UTC+2)	Mladenovic 1'; Diouf (yellow card) 36'; Broberg 53' (yellow card) 55'; Haugen 90+2'	Report	Flynn (yellow card) 43'; J.Ervin (yellow card) 55'	Stadium: Skagerak Arena; Attendance: 2,969; Referee: Edin Jakupović (Bosnia and Herzegovina)

6 July 2017 First qualifying round 2nd leg	Ballymena United (Northern Ireland)	0–2 (0–5 agg.)	(Norway) Odd	Belfast (Note: Ballymena United will play their home match at Seaview, Belfast, instead of their regular stadium Ballymena Showgrounds, Ballymena.), Northern Ireland
20:45 CEST (UTC+2)	L.Millar (yellow card) 44'; C.Friel (yellow card) 54'	Report	L.Millar 79' (o.g.); Haugen 88'	Stadium: Seaview; Attendance: 1,792; Referee: Radek Příhoda (Czech Republic)

13 July 2017 Second qualifying round 1st leg	Vaduz (Liechtenstein)	0–1	(Norway) Odd	Vaduz, Liechtenstein
19:00 CEST (UTC+2)	N.Von Niederhäusern (yellow card) 89'	Report	Occéan 42'	Stadium: Rheinpark Stadion; Attendance: 1,043; Referee: Antti Munukka (Finland)

20 July 2017 Second qualifying round 2nd leg	Odd (Norway)	1–0 (2–0 agg.)	(Liechtenstein) Vaduz	Skien, Norway
CEST (UTC+2)	Mladenovic 82'	Report	Bühler (yellow card) 67'	Stadium: Skagerak Arena; Attendance: 2,492; Referee: Aleksandar Vasić (Serbia)

27 July 2017 Third qualifying round 1st leg	Dinamo Zagreb (Croatia)	2–1	(Norway) Odd	Zagreb, Croatia
20:45 CEST (UTC+2)	Hodžić 31'; Fernandes 41'; Stojanović (yellow card) 73'; Soudani (yellow card) 86'	Report	Mladenovic 20'	Stadium: Stadion Maksimir; Attendance: 7,080; Referee: Manuel Schüttengruber (Austria)

3 August 2017 Third qualifying round 2nd leg	Odd (Norway)	0–0 (1–2 agg.)	(Croatia) Dinamo Zagreb	Skien, Norway
18:30 CEST (UTC+2)	Mladenovic (yellow card) 35'; Samuelsen (yellow card) 56'; Diouf (yellow card) 84'	Report	Moro (yellow card) 27'; Soudani (yellow card) 50'; Sigali (yellow card) 53'; Olmo (yellow card) 81' (yellow-red card) 86'	Stadium: Skagerak Arena; Attendance: Referee: Anatoliy Abdula (Ukraine)

== Squad statistics ==
As of match played 26 November 2017

=== Appearances and goals ===
No.	Pos	Nat	Player	Total		Tippeligaen		Norwegian Cup		UEFA Europa League	
No.	Pos	Nat	Player	Apps	Goals	Apps	Goals	Apps	Goals	Apps	Goals
1	GK	(Norway) NOR	Sondre Rossbach	29	0	23	0	1	0	5	0
2	DF	(Norway) NOR	Espen Ruud	37	3	28	3	3	0	6	0
4	DF	(Norway) NOR	Vegard Bergan	21	0	14+2	0	3+1	0	1	0
5	DF	(Norway) NOR	Thomas Grøgaard	30	1	23+1	1	3	0	3	0
6	MF	(Norway) NOR	Oliver Berg	31	6	17+8	1	3	5	1+2	0
7	MF	(Sweden) SWE	Martin Broberg	25	2	12+7	1	1	0	3+2	1
8	MF	(Norway) NOR	Jone Samuelsen	28	3	19+1	3	2	0	6	0
9	FW	(Norway) NOR	Torbjørn Agdestein	12	3	5+3	0	3	3	0+1	0
10	FW	(Canada) CAN	Olivier Occéan	32	3	14+10	2	1+1	0	6	1
11	FW	(Kosovo) KOS	Elba Rashani	13	2	13	2	0	0	0	0
12	GK	(Norway) NOR	Viljar Myhra	9	0	5	0	3	0	1	0
13	MF	(Norway) NOR	Stefan Mladenovic	31	7	3+20	1	4	3	3+1	3
14	MF	(Norway) NOR	Fredrik Nordkvelle	26	1	17+4	1	0+1	0	3+1	0
15	MF	(Norway) NOR	Sigurd Hauso Haugen	20	5	10+5	2	1+1	1	0+3	2
16	DF	(Norway) NOR	Fredrik Semb Berge	25	1	18	1	1	0	6	0
17	MF	(Norway) NOR	Markus André Kaasa	2	0	1	0	0+1	0	0	0
18	DF	(Norway) NOR	Joakim Våge Nilsen	33	0	19+6	0	3	0	4+1	0
20	MF	(Norway) NOR	Etzaz Hussain	11	3	9+2	3	0	0	0	0
21	DF	(Norway) NOR	Steffen Hagen	36	0	27	0	4	0	5	0
22	MF	(Norway) NOR	Erik Eikeng	2	0	0	0	1+1	0	0	0
24	FW	(Finland) FIN	Riku Riski	32	5	20+3	2	4	3	4+1	0
25	MF	(Norway) NOR	John Kitolano	10	0	3+1	0	1+3	0	1+1	0
26	GK	(Norway) NOR	Anders Klemensson	2	0	2	0	0	0	0	0
27	FW	(Senegal) SEN	Pape Paté Diouf	19	1	7+6	1	0+1	0	3+2	0
Players away from Odd on loan:
Players who left Odd during the season:
11	FW	(Norway) NOR	Rafik Zekhnini	16	1	10+3	1	0+1	0	1+1	0
20	MF	(Norway) NOR	Fredrik Oldrup Jensen	20	2	11+2	1	2+1	1	4	0

=== Goal scorers ===
Place	Position	Nation	Number	Name	Tippeligaen	Norwegian Cup	UEFA Europa League	Total
1	MF	(Norway)	13	Stefan Mladenovic	1	3	3	7
2	MF	(Norway)	6	Oliver Berg	1	5	0	6
3	FW	(Finland)	24	Riku Riski	2	3	0	5
3	MF	(Norway)	15	Sigurd Hauso Haugen	2	1	2	5
5	MF	(Norway)	8	Jone Samuelsen	3	0	0	3
5	MF	(Norway)	20	Etzaz Hussain	3	0	0	3
5	DF	(Norway)	2	Espen Ruud	3	0	0	3
5	FW	(Canada)	10	Olivier Occéan	2	0	1	3
5	FW	(Norway)	9	Torbjørn Agdestein	0	3	0	3
10	FW	(Kosovo)	11	Elba Rashani	2	0	0	2
10	MF	(Norway)	20	Fredrik Oldrup Jensen	1	1	0	2
10	MF	(Sweden)	7	Martin Broberg	1	0	1	2
10				Own goal	1	0	1	2
14	DF	(Norway)	5	Thomas Grøgaard	1	0	0	1
14	FW	(Senegal)	27	Pape Paté Diouf	1	0	0	1
14	MF	(Norway)	14	Fredrik Nordkvelle	1	0	0	1
14	FW	(Norway)	11	Rafik Zekhnini	1	0	0	1
14	DF	(Norway)	16	Fredrik Semb Berge	1	0	0	1
				TOTALS	27	16	8	51

=== Disciplinary record ===
Number	Nation	Position	Name	Tippeligaen		Norwegian Cup		UEFA Europa League		Total	
Number	Nation	Position	Name	Yellow card	Red card	Yellow card	Red card	Yellow card	Red card	Yellow card	Red card
2	(Norway)	DF	Espen Ruud	5	0	0	0	0	0	5	0
7	(Sweden)	MF	Martin Broberg	2	0	0	0	1	0	3	0
8	(Norway)	MF	Jone Samuelsen	6	0	0	0	1	0	7	0
10	(Canada)	FW	Olivier Occéan	2	0	0	0	0	0	2	0
11	(Norway)	MF	Rafik Zekhnini	6	1	0	0	0	0	6	1
13	(Norway)	MF	Stefan Mladenovic	0	0	1	0	1	0	2	0
14	(Norway)	MF	Fredrik Nordkvelle	1	0	0	0	0	0	1	0
16	(Norway)	DF	Fredrik Semb Berge	4	1	0	0	0	0	4	1
18	(Norway)	DF	Joakim Våge Nilsen	3	0	0	0	0	0	3	0
20	(Norway)	MF	Etzaz Hussain	1	0	0	0	0	0	1	0
21	(Norway)	DF	Steffen Hagen	1	0	0	0	0	0	1	0
24	(Finland)	FW	Riku Riski	3	0	0	0	0	0	3	0
25	(Norway)	MF	John Kitolano	1	0	0	0	0	0	1	0
27	(Senegal)	FW	Pape Paté Diouf	3	0	0	0	2	0	5	0
			TOTALS	38	2	1	0	5	0	44	2
