= 2019 Odds BK season =

Odd
2019 season
- President: Trond Haukvik
- Manager: Dag-Eilev Fagermo
- Stadium: Skagerak Arena
- Eliteserien: 4th
- Norwegian Cup: Semi-final vs Haugesund
- Top goalscorer: League: Torgeir Børven (21); All: Torgeir Børven (23)
Home colours	Away colours

The 2019 season was Odd's eleventh continuous season in the Eliteserien since winning the 1. divisjon in 2008.

== Squad ==
Note: Flags indicate national team as defined under FIFA eligibility rules; some limited exceptions apply. Players may hold more than one non-FIFA nationality.

No.	Pos.	Nation	Player
1	GK	NOR	Sondre Rossbach
2	DF	NOR	Espen Ruud
3	DF	NOR	Fredrik Semb Berge
5	DF	NOR	Birk Risa
6	MF	NOR	Vebjørn Hoff
7	MF	NOR	Fredrik Oldrup Jensen (on loan from Zulte Waregem)
8	MF	NOR	Jone Samuelsen
10	FW	NOR	Moussa Njie (on loan from FK Partizan)
11	MF	KOS	Elbasan Rashani
12	GK	NOR	Egil Selvik
13	DF	NOR	Kevin Egell-Johnsen
14	MF	NOR	Fredrik Nordkvelle

No.	Pos.	Nation	Player
15	FW	NOR	Filip Delaveris
16	MF	NOR	Joshua Kitolano
17	MF	NOR	Markus Andreas Kaasa
18	DF	NOR	Odin Bjørtuft
19	MF	NOR	Bilal Njie
20	FW	NOR	Tobias Lauritsen
21	DF	NOR	Steffen Hagen (Captain)
22	FW	NOR	Torgeir Børven
23	MF	NOR	Marius Larsen
24	FW	NOR	André Sødlund
31	FW	NOR	Andreas Helmersen (on loan from Rosenborg)

== Transfers ==
=== Winter ===
In: Note: Flags indicate national team as defined under FIFA eligibility rules; some limited exceptions apply. Players may hold more than one non-FIFA nationality.

No.	Pos.	Nation	Player
7	MF	NOR	Fredrik Oldrup Jensen (on loan from (Belgium) Zulte Waregem)
10	FW	NOR	Sander Svendsen (on loan from (Sweden) Hammarby)
12	GK	NOR	Egil Selvik (from (Norway) Sandnes Ulf)
31	FW	NOR	Andreas Helmersen (on loan from (Norway) Rosenborg)

Out: Note: Flags indicate national team as defined under FIFA eligibility rules; some limited exceptions apply. Players may hold more than one non-FIFA nationality.

No.	Pos.	Nation	Player
4	DF	NOR	Vegard Bergan (to (Norway) Bodø/Glimt)
7	MF	SWE	Martin Broberg (to (Sweden) Örebro)
12	GK	NOR	Viljar Myhra (to (Norway) Strømsgodset)
13	MF	NOR	Stefan Mladenovic (to (Norway) Sandefjord)
15	DF	NOR	Andreas Nordvik (released)

=== Summer ===
In: Note: Flags indicate national team as defined under FIFA eligibility rules; some limited exceptions apply. Players may hold more than one non-FIFA nationality.

No.	Pos.	Nation	Player
10	MF	NOR	Moussa Njie (on loan from (Serbia) Partizan)
13	DF	NOR	Kevin Egell-Johnsen (promoted from junior squad)

Out: Note: Flags indicate national team as defined under FIFA eligibility rules; some limited exceptions apply. Players may hold more than one non-FIFA nationality.

No.	Pos.	Nation	Player
10	FW	NOR	Sander Svendsen (loan return to (Sweden) Hammarby)
—	FW	NOR	Andreas Helmersen (loan return to (Norway) Rosenborg)

== Competitions ==
=== Eliteserien ===
==== Results summary ====
Overall								Home						Away					
Pld	W	D	L	GF	GA	GD	Pts	W	D	L	GF	GA	GD	W	D	L	GF	GA	GD
30	15	7	8	45	40	+5	52	12	3	0	31	14	+17	3	4	8	14	26	−12

Last updated: 1 December 2019.
Source: see below

==== Results by round ====
Round	1	2	3	4	5	6	7	8	9	10	11	12	13	14	15	16	17	18	19	20	21	22	23	24	25	26	27	28	29	30
Ground	H	A	H	H	A	H	A	H	A	H	A	H	A	H	A	H	A	H	A	H	A	H	A	H	A	A	H	A	H	A
Result	W	D	W	W	L	W	W	W	W	W	L	W	L	D	L	W	D	D	D	W	L	W	W	D	L	D	W	L	W	L
Position	4	4	3	2	3	3	2	1	1	1	1	1	2	2	3	3	3	3	3	3	3	3	3	3	3	3	3	3	3	4

Updated to match(es) played on 1 December 2019. Source: see below
A = Away; H = Home; W = Win; D = Draw; L = Loss

==== Results ====
30 March 2019 1	Odd	3–2	Brann	Skien
15:30 CEST (UTC+2)	Hoff 45'; Børven 46', 68'	Report	Wormgoor 2', 76' (pen.)	Stadium: Skagerak Arena; Attendance: 7.295; Referee: Espen Eskås

8 April 2019 2	Rosenborg	1–1	Odd	Trondheim
19:00 CEST (UTC+2)	Helland 44'	Report	Børven 54'	Stadium: Lerkendal Stadion; Attendance: 11.723; Referee: Tommy Skjerven

14 April 2019 3	Odd	2–0	Kristiansund	Skien
18:00 CEST (UTC+2)	Rashani 19'; Børven 56'	Report		Stadium: Skagerak Arena; Attendance: 4.608; Referee: Trygve Kjensli

23 April 2019 4	Odd	1–0	Viking	Skien
19:00 CEST (UTC+2)	Kaasa 54'	Report		Stadium: Skagerak Arena; Attendance: 4.775; Referee: Tom Harald Hagen

29 April 2019 5	Vålerenga	1–0	Odd	Oslo
19:00 CEST (UTC+2)	Dønnum 90+2'	Report		Stadium: Intility Arena; Attendance: 6.766; Referee: Mathias Smehus Kringstad

5 May 2019 6	Odd	2–1	Strømsgodset	Skien
18:00 CEST (UTC+2)	Hagen 24'; Børven 90+3'	Report	Abdellaoue 77'	Stadium: Skagerak Arena; Attendance: 5.252; Referee: Trond Ivar Døvle

12 May 2019 7	Tromsø	1–2	Odd	Tromsø
18:00 CEST (UTC+2)	Espejord 41'	Report	Kitolano 75'; Børven 84'	Stadium: Alfheim Stadion; Attendance: 2.514; Referee: Dag Vidar Hafsås

16 May 2019 8	Odd	1–0	Ranheim	Skien
18:00 CEST (UTC+2)	Rashani 78'	Report		Stadium: Skagerak Arena; Attendance: 6.289; Referee: Rohit Saggi

19 May 2019 9	Lillestrøm	0–3	Odd	Lillestrøm
18:00 CEST (UTC+2)		Report	Børven 2' (pen.); Hagen 47'; Pedersen 65' (o.g.)	Stadium: Åråsen Stadion; Attendance: 4.439; Referee: Tore Hansen

16 June 2019 11	Sarpsborg 08	2–0	Odd	Sarpsborg
18:00 CEST (UTC+2)	Strand Larsen 21', 48'	Report		Stadium: Sarpsborg Stadion; Attendance: 5.515; Referee: Ola Hobber Nilsen

23 June 2019 12	Odd	3–1	Haugesund	Skien
18:00 CEST (UTC+2)	Nordkvelle 36', 71'; Børven 60'	Report	Leite 52'	Stadium: Skagerak Arena; Attendance: 5.589; Referee: Espen Eskås

30 June 2019 13	Bodø/Glimt	3–0	Odd	Bodø
18:00 CEST (UTC+2)	Evjen 30'; Saltnes 70'; Zinckernagel 84'	Report		Stadium: Aspmyra Stadion; Attendance: 3.442; Referee: Trygve Kjensli

5 July 2019 14	Odd	2–2	Molde	Skien
19:00 CEST (UTC+2)	Nordkvelle 49'; Børven 87'	Report	James 22'; Omoijuanfo 28'	Stadium: Skagerak Arena; Attendance: 6.129; Referee: Ola Hobber Nilsen

10 July 2019 10	Odd	2–1	Stabæk	Skien
19:00 CEST (UTC+2)	Børven 10', 75'	Report	Braaten 13'	Stadium: Skagerak Arena; Attendance: 5.157; Referee: Dag Vidar Hafsås

14 July 2019 15	Mjøndalen	2–0	Odd	Mjøndalen
18:00 CEST (UTC+2)	Occéan 57'; Brochmann 83' (pen.)	Report		Stadium: Consto Arena; Attendance: 2.358; Referee: Trond Ivar Døvle

3 August 2019 16	Odd	2–1	Lillestrøm	Skien
18:00 CEST (UTC+2)	Rashani 65'; Børven 81'	Report	Ødemarksbakken 52'	Stadium: Skagerak Arena; Attendance: 4.720; Referee: Kristoffer Hagenes

11 August 2019 17	Kristiansund	1–1	Odd	Kristiansund
18:00 CEST (UTC+2)	Psyché 59'	Report	Børven 20'	Stadium: Kristiansund Stadion; Attendance: 4.016; Referee: Espen Eskås

17 August 2019 18	Odd	1–1	Rosenborg	Skien
18:00 CEST (UTC+2)	Risa 10'	Report	Hovland 60'	Stadium: Skagerak Arena; Attendance: 7.218; Referee: Tommy Skjerven

25 August 2019 19	Molde	2–2	Odd	Molde
18:00 CEST (UTC+2)	James 42'; Hestad 54'	Report	Børven 24', 69'	Stadium: Aker Stadion; Attendance: 6.843; Referee: Kai Erik Steen

30 August 2019 20	Odd	3–1	Bodø/Glimt	Skien
19:00 CEST (UTC+2)	Nordkvelle 12', 81'; Ruud 22'	Report	Saltnes 49'	Stadium: Skagerak Arena; Attendance: 6.118; Referee: Ola Hobber Nilsen

15 September 2019 21	Viking	2–0	Odd	Stavanger
18:00 CEST (UTC+2)	Tripić 9'; Torsteinbø 51'	Report		Stadium: Viking Stadion; Attendance: 7.519; Referee: Tommy Skjerven

22 September 2019 22	Odd	3–0	Sarpsborg 08	Skien
18:00 CEST (UTC+2)	Delaveris 30', 34'; Børven 58'	Report		Stadium: Skagerak Arena; Attendance: 5.496; Referee: Trygve Kjensli

29 September 2019 23	Strømsgodset	2–3	Odd	Drammen
18:00 CEST (UTC+2)	Mendy 16'; Fofana 84'	Report	Delaveris 11'; Hoff 27'; Børven 66'	Stadium: Marienlyst Stadion; Attendance: 5.001; Referee: Tom Harald Hagen

5 October 2019 24	Odd	1–1	Vålerenga	Skien
18:00 CEST (UTC+2)	Risa 90+3'	Report	Finne 56'	Stadium: Skagerak Arena; Attendance: 5,362; Referee: Trygve Kjensli

20 October 2019 25	Ranheim	4–1	Odd	Trondheim
18:00 CEST (UTC+2)	Kvande 9'; Olsen Øveraas 34'; Karlsen 84', 86'	Report	Børven 30'	Stadium: EXTRA Arena; Attendance: 5.001; Referee: Tom Harald Hagen

27 October 2019 26	Stabæk	0–0	Odd	Bærum
18:00 CET (UTC+1)		Report		Stadium: Nadderud Stadion; Attendance: 3.082; Referee: Dag Vidar Hafsås

4 November 2019 27	Odd	3–2	Mjøndalen	Skien
18:00 CET (UTC+1)	Børven 45', 78' (pen.); Faye Lund 84' (o.g.)	Report	Brochmann 24'; Dragsnes 72'	Stadium: Skagerak Arena; Attendance: 4.492; Referee: Trygve Kjensli

8 November 2019 28	Brann	1–0	Odd	Bergen
19:00 CET (UTC+1)	Bamba 74'	Report		Stadium: Brann Stadion; Attendance: 8.693; Referee: Tommy Skjerven

24 November 2019 29	Odd	2–1	Tromsø	Skien
18:00 CET (UTC+1)	Børven 43'; Oldrup Jensen 61'	Report	Andersen 80'	Stadium: Skagerak Arena; Attendance: 5.478; Referee: Espen Eskås

1 December 2019 30	Haugesund	4–1	Odd	Haugesund
18:00 CET (UTC+1)	Sandberg 22' (pen.); Velde 61'; Desler 65'; Koné 89'	Report	Kaasa 27'	Stadium: Haugesund Stadion; Attendance: 3.358; Referee: Kristoffer Hagenes

==== Table ====
Pos	Team	Pld	W	D	L	GF	GA	GD	Pts	Qualification or relegation
2	Bodø/Glimt	30	15	9	6	64	44	+20	54	Qualification for the Europa League first qualifying round
3	Rosenborg	30	14	10	6	53	41	+12	52	Qualification for the Europa League first qualifying round
4	Odd	30	15	7	8	45	40	+5	52	
5	Viking	30	13	8	9	55	42	+13	47	Qualification for the Europa League second qualifying round (Note: Viking qualified for the Europa League second qualifying round as winners of the 2019 Norwegian Cup.)
6	Kristiansund	30	11	8	11	41	41	0	41	

Source: Football Association of Norway (in Norwegian), Soccerway
Rules for classification: 1) Points; 2) Goal difference; 3) Goals scored; 4) Head-to-head points; 5) Head-to-head goal difference; 6) Head-to-head away goals scored (only if between two teams); 7) Head-to-head goals scored; 8) Play-off (only used to decide champions or relegation).

=== Norwegian Cup ===
2 May 2019 First Round	Storm	2–7	Odd	Skien
18:00 CEST (UTC+2)	Pedersen 56'; Hagen 78'	Report	Lauritsen 35', 74', 90' (pen.); Kitolano 38'; Samuelsen 39'; Delaveris 53'; Hoff 81'	Stadium: Bratsberg Kunstgress; Attendance: 1,928; Referee: Jon Romuld Håversen

22 May 2019 Second Round	Arendal	0–2	Odd	Arendal
18:00 CEST (UTC+2)		Report	Lauritsen 8'; Børven 85'	Stadium: Bjønnes Stadion; Attendance: 1,254; Referee: Marius Lien

19 June 2019 Third Round	Sandefjord	1–1 (a.e.t.) (1–3 p)	Odd	Sandefjord
18:00 CEST (UTC+2)	Grorud 38'	Report	Ruud 90'	Stadium: Komplett Arena; Attendance: 1,126; Referee: Trond Ivar Døvle
	Penalties
	Vallès (penalty missed); Mjelde (penalty scored); Kurtovic (penalty missed); Engblom (penalty missed)		(penalty scored) Ruud; (penalty missed) Lauritsen; (penalty scored) Børven; (penalty scored) Fredrik Nordkvelle

26 June 2019 Fourth Round	Kristiansund	1–2 (a.e.t.)	Odd	Kristiansund
18:00 CEST (UTC+2)	Sørli 76'	Report	Lauritsen 82'; Sander Svendsen 107'	Stadium: Kristiansund Stadion; Attendance: 2,216; Referee: Dag Vidar Hafsås

26 September 2019 Quarterfinal	KFUM	2–5	Odd	Oslo
18:00 CEST (UTC+2)	Tavakoli 32'; Olden Larsen 80'	Report	Børven 31'; Lauritsen 38'; Delaveris 74', 85'; Hoff 84'	Stadium: KFUM-Arena; Attendance: 2,236; Referee: Rohit Saggi

31 October 2019 Semifinal	Odd	0–3	Haugesund	Skien
20:00 CET (UTC+1)		Report	Sandberg 49' (pen.); Samuelsen 83'; Tronstad 89'	Stadium: Skagerak Arena; Attendance: 8,702; Referee: Tore Hansen
