= 2016 Odds BK season =

Odd
2016 season
- Chairman: Tom Helge Rønning
- Manager: Dag-Eilev Fagermo
- Stadium: Skagerak Arena
- Tippeligaen: 3rd
- Norwegian Cup: Fourth Round vs Tromsø
- Europa League: Second qualifying round vs PAS Giannina
- Top goalscorer: League: Olivier Occéan (10); All: Olivier Occéan (11)
| Home colours | Away colours | Third colours |

Odds Ballklubb, commonly known as Odd, is a Norwegian football club from Skien. Originally the football section of a multi-sports club, founded in 1894 nine years after the club's founding. All other sports than football were discontinued and the club became dedicated to football only. Odd plays in the Norwegian top division, Tippeligaen, and holds the record winning the Norwegian Football Cup the most times, the last coming in 2000. The club was known as Odd Grenland between 1994 and 2012. During the 2016 season the club will be participating in the Tippeliean, NM Cupen and UEFA Europa League.

== Squad ==
As of 27 July 2016

Note: Flags indicate national team as defined under FIFA eligibility rules; some limited exceptions apply. Players may hold more than one non-FIFA nationality.

| No. | Pos. | Nation | Player |
|---|---|---|---|
| 1 | GK | NOR | Sondre Rossbach |
| 2 | DF | NOR | Espen Ruud |
| 3 | MF | KOS | Ardian Gashi |
| 4 | DF | NOR | Vegard Bergan |
| 5 | DF | NOR | Thomas Grøgaard |
| 6 | MF | NOR | Oliver Berg |
| 7 | FW | NOR | Ole Jørgen Halvorsen |
| 8 | MF | NOR | Jone Samuelsen |
| 10 | FW | CAN | Olivier Occéan |
| 11 | MF | NOR | Rafik Zekhnini |
| 12 | GK | NOR | Viljar Myhra |
| 14 | MF | NOR | Fredrik Nordkvelle |

| No. | Pos. | Nation | Player |
|---|---|---|---|
| 15 | MF | NOR | Sigurd Hauso Haugen |
| 16 | DF | NOR | Fredrik Semb Berge |
| 17 | MF | NOR | Eric Kitolano |
| 18 | DF | NOR | Joakim Våge Nilsen |
| 19 | MF | CAN | Zakaria Messoudi |
| 20 | MF | NOR | Fredrik Oldrup Jensen |
| 21 | DF | NOR | Steffen Hagen (Captain) |
| 22 | MF | NOR | Erik Eikeng |
| 23 | DF | NOR | Lars Kristian Eriksen |
| 24 | FW | FIN | Riku Riski |
| 26 | FW | NGR | Bentley |

== Transfers ==
=== Winter ===
In: Note: Flags indicate national team as defined under FIFA eligibility rules; some limited exceptions apply. Players may hold more than one non-FIFA nationality.

| No. | Pos. | Nation | Player |
|---|---|---|---|
| 9 | FW | NOR | Henrik Kjelsrud Johansen (loan return from (Norway) Fredrikstad) |
| 15 | FW | NOR | Sigurd Haugen (from (Norway) Sandnes Ulf) |
| 16 | DF | NOR | Fredrik Semb Berge (from (Denmark) Brøndby) |
| 17 | MF | NOR | Eric Kitolano (Promoted) |
| 18 | DF | NOR | Joakim Våge Nilsen (from (Norway) Haugesund) |
| 22 | MF | NOR | Erik Eikeng (Promoted) |

Out: Note: Flags indicate national team as defined under FIFA eligibility rules; some limited exceptions apply. Players may hold more than one non-FIFA nationality.

| No. | Pos. | Nation | Player |
|---|---|---|---|
| 9 | FW | SEN | Pape Paté Diouf (loan return to (Norway) Molde) |
| 11 | FW | NOR | Frode Johnsen (retired) |
| 12 | FW | NOR | Ulrik Flo (to (Denmark) Silkeborg) |
| 16 | MF | NOR | Jonathan Lindseth (released) |
| 18 | DF | FIN | Jarkko Hurme (to (Finland) SJK Seinäjoki) |
| 19 | DF | NOR | Emil Jonassen (to (Norway) Bodø/Glimt) |
| 22 | MF | NOR | Håvard Storbæk (to (Norway) Sandefjord) |
| 25 | MF | NOR | Mathias Fredriksen (to (Norway) Mjøndalen) |

=== Summer ===
In: Note: Flags indicate national team as defined under FIFA eligibility rules; some limited exceptions apply. Players may hold more than one non-FIFA nationality.

| No. | Pos. | Nation | Player |
|---|---|---|---|
| 13 | MF | NOR | Stefan Mladenovic (from (Norway) Pors Grenland) |
| 24 | FW | FIN | Riku Riski (from (Norway) Rosenborg) |

Out: Note: Flags indicate national team as defined under FIFA eligibility rules; some limited exceptions apply. Players may hold more than one non-FIFA nationality.

| No. | Pos. | Nation | Player |
|---|---|---|---|
| 9 | FW | NOR | Henrik Kjelsrud Johansen (to (Norway) Vålerenga) |

== Competitions ==
=== Tippeligaen ===
==== Results summary ====
| Overall | | | | | | | | Home | | | | | | Away | | | | | |
| Pld | W | D | L | GF | GA | GD | Pts | W | D | L | GF | GA | GD | W | D | L | GF | GA | GD |
|---|---|---|---|---|---|---|---|---|---|---|---|---|---|---|---|---|---|---|---|
| 30 | 15 | 6 | 9 | 44 | 35 | +9 | 51 | 8 | 3 | 4 | 24 | 16 | +8 | 7 | 3 | 5 | 20 | 19 | +1 |

Last updated: 9 November 2016.
Source: see below

==== Results by round ====
| Round | 1 | 2 | 3 | 4 | 5 | 6 | 7 | 8 | 9 | 10 | 11 | 12 | 13 | 14 | 15 | 16 | 17 | 18 | 19 | 20 | 21 | 22 | 23 | 24 | 25 | 26 | 27 | 28 | 29 | 30 |
|---|---|---|---|---|---|---|---|---|---|---|---|---|---|---|---|---|---|---|---|---|---|---|---|---|---|---|---|---|---|---|
| Ground | H | A | H | A | H | A | H | A | H | B | H | A | H | A | H | A | H | H | A | H | A | H | A | H | A | A | H | A | H | A |
| Result | W | D | D | W | W | W | L | W | W | L | W | D | W | W | W | L | D | L | W | D | L | L | W | L | D | L | W | W | W | L |
| Position | 4 | 5 | 7 | 3 | 2 | 3 | 3 | 2 | 2 | 3 | 3 | 3 | 2 | 2 | 2 | 2 | 2 | 2 | 2 | 2 | 2 | 2 | 2 | 3 | 3 | 3 | 3 | 3 | 3 | 3 |

Updated to match(es) played on 9 November 2016. Source: see below
A = Away; H = Home; B = Bye; W = Win; D = Draw; L = Loss

==== Results ====
| 12 March 2016 1 | Odd | 1–0 | Rosenborg | Skien |
| 18:00 CEST (UTC+2) | Ruud (yellow card) 6'; Nordkvelle 30'; Jensen (yellow card) 45' | Summary | Reginiussen (yellow card) 62' | Stadium: Skagerak Arena; Attendance: 9,144; Referee: Tom Harald Hagen |

| 20 March 2016 2 | Brann | 0–0 | Odd | Bergen |
| 18:00 CEST (UTC+2) | Demidov (yellow card) 26'; Skålevik (yellow card) 78' | Summary | Samuelsen (yellow card) 82' | Stadium: Brann Stadion; Attendance: 11,495; Referee: Tore Hansen |

| 3 April 2016 3 | Odd | 0–0 | Tromsø | Skien |
| 15:30 CEST (UTC+2) | Bentley (yellow card) 90'; Semb Berge (yellow card) 90' | Summary | Espejord (yellow card) 57'; Johansen (yellow card) 90' | Stadium: Skagerak Arena; Attendance: 7,002; Referee: Trond Ivar Døvle |

| 10 April 2016 4 | Viking | 0–2 | Odd | Stavanger |
| 20:00 CEST (UTC+2) | Abdullahi (yellow card) 29'; Ibrahim (yellow card) 65' | Summary | Bentley 13'; Zekhnini 25'; Berg (yellow card) 58'; Ruud (yellow card) 69' | Stadium: Viking Stadion; Attendance: 7,995; Referee: Tommy Skjerven |

| 17 April 2016 5 | Odd | 3–0 | Start | Skien |
| 20:00 CEST (UTC+2) | Occean (penalty missed); Nordkvelle 32'; Berge 39', 69'; Ruud (yellow card) 89' | Summary | Kristjánsson (yellow card) 38'; Sandnes (yellow card) 89' | Stadium: Skagerak Arena; Attendance: 6,440; Referee: Kai Erik Steen |

| 20 April 2016 6 | Sogndal | 0–1 | Odd | Sogndalsfjøra |
| 19:00 CEST (UTC+2) | Koomson (yellow card) 32' | Summary | Samuelsen 53' (pen.) | Stadium: Fosshaugane Campus; Attendance: 2,688; Referee: Martin Lundby |

| 24 April 2016 7 | Odd | 1–3 | Lillestrøm | Skien |
| 18:00 CEST (UTC+2) | Nilsen 72' | Summary | Ofkir 35'; Jradi 49'; Origi (yellow card) 88'; Friday 90+1' | Stadium: Skagerak Arena; Attendance: 7,322; Referee: Trygve Kjensli |

| 1 May 2016 8 | Stabæk | 1–2 | Odd | Bærum |
| 20:00 CEST (UTC+2) | Mehmeti 2'; Meling (yellow card) 78' | Summary | Nordkvelle 5'; Bentley 41'; Jensen (yellow card) 60'; Samuelsen (yellow card) 69' | Stadium: Nadderud Stadion; Attendance: 3,301; Referee: Ken Henry Johansen |

| 8 May 2016 9 | Odd | 2–1 | Bodø/Glimt | Skien |
| 15:30 CEST (UTC+2) | Occéan 39', 79' | Summary | Jevtović 71' | Stadium: Skagerak Arena; Attendance: 7,221; Referee: Svein Oddvar Moen |

| 11 May 2016 10 | Haugesund | 3–1 | Odd | Haugesund |
| 19:00 CEST (UTC+2) | Agdestein 9'; Hajradinović 27', 31' | Summary | Semb Berge 21'; Eriksen (yellow card) 65'; Jensen (yellow card) 69' | Stadium: Haugesund Stadion; Attendance: 4,081; Referee: Kai Erik Steen |

| 16 May 2016 11 | Odd | 2–0 | Molde | Skien |
| 18:00 CEST (UTC+2) | Occéan 60'; Zekhnini 71' | Summary | Elyounoussi (yellow card) 70' | Stadium: Skagerak Arena; Attendance: 10,678; Referee: Ola Hobber Nilsen |

| 20 May 2016 12 | Sarpsborg 08 | 0–0 | Odd | Sarpsborg |
| 19:00 CEST (UTC+2) | | Summary | Eriksen (yellow card) 55' | Stadium: Sarpsborg Stadion; Attendance: 3,450; Referee: Svein-Erik Edvartsen |

| 29 May 2016 13 | Odd | 2–1 | Strømsgodset | Skien |
| 15:30 CEST (UTC+2) | Nordkvelle 3' (pen.); Jensen (yellow card) 21'; Akabueze 73'; Zekhnini (yellow card) 88' | Summary | Nguen 35'; Abu (yellow card) 66'; Francisco Júnior (red card) 83'; Pedersen (yellow card) 87'; Høiland (yellow card) 87' | Stadium: Skagerak Arena; Attendance: 8,656; Referee: Dag Vidar Hafsås |

| 3 July 2016 14 | Vålerenga | 0–1 | Odd | Oslo |
| 15:30 CEST (UTC+2) | | Summary | Zekhnini 41' | Stadium: Ullevaal Stadion; Attendance: 7,667; Referee: Tore Hansen |

| 10 July 2016 15 | Odd | 4–1 | Aalesund | Skien |
| 18:00 CEST (UTC+2) | Occéan 15', 59'; Bentley 38'; Zekhnini 67' | Summary | Riise (yellow card) 30'; Boli (yellow card) 45+2'; Gyasi 47' | Stadium: Skagerak Arena; Attendance: 7,067; Referee: Espen Eskås |

| 17 July 2016 16 | Bodø/Glimt | 2–1 | Odd | Bodø |
| 18:00 CEST (UTC+2) | Normann (yellow card) 26'; Olsen 36' (yellow card) 56'; Azemi 65' | Summary | Ruud 28'; Gashi (yellow card) 88' | Stadium: Aspmyra Stadion; Attendance: 2,935; Referee: Tom Harald Hagen |

| 24 July 2016 17 | Odd | 2–2 | Viking | Skien |
| 18:00 CEST (UTC+2) | Ibrahim 40'; Haukås (yellow card) 78' | Summary | Berge 53'; Occéan 78' (yellow card) 90+3' | Stadium: Skagerak Arena; Attendance: 6,991; Referee: Trygve Kjensli |

| 31 July 2016 18 | Odd | 1–3 | Brann | Skien |
| 18:00 CEST (UTC+2) | Samuelsen (yellow card) 73'; Occéan 80' (yellow card) 81' | Summary | Demidov (yellow card) 2' (goal) 44'; Nilsen (yellow card) 59'; S.Skålevik (yellow card) 69'; Haugen 88', 90' | Stadium: Skagerak Arena; Attendance: 8,025; Referee: Ola Hobber Nilsen |

| 7 August 2016 19 | Start | 1–2 | Odd | Kristiansand |
| 18:00 CEST (UTC+2) | Johnson 12' (pen.); Aase (yellow card) 39' | Summary | Akabueze 53'; O.Berg (yellow card) 77'; Occéan 81' | Stadium: Sør Arena; Attendance: 3,810; Referee: Trond Iver Døvle |

| 14 August 2016 20 | Odd | 0–0 | Sarpsborg 08 | Skien |
| 18:00 CEST (UTC+2) | Berge (yellow card) 50' (red card) 66'; Samuelsen (yellow card) 90+1' | Summary | Thomassen (yellow card) 33'; Lindberg (yellow card) 69' | Stadium: Skagerak Arena; Attendance: 7,008; Referee: Martin Lundby |

| 21 August 2016 21 | Molde | 4–2 | Odd | Molde |
| 18:00 CEST (UTC+2) | Sigurðarson 13', 64'; Flo (yellow card) 72'; T.Svendsen 90+1'; Singh 90+7' | Summary | Ruud (yellow card) 38'; Hagen 72'; Bentley 82'; Zekhnini (yellow card) 90' | Stadium: Aker Stadion; Attendance: 8,075; Referee: Kim Andre Johnsen |

| 28 August 2016 22 | Odd | 1–2 | Vålerenga | Skien |
| 20:00 CEST (UTC+2) | Ruud 46'; Occéan (yellow card) 85' | Summary | Lekven (yellow card) 10'; Abdellaoue (yellow card) 35' (goal) 45+1', 64' | Stadium: Skagerak Arena; Attendance: 9,135; Referee: Svein-Erik Edvartsen |

| 11 September 2016 23 | Lillestrøm | 2–4 | Odd | Lillestrøm |
| 18:00 CEST (UTC+2) | Martin 35' (yellow card) 45+2'; Mikalsen 84'; Kippe (yellow card) 90+2' | Summary | Samuelsen (yellow card) 25'; Ruud 45', 65', 90+3'; Haugen 90+5' | Stadium: Åråsen Stadion; Attendance: 5,613; Referee: Ola Hobber Nilsen |

| 18 September 2016 24 | Odd | 0–1 | Stabæk | Skien |
| 18:00 CEST (UTC+2) | | Soccerway | Keita 58'; Escoe (yellow card) 80' | Stadium: Skagerak Arena; Attendance: 8,530; Referee: Tom Harald Hagen |

| 25 September 2016 25 | Strømsgodset | 1–1 | Odd | Drammen |
| 18:00 CEST (UTC+2) | Adjei-Boateng 5' | Summary | Bentley 1' | Stadium: Marienlyst Stadion; Attendance: 6,703; Referee: Tommy Skjerven |

| 2 October 2016 26 | Aalesund | 1–0 | Odd | Ålesund |
| 18:00 CEST (UTC+2) | Gyasi 85' (yellow card) 86' | Report | Jensen (yellow card) 83' | Stadium: Color Line Stadion; Attendance: 5,832; Referee: Kai Erik Steen |

| 16 October 2016 27 | Odd | 2–1 | Haugesund | Skien |
| 18:00 CEST (UTC+2) | Occéan 31'; Nordkvelle 34' (pen.) | Summary | Skjerve 77'; Hajradinović (yellow card) 89' | Stadium: Skagerak Arena; Attendance: 7,512; Referee: Dag Vidar Hafsås |

| 23 October 2016 28 | Rosenborg | 1–2 | Odd | Trondheim |
| 18:00 CEST (UTC+2) | Mushaga Bakenga 42' | Summary | Nordkvelle 32'; Jensen (yellow card) 49'; Bentley (yellow card) 87'; Semb Berge 90' | Stadium: Lerkendal Stadion; Attendance: 18,415; Referee: Martin Lundby |

| 30 October 2016 29 | Odd | 3–1 | Sogndal | Skien |
| 18:00 CET (UTC+1) | Nordkvelle 67'; Mladenovic 77'; Zekhnini 85' | Summary | Raitala 5' | Stadium: Skagerak Arena; Attendance: 9,851; Referee: Ola Hobber Nilsen |

| 6 November 2016 30 | Tromsø | 3–1 | Odd | Tromsø |
| 18:00 CET (UTC+1) | Sigurðarson 12' (pen.); Moussa 14'; Gamst Pedersen (yellow card) 64'; Espejord 78' | Summary | Ruud (yellow card) 12'; Occean 65' | Stadium: Alfheim Stadion; Referee: Svein Oddvar Moen |

==== Table ====
| Pos | Team | Pld | W | D | L | GF | GA | GD | Pts | Qualification or relegation |
|---|---|---|---|---|---|---|---|---|---|---|
| 1 | Rosenborg (C) | 30 | 21 | 6 | 3 | 65 | 25 | +40 | 69 | Qualification for the Champions League second qualifying round (Note: Rosenborg qualified for the Europa League second qualifying round by winning the 2016 Norwegian Cup. However, since they already qualified for European competition based on their league position, the spot awarded to the cup winners was passed down the league.) |
| 2 | Brann | 30 | 16 | 6 | 8 | 42 | 27 | +15 | 54 | Qualification for the Europa League second qualifying round |
| 3 | Odd | 30 | 15 | 6 | 9 | 44 | 35 | +9 | 51 | Qualification for the Europa League first qualifying round |
| 4 | Haugesund | 30 | 12 | 10 | 8 | 47 | 43 | +4 | 46 | Qualification for the Europa League first qualifying round |
| 5 | Molde | 30 | 13 | 6 | 11 | 48 | 42 | +6 | 45 | |

Source: Football Association of Norway (in Norwegian), Soccerway
Rules for classification: 1) Points; 2) Goal difference; 3) Goals scored; 4) Head-to-head points; 5) Head-to-head goal difference; 6) Head-to-head away goals scored (between two teams).
(C) Champions

=== Norwegian Cup ===
| 13 April 2016 First Round | Tollnes | 0–5 | Odd | Skien |
| 18:00 CEST (UTC+2) | J.Andersen (yellow card) 55'; K.Gudmundsen (yellow card) 64' | Summary | Bergan 6'; Nilsen 51'; Bentley 79'; Johansen 80', 84' | Stadium: Tollnes stadion Attendance: 1,216; Referee: Tim-Nicolai Fjellvang |

| 27 April 2016 Second Round | Tønsberg | 0–6 | Odd | Tønsberg |
| 18:00 CEST (UTC+2) | | Summary | Johansen 36'; Jensen 42'; Halvorsen 43', 55'; Berg 48', 61' | Stadium: Tønsberg Gressbane; Attendance: 933; Referee: Marius Lien |

| 4 May 2016 Third Round | Asker | 2–3 | Odd | Asker |
| 18:00 CEST (UTC+2) | A. Heimisson (yellow card) 6'; A. Harstad 10'; Traoré 86'; E. Bydal (yellow card) 90' | Summary | Johansen 23', 54'; Halvorsen 78' | Stadium: Føyka Stadion; Attendance: 1,062; Referee: Christian Moen |

| 25 May 2016 Fourth Round | Tromsø | 3–2 (a.e.t.) | Odd | Tromsø |
| 18:00 CEST (UTC+2) | Moussa 13'; Espejord 78'; Antonsen (yellow card) 80'; Wangberg (yellow card) 90'; Olsen 102' | Summary | Akabueze 24' 44'; Grøgaard (yellow card) 84'; Semb Berge (yellow card) 90' | Stadium: Alfheim Stadion; Attendance: 1,433; Referee: Trygve Kjensli |

=== Europa League ===
==== Qualifying phase ====
| 30 June 2016 First qualifying round 1st leg | Odd (Norway) | 2–0 | (Finland) Mariehamn | Skien, Norway |
| 19:00 CEST (UTC+2) | Grøgaard 63'; Occéan 86' | Report | | Stadium: Skagerak Arena; Attendance: 3,701; Referee: Mohammed Al-Hakim (Sweden) |

| 7 July 2016 First qualifying round 2nd leg | Mariehamn (Finland) | 1–1 (1–3 agg.) | (Norway) Odd | Mariehamn, Finland |
| 18:00 CEST (UTC+2) | Mantilla 4'; Kangaskolkka (yellow card) 31'; Kojola (yellow card) 42'; Span (yellow card) 56' | Report | Jensen (yellow card) 40'; Berge (yellow card) 72'; Halvorsen (yellow card) 74'; Bentley 78' | Stadium: Wiklöf Holding Arena; Attendance: 1,402; Referee: Peter Kjærsgaard-Andersen (Denmark) |

| 14 July 2016 Second qualifying round 1st leg | PAS Giannina (Greece) | 3–0 | (Norway) Odd | Ioannina, Greece |
| 20:00 CEST (UTC+2) | Michail 7'; Berios (yellow card) 16'; Fonsi 31'; Karanikas (yellow card) 66'; Acosta 68' | Report | Eriksen (yellow card) 37' | Stadium: Zosimades Stadium; Attendance: 5,615; Referee: Glenn Nyberg (Sweden) |

| 21 July 2016 Second qualifying round 2nd leg | Odd (Norway) | 3–1 (a.e.t.) (3–4 agg.) | (Greece) PAS Giannina | Skien, Norway |
| 19:00 CEST (UTC+2) | Nordkvelle 55' (pen.); Bentley 57'; Ruud 89'; Berge (yellow card) 97' | Report | Koutris 98'; A.Paschalakis (yellow card) 117' | Stadium: Skagerak Arena; Referee: Tomasz Musiał (Poland) |

== Squad statistics ==
As of match played 6 November 2016

=== Appearances and goals ===
| No. | Pos | Nat | Player | Total | | Tippeligaen | | Norwegian Cup | | UEFA Europa League | |
| No. | Pos | Nat | Player | Apps | Goals | Apps | Goals | Apps | Goals | Apps | Goals |
|---|---|---|---|---|---|---|---|---|---|---|---|
| 1 | GK | (Norway) NOR | Sondre Rossbach | 36 | 0 | 30 | 0 | 2 | 0 | 4 | 0 |
| 2 | DF | (Norway) NOR | Espen Ruud | 35 | 6 | 29 | 5 | 2 | 0 | 4 | 1 |
| 3 | MF | (Kosovo) KOS | Ardian Gashi | 3 | 0 | 0+2 | 0 | 0+1 | 0 | 0 | 0 |
| 4 | DF | (Norway) NOR | Vegard Bergan | 9 | 1 | 2+3 | 0 | 1+1 | 1 | 0+2 | 0 |
| 5 | DF | (Norway) NOR | Thomas Grøgaard | 32 | 1 | 23+3 | 0 | 2+1 | 0 | 3 | 1 |
| 6 | MF | (Norway) NOR | Oliver Berg | 29 | 3 | 19+4 | 0 | 2 | 3 | 3+1 | 0 |
| 7 | MF | (Norway) NOR | Ole Jørgen Halvorsen | 21 | 3 | 5+11 | 0 | 2 | 3 | 3 | 0 |
| 8 | MF | (Norway) NOR | Jone Samuelsen | 16 | 2 | 13+2 | 1 | 0 | 1 | 1 | 0 |
| 10 | FW | (Canada) CAN | Olivier Occéan | 30 | 11 | 27+1 | 10 | 0 | 0 | 0+2 | 1 |
| 11 | FW | (Norway) NOR | Rafik Zekhnini | 27 | 5 | 20+2 | 5 | 2 | 0 | 2+1 | 0 |
| 12 | GK | (Norway) NOR | Viljar Myhra | 1 | 0 | 0 | 0 | 1 | 0 | 0 | 0 |
| 13 | MF | (Norway) NOR | Stefan Mladenovic | 11 | 1 | 0+11 | 1 | 0 | 0 | 0 | 0 |
| 14 | MF | (Norway) NOR | Fredrik Nordkvelle | 33 | 8 | 26+3 | 7 | 0+1 | 0 | 3 | 1 |
| 15 | MF | (Norway) NOR | Sigurd Hauso Haugen | 4 | 1 | 0+3 | 1 | 0 | 0 | 0+1 | 0 |
| 16 | DF | (Norway) NOR | Fredrik Semb Berge | 26 | 5 | 24 | 5 | 0 | 0 | 2 | 0 |
| 17 | MF | (Norway) NOR | Eric Kitolano | 2 | 0 | 0 | 0 | 0+2 | 0 | 0 | 0 |
| 18 | DF | (Norway) NOR | Joakim Våge Nilsen | 29 | 2 | 9+13 | 1 | 3 | 1 | 3+1 | 0 |
| 19 | MF | (Canada) CAN | Zakaria Messoudi | 4 | 0 | 0+2 | 0 | 0+1 | 0 | 0+1 | 0 |
| 20 | MF | (Norway) NOR | Fredrik Oldrup Jensen | 34 | 1 | 28 | 0 | 2 | 1 | 2+2 | 0 |
| 21 | DF | (Norway) NOR | Steffen Hagen | 36 | 1 | 30 | 1 | 2 | 0 | 4 | 0 |
| 22 | MF | (Norway) NOR | Erik Eikeng | 1 | 0 | 0 | 0 | 1 | 0 | 0 | 0 |
| 23 | DF | (Norway) NOR | Lars Kristian Eriksen | 15 | 0 | 6+3 | 0 | 3 | 0 | 3 | 0 |
| 24 | FW | (Finland) FIN | Riku Riski | 14 | 0 | 12+2 | 0 | 0 | 0 | 0 | 0 |
| 25 | DF | (Norway) NOR | John Kitolano | 1 | 0 | 0 | 0 | 1 | 0 | 0 | 0 |
| 26 | FW | (Nigeria) NGR | Bentley | 37 | 10 | 26+4 | 7 | 2+1 | 1 | 3+1 | 2 |
Players away from Odd on loan:
Players who appeared for Odd no longer at the club:
| 9 | FW | (Norway) NOR | Henrik Kjelsrud Johansen | 17 | 5 | 1+9 | 0 | 3 | 5 | 4 | 0 |

=== Goal scorers ===
| Place | Position | Nation | Number | Name | Tippeligaen | Norwegian Cup | UEFA Europa League | Total |
|---|---|---|---|---|---|---|---|---|
| 1 | FW | (Canada) | 10 | Olivier Occéan | 10 | 0 | 1 | 11 |
| 2 | FW | (Nigeria) | 26 | Bentley | 7 | 1 | 2 | 10 |
| 3 | MF | (Norway) | 14 | Fredrik Nordkvelle | 7 | 0 | 1 | 8 |
| 4 | DF | (Norway) | 2 | Espen Ruud | 5 | 0 | 1 | 6 |
| 5 | DF | (Norway) | 16 | Fredrik Semb Berge | 5 | 0 | 0 | 5 |
| 5 | FW | (Norway) | 11 | Rafik Zekhnini | 5 | 0 | 0 | 5 |
| 5 | FW | (Norway) | 9 | Henrik Kjelsrud Johansen | 0 | 5 | 0 | 5 |
| 8 | MF | (Norway) | 7 | Ole Jørgen Halvorsen | 0 | 3 | 0 | 3 |
| 9 | DF | (Norway) | 18 | Joakim Våge Nilsen | 1 | 1 | 0 | 2 |
| 9 | MF | (Norway) | 6 | Oliver Berg | 0 | 2 | 0 | 2 |
| 11 | MF | (Norway) | 8 | Jone Samuelsen | 1 | 0 | 0 | 1 |
| 11 | DF | (Norway) | 21 | Steffen Hagen | 1 | 0 | 0 | 1 |
| 11 | MF | (Norway) | 15 | Sigurd Hauso Haugen | 1 | 0 | 0 | 1 |
| 11 | MF | (Norway) | 13 | Stefan Mladenovic | 1 | 0 | 0 | 1 |
| 11 | DF | (Norway) | 4 | Vegard Bergan | 0 | 1 | 0 | 1 |
| 11 | MF | (Norway) | 20 | Fredrik Oldrup Jensen | 0 | 1 | 0 | 1 |
| 11 | DF | (Norway) | 5 | Thomas Grøgaard | 0 | 0 | 1 | 1 |
| | | | | TOTALS | 40 | 13 | 6 | 59 |

=== Disciplinary record ===
| Number | Nation | Position | Name | Tippeligaen | | Norwegian Cup | | UEFA Europa League | | Total | |
| Number | Nation | Position | Name | Yellow card | Red card | Yellow card | Red card | Yellow card | Red card | Yellow card | Red card |
| 2 | (Norway) | DF | Espen Ruud | 5 | 0 | 0 | 0 | 0 | 0 | 5 | 0 |
| 3 | (Kosovo) | MF | Ardian Gashi | 1 | 0 | 0 | 0 | 0 | 0 | 1 | 0 |
| 6 | (Norway) | MF | Oliver Berg | 2 | 0 | 0 | 0 | 0 | 0 | 2 | 0 |
| 7 | (Norway) | MF | Ole Jørgen Halvorsen | 0 | 0 | 0 | 0 | 1 | 0 | 1 | 0 |
| 8 | (Norway) | MF | Jone Samuelsen | 5 | 0 | 0 | 0 | 0 | 0 | 5 | 0 |
| 10 | (Canada) | FW | Olivier Occéan | 3 | 0 | 0 | 0 | 0 | 0 | 3 | 0 |
| 11 | (Norway) | FW | Rafik Zekhnini | 2 | 0 | 0 | 0 | 0 | 0 | 2 | 0 |
| 16 | (Norway) | DF | Fredrik Semb Berge | 3 | 1 | 0 | 0 | 2 | 0 | 5 | 1 |
| 20 | (Norway) | MF | Fredrik Oldrup Jensen | 6 | 0 | 0 | 0 | 1 | 0 | 7 | 0 |
| 23 | (Norway) | DF | Lars Kristian Eriksen | 3 | 0 | 0 | 0 | 1 | 0 | 4 | 0 |
| 26 | (Nigeria) | MF | Bentley | 2 | 0 | 0 | 0 | 0 | 0 | 2 | 0 |
| | | | TOTALS | 33 | 1 | 0 | 0 | 6 | 0 | 39 | 1 |
