= 2018 Odds BK season =

Odd
2018 season
- Chairman: Trond Haukvik
- Manager: Dag-Eilev Fagermo (until 31 December)
- Stadium: Skagerak Arena
- Eliteserien: 9th
- Norwegian Cup: Fourth Round vs Rosenborg
- Top goalscorer: League: Two Players (4); All: Tobias Lauritsen (8)
Home colours	Away colours	Third colours

Odds Ballklubb, commonly known as Odd, is a Norwegian football club from Skien. Originally the football section of a multi-sports club, founded in 1894 nine years after the club's founding. All other sports than football were discontinued and the club became dedicated to football only. Odd plays in the Norwegian top division, Tippeligaen, and holds the record winning the Norwegian Football Cup the most times, the last coming in 2000. The club was known as Odd Grenland between 1994 and 2012. During the 2018 season the club will be participating in the Eliteserien and NM Cupen.

== Squad ==
Note: Flags indicate national team as defined under FIFA eligibility rules; some limited exceptions apply. Players may hold more than one non-FIFA nationality.

No.	Pos.	Nation	Player
1	GK	NOR	Sondre Rossbach
2	DF	NOR	Espen Ruud
3	DF	NOR	Fredrik Semb Berge
4	DF	NOR	Vegard Bergan
6	MF	NOR	Vebjørn Hoff
7	MF	SWE	Martin Broberg
8	MF	NOR	Jone Samuelsen
9	FW	NOR	Birk Risa
11	FW	KOS	Elbasan Rashani
12	GK	NOR	Viljar Myhra
13	MF	NOR	Stefan Mladenovic
14	MF	NOR	Fredrik Nordkvelle

No.	Pos.	Nation	Player
15	DF	NOR	Andreas Nordvik
16	MF	NOR	Joshua Kitolano
17	MF	NOR	Markus Andreas Kaasa
18	DF	NOR	Odin Bjørtuft
19	MF	NOR	Bilal Njie
20	MF	NOR	Tobias Lauritsen
21	DF	NOR	Steffen Hagen (Captain)
22	MF	NOR	Torgeir Børven
23	FW	NOR	Marius Bustgaard Larsen
24	MF	NOR	André Sødlund
--	GK	NOR	Ajay Sureshkumar

== Transfers ==
=== Winter ===
In: Note: Flags indicate national team as defined under FIFA eligibility rules; some limited exceptions apply. Players may hold more than one non-FIFA nationality.

No.	Pos.	Nation	Player
6	MF	NOR	Vebjørn Hoff (from (Norway) Aalesund)
9	FW	NOR	Birk Risa (from (Germany) Köln)
19	MF	NOR	Bilal Njie (from (Norway) Vålerenga)
20	FW	NOR	Tobias Lauritsen (from (Norway) Pors)
22	FW	NOR	Torgeir Børven (from (Norway) Brann)

Out: Note: Flags indicate national team as defined under FIFA eligibility rules; some limited exceptions apply. Players may hold more than one non-FIFA nationality.

No.	Pos.	Nation	Player
6	MF	NOR	Oliver Berg (to (Sweden) Dalkurd)}
9	FW	NOR	Torbjørn Agdestein (to (Norway) Aalesund)
10	FW	CAN	Olivier Occéan (to (Norway) Urædd)
15	FW	NOR	Sigurd Hauso Haugen (to (Norway) Sogndal)
18	DF	NOR	Joakim Våge Nilsen (to (Norway) Haugesund)
19	MF	CAN	Zakaria Messoudi (released)
20	MF	NOR	Etzaz Hussain (loan return to (Norway) Molde)
22	MF	NOR	Erik Eikeng (released)
24	FW	FIN	Riku Riski (to (Finland) HJK Helsinki)
27	FW	SEN	Pape Paté Diouf (to (Norway) Arendal)

=== Summer ===
In: Note: Flags indicate national team as defined under FIFA eligibility rules; some limited exceptions apply. Players may hold more than one non-FIFA nationality.

No.	Pos.	Nation	Player
15	DF	NOR	Andreas Nordvik (from (Denmark) Fredericia)
24	MF	NOR	André Sødlund (from (Norway) Sandefjord)

Out: Note: Flags indicate national team as defined under FIFA eligibility rules; some limited exceptions apply. Players may hold more than one non-FIFA nationality.

No.	Pos.	Nation	Player
5	DF	NOR	Thomas Grøgaard (to (Norway) Brann)
24	DF	NOR	John Kitolano (to (England) Wolverhampton Wanderers)

== Competitions ==
=== Eliteserien ===
==== Results summary ====
Overall								Home						Away					
Pld	W	D	L	GF	GA	GD	Pts	W	D	L	GF	GA	GD	W	D	L	GF	GA	GD
30	11	7	12	39	38	+1	40	8	3	4	27	16	+11	3	4	8	12	22	−10

Last updated: 24 November 2018.
Source: see below

==== Results by round ====
Round	1	2	3	4	5	6	7	8	9	10	11	12	13	14	15	16	17	18	19	20	21	22	23	24	25	26	27	28	29	30
Ground	A	H	H	H	A	H	A	H	A	H	A	H	A	H	A	H	A	H	A	A	H	A	H	A	H	A	H	A	H	A
Result	L	L	D	W	L	W	W	W	L	W	L	L	D	L	L	W	D	D	D	W	D	W	W	D	W	L	W	L	L	L
Position	11	14	13	9	13	10	8	8	8	8	9	9	10	10	10	10	10	10	10	10	10	8	6	7	6	6	6	7	7	9

Updated to match(es) played on 24 November 2018. Source: see below
A = Away; H = Home; W = Win; D = Draw; L = Loss

==== Results ====
11 March 2018 1	Odd	1–2	Haugesund	Skien
18:00 CET (UTC+1)	Broberg 75'	Report	Berge 52'; Gytkjær 62'	Stadium: Skagerak Arena; Attendance: 4,466; Referee: Tom Harald Hagen

18 March 2018 2	Vålerenga	2–1	Odd	Oslo
20:00 CET (UTC+1)	Tollås (yellow card) 37' (goal) 60'; Juklerød (penalty missed) 50'; Friðjónsson (yellow card) 64'; Johnson 65'	Report	Njie 58'	Stadium: Intility Arena; Attendance: 6,063; Referee: Svein Oddvar Moen

2 April 2018 3	Odd	1–1	Rosenborg	Skien
20:00 CEST (UTC+2)	Rasmussen 57' (o.g.)	Report	Helland 55'	Stadium: Skagerak Arena; Attendance: 5,497; Referee: Ola Hobber Nilsen

8 April 2018 4	Odd	1–0	Bodø/Glimt	Skien
18:00 CEST (UTC+2)	Ruud 67'; Samuelsen (yellow card) 86'	Report	José Ángel (yellow card) 65'	Stadium: Skagerak Arena; Attendance: 4,859; Referee: Rohit Saggi

15 April 2018 5	Strømsgodset	3–0	Odd	Drammen
18:00 CEST (UTC+2)	Glesnes (yellow card) 48'; Pedersen 61', 71', 76'; Júnior (yellow card) 84'	Report	Hoff (yellow card) 27'; Samuelsen (yellow card) 43'; Risa (yellow card) 83'	Stadium: Marienlyst Stadion; Attendance: 5,588; Referee: Kristoffer Hagenes

23 April 2018 6	Odd	3–1	Sarpsborg 08	Skien
19:00 CEST (UTC+2)	Rashani 14', 53' (yellow card) 75'; Broberg 62'	Report	Zachariassen (yellow card) 24'; Ruud (yellow card) 37'	Stadium: Skagerak Arena; Attendance: 4,861; Referee: Espen Eskås

29 April 2018 7	Molde	0–1	Odd	Molde
18:00 CEST (UTC+2)	Gregersen (yellow card) 44'	Report	Nordkvelle 36'	Stadium: Aker Stadion; Attendance: 6,793; Referee: Tommy Skjerven

6 May 2018 8	Odd	3–0	Start	Skien
18:00 CEST (UTC+2)	Nordkvelle 19'; Rashani 44'; Lauritsen 76'	Report	Salvesen (red card) 40'	Stadium: Skagerak Arena; Attendance: 6,530; Referee: Sigurd Smehus Kringstad

13 May 2018 9	Ranheim	3–1	Odd	Trondheim
18:00 CEST (UTC+2)	Reginiussen 41', 75'; Storflor 44'; Løkberg (yellow card) 84'	Report	Broberg 20'	Stadium: EXTRA Arena; Attendance: 2,013; Referee: Ola Hobber Nilsen

16 May 2018 10	Odd	5–0	Sandefjord	Skien
18:00 CEST (UTC+2)	Broberg 25'; Kaasa 31'; Rashani 33'; Risa 73'; Børven 82'	Report	Pálsson (yellow card) 39'	Stadium: Skagerak Arena; Attendance: 6,122; Referee: Tommy Skjerven

21 May 2018 11	Stabæk	2–1	Odd	Bærum
18:00 CEST (UTC+2)	Børkeeiet (yellow card) 31'; Omoijuanfo 70'; Brochmann 85' (pen.); Moe (yellow card) 90+4'	Report	Broberg (yellow card) 36'; Børven 53'; Rashani (yellow card) 75'; Bergan (yellow card) 84'; Njie (yellow card) 90+3'	Stadium: Nadderud Stadion; Attendance: 3,380; Referee: Dag Vidar Hafsås

27 May 2018 12	Odd	1–2	Kristiansund	Skien
18:00 CEST (UTC+2)	Njie 88'	Report	Diop (yellow card) 70'; Bye 74'; Bamba 81' (yellow card) 89'	Stadium: Skagerak Arena; Attendance: 5,196; Referee: Espen Eskås

10 June 2018 13	Lillestrøm	0–0	Odd	Lillestrøm
18:00 CEST (UTC+2)	Rafn (yellow card) 77'	Report	Ruud (yellow card) 90+3'	Stadium: Åråsen Stadion; Attendance: 5,060; Referee: Rohit Saggi

25 June 2016 14	Odd	0–1	Brann	Skien
19:00 CEST (UTC+2)	Samuelsen (yellow card) 54'; Kaasa (yellow card) 59'; Broberg (yellow card) 79'	Report	Larsen (yellow card) 43'; Acosta 63'	Stadium: Skagerak Arena; Attendance: 6,761; Referee: Ola Hobber Nilsen

1 July 2018 15	Tromsø	2–1	Odd	Tromsø
18:00 CEST (UTC+2)	Espejord 7'; Wangberg 53'; Antonsen (yellow card) 90'	Report	Rashani 14' (yellow card) 62'	Stadium: Alfheim Stadion; Attendance: 3,387; Referee: Sigurd Smehus Kringstad

8 July 2018 16	Odd	3–1	Lillestrøm	Skien
18:00 CEST (UTC+2)	Rashani 13'; Bergan 55'; Mladenovic 65'	Report	Olsen 78'	Stadium: Skagerak Arena; Attendance: 5,421; Referee: Svein Oddvar Moen

5 August 2018 17	Kristiansund	1–1	Odd	Kristiansund
18:00 CEST (UTC+2)	Diop (yellow card) 31'; Aasmundsen (yellow card) 46'; Aasbak 53'	Report	Njie 19'; Ruud (yellow card) 59'	Stadium: Kristiansund Stadion; Attendance: 4,003; Referee: Trond Ivar Døvle

12 August 2018 18	Odd	2–2	Strømsgodset	Skien
20:00 CEST (UTC+2)	Ruud 12'; Børven 30'; Rashani (yellow card) 52'; Risa (yellow card) 69'	Report	Andersen (yellow card) 17'; Tokstad 50'; Vilsvik (yellow card) 52'; Hauger (yellow card) 60'; Pedersen 81'	Stadium: Skagerak Arena; Attendance: 5,163; Referee: Trygve Kjensli

20 August 2018 19	Bodø/Glimt	1–1	Odd	Bodø
19:00 CEST (UTC+2)	Saltnes (yellow card) 18'; Opseth 22'; Bjørnbak (yellow card) 88'	Report	Samuelsen (yellow card) 20'; Ruud 26'	Stadium: Aspmyra Stadion; Attendance: 2,881; Referee: Kai Erik Steen

27 August 2018 20	Start	0–1	Odd	Kristiansand
19:00 CEST (UTC+2)	Hadzic (yellow card) 77'	Report	Rashani 3'; Rossbach (yellow card) 58'	Stadium: Sør Arena; Attendance: 3,494; Referee: Dag Vidar Hafsås

2 September 2018 21	Odd	1–1	Molde	Skien
18:00 CEST (UTC+2)	Ruud 68'	Report	Broberg 17' (o.g.); Ssewankambo (yellow card) 64'	Stadium: Skagerak Arena; Attendance: 5,289; Referee: Svein Oddvar Moen

16 September 2018 22	Sarpsborg 08	1–2	Odd	Sarpsborg
18:00 CEST (UTC+2)	Horn (yellow card) 10'; Thomassen 48'; Tamm (yellow card) 90+1'	Report	Ruud 14', 52'; Samuelsen (yellow card) 35'	Stadium: Sarpsborg Stadion; Attendance: 4,886; Referee: Sigurd Smehus Kringstad

22 September 2018 23	Odd	3–2	Vålerenga	Skien
18:00 CEST (UTC+2)	Ruud 39'; Børven 66', 79'	Report	Johnson (yellow card) 29'; Ejuke 48'; Abu (yellow card) 49'; Finne 68'	Stadium: Skagerak Arena; Attendance: 6,053; Referee: Kristoffer Hagenes

29 September 2018 24	Sandefjord	1–1	Odd	Sandefjord
18:00 CEST (UTC+2)	Rufo 39' (yellow card) 84'	Report	Vales 52' (o.g.)	Stadium: Komplett Arena; Attendance: 2,601; Referee: Tommy Skjerven

7 October 2018 25	Odd	2–0	Ranheim	Skien
18:00 CEST (UTC+2)	Hoff (yellow card) 31'; Ruud (yellow card) 52'; Hagen 76'; Furu 78' (o.g.)	Report	Reginiussen (yellow card) 37'; Furu (yellow card) 59'	Stadium: Skagerak Arena; Attendance: 4,762; Referee: Sigurd Smehus Kringstad

21 October 2018 26	Haugesund	2–0	Odd	Haugesund
18:00 CEST (UTC+2)	Tronstad (yellow card) 26'; David 32' (pen.); Wadji 59'	Report	Rossbach (yellow card) 45+1'; Ruud (yellow card) 51'	Stadium: Haugesund Stadion; Attendance: 3,931; Referee: Kristoffer Hagenes

28 October 2018 27	Odd	1–0	Tromsø	Skien
18:00 CET (UTC+1)	Hoff (yellow card) 53'; Pedersen 56' (o.g.); Broberg (yellow card) 70'	Report	Valakari (yellow card) 70'	Stadium: Skagerak Arena; Attendance: 4,943; Referee: Rohit Saggi

4 November 2018 28	Rosenborg	3–1	Odd	Trondheim
18:00 CEST (UTC+1)	Meling (yellow card) 37'; Helland 40', 61'; Jensen 56'; Denić (yellow card) 76'	Report	Risa (yellow card) 23'; Ruud 60'	Stadium: Lerkendal Stadion; Attendance: 13,983; Referee: Tom Harald Hagen

11 November 2018 29	Odd	0–3	Stabæk	Skien
18:00 CET (UTC+1)	Rossbach (yellow card) 73'; Rashani (yellow card) 84'	Report	Brynhildsen 11'; Boli 72'; Omoijuanfo 78'	Stadium: Skagerak Arena; Attendance: 4,823; Referee: Kai Erik Steen

24 November 2018 30	Brann	1–0	Odd	Bergen
18:00 CEST (UTC+2)	Bamba 3'	Report	Ruud (yellow card) 90+1'	Stadium: Brann Stadion; Attendance: 11,677; Referee: Trond Ivar Døvle

==== Table ====
Pos	Team	Pld	W	D	L	GF	GA	GD	Pts
7	Ranheim	30	12	6	12	43	50	−7	42
8	Sarpsborg 08	30	11	8	11	46	39	+7	41
9	Odd	30	11	7	12	39	38	+1	40
10	Tromsø	30	11	3	16	41	48	−7	36
11	Bodø/Glimt	30	6	14	10	32	35	−3	32

Source: Football Association of Norway (in Norwegian), Soccerway
Rules for classification: 1) Points; 2) Goal difference; 3) Goals scored; 4) Head-to-head points; 5) Head-to-head goal difference; 6) Head-to-head away goals scored (only if between two teams); 7) Head-to-head goals scored; 8) Play-off (only used to decide champions or relegation).

=== Norwegian Cup ===
18 April 2018 First Round	Skarphedin	0–9	Odd	Bø
18:00 CEST (UTC+2)	I.Bleivik (yellow card) 84'	Report	Broberg 8'; Lauritsen 30', 38' (pen.), 66', 76'; Rashani 73', 90+2'; Jos.Kitolano 78'; Mladenovic 83'	Stadium: Gullbringbanen; Attendance: 1,350; Referee: Herman Leiulfsrud Aass

2 May 2018 Second Round	Fredrikstad	0–3	Odd	Fredrikstad
18:00 CEST (UTC+2)	M.Nielsen (yellow card) 41'; Y.Chaib 70'	Report	Lauritsen 10', 26'; Mladenovic 73'	Stadium: Fredrikstad Stadion; Attendance: 1,981; Referee: Bjørn Hansen

9 May 2018 Third Round	Notodden	1–1 (a.e.t.) (1–3 p)	Odd	Notodden
18:00 CEST (UTC+2)	Ferreira 2'; J.Perez (yellow card) 37'; E.Hustad (yellow card) 120+2'	Report	Mladenovic 41'; Rashani (yellow card) 102'	Stadium: Notodden Stadion; Attendance: 1,158; Referee: Mohammad Usman Aslam
	Penalties
	Midtgarden (penalty missed); Asp (penalty scored); Hoven (penalty missed); Akinb.Akinyemi (penalty missed)		(penalty scored) Børven; (penalty scored) Ruud; (penalty scored) Nordkvelle

30 May 2018 Fourth Round	Rosenborg	2–2 (a.e.t.) (7–6 p)	Odd	Trondheim
18:30 CEST (UTC+2)	Konradsen 25' (yellow card) 84'; Søderlund 81'; Meling (yellow card) 87'	Report	Risa 3'; Lauritsen 79'	Stadium: Lerkendal Stadion; Attendance: 6,059; Referee: Kai Erik Steen
	Penalties
	Levi (penalty scored); Søderlund (penalty scored); Hedenstad (penalty scored); Hovland (penalty scored); Meling (penalty scored); Rasmussen (penalty scored); Reginiussen (penalty scored)		(penalty scored) Lauritsen; (penalty scored) Ruud; (penalty scored) Nordkvelle; (penalty scored) Risa; (penalty scored) Bergan; (penalty scored) Njie; (penalty missed) Hoff

== Squad statistics ==
As of match played 24 November 2018

=== Appearances and goals ===
No.	Pos	Nat	Player	Total		Eliteserien		Norwegian Cup	
No.	Pos	Nat	Player	Apps	Goals	Apps	Goals	Apps	Goals
1	GK	(Norway) NOR	Sondre Rossbach	29	0	28	0	1	0
2	DF	(Norway) NOR	Espen Ruud	33	8	29	8	3+1	0
3	DF	(Norway) NOR	Fredrik Semb Berge	5	0	5	0	0	0
4	DF	(Norway) NOR	Vegard Bergan	34	1	27+3	1	4	0
6	MF	(Norway) NOR	Vebjørn Hoff	30	0	27	0	3	0
7	MF	(Sweden) SWE	Martin Broberg	25	5	17+7	4	1	1
8	MF	(Norway) NOR	Jone Samuelsen	24	0	21+2	0	1	0
9	FW	(Norway) NOR	Birk Risa	29	2	26	1	2+1	1
11	FW	(Kosovo) KOS	Elbasan Rashani	31	8	26+1	6	1+3	2
12	GK	(Norway) NOR	Viljar Myhra	5	0	2	0	3	0
13	MF	(Norway) NOR	Stefan Mladenovic	20	3	4+13	1	2+1	2
14	MF	(Norway) NOR	Fredrik Nordkvelle	27	2	14+10	2	2+1	0
15	DF	(Norway) NOR	Andreas Nordvik	2	0	0+2	0	0	0
16	MF	(Norway) NOR	Joshua Kitolano	17	1	8+8	0	1	1
17	MF	(Norway) NOR	Markus Andreas Kaasa	22	1	14+4	1	4	0
18	DF	(Norway) NOR	Odin Bjørtuft	3	0	0+2	0	1	0
19	MF	(Norway) NOR	Bilal Njie	26	4	14+8	3	4	1
20	MF	(Norway) NOR	Tobias Lauritsen	22	8	4+14	1	3+1	7
21	DF	(Norway) NOR	Steffen Hagen	33	1	29+1	1	3	0
22	MF	(Norway) NOR	Torgeir Børven	21	5	15+5	5	0+1	0
23	FW	(Norway) NOR	Marius Larsen	1	0	0+1	0	0	0
24	MF	(Norway) NOR	André Sødlund	5	0	2+3	0	0	0
29	MF	(Norway) NOR	Delaveris	1	0	0+1	0	0	0
Players away from Odd on loan:
Players who left Odd during the season:
5	DF	(Norway) NOR	Thomas Grøgaard	17	0	12+2	0	1+2	0
24	DF	(Norway) NOR	John Kitolano	10	0	6	0	4	0

=== Goal scorers ===
Place	Position	Nation	Number	Name	Eliteserien	Norwegian Cup	Total
1	FW	(Kosovo)	11	Elbasan Rashani	7	2	9
2	DF	(Norway)	2	Espen Ruud	8	0	8
2	MF	(Norway)	20	Tobias Lauritsen	1	7	8
4	MF	(Norway)	22	Torgeir Børven	5	0	5
4	MF	(Sweden)	7	Martin Broberg	4	1	5
6	MF	(Norway)	19	Bilal Njie	3	1	4
6				Own goal	4	0	4
8	MF	(Norway)	13	Stefan Mladenovic	1	2	3
9	MF	(Norway)	14	Fredrik Nordkvelle	2	0	2
9	FW	(Norway)	9	Birk Risa	1	1	2
11	MF	(Norway)	17	Markus Andreas Kaasa	1	0	1
11	DF	(Norway)	4	Vegard Bergan	1	0	1
11	DF	(Norway)	21	Steffen Hagen	1	0	1
11	MF	(Norway)	16	Joshua Kitolano	0	1	1
				TOTALS	39	15	54

=== Disciplinary record ===
Number	Nation	Position	Name	Eliteserien		Norwegian Cup		Total	
Number	Nation	Position	Name	Booked	Sent off (straight red)	Booked	Sent off (straight red)	Booked	Sent off (straight red)
1	(Norway)	GK	Sondre Rossbach	3	0	0	0	3	0
2	(Norway)	DF	Espen Ruud	5	0	0	0	5	0
4	(Norway)	DF	Vegard Bergan	1	0	0	0	1	0
6	(Norway)	MF	Vebjørn Hoff	3	0	0	0	3	0
7	(Sweden)	MF	Martin Broberg	3	0	0	0	3	0
8	(Norway)	MF	Jone Samuelsen	5	0	0	0	5	0
9	(Norway)	FW	Birk Risa	3	0	0	0	3	0
11	(Kosovo)	FW	Elbasan Rashani	5	0	1	0	6	0
17	(Norway)	MF	Markus Andreas Kaasa	1	0	0	0	1	0
19	(Norway)	MF	Bilal Njie	1	0	0	0	1	0
			TOTALS	30	0	1	0	31	0
