= Kitolano =

Kitolano is a surname. Notable people with this surname include:

- John Kitolano (born 1999), Congolese-Norwegian football player
- Joshua Kitolano (born 2001), Norwegian football player
