= Tobias Lauritsen =

Norwegian footballer (born 1997)

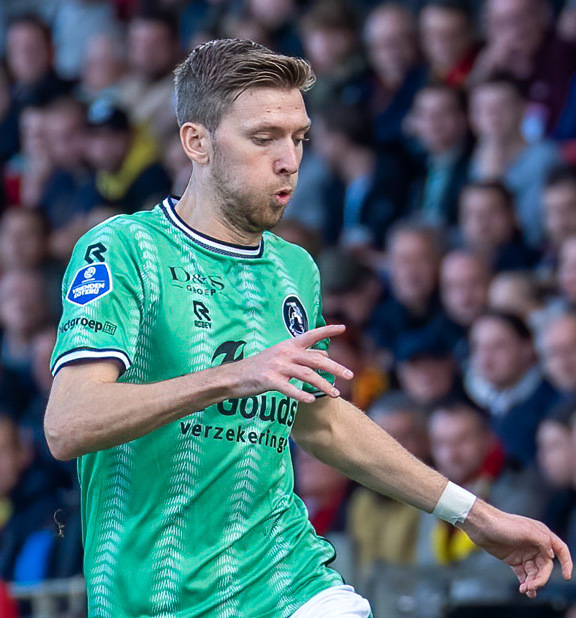
- Lauritsen playing for Sparta Rotterdam in 2023

Personal information
- Date of birth: 30 August 1997 (age 29)
- Place of birth: Skien, Norway
- Height: 1.91 m (6 ft 3 in)
- Position: Forward

Team information
- Current team: Sampdoria

Youth career
- Herkules

Senior career*
Years	Team	Apps	(Gls)
2013	Herkules	4	(0)
2013–2014	Urædd	20	(11)
2014–2016	Odd	0	(0)
2016–2017	Pors	29	(33)
2018–2022	Odd	103	(18)
2022–2026	Sparta Rotterdam	131	(47)
2026–	Sampdoria	0	(0)
- * Club domestic league appearances and goals as of 17 May 2026

Tobias Lauritsen (born 30 August 1997) is a Norwegian professional footballer who plays as a forward for Serie B side Sampdoria.

== Career ==
Lauritsen started his career in Herkules and got his first-team debut in 2013. Midway in the season Herkules had to pull its team from league play, making the entire player roster available for transfer. Lauritsen went to Urædd FK together with Kevin Jablinski among others. One year later, Lauritsen progressed to the regional giants Odds BK where Jablinski had already gone.

Lauritsen made his Odd debut in the 2015 Norwegian Football Cup first round, coming off the bench and scoring in a 13–0 thrashing of Skotfoss. He then mainly saw playing time for Odds BK 2, the B team, in the 2015 2. divisjon, playing one more first-team game, the first leg of the 2016 Norwegian Football Cup.

In the summer of 2016 Odd picked up the talent Stefan Mladenovic from another neighboring club Pors, and Pors wanted Lauritsen and other players in a player exchange deal. The deal did not go through, but in September 2016 Lauritsen joined Pors anyway. Sustaining an injury in his debut game, Lauritsen could not prevent relegation from the 2016 2. divisjon, but in the 2017 3. divisjon he scored 32 goals in 26 league games. As a result he was bought by his old club Odd. He finally made his Eliteserien debut, as a substitute in the league opener against Haugesund, and in the first round of the 2018 Norwegian Football Cup he bagged four goals.

On 21 June 2022, Lauritsen signed a three-year contract with Dutch club Sparta Rotterdam that came into effect at the end of July 2022.

On 18 July 2026, Lauritsen moved to Sampdoria in Italy on a three-season deal.

== Career statistics ==
As of match played 17 May 2026

Appearances and goals by club, season and competition
Club	Season	League			National cup (Note: Includes Norwegian Football Cup, KNVB Cup)		Other		Total	
Club	Season	Division	Apps	Goals	Apps	Goals	Apps	Goals	Apps	Goals
Herkules	2013	Norwegian Third Division	4	0	2	1	–		6	1
Urædd	2013	Norwegian Third Division	9	4	0	0	–		9	4
Urædd	2014	Norwegian Third Division	11	1	2	0	–		13	1
Urædd	Total		20	5	2	0	–		22	5
Odd	2014	Eliteserien	0	0	0	0	–		0	0
Odd	2015	Eliteserien	0	0	1	1	–		1	1
Odd	2016	Eliteserien	0	0	0	0	–		0	0
Odd	Total		0	0	1	1	–		1	1
Pors Grenland	2016	Norwegian Second Division	3	1	0	0	–		3	1
Pors Grenland	2017	Norwegian Third Division	26	32	2	1	–		28	33
Pors Grenland	Total		29	33	2	1	–		31	34
Odd	2018	Eliteserien	18	1	4	7	–		22	8
Odd	2019	Eliteserien	21	0	6	6	–		27	6
Odd	2020	Eliteserien	20	3	0	0	–		20	3
Odd	2021	Eliteserien	29	8	3	1	–		32	9
Odd	2022	Eliteserien	15	6	2	0	–		17	6
Odd	Total		103	18	15	14	–		118	32
Sparta Rotterdam	2022–23	Eredivisie	34	12	2	2	0	0	36	14
Sparta Rotterdam	2023–24	Eredivisie	31	12	1	0	1 (Note: Appearance in Eredivisie European play-offs)	1	33	13
Sparta Rotterdam	2024–25	Eredivisie	32	10	1	0	0	0	33	10
Sparta Rotterdam	2025–26	Eredivisie	34	12	3	2	—		37	14
Sparta Rotterdam	Total		131	47	7	4	1	1	139	52
Career total			287	103	29	19	1	1	317	123

== Honours ==
Individual

- Eredivisie Team of the Month: November 2022, August 2023
