= Joshua Kitolano =

Norwegian footballer (born 2001)

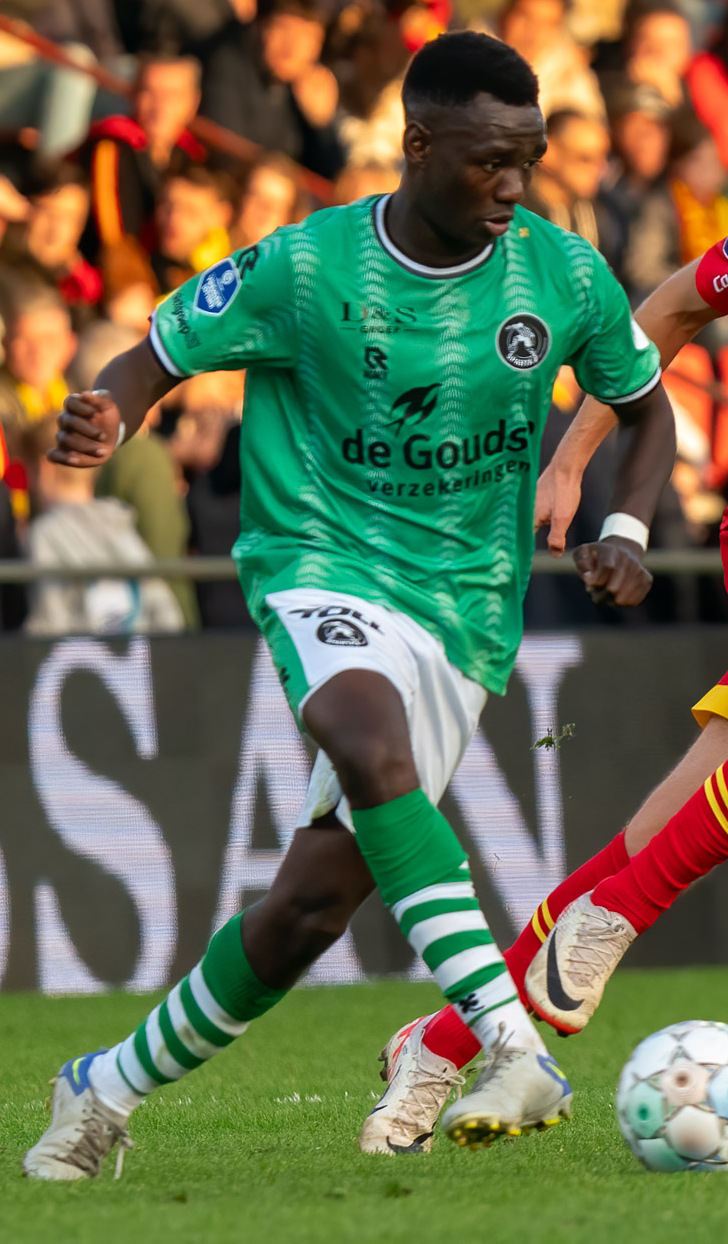
- Kitolano with Sparta Rotterdam in 2023

Personal information
- Full name: Joshua Gaston Kitolano
- Date of birth: 3 August 2001 (age 25)
- Place of birth: Likasi, DR Congo
- Height: 1.70 m (5 ft 7 in)
- Position: Midfielder

Team information
- Current team: Bodø/Glimt
- Number: 16

Youth career
- –2017: Gulset
- 2017: Odd

Senior career*
Years	Team	Apps	(Gls)
2018–2022	Odd	108	(7)
2022–2026	Sparta Rotterdam	117	(14)
2026–	Bodø/Glimt	8	(0)

International career^{‡}
2016	Norway U15	8	(1)
2017	Norway U16	14	(2)
2018	Norway U17	12	(2)
2019	Norway U18	9	(0)
2019	Norway U19	6	(0)
2021	Norway U20	1	(0)
2020–2023	Norway U21	9	(0)
- * Club domestic league appearances and goals as of 20 November 2026 ‡ National team caps and goals as of 28 June 2023

Joshua Gaston Kitolano (born 3 August 2001) is a Norwegian professional footballer who plays as midfielder for the Eliteserien club Bodø/Glimt.

== Club career ==
On 21 June 2022, Kitolano signed a four-year contract with Dutch club Sparta Rotterdam that came into effect at the end of July 2022. He moved together with fellow Odd player Tobias Lauritsen.

On 25 May 2026, Kitolano signed with Bodø/Glimt, returning to Norway.

== Personal life ==
Kitolano was born in DR Congo. He has seven siblings and came to Norway from DR Congo in October 2005. Kitolano's older brother John plays for Aalesund, whilst his oldest brother Eric plays for Lillestrøm.

== Career statistics ==
=== Club ===
As of match played 20 November 2026

Appearances and goals by club, season and competition
Club	Season	League			National Cup		Continental		Other		Total	
Club	Season	Division	Apps	Goals	Apps	Goals	Apps	Goals	Apps	Goals	Apps	Goals
Odd	2018	Eliteserien	16	0	0	0	—				16	0
Odd	2019	Eliteserien	21	1	5	1	—				26	2
Odd	2020	Eliteserien	27	4	—		—				27	4
Odd	2021	Eliteserien	28	2	3	0	—				31	2
Odd	2022	Eliteserien	16	0	1	0	—				17	0
Odd	Total		108	7	9	1	0	0	0	0	117	8
Sparta Rotterdam	2022–23	Eredivisie	34	4	1	0	—		0	0	35	4
Sparta Rotterdam	2023–24	Eredivisie	24	4	2	0	—		—		26	4
Sparta Rotterdam	2024–25	Eredivisie	27	0	1	0	—		0	0	28	0
Sparta Rotterdam	2025–26	Eredivisie	33	5	1	0	—		—		34	5
Sparta Rotterdam	Total		117	13	5	0	0	0	0	0	122	13
Bodø/Glimt	2026	Eliteserien	8	0	2	1	5	0	—		15	1
Career total			233	20	16	2	5	0	0	0	254	22
