= Rafik Zekhnini =

Norwegian footballer (born 1998)

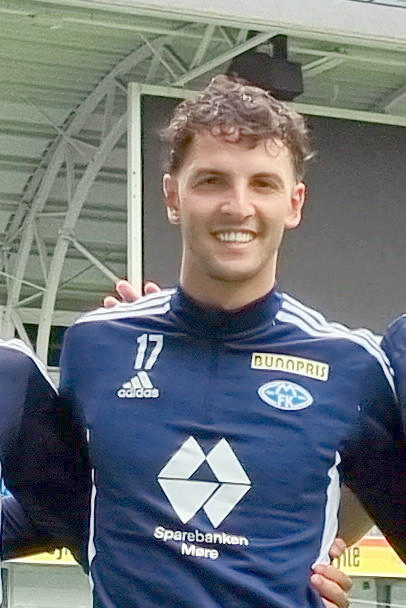
- Rafik Zekhnini, No. 17 on Molde's A team

Personal information
- Date of birth: 12 January 1998 (age 28)
- Place of birth: Skien, Norway
- Height: 1.79 m (5 ft 10 in)
- Position: Winger

Team information
- Current team: Raufoss
- Number: 27

Senior career*
Years	Team	Apps	(Gls)
2015–2017	Odd	46	(8)
2017–2021	Fiorentina	1	(0)
2018	→ Rosenborg (loan)	6	(0)
2018–2020	→ Twente (loan)	48	(6)
2020–2021	→ Lausanne-Sport (loan)	15	(2)
2021–2023	Molde	28	(2)
2023–2024	Sarpsborg 08	18	(1)
2025–2026	Odd	26	(4)
2026–	Raufoss	20	(5)

International career
2013	Norway U15	4	(0)
2014	Norway U16	6	(0)
2015	Norway U17	6	(0)
2015	Norway U18	4	(0)
2016–2019	Norway U21	8	(0)
- * Club domestic league appearances and goals as of 14 November 2026

Rafik Zekhnini (born 12 January 1998) is a Norwegian professional footballer who plays as a forward for 1. divisjon club Raufoss.

== Career ==
Zekhnini started his career at Herøya IL, before joining the youth academy of Odds BK in 2013. He signed a professional contract with the club 12 January 2015, and made his debut in a cup match in April the same year. He made his league debut 12 July, against Rosenborg, and scored his first goal, two weeks later, in extra time against Tromsø. Zekhnini had his big breakthrough during the play-off matches in the Europa League qualification against Borussia Dortmund in August 2015. He got an assist after just 16 seconds in the first play-off match at Skagerak Arena. After those matches, he received a lot of attention from several big clubs, including Borussia Dortmund and Manchester United.

On 16 July 2017, Zekhnini signed a five-year contract with the Serie A club Fiorentina for a reported fee of €1.5 million. On 4 April 2018, he returned to Norway to join Rosenborg on loan until the end of the Serie A season.

On 29 August 2018, Zekhnini was loaned to the Dutch second tier team Twente on a season-long loan. Zekhnini did a good performance during his one year loan playing in the Dutch second tier league. Twente won the league and was promoted to play in the Eredivisie in the 2019-20 season. In July 2019, Twente announced that Zekhnini would spend another year on loan from Fiorentina.

== Personal life ==
Zekhnini is of Moroccan descent.

== Career statistics ==
As of 24 October 2026

Club	Season	League			Cup		Europa League		Total	
Club	Season	Division	Apps	Goals	Apps	Goals	Apps	Goals	Apps	Goals
Odd	2015	Tippeligaen	11	2	1	1	4	0	17	3
Odd	2016	Tippeligaen	22	5	2	0	3	0	27	5
Odd	2017	Eliteserien	13	1	1	0	2	0	16	1
Odd	Total		46	8	4	1	9	0	59	9
Fiorentina	2017–18	Serie A	1	0	0	0	0	0	1	0
Rosenborg (loan)	2018	Eliteserien	6	0	3	1	0	0	9	1
Twente (loan)	2018–2019	Eerste Divisie	27	5	2	1	0	0	29	6
Twente (loan)	2019–2020	Eredivisie	21	1	1	0	0	0	22	1
Twente (loan)	Total		48	6	3	1	0	0	51	7
Lausanne-Sport (loan)	2020–21	Swiss Super League	15	2	0	0	0	0	15	2
Molde	2021	Eliteserien	12	0	0	0	0	0	12	0
Molde	2022	Eliteserien	15	2	4	1	5	0	24	3
Molde	2023	Eliteserien	1	0	3	0	0	0	4	0
Molde	Total		28	2	7	1	5	0	40	3
Sarpsborg 08	2023	Eliteserien	11	1	0	0	0	0	11	1
Sarpsborg 08	2024	Eliteserien	7	0	4	1	0	0	11	1
Sarpsborg 08	Total		18	1	4	1	0	0	22	2
Odd	2025	OBOS-ligaen	26	3	3	0	0	0	29	3
Raufoss	2026	OBOS-ligaen	19	4	1	1	0	0	20	5
Career total			207	26	25	6	14	0	246	32

== Honours ==
Molde

- Eliteserien: 2022
- Norwegian Cup: 2021–22
