= John Kitolano =

Norwegian footballer (born 1999)

Personal information
- Full name: John Shuguto Kitolano
- Date of birth: 18 October 1999 (age 27)
- Place of birth: DR Congo
- Height: 1.74 m (5 ft 9 in)
- Position: Left-back

Team information
- Current team: Kristiansund
- Number: 25

Youth career
- –2013: Gulset
- 2014–2016: Odd

Senior career*
Years	Team	Apps	(Gls)
2017–2018	Odd	11	(0)
2018–2021	Wolverhampton Wanderers	0	(0)
2020	→ Molde (loan)	10	(1)
2020	→ Odd (loan)	8	(0)
2021–2022	Odd	43	(0)
2022–2025	Aalesund	71	(1)
2026	Lillestrøm	0	(0)
2026–	Kristiansund	0	(0)

International career^{‡}
2014	Norway U15	2	(0)
2015	Norway U16	9	(0)
2016	Norway U17	9	(0)
2017	Norway U18	3	(0)
2017–2018	Norway U19	11	(0)
2019	Norway U20	3	(0)
- * Club domestic league appearances and goals as of 25 August 2026 ‡ National team caps and goals as of 27 May 2019

John Shuguto Kitolano (born 18 October 1999) is a Norwegian professional footballer who plays as left-back for Eliteserien club Kristiansund.

== Club career ==
On 9 August 2018, Kitolano moved to Wolverhampton Wanderers for an undisclosed fee.

On 20 January 2020, Kitolano joined Molde on loan until the end of the 2021 season.

On 2 March 2026, Kitolano joined Lillestrøm on a contract until end of 2026. He joined his older brother Eric, who already plays there.

== International career ==
Kitolano has played a total of 37 games for Norway at international youth level.

== Personal life ==
Kitolano, who has seven siblings, came to Norway from DR Congo in October 2005. Kitolano's younger brother Joshua plays for Sparta Rotterdam, whilst older brother Eric plays for Lillestrøm.

== Career statistics ==
As of match played 7 March 2026

Appearances and goals by club, season and competition
Club	Season	League			National cup		Continental		Other		Total	
Club	Season	Division	Apps	Goals	Apps	Goals	Apps	Goals	Apps	Goals	Apps	Goals
Odd	2017	Eliteserien	4	0	4	0	2 (Note: Appearance(s) in UEFA Europa League qualifying rounds)	0	—		10	0
Odd	2018	Eliteserien	7	0	4	0	—		—		11	0
Odd	Total		11	0	8	0	2	0	—	—	21	0
Wolverhampton Wanderers U23s	2018–19	—			—		—		—		0	0
Wolverhampton Wanderers U23s	2019–20	—			—		—		1 (Note: Appearance in EFL Trophy)	0	1	0
Wolverhampton Wanderers U23s	Total		0	0	0	0	0	0	1	0	1	0
Molde (loan)	2020	Eliteserien	10	1	—		—		—		10	1
Odd (loan)	2020	Eliteserien	8	0	—		—		—		8	0
Odd	2021	Eliteserien	27	0	2	0	—		—		29	0
Odd	2022	Eliteserien	16	0	1	0	—		—		17	0
Odd	Total		43	0	3	0	0	0	0	0	46	0
Aalesund	2022	Eliteserien	8	0	0	0	—		—		8	0
Aalesund	2023	Eliteserien	25	0	1	0	—		—		26	0
Aalesund	2024	1. divisjon	20	1	0	0	—		—		20	1
Aalesund	2025	1. divisjon	18	0	3	0	—		—		21	0
Aalesund	Total		71	1	4	0	0	0	0	0	75	1
Lillestrøm	2026	Eliteserien	0	0	1	0	—		—		1	0
Kristiansund	2026	Eliteserien	0	0	0	0	—		—		0	0
Career total			143	2	16	0	2	0	1	0	162	2
