= Oliver Berg =

Norwegian footballer (born 1993)

Personal information
- Full name: Oliver Berg
- Date of birth: 28 August 1993 (age 33)
- Place of birth: Gjøvik, Norway
- Height: 1.78 m (5 ft 10 in)
- Position: Midfielder

Team information
- Current team: IF Brommapojkarna
- Number: 10

Youth career
- Gjøvik-Lyn
- Raufoss

Senior career*
Years	Team	Apps	(Gls)
2010–2014	Raufoss	69	(27)
2015–2018	Odd	55	(1)
2018	Dalkurd	13	(1)
2018–2020	GIF Sundsvall	66	(11)
2021–2022	Kalmar FF	59	(21)
2023	Djurgården	19	(3)
2023–2025	Malmö FF	67	(3)
2026–	IF Brommapojkarna	10	(2)
- * Club domestic league appearances and goals as of 8 July 2026 2026

Oliver Berg (born 28 August 1993) is a Norwegian footballer who plays for IF Brommapojkarna in Allsvenskan.

== Honours ==
Malmö FF

- Allsvenskan: 2023, 2024
