= Martin Broberg =

Swedish footballer

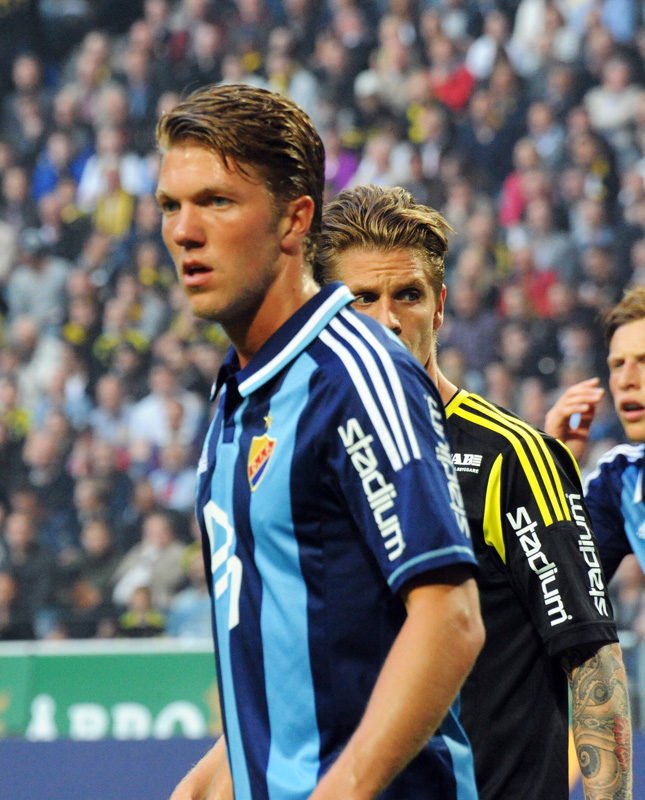
- Broberg playing for Djurgårdens IF in 2013

Personal information
- Full name: Erik Martin Broberg
- Date of birth: 24 September 1990 (age 36)
- Place of birth: Karlskoga, Sweden
- Height: 1.83 m (6 ft 0 in)
- Position: Midfielder

Youth career
- Karlskoga SK
- –2006: KB Karlskoga
- 2007–2008: Degerfors IF

Senior career*
Years	Team	Apps	(Gls)
2009–2011	Degerfors IF	72	(4)
2012–2015	Djurgårdens IF	60	(5)
2015–2016	Örebro SK	36	(12)
2017–2019	Odd	43	(5)
2019–2023	Örebro SK	33	(3)
- * Club domestic league appearances and goals

Erik Martin Broberg (born 24 September 1990) is a Swedish former footballer who played as a midfielder.

== Career statistics ==
Club performance			League		Cup		Continental		Total	
Club	Season	League	Apps	Goals	Apps	Goals	Apps	Goals	Apps	Goals
Sweden			League		Svenska Cupen		Europe		Total	
Degerfors IF	2009	Division 1	23	1	0	0	—		23	1
Degerfors IF	2010	Superettan	25	1	1	0	—		26	1
Degerfors IF	2011	Superettan	24	2	0	0	—		24	2
Djurgårdens IF	2012	Allsvenskan	9	0	0	0	—		9	0
Djurgårdens IF	2013	Allsvenskan	24	1	3	0	—		27	1
Djurgårdens IF	2014	Allsvenskan	27	4	3	0	—		30	4
Djurgårdens IF	2015	Allsvenskan	0	0	1	0	—		1	0
Örebro SK	2015	Allsvenskan	15	10	0	0	—		15	10
Örebro SK	2016	Allsvenskan	21	2	0	0	—		21	2
Odd	2017	Eliteserien	19	1	1	0	5	1	21	2
Odd	2018	Eliteserien	14	4	1	1	0	0	15	5
Career total			201	26	10	1	5	1	216	28
