= Fredrik Oldrup Jensen =

Norwegian footballer (born 1993)

Personal information
- Date of birth: 18 May 1993 (age 33)
- Place of birth: Skien, Norway
- Height: 1.85 m (6 ft 1 in)
- Position: Midfielder

Team information
- Current team: NAC Breda
- Number: 20

Youth career
- Odd

Senior career*
Years	Team	Apps	(Gls)
2012–2017	Odd	129	(5)
2017–2020	Zulte Waregem	12	(0)
2018	→ IFK Göteborg (loan)	12	(0)
2019	→ Odd (loan)	22	(1)
2020–2024	Vålerenga	105	(3)
2024–	NAC Breda	50	(1)

International career
2010	Norway U17	2	(0)
2013–2014	Norway U21	5	(0)
2014	Norway U23	1	(0)
- * Club domestic league appearances and goals as of 21 May 2026

Fredrik Oldrup Jensen (born 18 May 1993) is a Norwegian professional footballer who plays as a midfielder for Dutch Eerste Divisie club NAC Breda.

== Career ==
Oldrup Jensen made his senior debut on 9 April 2012 against Lillestrøm; they won the game 2–0.

On 25 July 2017, Jensen signed a four-year contract with Belgium side Zulte Waregem.

On 14 February 2020, Jensen signed a two-year contract with Norwegian side Vålerenga.

On 16 January 2024, Jensen moved to NAC Breda in the Netherlands on a 1.5-year contract.

== Career statistics ==
As of match played 24 April 2025

Appearances and goals by club, season and competition
Club	Season	League			Cup		Other		Total	
Club	Season	Division	Apps	Goals	Apps	Goals	Apps	Goals	Apps	Goals
Odd	2012	Eliteserien	8	0	2	0	0	0	10	0
Odd	2013	Eliteserien	29	1	1	0	0	0	30	1
Odd	2014	Eliteserien	29	1	5	0	0	0	34	1
Odd	2015	Eliteserien	23	2	3	0	5 (Note: Appearances in the Europa League)	0	31	2
Odd	2016	Eliteserien	27	0	3	1	4	0	34	1
Odd	2017	Eliteserien	13	1	2	0	4	0	19	1
Odd	Total		129	5	16	1	13	0	158	6
Zulte Waregem	2017–18	First Division A	12	0	0	0	0	0	12	0
IFK Göteborg (loan)	2018	Allsvenskan	12	0	0	0	0	0	12	0
Odd (loan)	2019	Eliteserien	22	1	1	0	0	0	23	1
Vålerenga	2020	Eliteserien	21	1	0	0	0	0	21	1
Vålerenga	2021	Eliteserien	30	2	3	1	1 (Note: Appearances in the Conference League)	0	34	3
Vålerenga	2022	Eliteserien	26	0	1	0	0	0	27	0
Vålerenga	2023	Eliteserien	28	0	6	1	0	0	34	1
Vålerenga	Total		105	3	10	2	1	0	116	5
NAC Breda	2023–24	Eerste Divisie	15	1	0	0	0	0	15	1
NAC Breda	2024–25	Eredivisie	21	0	0	0	0	0	21	0
NAC Breda	Total		36	1	0	0	0	0	36	1
Career total			316	10	27	3	14	0	357	13
