= Vegard Bergan =

Norwegian footballer (born 1995)

Personal information
- Full name: Vegard Amundsen Bergan
- Date of birth: 20 February 1995 (age 31)
- Place of birth: Porsgrunn, Norway
- Height: 1.93 m (6 ft 4 in)
- Position: Defender

Team information
- Current team: Start
- Number: 3

Youth career
- Hei
- 2012: Odd

Senior career*
Years	Team	Apps	(Gls)
2011	Hei	1	(0)
2013–2018	Odd	63	(1)
2019	Bodø/Glimt	21	(1)
2020–	Start	39	(0)

International career
2011	Norway U16	3	(0)
2012	Norway U17	2	(0)
2013	Norway U18	13	(1)
2014	Norway U19	4	(1)
2014-2015	Norway U21	4	(0)
- * Club domestic league appearances and goals as of 11 August 2021

Vegard Amundsen Bergan (born 20 February 1995) is a Norwegian footballer who plays for Start.

== Career statistics ==
=== Club ===
As of match played 31 July 2021

Appearances and goals by club, season and competition
Club	Season	League			National Cup		Continental		Total	
Club	Season	Division	Apps	Goals	Apps	Goals	Apps	Goals	Apps	Goals
Odd	2013	Tippeligaen	1	0	0	0	-		1	0
Odd	2014	Tippeligaen	5	0	4	0	-		9	0
Odd	2015	Tippeligaen	6	0	4	0	5	0	15	0
Odd	2016	Tippeligaen	5	0	2	1	2	0	9	1
Odd	2017	Eliteserien	16	0	4	0	1	0	21	0
Odd	2018	Eliteserien	30	1	4	0	-		34	1
Odd	Total		63	1	18	1	8	0	89	2
Bodø/Glimt	2019	Eliteserien	21	1	1	0	-		22	1
Bodø/Glimt	Total		21	1	1	0	-	-	22	1
Start	2020	Eliteserien	27	0	0	0	-		27	0
Start	2021	OBOS-ligaen	12	0	2	0	-		14	0
Start	Total		39	0	2	0	-	-	41	0
Career total			123	2	21	1	8	0	152	3
