= Fredrik Nordkvelle =

Norwegian footballer (born 1985)

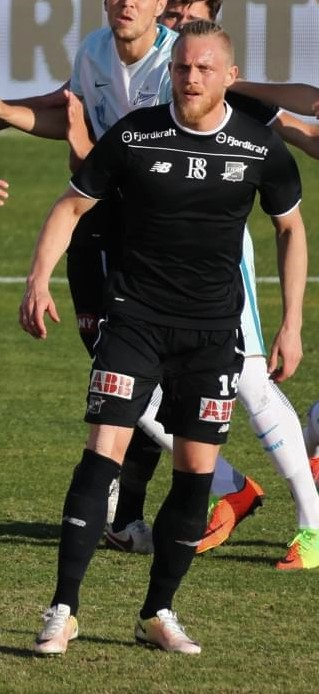
- Nordkvelle playing for Odd in 2017

Personal information
- Full name: Fredrik Lund Nordkvelle
- Date of birth: 13 September 1985 (age 41)
- Place of birth: Porsgrunn, Norway
- Height: 1.80 m (5 ft 11 in)
- Position: Midfielder

Team information
- Current team: Urædd

Youth career
- Stridsklev
- Eidanger
- Urædd

Senior career*
Years	Team	Apps	(Gls)
2004–2007	Pors Grenland	51	(6)
2007–2011	Strømsgodset	110	(15)
2012–2013	Brann	37	(4)
2013–2020	Odd	169	(26)
2021–	Urædd	4	(2)
- * Club domestic league appearances and goals as of 13 September 2021

Fredrik Nordkvelle (born 13 September 1985) is a Norwegian footballer who plays as a midfielder for Urædd.

== Career ==
Nordkvelle hails from Porsgrunn. He joined Strømsgodset during the 2007 season after impressing coach Dag-Eilev Fagermo whilst on trial at Marienlyst. In 2008 Nordkvelle's superb solo strike in the league match away at Aalesund was voted as goal of the season by TV 2 viewers.

On 30 August 2011, Nordkvelle signed a contract with Brann where he will play from the beginning of the 2012 season.

On 11 August 2013 Odd confirmed that they had signed Nordkvelle just 15 minutes before the transferwindow closed. Nordkvelle signed a contract that will keep him in Skien for 4,5 years.

== Career statistics ==
=== Club ===
As of match played 4 November 2020

Appearances and goals by club, season and competition
Club	Season	League			National Cup		Continental		Total	
Club	Season	Division	Apps	Goals	Apps	Goals	Apps	Goals	Apps	Goals
Pors Grenland	2004	1. divisjon	13	1	2	0	-		15	1
Pors Grenland	2005	1. divisjon	13	0	3	0	-		16	0
Pors Grenland	2006	1. divisjon	25	5	0	0	-		25	5
Pors Grenland	Total		51	6	0	0	-	-	56	6
Strømsgodset	2007	Eliteserien	9	0	2	0	-		11	0
Strømsgodset	2008	Eliteserien	21	1	3	0	-		24	1
Strømsgodset	2009	Eliteserien	27	5	1	0	-		28	5
Strømsgodset	2010	Eliteserien	24	4	4	1	-		28	5
Strømsgodset	2011	Eliteserien	29	5	4	1	2	0	35	6
Strømsgodset	Total		110	15	14	2	2	0	126	17
Brann	2012	Eliteserien	24	2	4	1	-		28	3
Brann	2013	Eliteserien	13	2	1	0	-		14	2
Brann	Total		37	4	5	1	-	-	42	5
Odd	2013	Eliteserien	2	0	0	0	-		2	0
Odd	2014	Eliteserien	26	1	7	1	-		33	2
Odd	2015	Eliteserien	24	9	1	0	6	1	31	10
Odd	2016	Eliteserien	29	7	2	0	3	1	34	8
Odd	2017	Eliteserien	21	1	1	0	4	0	26	1
Odd	2018	Eliteserien	24	2	3	0	-		27	2
Odd	2019	Eliteserien	23	5	5	0	-		28	5
Odd	2020	Eliteserien	20	1	0	0	-		20	1
Odd	Total		169	26	19	1	13	2	201	29
Career total			367	51	38	4	15	2	425	57
