= Fredrik Semb Berge =

Norwegian footballer (born 1990)

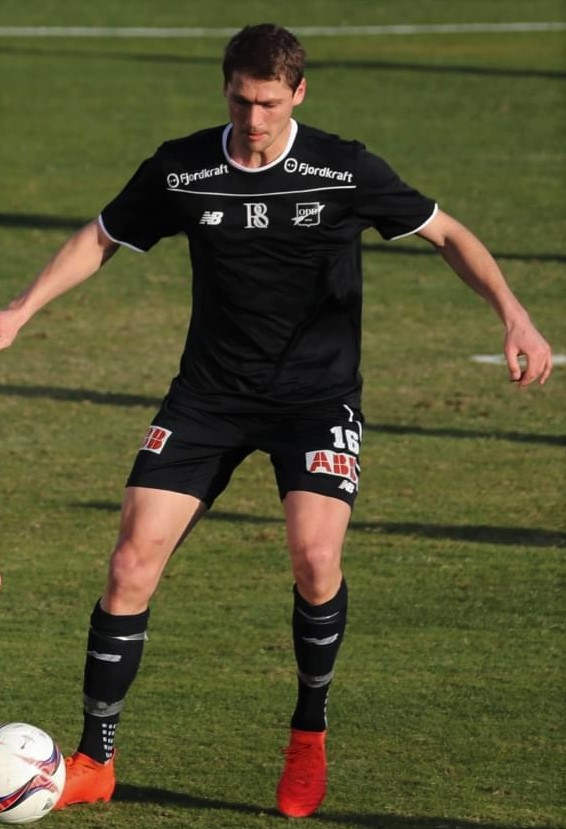

Personal information
- Full name: Fredrik Semb Berge
- Date of birth: 6 February 1990 (age 36)
- Place of birth: Skien, Norway
- Height: 1.89 m (6 ft 2 1/2 in)
- Position: Defender

Youth career
- –2004: Storm
- 2005–2007: Odd

Senior career*
Years	Team	Apps	(Gls)
2008–2014	Odd	95	(5)
2014–2016	Brøndby IF	7	(1)
2015	→ Molde (loan)	10	(1)
2016–2020	Odd	70	(6)
2022-	Gjerpen	31	(23)

International career^{‡}
2005	Norway U15	6	(0)
2006	Norway U16	1	(0)
2008	Norway U18	1	(1)
2010–2013	Norway U21	12	(1)
2013–	Norway	3	(0)
- * Club domestic league appearances and goals as of 22 October 2023 ‡ National team caps and goals as of 10 June 2013

Fredrik Semb Berge (born 6 February 1990) is a Norwegian footballer who plays as a defender . Hailing from Skien, Berge joined the youth-ranks of Odd at the age of 15, and made his first-team debut in 2009. The following season, he became a regular in the team's central defence.

Berge has represented his country at youth international level, and was included in the Norwegian under-21 squad for the 2013 UEFA European Under-21 Football Championship. He has also been capped at senior level, making his debut for Norway in 2013.

== Club career ==
=== Odds BK ===
Berge was born in Skien, and started to play youth-football for Storm at the age of seven. As a youngster, Berge was troubled with injuries and had four fractures in his legs in addition to a lot of strain injuries. In 2005, he transferred to Odd Grenland. He attended the Gjerpen Lower Secondary School, and later Toppidrettsgymnaset i Telemark which has a cooperation with Odd. He made his debut for Odd's first team in the First Division match against Hønefoss on 4 October 2008, and made a total of three appearances in the 2008 season. He made his debut in Tippeligaen against Brann in May 2009. He scored his first goal for Odd in Norwegian Cup match against Brann the same season, and scored his first goal in Tippeligaen against Strømsgodset on 26 July 2010. Berge made his break-through in the 2010 season, and became a regular in Odd's central defence alongside Morten Fevang.

Molde wanted to buy Berge ahead of the 2013 season, but the 2 million kr bid for the centre back was promptly rejected by Odd. Dag-Eilev Fagermo, Odd's head coach, was furious about Molde's behaviour and claimed the back-to-back Tippeligaen winners looked down on the other Norwegian clubs after the bid for Semb Berge, which according to Fagermo was worth at least 10M kr. Odd has been struggling with the finances since 2008, and has been forced to sell their biggest profiles, and in 2013 Semb Berge was the player Odd wanted to sell. However, in May 2013 an Odd-fan who won more than 102M kr in the Eurojackpot lottery, paid 2,5M kr for a 25% share of Semb Berge, to prevent Odd from being forced to sell him for a low price to a Norwegian club.

=== Brøndby IF ===
==== Season 2014-2015 ====
On 30 June 2014 Fredrik Semb Berge made a transfer for an undisclosed fee from the Norwegian side Odds BK and signed a four-year-contract with the Danish Brøndby IF which ties him to the club until the summer 2018. Fredrik was handed jersey number 3.

== International career ==
Berge made eight appearances and scored one goals for Norwegian youth teams from under-15 level to under-18 level. He made his debut for the under-21 team against Finland U-21 in June 2010, and became a regular in the team that qualified for the 2013 UEFA European Under-21 Football Championship, normally as the third-choice centre back behind Thomas Rogne and Stefan Strandberg. Berge was also selected for the squad for the under-21 championship in Israel, as one of three centre-backs. In the second match of the championship, Berge scored Norway's first goal when England U21 was beaten 3–1.

Berge was one of six debutants at the Norwegian national team in the 1–0 friendly victory against South Africa in January 2013. Berge played 90 minutes in his first match for Norway and was praised for his performance by national team coach Egil Olsen. Berge also appeared in the friendly match against Zambia four days later.

== Career statistics ==
As of match played 8 November 2019

Season	Club	Division	League		Cup		Europe		Total	
Season	Club	Division	Apps	Goals	Apps	Goals	Apps	Goals	Apps	Goals
2008	Odd	Adeccoligaen	3	0	0	0	-		3	0
2009	Odd	Tippeligaen	5	0	4	1	-		9	1
2010	Odd	Tippeligaen	20	2	5	0	-		25	2
2011	Odd	Tippeligaen	12	0	0	0	-		12	0
2012	Odd	Tippeligaen	21	1	3	0	-		24	1
2013	Odd	Tippeligaen	23	2	2	0	-		25	2
2014	Odd	Tippeligaen	11	0	1	0	-		12	0
2014–15	Brøndby	Superliga	7	1	0	0	2	0	9	1
2015	Molde	Tippeligaen	10	1	2	0	0	0	12	1
2016	Odd	Tippeligaen	23	5	1	0	2	0	26	5
2017	Odd	Eliteserien	18	1	1	0	6	0	25	1
2018	Odd	Eliteserien	5	0	0	0	0	0	5	0
2019	Odd	Eliteserien	24	0	2	0	0	0	26	0
Career Total			182	13	21	1	10	0	213	14
