= Steffen Hagen =

Norwegian footballer (born 1986)

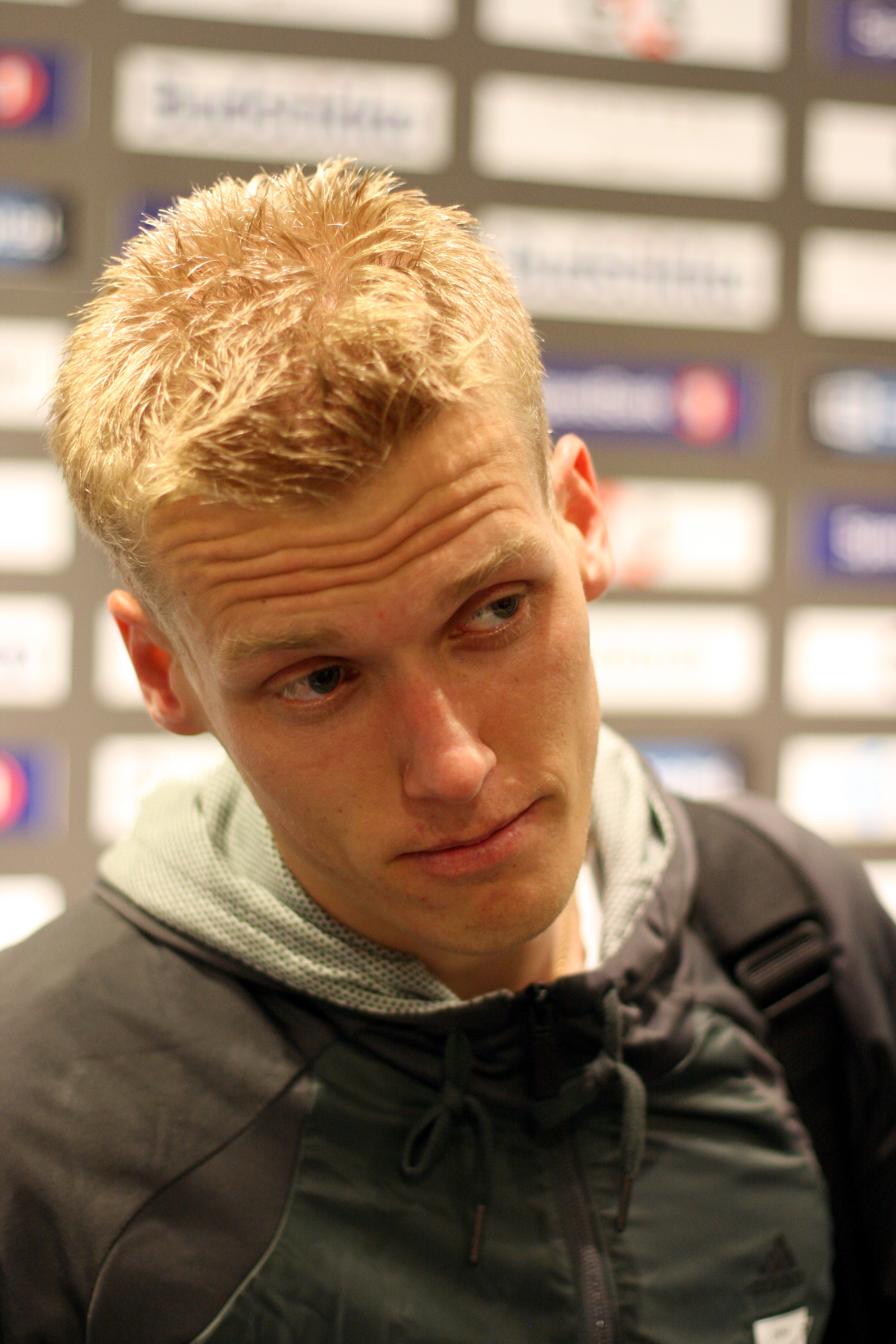

Personal information
- Full name: Steffen Hagen
- Date of birth: 8 March 1986 (age 40)
- Place of birth: Kristiansand, Norway
- Height: 1.85 m (6 ft 1 in)
- Position: Defender

Team information
- Current team: Odd
- Number: 21

Youth career
- 2001–2003: Vigør

Senior career*
Years	Team	Apps	(Gls)
2004–2006	Mandalskameratene	37	(4)
2006–2025	Odd	502	(15)

International career^{‡}
2004	Norway U18	7	(0)
2005	Norway U19	9	(0)
2005–2008	Norway U21	20	(0)
2012–2014	Norway	3	(0)
- * Club domestic league appearances and goals as of 1 December 2025 ‡ National team caps and goals as of 27 August 2014

Steffen Hagen (born 8 March 1986) is a retired Norwegian footballer who played as a defender, most famously for Odd, where he played over 500 league games. With 462 top division appearances, Hagen has made the second-highest number of appearances in Eliteserien.

He has been capped several times playing for his country at youth international level, including 20 caps for the Norwegian under-21 team, and in January 2012 Hagen made his debut for Norway national football team.

== Club career ==
=== Early career ===
Hagen was born in Kristiansand but lived in Madagascar, where his parents were missionaries, for five years. He did not start to play organized football before he moved back to Norway as a 15-year-old, and joined the local club Vigør.

Hagen transferred to the then second tier team Mandalskameratene ahead of the 2004-season. A half-year later, he was a first team regular and the 18-year-old became captain when André Herfindal was injured. The next season Hagen scored his four first goals for Mandalskameratene, but the team was relegated and Hagen was sold to the Tippeligaen side Odd.

=== Odds Ballklubb ===
After joining Odd, coach Arne Sandstø predicted that Hagen in his first season could be one of the best newcomers in Tippeligaen. Hagen made his debut in the opening match of the 2006 season, in Odd's 0–0 draw against Vålerenga. At the end of the season, Hagen had become a regular in Odd's first team starting line-up.

On 20 March 2007, Odd announced that Hagen would be the team's captain in the 2007 season. Due to injuries, Hagen was replaced as captain by Morten Fevang mid-season, and at the end of the season Odd was relegated after losing 4–2 on aggregate against Bodø/Glimt in the relegation play-offs, but Hagen missed one of the play-off matches due to an injury he got while he was on the toilet.

Hagen played 18 matches when Odd won the 2008 First Division and was promoted to Tippeligaen. The next year, Hagen played every match when Odd finished fourth in Tippeligaen, and he was the only player, along with Håkon Skogseid, that played every minute of the 30 matches in the 2009 season. In October 2009, Hagen signed a new contract with Odd till the end of the 2012-season. In the 2010 season, he again played every minute in Tippeligaen, and his head coach Dag-Eilev Fagermo claimed that Hagen and the Norway international Tom Høgli were the best full backs in Tippeligaen.

In the 2011 season Hagen played as a full back, and once again he played every league-match during the season. After the season, he was wanted by Lillestrøm, but he rejected their offer and stayed at Odd. On 14 April 2012 Hagen played his 100th consecutive league match for Odd, while playing every minute of each match. Hagen signed a new contract with Odd in July 2012, binding him to the club until the end of the 2015 season. Hagen played every minute of the 30 league-matches in the 2012 season, and in the second match of the 2013-season against Tromsø on 1 April 2013 he played his 122nd full match in a row, beating Fredrik Kjølner's old record for out-field players with 121 matches or 10,890 minutes. For the first time in 124 matches, Hagen had to leave the pitch due to an injury after 20 minutes of the match against Molde on 20 April, and was unable to beat Morten Bakke's record of 139 consecutive matches in the Norwegian top league.

== International career ==
Hagen played nine matches for Norway U-19 in 2005 and was also the team's captain. The same year he also played his first match for the under-21 team. In 2007, he was made captain of the Norway U-21, where he was capped a total of 20 times.

Hagen has been capped two times for Norway. He made his debut for the senior team in the 2012 King's Cup match against Thailand on 18 January 2012. In Norway's next match against South Korea on 21 January 2012, Hagen replaced Vegar Eggen Hedenstad after 57 minutes.

== Career statistics ==
As of 8 November 2025

Club	Season	Division	League		Cup		Other (Note: Other competitive competitions, including the Norwegian relegation/promotion play-off)		Total	
Club	Season	Division	Apps	Goals	Apps	Goals	Apps	Goals	Apps	Goals
Mandalskameratene	2004	1. divisjon	12	0	?	?	—		12	0
Mandalskameratene	2005	1. divisjon	25	4	0	0	—		25	4
Mandalskameratene	Total		37	4	0	0	—	—	37	4
Odd	2006	Tippeligaen	22	2	1	1	2	0	25	3
Odd	2007	Tippeligaen	17	0	2	0	2	0	21	0
Odd	2008	1. divisjon	18	2	2	1	—		20	3
Odd	2009	Tippeligaen	30	1	4	0	—		34	1
Odd	2010	Tippeligaen	30	2	5	0	—		35	2
Odd	2011	Tippeligaen	30	1	4	2	—		34	3
Odd	2012	Tippeligaen	30	0	4	0	—		34	0
Odd	2013	Tippeligaen	24	0	3	0	—		27	0
Odd	2014	Tippeligaen	30	1	7	0	—		37	1
Odd	2015	Tippeligaen	29	1	4	0	8	2	41	3
Odd	2016	Tippeligaen	30	1	3	0	4	0	37	1
Odd	2017	Eliteserien	27	0	4	0	5	0	36	0
Odd	2018	Eliteserien	29	1	3	0	—		32	1
Odd	2019	Eliteserien	28	2	6	0	—		34	2
Odd	2020	Eliteserien	24	0	0	0	—		24	0
Odd	2021	Eliteserien	7	0	1	0	—		8	0
Odd	2022	Eliteserien	28	0	3	1	—		31	1
Odd	2023	Eliteserien	30	0	3	0	—		33	0
Odd	2024	Eliteserien	17	1	0	0	—		17	1
Odd	2025	OBOS-ligaen	22	0	3	1	—		25	1
Total			502	15	64	6	21	2	587	23
Career Total			539	19	64	6	21	2	624	27
