= Jone Samuelsen =

Norwegian footballer (born 1984)

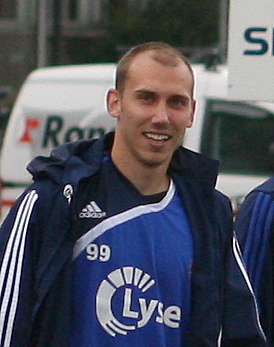
- Samuelsen in 2007

Personal information
- Date of birth: 6 July 1984 (age 42)
- Place of birth: Sunde, Norway
- Height: 1.72 m (5 ft 8 in)
- Position: Midfielder

Team information
- Current team: Storms
- Number: 8

Senior career*
Years	Team	Apps	(Gls)
2001–2003	Haugesund	50	(5)
2003–2009	Viking	105	(4)
2005	→ Skeid (loan)	13	(1)
2010–2019	Odd	233	(23)
2020–	Storms		

International career
2000	Norway U-16	5	(0)
2001	Norway U-17	5	(0)
2002	Norway U-18	11	(0)
2003	Norway U-19	6	(0)
2003	Norway U-20	2	(0)
2003–2006	Norway U-21	16	(0)
2014–2015	Norway	10	(0)
- * Club domestic league appearances and goals as of 2 August 2019

Jone Samuelsen (born 6 July 1984) is a Norwegian footballer who plays for Storms BK.

== Club career ==
Born in Stavanger, Samuelsen started his professional career with FK Haugesund in the Norwegian first division in 2001, and he was a regular in the Haugesund side throughout 2002 and 2003, during which time he also captained the Norwegian Under-19 international side. He played alongside another talented midfielder, Christian Grindheim. He collected the 2002–03 U19 fairplay award on behalf of his country.

He was brought to Viking during the 2003 season for more than NOK 2 million (£200,000), the second highest transfer fee ever paid by the club at the time. At Viking he was an instant hit, and he was called up to the Under-21 international squad on several occasions, even playing against the Brazilian U-21 squad among others where he had the responsibility to man-mark Kaká. However, the 2004 and 2005 seasons were less successful as he failed to secure a regular place in the side under Roy Hodgson. However, Vikings former coach Tom Prahl showed faith in him, and Samuelsen was a regular in the team lineup during the 2006 season.

He signed for Odd Grenland early in January 2010, for about 100.000 NOK, most of that being paid by Odd Grenlands fan club Oddrane. Because of his hard working style he quickly became a fan favorite.

Samuelsen came to international attention when he scored a header from his own half (into an open goal) in a game against Tromsø IL on 25 September 2011. The club also has plans to nominate his goal to Guinness World Records. It was measured at 57.3 metres by the local police days after the game, and re-measured to 58.13 metres a few days later. On 30 October, Ryujiro Ueda scored the only goal for his team Fagiano Okayama against Yokohama FC with his head from his own half. The distance of (immediately measured to) 58.6 metres was thought to be a new record, but it was re-measured later on to 57.8 metres, giving Samuelsen the record.

On 20 March 2020 it was confirmed, that Samuelsen had joined Storms BK together with his former Odd-teammate Håvard Storbæk.

== International career ==
After an impressive start to the 2014 season, scoring 5 goals in 10 league games from the midfield position, Samuelsen was selected by Per Mathias Høgmo for the friendly matches against France and Russia in May. He made his senior international debut on 27 May 2014, coming on as a late substitute for Mats Møller Dæhli in the game versus France in the Stade de France, a match Norway lost 4–0.

== Career statistics ==
As of 2 August 2019

Appearances and goals by club, season and competition
Club	Season	League			Norwegian Cup		Total	
Club	Season	Division	Apps	Goals	Apps	Goals	Apps	Goals
Haugesund	2002	1. divisjon	25	4	1	0	26	4
Haugesund	2003	1. divisjon	19	1	3	0	22	1
Haugesund	Total		44	5	4	0	48	5
Viking	2003	Tippeligaen	7	0	0	0	7	0
Viking	2004	Tippeligaen	15	0	1	0	16	0
Viking	2005	Tippeligaen	1	0	1	0	2	0
Viking	Total		23	0	2	0	25	0
Skeid (loan)	2005	1. divisjon	13	1	0	0	13	1
Viking	2006	Tippeligaen	21	1	2	0	23	1
Viking	2007	Tippeligaen	22	1	5	2	27	3
Viking	2008	Tippeligaen	22	2	3	0	25	2
Viking	2009	Tippeligaen	17	0	1	0	18	0
Viking	Total		82	4	11	2	93	6
Odd	2010	Tippeligaen	28	1	5	0	33	1
Odd	2011	Tippeligaen	28	3	4	1	32	4
Odd	2012	Tippeligaen	25	0	3	1	28	1
Odd	2013	Tippeligaen	27	1	2	0	29	1
Odd	2014	Tippeligaen	28	9	4	0	32	9
Odd	2015	Tippeligaen	27	4	3	0	21	2
Odd	2016	Tippeligaen	15	1	0	0	15	1
Odd	2017	Eliteserien	21	3	2	0	23	3
Odd	2018	Eliteserien	23	1	1	0	24	1
Odd	2019	Eliteserien	11	0	4	1	15	1
Odd	Total		233	23	28	3	261	26
Career total			395	33	45	5	440	38

== Honours ==
=== Individual ===
- Eliteserien Player of the Year: 2014
- Eliteserien Midfielder of the Year: 2014
