= Stefan Mladenovic =

Norwegian footballer (born 1994)

Personal information
- Date of birth: 3 April 1994 (age 32)
- Place of birth: Vukovar, Croatia
- Height: 1.79 m (5 ft 10 in)
- Position: Winger

Team information
- Current team: Pors
- Number: 10

Youth career
- –2013: Odd

Senior career*
Years	Team	Apps	(Gls)
2014–2016	Pors	51	(18)
2016–2019	Odd	51	(3)
2019–2020	Sandefjord	22	(0)
2021	Arendal	21	(1)
2022–	Pors	107	(34)
- * Club domestic league appearances and goals as of 15 November 2026

Stefan Mladenovic (Croatian: Mladenović; born 3 April 1994) is a Norwegian footballer who plays for Pors.

He is an ethnic Croat.

== Career ==
=== Sandefjord ===
Mladenovic signed with Sandefjord Fotball on 23 December 2018 for two years.

== Career statistics ==
=== Club ===
As of match played 1 July 2020

Appearances and goals by club, season and competition
Club	Season	League			National Cup		Continental		Total	
Club	Season	Division	Apps	Goals	Apps	Goals	Apps	Goals	Apps	Goals
Pors	2014	2. divisjon	17	1	0	0	-		17	1
Pors	2015	3. divisjon	21	11	3	1	-		24	12
Pors	2016	2. divisjon	13	6	1	0	-		14	6
Pors	Total		51	18	4	1	-	-	55	19
Odd	2016	Eliteserien	11	1	0	0	-		11	1
Odd	2017	Eliteserien	23	1	3	3	4	3	30	7
Odd	2018	Eliteserien	17	1	3	2	-		20	3
Odd	Total		51	3	6	5	4	3	61	11
Sandefjord	2019	1. divisjon	20	0	3	1	-		23	1
Sandefjord	2020	Eliteserien	2	0	-		-		2	0
Sandefjord	Total		22	0	3	1	-	-	25	1
Career total			124	21	13	7	4	3	141	31
