= 2014 Odds BK season =

Odd
2014 season
- Chairman: Tom Helge Rønning
- Manager: Dag-Eilev Fagermo
- Stadium: Skagerak Arena
- Tippeligaen: 3rd
- Norwegian Cup: Final
- Top goalscorer: League: Frode Johnsen (11); All: Frode Johnsen (16)
- Highest home attendance: 12,293 vs Sarpsborg 08 (25 September 2014)
- Lowest home attendance: 5,556 vs Sandnes Ulf (3 August 2014)
- Average home league attendance: 7,430
Home colours	Away colours	Third colours

Odds Ballklubb, commonly known as Odd, is a Norwegian football club from Skien. Originally the football section of a multi-sports club, founded in 1894 nine years after the club's founding. All other sports than football were discontinued and the club became dedicated to football only. Odd plays in the Norwegian top division, Tippeligaen, and holds the record winning the Norwegian Football Cup the most times, the last coming in 2000. The club was known as Odd Grenland between 1994 and 2012. During the 2014/15 the club will be participating in the Tippeliean and NM Cupen.

== Squad ==
Note: Flags indicate national team as defined under FIFA eligibility rules; some limited exceptions apply. Players may hold more than one non-FIFA nationality.

No.	Pos.	Nation	Player
1	GK	NOR	André Hansen
2	DF	NOR	Emil Jonassen
3	MF	NOR	Ardian Gashi
4	DF	NOR	Vegard Bergan
5	DF	NOR	Thomas Grøgaard
6	MF	NOR	Christer Kleiven
7	FW	NOR	Ole Jørgen Halvorsen
8	MF	NOR	Jone Samuelsen
9	MF	NOR	Henrik Kjelsrud Johansen
10	MF	NOR	Herolind Shala
11	FW	NOR	Frode Johnsen
12	GK	NOR	Sondre Løvseth Rossbach

No.	Pos.	Nation	Player
14	MF	NOR	Fredrik Nordkvelle
16	MF	NOR	Jonathan Lindseth
18	DF	FIN	Jarkko Hurme
19	FW	NOR	Snorre Krogsgård
20	MF	NOR	Fredrik Oldrup Jensen
21	DF	NOR	Steffen Hagen
22	MF	NOR	Håvard Storbæk
23	DF	NOR	Lars Kristian Eriksen
24	GK	NOR	Viljar Myhra
25	MF	NOR	Mathias Fredriksen
26	FW	NGR	Bentley

== Transfers ==
=== Winter ===
In: Note: Flags indicate national team as defined under FIFA eligibility rules; some limited exceptions apply. Players may hold more than one non-FIFA nationality.

No.	Pos.	Nation	Player
9	FW	NOR	Henrik Kjelsrud Johansen (from (Norway) Haugesund)
16	MF	NOR	Jonathan Lindseth (from (Norway) Pors)
18	DF	FIN	Jarkko Hurme (from (Finland) TPS)
26	FW	NGR	Chukwuma Akabueze (from (China) Wuhan Zall)

Out: Note: Flags indicate national team as defined under FIFA eligibility rules; some limited exceptions apply. Players may hold more than one non-FIFA nationality.

No.	Pos.	Nation	Player
4	DF	NOR	Morten Fevang (to (Norway) Notodden)
9	FW	SWE	Mattias Andersson (retired)
14	MF	NGR	George White (loan to (Norway) Strømmen made permanent)
17	DF	NOR	Niklas Gunnarsson (to (Norway) Vålerenga)
19	FW	NOR	Snorre Krogsgård (to (Norway) Fram)
27	FW	NOR	Erik Rosland
28	FW	ANG	Eriel Antonio Pires
30	MF	NOR	Tony Hieu Vo

=== Summer ===
In: Note: Flags indicate national team as defined under FIFA eligibility rules; some limited exceptions apply. Players may hold more than one non-FIFA nationality.

No.	Pos.	Nation	Player
3	MF	NOR	Ardian Gashi (from (Sweden) Helsingborg)
19	FW	NOR	Snorre Krogsgård (from (Norway) Fram)

Out: Note: Flags indicate national team as defined under FIFA eligibility rules; some limited exceptions apply. Players may hold more than one non-FIFA nationality.

No.	Pos.	Nation	Player
3	DF	NOR	Fredrik Semb Berge (to (Denmark) Brøndby)
15	MF	KOS	Elbasan Rashani (to (Denmark) Brøndby)

== Competitions ==
=== Tippeligaen ===
==== Results summary ====
Overall								Home						Away					
Pld	W	D	L	GF	GA	GD	Pts	W	D	L	GF	GA	GD	W	D	L	GF	GA	GD
30	17	7	6	52	32	+20	58	10	3	2	30	14	+16	7	4	4	22	18	+4

==== Results by round ====
Round	1	2	3	4	5	6	7	8	9	10	11	12	13	14	15	16	17	18	19	20	21	22	23	24	25	26	27	28	29	30
Ground	A	H	A	H	A	H	A	H	A	H	A	H	A	H	A	H	A	H	H	A	H	A	H	A	H	A	H	A	H	A
Result	D	W	L	W	L	W	D	L	W	W	W	D	W	D	W	D	W	W	W	W	W	D	W	L	W	D	W	W	L	L
Position	11	5	11	6	9	6	8	9	8	5	3	4	3	3	3	3	3	2	2	2	2	2	2	2	2	2	2	2	2	3

Updated to match(es) played on 10 November 2014. Source: see below
A = Away; H = Home; W = Win; D = Draw; L = Loss

==== Results ====
30 March 2014 1	Sandnes Ulf	1–1	Odd	Sandnes
18:00 CEST (UTC+2)	Lennon 75'	Summary	Johnsen 85'	Stadium: Sandnes Idrettspark; Attendance: 3,506; Referee: Ola Hobber Nilsen

5 April 2014 2	Odd	2–1	Molde	Skien
15:30 CEST (UTC+2)	Rashani 50'; Samuelsen 53'	Summary	Hestad 41'	Stadium: Skagerak Arena; Attendance: 6,140; Referee: Trond Ivar Døvle

13 April 2014 3	Rosenborg	2–0	Odd	Trondheim
19:00 CEST (UTC+2)	Strangberg 4'; Bille Nielsen 90+4'			Stadium: Lerkendal Stadion; Attendance: 12 263; Referee: Svein Oddvar Moen

21 April 2014 4	Odd	2–1	Stabæk	Skien
19:00 CEST (UTC+2)	Fontanello 54' (o.g.); Rashani 68'	Summary	Boli 74'	Stadium: Skagerak Arena; Attendance: 6,591; Referee: Tommy Skjerven

27 April 2014 5	Strømsgodset	2–1	Odd	Drammen
15:30 CEST (UTC+2)	Kovács 10'; Sætra 20'	Summary	Samuelsen 43'	Stadium: Marienlyst Stadion; Attendance: 6,427; Referee: Per Staberg

1 May 2014 6	Odd	2–0	Sarpsborg 08	Skien
18:00 CEST (UTC+2)	Samuelsen 18'; Johnsen 86'	Summary		Stadium: Skagerak Arena; Attendance: 6,603; Referee: Tom Harald Hagen

5 May 2014 7	Viking	1–1	Odd	Stavanger
19:00 CEST (UTC+2)	Ingason 86'	Summary	Rashani 77'	Stadium: Viking Stadion; Attendance: 9,286; Referee: Ken Henry Johnsen

11 May 2014 8	Odd	0–2	Lillestrøm	Skien
15:30 CEST (UTC+2)		Summary	Ringstad 11'; Lundemo 40'	Stadium: Skagerak Arena; Attendance: 6,372; Referee: Omar Rafiq

16 May 2014 9	Haugesund	1–2	Odd	Haugesund
18:00 CEST (UTC+2)	Fevang 51'	Summary	Shala 40'; Storbæk 90'	Stadium: Haugesund Stadion; Attendance: 6,323; Referee: Tommy Skjerven

20 May 2014 10	Odd	2–1	Aalesund	Skien
18:00 CEST (UTC+2)	Samuelsen 18', 30'	Summary	Tollås 49'	Stadium: Skagerak Arena; Attendance: 5,652; Referee: Tore Hansen

25 May 2014 11	Start	0–1	Odd	Kristiansand
18:00 CEST (UTC+2)	Acosta (red card) 64'	Summary	Hagen 66'	Stadium: Sør Arena; Attendance: 5,210; Referee: Kristoffer Helgerud

9 June 2014 12	Odd	0–0	Sogndal	Skien
CEST (UTC+2)		Summary		Stadium: Skagerak Arena; Attendance: 6,398; Referee: Dag Vidar Hafsås

12 June 2014 13	Brann	0–1	Odd	Bergen
18:00 CEST (UTC+2)		Summary	Hurme 29'	Stadium: Brann Stadion; Attendance: 8,510; Referee: Omar Rafiq

7 July 2014 14	Odd	2–2	Vålerenga	Skien
19:00 CEST (UTC+2)	Hagen 14'; Gunnarsson 41' (o.g.)	Summary	Mathisen 27'; Larsen 79'	Stadium: Skagerak Arena; Attendance: 7,279; Referee: Svein Erik Edvartsen

12 July 2014 15	Bodø/Glimt	0–3	Odd	Bodø
18:00 CEST (UTC+2)		Summary	Samuelsen 69'; Rashani 72'; Halvorsen 78'	Stadium: Aspmyra Stadion; Attendance: 2,813; Referee: Trond Døvle

20 July 2014 16	Odd	0–0	Haugesund	Skien
18:00 CEST (UTC+2)		Summary		Stadium: Skagerak Arena; Attendance: 5,728; Referee: Tommy Skjerven

27 July 2014 17	Sogndal	1–3	Odd	Sogndalsfjøra
18:00 CEST (UTC+2)	Psyché 75'	Summary	Samuelsen 43'; Nordkvelle 84'; Storbæk 88'	Stadium: Fosshaugane Campus; Attendance: 2,845; Referee: Ola Hobber Nilsen

3 August 2014 18	Odd	3–1	Sandnes Ulf	Skien
15:30 CEST (UTC+2)	Johnsen 52'; Jensen 66'; Shala 90+1'	Summary	Midtsjø 47'	Stadium: Skagerak Arena; Attendance: 5,556; Referee: Espen Berntsen

9 August 2014 19	Odd	1–0	Strømsgodset	Skien
18:00 CEST (UTC+2)	Shala 79'	Summary		Stadium: Skagerak Arena; Attendance: 8,990; Referee: Trond Ivar Døvle

17 August 2014 20	Stabæk	1–3	Odd	Bærum
15:30 CEST (UTC+2)	Boli 28'	Summary	Shala 37'; Halvorsen 43'; Brustad 45+2' (o.g.); Nordkvelle (yellow card) 21' (yellow-red card) 49'	Stadium: Nadderud Stadion; Attendance: 4,080; Referee: Svein Oddvar Moen

24 August 2014 21	Odd	4–1	Start	Skien
15:30 CEST (UTC+2)	Bentley 57'; Storbæk 75'; Johnsen 87', 90'	Summary	Børufsen 12'	Stadium: Skagerak Arena; Attendance: 8,395; Referee: Ola Hobber Nilsen

30 August 2014 22	Sarpsborg 08	2–2	Odd	Sarpsborg
15:30 CEST (UTC+2)	K.Berge 16'; Castro 65'; T.Breive (yellow card) 35' (yellow-red card) 70'	Summary	Samuelsen 20'; Shala 79'	Stadium: Sarpsborg Stadion; Attendance: 3,582; Referee: Brage Sandmoen

13 September 2014 23	Odd	4–1	Viking	Skien
15:30 CEST (UTC+2)	Samuelsen 8'; Bentley 50'; Johnsen 52'; Shala 71'	Summary	Grøgaard 4' (o.g.)	Stadium: Skagerak Arena; Attendance: 8,399; Referee: Trond Ivar Døvle

21 September 2014 24	Lillestrøm	2–0	Odd	Lillestrøm
18:00 CEST (UTC+2)	Moen 30'; Ringstad 71'	Summary		Stadium: Åråsen Stadion; Attendance: 5837; Referee: Per Ivar Staberg

28 September 2014 25	Odd	4–0	Brann	Skien
18:00 CEST (UTC+2)	Karadas 31' (o.g.); Johnsen 66'; Shala 70' (pen.); Mojsov 89' (o.g.)	Summary		Stadium: Skagerak Arena; Attendance: 7,008; Referee: Espen Berntsen

4 October 2014 26	Aalesund	2–2	Odd	Ålesund
15:30 CEST (UTC+2)	Barrantes 40'; Latifu 90+1'	Summary	Johnsen 73', 82'	Stadium: Color Line Stadion; Attendance: 7,804; Referee: Martin Lundby

19 October 2014 27	Odd	4–3	Bodø/Glimt	Skien
18:00 CEST (UTC+2)	Bentley 21'; Shala 35'; Johnsen 58', 83'	Summary	Richards 13'; Badou 45+1', 62'	Stadium: Skagerak Arena; Attendance: 6,704; Referee: Tommy Skjerven

24 October 2014 28	Vålerenga	1–2	Odd	Oslo
19:00 CEST (UTC+2)	Zahid 79'	Summary	Shala 14'; Storbæk 32'	Stadium: Ullevaal Stadion; Attendance: 7,355; Referee: Tore Hansen

2 November 2014 29	Odd	0–1	Rosenborg	Skien
18:00 CET (UTC+1)	Eriksen (yellow card) 80'	Summary	Skjelvik 50'; Helland (yellow card) 71'; Jensen (yellow card) 83'; Eyjólfsson (yellow card) 90+1'	Stadium: Skagerak Arena; Attendance: 11,548; Referee: Svein Moen

9 November 2014 30	Molde	2–0	Odd	Molde
18:00 CET (UTC+1)	Hussain 70'; Gulbrandsen (yellow card) 73'; Chima 75' (yellow card) 78'; Høiland (yellow card) 80'	Summary	Hagen (yellow card) 59'; Jensen (yellow card) 73'	Stadium: Aker Stadion; Attendance: 9,500; Referee: Espen Berntsen

==== Table ====
Pos	Team	Pld	W	D	L	GF	GA	GD	Pts	Qualification or relegation
1	Molde (C)	30	22	5	3	62	24	+38	71	Qualification for the Champions League second qualifying round
2	Rosenborg	30	18	6	6	64	43	+21	60	Qualification for the Europa League first qualifying round (Note: Since the winners of the 2014 Norwegian Cup (Molde) qualified for European competition based on their league position, the berth (Europa League first qualifying round) was passed down the league to Strømsgodset.)
3	Odd	30	17	7	6	52	32	+20	58	Qualification for the Europa League first qualifying round
4	Strømsgodset	30	15	5	10	48	42	+6	50	Qualification for the Europa League first qualifying round
5	Lillestrøm	30	13	7	10	49	35	+14	46	

Source: fotball.no
Rules for classification: 1) points; 2) goal difference; 3) number of goals scored.
(C) Champions

=== Norwegian Cup ===
24 April 2014 First Round	Kjapp	0–4	Odd	Nordagutu
18:00 CEST (UTC+2)		Summary	Johansen 17', 83'; Helgerud 61' (o.g.); Halvorsen 71'	Stadium: Kjapp hovedbane Attendance: 850; Referee: Tim Nicolai Fjellvang

8 May 2014 Second Round	Fram Larvik	2–4 (a.e.t.)	Odd	Larvik
18:00 CEST (UTC+2)	Pietroń 71'; Adžić 104'	Summary	Shala 75'; Johnsen 97', 103'; Storbæk 100'	Stadium: Fram Stadion; Attendance: 994; Referee: Espen Larsen

4 June 2014 Third Round	Notodden	0–4	Odd	Notodden
18:00 CEST (UTC+2)		Summary	Bentley 5'; Nordkvelle 35'; Halvorsen 45', 48'	Stadium: Notodden Stadion; Attendance: 1,567; Referee: Ken Henry Johnsen

27 June 2014 Fourth Round	Odd	3–2	Vålerenga	Skien
19:00 CEST (UTC+2)	Johnsen 51', 58'; Bentley 90' (pen.)	Summary	Høgh 68'; Holm 78'	Stadium: Skagerak Arena; Attendance: 5,744; Referee: Per Ivar Staberg

14 August 2014 Quarterfinals	Odd	3–1	Brann	Skien
20:00 CEST (UTC+2)	Shala 66' (pen.), 87'; Johansen 78'	Summary	Huseklepp 24'	Stadium: Skagerak Arena; Attendance: 8,348; Referee: Dag Vidar Hafsås

25 September 2014 Semifinals	Odd	5–2	Sarpsborg 08	Skien
19:45 CEST (UTC+2)	Shala 48', 71'; Halvorsen 58', 90+3'; Johnsen 66'	Summary	Zajić 37'; Thomassen (yellow card) 45' (yellow-red card) 47'; Þórarinsson 77'	Stadium: Skagerak Arena; Referee: Svein Oddvar Moen

==== Final ====
23 November 2014	Molde	2–0	Odd	Oslo
13:15 CET (UTC+1)	Elyounoussi (yellow card) 60', (goal) 88'; Gulbrandsen (yellow card) 65', (goal) 73'	Summary	Hurme (yellow card) 58'; Samuelsen (yellow card) 69'	Stadium: Ullevaal Stadion; Attendance: 26,528; Referee: Dag Vidar Hafsås

== Squad statistics ==
As of match played 23 November 2014

=== Appearances and goals ===
No.	Pos	Nat	Player	Total		Tippeligaen		Norwegian Cup	
No.	Pos	Nat	Player	Apps	Goals	Apps	Goals	Apps	Goals
1	GK	(Norway) NOR	André Hansen	35	0	29	0	6	0
2	DF	(Norway) NOR	Emil Jonassen	5	0	2+1	0	2	0
3	MF	(Norway) NOR	Ardian Gashi	14	0	4+7	0	0+3	0
4	DF	(Norway) NOR	Vegard Bergan	9	0	4+1	0	3+1	0
5	DF	(Norway) NOR	Thomas Grøgaard	35	0	30	0	5	0
6	MF	(Norway) NOR	Christer Kleiven	2	0	0	0	2	0
7	FW	(Norway) NOR	Ole Jørgen Halvorsen	33	7	16+10	2	5+2	5
8	MF	(Norway) NOR	Jone Samuelsen	32	9	28	9	4	0
9	FW	(Norway) NOR	Henrik Kjelsrud Johansen	11	3	0+8	0	2+1	3
10	MF	(Albania) ALB	Herolind Shala	36	14	24+6	9	5+1	5
11	FW	(Norway) NOR	Frode Johnsen	36	16	28+2	11	5+1	5
12	GK	(Norway) NOR	Sondre Løvseth Rossbach	4	0	1+2	0	1	0
14	MF	(Norway) NOR	Fredrik Nordkvelle	33	2	13+13	1	6+1	1
18	DF	(Finland) FIN	Jarkko Hurme	19	1	11+2	1	5+1	0
19	FW	(Norway) NOR	Snorre Krogsgård	6	0	0+5	0	0+1	0
20	MF	(Norway) NOR	Fredrik Oldrup Jensen	33	1	27+2	1	3+1	0
21	DF	(Norway) NOR	Steffen Hagen	38	3	30	3	8	0
22	MF	(Norway) NOR	Håvard Storbæk	33	5	15+12	4	3+3	1
23	DF	(Norway) NOR	Lars Kristian Eriksen	29	0	25	0	4	0
25	MF	(Norway) NOR	Mathias Fredriksen	2	0	0	0	1+1	0
26	FW	(Nigeria) NGR	Bentley	36	5	18+11	3	5+2	2
Players away from Odd on loan:
Players who appeared for Odd no longer at the club:
3	DF	(Norway) NOR	Fredrik Semb Berge	12	0	11	0	1	0
15	MF	(Kosovo) KOS	Elbasan Rashani	17	4	14+1	4	1+1	0

=== Goal scorers ===
Place	Position	Nation	Number	Name	Tippeligaen	Norwegian Cup	Total
1	FW	(Norway)	11	Frode Johnsen	11	5	16
2	MF	(Albania)	10	Herolind Shala	9	5	14
3	MF	(Norway)	8	Jone Samuelsen	9	0	9
4	FW	(Norway)	7	Ole Jørgen Halvorsen	2	5	7
5	MF	(Norway)	22	Håvard Storbæk	4	1	5
5				Own goal	4	1	5
5	FW	(Nigeria)	26	Bentley	3	2	5
8	MF	(Kosovo)	15	Elbasan Rashani	4	0	4
9	DF	(Norway)	21	Steffen Hagen	3	0	3
9	FW	(Norway)	9	Henrik Kjelsrud Johansen	0	3	3
11	MF	(Norway)	14	Fredrik Nordkvelle	1	1	2
12	MF	(Norway)	20	Fredrik Oldrup Jensen	1	0	1
12	DF	(Finland)	18	Jarkko Hurme	1	0	1
				TOTALS	46	23	69

=== Disciplinary record ===
Number	Nation	Position	Name	Tippeligaen		Norwegian Cup		Total	
Number	Nation	Position	Name	Yellow card	Red card	Yellow card	Red card	Yellow card	Red card
1	(Norway)	GK	André Hansen	1	0	0	0	1	0
3	(Norway)	DF	Fredrik Semb Berge	2	0	0	0	2	0
4	(Norway)	DF	Vegard Bergan	0	0	1	0	1	0
5	(Norway)	DF	Thomas Grøgaard	0	0	1	0	1	0
7	(Norway)	FW	Ole Jørgen Halvorsen	1	0	0	0	1	0
8	(Norway)	MF	Jone Samuelsen	3	0	1	0	4	0
10	(Albania)	MF	Herolind Shala	2	0	0	0	2	0
14	(Norway)	MF	Fredrik Nordkvelle	2	1	1	0	3	1
15	(Kosovo)	MF	Elbasan Rashani	3	0	0	0	3	0
18	(Finland)	DF	Jarkko Hurme	1	0	2	0	3	0
20	(Norway)	MF	Fredrik Oldrup Jensen	4	0	0	0	4	0
21	(Norway)	DF	Steffen Hagen	1	0	0	0	1	0
22	(Norway)	MF	Håvard Storbæk	0	0	1	0	1	0
23	(Norway)	DF	Lars Kristian Eriksen	7	0	0	0	7	0
26	(Nigeria)	FW	Bentley	1	0	1	0	2	0
			TOTALS	28	1	8	0	36	1
