= 2013 Odds BK season =

Odd
2013 season
- Chairman: Tom Helge Rønning
- Manager: Dag-Eilev Fagermo
- Stadium: Skagerak Arena
- Tippeligaen: 7th
- Norwegian Cup: Fourth Round vs Bodø/Glimt
- Top goalscorer: League: Frode Johnsen (18); All: Frode Johnsen (16)
- Highest home attendance: 6,397 vs Start; 16 May 2013
- Lowest home attendance: 2,973 vs Sandefjord; 29 May 2013
- Average home league attendance: 5,153; 13 August 2013
Home colours	Away colours	Third colours

The 2013 season was Odd 5th consecutive year in Tippeligaen. It is Dag-Eilev Fagermo's sixth season as the club's manager. Odd also competed in the 2013 Norwegian Football Cup reaching the fourth round where they were knocked out by Bodø/Glimt.

== Squad ==
Note: Flags indicate national team as defined under FIFA eligibility rules; some limited exceptions apply. Players may hold more than one non-FIFA nationality.

No.	Pos.	Nation	Player
1	GK	NOR	André Hansen
2	DF	NOR	Emil Jonassen
3	DF	NOR	Fredrik Semb Berge
4	DF	NOR	Morten Fevang (Captain)
6	MF	NOR	Christer Kleiven
7	FW	NOR	Ole Jørgen Halvorsen
8	MF	NOR	Jone Samuelsen
9	FW	SWE	Mattias Andersson
10	MF	NOR	Herolind Shala
11	FW	NOR	Frode Johnsen
13	GK	NOR	Sondre Løvseth Rossbach
15	FW	NOR	Elbasan Rashani
17	DF	NOR	Niklas Gunnarsson

No.	Pos.	Nation	Player
18	MF	NOR	Fredrik Nordkvelle
19	FW	NOR	Snorre Krogsgård
20	MF	NOR	Fredrik Oldrup Jensen
21	DF	NOR	Steffen Hagen
22	MF	NOR	Håvard Storbæk
23	DF	NOR	Lars Kristian Eriksen
24	GK	NOR	Viljar Myhra
25	MF	NOR	Mathias Fredriksen
26	DF	NOR	Thomas Grøgaard
27	FW	NOR	Erik Rosland
28	FW	ANG	Eriel Antonio Pires
29	DF	NOR	Vegard Bergan
30	MF	NOR	Tony Hieu Vo

=== On Loan ===
Note: Flags indicate national team as defined under FIFA eligibility rules; some limited exceptions apply. Players may hold more than one non-FIFA nationality.

No. / Pos. / Nation / Player; 5 / DF / GHA / Paul Addo (at Strømmen)	No. / Pos. / Nation / Player; 14 / FW / NGR / George White (at Strømmen)

== Transfers ==
=== Winter ===
In: Note: Flags indicate national team as defined under FIFA eligibility rules; some limited exceptions apply. Players may hold more than one non-FIFA nationality.

No.	Pos.	Nation	Player
6	MF	NOR	Christer Kleiven (from (Norway) Stabæk)
22	MF	NOR	Håvard Storbæk (from (Norway) Haugesund)

Out: Note: Flags indicate national team as defined under FIFA eligibility rules; some limited exceptions apply. Players may hold more than one non-FIFA nationality.

No.	Pos.	Nation	Player
5	DF	GHA	Paul Addo (loan to (Norway) Strømmen)
6	MF	NOR	Simen Brenne (to (Norway) Strømsgodset)
13	GK	NOR	Andreas Lie (to (Norway) Aalesund)
16	MF	NOR	Alexandar Corovic
28	FW	NOR	Dag Alexander Olsen

=== Summer ===
In: Note: Flags indicate national team as defined under FIFA eligibility rules; some limited exceptions apply. Players may hold more than one non-FIFA nationality.

No.	Pos.	Nation	Player
7	FW	NOR	Ole Jørgen Halvorsen (from (Norway) Fredrikstad)
18	MF	NOR	Fredrik Nordkvelle (from (Norway) Brann)

Out: Note: Flags indicate national team as defined under FIFA eligibility rules; some limited exceptions apply. Players may hold more than one non-FIFA nationality.

No.	Pos.	Nation	Player
7	FW	NOR	Adem Güven (to (Turkey) Mersin İdmanyurdu)
14	FW	NGR	George White (loan to (Norway) Strømmen)

== Competitions ==
=== Tippeligaen ===
==== Results summary ====
Overall								Home						Away					
Pld	W	D	L	GF	GA	GD	Pts	W	D	L	GF	GA	GD	W	D	L	GF	GA	GD
30	11	7	12	43	39	+4	40	7	5	3	28	15	+13	4	2	9	15	24	−9

==== Results by round ====
Round	1	2	3	4	5	6	7	8	9	10	11	12	13	14	15	16	17	18	19	20	21	22	23	24	25	26	27	28	29	30
Ground	H	A	H	A	H	A	H	H	A	H	A	H	A	H	A	A	H	A	H	A	H	A	A	H	A	H	A	H	A	H
Result	L	L	W	L	D	L	W	D	L	L	L	W	D	W	W	L	W	W	D	D	L	L	L	W	W	D	W	D	L	W
Position	13	14	11	13	13	15	14	14	15	15	15	14	14	12	9	11	8	8	7	8	9	11	12	10	8	8	7	7	7	7

Updated to match(es) played on 19 November 2013. Source: see below
A = Away; H = Home; W = Win; D = Draw; L = Loss

==== Results ====
17 March 2013 1	Odd	0–1	Rosenborg	Skien
18:00 CET (UTC+1)		Summary	Jensen 71'	Stadium: Skagerak Arena; Attendance: 4,601; Referee: Tom Harald Hagen

1 April 2013 2	Tromsø	2–1	Odd	Tromsø
15:30 CEST (UTC+2)	Ondrášek 6'; Andersen 15'	Summary	Shala 77' (pen.)	Stadium: Alfheim Stadion; Attendance: 3,325; Referee: Ola Hobber Nilsen

5 April 2013 3	Odd	2–0	Vålerenga	Skien
19:00 CEST (UTC+2)	Johnsen 13'; Güven 20'	Summary		Stadium: Skagerak Arena; Attendance: 5,044; Referee: Tommy Skjerven

14 April 2013 4	Viking	1–0	Odd	Stavanger
18:00 CEST (UTC+2)	Berisha 23'	Summary		Stadium: Viking Stadion; Attendance: 8,525; Referee: Tore Hansen

20 April 2013 5	Odd	1–1	Molde	Skien
15:30 CEST (UTC+2)	Storbæk 34'	Summary	Hestad 38'	Stadium: Skagerak Arena; Attendance: 5,267; Referee: Ken Henry Johnsen

26 April 2013 6	Brann	2–0	Odd	Bergen
19:00 CEST (UTC+2)	Huseklepp 45', 52'	Summary		Stadium: Brann Stadion; Attendance: 10,212; Referee: Trygve Kjensli

5 May 2013 7	Odd	2–1	Lillestrøm	Skien
15:30 CEST (UTC+2)	Johnsen 36'; Shala 74'	Summary	Moen 13'	Stadium: Skagerak Arena; Attendance: 4,466; Referee: Svein Oddvar Moen

9 May 2013 8	Odd	1–1	Strømsgodset	Skien
18:00 CEST (UTC+2)	Shala 44'	Summary	Diomande 71'	Stadium: Skagerak Arena; Attendance: 5,131; Referee: Per Ivar Staberg

12 May 2013 9	Sogndal	2–0	Odd	Sogndalsfjøra
18:00 CEST (UTC+2)	Mane 43'; Skaasheim 80'	Summary		Stadium: Fosshaugane Campus; Attendance: 2,806; Referee: Svein Erik Edvartsen

16 May 2013 10	Odd	0–1	Start	Skien
20:05 CEST (UTC+2)		Summary	Vikstøl 60'	Stadium: Skagerak Arena; Attendance: 6,397; Referee: Tommy Skjerven

20 May 2013 11	Aalesund	2–0	Odd	Ålesund
18:00 CEST (UTC+2)	Ulvestad 40' (pen.); Hamdallah 54'	Summary		Stadium: Color Line Stadion; Attendance: 7,591; Referee: Brage Sandmoen

26 May 2013 12	Odd	3–0	Sandnes Ulf	Skien
18:00 CEST (UTC+2)	Fevang 23'; Storbæk 56'; Gunnarsson 65'	Summary	Mihajlov (red card) 22'	Stadium: Skagerak Arena; Attendance: 4,515; Referee: Trygve Kjensli

23 June 2013 13	Hønefoss	1–1	Odd	Hønefoss
18:00 CEST (UTC+2)	Mathisen 48'	Summary	Shala 63' (pen.)	Stadium: Aka Arena; Attendance: 2,564; Referee: Ken Henry Johnsen

30 June 2013 14	Odd	4–0	Haugesund	Skien
18:00 CEST (UTC+2)	Storbæk 46'; Shala 59'; Johnsen 88'; White 90+4'	Summary	Anyora (red card) 57'	Stadium: Skagerak Arena; Attendance: 5,197; Referee: Dag Vidar Hafsås

7 July 2013 15	Sarpsborg 08	0–1	Odd	Sarpsborg
18:00 CEST (UTC+2)		Summary	Johnsen 51'	Stadium: Sarpsborg Stadion; Attendance: 3,760; Referee: Omar Rafiq

14 July 2013 16	Rosenborg	3–2	Odd	Trondheim
19:00 CET (UTC+1)	Chibuike 39'; Dočkal 45'; Berntsen 62'	Summary	Johnsen 64'; Shala 90+1' (pen.); Samuelsen (yellow card) 86' (yellow-red card) 90+3'	Stadium: Lerkendal Stadion; Attendance: 11,748; Referee: Ken Henry Johnsen

28 July 2013 17	Odd	3–1	Tromsø	Skien
18:00 CEST (UTC+2)	Berge 10'; Johnsen 28'; Güven 67'	Summary	Bendiksen 81' (pen.)	Stadium: Skagerak Arena; Attendance: 4,619; Referee: Tore Hansen

3 August 2013 18	Start	0–1	Odd	Kristiansand
15:30 CEST (UTC+2)		Summary	Jensen 35'	Stadium: Sør Arena; Attendance: 4,855; Referee: Omar Rafiq

11 August 2013 19	Odd	1–1	Viking	Skien
18:00 CEST (UTC+2)	Berge 90+3'	Summary	Sulimani 62'	Stadium: Skagerak Arena; Attendance: 5,068; Referee: Ola Hobber Nilsen

17 August 2013 20	Molde	1–1	Odd	Molde
15:30 CEST (UTC+2)	Berget 54'	Summary	Johnsen 42'	Stadium: Aker Stadion; Attendance: 8,349; Referee: Kristoffer Helgerud

24 August 2013 21	Odd	1–3	Brann	Skien
18:00 CEST (UTC+2)	Johnsen 5'	Summary	Pusic 27', 90+2'; Barmen 83'	Stadium: Skagerak Arena; Attendance: 6,186; Referee: Svein Oddvar Moen

31 August 2013 22	Lillestrøm	1–0	Odd	Lillestrøm
15:30 CEST (UTC+2)	Kippe (red card) 31'; Ødegaard 41'	Summary		Stadium: Åråsen Stadion; Attendance: 4,069; Referee: Brage Sandmoen

15 September 2013 23	Strømsgodset	3–1	Odd	Drammen
15:30 CEST (UTC+2)	Ibrahim 10'; Adjei-Boateng 77'; Diomande 86'	Summary	Johnsen 62'; Eriksen (yellow card) 70' (yellow-red card) 76'	Stadium: Marienlyst Stadion; Attendance: 6,204; Referee: Tore Hansen

22 September 2013 24	Odd	5–1	Aalesund	Skien
18:00 CEST (UTC+2)	Storbæk 30'; Johnsen 34', 57', 86'; Rashani 41'	Summary	James 26'	Stadium: Skagerak Arena; Attendance: 5,564; Referee: Tom Harald Hagen

29 September 2013 25	Vålerenga	1–2	Odd	Oslo
18:00 CEST (UTC+2)	Zajić 90'	Summary	Rashani 66'; Krogsgård 90+2'	Stadium: Ullevaal Stadion; Attendance: 7,798; Referee: Kristoffer Helgerud

6 October 2013 26	Odd	0–0	Sogndal	Skien
18:00 CEST (UTC+2)		Summary		Stadium: Skagerak Arena; Attendance: 5,843; Referee: Omar Rafiq

20 October 2013 27	Sandnes Ulf	2–4	Odd	Sandnes
18:00 CEST (UTC+2)	Helle 35'; Torsteinbø 57'	Summary	Johnsen 38', 67'; Gunnarsson 88'; Samuelsen 90+2'	Stadium: Sandnes Idrettspark; Attendance: 3,100; Referee: Trond Ivar Døvle

27 October 2013 28	Odd	2–2	Sarpsborg 08	Skien
18:00 CEST (UTC+2)	Johnsen 14'; Storbæk 70'; Gunnarsson (yellow card) 38' (yellow-red card) 77'	Summary	Olanare 44'; Kronberg 74'	Stadium: Skagerak Arena; Attendance: 6,382; Referee: Ola Hobber Nilsen

3 November 2013 29	Haugesund	3–1	Odd	Haugesund
18:00 CEST (UTC+2)	Jonassen 34' (o.g.); Bamberg 37'; Haraldseid 90+3'	Summary	Shala 30'	Stadium: Haugesund Stadion; Attendance: 7,889; Referee: Dag Vidar Hafsås

10 November 2013 30	Odd	3–2	Hønefoss	Skien
18:00 CET (UTC+1)	Clark 33' (o.g.); Shala 74'; Johnsen 81'	Summary	Hovda 8'; Mathisen 56'	Stadium: Skagerak Arena; Attendance: 5,190; Referee: Brage Sandmoen

==== Table ====
Pos	Team	Pld	W	D	L	GF	GA	GD	Pts	Qualification or relegation
5	Viking	30	12	10	8	41	36	+5	46	
6	Molde	30	12	8	10	47	38	+9	44	Qualification for the Europa League second qualifying round (Note: Molde qualified for the second qualifying round of the UEFA Europa League as winners of the 2013 Norwegian Cup.)
7	Odd	30	11	7	12	43	39	+4	40	
8	Brann	30	11	6	13	46	46	0	39	
9	Start	30	10	8	12	43	46	−3	38	

Source: fotball.no
Rules for classification: 1) points; 2) goal difference; 3) number of goals scored.

=== Norwegian Cup ===
17 April 2013 First Round	HFIF	0–5	Odd	Tønsberg
18:00 CEST (UTC+2)		Summary	Rashani 22'; Kleiven 40'; Krogsgård 41'; Johnsen 62'; Fredriksen 79'	Stadium: Husøy Arena; Attendance: 686; Referee: Rohit Saggi

1 May 2013 Second Round	Pors Grenland	1–2 (a.e.t.)	Odd	Porsgrunn
18:00 CEST (UTC+2)	Enger 48'	Report	Storbæk 66'; Eriksen (red card) 114'; Fevang 120'	Stadium: Pors Stadion; Attendance: 2,393; Referee: Raymond Nyberg

29 May 2013 Third Round	Odd	2–0	Sandefjord	Skien
18:00 CEST (UTC+2)	Johnsen 17'; Krogsgård 68'	Summary		Stadium: Skagerak Arena; Attendance: 2,973; Referee: Ola Hobber Nilsen

19 June 2013 Fourth Round	Bodø/Glimt	2–1	Odd	Bodø
18:00 CEST (UTC+2)	Johansen 75'; Laajab 79'	Report	Rashani 56'	Stadium: Aspmyra Stadion; Attendance: 2,379; Referee: Tom Harald Hagen

== Squad statistics ==
As of 19 November 2013

=== Appearances and goals ===
No.	Pos	Nat	Player	Total		Tippeligaen		Norwegian Cup	
No.	Pos	Nat	Player	Apps	Goals	Apps	Goals	Apps	Goals
1	GK	(Norway) NOR	André Hansen	26	0	23+0	0	3+0	0
2	DF	(Norway) NOR	Emil Jonassen	25	0	22+0	0	3+0	0
3	DF	(Norway) NOR	Fredrik Semb Berge	26	2	23+0	2	3+0	0
4	DF	(Norway) NOR	Morten Fevang	25	2	10+11	1	4+0	1
6	MF	(Norway) NOR	Christer Kleiven	19	1	4+12	0	2+1	1
7	FW	(Norway) NOR	Ole Jørgen Halvorsen	12	0	11+1	0	0+0	0
8	MF	(Norway) NOR	Jone Samuelsen	29	1	27+0	1	2+0	0
9	FW	(Sweden) SWE	Mattias Andersson	4	0	2+2	0	0+0	0
10	MF	(Norway) NOR	Herolind Shala	33	8	22+8	8	3+0	0
11	FW	(Norway) NOR	Frode Johnsen	34	18	30+0	16	4+0	2
13	GK	(Norway) NOR	Sondre Løvseth Rossbach	8	0	7+0	0	1+0	0
15	FW	(Norway) NOR	Elbasan Rashani	25	4	16+5	2	3+1	2
17	DF	(Norway) NOR	Niklas Gunnarsson	30	2	23+3	2	4+0	0
18	MF	(Norway) NOR	Fredrik Nordkvelle	2	0	2+0	0	0+0	0
19	FW	(Norway) NOR	Snorre Krogsgård	19	3	2+13	1	2+2	2
20	MF	(Norway) NOR	Fredrik Oldrup Jensen	30	1	27+2	1	0+1	0
21	DF	(Norway) NOR	Steffen Hagen	27	0	24+0	0	2+1	0
22	MF	(Norway) NOR	Håvard Storbæk	31	6	23+5	5	3+0	1
23	DF	(Norway) NOR	Lars Kristian Eriksen	14	0	10+2	0	1+1	0
25	MF	(Norway) NOR	Mathias Fredriksen	9	1	0+7	0	0+2	1
26	DF	(Norway) NOR	Thomas Grøgaard	10	0	9+1	0	0+0	0
29	DF	(Norway) NOR	Vegard Bergan	1	0	0+1	0	0+0	0
Players away from Odd on loan:
14	FW	(Nigeria) NGR	George White	9	1	0+7	1	2+0	0
Players who appeared for Odd no longer at the club:
7	FW	(Norway) NOR	Adem Güven	24	2	15+5	2	2+2	0

=== Goal scorers ===
Place	Position	Nation	Number	Name	Tippeligaen	Norwegian Cup	Total
1	FW	(Norway)	11	Frode Johnsen	16	2	18
2	MF	(Norway)	10	Herolind Shala	8	0	8
3	MF	(Norway)	22	Håvard Storbæk	5	1	6
4	FW	(Norway)	15	Elbasan Rashani	2	2	4
5	MF	(Norway)	7	Adem Güven	2	0	2
5	DF	(Norway)	3	Fredrik Semb Berge	2	0	2
5	DF	(Norway)	17	Niklas Gunnarsson	2	0	2
5	DF	(Norway)	4	Morten Fevang	1	1	2
5	FW	(Norway)	19	Snorre Krogsgård	0	2	2
10	FW	(Nigeria)	14	George White	1	0	1
10	MF	(Norway)	8	Jone Samuelsen	1	0	1
10	MF	(Norway)	20	Fredrik Oldrup Jensen	1	0	1
10	FW	(Norway)	19	Snorre Krogsgård	1	0	1
10	DF	(Norway)	4	Morten Fevang	1	0	1
10	MF	(Norway)	6	Christer Kleiven	0	1	1
10	MF	(Norway)	25	Mathias Fredriksen	0	1	1
				TOTALS	43	10	53

=== Disciplinary record ===
Number	Nation	Position	Name	Tippeligaen		Norwegian Cup		Total	
Number	Nation	Position	Name	Yellow card	Red card	Yellow card	Red card	Yellow card	Red card
2	(Norway)	DF	Emil Jonassen	2	0	0	0	2	0
3	(Norway)	DF	Fredrik Semb Berge	3	0	0	0	3	0
4	(Norway)	DF	Morten Fevang	1	0	0	0	1	0
6	(Norway)	MF	Christer Kleiven	1	0	0	0	1	0
7	(Norway)	FW	Adem Güven	1	0	0	0	1	0
7	(Norway)	FW	Ole Jørgen Halvorsen	1	0	0	0	1	0
8	(Norway)	MF	Jone Samuelsen	7	1	0	0	7	1
10	(Nigeria)	MF	Herolind Shala	0	0	1	0	1	0
14	(Nigeria)	FW	George White	1	0	1	0	2	0
15	(Norway)	FW	Elbasan Rashani	6	0	1	0	7	0
17	(Norway)	DF	Niklas Gunnarsson	4	1	1	0	5	1
18	(Norway)	MF	Fredrik Nordkvelle	1	0	0	0	1	0
19	(Norway)	FW	Snorre Krogsgård	0	0	1	0	1	0
20	(Norway)	MF	Fredrik Oldrup Jensen	1	0	0	0	1	0
22	(Norway)	MF	Håvard Storbæk	2	0	0	0	2	0
23	(Norway)	DF	Lars Kristian Eriksen	4	1	0	1	4	2
			TOTALS	35	3	5	1	40	4
