= 2015 Odds BK season =

Odd
2015 season
- Chairman: Tom Helge Rønning
- Manager: Dag-Eilev Fagermo
- Stadium: Skagerak Arena
- Tippeligaen: 4th
- Norwegian Cup: Quarterfinal vs Sarpsborg 08
- Europa League: Playoff round vs Borussia Dortmund
- Top goalscorer: League: Olivier Occéan (15); All: Olivier Occéan (20)
Home colours	Away colours	Third colours

Odds Ballklubb, commonly known as Odd, is a Norwegian football club from Skien. Originally the football section of a multi-sports club, founded in 1894 nine years after the club's founding. All other sports than football were discontinued and the club became dedicated to football only. Odd plays in the Norwegian top division, Tippeligaen, and holds the record winning the Norwegian Football Cup the most times, the last coming in 2000. The club was known as Odd Grenland between 1994 and 2012. During the 2015 season the club will be participating in the Tippeliean, NM Cupen and UEFA Europa League.

== Squad ==
Note: Flags indicate national team as defined under FIFA eligibility rules; some limited exceptions apply. Players may hold more than one non-FIFA nationality.

No.	Pos.	Nation	Player
1	GK	NOR	Sondre Rossbach
2	DF	NOR	Espen Ruud
3	MF	NOR	Ardian Gashi
4	DF	NOR	Vegard Bergan
5	DF	NOR	Thomas Grøgaard
6	MF	NOR	Oliver Berg
7	FW	NOR	Ole Jørgen Halvorsen
8	MF	NOR	Jone Samuelsen
9	FW	SEN	Pape Paté Diouf (loan from Molde)
10	FW	CAN	Olivier Occéan
11	FW	NOR	Frode Johnsen
12	FW	NOR	Ulrik Flo
14	MF	NOR	Fredrik Nordkvelle

No.	Pos.	Nation	Player
15	MF	NOR	Rafik Zekhnini
16	MF	NOR	Jonathan Lindseth
17	MF	NOR	Eric Kitolano
18	DF	FIN	Jarkko Hurme
19	DF	NOR	Emil Jonassen
20	MF	NOR	Fredrik Oldrup Jensen
21	DF	NOR	Steffen Hagen (Captain)
22	MF	NOR	Håvard Storbæk
23	DF	NOR	Lars Kristian Eriksen
24	GK	NOR	Viljar Myhra
25	MF	NOR	Mathias Fredriksen
26	FW	NGR	Bentley

== Transfers ==
=== Winter ===
In: Note: Flags indicate national team as defined under FIFA eligibility rules; some limited exceptions apply. Players may hold more than one non-FIFA nationality.

No.	Pos.	Nation	Player
2	DF	NOR	Espen Ruud (from (Denmark) OB)
6	MF	NOR	Oliver Berg (from (Norway) Raufoss)
10	FW	CAN	Olivier Occéan (loan from (Germany) Eintracht Frankfurt)

Out: Note: Flags indicate national team as defined under FIFA eligibility rules; some limited exceptions apply. Players may hold more than one non-FIFA nationality.

No.	Pos.	Nation	Player
1	GK	NOR	André Hansen (to (Norway) Rosenborg)
6	MF	NOR	Christer Kleiven (to (Norway) Vigør)
9	FW	NOR	Henrik Kjelsrud Johansen (loan to (Norway) Fredrikstad)
10	MF	ALB	Herolind Shala (to (Czech Republic) Sparta Prague)
19	FW	NOR	Snorre Krogsgård (to (Sweden) Halmstad)

=== Summer ===
In: Note: Flags indicate national team as defined under FIFA eligibility rules; some limited exceptions apply. Players may hold more than one non-FIFA nationality.

No.	Pos.	Nation	Player
9	FW	SEN	Pape Paté Diouf (loan from (Norway) Molde)
10	FW	CAN	Olivier Occéan (from (Germany) Eintracht Frankfurt, previously on loan)
12	FW	NOR	Ulrik Flo (from (Norway) Sogndal)

Out: Note: Flags indicate national team as defined under FIFA eligibility rules; some limited exceptions apply. Players may hold more than one non-FIFA nationality.

No.	Pos.	Nation	Player

== Competitions ==
=== Tippeligaen ===
==== Results summary ====
Overall								Home						Away					
Pld	W	D	L	GF	GA	GD	Pts	W	D	L	GF	GA	GD	W	D	L	GF	GA	GD
30	15	10	5	61	41	+20	55	7	6	2	30	19	+11	8	4	3	31	22	+9

==== Results by round ====
Round	1	2	3	4	5	6	7	8	9	10	11	12	13	14	15	16	17	18	19	20	21	22	23	24	25	26	27	28	29	30
Ground	A	H	A	H	A	H	A	H	H	A	H	A	H	A	H	A	H	A	H	A	H	A	H	A	H	A	A	H	A	H
Result	W	W	W	D	L	L	D	W	D	D	D	W	D	D	L	L	W	W	D	W	W	W	W	W	D	W	L	W	D	W
Position	4	3	1	2	4	5	5	3	5	6	6	5	5	6	7	7	7	6	6	5	5	4	4	4	4	4	4	4	4	4

Updated to match(es) played on 8 November 2015. Source: see below
A = Away; H = Home; W = Win; D = Draw; L = Loss

==== Results ====
7 April 2015 1	Molde	1–2	Odd	Molde
19:00 CEST (UTC+2)	Elyounoussi 89'	Summary	Johnsen 54'; Ruud (yellow card) 63'; Halvorsen 90'	Stadium: Aker Stadion; Attendance: 8,308; Referee: Tom Harald Hagen

12 April 2015 2	Odd	2–0	Stabæk	Skien
18:00 CEST (UTC+2)	Gashi (yellow card) 51'; Ruud 61' (pen.); Næss 75' (o.g.)	Summary	Gorozia (red card) 62'	Stadium: Skagerak Arena; Attendance: 8,123; Referee: Trond Ivar Døvle

19 April 2015 3	Bodø/Glimt	2–4	Odd	Bodø
15:30 CEST (UTC+2)	Olsen 35', (yellow card) 42'; Badou 41'; Sané (yellow card) 80'	Summary	Johnsen 10'; Hagen 38'; Nordkvelle 71'; Halvorsen 82'	Stadium: Aspmyra Stadion; Attendance: 2,461; Referee: Trygve Kjensli

25 April 2015 4	Odd	2–2	Mjøndalen	Skien
15:30 CEST (UTC+2)	Ruud 30', 40'	Summary	Sundli (yellow card) 27'; Midtgarden (yellow card) 29'; Aasmundsen 59'; Kapidzic (yellow card) 80', (goal) 90+4'	Stadium: Skagerak Arena; Attendance: 7,847; Referee: Tore Hansen

29 April 2015 5	Sarpsborg 08	2–0	Odd	Sarpsborg
19:00 CEST (UTC+2)	Ernemann (yellow card) 3'; Jensen 20'; Askar 34', (yellow card) 90+5'	Summary	Ruud (yellow card) 15'; Samuelsen (yellow card) 51'	Stadium: Sarpsborg Stadion; Attendance: 3,151; Referee: Ola Hobber Nilsen

3 May 2015 6	Odd	1–2	Rosenborg	Skien
20:00 CEST (UTC+2)	Bentley 27'; Ruud (penalty missed)	Summary	Helland 10'; Riski 82' (pen.); Eyjólfsson (yellow card) 89'	Stadium: Skagerak Arena; Attendance: 9,073; Referee: Svein Oddvar Moen

10 May 2015 7	Viking	1–1	Odd	Stavanger
18:00 CEST (UTC+2)	de Lanlay 53'; Abdullahi (yellow card) 90'	Summary	Occéan 15'; Hagen (yellow card) 20'; Oldrup Jensen (yellow card) 68'	Stadium: Viking Stadion; Attendance: 12,473; Referee: Svein-Erik Edvartsen

13 May 2015 8	Odd	2–0	Strømsgodset	Skien
18:00 CEST (UTC+2)	Samuelsen 42'; Bentley 61'	Summary	Nana (yellow card) 71'	Stadium: Skagerak Arena; Attendance: 8 101; Referee: Tore Hansen

16 May 2015 9	Odd	0–0	Haugesund	Skien
18:00 CEST (UTC+2)		Summary	Skjerve (yellow card) 17'; Myrestam (yellow card) 31'; Olsen (yellow card) 41'; Riski (yellow card) 67'	Stadium: Skagerak Arena; Attendance: 9,054; Referee: Tore Hansen

25 May 2015 10	Tromsø	2–2	Odd	Tromsø
15:30 CEST (UTC+2)	R.Johansen 3' (yellow card) 56'; Andersen 41'; Ondrášek (yellow card) 49'	Summary	Bentley 7'; Grøgaard (yellow card) 9'; Ruud (yellow card) 50'; Heigre 58' (o.g.); Occéan (yellow card) 68'	Stadium: Alfheim Stadion; Attendance: 3,518; Referee: Tom Harald Hagen

29 May 2015 11	Odd	1–1	Aalesund	Skien
19:00 CEST (UTC+2)	Occéan 19', (yellow card) 76'; Samuelsen (yellow card) 90+2'	Summary	Björk 78'; Mäntylä (yellow card) 90'	Stadium: Skagerak Arena; Attendance: 6,769; Referee: Trond Ivar Døvle

6 June 2015 12	Sandefjord	0–1	Odd	Sandefjord
18:00 CEST (UTC+2)	Torp (yellow card) 23'; Amankwah (yellow card) 69'	Summary	Occéan 53'	Stadium: Komplett.no Arena; Attendance: 3,903; Referee: Dag Vidar Hafsås

19 June 2015 13	Odd	3–3	Start	Skien
19:00 CEST (UTC+2)	Occéan 33' (pen.); Eriksen 35'; Samuelsen 42'; Hagen (yellow card) 89'; Ruud (yellow card) 90'	Summary	Børufsen 39'; Ajer (yellow card) 40'; Hoff (yellow card) 53'; Vilhjálmsson 73'; Hollingen (yellow card) 76'; Salvesen 89' (pen.)	Stadium: Skagerak Arena; Attendance: 7,318; Referee: Trygve Kjensli

28 June 2015 14	Lillestrøm	1–1	Odd	Lillestrøm
18:00 CEST (UTC+2)	Kippe (yellow card) 25'; Fofana 52' (pen.); Margeirsson (yellow card) 85'; Innocent (yellow card) 90'	Summary	Occéan 36'	Stadium: Åråsen Stadion; Attendance: 4,696; Referee: Trygve Kjensli

5 July 2015 15	Odd	1–2	Vålerenga	Skien
18:00 CEST (UTC+2)	Occéan 54'	Summary	Ómarsson 22', 85'; Mathisen (yellow card) 54'	Stadium: Skagerak Arena; Attendance: 8,161; Referee: Tom Harald Hagen

12 July 2015 16	Rosenborg	3–0	Odd	Trondheim
18:00 CEST (UTC+2)	Selnæs 41'; Helland 50'; Eyjólfsson (yellow card) 56'; Søderlund 71'; Riski (yellow card) 72'	Summary	Nordkvelle (yellow card) 1'; Jensen (yellow card) 74'	Stadium: Lerkendal Stadion; Attendance: 15,773; Referee: Ola Hobber Nilsen

26 July 2015 17	Odd	3–2	Tromsø	Skien
18:00 CEST (UTC+2)	Nordkvelle 23'; Occéan 44'; Zekhnini 90+2'	Summary	Andersen 31'; Moldskred 83'	Stadium: Skagerak Arena; Attendance: 6,888; Referee: Martin Lundby

2 August 2015 18	Mjøndalen	3–6	Odd	Mjøndalen
15:30 CEST (UTC+2)	Gundersen (yellow card) 31'; Midtgarden 42'; Gauseth (yellow card) 52'; Kapidžić 57', 88'	Summary	Jensen 16'; Arneberg 23' (o.g.); Occéan 25'; Bentley 68'; Halvorsen 70', 90'	Stadium: Isachsen Stadion; Attendance: 2,236; Referee: Tore Hansen

9 August 2015 19	Odd	2–2	Molde	Skien
20:00 CEST (UTC+2)	Bentley 57'; Occéan 74' (pen.)	Summary	Elyounoussi 14'; Toivio 36'; Linde (red card) 71'	Stadium: Skagerak Arena; Attendance: 7,993; Referee: Tom Harald Hagen

16 August 2015 20	Start	0–4	Odd	Kristiansand
15:30 CEST (UTC+2)	Christensen (yellow card) 61'	Summary	Zekhnini 2'; Bentley 12'; Occéan 34' (pen.); Storbæk (yellow card) 80'; Halvorsen 85'	Stadium: Sør Arena; Attendance: 5,207; Referee: Martin Lundby

23 August 2015 21	Odd	1–0	Viking	Skien
15:30 CEST (UTC+2)	Nordkvelle 32'	Summary	Þorsteinsson (yellow card) 33'; Sigurðsson (yellow card) 90+4'	Stadium: Skagerak Arena; Attendance: 8,447; Referee: Svein Erik Edvartsen

30 August 2015 22	Stabæk	1–2	Odd	Bærum
15:30 CEST (UTC+2)	Keita (yellow card) 58'; Kassi 84'	Summary	Bentley 10'; Occéan 34' (pen.); Gashi (yellow card) 53' (yellow-red card) 65'	Stadium: Nadderud Stadion; Attendance: 4,523; Referee: Kim Andre Johnsen

13 September 2015 23	Odd	2–1	Bodø/Glimt	Skien
18:00 CEST (UTC+2)	Occéan 53' (pen.) (yellow card) 70'; Nordkvelle 78'	Summary	Sané (yellow card) 53'; Valentin (yellow card) 69'; Chatto (yellow card) 71'; Tønne 86'	Stadium: Skagerak Arena; Attendance: 7,092; Referee: Ola Hobber Nilsen

20 September 2015 24	Aalesund	1–3	Odd	Ålesund
15:30 CEST (UTC+2)	James 23'	Summary	Diouf 34', 54'; Samuelsen (yellow card) 78'; Jensen 81' (yellow card) 90+2'	Stadium: Color Line Stadion; Attendance: 6,140; Referee: Trygve Kjensli

27 September 2015 25	Odd	1–1	Sarpsborg 08	Skien
15:30 CEST (UTC+2)	Diouf 13'; Gashi (yellow card) 21'	Summary	Ernemann (yellow card) 83'; Kachi 90+1' (yellow card) 90+2'	Stadium: Skagerak Arena; Attendance: 7,599; Referee: Omar Rafiq

4 October 2015 26	Haugesund	1–2	Odd	Haugesund
15:30 CEST (UTC+2)	Kiss (yellow card) 47'; Diedhiou 69'	Summary	Nordkvelle 33'; Ruud (yellow card) 59'; Occéan 88'	Stadium: Haugesund Stadion; Attendance: 4,855; Referee: Tommy Skjerven

16 October 2015 27	Strømsgodset	2–1	Odd	Drammen
19:00 CEST (UTC+2)	Horn (yellow card) 24'; Pedersen 33' (yellow card) 57'; Fossum 40'	Summary	Diouf 86'	Stadium: Marienlyst Stadion; Attendance: 6,806; Referee: Svein Oddvar Moen

25 October 2015 28	Odd	4–3	Sandefjord	Skien
18:00 CET (UTC+1)	Samuelsen 19', 90+2'; Diouf 56'; Occéan 87'	Summary	Morer 17', 62' (yellow card) 71'; Mjelde (yellow card) 25'; Mendy 86'; Kurtovic (yellow card) 89'	Stadium: Skagerak Arena; Attendance: 7,752; Referee: Dag Vidar Hafsås

1 November 2015 29	Vålerenga	2–2	Odd	Oslo
18:00 CET (UTC+1)	Hallberg 1'; Brown 24'; Berre (yellow card) 72'; Wæhler (yellow card) 90'	Summary	Jonassen (yellow card) 10'; Nordkvelle (yellow card) 39' (goal) 62'; Storbæk 85'; Occéan (yellow card) 90'	Stadium: Ullevål stadion Attendance: 9,753; Referee: Dag Vidar Hafsås

8 November 2015 30	Odd	5–0	Lillestrøm	Skien
18:00 CEST (UTC+2)	Bentley 16'; Occéan 54'; Nordkvelle 57', 81', 88'	Summary	Amundsen (yellow card) 35'	Stadium: Skagerak Arena; Attendance: 8,457; Referee: Trygve Kjensli

==== Table ====
Pos	Team	Pld	W	D	L	GF	GA	GD	Pts	Qualification or relegation
2	Strømsgodset	30	17	6	7	67	44	+23	57	Qualification for the Europa League second qualifying round
3	Stabæk	30	17	5	8	54	43	+11	56	Qualification for the Europa League first qualifying round
4	Odd	30	15	10	5	61	41	+20	55	Qualification for the Europa League first qualifying round
5	Viking	30	17	2	11	53	39	+14	53	
6	Molde	30	15	7	8	62	31	+31	52	

Source: Football Association of Norway (in Norwegian), Soccerway
Rules for classification: 1) Points; 2) Goal difference; 3) Goals scored; 4) Head-to-head points; 5) Head-to-head goal difference; 6) Head-to-head away goals scored (between two teams).

=== Norwegian Cup ===
22 April 2015 First Round	Skotfoss	0–13	Odd	Skotfoss
18:00 CEST (UTC+2)	E.Skogen (yellow card) 16'	Summary	Jonassen 10'; Lindseth 22', 37', 69', 87'; Zekhnini 24'; Johnsen 31'; Fredriksen 40', 90'; Lauritsen 59'; Berg 67'; Ruud 73'; Storbæk 89'	Stadium: Skotfoss Stadium; Attendance: 2,450; Referee: Tim Nicolai Fjellvang

6 May 2015 Second Round	Skeid	1–4	Odd	Oslo
18:00 CEST (UTC+2)	Bojang 42' (yellow card) 68'	Summary	Johnsen 13', 89' (yellow card) 70'; Jonassen 27'; Lindseth 90+1'	Stadium: Bislett Stadion; Attendance: 500; Referee: Tommy Frydenlund

3 June 2015 Third Round	Vindbjart	2–4	Odd	Vennesla
18:00 CEST (UTC+2)	Repstad 27'; Zernichow (yellow card) 45'; Jones 58'	Summary	Bentley 5'; Storbæk 36', (yellow card) 64'; Gashi (yellow card) 57'; Ruud 61'; Berg 75'	Stadium: Moseidmoen; Attendance: 2,611; Referee: Trygve Kjensli

24 June 2015 Fourth Round	Odd	4–0	Åsane	Skien
19:00 CEST (UTC+2)	Storbæk 4', 51'; Samuelsen (yellow card) 41'; Johnsen 62'; Occéan 87'	Summary		Stadium: Skagerak Arena; Attendance: 2,600; Referee: Martin Lundby

12 August 2015 Quarterfinal	Sarpsborg 08	2–1	Odd	Sarpsborg
18:00 CEST (UTC+2)	Zajić (yellow card) 9'; Mortensen 14', 47'; Trondsen (yellow card) 63'	Summary	Trondsen 6' (o.g.); Occéan (yellow card) 8'; Samuelsen (yellow card) 49'; Bentley (yellow card) 81'; Jonassen (yellow card) 86'	Stadium: Sarpsborg Stadion; Attendance: 2,366; Referee: Ken Henry Johnsen

=== Europa League ===
==== Qualifying phase ====
2 July 2015 1st qualifying round 1st leg	Sheriff (Moldova)	0–3	(Norway) Odd	Tiraspol, Moldova
19:00 CEST (UTC+2)	Cadú (yellow card) 84'; Yahaya (yellow card) 90+3'	Report	Akabueze 2' (yellow card) 67'; Johnsen 11'; Hagen 28'; Halvorsen (yellow card) 69'; Berg (yellow card) 74'	Stadium: Sheriff Stadium; Attendance: 6,628; Referee: Tsvetan Krastev (Bulgaria)

9 July 2015 1st qualifying round 2nd leg	Odd (Norway)	0–0 (3–0 agg.)	(Moldova) Sheriff	Skien, Norway
19:00 CEST (UTC+2)	Ruud (yellow card) 52'	Report	Potiguar (yellow card) 41'; V.Macrițchii (yellow card) 58'	Stadium: Skagerak Arena; Attendance: 3,981; Referee: Dejan Jakimovski (Republic of Macedonia)

16 July 2015 2nd qualifying round 1st leg	Shamrock Rovers (Republic of Ireland)	0–2	(Norway) Odd	Dublin, Ireland
21:00 CEST (UTC+2)		Report	Gashi (yellow card) 29'; Nordkvelle (yellow card) 35'; Occéan 53' (pen.), 67'; Storbæk (yellow card) 88'	Stadium: Tallaght Stadium; Attendance: 2,900; Referee: Alain Bieri (Switzerland)

23 July 2015 2nd qualifying round 2nd leg	Odd (Norway)	2–1 (4–1 agg.)	(Republic of Ireland) Shamrock Rovers	Skien, Norway
19:00 CEST (UTC+2)	Halvorsen 72'; Hagen 86'	Report	G.Brennan 90'	Stadium: Skagerak Arena; Attendance: 3,814; Referee: Ionuț Avram (Romania)

30 July 2015 3rd qualifying round 1st leg	Elfsborg (Sweden)	2–1	(Norway) Odd	Borås, Sweden
18:00 CEST (UTC+2)	Prodell 43'; Lundevall 76'	Report	Occéan 21' (pen.)	Stadium: Borås Arena; Attendance: 4,232; Referee: Ognjen Valjić (Bosnia and Herzegovina)

6 August 2015 3rd qualifying round 2nd leg	Odd (Norway)	2–0 (3–2 agg.)	(Sweden) Elfsborg	Skien, Norway
19:00 CEST (UTC+2)	Occéan 27' (yellow card) 64'; Bentley 71'	Report	Holmén (yellow card) 85'	Stadium: Skagerak Arena; Attendance: 6,106; Referee: Sergey Ivanov (Russia)

20 August 2015 Playoff round 1st leg	Odd (Norway)	3–4	(Germany) Borussia Dortmund	Skien, Norway
20:30 CEST (UTC+2)	Samuelsen 1'; Nordkvelle 20'; Ruud 22'; Jensen (yellow card) 42'	Report	Aubameyang 34', 76'; Kagawa 47'; Mkhitaryan 85'	Stadium: Skagerak Arena; Attendance: 12,436; Referee: Jorge Sousa (Portugal)

27 August 2015 Playoff round 2nd leg	Borussia Dortmund (Germany)	7–2 (11–5 agg.)	(Norway) Odd	Dortmund, Germany
20:30 CEST (UTC+2)	Mkhitaryan 25'; Reus 27', 32', 57'; Kagawa 40', 90'; Gündoğan 51'	Report	Halvorsen 19' (yellow card) 23'; Berg 64'	Stadium: Signal Iduna Park; Attendance: 64,200; Referee: Yevhen Aranovskiy (Ukraine)

== Squad statistics ==
As of match played 8 November 2015

=== Appearances and goals ===
No.	Pos	Nat	Player	Total		Tippeligaen		Norwegian Cup		UEFA Europa League	
No.	Pos	Nat	Player	Apps	Goals	Apps	Goals	Apps	Goals	Apps	Goals
1	GK	(Norway) NOR	Sondre Rossbach	42	0	30	0	4	0	8	0
2	DF	(Norway) NOR	Espen Ruud	39	6	28	3	3+1	2	7	1
3	MF	(Norway) NOR	Ardian Gashi	25	0	8+8	0	3	0	4+2	0
4	DF	(Norway) NOR	Vegard Bergan	15	0	4+2	0	3+1	0	2+3	0
5	DF	(Norway) NOR	Thomas Grøgaard	36	0	25+2	0	2+1	0	5+1	0
6	MF	(Norway) NOR	Oliver Berg	30	3	8+11	0	3+1	2	4+3	1
7	FW	(Norway) NOR	Ole Jørgen Halvorsen	35	7	16+8	5	2+1	0	6+2	2
8	MF	(Norway) NOR	Jone Samuelsen	37	5	26+1	4	3	0	6+1	1
9	FW	(Senegal) SEN	Pape Paté Diouf	12	5	9+1	5	0	0	2	0
10	FW	(Canada) CAN	Olivier Occéan	37	20	25+2	15	1+1	1	6+2	4
11	FW	(Norway) NOR	Frode Johnsen	14	8	3+6	2	4	5	1	1
12	FW	(Norway) NOR	Ulrik Flo	5	0	0+3	0	0	0	0+2	0
14	MF	(Norway) NOR	Fredrik Nordkvelle	31	10	23+1	9	1	0	6	1
15	MF	(Norway) NOR	Rafik Zekhnini	16	3	5+5	2	1+1	1	3+1	0
16	MF	(Norway) NOR	Jonathan Lindseth	3	5	0+1	0	1+1	5	0	0
18	DF	(Finland) FIN	Jarkko Hurme	5	0	2	0	2	0	1	0
19	DF	(Norway) NOR	Emil Jonassen	14	2	6+2	0	3	2	3	0
20	MF	(Norway) NOR	Fredrik Oldrup Jensen	30	1	20+2	1	3	0	4+1	0
21	DF	(Norway) NOR	Steffen Hagen	40	4	29	2	3	0	8	2
22	MF	(Norway) NOR	Håvard Storbæk	36	4	8+19	1	5+1	3	0+3	0
23	DF	(Norway) NOR	Lars Kristian Eriksen	35	1	26	1	2+1	0	6	0
24	GK	(Norway) NOR	Viljar Myhra	1	0	0	0	1	0	0	0
25	MF	(Norway) NOR	Mathias Fredriksen	8	2	0+5	0	2+1	2	0	0
26	FW	(Nigeria) NGR	Bentley	42	11	29+1	8	3+1	1	6+2	2
30	MF	(Norway) NOR	Tobias Lauritsen	1	1	0	0	0+1	1	0	0
Players away from Odd on loan:
9	FW	(Norway) NOR	Henrik Johansen	0	0	0	0	0	0	0	0
Players who appeared for Odd no longer at the club:

=== Goal scorers ===
Place	Position	Nation	Number	Name	Tippeligaen	Norwegian Cup	UEFA Europa League	Total
1	FW	(Canada)	10	Olivier Occéan	15	1	4	20
2	FW	(Nigeria)	26	Bentley	8	1	2	11
3	MF	(Norway)	14	Fredrik Nordkvelle	9	0	1	10
4	FW	(Norway)	11	Frode Johnsen	2	5	1	8
5	MF	(Norway)	7	Ole Jørgen Halvorsen	5	0	2	7
6	DF	(Norway)	2	Espen Ruud	3	2	1	6
7	FW	(Senegal)	9	Pape Paté Diouf	5	0	0	5
7	MF	(Norway)	8	Jone Samuelsen	4	0	1	5
7	MF	(Norway)	16	Jonathan Lindseth	0	5	0	5
10				Own goal	3	1	0	4
11	MF	(Norway)	15	Rafik Zekhnini	2	1	0	3
11	DF	(Norway)	21	Steffen Hagen	1	0	2	3
11	MF	(Norway)	22	Håvard Storbæk	0	3	0	3
11	MF	(Norway)	6	Oliver Berg	0	2	1	3
15	MF	(Norway)	20	Fredrik Oldrup Jensen	2	0	0	2
15	MF	(Norway)	25	Mathias Fredriksen	0	2	0	2
15	DF	(Norway)	19	Emil Jonassen	0	2	0	2
18	DF	(Norway)	23	Lars Kristian Eriksen	1	0	0	1
18	MF	(Norway)	22	Håvard Storbæk	1	0	0	1
18	MF	(Norway)	30	Tobias Lauritsen	0	1	0	1
				TOTALS	61	26	15	102

=== Disciplinary record ===
Number	Nation	Position	Name	Tippeligaen		Norwegian Cup		UEFA Europa League		Total	
Number	Nation	Position	Name	Yellow card	Red card	Yellow card	Red card	Yellow card	Red card	Yellow card	Red card
2	(Norway)	DF	Espen Ruud	5	0	0	0	1	0	6	0
3	(Norway)	MF	Ardian Gashi	3	1	1	0	1	0	6	1
5	(Norway)	DF	Thomas Grøgaard	1	0	0	0	0	0	1	0
6	(Norway)	MF	Oliver Berg	0	0	0	0	1	0	1	0
7	(Norway)	FW	Ole Jørgen Halvorsen	0	0	0	0	2	0	2	0
8	(Norway)	MF	Jone Samuelsen	3	0	2	0	1	0	6	0
10	(Canada)	FW	Olivier Occéan	4	0	1	0	2	0	7	0
11	(Norway)	FW	Frode Johnsen	0	0	1	0	0	0	1	0
14	(Norway)	MF	Fredrik Nordkvelle	2	0	0	0	1	0	3	0
19	(Norway)	DF	Emil Jonassen	1	0	1	0	0	0	2	0
20	(Norway)	MF	Fredrik Oldrup Jensen	3	0	0	0	1	0	4	0
21	(Norway)	DF	Steffen Hagen	2	0	0	0	0	0	2	0
22	(Norway)	MF	Håvard Storbæk	1	0	1	0	1	0	3	0
26	(Nigeria)	FW	Bentley	0	0	1	0	1	0	2	0
			TOTALS	26	1	8	0	12	0	46	1
