= 2014 Norwegian Football Cup final =

- Event: 2014 Norwegian Football Cup
Odd	Molde
0	2
- Date: 23 November 2014
- Venue: Ullevaal Stadion, Oslo
- Referee: Dag Vidar Hafsås
- Attendance: 26,582

The 2014 Norwegian Football Cup final was the 109th final of the Norwegian Football Cup. It was played on 23 November 2014 at Ullevaal Stadion, in Oslo, Norway. In the final Odd lost 2-0 to Molde, securing Molde's second cup title in a row and the double for the 2014 season. This was Molde's 7th cup final, while Odd traveled to Ullevaal for the 21st time. The winner will earn a place in the first qualifying round of the 2015–16 UEFA Europa League.

== Route to the final ==
Odd		Round	Molde	
Kjapp (D3); A 4–0	Johansen 17', 83', Helgerud 61', Halvorsen 71'	First round	Surnadal (D3); A 9–0	Svendsen 20', 64', 75', Diouf 39', 57', 66', 85', Agnaldo 60', Hollingen 82'
Fram Larvik (D2); A 4–2 aet	Shala 75', Johnsen 97', 103', Storbæk 100'	Second round	Strindheim (D3); A 1–0	Chima 90+3'
Notodden (D2); A 4–0	Akabueze 5', Nordkvelle 35', Halvorsen 45', 48'	Third round	Florø (D3); A 2–1	Toivio 5', Berg Hestad 61'
Vålerenga (TL); H 3–2	Johnsen 51', 58', Akabueze 90'	Fourth round	Mjøndalen (D1); H 4–1	Gulbrandsen 11', Elyounoussi 31', Chima 41', 79'
Brann (TL); H 3–1	Shala 66', 87', Kjelsrud Johansen 78'	Quarter-final	Viking (TL); H 5–1	Chima Chukwu 14', Elyounoussi 41', Moström 51', Flo 58', Gulbrandsen 69'
Sarpsborg 08 (TL); A 5–2	Shala 48', 71', Halvorsen 58', 90+3', Johnsen 66'	Semi-final	Stabæk (TL); A 1–0	Elyounoussi 86'

- (TL) = Tippeligaen team
- (D1) = 1. divisjon team
- (D2) = 2. divisjon team
- (D3) = 3. divisjon team

== Pre-match ==
=== Supporters ===
In the recent years, the two clubs has received 13,000 of the 25,500 tickets to the final, but after the expansion of Ullevaal Stadion the two clubs received 15,250 of the 27,000 tickets to the final. The remaining 10,000 tickets went to partners of the Norwegian Football Association.

== Match ==
=== Details ===
23 November 2014
13:15 CET (UTC+1)

Odd	0–2	Molde
	Report	Gulbrandsen 73'; Elyounoussi 89'

Ullevaal Stadion, Oslo
Attendance: 26,582
Referee: Dag Vidar Hafsås (Kolstad)

Odd	Molde

Odd:
GK	1	(Norway) André Hansen
RB	23	(Norway) Lars-Kristian Eriksen
CB	18	(Finland) Jarkko Hurme	(yellow card) 58'
CB	21	(Norway) Steffen Hagen (c)
LB	5	(Norway) Thomas Grøgaard
RM	14	(Norway) Fredrik Nordkvelle		(substituted off) 84'
CM	20	(Norway) Fredrik Oldrup Jensen		(substituted off) 81'
LM	8	(Norway) Jone Samuelsen	(yellow card) 69'
RW	26	(Nigeria) Bentley
CF	11	(Norway) Frode Johnsen
LW	10	(Albania) Herolind Shala		(substituted off) 66'
Substitutions:
GK	12	(Norway) Sondre Rossbach
DF	2	(Norway) Emil Jonassen
MF	3	(Norway) Ardian Gashi		(substituted on) 81'
DF	4	(Norway) Vegard Bergan
FW	7	(Norway) Ole Jørgen Halvorsen		(substituted on) 66'
MF	19	(Norway) Snorre Krogsgård
MF	22	(Norway) Håvard Storbæk		(substituted on) 84'
Head Coach:
(Norway) Dag-Eilev Fagermo

Molde:
GK	12	(Norway) Ørjan Nyland (c)
RB	14	(Norway) Martin Linnes
CB	5	(Finland) Joona Toivio
CB	25	(Norway) Vegard Forren
LB	15	(Norway) Per-Egil Flo
RM	9	(Sweden) Mattias Moström		(substituted off) 90'
CM	7	(Norway) Harmeet Singh
CM	16	(Norway) Etzaz Hussain
LM	24	(Norway) Mohamed Elyounoussi	(yellow card) 60'
CF	8	(Norway) Fredrik Gulbrandsen	(yellow card) 65'	(substituted off) 79'
CF	27	(Nigeria) Daniel Chima		(substituted off) 69'
Substitutions:
GK	1	(Norway) Espen Bugge Pettersen
DF	4	(Norway) Ruben Gabrielsen
MF	6	(Norway) Daniel Berg Hestad		(substituted on) 90'
FW	11	(Iceland) Björn Bergmann Sigurðarson		(substituted on) 69'
FW	20	(Norway) Tommy Høiland		(substituted on) 79'
DF	23	(Norway) Knut Olav Rindarøy
FW	32	(Norway) Sander Svendsen
Head Coach:
(Norway) Tor Ole Skullerud

MATCH OFFICIALS

- Assistant referees:
  - Jan Erik Engan (Loddefjord IL)
  - Kai Lafjell (Abildsø IL)
- Fourth official: Trond Ivar Døvle (Fjellhamar FK)

MATCH RULES

- 90 minutes.
- 30 minutes of extra-time if necessary.
- Penalty shoot-out if scores still level.
- Seven named substitutes.
- Maximum of three substitutions.

== See also ==
- 2014 Norwegian Football Cup
- 2014 Tippeligaen
- 2014 1. divisjon
- 2014 in Norwegian football
