= Einar Rossbach =

Norwegian footballer (born 1964)

Personal information
- Date of birth: 20 October 1964 (age 62)
- Place of birth: Porsgrunn, Norway
- Height: 1.89 m (6 ft 2 1/2 in)
- Position: Goalkeeper

Youth career
- Stridsklev
- Urædd

Senior career*
Years	Team	Apps	(Gls)
–1981	Urædd		
1982–1985	Pors	72	(0)
1986–1987	Ham-Kam	46	(0)
1988–1989	Pors Grenland	42	(0)
1990	Tromsø	22	(0)
1991–1993	Lyn	60	(0)
1994	Odd	16	(0)
1994–1995	Silkeborg	11	(0)
1999	Tollnes	5	(0)
2004	Pors	8	(0)

International career
1982	Norway U19	4	(0)
1984–1987	Norway U21	19	(0)
1990–1993	Norway	6	(0)

Managerial career
- 2008–2020: Odd (goalkeeping coach)
- * Club domestic league appearances and goals

Einar Rossbach (born 20 October 1964) is a Norwegian former international goalkeeper who played for Urædd, Ham-Kam, Tromsø, Lyn, Odd, Silkeborg, Tollnes and Pors Grenland. He was named goalkeeper of the year in both 1987 and in 1990, and received a Kniksen award in 1990 as "Goalkeeper of the year". VG named him "player of the year" in 1990.

== Playing career ==
Rossbach started his career with local clubs Stridklev, Urædd and Pors Grenland. In 1986 when Ham-Kam was promoted to the Norwegian Premier League they signed Rossbach. In 1990 Rossbach moved to Tromsø, and became part of the Tromsø team who finished second in the top flight. After a year in Tromsø Rossbach moved to Oslo to play for Lyn and to attend the Norwegian Police University College. Rossbach have made comebacks for both Tollnes and Pors Grenland when the clubs struggled with injuries on their goalies, the last time in 2004, when he at the age of 39, guarded the goal in the first games of the season. He's currently working at Grenland police station.

Rossbach was capped six times for Norway, and also capped at U19 and U21 level.

== Personal life ==
His son, Sondre Rossbach, is goalkeeper for Odds BK in the Norwegian Premier League. Concurrently with his son's Odd career, Einar Rossbach was the goalkeeper coach of Odd from 2008 to 2020.
