= Sondre Rossbach =

Norwegian footballer (born 1996)

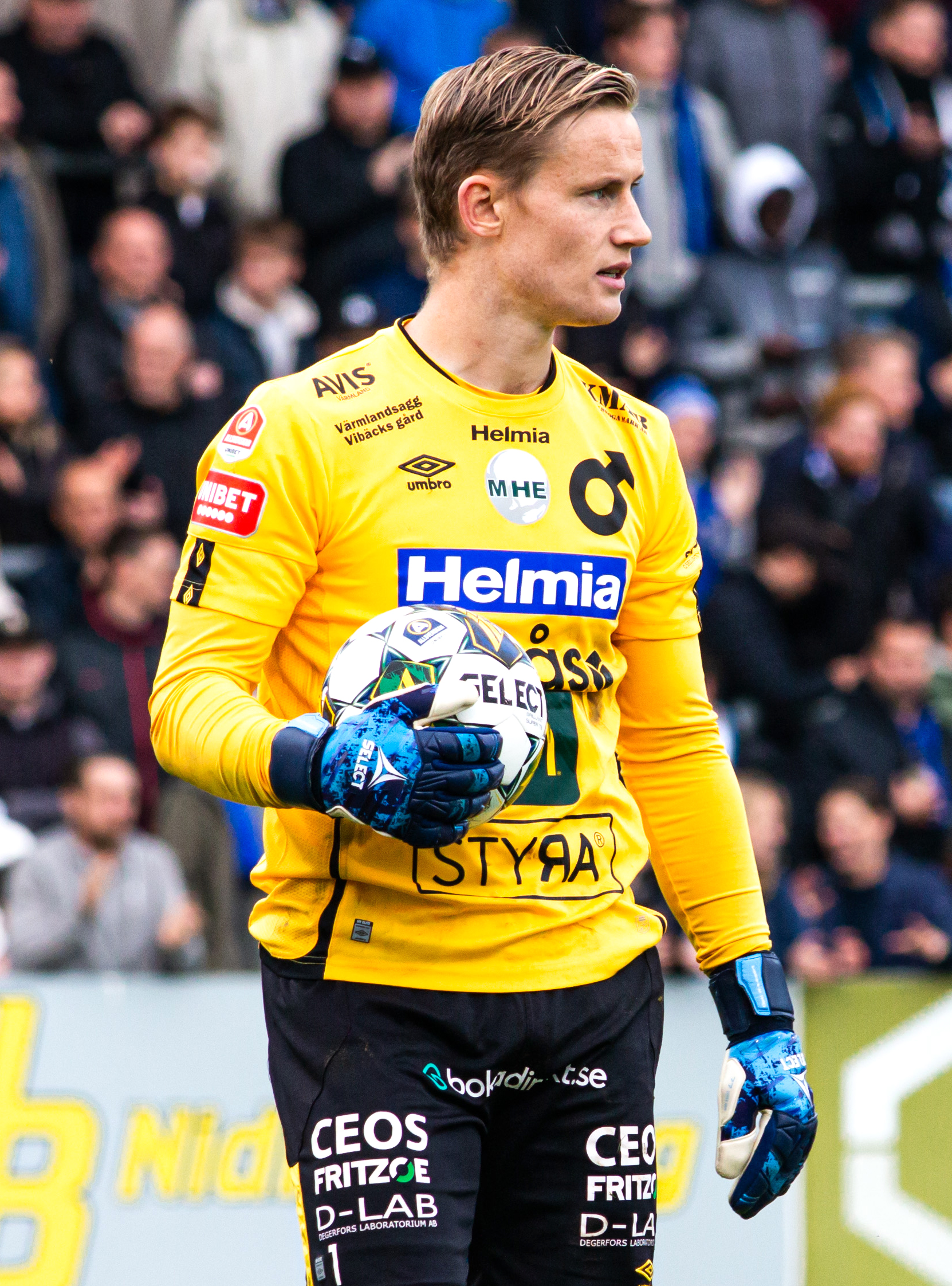

Personal information
- Full name: Sondre Løvseth Rossbach
- Date of birth: 7 February 1996 (age 30)
- Place of birth: Porsgrunn, Norway
- Height: 1.88 m (6 ft 2 in)
- Position: Goalkeeper

Youth career
- Brevik

Senior career*
Years	Team	Apps	(Gls)
2012–2023	Odd	197	(0)
2022	→ Vålerenga (loan)	2	(0)
2023	→ Degerfors IF (loan)	24	(0)
2024–2025	Stabæk	41	(0)

International career^{‡}
2012	Norway U16	8	(0)
2013	Norway U17	5	(0)
2014	Norway U18	3	(0)
2013	Norway U19	3	(0)
2013–2018	Norway U21	28	(0)
- * Club domestic league appearances and goals as of 23 July 2025 ‡ National team caps and goals as of 1 August 2019

Sondre Løvseth Rossbach (born 7 February 1996) is a Norwegian football goalkeeper.

== Playing career ==
=== Odd ===
Rossbach played youth football for Brevik and 3. divisjon football for Urædd, but joined Odd after the 2011 season. He made his senior league debut in September 2013 in a 5–1 win against Aalesund as André Hansen was injured.

Before he joined Odd back in 2011, he was offered a 4-year deal with Manchester United, but he had to decline as a result of an operation in his ankle. He was considered one of the most talented goalkeepers in Norway. Following the sale of André Hansen to Rosenborg BK in 2015, Rossbach was appointed to be the new goalkeeper at the age of 19.

In January 2023, Rossbach joined Allsvenskan club Degerfors IF on loan for the 2023 season.

=== Stabæk ===
After the 2023 season, Rossbach signed with Stabæk on a two-year contract.

== Personal life ==
He is a son of former Norway international goalkeeper Einar Rossbach. Rossbach is a member of the Norwegian supporters club of English football club Portsmouth F.C.

== Career statistics ==
=== Club ===
As of 25 July 2025

Appearances and goals by club, season and competition
Club	Season	League			National Cup (Note: Includes Norwegian Cup, Svenska Cupen)		Europe		Total	
Club	Season	Division	Apps	Goals	Apps	Goals	Apps	Goals	Apps	Goals
Odd	2013	Tippeligaen	7	0	1	0	—		8	0
Odd	2014	Tippeligaen	3	0	1	0	—		4	0
Odd	2015	Tippeligaen	30	0	4	0	8 (Note: Appearances in the UEFA Europa League)	0	42	0
Odd	2016	Tippeligaen	30	0	4	0	4	0	38	0
Odd	2017	Eliteserien	23	0	1	0	5	0	29	0
Odd	2018	Eliteserien	28	0	2	0	—		30	0
Odd	2019	Eliteserien	30	0	5	0	—		35	0
Odd	2020	Eliteserien	29	0	—		—		29	0
Odd	2021	Eliteserien	17	0	0	0	—		17	0
Odd	2022	Eliteserien	0	0	3	0	—		3	0
Odd	Total		197	0	21	0	17	0	235	0
Vålerenga (loan)	2022	Eliteserien	2	0	0	0	—		2	0
Vålerenga (loan)	Total		2	0	0	0	—		2	0
Degerfors (loan)	2023	Allsvenskan	24	0	3	0	—		27	0
Degerfors (loan)	Total		24	0	3	0	—		27	0
Stabæk	2024	1. divisjon	30	0	2	0	—		32	0
Stabæk	2025	1. divisjon	11	0	5	0	—		16	0
Stabæk	Total		41	0	7	0	—		48	0
Career total			264	0	31	0	17	0	312	0
