= Emil Jonassen =

Norwegian footballer (born 1993)

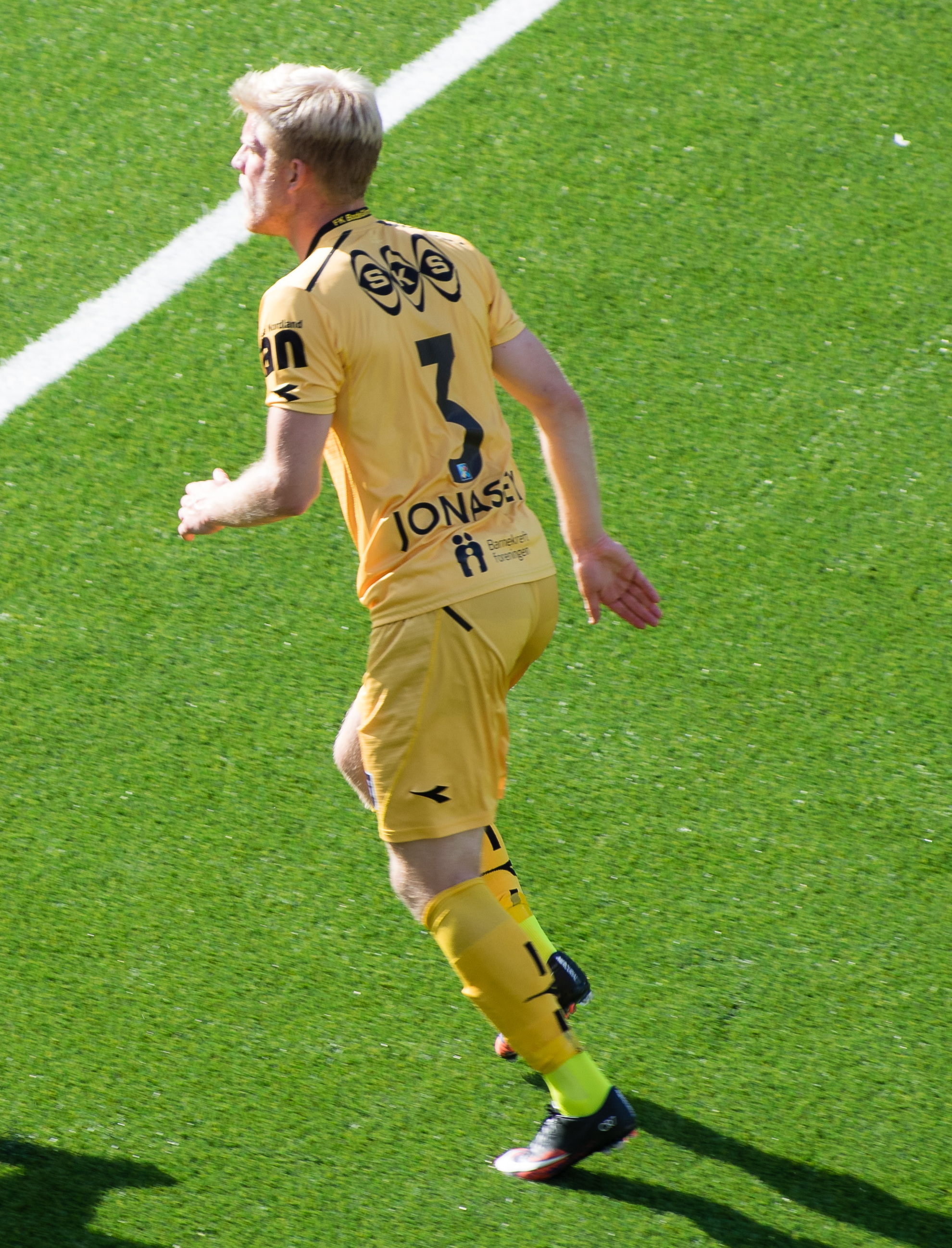
- Emil Jonassen Sætervik at 2016

Personal information
- Full name: Emil Jonassen Sætervik
- Date of birth: 17 February 1993 (age 33)
- Place of birth: Skien, Norway
- Height: 1.79 m (5 ft 10 1/2 in)
- Positions: Defender; left back

Youth career
- 1998–2010: Odd

Senior career*
Years	Team	Apps	(Gls)
2009–2015	Odd	65	(0)
2016–2018	Bodø/Glimt	64	(2)
2019	BATE Borisov	4	(0)
2020–2021	Stabæk	21	(0)
2021	Odd	4	(0)

International career^{‡}
2008	Norway U15	4	(1)
2009	Norway U16	11	(0)
2010	Norway U17	11	(0)
2011	Norway U18	10	(0)
2011–2012	Norway U19	4	(0)
2012	Norway U21	4	(0)
- * Club domestic league appearances and goals as of 14 January 2022 ‡ National team caps and goals as of 27 March 2013

Emil Jonassen Sætervik (born 17 February 1993) is a Norwegian former footballer.

He started playing for local club Odd at the age of five, and made his way to the first team.

== Career statistics ==
=== Club ===
As of match played 21 November 2020

Appearances and goals by club, season and competition
Club	Season	League			National Cup		Continental		Total	
Club	Season	Division	Apps	Goals	Apps	Goals	Apps	Goals	Apps	Goals
Odd	2009	Tippeligaen	0	0	0	0	—		0	0
Odd	2010	Tippeligaen	1	0	1	0	—		2	0
Odd	2011	Tippeligaen	9	0	0	0	—		9	0
Odd	2012	Tippeligaen	22	0	3	0	—		25	0
Odd	2013	Tippeligaen	22	0	4	0	—		26	0
Odd	2014	Tippeligaen	3	0	3	0	—		6	0
Odd	2015	Tippeligaen	8	0	4	2	3	0	15	2
Odd	Total		65	0	15	2	3	0	83	2
Bodø/Glimt	2016	Tippeligaen	22	1	4	0	—		26	1
Bodø/Glimt	2017	OBOS-ligaen	30	1	3	0	—		33	1
Bodø/Glimt	2018	Eliteserien	12	0	4	0	—		16	0
BATE Borisov	2019	Vysheyshaya Liga	4	0	0	0	—		4	0
BATE Borisov	Total		68	2	11	0	—		79	2
Stabæk	2020	Eliteserien	20	0	—		—		20	0
Stabæk	2021	Eliteserien	1	0	1	0	—		2	0
Stabæk	Total		21	0	1	0	—		22	0
Odd	2021	Eliteserien	4	0	0	0	—		4	0
Odd	Total		4	0	0	0	—		4	0
Career total			158	2	27	2	3	0	188	4
