= Thomas Grøgaard =

Norwegian footballer (born 1994)

Personal information
- Date of birth: 8 February 1994 (age 32)
- Place of birth: Arendal, Norway
- Height: 1.80 m (5 ft 11 in)
- Position: Defender

Youth career
- –2009: Kragerø
- 2010–2012: Odd

Senior career*
Years	Team	Apps	(Gls)
2012–2018	Odd	131	(1)
2018–2021	Brann	57	(1)
2021–2023	Strømsgodset	66	(1)
2024	Aalesund	26	(0)

International career^{‡}
2009	Norway U15	2	(0)
2010	Norway U16	3	(0)
2011	Norway U17	10	(0)
2012	Norway U18	10	(0)
2013	Norway U19	3	(0)
2013–2016	Norway U21	22	(0)
2014	Norway	1	(0)
- * Club domestic league appearances and goals as of 14 November 2024 ‡ National team caps and goals as of 11 October 2016

Thomas Grøgaard (born 8 February 1994) is a Norwegian football defender.

== Club career ==
=== Odd ===
He played youth football for Kragerø, but joined Odd's youth team after the 2009 season. In mid-2012 he signed for the senior team. He made his senior league debut in August 2013 in a 1–1 draw against Molde. His first goal at senior level came against the Finnish team Mariehamn in a first round Europa League qualifier that ended with a 2-0 victory on June 30, 2016.

=== Brann ===
Grøgaard originally signed a deal with Brann effectively from January 2019, but Brann decide to buy him in the summer transfer window.

=== Strømsgodset ===
Grøgaard signed a deal until the end of the 2023 season with Strømsgodset on 31 August 2021.

=== Aalesund ===
In February 2024, Grøgaard signed a one-season contract with Aalesund.

== International career ==
He was called up to the Norwegian national team for the first time ahead of a friendly match against United Arab Emirates on 27 August 2014, where he made his debut as a substitute in a 0-0 draw.

== Career statistics ==
=== Club ===
As of 7 March 2024

Appearances and goals by club, season and competition
Club	Season	League			National Cup		Europe		Total	
Club	Season	Division	Apps	Goals	Apps	Goals	Apps	Goals	Apps	Goals
Odd	2013	Tippeligaen	10	0	1	0	—		11	0
Odd	2014	Tippeligaen	30	0	5	0	—		35	0
Odd	2015	Tippeligaen	27	0	3	0	6 (Note: Appearances in UEFA Europa League)	0	36	0
Odd	2016	Tippeligaen	26	0	4	0	3	1	33	1
Odd	2017	Eliteserien	24	1	2	0	3	0	29	1
Odd	2018	Eliteserien	14	0	3	0	—		17	0
Odd	Total		131	1	18	0	12	1	161	2
Brann	2018	Eliteserien	12	0	0	0	—		12	0
Brann	2019	Eliteserien	13	0	4	1	—		17	1
Brann	2020	Eliteserien	24	1	0	0	—		24	1
Brann	2021	Eliteserien	8	0	0	0	—		8	0
Brann	Total		57	1	4	1	—		61	2
Strømsgodset	2021	Eliteserien	13	0	1	0	—		14	0
Strømsgodset	2022	Eliteserien	30	1	4	0	—		34	1
Strømsgodset	2023	Eliteserien	23	0	4	0	—		27	0
Strømsgodset	Total		66	1	9	0	—		75	1
Aalesund	2024	1. divisjon	0	0	0	0	—		0	0
Career total			254	3	31	1	12	1	297	5
