= IF Fram =

Swedish football club

- Full name: Idrottsföreningen Fram
- Founded: 1922
- Ground: Rangsby Stadium; Saltvik; Åland; Finland
- Head coach: Johan Danielsson
- Coach: Tony Jansson
- League: Division 6 Uppland Norra
- 2010: Division 6 Uppland Norra, 3rd
Home colours

IF Fram is a football club located in Saltvik in Åland. They no longer participate in the Finnish football league system but take part in the Swedish football league system.

== Background ==
Idrottsföreningen Fram are based in the municipality of Saltvik in Åland and were formed in 1922. The club currently specialises in football, athletics, skiing, hockey and table tennis.

In recent years IF Fram has participated in the lower divisions of the Swedish football league system. The club currently plays in Division 6 Uppland Norra which is the eighth tier of Swedish football. They play their home matches at the Rangsby Stadium in Saltvik.

IF Fram is affiliated to the Ålands Fotbollförbund.

== Season to season ==
Season	Level	Division	Section	Position	Movements
1999	Tier 8	Division 7	Uppland Östra	7th	
2000	Tier 8	Division 7	Uppland Östra	2nd	
2001	Tier 8	Division 7	Uppland Östra	1st	Promoted
2002	Tier 7	Division 6	Uppland Östra	4th	
2003	Tier 7	Division 6	Uppland Östra	5th	
2004	Tier 7	Division 6	Uppland Östra	2nd	
2005	Tier 7	Division 6	Uppland Östra	5th	
2006*	Tier 8	Division 6	Uppland Norra	7th	
2007	Tier 8	Division 6	Uppland Södra	6th	
2008	Tier 8	Division 6	Uppland Östra	6th	
2009	Tier 8	Division 6	Uppland Östra	9th	
2010	Tier 8	Division 6	Uppland Norra	3rd	
