= Mattias Andersson (footballer, born 1981) =

Swedish footballer and manager

Personal information
- Full name: Mattias Christer Andersson
- Date of birth: 7 October 1981 (age 45)
- Place of birth: Sweden
- Height: 1.82 m (5 ft 11 1/2 in)
- Position: Forward

Senior career*
Years	Team	Apps	(Gls)
2000–2002	Mjällby AIF	25	(6)
2003–2004	Raufoss	42	(11)
2004–2005	BK Häcken	11	(0)
2005	→ Västra Frölunda IF (loan)	12	(3)
2006–2009	Strømsgodset	68	(24)
2009–2010	Fredrikstad	25	(13)
2010–2013	Odd	27	(3)

Managerial career
- 2016–2017: Fløy
- 2017–2018: Arendal
- 2019–2021: Start (assistant)
- * Club domestic league appearances and goals as of 31 August 2013

Mattias Christer Andersson (born 7 October 1981) is a Swedish football manager and retired footballer. His clubs as a player include Myresjö IF, Mjällby AIF, Raufoss IL, BK Häcken, Strømsgodset IF, Fredrikstad FK and Odd Grenland.

== Career statistics ==
Season	Club	Division	League		Cup		Total	
Season	Club	Division	Apps	Goals	Apps	Goals	Apps	Goals
2003	Raufoss Fotball	1. divisjon	29	10	4	1	33	11
2004	Raufoss Fotball	1. divisjon	13	1	0	0	13	1
2005	BK Häcken	Allsvenskan	11	0	0	0	11	0
2006	Strømsgodset IF	1. divisjon	30	19	1	2	31	21
2007	Strømsgodset IF	Tippeligaen	6	1	0	0	6	1
2008	Strømsgodset IF	Tippeligaen	19	2	3	0	22	2
2009	Strømsgodset IF	Tippeligaen	13	2	1	0	14	2
2009	Fredrikstad FK	Tippeligaen	6	3	0	0	6	3
2010	Fredrikstad FK	1. divisjon	19	10	2	4	21	14
2010	Odd	Tippeligaen	4	0	0	0	4	0
2011	Odd	Tippeligaen	7	2	2	1	9	3
2012	Odd	Tippeligaen	12	1	2	0	14	1
2013	Odd	Tippeligaen	4	0	0	0	4	0
Career Total			173	51	15	8	188	59

== Honours ==
=== Norway ===
- 1. divisjon top scorer: 2006
- Kniksen award: 1. divisjon player of the year in 2006
