= Mohamed Elyounoussi =

Norway international footballer (born 1994)

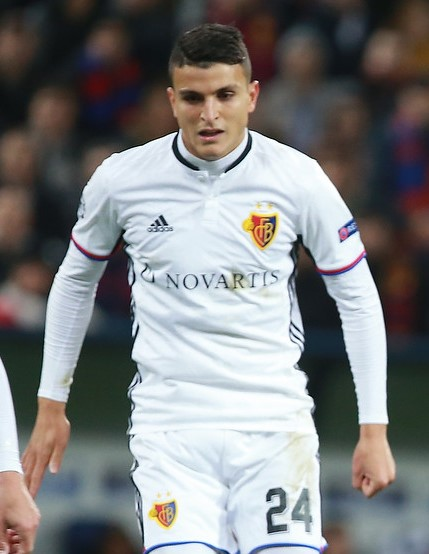
- Elyounoussi with Basel in 2017

Personal information
- Full name: Mohamed Amine Elyounoussi
- Date of birth: 4 August 1994 (age 32)
- Place of birth: Al Hoceima, Morocco
- Height: 1.78 m (5 ft 10 in)
- Positions: Forward; winger; attacking midfielder

Team information
- Current team: Copenhagen
- Number: 10

Youth career
- Sarpsborg FK
- Sarpsborg 08

Senior career*
Years	Team	Apps	(Gls)
2011–2014	Sarpsborg 08	64	(15)
2014–2016	Molde	70	(30)
2016–2018	Basel	65	(21)
2018–2023	Southampton	79	(5)
2019–2021	→ Celtic (loan)	44	(14)
2023–	Copenhagen	97	(32)

International career^{‡}
2009	Norway U15	2	(0)
2011	Norway U17	4	(0)
2012	Norway U18	5	(0)
2012	Norway U19	3	(2)
2013–2016	Norway U21	19	(5)
2013	Norway U23	1	(0)
2014–2024	Norway	55	(10)
- * Club domestic league appearances and goals as of 18 October 2026 ‡ National team caps and goals as of 26 March 2024

Mohamed Amine Elyounoussi (Arabic: مُحَمَّد أَمِين الْيُونُسِيّ; born 4 August 1994), nicknamed Moi (Norwegian pronunciation: [ˈmùːɪ]), is a professional footballer who plays forward, attacking midfielder or winger for Danish Superliga club Copenhagen. Born in Morocco, he previously played for the Norway national team.

== Early life ==
Elyounoussi was born in Al Hoceima, Morocco and moved to Sarpsborg in Norway at a young age, where he started his professional career.

== Club career ==
=== Sarpsborg 08 ===
He made his debut in Tippeligaen when he came on as a substitute in Sarpsborg 08's match against Odd Grenland on 8 May 2011.

=== Molde ===
On 15 March 2014, Elyounoussi moved to fellow Tippeligaen side Molde FK. During his first season with Molde FK he played in every league match and was the club's top scorer with 13 goals. With the club, Elyounoussi won both Tippeligaen and the Norwegian Cup in his first season, which meant that Molde won the double for the first time in the club's history. He scored four goals in the 2014 Norwegian Cup, of which one was scored in the final against Odd. Elyounoussi scored a total of 17 goals in all competitions in the 2014 season and became Molde's top goalscorer.

In 2015, Elyounoussi scored three goals in the 2015–16 UEFA Europa League, all in the group stage. He scored twice against Celtic and once against Fenerbahçe and helped the team advance to the Round of 16 where they lost 1–3 on aggregate against Sevilla.

=== Basel ===
On 6 July 2016, Elyounoussi moved to Swiss Super League side FC Basel on a four-year contract. He joined Basel's first team for their 2016–17 season under head coach Urs Fischer. After playing in four test games he made his domestic league debut on 24 July in the 3–0 home win at the St. Jakob-Park against Sion. He scored his first goal for his new club just one week later on 31 July during the away game against Vaduz. It was the third Basler goal of the game and they won 5–1. Elyounoussi scored a hat trick for Basel on 4 February 2017 during the home game against Lugano. These were the first three goals and were scored during the first 36 minutes of the game that Basel won 4–0. Under trainer Urs Fischer, Elyounoussi won the Swiss Super League championship at the end of the 2016–17 season. For the club this was the eighth title in a row and their 20th championship title in total. They also won the Swiss Cup for the twelfth time, which meant they had won the double for the sixth time in the club's history.

He stayed with the club for two seasons and during this time Elyounoussi played a total of 102 games for Basel scoring a total of 27 goals. 65 of these games were in the Swiss Super League, eight in the Swiss Cup, 11 in the Champions League and 18 were friendly games. He scored 21 goals in the domestic league, two in the Champions League and the other four were scored during the test games.

=== Southampton ===
==== 2018–19: Debut season in the Premier League ====
On 29 June 2018, Elyounoussi was signed by Southampton for a reported fee of £16 million, signing a five-year contract. On 12 August 2018, Elyounoussi made his Premier League debut in a 0–0 draw with Burnley, replacing Cédric in the 56th minute. Despite making 19 appearances in all competitions throughout the season, Elyounoussi would not score any goals for the club. Elyounoussi stated he found it “hard” to gain momentum.

What was missing last season? It was all small details. It didn’t start great because I was injured and it took some time, it was my first game and I got an injury when I’d never had one in my career.

— Elyounoussi reflecting on his first season at Southampton.

==== 2019–2021: Loan to Celtic ====
On 30 August 2019, Elyounoussi joined Celtic on loan until the end of the season. On 14 September 2019, Elyounoussi made his first appearance for Celtic in a 0–1 victory against Hamilton. Elyounoussi would score his first goal for the club on 3 October 2019 in a 2–0 victory against CFR Cluj in the Europa League. On 19 October 2019, Elyounoussi scored his first goals in the Scottish Premiership when he scored a brace in a 6–0 victory against Ross County.

On 30 June 2020, the loan was extended for a further season. Elyounoussi scored a brace on 18 August 2020 in a 6–0 victory against KR Reykjavik in the Champions League. On 8 November 2020, Elyounoussi scored a hat-trick in a 4–1 victory at Motherwell. On 21 March 2021, Elyounoussi scored in a 1–1 draw against Rangers which meant they could not match Celtic's 106-point haul in the 2016–17 season.

==== 2021–22: Return to Southampton ====
On 25 August 2021, he scored a hat-trick in an emphatic 8–0 win over League Two side Newport County in the second round of the EFL Cup. It was the biggest away win in Southampton's 135-year history and matched their biggest post-war win. On 28 August 2021, Elyounoussi scored his first Premier League goal for Southampton in their 2–2 draw with Newcastle. On 26 December 2021, Elyounoussi scored in a 2–3 victory against West Ham. Elyounoussi scored his first goal in the FA Cup on 8 January 2022 in a 2–3 victory against Swansea City. On 9 February 2022, Elyounoussi scored in a 2–3 victory against Tottenham Hotspur. His final goal of the 2021–22 season came on 13 March 2022 in a 1–2 defeat to Watford. This was his most prolific season for Southampton.

==== 2022–23 ====
On 13 August 2022, Elyounoussi made his first appearance of the season in a 2–2 draw with Leeds United. He scored his only goal of the campaign in the penultimate game of the season in a 3–1 defeat to Brighton. On 14 June 2023, Elyounoussi confirmed he would leave Southampton following the expiry of his contract at the end of the month.

=== F.C. Copenhagen ===
On 27 July 2023, Elyounoussi signed a four-year contract with FC Copenhagen on a free transfer.

== International career ==
In June 2011, Elyounoussi was called up for the Norway U-17 team.

In November 2013, he was called up to the senior Norwegian national team for their January 2014 international matches in Abu Dhabi. He made his debut there against Poland on 18 January 2014, replacing Erik Huseklepp in the 33rd minute of a 3–0 defeat. He scored his first goal for Norway on 13 June 2017 against Sweden. He scored his first hat-trick for Norway on 5 October 2017 against San Marino.

== Personal life ==
His cousin, Tarik Elyounoussi, is also a Norwegian international footballer who last played for the Japanese side, Shonan Bellmare.

Elyounoussi's father used to own a pizza parlour in Norway, where Mohamed worked while living in his home town.

== Career statistics ==
=== Club ===
As of match played 18 October 2026

Appearances and goals by club, season and competition
Club	Season	Division	League		National cup (Note: Includes Norwegian Cup, Swiss Cup, FA Cup, Scottish Cup, Danish Cup)		League cup (Note: Includes EFL Cup, Scottish League Cup)		Europe		Total	
Club	Season	Division	Apps	Goals	Apps	Goals	Apps	Goals	Apps	Goals	Apps	Goals
Sarpsborg 08	2011	Tippeligaen	9	0	1	0	—		—		10	0
Sarpsborg 08	2012	1. divisjon	26	9	3	1	—		—		29	10
Sarpsborg 08	2013	Tippeligaen	29	6	1	0	—		—		30	6
Sarpsborg 08	Total		64	15	5	1	—		0	0	69	16
Molde	2014	Tippeligaen	30	13	4	4	—		3 (Note: Appearances in UEFA Europa League)	0	37	17
Molde	2015	Tippeligaen	28	12	1	0	—		11 (Note: Four appearances and three goals in UEFA Champions League, seven appearances and four goals in UEFA Europa League)	7	40	19
Molde	2016	Tippeligaen	12	5	1	1	—		2	0	15	6
Molde	Total		70	30	6	5	—		16	7	92	42
Basel	2016–17	Swiss Super League	32	10	5	0	—		3 (Note: Appearances in UEFA Champions League)	0	40	10
Basel	2017–18	Swiss Super League	33	11	3	0	—		8	2	44	13
Basel	Total		65	21	8	0	—		11	2	84	23
Southampton	2018–19	Premier League	16	0	2	0	1	0	—		19	0
Southampton	2019–20	Premier League	0	0	0	0	0	0	—		0	0
Southampton	2020–21	Premier League	0	0	0	0	0	0	—		0	0
Southampton	2021–22	Premier League	30	4	2	1	1	3	—		33	8
Southampton	2022–23	Premier League	33	1	1	0	3	0	—		37	1
Southampton	Total		79	5	5	1	5	3	—		89	9
Celtic (loan)	2019–20	Scottish Premiership	10	4	2	1	3	2	6	1	21	8
Celtic (loan)	2020–21	Scottish Premiership	34	10	2	1	2	0	9 (Note: Two appearances and two goals in UEFA Champions League, seven appearances and four goals in UEFA Europa League)	6	45	17
Celtic (loan)	Total		44	14	4	2	5	2	15	7	66	25
Copenhagen	2023–24	Danish Superliga	30	10	3	1	—		12	3	45	14
Copenhagen	2024–25	Danish Superliga	27	8	6	1	—		15 (Note: Appearances in UEFA Conference League)	2	48	11
Copenhagen	2025–26	Danish Superliga	31	7	6	2	—		13	2	50	11
Copenhagen	2026–27	Danish Superliga	9	7	0	0	—		7	3	16	10
Copenhagen	Total		97	32	15	4	—		47	10	159	46
Career total			419	117	43	13	10	5	89	26	559	161

=== International ===
As of match played 26 March 2024

Appearances and goals by national team and year
National team	Year	Apps	Goals
Norway	2014	2	0
Norway	2015	3	0
Norway	2016	0	0
Norway	2017	9	4
Norway	2018	8	1
Norway	2019	2	0
Norway	2020	4	1
Norway	2021	11	3
Norway	2022	10	0
Norway	2023	5	1
Norway	2024	1	0
Total		55	10

As of match played 26 March 2024
Norway score listed first, score column indicates score after each Elyounoussi goal

List of international goals scored by Mohamed Elyounoussi
No.	Date	Venue	Opponent	Score	Result	Competition
1	13 June 2017	Ullevaal Stadion, Oslo, Norway	Sweden	1–0	1–1	Friendly
2	5 October 2017	San Marino Stadium, Serravalle, San Marino	San Marino	4–0	8–0	2018 FIFA World Cup qualification
3	5 October 2017	San Marino Stadium, Serravalle, San Marino	San Marino	5–0	8–0	2018 FIFA World Cup qualification
4	5 October 2017	San Marino Stadium, Serravalle, San Marino	San Marino	7–0	8–0	2018 FIFA World Cup qualification
5	16 October 2018	Ullevaal Stadion, Oslo, Norway	Bulgaria	1–0	1–0	2018–19 UEFA Nations League C
6	7 September 2020	Windsor Park, Belfast, Northern Ireland	Northern Ireland	1–0	5–1	2020–21 UEFA Nations League B
7	4 September 2021	Daugava Stadium, Riga, Latvia	Latvia	2–0	2–0	2022 FIFA World Cup qualification
8	11 October 2021	Ullevaal Stadion, Oslo, Norway	Montenegro	1–0	2–0	2022 FIFA World Cup qualification
9	11 October 2021	Ullevaal Stadion, Oslo, Norway	Montenegro	2–0	2–0	2022 FIFA World Cup qualification
10	19 November 2023	Hampden Park, Glasgow, Scotland	Scotland	3–3	3–3	UEFA Euro 2024 qualifying

== Honours ==
Molde

- Tippeligaen: 2014
- Norwegian Cup: 2014

Basel

- Swiss Super League: 2016–17
- Swiss Cup: 2016–17

Celtic

- Scottish Premiership: 2019–20
- Scottish Cup: 2019–20
- Scottish League Cup: 2019–20

Copenhagen

- Danish Superliga: 2024–25
- Danish Cup: 2024–25

Individual

- Swiss Super League Team of the Year: 2017–18
- Danish Superliga Team of the Month: March 2024
