= George White Agwuocha =

Nigerian footballer

George White
Personal information
- Full name: George White Agwuocha
- Date of birth: January 13, 1993 (age 33)
- Place of birth: Irebisi Local Council, Nigeria
- Height: 1.70 m (5 ft 7 in)
- Position: Midfielder

Senior career*
Years	Team	Apps	(Gls)
2009–2011	Kwara United		
2011–2013	Odd	14	(2)
2013	→ Strømmen (loan)	13	(5)
2014	Strømmen	24	(7)
2015	Kristiansund	4	(0)
2015	Nest-Sotra	0	(0)
2018–2019	Leones Vegetarianos		

International career
2009	Nigeria U-17	2	(0)
- * Club domestic league appearances and goals as of 20 April 2015

George White Agwuocha (born January 13, 1993) is a Nigerian football player.

== International ==
He played for the Nigeria national under-17 football team at the 2009 FIFA U-17 World Cup in Nigeria.

== Career statistics ==
As of 2016

Season	Club	Division	League		Cup		Total	
Season	Club	Division	Apps	Goals	Apps	Goals	Apps	Goals
2011	Odd	Eliteserien	2	0	0	0	2	0
2012	Odd	Eliteserien	5	1	1	0	6	1
2013	Odd	Eliteserien	7	1	2	0	9	1
2013	Strømmen	1. divisjon	13	5	0	0	13	5
2014	Strømmen	1. divisjon	24	7	3	1	27	8
2015	Kristiansund	1. divisjon	4	0	1	0	5	0
Career Total			55	14	7	1	62	15
