= Mathias Fredriksen =

Norwegian footballer (born 1994)

Personal information
- Date of birth: 28 April 1994 (age 32)
- Place of birth: Porsgrunn, Norway
- Height: 1.70 m (5 ft 7 in)
- Position: Midfielder

Team information
- Current team: Fløy-Flekkerøy
- Number: 77

Youth career
- –2009: Tollnes
- 2010–2012: Odd

Senior career*
Years	Team	Apps	(Gls)
2012–2016	Odd	12	(0)
2016–2020	Mjøndalen	64	(9)
2021–	Fløy-Flekkerøy	26	(3)

International career^{‡}
2012	Norway U18	10	(0)
2013	Norway U19	4	(0)
- * Club domestic league appearances and goals as of 11 August 2023 ‡ National team caps and goals as of 17 August 2020

Mathias Fredriksen (born 28 April 1994) is a Norwegian footballer who plays as a midfielder for the PostNord-ligaen side Fløy-Flekkerøy.

He played youth football for Tollnes, but joined Odd's youth team after the 2009 season. In mid-2012 he signed for the senior team. He was also capped as a Norway youth international. Fredriksen made his senior league debut in a May 2013 0-1 loss against Start.

== Career statistics ==
As of 17 August 2020

Season	Club	Division	League		Cup		Total	
Season	Club	Division	Apps	Goals	Apps	Goals	Apps	Goals
2012	Odd	Eliteserien	0	0	2	1	2	1
2013	Odd	Eliteserien	7	0	2	1	9	1
2014	Odd	Eliteserien	0	0	2	0	2	0
2015	Odd	Eliteserien	5	0	3	2	8	2
2016	Mjøndalen	1. divisjon	24	2	1	0	25	2
2017	Mjøndalen	1. divisjon	28	4	1	0	29	4
2018	Mjøndalen	1. divisjon	8	2	0	0	8	2
2019	Mjøndalen	Eliteserien	2	0	0	0	2	0
2020	Mjøndalen	Eliteserien	1	0	0	0	1	0
Career Total			75	8	11	4	86	12
