= Snorre Krogsgård =

Norwegian footballer (born 1991)

Snorre Krokus
Personal information
- Full name: Snorre Krogsgård
- Date of birth: 25 May 1991 (age 35)
- Place of birth: Skien, Norway
- Height: 1.88 m (6 ft 2 in)
- Position: Midfielder

Youth career
- Hei
- Odd

Senior career*
Years	Team	Apps	(Gls)
2009–2013	Odd	69	(5)
2014	Fram	15	(3)
2014	Odd	6	(1)
2015	Halmstads BK	26	(0)
- * Club domestic league appearances and goals as of 1 January 2016

Snorre Krokus (born 25 May 1991) is a Norwegian footballer who plays as a midfielder.

He previously played for Odd Grenland in Tippeligaen, appearing in 28 of 30 league games in 2012. Ahead of the 2014 season he joined IF Fram.

== Career statistics ==
As of 26 October 2014

Season	Club	Division	League		Cup		Total	
Season	Club	Division	Apps	Goals	Apps	Goals	Apps	Goals
2009	Odd	Tippeligaen	0	0	2	0	2	0
2010	Odd	Tippeligaen	2	0	1	0	3	0
2011	Odd	Tippeligaen	24	1	4	0	28	1
2012	Odd	Tippeligaen	28	3	2	0	30	3
2013	Odd	Tippeligaen	15	1	4	2	19	3
2014	Fram	2. divisjon	15	3	2	0	17	3
2014	Odd	Tippeligaen	6	0	1	0	7	0
