= Christer Kleiven =

Norwegian footballer (born 1988)

Personal information
- Full name: Christer Kleiven
- Date of birth: 9 April 1988 (age 38)
- Place of birth: Kristiansand, Norway
- Height: 1.81 m (5 ft 11 in)
- Position: Midfielder

Team information
- Current team: Vigør

Youth career
- Vigør FK
- IK Start

Senior career*
Years	Team	Apps	(Gls)
2007–2012	IK Start	108	(11)
2012	Stabæk	30	(3)
2013–2014	Odd	16	(0)
2015–	Vigør	0	(0)
- * Club domestic league appearances and goals as of 17 February 2015

Christer Kleiven (born 9 April 1988) is a Norwegian midfielder who plays for Vigør in the 3. divisjon.

== Club career ==
=== FK Vigør ===
As a youth player Kleiven played for Vigør.

=== IK Start ===
He made his debut for Start in 2007, playing in Adeccoligaen. He made 35 appearances and scored 3 goals that season.

Christer Kleiven had a good start in Tippeligaen 2010. Having scored no goals for IK Start in Tippeligaen, he started the season off with 5 goals in 5 matches.

=== Stabæk Fotball ===
Before the 2012 season, Christer Kleiven signed a contract with Norwegian Premier League club Stabæk.

=== Odd ===
Before the 2013-season, Christer Kleiven signed a contract with Odd after one season at Stabæk.

== Career statistics ==
As of 25 September 2014

Club	Season	Division	League		Cup		Total	
Club	Season	Division	Apps	Goals	Apps	Goals	Apps	Goals
2007	Start	Tippeligaen	8	0	3	2	11	2
2008	Start	Adeccoligaen	28	3	1	1	29	4
2009	Start	Tippeligaen	22	0	2	0	24	0
2010	Start	Tippeligaen	25	7	4	2	29	9
2011	Start	Tippeligaen	25	1	5	0	30	1
2012	Stabæk	Tippeligaen	30	3	2	1	32	4
2013	Odd	Tippeligaen	16	0	3	1	19	1
2014	Odd	Tippeligaen	0	0	2	0	2	0
2015	Vigør	3. divisjon	0	0	0	0	0	0
Career Total			154	14	22	7	176	21
