= Alexander Mathisen =

Norwegian footballer (born 1986)

Personal information
- Full name: Alexander Myhre Moccia Mathisen
- Date of birth: 24 November 1986 (age 39)
- Place of birth: Oslo, Norway
- Height: 1.82 m (6 ft 0 in)
- Positions: Defender; midfielder

Youth career
- 2002: Parma

Senior career*
Years	Team	Apps	(Gls)
2003–2007	Vålerenga	21	(2)
2008–2010	Aalesund	62	(13)
2011–2012	Lierse	11	(0)
2013	Hønefoss	20	(3)
2014–2015	Vålerenga	44	(2)
2016	Nordstrand	3	(0)
2018–2019	Gamle Oslo		

International career
2002	Norway U-16	1	(0)
2003	Norway U-17	7	(1)
2004	Norway U-18	7	(2)
2005	Norway U-19	5	(1)
2006	Norway U-21	12	(3)
- * Club domestic league appearances and goals

Alexander Myhre Moccia Mathisen (born 24 November 1986) is a retired Norwegian footballer.

== Career ==
Born in Oslo, Mathisen played for the youth team of the Italian side Parma. He made his Norway youth international debut in 2002.

In 2004, he made his debut in the Tippeligaen with Vålerenga.

Ahead of the 2008 season, Mathisen joined Aalesund from Vålerenga.

== Career statistics ==
As of 18 March 2016

Season	Club	Division	League		Cup		Total	
Season	Club	Division	Apps	Goals	Apps	Goals	Apps	Goals
2004	Vålerenga	Tippeligaen	1	0	0	0	1	0
2005	Vålerenga	Tippeligaen	4	1	1	0	5	1
2006	Vålerenga	Tippeligaen	10	1	2	1	12	2
2007	Vålerenga	Tippeligaen	6	0	2	2	8	2
2008	Aalesund	Tippeligaen	18	0	1	0	19	0
2009	Aalesund	Tippeligaen	22	4	4	2	26	6
2010	Aalesund	Tippeligaen	22	9	2	0	24	9
2011–12	Lierse	Belgian Pro League	11	0	0	0	11	0
2013	Hønefoss	Tippeligaen	20	3	0	0	20	3
2014	Vålerenga	Tippeligaen	24	1	1	0	25	1
2015	Vålerenga	Tippeligaen	20	1	1	0	21	1
2016	Nordstrand	3. divisjon	3	0	2	1	5	1
Career total			161	20	16	6	177	26
