= Frode Johnsen =

Norwegian footballer (born 1974)

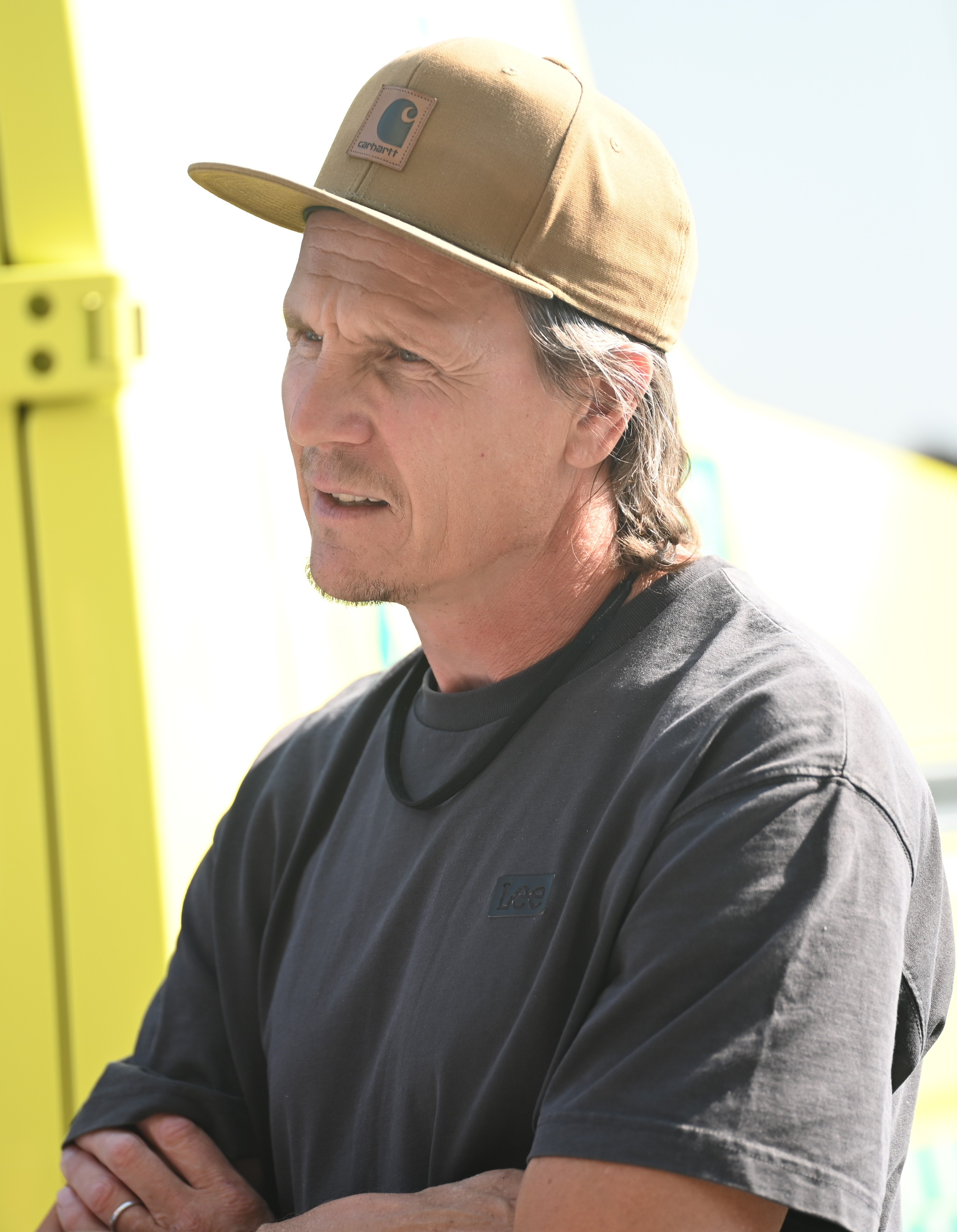
- Johnsen in 2026

Personal information
- Date of birth: 17 March 1974 (age 52)
- Place of birth: Skien, Norway
- Height: 1.88 m (6 ft 2 in)
- Position: Forward

Youth career
- Skotfoss TIF

Senior career*
Years	Team	Apps	(Gls)
1993–2000	Odd Grenland	113	(24)
2000–2006	Rosenborg	145	(80)
2006–2008	Nagoya Grampus	77	(35)
2009–2010	Shimizu S-Pulse	62	(17)
2011–2015	Odd	121	(40)
Total		518	(196)

International career
2000–2013	Norway	35	(10)
- * Club domestic league appearances and goals

Frode Johnsen (born 17 March 1974) is a Norwegian former professional footballer who played for Odd and Rosenborg in the Tippeligaen and for Nagoya Grampus and Shimizu S-Pulse in Japan. He played in several positions, but was preferred as a striker or midfielder. Johnsen is 188 cm tall, and was a good header of the ball.

In his final season for Odds BK in 2015, Johnsen won the Kniksen's Honour Award for his long career as a footballer. He retired in the age of 41. In 2013, he became the topscorer in Tippeligaen, which also made him the oldest topscorer in a European league ever.

== Club career ==
=== Early years ===
Johnsen began his career with minnows Skotfoss TIF, but did not make his Tippeligaen debut until a switch to Odd Grenland where he made his debut in the Norwegian Premier League in 1999 at the age of 25.

=== Rosenborg ===
==== 2000 ====
He was transferred to Rosenborg mid-season in 2000, as a replacement for John Carew. Johnsen previously studied to be a police officer during his time in Odd Grenland, but quit school to play for Rosenborg. He played fifteen games for Rosenborg in his first season, scoring nine goals – 12 in total, as he scored three goals for Odd before the switch. His new club and he won the championship. Rosenborg narrowly missed out on qualifying from the group stage of the Champions League. Johnsen did very well, scoring five goals in six games – including a hat-trick against Helsingborg. As they finished third, they advanced to the UEFA Cup where they crashed out in the first round to Alavés, Johnsen scored the goal in the 1–1 away leg, but could not prevent Rosenborg from losing 3–1 at home.

==== 2001 ====
In his first full season he became joint top-scorer with 17 goals (shared with Thorstein Helstad and Clayton Zane), playing in all games but one. Rosenborg won the league again by a single point ahead of Lillestrøm. In the Champions League Rosenborg finished fourth in their group. Johnsen played in all six games but one and did not score any goals, though he netted one in the qualifiers.

==== 2002 ====
Johnsen won his third championship in a row in 2002. He only played in 17 out of 26 games due to injury, scoring seven goals. In the Champions League he scored twice in the qualification round, but did not score any in the group stages as Rosenborg only got four points and finished last, despite losing only two games.

==== 2003 ====
He was involved in every game in the 2003 season as Rosenborg cruised through the championship, winning by 14 points. Johnsen scored 15 goals, only beaten with two by teammate Harald Brattbakk. He also won the cup with Rosenborg over Bodø/Glimt, scoring the equaliser as Rosenborg eventually won 3–1. He was the top scorer of the cup, scoring 11 goals in seven games. In the Champions League, Rosenborg and Johnsen failed to reach the group stage, losing narrowly to Deportivo in the qualifiers. They still got to play UEFA Cup, and had a good run before losing on away goals to Benfica. Johnsen played in all but one game in Europe this season, scoring two goals in nine games.

==== 2004 ====
The 2004 season was dramatic and very memorable season for Frode Johnsen. Rosenborg fought with Vålerenga for the championship, and before the last game of the season, Rosenborg was in the lead, but only on more scored goals. Seven minutes from time in Rosenborg's game against FC Lyn, Vålerenga made it 3–0 in their league game. Rosenborg was leading 3–1 at the time and needed one more to win the league, and in stoppage time Frode Johnsen scored his third of the game with a diving header, winning the championship . Johnsen played in all game and was named top scorer that year, notching up 19 goals in the process. He did not score as many in Europe, but nevertheless, Rosenborg was back in the Champions League. Only two points this time, and Johnsen scored two goals in total (w/ Q-rounds).

==== 2005 ====
After winning five championships in a row, the 2005 season was a devastating one as his team only finished 7th. Johnsen scored only seven goals in his 23 games that season. In 2005, both RCD Mallorca and AC Sparta Prague were interested in signing Johnsen, but nothing happened. He was involved in all Champions League games, but did not score. They finished third in a group which contained Real Madrid, Lyon and Olympiacos, but was eliminated in the first UEFA Cup round against FC Zenit St. Petersburg.

==== 2006 ====
Frode Johnsen started the season well, and halfway through the season he had scored six goals in 13 games before Nagoya Grampus Eight came knocking. Johnsen could not resist the chance of going to play abroad and after serving Rosenborg faithfully for a number of years, they let him go and sold him in July 2006.

In all competitions, Johnsen played 234 games and scored 125 goals for Rosenborg.

=== Nagoya Grampus ===
He signed an 18-month contract and started his Nagoya career by scoring twice in an away match against JEF United Chiba on 29 July 2006. Nagoya won the match 3–2. He scored eight more times finishing with ten goals in 18 games as Nagoya Grampus finished in 7th place.

In his first full season in 2007, Nagoya only managed an 11th place. He scored 13 goals in 26 games.

In 2008, Johnsen and Nagoya fought for the J1 League championship until the final day, but ended up in third place, qualifying for an Asian Champions league spot.

On 28 October 2008, Frode Johnsen stated that he would stay in Japan for at least one more year, either for Nagoya or another Japanese club.

=== Shimizu S-Pulse ===
On 18 November 2008, Frode Johnsen announced that he would be leaving Nagoya after this season, and that he was only a medical away from securing a move to another Japanese club. He did not reveal which club it was until the 2008 season was over. It was eventually known that he would join Shimizu S-Pulse for the 2009 season.

Shimizu S-Pulse finished in 7th place in his first season and five points from an AFC Champions League place, as Johnsen scored nine league goals.

On 1 August Johnsen scored his first hat-trick in the J-League in a 6–3 win against Shonan Bellmare.

On 14 November 2010, Johnsen scored one goal in a 5–0 win against Shonan Bellmare in what will be his last league game in Japan. He has announced that he will return to Norway after this season.

== International career ==
Johnsen won 34 caps and scored 10 goals for the Norwegian national team. He made his debut against Finland on 16 August 2000 coming on for Steffen Iversen 20 minutes from time.

His first international goal came against Wales in a 2002 FIFA World Cup qualifier. He remained a regular member of the Norway squad until 2007, but lost his place after moving to Japan. The long flight distance between Europe and Japan was cited as one of the reasons why he did not play in more games after joining Nagoya Grampus.

On 1 September 2013, Johnsen was recalled to the national team squad, more than six years after his last cap, ahead of the 2014 World Cup qualifying matches against Cyprus and Switzerland. He did not play in either match, but kept his place in the squad for the matches against Slovenia and Iceland in October 2013. In the match against Slovenia on 11 October 2013, Johnsen came on as a late substitute, becoming the oldest player ever to play for the Norwegian national team. He repeated the feat in the home match against Iceland four days later, at the age of 39 years, 212 days.

== Career statistics ==
=== Club ===
Appearances and goals by club, season and competition
Club	Season	League			Cup		Continental		Total	
Club	Season	Division	Apps	Goals	Apps	Goals	Apps	Goals	Apps	Goals
Odd Grenland	1993	Second Division	0	0			–		0	0
Odd Grenland	1994	Second Division	0	0			–		0	0
Odd Grenland	1995	Adeccoligaen	8	0			–		8	0
Odd Grenland	1996	Adeccoligaen	20	3			–		20	3
Odd Grenland	1997	Adeccoligaen	24	2			–		24	2
Odd Grenland	1998	Adeccoligaen	26	7			–		26	7
Odd Grenland	1999	Tippeligaen	25	9	5	2	–		30	11
Odd Grenland	2000	Tippeligaen	10	3			–		10	3
Odd Grenland	Total		113	24	5	2	0	0	118	26
Rosenborg	2000	Tippeligaen	15	9	1	0	12	6	28	15
Rosenborg	2001	Tippeligaen	25	17	3	3	7	1	35	21
Rosenborg	2002	Tippeligaen	17	7	3	0	8	2	28	9
Rosenborg	2003	Tippeligaen	26	15	7	11	9	2	42	28
Rosenborg	2004	Tippeligaen	26	19	5	6	20	7	51	32
Rosenborg	2005	Tippeligaen	23	7	2	4	10	0	35	11
Rosenborg	2006	Tippeligaen	13	6	2	3	–		15	9
Rosenborg	Total		145	80	23	27	66	18	234	125
Nagoya Grampus	2006	J1 League	17	10	2	2	–		19	12
Nagoya Grampus	2007	J1 League	26	13	2	0	2	1	30	14
Nagoya Grampus	2008	J1 League	34	12	3	2	6	2	43	16
Nagoya Grampus	Total		77	35	7	4	8	3	92	42
Shimizu S-Pulse	2009	J1 League	33	9	4	1	8	2	45	12
Shimizu S-Pulse	2010	J1 League	29	8	3	3	8	0	40	11
Shimizu S-Pulse	Total		62	17	7	4	16	2	85	23
Odd	2011	Tippeligaen	23	7	4	1	–		27	8
Odd	2012	Tippeligaen	29	4	3	4	0	0	32	8
Odd	2013	Tippeligaen	30	16	4	2	0	0	34	18
Odd	2014	Tippeligaen	30	11	6	6	0	0	36	17
Odd	2015	Tippeligaen	9	2	4	5	1	1	14	8
Odd	Total		121	40	21	18	1	1	143	59
Career total			518	196	63	55	91	24	672	275

Note: Europe continental also includes Royal League (2004 season)

=== International goals ===
Scores and results list Norway's goal tally first, score column indicates score after each Johnsen goal.

List of international goals scored by Frode Johnsen
No.	Date	Venue	Opponent	Score	Result	Competition
1	24 January 2001	Hong Kong Stadium, Hong Kong	South Korea		3–2	Friendly match
2	24 January 2001	Hong Kong Stadium, Hong Kong	South Korea		3–2	Friendly match
3	5 September 2001	Ullevaal Stadion, Oslo	Wales		3–2	2002 FIFA World Cup qualification
4	18 August 2004	Ullevaal Stadion, Oslo	Belgium		2–2	Friendly match
5	22 January 2004	Hong Kong Stadium, Hong Kong	Sweden		3–0	Friendly match
6	25 January 2004	Hong Kong Stadium, Hong Kong	Honduras		3–1	Friendly match
7	20 April 2005	A. Le Coq Arena, Tallinn	Estonia		2–1	Friendly match
8	24 May 2005	Ullevaal Stadion, Oslo	Costa Rica		1–0	Friendly match
9	24 May 2006	Ullevaal Stadion, Oslo	Paraguay		2–2	Friendly match
10	24 May 2006	Ullevaal Stadion, Oslo	Paraguay		2–2	Friendly match

== Honours ==
Rosenborg

- Norwegian Premier League (6): 2000, 2001, 2002, 2003, 2004, 2006
- Norwegian Football Cup: 2003

Individual

- Tippeligaen Top goalscorer: 2001, 2004, 2013
- Norwegian Football Association Gold Watch
- Norwegian Cup Top goalscorer: 2014
