= Ole Jørgen Halvorsen =

Norwegian footballer (born 1987)

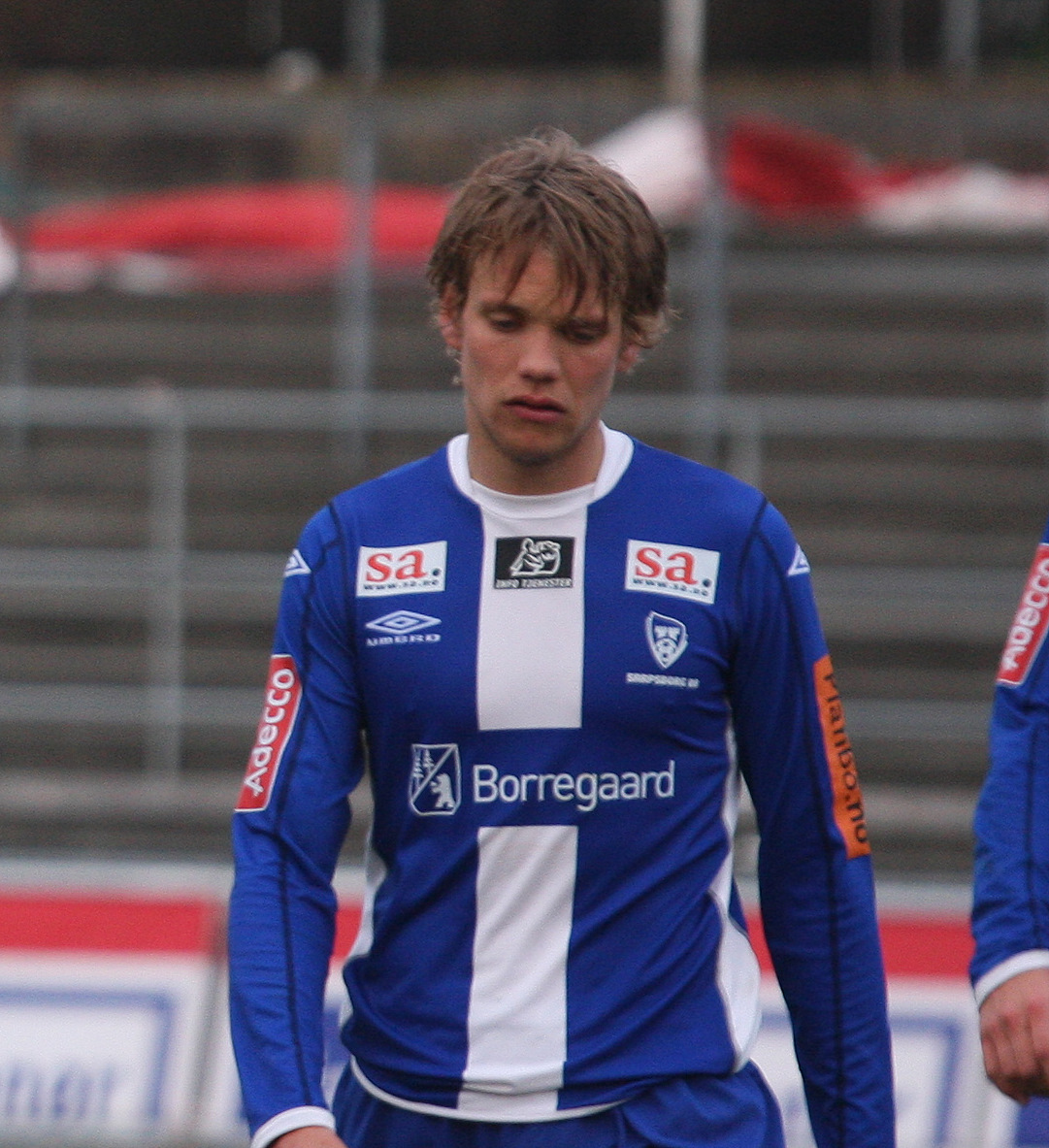
- 2009 by Jarle Vines

Personal information
- Date of birth: 2 October 1987 (age 39)
- Place of birth: Sarpsborg, Norway
- Height: 1.80 m (5 ft 11 in)
- Position: Midfielder

Team information
- Current team: Borgen IL

Senior career*
Years	Team	Apps	(Gls)
2006–2009	Sarpsborg 08	86	(19)
2009–2011	Sogndal	65	(16)
2012–2013	Fredrikstad	43	(7)
2013–2017	Odd	78	(7)
2016	→ Bodø/Glimt (loan)	10	(4)
2017–2022	Sarpsborg 08	157	(17)
2023–	Borgen IL		
- * Club domestic league appearances and goals as of 13 November 2022

Ole Jørgen Halvorsen (born 2 October 1987) is a Norwegian professional footballer who plays as a midfielder for Borgen IL.

== Career ==
Halvorsen played for Sarpsborg 08 before moving to Sogndal in 2009.

Before the 2012 season he signed a contract with Fredrikstad.

In August 2013 he signed a contract with Odd.

On the last day of the Norwegian transfers he signed a loan deal with Bodø/Glimt.

== Career statistics ==
=== Club ===
As of match played 13 November 2022

Appearances and goals by club, season and competition
Club	Season	League			National Cup		Continental		Total	
Club	Season	Division	Apps	Goals	Apps	Goals	Apps	Goals	Apps	Goals
Sarpsborg 08	2006	Adeccoligaen	16	1	0	0	-		16	1
Sarpsborg 08	2007	Adeccoligaen	24	5	0	0	-		24	5
Sarpsborg 08	2008	Adeccoligaen	29	10	1	0	-		30	10
Sarpsborg 08	2009	Adeccoligaen	17	3	0	0	-		17	3
Sarpsborg 08	Total		86	19	1	0	-	-	87	19
Sogndal	2009	Adeccoligaen	11	1	0	0	-		11	1
Sogndal	2010	Adeccoligaen	28	9	5	1	-		33	10
Sogndal	2011	Tippeligaen	26	6	4	4	-		30	10
Sogndal	Total		65	16	9	5	-	-	74	21
Fredrikstad	2012	Tippeligaen	28	5	2	0	-		30	5
Fredrikstad	2013	Adeccoligaen	15	2	2	2	-		17	4
Fredrikstad	Total		43	7	4	2	-	-	47	9
Odd	2013	Tippeligaen	12	0	0	0	-		12	0
Odd	2014	Tippeligaen	26	2	7	5	-		33	7
Odd	2015	Tippeligaen	24	5	3	0	8	2	35	7
Odd	2016	Tippeligaen	16	0	3	3	3	0	22	3
Odd	Total		78	7	13	8	11	2	102	17
Bodø/Glimt (loan)	2016	Tippeligaen	10	4	2	0	-		12	4
Sarpsborg 08	2017	Eliteserien	27	4	5	3	-		32	7
Sarpsborg 08	2018	Eliteserien	24	5	0	0	13	3	37	8
Sarpsborg 08	2019	Eliteserien	27	2	2	0	-		29	2
Sarpsborg 08	2020	Eliteserien	27	5	0	0	-		27	5
Sarpsborg 08	2021	Eliteserien	24	1	2	1	-		26	2
Sarpsborg 08	2022	Eliteserien	28	0	2	1	-		30	1
Sarpsborg 08	Total		157	17	11	5	13	3	180	25
Career total			439	70	40	20	24	5	503	95
