= André Hansen =

Norwegian footballer (born 1989)

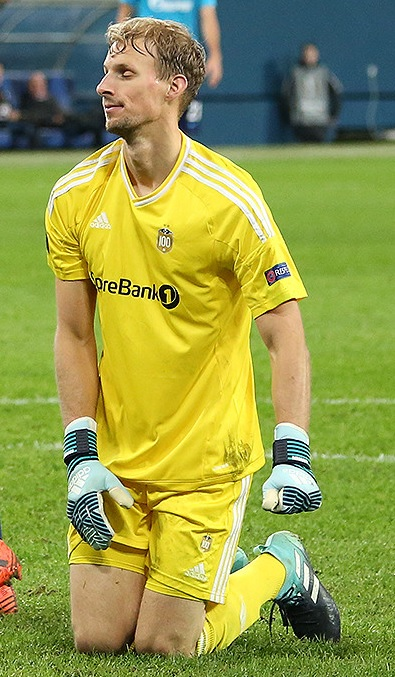
- Hansen with Rosenborg in 2017

Personal information
- Date of birth: 17 December 1989 (age 36)
- Place of birth: Oslo, Norway
- Height: 1.89 m (6 ft 2 in)
- Position: Goalkeeper

Youth career
- –2004: Bjerkealliansen

Senior career*
Years	Team	Apps	(Gls)
2004–2008	Skeid	21	(0)
2007	→ Kjelsås (loan)	7	(0)
2009–2010	Lillestrøm	3	(0)
2009	→ KR Reykjavík (loan)	8	(0)
2011–2014	Odd	111	(0)
2015–2023	Rosenborg	227	(0)
2024–2025	Odd	45	(0)

International career^{‡}
2008–2010	Norway U21	7	(0)
2011	Norway U23	1	(0)
2013–2022	Norway	11	(0)
- * Club domestic league appearances and goals as of 20 January 2026 ‡ National team caps and goals as of 29 March 2022

André Hansen (born 17 December 1989) is a former Norwegian professional footballer who played as a goalkeeper for Odd and Rosenborg. He made his International debut for Norway in 2013.

== Club career ==
He hails from Veitvet, and started his career with Bjerkealliansen. He went from there to Skeid Fotball. In 2007, he was loaned out to Kjelsås Fotball. He was signed by Lillestrøm in 2008, but spent the 2008 season on loan back at Skeid. He made his debut in the Norwegian top division against SK Brann in April 2009, conceding three goals. He conceded another three goals in his second game. In late July 2009 he was loaned out to KR Reykjavík. Hansen was named as Goalkeeper Of The Year in Iceland, and selected for the All-Star Team, despite only playing eight matches. He returned to Lillestrøm SK before the 2010 season.

As Stefan Logi Magnusson was Henning Berg's preferred goalkeeper at Lillestrøm, Hansen primarily played for the reserve team in the Third Division. His contract with the club expired at the end of the 2010 season - and on 8 July 2010 he signed a four-year contract with Odd Grenland, joining the club on 1 January 2011. Hansen stated that he changed club because he had a greater chance to play regularly in the Tippeligaen with Odd. Hansen became Odd's first-choice goalkeeper in his first season with the club, and played all 30 matches.

In the Tippeligaen match against Strømsgodset on 23 May 2012, Hansen was injured as a result of a collision with Péter Kovács sustaining a fracture of the cheek bone which kept him out of action for three weeks.

== International career ==
Hansen has represented Norway from Under-18 to Under-23 level, and was capped 7 times for the Norwegian under-21 team.

In August 2012 Hansen was called up for the senior team for the first time. The next month Hansen was again called up for the senior national team, and goalkeeping coach Frode Grodås stated that Hansen was mainly to be used by the national team as the third-choice goalkeeper behind Rune Jarstein and Espen Bugge Pettersen. Hansen made his debut for the national team on 12 January 2013, when Norway drew 0–0 in a friendly match against Zambia.

== Career statistics ==
=== Club ===
As of match played 1 November 2025

Appearances and goals by club, season and competition
Club	Season	League			National Cup		Europe		Other		Total	
Club	Season	Division	Apps	Goals	Apps	Goals	Apps	Goals	Apps	Goals	Apps	Goals
Lillestrøm	2009	Tippeligaen	2	0	1	0	–		–		3	0
Lillestrøm	2010	Tippeligaen	1	0	0	0	–		–		1	0
Lillestrøm	Total		3	0	1	0	0	0	0	0	4	0
KR Reykjavík (loan)	2009	Pepsi deildin	8	0	1	0	–		–		9	0
Odd	2011	Tippeligaen	30	0	3	0	–		–		33	0
Odd	2012	Tippeligaen	29	0	1	0	–		–		30	0
Odd	2013	Tippeligaen	23	0	3	0	–		–		26	0
Odd	2014	Tippeligaen	29	0	6	0	–		–		35	0
Odd	Total		111	0	13	0	0	0	0	0	124	0
Rosenborg	2015	Tippeligaen	28	0	5	0	12	0	–		45	0
Rosenborg	2016	Tippeligaen	19	0	3	0	–		–		22	0
Rosenborg	2017	Eliteserien	25	0	0	0	12	0	1	0	38	0
Rosenborg	2018	Eliteserien	29	0	3	0	14	0	–		46	0
Rosenborg	2019	Eliteserien	29	0	2	0	13	0	–		44	0
Rosenborg	2020	Eliteserien	19	0	0	0	3	0	–		22	0
Rosenborg	2021	Eliteserien	26	0	3	0	6	0	–		35	0
Rosenborg	2022	Eliteserien	30	0	1	0	0	0	–		31	0
Rosenborg	2023	Eliteserien	22	0	0	0	4	0	–		26	0
Rosenborg	Total		227	0	17	0	64	0	1	0	309	0
Odd	2024	Eliteserien	17	0	0	0	–		–		17	0
Odd	2025	OBOS-ligaen	28	0	2	0	–		–		30	0
Odd	Total		45	0	2	0	0	0	0	0	47	0
Career total			394	0	34	0	64	0	1	0	493	0

=== International ===
As of 29 March 2022

Appearances and goals by national team and year
National team	Year	Apps	Goals
Norway	2013	2	0
Norway	2014	0	0
Norway	2015	0	0
Norway	2016	1	0
Norway	2017	0	0
Norway	2018	0	0
Norway	2019	1	0
Norway	2020	1	0
Norway	2021	5	0
Norway	2022	1	0
Total		11	0

== Honours ==
Rosenborg

- Tippeligaen/Eliteserien: 2015, 2016, 2017, 2018
- Norwegian Cup: 2015, 2016, 2018
- Mesterfinalen: 2017, 2018

Individual

- Eliteserien Player of the Year: 2018
