= List of Rosenborg BK records and statistics =

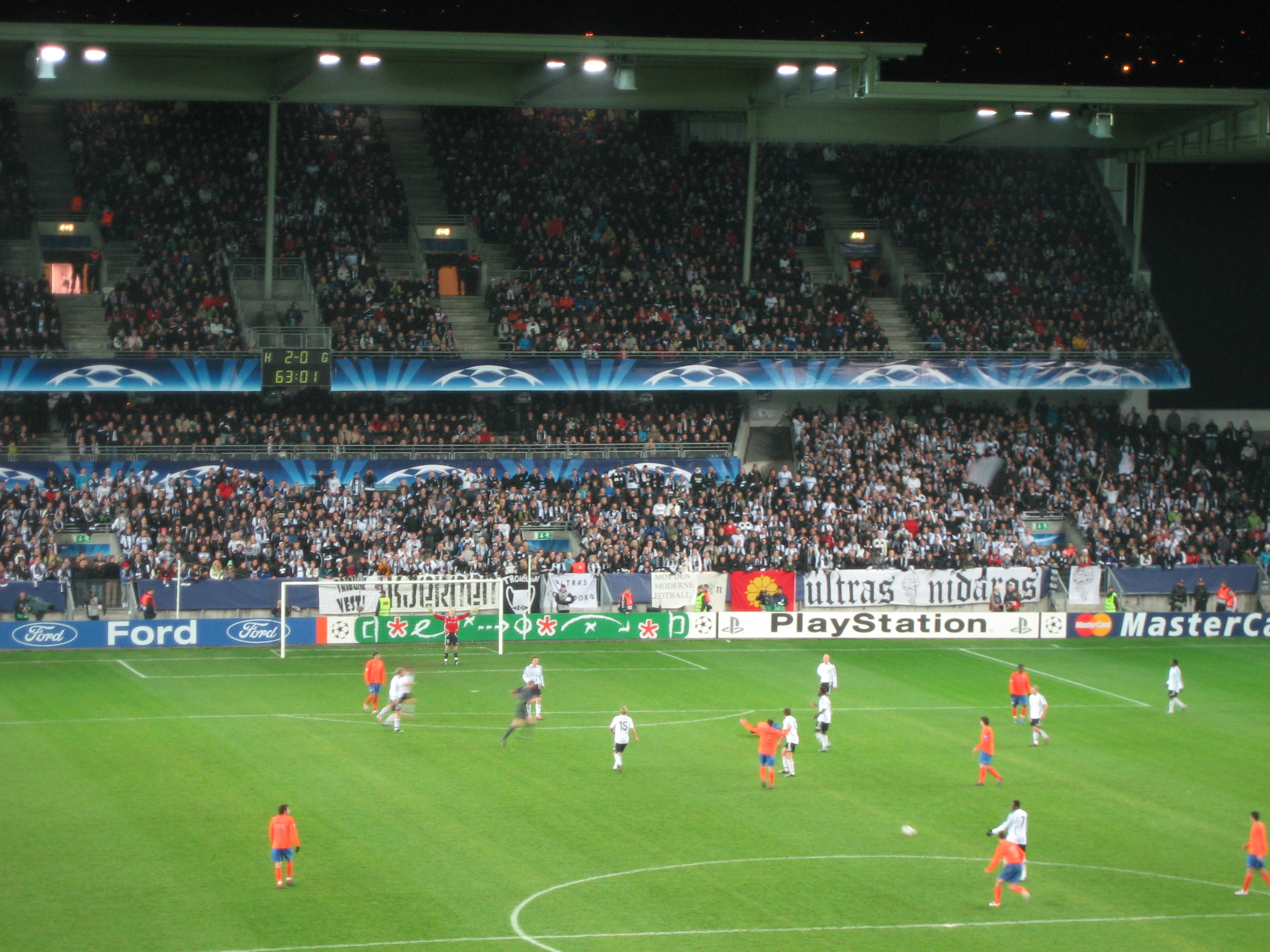
Rosenborg playing Valencia at Lerkendal Stadion in the 2007–08 UEFA Champions League

Rosenborg Ballklub is an association football club based in Trondheim, Norway. It is Norway's most successful club, having won the Norwegian Premier League 26 times and the Norwegian Football Cup 12 times. Although founded in 1917, it was not permitted to play Football Association of Norway-sanctioned matches until 1928. The club entered the cup for the first time in 1932, claiming its first title in 1960. Rosenborg joined the top league in 1967 and won the league in the club's inaugural top tier season. It has only spent one season outside the top tier since, which was in 1978. Rosenborg has played 186 matches and 27 seasons in Union of European Football Associations (UEFA) tournaments, starting with the 1965–66 European Cup Winners' Cup. Their only European trophy is the 2008 UEFA Intertoto Cup, with the second-best performance being the quarter-finals of the 1996–97 UEFA Champions League.

The club's record win is 17–0 in a cup match against Buvik in 2003; the league record is 10–0 against Brann in 1996 and the Champions League record is 6–0 against Helsingborg in 2000. In the league, the team had a record 87–20 goal difference in 1997, claimed a record 69 points in 2009 and went undefeated in 2010. Rosenborg was relegated after the 1977 season having won just a single match. The record home attendance is 28,569 spectators at Lerkendal Stadion against Lillestrøm in 1985.

Roar Strand, who played 21 seasons between 1989 and 2010, has played 416 league matches, more than any other Rosenborg player. He has also won the most titles with the club, having won the league 16 times and the cup 5 times. With 151 league goals, Harald Martin Brattbakk is the club's all-time top scorer and was the league's top scorer during six seasons. Sigurd Rushfeldt is the league's all-time top scorer, although he scored a majority of these for Tromsø. Odd Iversen holds the record for most goals in a single match and season, with 6 and 30 respectively. The club received it highest transfer fee for John Carew; they received 75 million Norwegian krone when he was sold to Valencia in 2000.

== Honors ==
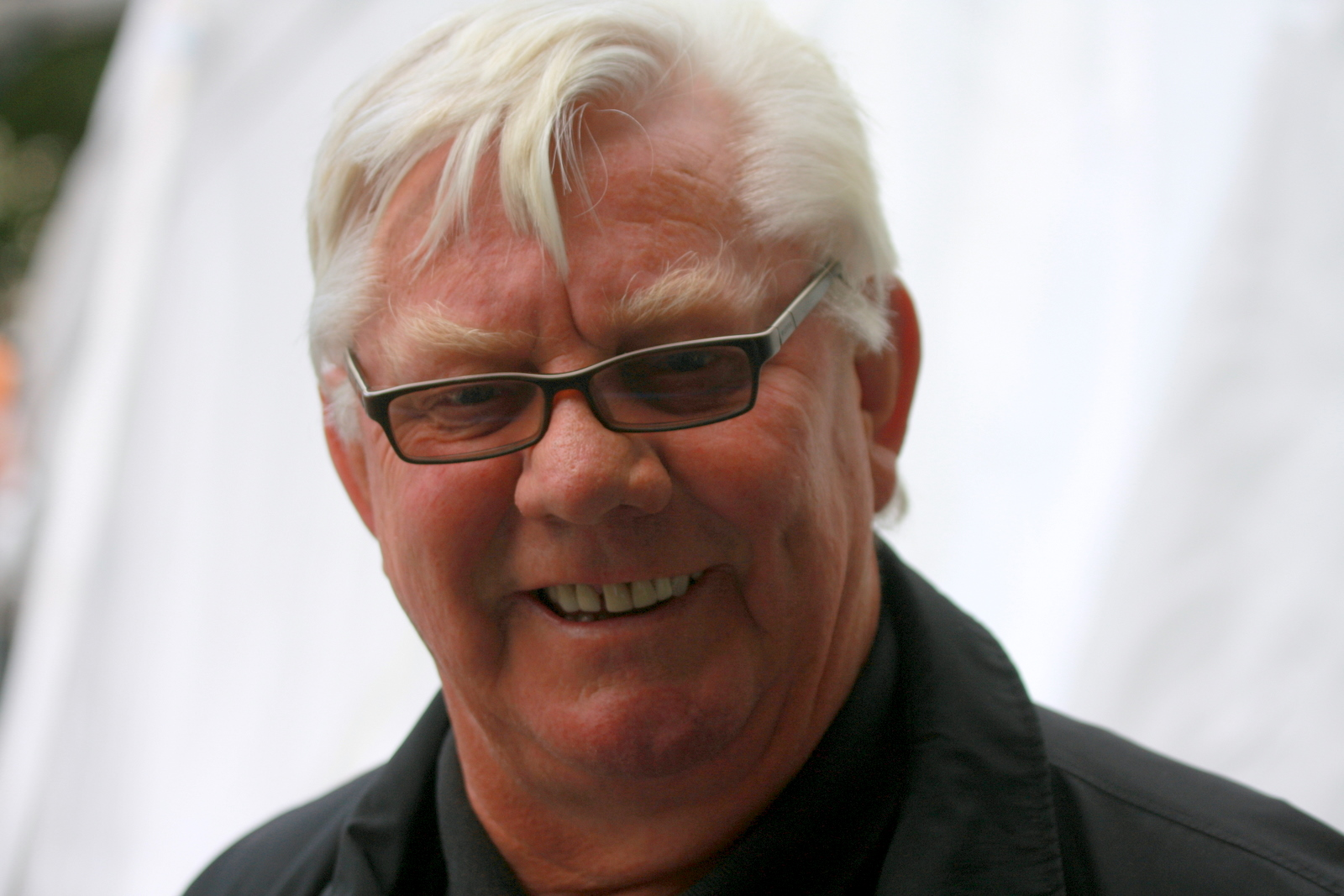
Nils Arne Eggen has managed the club to more trophies than any other manager.

=== Major ===
1. divisjon / Norwegian Premier League:

Winners (26): 1967, 1969, 1971, 1985, 1988, 1990, 1992, 1993, 1994, 1995, 1996, 1997, 1998, 1999, 2000, 2001, 2002, 2003, 2004, 2006, 2009, 2010, 2015, 2016, 2017, 2018
Runners-up (7): 1968, 1970, 1973, 1989, 1991, 2013, 2014

Norwegian Football Cup:

Winners (12): 1960, 1964, 1971, 1988, 1990, 1992, 1995, 1999, 2003, 2015, 2016, 2018
Runners-up (6): 1967, 1972, 1973, 1991, 1998, 2013

Superfinalen:

Winners (1): 2010

Mesterfinalen:

Winners (2): 2017, 2018

Intertoto Cup:

Co-winner (1): 2008 (Note: Rosenborg was one of 11 teams to advance to the 2008–09 UEFA Cup by winning all their stages of the 2008 UEFA Intertoto Cup. Brage advanced the furthest in the UEFA Cup and was declared the overall winner.)

=== Minor ===
Minor honors include lower-division league titles and pre-season friendly tournaments.

The double:

Winners (9): 1971, 1988, 1990, 1992, 1995, 1999, 2003, 2015, 2016, 2018

League of Norway District VIII:

Winners (1): 1938–39

Trøndelag Class A:

Winners (1): 1945
Runners-up (1): 1935, 1936

Third Division:

Winners (4): 1948–49, 1953–54, 1956–57, 1958–59
Runners-up (1): 1952–53

Second Division:

Winners (3): 1959–60, 1966, 1978
Runners-up (1): 1965

La Manga Cup:

Winners (3): 1999, 2001, 2003
Runners-up (1): 2000

Trofeo Santiago Bernabéu:

Runners-up (1): 2009

Kniksen's Honor Award:

Winners (1): 1997

== Players ==
=== Appearances ===
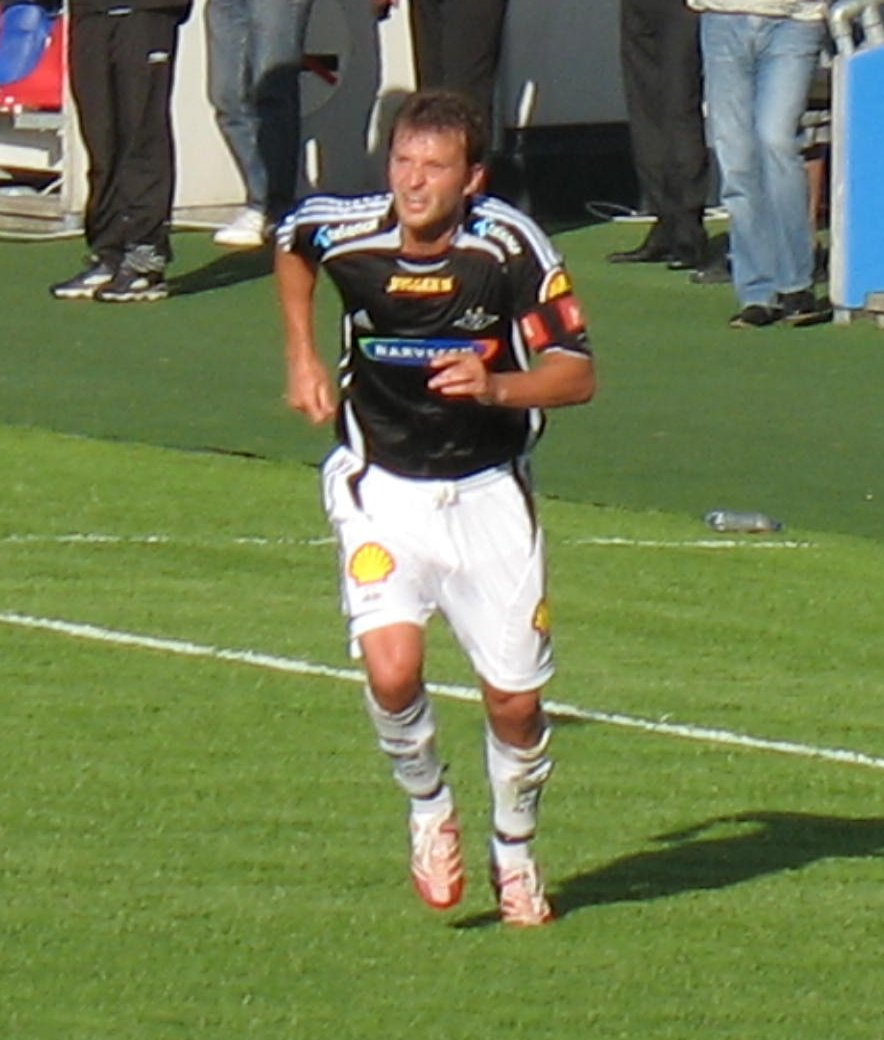
Roar Strand played 416 league matches between 1989 and 2010.

The following is a list of the ten Rosenborg players with the most appearances in the top league, including their appearances in European football. As no comprehensive statistics for cup appearances exists, the numbers are not included in the total.

Player	Years	League	Europe	Total
Roar Strand	1989–92, 1994–2010	416	146	562
Ola By Rise	1977–95	346	24	370
Erik Hoftun	1994–2005	279	103	382
Bent Skammelsrud	1991–97, 1998–2002	272	85	357
Jan Hansen	1975–88	234	1	235
Sverre Brandhaug	1981–91	225	8	233
Christer Basma	1998–2008	225	87	312
Harald Brattbakk	1990–91, 1994–97, 2001–05	223	71	294
Knut Torbjørn Eggen	1979–91	221	9	230
Karl Petter Løken	1985–96	216	28	246

=== Seasons ===
Player	Years	Seasons
Roar Strand	1989–92, 1994–2010	21
Kåre Rønnes	1956–74	19
Ola By Rise	1977–95	19
Sverre Fornes	1948–65	17
Knut Torbjørn Eggen	1979–91	14
Jan Hansen	1975–88	14
Ståle Stensaas	1992–97, 2000–06	13
Odd Iversen	1964–69, 1973–75, 1980–82	12
Øystein Wormdal	1971–74, 1976–83	12
Karl Petter Løken	1985–96	12
Bjørn Otto Bragstad	1989–2000	12
Bent Skammelsrud	1991–97, 1998–2002	12
Harald Brattbakk	1990–91, 1994–97, 2001–05	12
Erik Hoftun	1994–2005	12

=== Goalscorers ===
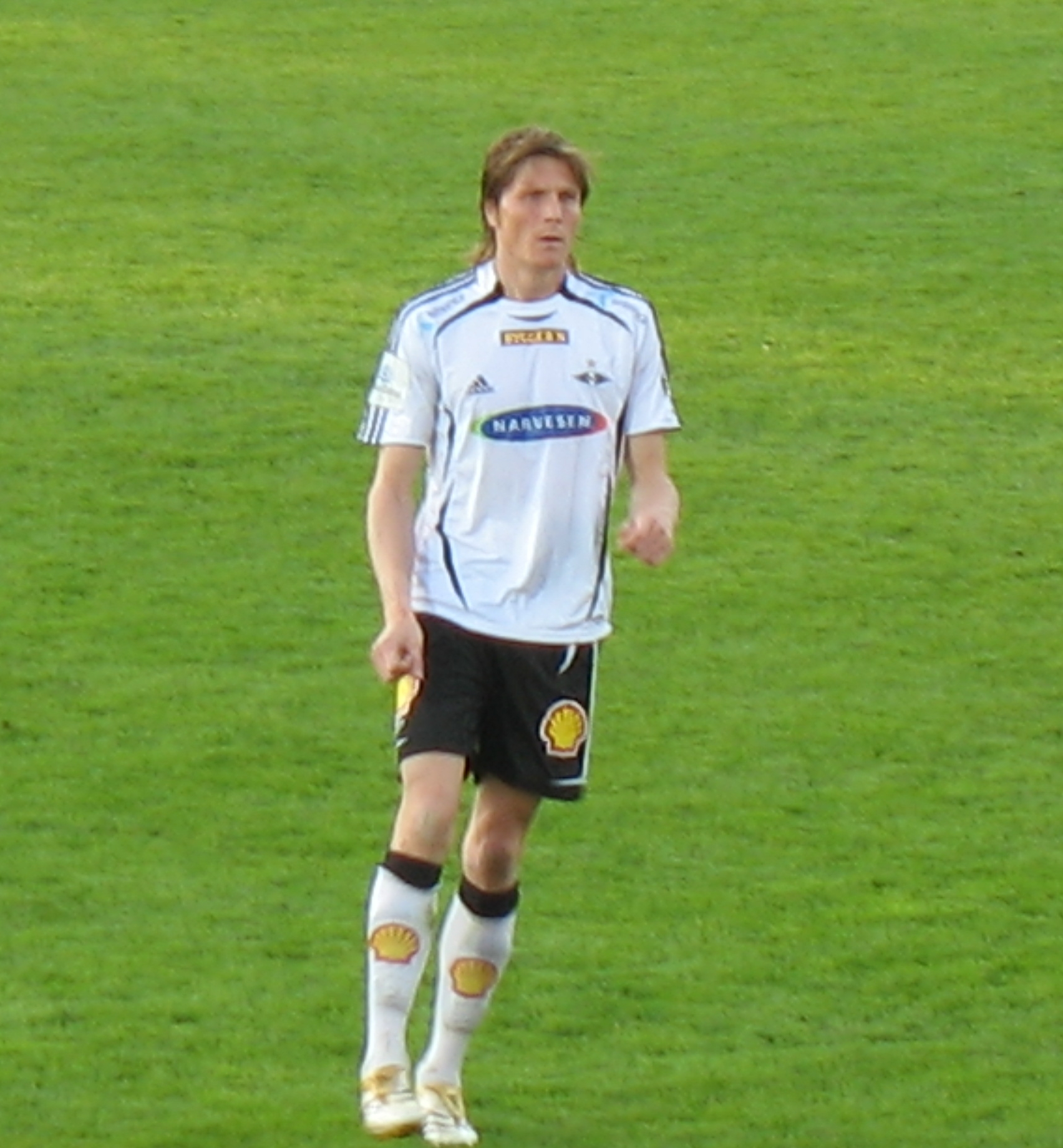
Frode Johnsen became the league's top scorer in 2001 and 2004.

- Most goals scored in one season: 30 – Odd Iversen in 1968
- Most goals scored in one game: 6 – Odd Iversen against Vålerengen on 20 October 1968
- Sigurd Rushfeldt is the all-time top scorer in the Norwegian Premier League, with 172 goals. Also the next three places on the list consist of Rosenborg players: Harald Brattbakk (166 goals), Petter Belsvik (159 goals) and Odd Iversen (158 goals). All four have played for multiple top-league clubs.

The following is a list of the ten Rosenborg players who have scored the most top-league goals. It includes their career total for Rosenborg, as well as the years they were top scorer in the club. An asterisk (*) indicates that they were also top scorer in the league for that season. The list also contains the players' goals in European football. As no comprehensive statistics for cup appearances exists, the numbers are not included in the total.

Player	League	Europe	Total	Years
Harald Brattbakk	151	30	181	1994*, 1995*, 1996*, 2002*, 2003*
Odd Iversen	123	7	130	1967*, 1968*, 1969*, 1973, 1974, 1975, 1981
Mini Jakobsen	98	9	107	1989*, 1990
Sverre Brandhaug	84	1	85	1982, 1984*, 1986, 1988
Frode Johnsen	80	18	98	2000, 2001*, 2004*
Roar Strand	79	21	100	—
Gøran Sørloth	74	4	78	1985, 1993
Sigurd Rushfeldt	73	13	86	1997*, 1998*, 1999
Steffen Iversen	67	16	83	2006, 2007, 2008
Karl Petter Løken	64	9	73	1991*

=== Most-winning ===
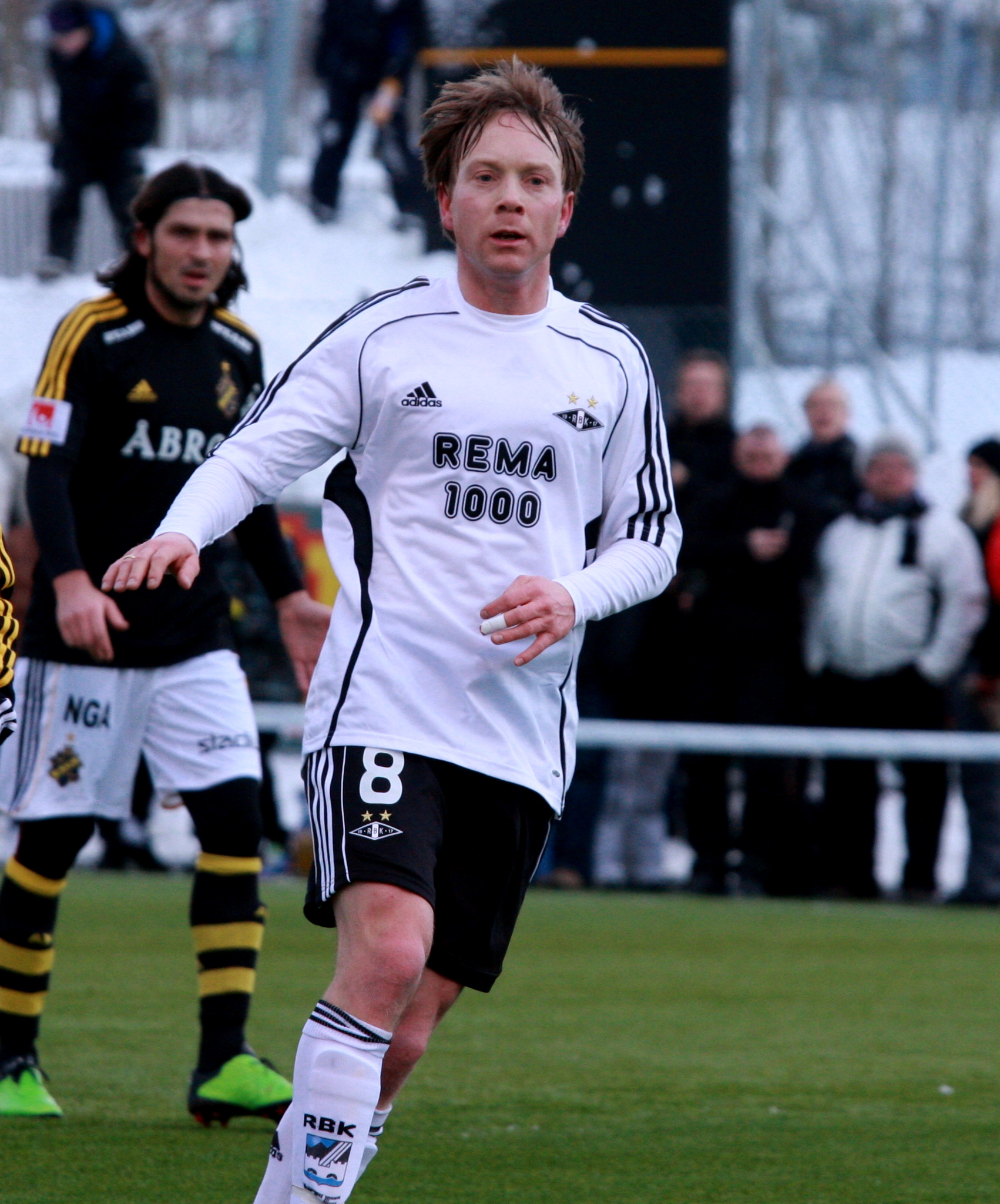
Fredrik Winsnes has won eight league and two cup titles with Rosenborg.

The following is a list of the most-winning players with Rosenborg. It contains the number of times the player has won the league and cup with the club, as well as the years.

Player	Total	League		Cup	
Player	Total	No.	Years	No.	Years
Roar Strand	21	16	1990, 1992, 1994, 1995, 1996, 1997, 1998, 1999, 2000, 2001, 2002, 2003, 2004, 2006, 2009, 2010	5	1990, 1992, 1995, 1999, 2003
Bent Skammelsrud	14	11	1992, 1993, 1994, 1995, 1996, 1997, 1998, 1999, 2000, 2001, 2002	3	1992, 1995, 1999
Erik Hoftun	14	11	1994, 1995, 1996, 1997, 1998, 1999, 2000, 2001, 2002, 2003, 2004	3	1995, 1999, 2003
Bjørn Otto Bragstad	13	10	1990, 1992, 1993, 1994, 1995, 1997, 1998, 1999, 2000, 2001	3	1992, 1995, 1999
Ørjan Berg	12	8	1988, 1990, 2000, 2001, 2002, 2003, 2004, 2006	4	1988, 1990, 1999, 2003
Mini Jakobsen	11	7	1988, 1990, 1995, 1996, 1997, 1998, 1999	4	1988, 1990, 1995, 1999
Karl Petter Løken	11	7	1988, 1990, 1992, 1993, 1994, 1995, 1996	4	1988, 1990, 1992, 1995
Ola By Rise	11	7	1985, 1988, 1990. 1992, 1993, 1994, 1995	4	1988, 1990, 1992, 1995
Ståle Stensaas	11	9	1994, 1995, 1996, 2000, 2001, 2002, 2003, 2004, 2006	2	1995, 2003
Christer Basma	10	8	1998, 1999, 2000, 2001, 2002, 2003, 2004, 2006	2	1999, 2003
Harald Brattbakk	10	8	1994, 1995, 1996, 1997, 2001, 2002, 2003, 2004	2	1995, 2003
Fredrik Winsnes	10	8	1997, 1998, 1999, 2000, 2001, 2003, 2004, 2010	2	1999, 2003

=== Transfer fee records ===
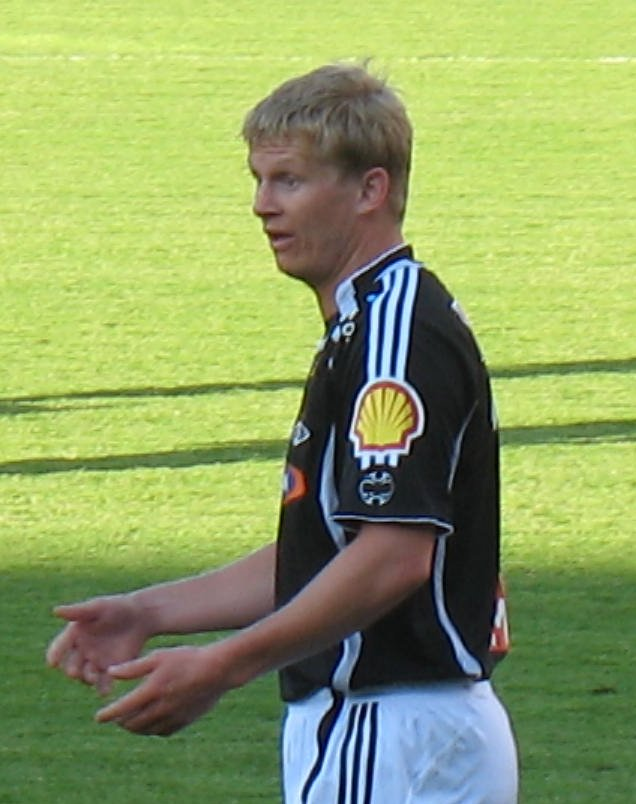
Steffen Iversen was sold to Tottenham Hotspur for NOK 28 million in 1996.

The following lists the ten highest transfer fees received by Rosenborg for players sold. It lists the player, the price in million Norwegian krone, the year the transfer took place, the club which bought the player and the country of that club.

Player	Price	Year	Club	Country
John Carew	75	2000	Valencia	Spain
Ole Selnæs	47	2016	Saint-Étienne	France
Vegard Heggem	44	1998	Liverpool	England
Alexander Tettey	40	2009	Rennes	France
Sigurd Rushfeldt	30	1999	Racing Santander	Spain
Steffen Iversen	28	1996	Tottenham Hotspur	England
André Bergdølmo	25	2000	Ajax	Netherlands
Harald Martin Brattbakk	23	1997	Celtic	Scotland
Fredrik Stoor	22	2008	Fulham	England
Anthony Annan	21	2011	Schalke 04	Germany

== Club ==
=== Matches ===
- First match: 2–1 against Falk in mid-July 1918
- First Football Association of Norway sanctioned match: 1928
- First cup match: 0–2 against Kristiansund FK in 1932
- First UEFA match: 3–1 against KR Reykjavík at KR-völlur on 24 August 1965 in the UEFA Cup Winners' Cup

Record wins

- League: 10–0 against Brann on 5 May 1996
- League away:
  - 7–0 against Strømsgodset on 24 July 1994
  - 7–0 against Sogndal on 3 August 1997
- Cup: 17–0 against Buvik on 17 May 2003
- Europe:
  - 7–1 against Astana on 8 August 2007

Record defeats

- Overall: 1–9 against Hibernian on 2 October 1974
- League: 1–8 against Viking on 12 August 1984
- Cup: 0–5 against Molde on 9 August 2009
- Europe: 1–9 against Hibernian on 2 October 1974

Streaks

- Longest winning streak in league: 8 matches in 1995, 1999, 2001, 2006 and 2009
- Longest unbeaten run in league: 33 matches from 18 October 2009 to 7 November 2010
- Longest unbeaten run home in league: 44 matches from 16 October 1994 to 16 May 1998
- Longest unbeaten run away in league: 30 matches from 23 March 2009 to 31 October 2010
- Longest winning streak from season start in league: 7 matches in 2003

Wins/draws/losses in a season

- Most wins in a league season: 20 in 1998 and 2009
- Most draws in a league season: 11 in 2010
- Most defeats in a league season: 16 in 1977
- Fewest wins in a league season: 1 in 1932, 1951–52 and 1977
- Fewest draws in a league season: 0 in 1929, 1930, 1931, 1932, 1933, 1937 and 1937–38
- Fewest draws in a top-league season: 1 in 1969
- Fewest defeats in a league season: 0 in 2010
- Most points in a league season: 69 points in 2009
- Fewest points in a league season: 2 points in 4 matches in 1932
- Fewest points in a top-league season: 12 points in 22 matches in 1977
- Highest league win margin: 15 points in 1995, ahead of Molde

=== Goals ===
- Most league goals scored in a season: 87 in 1997
- Fewest league goals scored in a top league season: 15 in 1970
- Fewest league goals conceded in a season: 1 in 1945
- Fewest league goals conceded in a top-league season: 5 in 1970
- Most league goals conceded in a season: 60 in 1961–62
- Best goal difference in a league season: 87–20 in 1997
- Worst goal difference in a league season: 17–48 in 1977

=== In European football ===
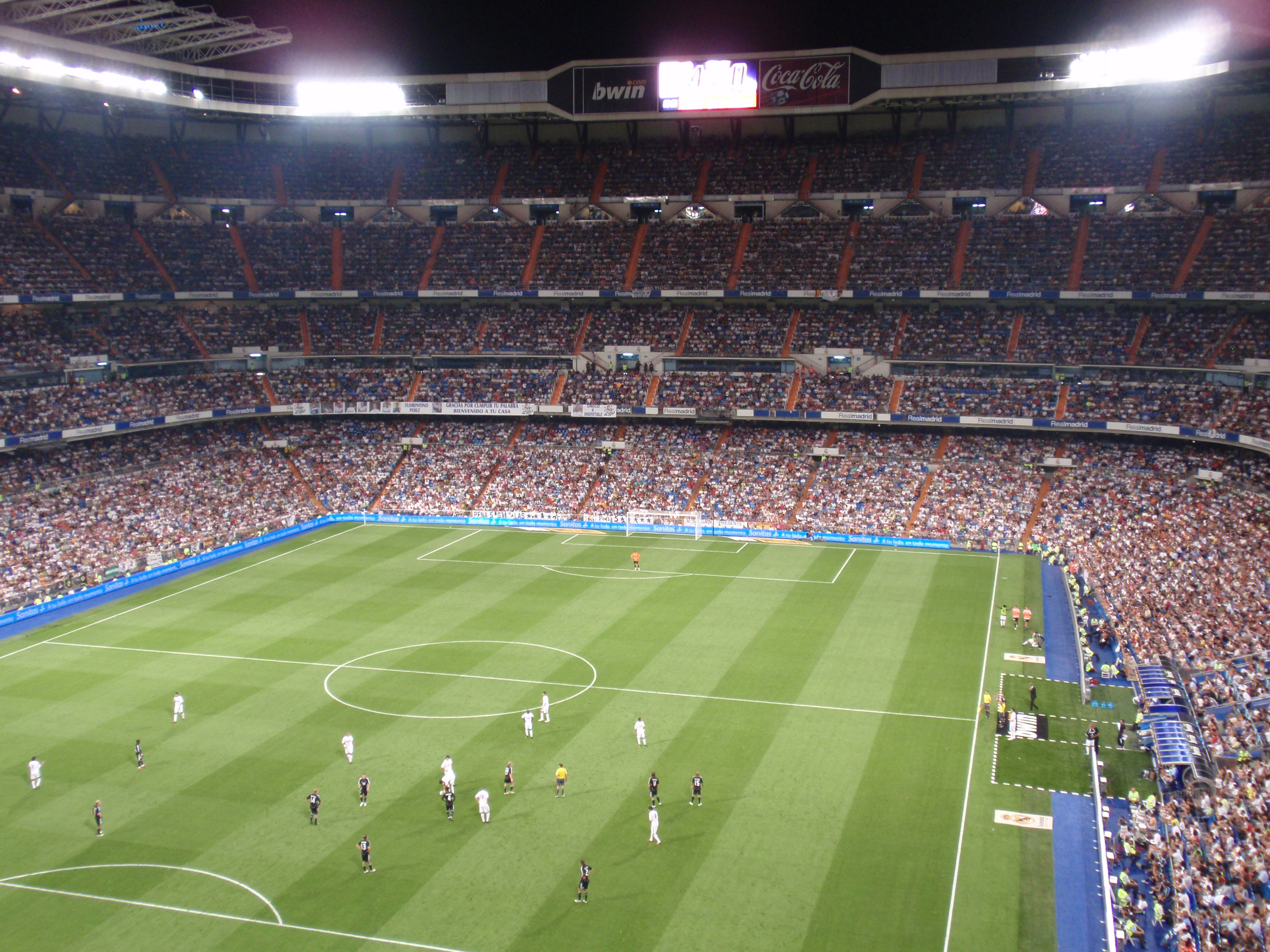
Rosenborg playing Real Madrid in the XXXI Trofeo Santiago Bernabéu at Estadio Santiago Bernabéu in 2009

The following is a list of the all-time statistics from Rosenborg's games in the four UEFA tournaments it has participated in, as well as the overall total. The list contains the tournament, the number of seasons (S), games played (P), won (W), drawn (D) and lost (L). The statistics include qualification matches.

Tournament	S	P	W	D	L
Champions League / European Cup	20	128	48	27	53
Europa League / UEFA Cup / Inter-Cities Fairs Cup	12	44	18	5	21
Cup Winners' Cup	1	4	2	0	2
Intertoto Cup	1	4	3	0	1
Total	29	180	71	32	77

=== Attendance ===
Attendance statistics only take into account statistics from the 1967 season onwards.

- Home overall: 28,569 against Lillestrøm on 12 October 1985
- League: 28,569 against Lillestrøm on 12 October 1985
- League as all-seater: 22,330 against Odd Grenland on 16 May 2006
- League low: 1,250 against Hødd in 1978
- League season average: 19,903 in 2007
- League season average low: 2,549 in 1978
- League away: 24,894 against Vålerenga at Ullevaal Stadion on 23 October 2005
- Cup: 27,497 against Kongsvinger on 16 September 1990
- Cup Final: 31,135 against Odd Grenland at Ullevaal Stadion on 23 October 1960
- Europe: 22,492 against Rapid Wien on 18 September 1968
- Europe as all-seater: 21,582 against Chelsea on 28 November 2007
- Europe away: 64,870 against Real Madrid on 9 October 2005

== Bibliography ==
- Svardal, Geir (2007). Historien om Rosenborg Ballklub 1917–2007 (in Norwegian). Trondheim: Tapir Akademosk Forlag. ISBN 978-82-519-2188-6.
