= Erik Hoftun =

Norwegian footballer (born 1969)

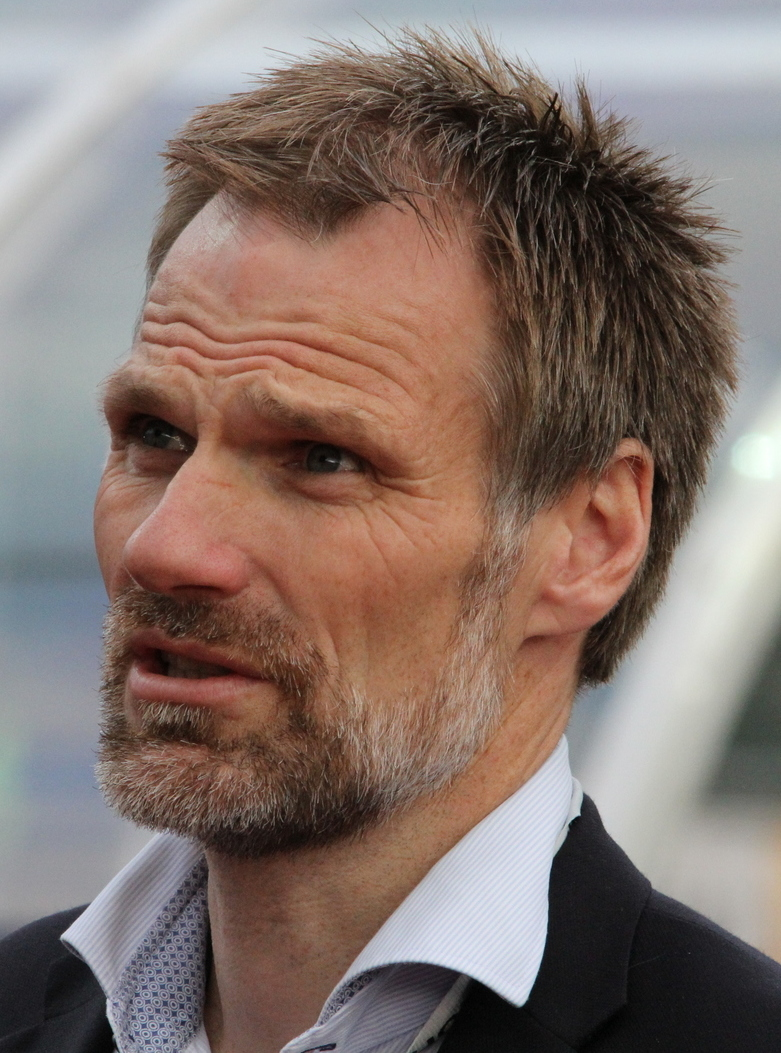
- Hoftun in 2013

Personal information
- Date of birth: 3 March 1969 (age 57)
- Place of birth: Kyrksæterøra, Norway
- Height: 1.86 m (6 ft 1 in)
- Positions: Centre-back; sweeper

Youth career
- KIL/Hemne

Senior career*
Years	Team	Apps	(Gls)
1987–1992	KIL/Hemne	141	(18)
1992–1993	Molde	44	(5)
1994–2005	Rosenborg	279	(14)
2005–2007	Bodø/Glimt	56	(2)
Total		520	(39)

International career
1997–2002	Norway	30	(0)

Managerial career
- 2014–2018: Rosenborg (assistant)
- * Club domestic league appearances and goals

Erik Hoftun (born 3 March 1969) is a Norwegian former professional footballer who primarily played as a centre-back. He played for several clubs in Norway, most notably spending many years with Rosenborg, where he established himself as a key defender. He also represented the Norway national football team at international level.

== Club career ==
Born in Kyrksæterøra, Hoftun began his playing career with KIL/Hemne before moving to Molde in 1992. After spending two seasons at Molde, he joined Rosenborg in 1994.

At Rosenborg, Hoftun spent 11 years and established himself as a key defender during the club's most successful period. He won 11 league titles and three Norwegian Cup titles, and was an important player for Rosenborg not only in the Norwegian league but also in the UEFA Champions League. He made a total of 82 appearances in the Champions League.

During his peak, Hoftun was regarded as a centre-back with excellent anticipation and attacking ability. He was particularly noted for his ability to read the game and anticipate opponents' movements, while he compensated for his lack of pace with extensive experience and a strong understanding of the game.

In 2005, Hoftun moved to Bodø/Glimt. On 24 June 2007, while playing for Bodø/Glimt, he suffered a cardiac arrest after being struck in the chest by an opposing player's knee during a challenge. The club doctor immediately rushed onto the pitch and administered emergency treatment, and the prompt response was credited with saving Hoftun's life. Hoftun remained with Bodø/Glimt until 2007 and retired from professional football that same year.

In November 2007, Hoftun returned to Rosenborg to take on administrative duties. After Knut Torbjørn Eggen resigned, he served as acting sporting director before being formally appointed sporting director of Rosenborg on 18 August 2008.

== International career ==
Hoftun was first called up to the Norway national team in 1997 and remained with the national team until 2002. He made a total of 30 appearances and scored no goals.

Hoftun was included in Norway's 22-man squad for the 1998 FIFA World Cup. Norway drew 2–2 with Morocco in the group stage and 1–1 with Scotland, before defeating Brazil 2–1 in their final group-stage match to advance to the round of 16. However, Hoftun did not make an appearance in the tournament.

Hoftun made his highest number of international appearances in 1999, with 11 matches. He made seven appearances in 1998, four each in 2000 and 2001, and two each in 1997 and 2002. He ended his international career after the 2002 season.

Hoftun did not score during his international career, with all 30 of his international appearances coming between 1997 and 2002.

== Honours ==
Rosenborg

- Norwegian top division: 1994, 1995, 1996, 1997, 1998, 1999, 2000, 2001, 2002, 2003, 2004
- Norwegian Cup: 1995, 1999, 2003

Individual

- Kniksen award as defender of the year: 1995, 1996, 1997, 1998, 1999, 2000
