= Frode Olsen =

Norwegian footballer (born 1967)

Personal information
- Full name: Frode Olsen
- Date of birth: 12 October 1967 (age 59)
- Place of birth: Stavanger, Norway
- Height: 1.87 m (6 ft 2 in)
- Position: Goalkeeper

Youth career
- FK Vidar

Senior career*
Years	Team	Apps	(Gls)
1990	Rosenborg	1	(0)
1991	Strømsgodset	22	(0)
1992–1996	IK Start	117	(0)
1997–1999	Stabæk	76	(0)
2000–2002	Sevilla	33	(0)
2002–2004	Viking	57	(0)
Total		306	(0)

International career
1995–2003	Norway	26	(0)

Managerial career
- Klepp IL (women)
- Bryne FK (sports director)
- * Club domestic league appearances and goals

Frode Olsen (born 12 October 1967) is a Norwegian former professional footballer who played as a goalkeeper. He earned 26 international caps for the Norway national team.

During his career he played for clubs like Viking F.K., Stabæk IF, IK Start and Sevilla FC. He won the Kniksen award as goalie of the year three years in a row from 1997 to 1999.

== Career ==
After retirement, he coached the Klepp IL women's team, then he commentated Spanish football on the Norwegian TV channel TV 2. After TV 2 lost the broadcasting contract for Spanish football, he began working as a studio analyst covering Tippeligaen. While being employed at TV 2, he was the sports director of Bryne FK between January and September 2008.

His favorite English team is Luton Town.

He has also qualified as a referee, officiating on games in Youth Football local to Stavanger from May 2011.
