= Bent Skammelsrud =

Norwegian footballer (born 1966)

Personal information
- Full name: Bent André Skammelsrud
- Date of birth: 18 May 1966 (age 60)
- Place of birth: Sarpsborg, Norway
- Height: 1.77 m (5 ft 10 in)
- Position: Midfielder

Youth career
- Rakkestad IF

Senior career*
Years	Team	Apps	(Gls)
1987–1989	Drøbak/Frogn	43	(7)
1989–1990	Frigg	23	(3)
1990–1991	Malmö FF	20	(2)
1991–1997	Rosenborg	152	(33)
1998	Bayer Leverkusen	8	(0)
1998–2002	Rosenborg	120	(23)
Total		366	(68)

International career
1987–1989	Norway U-21	5	(1)
1987–2000	Norway	38	(7)
- * Club domestic league appearances and goals

Bent André Skammelsrud (born 18 May 1966) is a Norwegian former professional footballer, most known as an important midfielder for Rosenborg BK. He has eleven consecutive championships in the Norwegian Premier League, and three times he won the Norwegian Football Cup.

== Biography ==
Skammelsrud was born in Sarpsborg. He played 272 matches for Rosenborg BK in the Norwegian Premier League, scoring 57 goals. Before joining Rosenborg, he had played for Drøbak/Frogn, Frigg, and the Swedish club Malmö FF. He also played 38 matches for the Norwegian national team, scoring seven goals. He was in roster for Euro 2000.

Except from his debut season in 1991, Skammelsrud won the Norwegian Premier League every season as a Rosenborg player. He was captain of the team for several seasons and a key player in the club's UEFA Champions League matches during the last half of the 1990s. He joined Bayer Leverkusen in January 1998, but returned to Rosenborg only five months later because of family reasons.

Skammelsrud retired after the 2002 season, unwillingly, after Åge Hareide didn't renew his contract with the club.

== Honours ==
=== Club ===
Rosenborg

- Norwegian Premier League Championship (11): 1992, 1993, 1994, 1995, 1996, 1997, 1998, 1999, 2000, 2001, 2002
- Norwegian Football Cup Win: 1992, 1995, 1999

=== Individual ===
- Kniksen award as midfielder of the year in 1997
- Kniksen's honour award in 2001 (together with Roar Strand)
