= Kniksen Award =

Norwegian football award

- Native name: Kniksenprisen
- Description: Annual award honoring the best football players and coaches in the Norwegian football premiership
- Country: Norway
- Presented by: Norsk Toppfotball

The Kniksen Award (Norwegian: Kniksenprisen), established in 1990, honors the best players in the Norwegian football premiership. The award is named after the legendary Norwegian football player Roald Jensen, nicknamed "Kniksen".

== Categories ==
=== Category A ===
A jury composed of players, leaders, coaches and officials in the Tippeligaen, nominates and choose the winners in each category. All the nominees must play in the Norwegian top division. The player's nationality does not matter. The categories are:

- Goalkeeper of the Year
- Defender of the Year
- Midfielder of the Year
- Striker of the Year
- Coach of the Year
- Referee of the Year

In 2006, two further categories were also awarded: Young player of the year, and 1. divisjon player of the year.

=== Category B (the main awards) ===
==== Kniksen of the Year ====
This is awarded to the best Norwegian player of the year. The Kniksen of the year award was replaced by "Gullballen" (English: The Golden Ball) in 2014. The player can play abroad or in Norway and can be won by both female and male players.

==== Kniksen's honour award ====
The Kniksen's honour award is awarded to a person or a team, who have made a great contribution to Norwegian football. This award can be considered a lifetime achievement award, and is recognized as Norwegian football's most prestigious award. The Kniksen's honour award was not awarded in 2005 or 2006, but was resumed in 2007.

The main awards were presented annually at Idrettsgallaen at Hamar in January, but in 2007, all Kniksen awards were presented at a separate award show in November.

== Winners ==
=== 1990s ===
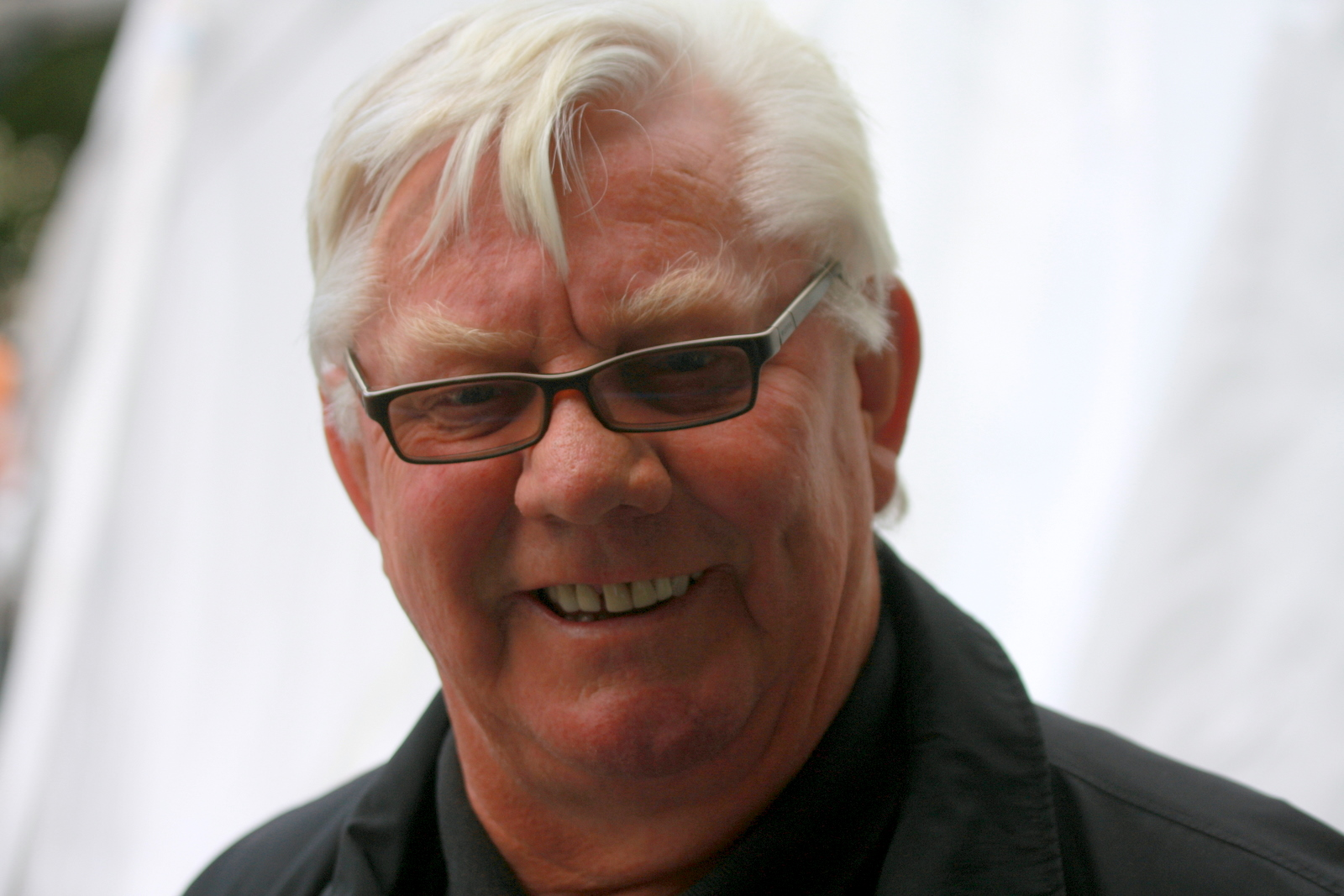
Nils Arne Eggen was awarded the Coach of the Year six times (1990, 1994, 1995, 1996, 1997 and 1999).

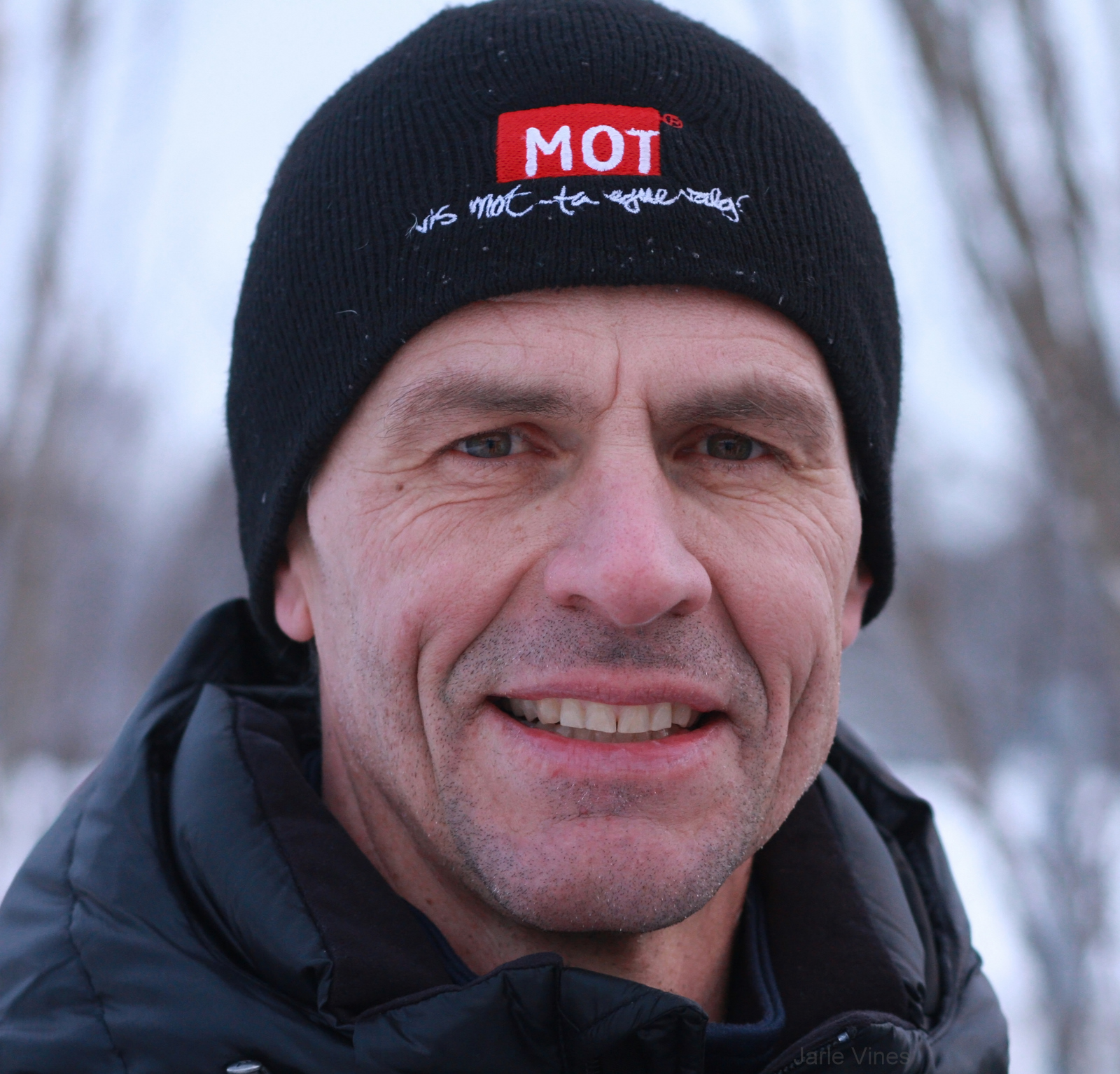
Rune Bratseth was awarded the Kniksen of the Year award a record three times (1991, 1992 and 1994).

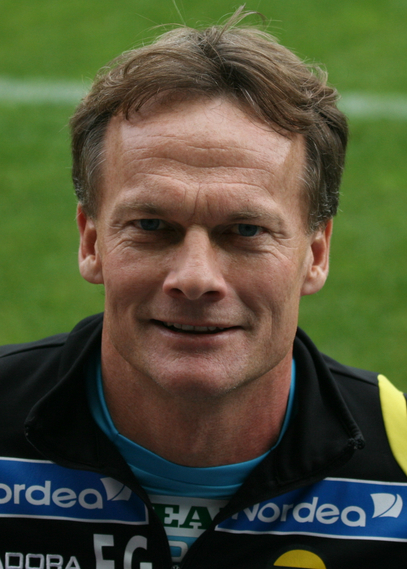
Frode Grodås became Goalkeeper of the Year in 1991 and 1993.

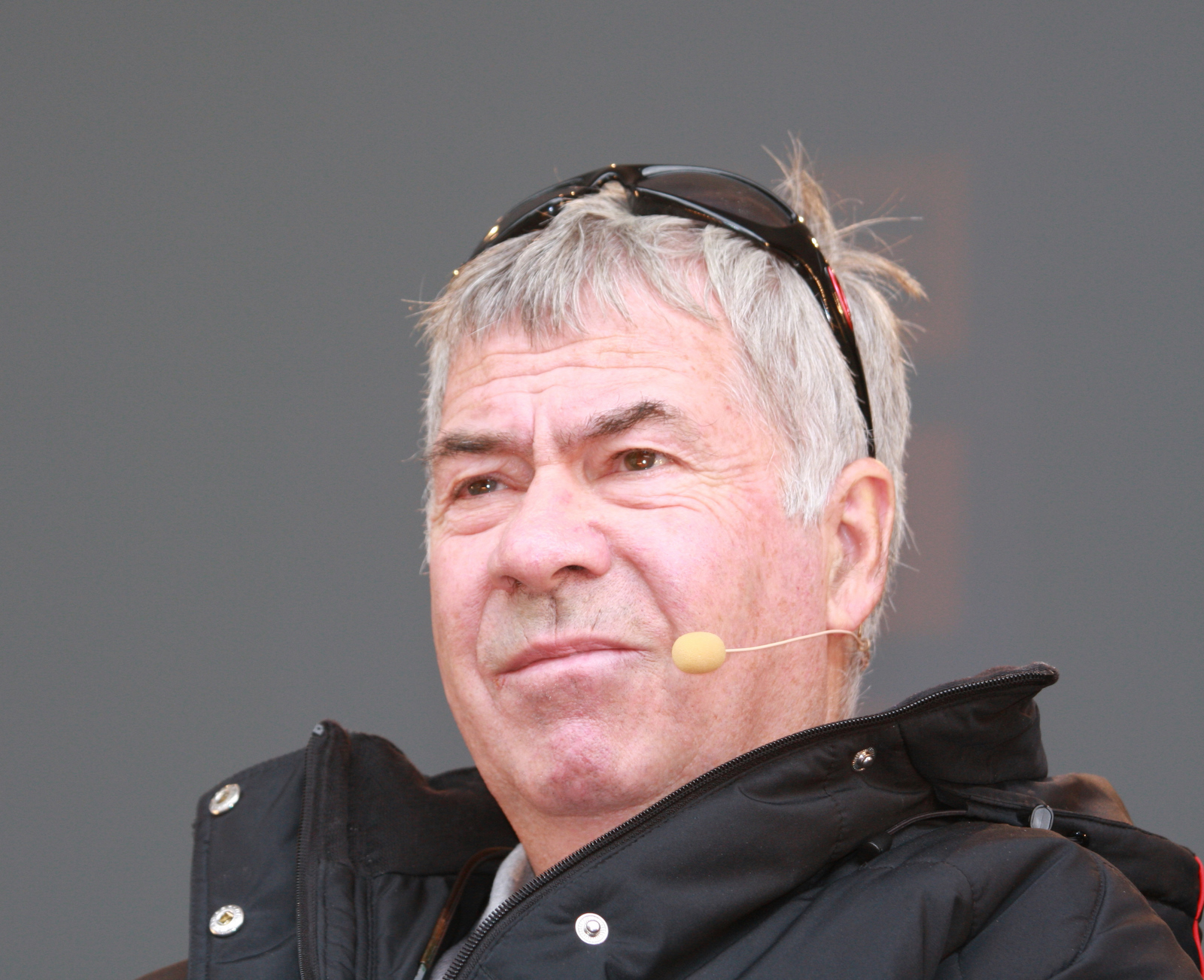
Egil Olsen was awarded the Kniksen's honour award in 1992 and the Kniksen of the Year in 1993.

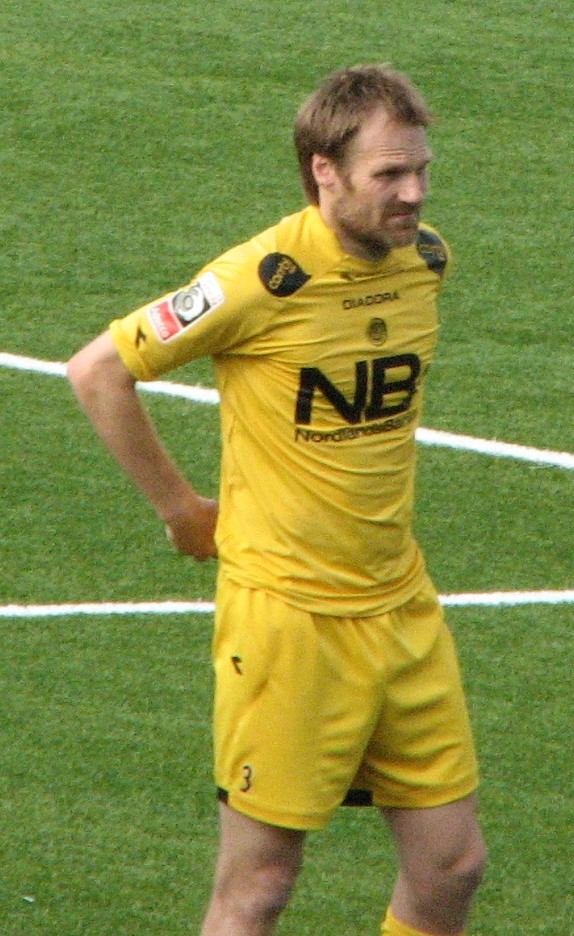
Erik Hoftun was awarded the Defender of the Year award six consecutive times from 1995 to 2000.

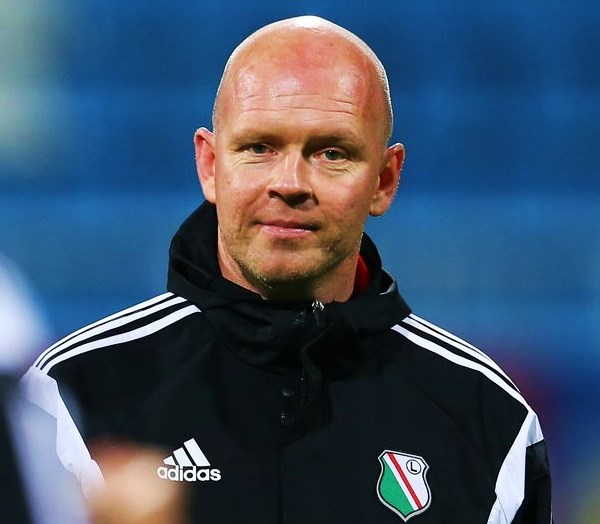
Henning Berg won Kniksen of the Year after winning the Champions League with Manchester United in 1999. He shared the Kniksen's honour award with Hege Riise in 2004.

1990

- Goalkeeper of the Year: Einar Rossbach, Tromsø IL
- Defender of the Year: Per-Ove Ludvigsen, Fyllingen Fotball
- Midfielder of the Year: Per Egil Ahlsen, SK Brann
- Striker of the Year: Tore André Dahlum, Rosenborg BK
- Coach of the Year: Nils Arne Eggen, Rosenborg BK
- Referee of the Year: Rune Pedersen, SK Sprint-Jeløy
- Kniksen of the Year: Erik Thorstvedt, Tottenham Hotspur
- Kniksen's honour award: Not Awarded

1991

- Goalkeeper of the Year: Frode Grodås, Lillestrøm SK
- Defender of the Year: Pål Lydersen, IK Start
- Midfielder of the Year: Øyvind Leonhardsen, Molde FK
- Striker of the Year: Gøran Sørloth, Rosenborg BK
- Coach of the Year: Benny Lennartsson, Viking FK
- Referee of the Year: Rune Pedersen, SK Sprint-Jeløy
- Kniksen of the Year: Rune Bratseth, Werder Bremen
- Kniksen's honour award: Terje Kojedal, Ham-Kam and Sverre Brandhaug, Rosenborg BK

1992

- Goalkeeper of the Year: Ola By Rise, Rosenborg BK
- Defender of the Year: Roger Nilsen, Viking FK
- Midfielder of the Year: Erik Mykland, IK Start
- Striker of the Year: Gøran Sørloth, Rosenborg BK
- Coach of the Year: Per Brogeland, Kongsvinger IL
- Referee of the Year: Rune Pedersen, SK Sprint-Jeløy
- Kniksen of the Year: Rune Bratseth, Werder Bremen
- Kniksen's honour award: Egil "Drillo" Olsen, Manager Norway and Per Egil Ahlsen, Fredrikstad FK

1993

- Goalkeeper of the Year: Frode Grodås, Lillestrøm SK
- Defender of the Year: Tore Pedersen, SK Brann
- Midfielder of the Year: Øyvind Leonhardsen, Rosenborg BK
- Striker of the Year: Mons Ivar Mjelde, Lillestrøm SK
- Coach of the Year: Trond Sollied, FK Bodø/Glimt
- Referee of the Year: Roy Helge Olsen, SFK Lyn
- Kniksen of the Year: Egil "Drillo" Olsen, Manager Norway
- Kniksen's honour award: Norway women's national football team

1994

- Goalkeeper of the Year: Thomas Myhre, Viking FK
- Defender of the Year: Pål Lydersen, IK Start
- Midfielder of the Year: Erik Mykland, IK Start
- Striker of the Year: Harald Martin Brattbakk, Rosenborg BK
- Coach of the Year: Nils Arne Eggen, Rosenborg BK
- Referee of the Year: Rune Pedersen, SK Sprint-Jeløy
- Kniksen of the Year: Rune Bratseth, Werder Bremen
- Kniksen's honour award: Per Ravn Omdal President, Norwegian Football Association and Rune Bratseth, Werder Bremen

1995

- Goalkeeper of the Year: Morten Bakke, Molde FK
- Defender of the Year: Erik Hoftun, Rosenborg BK
- Midfielder of the Year: Ståle Solbakken, Lillestrøm SK
- Striker of the Year: Harald Martin Brattbakk, Rosenborg BK
- Coach of the Year: Nils Arne Eggen, Rosenborg BK
- Referee of the Year: Rune Pedersen, SK Sprint-Jeløy
- Kniksen of the Year: Hege Riise, Norway
- Kniksen's honour award: Ola By Rise, Rosenborg BK

1996

- Goalkeeper of the Year: Jørn Jamtfall, Rosenborg BK
- Defender of the Year: Erik Hoftun, Rosenborg BK
- Midfielder of the Year: Trond Egil Soltvedt, Rosenborg BK
- Striker of the Year: Mons Ivar Mjelde, SK Brann
- Coach of the Year: Nils Arne Eggen, Rosenborg BK
- Referee of the Year: Rune Pedersen, SK Sprint-Jeløy
- Kniksen of the Year: Ole Gunnar Solskjær, Manchester United
- Kniksen's honour award: Erik Thorstvedt, Viking FK

1997

- Goalkeeper of the Year: Frode Olsen, Stabæk IF
- Defender of the Year: Erik Hoftun, Rosenborg BK
- Midfielder of the Year: Bent Skammelsrud, Rosenborg BK
- Striker of the Year: Harald Martin Brattbakk, Rosenborg BK
- Coach of the Year: Dag Vidar Kristoffersen, Strømsgodset IF
- Referee of the Year: Rune Pedersen, SK Sprint-Jeløy
- Kniksen of the Year: Nils Arne Eggen, manager Rosenborg BK
- Kniksen's honour award: Rosenborg BK

1998

- Goalkeeper of the Year: Frode Olsen, Stabæk IF
- Defender of the Year: Erik Hoftun, Rosenborg BK
- Midfielder of the Year: Roar Strand, Rosenborg BK
- Striker of the Year: Sigurd Rushfeldt, Rosenborg BK
- Coach of the Year: Trond Sollied, Rosenborg BK
- Referee of the Year: Rune Pedersen, SK Sprint-Jeløy
- Kniksen of the Year: Tore André Flo, Chelsea F.C.
- Kniksen's honour award: Rune Pedersen, SK Sprint-Jeløy

1999

- Goalkeeper of the Year: Frode Olsen, Stabæk IF
- Defender of the Year: Erik Hoftun, Rosenborg BK
- Midfielder of the Year: Magnus Svensson, Viking FK
- Striker of the Year: Rune Lange, Tromsø IL
- Coach of the Year: Nils Arne Eggen, Rosenborg BK
- Referee of the Year: Rune Pedersen, SK Sprint-Jeløy
- Kniksen of the Year: Henning Berg, Manchester United
- Kniksen's honour award: Nils Johan Semb, (Manager Norway) and Jostein Flo

=== 2000s ===
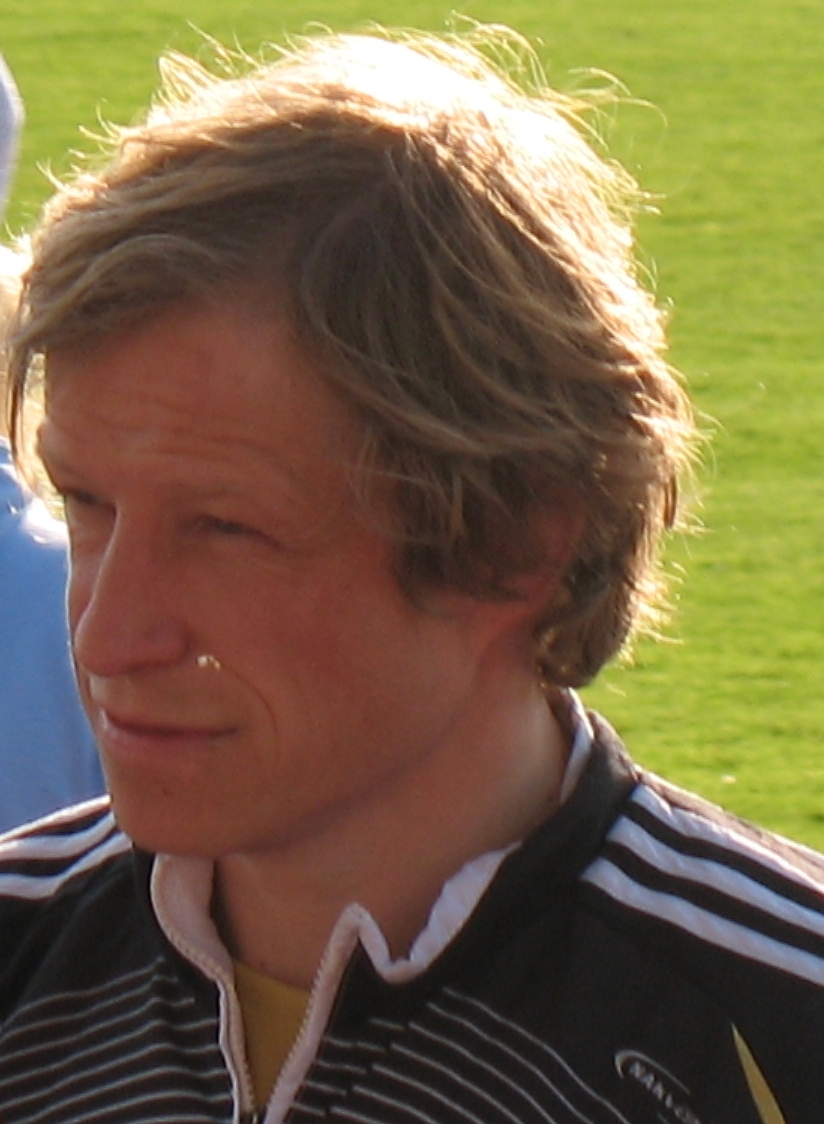
Ørjan Berg was awarded Midfielder of the Year three consecutive seasons (2000, 2001, 2002).

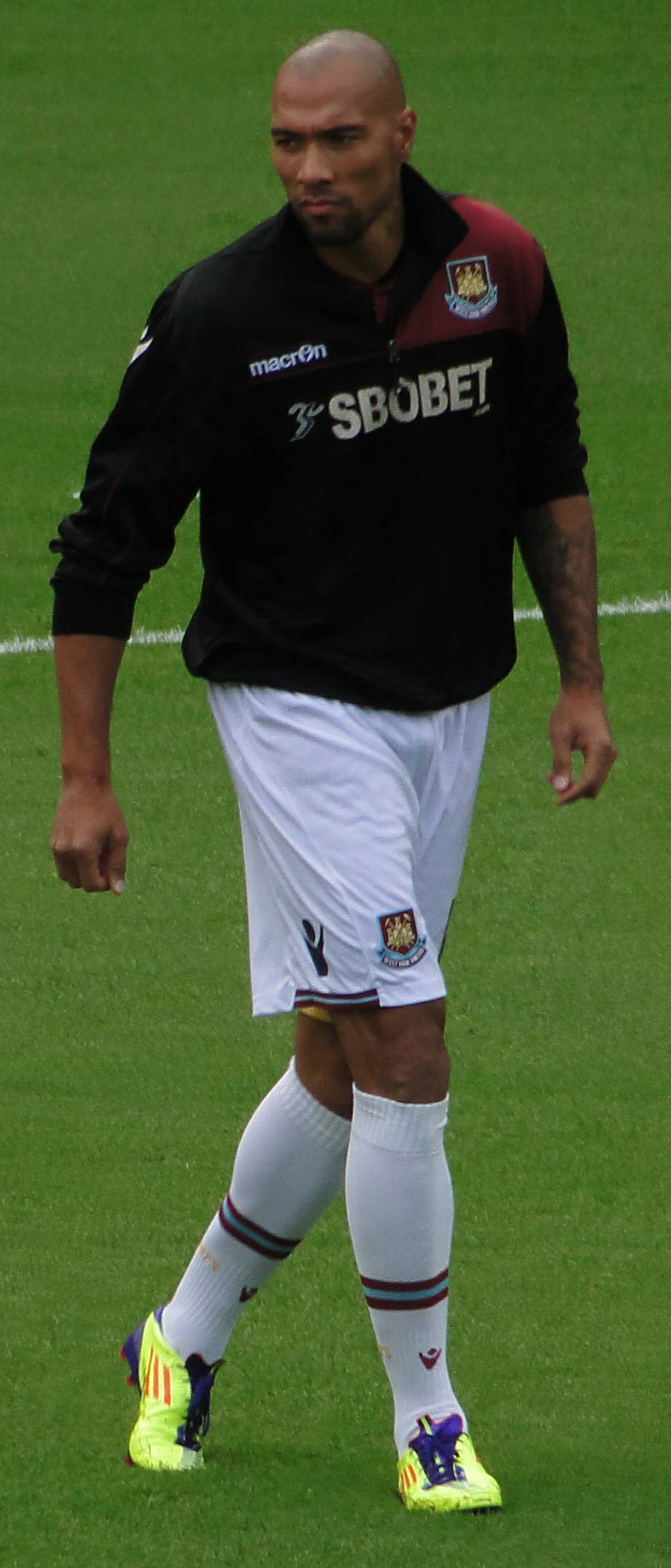
John Carew was awarded the Kniksen of the Year award a record three times (2005, 2007, 2008).

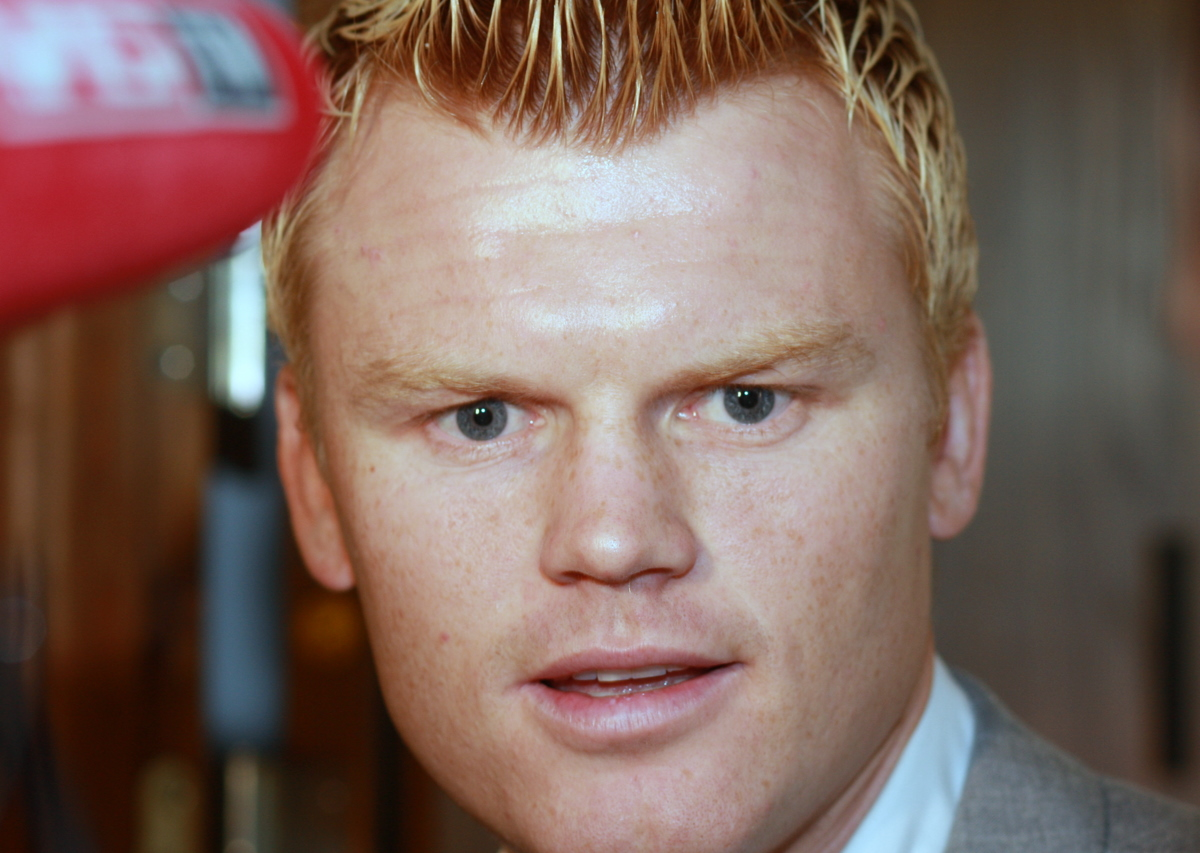
John Arne Riise was awarded the Kniksen of the Year award in 2006.

2000

- Goalkeeper of the Year: Emille Baron, Lillestrøm SK
- Defender of the Year: Erik Hoftun, Rosenborg BK
- Midfielder of the Year: Ørjan Berg, Rosenborg BK
- Striker of the Year: Thorstein Helstad, SK Brann
- Coach of the Year: Benny Lennartsson, Viking FK
- Referee of the Year: Rune Pedersen, SK Sprint-Jeløy
- Kniksen of the Year: Erik Mykland, 1860 München
- Kniksen's honour award: Jahn Ivar Jakobsen, Rosenborg BK and Norway women's national football team

2001

- Goalkeeper of the Year: Arni Gautur Arason, Rosenborg BK
- Defender of the Year: Torgeir Bjarmann, Lillestrøm SK
- Midfielder of the Year: Ørjan Berg, Rosenborg BK
- Striker of the Year: Clayton Zane, Lillestrøm SK
- Coach of the Year: Arne Erlandsen, Lillestrøm SK
- Referee of the Year: Tom Henning Øvrebø, Nordstrand IF
- Kniksen of the Year: Ørjan Berg, Rosenborg BK
- Kniksen's honour award: Bent Skammelsrud and Roar Strand, Rosenborg BK

2002

- Goalkeeper of the Year: Erik Holtan, Odd Grenland
- Defender of the Year: Tommy Berntsen, FC Lyn Oslo
- Midfielder of the Year: Ørjan Berg, Rosenborg BK
- Striker of the Year: Bengt Sæternes, FK Bodø/Glimt
- Coach of the Year: Sture Fladmark, FC Lyn Oslo
- Referee of the Year: Tom Henning Øvrebø, Nordstrand IF
- Kniksen of the Year: André Bergdølmo, Ajax
- Kniksen's honour award: Nils Arne Eggen, Rosenborg BK

2003

- Goalkeeper of the Year: Espen Johnsen, Rosenborg BK
- Defender of the Year: Vidar Riseth, Rosenborg BK
- Midfielder of the Year: Martin Andresen, Stabæk
- Striker of the Year: Harald Martin Brattbakk, Rosenborg BK
- Coach of the Year: Øystein Gåre, FK Bodø/Glimt
- Referee of the Year: Tom Henning Øvrebø, Nordstrand IF
- Kniksen of the Year: Martin Andresen, Stabæk IF
- Kniksen's honour award: Per Ravn Omdal, President, Norwegian Football Association

2004

- Goalkeeper of the Year: Ali Al-Habsi, FC Lyn Oslo
- Defender of the Year: Erik Hagen, Vålerenga IF
- Midfielder of the Year: Ardian Gashi, Vålerenga IF
- Striker of the Year: Alexander Ødegaard, Sogndal IL
- Coach of the Year: Ståle Solbakken, Ham-Kam
- Referee of the Year: Terje Hauge, Olsvik IL
- Kniksen of the Year: Erik Hagen, Vålerenga IF
- Kniksen's honour award: Henning Berg and Hege Riise

2005

- Goalkeeper of the Year: Arni Gautur Arason, Vålerenga IF
- Defender of the Year: Bård Borgersen, IK Start
- Midfielder of the Year: Kristofer Hæstad, IK Start
- Striker of the Year: Ole Martin Årst, Tromsø IL
- Coach of the Year: Tom Nordlie, IK Start
- Referee of the Year: Tom Henning Øvrebø, Nordstrand IF
- Kniksen of the Year: John Carew, Lyon
- Kniksen's honour award: Not Awarded

2006

- Goalkeeper of the Year: Håkon Opdal, SK Brann
- Defender of the Year: Per Nilsson, Odd Grenland
- Midfielder of the Year: Robert Koren, Lillestrøm SK
- Striker of the Year: Steffen Iversen, Rosenborg BK
- Coach of the Year: Knut Tørum, Rosenborg BK
- Referee of the Year: Tom Henning Øvrebø, Nordstrand IF
- Young Player of the Year: Chinedu Obasi Ogbuke, FC Lyn Oslo
- 1. divisjon Player of the Year: Mattias Andersson, Strømsgodset IF
- Kniksen of the Year: John Arne Riise, Liverpool
- Kniksen's honour award: Not Awarded

2007

- Goalkeeper of the Year: Håkon Opdal, SK Brann
- Defender of the Year: Frode Kippe, Lillestrøm SK
- Midfielder of the Year: Alanzinho, Stabæk IF
- Striker of the Year: Thorstein Helstad, SK Brann
- Coach of the Year: Mons Ivar Mjelde, SK Brann
- Referee of the Year: Terje Hauge, Olsvik IL
- Kniksen of the Year: John Carew, Aston Villa
- Kniksen's honour award: Ole Gunnar Solskjær, Manchester United

2008

- Goalkeeper of the Year: Eddie Gustafsson, FC Lyn Oslo
- Defender of the Year: Morten Morisbak Skjønsberg, Stabæk IF
- Midfielder of the Year: Alanzinho, Stabæk IF
- Striker of the Year: Daniel Nannskog, Stabæk IF
- Coach of the Year: Jan Jönsson, Stabæk & Geir Nordby, Røa IL
- Referee of the Year: Espen Berntsen, Vang in Hamar
- Kniksen of the Year: John Carew, Aston Villa
- Kniksen's honour award: Ronny Johnsen

2009

- Goalkeeper of the Year: Jon Knudsen, Stabæk
- Defender of the Year: Knut Olav Rindarøy, Molde
- Midfielder of the Year: Makhtar Thioune, Molde
- Striker of the Year: Rade Prica, Rosenborg
- Coach of the Year: Kjell Jonevret, Molde
- Referee of the Year: Kristoffer Helgerud, Lier
- Kniksen of the Year: Brede Hangeland, Fulham
- Kniksen's honour award: Karen Espelund, former Secretary-General of the Norwegian Football Association

=== 2010s ===
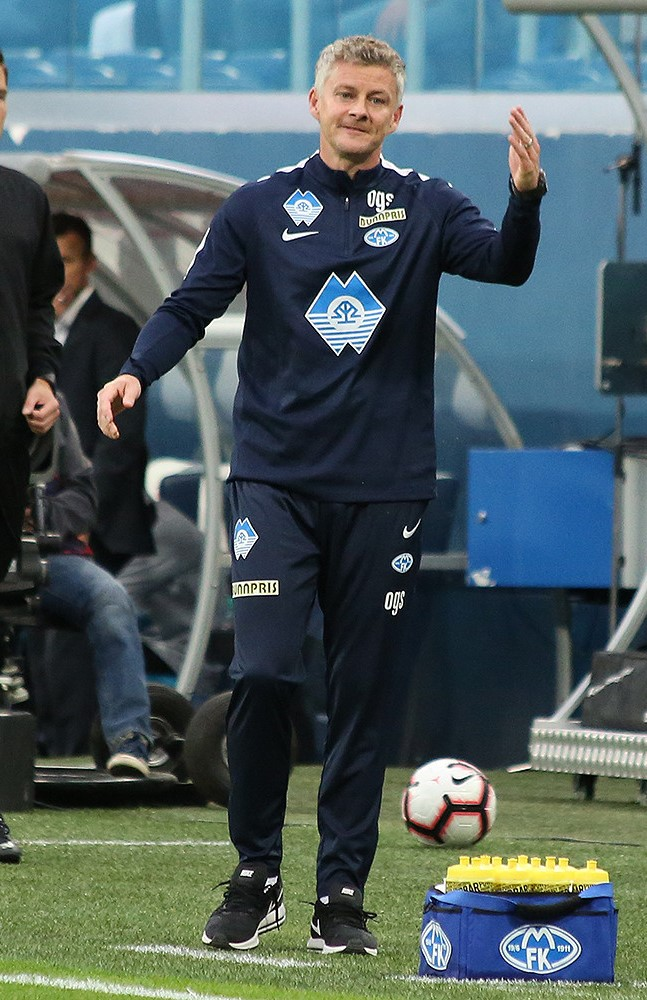
Ole Gunnar Solskjær has won four awards in three different categories: Kniksen of the Year (1996), Kniksen's honour award (2007) and Coach of the Year (2011, 2012).

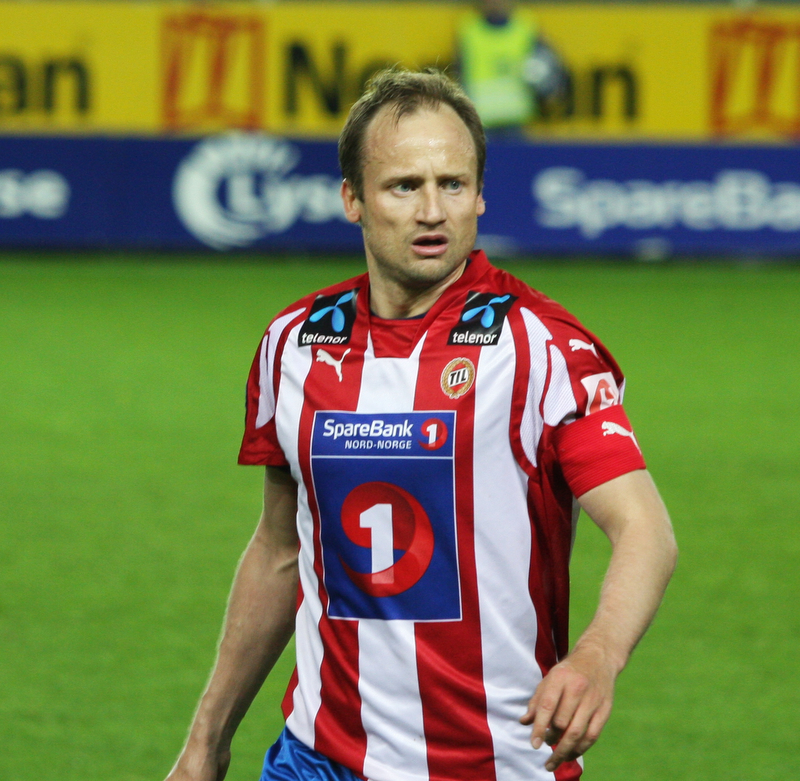
Sigurd Rushfeldt, the all-time top scorer in Eliteserien was awarded the Kniksen's honour award in 2011.

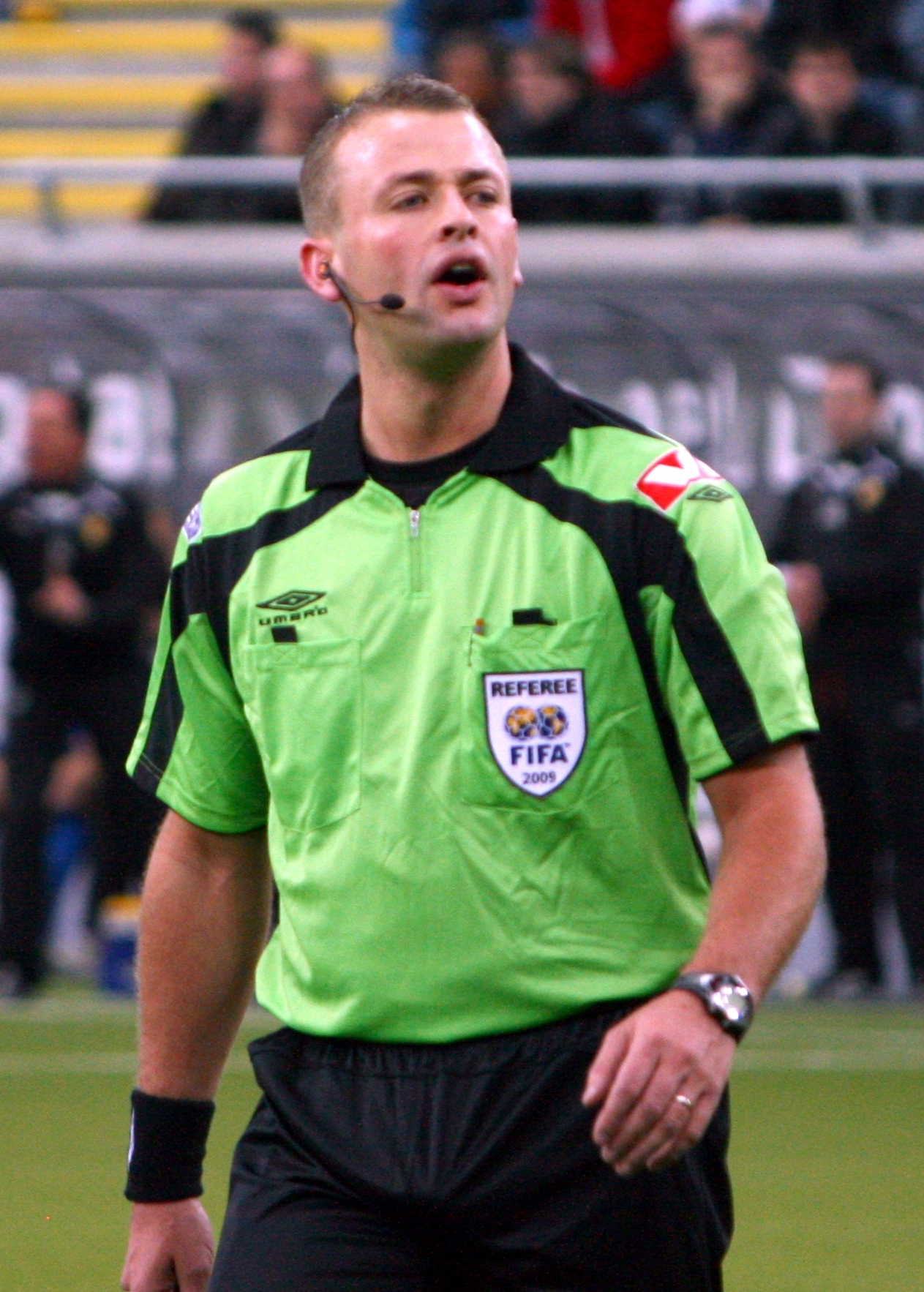
Svein Oddvar Moen was awarded the Referee of the Year award three consecutive times from 2010 to 2012.

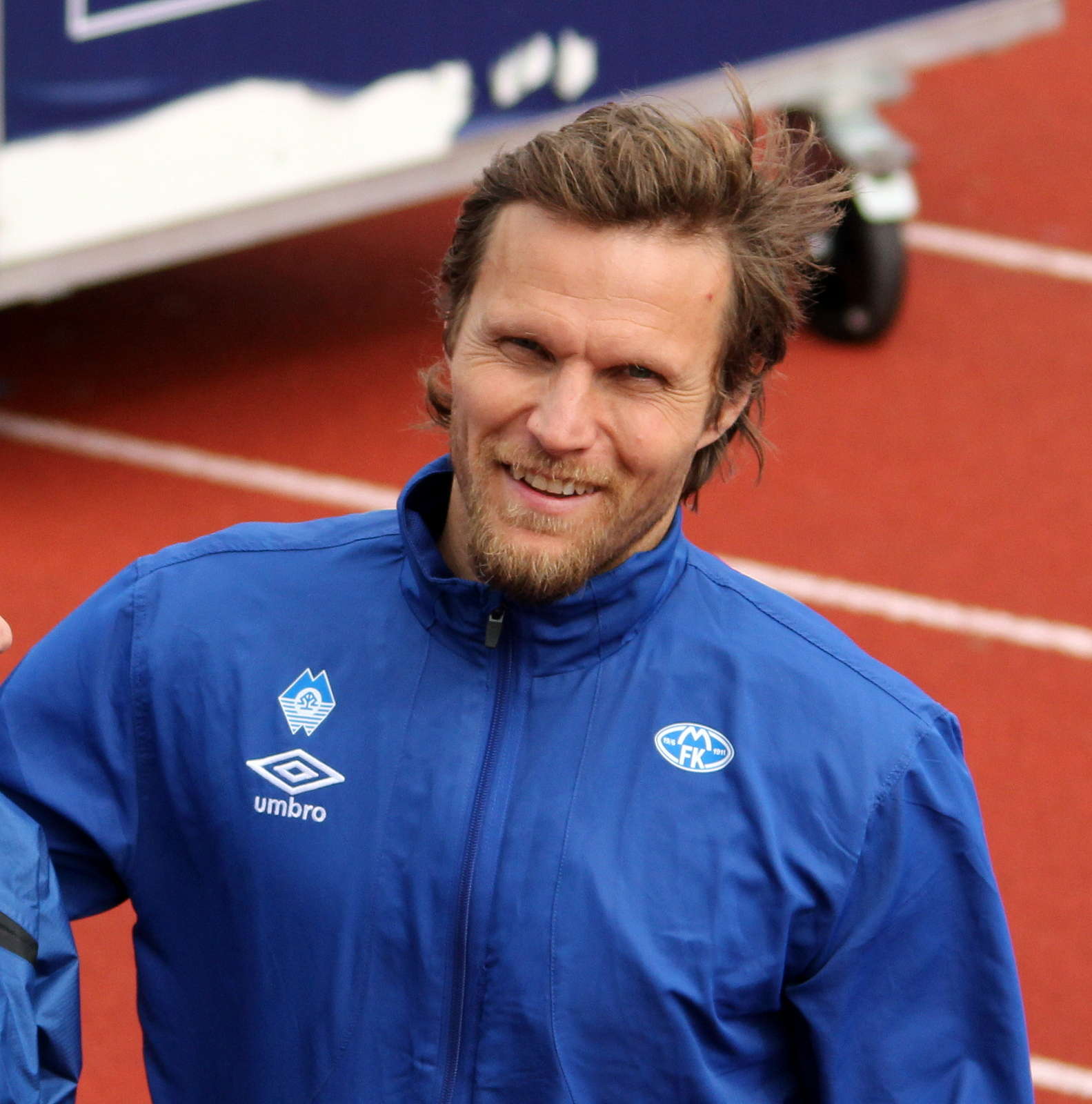
The player with most appearances in Eliteserien, Daniel Berg Hestad, was awarded the Kniksen's honour award in 2016.

2010

- Goalkeeper of the Year: Anders Lindegaard, Aalesund
- Defender of the Year: Tom Høgli, Tromsø
- Midfielder of the Year: Anthony Annan, Rosenborg
- Striker of the Year: Mohammed Abdellaoue, Vålerenga
- Coach of the Year: Jostein Grindhaug, Haugesund
- Referee of the Year: Svein Oddvar Moen, Haugar
- Kniksen of the Year: Anthony Annan, Rosenborg, Lisa-Marie Woods, Stabæk
- Kniksen's honour award: Terje Hauge, Olsvik IL

2011

- Goalkeeper of the Year: Espen Bugge Pettersen, Molde
- Defender of the Year: Even Hovland, Sogndal
- Midfielder of the Year: Michael Barrantes, Aalesund
- Striker of the Year: Nikola Djurdjic, Haugesund
- Coach of the Year: Ole Gunnar Solskjær, Molde
- Referee of the Year: Svein Oddvar Moen, Haugar
- Kniksen of the Year: Mohammed Abdellaoue, Hannover
- Kniksen's honour award: Sigurd Rushfeldt, Tromsø

2012

- Goalkeeper of the Year: Kenneth Udjus, Sogndal
- Defender of the Year: Vegard Forren, Molde
- Midfielder of the Year: Magnus Wolff Eikrem, Molde
- Striker of the Year: Alexander Søderlund, Haugesund
- Coach of the Year: Ole Gunnar Solskjær, Molde
- Referee of the Year: Svein Oddvar Moen, Haugar
- Kniksen of the Year: Brede Hangeland, Fulham
- Kniksen's honour award: Nils Skutle, Rosenborg

2013

- Goalkeeper of the Year: Adam Larsen Kwarasey, Strømsgodset
- Defender of the Year: Lars Christopher Vilsvik, Strømsgodset
- Midfielder of the Year: Stefan Johansen, Strømsgodset
- Striker of the Year: Frode Johnsen, Odd
- Coach of the Year: Ronny Deila, Strømsgodset
- 1. divisjon Player of the Year: Badou, Bodø/Glimt
- Kniksen's honour award: Not Awarded

2014

- Goalkeeper of the Year: Ørjan Nyland, Molde
- Defender of the Year: Martin Linnes, Molde
- Midfielder of the Year: Jone Samuelsen, Odd
- Striker of the Year: Vidar Örn Kjartansson, Vålerenga
- Coach of the Year: Tor Ole Skullerud, Molde
- Young Player of the Year: Martin Ødegaard, Strømsgodset
- Player of the Year: Jone Samuelsen, Odd
- Kniksen's honour award: Boye Skistad

2015

- Goalkeeper of the Year: Ørjan Nyland, Molde
- Defender of the Year: Jonas Svensson, Rosenborg
- Midfielder of the Year: Ole Selnæs, Rosenborg
- Striker of the Year: Alexander Søderlund, Rosenborg
- Coach of the Year: Bob Bradley, Stabæk
- Young Player of the Year: Iver Fossum, Strømsgodset
- Player of the Year: Ole Selnæs, Rosenborg
- Kniksen's honour award: Frode Johnsen, Odd

2016

- Goalkeeper of the Year: Piotr Leciejewski, Brann
- Defender of the Year: Jonas Svensson, Rosenborg
- Midfielder of the Year: Mike Jensen, Rosenborg
- Striker of the Year: Christian Gytkjær, Rosenborg
- Coach of the Year: Lars Arne Nilsen, Brann
- Young Player of the Year: Sander Berge, Vålerenga
- Player of the Year: Mike Jensen, Rosenborg
- Kniksen's honour award: Daniel Berg Hestad, Molde

2017

- Kniksen's honour award: Åge Hareide

2018

- Kniksen's honour award: Kjetil Rekdal

2019

- Kniksen's honour award: Bjarne Berntsen, Viking and Ingrid Hjelmseth, Stabæk

=== 2020s ===
2020

- Kniksen's honour award: Erling Haaland, Borussia Dortmund

2021

- Kniksen's honour award: Berg Family from Bodø

2022

- Kniksen's honour award: Martin Ødegaard, Arsenal

2023

- Kniksen's honour award: Teddy Moen

2024

- Kniksen's honour award:

Caroline Graham Hansen, Barcelona and Kjetil Knutsen, Bodø/Glimt

== Other awards ==
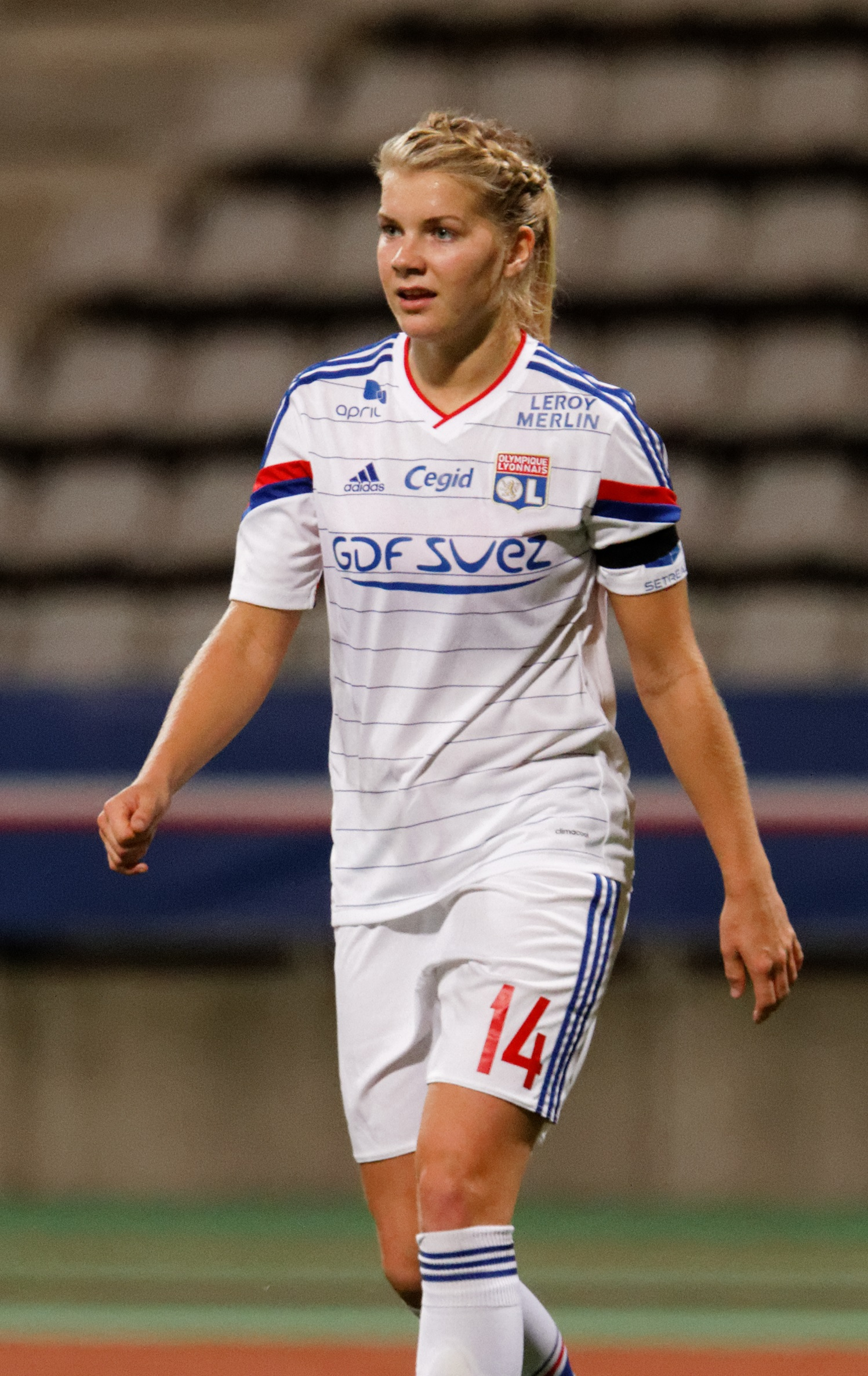
Ada Hegerberg won Gullballen in 2015, 2016 and 2018.

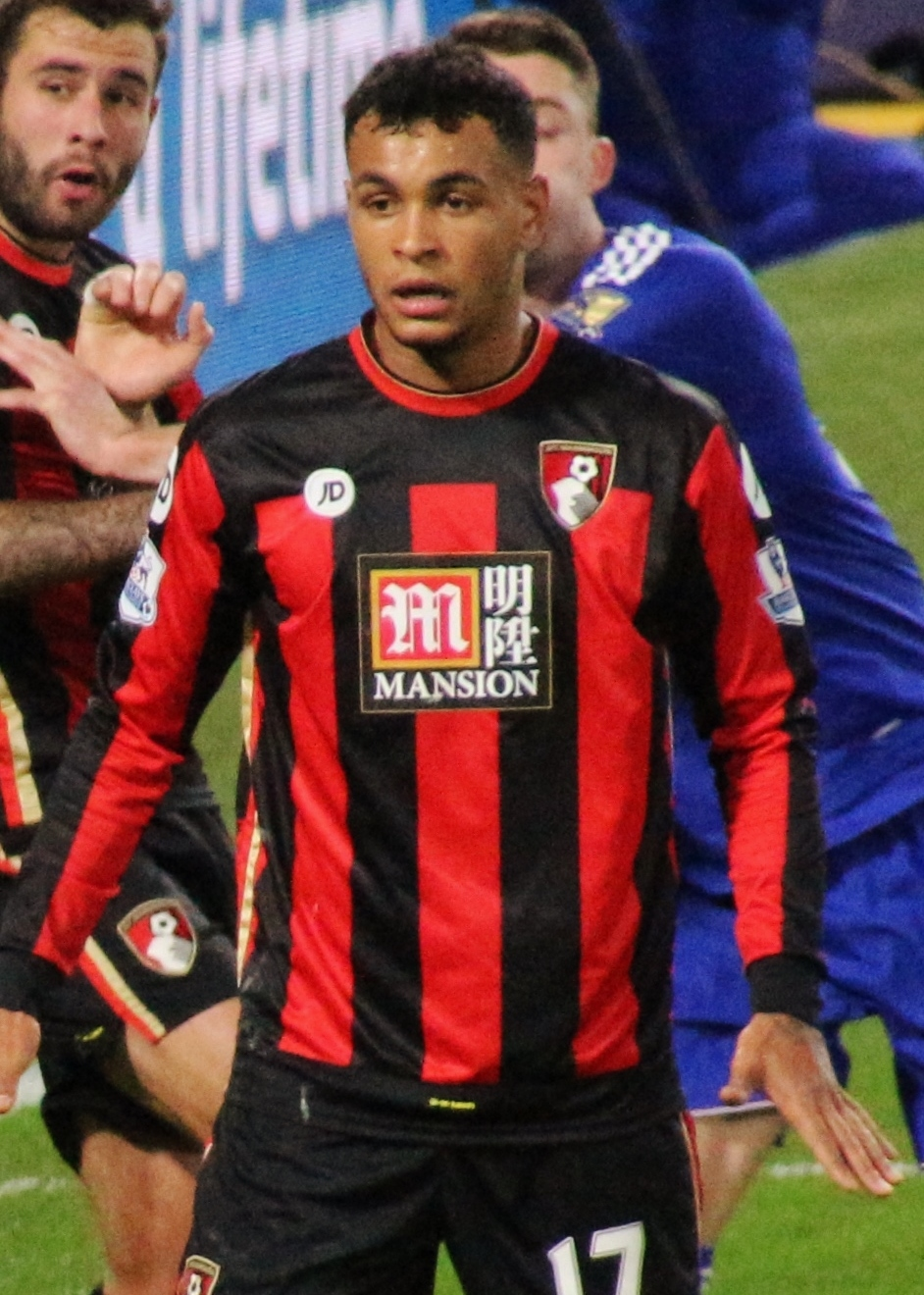
Joshua King won Gullballen in 2017.

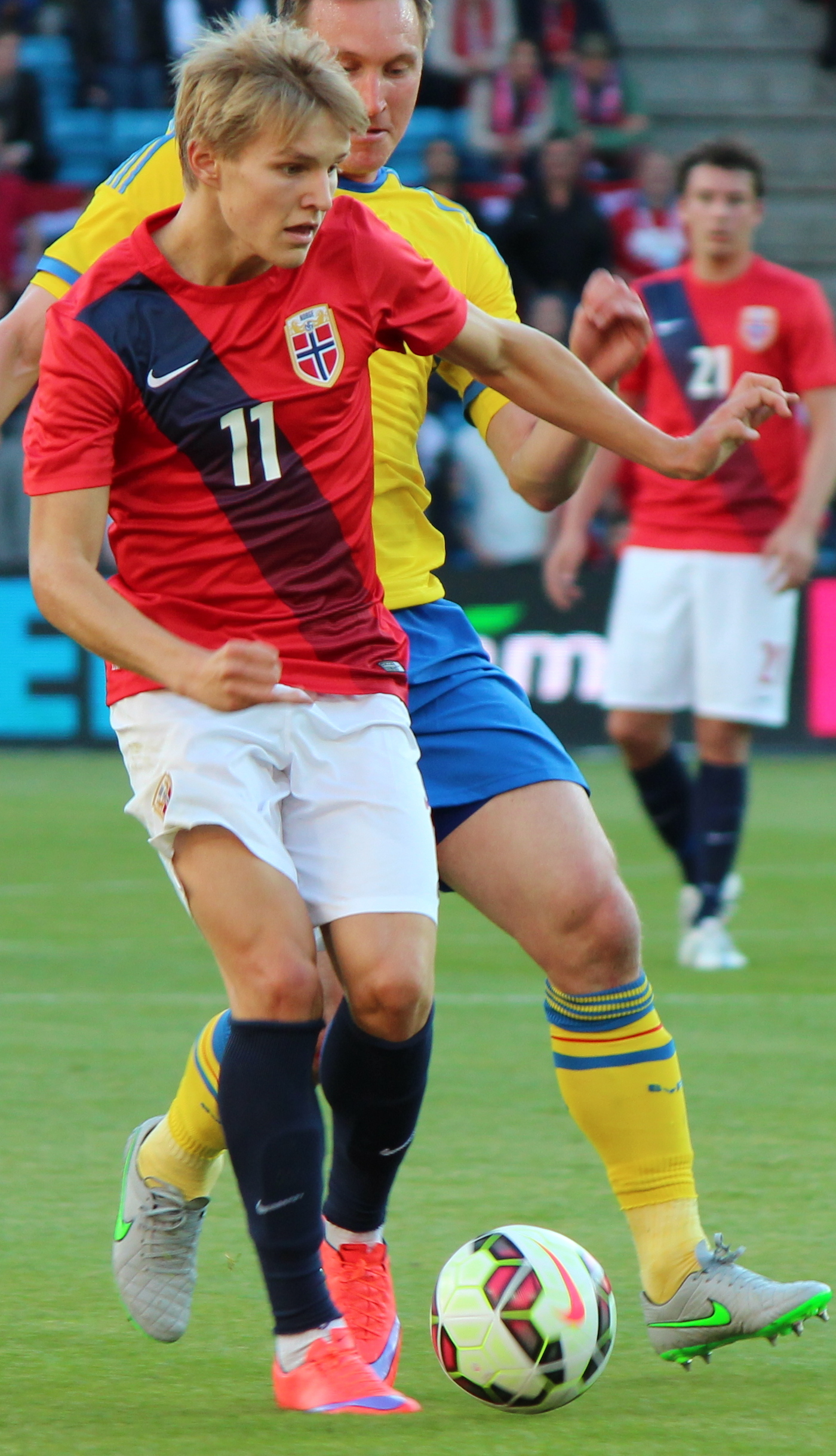
Martin Ødegaard won Gullballen in 2019.

This is a list of awards awarded in connection with the Kniksen awards, but not considered official Kniksen awards:

=== Gullballen ===
- 2014: Stefan Johansen, Celtic
- 2015: Ada Hegerberg, Lyon
- 2016: Ada Hegerberg, Lyon
- 2017: Joshua King, Bournemouth

From 2018, the Gullballen has been awarded to both a male and a female footballer.

==== Men ====
- 2018: Rune Jarstein, Hertha BSC
- 2019: Martin Ødegaard, SBV Vitesse / Real Sociedad
- 2020: Erling Haaland, Borussia Dortmund

==== Women ====
- 2018: Ada Hegerberg, Lyon
- 2019: Caroline Graham Hansen, VfL Wolfsburg / Barcelona
- 2020: Caroline Graham Hansen, Barcelona

=== Eliteserien ===
==== Player of the Year ====
- 2017: Tore Reginiussen, Rosenborg
- 2018: André Hansen, Rosenborg
- 2019: Håkon Evjen, Bodø/Glimt
- 2020: Philip Zinckernagel, Bodø/Glimt
- 2021: Patrick Berg, Bodø/Glimt
- 2022: Hugo Vetlesen, Bodø/Glimt
- 2023: Amahl Pellegrino, Bodø/Glimt
- 2024: Zlatko Tripić, Viking

==== Goal of the Year ====
- 2007: Fredrik Gulsvik, Odd (against Lyn)
- 2017: Nicklas Bendtner, Rosenborg (against Molde)
- 2018: Jon-Helge Tveita, Sarpsborg 08 (against Vålerenga)
- 2019: Ola Brynhildsen, Stabæk (against Rosenborg)

==== Breakthrough of the Year ====
- 2017: Krépin Diatta, Sarpsborg 08
- 2018: Erling Haaland, Molde

==== Young Player of the Year ====
- 2019: Håkon Evjen, Bodø/Glimt
- 2020: Jens Petter Hauge, Bodø/Glimt
- 2021: Mads Hedenstad Christiansen, Lillestrøm
- 2022: Sivert Mannsverk, Molde
- 2023: Sverre Nypan, Rosenborg
- 2024: Sverre Nypan, Rosenborg

==== Coach of the Year ====
- 2017: Kåre Ingebrigtsen, Rosenborg
- 2018: Svein Maalen, Ranheim
- 2019: Kjetil Knutsen, Bodø/Glimt
- 2020: Kjetil Knutsen, Bodø/Glimt
- 2021: Kjetil Knutsen, Bodø/Glimt
- 2022: Erling Moe, Molde
- 2023: Eirik Horneland, Brann
- 2024: Johannes Moesgaard, KFUM Oslo

=== Toppserien ===
==== Player of the Year ====
- 2010: Lisa-Marie Woods, Stabæk Kvinner
- 2018: Guro Reiten, LSK Kvinner
- 2019: Sherida Spitse, Vålerenga
- 2020: Ingibjörg Sigurdardóttir, Vålerenga

==== Goal of the Year ====
- 2018: Guro Reiten, LSK Kvinner (against Vålerenga)
- 2019: Karina Sævik, Kolbotn (against Avaldsnes)
- 2020: Elin Sørum, Rosenborg (against Lyn)

==== Breakthrough of the Year ====
- 2018: Emilie Nautnes, Arna-Bjørnar
- 2020: Elin Sørum, Rosenborg

==== Young Player of the Year ====
- 2019: Julie Blakstad, Fart

==== Coach of the Year ====
- 2018: Hege Riise, LSK Kvinner
- 2019: Hege Riise, LSK Kvinner
- 2020: Steinar Lein, Rosenborg

=== 1. divisjon ===
==== Player of the Year ====
- 2006: Mattias Andersson, Strømsgodset
- 2013: Papa Alioune Ndiaye, Bodø/Glimt
- 2017: Kristian Fardal Opseth, Bodø/Glimt
- 2018: Johnny Furdal, Viking
- 2019: Niklas Castro, Aalesund
- 2020: Sivert Mannsverk, Sogndal

==== Breakthrough of the Year ====
- 2018: Kristian Thorstvedt, Viking
- 2019: Anton Kralj, Sandefjord
- 2020: Henrik Udahl, Åsane

==== Coach of the Year ====
- 2017: Aasmund Bjørkan, Bodø/Glimt
- 2018: Steffen Landro, Nest-Sotra
- 2019: Lars Bohinen, Aalesund
- 2020: Morten Røssland, Åsane

== See also ==
- Gullballen
- NTF football awards
