= Nils Arne Eggen =

Norwegian footballer and manager (1941–2022)

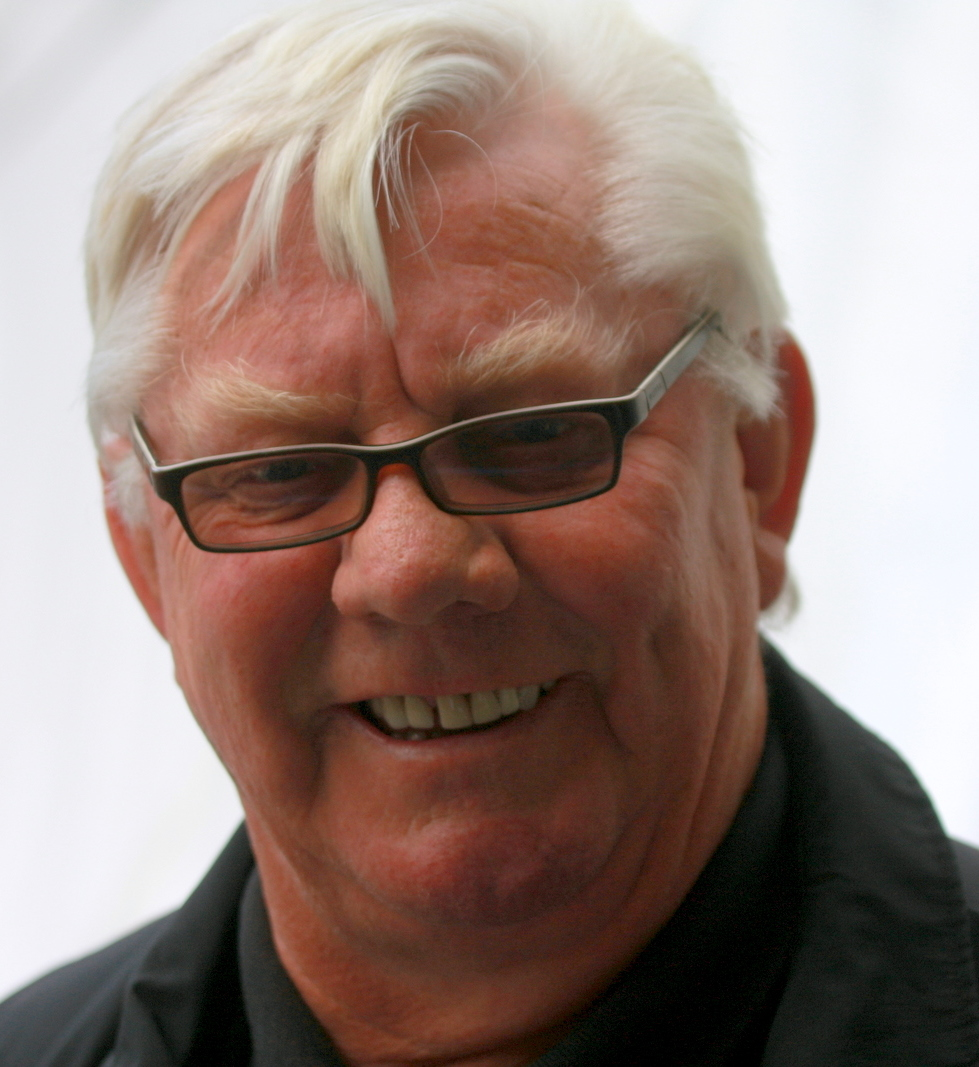
- Eggen in 2010

Personal information
- Date of birth: 17 September 1941
- Place of birth: Orkdal Municipality, Reichskommissariat Norwegen (today Norway)
- Date of death: 19 January 2022 (aged 80)
- Place of death: Orkdal, Norway
- Position: Defender

Senior career*
Years	Team	Apps	(Gls)
- Orkdal
1960–1963	Rosenborg		
1964–1966	Vålerengen		
1966–1969	Rosenborg		

International career
1963–1969	Norway	29	(0)

Managerial career
- 1971–1972: Rosenborg
- 1973–1974: Norway U21
- 1974–1977: Norway
- 1976: Rosenborg
- 1978–1982: Rosenborg
- 1983–1985: Orkdal
- 1986–1987: Moss
- 1986–1987: Norway U23
- 1988–1997: Rosenborg
- 1999–2002: Rosenborg
- 2010: Rosenborg
- 2011–2016: Orkla
- * Club domestic league appearances and goals

Nils Arne Eggen (17 September 1941 – 19 January 2022) was a Norwegian footballer, manager and teacher from Orkdal Municipality. Eggen was closely tied to Rosenborg, the club he managed for 23 years between 1970 and 2010. He is Norway's most successful club manager throughout history, having won the Norwegian top division fifteen times and the Norwegian Football Cup six times as a manager. Eggen's tactical emphasis was on playing 4–3–3 and attacking football and his way of playing football has frequently been cited as an inspiration among players, coaches and clubs alike, both domestically and abroad. In his native Trøndelag, Eggen is revered and widely regarded as the greatest and most influential sports person in the region, even eclipsing Olympic champions such as Hjalmar Andersen and Petter Northug.

His playing career started with Orkdal; he then played for Rosenborg from 1960 to 1963 and 1966 to 1969, and for Vålerengen between 1964 and 1966. He was capped 29 times for Norway between 1963 and 1969. He won the Norwegian top division once with Vålerengen and twice with Rosenborg, and the Norwegian Football Cup once with Rosenborg.

In 1971, Eggen became manager of Rosenborg, winning the league in his inaugural season. He left to take over Norway U21 in 1973. He then became national team manager for Norway jointly with Kjell Schou-Andreassen until 1977. He then returned to Rosenborg where he remained until 1982. He then coached Orkdal until 1985. In 1986, he was hired as manager for Moss, where he won the Second Division in the first season and then the top league the following. During this period he was also manager of Norway U23. He started managing Rosenborg in 1988, where he remained until 2002, except for a sabbatical in 1998. This was the team's golden age, resulting in 11 consecutive league titles and the participation in eight consecutive seasons in Champions League. Eggen returned as manager for the single 2010 season, again winning the league.

== Playing career ==
Eggen began his active football career when he was 15 years old as a defender at Orkdal's senior team. Later on he moved to Trondheim to study, and joined Rosenborg. He played with them in winning the Norwegian Football Cup in 1960.

In 1963 he moved to Oslo where he joined Vålerenga. They won the Norwegian top division in 1965, before he moved back to Trondheim where he played an important role for Rosenborg when they won the league twice – and he himself won the "Player of the Year" in 1968 – before retiring as a player.

== Coaching career ==
Eggen was appointed Rosenborg's coach, together with Tor Røste Fossen, and in his first season (1971) they won "the double" for the first time ever in the club's history. In middle of the 1970s he was the coach for the Norwegian U21 national team, and later for the senior national team. In the 1978 World Cup qualifiers, home wins over Sweden and Switzerland put Norway in contention for qualification. A loss in their final game in Switzerland meant they missed out, and it was not until 1994 that they again came close to qualification.

In 1978, he returned as coach in Rosenborg – the team struggling in Norway's second division at that time. Two years later the team once again was among the top teams in the first division. He returned to Rosenborg after being the coach of Moss in 1986–87. In his two years at Moss he first achieved promotion to the first division in 1986, and followed up by leading the club to their first and only league championship in 1987.

Eggen resigned as manager for Rosenborg in 2002. Two of Eggen's last achievements were winning the Norwegian top division (11th time in a row), and qualifying for the European UEFA Champions League (8th time in a row). During his spell as manager Rosenborg also won the Norwegian football cup a number of times.

He was again appointed by the club in November 2004 – this time as assistant manager/counsellor, a position he later stepped down from in 2005, when he admitted that his role hadn't worked as planned. In May 2010 he again took over as manager of Rosenborg after Erik Hamrén took over as manager of Sweden men's national football team. As a caretaker manager until Jan Jönsson was available to take over, Eggen led Rosenborg to their 22nd Norwegian top flight victory.

On 1 November 2011, he once again returned to coaching, this time for Orkla (former Orkdal) at the fifth level of Norwegian football. In only his first season as a coach, he had Orkla promoted to fourth tier, Third Division.

In 2003, he was awarded the Royal Norwegian Order of St. Olav for his contributions to Norwegian football.

== Football philosophy ==
Eggen mentioned the inspiration of Dutch total football and Rinus Michels for his own work. A fundamental point was the subordination of individuals (the parts) to the whole, so that the whole could outperform the sum of talents of all its players. Often he used the metaphor of the Rosenborg rhythm to get his message across. He had a focus on quick and massive counter-attacks and the building of an offensive attitude in the team. The 4–3–3 system played vital parts in Eggen's philosophy as a coach.

== Personal life ==
He was the father of Norway international footballer and manager Knut Torbjørn Eggen. His grandson Christian Eggen Rismark played professionally for Brann.

=== Death ===
Eggen died on 19 January 2022, at the age of 80.

== Quotes ==
- "It's hope in the hanging snore" – having trouble translating a Norwegian proverb on an international press conference.
- "We play with two stoppers and three spisses" – speaking about Rosenborg's tactics at a press conference before a Champions League game (stoppers meaning centre backs and spisses means forwards).
- "Congratulations, arse-football!" – (Gratulerer, rævva-fotball!), coining a new Norwegian term that's been popular ever since. Told Molde coach Åge Hareide after Rosenborg lost the semi-final of the 1994 Norwegian Football Cup.

== Honours ==
=== Player ===
Vålerengen

- Norwegian top division: 1965

Rosenborg

- Norwegian top division: 1967, 1969
- Norwegian Cup: 1960

Individual

- Norwegian top division Player of the Year: 1967

=== Manager ===
Rosenborg

- Norwegian top division (14): 1971, 1988, 1990, 1992, 1993, 1994, 1995, 1996, 1997, 1999, 2000, 2001, 2002, 2010
- Norwegian Cup (6): 1971, 1988, 1990, 1992, 1995, 1999

Moss

- Norwegian top division: 1987
- Norwegian second division (Group A): 1986

Individual

- Kniksen Award Coach of the Year (6): 1990, 1994, 1995, 1996, 1997, 1999
- Kniksen's honour award: 2002
