= Brede Skistad =

Norwegian footballer (1948–1995)

Brede Skistad (4 March 1948 – 25 August 1995) was a Norwegian football player and manager.

A defender, he played for Mjøndalen IF between 1968 and 1977. He was also Norwegian champion in bandy for the club.

He started his coaching career in Drammen Strong, Djerv 1919, Kristiansund FK and Stord IL. From 1990 to 1994, he was manager of IK Start. He took Start to two third-place finishes in the league in 1991 and 1992. In 1992, Start were close to winning the title, but fell short in their final matches, and eventually finished third. In 1993, Start collapsed after the sale of Frank Strandli and Start were close to being relegated. In 1994, Start wanted to win the title again, and bought back Tore André Dahlum, Petter Belsvik, and Tommy Svindal Larsen. However, they finished fourth after a miserable start with a number of draws. After a break for the World Cup, Start's season ended strongly.

Skistad quit as Start manager after the 1994 season due to leukaemia, and handed the position over to his assistant, Erik Ruthford Pedersen. He made a short comeback in the 1995 season, but he left again after a short time. The disease flared up again and he died on 25 August 1995 at the age of 47.

Skistad was mentioned regarding the Norwegian national team manager job after Ingvar Stadheim left in 1990, but Egil Olsen was eventually named as national manager. Skistad went on to work as a commentator and summariser for football games for NRK and TV 2.

Brede Skistad was the twin brother of Boye Skistad who played alongside Brede in Mjøndalen, and later managed the same club.
