= Harald Brattbakk =

Norwegian footballer (born 1971)

Personal information
- Full name: Harald Martin Brattbakk
- Date of birth: 1 February 1971 (age 55)
- Place of birth: Trondheim, Norway
- Height: 1.82 m (6 ft 0 in)
- Position: Striker

Youth career
- –1989: Kolstad IL

Senior career*
Years	Team	Apps	(Gls)
1990–1991	Rosenborg	14	(2)
1992–1993	Bodø/Glimt	41	(24)
1994–1997	Rosenborg	100	(94)
1997–2000	Celtic	44	(12)
2000–2001	Copenhagen	31	(14)
2001–2006	Rosenborg	109	(55)
2005	→ Bodø/Glimt (loan)	11	(5)
2008	Kolstad	5	(2)
Total		355	(208)

International career
1995–2004	Norway	17	(5)
- * Club domestic league appearances and goals

Harald Martin Brattbakk (born 1 February 1971) is a Norwegian former professional footballer who played as a striker. He was the all-time top scorer in the Norwegian top division with 166 goals in 255 matches, before being surpassed by Sigurd Rushfeldt in 2011. After his retirement from playing he became a pilot.

== Club career ==
Brattbakk was born in Trondheim. He has played for Kolstad, Rosenborg BK, Celtic, F.C. Copenhagen and Bodø/Glimt (loan).

Brattbakk is most known for his goalscoring abilities for the Norwegian club Rosenborg BK where he has enjoyed three spells (1990–91, 1994–97 and 2001–06) scoring most of his goals which has helped him reach the top of the all-time goalscoring chart in the Norwegian Premier League.

At Celtic, where he played from December 1997 to January 2000, Brattbakk seemed overawed by the pressures of playing for one of Scotland's Old Firm clubs. Though he did enjoy some success with the club — including hitting the clinching goal against St Johnstone to help them win the SPL title on the final day of the 1997–1998 season, and scoring all four goals in a 4–0 win over Kilmarnock that same year — his spell in Glasgow was generally characterised by nervous performances and insufficient goals.

However, Brattbakk has been very successful in Norway. With 166 goals he was the highest-scoring player in the history of the Norwegian Premier League, until his record was beat by Sigurd Rushfeldt on 29 May 2011. Moreover, his record in the Champions League is an impressive one, and includes goals against such top sides as Real Madrid and Milan. He scored 28 goals in 66 matches for Rosenborg BK and scored 4 goals in 9 matches for Celtic in various European Cups. In November 2001, he scored twice against his old club Celtic as Rosenborg defeated them 2–0 in a Champions League tie in Trondheim.

Brattbakk returned to Rosenborg after being on a loan to Bodø/Glimt in the last half of the 2005 season, but on 20 February 2006 it was announced that he had been relieved from his contract and he has now retired from the game.

In 2008 Brattbakk made a comeback in football after signing a contract with his native Kolstad, an amateur club in the Norwegian 3rd Division Dep. 19. However, the comeback lasted only for the rest of the 2008 season.

== International career ==
Brattbakk made his debut for Norway in a February 1995 friendly match against Estonia in which he scored two goals. He went on to play seventeen times for his country, scoring five goals.

== Retirement ==
On 21 November 2006, Brattbakk announced on the Norwegian television channel TV3 that he intended to become an airline pilot after his retirement from professional football. He trained as a pilot in Florida at Phoenix East Aviation, Inc. and got his commercial aircraft certification in 2008. Until 2010 he flew for the aircraft company Helitrans, based at Trondheim Airport, Værnes. This included missions for Norwegian Coast Guard. From 2010 he has been working as a pilot for Norwegian Air Shuttle.

== Personal life ==
His son Filip Brattbakk plays for Klaksvíkar Ítróttarfelag.

== Career statistics ==
Appearances and goals by club, season and competition
Club	Season	League			Cup		Continental		Total	
Club	Season	Division	Apps	Goals	Apps	Goals	Apps	Goals	Apps	Goals
Rosenborg	1990	Tippeligaen	3	1	0	0	0	0	3	1
Rosenborg	1991	Tippeligaen	11	1	4	2	2	0	17	3
Rosenborg	Total		14	2	4	2	2	0	20	4
Bodø/Glimt	1992	First Division	19	14	5	5	–		24	19
Bodø/Glimt	1993	Tippeligaen	22	10	7	4	–		29	14
Bodø/Glimt	Total		41	24	12	9	0	0	53	33
Rosenborg	1994	Tippeligaen	22	17	7	10	4	3	33	30
Rosenborg	1995	Tippeligaen	26	26	10	10	7	4	43	40
Rosenborg	1996	Tippeligaen	26	28	4	11	10	2	40	41
Rosenborg	1997	Tippeligaen	26	23	5	7	8	5	39	35
Rosenborg	Total		100	94	26	38	29	14	155	146
Celtic	1997–98	Scottish Premier League	17	7	4	3	–		21	10
Celtic	1998–99	Scottish Premier League	25	5	2	1	7	2	34	8
Celtic	1999–2000	Scottish Premier League	2	0	0	0	2	2	4	2
Celtic	Total		44	12	6	4	9	4	59	20
Copenhagen	1999–2000	Danish Superliga	14	7	2	1	0	0	16	8
Copenhagen	2000–01	Danish Superliga	17	7	2	0	–		19	7
Copenhagen	Total		31	14	4	1	0	0	35	15
Rosenborg	2001	Tippeligaen	25	15	3	3	8	3	36	21
Rosenborg	2002	Tippeligaen	25	17	4	10	8	3	37	30
Rosenborg	2003	Tippeligaen	25	17	6	9	8	5	39	31
Rosenborg	2004	Tippeligaen	25	4	5	11	9	3	39	18
Rosenborg	2005	Tippeligaen	9	2	3	2	0	0	12	4
Rosenborg	Total		109	55	21	35	33	14	163	104
Bodø/Glimt (loan)	2005	Tippeligaen	11	5	0	0	–		11	6
Kolstad	2008	Third division	5	2	0	0	–		5	2
Career total			355	208	73	89	73	32	501	329

== Honours ==
Bodø/Glimt

- Norwegian Cup: 1993

Rosenborg

- Tippeligaen: 1994, 1995, 1996, 1997, 2001, 2002, 2003, 2004
- Norwegian Cup: 1995, 2003

Celtic

- Scottish Premier Division: 1997–98

Copenhagen

- Danish Superliga: 2000–01

Individual

- Tippeligaen top scorer: 1994, 1995, 1996, 2002, 2003
- Kniksen Award Striker of the Year: 1994, 1995, 1997, 2003
