= Jan Hansen (footballer) =

Norwegian footballer (born 1955)

Personal information
- Date of birth: 14 February 1955 (age 71)
- Place of birth: Trondheim, Norway
- Position: Midfielder

Youth career
- Ranheim

Senior career*
Years	Team	Apps	(Gls)
–1974	Ranheim		
1975–1988	Rosenborg	252	(38)

International career
	Norway	19	(0)
- * Club domestic league appearances and goals

Jan Hansen (born 14 February 1955) is a retired Norwegian footballer who played for Ranheim, Rosenborg BK and Norway. He played 252 league matches for Rosenborg, ranking fifth overall in the club history. He was capped 19 times for Norway.
