= Boye Skistad =

Norwegian footballer (born 1948)

Personal information
- Date of birth: 4 March 1948 (age 78)
- Position: Midfielder

Senior career*
Years	Team	Apps	(Gls)
1968–1970	Mjøndalen		
1971	Brann	6	(0)
1972–1979	Mjøndalen		

International career
1965–1966	Norway U19	10	(1)
1971	Norway U21	1	(0)
1976	Norway	2	(0)

Managerial career
- 1986–1992: Mjøndalen
- * Club domestic league appearances and goals

Boye Skistad (born 4 March 1948) is a Norwegian retired football player and manager who played as a midfielder. He spent his entire career in Mjøndalen, except for one mediocre season in SK Brann. He also managed Mjøndalen, guiding the team to the 1992 Eliteserien. Skistad represented Norway as an U19, U21 and senior international. He was a twin brother of Brede Skistad.
