= Knut Torbjørn Eggen =

Norwegian footballer and coach (1960–2012)

Personal information
- Full name: Knut Torbjørn Eggen
- Date of birth: 1 November 1960
- Place of birth: Orkdal Municipality, Norway
- Date of death: 20 February 2012 (aged 51)
- Place of death: Moss Municipality, Norway
- Position: Defender

Youth career
- –1978: Orkdal IL

Senior career*
Years	Team	Apps	(Gls)
1978–1991	Rosenborg	237	(21)

International career
1984	Norway	4	(0)

Managerial career
- 1994–1996: Aalesund
- 1997–2001: Moss
- 2002–2006: Fredrikstad
- * Club domestic league appearances and goals

Knut Torbjørn Eggen (1 November 1960 – 20 February 2012) was a Norwegian football coach and player, famous for his time in Rosenborg as a player, and Moss and Fredrikstad as a coach. He was the son of Norway's most successful football coach, Nils Arne Eggen.

== Playing career ==
Eggen was born on 1 November 1960 in Orkdal, to football player Nils Arne Eggen and Karin Pauline Eggen (1940–2011), as the first of three children. He began his youth career in the local club Orkdal IL, before moving on to Rosenborg in 1978, where his father was the head coach. He won the league three times and the Norwegian Cup two times with Rosenborg, where he spent his entire professional career until he retired in 1991, aged 31. He also competed for Norway at the 1984 Summer Olympics and was capped four times in total for Norway.

== Coaching career ==
After Eggen retired as a player, he started to work as an assistant coach in Rosenborg from 1992 to 1993. He then moved to Aalesund in 1994, where he started his career as a head coach. After three years in Aalesund, he followed in his father's footsteps in Moss, where they won promotion to Tippeligaen in his first season. Moss stayed in Tippeligaen under Eggen's command, and after the 2001-season he became coach of another club from Østfold, the old giants, Fredrikstad FK.

The old giants, with nine league championships and ten cup championships, had been playing at the third tier for nine straight seasons when Eggen was hired in 2001. They won promotion to the First Division in 2002 and Eliteserien in 2003. In 2005, former national team coach Egil Olsen was hired as head coach for Fredrikstad, while Knut Torbjørn Eggen stepped down to work as an assistant coach. When Olsen retired from the position at the end of the year, due to health issues, Eggen was once again promoted to his previous job. In 2006, he led the team to eighth place in the Premier Division, their highest placing so far, and also led the team to gold in the Norwegian Championship Cup that year, in what would be his final match with the club. After this very successful season, Eggen quit his job in Fredrikstad in December 2006, after several major disagreements with new club director Morgan Andersen.

After leaving his job in Fredrikstad, Eggen was appointed as new club director in Rosenborg, after long-time director Rune Bratseth had resigned from the position. He only held that position for a year, before he returned to Moss FK to work in youth development as a coach in 2007. In 2008, he was appointed head of this department. He left this job in early 2010 to take over the coaching duties of the Norwegian under-19 national team.

During his later years, he also worked frequently as a commentator and match analyst with Norwegian TV channel Viasat 4 as part of the channel's coverage of the UEFA Champions League.

== Personal life ==
Outside of football, Eggen was (like his father) a teacher by education, and he also held a degree in football coaching, the only coach in the Premier Division to have such during his time there. Eggen struggled with anxiety disorder for most of his life, and came public with his struggles in 1988, when he admitted that he did not play the Norwegian Cup final that year because of his anxiety issues. He also did a number of interviews about living with the disease.

Eggen was found dead in his own home on 20 February 2012. No cause of death was made public at the time. However, in an interview with Verdens Gang in October 2013, his father Nils Arne Eggen told that Knut Torbjørn chose to end his own life after years of struggling with anxiety disorder which got progressively worse, and that "In the end, his fear of living became greater than his fear of dying."

== Honours ==
=== As player ===
Rosenborg

- First Division: 1985, 1988, 1990
- Norwegian Cup: 1988, 1990

=== As coach ===
Fredrikstad

- Norwegian Cup: 2006
