= 2001 Tippeligaen =

58th season of top-tier football league in Norway

Tippeligaen
- Season: 2001
- Dates: 16 April – 28 October
- Champions: Rosenborg; 16th title
- Relegated: Strømsgodset; Tromsø
- Champions League: Rosenborg; Lillestrøm
- UEFA Cup: Viking; Stabæk; Brann
- Matches: 182
- Goals: 651 (3.58 per match)
- Top goalscorer: Thorstein Helstad; Frode Johnsen; Clayton Zane (17 goals)
- Biggest home win: Brann 8–1 Stabæk
- Biggest away win: Sogndal 1–6 Rosenborg
- Highest scoring: Lillestrøm 7–4 Strømsgodset
- Longest winning run: 8 games Rosenborg
- Longest unbeaten run: 14 games Lillestrøm
- Longest winless run: 10 games Strømsgodset; Tromsø
- Longest losing run: 8 games Bryne
- Highest attendance: 19,308; Brann 2–6 Rosenborg (28 October 2001)
- Lowest attendance: 966; Sogndal 3–2 Bodø/Glimt (28 October 2001)
- Average attendance: 5,578 ▼2.6%

The 2001 Tippeligaen was the 57th completed season of top division football in Norway.

Each team played 26 games with three points given for wins and one point for a draw. Number thirteen and fourteen were relegated, number twelve has to play two qualification matches (home and away) against number three in the 1. divisjon (where number one and two are directly promoted) for the last spot.

== Teams and locations ==
Locations of the teams in 2001 Tippeligaen

Note: Table lists in alphabetical order.

Team	Ap.	Location	Stadium
Bodø/Glimt	13	Bodø	Aspmyra Stadion
Brann	45	Bergen	Brann Stadion
Bryne	15	Bryne	Bryne Stadion
Lillestrøm	38	Lillestrøm	Åråsen Stadion
Lyn	28	Oslo	Ullevaal Stadion
Molde	26	Molde	Molde Stadion
Moss	21	Moss	Melløs Stadion
Odd Grenland	21	Skien	Odd Stadion
Rosenborg	38	Trondheim	Lerkendal Stadion
Sogndal	9	Sogndalsfjøra	Fosshaugane
Stabæk	7	Bærum	Nadderud Stadion
Strømsgodset	19	Drammen	Marienlyst Stadion
Tromsø	16	Tromsø	Alfheim Stadion
Viking	52	Stavanger	Stavanger Stadion

== League table ==
Pos	Team	Pld	W	D	L	GF	GA	GD	Pts	Qualification or relegation
1	Rosenborg (C)	26	17	6	3	71	30	+41	57	Qualification for the Champions League third qualifying round
2	Lillestrøm	26	17	5	4	64	33	+31	56	Qualification for the Champions League second qualifying round
3	Viking	26	14	7	5	43	29	+14	49	Qualification for the UEFA Cup first round (Note: Since Viking qualified to the UEFA Cup first round as Norwegian Cup winners, their place in the UEFA Cup as third-placed team passed down and was awarded to Stabæk as the highest-placed team not already qualified for European competitions.)
4	Stabæk	26	14	3	9	45	39	+6	45	Qualification for the UEFA Cup qualifying round
5	Molde	26	13	5	8	54	41	+13	44	
6	Odd Grenland	26	12	6	8	50	40	+10	42	
7	Brann	26	12	5	9	63	48	+15	41	Qualification for the UEFA Cup qualifying round (Note: Brann qualified to the UEFA Cup through the UEFA Fair Play ranking award.)
8	Sogndal	26	9	5	12	45	61	−16	32	
9	Bodø/Glimt	26	7	8	11	45	47	−2	29	
10	Moss	26	9	2	15	35	48	−13	29	
11	Lyn	26	6	8	12	40	49	−9	26	
12	Bryne (O)	26	6	4	16	33	61	−28	22	Qualification for the relegation play-offs
13	Strømsgodset (R)	26	3	10	13	40	73	−33	19	Relegation to First Division
14	Tromsø (R)	26	4	4	18	23	52	−29	16	Relegation to First Division

Source: fotball.no
Rules for classification: 1) points; 2) goal difference; 3) number of goals scored.
(C) Champions; (O) Play-off winners; (R) Relegated

== Relegation play-offs ==
- Bryne won the play-offs against HamKam 3–0 on aggregate.
7 November 2001
13:00 CET (UTC+1)

Bryne	3–0	HamKam
Andreasson 25'; Bjørnsen 84', 86'	Report

Bryne Stadion, Bryne
Attendance: 4,030
Referee: Roy Helge Olsen

10 November 2001
12:00 CET (UTC+1)

HamKam	0–0	Bryne
	Report

Briskeby gressbane, Hamar
Attendance: 2,552
Referee: Tommy Skjerven

== Results ==
Home \ Away	BOD	BRA	BRY	LIL	LYN	MOL	MOS	ODD	ROS	SOG	STB	STM	TRO	VIK
Bodø/Glimt	—	5–1	0–0	1–2	5–2	3–2	0–2	1–1	1–4	2–2	2–2	2–2	1–0	2–1
Brann	2–2	—	3–4	1–1	2–1	0–0	1–0	3–1	2–6	2–1	8–1	6–2	3–1	0–1
Bryne	2–1	0–3	—	0–5	1–2	4–3	1–4	1–3	1–2	2–3	0–1	1–1	3–0	1–3
Lillestrøm	1–0	2–1	0–0	—	2–1	4–1	3–0	3–3	1–2	4–1	2–1	7–4	3–1	4–0
Lyn	2–1	3–2	1–3	0–2	—	0–2	0–2	1–2	1–1	1–1	1–1	2–2	4–0	1–1
Molde	4–1	0–3	5–0	1–2	3–2	—	1–1	6–1	1–1	3–2	1–4	3–0	4–3	2–1
Moss	2–0	2–3	2–1	0–2	3–1	0–1	—	1–3	0–3	1–2	1–3	1–1	3–1	1–3
Odd Grenland	0–5	2–2	4–1	4–1	2–2	2–1	3–1	—	0–1	3–0	3–0	4–2	0–0	0–1
Rosenborg	4–0	3–3	3–1	2–2	1–1	2–1	6–0	2–1	—	3–1	0–1	4–0	3–0	1–1
Sogndal	3–2	4–3	1–4	2–2	1–0	3–4	3–1	3–3	1–6	—	1–0	5–1	0–3	0–1
Stabæk	2–1	2–1	4–0	3–2	2–5	0–1	2–1	1–0	3–0	4–0	—	4–0	0–3	0–3
Strømsgodset	1–4	2–6	4–0	1–2	3–3	1–1	2–4	0–2	2–5	2–2	2–1	—	0–0	3–3
Tromsø	1–1	2–0	2–2	0–3	2–3	0–2	0–1	0–3	1–3	2–3	0–2	0–1	—	1–0
Viking	2–2	0–2	1–0	3–2	2–0	1–1	2–1	1–0	4–3	2–0	1–1	1–1	4–0	—

Source: NIFS (in Norwegian)
Legend: Blue = home team win; Yellow = draw; Red = away team win.

== Season statistics ==
=== Top scorers ===
Rank	Player	Club	Goals
1	(Norway) Thorstein Helstad	Brann	17
1	(Norway) Frode Johnsen	Rosenborg	17
1	(Australia) Clayton Zane	Lillestrøm	17
4	(Norway) Harald Martin Brattbakk	Rosenborg	15
5	(Norway) Jostein Flo	Strømsgodset	14
5	(Norway) Erik Nevland	Viking	14
7	(Sweden) Magnus Powell	Lillestrøm	13
8	(Norway) Bengt Sæternes	Bodø/Glimt	11
9	(Norway) Petter Furuseth	Brann	10
9	(Norway) Magne Hoseth	Molde	10
9	(Norway) Raymond Kvisvik	Brann	10
9	(Norway) Kim Larsen	Odd Grenland	10
9	(Norway) Trond Fredrik Ludvigsen	Bodø/Glimt	10

=== Attendances ===
Pos	Team	Total	High	Low	Average	Change
1	Brann	163,760	19,308	9,067	12,597	+10.6%
2	Rosenborg	156,904	16,400	9,614	12,070	+1.1%
3	Viking	102,535	13,810	4,420	7,887	+18.4%
4	Lillestrøm	86,822	11,782	4,075	6,679	+40.7%
5	Molde	85,816	11,167	4,883	6,601	−3.2%
6	Odd Grenland	65,688	6,015	3,950	5,053	+5.4%
7	Stabæk	54,967	6,174	2,711	4,228	+12.2%
8	Lyn	54,607	7,579	2,534	4,201	n/a^{1}
9	Bodø/Glimt	49,812	5,003	3,237	3,832	+20.8%
10	Tromsø	46,029	5,553	2,250	3,541	−9.8%
11	Strømsgodset	44,734	5,986	2,121	3,441	n/a^{1}
12	Bryne	38,417	8,919	1,765	2,955	−17.9%
13	Moss	35,485	4,811	1,343	2,730	0.0%
14	Sogndal	29,682	4,512	966	2,283	n/a^{1}
	League total	1,015,258	19,308	966	5,578	−2.6%

Source: nifs.no
Notes:
1: Team played last season in 1. divisjon.
