= 2024 Odds BK season =

Odd
2024 season
- Chairman: Trond Haukvik
- Manager: Kenneth Dokken
- Stadium: Skagerak Arena
- Eliteserien: 16th (relegated)
- Norwegian Cup: Third round
- Top goalscorer: League: Mikael Ingebrigtsen (5); All: Mikael Ingebrigtsen; Faniel Tewelde (5)
Home colours	Away colours

The 2024 season is Odds BK's 130th season in existence and the club's 17th consecutive season in the top flight of Norwegian football. In addition to the domestic league, Odds BK participated in this season's edition of the Norwegian Football Cup.

== Players ==
As of 26 February 2024

Note: Flags indicate national team as defined under FIFA eligibility rules; some limited exceptions apply. Players may hold more than one non-FIFA nationality.

No.	Pos.	Nation	Player
1	GK	NOR	André Hansen
2	DF	NOR	Espen Ruud
3	DF	NOR	Josef Baccay
4	DF	SWE	Leon Hien
5	DF	FIN	Tony Miettinen
6	FW	NOR	Tobias Svendsen
7	MF	NOR	Filip Rønningen Jørgensen
8	MF	NOR	Etzaz Hussain
9	FW	NOR	Ole Erik Midtskogen
10	FW	NOR	Mikael Ingebrigtsen
11	FW	NOR	Faniel Tewelde
13	DF	NOR	Samuel Skree Skjeldal
14	DF	SRB	Mihajlo Ivančević (on loan from OB)

No.	Pos.	Nation	Player
15	DF	NOR	Sondre Solholm Johansen
16	DF	NOR	Casper Glenna Andersen
17	MF	GHA	Solomon Owusu
18	FW	NOR	Syver Aas
19	FW	NOR	Torgeir Børven
20	MF	NOR	Thomas Rekdal
21	DF	NOR	Steffen Hagen (captain)
22	FW	GHA	Abdul Zakaria Mugees
23	FW	NOR	Anders Ryste
25	DF	NOR	Godwill Fabio Ambrose
26	DF	NOR	Jesper Skau
29	FW	NOR	Bork Bang-Kittilsen
30	GK	NOR	Peder Klausen

== Transfers ==
=== Winter ===
In: Note: Flags indicate national team as defined under FIFA eligibility rules; some limited exceptions apply. Players may hold more than one non-FIFA nationality.

No.	Pos.	Nation	Player
1	GK	NOR	André Hansen (from Rosenborg)
5	DF	FIN	Tony Miettinen (from (Finland) KuPS)
8	MF	NOR	Etzaz Hussain (from (Cyprus) Apollon Limassol)
14	DF	SRB	Mihajlo Ivančević (on loan from (Denmark) OB)
19	FW	NOR	Torgeir Børven (from Vålerenga)
25	DF	NOR	Godwill Ambrose (from Gjøvik-Lyn)
27	MF	NOR	Oliver Jordan Hagen (promoted from junior squad)

Out: Note: Flags indicate national team as defined under FIFA eligibility rules; some limited exceptions apply. Players may hold more than one non-FIFA nationality.

No.	Pos.	Nation	Player
1	GK	NOR	Per Kristian Bråtveit (to Strømsgodset)
5	DF	FIN	Diogo Tomas (from (Finland) HJK)
6	MF	GHA	Leonard Owusu (to (Serbia) Partizan)
23	FW	NOR	Anders Hartveit Ryste (on loan to Notodden)
24	MF	NOR	Dennis Gjengaar (to (United States) New York Red Bulls)
—	GK	NOR	Sondre Rossbach (to Stabæk, previously on loan at (Sweden) Degerfors)
—	FW	NOR	Abel William Stensrud (to (Netherlands) TOP Oss, previously on loan at Moss)

== Competitions ==
=== Overview ===
Competition	First match	Last match	Starting round	Final position	Record							
Competition	First match	Last match	Starting round	Final position	Pld	W	D	L	GF	GA	GD	Win %
Eliteserien	31 March 2024	1 December 2024	Matchday 1	16th	30	5	8	17	26	54	−28	16.67
Norwegian Cup	10 April 2024	1 May 2024	First round	Third round	3	2	0	1	8	6	+2	66.67
Total					33	7	8	18	34	60	−26	21.21

Last updated: 1 December 2024
Source: Soccerway

=== Eliteserien ===
==== League table ====
Pos	Team	Pld	W	D	L	GF	GA	GD	Pts	Qualification or relegation
12	HamKam	30	8	9	13	34	39	−5	33	
13	Tromsø	30	9	6	15	34	44	−10	33	
14	Haugesund (O)	30	9	6	15	29	46	−17	33	Qualification for the relegation play-offs
15	Lillestrøm (R)	30	7	3	20	33	63	−30	24	Relegation to First Division
16	Odd (R)	30	5	8	17	26	54	−28	23	Relegation to First Division

Source: Football Association of Norway (in Norwegian)
Rules for classification: 1) Points; 2) Goal difference; 3) Goals scored; 4) Head-to-head points; 5) Head-to-head goal difference; 6) Head-to-head goals scored.
(O) Play-off winners; (R) Relegated

==== Results summary ====
Overall								Home						Away					
Pld	W	D	L	GF	GA	GD	Pts	W	D	L	GF	GA	GD	W	D	L	GF	GA	GD
30	5	8	17	26	54	−28	23	3	4	8	16	29	−13	2	4	9	10	25	−15

Last updated: 1 December 2024.

==== Results by round ====
Round	1	2	3	4	5	6	7	8	9	10	11	12	13	14	15	16	17	18	19	20	21	22	23	24	25	26	27	28	29	30
Ground	H	A	H	A	H	H	A	H	A	H	A	H	A	H	A	H	A	H	A	H	A	H	A	H	A	A	H	A	H	A
Result	L	W	D	L	D	L	L	L	D	W	D	D	L	L	L	W	W	D	L	L	L	W	D	L	D	L	L	L	L	L
Position	11	7	7	12	12	13	15	16	16	15	15	13	15	16	16	16	14	14	15	16	16	16	15	15	15	16	16	16	16	16

A = Away; H = Home; W = Win; D = Draw; L = Loss

==== Matches ====
The league fixtures were announced on 20 December 2023.

31 March 2024 1	Odd	1–2	Haugesund	Skien
18:00 CEST (UTC+2)	Ruud (yellow card) 19'; Miettinen 51'; Ingebrigtsen (yellow card) 78'	Report	Leite 39'; Niyukuri (yellow card) 70'; Eskesen (yellow card) 87'; Seone 90+2'; Liseth (yellow card) 90+6'	Stadium: Skagerak Arena; Attendance: 5,649; Referee: Marius Hansen Grøtta

7 April 2024 2	Sarpsborg 08	0–1	Odd	Sarpsborg
17:00 CEST (UTC+2)	Christiansen (yellow card) 58'; Berget (penalty missed) 80'	Report	Tewelde 23'; Owusu (yellow card) 52'; Miettinen (yellow card) 78'; Baccay (yellow card) 87'; Svendsen (yellow card) 90+1'	Stadium: Sarpsborg Stadion; Attendance: 4,749; Referee: Rohit Saggi

14 April 2024 3	Odd	2–2	Sandefjord	Skien
17:00 CEST (UTC+2)	Bang-Kittilsen 28'; Owusu (yellow card) 57'; Aas 90+7'	Report	Berglie 25' (yellow card) 90+4'; Kristiansen 58'; Nilsson (yellow card) 84'	Stadium: Skagerak Arena; Attendance: 5,389; Referee: Christian Moen

17 April 2024 17	Molde	1–2	Odd	Molde
18:00 CEST (UTC+2)	Eriksen 33' (yellow card) 90+5'	Report	Bang-Kittilsen 35'; Svendsen (yellow card) 58'; Tewelde 70'	Stadium: Aker Stadion; Attendance: 5,753; Referee: Daniel Higraff

21 April 2024 4	Brann	2–0	Odd	Bergen
17:00 CEST (UTC+2)	Kornvig 29' (pen.); Kartum (yellow card) 31'; Heggebø 90+4'	Report	Baccay (yellow card) 69'; Hussain (yellow card) 86'	Stadium: Brann Stadion; Attendance: 15,564; Referee: Mohammad Usman Aslam

28 April 2024 5	Odd	3–3	Viking	Skien
19:15 CEST (UTC+2)	Hussain (yellow card) 20'; Jørgensen (yellow card) 23'; Svendsen 30', 35'; Ivančević (yellow card) 89' (yellow-red card) 90+6'; Ingebrigtsen 90+7'	Report	Tangen 25'; D'Agostino (yellow card) 28'; Salvesen (yellow card) 75'; Christiansen 87'; Tripic 90+4'	Stadium: Skagerak Arena; Attendance: 4,337; Referee: Sigurd Smehus Kringstad

5 May 2024 6	Odd	0–2	Fredrikstad	Skien
17:00 CEST (UTC+2)		Report	Aukland (yellow card) 74'; Bjørlo 79'; Sørløkk 90+3'	Stadium: Skagerak Arena; Attendance: 5,154; Referee: Svein Tore Sinnes

12 May 2024 7	Tromsø	4–0	Odd	Tromsø
17:00 CEST (UTC+2)	R. Y. Jenssen 49'; Erlien 51'; Antonsen 70'; Norheim 74'	Report		Stadium: Romssa Arena; Attendance: 3,637; Referee: Marius Hansen Grøtta

16 May 2024 8	Odd	0–4	Molde	Skien
18:00 CEST (UTC+2)	Miettinen (red card) 31'; Skau (yellow card) 61'; Hussain (yellow card) 62'	Report	Eikrem 17', 33'; Amundsen (yellow card) 51'; Løvik 73'; Samuel 81'	Stadium: Skagerak Arena; Attendance: 6,325; Referee: Tore Hansen

20 May 2024 9	KFUM Oslo	0–0	Odd	Oslo
17:00 CEST (UTC+2)	Aleesami (yellow card) 34'; Hickson (yellow card) 37'; Saldaña (yellow card) 90+1'	Report	Midtskogen (yellow card) 30'; Ivančević (yellow card) 74'	Stadium: KFUM Arena; Attendance: 2,409; Referee: Kristoffer Hagenes

26 May 2024 10	Odd	2–1	Lillestrøm	Skien
17:00 CEST (UTC+2)	Hussain (yellow card) 15'; Midtskogen 77'; Jørgensen (yellow card) 90+1'; Njie 90+5'	Report	Lundemo (yellow card) 11'; Garnås 90+6'	Stadium: Skagerak Arena; Attendance: 4,529; Referee: Daniel Higraff

2 June 2024 11	Strømsgodset	1–1	Odd	Drammen
17:00 CEST (UTC+2)	Melkersen 15'; Taaje (yellow card) 36'	Report	Tewelde 54'; Miettinen (yellow card) 55'	Stadium: Marienlyst Stadion; Attendance: 5,381; Referee: Steinar Hauge

28 June 2024 12	Odd	1–1	Kristiansund	Skien
19:00 CEST (UTC+2)	Ruud (penalty missed) 26'; Hussain (yellow card) 69'; Ingebrigtsen 69'	Report	Bruseth 34'; Aasbak (yellow card) 67'; Isaksen (yellow card) 89'	Stadium: Skagerak Arena; Attendance: 4,018; Referee: Kristoffer Hagenes

7 July 2024 13	Rosenborg	2–1	Odd	Trondheim
19:15 CEST (UTC+2)	Nypan 26'; Henriksen 38' (yellow card) 39'; Tagseth (yellow card) 90+2'; Tangvik (yellow card) 90+8'	Report	Hussain (yellow card) 9'; Miettinen (yellow card) 45+1'; Baccay (yellow card) 65'; Bang-Kittilsen (yellow card) 78'; Ingebrigtsen 81'; Solholm Johansen (yellow card) 84'	Stadium: Lerkendal Stadion; Attendance: 10,434; Referee: Svein Tore Sinnes

13 July 2024 14	Odd	1–2	HamKam	Skien
17:00 CEST (UTC+2)	Ingebrigtsen 29'; Ivančević (yellow card) 84'	Report	Norheim 24'; Jónsson (yellow card) 31'; Sørås 63'	Stadium: Skagerak Arena; Attendance: 3,783; Referee: Sigurd Kringstad

19 July 2024 15	Bodø/Glimt	3–1	Odd	Bodø
19:00 CEST (UTC+2)	Mikkelsen 12'; Gundersen (yellow card) 47'; Sjøvold 53'; Bjørkan 66'; Kapskarmo (yellow card) 86'	Report	Skjeldal 39'; Ruud (yellow card) 44'; Miettinen (yellow card) 72'	Stadium: Aspmyra Stadion; Attendance: 6,888; Referee: Christian Moen

28 July 2024 16	Odd	2–0	Strømsgodset	Skien
17:00 CEST (UTC+2)	Ingebrigtsen (yellow card) 31'; Jørgensen 38'; Svendsen 43'; Ruud (yellow card) 90+1'	Report	Danso (yellow card) 40'; Therkelsen (yellow card) 79'; Sørmo (yellow card) 90+5'	Stadium: Skagerak Arena; Attendance: 3,781; Referee: Sivert Amland

17 April 2024 17	Molde	1–2	Odd	Molde
18:00 CEST (UTC+2)	Eriksen 33' (yellow card) 90'	Report	Bang-Kittilsen 36'; Svendsen (yellow card) 58'; Tewelde 70'	Stadium: Aker Stadion; Attendance: 5,753; Referee: Daniel Higraff

11 August 2024 18	Odd	1–1	Sarpsborg 08	Skien
17:00 CEST (UTC+2)	Ingebrigtsen 30' (pen.); Jørgensen (yellow card) 49'; Miettinen (yellow card) 90+3'	Report	Koch (yellow card) 28'; Christiansen 51'	Stadium: Skagerak Arena; Attendance: 4,417; Referee: Rohit Saggi

18 August 2024 19	HamKam	1–0	Odd	Hamar
17:00 CEST (UTC+2)	Sørås (yellow card) 53'; Mawa 62'; Onsrud (yellow card) 79'	Report		Stadium: Briskeby Stadion; Attendance: 4,209; Referee: Tore Hansen

25 August 2024 20	Odd	1–3	Rosenborg	Skien
17:00 CEST (UTC+2)	Ruud (yellow card) 19'; Børven 50'	Report	Holm 26'; Pereira (yellow card) 40'; Andersson (yellow card) 60'; Broholm 65', 85'	Stadium: Skagerak Arena; Attendance: 5,048; Referee: Svein Tore Sinnes

31 August 2024 21	Fredrikstad	2–0	Odd	Fredrikstad
18:00 CEST (UTC+2)	Bjørlo 59' (pen.); Eid (yellow card) 82'; Kjelsrud Johansen 82'	Report	Aas (yellow card) 32'	Stadium: Fredrikstad Stadion; Attendance: 5,976; Referee: Marius Hansen Grøtta

15 September 2024 22	Odd	1–0	Tromsø	Skien
14:30 CEST (UTC+2)	Hussain (yellow card) 19'; Børven 72'	Report	Cornic (yellow card) 4'; Barry (yellow card) 64'	Stadium: Skagerak Arena; Attendance: 4,078; Referee: Mathias Støfringshaug

22 September 2024 23	Kristiansund	0–0	Odd	Kristiansund
17:00 CEST (UTC+2)		Report	Mugeese (yellow card) 83'; Jørgensen (yellow card) 90'; Hien (yellow card) 90+2'	Stadium: Kristiansund Stadion; Attendance: 3,182; Referee: Kristoffer Hagenes

29 September 2024 24	Odd	1–3	KFUM Oslo	Skien
17:00 CEST (UTC+2)	Bang-Kittilsen 16'; Ruud (yellow card) 40'	Report	Njie 26'; Rasch 42'; Nuñez 73'; Nouri (yellow card) 79'	Stadium: Skagerak Arena; Attendance: 4,743; Referee: Christian Moen

20 October 2024 25	Viking	3–3	Odd	Stavanger
17:00 CEST (UTC+2)	Heggheim 35'; Kvia-Egeskog (yellow card) 40'; Urbančič (yellow card) 53'; Salvesen 79'; D'Agostino 90+5'	Report	Ree 15' (o.g.); Sinyan 19'; Fransson (yellow card) 30'; Baccay (yellow card) 45+1'; Haug (yellow card) 67'; Njie 90' (yellow card) 90+1'; Ruud (yellow card) 90+2'	Stadium: SR-Bank Arena; Attendance: 6,478; Referee: Svein Tore Sinnes

27 October 2024 26	Lillestrøm	3–0	Odd	Lillestrøm
17:00 CET (UTC+1)	Vá 39', 73' (yellow card) 52'; Røssing 45+2'; Jeahze (yellow card) 78'	Report	Solholm Johansen (yellow card) 15'	Stadium: Åråsen Stadion; Attendance: 7,046; Referee: Tore Hansen

3 November 2024 27	Odd	0–3	Brann	Skien
17:00 CET (UTC+1)		Report	Helland 42' (yellow card) 84'; Heggebø 44', 54'	Stadium: Skagerak Arena; Attendance: 5,752; Referee: Mohammad Usman Aslam

10 November 2024 28	Sandefjord	1–0	Odd	Sandefjord
17:00 CET (UTC+1)	Markovic 58'; Dunsby (yellow card) 69'; Risan Mørk (yellow card) 90'	Report	Solholm Johansen (red card) 90'	Stadium: Jotun Arena; Attendance: 5,497; Referee: Daniel Higraff

23 November 2024 29	Odd	0–2	Bodø/Glimt	Skien
17:00 CET (UTC+1)	Hien (yellow card) 24'; Midtskogen (yellow card) 68'	Report	Berg 2'; Hauge 55'	Stadium: Skagerak Arena; Attendance: 3,971; Referee: Christian Moen

1 December 2024 30	Haugesund	2–1	Odd	Haugesund
17:00 CET (UTC+1)	Samuelsen 72'; Bærtelsen 79' (pen.)	Report	Hagen 29'; Aas (yellow card) 53'; Owusu (yellow card) 78'	Stadium: Haugesund Sparebank Arena; Attendance: 3,964; Referee: Mohammad Usman Aslam

=== Norwegian Football Cup ===
10 April 2024 First round	Åskollen	1–3	Odd	Drammen
18:00 CEST (UTC+2)	Johanesen (yellow card) 45' (goal) 52'; Raaholt (yellow card) 56'; Brovina (yellow card) 65'	Report	Ingebrigtsen 9', 49' (pen.); Skau 42'	Stadium: Gulskogen Arena; Referee: Herman Holthe

24 April 2024 Second round	Pors	0–1	Odd	Porsgrunn
18:00 CEST (UTC+2)	Svarteberg (yellow card) 22'; Garstad (yellow card) 36'	Report	Ivančević 72'	Stadium: Pors Stadion; Attendance: 2,123; Referee: Eivind Bodding

1 May 2024 Third round	Sandnes Ulf	5–4	Odd	Sandnes
16:00 CEST (UTC+2)	Braut 20'; Kvernstuen 35', 64'; Nyhagen 45+2'; Sakor 72' (yellow card) 81'; Berger (yellow card) 82'; Memedov (yellow card) 88'	Report	Ivančević 9', 68' (yellow card) 33'; Tewelde 25', 82' (pen.)	Stadium: Øster Hus Arena; Attendance: 1,738; Referee: Jan Morten Tennøy
