= 2023 Odds BK season =

Odd
2023 season
- Chairman: Trond Haukvik
- Manager: Pål Arne Johansen
- Stadium: Skagerak Arena
- Eliteserien: 10th
- 2022 Norwegian Cup: Fourth round
- 2023 Norwegian Cup: Third round
- Top goalscorer: League: Filip Rønningen Jørgensen (7); All: Filip Rønningen Jørgensen (7)
- Biggest win: Urædd 1–7 Odd
- Biggest defeat: Sandefjord 4–1 Odd
Home colours	Away colours

The 2023 season was Odds BK's 129th season in existence and the club's 16th consecutive season in the top flight of Norwegian football. In addition to the domestic league, Odds BK participated in this season's edition of the Norwegian Football Cup.

== Players ==
=== First team squad ===
As of 31 March 2023

Note: Flags indicate national team as defined under FIFA eligibility rules; some limited exceptions apply. Players may hold more than one non-FIFA nationality.

No.	Pos.	Nation	Player
1	GK	NOR	Per Kristian Bråtveit
2	DF	NOR	Espen Ruud
3	DF	NOR	Josef Baccay
4	DF	SWE	Leon Hien
5	DF	FIN	Diogo Tomas
6	MF	GHA	Leonard Owusu
7	MF	NOR	Filip Rønningen Jørgensen
10	FW	NOR	Mikael Ingebrigtsen
11	FW	NOR	Ole Erik Midtskogen
14	FW	NOR	Tobias Svendsen
15	DF	NOR	Sondre Solholm Johansen
16	DF	NOR	Casper Glenna Andersen

No.	Pos.	Nation	Player
17	MF	GHA	Solomon Owusu
18	FW	NOR	Syver Aas
19	FW	NOR	Faniel Tewelde
20	MF	NOR	Thomas Rekdal
21	DF	NOR	Steffen Hagen (captain)
22	FW	GHA	Abdul Zakaria Mugees
23	FW	NOR	Anders Ryste
24	FW	NOR	Dennis Gjengaar
26	DF	NOR	Jesper Skau
29	FW	NOR	Bork Bang-Kittilsen
30	GK	NOR	Peder Klausen

=== Out on loan ===
Note: Flags indicate national team as defined under FIFA eligibility rules; some limited exceptions apply. Players may hold more than one non-FIFA nationality.

No.	Pos.	Nation	Player
9	FW	NOR	Abel Stensrud (at Bryne)
—	GK	NOR	Sondre Rossbach (at Degerfors)

== Transfers ==
=== Winter ===
In: Note: Flags indicate national team as defined under FIFA eligibility rules; some limited exceptions apply. Players may hold more than one non-FIFA nationality.

No.	Pos.	Nation	Player
5	DF	FIN	Diogo Tomas (from (Finland) KuPS)
6	MF	GHA	Leonard Owusu (from (Canada) Vancouver Whitecaps)
—	DF	SWE	Leon Hien (from (Sweden) Hammarby Talang)
11	FW	NOR	Ole Erik Midtskogen (from Kjelsås)
13	DF	NOR	Samuel Skree Skjeldal (promoted from junior squad)
15	DF	NOR	Sondre Solholm Johansen (from (Scotland) Motherwell)
16	DF	NOR	Casper Glenna (promoted from junior squad)
23	FW	NOR	Anders Hartveit Ryste (promoted from junior squad)
29	FW	NOR	Bork Bang-Kittilsen (promoted from junior squad)

Out: Note: Flags indicate national team as defined under FIFA eligibility rules; some limited exceptions apply. Players may hold more than one non-FIFA nationality.

No.	Pos.	Nation	Player
1	GK	NOR	Sondre Rossbach (on loan to (Sweden) Degerfors, previously on loan at Vålerenga)
4	DF	NOR	Odin Bjørtuft (to Bodø/Glimt)
5	DF	SVK	Ivan Mesík (loan return to (Denmark) Nordsjælland)
6	MF	NOR	Magnus Lekven (retired)
9	FW	KOS	Flamur Kastrati (retired)
10	FW	NOR	Adama Diomande (to (Canada) Toronto)
11	FW	FRO	Gilli Rólantsson (to (Faroe Islands) TB Tvøroyri)
13	DF	NOR	Kevin Egell-Johnsen (to Arendal)
16	MF	NOR	Vebjørn Hoff (loan return to Rosenborg)
22	FW	NOR	Abel William Stensrud (on loan to Bryne)
25	FW	AUT	Philipp Zulechner (released)

=== Summer ===
In: Note: Flags indicate national team as defined under FIFA eligibility rules; some limited exceptions apply. Players may hold more than one non-FIFA nationality.

No.	Pos.	Nation	Player
1	GK	NOR	Per Kristian Bråtveit (from (Denmark) AGF)
14	FW	NOR	Tobias Svendsen (from Lillestrøm)
18	MF	NOR	Syver Aas (loan return from Skeid)
22	FW	GHA	Zakaria Mageese (from (Israel) Ashdod)

Out: Note: Flags indicate national team as defined under FIFA eligibility rules; some limited exceptions apply. Players may hold more than one non-FIFA nationality.

No.	Pos.	Nation	Player
1	GK	SWE	Leopold Wahlstedt (to (England) Blackburn Rovers)
8	FW	SRB	Milan Jevtović (to (Vietnam) Ha Noi)
14	MF	NOR	Conrad Wallem (to (Czech Republic) Slavia Prague)
18	MF	NOR	Syver Aas (on loan to Skeid)
–	FW	NOR	Abel William Stensrud (on loan to Moss, previously on loan at Bryne)

== Pre-season and friendlies ==
Win Draw Loss Fixtures

4 March 2023 Friendly	Odd (Norway)	1–0	(Norway) Strømsgodset	Skien
16:00 CET (UTC+1)	Midtskogen 76'			Stadium: Skagerak Arena

1 April 2023 Friendly	Odd (Norway)	0–2	(Norway) Lillestrøm	Skien
15:00 CEST (UTC+2)			Åsen 53'; Ibrahimaj 61'	Stadium: Skagerak Arena

== Competitions ==
=== Overview ===
Competition	First match	Last match	Starting round	Final position	Record							
Competition	First match	Last match	Starting round	Final position	Pld	W	D	L	GF	GA	GD	Win %
Eliteserien	10 April 2023	3 December 2023	Matchday 1	10th	30	10	8	12	42	44	−2	33.33
2022 Norwegian Cup	12 March 2023		Fourth round	Fourth round	1	0	0	1	1	4	−3	0.00
2023 Norwegian Cup	24 May 2023	7 June 2023	First round	Third round	2	1	0	1	13	6	+7	50.00
Total					33	11	8	14	56	54	+2	33.33

Source: Soccerway

=== Eliteserien ===
==== League table ====
Pos	Team	Pld	W	D	L	GF	GA	GD	Pts
8	Sarpsborg	30	12	5	13	55	52	+3	41
9	Rosenborg	30	11	6	13	46	50	−4	39
10	Odd	30	10	8	12	42	44	−2	38
11	HamKam	30	10	4	16	39	59	−20	34
12	Haugesund	30	9	6	15	34	40	−6	33

Source: Football Association of Norway (in Norwegian)
Rules for classification: 1) Points; 2) Goal difference; 3) Goals scored; 4) Head-to-head points; 5) Head-to-head goal difference; 6) Head-to-head goals scored.

==== Results summary ====
Overall								Home						Away					
Pld	W	D	L	GF	GA	GD	Pts	W	D	L	GF	GA	GD	W	D	L	GF	GA	GD
30	10	8	12	42	44	−2	38	7	4	4	22	15	+7	3	4	8	20	29	−9

==== Results by round ====
Round	1	2	3	4	5	6	7	8	9	10	11	12	13	14	15	16	17	18	19	20	21	22	23	24	25	26	27	28	29	30
Ground	A	H	A	H	A	H	A	H	A	H	A	A	H	A	H	A	H	A	H	A	H	A	H	H	A	H	A	H	A	H
Result	D	W	D	D	W	L	L	D	L	W	W	L	L	W	W	L	W	L	L	D	W	L	D	D	L	W	L	L	D	W
Position	8	2	5	7	2	6	9	9	11	10	8	9	9	9	7	8	7	7	8	9	8	9	8	8	8	8	10	10	10	10

A = Away; H = Home; W = Win; D = Draw; L = Loss

==== Matches ====
The league fixtures were announced on 9 December 2022.

10 April 2023 1	Stabæk	0–0	Odd	Bærum
17:00 CEST (UTC+2)	Skovgaard (yellow card) 85'	Report	Wallem (yellow card) 81'	Stadium: Nadderud Stadion; Attendance: 3,308; Referee: Svein Tore Sinnes

16 April 2023 2	Odd	2–0	Brann	Skien
17:00 CEST (UTC+2)	Jørgensen 45'; Ingebrigtsen 70'; Wallem (yellow card) 89'	Report	Nilsen (yellow card) 57'; Heggebø (yellow card) 90+4'	Stadium: Skagerak Arena; Attendance: 5,781; Referee: Espen Eskås

23 April 2023 3	Sarpsborg 08	0–0	Odd	Sarpsborg
17:00 CEST (UTC+2)		Report	Tomas (yellow card) 30'; S. Owusu (yellow card) 44'	Stadium: Sarpsborg Stadion; Attendance: 4,330; Referee: Svein Oddvar Moen

30 April 2023 4	Odd	0–0	Rosenborg	Skien
19:15 CEST (UTC+2)	Ingebrigtsen (yellow card) 44'; Wallem (yellow card) 49'	Report	Väänanen (yellow card) 28'; Henriksen (yellow card) 90+3'	Stadium: Skagerak Arena; Attendance: 8,331; Referee: Daniel Higraff

3 May 2023 18	Bodø/Glimt	2–0	Odd	Bodø
18:00 CEST (UTC+2)	Pemi (yellow card) 31'; Bjørtuft (yellow card) 48'; Vetlesen 55'; Pellegrino 82'	Report	S. Owusu (yellow card) 17'; Wallem (yellow card) 23'	Stadium: Aspmyra Stadion; Attendance: 5,944; Referee: Sivert Øksnes Amland

7 May 2023 5	Tromsø	0–1	Odd	Tromsø
17:00 CEST (UTC+2)	Koskela (yellow card) 86'	Report	Ruud (yellow card) 35'; Jevtović (yellow card) 39'; Bang-Kittilsen 80'; Tomas (yellow card) 88'	Stadium: Romssa Arena; Attendance: 3,800; Referee: Marius Hansen Grøtta

12 May 2023 6	Odd	0–1	Lillestrøm	Skien
19:00 CEST (UTC+2)	Hagen (yellow card) 71'	Report	Garnås (yellow card) 35'; Hoff (yellow card) 53'; Adams 90+3'	Stadium: Skagerak Arena; Attendance: 6,396; Referee: Svein Tore Sinnes

16 May 2023 7	Viking	3–2	Odd	Stavanger
18:00 CEST (UTC+2)	Tripić 62' (pen.), 81' (pen.); Svendsen 87'	Report	Jørgensen 10'; L. Owusu (yellow card) 24'; Wallem 45+3'; Hagen (yellow card) 65'; Baccay (yellow card) 73'	Stadium: Viking Stadion; Attendance: 15,900; Referee: Kristoffer Hagenes

29 May 2023 8	Odd	1–1	Strømsgodset	Skien
17:00 CEST (UTC+2)	Jevtović 60'; Tomas (yellow card) 74'; L. Owusu (yellow card) 79'	Report	Mehnert 61'; Gulliksen (yellow card) 74'	Stadium: Skagerak Arena; Attendance: 5,088; Referee: Jan Morten Tennøy

4 June 2023 9	Sandefjord	4–1	Odd	Sandefjord
17:00 CEST (UTC+2)	Al-Saed 11', 65'; Koomson 53'; Hagen 56' (o.g.); Taaje (yellow card) 78'	Report	S. Owusu (yellow card) 15'; Bang-Kittilsen (yellow card) 45'; Tomas (yellow card) 67'; Tewelde 90+2'	Stadium: Release Arena; Attendance: 4,342; Referee: Mohammad Usman Aslam

11 June 2023 10	Odd	1–0	Molde	Skien
17:00 CEST (UTC+2)	Johansen (yellow card) 29'; Midtskogen (yellow card) 33' (goal) 78'; L. Owusu (yellow card) 50'; Wahlstedt (yellow card) 90+3'	Report	Hagelskjær (yellow card) 48'; Eikrem (yellow card) 90'; Linnes (yellow card) 90+2'; Hansen (yellow card) 90+3'	Stadium: Skagerak Arena; Attendance: 4,489; Referee: Tore Hansen

25 June 2023 11	HamKam	0–1	Odd	Hamar
17:00 CEST (UTC+2)	Opshal (yellow card) 69'	Report	Wallem (yellow card) 65'; Hien 83'	Stadium: Briskeby Stadion; Attendance: 4,037; Referee: Kristoffer Hagenes

2 July 2023 12	Haugesund	2–1	Odd	Haugesund
17:00 CEST (UTC+2)	Pajaziti (yellow card) 19'; Therkildsen (yellow card) 29'; Njie 41'; Krygård (yellow card) 68'; Samuelsen 80'	Report	Johansen 27' (yellow card) 38'; Wallem (yellow card) 90'; Hien (yellow card) 90+1'	Stadium: Haugesund Stadion; Attendance: 4,101; Referee: Ajdin Medic

9 July 2023 13	Odd	0–2	Bodø/Glimt	Skien
17:00 CEST (UTC+2)	Baccay (yellow card) 43'; Hien (yellow card) 90+2'	Report	Grønbæk 27'; Pellegrino 58'; Elabdellaoui (yellow card) 75'	Stadium: Skagerak Arena; Attendance: 5,474; Referee: Mohammad Usman Aslam

16 July 2023 14	Aalesund	0–3	Odd	Ålesund
17:00 CEST (UTC+2)	Fällman (yellow card) 32'; Atanga (yellow card) 63'; Barmen (yellow card) 65'; Lunding (yellow card) 90+5'	Report	Ruud (yellow card) 45' (goal) 46', 70'; Tomas 75'	Stadium: Color Line Stadion; Attendance: 4,461; Referee: Rohit Saggi

23 July 2023 15	Odd	2–1	Vålerenga	Skien
17:00 CEST (UTC+2)	Juklerød 33' (o.g.); Ruud 81' (pen.)	Report	Wahlstedt 49' (o.g.); Hedenstad (yellow card) 60' (yellow-red card) 79'	Stadium: Skagerak Arena; Attendance: 5,604; Referee: Sivert Øksnes Amland

30 July 2023 16	Rosenborg	3–2	Odd	Trondheim
17:00 CEST (UTC+2)	Sæter 47' 63' (pen.); Väänänen (yellow card) 49'; Tagseth (yellow card) 66'; Yttergård Jenssen 71'	Report	Midtskogen (yellow card) 15'; Ingebrigtsen 22'; S. Owusu (red card) 66'	Stadium: Lerkendal Stadion; Attendance: 12,601; Referee: Christian Moen

6 August 2023 17	Odd	4–0	Stabæk	Skien
17:00 CEST (UTC+2)	Johansen 20' (red card) 81'; Gjengaar 32'; Midtskogen (yellow card) 52'; Rekdal 60'; Tomas (yellow card) 71'; Tewelde 90+7'	Report	Wangberg (yellow card) 88'	Stadium: Skagerak Arena; Attendance: 4,758; Referee: Svein Tore Sinnes

19 August 2023 19	Odd	0–3	Sarpsborg 08	Skien
18:00 CEST (UTC+2)	Ruud (yellow card) 61'; Hagen (yellow card) 87'	Report	Maigaard 38', 53'; Meister 90+3'	Stadium: Skagerak Arena; Attendance: 4,373; Referee: Marius Hansen Grøtta

27 August 2023 20	Vålerenga	2–2	Odd	Oslo
17:00 CEST (UTC+2)	Solholm Johansen 19' (o.g.); Bitri 39'	Report	Gjengaar 8'; Midtskogen 67'; Mugeese (yellow card) 84'; Ruud (yellow card) 90'	Stadium: Intility Arena; Attendance: 8,368; Referee: Kristoffer Hagenes

3 September 2023 21	Odd	3–2	Sandefjord	Skien
17:00 CEST (UTC+2)	Jørgensen (yellow card) 20' (goal) 43'; Tewelde 33'; S. Owusu 86'; L. Owusu (yellow card) 90+1'; Hien (yellow card) 90+2'	Report	Nyenetue 16'; Al-Saed 45' (yellow card) 58'	Stadium: Skagerak Arena; Attendance: 4,981; Referee: Ola Hobber Nilsen

16 September 2023 22	Molde	4–1	Odd	Molde
18:00 CEST (UTC+2)	Hestad 30', 43'; Gulbrandsen 70'; Eikrem 79'	Report	Svendsen 38' (yellow card) 83'	Stadium: Aker Stadion; Attendance: 6,118; Referee: Tore Hansen

24 September 2023 23	Odd	1–1	Haugesund	Skien
17:00 CEST (UTC+2)	Ruud 73'; Johansen (yellow card) 82'	Report	Krusnell (yellow card) 41'; Eskesen (yellow card) 45+1'; Fredriksen 54'; Huisman (yellow card) 63'	Stadium: Skagerak Arena; Attendance: 4,500; Referee: Steinar Hauge

7 October 2023 24	Odd	1–1	Viking	Skien
18:00 CEST (UTC+2)	Langås 26' (o.g.); Svendsen (yellow card) 35'; Mugeese (yellow card) 82'; S. Owusu (yellow card) 90+4'	Report	Tangen 5'; Diop (yellow card) 60'	Stadium: Skagerak Arena; Attendance: 5,632; Referee: Kai Erik Steen

22 October 2023 25	Strømsgodset	3–1	Odd	Drammen
17:00 CEST (UTC+2)	Sørmo (yellow card) 15'; Krasniqi (yellow card) 22'; Stengel (yellow card) 52' (goal) 69' (pen.); Andersen 63'; Melkersen 85'	Report	Tewelde 28'; L. Owusu (yellow card) 54'; Tomas (yellow card) 68'; Ruud (yellow card) 76'	Stadium: Marienlyst Stadion; Attendance: 4,634; Referee: Kristoffer Hagenes

29 October 2023 26	Odd	2–0	HamKam	Skien
17:00 CET (UTC+1)	Baccay 2' (yellow card) 45+1'; L. Owusu (yellow card) 11'; Jørgensen 48'	Report		Stadium: Skagerak Arena; Attendance: 4,261; Referee: Mohammad Usman Aslam

5 November 2023 27	Brann	2–1	Odd	Bergen
17:00 CET (UTC+1)	Myhre 57'; Knudsen (yellow card) 59'; Nilsen 62'	Report	Svendsen (yellow card) 53'; Gjengaar (yellow card) 64'; Tewelde 90+4'	Stadium: Brann Stadion; Attendance: 15,098; Referee: Marius Hansen Grøtta

12 November 2023 28	Odd	1–2	Tromsø	Skien
17:00 CET (UTC+1)	Ingebrigtsen 77'	Report	Erlien 12', 60'; Diouf (yellow card) 60'	Stadium: Skagerak Arena; Attendance: 3,894; Referee: Ajdin Medic

26 November 2023 29	Lillestrøm	4–4	Odd	Lillestrøm
17:00 CET (UTC+1)	Åsen 31'; Lehne Olsen 74', 90+12' (pen.); Gabrielsen 76' (yellow card) 86'	Report	Jørgensen 2', 25'; Baccay (yellow card) 18'; Ingebrigtsen 41', 82'; Ruud (yellow card) 60'; L. Owusu (yellow card) 87'; Bråtveit (yellow card) 90+2'; S. Owusu (yellow card) 90+12'	Stadium: Åråsen Stadion; Attendance: 6,025; Referee: Svein Tore Sinnes

3 December 2023 30	Odd	4–1	Aalesund	Skien
17:00 CET (UTC+1)	Diop 13' (o.g.); Ingebrigtsen 31'; Jørgensen 83'; Skau 90+1'	Report	Hammer (yellow card) 24'; Diop 37'; Haram (yellow card) 45+3'; Kristensen (yellow card) 90'	Stadium: Skagerak Arena; Attendance: 3,844; Referee: Kristoffer Hagenes

=== Norwegian Football Cup ===
==== 2022 ====
12 March 2023 Fourth round	Sandefjord	4–1	Odd	Mjøndalen
17:00 CET (UTC+1)	Tveter 4'; Dunsby 10', 26'; Al-Saed 24' (yellow card) 64'; Pålerud (yellow card) 52'	Report	Wallem 81'; Aas (yellow card) 90+2'	Stadium: Consto Arena; Attendance: 397; Referee: Daniel Higraff

==== 2023 ====
24 May 2023 First round	Urædd	1–7	Odd	Porsgrunn
18:00 CEST (UTC+2)	Nordkvelle 78'	Report	Jevtović 13', 21', 31'; Wallem 50', 66'; Tomas 73'; Midtskogen 86'	Stadium: Urædd kunstgress Attendance: 700; Referee: Herman Holthe

1 June 2023 Second round	Notodden	2–5	Odd	Notodden
18:00 CEST (UTC+2)	Frithzell 4' (penalty missed) 20' (yellow card) 80'; Hagen (yellow card) 16'; Gampedalen 90+1'	Report	Jevtović 11'; Johansen (yellow card) 48'; S. Owusu 65'; Midtskogen 74'; Glenna 87'; Tewelde 90+5'	Stadium: Idrettsparken; Attendance: 822; Referee: Eirik Wisted-Thu

7 June 2023 Third round	Sarpsborg 08	3–1	Odd	Sarpsborg
18:00 CEST (UTC+2)	Opseth 42'; Maigaard 45+1' (yellow card) 70'; Overgaard 79'	Report	Midtskogen 78'	Stadium: Sarpsborg Stadion; Attendance: 1,867; Referee: Ola Hobber Nilsen
