= 2022 Odds BK season =

Odd
2022 season
- Chairman: Trond Haukvik
- Manager: Pål Arne Johansen
- Stadium: Skagerak Arena
- Eliteserien: 5th
- 2021 Norwegian Cup: Fourth round
- 2022 Norwegian Cup: Fourth round
- Top goalscorer: League: Milan Jevtović (10); All: Milan Jevtović (11)
Home colours	Away colours

The 2022 season was Odds BK's 128th season in existence and the club's 15th consecutive season in the top flight of Norwegian football. In addition to the domestic league, Odds BK participated in this season's edition of the Norwegian Football Cup.

== Players ==
=== First team squad ===
As of 9 October 2022

Note: Flags indicate national team as defined under FIFA eligibility rules; some limited exceptions apply. Players may hold more than one non-FIFA nationality.

No.	Pos.	Nation	Player
2	DF	NOR	Espen Ruud
3	DF	NOR	Josef Baccay
4	DF	NOR	Odin Bjørtuft
5	DF	SVK	Ivan Mesík (on loan from Nordsjælland)
6	MF	NOR	Magnus Lekven
7	MF	NOR	Filip Rønningen Jørgensen
8	MF	SRB	Milan Jevtović
9	FW	KOS	Flamur Kastrati
10	FW	NOR	Adama Diomande
11	FW	FRO	Gilli Rólantsson
12	GK	SWE	Leopold Wahlstedt
13	DF	NOR	Kevin Egell-Johnsen
14	MF	NOR	Conrad Wallem

No.	Pos.	Nation	Player
15	FW	NOR	Mikael Ingebrigtsen
16	MF	NOR	Vebjørn Hoff (on loan from Rosenborg)
17	MF	GHA	Solomon Owusu
18	FW	NOR	Syver Aas
19	FW	NOR	Faniel Temesgen Tewelde
20	MF	NOR	Thomas Rekdal
21	DF	NOR	Steffen Hagen (captain)
22	FW	NOR	Abel Stensrud
23	FW	NOR	Anders Ryste
24	DF	NOR	Dennis Gjengaar
25	FW	AUT	Philipp Zulechner
26	DF	NOR	Jesper Skau
30	GK	NOR	Peder Klausen

=== Out on loan ===
Note: Flags indicate national team as defined under FIFA eligibility rules; some limited exceptions apply. Players may hold more than one non-FIFA nationality.

No.	Pos.	Nation	Player
1	GK	NOR	Sondre Rossbach (at Vålerenga until 31 December 2022)

== Transfers ==
=== Winter ===
In: Note: Flags indicate national team as defined under FIFA eligibility rules; some limited exceptions apply. Players may hold more than one non-FIFA nationality.

No.	Pos.	Nation	Player
3	DF	NOR	Josef Baccay (from Lillestrøm)
5	DF	SVK	Ivan Mesík (on loan from (Denmark) Nordsjælland)
15	FW	NOR	Mikael Ingebrigtsen (from Tromsø)
22	FW	NOR	Abel Stensrud (from Skeid)
19	FW	NOR	Fenuel Temesgen Tewelde (promoted from junior squad)
24	DF	NOR	Dennis Gjengaar (promoted from junior squad)
26	MF	NOR	Jesper Svenungsen Skau (promoted from junior squad)

Out: Note: Flags indicate national team as defined under FIFA eligibility rules; some limited exceptions apply. Players may hold more than one non-FIFA nationality.

No.	Pos.	Nation	Player
3	DF	NOR	Emil Jonassen (retired)
8	MF	NOR	Markus André Kaasa (to Molde)
13	DF	NOR	Kevin Egell-Johnsen (on loan to Kongsvinger)
15	MF	NOR	Eirik Asante Gayi (to (Sweden) Brage)
17	MF	NOR	Elias Skogvoll (to Tromsdalen)
19	DF	NOR	Thomas Hallstensen (to Egersund, previously on loan at Ull/Kisa)
22	MF	NOR	Kristoffer Larsen (to Åsane)
24	DF	NOR	Bjørn Mæland (to Egersund)
29	FW	NOR	Sander Svendsen (loan return to (Denmark) OB)

=== Summer ===
In: Note: Flags indicate national team as defined under FIFA eligibility rules; some limited exceptions apply. Players may hold more than one non-FIFA nationality.

No.	Pos.	Nation	Player
10	FW	NOR	Adama Diomande (from (Qatar) Al-Arabi)
13	DF	NOR	Kevin Egell-Johnsen (loan return from Kongsvinger)
16	MF	NOR	Vebjørn Hoff (on loan from Rosenborg)
20	MF	NOR	Thomas Rekdal (from (Germany) VfB Stuttgart II)
25	FW	AUT	Philipp Zulechner (from (Germany) Halle)
30	GK	NOR	Peder Nygaard Klausen (promoted from junior squad)

Out: Note: Flags indicate national team as defined under FIFA eligibility rules; some limited exceptions apply. Players may hold more than one non-FIFA nationality.

No.	Pos.	Nation	Player
1	GK	NOR	Sondre Rossbach (on loan to Vålerenga)
10	FW	NGR	Onyekachi Hope Ugwuadu (to Pors)
16	MF	NOR	Joshua Kitolano (to (Netherlands) Sparta Rotterdam)
20	FW	NOR	Tobias Lauritsen (to (Netherlands) Sparta Rotterdam)
25	DF	NOR	John Kitolano (to Aalesund)

== Competitions ==
=== Eliteserien ===
==== Results summary ====
Overall								Home						Away					
Pld	W	D	L	GF	GA	GD	Pts	W	D	L	GF	GA	GD	W	D	L	GF	GA	GD
30	13	6	11	43	45	−2	45	8	1	6	26	22	+4	5	5	5	17	23	−6

Last updated: 13 November 2022.

==== Results by round ====
Round	1	2	3	4	5	6	7	8	9	10	11	12	13	14	15	16	17	18	19	20	21	22	23	24	25	26	27	28	29	30
Ground	H	A	H	H	A	H	A	H	A	H	A	H	A	H	A	H	A	A	H	A	H	A	H	A	H	A	H	A	H	A
Result	W	L	W	L	L	L	W	L	W	L	W	W	D	L	D	L	L	L	W	D	W	W	W	D	D	L	W	W	W	D
Position	2	7	4	8	11	15	10	12	10	11	11	9	9	10	9	9	11	12	9	9	9	8	7	6	6	8	7	6	6	5

A = Away; H = Home; W = Win; D = Draw; L = Loss

==== Results ====
3 April 2022 1	Odd	2–0	Tromsø	Skien
18:00 CEST (UTC+2)	Ruud 6'; Jevtović 54'; Aas (yellow card) 77'; Bjørtuft (yellow card) 83'	Report	Psyché (yellow card) 22'	Stadium: Skagerak Arena; Attendance: 4,320; Referee: Rohit Saggi

10 April 2022 2	Rosenborg	1–0	Odd	Trondheim
18:00 CEST (UTC+2)	Holm 34'; Holse (yellow card) 73'; Børkeeiet (yellow card) 74'	Report	Ruud (yellow card) 56'	Stadium: Lerkendal Stadion; Attendance: 12,048; Referee: Ola Hobber Nilsen

18 April 2022 3	Odd	2–1	Viking	Skien
18:00 CEST (UTC+2)	Ingebrigtsen 51'; Aas (yellow card) 90+2'; Jevtović 90+4' (yellow card) 90+5'	Report	Sandberg (yellow card) 44'; Kabran 87'	Stadium: Skagerak Arena; Attendance: 4,908; Referee: Sivert Øksnes Amland

23 April 2022 4	Odd	2–3	Aalesund	Skien
16:00 CEST (UTC+2)	Mesík (yellow card) 44'; Lauritsen 50', 65'; Lekven (yellow card) 52'	Report	Haugen 14'; Määttä 34'; Ødemarksbakken 55'; Čanađija (yellow card) 83'	Stadium: Skagerak Arena; Attendance: 4,893; Referee: Daniel Higraff

7 May 2022 5	Sarpsborg 08	1–0	Odd	Sarpsborg
16:00 CEST (UTC+2)	Molins (penalty missed) 45+4' (yellow card) 45+4'; Opseth 63'	Report	Ruud (yellow card) 45+1'; Hagen (yellow card) 63' (yellow-red card) 90'	Stadium: Sarpsborg Stadion; Attendance: 4,765; Referee: Mohammad Usman Aslam

11 May 2022 18	Molde	3–0	Odd	Molde
19:00 CEST (UTC+2)	Eikrem 14'; Mannsverk 33' (pen.); Grødem 62'	Report	Bjørtuft (yellow card) 27' (red card) 32'; Josh. Kitolano (yellow card) 83'	Stadium: Aker Stadion; Attendance: 5,045; Referee: Svein Oddvar Moen

16 May 2022 6	Odd	0–4	Haugesund	Skien
18:00 CEST (UTC+2)		Report	Reese 9'; Sande 17'; Ndour 51'; Søderlund 54'	Stadium: Skagerak Arena; Attendance: 7,164; Referee: Espen Eskås

22 May 2022 7	Jerv	0–1	Odd	Grimstad
18:00 CEST (UTC+2)	Brenden (yellow card) 21'; Furtado (yellow card) 72'	Report	Wallem (yellow card) 27'; Jevtović 70'	Stadium: J.J. Ugland Stadion – Levermyr; Attendance: 2,412; Referee: Sivert Øksnes Amland

25 May 2022 8	Odd	0–1	Sandefjord	Skien
18:00 CEST (UTC+2)	Wallem (yellow card) 44'	Report	Ayer 15'; Taaje (yellow card) 54'; Singh (yellow card) 54'; Ofkir (yellow card) 68'; Gussiås (yellow card) 90'	Stadium: Skagerak Arena; Attendance: 3,907; Referee: Kristoffer Hagenes

28 May 2022 9	HamKam	1–2	Odd	Hamar
16:00 CEST (UTC+2)	Sjølstad (yellow card) 23' (yellow-red card) 43'; Kongsro 46'	Report	Jevtović 24' (pen.) (yellow card) 61'; Lauritsen 28'; Wallem (yellow card) 58'; Owusu (yellow card) 88'	Stadium: Briskeby Stadion; Attendance: 3,340; Referee: Rohit Saggi

19 June 2022 10	Odd	1–2	Molde	Skien
18:00 CEST (UTC+2)	Lauritsen 72'; Ingebrigtsen (yellow card) 90+3'	Report	Owusu 13' (o.g.); Risa (yellow card) 18'; Fofana 48' (yellow card) 66'; Kaasa (yellow card) 90+3'	Stadium: Skagerak Arena; Attendance: 5,095; Referee: Mohammad Usman Aslam

26 June 2022 11	Vålerenga	0–1	Odd	Oslo
20:00 CEST (UTC+2)	Sahraoui (yellow card) 90+3'	Report	Lauritsen 60'	Stadium: Intility Arena; Attendance: 6,685; Referee: Christian Moen

2 July 2022 12	Odd	3–2	Bodø/Glimt	Skien
18:00 CEST (UTC+2)	Jevtović 19' (yellow card) 78'; Jørgensen (yellow card) 52'; Wallem 59'; Stensrud (yellow card) 75'; Bjørtuft (red card) 84'; Ruud 90+9' (pen.)	Report	Pellegrino 29'; Høibråten (yellow card) 54'; Sery Larsen (yellow card) 72'; Amundsen 90+7'	Stadium: Skagerak Arena; Attendance: 3,748; Referee: Rohit Saggi

9 July 2022 13	Strømsgodset	0–0	Odd	Drammen
18:00 CEST (UTC+2)	Vilsvik (yellow card) 70'	Report	Ruud (yellow card) 22'	Stadium: Marienlyst stadion Attendance: 4,461; Referee: Daniel Higraff

17 July 2022 14	Odd	1–2	Lillestrøm	Skien
18:00 CEST (UTC+2)	Mesík (yellow card) 5'; Lauritsen 68'	Report	Knudsen 61'; Pettersson 90+2'	Stadium: Skagerak Arena; Attendance: 4,507; Referee: Espen Eskås

24 July 2022 15	Kristiansund	2–2	Odd	Kristiansund
18:00 CEST (UTC+2)	Hopmark 8'; Bye 20'; Diop (yellow card) 86'	Report	Jørgensen 46'; Ruud 56'; Joh. Kitolano (yellow card) 60'; Josh. Kitolano (yellow card) 90'	Stadium: Kristiansund Stadion; Attendance: 3,544; Referee: Tore Hansen

30 July 2022 16	Odd	2–3	Rosenborg	Skien
18:00 CEST (UTC+2)	Jørgensen 10' (yellow card) 45'; Stensrud 81'; Josh. Kitolano (yellow card) 90'	Report	Holse 56'; Dahl Reitan 66'; Skarsem (yellow card) 68'; Sæter 77'; Giampaoli (yellow card) 90+1'	Stadium: Skagerak Arena; Attendance: 4,292; Referee: Marius Hansen Grøtta

6 August 2022 17	Bodø/Glimt	7–0	Odd	Bodø
16:00 CEST (UTC+2)	Pellegrino 12', 44'; Vetlesen 26', 45+1', 53'; Espejord 67'; Saltnes 78'	Report		Stadium: Aspmyra Stadion; Attendance: 5,211; Referee: Ola Hobber Nilsen

20 August 2022 19	Odd	1–0	Sarpsborg 08	Skien
18:00 CEST (UTC+2)	Jevtović 25'; Aas (yellow card) 78'; Wahlstedt (yellow card) 83'; Hoff (yellow card) 84'	Report		Stadium: Skagerak Arena; Attendance: 3,380; Referee: Daniel Higraff

28 August 2022 20	Aalesund	1–1	Odd	Ålesund
18:00 CEST (UTC+2)	Fällman (yellow card) 29'; Ebiye 32'; Barmen (yellow card) 78'	Report	Hagen (yellow card) 3'; Jevtović 36'; Bjørtuft (yellow card) 76'; Ruud (yellow card) 86'	Stadium: Color Line Stadion; Attendance: 4,777; Referee: Mohammad Usman Aslam

4 September 2022 21	Odd	2–1	Jerv	Skien
18:00 CEST (UTC+2)	Diomande 7'; Bjørtuft 42'; Wallem (yellow card) 90+4'	Report	Wilson 11'; Bredeli (yellow card) 18'; Sandberg (red card) 38'; Fernandes (yellow card) 48'	Stadium: Skagerak Arena; Attendance: 3,961; Referee: Marius Hansen Grøtta

11 September 2022 22	Sandefjord	1–3	Odd	Sandefjord
18:00 CEST (UTC+2)	Flo 27'; Haakenstad (yellow card) 69'; Ayer (yellow card) 74'	Report	Owusu 38'; Gjengaar (yellow card) 44' (goal) 48', 52'; Ruud (yellow card) 65'	Stadium: Release Arena; Attendance: 2,744; Referee: Rohit Saggi

17 September 2022 23	Odd	2–0	HamKam	Skien
18:00 CEST (UTC+2)	Jevtović 49' (pen.), 89' (pen.)	Report	Kurucay (yellow card) 45'; Kongsro (yellow card) 85'	Stadium: Skagerak Arena; Attendance: 3,818; Referee: Kristoffer Hagenes

2 October 2022 24	Haugesund	2–2	Odd	Haugesund
17:00 CEST (UTC+2)	Fredriksen (yellow card) 44'; Sande 45+1'; Njie 46'; Pedersen (yellow card) 51'; Bærtelsen (yellow card) 87'	Report	Gjengaar 24'; Owusu (yellow card) 53'; Wallem 82'; Jørgensen (yellow card) 86'	Stadium: Haugesund Stadion; Attendance: 4,019; Referee: Kai Erik Steen

9 October 2022 25	Odd	1–1	Kristiansund	Skien
17:00 CEST (UTC+2)	Jevtović 28' (pen.); Wallem (yellow card) 70'	Report	Bye 17'; Gjesdal (yellow card) 59'	Stadium: Skagerak Arena; Attendance: 3,720; Referee: Svein Tore Sinnes

15 October 2022 26	Tromsø	3–2	Odd	Tromsø
16:00 CEST (UTC+2)	Winther 41'; A. Jenssen (yellow card) 80'; Antonsen 89'; E. Kitolano 90+5' (pen.)	Report	Ingebrigtsen 8', 55'; Gjengaar (yellow card) 38'	Stadium: Alfheim Stadion; Attendance: 3,124; Referee: Marius Hansen Grøtta

22 October 2022 27	Odd	2–1	Vålerenga	Skien
18:00 CEST (UTC+2)	Gjengaar 28'; Wallem 70'; Ruud (yellow card) 82'; Jørgensen (yellow card) 88'; Jevtović (yellow card) 90+2'	Report	Sahraoui (yellow card) 49'; Jatta (yellow card) 78'; Dicko Eng 87'	Stadium: Skagerak Arena; Attendance: 5,279; Referee: Sivert Øksnes Amland

30 October 2022 28	Lillestrøm	0–2	Odd	Lillestrøm
17:00 CET (UTC+1)	Garnås (yellow card) 54'; Helland (yellow card) 90'	Report	Wahlstedt (yellow card) 65'; Ingebrigtsen 82' (yellow card) 82'; Gjengaar 87'	Stadium: Åråsen Stadion; Attendance: 5,957; Referee: Ola Hobber Nilsen

6 November 2022 29	Odd	5–1	Strømsgodset	Skien
17:00 CET (UTC+1)	Hoff 1', 47' (yellow card) 56'; Ruud (penalty missed) 18' (yellow card) 31'; Jørgensen 20'; Wallem 83'; Stensrud 88' (yellow card) 89'	Report	Brunes 26'	Stadium: Skagerak Arena; Attendance: 5,043; Referee: Tore Hansen

13 November 2022 30	Viking	1–1	Odd	Stavanger
17:00 CET (UTC+1)	de Lanlay 43'; Stensness (yellow card) 50' (yellow-red card) 57'; Tripić (yellow card) 70'	Report	Hoff 59'; Bjørtuft (yellow card) 90+1'	Stadium: Viking Stadion; Attendance: 8,065; Referee: Tommy Skjerven

==== Table ====
Pos	Team	Pld	W	D	L	GF	GA	GD	Pts	Qualification or relegation
3	Rosenborg	30	16	8	6	69	44	+25	56	Qualification for the Europa Conference League second qualifying round
4	Lillestrøm	30	16	5	9	49	34	+15	53	
5	Odd	30	13	6	11	43	45	−2	45	
6	Vålerenga	30	13	5	12	52	49	+3	44	
7	Tromsø	30	10	13	7	46	49	−3	43	

Source: Football Association of Norway (in Norwegian)
Rules for classification: 1) Points; 2) Goal difference; 3) Goals scored; 4) Head-to-head points; 5) Head-to-head goal difference; 6) Head-to-head goals scored.

=== Norwegian Football Cup ===
==== 2021 ====
13 March 2022 Fourth round	Molde	3–2 (a.e.t.)	Odd	Molde
20:10 CET (UTC+1)	Karlstrøm (yellow card) 8'; Fofana (yellow card) 37' (goal) 116'; Andersen 82'; Linnes (yellow card) 90+3'; Hussain (yellow card) 96'; Haugen 119' (yellow card) 120+2'; Eikrem (yellow card) 120'	Report	Lauritsen (penalty missed) 8'; Jørgensen 12'; Jevtović (yellow card) 43'; Rólantsson 105' (yellow card) 120+2'	Stadium: Aker Stadion; Referee: Tom Harald Hagen

==== 2022 ====
19 May 2022 First round	Hei	1–6	Odd	Porsgrunn
18:00 CEST (UTC+2)	Tusvik (yellow card) 7'; Garstad 38'; Lauritzen (yellow card) 62'	Report	Bjørtuft 8', 68'; Jørgensen 9', 75'; Kastrati 39'; Stensrud 69' (yellow card) 71'	Stadium: Mortens Plass Kunstgress; Referee: Herman Leiulfsrud Aass

22 June 2022 Second round	Flekkerøy	2–3 (a.e.t.)	Odd	Flekkerøy
18:00 CEST (UTC+2)	Knezovic (yellow card) 9'; Hella 66'; Hauge (yellow card) 78'; Hove 84'; Hille (yellow card) 86'	Report	Ruud 10' (pen.); Jørgensen (yellow card) 14'; Owusu 52'; Mesík (yellow card) 93'; Hagen 115'	Stadium: Cemo Arena; Attendance: 612; Referee: Jørgen Haga

10 August 2022 Third round	Jerv	2–3 (a.e.t.)	Odd	Grimstad
18:00 CEST	Ugland 17'; Mafi (yellow card) 33'; Diallo 62'	Report	Ingebrigtsen 2', 45+1'; Owusu (yellow card) 84'; Aas (yellow card) 106'; Jevtović 110' (yellow card) 110'; Kastrati (yellow card) 116'	Stadium: Levermyr Stadion; Attendance: 1,522; Referee: Tore Hansen

Fourth round took place during the 2023 season.
