= 2021 Odds BK season =

Odd
2021 season
- Chairman: Trond Haukvik
- Manager: Jan Frode Nornes
- Stadium: Skagerak Arena
- Eliteserien: 13th
- Norwegian Cup: Fourth round
- Top goalscorer: League: Mushaga Bakenga (11); All: Mushaga Bakenga (11)
Home colours	Away colours

The 2021 season was Odds BK's 127th season in existence and the club's 14th consecutive season in the top flight of Norwegian football. In addition to the domestic league, Odds BK participated in this season's edition of the Norwegian Football Cup.

== Players ==
=== First team squad ===
As of 12 June 2021

Note: Flags indicate national team as defined under FIFA eligibility rules; some limited exceptions apply. Players may hold more than one non-FIFA nationality.

No.	Pos.	Nation	Player
1	GK	(Norway) NOR	Sondre Rossbach
2	DF	(Norway) NOR	Espen Ruud
3	DF	(Norway) NOR	Emil Jonassen
4	DF	(Norway) NOR	Odin Bjørtuft
6	MF	(Norway) NOR	Magnus Lekven
7	MF	(Norway) NOR	Filip Rønningen Jørgensen
8	MF	(Norway) NOR	Markus André Kaasa
9	FW	(Kosovo) KOS	Flamur Kastrati
10	FW	(Nigeria) NGA	Kachi
11	FW	(Faroe Islands) FRO	Gilli Rólantsson
12	GK	(Sweden) SWE	Leopold Wahlstedt
13	DF	(Norway) NOR	Kevin Egell-Johnsen
14	MF	(Norway) NOR	Conrad Wallem

No.	Pos.	Nation	Player
15	MF	(Norway) NOR	Eirik Asante Gayi
16	MF	(Norway) NOR	Joshua Kitolano
17	MF	(Norway) NOR	Elias Uppheim Skogvoll
18	FW	(Norway) NOR	Syver Aas
19	DF	(Norway) NOR	Thomas Hallstensen
20	FW	(Norway) NOR	Tobias Lauritsen
21	DF	(Norway) NOR	Steffen Hagen (captain)
22	MF	(Norway) NOR	Kristoffer Larsen
23	MF	(Norway) NOR	Solomon Owusu
24	MF	(Norway) NOR	Bjørn Mæland
25	DF	(Norway) NOR	John Kitolano
26	MF	(Serbia) SRB	Milan Jevtović
29	FW	(Norway) NOR	Sander Svendsen (on loan from OB)

== Transfers ==
=== Winter ===
In: Note: Flags indicate national team as defined under FIFA eligibility rules; some limited exceptions apply. Players may hold more than one non-FIFA nationality.

No.	Pos.	Nation	Player
6	MF	(Norway) NOR	Magnus Lekven (from Vålerenga)
10	MF	(Norway) NOR	Sander Svendsen (on loan from (Denmark) OB)
11	MF	(Faroe Islands) FRO	Gilli Rólantsson (from Brann)
12	GK	(Sweden) SWE	Leopold Wahlstedt (from Arendal)
14	DF	(Norway) NOR	Conrad Wallem (from Arendal)
18	FW	(Norway) NOR	Syver Aas (promoted from junior squad)
22	MF	(Norway) NOR	Kristoffer Larsen (from Åsane)
23	DF	(Norway) NOR	Solomon Owusu (from Raufoss)
25	DF	(Norway) NOR	John Kitolano (from (England) Wolverhampton Wanderers, previously on loan)

Out: Note: Flags indicate national team as defined under FIFA eligibility rules; some limited exceptions apply. Players may hold more than one non-FIFA nationality.

No.	Pos.	Nation	Player
3	DF	(Norway) NOR	Fredrik Semb Berge (retired)
4	DF	(Denmark) DEN	Rasmus Minor Petersen (retired)
6	MF	(Norway) NOR	Vebjørn Hoff (to Rosenborg)
7	MF	(Montenegro) MNE	Vladimir Rodić (loan return to (Sweden) Hammarby)
11	MF	(Kosovo) KOS	Elbasan Rashani (to (Turkey) BB Erzurumspor)
12	GK	(Norway) NOR	Egil Selvik (to Haugesund)
14	MF	(Norway) NOR	Fredrik Nordkvelle (retired)
17	MF	(Norway) NOR	Elias Uppheim Skogvoll (on loan to Grorud)
22	FW	(Sweden) SWE	Robin Simović (to (Sweden) Varberg)
23	MF	(Norway) NOR	Marius Bustgaard Larsen (to (Germany) Holstein Kiel)

=== Summer ===
In: Note: Flags indicate national team as defined under FIFA eligibility rules; some limited exceptions apply. Players may hold more than one non-FIFA nationality.

No.	Pos.	Nation	Player
3	DF	(Norway) NOR	Emil Jonassen (from Stabæk)
9	FW	(Norway) NOR	Flamur Kastrati (from Kristiansund)
17	MF	(Norway) NOR	Elias Uppheim Skogvoll (loan return from Grorud)
26	FW	(Serbia) SRB	Milan Jevtović (from (Denmark) AGF)

Out: Note: Flags indicate national team as defined under FIFA eligibility rules; some limited exceptions apply. Players may hold more than one non-FIFA nationality.

No.	Pos.	Nation	Player
9	FW	(Norway) NOR	Mushaga Bakenga (to (Japan) Tokushima Vortis)
19	DF	(Norway) NOR	Thomas Hallstensen (on loan to Ull/Kisa)

== Competitions ==
=== Eliteserien ===
==== Results summary ====
Overall								Home						Away					
Pld	W	D	L	GF	GA	GD	Pts	W	D	L	GF	GA	GD	W	D	L	GF	GA	GD
30	8	9	13	44	58	−14	33	5	4	6	30	29	+1	3	5	7	14	29	−15

Last updated: 12 December 2021.

==== Results by round ====
Round	1	2	3	4	5	6	7	8	9	10	11	12	13	14	15	16	17	18	19	20	21	22	23	24	25	26	27	28	29	30
Ground	A	H	A	H	A	H	A	A	H	A	H	A	H	A	H	A	H	A	H	A	H	A	H	A	H	H	A	H	A	H
Result	L	L	D	D	L	W	L	W	W	W	D	L	W	D	W	L	L	D	L	W	L	D	D	L	D	L	D	L	L	W
Position	15	14	15	15	15	14	15	14	10	9	10	11	11	11	9	10	10	11	11	10	10	10	10	13	12	12	12	13	13	13

A = Away; H = Home; W = Win; D = Draw; L = Loss

==== Results ====
19 May 2021 3	Stabæk	2–2	Odd	Bærum
20:00 CEST (UTC+2)	Hansen 9'; Jenssen (yellow card) 12'; Shala (yellow card) 27'; Skytte 47' (yellow card) 56'; Jönsson (yellow card) 90'	Report	Bakenga 19' (pen.), 44'; Owusu (yellow card) 46'; Joh. Kitolano (yellow card) 59'; Wallem (yellow card) 90'	Stadium: Nadderud Stadion; Attendance: 0 Referee: Mohammad Usman Aslam

24 May 2021 4	Odd	1–1	Sarpsborg 08	Skien
15:00 CEST (UTC+2)	Bakenga (yellow card) 42'; Jørgensen 90+2'	Report	Ødegaard (yellow card) 15'; Lindseth 27'; Halvorsen (yellow card) 42'	Stadium: Skagerak Arena; Attendance: 0 Referee: Dag Vidar Hafsås

27 May 2021 5	Lillestrøm	1–0	Odd	Lillestrøm
18:00 CEST (UTC+2)	Lehne Olsen 36'; Garnås (yellow card) 61'	Report	Rólantsson (yellow card) 45'; Bakenga (yellow card) 81'	Stadium: Åråsen Stadion; Attendance: 20; Referee: Kristoffer Hagenes

30 May 2021 6	Odd	1–0	Bodø/Glimt	Skien
18:00 CEST (UTC+2)	Svendsen 4'	Report	Saltnes (yellow card) 41'; Vetlesen (yellow card) 65'; Lindahl (yellow card) 69'	Stadium: Skagerak Arena; Attendance: 0 Referee: Espen Eskås

12 June 2021 7	Kristiansund	2–0	Odd	Kristiansund
15:00 CEST (UTC+2)	Kartum 63'; Ulvestad (yellow card) 81'; Muçolli 90+1'; Willumsson (yellow card) 90+2'	Report		Stadium: Kristiansund Stadion; Attendance: 600; Referee: Mohammad Usman Aslam

16 June 2021 14	Vålerenga	1–1	Odd	Oslo
20:00 CEST (UTC+2)	Udahl 11'	Report	Joh. Kitolano (yellow card) 23'; Bakenga 43' (pen.); Kaasa (yellow card) 90+2'	Stadium: Intility Arena; Attendance: 600; Referee: Svein Oddvar Moen

20 June 2021 8	Brann	1–3	Odd	Bergen
18:00 CEST (UTC+2)	Tveita 81'; Kolskogen (yellow card) 88'	Report	Bakenga 49' (pen.), 72', 88'; Josh. Kitolano (yellow card) 86'	Stadium: Brann Stadion; Attendance: 600; Referee: Tom Harald Hagen

24 June 2021 9	Odd	3–0	Tromsø	Skien
18:00 CEST (UTC+2)	Bakenga 32', 77' (yellow card) 84'; J. Kitolano 54'; Svendsen (yellow card) 86'	Report	Arnarson (yellow card) 5'; Berntsen (yellow card) 45+1'; Jenssen (yellow card) 85'	Stadium: Skagerak Arena; Attendance: 1,749; Referee: Sivert Øksnes Amland

1 July 2021 10	Mjøndalen	1–2	Odd	Mjøndalen
18:00 CEST (UTC+2)	Sell (yellow card) 25'; Ibrahim 67'	Report	Rólantsson (yellow card) 37'; Johansen 41' (o.g.); Bakenga 50' (pen.); Rossbach (yellow card) 89'	Stadium: Consto Arena; Attendance: 1,350; Referee: Ola Hobber Nilsen

4 July 2021 11	Odd	2–2	Rosenborg	Skien
18:00 CEST (UTC+2)	Rólantsson 37'; Bakenga (yellow card) 57'; Lauritsen 89'	Report	Islamović 17'; Zachariassen 45+2'	Stadium: Skagerak Arena; Attendance: 2,000; Referee: Tore Hansen

11 July 2021 12	Molde	5–0	Odd	Molde
18:00 CEST (UTC+2)	Haugen 10'; Sinyan 18'; Omoijuanfo 30', 62'; Grødem 57'	Report		Stadium: Aker Stadion; Attendance: 2,000; Referee: Espen Eskås

17 July 2021 13	Odd	3–2	Viking	Skien
18:00 CEST (UTC+2)	Rólantsson (yellow card) 14'; Ruud (yellow card) 45'; Kaasa 45+2'; Bakenga 46', 68' (pen.)	Report	Tangen 60'; Berisha 73'	Stadium: Skagerak Arena; Attendance: 1,607; Referee: Rohit Saggi

21 July 2021 1	Strømsgodset	3–0	Odd	Drammen
19:00 CEST (UTC+2)	Gulliksen (yellow card) 9' (goal) 58'; Valsvik (yellow card) 17'; Jack 49' (yellow card) 66'; Stengel 61'	Report		Stadium: Marienlyst Stadion; Attendance: 2,000; Referee: Christian Moen

28 July 2021 2	Odd	2–3	Sandefjord	Skien
19:00 CEST (UTC+2)	Storevik 36' (o.g.); Bjørtuft (yellow card) 49'; Larsen 88'	Report	Risan 2'; Ruud Tveter 44'; Jónsson 50'; Foss (yellow card) 64'	Stadium: Skagerak Arena; Attendance: 1,850; Referee: Tom Harald Hagen

15 August 2021 15	Odd	4–2	Haugesund	Skien
18:00 CEST (UTC+2)	Lauritsen 18', 45+2', 70'; Svendsen 62'	Report	Wadji 25'; Velde 53'	Stadium: Skagerak Arena; Attendance: 2,000; Referee: Mohammad Usman Aslam

22 August 2021 16	Rosenborg	5–0	Odd	Trondheim
20:00 CEST (UTC+2)	Eyjólfsson 2'; Holm 10'; Vecchia 15', 84'; Ceïde 59'; Augustinsson (yellow card) 81'; Tagseth (yellow card) 82'	Report		Stadium: Lerkendal Stadion; Attendance: 6,235; Referee: Espen Eskås

29 August 2021 17	Odd	0–1	Strømsgodset	Skien
18:00 CEST (UTC+2)	Joh. Kitolano (yellow card) 42'	Report	Stengel 9' (yellow card) 73'; Stenevik (yellow card) 66'; Leifsson (yellow card) 73'; Friday (yellow card) 90'	Stadium: Skagerak Arena; Attendance: 3,208; Referee: Marius Hansen Grøtta

12 September 2021 18	Bodø/Glimt	1–1	Odd	Bodø
18:00 CEST (UTC+2)	Saltnes 32'	Report	Svendsen 39'; Wallem (yellow card) 85'	Stadium: Aspmyra Stadion; Attendance: 2,700; Referee: Rohit Saggi

18 September 2021 19	Odd	2–3	Lillestrøm	Skien
18:00 CEST (UTC+2)	Svendsen 2', 31'	Report	Lehne Olsen 22', 53'; Pettersson 25'; Slørdahl (yellow card) 57'	Stadium: Skagerak Arena; Attendance: 3,295; Referee: Tommy Skjerven

26 September 2021 20	Haugesund	1–3	Odd	Haugesund
18:00 CEST (UTC+2)	Samuelsen 33'	Report	Josh. Kitolano 7'; Ruud 56'; Svendsen 71'	Stadium: Haugesund Stadion; Attendance: 2,797; Referee: Christian Moen

3 October 2021 21	Odd	1–3	Molde	Skien
18:00 CEST (UTC+2)	Wallem 28'; Bjørtuft (yellow card) 88'	Report	Andersen 19', 64'; Omoijuanfo 42'	Stadium: Skagerak Arena; Attendance: 6,655; Referee: Sigurd Smehus Kringstad

17 October 2021 22	Sandefjord	0–0	Odd	Sandefjord
17:00 CEST (UTC+2)	Smeulers (yellow card) 14'; Brenden (yellow card) 36'; Kreuzriegler (yellow card) 76'	Report	Jørgensen (yellow card) 42'; Joh. Kitolano (yellow card) 87'	Stadium: Release Arena; Attendance: 4,673; Referee: Tom Harald Hagen

24 October 2021 23	Odd	3–3	Brann	Skien
18:00 CEST (UTC+2)	Svendsen 12', 45'; Owusu 52'	Report	Taylor 7'; Pallesen Knudsen 17' (yellow card) 90+1'; Heggebø 63'	Stadium: Skagerak Arena; Attendance: 3,728; Referee: Svein Oddvar Moen

27 October 2021 24	Tromsø	2–0	Odd	Tromsø
18:00 CEST (UTC+2)	Mikkelsen 52'; Ebiye 83'	Report	Josh. Kitolano (yellow card) 85'	Stadium: Alfheim Stadion; Attendance: 1,990; Referee: Christian Moen

31 October 2021 25	Odd	2–2	Mjøndalen	Skien
18:00 CET (UTC+1)	Kaasa 7'; Lauritsen 11'; Josh. Kitolano (yellow card) 68'	Report	Aasmundsen (yellow card) 75'; Larsen 80', 82'; Sveen (yellow card) 90+3'	Stadium: Skagerak Arena; Attendance: 3,312; Referee: Kristoffer Hagenes

7 November 2021 26	Odd	2–4	Kristiansund	Skien
17:00 CET (UTC+1)	Wallem 1'; Lauritsen (yellow card) 22' (goal) 64'; Josh. Kitolano (yellow card) 86'	Report	Gjertsen 4'; Mawa 48', 54', 77'; Sivertsen (yellow card) 70'	Stadium: Skagerak Arena; Attendance: 3,300; Referee: Rohit Saggi

21 November 2021 27	Sarpsborg 08	1–1	Odd	Sarpsborg
17:00 CET (UTC+1)	Salétros 70'	Report	Aas 84'	Stadium: Sarpsborg Stadion; Attendance: 4,037; Referee: Marius Hansen Grøtta

27 November 2021 28	Odd	1–2	Vålerenga	Skien
18:00 CET (UTC+1)	Lauritsen 34'; Josh. Kitolano (yellow card) 58'; Aas (yellow card) 83'	Report	Holm 4' (yellow card) 9'; Bjørdal 75' (pen.); Sahraoui (yellow card) 90+7'	Stadium: Skagerak Arena; Attendance: 3,685; Referee: Tom Harald Hagen

5 December 2021 29	Viking	3–1	Odd	Stavanger
17:00 CET (UTC+1)	Sebulonsen 45'; Berisha 58' (pen.); Friðjónsson 75'	Report	Jørgensen 2' (yellow card) 7'; Kaasa (yellow card) 11'; Josh. Kitolano (yellow card) 45'	Stadium: Viking Stadion; Attendance: 14,103; Referee: Sivert Øksnes Amland

12 December 2021 30	Odd	3–1	Stabæk	Skien
17:00 CET (UTC+1)	Wallem 18' (yellow card) 44'; Ruud 76'; Lauritsen 84'	Report	Azemi (penalty missed) 33'; Ottesen (yellow card) 58'; Haugen 67'	Stadium: Skagerak Arena; Attendance: 2,691; Referee: Rohit Saggi

==== Table ====
Pos	Team	Pld	W	D	L	GF	GA	GD	Pts	Qualification or relegation
11	Haugesund	30	9	8	13	46	45	+1	35	
12	Tromsø	30	8	11	11	33	44	−11	35	
13	Odd	30	8	9	13	44	58	−14	33	
14	Brann (R)	30	5	11	14	38	55	−17	26	Qualification for the relegation play-offs
15	Stabæk (R)	30	6	7	17	35	62	−27	25	Relegation to First Division

Source: Football Association of Norway (in Norwegian)
Rules for classification: 1) Points; 2) Goal difference; 3) Goals scored; 4) Head-to-head points; 5) Head-to-head goal difference; 6) Head-to-head away goals scored (only if between two teams); 7) Head-to-head goals scored; 8) Play-off (only used to decide champions or relegation).
(R) Relegated

=== Norwegian Football Cup ===
24 July 2021 First round	Eik Tønsberg	0–1	Odd	Tønsberg
16:00 CEST (UTC+2)		Report	Lauritsen 89' (pen.); Joh. Kitolano (yellow card) 90+1'	Stadium: Tønsberg Gressbane; Attendance: 1,347; Referee: Sander Johannessen

1 August 2021 Second round	Fram Larvik	0–1	Odd	Larvik
18:00 CEST (UTC+2)	Einarson (yellow card) 44'; Nilsen (yellow card) 72'	Report	Rólantsson 36'; Jørgensen (yellow card) 69'; Joh. Kitolano (yellow card) 76'; Wallem (yellow card) 82'	Stadium: Framparken; Attendance: 800; Referee: Magnus Nicolay Koløy

22 September 2021 Third round	Vålerenga	0–3	Odd	Oslo
18:00 CEST (UTC+2)	Bjørdal (yellow card) 68'; Oldrup Jensen (yellow card) 72'; Sahraoui (yellow card) 83' (yellow-red card) 84'	Report	Jevtović 20'; Svendsen 58', 60'	Stadium: Intility Arena; Attendance: 2,913; Referee: Kai Erik Steen

Fourth round took place during the 2022 season.
