= 2026 Odds BK season =

Odd
2026 season
- Chairman: Bernt Ove Søvik
- Head coach: Per Frandsen
- Stadium: Skagerak Arena
- 1. divisjon: 4th
- 2026–27 Norwegian Cup: First round
- Top goalscorer: League: Faniel Tewelde (9); All: Faniel Tewelde (9)
- Biggest win: Odd 4–0 Sogndal
- Biggest defeat: Kongsvinger 4–2 Odd
Home colours	Away colours
- All statistics correct as of 25 May 2026.

The 2026 season is the 133rd season in the history of Odds BK and the club’s second consecutive season in the Norwegian First Division. Odds BK will also participate in the Norwegian Football Cup.

== Transfers ==
=== In ===
Pos.	Player	Transferred from	Fee	Date	Source
DF	(Denmark) Jakob Vadstrup	(Denmark) Kolding IF	Undisclosed	16 December 2025	
FW	(Norway) Casper Glenna Andersen	(Norway) Pors Fotball	Loan return	31 December 2025	
MF	(Sweden) Daniel Söderberg	(Sweden) Sandvikens IF	Undisclosed	9 January 2026	
DF	(Denmark) Jacob Buus	(Denmark) Esbjerg fB	Undisclosed	8 February 2026	
FW	(Norway) Sanel Bojadzic	(Norway) Bryne	Undisclosed	11 March 2026	
MF	(Denmark) Villads Rasmussen	(Denmark) Hobro IK	Undisclosed	20 March 2026	
FW	(Norway) Faniel Tewelde	(Belgium) Lommel	Loan	31 March 2026	

=== Out ===
Pos.	Player	Transferred to	Fee	Date	Source
FW	(Cameroon) Ivan Djantou	(Denmark) Sønderjyske	Loan return	31 December 2025	
DF	(Norway) Steffen Hagen	Retired		1 January 2026	
GK	(Norway) André Hansen	Retired		1 January 2026	
MF	(Pakistan) Etzaz Hussain	Retired		1 January 2026	
DF	(Norway) Sondre Solholm Johansen	Retired		1 January 2026	
DF	(Norway) Jørgen Vedal Sjøl	(Norway) Raufoss	Undisclosed	30 January 2026	
MF	(Norway) Rafik Zekhnini	(Norway) Raufoss	Free	8 March 2026	
MF	(Liberia) Justin Salmon	(Sweden) Nacka FC	Contract terminated	24 March 2026	

== Pre-season and friendlies ==
On 16 December 2025, the preparation plan for the team’s 2026 season was announced, including a nine-day training camp in Marbella, Spain.

23 January 2026	Odd (Norway)	1–1	(Norway) Arendal	Folkestad
				Stadium: Telemarkshallen

30 January 2026	Odd (Norway)	3–0	(Norway) Jerv	Folkestad
				Stadium: Telemarkshallen

7 February 2026	Incheon United (South Korea)	v	(Norway) Odd	Marbella, Spain
Note: The match was cancelled due to heavy rainfall.

10 February 2026	Malmö FF (Sweden)	0–2	(Norway) Odd	Marbella, Spain
16:00

18 February 2026	Odd (Norway)	2–0	(Norway) Strømsgodset

28 February 2026	Fredrikstad (Norway)	4–1	(Norway) Odd	Fredrikstad

8 March 2026	Odd (Norway)	1–0	(Finland) Inter Turku	Skien
	Söderberg	Report		Stadium: Skagerak Arena

13 March 2026	Odd (Norway)	2–0	(Norway) Moss	Skien
				Stadium: Skagerak Arena

21 March 2026	Odd (Norway)	2–1	(Norway) Strømmen	Skien
				Stadium: Skagerak Arena

30 March 2026	Odd (Norway)	2–1	(Norway) Lyn	Skien
				Stadium: Skagerak Arena

== Competitions ==
=== Overall record ===
Competition	First match	Last match	Starting round	Record							
Competition	First match	Last match	Starting round	Pld	W	D	L	GF	GA	GD	Win %
2026 Norwegian First Division	6 April 2026		Matchday 1	30	14	7	9	60	48	+12	46.67
2026–27 Norwegian Football Cup				0	0	0	0	0	0	+0	—
Total				30	14	7	9	60	48	+12	46.67

Last updated: 30 May 2026
Source: Competitions

=== First Division ===
Pos	Team	Pld	W	D	L	GF	GA	GD	Pts	Promotion, qualification or relegation
3	Kongsvinger	30	18	5	7	84	50	+34	59	Qualification for the promotion play-offs third round
4	Stabæk	30	18	4	8	70	38	+32	58	Qualification for the promotion play-offs second round
5	Odd	30	14	7	9	60	48	+12	49	Qualification for the promotion play-offs first round
6	Bryne	30	14	4	12	46	42	+4	46	Qualification for the promotion play-offs first round
7	Ranheim	30	12	5	13	74	72	+2	41	

Updated to match(es) played on 8 November 2026. Source: OBOS-ligaen (in Norwegian)
Rules for classification: 1) Points; 2) Goal difference; 3) Goals scored; 4) Head-to-head points; 5) Head-to-head goal difference; 6) Head-to-head goals scored.

==== Results summary ====
Overall								Home						Away					
Pld	W	D	L	GF	GA	GD	Pts	W	D	L	GF	GA	GD	W	D	L	GF	GA	GD
30	14	7	9	60	48	+12	49	7	4	4	32	19	+13	7	3	5	28	29	−1

Last updated: 8 November 2026.
Source: soccerway

==== Results by round ====
Round	1	2	3	4	5	6	7	8	9	10
Ground	H	A	H	A	H	A	H	A	H	H
Result	W	W	D	W	W	W	L	L	W	W
Position										

Updated to match(es) played on 30 May 2026. Source:
A = Away; H = Home; W = Win; D = Draw; L = Loss

==== Matches ====
6 April 2026 1	Odd	4–0	Sogndal	Skien
14:30	Noah Kojo 8'; Bojadzic 19'; Hans Christian Bonnesen (yellow card) 68'; Tewelde 76'; Daniel Söderberg (yellow card) 90+1'; Aas 90+1'	Report	Høyland (yellow card) 24'; Sturgeon (yellow card) 69'; Brás (yellow card) 69'	Stadium: Skagerak Arena; Attendance: 3,741; Referee: (Norway) Ali al Hatam

11 April 2026 2	Sandnes Ulf	1–3	Odd	Sandnes
14:00	Sundgot 31' (pen.); Nyhagen (yellow card) 38'; Mathias Sundberg (yellow card) 50'; Zifarlino Nsoni (yellow card) 72'; Ådne Bruseth (yellow card) 72'	Report	Tewelde 4' 65'; Jørgensen (yellow card) 28'; Samuel Skree Skjeldal 54'; Bojadzic (yellow card) 58'; Sebastian Hansen (yellow card) 90+3'	Stadium: Øster Hus Arena; Attendance: 1,428; Referee: (Norway) Ole-Alexander Valen

19 April 2026 3	Odd	2–2	Stabæk	Skien
17:00	Tewelde 25'; Daniel Söderberg (yellow card) 32' (goal) 68'; Buus (yellow card) 40'; Hans Christian Bonnesen (yellow card) 71'	Report	Brage Tobiassen (yellow card) 21'; William Nicolai Wendt (yellow card) 34'; Magnus Lankhof Dahlby 47'; Hanstad 71'; Næss (yellow card) 85'	Stadium: Skagerak Arena; Attendance: 3,742; Referee: (Norway) Anders Bodding

25 April 2026 4	Bryne	1–2	Odd	Bryne
20:00	Remi-André Svindland 1'; Strunck (yellow card) 34'; Patrick Wik (yellow card) 51'; Moreira (yellow card) 69'	Report	Bojadzic 67' (pen.); Jørgensen (yellow card) 78'; Noah Kojo 89'	Stadium: Bryne Stadion; Attendance: 1,401; Referee: (Norway) Johan Grundt

1 May 2026 5	Odd	1–0	Raufoss	Skien
	Rasmussen (yellow card) 10'; Buus (yellow card) 13'; Bojadzic 20'	Report	Naustdal (yellow card) 29'	Stadium: Skagerak Arena; Attendance: 4,144; Referee: (Norway) Per Heiberg

11 May 2026 6	Egersund	0–1	Odd	Egersund
19:00	Ekeland (yellow card) 59'; Scott Vatne (yellow card) 71'	Report	Villads Rasmussen 84'	Stadium: XL-BYGG Sørvest Arena; Attendance: 780; Referee: (Norway) Javi Mertens

16 May 2026 7	Odd	2–3	Moss	Skien
16:00	Tewelde 2'; Samuel Skree Skjeldal (yellow card) 15'; Daniel Söderberg 30' (yellow card) 84'; Buus (yellow card) 88'		Aga 36'; William Kvale 49'; Semmen 63'; Wilmer Olofsson (yellow card) 88'	Stadium: Skagerak Arena; Attendance: 5,443; Referee: (Norway) Ajdin Medić

20 May 2026 8	Kongsvinger	4–2	Odd	Kongsvinger
19:00	Frederik Christensen 56' (pen.) (yellow card) 57'; Rasmus Christiansen 68'; Andreas Dybevik (yellow card) 68'; Ludvig Langrekken 73'; Herman Udnæs 88'	Report	Buus 31'; Hinrik Hardarson 86'	Stadium: Gjemselund Stadion; Attendance: 1,900; Referee: (Norway) Eirik Wisted

25 May 2026 9	Odd	3–1	Ranheim	Skien
17:00	Tewelde 21'; Bojadzic 38'; Akogyeram-Fjeldberg 77'	Report	Johnsen 41'	Stadium: Skagerak Arena; Attendance: 5,126; Referee: (Norway) Ali Al Hatem

30 May 2026 10	Odd	3–0	Lyn	Skien
16:00	Tewelde 13', 76', 83'	Report		Stadium: Skagerak Arena; Attendance: 780; Referee: (Norway) Abdulhadi Al-Fahad

14 June 2026 11	Åsane	2–1	Odd	Bergen
16:00	Fismen 16'; Knut Haga (yellow card) 55'; Leonardo Rossi 58' (yellow card) 72'; Tobias Furebotn (yellow card) 80'; Malvin Ingebrigtsen (yellow card) 84'	Report	Samuel Skree Skjeldal 43' (yellow card) 73'	Stadium: Åsane Arena; Attendance: 349; Referee: (Norway) Magnus Koløy

21 June 2026 12	Odd	0–0	Hødd	Skien
16:00	Noah Kojo (yellow card) 80'	Report	Kinn (yellow card) 15'; Robertsen (yellow card) 44'; Mirza Mulac (yellow card) 66'	Stadium: Skagerak Arena; Attendance: 4,110; Referee: (Norway) Mohammad Hafezi

27 June 2026 13	Strømsgodset	2–2	Odd	Drammen
18:00	Mehnert 7'; Krasniqi (yellow card) 34'; Lamhauge (yellow card) 87'; Melkersen 89'; Stengel (yellow card) 90+5'	[	Daniel Söderberg (yellow card) 30'; Jørgensen 42'; Aas (yellow card) 46'; Jakob Vadstrup (yellow card) 71'; Hinrik Hardarson 87'	Stadium: Marienlyst Stadion; Attendance: 4,503; Referee: (Norway) Jan Tennøy

5 July 2026 14	Odd	1-3	Haugesund	Skien
16:00	Noah Kojo (yellow card) 36'; Bojadzic (yellow card) 66'; Hans Christian Bonnesen 83'	Report	Eirik Viland Andersen (yellow card) 19'; Nilsen 44'; Solheim (yellow card) 53'; Diarra 61' 88'; Almar Grindhaug (yellow card) 65'	Stadium: Skagerak Arena; Attendance: 3,620; Referee: (Norway) Stian Sletner

26 July 2026 15	Strømmen	0-0	Odd	Lillestrøm
17:00	Maximilian Balatoni (red card) 58'	Report	Tewelde (yellow card) 31'; Jakob Vadstrup (yellow card) 76'; Andersen (yellow card) 81'	Stadium: Strømmen Stadion; Attendance: 347; Referee: (Norway) Harald Sletner

2 August 2026 16	Odd	4-1	Åsane	Skien
17:00	Daniel Söderberg 9'; Tewelde 30'; Bojadzic 33' (pen.); Villads Rasmussen 39'; Samuel Skree Skjeldal (yellow card) 73'	Report	Hans Christian Bonnesen 26' (o.g.); Sebastian Brudvik (yellow card) 88'	Stadium: Skagerak Arena; Attendance: 2,956; Referee: (Norway) Martin Berg

10 August 2026 17	Moss	3-3	Odd	Moss
19:00	Julian Lægreid 49'; Håkon Vold Krohg 51'; Niclas Semmen 73'	Report	Bojadzic 3'; Tewelde 44'; Simenstad (yellow card) 82'; Samuel Skree Skjeldal (yellow card) 90'; Godwill Ambrose 90+3'	Stadium: Melløs Stadion; Attendance: 1,522; Referee: (Norway) Steinar Hauge

15 August 2026 18	Lyn	5-1	Odd	Oslo
16:00	Mathias Johansen 14'; Hellum 20' 23' (yellow card) 87'; Anders Bjørntvedt Olsen 43'; Julius Skaug 89'	Report	Daniel Söderberg (yellow card) 36'; Aas 74'	Stadium: Bislett Stadium; Attendance: 2,021; Referee: (Norway) Anders Bodding

=== Norwegian Football Cup ===
22 August 2026 First round	Teie	0-10	Odd	Nøtterøy
16:00		Report	Simenstad 9'; Tewelde 14' 35' 56'; Villads Rasmussen 18' 45+3'; Kasper Andersen 40' 45'; Aas 45+3'; Joakim Kjærgaard Kåfoss 58' (o.g.)	Stadium: Teie Xpert idrettspark Attendance: 700; Referee: (Norway) Pavel Breivik

== Statistics ==
=== Goalscorers ===
Rank	Pos	Player	1st division	NM Cup	Total
1	FW	(Norway) Faniel Tewelde	9	0	9
2	FW	(Norway) Sanel Bojadzic	5	0	5
3	MF	(Norway) Noah Kojo Akogyeram-Fjeldberg	3	0	3
