= Faniel =

Faniel is a given name and surname. Notable people with the name include:

- Faniel Tewelde (born 2006), Norwegian footballer
- Eyob Faniel (born 1992), Eritrean-born Italian long-distance runner
