= Eskil Skjeldal =

Norwegian writer (born 1974)

- Born: 1974 (age 51–52); Norway
- Education: PhD in theology
- Occupations: Writer, theology scholar, columnist
- Children: Samuel Skree Skjeldal
- Writing career
- Notable works: Eg slepper deg utan at du velsignar meg Fars hage, mors hus Byrået

Eskil Skjeldal (born 1974) is a Norwegian writer. He holds a PhD in theology, specialising in Danish theologians Søren Kierkegaard and K. E. Løgstrup.

== Career ==
Skjeldal has worked as a priest in Lofoten, but lost his faith and now works as a writer. He has written four novels and several nonfiction books, including an interview book with Nobel Prize winner Jon Fosse.

Skjeldal is a regular columnist for the Norwegian newspaper Dag og Tid. He has also appeared at literary festivals across Europe, including the Zagreb Book Festival and Amager Litteraturfestival.

== Selected works ==
- Eg slepper deg utan at du velsignar meg (2017)
- Mystery of Faith (original title: Mysteriet i trua – Ein samtale mellom Jon Fosse og Eskil Skjeldal) (2015)
- Fars hage, mors hus (2021)
- Byrået (2023)
- Bjørnebærstien (2024)
- Brødrene (2026)

== Personal life ==
He is the father of footballer Samuel Skree Skjeldal. The family moved from Henningsvær to Porsgrunn in 2009, and later to Skien.
