= Samuel Skree Skjeldal =

Norwegian footballer (born 2003)

Samuel Skjeldal
Personal information
- Full name: Samuel Skree Skjeldal
- Date of birth: 6 September 2003 (age 23)
- Positions: Left-back; right-back

Team information
- Current team: Odd
- Number: 13

Youth career
- Odd

Senior career*
Years	Team	Apps	(Gls)
2023–	Odd	70	(7)
- * Club domestic league appearances and goals as of 21 September 2026

Samuel Skree Skjeldal (born 6 September 2003) is a Norwegian footballer who plays as a full-back for Odds BK.

== Personal life ==
He is a son of two priests in the Church of Norway, his father Eskil Skjeldal also being a writer. He grew up in remote Henningsvær from 2005 to 2009, before the family moved to Porsgrunn and then Skien.

The day before he made his Odd league debut, his grandfather died.

== Club career ==
Skjeldal came through the youth ranks of Odds BK. He opted out of studying law to become a professional footballer. Skjeldal made his Eliteserien debut in May 2023 against Lillestrøm.

In 2024, he played many of the league games, but was often not a starter. Among others he was briefly hospitalized in July 2024, having collapsed on the field.
