= Jacob Buus =

Danish footballer (born 1997)

Personal information
- Full name: Jacob Buus Jacobsen
- Date of birth: 7 March 1997 (age 29)
- Place of birth: Odense, Denmark
- Height: 1.77 m (5 ft 10 in)
- Position: Right-back

Team information
- Current team: Odd
- Number: 2

Youth career
- Fraugde GIF
- OB

Senior career*
Years	Team	Apps	(Gls)
2016–2018	OB	1	(0)
2018–2020	Fredericia	59	(2)
2020–2021	Horsens	27	(2)
2021–2023	Beveren	26	(0)
2023–2024	Horsens	27	(0)
2024	Sønderjyske	11	(0)
2025–2026	Esbjerg fB	28	(0)
2026–	Odd	8	(1)

International career
2012	Denmark U16	2	(0)
2013–2014	Denmark U17	3	(0)
2016	Denmark U19	1	(0)
- * Club domestic league appearances and goals as of 7 July 2026

Jacob Buus Jacobsen (born 7 March 1997) is a Danish footballer who plays as a right-back for Norwegian First Division club Odds BK.

== Club career ==
=== OB ===
Buus started his career at Fraugde GIF as a youth player before joining OB as a U12 player. He signed a professional contract until the summer 2018 with OB on 22 March 2016, and was promoted to the first team squad.

Dreyer got his debut on 29 August 2017 in a 1–0 victory against Dalum IF in the Danish Cup, coming on in the second half to replace Ryan Laursen. He ended the game, making the assist to the winning goal. Buus played his first Danish Superliga game in March 2018 against AGF. These two games was also the only games he played for the club before it was announced, that Buus would leave the club by the end of his contract, which was on 30 June 2018.

=== FC Fredericia ===
Buus signed a 2-year contract with FC Fredericia in the Danish 1st Division on 10 July 2018, after a successful trial, playing two friendly games for the club.

=== AC Horsens ===
On 26 June 2020 Danish Superliga club, AC Horsens, confirmed that Buus would join the club on 1 August 2020, signing a deal until the summer 2023.

=== Waasland-Beveren ===
After a year in Horsens, Buus was sold to Belgian club Waasland-Beveren on 16 June 2021, signing a deal until the summer 2023.

=== Return to AC Horsens ===
On 23 January 2023, Buus returned AC Horsens, signing a deal until June 2026. One year after his arrival, in January 2024, Horsens terminated the agreement with Buus.

=== Sønderjyske ===
On 22 February 2024, Buus joined Sønderjyske on a short-term deal until the end of the season. On 31 May 2024 the club confirmed that Buus would leave the club when his contract expires at the end of the season.

=== Esbjerg fB ===
After six months without club, it was confirmed on 3 January 2025 that Buus had signed with Danish 1st Division side Esbjerg fB on a deal until June 2027.

=== Odds BK ===
On 8 February 2026, Buus signed with Norwegian First Division club Odds BK, joining the club as a new right-back. While the club did not disclose the length of the contract, Norwegian media reported that he had agreed to a two-year deal.
