= Ivan Mesík =

Slovak footballer (born 2001)

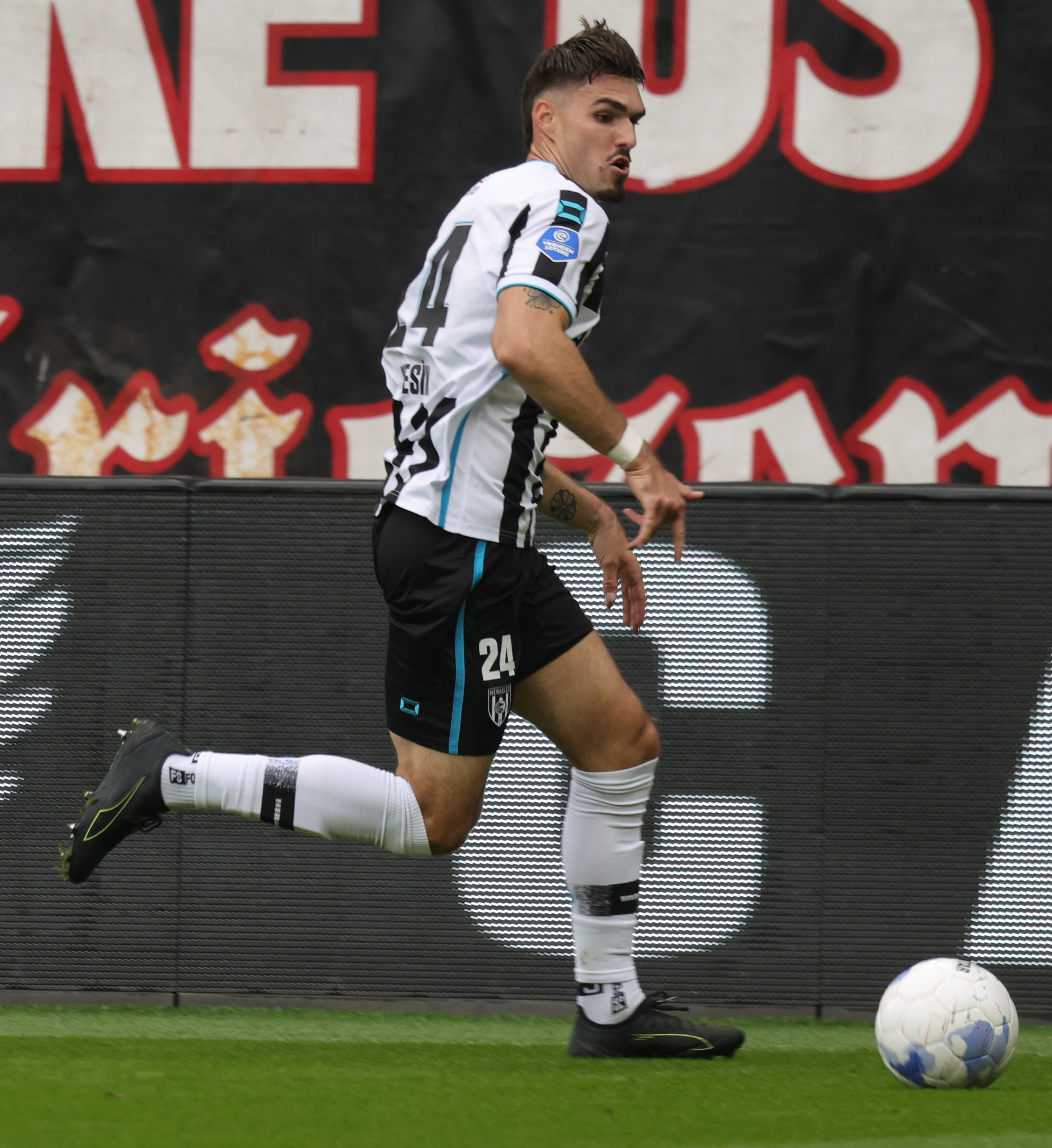
- Mesík with Heracles Almelo in 2025

Personal information
- Date of birth: 1 June 2001 (age 25)
- Place of birth: Banská Bystrica, Slovakia
- Height: 1.84 m (6 ft 0 in)
- Position: Centre-back

Team information
- Current team: Charlton Athletic
- Number: 18

Youth career
- 2009–2016: Dukla Banská Bystrica
- 2016–2019: Spartak Trnava

Senior career*
Years	Team	Apps	(Gls)
2019−2020	Spartak Trnava	17	(1)
2020–2023	Nordsjælland	38	(0)
2021	→ Stabæk (loan)	12	(1)
2022	→ Odd (loan)	10	(0)
2022	→ Odd 2 (loan)	12	(0)
2023–2024	Pescara	46	(0)
2024–2026	Heracles Almelo	63	(3)
2026–	Charlton Athletic	12	(1)

International career^{‡}
2017	Slovakia U16	3	(0)
2017–2018	Slovakia U17	10	(1)
2019	Slovakia U18	1	(0)
2018–2019	Slovakia U19	4	(0)
2020–2022	Slovakia U21	17	(1)
2025–	Slovakia	7	(0)
- * Club domestic league appearances and goals as of 17:10, 21 November 2026 (UTC) ‡ National team caps and goals as of 22:10, 16 November 2026 (UTC)

Ivan Mesík (born 1 June 2001) is a Slovak professional footballer who plays as a centre-back for EFL Championship club Charlton Athletic and the Slovakia national team.

== Club career ==
=== Spartak Trnava ===
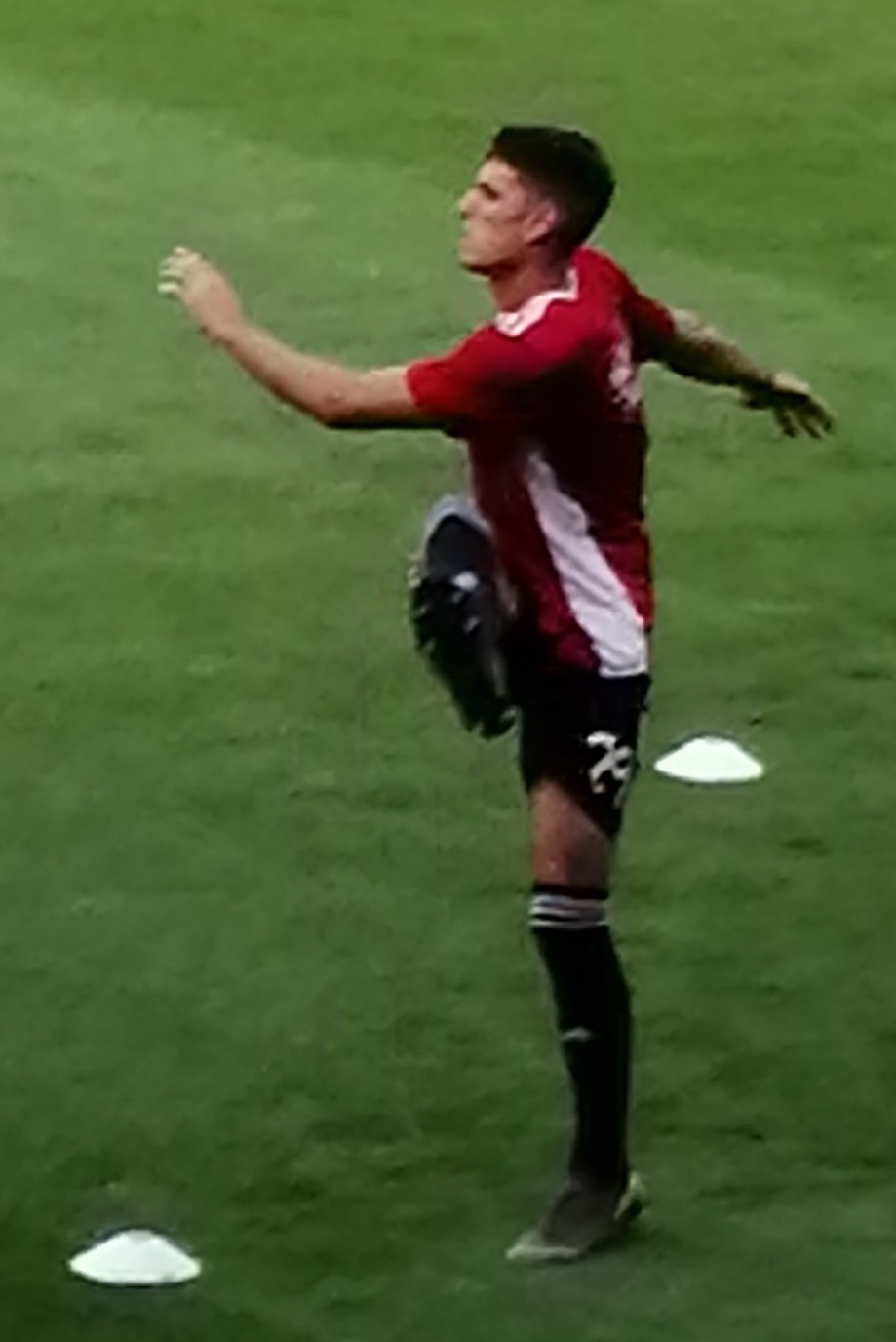
Mesík with Spartak Trnava in 2019

Mesík made his Fortuna Liga debut for Spartak against Nitra on 18 May 2019 playing the full 90 minutes of a 1–0 away win that was sealed by a goal by David Depetris. This was Mesík's only appearance in the season.

In the 2019–20 season, Mesík became a regular in the red-black jersey playing in 16 of 18 league rounds. He scored his first league goal against Nitra, in the third round, on 4 August 2019, in a 2–0 home win, after a corner by Marko Tešija. He also scored a goal against a third league side Jednota Bánová in the cup, in a narrow 3–2 win. He also made appearances in the pre-season Czechoslovak Supercup, against Slavia Prague, as a late replacement for Jozef Menich, as well as unsuccessful Europa League qualifying campaign, against both Radnik Bijeljina and Lokomotiv Plovdiv. Overall, by January, Mesík had collected 23 competitive starts and two goals for Spartak.

=== Nordsjælland ===
On 28 January 2020, it was announced that Mesík was leaving Spartak Trnava, aged 19-years-old, going on to sign a five-year deal with Nordsjælland, playing in the Superliga.

The club was battling for promotion for the season's championship group at the time of his arrival. Mesík became a second Slovak to feature for the club with Stanislav Lobotka playing there few years before.

On 31 August 2021, Mesík was loaned out to Norwegian club Stabæk Fotball for the rest of 2021.

=== Pescara ===
On 5 January 2023, Mesík signed for Serie C club Pescara on a permanent transfer.

=== Heracles Almelo ===
On 5 June 2024, Mesík joined Eredivisie club Heracles Almelo on a four-year contract.

=== Charlton Athletic ===
On 30 June 2026, Mesík joined Charlton Athletic on a four-year contract for an undisclosed fee.

== International career ==
On 7 June 2022, Mesík was called up to the Slovak senior team for the first time as an alternate following an injury of newly appointed national team captain Milan Škriniar. Mesík was to be available for two away UEFA Nations League fixtures against Azerbaijan and Kazakhstan on 10 and 13 June 2022. In the initial nomination by Štefan Tarkovič, who was fired from managerial duties on the same day following a home defeat to Kazakhstan on 6 June, Mesík was not even listed as an alternate, and therefore appeared with the Slovakia U21 team in a nomination by Jaroslav Kentoš.

Mesík made his senior debut for Slovakia in a Nations League match against Slovenia on 20 March 2025.

== Career statistics ==
=== Club ===
As of 21 November 2026

Appearances and goals by club, season and competition
Club	Season	League			National cup (Note: Includes Slovak Cup, Danish Cup, Norwegian Football Cup, Coppa Italia, KNVB Cup and FA Cup)		League cup (Note: Includes EFL Cup)		Continental (Note: Includes UEFA Europa League)		Other (Note: Includes Czech-Slovak Supercup and Coppa Italia Serie C)		Total	
Club	Season	Division	Apps	Goals	Apps	Goals	Apps	Goals	Apps	Goals	Apps	Goals	Apps	Goals
FC Spartak Trnava	2018–19	Slovak First Football League	1	0	0	0	–		0	0	–		1	0
FC Spartak Trnava	2019–20	Slovak First Football League	16	1	3	1	–		3	0	1	0	23	1
FC Spartak Trnava	FC Spartak Trnava total		17	1	3	1	0	0	3	0	1	0	24	1
Nordsjælland	2019–20	Superliga	11	0	0	0	–		–		–		11	0
Nordsjælland	2020–21	Superliga	27	0	0	0	–		–		–		27	0
Nordsjælland	2021–22	Superliga	0	0	0	0	–		–		–		0	0
Nordsjælland	2022–23	Superliga	0	0	0	0	–		–		–		0	0
Nordsjælland	FC Nordsjælland total		38	0	0	0	0	0	0	0	0	0	38	0
Stabæk (loan)	2021	Eliteserien	12	1	1	0	–		–		–		13	1
Odd (loan)	2022	Eliteserien	10	0	0	0	–		–		–		10	0
Odd 2 (loan)	2022	Norwegian Division 2 - Group 1	12	0	0	0	–		–		–		12	0
Pescara	2022–23	Serie C - Group C	13	0	0	0	–		–		0	0	13	0
Pescara	2023–24	Serie C - Group B	33	0	1	0	–		–		0	0	34	0
Pescara	Pescara total		46	0	1	0	0	0	0	0	0	0	47	0
Heracles Almelo	2024–25	Eredivisie	33	1	5	0	–		–		–		38	1
Heracles Almelo	2025–26	Eredivisie	30	2	3	0	–		–		–		33	2
Heracles Almelo	Heracles Almelo total		63	3	8	0	0	0	0	0	0	0	71	3
Charlton Athletic	2026–27	Championship	12	1	0	0	2	0	—		—		14	1
Career total			210	6	13	1	2	0	3	0	1	0	229	7

=== International ===
As of match played 16 November 2026

International statistics
National team	Year	Apps	Goals
Slovakia	2025	3	0
Slovakia	2026	4	0
Total		7	0
