= Syver Aas =

Norwegian football player (born 2004)

Personal information
- Date of birth: 15 January 2004 (age 22)
- Place of birth: Skien, Norway
- Height: 1.81 m (5 ft 11 in)
- Positions: Forward; midfielder

Team information
- Current team: Odd
- Number: 18

Youth career
- –2020: Odd

Senior career*
Years	Team	Apps	(Gls)
2021–	Odd	117	(6)
2023	→ Skeid (loan)	11	(0)

International career^{‡}
2019	Norway U15	8	(1)
2020	Norway U16	3	(2)
2021	Norway U17	4	(0)
2022	Norway U18	11	(0)
2023	Norway U19	4	(0)
- * Club domestic league appearances and goals as of 14 November 2026 ‡ National team caps and goals as of 7 July 2023

Syver Aas (born 15 January 2004) is a Norwegian footballer who plays for Odds BK.

== Career statistics ==
As of match played in January 2024

Club statistics
Club	Season	League			National Cup		Continental		Other		Total	
Club	Season	Division	Apps	Goals	Apps	Goals	Apps	Goals	Apps	Goals	Apps	Goals
Odd	2021	Eliteserien	11	1	4	0	—		—		15	1
Odd	2022	Eliteserien	24	0	4	0	—		—		28	0
Odd	2023	Eliteserien	4	0	0	0	—		—		4	0
Odd	2024	Eliteserien	5	1	3	0	—		—		8	1
Odd	Total		44	2	11	0	0	0	0	0	55	2
Skeid (loan)	2023	Norwegian First Division	11	0	1	0	—		—		12	0
Career totals			55	2	12	0	0	0	0	0	67	2
