= Abel Stensrud =

Norwegian footballer (born 2002)

Personal information
- Full name: Abel William Stensrud
- Date of birth: 23 May 2002 (age 24)
- Place of birth: Oslo, Norway
- Height: 1.83 m (6 ft 0 in)
- Position: Forward

Team information
- Current team: Östersund
- Number: 9

Youth career
- Hasle-Løren
- –2021: Skeid

Senior career*
Years	Team	Apps	(Gls)
2020–2021	Skeid	24	(22)
2022–2023	Odd	16	(2)
2023	→ Bryne (loan)	9	(3)
2023	→ Moss (loan)	6	(0)
2024–2025	TOP Oss	39	(8)
2025	Trapani	6	(1)
2025	Skeid	14	(5)
2026–	Östersund	17	(2)

International career
2022	Norway U20	2	(0)
- * Club domestic league appearances and goals as of 11 November 2026

Abel William Stensrud (born 23 May 2002) is a Norwegian professional footballer who plays as a forward for the Swedish Superettan club Östersund.

== Club career ==
Stensrud played youth football at Hasle-Løren and Skeid. In October 2020, he made his senior debut for Skeid in the Norwegian Second Division. After scoring 22 goals in 23 games in 2021, he signed a two-year contract with Odd in January 2022. On 10 April 2022, he made his Eliteserien debut in a 1–0 loss against Rosenborg.

On 10 January 2024, Stensrud signed a six-month contract with Dutch Eerste Divisie club TOP Oss, with an option to extend at the end of the season.

On 30 January 2025, Stensrud moved to Trapani in the Italian third-tier Serie C. After playing only six games for the Sicilians, he left Trapani by mutual consent on 18 July 2025.

Less than a month after he left Trapani, on 5 August 2025, he signed for his old club Skeid, now playing in the Norwegian First Division.

== International career ==
In March 2022, he made his international debut for the Norway under-20 national team.

== Career statistics ==
As of match played 25 May 2022

Appearances and goals by club, season and competition
Club	Season	League			Cup		Continental		Other		Total	
Club	Season	Division	Apps	Goals	Apps	Goals	Apps	Goals	Apps	Goals	Apps	Goals
Skeid	2020	Second Division	2	0	—		—		—		2	0
Skeid	2021	Second Division	22	22	1	0	—		—		23	22
Skeid	Total		24	22	1	0	—		—		25	22
Odd	2022	Eliteserien	7	0	1	1	—		—		8	1
Career total			31	22	2	1	0	0	0	0	33	23
