= Ole Erik Midtskogen =

Norwegian footballer (born 1995)

Personal information
- Date of birth: 12 April 1995 (age 31)
- Place of birth: Tynset, Norway
- Height: 1.98 m (6 ft 6 in)
- Position: Striker

Team information
- Current team: Kjelsås
- Number: 11

Youth career
- Tynset

Senior career*
Years	Team	Apps	(Gls)
2012–2016	Tynset	73	(21)
2016–2019	Hamkam	86	(11)
2020	KÍ Klaksvík	25	(8)
2021	Dundalk	12	(1)
2021–2022	Kjelsås	43	(29)
2023–2025	Odd	57	(4)
2025–	Kjelsås	41	(30)
- * Club domestic league appearances and goals as of 1 November 2026

Ole Erik Midtskogen (born 12 April 1995) is a Norwegian professional footballer who plays as a striker for Kjelsås.

== Career ==
Hailing from Tynset Municipality, Midtskogen started his career in Tynset IF and helped the senior team win promotion to the 2016 2. divisjon. In mid-2016 he moved on to Hamarkameratene on the same tier, finally winning promotion to the 2018 1. divisjon with the Hamar-based club. Following 3 league goals in 2018 and 2019 each, Midtskogen moved abroad. He spent 2020 with Faroese club KÍ Klaksvík before starting the 2021 campaign with Irish side Dundalk.

Being the only Norwegian in the Faroese top flight at the time, his stay there as well as in Ireland was marred by little social contact due to the pandemic.

In the late summer of 2021, Midtskogen moved to Norwegian third-tier side Kjelsås. Managing to score double digits in half a season, in his first full season for Kjelsås he became the runner-up top goalscorer in the 2022 2. divisjon, group 2, with 18 goals behind Sondre Sørløkk's 20.

Ahead of the 2023 season, Midtskogen was bought by Odd for a minuscule amount. Pundits questioned whether he could make a mark as a relatively old player on the highest Norwegian level. Midtskogen finally made his professional debut two days before his 28th birthday, away against Stabæk. Whilst not scoring during his first two games, he was lauded by pundits, including TV 2's Jesper Mathisen, for his physical play both offensively and defensively. His first goal came in June 2023, being the sole goalscorer of the match between Odd and Molde.

== Personal life ==
Midtskogen is nicknamed "Æljen", "the moose", owing to his physical stature as well as the moose being the municipal symbol of Tynset.

During his childhood, Midtskogen was a cross-country skier and finished among the top 10 in Hovedlandsrennet, a national competition for the 14 age group. During the same period, he was a football goalkeeper rather than a striker.
