= Casper Glenna Andersen =

Norwegian footballer (born 2005)

Personal information
- Full name: Casper Glenna Andersen
- Date of birth: 7 February 2005 (age 21)
- Place of birth: Porsgrunn, Norway
- Positions: Full-back; winger

Team information
- Current team: Odd
- Number: 11

Youth career
- -2021: Hei
- 2022–2023: Odd

Senior career*
Years	Team	Apps	(Gls)
2021	Hei	5	(1)
2021	Hei 2	2	(0)
2022	Odd 3	15	(11)
2022–	Odd 2	46	(6)
2023–	Odd	27	(0)
2025	→ Pors Fotball (loan)	12	(1)

International career^{‡}
2023	Norway U18	6	(0)
- * Club domestic league appearances and goals as of 14 November 2026 ‡ National team caps and goals as of 16 January 2024

Casper Glenna Andersen is a Norwegian professional footballer who plays as a full-back or winger for Odd.
