= Faniel Tewelde =

Norwegian footballer (born 2006)

Personal information
- Full name: Faniel Temesgen Tewelde
- Date of birth: 9 September 2006 (age 20)
- Height: 1.78 m (5 ft 10 in)
- Position: Forward

Team information
- Current team: Odd (on loan from Lommel)
- Number: 28

Youth career
- –2019: Herkules
- 2019–2021: Odd

Senior career*
Years	Team	Apps	(Gls)
2021–2022	Odd 3	7	(2)
2021–2023	Odd 2	39	(10)
2022–2024	Odd	36	(8)
2024–	Lommel	14	(0)
2026–	→ Odd (loan)	27	(16)

International career^{‡}
2021	Norway U15	7	(2)
2022	Norway U16	12	(5)
2023	Norway U17	11	(3)
2024	Norway U18	5	(3)
- * Club domestic league appearances and goals as of 14 November 2026 ‡ National team caps and goals as of 11:58, 26 July 2024 (UTC)

Faniel Temesgen Tewelde (born 9 September 2006) is a Norwegian professional footballer who plays as a forward for Odd, on loan from Lommel.

== Club career ==
Tewelde began his career with Herkules, before moving to Odd mid-way through the 2019 season. made his debut for Odd's third team in the 5. divisjon, the sixth tier of Norwegian football, on 24 August 2021, featuring in a 3–1 home loss to Urædd. In his second game, he scored two goals in a 6–1 win against Snøgg. Following an impressive start to his career with Odd's reserve team, he signed his first professional contract with the club in December 2021 at the age of fifteen, making him the youngest player to do so in the club's history.

The following season, having featured mostly for Odd's second team in the third-tier 2. divisjon, Tewelde made his professional debut for the senior squad; having come on as a substitute for Syver Aas in the second half of their Eliteserien game against Lillestrøm with the score at 0–0, he needed only four minutes to provide an assist for Mikael Ingebrigtsen to open the scoring. Five minutes later, his shot was saved by Lillestrøm goalkeeper Mads Hedenstad Christiansen, before falling to teammate Dennis Gjengaar who scored the game's second goal as Odd won 2–0. In December 2022, despite only having signed his first professional contract the year prior, he extended his deal, keeping him with the club until 2025.

Ahead of the 2023 season, Tewelde featured in a 2–1 friendly win against Jerv. His first goal for the club came in a 5–2 Norwegian Football Cup win against Notodden on 1 June. Three days later, he scored his first Eliteserien goal for the club, though it came in a 4–1 away loss to Sandefjord. Two months later, on 6 August, he scored in a 4–0 win against Stabæk; having come off the bench late into additional time with the score at 3–0, he took advantage of Stabæk goalkeeper Isak Pettersson coming up for a corner, and having received the ball on half-way from Leonard Owusu's deflected shot, he dribbled to the penalty area before slotting into an empty net.

In July 2024, Tewelde joined Challenger Pro League side Lommel on a three-year deal.

== International career ==
Tewelde has represented Norway from under-15 to under-17 level.

== Style of play ==
Tewelde has been described by journalist Robin Haugen as an extremely quick footballer with great dribbling ability.

== Career statistics ==
=== Club ===
As of 24 October 2026.

Appearances and goals by club, season and competition
Club	Season	League			Cup		Continental		Other		Total	
Club	Season	Division	Apps	Goals	Apps	Goals	Apps	Goals	Apps	Goals	Apps	Goals
Odd 3	2021	5. divisjon	6	2	–		–		0	0	6	2
Odd 3	2022	5. divisjon	1	0	–		–		0	0	1	0
Odd 3	Total		7	2	0	0	0	0	0	0	7	2
Odd 2	2021	2. divisjon	6	0	–		–		0	0	6	0
Odd 2	2022	2. divisjon	22	3	–		–		0	0	22	3
Odd 2	2023	2. divisjon	7	5	–		–		0	0	7	5
Odd 2	Total		35	8	0	0	0	0	0	0	35	8
Odd	2022	Eliteserien	2	0	1 (Note: Appearances in the Norwegian Cup)	0	–		0	0	3	0
Odd	2023	Eliteserien	20	5	3	1	–		0	0	23	6
Odd	2024	Eliteserien	14	3	3	2	–		0	0	17	5
Odd	Total		36	8	7	3	0	0	0	0	43	11
Lommel	2024–25	Challenger Pro League	4	0	1	0	–		0	0	5	0
Lommel	2025–26	Challenger Pro League	11	0	1	0	–		0	0	12	0
Lommel	Total		15	0	2	0	0	0	0	0	17	0
Odd (loan)	2026	OBOS-ligaen	24	15	2	3	–		0	0	26	18
Career total			116	33	11	6	0	0	0	0	137	39

== Honours ==
Individual

- Norwegian First Division Young Player of the Month: April 2026
