= Kevin Egell-Johnsen =

Norwegian footballer (born 2000)

Personal information
- Date of birth: 13 May 2000 (age 26)
- Place of birth: Norway
- Height: 1.82 m (6 ft 0 in)
- Position: Defender

Team information
- Current team: Sandnes Ulf
- Number: 2

Youth career
- –2012: Langesund
- 2012–2016: Stathelle
- 2016–2019: Odd

Senior career*
Years	Team	Apps	(Gls)
2016	Stathelle	9	(0)
2017	Odd 3	16	(1)
2018–2022	Odd 2	71	(3)
2019–2022	Odd	10	(1)
2022	→ Kongsvinger (loan)	19	(0)
2023	Arendal	17	(1)
2024	07 Vestur	14	(4)
2025–	Sandnes Ulf	22	(2)
- * Club domestic league appearances and goals as of 14 November 2026

Kevin Egell-Johnsen (born 13 May 2000) is a Norwegian professional footballer who plays as a defender for Sandnes Ulf.

== Club career ==
Egell-Johnsen made his senior debut playing for Stathelle in the fifth tier of Norwegian football. He signed a senior contract with Odd in the summer of 2019. He broke his leg, but returned to action in the summer of 2020. He made his debut in the 2019 Norwegian Football Cup and his league debut in October 2020 against Rosenborg. In his second game, in October 2020 against Aalesund, he scored a goal and had one assist.

The start of the 2022 season, up to September, was spent on loan at Kongsvinger. Released from Odd at the end of 2022, he went on trial with Kristiansund, Aalesund and Hamkam.

In January 2024, he joined Faroe Islands Premier League side 07 Vestur.
