= Thomas Rekdal =

Norwegian footballer (born 2001)

Personal information
- Full name: Thomas Grevsnes Rekdal
- Date of birth: 16 March 2001 (age 25)
- Place of birth: Wetteren, Belgium
- Height: 1.79 m (5 ft 10 in)
- Position: Midfielder

Team information
- Current team: Kjelsås
- Number: 7

Youth career
- Fredrikstad

Senior career*
Years	Team	Apps	(Gls)
2016–2018	Fredrikstad 2	5	(0)
2017–2018	Fredrikstad	31	(1)
2019–2021	Mainz 05 II	34	(3)
2021–2022	VfB Stuttgart II	26	(1)
2022–2025	Odd	15	(1)
2022–2025	Odd 2	23	(8)
2024	→ Tromsdalen (loan)	7	(3)
2025–2026	Tromsdalen	32	(9)
2026–	Kjelsås	12	(0)
- * Club domestic league appearances and goals as of 1 November 2026

Thomas Grevsnes Rekdal (born 16 March 2001) is a Norwegian footballer who plays as a midfielder for Kjelsås.

== Career ==
Before the second half of 2018–19, Rekdal signed for German fourth tier side Mainz 05 II. In 2022, he signed for Odd in the Norwegian top flight. On 6 August 2022, he debuted for Odd during a 7–0 loss to Bodø/Glimt.

== Personal life ==
He is a son of Sindre Rekdal and nephew of Kjetil Rekdal.
