= Solomon Owusu =

Ghanaian footballer (born 1995)

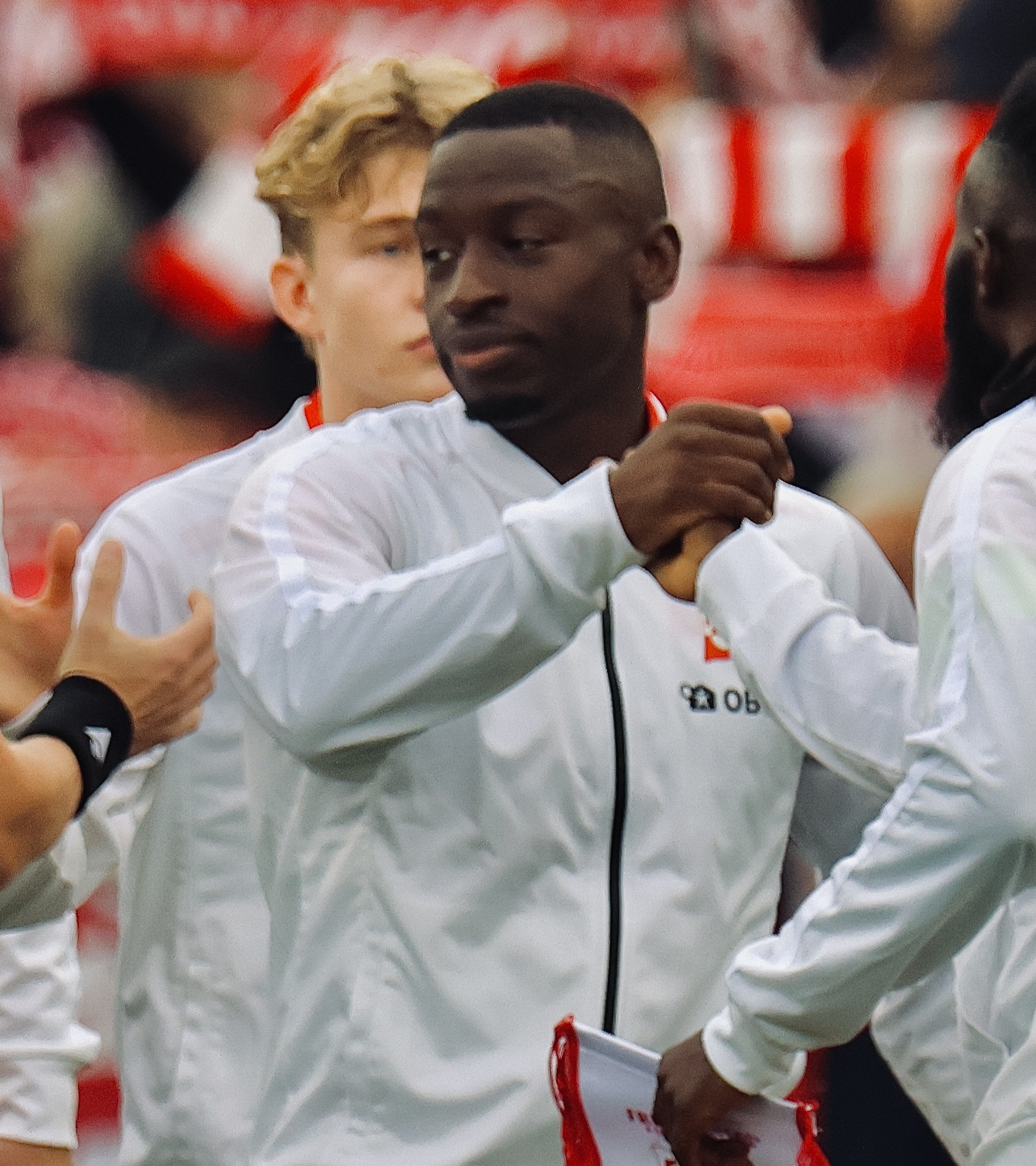

Personal information
- Date of birth: 28 October 1995 (age 31)
- Place of birth: Accra, Ghana
- Height: 1.76 m (5 ft 9 in)
- Positions: Defender; midfielder

Team information
- Current team: Fredrikstad
- Number: 28

Youth career
- Romsås
- –2015: Frigg

Senior career*
Years	Team	Apps	(Gls)
2015	Nordstrand	0	(0)
2016–2017	Follo	20	(0)
2018–2020	Raufoss	75	(1)
2021–2025	Odd	107	(4)
2025–	Fredrikstad	12	(0)
- * Club domestic league appearances and goals as of 23 July 2026

Solomon Owusu (born 28 October 1995) is a Ghanaian professional footballer who plays as a defender or midfielder for Fredrikstad.
