= Dennis Gjengaar =

Norwegian footballer (born 2004)

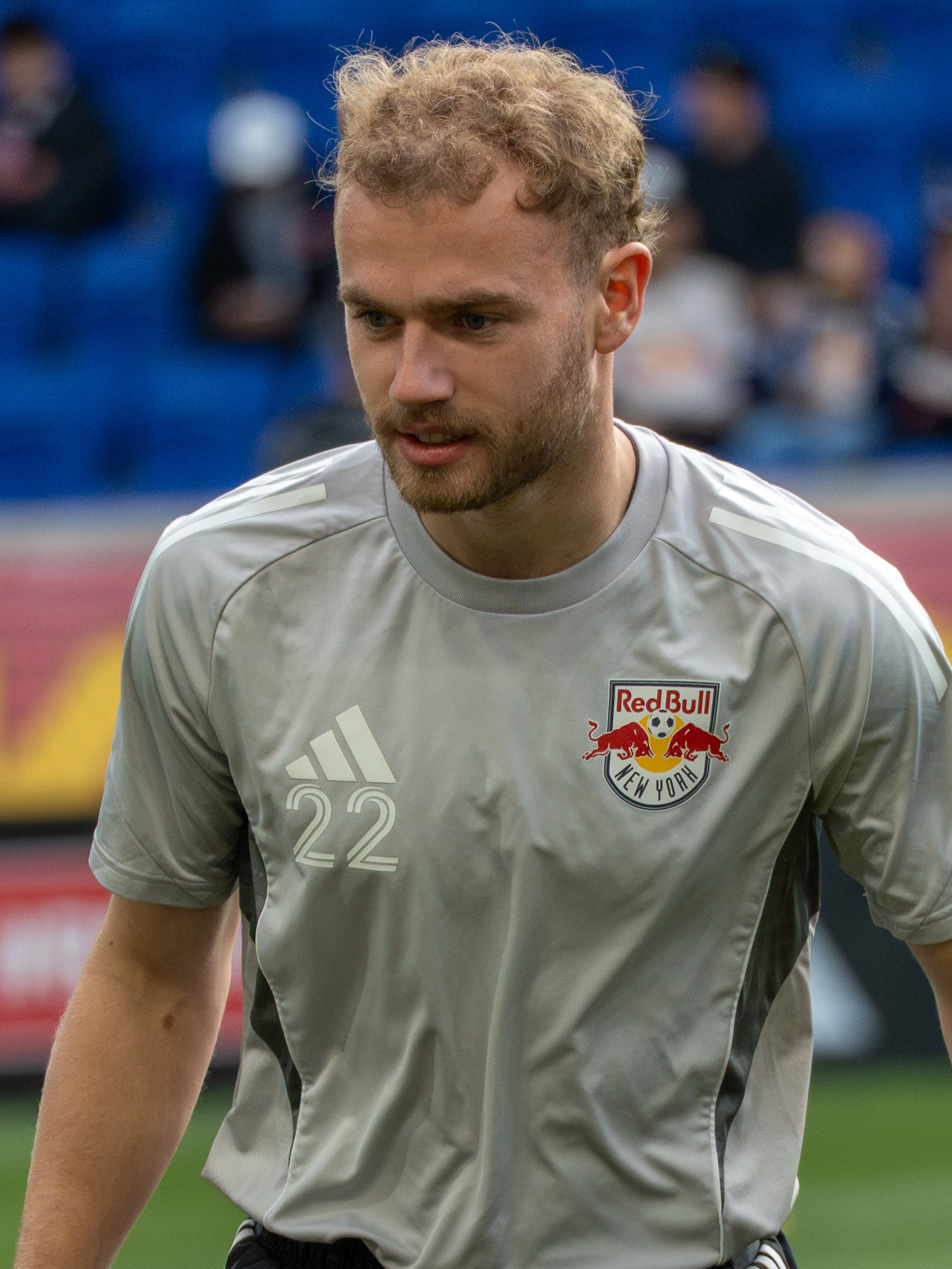
- Gjengaar in 2025

Personal information
- Date of birth: 24 February 2004 (age 22)
- Place of birth: Horten, Norway
- Height: 1.76 m (5 ft 9 in)
- Position: Right winger

Team information
- Current team: Vålerenga
- Number: 26

Youth career
- 2013–2019: Ørn Horten
- 2020–2021: Odd

Senior career*
Years	Team	Apps	(Gls)
2019	Ørn Horten	15	(1)
2020–2022	Odd 2	51	(3)
2022–2024	Odd	39	(7)
2024–2026	New York Red Bulls	46	(4)
2025–2026	New York Red Bulls II	21	(5)
2026–	Vålerenga	7	(0)

International career^{‡}
2019	Norway U15	3	(0)
2021	Norway U17	1	(0)
2022	Norway U18	8	(1)
2023	Norway U19	1	(0)
2023	Norway U20	1	(0)
2025–	Norway U21	4	(0)
- * Club domestic league appearances and goals as of 1 November 2026 ‡ National team caps and goals as of 14 November 2026

Dennis Gjengaar (born 24 February 2004) is a Norwegian professional footballer who plays as a right winger for Eliteserien club Vålerenga.

== Club career ==
=== Early career ===
Born in Horten, Gjengaar began his career with his home-town team Ørn Horten. While with Ørn Horten, Gjengaar made 15 appearances and scored one goal in the Norwegian Third Division. Gjengaar was the youngest player to debut with the first team of Ørn Horten, making his debut on 7 May 2019 against Vålerenga 2 at the age of 15 years and 68 days. He joined Odd during July 2020, where he continued his training. Gjengaar played in the Norwegian Second Division for Odd 2, making 51 appearances and scoring three goals.

=== Odds BK ===
On 25 February 2022, Gjengaar signed his first professional contract with Odd. Gjengaar made his first appearance with the Odds BK first team on 19 May 2022, in a Norwegian Cup match against Hei IL. He came on in place of Gilli Rólantsson as his team won 6–1.

On 10 September 2022, Gjengaar started his first match in the top flight Eliteserien, scoring his first two goals as a professional in a 3–1 victory against Sandefjord Fotball. His performance was praised after the match by his coach, Pål Arne Johansen, who cited that Gjengaar had great potential. On 2 October 2022, Gjengaar opened the scoring for Odd in a 2–2 draw against Haugesund. On 22 October 2022, Gjengaar continued his goal scoring run, opening the scoring for Odd in a 2–1 victory against Vålerenga. The following match day, 30 October 2022, Gjengaar scored his fifth goal of the season in a 2–0 victory against Lillestrøm.

For his second season with the first team, Gjengaar became a regular in the starting eleven for Odd. On 6 August 2023, he scored his first goal of the season in a 4–0 victory against Stabæk. On 27 August 2023, Gjengaar opened the scoring for Odd in a 2-2 draw against Vålerenga

=== New York Red Bulls ===
On 16 February 2024, it was announced that Gjengaar was transferred to Major League Soccer side New York Red Bulls for an undisclosed transfer fee, signing a four-year contract. On 22 June 2024, Gjengaar scored his first goal for New York in a 3–0 victory over Toronto FC.

On 15 March 2025, Gjengaar scored his first goal of the season for New York, the equalizing goal in a 2–2 draw with Orlando City SC. On 7 May 2025, Gjengaar scored for New York in a 4–1 victory over Colorado Springs Switchbacks FC, helping his club advance in the Lamar Hunt U.S. Open Cup.

== International career ==
Gjengaar has played in various Norwegian junior national teams, including the Norway under-19 team, Norway under-20 team and Norway under-21 team. Gjengaar played in the 2023 UEFA European Under-19 Championship qualification and the 2025 UEFA European Under-21 Championship qualification.

== Career statistics ==
As of match played 1 November 2026

Appearances and goals by club, season and competition
Club	Season	League			National cup (Note: Includes Norwegian Cup, U.S. Open Cup)		League cup		Other		Total	
Club	Season	Division	Apps	Goals	Apps	Goals	Apps	Goals	Apps	Goals	Apps	Goals
Ørn Horten	2019	3. divisjon	15	1	—		—		0	0	15	1
Odd 2	2020	2. divisjon	10	0	—		—		0	0	10	0
Odd 2	2021	2. divisjon	24	1	—		—		0	0	24	1
Odd 2	2022	2. divisjon	17	2	—		—		0	0	17	2
Odd 2	Total		51	3	—		—		0	0	51	3
Odd	2022	Eliteserien	10	5	2	0	—		0	0	12	5
Odd	2023	Eliteserien	29	2	3	0	—		0	0	32	2
Odd	Total		39	7	5	0	—		0	0	44	7
New York Red Bulls	2024	Major League Soccer	25	2	—		—		2 (Note: Appearance(s) in Leagues Cup)	0	27	2
New York Red Bulls	2025	Major League Soccer	21	2	3	1	—		1	0	25	3
New York Red Bulls	Total		46	4	3	1	—		3	0	52	5
New York Red Bulls II	2025	MLS Next Pro	3	0	—		—		—		3	0
New York Red Bulls II	2026	MLS Next Pro	18	5	—		—		—		18	5
New York Red Bulls II	Total		21	5	—		—		—		21	5
Vålerenga	2026	Eliteserien	7	0	2	2	—		0	0	9	2
Career total			179	20	10	3	0	0	3	0	192	23

== Honours ==
Individual

- Eliteserien Young Player of the Month: October 2022
