= Espen Ruud =

Norwegian footballer (born 1984)

Personal information
- Date of birth: 26 February 1984 (age 42)
- Place of birth: Porsgrunn, Norway
- Height: 1.82 m (6 ft 0 in)
- Positions: Right back; right wing back

Youth career
- Hei

Senior career*
Years	Team	Apps	(Gls)
2003–2008	Odd	86	(16)
2008–2014	OB	197	(19)
2015–2024	Odd	257	(36)

International career
2004–2006	Norway U21	13	(1)
2009–2014	Norway	35	(1)
- * Club domestic league appearances and goals as of 4 December 2024

Espen Ruud (born 26 February 1984) is a Norwegian former football defender who played mostly for Eliteserien club Odds BK.

== Club career ==
He joined the Odd Grenland from local team Hei in 2003. Ruud established himself in the Odd squad by 2005.

== International career ==
Ruud has 35 caps for his country on youth level including 13 caps for Norway U-21, and received his first call-up to the senior squad for the Euro 2008 qualifiers against Malta and Hungary.

He made his debut for Norway in a friendly match against Switzerland on 14 November 2009, and scored his first goal for Norway in a friendly match against Northern Ireland on 29 February 2012. Ruud received the Gold Watch after his 25th cap against Switzerland on 12 October 2012.

== Career statistics ==
As of match played 4 December 2024

Appearances and goals by club, season and competition
Club	Season	League			Cup		Continental		Total	
Club	Season	Division	Apps	Goals	Apps	Goals	Apps	Goals	Apps	Goals
Odd	2003	Eliteserien	2	0	0	0	—		2	0
Odd	2004	Eliteserien	9	0	1	1	2	0	12	1
Odd	2005	Eliteserien	21	1	5	0	—		26	1
Odd	2006	Eliteserien	24	5	1	0	—		25	5
Odd	2007	Eliteserien	23	8	5	1	—		28	9
Odd	2008	1. divisjon	7	2	2	0	—		9	2
Odd	Total		86	16	14	2	2	0	102	18
OB	2008–09	Superliga	31	4	0	0	—		31	4
OB	2009–10	Superliga	32	1	3	0	4	0	39	1
OB	2010–11	Superliga	32	6	1	0	9	0	42	6
OB	2011–12	Superliga	31	3	0	0	10	1	41	4
OB	2012–13	Superliga	32	3	2	0	—		34	3
OB	2013–14	Superliga	29	2	1	0	—		30	2
OB	2014–15	Superliga	10	0	0	0	—		10	0
OB	Total		197	19	7	0	23	1	227	20
Odd	2015	Eliteserien	28	4	4	1	7	1	39	6
Odd	2016	Eliteserien	29	5	3	0	4	1	36	6
Odd	2017	Eliteserien	28	3	3	0	6	0	37	3
Odd	2018	Eliteserien	29	8	4	0	—		33	8
Odd	2019	Eliteserien	24	1	4	1	—		28	2
Odd	2020	Eliteserien	27	6	—		—		27	6
Odd	2021	Eliteserien	21	2	3	0	—		24	2
Odd	2022	Eliteserien	26	3	3	1	—		29	4
Odd	2023	Eliteserien	24	4	2	0	—		26	4
Odd	2024	Eliteserien	21	0	0	0	—		21	0
Odd	Total		257	36	26	3	17	2	300	41
Career total			540	71	47	5	42	3	629	79

=== International goals ===
#	Date	Venue	Opponent	Score	Result	Competition
1	29 February 2012	Windsor Park, Belfast, Northern Ireland	Northern Ireland	0–3	0–3	Friendly
