= Filip Rønningen Jørgensen =

Norwegian footballer (born 2002)

Personal information
- Full name: Filip Rønningen Jørgensen
- Date of birth: 27 May 2002 (age 24)
- Place of birth: Norway
- Position: Midfielder

Team information
- Current team: Odd
- Number: 7

Youth career
- –2018: Kragerø
- 2019: Odd

Senior career*
Years	Team	Apps	(Gls)
2017–2018	Kragerø	12	(12)
2019	Odd 3	20	(6)
2019–2020	Odd 2	15	(2)
2020–	Odd	194	(18)

International career
2021–2023	Norway U20	8	(0)
2023	Norway U21	2	(0)
- * Club domestic league appearances and goals as of 14 November 2026

Filip Rønningen Jørgensen (born 27 May 2002) is a Norwegian professional footballer who plays as a midfielder for Norwegian First Division club Odd.

== Career ==
He grew up in Kragerø IF and made his debut for their senior team, as far down as the seventh tier of Norwegian football. In 2019 he joined Odd's youth system, only to make his first-team debut in June 2020 against Strømsgodset. In his second match, as a substitute, he was described by Nettavisen as "totally dominant". In the next match he was a starter.
