= 2021 FK Haugesund season =

Haugesund
2021 season
- Chairman: Leif Helge Kaldheim
- Head coach: Jostein Grindhaug
- Stadium: Haugesund Stadion
- Eliteserien: 10th
- Norwegian Cup: First round
- Top goalscorer: League: Ibrahima Wadji (8); All: Ibrahima Wadji (8)
Home colours	Away colours	Third colours

The 2021 season was FK Haugesund's 28th season in existence and the club's 12th consecutive season in the top flight of Norwegian football. In addition to the domestic league, FK Haugesund participated in this season's edition of the Norwegian Football Cup.

== Players ==
=== First team squad ===
Note: Flags indicate national team as defined under FIFA eligibility rules; some limited exceptions apply. Players may hold more than one non-FIFA nationality.

No.	Pos.	Nation	Player
1	GK	NOR	Helge Sandvik
2	DF	GAM	Sulayman Bojang
4	DF	DEN	Anders Bærtelsen
5	DF	DEN	Benjamin Hansen (captain)
6	DF	NOR	Joakim Våge Nilsen
7	MF	DEN	Peter Therkildsen
8	FW	NOR	Kevin Martin Krygård
9	FW	NOR	Sondre Liseth
10	MF	NOR	Niklas Sandberg
11	MF	NOR	Kristoffer Velde
12	GK	NOR	Egil Selvik

No.	Pos.	Nation	Player
13	MF	NOR	Martin Samuelsen
15	DF	NOR	Ulrik Fredriksen
16	FW	NOR	Alexander Søderlund
20	MF	NOR	Torje Naustdal
22	DF	NOR	Alexander Stølås
23	MF/DF	NOR	Thore Baardsen Pedersen
25	MF	SEN	Alioune Ndour
27	MF	NOR	Mads Berg Sande
32	GK	NOR	Frank Stople
35	FW	NOR	Andreas Endresen

== Transfers ==
=== Winter ===
In: Note: Flags indicate national team as defined under FIFA eligibility rules; some limited exceptions apply. Players may hold more than one non-FIFA nationality.

No.	Pos.	Nation	Player
7	DF	DEN	Peter Therkildsen (from (Denmark) Horsens, previously on loan)
9	FW	NOR	Sondre Liseth (from Mjøndalen)
12	GK	NOR	Egil Selvik (from Odd)
25	MF	SEN	Alioune Ndour (from Sogndal)
27	MF	NOR	Mads Berg Sande (loan return from Sandnes Ulf)

Out: Note: Flags indicate national team as defined under FIFA eligibility rules; some limited exceptions apply. Players may hold more than one non-FIFA nationality.

No.	Pos.	Nation	Player
3	DF	CIV	Benjamin Karamoko (to Sarpsborg 08, previously on loan at Aalesund)
7	MF	NOR	Christian Grindheim (retired)
9	FW	MLI	Ibrahima Koné (to Sarpsborg 08)
11	FW	DEN	Alexander Ammitzbøll (loan return to (Denmark) AGF)
20	FW	DEN	Oliver Klitten (loan return to (Denmark) AaB)
93	DF	NOR	Dennis Horneland (to Vard Haugesund, previously on loan)

=== Summer ===
In: Note: Flags indicate national team as defined under FIFA eligibility rules; some limited exceptions apply. Players may hold more than one non-FIFA nationality.

No.	Pos.	Nation	Player
2	DF	GAM	Sulayman Bojang (from Sarpsborg 08)
4	DF	DEN	Anders Bærtelsen (on loan from (Denmark) Vendsyssel)
13	MF	NOR	Martin Samuelsen (from (Denmark) AaB)
16	FW	NOR	Alexander Søderlund (from (Turkey) Çaykur Rizespor)
20	MF	NOR	Torje Naustdal (from Strømmen)
39	MF	NOR	Mathias Tjoland (promoted from junior squad)
—	MF	NOR	Christos Zafeiris (from Grorud)

Out: Note: Flags indicate national team as defined under FIFA eligibility rules; some limited exceptions apply. Players may hold more than one non-FIFA nationality.

No.	Pos.	Nation	Player
4	DF	NOR	Fredrik Pallesen Knudsen (to Brann)
16	MF	CPV	Bruno Leite (to (Cyprus) Pafos)
17	FW	SEN	Ibrahima Wadji (to (Azerbaijan) Qarabağ)
18	MF	NOR	Kristoffer Gunnarshaug (to Ull/Kisa)
19	MF	DEN	Mikkel Desler (to (France) Toulouse)
32	GK	NOR	Frank Stople (on loan to Stjørdals-Blink)
35	FW	NOR	Andreas Endresen (on loan to Vard)
—	MF	NOR	Christos Zafeiris (on loan to Grorud)

== Competitions ==
=== Eliteserien ===
==== Results summary ====
Overall								Home						Away					
Pld	W	D	L	GF	GA	GD	Pts	W	D	L	GF	GA	GD	W	D	L	GF	GA	GD
30	9	8	13	46	45	+1	35	8	3	4	30	17	+13	1	5	9	16	28	−12

Last updated: 12 December 2021.

==== Results by round ====
Round	1	2	3	4	5	6	7	8	9	10	11	12	13	14	15	16	17	18	19	20	21	22	23	24	25	26	27	28	29	30
Ground	A	H	A	H	A	H	A	H	H	A	H	A	H	A	A	H	A	H	A	H	A	H	A	H	A	H	A	H	A	H
Result	D	W	D	D	L	W	L	W	W	D	W	L	W	L	L	L	W	W	L	L	L	W	L	D	L	D	D	L	D	L
Position	6	7	6	5	11	6	9	5	6	6	5	6	5	6	8	8	8	7	7	8	9	8	8	8	9	10	9	9	10	11

A = Away; H = Home; W = Win; D = Draw; L = Loss

==== Matches ====
21 July 2021 1	Sandefjord	1–1	Haugesund	Sandefjord
19:00 CEST (UTC+2)	Risan 23'	Report	Ruud Tveter 58' (o.g.)	Stadium: Release Arena; Attendance: 2,000; Referee: Marius Hansen Grøtta

28 July 2021 2	Haugesund	2–1	Strømsgodset	Haugesund
19:00 CEST (UTC+2)	Velde 26'; Wadji 60'	Report	Friday 69'	Stadium: Haugesund Stadion; Attendance: 2,000; Referee: Kristoffer Hagenes

16 May 2021 3	Sarpsborg 08	0–0	Haugesund	Sarpsborg
15:00 CEST (UTC+2)		Report		Stadium: Sarpsborg Stadion; Attendance: 200; Referee: Rohit Saggi

24 May 2021 4	Haugesund	0–0	Stabæk	Haugesund
18:00 CEST (UTC+2)		Report		Stadium: Haugesund Stadion; Attendance: 600; Referee: Kristoffer Hagenes

27 May 2021 5	Bodø/Glimt	2–0	Haugesund	Bodø
18:00 CEST (UTC+2)	Botheim 31'; Solbakken 90'	Report		Stadium: Aspmyra Stadion; Attendance: 600; Referee: Kai Erik Steen

30 May 2021 6	Haugesund	4–2	Viking	Haugesund
20:00 CEST (UTC+2)	Velde 24', 60'; Wadji 64'; Ndour 90+1'	Report	Berisha 38' (pen.), 90+5'	Stadium: Haugesund Stadion; Attendance: 600; Referee: Rohit Saggi

13 June 2021 7	Lillestrøm	2–1	Haugesund	Lillestrøm
18:00 CEST (UTC+2)	Lehne Olsen 24', 43' (pen.)	Report	Liseth 21'	Stadium: Åråsen Stadion; Attendance: 600; Referee: Kai Erik Steen (first half) & Rohit Saggi (second half)

20 June 2021 8	Haugesund	3–0	Kristiansund	Haugesund
18:00 CEST (UTC+2)	Desler 63'; Wadji 71'; Sandberg 90+3' (pen.)	Report		Stadium: Haugesund stadion Attendance: 2,000; Referee: Marius Hansen Grøtta

24 June 2021 9	Haugesund	1–0	Brann	Haugesund
18:00 CEST	Wadji 74'	Report		Stadium: Haugesund Stadion; Attendance: 600; Referee: Mohammad Usman Aslam

30 June 2021 10	Rosenborg	0–0	Haugesund	Trondheim
18:00 CEST (UTC+2)		Report		Stadium: Lerkendal Stadion; Attendance: 4,461; Referee: Sivert Øksnes Amland

4 July 2021 11	Haugesund	3–0	Tromsø	Haugesund
18:00 CEST (UTC+2)	Ndour 30'; Therkildsen 69'; Liseth 78'	Report		Stadium: Haugesund Stadion; Attendance: 2,000; Referee: Kai Erik Steen

10 July 2021 12	Mjøndalen	3–0	Haugesund	Mjøndalen
18:00 CEST (UTC+2)	Ovenstad 20'; Eriksen 57'; Nakkim 77'	Report		Stadium: Consto Arena; Attendance: 1,350; Referee: Kristoffer Hagenes

18 July 2021 13	Haugesund	3–1	Vålerenga	Haugesund
18:00 CEST (UTC+2)	Krygård 54'; Wadji 57', 62'	Report	Dønnum 52' (pen.)	Stadium: Haugesund Stadion; Attendance: 2,000; Referee: Mohammad Usman Aslam

8 August 2021 14	Molde	5–4	Haugesund	Molde
18:00 CEST (UTC+2)	Omoijuanfo 11', 15', 48'; Hestad 29'; Eikrem 59'	Report	Sandberg 13'; Wadji 18'; Stølås 28'; Ndour 83'	Stadium: Aker Stadion; Attendance: 2,000; Referee: Ola Hobber Nilsen

15 August 2021 15	Odd	4–2	Haugesund	Skien
18:00 CEST (UTC+2)	Lauritsen 18', 45+2', 70'; Svendsen 62'	Report	Wadji 25'; Velde 53'	Stadium: Skagerak Arena; Attendance: 2,000; Referee: Mohammad Usman Aslam

22 August 2021 16	Haugesund	0–3	Lillestrøm	Haugesund
18:00 CEST (UTC+2)		Report	Gustavsson 21', 23'; Fredriksen 90+3' (o.g.)	Stadium: Haugesund Stadion; Attendance: 2,215; Referee: Sivert Øksnes Amland

28 August 2021 17	Brann	1–3	Haugesund	Bergen
20:00 CEST	Heggebø 69'	Report	Liseth 28'; Velde 30'; Ndour 81'	Stadium: Brann Stadion; Attendance: 3,466; Referee: Espen Eskås

12 September 2021 18	Haugesund	2–1	Sarpsborg 08	Haugesund
18:00 CEST (UTC+2)	Stølås 47'; Liseth 48'	Report	Koné 83'	Stadium: Haugesund Stadion; Attendance: 2,000; Referee: Tom Harald Hagen

18 September 2021 19	Kristiansund	3–2	Haugesund	Kristiansund
18:00 CEST (UTC+2)	Kartum 9'; Gjertsen 76'; Nilsen 89'	Report	Hansen 22'; Sandberg 50'	Stadium: Kristiansund Stadion; Attendance: 1,919; Referee: Marius Hansen Grøtta

26 September 2021 20	Haugesund	1–3	Odd	Haugesund
18:00 CEST (UTC+2)	Samuelsen 33'	Report	Josh. Kitolano 7'; Ruud 56'; Svendsen 71'	Stadium: Haugesund Stadion; Attendance: 2,797; Referee: Christian Moen

3 October 2021 21	Tromsø	2–0	Haugesund	Tromsø
18:00 CEST (UTC+2)	Stølås 28' (o.g.); Mikkelsen 33'	Report		Stadium: Alfheim Stadion; Attendance: 2,981; Referee: Tommy Skjerven

17 October 2021 22	Haugesund	7–0	Mjøndalen	Haugesund
17:00 CEST (UTC+2)	Hansen 22'; Ndour 26', 40', 45'; Samuelsen 69'; Søderlund 81', 85'	Report		Stadium: Haugesund Stadion; Attendance: 4,278; Referee: Sivert Øksnes Amland

24 October 2021 23	Vålerenga	2–1	Haugesund	Oslo
17:00 CEST (UTC+2)	Sahraoui 80'; Thomsen 87'	Report	Therkildsen 35'	Stadium: Intility Arena; Attendance: 5,035; Referee: Tore Hansen

27 October 2021 24	Haugesund	0–0	Rosenborg	Haugesund
18:00 CEST (UTC+2)		Report		Stadium: Haugesund Stadion; Attendance: 4,228; Referee: Marius Hansen Grøtta

31 October 2021 25	Stabæk	2–1	Haugesund	Bærum
18:00 CET (UTC+1)	Ottesen 76'; Bolly 84'	Report	Velde 69'	Stadium: Nadderud Stadion; Attendance: 1,953; Referee: Sigurd Smehus Kringstad

7 November 2021 26	Haugesund	2–2	Bodø/Glimt	Haugesund
17:00 CEST (UTC+1)	Søderlund 10'; Sande 90'	Report	Vetlesen 71', 87'	Stadium: Haugesund Stadion; Attendance: 5,166; Referee: Sivert Øksnes Amland

20 November 2021 27	Viking	1–1	Haugesund	Stavanger
18:00 CET (UTC+1)	Berisha 58'	Report	Velde 63' (pen.)	Stadium: Viking Stadion; Attendance: 13,126; Referee: Espen Eskås

28 November 2021 28	Haugesund	1–2	Sandefjord	Haugesund
17:00 CEST (UTC+2)	Liseth 1'	Report	Kurtovic 17'; Brenden 79'	Stadium: Haugesund Stadion; Attendance: 3,628; Referee: Marius Lien

5 December 2021 29	Strømsgodset	0–0	Haugesund	Drammen
17:00 CET (UTC+1)		Report		Stadium: Marienlyst Stadion; Attendance: 3,284; Referee: Christian Moen

12 December 2021 30	Haugesund	1–2	Molde	Haugesund
17:00 CET (UTC+1)	Risa 63' (o.g.)	Report	Omoijuanfo 37'; Brynhildsen 56'	Stadium: Haugesund Stadion; Attendance: 3,678; Referee: Espen Eskås

==== Table ====
Pos	Team	Pld	W	D	L	GF	GA	GD	Pts
9	Strømsgodset	30	9	9	12	43	43	0	36
10	Sandefjord	30	10	6	14	38	52	−14	36
11	Haugesund	30	9	8	13	46	45	+1	35
12	Tromsø	30	8	11	11	33	44	−11	35
13	Odd	30	8	9	13	44	58	−14	33

Source: Football Association of Norway (in Norwegian)
Rules for classification: 1) Points; 2) Goal difference; 3) Goals scored; 4) Head-to-head points; 5) Head-to-head goal difference; 6) Head-to-head away goals scored (only if between two teams); 7) Head-to-head goals scored; 8) Play-off (only used to decide champions or relegation).

=== Norwegian Football Cup ===
24 July 2021 First round	Stord	2–2 (a.e.t.) (7–6 p)	Haugesund	Leirvik
16:00 CEST (UTC+2)	E. Grov 66'; M. Pedersen 90+4'	Report	Fredriksen 23'; Sande 51'	Stadium: Stord Stadion; Attendance: 790; Referee: Jan Morten Tennøy
	Penalties
	M. Pedersen (penalty missed); S. Grov (penalty scored); A. Eide (penalty scored); J. Jensen (penalty scored); J. Stoknes (penalty missed); E. Johnsen (penalty scored); E. Grov (penalty scored); M. Rinne (penalty scored); J. Gjerde (penalty scored)		(penalty scored) Liseth; (penalty missed) Stølås; (penalty scored) Therkildsen; (penalty missed) Ndour; (penalty scored) Hansen; (penalty scored) T. Pedersen; (penalty scored) M. Tjoland; (penalty scored) Gunnarshaug; (penalty missed) M. Johannesen
