= 2019 FK Haugesund season =

Haugesund
2019 season
- Chairman: Leif Helge Kaldheim
- Manager: Jostein Grindhaug
- Stadium: Haugesund Stadion
- Eliteserien: 7th
- Norwegian Cup: Runners-up
- UEFA Europa League: Third-qualifying round vs PSV Eindhoven
- Top goalscorer: League: Two Players (6); All: Martin Samuelsen (13)
Home colours	Away colours

The 2019 season was Haugesund's 10th season in the Tippeligaen following their promotion in 2009.

== Season events ==
On 7 January, Eirik Horneland became manager of Rosenborg, with Jostein Grindhaug being announced as Haugesund's new manager the following day.

== Squad ==
As of 19 August 2019

Note: Flags indicate national team as defined under FIFA eligibility rules; some limited exceptions apply. Players may hold more than one non-FIFA nationality.

No.	Pos.	Nation	Player
1	GK	POL	Maciej Gostomski
2	DF	SWE	Doug Bergqvist (on loan from Östersund)
3	DF	CIV	Benjamin Karamoko
4	DF	NOR	Fredrik Pallesen Knudsen
5	DF	DEN	Benjamin Hansen
6	DF	NOR	Joakim Våge Nilsen
7	MF	NOR	Christian Grindheim
8	MF	NOR	Sondre Tronstad
10	MF	NOR	Niklas Sandberg
11	MF	NOR	Martin Samuelsen (on loan from West Ham)
12	GK	NOR	Helge Sandvik
13	MF	NOR	Kristoffer Gunnarshaug
14	MF	NOR	Torbjørn Kallevåg

No.	Pos.	Nation	Player
16	MF	CPV	Bruno Leite
17	MF	SEN	Ibrahima Wadji
18	DF	DEN	Pascal Gregor (on loan from Helsingør)
19	MF	DEN	Mikkel Desler
20	FW	MLI	Ibrahima Koné
22	MF	NOR	Alexander Stølås
23	MF	NOR	Thore Baardsen Pedersen
25	DF	NOR	Stian Ringstad
33	FW	NOR	Kristoffer Velde
34	MF	NOR	Kevin Martin Krygård
82	GK	DEN	Oskar Snorre (on loan from Lyngby)
93	DF	NOR	Dennis Horneland

=== Out on loan ===
Note: Flags indicate national team as defined under FIFA eligibility rules; some limited exceptions apply. Players may hold more than one non-FIFA nationality.

No.	Pos.	Nation	Player
21	FW	NGR	Shuaibu Ibrahim (on loan to Kongsvinger until 31 December 2019)
24	GK	NOR	Herman Fossdal (on loan to Djerv 1919 until 31 December 2019)

No.	Pos.	Nation	Player
35	MF	NGR	Anthony Ikedi (on loan to Nest-Sotra until 31 December 2019)

== Transfers ==
=== Winter ===
In: Note: Flags indicate national team as defined under FIFA eligibility rules; some limited exceptions apply. Players may hold more than one non-FIFA nationality.

No.	Pos.	Nation	Player
1	GK	POL	Maciej Gostomski (from (Poland) Cracovia)
2	DF	SWE	Doug Bergqvist (on loan from (Sweden) Östersund)
5	DF	DEN	Benjamin Hansen (from (Denmark) Nordsjælland)
10	MF	NOR	Niklas Sandberg (from (Norway) Start)
11	MF	NOR	Martin Samuelsen (on loan from (England) West Ham United)
13	MF	NOR	Kristoffer Gunnarshaug (from (Norway) Lysekloster)
17	FW	SEN	Ibrahima Wadji (from (Norway) Molde, previously on loan)
19	DF	DEN	Mikkel Desler (from (Denmark) OB)
23	MF	NOR	Thore Pedersen (from (Norway) Vard Haugesund)
33	FW	NOR	Kristoffer Velde (loan return from (Norway) Nest-Sotra)

Out: Note: Flags indicate national team as defined under FIFA eligibility rules; some limited exceptions apply. Players may hold more than one non-FIFA nationality.

No.	Pos.	Nation	Player
1	GK	NOR	Per Kristian Bråtveit (to (Sweden) Djurgården)
5	DF	CRO	Marko Cosic (to (Slovenia) Rudar Velenje)
9	MF	DEN	Frederik Gytkjær (to (Denmark) Lyngby)
15	MF	NGR	Izuchuckwu Anthony (on loan to (Norway) Nest-Sotra)
17	FW	NGR	Shuaibu Ibrahim (on loan to (Israel) Bnei Sakhnin, previously on loan at (Norway) Kongsvinger)
18	DF	NOR	Vegard Skjerve (retired)
19	DF	NOR	Kristoffer Haraldseid (to (Norway) Molde)
21	MF	NOR	Tobias Svendsen (loan return to (Norway) Molde)
24	GK	NOR	Herman Fossdal (on loan to (Norway) Djerv 1919)
33	FW	NOR	Kristoffer Velde (on loan to (Norway) Nest-Sotra)
77	MF	NGR	Babajide David (loan return to (Denmark) Midtjylland)

=== Summer ===
In: Note: Flags indicate national team as defined under FIFA eligibility rules; some limited exceptions apply. Players may hold more than one non-FIFA nationality.

No.	Pos.	Nation	Player
—	DF	NOR	Stian Ringstad (from (Norway) Strømsgodset)
18	DF	DEN	Pascal Gregor (on loan from (Denmark) Helsingør)
21	FW	NGR	Shuaibu Ibrahim (loan return from (Israel) Bnei Sakhnin)
82	GK	DEN	Oskar Snorre (on loan from (Denmark) Lyngby)

Out: Note: Flags indicate national team as defined under FIFA eligibility rules; some limited exceptions apply. Players may hold more than one non-FIFA nationality.

No.	Pos.	Nation	Player
21	FW	NGR	Shuaibu Ibrahim (on loan to (Norway) Kongsvinger)
35	MF	NGR	Anthony Ikedi (on loan from (Norway) Nest-Sotra)

== Competitions ==
=== Eliteserien ===
==== Results summary ====
Overall								Home						Away					
Pld	W	D	L	GF	GA	GD	Pts	W	D	L	GF	GA	GD	W	D	L	GF	GA	GD
30	9	13	8	44	37	+7	40	5	6	4	22	17	+5	4	7	4	22	20	+2

Last updated: 1 December 2019.
Source: see below

==== Results by round ====
Round	1	2	3	4	5	6	7	8	9	10	11	12	13	14	15	16	17	18	19	20	21	22	23	24	25	26	27	28	29	30
Ground	A	H	A	H	A	H	H	A	H	A	H	A	H	A	H	A	H	A	H	A	H	A	A	H	A	H	A	H	A	H
Result	L	D	W	W	L	L	D	W	D	W	D	L	L	D	W	D	L	W	L	D	D	D	D	W	L	D	D	W	D	W
Position	11	11	7	4	6	8	7	7	8	7	7	8	9	9	9	9	9	8	10	9	9	8	8	8	8	8	8	8	9	7

Updated to match(es) played on 1 December 2019. Source: see below
A = Away; H = Home; W = Win; D = Draw; L = Loss

==== Results ====
31 March 2019 1	Strømsgodset	3–2	Haugesund	Drammen
18:00 CEST (UTC+2)	Pedersen 2' (pen.) (yellow card) 29'; Glesnes (yellow card) 24'; Hove 33'; Abdellaoue 71'	Report	Stølås 25'; Sandberg 43'; Knudsen (yellow card) 87'	Stadium: Marienlyst Stadion; Attendance: 5,040; Referee: Ola Hobber Nilsen

7 April 2019 2	Haugesund	1–1	Sarpsborg 08	Haugesund
18:00 CEST (UTC+2)	Vasyutin 28' (o.g.); Hansen (yellow card) 85'	Report	Zachariassen 47' (yellow card) 79'	Stadium: Haugesund Stadion; Attendance: 3,671; Referee: Sigurd Smehus Kringstad

14 April 2019 3	Ranheim	0–2	Haugesund	Trondheim
18:00 CEST (UTC+2)	Kvande (yellow card) 90+3'	Report	Grindheim (yellow card) 49'; Samuelsen 88'; Wadji 89'	Stadium: EXTRA Arena; Attendance: 1,353; Referee: Tommy Skjerven

22 April 2019 4	Haugesund	3–0	Stabæk	Haugesund
18:00 CEST (UTC+2)	Bergqvist (yellow card) 22' (goal) 24'; Stølås 73'; Samuelsen 84'	Report	Demidov (yellow card) 40' (yellow-red card) 43'; Vihmann (yellow card) 71'; Kirk (yellow card) 90+2'	Stadium: Haugesund Stadion; Attendance: 4,020; Referee: Rohit Saggi

28 April 2019 5	Lillestrøm	1–0	Haugesund	Lillestrøm
18:00 CEST (UTC+2)	Ødemarksbakken 76'	Report		Stadium: Åråsen Stadion; Attendance: 4,828; Referee: Ola Hobber Nilsen

5 May 2019 6	Haugesund	1–2	Molde	Haugesund
18:00 CEST (UTC+2)	Samuelsen (yellow card) 24'; Koné 82'; Velde (yellow card) 90+3'	Report	Omoijuanfo 18' (pen.), 51', (yellow card) 90+3'; Forren (yellow card) 34'; Gabrielsen (yellow card) 80'	Stadium: Haugesund Stadion; Attendance: 3,772; Referee: Dag Vidar Hafsås

12 May 2019 7	Haugesund	1–1	Bodø/Glimt	Haugesund
18:00 CEST (UTC+2)	Kallevåg (yellow card) 23' (yellow-red card) 25'; Wadji (yellow card) 63'; Desler (yellow card) 73'; Stølås 76'	Report	Reitan (yellow card) 44'; J.Hauge 74' (pen.); Berg (yellow card) 77'	Stadium: Haugesund Stadion; Attendance: 3,777; Referee: Trygve Kjensli

16 May 2019 8	Rosenborg	0–2	Haugesund	Trondheim
18:00 CEST (UTC+2)	Lundemo (yellow card) 32'; Denić (yellow card) 62'	Report	Grindheim 45'; Knudsen 59'; Leite (yellow card) 88'	Stadium: Lerkendal Stadion; Attendance: 17,799; Referee: Trond Ivar Døvle

19 May 2019 9	Haugesund	0–0	Kristiansund	Haugesund
18:00 CEST (UTC+2)	Desler (yellow card) 70'	Report	Isaksen (yellow card) 35'	Stadium: Haugesund Stadion; Attendance: 4,559; Referee: Rohit Saggi

26 May 2019 10	Mjøndalen	1–4	Haugesund	Mjøndalen
18:00 CEST (UTC+2)	Aasmundsen (yellow card) 64'; Solberg (yellow card) 66' (yellow-red card) 69'; Occéan 76'	Report	Wadji 21', 41', 72'; Leite 86'	Stadium: Consto Arena; Attendance: 1,963; Referee: Espen Eskås

15 June 2019 11	Haugesund	1–1	Brann	Haugesund
18:00 CEST (UTC+2)	Leite (yellow card) 51'; Tronstad 62'; Samuelsen (yellow card) 80'	Report	Wormgoor (penalty missed) 37' 37'; Teniste (yellow card) 43'	Stadium: Haugesund Stadion; Attendance: 7,001; Referee: Tom Harald Hagen

23 June 2019 12	Odd	3–1	Haugesund	Skien
18:00 CEST (UTC+2)	Jensen (yellow card) 29'; Nordkvelle 36', 71'; Børven 60'	Report	Leite 52'; Desler (yellow card) 73'; Velde (yellow card) 87'	Stadium: Skagerak Arena; Attendance: 5,589; Referee: Espen Eskås

30 June 2019 13	Haugesund	1–4	Vålerenga	Haugesund
18:00 CEST (UTC+2)	Koné 77'	Report	Finne 14', 41'; Dønnum 39' (yellow card) 76'; Juárez (yellow card) 41'; Ejuke 61'; Borchgrevink (yellow card) 79'; Shala (yellow card) 87'	Stadium: Haugesund Stadion; Attendance: 3,817; Referee: Kristoffer Hagenes

5 July 2019 14	Viking	0–0	Haugesund	Stavanger
20:00 CEST (UTC+2)	Høiland (yellow card) 58'; Hove (yellow card) 90+2'	Report	Tronstad (yellow card) 34'; Leite (yellow card) 75'; Velde (yellow card) 87'; Krygård (yellow card) 90+4'	Stadium: Viking Stadion; Attendance: 8,169; Referee: Espen Eskås

14 July 2019 15	Haugesund	5–1	Tromsø	Haugesund
18:00 CEST (UTC+2)	Koné 31', 86'; Hansen 39'; Karlstrøm 45+2' (o.g.); Kallevåg 63'	Report	Taylor 37'; Antonsen (yellow card) 38'; Valakari (yellow card) 41'; Pirinen (yellow card) 42'	Stadium: Haugesund Stadion; Attendance: 3,421; Referee: Trygve Kjensli

4 August 2019 16	Stabæk	1–1	Haugesund	Bærum
18:00 CEST (UTC+2)	Hanche-Olsen 49'	Report	Koné (yellow card) 48'; Leite (yellow card) 63'; Velde 69'; Kallevåg (yellow card) 73'	Stadium: Nadderud Stadion; Attendance: 3,153; Referee: Trond Ivar Døvle

11 August 2019 17	Haugesund	0–1	Ranheim	Haugesund
18:00 CEST (UTC+2)	Kallevåg (yellow card) 48'; Koné (yellow card) 55'	Report	Dønnem (yellow card) 45' (goal) 75'	Stadium: Haugesund Stadion; Attendance: 3,305; Referee: Rohit Saggi

18 August 2019 18	Vålerenga	1–2	Haugesund	Oslo
18:00 CEST (UTC+2)	Shala 2' (yellow card) 35'; Bjørdal (yellow card) 53'; Näsberg (yellow card) 84'	Report	Krygård (yellow card) 34'; Sandberg 48'; Tronstad (yellow card) 55'; Velde 64'	Stadium: Intility Arena; Attendance: 7,304; Referee: Dag Vidar Hafsås

25 August 2019 19	Haugesund	0–2	Lillestrøm	Haugesund
18:00 CEST (UTC+2)	Koné (yellow card) 46'	Report	Ødemarksbakken (yellow card) 21'; Salquist (yellow card) 35'; Olsen 64'; Haakenstad 87'; Brenden (yellow card) 90+1'	Stadium: Haugesund Stadion; Attendance: 4,045; Referee: Ola Hobber Nilsen

1 September 2019 20	Tromsø	2–2	Haugesund	Tromsø
18:00 CEST (UTC+2)	Azemi 7'; Barlow 46' (yellow card) 69'; Taylor (yellow card) 60'; Kongshavn (yellow card) 61'	Report	Krygård 58'; Grindheim 70'	Stadium: Alfheim Stadion; Attendance: 3,245; Referee: Trond Ivar Døvle

15 September 2019 21	Haugesund	0–0	Mjøndalen	Haugesund
18:00 CEST (UTC+2)	Samuelsen (yellow card) 84'	Report		Stadium: Haugesund Stadion; Attendance: 3,512; Referee: Tore Hansen

21 September 2019 22	Brann	0–0	Haugesund	Bergen
18:00 CEST (UTC+2)	Jenssen (yellow card) 9'; Heggebø (yellow card) 47'	Report	Desler (yellow card) 74'	Stadium: Brann Stadion; Attendance: 10,129; Referee: Rohit Saggi

29 September 2019 23	Kristiansund	2–2	Haugesund	Kristiansund
18:00 CEST (UTC+2)	Pellegrino 11'; P.Ulvestad (yellow card) 46'; Gjertsen 85'	Report	Ringstad (yellow card) 37'; Samuelsen 50', 63'	Stadium: Kristiansund Stadion; Attendance: 3,952; Referee: Sigurd Smehus Kringstad

6 October 2019 24	Haugesund	2–1	Rosenborg	Haugesund
18:00 CEST (UTC+2)	Bergqvist (yellow card) 15'; Grindheim (yellow card) 49'; Sandberg 56'; Samuelsen 85'	Report	Lundemo (yellow card) 52'; Johnsen 84'	Stadium: Haugesund Stadion; Attendance: 5,322; Referee: Trond Ivar Døvle

20 October 2019 25	Molde	3–1	Haugesund	Molde
18:00 CEST (UTC+2)	Hussain 37', 71'; E.Hestad (yellow card) 41'; Omoijuanfo 73'	Report	Gregor 44'	Stadium: Aker Stadion; Attendance: 6,304; Referee: Ola Hobber Nilsen

27 October 2019 26	Haugesund	2–2	Strømsgodset	Haugesund
18:00 CEST (UTC+2)	Pedersen (yellow card) 8'; Sandberg 28' (pen.); Tronstad (yellow card) 39'; Grindheim 66'; Desler (yellow card) 90+2'	Report	Salvesen 7', 32'; Stengel (yellow card) 18'; Mawa (yellow card) 57'	Stadium: Haugesund Stadion; Attendance: 3,465; Referee: Trygve Kjensli

3 November 2019 27	Bodø/Glimt	2–2	Haugesund	Bodø
18:00 CET (UTC+1)	Evjen 10'; Hauge 17'; Bjørkan (yellow card) 34' (yellow-red card) 73'; Boniface (yellow card) 58'	Report	Velde 19'; Bergan 79' (o.g.); Tronstad (yellow card) 87'	Stadium: Aspmyra Stadion; Attendance: 2,777; Referee: Tom Harald Hagen

9 November 2019 28	Haugesund	1–0	Viking	Haugesund
18:00 CEST (UTC+2)	Sandberg 80' (pen.)	Report		Stadium: Haugesund Stadion; Attendance: 5,742; Referee: Ola Hobber Nilsen

24 November 2019 29	Sarpsborg 08	1–1	Haugesund	Sarpsborg
18:00 CET (UTC+2)	Zachariassen 17'	Report	Pedersen (yellow card) 21'; Samuelsen 75'	Stadium: Sarpsborg Stadion; Attendance: 5,924; Referee: Trygve Kjensli

1 December 2019 30	Haugesund	4–1	Odd	Haugesund
18:00 CET (UTC+1)	Sandberg 22' (pen.); Tronstad (yellow card) 55'; Velde 61'; Desler 65'; Koné 89'	Report	Jensen (yellow card) 22'; Kaasa 27' (yellow card) 49'; Hagen (yellow card) 64'	Stadium: Haugesund Stadion; Attendance: 3,358; Referee: Kristoffer Hagenes

==== Table ====
Pos	Team	Pld	W	D	L	GF	GA	GD	Pts	Qualification or relegation
5	Viking	30	13	8	9	55	42	+13	47	Qualification for the Europa League second qualifying round (Note: Viking qualified for the Europa League second qualifying round as winners of the 2019 Norwegian Cup.)
6	Kristiansund	30	11	8	11	41	41	0	41	
7	Haugesund	30	9	13	8	44	37	+7	40	
8	Stabæk	30	10	10	10	38	36	+2	40	
9	Brann	30	10	10	10	32	37	−5	40	

Source: Football Association of Norway (in Norwegian), Soccerway
Rules for classification: 1) Points; 2) Goal difference; 3) Goals scored; 4) Head-to-head points; 5) Head-to-head goal difference; 6) Head-to-head away goals scored (only if between two teams); 7) Head-to-head goals scored; 8) Play-off (only used to decide champions or relegation).

=== Norwegian Cup ===
1 May 2019 First Round	Åkra	0–4	Haugesund	Åkrehamn
18:00 CEST (UTC+2)	J.Rasmussen (penalty missed) 4'; S.Haavik (yellow card) 7'; E.Drivenes (yellow card) 61'	Report	Samuelsen (penalty missed) 6' 10', 60'; Koné 59' (pen.); Leite (yellow card) 71'; Langåker Underhaug 78' (o.g.)	Stadium: Åkra Kunstgress; Attendance: 1,200; Referee: Aleksander S. Vermundsen

22 May 2019 Second Round	Sotra	1–3	Haugesund	Sotra
18:00 CEST (UTC+2)	Flo (yellow card) 21'; Stava 49'; Ø.Nilsen (yellow card) 60'	Report	Wadji 36'; Sandberg (yellow card) 60'; Krygård 63', 74'	Stadium: Straume Idrettspark; Referee: Steinar Hauge

19 June 2019 Third Round	Bryne	2–6	Haugesund	Bryne
19:00 CEST (UTC+2)	V.Myhre (yellow card) 60' el Ghaouti 65', 67'	Report	Velde 3', 64' (yellow card) 69'; Samuelsen 5', 16' (yellow card) 26'; Sandberg 38'; Kallevåg 90'	Stadium: Bryne Stadion; Attendance: 504; Referee: Tore Hansen

26 June 2019 Fourth Round	Haugesund	2–0 (a.e.t.)	Strømmen	Haugesund
18:00 CEST (UTC+2)	Leite (yellow card) 44'; Velde (yellow card) 75'; Ibrahima Koné 112'; Bergqvist (yellow card) 115'; Samuelsen 116'	Report	Grodås (yellow card) 75'; M.Tvedte (yellow card) 90+3'; Ø.Vestvatn (yellow card) 111'	Stadium: Haugesund Stadion; Attendance: 1,875; Referee: Sigurd Smehus Kringstad

25 September 2019 Quarterfinal	Mjøndalen	1–3	Haugesund	Mjøndalen
20:00 CEST (UTC+2)	Solberg (yellow card) 51'; Bergström (yellow card) 77'; Occéan 84'	Report	Pedersen 18'; Tronstad (yellow card) 23'; Samuelsen 65'; Krygård (yellow card) 82'; Kallevåg 86'	Stadium: Consto Arena; Attendance: 1,141; Referee: Kristoffer Hagenes

31 October 2019 Semifinal	Odd	0–3	Haugesund	Skien
20:00 CET (UTC+1)	Rashani (yellow card) 29'	Report	Hansen (yellow card) 29'; Sandberg 49' (pen.); Samuelsen 83'; Tronstad 89'	Stadium: Skagerak Arena; Attendance: 8,702; Referee: Tore Hansen

==== Final ====
8 December 2019	Haugesund	0–1	Viking	Oslo
13:15 CET (UTC+1)	Hansen (yellow card) 35'; Bergqvist (yellow card) 43'; Desler (yellow card) 50'; Samuelsen (yellow card) 72'; Tronstad (yellow card) 90'	Report	Pereira (yellow card) 25'; Hove (yellow card) 46'; Tripić 51' (pen.) (yellow card) 55'; Løkberg (yellow card) 61'; Vevatne (yellow card) 87'	Stadium: Ullevaal Stadion; Attendance: 21,895; Referee: Espen Eskås

=== Europa League ===
==== Qualifying rounds ====
11 July 2019 First qualifying round 1st leg	Cliftonville (Northern Ireland)	0–1	(Norway) Haugesund	Belfast, Northern Ireland
20:45 CEST (UTC+2)	R.Donnelly (yellow card) 37'; G.Breen (yellow card) 76'; C.McMenamin (yellow card) 86'	Report	Koné (yellow card) 24'; Grindheim 42'; Sandberg (yellow card) 54'; Kallevåg (red card) 79'	Stadium: Solitude; Attendance: 1,342; Referee: Laurent Kopriwa (Luxembourg)

18 July 2019 First qualifying round 2nd leg	Haugesund (Norway)	5–1 (6–1 agg.)	(Northern Ireland) Cliftonville	Haugesund, Norway
19:00 CEST (UTC+2)	Velde 5', 68'; Sandberg 36'; Koné 45+1'; Leite 52'	Report	L.Ives (yellow card) 9'; McMenamin 17'; L.Bagnall (yellow card) 25'; C.McDermott (yellow card) 45'; R.Donnelly (yellow card) 80'; R.Wilson (yellow card) 85'	Stadium: Haugesund Stadion; Attendance: 2,633; Referee: Mario Zebec (Croatia)

25 July 2019 Second qualifying round 1st leg	Haugesund (Norway)	2–0	(Austria) Sturm Graz	Haugesund, Norway
19:00 CEST (UTC+2)	Koné (yellow card) 36'; Krygård 51'; Sandberg 64'; Samuelsen (yellow card) 77'	Report	Sakic (yellow card) 13'; Schrammel (yellow card) 20'; Domínguez (yellow card) 39'; Ljubic (yellow card) 90+5'	Stadium: Haugesund Stadion; Attendance: 3,501; Referee: Donatas Rumšas (Lithuania)

1 August 2019 Second qualifying round 2nd leg	Sturm Graz (Austria)	2–1 (2–3 agg.)	(Norway) Haugesund	Graz, Austria
20:30 CEST (UTC+2)	Sandberg 15' (o.g.); Ljubic 48'	Report	Desler (yellow card) 22'; Krygård 68'	Stadium: Liebenauer Stadium; Attendance: 2,000; Referee: Juri Frischer (Estonia)

8 August 2019 Third qualifying round 1st leg	Haugesund (Norway)	0–1	(Netherlands) PSV Eindhoven	Haugesund, Norway
19:00 CEST (UTC+2)	Bergqvist (yellow card) 23'	Report	Rosario (yellow card) 17'; Bergwijn 24' (pen.); Malen (yellow card) 35'; Lozano (yellow card) 69'	Stadium: Haugesund Stadion; Attendance: 5,150; Referee: Matej Jug (Slovenia)

15 August 2019 Third qualifying round 2nd leg	PSV Eindhoven (Netherlands)	0–0 (1–0 agg.)	(Norway) Haugesund	Eindhoven, Netherlands
20:30 CEST (UTC+2)	Sadílek (yellow card) 90+2'	Report		Stadium: Philips Stadion; Attendance: 22,759; Referee: Juan Martínez Munuera (Spain)

== Squad statistics ==
As of match played 8 December 2019

=== Appearances and goals ===
No.	Pos	Nat	Player	Total		Eliteserien		Norwegian Cup		Europa League	
No.	Pos	Nat	Player	Apps	Goals	Apps	Goals	Apps	Goals	Apps	Goals
1	GK	(Poland) POL	Maciej Gostomski	2	0	0	0	2	0	0	0
2	DF	(Sweden) SWE	Doug Bergqvist	34	1	16+5	1	7	0	6	0
4	DF	(Norway) NOR	Fredrik Knudsen	17	1	12+1	1	2	0	0+2	0
5	DF	(Denmark) DEN	Benjamin Hansen	43	1	30	1	7	0	6	0
6	DF	(Norway) NOR	Joakim Nilsen	18	0	5+8	0	2	0	0+3	0
7	MF	(Norway) NOR	Christian Grindheim	36	4	25+3	3	4+1	0	1+2	1
8	MF	(Norway) NOR	Sondre Tronstad	41	2	29	1	6	1	6	0
10	MF	(Norway) NOR	Niklas Sandberg	31	10	17+2	6	5+1	2	6	2
11	MF	(Norway) NOR	Martin Samuelsen	39	13	15+13	6	6+1	7	2+2	0
12	GK	(Norway) NOR	Helge Sandvik	39	0	28	0	5	0	6	0
13	MF	(Norway) NOR	Kristoffer Gunnarshaug	3	0	1	0	0+2	0	0	0
14	MF	(Norway) NOR	Torbjørn Kallevåg	28	3	16+5	1	3+2	2	1+1	0
16	MF	(Cape Verde) CPV	Bruno Leite	35	3	20+4	2	5	0	6	1
17	FW	(Senegal) SEN	Ibrahima Wadji	11	5	10	4	1	1	0	0
18	DF	(Denmark) DEN	Pascal Gregor	7	1	3+3	1	0+1	0	0	0
19	MF	(Denmark) DEN	Mikkel Desler	41	1	29	1	6	0	6	0
20	FW	(Mali) MLI	Ibrahima Koné	27	8	7+9	5	1+4	2	5+1	1
22	DF	(Norway) NOR	Alexander Stølås	13	3	11	3	1+1	0	0	0
23	MF	(Norway) NOR	Thore Pedersen	41	1	28+2	0	6+1	1	4	0
25	DF	(Norway) NOR	Stian Ringstad	2	0	2	0	0	0	0	0
33	MF	(Norway) NOR	Kristoffer Velde	38	8	11+15	4	5+1	2	5+1	2
34	MF	(Norway) NOR	Kevin Krygård	31	5	13+5	1	3+4	2	4+2	2
36	FW	(Norway) NOR	Eric Ndayisenga	3	0	0+1	0	0	0	0+2	0
82	GK	(Denmark) DEN	Oskar Snorre	2	0	2	0	0	0	0	0
Players away from Haugesund on loan:
21	FW	(Nigeria) NGR	Shuaibu Ibrahim	2	0	0+1	0	0	0	1	0
35	MF	(Nigeria) NGR	Anthony Ikedi	2	0	0+1	0	0	0	1	0
Players who left Haugesund during the season:

=== Goalscorers ===
Place	Position	Nation	Number	Name	Eliteserien	Norwegian Cup	Europa League	Total
1	MF	(Norway)	11	Martin Samuelsen	6	7	0	13
2	MF	(Norway)	10	Niklas Sandberg	6	2	2	10
3	FW	(Mali)	20	Ibrahima Koné	5	2	1	8
3	MF	(Norway)	33	Kristoffer Velde	4	2	2	8
5	FW	(Senegal)	17	Ibrahima Wadji	4	1	0	5
5	MF	(Norway)	34	Kevin Krygård	1	2	2	5
7	MF	(Norway)	7	Christian Grindheim	3	0	1	4
7				Own goal	3	1	0	4
9	DF	(Norway)	22	Alexander Stølås	3	0	0	3
9	MF	(Cape Verde)	16	Bruno Leite	2	0	1	3
9	MF	(Norway)	14	Torbjørn Kallevåg	1	2	0	3
12	MF	(Norway)	8	Sondre Tronstad	1	1	0	2
13	DF	(Sweden)	2	Doug Bergqvist	1	0	0	1
13	DF	(Norway)	4	Fredrik Knudsen	1	0	0	1
13	DF	(Denmark)	5	Benjamin Hansen	1	0	0	1
13	DF	(Denmark)	18	Pascal Gregor	1	0	0	1
13	MF	(Denmark)	19	Mikkel Desler	1	0	0	1
13	MF	(Norway)	23	Thore Pedersen	0	1	0	1
				TOTALS	44	21	9	74

=== Clean sheets ===
Rank	Pos.	No.	Nat.	Player	Eliteserien	Norwegian Cup	Europa League	Total
1	GK	12	(Norway)	Helge Sandvik	8	3	3	14
TOTALS					8	3	3	14

=== Disciplinary record ===
No.	Pos.	Nat.	Name	Eliteserien		Norwegian Cup		Europa League		Total	
No.	Pos.	Nat.	Name	Yellow card	Red card	Yellow card	Red card	Yellow card	Red card	Yellow card	Red card
2	DF	(Sweden)	Doug Bergqvist	2	0	2	0	1	0	5	0
4	DF	(Norway)	Fredrik Knudsen	1	0	0	0	0	0	1	0
5	DF	(Denmark)	Benjamin Hansen	1	0	2	0	0	0	3	0
7	MF	(Norway)	Christian Grindheim	2	0	0	0	0	0	2	0
8	MF	(Norway)	Sondre Tronstad	5	0	2	0	0	0	7	0
10	MF	(Norway)	Niklas Sandberg	0	0	1	0	1	0	2	0
11	MF	(Norway)	Martin Samuelsen	3	0	2	0	1	0	6	0
14	MF	(Norway)	Torbjørn Kallevåg	4	1	0	0	0	1	4	2
16	MF	(Cape Verde)	Bruno Leite	4	0	2	0	0	0	6	0
17	FW	(Senegal)	Ibrahima Wadji	1	0	0	0	0	0	1	0
19	MF	(Denmark)	Mikkel Desler	5	0	1	0	1	0	7	0
20	FW	(Mali)	Ibrahima Koné	3	0	0	0	2	0	5	0
23	MF	(Norway)	Thore Pedersen	2	0	0	0	0	0	2	0
25	DF	(Norway)	Stian Ringstad	1	0	0	0	0	0	1	0
33	MF	(Norway)	Kristoffer Velde	3	0	2	0	0	0	5	0
34	MF	(Norway)	Kevin Krygård	2	0	1	0	0	0	3	0
Players away from Haugesund on loan:
Players who left Haugesund during the season:
TOTALS				39	1	15	0	6	1	60	2
