= 2022 FK Haugesund season =

Haugesund
2022 season
- Chairman: Leif Helge Kaldheim
- Head coach: Jostein Grindhaug
- Stadium: Haugesund Stadion
- Eliteserien: 10th
- Norwegian Cup: Fourth round
- Top goalscorer: League: Alioune Ndour (9); All: Alioune Ndour (9)
| Home colours | Away colours | Third colours |

The 2022 season was FK Haugesund's 29th season in existence and the club's 13th consecutive season in the top flight of Norwegian football. In addition to the domestic league, FK Haugesund participated in this season's edition of the Norwegian Football Cup.

== Players ==
=== First team squad ===
As of 9 March 2022

Note: Flags indicate national team as defined under FIFA eligibility rules; some limited exceptions apply. Players may hold more than one non-FIFA nationality.

| No. | Pos. | Nation | Player |
|---|---|---|---|
| 1 | GK | NOR | Egil Selvik |
| 3 | DF | NOR | Nikolas Walstad |
| 4 | DF | DEN | Anders Bærtelsen |
| 5 | DF | DEN | Søren Reese |
| 6 | MF | DEN | Magnus Christensen |
| 7 | MF | DEN | Peter Therkildsen |
| 8 | MF | NOR | Kevin Martin Krygård |
| 9 | MF | NOR | Sondre Liseth |
| 10 | MF | NOR | Christos Zafeiris |
| 11 | FW | TUN | Sebastian Tounekti |
| 14 | FW | NOR | Martin Samuelsen |
| 15 | DF | NOR | Ulrik Fredriksen |

| No. | Pos. | Nation | Player |
|---|---|---|---|
| 16 | FW | NOR | Alexander Søderlund |
| 17 | FW | NGR | Hilary Gong |
| 20 | MF | NOR | Torje Naustdal |
| 21 | MF | DEN | Julius Eskesen |
| 23 | DF | NOR | Thore Baardsen Pedersen |
| 26 | MF | CPV | Bruno Leite |
| 27 | MF | NOR | Mads Berg Sande |
| 30 | MF | SEN | Ibrahima Cissokho |
| 32 | GK | NOR | Frank Stople |
| 38 | MF | NOR | Vegard Solheim |
| 99 | FW | NOR | Bilal Njie |

=== Out on loan ===
Note: Flags indicate national team as defined under FIFA eligibility rules; some limited exceptions apply. Players may hold more than one non-FIFA nationality.

| No. | Pos. | Nation | Player |
|---|---|---|---|
| — | FW | NOR | Joacim Holtan (at Start until 31 December 2022) |

== Transfers ==
=== Winter ===
In: Note: Flags indicate national team as defined under FIFA eligibility rules; some limited exceptions apply. Players may hold more than one non-FIFA nationality.

| No. | Pos. | Nation | Player |
|---|---|---|---|
| 3 | DF | NOR | Nikolas Walstad (from Mjøndalen) |
| 5 | DF | DEN | Søren Reese (from (Denmark) Midtjylland) |
| 10 | MF | NOR | Christos Zafeiris (loan return from Grorud) |
| 11 | FW | NOR | Joacim Holtan (from Bryne) |
| 17 | MF | NGR | Hilary Gong (from (Netherlands) Vitesse) |
| 21 | MF | DEN | Julius Eskesen (from (Denmark) SønderjyskE) |
| 30 | MF | SEN | Ibrahima Cissokho (on loan from (Senegal) US Gorée) |
| 32 | GK | NOR | Frank Stople (loan return from Stjørdals-Blink) |
| 36 | DF | NOR | Eivind Helgeland (loan return from Vard) |
| 38 | MF | NOR | Vegard Solheim (promoted from junior squad) |
| 99 | FW | NOR | Bilal Njie (from KFUM) |

Out: Note: Flags indicate national team as defined under FIFA eligibility rules; some limited exceptions apply. Players may hold more than one non-FIFA nationality.

| No. | Pos. | Nation | Player |
|---|---|---|---|
| 1 | GK | NOR | Helge Sandvik (retired) |
| 2 | DF | GAM | Sulayman Bojang (to Skeid) |
| 5 | DF | DEN | Benjamin Tiedemann Hansen (to Molde) |
| 6 | MF | NOR | Joakim Våge Nilsen (to Vard) |
| 10 | MF | NOR | Niklas Sandberg (to Viking) |
| 11 | MF | NOR | Kristoffer Velde (to (Poland) Lech Poznań) |
| 22 | DF | NOR | Alexander Stølås (to Sandnes Ulf) |

=== Summer ===
In: Note: Flags indicate national team as defined under FIFA eligibility rules; some limited exceptions apply. Players may hold more than one non-FIFA nationality.

| No. | Pos. | Nation | Player |
|---|---|---|---|
| 6 | MF | DEN | Magnus Christensen (from (Denmark) AaB) |
| 11 | FW | TUN | Sebastian Tounekti (from Bodø/Glimt) |
| 26 | MF | CPV | Bruno Leite (from (Cyprus) Pafos) |

Out: Note: Flags indicate national team as defined under FIFA eligibility rules; some limited exceptions apply. Players may hold more than one non-FIFA nationality.

| No. | Pos. | Nation | Player |
|---|---|---|---|
| 11 | FW | NOR | Joacim Holtan (on loan to Start) |
| 20 | MF | NOR | Torje Naustdal (on loan to Grorud) |

== Competitions ==
=== Eliteserien ===
==== Results summary ====
| Overall | | | | | | | | Home | | | | | | Away | | | | | |
| Pld | W | D | L | GF | GA | GD | Pts | W | D | L | GF | GA | GD | W | D | L | GF | GA | GD |
|---|---|---|---|---|---|---|---|---|---|---|---|---|---|---|---|---|---|---|---|
| 30 | 10 | 8 | 12 | 42 | 46 | −4 | 38 | 6 | 4 | 5 | 24 | 22 | +2 | 4 | 4 | 7 | 18 | 24 | −6 |

Last updated: 13 November 2022.

==== Results by round ====
| Round | 1 | 2 | 3 | 4 | 5 | 6 | 7 | 8 | 9 | 10 | 11 | 12 | 13 | 14 | 15 | 16 | 17 | 18 | 19 | 20 | 21 | 22 | 23 | 24 | 25 | 26 | 27 | 28 | 29 | 30 |
|---|---|---|---|---|---|---|---|---|---|---|---|---|---|---|---|---|---|---|---|---|---|---|---|---|---|---|---|---|---|---|
| Ground | H | A | H | A | H | A | H | A | H | A | H | A | H | A | H | A | H | A | H | A | H | H | A | H | A | A | H | A | H | A |
| Result | L | L | L | L | W | W | L | D | D | D | W | L | D | L | W | L | W | W | L | L | W | W | D | D | L | W | L | W | D | D |
| Position | 15 | 15 | 16 | 16 | 15 | 12 | 14 | 14 | 14 | 14 | 12 | 13 | 14 | 14 | 14 | 14 | 13 | 9 | 10 | 11 | 10 | 10 | 10 | 10 | 12 | 10 | 12 | 9 | 10 | 10 |

A = Away; H = Home; W = Win; D = Draw; L = Loss

==== Matches ====
| 3 April 2022 1 | Haugesund | 1–3 | Sandefjord | Haugesund |
| 18:00 CEST (UTC+2) | Gong 74' | Report | Ruud Tveter 12', 26', 41' | Stadium: Haugesund Stadion; Attendance: 3,187; Referee: Sivert Øksnes Amland |

| 10 April 2022 2 | Vålerenga | 2–1 | Haugesund | Oslo |
| 18:00 CEST (UTC+2) | Kjartansson 1', 5' | Report | Therkildsen 43' | Stadium: Intility Arena; Attendance: 6,680; Referee: Mohammad Usman Aslam |

| 18 April 2022 3 | Haugesund | 0–1 | Strømsgodset | Haugesund |
| 18:00 CEST (UTC+2) | | Report | Salvesen 81' | Stadium: Haugesund Stadion; Attendance: 3,504; Referee: Kristoffer Hagenes |

| 24 April 2022 4 | Lillestrøm | 1–0 | Haugesund | Lillestrøm |
| 18:00 CEST (UTC+2) | Friðjónsson 87' | Report | | Stadium: Åråsen Stadion; Attendance: 4,902; Referee: Rohit Saggi |

| 30 April 2022 16 | Viking | 5–1 | Haugesund | Stavanger |
| 18:00 CEST | Berisha 26', 41', 50'; Sebulonsen 89', 90+3' | Report | Ndour 20' | Stadium: Viking Stadion; Attendance: 10,571; Referee: Christian Moen |

| 8 May 2022 5 | Haugesund | 2–0 | Kristiansund | Haugesund |
| 18:00 CEST (UTC+2) | Søderlund 2'; Ndour 48' | Report | | Stadium: Haugesund Stadion; Attendance: 3,597; Referee: Marius Lien |

| 16 May 2022 6 | Odd | 0–4 | Haugesund | Skien |
| 18:00 CEST (UTC+2) | | Report | Reese 9'; Sande 17'; Ndour 51'; Søderlund 54' | Stadium: Skagerak Arena; Attendance: 7,164; Referee: Espen Eskås |

| 22 May 2022 7 | Haugesund | 1–4 | Bodø/Glimt | Haugesund |
| 18:00 CEST (UTC+2) | Sande 47' | Report | Sørli 8'; Espejord 31'; Pellegrino 32', 66' | Stadium: Haugesund Stadion; Attendance: 4,514; Referee: Svein Tore Sinnes |

| 26 May 2022 8 | Rosenborg | 3–3 | Haugesund | Trondheim |
| 18:00 CEST (UTC+2) | Vecchia 35'; Pereira 55'; Reese 74' (o.g.) | Report | Søderlund 10' (pen.); Sande 20'; Ndour 40' | Stadium: Lerkendal Stadion; Attendance: 11,076; Referee: Kai Erik Steen |

| 29 May 2022 9 | Haugesund | 2–2 | Aalesund | Haugesund |
| 18:00 CEST (UTC+2) | Therkildsen 31'; Ndour 69' | Report | Määttä 19'; Solnørdal 86' | Stadium: Haugesund Stadion; Attendance: 3,238; Referee: Sivert Øksnes Amland |

| 19 June 2022 10 | Tromsø | 1–1 | Haugesund | Tromsø |
| 18:00 CEST (UTC+2) | Nilsen 89' | Report | Ndour 48' (pen.) | Stadium: Alfheim Stadion; Attendance: 2,636; Referee: Ola Hobber Nilsen |

| 25 June 2022 11 | Haugesund | 4–2 | Viking | Haugesund |
| 16:00 CEST | Ndour 7', 51'; Vevatne 83' (o.g.); Vikstøl 90+1' (o.g.) | Report | Karlsbakk 3'; Friðjónsson 19' (pen.) | Stadium: Haugesund Stadion; Attendance: 5,608; Referee: Rohit Saggi |

| 2 July 2022 12 | Jerv | 1–0 | Haugesund | Grimstad |
| 16:00 CEST | Schröter 90' | Report | | Stadium: J.J. Ugland Stadion – Levermyr; Attendance: 2,090; Referee: Kristoffer Hagenes |

| 10 July 2022 13 | Haugesund | 1–1 | HamKam | Haugesund |
| 20:00 CEST (UTC+2) | Njie 33' | Report | Eriksen 45+3' | Stadium: Haugesund Stadion; Attendance: 3,662; Referee: Tore Hansen |

| 17 July 2022 14 | Molde | 1–0 | Haugesund | Molde |
| 18:00 CEST (UTC+2) | Grødem 56' (pen.) | Report | | Stadium: Aker Stadion; Attendance: 5,377; Referee: Mohammad Usman Aslam |

| 24 July 2022 15 | Haugesund | 3–1 | Sarpsborg 08 | Haugesund |
| 18:00 CEST (UTC+2) | Zafeiris 27'; Sande 45'; Njie 83' | Report | Soltvedt 18' | Stadium: Haugesund Stadion; Attendance: 3,740; Referee: Ola Hobber Nilsen |

| 7 August 2022 17 | Haugesund | 3–1 | Jerv | Haugesund |
| 18:00 CEST (UTC+2) | Njie 3'; Walstad 55'; Samuelsen 90+1' | Report | Schröter 77' | Stadium: Haugesund Stadion; Attendance: 3,264; Referee: Christian Moen |

| 13 August 2022 18 | Aalesund | 1–2 | Haugesund | Ålesund |
| 16:00 CEST (UTC+2) | Barmen 83' | Report | Ndour 81'; Njie 90+1' | Stadium: Color Line Stadion; Attendance: 4,272; Referee: Sivert Øksnes Amland |

| 21 August 2022 19 | Haugesund | 0–1 | Molde | Haugesund |
| 18:00 CEST (UTC+2) | | Report | Linnes 41' | Stadium: Haugesund Stadion; Attendance: 4,159; Referee: Marius Lien |

| 28 August 2022 20 | HamKam | 1–0 | Haugesund | Hamar |
| 18:00 CEST (UTC+2) | Sjølstad 18' | Report | | Stadium: Briskeby Stadion; Attendance: 4,318; Referee: Rohit Saggi |

| 4 September 2022 21 | Haugesund | 2–1 | Tromsø | Haugesund |
| 18:00 CEST (UTC+2) | Søderlund 32'; Sande 79' | Report | Kitolano 19' | Stadium: Haugesund Stadion; Attendance: 3,406; Referee: Mohammad Usman Aslam |

| 11 September 2022 22 | Haugesund | 2–1 | Rosenborg | Haugesund |
| 20:00 CEST (UTC+2) | Zafeiris 29'; Christensen 55' | Report | Dahl Reitan 19' | Stadium: Haugesund Stadion; Attendance: 4,078; Referee: Espen Eskås |

| 18 September 2022 23 | Bodø/Glimt | 1–1 | Haugesund | Bodø |
| 18:00 CEST (UTC+2) | Espejord 48' | Report | Eskesen 58' | Stadium: Aspmyra Stadion; Attendance: 6,348; Referee: Svein Tore Sinnes |

| 2 October 2022 24 | Haugesund | 2–2 | Odd | Haugesund |
| 17:00 CEST (UTC+2) | Sande 45+1'; Njie 46' | Report | Gjengaar 24'; Wallem 82' | Stadium: Haugesund Stadion; Attendance: 4,019; Referee: Kai Erik Steen |

| 8 October 2022 25 | Sarpsborg 08 | 4–0 | Haugesund | Sarpsborg |
| 18:00 CEST (UTC+2) | Torp 9'; Heintz 17', 33'; Skålevik 79' | Report | | Stadium: Sarpsborg Stadion; Attendance: 4,651; Referee: Ola Hobber Nilsen |

| 16 October 2022 26 | Kristiansund | 0–1 | Haugesund | Kristiansund |
| 17:00 CEST (UTC+2) | | Report | Eskesen 12' | Stadium: Kristiansund Stadion; Attendance: 3,578; Referee: Tommy Skjerven |

| 23 October 2022 27 | Haugesund | 0–1 | Lillestrøm | Haugesund |
| 17:00 CEST (UTC+2) | | Report | Lehne Olsen 28' | Stadium: Haugesund Stadion; Attendance: 4,139; Referee: Mohammad Usman Aslam |

| 29 October 2022 28 | Strømsgodset | 1–2 | Haugesund | Drammen |
| 18:00 CEST (UTC+2) | Grøgaard 45+3' | Report | Reese 25'; Njie 49' | Stadium: Marienlyst Stadion; Attendance: 4,742; Referee: Marius Hansen Grøtta |

| 6 November 2022 29 | Haugesund | 1–1 | Vålerenga | Haugesund |
| 17:00 CET (UTC+1) | Leite 88' | Report | Børven 60' | Stadium: Haugesund Stadion; Attendance: 4,418; Referee: Svein Tore Sinnes |

| 13 November 2022 30 | Sandefjord | 2–2 | Haugesund | Sandefjord |
| 17:00 CET (UTC+1) | Singh 89'; Kurtovic 90+1' | Report | Eskesen 20'; Zafeiris 24' | Stadium: Release Arena; Attendance: 4,404; Referee: Tom Harald Hagen |

==== Table ====
| Pos | Team | Pld | W | D | L | GF | GA | GD | Pts |
|---|---|---|---|---|---|---|---|---|---|
| 8 | Sarpsborg 08 | 30 | 12 | 5 | 13 | 57 | 54 | +3 | 41 |
| 9 | Aalesund | 30 | 10 | 9 | 11 | 32 | 45 | −13 | 39 |
| 10 | Haugesund | 30 | 10 | 8 | 12 | 42 | 46 | −4 | 38 |
| 11 | Viking | 30 | 9 | 8 | 13 | 48 | 54 | −6 | 35 |
| 12 | Strømsgodset | 30 | 9 | 6 | 15 | 44 | 55 | −11 | 33 |

Source: Football Association of Norway (in Norwegian)
Rules for classification: 1) Points; 2) Goal difference; 3) Goals scored; 4) Head-to-head points; 5) Head-to-head goal difference; 6) Head-to-head goals scored.

=== Norwegian Football Cup ===
| 19 May 2022 First round | Djerv 1919 | 1–3 | Haugesund | Haugesund |
| 18:00 CEST | Andersen 55' | Report | Therkildsen 18' (pen.); Solheim 37'; Zafeiris 46' | Stadium: Djervbanen; Referee: Jan Morten Tennøy |

| 22 June 2022 Second round | Fana | 0–1 | Haugesund | Bergen |
| 18:00 CEST | | Report | Therkildsen 23' | Stadium: Nesttun Kunstgress; Attendance: 499; Referee: Steinar Hauge |

| 29 June 2022 Third round | Sotra | 0–1 | Haugesund | Straume |
| 18:00 CEST | | Report | Samuelsen 58' | Stadium: Straume Stadion; Attendance: 377; Referee: Jan Morten Tennøy |

Fourth round took place during the 2023 season.
