= 2019 Norwegian Football Cup final =

- Event: 2019 Norwegian Football Cup
Haugesund	Viking
0	1
- Date: 8 December 2019
- Venue: Ullevaal Stadion, Oslo
- Referee: Espen Eskås
- Attendance: 21,895

The 2019 Norwegian Football Cup final was the final match of the 2019 Norwegian Football Cup, the 114th season of the Norwegian Football Cup, the premier Norwegian football cup competition organized by the Norwegian Football Federation (NFF). The match was played on 8 December 2019 at the Ullevaal Stadion in Oslo, and opposed two Eliteserien sides, FK Haugesund and Viking FK. 8 December is the latest time of the year the Norwegian Cup Final has ever been played.

Viking defeated Haugesund 1–0 to claim the Norwegian Cup for the sixth time in their history, the first time since 2001. Viking's captain, Zlatko Tripić, scored the game-winning goal, a penalty after 51 minutes. As a result, Viking qualified for the Europa League second qualifying round.

== Background ==
Haugesund finished the 2019 Eliteserien season in 7th place. Viking, on the other hand, finished the league season in 5th place as a newly promoted side. Haugesund and Viking are both from the county of Rogaland, and this was the first time in ten years that two teams from the same county played in the final. This final was Haugesund's second ever appearance in a Norwegian Cup Final, the last time being in 2007, when they lost against Lillestrøm. Viking last made a cup final appearance in 2001, when they won against another Rogaland club, Bryne. Prior to this year's edition, Viking have made a total of ten appearances in the cup final, winning it on five occasions.

== Route to the final ==
Note: In all results below, the score of the finalist is given first.

Haugesund		Round	Viking	
Åkra (D4); A 4–0	Samuelsen 10', 60', Koné 59', Underhaug 78' (o.g.)	First round	Frøyland (D4); A 3–1	Bytyqi 55', 63', Thorstvedt 70'
Sotra (D2); A 3–1	Wadji 36', Krygård 63', 74'	Second round	Hinna (D4); A 4–1	Friðjónsson 19', 36', Tripić 28', 81'
Bryne (D2); A 6–2	Velde 3', 64', Samuelsen 5', 16', Sandberg 38', Kallevåg 90'	Third round	Sandnes Ulf (D1); A 2–1	Høiland 46', Ibrahimaj 58'
Strømmen (D1); H 2–0 a.e.t.	Koné 112', Samuelsen 116'	Fourth round	Stabæk (ES); H 5–2	Furdal 8', Vikstøl 21', Østensen 23', Thorstvedt 84', Høiland 86'
Mjøndalen (ES); A 3–1	Pedersen 18', Samuelsen 65', Kallevåg 86'	Quarter-final	Aalesund (D1); A 1–1 a.e.t. (5–3 p)	Torsteinbø 40'
Odd (ES); A 3–0	Sandberg 49' (pen.), Samuelsen 83', Tronstad 89'	Semi-final	Ranheim (ES); H 3–0	Thorstvedt 8', Ibrahimaj 38', Källman 52'

Key:

- ES = Eliteserien team
- D1 = 1. divisjon team
- D2 = 2. divisjon team
- D3 = 3. divisjon team
- D4 = 4. divisjon team
- H = Home
- A = Away
- a.e.t. = After extra time
- p = Penalty shoot-out
- o.g. = Own goal
- pen. = Penalty goal

== Match ==
=== Details ===
8 December 2019
13:15 CET (UTC+1)

Haugesund	0–1	Viking
	Report	Tripić 51' (pen.)

Ullevaal Stadion, Oslo
Attendance: 21,895
Referee: Espen Eskås (Bækkelaget)

Haugesund	Viking

Haugesund:
GK	12	(Norway) Helge Sandvik
RB	19	(Denmark) Mikkel Desler	(yellow card) 50'
CB	2	(Sweden) Doug Bergqvist	(yellow card) 43'	(substituted off) 77'
CB	5	(Denmark) Benjamin Hansen	(yellow card) 35'
LB	23	(Norway) Thore Baardsen Pedersen
CM	7	(Norway) Christian Grindheim (c)
DM	8	(Norway) Sondre Tronstad	(yellow card) 90'
CM	16	(Cape Verde) Bruno Leite		(substituted off) 79'
RW	10	(Norway) Niklas Sandberg
CF	11	(Norway) Martin Samuelsen	(yellow card) 72'
LW	33	(Norway) Kristoffer Velde		(substituted off) 90'
Substitutions:
GK	82	(Denmark) Oskar Snorre
MF	13	(Norway) Kristoffer Gunnarshaug
MF	14	(Norway) Torbjørn Kallevåg
DF	18	(Denmark) Pascal Gregor		(substituted on) 77'
FW	20	(Mali) Ibrahima Koné		(substituted on) 90'
DF	25	(Norway) Stian Ringstad
MF	34	(Norway) Kevin Martin Krygård		(substituted on) 79'
Head Coach:
(Norway) Jostein Grindhaug

Viking:
GK	1	(Norway) Iven Austbø
RB	18	(Norway) Sondre Bjørshol
CB	6	(Norway) Runar Hove	(yellow card) 46'
CB	3	(Norway) Viljar Vevatne	(yellow card) 87'
LB	30	(Norway) Adrian Pereira	(yellow card) 25'
CM	28	(Norway) Kristian Thorstvedt
DM	24	(Norway) Kristoffer Løkberg	(yellow card) 61'	(substituted off) 75'
CM	8	(Norway) Johnny Furdal		(substituted off) 67'
RW	20	(Kosovo) Ylldren Ibrahimaj
CF	29	(Finland) Benjamin Källman
LW	11	(Norway) Zlatko Tripić (c)	(yellow card) 55'	(substituted off) 90'
Substitutions:
GK	15	(Norway) Amund Wichne
DF	4	(Norway) Tord Salte
FW	7	(Kosovo) Zymer Bytyqi
MF	9	(Norway) Fredrik Torsteinbø		(substituted on) 67'
FW	10	(Norway) Tommy Høiland
DF	23	(Norway) Rolf Daniel Vikstøl		(substituted on) 90'
MF	27	(Iceland) Samúel Friðjónsson		(substituted on) 75'
Head Coach:
(Norway) Bjarne Berntsen

MATCH OFFICIALS

- Assistant referees:
  - Anders Olav Dale (Nordre Holsnøy IL)
  - Runar Langseth (Kolstad Fotball)
- Fourth official: Rohit Saggi (SBK Drafn)

MATCH RULES

- 90 minutes.
- 30 minutes of extra-time if necessary.
- Penalty shoot-out if scores still level.
- Seven named substitutes.
- Maximum of three substitutions.

== See also ==
- 2019 Norwegian Football Cup
- 2019 Eliteserien
- 2019 in Norwegian football
