= Western Norway derbies =

Sports rivalries in Norway

Western Norway derbies (Norwegian: Vestlandsderby) are association football rivalries within and between cities in Rogaland and Vestland, Western Norway.

Rogaland and Vestland in 2009.

The cities Bergen and Stavanger are the second largest and fourth largest in Norway, respectively. There are also certain rivalries with mid-sized cities in the region, including Haugesund and Bryne.

== Viking and Brann ==
Viking FK and SK Brann nurture the main rivalry of those known as the Western Norway derby. The term Vestlandsderbyet was used in the 1947 Norwegian Football Cup, where Brann faced off in the quarter-final against the eventual cup champions Viking.

At times, there have been physical altercations. One Viking fan was sent to the hospital in 2000. Police arrested 21 brawlers in Stavanger in 2001, most of whom were associated with Brann. In 2019, Viking supporters threw balls, bottles and an Easter egg onto the field to disrupt play in the dying minutes of a 2–1 win over Brann. The Norwegian Football Federation did not penalize Viking for the incident. In 2025, some Viking supporters assembled near the usual marching route of Brann-Bataljonen. Allegedly provoking the marchers by singing Viking songs, they were pelted with stones and other objects.

In 2006, Viking beat Brann 5–0 in the last game of the 2006 Tippeligaen to avoid relegation. In 2024, Brann and Viking drew 1–1 in the last game of the 2024 Eliteserien, which secured Brann a second-place finish and qualification for the UEFA Champions League second qualifying round, two points ahead of Viking.

In 2026, Viking FK women are fighting for promotion to the Toppserien, which could introduce the derby in women's football as well from 2027, since Brann are one of the most competitive Toppserien teams.

== Haugesund ==
With Viking FK and FK Haugesund both being located in Rogaland and frequently competing in Eliteserien, they form a variation on the Western Norway derby called the Rogaland derby. In 2012, Haugesund supporters hung 11 life-size dolls wearing Viking kits from the Risøy bridge as Viking supporters arrived by boat. The two clubs also faced off in the 2019 Norwegian Football Cup final. In 2025, Anders Bærtelsen, who had been named Haugesund captain weeks prior, signed for Viking.

Historically, the rivalry was more sigificant within Haugesund itself, which had three teams of similar stature: SK Haugar, SK Djerv 1919 and SK Vard. Haugar and Djerv 1919 merged to form FK Haugesund in 1993.

The competition between Haugesund and Brann has also been called a Western Norway derby. A controversial transfer happened in 2023 when Mads Berg Sande, originally from Bergen, played for Haugesund but signed a pre-contract with Brann. "I hope they boo me", Sande quipped when playing for Brann against Haugesund later.

== Bryne ==
Stavanger and Bryne are far closer geographically than Bergen or Haugesund. Stereotypically, people from Stavanger have viewed people from Bryne as country bumpkins, whereas Bryne has referred to people from Stavanger as arrogant "byaser", "townies". Among others, Bryne and Viking met in the 2001 Norwegian Football Cup final.

The term Rogaland derby has even been used about competitions between Bryne and teams from Haugesund. It ostensibly arose when two teams from Rogaland met in the Second Division for the first time, those being Bryne and Vard in 1968. At the time, Viking was so far ahead of the other Rogaland teams as to rarely face them in league play, so instead, a southern rim derby against Kristiansand's IK Start was more competitive for several decades. The Viking–Start duels were still viewed as more classic even during the first years when Haugesund and Sandnes Ulf appeared on the first tier.
