= Frank Stople =

Norwegian footballer (born 2002)

Personal information
- Date of birth: 12 February 2002 (age 24)
- Place of birth: Ølen Municipality, Norway
- Height: 1.86 m (6 ft 1 in)
- Position: Goalkeeper

Team information
- Current team: Haugesund
- Number: 32

Youth career
- –2014: Ølen IL
- 2015–2016: IL Skjoldar
- 2017–2018: Haugesund

Senior career*
Years	Team	Apps	(Gls)
2019–2023	Haugesund	3	(0)
2021	→ Stjørdals-Blink (loan)	8	(0)
2023	→ Vard Haugesund (loan)	26	(0)
2024–2025	Strømsgodset	0	(0)
2024	Strømsgodset 2	6	(0)
2025	→ Östersund (loan)	5	(0)
2025–	Haugesund	13	(0)

International career^{‡}
2018	Norway U16	8	(0)
2019	Norway U17	3	(0)
2021	Norway U19	1	(0)
2022	Norway U20	1	(0)
- * Club domestic league appearances and goals as of 14 November 2026 ‡ National team caps and goals as of 7 March 2024

Frank Stople (born 12 February 2002) is a Norwegian footballer who plays as a goalkeeper for Norwegian club Haugesund.

== Career ==
Hailing from Ølen Municipality, he also played youth football for Skjoldar in Vats before moving to Haugesund. He signed with Haugesund's first team in December 2018, still aged only 16. He made his Eliteserien debut in December 2020 against Strømsgodset.

On 14 February 2025, Stople moved on loan to Östersund in Sweden until the end of the year.

== Career statistics ==
As of 14 November 2026

Appearances and goals by club, season and competition
Club	Season	League			National cup		Total	
Club	Season	Division	Apps	Goals	Apps	Goals	Apps	Goals
Haugesund	2020	Eliteserien	2	0	—		2	0
Haugesund	2021	Eliteserien	1	0	1	0	2	0
Haugesund	2022	Eliteserien	0	0	3	0	3	0
Haugesund	Total		3	0	4	0	7	0
Stjørdals-Blink (loan)	2021	1. divisjon	8	0	0	0	8	0
Vard Haugesund (loan)	2023	2. divisjon	26	0	3	0	29	0
Strømsgodset	2024	Eliteserien	0	0	2	0	2	0
Östersund (loan)	2025	Superettan	5	0	0	0	5	0
Haugesund	2026	Norwegian First Division	13	0	1	0	14	0
Career total			55	0	10	0	65	0
