= Thore Pedersen =

Norwegian footballer (born 1996)

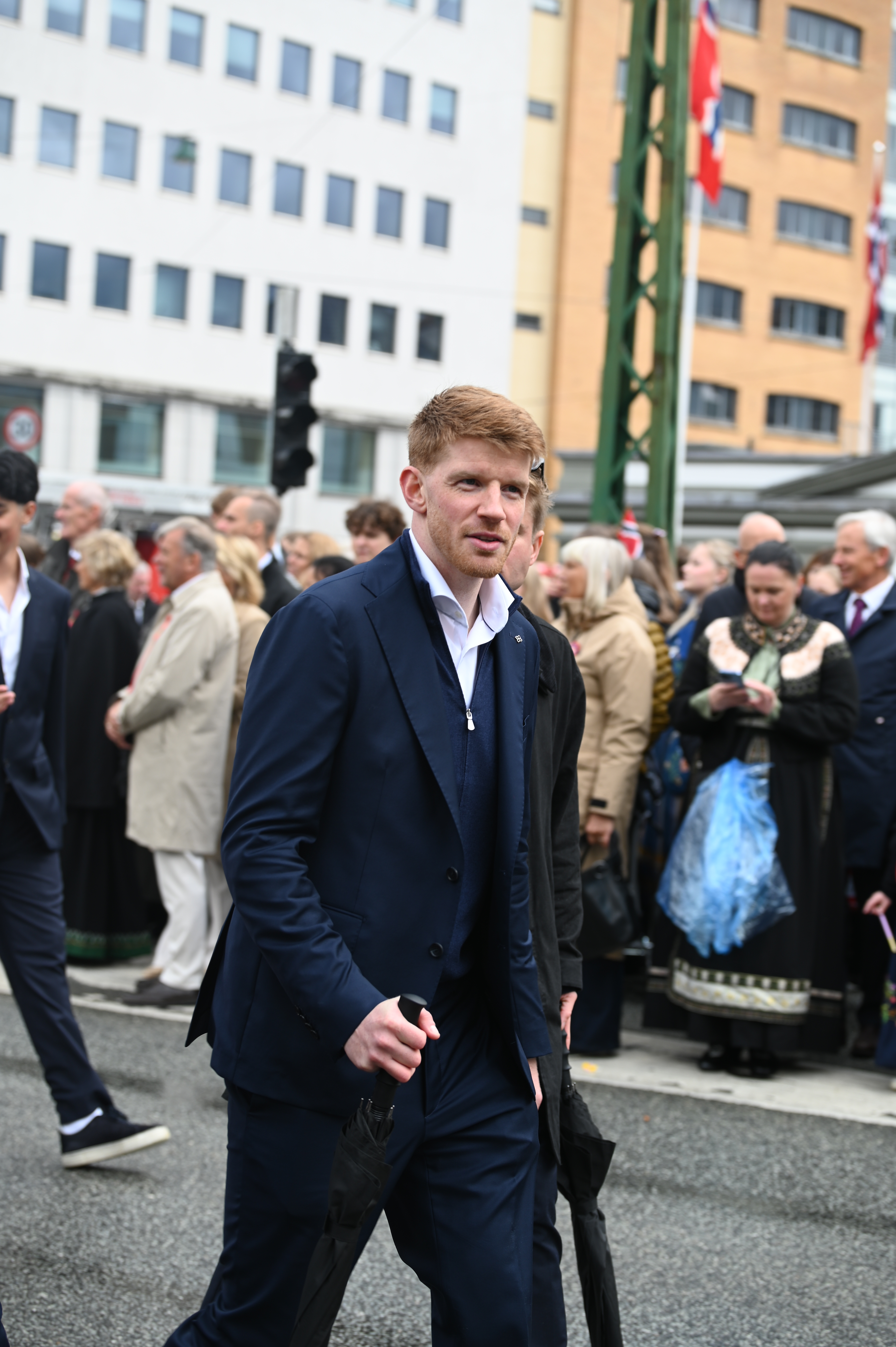

Personal information
- Full name: Thore Baardsen Pedersen
- Date of birth: 11 August 1996 (age 30)
- Position: Right-back

Team information
- Current team: SK Brann
- Number: 23

Youth career
- Vard Haugesund

Senior career*
Years	Team	Apps	(Gls)
2013–2018	Vard Haugesund	123	(0)
2019–2023	Haugesund	107	(0)
2023–	Brann	75	(0)

International career
2014	Norway U18	2	(0)
- * Club domestic league appearances and goals as of 9 October 2026

Thore Baardsen Pedersen (born 11 August 1996) is a Norwegian professional footballer who plays for SK Brann.

== Career statistics ==
As of 15 October 2026

Club	Season	League			National Cup		Other		Total	
Club	Season	Division	Apps	Goals	Apps	Goals	Apps	Goals	Apps	Goals
Vard Haugesund	2013	Adeccoligaen	8	0	0	0	—		8	0
Vard Haugesund	2014	Oddsen-ligaen	22	1	3	0	—		25	1
Vard Haugesund	2015	Oddsen-ligaen	24	3	2	0	—		26	3
Vard Haugesund	2016	PostNord-ligaen	21	2	2	0	—		23	2
Vard Haugesund	2017	PostNord-ligaen	22	2	2	1	—		24	3
Vard Haugesund	2018	PostNord-ligaen	26	1	1	0	—		27	1
Vard Haugesund	Total		123	9	10	1	—		133	10
Haugesund	2019	Eliteserien	30	0	7	1	4 (Note: Appearances in the UEFA Europa League)	0	41	1
Haugesund	2020	Eliteserien	30	0	—		—		30	0
Haugesund	2021	Eliteserien	26	0	1	1	—		27	1
Haugesund	2022	Eliteserien	21	0	2	0	—		23	0
Haugesund	Total		107	0	10	2	4	0	121	2
Brann	2023	Eliteserien	18	0	8	1	4 (Note: Appearances in the UEFA Conference League)	0	30	1
Brann	2024	Eliteserien	12	0	0	0	6	0	18	0
Brann	2025	Eliteserien	25	0	3	1	12 (Note: Two appearances in UEFA Champions League, ten appearances in UEFA Europa League)	0	40	1
Brann	2026	Eliteserien	20	0	6	0	11 (Note: Four appearances in UEFA Europa League, seven appearances in UEFA Conference League)	0	37	0
Brann	Total		75	0	17	2	33	0	125	2
Career total			305	9	37	5	37	0	379	11

== Honours ==
=== Haugesund ===
- Norwegian Football Cup runner-up: 2019

=== Brann ===
- Norwegian Football Cup: 2022-23
