= Andreas Endresen (footballer) =

Norwegian footballer (born 2003)

Personal information
- Date of birth: 21 January 2003 (age 23)
- Position: Forward

Team information
- Current team: Jerv
- Number: 25

Youth career
- –2017: Skudenes
- 2018–2020: Haugesund

Senior career*
Years	Team	Apps	(Gls)
2020–2022	Haugesund	3	(0)
2021–2022	→ Vard Haugesund (loan)	28	(4)
2023	Vard Haugesund	16	(11)
2023–	Jerv	51	(7)

International career^{‡}
2019	Norway U16	5	(0)
2021	Norway U18	1	(0)
- * Club domestic league appearances and goals as of 3 November 2025 ‡ National team caps and goals as of 22 June 2021

Andreas Endresen (born 21 January 2003) is a Norwegian footballer currently playing as a forward for Jerv.

== Career statistics ==
=== Club ===
As of 22 June 2021.

Club	Season	League			Cup		Continental		Other		Total	
Club	Season	Division	Apps	Goals	Apps	Goals	Apps	Goals	Apps	Goals	Apps	Goals
Haugesund	2020	Eliteserien	2	0	–		–		0	0	2	0
Career total			2	0	0	0	0	0	0	0	2	0
