= Christos Zafeiris =

Greek footballer (born 2003)

Personal information
- Date of birth: 23 February 2003 (age 23)
- Place of birth: Athens, Greece
- Height: 1.73 m (5 ft 8 in)
- Position: Central midfielder

Team information
- Current team: PAOK
- Number: 20

Youth career
- –2011: Panathinaikos
- 2013–2014: Fornebu
- 2014: Lillestrøm
- 2015–2016: Fjellhamar
- 2017–2019: Vålerenga

Senior career*
| Years | Team | Apps | (Gls) |
| 2020–2021 | Grorud | 33 | (1) |
| 2021–2023 | Haugesund | 29 | (4) |
| 2021 | → Grorud (loan) | 14 | (1) |
| 2023–2025 | Slavia Prague | 72 | (9) |
| 2025 | Slavia Prague B | 1 | (0) |
| 2025– | PAOK | 22 | (0) |
| 2025 | → Slavia Prague (loan) | 17 | (3) |

International career^{‡}
| 2018 | Norway U15 | 7 | (0) |
| 2019 | Greece U16 | 2 | (0) |
| 2019 | Norway U16 | 8 | (2) |
| 2020 | Norway U17 | 6 | (0) |
| 2021 | Norway U18 | 4 | (0) |
| 2021–2022 | Norway U19 | 6 | (1) |
| 2022–2024 | Norway U21 | 16 | (0) |
| 2024– | Greece | 21 | (0) |
- * Club domestic league appearances and goals as of 20 October 2026 ‡ National team caps and goals as of 4 October 2026

Christos Zafeiris (Greek: Χρήστος Ζαφείρης, born 23 February 2003) is a Greek professional footballer who plays as a central midfielder for Super League club PAOK and the Greece national team.

== Club career ==
Born in Athens, Greece, Zafeiris moved to Norway at the age of nine and started his senior career with Grorud in 2020. In August 2021, he signed a four-and-a-half-year contract with Haugesund. He was simultaneously loaned back to Grorud for the rest of the 2021 season. On 3 April 2022, he made his Eliteserien debut in a 3–1 loss against Sandefjord. On 29 January 2023, Zafeiris signed for Czech First League leaders Slavia Prague on a four-and-a-half-year contract. On 30 June 2025, Zafeiris signed a new contract with Slavia until 2028.

On 20 August 2025, Slavia Prague director Jaroslav Tvrdík confirmed that Zafeiris was bought by PAOK, but until 31 December 2025 he will stay with Slavia Prague on a loan. On 26 August 2025, Zafeiris signed a contract with Super League Greece club PAOK until 31 December 2029.

== International career ==
Zafeiris played for Norway at youth level up ranging from Norway U16 until U21. On 27 August 2024, he switched to play for the Greece national team. The same year on 7 September, Zafeiris debuted in a 3–0 UEFA Nations League victory against Finland.

== Career statistics ==
=== Club ===
As of match played on 22 May 2026

Appearances and goals by club, season and competition
| Club | Season | League | | | National cup (Note: Includes Norwegian Football Cup, Czech Cup) | | Europe | | Total | |
| Club | Season | Division | Apps | Goals | Apps | Goals | Apps | Goals | Apps | Goals |
|---|---|---|---|---|---|---|---|---|---|---|
| Grorud | 2020 | Norwegian First Division | 20 | 0 | 0 | 0 | — | | 20 | 0 |
| Grorud | 2021 | Norwegian First Division | 27 | 2 | 3 | 1 | — | | 30 | 3 |
| Grorud | Total | | 47 | 2 | 3 | 1 | — | | 50 | 3 |
| Haugesund | 2022 | Eliteserien | 29 | 4 | 3 | 1 | — | | 32 | 5 |
| Slavia Prague | 2022–23 | Czech First League | 15 | 1 | 3 | 0 | — | | 18 | 1 |
| Slavia Prague | 2023–24 | Czech First League | 27 | 3 | 1 | 0 | 11 (Note: Appearances in the UEFA Europa League) | 1 | 39 | 4 |
| Slavia Prague | 2024–25 | Czech First League | 30 | 5 | 1 | 0 | 12 (Note: Appearances in the UEFA Champions League) | 1 | 43 | 6 |
| Slavia Prague (loan) | 2025–26 | Czech First League | 17 | 3 | 0 | 0 | 6 | 0 | 23 | 3 |
| Slavia Prague (loan) | Total | | 89 | 12 | 5 | 0 | 29 | 2 | 123 | 14 |
| Slavia Prague B | 2024–25 | Czech National Football League | 1 | 0 | — | | — | | 1 | 0 |
| PAOK | 2025–26 | Super League Greece | 16 | 0 | 4 | 0 | 2 | 0 | 22 | 0 |
| Career total | | | 182 | 17 | 15 | 2 | 31 | 2 | 228 | 21 |

=== International ===
As of match played 1 October 2026

Appearances and goals by national team and year
| National team | Year | Apps | Goals |
|---|---|---|---|
| Greece | 2024 | 5 | 0 |
| Greece | 2025 | 9 | 0 |
| Greece | 2026 | 6 | 0 |
| Total | | 20 | 0 |

== Honours ==
Slavia Prague

- Czech First League: 2024–25
- Czech Cup: 2022–23

Individual

- Eliteserien Young Player of the Month: September 2022
