= Mads Sande =

Norwegian footballer (born 1998)

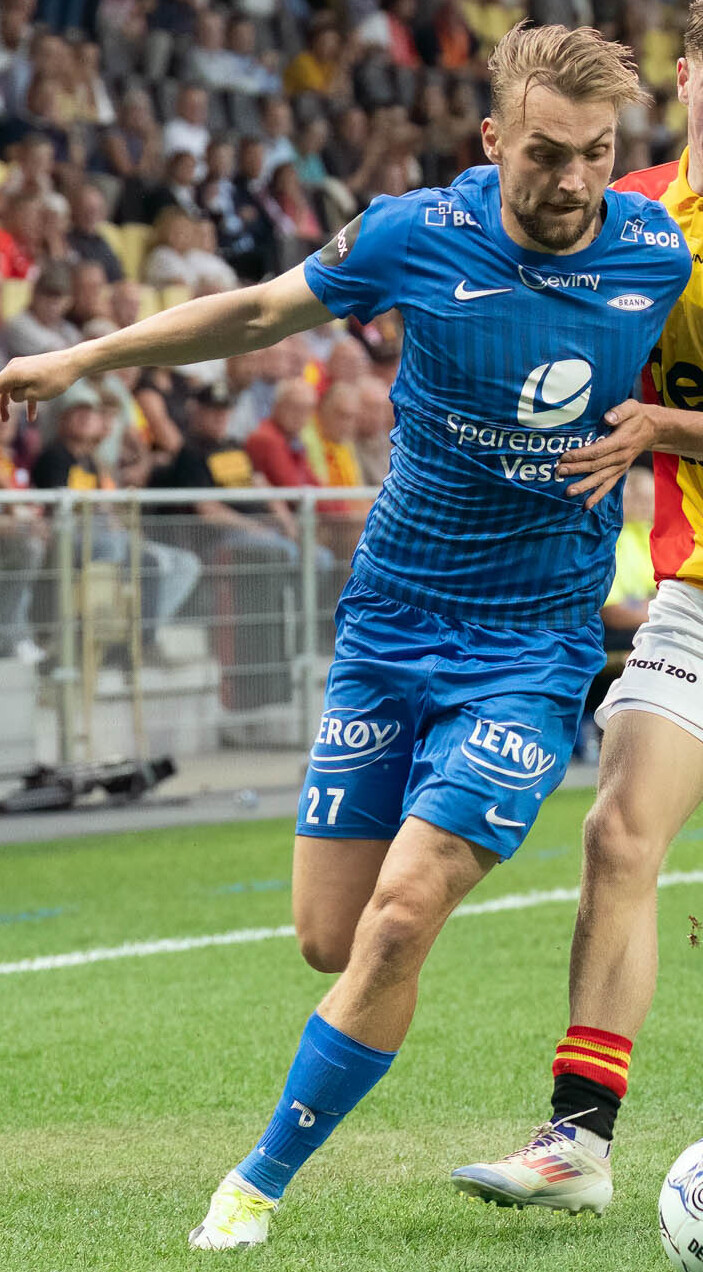
- Sande with Brann in 2024

Personal information
- Full name: Mads Berg Sande
- Date of birth: 22 March 1998 (age 28)
- Height: 1.81 m (5 ft 11 in)
- Position: Attacking midfielder

Team information
- Current team: Kongsvinger
- Number: 27

Youth career
- –2016: Fyllingsdalen

Senior career*
| Years | Team | Apps | (Gls) |
| 2014–2016 | Fyllingsdalen | 49 | (4) |
| 2017–2018 | Fana | 40 | (3) |
| 2018–2019 | Nest-Sotra | 27 | (3) |
| 2020–2023 | Haugesund | 82 | (8) |
| 2020 | → Sandnes Ulf (loan) | 14 | (2) |
| 2023–2026 | Brann | 32 | (4) |
| 2026– | Kongsvinger | 30 | (5) |

International career^{‡}
| 2014 | Norway U16 | 6 | (0) |
| 2015 | Norway U17 | 8 | (0) |
| 2016 | Norway U18 | 4 | (0) |
| 2017 | Norway U19 | 5 | (1) |
- * Club domestic league appearances and goals as of 14 November 2026 ‡ National team caps and goals as of 9 November 2021

Mads Berg Sande (born 22 March 1998) is a Norwegian professional footballer who plays for Kongsvinger.

== Career ==
As his contract with FK Haugesund approached its end as 2023 expired, Sande was allowed to discuss transfers and sign for other clubs in July 2023, and signed for SK Brann. He initially kept the deal secret from FK Haugesund. The news broke as local newspapers reported Sande being at Brann stadion to finalize the deal. The parties decided to push the deal forward to the last day of the summer 2023 transfer window.

In early 2026, Sande signed a one-year contract with Kongsvinger.

== Career statistics ==
As of 7 July 2026

Appearances and goals by club, season and competition
| Club | Season | League | | | Cup | | Europe | | Total | |
| Club | Season | Division | Apps | Goals | Apps | Goals | Apps | Goals | Apps | Goals |
|---|---|---|---|---|---|---|---|---|---|---|
| Fyllingsdalen | 2014 | Norwegian Second Division | 3 | 0 | 0 | 0 | — | | 3 | 0 |
| Fyllingsdalen | 2015 | Norwegian Second Division | 23 | 0 | 2 | 0 | — | | 25 | 0 |
| Fyllingsdalen | 2016 | Norwegian Second Division | 23 | 4 | 1 | 0 | — | | 24 | 4 |
| Fyllingsdalen | Total | | 49 | 4 | 3 | 0 | — | | 52 | 4 |
| Fana | 2017 | Norwegian Second Division | 26 | 1 | 2 | 0 | — | | 28 | 1 |
| Fana | 2018 | Norwegian Third Division | 14 | 2 | 1 | 0 | — | | 15 | 2 |
| Fana | Total | | 40 | 3 | 3 | 0 | — | | 43 | 3 |
| Nest-Sotra | 2018 | Norwegian First Division | 3 | 0 | 0 | 0 | — | | 3 | 0 |
| Nest-Sotra | 2019 | Norwegian First Division | 24 | 3 | 2 | 2 | — | | 26 | 5 |
| Nest-Sotra | Total | | 27 | 3 | 2 | 2 | — | | 29 | 5 |
| Haugesund | 2020 | Eliteserien | 9 | 0 | — | | — | | 9 | 0 |
| Haugesund | 2021 | Eliteserien | 24 | 1 | 1 | 1 | — | | 25 | 2 |
| Haugesund | 2022 | Eliteserien | 29 | 6 | 3 | 0 | — | | 32 | 6 |
| Haugesund | 2023 | Eliteserien | 20 | 1 | 3 | 0 | — | | 23 | 1 |
| Haugesund | Total | | 82 | 8 | 7 | 1 | — | | 89 | 9 |
| Sandnes Ulf (loan) | 2020 | Norwegian First Division | 14 | 2 | — | | — | | 14 | 2 |
| Brann | 2023 | Eliteserien | 1 | 0 | 0 | 0 | — | | 1 | 0 |
| Brann | 2024 | Eliteserien | 10 | 1 | 0 | 0 | 5 (Note: Appearances in UEFA Conference League) | 0 | 15 | 1 |
| Brann | 2025 | Eliteserien | 21 | 3 | 4 | 1 | 4 (Note: One appearance in UEFA Champions League, three appearances in UEFA Europa League) | 0 | 29 | 4 |
| Brann | 2026 | Eliteserien | 0 | 0 | 0 | 0 | 1 (Note: Appearance in UEFA Europa League) | 0 | 1 | 0 |
| Brann | Total | | 32 | 4 | 4 | 1 | 10 | 0 | 46 | 5 |
| Kongsvinger | 2026 | Norwegian First Division | 14 | 3 | 0 | 0 | — | | 14 | 3 |
| Career total | | | 258 | 27 | 19 | 4 | 10 | 0 | 287 | 31 |
