= Oskar Snorre =

Danish footballer (born 1999)

Personal information
- Full name: Oskar Snorre Olsen Frigast
- Date of birth: 26 January 1999 (age 27)
- Place of birth: Vejby, Denmark
- Height: 1.91 m (6 ft 3 in)
- Position: Goalkeeper

Team information
- Current team: Lyngby
- Number: 21

Youth career
- Vejby-Tisvilde Fodbold
- Helsinge Fodbold
- Lyngby

Senior career*
Years	Team	Apps	(Gls)
2017–2020	Lyngby	16	(0)
2019	→ Haugesund (loan)	2	(0)
2020–2023	HB Køge	91	(0)
2023–2025	Randers	0	(0)
2025–	Lyngby	1	(0)

International career
2014–2015	Denmark U16	4	(0)
2015–2016	Denmark U17	10	(0)
2016–2017	Denmark U18	3	(0)
2017–2018	Denmark U19	6	(0)
2018–2019	Denmark U21	2	(0)
- * Club domestic league appearances and goals as of 2 June 2026

Oskar Snorre Olsen Frigast (born 26 January 1999) is a Danish footballer who plays as goalkeeper for Lyngby Boldklub in the Danish Superliga.

== Youth career ==
Snorre joined Lyngby BK at the age of 13. Before joining Lyngby, Snorre played in Vejby-Tisvilde Fodbold and later in a short period for Helsinge Fodbold.

== Career ==
In October 2016, Lyngby BK announced that they had extended the contract of 17-year old Snorre until June 2019. After signing the contract, Snorre became the third choice on the goalkeeper position on the first team squad.

On 18 August 2019, Snorre was loaned out to Norwegian club FK Haugesund for the rest of 2019. Lyngby announced at the same time, that they had extended the players contract until the end of 2020.

On 29 August 2020 it was confirmed, that Snorre had joined Danish 1st Division club HB Køge on a deal until June 2023. After three seasons at Køge, Snorre joined Danish Superliga club Randers FC, signing a deal until June 2026 on 24 May 2023.

On 20 June 2025 Lyngby Boldklub confirmed, that Snorre had returned to the club, after signing a deal until June 2027.

== Career statistics ==
=== Club ===
As of match played 6 October 2024

Club	Season	League			National Cup (Note: Includes Danish Cup, Norwegian Cup)		Continental		Other		Total	
Club	Season	Division	Apps	Goals	Apps	Goals	Apps	Goals	Apps	Goals	Apps	Goals
Lyngby	2017-18	Danish Superliga	12	0	0	0	0	0	2 (Note: Appearance(s) in Danish Superliga Promotion/Relegation play-offs)	0	14	0
Lyngby	2018-19	Danish 1st Division	4	0	0	0	—		0	0	4	0
Lyngby	2019-20	Danish Superliga	0	0	0	0	—		0	0	0	0
Lyngby	2020-21	Danish Superliga	0	0	0	0	—		—		0	0
Lyngby	Total		16	0	0	0	0	0	2	0	18	0
Haugesund (loan)	2019	Eliteserien	2	0	0	0	0	0	—		2	0
HB Køge	2020-21	Danish 1st Division	30	0	0	0	—		—		30	0
HB Køge	2021-22	Danish 1st Division	29	0	0	0	—		—		29	0
HB Køge	2022-23	Danish 1st Division	32	0	1	0	—		—		33	0
HB Køge	Total		91	0	1	0	0	0	0	0	92	0
Randers	2023-24	Danish Superliga	0	0	1	0	—		0	0	1	0
Randers	2024-25	Danish Superliga	0	0	2	0	—		—		2	0
Randers	Total		0	0	3	0	0	0	0	0	3	0
Career total			109	0	4	0	0	0	2	0	115	0

== Honours ==
Lyngby

- Danish 1st Division: 2025–26
