= Pascal Gregor =

Danish footballer (born 1994)

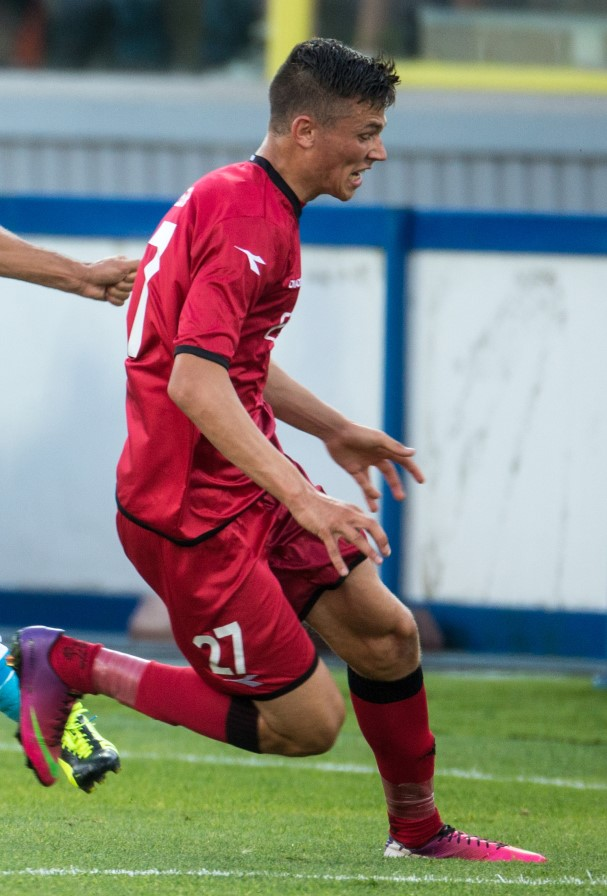

Personal information
- Full name: Pascal Wiberg Gregor
- Date of birth: 18 February 1994 (age 32)
- Place of birth: Copenhagen, Denmark
- Height: 1.89 m (6 ft 2 in)
- Position: Centre-back

Team information
- Current team: Halmstads BK
- Number: 5

Youth career
- –2011: Vanløse
- 2011–2013: Nordsjælland

Senior career*
Years	Team	Apps	(Gls)
2013–2018	Nordsjælland	115	(0)
2018–2019	Helsingør	41	(4)
2019	→ Haugesund (loan)	6	(1)
2019–2025	Lyngby	132	(2)
2025–	Halmstads BK	34	(1)

International career
2013	Denmark U-20	2	(0)
2015–2017	Denmark U-21	13	(0)
2016	Denmark Olympic	4	(0)
- * Club domestic league appearances and goals as of 9 July 2026

Pascal Wiberg Gregor (Danish pronunciation: [ˈkʁekɒˀ]; born 18 February 1994) is a Danish professional footballer who plays as a centre-back for Allsvenskan club Halmstads BK.

== Career ==
=== Nordsjælland ===
A centre-back, Gregor joined the FC Nordsjælland academy in 2011 from Vanløse IF. In 2013, he captained their under-19 side, winning gold in the under-19 league. Gregor was also announced as Talent of the Year in FC Nordsjælland in 2013. The same year, he was promoted to the first-team in order to replace Jores Okore who had signed with Aston Villa. In December 2013, his good performances were rewarded with a four-year contract extension.

Upon his contract expiring, Gregor refused to sign a contract extension, making him a free agent in January 2018.

=== Helsingør ===
On 4 January 2018, Gregor signed a two-year contract with FC Helsingør. He made his debut for the club on 11 February as a starter in a 6–1 away loss to OB. Gregor made 45 total appearances for Helsingør in which he scored four goals.

==== Loan to Haugesund ====
On 2 August 2019, Gregor joined Norwegian club FK Haugesund on loan for the remainder of 2019. He made his debut for the club on 4 August, coming on as a first-half substitute for the injured Fredrik Pallesen Knudsen in a 1–1 away draw against Stabæk. Gregor scored his first goal for Haugesund on 20 October, scoring on a header in a 3–1 loss to Molde. He ended his tenure with the Norwegian club with one goal in seven appearances, as he struggled to break into the team.

=== Lyngby ===
On 19 December 2019, Lyngby Boldklub confirmed that Gregor would join the club January 2020 on a three-year contract. Upon his return to Denmark, he made his first appearance for the club on 17 February 2020, as a starter in a 2–0 away loss to FC Midtjylland. He suffered relegation to the Danish 1st Division with the club on 9 May 2021 after a loss to last placed AC Horsens.

Gregor scored his first goal for the club on 18 March 2022, heading in a cross from Magnus Kaastrup to secure a final 3–0 score in the away match against Esbjerg fB in the 1st Division.

=== Halmstads BK ===
On 22 January 2025, it was confirmed that Gregor moved to Swedish side Halmstads BK on a deal until the end of 2027.

== Career statistics ==
As of 24 August 2021

Appearances and goals by club, season and competition
Club	Season	League			Cup		Europe		Other		Total	
Club	Season	Division	Apps	Goals	Apps	Goals	Apps	Goals	Apps	Goals	Apps	Goals
Nordsjælland	2012–13	Superliga	5	0	0	0	—		—		5	0
Nordsjælland	2013–14	Superliga	31	0	5	0	1 (Note: Appearance(s) in the UEFA Europa League)	0	—		37	0
Nordsjælland	2014–15	Superliga	32	0	0	0	—		—		32	0
Nordsjælland	2015–16	Superliga	29	0	0	0	—		—		29	0
Nordsjælland	2016–17	Superliga	18	0	1	0	—		—		19	0
Nordsjælland	Total		115	0	6	0	1	0	—		122	0
Helsingør	2017–18	Superliga	10	0	0	0	—		4 (Note: Appearances in the Superliga relegation play-offs)	0	14	0
Helsingør	2018–19	1st Division	31	4	1	0	—		—		32	4
Helsingør	Total		41	4	1	0	0	0	4	0	46	4
Haugesund	2019	Eliteserien	6	1	1	0	0	0	—		7	1
Lyngby	2019–20	Superliga	12	0	0	0	—		2	0	14	0
Lyngby	2020–21	Superliga	12	0	3	1	—		0	0	15	1
Lyngby	2021–22	1st Division	6	0	0	0	—		—		6	0
Lyngby	Total		28	0	3	1	—		2	0	33	1
Career total			190	5	11	1	1	0	6	0	208	6
