= Alexander Stølås =

Norwegian footballer (born 1989)

Personal information
- Full name: Alexander Stølås
- Date of birth: 30 April 1989 (age 37)
- Place of birth: Haugesund, Norway
- Height: 1.84 m (6 ft 1/2 in)
- Positions: Left back; left wing

Team information
- Current team: Sandnes Ulf
- Number: 11

Youth career
- -2006: Kopervik Idrettslag
- 2006-2009: Avaldsnes IL
- 2009-2010: FK Haugesund

Senior career*
Years	Team	Apps	(Gls)
2009-2010	FK Haugesund	6	(0)
2011–2013	Vard Haugesund	76	(21)
2014–2022	FK Haugesund	183	(19)
2022–	Sandnes Ulf	32	(1)
2023	→ Aalesund (loan)	3	(0)
- * Club domestic league appearances and goals as of 18 November 2023

Alexander Stølås (born 30 April 1989) is a Norwegian professional footballer who plays as a left-back for Sandnes Ulf.

== Club career ==
Stølås was born 30 April 1989 in Haugesund. Initially he started his football career at junior level in Kopervik Idrettslag in 2004, but switched to Avaldsnes IL in 2006. He first joined FK Haugesund in 2009 but eventually failed to become a regular for the senior team, only playing 6 matches in the season FK Haugesund achieved promotion from the first division to Eliteserien. As a consequence of the lack of appearances, he joined Vard Haugesund in 2011 and gradually became locally renowned for his work-rate, technical abilities and incredible shooting power. From 2011 to 2013 he scored a total of 21 goals in 76 league appearances for the second division side, primarily from a left-back and left-wing position. He rapidly gained interest from a number of clubs in the Norwegian first division, as well as his local and former Eliteserien club FK Haugesund.

In 2014 he once again joined FK Haugesund and made his senior debut in Eliteserien on 29 March 2014 in a 1–1 draw against Lillestrøm. Having become physically stronger, it soon became apparent that he had improved immensely compared to his first period at FK Haugesund. In his first season in the Eliteserien he became one of the top scorers at the club, scoring a total of 10 goals in 33 league appearances.

His shooting abilities in particular gained nationwide attraction when he scored from over 35 metres at a set piece against top-club Molde FK on 23 May 2014. This goal was awarded Goal of the Season in Eliteserien for 2014 and also gained traction internationally.

From 2014 and onwards, Stølås rapidly became a regular at FK Haugesund and gradually one of the club's key players. On 5 November 2018, Stølås renewed his contract with FK Haugesund binding him to the club until the end of 2022. He renewed his contract despite being linked to a number of top-clubs in Eliteserien and Scandinavia, as well as the 2. Bundesliga club Union Berlin in Germany. He has also been involved in the discussion for the left-back position at the Norway national football team.

== Personal life ==
Alexander Stølås' Alma mater is the Western Norway University of Applied Sciences campus Haugesund, where he holds a Bachelor of Engineering (BEng) degree in Mechanical, process and energy technology, achieved in 2017. His bachelor's thesis was titled Optimizing the cleaning process of plate heat exchangers (Norwegian: Optimalisere rengjøringsprosess av platevarmevekslere).

== Career statistics ==
As of 29 August 2021

Season	Club	Division	League		Cup		Total	
Season	Club	Division	Apps	Goals	Apps	Goals	Apps	Goals
Vard Haugesund	2011	2. divisjon	26	11	0	0	26	11
Vard Haugesund	2012	2. divisjon	24	6	2	0	26	6
Vard Haugesund	2013	1. divisjon	26	4	3	0	29	4
Vard Haugesund	Total		76	21	5	0	81	21
Haugesund	2014	Tippeligaen	28	4	5	6	33	10
Haugesund	2015	Tippeligaen	20	1	1	0	21	1
Haugesund	2016	Tippeligaen	28	5	3	0	31	5
Haugesund	2017	Eliteserien	30	1	4	0	34	1
Haugesund	2018	Eliteserien	29	4	5	0	34	4
Haugesund	2019	Eliteserien	11	3	2	0	13	3
Haugesund	2020	Eliteserien	23	0	0	0	23	0
Haugesund	2021	Eliteserien	14	1	1	0	15	1
Haugesund	Total		183	19	21	6	204	25
Career Total			259	40	26	6	285	46
