= Peter Therkildsen =

Danish footballer (born 1998)

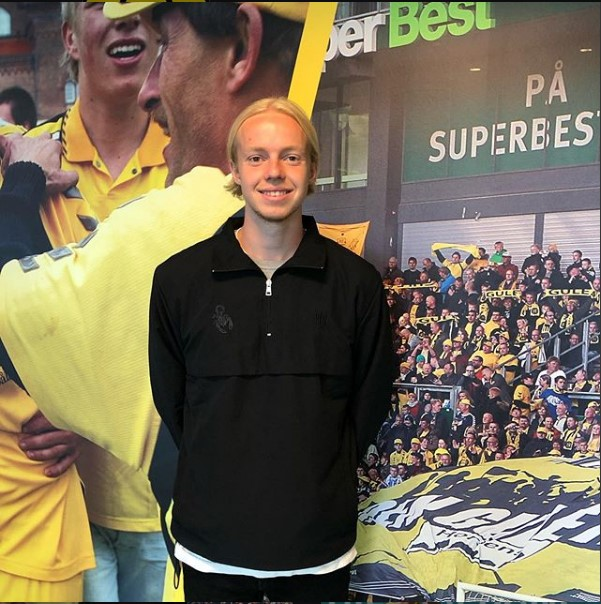
- Therkildsen in 2019

Personal information
- Full name: Peter Nysted Therkildsen
- Date of birth: 13 June 1998 (age 28)
- Place of birth: Denmark
- Height: 1.90 m (6 ft 3 in)
- Position: Defender

Team information
- Current team: OB

Senior career*
Years	Team	Apps	(Gls)
2015–2018	HB Køge	0	(0)
2018–2019	Næstved BK	48	(0)
2019–2021	AC Horsens	30	(3)
2020	→ Haugesund (loan)	8	(2)
2021–2024	Haugesund	88	(7)
2024–2025	Djurgårdens IF	13	(0)
2025	→ Widzew Łódź (loan)	11	(0)
2025–2026	Widzew Łódź	8	(1)
2026–	OB	0	(0)
- * Club domestic league appearances and goals as of 13:34, 3 March 2026 (UTC)

Peter Nysted Therkildsen (born 13 June 1998) is a Danish professional footballer who plays as a defender for Danish Superliga club OB.

== Honours ==
Individual

- Eliteserien Player of the Month: October 2023
