= Martin Samuelsen =

Norwegian footballer (born 1997)

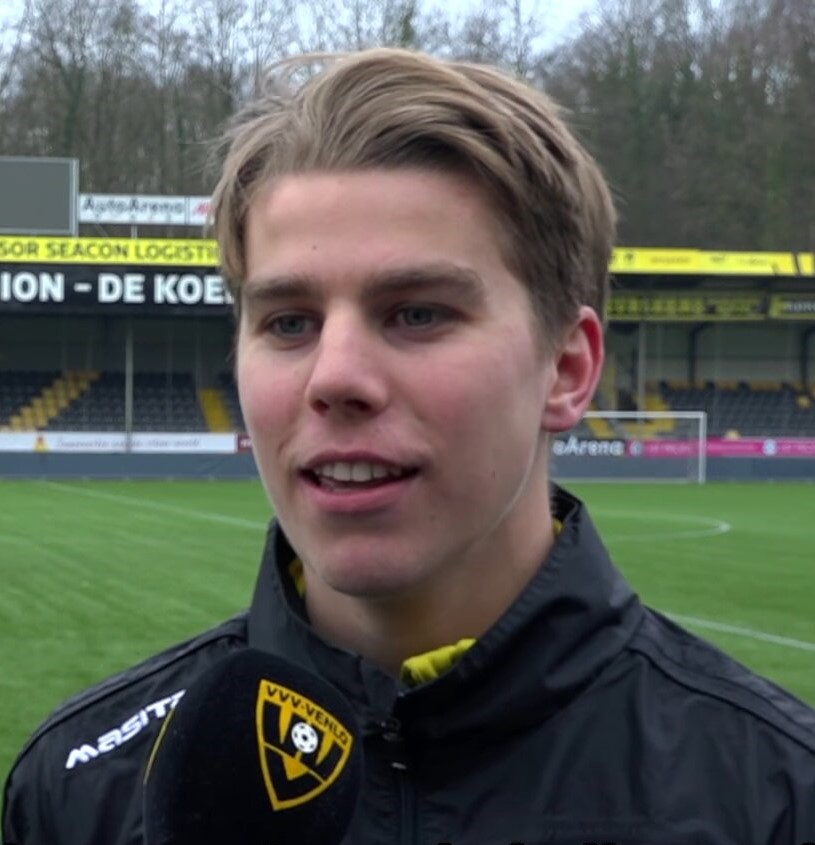
- Samuelsen in 2019

Personal information
- Full name: Martin Samuelsen
- Date of birth: 17 April 1997 (age 29)
- Place of birth: Haugesund, Norway
- Height: 1.89 m (6 ft 2 in)
- Positions: Attacking midfielder; winger

Team information
- Current team: FK Haugesund
- Number: 14

Youth career
- 2011–2012: Vard Haugesund
- 2012–2015: Manchester City
- 2015: West Ham United

Senior career*
Years	Team	Apps	(Gls)
2015–2020	West Ham United	0	(0)
2015–2016	→ Peterborough United (loan)	17	(1)
2016	→ Blackburn Rovers (loan)	3	(0)
2017	→ Peterborough United (loan)	11	(1)
2018	→ Burton Albion (loan)	9	(0)
2018–2019	→ VVV-Venlo (loan)	10	(0)
2019	→ FK Haugesund (loan)	28	(6)
2020–2021	Hull City	12	(0)
2021	→ AaB (loan)	12	(0)
2021–	FK Haugesund	62	(6)

International career^{‡}
2013	Norway U16	10	(0)
2014	Norway U17	11	(1)
2015	Norway U18	7	(3)
2016–2018	Norway U21	8	(0)
2016–2018	Norway	3	(1)
- * Club domestic league appearances and goals as of 1 December 2025 ‡ National team caps and goals as of 19:44, 16 October 2018 (UTC)

Martin Samuelsen (born 17 April 1997) is a Norwegian professional footballer who plays for FK Haugesund. After long spells at the academies of Vard Haugesund and Manchester City and short trials at big clubs across Europe, Samuelsen signed for West Ham in June 2015. Samuelsen, a versatile player, can play both central and wide midfield positions as well as a forward. He went on loan at Peterborough United for the majority of the 2015–16 season.

Samuelsen has represented his country at youth level, earning caps at under-16, under-17, under-18 and under-21 levels. In June 2016, he made his debut for the Norway senior team.

== Youth career ==
Having just turned 14, Samuelsen was playing for Vard Haugesund at youth level when he reportedly attracted interest from clubs such as Real Madrid and Chelsea. A year later, he joined Manchester City where he spent three years at their academy, playing regular football for their Elite Development Squad.

== Professional career ==
=== West Ham United ===
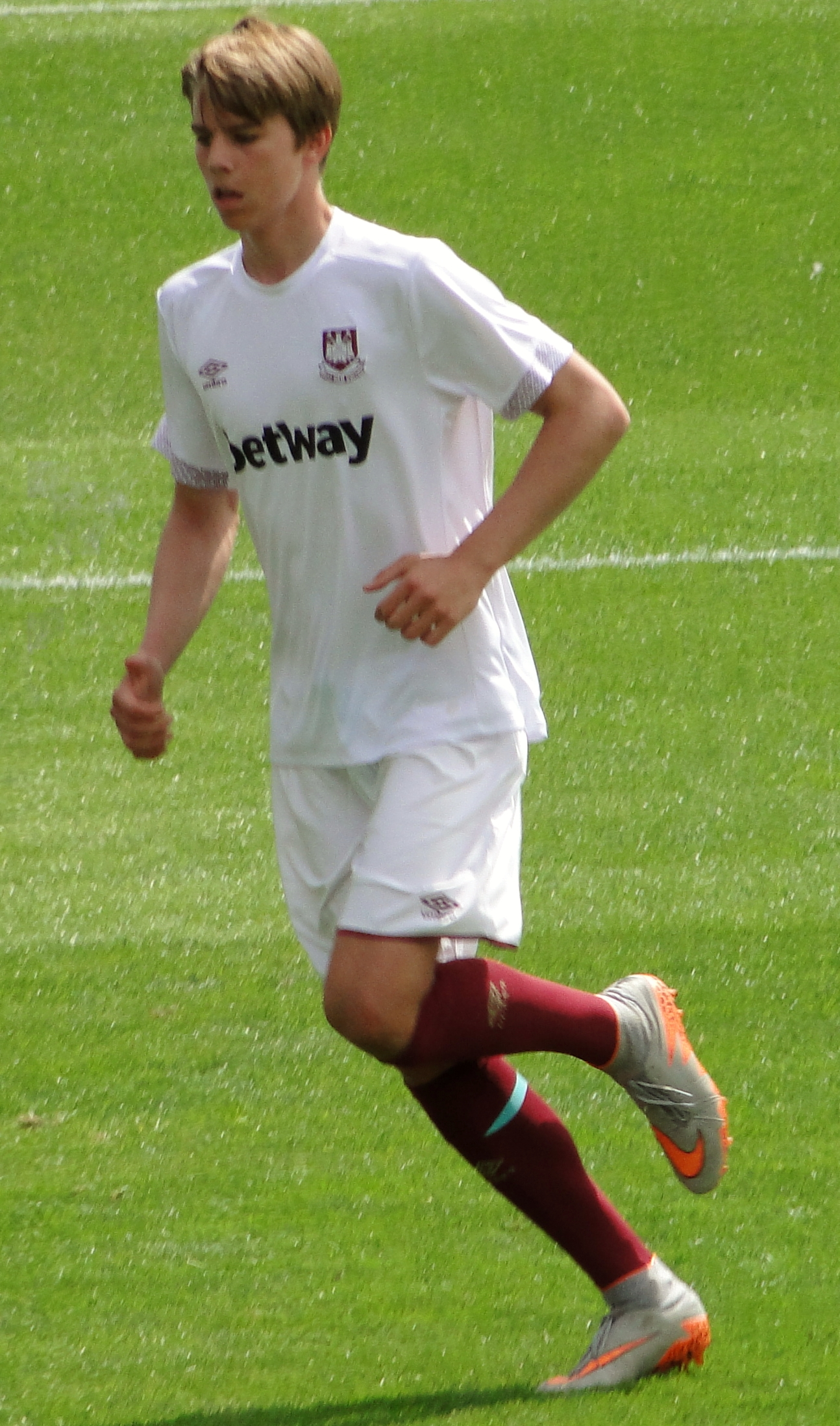
Samuelsen warming up for West Ham United in 2015

After the transfer to West Ham United was announced on 20 June 2015, Samuelsen scored on his debut in a friendly at Peterborough United three weeks later. He made his professional debut for the club five days later at the Boleyn Ground in a Europa League second qualifying round match against Birkirkara, replacing Morgan Amalfitano after 59 minutes. In August 2016, Samuelsen signed a new contract to the East London club until June 2020.

==== Peterborough United (loan) ====
On 24 November 2015, Peterborough United announced the signing of Samuelsen on a one-month loan deal until 2 January. Samuelsen scored his first goal for Peterborough on 2 January 2016 in a 3–2 away win against Sheffield United. With the game at 2–2, he received the ball near the touch-line before weaving past several defenders and shooting past Sheffield goalkeeper George Long. The manner of the goal drew comparisons with the playing style of Lionel Messi. In January his loan was extended until the end of the 2015–16 season. Samuelsen returned to West Ham on 22 April 2016 to compete in the U21 Premier League Cup final which West Ham won over two legs.

==== Blackburn Rovers (loan) ====
On 25 August 2016, Samuelsen joined Blackburn Rovers on a season-long loan. On 22 November 2016, Samuelsen's loan at the club was cut short after a lack of playing time.

==== Peterborough United (loan) ====
On 1 January 2017, Samuelsen returned to Peterborough United on loan until the end of the 2016–17 season.

==== Burton Albion (loan) ====
On 17 January 2018, Samuelsen joined Burton Albion on loan until the end of the 2017–18 season.

==== VVV-Venlo (loan) ====
In August 2018, Samuelsen joined VVV-Venlo in a season-long loan deal.

==== FK Haugesund (loan) ====
On 20 February 2019, Samuelsen joined Haugesund in a loan deal until the end of the English league season, and this was extended until the end of the Norwegen Eliteserien on 25 June. He was given his debut on 31 March, replacing Bruno Leite for the final 14 minutes of a 3-2 league defeat to Strømsgodset. His first goal for the club was the opening goal in a 2–0 win at Ranheim on 14 April. On 18 July he scored his first goal in the Europa League as Haugesund beat Cliftonville 5–1.

=== Hull City ===
He signed on a two-and-a-half-year deal for Championship club Hull City on 16 January 2020 for an undisclosed fee. He made his debut on 18 January 2020, when he came off the bench as a 62nd-minute substitute for Josh Bowler in the 1–0 defeat away to Derby County. On 17 November 2020, he scored a brace in the 3–0 win against Grimsby Town in the final group match of the EFL Trophy. On 1 February 2021, he joined Danish Superliga side AaB on loan until the end of the season, with an option to make the deal permanent.

=== FK Haugesund ===
On 1 July 2021, Samuelsen signed a permanent deal with Norwegian side FK Haugesund for an undisclosed fee.

== International career ==
Samuelsen has represented Norway's youth teams on numerous occasions throughout his youth career. On 25 March 2016, aged 18, Samuelsen made his debut for Norway U21s against Netherlands Under 21s in a 1–0 win. Three days later, he played again for the U21s this time against Spain Under 21s in a 1–0 defeat.

Following Norway's failure to qualify for Euro 2016, Samuelsen was picked for the Norway national team aged 19. He made his debut by coming off the bench in the 53rd minute replacing Pål André Helland in a 3–2 win over Iceland. Samuelsen won the free-kick that led to Norway's third goal just after coming on. Samuelsen scored his first goal for the national team in a 4–1 win against San Marino.

== Career statistics ==
As of 6 June 2025.

Club	Season	League	Apps	Goals	Apps	Goals	Apps	Goals	Apps	Goals	Apps	Goals
			League		FA Cup		League Cup		Other		Total	
West Ham United	2015–16	Premier League	0	0	0	0	0	0	2 (Note: Appearances in UEFA Europa League)	0	2	0
West Ham United	2016-17	Premier League	0	0	0	0	0	0	0	0	0	0
West Ham United	2017-18	Premier League	0	0	0	0	0	0	4 (Note: Appearances in the EFL Trophy)	2	4	2
Total			0	0	0	0	0	0	6	2	6	2
Peterborough United (loan)	2015–16	League One	17	1	3	1	0	0	—		20	2
Peterborough United (loan)	2016–17	League One	10	1	1	0	0	0	—		11	1
Peterborough United (loan)	Total		27	2	4	1	0	0	0	0	31	3
Blackburn Rovers (loan)	2016–17	Championship	3	0	0	0	1	0	—		4	0
Burton Albion (loan)	2017–18	Championship	9	0	0	0	0	0	—		9	0
VVV Venlo (loan)	2018–19	Eredivisie	10	0	2	2	—		—		12	2
Haugesund (loan)	2019	Eliteserien	28	6	7	7	—		4	1	39	14
Hull City	2019–20	Championship	7	0	1	0	0	0	—		8	0
Hull City	2020–21	League One	5	0	1	0	1	0	3	2	10	2
Hull City	Total		12	0	2	0	1	0	3	2	18	2
AaB (loan)	2020–21	Danish Superliga	13	0	0	0	0	0	1 (Note: Appearances in Superliga European play-offs)	0	14	0
Haugesund	2021	Eliteserien	16	2	0	0	0	0	—		16	2
Haugesund	2022	Eliteserien	18	1	3	1	0	0	—		21	2
Haugesund	2023	Eliteserien	15	2	2	0	0	0	—		17	2
Haugesund	2024	Eliteserien	7	1	1	0	0	0	—		8	1
Haugesund	2025	Eliteserien	6	0	3	2	0	0	—		9	2
Haugesund	Total		62	6	9	3	0	0	0	0	71	9
Career total			164	14	24	13	2	0	14	5	204	22

=== International goals ===
Scores and results list Norway's goal tally first.

No	Date	Venue	Opponent	Score	Result	Competition
1.	11 October 2016	Ullevaal Stadion, Oslo, Norway	San Marino	3–1	4–1	2018 FIFA World Cup qualification

== Honours ==
=== Individual ===
- Norwegian Cup Top goalscorer: 2019
