= Bruno Leite =

Portuguese/Cape Verdean footballer (born 1995)

Personal information
- Full name: Bruno Miguel Santos Leite
- Date of birth: 26 March 1995 (age 31)
- Place of birth: Lisbon, Portugal
- Height: 1.84 m (6 ft 1/2 in)
- Position: Midfielder

Team information
- Current team: Haugesund
- Number: 16

Youth career
- Skeid

Senior career*
Years	Team	Apps	(Gls)
2012–2016	Skeid	82	(16)
2016–2021	Haugesund	104	(3)
2021–2022	Pafos	2	(0)
2022–	Haugesund	104	(10)

International career^{‡}
2018–	Cape Verde	6	(0)
- * Club domestic league appearances and goals as of 14 November 2026 ‡ National team caps and goals as of 5 May 2023

Bruno Miguel Santos Leite (born 26 March 1995) is a Cape Verdean footballer who plays as a midfielder for Haugesund. Born in Portugal, Leite represents the Cape Verde national football team internationally. He also holds Norwegian citizenship.

== Club career ==
On 28 November 2016, Leite signed a three-and-a-half-year contract with FK Haugesund.

== International career ==
Graça made his international debut for the Cape Verde national football team in a 3-0 2019 Africa Cup of Nations qualification win over Tanzania on 12 October 2018.

== Career statistics ==
=== Club ===
As of 7 July 2026

Appearances and goals by club, season and competition
Club	Season	League			National Cup (Note: Including Norwegian Cup, Cypriot Cup)		Europe		Total	
Club	Season	Division	Apps	Goals	Apps	Goals	Apps	Goals	Apps	Goals
Skeid	2012	2. divisjon	7	1	0	0	–		7	1
Skeid	2013	3. divisjon	19	4	1	0	–		20	4
Skeid	2014	2. divisjon	18	3	0	0	–		18	3
Skeid	2015	2. divisjon	18	4	0	0	–		18	4
Skeid	2016	2. divisjon	20	4	0	0	–		20	4
Skeid	Total		82	16	1	0	–		83	16
Haugesund	2017	Eliteserien	23	0	3	0	3 (Note: Appearances in UEFA Europa League)	0	29	0
Haugesund	2018	Eliteserien	24	1	2	0	–		26	1
Haugesund	2019	Eliteserien	24	2	5	0	6	1	35	3
Haugesund	2020	Eliteserien	23	0	–		–		23	0
Haugesund	2021	Eliteserien	10	0	1	0	–		11	0
Haugesund	Total		104	3	11	0	9	1	124	4
Pafos	2021–22	Cypriot First Division	2	0	2	0	–		4	0
Haugesund	2022	Eliteserien	8	1	0	0	–		8	1
Haugesund	2023	Eliteserien	23	2	3	0	–		26	2
Haugesund	2024	Eliteserien	27	3	1	0	–		28	3
Haugesund	2025	Eliteserien	21	0	2	0	–		23	0
Haugesund	2026	Norwegian First Division	10	1	0	0	–		10	1
Haugesund	Total		89	7	6	0	–		95	7
Career total			277	26	20	0	9	1	306	27
