= Torje Naustdal =

Norwegian footballer (born 2000)

Personal information
- Date of birth: 26 April 2000 (age 26)
- Height: 1.78 m (5 ft 10 in)
- Position: Midfielder

Team information
- Current team: Hønefoss /(on loan from Raufoss)
- Number: 17

Youth career
- –2017: Florø

Senior career*
Years	Team	Apps	(Gls)
2017–2019	Florø	42	(0)
2020–2021	Strømmen	41	(2)
2021–2022	Haugesund	22	(0)
2022	→ Grorud (loan)	9	(1)
2023–2025	Skeid	71	(0)
2026–	Raufoss	9	(0)
2026–	→ Hønefoss (loan)	14	(1)

International career^{‡}
2018	Norway U18	5	(0)
2019	Norway U19	1	(0)
- * Club domestic league appearances and goals as of 15 November 2026 ‡ National team caps and goals as of 8 August 2021

Torje Naustdal (born 26 April 2000) is a Norwegian football midfielder who plays for Hønefoss, on loan from Raufoss.

== Career ==
A youth product of Florø SK, he made his senior debut in the 2017 1. divisjon. After Florø later became relegated, Naustdal was picked up by Strømmen IF and then FK Haugesund. He made his Eliteserien debut in August 2021 against Molde.

In December 2025, he joined Raufoss on a two-year deal.
