= Kristoffer Gunnarshaug =

Norwegian footballer (born 1999)

Personal information
- Date of birth: 11 May 1999 (age 27)
- Position: Midfielder

Team information
- Current team: Ullensaker/Kisa
- Number: 17

Youth career
- –2015: Haugar
- 2015–2018: Haugesund

Senior career*
Years	Team	Apps	(Gls)
2014–2015	Haugar		
2018	Lysekloster	12	(3)
2019–2021	Haugesund	15	(0)
2021–	Ullensaker/Kisa	0	(0)
- * Club domestic league appearances and goals as of 3 August 2021

Kristoffer Gunnarshaug (born 11 May 1999) is a Norwegian football midfielder who plays for Ullensaker/Kisa.
