= Kristoffer Velde =

Norwegian footballer (born 1999)

- Velde with the Portland Timbers in 2026

Personal information
- Date of birth: 9 September 1999 (age 27)
- Place of birth: Haugesund, Norway
- Height: 1.79 m (5 ft 10 in)
- Position: Winger

Team information
- Current team: Portland Timbers
- Number: 99

Youth career
- –2012: Kopervik
- 2013: Vard
- 2014: Kopervik
- 2015–2017: Haugesund

Senior career*
Years	Team	Apps	(Gls)
2017–2021	Haugesund	101	(21)
2019	→ Nest-Sotra (loan)	0	(0)
2022–2024	Lech Poznań	72	(18)
2024–2025	Olympiacos	21	(4)
2025–	Portland Timbers	45	(14)

International career^{‡}
2017	Norway U19	2	(1)
2023	Norway	1	(0)
- * Club domestic league appearances and goals as of 18:10, 8 November 2026 (UTC) ‡ National team caps and goals as of 20:51, 20 June 2023 (UTC)

Kristoffer Velde (born 9 September 1999) is a Norwegian professional footballer who plays as a winger for Major League Soccer club Portland Timbers and the Norway national team.

== Early life ==
Velde was born in Haugesund, Norway to a Norwegian father and an Argentinian mother, who met while working on a Royal Caribbean cruise ship. He briefly lived in Fort Lauderdale, Florida, during his infancy before his family relocated permanently back to Norway, where he grew up speaking Norwegian, English, and Spanish.

== Club career ==
=== Early career ===
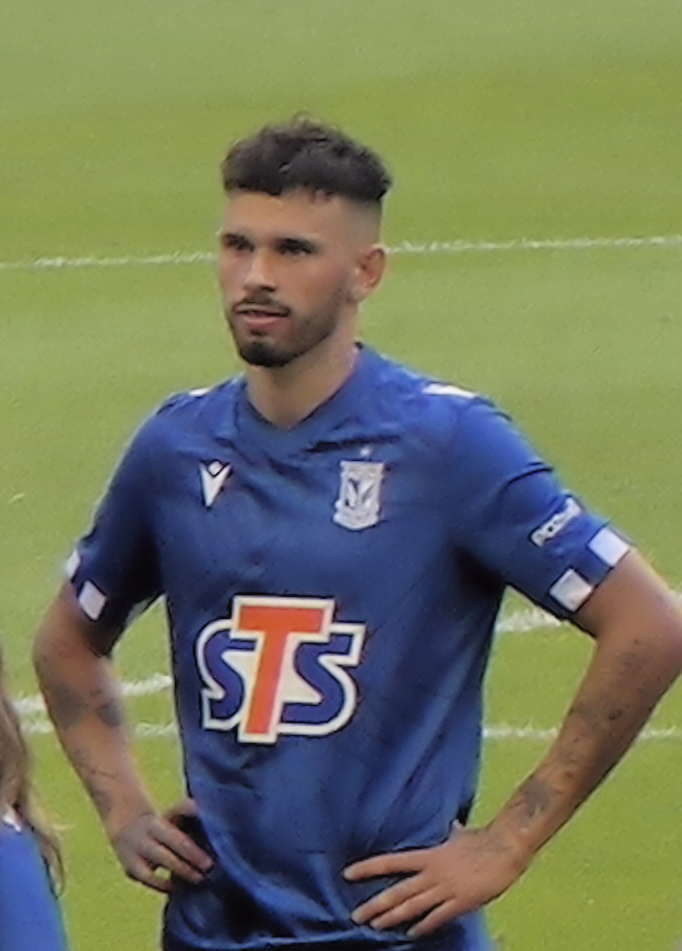
Velde with Lech Poznań in 2022.

Velde played youth football in Kopervik, spent the 2013 season in Vard's youth setup, returned to Kopervik before joining Haugesund in 2015. He made his senior debut in 2017.

In early January 2019 it was announced that Velde was loaned out to Nest-Sotra for the 2019 season. The loan was terminated in early April 2019.

He moved to Polish club Lech Poznań in January 2022. In his first half-season with the team, he played a back-up role as Lech won the 2021–22 Ekstraklasa title. In total, Velde made 98 appearances, scored 29 goals and assisted 18 more across all competitions for Lech.

=== Olympiacos ===
On 29 July 2024, Velde was transferred to Super League Greece club Olympiacos for an undisclosed fee, reported to be €3.5 million, with an additional €1.5 million in bonuses. He made 21 domestic league appearances and scored four goals during hissols season with the club.

=== Portland Timbers ===
On 13 August 2025, Velde signed a three-and-a-half-year contract with Major League Soccer side Portland Timbers as a Designated Player for a reported $5 million transfer fee. He made his competitive club debut later that autumn, scoring his first two goals for the franchise during the 2025 Audi MLS Cup Playoffs series against San Diego FC.

== International career ==
In 2017, he featured for the Norway under-19s. Velde received his first international callup for the senior team in June 2023, and won his first cap as a substitute against Cyprus.

== Personal life ==
Velde is half Argentinean. He is nicknamed "Veldinho".

== Career statistics ==
=== Club ===
As of match played 4 May 2025

Appearances and goals by club, season and competition
Club	Season	League			National cup (Note: Includes Norwegian Football Cup, Polish Cup, Greek Football Cup)		Europe		Other		Total	
Club	Season	Division	Apps	Goals	Apps	Goals	Apps	Goals	Apps	Goals	Apps	Goals
Haugesund	2017	Eliteserien	9	0	0	0	—		—		9	0
Haugesund	2018	Eliteserien	9	2	5	2	—		—		14	4
Haugesund	2019	Eliteserien	26	4	6	2	6 (Note: Appearances in UEFA Europa League)	2	—		38	8
Haugesund	2020	Eliteserien	28	8	0	0	—		—		28	8
Haugesund	2021	Eliteserien	29	7	1	0	—		—		30	7
Haugesund	Total		101	21	12	4	6	2	—		119	27
Lech Poznań	2021–22	Ekstraklasa	8	0	2	0	—		—		10	0
Lech Poznań	2022–23	Ekstraklasa	30	8	1	0	16 (Note: Two appearances and one goal in UEFA Champions League, fourteen appearances and seven goals in UEFA Europa Conference League)	8	1 (Note: Appearance in Polish Super Cup)	0	48	16
Lech Poznań	2023–24	Ekstraklasa	33	10	3	1	3 (Note: Appearances in UEFA Europa Conference League)	2	—		39	13
Lech Poznań	2024–25	Ekstraklasa	1	0	0	0	—		—		1	0
Lech Poznań	Total		72	18	6	1	19	10	1	0	98	29
Olympiacos	2024–25	Super League Greece	21	4	6	2	6	0	—		33	6
Career total			194	43	24	7	31	12	1	0	240	62

=== International ===
Appearances and goals by national team and year
National team	Year	Apps	Goals
Norway
Norway	2023	1	0
Total		1	0

== Honours ==
Olympiacos

- Super League Greece: 2024–25
- Greek Football Cup: 2024–25

Individual

- Ekstraklasa Player of the Month: May 2023
