= Helge Sandvik =

Norwegian footballer (born 1990)

Personal information
- Full name: Helge Valvatne Sandvik
- Date of birth: 15 February 1990 (age 36)
- Place of birth: Haugesund, Norway
- Height: 1.90 m (6 ft 3 in)
- Position: Goalkeeper

Team information
- Current team: Torvastad
- Number: 4

Senior career*
Years	Team	Apps	(Gls)
2009–2015	Vard Haugesund	135	(0)
2011	→ Haugesund (loan)	0	(0)
2015	→ Aalesund (loan)	1	(0)
2015–2021	Haugesund	71	(0)
2022–	Torvastad		
- * Club domestic league appearances and goals as of 12 December 2021

Helge Valvatne Sandvik (born 15 February 1990) is a Norwegian footballer who plays as a goalkeeper for Torvastad.

== Club career ==
Sandvik was born in Haugesund. He made his senior debut for Aalesund on 7 June 2015 against Haugesund; Aalesund won 2–1.

On 11 November 2015 he signed for Haugsund.

== Career statistics ==
As of 13 June 2020

Season	Club	Division	League		Cup		Total	
Season	Club	Division	Apps	Goals	Apps	Goals	Apps	Goals
2009	Vard Haugesund	2. divisjon	24	0	0	0	24	0
2010	Vard Haugesund	2. divisjon	26	0	0	0	26	0
2011	Haugesund	Tippeligaen	0	0	0	0	0	0
2012	Vard Haugesund	2. divisjon	26	0	2	0	28	0
2013	Vard Haugesund	Adeccoligaen	14	0	3	0	17	0
2014	Vard Haugesund	2. divisjon	26	0	3	0	29	0
2015	Vard Haugesund	2. divisjon	19	0	2	0	21	0
2015	Aalesund	Tippeligaen	1	0	0	0	1	0
2016	Haugesund	Tippeligaen	7	0	3	0	10	0
2017	Haugesund	Eliteserien	2	0	3	0	5	0
2018	Haugesund	Eliteserien	6	0	2	0	8	0
2019	Haugesund	Eliteserien	28	0	4	0	32	0
2020	Haugesund	Eliteserien	28	0	0	0	28	0
2021	Haugesund	Eliteserien	0	0	0	0	0	0
Career Total			207	0	22	0	229	0
