= Kevin Martin Krygård =

Norwegian football player (born 2000)

Personal information
- Full name: Kevin Martin Krygård
- Date of birth: 17 May 2000 (age 26)
- Place of birth: Haugesund, Norway
- Height: 1.84 m (6 ft 0 in)
- Position: Midfielder

Team information
- Current team: Lillestrøm
- Number: 18

Youth career
- 2012–2014: Djerv 1919
- 2015–2018: Haugesund

Senior career*
| Years | Team | Apps | (Gls) |
| 2019–2024 | Haugesund | 131 | (3) |
| 2024 | Casa Pia | 3 | (0) |
| 2024– | Lillestrøm | 29 | (0) |

International career
| 2015 | Norway U19 | 2 | (0) |
| 2016 | Norway U16 | 6 | (0) |
| 2019 | Norway U19 | 3 | (0) |
- * Club domestic league appearances and goals as of 23 July 2026

Kevin Martin Krygård (born 17 May 2000) is a Norwegian professional footballer who plays as a midfielder for Eliteserien club Lillestrøm.

== Club career ==
He played youth football in Djerv 1919, before joining Haugesund in 2015. He made his senior debut in 2019.

He first became a household name in Norwegian football after two goals, one at home and one away, in the 2019–20 Europa League qualifying round. Still a part-time footballer at the time, Krygård was originally scheduled to work as a cashier at the Shell gas station and kiosk in Sveio Municipality.

On 11 January 2024, he joined Primeira Liga side Casa Pia on a free transfer, signing a contract until June 2027 with the Portuguese club.

== Career statistics ==
=== Club ===
As of match played 27 April 2025

Appearances and goals by club, season and competition
| Club | Season | League | | | National Cup | | Europe | | Total | |
| Club | Season | Division | Apps | Goals | Apps | Goals | Apps | Goals | Apps | Goals |
|---|---|---|---|---|---|---|---|---|---|---|
| Haugesund | 2018 | Eliteserien | 0 | 0 | 1 | 0 | – | | 1 | 0 |
| Haugesund | 2019 | Eliteserien | 18 | 1 | 6 | 2 | 6 | 2 | 30 | 5 |
| Haugesund | 2020 | Eliteserien | 28 | 0 | 0 | 0 | – | | 28 | 0 |
| Haugesund | 2021 | Eliteserien | 29 | 1 | 0 | 0 | – | | 29 | 1 |
| Haugesund | 2022 | Eliteserien | 30 | 0 | 3 | 0 | – | | 33 | 0 |
| Haugesund | 2023 | Eliteserien | 26 | 1 | 3 | 0 | – | | 29 | 1 |
| Haugesund | Total | | 131 | 3 | 13 | 2 | 6 | 2 | 150 | 7 |
| Casa Pia | 2023–24 | Primeira Liga | 3 | 0 | 0 | 0 | – | | 3 | 0 |
| Lillestrøm | 2024 | Eliteserien | 14 | 0 | 1 | 0 | – | | 15 | 0 |
| Lillestrøm | 2025 | OBOS-ligaen | 4 | 0 | 2 | 0 | – | | 6 | 0 |
| Lillestrøm | Total | | 4 | 0 | 2 | 0 | 0 | 0 | 21 | 0 |
| Career total | | | 152 | 3 | 15 | 2 | 6 | 2 | 174 | 7 |
