= Benjamin Hansen (footballer) =

Danish footballer (born 1994)

Personal information
- Full name: Benjamin Tiedemann Hansen
- Date of birth: 7 February 1994 (age 32)
- Place of birth: Bogense, Denmark
- Height: 1.89 m (6 ft 2 in)
- Position: Centre-back

Team information
- Current team: AaB
- Number: 4

Youth career
- 1997–1999: Skovby GF
- 1999–2006: Bogense G&IF
- 2006–2009: Næsby
- 2009–2013: Vejle

Senior career*
Years	Team	Apps	(Gls)
2013	Vejle	0	(0)
2013–2016	Marienlyst	24	(0)
2016–2017	Fredericia	33	(1)
2017–2019	Nordsjælland	29	(0)
2019–2021	Haugesund	88	(4)
2022–2023	Molde	39	(1)
2023	→ AIK (loan)	5	(0)
2024–2025	AIK	37	(4)
2025–	AaB	16	(0)
- * Club domestic league appearances and goals as of 13 April 2026

Benjamin Tiedemann Hansen (born 7 February 1994) is a Danish professional footballer who plays as a centre-back for Danish 1st Division club AaB.

== Career ==
=== Early career ===
Hansen started his career as a three-year-old in Skovby GF. At the age of five, he moved to Bogense G&IF. As a 12-year-old he began playing for Næsby Boldklub's youth teams, where he played until 2009. His last season with Næsby Boldklub he played senior football in the Danish divisions at the age of 15.

In the summer of 2009 he began attending Vejle Idrætsefterskole, where he could combine an efterskole education, which his parents wanted, with playing academy football for Vejle Boldklub. He played for Vejle for four years for both the U17 and U19 teams. The first year he finished Danish folkeskole, after which he completed Higher Commercial Examination Programme (HHX) at the business high school at Campus Vejle.

=== Marienlyst ===
Hansen signed with Marienlyst on 6 July 2013. He played a total of three seasons for the club, and he was team captain for Marienlyst during his final season there.

=== Fredericia ===
Hansen moved to FC Fredericia in the summer of 2016. During his sole season at the club, he made 34 appearances.

=== Nordsjælland ===
Hansen signed with Danish Superliga club Nordsjælland in August 2017. He made his league debut on 22 September 2017 in a game against SønderjyskE, coming on as a substitute for Mads Aaquist in the 90th minute. Five days later, on 27 September 2017, he made his starting debut in the Danish Cup against Vejgaard BK, which FC Nordsjælland won 4–0 away at Soffy Road.

=== Haugesund ===
On 19 March 2019, Hansen signed with Norwegian club Haugesund. He played there for three seasons, and grew into the club's team captain, before leaving the club when his contract expired in December 2021. He made 102 total appearances for the club, scoring four goals.

=== Molde ===
On 2 February 2022, Molde reached an agreement for Hansen to join the club. He signed a three-year contract. He made his debut on 13 March in the round of 16 of the Norwegian Football Cup, starting at centre-back in a 3–2 win over Odd. Molde would eventually win the 2021–22 Norwegian Football Cup after a 1–0 win over Bodø/Glimt in the final, with Hansen playing the full game. Hansen made his league debut for Molde on the first matchday of the domestic season in a 1–0 win over Vålerenga on 2 April.

=== AIK ===
On 30 August 2023, Hansen joined Allsvenskan club AIK on a loan deal until December 2023, including an option to buy.

== Career statistics ==
=== Club ===
As of match played 25 June 2023

Appearances and goals by club, season and competition
Club	Season	League			National Cup		Europe		Total	
Club	Season	Division	Apps	Goals	Apps	Goals	Apps	Goals	Apps	Goals
Fredericia	2016–17	NordicBet Liga	30	1	0	0	–		30	1
Fredericia	2017–18	NordicBet Liga	3	0	0	0	–		3	0
Fredericia	Total		33	1	0	0	–		33	1
Nordsjælland	2017–18	Danish Superliga	19	0	0	0	–		19	0
Nordsjælland	2018–19	Danish Superliga	10	0	0	0	3	0	13	0
Nordsjælland	Total		29	0	0	0	3	0	32	0
Haugesund	2019	Eliteserien	30	1	6	0	6	0	42	1
Haugesund	2020	Eliteserien	30	1	0	0	–		30	1
Haugesund	2021	Eliteserien	29	2	1	0	–		30	2
Haugesund	Total		88	4	7	0	6	0	102	4
Molde	2022	Eliteserien	25	0	7	0	8	0	40	0
Molde	2023	Eliteserien	10	1	5	0	0	0	15	1
Molde	Total		35	1	12	0	8	0	55	1
Career total			185	6	19	0	17	0	221	6

== Honours ==
Molde

- Eliteserien: 2022
- Norwegian Cup: 2021–22
