= SK Vard Haugesund =

Norwegian football club

Vard Haugesund
- Full name: Sportsklubben Vard Haugesund
- Founded: 2 June 1916; 110 years ago
- Ground: Imenco Arena, Haugesund
- Capacity: 1,000 (653 seated)
- Coach: Kolbjørn Fosen
- League: 3. divisjon
- 2025: 2. divisjon group 1, 13th of 14 (relegated)
Home colours	Away colours	Third colours

Sportsklubben Vard Haugesund is a Norwegian professional football club located in Haugesund. The team currently plays in the 3. divisjon after being relegated from the 2. divisjon in 2025. The team reached the Norwegian Football Cup finals in 1962 and 1975. Vard played in the Norwegian top flight in 1976.

== Recent history ==
Season		Pos.	Pl.	W	D	L	GS	GA	P	Cup	Notes
2006	2. divisjon	3	26	14	4	8	62	39	56	First round	
2007	2. divisjon	4	26	12	6	8	49	48	42	Second round	
2008	2. divisjon	7	26	10	4	12	44	48	34	First round	
2009	2. divisjon	2	26	17	5	4	64	36	56	First round	
2010	2. divisjon	5	26	13	4	9	54	35	40	Second round	
2011	2. divisjon	2	26	13	5	8	57	35	44	First round	
2012	2. divisjon	↑ 1	26	15	8	3	60	26	53	Second round	Promoted
2013	1. divisjon	↓ 13	30	9	7	14	46	55	34	Third round	Relegated
2014	2. divisjon	3	26	12	5	9	57	38	41	Third round	
2015	2. divisjon	3	26	14	9	3	66	37	51	Second round	
2016	2. divisjon	4	26	11	7	8	46	34	40	Second round	
2017	2. divisjon	8	26	12	3	11	33	36	39	Second round	
2018	2. divisjon	↓ 14	26	3	5	18	31	56	14	First round	Relegated
2019	3. divisjon	↑ 1	26	20	3	3	103	22	63	Second round	Promoted
2020	2. divisjon	4	19	11	1	7	34	19	34	Cancelled	
2021	2. divisjon	5	26	13	4	9	39	32	43	First round	
2022	2. divisjon	10	24	5	8	11	32	43	23	Second round	
2023	2. divisjon	11	26	7	6	13	33	47	27	Third round	
2024	2. divisjon	8	26	10	4	12	45	49	34	Second round	
2025	2. divisjon	↓ 13	26	5	11	10	37	46	26	First round	Relegated
2026	3. divisjon									Second round	

== Current squad ==
As of 3 September 2025

Note: Flags indicate national team as defined under FIFA eligibility rules; some limited exceptions apply. Players may hold more than one non-FIFA nationality.

No.	Pos.	Nation	Player
1	GK	NOR	Sondre Svanes Strand
2	DF	NOR	André Lønning
3	DF	NOR	Sivert Helgesen
4	DF	NOR	Jens Jonassen
5	DF	NOR	Tolleiv Helgesen
6	DF	DEN	Philip Banda
7	MF	NOR	Sixten Jensen
8	MF	NOR	Tobias Bjørnbye
9	FW	NOR	Martin Alvsaker (on loan from Haugesund)
10	FW	NOR	Sander Lille-Løvø

No.	Pos.	Nation	Player
11	FW	NOR	Torben Dvergsdal
14	FW	NOR	Dion Osdautaj
17	FW	NOR	Kaj-Stian Apeland
18	FW	NOR	Arent-Emil Hauge
19	MF	NOR	Andreas Eide
21	DF	NOR	Jone Halleråker Jensen
22	FW	NOR	Bård Brandeggen (on loan from Sandnes Ulf)
23	MF	NOR	Mathias Kjær Eikje
24	GK	NOR	Dennis Emberland
26	DF	CIV	Ben Karamoko

=== Out on loan ===
Note: Flags indicate national team as defined under FIFA eligibility rules; some limited exceptions apply. Players may hold more than one non-FIFA nationality.

No.	Pos.	Nation	Player
16	MF	NOR	Jesper Thorsen (at Åkra IL until 31 December 2025)
