= 2024 FK Haugesund season =

Haugesund
2024 season
- Chairman: Leif Helge Kaldheim
- Head coach: Óskar Hrafn Þorvaldsson (until 10 May); Sancheev Manoharan (from 10 May)
- Stadium: Haugesund Stadion
- Eliteserien: 14th
- Norwegian Cup: First round
- Top goalscorer: League: Sory Ibrahim Diarra (5); All: Sory Ibrahim Diarra (5)
Home colours	Away colours	Third colours

The 2024 season was FK Haugesund's 31st season in existence and the club's 15th consecutive season in the top flight of Norwegian football. In addition to the domestic league, FK Haugesund participated in this season's edition of the Norwegian Football Cup.

== Players ==
=== First team squad ===
As of 20 February 2024

Note: Flags indicate national team as defined under FIFA eligibility rules; some limited exceptions apply. Players may hold more than one non-FIFA nationality.

No.	Pos.	Nation	Player
1	GK	NOR	Egil Selvik
2	DF	NOR	Claus Niyukuri
3	DF	SWE	Oscar Krusnell
4	DF	DEN	Anders Bærtelsen
5	DF	ISL	Hlynur Freyr Karlsson
8	FW	NOR	Morten Konradsen
9	FW	NOR	Sondre Liseth
10	MF	NOR	Emir Derviskadic
11	FW	TUN	Sebastian Tounekti
12	GK	NOR	Amund Wichne
13	MF	ISL	Anton Logi Lúðvíksson
14	FW	NOR	Martin Samuelsen
15	DF	NOR	Ulrik Fredriksen
16	MF	CPV	Bruno Leite
17	FW	KOR	Seo Jong-min

No.	Pos.	Nation	Player
20	FW	BFA	Ismaël Seone
21	MF	DEN	Julius Eskesen
22	GK	NOR	Aslak Falch
24	MF	NOR	Troy Engseth Nyhammer
25	DF	NOR	Mikkel Hope
29	FW	MLI	Sory Ibrahim Diarra
36	DF	NOR	Eivind Helgeland
37	MF	NOR	Sander Håvik Innvær
38	MF	NOR	Vegard Solheim
39	MF	NOR	Martin Alvsaker
40	MF	NOR	Almar Gjerd Grindhaug
55	DF	SEN	Madiodio Dia
66	MF	CIV	Amidou Traore
99	FW	SOM	Bilal Njie

=== Out on loan ===
Note: Flags indicate national team as defined under FIFA eligibility rules; some limited exceptions apply. Players may hold more than one non-FIFA nationality.

No.	Pos.	Nation	Player
—	DF	NOR	Nikolas Walstad (at Stabæk until 31 December 2024)

== Transfers ==
=== Winter ===
In: Note: Flags indicate national team as defined under FIFA eligibility rules; some limited exceptions apply. Players may hold more than one non-FIFA nationality.

No.	Pos.	Nation	Player
5	DF	ISL	Hlynur Freyr Karlsson (from (Iceland) Valur)
8	MF	NOR	Morten Konradsen (from Bodø/Glimt)
10	MF	NOR	Emir Derviskadic (from Start)
13	MF	ISL	Anton Logi Lúðvíksson (from (Iceland) Breiðablik)
17	FW	KOR	Seo Jong-min (from (Germany) Dynamo Dresden)
20	FW	BFA	Ismaël Seone (from (Burkina Faso) Salitas)
22	GK	NOR	Aslak Falch (from Sandnes Ulf)
24	MF	NOR	Jonas Sundli-Härdig (promoted from junior squad)
31	GK	NOR	Einar Bøe Fauskanger (promoted from junior squad)
39	MF	NOR	Martin Alvsaker (promoted from junior squad)
40	MF	NOR	Almar Grindhaug (promoted from junior squad)

Out: Note: Flags indicate national team as defined under FIFA eligibility rules; some limited exceptions apply. Players may hold more than one non-FIFA nationality.

No.	Pos.	Nation	Player
6	MF	DEN	Magnus Christensen (to Stabæk)
7	MF	DEN	Peter Therkildsen (to (Sweden) Djurgården)
8	MF	NOR	Kevin Krygård (to (Portugal) Casa Pia)
16	FW	NOR	Alexander Søderlund (to Vard Haugesund)
17	FW	NGR	Oluwasegun Otusanya (loan return to (Nigeria) Stars Builders Academy)
20	MF	COD	Michee Ngalina (loan return to (Turkey) Göztepe)
23	MF	NED	Daan Huisman (loan return to (Netherlands) Vitesse)
30	FW	ISL	Kjartan Kári Halldórsson (to (Iceland) FH, previously on loan)
—	DF	NOR	Eivind Helgeland (on loan to Mjøndalen)
42	GK	NOR	Sander Kaldråstøyl Østraat (to Hamkam)
–	GK	NOR	Frank Stople (to Strømsgodset, previously on loan at Vard)

== Competitions ==
=== Overview ===
Competition	First match	Last match	Starting round	Final position	Record							
Competition	First match	Last match	Starting round	Final position	Pld	W	D	L	GF	GA	GD	Win %
Eliteserien	31 March 2024	1 December 2024	Matchday 1	14th	30	9	6	15	29	46	−17	30.00
Eliteserien relegation play-offs	5 December 2024	8 December 2024	First leg	Winners	2	1	1	0	2	0	+2	50.00
Norwegian Cup	10 April 2024		First round	First round	1	0	1	0	1	1	+0	0.00
Total					33	10	8	15	32	47	−15	30.30

Last updated: 8 December 2024
Source: Soccerway

=== Eliteserien ===
==== League table ====
Pos	Team	Pld	W	D	L	GF	GA	GD	Pts	Qualification or relegation
12	HamKam	30	8	9	13	34	39	−5	33	
13	Tromsø	30	9	6	15	34	44	−10	33	
14	Haugesund (O)	30	9	6	15	29	46	−17	33	Qualification for the relegation play-offs
15	Lillestrøm (R)	30	7	3	20	33	63	−30	24	Relegation to First Division
16	Odd (R)	30	5	8	17	26	54	−28	23	Relegation to First Division

Source: Football Association of Norway (in Norwegian)
Rules for classification: 1) Points; 2) Goal difference; 3) Goals scored; 4) Head-to-head points; 5) Head-to-head goal difference; 6) Head-to-head goals scored.
(O) Play-off winners; (R) Relegated

==== Results summary ====
Overall								Home						Away					
Pld	W	D	L	GF	GA	GD	Pts	W	D	L	GF	GA	GD	W	D	L	GF	GA	GD
30	9	6	15	29	46	−17	33	6	1	8	11	16	−5	3	5	7	18	30	−12

Last updated: 1 December 2024.

==== Results by round ====
Round	1	2	3	4	5	6	7	8	9	10	11	12	13	14	15	16	17	18	19	20	21	22	23	24	25	26	27	28	29	30
Ground	A	H	A	H	A	H	A	H	A	H	H	A	H	A	H	A	A	H	A	H	A	H	A	H	A	H	A	H	A	H
Result	W	L	W	L	L	L	D	W	L	W	L	L	L	D	W	L	L	L	D	W	D	D	L	L	D	L	W	W	L	W
Position	6	11	4	7	11	12	12	9	11	9	10	12	12	13	12	13	13	15	14	13	13	13	13	13	14	14	14	14	14	14

A = Away; H = Home; W = Win; D = Draw; L = Loss

==== Matches ====
The league fixtures were announced on 20 December 2023.

31 March 2024 1	Odd	1–2	Haugesund	Skien
18:00 CEST (UTC+2)	Ruud (yellow card) 19'; Miettinen 51'; Ingebrigtsen (yellow card) 78'	Report	Leite 39'; Niyukuri (yellow card) 70'; Eskesen (yellow card) 87'; Seone 90+2'; Liseth (yellow card) 90+6'	Stadium: Skagerak Arena; Attendance: 5,649; Referee: Marius Hansen Grøtta

7 April 2024 2	Haugesund	0–2	Lillestrøm	Haugesund
17:00 CEST (UTC+2)	Diarra (yellow card) 24'; Seone (yellow card) 80'	Report	Olsen 13'; Kitolano 34'; Garnås (yellow card) 45+3'	Stadium: Haugesund Stadion; Attendance: 7,134; Referee: Sivert Øksnes Amland

14 April 2024 3	Tromsø	0–1	Haugesund	Tromsø
17:00 CEST (UTC+2)	Norheim (yellow card) 76'; Winther (yellow card) 87'	Report	Diarra 10'; Tounekti (yellow card) 64'; Lúðvíksson (yellow card) 70'; Leite (yellow card) 71'; Hope (yellow card) 81'; Niyukuri (yellow card) 90+8'	Stadium: Romssa Arena; Attendance: 4,031; Referee: Mohammad Usamn Aslam

21 April 2024 4	Haugesund	1–3	Rosenborg	Haugesund
17:00 CEST (UTC+2)	Leite (yellow card) 40' (goal) 50'; Niyukuri (yellow card) 88'	Report	Sæter 10', 43' (penalty missed) 74'; Selnæs (yellow card) 28'; Yttergård Jenssen (yellow card) 54'; Dahl Reitan (yellow card) 76'; Broholm 90+6'	Stadium: Haugesund Stadion; Attendance: 5,023; Referee: Ola Hobber Nilsen

28 April 2024 5	Molde	2–1	Haugesund	Molde
17:00 CEST (UTC+2)	Eikrem 4'; Eriksen 10' (yellow card) 42'; Gulbrandsen (yellow card) 49'	Report	Diarra 69'; Lúðvíksson (yellow card) 90+2'	Stadium: Aker Stadion; Attendance: 6,160; Referee: Christian Moen

5 May 2024 6	Haugesund	0–1	KFUM Oslo	Haugesund
17:00 CEST (UTC+2)	Diarra (yellow card) 17'; Krusnell (yellow card) 80'	Report	Nuñez 44'; Haltvik (yellow card) 90+2'	Stadium: Haugesund Stadion; Attendance: 4,017; Referee: Mathias Støfringshaug

12 May 2024 7	HamKam	2–2	Haugesund	Hamar
17:00 CEST (UTC+2)	Ødegård 4'; Sjølstad (yellow card) 21'; Norheim 74'; Kongsro (yellow card) 90'	Report	Leite (yellow card) 43'; Bærtelsen (yellow card) 58'; Diarra 59'; Konradsen 61'	Stadium: Briskeby Stadion; Attendance: 3,011; Referee: Marius Lien

16 May 2024 8	Haugesund	1–0	Kristiansund	Haugesund
18:00 CEST (UTC+2)	Tounekti 47' (yellow card) 79'	Report	Bruseth (yellow card) 17'; Rakneberg (yellow card) 56'	Stadium: Haugesund Stadion; Attendance: 6,628; Referee: Kristoffer Hagenes

20 May 2024 9	Strømsgodset	2–0	Haugesund	Drammen
17:00 CEST (UTC+2)	Bærtelsen 45+1' (o.g.); Melkersen 53'	Report		Stadium: Marienlyst Stadion; Attendance: 5,346; Referee: Espen Eskås

26 May 2024 10	Haugesund	2–1	Sandefjord	Haugesund
17:00 CEST (UTC+2)	Diarra (yellow card) 24'; Eskesen 64' (pen.); Niyukuri 81'; Hope (yellow card) 84'; Nyhammer (yellow card) 86' (yellow-red card) 90+5'	Report	Ruud Tveter 50'; Amin (yellow card) 78'; Egeli (yellow card) 84'	Stadium: Haugesund Stadion; Attendance: 3,615; Referee: Christian Moen

2 June 2024 11	Haugesund	0–1	Bodø/Glimt	Haugesund
17:00 CEST (UTC+2)	Leite (yellow card) 26'	Report	Sørensen (yellow card) 11'; Gundersen (yellow card) 39'; Saltnes 66'	Stadium: Haugesund Sparebank Arena; Attendance: 4,649; Referee: Marius Lien

28 June 2024 12	Fredrikstad	1–0	Haugesund	Fredrikstad
19:00 CEST (UTC+2)	Traoré 90+2'	Report	Fredriksen (yellow card) 80'	Stadium: Fredrikstad Stadion; Attendance: 6,369; Referee: Sivert Øksnes Amland

7 July 2024 13	Haugesund	1–2	Sarpsborg 08	Haugesund
17:00 CEST (UTC+2)	Liseth (red card) 2'; Sauer 68'; Selvik (yellow card) 90+4'; Nyhammer (yellow card) 90+5'	Report	Casas (yellow card) 30'; Meister (yellow card) 46'; Hiim (yellow card) 71'; Berget 79', 90+7'	Stadium: Haugesund Sparebank Arena; Attendance: 3,641; Referee: Mathias Støfringshaug

13 July 2024 14	Brann	1–1	Haugesund	Bergen
19:15 CEST (UTC+2)	Castro (yellow card) 68'; Warming 72'	Report	Diarra (yellow card) 6'; Selvik (yellow card) 71'; Sery Larsen 84' (o.g.); Seone (yellow card) 88'; Tounekti (yellow card) 90+5'	Stadium: Brann Stadion; Attendance: 15,757; Referee: Marius Hansen Grøtta

21 July 2024 15	Haugesund	1–0	Viking	Haugesund
17:00 CEST (UTC+2)	Hope (yellow card) 16'; Tounekti 47'; Bizoza (yellow card) 83'	Report	Christiansen (yellow card) 37'; Haugen (yellow card) 88'	Stadium: Haugesund Stadion; Attendance: 6,828; Referee: Tore Hansen

28 July 2024 16	Sandefjord	4–3	Haugesund	Sandefjord
17:00 CEST (UTC+2)	Mettler 25'; Dunsby 35', 38'; Markovic 90+4' (pen.)	Report	Liseth 23'; Leite 47'; Bizoza 74' (yellow card) 76'; Eskesen (yellow card) 79'; Bærtelsen (yellow card) 87'	Stadium: Jotun Arena; Attendance: 3,115; Referee: Kristoffer Hagenes

3 August 2024 17	Bodø/Glimt	4–2	Haugesund	Bodø
18:00 CEST (UTC+2)	Helmersen 45+1'; Høgh 55', 74'; Berg 62'	Report	Tounekti 19'; Bizoza (yellow card) 48'; Hope 50'	Stadium: Aspmyra Stadion; Attendance: 6,647; Referee: Marius Lien

10 August 2024 18	Haugesund	0–1	HamKam	Haugesund
16:00 CEST (UTC+2)	Bizoza (yellow card) 64'; Tounekti (yellow card) 73'	Report	Mares (yellow card) 45+1'; Mawa 50'; Norheim (yellow card) 78'; Nilsen (yellow card) 90+5'	Stadium: Haugesund Sparebank Arena; Attendance: 3,678; Referee: Marius Hansen Grøtta

18 August 2024 19	Sarpsborg 08	2–2	Haugesund	Sarpsborg
17:00 CEST (UTC+2)	Ørjasæter (yellow card) 9'; Uchenna 27'; Job 62'; Ngouali (yellow card) 90+3'	Report	Eskesen 35'; Leite (yellow card) 53'; Diarra 81' (pen.); Manoharan (yellow card) 85'; Bærtelsen (yellow card) 89'	Stadium: Sarpsborg Stadion; Attendance: 4,493; Referee: Christian Moen

25 August 2024 20	Haugesund	1–0	Fredrikstad	Haugesund
17:00 CEST (UTC+2)	Nyhammer 85'	Report		Stadium: Haugesund Sparebank Arena; Attendance: 5,550; Referee: Tore Hansen

1 September 2024 21	Kristiansund	2–2	Haugesund	Kristiansund
17:00 CEST (UTC+2)	Lien 15'; Isaksen 46'; Ulvestad (yellow card) 66'; Rakneberg (yellow card) 85'	Report	Diarra (yellow card) 34'; Innvær 38'; Sauer (yellow card) 72'; Eskesen (yellow card) 74' (goal) 76'	Stadium: Kristiansund Stadion; Attendance: 3,927; Referee: Mohammad Usman Aslam

15 September 2024 22	Haugesund	0–0	Strømsgodset	Haugesund
17:00 CEST (UTC+2)	Bærtelsen (yellow card) 53'; Bizoza (yellow card) 74'; Nyhammer (yellow card) 87'	Report	Farji (yellow card) 85'	Stadium: Haugesund Sparebank Arena; Attendance: 3,761; Referee: Kristoffer Hagenes

22 September 2024 23	Rosenborg	4–0	Haugesund	Trondheim
17:00 CEST (UTC+2)	Holm 12'; E. Ceïde 38'; Nypan 61'; Sæter 88'	Report	Diarra (yellow card) 54'	Stadium: Lerkendal Stadion; Attendance: 12,328; Referee: Sivert Øksnes Amland

28 September 2024 24	Haugesund	0–1	Brann	Haugesund
18:00 CEST (UTC+2)	Bizoza (yellow card) 56'; Tounekti (yellow card) 68'; Hope (yellow card) 88'	Report	Heggebø 36'; Castro (yellow card) 84'	Stadium: Haugesund Sparebank Arena; Attendance: 7,620; Referee: Marius Hansen Grøtta

20 October 2024 25	KFUM Oslo	0–0	Haugesund	Oslo
17:00 CEST (UTC+2)	Svindland (yellow card) 62'	Report		Stadium: KFUM Arena; Attendance: 1,930; Referee: Mathias Støfringshaug

27 October 2024 26	Haugesund	0–3	Molde	Haugesund
17:00 CET (UTC+1)	Diarra (yellow card) 45+4'; Liseth (yellow card) 72'; Lúðvíksson (yellow card) 81'; Sauer (yellow card) 90'	Report	Eriksen 1'; Haugan (yellow card) 78' (goal) 90+3'; Ihler 83' (pen.); Brynhildsen (yellow card) 90+1'	Stadium: Haugesund Sparebank Arena; Attendance: 3,802; Referee: Sivert Øksnes Amland

3 November 2024 27	Lillestrøm	0–1	Haugesund	Lillestrøm
17:00 CET (UTC+1)	Hoff (yellow card) 17'; Krygård (yellow card) 63'	Report	Bærtelsen (yellow card) 30'; Eskesen (yellow card) 45+3'; Diarra 65'; Innvær (yellow card) 84'; Selvik (yellow card) 86'; Krusnell (yellow card) 90+3'	Stadium: Åråsen Stadion; Attendance: 7,203; Referee: Rohit Saggi

10 November 2024 28	Haugesund	2–0	Tromsø	Haugesund
17:00 CET (UTC+1)	Tounekti 45'; Konradsen 65'; Krusnell (yellow card) 75'	Report		Stadium: Haugesund Sparebank Arena; Attendance: 4,531; Referee: Espen Eskås

23 November 2024 29	Viking	5–1	Haugesund	Stavanger
17:00 CET (UTC+2)	Langås 40'; Cappis (yellow card) 42'; D'Agostino 55', 59'; Salvesen 73'; Løkberg 90'	Report	Krusnell 7' (yellow card) 27'; Selvik (yellow card) 18' (yellow-red card) 42'; Liseth (yellow card) 90+2'	Stadium: SR-Bank Arena; Attendance: 14,701; Referee: Kristoffer Hagenes

1 December 2024 30	Haugesund	2–1	Odd	Haugesund
17:00 CET (UTC+1)	Samuelsen 72'; Bærtelsen 79' (pen.)	Report	Hagen 29'; Aas (yellow card) 53'; Owusu (yellow card) 78'	Stadium: Haugesund Sparebank Arena; Attendance: 3,964; Referee: Mohammad Usman Aslam

==== Relegation play-offs ====
5 December 2024 Final First leg	Moss	0–0	Haugesund	Moss
18:30 CET (UTC+1)	Cassidy (yellow card) 60'; Kukleci (yellow card) 89'	Report	Tounekti (yellow card) 18'; Krusnell (yellow card) 90+2'	Stadium: Melløs Stadion; Attendance: 2,557; Referee: Tore Hansen

8 December 2024 Final Second leg	Haugesund	2–0 (2–0 agg.)	Moss	Haugesund
14:30 CET (UTC+1)	Håpnes 24' (o.g.); Liseth 34'; Nyhammer (yellow card) 90+2'	Report	Harrison (yellow card) 78' (yellow-red card) 89'; Andresen (yellow card) 90+3'	Stadium: Haugesund Sparebank Arena; Attendance: 5,851; Referee: Rohit Saggi

=== Norwegian Football Cup ===
10 April 2024 First round	Torvastad	1–1 (a.e.t.) (2–0 p)	Haugesund	Torvastad
18:00 CEST (UTC+2)	Aase (yellow card) 40'; Lippestad 52'; Apeland (yellow card) 70'; Grønningen (yellow card) 83'; Iversen (yellow card) 90+4'; Sætre (yellow card) 120+2'	Report	Seo 66'	Stadium: Torvastad idrettssenter Referee: Sondre Brudvik
	Penalties
	Jacobsen (penalty scored); Sætre (penalty missed); Miljeteig (penalty scored); Apeland (penalty missed)		(penalty missed) Tounekti; (penalty missed) Traoré; (penalty missed) Karlsson; (penalty missed) Krusnnell
