= List of FK Haugesund seasons =

This is a list of seasons played by Fotballklubben Haugesund in Norwegian and European football from their first season in 1994 to the most recent completed season. It details the club's achievements in major competitions, and the top scorers for some season. The statistics is up to date as of the end of the 2024 season.

Season	League											Cup	Europe	Top goalscorer		Ref
Season	Tier	Division (Grp.)	P	W	D	L	GF	GA	Pts	Pos.	Att.	Cup	Europe	Name	Goals	Ref
1994	3	2. divisjon (4)	22	18	3	1	56	15	57	↑ 1st	—	2R				
1995	2	1. divisjon (1)	22	12	2	8	41	33	38	4th	—	1R				
1996	2	1. divisjon (2)	22	14	5	3	44	21	47	↑ 1st	—	3R				
1997	1	Tippeligaen	26	9	5	12	31	38	32	9th	4,827	QF				
1998	1	Tippeligaen	26	6	5	15	41	55	23	↓ 13th	3,950	4R				
1999	2	1. divisjon	26	16	4	6	61	32	52	↑ 1st	—	4R				
2000	1	Tippeligaen	26	5	4	17	33	62	19	↓ 14th	3,424	3R		Berggren	11	
2001	2	1. divisjon	30	17	5	8	76	44	56	4th	—	2R				
2002	2	1. divisjon	30	11	7	12	46	59	40	9th	—	3R				
2003	2	1. divisjon	30	13	10	7	53	42	49	6th	—	QF		Wiken	12	
2004	2	1. divisjon	30	11	4	15	44	59	37	↓ 14th	—	4R		Grindheim	9	
2005	3	2. divisjon (3)	26	14	9	3	65	31	51	↑ 2nd	—	2R				
2006	2	1. divisjon	30	11	5	14	40	37	38	9th	1,716	3R		Antoine-Curier	8	
2007	2	1. divisjon	30	10	9	11	49	52	39	8th	1,771	2nd		Antoine-Curier; Johnsen; Weaver	7	
2008	2	1. divisjon	30	11	9	10	48	47	42	7th	1,963	4R		Weaver	9	
2009	2	1. divisjon	30	18	4	8	67	37	58	↑ 1st	2,666	3R		Sørum	24	
2010	1	Tippeligaen	30	12	9	9	51	39	45	6th	4,661	4R		Đurđić	12	
2011	1	Tippeligaen	30	14	5	11	55	43	47	6th	4,550	4R		Đurđić	12	
2012	1	Tippeligaen	30	11	9	10	46	40	42	7th	4,532	QF		Đurđić	12	
2013	1	Tippeligaen	30	15	6	9	41	39	51	3rd	5,079	SF		C. Gytkjær	11	
2014	1	Tippeligaen	30	10	6	14	43	49	36	11th	5,580	QF	Europa League – 2QR	C. Gytkjær	15	
2015	1	Tippeligaen	30	8	7	15	33	52	31	12th	5,386	2R		C. Gytkjær	10	
2016	1	Tippeligaen	30	12	10	8	47	43	46	4th	5,212	4R		Agdestein	10	
2017	1	Eliteserien	30	11	6	13	35	39	39	10th	4,455	4R	Europa League – 2QR	Abdi; F. Gytkjær; Ibrahim	6	
2018	1	Eliteserien	30	16	5	9	45	33	53	4th	4,317	QF		Akintola	9	
2019	1	Eliteserien	30	9	13	8	44	37	40	7th	4,186	2nd	Europa League – 3QR	Sandberg; Samuelsen	6	
2020	1	Eliteserien	30	11	6	13	39	51	39	9th	333	Cancelled		Velde	8	
2021	1	Eliteserien	30	9	8	13	46	45	35	11th	2,613	1R		Wadji	8	
2022	1	Eliteserien	30	10	8	12	42	46	38	10th	3,902	4R		Ndour	9	
2023	1	Eliteserien	30	9	6	15	34	40	33	12th	4,984	3R		Diarra	8	
2024	1	Eliteserien	30	9	6	15	29	46	33	14th	4,963	1R		Diarra	5	
2025 *	1	Eliteserien	24	1	3	20	14	61	6	↓ 16th	3,935	3R		Diarra	2	
