= 2023 FK Haugesund season =

Haugesund
2023 season
- Chairman: Leif Helge Kaldheim
- Head coach: Jostein Grindhaug (until 10 September); Sancheev Manoharan (interim) (10 September - 16 October); Óskar Hrafn Þorvaldsson (from 16 October)
- Stadium: Haugesund Stadion
- Eliteserien: 12th
- 2022 Norwegian Cup: Fourth round
- 2023 Norwegian Cup: Third round
- Top goalscorer: League: Sory Ibrahim Diarra (8); All: Sory Ibrahim Diarra (9)
Home colours	Away colours	Third colours

The 2023 season was FK Haugesund's 30th season in existence and the club's 14th consecutive season in the top flight of Norwegian football. In addition to the domestic league, FK Haugesund participated in this season's edition of the Norwegian Football Cup.

== Players ==
=== First team squad ===
As of 4 September 2023

Note: Flags indicate national team as defined under FIFA eligibility rules; some limited exceptions apply. Players may hold more than one non-FIFA nationality.

No.	Pos.	Nation	Player
1	GK	NOR	Egil Selvik
2	DF	NOR	Claus Niyukuri
3	DF	SWE	Oscar Krusnell
4	DF	DEN	Anders Bærtelsen
6	MF	DEN	Magnus Christensen
7	MF	DEN	Peter Therkildsen
8	MF	NOR	Kevin Martin Krygård
9	MF	NOR	Sondre Liseth
11	FW	TUN	Sebastian Tounekti
12	GK	NOR	Amund Wichne
14	FW	NOR	Martin Samuelsen
15	DF	NOR	Ulrik Fredriksen
16	FW	NOR	Alexander Søderlund

No.	Pos.	Nation	Player
17	MF	NGR	Oluwasegun Outsanya
20	MF	COD	Michee Ngalina (on loan from Göztepe)
21	MF	DEN	Julius Eskesen
23	MF	NED	Daan Huisman
24	FW	NOR	Troy Engseth Nyhammer
25	DF	NOR	Mikkel Hope
26	MF	CPV	Bruno Leite
29	FW	MLI	Sory Ibrahim Diarra
38	MF	NOR	Vegard Solheim
42	GK	NOR	Sander Kaldråstøyl Østraat
99	FW	NOR	Bilal Njie
—	DF	SEN	Madiodio Dia

=== Out on loan ===
Note: Flags indicate national team as defined under FIFA eligibility rules; some limited exceptions apply. Players may hold more than one non-FIFA nationality.

No.	Pos.	Nation	Player
3	DF	NOR	Nikolas Walstad (at Stabæk until 31 December 2023)
18	FW	ISL	Kjartan Kári Halldórsson (at FH until 31 December 2023)

No.	Pos.	Nation	Player
19	FW	NOR	Joacim Holtan (at Kongsvinger until 31 December 2023)
32	GK	NOR	Frank Stople (at Vard Haugesund until 31 December 2023)

== Transfers ==
=== Winter ===
In: Note: Flags indicate national team as defined under FIFA eligibility rules; some limited exceptions apply. Players may hold more than one non-FIFA nationality.

No.	Pos.	Nation	Player
2	DF	NOR	Claus Niyukuri (from Vard)
3	DF	SWE	Oscar Krusnell (from (Sweden) Brommapojkarna)
10	MF	ALB	Adrion Pajaziti (from (England) Fulham Academy)
12	GK	NOR	Amund Wichne (from Jerv)
17	FW	NGR	Oluwasegun Otusanya (from (Nigeria) Stars Builders Academy)
24	MF	NOR	Troy Engseth Nyhammer (promoted from junior squad)
25	DF	NOR	Mikkel Hope (promoted from junior squad)
29	FW	MLI	Sory Ibrahim Diarra (from (Romania) Petrolul)
30	FW	ISL	Kjartan Kári Halldórsson (from (Iceland) Grótta)
42	GK	NOR	Sander Kaldråstøyl Østraat (promoted from junior squad)

Out: Note: Flags indicate national team as defined under FIFA eligibility rules; some limited exceptions apply. Players may hold more than one non-FIFA nationality.

No.	Pos.	Nation	Player
3	DF	NOR	Nikolas Walstad (on loan to Stabæk)
10	MF	NOR	Christos Zafeiris (to (Czech Republic) Slavia Prague)
17	FW	NGR	Hilary Gong (to Ararat-Armenia)
20	MF	NOR	Torje Naustdal (to Skeid, previously on loan at Grorud)
23	DF	NOR	Thore Pedersen (to Brann)
30	MF	SEN	Ibrahima Cissokho (loan return to (Senegal) US Gorée)
30	FW	ISL	Kjartan Kári Halldórsson (on loan to (Iceland) FH)
32	GK	NOR	Frank Stople (on loan to Vard)
–	FW	NOR	Joacim Holtan (on loan to Kongsvinger, previously on loan at Start)
–	FW	NOR	Andreas Endresen (to Vard, previously on loan)

=== Summer ===
In: Note: Flags indicate national team as defined under FIFA eligibility rules; some limited exceptions apply. Players may hold more than one non-FIFA nationality.

No.	Pos.	Nation	Player
11	FW	TUN	Sebastian Tounekti (loan return from Ranheim)
20	FW	COD	Michee Ngalina (on loan from (Turkey) Göztepe)
—	MF	CIV	Amidou Traoré (from (Ivory Coast) Leader d'Agboville)
—	DF	SEN	Madiodio Dia (from (Senegal) ASC Linguère)
23		NED	Daan Huisman (from (Netherlands) Vitesse)
36	DF	NOR	Eivind Helgeland (loan return from Vard)

Out: Note: Flags indicate national team as defined under FIFA eligibility rules; some limited exceptions apply. Players may hold more than one non-FIFA nationality.

No.	Pos.	Nation	Player
5	DF	DEN	Søren Reese (to (Denmark) Horsens)
10	MF	ALB	Adrion Pajaziti (loan return to (England) Fulham Academy)
11	FW	TUN	Sebastian Tounekti (on loan to Ranheim)
27	MF	NOR	Mads Berg Sande (to Brann)
–	FW	NOR	Joacim Holtan (to Kongsvinger, previously on loan)

== Competitions ==
=== Overview ===
Competition	First match	Last match	Starting round	Final position	Record							
Competition	First match	Last match	Starting round	Final position	Pld	W	D	L	GF	GA	GD	Win %
Eliteserien	10 April 2023	3 December 2023	Matchday 1	12th	30	9	6	15	34	40	−6	30.00
2022 Norwegian Cup	12 March 2023		Fourth round	Fourth round	1	0	0	1	1	3	−2	0.00
2023 Norwegian Cup	25 May 2023	7 June 2023	First round	Third round	3	2	0	1	6	4	+2	66.67
Total					34	11	6	17	41	47	−6	32.35

Last updated: 3 December 2023
Source: Soccerway

=== Eliteserien ===
==== League table ====
Pos	Team	Pld	W	D	L	GF	GA	GD	Pts	Qualification or relegation
10	Odd	30	10	8	12	42	44	−2	38	
11	HamKam	30	10	4	16	39	59	−20	34	
12	Haugesund	30	9	6	15	34	40	−6	33	
13	Sandefjord	30	8	7	15	47	55	−8	31	
14	Vålerenga (R)	30	7	8	15	39	50	−11	29	Qualification for the relegation play-offs

Source: Football Association of Norway (in Norwegian)
Rules for classification: 1) Points; 2) Goal difference; 3) Goals scored; 4) Head-to-head points; 5) Head-to-head goal difference; 6) Head-to-head goals scored.
(R) Relegated

==== Results summary ====
Overall								Home						Away					
Pld	W	D	L	GF	GA	GD	Pts	W	D	L	GF	GA	GD	W	D	L	GF	GA	GD
30	9	6	15	34	40	−6	33	7	2	6	24	20	+4	2	4	9	10	20	−10

Last updated: 3 December 2023.

==== Results by round ====
Round	1	2	3	4	5	6	7	8	9	10	11	12	13	14	15	16	17	18	19	20	21	22	23	24	25	26	27	28	29	30
Ground	A	H	A	H	A	H	A	H	A	H	A	H	A	A	H	A	H	A	H	A	H	H	A	H	A	H	A	H	A	H
Result	L	W	L	D	D	D	L	L	W	W	L	W	L	L	W	L	L	D	L	D	L	L	D	W	W	L	L	L	W	
Position	16	12	13	12	13	13	14	15	13	11	13	11	11	12	11	11	11	11	13	13	13	14	14	13	11	11	11	12	12	12

Updated to match(es) played on 3 December 2023. Source:
A = Away; H = Home; W = Win; D = Draw; L = Loss

==== Matches ====
The league fixtures were announced on 9 December 2022.

10 April 2023 1	Brann	3–0	Haugesund	Bergen
19:15 CEST (UTC+2)	Heltne Nilsen 32' (pen.); Finne 34', 48'	Report		Stadium: Brann Stadion; Attendance: 15,224; Referee: Rohit Saggi

16 April 2023 2	Haugesund	3–2	HamKam	Haugesund
17:00 CEST (UTC+2)	Sande 45'; Diarra 49' (pen.); Krusnell 89'	Report	Faraas 84'; Wiedesheim-Paul 90+2'	Stadium: Haugesund Stadion; Attendance: 7,239; Referee: Svein Tore Sinnes

23 April 2023 3	Stabæk	3–0	Haugesund	Bærum
17:00 CEST (UTC+2)	Krusnell 20' (o.g.); Høgh 64'; Pedersen 80'	Report		Stadium: Nadderud stadion Attendance: 2,214; Referee: Marius Lien

30 April 2023 4	Haugesund	0–0	Sarpsborg 08	Haugesund
17:00 CEST (UTC+2)		Report		Stadium: Haugesund Stadion; Attendance: 3,768; Referee: Jan Morten Tennøy

7 May 2023 5	Aalesund	0–0	Haugesund	Ålesund
17:00 CEST (UTC+2)		Report		Stadium: Color Line Stadion; Attendance: 4,471; Referee: Ola Hobber Nilsen

13 May 2023 6	Haugesund	1–1	Vålerenga	Haugesund
19:15 CEST (UTC+2)	Njie 61'	Report	Riisnæs 65'	Stadium: Haugesund Stadion; Attendance: 4,253; Referee: Sigurd Smehus Kringstad

16 May 2023 7	Rosenborg	1–0	Haugesund	Trondheim
18:00 CEST (UTC+2)	Bjørlo 57'	Report		Stadium: Lerkendal Stadion; Attendance: 21,264; Referee: Rohit Saggi

29 May 2023 8	Haugesund	1–2	Tromsø	Haugesund
17:00 CEST (UTC+2)	Leite 32'	Report	Gundersen 18'; Jenssen 49'	Stadium: Haugesund Stadion; Attendance: 3,807; Referee: Steinar Hauge

4 June 2023 9	Strømsgodset	1–2	Haugesund	Drammen
17:00 CEST (UTC+2)	Vilsvik 71'	Report	Therkildsen 18'; Diarra 75'	Stadium: Marienlyst Stadion; Attendance: 4,709; Referee: Marius Lien

11 June 2023 10	Haugesund	3–2	Sandefjord	Haugesund
17:00 CEST (UTC+2)	Njie 10'; Taaje 13' (o.g.); Diarra 20'	Report	Al-Saed 55'; Nyenetue 90+3'	Stadium: Haugesund Stadion; Attendance: 3,709; Referee: Espen Eskås

25 June 2023 11	Molde	1–0	Haugesund	Molde
17:00 CEST (UTC+2)	Brynhildsen 39'	Report		Stadium: Aker Stadion; Attendance: 6,125; Referee: Sivert Øksnes Amland

2 July 2023 12	Haugesund	2–1	Odd	Haugesund
17:00 CEST (UTC+2)	Njie 41'; Samuelsen 80'	Report	Johansen 27'	Stadium: Haugesund Stadion; Attendance: 4,101; Referee: Ajdin Medic

8 July 2023 13	Viking	2–0	Haugesund	Stavanger
18:00 CEST (UTC+2)	Salvesen 63'; Tripic 73'	Report		Stadium: Viking Stadion; Attendance: 10,420; Referee: Kristoffer Hagenes

16 July 2023 14	Bodø/Glimt	2–1	Haugesund	Bodø
17:00 CEST (UTC+2)	Pemi 46'; Sørli 56'	Report	Leite 3'	Stadium: Aspmyra Stadion; Attendance: 6,661; Referee: Svein Tore Sinnes

23 July 2023 15	Haugesund	1–0	Lillestrøm	Haugesund
17:00 CEST (UTC+2)	Reese 76'	Report		Stadium: Haugesund Stadion; Attendance: 3,860; Referee: Marius Hansen Grøtta

30 July 2023 16	Sarpsborg 08	2–1	Haugesund	Sarpsborg
17:00 CEST (UTC+2)	Torp 52'; Utvik 79'	Report	Skipper 17' (o.g.)	Stadium: Sarpsborg Stadion; Attendance: 4,154; Referee: Espen Andreas Eskås

6 August 2023 17	Haugesund	1–2	Rosenborg	Haugesund
17:00 CEST (UTC+2)	Diarra 3'	Report	Røsten 66'; Holte 89'	Stadium: Haugesund Stadion; Attendance: 4,556; Referee: Sigurd Smehus Kringstad

13 August 2023 18	Vålerenga	1–1	Haugesund	Oslo
19:15 CEST (UTC+2)	Strand 71'	Report	Diarra 7'	Stadium: Intility Arena; Attendance: 7,785; Referee: Tore Hansen

20 August 2023 19	Haugesund	1–3	Bodø/Glimt	Haugesund
17:00 CEST (UTC+2)	Diarra 48'	Report	Pellegrino 51', 72'; Pemi 62'	Stadium: Haugesund Stadion; Attendance: 5,342; Referee: Mohammad Usman Aslam

27 August 2023 20	Sandefjord	0–0	Haugesund	Sandefjord
19:15 CEST (UTC+2)		Report		Stadium: Release Arena; Attendance: 2,845; Referee: Rohit Saggi

3 September 2023 21	Haugesund	1–2	Molde	Haugesund
17:00 CEST (UTC+2)	Bærtelsen 82'	Report	Berisha 7'; Eikrem 70'	Stadium: Haugesund Stadion; Attendance: 3,416; Referee: Kai Erik Steen

16 September 2023 22	Haugesund	0–2	Viking	Haugesund
18:00 CEST (UTC+2)		Report	Langås 41'; Tripić 64'	Stadium: Haugesund Stadion; Attendance: 8,210; Referee: Espen Eskås

24 September 2023 23	Odd	1–1	Haugesund	Skien
17:00 CEST (UTC+2)	Ruud 73'	Report	Fredriksen 54'	Stadium: Skagerak Arena; Attendance: 4,500; Referee: Steinar Hauge

8 October 2023 24	Haugesund	1–0	Strømsgodset	Haugesund
17:00 CEST (UTC+2)	Niyukuri 69'	Report		Stadium: Haugesund Stadion; Attendance: 4,236; Referee: Tore Hansen

22 October 2023 25	HamKam	0–3	Haugesund	Hamar
17:00 CEST (UTC+2)		Report	Therkildsen 30'; Eskesen 88'; Søderlund 90+5'	Stadium: Briskeby Stadion; Attendance: 4,011; Referee: Marius Hansen Grøtta

29 October 2023 26	Haugesund	6–1	Aalesund	Haugesund
17:00 CET (UTC+1)	Niyukuri 7'; Hopland 11' (o.g.); Søderlund 38'; Krygård 80'; Therkildsen 90+1'; Diarra 90+6'	Report	Diop 77'	Stadium: Haugesund Stadion; Attendance: 5,016; Referee: Marius Lien

5 November 2023 27	Lillestrøm	1–0	Haugesund	Lillestrøm
17:00 CET (UTC+1)	Garnås 57'	Report		Stadium: Åråsen Stadion; Attendance: 7,003; Referee: Sigurd Kringstad

11 November 2023 28	Haugesund	0–2	Brann	Haugesund
18:00 CET (UTC+1)		Report	Castro 17' (pen.); Myhre 39'	Stadium: Haugesund Stadion; Attendance: 8,070; Referee: Ola Hobber Nilsen

26 November 2023 29	Tromsø	2–1	Haugesund	Tromsø
17:00 CET (UTC+1)	Psyché 35'; Vesterlund 52'	Report	Diarra 74'	Stadium: Romssa Arena; Attendance: 6,067; Referee: Christian Moen

3 December 2023 30	Haugesund	3–0	Stabæk	Haugesund
17:00 CET (UTC+1)	Samuelsen 74'; Njie 77', 90+2'	Report		Stadium: Haugesund Stadion; Attendance: 5,061; Referee: Sigurd Smehus Kringstad

=== Norwegian Football Cup ===
==== 2022 ====
12 March 2023 Fourth round	Brann	3–1	Haugesund	Bergen
13:00 CET (UTC+1)	Finne 10', 71'; Rasmussen 11'	Report	Christensen 66'	Stadium: Åsane Arena; Attendance: 3,033; Referee: Espen Eskås

==== 2023 ====
25 May 2023 First round	Staal Jørpeland	1–2	Haugesund	Jørpeland
18:00 CEST (UTC+2)	Ciach 87'	Report	Pajaziti 10', 28'	Stadium: Jørpeland Stadion; Attendance: 700; Referee: Ola Kellerhals

1 June 2023 Second round	Stord	1–3	Haugesund	Leirvik
18:00 CEST (UTC+2)	Handeland 44'	Report	Njie 51', 67', 83'	Stadium: Stord Stadion; Attendance: 989; Referee: Sondre Brudvik

7 June 2023 Third round	Brattvåg	2–1	Haugesund	Brattvåg
18:00 CEST (UTC+2)	Sissoko 74', 80'	Report	Diarra 41' (pen.)	Stadium: Brattvåg gras Attendance: 362; Referee: Marius Hansen Grøtta
