= 2025 Viking FK season =

Viking FK 2025 football season

Viking
2025 season
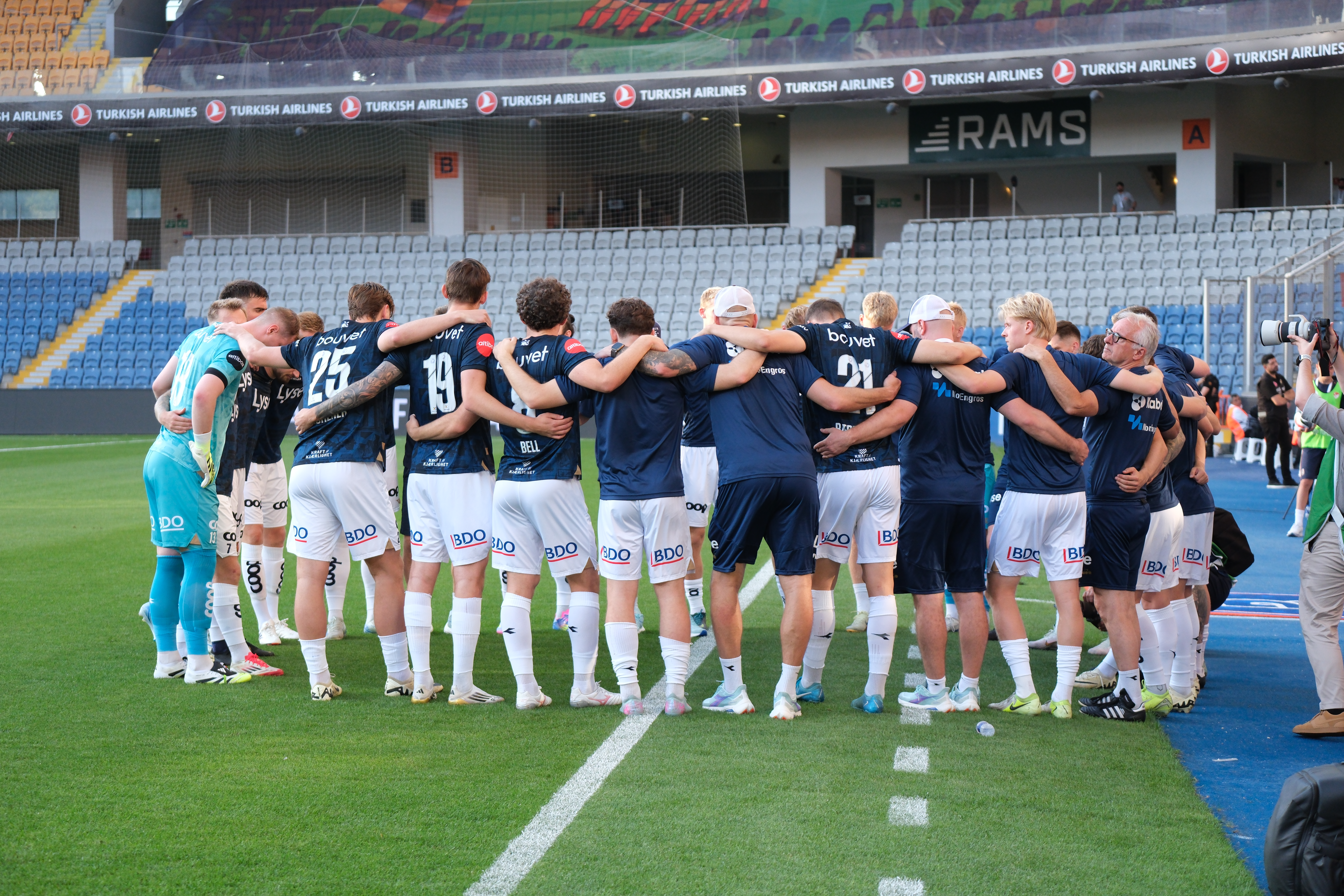
- Viking players and staff before an away match against İstanbul Başakşehir, 13 August 2025
- Chairman: Jan Henrik Jelsa
- Manager(s): Bjarte Lunde Aarsheim; Morten Jensen
- Stadium: Viking Stadion
- Eliteserien: 1st (champions)
- Norwegian Cup: Semi-finals
- UEFA Conference League: Third qualifying round
- Top goalscorer: League: Peter Christiansen (14); All: Peter Christiansen (18)
- Highest home attendance: 15,900 vs List: Sandefjord (Eliteserien, 16 May); Brann (Eliteserien, 5 October); Bryne (Eliteserien, 25 October); Vålerenga (Eliteserien, 30 November)
- Lowest home attendance: 7,744 vs Koper (UEFA Conference League, 24 July)
- Average home league attendance: 13,731
| Home colours | Away colours |

The 2025 season was Viking's 7th consecutive year in the Eliteserien, and their 75th season in the top flight of Norwegian football. The club participated in the 2025 Eliteserien, 2025 Norwegian Cup, 2025–26 Norwegian Cup and the 2025–26 UEFA Conference League. It was the club's fifth season with Bjarte Lunde Aarsheim and Morten Jensen as managers.

The club clinched their ninth Norwegian top division title with a 5–1 win over Vålerenga on 30 November 2025.

== Transfers ==
=== Transfers in ===
| Date | Pos. | Name | From | Fee | Ref. |
|---|---|---|---|---|---|
| 18 December 2024 | DF | (Norway) Henrik Falchener | Egersund | Undisclosed | |
| 10 January 2025 | FW | (Iceland) Hilmir Rafn Mikaelsson | (Italy) Venezia | Undisclosed | |
| 15 January 2025 | GK | (Norway) Kristoffer Klaesson | (Denmark) AGF | Undisclosed | |
| 18 February 2025 | DF | (Norway) Martin Ove Roseth | Lillestrøm | Undisclosed | |
| 28 February 2025 | GK | (Norway) Thomas Kinn | Mjøndalen | Free transfer | |
| 12 March 2025 | DF | (Denmark) Anders Bærtelsen | Haugesund | Undisclosed | |
| 26 March 2025 | MF | (Norway) Kristoffer Askildsen | (Denmark) Midtjylland | Undisclosed | |
| 12 July 2025 | DF | (Norway) Kristoffer Haugen | Molde | Undisclosed | |
| 18 July 2025 | MF | (Norway) Ruben Alte | Kristiansund | Undisclosed | |
| 5 August 2025 | FW | (Norway) Veton Berisha | Molde | Free transfer | |

=== Transfers out ===
| Date | Pos. | Name | To | Fee | Ref. |
|---|---|---|---|---|---|
| 31 December 2024 | MF | (Norway) Kristoffer Løkberg | Retired | | |
| 15 January 2025 | MF | (Sweden) Hampus Finndell | (Sweden) Djurgården | Undisclosed | |
| 15 January 2025 | FW | (Norway) Lars-Jørgen Salvesen | (England) Derby County | Undisclosed | |
| 18 January 2025 | DF | (Norway) Kristoffer Forgaard Paulsen | Retired | | |
| 1 February 2025 | DF | (Norway) Sondre Langås | (England) Derby County | Undisclosed | |
| 12 June 2025 | DF | (Slovenia) Jošt Urbančič | (Slovenia) Olimpija Ljubljana | Undisclosed | |
| 24 July 2025 | MF | (United States) Christian Cappis | (United States) FC Dallas | Undisclosed | |
| 16 August 2025 | DF | (Norway) Felix Lillehammer | Jerv | Undisclosed | |
| 17 August 2025 | GK | (Norway) Thomas Kinn | (Finland) AC Oulu | Undisclosed | |
| 26 August 2025 | FW | (Norway) Jørgen Galta | Brattvåg | Undisclosed | |

=== Loans out ===
| Start date | Pos. | Name | To | End date | Ref. |
|---|---|---|---|---|---|
| 4 February 2025 | FW | (Norway) Jørgen Galta | Sandnes Ulf | 26 August 2025 | |
| 26 February 2025 | DF | (Norway) Felix Lillehammer | Jerv | 16 August 2025 | |
| 25 March 2025 | GK | (Norway) Aksel Bergsvik | Sandviken | End of season | |
| 27 March 2025 | MF | (Norway) Ola Visted | Hødd | End of season | |
| 23 May 2025 | GK | (Norway) Magnus Rugland Ree | Åsane | End of season | |
| 23 May 2025 | MF | (Norway) Kasper Sætherbø | Mjøndalen | End of season | |
| 3 July 2025 | DF | (Australia) Franco Lino | (Australia) Melbourne Victory | End of 2025–26 season | |
| 15 August 2025 | FW | (Norway) Niklas Fuglestad | Moss | End of season | |
| 17 August 2025 | DF | (Norway) Tobias Moi | Åsane | 8 September 2025 | |

== Competitions ==
=== Overall record ===
| Competition | First match | Last match | Starting round | Final position | Record | | | | | | | |
| Competition | First match | Last match | Starting round | Final position | Pld | W | D | L | GF | GA | GD | Win % |
|---|---|---|---|---|---|---|---|---|---|---|---|---|
| Eliteserien | 30 March 2025 | 30 November 2025 | Matchday 1 | Winners | 30 | 22 | 5 | 3 | 77 | 36 | +41 | 73.33 |
| 2025 Norwegian Cup | 13 April 2025 | 9 July 2025 | First round | Semi-final | 6 | 5 | 0 | 1 | 18 | 1 | +17 | 83.33 |
| 2025–26 Norwegian Cup | 24 September 2025 | 2026 | Third round | | 1 | 1 | 0 | 0 | 2 | 0 | +2 | 100.00 |
| UEFA Conference League | 24 July 2025 | 13 August 2025 | Second qualifying round | Third qualifying round | 4 | 2 | 1 | 1 | 14 | 7 | +7 | 50.00 |
| Total | | | | | 41 | 30 | 6 | 5 | 111 | 44 | +67 | 73.17 |

Last updated: 30 November 2025
Source: Competitions

=== Eliteserien ===
==== Table ====
| Pos | Team | Pld | W | D | L | GF | GA | GD | Pts | Qualification or relegation |
|---|---|---|---|---|---|---|---|---|---|---|
| 1 | Viking (C) | 30 | 22 | 5 | 3 | 77 | 36 | +41 | 71 | Qualification for the Champions League play-off round |
| 2 | Bodø/Glimt | 30 | 22 | 4 | 4 | 85 | 28 | +57 | 70 | Qualification for the Champions League third qualifying round |
| 3 | Tromsø | 30 | 18 | 3 | 9 | 50 | 36 | +14 | 57 | Qualification for the Europa League second qualifying round (Note: Lillestrøm from the 2025 Norwegian First Division qualified for the Europa League play-off round as winners of the 2025 Norwegian Football Cup.) |
| 4 | Brann | 30 | 17 | 5 | 8 | 55 | 46 | +9 | 56 | Qualification for the Conference League second qualifying round |
| 5 | Sandefjord | 30 | 15 | 3 | 12 | 55 | 42 | +13 | 48 | |

Source: Football Association of Norway (in Norwegian)
Rules for classification: 1) Points; 2) Goal difference; 3) Goals scored; 4) Head-to-head points; 5) Head-to-head goal difference; 6) Head-to-head goals scored.
(C) Champions

==== Results summary ====
| Overall | | | | | | | | Home | | | | | | Away | | | | | |
| Pld | W | D | L | GF | GA | GD | Pts | W | D | L | GF | GA | GD | W | D | L | GF | GA | GD |
|---|---|---|---|---|---|---|---|---|---|---|---|---|---|---|---|---|---|---|---|
| 30 | 22 | 5 | 3 | 77 | 36 | +41 | 71 | 12 | 2 | 1 | 43 | 15 | +28 | 10 | 3 | 2 | 34 | 21 | +13 |

Source: see below

==== Results by round ====
| Round | 1 | 2 | 3 | 4 | 5 | 6 | 7 | 8 | 9 | 10 | 11 | 12 | 13 | 14 | 15 | 16 | 17 | 18 | 19 | 20 | 21 | 22 | 23 | 24 | 25 | 26 | 27 | 28 | 29 | 30 |
|---|---|---|---|---|---|---|---|---|---|---|---|---|---|---|---|---|---|---|---|---|---|---|---|---|---|---|---|---|---|---|
| Ground | A | H | A | H | H | A | H | A | A | H | A | H | A | H | A | H | A | H | A | H | A | H | A | H | A | H | A | H | A | H |
| Result | L | W | W | D | D | W | W | W | W | W | D | W | L | L | W | W | W | W | W | W | D | W | D | W | W | W | W | W | W | W |
| Position | 13 | 8 | 5 | 5 | 6 | 6 | 3 | 2 | 2 | 2 | 2 | 1 | 3 | 3 | 3 | 2 | 2 | 2 | 2 | 2 | 2 | 2 | 2 | 2 | 2 | 2 | 1 | 1 | 1 | 1 |

Source: NIFS
A = Away; H = Home; W = Win; D = Draw; L = Loss

==== Matches ====
The league fixtures were announced on 20 December 2024. Round 16, 18 and 19 were rescheduled and played earlier in the season due to Viking's UEFA Conference League games during the summer.

| 30 March 2025 1 | Vålerenga | 3–1 | Viking | Oslo |
| 14:30 CEST | Sørensen 41'; Bjørdal 66', 79' | Report | Mikaelsson 62' | Stadium: Intility Arena; Attendance: 14,859; Referee: Rohit Saggi |

| 6 April 2025 2 | Viking | 3–1 | KFUM Oslo | Stavanger |
| 19:15 CEST | Urbančič 39'; Tønnessen 74' (o.g.); Tripić 83' (pen.) | Report | Njie 29' | Stadium: Viking Stadion; Attendance: 12,612; Referee: Tore Hansen |

| 10 April 2025 16 | Viking | 3–1 | Kristiansund | Stavanger |
| 19:00 CEST | Bell 47'; Heggheim 58'; Kvia-Egeskog 67' | Report | Tufekčić 28' (pen.) | Stadium: Viking Stadion; Attendance: 9,644; Referee: Mohammad Usman Aslam |

| 21 April 2025 3 | HamKam | 2–5 | Viking | Hamar |
| 17:00 CEST | Falchener 68' (o.g.); Gonstad 90+6' (pen.) | Report | Falchener 2', 37'; Svendsen 4'; Tripić 13' (pen.); Christiansen 54' | Stadium: Briskeby Stadion; Attendance: 3,917; Referee: Sivert Amland |

| 27 April 2025 4 | Viking | 4–4 | Tromsø | Stavanger |
| 19:15 CEST | Heggheim 53'; Austbø 57'; H. Haugen 90+4'; Roseth 90+7' | Report | Erlien 9', 47', 90+8'; Hjertø-Dahl 55' | Stadium: Viking Stadion; Attendance: 10,151; Referee: Marius Hansen Grøtta |

| 30 April 2025 18 | Viking | 5–1 | Haugesund | Stavanger |
| 18:00 CEST | Tripić 21' (pen.), 45+6' (pen.), 62'; Kvia-Egeskog 90+2'; Askildsen 90+4' | Report | Espejord 36' (pen.) | Stadium: Viking Stadion; Attendance: 12,158; Referee: Marius Lien |

| 4 May 2025 5 | Viking | 0–0 | Sarpsborg 08 | Stavanger |
| 17:00 CEST | | Report | | Stadium: Viking Stadion; Attendance: 10,572; Referee: Ola Hobber Nilsen |

| 11 May 2025 6 | Haugesund | 1–4 | Viking | Haugesund |
| 19:15 CEST | Diarra 79' | Report | Christiansen 35' 45+1'; Mikaelsson 89' (pen.); Fischer 90+7' (o.g.) | Stadium: Haugesund Stadion; Attendance: 5,716; Referee: Espen Eskås |

| 16 May 2025 7 | Viking | 3–1 | Sandefjord | Stavanger |
| 18:00 CEST | Christiansen 46'; Tripić 79' (pen.) 90+3' (pen.) | Report | Dunsby 59' | Stadium: Viking Stadion; Attendance: 15,900; Referee: Svein Sinnes |

| 25 May 2025 8 | Kristiansund | 0–1 | Viking | Kristiansund |
| 17:00 CEST | | Report | Austbø 57' | Stadium: Nordmøre Stadion; Attendance: 3,480; Referee: Christian Moen |

| 28 May 2025 19 | Bodø/Glimt | 2–4 | Viking | Bodø |
| 21:00 CEST | Høgh 25'; Gundersen 44' | Report | Austbø 28'; Tripić 73'; Bjørshol 83'; Kvia-Egeskog 90+1' | Stadium: Aspmyra Stadion; Attendance: 6,869; Referee: Kristoffer Hagenes |

| 1 June 2025 9 | Molde | 0–1 | Viking | Molde |
| 19:15 CEST | | Report | Falchener 3' | Stadium: Aker Stadion; Attendance: 5,429; Referee: Ola Nilsen |

| 22 June 2025 10 | Viking | 3–0 | Fredrikstad | Stavanger |
| 19:15 CEST | Bærtelsen 7'; Christiansen 60'; Auklend 80' | Report | | Stadium: Viking Stadion; Attendance: 13,566; Referee: Mathias Støfringshaug |

| 28 June 2025 11 | Rosenborg | 1–1 | Viking | Trondheim |
| 18:00 CEST | Islamović 70' | Report | Hansen 29' | Stadium: Lerkendal Stadion; Attendance: 13,663; Referee: Rohit Saggi |

| 5 July 2025 12 | Viking | 1–0 | Strømsgodset | Stavanger |
| 16:00 CEST | Hansen 38' | Report | | Stadium: Viking Stadion; Attendance: 13,363; Referee: Sivert Amland |

| 13 July 2025 13 | Brann | 3–1 | Viking | Bergen |
| 19:15 CEST | Soltvedt 18'; Sery Larsen 28'; Magnússon 77' | Report | Bell 90+2' | Stadium: Brann Stadion; Attendance: 17,500; Referee: Tore Hansen |

| 19 July 2025 14 | Viking | 2–4 | Bodø/Glimt | Stavanger |
| 18:00 CEST | Christiansen 6'; Tripić 22' (pen.) | Report | Evjen 1'; Høgh 14'; Bjørtuft 38'; Bell 70' (o.g.) | Stadium: Viking Stadion; Attendance: 15,311; Referee: Marius Grøtta |

| 27 July 2025 15 | Bryne | 1–3 | Viking | Bryne |
| 14:30 CEST | Qvigstad 86' | Report | Christiansen 3' 64'; Bærtelsen 50' | Stadium: Bryne Stadion; Attendance: 5,500; Referee: Espen Eskås |

| 10 August 2025 17 | Sandefjord | 1–2 | Viking | Sandefjord |
| 19:15 CEST | Patoulidis 26' | Report | Tripić 50' (pen.); Pedersen 90+2' (o.g.) | Stadium: Jotun Arena; Attendance: 6,284; Referee: Mohammad Aslam |

| 31 August 2025 20 | Viking | 2–1 | Rosenborg | Stavanger |
| 17:00 CEST | Berisha 39' (pen.), 57' | Report | Väänänen 86' | Stadium: Viking Stadion; Attendance: 14,859; Referee: Kristoffer Hagenes |

| 14 September 2025 21 | KFUM Oslo | 2–2 | Viking | Oslo |
| 17:00 CEST | Hickson 1'; Hestnes 19' | Report | Schneider 5' (o.g.); Roseth 73' | Stadium: KFUM Arena; Attendance: 2,323; Referee: Eivind Bodding |

| 21 September 2025 22 | Viking | 1–0 | Molde | Stavanger |
| 19:15 CEST | Kvia-Egeskog 61' | Report | | Stadium: Viking Stadion; Attendance: 14,567; Referee: Tore Hansen |

| 27 September 2025 23 | Sarpsborg 08 | 3–3 | Viking | Sarpsborg |
| 18:00 CEST | Reinhardsen 17'; Gudjohnsen 90+8'; Opoku 90+9' | Report | Austbø 7'; Falchener 40'; Christiansen 43' | Stadium: Sarpsborg Stadion; Attendance: 4,230; Referee: Rohit Saggi |

| 5 October 2025 24 | Viking | 3–0 | Brann | Stavanger |
| 14:30 CEST | Christiansen 7'; Austbø 43'; Svendsen 68' | Report | | Stadium: Viking Stadion; Attendance: 15,900; Referee: Ola Hobber Nilsen |

| 19 October 2025 25 | Tromsø | 1–3 | Viking | Tromsø |
| 14:30 CEST | Hjertø-Dahl 12' | Report | Christiansen 15' (pen.); Bjørshol 64'; D'Agostino 87' (pen.) | Stadium: Romssa Arena; Attendance: 5,021; Referee: Espen Eskås |

| 25 October 2025 26 | Viking | 5–1 | Bryne | Stavanger |
| 16:00 CET | Roseth 21'; Falchener 46'; Christiansen 54', 62'; D'Agostino 89' | Report | Grødem 67' | Stadium: Viking Stadion; Attendance: 15,900; Referee: Sivert Amland |

| 2 November 2025 27 | Strømsgodset | 1–2 | Viking | Drammen |
| 14:30 CET | Mehnert 13' | Report | Christiansen 38'; Stengel 45+2' (o.g.) | Stadium: Marienlyst Stadion; Attendance: 6,052; Referee: Marius Lien |

| 8 November 2025 28 | Viking | 3–0 | HamKam | Stavanger |
| 18:00 CET | Askildsen 55'; Bell 75'; Kvia-Egeskog 82' | Report | | Stadium: Viking Stadion; Attendance: 15,559; Referee: Svein Tore Sinnes |

| 23 November 2025 29 | Fredrikstad | 0–1 | Viking | Fredrikstad |
| 19:15 CET | | Report | Falchener 72' | Stadium: Fredrikstad Stadion; Attendance: 10,689; Referee: Sigurd Kringstad |

| 30 November 2025 30 | Viking | 5–1 | Vålerenga | Stavanger |
| 17:00 CET | Austbø 10'; Roseth 15'; Tripić 45+4' (pen.); K. Haugen 54'; Askildsen 72' | Report | Hagen 50' | Stadium: Viking Stadion; Attendance: 15,900; Referee: Tore Hansen |

=== 2025 Norwegian Cup ===
| 13 April 2025 First round | Hana | 0–6 | Viking | Sandnes |
| 16:00 CEST | | Report | Botnen 20'; Mikaelsson 29', 82' (pen.); Cappis 36'; Austbø 85'; Fuglestad 89' | Stadium: Hanabanen; Attendance: 1,500; Referee: Amir Ajjour |

| 24 April 2025 Second round | Fløy | 0–3 | Viking | Kristiansand |
| 18:00 CEST | | Report | Christiansen 71'; Hansen 79'; Svendsen 90' | Stadium: Cemo Arena; Referee: Svein Tore Sinnes |

| 7 May 2025 Third round | Moss | 0–1 | Viking | Moss |
| 19:05 CEST | | Report | Mikaelsson 90+3' | Stadium: Melløs Stadion; Attendance: 1,093; Referee: Rohit Saggi |

| 20 May 2025 Fourth round | Åsane | 0–7 | Viking | Bergen |
| 18:00 CEST | | Report | Christiansen 11', 63'; Vevatne 19'; Svendsen 30'; Kvia-Egeskog 49'; Fuglestad 64'; Mikaelsson 83' | Stadium: Åsane Arena; Attendance: 1,095; Referee: Stian Røvig Sletner |

| 25 June 2025 Quarter-final | Aalesund | 0–1 | Viking | Ålesund |
| 18:00 CEST | | Report | Christiansen 82' | Stadium: Color Line Stadion; Attendance: 3,796; Referee: Mohammad Usman Aslam |

| 9 July 2025 Semi-final | Sarpsborg 08 | 1–0 | Viking | Sarpsborg |
| 20:00 CEST | Berget 50' | Report | | Stadium: Sarpsborg Stadion; Attendance: 7,014; Referee: Kristoffer Hagenes |

=== 2025–26 Norwegian Cup ===
| 24 September 2025 Third round | Eik Tønsberg | 0–2 | Viking | Tønsberg |
| 18:00 CEST | | Report | Vevatne 16'; Tripić 45+2' | Stadium: Tønsberg Gressbane; Attendance: 2,293; Referee: Marius Lien |

=== UEFA Conference League ===
==== Qualifying ====
Second qualifying round

| 24 July 2025 First leg | Viking (Norway) | 7–0 | (Slovenia) Koper | Stavanger |
| 19:00 | Svendsen 6', 59'; Bærtelsen 57'; Tripić 68'; Mikaelsson 78' (pen.), 85'; Bjørshol 90+3' | Report | | Stadium: Viking Stadion; Attendance: 7,744; Referee: Sam Barrott (England) |

| 31 July 2025 Second leg | Koper (Slovenia) | 3–5 (3–12 agg.) | (Norway) Viking | Koper, Slovenia |
| 20:00 | D. Jurić 3' (pen.), 45'; Manseri 56' | Report | Svendsen 19', 52', 90'; Austbø 76', 89' | Stadium: Bonifika Stadium; Attendance: 1,016; Referee: Cláudio Filipe Ruivo Pereira (Portugal) |

Third qualifying round

| 7 August 2025 First leg | Viking (Norway) | 1–3 | (Turkey) İstanbul Başakşehir | Stavanger |
| 19:00 | Svendsen 2' | Report | Türüç 60'; Opéri 79'; Selke 90+4' | Stadium: Viking Stadion; Attendance: 11,652; Referee: Miguel Nogueira (Portugal) |

| 13 August 2025 Second leg | İstanbul Başakşehir (Turkey) | 1–1 (4–2 agg.) | (Norway) Viking | Istanbul, Turkey |
| 18:00 (19:00 UTC+3) | Selke 40' | Report | Bulut 34' (o.g.) | Stadium: Başakşehir Fatih Terim Stadium; Attendance: 6,763; Referee: Miloš Milanović (Serbia) |

== Squad statistics ==
=== Appearances and goals ===
As of match played 30 November 2025

| No. | Pos | Nat | Player | Total | | Eliteserien | | 2025 Cup | | 2025–26 Cup | | UEFA Conference League | |
| No. | Pos | Nat | Player | Apps | Goals | Apps | Goals | Apps | Goals | Apps | Goals | Apps | Goals |
|---|---|---|---|---|---|---|---|---|---|---|---|---|---|
| 1 | GK | (Norway) NOR | Arild Østbø | 16 | 0 | 12 | 0 | 2 | 0 | 1 | 0 | 1 | 0 |
| 2 | DF | (Norway) NOR | Herman Haugen | 27 | 1 | 19 | 1 | 5 | 0 | 1 | 0 | 2 | 0 |
| 3 | DF | (Norway) NOR | Viljar Vevatne | 15 | 2 | 8 | 0 | 5 | 1 | 1 | 1 | 1 | 0 |
| 4 | DF | (Norway) NOR | Martin Ove Roseth | 24 | 4 | 20 | 4 | 2 | 0 | 0 | 0 | 2 | 0 |
| 5 | DF | (Norway) NOR | Henrik Heggheim | 38 | 2 | 29 | 2 | 5 | 0 | 1 | 0 | 3 | 0 |
| 6 | DF | (Australia) AUS | Gianni Stensness | 7 | 0 | 6 | 0 | 0 | 0 | 1 | 0 | 0 | 0 |
| 7 | FW | (Norway) NOR | Sander Svendsen | 34 | 10 | 24 | 2 | 5 | 2 | 1 | 0 | 4 | 6 |
| 8 | MF | (New Zealand) NZL | Joe Bell | 37 | 3 | 29 | 3 | 5 | 0 | 0 | 0 | 3 | 0 |
| 9 | FW | (Australia) AUS | Nicholas D'Agostino | 12 | 3 | 10 | 3 | 0 | 0 | 0 | 0 | 2 | 0 |
| 10 | FW | (Norway) NOR | Zlatko Tripić | 33 | 12 | 25 | 11 | 3 | 0 | 1 | 0 | 4 | 1 |
| 11 | MF | (Norway) NOR | Yann-Erik de Lanlay | 2 | 0 | 1 | 0 | 0 | 0 | 1 | 0 | 0 | 0 |
| 13 | GK | (Norway) NOR | Kristoffer Klaesson | 19 | 0 | 14 | 0 | 2 | 0 | 0 | 0 | 3 | 0 |
| 14 | MF | (Norway) NOR | Ruben Alte | 13 | 0 | 9 | 0 | 0 | 0 | 1 | 0 | 3 | 0 |
| 16 | FW | (Norway) NOR | Veton Berisha | 7 | 2 | 5 | 2 | 0 | 0 | 0 | 0 | 2 | 0 |
| 17 | FW | (Norway) NOR | Edvin Austbø | 34 | 9 | 27 | 6 | 5 | 1 | 0 | 0 | 2 | 2 |
| 18 | DF | (Norway) NOR | Sondre Bjørshol | 24 | 3 | 17 | 2 | 3 | 0 | 0 | 0 | 4 | 1 |
| 19 | MF | (Norway) NOR | Kristoffer Askildsen | 37 | 3 | 27 | 3 | 5 | 0 | 1 | 0 | 4 | 0 |
| 20 | FW | (Denmark) DEN | Peter Christiansen | 37 | 18 | 29 | 14 | 6 | 4 | 1 | 0 | 1 | 0 |
| 21 | DF | (Denmark) DEN | Anders Bærtelsen | 28 | 3 | 21 | 2 | 2 | 0 | 1 | 0 | 4 | 1 |
| 23 | DF | (Slovenia) SVN | Jošt Urbančič | 9 | 1 | 7 | 1 | 2 | 0 | 0 | 0 | 0 | 0 |
| 23 | DF | (Norway) NOR | Kristoffer Haugen | 17 | 1 | 15 | 1 | 0 | 0 | 0 | 0 | 2 | 0 |
| 24 | DF | (Norway) NOR | Vetle Auklend | 15 | 1 | 7 | 1 | 6 | 0 | 0 | 0 | 2 | 0 |
| 25 | DF | (Norway) NOR | Henrik Falchener | 39 | 6 | 29 | 6 | 6 | 0 | 1 | 0 | 3 | 0 |
| 26 | MF | (Norway) NOR | Simen Kvia-Egeskog | 37 | 6 | 28 | 5 | 4 | 1 | 1 | 0 | 4 | 0 |
| 27 | MF | (United States) USA | Christian Cappis | 17 | 1 | 13 | 0 | 4 | 1 | 0 | 0 | 0 | 0 |
| 28 | FW | (Iceland) ISL | Hilmir Rafn Mikaelsson | 18 | 8 | 12 | 2 | 4 | 4 | 1 | 0 | 1 | 2 |
| 30 | GK | (Norway) NOR | Thomas Kinn | 7 | 0 | 5 | 0 | 2 | 0 | 0 | 0 | 0 | 0 |
| 31 | MF | (Norway) NOR | Niklas Fuglestad | 9 | 2 | 4 | 0 | 3 | 2 | 0 | 0 | 2 | 0 |
| 33 | MF | (Norway) NOR | Jakob Segadal Hansen | 35 | 3 | 25 | 2 | 6 | 1 | 1 | 0 | 3 | 0 |
| 35 | MF | (Norway) NOR | Tobias Moi | 2 | 0 | 0 | 0 | 0 | 0 | 0 | 0 | 2 | 0 |
| 38 | DF | (Norway) NOR | Fillip Voster Botnen | 1 | 1 | 0 | 0 | 1 | 1 | 0 | 0 | 0 | 0 |
