= Vegard Solheim =

Norwegian footballer (born 2004)

Personal information
- Date of birth: 10 August 2004 (age 22)
- Place of birth: Tysvær Municipality, Norway
- Position: Defender

Team information
- Current team: Haugesund
- Number: 18

Youth career
- –2019: Skjold
- 2020–2021: Haugesund

Senior career*
Years	Team	Apps	(Gls)
2022–	Haugesund	61	(1)
2024	→ Sandnes Ulf (loan)	10	(0)

International career^{‡}
2022	Norway U18	6	(0)
2023	Norway U19	7	(0)
- * Club domestic league appearances and goals as of 14 November 2026 ‡ National team caps and goals as of 9 November 2024

Vegard Solheim (born 10 August 2004) is a Norwegian footballer who plays as a defender for FK Haugesund.

== Career ==
Hailing from Tysvær Municipality, Solheim played youth football in Skjold IL. He joined FK Haugesund as a youth player in 2020, and in February 2022 FKH decided to name Solheim as a part of the first-team squad. In 2022 he also made his debut as a Norway youth international

Solheim made his FKH debut as a substitute in April 2022. In January and February 2023, Solheim was the most-used player during FK Haugesund's pre-season friendlies. He played left back. Originally having a contract until the end of 2024, ahead of the 2023 season his contract was prolonged to the end of 2026. His first start for Haugesund came in March 2023, in the cup match against Brann, and his first Eliteserien start came in April 2023 when Haugesund held Sarpsborg 08 to 0–0.

In the summer of 2024, Solheim was loaned out to struggling 1. divisjon team Sandnes Ulf. The loan originally spanned until the summer break, but Sandnes Ulf managed to prolong it. In mid-July he was recalled. Solheim got 10 league games and 3 cup games while at Sandnes Ulf.

As the 2024 Eliteserien was nearing its end, Haugesund fought against relegation. Solheim emerged as the starter in right back position following injury to Claus Niyukuri.

== Career statistics ==
As of 14 November 2026

Appearances and goals by club, season and competition
Club	Season	League			National Cup		Other		Total	
Club	Season	Division	Apps	Goals	Apps	Goals	Apps	Goals	Apps	Goals
Haugesund	2022	Eliteserien	4	0	2	1	—		6	1
Haugesund	2023	Eliteserien	13	0	2	0	—		15	0
Haugesund	2024	Eliteserien	7	0	1	0	2 (Note: Appearances in Eliteserien play-offs)	0	10	0
Haugesund	2025	Eliteserien	11	0	2	0	0	0	13	0
Haugesund	2026	Norwegian First Division	26	1	2	0	0	0	28	1
Haugesund	Total		61	1	9	1	2	0	72	2
Sandnes Ulf (loan)	2024	1. divisjon	10	0	3	0	—		13	0
Career total			71	1	12	1	2	0	85	2
