= 2020 FK Haugesund season =

Haugesund
2020 season
- Chairman: Leif Helge Kaldheim
- Manager: Jostein Grindhaug
- Stadium: Haugesund Stadion
- Eliteserien: 9th
- Norwegian Cup: Canceled due to the COVID-19 pandemic
- Top goalscorer: League: Kristoffer Velde (8); All: Kristoffer Velde (8)
Home colours	Away colours	Third colours

The 2020 season was Haugesund's 27th competitive season in the clubs history. During this season they competed in the Eliteserien.

== Season events ==
On 12 June, the Norwegian Football Federation announced that a maximum of 200 home fans would be allowed to attend the upcoming seasons matches.

On 10 September, the Norwegian Football Federation cancelled the 2020 Norwegian Cup due to the COVID-19 pandemic in Norway.

On 30 September, the Minister of Culture and Gender Equality, Abid Raja, announced that clubs would be able to have crowds of 600 at games from 12 October.

On 14 October, Haugesund's matches against Viking were postponed due to the Viking squad having to isolate after Veton Berisha tested positive for COVID-19, eventually being rearranged for 27 October.

== Squad ==
Note: Flags indicate national team as defined under FIFA eligibility rules; some limited exceptions apply. Players may hold more than one non-FIFA nationality.

No.	Pos.	Nation	Player
1	GK	NOR	Helge Sandvik
4	DF	NOR	Fredrik Knudsen
5	DF	DEN	Benjamin Hansen (Vice-captain)
6	DF	NOR	Joakim Nilsen
7	MF	NOR	Christian Grindheim (Captain)
8	MF	NOR	Kevin Krygård
9	FW	MLI	Ibrahima Koné
10	MF	NOR	Niklas Sandberg
11	FW	DEN	Alexander Ammitzbøll (on loan from AGF)
12	GK	CZE	Luděk Vejmola (on loan from Vysočina Jihlava)
15	DF	NOR	Ulrik Fredriksen

No.	Pos.	Nation	Player
16	MF	CPV	Bruno Leite
17	FW	SEN	Ibrahima Wadji
18	MF	NOR	Kristoffer Gunnarshaug
19	MF	DEN	Mikkel Desler
20	FW	DEN	Oliver Klitten (on loan from AaB)
21	DF	DEN	Peter Therkildsen (on loan from AC Horsens)
22	DF	NOR	Alexander Stølås
23	MF	NOR	Thore Pedersen
32	GK	NOR	Frank Stolpe
93	DF	NOR	Dennis Horneland
99	FW	NOR	Kristoffer Velde

=== Out on loan ===
Note: Flags indicate national team as defined under FIFA eligibility rules; some limited exceptions apply. Players may hold more than one non-FIFA nationality.

No. / Pos. / Nation / Player; 3 / DF / CIV / Benjamin Karamoko (at Aalesund)	No. / Pos. / Nation / Player; 27 / MF / NOR / Mads Sande (at Sandnes Ulf)

== Transfers ==
=== In ===
Date	Position	Nationality	Name	From	Fee	Ref.
13 January 2020	DF	(Norway)	Ulrik Fredriksen	Sogndal	Undisclosed	
20 February 2020	MF	(Norway)	Mads Sande	Øygarden	Undisclosed	

=== Loans in ===
Date from	Position	Nationality	Name	To	Date to	Ref.
7 February 2020	FW	(Finland)	Benjamin Källman	Inter Turku	14 August 2020	
7 February 2020	FW	(Denmark)	Alexander Ammitzbøll	AGF	End of season	
25 June 2020	GK	(Czech Republic)	Ludek Vejmola	Vysočina Jihlava	End of season	
29 September 2020	DF	(Denmark)	Peter Therkildsen	AC Horsens	End of season	
1 October 2020	FW	(Denmark)	Oliver Klitten	AaB	End of season	

=== Out ===
Date	Position	Nationality	Name	To	Fee	Ref.
24 January 2020	MF	(Norway)	Sondre Tronstad	SBV Vitesse	Undisclosed	
27 January 2020	MF	(Nigeria)	Anthony Ikedi	Øygarden	Undisclosed	
28 May 2020	FW	(Norway)	Torbjørn Kallevåg	Lillestrøm	Undisclosed	
13 June 2020	FW	(Nigeria)	Shuaibu Ibrahim	Mjøndalen	Undisclosed	

=== Loans out ===
Date from	Position	Nationality	Name	To	Date to	Ref.
9 January 2020	FW	(Mali)	Ibrahima Koné	Adana Demirspor	31 July 2020	
24 January 2020	DF	(Norway)	Dennis Horneland	Vard Haugesund	31 July 2020	
7 September 2020	DF	(Ivory Coast)	Benjamin Karamoko	Aalesund	End of season	
24 September 2020	MF	(Norway)	Mads Berg Sande	Sandnes Ulf	End of season	

=== Released ===
Date	Position	Nationality	Name	Joined	Date
13 December 2019	GK	(Poland)	Maciej Gostomski	Bytovia Bytów	
31 December 2019	GK	(Norway)	Herman Fossdal	Djerv 1919	
31 December 2019	DF	(Norway)	Stian Ringstad	Ull/Kisa	
31 December 2019	FW	(Norway)	Eric Ndayisenga	Djerv 1919	

== Friendlies ==
30 May 2020	Haugesund	3–0	Brann	Haugesund
15:00 CEST (UTC+2)		Report		Stadium: Haugesund Stadion

10 June 2020	Haugesund	1–1	Viking	Haugesund
18:00 CEST (UTC+2)		Report		Stadium: Haugesund Stadion

== Competitions ==
=== Eliteserien ===
==== Results summary ====
Overall								Home						Away					
Pld	W	D	L	GF	GA	GD	Pts	W	D	L	GF	GA	GD	W	D	L	GF	GA	GD
30	11	6	13	39	51	−12	39	6	3	6	22	26	−4	5	3	7	17	25	−8

Last updated: 22 December 2020.
Source: Results

==== Results by round ====
Round	1	2	3	4	5	6	7	8	9	10	11	12	13	14	15	16	17	18	19	20	21	22	23	24	25	26	27	28	29	30
Ground	H	A	H	A	H	A	H	A	H	H	A	H	A	H	A	H	A	A	H	A	H	A	H	A	H	A	H	A	H	A
Result	L	L	D	W	W	D	L	L	L	W	D	W	L	L	W	W	L	L	D	L	W	W	L	W	W	L	D	D	L	W
Position	12	15	14	12	9	10	11	11	13	11	11	10	11	12	9	8	10	11	12	13	10	9	10	9	8	9	9	8	9	9

Updated to match(es) played on 22 December 2020. Source: Results
A = Away; H = Home; W = Win; D = Draw; L = Loss

==== Results ====
17 June 2020 1	Haugesund	1–2	Brann	Haugesund
20:30 CEST (UTC+2)	Krygård (yellow card) 45'; Sandberg 60'	Report	Taylor 50'; Barmen (yellow card) 57'; Koomson (yellow card) 59'; Acosta (yellow card) 65'; Teniste (yellow card) 71'; D.Pedersen 90+6'	Stadium: Haugesund Stadion; Attendance: 200; Referee: Rohit Saggi

21 June 2020 2	Bodø/Glimt	6–1	Haugesund	Bodø
18:00 CEST (UTC+2)	Berg 16'; Junker 23', 45', 49'; J.Hauge 51'; Foosnæs (yellow card) 87'; Skytte 90'	Report	Leite (yellow card) 32'; Sandberg 79' (pen.)	Stadium: Aspmyra Stadion; Attendance: 200; Referee: Marius Grøtta

24 June 2020 3	Haugesund	2–2	Kristiansund	Haugesund
18:00 CEST (UTC+2)	Ammitzbøll 47'; Sandberg 70'; Nilsen (yellow card) 76'	Report	Askar 23'; Sivertsen (yellow card) 36'; Psyché (yellow card) 46' (goal) 73'; Pemi (yellow card) 51'	Stadium: Haugesund Stadion; Attendance: 200; Referee: Sivert Amland

28 June 2020 4	Sandefjord	0–1	Haugesund	Sandefjord
18:00 CEST (UTC+2)	Rufo (yellow card) 70'	Report	Velde 15'	Stadium: Sandefjord Arena; Attendance: 200; Referee: Tom Harald Hagen

1 July 2020 5	Haugesund	1–0	Start	Haugesund
18:00 CEST (UTC+2)	Källman (yellow card) 37'; Daland 90+4' (o.g.)	Report	Wichne (yellow card) 58'; Daland (yellow card) 90+4'	Stadium: Haugesund Stadion; Attendance: 200; Referee: Usman Aslam

5 July 2020 6	Odd	0–0	Haugesund	Skien
18:00 CEST (UTC+2)		Report	Velde (yellow card) 84'	Stadium: Skagerak Arena; Attendance: 200; Referee: Rohit Saggi

11 July 2020 7	Haugesund	0–3	Molde	Haugesund
18:00 CEST (UTC+2)	Hansen (yellow card) 66'	Report	Andersen 18'; Hussain 29'; Brynhildsen (yellow card) 49'; Aursnes (yellow card) 76'; James 78'	Stadium: Haugesund Stadion; Attendance: 200; Referee: Espen Eskås

15 July 2020 8	Vålerenga	1–0	Haugesund	Oslo
18:00 CEST (UTC+2)	Stokke (yellow card) 25' (goal) 82'	Report	Velde (yellow card) 28'	Stadium: Intility Arena; Attendance: 200; Referee: Sigurd Smehus Kringstad

18 July 2020 9	Haugesund	0–2	Viking	Haugesund
20:30 CEST (UTC+2)	Sandberg (yellow card) 25'; Pedersen (yellow card) 33'; Leite (yellow card) 44'	Report	Ibrahimaj 30' (yellow card) 42'; Bytyqi 80'	Stadium: Haugesund Stadion; Attendance: 200; Referee: Kristoffer Hagenes

26 July 2020 10	Haugesund	1–0	Rosenborg	Haugesund
20:30 CEST (UTC+2)	Sandberg 9' (pen.); Stølås (yellow card) 58'	Report	Reitan (yellow card) 22'; Åsen (yellow card) 63'; Zachariassen (yellow card) 69'; Islamović (yellow card) 89'; Reginiussen (yellow card) 90+3'	Stadium: Haugesund Stadion; Attendance: 200; Referee: Rohit Saggi

29 July 2020 11	Sarpsborg 08	0–0	Haugesund	Sarpsborg
18:00 CEST (UTC+2)	Thomassen (yellow card) 43'	Report	Wadji (yellow card) 38'; Hansen (yellow card) 52'	Stadium: Sarpsborg Stadion; Attendance: 200; Referee: Usman Aslam

2 August 2020 12	Haugesund	3–1	Stabæk	Haugesund
18:00 CEST (UTC+2)	Velde 39', 45+1', 90+4' (pen.); Pedersen (yellow card) 49'; Desler (yellow card) 79'; Stølås (yellow card) 84'	Report	Lumanza (yellow card) 20'; Bohinen 78' (pen.)	Stadium: Haugesund Stadion; Attendance: 200; Referee: Kai Erik Steen

9 August 2020 13	Mjøndalen	1–0	Haugesund	Mjøndalen
18:00 CEST (UTC+2)	Ibrahim 20'; Aasmundsen (yellow card) 69'; Solberg (yellow card) 90+3'	Report		Stadium: Consto Arena; Attendance: 200; Referee: Ola Hobber Nilsen

16 August 2020 14	Haugesund	2–3	Strømsgodset	Haugesund
18:00 CEST (UTC+2)	Hansen (yellow card) 52'; Velde (yellow card) 77'; Ammitzbøll 83'; Vilsvik 90+1' (o.g.)	Report	Hove 9'; Krasniqi (yellow card) 49'; Mickelson (yellow card) 60'; Maigaard 80'; Salvesen 90+2'	Stadium: Haugesund Stadion; Attendance: 200; Referee: Sivert Amland

22 August 2020 15	Aalesund	1–3	Haugesund	Ålesund
18:00 CEST (UTC+2)	Friðjónsson 13'	Report	Leite (yellow card) 22'; Wadji 25'; Sandberg 34' (pen.), 58'	Stadium: Color Line Stadion; Attendance: 200; Referee: Tom Harald Hagen

29 August 2020 16	Haugesund	2–1	Vålerenga	Haugesund
18:00 CEST (UTC+2)	Velde 16' (yellow card) 34'; Wadji 36'	Report	Vilhjálmsson 47' (yellow card) 69'; Bjørdal (yellow card) 74'	Stadium: Haugesund Stadion; Attendance: 200; Referee: Tom Harald Hagen

12 September 2020 17	Stabæk	2–1	Haugesund	Bærum
20:30 CEST (UTC+2)	Hanche-Olsen 12'; Skytte (yellow card) 17'; Solheim (yellow card) 30'; Maatsen 76'	Report	Hanche-Olsen 33' (o.g.); Sandberg (yellow card) 58'; Pedersen (yellow card) 82'	Stadium: Nadderud Stadion; Attendance: 200; Referee: Mohammad Usman Aslam

20 September 2020 18	Rosenborg	2–1	Haugesund	Trondheim
18:00 CEST (UTC+2)	Eyjólfsson (yellow card) 22'; Islamović 50' (yellow card) 90+3'; Hedenstad 80'	Report	Velde 10'; Knudsen (yellow card) 18'	Stadium: Lerkendal Stadion; Attendance: 200; Referee: Ola Hobber Nilsen

27 September 2020 19	Haugesund	4–4	Odd	Haugesund
18:00 CEST (UTC+2)	Fredriksen 5'; Wadji (yellow card) 23'; Leite (yellow card) 34'; Hansen (yellow card) 51'; Sandvik (yellow card) 71'; Kitolano 87' (o.g.); Koné 90'; Ammitzbøll 90+3'	Report	Hoff (yellow card) 36'; Simović 43'; Bakenga 45+1', 71'; Kitolano (yellow card) 45+3'; Ruud 62'	Stadium: Haugesund Stadion; Attendance: 200; Referee: Sigurd Smehus Kringstad

4 October 2020 20	Start	5–1	Haugesund	Kristiansand
18:00 CEST (UTC+2)	Fredriksen 13', 90+1' (o.g.); El Makrini 18'; Kabran (yellow card) 28'; Schulze 33', 60'	Report	Wadji 54'; Ammitzbøll (yellow card) 88'	Stadium: Sør Arena; Attendance: 200; Referee: Kai Erik Steen

18 October 2020 21	Haugesund	2–0	Sarpsborg 08	Haugesund
18:00 CEST (UTC+2)	Stølås (yellow card) 34'; Vetti 44' (o.g.); Velde 47'; Desler (yellow card) 78'	Report	Utvik (yellow card) 23'; Thomassen (yellow card) 43'; Molins (yellow card) 51'; Horn (yellow card) 79'	Stadium: Haugesund Stadion; Attendance: 600; Referee: Mohammad Usman Aslam

27 October 2020 22	Viking	0–1	Haugesund	Stavanger
19:00 CET (UTC+1)	Auklend (yellow card) 73'; Høiland (yellow card) 74'; Østensen (yellow card) 90+4'	Report	Wadji 24' (yellow card) 33'; Leite (yellow card) 75'; Stølås (yellow card) 84'; Knudsen (yellow card) 90+5'	Stadium: Viking Stadion; Attendance: 600; Referee: Espen Eskås
Note: Match originally scheduled for 25 October but postponed on 14 October due to the COVID-19 pandemic.

31 October 2020 23	Haugesund	0–1	Aalesund	Haugesund
20:30 CET (UTC+1)	Sandberg (penalty missed) 61'; Krygård (yellow card) 87' Koné (yellow card) 90+1'	Report	Bizoza (yellow card) 27'; Ólafsson (yellow card) 67'; Castro 75'; Nenass (yellow card) 79'; Nordli (yellow card) 90+2'	Stadium: Haugesund Stadion; Attendance: 600; Referee: Tore Hansen

7 November 2020 24	Brann	1–2	Haugesund	Bergen
20:30 CET (UTC+1)	Strand 61'; Fjóluson (yellow card) 67'	Report	Ahamada 56' (o.g.); Sandberg 66' (pen.); Stølås (yellow card) 75'; Therkildsen (yellow card) 81'; Sandvik (yellow card) 90+3'	Stadium: Brann Stadion; Attendance: 600; Referee: Tom Harald Hagen

22 November 2020 25	Haugesund	3–2	Sandefjord	Haugesund
18:00 CET (UTC+1)	B.Hansen 16'; Koné 33'; Velde (penalty missed) 37' 90'; Leite (yellow card) 64'	Report	K.Hansen 21'; Vega (yellow card) 29'; Haakenstad (yellow card) 37'; Rufo 62' (yellow card) 90+6'; Singh (yellow card) 64' (yellow-red card) 72'	Stadium: Haugesund Stadion; Attendance: 600; Referee: Sivert Amland

29 November 2020 26	Molde	3–1	Haugesund	Molde
18:00 CET (UTC+1)	Hussain 7' (yellow card) 70'; Brynhildsen 12'; Ammitzbøll 48' (o.g.); Eikrem (yellow card) 69'; Knudtzon (yellow card) 89'	Report	Therkildsen 10'; Stølås (yellow card) 40'; Krygård (yellow card) 78'	Stadium: Aker Stadion; Attendance: 600; Referee: Espen Eskås

2 December 2020 26	Haugesund	1–1	Mjøndalen	Haugesund
18:00 CET (UTC+1)	Desler (yellow card) 20'; Velde (yellow card) 40'; Koné (yellow card) 65'; Sandvik (yellow card) 80'; Knudsen 88'	Report	Aasmundsen (yellow card) 17'; Eriksen (yellow card) 61'; Ovenstad (yellow card) 63'; Liseth 67' (yellow card) 74'; Makani (red card) 79'; Vieira (yellow card) 84'	Stadium: Haugesund Stadion; Attendance: 600; Referee: Kai Erik Steen

6 December 2020 28	Strømsgodset	2–2	Haugesund	Drammen
17:00 CET (UTC+1)	Hove 25'; Gunnarsson (yellow card) 61'; Tokstad (yellow card) 80'; Stengel (yellow card) 90'	Report	Therkildsen 69' (yellow card) 88'; Velde (yellow card) 79'; Ammitzbøll 90+1'	Stadium: Marienlyst Stadion; Attendance: 200; Referee: Marius Hansen Grøtta

9 December 2020 29	Haugesund	0–4	Bodø/Glimt	Haugesund
18:00 CET (UTC+1)	Knudsen (yellow card) 60'; Koné (yellow card) 85'	Report	Junker 28' (pen.), 78', 87'; Zinckernagel 31'; Khaykin (yellow card) 60'; Sampsted (yellow card) 68'	Stadium: Haugesund Stadion; Attendance: 600; Referee: Mohammad Usman Aslam

22 December 2020 30	Kristiansund	1–3	Haugesund	Kristiansund
18:00 CET (UTC+1)	Moumbagna 31'; Psyché (yellow card) 82'	Report	Wadji 53', 54', 90+2'; Leite (yellow card) 65'	Stadium: Kristiansund Stadion; Attendance: 600; Referee: Marius Hansen Grøtta

==== Table ====
Pos	Team	Pld	W	D	L	GF	GA	GD	Pts
7	Odd	30	13	4	13	52	51	+1	43
8	Stabæk	30	9	12	9	41	45	−4	39
9	Haugesund	30	11	6	13	39	51	−12	39
10	Brann	30	9	9	12	40	49	−9	36
11	Sandefjord	30	9	8	13	31	43	−12	35

Source: Football Association of Norway (in Norwegian)
Rules for classification: 1) Points; 2) Goal difference; 3) Goals scored; 4) Head-to-head points; 5) Head-to-head goal difference; 6) Head-to-head away goals scored (only if between two teams); 7) Head-to-head goals scored; 8) Play-off (only used to decide champions or relegation).

=== Norwegian Cup ===
2020 First round	–
CEST (UTC+2)
Note: Cup cancelled on 10 September due to the COVID-19 pandemic in Norway.

== Squad statistics ==
As of match played 22 December 2020

=== Appearances and goals ===
No.	Pos	Nat	Player	Total		Eliteserien		Norwegian Cup	
No.	Pos	Nat	Player	Apps	Goals	Apps	Goals	Apps	Goals
1	GK	(Norway) NOR	Helge Sandvik	28	0	28	0	0	0
4	DF	(Norway) NOR	Fredrik Knudsen	16	1	14+2	1	0	0
5	DF	(Denmark) DEN	Benjamin Hansen	29	1	29	1	0	0
6	DF	(Norway) NOR	Joakim Nilsen	15	0	7+8	0	0	0
7	MF	(Norway) NOR	Christian Grindheim	25	0	12+13	0	0	0
8	MF	(Norway) NOR	Kevin Krygård	28	0	17+11	0	0	0
9	FW	(Mali) MLI	Ibrahima Koné	10	2	2+8	2	0	0
10	MF	(Norway) NOR	Niklas Sandberg	24	7	23+1	7	0	0
11	FW	(Denmark) DEN	Alexander Ammitzbøll	27	4	14+13	4	0	0
15	DF	(Norway) NOR	Ulrik Fredriksen	22	1	19+3	1	0	0
16	MF	(Cape Verde) CPV	Bruno Leite	23	0	22+1	0	0	0
17	FW	(Senegal) SEN	Ibrahima Wadji	20	7	19+1	7	0	0
18	MF	(Norway) NOR	Kristoffer Gunnarshaug	10	0	0+10	0	0	0
19	MF	(Denmark) DEN	Mikkel Desler	28	0	28	0	0	0
20	FW	(Denmark) DEN	Oliver Klitten	5	0	1+4	0	0	0
21	DF	(Denmark) DEN	Peter Therkildsen	8	2	6+2	2	0	0
22	DF	(Norway) NOR	Alexander Stølås	23	0	19+4	0	0	0
23	MF	(Norway) NOR	Thore Pedersen	30	0	29+1	0	0	0
32	GK	(Norway) NOR	Frank Stolpe	2	0	2	0	0	0
35	FW	(Norway) NOR	Andreas Endresen	2	0	0+2	0	0	0
99	FW	(Norway) NOR	Kristoffer Velde	28	8	27+1	8	0	0
Players away from Haugesund on loan:
3	DF	(Ivory Coast) CIV	Benjamin Karamoko	3	0	1+2	0	0	0
27	MF	(Norway) NOR	Mads Sande	9	0	2+7	0	0	0
Players who appeared for Haugesund no longer at the club:
9	FW	(Finland) FIN	Benjamin Källman	10	0	9+1	0	0	0

=== Goal scorers ===
Rank	Pos.	No.	Nat.	Player	Eliteserien	Norwegian Cup	Total
1	FW	99	(Norway)	Kristoffer Velde	8	0	8
2	MF	10	(Norway)	Niklas Sandberg	7	0	7
2	FW	17	(Senegal)	Ibrahima Wadji	7	0	7
4				Own goal	6	0	6
5	FW	11	(Denmark)	Alexander Ammitzbøll	4	0	4
6	FW	9	(Mali)	Ibrahima Koné	2	0	2
6	DF	21	(Denmark)	Peter Therkildsen	2	0	2
8	FW	15	(Norway)	Ulrik Fredriksen	1	0	1
8	DF	5	(Denmark)	Benjamin Hansen	1	0	1
8	DF	4	(Norway)	Fredrik Knudsen	1	0	1
TOTALS					39	0	39

=== Clean sheets ===
Rank	Pos.	No.	Nat.	Player	Eliteserien	Norwegian Cup	Total
1	GK	1	(Norway)	Helge Sandvik	7	0	7
TOTALS					7	0	7

=== Disciplinary record ===
No.	Pos.	Nat.	Name	Eliteserien		Norwegian Cup		Total	
No.	Pos.	Nat.	Name	Booked	Sent off (straight red)	Booked	Sent off (straight red)	Booked	Sent off (straight red)
1	GK	(Norway)	Helge Sandvik	3	0	0	0	3	0
4	DF	(Norway)	Fredrik Knudsen	3	0	0	0	3	0
5	DF	(Denmark)	Benjamin Hansen	4	0	0	0	4	0
6	DF	(Norway)	Joakim Nilsen	1	0	0	0	1	0
8	MF	(Norway)	Kevin Krygård	3	0	0	0	3	0
9	FW	(Mali)	Ibrahima Koné	3	0	0	0	3	0
10	MF	(Norway)	Niklas Sandberg	2	0	0	0	2	0
11	FW	(Denmark)	Alexander Ammitzbøll	1	0	0	0	1	0
16	MF	(Cape Verde)	Bruno Leite	7	0	0	0	7	0
17	FW	(Senegal)	Ibrahima Wadji	3	0	0	0	3	0
19	DF	(Denmark)	Mikkel Desler	3	0	0	0	3	0
21	DF	(Denmark)	Peter Therkildsen	2	0	0	0	2	0
22	MF	(Norway)	Alexander Stølås	6	0	0	0	6	0
23	MF	(Norway)	Thore Pedersen	3	0	0	0	3	0
99	FW	(Norway)	Kristoffer Velde	6	0	0	0	6	0
Players who appeared for Haugesund no longer at the club:
9	FW	(Finland)	Benjamin Källman	1	0	0	0	1	0
TOTALS				51	0	0	0	51	0
