= 2026 FK Haugesund season =

Haugesund
2026 season
- Chairman: Christoffer Falkeid
- Head coach: Toni Korkeakunnas (until 9 March); Dennis Horneland & Øyvind Hompland (interim, 9 March–26 April); Endre Eide (from 26 April)
- Stadium: Haugesund Stadion
- 1. divisjon: 3rd
- 2026–27 Norwegian Cup: Pre-season
Home colours	Away colours

The 2026 season is the 33rd season in the history of Fotballklubben Haugesund and the first season for the club in the Norwegian First Division following relegation. In addition, the club will participate in the 2026–27 Norwegian Football Cup.

On 22 April 2026, the club announced the signing of Endre Eide with a 4-year contract.

== Pre-season and friendlies ==
24 January 2026	Haugesund (Norway)	8–1	(Norway) Vard Haugesund

31 January 2026	Haugesund (Norway)	2–2	(Norway) Bjarg

6 February 2026	Haugesund (Norway)	2–2	(Norway) Sotra

17 February 2026	Lillestrøm (Norway)	7–1	(Norway) Haugesund

21 February 2026	Haugesund (Norway)	1–2	(Norway) Kongsvinger

25 February 2026	Haugesund (Norway)	0–2	(Norway) HamKam

4 March 2026	Haugesund (Norway)	5–0	(Norway) Vidar

21 March 2026	Haugesund (Norway)	2–0	(Norway) Egersund

25 March 2026	Viking (Norway)	3–0	(Norway) Haugesund

30 March 2026	Sandnes Ulf (Norway)	2–2	(Norway) Haugesund

== Competitions ==
=== Overall record ===
Competition	First match	Last match	Starting round	Record							
Competition	First match	Last match	Starting round	Pld	W	D	L	GF	GA	GD	Win %
Norwegian First Division	6 April 2026		Matchday 1	28	20	2	6	81	47	+34	71.43
2026–27 Norwegian Football Cup				0	0	0	0	0	0	+0	—
Total				28	20	2	6	81	47	+34	71.43

Source: Competitions

=== First Division ===
Pos	Team	Pld	W	D	L	GF	GA	GD	Pts	Promotion, qualification or relegation
1	Haugesund	28	20	2	6	81	47	+34	62	Promotion to Eliteserien
2	Strømsgodset	28	18	6	4	76	34	+42	60	Promotion to Eliteserien
3	Kongsvinger	28	18	5	5	82	45	+37	59	Qualification for the promotion play-offs third round
4	Stabæk	28	17	4	7	66	34	+32	55	Qualification for the promotion play-offs second round
5	Odd	28	13	6	9	54	43	+11	45	Qualification for the promotion play-offs first round

Updated to match(es) played on 25 October 2026. Source: OBOS-ligaen (in Norwegian)
Rules for classification: 1) Points; 2) Goal difference; 3) Goals scored; 4) Head-to-head points; 5) Head-to-head goal difference; 6) Head-to-head goals scored.

==== Results summary ====
Overall								Home						Away					
Pld	W	D	L	GF	GA	GD	Pts	W	D	L	GF	GA	GD	W	D	L	GF	GA	GD
28	20	2	6	81	47	+34	62	12	1	1	43	15	+28	8	1	5	38	32	+6

Last updated: 25 October 2026.
Source: soccerway

==== Results by round ====
Round	1	2	3	4	5	6	7	8	9	10
Ground	A	H	A	A	H	A	H	A	H	A
Result	W	W	W	L	W	L	D	W	W	W
Position	3	6	1	4	3	6	5	3	3	3

Source: worldfootball
A = Away; H = Home; W = Win; D = Draw; L = Loss

==== Matches ====
The fixtures schedule was released on 19 December 2025.

6 April 2026 1	Lyn	2–4	Haugesund	Oslo
15:30	Diarra 25' (o.g.); Hellum 53'; Kurtovic (yellow card) 56' (yellow-red card) 61'	Report	Diarra 8' 30' 61' (pen.) 87'; Koskela (yellow card) 57'; Nilsen (yellow card) 68'; Leite (yellow card) 69'; Hannola (yellow card) 79'	Stadium: Bislett Stadium; Attendance: 1,768; Referee: (Norway) Jan Tennøy

11 April 2026 2	Haugesund	4–2	Strømsgodset	Haugesund
14:00 CET	Bondhus 50'; Diarra 61' (pen.); Rasmus Møller (yellow card) 74'; Leite (yellow card) 76' (goal) 81'; Eirik Viland Andersen 90+3'	Report	Sørmo (yellow card) 60'; Melkersen 68'; Sebastian Pingel 70'	Stadium: Haugesund Sparebank Aren; Attendance: 4,167; Referee: (Norway) Herman Holthe

18 April 2026 3	Hødd	0–2	Haugesund	Ulsteinvik
14:00 CET	Mirza Mulac (yellow card) 40'; Kallevåg (yellow card) 43'	Report	Diarra 17'; Anders Bondhus (yellow card) 29'; Ismael Camara 71'	Stadium: Nye Høddvoll; Attendance: 1,278; Referee: (Norway) Eirik Wisted

26 April 2026 4	Stabæk	3–2	Haugesund	Bærum
17:00 CET	Magnus Lankhof Dahlby 21'; William Nicolai Wendt (yellow card) 45+4'; Olderheim 54'; Oscar Solnørdal (yellow card) 60'; Matić 90+4' (yellow card) 90+5'	Report	Rasmus Møller (yellow card) 5'; Diarra (yellow card) 20' (goal) 27'; Nilsen (yellow card) 22'; Leite (yellow card) 71'; Bizoza 90'; Anders Bondhus (yellow card) 90+2'	Stadium: Nadderud Stadion; Attendance: 980; Referee: (Norway) Mathias Støfringshaug

1 May 2026 5	Haugesund	2–0	Sandnes Ulf	Haugesund
16:00 CET	Diarra 10' 48'; Bizoza (yellow card) 90+5'	Report	Gullbrandur Øregaard (yellow card) 57'; Ådne Bruseth (yellow card) 68'	Stadium: Haugesund Sparebank Aren; Attendance: 4,086; Referee: (Norway) Anders Bodding

10 May 2026 6	Sogndal	5–1	Haugesund	Sogndalsfjøra
17:00 CET	Pedersen 15'; Pippola 43' 52' 90+1'; Pimenta (yellow card) 69'; Barkarson (yellow card) 86'; Vapne 90+5'	Report	Eirik Viland Andersen 49'; Bizoza (yellow card) 76'	Stadium: Fosshaugane Campus; Attendance: 450; Referee: (Norway) Jan Tennøy

16 May 2026 7	Haugesund	1–1	Åsane	Haugesund
16:00 CET	Diarra 11' (pen.); Anders Bondhus (yellow card) 41'; Solheim (yellow card) 70'	Report	Jesper Eikrem (yellow card) 11'; Barmen 45+3'; Ole Kallevåg (yellow card) 59'; Dennis Møller Wolfe (yellow card) 84'	Stadium: Haugesund Sparebank Aren; Attendance: 4.628; Referee: (Norway) Ali al Hatam

20 May 2026 8	Strømmen	0–7	Haugesund	Lillestrøm
19:00 CET	Nåvik (yellow card) 16'	Report	Diarra 12'; Sandberg 15' 72'; Lars Remmem 27' 75'; Eirik Viland Andersen 46' 67'	Stadium: Strømmen Stadion; Attendance: 347; Referee: (Norway) Mohammad Hafezi

25 May 2026 9	Haugesund	3–1	Moss	Haugesund
17:00 CET	Nilsen (yellow card) 51'; Diarra 64' 73'; Lars Remmem 80'	Report	Kristian Strande (yellow card) 49'; Grønli 52'	Stadium: Haugesund Sparebank Aren; Attendance: 3,008; Referee: (Norway) Steinar Hauge

31 May 2026 10	Raufoss	3–4	Haugesund	Raufoss
17:00 CET	Torjus Engebakken 60'; Rogulj 80' 90+1'; Sebastian Gjelsvik (yellow card) 89'; Jørgen Sjøl (yellow card) 90+2'		Diarra 13' 15' (pen.) 40' (yellow card) 71'; Eirik Viland Andersen 22'	Stadium: Nammo Stadion; Attendance: 784; Referee: (Norway) Herman Holthe

14 June 2026 11	Haugesund	4–1	Ranheim	Haugesund
16:00	Sandberg (yellow card) 5'; Eirik Viland Andersen 6' 52' 71'; Jonas Pereira 13' (o.g.)	Report	Johnsen 8'; Emilsen (yellow card) 38'; Seydina Diop (yellow card) 77'	Stadium: Haugesund Stadion; Attendance: 2,720; Referee: (Norway) Johan Grundt

21 June 2026 12	Egersund	–	Haugesund	Egersund
16:00				Stadium: XL-Bygg Sørvest Arena

27 June 2026 13	Haugesund	–	Kongsvinger	Haugesund
16:00				Stadium: Haugesund Stadion

5 July 2026 14	Odd	v	Haugesund	Skien
16:00				Stadium: Skagerak Arena

25 July 2026 15	Haugesund	v	Bryne	Haugesund
20:00				Stadium: Haugesund Stadion

3 August 2026 16	Ranheim	v	Haugesund	Trondheim
				Stadium: EXTRA Arena

9 August 2026 17	Haugesund	v	Raufoss	Haugesund
				Stadium: Haugesund Stadion

16 August 2026 18	Kongsvinger	v	Haugesund	Kongsvinger
				Stadium: Gjemselund Stadion

26 August 2026 19	Haugesund	v	Egersund	Haugesund
				Stadium: Haugesund Stadion

30 August 2026 20	Bryne	v	Haugesund	Bryne
				Stadium: Bryne Stadion

5 September 2026 21	Haugesund	v	Sogndal	Haugesund
				Stadium: Haugesund Stadion

13 September 2026 22	Moss	v	Haugesund	Moss, Norway
				Stadium: Melløs Stadion

20 September 2026 23	Haugesund	v	Strømmen	Haugesund
				Stadium: Haugesund Stadion

3 October 2026 24	Haugesund	v	Stabæk	Haugesund
				Stadium: Haugesund Stadion

11 October 2026 25	Sandnes Ulf	v	Haugesund	Sandnes
				Stadium: Øster Hus Arena

14 October 2026 26	Haugesund	v	Lyn	Haugesund
				Stadium: Haugesund Stadion

18 October 2026 27	Strømsgodset	v	Haugesund	Drammen
				Stadium: Marienlyst Stadion

25 October 2026 28	Haugesund	v	Hødd	Haugesund
				Stadium: Haugesund Stadion

1 November 2026 29	Åsane	v	Haugesund	Bergen
				Stadium: Åsane Arena

8 November 2026 30	Haugesund	v	Odd	Haugesund
				Stadium: Haugesund Stadion

=== Norwegian Football Cup ===
22–23 August 2026 First round	Vard Haugesund	v	Haugesund
