= Anders Bærtelsen =

Danish footballer (born 2000)

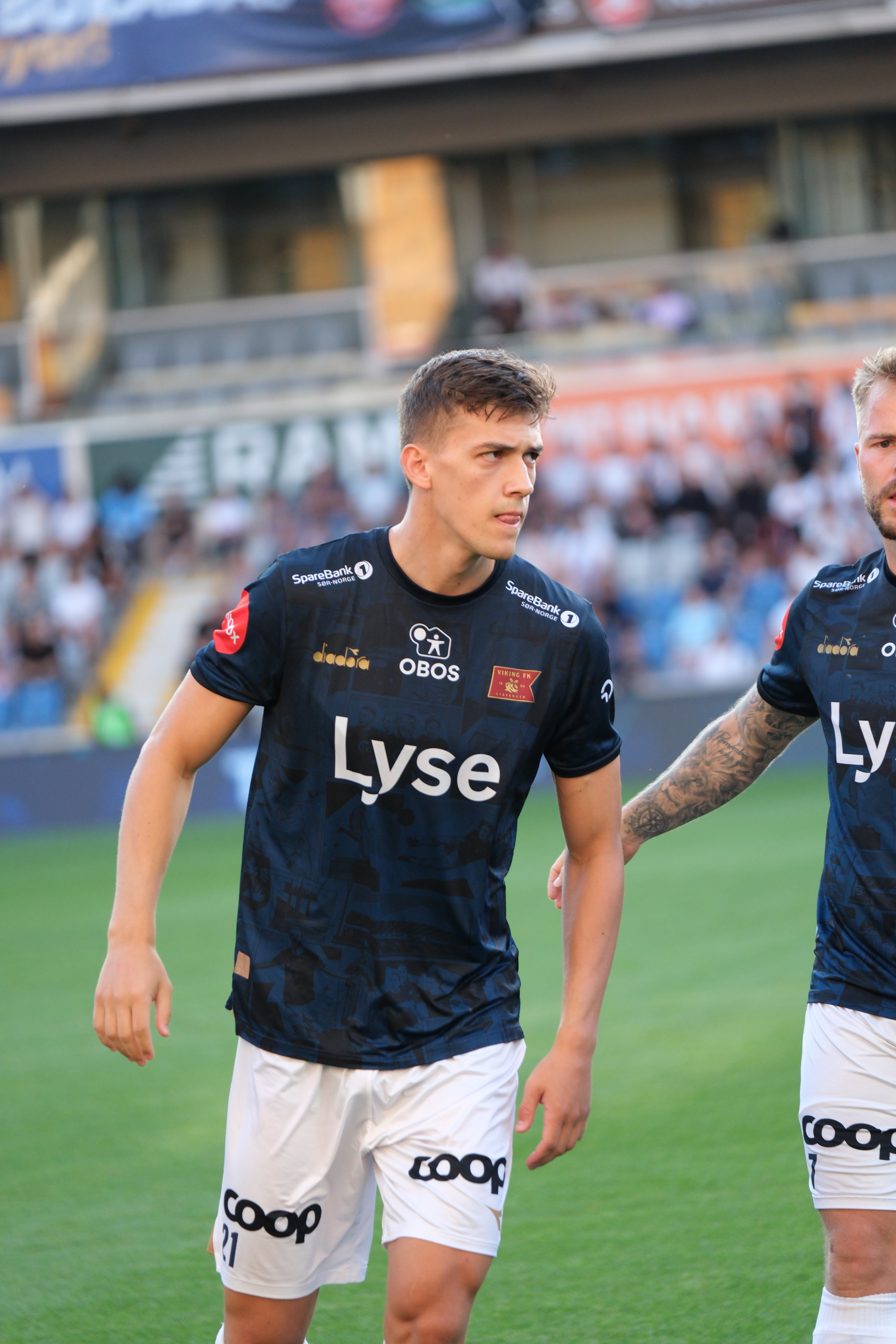
- Bærtelsen with Viking in 2025

Personal information
- Full name: Anders Bloch Bærtelsen
- Date of birth: 9 May 2000 (age 26)
- Place of birth: Aalborg, Denmark
- Height: 1.91 m (6 ft 3 in)
- Position: Centre back

Team information
- Current team: Viking
- Number: 21

Youth career
- Støvring IF
- AaB

Senior career*
| Years | Team | Apps | (Gls) |
| 2018–2020 | AaB | 3 | (0) |
| 2020–2021 | Vendsyssel | 26 | (1) |
| 2021–2025 | Haugesund | 94 | (2) |
| 2025– | Viking | 31 | (2) |

International career
| 2016 | Denmark U16 | 3 | (0) |
| 2016–2017 | Denmark U17 | 12 | (1) |
| 2017–2018 | Denmark U18 | 4 | (0) |
| 2018–2019 | Denmark U19 | 11 | (1) |
- * Club domestic league appearances and goals as of 23 July 2026

Anders Bloch Bærtelsen (born 9 May 2000) is a Danish professional footballer who plays as a centre back for Norwegian Eliteserien club Viking.

== Club career ==
=== AaB ===
Bærtelsen made his first team superliga debut on April 29, 2018, against FC Midtjylland in the Danish Superliga.

In December 2018, Bærtelsen went on a 10-day trial at English club West Bromwich Albion and did well, according to the club. Before they offered him a contract, AaB did, and he agreed and signed a contract until June 2021 starting from the 2019/20 season, where he also would be promoted permanently to the first team squad.

=== Vendsyssel FF ===
On 7 August 2020, Bærtelsen moved to Vendsyssel FF to find more space, signing a four-year deal with the club from the Danish 1st Division.

=== Haugesund ===
After a good season in Vendsyssel, Bærtelsen was sold to Norwegian Eliteserien club Haugesund on 17 August 2021, signing a deal until the end of 2025.

=== Viking ===
On 12 March 2025, Bærtelsen signed for Haugesund's local rivals Viking for an undisclosed fee. He made 21 appearances and scored two goals as Viking won the 2025 Eliteserien.

== Career statistics ==
As of match played 30 November 2025

Appearances and goals by club, season and competition
| Club | Season | League | | | National cup (Note: Includes Danish Cup, Norwegian Cup) | | Other | | Total | |
| Club | Season | Division | Apps | Goals | Apps | Goals | Apps | Goals | Apps | Goals |
|---|---|---|---|---|---|---|---|---|---|---|
| AaB | 2017–18 | Danish Superliga | 1 | 0 | 0 | 0 | — | | 1 | 0 |
| AaB | 2018–19 | Danish Superliga | 0 | 0 | 0 | 0 | — | | 0 | 0 |
| AaB | 2019–20 | Danish Superliga | 2 | 0 | 1 | 0 | — | | 3 | 0 |
| AaB | Total | | 3 | 0 | 1 | 0 | — | | 4 | 0 |
| Vendsyssel | 2020–21 | Danish 1st Division | 22 | 0 | 0 | 0 | — | | 22 | 0 |
| Vendsyssel | 2021–22 | Danish 1st Division | 4 | 1 | 1 | 0 | — | | 5 | 1 |
| Vendsyssel | Total | | 26 | 1 | 1 | 0 | — | | 27 | 1 |
| Haugesund | 2021 | Eliteserien | 10 | 0 | 0 | 0 | — | | 10 | 0 |
| Haugesund | 2022 | Eliteserien | 28 | 0 | 4 | 0 | — | | 32 | 0 |
| Haugesund | 2023 | Eliteserien | 29 | 1 | 2 | 0 | — | | 31 | 1 |
| Haugesund | 2024 | Eliteserien | 27 | 1 | 0 | 0 | 2 (Note: Appearances in Eliteserien play-offs) | 0 | 29 | 1 |
| Haugesund | Total | | 94 | 2 | 6 | 0 | 2 | 0 | 102 | 2 |
| Viking | 2025 | Eliteserien | 21 | 2 | 3 | 0 | 4 (Note: Appearances in UEFA Conference League) | 1 | 28 | 3 |
| Career total | | | 144 | 5 | 11 | 0 | 6 | 1 | 161 | 6 |

== Honours ==
Viking

- Eliteserien: 2025
