= Egil Selvik =

Norwegian footballer (born 1997)

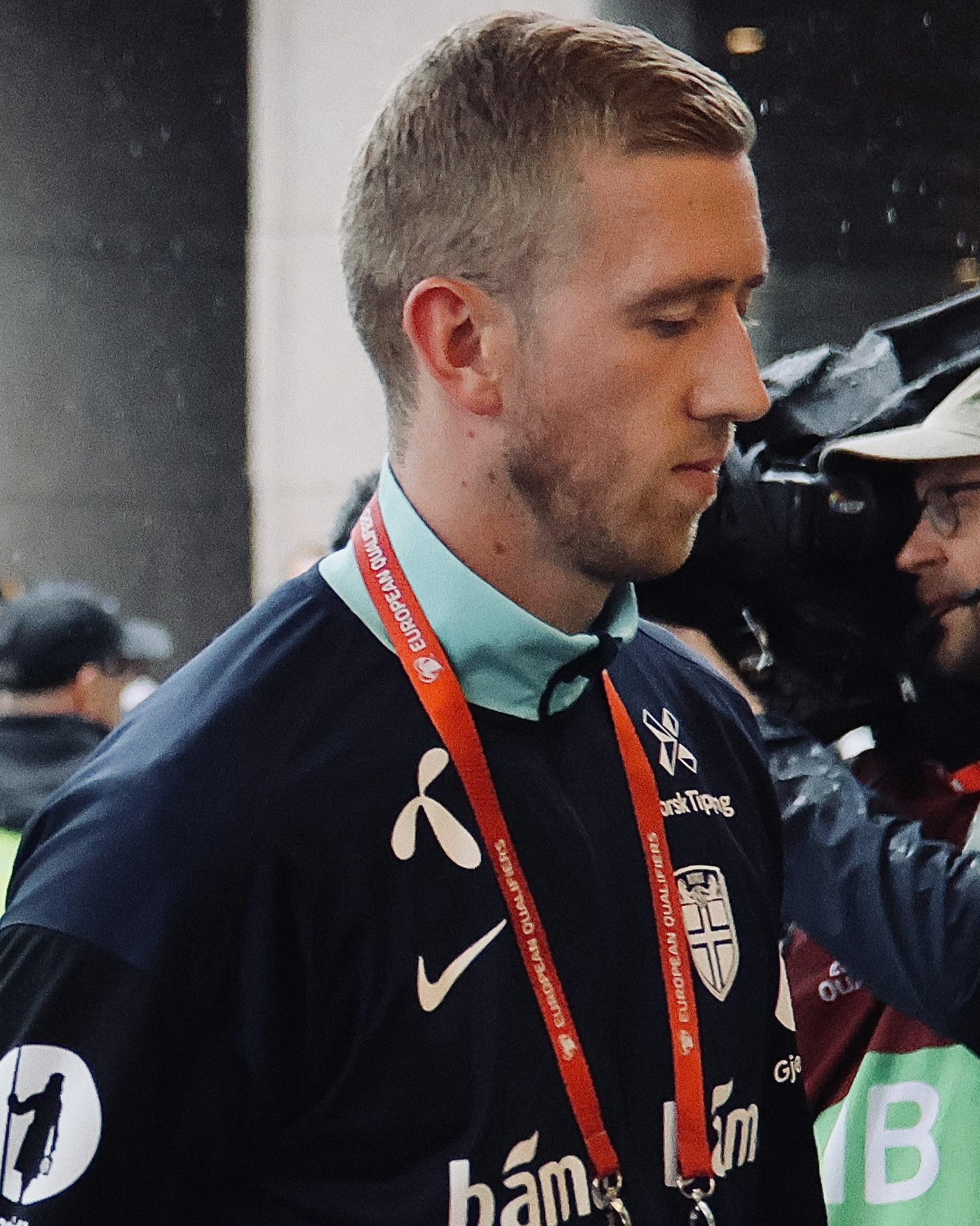
- Selvik with Norway in 2025

Personal information
- Date of birth: 30 July 1997 (age 29)
- Place of birth: Sandnes, Norway
- Height: 1.91 m (6 ft 3 in)
- Position: Goalkeeper

Team information
- Current team: Brest (on loan from Watford)
- Number: 1

Youth career
- –2013: Ganddal IL
- 2014–2016: Sandnes Ulf

Senior career*
Years	Team	Apps	(Gls)
2017–2018	Sandnes Ulf	3	(0)
2018	→ Nest-Sotra (loan)	29	(0)
2019–2020	Odd	1	(0)
2021–2024	Haugesund	117	(0)
2025	Udinese	0	(0)
2025–	Watford	56	(0)
2026–	→ Brest (loan)	11	(0)

International career^{‡}
2016	Norway U19	1	(0)
2023–	Norway	10	(0)
- * Club domestic league appearances and goals as of 22 November 2026 ‡ National team caps and goals as of 14 November 2026

Egil Selvik (born 30 July 1997) is a Norwegian professional footballer who plays as a goalkeeper for Ligue 1 club Brest, on loan from EFL Championship club Watford, and the Norway national team.

== Club career ==
On 25 November 2024, Selvik was sent off for receiving both red and yellow cards in a 5–1 league loss against Viking FK. In his last match for FK Haugesund on 8 December, he kept a clean sheet to seal Haugesund to a 2–0 league victory against FK Moss.

On 10 January 2025, Selvik moved abroad to Italy, signing a contract with Udinese. However, Selvik was only at Udinese for a matter of weeks before moving on to EFL Championship club Watford for an undisclosed fee on 31 January.

== International career ==
Selvik debuted for the Norwegian senior squad on 7 September 2023 in a friendly match against Jordan.

On 21 May 2026, Selvik was included in the 26-man squad selected by Norway national team manager Ståle Solbakken for the 2026 FIFA World Cup.

== Career statistics ==
=== Club ===
As of 22 November 2026

Appearances and goals by club, season and competition
Club	Season	League			National cup		Other		Total	
Club	Season	Division	Apps	Goals	Apps	Goals	Apps	Goals	Apps	Goals
Sandnes Ulf	2017	1. divisjon	3	0	0	0	–		3	0
Nest-Sotra (loan)	2018	1. divisjon	29	0	2	0	1 (Note: Appearance(s) in Eliteserien play-offs)	0	32	0
Odd	2019	Eliteserien	0	0	1	0	—		1	0
Odd	2020	Eliteserien	1	0	—		—		1	0
Odd	Total		1	0	1	0	—		2	0
Haugesund	2021	Eliteserien	29	0	0	0	—		29	0
Haugesund	2022	Eliteserien	30	0	0	0	—		30	0
Haugesund	2023	Eliteserien	29	0	1	0	—		30	0
Haugesund	2024	Eliteserien	29	0	0	0	2	0	31	0
Haugesund	Total		117	0	1	0	2	0	120	0
Watford	2024–25	Championship	16	0	0	0	0	0	16	0
Watford	2025–26	Championship	40	0	1	0	0	0	41	0
Watford	Total		56	0	1	0	0	0	57	0
Brest (loan)	2026–27	Ligue 1	11	0	0	0	0	0	11	0
Career total			217	0	5	0	3	0	225	0

=== International ===
As of 14 November 2026

Appearances and goals by national team and year
National team	Year	Apps	Goals
Norway	2023	2	0
Norway	2024	1	0
Norway	2025	2	0
Norway	2026	5	0
Total		10	0
