= Ismaël Seone =

Burkinabé footballer (born 2005)

Personal information
- Full name: Libo Ismaël Seone
- Date of birth: 26 April 2005 (age 21)
- Place of birth: Ouagadougou, Burkina Faso
- Height: 1.84 m (6 ft 0 in)
- Position: Centre-forward

Team information
- Current team: Haugesund
- Number: 20

Youth career
- –2022: Salitas

Senior career*
Years	Team	Apps	(Gls)
2022–2023	Salitas	0	(0)
2022–2023	→ Vitesse (loan)	29	(13)
2024–	Haugesund	32	(4)
- * Club domestic league appearances and goals as of 14 November 2026

Ismaël Seone (born 26 April 2005) is a Burkinabé professional footballer who plays as a centre-forward for FK Haugesund in Norway.

== Club career ==
Having started playing football in Dédougou, Seone is a youth product of the Salitas FC academy, before being loaned to Vitesse FC, with whom he played in the Burkinabé Premier League.

Seone ended the 2022-23 season with 13 goals, making him the third-top scorer of the league.

== International career ==
Ismaël Seone first received a call up to the Burkina Faso senior team in June 2023, for an Africa Cup of Nations qualifiers game against Cape Verde. Burkina Faso had already secured qualification for the competition, but they are not yet certain of topping their group. Seone was an unused substitute during the 3–1 away defeat to Cape Verde.
