= Thomas Kinn =

Norwegian footballer (born 1999)

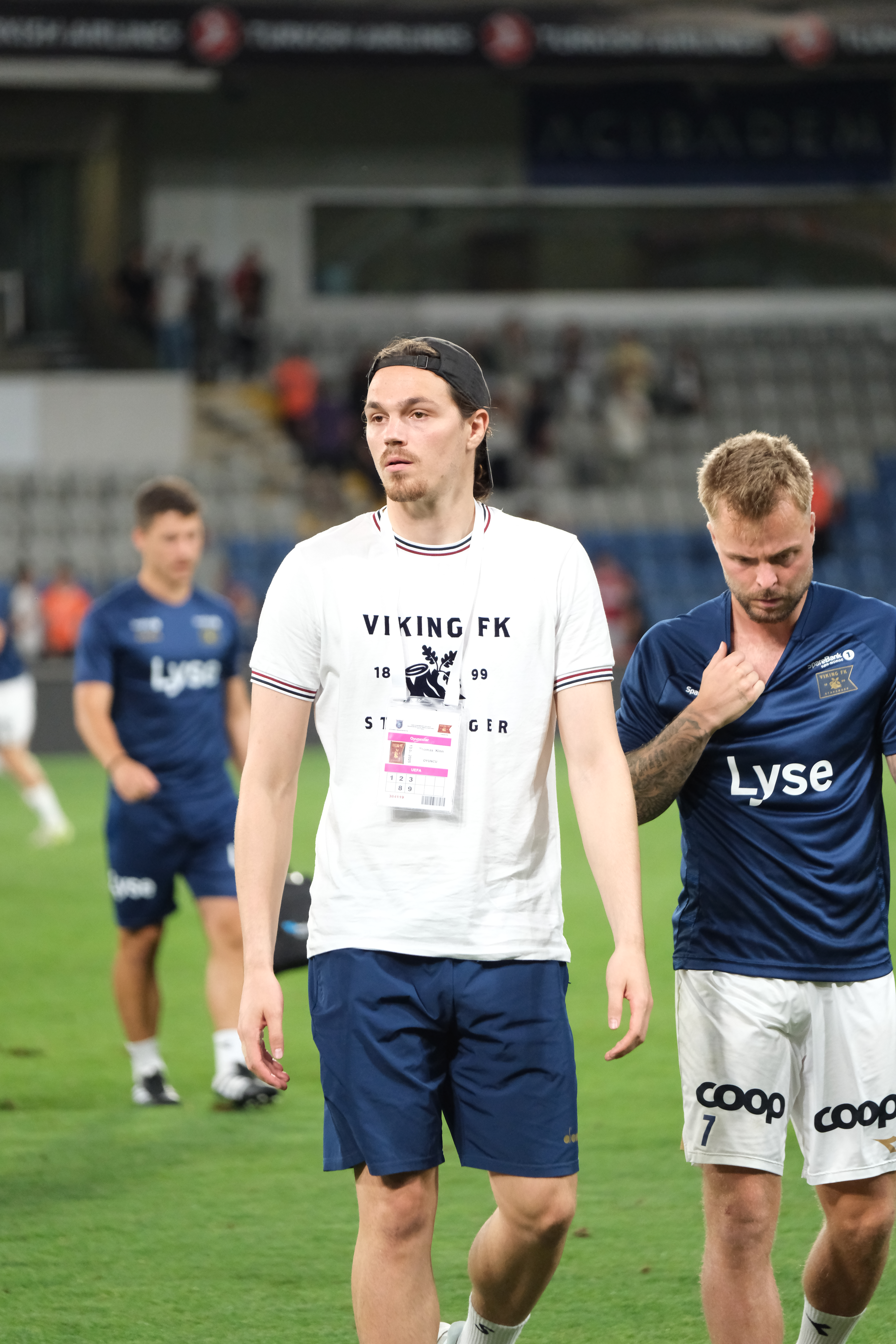
- Kinn with Viking in 2025

Personal information
- Date of birth: 7 February 1999 (age 27)
- Place of birth: Norway
- Height: 1.89 m (6 ft 2 in)
- Position: Goalkeeper

Team information
- Current team: Hødd
- Number: 1

Youth career
- –2009: Sveio
- 2010–2013: Djerv 1919
- 2014–2018: Vard Haugesund

Senior career*
Years	Team	Apps	(Gls)
2014–2016	Vard Haugesund 2	32	(0)
2015–2021	Vard Haugesund	139	(0)
2022–2024	Mjøndalen	89	(0)
2022	Mjøndalen 2	1	(0)
2025	Viking	5	(0)
2025	Viking 2	1	(0)
2025–2026	Oulu	7	(0)
2026–	Hødd	19	(0)

International career
2017	Norway U18	1	(0)
- * Club domestic league appearances and goals as of 14 November 2026

Thomas Kinn (born 7 February 1999) is a Norwegian professional footballer who plays as a goalkeeper for Norwegian First Division club Hødd.

== Club career ==
In February 2025, Kinn joined Eliteserien club Viking.

On 17 August 2025, he joined Veikkausliiga club AC Oulu, as a replacement for injured William Eskelinen.
