= Luděk Vejmola =

Czech footballer

Personal information
- Date of birth: 3 November 1994 (age 32)
- Place of birth: Vyškov, Czech Republic
- Height: 1.86 m (6 ft 1 in)
- Position: Goalkeeper

Youth career
- 1999–2004: Slavkov u Brna
- 2004–2006: Drnovice
- 2006–2007: FKD (Drnovice)
- 2007–2013: Slovácko

Senior career*
Years	Team	Apps	(Gls)
2013–2016	Jihlava	0	(0)
2015	→ Kolín (loan)	6	(0)
2016–2019	Mladá Boleslav	19	(0)
2018–2019	→ Jihlava (loan)	12	(0)
2019–2022	Jihlava	58	(0)
2020–2021	→ Haugesund (loan)	0	(0)
2022	Zápy	9	(0)
2023–2024	Prostějov	27	(0)

International career
2012	Czech Republic U18	2	(0)
2013	Czech Republic U19	2	(0)
2013–2016	Czech Republic U20	5	(0)
2016–2017	Czech Republic U21	3	(0)
- * Club domestic league appearances and goals

Luděk Vejmola (born 3 November 1994) is a Czech former professional footballer who played as a goalkeeper. In February 2025, he retired and became a goalkeeper coach in B-team of FC Zbrojovka Brno.

He made his senior league debut for Kolín on 8 March 2015 in a Czech National Football League 0–0 home draw against Karviná.
