= Anton Logi Lúðvíksson =

Icelandic footballer

Personal information
- Full name: Anton Logi Lúðvíksson
- Date of birth: 13 March 2003 (age 23)
- Place of birth: Kópavogur, Iceland
- Height: 1.88 m (6 ft 2 in)
- Position: Defensive midfielder

Team information
- Current team: Breiðablik
- Number: 13

Youth career
- Breiðablik
- 2020: → SPAL (loan)

Senior career*
Years	Team	Apps	(Gls)
2020–2024	Breiðablik	34	(4)
2021	→ Afturelding (loan)	14	(1)
2024	Haugesund	22	(0)
2025–	Breiðablik	35	(3)

International career^{‡}
2017–2018	Iceland U15	4	(2)
2019	Iceland U16	6	(2)
2019–2020	Iceland U17	7	(0)
2019	Iceland U18	2	(0)
2021–2022	Iceland U19	3	(0)
2022–	Iceland U21	4	(0)
2024–	Iceland	1	(0)
- * Club domestic league appearances and goals as of 1 November 2026 ‡ National team caps and goals as of 31 March 2024

Anton Logi Lúðvíksson (born 13 March, 2003) is an Icelandic football player who plays as a defensive midfielder for Breiðablik and the Iceland national team.

== International career ==
Anton Logi made his debut for the senior Iceland national team on 17 January, 2024 in a friendly against Honduras.
