= Alexander Ammitzbøll =

Danish footballer (born 1999)

Personal information
- Full name: Alexander Ballegaard Ammitzbøll
- Date of birth: 17 February 1999 (age 27)
- Place of birth: Stilling, Denmark
- Height: 1.87 m (6 ft 2 in)
- Position: Forward

Team information
- Current team: Esbjerg
- Number: 23

Youth career
- 2005–2011: Stilling IF
- 2011–2016: FC Skanderborg
- 2016–2017: AGF

Senior career*
Years	Team	Apps	(Gls)
2017–2022	AGF	31	(4)
2020	→ Haugesund (loan)	27	(4)
2022–2025	Aalesund	9	(0)
2026–	Esbjerg	3	(0)

International career
2019	Denmark U20	2	(1)
- * Club domestic league appearances and goals as of 2 June 2026

Alexander Ballegaard Ammitzbøll (born 17 February 1999) is a Danish professional footballer who plays as a forward for Esbjerg.

== Club career ==
=== Early career ===
Ammitzbøll started playing football in a local club called Stilling IF at the age of 6, before him and his family moved to Skanderborg and Ammitzbøll switched to FC Skanderborg as U14 player. In December 2015, at the age of 16, Ammitzbøll was invited to a trial at the Italien club A.C. Milan. He then participated in the talent teams in AGF Club collaboration, since FC Skanderborg and AGF are partner clubs, and in the summer 2016, he then joined the U-19 squad of AGF.

=== AGF ===
Ammitzbøll joined the first team in the pre-season 2017/18 and also played friendly games with them. A year after his arrival, on 13 August 2017, Ammitzbøll got his debut for the first team of AGF. It happened against OB in the Danish Superliga where he started on the bench, but replaced Jakob Ankersen in the 76th minute. At the end of the same month, the player extended his contract for two years.

Since his debut, Ammitzbøll didn't play for the first team in one and a half year, and he continued with the U-19 squad. But in 2019, he began to play more with the first team. After participating in two games for AGF in the beginning of 2019, the club offered him a new contract until the end of 2021 on 14 March 2019, which he signed. On 28 April, he scored his first goal in a 3–1 victory against AC Horsens.

On 7 March 2020 the club confirmed, that Ammitzbøll had been loaned out to FK Haugesund until the end of 2020.

On 16 April 2026, Ammitzbøll signed a contract with Danish 1st Division club Esbjerg FB until the end of the season.

== Career statistics ==
As of match played 2 June 2026

Club	Season	League			Danish Cup		Total	
Club	Season	Division	Apps	Goals	Apps	Goals	Apps	Goals
AGF	2017–18	Danish Superliga	1	0	0	0	1	0
AGF	2018–19	Danish Superliga	9	3	0	0	9	3
AGF	2019–20	Danish Superliga	3	0	2	2	5	2
AGF	2020–21	Danish Superliga	14	1	2	0	16	1
AGF	2020–21	Danish Superliga	4	0	0	0	4	0
Total			31	4	4	2	35	6
Haugesund (loan)	2020	Eliteserien	27	4	0	0	27	4
Total			27	4	0	0	27	4
Aalesund	2022	Eliteserien	9	0	1	0	10	0
Total			9	0	1	0	10	0
Esbjerg FB	2025–26	Eliteserien	3	0	0	0	3	0
Career total			70	8	5	2	75	10
