= Hlynur Freyr Karlsson =

Icelandic footballer (born 2004)

Personal information
- Full name: Hlynur Freyr Karlsson
- Date of birth: 6 April 2004 (age 22)
- Place of birth: Iceland
- Height: 1.75 m (5 ft 9 in)
- Positions: Centre-back; defensive midfielder

Team information
- Current team: Breiðablik (on loan from Brommapojkarna)
- Number: 14

Youth career
- –2021: Breiðablik
- 2020–2021: → Bologna (loan)
- 2021–2023: Bologna

Senior career*
Years	Team	Apps	(Gls)
2020	Breiðablik	1	(0)
2023–2024	Valur	26	(2)
2024	Haugesund	3	(0)
2024–	Brommapojkarna	27	(1)
2026–	→ Breiðablik (loan)	13	(0)

International career^{‡}
2020	Iceland U17	2	(0)
2021–2023	Iceland U19	18	(0)
2023–	Iceland U21	4	(0)
2024–	Iceland	1	(0)
- * Club domestic league appearances and goals as of 1 November 2026 ‡ National team caps and goals as of 17 January 2024

Hlynur Freyr Karlsson (born 6 April 2004) is an Icelandic football player who plays as a defensive midfielder or centre-back for Breiðablik, on loan from Swedish club Brommapojkarna and the Iceland national team. He can also play as a right-back or right midfielder.

== International career ==
Hlynur Freyr represented Iceland at the 2023 UEFA European Under-19 Championship, he was the team's captain.

Hlynur Freyr made his debut for the senior Iceland national team on 17 January 2024 in a friendly against Honduras.

== Career statistics ==
=== Club ===
As of match played 10 November 2024

Appearances and goals by club, season and competition
Club	Season	League			National cup (Note: Includes Icelandic Cup, Norwegian Cup Svenska Cupen)		Continental		Other		Total	
Club	Season	Division	Apps	Goals	Apps	Goals	Apps	Goals	Apps	Goals	Apps	Goals
Breiðablik	2020	Úrvalsdeild	1	0	1	0	0	0	—		2	0
Valur	2023	Úrvalsdeild	26	2	0	0	—		—		26	2
Haugesund	2024	Eliteserien	3	0	0	0	—		0	0	3	0
Brommapojkarna	2024	Allsvenskan	13	0	1	1	—		—		14	1
Career total			43	2	2	1	0	0	0	0	45	3

=== International ===
As of match played 17 January 2024

Appearances and goals by national team and year
National team	Year	Apps	Goals
Iceland	2024	1	0
Total		1	0
