= Oscar Krusnell =

Swedish footballer (born 1999)

Personal information
- Full name: Oscar Krusnell
- Date of birth: 17 February 1999 (age 27)
- Place of birth: Stockholm, Sweden
- Height: 1.83 m (6 ft 0 in)
- Position: Left-back

Team information
- Current team: Sirius
- Number: 22

Youth career
- –2012: Enskede IK
- 2013–2015: AIK
- 2015–2017: Sunderland

Senior career*
Years	Team	Apps	(Gls)
2017–2020	Hammarby IF	5	(0)
2019	→ IK Frej (loan)	3	(0)
2019	→ Team TG FF (loan)	12	(2)
2020	→ IK Frej (loan)	26	(1)
2021–2023	IF Brommapojkarna	50	(3)
2023–2025	FK Haugesund	69	(2)
2025–	Sirius	24	(1)

International career^{‡}
2014–2016	Sweden U17	23	(1)
2017–2018	Sweden U19	7	(0)
- * Club domestic league appearances and goals as of 8 July 2026 ‡ National team caps and goals as of 27 March 2018

Oscar Krusnell (born 17 February 1999) is a Swedish footballer who plays as a left-back for Sirius.

== Early life ==
Krusnell was born in Stockholm and grew up in the borough of Årsta. He started his footballing career as a youngster at local club Enskede IK.

In 2013, at age 14, he joined the youth system of Allsvenskan club AIK. He quickly moved up the ranks and represented the sides U17s, U19s and U21s during the following years. He made his senior debut for AIK in a pre-season friendly ahead of the 2015 Allsvenskan season.

In July 2015, Krusnell signed a three-year deal with Sunderland in Premier League. At age 16, he became the first youth academy player to ever get transferred abroad from AIK. Krusnell joined the club at the same time as fellow countryman Joel Asoro, a forward from Brommapojkarna.

At Sunderland, he settled as a frequent starter in the academy squad. He soon also signed a new youth contract with the club, lasting until June 2019.

During the 2016–17 season, Krusnell featured regularly in the Sunderland U18s, making 22 competitive appearances. Getting known as a well built and versatile player with good feet, Krusnell rotated between several positions, playing either left or centre back as well as making appearances on the left side of midfield.

== Club career ==
=== Hammarby IF ===
On 10 August 2017, Krusnell transferred to Hammarby IF, thus returning to his native country at age 18. Krusnell signed a three-year contract, his first professional deal, with Hammarby and left Sunderland without making any senior appearances. Reports suggested that he moved on a free. Krusnell made his competitive debut on 21 August, coming on as a late sub, in a 3–0 away win against Örebro SK.

Krusnell spent the vast majority of the 2019 season out on loan. First at affiliated club IK Frej in Superettan and then Team TG in Division 1, Sweden's third tier.

In 2020, Krusnell was also sent on loan to IK Frej, and left Hammarby at the end of the year when his contract expired.

=== IF Brommapojkarna ===
On 30 December 2020, Krusnell moved to IF Brommapojkarna in Division 1, the domestic third tier.

=== IK Sirius ===
On 30 July 2025, Krusnell joined IK Sirius on a contract until 2028.

== International career ==
Oscar Krusnell played 23 games for the Swedish national U17 team. He made his debut against Finland on 19 August 2014, in a 1–1 draw. Krusnell scored his only goal for the side in a 3–0 win against Norway in a friendly on 18 September 2014. He was called up to the 2016 UEFA European Under-17 Championship in Azerbaijan, but had to withdraw from the squad due to an injury.

In 2017, Krusnell was called up to the Swedish U19 national team. He made his debut 4–1 friendly win against Hungary on 6 June 2017.
