= Mikkel Hope =

Norwegian footballer (born 2002)

Personal information
- Full name: Mikkel Kalvenes Hope
- Date of birth: 8 August 2006 (age 20)
- Position: Defender

Team information
- Current team: Haugesund
- Number: 25

Youth career
- Trott
- –2020: Stord
- 2021–2023: Haugesund

Senior career*
Years	Team	Apps	(Gls)
2023–	Haugesund	53	(2)
2023–	Haugesund II	25	(3)

International career^{‡}
2022	Norway U16	10	(1)
2023	Norway U17	11	(0)
2024–	Norway U18	11	(0)
2025–	Norway U19	3	(0)
- * Club domestic league appearances and goals as of 14 November 2026 ‡ National team caps and goals as of 3 August 2025

Mikkel Kalvenes Hope (born 8 August 2006) is a Norwegian footballer who plays as a defender for FK Haugesund.

Hope played youth football in IL Trott, and then Stord IL. He was on trials with both FK Haugesund and SK Brann before joining the dominant team in the Haugalandet/Sunnhordland region, FK Haugesund, in 2021. In 2022 he made his debut as a Norway youth international, and was also secured by FK Haugesund by signing a "professional contract".

He made his first-team debut in a friendly match against Wolfsberger AC in Marbella in January 2023. The next step was being officially drafted into the first team, which happened in February 2023. Though Haugesund had a certain history of signing players from Stord, Hope became the first since Torbjørn Agdestein in 2014. At 16 years and 265 days, Hope made his FKH debut as a substitute in April 2023. He became the youngest player ever to represent the club in the league.

His first Eliteserien start came in March 2024, when Haugesund managed to beat Odd away. He went on to start the majority of FKH's games in the 2024 Eliteserien. Among his better matches was a Rogaland derby at home versus Viking, when Haugesund held the medal contenders Viking scoreless, winning 1–0. His first Eliteserien goal came in August 2024 against Bodø/Glimt, though Haugesund lost the game.
