= Claus Niyukuri =

Burundian footballer (born 2000)

Personal information
- Full name: Claus Babo Niyukuri
- Date of birth: 13 February 2000 (age 26)
- Place of birth: Burundi
- Height: 1.82 m (6 ft 0 in)
- Position: Defender

Team information
- Current team: Sarpsborg 08
- Number: 12

Youth career
- –2017: Kopervik

Senior career*
Years	Team	Apps	(Gls)
2017–2019	Kopervik	26	(3)
2020–2022	Vard Haugesund	48	(2)
2023–2026	Haugesund	57	(5)
2026–	Sarpsborg 08	12	(1)

International career^{‡}
2024	Burundi	1	(0)
- * Club domestic league appearances and goals as of 23 July 2026 ‡ National team caps and goals as of 27 August 2024

Claus Babo Niyukuri (born 13 February 2000) is a Burundian professional footballer who plays as a defender for Sarpsborg 08.

== Career ==
Born in Burundi, Niyukuri came to Norway around 2004. His family settling at Haugalandet, Niyukuri played youth football in Kopervik IL and made his senior debut in 2017. In 2019 he was named by Haugesunds Avis as the most surprising local player of the early season. However, this was as low as the 4. divisjon, the fifth tier. He moved up two tiers to SK Vard Haugesund. Following three seasons at Vard, he moved up another two tiers to sign for FK Haugesund ahead of the 2023 season.

Already in the second round of the 2023 Eliteserien, he fell and injured his knee in what initially seemed like a season-ending injury. However, it was discovered that the injury was much less severe. He returned, later scoring his first Eliteserien goal in October 2023, which was Haugesund's winning goal against Aalesund.

In 2024, Niyukuri played regularly during April and May, but struggled with injuries during the summer. He was incapacitated for most of the autumn.

On 22 January 2026, Niyukuri joined Sarpsborg on a contract until 2029.
