= Sory Ibrahim Diarra =

Malian footballer

Sory Diarra
Personal information
- Full name: Sory Ibrahim Diarra
- Date of birth: 28 February 2000 (age 26)
- Place of birth: Ségou, Mali
- Height: 1.87 m (6 ft 2 in)
- Position: Striker

Team information
- Current team: Haugesund
- Number: 29

Youth career
- Étoiles du Mandé

Senior career*
Years	Team	Apps	(Gls)
2017–2018	Étoiles du Mandé		
2018–2019	CO Bamako		
2019–2020	Ceahlăul Piatra Neamț		
2020–2023	Petrolul Ploiești	28	(16)
2021	→ Unirea Slobozia	9	(2)
2023–	Haugesund	101	(51)

International career^{‡}
2024	Mali	1	(0)
- * Club domestic league appearances and goals as of 8 November 2026 ‡ National team caps and goals as of 6 September 2024

Sory Ibrahim Diarra (born 28 February 2000) is a Malian footballer who plays as a striker for Eliteserien club FK Haugesund and the Mali national team.

== Club career ==
Diarra came up through the academy of Étoiles du Mandé.

Diarra joined European football through a transfer to Ceahlăul Piatra Neamț, but then joined Petrolul in 2020. Following a loan to Unirea Slobozia, he showed good form at Petrolul in 2021–22. Diarra became top goalscorer of the 2021–22 Liga II as Petrolul won the league. However, in the summer of 2022 Diarra travelled to Mali amid disagreements in the club. In the winter of 2023, he signed for FK Haugesund in Norway.

== International career ==
Diarra made his debut for the Mali national team on 6 September 2024 in a Africa Cup of Nations qualifier against Mozambique at the Stade du 26 Mars.

== Career statistics ==
As of match played 8 November 2026

Appearances and goals by club, season and competition
Club	Season	Division	League		Cup		Europe		Total	
Club	Season	Division	Apps	Goals	Apps	Goals	Apps	Goals	Apps	Goals
Petrolul Ploiești	2020–21	Liga II	7	1	0	0	–		7	1
Petrolul Ploiești	2021–22	Liga II	21	15	0	0	–		21	15
Petrolul Ploiești	Total		28	16	0	0	–		28	16
Unirea Slobozia (loan)	2020–21	Liga II	9	2	0	0	–		9	2
Unirea Slobozia (loan)	Total		9	2	0	0	–		9	2
Haugesund	2023	Eliteserien	25	8	3	1	–		28	9
Haugesund	2024	Eliteserien	26	5	0	0	–		26	5
Haugesund	2025	Eliteserien	21	7	1	0	–		22	7
Haugesund	2026	OBOS-ligaen	29	31	1	1	–		30	32
Haugesund	Total		101	51	5	2	–		106	53
Career total			138	69	5	2	–		143	71

=== International ===
As of match played 6 September 2024

Appearances and goals by national team and year
National team	Year	Apps	Goals
Mali	2024	1	0
Total		1	0

== Honours ==
Individual

- Norwegian First Division Player of the Month: April 2026
