= 2014 Sandnes Ulf season =

Sandnes Ulf
2014 season
- Chairman: Stig Ravndal
- Manager: Asle Andersen
- Stadium: Sandnes Stadion
- Tippeligaen: 16th (relegated)
- Norwegian Cup: First round vs Sola
- Top goalscorer: League: Diego Rubio (8); All: Diego Rubio (8)
- Highest home attendance: 4,418 vs Viking (22 August 2014)
- Lowest home attendance: 2,330 vs Aalesunds (9 November 2014)
- Average home league attendance: 3,037
| Home colours | Away colours |

The 2014 season is Sandnes Ulf's 3rd season in the Tippeligaen, the top flight of Norwegian football and their ninth season with Asle Andersen as their manager.

== Squad ==
Note: Flags indicate national team as defined under FIFA eligibility rules; some limited exceptions apply. Players may hold more than one non-FIFA nationality.

| No. | Pos. | Nation | Player |
|---|---|---|---|
| 1 | GK | ISL | Hannes Þór Halldórsson |
| 2 | DF | ISL | Eiður Sigurbjörnsson (on loan from Örebro) |
| 3 | DF | SWE | Emil Johansson |
| 4 | MF | FRA | Malaury Martin |
| 5 | DF | SWE | Edier Frejd |
| 6 | DF | NOR | Avni Pepa |
| 7 | MF | NOR | Henrik Furebotn |
| 8 | MF | NOR | Aksel Berget Skjølsvik (captain) |
| 9 | FW | NOR | Marius Helle |
| 10 | FW | CRC | Randall Brenes (on loan from Cartaginés) |
| 11 | FW | CHI | Diego Rubio (on loan from Sporting) |
| 13 | GK | EIR | Sean McDermott |

| No. | Pos. | Nation | Player |
|---|---|---|---|
| 15 | FW | ISL | Hannes Sigurdsson |
| 16 | MF | NOR | Niklas Sandberg |
| 17 | FW | NOR | Ole Kristian Langås |
| 19 | DF | NOR | Vegard Aanestad |
| 20 | MF | GAM | Tijan Jaiteh |
| 21 | MF | KOS | Anel Raskaj |
| 23 | MF | NOR | Erik Tønne |
| 24 | MF | NOR | Fredrik Midtsjø (loan from Rosenborg) |
| 26 | DF | NOR | Kenneth Sola |
| 27 | FW | NOR | Zymer Bytyqi |
| 28 | DF | FRA | Derek Decamps |
| 30 | FW | NOR | Kent Håvard Eriksen |

== Transfers ==
=== Winter ===
In: Note: Flags indicate national team as defined under FIFA eligibility rules; some limited exceptions apply. Players may hold more than one non-FIFA nationality.

| No. | Pos. | Nation | Player |
|---|---|---|---|
| 1 | GK | ISL | Hannes Þór Halldórsson (from (Iceland) KR) |
| 3 | DF | SWE | Emil Johansson (from (Netherlands) Groningen) |
| 4 | MF | FRA | Malaury Martin (from (Switzerland) Lausanne-Sport) |
| 11 | FW | CHI | Diego Rubio (loan from (Portugal) Sporting) |
| 17 | FW | NOR | Ole Kristian Langås (from (Norway) Ull/Kisa) |
| 20 | MF | GAM | Tijan Jaiteh (from (Norway) Sandefjord) |
| 24 | MF | NOR | Fredrik Midtsjø (loan from (Norway) Rosenborg) |
| 28 | DF | FRA | Derek Decamps (from (France) Angers) |
| 30 | FW | NOR | Kent Håvard Eriksen (from (Norway) Elverum) |

Out: Note: Flags indicate national team as defined under FIFA eligibility rules; some limited exceptions apply. Players may hold more than one non-FIFA nationality.

| No. | Pos. | Nation | Player |
|---|---|---|---|
| 1 | GK | NOR | Aslak Falch (to (Norway) Hødd) |
| 2 | DF | SWE | Johnny Lundberg (to (Sweden) Landskrona) |
| 4 | DF | NOR | Nils Petter Andersen (to (Norway) Fløy) |
| 7 | MF | NOR | Fredrik Torsteinbø (to (Sweden) Hammarby) |
| 15 | DF | SRB | Miloš Mihajlov (to (Serbia) Voždovac) |
| 23 | MF | ISL | Steinþór Freyr Þorsteinsson (to (Norway) Viking) |
| 28 | FW | SRB | Nemanja Jovanović (to (Kazakhstan) Spartak Semey) |
| — | DF | NOR | Steffen Haugland (to (Norway) Randaberg) |

=== Summer ===
In: Note: Flags indicate national team as defined under FIFA eligibility rules; some limited exceptions apply. Players may hold more than one non-FIFA nationality.

| No. | Pos. | Nation | Player |
|---|---|---|---|
| 2 | DF | ISL | Eiður Sigurbjörnsson (on loan from (Sweden) Örebro) |
| 10 | FW | CRC | Randall Brenes (on loan from (Costa Rica) Cartaginés) |
| 15 | FW | ISL | Hannes Sigurdsson (from (Austria) Grödig) |

Out: Note: Flags indicate national team as defined under FIFA eligibility rules; some limited exceptions apply. Players may hold more than one non-FIFA nationality.

| No. | Pos. | Nation | Player |
|---|---|---|---|
| 10 | FW | SCO | Steven Lennon (to (Iceland) FH) |
| 36 | FW | NOR | Birk Risa (to (Germany) Köln) |

== Competitions ==
=== Tippeligaen ===
==== Results summary ====
| Overall | | | | | | | | Home | | | | | | Away | | | | | |
| Pld | W | D | L | GF | GA | GD | Pts | W | D | L | GF | GA | GD | W | D | L | GF | GA | GD |
|---|---|---|---|---|---|---|---|---|---|---|---|---|---|---|---|---|---|---|---|
| 30 | 4 | 10 | 16 | 27 | 53 | −26 | 22 | 4 | 5 | 6 | 14 | 20 | −6 | 0 | 5 | 10 | 13 | 33 | −20 |

==== Results by round ====
| Round | 1 | 2 | 3 | 4 | 5 | 6 | 7 | 8 | 9 | 10 | 11 | 12 | 13 | 14 | 15 | 16 | 17 | 18 | 19 | 20 | 21 | 22 | 23 | 24 | 25 | 26 | 27 | 28 | 29 | 30 |
|---|---|---|---|---|---|---|---|---|---|---|---|---|---|---|---|---|---|---|---|---|---|---|---|---|---|---|---|---|---|---|
| Ground | H | A | H | A | H | H | A | H | A | H | A | H | A | A | H | A | H | A | H | A | H | A | H | A | H | A | H | A | A | H |
| Result | D | L | D | L | L | W | L | L | D | D | L | W | L | L | L | L | L | L | D | D | D | D | L | D | W | L | W | L | D | L |
| Position | 12 | 14 | 14 | 15 | 16 | 13 | 14 | 16 | 15 | 15 | 16 | 13 | 15 | 16 | 16 | 16 | 16 | 16 | 16 | 16 | 16 | 16 | 16 | 16 | 16 | 16 | 16 | 16 | 16 | 16 |

Updated to match(es) played on 10 November 2014. Source: see below
A = Away; H = Home; W = Win; D = Draw; L = Loss

==== Results ====
| 30 March 2014 1 | Sandnes Ulf | 1–1 | Odd | Sandnes |
| 18:00 CEST (UTC+2) | Lennon 75' | Summary | Johnsen 85' | Stadium: Sandnes Idrettspark; Attendance: 3,506; Referee: Ola Hobber Nilsen |

| 6 April 2014 2 | Lillestrøm | 4–1 | Sandnes Ulf | Lillestrøm |
| 18:00 CEST (UTC+2) | Moen (pen.), 45'; Pálmason 58'; Halldórsson 78' (o.g.); Omoijuanfo 90' | Summary | Skjølsvik (yellow card) 40' (yellow-red card) 77'; Rubio 67' | Stadium: Åråsen Stadion; Attendance: 5,127; Referee: Tom Harald Hagen |

| 11 April 2014 3 | Sandnes Ulf | 1–1 | Brann | Sandnes |
| 19:00 CEST (UTC+2) | Rubio 9' | Summary | Larsen 81' | Stadium: Sandnes Idrettspark; Attendance: 3,292; Referee: Svein Edvartsen |

| 21 April 2014 4 | Vålerenga | 3–0 | Sandnes Ulf | Oslo |
| 15:30 CEST (UTC+2) | Kjartansson 45+1'; R.Lindkvist 59'; Gunnarsson 61' | Summary | | Stadium: Ullevaal Stadion; Attendance: 9,092; Referee: Kristoffer Helgerud |

| 27 April 2014 5 | Sandnes Ulf | 1–3 | Molde | Sandnes |
| 18:00 CEST (UTC+2) | Forren 83' (o.g.) | Summary | Moström 14'; Gulbrandsen 43'; Elyounoussi 90' | Stadium: Sandnes Idrettspark; Attendance: 3,050; Referee: Ken Henry Johnsen |

| 30 April 2014 6 | Sandnes Ulf | 2–1 | Stabæk | Sandnes |
| 19:00 CEST (UTC+2) | Midtsjø 9'; Rubio 76' | Summary | Boli 62' | Stadium: Sandnes Idrettspark; Attendance: 2,644; Referee: Andres Johansen |

| 4 May 2014 7 | Sarpsborg 08 | 2–1 | Sandnes Ulf | Sarpsborg |
| 15:30 CEST (UTC+2) | Berthod 39'; Hansen (red card) 67'; Samuel 75' | Summary | Midtsjø 15' | Stadium: Sarpsborg Stadion; Attendance: 3,800; Referee: Dag Vidar Hafsås |

| 12 May 2014 8 | Sandnes Ulf | 0–2 | Rosenborg | Sandnes |
| 19:00 CEST (UTC+2) | | Summary | Søderlund 1'; Mikkelsen 61' | Stadium: Sandnes Idrettspark; Attendance: 3 290; Referee: Ola Hobber Nilsen |

| 16 May 2014 9 | Viking | 2–2 | Sandnes Ulf | Stavanger |
| 18:00 CEST (UTC+2) | Nisja 57', 71' | Summary | Lennon 14'; Rubio 48' | Stadium: Viking Stadion; Attendance: 16,508; Referee: Tore Hansen |

| 20 May 2014 10 | Sandnes Ulf | 0–0 | Haugesund | Sandnes |
| 18:00 CEST (UTC+2) | | Summary | | Stadium: Sandnes Idrettspark; Attendance: 2,905; Referee: Trond Ivar Døvle |

| 25 May 2014 11 | Sogndal | 1–0 | Sandnes Ulf | Sogndalsfjøra |
| 18:00 CEST (UTC+2) | Nilsen 90+3' | Summary | Rubio (yellow card) 79' (yellow-red card) 85' | Stadium: Fosshaugane Campus; Attendance: 2,827; Referee: Espen Berntsen |

| 9 June 2014 12 | Sandnes Ulf | 1–0 | Bodø/Glimt | Sandnes |
| 18:00 CEST (UTC+2) | Langås 16' | Summary | | Stadium: Sandnes Idrettspark; Attendance: 2,910; Referee: Trygve Kjensli |

| 12 June 2014 13 | Aalesund | 3–0 | Sandnes Ulf | Ålesund |
| 19:00 CEST (UTC+2) | Aarøy 34'; Ulvestad 55'; James 63' | Summary | Jaiteh (yellow card) 16' | Stadium: Color Line Stadion; Attendance: 6,703; Referee: Per Ivar Staberg |

| 6 July 2014 14 | Strømsgodset | 1–0 | Sandnes Ulf | Drammen |
| 15:30 CEST (UTC+2) | Hamoud 76' | Summary | | Stadium: Marienlyst Stadion; Attendance: 5,861; Referee: Trygve Kjensli |

| 12 July 2014 15 | Sandnes Ulf | 1–2 | Start | Sandnes |
| 18:00 CEST (UTC+2) | Rubio 80' | Summary | Vilhjálmsson 4', 15' | Stadium: Sandnes Idrettspark; Attendance: 2,674; Referee: Ola Hobber Nilsen |

| 20 July 2014 16 | Molde | 3–1 | Sandnes Ulf | Molde |
| 15:30 CEST (UTC+2) | Høiland 27', 64', 73' | Summary | Midtsjø 5'; Skjølsvik (yellow card) 25' (yellow-red card) 62' | Stadium: Aker Stadion; Attendance: 8,821; Referee: Anders Johansen |

| 26 July 2014 17 | Sandnes Ulf | 1–3 | Strømsgodset | Sandnes |
| 18:00 CEST (UTC+2) | Furebotn 19' | Summary | Ødegaard 12'; Wikheim 83'; Sørum 84' | Stadium: Sandnes Idrettspark; Attendance: 3,210; Referee: Trond Ivar Døvle |

| 3 August 2014 18 | Odd | 3–1 | Sandnes Ulf | Skien |
| 15:30 CEST (UTC+2) | Johnsen 52'; Jensen 66'; Shala 90+1' | Summary | Midtsjø 47' | Stadium: Skagerak Arena; Attendance: 5,556; Referee: Espen Berntsen |

| 10 August 2014 19 | Sandnes Ulf | 0–0 | Lillestrøm | Sandnes |
| 18:00 CEST (UTC+2) | | Summary | | Stadium: Sandnes Idrettspark; Attendance: 2,841; Referee: Per Ivar Staberg |

| 17 August 2014 20 | Bodø/Glimt | 1–1 | Sandnes Ulf | Bodø |
| 18:00 CEST (UTC+2) | Ndiaye 85' | Summary | Brenes 55' | Stadium: Aspmyra Stadion; Attendance: 3,304; Referee: Trygve Kjensli |

| 22 August 2014 25 | Sandnes Ulf | 2–2 | Viking | Sandnes |
| 19:00 CEST (UTC+2) | Brenes 39', 53' | Summary | Þorsteinsson 41'; Sverrisson 80' | Stadium: Sandnes Idrettspark; Attendance: 4,418; Referee: Andres Johansen |

| 31 August 2014 22 | Stabæk | 1–1 | Sandnes Ulf | Bærum |
| 18:00 CEST (UTC+2) | Sortevik 80' | Summary | Furebotn 32' | Stadium: Nadderud Stadion; Attendance: 3,383; Referee: Tore Hansen |

| 14 September 2014 23 | Sandnes Ulf | 0–2 | Sarpsborg 08 | Sandnes |
| 15:30 CEST (UTC+2) | | Summary | Þórarinsson 26'; Tokstad 40' | Stadium: Sandnes Idrettspark; Attendance: 3,671; Referee: Tom Harald Hagen |

| 19 September 2014 24 | Brann | 1–1 | Sandnes Ulf | Bergen |
| 19:00 CEST (UTC+2) | Askar 63' | Summary | Sigurbjörnsson 52' | Stadium: Brann Stadion; Attendance: 13,140; Referee: Trygve Kjensli |

| 26 September 2014 25 | Sandnes Ulf | 2–1 | Vålerenga | Sandnes |
| 19:00 CEST (UTC+2) | Rubio 55' (pen.), 60' | Summary | Grindheim 61' | Stadium: Sandnes Idrettspark; Attendance: 2,388; Referee: Dag Vidar Hafsås |

| 5 October 2014 26 | Haugesund | 2–0 | Sandnes Ulf | Haugesund |
| 18:00 CEST (UTC+2) | Sema 56'; Bamberg 77' | Summary | | Stadium: Haugesund Stadion; Attendance: 6,009; Referee: Brage Sandmoen |

| 19 October 2014 27 | Sandnes Ulf | 1–0 | Sogndal | Sandnes |
| 18:00 CEST (UTC+2) | Utvik 31' (o.g.) | Summary | | Stadium: Sandnes Idrettspark; Attendance: 2,428; Referee: Trygve Kjensli |

| 26 October 2014 28 | Rosenborg | 3–1 | Sandnes Ulf | Trondheim |
| 15:30 CET (UTC+1) | Jensen 35'; Helland 44'; Mikkelsen 58' | Summary | Skjølsvik 79' | Stadium: Lerkendal Stadion; Attendance: 13,457; Referee: Omar Rafiq |

| 2 November 2014 29 | Start | 3–3 | Sandnes Ulf | Kristiansand |
| 18:00 CET (UTC+1) | Kristjánsson 45+2'; Acosta 90+3'; Salvesen 90+4' | Summary | Frejd 12'; Midtsjø 39'; Brenes 47' | Stadium: Sør Arena; Attendance: 4,768; Referee: Kristoffer Helgerud |

| 9 November 2014 30 | Sandnes Ulf | 1–2 | Aalesund | Sandnes |
| 18:00 CET (UTC+1) | Rubio 12' | Summary | Barrantes 74'; Mattila 90+1' | Stadium: Sandnes Idrettspark; Attendance: 2,330; Referee: Brage Sandmoen |

==== Table ====
| Pos | Team | Pld | W | D | L | GF | GA | GD | Pts | Qualification or relegation |
|---|---|---|---|---|---|---|---|---|---|---|
| 12 | Start | 30 | 10 | 5 | 15 | 47 | 60 | −13 | 35 | |
| 13 | Bodø/Glimt | 30 | 10 | 5 | 15 | 45 | 60 | −15 | 35 | |
| 14 | Brann (R) | 30 | 8 | 5 | 17 | 41 | 54 | −13 | 29 | Qualification for the relegation play-offs |
| 15 | Sogndal (R) | 30 | 6 | 6 | 18 | 31 | 49 | −18 | 24 | Relegation to First Division |
| 16 | Sandnes Ulf (R) | 30 | 4 | 10 | 16 | 27 | 53 | −26 | 22 | Relegation to First Division |

Source: fotball.no
Rules for classification: 1) points; 2) goal difference; 3) number of goals scored.
(R) Relegated

=== Norwegian Cup ===
| 24 April 2014 First Round | Sola | 1–0 | Sandnes Ulf | Sola |
| 18:00 CEST (UTC+2) | Eriksen 29' | Summary | | Stadium: Sola Stadion; Attendance: 650; Referee: Cosmin Dima |

== Squad statistics ==
As of match played 9 November 2014

=== Appearances and goals ===
| No. | Pos | Nat | Player | Total | | Tippeligaen | | Norwegian Cup | |
| No. | Pos | Nat | Player | Apps | Goals | Apps | Goals | Apps | Goals |
|---|---|---|---|---|---|---|---|---|---|
| 1 | GK | (Iceland) ISL | Hannes Þór Halldórsson | 31 | 0 | 30 | 0 | 1 | 0 |
| 2 | DF | (Iceland) ISL | Eiður Sigurbjörnsson | 8 | 1 | 8 | 1 | 0 | 0 |
| 4 | MF | (France) FRA | Malaury Martin | 6 | 0 | 5 | 0 | 1 | 0 |
| 5 | DF | (Sweden) SWE | Edier Frejd | 22 | 1 | 21+1 | 1 | 0 | 0 |
| 6 | DF | (Kosovo) KOS | Avni Pepa | 12 | 0 | 8+3 | 0 | 1 | 0 |
| 7 | MF | (Norway) NOR | Henrik Furebotn | 24 | 0 | 24 | 0 | 0 | 0 |
| 8 | MF | (Norway) NOR | Aksel Berget Skjølsvik | 23 | 1 | 18+5 | 1 | 0 | 0 |
| 9 | FW | (Norway) NOR | Marius Helle | 25 | 0 | 11+13 | 0 | 0+1 | 0 |
| 10 | FW | (Costa Rica) CRC | Randall Brenes | 11 | 4 | 11 | 4 | 0 | 0 |
| 11 | FW | (Chile) CHI | Diego Rubio | 27 | 8 | 19+7 | 8 | 0+1 | 0 |
| 15 | FW | (Iceland) ISL | Hannes Sigurdsson | 10 | 0 | 9+1 | 0 | 0 | 0 |
| 16 | MF | (Norway) NOR | Niklas Sandberg | 4 | 0 | 1+3 | 0 | 0 | 0 |
| 17 | FW | (Norway) NOR | Ole Kristian Langås | 16 | 0 | 8+7 | 0 | 1 | 0 |
| 19 | DF | (Norway) NOR | Vegard Aanestad | 23 | 0 | 18+4 | 0 | 1 | 0 |
| 20 | MF | (The Gambia) GAM | Tijan Jaiteh | 25 | 0 | 19+5 | 0 | 1 | 0 |
| 21 | MF | (Kosovo) KOS | Anel Raskaj | 27 | 0 | 21+5 | 0 | 1 | 0 |
| 23 | MF | (Norway) NOR | Erik Tønne | 26 | 0 | 22+3 | 0 | 1 | 0 |
| 24 | MF | (Norway) NOR | Fredrik Midtsjø | 28 | 1 | 18+10 | 1 | 0 | 0 |
| 25 | DF | (Norway) NOR | Vegard Skjørestad | 2 | 0 | 1+1 | 0 | 0 | 0 |
| 26 | DF | (Norway) NOR | Kenneth Sola | 16 | 0 | 14+2 | 0 | 0 | 0 |
| 27 | FW | (Norway) NOR | Zymer Bytyqi | 8 | 0 | 0+7 | 0 | 1 | 0 |
| 28 | DF | (France) FRA | Derek Decamps | 28 | 0 | 27 | 0 | 1 | 0 |
| 30 | FW | (Norway) NOR | Kent Håvard Eriksen | 11 | 0 | 2+8 | 0 | 1 | 0 |
Players away from Sandnes Ulf on loan:
Players who appeared for Sandnes Ulf no longer at the club:
| 10 | MF | (Scotland) SCO | Steven Lennon | 16 | 0 | 15 | 0 | 0+1 | 0 |

=== Goal Scorers ===
| Place | Position | Nation | Number | Name | Tippeligaen | Norwegian Cup | Total |
|---|---|---|---|---|---|---|---|
| 1 | FW | (Chile) | 11 | Diego Rubio | 8 | 0 | 8 |
| 2 | MF | (Norway) | 24 | Fredrik Midtsjø | 4 | 0 | 4 |
| 2 | FW | (Costa Rica) | 10 | Randall Brenes | 4 | 0 | 4 |
| 4 | MF | (Scotland) | 10 | Steven Lennon | 2 | 0 | 2 |
| 4 | MF | (Norway) | 7 | Henrik Furebotn | 2 | 0 | 2 |
| 4 | | | | Own goal | 2 | 0 | 2 |
| 7 | FW | (Norway) | 17 | Ole Kristian Langås | 1 | 0 | 1 |
| 7 | DF | (Iceland) | 2 | Eiður Sigurbjörnsson | 1 | 0 | 1 |
| 7 | MF | (Norway) | 8 | Aksel Berget Skjølsvik | 1 | 0 | 1 |
| 7 | DF | (Sweden) | 5 | Edier Frejd | 1 | 0 | 1 |
| 7 | MF | (Norway) | 24 | Fredrik Midtsjø | 1 | 0 | 1 |
| | | | | TOTALS | 27 | 0 | 27 |

=== Disciplinary record ===
| Number | Nation | Position | Name | Tippeligaen | | Norwegian Cup | | Total | |
| Number | Nation | Position | Name | Yellow card | Red card | Yellow card | Red card | Yellow card | Red card |
| 2 | (Iceland) | DF | Eiður Sigurbjörnsson | 1 | 0 | 0 | 0 | 1 | 0 |
| 4 | (France) | MF | Malaury Martin | 2 | 0 | 0 | 0 | 2 | 0 |
| 5 | (Sweden) | DF | Edier Frejd | 1 | 0 | 0 | 0 | 1 | 0 |
| 7 | (Norway) | MF | Henrik Furebotn | 2 | 0 | 0 | 0 | 2 | 0 |
| 8 | (Norway) | MF | Aksel Berget Skjølsvik | 4 | 2 | 0 | 0 | 4 | 2 |
| 9 | (Norway) | FW | Marius Helle | 1 | 0 | 0 | 0 | 1 | 0 |
| 10 | (Scotland) | MF | Steven Lennon | 1 | 0 | 0 | 0 | 1 | 0 |
| 11 | (Chile) | FW | Diego Rubio | 5 | 1 | 0 | 0 | 5 | 1 |
| 15 | (Iceland) | FW | Hannes Sigurdsson | 2 | 0 | 0 | 0 | 2 | 0 |
| 16 | (Norway) | MF | Niklas Sandberg | 1 | 0 | 0 | 0 | 1 | 0 |
| 19 | (Norway) | DF | Vegard Aanestad | 2 | 0 | 0 | 0 | 2 | 0 |
| 20 | (The Gambia) | MF | Tijan Jaiteh | 8 | 0 | 0 | 0 | 8 | 0 |
| 21 | (Kosovo) | MF | Anel Raskaj | 5 | 0 | 0 | 0 | 5 | 0 |
| 24 | (Norway) | MF | Fredrik Midtsjø | 4 | 0 | 0 | 0 | 4 | 0 |
| 26 | (Norway) | DF | Kenneth Sola | 2 | 0 | 0 | 0 | 2 | 0 |
| 28 | (France) | DF | Derek Decamps | 5 | 0 | 0 | 0 | 5 | 0 |
| | | | TOTALS | 46 | 3 | 0 | 0 | 46 | 3 |
