= 2019 Norwegian Football Cup =

Tournament details
- Country: Norway
- Teams: 272 (overall); 128 (main competition)

Final positions
- Champions: Viking (6th title)
- Runners-up: Haugesund

Tournament statistics
- Matches played: 127
- Goals scored: 509 (4.01 per match)
- Top goal scorer(s): Martin Samuelsen (7 goals)

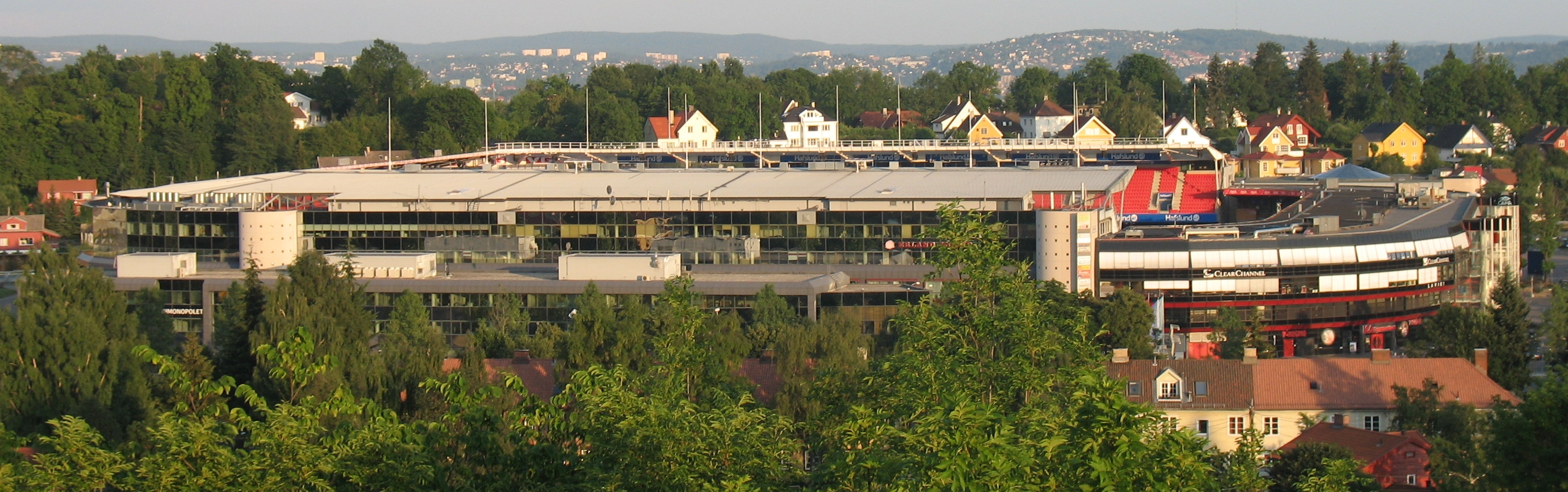
Ullevaal Stadion, Oslo - venue for the Norwegian Cup final

The 2019 Norwegian Football Cup was the 114th season of the Norwegian annual knock-out football tournament. It began with qualification matches in March and April 2019. The first round was played on 1 May 2019 and the tournament concluded with the final on 8 December 2019.

Viking won their sixth Cup title and qualified for the Europa League second qualifying round.

== Calendar ==
Below are the dates for each round as given by the official schedule:

Round	Main date	Number of fixtures	Clubs
First Qualifying Round	9–24 March 2019	96	272 → 176
Second Qualifying Round	29 March – 12 April 2019	48	176 → 128
First Round	1 May 2019	64	128 → 64
Second Round	22 May 2019	32	64 → 32
Third Round	19 June 2019	16	32 → 16
Fourth Round	26 June 2019	8	16 → 8
Quarter-finals	25–26 September 2019	4	8 → 4
Semi-finals	30–31 October 2019	2	4 → 2
Final	8 December 2019	1	2 → 1

== First round ==
Number of teams per tier entering this round
Eliteserien (1)	1. divisjon (2)	2. divisjon (3)	3. divisjon (4)	4. divisjon (5)	Total
16 / 16	16 / 16	27 / 28	48 / 84	21 / 298	128 / 442

30 April 2019	Fjøra (4)	2–2 (a.e.t.) (4–5 p)	(3) Florø	Sogndal
20:00 CEST (UTC+2)	Gjerde 78'; Bjelde 120'	Report	Dyer 25', 106'	Stadium: Fosshaugane Campus; Referee: Elias Åsebø
	Penalties
	Bjelde (penalty scored); Olsen (penalty missed); Gjerde (penalty missed); Loftesnes (penalty missed); Knutsen (penalty scored); Gjøringbø (penalty scored); Årdal (penalty scored); Jensen (penalty scored)		(penalty missed) Unknown; (penalty scored) Nissen; (penalty missed) Dyer; (penalty missed) Wennberg; (penalty scored) Husa; (penalty scored) Fleten; (penalty scored) Høydal; (penalty scored) Aarønes

1 May 2019	Nordstrand (4)	0–1	(2) KFUM Oslo	Oslo
15:00 CEST (UTC+2)		Report	Troudart 90'	Stadium: Nordstrand Kunstgress; Attendance: 783; Referee: Marius Bye

1 May 2019	Oppsal (3)	3–5	(4) Ullern	Oslo
15:00 CEST (UTC+2)	Bjørseth 9', 11' (pen.); Loulanti 45' (pen.)	Report	Stender 58'; Austnes 63'; Jor 74', 78', 81'	Stadium: KFUM Arena; Attendance: 171; Referee: Herman Holthe

1 May 2019	FK Tønsberg (4)	0–2	(2) Sandefjord	Tønsberg
15:00 CEST (UTC+2)		Report	Ofkir 4'; Jónsson 90'	Stadium: Tønsberg Gressbane; Referee: Herman Leiulfsrud Aass

1 May 2019	Hinna (5)	2–0	(3) Sola	Stavanger
15:00 CEST (UTC+2)	Thioune 27' (pen.); Cairo 90'	Report		Stadium: Wintershallbanen; Referee: Amir Mohammed Ajjour

1 May 2019	Træff (4)	3–4	(3) Hødd	Molde
15:00 CEST (UTC+2)	Varhaugvik 5'; Samdal 15'; Khachatrjan 37'	Report	Brautaset 1'; Rise 37'; Sætre 73'; Shroot 84'	Stadium: Reknesbanen; Referee: Bendik Haarberg

1 May 2019	Spjelkavik (4)	2–4 (a.e.t.)	(3) Brattvåg	Spjelkavik
16:00 CEST (UTC+2)	Waagan 51'; Tafjord 117'	Report	Jonassen 68'; Leine 103'; Sandnes Beite 114', 120'	Stadium: Spjelkavik Stadion; Referee: Haakon Javier Tronstad

1 May 2019	Verdal (4)	1–4	(3) Stjørdals-Blink	Verdalsøra
16:00 CEST (UTC+2)	Skeie 66'	Report	Lillebo 24'; Rygg 30'; Solli 41'; Sisic 88'	Stadium: Coop Arena; Attendance: 111; Referee: Jonas Johnsen

1 May 2019	Rørvik (5)	1–3	(1) Rosenborg	Rørvik
16:00 CEST (UTC+2)	Fausa 30'	Report	Valsvik 4'; Konradsen 52'; Botheim 59'	Stadium: Rørvik kunstgress Referee: Mathias Støfringshaug

1 May 2019	Melbo (4)	1–0	(3) Mjølner	Melbu
16:00 CEST (UTC+2)	Pedersen 15'	Report		Stadium: Havfisk Stadion; Referee: Ole Ragnar Jansen Knutsen

1 May 2019	Skjervøy (4)	0–6	(2) Tromsdalen	Skjervøy
16:00 CEST (UTC+2)		Report	Andreassen 14', 79'; Løvland 25'; Kind Bendiksen 69'; Lorentzen 88'; Kjæve 90'	Stadium: Lerøy Stadion; Referee: Kristian Kristiansen

1 May 2019	Heming (5)	1–3	(1) Stabæk	Oslo
17:00 CEST (UTC+2)	Scheele Moe 90'	Report	Aga 25', 55'; Youness Mokhtar 83'	Stadium: Heming Kunstgress; Attendance: 1,200; Referee: Stian Røvig Sletner

1 May 2019	Bergsøy (5)	0–3	(2) Aalesund	Bergsøy
17:00 CEST (UTC+2)		Report	Agdestein 27', 54'; Steen Sæthre 86'	Stadium: Havila Stadion Fosnavåg; Attendance: 922; Referee: Even Myrheim

1 May 2019	Kvik Halden (3)	5–0	(4) Lokomotiv Oslo	Halden
18:00 CEST (UTC+2)	Lundblad Næsheim 16', 32'; Mehmeti 50'; Nomell 68', 72'	Report		Stadium: Halden Stadion; Attendance: 301; Referee: Abdulhadi Al-Fahad

1 May 2019	Sparta Sarpsborg (5)	0–9	(3) Fredrikstad	Sarpsborg
18:00 CEST (UTC+2)		Report	Stray Molde 16', 32'; Nilsen 24', 30', 49'; Hagen 34', 66'; Maikel 68'; Begby 74'; Sandberg 88'	Stadium: Sarpsborg Stadion; Attendance: 550; Referee: Sebastian Mikalsen

1 May 2019	Kråkerøy (4)	2–6	(3) Grorud	Fredrikstad
18:00 CEST (UTC+2)	Krogsrud 12'; Mbedule 18'	Report	Kristoffersen Hagen 20'; Elsebutangen 38'; Ali 56'; Edvardsen 83', 90'; Mankowitz 86'	Stadium: Fredrikstad Stadion; Attendance: 40; Referee: Eirik Wisted-thu

1 May 2019	Sprint-Jeløy (5)	0–3	(1) Sarpsborg 08	Moss
18:00 CEST (UTC+2)		Report	Ruud Tveter 59'; Salvesen 69'; Strand Larsen 73'	Stadium: Bellevue Kunstgress; Attendance: 800; Referee: Ole-Alexander Ekeli Valen

1 May 2019	Follo (4)	1–2 (a.e.t.)	(3) Bærum	Ski
18:00 CEST (UTC+2)	Darlishta 37'	Report	Sørensen 90'; Slemdal 107'	Stadium: Ski Stadion; Referee: Haakon Arve Pedersen Bue

1 May 2019	Lyn (4)	0–5	(3) Moss	Oslo
18:00 CEST (UTC+2)		Report	Ali 2', 32'; Reinback 42'; Svindland 49'; Sanyang 84'	Stadium: Kringsjå Kunstgress; Attendance: 452; Referee: Martin Myrnes Bolstad

1 May 2019	Ready (4)	0–9	(2) Skeid	Oslo
18:00 CEST (UTC+2)		Report	Ayoub Aleesami 10', 30'; Tavakoli 19'; Abelsen 32'; Hickson 50', 74'; Adams 72'; Nunez Godoy 81'; Johnny Buduson 90'	Stadium: Gressbanen Kunstgress; Referee: Mohammad Hafezi

1 May 2019	Gjelleråsen (4)	1–3	(1) Lillestrøm	Nittedal
18:00 CEST (UTC+2)	Lloyd 90'	Report	Lehne Olsen 77'; Gustavsson 90'; Dyer 90' (pen.)	Stadium: Li Kunstgress; Attendance: 1,547; Referee: Ajdin Medic

1 May 2019	Skjetten (4)	2–3	(4) Lørenskog	Skjetten
18:00 CEST (UTC+2)	Rydje 48'; Rahim 58' (pen.)	Report	Alba 20', 90' (pen.); Forsberg 79'	Stadium: Skjetten Stadion; Referee: Satha Sejoohn Sritharan

1 May 2019	Eidsvold Turn (4)	3–0 (a.e.t.)	(4) Frigg	Eidsvoll Municipality
18:00 CEST (UTC+2)	Kristjansson 99'; Rustad Rudi 105'; Flugheim Heggestad 109'	Report		Stadium: Myhrer Stadion; Referee: Hakan Catalgøl

1 May 2019	Ottestad (5)	0–1	(2) HamKam	Ottestad
18:00 CEST (UTC+2)		Report	Enkerud 12'	Stadium: Ottestad Idrettspark; Attendance: 650; Referee: Shervin Heydary

1 May 2019	Toten (5)	2–5 (a.e.t.)	(2) Raufoss	Østre Toten
18:00 CEST (UTC+2)	Somesi 81'; Senstad 90' (pen.)	Report	Simenstad 70'; Henningsson 90'; Bizoza 107'; Maigaard 111'; Belli Moldskred 112'	Stadium: Østre Toten Kunstgressbane; Referee: Johan William Grundt

1 May 2019	Nybergsund (4)	1–3 (a.e.t.)	(2) Kongsvinger	Nybergsund
18:00 CEST (UTC+2)	Tambucho 25'	Report	Rønningen 20' (pen.); Güven 96', 119'	Stadium: Nybergsund Stadion; Referee: Jørgen Haugen

1 May 2019	Brumunddal (4)	0–3	(3) Elverum	Brumunddal
18:00 CEST (UTC+2)		Report	Solum 50'; Nordengen 56', 60'	Stadium: SH-banen; Attendance: 246; Referee: Christoffer Dalby Bergstuen

1 May 2019	Åssiden (5)	1–2	(3) Kjelsås	Drammen
18:00 CEST (UTC+2)	Andersen 50'	Report	Idrissi 12'; Solli 32'	Stadium: Åssiden Stadion; Referee: Nedim Brbovic

1 May 2019	Vestfossen (4)	0–3	(3) Asker	Vestfossen
18:00 CEST (UTC+2)		Report	Jones 8' (pen.); Skaug 28', 54'	Stadium: RVS Parken Vestfossen Kunstgress; Referee: Mohammad Nabhani

1 May 2019	Ørn-Horten (4)	0–2	(4) Pors	Horten
18:00 CEST (UTC+2)		Report	Thorsen 2'; Shala 47'	Stadium: Lystlunden Stadion; Referee: Morten Stakkestad Flaten

1 May 2019	Flint (4)	0–7	(1) Strømsgodset	Tønsberg
18:00 CEST (UTC+2)		Report	Ringstad 30'; Mos 54'; Rønning Ovenstad 75', 89'; Pedersen 85', 90'; Pellegrino 89'	Stadium: Flint ESSO Arena; Referee: Henrik Andreas Grenå Pettersen

1 May 2019	Fram (3)	1–0	(2) Start	Larvik
18:00 CEST (UTC+2)	Byklum 65'	Report		Stadium: Framparken; Attendance: 811; Referee: Harald Magnus Børresen

1 May 2019	Donn (4)	0–2	(2) Notodden	Kristiansand
18:00 CEST (UTC+2)		Report	Hustad 4'; Ibrahim 86'	Stadium: Kristiansand Stadion; Attendance: 217; Referee: Jørgen Haga

1 May 2019	Fløy (4)	1–2	(2) Jerv	Flekkerøy
18:00 CEST (UTC+2)	Dreshaj 56'	Report	Aase 60'; Håbestad 90'	Stadium: Arkicon Arena; Referee: Sander Magdalon Bråten Johannessen

1 May 2019	Vindbjart (4)	0–3	(3) Arendal	Vennesla
18:00 CEST (UTC+2)		Report	Kvaalen 25'; Bruhn Christensen 33'; Berglann 90'; Bruhn Christensen 33'; Berglann 90'	Stadium: Moseidmoen Umbrokunstgress; Attendance: 349; Referee: Håvard Bjerkelund

1 May 2019	Ålgård (5)	0–9	(3) Bryne	Ålgård
18:00 CEST (UTC+2)		Report	Langeland 26'; Myhre 35', 47'; Undheim 63'; Baldvinsson 70' el Ghaouti 75', 83'; Own Goal 88' (o.g.); Rosland 88'	Stadium: Nye Ålgård Stadion; Referee: Zyad Tarik Qashua

1 May 2019	Brodd (4)	0–2	(3) Egersund	Stavanger
18:00 CEST (UTC+2)		Report	Bjørlo 74'; Naglestad 90'	Stadium: Midjord idrettspark Referee: Senthalan Sellathurai

1 May 2019	Madla (4)	0–2	(2) Sandnes Ulf	Madla
18:00 CEST (UTC+2)		Report	Eriksen 71', 89'	Stadium: Madla Handelslag Stadion; Attendance: 473; Referee: André Bjørgen Birkeland

1 May 2019	Åkra (5)	0–4	(1) Haugesund	Åkrehamn
18:00 CEST (UTC+2)		Report	Samuelsen 10', 60'; Koné 59'; Langåker Underhaug 78' (o.g.)	Stadium: Åkra Kunstgress; Attendance: 1,200; Referee: Aleksander S. Vermundsen

1 May 2019	Vard Haugesund (4)	2–1 (a.e.t.)	(3) Vidar	Haugesund
18:00 CEST (UTC+2)	Aleksander Gundersen 47'; Barane 99'	Report	Klemetsen Jakobsen 30'	Stadium: Haugesund Stadion; Referee: Alexander Stephane Milovanovic Pössl

1 May 2019	Frøya (5)	1–6	(2) Nest-Sotra	Bergen
18:00 CEST (UTC+2)	Skutl 18'	Report	Mehnert 1', 24'; Arrocha 20'; Sørensen Nergaard 36'; Økland 54'; Berg Sande 86'	Stadium: Frøya Idrettspark; Referee: Adrian Gjendemsjø

1 May 2019	Fyllingsdalen (4)	3–2	(4) Fana	Bergen
18:00 CEST (UTC+2)	Huseklepp 3', 28'; Mykkeltvedt 17'	Report	Hummervoll 5'; Moldestad 73'	Stadium: Varden Amfi; Attendance: 173; Referee: Anders Bjerk Hansen

1 May 2019	Arna-Bjørnar (5)	1–6	(1) Brann	Bergen
18:00 CEST (UTC+2)	Mjelde Tysse 25'	Report	Grøgaard 21'; Kjelsrud Johansen 31' (pen.), 55'; Karadas 57'; Mjøs 66' (pen.), 80'	Stadium: Arna Idrettspark; Attendance: 2,382; Referee: André Knudsen Arnholt

1 May 2019	Lysekloster (4)	2–4	(3) Sotra	Lysefjorden
18:00 CEST (UTC+2)	Garbacik 82'; Haugland Båsen 90'	Report	Kalve 43'; Kilen 64'; Falck 85'; Rugland 88'	Stadium: Lysekloster Framo Idrettspark; Attendance: 200; Referee: Øyvind Nesdal Birkeland

1 May 2019	Bergen Nord (4)	1–5	(3) Åsane	Bergen
18:00 CEST (UTC+2)	Egesund 69'	Report	Bruun-Hanssen 8'; Hopsdal 39'; Udahl 63' (pen.), 73'; Lorentzen 88'	Stadium: Flaktveit Stadion; Referee: Sondre Brudvik

1 May 2019	Stryn (5)	0–5	(2) Sogndal	Stryn
18:00 CEST (UTC+2)		Report	Soltvedt 8'; Sveen 55', 90'; Steiring 58'; Flo 79'	Stadium: Stryn Stadion; Referee: Jonny Skjerven

1 May 2019	Herd (4)	0–1	(1) Kristiansund	Ålesund
18:00 CEST (UTC+2)		Report	Egilsson Olsen 36'	Stadium: AMFI Moa Stadion; Attendance: 610; Referee: Torgeir Halsen

1 May 2019	Eide/Omegn (5)	0–5	(1) Molde	Eide
18:00 CEST (UTC+2)		Report	James 10', 26'; Ulland Andersen 19', 68' (pen.), 72'	Stadium: Eide Kunstgressbane; Attendance: 1,000; Referee: Mathias Smehus Kringstad

1 May 2019	Sunndal (4)	1–0	(3) Byåsen	Sunndalsøra
18:00 CEST (UTC+2)	Torske 82'	Report		Stadium: Sande Stadion; Attendance: 119; Referee: Karl-Edvard Gundersen Brendskag

1 May 2019	NTNUI (5)	0–2	(3) Nardo	Trondheim
18:00 CEST (UTC+2)		Report	Engan 21'; Tømmerdal Frøner 54'	Stadium: Ørn Arena; Attendance: 70; Referee: Erik Plahn

1 May 2019	Kolstad (4)	1–3	(1) Ranheim	Trondheim
18:00 CEST (UTC+2)	Rotlid 18'	Report	Skarsem 22'; Kvande 35'; Sollie Rønning 90'	Stadium: Kolstad Idrettspark; Referee: Robert Eggen

1 May 2019	Trygg/Lade (5)	2–3	(4) Tiller	Trondheim
18:00 CEST (UTC+2)	Selnes 82'; Saur Holte 89'	Report	Myrvold Welo 18'; Killingberg 73', 77'	Stadium: OBOS Kunstgressbane; Attendance: 82; Referee: Erlend Helmersen

1 May 2019	Steinkjer (4)	0–6	(3) Levanger	Steinkjer
18:00 CEST (UTC+2)		Report	Voll 18'; Buzuku 26', 75'; Ziabi Sereba 31' (pen.), 41'; Hajdari 82'	Stadium: Guldbergaunet stadion Attendance: 432; Referee: Oliver Skaret Barsøe

1 May 2019	Åga (5)	0–8	(1) Bodø/Glimt	Mo i Rana
18:00 CEST (UTC+2)		Report	Konaté 15', 53', 67'; Reinholt Jensen 19' (o.g.); Hauge 30', 55' (pen.); Sigurjónsson 40'; Tjærandsen-Skau 83'	Stadium: Hauknes Kunstgressbane; Attendance: 1,000; Referee: Martin Berg

1 May 2019	Porsanger (5)	0–3	(3) Alta	Lakselv
18:00 CEST (UTC+2)		Report	Ytrehauge Balto 16'; Berg Pedersen 90'; Nome 90' (pen.)	Stadium: Lakselv Kunstgress; Referee: Pål Arntzen

1 May 2019	Norild (4)	1–8	(1) Tromsø	Vadsø
18:00 CEST (UTC+2)	Stavseth 16'	Report	Nilsen 5'; Slungård Rushfeldt 13' (o.g.); Rojas 16'; Kjærgaard 18', 23', 30'; Grønli 34' (pen.); Ingebrigtsen 53'	Stadium: Vadsø Stadion; Attendance: 800; Referee: Ola Kellerhals

1 May 2019	Skånland (5)	0–3	(4) Harstad	Evenskjer
18:15 CEST (UTC+2)		Report	Strømøy Kajander 26'; Andreassen 54'; Damilola Olaoye 59'	Stadium: Skånland Kunstgress; Attendance: 150; Referee: Simen Albrigtsen Eilertsen

1 May 2019	Hønefoss (4)	0–2	(1) Mjøndalen	Hønefoss
19:00 CEST (UTC+2)		Report	Brustad 54', 87'	Stadium: AKA Arena; Attendance: 480; Referee: Harald Røvig Sletner

2 May 2019	Gjøvik-Lyn (4)	2–3	(2) Ullensaker/Kisa	Gjøvik
18:00 CEST (UTC+2)	Jansen 50'; Skogli 76'	Report	Henriksen 11'; Torp 63'; Søreide 75'	Stadium: Gjøvik Stadion; Attendance: 120; Referee: Sulman Hussain

2 May 2019	Storm (4)	2–7	(1) Odd	Skien
18:00 CEST (UTC+2)	Pedersen 56'; Hagen 78'	Report	Lauritsen 35', 74', 90' (pen.); Kitolano 38'; Samuelsen 39'; Delaveris 53'; Hoff 81'	Stadium: Bratsberg Kunstgress; Attendance: 1,928; Referee: Jon Romuld Håversen

2 May 2019	Frøyland (5)	1–3	(1) Viking	Kvernaland
18:00 CEST (UTC+2)	Karlson 39'	Report	Bytyqi 55', 63'; Thorstvedt 70'	Stadium: Frøyland Stadion; Attendance: 1,030; Referee: Mischa Kellerhals

2 May 2019	Fløya (4)	5–0	(3) Senja	Tromsø
18:00 CEST (UTC+2)	Indal Andersen 3'; Roland 10'; Simonsen 51'; Mæhle 74'; Berg-Johansen 89'	Report		Stadium: Fløya Arena; Attendance: 100; Referee: Vegar Ballovarre

2 May 2019	Faaberg (5)	0–3	(1) Vålerenga	Fåberg
18:00 CEST (UTC+2)		Report	Azemi 18', 59'; Vega 70'	Stadium: Jorekstad Hovedbanen; Attendance: 956; Referee: Anders Bodding

8 May 2019	Junkeren (4)	0–2	(2) Strømmen	Bodø
18:00 CEST (UTC+2)		Report	Håvard Segtnan Thun 1', 70'	Stadium: Nordlandshallen; Referee: Ali al Hatam

== Second round ==
Number of teams per tier entering this round
Eliteserien (1)	1. divisjon (2)	2. divisjon (3)	3. divisjon (4)	4. divisjon (5)	Total
16 / 16	15 / 16	21 / 28	11 / 84	1 / 298	64 / 442

21 May 2019	Elverum (3)	1–6	(1) Stabæk	Elverum
18:00 CEST (UTC+2)	Solum 62'	Report	Kassi 2' (pen.); Vihmann 35'; Aga 57', 72', 90'; Geelmuyden 77'	Stadium: Elverum Stadion; Attendance: 652; Referee: Eivind Bodding

22 May 2019	Strømmen (2)	2–1 (a.e.t.)	(1) Bodø/Glimt	Strømmen
17:00 CEST (UTC+2)	Vestvatn 30'; Thun 108'	Report	Isidoro 81'	Stadium: Strømmen Stadion; Referee: Harald Røvig Sletner

22 May 2019	Kvik Halden (3)	1–4	(1) Lillestrøm	Halden
18:00 CEST (UTC+2)	Hasanagic 86'	Report	Lehne Olsen 9'; Pedersen 38'; Gustafsson 66', 73'	Stadium: Halden Stadion; Attendance: 1,014; Referee: Ole-Alexander Ekeli Valen

22 May 2019	Moss (3)	1–2	(2) Kongsvinger	Moss
18:00 CEST (UTC+2)	Reinback 26'	Report	Aanesland 40'; Vinjor 60'	Stadium: Melløs Stadion; Referee: Abdulhadi Al-Fahad

22 May 2019	Grorud (3)	1–0 (a.e.t.)	(2) Hamkam	Oslo
18:00 CEST (UTC+2)	Mankowitz 40'	Report		Stadium: Grorud Matchbane; Referee: Jørgen Haugen

22 May 2019	Kjelsås (3)	3–4 (a.e.t.)	(2) Skeid	Oslo
18:00 CEST (UTC+2)	Akinyemi 8'; Idrissi 74'; Aasarød 90'	Report	El-Amrani 49'; Buduson 66'; Mjelde Håberg 68' (o.g.); Flåte 96'	Stadium: Grefsen Kunstgress; Attendance: 970; Referee: Sulman Hussain

22 May 2019	Asker (3)	2–3	(2) KFUM Oslo	Asker
18:00 CEST (UTC+2)	Skog 34'; Fallås Dahl 89'	Report	Kastrati 32', 90'; Moula 50'	Stadium: Føyka Kunstgress; Referee: Henrik Andreas Grenå Pettersen

22 May 2019	Bærum (3)	2–1	(2) Notodden	Bærum Municipality
18:00 CEST (UTC+2)	Berg 23'; Ifejilika 90'	Report	Ledger 5'	Stadium: Sandvika Stadion; Referee: Emilie Rodahl Dokset

22 May 2019	Lørenskog (4)	1–3	(2) Ull/Kisa	Lørenskog Municipality
18:00 CEST (UTC+2)	Singh 78'	Report	Økland 24'; Nesset 36'; Kitolano 46'	Stadium: Rolvsrud Kunstgress; Attendance: 274; Referee: Anders Bodding

22 May 2019	Fram (3)	1–1 (a.e.t.) (4–3 p)	(2) Raufoss	Larvik
18:00 CEST (UTC+2)	Ndiaye 88'	Report	Fandi 34'	Stadium: Framparken; Attendance: 562; Referee: Stian Røvig Sletner
	Penalties
	Dyngeland (penalty scored); Byklum (penalty scored); Lie (penalty scored); Nielsen (penalty scored); Ndiaye (penalty missed)		(penalty scored) Maigaard; (penalty scored) Nilsen; (penalty scored) Bizoza; (penalty missed) Fandi; (penalty missed) Henningsson

22 May 2019	Pors (4)	2–4	(1) Mjøndalen	Porsgrunn
18:00 CEST (UTC+2)	Shala 19', 63'	Report	Johansen 8'; Brustad 22'; Liseth 49'; Bojang 69'	Stadium: Pors Stadion; Attendance: 343; Referee: Sander Magdalon Bråten

22 May 2019	Jerv (2)	1–2	(2) Sandefjord	Grimstad
18:00 CEST (UTC+2)	Hoel Andersen 90'	Report	Ofkir 90'; Mladenovic 90'	Stadium: Levermyr Stadion; Attendance: 935; Referee: Jon Romuld Håversen

22 May 2019	Arendal (3)	0–2	(1) Odd	Arendal
18:00 CEST (UTC+2)		Report	Lauritsen 8'; Børven 85'	Stadium: Bjønnes Stadion; Attendance: 1,254; Referee: Marius Lien

22 May 2019	Egersund (3)	2–2 (a.e.t.) (4–5 p)	(3) Bryne	Egersund
18:00 CEST (UTC+2)	Sumareh 39'; Jablinski 71'	Report	Rosland 45'; Myhre 77'	Stadium: Idrettsparken Egersund; Attendance: 743; Referee: Svein Tore Sinnes
	Penalties
	Grande (penalty scored); Perttamo (penalty scored); Naglestad (penalty missed); Cordero (penalty scored); Nyborg (penalty scored); Jablinski (penalty missed)		(penalty scored) Fjelde; (penalty missed) el Ghaouti; (penalty scored) Dybevik; (penalty scored) Myhre; (penalty scored) Ystanes; (penalty scored) Bore

22 May 2019	Vard Haugesund (4)	0–2 (a.e.t.)	(2) Sandnes Ulf	Haugesund
18:00 CEST (UTC+2)		Report	Holmvik 114'; Eriksen 116'	Stadium: Haugesund Stadion; Attendance: 100; Referee: Mischa Kellerhals

22 May 2019	Sotra (3)	1–3	(1) Haugesund	Sotra
18:00 CEST (UTC+2)	Stava 49'	Report	Wadji 36'; Krygård 63', 74'	Stadium: Straume Idrettspark; Referee: Steinar Hauge

22 May 2019	Fyllingsdalen (4)	0–4	(2) Nest-Sotra	Bergen
18:00 CEST (UTC+2)		Report	Dang 15', 27'; Mehnert 49'; Berge Sande 89'	Stadium: Varden Amfi; Attendance: 250; Referee: Jan Morten Tennøy

22 May 2019	Florø (3)	0–1	(2) Aalesund	Florø
18:00 CEST (UTC+2)		Report	Castro 83' (pen.)	Stadium: Florø Stadion; Referee: Sivert Øksnes Amland

22 May 2019	Hødd (3)	0–2	(2) Sogndal	Ulsteinvik
18:00 CEST (UTC+2)		Report	Soltvedt 9'; Jensen 69'	Stadium: Høddvoll; Attendance: 563; Referee: André Knudsen Arnholt

22 May 2019	Brattvåg (3)	1–2 (a.e.t.)	(1) Kristiansund	Brattvåg
18:00 CEST (UTC+2)	Rekdal 58'	Report	Kastrati 71'; Kalludra 120'	Stadium: Brattvåg Gras; Referee: Torgeir Halsen

22 May 2019	Tiller (4)	0–3	(1) Rosenborg	Trondheim
18:00 CEST (UTC+2)		Report	Botheim 57'; Meling 62'; Åsen 87'	Stadium: Tonstad kunstgress Attendance: 2,512; Referee: Robert Eggen

22 May 2019	Nardo (3)	0–3	(1) Ranheim	Trondheim
18:00 CEST (UTC+2)		Report	Heggem 29'; Sollie Rønning 85'; Walker 90'	Stadium: Nissekollen; Attendance: 637; Referee: Mads Skarsem

22 May 2019	Levanger (3)	3–0	(3) Stjørdals/Blink	Levanger
18:00 CEST (UTC+2)	Öjhage 67'; Hegdahl Gundersen 75'; Voll 90'	Report		Stadium: Moan Fritidspark; Attendance: 637; Referee: Mathias Støfringshuag

22 May 2019	Melbo (4)	1–2	(1) Tromsø	Melbu
18:00 CEST (UTC+2)	Karl-Christian Karlsen 20'	Report	Rojas 57'; Mikkelsen 76'	Stadium: Havfisk Stadion; Referee: Ali Al-Hatem

22 May 2019	Harstad (4)	2–3	(2) Tromsdalen	Harstad
18:00 CEST (UTC+2)	Pedersen 65'; Kajander 76'	Report	Sandbukt 50'; Ringberg 55', 82'	Stadium: Harstad Stadion; Attendance: 186; Referee: Ole Ragnar Jansen Knutsen

22 May 2019	Fløya (4)	0–3	(3) Alta	Tromsø
18:00 CEST (UTC+2)		Report	Spence 4'; Berg Pedersen 44', 81'	Stadium: Fløy Arena; Referee: Martin Berg

22 May 2019	Eidsvold Turn (4)	0–5	(1) Vålerenga	Eidsvoll
19:00 CEST (UTC+2)		Report	Vilhjálmsson 11', 61'; Finne 55', 65', 78'	Stadium: Myhrer Stadion; Attendance: 1,590; Referee: Shervin Heydary

22 May 2019	Fredrikstad (3)	0–2	(1) Sarpsborg 08	Fredrikstad
20:00 CEST (UTC+2)		Report	Skålevik 48'; Salvesen 83'	Stadium: Fredrikstad Stadion; Attendance: 6,087; Referee: Christian Moen

23 May 2019	Ullern (4)	0–1	(1) Strømsgodset	Oslo
18:00 CEST (UTC+2)		Report	Hamoud 37'	Stadium: Ullern Kunstgress; Referee: Ola Kellerhals

23 May 2019	Hinna (5)	1–4	(1) Viking	Stavanger
18:00 CEST (UTC+2)	Alf Jakob Aano 47'	Report	Friðjónsson 19', 36'; Tripić 28', 81'	Stadium: Wintershallbanen; Referee: Daniel Higraff

23 May 2019	Åsane (3)	0–2	(1) Brann	Åsane
18:00 CEST (UTC+2)		Report	Kjelsrud Johansen 57'; Strand 74'	Stadium: Åsane Idrettspark; Referee: Marius Hansen Grøtta

23 May 2019	Sunndal (4)	0–4	(1) Molde	Sunndalsøra
18:00 CEST (UTC+2)		Report	Remmer 5'; James 17'; Nyland Ørsahl 37', 38'	Stadium: Sande Stadion; Referee: Mathias Smehus Kringstad

== Third round ==
Number of teams per tier entering this round
Eliteserien (1)	1. divisjon (2)	2. divisjon (3)	3. divisjon (4)	4. divisjon (5)	Total
15 / 16	11 / 16	6 / 28	0 / 84	0 / 298	32 / 442

19 June 2019	Grorud (3)	0–1	(1) Mjøndalen	Oslo
18:00 CEST (UTC+2)		Report	Johansen 18'	Stadium: Grorud Matchbane; Attendance: 540; Referee: Sigurd Smehus Kringstad

19 June 2019	Bærum (3)	5–3	(1) Vålerenga	Bærum Municipality
18:00 CEST (UTC+2)	Aubert 41' (pen.); Ifejilika 52'; Berg 56'; Kidane 61'; Rogulj 80'	Report	Dønnum 8'; Ejuke 35'; Vilhjálmsson 73'	Stadium: Sandvika Stadion; Referee: Christian Moen

19 June 2019	Skeid (2)	0–3	(1) Ranheim	Oslo
18:00 CEST (UTC+2)		Report	Tønne 16' (pen.); Reginiussen 70'; Sondre Sørløkk 72'	Stadium: Intility Arena; Attendance: 322; Referee: Steinar Hauge

19 June 2019	Strømmen (2)	1–0	(1) Lillestrøm	Strømmen
18:00 CEST (UTC+2)	Stenseth Gussiås 52'	Report		Stadium: Strømmen Stadion; Attendance: 1,235; Referee: Ola Hobber Nilsen

19 June 2019	Ull/Kisa (2)	1–2 (a.e.t.)	(1) Rosenborg	Jessheim
18:00 CEST (UTC+2)	Langås 65'	Report	Akintola 72'; Adegbenro 102'	Stadium: UKI Arena; Attendance: 3,435; Referee: Trygve Kjensli

19 June 2019	Sandefjord (2)	1–1 (a.e.t.) (1–3 p)	(1) Odd	Sandefjord
18:00 CEST (UTC+2)	Grorud 38'	Report	Ruud 90'	Stadium: Komplett Arena; Attendance: 1,126; Referee: Trond Ivar Døvle
	Penalties
	Vallès (penalty missed); Mjelde (penalty scored); Kurtovic (penalty missed); Engblom (penalty missed)		(penalty scored) Ruud; (penalty missed) Lauritsen; (penalty scored) Børven; (penalty scored) Fredrik Nordkvelle

19 June 2019	Fram (3)	2–1	(1) Strømsgodset	Larvik
18:00 CEST (UTC+2)	Hamoud 38' (o.g.); Osestad 82' (pen.)	Report	Pellegrino 6'	Stadium: Framparken; Attendance: 1,743; Referee: Svein Tore Sinnes

19 June 2019	Sandnes Ulf (2)	1–2	(1) Viking	Sandnes
18:00 CEST (UTC+2)	Kapidzic 90' (pen.)	Report	Høiland 46'; Ibrahimaj 58'	Stadium: Sandnes Stadion; Attendance: 2,450; Referee: Kai Erik Steen

19 June 2019	Nest-Sotra (2)	0–4	(2) KFUM Oslo	Ågotnes
18:00 CEST (UTC+2)		Report	Mawa 17', 29', 32'; Agouda 25'	Stadium: Ågotnes Stadion; Referee: Tommy Skjerven

19 June 2019	Sogndal (2)	1–2	(1) Brann	Sogndalsfjøra
18:00 CEST (UTC+2)	Haugen 27'	Report	Antonijevic 41' (o.g.); Ordagic 42'	Stadium: Fosshaugane Campus; Attendance: 2,564; Referee: Espen Eskås

19 June 2019	Levanger (3)	1–3	(1) Kristiansund	Levanger
18:00 CEST (UTC+2)	Sakshaug 90'	Report	Coly 52' (pen.); Bye 58' (pen.) 83'; Ordagic 42'	Stadium: Moan fritidspark Attendance: 659; Referee: Marius Hansen Grøtta

19 June 2019	Tromsdalen (2)	1–0	(1) Sarpsborg 08	Tromsø
18:00 CEST (UTC+2)	Kristoffersen 61'	Report		Stadium: TUIL Arena; Attendance: 1,004; Referee: Mads Skarsem

19 June 2019	Bryne (3)	2–6	(1) Haugesund	Bryne
19:00 CEST (UTC+2)	el Ghaouti 65', 67'	Report	Velde 3', 64'; Samuelsen 5', 16'; Sandberg 38'; Kallevåg 90'	Stadium: Bryne Stadion; Attendance: 504; Referee: Tore Hansen

19 June 2019	Aalesund (2)	4–0	(1) Molde	Ålesund
20:00 CEST (UTC+2)	Friðjónsson 14', 17'; Fet 55'; Þrándarson 58'	Report		Stadium: Color Line Stadion; Attendance: 4,017; Referee: Tom Harald Hagen

20 June 2019	Kongsvinger (2)	1–0	(1) Tromsø	Kongsvinger
18:00 CEST (UTC+2)	Güven 53'			Stadium: Gjemselund Stadion; Attendance: 1,269; Referee: Marius Lien

20 June 2019	Alta (3)	1–4	(1) Stabæk	Alta
18:00 CEST (UTC+2)	Reginiussen 50'		Vetlesen 4'; Gyasi 75'; Boli 78', 90'	Stadium: Finnmarkshallen; Attendance: 622; Referee: Ajdin Medic

== Fourth round ==
Number of teams per tier entering this round
Eliteserien (1)	1. divisjon (2)	2. divisjon (3)	3. divisjon (4)	4. divisjon (5)	Total
9 / 16	5 / 16	2 / 28	0 / 84	0 / 298	16 / 442

26 June 2019	Fram (3)	3–1	(3) Bærum	Larvik
18:00 CEST (UTC+2)	Ndiaye 8', 78'; Solberg Nilsen 44'	Report	Berg 65'	Stadium: Framparken; Attendance: 2,465; Referee: Tom Harald Hagen (Brandval IL)

26 June 2019	Ranheim (1)	4–0	(1) Brann	Trondheim
18:00 CEST (UTC+2)	Blakstad 12', 65'; Reginiussen 50'; Solbakken 59'	Report		Stadium: EXTRA Arena; Attendance: 1,250; Referee: Trygve Kjensli (Nesodden IF)

26 June 2019	Kristiansund (1)	1–2 (a.e.t.)	(1) Odd	Kristiansund
18:00 CEST (UTC+2)	Sørli 76'	Report	Lauritsen 82'; Sander Svendsen 107'	Stadium: Kristiansund Stadion; Attendance: 2,216; Referee: Dag Vidar Hafsås (Kolstad Fotball)

26 June 2019	Viking (1)	5–2	(1) Stabæk	Stavanger
18:00 CEST (UTC+2)	Furdal 8'; Vikstøl 21'; Østensen 23'; Thorstvedt 84'; Høiland 86'	Report	Gyasi 10'; Braaten 18'	Stadium: Viking Stadion; Attendance: 3,469; Referee: Rohit Saggi (SBK Drafn)

26 June 2019	KFUM Oslo (2)	2–1	(2) Tromsdalen	Oslo
18:00 CEST (UTC+2)	Sortevik 17', 90'	Report	Finjord Ringberg 31'	Stadium: KFUM Arena; Attendance: 997; Referee: Kristoffer Hagenes (TIL Hovding)

26 June 2019	Kongsvinger (2)	0–3	(1) Mjøndalen	Kongsvinger
18:00 CEST (UTC+2)		Report	Aasmundsen 49', 72'; Sondre Johansen 64'	Stadium: Gjemselund Stadion; Attendance: 1,223; Referee: Espen Eskås (Bækkelagets SK)

26 June 2019	Haugesund (1)	2–0 (a.e.t.)	(2) Strømmen	Haugesund
18:00 CEST (UTC+2)	Ibrahima Koné 112'; Samuelsen 116'	Report		Stadium: Haugesund Stadion; Attendance: 1,875; Referee: Sigurd Smehus Kringstad (IL Valder)

26 June 2019	Rosenborg (1)	1–1 (a.e.t.) (4–5 p)	(2) Aalesund	Trondheim
20:00 CEST (UTC+2)	Reginiussen 82'	Report	Castro 35'	Stadium: Lerkendal Stadion; Attendance: 5,122; Referee: Ola Hobber Nilsen (Nordstrand IF)
	Penalties
	Jensen (penalty scored); Hovland (penalty scored); Søderlund (penalty missed); Meling (penalty scored); Akintola (penalty scored)		(penalty scored) Carlsen; (penalty scored) Meade; (penalty scored) Lie; (penalty scored) Steen Sæthre; (penalty scored) Friðjónsson

== Quarter-finals ==
Number of teams per tier entering this round
Eliteserien (1)	1. divisjon (2)	2. divisjon (3)	3. divisjon (4)	4. divisjon (5)	Total
5 / 16	2 / 16	1 / 28	0 / 84	0 / 298	8 / 442

25 September 2019	Ranheim (1)	3–0	(3) Fram	Trondheim
18:00 CEST (UTC+2)	Karlsen 41'; Reginiussen 43'; Solbakken 60'	Report		Stadium: EXTRA Arena; Attendance: 1,407; Referee: Sigurd Smehus Kringstad (IL Valder)

25 September 2019	Mjøndalen (1)	1–3	(1) Haugesund	Mjøndalen
20:00 CEST (UTC+2)	Occéan 84'	Report	Pedersen 18'; Samuelsen 65'; Kallevåg 86'	Stadium: Consto Arena; Attendance: 1,141; Referee: Kristoffer Hagenes (TIL Hovding)

26 September 2019	KFUM Oslo (2)	2–5	(1) Odd	Oslo
18:00 CEST (UTC+2)	Tavakoli 32'; Olden Larsen 80'	Report	Børven 31'; Lauritsen 38'; Delaveris 74', 85'; Hoff 84'	Stadium: KFUM Arena; Attendance: 2,236; Referee: Rohit Saggi (SBK Drafn)

26 September 2019	Aalesund (2)	1–1 (a.e.t.) (3–5 p)	(1) Viking	Ålesund
20:00 CEST (UTC+2)	Castro 11' (pen.)	Report	Torsteinbø 40'	Stadium: Color Line Stadion; Attendance: 5,829; Referee: Kai Erik Steen (IL Gneist)
	Penalties
	Castro (penalty scored); Lie (penalty scored); Steen Sæthre (penalty missed); Azofeifa (penalty scored)		(penalty scored) Høiland; (penalty scored) Østensen; (penalty scored) Pereira; (penalty scored) Friðjónsson; (penalty scored) Tripić

== Semi-finals ==
Number of teams per tier entering this round
Eliteserien (1)	1. divisjon (2)	2. divisjon (3)	3. divisjon (4)	4. divisjon (5)	Total
4 / 16	0 / 16	0 / 28	0 / 84	0 / 298	4 / 442

30 October 2019	Viking (1)	3–0	(1) Ranheim	Stavanger
20:00 CET (UTC+1)	Thorstvedt 8'; Ibrahimaj 38'; Källman 52'	Report		Stadium: Viking Stadion; Attendance: 15,197; Referee: Trond Ivar Døvle (Fjellhamar FK)

31 October 2019	Odd (1)	0–3	(1) Haugesund	Skien
20:00 CET (UTC+1)		Report	Sandberg 49' (pen.); Samuelsen 83'; Tronstad 89'	Stadium: Skagerak Arena; Attendance: 8,702; Referee: Tore Hansen (Feda IL)

== Final ==
8 December 2019
13:15 CET (UTC+1)

Haugesund	0–1	Viking
	Report	Tripić 51' (pen.)

Ullevaal Stadion, Oslo
Attendance: 21,895
Referee: Espen Eskås (Bækkelaget)

== Scorers ==
7 goals:

- (Norway) Martin Samuelsen - Haugesund

6 goals:

- (Norway) Tobias Lauritsen - Odd

5 goals:

- (Norway) Oscar Aga - Stabæk

4 goals:

- (Norway) Omar Fonstad el Ghaouti - Bryne

3 goals:

- (Chile) Niklas Castro - Aalesund
- (Norway) Julius Skaug - Asker
- (Norway) Brage Berg Pedersen - Alta
- (Norway) Henrik Kjelsrud Johansen - Brann
- (France) Amadou Konaté - Bodø/Glimt
- (Norway) Vetle Myhre - Bryne
- (Norway) Mame Mor Ndiaye - Fram
- (Norway) Tim André Nilsen - Fredrikstad
- (Norway) Moses Mawa - KFUM Oslo
- (Norway) Adem Güven - Kongsvinger
- (Sweden) Daniel Gustavsson - Lillestrøm
- (Norway) Fredrik Brustad - Mjøndalen
- (Norway) Sondre Johansen - Mjøndalen
- (Norway) Eirik Ulland Andersen - Molde
- (Nigeria) Leke James - Molde
- (Norway) Marcus Mehnert - Nest-Sotra
- (Norway) Filip Delaveris - Odd
- (Norway) Granit Shala - Pors
- (Norway) Mads Reginiussen - Ranheim
- (Norway) Kent Håvard Eriksen - Sandnes Ulf
- (Norway) Håvard Segtnan Thun - Strømmen
- (Norway) Sander Finjord Ringberg - Tromsdalen
- (Denmark) Oliver Kjærgaard - Tromsø
- (Norway) Finn Badou Jor - Ullern
- (Norway) Bård Finne - Vålerenga
- (Norway) Kristian Thorstvedt - Viking
- (Norway) Zlatko Tripić - Viking

2 goals:

- (Norway) Torbjørn Agdestein - Aalesund
- (Iceland) Hólmbert Friðjónsson - Aalesund
- (Norway) Henrik Udahl - Åsane
- (Norway) Jens Petter Hauge - Bodø/Glimt
- (Norway) Andreas Mjøs - Brann
- (Norway) Sondre Sandnes Beite - Brattvåg
- (Norway) Erik Rosland - Bryne
- (Norway) Daniel Berg - Bærum
- (Norway) Erik Nordengen - Elverum
- (New Zealand) Moses Dyer - Florø
- (Norway) Andreas Hagen - Fredrikstad
- (Norway) Erik Huseklepp - Fyllingsdalen
- (Norway) Oliver Edvardsen - Grorud
- (Norway) Torbjørn Kallevåg - Haugesund
- (Mali) Ibrahima Koné - Haugesund
- (Norway) Kevin Martin Krygård - Haugesund
- (Norway) Niklas Sandberg - Haugesund
- (Norway) Kristoffer Velde - Haugesund
- (Norway) Walid Idrissi - Kjelsås
- (Norway) Fisnik Kastrati - KFUM Oslo
- (Norway) Stian Sortevik - KFUM Oslo
- (Norway) David Tavakoli - Skeid/KFUM Oslo
- (Norway) Bendik Bye - Kristiansund
- (Norway) Peder Nomell - Kvik Halden
- (Norway) Øystein Lundblad Næsheim - Kvik Halden
- (Sweden) Granit Buzuku - Levanger
- (Norway) Didrik Ziabi Sereba - Levanger
- (Norway) Vegard Voll - Levanger
- (Norway) Thomas Lehne Olsen - Lillestrøm
- (Norway) Riki Alba - Lørenskog
- (Norway) Stian Aasmundsen - Mjøndalen
- (Norway) Jakob Nyland Ørsahl - Molde
- (Norway) Shadi Ali - Moss
- (Norway) Tim André Reinback - Moss
- (Norway) Alexander Dang - Nest-Sotra
- (Norway) Mads Berg Sande - Nest-Sotra
- (Norway) Torgeir Børven - Odd
- (Norway) Vebjørn Hoff - Odd
- (Norway) Kristian Bjørseth - Oppsal
- (Norway) Magnus Blakstad - Ranheim
- (Norway) Ola Solbakken - Ranheim
- (Norway) Ivar Sollie Rønning - Ranheim
- (Norway) Erik Botheim - Rosenborg
- (Norway) Mohamed Ofkir - Sandefjord
- (Norway) Lars-Jørgen Salvesen - Sarpsborg 08
- (Norway) Ayoub Aleesami - Skeid
- (Norway) Johnny Buduson - Skeid
- (Norway) David Hickson - Skeid
- (Norway) Joachim Soltvedt - Sogndal
- (Norway) Ole Amund Sveen - Sogndal
- (Ivory Coast) Franck Boli - Stabæk
- (Ghana) Raymond Gyasi - Stabæk
- (Norway) Martin Rønning Ovenstad - Strømsgodset
- (Norway) Sebastian Pedersen - Strømsgodset
- (Norway) Amahl Pellegrino - Strømsgodset
- (Norway) Gard Ragnar Killingberg - Tiller
- (Norway) Lars Henrik Andreassen - Tromsdalen
- (Costa Rica) Brayan Rojas - Tromsø
- (Norway) Fitim Azemi - Vålerenga
- (Iceland) Matthías Vilhjálmsson - Vålerenga
- (Norway) Zymer Bytyqi - Viking
- (Iceland) Samúel Friðjónsson - Viking
- (Norway) Tommy Høiland - Viking
- (Kosovo) Ylldren Ibrahimaj - Viking

1 goal:

- (Norway) Sondre Brunstad Fet - Aalesund
- (Norway) Ståle Steen Sæthre - Aalesund
- (Iceland) Aron Elís Þrándarson - Aalesund
- (Norway) Dag Andreas Ytrehauge Balto - Alta
- (Norway) Håvard Nome - Alta
- (Norway) Christian Reginiussen - Alta
- (Scotland) Kyle Spence - Alta
- (Norway) Ulrik Berglann - Arendal
- (Denmark) Andreas Bruhn Christensen - Arendal
- (Norway) Kim Kvaalen - Arendal
- (Norway) Martin Mjelde Tysse - Arna-Bjørnar
- (Norway) Eivind Fallås Dahl - Asker
- (England) Aaron Lee Jones - Asker
- (Norway) Magnus Bruun-Hansen - Åsane
- (Norway) Simen Hopsdal - Åsane
- (Norway) Andreas Andersen - Åssiden
- (Norway) Steffen Egesund - Bergen Nord
- (Spain) José Isidoro - Bodø/Glimt
- (Iceland) Oliver Sigurjónsson - Bodø/Glimt
- (Norway) Ask Tjærandsen-Skau - Bodø/Glimt
- (Norway) Thomas Grøgaard - Brann
- (Bosnia and Herzegovina) Amer Ordagic - Brann
- (Norway) Azar Karadas - Brann
- (Norway) Petter Strand - Brann
- (Norway) Alexander Jonassen - Brattvåg
- (Norway) Håkon Bjørdal Leine - Brattvåg
- (Norway) Niklas Rekdal - Brattvåg
- (Iceland) Rógvi Baldvinsson - Bryne
- (Norway) Bjarne Langeland - Bryne
- (Nigeria) Chimaobi Ifejilika - Bærum
- (Norway) Lars Ivar Slemdal - Bærum
- (Norway) Kristoffer Sørensen - Bærum
- (Norway) Morten Bjørlo - Egersund
- (Norway) Kevin Jablinski - Egersund
- (Norway) Markus Naglestad - Egersund
- (The Gambia) Bob Sumareh - Egersund
- (Norway) Runar Flugheim Heggestad - Eidsvold Turn
- (Iceland) Ingólfur Örn Kristjánsson - Eidsvold Turn
- (Norway) Sondre Rustad Rudi - Eidsvold Turn
- (Norway) Magnus Solum - Elverum
- (Norway) Martin Hummervoll - Fana
- (Norway) Lars Christian Moldestad - Fana
- (Norway) Karsten Ellema Bjelde - Florø
- (Norway) Malvin Gjerde - Florø
- (Norway) Martin Indal Andersen - Fløy
- (Norway) Dardan Dreshaj - Fløy
- (Norway) Birk Berg-Johansen - Fløya
- (Norway) Peder Waldemar Mæhle - Fløya
- (Norway) Dan-Roger Roland - Fløya
- (Norway) Jonas Simonsen - Fløya
- (Norway) Islam Amir Darlishta - Follo
- (Norway) Henrik Byklum - Fram
- (Norway) Sindre Osestad - Fram
- (Norway) Herman Solberg Olsen - Fram
- (Norway) Ludvig Begby - Fredrikstad
- (Spain) Maikel - Fredrikstad
- (Norway) Nicolay Sandberg - Fredrikstad
- (Norway) Marius Skutle - Frøya
- (Norway) Morten Karlson - Frøyland
- (Norway) Ivar Mykkeltvedt - Fyllingsdalen
- (Norway) William Lloyd - Gjelleråsen
- (Norway) Per Kristian Jansen - Gjøvik-Lyn
- (Norway) Ole Thomas Skogli - Gjøvik-Lyn
- (Norway) Anas Farah Ali - Grorud
- (Norway) Thomas Elsebutangen - Grorud
- (Norway) Elias Kristoffersen Hagen - Grorud
- (Norway) Kevin Mankowitz - Grorud
- (Norway) Preben Mankowitz - Grorud
- (Norway) Jonas Enkerud - HamKam
- (Norway) Sebastian Andreassen - Harstad
- (Norway) Emil Galschiødt Kajander - Harstad
- (Norway) Marchus Strømøy Kajander - Harstad
- (Norway) Jonathan Damilola Olaoye - Harstad
- (Norway) Jakob Klæboe Pedersen - Harstad
- (Norway) Thore Pedersen - Haugesund
- (Norway) Sondre Tronstad - Haugesund
- (Norway) Anders Langåker Underhaug - Haugesund
- (Nigeria) Ibrahima Wadji - Haugesund
- (Norway) Ola Scheele Moe - Heming
- (Norway) Alf Jakob Aano - Hinna
- (Norway) Cairo Ico Nascimento Lima - Hinna
- (Senegal) Makhtar Thioune - Hinna
- (Norway) Håkon Botn Brautaset - Hødd
- (Norway) Bendik Rise - Hødd
- (England) Robin Shroot - Hødd
- (Norway) Preben Alexander Sætre - Hødd
- (Norway) Daniel Aase - Jerv
- (Norway) Martin Hoel Andersen - Jerv
- (Norway) Ole Marius Håbestad - Jerv
- (Norway) Abdul-Basit Agouda - KFUM Oslo
- (Norway) Lars Olden Larsen - KFUM Oslo
- (Norway) Yannis Maxitas Moula - KFUM Oslo
- (France) Emmanuel Troudart - KFUM Oslo
- (Norway) Magnus Aasarød - Kjelsås
- (Norway) Akinbola Akinyemi - Kjelsås
- (Norway) Jesper Solli - Kjelsås
- (Norway) Erik Rotlid - Kolstad
- (Norway) Markus Aanesland - Kongsvinger
- (Norway) Jonas Rønningen - Kongsvinger
- (Norway) Martin Vinjor - Kongsvinger
- (Senegal) Aliou Coly - Kristiansund
- (Sweden) Liridon Kalludra - Kristiansund
- (Kosovo) Flamur Kastrati - Kristiansund
- (Faroe Islands) Meinhard Olsen - Kristiansund
- (Norway) Sondre Sørli - Kristiansund
- (Norway) Magnus Krogsrud - Kråkerøy
- (Norway) Amani Dickson Mbedule - Kråkerøy
- (Norway) Deni Hasanagic - Kvik Halden
- (Norway) Dardan Mehmeti - Kvik Halden
- (Norway) Andreas Hegdahl Gundersen - Levanger
- (Sweden) Ermal Hajdari - Levanger
- (Sweden) Ivo Öjhage - Levanger
- (Norway) Sindre Sakshaug - Levanger
- (Montserrat) Alex Dyer - Lillestrøm
- (Denmark) Daniel A. Pedersen - Lillestrøm
- (Norway) Eskild Haugland Båsen - Lysekloster
- (Norway) Damian Kamil Garbacik - Lysekloster
- (Norway) Ole-Marius Forsberg - Lørenskog
- (Norway) Michael Singh - Lørenskog
- (Norway) Karl-Christian Karlsen - Melbo
- (Norway) Adrian Pedersen - Melbo
- (The Gambia) Jibril Bojang - Mjøndalen
- (Norway) Sondre Liseth - Mjøndalen
- (Canada) Olivier Occéan - Mjøndalen
- (Denmark) Christoffer Remmer - Molde
- (Sweden) Alagie Sanyang - Moss
- (Norway) Remi André Svindland - Moss
- (Norway) Christoffer Engan - Nardo
- (Norway) Jonas Tømmerdal Frøner - Nardo
- (Denmark) Daniel Arrocha - Nest-Sotra
- (Norway) Peter Sørensen Nergaard - Nest-Sotra
- (Norway) Thor Kristian Økland - Nest-Sotra
- (Norway) Tom Kristian Stavseth - Norild
- (Norway) Erlend Hustad - Notodden
- (Nigeria) Abubakar Aliyu Ibrahim - Notodden
- (Uruguay) Fabrizio Cardaccio Tambucho - Nybergsund
- (Norway) Joshua Kitolano - Odd
- (Norway) Espen Ruud - Odd
- (Norway) Jone Samuelsen - Odd
- (Norway) Sander Svendsen - Odd
- (Norway) Sami Loulanti - Oppsal
- (Norway) Simen Thorsen - Pors
- (Norway) Torbjørn Lysaker Heggem - Ranheim
- (Norway) Michael Karlsen - Ranheim
- (Norway) Daniel Kvande - Ranheim
- (Norway) Olaus Skarsem - Ranheim
- (Norway) Sondre Sørløkk - Ranheim
- (Norway) Erik Tønne - Ranheim
- (Norway) Glenn Walker - Ranheim
- (Norway) Parfait Bizoza - Raufoss
- (Singapore) Ikhsan Fandi - Raufoss
- (Sweden) Anton Henningsson - Raufoss
- (Denmark) Mikkel Maigaard - Raufoss
- (Norway) Matias Belli Moldskred - Raufoss
- (Norway) Gard Simenstad - Raufoss
- (Nigeria) Samuel Adegbenro - Rosenborg
- (Nigeria) David Akintola - Rosenborg
- (Norway) Anders Konradsen - Rosenborg
- (Norway) Birger Meling - Rosenborg
- (Norway) Tore Reginiussen - Rosenborg
- (Norway) Gustav Valsvik - Rosenborg
- (Norway) Gjermund Åsen - Rosenborg
- (Norway) Olav Andre Fausa - Rørvik
- (Norway) Lars Grorud - Sandefjord
- (Iceland) Viðar Ari Jónsson - Sandefjord
- (Norway) Stefan Mladenovic - Sandefjord
- (Norway) Bjørnar Holmvik - Sandnes Ulf
- (Denmark) Sanel Kapidzic - Sandnes Ulf
- (Norway) Jørgen Strand Larsen - Sarpsborg 08
- (Norway) Steffen Lie Skålevik - Sarpsborg 08
- (Norway) Alexander Ruud Tveter - Sarpsborg 08
- (Norway) Ahmed El-Amrani - Skeid
- (Norway) Mathias Dahl Abelsen - Skeid
- (Norway) Muhammed Adams - Skeid
- (Norway) Sander Flåte - Skeid
- (Norway) Johannes Nunez Godoy - Skeid
- (Norway) Saeed Ahmad Rahim - Skjetten
- (Norway) Lars Rydje - Skjetten
- (Norway) Ulrik Flo - Sogndal
- (Norway) Sigurd Haugen - Sogndal
- (Norway) Sixten Dalen Jensen - Sogndal
- (Norway) Per Magnus Steiring - Sogndal
- (Norway) Frederic Falck - Sotra
- (Norway) Kjetil Kalve - Sotra
- (Norway) Lars Kilen - Sotra
- (Norway) Jone Rugland - Sotra
- (Norway) Kristoffer Stava - Sotra
- (Norway) Sigurd Tafjord - Spjelkavik
- (Norway) Marius Myking Waagan - Spjelkavik
- (Norway) Daniel Braaten - Stabæk
- (Norway) Herman Geelmuyden - Stabæk
- (Ghana) Raymond Gyasi - Stabæk
- (Ivory Coast) Luc Kassi - Stabæk
- (Morocco) Youness Mokhtar - Stabæk
- (Norway) Hugo Vetlesen - Stabæk
- (Estonia) Madis Vihmann - Stabæk
- (Norway) Mats Lillebo - Stjørdals-Blink
- (Norway) Ola Rygg - Stjørdals-Blink
- (Norway) Nedzad Sisic - Stjørdals-Blink
- (Norway) Sivert Solli - Stjørdals-Blink
- (Norway) Martin Hagen - Storm
- (Norway) Thomas Pedersen - Storm
- (Norway) Sivert Stenseth Gussiås - Strømmen
- (Norway) Øystein Vestvatn - Strømmen
- (Norway) Mounir Hamoud - Strømsgodset
- (Norway) Mos - Strømsgodset
- (Norway) Stian Ringstad - Strømsgodset
- (Norway) Tor Erik Torske - Sunndal
- (Norway) Sindre Myrvold Welo - Tiller
- (Norway) Petter Senstad - Toten
- (Norway) Kodjo Somesi - Toten
- (Norway) Thomas Kind Bendiksen - Tromsdalen
- (Norway) Håkon Kjæve - Tromsdalen
- (Norway) Tomas Kritoffersen - Tromsdalen
- (Norway) Robin Lorentzen - Tromsdalen
- (Norway) Andreas Løvland - Tromsdalen
- (Norway) Adrian Sandbukt - Tromsdalen
- (Norway) Sigurd Grønli - Tromsø
- (Norway) Mikael Ingebrigtsen - Tromsø
- (Norway) August Mikkelsen - Tromsø
- (Norway) Lasse Nilsen - Tromsø
- (Norway) Eirik Saur Holte - Trygg/Lade
- (Norway) Eirik Wågan Selnes - Trygg/Lade
- (Norway) Edvard Khachatrjan - Træff
- (Norway) Stian Bjarnar Samdal - Træff
- (Norway) Simen Varhaugvik - Træff
- (Norway) Herman Henriksen - Ullensaker/Kisa
- (Norway) Eric Kitolano - Ullensaker/Kisa
- (Norway) Ole Kristian Langås - Ullensaker/Kisa
- (Norway) Ole Andreas Nesset - Ullensaker/Kisa
- (Norway) Sverre Økland - Ullensaker/Kisa
- (Norway) Martin Søreide - Ullensaker/Kisa
- (Norway) Martin Torp - Ullensaker/Kisa
- (Norway) Lars Austnes - Ullern
- (Norway) Eivind Stender - Ullern
- (Costa Rica) Deyver Vega - Vålerenga
- (Norway) Stian Barane - Vard Haugesund
- (Norway) Aleksander Gundersen - Vard Haugesund
- (Norway) Erik Skeie - Verdal
- (Norway) Steffen Klemetsen Jakobsen - Vidar
- (Norway) Johnny Furdal - Viking
- (Finland) Benjamin Källman - Viking
- (Norway) Even Østensen - Viking
- (Norway) Fredrik Torsteinbø - Viking
- (Norway) Rolf Daniel Vikstøl - Viking

Own goals:

- (Norway) Glenn Mjelde Håberg - Kjelsås (22 May 2019 vs Skeid)
- (Norway) Andreas Slungård Rushfeldt - Norild (1 May 2019 vs Tromsø)
- (United States) Stefan Antonijevic - Sogndal (19 June 2019 vs Brann)
- (Norway) Mounir Hamoud - Strømsgodset (19 June 2019 vs Fram)
- (Norway) Adrian Reinholt Jensen - Åga (1 May 2019 vs Bodø/Glimt)
- (Norway) Benjamin Fabian Stokholm Ravndal - Ålgård (1 May 2019 vs Bryne)
