= Zymer Bytyqi =

Professional footballer

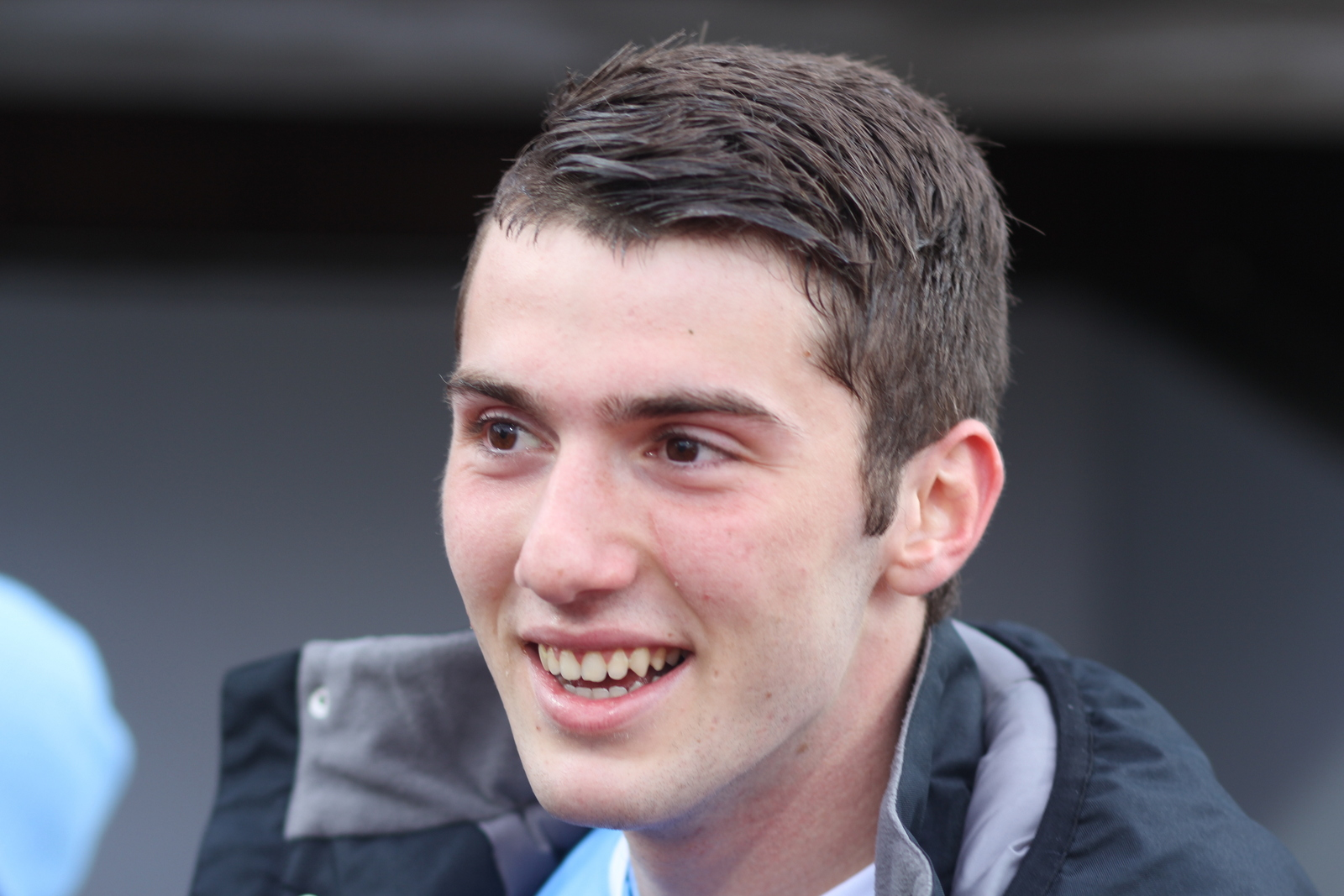
- Bytyqi with Sandnes Ulf in May 2013

Personal information
- Full name: Zymer Bytyqi
- Date of birth: 11 September 1996 (age 30)
- Place of birth: Sint-Truiden, Belgium
- Height: 1.76 m (5 ft 9 in)
- Position: Winger

Team information
- Current team: Kristiansund
- Number: 11

Youth career
- 2006–2009: Lura
- 2009–2012: Sandnes Ulf

Senior career*
Years	Team	Apps	(Gls)
2012–2013	Sandnes Ulf	5	(0)
2013–2015	Red Bull Salzburg	0	(0)
2013–2014	→ Sandnes Ulf (loan)	22	(0)
2015–2020	Viking	140	(20)
2020–2023	Konyaspor	75	(10)
2023	Olympiacos	2	(0)
2023–2024	Antalyaspor	29	(1)
2024–2025	CSKA Sofia	17	(4)
2026–	Kristiansund	7	(1)

International career^{‡}
2011	Norway U15	3	(1)
2012	Norway U16	11	(2)
2013	Norway U17	9	(3)
2013–2014	Norway U18	11	(1)
2014–2015	Norway U19	9	(0)
2015	Norway U21	1	(0)
2014–	Kosovo	26	(1)
- * Club domestic league appearances and goals as of 17:07, 1 November 2026 (UTC) ‡ National team caps and goals as of 18 November 2024 (UTC)

Zymer Bytyqi (born 11 September 1996) is a professional footballer who plays as a winger for Kristiansund. Born in Belgium, he represents the Kosovo national team.

He previously played for Sandnes Ulf and Red Bull Salzburg, and became the youngest player that has ever played in the Norwegian top league when he made his first-team debut in 2012 (the record has since been broken by Martin Ødegaard).

== Club career ==
=== Early career and Sandnes Ulf ===
Bytyqi was born in Belgium to Kosovar immigrants, but moved to Norway at the age of 2. He did not play football before he was 10 years old, when he started to play for Lura IL before he moved to Sandnes Ulf ahead of the 2010 season. In 2011, he played several matches for Sandnes Ulf's reserve team in the Third Division. He also trained with the first team but was ineligible for play in the First Division because of his young age. He gave an impressive performance for Norway U15 in September 2011, partly by scoring the winning goal in one of the matches, and joined Newcastle United on a week-long trial in October 2011. His agent, Jim Solbakken, stated that despite the interest from bigger clubs, it would be best for Bytyqi's development to stay at Sandnes Ulf.

Bytyqi signed a professional one-year contract with Sandnes Ulf in January 2012, and head coach Asle Andersen said that he had never seen such a talented striker, and that he would get his chance in Tippeligaen, following Sandnes Ulf' promotion to the top league. Bytyqi played for Sandnes Ulf during their pre-season, and he also scored a goal in the 6–0 win against Randaberg. After a very solid game for Norway U16 in April 2012, Sandnes Ulf's Director Tom Rune Espedal confirmed interest from English, German and Dutch clubs, but that no club had yet made an offer for Bytyqi, and that they most likely would sell the talented player during the summer. Bytyqi stated that his big dream was to play professionally abroad, but that he would not leave Norway without his family.

When Sandnes Ulf's forwards Tommy Høiland, Vetle Myhre and Gilles Mbang Ondo was out with injury, Bytyqi was included in the squad for the match against Haugesund on 28 May 2012, and made his debut for Sandnes Ulf when he came on as a substitute in the 77th minute. This made him the youngest player in the top league of Norway, aged 15 years, 261 days, beating Sverre Økland's (aged 16 years and 1 day) old record from 2009. The record was broken on 13 April 2015, when Martin Ødegaard made his debut for Strømsgodset aged 15 years and 118 days.

In August 2012, Bytyqi was called up for the Norwegian U16-team, a decision that neither Sandnes Ulf or the player was happy about, as Bytyqi could have played the league-game against Lillestrøm and even made his first appearance in the starting line-up due to injuries.

=== Red Bull Salzburg and return to Sandnes Ulf as loan ===
On 23 August 2012, Bytyqi signed a three-year precontract with Austrian Bundesliga club Red Bull Salzburg and this transfer would become legally effective in January 2013. Red Bull Salzburg reportedly paid a 5 million krone transfer fee. On 9 March 2013, he was sent back on loan to Tippeligaen club Sandnes Ulf for the remainder of the season. On 1 May 2013, he played the first game after the return in the 2013 Norwegian Cup second round against Flekkerøy after being named in the starting line-up.

=== Viking ===
On 6 January 2015, Bytyqi signed a three-year contract with Tippeligaen club Viking and received squad number 27. Three months later, he made his debut in a 1–0 away defeat against Mjøndalen after coming on as a substitute at 70th minute in place of Samuel Adegbenro.

=== Konyaspor ===
On 8 January 2021, Bytyqi signed a two-and-a-half-year contract with Süper Lig club Konyaspor and received squad number 14. Two days later, he made his debut against Fatih Karagümrük after coming on as a substitute at 75th minute in place of Deni Milošević, and assists in his side's only goal during a 2–1 away defeat.

=== Olympiacos ===
On 1 February 2023, Bytyqi joined Super League Greece side Olympiacos. Olympiacos reportedly paid a €1 million transfer fee.

=== Antalyaspor ===
On 1 August 2023, Bytyqi signed a three-year contract with Süper Lig club Antalyaspor.

== International career ==
From 2011, until 2015, Bytyqi has been part of Norway at youth international level, respectively has been part of the U15, U16, U17, U18, U19 and U21 teams and he with these teams played 44 matches and scored 7 goals. Whereas, on 2 March 2014, Bytyqi received a call-up from Kosovo for the first permitted by FIFA match against Haiti, and made his debut after coming on as a substitute at 57th minute in place of Ilir Azemi.

== Career statistics ==
=== Club ===
As of match played 1 November 2026

Appearances and goals by club, season and competition
Club	Season	League			Cup		Continental (Note: Including continental competitions, such as UEFA Champions League and UEFA Europa League)		Other		Total	
Club	Season	Division	Apps	Goals	Apps	Goals	Apps	Goals	Apps	Goals	Apps	Goals
Sandnes Ulf	2012	Eliteserien	5	0	0	0	—		—		5	0
Sandnes Ulf	2013 (loan)	Eliteserien	15	0	1	0	—		—		16	0
Sandnes Ulf	2014 (loan)	Eliteserien	7	0	1	0	—		—		8	0
Sandnes Ulf	Total		27	0	2	0	—		0	0	29	0
Viking	2015	Eliteserien	21	4	4	1	—		—		25	5
Viking	2016	Eliteserien	18	0	2	0	—		—		20	0
Viking	2017	Eliteserien	25	1	0	0	—		—		25	1
Viking	2018	1. divisjon	19	3	2	0	—		—		21	3
Viking	2019	Eliteserien	28	2	6	2	—		—		34	4
Viking	2020	Eliteserien	29	10	—		1	0	—		30	10
Viking	Total		140	20	14	3	1	0	0	0	155	23
Konyaspor	2020–21	Süper Lig	19	2	2	0	—		—		21	2
Konyaspor	2021–22	Süper Lig	37	8	2	0	—		—		39	8
Konyaspor	2022–23	Süper Lig	19	0	1	0	3	1	—		23	1
Konyaspor	Total		75	10	5	0	3	1	0	0	83	11
Olympiacos	2022–23	Super League Greece	2	0	1	0	—		—		3	0
Antalyaspor	2023–24	Süper Lig	29	1	4	1	—		—		33	4
CSKA Sofia	2024–25	First League	16	4	3	1	–		1	0	20	5
CSKA Sofia	2025–26	First League	1	0	0	0	–		0	0	1	0
CSKA Sofia	Total		17	4	3	1	0	0	1	0	21	5
Kristiansund	2026	Eliteserien	7	1	2	0	—		—		9	1
Career total			267	35	25	4	4	1	1	0	297	40

=== International ===
As of match played 18 November 2024

Appearances and goals by national team, year and competition
National team	Year	Apps	Goals
Kosovo
Kosovo	2014	1	0
Kosovo	2020	1	0
Kosovo	2021	7	0
Kosovo	2022	8	1
Kosovo	2023	5	0
Kosovo	2024	4	0
Total		26	1

International goals

Scores and results list Kosovo's goal tally first, score column indicates score after each Bytyqi goal.

List of international goals scored by Zymer Bytyqi
No.	Date	Venue	Opponent	Score	Result	Competition
1	9 June 2022	Fadil Vokrri Stadium, Pristina, Kosovo	Northern Ireland	2–0	3–2	2022–23 UEFA Nations League C

== Honours ==
Viking

- 1. divisjon: 2018
- Norwegian Cup: 2019
