= 2013–14 CS Pandurii Târgu Jiu season =

Pandurii Târgu Jiu
2013–14 season
- Chairman: Marin Condescu
- Head coach: Cristian Pustai
- Stadium: Tudor Vladimirescu
- Liga I: 4th
- Cupa României: Round of 32
- UEFA Europa League: Group stage
Home colours	Away colours	Third colours

The 2013–14 season will be Pandurii Târgu Jiu's 50th season in the Romanian football league system, and their eighth consecutive season in Liga I.

They finished second in the 2012–13 Liga I. Pandurii competed in UEFA Europa League, their first European participation ever, playing in the group stage.

== Players ==
=== First-team squad ===
Note: Flags indicate national team as defined under FIFA eligibility rules; some limited exceptions apply. Players may hold more than one non-FIFA nationality.

No.	Pos.	Nation	Player
1	GK	ROU	David Lazar
3	DF	GEQ	Sipo
4	DF	SRB	Marko Momčilović
5	DF	CYP	Paraskevas Christou (captain)
6	DF	ROU	Iulian Mamele
7	MF	ROU	Alin Buleică
8	MF	ROU	Călin Cristea
9	FW	BRA	Alex dos Santos
10	MF	BRA	Eric
11	FW	MNE	Admir Adrović
18	DF	ROU	Bogdan Ungurușan
19	MF	ROU	Paul Anton
20	MF	ROU	Cornel Predescu

No.	Pos.	Nation	Player
21	DF	BRA	Erico
22	MF	ARG	David Distéfano
23	DF	ROU	Ionuț Rada
25	DF	ROU	Marian Pleașcă
26	MF	ROU	Viorel Nicoară
28	MF	SUR	Nicandro Breeveld
32	FW	CHI	Diego Rubio
33	GK	ROU	Răzvan Stanca
77	MF	POR	Paulinho
80	GK	POR	Pedro Mingote
90	MF	ROU	Alexandru Ciucur
99	FW	LTU	Deivydas Matulevičius
—	FW	LBN	Feiz Shamsin

== Competitions ==
Win Draw Loss

=== Liga I ===
==== League table ====
Pos	Team	Pld	W	D	L	GF	GA	GD	Pts	Qualification or relegation
5	CFR Cluj	34	13	12	9	44	33	+11	51	Qualification to Europa League second qualifying round
6	Vaslui (R)	34	15	6	13	38	32	+6	51	Relegation to Liga IV (Note: Vaslui did not receive a license for financial reasons. Dinamo București filed for insolvency, thus didn't get an UEFA licence. CFR Cluj got their Europa League spot.)
7	Pandurii Târgu Jiu	34	14	8	12	59	39	+20	50	
8	Botoșani	34	12	7	15	36	52	−16	43	
9	Ceahlăul Piatra Neamț	34	10	11	13	27	31	−4	41 (Note: OȚE 0-1 CEA; CEA 2-0 OȚE)	

Source: Liga I (in Romanian)
Rules for classification: 1) points; 2) goal difference; 3) number of goals scored.
(R) Relegated

==== Results summary ====
Overall								Home						Away					
Pld	W	D	L	GF	GA	GD	Pts	W	D	L	GF	GA	GD	W	D	L	GF	GA	GD
7	4	3	0	9	4	+5	15	1	3	0	4	2	+2	3	0	0	5	2	+3

Last updated: 25 August 2013.
Source: www.pandurii-tg-jiu.ro

=== UEFA Europa League ===
==== Qualifying rounds ====
===== Second qualifying round =====
16 July 2013 First leg	Levadia Tallinn (Estonia)	0–0	(Romania) Pandurii Târgu Jiu	Kadriorg Stadium, Tallinn
18:00		Report		Attendance: 2,848; Referee: Marco Borg (Malta)

25 July 2013 Second leg	Pandurii Târgu Jiu (Romania)	4–0 (4–0 agg.)	(Estonia) Levadia Tallinn	Tudor Vladimirescu, Târgu Jiu
19:00	Matulevičius 7'; Erico 35', 57'; Breeveld 39'	Report		Attendance: 4,270; Referee: Tamás Bognár (Hungary)

===== Third qualifying round =====
1 August 2013 First leg	Pandurii Târgu Jiu (Romania)	1–1	(Israel) Hapoel Tel Aviv	Cluj Arena, Cluj-Napoca
20:00	Nistor 4'	Report	Sasha 29'	Attendance: 4,996; Referee: Vitali Meshkov (Russia)

8 August 2013 Second leg	Hapoel Tel Aviv (Israel)	1–2 (2–3 agg.)	(Romania) Pandurii Târgu Jiu	Bloomfield Stadium, Tel Aviv
19:00	Damari 21' (pen.)	Report	Eric 34'; Ciucur 50'	Attendance: 6,700; Referee: Paolo Valeri (Italy)

==== Play-off round ====
22 August 2013 First leg	Pandurii Târgu Jiu (Romania)	0–1	(Portugal) Braga	Cluj Arena, Cluj-Napoca
20:00		Report	Yazalde 51'	Attendance: 11,500; Referee: Florian Meyer (Germany)

29 August 2013 Second leg	Braga (Portugal)	0–2 (a.e.t.) (1–2 agg.)	(Romania) Pandurii Târgu Jiu	Estádio Municipal, Braga
21:30		Report	Buleică 15'; Ciucur 117'	Attendance: 11,312; Referee: Liran Liany (Israel)

==== Group stage ====
Group E

19 September 2013 Second leg	Pandurii Târgu Jiu (Romania)	0–1	(Ukraine) Dnipro Dnipropetrovsk	Cluj Arena, Cluj-Napoca
19:00		Report	Rotan 38'	Attendance: 8,000; Referee: Sascha Kever (Switzerland)

3 October 2013	Paços de Ferreira (Portugal)	1–1	(Romania) Pandurii Târgu Jiu	Estádio D. Afonso Henriques, Guimarães
21:05	Rui Miguel 49'	Report	Momčilović 5'	Attendance: 1,314; Referee: Aleksei Nikolaev (Russia)

24 October 2013	Fiorentina (Italy)	v	(Romania) Pandurii Târgu Jiu	Stadio Artemio Franchi, Florence
21:05		Report

7 November 2013	Pandurii Târgu Jiu (Romania)	v	(Italy) Fiorentina	Cluj Arena, Cluj-Napoca
19:00		Report

28 November 2013	Dnipro Dnipropetrovsk (Ukraine)	v	(Romania) Pandurii Târgu Jiu	Dnipro-Arena, Dnipropetrovsk
21:05		Report
