= Diego Rubio (footballer) =

Chilean footballer (born 1993)

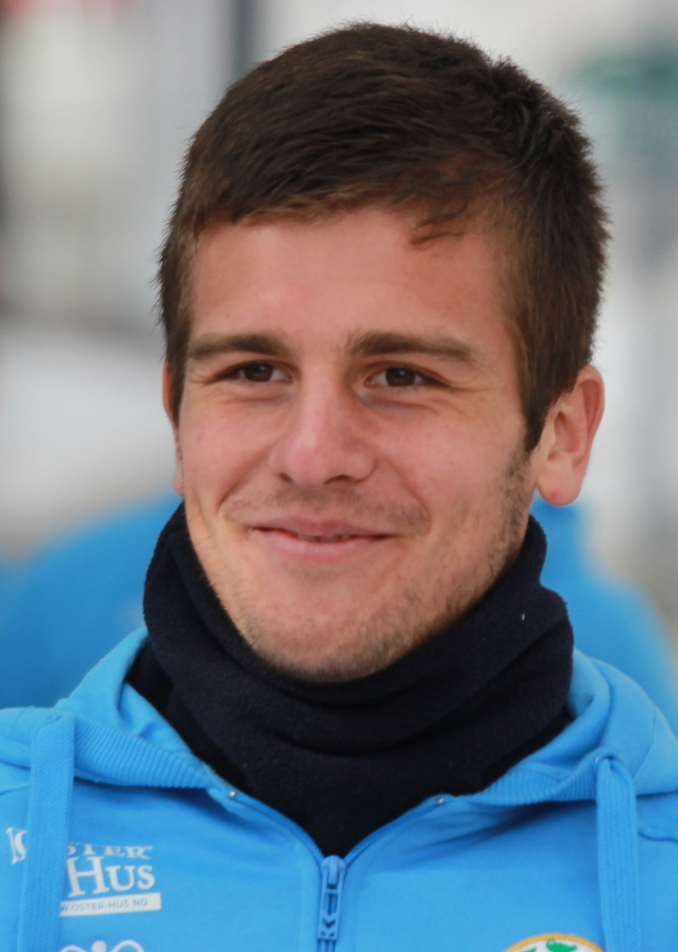
- Rubio with Sandnes Ulf in 2014

Personal information
- Full name: Diego Iván Rubio Köstner
- Date of birth: 15 May 1993 (age 33)
- Place of birth: Santiago, Chile
- Height: 1.80 m (5 ft 11 in)
- Position: Striker

Team information
- Current team: Deportes La Serena

Youth career
- 2005–2007: Universidad Católica
- 2007–2010: Colo-Colo

Senior career*
Years	Team	Apps	(Gls)
2010–2011	Colo-Colo	8	(3)
2011–2015	Sporting CP	11	(1)
2012–2015	Sporting CP B	52	(22)
2013	→ Pandurii Târgu Jiu (loan)	4	(0)
2014	→ Sandnes Ulf (loan)	26	(8)
2015–2016	Valladolid	13	(0)
2016	→ Sporting Kansas City (loan)	13	(1)
2016	→ Swope Park Rangers (loan)	1	(1)
2016–2018	Sporting Kansas City	38	(14)
2017–2018	→ Swope Park Rangers	6	(2)
2019–2023	Colorado Rapids	114	(38)
2022	Colorado Rapids 2	1	(1)
2024–2025	Austin FC	58	(6)
2026–	Deportes La Serena	13	(3)

International career^{‡}
2013	Chile U20	8	(1)
2011–	Chile	12	(0)
- * Club domestic league appearances and goals as of 9 July 2026 ‡ National team caps and goals as of 17 October 2023

Diego Iván Rubio Köstner (born 15 May 1993) is a Chilean professional footballer who plays as a striker for Deportes La Serena.

== Club career ==
=== Early career ===
Rubio began his football career with Universidad Católica. However, when he was 14, he took the decision to move to his favorite team Colo-Colo. After one year in the bench with Colo-Colo, in the next season Diego was consecrated in the youth team. After many seasons in the youth ranks, he was promoted to the first professional team in January 2011.

=== Colo-Colo ===
Rubio made his professional debut for Colo-Colo in a pre-season friendly against Deportes La Serena as a starter. In other pre-season game, Diego scored his first unofficial goals for the club, in a 3–1 win against Unión Española, in where he scored two goals for his team, being named the man of the match.

His Chilean Primera División came on 14 February 2011 against Unión San Felipe, as an 84th-minute substitution in a 2–0 away defeat. In a Copa Libertadores game played against Santos in Brazil, he scored his first professional goal, but the match finished in a 3–2 loss. On 19 April, Rubio scored his first two goals in the Primera División against La Serena, at 30th and 62nd minute, being named the man of match, in a 4–1 home win. He finally was consecrated in the club in an international game for the Libertadores against Táchira, Rubio gave the 2–1 victory to the club, scoring the two goals of Colo-Colo, after an early goal of Edgar Pérez Greco at 4th minute. After his club's performances, was rumored that Udinese are interested in Rubio.

He played his first derby game against his former youth club Universidad Católica, participating in the equalizer goal of Colo-Colo giving an assistance to Ezequiel Miralles at 81st minute, putting the 1–1 draw. The coach Américo Gallego nominated to Rubio for play the major derby of the Chilean football against Universidad de Chile, however, he only playing 30 minutes in a 2–1 loss.

=== Sporting CP ===
On 5 July 2011, Rubio joined Portuguese club Sporting Clube de Portugal for €1.5 million, signing a five-year contract with a €30 million minimum fee release clause.

==== Loan to Pandurii ====
On 2 September 2013, Romanian Liga I club Pandurii Târgu Jiu confirmed Rubio was signed on a loan from Sporting, with an option to buy. He debuted in Liga I in the match against Dinamo Bucharest, won by Pandurii 2–1.

==== Loan to Sandnes Ulf ====
On 3 February 2014, Rubio joined Tippeligaen side Sandnes Ulf on a season-long loan.

=== Valladolid ===
On 31 August 2015, aged 22, signed a four-year contract with Spanish club Real Valladolid.

=== Sporting Kansas City ===
On 8 March 2016, Rubio signed a season-long loan with Major League Soccer side Sporting Kansas City as a Designated Player.

He signed with the club on a permanent deal on 1 September 2016.

=== Colorado Rapids ===
Ahead of the 2019 season, Rubio was traded to Colorado Rapids in exchange for Kelyn Rowe, $200,000 of General Allocation Money and $100,000 of Target Allocation Money. On 20 February 2019, Rubio signed a three-year contract extension through the 2022 season. Rubio enjoyed a career year with Colorado in 2019. He was the club's second leading scorer with 11 goals in 25 starts among 26 appearances—all MLS career highs.

In 2020, Rubio appeared in 17 matches, starting 13, in the regular season and playoffs. Rubio scored three goals, including game-winning goals on 12 Sep against Real Salt Lake and 8 Nov at Houston Dynamo. He also added four assists, including game-winning assists on Opening Day against D.C. United and on 4 Nov to clinch a playoff berth at Portland Timbers. Rubio was named to the MLS Team of the Week in Weeks 11 and 24. Rubio left Colorado following their 2023 season.

=== Austin FC ===
On 5 February 2024, Rubio signed as a free agent with Austin FC on a one-year deal. He left them at the end of the 2025 season.

=== Deportes La Serena ===
Back to Chile, Rubio signed with Deportes La Serena on 29 January 2026.

== International career ==
On 31 May 2011, Rubio was called up by Chile national team manager Claudio Borghi to take part in the 28-man pre-list preparatory process for the upcoming 2011 Copa América. He officially debuted with Chile national team on 23 June 2011, in a match against Paraguay, the last match of Chile before the Copa América.

Rubio returned to the national team and appeared in a 0-0 friendly draw against South Korea on 11 September 2018. Rubio was a substitute in a 1-1 friendly draw against the United States on 26 March 2019. Rubio picked up an assist on Alfonso Parat's goal in a 2-1 friendly loss to Honduras on 10 September 2019, Rubio's first 90-minute performance on the senior international stage. On 6 November 2020, Rubio was called up for Chile's 2022 FIFA World Cup Qualifiers against Peru and Venezuela, but was later released from the squad out of precautions over COVID-19.

== Personal life ==
Diego is the grandson of Ildefonso Rubio, a historical goalkeeper of Rangers de Talca, and the son of Hugo Rubio. Currently working at the Passball company as a football agent, Hugo was a successful football player, having spent most of his extensive career in his country with a short spell in European football, specifically in Italy and Switzerland. Hugo also was a member of the Chile squad at the Copa América of 1987 and 1991. Diego has two footballer brothers, Eduardo, who was a Chile international at senior level, and Matías, who was a Chile international at under-20 level. Diego Rubio is also godchild of the Chilean football legend Iván Zamorano.

On 15 May 2011, was reported that Rubio was on a list of most popular Chilean players on Twitter with 1,247 fans, in the 12th place of 14 players. The list was led by Jorge Valdivia, in the 1st place with more of 50,000 fans.

On 24 May 2013, Diego got married with Rocío Navarro in Seville and on 6 June 2014 his first son Thiago was born.

Rubio earned his U.S. green card in September 2017. This status also qualifies him as a domestic player for MLS roster purposes.

== Career statistics ==
=== Club ===
As of 4 October 2025

Appearances and goals by club, season and competition
Club	Season	League			National cup (Note: Includes Taça de Portugal, Cupa României, Norwegian Football Cup, Copa del Rey, U.S. Open Cup)		League cup (Note: Includes Taça da Liga)		Continental		Other		Total	
Club	Season	Division	Apps	Goals	Apps	Goals	Apps	Goals	Apps	Goals	Apps	Goals	Apps	Goals
Colo-Colo	2011	Primera División	7	2	0	0	–		2 (Note: Appearances in Copa Libertadores)	3	1 (Note: Appearance in Apertura play-offs)	1	10	6
Sporting CP	2011–12	Primeira Liga	9	1	1	0	1	0	6 (Note: Appearances in UEFA Europa League)	0	–		17	1
Sporting CP	2012–13	Primeira Liga	2	0	0	0	0	0	0	0	–		2	0
Sporting CP	2013–14	Primeira Liga	0	0	0	0	0	0	–		–		0	0
Sporting CP	2014–15	Primeira Liga	0	0	0	0	1	0	0	0	–		1	0
Sporting CP	2015–16	Primeira Liga	0	0	0	0	0	0	0	0	0	0	0	0
Sporting CP	Total		11	1	1	0	2	0	6	0	0	0	20	1
Sporting CP B	2012–13	Segunda Liga	26	8	–		–		–		–		26	8
Sporting CP B	2014–15	Segunda Liga	21	14	–		–		–		–		21	14
Sporting CP B	2015–16	LigaPro	5	0	–		–		–		–		5	0
Sporting CP B	Total		52	22	–		–		–		–		52	22
Pandurii Târgu Jiu (loan)	2013–14	Liga I	4	0	1	0	–		–		–		5	0
Sandnes Ulf (loan)	2014	Tippeligaen	26	8	1	0	–		–		–		27	8
Valladolid	2015–16	Segunda División	13	0	1	0	–		–		–		14	0
Sporting Kansas City (loan)	2016	Major League Soccer	13	1	2	1	–		2 (Note: Appearances in the CONCACAF Champions League)	0	0	0	17	2
Swope Park Rangers (loan)	2016	United Soccer League	1	1	–		–		–		0	0	1	1
Sporting Kansas City	2016	Major League Soccer	2	0	0	0	–		1	1	0	0	3	1
Sporting Kansas City	2017	Major League Soccer	16	6	3	1	–		–		1 (Note: Appearances in MLS Cup playoffs)	0	20	7
Sporting Kansas City	2018	Major League Soccer	20	8	2	0	–		–		3	2	25	10
Sporting Kansas City	Total		38	14	5	1	–		1	1	4	2	48	18
Swope Park Rangers	2016	United Soccer League	1	0	–		–		–		–		1	0
Swope Park Rangers	2017	United Soccer League	2	1	–		–		–		–		2	1
Swope Park Rangers	2018	United Soccer League	3	1	–		–		–		–		3	1
Swope Park Rangers	Total		6	2	–		–		–		–		6	2
Colorado Rapids	2019	Major League Soccer	26	11	1	1	–		–		0	0	27	12
Colorado Rapids	2020	Major League Soccer	16	3	–		–		–		1	0	17	3
Colorado Rapids	2021	Major League Soccer	26	5	–		–		–		1	0	27	5
Colorado Rapids	2022	Major League Soccer	30	16	1	0	–		2 (Note: Appearances in CONCACAF Champions League)	0	–		33	16
Colorado Rapids	2023	Major League Soccer	16	3	0	0	–		–		1 (Note: Appearance(s) in Leagues Cup)	1	17	4
Colorado Rapids	Total		114	38	2	1	–		2	0	3	1	121	40
Austin FC	2024	Major League Soccer	33	4	–		–		–		3	0	36	4
Austin FC	2025	Major League Soccer	25	2	5	0	–		–		–		30	2
Austin FC	Total		58	5	5	0	–		–		3	0	66	6
Career total			343	95	18	3	2	0	13	4	11	4	387	106

=== International ===
As of 2 March 2024

Appearances and goals by national team and year
National team	Year	Apps	Goals
Chile	2011	3	0
Chile	2012	0	0
Chile	2013	0	0
Chile	2014	0	0
Chile	2015	0	0
Chile	2016	0	0
Chile	2017	0	0
Chile	2018	1	0
Chile	2019	5	0
Chile	2020	0	0
Chile	2021	0	0
Chile	2022	2	0
Chile	2023	1	0
Total		12	0

== Honours ==
Sporting Kansas City

- U.S. Open Cup: 2017
