= Kenneth Sola =

Norwegian footballer (born 1985)

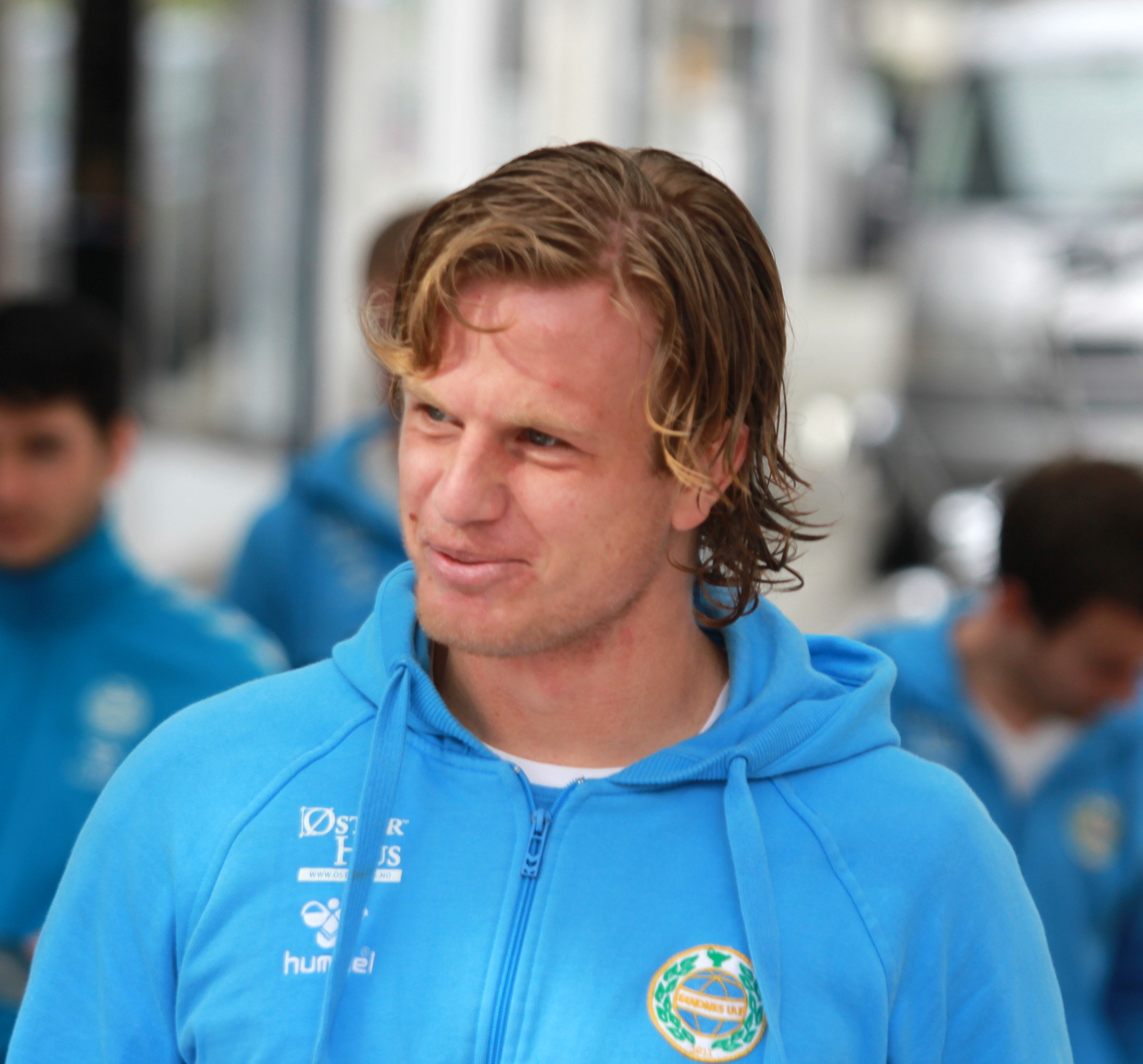

Personal information
- Date of birth: 25 August 1985 (age 41)
- Place of birth: Stavanger, Norway
- Height: 1.83 m (6 ft 0 in)
- Position: Defender

Team information
- Current team: Sandnes Ulf (player developer)

Youth career
- Havdur
- –2002: Sola
- 2003–2005: Viking

Senior career*
Years	Team	Apps	(Gls)
2005–2006	Viking	0	(0)
2005	→ Skeid (loan)	11	(0)
2007–2010	Stavanger	82	(15)
2010	Real Maryland Monarchs	19	(0)
2010–2017	Sandnes Ulf	155	(9)
2018–2019	Havdur	30	(8)

Managerial career
- 2018–2020: Havdur (player-coach)
- 2021–: Sandnes Ulf (player developer)
- * Club domestic league appearances and goals as of 11 June 2021

Kenneth Sola (born 25 August 1985) is a Norwegian footballer who plays as a defender for Sandnes Ulf.

== Career ==
Sola hails from Tjelta. He played for IL Havdur, Viking FK and Skeid, before moving to the Norwegian First Division side Stavanger IF in 2006. He played two Norwegian Cup matches for Viking, but did none in the Tippeligaen. He played 82 goals and scored 15 goals for Stavanger IF.

Sola relocated to the United States in 2010 when he signed to play for the Real Maryland Monarchs in the USL Second Division. He made his debut for the team on 17 April 2010 in the team's 2010 season opener against the Pittsburgh Riverhounds.

Joining Sandnes Ulf in mid-2010, he took part in their promotion from the 2011 1. divisjon. After the 2017 season he semi-retired, continuing as player-coach for Havdur on the sixth tier and winning promotion to the 2019 4. divisjon. The league being suspended in 2020 because of the pandemic, in 2021 he became player developer in Sandnes Ulf's youth ranks.

== Career statistics ==
As of 6 November 2017

Season	Club	Division	League		Cup		Total	
Season	Club	Division	Apps	Goals	Apps	Goals	Apps	Goals
2010	Sandnes Ulf	1. divisjon	10	0	0	0	10	0
2011	Sandnes Ulf	1. divisjon	24	2	3	0	27	2
2012	Sandnes Ulf	Tippeligaen	16	0	0	0	16	0
2013	Sandnes Ulf	Tippeligaen	17	5	2	0	19	5
2014	Sandnes Ulf	Tippeligaen	16	0	0	0	16	0
2015	Sandnes Ulf	1. divisjon	27	1	2	0	29	1
2016	Sandnes Ulf	1. divisjon	18	0	2	0	20	0
2017	Sandnes Ulf	1. divisjon	27	1	1	0	28	1
Career Total			155	9	10	0	166	9
