= Emil Johansson (footballer) =

Swedish footballer (born 1986)

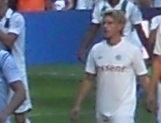

Personal information
- Full name: Emil Johansson
- Date of birth: 11 August 1986 (age 40)
- Place of birth: Karlskoga, Sweden
- Height: 1.72 m (5 ft 8 in)
- Position: Left back

Youth career
- –1999: Karlskoga SK
- 2000–2005: Degerfors IF

Senior career*
Years	Team	Apps	(Gls)
2005–2006	Degerfors IF	48	(4)
2007–2010	Hammarby IF	56	(2)
2010–2011	Molde FK	31	(0)
2011–2014	FC Groningen	8	(0)
2014–2015	Sandnes Ulf	2	(0)
2015–2017	Degerfors IF	38	(0)
Total		183	(6)

International career
2002	Sweden U17	3	(0)
2004–2005	Sweden U19	7	(0)
2007–2009	Sweden U21	15	(0)
2010–2011	Sweden	2	(0)
- * Club domestic league appearances and goals

Emil Johansson (born 11 August 1986) is a Swedish former professional footballer who played as a defender. During his club career he represented Karlskoga SK, Degerfors IF, Hammarby IF, Molde FK, FC Groningen and Sandnes Ulf. A full international between 2010 and 2011, he won two caps for the Sweden national team.

He participated in the 2009 UEFA European Under-21 Football Championship, where he played in all of Sweden's matches and was selected for Goal.com's Team of the Tournament.
