= Ivar Sollie Rønning =

Norwegian footballer (born 1993)

Personal information
- Full name: Ivar Sollie Rønning
- Date of birth: 14 February 1993 (age 33)
- Place of birth: Levanger, Norway
- Height: 1.92 m (6 ft 3 1/2 in)
- Position: Striker

Team information
- Current team: Stjørdals-Blink
- Number: 8

Senior career*
Years	Team	Apps	(Gls)
2012–2015	Levanger	78	(37)
2016–2018	HamKam	77	(45)
2019–2021	Ranheim	30	(9)
2021–2022	KÍ Klaksvík	14	(1)
2022–	Stjørdals-Blink	24	(4)
- * Club domestic league appearances and goals as of 3 November 2022

Ivar Sollie Rønning (born 14 February 1993) is a Norwegian footballer who plays as a striker for Stjørdals-Blink.

== Career ==
He signed a contract with Ranheim in 2019. He previously played for Levanger and HamKam. In January 2021, Rønning signed with KÍ Klaksvík of the Faroe Islands Premier League.

Rønning signed with OBOS-ligaen club Stjørdals-Blink on 27 January 2022, marking his return to Norwegian football.

== Career statistics ==
As of match played 29 October 2022

Appearances and goals by club, season and competition
Club	Season	League			National Cup		Continental		Total	
Club	Season	Division	Apps	Goals	Apps	Goals	Apps	Goals	Apps	Goals
Levanger	2012	2. divisjon	23	13	0	0	-		23	13
Levanger	2013	2. divisjon	25	13	3	0	-		28	13
Levanger	2014	2. divisjon	26	11	0	0	-		26	11
Levanger	2015	1. divisjon	4	0	2	2	-		6	2
Levanger	Total		78	37	5	2	-	-	83	39
HamKam	2016	2. divisjon	25	17	1	0	-		26	17
HamKam	2017	2. divisjon	24	18	1	0	-		25	18
HamKam	2018	OBOS-ligaen	28	10	1	0	-		30	10
HamKam	Total		77	45	3	0	-	-	80	45
Ranheim	2019	Eliteserien	13	2	5	2	-		18	4
Ranheim	2020	OBOS-ligaen	17	7	0	0	-		17	7
Ranheim	Total		30	9	5	2	-	-	35	11
KÍ Klaksvík	2021	Betri deildin	14	1	1	0	2	0	17	1
Stjørdals-Blink	2022	OBOS-ligaen	24	4	1	2	-		25	6
Career total			223	96	15	6	2	0	240	102
