= Sebastian Andreassen =

Norwegian footballer

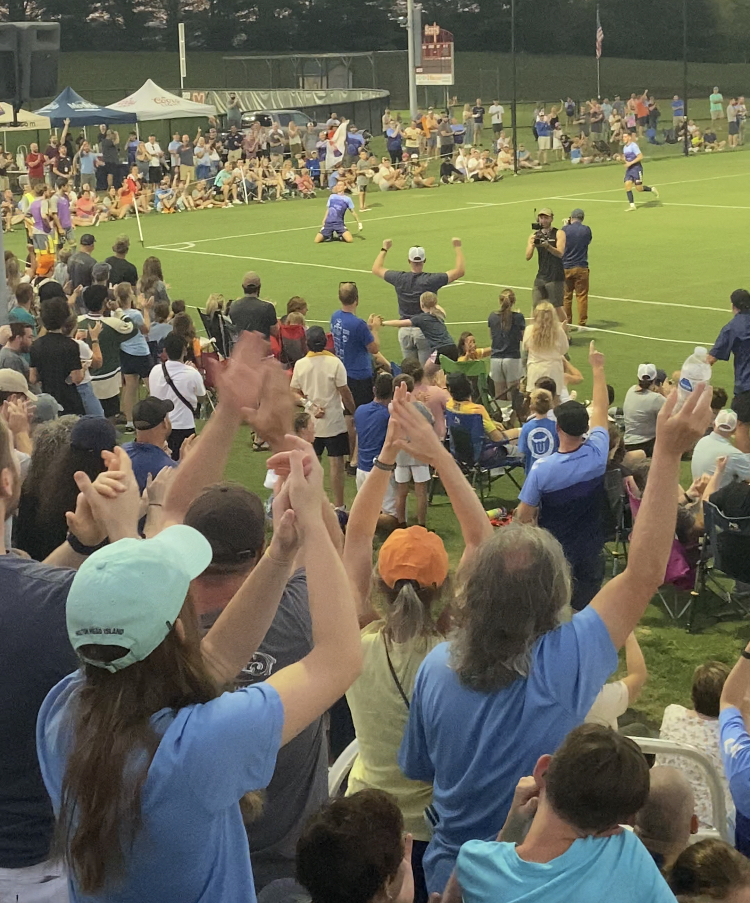
- Andreassen celebrating scoring for One Knoxville at Maryville College in 2022

Personal information
- Full name: Sebastian Longva Andreassen
- Date of birth: 29 May 1997 (age 29)
- Place of birth: Ålesund, Norway
- Height: 6 ft 5 in (1.96 m)
- Position: Forward

Team information
- Current team: Sandviken

Youth career
- 2012–2017: Aalesund

College career
Years	Team	Apps	(Gls)
2017–2019	Young Harris Mountain Lions	55	(21)
2022	Central Arkansas Bears	16	(8)

Senior career*
Years	Team	Apps	(Gls)
2018	Palm Beach United	9	(2)
2019	Cincinnati Dutch Lions	6	(0)
2021	Des Moines Menace	8	(5)
2022	One Knoxville	9	(7)
2023	One Knoxville	13	(1)
2023–	Sandviken	16	(5)
- * Club domestic league appearances and goals as of 16:01, 25 January 2025 (UTC)

Sebastian Longva Andreassen (born 29 May 1997) is a Norwegian footballer who plays as a forward for Sandviken.

== Career ==
=== Early career and college ===
Andreassen played as part of the Aalesund academy, where he scored 96 goals in 115 games at youth level and was named the academy's best player in 2015. In 2017, Andreassen moved to the United States to play college soccer at Young Harris College. In three seasons with the Mountain Lions, Andreassen made 55 appearances, scoring 21 goals and tallying 17 assists. In 2018, he was named to the D2CCA NCAA Division II All-Southeast Region second team and All-Peach Belt Conference first team in both 2018 and 2019. Andreassen played his final season of college soccer at the University of Central Arkansas in 2022, scoring eight goals in 16 appearances for the Bears and was named to the United Soccer Coaches All-Region Teams.

In 2018, Andreassen played in the National Premier Soccer League with Palm Beach United, scoring two goals in nine games. He also played in the USL League Two with three different clubs, beginning in 2019 with Cincinnati Dutch Lions, where he made six appearances. In 2021, he played with Des Moines Menace, scoring five goals on the way to helping the side to the championship title. In 2022, he joined One Knoxville for their inaugural season and helped the team by scoring seven goals in nine appearances.

=== Professional ===
On 25 January 2023, it was announced that Andreassen would re-join One Knoxville for their debut season in the USL League One for 2023.

== Honors ==
=== Club ===
Des Moines Menace

- USL League Two: 2021
