= Tor Erik Torske =

Norwegian footballer (born 1983)

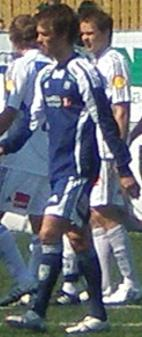
- Torske in 2008.

Personal information
- Full name: Tor Erik Torske
- Date of birth: 14 July 1983 (age 43)
- Place of birth: Molde, Norway
- Height: 1.80 m (5 ft 11 in)
- Position: Forward

Team information
- Current team: Sunndal
- Number: 10

Senior career*
Years	Team	Apps	(Gls)
2003–2006	Sunndal		
2006–2011	Kristiansund	133	(63)
2012	Sunndal	25	(32)
2013–2017	Kristiansund	117	(14)
2018–	Sunndal		
- * Club domestic league appearances and goals as of 31 July 2017

Tor Erik Torske (born 14 July 1983) is a Norwegian football player currently playing as a striker for Sunndal.

After one Eliteserien season with Kristiansund his contract was not renewed and he returned to his former club Sunndal.

== Career statistics ==
As of 31 July 2017

Club	Season	Division	League		Cup		Total	
Club	Season	Division	Apps	Goals	Apps	Goals	Apps	Goals
2012	Sunndal	3. divisjon	25	32	3	4	28	36
2013	Kristiansund	1. divisjon	28	5	1	0	29	5
2014	Kristiansund	1. divisjon	29	7	3	1	32	8
2015	Kristiansund	1. divisjon	30	2	3	1	33	3
2016	Kristiansund	1. divisjon	26	0	1	0	27	0
2017	Kristiansund	Eliteserien	4	0	3	0	7	0
Career Total			142	46	14	6	156	52
