= Edier Frejd =

Swedish footballer

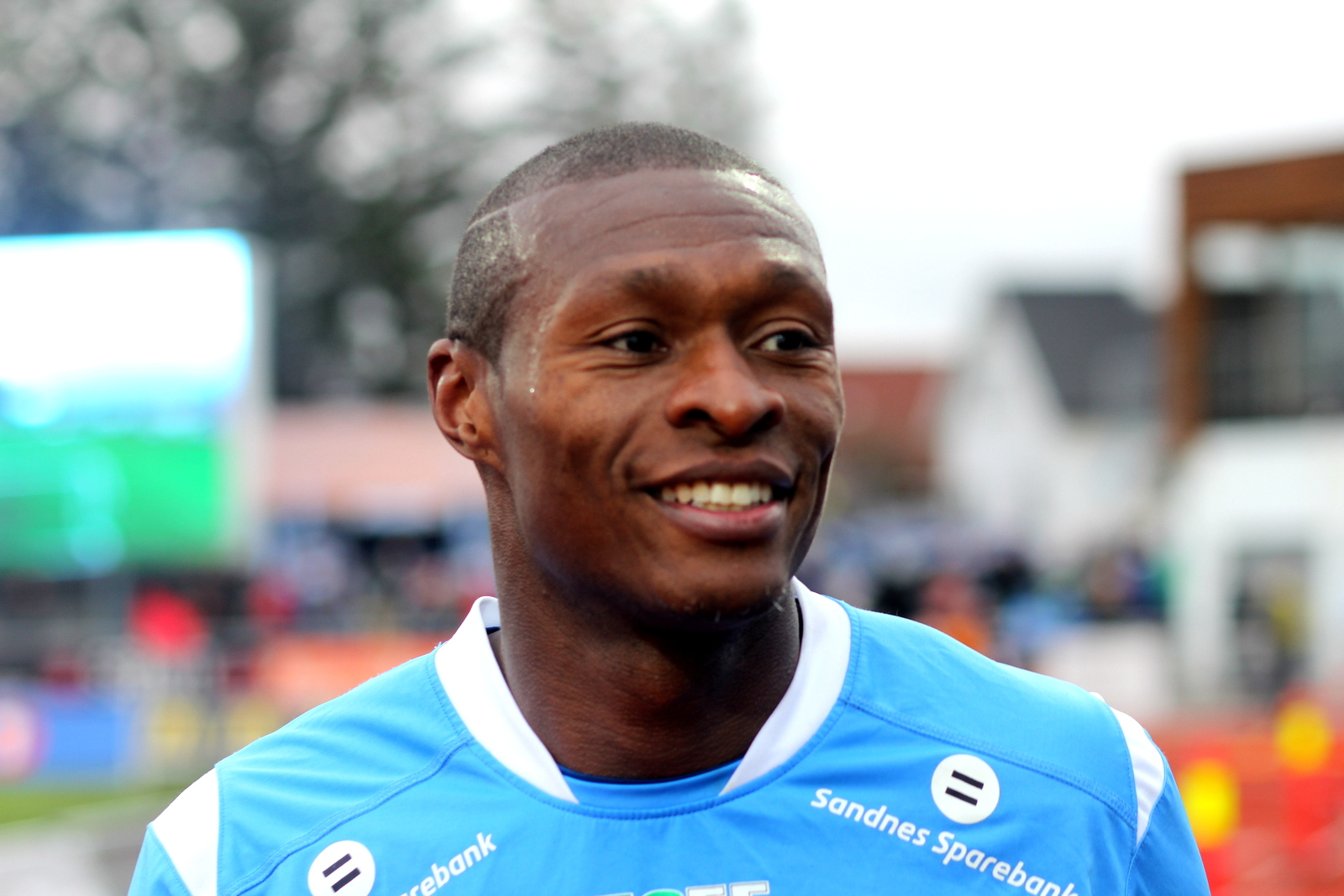

Personal information
- Full name: Edier Frejd
- Date of birth: 16 December 1979 (age 46)
- Place of birth: Cali, Colombia
- Height: 1.84 m (6 ft 0 in)
- Position: Centre back

Senior career*
| Years | Team | Apps | (Gls) |
| 2001–2002 | Elfsborg | 2 | (0) |
| 2002–2003 | UD Las Palmas | 5 | (0) |
| 2004–2006 | GAIS | 41 | (1) |
| 2007–2008 | Raufoss | 25 | (4) |
| 2009–2010 | Kongsvinger | 51 | (5) |
| 2011–2014 | Sandnes Ulf | 104 | (2) |
| 2015 | Eskilstuna City | | |
- * Club domestic league appearances and goals as of 06:45, 3 November 2014 (UTC)

Edier Frejd (born 16 December 1979) is a Colombian-born Swedish footballer.

Before moving to Norway, Frejd previously played for IF Elfsborg and GAIS in the Allsvenskan and UD Las Palmas in the Segunda División. After the 2014 season Frejd left Sandnes Ulf and joined domestic Eskilstuna City FK on a one-year contract.

== Career statistics ==
As of 3 November 2014

| Season | Club | Division | League | | Cup | | Total | |
| Season | Club | Division | Apps | Goals | Apps | Goals | Apps | Goals |
|---|---|---|---|---|---|---|---|---|
| 2009 | Kongsvinger | Adeccoligaen | 23 | 4 | 1 | 0 | 24 | 4 |
| 2010 | Kongsvinger | Tippeligaen | 28 | 1 | 3 | 0 | 31 | 1 |
| 2011 | Sandnes Ulf | Adeccoligaen | 29 | 0 | 1 | 0 | 30 | 0 |
| 2012 | Sandnes Ulf | Tippeligaen | 26 | 0 | 0 | 0 | 26 | 0 |
| 2013 | Sandnes Ulf | Tippeligaen | 27 | 1 | 1 | 0 | 28 | 1 |
| 2014 | Sandnes Ulf | Tippeligaen | 22 | 1 | 0 | 0 | 22 | 1 |
| Career Total | | | 154 | 7 | 6 | 0 | 160 | 7 |
