= Asle Andersen =

Norwegian footballer and manager (born 1972)

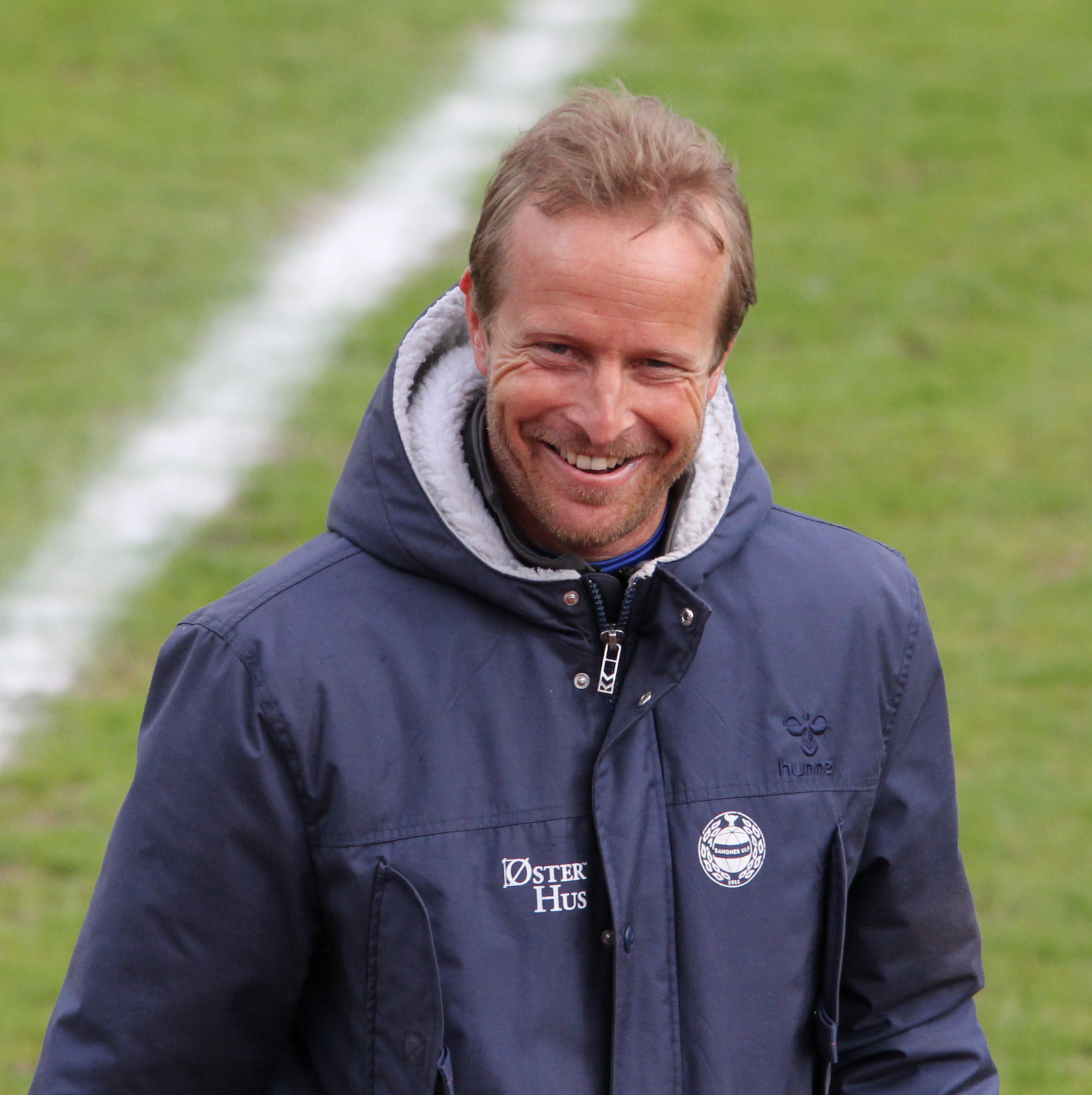

Personal information
- Full name: Asle Andersen
- Date of birth: 15 February 1972 (age 54)
- Place of birth: Stavanger, Norway
- Height: 1.83 m (6 ft 0 in)
- Position: Midfielder

Senior career*
Years	Team	Apps	(Gls)
1991–1993	Viking	21	(4)
1993–2000	Bryne	244	(46)
2000–2003	Haugesund	80	(12)
2003–2005	Bryne	59	(10)
2005–2008	Sandnes Ulf	59	(7)
Total		463	(79)

Managerial career
- –2006: Bryne (assistant)
- 2006–2014: Sandnes Ulf
- * Club domestic league appearances and goals

Asle Andersen (born 15 February 1972) is a Norwegian football manager and former player. He was the manager of Sandnes Ulf from 2006 to July 2014. He was assistant manager of Bryne FK throughout 2005, but resigned in February 2006 after the club had brought on Magnus Johansson as manager.
