= List of Norwegian football transfers winter 2022–23 =

This is a list of Norwegian football transfers in the 2022–2023 winter transfer window by club. Only clubs of the 2023 Eliteserien and 2023 1. divisjon are included.

== Eliteserien ==
=== Aalesund ===
In: Note: Flags indicate national team as defined under FIFA eligibility rules; some limited exceptions apply. Players may hold more than one non-FIFA nationality.

No.	Pos.	Nation	Player
2	DF	NOR	Trace Akino Murray (from Kongsvinger)
7	FW	DEN	Kasper Lunding (from (Netherlands) Heracles)
14	DF	NOR	Ole Martin Kolskogen (from Brann)
19	MF	GHA	Isaac Atanga (from (United States) Cincinnati)
21	MF	SEN	Amidou Diop (from Kristiansund)
22	MF	NOR	Markus Karlsbakk (loan return from Raufoss)
23	DF	NOR	Alexander Stølås (on loan from Sandnes Ulf)
26	GK	NOR	Tor Erik Valderhaug Larsen (loan return from Stjørdals-Blink)
27	FW	SEN	Moctar Diop (from (Senegal) Espoirs de Guediewaye)
31	DF	DEN	Alexander Munksgaard (on loan from (Denmark) AGF)
32	MF	NOR	Kristoffer Strand Ødven (loan return from Hødd)
33	DF	NOR	Simen Vatne Haram (promoted from junior squad)
34	DF	NOR	Stian Aarønes Holte (loan return from Brattvåg)

Out: Note: Flags indicate national team as defined under FIFA eligibility rules; some limited exceptions apply. Players may hold more than one non-FIFA nationality.

No.	Pos.	Nation	Player
2	DF	SRB	Petar Golubović (to (Russia) Khimki)
7	MF	CPV	Erikson Lima (released)
8	MF	NOR	Fredrik Haugen (to Stabæk)
11	MF	NOR	Simen Bolkan Nordli (to (Denmark) Randers)
14	FW	NOR	Torbjørn Kallevåg (to Hødd)
20	DF	NOR	Oscar Solnørdal (on loan to Kongsvinger)
23	FW	GHA	Gilbert Koomson (loan return to Bodø/Glimt)
25	DF	BIH	Besim Šerbečić (to (Bosnia and Herzegovina) Sarajevo)
27	MF	CRO	Dario Čanađija (to (Croatia) Šibenik)
33	DF	NOR	Simen Rafn (to Fredrikstad)

=== Bodø/Glimt ===
In: Note: Flags indicate national team as defined under FIFA eligibility rules; some limited exceptions apply. Players may hold more than one non-FIFA nationality.

No.	Pos.	Nation	Player
3	DF	NOR	Omar Elabdellaoui (free transfer)
4	DF	NOR	Odin Bjørtuft (from Odd)
9	FW	NOR	Lasse Selvåg Nordås (loan return from Tromsø)
12	GK	RUS	Nikita Haikin (from (England) Bristol City)
15	DF	NOR	Fredrik André Bjørkan (from (Germany) Hertha BSC)
23	FW	DEN	Jeppe Kjær (from (Netherlands) Jong Ajax)
29	FW	CMR	Faris Pemi Moumbagna (from Kristiansund)
30	DF	DEN	Adam Sørensen (from (Denmark) Lyngby)
33	MF	NOR	Mats Pedersen (promoted from junior squad)
37	MF	NOR	Ask Tjærandsen-Skau (loan return from Jerv)
44	GK	NOR	Magnus Brøndbo (promoted from junior squad)
45	GK	NOR	Isak Sjong (promoted from junior squad)
93	FW	NOR	Joel Mvuka (on loan from (France) Lorient)
—	MF	NOR	Syver Skundberg Skeide (from Hødd)
—	FW	NOR	Petter Nosakhare Dahl (from KFUM)

Out: Note: Flags indicate national team as defined under FIFA eligibility rules; some limited exceptions apply. Players may hold more than one non-FIFA nationality.

No.	Pos.	Nation	Player
2	DF	DEN	Japhet Sery Larsen (to Brann)
3	DF	ISL	Alfons Sampsted (to (Netherlands) Twente)
4	DF	NOR	Marius Høibråten (to (Japan) Urawa Red Diamonds)
9	FW	NOR	Ola Solbakken (to (Italy) Roma)
12	GK	RUS	Nikita Khaykin (to (England) Bristol City)
15	MF	NOR	Anders Konradsen (retired)
23	MF	NOR	Elias Kristoffersen Hagen (to (Sweden) IFK Göteborg)
25	GK	NOR	Marcus Ellingsen Andersen (to Hødd)
26	DF	NOR	Sigurd Kvile (on loan to Sarpsborg 08)
32	FW	NOR	Joel Mvuka (to (France) Lorient)
35	MF	NOR	Adan Abadala Hussein (to Moss)
77	FW	GHA	Gilbert Koomson (to Sandefjord, previously on loan at Aalesund)
88	FW	NOR	Lars-Jørgen Salvesen (to Viking)
–	MF	NOR	Syver Skundberg Skeide (on loan to Hødd)
—	FW	NOR	Petter Nosakhare Dahl (on loan to KFUM)

=== Brann ===
In: Note: Flags indicate national team as defined under FIFA eligibility rules; some limited exceptions apply. Players may hold more than one non-FIFA nationality.

No.	Pos.	Nation	Player
6	DF	DEN	Japhet Sery Larsen (from Bodø/Glimt)
14	MF	NOR	Ulrik Mathisen (from Lillestrøm)
23	DF	NOR	Thore Pedersen (from Haugesund)

Out: Note: Flags indicate national team as defined under FIFA eligibility rules; some limited exceptions apply. Players may hold more than one non-FIFA nationality.

No.	Pos.	Nation	Player
5	DF	DEN	Andreas Skovgaard (to Stabæk)
6	MF	NOR	Vegard Leikvoll Moberg (to Kongsvinger)
15	MF	NOR	Kasper Skaanes (to Sogndal)
24	GK	NOR	Markus Olsen Pettersen (to (Faroe Islands) KÍ Klaksvík)
27	DF	NOR	Runar Hove (retired)
–	DF	NOR	Ole Martin Kolskogen (to Aalesund, previously on loan at Jerv)
–	FW	SWE	Moonga Simba (on loan to (Sweden) GIF Sundsvall, previously on loan at (Sweden) Värnamo)
–	FW	NOR	Filip Møller Delaveris (on loan to (Sweden) J-Södra, previously on loan at KFUM)

=== HamKam ===
In: Note: Flags indicate national team as defined under FIFA eligibility rules; some limited exceptions apply. Players may hold more than one non-FIFA nationality.

No.	Pos.	Nation	Player
3	DF	DEN	Jens Martin Gammelby (from (Denmark) Brøndby)
4	DF	NOR	John Olav Norheim (from Jerv)
8	MF	DEN	Oliver Kjærgaard (from (Denmark) Helsingør)
11	MF	NOR	Tore André Sørås (from KFUM)
12	GK	SWE	Marcus Sandberg (from Stabæk)
14	FW	NOR	Henrik Udahl (from Vålerenga)
17	FW	SWE	Rasmus Wiedesheim-Paul (on loan from Rosenborg)
19	MF	SWE	William Kurtovic (from Sandefjord)
24	MF	NOR	Arne Hopland Ødegård (promoted from junior squad)
25	MF	NOR	Jonas Dobloug Rasen (promoted from junior squad)
26	DF	ISL	Brynjar Ingi Bjarnason (from Vålerenga)
28	GK	NOR	Petter Eichler Jensen (promoted from junior squad, previously on loan at Lillehammer)
30	MF	CIV	Archange Mondouo (from (Ivory Coast) Tito FC Gbolouville)

Out: Note: Flags indicate national team as defined under FIFA eligibility rules; some limited exceptions apply. Players may hold more than one non-FIFA nationality.

No.	Pos.	Nation	Player
3	DF	CRC	Fernán Faerrón (loan return to (Costa Rica) Desamparados)
6	DF	NOR	Markus Nakkim (to (United States) Orange County)
8	DF	NOR	Vetle Skjærvik (to Lillestrøm)
10	MF	NOR	Emil Sildnes (to Åsane)
11	MF	NOR	Morten Bjørlo (to Rosenborg)
12	MF	CAN	Clément Bayiha (to (Canada) York United)
15	MF	NOR	Thorbjørn Kristiansen (demoted to junior squad)
17	FW	DEN	Victor Lind (loan return to (Denmark) Midtjylland)
19	FW	NOR	Marcus Pedersen (to Løten)
58	DF	TUR	Hasan Kurucay (to (Germany) Eintracht Braunschweig)
73	MF	LAT	Eduards Dašķevičs (to (Latvia) Riga)
77	FW	UKR	Yuriy Yakovenko (released)
91	MF	NGR	Rilwan Hassan (to (Indonesia) Sreenidi Deccan)

=== Haugesund ===
In: Note: Flags indicate national team as defined under FIFA eligibility rules; some limited exceptions apply. Players may hold more than one non-FIFA nationality.

No.	Pos.	Nation	Player
2	DF	NOR	Claus Niyukuri (from Vard)
3	DF	SWE	Oscar Krusnell (from (Sweden) Brommapojkarna)
10	MF	ALB	Adrion Pajaziti (on loan from (England) Fulham Academy)
12	GK	NOR	Amund Wichne (from Jerv)
17	FW	NGR	Oluwasegun Otusanya (on loan from (Nigeria) Stars Builders Academy)
24	MF	NOR	Troy Engseth Nyhammer (promoted from junior squad)
25	DF	NOR	Mikkel Hope (promoted from junior squad)
29	FW	MLI	Sory Ibrahim Diarra (from (Romania) Petrolul)
30	FW	ISL	Kjartan Kári Halldórsson (from (Iceland) Grótta)
42	GK	NOR	Sander Kaldråstøyl Østraat (promoted from junior squad)

Out: Note: Flags indicate national team as defined under FIFA eligibility rules; some limited exceptions apply. Players may hold more than one non-FIFA nationality.

No.	Pos.	Nation	Player
3	DF	NOR	Nikolas Walstad (on loan to Stabæk)
10	MF	NOR	Christos Zafeiris (to (Czech Republic) Slavia Prague)
17	FW	NGR	Hilary Gong (to Ararat-Armenia)
20	MF	NOR	Torje Naustdal (to Skeid, previously on loan at Grorud)
23	DF	NOR	Thore Pedersen (to Brann)
30	MF	SEN	Ibrahima Cissokho (loan return to (Senegal) US Gorée)
30	FW	ISL	Kjartan Kári Halldórsson (on loan to (Iceland) FH)
32	GK	NOR	Frank Stople (on loan to Vard)
36	DF	NOR	Eivind Helgeland (on loan to Vard)
39	MF	NOR	Mathias Tjoland (demoted to junior squad, previously on loan at Åkra)
–	FW	NOR	Joacim Holtan (on loan to Kongsvinger, previously on loan at Start)
–	FW	NOR	Andreas Endresen (to Vard, previously on loan)

=== Lillestrøm ===
In: Note: Flags indicate national team as defined under FIFA eligibility rules; some limited exceptions apply. Players may hold more than one non-FIFA nationality.

No.	Pos.	Nation	Player
3	DF	NOR	Martin Ove Roseth (from Sogndal)
6	MF	NOR	Vebjørn Hoff (from Rosenborg)
16	MF	NGR	Uba Charles Nwokoma (from (Sweden) Ljungskile)
19	DF	NOR	Kristoffer Tønnessen (from Start)
20	DF	NOR	Vetle Skjærvik (from Hamkam)
21	DF	NOR	Andreas Vindheim (on loan from (Czech Republic) Sparta Prague)
22	DF	NOR	Philip Slørdahl (loan return from Sogndal)
24	FW	NOR	Tobias Svendsen (return from hiatus)
28	DF	NOR	Ruben Gabrielsen (from (United States) Austin)
–	DF	NOR	Marcus Paulsen (promoted from junior squad)

Out: Note: Flags indicate national team as defined under FIFA eligibility rules; some limited exceptions apply. Players may hold more than one non-FIFA nationality.

No.	Pos.	Nation	Player
3	DF	NOR	Colin Rösler (to (Sweden) Mjällby)
6	MF	FIN	Kaan Kairinen (to (Czech Republic) Sparta Prague)
7	FW	NOR	Pål André Helland (retired)
18	MF	NOR	Ulrik Mathisen (to Brann, previously on loan at Sogndal)
21	FW	ISL	Hólmbert Friðjónsson (loan return to (Germany) Holstein Kiel)
24	DF	SWE	Tom Pettersson (to (Sweden) Mjällby)
26	MF	NOR	Dylan Murugesapillai (on loan to Træff)
27	DF	CIV	Ibrahim Cissé (loan return to (Ivory Coast) Zoman)
29	GK	NOR	Jørgen Sveinhaug (on loan to Grorud)
30	DF	NGR	Igoh Ogbu (to (Czech Republic) Slavia Prague)
31	MF	NOR	Martin Bergum (on loan to Strømmen, previously on loan at Ull/Kisa)
33	FW	NOR	Henrik Skogvold (on loan to Start)
58	FW	DEN	Aral Şimşir (loan return to (Denmark) Midtjylland)
77	MF	DEN	Frederik Holst (to (Sweden) Helsingborg)
–	FW	NOR	Uranik Seferi (on loan to Strømmen, previously on loan at Kvik Halden)
–	DF	NOR	Marcus Paulsen (on loan to Strømmen)

=== Molde ===
In: Note: Flags indicate national team as defined under FIFA eligibility rules; some limited exceptions apply. Players may hold more than one non-FIFA nationality.

No.	Pos.	Nation	Player
9	FW	NOR	Veton Berisha (from (Sweden) Hammarby)
10	MF	NOR	Eric Kitolano (from Tromsø)
25	MF	DEN	Anders Hagelskjær (from (Denmark) AaB)
32	MF	SWE	Harun Ibrahim (from (Sweden) GAIS)
34	GK	NOR	Peder Hoel Lervik (promoted from junior squad)

Out: Note: Flags indicate national team as defined under FIFA eligibility rules; some limited exceptions apply. Players may hold more than one non-FIFA nationality.

No.	Pos.	Nation	Player
9	FW	CIV	Datro Fofana (to (England) Chelsea)
10	FW	ISL	Björn Bergmann Sigurðarson (released)
12	GK	BEL	Álex Craninx (to (Spain) Fuenlabrada)
16	MF	NOR	Etzaz Hussain (to (Cyprus) Apollon Limassol)
18	DF	NOR	Kristoffer Haraldseid (retired)
30	FW	CIV	Mathis Bolly (released)
32	FW	NOR	Niklas Edris Haugland (to Gneist, previously on loan at Åsane)

=== Odd ===
In: Note: Flags indicate national team as defined under FIFA eligibility rules; some limited exceptions apply. Players may hold more than one non-FIFA nationality.

No.	Pos.	Nation	Player
4	DF	SWE	Leon Hien (from (Sweden) Hammarby Talang)
5	DF	FIN	Diogo Tomas (from (Finland) KuPS)
6	MF	GHA	Leonard Owusu (from (Canada) Vancouver Whitecaps)
11	FW	NOR	Ole Erik Midtskogen (from Kjelsås)
13	DF	NOR	Samuel Skree Skjeldal (promoted from junior squad)
15	DF	NOR	Sondre Solholm Johansen (from (Scotland) Motherwell)
16	DF	NOR	Casper Glenna Andersen (promoted from junior squad)
23	FW	NOR	Anders Hartveit Ryste (promoted from junior squad)
29	FW	NOR	Bork Bang-Kittilsen (promoted from junior squad)

Out: Note: Flags indicate national team as defined under FIFA eligibility rules; some limited exceptions apply. Players may hold more than one non-FIFA nationality.

No.	Pos.	Nation	Player
1	GK	NOR	Sondre Rossbach (on loan to (Sweden) Degerfors, previously on loan at Vålerenga)
4	DF	NOR	Odin Bjørtuft (to Bodø/Glimt)
5	DF	SVK	Ivan Mesík (loan return to (Denmark) Nordsjælland)
6	MF	NOR	Magnus Lekven (retired)
9	FW	KOS	Flamur Kastrati (retired)
10	FW	NOR	Adama Diomande (to (Canada) Toronto)
11	FW	FRO	Gilli Rólantsson (to (Faroe Islands) TB Tvøroyri)
13	DF	NOR	Kevin Egell-Johnsen (to Arendal)
16	MF	NOR	Vebjørn Hoff (loan return to Rosenborg)
22	FW	NOR	Abel William Stensrud (on loan to Bryne)
25	FW	AUT	Philipp Zulechner (released)

=== Rosenborg ===
In: Note: Flags indicate national team as defined under FIFA eligibility rules; some limited exceptions apply. Players may hold more than one non-FIFA nationality.

No.	Pos.	Nation	Player
6	MF	FIN	Santeri Väänänen (from (Finland) HJK)
11	FW	CAN	Jayden Nelson (from (Canada) Toronto)
17	FW	ISL	Ísak Þorvaldsson (from (Iceland) Breiðablik)
18	MF	NOR	Morten Bjørlo (from HamKam)
22	FW	FIN	Agon Sadiku (from (Finland) Honka)
23	DF	NOR	Ulrik Yttergård Jenssen (from (Denmark) Nordsjælland)
29	FW	NOR	Oscar Aga (from (Sweden) Elfsborg)

Out: Note: Flags indicate national team as defined under FIFA eligibility rules; some limited exceptions apply. Players may hold more than one non-FIFA nationality.

No.	Pos.	Nation	Player
4	MF	NOR	Vebjørn Hoff (to Lillestrøm, previously on loan at Odd)
11	MF	DEN	Victor Jensen (loan return to (Netherlands) Ajax)
14	FW	SWE	Rasmus Wiedesheim-Paul (on loan to HamKam, previously on loan at (Sweden) Helsingborg)
17	FW	DEN	Casper Tengstedt (to (Portugal) Benfica)
18	DF	ARG	Renzo Giampaoli (loan return to (Argentina) Boca Juniors)
22	FW	SWE	Stefano Vecchia (to (Sweden) Malmö)
38	FW	NOR	Mikkel Ceïde (on loan to Kristiansund, previously on loan to Tromsø)
39	MF	NOR	Marius Sivertsen Broholm (on loan to Kristiansund)
40	FW	NOR	Pawel Chrupalla (on loan to (Poland) Wisła Płock, previously on loan at Kristiansund)

=== Sandefjord ===
In: Note: Flags indicate national team as defined under FIFA eligibility rules; some limited exceptions apply. Players may hold more than one non-FIFA nationality.

No.	Pos.	Nation	Player
7	FW	GHA	Gilbert Koomson (from Bodø/Glimt)
12	GK	NOR	Mats Gulbrandsen Viken (from KFUM)
14	MF	SWE	Danilo Andres Al-Saed (from (Sweden) Sandviken)
18	MF	SWE	Filip Ottosson (from (Sweden) Landskrona)
21	MF	SYR	Simon Amin (from (Sweden) Trelleborg)
24	DF	NOR	Fredrik Berglie (from Skeid)
27	MF	NOR	Jakob Maslø Dunsby (from Egersund)
30	GK	NOR	Alf Lukas Noel Grønneberg (from Eik Tønsberg)
54	GK	NOR	Andreas Albertsen (loan return from Halsen)

Out: Note: Flags indicate national team as defined under FIFA eligibility rules; some limited exceptions apply. Players may hold more than one non-FIFA nationality.

No.	Pos.	Nation	Player
1	GK	NOR	Jacob Storevik (to Vålerenga)
2	DF	NOR	Mats Haakenstad (to Kongsvinger)
3	DF	NED	Quint Jansen (to Mjøndalen)
7	MF	NOR	Mohamed Ofkir (to Vålerenga)
8	MF	SWE	William Kurtovic (to Hamkam)
9	FW	NOR	Sivert Gussiås (to (Faroe Islands) KÍ Klaksvík)
10	FW	CRC	Deyver Vega (released)
16	MF	NOR	André Sødlund (retired)
19	MF	BIH	Amer Ordagić (released)
21	DF	NOR	Fredrik Flo (to Skeid)
22	DF	NOR	Jørgen Kili Fjeldskår (on loan to Fram)
24	MF	NOR	Harmeet Singh (released)
27	MF	SWE	Albin Winbo (loan return to (Sweden) Varberg)
28	FW	ESP	Rufo (to (Spain) Logroñés)

=== Sarpsborg 08 ===
In: Note: Flags indicate national team as defined under FIFA eligibility rules; some limited exceptions apply. Players may hold more than one non-FIFA nationality.

No.	Pos.	Nation	Player
3	DF	NOR	Sigurd Kvile (on loan from Bodø/Glimt)
7	FW	NOR	Martin Hoel Andersen (from Kongsvinger)
8	MF	DEN	Jeppe Andersen (from (Sweden) Hammarby)
10	MF	SWE	Ramon Pascal Lundqvist (from (Netherlands) Groningen)
12	GK	NOR	Jarik Sundling (promoted from junior squad)
14	FW	MLI	Amadou Camara (loan return from (Senegal) Oslo FA)
20	DF	NOR	Peter Reinhardsen (from Start)
77	DF	NOR	Markus Olsvik Welinder (promoted from junior squad, previously on loan at Moss)
90	FW	GHA	Christopher Bonsu Baah (from (Ghana) Accra Shooting Stars)

Out: Note: Flags indicate national team as defined under FIFA eligibility rules; some limited exceptions apply. Players may hold more than one non-FIFA nationality.

No.	Pos.	Nation	Player
1	GK	NOR	Simen Vidtun Nilsen (on loan to Skeid)
3	DF	NOR	Jørgen Horn (to Gamle Oslo)
7	MF	NOR	Ole Jørgen Halvorsen (to Borgen)
8	FW	SWE	Guillermo Molins (released)
10	MF	MLI	Aboubacar Konté (to Fredrikstad)
13	MF	DEN	Anders Hagelskjær (loan return to (Denmark) AaB)
19	MF	SEN	Laurent Mendy (to Moss, previously on loan at (Senegal) Oslo FA)
20	MF	SWE	Anton Salétros (to (France) Caen)
30	FW	SWE	Gustav Engvall (loan return to (Belgium) Mechelen)
41	MF	NOR	Tobias Heintz (loan return to (Sweden) Häcken)

=== Stabæk ===
In: Note: Flags indicate national team as defined under FIFA eligibility rules; some limited exceptions apply. Players may hold more than one non-FIFA nationality.

No.	Pos.	Nation	Player
6	DF	DEN	Andreas Skovgaard (from Brann)
7	MF	NOR	Fredrik Haugen (from Aalesund)
9	FW	NOR	Mushaga Bakenga (from (Japan) Tokushima Vortis)
11	DF	NOR	Nikolas Walstad (on loan from Haugesund)
12	GK	NOR	Leander Gunnerød (promoted from junior squad)
19	FW	SWE	Kevin Kabran (from Viking)
21	GK	SWE	Isak Pettersson (from (France) Toulouse)
22	FW	NOR	Philip Schie (promoted from junior squad)
33	DF	GER	Tobias Pachonik (free transfer)
36	DF	NOR	Fillip Jenssen Riise (promoted from junior squad)
47	MF	BRA	Jonatan Lucca (free transfer)
69	FW	DEN	Kasper Høgh (on loan from AaB)

Out: Note: Flags indicate national team as defined under FIFA eligibility rules; some limited exceptions apply. Players may hold more than one non-FIFA nationality.

No.	Pos.	Nation	Player
7	FW	NOR	Fitim Azemi (released)
9	FW	SWE	Adam Kaied (loan return to (Sweden) Helsingborg)
9	FW	NGR	Gift Orban (to (Belgium) Gent)
11	FW	NOR	Kornelius Normann Hansen (to (Netherlands) Almere City)
12	GK	SWE	Marcus Sandberg (to Hamkam)
18	MF	CAN	Patrick Metcalfe (to Fredrikstad)
19	DF	SWE	Victor Wernersson (loan return to (Belgium) Mechelen)
21	DF	NOR	Thomas Vold (released)
22	DF	NOR	Peder Vogt (to Bærum)
27	MF	CIV	Diabagate Mohamed Junior (loan return to (Ivory Coast) Issia Wazy)
–	DF	NOR	Kristoffer Lassen Harrison (to KFUM, previously on loan at Grorud)

=== Strømsgodset ===
In: Note: Flags indicate national team as defined under FIFA eligibility rules; some limited exceptions apply. Players may hold more than one non-FIFA nationality.

No.	Pos.	Nation	Player
11	MF	NOR	Jostein Ekeland (from Sandnes Ulf)
15	MF	NOR	Andreas Heredia-Randen (from Asker)
21	MF	NOR	Marko Farji (promoted from junior squad)
22	MF	NOR	Jonas Therkelsen (promoted from junior squad)
27	DF	NOR	Fredrik Kristensen Dahl (from KFUM)
28	DF	NOR	Eirik Espelid Blikstad (promoted from junior squad)
77	FW	NOR	Marcus Mehnert (from Ranheim)

Out: Note: Flags indicate national team as defined under FIFA eligibility rules; some limited exceptions apply. Players may hold more than one non-FIFA nationality.

No.	Pos.	Nation	Player
5	DF	NOR	Niklas Gunnarsson (to (Sweden) Norrköping)
8	MF	NOR	Johan Hove (to (Netherlands) Groningen)
9	FW	NGR	Fred Friday (to (Israel) Beitar Jerusalem)
11	MF	NOR	Kristoffer Tokstad (to Mjøndalen)
23	FW	NOR	Aleksander Biermann Stenseth (released)

=== Tromsø ===
In: Note: Flags indicate national team as defined under FIFA eligibility rules; some limited exceptions apply. Players may hold more than one non-FIFA nationality.

No.	Pos.	Nation	Player
1	GK	DEN	Jakob Haugaard (from (Sweden) AIK, previously on loan)
9	MF	ISL	Hilmir Rafn Mikaelsson (on loan from (Italy) Venezia)
10	MF	NOR	Jakob Napoleon Romsaas (from Skeid)
14	DF	NOR	Tobias Vonheim Norbye (from Alta)
15	FW	NOR	Vegard Erlien (from Ranheim)
16	DF	FIN	Miika Koskela (from (Finland) Oulu)
17	FW	NOR	Yaw Paintsil (from Kjelsås)
26	DF	SEN	El Hadji Malick Diouf (from (Senegal) Academie Mawade Wade)
27	FW	NOR	Jens Hjertø-Dahl (promoted from junior squad)
29	FW	GUI	Maï Traoré (on loan from Viking)

Out: Note: Flags indicate national team as defined under FIFA eligibility rules; some limited exceptions apply. Players may hold more than one non-FIFA nationality.

No.	Pos.	Nation	Player
6	DF	NOR	Mikkel Konradsen Ceïde (loan return to Rosenborg)
9	FW	NOR	Lasse Selvåg Nordås (loan return to Bodø/Glimt)
10	FW	NOR	August Mikkelsen (to (Sweden) Hammarby)
14	DF	NOR	Warren Kamanzi (to (France) Toulouse)
15	FW	FIN	Jasse Tuominen (loan return to (Sweden) Häcken)
17	MF	NOR	Eric Kitolano (to Molde)
18	FW	NOR	Elias Aarflot (on loan to Lyn)
26	DF	NOR	Isak Kjelsrud Vik (on loan to Tromsdalen)
29	FW	NOR	Didrik Hafstad (to Tromsdalen)
32	GK	NOR	Mats Trige (on loan to Skeid, previously on loan at Alta, then to Alta a second time)

=== Viking ===
In: Note: Flags indicate national team as defined under FIFA eligibility rules; some limited exceptions apply. Players may hold more than one non-FIFA nationality.

No.	Pos.	Nation	Player
7	FW	AUS	Nicholas D'Agostino (from (Australia) Melbourne Victory)
9	FW	NOR	Lars-Jørgen Salvesen (from Bodø/Glimt)
14	MF	AUS	Patrick Yazbek (from (Australia) Sydney)
23	DF	SLO	Jošt Urbančič (from (Slovenia) Gorica)
26	FW	NOR	Simen Kvia-Egeskog (loan return from Skeid)
27	MF	ISL	Birkir Bjarnason (from (Turkey) Adana Demirspor)
28	MF	NOR	Lars Erik Sødal (loan return from Sandnes Ulf)

Out: Note: Flags indicate national team as defined under FIFA eligibility rules; some limited exceptions apply. Players may hold more than one non-FIFA nationality.

No.	Pos.	Nation	Player
7	MF	NOR	Fredrik Torsteinbø (to Sandnes Ulf)
9	FW	SWE	Kevin Kabran (to Stabæk)
13	GK	NOR	Magnus Rugland Ree (on loan to Levanger)
19	MF	NOR	Sondre Auklend (on loan to Jerv)
22	FW	NOR	Daniel Karlsbakk (to (Netherlands) Heerenveen)
23	DF	NOR	Rolf Daniel Vikstøl (to Start)
24	FW	GUI	Maï Traoré (on loan to (Belgium) OH Leuven, then on loan to Tromsø)
25	DF	NOR	Sebastian Sørlie Henriksen (to Grorud, previously on loan at Egersund)
28	MF	NOR	Lars Erik Sødal (on loan to Bryne)
33	DF	NOR	Vebjørn Hagen (retired)
34	DF	NOR	Kristoffer Forgaard Paulsen (on loan to (Iceland) KA Akureyri)
41	MF	NOR	Heine Åsen Larsen (to Egersund, previously on loan)

=== Vålerenga ===
In: Note: Flags indicate national team as defined under FIFA eligibility rules; some limited exceptions apply. Players may hold more than one non-FIFA nationality.

No.	Pos.	Nation	Player
1	GK	NOR	Jacob Storevik (from Sandefjord)
10	MF	NOR	Mohamed Ofkir (from Sandefjord)
11	MF	FIN	Daniel Håkans (from Jerv)
14	DF	NOR	Aaron Kiil Olsen (from KFUM)
22	MF	NOR	Stian Sjøvold Thorstensen (promoted from junior squad)
23	DF	NOR	Henrik Heggheim (on loan from (Denmark) Brøndby)
26	FW	NOR	Filip Thorvaldsen (promoted from junior squad)
29	FW	BRA	Vitinho (on loan from (Brazil) Palmeiras)
30	GK	NOR	Magnus Stær-Jensen (from Grorud)
31	MF	NOR	Omar Bully Drammeh (from Grorud)

Out: Note: Flags indicate national team as defined under FIFA eligibility rules; some limited exceptions apply. Players may hold more than one non-FIFA nationality.

No.	Pos.	Nation	Player
1	GK	NOR	Sondre Rossbach (loan return to Odd)
4	DF	NOR	Jonatan Tollås (retired)
10	FW	NOR	Osame Sahraoui (to (Netherlands) Heerenveen)
11	FW	TUN	Amor Layouni (on loan to (Australia) Western Sydney Wanderers)
14	FW	NOR	Henrik Udahl (to HamKam)
16	MF	NOR	Mathias Emilsen (on loan to Sandnes Ulf)
17	FW	NOR	Tobias Christensen (to (Hungary) Fehérvár)
23	DF	ISL	Brynjar Ingi Bjarnason (to Hamkam)

== 1. divisjon ==
=== Bryne ===
In: Note: Flags indicate national team as defined under FIFA eligibility rules; some limited exceptions apply. Players may hold more than one non-FIFA nationality.

No.	Pos.	Nation	Player
1	GK	SWE	Anton Cajtoft (from (Sweden) Norrby)
4	MF	NOR	Christian Landu Landu (from Sandnes Ulf)
6	DF	FRO	Noah Mneney (from (Faroe Islands) Víkingur)
9	MF	NOR	Lars Erik Sødal (on loan from Viking)
11	FW	NOR	Abel William Stensrud (on loan from Odd)
12	GK	NOR	Sem Aleksander Bergene (from Rosseland)
14	MF	NOR	Erik Franke Saunes (from Hødd)
17	MF	NOR	Elias Ivesdal Årsvoll (from Ålgård)
25	DF	SWE	Daniel Hermansson (loan return from (Sweden) J-Södra)
32	FW	NOR	Sjur Jonassen (promoted from junior squad)

Out: Note: Flags indicate national team as defined under FIFA eligibility rules; some limited exceptions apply. Players may hold more than one non-FIFA nationality.

No.	Pos.	Nation	Player
4	DF	NOR	Marius Andersen (to Egersund, previously on loan)
6	MF	NOR	Henning Romslo (retired)
7	MF	NOR	Vegard Aasen (to Sola)
9	FW	NOR	Arne Gunnes (on loan to Ranheim)
11	MF	NOR	Bjarne Langeland (retired)
12	GK	SWE	Elias Hadaya (loan return to Kristiansund)
18	FW	NOR	Jørgen Voilås (to Egersund)
19	DF	NOR	Tobias Guddal (on loan to Levanger, previously on loan at Notodden)
21	FW	NOR	Ingmar Orkelbog Austberg (on loan to Stjørdals-Blink, previously on loan at Kolstad)

=== Fredrikstad ===
In: Note: Flags indicate national team as defined under FIFA eligibility rules; some limited exceptions apply. Players may hold more than one non-FIFA nationality.

No.	Pos.	Nation	Player
2	DF	SWE	Tim Björkström (from (Sweden) Sirius)
5	DF	NOR	Simen Rafn (from Aalesund)
12	MF	CAN	Patrick Metcalfe (from Stabæk)
14	FW	FRO	Jóannes Bjartalíð (from (Faroe Islands) KÍ)
16	MF	MLI	Aboubacar Konté (from Sarpsborg 08)
19	MF	ISL	Júlíus Magnússon (from (Iceland) Víkingur)
27	MF	FRO	Brandur Hendriksson (from (Sweden) Helsingborg)

Out: Note: Flags indicate national team as defined under FIFA eligibility rules; some limited exceptions apply. Players may hold more than one non-FIFA nationality.

No.	Pos.	Nation	Player
2	DF	NOR	Alexander Betten Hansen (released)
10	FW	NOR	Nicolay Solberg (released)
14	MF	SWE	Jakob Lindström (to (Sweden) Ahlafors)
16	FW	NOR	Marcus Wenneberg (to Levanger)
19	MF	NOR	Olav Øby (to (Iceland) KR)
22	FW	NOR	Obilor Okeke (to KFUM)
33	MF	NOR	Filip Stensland (on loan to Kvik Halden)

=== Hødd ===
In: Note: Flags indicate national team as defined under FIFA eligibility rules; some limited exceptions apply. Players may hold more than one non-FIFA nationality.

No.	Pos.	Nation	Player
3	DF	SWE	Rasmus Bonde (on loan from (Sweden) AIK)
11	FW	NOR	Torbjørn Kallevåg (from Aalesund)
14	MF	NOR	Halvard Urnes (from Træff)
17		NOR	Kjetil Holand Tøsse (from Stjørdals-Blink)
18	DF	POR	Bernardo Morgado (on loan from (Sweden) Trollhättan)
19		NOR	Mirza Mulac (promoted from junior squad)
20	MF	NOR	Syver Skundberg Skeide (on loan from Bodø/Glimt)
25	GK	NOR	Marcus Ellingsen Andersen (from Bodø/Glimt)
32	DF	NOR	Sander Munkeby Sundnes (from Levanger)

Out: Note: Flags indicate national team as defined under FIFA eligibility rules; some limited exceptions apply. Players may hold more than one non-FIFA nationality.

No.	Pos.	Nation	Player
3	DF	NOR	Magnus Bruun-Hansen (to Åsane)
5	DF	NOR	Eivind Helgesen (on loan to Gjøvik-Lyn)
11	FW	NOR	Oskar Johannes Løken (released)
14	MF	NOR	Erik Franke Saunes (to Bryne)
17	DF	FRO	Jann Benjaminsen (to (Faroe Islands) B36)
18	MF	NOR	Kristoffer Strand Ødven (loan return to Aalesund)
19	DF	NOR	Ola Heltne Nilsen (to Åsane)
20	MF	NOR	Syver Skundberg Skeide (to Bodø/Glimt)
30	FW	NOR	Andreas Helmersen (loan return to Raufoss)
82	GK	LAT	Deniss Korneičiks (released)

=== Jerv ===
In: Note: Flags indicate national team as defined under FIFA eligibility rules; some limited exceptions apply. Players may hold more than one non-FIFA nationality.

No.	Pos.	Nation	Player
1	GK	NOR	Andreas Olsvoll (loan return from Ullern)
3	DF	FRA	Lucas Larade (from (France) Cercle Brugge)
4	DF	RWA	Ange Mutsinzi (from (Portugal) Trofense)
11	FW	POR	Samuel Pedro (from (Slovenia) Olimpija Ljubljana)
16	DF	NOR	Håkon Krogelien (loan return from Express)
18	MF	NOR	Andrè Rosmer Richstad (from Fløy)
21	MF	NOR	Sondre Auklend (on loan from Viking)
24	DF	NOR	Jesper Skuseth Myklebust (from Træff)
25	MF	FIN	Daniel Håkans (from (Finland) SJK, previously on loan)
27	DF	FRA	Enzo Philibert (from (France) Nîmes Olympique B)
88	FW	NOR	Eskil Topland Duesund (promoted from junior squad)
—	FW	NOR	Josias Furaha (from Grorud)

Out: Note: Flags indicate national team as defined under FIFA eligibility rules; some limited exceptions apply. Players may hold more than one non-FIFA nationality.

No.	Pos.	Nation	Player
1	GK	NOR	Amund Wichne (to Haugesund)
4	DF	CAF	Dylan Mboumbouni (to (Romania) Mioveni)
7	MF	CPV	Willis Furtado (to (Finland) KTP)
11	FW	GER	Felix Schröter (to (United States) Tampa Bay Rowdies)
14	DF	NOR	Ole Martin Kolskogen (loan return to Brann)
16	DF	NOR	John Olav Norheim (to HamKam)
17	FW	GUI	Amadou Diallo (to (Romania) Mioveni)
21	MF	NOR	Ask Tjærandsen-Skau (loan return to Bodø/Glimt)
25	MF	FIN	Daniel Håkans (to Vålerenga)
27	DF	DEN	Mathias Haarup (to (Denmark) Hobro)
35	MF	NOR	Bendik Kristiansen (to Ørn Horten)
42	DF	NOR	Noah Beisland (to Express, previously on loan)
—	FW	NOR	Josias Furaha (on loan to Fløy)

=== KFUM ===
In: Note: Flags indicate national team as defined under FIFA eligibility rules; some limited exceptions apply. Players may hold more than one non-FIFA nationality.

No.	Pos.	Nation	Player
5	DF	NOR	Akinsola Akinyemi (from Grorud)
12	GK	NOR	Andreas Vedeler (from Eidsvold Turn)
13	GK	NOR	Morten Stakkeng Vang (promoted from junior squad)
16	DF	NOR	Jonas Lange Hjorth (from Follo)
17	MF	NOR	Teodor Berg Haltvik (from Raufoss)
18	FW	NOR	Obilor Okeke (from Fredrikstad)
19	FW	NOR	Yasir Sa'Ad (from Skeid 2)
22	FW	NOR	Petter Nosakhare Dahl (on loan from Bodø/Glimt)
25	MF	NOR	Sverre Sandal (loan return from Nordstrand)
27	FW	NOR	Andreas Hegdahl Gundersen (from Levanger)
29	DF	NOR	Kristoffer Lassen Harrison (from Stabæk)

Out: Note: Flags indicate national team as defined under FIFA eligibility rules; some limited exceptions apply. Players may hold more than one non-FIFA nationality.

No.	Pos.	Nation	Player
5	DF	NOR	Aaron Kiil Olsen (to Vålerenga)
12	GK	NOR	Mats Gulbrandsen Viken (to Sandefjord)
17	DF	NOR	Fredrik Kristensen Dahl (to Strømsgodset)
19	FW	NOR	Philip Eng Romsaas (released)
21	MF	NOR	Tore André Sørås (to HamKam)
22	FW	NOR	Petter Nosakhare Dahl (to Bodø/Glimt)
27	MF	NOR	Mohammed Mahnin (to Ull/Kisa)
28	GK	NOR	Jonas Vatne Brauti (to Arendal)
29	FW	NOR	Filip Møller Delaveris (loan return to Brann)
33	DF	NOR	Jørgen Hammer (retired)

=== Kongsvinger ===
In: Note: Flags indicate national team as defined under FIFA eligibility rules; some limited exceptions apply. Players may hold more than one non-FIFA nationality.

No.	Pos.	Nation	Player
2	DF	NOR	Oscar Solnørdal (on loan from Aalesund)
7	MF	GHA	Eric Taylor (from (Ghana) New Life Academy, previously on loan)
8	MF	NOR	Vegard Leikvoll Moberg (from Brann)
11	MF	NOR	Sander Marthinussen (loan return from Arendal)
12	DF	NOR	Mats Haakenstad (from Sandefjord)
16	DF	NOR	Martin Hellan (from Stabæk U20)
18	FW	NOR	Joacim Holtan (on loan from Haugesund)
20	MF	NOR	Jesper Grundt (loan return from Moss)
25	MF	NOR	Marius Øien Damhaug (promoted from junior squad)
31	GK	NOR	Andreas Smedplass (loan return from Vard)

Out: Note: Flags indicate national team as defined under FIFA eligibility rules; some limited exceptions apply. Players may hold more than one non-FIFA nationality.

No.	Pos.	Nation	Player
2	DF	NOR	Trace Akino Murray (to Aalesund)
8	FW	NOR	Martin Hoel Andersen (to Sarpsborg 08)
12	GK	NOR	Isak Midttun Solberg (to Skeid)
18	MF	NOR	Tobias Bjørnebye (to (Denmark) Esbjerg)
24	MF	NOR	Oliver Banken Sandberg (on loan to Elverum)
26	FW	NOR	Mathias Bringaker (to Mjøndalen)
27	DF	NOR	Martin André Sjølstad (loan return to Kristiansund)
30	GK	SVK	Peter Rusina (released)

=== Kristiansund ===
In: Note: Flags indicate national team as defined under FIFA eligibility rules; some limited exceptions apply. Players may hold more than one non-FIFA nationality.

No.	Pos.	Nation	Player
9	FW	NOR	Benjamin Stokke (from Mjøndalen)
16	DF	NOR	Mikkel Ceïde (on loan from Rosenborg)
20	FW	NOR	Elias Myrlid (on loan from Brann 2)
21	MF	NOR	Marius Sivertsen Broholm (on loan from Rosenborg)
22	DF	NOR	Marius Olsen (from Levanger)
23	MF	NOR	Heine Gikling Bruseth (loan return from Levanger)
36	DF	NOR	Bendik Brevik (loan return from Levanger)

Out: Note: Flags indicate national team as defined under FIFA eligibility rules; some limited exceptions apply. Players may hold more than one non-FIFA nationality.

No.	Pos.	Nation	Player
4	DF	NOR	Henrik Gjesdal (to Moss)
10	MF	SWE	Liridon Kalludra (to (Sweden) Oddevold)
12	GK	SWE	Elias Hadaya (to (Sweden) Utsikten, previously on loan at Bryne)
13	FW	NOR	Bendik Bye (to Ranheim)
21	MF	SEN	Amidou Diop (to Aalesund)
22	DF	NOR	Martin André Sjølstad (to Sogndal, previously on loan at Kongsvinger)
23	FW	ETH	Amin Askar (to Moss)
27	FW	NOR	Pawel Chrupalla (loan return to Rosenborg)
29	FW	CMR	Faris Pemi Moumbagna (to Bodø/Glimt)

=== Mjøndalen ===
In: Note: Flags indicate national team as defined under FIFA eligibility rules; some limited exceptions apply. Players may hold more than one non-FIFA nationality.

No.	Pos.	Nation	Player
9	FW	NOR	Mathias Bringaker (from Kongsvinger)
13	GK	NOR	Sondre Svanes Strand (from Vidar)
14	MF	NOR	Keerat Singh (from Strømsgodset 2)
23	DF	NED	Quint Jansen (from Sandefjord)
27	MF	NOR	Kristoffer Tokstad (from Strømsgodset)

Out: Note: Flags indicate national team as defined under FIFA eligibility rules; some limited exceptions apply. Players may hold more than one non-FIFA nationality.

No.	Pos.	Nation	Player
1	GK	IRI	Sosha Makani (released)
3	DF	DEN	Daniel Arrocha (to Sogndal)
9	FW	NOR	Benjamin Stokke (to Kristiansund)
13	GK	NOR	Erik Hejer (to Asker)
19	FW	NOR	Magnus Bækken (to Strømmen, previously on loan at Notodden)
27	FW	NOR	Frank Bamenye (to Ørn Horten, previously on loan)
31	MF	SWE	Albin Sporrong (on loan to (Sweden) Östersund)

=== Moss ===
In: Note: Flags indicate national team as defined under FIFA eligibility rules; some limited exceptions apply. Players may hold more than one non-FIFA nationality.

No.	Pos.	Nation	Player
4	DF	NOR	Henrik Gjesdal (from Kristiansund)
5	DF	NOR	Ilir Kukleci (from Frigg)
6	MF	CGO	Kaya Makosso (on loan from (Spain) Vélez)
7	FW	ETH	Amin Askar (from Kristiansund)
10	FW	DEN	Lorent Callaku (from Strømmen)
17	MF	SEN	Laurent Mendy (from Sarpsborg 08)
21	DF	USA	Ian Hoffmann (from (United States) Houston Dynamo)
25	MF	NOR	Adan Abadala Hussein (from Bodø/Glimt)
27	DF	NOR	Sivert Haugli (free transfer)

Out: Note: Flags indicate national team as defined under FIFA eligibility rules; some limited exceptions apply. Players may hold more than one non-FIFA nationality.

No.	Pos.	Nation	Player
4	MF	NOR	Stian Andersen (to Arendal)
5	DF	FRA	Emmanuel Troudart (released)
6	DF	NOR	Mathusan Sandrakumar (to Grorud)
8	MF	NOR	Marius Hagen (to Notodden)
10	FW	NOR	Thomas Klaussen (retired)
12	GK	NOR	Nicklas Lagesen (to Sprint-Jeløy)
16	DF	NOR	Samuel Skarnes Gray (to Frigg)
17	MF	NOR	Phillipe Koko (to Arendal)
21	GK	ESP	Daniel Rojas (released)
24	DF	NOR	Markus Olsvik Welinder (loan return to Sarpsborg 08)
28	FW	NOR	Thierry Dabove (to Gamle Oslo)
29	MF	NOR	Jesper Grundt (loan return to Kongsvinger)
32	FW	DEN	Christian Wagner (loan return to (Denmark) Viborg)

=== Ranheim ===
In: Note: Flags indicate national team as defined under FIFA eligibility rules; some limited exceptions apply. Players may hold more than one non-FIFA nationality.

No.	Pos.	Nation	Player
9	FW	NOR	Bendik Bye (from Kristiansund)
10	MF	NOR	John Hou Sæter (from (China) Beijing Guoan)
12	GK	NOR	Francois Guillemot Venn (promoted from junior squad)
16	DF	NOR	Lasse Qvigstad (on loan from Rosenborg 2)
19	FW	NOR	Dennis Bakke Gaustad (from Rosenborg 2)
20	FW	NOR	Arne Gunnes (on loan from Bryne)
21	MF	NOR	Morten Gamst Pedersen (from Åsane)

Out: Note: Flags indicate national team as defined under FIFA eligibility rules; some limited exceptions apply. Players may hold more than one non-FIFA nationality.

No.	Pos.	Nation	Player
9	FW	NOR	Michael Karlsen (retired)
10	FW	NOR	Vegard Erlien (to Tromsø)
11	FW	NOR	Marcus Mehnert (to Strømsgodset)
13	MF	NOR	Sevald Andreassen (on loan to Rana)
16	DF	NOR	Robert Williams (to Egersund)
17	FW	NOR	Magnus Høiseth (on loan to Egersund)
19	FW	NOR	Sondre Stokke (to Nardo)
20	MF	NOR	Jonas Sørensen Selnæs (released)
21	DF	NOR	Adrian Bartel (on loan to Stjørdals-Blink)
24	DF	NOR	Jarl Magnus Knutsen (to Stjørdals-Blink)
35	GK	NOR	Erland Tangvik (retired)

=== Raufoss ===
In: Note: Flags indicate national team as defined under FIFA eligibility rules; some limited exceptions apply. Players may hold more than one non-FIFA nationality.

No.	Pos.	Nation	Player
3	MF	NOR	Torjus Engebakken (promoted from junior squad)
7	FW	NOR	Andreas Østerud (from Gjøvik-Lyn)
9	FW	NOR	Andreas Helmersen (loan return from Hødd)
10	MF	SUI	Loris Mettler (from (Spain) Lleida Esportiu)
12	GK	NOR	Nima Hooshangi (promoted from junior squad)
14	DF	GHA	Jamal Deen Haruna (from (Ghana) Great Olympics)
18	MF	NOR	Kodjo Somesi (from Toten)
22	MF	NOR	Adrian Olsen Teigen (from Levanger)
27	DF	NOR	Simen Hagbø (from Levanger)
31	GK	NOR	Andreas Hippe Fagereng (from Brumunddal)

Out: Note: Flags indicate national team as defined under FIFA eligibility rules; some limited exceptions apply. Players may hold more than one non-FIFA nationality.

No.	Pos.	Nation	Player
3	DF	NOR	Amund Møllerhagen (to Brattvåg)
7	MF	CIV	Emile Noe Dadjo (to Halsen)
10	MF	NOR	Teodor Berg Haltvik (to KFUM)
14	MF	NOR	Tobias Flem (on loan to Brattvåg)
19	DF	NOR	Tobias Sagstuen Andersen (retired)
22	MF	NOR	Markus Karlsbakk (loan return to Aalesund)
23	GK	NOR	Rino Lund Johnsen (released)
28	FW	SEN	Mame Mor Ndiaye (to Åsane)
30	MF	NOR	Kristoffer Sørensen (released)

=== Sandnes Ulf ===
In: Note: Flags indicate national team as defined under FIFA eligibility rules; some limited exceptions apply. Players may hold more than one non-FIFA nationality.

No.	Pos.	Nation	Player
5	MF	NOR	Mathias Emilsen (on loan from Vålerenga)
6	DF	NOR	Christer Salvesen (promoted from junior squad)
14	MF	NOR	Fredrik Torsteinbø (from Viking)
15	FW	NOR	Henrik Jensen (from Ganddal)
16	DF	NOR	Erik Kringstad (from Sola)
25	FW	NOR	Endre Osenbroch (promoted from junior squad)

Out: Note: Flags indicate national team as defined under FIFA eligibility rules; some limited exceptions apply. Players may hold more than one non-FIFA nationality.

No.	Pos.	Nation	Player
5	MF	NOR	Lars Erik Sødal (loan return to Viking)
6	MF	NOR	Christian Landu Landu (to Bryne)
8	MF	NOR	Chris Sleveland (to Egersund, previously on loan)
9	MF	NOR	Jostein Ekeland (to Strømsgodset)
11	DF	NOR	Alexander Stølås (on loan to Aalesund)
14	DF	NOR	Torbjørn Lysaker Heggem (to (Sweden) Brommapojkarna)
16	MF	NOR	Arne Ravndal (to Ålgård)
25	MF	NOR	Sander Ringberg (to Hønefoss)
27	GK	NOR	Sander Lønning (on loan to Egersund)

=== Skeid ===
In: Note: Flags indicate national team as defined under FIFA eligibility rules; some limited exceptions apply. Players may hold more than one non-FIFA nationality.

No.	Pos.	Nation	Player
2	MF	NOR	Torje Naustdal (from Haugesund)
3	DF	NOR	Fredrik Flo (from Sandefjord)
12	GK	NOR	Simen Vidtun Nilsen (on loan from Sarpsborg 08)
13	FW	NOR	Andreas Stensrud (from Vålerenga 2)
14	MF	NOR	Henning Tønsberg Andersen (from Ull/Kisa)
20	MF	NOR	Fredrik Vinje (from Stjørdals-Blink)
27	FW	NOR	Kristoffer Hoven (from Sogndal, previously on loan)
34	FW	NOR	Nickolay Årsbog (from Asker)
50	GK	NOR	Isak Midttun Solberg (from Kongsvinger)
–	GK	NOR	Mats Trige (on loan from Tromsø)

Out: Note: Flags indicate national team as defined under FIFA eligibility rules; some limited exceptions apply. Players may hold more than one non-FIFA nationality.

No.	Pos.	Nation	Player
2	DF	NOR	Mats Pettersen Andersen (to Grorud)
4	DF	NOR	Fredrik Berglie (to Sandefjord)
8	DF	NOR	Stian Kommandantvold Pedersen (to Kjelsås)
12	GK	ISL	Palmi Arinbjörnsson (loan return to (England) Wolves U19)
19	DF	NOR	Matarr Kah (released)
22	MF	NOR	Jakob Napoleon Romsaas (to Tromsø)
30	GK	NOR	Kasper Lunde Ofstad (on loan to Lokomotiv Oslo)
35	DF	NOR	Ousmane Diallo Toure (on loan to Træff)
44	FW	NOR	Simen Kvia-Egeskog (loan return to Viking)
–	GK	NOR	Mats Trige (loan return to Tromsø)

=== Sogndal ===
In: Note: Flags indicate national team as defined under FIFA eligibility rules; some limited exceptions apply. Players may hold more than one non-FIFA nationality.

No.	Pos.	Nation	Player
4	DF	DEN	Daniel Arrocha (from Mjøndalen)
10	MF	NOR	Kasper Skaanes (from Brann)
17	DF	NOR	Martin André Sjølstad (from Kristiansund)
32	DF	NOR	Mathias Øren (promoted from junior squad)

Out: Note: Flags indicate national team as defined under FIFA eligibility rules; some limited exceptions apply. Players may hold more than one non-FIFA nationality.

No.	Pos.	Nation	Player
4	DF	NOR	Martin Ove Roseth (to Lillestrøm)
5	DF	NOR	Hörður Ingi Gunnarsson (to (Iceland) FH)
16	DF	NOR	Eirik Lereng (to Arendal)
18	FW	NOR	Kristoffer Hoven (to Skeid, previously on loan)
19	MF	NOR	Ulrik Mathisen (loan return to Lillestrøm)
22	DF	NOR	Philip Slørdahl (loan return to Lillestrøm)
31	GK	NOR	Sondre Nor Midthjell (to Aalesund 2)

=== Start ===
In: Note: Flags indicate national team as defined under FIFA eligibility rules; some limited exceptions apply. Players may hold more than one non-FIFA nationality.

No.	Pos.	Nation	Player
4	MF	NOR	Vajebah Sakor (free transfer)
12	GK	NOR	Herman Seierstad Johnsen (promoted from junior squad)
16	MF	SWE	Tom Strannegård (from (Sweden) AIK, previously on loan)
19	FW	NOR	Emil Grønn Pedersen (loan return from Fløy)
23	FW	NOR	Henrik Skogvold (on loan from Lillestrøm)
28	DF	NOR	Rolf Daniel Vikstøl (from Viking)
30	DF	NOR	Fabian Østigård Ness (from Grorud)
40	MF	NOR	Sindre Osestad (from (Malta) Floriana)
99	FW	SWE	Jack Lahne (on loan from (France) Amiens)

Out: Note: Flags indicate national team as defined under FIFA eligibility rules; some limited exceptions apply. Players may hold more than one non-FIFA nationality.

No.	Pos.	Nation	Player
5	DF	NOR	Peter Reinhardsen (to Sarpsborg 08)
17	DF	NOR	August Frobenius (to Bærum)
20	FW	ENG	Cameron Cresswell (released)
22	DF	NOR	Kristoffer Tønnessen (to Lillestrøm)
30	DF	GEQ	Basilio Ndong (to (Romania) Universitatea Craiova)
43	DF	NOR	Lyder Daland (to Vindbjart, previously on loan at Express)
88	FW	NOR	Joacim Holtan (loan return to Haugesund)
99	GK	NOR	Sondre Solås (to Vidar)

=== Åsane ===
In: Note: Flags indicate national team as defined under FIFA eligibility rules; some limited exceptions apply. Players may hold more than one non-FIFA nationality.

No.	Pos.	Nation	Player
6	DF	NOR	Ola Heltne Nilsen (from Hødd)
8	MF	NOR	Emil Sildnes (from Hamkam)
10	FW	NOR	Jacob Jacobsen Bolsø (from Træff)
15	DF	NOR	Sander Eng Strand (from Bærum)
17	DF	NOR	Magnus Bruun-Hansen (from Hødd)
18	MF	NOR	Ole Kallevåg (loan return from Lysekloster)
21	FW	NOR	Jon Berisha (promoted from junior squad)
25	MF	NOR	Emmanuel Tchotcho Bangoura (promoted from junior squad)
26	MF	NOR	Thomas Roger Lotsberg (promoted from junior squad)
28	FW	SEN	Mame Mor Ndiaye (from Raufoss)

Out: Note: Flags indicate national team as defined under FIFA eligibility rules; some limited exceptions apply. Players may hold more than one non-FIFA nationality.

No.	Pos.	Nation	Player
4	DF	NOR	Jonas Eide Vågen (on loan to OS)
6	DF	NOR	Bjarte Haugsdal (released)
8	FW	NOR	Niklas Edris Haugland (loan return to Molde)
8	MF	NOR	Kristoffer Valsvik (released)
10	MF	ERI	Senai Hagos (to Lysekloster)
11	MF	NOR	Henrik Gjerde Ødemark (on loan to Lysekloster)
12	MF	NOR	Morten Gamst Pedersen (to Ranheim)
15	DF	NOR	Emil Kalsaas (to Sotra)
17	MF	NOR	Ryan Doghman (to (United States) Orange County)
24	DF	DEN	Oliver Juul Jensen (to (Denmark) Roskilde)
