= 2023 Aalesunds FK season =

Aalesund
2023 season
- Chairman: Jan Petter Hagen
- Head coach: Lars Arne Nilsen (until 4 May); Marius Bøe (interim) (4 May - 13 June); Christian Johnsen (from 13 June)
- Stadium: Color Line Stadion
- Eliteserien: 16th (relegated)
- Norwegian Cup: Third round
- Top goalscorer: League: Isaac Atanga; Markus Karlsbakk (5 each); All: Markus Karlsbakk (9)
- Biggest win: Byåsen 1–6 Aalesund
- Biggest defeat: Sandefjord 4–0 Aalesund
| Home colours | Away colours |

The 2023 season was Aalesunds FK's 109th season in existence and the club's second consecutive season in the top flight of Norwegian football. In addition to the domestic league, Aalesunds FK participated in this season's edition of the Norwegian Football Cup.

== Players ==
=== First-team squad ===
As of 4 September 2023

Note: Flags indicate national team as defined under FIFA eligibility rules; some limited exceptions apply. Players may hold more than one non-FIFA nationality.

| No. | Pos. | Nation | Player |
|---|---|---|---|
| 1 | GK | NOR | Sten Grytebust |
| 2 | DF | JAM | Trace Murray |
| 3 | DF | NOR | Jeppe Moe |
| 4 | DF | NOR | Nikolai Hopland |
| 5 | DF | SWE | David Fällman |
| 6 | MF | NOR | Erlend Segberg |
| 7 | MF | DEN | Tobias Klysner (on loan from Randers) |
| 8 | MF | NOR | Håkon Butli Hammer |
| 9 | FW | DEN | Alexander Ammitzbøll |
| 11 | FW | NGR | Moses Ebiye |
| 13 | GK | USA | Michael Lansing |
| 15 | FW | NOR | Kristoffer Ødemarksbakken |
| 18 | FW | NOR | Martin Ramsland |
| 19 | FW | GHA | Isaac Atanga |

| No. | Pos. | Nation | Player |
|---|---|---|---|
| 20 | MF | NOR | Oscar Solnørdal |
| 21 | MF | SEN | Amidou Diop |
| 22 | MF | NOR | Markus Karlsbakk |
| 23 | DF | NOR | Erik Ansok Frøysa |
| 25 | DF | NOR | John Kitolano |
| 26 | GK | NOR | Tor Erik Valderhaug Larsen |
| 27 | FW | SEN | Moctar Diop |
| 29 | FW | NOR | Bjørn Martin Kristensen |
| 30 | DF | DEN | Alexander Juel Andersen |
| 32 | MF | NOR | Kristoffer Strand Ødven |
| 33 | DF | NOR | Simen Vatne Haram |
| 34 | DF | NOR | Stian Aarønes Holte |
| 36 | DF | NOR | Christian Breivik |
| 37 | DF | NOR | Henrik Molvær Melland |

=== Out on loan ===
Note: Flags indicate national team as defined under FIFA eligibility rules; some limited exceptions apply. Players may hold more than one non-FIFA nationality.

| No. | Pos. | Nation | Player |
|---|---|---|---|
| — | DF | NOR | Ole Martin Kolskogen (at Åsane until 31 December 2023) |
| — | MF | NOR | Kristoffer Barmen (at Åsane until 31 December 2023) |

| No. | Pos. | Nation | Player |
|---|---|---|---|
| — | FW | SEN | Mamadou Diaw (at Sandnes until 31 December 2023) |

== Transfers ==
=== Winter ===
In: Note: Flags indicate national team as defined under FIFA eligibility rules; some limited exceptions apply. Players may hold more than one non-FIFA nationality.

| No. | Pos. | Nation | Player |
|---|---|---|---|
| 2 | DF | NOR | Trace Akino Murray (from Kongsvinger) |
| 7 | FW | DEN | Kasper Lunding (from (Netherlands) Heracles) |
| 14 | DF | NOR | Ole Martin Kolskogen (from Brann) |
| 19 | MF | GHA | Isaac Atanga (from (United States) Cincinnati) |
| 21 | MF | SEN | Amidou Diop (from Kristiansund) |
| 22 | MF | NOR | Markus Karlsbakk (loan return from Raufoss) |
| 23 | DF | NOR | Alexander Stølås (on loan from Sandnes Ulf) |
| 26 | GK | NOR | Tor Erik Valderhaug Larsen (loan return from Stjørdals-Blink) |
| 27 | FW | SEN | Moctar Diop (from (Senegal) Espoirs de Guediewaye) |
| 31 | DF | DEN | Alexander Munksgaard (on loan from (Denmark) AGF) |
| 32 | MF | NOR | Kristoffer Strand Ødven (loan return from Hødd) |
| 33 | DF | NOR | Simen Vatne Haram (promoted from junior squad) |
| 34 | DF | NOR | Stian Aarønes Holte (loan return from Brattvåg) |

Out: Note: Flags indicate national team as defined under FIFA eligibility rules; some limited exceptions apply. Players may hold more than one non-FIFA nationality.

| No. | Pos. | Nation | Player |
|---|---|---|---|
| 2 | DF | SRB | Petar Golubović (to (Russia) Khimki) |
| 7 | MF | CPV | Erikson Lima (released) |
| 8 | MF | NOR | Fredrik Haugen (to Stabæk) |
| 11 | MF | NOR | Simen Bolkan Nordli (to (Denmark) Randers) |
| 14 | FW | NOR | Torbjørn Kallevåg (to Hødd) |
| 20 | DF | NOR | Oscar Solnørdal (on loan to Kongsvinger) |
| 23 | FW | GHA | Gilbert Koomson (loan return to Bodø/Glimt) |
| 25 | DF | BIH | Besim Šerbečić (to (Bosnia and Herzegovina) Sarajevo) |
| 27 | MF | CRO | Dario Čanađija (to (Croatia) Šibenik) |
| 33 | DF | NOR | Simen Rafn (to Fredrikstad) |

=== Summer ===
In: Note: Flags indicate national team as defined under FIFA eligibility rules; some limited exceptions apply. Players may hold more than one non-FIFA nationality.

| No. | Pos. | Nation | Player |
|---|---|---|---|
| 7 | FW | DEN | Tobias Klysner (on loan from (Denmark) Randers) |
| 8 | MF | NOR | Håkon Butli Hammer (from Raufoss)/> |
| 18 | FW | NOR | Martin Ramsland (from Sandnes Ulf) |
| 20 | DF | NOR | Oscar Solnørdal (loan return from Kongsvinger) |
| 23 | DF | NOR | Erik Ansok Frøysa (from Aalesund) |
| 35 | DF | NOR | Sebastian Berntsen (promoted from junior squad) |
| 40 | MF | NOR | Eivind Kolve (promoted from junior squad) |
| 41 | MF | NOR | Iver Krogh Hagen (promoted from junior squad) |
| 42 | MF | NOR | Sander Hestetun Kilen (promoted from junior squad) |
| 48 | GK | NOR | Sondre Nor Midthjell (promoted from junior squad) |

Out: Note: Flags indicate national team as defined under FIFA eligibility rules; some limited exceptions apply. Players may hold more than one non-FIFA nationality.

| No. | Pos. | Nation | Player |
|---|---|---|---|
| 10 | MF | NOR | Kristoffer Barmen (to Åsane) |
| 14 | DF | NOR | Ole Martin Kolskogen (on loan to Åsane) |
| 17 | FW | SEN | Mamadou Diaw (on loan to Sandnes Ulf, previously on loan at Bryne) |
| 18 | MF | NOR | Kristoffer Strand Ødven (released) |
| 23 | DF | NOR | Alexander Stølås (loan return to Sandnes Ulf) |
| 31 | DF | DEN | Alexander Munksgaard (loan return to (Denmark) AGF) |

== Pre-season and friendlies ==
Win Draw Loss Fixtures

| 2 April 2023 Friendly | Aalesund (Norway) | 1–0 | (Norway) Kristiansund | Ålesund |
| 16:00 CEST (UTC+2) | | Report | | Stadium: Color Line Stadion |

== Competitions ==
=== Overview ===
| Competition | First match | Last match | Starting round | Final position | Record | | | | | | | |
| Competition | First match | Last match | Starting round | Final position | Pld | W | D | L | GF | GA | GD | Win % |
|---|---|---|---|---|---|---|---|---|---|---|---|---|
| Eliteserien | 10 April 2023 | 3 December 2023 | Matchday 1 | 16th | 30 | 5 | 3 | 22 | 23 | 63 | −40 | 16.67 |
| Norwegian Cup | 24 May 2023 | 7 June 2023 | First round | Third round | 3 | 2 | 1 | 0 | 13 | 4 | +9 | 66.67 |
| Total | | | | | 33 | 7 | 4 | 22 | 36 | 67 | −31 | 21.21 |

Source: Soccerway

=== Eliteserien ===
==== League table ====
| Pos | Team | Pld | W | D | L | GF | GA | GD | Pts | Qualification or relegation |
|---|---|---|---|---|---|---|---|---|---|---|
| 12 | Haugesund | 30 | 9 | 6 | 15 | 34 | 40 | −6 | 33 | |
| 13 | Sandefjord | 30 | 8 | 7 | 15 | 47 | 55 | −8 | 31 | |
| 14 | Vålerenga (R) | 30 | 7 | 8 | 15 | 39 | 50 | −11 | 29 | Qualification for the relegation play-offs |
| 15 | Stabæk (R) | 30 | 7 | 8 | 15 | 30 | 48 | −18 | 29 | Relegation to First Division |
| 16 | Aalesund (R) | 30 | 5 | 3 | 22 | 23 | 73 | −50 | 18 | Relegation to First Division |

Source: Football Association of Norway (in Norwegian)
Rules for classification: 1) Points; 2) Goal difference; 3) Goals scored; 4) Head-to-head points; 5) Head-to-head goal difference; 6) Head-to-head goals scored.
(R) Relegated

==== Results summary ====
| Overall | | | | | | | | Home | | | | | | Away | | | | | |
| Pld | W | D | L | GF | GA | GD | Pts | W | D | L | GF | GA | GD | W | D | L | GF | GA | GD |
|---|---|---|---|---|---|---|---|---|---|---|---|---|---|---|---|---|---|---|---|
| 30 | 5 | 3 | 22 | 23 | 73 | −50 | 18 | 4 | 3 | 8 | 13 | 27 | −14 | 1 | 0 | 14 | 10 | 46 | −36 |

==== Results by round ====
| Round | 1 | 2 | 3 | 4 | 5 | 6 | 7 | 8 | 9 | 10 | 11 | 12 | 13 | 14 | 15 | 16 | 17 | 18 | 19 | 20 | 21 | 22 | 23 | 24 | 25 | 26 | 27 | 28 | 29 | 30 |
|---|---|---|---|---|---|---|---|---|---|---|---|---|---|---|---|---|---|---|---|---|---|---|---|---|---|---|---|---|---|---|
| Ground | H | A | H | A | H | A | H | A | H | H | A | H | A | H | A | H | A | H | A | A | H | A | H | A | H | A | H | A | H | A |
| Result | L | L | L | L | D | L | W | L | L | L | L | W | L | L | L | W | L | L | L | L | D | L | D | W | W | L | L | L | L | L |
| Position | 11 | 16 | 16 | 16 | 16 | 16 | 16 | 16 | 16 | 16 | 16 | 15 | 16 | 16 | 16 | 16 | 16 | 16 | 16 | 16 | 16 | 16 | 16 | 16 | 16 | 16 | 16 | 16 | 16 | 16 |

Updated to match(es) played on 12 November 2023. Source:
A = Away; H = Home; W = Win; D = Draw; L = Loss

==== Matches ====
The league fixtures were announced on 9 December 2022.

| 10 April 2023 1 | Aalesund | 0–1 | Vålerenga | Ålesund |
| 17:00 CEST (UTC+2) | | Report | Håkans 79' | Stadium: Color Line Stadion; Attendance: 6,876; Referee: Kristoffer Hagenes |

| 16 April 2023 2 | Strømsgodset | 1–0 | Aalesund | Drammen |
| 17:00 CEST (UTC+2) | Valsvik 42' | Report | | Stadium: Marienlyst Stadion; Attendance: 5,014; Referee: Daniel Higraff |

| 23 April 2023 3 | Aalesund | 0–3 | Bodø/Glimt | Ålesund |
| 17:00 CEST (UTC+2) | | Report | Grønbæk 6'; Pemi 17'; Pellegrino 59' | Stadium: Color Line Stadion; Attendance: 4,950; Referee: Mohammad Usman Aslam |

| 30 April 2023 4 | Sandefjord | 4–0 | Aalesund | Sandefjord |
| 17:00 CEST (UTC+2) | Al-Saed 6'; Fällman 43' (o.g.); Taaje 61'; Chaib 90' | Report | | Stadium: Release Arena; Attendance: 3,086; Referee: Ajdin Medic |

| 3 May 2023 17 | Molde | 3–0 | Aalesund | Molde |
| 18:00 CEST (UTC+2) | Linnes 58'; Grødem 69'; Mannsverk 90+1' (pen.) | Report | | Stadium: Aker Stadion; Attendance: 6,135; Referee: Rohit Saggi |

| 7 May 2023 5 | Aalesund | 0–0 | Haugesund | Ålesund |
| 17:00 CEST (UTC+2) | | Report | | Stadium: Color Line Stadion; Attendance: 4,471; Referee: Ola Hobber Nilsen |

| 13 May 2023 6 | Stabæk | 1–0 | Aalesund | Bærum |
| 17:00 CEST (UTC+2) | Kabran 76' | Report | | Stadium: Nadderud Stadion; Attendance: 2,602; Referee: Tore Hansen |

| 16 May 2023 7 | Aalesund | 3–1 | Molde | Ålesund |
| 18:00 CEST (UTC+2) | Ebiye 41' (pen.); Atanga 57', 61' | Report | Ødegård 90+1' | Stadium: Color Line Stadion; Attendance: 9,050; Referee: Sivert Øksnes Amland |

| 29 May 2023 8 | Sarpsborg 08 | 3–1 | Aalesund | Sarpsborg |
| 17:00 CEST (UTC+2) | Bonsu Baah 19'; Soltvedt 36'; Utvik 68' | Report | Atanga 39' | Stadium: Sarpsborg Stadion; Attendance: 5,435; Referee: Svein Tore Sinnes |

| 4 June 2023 9 | Aalesund | 1–3 | Brann | Ålesund |
| 17:00 CEST (UTC+2) | Ebiye 44' | Report | Heltne Nilsen 48' (pen.); Castro 80'; Mathisen 90' | Stadium: Color Line Stadion; Attendance: 5,331; Referee: Marius Hansen Grøtta |

| 11 June 2023 10 | Aalesund | 2–3 | Tromsø | Ålesund |
| 17:00 CEST (UTC+2) | Kristensen 24'; Karlsbakk 81' | Report | Erlien 40', 54'; Vesterlund 73' | Stadium: Color Line Stadion; Attendance: 4,042; Referee: Daniel Higraff |

| 2 July 2023 12 | Aalesund | 1–0 | Rosenborg | Ålesund |
| 17:00 CEST (UTC+2) | Karlsbakk 47' | Report | | Stadium: Color Line Stadion; Attendance: 6,209; Referee: Marius Lien |

| 7 July 2023 13 | HamKam | 2–1 | Aalesund | Hamar |
| 19:00 CEST (UTC+2) | Udahl 66'; Opsahl 80' | Report | Karlsbakk 71' | Stadium: Briskeby Stadion; Attendance: 3,244; Referee: Christian Moen |

| 16 July 2023 14 | Aalesund | 0–3 | Odd | Ålesund |
| 17:00 CEST (UTC+2) | | Report | Ruud 46', 70'; Tomas 75' | Stadium: Color Line Stadion; Attendance: 4,461; Referee: Rohit Saggi |

| 19 July 2023 11 | Lillestrøm | 5–1 | Aalesund | Lillestrøm |
| 18:00 CEST (UTC+2) | Ibrahimaj 30'; Skjærvik 31'; Adams 56'; Lehne Olsen 78', 81' | Report | Atanga 11' | Stadium: Åråsen Stadion; Attendance: 5,853; Referee: Kristoffer Hagenes |

| 24 July 2023 15 | Viking | 3–1 | Aalesund | Stavanger |
| 19:00 CEST (UTC+2) | Brekalo 24'; Tripić 70' (pen.), 90' | Report | Segberg 40' | Stadium: Viking Stadion; Attendance: 11,089; Referee: Svein Tore Sinnes |

| 30 July 2023 16 | Aalesund | 1–0 | Strømsgodset | Ålesund |
| 17:00 CEST (UTC+2) | Kristensen 90+3' | Report | | Stadium: Color Line Stadion; Attendance: 4,303; Referee: Jan Morten Tennøy |

| 13 August 2023 18 | Aalesund | 0–2 | HamKam | Ålesund |
| 17:00 CEST (UTC+2) | | Report | Kirkevold 39', 47' | Stadium: Color Line Stadion; Attendance: 5,864; Referee: Espen Eskås |

| 20 August 2023 19 | Brann | 5–1 | Aalesund | Bergen |
| 17:00 CEST (UTC+2) | Børsting 18'; Horn Myhre 24'; Castro 44'; Finne 54'; Heggebø 80' | Report | Atanga 52' | Stadium: Brann Stadion; Attendance: 13,317; Referee: Christian Moen |

| 27 August 2023 20 | Rosenborg | 4–0 | Aalesund | Trondheim |
| 17:00 CEST (UTC+2) | Wiedesheim-Paul 14'; Holse 23'; Nypan 67'; Cornic 90' | Report | | Stadium: Lerkendal Stadion; Attendance: 11,020; Referee: Marius Lien |

| 3 September 2023 21 | Aalesund | 1–1 | Lillestrøm | Ålesund |
| 17:00 CEST (UTC+2) | Kristensen 64' | Report | Lehne Olsen 12' | Stadium: Color Line Stadion; Attendance: 4,418; Referee: Daniel Higraff |

| 17 September 2023 22 | Vålerenga | 3–1 | Aalesund | Oslo |
| 19:15 CEST (UTC+2) | Ilić 17', 54'; Hagen 50' | Report | Ramsland 13' | Stadium: Intility Arena; Attendance: 7,769; Referee: Kai Erik Steen |

| 23 September 2023 23 | Aalesund | 1–1 | Stabæk | Ålesund |
| 18:00 CEST (UTC+2) | Segberg 16' | Report | Kostadinov 45+1' | Stadium: Color Line Stadion; Attendance: 4,562; Referee: Mohammad Usman Aslam |

| 8 October 2023 24 | Tromsø | 1–2 | Aalesund | Tromsø |
| 17:00 CEST (UTC+2) | Erlien 52' | Report | Karlsbakk 45+2'; Hammer 88' | Stadium: Romssa Arena; Attendance: 4,613; Referee: Ajdin Medic |

| 22 October 2023 25 | Aalesund | 3–2 | Sarpsborg 08 | Ålesund |
| 17:00 CEST (UTC+2) | Karlsbakk 38' (pen.); Kristensen 40'; Moses 90+1' | Report | A. Diop 23' (o.g.); Maigaard 43' | Stadium: Color Line Stadion; Attendance: 4,348; Referee: Svein Tore Sinnes |

| 28 October 2023 26 | Haugesund | 6–1 | Aalesund | Haugesund |
| 18:00 CET (UTC+1) | Niyukuri 7'; Hopland 11' (o.g.); Søderlund 38'; Krygård 80'; Therkildsen 90+1'; Diarra 90+6' | Report | M. Diop 77' | Stadium: Haugesund Stadion; Attendance: 5,016; Referee: Marius Lien |

| 6 November 2023 27 | Aalesund | 0–3 | Sandefjord | Ålesund |
| 19:00 CET (UTC+1) | | Report | Dunsby 49'; Al-Saed 72'; Ruud Tveter 81' | Stadium: Color Line Stadion; Attendance: 4,720; Referee: Kristoffer Hagenes |

| 12 November 2023 28 | Bodø/Glimt | 1–0 | Aalesund | Bodø |
| 17:00 CEST (UTC+1) | Hopland 37' (o.g.) | Report | | Stadium: Aspmyra Stadion; Attendance: 7,851; Referee: Steinar Hauge |

| 26 November 2023 29 | Aalesund | 0–4 | Viking | Ålesund |
| 17:00 CET (UTC+1) | | Report | D. Diop 2'; Adegbenro 11'; Svendsen 56'; Tripić 88' | Stadium: Color Line Stadion; Attendance: 4,630; Referee: Sivert Øksnes Amland |

| 3 December 2023 30 | Odd | 4–1 | Aalesund | Skien |
| 17:00 CET (UTC+1) | M. Diop 13' (o.g.); Ingebrigtsen 31'; Jørgensen 83'; Skau 90+1' | Report | M. Diop 37' | Stadium: Skagerak Arena; Attendance: 3,844; Referee: Kristoffer Hagenes |

=== Norwegian Football Cup ===
| 24 May 2023 First round | Eid | 0–4 | Aalesund | Nordfjordeid |
| 18:00 CEST (UTC+2) | | Report | Segberg 11'; Moses 34'; Atanga 39'; Holmøyvik 85' (o.g.) | Stadium: Eid Stadion; Attendance: 1,400; Referee: Jonas Sande Mossestad |

| 1 June 2023 Second round | Byåsen | 1–6 | Aalesund | Trondheim |
| 18:00 CEST (UTC+2) | Murray 38' (o.g.) | Report | Karlsbakk 12', 35' (pen.); Kristensen 45'; Ødemarksbakken 62'; Barmen 75', 80' | Stadium: Byåsen Arena; Attendance: 286; Referee: Bendik Haarberg |

| 7 June 2023 Third round | Aalesund | 3–3 (a.e.t.) (5–6 p) | Brann | Ålesund |
| 18:00 CEST (UTC+2) | Atanga 25'; Karlsbakk 43' (pen.), 97' | Report; Penalties | Crone 37'; Pedersen 88'; Blomberg 101' | Stadium: Color Line Stadion; Attendance: 1,400; Referee: Mohammad Usman Aslam |
| | Penalties |
| | Segberg (penalty scored); Karlsbakk (penalty missed); Lunding (penalty scored); Hopland (penalty scored); Juel (penalty missed); Ødemarksbakken (penalty scored); Kolskogen (penalty scored); Diop (penalty missed) | | (penalty scored) Finne; (penalty missed) Blomberg; (penalty scored) Myhre; (penalty scored) Myrlid; (penalty missed) Rasmussen; (penalty scored) Kristiansen; (penalty scored) Wolfe; (penalty scored) Hjorteseth |
