= 2022 Aalesunds FK season =

Aalesund
2022 season
- Chairman: Jan Petter Hagen
- Head coach: Lars Arne Nilsen
- Stadium: Color Line Stadion
- Eliteserien: 9th
- Norwegian Cup: Third round
- Top goalscorer: League: Sigurd Hauso Haugen (7); All: Sigurd Hauso Haugen (8)
Home colours	Away colours

The 2022 season was Aalesunds FK's 108th season in existence and the club's first season return in the top flight of Norwegian football. In addition to the domestic league, Aalesunds FK participating in this season's edition of the Norwegian Football Cup.

== Players ==
=== First-team squad ===
As of 13 August 2022

Note: Flags indicate national team as defined under FIFA eligibility rules; some limited exceptions apply. Players may hold more than one non-FIFA nationality.

No.	Pos.	Nation	Player
1	GK	NOR	Sten Grytebust
2	DF	SRB	Petar Golubović
3	DF	NOR	Jeppe Moe
5	DF	SWE	David Fällman
6	MF	NOR	Erlend Segberg
7	MF	CPV	Erikson Lima
8	MF	NOR	Fredrik Haugen
9	FW	DEN	Alexander Ammitzbøll
10	MF	NOR	Kristoffer Barmen
11	MF	NOR	Simen Bolkan Nordli
13	GK	USA	Michael Lansing
14	MF	NOR	Torbjørn Kallevåg
15	FW	NOR	Kristoffer Ødemarksbakken

No.	Pos.	Nation	Player
16	DF	NOR	John Kitolano
18	DF	NOR	Nikolai Søyset Hopland
20	MF	NOR	Oscar Solnørdal
21	FW	NGA	Moses Ebiye
23	FW	GHA	Gilbert Koomson (on loan from Bodø/Glimt)
24	GK	NOR	Eirik Brandal Bjørnevik
25	DF	BIH	Besim Šerbečić
27	MF	CRO	Dario Čanađija
29	FW	NOR	Bjørn Martin Kristensen
30	DF	DEN	Alexander Juel Andersen
33	DF	NOR	Simen Rafn
37	DF	NOR	Henrik Molvær Melland

=== Out on loan ===
Note: Flags indicate national team as defined under FIFA eligibility rules; some limited exceptions apply. Players may hold more than one non-FIFA nationality.

No.	Pos.	Nation	Player
17	FW	SEN	Mamadou Diaw (at Bryne)
21	MF	NOR	Markus Karlsbakk (at Raufoss)
26	GK	NOR	Tor Erik Valderhaug Larsen (at Stjørdals-Blink)

No.	Pos.	Nation	Player
32	MF	NOR	Kristoffer Strand Ødven (at Hødd)
34	DF	NOR	Stian Aarønes Holte (at Brattvåg)

== Transfers ==
=== Winter ===
In: Note: Flags indicate national team as defined under FIFA eligibility rules; some limited exceptions apply. Players may hold more than one non-FIFA nationality.

No.	Pos.	Nation	Player
1	GK	NOR	Sten Grytebust (from (Denmark) Copenhagen)
2	DF	SRB	Petar Golubović (free agent)
3	DF	NOR	Jeppe Moe (from Stabæk)
8	MF	NOR	Fredrik Haugen (from Stabæk)
9	FW	DEN	Alexander Ammitzbøll (from (Denmark) AGF)
25	DF	BIH	Besim Šerbečić (from Rosenborg)
26	GK	NOR	Tor Erik Larsen (from (United States) Purdue Fort Wayne Mastodons)
27	MF	CRO	Dario Čanađija (from Sarpsborg 08)
30	DF	DEN	Alexander Juel Andersen (on loan from (Denmark) OB)
36	DF	NOR	Christian Mork Breivik (promoted from junior squad)

Out: Note: Flags indicate national team as defined under FIFA eligibility rules; some limited exceptions apply. Players may hold more than one non-FIFA nationality.

No.	Pos.	Nation	Player
1	GK	NOR	Andreas Lie (retired)
3	DF	NED	Quint Jansen (to Sandefjord)
4	DF	NOR	Jonas Grønner (to Langevåg)
8	MF	NOR	Fredrik Carlsen (retired)
9	FW	CHI	Niklas Castro (to Brann)
10	FW	DEN	Muamer Brajanac (loan return to (Denmark) Horsens)
18	DF	ISL	Davíð Kristján Ólafsson (to (Sweden) Kalmar)
24	GK	NOR	Enock Mawete Mwimba (to Øygarden)
28	DF	NOR	Håvard Mork Breivik (to Brattvåg)
32	MF	NOR	Kristoffer Strand Ødven (on loan to Hødd)

=== Summer ===
In: Note: Flags indicate national team as defined under FIFA eligibility rules; some limited exceptions apply. Players may hold more than one non-FIFA nationality.

No.	Pos.	Nation	Player
16	DF	NOR	John Kitolano (from Odd)
18	DF	NOR	Nikolai Hopland (loan return from Kristiansund)
21	FW	NGA	Moses Ebiye (from Tromsø)
23	FW	GHA	Gilbert Koomson (on loan from Bodø/Glimt)
29	FW	NOR	Bjørn Martin Kristensen (from Grorud)
30	DF	DEN	Alexander Juel Andersen (from (Denmark) OB, previously on loan)
39	FW	NOR	Andreas Televik (from Hødd)

Out: Note: Flags indicate national team as defined under FIFA eligibility rules; some limited exceptions apply. Players may hold more than one non-FIFA nationality.

No.	Pos.	Nation	Player
16	DF	NOR	Jørgen Hatlehol (to Bryne)
17	FW	SEN	Mamadou Diaw (on loan to Bryne)
18	DF	NOR	Nikolai Hopland (on loan to Kristiansund)
19	MF	NOR	Isak Dybvik Määttä (to (Netherlands) Groningen)
22	FW	NOR	Sigurd Hauso Haugen (to (Denmark) AGF)
26	GK	NOR	Tor Erik Valderhaug Larsen (on loan to Stjørdals-Blink)
34	DF	NOR	Stian Aarønes Holte (on loan to Brattvåg)
39	FW	NOR	Andreas Televik (to Hødd)

== Competitions ==
=== Eliteserien ===
==== Results summary ====
Overall								Home						Away					
Pld	W	D	L	GF	GA	GD	Pts	W	D	L	GF	GA	GD	W	D	L	GF	GA	GD
30	10	9	11	32	45	−13	39	6	5	4	17	17	0	4	4	7	15	28	−13

Last updated: 13 November 2022.

==== Results by round ====
Round	1	2	3	4	5	6	7	8	9	10	11	12	13	14	15	16	17	18	19	20	21	22	23	24	25	26	27	28	29	30
Ground	H	A	H	A	A	H	A	H	A	H	A	H	A	H	A	H	A	H	A	H	A	H	A	H	A	H	H	A	H	A
Result	W	L	D	W	D	L	W	W	D	D	L	H	D	D	L	L	L	L	L	D	W	L	L	W	W	D	W	L	W	D
Position	3	10	10	6	6	9	6	4	5	6	9	5	6	6	7	7	10	11	11	12	11	12	12	12	11	12	9	10	9	9

A = Away; H = Home; W = Win; D = Draw; L = Loss

==== Results ====
3 April 2022 1	Aalesund	1–0	Kristiansund	Ålesund
18:00 CEST (UTC+2)	Barmen 52'	Report		Stadium: Color Line Stadion; Attendance: 5,246; Referee: Ola Hobber Nilsen

10 April 2022 2	Viking	1–0	Aalesund	Stavanger
20:00 CEST (UTC+2)	Tripić 71'	Report		Stadium: Viking Stadion; Attendance: 8,832; Referee: Espen Eskås

18 April 2022 3	Aalesund	2–2	Tromsø	Ålesund
18:00 CEST (UTC+2)	Haugen 18', 69'	Report	Øyvann 51'; Gundersen 90+5'	Stadium: Color Line Stadion; Attendance: 5,191; Referee: Marius Lien

23 April 2022 4	Odd	2–3	Aalesund	Skien
16:00 CEST (UTC+2)	Lauritsen 50', 65'	Report	Haugen 14'; Määttä 34'; Ødemarksbakken 55'	Stadium: Skagerak Arena; Attendance: 4,893; Referee: Daniel Higraff

28 April 2022 15	Lillestrøm	2–0	Aalesund	Lillestrøm
20:00 CEST (UTC+2)	Pettersson 9'; Ibrahimaj 33'	Report		Stadium: Åråsen Stadion; Attendance: 4,567; Referee: Sivert Øksnes Amland

8 May 2022 5	HamKam	0–0	Aalesund	Hamar
20:00 CEST (UTC+2)		Report		Stadium: Briskeby Stadion; Attendance: 3,037; Referee: Kai Erik Steen

16 May 2022 6	Aalesund	0–2	Molde	Ålesund
18:00 CEST (UTC+2)		Report	Eikrem 2'; Zekhnini 43'	Stadium: Color Line Stadion; Attendance: 10,778; Referee: Mohammad Usman Aslam

22 May 2022 7	Sarpsborg 08	1–2	Aalesund	Sarpsborg
18:00 CEST (UTC+2)	Molins 13'	Report	Haugen 34', 90+2'	Stadium: Sarpsborg stadion Attendance: 4,158; Referee: Rohit Saggi

25 May 2022 8	Aalesund	2–1	Jerv	Ålesund
18:00 CEST (UTC+2)	Nordli 78'; Määttä 80'	Report	Brenden 65'	Stadium: Color Line Stadion; Attendance: 4,429; Referee: Daniel Higraff

29 May 2022 9	Haugesund	2–2	Aalesund	Haugesund
18:00 CEST (UTC+2)	Therkildsen 31'; Ndour 69'	Report	Määttä 19'; Solnørdal 86'	Stadium: Haugesund Stadion; Attendance: 3,238; Referee: Sivert Øksnes Amland

19 June 2022 10	Aalesund	2–2	Vålerenga	Ålesund
20:00 CEST (UTC+2)	Hauso Haugen 37'; Kallevåg 67'	Report	Eng 82'; Näsberg 85'	Stadium: Color Line Stadion; Attendance: 6,761; Referee: Kristoffer Hagenes

26 June 2022 11	Bodø/Glimt	2–0	Aalesund	Bodø
18:00 CEST (UTC+2)	Pellegrino 76'; Wembangomo 89'	Report		Stadium: Aspmyra Stadion; Attendance: 5,126; Referee: Marius Lien

3 July 2022 12	Aalesund	1–0	Strømsgodset	Ålesund
18:00 CEST (UTC+2)	Haugen 52'	Report		Stadium: Color Line Stadion; Attendance: 4,701; Referee: Marius Hansen Grøtta

10 July 2022 13	Sandefjord	2–2	Aalesund	Sandefjord
18:00 CEST (UTC+1)	Haakenstad 4'; Ofkir 65'	Report	Nenass 39'; Čanađija 49'	Stadium: Release Arena; Attendance: 2,643; Referee: Ola Hobber Nilsen

17 July 2022 14	Aalesund	0–0	Rosenborg	Ålesund
20:00 CEST		Report		Stadium: Color Line Stadion; Attendance: 6,154; Referee: Svein Tore Sinnes

30 July 2022 16	Aalesund	1–2	Bodø/Glimt	Ålesund
16:00 CEST (UTC+2)	Ødemarksbakken 32'	Report	Boniface 26', 42'	Stadium: Color Line Stadion; Attendance: 4,725; Referee: Kai Erik Steen

7 August 2022 17	Vålerenga	4–0	Aalesund	Oslo
20:00 CEST (UTC+2)	Holm 60'; Sahraoui 62'; Udahl 70'; Jatta 90+1'	Report		Stadium: Intility Arena; Attendance: 7,845; Referee: Rohit Saggi

13 August 2022 18	Aalesund	1–2	Haugesund	Ålesund
16:00 CEST (UTC+2)	Barmen 83'	Report	Ndour 81'; Njie 90+1'	Stadium: Color Line Stadion; Attendance: 4,272; Referee: Sivert Øksnes Amland

21 August 2022 19	Rosenborg	2–1	Aalesund	Trondheim
20:00 CEST (UTC+2)	Sæter 40' (pen.); Tengstedt 90+1'	Report	Nordli 30'	Stadium: Lerkendal Stadion; Attendance: 9,764; Referee: Svein Oddvar Moen

28 August 2022 20	Aalesund	1–1	Odd	Ålesund
18:00 CEST (UTC+2)	Ebiye 32'	Report	Jevtović 36'	Stadium: Color Line Stadion; Attendance: 4,777; Referee: Mohammad Usman Aslam

4 September 2022 21	Strømsgodset	1–2	Aalesund	Drammen
18:00 CEST (UTC+2)	Valsvik 61'	Report	Ebiye 26', 45+2'	Stadium: Marienlyst Stadion; Attendance: 4,602; Referee: Svein Tore Sinnes

11 September 2022 22	Aalesund	1–3	Sarpsborg 08	Ålesund
18:00 CEST (UTC+2)	Ebiye 74'	Report	Maigaard 24'; Golubović 44' (o.g.); Tibbling 56'	Stadium: Color Line Stadion; Attendance: 4,933; Referee: Marius Hansen Grøtta

18 September 2022 23	Molde	3–0	Aalesund	Molde
20:00 CEST (UTC+2)	Brynhildsen 23'; Kaasa 84'; Eriksen 87'	Report		Stadium: Aker Stadion; Attendance: 6,251; Referee: Ola Hobber Nilsen

2 October 2022 24	Aalesund	2–1	Viking	Ålesund
17:00 CEST (UTC+2)	Rafn 61'; Golubović 72'	Report	Tripić 56' (pen.)	Stadium: Color Line Stadion; Attendance: 4,729; Referee: Mohammad Usman Aslam

16 October 2022 26	Aalesund	0–0	HamKam	Ålesund
17:00 CEST (UTC+2)		Report		Stadium: Color Line Stadion; Attendance: 4,392; Referee: Christian Moen

19 October 2022 25	Jerv	0–1	Aalesund	Grimstad
18:00 CEST (UTC+2)		Report	Nordli 45'	Stadium: J.J. Ugland Stadion – Levermyr; Attendance: 2,212; Referee: Rohit Saggi

23 October 2022 27	Aalesund	1–0	Sandefjord	Ålesund
17:00 CEST (UTC+2)	Koomson 73'	Report		Stadium: Color Line Stadion; Attendance: 4,194; Referee: Espen Eskås

30 October 2022 28	Kristiansund	4–0	Aalesund	Kristiansund
17:00 CET (UTC+1)	Williamsen 39'; Willumsson 41' (pen.); Hopland 59' (o.g.); Bye 83'	Report		Stadium: Kristiansund Stadion; Attendance: 3,741; Referee: Marius Lien

6 November 2022 29	Aalesund	2–1	Lillestrøm	Ålesund
17:00 CET (UTC+1)	Nenass 10'; Hopland 68'	Report	Adams 23'	Stadium: Color Line Stadion; Attendance: 6,902; Referee: Daniel Higraff

13 November 2022 30	Tromsø	2–2	Aalesund	Tromsø
17:00 CET (UTC+1)	Kamanzi 12'; Mikkelsen 85'	Report	Kallevåg 20'; Ebiye 35'	Stadium: Alfheim Stadion; Attendance: 3,125; Referee: Rohit Saggi

==== Table ====
Pos	Team	Pld	W	D	L	GF	GA	GD	Pts
7	Tromsø	30	10	13	7	46	49	−3	43
8	Sarpsborg 08	30	12	5	13	57	54	+3	41
9	Aalesund	30	10	9	11	32	45	−13	39
10	Haugesund	30	10	8	12	42	46	−4	38
11	Viking	30	9	8	13	48	54	−6	35

Source: Football Association of Norway (in Norwegian)
Rules for classification: 1) Points; 2) Goal difference; 3) Goals scored; 4) Head-to-head points; 5) Head-to-head goal difference; 6) Head-to-head goals scored.

=== Norwegian Football Cup ===
==== 2021–22 ====
The fourth round match against Bodø/Glimt was cancelled because Aalesund did not have enough players available on the new date. Therefore, Bodø/Glimt was advanced to the quarter-finals by a walkover.

==== 2022–23 ====
19 May 2022 First round	Fjøra	0–3	Aalesund	Sogndalsfjøra
18:00 CEST (UTC+2)		Report	Määttä 13'; Diaw 53', 55'	Stadium: Fosshaugane Campus; Attendance: 350; Referee: Torgeir Halsen

22 June 2022 Second round	Hødd	0–3	Aalesund	Ulsteinvik
18:00 CEST (UTC+2)		Report	Čanađija 15'; Haugen 29'; Solnørdal 60'	Stadium: Høddvoll; Attendance: 1,316; Referee: Torgeir Halsen

29 June 2022 Third round	Lillestrøm	1–0	Aalesund	Lillestrøm
18:00 CEST (UTC+2)	Friðjónsson 45+1'	Report		Stadium: Åråsen Stadion; Attendance: 3,953; Referee: Rohit Saggi
