= Travis Hernes =

Norwegian footballer (born 2005)

Personal information
- Full name: Travis Enrique Hernes
- Date of birth: 4 November 2005 (age 21)
- Place of birth: Kingston, Jamaica
- Height: 1.79 m (5 ft 10 in)
- Position: Midfielder

Team information
- Current team: Groningen
- Number: 7

Youth career
- –2022: Shrewsbury Town
- 2023–: Newcastle United

Senior career*
Years	Team	Apps	(Gls)
2022–2023	Shrewsbury Town	2	(0)
2023–2026	Newcastle United	0	(0)
2025	→ AaB (loan)	12	(0)
2025–2026	→ Groningen (loan)	10	(0)
2026–	Groningen	0	(0)

International career^{‡}
2022	Norway U17	2	(0)
2024	Norway U19	4	(0)
2024–	Norway U20	4	(0)
- * Club domestic league appearances and goals as of 19 May 2026 ‡ National team caps and goals as of 9 June 2025

Travis Enrique Hernes (born 4 November 2005) is a professional footballer who plays as a midfielder for Eredivisie club Groningen. Born in Jamaica, he represents Norway at youth level.

== Career ==
Born in Jamaica and raised in Heradsbygd, Norway, he played football in Norway for local club Heradsbygda IL until 2019. He then moved to Wolverhampton, but was not given a chance at Wolverhampton Wanderers after initially going on trial there. In 2022 he made his youth international debut for Norway, playing for Norway U17 against Denmark and Austria.

=== Shrewsbury Town ===
Hernes made his senior debut for Shrewsbury Town on 30 August 2022, scoring Shrewsbury's consolation goal in a 2–1 EFL Trophy defeat to Wolverhampton Wanderers U21 at the New Meadow. On 7 August 2023, he signed his first professional deal with Shrewsbury Town, keeping him at the club until 2026.

=== Newcastle United ===
On 1 September 2023, Hernes signed for Premier League club Newcastle United for an undisclosed fee.

==== Aalborg BK (loan) ====
On 17 January 2025, Hernes joined Danish Superliga club AaB on loan for the remainder of the season. On 30 March 2025, the day after a 0–4 loss home against Viborg FF in the first match of the Relegation round, Hernes was spotted at a nightclub in Aalborg alongside teammates Andres Jasson and Isak Hansen-Aarøen. All three players officially apologised through the club's website, describing the night out as "poor judgment" on their side.

==== Groningen (loan) ====
On 2 September 2025, Hernes moved on loan to Groningen in the Netherlands.

== Personal life ==
He is a younger brother of footballer Trace Murray.

== Career statistics ==
As of match played 5 September 2023

Appearances and goals by club, season and competition
Club	Season	League			FA Cup		EFL Cup		Other		Total	
Club	Season	Division	Apps	Goals	Apps	Goals	Apps	Goals	Apps	Goals	Apps	Goals
Shrewsbury Town	2022–23	League One	0	0	0	0	0	0	3 (Note: Appearance(s) in the EFL Trophy)	1	3	1
Shrewsbury Town	2023–24	League One	2	0	0	0	1	0	0	0	3	0
Shrewsbury Town	Total		2	0	0	0	0	0	3	1	6	1
Newcastle United U21	2023–24	—			—		—		1	0	1	0
Career total			2	0	0	0	1	0	4	1	7	1
