= Isak Dybvik Määttä =

Norwegian footballer (born 2001)

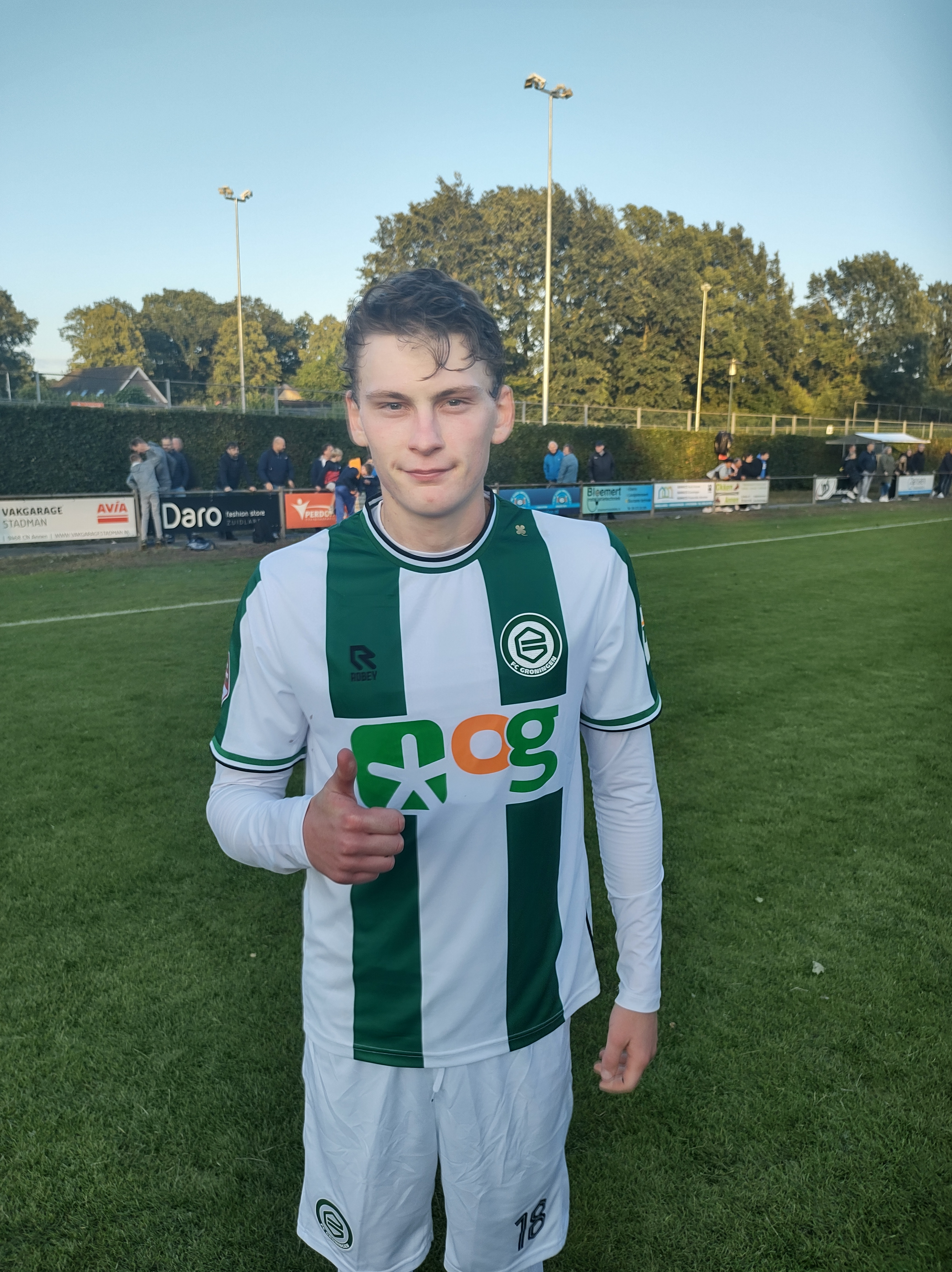
- Määttä with Groningen

Personal information
- Date of birth: 19 September 2001 (age 25)
- Place of birth: Ålesund, Norway
- Height: 1.88 m (6 ft 2 in)
- Positions: Left back; midfielder

Team information
- Current team: Bodø/Glimt
- Number: 25

Youth career
- –2014: Fiskerstrand
- 2014–2016: Langevåg

Senior career*
Years	Team	Apps	(Gls)
2016–2017	Langevåg	13	(5)
2018–2021	Aalesund 2	41	(19)
2019–2022	Aalesund	51	(5)
2022–2024	Groningen	67	(1)
2024–	Bodø/Glimt	66	(2)

International career^{‡}
2019	Norway U18	2	(0)
2021	Norway U20	1	(0)
- * Club domestic league appearances and goals as of 20 November 2026 ‡ National team caps and goals as of 18:04, 25 January 2022 (UTC)

Isak Dybvik Määttä (born 19 September 2001) is a Norwegian professional footballer who plays as a defender or midfielder for Norwegian club Bodø/Glimt.

== Club career ==
Hailing from Sula Municipality, Määttä joined Langevåg at the onset of his teenage years, then regional greats Aalesund in 2018 at the age of 17. The next year he made his league debut for Aalesund and won his first Norway youth caps.

On 28 July 2022, Määttä signed a four-year contract with Eredivisie club Groningen.

On 12 July 2024, Määttä joined Eliteserien club FK Bodø/Glimt. On 8 September 2026, Määttä signed to extend his contract with the club until summer 2030, while his previous deal was due to expire in 2028.

== International career ==
Born in Norway, Määttä is of Finnish descent on his father's side. He is a youth international for Norway, having represented the Norway U18s and U20s.

== Career statistics ==
As of match played 20 November 2026

Appearances and goals by club, season and competition
Club	Season	League			National cup (Note: Includes Norwegian Football Cup, KNVB Cup)		Europe		Total	
Club	Season	Division	Apps	Goals	Apps	Goals	Apps	Goals	Apps	Goals
Langevåg	2016	Norwegian Fourth Division	5	0	0	0	–		5	0
Langevåg	2017	Norwegian Fourth Division	8	5	1	0	–		9	5
Langevåg	Total		13	5	1	0	–		14	5
Aalesund 2	2018	Norwegian Fourth Division	15	7	–		–		15	7
Aalesund 2	2019	Norwegian Third Division	25	10	–		–		25	10
Aalesund 2	2020	Norwegian Third Division	0	0	–		–		0	0
Aalesund 2	2021	Norwegian Third Division	1	2	–		–		1	2
Aalesund 2	Total		41	19	–		–		41	19
Aalesund	2019	Norwegian First Division	1	0	2	0	–		3	0
Aalesund	2020	Eliteserien	12	0	0	0	–		12	0
Aalesund	2021	Norwegian First Division	23	2	3	1	–		26	3
Aalesund	2022	Eliteserien	15	3	2	1	–		17	4
Aalesund	Total		51	5	7	2	–		58	7
Groningen	2022–23	Eredivisie	33	0	1	0	–		34	0
Groningen	2023–24	Eerste Divisie	34	1	4	0	–		38	1
Groningen	Total		67	1	5	0	–		72	1
Bodø/Glimt	2024	Eliteserien	15	0	0	0	21 (Note: Six appearances and two goals in UEFA Champions League, fifteen appearances in UEFA Europa League)	2	36	2
Bodø/Glimt	2025	Eliteserien	24	1	3	1	5 (Note: Five appearances in UEFA Champions League)	0	32	2
Bodø/Glimt	2026	Eliteserien	27	1	6	0	12 (Note: Eleven appearances in UEFA Champions League)	0	45	1
Bodø/Glimt	Total		66	2	9	1	38	2	113	5
Career total			238	32	22	3	38	2	298	37

== Honours ==
Bodø/Glimt

- Eliteserien: 2024
- Norwegian Football Cup: 2025–26
