= Trace Murray =

Norwegian footballer (born 1993)

Personal information
- Full name: Trace Akino Murray
- Date of birth: 31 January 1993 (age 33)
- Place of birth: Jamaica
- Height: 1.74 m (5 ft 9 in)
- Position: Right back

Team information
- Current team: Hønefoss
- Number: 5

Youth career
- 2000–2010: Hønefoss
- 2011–2012: Skeid

Senior career*
Years	Team	Apps	(Gls)
2012	Skeid	4	(0)
2013–2015	Grorud	52	(0)
2016–2017	Hønefoss	46	(6)
2018–2020	Grorud	69	(1)
2021–2022	Kongsvinger	44	(1)
2023	Aalesund	17	(0)
2023	Aalesund II	8	(1)
2024	Hødd	20	(2)
2025–	Hønefoss	30	(1)
- * Club domestic league appearances and goals as of 15 November 2026

Trace Akino Murray (born 31 January 1993) is a Norwegian professional footballer who plays as a right back for Hønefoss.

== Career ==
Born in Jamaica, Murray came to Norway at the age of 5. Settling in Hønefoss, he joined the youth system of Hønefoss BK around the age of 7. His team became local league champions in the U-15 age group. When the time came to attend upper secondary school, Murray chose Oslo. After commuting to Oslo and playing for Hønefoss, he ultimately joined the U20 team of Skeid. He made his senior debut for Skeid in the summer of 2012.

Murray spent his first three senior years in another Oslo-based club, Grorud on the third tier. In 2016 Murray was given the chance to trial for his childhood club Hønefoss, and ended up being signed, incidentally with two of his former U15 teammates.

His breakthrough came after he signed for Grorud again in 2018, and helped the team win promotion from the 2019 2. divisjon and survive the 2020 1. divisjon without being relegated. However, Murray then chose to sign for Kongsvinger in 2021, who had been relegated, but historically was a much larger club than Grorud. He described the team as being more professional, with the team's former back Martin Linnes reaching the national team.

Experiencing success in Kongsvinger, the team was promoted from the 2021 2. divisjon and reached the promotion playoff final of the 2022 1. divisjon. In the winter of 2023, Murray was on trial with Strømsgodset, Hamkam and Aalesund before signing a two-year contract with the latter. He thus made his top-tier debut at the age of 30.

After one season at Aalesund, Murray moved on to Hødd and signed a one-year contract with the club.

== Personal life ==
He is an older brother of Travis Hernes.

== Career statistics ==
As of 15 April 2024

Appearances and goals by club, season and competition
Club	Season	League			National cup		Other		Total	
Club	Season	Division	Apps	Goals	Apps	Goals	Apps	Goals	Apps	Goals
Skeid	2012	2. divisjon	4	0	0	0	—		4	0
Grorud	2013	2. divisjon	22	0	2	0	—		24	0
Grorud	2014	2. divisjon	20	0	2	0	—		22	0
Grorud	2015	2. divisjon	10	0	1	0	—		11	0
Grorud	Total		52	0	5	0	—		57	0
Hønefoss	2016	2. divisjon	23	4	0	0	—		23	4
Hønefoss	2017	2. divisjon	23	2	1	0	—		24	2
Hønefoss	Total		46	6	1	0	—		47	6
Grorud	2018	2. divisjon	25	0	1	0	—		26	0
Grorud	2019	2. divisjon	19	1	2	0	—		21	1
Grorud	2020	1. divisjon	25	0	—		—		25	0
Grorud	Total		69	1	3	0	—		72	1
Kongsvinger	2021	2. divisjon	25	0	3	0	—		28	0
Kongsvinger	2022	1. divisjon	19	1	3	0	4 (Note: Appearances in Eliteserien play-offs)	0	26	1
Kongsvinger	Total		44	1	6	0	4	0	54	1
Aalesund	2023	Eliteserien	17	0	3	0	—		20	0
Hødd	2024	2. divisjon	20	2	2	0	—		22	2
Career total			252	10	20	0	4	0	276	10
