= Markus Karlsbakk =

Norwegian footballer (born 2000)

Personal information
- Full name: Markus Seehusen Karlsbakk
- Date of birth: 7 May 2000 (age 26)
- Place of birth: Ålesund, Norway
- Height: 1.80 m (5 ft 11 in)
- Position: Midfielder

Team information
- Current team: Çorum

Youth career
- –2014: Aksla
- 2014–2019: Aalesund

Senior career*
| Years | Team | Apps | (Gls) |
| 2016–2019 | Aalesund 2 | 64 | (28) |
| 2017–2024 | Aalesund | 62 | (13) |
| 2020 | → Hødd (loan) | 0 | (0) |
| 2021–2022 | → Raufoss (loan) | 61 | (9) |
| 2022 | → Raufoss 2 (loan) | 2 | (4) |
| 2024–2026 | Lillestrøm | 73 | (24) |
| 2026– | Çorum | 0 | (0) |
- * Club domestic league appearances and goals as of 8 August 2026

Markus Seehusen Karlsbakk (born 7 May 2000) is a Norwegian footballer who plays as a midfielder for Çorum in the Turkish Süper Lig.

== Career ==
=== Aalesund ===
Karlsbakk started his career at Aksla, before moving to Aalesund in 2014. He made his debut for Aalesunds on 8 July 2017 in a 3–0 loss against local rival Molde. On 23 November 2018 he signed his first professional contract with Aalesunds. On 14 March 2023 he signed an extension to his current contract which will keep him at Aalesunds until 2025.

Ahead of the 2020 season, Karlsbakk signed with Norwegian Second Division side Hødd. However, because of the COVID-19 pandemic, the league was postponed, and in June, before he had played any games for the club, Karlsbakk was recalled by Aalesund to be a part of their first team squad.

In 2021, Karlsbakk would go out on another loan, this time to Raufoss. Originally the loan only covered the 2021 season, but was eventually extended to apply for the 2022 season too.

=== Lillestrøm ===
In May 2024, Karlsbakk was sold to Lillestrøm, and signed a three-and-a-half year contract with the club. The sale came after Aalesund had received a bid on Karlsbakk by Fredrikstad the previous month, which they had turned down.

=== Çorum ===
On 9 August 2026, Karlsbakk signed a three-year contract with Turkish Süper Lig side Çorum, with an option to extend for another year.

== Career statistics ==
As of 8 August 2026

Appearances and goals by club, season and competition
| Club | Season | League | | | National cup | | Total | |
| Club | Season | Division | Apps | Goals | Apps | Goals | Apps | Goals |
|---|---|---|---|---|---|---|---|---|
| Aalesund 2 | 2016 | 3. divisjon | 6 | 0 | — | | 6 | 0 |
| Aalesund 2 | 2017 | 3. divisjon | 24 | 4 | — | | 24 | 4 |
| Aalesund 2 | 2018 | 4. divisjon | 11 | 5 | — | | 11 | 5 |
| Aalesund 2 | 2019 | 3. divisjon | 23 | 19 | — | | 23 | 19 |
| Aalesund 2 | Total | | 64 | 28 | 0 | 0 | 64 | 28 |
| Aalesund | 2017 | Eliteserien | 1 | 0 | 0 | 0 | 1 | 0 |
| Aalesund | 2018 | 1. divisjon | 1 | 0 | 0 | 0 | 1 | 0 |
| Aalesund | 2019 | 1. divisjon | 0 | 0 | 1 | 0 | 1 | 0 |
| Aalesund | 2020 | Eliteserien | 19 | 2 | — | | 19 | 2 |
| Aalesund | 2023 | Eliteserien | 29 | 5 | 3 | 4 | 32 | 9 |
| Aalesund | 2024 | 1. divisjon | 7 | 2 | 1 | 0 | 8 | 2 |
| Aalesund | Total | | 57 | 9 | 5 | 4 | 62 | 13 |
| Hødd (loan) | 2020 | 2. divisjon | 0 | 0 | — | | 0 | 0 |
| Raufoss (loan) | 2021 | 1. divisjon | 30 | 5 | 3 | 1 | 33 | 6 |
| Raufoss (loan) | 2022 | 1. divisjon | 27 | 3 | 1 | 0 | 28 | 3 |
| Raufoss (loan) | Total | | 57 | 8 | 4 | 1 | 61 | 9 |
| Raufoss 2 (loan) | 2022 | 3. divisjon | 2 | 4 | — | | 2 | 4 |
| Lillestrøm | 2024 | Eliteserien | 16 | 1 | 0 | 0 | 16 | 1 |
| Lillestrøm | 2025 | 1. divisjon | 30 | 13 | 9 | 6 | 39 | 19 |
| Lillestrøm | 2026 | Eliteserien | 15 | 4 | 1 | 0 | 16 | 4 |
| Lillestrøm | Total | | 61 | 18 | 10 | 6 | 71 | 24 |
| Çorum | 2026–27 | Süper Lig | 0 | 0 | — | | 0 | 0 |
| Career total | | | 241 | 67 | 19 | 11 | 260 | 78 |

== Honours ==
Lillestrøm

- Norwegian First Division: 2025
- Norwegian Football Cup: 2025

Individual

- Norwegian First Division Player of the Month: May 2025
- 2025 Norwegian Football Cup final: Man of the match
