= Besim Šerbečić =

Bosnian footballer

Personal information
- Full name: Besim Šerbečić
- Date of birth: 1 May 1998 (age 28)
- Place of birth: Gračanica, Bosnia and Herzegovina
- Height: 1.94 m (6 ft 4 in)
- Position: Centre-back

Team information
- Current team: Kisvárda

Youth career
- Bratstvo Gračanica
- Zvijezda Gradačac

Senior career*
Years	Team	Apps	(Gls)
2015–2016	Zvijezda Gradačac	24	(2)
2016–2018	Radnik Bijeljina	30	(2)
2018–2021	Rosenborg	12	(1)
2019–2020	→ Sarajevo (loan)	29	(2)
2021–2023	Aalesund	26	(0)
2023–2025	Sarajevo	16	(0)
2024	→ Radnički 1923 (loan)	25	(2)
2025–2026	Velež Mostar	32	(1)
2026–	Kisvárda	0	(0)

International career
2014–2015	Bosnia and Herzegovina U17	13	(0)
2016–2017	Bosnia and Herzegovina U19	14	(2)
2017–2020	Bosnia and Herzegovina U21	10	(2)
2022	Bosnia and Herzegovina	1	(0)
- * Club domestic league appearances and goals as of 11 June 2026

Besim Šerbečić (Bosnian pronunciation: [běsim ʃěrbetʃitɕ]; born 1 May 1998) is a Bosnian professional footballer who plays for Nemzeti Bajnokság I club Kisvárda. He also played for the Bosnia and Herzegovina national team.

Šerbečić started his professional career at Zvijezda Gradačac, before joining Radnik Bijeljina in 2016. Two years later, he was transferred to Rosenborg, who loaned him to Sarajevo in 2019. In 2022, he switched to Aalesund.

A former youth international for Bosnia and Herzegovina, Šerbečić made his senior international debut in 2022.

== Club career ==
=== Early career ===
Šerbečić started playing football at his hometown club Bratstvo Gračanica, before joining Zvijezda Gradačac's youth setup. He made his professional debut against Olimpic on 4 April 2015 at the age of 16. On 18 April, he scored his first professional goal against Zrinjski Mostar.

In July 2016, he moved to Radnik Bijeljina.

In January 2018, Šerbečić was transferred to Norwegian outfit Rosenborg.

In July 2019, he was sent on a season-long loan to Sarajevo. In June 2020, his loan was extended for an additional season.

In December 2021, he signed with Aalesund.

== International career ==
Šerbečić represented Bosnia and Herzegovina at all youth levels.

In January 2018, he received his first senior call-up, for friendly games against the United States and Mexico, but had to wait until 26 September 2022 to make his debut in a 2022–23 UEFA Nations League game against Romania.

== Career statistics ==
=== Club ===
As of match played 28 September 2024

Appearances and goals by club, season and competition
Club	Season	League			National cup (Note: Includes Bosnia and Herzegovina Cup, Norwegian Cup, Serbian Cup)		Continental		Other		Total	
Club	Season	Division	Apps	Goals	Apps	Goals	Apps	Goals	Apps	Goals	Apps	Goals
Zvijezda Gradačac	2014–15	Bosnian Premier League	7	1	—		—		—		7	1
Zvijezda Gradačac	2015–16	First League of FBiH	17	1	—		—		—		17	1
Zvijezda Gradačac	Total		24	2	—		—		—		24	2
Radnik Bijeljina	2016–17	Bosnian Premier League	13	0	2	0	—		—		15	0
Radnik Bijeljina	2017–18	Bosnian Premier League	17	2	1	0	—		—		18	2
Radnik Bijeljina	Total		30	2	3	0	—		—		33	2
Rosenborg	2018	Eliteserien	4	0	4	0	4 (Note: Appearance(s) in UEFA Europa League)	1	1 (Note: Appearance(s) in Mesterfinalen)	0	13	1
Rosenborg	2021	Eliteserien	8	1	2	1	0	0	—		10	2
Rosenborg	Total		12	1	6	1	4	1	1	0	23	3
Sarajevo (loan)	2019–20	Bosnian Premier League	20	2	1	0	4 (Note: Two appearances in UEFA Champions League; two appearances in UEFA Europa League)	0	—		25	2
Sarajevo (loan)	2020–21	Bosnian Premier League	9	0	1	0	1	0	—		11	0
Sarajevo (loan)	Total		29	2	2	0	5	0	—		36	2
Aalesund	2022	Eliteserien	26	0	2	0	—		—		28	0
Sarajevo	2022–23	Bosnian Premier League	14	0	0	0	—		—		14	0
Sarajevo	2023–24	Bosnian Premier League	2	0	0	0	1 (Note: Appearance(s) in UEFA Europa Conference League)	0	—		3	0
Sarajevo	Total		16	0	0	0	1	0	—		17	0
Radnički 1923 (loan)	2023–24	Serbian SuperLiga	16	1	1	0	—		—		17	1
Radnički 1923 (loan)	2024–25	Serbian SuperLiga	9	1	0	0	2	0	—		11	1
Radnički 1923 (loan)	Total		25	2	1	0	2	0	—		28	2
Career total			162	9	14	1	12	1	1	0	189	11

=== International ===
As of match played 26 September 2022

Appearances and goals by national team and year
National team	Year	Apps	Goals
Bosnia and Herzegovina
Bosnia and Herzegovina	2022	1	0
Total		1	0

== Honours ==
Rosenborg

- Eliteserien: 2018
- Norwegian Cup: 2018
- Mesterfinalen: 2018

Sarajevo

- Bosnian Premier League: 2019–20
