= Moctar Diop =

Senegalese footballer (born 2005)

Personal information
- Date of birth: 6 January 2005 (age 21)
- Place of birth: Ross Béthio, Senegal
- Height: 1.93 m (6 ft 4 in)
- Position: Striker

Team information
- Current team: Jong Gent
- Number: 33

Youth career
- –2023: Espoirs de Guediewaye

Senior career*
Years	Team	Apps	(Gls)
2023–2024	Aalesund II	16	(2)
2023–2024	Aalesund	22	(3)
2024–2026	Lillestrøm	28	(5)
2025	Lillestrøm II	3	(0)
2026	Gent	3	(0)
2026–	Jong Gent	6	(0)
- * Club domestic league appearances and goals as of 16 August 2026

Moctar Diop (born 6 January 2005) is a Senegalese footballer who plays as a striker for Challenger Pro League side Jong Gent, the reserve team of Gent.

== Career ==
Hailing from Saint-Louis, Senegal, he attended the Espoirs de Guediewaye academy. He was also discovered by Senegal U20 before he travelled to Europe. The Norwegian Eliteserien club Aalesunds FK invited him on trial in March 2023 following a tip within their scouting network. The club was impressed ad almost immediately signed Diop, on a contract ranging throughout 2026. Standing at 1.93 metres, he is a "power forward" with emphasis on speed and physical play.

Diop's two Eliteserien goals for Aalesund both came in large losses; 1–4 and 1–6. (Note: Moctar Diop at the Norwegian Football Federation (in Norwegian)) Aalesund were relegated from the 2023 Eliteserien, and after Kjetil Rekdal took over as manager, Diop was seldomly selected to play. Still, he was considered as a transfer object by Eliteserien clubs, with Molde FK reportedly being interested, along with Lillestrøm SK. Despite Lillestrøm facing possible relegation from the 2024 Eliteserien, they were able to buy Diop on a contract lasting until the end of 2028. According to Diop, he was advised by Akor Adams to choose Lillestrøm.

Diop scored 5 goals in the 2025 Norwegian First Division which Lillestrøm won. He also impressed in the 2025 Norwegian Football Cup. He scored his first hat-trick against Skjetten. In the quarter-final, he scored against KFUM to put Lillestrøm through again.

On 23 January 2026, Diop signed with Belgian club KAA Gent.

== Career statistics ==
As of match played 1 March 2026

Appearances and goals by club, season and competition
Club	Season	League			National cup		Europe		Other		Total	
Club	Season	Division	Apps	Goals	Apps	Goals	Apps	Goals	Apps	Goals	Apps	Goals
Aalesund II	2023	Norwegian Second Division	14	2	—		—		—		14	2
Aalesund II	2024	Norwegian Third Division	2	0	—		—		—		2	0
Aalesund II	Total		16	2	—		—		—		16	2
Aalesund	2023	Eliteserien	15	2	0	0	—		—		15	2
Aalesund	2024	Norwegian First Division	7	1	—		—		—		7	1
Aalesund	Total		22	3	0	0	—		—		22	3
Lillestrøm	2024	Eliteserien	6	0	1	0	—		—		7	0
Lillestrøm	2025	Eliteserien	22	5	10	5	—		—		32	10
Lillestrøm	Total		28	5	11	5	—		—		39	10
Lillestrøm II	2025	Norwegian Third Division	3	0	—		—		—		3	0
Gent	2025–26	Belgian Pro League	3	0	—		—		—		3	0
Career total			72	10	11	5	0	0	0	0	83	15

== Honours ==
Norwegian First Division: 2025
