= Kristoffer Strand Ødven =

Norwegian footballer (born 2002)

Personal information
- Date of birth: 10 February 2002 (age 24)
- Place of birth: Ålesund, Norway
- Height: 1.75 m (5 ft 9 in)
- Position: Midfielder

Youth career
- –2017: Herd

Senior career*
Years	Team	Apps	(Gls)
2017	Herd 2	2	(0)
2018–2023	Aalesund 2	35	(4)
2020–2023	Aalesund	4	(0)
2022	→ Hødd (loan)	25	(3)
2022	→ Hødd 2 (loan)	5	(0)
2024–2025	Lokomotiv Oslo 2	9	(3)
- * Club domestic league appearances and goals as of 14 July 2026

Kristoffer Strand Ødven (born 10 February 2002) is a Norwegian footballer who plays as a midfielder.

== Career ==
Born in Ålesund, Ødven began his career with Herd before moving to professional club Aalesund in 2018. Having made two appearances in the 2020 Eliteserien, he signed a professional contract in January 2021. However, after not featuring often in Aalesund's 2021 campaign due to injury, he joined Hødd on loan in March 2022. His spell in Ulsteinvik got off to a good start, with head coach Joakim Dragsten stating that he was "really exciting" and "a very good player". This good form continued, and in July 2022, with his loan deal set to expire, he signed a new contract with Aalesund, also extending his deal with Hødd until the end of 2022.

On his return to Aalesund, he stated that he was "ready for the battle for playing time" ahead of the 2023 season. However, after only making three appearances in the season, he left the club by mutual consent on 3 August 2023. He would later go on to join Lokomotiv Oslo, featuring solely for the club's reserve team.

== Career statistics ==
=== Club ===
As of 14 July 2026.

Appearances and goals by club, season and competition
Club	Season	League			Cup (Note: Includes NM Cupen)		Other		Total	
Club	Season	Division	Apps	Goals	Apps	Goals	Apps	Goals	Apps	Goals
Herd 2	2017	5. divisjon	2	0	–		0	0	2	0
Aalesund 2	2018	4. divisjon	0	0	–		0	0	0	0
Aalesund 2	2019	3. divisjon	19	1	–		0	0	19	1
Aalesund 2	2020	3. divisjon	0	0	–		0	0	0	0
Aalesund 2	2021	3. divisjon	4	2	–		0	0	4	2
Aalesund 2	2022	3. divisjon	0	0	–		0	0	0	0
Aalesund 2	2023	2. divisjon	12	1	–		0	0	12	1
Aalesund 2	Total		35	4	0	0	0	0	35	4
Aalesund	2020	Eliteserien	2	0	0	0	0	0	2	0
Aalesund	2021	1. divisjon	1	0	2	0	0	0	3	0
Aalesund	2022	Eliteserien	0	0	0	0	0	0	0	0
Aalesund	2023	Eliteserien	1	0	2	0	0	0	3	0
Aalesund	Total		4	0	4	0	0	0	8	0
Hødd (loan)	2022	2. divisjon	25	3	2	0	0	0	27	3
Hødd 2 (loan)	2022	3. divisjon	5	0	–		0	0	5	0
Lokomotiv Oslo 2	2024	4. divisjon	3	0	–		0	0	3	0
Lokomotiv Oslo 2	2025	4. divisjon	6	3	–		0	0	6	3
Lokomotiv Oslo 2	Total		9	3	0	0	0	0	9	3
Career total			2	0	0	0	0	0	2	0
