= Petar Golubović =

Serbian footballer

Personal information
- Date of birth: 13 July 1994 (age 32)
- Place of birth: Belgrade, FR Yugoslavia
- Height: 1.86 m (6 ft 1 in)
- Positions: Centre-back; right-back

Youth career
- –2011: Red Star Belgrade
- 2011–2012: Nike Academy

Senior career*
Years	Team	Apps	(Gls)
2013–2014	OFK Beograd	20	(0)
2014–2017	Roma	0	(0)
2014	→ Novara (loan)	4	(0)
2014–2015	→ Pistoiese (loan)	25	(0)
2015–2017	→ Pisa (loan)	53	(1)
2017–2018	Novara	35	(0)
2018–2021	Kortrijk	56	(0)
2022–2023	Aalesund	25	(1)
2023–2025	Khimki	58	(0)

International career
2013	Serbia U19	6	(0)
2013–2015	Serbia U21	2	(0)
Medal record
Gold medal – first place	UEFA Under-19 Championship	2013
- * Club domestic league appearances and goals as of 24 May 2025

Petar Golubović (Serbian Cyrillic: Петар Голубовић, born 13 July 1994) is a Serbian footballer who plays as a centre-back. He can also play as a right-back.

== Club career ==
=== Early career ===
Golubović, who from an early age was mentored by coach Aleksandar Janković, was a member of Red Star Belgrade's youth selections before he became a 2012 finalist in Nike Football Academy's "The Chance".

=== OFK Beograd ===
Golubović made his debut under coach Zoran Milinković at the age of 18 on April 3, 2013, in a 1–0 away win against Vojvodina.

=== Roma ===
On 31 January 2014, it was announced that Italian Serie A giants Roma completed the €1 million (and a variable fee up to a maximum of €0.5 million) signing of Golubović, who has agreed a four-and-a-half-year contract. He was loaned out to Serie B side Novara on loan for the remainder of the 2013–14 season. On 26 August 2014 he was signed by Pistoiese. On 17 July 2015 Golubović was signed by Pisa.

=== Khimki ===
On 9 February 2023, Golubović signed a 1.5-year contract with Russian Premier League club Khimki.

== International career ==
Golubović played for the Serbia U19 side that won the 2013 UEFA European Under-19 Championship. He made his debut for Serbia U21 on 11 October 2013 in a 2–1 win against Cyprus U21.

== Career statistics ==
As of match played 24 May 2025

Appearances and goals by club, season and competition
Club	Season	League			Cup		Europe		Other		Total	
Club	Season	Division	Apps	Goals	Apps	Goals	Apps	Goals	Apps	Goals	Apps	Goals
OFK Beograd	2012–13	Serbian SuperLiga	8	0	1	0	—		—		9	0
OFK Beograd	2013–14	Serbian SuperLiga	12	0	2	0	—		—		14	0
OFK Beograd	Total		20	0	3	0	0	0	0	0	23	0
Novara (loan)	2013–14	Serie B	4	0	—		—		0	0	4	0
Pistoiese (loan)	2014–15	Serie C	25	0	—		—		—		25	0
Pisa (loan)	2015–16	Serie C	20	1	2	0	—		5 (Note: Appearances in the promotion play-offs)	0	27	1
Pisa (loan)	2016–17	Serie B	33	0	3	0	—		—		36	0
Pisa (loan)	Total		53	1	5	0	0	0	5	0	63	1
Novara	2017–18	Serie B	35	0	—		—		—		35	0
Kortrijk	2018–19	Belgian Pro League	8	0	1	0	—		4 (Note: Appearances in Europa League play-offs)	0	13	0
Kortrijk	2019–20	Belgian Pro League	21	0	3	0	—		—		24	0
Kortrijk	2020–21	Belgian Pro League	27	0	2	0	—		—		29	0
Kortrijk	Total		56	0	6	0	0	0	4	0	66	0
Aalesund	2022	Eliteserien	25	1	1	0	—		—		26	1
Khimki	2022–23	Russian Premier League	12	0	0	0	—		—		12	0
Khimki	2023–24	Russian First League	30	0	2	0	—		—		32	0
Khimki	2024–25	Russian Premier League	16	0	5	0	—		—		21	0
Khimki	Total		58	0	7	0	0	0	0	0	65	0
Career total			276	2	22	0	0	0	9	0	307	2
