= Torbjørn Kallevåg =

Norwegian footballer (born 1993)

Personal information
- Date of birth: 21 August 1993 (age 33)
- Position: Midfielder

Team information
- Current team: Hødd
- Number: 8

Senior career*
| Years | Team | Apps | (Gls) |
| 2010–2011 | Bremnes | 6 | (0) |
| 2012–2014 | Vard Haugesund | 47 | (16) |
| 2015–2017 | Hødd | 79 | (18) |
| 2018–2020 | Haugesund | 47 | (3) |
| 2020 | Lillestrøm | 24 | (5) |
| 2021–2022 | Aalesund | 56 | (5) |
| 2023– | Hødd | 112 | (7) |
- * Club domestic league appearances and goals as of 14 November 2026

Torbjørn Kallevåg (born 21 August 1993) is a Norwegian professional footballer who plays for Hødd, as a midfielder.

== Career ==
On 28 May 2020 Kallevåg signed a contract with Lillestrøm.

In December 2022 it was announced he would return to Hødd for the 2023 season.

== Career statistics ==
As of match played 14 June 2025

Appearances and goals by club, season and competition
| Club | Season | League | | | National Cup | | Europe | | Total | |
| Club | Season | Division | Apps | Goals | Apps | Goals | Apps | Goals | Apps | Goals |
|---|---|---|---|---|---|---|---|---|---|---|
| Bremnes | 2010 | 4. divisjon | 3 | 0 | 0 | 0 | – | | 3 | 0 |
| Bremnes | 2011 | 4. divisjon | 3 | 0 | 0 | 0 | – | | 3 | 0 |
| Bremnes | Total | | 6 | 0 | 0 | 0 | 0 | 0 | 6 | 0 |
| Vard Haugesund | 2012 | 2. divisjon | 9 | 0 | 1 | 0 | – | | 10 | 0 |
| Vard Haugesund | 2013 | 1. divisjon | 14 | 1 | 2 | 0 | – | | 16 | 1 |
| Vard Haugesund | 2014 | 2. divisjon | 24 | 15 | 2 | 0 | – | | 26 | 15 |
| Vard Haugesund | Total | | 47 | 16 | 5 | 0 | 0 | 0 | 52 | 16 |
| Hødd | 2015 | 1. divisjon | 30 | 3 | 4 | 2 | – | | 34 | 5 |
| Hødd | 2016 | 1. divisjon | 28 | 3 | 2 | 0 | – | | 30 | 3 |
| Hødd | 2017 | 2. divisjon | 21 | 12 | 2 | 1 | – | | 23 | 13 |
| Hødd | Total | | 79 | 18 | 8 | 3 | 0 | 0 | 87 | 21 |
| Haugesund | 2018 | Eliteserien | 26 | 2 | 4 | 0 | - | | 30 | 2 |
| Haugesund | 2019 | Eliteserien | 21 | 1 | 5 | 2 | 2 | 0 | 28 | 3 |
| Haugesund | Total | | 47 | 3 | 9 | 2 | 2 | 0 | 58 | 5 |
| Lillestrøm | 2020 | 1. divisjon | 24 | 5 | – | | – | | 24 | 5 |
| Aalesund | 2021 | 1. divisjon | 28 | 3 | 3 | 0 | – | | 31 | 3 |
| Aalesund | 2022 | Eliteserien | 26 | 2 | 3 | 0 | – | | 29 | 2 |
| Aalesund | Total | | 54 | 5 | 6 | 0 | 0 | 0 | 60 | 5 |
| Hødd | 2023 | 1. divisjon | 29 | 2 | 1 | 0 | – | | 30 | 2 |
| Hødd | 2024 | 2. divisjon | 25 | 3 | 3 | 1 | – | | 28 | 4 |
| Hødd | 2025 | 1. divisjon | 10 | 1 | 2 | 1 | – | | 12 | 2 |
| Hødd | Total | | 64 | 6 | 6 | 2 | 0 | 0 | 70 | 8 |
| Career total | | | 321 | 53 | 34 | 7 | 2 | 0 | 357 | 60 |
