= Nenass =

Cape Verdean footballer

Personal information
- Full name: Erikson Spinola Lima
- Date of birth: 5 July 1995 (age 31)
- Place of birth: Cape Verde
- Height: 1.70 m (5 ft 7 in)

Senior career*
Years	Team	Apps	(Gls)
- Mindelense
2016	Vålerenga 2	6	(0)
2016–2017	KFUM Oslo	24	(1)
2017–2018	Sarpsborg	1	(0)
2017	→ Sarpsborg 2	10	(1)
2018–2022	AaFK	111	(2)
2019	→ AaFK 2	5	(1)

International career^{‡}
2021–	Cape Verde	4	(0)
- * Club domestic league appearances and goals as of 14 November 2022 ‡ National team caps and goals as of 4 July 2026

Erikson Spinola Lima (born 5 July 1995), better known as Nenass, is a Cape Verdean footballer who plays as a midfielder.

== Career ==
In 2014, Nenass trialed for MFF, Sweden's most successful club.

Before the 2016 season, he signed for Vålerenga 2 in the Norwegian third division.

In 2016, he signed for Norwegian second division side KFUM Oslo.

In 2017, Nenass signed for Sarpsborg in the Norwegian top flight, where he made 1 league appearance. On 17 September 2017, he debuted for Sarpsborg during a 0-5 loss to TIL.

Before the 2018 season, he signed for Norwegian second division team AaFK, helping them achieve promotion to the Norwegian top flight.

== International career ==
Nenass debuted with the Cape Verde national team in a 2–1 2022 FIFA World Cup qualification win over Liberia on 7 October 2021.
