= Oscar Solnørdal =

Norwegian footballer (born 2002)

Personal information
- Date of birth: 23 October 2002 (age 24)
- Place of birth: Ålesund, Norway
- Height: 1.85 m (6 ft 1 in)
- Positions: Defensive midfielder; central midfielder

Team information
- Current team: Stabæk
- Number: 7

Youth career
- –2017: Aalesund
- 2017–2018: Herd
- 2018–2020: Rosenborg

Senior career*
Years	Team	Apps	(Gls)
2018	Herd	3	(0)
2021–2023	Aalesund	9	(1)
2023	→ Kongsvinger (loan)	7	(0)
2024–2025	Brattvåg	48	(7)
2026–	Stabæk	8	(0)
- * Club domestic league appearances and goals as of 22 May 2026

Oscar Solnørdal (born 23 October 2002) is a Norwegian footballer who plays as a central midfielder for Stabæk.

== Career ==
He played youth football for Aalesunds FK and SK Herd. Instead of returning to the largest team in the city, Aalesund, Solnørdal joined the academy of reigning league champions Rosenborg BK. Here, his development led to a contract offer that would place Solnørdal in Rosenborg's first-team squad, but instead he chose to sign for Aalesund until the end of 2023.

He started friendly matches, and his first league goal that came in May 2022 secured an important point versus Haugesund. However, he seldomly got the chance at Aalesund, and in 2023 he was loaned to Kongsvinger to be used as a wing-back. At the start of 2024 he moved down to the Second Division with Brattvåg IL.

With Solnørdal serving as team captain of Brattvåg, the team reached the playoffs to the First Division. Amid interest from other clubs in several Brattvåg players, Solnørdal was picked up by First Division team Stabæk.

== Personal life ==
He is a younger brother of Aalesund, Brattvåg and Hødd player Emil Solnørdal.
