= 2025 Sandefjord Fotball season =

Sandefjord
2025 season
- Chairman: Gunnar Bjønness
- Head coach: Andreas Tegström
- Stadium: Jotun Arena
- Eliteserien: 5th
- 2025 Norwegian Cup: Third round
- 2025–26 Norwegian Cup: Third round
Home colours	Away colours
- All statistics correct as of 9 December 2025.

The 2025 season was the 27th season in the history of Sandefjord Fotball and their sixth consecutive season in the top flight of Norwegian football. The club ended up with their best ever position in the Eliteserien, finishing at 5th place. They got knocked out of the 2025 Cup against Sarpsborg 08 in the third round, and they crashed out in the first round of the newly refurbished 2025-26 Cup.

== Current squad ==
As of 9 December 2025

Note: Flags indicate national team as defined under FIFA eligibility rules; some limited exceptions apply. Players may hold more than one non-FIFA nationality.

No.	Pos.	Nation	Player
1	GK	NOR	Alf Lukas Grønneberg
2	DF	SWE	Zinedin Smajlović
3	DF	NOR	Vetle Walle Egeli
4	DF	NOR	Fredrik Carson Pedersen
5	DF	NOR	Aleksander van der Spa
6	MF	NOR	Sander Risan Mørk
7	FW	BEL	Evangelos Patoulidis
8	MF	SWE	Robin Dzabic
9	FW	NOR	Jacob Hanstad
10	MF	SUI	Loris Mettler
12	GK	BIH	Alem Omerinović
13	GK	FIN	Carljohan Eriksson (on loan from Sarpsborg 08)
14	MF	NOR	Edvard Sundbø Pettersen
15	MF	KOS	Blerton Isufi (on loan from Molde)
17	DF	NOR	Christopher Cheng

No.	Pos.	Nation	Player
18	MF	SWE	Filip Ottosson
19	FW	NOR	Bendik Berntsen
20	MF	NOR	Marcus Melchior
21	MF	NOR	Jakob Swift
22	DF	NOR	Martin Gjone
23	FW	ISL	Stefán Ingi Sigurðarson
24	FW	NOR	Sebastian Holm Mathisen
26	DF	NOR	Filip Loftesnes-Bjune
27	FW	NOR	Jakob Dunsby (captain)
28	DF	NOR	Theodor Agelin
30	GK	SYR	Elias Hadaya (vice-captain)
31	DF	NOR	Henrik Skretteberg
32	MF	NOR	Kristoffer Halvorsen
47	DF	NOR	Stian Kristiansen

=== Out on loan ===
Note: Flags indicate national team as defined under FIFA eligibility rules; some limited exceptions apply. Players may hold more than one non-FIFA nationality.

No. / Pos. / Nation / Player; 25 / FW / NOR / Storm Bugge Pettersen (at Eik Tønsberg until 31 December 2025)	No. / Pos. / Nation / Player; 43 / FW / SWE / Elias Jemal (at Start until 31 December 2025)

== Transfers ==
=== Winter ===
In: Note: Flags indicate national team as defined under FIFA eligibility rules; some limited exceptions apply. Players may hold more than one non-FIFA nationality.

No.	Pos.	Nation	Player
2	DF	SWE	Zinedin Smajlovic (from (Sweden) Sandviken)
7	FW	BEL	Evangelos Patoulidis (from (Finland) Haka)
8	MF	SWE	Robin Dzabic (from (Sweden) Landskrona)
12	GK	BIH	Alem Omerinović (promoted from junior squad)
19	FW	NOR	Bendik Berntsen (promoted from junior squad)
21	MF	NOR	Jakob Swift (promoted from junior squad)
24	FW	NOR	Sebastian Holm Mathisen (loan return from Eik Tønsberg)
30	GK	SYR	Elias Hadaya (from (Sweden) Utsikten)
31	DF	NOR	Henrik Skretteberg (promoted from junior squad)

Out: Note: Flags indicate national team as defined under FIFA eligibility rules; some limited exceptions apply. Players may hold more than one non-FIFA nationality.

No.	Pos.	Nation	Player
1	GK	FIN	Hugo Keto (to (Sweden) Värnamo)
2	DF	NOR	Fredrik Berglie (to KFUM)
7	MF	NOR	Eman Markovic (loan return to (Sweden) IFK Göteborg)
8	MF	SWE	Aleksander Damnjanovic Nilsson (to (Sweden) Halmstad)
9	FW	NOR	Alexander Ruud Tveter (released)
16	FW	NOR	Wally Njie (released)
21	MF	SYR	Simon Amin (to (Serbia) Radnički Niš)
99	DF	GAM	Maudo Jarjué (to (North Macedonia) Struga)

=== Summer ===
In: Note: Flags indicate national team as defined under FIFA eligibility rules; some limited exceptions apply. Players may hold more than one non-FIFA nationality.

No.	Pos.	Nation	Player
5	DF	NOR	Aleksander van der Spa (loan return from Moss)
9	FW	NOR	Jacob Hanstad (from Fredrikstad)
13	GK	FIN	Carljohan Eriksson (on loan from Sarpsborg 08)
15	MF	KOS	Blerton Isufi (on loan from Molde)
28	DF	NOR	Theodor Martin Agelin (loan return from Mjøndalen)

Out: Note: Flags indicate national team as defined under FIFA eligibility rules; some limited exceptions apply. Players may hold more than one non-FIFA nationality.

No.	Pos.	Nation	Player
5	DF	NOR	Aleksander van der Spa (on loan to Moss)
9	FW	SWE	Darrell Tibell (released)
25	FW	NOR	Storm Bugge Pettersen (on loan to Eik Tønsberg)
28	DF	NOR	Theodor Martin Agelin (on loan to Mjøndalen)
43	FW	SWE	Elias Jemal (on loan to Start)
45	FW	BDI	Beltran Mvuka (to Sotra)

== Friendlies ==
=== Pre-season ===
18 January 2025 Friendly	Sandefjord (Norway)	8–1	(Norway) Arendal	Sandefjord
14:00	Gjone 24'; Loftesnes-Bjune 28'; Swift 47', 64'; Walle Egeli 56'; Sigurðarson 81'; Jemal 87'; van der Spa 90'	Report	Victorio 18'	Stadium: Jotun Arena

25 January 2025 Friendly	Sandefjord (Norway)	3–3	(Norway) Eik Tønsberg
13:00		Report

31 January 2025 Friendly	Sandefjord (Norway)	5–2	(Norway) Moss
13:00

7 February 2025 Friendly	IF Elfsborg (Sweden)	2–1	(Norway) Fredrikstad
17:00

15 February 2025 Friendly	Sandefjord (Norway)	2–2	(Norway) Fredrikstad	Sandefjord
14:00	Elias Jemal 17'; Darrell Tibell 43'	Report	Stian Stray Molde 21'; Benjamin Faraas 67'	Stadium: Jotun Arena

22 February 2025 Friendly	Stabæk (Norway)	2–4	(Norway) Sandefjord	Spain
15:00		Report

27 February 2025 Friendly	Stabæk (Norway)	1–3	(Norway) Sandefjord	Spain
15:00		Report

15 March 2025 Friendly	Sandefjord (Norway)	1–0	(Norway) KFUM
13:00

23 March 2025 Friendly	Odd (Norway)	0–2	(Norway) Sandefjord
15:00

== Competitions ==
=== Overview ===
Competition	First match	Last match	Starting round	Record							
Competition	First match	Last match	Starting round	Pld	W	D	L	GF	GA	GD	Win %
Eliteserien	30 March 2025	30 November 2025	Matchday 1	3	1	0	2	5	6	−1	33.33
Norwegian Football Cup	13 April 2025		First round	1	1	0	0	5	0	+5	100.00
Total				4	2	0	2	10	6	+4	50.00

Last updated: 21 April 2025
Source: Competitions

=== Eliteserien ===
==== League table ====
Pos	Team	Pld	W	D	L	GF	GA	GD	Pts	Qualification or relegation
3	Tromsø	30	18	3	9	50	36	+14	57	Qualification for the Europa League second qualifying round (Note: Lillestrøm from the 2025 Norwegian First Division qualified for the Europa League play-off round as winners of the 2025 Norwegian Football Cup.)
4	Brann	30	17	5	8	55	46	+9	56	Qualification for the Conference League second qualifying round
5	Sandefjord	30	15	3	12	55	42	+13	48	
6	Vålerenga	30	13	4	13	49	50	−1	43	
7	Rosenborg	30	11	9	10	45	42	+3	42	

Source: Football Association of Norway (in Norwegian)
Rules for classification: 1) Points; 2) Goal difference; 3) Goals scored; 4) Head-to-head points; 5) Head-to-head goal difference; 6) Head-to-head goals scored.

==== Results summary ====
Overall								Home						Away					
Pld	W	D	L	GF	GA	GD	Pts	W	D	L	GF	GA	GD	W	D	L	GF	GA	GD
30	15	3	12	55	42	+13	48	11	1	3	31	12	+19	4	2	9	24	30	−6

Last updated: 30 November 2025.
Source: worldfootball

==== Results by round ====
Round	1	2	3	4	5	6	7	8	9	10
Ground	A	H	A	H	A	H	A	H	A	H
Result	L	W	L	W	W	W	L	W	L	W
Position	13	7	11	9	4	4	7	5	6	5

Updated to match(es) played on 22 June 2025. Source:
A = Away; H = Home; W = Win; D = Draw; L = Loss

==== Matches ====
The match schedule was announced on 20 December 2024.

30 March 2025 1	KFUM	3–1	Sandefjord	Oslo
17:00 UTC+1	Nuñez 45+2'; Hestnes 63'; Njie 77'		Risan Mørk 43'	Stadium: KFUM Arena; Attendance: 1,806; Referee: Christian Moen

6 April 2025 2	Sandefjord	3–0	Molde	Sandefjord
17:00 UTC+2	Ingi Sigurðarson 23', 41'; Jemal 80'			Stadium: Jotun Arena; Attendance: 4,640; Referee: Kristoffer Hagenes

21 April 2025 3	Fredrikstad	3–1	Sandefjord	Fredrikstad
17:00

27 April 2025 4	Sandefjord	2–0	HamKam	Sandefjord
18:00	Smajlović 23'; Sigurðarson 47'	Report	Strand-Nilsen (yellow card) 79'	Stadium: Jotun Arena; Attendance: 3,408; Referee: (Norway) Marius Lien

4 May 2025 5	Tromsø	0–1	Sandefjord	Tromsø
17:00

11 May 2025 6	Sandefjord	2–1	Vålerenga	Sandefjord
17:00	Sigurðarson 34'; Melchior 76'	Report	Ambina 39'	Stadium: Jotun Arena; Attendance: 6011; Referee: Mathias Støfringshaug

16 May 2025 7	Viking	3–1	Sandefjord	Stavanger
19:00	Christiansen 46'; Bærtelsen (yellow card) 57'; Tripić 79' 90+3'	Report	Mettler (yellow card) 30'; Dunsby 59'; Marcus Melchior (yellow card) 68'; Hadaya (yellow card) 75'; Sigurðarson (red card) 90+1'	Stadium: Viking Stadion; Attendance: 15,900; Referee: (Norway) Svein Sinnes

25 May 2025 8	Sandefjord	3–2	Strømsgodset	Sandefjord
18:00	Patoulidis 17'; Tibell 45+1' (yellow card) 63'; Dunsby 49'; Mørk (yellow card) 68'	Report	Stengel 52'; Therkelsen 61'	Stadium: Jotun Arena; Attendance: 3,478; Referee: (Norway) Stian Sletner

1 June 2025 9	Bryne	3–2	Sandefjord	Bryne
18:00	Görlich (yellow card) 23'; Scriven 24' (yellow card) 90+6'; Bojadzic 45+1'; Eirik Franke Saunes 72'	Report	Cheng 68' 90+2'	Stadium: Bryne Stadion; Attendance: 2,440; Referee: (Norway) Eivind Bodding

22 June 2025 10	Sandefjord	4–0	Haugesund	Sandefjord
18:00	Patoulidis 8'; Cheng 58' 85'; Fischer 64' (o.g.); Tibell (yellow card) 83'	Report		Stadium: Jotun Arena; Attendance: 3,803; Referee: (Norway) Rohit Saggi

=== Norwegian Football Cup ===
13 April 2025 First round	Teie IF	0–5	Sandefjord
16:00

24 April 2025 Second round	Ørn Horten	0–2	Sandefjord	Horten
18:00		Report	Mettler 48'; Jemal 90+3'	Stadium: Lystlunden; Attendance: 564; Referee: Ole-Alexander Ekeli Valen

7 May 2025 Third round	Sarpsborg 08	3–1	Sandefjord	Sarpsborg
18:00	Guðjohnsen 4' 49'; Sanyang 13'	Report	Egeli 89'	Stadium: Sarpsborg Stadion; Attendance: 1,393; Referee: Sivert Amland
