= 2024 Sandefjord Fotball season =

Sandefjord
2024 season
- Chairman: Gunnar Bjønness
- Head coaches: Hans Erik Ødegaard; Andreas Tegström
- Stadium: Jotun Arena
- Eliteserien: 10th
- Norwegian Cup: First round
- Top goalscorer: Loris Mettler (7)
Home colours	Away colours

The 2024 season was Sandefjord Fotball's 26th season in existence and the club's fifth consecutive season in the top flight of Norwegian football. In addition to the domestic league, Sandefjord Fotball participated in this season's edition of the Norwegian Football Cup.

== Players ==
=== First team squad ===
As of 31 March 2024

Note: Flags indicate national team as defined under FIFA eligibility rules; some limited exceptions apply. Players may hold more than one non-FIFA nationality.

No.	Pos.	Nation	Player
1	GK	FIN	Hugo Keto
2	DF	NOR	Fredrik Berglie
3	DF	NOR	Vetle Walle Egeli
4	DF	NOR	Fredrik Carson Pedersen
5	DF	NOR	Aleksander van der Spa
6	MF	NOR	Sander Risan Mørk
7	FW	NOR	Eman Markovic (on loan from IFK Göteborg)
8	MF	SWE	Aleksander Damnjanovic Nilsson
9	FW	NOR	Alexander Ruud Tveter
10	MF	SUI	Loris Mettler
11	FW	SWE	Darrell Tibell
14	MF	NOR	Edvard Sundbø Pettersen
16	FW	NOR	Wally Njie
17	DF	NOR	Christopher Cheng
18	MF	SWE	Filip Ottosson

No.	Pos.	Nation	Player
20	MF	NOR	Marcus Melchior
21	MF	SYR	Simon Amin
22	DF	NOR	Martin Gjone
23	FW	ISL	Stefán Ingi Sigurðarson
25	FW	NOR	Storm Bugge Pettersen
26	DF	NOR	Filip Loftesnes-Bjune
27	FW	NOR	Jakob Dunsby
28	DF	NOR	Theodor Agelin
29	FW	NOR	Storm Bugge Pettersen
30	GK	NOR	Alf Lukas Noel Grønneberg
43	FW	SWE	Elias Jemal
45	FW	NOR	Beltran Mvuka
47	DF	NOR	Stian Kristiansen
99	DF	GAM	Maudo Jarjué

=== Out on loan ===
Note: Flags indicate national team as defined under FIFA eligibility rules; some limited exceptions apply. Players may hold more than one non-FIFA nationality.

No.	Pos.	Nation	Player

== Transfers ==
=== Winter ===
In: Note: Flags indicate national team as defined under FIFA eligibility rules; some limited exceptions apply. Players may hold more than one non-FIFA nationality.

No.	Pos.	Nation	Player
5	DF	NOR	Andreas van der Spa (from Sogndal)
20	DF	NOR	Marcus Melchior (from Skeid)
99	DF	GAM	Maudo Jarjué (from (Sweden) Trelleborg)
7	MF	NOR	Eman Markovic (on loan from (Sweden) IFK Göteborg)
10	MF	SUI	Loris Mettler (from Raufoss)
11	FW	SWE	[[[Darrell Tibell]] (from (Sweden) Norrköping)
16	FW	NOR	Wally Njie (loan return from Ørn Horten)
17	DF	NOR	Christopher Cheng (from Strømmen)
24	MF	NOR	Sebastian Holm Mathisen (promoted from junior squad)
45	FW	NOR	Beltran Mvuka (from Sotra)
47	DF	NOR	Stian Kristiansen (from Bodø/Glimt)

Out: Note: Flags indicate national team as defined under FIFA eligibility rules; some limited exceptions apply. Players may hold more than one non-FIFA nationality.

No.	Pos.	Nation	Player
2	DF	NOR	Fredrik Pålerud (released)
7	FW	GHA	Gilbert Koomson (to (Israel) Hapoel Petah Tikva)
10	FW	DEN	Jeppe Kjær (loan return to Bodø/Glimt)
11	FW	NOR	Youssef Chaib (released)
12	GK	NOR	Mats Viken (released)
13	DF	NOR	Lars Markmanrud (to Jerv, previously on loan at Egersund)
15	DF	NOR	Jesper Taaje (to Strømsgodset)
17	DF	NOR	Sander Moen Foss (to Lillestrøm)
20	FW	NOR	Franklin Nyenetue (released)
22	DF	NOR	Jørgen Kili Fjeldskår (to Fram, previously on loan)
23	MF	RSA	Keanin Ayer (to (Denmark) Næstved)

=== Summer ===
In: Note: Flags indicate national team as defined under FIFA eligibility rules; some limited exceptions apply. Players may hold more than one non-FIFA nationality.

No.	Pos.	Nation	Player
5	DF	NOR	Aleksander van der Spa (from Bodø/Glimt 2)
14	MF	NOR	Edvard Sundbø Pettersen (from (Denmark) Midtjylland)
23	FW	ISL	Stefán Ingi Sigurðarson (from (Belgium) Patro Eisden)
28	DF	NOR	Theodor Agelin (from Grorud)
35	MF	NOR	Petter Aanvik Wingsternæs (promoted from junior squad)
43	FW	SWE	Elias Jemal (from (Sweden) Vasalund)

Out: Note: Flags indicate national team as defined under FIFA eligibility rules; some limited exceptions apply. Players may hold more than one non-FIFA nationality.

No.	Pos.	Nation	Player
5	DF	NOR	Andreas van der Spa (retired)
14	MF	IRQ	Danilo Al-Saed (to (Netherlands) Heerenveen)
24	MF	NOR	Sebastian Holm Mathisen (on loan to Eik Tønsberg)

== Pre-season and friendlies ==
Win Draw Loss Fixtures

27 January 2024 Friendly	Sarpsborg 08 (Norway)	2–0	(Norway) Sandefjord	Sarpsborg
13:00 CEST (UTC+2)	Tibbling 36', 45'	Report		Stadium: Sarpsborg Stadion

3 February 2024 Friendly	Sandefjord (Norway)	2–3	(Norway) Moss	Sandefjord
13:00 CEST (UTC+2)	Dunsby 18'; Tibell 84'	Report	Alexandersson 31'; Jakobsen 37', 49'	Stadium: Gamle stadion

16 February 2024 Friendly	Lillestrøm (Norway)	2–2	(Norway) Sandefjord	Lillestrøm
15:00 CEST (UTC+2)	Seferi 60'; Skogvold 93' (pen.)	Report	Dunsby 20'; Ruud Tveter 73'	Stadium: LSK-Hallen

17 February 2024 Friendly	Sandefjord (Norway)	0–2	(Norway) Raufoss	Sandefjord
14:00 CEST (UTC+2)		Report	Rotihaug 69'; Ampofo 90'	Stadium: Gamle stadion

23 February 2024 Friendly	Sandefjord (Norway)	2–1	(Denmark) Nordsjælland Academy	Alicante, Spain
13:00 CEST (UTC+2)	Mvuka 87'; Tibell 89' (pen.)	Report	Prince Maeli 20'	Stadium: Oliva Nova Sports Center

29 February 2024 Friendly	Sandefjord (Norway)	2–2	(Norway) Ranheim	Alicante, Spain
15:00 CEST (UTC+2)	Risan Mørk 5'; Ruud Tveter 36'	Report	Hou Sæter 43'; Wenaas 49'	Stadium: Oliva Nova Sports Center

8 March 2024 Friendly	Fredrikstad (Norway)	2–0	(Norway) Sandefjord	Fredrikstad
13:00 CEST (UTC+2)	Bjørlo 38'; Rafn 63'	Report		Stadium: Fredrikstad Stadion

19 March 2024 Friendly	Strømsgodset (Norway)	0–3	(Norway) Sandefjord	Drammen
12:00 CEST (UTC+2)		Report	Berglie 3'; Ottosson 56'; Dunsby 77'	Stadium: Marienlyst Stadion

24 March 2024 Friendly	Odd (Norway)	0–2	(Norway) Sandefjord	Skien
14:00 CEST (UTC+2)		Report	Mettler 45+1'; Berglie 67'	Stadium: Skagerak Arena

== Competitions ==
=== Overview ===
Competition	First match	Last match	Starting round	Final position	Record							
Competition	First match	Last match	Starting round	Final position	Pld	W	D	L	GF	GA	GD	Win %
Eliteserien	25 March 2024	1 December 2024	Matchday 1	10th	30	9	7	14	41	46	−5	30.00
2024 Norwegian Cup	10 April 2024		First round	First round	1	0	0	1	0	1	−1	0.00
Total					31	9	7	15	41	47	−6	29.03

Last updated: 1 December 2024
Source: Soccerway

=== Eliteserien ===
==== League table ====
Pos	Team	Pld	W	D	L	GF	GA	GD	Pts
8	KFUM	30	9	10	11	35	36	−1	37
9	Sarpsborg	30	10	7	13	43	55	−12	37
10	Sandefjord	30	9	7	14	41	46	−5	34
11	Kristiansund	30	8	10	12	32	45	−13	34
12	HamKam	30	8	9	13	34	39	−5	33

Source: Football Association of Norway (in Norwegian)
Rules for classification: 1) Points; 2) Goal difference; 3) Goals scored; 4) Head-to-head points; 5) Head-to-head goal difference; 6) Head-to-head goals scored.

==== Results summary ====
Overall								Home						Away					
Pld	W	D	L	GF	GA	GD	Pts	W	D	L	GF	GA	GD	W	D	L	GF	GA	GD
30	9	7	14	41	46	−5	34	7	2	6	23	21	+2	2	5	8	18	25	−7

Last updated: 1 December 2024.

==== Results by round ====
Round	1	2	3	4	5	6	7	8	9	10	11	12	13	14	15	16	17	18	19	20	21	22	23	24	25	26	27	28	29	30
Ground	A	H	A	H	A	H	H	A	H	A	A	H	A	H	A	H	A	H	A	H	A	H	A	H	A	H	A	H	A	H
Result	L	L	D	L	L	W	W	L	L	L	D	L	D	W	L	W	L	D	D	W	D	D	L	L	W	W	L	W	W	L
Position	14	16	16	15	16	14	10	13	15	16	16	16	16	14	15	14	15	16	16	14	14	14	14	14	13	13	13	11	9	10

A = Away; H = Home; W = Win; D = Draw; L = Loss

==== Matches ====
The league fixtures were announced on 20 December 2023.

1 April 2024 1	Rosenborg	2–0	Sandefjord	Trondheim
17:00 CEST (UTC+2)	Selnæs (yellow card) 31'; Henriksen (yellow card) 32'; Sæter 65' (yellow card) 67'; Frederiksen 90+6'	Report	Berglie (yellow card) 55'; Ottosson (yellow card) 58'	Stadium: Lerkendal Stadion; Attendance: 14,605; Referee: Sivert Øksnes Amland

14 April 2024 3	Odd	2–2	Sandefjord	Skien
17:00 CEST (UTC+2)	Bang-Kittilsen 28'; Owusu (yellow card) 57'; Aas 90+7'	Report	Berglie 25' (yellow card) 90+4'; Kristiansen 58'; Nilsson (yellow card) 84'	Stadium: Skagerak Arena; Attendance: 5,389; Referee: Christian Moen

21 April 2024 4	Sandefjord	0–1	Lillestrøm	Sandefjord
17:00 CEST (UTC+2)	Gjone (yellow card) 77'	Report	Olsen 60'; Kitolano (yellow card) 65'	Stadium: Jotun Arena; Attendance: 4,089; Referee: Svein Tore Sinnes

28 April 2024 5	Fredrikstad	1–0	Sandefjord	Fredrikstad
17:00 CEST (UTC+2)	Bjørlo 30'; Kvile (yellow card) 57'	Report	Amin (yellow card) 36'	Stadium: Fredrikstad Stadion; Attendance: 6,669; Referee: Espen Eskås

5 May 2024 6	Sandefjord	3–1	Molde	Sandefjord
17:00 CEST (UTC+2)	Amin 65' (yellow card) 80'; Ødegaard (yellow card) 67'; Mettler (yellow card) 71'; Kristiansen 78'; Nilsson 90+6'	Report	Gulbrandsen (yellow card) 32' (goal) 35'; Haugen (yellow card) 42'	Stadium: Jotun Arena; Attendance: 3,179; Referee: Kristoffer Hagenes

12 May 2024 7	Sandefjord	4–1	Sarpsborg	Sandefjord
17:00 CEST (UTC+2)	Ruud Tveter 2' (pen.), 60'; Dunsby (yellow card) 16'; Ottosson (yellow card) 30'; Al-Saed 73'; Markovic 75'	Report	Uchenna (yellow card) 27'; Wichne (yellow card) 45+4'; Johansen 51' (pen.); Meister (yellow card) 66'	Stadium: Jotun Arena; Attendance: 3,513; Referee: Sigurd Smehus Kringstad

16 May 2024 8	Brann	2–1	Sandefjord	Bergen
18:00 CEST (UTC+2)	Finne 51'; Kornvig (yellow card) 57' (goal) 61'	Report	Nilsson (yellow card) 75'; Markovic (yellow card) 81'; Pedersen (yellow card) 90+1'; Mathisen 90+5'	Stadium: Brann Stadion; Attendance: 16,750; Referee: Rohit Saggi

20 May 2024 9	Sandefjord	0–3	Viking	Sandefjord
17:00 CEST (UTC+2)	Dunsby (yellow card) 41'; Mettler (yellow card) 49'; Kristiansen (yellow card) 59'; Amin (yellow card) 90+1'	Report	Tripić 4'; Salvesen 54'; Haugen (yellow card) 64'; Kvia-Egeskog 70'; Gunnarsson (yellow card) 90+6'	Stadium: Jotun Arena; Attendance: 3,696; Referee: Mathias Støfringshaug

26 May 2024 10	Haugesund	2–1	Sandefjord	Haugesund
17:00 CEST (UTC+2)	Diarra (yellow card) 24'; Eskesen 64' (pen.); Niyukuri 81'; Hope (yellow card) 84'; Nyhammer (yellow card) 86' (yellow-red card) 90+5'	Report	Ruud Tveter 50'; Amin (yellow card) 78'; Egeli (yellow card) 84'	Stadium: Haugesund Sparebank Arena; Attendance: 3,615; Referee: Christian Moen

29 May 2024 19	Bodø/Glimt	1–1	Sandefjord	Bodø
19:00 CEST (UTC+2)	Grønbæk 45+4' (pen.); Høgh (yellow card) 86'	Report	Markovic 35' (yellow card) 65'; Pedersen (yellow card) 84'; Egeli (yellow card) 85'	Stadium: Aspmyra Stadion; Attendance: 5,853; Referee: Mohammad Usman Aslam

2 June 2024 11	KFUM	3–3	Sandefjord	Oslo
17:00 CEST (UTC+2)	Ndiaye 66'; Aleesami 75'; Hestnes 89'	Report	Kristiansen (yellow card) 9' (red card) 36'; Amin 68'; Markovic 73'; Risan Mørk 81'; Cheng (yellow card) 87'	Stadium: KFUM Arena; Attendance: 2,759; Referee: Daniel Higraff

27 June 2024 12	Sandefjord	1–2	HamKam	Sandefjord
19:00 CEST (UTC+2)	Gjone (yellow card) 16'; Ottosson 41'; Cheng (yellow card) 90+7'	Report	Viðar 9'; Udahl 60' (pen.)	Stadium: Jotun Arena; Attendance: 3,241; Referee: Sivert Øksnes Amland

3 July 2024 2	Sandefjord	1–2	Tromsø	Sandefjord
19:00 CEST (UTC+2)	Dunsby (yellow card) 27'; Kristiansen (yellow card) 33'; Markovic 75'; Mettler (yellow card) 76'	Report	Nordås 6'; Romsaas (yellow card) 16' (goal) 37'; Jenssen (yellow card) 18'; Robertsen (yellow card) 80'	Stadium: Jotun Arena; Attendance: 3,301; Referee: Marius Hansen Grøtta

8 July 2024 13	Strømsgodset	1–1	Sandefjord	Drammen
17:00 CEST (UTC+2)	Taaje (yellow card) 30'; Tómasson 42'; Stengel (yellow card) 49'	Report	Mettler 45+1'; Ottosson (yellow card) 58'; Egeli (yellow card) 58'	Stadium: Marienlyst Stadion; Attendance: 4,871; Referee: Christian Moen

13 July 2024 14	Sandefjord	2–1	Bodø/Glimt	Sandefjord
17:00 CEST (UTC+2)	Tveter 28'; Kristiansen 60' (yellow card) 74'; Keto (yellow card) 76'	Report	Berg 61'	Stadium: Jotun Arena; Attendance: 4,179; Referee: Mohammad Usman Aslam

28 July 2024 16	Sandefjord	4–3	Haugesund	Sandefjord
17:00 CEST (UTC+2)	Mettler 25'; Dunsby 35', 38'; Markovic 90+4' (pen.)	Report	Liseth 23'; Leite 47'; Bizoza 74' (yellow card) 76'; Eskesen (yellow card) 79'; Bærtelsen (yellow card) 87'	Stadium: Jotun Arena; Attendance: 3,115; Referee: Kristoffer Hagenes

4 August 2024 17	Sarpsborg	2–1	Sandefjord	Sarpsborg
17:00 CEST (UTC+2)	Johansen 13' (pen.); Meister (yellow card) 18'; Halvorsen 68'	Report	Mettler 48'	Stadium: Sarpsborg Stadion; Attendance: 4,610; Referee: Ola Hobber Nilsen

11 August 2024 18	Sandefjord	2–2	Strømsgodset	Sandefjord
17:00 CEST (UTC+2)	Amin (yellow card) 51'; Valsvik 66' (o.g.); Sigurðarson 75'	Report	E. U. Andersen 5'; Stengel 47'; Vilsvik (yellow card) 80'; Danso (yellow card) 89'	Stadium: Jotun Arena; Attendance: 6,598; Referee: Svein Tore Sinnes

25 August 2024 20	Sandefjord	1–0	Kristiansund	Sandefjord
17:00 CEST (UTC+2)	Loftesnes-Bjune (yellow card) 41'; Jemal 90+5'	Report		Stadium: Jotun Arena; Attendance: 3,359; Referee: Mathias Støfringshaug

1 September 2024 21	HamKam	1–1	Sandefjord	Hamar
17:00 CEST (UTC+2)	Kongsro 62'; Simenstad (yellow card) 89'	Report	Cheng (yellow card) 55'; Sigurðarson 69'; Kristiansen (yellow card) 72'	Stadium: Briskeby Stadion; Attendance: 4,316; Referee: Marius Lien

15 September 2024 22	Sandefjord	2–2	Brann	Sandefjord
17:00 CEST (UTC+2)	Sigurðarson 9'; Kristiansen (yellow card) 39'; Mettler (yellow card) 61' (goal) 65'	Report	Myhre 30'; Castro 90+2'	Stadium: Jotun Arena; Attendance: 4,144; Referee: Christian Moen

22 September 2024 23	Tromsø	3–0	Sandefjord	Tromsø
17:00 CEST (UTC+2)	Nordås 25'; Erlien 36'; Barry 45'	Report		Stadium: Romssa Arena; Attendance: 3,735; Referee: Daniel Higraff

29 September 2024 24	Sandefjord	0–1	Rosenborg	Sandefjord
17:00 CEST (UTC+2)	Amin (yellow card) 52'; Dunsby (yellow card) 53'	Report	Tagseth 62' (yellow card) 71'	Stadium: Jotun Arena; Attendance: 4,701; Referee: Kristoffer Hagenes

5 October 2024 15	Kristiansund	2–1	Sandefjord	Kristiansund
17:00 CEST (UTC+2)	Ndour 45+1', 51'; Igor (yellow card) 61'; Sjåtil (yellow card) 84'; Isaksen (yellow card) 90+2'; Mikaelsson (yellow card) 90+4'	Report	Sigurðarson 58'; Ottosson (yellow card) 66'; Kristiansen (red card) 75'	Stadium: Kristiansund Stadion; Attendance: 3,840; Referee: Rohit Saggi

20 October 2024 25	Molde	0–1	Sandefjord	Molde
17:00 CEST (UTC+2)		Report	Gjone (yellow card) 41'; Mettler 65'	Stadium: Aker Stadion; Attendance: 6,293; Referee: Mohammad Usman Aslam

27 October 2024 26	Sandefjord	2–1	KFUM	Sandefjord
17:00 CET (UTC+1)	Gjone 76'; Amin 90'	Report	Okeke 37' (yellow card) 59'; Ndiaye (yellow card) 55'	Stadium: Jotun Arena; Attendance: 3,543; Referee: Sigurd Smehus Kringstad

3 November 2024 27	Viking	3–2	Sandefjord	Stavanger
17:00 CET (UTC+1)	Salvesen 27', 43', 65'; Cappis (yellow card) 76'	Report	Dunsby 7' (yellow card) 30'; Mettler 24'; Kristiansen (yellow card) 90+3'	Stadium: SR-Bank Arena; Attendance: 10,627; Referee: Espen Eskås

10 November 2024 28	Sandefjord	1–0	Odd	Sandefjord
17:00 CET (UTC+1)	Markovic 58'; Dunsby (yellow card) 69'; Risan Mørk (yellow card) 90'	Report	Solholm Johansen (red card) 90'	Stadium: Jotun Arena; Attendance: 5,497; Referee: Daniel Higraff

23 November 2024 29	Lillestrøm	0–3	Sandefjord	Lillestrøm
17:00 CET (UTC+1)	Røssing-Lelesiit (yellow card) 53'; Jeahze (yellow card) 90+4'	Report	Mettler 39'; Jemal 47'; Keto (yellow card) 80'; Melchior 89'	Stadium: Åråsen Stadion; Attendance: 6,217; Referee: Marius Hansen Grøtta

1 December 2024 30	Sandefjord	0–1	Fredrikstad	Sandefjord
17:00 CET (UTC+1)		Report	Magnússon 64'; Hagen (yellow card) 67'; Fischer (yellow card) 84'	Stadium: Jotun Arena; Attendance: 3,616; Referee: Svein Tore Sinnes

=== Norwegian Football Cup ===
10 April 2024 First round	Fløy	1–0	Sandefjord	Flekkerøy
18:00 CEST (UTC+2)	Osestad 64'; Ystanes (yellow card) 69'; Kloster (yellow card) 76'	Report		Stadium: Flekkerøy stadion Attendance: 512; Referee: Jørgen Haga
