= List of Norwegian football transfers winter 2023–24 =

This is a list of Norwegian football transfers in the 2023–24 winter transfer window by club. Only clubs of the 2024 Eliteserien and 2024 1. divisjon are included.

== Eliteserien ==
=== Bodø/Glimt ===
In: Note: Flags indicate national team as defined under FIFA eligibility rules; some limited exceptions apply. Players may hold more than one non-FIFA nationality.

| No. | Pos. | Nation | Player |
|---|---|---|---|
| 2 | DF | DEN | Villads Nielsen (from (Denmark) Nordsjælland U19) |
| 6 | DF | NOR | Jostein Gundersen (from Tromsø) |
| 9 | FW | DEN | Kasper Høgh (from Stabæk) |
| 16 | MF | NOR | Syver Skundberg Skeide (loan return from Hødd) |
| 17 | MF | NOR | Gaute Vetti (loan return from Stabæk) |
| 21 | DF | CZE | Lucas Kubr (loan return from Moss) |
| 23 | FW | NOR | Jens Petter Hauge (on loan from (Germany) Eintracht Frankfurt) |
| 24 | GK | NOR | Kjetil Haug (on loan from (France) Toulouse) |
| 26 | MF | NOR | Håkon Evjen (from (Denmark) Brøndby) |
| 94 | FW | NOR | August Mikkelsen (from (Sweden) Hammarby) |

Out: Note: Flags indicate national team as defined under FIFA eligibility rules; some limited exceptions apply. Players may hold more than one non-FIFA nationality.

| No. | Pos. | Nation | Player |
|---|---|---|---|
| 2 | DF | NOR | Marius Lode (to (Sweden) Häcken) |
| 6 | DF | NOR | Isak Amundsen (to Molde) |
| 7 | FW | NOR | Amahl Pellegrino (to (United States) San Jose Earthquakes) |
| 16 | MF | NOR | Morten Konradsen (to Haugesund) |
| 22 | FW | NOR | Petter Nosakhare Dahl (on loan to KFUM) |
| 23 | FW | DEN | Jeppe Kjær (on loan to Fredrikstad, previously on loan at Sandefjord) |
| 25 | FW | NOR | Tobias Fjeld Gulliksen (to (Sweden) Djurgården) |
| 26 | DF | NOR | Sigurd Kvile (to Fredrikstad, previously on loan) |
| 29 | FW | CMR | Faris Moumbagna (to (France) Marseille) |
| 47 | DF | NOR | Stian Kristiansen (to Sandefjord) |

=== Brann ===
In: Note: Flags indicate national team as defined under FIFA eligibility rules; some limited exceptions apply. Players may hold more than one non-FIFA nationality.

| No. | Pos. | Nation | Player |
|---|---|---|---|
| 2 | FW | NOR | Martin Hellan (from Kongsvinger) |
| 10 | MF | DEN | Emil Kornvig (from (Italy) Cittadella) |
| 12 | GK | NOR | Martin Børsheim (promoted from junior squad) |
| 24 | GK | NOR | Mathias Klausen (promoted from junior squad) |
| 26 | DF | NOR | Eivind Helland (promoted from junior squad) |
| 36 | GK | NOR | Eirik Holmen Johansen (from Eik Tønsberg) |

Out: Note: Flags indicate national team as defined under FIFA eligibility rules; some limited exceptions apply. Players may hold more than one non-FIFA nationality.

| No. | Pos. | Nation | Player |
|---|---|---|---|
| 10 | MF | DEN | Frederik Børsting (to (Denmark) Vendsyssel) |
| 12 | GK | NOR | Eirik Holmen Johansen (to Eik Tønsberg) |
| 31 | MF | NOR | Isak Tomar Hjorteseth (on loan to Sandnes Ulf, previously on loan at Åsane) |
| 41 | FW | NOR | Elias Myrlid (to Hødd, previously on loan at Kongsvinger) |
| – | FW | NOR | Filip Møller Delaveris (released, previously on loan at Sandnes Ulf) |

=== Fredrikstad ===
In: Note: Flags indicate national team as defined under FIFA eligibility rules; some limited exceptions apply. Players may hold more than one non-FIFA nationality.

| No. | Pos. | Nation | Player |
|---|---|---|---|
| 10 | MF | NOR | Morten Bjørlo (from Rosenborg) |
| 11 | FW | GUI | Maï Traoré (from Viking) |
| 17 | DF | NOR | Sigurd Kvile (from Bodø/Glimt, previously on loan) |
| 20 | FW | DEN | Jeppe Kjær (on loan from Bodø/Glimt) |
| 21 | DF | NOR | Oscar Kjøge Jansson (loan return from Raufoss) |
| 23 | MF | NOR | Erlend Segberg (from Aalesund) |
| 30 | GK | DEN | Jonathan Fischer (from (Denmark) Hobro) |
| 33 | MF | NOR | Filip Stensland (loan return from Kvik Halden) |

Out: Note: Flags indicate national team as defined under FIFA eligibility rules; some limited exceptions apply. Players may hold more than one non-FIFA nationality.

| No. | Pos. | Nation | Player |
|---|---|---|---|
| 10 | FW | SWE | Lucas Lima (on loan to (Sweden) Utsikten, previously on loan at (Sweden) Helsingborg) |
| 11 | FW | DOM | Riki Alba (to (United States) Las Vegas Lights) |
| 15 | FW | NGR | Innocent Kingsley (released) |
| 16 | MF | MLI | Aboubacar Konté (to (Georgia (country)) Dila Gori) |
| 17 | DF | NOR | Tage Johansen (to Hødd, previously on loan at Skeid) |
| 20 | MF | NOR | Håvard Huser Åsheim (released) |
| 23 | MF | NOR | Mikail Maden (to (Denmark) Esbjerg) |
| 24 | FW | SWE | Noa Williams (to Kongsvinger, previously on loan at Skeid) |
| 27 | DF | DEN | Mikkel Lassen (loan return to (Denmark) Horsens) |
| 28 | DF | NOR | Imre Bech Hermansen (on loan to Bryne) |

=== HamKam ===
In: Note: Flags indicate national team as defined under FIFA eligibility rules; some limited exceptions apply. Players may hold more than one non-FIFA nationality.

| No. | Pos. | Nation | Player |
|---|---|---|---|
| 1 | GK | NOR | Sander Kaldråstøyl Østraat (from Haugesund) |
| 3 | DF | USA | Sam Rogers (on loan from Lillestrøm) |
| 14 | DF | NED | Luc Mares (from Start) |
| 15 | MF | NOR | William Osnes-Ringen (from Vålerenga 2) |
| 17 | MF | NOR | Niklas Ødegård (on loan from Molde) |
| 18 | DF | NOR | Gard Simenstad (from Raufoss) |
| 22 | DF | NOR | Snorre Strand Nilsen (from Kristiansund) |
| 30 | GK | SWE | Alexander Nilsson (from (Sweden) J-Södra) |

Out: Note: Flags indicate national team as defined under FIFA eligibility rules; some limited exceptions apply. Players may hold more than one non-FIFA nationality.

| No. | Pos. | Nation | Player |
|---|---|---|---|
| 1 | GK | NOR | Lars Jendal (to Sogndal) |
| 3 | DF | DEN | Jens Martin Gammelby (to (Denmark) Silkeborg) |
| 5 | DF | CAN | Julian Dunn (to (Canada) Halifax Wanderers) |
| 9 | FW | NOR | Jonas Enkerud (to (Finland) Gnistan) |
| 15 | FW | CIV | Ibrahim Romeo Olola (to (Albania) Lushnja) |
| 18 | MF | NOR | Morten Bjørlo (loan return to Rosenborg) |
| 22 | MF | USA | Kobe Hernandez-Foster (to (United States) Birmingham Legion) |
| 27 | DF | NOR | Amin Nouri (to KFUM) |
| 28 | GK | NOR | Petter Eichler Jensen (to Raufoss) |
| 30 | MF | CIV | Archange Mondouo (deceased) |
| 33 | DF | NOR | Aleksander Melgalvis (to Ridabu) |

=== Haugesund ===
In: Note: Flags indicate national team as defined under FIFA eligibility rules; some limited exceptions apply. Players may hold more than one non-FIFA nationality.

| No. | Pos. | Nation | Player |
|---|---|---|---|
| 5 | DF | ISL | Hlynur Freyr Karlsson (from (Iceland) Valur) |
| 7 | MF | DEN | Mathias Sauer (on loan from (Denmark) AGF) |
| 8 | MF | NOR | Morten Konradsen (from Bodø/Glimt) |
| 10 | MF | NOR | Emir Derviskadic (from Start) |
| 13 | MF | ISL | Anton Logi Lúðvíksson (from (Iceland) Breiðablik) |
| 17 | FW | KOR | Seo Jong-min (from (Germany) Dynamo Dresden) |
| 20 | FW | BFA | Ismaël Seone (from (Burkina Faso) Salitas) |
| 22 | GK | NOR | Aslak Falch (from Sandnes Ulf) |
| 31 | GK | NOR | Einar Bøe Fauskanger (promoted from junior squad) |
| 39 | MF | NOR | Martin Alvsaker (promoted from junior squad) |
| 40 | MF | NOR | Almar Grindhaug (promoted from junior squad) |

Out: Note: Flags indicate national team as defined under FIFA eligibility rules; some limited exceptions apply. Players may hold more than one non-FIFA nationality.

| No. | Pos. | Nation | Player |
|---|---|---|---|
| 6 | MF | DEN | Magnus Christensen (to Stabæk) |
| 7 | MF | DEN | Peter Therkildsen (to (Sweden) Djurgården) |
| 8 | MF | NOR | Kevin Krygård (to (Portugal) Casa Pia) |
| 16 | FW | NOR | Alexander Søderlund (released) |
| 17 | FW | NGR | Oluwasegun Otusanya (loan return to (Nigeria) Stars Builders Academy) |
| 20 | MF | COD | Michee Ngalina (loan return to (Turkey) Göztepe) |
| 23 | MF | NED | Daan Huisman (loan return to (Netherlands) Vitesse) |
| 30 | FW | ISL | Kjartan Kári Halldórsson (to (Iceland) FH, previously on loan) |
| 36 | DF | NOR | Eivind Helgeland (on loan to Mjøndalen) |
| 42 | GK | NOR | Sander Kaldråstøyl Østraat (to Hamkam) |
| 55 | DF | SEN | Madiodio Dia (on loan to Egersund) |
| 99 | FW | SOM | Bilal Njie (to Odd) |
| – | GK | NOR | Frank Stople (to Strømsgodset, previously on loan at Vard) |

=== KFUM ===
In: Note: Flags indicate national team as defined under FIFA eligibility rules; some limited exceptions apply. Players may hold more than one non-FIFA nationality.

| No. | Pos. | Nation | Player |
|---|---|---|---|
| 2 | DF | NOR | Haitam Aleesami (free transfer) |
| 13 | GK | NOR | William Da Rocha (from Kjelsås) |
| 19 | FW | NOR | Niclas Schjøth Semmen (from Drøbak-Frogn) |
| 22 | FW | NOR | Petter Nosakhare Dahl (on loan from Bodø/Glimt) |
| 28 | FW | SEN | Mame Mor Ndiaye (from Åsane) |
| 31 | GK | NOR | Henri Sørlie (promoted from junior squad) |
| 33 | DF | NOR | Amin Nouri (from Hamkam) |
| 42 | FW | NOR | David Hickson (from Skeid) |
| 43 | MF | USA | Adam Saldana (from (United States) LA Galaxy) |

Out: Note: Flags indicate national team as defined under FIFA eligibility rules; some limited exceptions apply. Players may hold more than one non-FIFA nationality.

| No. | Pos. | Nation | Player |
|---|---|---|---|
| 2 | DF | NOR | Keivan Ghaedamini (to Skeid) |
| 12 | GK | NOR | Andreas Vedeler (on loan to Bærum) |
| 13 | GK | NOR | Morten Stakkeng Vang (to Gamle Oslo) |
| 20 | FW | NOR | Yasir Sa'Ad (on loan to Grorud) |
| 21 | FW | NOR | Sondre Spieler Halvorsen (on loan to Follo) |
| 28 | MF | NOR | Jones El-Abdellaoui (loan return to Vålerenga) |
| 31 | GK | IRI | Sosha Makani (released) |
| 33 | DF | NOR | William Silfver-Ramage (to (Italy) Hellas Verona Primavera) |

=== Kristiansund ===
In: Note: Flags indicate national team as defined under FIFA eligibility rules; some limited exceptions apply. Players may hold more than one non-FIFA nationality.

| No. | Pos. | Nation | Player |
|---|---|---|---|
| 1 | GK | USA | Michael Lansing (from Aalesund) |
| 7 | FW | SEN | Pape Habib Guèye (on loan from (Scotland) Aberdeen) |
| 8 | MF | NOR | Ruben Alte (from Ranheim) |
| 9 | FW | ISL | Hilmir Rafn Mikaelsson (on loan from (Italy) Venezia) |
| 11 | FW | NOR | Franklin Nyenetue (from Sandefjord) |
| 22 | DF | NOR | Håkon Sjåtil (from Åsane) |
| 24 | MF | NGR | Wilfred George Igor (from (Nigeria) Hype Buzz, previously on loan) |
| 33 | FW | NOR | Haakon Haugen (promoted from junior squad) |
| 34 | MF | NOR | Andreas Bakeng-Rogne (promoted from junior squad) |

Out: Note: Flags indicate national team as defined under FIFA eligibility rules; some limited exceptions apply. Players may hold more than one non-FIFA nationality.

| No. | Pos. | Nation | Player |
|---|---|---|---|
| 1 | GK | IRL | Sean McDermott (released) |
| 2 | DF | NOR | Snorre Strand Nilsen (to Hamkam) |
| 7 | FW | NOR | Torgil Øwre Gjertsen (retired) |
| 9 | FW | NOR | Benjamin Stokke (to (Iceland) Breiðablik) |
| 21 | MF | NOR | Marius Sivertsen Broholm (loan return to Rosenborg) |
| 36 | DF | NOR | Bendik Brevik (to (Sweden) Piteå, previously on loan) |
| 38 | FW | NOR | Awet Alemseged (on loan to Arendal) |

=== Lillestrøm ===
In: Note: Flags indicate national team as defined under FIFA eligibility rules; some limited exceptions apply. Players may hold more than one non-FIFA nationality.

| No. | Pos. | Nation | Player |
|---|---|---|---|
| 1 | GK | NOR | Stefan Hagerup (from Ull/Kisa) |
| 15 | FW | NOR | Erling Knudtzon (from Molde) |
| 17 | MF | NOR | Eric Kitolano (from Molde) |
| 18 | MF | SWE | August Karlin (from (Sweden) Malmö) |
| 20 | FW | ANG | Felix Vá (on loan from (Sweden) Djurgården) |
| 21 | FW | NOR | Daniel Skaarud (promoted from junior squad) |
| 24 | MF | NGR | Efe Lucky (from (Nigeria) Collins Edwin) |
| 26 | FW | NOR | Oliver Odde Henriksrud (promoted from junior squad) |
| 27 | FW | NOR | Uranik Seferi (loan return from Strømmen) |
| 30 | DF | NOR | Sander Moen Foss (from Sandefjord) |
| 64 | DF | SWE | Eric Larsson (from (Greece) OFI) |
| 90 | MF | NOR | El Schaddai Furaha (promoted from junior squad) |

Out: Note: Flags indicate national team as defined under FIFA eligibility rules; some limited exceptions apply. Players may hold more than one non-FIFA nationality.

| No. | Pos. | Nation | Player |
|---|---|---|---|
| 1 | GK | NOR | Knut-André Skjærstein (to Egersund, previously on loan) |
| 5 | DF | USA | Sam Rogers (on loan to Hamkam) |
| 15 | MF | CAN | Kosi Thompson (loan return to (Canada) Toronto) |
| 20 | DF | NOR | Vetle Skjærvik (to Tromsø) |
| 22 | DF | NOR | Philip Slørdahl (to Ranheim) |
| 25 | MF | NOR | Eskil Edh (to (Sweden) AIK) |
| 26 | FW | NOR | Oliver Odde Henriksrud (on loan to Strømmen) |
| 29 | GK | NOR | Jørgen Sveinhaug (on loan to Strømmen) |
| 31 | MF | NOR | Martin Bergum (to Ull/Kisa, previously on loan at Strømmen) |
| – | DF | NOR | Marcus Paulsen (on loan to Ull/Kisa, previously on loan at Strømmen) |
| – | MF | NOR | Dylan Murugesapillai (released, previously on loan at Træff) |

=== Molde ===
In: Note: Flags indicate national team as defined under FIFA eligibility rules; some limited exceptions apply. Players may hold more than one non-FIFA nationality.

| No. | Pos. | Nation | Player |
|---|---|---|---|
| 4 | DF | DEN | Valdemar Lund (from (Denmark) København) |
| 6 | MF | NOR | Alwande Roaldsøy (from (Italy) Atalanta U23) |
| 11 | FW | NGR | Aaron Samuel (from (Azerbaijan) Neftçi PFK) |
| 17 | MF | NOR | Mats Møller Dæhli (from (Germany) 1. FC Nürnberg) |
| 18 | MF | NOR | Halldor Stenevik (from Strømsgodset) |
| 22 | GK | POL | Albert Posiadała (from (Poland) Wisła Puławy) |
| 23 | MF | NOR | Sondre Granaas (from Mjøndalen) |
| 26 | DF | NOR | Isak Amundsen (from Bodø/Glimt) |
| 29 | FW | NOR | Gustav Nyheim (promoted from junior squad) |

Out: Note: Flags indicate national team as defined under FIFA eligibility rules; some limited exceptions apply. Players may hold more than one non-FIFA nationality.

| No. | Pos. | Nation | Player |
|---|---|---|---|
| 4 | MF | USA | Christian Cappis (loan return to (Denmark) Brøndby) |
| 6 | MF | NOR | Martin Ellingsen (to (Sweden) AIK) |
| 10 | MF | NOR | Eric Kitolano (to Lillestrøm) |
| 14 | FW | NOR | Erling Knudtzon (to Lillestrøm) |
| 22 | MF | NOR | Magnus Grødem (to (Switzerland) Yverdon-Sport) |
| 33 | MF | NOR | Niklas Ødegård (on loan to Hamkam) |
| 34 | GK | NOR | Peder Hoel Lervik (on loan to Eidsvold Turn) |
| 46 | MF | NOR | Andreas Myklebust (on loan to Kvik Halden) |
| – | DF | DEN | Benjamin Tiedemann Hansen (to (Sweden) AIK, previously on loan) |
| – | MF | SWE | Harun Ibrahim (on loan to (Sweden) GAIS, previously on loan at (Sweden) Sirius) |

=== Odd ===
In: Note: Flags indicate national team as defined under FIFA eligibility rules; some limited exceptions apply. Players may hold more than one non-FIFA nationality.

| No. | Pos. | Nation | Player |
|---|---|---|---|
| 1 | GK | NOR | André Hansen (from Rosenborg) |
| 5 | DF | FIN | Tony Miettinen (from (Finland) KuPS) |
| 8 | MF | NOR | Etzaz Hussain (from (Cyprus) Apollon Limassol) |
| 15 | DF | SRB | Mihajlo Ivančević (on loan from (Denmark) OB) |
| 19 | FW | NOR | Torgeir Børven (from Vålerenga) |
| 24 | FW | SOM | Bilal Njie (from Haugesund) |
| 25 | DF | NOR | Godwill Ambrose (from Gjøvik-Lyn) |
| 27 | MF | NOR | Oliver Jordan Hagen (promoted from junior squad) |
| 32 | FW | NOR | Elion Krosa (promoted from junior squad) |

Out: Note: Flags indicate national team as defined under FIFA eligibility rules; some limited exceptions apply. Players may hold more than one non-FIFA nationality.

| No. | Pos. | Nation | Player |
|---|---|---|---|
| 1 | GK | NOR | Per Kristian Bråtveit (to Strømsgodset) |
| 5 | DF | FIN | Diogo Tomas (to (Finland) HJK) |
| 6 | MF | GHA | Leonard Owusu (to (Serbia) Partizan) |
| 23 | FW | NOR | Anders Hartveit Ryste (on loan to Notodden) |
| 24 | MF | NOR | Dennis Gjengaar (to (United States) New York Red Bulls) |
| — | GK | NOR | Sondre Rossbach (to Stabæk, previously on loan at (Sweden) Degerfors) |
| — | FW | NOR | Abel William Stensrud (to (Netherlands) TOP Oss, previously on loan at Moss) |

=== Rosenborg ===
In: Note: Flags indicate national team as defined under FIFA eligibility rules; some limited exceptions apply. Players may hold more than one non-FIFA nationality.

| No. | Pos. | Nation | Player |
|---|---|---|---|
| 12 | GK | NOR | Rasmus Sandberg (from Stjørdals-Blink) |
| 21 | DF | SVK | Tomáš Nemčík (on loan from (Slovakia) Žilina) |
| 22 | FW | FIN | Agon Sadiku (loan return from Start) |
| 39 | MF | NOR | Marius Sivertsen Broholm (loan return from Kristiansund) |
| 40 | FW | NOR | Pawel Chrupalla (loan return from (Poland) Wisła Płock) |
| 45 | FW | NOR | Jesper Reitan-Sunde (promoted from junior squad) |
| 50 | DF | NOR | Håkon Volden (promoted from junior squad) |

Out: Note: Flags indicate national team as defined under FIFA eligibility rules; some limited exceptions apply. Players may hold more than one non-FIFA nationality.

| No. | Pos. | Nation | Player |
|---|---|---|---|
| 1 | GK | NOR | André Hansen (to Odd) |
| 5 | MF | NOR | Per Ciljan Skjelbred (to Ranheim) |
| 16 | DF | NOR | Håkon Røsten (on loan to Ranheim) |
| 17 | FW | ISL | Ísak Þorvaldsson (on loan to (Iceland) Breiðablik) |
| 18 | MF | NOR | Morten Bjørlo (to Fredrikstad, previously on loan at HamKam) |
| 21 | MF | NOR | Olaus Skarsem (to (Bulgaria) CSKA Sofia) |
| 28 | FW | SWE | Rasmus Wiedesheim-Paul (to (Sweden) Halmstad) |

=== Sandefjord ===
In: Note: Flags indicate national team as defined under FIFA eligibility rules; some limited exceptions apply. Players may hold more than one non-FIFA nationality.

| No. | Pos. | Nation | Player |
|---|---|---|---|
| 5 | DF | NOR | Andreas van der Spa (from Sogndal) |
| 7 | MF | NOR | Eman Markovic (on loan from (Sweden) IFK Göteborg) |
| 10 | MF | SUI | Loris Mettler (from Raufoss) |
| 11 | FW | SWE | Darrell Kamdem Tibell (from (Sweden) Norrköping) |
| 16 | FW | NOR | Wally Njie (loan return from Ørn Horten) |
| 17 | DF | NOR | Christopher Cheng (from Arendal) |
| 20 | DF | NOR | Marcus Melchior (from Skeid) |
| 24 | MF | NOR | Sebastian Holm Mathisen (promoted from junior squad) |
| 45 | FW | NOR | Beltran Mvuka (from Sotra) |
| 47 | DF | NOR | Stian Kristiansen (from Bodø/Glimt) |
| 99 | DF | GAM | Maudo Jarjué (from (Sweden) Elfsborg) |

Out: Note: Flags indicate national team as defined under FIFA eligibility rules; some limited exceptions apply. Players may hold more than one non-FIFA nationality.

| No. | Pos. | Nation | Player |
|---|---|---|---|
| 2 | DF | NOR | Fredrik Mani Pålerud (to Start) |
| 7 | FW | GHA | Gilbert Koomson (to (Israel) Hapoel Petach Tikva) |
| 10 | FW | DEN | Jeppe Kjær (loan return to Bodø/Glimt) |
| 11 | FW | NOR | Youssef Chaib (released) |
| 12 | GK | NOR | Mats Viken (to Start) |
| 13 | DF | NOR | Lars Markmanrud (to Jerv, previously on loan at Egersund) |
| 15 | DF | NOR | Jesper Taaje (to Strømsgodset) |
| 17 | DF | NOR | Sander Moen Foss (to Lillestrøm) |
| 20 | FW | NOR | Franklin Nyenetue (to Kristiansund) |
| 22 | DF | NOR | Jørgen Kili Fjeldskår (to Fram, previously on loan) |
| 23 | MF | RSA | Keanin Ayer (to (Denmark) Næstved) |

=== Sarpsborg 08 ===
In: Note: Flags indicate national team as defined under FIFA eligibility rules; some limited exceptions apply. Players may hold more than one non-FIFA nationality.

| No. | Pos. | Nation | Player |
|---|---|---|---|
| 1 | GK | SEN | Mamour Ndiaye (from (Senegal) Oslo FA) |
| 6 | MF | SWE | Aimar Sher (free transfer) |
| 7 | FW | NOR | Martin Hoel Andersen (loan return from Kongsvinger) |
| 10 | MF | NOR | Stefan Johansen (free transfer) |
| 22 | MF | NOR | Victor Emanuel Halvorsen (loan return from Kjelsås) |
| 26 | FW | NGR | Daniel Job (on loan from (Nigeria) Future Pro) |
| 27 | FW | NOR | Sondre Ørjasæter (from Sogndal) |
| 31 | GK | SRB | Marko Ilić (on loan from (United States) Colorado Rapids) |
| 77 | DF | NOR | Markus Olsvik Welinder (loan return from Kjelsås) |
| – | MF | NOR | Jakob Auby (promoted from junior squad) |

Out: Note: Flags indicate national team as defined under FIFA eligibility rules; some limited exceptions apply. Players may hold more than one non-FIFA nationality.

| No. | Pos. | Nation | Player |
|---|---|---|---|
| 1 | GK | NOR | Kjetil Haug (loan return to (France) Toulouse) |
| 4 | DF | NOR | Bjørn Inge Utvik (to (Canada) Vancouver Whitecaps) |
| 6 | MF | NOR | Martin Høyland (to Sogndal) |
| 10 | MF | SWE | Ramon Pascal Lundqvist (to (Turkey) Göztepe) |
| 12 | GK | NOR | Jarik Sundling (on loan to Kvik Halden, previously on loan at Sogndal) |
| 16 | DF | NOR | Joachim Thomassen (released) |
| 21 | GK | NOR | Anders Kristiansen (on loan to (Sweden) IFK Göteborg) |
| 22 | FW | NOR | Kristian Fardal Opseth (to Stabæk) |
| 25 | MF | DEN | Mikkel Maigaard (to (Poland) Cracovia) |
| 29 | MF | DEN | Victor Torp (to (England) Coventry City) |
| – | GK | NOR | Simen Vidtun Nilsen (to Ranheim, previously on loan at Skeid) |
| – | FW | DEN | Gustav Mogensen (to Ranheim, previously on loan at Hødd) |
| – | MF | NOR | Jakob Auby (on loan to Kvik Halden) |

=== Strømsgodset ===
In: Note: Flags indicate national team as defined under FIFA eligibility rules; some limited exceptions apply. Players may hold more than one non-FIFA nationality.

| No. | Pos. | Nation | Player |
|---|---|---|---|
| 1 | GK | NOR | Per Kristian Bråtveit (from Odd) |
| 4 | DF | NOR | Sivert Westerlund (from Raufoss) |
| 9 | FW | NOR | Elias Hoff Melkersen (from (Scotland) Hibs, previously on loan) |
| 12 | GK | NOR | Simo Lampinen-Skaug (from (Italy) Lecce Primavera) |
| 16 | DF | GAM | Dadi Gaye (on loan from Tromsø) |
| 25 | DF | NOR | Jesper Taaje (from Sandefjord) |
| 32 | GK | NOR | Frank Stople (from Haugesund) |
| 37 | MF | NOR | Samuel Silalahi (promoted from junior squad) |

Out: Note: Flags indicate national team as defined under FIFA eligibility rules; some limited exceptions apply. Players may hold more than one non-FIFA nationality.

| No. | Pos. | Nation | Player |
|---|---|---|---|
| 1 | GK | NOR | Viljar Myhra (to (Denmark) OB) |
| 2 | DF | ISL | Ari Leifsson (to (Denmark) Kolding) |
| 4 | DF | NOR | Thomas Grøgaard (to Aalesund) |
| 7 | MF | NOR | Halldor Stenevik (to Molde) |
| 19 | FW | NOR | Chrisander B. Sørum (demoted to junior squad) |
| 28 | DF | NOR | Eirik Espelid Blikstad (to Hødd) |
| 40 | GK | NOR | Morten Sætra (to Levanger) |

=== Tromsø ===
In: Note: Flags indicate national team as defined under FIFA eligibility rules; some limited exceptions apply. Players may hold more than one non-FIFA nationality.

| No. | Pos. | Nation | Player |
|---|---|---|---|
| 3 | DF | NOR | Jesper Robertsen (loan return from Mjøndalen) |
| 4 | DF | NOR | Vetle Skjærvik (from Lillestrøm) |
| 14 | DF | SEN | Mamadou Thierno Barry (from (Senegal) Academie Mawade Wade) |
| 18 | MF | NOR | Markus Johnsgård (from Raufoss) |
| 21 | DF | NOR | Tobias Guddal (from Bryne) |
| 26 | DF | NOR | Isak Vik (loan return from Tromsdalen) |
| 27 | FW | SEN | Yoro Ba (from (Senegal) Academie Bloc 16 Diamamague) |

Out: Note: Flags indicate national team as defined under FIFA eligibility rules; some limited exceptions apply. Players may hold more than one non-FIFA nationality.

| No. | Pos. | Nation | Player |
|---|---|---|---|
| 2 | DF | NOR | Oskar Opsahl (on loan to Egersund) |
| 4 | DF | NOR | Jostein Gundersen (to Bodø/Glimt) |
| 14 | DF | NOR | Tobias Vonheim Norbye (on loan to Alta) |
| 19 | DF | DEN | Niklas Vesterlund (to (Netherlands) Utrecht) |
| 20 | DF | GAM | Dadi Gaye (on loan to Strømsgodset) |
| 21 | MF | NOR | Tobias Hafstad (to Tromsdalen, previously on loan at Egersund) |
| 26 | DF | SEN | El Hadji Malick Diouf (to (Czech Republic) Slavia Praha) |
| 29 | FW | GUI | Maï Traoré (loan return to Viking) |
| 32 | GK | NOR | Marius Tollefsen (to Tromsdalen) |
| 32 | GK | NOR | Mats Trige (on loan to Alta, previously on loan at Alta) |

=== Viking ===
In: Note: Flags indicate national team as defined under FIFA eligibility rules; some limited exceptions apply. Players may hold more than one non-FIFA nationality.

| No. | Pos. | Nation | Player |
|---|---|---|---|
| 13 | GK | NOR | Magnus Rugland Ree (loan return from Egersund) |
| 17 | FW | NOR | Edvin Austbø (loan return from Sandnes Ulf) |
| 20 | DF | AUS | Franco Lino (from (Australia) Melbourne Victory) |
| 22 | FW | DEN | Peter Christiansen (from (Denmark) SønderjyskE) |
| 24 | DF | NOR | Vetle Auklend (promoted from junior squad) |
| 26 | FW | NOR | Simen Kvia-Egeskog (loan return from Skeid) |
| 32 | MF | NOR | Kasper Sætherbø (promoted from junior squad) |
| 34 | DF | NOR | Kristoffer Forgaard Paulsen (loan return from Junkeren) |
| 41 | DF | NOR | Jone Berg (promoted from junior squad) |

Out: Note: Flags indicate national team as defined under FIFA eligibility rules; some limited exceptions apply. Players may hold more than one non-FIFA nationality.

| No. | Pos. | Nation | Player |
|---|---|---|---|
| 4 | DF | SLO | David Brekalo (to (United States) Orlando City) |
| 8 | MF | NOR | Markus Solbakken (to (Czech Republic) Sparta Prague) |
| 13 | GK | NOR | Magnus Rugland Ree (on loan to Egersund) |
| 20 | DF | IDN | Shayne Pattynama (to (Belgium) Eupen) |
| 24 | FW | GUI | Maï Traoré (to Fredrikstad, previously on loan at Tromsø) |
| 27 | FW | NGR | Samuel Adegbenro (loan return to (China) Beijing Guoan) |
| 28 | MF | NOR | Lars Erik Sødal (to Bryne, previously on loan) |

== 1. divisjon ==
=== Aalesund ===
In: Note: Flags indicate national team as defined under FIFA eligibility rules; some limited exceptions apply. Players may hold more than one non-FIFA nationality.

| No. | Pos. | Nation | Player |
|---|---|---|---|
| 5 | DF | NOR | Thomas Grøgaard (from Strømsgodset) |
| 7 | FW | NOR | Kristoffer Nessø (from Sogndal) |
| 10 | FW | POR | Cláudio Braga (from Moss) |
| 11 | MF | ISL | David Jóhannsson (from (Iceland) FH) |
| 17 | MF | NOR | Noah Solskjær (from Spjelkavik) |
| 20 | DF | MKD | Metodi Maksimov (on loan from (Austria) LASK) |
| 31 | MF | NOR | John Ruud Norvik (promoted from junior squad) |
| 32 | FW | NOR | Kristian Lonebu (promoted from junior squad) |
| 34 | DF | NOR | Thomas Gulbrandsen (promoted from junior squad) |

Out: Note: Flags indicate national team as defined under FIFA eligibility rules; some limited exceptions apply. Players may hold more than one non-FIFA nationality.

| No. | Pos. | Nation | Player |
|---|---|---|---|
| 2 | DF | NOR | Trace Akino Murray (to Hødd) |
| 3 | DF | NOR | Jeppe Moe (retired) |
| 5 | DF | SWE | David Fällman (to (Sweden) Stockholm) |
| 6 | MF | NOR | Erlend Segberg (to Fredrikstad) |
| 7 | MF | DEN | Tobias Klysner (loan return to (Denmark) Randers) |
| 11 | FW | NGR | Moses Ebiye (to (Scotland) Motherwell) |
| 13 | GK | USA | Michael Lansing (to Kristiansund) |
| 14 | DF | NOR | Ole Martin Kolskogen (to Åsane, previously on loan) |
| 15 | FW | NOR | Kristoffer Ødemarksbakken (released) |
| 17 | FW | SEN | Mamadou Diaw (to (Iceland) Keflavík, previously on loan at Sandnes Ulf) |
| 20 | MF | NOR | Oscar Solnørdal (to Brattvåg) |
| 30 | DF | DEN | Alexander Juel Andersen (released) |
| 34 | DF | NOR | Stian Aarønes Holte (on loan to Alta) |
| 36 | DF | NOR | Christian Mork Breivik (to Tromsdalen) |
| 41 | MF | NOR | Iver Krogh Hagen (to Hødd) |
| — | MF | NOR | Kristoffer Barmen (to Åsane, previously on loan) |

=== Bryne ===
In: Note: Flags indicate national team as defined under FIFA eligibility rules; some limited exceptions apply. Players may hold more than one non-FIFA nationality.

| No. | Pos. | Nation | Player |
|---|---|---|---|
| 2 | DF | GER | Luis Görlich (from (Netherlands) Zwolle) |
| 5 | DF | DEN | Jacob Haahr Steffensen (from (Denmark) Fremad Amager) |
| 9 | MF | NOR | Lars Erik Sødal (from Viking, previously on loan) |
| 11 | FW | KEN | Alfred Scriven (from Hødd) |
| 15 | DF | NOR | Jon-Helge Tveita (from Start) |
| 17 | FW | NOR | Elias Ivesdal Årsvoll (loan return from Notodden) |
| 19 | DF | NOR | Imre Bech Hermansen (on loan from Fredrikstad) |
| 23 | FW | NOR | Kristian Skurve Håland (from Frøyland) |

Out: Note: Flags indicate national team as defined under FIFA eligibility rules; some limited exceptions apply. Players may hold more than one non-FIFA nationality.

| No. | Pos. | Nation | Player |
|---|---|---|---|
| 2 | DF | NOR | Oliver Rotihaug (to Raufoss) |
| 5 | DF | FRO | Rógvi Baldvinsson (retired) |
| 15 | DF | NOR | Jørgen Hatlehol (released) |
| 19 | DF | NOR | Tobias Guddal (to Tromsø) |
| 23 | DF | NOR | Paul Endre Ullenes (to Notodden) |
| 25 | | SWE | Daniel Hermansson (to (Sweden) Utsikten) |
| 45 | DF | NOR | Christian Røer (released) |
| – | FW | NOR | Arne Gunnes (to Levanger, previously on loan at Ranheim) |
| – | FW | NOR | Ingmar Orkelbog Austberg (to Tiller, previously on loan) |

=== Egersund ===
In: Note: Flags indicate national team as defined under FIFA eligibility rules; some limited exceptions apply. Players may hold more than one non-FIFA nationality.

| No. | Pos. | Nation | Player |
|---|---|---|---|
| 4 | DF | NOR | Henrik Falchener (from Ørn Horten) |
| 5 | DF | NOR | Oskar Opsahl (on loan from Tromsø) |
| 6 | DF | NOR | Tord Salte (from Arendal) |
| 13 | GK | NOR | Magnus Rugland Ree (on loan from Viking) |
| 15 | MF | NOR | Henrik Elvevold (from Lyn) |
| 17 | MF | NOR | Ingvald Halgunset (from Sandnes Ulf) |
| 20 | FW | NOR | Andreas Helmersen (from Raufoss) |
| 23 | FW | NOR | Magnus Høiseth (from Ranheim, previously on loan) |
| 21 | MF | NOR | Kristian Kjeverud Eggen (from Notodden) |
| 22 | MF | NOR | Horenus Tadesse (from Sandnes Ulf) |
| 24 | DF | SEN | Madiodio Dia (on loan from Haugesund) |
| 26 | FW | LBR | Justin Salmon (from Degerfors) |
| 31 | GK | NOR | Knut-André Skjærstein (from Lillestrøm, previously on loan) |

Out: Note: Flags indicate national team as defined under FIFA eligibility rules; some limited exceptions apply. Players may hold more than one non-FIFA nationality.

| No. | Pos. | Nation | Player |
|---|---|---|---|
| 6 | MF | NOR | Sivert Strangstad (to Jerv) |
| 13 | DF | NOR | Lars Markmanrud (loan return to Sandefjord) |
| 13 | GK | NOR | Magnus Rugland Ree (loan return to Viking) |
| 15 | FW | NOR | Torben Dvergsdal (to Vard) |
| 16 | FW | NOR | Trygve Rogstad (to Eiger) |
| 17 | FW | NOR | Aleksander Nygård Kjellmann (to Eiger, previously on loan) |
| 21 | MF | NOR | Tobias Hafstad (loan return to Tromsø) |
| 22 | GK | NOR | Henrik Urdal (to Eiger) |
| 77 | DF | DEN | Mads Nørby Madsen (to Trauma) |

=== Kongsvinger ===
In: Note: Flags indicate national team as defined under FIFA eligibility rules; some limited exceptions apply. Players may hold more than one non-FIFA nationality.

| No. | Pos. | Nation | Player |
|---|---|---|---|
| 2 | DF | SWE | Joel Nilsson (from (Sweden) Hammarby) |
| 3 | DF | ISL | Róbert Orri Þorkelsson (on loan from (Canada) CF Montreal) |
| 11 | FW | SWE | Noa Williams (from Fredrikstad) |
| 12 | DF | SEN | Mapenda Mbow (from (Senegal) Espoirs De Guediawaye) |
| 14 | FW | DEN | Lucas Haren (from (Denmark) Fremad Amager) |
| 16 | DF | NOR | Marius Trengereid (from Brann 2) |
| 19 | DF | DEN | Emil Arendrup Nielsen (from (Denmark) Vendsyssel) |
| 30 | DF | NOR | Elias Berstad Tenden (promoted from junior squad) |
| 31 | GK | CIV | Sayouba Mandé (free transfer) |
| 41 | GK | NOR | Mads Edwin Lindegaard (promoted from junior squad) |

Out: Note: Flags indicate national team as defined under FIFA eligibility rules; some limited exceptions apply. Players may hold more than one non-FIFA nationality.

| No. | Pos. | Nation | Player |
|---|---|---|---|
| 3 | DF | NOR | Victor Grodås (to Skjetten) |
| 11 | FW | NOR | Martin Hoel Andersen (loan return to Sarpsborg 08) |
| 12 | DF | NOR | Mats Haakenstad (released) |
| 13 | DF | NOR | Matias Rogstad Aadnøy (to Strømmen) |
| 14 | FW | NOR | Mikael Harbosen Haga (to Arendal) |
| 16 | FW | NOR | Martin Hellan (to Brann) |
| 19 | DF | NOR | Kristian Jahr (retired) |
| 24 | MF | NOR | Oliver Banken Sandberg (to Gjøvik-Lyn, previously on loan at Elverum) |
| 26 | FW | NOR | Elias Myrlid (loan return to Brann) |
| 31 | GK | NOR | Andreas Smedplass (to Arendal) |
| 41 | GK | NOR | Mads Edwin Lindegaard (on loan to Fu/Vo) |

=== Levanger ===
In: Note: Flags indicate national team as defined under FIFA eligibility rules; some limited exceptions apply. Players may hold more than one non-FIFA nationality.

| No. | Pos. | Nation | Player |
|---|---|---|---|
| 3 | DF | NOR | William Bjeglerud (from Grorud) |
| 12 | GK | NOR | Morten Sætra (from Strømsgodset) |
| 14 | FW | NOR | Arne Gunnes (from Bryne, previously on loan at Ranheim) |
| 21 | FW | NOR | Herman Stakset (from Brann 2) |
| 32 | DF | NOR | Sander Munkeby Sundnes (from Hødd) |

Out: Note: Flags indicate national team as defined under FIFA eligibility rules; some limited exceptions apply. Players may hold more than one non-FIFA nationality.

| No. | Pos. | Nation | Player |
|---|---|---|---|
| 12 | GK | NOR | Anders Gausen (to Harstad) |
| 14 | FW | NOR | Preben Asp (loan return to Ranheim) |
| 31 | FW | NOR | Sondre Holmen (to Verdal) |
| 32 | MF | NOR | Ingemar Folden Fuglu (to (United States) Menlo Oaks) |

=== Lyn ===
In: Note: Flags indicate national team as defined under FIFA eligibility rules; some limited exceptions apply. Players may hold more than one non-FIFA nationality.

| No. | Pos. | Nation | Player |
|---|---|---|---|
| 2 | DF | NOR | Jonas Skulstad (from (Denmark) AaB) |
| 3 | DF | NOR | Jørgen Vedal Sjøl (from Ørn Horten) |
| 7 | MF | NOR | Henrik Loholt Kristiansen (from Ranheim, previously on loan) |
| 10 | FW | NOR | Mathias Johansen (from Arendal) |
| 15 | DF | NOR | Alexander Rønning-Olsen (from Notodden) |
| 16 | MF | NOR | Adrian Berntsen (from Notodden) |
| 19 | MF | NOR | Tobias Myhre (from Strømmen) |
| 27 | DF | NOR | Isaac Barnet (promoted from junior squad) |

Out: Note: Flags indicate national team as defined under FIFA eligibility rules; some limited exceptions apply. Players may hold more than one non-FIFA nationality.

| No. | Pos. | Nation | Player |
|---|---|---|---|
| 2 | DF | NOR | Rasmus Isegran (released) |
| 3 | DF | NOR | August Randers (to Hønefoss) |
| 10 | FW | NOR | David Tavakoli (released) |
| 11 | MF | NOR | Henrik Elvevold (to Egersund) |
| 15 | DF | NOR | Erlend Sivertsen (to Bærum) |
| 16 | FW | NOR | Ole Breistøl (to (Denmark) ) |
| 51 | MF | NOR | Eskild Braathen Fredriksen (to Asker) |
| 70 | FW | NOR | Markus Ottesen (to Tromsdalen) |
| 88 | DF | NOR | Mikkel Tveiten (retired) |
| 95 | DF | NOR | Anwar Pellegrino (retired) |

=== Mjøndalen ===
In: Note: Flags indicate national team as defined under FIFA eligibility rules; some limited exceptions apply. Players may hold more than one non-FIFA nationality.

| No. | Pos. | Nation | Player |
|---|---|---|---|
| 13 | GK | NOR | Andreas Hippe Fagereng (from Raufoss) |
| 19 | MF | NOR | Erik Næsbak Brenden (from Jerv) |
| 20 | FW | SLE | Alie Conteh (on loan from (Sierra Leone) Goderich) |
| 21 | DF | NOR | Peder Vogt (from Bærum) |
| 23 | DF | NOR | Eivind Helgeland (on loan from Haugesund) |

Out: Note: Flags indicate national team as defined under FIFA eligibility rules; some limited exceptions apply. Players may hold more than one non-FIFA nationality.

| No. | Pos. | Nation | Player |
|---|---|---|---|
| 13 | GK | NOR | Sondre Svanes Strand (on loan to Vard) |
| 19 | MF | NOR | Daniel Skare (to Asker) |
| 21 | DF | NOR | Jesper Bergset Robertsen (loan return to Tromsø) |
| 28 | DF | NOR | Mathias Bauer (released) |
| 31 | MF | SWE | Albin Sporrong (to (Sweden) Östersund, previously on loan) |
| 37 | FW | NOR | Sander Bratvold (on loan to Notodden) |
| 38 | MF | NOR | Sondre Granaas (to Molde) |

=== Moss ===
In: Note: Flags indicate national team as defined under FIFA eligibility rules; some limited exceptions apply. Players may hold more than one non-FIFA nationality.

| No. | Pos. | Nation | Player |
|---|---|---|---|
| 14 | MF | NOR | Altin Lajqi (promoted from junior squad) |
| 15 | MF | NOR | Adan Abadala Hussein (loan return from Tromsdalen) |
| 18 | MF | SOM | Saadiq Elmi (from Grorud) |
| 19 | FW | NOR | Eyþór Björgólfsson (from (United States) Tacoma Defiance) |
| 22 | MF | NOR | Sander Martinsen-Wold (loan return from Sprint-Jeløy) |
| 24 | DF | POR | João Barros (from (Portugal) Gil Vicente) |
| 27 | DF | NOR | Ahmed Jamal Saaty (promoted from junior squad) |

Out: Note: Flags indicate national team as defined under FIFA eligibility rules; some limited exceptions apply. Players may hold more than one non-FIFA nationality.

| No. | Pos. | Nation | Player |
|---|---|---|---|
| 6 | MF | CGO | Kaya Makosso (loan return to (Spain) Vélez) |
| 14 | FW | POR | Cláudio Braga (to Aalesund) |
| 18 | DF | NOR | Leonard Getz (released, previously on loan at Sprint-Jeløy) |
| 9 | MF | NOR | Michael Singh (to Lørenskog) |
| 24 | DF | CZE | Lucas Kubr (loan return to Bodø/Glimt) |
| 27 | DF | NOR | Sivert Haugli (to (United States) One Knoxville) |
| 28 | MF | GHA | Iddriss Mohammed (released) |
| 29 | FW | NOR | Abel William Stensrud (loan return to Odd) |

=== Ranheim ===
In: Note: Flags indicate national team as defined under FIFA eligibility rules; some limited exceptions apply. Players may hold more than one non-FIFA nationality.

| No. | Pos. | Nation | Player |
|---|---|---|---|
| 1 | GK | NOR | Simen Vidtun Nilsen (from Sarpsborg 08) |
| 2 | DF | NOR | Philip Slørdahl (from Lillestrøm) |
| 3 | DF | NOR | Håkon Røsten (on loan from Rosenborg) |
| 7 | MF | NOR | Per Ciljan Skjelbred (from Rosenborg) |
| 8 | MF | NOR | Oliver Holden (from Rosenborg 2, previously on loan) |
| 21 | MF | NOR | Lucas Kolstad (loan return from Tiller) |
| 23 | MF | NOR | Mikael Tørset Johnsen (from Stjørdals-Blink) |
| 27 | FW | DEN | Gustav Mogensen (from Sarpsborg 08) |

Out: Note: Flags indicate national team as defined under FIFA eligibility rules; some limited exceptions apply. Players may hold more than one non-FIFA nationality.

| No. | Pos. | Nation | Player |
|---|---|---|---|
| 1 | GK | NOR | Magnus Lenes (released) |
| 2 | DF | NOR | Christian Eggen Rismark (retired) |
| 3 | DF | NOR | Daniel Kvande (retired) |
| 7 | MF | NOR | Mads Reginiussen (retired) |
| 8 | MF | NOR | Ruben Alte (to Kristiansund) |
| 12 | GK | NOR | Francois Guillemot Venn (to Byåsen) |
| 17 | FW | NOR | Jonas Bolkan Nordli (to Byåsen) |
| 20 | FW | NOR | Arne Gunnes (loan return to Bryne) |
| 21 | MF | NOR | Morten Gamst Pedersen (released) |
| 23 | MF | NOR | Henrik Loholt Kristiansen (to Lyn, previously on loan) |
| – | FW | NOR | Preben Asp (to Grorud, previously on loan at Levanger) |
| – | FW | NOR | Magnus Høiseth (to Egersund, previously on loan) |
| – | DF | NOR | Adrian Bartel (to Stjørdals-Blink, previously on loan) |
| – | MF | NOR | Sevald Andreassen (to Rana, previously on loan) |

=== Raufoss ===
In: Note: Flags indicate national team as defined under FIFA eligibility rules; some limited exceptions apply. Players may hold more than one non-FIFA nationality.

| No. | Pos. | Nation | Player |
|---|---|---|---|
| 4 | MF | NOR | Jan Inge Lynum (from Elverum) |
| 5 | DF | NOR | Oliver Rotihaug (from Bryne) |
| 9 | FW | NOR | Erlend Hustad (from Jerv) |
| 12 | GK | NOR | Petter Eichler Jensen (from Hamkam) |
| 15 | DF | NOR | Kristoffer Hay (from Sandnes Ulf) |
| 17 | MF | NOR | Sander Nordbø (from Notodden) |
| 18 | MF | NOR | Kodjo Somesi (loan return from Gjøvik-Lyn) |
| 21 | DF | GHA | Yaw Agyeman (from (Ghana) Koforidua Semper Fi) |
| 22 | DF | SWE | Victor Fors (from (Sweden) Eskilstuna) |
| 24 | FW | GAM | Kebba Badjie (free transfer) |
| 77 | DM | NOR | Marius Alm (from Hødd) |

Out: Note: Flags indicate national team as defined under FIFA eligibility rules; some limited exceptions apply. Players may hold more than one non-FIFA nationality.

| No. | Pos. | Nation | Player |
|---|---|---|---|
| 4 | DF | NOR | Sivert Westerlund (to Strømsgodset) |
| 5 | DF | NOR | Oscar Kjøge Jansson (loan return to Fredrikstad) |
| 8 | FW | NOR | Markus Johnsgård (to Tromsø) |
| 9 | FW | NOR | Andreas Helmersen (to Egersund) |
| 10 | MF | SUI | Loris Mettler (to Sandefjord) |
| 13 | MF | NOR | Joachim Lundhagebakken (released) |
| 17 | FW | NOR | Håvar Solbakken Befring (to Elverum) |
| 20 | DF | NOR | Gard Simenstad (to Hamkam) |
| 24 | MF | NOR | Hynor Gashnjani (to Gjøvik-Lyn) |
| 26 | FW | NOR | Filip Brattbakk (to (Faroe Islands) 07 Vestur) |
| 27 | DF | NOR | Simen Hagbø (to Levanger) |
| 31 | GK | NOR | Andreas Hippe Fagereng (to Mjøndalen) |
| 36 | GK | NOR | Mathias Søgård Hasle (on loan to Kolbu/KK) |
| – | MF | NOR | Tobias Flem (to Brattvåg, previously on loan) |
| – | FW | FIN | Enoch Banza (to (Finland) KTP, previously on loan at (Finland) JäPS) |

=== Sandnes Ulf ===
In: Note: Flags indicate national team as defined under FIFA eligibility rules; some limited exceptions apply. Players may hold more than one non-FIFA nationality.

| No. | Pos. | Nation | Player |
|---|---|---|---|
| 4 | DF | DEN | Mats Thorsøe Bager (from (Denmark) Skive) |
| 11 | FW | NOR | Jarmund Øyen Kvernstuen (from Ull/Kisa) |
| 14 | FW | NOR | Bård Brandeggen (from Vidar) |
| 17 | DF | NOR | Andreas Rosendal Nyhagen (from Ull/Kisa) |
| 21 | MF | SWE | Haris Brkic (from (Sweden) Trelleborg) |
| 22 | MF | NOR | Vajebah Sakor (from Start) |
| 28 | DF | NOR | Noah Bertelsen (promoted from junior squad) |
| 31 | MF | NOR | Isak Tomar Hjorteseth (on loan from Brann) |

Out: Note: Flags indicate national team as defined under FIFA eligibility rules; some limited exceptions apply. Players may hold more than one non-FIFA nationality.

| No. | Pos. | Nation | Player |
|---|---|---|---|
| 1 | GK | NOR | Aslak Falch (to Haugesund) |
| 4 | DF | NOR | Kristoffer Hay (to Raufoss) |
| 9 | FW | SEN | Mamadou Diaw (loan return to Aalesund) |
| 11 | DF | NOR | Alexander Stølås (retired) |
| 14 | MF | NOR | Fredrik Torsteinbø (retired) |
| 17 | MF | NOR | Ingvald Halgunset (to Egersund) |
| 21 | FW | NOR | Edvin Austbø (loan return to Viking) |
| 22 | MF | NOR | Horenus Tadesse (to Egersund) |
| 29 | FW | NOR | Filip Møller Delaveris (loan return to Brann) |

=== Sogndal ===
In: Note: Flags indicate national team as defined under FIFA eligibility rules; some limited exceptions apply. Players may hold more than one non-FIFA nationality.

| No. | Pos. | Nation | Player |
|---|---|---|---|
| 1 | GK | NOR | Lars Jendal (from Hamkam) |
| 2 | DF | SWE | Felix Eriksson (on loan from (Sweden) IFK Göteborg) |
| 6 | MF | NOR | Martin Høyland (from Sarpsborg 08) |
| 7 | FW | GHA | Edmund Baidoo (from (Ghana) Asanska) |
| 8 | MF | NOR | Jacob Blixt Flaten (from Kjelsås) |
| 9 | FW | SWE | Oliver Hintsa (from (Sweden) Falkenberg) |
| 16 | DF | NGR | Emmanuel Olugbe (on loan from (Nigeria) Hype Buzz) |
| 21 | GK | NOR | Magnus Stær-Jensen (on loan from Vålerenga) |

Out: Note: Flags indicate national team as defined under FIFA eligibility rules; some limited exceptions apply. Players may hold more than one non-FIFA nationality.

| No. | Pos. | Nation | Player |
|---|---|---|---|
| 1 | GK | NED | Renze Fij (released) |
| 3 | DF | NOR | Mansour Gueye (to Jerv) |
| 7 | MF | ISL | Jónatan Ingi Jónsson (to (Iceland) Valur) |
| 8 | MF | ISL | Valdimar Þór Ingimundarson (to (Iceland) Víkingur) |
| 9 | FW | NOR | Endre Kupen (retired) |
| 15 | FW | NOR | Kristoffer Nessø (to Aalesund) |
| 21 | GK | NOR | Jarik Sundling (loan return to Sarpsborg 08) |
| 23 | MF | NOR | Anders Johannessen Nord (to Strømmen) |
| 26 | DF | NOR | Andreas van der Spa (to Sandefjord) |
| 27 | FW | NOR | Sondre Ørjasæter (to Sarpsborg 08) |
| 28 | FW | NOR | Emanuel Grønner (to (North Macedonia) Shkupi) |

=== Stabæk ===
In: Note: Flags indicate national team as defined under FIFA eligibility rules; some limited exceptions apply. Players may hold more than one non-FIFA nationality.

| No. | Pos. | Nation | Player |
|---|---|---|---|
| 1 | GK | NOR | Sondre Rossbach (from Odd) |
| 3 | DF | NOR | Jon Haukvik Øya (from Bærum) |
| 6 | MF | DEN | Magnus Christensen (from Haugesund) |
| 8 | MF | USA | Chris Hegardt (from (United States) Charlotte) |
| 9 | FW | MLI | Bassekou Diabaté (from Jerv) |
| 14 | MF | USA | Thomas Roberts (from (United States) Columbus Crew 2) |
| 17 | MF | NOR | Sebastian Olderheim (promoted from junior squad) |
| 18 | FW | GHA | Abu Bawa (on loan from (Ghana) Attram de Visser) |
| 21 | FW | NOR | Oskar Spiten-Nysæter (promoted from junior squad) |
| 22 | FW | NOR | Kristian Fardal Opseth (from Sarpsborg 08) |
| 27 | MF | NOR | William Wendt (promoted from junior squad) |
| 28 | MF | NOR | Brage Tobiassen (from Ullern) |
| 30 | MF | DEN | Frederik Ellegaard (from (Denmark) Næstved) |

Out: Note: Flags indicate national team as defined under FIFA eligibility rules; some limited exceptions apply. Players may hold more than one non-FIFA nationality.

| No. | Pos. | Nation | Player |
|---|---|---|---|
| 4 | DF | NOR | Simen Wangberg (retired) |
| 5 | DF | NOR | Nicolas Pignatel Jenssen (to Start) |
| 7 | MF | NOR | Fredrik Haugen (to Fana) |
| 8 | MF | ENG | Curtis Edwards (to (England) Woking) |
| 9 | FW | NOR | Mushaga Bakenga (to (Cyprus) Apollon Limassol) |
| 13 | DF | DEN | Thor Lange (to Skeid) |
| 14 | MF | NOR | Fredrik Krogstad (to (Poland) Korona Kielce) |
| 15 | DF | NOR | Sturla Ottesen (to (Netherlands) Cambuur) |
| 16 | FW | DEN | Luca Kjerrumgaard (loan return to (Denmark) OB) |
| 18 | MF | NOR | Gaute Vetti (loan return to Bodø/Glimt) |
| 19 | FW | SWE | Kevin Kabran (to (Romania) Politehnica Iași) |
| 21 | GK | SWE | Isak Pettersson (to (Sweden) Elfsborg) |
| 22 | FW | NOR | Philip Schie (to Ørn Horten) |
| 23 | MF | AUS | Keegan Jelacic (loan return to (Belgium) Gent) |
| 25 | DF | NOR | Filip Møller-Hansen Hornburg (demoted to junior squad) |
| 26 | FW | NGR | Paul Ogunkoya (loan return to (Nigeria) Mahanaim) |
| 33 | DF | GER | Tobias Pachonik (to (Switzerland) Baden) |
| 69 | FW | DEN | Kasper Høgh (to Bodø/Glimt) |

=== Start ===
In: Note: Flags indicate national team as defined under FIFA eligibility rules; some limited exceptions apply. Players may hold more than one non-FIFA nationality.

| No. | Pos. | Nation | Player |
|---|---|---|---|
| 2 | DF | NOR | Fredrik Mani Pålerud (from Sandefjord) |
| 3 | DF | NOR | Altin Ujkani (from Fløy) |
| 4 | DF | NOR | Sivert Sira Hansen (from Mandalskameratene) |
| 5 | DF | NOR | Nicolas Pignatel Jenssen (from Stabæk) |
| 6 | MF | CGO | Kaya Makosso (on loan from (Spain) Vélez) |
| 7 | FW | SWE | Marijan Cosic (from (Sweden) Brommapojkarna) |
| 9 | FW | NOR | Kristoffer Hoven (from (Lithuania) Kauno Žalgiris) |
| 15 | FW | NOR | Marius Nordal (promoted from junior squad) |
| 17 | FW | NOR | Sander Richardsen (promoted from junior squad) |
| 26 | GK | NOR | Mats Viken (from Sandefjord) |

Out: Note: Flags indicate national team as defined under FIFA eligibility rules; some limited exceptions apply. Players may hold more than one non-FIFA nationality.

| No. | Pos. | Nation | Player |
|---|---|---|---|
| 2 | MF | ISL | Bjarni Mark Antonsson (to (Iceland) Valur) |
| 3 | DF | NED | Vito Wormgoor (to (Netherlands) Cambuur) |
| 4 | MF | NOR | Vajebah Sakor (to Sandnes Ulf) |
| 5 | DF | NED | Luc Mares (to Hamkam) |
| 7 | MF | NOR | Emir Derviskadic (to Haugesund) |
| 15 | DF | NOR | Henrik Robstad (to Randesund) |
| 18 | DF | NOR | Jon-Helge Tveita (to Bryne) |
| 20 | MF | NOR | Levi Eftevaag (to Fløy, previously on loan) |
| 22 | FW | FIN | Agon Sadiku (loan return to Rosenborg) |
| 27 | FW | NOR | Sander Svela (on loan to Junkeren, previously on loan at Tromsdalen) |
| 28 | DF | NOR | Rolf Daniel Vikstøl (retired) |
| 40 | MF | NOR | Sindre Osestad (to Fløy) |
| 96 | GK | DEN | Mark Fabricius Jensen (to (Faroe Islands) KÍ) |
| 99 | FW | SWE | Jack Lahne (loan return to (France) Amiens)\ |

=== Vålerenga ===
In: Note: Flags indicate national team as defined under FIFA eligibility rules; some limited exceptions apply. Players may hold more than one non-FIFA nationality.

| No. | Pos. | Nation | Player |
|---|---|---|---|
| 5 | DF | COD | Nathan Fasika (on loan from (South Africa) Cape Town City) |
| 9 | FW | NED | Mees Rijks (from (Netherlands) Jong Utrecht) |
| 14 | FW | NGR | Obasi Onyebuchi (from (Nigeria) Beyond Limits) |
| 19 | FW | NOR | Ola Kamara (from (Sweden) Häcken) |
| 20 | FW | NOR | Lorens Apold-Aasen (promoted from junior squad) |
| 25 | MF | NOR | Jones El-Abdellaoui (loan return from KFUM) |
| 29 | MF | CMR | Brice Ambina (on loan from (South Africa) Cape Town City) |

Out: Note: Flags indicate national team as defined under FIFA eligibility rules; some limited exceptions apply. Players may hold more than one non-FIFA nationality.

| No. | Pos. | Nation | Player |
|---|---|---|---|
| 4 | DF | NOR | Stefan Strandberg (retired) |
| 7 | MF | NOR | Fredrik Oldrup Jensen (to (Netherlands) NAC Breda) |
| 9 | FW | NOR | Torgeir Børven (to Odd) |
| 10 | MF | NOR | Mohamed Ofkir (on loan to (Turkey) Manisa) |
| 13 | GK | NOR | Magnus Stær-Jensen (on loan to Sogndal) |
| 19 | FW | SRB | Andrej Ilić (to (France) Lille) |
| 29 | FW | BRA | Vitinho (loan return to (Brazil) Palmeiras) |
| 33 | DF | ALB | Eneo Bitri (on loan to (Poland) Cracovia) |

=== Åsane ===
In: Note: Flags indicate national team as defined under FIFA eligibility rules; some limited exceptions apply. Players may hold more than one non-FIFA nationality.

| No. | Pos. | Nation | Player |
|---|---|---|---|
| 1 | GK | NOR | Simen Lillevik (from (Iceland) KR) |
| 4 | DF | NOR | Ole Martin Kolskogen (from Aalesund, previously on loan) |
| 5 | MF | NOR | Einar Iversen (free transfer) |
| 10 | MF | NOR | Kristoffer Barmen (from Aalesund, previously on loan) |

Out: Note: Flags indicate national team as defined under FIFA eligibility rules; some limited exceptions apply. Players may hold more than one non-FIFA nationality.

| No. | Pos. | Nation | Player |
|---|---|---|---|
| 4 | DF | NOR | Jonas Eide Vågen (to Lysekloster) |
| 5 | DF | NOR | Sindre Austevoll (to Fotlandsvåg) |
| 22 | DF | NOR | Håkon Sjåtil (to Kristiansund) |
| 28 | FW | SEN | Mame Mor Ndiaye (to KFUM) |
| 29 | DF | NOR | Kristoffer Nesse Stephensen (released) |
| 30 | GK | NOR | Idar Nordby Lysgård (released) |
| 31 | MF | NOR | Isak Tomar Hjorteseth (loan return to Brann) |
| – | MF | NOR | Henrik Gjerde Ødemark (to Fana, previously on loan at Lysekloster) |
| – | FW | NOR | Jacob Jacobsen Bolsø (on loan to Lysekloster, previously on loan at Træff) |
