= 2026 Sandefjord Fotball season =

Sandefjord
2026 season
- Chairman: Gunnar Bjønness
- Head coach: Andreas Tegström
- Stadium: Jotun Arena
- Eliteserien: 7th
- 2026–27 Norwegian Cup: Pre-season
Home colours	Away colours	Third colours

The 2026 season is the 28th season in the history of Sandefjord Fotball and the seventh consecutive season in the Eliteserien. In addition, Sandefjord will participate in the 2026–27 Norwegian Football Cup.

== Transfers ==
=== In ===
Pos.	Player	Transferred to	Fee	Date	Source
DF	(Norway) Håkon Krogelien	(Norway) Jerv	Undisclosed	10 December 2025	
FW	(Sweden) Elias Jemal	(Norway) IK Start	Loan return	31 December 2025	
MF	(Denmark) Jakob Vester	(Denmark) Viborg FF	Undisclosed	31 December 2025	
DF	(Belgium) Xander Lambrix	(Netherlands) TOP Oss	Undisclosed	26 January 2026	
FW	(Sweden) Nikolaj Möller	(Scotland) Dundee United	Undisclosed	12 February 2026	
FW	(Ghana) Foster Apetorgbor	(Ghana) African Viking		11 March 2026	
DF	(Denmark) Gustav Højbjerg	(Denmark) B.93	Undisclosed	30 March 2026	
MF	(Norway) Ruben Alte	(Norway) Viking	Loan	31 March 2026	
DF	(Netherlands) Devon Koswal	(Netherlands) SC Telstar	Free	1 July 2026	

=== Out ===
Pos.	Player	Transferred to	Fee	Date	Source
DF	(Norway) Christopher Cheng	(Poland) Widzew Łódź	€850,000	9 December 2025	
GK	(Finland) Carljohan Eriksson	(Norway) Sarpsborg 08	Loan return	31 December 2025	
MF	(Kosovo) Blerton Issufi	(Norway) Molde	Loan return	31 December 2025	
MF	(Sweden) Filip Ottosson	(Sweden) IFK Göteborg		1 January 2026	
DF	(Norway) Martin Gjone	(Norway) Hamarkameratene	≈ 1.5 million NOK	16 January 2026	
FW	(Sweden) Elias Jemal	(Sweden) IFK Norrköping	Loan	16 January 2026	
DF	(Norway) Aleksander van der Spa	(Norway) Strømsgodset	Undisclosed	1 February 2026	
MF	(Switzerland) Loris Mettler	(Norway) Hamarkameratene	Undisclosed	2 February 2026	
FW	(Iceland) Stefán Ingi Sigurðarson	(Netherlands) Go Ahead Eagles	≈ 34 million NOK	2 February 2026	
MF	(Norway) Jacob Hanstad	(Norway) Stabæk		31 March 2026	
DF	(Sweden) Zinedin Smajlović	(Greece) Olympiacos	≈ 50 million NOK	6 July 2026	

== Pre-season and friendlies ==
16 January 2026	Sandefjord (Norway)	1–0	(Norway) Eik Tønsberg

23 January 2026	Lillestrøm (Norway)	1–2	(Norway) Sandefjord

30 January 2026	Sandefjord (Norway)	2–0	(Norway) Bryne

6 February 2026	Vålerenga (Norway)	5–2	(Norway) Sandefjord

7 February 2026	Sandefjord (Norway)	2–2	(Norway) Skeid

20 February 2026	Sandefjord (Norway)	4–0	(Denmark) AaB Fodbold

26 February 2026	Sandefjord (Norway)	2–1	(Norway) Stabæk

2 March 2026	Sandefjord (Norway)	1–0	(Norway) Ranheim

8 March 2026	Sandefjord (Norway)	3–2	(Norway) Start

27 March 2026	Strømsgodset (Norway)	2–2	(Norway) Sandefjord

== Competitions ==
=== Overall record ===
Competition	First match	Last match	Starting round	Record							
Competition	First match	Last match	Starting round	Pld	W	D	L	GF	GA	GD	Win %
Eliteserien	15 March 2026		Matchday 1	10	4	2	4	9	11	−2	40.00
2026–27 Norwegian Football Cup				0	0	0	0	0	0	+0	—
Total				10	4	2	4	9	11	−2	40.00

Source: Competitions

=== Eliteserien ===
Pos	Team	Pld	W	D	L	GF	GA	GD	Pts
6	HamKam	10	5	2	3	17	16	+1	17
7	Sarpsborg	11	4	2	5	13	16	−3	14
8	Sandefjord	11	4	2	5	10	13	−3	14
9	Vålerenga	11	4	2	5	13	17	−4	14
10	Fredrikstad	11	4	2	5	15	20	−5	14

Updated to match(es) played on 30 May 2026. Source: Football Association of Norway (in Norwegian)
Rules for classification: 1) Points; 2) Goal difference; 3) Goals scored; 4) Head-to-head points; 5) Head-to-head goal difference; 6) Head-to-head goals scored.

==== Results summary ====
Overall								Home						Away					
Pld	W	D	L	GF	GA	GD	Pts	W	D	L	GF	GA	GD	W	D	L	GF	GA	GD
10	4	2	4	9	11	−2	14	2	2	1	4	3	+1	2	0	3	5	8	−3

==== Results by round ====
Round	1	2	3	4	5	6	7	8	9	10	11
Ground	A	H	A	A	H	A	H	H	A	H	A
Result	L	L	W	W	D	L	W	W	L	D	
Position											

Updated to match(es) played on May 2026. Source:
A = Away; H = Home; W = Win; D = Draw; L = Loss

==== Matches ====
The match schedule was issued on 19 December 2025.

15 March 2026 1	Vålerenga	1–0	Sandefjord

22 March 2026 2	Sandefjord	0–2	Sarpsborg 08	Sandefjord
				Stadium: Jotun Arena

7 April 2026 3	KFUM Oslo	1–2	Sandefjord

12 April 2026 4	Brann	0–1	Sandefjord

18 April 2026 5	Sandefjord	0–0	Rosenborg	Sandefjord
				Stadium: Jotun Arena

26 April 2026 6	Tromsø	3–1	Sandefjord

3 May 2026 7	Sandefjord	1–0	Aalesund	Sandefjord
				Stadium: Jotun Arena

10 May 2026 8	Sandefjord	2–0	Kristiansund	Sandefjord
				Stadium: Jotun Arena

16 May 2026 9	Lillestrøm	3–1	Sandefjord

25 May 2026 10	Sandefjord	1–1	Fredrikstad	Sandefjord
				Stadium: Jotun Arena

30 May 2026 11	Molde	v	Sandefjord	Molde
16:00				Stadium: Aker Stadion; Referee: Jørgen Haugen

=== Norwegian Football Cup ===
22–23 August 2026 First round	Eidanger	v	Sandefjord
