= Renate Blindheim =

Norwegian football manager (born 1994)

Personal information
- Full name: Renate Køppen Blindheim
- Date of birth: 17 March 1994 (age 32)
- Position: Midfielder

Team information
- Current team: Sotra (manager)

Youth career
- Sandviken

International career
Years	Team	Apps	(Gls)
2009	Norway U15	2	(0)
2010	Norway U16	1	(0)

Managerial career
- 2020–: Sotra

Renate Køppen Blindheim (born 17 March 1994) is a Norwegian football manager and former footballer who is currently manager of Norwegian 2. divisjon club Sotra. In June 2020, Blindheim gained attention for being the first female manager to manage a professional Norwegian men's football team.

== Early life ==
Blindheim grew up in Bergen and aspired to be a professional footballer from a young age. She represented Norway three times at youth level, featuring alongside future Norway senior international players such as Guro Reiten and Caroline Graham Hansen. Blindheim struggled with injuries and, at the age of 17, retired from football after a serious foot injury. After this, she decided to focus on coaching her younger sister. Her father was a football manager at the time.

== Managerial career ==
Blindheim first worked as a youth coach for Gneist and then later for Olsvik. After her spell at Olsvik, she worked as a player development coach at Åsane. It was during this time that she decided to aspire to be a manager in the Eliteserien, the top tier of Norwegian men's football.

On 19 June 2020, it was announced that Blindheim would be the manager of 2. divisjon club Sotra, meaning that she would be the first female manager to take charge of a professional Norwegian men's football team. The news of her appointment led to significant international media coverage of both her and the club. After six league games, Sotra were undefeated and at the top of the league table with five victories. Following that spell, however, the team's form worsened and they had one draw and seven losses, meaning that they were seventh in the league.
