= Joel Mvuka =

Norwegian footballer (born 2002)

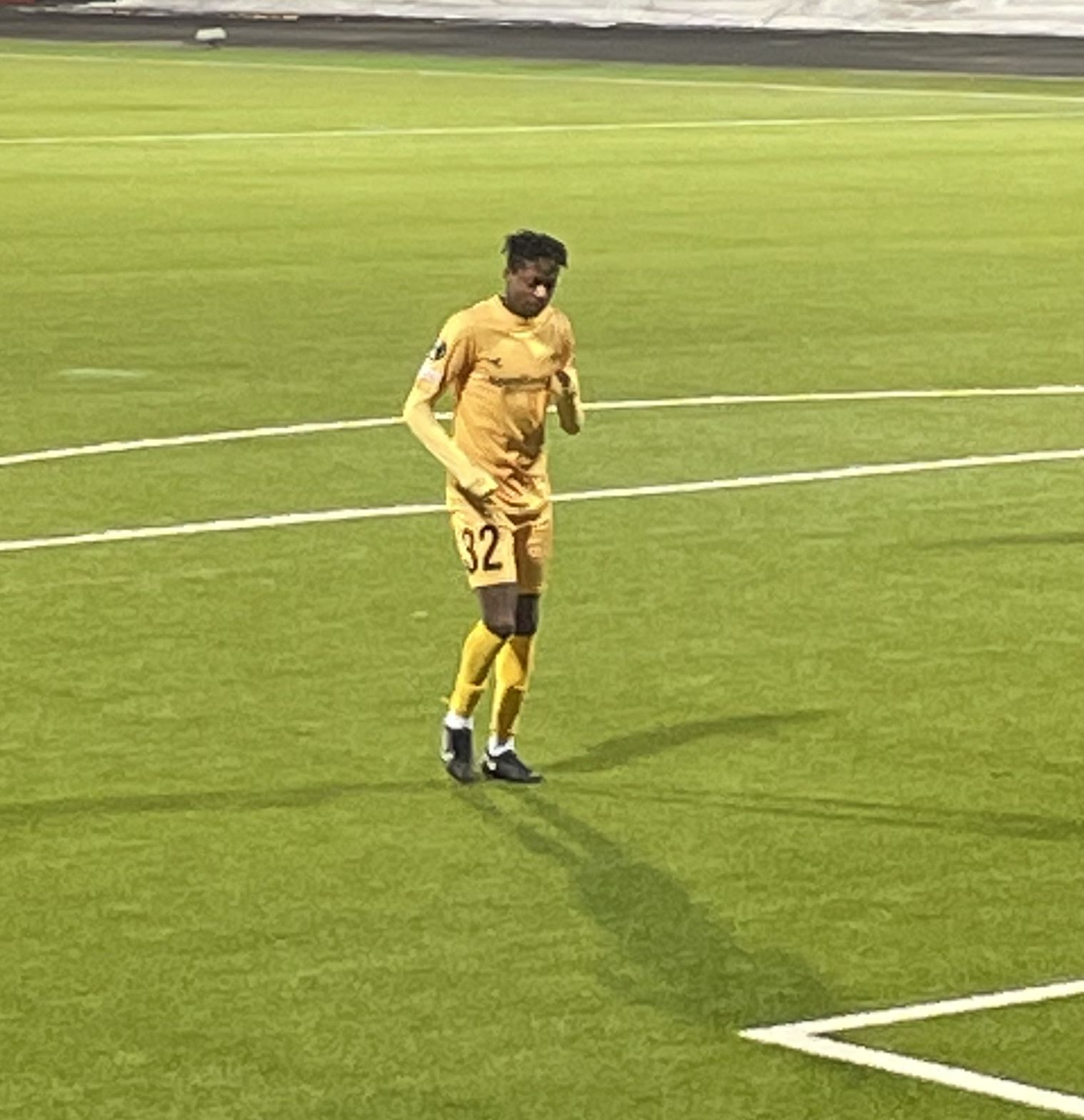
- Mvuka in 2021

Personal information
- Full name: Joel Mugisha Mvuka
- Date of birth: 12 November 2002 (age 24)
- Place of birth: Bergen, Norway
- Height: 1.73 m (5 ft 8 in)
- Position: Forward

Team information
- Current team: Bodø/Glimt
- Number: 22

Youth career
- 2016–2019: Åsane

Senior career*
Years	Team	Apps	(Gls)
2019–2021	Åsane	20	(0)
2021–2023	Bodø/Glimt	34	(2)
2023–2026	Lorient	52	(3)
2023	→ Bodø/Glimt (loan)	12	(3)
2024	→ Young Boys (loan)	16	(2)
2026	→ Celtic (loan)	0	(0)
2026–	Bodø/Glimt	7	(1)

International career
2021	Norway U19	2	(0)
2021–2024	Norway U20	7	(1)
2022–2024	Norway U21	16	(3)
- * Club domestic league appearances and goals as of 20 November 2026

Joel Mugisha Mvuka (born 12 November 2002) is a Norwegian professional footballer who plays as a forward for Norwegian Eliteserien club Bodø/Glimt.

== Club career ==
He spent his youth and senior career in Åsane. In the summer of 2021 Mvuka signed for Bodø/Glimt.

On 31 January 2023, Mvuka signed a four-and-a-half-year contract with the French club Lorient and was loaned back to Bodø/Glimt until the end of the 2022–23 season. He was *Eliteserien Young Player of the Month in May 2023

On 20 January 2024, Mvuka was loaned to Young Boys in Switzerland, with an option to buy.

On 3 February 2026, Mvuka was loaned to Celtic in Scotland on loan for the reminder of the season, with the option to make the transfer permanent.

== Personal life ==
Born in Malawi to Burundian parents. He is also of Rwandan descent. Mvuka had to stop football for eight months as a teenager due to heart irregularities, but returned after he was properly diagnosed. His brother Beltran Mvuka is also a professional footballer.

== Career statistics ==
=== Club ===
As of match played 20 November 2026

Appearances and goals by club, season and competition
Club	Season	League			Cup		Continental		Total	
Club	Season	Division	Apps	Goals	Apps	Goals	Apps	Goals	Apps	Goals
Åsane	2019	2. divisjon	2	0	2	0	—		4	0
Åsane	2020	1. divisjon	6	0	—		—		6	0
Åsane	2021	1. divisjon	12	0	2	0	—		14	0
Åsane	Total		20	0	4	0	—		24	0
Bodø/Glimt	2021	Eliteserien	8	0	1	0	7	0	16	0
Bodø/Glimt	2022	Eliteserien	26	2	3	1	18	1	47	4
Bodø/Glimt (loan)	2023	Eliteserien	12	3	6	1	2	0	20	4
Bodø/Glimt (loan)	Total		46	5	10	2	27	1	83	8
Lorient	2023–24	Ligue 1	7	0	0	0	—		7	0
Lorient	2024–25	Ligue 2	30	3	1	0	—		31	3
Lorient	2025–26	Ligue 1	15	0	2	0	—		17	0
Lorient	Total		52	3	3	0	—		55	3
Young Boys (loan)	2023–24	Swiss Super League	16	2	1	0	2	0	19	2
Celtic	2025–26	Scottish Premiership	0	0	2	0	0	0	2	0
Bodø/Glimt	2026	Eliteserien	7	1	2	3	2	0	11	4
Career total			141	11	22	5	31	1	194	17

== Honours ==
Bodø/Glimt

- Eliteserien: 2021, 2023

Lorient

- Ligue 2: 2024–25
