= Xander Lambrix =

Belgian footballer (born 2000)

Personal information
- Date of birth: 25 March 2000 (age 26)
- Place of birth: Tongeren, Belgium
- Height: 1.81 m (5 ft 11 in)
- Position: Centre-back

Team information
- Current team: Sandefjord
- Number: 44

Youth career
- 2006–2020: Genk

Senior career*
Years	Team	Apps	(Gls)
2020–2023	Roda JC	49	(0)
2023–2026	TOP Oss	93	(1)
2026–	Sandefjord	19	(0)
- * Club domestic league appearances and goals as of 4 September 2026

Xander Lambrix (born 25 March 2000) is a Belgian professional footballer who plays as a centre-back for Eliteserien club Sandefjord.

== Career ==
=== Roda JC ===
Lambrix is a youth academy graduate of Genk. On 16 July 2020, Dutch club Roda JC announced the signing of Lambrix on a two-year deal. He made his professional debut on 30 August 2020 in a 4–0 win against Jong Ajax.

On 23 June 2022, he extended his contract with Roda until 2023. Lambrix left Roda at the end of the 2022–23 season, as his contract was not extended again.

=== TOP Oss ===
On 7 July 2023, Lambrix signed a one-year contract with an option for an additional year with Eerste Divisie club TOP Oss. He made his debut for the club as a starter at centre-back alongside Calvin Mac-Intosch in a 1–0 away defeat against FC Den Bosch on 11 August, the opening matchday of the season.

== Career statistics ==
As of match played 4 September 2026

Appearances and goals by club, season and competition
Club	Season	League			National cup (Note: Includes KNVB Cup, Norwegian Football Cup)		Other		Total	
Club	Season	Division	Apps	Goals	Apps	Goals	Apps	Goals	Apps	Goals
Roda JC	2020–21	Eerste Divisie	21	0	1	0	0	0	22	0
Roda JC	2021–22	Eerste Divisie	4	0	2	0	0	0	6	0
Roda JC	2022–23	Eerste Divisie	24	0	1	0	—		25	0
Roda JC	Total		49	0	4	0	0	0	53	0
TOP Oss	2023–24	Eerste Divisie	37	0	1	0	—		38	0
TOP Oss	2024–25	Eerste Divisie	37	0	1	0	—		35	0
TOP Oss	2025–26	Eerste Divisie	19	1	2	0	—		21	1
TOP Oss	Total		93	1	4	0	0	0	97	1
Sandefjord	2026	Eliteserien	19	0	0	0	—		19	0
Career total			161	1	8	0	0	0	169	1
