= Robin Dzabic =

Swedish footballer (born 2001)

Personal information
- Date of birth: 3 April 2001 (age 25)
- Height: 1.79 m (5 ft 10 in)
- Position: Midfielder

Team information
- Current team: Degerfors
- Number: 23

Youth career
- Älmhults IF
- –2019: IFK Värnamo

Senior career*
Years	Team	Apps	(Gls)
2020–2021	IFK Värnamo	40	(4)
2022–2024	Landskrona BoIS	78	(15)
2025–	Sandefjord	30	(3)
2026–	→ Degerfors (loan)	5	(0)
- * Club domestic league appearances and goals as of 14 August 2026

Robin Dzabic (born 3 April 2001) is a Swedish footballer who plays as a midfielder for Allsvenskan club Degerfors, on loan from Eliteserien club Sandefjord.

== Career ==
Dzabic hails from Älmhult and started his career in Älmhults IF. He played on the junior team of IFK Värnamo before he was drafted into the senior team in 2020. After winning the 2021 Superettan, IFK Värnamo did not bring the player to the Allsvenskan, and instead let him go to second-tier team Landskrona BoIS.

In the summer of 2024, after the closure of the Swedish transfer window but shortly before the Norwegian one closed, the Norwegian club Kristiansund BK placed a bid on Dzabic. In late 2024, Landskrona faced Dzabic' old club Värnamo in the promotion playoff for the 2025 Allsvenskan. Dzabic scored in the first leg, but Värnamo won the second leg and Landskrona were not promoted.

In January 2025, Dzabic was bought by Sandefjord Fotball in Norway for a seven-figure kr sum. In July 2025, he remarkably scored 15 minutes into extra time, giving Sandefjord a 3–2 victory and maintaining their perfect winning streak of 8 home games in the 2025 Eliteserien.

== Personal life ==
Dzabic is of Bosnian descent.

He coached a boys' 16 team in Landskrona.
