= Martin Gjone =

Norwegian footballer (born 2005)

Personal information
- Date of birth: 29 May 2005 (age 21)
- Place of birth: Kvelde, Norway
- Height: 1.90 m (6 ft 3 in)
- Position: Centre-back

Team information
- Current team: HamKam
- Number: 2

Youth career
- –2017: Kvelde
- 2018–2019: Nanset
- 2020–2023: Sandefjord

Senior career*
Years	Team	Apps	(Gls)
2021–2024	Sandefjord 2	50	(11)
2024–2025	Sandefjord	27	(1)
2026–	HamKam	12	(1)

International career^{‡}
2024	Norway U19	1	(0)
2025–	Norway U20	2	(0)
- * Club domestic league appearances and goals as of 23 July 2026 ‡ National team caps and goals as of 14 May 2025

Martin Gjone (born 29 May 2005) is a Norwegian footballer who plays as a centre-back for HamKam.

== Career ==
He grew up in Kvelde and started his youth career there, continuing in Nanset IF. In 2020 he moved on to the U16 team of the region's largest team, Sandefjord Fotball.

He appeared on the bench of the senior team for the first time in 2022, and his debut came in April 2024, starting the match against Lillestrøm.

On 19 October 2024, his would-be first Eliteserien goal against Molde was disallowed, but on 27 October he scored his first Eliteserien goal as Sandefjord recorded a crucial 2–1 victory. He celebrated with a somersault. He was also selected for Norway's youth national team.

At the end of 2024, CIES found Gjone to be the #20 play-building centre-back among teenage players in Europe. In early 2025, TV 2 named Gjone among the ten best teenagers of Eliteserien.

== Career statistics ==
As of 24 November 2025

Appearances and goals by club, season and competition
Club	Season	League			National Cup		Other		Total	
Club	Season	Division	Apps	Goals	Apps	Goals	Apps	Goals	Apps	Goals
Sandefjord 2	2021	4. divisjon	2	0	—		1 (Note: Appearance(s) in 4. divisjon promotional play-offs)	0	3	0
Sandefjord 2	2022	4. divisjon	17	3	—		1	0	18	3
Sandefjord 2	2023	3. divisjon	20	2	—		—		20	2
Sandefjord 2	2024	3. divisjon	7	4	—		—		7	4
Sandefjord 2	2025	3. divisjon	4	2	—		—		4	2
Sandefjord 2	Total		50	11	—		2	0	52	11
Sandefjord	2024	Eliteserien	15	1	1	0	—		16	1
Sandefjord	2025	Eliteserien	12	0	3	2	—		15	2
Sandefjord	Total		27	1	4	2	—		31	3
Career total			77	12	4	2	2	0	83	14
