= Jakob Dunsby =

Norwegian footballer (born 2000)

Personal information
- Full name: Jakob Maslø Dunsby
- Date of birth: 13 March 2000 (age 26)
- Place of birth: Norway
- Height: 1.74 m (5 ft 9 in)
- Position: Right winger

Team information
- Current team: Sandefjord
- Number: 27

Youth career
- –2016: Nøtterøy
- 2016–2019: Sandefjord

Senior career*
Years	Team	Apps	(Gls)
2019	Sandefjord	0	(0)
2019	→ HIFK (loan)	12	(3)
2020	Fram Larvik	11	(3)
2020	→ Egersund (loan)	4	(0)
2021–2022	Egersund	37	(14)
2023–	Sandefjord	98	(14)

International career^{‡}
2019	Norway U19	2	(0)
- * Club domestic league appearances and goals as of 1 November 2026 ‡ National team caps and goals as of 6 September 2024

Jakob Maslø Dunsby (born 13 March 2000) is a Norwegian professional footballer who plays for Sandefjord, as a right winger.

== Career statistics ==
As of 1 November 2026

Appearances and goals by club, season and competition
Club	Season	League			National cup		Total	
Club	Season	Division	Apps	Goals	Apps	Goals	Apps	Goals
HIFK (loan)	2019	Veikkausliiga	12	3	0	0	12	3
Fram Larvik	2020	2. divisjon	11	3	—		11	3
Egersund (loan)	2020	2. divisjon	4	0	—		4	0
Egersund	2021	2. divisjon	17	6	1	0	18	6
Egersund	2022	2. divisjon	20	8	1	0	21	8
Egersund	Total		37	14	2	0	39	14
Sandefjord	2023	Eliteserien	26	3	3	2	29	5
Sandefjord	2024	Eliteserien	26	3	1	0	27	3
Sandefjord	2025	Eliteserien	27	5	3	0	30	5
Sandefjord	2026	Eliteserien	19	3	3	1	22	4
Sandefjord	Total		98	14	10	3	108	17
Career total			162	34	12	3	174	37
