= Isak Tomar Hjorteseth =

Norwegian footballer (born 2004)

Isak Hjorteseth
Personal information
- Full name: Isak Tomar Hjorteseth
- Date of birth: 14 March 2004 (age 22)
- Position: Midfielder

Team information
- Current team: Sotra
- Number: 19

Youth career
- –2016: Mathopen
- 2018–2020: Fyllingsdalen

Senior career*
Years	Team	Apps	(Gls)
2021–2025	Brann	11	(1)
2021	→ Fyllingsdalen (loan)	5	(0)
2023	→ Åsane	12	(1)
2024	→ Sandnes Ulf (loan)	22	(0)
2025–	Sotra	32	(4)

International career^{‡}
2019	Norway U15	7	(0)
2020	Norway U16	3	(0)
2022	Norway U18	6	(0)
2023	Norway U19	4	(0)
2023	Norway U20	2	(0)
- * Club domestic league appearances and goals as of 15 November 2026 ‡ National team caps and goals as of 18 March 2024

Isak Tomar Hjorteseth (born 14 March 2004) is a Norwegian footballer who plays as a midfielder for Sotra.

He started his youth career in Mathopen, where he remained until the club struggled to field a boys' team. Hjorteseth then went on to FK Fyllingsdalen. Hjorteseth made his international youth debut for Norway U15 in 2019.

Ahead of the 2021 season he joined SK Brann together with Fyllingsdalen teammate Niklas Jensen Wassberg. The intention was to loan Hjorteseth back to Fyllingsdalen, which happened in the summer of 2021. He scored his first Brann goal in October 2022, as the club bounced quickly back to Eliteserien after being relegated the year before. Hjorteseth made his Eliteserien debut in April 2023 against Odd. In the summer window of 2023, Hjorteseth was sent on loan to Åsane. After scoring his first goal for Åsane, manager Morten Røssland called Hjorteseth a "gift from God". In 2024, another loan of Hjorteseth was orchestrated, this time to Sandnes Ulf. The intention was to use Hjorteseth as a regular, and make him a "leading star" in the team. Ahead of the 2025 season Hjorteseth left Brann for Sotra.
