= Christopher Cheng =

Norwegian footballer (born 2001)

Personal information
- Date of birth: 27 October 2001 (age 25)
- Place of birth: Oslo, Norway
- Height: 1.72 m (5 ft 8 in)
- Position: Left-back

Team information
- Current team: Widzew Łódź
- Number: 17

Youth career
- –2012: Bærumsløkka
- 2012–2019: Stabæk

Senior career*
Years	Team	Apps	(Gls)
2018–2019	Stabæk 2	43	(5)
2020–2021	Stabæk	0	(0)
2020	→ Notodden	5	(0)
2021	→ Strømmen (loan)	29	(2)
2022	Strømmen	20	(5)
2023	Arendal	24	(4)
2024–2026	Sandefjord	51	(5)
2026–	Widzew Łódź	9	(0)
- * Club domestic league appearances and goals as of 17:19, 29 May 2026 (UTC)

Christopher Cheng (Chinese: 鄭澤彥; born 27 October 2001) is a Norwegian professional footballer who plays as a left-back for Ekstraklasa club Widzew Łódź.

== Career ==
Cheng was a part of Bærumsløkka's youth setup before joining Stabæk in 2012. Graduating through the academy, he signed a professional contract with Stabæk in 2019. He played as a winger at the time. After being promoted to the senior squad in the winter of 2020, Cheng was loaned out to Notodden in the fall. In 2021, he was loaned out to second-tier club Strømmen IF.

In 2022, Cheng was on trial at Bryne FK, but instead joined Strømmen permanently. He was then signed by Arendal Fotball in 2023, and regained motivation he had lost during the Stabæk years. He was also repurposed from winger to left-back. The Eliteserien club Sandefjord Fotball decided to buy the third-tier player ahead of the 2024 season, and he immediately established himself as a starting player.

On 9 December 2025, Cheng signed a contract valid until 2029 with the option of a twelve-month extension with Polish club Widzew Łódź.

== Career statistics ==
As of match played 23 May 2026

Appearances and goals by club, season and competition
Club	Season	League			National cup (Note: Includes Norwegian Cup, Polish Cup)		Total	
Club	Season	Division	Apps	Goals	Apps	Goals	Apps	Goals
Stabæk 2	2018	2. divisjon	23	3	—		23	3
Stabæk 2	2019	3. divisjon	20	2	—		20	2
Stabæk 2	Total		43	5	—		43	5
Notodden (loan)	2020	2. divisjon	5	0	—		5	0
Strømmen (loan)	2021	1. divisjon	29	2	2	0	31	2
Strømmen	2022	2. divisjon	20	5	1	0	21	5
Arendal	2023	2. divisjon	24	4	2	0	26	4
Sandefjord	2024	Eliteserien	24	0	1	0	25	0
Sandefjord	2025	Eliteserien	27	5	2	0	29	5
Sandefjord	Total		51	5	3	0	54	5
Widzew Łódź	2025–26	Ekstraklasa	9	0	1	0	10	0
Career total			181	21	9	0	190	21
