= Marcus Melchior (footballer) =

Norwegian footballer (born 2001)

Personal information
- Date of birth: 9 February 2001 (age 25)
- Height: 1.70 m (5 ft 7 in)
- Position: Midfielder

Team information
- Current team: Sandefjord
- Number: 20

Youth career
- –2014: Frigg
- 2015–2020: Vålerenga

Senior career*
Years	Team	Apps	(Gls)
2018–2020	Vålerenga 2	13	(0)
2021–2023	Skeid	81	(9)
2024–	Sandefjord	25	(2)
- * Club domestic league appearances and goals as of 1 October 2025

Marcus Melchior (born 9 February 2001) is a Norwegian footballer who plays as a midfielder for Sandefjord.

== Career ==
He hails from Uranienborg, Oslo. At the age of 12 he went on trial with AFC Ajax. He played youth football for Frigg until 2015, when he joined the academy of Oslo's largest club Vålerenga. He got the chance to play for their B team, but not their first team and started his senior career in Skeid in 2021.

In 2022 he was named Player of the Year by Skeid's supporter club, Skeidoksene. There was transfer interest from several larger clubs including Viking and Tromsø. The 2023 1. divisjon season became hard for Skeid, ending in relegation. Melchior decided to leave the club. On 3 January he was announced as a new Sandefjord player, praising their style of play.

He soon sustained an injury that ruled him out for parts of 2024. He prolonged his contract to the end of 2027.

== Personal life ==
Melchior is a prominent Jewish family in Norway and Denmark, including several chief rabbis.
