= Simon Amin =

Syrian footballer (born 1997)

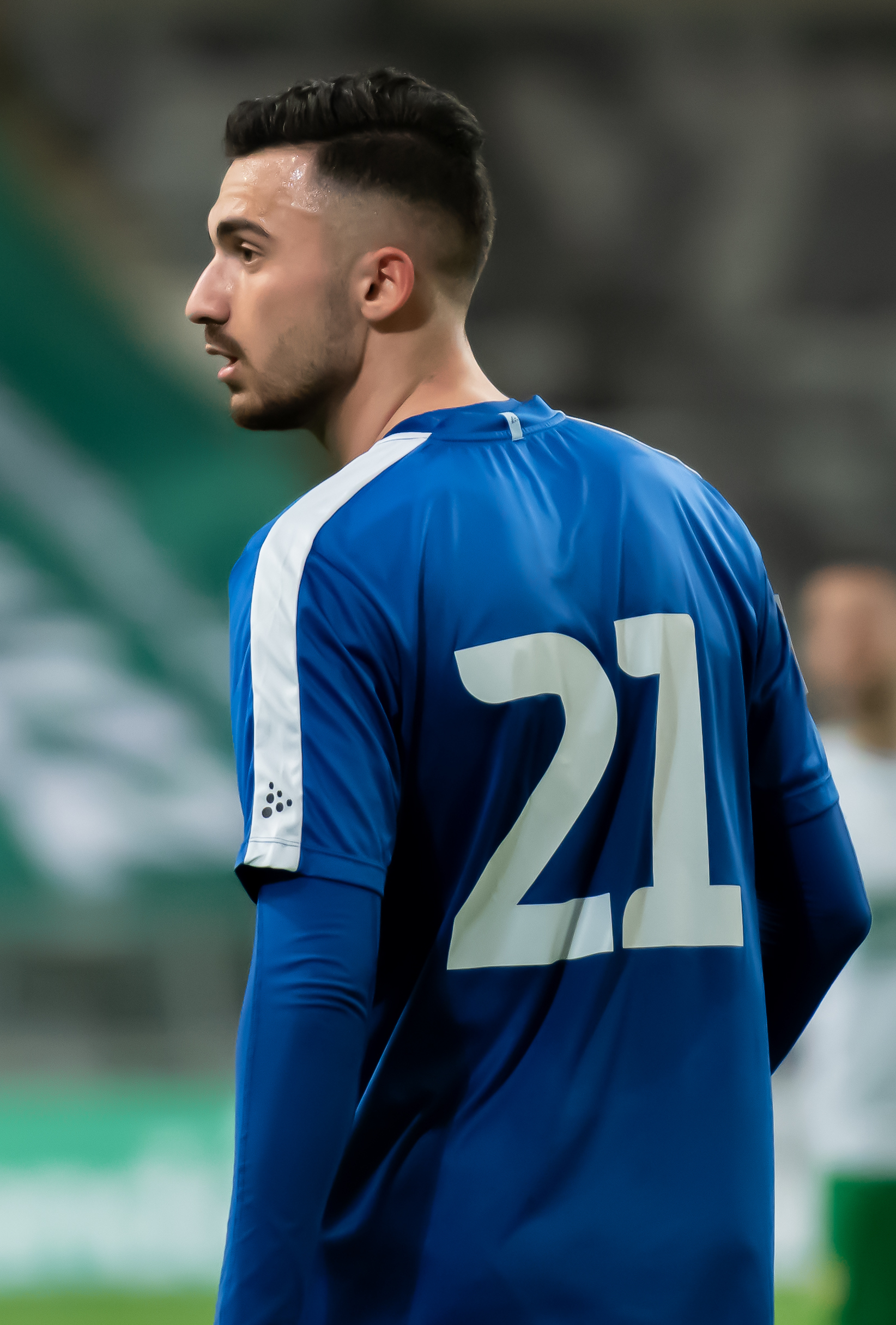
- Amin with Trelleborgs FF in 2021

Personal information
- Full name: Simon Alexander Amin
- Date of birth: 13 November 1997 (age 28)
- Place of birth: Örebro, Sweden
- Height: 1.83 m (6 ft 0 in)
- Position: Midfielder

Team information
- Current team: Al-Mosul
- Number: 8

Youth career
- IFK Hallsberg

Senior career*
Years	Team	Apps	(Gls)
2015–2018	Karlslunds IF	60	(4)
2018–2020	Örebro SK	38	(0)
2021–2022	Trelleborgs FF	2	(0)
2023–2024	Sandefjord	27	(3)
2025	Radnički Niš	6	(0)
2025–2026	Örebro SK	7	(0)
2026–	Al-Mosul	5	(0)

International career^{‡}
2018–2020	Syria U23	5	(0)
2021–	Syria	13	(0)
- * Club domestic league appearances and goals as of 11 March 2026 ‡ National team caps and goals as of 5 June 2026

Simon Alexander Amin (Arabic: سيمون الكساندر أمين; born 13 November 1997) is a professional footballer who plays as a midfielder for Iraqi club Al-Mosul. Born in Sweden, he plays for the Syria national team.

== Club career ==
Amin played for Örebro SK; he was among the candidates for 2020 Allsvenskan midfielder of the year. In January 2023, he left Trelleborgs FF and joined Norwegian club Sandefjord.

== International career ==
Born in Sweden, Amin is of Assyrian descent. He was called up to represent the senior Syria national team for the 2022 FIFA World Cup qualifiers in June 2021.
