= Beltran Mvuka =

Burundian footballer (born 1998)

Personal information
- Full name: Beltran Nishimwe Mvuka
- Date of birth: 4 October 1998 (age 28)
- Place of birth: Burundi
- Height: 1.73 m (5 ft 8 in)
- Position: Winger

Team information
- Current team: Sandviken
- Number: 67

Youth career
- –2016: Åsane
- 2019–2020: Académica de Coimbra

Senior career*
| Years | Team | Apps | (Gls) |
| 2015–2017 | Åsane 2 | 10 | (2) |
| 2018 | Tertnes | 11 | (0) |
| 2018 | → Tertnes 2 | 2 | (1) |
| 2019 | Åsane | 3 | (0) |
| 2019 | → Åsane 2 | 9 | (1) |
| 2021–2023 | Sotra | 65 | (12) |
| 2024–2025 | Sandefjord | 14 | (0) |
| 2025 | Sotra | 8 | (1) |
| 2026 | Lysekloster | 13 | (1) |
| 2026– | Sandviken | 10 | (0) |

International career^{‡}
| 2025– | Burundi | 1 | (0) |
- * Club domestic league appearances and goals as of 15 November 2026 ‡ National team caps and goals as of 25 March 2025

Beltran Nishimwe Mvuka (born 4 October 1998) is a Burundian professional footballer who plays as a winger for Sandviken.

== Early life ==
Mvuka was born on 4 October 1998 in Burundi and is the older brother of Norwegian footballer Joel Mvuka. Moving with his family to Vik Municipality in Sogn og Fjordane, Norway in 2006, they moved again to Bergen in 2010.

== Club career ==
As a youth player, Mvuka joined the youth academy of Norwegian side Åsane Fotball and was promoted to the club's reserve team in 2015. In 2018, he signed for Norwegian side Tertnes IL before returning to Åsane Fotball in 2019.

The same year, he joined the youth academy of Portuguese side Académica de Coimbra. Ahead of the 2021 Norwegian Second Division, he signed for Norwegian side Sotra SK. Subsequently, he signed for Eliteserien side Sandefjord Fotball in 2024.

== International career ==
Mvuka is a Burundi international. During March 2025, he was first called up to the Burundi national football team for 2026 FIFA World Cup qualification.
