= Elias Jemal =

Swedish footballer (born 1998)

Personal information
- Full name: Elias Ezedin Mohamed Jemal
- Date of birth: 3 March 2003 (age 23)
- Position: Winger

Team information
- Current team: IFK Norrköping (on loan from Sandefjord)
- Number: 11

Youth career
- –2017: Hammarby IF
- 2018: Jarlabergs IF
- 2019: IF Brommapojkarna
- 2020: IFK Haninge
- 2021–2022: IF Brommapojkarna

Senior career*
Years	Team	Apps	(Gls)
2022	IF Brommapojkarna	0	(0)
2023–2024	Vasalund IF	43	(12)
2024–	Sandefjord	25	(3)
2025	→ Start (loan)	6	(0)
2026–	→ IFK Norrköping (loan)	30	(10)
- * Club domestic league appearances and goals as of 11 November 2026

Elias Jemal (born 3 March 2003) is a Swedish footballer who plays as a winger for Superettan club IFK Norrköping.

== Career ==
Jemal played for a number of clubs in his youth, including Hammarby IF and Jarlabergs IF before joining IF Brommapojkarna U16 in 2019. He spent the year 2020 in IFK Haninge before returning to Brommapojkarna, where he was promoted to the senior team in the course of 2022.

However, Jemal never played a senior match for Brommapojkarna before being allowed to join third-tier club Vasalund IF in 2023. Successful performances in the 2023 Ettan, including 10 goals, led to interest from IFK Göteborg, who had a transfer bid rejected in February 2024. Instead of playing in a higher Swedish league, he was bought by Norwegian Eliteserien club Sandefjord in July 2024. He first made his mark when scoring the 1–0 goal for Sandefjord against Kristiansund in August, 5 minutes into stoppage time. The victory helped Sandefjord, who struggled against relegation. He also scored against Lillestrøm in November.
