= Stian Kristiansen (footballer) =

Norwegian footballer (born 1999)

Personal information
- Date of birth: 6 January 1999 (age 27)
- Place of birth: Vevelstad, Norway
- Height: 1.88 m (6 ft 2 in)
- Position: Defender

Team information
- Current team: Lillestrøm
- Number: 47

Youth career
- Vevelstad
- Tjalg
- –2014: Brønnøysund

Senior career*
Years	Team	Apps	(Gls)
2014–2015	Brønnøysund	6	(6)
2015–2018	Mosjøen	62	(16)
2021–2023	Junkeren	52	(15)
2023	Bodø/Glimt	0	(0)
2024–2026	Sandefjord	61	(5)
2026–	Lillestrøm	1	(0)
- * Club domestic league appearances and goals as of 31 July 2026

Stian Kristiansen (born 6 January 1999) is a Norwegian footballer who plays as a midfielder for Lillestrøm in Eliteserien.

Hestnes hails from Vevelstad Municipality and played youth football for Vevelstad, Tjalg and Brønnøysund. He also made his senior debut for Brønnøysund before moving to Mosjøen to attend upper secondary school. With this came a transfer to Mosjøen IL, where he experienced relegation from the 2017 3. divisjon. He moved to Bodø to take higher education, which also entailed a transfer to IK Junkeren, though the 2020 season of the lower leagues was cancelled. In 2022 Kristiansen scored 10 league games as Junkeren won promotion to the 2023 2. divisjon. After the 2022 season he went on trial with Sogndal, but stayed in Junkeren.

Playing his first season on the third tier in 2023, several transfer bids were rejected in the first phases of the 2023 summer transfer window. In August, a bid from Åsane was accepted, and then another from Ranheim, with Kristiansen being close to finalizing a transfer to the second tier. However, Junkeren's neighboring club, and dominant Norwegian club in the 2020s, Bodø/Glimt, suddenly entered the process. The move to Bodø/Glimt was confirmed on 16 August, and was regarded as surprising. His unassuming career before suddenly making the leap from the third tier to a club in European competition was described as "the beauty of football".

While Kristiansen only reached as far as being benched for two of Bodø/Glimt's league games and the two 2023–24 UEFA Europa Conference League qualifying phase and play-off games against Sepsi, the fellow first-tier team Sandefjord saw fit to procure Kristiansen ahead of the 2024 season. He made his Eliteserien debut on 1 April 2024 against Rosenborg. He made national headlines when scoring Sandefjord's 2–1 goal in the 3–1 victory over Bodø/Glimt's assumed title contenders, Molde. Eurosport described him as "a very important piece" for Sandefjord. In July he scored a header against Bodø/Glimt as well, with bottom-placed Sandefjord upsetting the reigning champions to win 2–1.

On 19 July 2026, Kristiansen joined Lillestrøm SK on a three-year contract.
