= Darrell Tibell =

Swedish footballer

Personal information
- Full name: Karl Darrell Kamguia Kamdem Tibell
- Date of birth: 20 February 2002 (age 24)
- Place of birth: Umeå, Sweden
- Height: 1.80 m (5 ft 11 in)
- Position: Forward

Team information
- Current team: Hegelmann
- Number: 22

Youth career
- IK Östria Lambohov
- –2021: IFK Norrköping

Senior career*
| Years | Team | Apps | (Gls) |
| 2022–2023 | IFK Norrköping | 3 | (0) |
| 2022 | → IF Sylvia (loan) | 15 | (4) |
| 2023 | → Skövde AIK (loan) | 27 | (3) |
| 2024–2025 | Sandefjord | 13 | (1) |
| 2026– | Hegelmann | 20 | (2) |
- * Club domestic league appearances and goals as of 7 September 2026

Karl Darrell Kamguia Kamdem Tibell (born 20 February 2002) is a Swedish footballer who plays as a forward.

He was born in Umeå and is of Cameroonian descent. Joining IFK Norrköping as a youth player, he was a prolific goalscorer in the national U20 league and was drafted into Norrköping's first team early in the 2022 season. At the same time, he was loaned out to Norrköping's cooperation team IF Sylvia. Spending the season mostly in Sylvia, he also made his Allsvenskan debut in April 2022 against Djurgården. Ahead of the 2023 season, he was on trial with Västerås SK and Icelandic club ÍA, but was loaned out to Superettan team Skövde AIK.

After Skövde struggled during parts of the 2023 Superettan, the form of both the team and Tibell picked up in the late phase of the season. Tibell scored two goals in the playout against Falkenberg, helping Skövde save their Superettan berth. He nonetheless left Norrköping in favour of a move to Norwegian club Sandefjord. He made his Eliteserien debut on 1 April 2024 against Rosenborg.

On 19 February 2026 Lithuanian Hegelmann Club officially announced an agreement with Darrell Tibell.
