= Filip Ottosson =

Swedish footballer

Personal information
- Full name: Karl Filip Ottosson
- Date of birth: 12 September 1996 (age 30)
- Place of birth: Helsingborg, Sweden
- Height: 1.74 m (5 ft 9 in)
- Position: Defensive midfielder

Team information
- Current team: Lillestrøm
- Number: 21

Youth career
- –2013: Eskilsminne IF

Senior career*
Years	Team	Apps	(Gls)
2013–2018	Eskilsminne IF	125	(13)
2019	Västerås SK	13	(0)
2020	Eskilsminne IF	28	(7)
2021–2022	Landskrona BoIS	54	(7)
2023–2025	Sandefjord	89	(4)
2026–	IFK Göteborg	14	(1)
2026–	→ Lillestrøm (loan)	2	(0)
- * Club domestic league appearances and goals as of 19:08, 19 September 2026 (UTC)

Filip Ottosson (born 12 September 1996) is a Swedish footballer who plays as a defensive midfielder for Eliteserien club Lillestrøm, on loan from Allsvenskan club IFK Göteborg.

== Career ==
=== Early career ===
Ottosson started his senior career in Eskilsminne IF in 2013, and was a regular player for several years before joining Västerås SK in 2019. He made his Superettan debut in May 2019, and his first start came in June.

The stay in Västerås was ultimately not successful, but after another year in Eskilsminne he returned to the Superettan in 2021, this time with Landskrona BoIS. Here he established himself as their leader in assists.

=== Sandefjord ===
After two years in Landskrona, Ottosson got the chance in the highest league; not in Sweden, but in Norway's Eliteserien when he was signed by Sandefjord. Ottosson had barely heard about Sandefjord, but was aware of their manager Andreas Tegström. Ottosson instantly became a key player, playing every one of the 2700 minutes in the 2023 Eliteserien. Ahead of the 2024 season he donned the captain's armband. His role in the team was that of ball holder and passer in central midfield.

=== IFK Göteborg ===
On 10 September 2025, Ottosson signed a four-year contract with Allsvenskan club IFK Göteborg, effective from 1 January 2026.

== Personal life ==
He is often nicknamed "Otto" in football squads.
