= Loris Mettler =

Swiss footballer (born 1998)

Personal information
- Date of birth: 14 December 1998 (age 27)
- Place of birth: Chêne-Bougeries, Switzerland
- Height: 1.73 m (5 ft 8 in)
- Position: Midfielder

Team information
- Current team: HamKam
- Number: 10

Youth career
- –2016: Servette

Senior career*
Years	Team	Apps	(Gls)
2016–2017	Étoile Carouge		
2017–2019	Team Vaud	47	(11)
2019–2022	Étoile Carouge	67	(14)
2022–2023	Lleida	10	(0)
2023	Raufoss	29	(7)
2024–2025	Sandefjord	55	(10)
2026–	HamKam	8	(1)
- * Club domestic league appearances and goals as of 23 July 2026

Loris Mettler (born 14 December 1998) is a Swiss professional footballer who plays as a midfielder for HamKam.

== Career ==
Born in Chêne-Bougeries, Mettler is French-speaking and played youth football for Servette FC. He also had spells with Etoile Carouge and Team Vaud as an U21 player, before spending three seasons in the Swiss Promotion League with Étoile-Carouge. Mettler was brought to Lleida CF in the Spanish fourth tier, before going on trial with Norwegian club Raufoss IL in February 2023. He made his debut in a friendly against Strømsgodset, and after spending the first fifteen minutes to adjust, Mettler showed his trademark passing abilities. Mettler was acquainted with one of Raufoss' coaches from their concurrent spell in Servette. The transfer to Raufoss was penned the same month.

In the 2023 Norwegian Football Cup, he among others scored from his own half against Mjøndalen, and scored a panenka penalty kick against Viking. Mettler also performed consistently well in the league. In the fall of 2023, Nettavisen named Mettler as the second best player of the 2023 1. divisjon (only behind Samuel Pedro), describing Mettler as a "cut technician with the ability to open up any defence". He was also included in their Team of the Year. As a result, he was bought by Eliteserien club Sandefjord in 2024. While the fee was not disclosed, director of sports Espen Bugge Pettersen stated that Sandefjord spent most of their transfer budget on Mettler and one other player.

== Personal life ==
Mettler has tattooed disfruta del camino which he describes as his life motto, and uses in goal celebrations. A pre-match ritual is listening to music such as Eminem's "Not Afraid".
