= Sotra SK =

Sports club in Sotra, Norway

- Full name: Sotra Sportsklubb
- Founded: 7 June 1945; 81 years ago, as IL Øygard; 2009; 17 years ago, as Sotra SK
- Ground: Straume Idrettspark
- Chairman: Dan Helge Christensen
- Head coach: Renate Blindheim
- League: 2. divisjon
- 2024: 2. divisjon group 2, 7th of 14
Home colours	Away colours

Sotra Sportsklubb is a Norwegian sports club from Sotra in Øygarden Municipality in Vestland county. Founded as Idrettslaget Øygard on 7 June 1945, the club's current activities consist of athletics, basketball, boxing, football, handball and gymnastics.

== History ==
=== IL Øygard ===
Idrettslaget Øygard was founded 7 June 1945 on the island of Sotra in Fjell Municipality. On 13 June 2007, IL Øygard met Brann in the second round of the 2007 Norwegian Cup. Brann won the game with the score 5–0.

In 2009, IL Øygard merged with Foldnes IL and Brattholmen IL to become Sotra SK. Before the merger, IL Øygard's men's football team played in 3. divisjon (fourth tier), and played their home games at Straume Idrettspark. Their home kits were all-blue and their away kits were all-white.

== Football ==
The men's football team currently plays in 2. divisjon, the third tier of the Norwegian football league system. They promoted from 3. divisjon in the 2018 season. In 2019, Sotra SK's senior football team were offered to join a merger with fellow Øygarden and Sotra clubs Nordre Fjell, Sund SK, Skogsvåg IL, Telavåg IL, Skjergard IL and Nest-Sotra to become a part of the new club Øygarden FK from 2020, but rejected because they wanted to continue on their own.

=== Recent seasons ===
Season		Pos.	Pl.	W	D	L	GS	GA	P	Cup	Notes
2013	3. divisjon	10	24	8	4	12	48	57	28	First round	
2014	3. divisjon	2	26	16	6	4	64	26	54	Second qualifying round	
2015	3. divisjon	2	26	20	5	1	85	15	65	Second qualifying round	
2016	3. divisjon	2	24	16	4	4	66	32	52	First round	
2017	3. divisjon	5	26	12	6	8	57	48	42	First round	
2018	3. divisjon	↑ 1	26	17	5	4	80	32	56	Second round	Promoted to 2. divisjon
2019	2. divisjon	9	26	8	6	12	34	37	30	Second round	
2020	2. divisjon	7	18	6	2	10	21	34	20	Cancelled	
2021	2. divisjon	10	26	10	3	13	41	48	33	First round	
2022	2. divisjon	7	24	8	5	11	46	43	29	Second round	
2022	2. divisjon	3	26	15	5	6	56	29	45	Third round	

== Current squad ==
As of 2 September 2026

Note: Flags indicate national team as defined under FIFA eligibility rules; some limited exceptions apply. Players may hold more than one non-FIFA nationality.

No.	Pos.	Nation	Player
1	GK	NOR	Morten Grasmo
2	DF	NOR	Kristian Ree
3	DF	NOR	Anders Johan Johansen
5	MF	NOR	Ole Martin Dåvøy Skår
6	MF	NOR	Sander Wik
7	FW	NOR	Frederic Falck
8	DF	NOR	Håvard Foldnes
10	FW	NOR	Lars Kilen
11	MF	NOR	Teodor Håland
14	MF	NOR	Markus Fæø

No.	Pos.	Nation	Player
15	FW	NOR	Thorstein Hildal
16	GK	NOR	Ruben Haga Sulen
17	MF	NOR	Mads Aaserud
18	MF	NOR	Jacob Jonassen
19	MF	NOR	Isak Hjorteseth
20	DF	NOR	Daniel Tørum
22	MF	NOR	Magnus Eide Bildøy
23	DF	NOR	Mats Lunde
24	DF	NOR	Erlend Larsen

=== Out on loan ===
Note: Flags indicate national team as defined under FIFA eligibility rules; some limited exceptions apply. Players may hold more than one non-FIFA nationality.

No.	Pos.	Nation	Player

=== Head coaches ===
Sotra SK head coaches from 2017 to present
- (Norway) Tommy Knarvik (January 2017 – December 2019)
- (Norway) Renate Blindheim (June 2020 – present)

== Handball ==
As of the 2019–20 season, the men's handball team plays in the third tier, and the women's team plays in the fifth tier.
