= 2022 Sandefjord Fotball season =

Sandefjord
2022 season
- Chairman: Gunnar Bjønness
- Head coach(es): Hans Erik Ødegaard; Andreas Tegström
- Stadium: Release Arena
- Eliteserien: 14th
- Norwegian Cup: Fourth round
- Top goalscorer: League: Mohamed Ofkir (12); All: Mohamed Ofkir (14)
- Highest home attendance: 6,182 vs Rosenborg (12 August)
- Lowest home attendance: 2,497 vs Kristiansund (27 July)
- Average home league attendance: 3,333 (13 November)
Home colours	Away colours

The 2022 season was Sandefjord's third consecutive year in the top flight now known as Eliteserien, a record in the club's history. They participated in Eliteserien and the Cup. In the end, Sandefjord finished at 14th place but won relegation play-offs against Kongsvinger.

== Squad ==
Note: Flags indicate national team as defined under FIFA eligibility rules; some limited exceptions apply. Players may hold more than one non-FIFA nationality.

No.	Pos.	Nation	Player
1	GK	(Norway) NOR	Jacob Storevik
2	DF	(Norway) NOR	Mats Haakenstad
3	DF	(Netherlands) NED	Quint Jansen
4	DF	(Netherlands) NED	Ian Smeulers
5	DF	(Sweden) SWE	Aleksander Damnjanovic Nilsson
6	MF	(Norway) NOR	Sander Risan Mørk
7	FW	(Norway) NOR	Mohamed Ofkir
8	MF	(Sweden) SWE	William Kurtovic (3rd captain)
9	FW	(Norway) NOR	Sivert Gussiås
10	FW	(Costa Rica) CRC	Deyver Vega
11	FW	(Norway) NOR	Youssef Chaib
12	GK	(Finland) FIN	Hugo Keto
13	DF	(Norway) NOR	Lars Markmanrud
14	FW	(Norway) NOR	Alexander Ruud Tveter
15	DF	(Norway) NOR	Jesper Taaje

No.	Pos.	Nation	Player
17	DF	(Norway) NOR	Sander Moen Foss (vice-captain)
18	DF	(Norway) NOR	Fredrik Mani Pålerud
19	MF	(Bosnia and Herzegovina) BIH	Amer Ordagić
20	FW	(Norway) NOR	Franklin Nyenetue
21	DF	(Norway) NOR	Fredrik Flo
22	MF	(Equatorial Guinea) EQG	Federico Bikoro
23	MF	(South Africa) RSA	Keanin Ayer
24	MF	(Norway) NOR	Harmeet Singh (captain)
25	MF	(Norway) NOR	Vetle Walle Egeli
26	MF	(Norway) NOR	Filip Loftesnes-Bjune
27	MF	(Sweden) SWE	Albin Winbo (on loan from Varbergs BoIS)
28	MF	(Spain) ESP	Rufo
29	FW	(Norway) NOR	Wally Njie
36	FW	(Norway) NOR	Sebastian Mathisen
54	GK	(Norway) NOR	Andreas Albertsen

=== Out on loan ===
Note: Flags indicate national team as defined under FIFA eligibility rules; some limited exceptions apply. Players may hold more than one non-FIFA nationality.

No.	Pos.	Nation	Player

== Transfers ==
=== Winter ===
In: Note: Flags indicate national team as defined under FIFA eligibility rules; some limited exceptions apply. Players may hold more than one non-FIFA nationality.

No.	Pos.	Nation	Player
3	DF	(Netherlands) NED	Quint Jansen (from (Norway) Aalesund)
5	MF	(Sweden) SWE	Aleksander Damnjanovic Nilsson (from (Sweden) Malmö on loan)
7	FW	(Norway) NOR	Mohamed Ofkir (from (Norway) Sarpsborg 08)
11	FW	(Norway) NOR	Youssef Chaib (from (Norway) Strømmen)
12	GK	(Finland) FIN	Hugo Keto (from (Finland) HJK Helsinki)
15	DF	(Norway) NOR	Jesper Taaje (from (Norway) KFUM)
21	DF	(Norway) NOR	Philip Slørdahl (from (Norway) Lillestrøm on loan)
23	MF	(South Africa) RSA	Keanin Ayer (from (Sweden) Varbergs BoIS)

Out: Note: Flags indicate national team as defined under FIFA eligibility rules; some limited exceptions apply. Players may hold more than one non-FIFA nationality.

No.	Pos.	Nation	Player
2	DF	(Norway) NOR	Brice Wembangomo (Released, to (Norway) Bodø/Glimt)
3	DF	(Andorra) AND	Marc Vales (to (Malaysia) Kedah Darul Aman)
5	DF	(Austria) AUT	Martin Kreuzriegler (Released, to (Poland) Widzew Łódź)
8	MF	(Brazil) BRA	Zé Eduardo (Released)
11	MF	(Norway) NOR	Kristoffer Normann Hansen (Released, to (Poland) Widzew Łódź)
15	MF	(Norway) NOR	Erik Brenden (Released, to (Norway) Jerv)
21	MF	(Norway) NOR	Peder Meen Johansen (to (Norway) Grorud)
22	MF	(Norway) NOR	Moussa Njie (Released, to (Norway) KFUM)
23	MF	(Iceland) ISL	Viðar Ari Jónsson (Released, to (Hungary) Budapest Honvéd)
25	DF	(Norway) NOR	Henrik Falchener (Released, to (Norway) Ørn Horten)
54	GK	(Norway) NOR	Andreas Albertesen (on loan to (Norway) Halsen)
93	FW	(Norway) NOR	Chuma Anene (Released, to (Cyprus) Omonia Aradippou)
99	GK	(Norway) NOR	Jesper Granlund (Released)
–	DF	(Norway) NOR	Herman Solberg Nilsen (Released, to (Norway) Lyn)

=== Summer ===
In: Note: Flags indicate national team as defined under FIFA eligibility rules; some limited exceptions apply. Players may hold more than one non-FIFA nationality.

No.	Pos.	Nation	Player
5	MF	(Sweden) SWE	Aleksander Damnjanovic Nilsson (from (Sweden) Malmö, previously on loan)
18	DF	(Norway) NOR	Fredrik Pålerud (from (Norway) Sandnes Ulf)
21	DF	(Norway) NOR	Fredrik Flo (from (Norway) Øygarden)
22	MF	(Equatorial Guinea) EQG	Federico Bikoro (from (Spain) Real Zaragoza)
27	MF	(Sweden) SWE	Albin Winbo (on loan from (Sweden) Varbergs BoIS)
28	MF	(Spain) ESP	Rufo (from (Denmark) AaB)
29	FW	(Norway) NOR	Wally Njie (from (Norway) Flint)
54	GK	(Norway) NOR	Andreas Albertesen (loan return from (Norway) Halsen)

Out: Note: Flags indicate national team as defined under FIFA eligibility rules; some limited exceptions apply. Players may hold more than one non-FIFA nationality.

No.	Pos.	Nation	Player
21	DF	(Norway) NOR	Philip Slørdahl (loan return to (Norway) Lillestrøm)

== Friendlies ==
5 February 2022	Sandefjord (Norway)	3–0	(Norway) Fram Larvik	Sandefjord
13:00 UTC (UTC+1)	S. Walle Egeli 60'; Ruud Tveter 66'; Chaib 68'			Stadium: Gamle Stadion

6 February 2022	Sandefjord (Norway)	2–0	(Norway) Skeid	Sandefjord
14:05 UTC (UTC+1)	Vega 20'; Nyenetue 29'			Stadium: Gamle Stadion

12 February 2022	Sandefjord (Norway)	4–1	(Norway) Jerv	Sandefjord
14:00 UTC (UTC+1)	Risan 19'; Nyenetue 21', 48'; Taaje 67'		Furtado 32' (pen.)	Stadium: Gamle Stadion

18 February 2022	Sandefjord (Norway)	3–2	(Norway) Mjøndalen	Sandefjord
13:00 UTC (UTC+1)	Taaje 12'; Nyenetue 52'; Ruud Tveter 65'		Engh Øverby 45'; Winth 81'	Stadium: Gamle Stadion

28 February 2022	Riga FC (Latvia)	1–1	(Norway) Sandefjord	Belek, Turkey
13:00 UTC (UTC+3)	Loukili 89'		Kurtovic 23'; Singh (yellow card) 38' (yellow-red card) 40'	Stadium: Regnum Carya Field

6 March 2022	HJK Helsinki (Finland)	1–2	(Norway) Sandefjord	Manavgat, Turkey
15:00 UTC (UTC+3)	Radulović 62'		Ruud Tveter 44'; Nyenetue 89'	Stadium: Emir Hotels Sports Complex

19 March 2022	Sandefjord (Norway)	1–3	(Norway) Stabæk	Sandefjord
14:00 UTC (UTC+1)	Gussiås 28'		Geelmuyden 10'; Normann Hansen 19'; Edvardsen 34'	Stadium: Gamle Stadion

26 March 2022	Odd (Norway)	2–0	(Norway) Sandefjord	Skien
16:00 UTC (UTC+1)	Lauritsen 37'; Moen Foss 67' (o.g.)			Stadium: Skagerak Arena

== Competitions ==
=== Eliteserien ===
==== Results summary ====
Overall								Home						Away					
Pld	W	D	L	GF	GA	GD	Pts	W	D	L	GF	GA	GD	W	D	L	GF	GA	GD
30	6	6	18	42	68	−26	24	1	6	8	23	35	−12	5	0	10	19	33	−14

Last updated: 7 March 2023.
Source: see below

==== Results by round ====
Round	1	2	3	4	5	6	7	8	9	10	11	12	13	14	15	16	17	18	19	20	21	22	23	24	25	26	27	28	29	30
Ground	A	H	A	A	H	A	H	A	A	H	A	H	A	H	H	A	H	H	A	H	A	H	A	H	A	H	A	H	A	H
Result	W	L	L	W	L	L	L	W	W	W	D	L	D	W	L	L	D	L	L	D	L	L	L	D	L	L	L	L	L	D
Position	1	6	12	7	10	13	14	12	9	8	8	11	11	7	8	10	8	10	12	13	14	14	14	14	14	14	14	14	14	14

Updated to match(es) played on 14 June 2022. Source: see below
A = Away; H = Home; W = Win; D = Draw; L = Loss

==== Results ====
3 April 2022 1	Haugesund	1–3	Sandefjord	Haugesund
18:00 CEST (UTC+2)	Therkildsen (yellow card) 57'; Gong 74'	Report	Ruud Tveter 12', 26', 41'; Smeulers (yellow card) 33'; Kurtovic (yellow card) 76'	Stadium: Haugesund Sparebank Arena; Attendance: 3,187; Referee: Sivert Amland

9 April 2022 2	Sandefjord	1–2	Bodø/Glimt	Sandefjord
18:00 CEST (UTC+2)	Vega 68' (yellow card) 68'; Singh (yellow card) 89'	Report	Boniface 14'; Saltnes 76'	Stadium: Release Arena; Attendance: 4,306; Referee: Kai Erik Steen

18 April 2022 3	HamKam	3–0	Sandefjord	Hamar
18:00 CEST (UTC+2)	Enkerud (yellow card) 9' (goal) 80'; Kirkevold (yellow card) 28'; Kongsro 41'; Kurucay 76'	Report	Damnjanovic Nilsson (yellow card) 14'; Walle Egeli (yellow card) 84'	Stadium: Briskeby Arena; Attendance: 3,597; Referee: Svein Tore Sinnes

23 April 2022 4	Strømsgodset	0–5	Sandefjord	Drammen
18:00 CEST (UTC+2)		Report	Ofkir 14', 70', 79'; Nyenetue (yellow card) 32' (goal) 40', 62'	Stadium: Marienlyst Stadion; Attendance: 4,401; Referee: Svein Oddvar Moen

8 May 2022 5	Sandefjord	1–3	Vålerenga	Sandefjord
18:00 CEST (UTC+2)	Risan Mørk (yellow card) 18'; Kurtovic (yellow card) 45'; Haakenstad (yellow card) 66'; Ruud Tveter 73'	Report	Taaje 8' (o.g.); Dønnum 31'; Kjartansson 50'; Christensen (yellow card) 82'	Stadium: Release Arena; Attendance: 4,058; Referee: Tore Hansen

16 May 2022 6	Rosenborg	3–0	Sandefjord	Trondheim
18:00 CEST (UTC+2)	Vecchia 7' 65' (pen.); Tagseth 58'	Report	Kurtovic (yellow card) 64'	Stadium: Lerkendal Stadion; Attendance: 20,149; Referee: Rohit Saggi

21 May 2022 7	Sandefjord	1–4	Lillestrøm	Sandefjord
16:00 CEST (UTC+2)	Taaje 3'; Damnjanovic Nilsson (yellow card) 72'	Report	Slørdahl 7' (o.g.); Storevik 25' (o.g.); Ogbu 43'; Adams 58'; Garnås (yellow card) 78'	Stadium: Release Arena; Attendance: 3,290; Referee: Daniel Higraff

25 May 2022 8	Odd	0–1	Sandefjord	Skien
18:00 CEST (UTC+2)	Wallem (yellow card) 44'	Report	Ayer 15'; Taaje (yellow card) 54'; Singh (yellow card) 54'; Ofkir (yellow card) 68'; Gussiås (yellow card) 90'	Stadium: Skagerak Arena; Attendance: 3,907; Referee: Kristoffer Hagenes

19 June 2022 10	Viking	1–2	Sandefjord	Stavanger
18:00 CEST (UTC+2)	Løkberg 43'	Report	Taaje (yellow card) 32'; Nilsson (yellow card) 56'; Ofkir 60'; Tveter 70'	Stadium: SR-Bank Arena; Attendance: 9,086; Referee: Svein Oddvar Moen

26 June 2022 11	Sandefjord	2–2	Tromsø	Sandefjord
18:00 CEST (UTC+2)	Kurtovic 41'; Ofkir 51'	Report	Vesterlund 48'; Nilsen (yellow card) 52'; Opsahl (yellow card) 57'; Kamanzi 81'	Stadium: Release Arena; Attendance: 2,706; Referee: Svein Tore Sinnes

3 July 2022 12	Sarpsborg 08	4–3	Sandefjord	Sarpsborg
18:00 CEST (UTC+2)	Maigaard 8', 19'; Nilsen (red card) 39'; Salétros 54' (o.g.); Ngouali 70'	Report	Ruud Tveter 21'; Vega 44'; Ofkir 73'; Ayer (yellow card) 77'; Smeulers (yellow card) 90+4'	Stadium: Sarpsborg Stadion; Attendance: 4,094; Referee: Mohammad Usman Aslam

10 July 2022 13	Sandefjord	2–2	Aalesund	Sandefjord
18:00 CEST (UTC+2)	Haakenstad 4'; Ofkir 65'; Taaje (yellow card) 76'	Report	Rafn (yellow card) 35'; Nenass 39'; Čanađija 49'; Golubović (yellow card) 84'	Stadium: Release Arena; Attendance: 2,643; Referee: Ola Hobber Nilsen

16 July 2022 14	Jerv	1–2	Sandefjord	Grimstad
16:00 CEST (UTC+2)	Diallo 51'	Report	Markmanrud 55' (yellow card) 90+2'; Jansen 78'	Stadium: J.J. Ugland Stadion – Levermyr; Attendance: 2,512; Referee: Tom Harald Hagen

24 July 2022 15	Sandefjord	2–3	Molde	Sandefjord
18:00 CEST (UTC+2)	Haugan 35' (o.g.); Haakenstad 77'	Report	Linnes 44'; Kaasa 49'; Brynhildsen 84'	Stadium: Release Arena; Attendance: 2,980; Referee: Espen Eskås

27 July 2022 9	Sandefjord	2–0	Kristiansund	Sandefjord
18:00 CEST (UTC+2)	Ofkir 39'; Ayer 83'	Report	Nilsen (yellow card) 32'; Agbo (yellow card) 90+3'	Stadium: Release Arena; Attendance: 2,497; Referee: Svein Oddvar Moen

30 July 2022 16	Tromsø	3–0	Sandefjord	Tromsø
18:00 CEST (UTC+2)	Kitolano 9', 49'; Mikkelsen 14' (o.g.)	Report	Markmanrud (yellow card) 76'	Stadium: Alfheim Stadion; Attendance: 2,020; Referee: Sivert Amland

7 August 2022 17	Sandefjord	2–2	Viking	Sandefjord
18:00 CEST (UTC+2)	Ofkir 9'; Chaib 21' (yellow card) 81'	Report	Løkberg (yellow card) 39'; Kabran 62'; Haugen 86'	Stadium: Release Arena; Attendance: 2,913; Referee: Marius Lien

14 August 2022 18	Sandefjord	2–5	Rosenborg	Sandefjord
18:00 CEST (UTC+2)	Ofkir 6'; Keto (yellow card) 8'; Ruud Tveter 15'; Smeulers (yellow card) 86'; Taaje (red card) 90'	Report	Sæter 8' (pen.); Tengstedt 14', 62', 67'; Hansen (yellow card) 72'; Fiabema 90+2'	Stadium: Release Arena; Attendance: 6,182; Referee: Daniel Higraff

21 August 2022 19	Lillestrøm	3–0	Sandefjord	Lillestrøm
18:00 CEST (UTC+2)	Mathew (yellow card) 17'; Åsen 26'; Kairinen 52'; Dragsnes 68'	Report	Ordagić (yellow card) 54'; Winbo (yellow card) 76'	Stadium: Åråsen Stadion; Attendance: 5,308; Referee: Svein Tore Sinnes

28 August 2022 20	Sandefjord	2–2	Strømsgodset	Sandefjord
18:00 CEST (UTC+2)	Smeulers (yellow card) 43'; Ruud Tveter 68'; Vega (yellow card) 74'; Taaje 80'; Ofkir (yellow card) 90'	Report	Friday (yellow card) 32'; Gulliksen (yellow card) 42'; Gunnarsson (yellow card) 44'; Hove 61'; Stengel 90+1'	Stadium: Release Arena; Attendance: 2,732; Referee: Espen Eskås

4 September 2022 21	Kristiansund	3–1	Sandefjord	Kristiansund
18:00 CEST (UTC+2)	Moumbagna 38' (pen.); Willumsson 45+2'; Gjesdal (yellow card) 68'; Kalludra 86' (yellow card) 86'	Report	Ofkir (yellow card) 50'; Kurtovic (yellow card) 77'; Ayer 83'	Stadium: Kristiansund Stadion; Attendance: 3,410; Referee: Christian Moen

11 September 2022 22	Sandefjord	1–3	Odd	Sandefjord
18:00 CEST (UTC+2)	Flo 27'; Haakenstad (yellow card) 69'; Ayer (yellow card) 74'	Report	Owusu 38'; Gjengaar (yellow card) 44' (goal) 48', 52'; Ruud (yellow card) 65'	Stadium: Release Arena; Attendance: 2,744; Referee: Rohit Saggi

18 September 2022 23	Vålerenga	4–0	Sandefjord	Oslo
18:00 CEST (UTC+2)	Christensen (yellow card) 32' (goal) 79'; Layouni 36', 45+2'; Eng 84'	Report	Winbo (yellow card) 81'	Stadium: Intility Arena; Attendance: 9,252; Referee: [Mohammad Usman Aslam

2 October 2022 24	Sandefjord	1–1	Sarpsborg 08	Sandefjord
17:00 CEST (UTC+2)	Ofkir 44'; Vega (yellow card) 53'; Jansen (yellow card) 87'	Report	Torp (yellow card) 29'; Tibbling (yellow card) 72'; Engvall 78'	Stadium: Release Arena; Attendance: 3,283; Referee: Tom Harald Hagen

9 October 2022 25	Bodø/Glimt	4–1	Sandefjord	Bodø
17:00 CEST (UTC+2)	Grønbæk (yellow card) 38'; Vetlsen 54', 82'; Wembangomo 58'; Pellegrino 74'	Report	Ordagić (yellow card) 42'; Jansen 45+1'; Rufo (yellow card) 62'; Kurtovic (yellow card) 69'	Stadium: Aspmyra Stadion; Attendance: 6,002; Referee: Sivert Amland

16 October 2022 26	Sandefjord	1–2	Jerv	Sandefjord
17:00 CEST (UTC+2)	Ofkir 68'; Smeulers (yellow card) 77'; Winbo (yellow card) 90+5'	Report	Diallo 1'; Brenden 8'; Kolskogen (yellow card) 37'; Cijntje (yellow card) 90+1'	Stadium: Release Arena; Attendance: 2,513; Referee: Kristoffer Hagenes

23 October 2022 27	Aalesund	1–0	Sandefjord	Ålesund
17:00 CEST (UTC+2)	Čanađija (yellow card) 58'; Koomson 73'	Report	Rufo (yellow card) 42'	Stadium: Color Line Stadion; Attendance: 4,194; Referee: Espen Eskås

30 October 2022 28	Sandefjord	1–2	HamKam	Sandefjord
17:00 CET (UTC+1)	Rufo 50'	Report	Sjølstad 25' (yellow card) 55'; Kirkevold 60'; Jendal (yellow card) 90+3'	Stadium: Release Arena; Attendance: 2,744; Referee: Rohit Saggi

6 November 2022 29	Molde	2–1	Sandefjord	Molde
17:00 CET (UTC+1)	Fofana 26' (pen.); Eikrem 65'	Report	Taaje (yellow card) 25'; Winbo 63'; Singh (yellow card) 84'; Bikoro (yellow card) 90+1'	Stadium: Aker Stadion; Attendance: 7,306; Referee: Mohammad Usman Aslam

13 November 2022 30	Sandefjord	2–2	Haugesund	Sandefjord
17:00 CET (UTC+1)	Vega (yellow card) 60'; Ofkir (yellow card) 77'; Singh 89'; Kurtovic 90+1'; Gussiås (yellow card) 90+5'	Report	Zafeiris (yellow card) 17' (goal) 24'; Eskesen 20'	Stadium: Release Arena; Attendance: 4,404; Referee: Tom Harald Hagen

==== Table ====
Pos	Team	Pld	W	D	L	GF	GA	GD	Pts	Qualification or relegation
12	Strømsgodset	30	9	6	15	44	55	−11	33	
13	HamKam	30	6	13	11	33	43	−10	31	
14	Sandefjord (O)	30	6	6	18	42	68	−26	24	Qualification for the relegation play-offs
15	Kristiansund (R)	30	5	8	17	37	60	−23	23	Relegation to First Division
16	Jerv (R)	30	5	5	20	30	69	−39	20	Relegation to First Division

Source: Football Association of Norway (in Norwegian)
Rules for classification: 1) Points; 2) Goal difference; 3) Goals scored; 4) Head-to-head points; 5) Head-to-head goal difference; 6) Head-to-head goals scored.
(O) Play-off winners; (R) Relegated

==== Relegation play-offs ====
The 14th-placed team in Eliteserien will face the winners of the First Division promotion play-offs over two legs to decide who will play in Eliteserien next season.

16 November 2022 First leg	Sandefjord	4–0	Kongsvinger	Sandefjord
18:00 CET (UTC+1)	Ofkir 3'; Winbo 42'; Tveter 54'; Kurtovic 78'	Report		Stadium: Sandefjord Arena; Attendance: 5,020; Referee: Kai Erik Steen

19 November 2022 Second leg	Kongsvinger	2–1 (2–5 agg.)	Sandefjord	Kongsvinger
16:00 CET (UTC+1)	Langrekken 49'; Holter 79'	Report	Nyenetue 31'	Stadium: Gjemselund Stadion; Attendance: 1,882; Referee: Tore Hansen

=== Norwegian Cup ===
4 May 2022 First Round	Halsen	1–4	Sandefjord	Larvik
18:00 CEST (UTC+2)	Istre 23'; Bach Røsholt (yellow card) 83'	Report	Chaib 8'; Loftesnes-Bjune 27'; Jansen 70'; Gussiås 74'	Stadium: Bergeskogen Idrettspark; Attendance: 450; Referee: Anders Bodding

22 June 2022 Second Round	Flint	1–5	Sandefjord	Tønsberg
18:00 CEST (UTC+2)	Njie 71'	Report	Walle Egeli 9'; Vega 12'; Nyenetue 20'; Ayer 73'; Ofkir 76'	Stadium: Flint Esso Arena; Attendance: 1012; Referee: Ole-Alexander Ekeli Valen

29 June 2022 Third Round	Byåsen	1–2	Sandefjord	Trondheim
18:00 CEST (UTC+2)	Lian Horten 62'	Report	Kleppe Halgunset 25' (o.g.); Ofkir 68'	Stadium: Byåsen Arena; Attendance: 344; Referee: Marius Hansen Grøtta

Fourth round took place during the 2023 season.

== Squad statistics ==
As of match played 12 April 2022

=== Appearances and goals ===
No.	Pos	Nat	Player	Total		Eliteserien		Norwegian Cup	
No.	Pos	Nat	Player	Apps	Goals	Apps	Goals	Apps	Goals
1	GK	(Norway) NOR	Jacob Storevik	20	0	20	0	0	0
2	DF	(Norway) NOR	Mats Haakenstad	22	2	19+3	2	0	0
3	DF	(Netherlands) NED	Quint Jansen	26	3	20+4	2	1+1	1
4	DF	(Netherlands) NED	Ian Smeulers	32	0	28	0	0+4	0
5	MF	(Sweden) SWE	Aleksander Damnjanovic Nilsson	20	0	15	0	1+4	0
6	MF	(Norway) NOR	Sander Risan Mørk	6	0	5	0	0+1	0
7	FW	(Norway) NOR	Mohamed Ofkir	32	14	29	12	0+3	2
8	MF	(Sweden) SWE	William Kurtovic	29	2	25+1	2	2+1	0
9	FW	(Norway) NOR	Sivert Gussiås	29	1	1+24	0	3+1	1
10	FW	(Costa Rica) CRC	Deyver Vega	21	3	12+7	2	2	1
11	FW	(Norway) NOR	Youssef Chaib	12	2	1+10	1	1	1
12	GK	(Finland) FIN	Hugo Keto	13	0	10	0	3	0
13	DF	(Norway) NOR	Lars Markmanrud	19	0	12+4	0	3	0
14	FW	(Norway) NOR	Alexander Ruud Tveter	32	9	29	8	2+1	1
15	DF	(Norway) NOR	Jesper Taaje	30	2	26+1	2	3	0
17	DF	(Norway) NOR	Sander Moen Foss	2	0	2	0	0	0
18	DF	(Norway) NOR	Fredrik Pålerud	14	0	8+4	0	2	0
19	MF	(Bosnia and Herzegovina) BIH	Amer Ordagić	19	0	10+6	0	3	0
20	FW	(Norway) NOR	Franklin Nyenetue	31	3	15+12	2	2+2	1
21	DF	(Norway) NOR	Fredrik Flo	16	1	6+8	1	2	0
23	MF	(South Africa) RSA	Keanin Ayer	21	4	7+11	3	3	1
24	MF	(Norway) NOR	Harmeet Singh	14	1	6+8	1	0	0
25	DF	(Norway) NOR	Vetle Walle Egeli	11	1	5+1	0	5	1
26	MF	(Norway) NOR	Filip Loftesnes-Bjune	6	1	0+3	0	1+2	1
27	MF	(Sweden) SWE	Albin Winbo	13	1	5+8	1	0	0
28	MF	(Spain) ESP	Rufo	11	1	10+1	1	0	0
29	FW	(Norway) NOR	Wally Njie	1	0	0+1	0	0	0
36	FW	(Norway) NOR	Sebastian Mathisen	3	0	0+2	0	1	0
41	MF	(Norway) NOR	Benjamin Andersen	1	0	0+1	0	0	0
54	GK	(Norway) NOR	Andreas Albertsen	0	0	0	0	0	0
–	DF	(Norway) NOR	Jørgen Kili Fjeldskår	0	0	0	0	0	0
Players away from Sandefjord on loan:
Players who left Sandefjord during the season:
16	MF	(Norway) NOR	André Södlund	1	0	0+1	0	0	0
21	DF	(Norway) NOR	Philip Slørdahl	7	0	3+3	0	1	0

=== Disciplinary record ===
Number	Position	Nation	Name	Eliteserien		Norwegian Cup		Total	
Number	Position	Nation	Name	Booked	Sent off (straight red)	Booked	Sent off (straight red)	Booked	Sent off (straight red)
1	GK	(Norway)	Jacob Storevik	0	0	0	0	0	0
2	DF	(Norway)	Mats Haakenstad	2	0	0	0	2	0
3	DF	(Netherlands)	Quint Jansen	1	0	0	0	1	0
4	DF	(Netherlands)	Ian Smeulers	5	0	0	0	5	0
5	MF	(Sweden)	Aleksander Damnjanovic Nilsson	3	0	0	0	3	0
6	MF	(Norway)	Sander Risan Mørk	1	0	0	0	1	0
7	FW	(Norway)	Mohamed Ofkir	4	0	0	0	4	0
8	MF	(Sweden)	William Kurtovic	5	0	0	0	5	0
9	FW	(Norway)	Sivert Gussiås	2	0	0	0	2	0
10	FW	(Costa Rica)	Deyver Vega	3	0	0	0	3	0
11	FW	(Norway)	Youssef Chaib	1	0	0	0	1	0
12	GK	(Finland)	Hugo Keto	1	0	0	0	1	0
13	DF	(Norway)	Lars Markmanrud	2	0	0	0	2	0
14	FW	(Norway)	Alexander Ruud Tveter	0	0	0	0	0	0
15	DF	(Norway)	Jesper Taaje	4	0	0	0	4	0
17	DF	(Norway)	Sander Moen Foss	0	0	0	0	0	0
18	MF	(Norway)	Fredrik Pålerud	0	0	2	0	2	0
19	MF	(Bosnia and Herzegovina)	Amer Ordagić	2	0	0	0	2	0
20	FW	(Norway)	Franklin Nyenetue	1	0	0	0	1	0
21	DF	(Norway)	Fredrik Flo	0	0	0	0	1	0
22	MF	(Equatorial Guinea)	Federico Bikoro	1	0	0	0	1	0
23	MF	(South Africa)	Keanin Ayer	2	0	0	0	2	0
24	MF	(Norway)	Harmeet Singh	3	0	0	0	3	0
25	DF	(Norway)	Vetle Walle Egeli	1	0	0	0	1	0
26	MF	(Norway)	Filip Loftesnes-Bjune	0	0	0	0	0	0
27	MF	(Sweden)	Albin Winbo	3	0	0	0	3	0
28	MF	(Spain)	Rufo	2	0	0	0	2	0
29	FW	(Norway)	Wally Njie	0	0	0	0	0	0
36	FW	(Norway)	Sebastian Mathisen	0	0	0	0	0	0
41	MF	(Norway)	Benjamin Andersen	0	0	0	0	0	0
54	GK	(Norway)	Andreas Albertsen	0	0	0	0	0	0
–	DF	(Norway)	Jørgen Kili Fjeldskår	0	0	0	0	0	0
Players away from Sandefjord on loan:
Players who left Sandefjord during the season:
16	MF	(Norway)	André Södlund	0	0	0	0	0	0
21	DF	(Norway)	Philip Slørdahl	0	0	0	0	1	0
			TOTALS	0	0	0	0	0	0
