= 2023 Sandefjord Fotball season =

Sandefjord
2023 season
- Chairman: Gunnar Bjønness
- Head coaches: Hans Erik Ødegaard; Andreas Tegström
- Stadium: Release Arena
- Eliteserien: 13th
- 2022 Norwegian Cup: Quarter-finals
- 2023 Norwegian Cup: First round
- Top goalscorer: League: Danilo Al-Saed (11); All: Danilo Al-Saed (11)
Home colours	Away colours

The 2023 season was Sandefjord Fotball's 25th season in existence and the club's fourth consecutive season in the top flight of Norwegian football. In addition to the domestic league, Sandefjord Fotball participated in this season's edition of the Norwegian Football Cup.

== Players ==
=== First team squad ===
As of 29 August 2023

Note: Flags indicate national team as defined under FIFA eligibility rules; some limited exceptions apply. Players may hold more than one non-FIFA nationality.

No.	Pos.	Nation	Player
1	GK	FIN	Hugo Keto
2	DF	NOR	Fredrik Pålerud
3	DF	NOR	Vetle Walle Egeli
4	DF	NOR	Fredrik Carson Pedersen
6	MF	NOR	Sander Risan Mørk
7	FW	GHA	Gilbert Koomson
8	MF	SWE	Aleksander Damnjanovic Nilsson
9	FW	NOR	Alexander Ruud Tveter
10	MF	DEN	Jeppe Kjær (on loan from Bodø/Glimt)
11	FW	NOR	Youssef Chaib
12	GK	NOR	Mats Viken
14	FW	IRQ	Danilo Al-Saed

No.	Pos.	Nation	Player
15	DF	NOR	Jesper Taaje (vice-captain)
16	FW	NOR	Wally Njie
17	DF	NOR	Sander Moen Foss (captain)
18	MF	SWE	Filip Ottosson
19	DF	NOR	Fredrik Berglie
20	FW	NOR	Franklin Nyenetue
21	MF	SYR	Simon Amin
23	MF	RSA	Keanin Ayer
26	DF	NOR	Filip Loftesnes-Bjune
27	FW	NOR	Jakob Dunsby
30	GK	NOR	Alf Lukas Noel Grønneberg

=== Out on loan ===
Note: Flags indicate national team as defined under FIFA eligibility rules; some limited exceptions apply. Players may hold more than one non-FIFA nationality.

No.	Pos.	Nation	Player
13	DF	NOR	Lars Markmanrud (at Egersund until 31 December 2023)
22	DF	NOR	Jørgen Kili Fjeldskår (at Fram until 31 December 2023)

== Transfers ==
=== Winter ===
In: Note: Flags indicate national team as defined under FIFA eligibility rules; some limited exceptions apply. Players may hold more than one non-FIFA nationality.

No.	Pos.	Nation	Player
7	FW	GHA	Gilbert Koomson (from Bodø/Glimt)
12	GK	NOR	Mats Gulbrandsen Viken (from KFUM)
14	MF	SWE	Danilo Al-Saed (from (Sweden) Sandviken)
18	MF	SWE	Filip Ottosson (from (Sweden) Landskrona)
21	MF	SYR	Simon Amin (from (Sweden) Trelleborg)
24	DF	NOR	Fredrik Berglie (from Skeid)
27	MF	NOR	Jakob Maslø Dunsby (from Egersund)
30	GK	NOR	Alf Lukas Noel Grønneberg (from Eik Tønsberg)
54	GK	NOR	Andreas Albertsen (loan return from Halsen)

Out: Note: Flags indicate national team as defined under FIFA eligibility rules; some limited exceptions apply. Players may hold more than one non-FIFA nationality.

No.	Pos.	Nation	Player
1	GK	NOR	Jacob Storevik (to Vålerenga)
2	DF	NOR	Mats Haakenstad (to Kongsvinger)
3	DF	NED	Quint Jansen (to Mjøndalen)
7	MF	NOR	Mohamed Ofkir (to Vålerenga)
8	MF	SWE	William Kurtovic (to Hamkam)
9	FW	NOR	Sivert Gussiås (to (Faroe Islands) KÍ Klaksvík)
10	FW	CRC	Deyver Vega (released)
16	MF	NOR	André Sødlund (retired)
19	MF	BIH	Amer Ordagić (released)
21	DF	NOR	Fredrik Flo (to Skeid)
22	DF	NOR	Jørgen Kili Fjeldskår (on loan to Fram)
24	MF	NOR	Harmeet Singh (released)
27	MF	SWE	Albin Winbo (loan return to (Sweden) Varberg)
28	FW	ESP	Rufo (to (Spain) Logroñés)

=== Summer ===
In: Note: Flags indicate national team as defined under FIFA eligibility rules; some limited exceptions apply. Players may hold more than one non-FIFA nationality.

No.	Pos.	Nation	Player
4	DF	NOR	Fredrik Carson Pedersen (from Grorud)
10	FW	DEN	Jeppe Kjær (on loan to Sandefjord)
32	DF	NOR	Martin Gjone (promoted from junior squad)
34	FW	NOR	Storm Bugge Pettersen (promoted from junior squad)

Out: Note: Flags indicate national team as defined under FIFA eligibility rules; some limited exceptions apply. Players may hold more than one non-FIFA nationality.

No.	Pos.	Nation	Player
4	DF	NED	Ian Smeulers (to (Netherlands) Excelsior)
5	MF	GEQ	Federico Bikoro (released)
13	DF	NOR	Lars Markmanrud (on loan to Egersund)
18	FW	NOR	Wally Njie (on loan to Ørn Horten)
54	GK	NOR	Andreas Albertsen (to Halsen)
–	DF	NED	Quint Jansen (to (Cyprus) Othellos Athienou, previously on loan at Mjøndalen)

== Pre-season and friendlies ==
Win Draw Loss Fixtures

2 April 2023 Friendly	Strømsgodset (Norway)	2–2	(Norway) Sandefjord	Drammen
17:00 CEST (UTC+2)				Stadium: Marienlyst Stadion

== Competitions ==
=== Overview ===
Competition	First match	Last match	Starting round	Final position	Record							
Competition	First match	Last match	Starting round	Final position	Pld	W	D	L	GF	GA	GD	Win %
Eliteserien	10 April 2023	3 December 2023	Matchday 1		30	8	7	15	47	55	−8	26.67
2022 Norwegian Cup	12 March 2023	19 March 2023	Fourth round	Quarter-finals	2	1	0	1	4	4	+0	50.00
2023 Norwegian Cup	24 May 2023		First round	First round	1	0	1	0	2	2	+0	0.00
Total					33	9	8	16	53	61	−8	27.27

Last updated: 3 December 2023
Source: Soccerway

=== Eliteserien ===
==== League table ====
Pos	Team	Pld	W	D	L	GF	GA	GD	Pts	Qualification or relegation
11	HamKam	30	10	4	16	39	59	−20	34	
12	Haugesund	30	9	6	15	34	40	−6	33	
13	Sandefjord	30	8	7	15	47	55	−8	31	
14	Vålerenga (R)	30	7	8	15	39	50	−11	29	Qualification for the relegation play-offs
15	Stabæk (R)	30	7	8	15	30	48	−18	29	Relegation to First Division

Source: Football Association of Norway (in Norwegian)
Rules for classification: 1) Points; 2) Goal difference; 3) Goals scored; 4) Head-to-head points; 5) Head-to-head goal difference; 6) Head-to-head goals scored.
(R) Relegated

==== Results summary ====
Overall								Home						Away					
Pld	W	D	L	GF	GA	GD	Pts	W	D	L	GF	GA	GD	W	D	L	GF	GA	GD
30	8	7	15	47	55	−8	31	6	5	4	26	17	+9	2	2	11	21	38	−17

Last updated: 3 December 2023.

==== Results by round ====
Round	1	2	3	4	5	6	7	8	9	10	11	12	13	14	15	16	17	18	19	20	21	22	23	24	25	26	27	28	29	30
Ground	A	H	A	H	A	H	A	A	H	A	H	A	H	A	H	A	H	H	A	H	A	H	A	H	A	H	A	H	A	H
Result	L	D	D	W	D	L	L	L	W	L	L	L	D	L	L	W	W	D	L	D	L	W	L	L	L	D	W	W	L	W
Position	14	14	14	10	8	11	13	14	12	14	14	14	14	15	15	15	13	14	14	15	15	13	13	15	15	15	13	13	14	13

A = Away; H = Home; W = Win; D = Draw; L = Loss

==== Matches ====
The league fixtures were announced on 9 December 2022.

10 April 2023 1	HamKam	2–0	Sandefjord	Hamar
17:00 CEST (UTC+2)	Udahl 29' (pen.), 45+3'; Hernandez-Foster (yellow card) 62'	Report	Taaje (yellow card) 47'	Stadium: Briskeby Stadion; Attendance: 3,715; Referee: Sivert Øksnes Amland

16 April 2023 2	Sandefjord	0–0	Tromsø	Sandefjord
17:00 CEST (UTC+2)	Amin (yellow card) 22'; Ottosson (yellow card) 90+5'	Report		Stadium: Release Arena; Attendance: 3,313; Referee: Sigurd Smehus Kringstad

23 April 2023 3	Rosenborg	1–1	Sandefjord	Trondheim
17:00 CEST (UTC+2)	Henriksen (yellow card) 23'; Tagseth (yellow card) 80'; Holse 90+4'	Report	Loftesnes-Bjune (yellow card) 18'; Walle Egeli (yellow card) 19'; Ayer (yellow card) 31'; Bikoro 31'; Ottosson (yellow card) 44'; Smeulers (yellow card) 76'	Stadium: Lerkendal Stadion; Attendance: 11,256; Referee: Kristoffer Hagenes

30 April 2023 4	Sandefjord	4–0	Aalesund	Sandefjord
17:00 CEST (UTC+2)	Al-Saed 6'; Fällman 43' (o.g.); Taaje 61'; Nyenetue (yellow card) 90'; Chaib 90'	Report	Munksgaard (yellow card) 47'; Segberg (yellow card) 62'	Stadium: Release Arena; Attendance: 3,086; Referee: Ajdin Medic

8 May 2023 5	Brann	0–0	Sandefjord	Bergen
19:00 CEST (UTC+2)		Report	Dunsby (yellow card) 41'; Bikoro (yellow card) 65'; Keto (yellow card) 82'	Stadium: Brann Stadion; Attendance: 14,720; Referee: Mohammad Usman Aslam

13 May 2023 6	Sandefjord	1–2	Viking	Sandefjord
17:00 CEST (UTC+2)	Tveter 11'; Loftesne-Bjune (yellow card) 80'	Report	D'Agostino 14'; Pattynama (yellow card) 38'; Løkberg 90'	Stadium: Release Arena; Attendance: 3,463; Referee: Steinar Hauge

16 May 2023 7	Strømsgodset	1–0	Sandefjord	Drammen
18:00 CEST (UTC+2)	Hanssen 42'; Stengel (yellow card) 65'; Stenevik (yellow card) 87'; Dahl (yellow card) 90+1'	Report		Stadium: Marienlyst Stadion; Attendance: 5,827; Referee: Marius Hansen Grøtta

29 May 2023 8	Molde	5–0	Sandefjord	Molde
17:00 CEST (UTC+2)	Breivik 18'; Linnes 27'; Grødem 49'; Brynhildsen 56', 66'	Report	Bikoro (yellow card) 33'; Foss (yellow card) 38'; Smeulers (yellow card) 51'	Stadium: Aker Stadion; Attendance: 5,617; Referee: Marius Lien

4 June 2023 9	Sandefjord	4–1	Odd	Sandefjord
17:00 CEST (UTC+2)	Al-Saed 11', 65'; Koomson 53'; Hagen 56' (o.g.); Taaje (yellow card) 78'	Report	S. Owusu (yellow card) 15'; Bang-Kittilsen (yellow card) 45'; Tomas (yellow card) 67'; Tewelde 90+2'	Stadium: Release Arena; Attendance: 4,342; Referee: Mohammad Usman Aslam

11 June 2023 10	Haugesund	3–2	Sandefjord	Haugesund
17:00 CEST (UTC+2)	Njie 10'; Taaje 13' (o.g.); Diarra 20'; Therkildsen (yellow card) 67'; Samuelsen (yellow card) 81'	Report	Al-Saed 55'; Nyenetue 90+3'	Stadium: Haugesund Stadion; Attendance: 3,709; Referee: Espen Eskås

2 July 2023 12	Sarpsborg 08	6–1	Sandefjord	Sarpsborg
17:00 CEST (UTC+2)	Opseth 10', 20'; Torp 11'; Soltvedt 51'; Lundqvist 67'; Wichne 79'	Report	Smeulers (yellow card) 32'; Taaje 45+1'	Stadium: Sarpsborg Stadion; Attendance: 4,494; Referee: Rohit Saggi

9 July 2023 13	Sandefjord	0–0	Stabæk	Sandefjord
17:00 CEST (UTC+2)	Ayer (yellow card) 42'; Ottosson (yellow card) 82'	Report	Bakenga (penalty missed) 35'; Geelmuyden (yellow card) 88'	Stadium: Release Arena; Attendance: 2,994; Referee: Marius Hansen Grøtta

16 July 2023 14	Lillestrøm	4–2	Sandefjord	Lillestrøm
17:00 CEST (UTC+2)	Lehne Olsen 9', 68'; Adams 18', 38'; Skjærvik (yellow card) 85'	Report	Ayer 11'; Taaje 70'; Smeulers (yellow card) 80'; Dunsby (yellow card) 90+2'	Stadium: Åråsen Stadion; Attendance: 5,835; Referee: Sigurd Smehus Kringstad

23 July 2023 15	Sandefjord	2–5	Bodø/Glimt	Sandefjord
17:00 CEST (UTC+2)	Nilsson 13'; Smeulers (yellow card) 15' (yellow-red card) 63'; Ayer 21'; Taaje (yellow card) 34'	Report	Grønbæk 11', 41'; Pellegrino 34' (pen.); Pemi (yellow card) 53' (goal) 76'; Saltnes 88'	Stadium: Release Arena; Attendance: 4,391; Referee: Ajdin Medic

29 July 2023 16	Vålerenga	2–3	Sandefjord	Oslo
15:30 CEST (UTC+2)	Jatta 52'; Bjørdal (yellow card) 62'; Strand 90'; Borchgrevink (yellow card) 90+2'	Report	Ottosson 63'; Al-Saed 72'; Nyenetue (yellow card) 76' (goal) 90+4'; Nilsson (yellow card) 90+3'	Stadium: Intility Arena; Attendance: 9,902; Referee: Rohit Saggi

6 August 2023 17	Sandefjord	5–1	Sarpsborg 08	Sandefjord
17:00 CEST (UTC+2)	Nilsson 32', 80'; Nyenetue 45+2'; Al-Saed 74'; Taaje 90'	Report	Torp 1'; Ngouali (yellow card) 24'	Stadium: Release Arena; Attendance: 3,082; Referee: Marius Lien

12 August 2023 18	Sandefjord	2–2	Molde	Sandefjord
16:00 CEST (UTC+2)	Nilsson 39' (pen.); Smeulers (yellow card) 72'; Tveter 90+4'	Report	Hansen (yellow card) 45+2'; Grødem 51'; Bjørnbak (yellow card) 75'; Linnes 85'	Stadium: Release Arena; Attendance: 4,754; Referee: Kristoffer Hagenes

20 August 2023 19	Tromsø	1–0	Sandefjord	Tromsø
17:00 CEST (UTC+2)	Romsaas 85'; Gundersen (yellow card) 90'	Report		Stadium: Romssa Arena; Attendance: 5,411; Referee: Daniel Higraff

27 August 2023 20	Sandefjord	0–0	Haugesund	Sandefjord
19:15 CEST (UTC+2)	Mørk (yellow card) 57'; Egeli (yellow card) 90+7'	Report	Søderlund (yellow card) 15' (yellow-red card) 89'; Solheim (yellow card) 58'	Stadium: Release Arena; Attendance: 2,845; Referee: Rohit Saggi

3 September 2023 21	Odd	3–2	Sandefjord	Skien
17:00 CEST (UTC+2)	Jørgensen (yellow card) 20' (goal) 43'; Tewelde 33'; S. Owusu 86'; L. Owusu (yellow card) 90+1'; Hien (yellow card) 90+2'	Report	Nyenetue 16'; Al-Saed 45' (yellow card) 58'	Stadium: Skagerak Arena; Attendance: 4,981; Referee: Ola Hobber Nilsen

16 September 2023 22	Sandefjord	2–0	Strømsgodset	Sandefjord
18:00 CEST (UTC+2)	Nilsson 59'; Ottosson 89'	Report	Dahl (yellow card) 88'	Stadium: Release Arena; Attendance: 3,733; Referee: Sivert Øksnes Amland

24 September 2023 23	Viking	4–3	Sandefjord	Stavanger
17:00 CEST (UTC+2)	de Lanlay 12'; Salvesen 17', 53'; Adegbenro 85'	Report	Nyenetue 29'; Al-Saed 41' (yellow card) 45+1'; Ayer (yellow card) 89'; Ruud Tveter 90' (pen.)	Stadium: Viking Stadion; Attendance: 13,022; Referee: Sigurd Smehus Kringstad

1 October 2023 11	Sandefjord	1–2	Vålerenga	Sandefjord
17:00 CEST (UTC+2)	Al-Saed 68'	Report	Ilić 40'; Borchgrevink (yellow card) 52'; Strandberg 56' (pen.); Juklerød (yellow card) 72'	Stadium: Release Arena; Attendance: 4,905; Referee: Marius Hansen Grøtta

8 October 2023 24	Sandefjord	0–1	HamKam	Sandefjord
17:00	Nyenetue (yellow card) 56'	Report	Udahl (yellow card) 53' (goal) 61' (pen.); Bjørlo (yellow card) 54'; Sandberg (yellow card) 76'	Stadium: Release Arena; Attendance: 2,689; Referee: Rohit Saggi

21 October 2023 25	Bodø/Glimt	4–3	Sandefjord	Bodø
15:00 CEST (UTC+2)	Pemi 22' (yellow card) 45+1'; Žugelj 24'; Grønbæk 27'; Saltnes 45+2'; Haikin (yellow card) 90+2'	Report	Kjær 13'; Al-Saed 36'; Mørk (yellow card) 49'; Dunsby 53'	Stadium: Aspmyra Stadion; Attendance: 6,401; Referee: Daniel Higraff

29 October 2023 26	Sandefjord	1–1	Brann	Sandefjord
17:00 CET (UTC+1)	Dunsby (yellow card) 48'; Nyenetue 90'	Report	Myhre (yellow card) 14'; Børsting (yellow card) 31'; Soltvedt (yellow card) 48'; Knudsen 85'; Larsen (yellow card) 89'	Stadium: Release Arena; Attendance: 6,598; Referee: Christian Moen

6 November 2023 27	Aalesund	0–3	Sandefjord	Ålesund
19:00 CET (UTC+1)	Segberg (yellow card) 38'; Ebiye (yellow card) 68'	Report	Kjær (yellow card) 16'; Egeli (yellow card) 45+1'; Dunsby 49'; Al-Saed 72'; Ruud Tveter 81'	Stadium: Color Line Stadion; Attendance: 4,720; Referee: Kristoffer Hagenes

12 November 2023 28	Sandefjord	3–2	Rosenborg	Sandefjord
17:00 CET (UTC+1)	Damnjanovic Nilsson (yellow card) 2'; Walle Egeli 5'; Dunsby 36'; Ruud Tveter 45+4' (pen.); Keto (yellow card) 82'	Report	Selnæs (yellow card) 17'; Wiedesheim-Paul 49'; Røsten 72'	Stadium: Release Arena; Attendance: 4,063; Referee: Kai Erik Steen

26 November 2023 29	Stabæk	2–1	Sandefjord	Bærum
17:00 CET (UTC+1)	Bakenga 8'; Næss (yellow card) 62'; Kabran (penalty missed) 90+6' 90+6'	Report	Al-Saed (yellow card) 50'; Ruud Tveter 63' (pen.); Moen Foss (yellow card) 90+4'	Stadium: Nadderud Stadion; Attendance: 3,615; Referee: Rohit Saggi

3 December 2023 30	Sandefjord	1–0	Lillestrøm	Sandefjord
17:00 CET (UTC+1)	Tveter 43' (pen.)	Report		Stadium: Release Arena; Attendance: 3,757; Referee: Svein Oddvar Moen

=== Norwegian Football Cup ===
==== 2022 ====
12 March 2023 Fourth round	Sandefjord	4–1	Odd	Mjøndalen
17:00 CEST (UTC+2)	Tveter 4'; Dunsby 10', 26'; Al-Saed 24' (yellow card) 64'; Pålerud (yellow card) 52'	Report	Wallem 81'; Aas (yellow card) 90+2'	Stadium: Consto Arena; Attendance: 397; Referee: Daniel Higraff

19 March 2023 Quarter-finals	Brann	3–0	Sandefjord	Åsane
20:00 CEST (UTC+2)	Myhre 21'; Wolfe 25'; Rasmussen 37'	Report	Pålerud (yellow card) 41'; Berglie (yellow card) 55'	Stadium: Åsane Arena; Attendance: 2,243; Referee: Tom Harald Hagen

==== 2023 ====
24 May 2023 First round	Eik Tønsberg	2–2 (a.e.t.) (4–3 p)	Sandefjord	Tønsberg
18:00 CEST (UTC+2)	Danielsen (yellow card) 63'; Rygel 69'; Nygaard 90+6'; Engseth (yellow card) 94'; Andersen (yellow card) 116'; Midtlyng (yellow card) 120+3'	Report	Nilsson 32', 48'; Bikoro (yellow card) 74'; Al-Saed (yellow card) 90+2'	Stadium: Tønsberg Gressbane; Attendance: 1,523; Referee: Håvard Bjerkelund
	Penalties
	Midtgarden (penalty scored); Nygaard (penalty scored); Roberg (penalty scored); Myrbakk (penalty scored); Mathisen (penalty missed)		(penalty missed) Nilsson; (penalty scored) Dunsby; (penalty scored) Ayer; (penalty scored) Al-Saed; (penalty missed) Tveter
