= 2022 Norwegian Football Cup =

Tournament details
- Country: Norway
- Dates: 4 May 2022 – 20 May 2023
- Teams: 128 (competition proper)

Final positions
- Champions: Brann (7th title)
- Runners-up: Lillestrøm

Tournament statistics
- Matches played: 127
- Goals scored: 559 (4.4 per match)
- Top goal scorer(s): Bård Finne (11 goals)

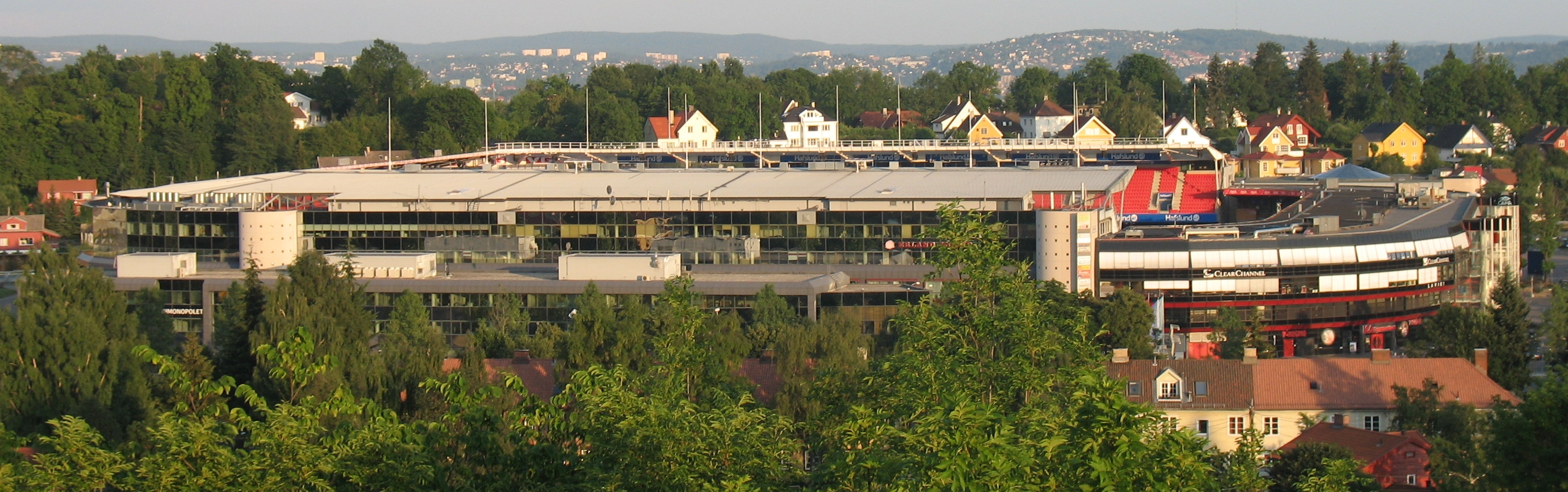
Ullevaal Stadion, Oslo - venue for the Norwegian Cup final

The 2022 Norwegian Football Cup was the 116th season of the Norwegian annual knock-out football tournament. The first round was played in May 2022. The final was played on 20 May 2023.

== Calendar ==
Below are the dates for each round as given by the official schedule:

Round	Main date	Number of fixtures	Clubs
First round	18–19 May 2022	64	128 → 64
Second round	22 June 2022	32	64 → 32
Third round	29 June 2022	16	32 → 16
Fourth round	11–12 March 2023	8	16 → 8
Quarter-finals	18–19 March 2023	4	8 → 4
Semi-finals	26 April 2023	2	4 → 2
Final	20 May 2023	1	2 → 1

== First round ==
The pair-ups for the first round were announced on 7 April 2022.

Number of teams per tier entering this round
Eliteserien (1)	1. divisjon (2)	2. divisjon (3)	3. divisjon (4)	4. divisjon (5)	Total
16 / 16	16 / 16	26 / 28	48 / 84	22 / 270	128 / 416

4 May 2022	Halsen (4)	1–4	(1) Sandefjord	Larvik
18:00 CEST (UTC+2)	Istre 23'	Report	Chaib 8'; Loftesnes-Bjune 27'; Jansen 70'; Gussiås 74'	Stadium: Bergeskogen Kunstgress; Attendance: 450; Referee: Anders Bodding

4 May 2022	Eidsvold (5)	0–7	(1) Lillestrøm	Eidsvoll
18:30 CEST (UTC+2)		Report	Adams 22'; Holst 31'; Ranger 46'; Fridjónsson 51', 66', 68'; Mathew 67'	Stadium: Eidsvoll Stadion; Attendance: 1,300; Referee: Eivind Bodding

11 May 2022	Surnadal (5)	1–4	(1) Kristiansund	Surnadalsøra
17:45 CEST (UTC+2)	Løfaldli 51'	Report	Rakneberg 14'; Alm 56', 86'; Mawa 62'	Stadium: Syltøran Stadion; Referee: Bendik Haarberg

18 May 2022	Junkeren (4)	2–2 (a.e.t.) (4–1 p)	(4) Mjølner	Bodø
17:00 CEST (UTC+2)	Unhjem 78' (pen.); Kapskarmo 110'	Report	Nicolaisen 13'; Foudil 100'	Stadium: Nordlandshallen; Attendance: 116; Referee: Michael Wikestad Pedersen
	Penalties
	Unhjem (penalty scored); Chooly (penalty scored); Marquez (penalty scored); Kristiansen (penalty scored)		(penalty scored) Foudil

18 May 2022	Råde (5)	0–1 (a.e.t.)	(2) Fredrikstad	Råde
18:00 CEST (UTC+2)		Report	Alba 103' (pen.)	Stadium: Råde Kunstgress; Attendance: 1,052; Referee: Sebastian Mikalsen

18 May 2022	Ullern (3)	3–0	(3) Asker	Oslo
18:00 CEST (UTC+2)	Ademaj 45'; Aslaksrud 72'; Evensen 89'	Report		Stadium: Ullern Kunstgress; Referee: Haakon Arve Pedersen Bue

18 May 2022	Bærum (3)	1–2 (a.e.t.)	(3) Kvik Halden	Bærum
18:00 CEST (UTC+2)	Strand 61'	Report	Ness 82', 115'	Stadium: Sandvika Stadion; Attendance: 97; Referee: Marius Bye

18 May 2022	Skjetten (4)	0–3	(3) Ull/Kisa	Lillestrøm
18:00 CEST (UTC+2)		Report	Sundgot 21'; Sørløkk 90' (pen.); Opsahl 90'	Stadium: Skjetten Stadion; Referee: Hakan Catalgøl

18 May 2022	Brumunddal (4)	2–0 (a.e.t.)	(3) Strømmen	Brumunddal
18:00 CEST (UTC+2)	Finstad 94'; Osmo 114'	Report		Stadium: SH-banen Kunstgress; Referee: Herman Bostad

18 May 2022	Pors (4)	2–3	(3) Arendal	Porsgrunn
18:00 CEST (UTC+2)	Larsen 55' (pen.); Shala 86'	Report	Eriksen 11'; Skeie 38'; Race 76'	Stadium: Pors Stadion; Attendance: 250; Referee: Håvard Bjerkelund

18 May 2022	Os (4)	6–5 (a.e.t.)	(2) Åsane	Os
18:00 CEST (UTC+2)	Dyngeland 12'; Fosen 33', 83' (pen.), 102'; Sperrevik 73'; Havsgård 90+3'	Report	Ueland 18'; Doghman 32'; Dyrstad 52'; Hagos 65'; Ekeberg 85'	Stadium: Kuventræ Kunstgress; Referee: Sondre Brudvik

18 May 2022	Bremnes (4)	2–5	(3) Øygarden	Svortland
18:00 CEST (UTC+2)	Nesse 11', 28'	Report	Bildøy 4'; Dang 32', 55', 58', 80'	Stadium: Sentralidrettsanlegget; Referee: Freek Arjen van Herk

18 May 2022	Voss (5)	0–7	(2) Brann	Vossevangen
18:00 CEST (UTC+2)		Report	Finne 3', 36', 56'; Blomberg 50'; Trengereid 63', 78'; Haaland 66'	Stadium: Prestegardsmoen Gras; Referee: Steinar Hauge

18 May 2022	Træff (3)	4–4 (a.e.t.) (2–4 p)	(3) Vard Haugesund	Molde
18:00 CEST (UTC+2)	Kjørsvik 1'; Bolsø 47'; Woldsund 51'; Janbu 118'	Report	Olsen 8'; Miljeteig 22'; Nordtveit 68'; Bonilla 99'	Stadium: Reknesbanen; Attendance: 200; Referee: Daniel Refsnes
	Penalties
	Beinset (penalty scored); Kristengård (penalty scored)		(penalty scored) Olsen; (penalty scored) Agano; (penalty scored) Granat; (penalty scored) Apeland

18 May 2022	Herd (5)	0–2	(1) Molde	Ålesund
18:00 CEST (UTC+2)		Report	Fofana 16'; Ødegård 68'	Stadium: AMFI Moa Stadion; Attendance: 300; Referee: Even Myrheim

18 May 2022	Trygg/Lade (4)	1–2	(3) Levanger	Trondheim
18:00 CEST (UTC+2)	Bruseth 77'	Report	Bojadzic 54'; Ulstad 60'	Stadium: OBOS Kunstgressbane; Referee: Mats Thorsø Hansen

18 May 2022	Orkla (4)	3–6	(2) Stjørdals-Blink	Orkanger
18:00 CEST (UTC+2)	Johansen 47'; Lynum 79', 86'	Report	Stokke 23', 36'; Lillebo 30'; Rønning 33', 45'; Pettersen 90'	Stadium: Orkla Sparebank Stadion; Attendance: 218; Referee: Henrikke Holm Nervik

18 May 2022	Finnsnes (5)	2–4	(3) Tromsdalen	Finnsnes
18:00 CEST (UTC+2)	Empa 39'; Arnesen 70' (pen.)	Report	Swaleh 50', 72', 80'; Egerton 90'	Stadium: Finnsnes Kunstgress; Referee: Øyvind Jøstensen

18 May 2022	Bossekop (4)	0–2	(3) Alta	Alta
18:00 CEST (UTC+2)		Report	Abelsen 18', 55'	Stadium: COOP Arena Kunstgress; Attendance: 278; Referee: Magnus Henriksen Tjelle

18 May 2022	Nordstrand (4)	0–1	(3) Frigg	Oslo
18:30 CEST (UTC+2)		Report	Ferrer 8'	Stadium: Nordstrand Kunstgress; Referee: Chris Nicklas Braseth

18 May 2022	Lokomotiv Oslo (4)	1–2	(3) Eidsvold Turn	Oslo
19:00 CEST (UTC+2)	Storeskar 77'	Report	Teksum 37'; Nesset 90'	Stadium: Norges Idrettshøgskole; Referee: Morten Andersen-Gott

18 May 2022	Harstad (4)	2–1	(4) Senja	Harstad
19:00 CEST (UTC+2)	Aronsen 7'; Andreassen 59'	Report	Uteng 78' (pen.)	Stadium: Harstad Stadion; Attendance: 150; Referee: Ole Ragnar Jansen Knutsen

18 May 2022	Gjøvik-Lyn (3)	1–1 (a.e.t.) (4–2 p)	(2) Raufoss	Gjøvik
19:30 CEST (UTC+2)	Bjørnerud 81'	Report	Bydal 90+5'	Stadium: Gjøvik Stadion; Attendance: 930; Referee: Mohammad Hafezi
	Penalties
	Ravndal (penalty scored); Nelson (penalty scored); Østerud (penalty scored); Olsen (penalty missed); Lekaj (penalty scored)		(penalty missed) Bydal; (penalty scored) Lauvli; (penalty missed) Frøysa; (penalty scored) Andersen

19 May 2022	Sprint-Jeløy (4)	2–3	(3) Moss	Moss
18:00 CEST (UTC+2)	Reinback 25', 49'	Report	Braga 57', 72'; Potur 81'	Stadium: Bellevue Kunstgress; Referee: Abdulhadi Al-Fahad

19 May 2022	Oppsal (4)	0–4	(2) Skeid	Oslo
18:00 CEST (UTC+2)		Report	Tjøstheim 28', 31'; Andersen 70'; Gyedu 77'	Stadium: Trasop Kunstgress; Attendance: 250; Referee: Emilie Rodahl Torkelsen

19 May 2022	Gamle Oslo (5)	0–3	(2) KFUM Oslo	Oslo
18:00 CEST (UTC+2)		Report	Stavrum 9', 13'; Svindland 76'	Stadium: Bjølsen Kunstgress; Referee: Satha Sejoohn Sritharan

19 May 2022	Lyn (4)	2–3	(2) Stabæk	Oslo
18:00 CEST (UTC+2)	Nilsen 21'; Olsen 89'	Report	Pedersen 12', 90+3'; Ottesen 34'	Stadium: Bislett Stadion; Attendance: 1,438; Referee: Jørgen Haugen

19 May 2022	Follo (4)	0–0 (a.e.t.) (3–4 p)	(2) Grorud	Ski
18:00 CEST (UTC+2)		Report		Stadium: Ski Stadion; Referee: Herman Holthe
	Penalties
	Elshaug (penalty scored); Dalseth (penalty missed); Gonella (penalty missed); Ruud (penalty scored); Reinfjord (penalty scored); Østbye (penalty missed)		(penalty scored) Pedersen; (penalty missed) Osestad; (penalty scored) Aarflot; (penalty scored) Kristensen; (penalty missed) Ness; (penalty scored) Elmi

19 May 2022	Gjelleråsen (4)	3–4	(3) Kjelsås	Nittedal
18:00 CEST (UTC+2)	Ahmad 85'; Bright-Taylor 88'; Hjelkerud 90'	Report	Gripsgård 14', 65'; Hanstad 23'; Vinge 89'	Stadium: Li Kunstgress; Referee: Arion Shaqiri

19 May 2022	Lørenskog (4)	1–2 (a.e.t.)	(2) Kongsvinger	Lørenskog
18:00 CEST (UTC+2)	Fajfric 100'	Report	Bringaker 97', 103'	Stadium: Rolvsrud Kunstgress; Attendance: 138; Referee: Sander Magdalon Bråten Johannessen

19 May 2022	Elverum (4)	2–1	(5) Ottestad	Elverum
18:00 CEST (UTC+2)	Johansen 4'; Magomadov 47'	Report	Deglum 36'	Stadium: Elverum Stadion; Attendance: 150; Referee: Christoffer Dalby Bergstuen

19 May 2022	Furnes (5)	0–7	(1) HamKam	Ringsaker
18:00 CEST (UTC+2)		Report	Enkerud 4', 15'; Faraas 8', 63'; Daškevičs 47'; Nouri 72'; Yakovenko 78'	Stadium: Gaalaasbana; Attendance: 1,307; Referee: Johan William Grundt

19 May 2022	Kolbu/KK (5)	1–5	(1) Vålerenga	Kolbu
18:00 CEST (UTC+2)	Sønsteby 62'	Report	Dønnum 3' (pen.); Udahl 22'; Jatta 51', 60'; Ismaheel 84'	Stadium: Kolbu Idrettsplass; Attendance: 1,750; Referee: Ali al Hatam

19 May 2022	Hønefoss (4)	0–4	(1) Strømsgodset	Hønefoss
18:00 CEST (UTC+2)		Report	Krasniqi 54', 74'; Friday 66'; Gunnarsson 72'	Stadium: Aka Arena; Attendance: 847; Referee: Stian Røvig Sletner

19 May 2022	Åskollen (5)	2–6	(2) Mjøndalen	Drammen
18:00 CEST (UTC+2)	Brovina 25'; Raaholt 66'	Report	Ovenstad 23', 45', 62'; Bekteshi 51'; Eriksen 64'; Bamenye 73'	Stadium: Glassverket Kunstgress; Referee: André Bjørgen Birkeland

19 May 2022	Åssiden (5)	1–2	(3) Notodden	Drammen
18:00 CEST (UTC+2)	Cetin 20'	Report	Frithzell 32'; Hansen 68'	Stadium: Åssiden Stadion; Referee: Ole Jonny Aasane Ulleberg

19 May 2022	Flint (5)	2–1 (a.e.t.)	(4) Eik Tønsberg	Tønsberg
18:00 CEST (UTC+2)	Trevor 32'; Krysian 119'	Report	Roberg 87'	Stadium: Flint ESSO Arena; Referee: Jonas Johnsen

19 May 2022	Fram (4)	0–0 (a.e.t.) (7–6 p)	(3) Ørn Horten	Larvik
18:00 CEST (UTC+2)		Report		Stadium: Framparken; Attendance: 470; Referee: Rune Nilsen
	Penalties
	(penalty missed); Ahmed (penalty scored); Pedersen (penalty scored); Jatta (penalty scored); Sowe (penalty scored); Barhe (penalty scored); Mosquera (penalty scored); Einarson (penalty scored)		(penalty scored) Rogulj; (penalty scored) Kadriu; (penalty missed) Knutsen; (penalty scored) Fofana; (penalty scored) Nilsen; (penalty scored) Hamde; (penalty scored) Nordal; (penalty missed) Hargott

19 May 2022	Hei (5)	1–6	(1) Odd	Porsgrunn
18:00 CEST (UTC+2)	Garstad 38'	Report	Bjørtuft 8', 68'; Jørgensen 9', 75'; Kastrati 39'; Stensrud 69'	Stadium: Mortens Plass Kunstgress; Referee: Herman Leiulfsrud Aass

19 May 2022	Vindbjart (4)	0–6	(3) Fløy	Vennesla
18:00 CEST (UTC+2)		Report	Hella 26'; Pedersen 45', 65', 66'; Hama 60' (o.g.); Blom 81'	Stadium: Sparebanken Sør-banen; Attendance: 527; Referee: Zyad Tarik Qashua

19 May 2022	Randesund (4)	0–6	(2) Start	Kristiansand
18:00 CEST (UTC+2)		Report	Sanyang 28', 64', 90'; Tveita 37'; Grundetjern 40'; Cresswell 86'	Stadium: Sukkevann Kunstgress; Referee: Javi Jean-Marc Conny Leo Mertens

19 May 2022	Sola (4)	1–3	(3) Egersund	Sola
18:00 CEST (UTC+2)	Åsbø 74'	Report	Larsen 51', 63'; Michalsen 68'	Stadium: Sola Stadion; Referee: Amir Ajjour

19 May 2022	Vidar (4)	4–0	(3) Staal Jørpeland	Stavanger
18:00 CEST (UTC+2)	Hæstad 10', 27', 41'; Haughom 34'	Report		Stadium: Alustar Arena; Referee: Karoline Marie Jensen

19 May 2022	Djerv 1919 (4)	1–3	(1) Haugesund	Haugesund
18:00 CEST (UTC+2)	Andersen 55'	Report	Therkildsen 18' (pen.); Solheim 37'; Zafeiris 46'	Stadium: Djervbanen; Referee: Jan Morten Tennøy

19 May 2022	Brodd (4)	0–2	(2) Bryne	Stavanger
18:00 CEST (UTC+2)		Report	Langeland 35'; Voilås 75'	Stadium: NSE-banen Midjord; Referee: Aleksander Skjold Vermundsen

19 May 2022	Vardeneset (5)	1–4	(2) Sandnes Ulf	Stavanger
18:00 CEST (UTC+2)	Olsen 86'	Report	Stølås 20', 36'; Høiland 66'; Effiom 70'	Stadium: Vardeneset Kunstgress; Referee: Mischa Huru Kellerhals

19 May 2022	Rosseland (5)	1–6	(1) Viking	Bryne
18:00 CEST (UTC+2)	Hovland 56'	Report	Traoré 2', 81'; Kabran 4'; Sebulonsen 14'; Austbø 48'; Sandberg 51' (pen.)	Stadium: Rosseland Kunstgress; Referee: Ola Kellerhals

19 May 2022	Bjarg (4)	2–1	(4) Fyllingsdalen	Bergen
18:00 CEST (UTC+2)	Vindenes 7'; Tornes 64'	Report	Mykkeltvedt 17'	Stadium: Stavollen Kunstgress; Referee: Markus Lille

19 May 2022	Frøya (4)	2–2 (a.e.t.) (3–5 p)	(4) Fana	Bergen
18:00 CEST (UTC+2)	Berge 65'; Næss 67'	Report	Martinsen 71'; Stakset 90'	Stadium: Frøya Idrettspark; Attendance: 104; Referee: Mattias Gripsgård Sakstad
	Penalties
	Trætteberg (penalty scored); Helland (penalty scored); Næss (penalty scored)		(penalty scored) Høynes; (penalty scored) Martinsen; (penalty scored) Ingebrigtsen; (penalty scored) Brekkhus; (penalty scored) Sørevik

19 May 2022	Gneist (5)	1–3	(3) Sotra	Bergen
18:00 CEST (UTC+2)	Sæverås 55'	Report	Herrem 60'; Kilen 87'; Mvuka 90'	Stadium: Liland Kunstgress; Attendance: 100; Referee: Sivert Øksnes Amland

19 May 2022	Florø (4)	0–5	(2) Sogndal	Florø
18:00 CEST (UTC+2)		Report	K. Hoven 7' (pen.); Nord 43'; Grønner 53'; A. Hoven 67'; Kryger 69'	Stadium: Florø Stadion; Attendance: 310; Referee: Jakob Sande Søgnen

19 May 2022	Fjøra (5)	0–3	(1) Aalesund	Sogndalsfjøra
18:00 CEST (UTC+2)		Report	Määttä 13'; Diaw 53', 55'	Stadium: Fosshaugane Campus; Attendance: 350; Referee: Torgeir Halsen

19 May 2022	Førde (4)	1–5	(3) Hødd	Førde
18:00 CEST (UTC+2)	Sagevik 48' (pen.)	Report	Sivertsen 4', 12'; Nilsen 31'; Hjelmeseth 36' (pen.); Scriven 86'	Stadium: Førde Stadion; Referee: Sivert Endestad Orheim

19 May 2022	Spjelkavik (4)	0–4	(3) Brattvåg	Ålesund
18:00 CEST (UTC+2)		Report	Sveinsson 6', 46'; Skulstad 23' (o.g.); Beite 33'	Stadium: Spjelkavik Stadion; Attendance: 250; Referee: Even Myrheim

19 May 2022	Dahle (5)	1–8	(2) Ranheim	Kristiansund
18:00 CEST (UTC+2)	Dahle 86'	Report	Høiseth 7', 56'; Marklund 21'; Erlien 30'; Mehnert 53', 64' (pen.), 75' (pen.); Alte 89'	Stadium: Dahle Kunstgresspark; Referee: Bendik Haarberg

19 May 2022	Byåsen (4)	1–0	(4) Kolstad	Trondheim
18:00 CEST (UTC+2)	Johansen 79'	Report		Stadium: Byåsen Arena; Attendance: 131; Referee: Veronika Fjeldvær

19 May 2022	Tiller (4)	0–2	(4) Nardo	Trondheim
18:00 CEST (UTC+2)		Report	Kjørstad 36'; Nestaker 60'	Stadium: TOBB Arena Sør; Referee: Per Oscar Grov Heiberg

19 May 2022	Melhus (4)	1–3	(4) Strindheim	Melhus
18:00 CEST (UTC+2)	Øien 32'	Report	Lund 6'; Østeraas 37'; Skaue 52'	Stadium: ÆESTOLT-banen; Referee: Ivan Djuric

19 May 2022	Verdal (5)	0–6	(1) Rosenborg	Verdalsøra
18:00 CEST (UTC+2)		Report	Reitan 3'; Pereira 36'; Hoff 42'; Broholm 46', 68'; Holse 48'	Stadium: Coop Arena; Attendance: 1,800; Referee: Eskil Nils Johan Svedberg

19 May 2022	Rana (4)	0–4	(1) Bodø/Glimt	Mo i Rana
18:00 CEST (UTC+2)		Report	Boniface 14', 79'; Saltnes 29'; Mugisha 73'	Stadium: Sagbakken KGB; Attendance: 1,600; Referee: Martin Berg

19 May 2022	Ishavsbyen (5)	0–8	(1) Tromsø	Tromsø
18:00 CEST (UTC+2)		Report	Tuominen 8', 14', 26'; Kamanzi 12'; Norheim 33', 40', 74'; Jones 71'	Stadium: TUIL Arena; Referee: Kristian Kristiansen

19 May 2022	Express (4)	0–7	(1) Jerv	Fevik
18:30 CEST (UTC+2)		Report	Diallo 17', 46'; Ugland 31'; Sandberg 45', 51'; Schröter 55'; Furtado 84'	Stadium: Fevik Stadion; Attendance: 906; Referee: Jørgen Haga

19 May 2022	Fløya (4)	1–2	(4) Skjervøy	Tromsø
18:30 CEST (UTC+2)	Marblow 13'	Report	Skallebø 18'; Severinsen 73'	Stadium: Fløya Arena; Referee: Eirik Wisted-Thu

19 May 2022	Østsiden (5)	0–7	(1) Sarpsborg 08	Fredrikstad
18:45 CEST (UTC+2)		Report	Heintz 35'; Maigaard 45'; Skålevik 48'; Opseth 58'; Camara 70', 76'	Stadium: Østsiden Idrettsplass; Referee: Ole-Alexander Ekeli Valen

== Second round ==
The pair-ups for the second round were announced on 23 May 2022.

Number of teams per tier entering this round
Eliteserien (1)	1. divisjon (2)	2. divisjon (3)	3. divisjon (4)	4. divisjon (5)	Total
16 / 16	14 / 16	20 / 28	13 / 84	1 / 272	64 / 416

14 June 2022	Eidsvold Turn (3)	3–2	(2) Kongsvinger	Eidsvoll
19:00 CEST (UTC+2)	Nesset 29'; Notoane 90'; Jenssen 90+4'	Report	Andersen 53'; Marthinussen 57'	Stadium: Myhrer Stadion; Attendance: 348; Referee: Harald Sletner

15 June 2022	Frigg (3)	0–1	(2) Skeid	Oslo
19:00 CEST (UTC+2)		Report	Melchior 50'	Stadium: Tørteberg Kunstgress; Referee: Herman Holthe

21 June 2022	Vidar (4)	1–3	(2) Bryne	Stavanger
18:00 CEST (UTC+2)	Jørgensen 90'	Report	Grønli 58', 82' (pen.); Voilås 90+4'	Stadium: Alustar Arena; Attendance: 300; Referee: Aleksander Vermundsen

22 June 2022	Moss (3)	1–0	(1) Sarpsborg 08	Moss
18:00 CEST (UTC+2)	Ali 55'	Report		Stadium: Melløs Stadion; Attendance: 1,176; Referee: Magnus Koløy

22 June 2022	Elverum (4)	1–3	(1) HamKam	Elverum
18:00 CEST (UTC+2)	Lynum 23'	Report	Kongsro 35'; Eriksen 54'; Enkerud 83'	Stadium: Elverum Stadion; Attendance: 1,114; Referee: Tom Harald Hagen

22 June 2022	Kjelsås (3)	1–0	(2) Mjøndalen	Oslo
18:00 CEST (UTC+2)	Brotangen 71' (pen.)	Report		Stadium: Grefsen Stadion; Attendance: 486; Referee: Stian Sletner

22 June 2022	Flint (5)	1–5	(1) Sandefjord	Tønsberg
18:00 CEST (UTC+2)	Njie 71'	Report	Egeli 9'; Vega 12'; Nyenetue 20'; Ayer 73'; Ofkir 76'	Stadium: Flint ESSO Arena; Attendance: 1,012; Referee: Ole-Alexander Valen

22 June 2022	Fram (4)	1–2 (a.e.t.)	(1) Jerv	Larvik
18:00 CEST (UTC+2)	Mosquera 120+1'	Report	Furtado 95' (pen.); Ugland 113'	Stadium: Framparken; Attendance: 910; Referee: Mohammad Hafezi

22 June 2022	Notodden (3)	1–3 (a.e.t.)	(2) Stabæk	Notodden
18:00 CEST (UTC+2)	Frithzell 65'	Report	Næss 34'; Orban 91'; Hansen 94' (pen.)	Stadium: Idrettsparken; Attendance: 207; Referee: Marius Lien

22 June 2022	Arendal (3)	2–3	(2) Start	Arendal
18:00 CEST (UTC+2)	Eriksen 47'; Skeie 76'	Report	Cresswell 45', 50', 86'	Stadium: Norac Stadion; Attendance: 1,231; Referee: Ola Kellerhals

22 June 2022	Fløy (3)	2–3 (a.e.t.)	(1) Odd	Flekkerøy
18:00 CEST (UTC+2)	Hella 66'; Hove 84'	Report	Ruud 10' (pen.); Owusu 52'; Hagen 115'	Stadium: Cemo Arena; Attendance: 612; Referee: Jørgen Haga

22 June 2022	Vard Haugesund (3)	1–2	(1) Viking	Haugesund
18:00 CEST (UTC+2)	Barane 66'	Report	de Lanlay 9'; Vevatne 85'	Stadium: Haugesund Stadion; Attendance: 615; Referee: Mischa Kellerhals

22 June 2022	Sotra (3)	w/o	(3) Øygarden	Øygarden
18:00 CEST (UTC+2)
Note: Øygarden went bankrupt and withdrew their team from all competitions on 2 June 2022.

22 June 2022	Os (4)	1–6	(2) Brann	Os
18:00 CEST (UTC+2)	Ekeland 73'	Report	Finne 18', 29', 57', 87'; Mikkelsen 34' (o.g.); Hilton 90' (o.g.)	Stadium: Kuventræ Stadion; Attendance: 2,300; Referee: Jan Morten Tennøy

22 June 2022	Fana (4)	0–1	(1) Haugesund	Bergen
18:00 CEST (UTC+2)		Report	Therkildsen 23'	Stadium: Nesttun Kunstgress; Attendance: 499; Referee: Steinar Hauge

22 June 2022	Brattvåg (3)	2–4	(1) Molde	Ålesund
18:00 CEST (UTC+2)	Risa 7' (o.g.); Flem 37'	Report	Løvik 12'; Grødem 44' (pen.); Haugan 83'; Fofana 86'	Stadium: Brattvåg Kunstgress; Attendance: 733; Referee: Mathias Kringstad

22 June 2022	Hødd (3)	0–3	(1) Aalesund	Ulsteinvik
18:00 CEST (UTC+2)		Report	Čanađija 15'; Haugen 29'; Solnørdal 60'	Stadium: Høddvoll; Attendance: 1,316; Referee: Torgeir Halsen

22 June 2022	Byåsen (4)	3–3 (a.e.t.) (4–2 p)	(2) Stjørdals-Blink	Trondheim
18:00 CEST (UTC+2)	Romsdalen 41'; Langørgen 90+1'; Bordal 90+2'	Report; Penalties	Kosberg 12'; Fiske 16'; Rolstad 52'	Stadium: Byåsen Arena; Attendance: 182; Referee: Bendik Haarberg
	Penalties
	Alseth (penalty scored); Halgunset (penalty scored); Johansen (penalty missed); Risan (penalty scored); Nytoft (penalty scored)		(penalty scored) Stokke; (penalty missed) Lillebo; (penalty missed) Kosberg; (penalty scored) Vinje

22 June 2022	Strindheim (4)	1–3	(1) Kristiansund	Trondheim
18:00 CEST (UTC+2)	Strand 23'	Report	Muçolli 28'; Willumsson 52'; Askar 77'	Stadium: Ruta Arena; Referee: Robert Eggen

22 June 2022	Levanger (3)	1–2 (a.e.t.)	(1) Rosenborg	Levanger
18:00 CEST (UTC+2)	Hagbø 20'	Report	Sæter 77'; Fiabema 107'	Stadium: TOBB Arena; Attendance: 2,500; Referee: Mathias Støfringshaug

22 June 2022	Junkeren (4)	1–2	(1) Lillestrøm	Bodø
18:00 CEST (UTC+2)	Chooly 16'	Report	Friðjónsson 23'; Helland 45'	Stadium: Nordlandshallen; Attendance: 658; Referee: Martin Berg

22 June 2022	Harstad (4)	0–5	(1) Bodø/Glimt	Harstad
18:00 CEST (UTC+2)		Report	Hagen 16', 45'; Koomson 25'; Amundsen 42', 62'	Stadium: Harstad Stadion; Referee: Kristian Kristiansen

22 June 2022	Skjervøy (4)	1–4	(1) Tromsø	Skjervøy
18:00 CEST (UTC+2)	Kaspersen 12'	Report	Kitolano 6', 18', 57'; Moses 87'	Stadium: Lerøy Stadion; Attendance: 350; Referee: Magnus Tjelle

22 June 2022	Gjøvik-Lyn (3)	3–2 (a.e.t.)	(1) Strømsgodset	Gjøvik
18:00 CEST (UTC+2)	Ravndal 54'; Skogli 111'; Østerud 120'	Report	Stengel 34'; Friday 106'	Stadium: Gjøvik Stadion; Attendance: 1,250; Referee: Jørgen Haugen

22 June 2022	Tromsdalen (3)	2–0	(3) Alta	Tromsø
18:30 CEST (UTC+2)	Albertsen 16'; Swaleh 36'	Report		Stadium: TUIL Arena; Referee: Abdulhadi Al-Fahad

22 June 2022	Brumunddal (4)	3–4	(1) Vålerenga	Brumunddal
19:05 CEST (UTC+2)	Finstad 38'; Osmo 44'; Frankmo 82'	Report	Udahl 46'; Zuta 75'; Dønnum 90', 90+1'	Stadium: SH-Banen; Attendance: 1,601; Referee: Anders Bodding

23 June 2022	Kvik Halden (3)	0–1	(2) Fredrikstad	Halden
18:00 CEST (UTC+2)		Report	Åsheim 50'	Stadium: Halden Stadion; Attendance: 1,370; Referee: Eivind Bodding

23 June 2022	Ull/Kisa (3)	2–1	(2) Grorud	Jessheim
18:00 CEST (UTC+2)	Jenssen 12'; Langås 84'	Report	Osestad 17'	Stadium: Jessheim Stadion; Attendance: 504; Referee: Ali al Hatam

23 June 2022	Ullern (3)	0–2	(2) KFUM Oslo	Oslo
18:00 CEST (UTC+2)		Report	Hoseth 75'; Rasch 79' (pen.)	Stadium: Ullern Kunstgress; Referee: Johan Grundt

23 June 2022	Egersund (3)	1–2	(2) Sandnes Ulf	Egersund
18:00 CEST (UTC+2)	Michalsen 55'	Report	Halgunset 59'; Berger 82' (pen.)	Stadium: Idrettsparken; Attendance: 490; Referee: Tore Hansen

23 June 2022	Bjarg (4)	1–4	(2) Sogndal	Bergen
18:00 CEST (UTC+2)	Holst 20'	Report	Kupen 24'; Hoven 29' (pen.); Blårud 50'; Flataker 88'	Stadium: Stavollen Kunstgress; Referee: Sondre Brudvik

23 June 2022	Nardo (4)	0–1	(2) Ranheim	Trondheim
18:00 CEST (UTC+2)		Report	Tønne 67'	Stadium: Nissekollen Kunstgress; Referee: Eskil Hellandsjø-Svedberg

== Third round ==
The draw for the third round was made on 23 June 2022. All the matches were set to be played on 29 and 30 June, but three of them were postponed due to flight cancellations caused by an airline strike.

Number of teams per tier entering this round
Eliteserien (1)	1. divisjon (2)	2. divisjon (3)	3. divisjon (4)	4. divisjon (5)	Total
14 / 16	10 / 16	7 / 28	1 / 84	0 / 272	32 / 416

29 June 2022	Byåsen (4)	1–2	(1) Sandefjord	Trondheim
18:00 CEST (UTC+2)	Horten 62'	Report	Halgunset 25' (o.g.); Ofkir 68'	Stadium: Byåsen Arena; Attendance: 344; Referee: Marius Grøtta

29 June 2022	Kjelsås (3)	3–3 (a.e.t.) (3–4 p)	(2) Skeid	Oslo
18:00 CEST (UTC+2)	Midtskogen 14'; Willumsen 26'; Hanstad 58'	Report; Penalties	Sa'Ad 18'; Romsaas 84'; Buduson 90+1'	Stadium: Grefsen Stadion; Attendance: 961; Referee: Magnus Koløy
	Penalties
	Midtskogen (penalty missed); Halvorsen (penalty scored); Harrison (penalty scored); Gripsgård (penalty scored); Abbas (penalty missed)		(penalty scored) Buduson; (penalty scored) Olsen; (penalty scored) Rise; (penalty scored) Romsaas

29 June 2022	Moss (3)	0–3	(2) Start	Moss
18:00 CEST (UTC+2)		Report	Cresswell 37'; Strande 52' (o.g.); Tønnessen 60'	Stadium: Melløs Stadion; Attendance: 1,000; Referee: Ajdin Medic

29 June 2022	Sotra (3)	0–1	(1) Haugesund	Straume
18:00 CEST (UTC+2)		Report	Samuelsen 58'	Stadium: Straume Stadion; Attendance: 377; Referee: Jan Morten Tennøy

29 June 2022	Eidsvold Turn (3)	1–4	(1) Molde	Eidsvoll
18:00 CEST (UTC+2)	Nesset 40' (pen.)	Report	Linnes 28'; Grødem 66', 90'; Zekhnini 82'	Stadium: Myhrer Stadion; Attendance: 622; Referee: Marius Lien

29 June 2022	Lillestrøm (1)	1–0	(1) Aalesund	Lillestrøm
18:00 CEST (UTC+2)	Friðjónsson 45+1'	Report		Stadium: Åråsen Stadion; Attendance: 3,953; Referee: Rohit Saggi

29 June 2022	Gjøvik-Lyn (3)	0–7	(2) Stabæk	Gjøvik
18:00 CEST (UTC+2)		Report	Orban 12', 32'; Geelmuyden 19' (pen.), 61'; Azemi 67', 89'; Wernersson 86'	Stadium: Gjøvik Stadion; Attendance: 1,350; Referee: Daniel Higraff

29 June 2022	Vålerenga (1)	0–1	(1) Bodø/Glimt	Oslo
20:15 CEST (UTC+2)		Report	Saltnes 90'	Stadium: Intility Arena; Attendance: 3,097; Referee: Sivert Amland

30 June 2022	KFUM Oslo (2)	1–1 (a.e.t.) (4–5 p)	(2) Sogndal	Oslo
18:00 CEST (UTC+2)	Svindland 72'	Report; Penalties	Ørjasæter 64'	Stadium: KFUM Arena; Attendance: 227; Referee: Mohammad Aslam
	Penalties
	Mahnin (penalty scored); Delaveris (penalty scored); Gaye (penalty missed); Hestnes (penalty scored); Hammer (penalty scored); Njie (penalty missed)		(penalty scored) van der Spa; (penalty scored) Michael; (penalty scored) Jónsson; (penalty missed) Gunnarsson; (penalty scored) Kupen; (penalty scored) Flataker

30 June 2022	Sandnes Ulf (2)	0–2	(1) Rosenborg	Sandnes
18:00 CEST (UTC+2)		Report	Holse 26'; Halgunset 59' (o.g.)	Stadium: Øster Hus Arena; Attendance: 2,427; Referee: Kristoffer Hagenes

30 June 2022	Ull/Kisa (3)	0–2	(2) Ranheim	Jessheim
18:00 CEST (UTC+2)		Report	Mehnert 29'; Erlien 51'	Stadium: Jessheim Stadion; Attendance: 412; Referee: Harald Sletner

30 June 2022	Brann (2)	6–0	(2) Fredrikstad	Bergen
19:00 CEST (UTC+2)	Castro 10' (pen.), 42'; Myhre 47', 58'; Heggebø 87'; Wassberg 90'	Report		Stadium: Brann Stadion; Attendance: 3,574; Referee: Svein Sinnes

10 August 2022	Jerv (1)	2–3 (a.e.t.)	(1) Odd	Grimstad
18:00 CEST (UTC+2)	Ugland 17'; Diallo 62'	Report	Ingebrigtsen 2', 45+1'; Jevtović 110'	Stadium: Levermyr Stadion; Attendance: 1,522; Referee: Tore Hansen

17 August 2022	HamKam (1)	0–0 (a.e.t.) (5–6 p)	(1) Tromsø	Hamar
18:00 CEST (UTC+2)		Report; Penalties		Stadium: Briskeby Arena; Attendance: 1,294; Referee: Ola Hobber Nilsen
	Penalties
	Pedersen (penalty missed); Melgalvis (penalty scored); Faerrón (penalty missed); Kuruçay (penalty scored); Hernandez-Foster (penalty scored); Onsrud (penalty scored); Faraas (penalty scored); Jendal (penalty missed)		(penalty missed) Tuominen; (penalty scored) Øyvann; (penalty missed) Vesterlund; (penalty scored) Jenssen; (penalty scored) Opsahl; (penalty scored) Aarflot; (penalty scored) Kamanzi; (penalty scored) Hafstad

28 September 2022	Tromsdalen (3)	0–1	(2) Bryne	Tromsø
18:00 CEST (UTC+2)		Report	Undheim 48'	Stadium: TUIL Arena; Attendance: 250; Referee: Eivind Bodding

12 October 2022	Viking (1)	1–0 (a.e.t.)	(1) Kristiansund	Stavanger
18:00 CEST (UTC+2)	Brekalo 105'	Report		Stadium: Viking Stadion; Attendance: 3,546; Referee: Steinar Hauge

== Fourth round ==
The draw for the fourth round was made on 24 August 2022.

Number of teams per tier entering this round (Note: Note that some teams have changed division since the third round, which was played in 2022)
Eliteserien (1)	1. divisjon (2)	2. divisjon (3)	3. divisjon (4)	4. divisjon (5)	Total
11 / 16	5 / 16	0 / 28	0 / 84	0 / 272	16 / 416

5 March 2023	Ranheim (2)	0–4	(1) Bodø/Glimt	Trondheim
17:00 CET (UTC+1)		Report	Pellegrino 37'; Mvuka 48'; Vetlesen 68'; Sjøvold 85'	Stadium: EXTRA Arena; Attendance: 1,625; Referee: Marius Hansen Grøtta

12 March 2023	Brann (1)	3–1	(1) Haugesund	Bergen
13:00 CET (UTC+1)	Finne 10', 71'; Rasmussen 11'	Report	Christensen 66'	Stadium: Åsane Arena; Attendance: 3,033; Referee: Espen Eskås

12 March 2023	Skeid (2)	1–3	(1) Molde	Lillestrøm
15:00 CET (UTC+1)	Melchior 19'	Report	Brynhildsen 20'; Eriksen 64'; Eikrem 80'	Stadium: LSK-Hallen; Attendance: 732; Referee: Svein Tore Sinnes

12 March 2023	Stabæk (1)	5–0	(2) Bryne	Bærum
15:00 CET (UTC+1)	Høgh 33', 51'; Andresen 48'; Bakenga 79'; Geelmuyden 83'	Report		Stadium: AJ Arena; Attendance: 689; Referee: Sigurd Smehus Kringstad

12 March 2023	Sandefjord (1)	4–1	(1) Odd	Mjøndalen
17:00 CET (UTC+1)	Tveter 4'; Dunsby 10', 26'; Al-Saed 24'	Report	Wallem 81'	Stadium: Consto Arena; Attendance: 397; Referee: Daniel Higraff

12 March 2023	Start (2)	1–1 (a.e.t.) (4–5 p)	(1) Tromsø	Kristiansand
17:00 CET (UTC+1)	Pedersen 35'	Report; Penalties	Erlien 70'	Stadium: Sør Arena; Referee: Sivert Øksnes Amland
	Penalties
	Mares (penalty scored); Ness (penalty scored); Svela (penalty scored); Sjøkvist (penalty scored); Robstad (penalty missed)		(penalty scored) Erlien; (penalty scored) Opsahl; (penalty scored) Diouf; (penalty scored) Vesterlund; (penalty scored) Aarflot

12 March 2023	Sogndal (2)	1–2	(1) Lillestrøm	Sogndalsfjøra
17:00 CET (UTC+1)	Arrocha 31'	Report	Adams 2'; Olsen 71'	Stadium: Fosshaugane Campus; Attendance: 1,409; Referee: Kai Erik Steen

12 March 2023	Viking (1)	2–0	(1) Rosenborg	Stavanger
20:15 CET (UTC+1)	Svendsen 64'; Salvesen 67'	Report		Stadium: Viking Stadion; Attendance: 5,433; Referee: Rohit Saggi

== Quarter-finals ==
The draw for the quarter-finals was made on 19 January 2023.

Number of teams per tier entering this round
Eliteserien (1)	1. divisjon (2)	2. divisjon (3)	3. divisjon (4)	4. divisjon (5)	Total
8 / 16	0 / 16	0 / 28	0 / 84	0 / 272	8 / 416

18 March 2023	Stabæk (1)	1–1 (a.e.t.) (9–8 p)	(1) Molde	Bærum
13:30 CET (UTC+1)	Høgh 84'	Report; Penalties	Berisha 30' (pen.)	Stadium: AJ Arena; Attendance: 900; Referee: Tore Hansen
	Penalties
	Geelmuyden (penalty missed); Bakenga (penalty scored); Haugen (penalty scored); Krogstad (penalty missed); Næss (penalty scored); Pettersson (penalty scored); Pedersen (penalty scored); Skovgaard (penalty scored); Edwards (penalty scored); Jenssen (penalty missed); Riise (penalty scored); Bakenga (penalty scored)		(penalty scored) Risa; (penalty missed) Brynhildsen; (penalty scored) Grødem; (penalty scored) Breivik; (penalty missed) Hansen; (penalty scored) Haugan; (penalty scored) Hagelskjær; (penalty scored) Linnes; (penalty scored) Karlstrøm; (penalty missed) Knudtzon; (penalty scored) Ødegård; (penalty missed) Grødem

18 March 2023	Bodø/Glimt (1)	5–3	(1) Viking	Bodø
16:15 CET (UTC+1)	Espejord 52', 81'; Žugelj 70', 75'; Pellegrino 90+1'	Report	Tripić 35'; Stensness 45'; Salvesen 59'	Stadium: Aspmyra Stadion; Referee: Kristoffer Hagenes

19 March 2023	Tromsø (1)	2–3 (a.e.t.)	(1) Lillestrøm	Tromsø
17:00 CET (UTC+1)	Opsahl 32'; Mikaelsson 60'	Report	Olsen 48'; Åsen 71'; Jenssen 111' (o.g.)	Stadium: Alfheim Stadion; Attendance: 2,331; Referee: Ola Hobber Nilsen

19 March 2023	Brann (1)	3–0	(1) Sandefjord	Bergen
20:00 CET (UTC+1)	Myhre 21'; Wolfe 25'; Rasmussen 37'	Report		Stadium: Åsane Arena; Attendance: 2,243; Referee: Tom Harald Hagen

== Semi-finals ==
The draw for the semi-finals was made on 19 January 2023.

Number of teams per tier entering this round
Eliteserien (1)	1. divisjon (2)	2. divisjon (3)	3. divisjon (4)	4. divisjon (5)	Total
4 / 16	0 / 16	0 / 28	0 / 84	0 / 272	4 / 416

26 April 2023	Stabæk (1)	0–2	(1) Brann	Bærum
18:00 CEST (UTC+2)		Report	Heggebø 20'; Finne 59'	Stadium: Nadderud Stadion; Attendance: 4,560; Referee: Rohit Saggi

26 April 2023	Lillestrøm (1)	1–0	(1) Bodø/Glimt	Lillestrøm
20:15 CEST (UTC+2)	Olsen 45'	Report		Stadium: Åråsen Stadion; Attendance: 6,200; Referee: Espen Eskås

== Final ==
The final was played on 20 May 2023.

20 May 2023
16:00 CEST (UTC+2)

Brann	2–0	Lillestrøm
Blomberg 16'; Finne 62'	Report

Ullevaal Stadion, Oslo
Attendance: 25,532
Referee: Tore Hansen (Feda)

== Top scorers ==
As of 20 May 2023

Rank	Player	Club	Goals
1	(Norway) Bård Finne	Brann	11
2	(England) Cameron Cresswell	Start	5
2	(Iceland) Hólmbert Friðjónsson	Lillestrøm	5
4	(Norway) Alexander Dang	Øygarden	4
4	(Norway) Marcus Mehnert	Ranheim	4
4	(Norway) Emil Grønn Pedersen	Fløy, Start	4
4	(Norway) Kent Malic Swaleh	Tromsdalen	4
