= Jesper Taaje =

Norwegian footballer (born 1997)

Personal information
- Date of birth: 25 October 1997 (age 29)
- Height: 1.92 m (6 ft 4 in)
- Position: Defender

Team information
- Current team: Strømsgodset
- Number: 25

Youth career
- –2016: Hallingdal

Senior career*
Years	Team	Apps	(Gls)
2013–2016	Hallingdal	77	(18)
2016–2020	Kjelsås	72	(7)
2020	HamKam	12	(2)
2021	KFUM Oslo	29	(8)
2022–2024	Sandefjord	53	(6)
2024–	Strømsgodset	79	(9)
- * Club domestic league appearances and goals as of 14 November 2026

Jesper Taaje (born 25 October 1997) is a Norwegian footballer who plays as a defender for Strømsgodset.

== Career ==
Hailing from Hemsedal, Taaje started his career with Hallingdal. In 2016, he moved to Oslo-based Kjelsås. After four years with Kjelsås, he joined HamKam in the summer of 2020. He stayed with HamKam for half a season, before moving to KFUM Oslo in 2021. In January 2022, he joined Sandefjord. On 3 April 2022, he made his Eliteserien debut in a 3–1 win against Haugesund.

== Career statistics ==
As of 14 November 2026

Appearances and goals by club, season and competition
Club	Season	League			National cup		Other		Total	
Club	Season	Division	Apps	Goals	Apps	Goals	Apps	Goals	Apps	Goals
Hallingdal	2013	4. divisjon	19	4	0	0	—		19	4
Hallingdal	2014	4. divisjon	23	10	0	0	—		23	10
Hallingdal	2015	3. divisjon	23	2	3	1	—		26	3
Hallingdal	2016	3. divisjon	12	2	1	0	—		13	2
Hallingdal	Total		77	18	4	1	0	0	81	19
Kjelsås	2016	PostNord-ligaen	1	0	0	0	—		1	0
Kjelsås	2017	PostNord-ligaen	9	0	1	0	—		10	0
Kjelsås	2018	PostNord-ligaen	26	4	2	1	—		28	5
Kjelsås	2019	PostNord-ligaen	24	3	2	0	—		26	3
Kjelsås	2020	PostNord-ligaen	12	0	0	0	—		12	0
Kjelsås	Total		72	7	5	1	0	0	77	8
HamKam	2020	OBOS-ligaen	12	2	0	0	—		12	2
KFUM Oslo	2021	OBOS-ligaen	29	8	3	0	3 (Note: Appearances in OBOS-ligaen promotion play-offs)	0	35	8
Sandefjord	2022	Eliteserien	27	2	3	0	2 (Note: Appearances in Eliteserien relegation play-offs)	0	32	2
Sandefjord	2023	Eliteserien	26	4	0	0	—		26	4
Sandefjord	Total		53	6	3	0	2	0	58	6
Strømsgodset	2024	Eliteserien	28	1	3	0	0	0	31	1
Strømsgodset	2025	Eliteserien	25	4	2	0	0	0	27	4
Strømsgodset	2026	Norwegian First Division	26	4	1	0	0	0	27	4
Strømsgodset	Total		79	9	6	0	0	0	85	9
Career total			322	50	21	2	5	0	348	52
