= Hugo Keto =

Finnish footballer (born 1998)

Personal information
- Full name: Hugo Oliver Keto
- Date of birth: 9 February 1998 (age 28)
- Place of birth: Helsinki, Finland
- Height: 1.92 m (6 ft 4 in)
- Position: Goalkeeper

Team information
- Current team: IFK Värnamo
- Number: 1

Youth career
- 2010–2012: Honka
- 2013–2014: HJK
- 2014–2018: Arsenal
- 2018–2020: Brighton & Hove Albion

Senior career*
Years	Team	Apps	(Gls)
2019	Brighton & Hove Albion	0	(0)
2019	→ Waterford (loan)	2	(0)
2020	Klubi 04	3	(0)
2020–2021	HJK	28	(0)
2022–2024	Sandefjord	69	(0)
2025–	IFK Värnamo	56	(0)

International career^{‡}
2014	Finland U17	3	(0)
2015–2017	Finland U19	7	(0)
2017–2020	Finland U21	9	(0)
- * Club domestic league appearances and goals as of 12 November 2026 ‡ National team caps and goals as of 8 October 2023

Hugo Oliver Keto (born 9 February 1998) is a Finnish professional footballer who plays a goalkeeper for Superettan club IFK Värnamo.

== Career ==
=== Arsenal ===
On 4 July 2014, Keto joined the youth academy of English Premier League side Arsenal.

=== Brighton ===
On 9 July 2018, he joined the youth academy of Brighton in the English Premier League.

=== Waterford (loan) ===
On 12 February 2019, he was sent on loan to Republic of Ireland club Waterford.

=== HJK ===
On 6 June 2020, Keto returned to Finland and signed for HJK Helsinki in Veikkausliiga.

=== Sandefjord ===
On 24 January 2022, he signed a three-year contract with Eliteserien club Sandefjord in Norway.

=== IFK Värnamo ===
On 26 January 2025, Keto joined Swedish Allsvenskan club IFK Värnamo on a three-year deal until the end of 2027.

== International career ==
Keto is a former regular youth international for Finland. He was first called up to the Finland senior national team in January 2018 for a friendly match against Jordan, but remained an unused substitute. He also received call ups in October and November 2023 for UEFA Euro 2024 qualifying matches.

== Career statistics ==
As of 12 November 2026

Appearances and goals by club, season and competition
Club	Season	League			National cup (Note: Includes Finnish Cup, Norwegian Cup and Svenska Cupen)		Europe		Other		Total	
Club	Season	Division	Apps	Goals	Apps	Goals	Apps	Goals	Apps	Goals	Apps	Goals
Brighton & Hove Albion U21	2018–19	—							1 (Note: Appearance in EFL Trophy)	0	1	0
Waterford (loan)	2019	LOI Premier Division	2	0	0	0	—		1 (Note: Appearance in League of Ireland Cup)	0	3	0
Klubi 04	2020	Kakkonen	3	0	0	0	—		—		3	0
HJK	2020	Veikkausliiga	7	0	0	0	—		—		7	0
HJK	2021	Veikkausliiga	21	0	6	0	6 (Note: Appearances in UEFA Europa Conference League)	0	—		33	0
HJK	Total		28	0	6	0	6	0	—		40	0
Sandefjord	2022	Eliteserien	10	0	3	0	—		—		13	0
Sandefjord	2023	Eliteserien	30	0	2	0	—		—		32	0
Sandefjord	2024	Eliteserien	29	0	0	0	—		—		29	0
Sandefjord	Total		69	0	5	0	—		—		74	0
Sandefjord 2	2022	4. divisjon	1	0	—		—		—		1	0
IFK Värnamo	2025	Allsvenskan	27	0	2	0	—		—		29	0
IFK Värnamo	2026	Superettan	29	0	3	0	—		—		32	0
IFK Värnamo	Total		56	0	5	0	—		—		61	0
Career total			159	0	16	0	6	0	2	0	183	0
