= Franklin Nyenetue =

Liberian footballer (born 2000)

Personal information
- Full name: Franklin Daliba Nyenetue
- Date of birth: 16 November 2000 (age 25)
- Place of birth: Liberia
- Height: 1.77 m (5 ft 10 in)
- Position: Forward

Team information
- Current team: Ranheim
- Number: 17

Youth career
- –2013: Tangmoen
- 2014–2015: Stjørdals-Blink
- 2016–2020: Kristiansund

Senior career*
Years	Team	Apps	(Gls)
2020	Rosenborg	0	(0)
2020	→ Stjørdals-Blink (loan)	9	(1)
2021–2023	Sandefjord	73	(8)
2024–2026	Kristiansund	18	(0)
2025	→ Egersund (loan)	8	(1)
2026	→ Ranheim (loan)	13	(2)
2026	Dila Gori	0	(0)
2026–	Ranheim	12	(2)

International career^{‡}
2026–	Liberia	3	(1)
- * Club domestic league appearances and goals as of 14 November 2026 ‡ National team caps and goals as of 13 November 2026

Franklin Daliba "Daddy's Boy" Nyenetue (born 16 November 2000) is a Liberian professional footballer who plays for Norwegian club Ranheim and the Liberia national team.

== Club career ==
Hailing from Stjørdal Municipality, he started his career in Tangmoen IL and played football for IL Stjørdals-Blink before joining Rosenborg BK's boys under-16 team. For Rosenborg's senior team, he appeared once on the bench before being loaned out in the latter half of 2020 to Stjørdals-Blink. Ahead of the 2021 season he was picked up by Sandefjord Fotball, where he made his Eliteserien debut in May 2021 against Mjøndalen.

== International career ==
On 25 September 2026, Nyenetue made his debut for the Liberia national team in an AFCON qualifier against Rwanda.

== Personal life ==
On the middle name "Daddys Boy", he explained that he was originally named Daliba, growing up in Liberia. It was changed upon his arrival with his family in Norway at the age of 3.

== Career statistics ==
=== Club ===
As of 5 September 2026

Appearances and goals by club, season and competition
Club	Season	League			National Cup		Other		Total	
Club	Season	Division	Apps	Goals	Apps	Goals	Apps	Goals	Apps	Goals
Rosenborg	2020	Eliteserien	0	0	0	0	—		0	0
Stjørdals-Blink (loan)	2020	1. divisjon	9	1	0	0	1 (Note: Appearance in 1. divisjon relegation play-offs)	0	10	1
Sandefjord	2021	Eliteserien	23	0	2	1	—		25	1
Sandefjord	2022	Eliteserien	27	2	3	1	2 (Note: Appearances in Eliteserien play-offs)	1	32	4
Sandefjord	2023	Eliteserien	23	6	1	0	—		24	6
Sandefjord	Total		73	8	6	2	2	1	81	11
Kristiansund	2024	Eliteserien	16	0	3	0	0	0	19	0
Kristiansund	2025	Eliteserien	2	0	4	0	0	0	6	0
Kristiansund	Total		18	0	7	0	0	0	25	0
Egersund (loan)	2025	1. divisjon	8	1	3	0	0	0	11	1
Ranheim (loan)	2026	1. divisjon	13	2	0	0	0	0	13	2
Dila Gori	2026	Erovnuli Liga	0	0	2	0	2	0	4	0
Ranheim	2026	1. divisjon	3	2	1	1	0	0	4	3
Career total			128	15	19	3	5	1	152	19

=== International ===
As of match played 13 November 2026

Appearances and goals by national team and year
National team	Year	Apps	Goals
Liberia	2026	3	1
Total		3	1

Scores and results list Liberia's goal tally first, score column indicates score after each Nyenetue goal.

List of international goals scored by Franklin Nyenetue
No.	Date	Venue	Opponent	Score	Result	Competition
1	13 November 2026	Estádio Nacional de Cabo Verde, Praia, Cape Verde	Cape Verde	1–1	2–4	2027 Africa Cup of Nations qualification
