= Gjøvik Stadion =

Norwegian multi-purpose stadium located in Gjøvik, Innlandet, Norway

Coordinates: 60°47′58″N 10°40′55″E

Gjøvik Stadion is a multi-purpose stadium located in Gjøvik, Norway.

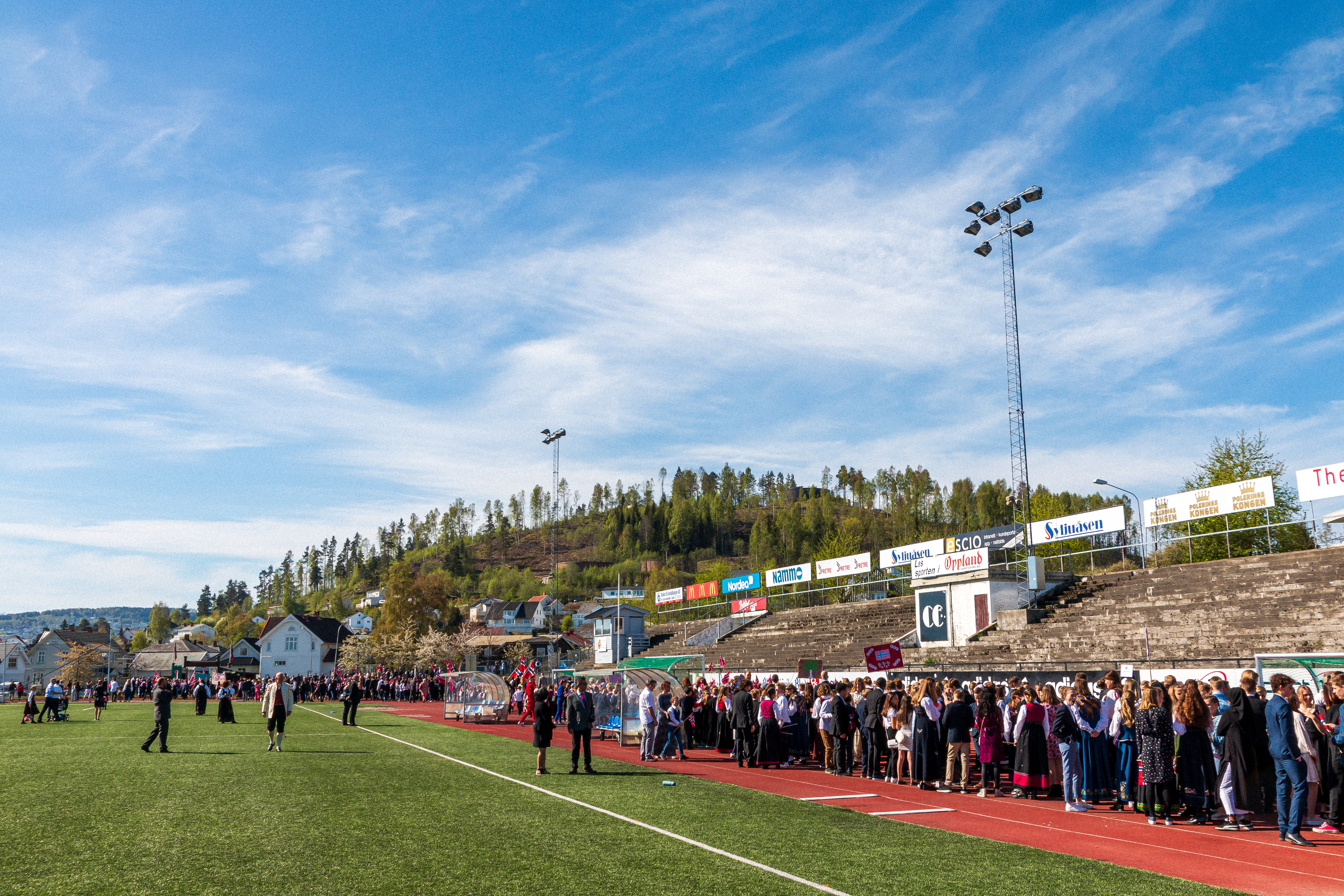
Gjøvik Stadion

The municipal complex is the home venue of football club FK Gjøvik-Lyn. The stadium opened in 1910. The venue hosted one match in the 1963–64 European Cup Winners' Cup, where Gjøvik/Lyn played APOEL F.C.

It was used as a speed skating venue until 1994, when it received all-weather running track. The venue hosted the Norwegian Athletics Championships in 1964.
