= Danilo Al-Saed =

Iraqi footballer

Personal information
- Full name: Danilo Andrés Al-Saed Alvarado
- Date of birth: 24 February 1999 (age 27)
- Place of birth: Bålsta, Sweden
- Height: 1.78 m (5 ft 10 in)
- Position: Midfielder

Team information
- Current team: HamKam
- Number: 24

Youth career
- FC Järfälla
- Spånga IS FK
- Håbo FF

Senior career*
Years	Team	Apps	(Gls)
2015–2017	Håbo	53	(10)
2018	Arameisk-Syrianska	0	(0)
2018–2019	Håbo	26	(15)
2020	Enköping	13	(6)
2021–2022	Sandviken	54	(9)
2023–2024	Sandefjord	36	(12)
2024–2025	Heerenveen	6	(0)
2025	→ AIK (loan)	0	(0)
2025–	BK Häcken	13	(0)
2026–	→ HamKam (loan)	4	(1)

International career^{‡}
2023–	Iraq	5	(0)
- * Club domestic league appearances and goals as of 31 August 2026 ‡ National team caps and goals as of 10 September 2024

Danilo Andrés Al-Saed Alvarado (born 24 February 1999) is a professional footballer who plays as a left winger for HamKam, on loan from BK Häcken. Born in Sweden, he plays for the Iraq national team.

== Club career ==
Following a slow career progress, he took a year off football and started again in the sixth tier, Division 4. He eventually moved up the football system to Enköpings SK FK and then Sandvikens IF. A foreign club also showed interest for Al-Saed, this being Norwegian IK Start, but the move did not materialize. Al-Saed stayed in Sandviken, and did not play competitively for Iraq U23 either, stating that his father advised against it.

The move to Norway came one year later, to Sandefjord during the winter transfer window. Performing well in the initial third of the season, with four goals and one assist in ten games, IFK Göteborg were reportedly interested in him.

On 10 January 2025, Al-Saed joined AIK in Sweden on loan until 30 June 2025, with an option to buy.

On 16 July 2025, Al-Saed joined BK Häcken on a contract until end of 2028.

On 21 July 2026, Al-Saed joined Norwegian side HamKam on a loan-deal.

== International career ==
In early 2022, Al-Saed was invited to a training camp for the Iraqi U23 national team.

In October 2023, Al-Saed received his first call-up to the Iraqi senior national team for the 2023 Jordan International Tournament.

== Personal life ==
Al-Saed hails from Bålsta, and is the son of an Iraqi father and Chilean mother.
