= Ian Smeulers =

Dutch footballer

Personal information
- Date of birth: 12 January 2000 (age 26)
- Place of birth: Barendrecht, Netherlands
- Height: 1.77 m (5 ft 10 in)
- Position: Left-back

Team information
- Current team: Volos
- Number: 3

Youth career
- 2006–2019: Feyenoord

Senior career*
Years	Team	Apps	(Gls)
2019–2021	Feyenoord	0	(0)
2019–2020	→ Dordrecht (loan)	3	(0)
2021	→ Willem II (loan)	5	(0)
2021–2023	Sandefjord	53	(0)
2023–2024	Excelsior	6	(0)
2024–	Volos	4	(0)

International career^{‡}
2016–2017	Netherlands U17	7	(0)
2017–2018	Netherlands U18	3	(0)
2018	Netherlands U19	2	(0)
- * Club domestic league appearances and goals as of 7 December 2024 ‡ National team caps and goals as of 00:19, 14 March 2021 (UTC)

Ian Smeulers (born 12 January 2000) is a Dutch professional footballer who plays as a left-back for Greek Super League club Volos.

== Career ==
Smeulders began playing football at the youth academy of Feyenoord in 2006. He began his senior career on loan with Dordrecht for the 2019–20 season. Smeulders made his professional debut with Dordrecht in a 1–1 Eerste Divisie tie with Roda on 15 November 2019. He was loaned to Willem II in the Eredivisie on 1 February 2021.

On 21 August 2023, Smeulers signed a contract with Excelsior for one year, with an option for a second year.
