= Albin Winbo =

Swedish footballer

Personal information
- Full name: Albin Eric Winbo
- Date of birth: 27 October 1997 (age 29)
- Position: Midfielder

Team information
- Current team: Varbergs BoIS
- Number: 8

Senior career*
Years	Team	Apps	(Gls)
2017–2019	Tvååkers IF	77	(16)
2020–2022	Varbergs BoIS	60	(3)
2022	→ Sandefjord (loan)	13	(1)
2023	Cork City	7	(0)
2024	Östersund	3	(0)
2024–	Varbergs BoIS	57	(4)
- * Club domestic league appearances and goals as of 11 November 2026

Albin Eric Winbo (born 27 October 1997) is a Swedish professional footballer who plays as a midfielder for Varbergs BoIS.

== Club career ==
Winbo joined Cork City in January 2023.

On 27 April 2024, Winbo signed with Östersund.
