= Aleksander Damnjanović Nilsson =

Swedish footballer (born 2002)

Personal information
- Full name: Freddy Aleksander Damnjanović Nilsson
- Date of birth: 5 September 2002 (age 24)
- Place of birth: Malmö, Sweden
- Height: 1.78 m (5 ft 10 in)
- Position: Midfielder

Team information
- Current team: Halmstad
- Number: 25

Youth career
- –2021: Malmö FF

Senior career*
Years	Team	Apps	(Gls)
2021–2022	Malmö FF	0	(0)
2021	→ Jammerbugt (loan)	13	(0)
2022	→ Sandefjord (loan)	15	(0)
2022–2024	Sandefjord	39	(5)
2025–	Halmstad	19	(0)

International career^{‡}
2017	Sweden U15	4	(0)
2018	Sweden U16	7	(0)
2018–2019	Sweden U17	15	(1)
2020	Sweden U18	2	(0)
- * Club domestic league appearances and goals as of 9 July 2026 ‡ National team caps and goals as of 14 April 2022

Freddy Aleksander Damnjanović Nilsson (born 5 September 2002) is a Swedish footballer who plays as a midfielder for Halmstad.

== Club career ==
Born in Malmö, Damnjanović Nilsson started his career with Malmö FF. In the fall of 2021, he was loaned out to Jammerbugt in Denmark. In March 2022, he moved to Sandefjord on loan until August 2022. When the loan ended, he joined the club permanently with a contract until the end of the 2024 season. On 3 April 2022, he made his Eliteserien debut in a 3–1 win against Haugesund.

== International career ==
Damnjanović Nilsson has represented Sweden from under-15 to under-18 level.
