= Willis Furtado =

Footballer (born 1997)

Personal information
- Full name: Willis Alvés Furtado
- Date of birth: 4 September 1997 (age 29)
- Place of birth: Ivry-sur-Seine, France
- Height: 1.82 m (6 ft 0 in)
- Position: Winger

Team information
- Current team: Olbia
- Number: 11

Senior career*
Years	Team	Apps	(Gls)
2015–2016	Ivry	2	(1)
2016–2017	Stenhousemuir	29	(6)
2017–2018	Airdrieonians	18	(6)
2018	Raith Rovers	16	(3)
2018–2020	Masr	28	(1)
2021–2022	Jerv	47	(12)
2023	KTP	26	(6)
2024	Floriana	14	(8)
2024–	Olbia	51	(12)

International career^{‡}
2020–	Cape Verde	8	(0)
- * Club domestic league appearances and goals as of 20 March 2026 ‡ National team caps and goals as of 27 April 2023

Willis Alvés Furtado (born 4 September 1997) is a professional footballer who plays as a winger for Serie D club Olbia. Born in France, he plays for the Cape Verde national team.

== Club career ==
Furtado spent his early career in France and Scotland before moving to FC Masr in Egypt. He made his debut with Masr in a 3–0 Egyptian Premier League win over El Entag El Harby on 22 September 2020.

On 12 February 2023, Furtado signed a one-year contract with Finnish club KTP.

On 4 January 2024, he joined Maltese Premier League club Floriana on a free transfer.

On 31 August 2024, Furtado signed 2 years contract with Italian club Olbia Calcio 1905.

== International career ==
Furtado was born in France and is Cape Verdean by descent. He was called up to the represent the Cape Verde senior national team for a set of friendlies in October 2020. He debuted for Cape Verde in a 2–1 friendly win over Andorra on 7 October 2020.

== Career statistics ==
As of 21 November 2024.

Appearances and goals by club, season and competition
Club	Season	League			National cup (Note: Includes Scottish Cup, Egypt Cup, Norwegian Cup, Suomen Cup and Maltese FA Trophy)		Other		Total	
Club	Season	Division	Apps	Goals	Apps	Goals	Apps	Goals	Apps	Goals
Ivry	2015–16	National 3	2	1	–		–		2	1
Stenhousemuir	2016–17	Scottish League One	29	6	3	1	0	0	32	7
Airdrieonians	2017–18	Scottish League One	18	6	1	0	–		19	6
Raith Rovers	2017–18	Scottish League One	18	3	–		–		18	3
Masr	2018–19	Egyptian Second Division								
Masr	2019–20	Egyptian Premier League	28	1	2	2	–		30	3
Masr	Total		28	1	2	2	–	–	30	3
Jerv	2021	1. divisjon	31	10	2	0	–		33	10
Jerv	2022	Eliteserien	18	2	3	2	–		21	4
Jerv	Total		49	12	5	2	–	–	54	14
KTP	2023	Veikkausliiga	26	6	2	0	4 (Note: Includes Finnish League Cup)	1	32	7
Floriana	2023–24	Maltese Premier League	14	8	4	2	–		18	10
Olbia	2024–25	Serie D	51	12	0	0	–		11	2
Career total			235	56	17	7	4	1	216	54
