= Mohamed Ofkir =

Norwegian footballer (born 1996)

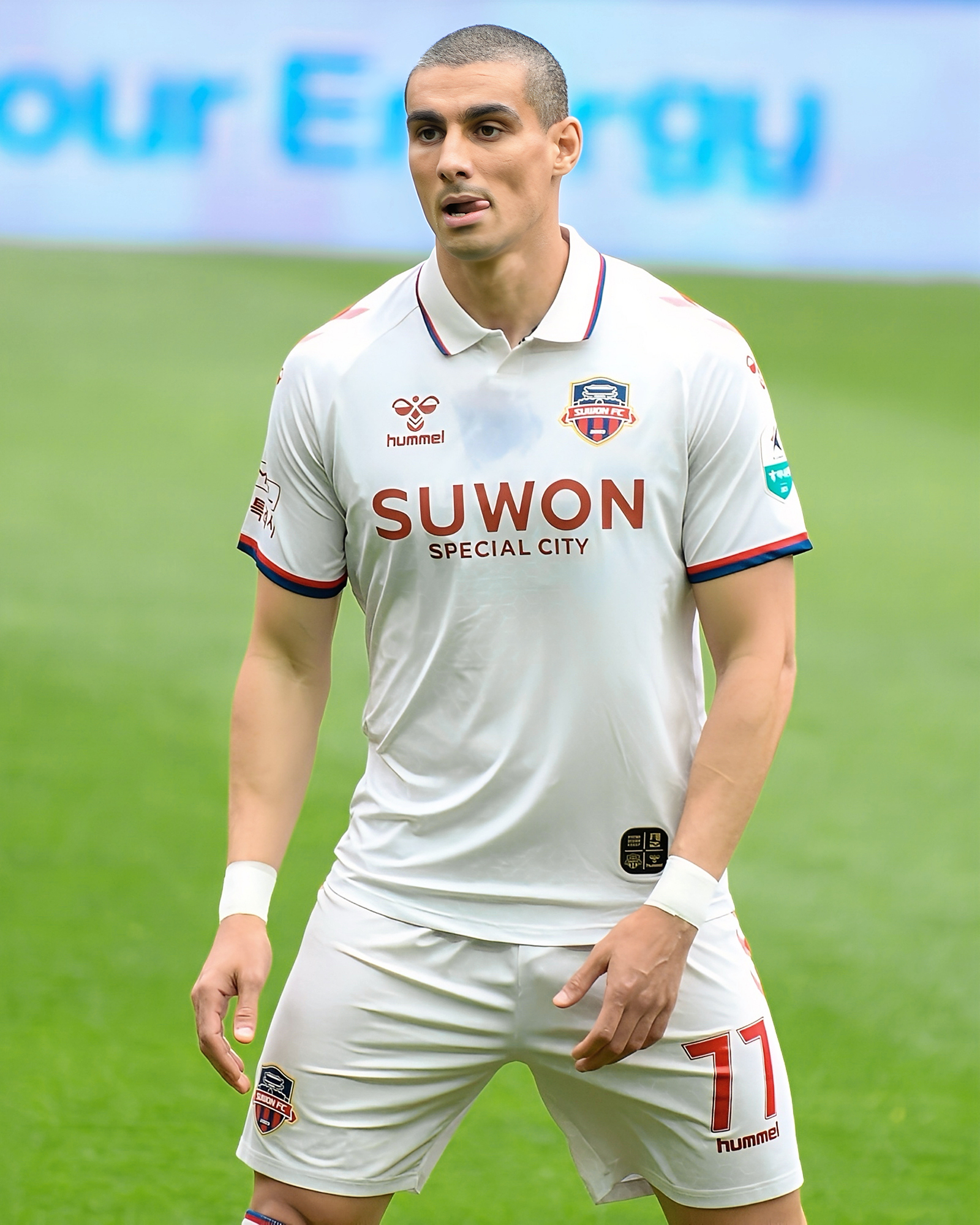
- Ofkir with Suwon in 2025

Personal information
- Date of birth: 4 August 1996 (age 30)
- Place of birth: Oslo, Norway
- Height: 1.78 m (5 ft 10 in)
- Position: Left winger

Team information
- Current team: HamKam
- Number: 11

Youth career
- Rommen
- –2012: Vålerenga
- 2013–2014: Lillestrøm

Senior career*
Years	Team	Apps	(Gls)
2015–2017	Lillestrøm	35	(3)
2017–2018	Sporting Lokeren	9	(0)
2018–2020	Sandefjord	49	(5)
2020–2021	Sarpsborg 08	32	(1)
2022–2023	Sandefjord	30	(12)
2023–2026	Vålerenga	43	(6)
2024	→ Manisa (loan)	11	(0)
2024	→ HamKam (loan)	14	(1)
2025	→ Suwon (loan)	10	(0)
2026–	HamKam	2	(1)
- * Club domestic league appearances and goals as of 13 September 2026

Mohamed Ofkir (born 4 August 1996) is a Norwegian professional footballer who plays for Eliteserien club HamKam.

== Professional career ==
He started his youth career in Rommen SK. He went on to play for Vålerenga, before joining the junior ranks of Lillestrøm. He made his first-team debut in a friendly match in 2014, even scoring a goal. He made his Norwegian Premier League debut in April 2015 against Aalesund.

During winter transferwindow of 2017 his former coach at Lilleström SK, Runar Kristinsson signed him for Belgian side Sporting Lokeren, where he signed a contract for 2.5 years.

In January 2023, Ofkir signed for Vålerenga on a four-year contract, returning to the club he had spent time at as a youth.

On 27 January 2025, Ofkir joined Suwon FC of K League 1 of South Korea.

== Personal life ==
Ofkir is of Moroccan descent.

== Career statistics ==
As of match played 13 September 2026

Appearances and goals by club, season and competition
Club	Season	League			Cup		Total	
Club	Season	Division	Apps	Goals	Apps	Goals	Apps	Goals
Lillestrøm	2015	Eliteserien	12	0	0	0	12	0
Lillestrøm	2016	Eliteserien	23	3	3	1	26	4
Lillestrøm	Total		35	3	3	1	38	4
Sporting Lokeren	2016–17	Belgian First Division A	9	0	0	0	9	0
Sporting Lokeren	2017–18	Belgian First Division A	0	0	0	0	0	0
Sporting Lokeren	Total		9	0	0	0	9	0
Sandefjord	2018	Eliteserien	21	3	2	1	23	4
Sandefjord	2019	Norwegian First Division	28	2	3	2	31	4
Sandefjord	Total		49	5	5	3	54	8
Sarpsborg 08	2020	Eliteserien	25	1	—		25	1
Sarpsborg 08	2021	Eliteserien	7	0	1	0	8	0
Sarpsborg 08	Total		32	1	1	0	33	1
Sandefjord	2022	Eliteserien	29	12	3	2	32	14
Vålerenga	2023	Eliteserien	27	2	6	4	33	6
Vålerenga	2025	Eliteserien	10	2	1	0	11	2
Vålerenga	2026	Eliteserien	6	2	0	0	6	2
Vålerenga	Total		43	5	7	4	50	9
Manisa (loan)	2023-24	TFF First League	11	0	0	0	11	0
HamKam (loan)	2024	Eliteserien	14	1	0	0	14	1
Suwon (loan)	2025	K League 1	10	0	1	0	11	0
HamKam	2026	Eliteserien	2	1	0	0	2	1
Career total			234	29	20	10	254	39
