= Vetle Walle Egeli =

Norwegian footballer (born 2004)

Personal information
- Date of birth: 23 June 2004 (age 22)
- Place of birth: Larvik, Norway
- Height: 1.73 m (5 ft 8 in)
- Position: Midfielder

Team information
- Current team: Sandefjord
- Number: 3

Youth career
- Nanset
- 2019–2021: Sandefjord

Senior career*
Years	Team	Apps	(Gls)
2021–2022	Sandefjord 2	13	(4)
2021–	Sandefjord	95	(2)

International career^{‡}
2021	Norway U17	4	(0)
2022	Norway U18	11	(0)
2023	Norway U19	8	(0)
2023	Norway U20	2	(0)
2024–	Norway U21	3	(0)
- * Club domestic league appearances and goals as of 17 July 2026 ‡ National team caps and goals as of 18 November 2025

Vetle Walle Egeli (born 23 June 2004) is a Norwegian footballer who plays as a midfielder for Sandefjord.

== Club career ==
Born in Larvik, Egeli spent his youth career with the academies of Nanset IF and Sandefjord. After the Sandefjord squad was hit with injuries, Egeli was given the chance in the first team.

== International career ==
Egeli has represented Norway at under-17, under-18, under-19, under-20 and under-21 level.

== Personal life ==
Egeli is the brother of fellow professional footballer Sindre Walle Egeli.

== Career statistics ==
=== Club ===
As of 17 July 2026.

Club	Season	League			Cup		Continental		Other		Total	
Club	Season	Division	Apps	Goals	Apps	Goals	Apps	Goals	Apps	Goals	Apps	Goals
Sandefjord 2	2021	4. divisjon	5	1	–		–		1 (Note: Appearances in the promotion playoffs)	0	6	1
Sandefjord 2	2022	4. divisjon	8	3	–		–		0	0	8	3
Sandefjord 2	Total		13	4	0	0	0	0	1	0	14	4
Sandefjord	2021	Eliteserien	3	0	2 (Note: Appearances in the Norwegian Cup)	0	–		0	0	5	0
Sandefjord	2022	Eliteserien	8	0	3	1	–		0	0	11	1
Sandefjord	2023	Eliteserien	27	1	2	0	–		0	0	29	1
Sandefjord	2024	Eliteserien	20	0	1	0	–		0	0	21	0
Sandefjord	2025	Eliteserien	25	1	1	1	–		0	0	26	1
Sandefjord	2026	Eliteserien	12	0	0	1	–		0	0	12	0
Sandefjord	Total		95	2	9	2	0	0	0	0	104	4
Career total			108	6	9	2	0	0	1	0	118	8
