= Quint Jansen =

Dutch footballer (born 1990)

Personal information
- Full name: Quint Arie Jansen
- Date of birth: 10 September 1990 (age 36)
- Place of birth: Zaandam, Netherlands
- Height: 1.93 m (6 ft 4 in)
- Position: Centre-back

Team information
- Current team: TOP Oss
- Number: 4

Senior career*
| Years | Team | Apps | (Gls) |
| 2008–2014 | Hellas Sport | 148 | (46) |
| 2014 | Junkeren | 8 | (1) |
| 2015–2016 | Finnsnes | 52 | (4) |
| 2017–2020 | Mjøndalen | 93 | (8) |
| 2021 | Aalesund | 30 | (2) |
| 2022 | Sandefjord | 24 | (2) |
| 2023 | Mjøndalen | 13 | (1) |
| 2023–2024 | Othellos Athienou | 39 | (1) |
| 2024 | Castelnuovo Vomano | | |
| 2024–2025 | Brindisi | 19 | (4) |
| 2025 | Acireale | 8 | (0) |
| 2026 | Koninklijke HFC | 7 | (0) |
| 2026– | TOP Oss | 3 | (0) |
- * Club domestic league appearances and goals as of 27 May 2024

Quint Arie Jansen (born 10 September 1990) is a Dutch professional footballer who plays as a centre-back for Eerste Divisie club TOP Oss.

== Career ==
=== Norway ===
Jansen started out in Dutch amateur football with Hellas Sport. In 2014 he moved to Norway and joined Junkeren of the fourth-tier 3. divisjon, and ahead of the 2015 season he signed for Finnsnes in the third-tier 2. divisjon, where he spent two seasons as a centre-back. His form in the 2. divisjon drew interest from Eliteserien clubs and he trialled with Tromsø and Viking, but no contract followed, the trial at Viking having been cut short by an injury.

On 6 February 2017, Jansen signed a two-year contract with Mjøndalen of the 1. divisjon, who had been looking for an aerially strong centre-back in their push for promotion. After early injury problems he became a regular, and in March 2018 he was made vice-captain behind Christian Gauseth. Mjøndalen won promotion to the Eliteserien that year, and over four seasons Jansen made 105 appearances and scored 11 goals before leaving when his contract expired after the 2020 season.

On 29 April 2021, Jansen signed with Aalesund for the remainder of the season, and the club won promotion to the Eliteserien. His contract was not renewed, and in February 2022 he joined Sandefjord of the Eliteserien on a two-year deal. He played in most of Sandefjord's league matches in 2022, and on 30 March 2023 he returned to Mjøndalen, by then back in the 1. divisjon, for whom he made 13 league appearances that season.

=== Cyprus and Italy ===
In the summer of 2023, Jansen signed for Othellos Athienou of the Cypriot First Division, where he played 40 league matches in the 2023–24 season.

In September 2024 he moved to Italy with Castelnuovo Vomano of the Eccellenza Abruzzo, and in December 2024 he joined Brindisi in Serie D, for whom he played 19 league matches and scored four goals in the second half of the season. On 19 August 2025 he signed for fellow Serie D club Acireale.

=== Return to the Netherlands ===
In March 2026, after more than a decade abroad, Jansen returned to the Netherlands and signed with Koninklijke HFC of the Tweede Divisie for the remainder of the season, making seven league appearances for the Haarlem club.

Without a club in the summer of 2026, Jansen trained with the team run by the Dutch players' union VVCS for players without a contract. On 6 August 2026 he signed a one-year contract with Eerste Divisie club TOP Oss, taking the number 4 shirt. Having played in the Netherlands only at amateur level until then, he made his debut in Dutch professional football the following day at the age of 35, coming on as a substitute in a 2–1 home defeat by NAC Breda.
