= Keanin Ayer =

South African footballer

Personal information
- Full name: Keanin Ayer Boya
- Date of birth: 21 April 2000 (age 26)
- Place of birth: Eldorado Park, South Africa
- Height: 1.72 m (5 ft 8 in)
- Position: Midfielder

Team information
- Current team: Siwelele
- Number: 25

Youth career
- –2018: Right to Dream Academy

Senior career*
Years	Team	Apps	(Gls)
2018–2021	Varbergs BoIS	60	(3)
2022–2023	Sandefjord	42	(5)
2024	Næstved	12	(0)
2024–	Siwelele	4	(0)
- * Club domestic league appearances and goals as of 30 September 2024

Keanin Ayer Boya (born 21 April 2000) is a South African soccer player currently playing as a midfielder for Siwelele.

== Career ==
=== Club career ===
On 30 January 2024, Boya joined Danish 1st Division side Næstved Boldklub.

On 1 August 2024, Ayer joined SuperSport United F.C. on a free transfer.

== Career statistics ==
As of 3 July 2020.

Appearances and goals by club, season and competition
Club	Season	League			Cup		Other		Total	
Club	Season	Division	Apps	Goals	Apps	Goals	Apps	Goals	Apps	Goals
Varbergs BoIS	2018	Superettan	8	0	1 (Note: Appearance(s) in Svenska Cupen)	0	1 (Note: Appearance(s) in Superettan playoffs)	0	10	0
Varbergs BoIS	2019	Superettan	29	2	2	0	0	0	31	2
Varbergs BoIS	2020	Allsvenskan	5	0	3	0	0	0	8	0
Career total			42	2	6	0	1	0	49	2
