= Filip Loftesnes-Bjune =

Norwegian footballer (born 2005)

Personal information
- Date of birth: 5 April 2005 (age 21)
- Place of birth: Tønsberg, Norway
- Position: Defender

Team information
- Current team: Sandefjord
- Number: 26

Youth career
- –2019: Flint
- 2018: → Sandefjord (youth loan)
- 2020–2021: Sandefjord

Senior career*
Years	Team	Apps	(Gls)
2021–	Sandefjord 2	5	(1)
2021–	Sandefjord	38	(0)

International career^{‡}
2022	Norway U17	5	(0)
2023	Norway U18	12	(0)
2024	Norway U19	6	(0)
- * Club domestic league appearances and goals as of 17 July 2026 ‡ National team caps and goals as of 2 December 2024

Filip Loftesnes-Bjune (born 5 April 2005) is a Norwegian footballer who plays as a defender for Sandefjord.

== Career statistics ==
=== Club ===
As of 15 February 2022.

Club	Season	League			Cup		Continental		Other		Total	
Club	Season	Division	Apps	Goals	Apps	Goals	Apps	Goals	Apps	Goals	Apps	Goals
Sandefjord 2	2021	4. divisjon	5	1	–		–		2 (Note: Appearances in the 4. divisjon promotion playoffs)	0	7	1
Sandefjord	2021	Eliteserien	1	0	0	0	–		0	0	1	0
Career total			6	1	0	0	0	0	2	0	8	1

== Honours ==
Individual

- Eliteserien Young Player of the Month: October/November 2024
