= Halsen IF =

Norwegian sports club

Halsen Idrettsforening
- Founded: 22 October 1933 (91 years ago)
- Based in: Larvik, Norway
- Stadium: Bergeskogen Idrettspark (association football); Bergslihallen (handball)
- Colours: Red; Green
- Website: http://www.halsenfotball.no/

Halsen Idrettsforening is a sports club located in Østre Halsen, Larvik, Norway. The club was founded as Halsen Ballklubb on 22 October 1933, and today it has sections for association football and handball. The men's football team currently plays in 3. divisjon, the fourth tier of the Norwegian football league system.

The club was initially founded in 1919, as a football club, but was dissolved in 1926. Halsen Ballklubb was re-founded on 22 October 1933. In 1948, the club changed its name to the current Halsen Idrettsforening.

== Football ==
Halsen IF Fotball
- Ground: Bergeskogen Idrettspark, Larvik
- Head coach: Petter Olsen
- League: 4. divisjon
- 2023: 3. divisjon, group 4, 12th of 14 (relegated)
- Website: http://www.halsenfotball.no/
Home colours	Away colours

Halsen IF was founded as Halsen Ballklubb on 22 October 1933. The men's football team currently plays in 4. divisjon, the fifth tier of the Norwegian football league system. They have played in the fifth tier since they relegated from the 3. divisjon in 2023.

=== Current squad ===
As of 24 January 2020

Note: Flags indicate national team as defined under FIFA eligibility rules; some limited exceptions apply. Players may hold more than one non-FIFA nationality.

No.	Pos.	Nation	Player
2	MF	(Norway) NOR	Thomas Gjendem Nerland
3	MF	(Norway) NOR	Morgan Halvorsen
4	MF	(Norway) NOR	Erlend Foldvik Kemkers
5	MF	(Norway) NOR	Peder Nalum Olsen
6	MF	(Norway) NOR	Jørgen Sønstevold
7	MF	(Norway) NOR	Christer Johansen Smith
8	DF	(Norway) NOR	Henrik Bach Røsholt
9	MF	(Norway) NOR	Simen Bjørneboe
10	FW	(Norway) NOR	Isak Solvik Nilsen
11	MF	(Norway) NOR	Tage Henriksen
12	GK	(Norway) NOR	Stian Ludvigsen
13	MF	(Norway) NOR	Alexander Rønning-Olsen

No.	Pos.	Nation	Player
14	MF	(Norway) NOR	Délégue Lukungu
15	DF	(Norway) NOR	Phuc Andreas Hoang
16	MF	(Norway) NOR	Eren Egin
17	FW	(Poland) POL	Adam Bluma
18	MF	(Norway) NOR	Carl Dokken Solli
19	MF	(Norway) NOR	Jens-Emil Kjær
20	FW	(Norway) NOR	Christian Holst
21	DF	(Norway) NOR	Marius Jacobsen
22	DF	(Norway) NOR	Simen Anthonsen
—	FW	(Norway) NOR	Brik Boufous

=== Recent seasons ===
Season		Pos.	Pl.	W	D	L	GS	GA	Pts	Cup	Notes	Ref.
2015	4. divisjon	↑ 1	20	16	1	3	93	20	49	First qualifying round		
2016	3. divisjon	6	26	16	1	9	71	46	49	First round		
2017	3. divisjon	8	26	11	2	13	61	69	35	First round		
2018	3. divisjon	6	26	12	4	10	55	42	40	First round		
2019	3. divisjon	11	26	9	2	15	44	72	29	Second qualifying round		
