= Alexander Ruud Tveter =

Norwegian footballer (born 1991)

Personal information
- Full name: Alexander Ruud Tveter
- Date of birth: 7 March 1991 (age 35)
- Place of birth: Lørenskog, Norway
- Height: 1.88 m (6 ft 2 in)
- Position: Forward

Youth career
- –2006: Langhus

Senior career*
Years	Team	Apps	(Gls)
2007–2010	Follo	29	(8)
2011–2013	Fredrikstad	44	(4)
2013–2015	Follo	85	(35)
2016–2017	Halmstad	53	(14)
2018–2020	Sarpsborg 08	16	(1)
2018	→ Strømmen (loan)	14	(2)
2021–2024	Sandefjord	117	(26)

International career
2011	Norway U21	2	(0)
- * Club domestic league appearances and goals as of 4 December 2024

Alexander Ruud Tveter (born 7 March 1991) is a Norwegian footballer who plays as a forward .

He has previously played for Halmstads BK in Allsvenskan, Fredrikstad and Sarpsborg 08 in Tippeligaen and Follo.

== Career ==
Ruud Tveter hails from Langhus and played for Langhus IL during his youth, where he was teammate with Etzaz Hussain. Ruud Tveter joined Follo in 2007 and was in December 2008 on a one-week trial with the German club VfB Stuttgart together with his teammate Edvard Skagestad. The 2010 season was a good season for Ruud Tveter; he played 29 matches and scored nine goals for Follo in the First Division and was a part of the Follo-team that played in the 2010 Norwegian Football Cup Final. Ruud Tveter joined Fredrikstad ahead of the 2011 season and signed a three-year contract with the club. Ruud Tveter started his first match in Tippeligaen and scored his first goal when Fredrikstad lost 2–1 against Stabæk on 25 April 2011.

After Fredrikstad loaned Henri Anier from Viking on the last day of the Norwegian winter transfer window, the club decided to let Ruud Tveter return his old club Follo, as his development had not been as the club expected, after a good first half season.

Ruud Tveter has represented Norway at youth level, and played two matches for the under-21 team in 2011.

== Career statistics ==
=== Club ===
As of match played 1 December 2024

Appearances and goals by club, season and competition
Club	Season	League			National Cup		Continental		Total	
Club	Season	Division	Apps	Goals	Apps	Goals	Apps	Goals	Apps	Goals
Follo	2010	Adeccoligaen	28	9	5	2	—		33	11
Follo	Total		28	9	5	2	—		33	11
Fredrikstad	2011	Tippeligaen	24	3	5	1	—		29	4
Fredrikstad	2012	Tippeligaen	20	1	2	0	—		22	1
Fredrikstad	Total		44	4	7	1	—		51	5
Follo	2013	Adeccoligaen	30	10	3	0	—		33	10
Follo	2014	Oddsen-ligaen	25	13	3	0	—		28	13
Follo	2015	OBOS-ligaen	30	12	2	2	—		32	14
Follo	Total		85	35	8	2	—		93	37
Halmstad	2016	Superettan	29	13	4	2	—		33	15
Halmstad	2017	Superettan	24	1	0	0	—		24	1
Halmstad	Total		53	14	4	2	—		57	16
Strømmen (loan)	2018	OBOS-ligaen	14	2	0	0	—		14	2
Strømmen (loan)	Total		14	2	0	0	—		14	2
Sarpsborg 08	2018	Eliteserien	0	0	3	3	—		3	3
Sarpsborg 08	2019	Eliteserien	4	1	1	1	—		5	2
Sarpsborg 08	2020	Eliteserien	12	0	0	0	—		12	0
Sarpsborg 08	Total		16	1	4	4	—		20	5
Sandefjord	2021	Eliteserien	30	6	2	0	—		32	6
Sandefjord	2022	Eliteserien	29	8	2	0	—		31	8
Sandefjord	2023	Eliteserien	30	8	3	1	—		33	9
Sandefjord	2024	Eliteserien	28	4	1	0	—		29	4
Sandefjord	Total		117	26	8	1	—		125	27
Career total			357	91	36	12	—		393	103
