= Youssef Chaib =

Norwegian footballer (born 1996)

Personal information
- Date of birth: 12 August 1996 (age 30)
- Place of birth: Norway
- Position: Winger

Team information
- Current team: Kvik Halden
- Number: 13

Youth career
- –2011: Trosvik
- 2012–2014: Fredrikstad

Senior career*
Years	Team	Apps	(Gls)
2015	Trosvik	24	(16)
2016–2017	Moss	34	(17)
2018	Fredrikstad	25	(1)
2019	Kvik Halden	25	(13)
2020–2021	Strømmen	37	(7)
2022–2023	Sandefjord	31	(2)
2025	Eik Tønsberg	6	(0)
2026–	Kvik Halden	11	(4)
- * Club domestic league appearances and goals as of 15 November 2026

Youssef Chaib (born 12 August 1996) is a Norwegian professional footballer who plays for Kvik Halden in the Norwegian Second Division.

== Career ==
Chaib played youth football in Trosvik until the age of 16, and after three seasons in Fredrikstad's youth team, he started his senior career in Trosvik. Via a two-year stint in Moss, he also got the chance to play for Fredrikstad's first team. After scoring less goals in Fredrikstad, he again scored double digits after joining Kvik Halden.

In January 2022, Chaib signed a two-year contract with Eliteserien side Sandefjord.

After the 2023 season, Sandefjord decided not to extend Chaib's contract. In the 2024 pre-season he was on trial with IK Start.
