= Húnaþing vestra =

- Municipality
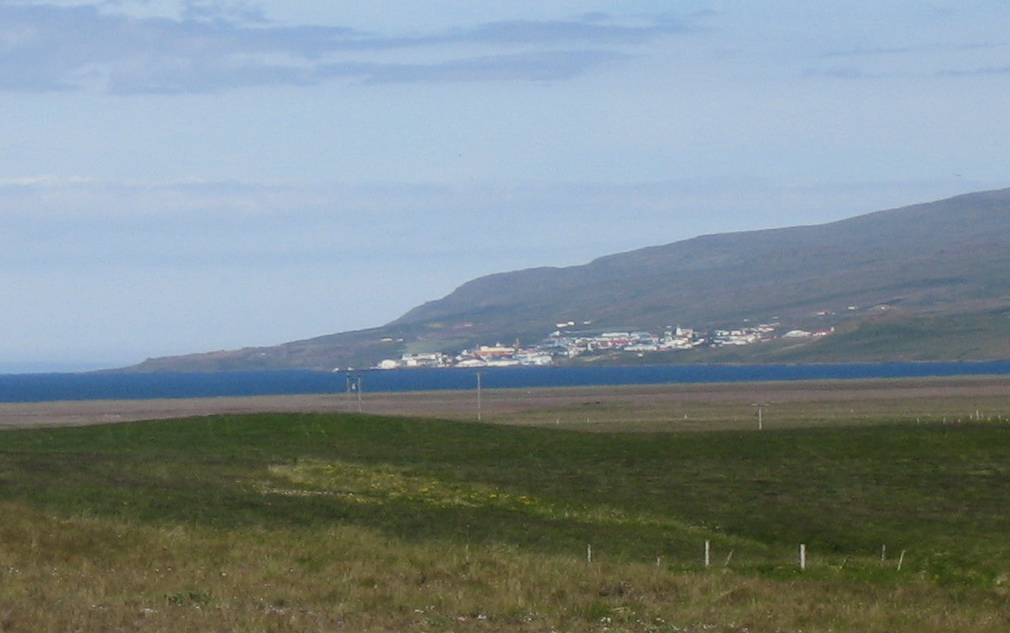
- Skyline of Húnaþing vestra

- Location of Húnaþing vestra

- Location within Iceland
- Coordinates: 65.397°N 20.942°W
- Country: Iceland
- Region: Northwestern Region
- Constituency: Northwest Constituency

Government
  - Manager: Unnur Valborg Hilmarsdóttir

Area
  - Total: 3,019 km^{2} (1,166 sq mi)

Population
  - Total: 1,173
  - Density: 0.39/km^{2} (1.0/sq mi)
- Postal code(s): 500, 530, 531
- Municipal number: 5508
- Website: hunathing.is

Húnaþing vestra (Icelandic pronunciation: [ˈhuːnaˌθiŋk ˈvɛstra]) is a municipality located in northern Iceland by Húnaflói gulf. It was founded on 7 June 1998 by the merging of all 7 of the old rural municipalities of Vestur-Húnavatnssýsla. They were: Staðarhreppur, Fremri-Torfustaðahreppur, Ytri-Torfustaðahreppur, Kirkjuhvammshreppur, Hvammstangahreppur, Þverárhreppur and Þorkelshólshreppur. On 1 January 2012, the municipality was merged with the county of Bæjarhreppur but kept the name Húnaþing vestra.

Húnaþing vestra consists of the three fjords Hrútafjörður og Miðfjörður, and Húnafjörður. Between are the peninsulas of Heggstaðanes and Vatnsnes. Its major settlement is Hvammstangi, but it also has the villages of Laugabakki, Reykir and Borðeyri.
