= List of painters from Iceland =

This is a list of notable painters from, or associated with, Iceland.

== A ==
- Ásgrímur Jónsson (1876–1958)

== B ==
- Bjarni Jónsson (1934–2008)

== E ==
- Erró (born 1932)
- Edda Heiðrún Backman (1957–2016)
- Einar Hákonarson (born 1945)
- Elínborg Halldórsdóttir (born 1962)

== G ==
- Gabríela Friðriksdóttir (born 1971)
- Georg Guðni Hauksson (1961–2011)
- Gunnlaugur Scheving (1904–1972)

== H ==
- Haukur Halldórsson (born 1937)
- Hringur Jóhannesson (1932–1996)

== J ==
- Jóhannes Geir Jónsson (1927–2003)
- Jóhannes Sveinsson Kjarval (1885–1972)
- Jón Stefánsson (1881–1962)
- Júlíana Sveinsdóttir (1889–1966)

== K ==
- Karl Kvaran (1924–1989)
- Karólína Lárusdóttir (1944–2019)
- Kristín Jónsdóttir (1888–1959)
- Kristján Guðmundsson (born 1941)

== L ==
- Louisa Matthíasdóttir (1917–2000)

== M ==
- Muggur (1891–1924)

== N ==
- Nína Tryggvadóttir (1913–1968)

== S ==
- Svavar Guðnason (1909–1988)
- Samúel Jónsson (1884–1969)
- Sölvi Helgason (1820–1895)

== V ==
- Vilhjálmur Einarsson (1934–2019)

== Þ ==
- Þórarinn B. Þorláksson (1867–1924)
- Þorvaldur Skúlason (1906–1984)
