= Law of Iceland =

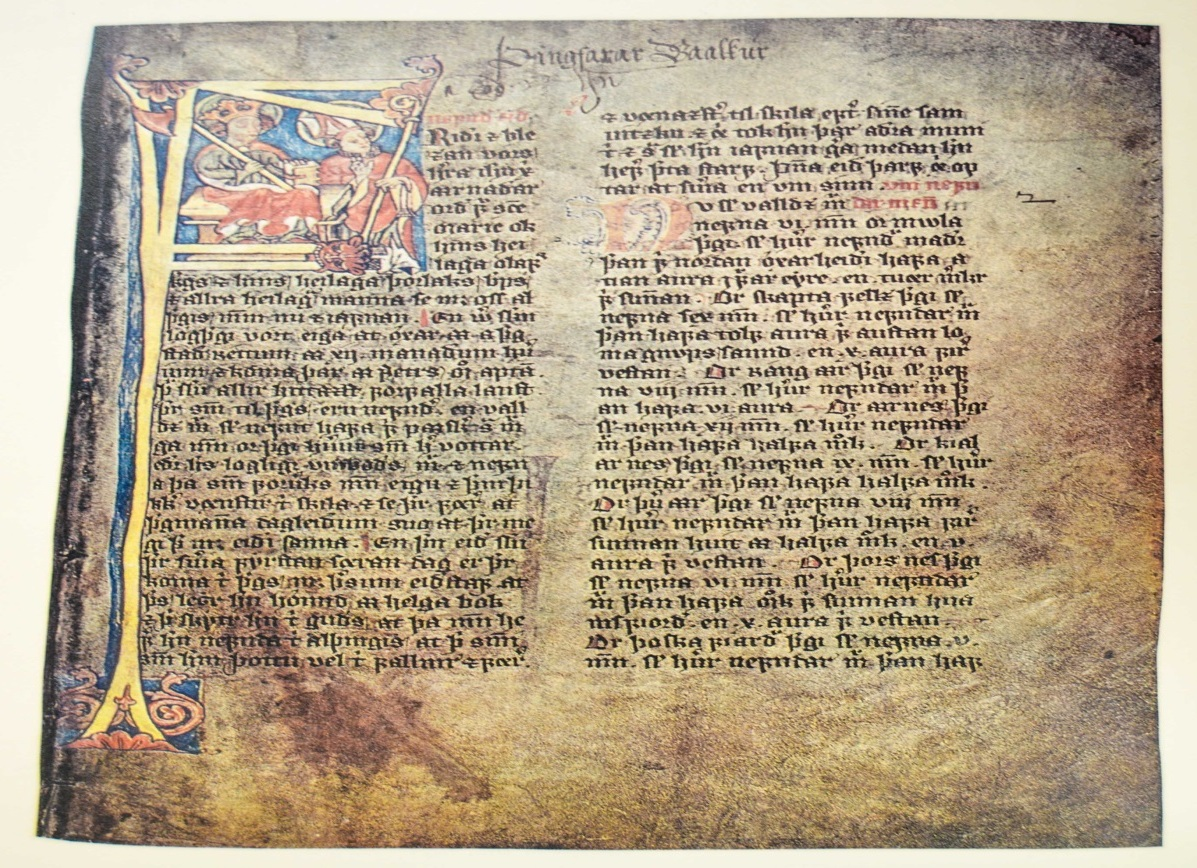
Jónsbók, MS AM 351 Fol., Skálholtsbók eldri.

Law of Iceland during the Commonwealth (930–1262) was decided by the Alþingi (Althing). It has changed over the years, but the legislative body is still called the Althing.

== History ==
Following the settlement of Iceland around the 870s, Iceland lacked a unitary legal system. Already around the year 930, the chiefs of the different regions of Iceland united into a single polity. A people's assembly, the Alþingi, was instituted, meeting annually to exercise both judicial and legislative activities. This included having one lawspeaker (lǫgsǫgumaðr) on a rotating basis. His role was to know the law by heart and inform on points of law in legal cases. The first lawspeaker is said to have been Úlfljótr, who gave Iceland its first set of laws. These are thought to have corresponded closely to the Gulating laws from Norway.

Iceland's early laws were changed by agreement at the Alþingi, with prominent changes including the polity's conversion to Christianity in 1000 and the criminalisation of aspects of pagan practice around 1016.

Codification was undertaken in 1117–18, led by Hafliði Másson. The resulting text, known as Hafliðaskrá, does not survive, but seems to have been one of the foundations of the voluminous records of the law of the Icelandic Commonwealth known as Grágás. Grágás became Iceland's law up to 1262–64, when Iceland came under Norwegian rule.

Following the Gamli sáttmáli (Old Covenant) of 1262, Magnus VI of Norway attempted to introduce the law code Járnsíða around 1271–73; this was itself superseded when existing laws were compiled in Jónsbók by Jón Einarsson (in 1281). Jónsbók was supplemented by or competed with some other sources of law, including ecclesiastical law, laws of local þing, and other tracts such as Búalǫg ('farmers' laws'), a body of laws concerning farming and trade within Iceland from around 1400. Although Icelandic law has changed much over time, and Iceland came under Danish rule until 1944, Jónsbók remained the basis for Icelandic law into the twentieth century.

The Althing was suspended in 1799, but re-established in 1845 as an advisory body of the Danish king and from 1874 as a legislative body.

=== Uses of old laws ===
Old laws are still quoted: the 13th century law of Grágás was used in a case in 2017 regarding an injury caused in a MMA tournament, citing the rules of "friendly fight".

== Current system ==
The legislative body of the modern Republic of Iceland (since 1944) is again known as Althing, although it is a representative parliamentary body and not a popular assembly like the original thing.

Icelandic law consists primarily of statutes adopted by the Althing, with some orders issued by the Cabinet (executive branch of the state), normally as regulations. The Ministry of Justice makes public the rules of law which apply in Iceland.

Under Article 2 of the constitution, the Althing and the President of Iceland jointly exercise legislative power, with Articles 13 and 19 requiring the President to entrust his authority to the Ministers, with the President validating each law by signing with a Minister to give formal consent. Between 1944 and 2023 the president has refused consent on two occasions.

Article 78 allows certain public tasks and rights to be delegated to local municipalities, governed by the Local Authorities Act No. 138/2011. There are 74 local municipalities, each governed by an elected body of locally elected representatives.

== See also ==
- Energy law
- Icelandic nationality law
