= Borðeyri =

Hamlet in Westfjords, Iceland

- Hamlet
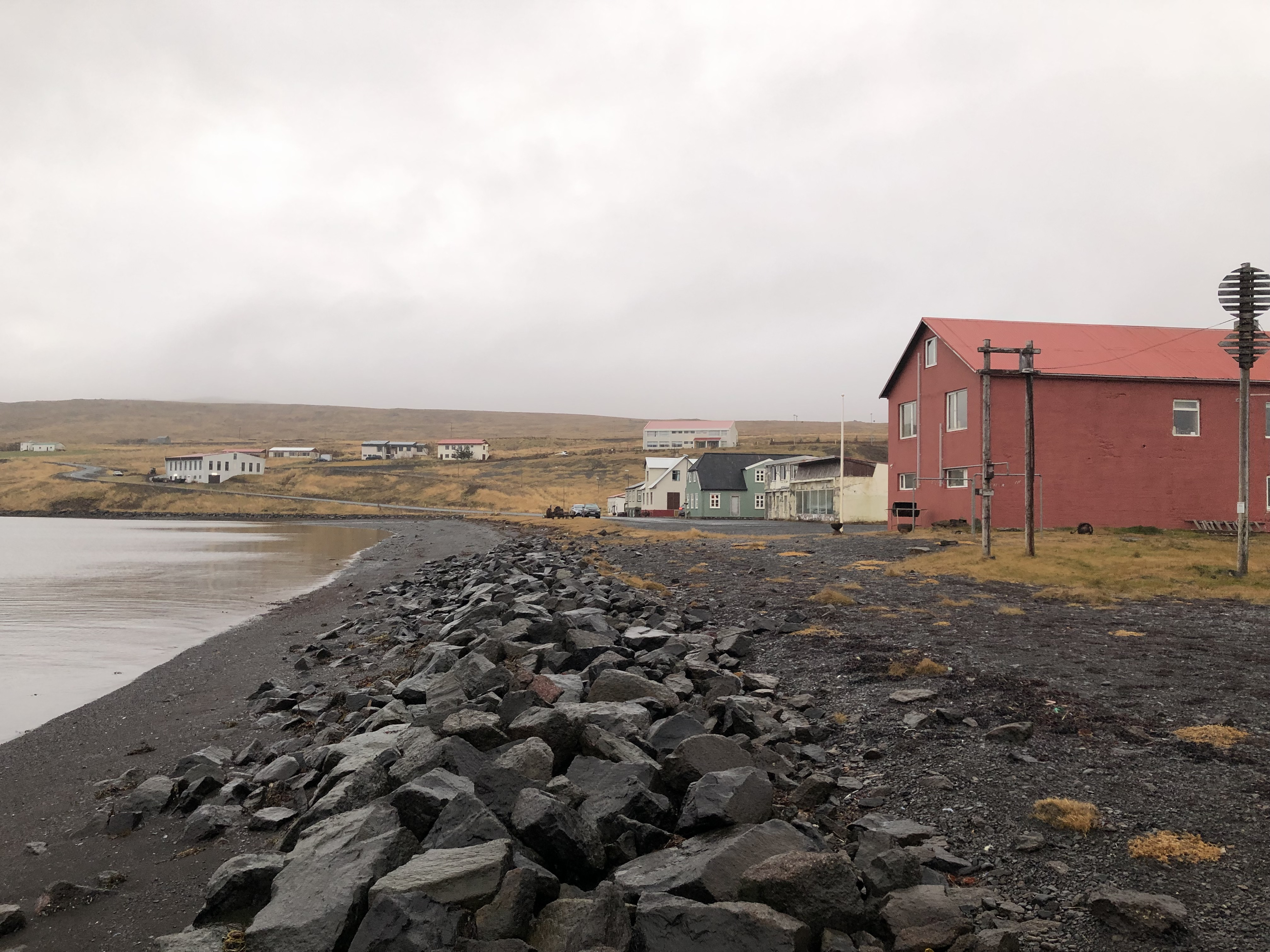
- Borðeyri in 2018

- Location of Borðeyri in Iceland
- Coordinates: 65°12′N 21°6′W
- Country: Iceland
- Constituency: Northwest Constituency
- Region: Northwestern Region
- Municipality: Húnaþing vestra

Population (15 July 2018)
  - Total: 16
- Time zone: UTC+0 (GMT)

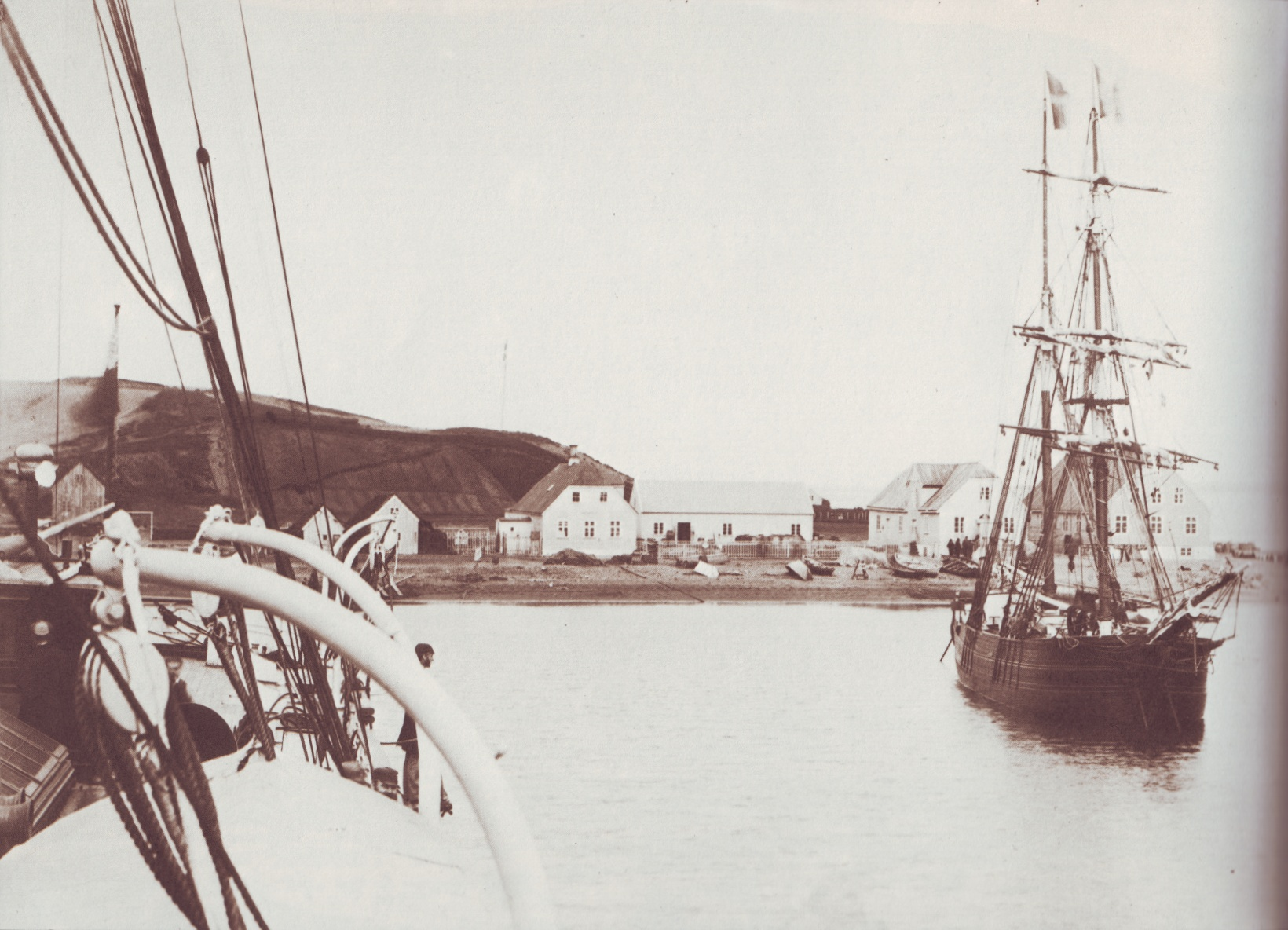
The village of Borðeyri in 1883

Borðeyri (Icelandic pronunciation: [ˈpɔrðˌeiːrɪ]) is a hamlet in Húnaþing vestra municipality of the Northwestern Region in northwest Iceland. It is a minor commercial centre for nearby farms. The population on 15 July 2018 was 16. Borðeyri was previously part of the municipality Bæjarhreppur, which was one of the smallest in Iceland – having a population of about 100 in 2010 – and covered the west part of Hrútafjörður fjord. Bæjarhreppur merged into Húnaþing vestra on 1 January 2012. In Borðeyri, there is a pre-school and an elementary school, a garage, and a guesthouse. Prime Minister Sigurdur Eggerz and the painters Þorvaldur Skúlason and Karl Kvaran were born in Borðeyri.

Borðeyri became a licensed trading place in 1846 and remained so until the 21st century. In the second half of the 19th century, Borðeyri became a very important seaport of the time. The export of sheep to Britain was the main source of Borðeyri's economy, but many of those who moved west across the ocean began heading west to America. Today there is a mechanic's workshop, tourist services and a summer campground in Tangahús, and the owners of the old houses in Borðeyri are constantly improving their homes, but the townscape is very dilapidated due to the age of the village. One of the oldest houses in the area is the Riis house, built in 1862. It has recently been renovated on the outside and is very impressive, making the village a very unusual place. At a meeting of the Borðeyri council, which took place on April 10, 2019, the proposal to consider Borðeyri as a Protected Area was confirmed.
