= Hilmir Rafn Mikaelsson =

Icelandic footballer (born 2004)

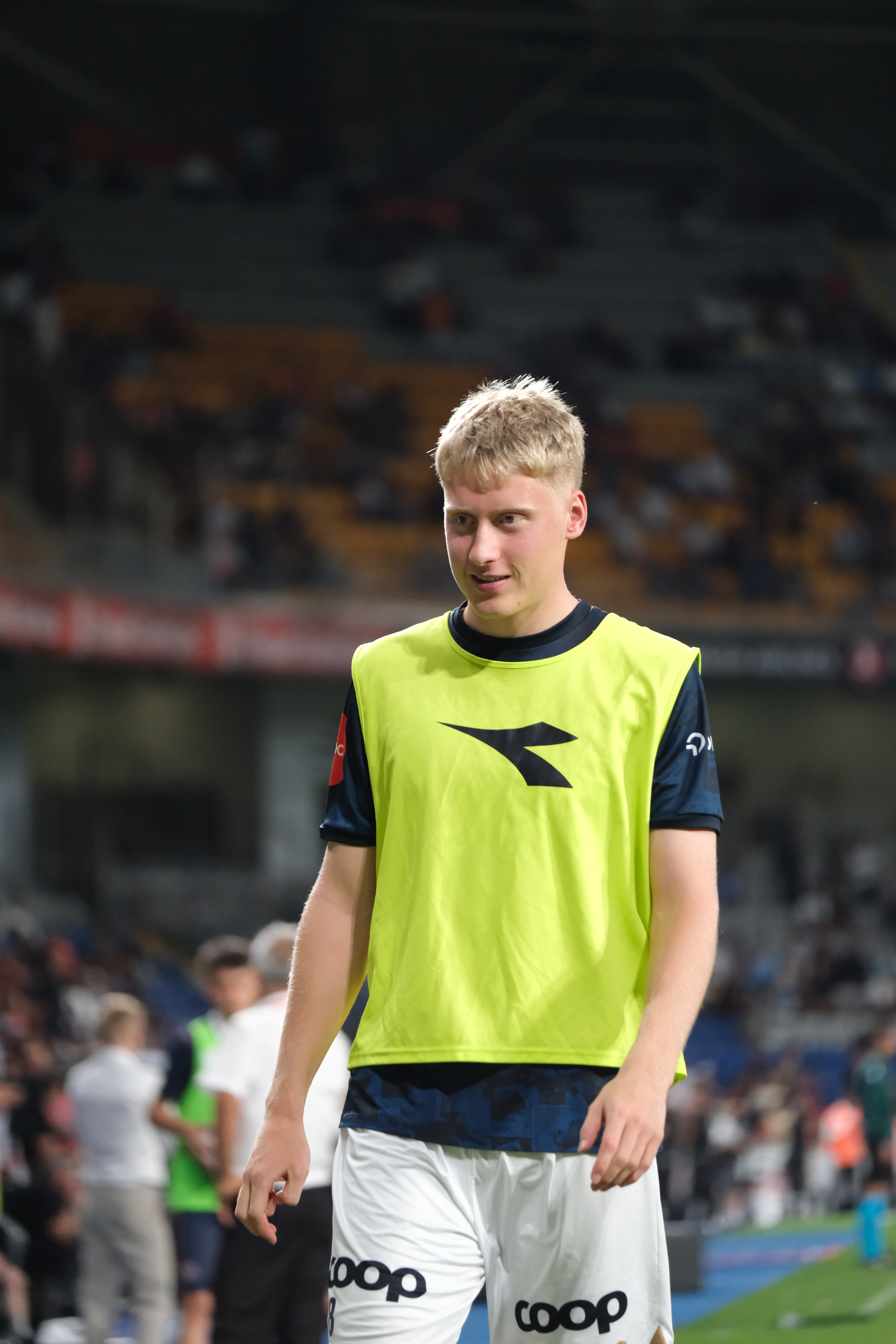
- Hilmir Rafn with Viking in 2025

Personal information
- Full name: Hilmir Rafn Mikaelsson
- Date of birth: 2 February 2004 (age 22)
- Place of birth: Hvammstangi, Iceland
- Height: 1.95 m (6 ft 5 in)
- Position: Forward

Team information
- Current team: Sigma Olomouc

Youth career
- –2018: Kormákur
- 2018–2020: Fjölnir
- 2021–2022: → Venezia (loan)

Senior career*
Years	Team	Apps	(Gls)
2020–2022	Fjölnir	11	(2)
2022–2025	Venezia	1	(0)
2023	→ Tromsø (loan)	3	(0)
2024	→ Kristiansund (loan)	27	(3)
2025–2026	Viking	15	(2)
2026–	Sigma Olomouc	0	(0)

International career^{‡}
2021–2023	Iceland U19	17	(6)
2022–	Iceland U21	11	(3)
- * Club domestic league appearances and goals as of 13:58, 19 June 2026 (UTC) ‡ National team caps and goals as of 08:43, 27 March 2025 (UTC)

Hilmir Rafn Mikaelsson (born 2 February 2004) is an Icelandic professional footballer who plays as a forward for Czech First League club Sigma Olomouc.

== Club career ==
=== Early career ===
Born in Iceland and raised in the village of Hvammstangi, Hilmir Rafn started his playing career at local grassroots club Kormákur, before joining Fjölnir at the age of 14, after a successful trial during a training camp in Spain with the under-14 team.

=== Venezia ===
In August 2021, Hilmir Rafn joined Serie A side Venezia, initially on a season-long loan with an option to buy. After featuring for the club's under-19 side throughout the 2021-22 season, the forward made his Serie A debut on 22 May 2022, coming on as a substitute for Dennis Johnsen at the 73rd minute of a 0–0 draw against Cagliari. At the end of the league campaign, Venezia made their deal for Hilmir Rafn permanent.

On 7 August 2022, he was one of the fourteen youth players that received a call-up by head coach Ivan Javorčić for a Coppa Italia preliminary match against Ascoli, after thirteen members of Venezia's first-team tested positive for COVID-19. Having taken the place of Mirza Hasanbegovic at the 57th minute of the game, he went on to score a brace between the 88th and 89th minutes, providing his team with the equalizer and taking the match to the extra-time, although Ascoli eventually gained a 2–3 win. On 6 October 2022, Hilmir Rafn extended his contract with the club until June 2027.

==== Loan to Tromsø ====
On 11 January 2023, Hilmir Rafn officially joined Norwegian side Tromsø IL on loan until the end of the year.

He made his debut for the club on 12 March, starting the NM Cupen fourth round match against Start, which ended in a 5–6 win after penalties for his side. One week later, on 19 March, he scored his first goal in the cup's quarter-final match against Lillestrøm, which ended in a 2–3 loss after extra time.

==== Loan to Kristiansund ====
On 12 February 2024, Hilmir Rafn joined fellow Eliteserien club Kristiansund on loan for the 2024 season.

=== Viking ===
On 10 January 2025, Hilmir Rafn signed a four-year contract with Eliteserien club Viking. He made 12 appearances and scored two goals as Viking won the 2025 Eliteserien.

=== Sigma Olomouc ===
On 18 June 2025, Hilmir Rafn signed a multi-year contract with Czech First League club Sigma Olomouc.

== International career ==
Hilmir Rafn has represented Iceland at various youth levels, having played for the under-19 and under-21 national teams.

In June 2023, he was included in the Icelandic squad that took part in the 2023 UEFA European Under-19 Championship.

== Career statistics ==
As of match played 11 April 2026

Appearances and goals by club, season and competition
Club	Season	League			National cup (Note: Includes Icelandic Cup, Coppa Italia, Norwegian Cup)		Europe		Total	
Club	Season	Division	Apps	Goals	Apps	Goals	Apps	Goals	Apps	Goals
Fjölnir	2020	Besta deild karla	0	0	0	0	0	0	0	0
Fjölnir	2021	1. deild karla	11	2	1	0	0	0	12	2
Fjölnir	Total		11	2	1	0	0	0	12	2
Venezia (loan)	2021–22	Serie A	1	0	0	0	0	0	1	0
Venezia	2022–23	Serie B	0	0	1	2	0	0	1	2
Venezia	2023–24	Serie B	0	0	0	0	0	0	0	0
Venezia	Total		1	0	1	2	0	0	2	2
Tromsø (loan)	2023	Eliteserien	3	0	2	1	0	0	5	1
Kristiansund (loan)	2024	Eliteserien	27	3	3	0	0	0	30	3
Viking	2025	Eliteserien	12	2	5	4	1 (Note: Appearance in UEFA Conference League)	2	18	8
Viking	2026	Eliteserien	3	0	2	1	0	0	5	1
Viking	Total		15	2	7	5	1	2	23	9
Career total			57	7	14	8	1	2	72	17

== Honours ==
Viking

- Eliteserien: 2025
