= Hvammstangi =

- Town
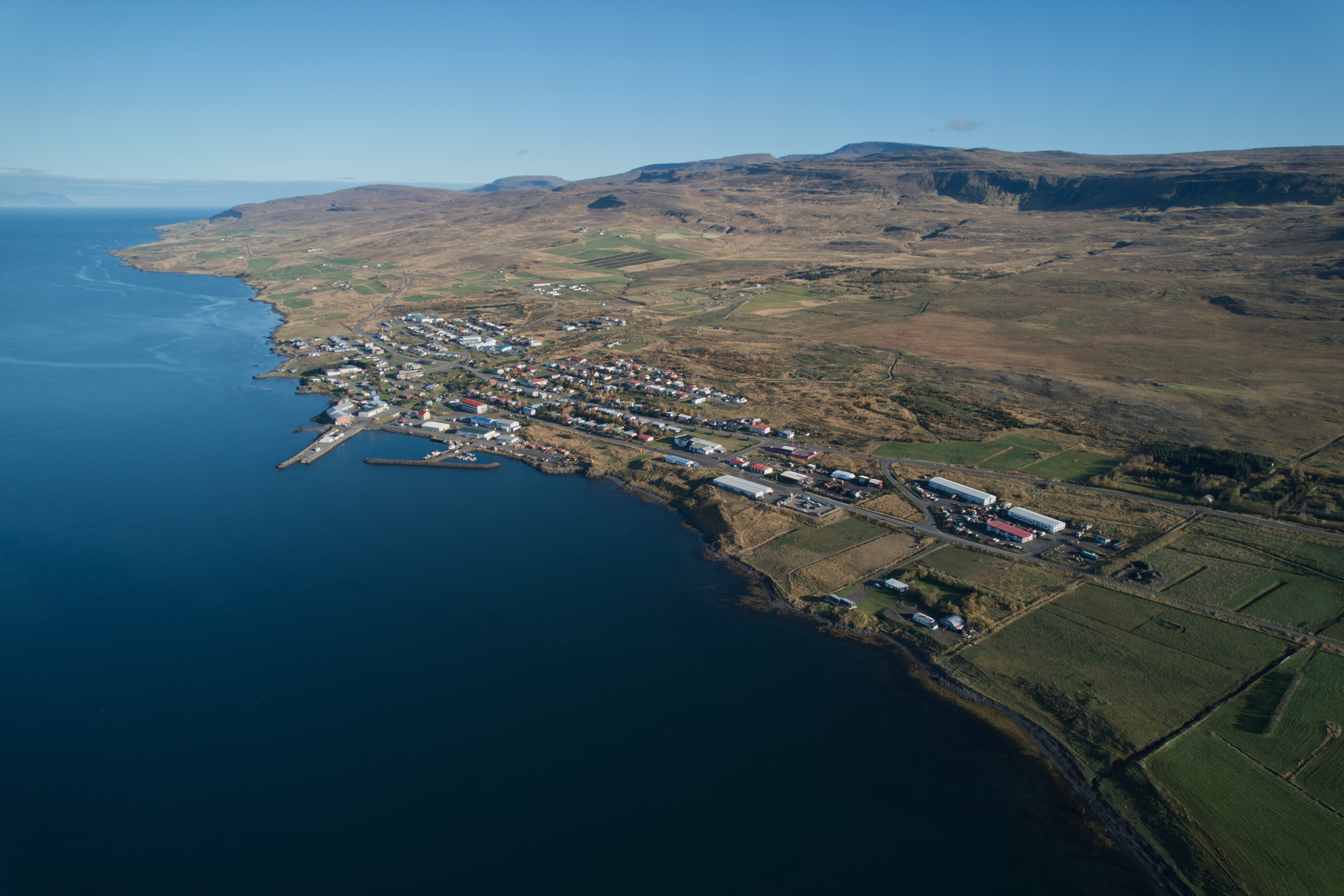
- Hvammstangi

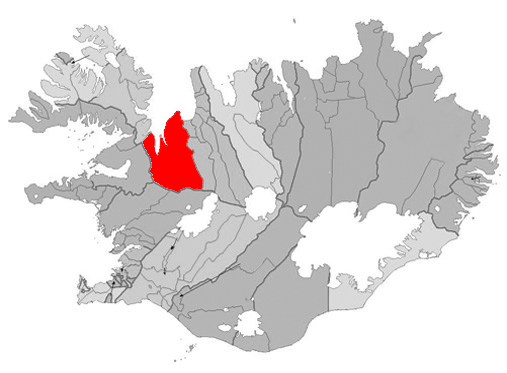
- Location of the Municipality of Húnaþing vestra

- Location within Iceland
- Coordinates: 65°24′N 20°57′W
- Country: Iceland
- Constituency: Northwest Constituency
- Region: Northwestern Region
- Municipality: Húnaþing vestra

Population (January 2011)
  - Total: 582
- Póstnúmer: 531
- Website: Official website

Hvammstangi (Icelandic pronunciation: [ˈkʰvamsˌtʰauɲcɪ]) is an Icelandic village in the north-west part of the country, on Vatnsnes peninsula, situated on the Miðfjörður.

It is the most densely populated area in the West Húnaþing County, with a population of about 580 people as of January 2011.

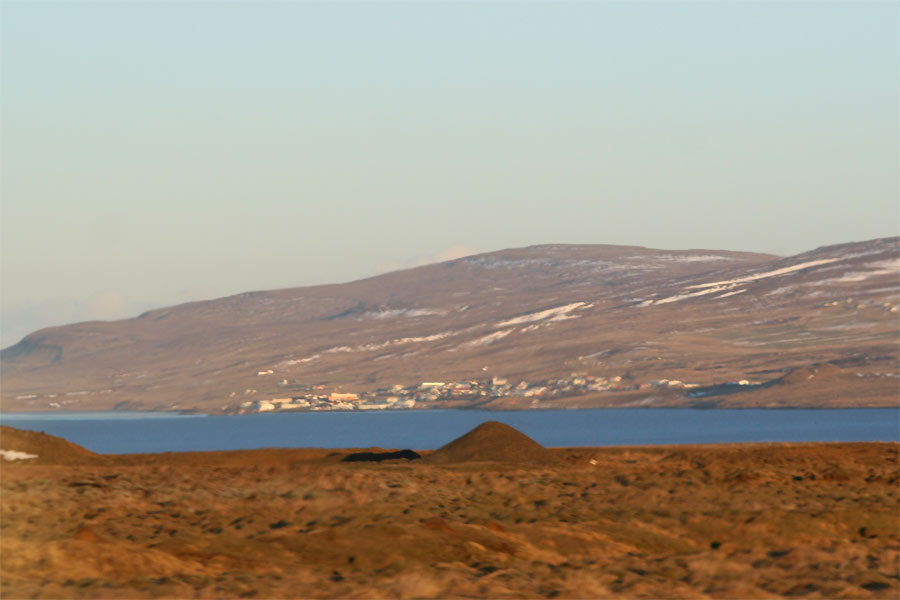
North across Miðfjörður to Hvammstangi, November 2007

== Overview ==
Hvammstangi is an important service center for the surrounding area. It is a regional provider of education, and it has been an important trading center since 1846. The town has a growing tourism and administration industry. The fishing industry (providing mainly shrimp) is also very important to the town's economy. The town also owns the largest textile factory in Iceland. The town is also home to the Icelandic Seal Center.

== Athletics ==
Hvammstangi is the home of 2. division football club Kormákur/Hvöt.
