= Mælifell =

Volcano in Iceland

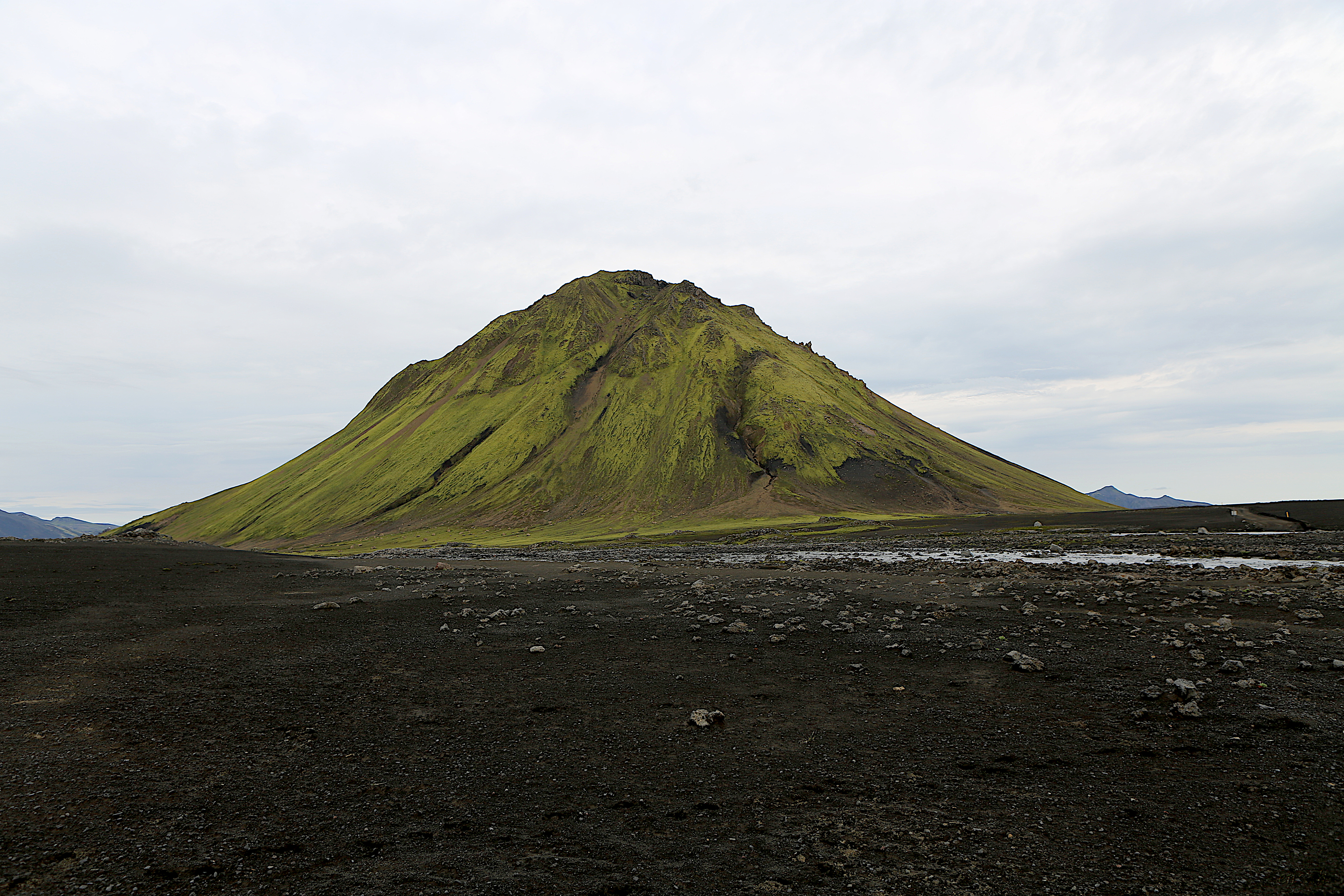

Highest point
- Elevation: 791 m (2,595 ft)
- Coordinates: 63°47′56″N 18°56′17″W

Geography
- Location within Iceland

Geology
- Mountain type: Stratovolcano

Mælifell (Icelandic pronunciation: [ˈmaiːlɪˌfɛtl̥]) is a volcano located in Southern Iceland.

Mælifell stands 791 meters above sea level, and it is a composite cone volcano formed by volcanic eruptions underneath the Myrdalsjökull glacier. Mælifell surfaced approximately 10,000 years ago as glaciers receded after the Last glacial period. Its distinctive volcanic landscape reflects the interaction between volcanic activity and glacial environments. The mountain is particularly notable for its isolated green volcanic cone, which contrasts with the surrounding dark volcanic terrain. This volcanic cone is covered by cushion moss, which colonises lava surfaces and becomes particularly vibrant when wet. Mosses are an important component of Icelandic vegetation and are widespread in volcanic landscapes.

Apart from walking, Mount Mælifell is reachable only by a 4WD vehicle. It is on the southern Fjallabak road next to the glacier Mýrdalsjökull. The road is usually wet and sometimes completely flooded, making the volcano only accessible from July to the beginning of October.
