= 2024 Kristiansund BK season =

Kristiansund
2024 season
- Chairman: Vidar Solli
- Head coach: Amund Skiri
- Stadium: Kristiansund Stadion
- Eliteserien: 11th
- Norwegian Cup: Third round
- Top goalscorer: League: Oskar Sivertsen (5); All: Pape Habib Guèye (6)
Home colours	Away colours	Third colours

The 2024 season is Kristiansund BK's 21st season in existence and the club's first season back in the top flight of Norwegian football. In addition to the domestic league, Kristiansund BK participated in this season's edition of the Norwegian Football Cup.

== Players ==
=== First team squad ===
As of 3 April 2024

Note: Flags indicate national team as defined under FIFA eligibility rules; some limited exceptions apply. Players may hold more than one non-FIFA nationality.

No.	Pos.	Nation	Player
1	GK	USA	Michael Lansing
3	DF	NOR	Christoffer Aasbak
4	DF	NOR	Marius Olsen
5	DF	NOR	Dan Peter Ulvestad (captain)
6	DF	NOR	Andreas Hopmark
7	FW	SEN	Pape Habib Guèye (on loan from Aberdeen)
8	MF	NOR	Ruben Alte
9	FW	ISL	Hilmir Rafn Mikaelsson (on loan from Venezia)
11	FW	NOR	Franklin Nyenetue
12	GK	NOR	Adrian Sæther
14	MF	NOR	Jesper Isaksen
15	FW	NOR	Mikkel Rakneberg
17	FW	ISL	Brynjólfur Willumsson

No.	Pos.	Nation	Player
18	DF	NOR	Sebastian Jarl
19	FW	NOR	Leander Alvheim
20	MF	NGR	Wilfred George Igor
22	DF	NOR	Håkon Sjåtil
23	MF	NOR	Heine Gikling Bruseth
24	FW	NOR	Awet Ermias Alemseged
26	DF	NOR	Max Normann Williamsen
29	FW	NOR	Marius Weidel
30	GK	SEN	Serigne Mbaye
33	FW	NOR	Haakon Haugen
34	MF	NOR	Andreas Bakeng-Rogne
35	DF	NOR	Isak Aalberg
37	FW	NOR	Oskar Sivertsen

== Transfers ==
=== Winter ===
In: Note: Flags indicate national team as defined under FIFA eligibility rules; some limited exceptions apply. Players may hold more than one non-FIFA nationality.

No.	Pos.	Nation	Player
1	GK	USA	Michael Lansing (from Kristiansund)
7	FW	SEN	Pape Habib Guèye (on loan from (Scotland) Aberdeen)
8	MF	NOR	Ruben Alte (from Ranheim)
9	FW	ISL	Hilmir Rafn Mikaelsson (on loan from (Italy) Venezia)
11	FW	NOR	Franklin Nyenetue (from Sandefjord)
22	DF	NOR	Håkon Sjåtil (from Åsane)
24	MF	NGR	Wilfred George Igor (from (Nigeria) Hype Buzz, previously on loan)
33	FW	NOR	Haakon Haugen (promoted from junior squad)
34	MF	NOR	Andreas Bakeng-Rogne (promoted from junior squad)

Out: Note: Flags indicate national team as defined under FIFA eligibility rules; some limited exceptions apply. Players may hold more than one non-FIFA nationality.

No.	Pos.	Nation	Player
1	GK	IRL	Sean McDermott (released)
2	DF	NOR	Snorre Strand Nilsen (to Hamkam)
7	FW	NOR	Torgil Øwre Gjertsen (released)
9	FW	NOR	Benjamin Stokke (to (Iceland) Breiðablik)
21	MF	NOR	Marius Sivertsen Broholm (loan return to Rosenborg)
36	DF	NOR	Bendik Brevik (to (Sweden) Piteå, previously on loan)

== Competitions ==
=== Overview ===
Competition	First match	Last match	Starting round	Final position	Record							
Competition	First match	Last match	Starting round	Final position	Pld	W	D	L	GF	GA	GD	Win %
Eliteserien	1 April 2024	1 December 2024	Matchday 1	11th	30	8	10	12	32	45	−13	26.67
Norwegian Cup	10 April 2024	1 May 2024	First round	Third round	3	2	0	1	4	6	−2	66.67
Total					33	10	10	13	36	51	−15	30.30

Last updated: 1 December 2024
Source: Soccerway

=== Eliteserien ===
==== League table ====
Pos	Team	Pld	W	D	L	GF	GA	GD	Pts
9	Sarpsborg	30	10	7	13	43	55	−12	37
10	Sandefjord	30	9	7	14	41	46	−5	34
11	Kristiansund	30	8	10	12	32	45	−13	34
12	HamKam	30	8	9	13	34	39	−5	33
13	Tromsø	30	9	6	15	34	44	−10	33

Source: Football Association of Norway (in Norwegian)
Rules for classification: 1) Points; 2) Goal difference; 3) Goals scored; 4) Head-to-head points; 5) Head-to-head goal difference; 6) Head-to-head goals scored.

==== Results summary ====
Overall								Home						Away					
Pld	W	D	L	GF	GA	GD	Pts	W	D	L	GF	GA	GD	W	D	L	GF	GA	GD
30	8	10	12	32	45	−13	34	5	6	4	19	23	−4	3	4	8	13	22	−9

Last updated: 1 December 2024.

==== Results by round ====
Round	1	2	3	4	5	6	7	8	9	10	11	12	13	14	15	16	17	18	19	20	21	22	23	24	25	26	27	28	29	30
Ground	A	H	A	H	A	H	H	A	H	A	H	A	H	A	H	A	H	A	H	A	H	A	H	A	H	A	A	H	A	H
Result	W	D	L	W	D	D	L	L	D	L	W	D	W	L	W	D	W	L	L	L	D	W	D	L	D	L	D	L	W	L
Position	5	3	10	6	7	8	8	11	9	11	9	9	7	10	7	7	6	7	9	10	11	8	8	9	8	10	11	12	10	11

A = Away; H = Home; W = Win; D = Draw; L = Loss

==== Matches ====
The league fixtures were announced on 20 December 2023.

1 April 2024 1	Lillestrøm	2–3	Kristiansund	Lillestrøm
17:00 CEST (UTC+2)	Garnås 59'; Olsen 82'	Report	Alte 13'; Guèye (yellow card) 38'; Hilmir Rafn (yellow card) 47'; Ulvestad 49'; Bruseth 66'	Stadium: Åråsen Stadion; Attendance: 9,457; Referee: Tore Hansen

7 April 2024 2	Kristiansund	1–1	KFUM Oslo	Kristiansund
14:30 CEST (UTC+2)	Sivertsen 45+1' (pen.); Jarl (yellow card) 47'	Report	Akinyemi (yellow card) 44'; Hoseth 45+3'; Tønnessen (yellow card) 55'; Dahl (yellow card) 78'	Stadium: Kristiansund Stadion; Attendance: 3,549; Referee: Marius Lien

14 April 2024 3	Molde	2–0	Kristiansund	Molde
17:00 CEST (UTC+2)	Hestad 27'; Eriksen 56'	Report	Williamsen (yellow card) 23'; Guèye (yellow card) 60'; Willumsson (yellow card) 90+3'	Stadium: Aker Stadion; Attendance: 8,810; Referee: Rohit Saggi

21 April 2024 4	Kristiansund	1–0	Tromsø	Kristiansund
17:00 CEST (UTC+2)	Olsen (yellow card) 20'; Guèye 44'; Willumsson (penalty missed) 58'; Isaksen (yellow card) 89'	Report	Jenssen (yellow card) 39'; Psyché (yellow card) 43'	Stadium: Kristiansund Stadion; Attendance: 3,339; Referee: Mathias Støfringshaug

28 April 2024 5	Strømsgodset	2–2	Kristiansund	Drammen
17:00 CEST (UTC+2)	Farji (yellow card) 45'; Valsvik 71'; Melkersen 78'	Report	Sivertsen 22' (pen.); Willumsson 40'; Jarl (yellow card) 53'; Olsen (yellow card) 59'; Guèye (yellow card) 70'	Stadium: Marienlyst Stadion; Attendance: 4,279; Referee: Ola Hobber Nilsen

5 May 2024 6	Kristiansund	1–1	HamKam	Kristiansund
17:00 CEST (UTC+2)	Mikaelsson 29'; Willumsson (yellow card) 81'	Report	Mares 22' (pen.); Mawa (yellow card) 84'; Simenstad (yellow card) 86'	Stadium: Kristiansund Stadion; Attendance: 3,280; Referee: Tore Hansen

12 May 2024 7	Kristiansund	2–4	Bodø/Glimt	Kristiansund
14:30 CEST (UTC+2)	Alte (yellow card) 10'; Guèye 44', 84'; Jarl (yellow card) 68'	Report	Grønbæk 37', 67'; Sørensen (yellow card) 40'; Hauge 89', (yellow card) 90+3'; Høgh 90+3'	Stadium: Kristiansund Stadion; Attendance: 4,018; Referee: Daniel Higraff

16 May 2024 8	Haugesund	1–0	Kristiansund	Haugesund
18:00 CEST (UTC+2)	Tounekti 47' (yellow card) 79'	Report	Bruseth (yellow card) 17'; Rakneberg (yellow card) 56'	Stadium: Haugesund Stadion; Attendance: 6,628; Referee: Kristoffer Hagenes

20 May 2024 9	Kristiansund	2–2	Brann	Kristiansund
17:00 CEST (UTC+2)	Sivertsen 5' (pen.); Alte (yellow card) 47'; Jarl 53'	Report	Finne 13'; Myhre 79'	Stadium: Kristiansund Stadion; Attendance: 3,581; Referee: Mohammad Usman Aslam

26 May 2024 10	Rosenborg	2–1	Kristiansund	Trondheim
17:00 CEST (UTC+2)	Reitan-Sunde (yellow card) 12'; Nelson 49'; Väänänen (yellow card) 84'; Broholm 86'	Report	Isaksen 35'; Ulvestad (yellow card) 75'	Stadium: Lerkendal Stadion; Attendance: 11,649; Referee: Svein Tore Sinnes

29 May 2024 18	Brann	2–1	Kristiansund	Bergen
19:00 CEST (UTC+2)	S. H. Nilsen 38'; Crone (yellow card) 72'; Myhre (yellow card) 79'; Warming (yellow card) 90+1'; Soltvedt 90+9' (pen.)	Report	Alte (yellow card) 51' (goal) 69'	Stadium: Brann Stadion; Attendance: 14,538; Referee: Ola Hobber Nilsen

2 June 2024 11	Kristiansund	3–1	Sarpsborg 08	Kristiansund
17:00 CEST (UTC+2)	Sivertsen (yellow card) 26'; Mikaelsson (yellow card) 65' (goal) 75' (pen.); Guèye 69'; Isaksen 82'	Report	Chrupałła (yellow card) 29'; Andersen (yellow card) 65'; Ørjasæter 86'	Stadium: Kristiansund Stadion; Attendance: 3,391; Referee: Sivert Øksnes Amland

28 June 2024 12	Odd	1–1	Kristiansund	Skien
19:00 CEST (UTC+2)	Ruud (penalty missed) 26'; Hussain (yellow card) 69'; Ingebrigtsen 69'	Report	Bruseth 34'; Aasbak (yellow card) 67'; Isaksen (yellow card) 89'	Stadium: Skagerak Arena; Attendance: 4,018

8 July 2024 13	Kristiansund	3–1	Fredrikstad	Molde
19:00 CEST (UTC+2)	Alte 14'; Rakneberg (yellow card) 32'; Sivertsen 45+4' (pen.); Traoré 59' (o.g.)	Report	Bjørlo 9' (pen.) (red card) 19'; Woledzi (yellow card) 58'; Kvile (yellow card) 78'	Stadium: Aker Stadion; Attendance: 3,621; Referee: Marius Lien

13 July 2024 14	Viking	2–0	Kristiansund	Stavanger
17:00 CEST (UTC+2)	Svendsen 46', 67'; Bell (yellow card) 79'; Urbančič (yellow card) 85'	Report		Stadium: SR-Bank Arena; Attendance: 10,126; Referee: Svein Tore Sinnes

28 July 2024 16	Tromsø	0–0	Kristiansund	Tromsø
17:00 CEST (UTC+2)	Antonsen (yellow card) 23'; Nordås (penalty missed) 34'	Report	Hopmark (yellow card) 64'; Sivertsen (yellow card) 90+1'	Stadium: Romssa Arena; Attendance: 4,006; Referee: Ola Hobber Nilsen

4 August 2024 17	Kristiansund	2–1	Lillestrøm	Molde
17:00 CEST (UTC+2)	Rakneberg 44'; Lien 49'; Lansing (yellow card) 90+4'	Report	Garnås (yellow card) 23'; Elkær 23'; Gabrielsen (yellow card) 53'	Stadium: Aker Stadion; Attendance: 3,374; Referee: Daniel Higraff

25 August 2024 20	Sandefjord	1–0	Kristiansund	Sandefjord
17:00 CEST (UTC+2)	Loftesnes-Bjune (yellow card) 41'; Jemal 90+5'	Report		Stadium: Jotun Arena; Attendance: 3,359; Referee: Mathias Støfringshaug

1 September 2024 21	Kristiansund	2–2	Haugesund	Kristiansund
17:00 CEST (UTC+2)	Lien 15'; Isaksen 46'; Ulvestad (yellow card) 66'; Rakneberg (yellow card) 85'	Report	Diarra (yellow card) 34'; Innvær 38'; Sauer (yellow card) 72'; Eskesen (yellow card) 74' (goal) 76'	Stadium: Kristiansund Stadion; Attendance: 3,927; Referee: Mohammad Usman Aslam

15 September 2024 22	Sarpsborg 08	0–2	Kristiansund	Sarpsborg
17:00 CEST (UTC+2)	Tebo (yellow card) 42'; Ørjasæter (yellow card) 89'	Report	George (yellow card) 23'; Sjåtil (yellow card) 32'; Tufekcic 61'; Lansing (yellow card) 78'; Lien (yellow card) 78'; Alte 80'	Stadium: Sarpsborg Stadion; Attendance: 5,383; Referee: Ola Hobber Nilsen

18 September 2024 19	Kristiansund	0–4	Molde	Kristiansund
18:00 CEST (UTC+2)	Tufekcic (yellow card) 54'; Lien (yellow card) 78'; Sivertsen (yellow card) 84'; Jeličić (yellow card) 90+2'	Report	Eikrem 7'; Haugan 23'; Brynhildsen 48'; Eriksen 61'; Amundsen (yellow card) 89'	Stadium: Kristiansund Stadion; Attendance: 4,030; Referee: Daniel Higraff
Note: Match originally scheduled for 18 August, but postponed due to Molde's participation in the UEFA Europa League.

22 September 2024 23	Kristiansund	0–0	Odd	Kristiansund
17:00 CEST (UTC+2)		Report	Mugeese (yellow card) 83'; Jørgensen (yellow card) 90'; Hien (yellow card) 90+2'	Stadium: Kristiansund Stadion; Attendance: 3,182; Referee: Kristoffer Hagenes

29 September 2024 24	Bodø/Glimt	4–0	Kristiansund	Bodø
17:00 CEST (UTC+2)	Hauge 25' (pen.), 45'; Bjørtuft 30'; Zinckernagel 63'	Report		Stadium: Aspmyra Stadion; Attendance: 5,415; Referee: Sivert Øksnes Amland

5 October 2024 15	Kristiansund	2–1	Sandefjord	Kristiansund
17:00 CEST (UTC+2)	Ndour 45+1', 51'; Igor (yellow card) 61'; Sjåtil (yellow card) 84'; Isaksen (yellow card) 90+2'; Mikaelsson (yellow card) 90+4'	Report	Sigurðarson 58'; Ottosson (yellow card) 66'; Kristiansen (red card) 75'	Stadium: Kristiansund Stadion; Attendance: 3,840; Referee: Rohit Saggi

20 October 2024 25	Kristiansund	0–0	Strømsgodset	Kristiansund
17:00 CEST (UTC+2)	Rakneberg (yellow card) 83'	Report	Krasniqi (yellow card) 76'	Stadium: Kristiansund Stadion; Attendance: 3,108; Referee: Marius Lien

27 October 2024 26	HamKam	1–0	Kristiansund	Hamar
17:00 CET (UTC+1)	Ofkir (yellow card) 21': Sørås (yellow card) 86'; Udahl 90+6' (pen.) (yellow card) 90+7'	Report	Isaksen (yellow card) 66'; George (yellow card) 90+3'	Stadium: Briskeby Stadion; Attendance: 3,134; Referee: Svein Tore Sinnes

3 November 2024 27	Fredrikstad	1–1	Kristiansund	Fredrikstad
17:00 CET (UTC+1)	Fall 45'	Report	Sivertsen 54' (pen.) (yellow card) 54'	Stadium: Fredrikstad Stadion; Attendance: 5,990; Referee: Mathias Støfringshaug

10 November 2024 28	Kristiansund	0–1	Viking	Kristiansund
17:00 CET (UTC+1)	Segberg (yellow card) 29'; Lien (yellow card) 45'	Report	Tripić 12'	Stadium: Kristiansund Stadion; Attendance: 3,395; Referee: Tore Hansen

23 November 2024 29	KFUM Oslo	1–2	Kristiansund	Oslo
17:00 CET (UTC+1)	Ndiaye 79'	Report	Mikaelsson 10'; Isaksen 59'; Lansing (yellow card) 70'	Stadium: KFUM Arena; Attendance: 2,348; Referee: Daniel Higraff

1 December 2024 30	Kristiansund	0–4	Rosenborg	Kristiansund
17:00 CET (UTC+1)	Isaksen (yellow card) 65'	Report	Nypan 20'; Broholm 49'; Tagseth 68'; Ceïde 78'; Sahsah (yellow card) 89'	Stadium: Kristiansund Stadion; Attendance: 4,309; Referee: Ola Hobber Nilsen

=== Norwegian Football Cup ===
10 April 2024 First round	Brattvåg	1–2	Kristiansund	Brattvåg
18:00 CEST (UTC+2)	Sundgot 61'	Report	Williamsen 7'; Guèye 35'	Stadium: Brattvåg gras Referee: Bendik Haarberg

24 April 2024 Second round	Træff	1–2	Kristiansund	Molde
18:00 CEST (UTC+2)	Flønes 9' (yellow card) 73'	Report	Willumsson 43'; Guèye 70'; Jarl (yellow card) 76'	Stadium: Reknesbanen; Attendance: 300; Referee: Torgeir Halsen

1 May 2024 Third round	Strømsgodset	4–0	Kristiansund	Drammen
16:00 CEST (UTC+2)	Krasniqi 25'; Stengel 41'; Therkelsen (yellow card) 40'; Tómasson 45+1'; Mehnert 82'	Report	Guèye (yellow card) 61'	Stadium: Marienlyst Stadion; Attendance: 2,098; Referee: Marius Lien
