= Farthings of Iceland =

Former administrative subdivisions of Iceland

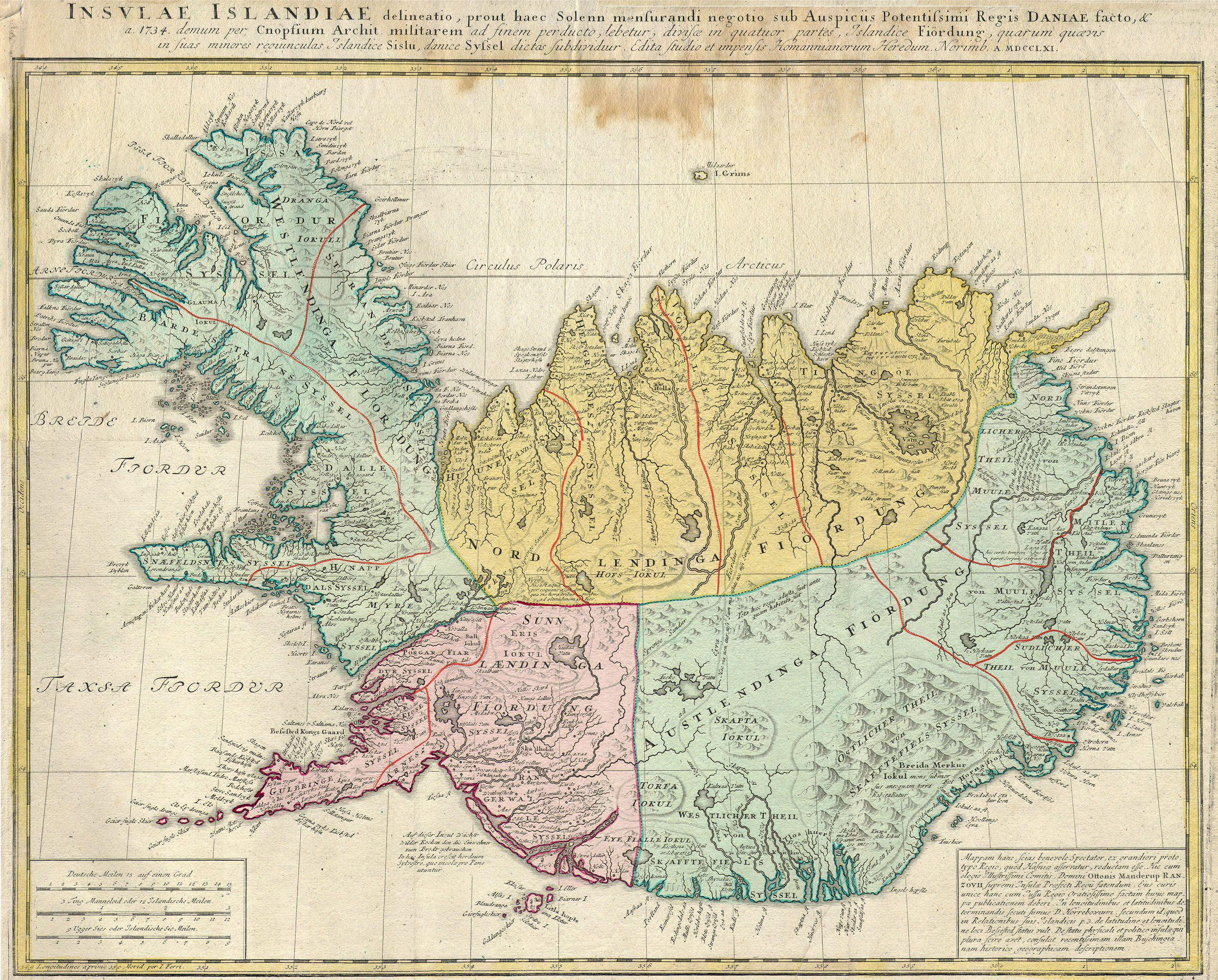
The historical farthings of Iceland on a map of 1761.

Historically, Iceland was divided into four farthings (landsfjórðungar, singular landsfjórðungur) corresponding to the cardinal directions. These were administrative divisions established in 965 for the purpose of organising regional assemblies called farthing assemblies (fjórðungsþing) and regional courts called farthing courts (fjórðungsdómar).

Each farthing held three local assemblies (usually in spring and autumn), which were each presided over by three goðar or chieftains. The North Farthing alone held four. Farthing courts would judge cases if both plaintiff and defendant belonged to the same assembly; otherwise the case was brought to the general assembly, the Alþingi. Little else is known about these farthing courts and they seem to have been much more irregular than the spring and autumn assemblies.

Also, in spite of the apparent regularity of three goðar per assembly and three to four assemblies per farthing, the system of rule by chieftains and assemblies probably followed a much more varied pattern.

The two dioceses of Iceland were divided along the farthing division in 1106 such that the diocese of Skálholt extended over three farthings (West, South, and East), and the diocese of Hólar extended over the North Farthing.

== The lawmen ==
Iceland had come under the King of Norway's sway in 1264, and a change of law came with Magnus the Lawmender's lawbook of 1271. According to this book (entitled Járnsíða or "Ironside"), a lawman was to be set over each farthing. Usually there were just two lawmen, one for the North and West Farthings and one for the South and East Farthings, but sometimes there were as many as four. At the same time the old assemblies muted into counties (sýslur) and the goðar were replaced by county sheriffs (sýslumenn) an office awarded by the king. The lawmen gradually became very powerful and the institution of a supreme court (yfirdómur) in 1593 was an attempt to curb their power instigated by their main competitors, the two bishops.

== Medical districts ==
In 1683 Iceland was made an amt or province within the kingdom of Denmark–Norway. In 1770 the country was divided into two amter, Southeast and Northwest, and the borders of the farthings were changed according to the new division. In effect, amter replaced the farthings.

In 1651 the king had granted permission for the construction of one hospital in each farthing. These were not hospitals in the modern sense but primarily intended as lazarets or leper colonies that later became shelters for vagrants and beggars. In 1766 the office of farthing doctor (fjórðungslæknir) was created, one for each farthing. Soon, however, the medical districts were further divided, first with the introduction of another doctor for the West Farthing in 1781 and then another for the eastern part of the South Farthing in 1799. For most of the 19th century these were the six medical districts in Iceland. In 1944 the state agreed to increase their funding of three hospitals outside of Reykjavík which would be designated as farthing hospitals (fjórðungssjúkrahús). These were the hospitals of Ísafjörður, Akureyri, and Neskaupstaður.

== Contemporary use of the term ==
Later administrative divisions of Iceland (notably the voting districts established with the Constitution of Iceland in 1874) were based on the division of counties and municipalities and the farthings gradually lost any official significance, although they are still used in common parlance to refer to parts of the country.

Currently there is only one form of local government in Iceland, the municipalities, the counties themselves having lost any official significance in the 1990s. Several times during the 20th century there have been regional organisations, societies, cooperation venues at the municipal level etc. based on the farthings. In 1980 one Jóhannes Árnason suggested reinstating the farthing assemblies as means of distributing power from the state to the regions, but this was not seriously considered. A more common way of dividing Iceland nowadays is the eight regions (landshlutar).

== Farthing divisions ==
- Vestfirðingafjórðungur or Breiðfirðingafjórðungur (the farthing of the Westfjorders or Breiðafjorders) originally stretched from Hrútafjörður in the north to the river Hvítá at Borgarfjörður, but in the 13th century was extended southward to the Botnsá at Hvalfjörður
- Norðlendingafjórðungur or Eyfirðingafjórðungur (the farthing of the Northerners or Eyjafjorders) stretched from Hrútafjörður in the west to Langanes in the east.
- Austfirðingafjórðungur (the farthing of the Eastfjorders) extended from Langanes to the river Jökulsá at Sólheimasandur in the south. However in 1783, when the Southern and Eastern amter were created, Skaftafellssýsla in the south was placed within the Southern amt and the border of the farthing thus moved northward to Lónsheiði. In 1893 East Skaftafellssýsla was made part of the Eastern amt, and the border thus moved southward again to the Skeiðará.
- Sunnlendingafjórðungur or Rangæingafjórðungur (the farthing of the Southerners or Rangæings) was really only the southwestern corner of the country, including the capital at Reykjavík.

== See also ==
- Landvættir
- Regions of Iceland
- Counties of Iceland
- Municipalities of Iceland
- Constituencies of Iceland
- Subdivisions of the Nordic countries
