= Selárdalur =

Valley in Iceland

Coordinates: 65°46′43″N 24°00′13″W

Selárdalur (Icelandic pronunciation: [ˈsɛːlˌaurˌtaːlʏr̥]) is the second most westerly of the Ketildalir in Arnarfjörður in Iceland. It was one of the main settled areas in the Westfjords.

The eponymous Selárdalur parish was formerly considered one of the country's best parishes, after Stóra-Laugardalssókn, which covered all of Tálknafjörður, was annexed to it. Gísli Jónsson, a priest in Selárdalur between 1547 and 1557, was bishop of Skálholt between 1558 and 1587.

Known people from Selárdalur include Bárður svarti Atlason (the grandfather of Hrafn Sveinbjarnarson), Páll Björnsson, Gísli á Uppsölum and Samúel Jónsson, the son of Jón Þorláksson frá Bægisá. Only one farm is currently inhabited.

== Farms ==
- Skarðsmýrarfoss (deserted during the Black Death)
- Grund (deserted in 1949)
- Kolbeinsskeið (deserted in 1961)
- Brautarholt (deserted in 1969)
- Uppsalir (deserted in 1986)
- Selárdalur (deserted in 1988)
- Neðribær (deserted in 2010)
- Tóft (uncertain)
- Skrúð (uncertain)
- Rimi (uncertain)
- Hús (uncertain)
- Fossá (uncertain)
- Krókur (uncertain)
- Kálfatjörn (uncertain)
- Melstaðir (uncertain)
