= Karl Kvaran =

Icelandic painter and draughtsman

- Born: Karl Kvaran; November 17, 1924; Borðeyri, Iceland
- Died: August 9, 1989 (aged 64); Reykjavík, Iceland

Karl Kvaran (November 17, 1924 – August 9, 1989) was an Icelandic painter and draughtsman. He is considered one of the principal exponents of the geometric abstractionist school of painting in Iceland in the early sixties.

== Education ==
Kvaran studied at the Iceland Academy of the Arts in Reykjavík (1943–45) and the Royal Danish Academy of Fine Arts, Copenhagen. He also studied under Peter Rostrup Bøyesen.

== Life ==
He was born in Borðeyri in western Iceland and died in Reykjavík.

== Career ==
In the early part of his career (1942–52) he worked in a French-influenced post-Cubist style. The sculpted, "hammered" surface texture of his strongly composed paintings was created using regular, abrupt brush strokes.

Kvaran was influenced by the abstract art of Svavar Guðnason and Þorvaldur Skúlason, an innovative development of the 1940s. Iceland experienced a period of prosperity in the post-war era and for the first time painters and writers began to form groups and movements. Kvaran and Kristján Davíðsson were important figures in the development of the geometric abstractionist school.

At the beginning of the 1950s Kvaran abandoned figurative art for geometrical abstraction, using pure, uniform color to create two-dimensional geometric forms. Kvaran was one of a number of Icelandic artists who contributed to a flourishing geometric abstraction movement during the 1950s.

Between 1958 and 1970 the structure of his large gouache paintings and pen-and-ink drawings became more relaxed, with straight lines replaced by a more rhythmic interplay of curved and circular shapes.

After 1970 Kvaran began painting much larger works in oil. Static formal shapes were replaced by more fluid constructions in intense shades of red, yellow, and blue, accompanied by areas of black and whites. This style is said to have reached the climax of its development around 1979. His work was characterized by thriftiness of style alongside increasingly complex dimensional interplay.

Kvaran is considered one of the main links between French-derived abstract painting and Minimalism. His daring use of intense color matched with graphic skills marks him as a bridge between abstraction and Pop Art.

Along with Benedikt Gunnarsson, Bragi Ásgeirsson, Eiríkur Smith, Gerður Helgadóttir, Gudmunda Andrésdóttir, Gudmundur Benediktsson, Hafsteinn Austmann, Hjörleifur Sigurdsson, Hördur Ágústsson, Jóhannes Jóhannesson, Jón Benediktsson, Kjartan Gudjónsson, Nína Tryggvadóttir, Svavar Gudnason, Sverrir Haraldsson, Valtyr Pétursson and Thorvaldur Skúlason. Kvaran's work was featured in a 1998 exhibition at the National Gallery of Iceland in Reykjavík, "The Dream of Pure Form, Geometric Art of the 1950s". His work also featured in the 1998 National Gallery of Iceland exhibition "Icelandic 20th Century Art".

The National Gallery of Iceland showed a retrospective of Kvaran's work in November 2010. A number of Kvaran's works and a picture of the artist are displayed at the Frost and Fire Guesthouse website .

The Icelandic musician and composer Haflidi Hallgrímsson has composed a violin tribute to Kvaran, a close friend, "Offerto (In Memoriam Karl Kvaran)".
