= Mikkel Rakneberg =

Norwegian footballer (born 2002)

Personal information
- Date of birth: 28 February 2002 (age 24)
- Place of birth: Rælingen, Norway
- Height: 1.87 m (6 ft 2 in)
- Position: Left-back

Team information
- Current team: OB (on loan from VfL Bochum)
- Number: 24

Youth career
- –2020: Lillestrøm

Senior career*
Years	Team	Apps	(Gls)
2019–2020	Lillestrøm 2	20	(3)
2021	Ull/Kisa	30	(7)
2021	Ull/Kisa 2	1	(0)
2022–2025	Kristiansund	85	(6)
2022	Kristiansund 2	5	(6)
2026–	VfL Bochum	5	(0)
2026–	→ OB (loan)	0	(0)
- * Club domestic league appearances and goals as of 8 March 2026

Mikkel Rakneberg (born 28 February 2002) is a Norwegian professional footballer who plays as a left-back for Danish Superliga club OB, on loan from 2. Bundesliga club VfL Bochum.

== Career ==
Rakneberg played youth football at Lillestrøm, before starting his senior career with Ull/Kisa in 2021. In January 2022, he signed a four-year contract with Kristiansund. On 3 April 2022, he made his Eliteserien debut in a 1–0 loss against Aalesund.

On 2 January 2026, Rakneberg signed a three-and-a-half-year contract with VfL Bochum in German 2. Bundesliga.

== Career statistics ==
As of 8 March 2026

Appearances and goals by club, season and competition
Club	Season	League			National Cup		Europe		Total	
Club	Season	Division	Apps	Goals	Apps	Goals	Apps	Goals	Apps	Goals
Lillestrøm 2	2019	3. divisjon	20	3	—		—		20	3
Ull/Kisa	2021	1. divisjon	30	7	2	1	—		32	8
Ull/Kisa 2	2021	3. divisjon	1	0	—		—		1	0
Kristiansund	2022	Eliteserien	3	0	2	1	—		5	1
Kristiansund	2023	1. divisjon	29	5	2	0	4 (Note: Appearances in Eliteserien play-offs)	2	35	7
Kristiansund	2024	Eliteserien	27	1	3	0	—		30	1
Kristiansund	2025	Eliteserien	26	0	3	0	—		29	0
Kristiansund	Total		85	6	10	1	4	2	99	9
Kristiansund 2	2022	4. divisjon	5	6	—		—		5	6
VfL Bochum	2025–26	2. Bundesliga	5	0	—		—		5	0
Career total			146	22	12	2	4	2	162	26
