= Borgarvirki =

Mountain in Iceland

- Volcanic plug
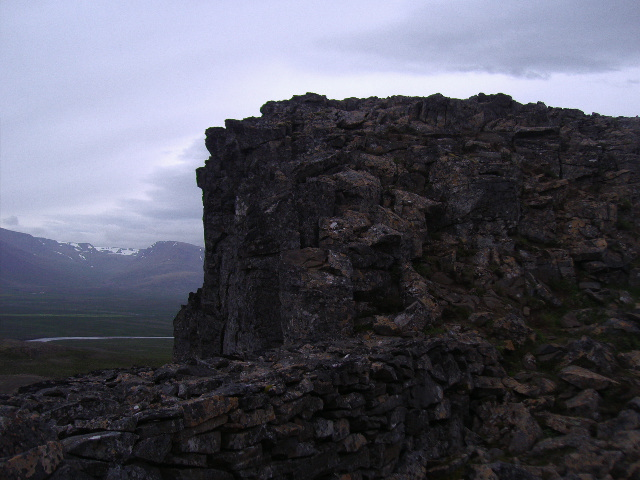

- Location within Iceland
- Coordinates: 65°28′29″N 20°35′49″W
- Location: North of Iceland
- Formed by: Lava from a volcanic vent
- Geology: Basalt strata

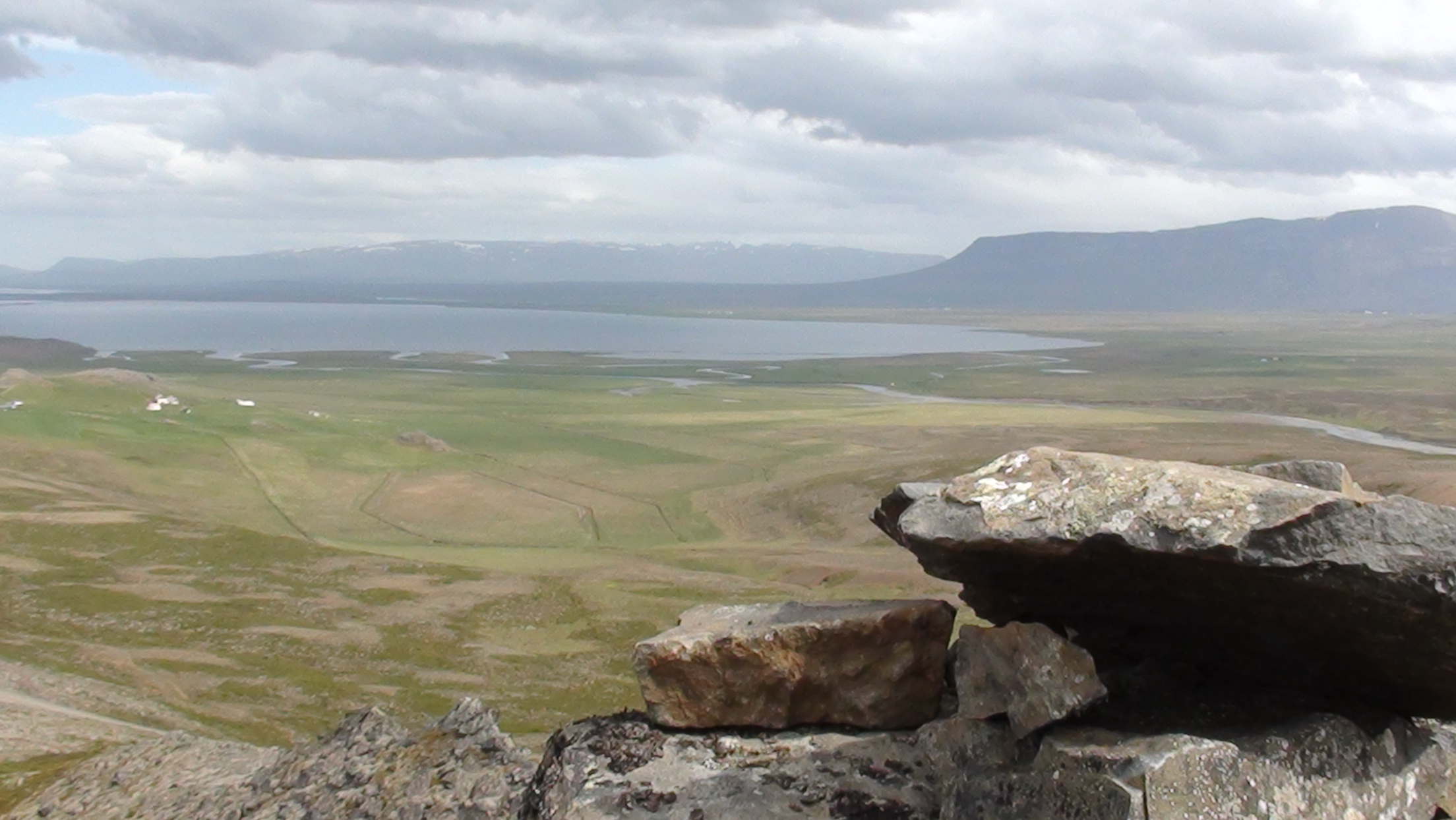
View from the top of Borgarvirki

Borgarvirki [ˈpɔrkarˌvɪr̥cɪ] is a volcanic plug (gosstapi [ˈkɔsːˌtʰaːpɪ]) that lies between Vesturhóp [ˈvɛstʏrˌhouːp] and Víðidalur [ˈviːðɪˌtaːlʏr̥] in the north of Iceland. Made out of basalt strata, at 177 metres (581 ft) above sea level it dominates the surrounding region. Although a natural phenomenon, Borgarvirki has been altered by humans in earlier centuries. In 1949, Borgarvirki was renovated by workers, who installed a granite lintel at the main entrance.

The Icelandic sagas mention that in earlier centuries it was used for military purposes. There is a viewing dial inside.

It is accessible to visitors travelling around the peninsula of Vatnsnes.

== See also ==
- List of columnar basalts in Iceland
