= Brú =

Icelandic road junction

Coordinates: 65.1100°N 21.0968°W

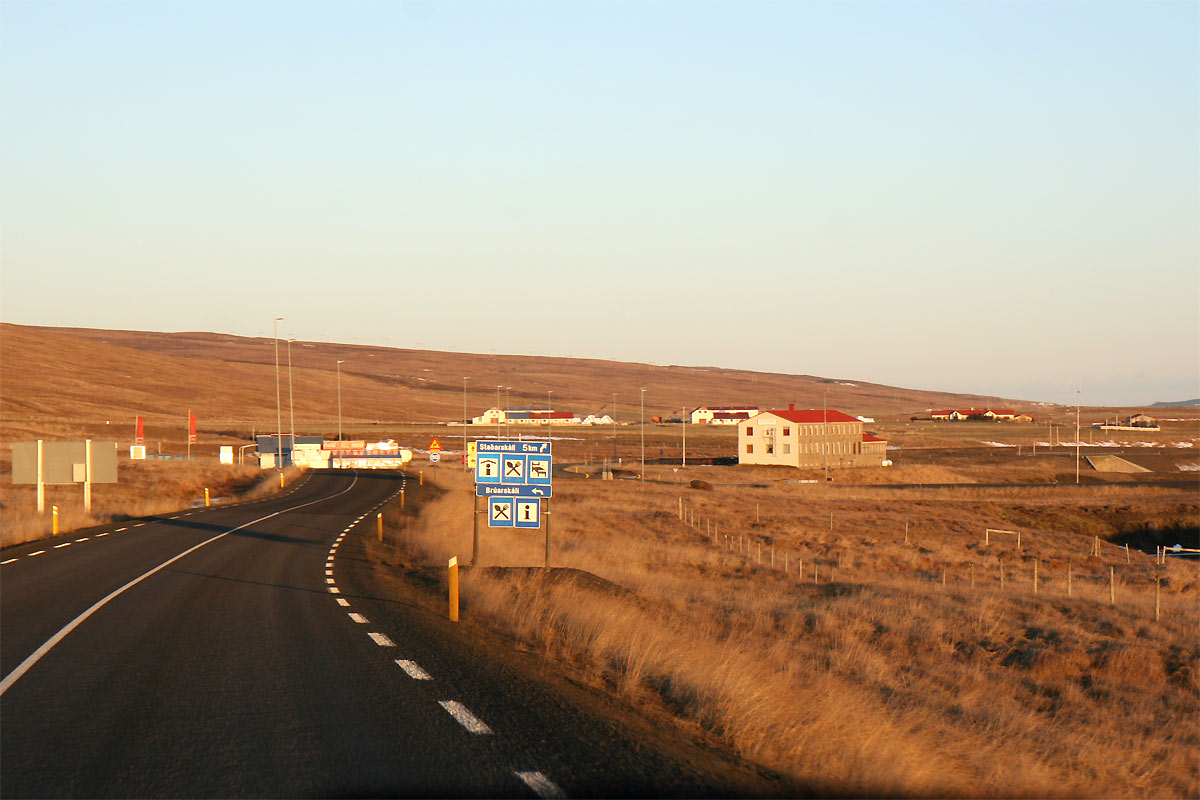
Junction and farmstead of Brú, November 2007

Brú (Icelandic pronunciation: [ˈpruː]) is a farmstead and road junction in northwestern Iceland in Vestur-Húnavatnssýsla county. It is located in the Northwest Political constituency. It has a filling station and a guesthouse. It is located at the southern tip of Hrútafjörður where the river Hrútafjarðará has its estuary with the Arctic Ocean.
