= Hvítserkur =

Icelandic landform

Coordinates: 65.60648°N 20.63563°W

- Stack
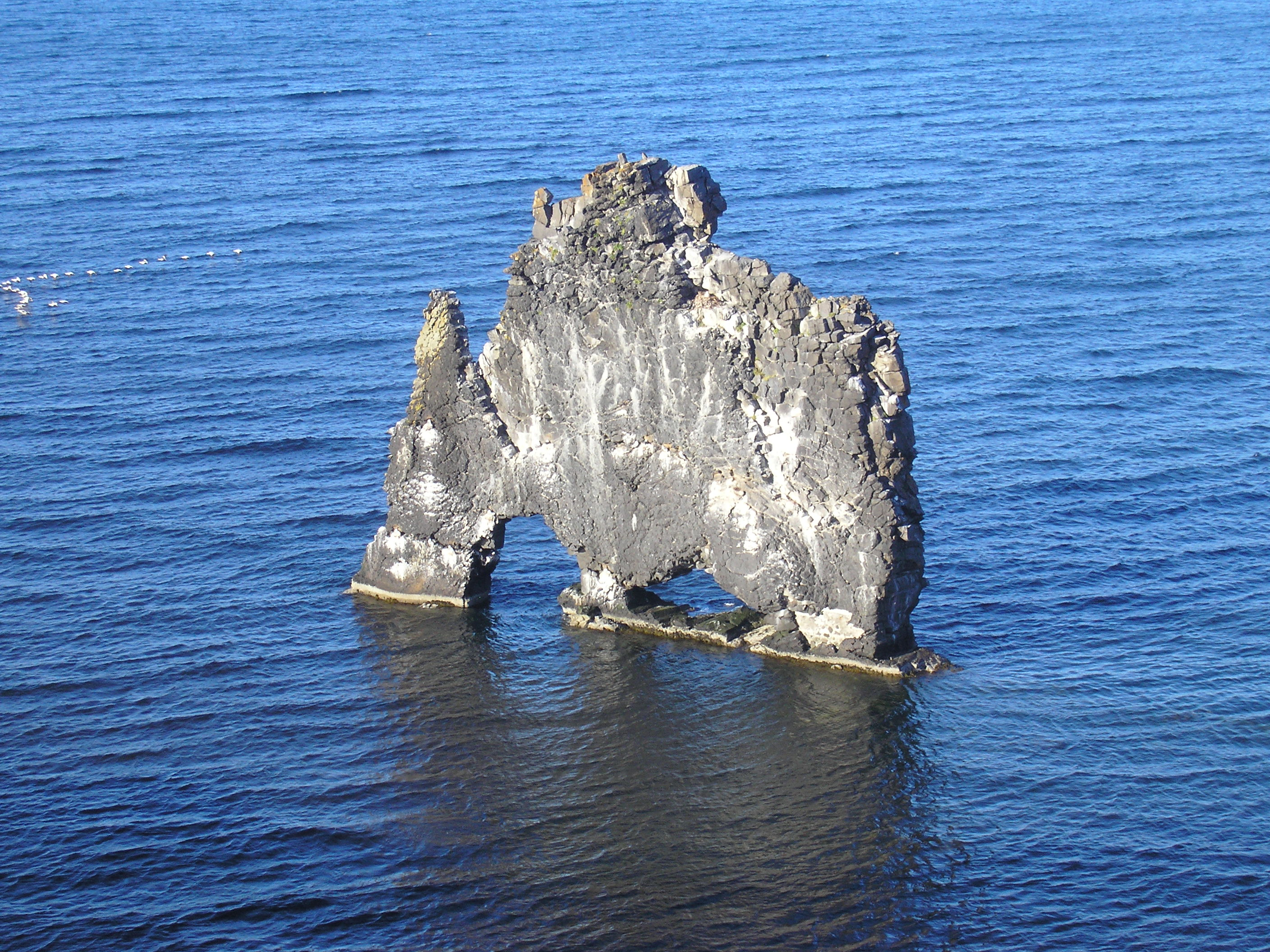
- Hvítserkur at full sea
- Interactive map of Hvítserkur
- Location: Vatnsnes, Iceland

Hvítserkur (Icelandic pronunciation: [ˈkʰvitˌsɛr̥kʏr̥], regionally also [-ˌsɛrkʰʏr̥]) is a 15 m high basalt stack along the eastern shore of the Vatnsnes peninsula, in northwest Iceland.

The rock has two holes at the base, which give it the appearance of a dragon that is drinking. The base of the stack has been reinforced with concrete to protect its foundations from the sea.

== Folklore and tourism ==
Local tradition holds that Hvítserkur is the petrified remains of a troll that tried to destroy the nearby monastery at Þingeyrar and was turned to stone by the rising sun. In the mid-20th century, farmers concerned that the sea-eroded "troll" might topple reinforced its base with concrete, a gesture born as much of practical care as of cultural attachment.

Today Hvítserkur attracts large numbers of visitors, but the lack of marked paths has led to trampling of nearby bird-nesting sites and seal haul-outs on the adjacent gravelbanks. This has sparked debate among landowners, local authorities and conservationists over how to balance free access, visitor safety and wildlife protection—an issue made more pressing by the rock's iconic status in Icelandic tourism.

== Geology ==
The Hvítserkur ignimbrite is a caldera-fill pyroclastic flow that forms one of the largest ignimbrite sheets in north-east Iceland, cropping out as a striking light-coloured mountain at Hvítserkur. This welded tuff displays a characteristic beige to pink hue and is traversed by a complex network of basaltic dikes. In several exposures, the ignimbrite is overlain by hyaloclastites and pillow-lava breccias, implying that after the explosive silicic eruption a shallow lake existed within the caldera, into which subaqueous volcanism continued.

The Hvítserkur ignimbrite was emplaced during the early Miocene (about 13–12 million years ago, or Ma) along the Borgarfjörður Eystri–Loðmundarfjörður rift zone, a series of extinct central volcanoes now buried beneath later basaltic plateau lavas. Radiometric dates of 12.5 ± 0.6 and 13.1 ± 0.2 Ma from adjacent complexes bracket its age, making it one of the oldest well-preserved silicic products in Iceland. Ongoing petrological and isotopic studies aim to clarify how such voluminous felsic magmas are generated and preserved in an otherwise dominantly basaltic tectonic setting.

== Caldera structure and post-eruption evolution ==
Beneath the Hvítserkur ignimbrite lies a trapdoor-style collapse caldera measuring roughly 7.5 × 4.5 km in plan view. Field measurements of the surrounding basalt flows—dipping steeply towards the caldera centre—together with ignimbrite thicknesses of up to 410 m on the northern wall, 277 m to the west and 180 m to the south, reveal a broad, bowl-shaped depression that was filled by this single explosive eruption.

Once the ignimbrite had accumulated, the caldera hosted a shallow lake into which up to 70 m of sandstones, siltstones and mudstones collected. These lake sediments often show small ripple marks and drying cracks, and they are topped by a roughly 5 m-thick ash-flow layer—evidence that the water level fell from time to time, exposing the basin and allowing fresh eruptions to pour hot ash and pumice back into the lake.

Following sedimentation, numerous olivine-basalt dikes and sills intruded both the ignimbrite and lake beds; several of these intrusions fed hyaloclastite and pillow-lava breccias that record continuing, subaqueous volcanism. The very summit of Hvítserkur is finally capped by subaerial basalt flows, marking the return to dominantly mafic eruptions.

The small hill Hvítafjall rising from the caldera floor consists of strongly altered rhyolite breccias and is interpreted as an intra-caldera lava dome or plug, recording late-stage magmatic resurgence. Three-dimensional reconstruction of the top and base surfaces of the ignimbrite suggests an original pyroclastic volume of approximately 4 km^{3} before erosional removal of its upper parts.
