= Járnsíða =

Járnsíða (Icelandic pronunciation: [ˈjau(r)tn̥ˌsiːða], ironside, Old Norse pronunciation: [ˈjɒːrnˌsiːða]) was a law-code which Magnus VI of Norway had composed for Iceland, which came formally under Norwegian control during 1262–1264. Járnsíða was introduced over 1271–1273, superseding the previous law-code Grágás. Amongst other things, Járnsíða formally put all legislative powers in the hands of the King, abolished the goðar, and reformed the Alþingi. In 1281, Járnsíða was itself superseded by Jónsbók.

== See also ==
- Law of Iceland
