= Karólína Lárusdóttir =

Icelandic artist (1944–2019)

Karólína_Lárusdóttir
- Born: March 12, 1944
- Died: February 7, 2019 (aged 74)
- Education: Ruskin School of Art
- Known for: printmaking

Karólína Lárusdóttir (March 12, 1944 – February 7, 2019) was an Icelandic artist.

== Biography ==
Born in Reykjavik on March 12, 1944, Karólína was brought up in the Hotel Borg, the first grand hotel in the city, owned by her grandfather. She studied at the Ruskin School of Art.

Karólína became an elected member of the New English Art Club. In addition, she was granted full elected membership to both the Royal Society of Painter-Printmakers in 1986 and the Royal Watercolour Society in 1996.

She won the Dicks and Greenbury in 1989 and the 4th Triennale Mondiale D'Estampes Petit Format in France and a special award at the Premio Biella Internazionale per L'Incisione in Italy in 1990. She was nominated as the graphic artist of the Year 2005 by Íslensk Grafik (Icelandic Printmaker's Association), highlighting her contributions to the Icelandic art scene. In 2012, Karólína received the Aberystwyth University School of Art Collection Prize.

Her artwork has been exhibited in galleries across the United Kingdom and Iceland, including exhibitions at The Royal Academy Summer show.

Karólína died on February 7, 2019.

== Collections ==
Her work is in the collection of the Nelson-Atkins Museum of Art and the Beecroft Art Gallery.
