= Michael Lansing =

American soccer player (born 1994)

Mike Lansing
Personal information
- Full name: Mike Lansing
- Date of birth: June 13, 1994 (age 32)
- Place of birth: Randolph, New Jersey, United States
- Height: 1.93 m (6 ft 4 in)
- Position: Goalkeeper

Team information
- Current team: Kristiansund
- Number: 1

College career
| Years | Team | Apps | (Gls) |
| 2012–2015 | Bucknell Bison | | |

Senior career*
| Years | Team | Apps | (Gls) |
| 2014–2016 | New York Red Bulls U-23 | | |
| 2016–2017 | Vejle | 2 | (0) |
| 2017–2019 | AaB | 0 | (0) |
| 2019–2020 | Horsens | 14 | (0) |
| 2021–2023 | Aalesund | 32 | (0) |
| 2024– | Kristiansund | 34 | (0) |
- * Club domestic league appearances and goals as of May 27, 2026

Michael Lansing (born June 13, 1994) is an American professional soccer player who plays as a goalkeeper for Norwegian club Kristiansund BK.

Born and raised in Randolph, New Jersey, Lansing played prep soccer at Randolph High School.

== Career ==
Lansing was the starting goalkeeper for the New York Red Bulls U-23 team that won the 2014 NPSL Championship. After graduating from Bucknell University Lansing signed with Vejle Boldklub, who at the time were playing in the Danish 1st Division. Lansing was announced to be signing with AaB six months after moving to Denmark and stayed at Vejle Boldklub for one season in total.

Lansing made his debut for AaB in the Landspokal Cup against FC Roskilde on September 26, 2018. Lansing appeared again in the cup against fellow Superliga club AC Horsens on October 31, 2018, and kept a clean sheet in the 1–0 quarter final victory.

He joined AC Horsens for the 2019–20 season.

After three years at Aalesund, Lansing joined Kristiansund BK ahead of the 2024 season, signing a two-year deal.

== Career statistics ==
As of match played April 20, 2025

Appearances and goals by club, season and competition
| Club | Season | League | | | National cup (Note: Includes Danish Cup, Norwegian Cup) | | Total | |
| Club | Season | Division | Apps | Goals | Apps | Goals | Apps | Goals |
|---|---|---|---|---|---|---|---|---|
| Vejle | 2016-17 | Danish 1st Division | 2 | 0 | 0 | 0 | 2 | 0 |
| AaB | 2017-18 | Danish Superliga | 0 | 0 | 0 | 0 | 0 | 0 |
| AaB | 2018-19 | Danish Superliga | 0 | 0 | 1 | 0 | 1 | 0 |
| AaB | Total | | 0 | 0 | 1 | 0 | 1 | 0 |
| Horsens | 2019-20 | Danish Superliga | 14 | 0 | 0 | 0 | 14 | 0 |
| Horsens | 2020-21 | Danish Superliga | 0 | 0 | 0 | 0 | 0 | 0 |
| Horsens | Total | | 14 | 0 | 0 | 0 | 14 | 0 |
| Aalesunds | 2021 | Norwegian First Division | 30 | 0 | 1 | 0 | 31 | 0 |
| Aalesunds | 2022 | Eliteserien | 0 | 0 | 0 | 0 | 0 | 0 |
| Aalesunds | 2023 | Eliteserien | 2 | 0 | 0 | 0 | 2 | 0 |
| Aalesunds | Total | | 32 | 0 | 1 | 0 | 33 | 0 |
| Aalesund 2 | 2023 | Norwegian Second Division | 9 | 0 | — | | 9 | 0 |
| Kristiansund | 2024 | Eliteserien | 30 | 0 | 0 | 0 | 30 | 0 |
| Kristiansund | 2023 | Eliteserien | 3 | 0 | 0 | 0 | 3 | 0 |
| Kristiansund | Total | | 33 | 0 | 0 | 0 | 33 | 0 |
| Career total | | | 90 | 0 | 2 | 0 | 92 | 0 |
