= Vatnsnes =

Peninsula jutting into Húnaflói in northern Iceland

Coordinates: 65.620°N 20.718°W

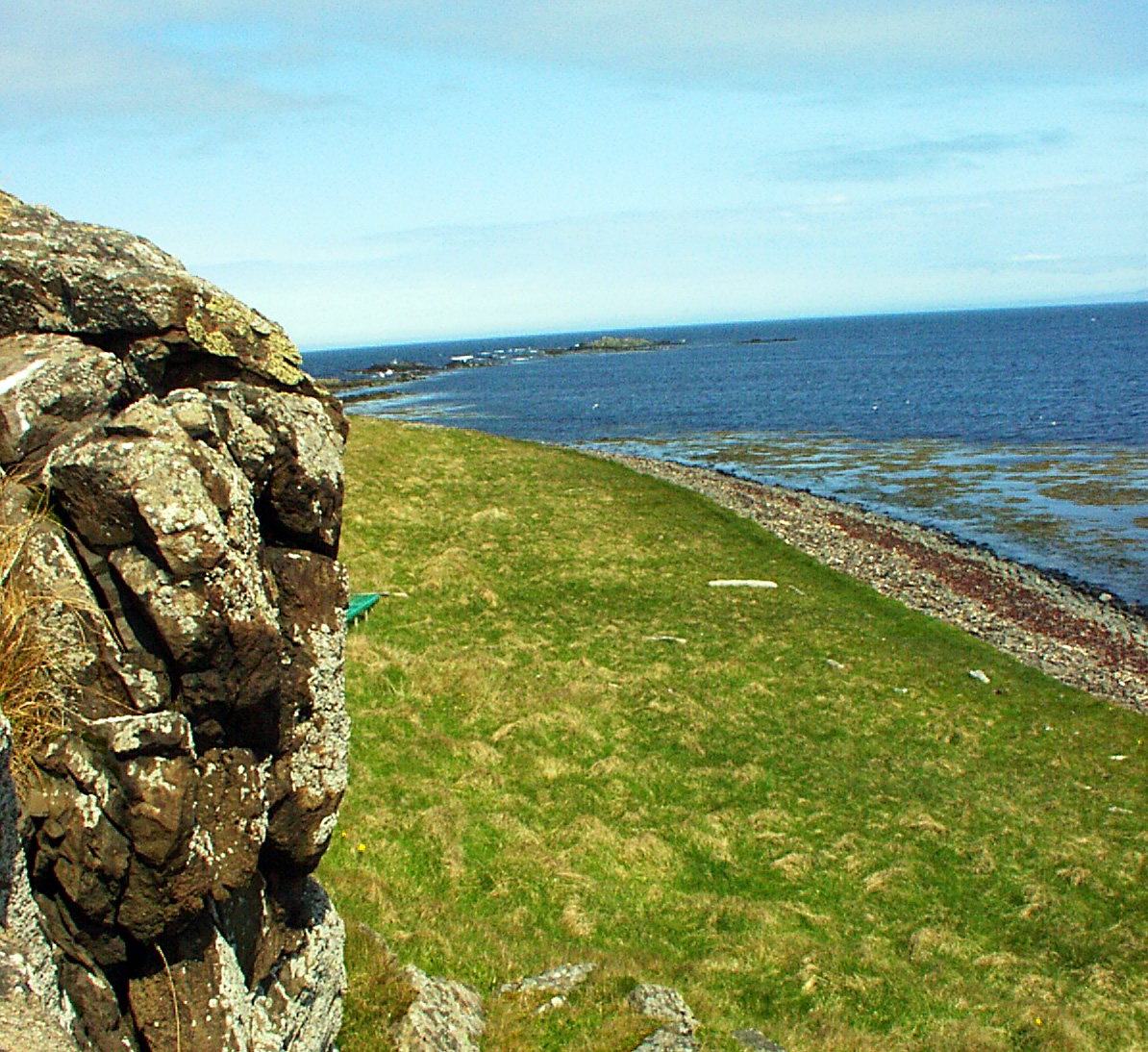
The Hindisvík bay

Vatnsnes (Icelandic pronunciation: [ˈvasːˌnɛːs]) is a peninsula jutting into Húnaflói in northern Iceland. It is surrounded by waters of Miðfjörður on the west and Húnafjörður [ˈhuːnaˌfjœrðʏr̥] on the east. It is home to one of the largest seal colonies in Iceland, among others at Hindisvík [ˈhɪntɪsˌviːk] and Ósar [ˈouːsar̥]. Seals have been protected for many years in Hindisvík. A stone hut was built at Ósar on the eastern side of the peninsula for seal watching.

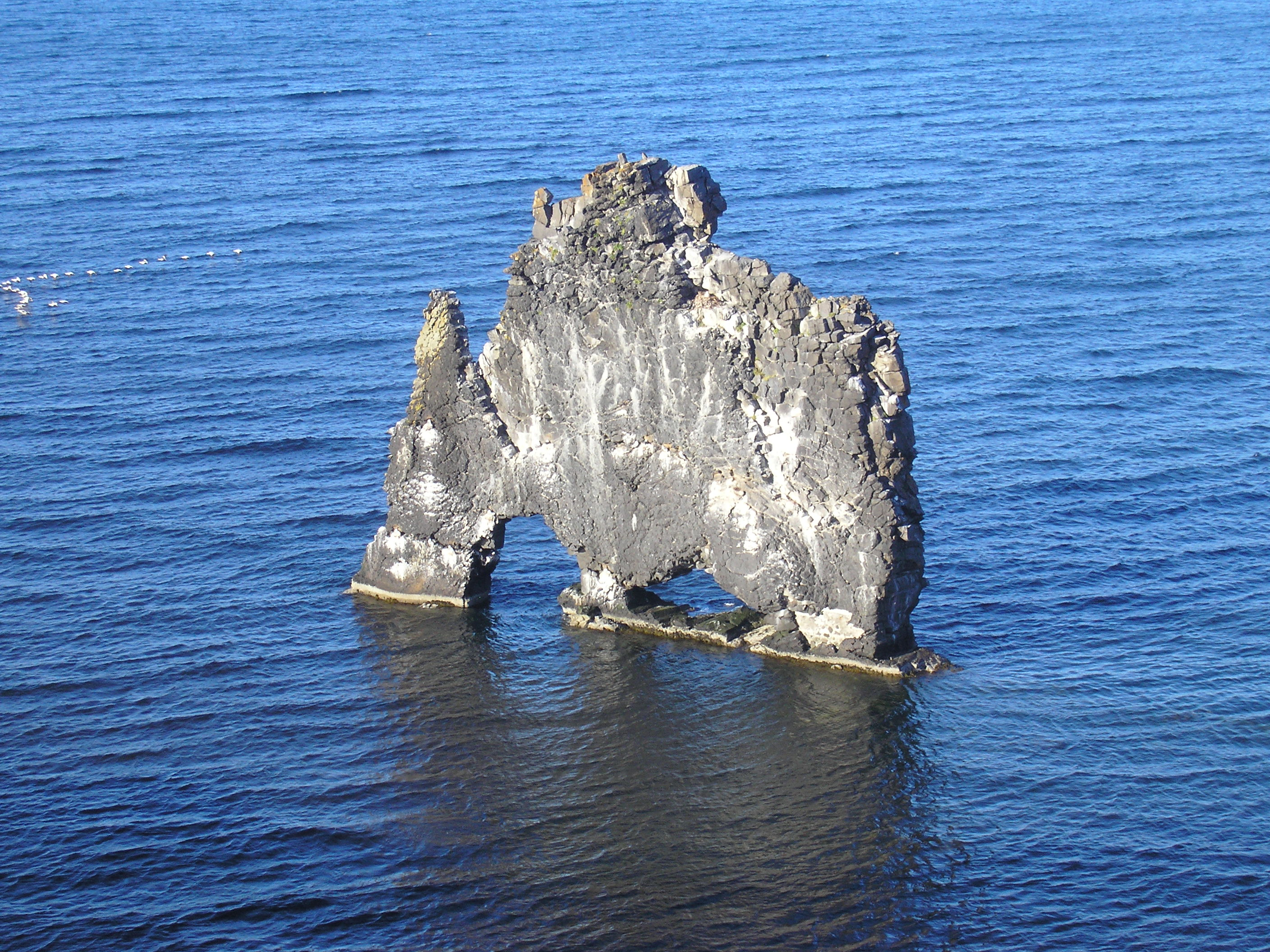
Hvítserkur

Among geological features of Vatnsnes are Borgarvirki, a volcanic plug mentioned for its use as a fortress in the Sagas of Icelanders, and Hvítserkur, a 15 m high basalt rock formation near the eastern shore of the peninsula.
