= Hafliði Másson =

Icelandic goði and chieftain

Hafliði Másson (died 1130; Old Norse: [ˈhɑvˌliðe ˈmɑːsˌson]; Modern Icelandic: [ˈhavˌlɪːðɪ ˈmausˌsɔːn]) was an Icelandic goði and chieftain in the eleventh to twelfth centuries. He is best known for his dealings with Þorgils Oddason (1080–1151) and for having Iceland's law codified as the text that came to be known as Grágás. Hafliði was the son of the goði Már Húnröðarson from Breiðabólstaður í Vesturhópi; they claimed direct patrilineal descent from the settler Ævar gamli Ketilsson, whose dynasty was known as the Æverlingar.
