= Gray Goose Laws =

Laws from the Icelandic Commonwealth period

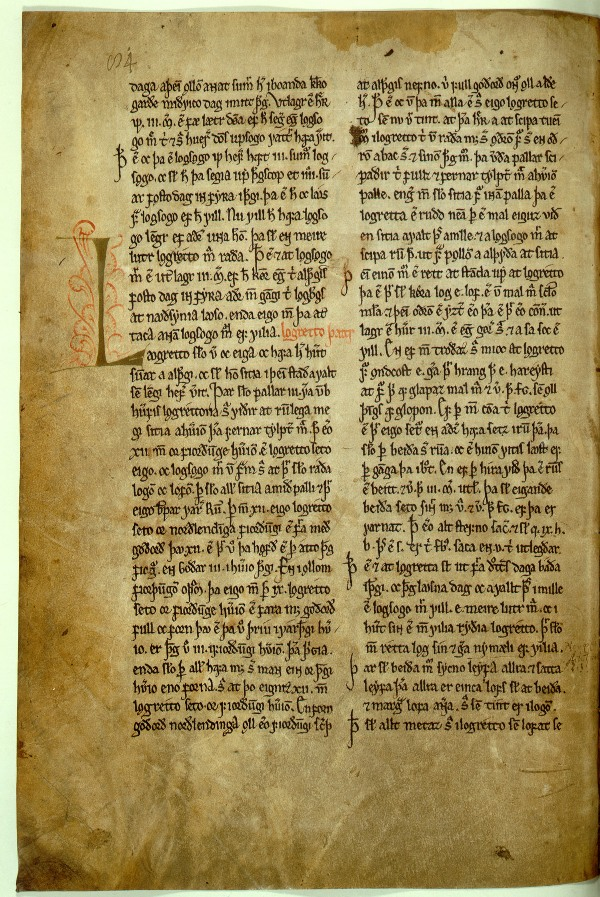
Grágás GKS 1157 fol.

The Gray Goose Laws (Icelandic: Grágás, Icelandic pronunciation: [ˈkrauːˌkauːs], Old Norse pronunciation: [ˈgrɒːˌgɒːs]) are a collection of laws from the Icelandic Commonwealth period. The term Grágás was originally used in a medieval source to refer to a collection of Norwegian laws and was probably mistakenly used to describe the existing collection of Icelandic law during the sixteenth century. The Grágás laws in Iceland were presumably in use until 1262–1264 when Iceland was taken over by the Norwegian crown.

== Origins of Icelandic law ==
According to Ari Thorgilsson, the earliest Icelandic laws were modeled on those from the Norwegian west-coast law-province, Gulathing. These were introduced to Iceland by an immigrant from Norway named Úlfljótr, sometime during the 920's. Following several years of modification and revision, Úlfljótr's laws were approved by an initial assembly. Out of this meeting, the annual general assembly known as the Althing was established. Each following summer, Icelanders would convene at Thingvellir for legislative and judicial meetings which would be supervised by the Lawspeaker.

== Etymology ==
The term "Gray Goose Laws", used to describe the laws of the Icelandic Commonwealth by the 16th century, may reflect that

- the laws were written with a goose quill, or
- the laws were bound in goose skin, or
- the laws were old, and it was then believed that geese lived longer than other birds.

== Manuscripts ==
The existing Icelandic Commonwealth laws that now exist as the Grágás never actually existed in one complete volume during medieval times. The Grágás does not contain a unified body of law, as arguably one never existed in the Icelandic Commonwealth. Instead, the Grágás was derived from two smaller, fragmentary volumes known as the Konungsbók (Copenhagen, Royal Library, GKS 1157 fol), apparently written around 1260, and Staðarhólsbók (Reykjavík, Árni Magnússon Institute for Icelandic Studies, AM 334 fol), apparently written in 1280. The ornate detail and appearance of the volumes suggests that they were created for a wealthy, literate man, though scholars cannot be certain. Because the Grágás laws originally existed in two different forms, each has a unique written account of the law. Sometimes the Konungsbók and Staðarhólsbók present different information, sometimes complementary information, and sometimes contradictory information. This could represent the way in which the law was interpreted differently by different scribes or by different citizens.

According to the Grágás, one third of the Icelandic laws were recited by the Law Speaker at the Icelandic national parliament, the Alþingi, each year over a three-year period. In 1117, the Alþingi decided that all the laws should be written down and this was accomplished at Hafliði Másson’s farm over that winter and published the following year.

These laws remained in force until 1271–1273 at which time the Ironside Laws—based on Norwegian laws—were adopted. There is scholarly disagreement, however, about how representative the Grágás are regarding the legal tradition that existed during Viking age Iceland. Arguably, the codification of oral law in the Grágás better represents Icelandic legal tradition post-Christianity, thus after the year 1000.
