= Samúel Jónsson =

Icelandic painter (1884-1969)

Samúel Jónsson (September 15, 1884 – January 5, 1969) was a farmer in Brautarholt in Selárdalur in Ketildalahreppur in Arnarfjörður. He was often known as Samúel Jónsson í Selárdal or Listamaðurinn með barnshjartað ("Artist with the child's heart") and was a famous folk artist that would come to Iceland later in his life.

Samúel painted a lot of young men, and his large career began when he built a church with a completed tower on his estate.
