= Bæjarhreppur =

Coordinates: 65°12′36″N 21°05′53″W

- Former municipality
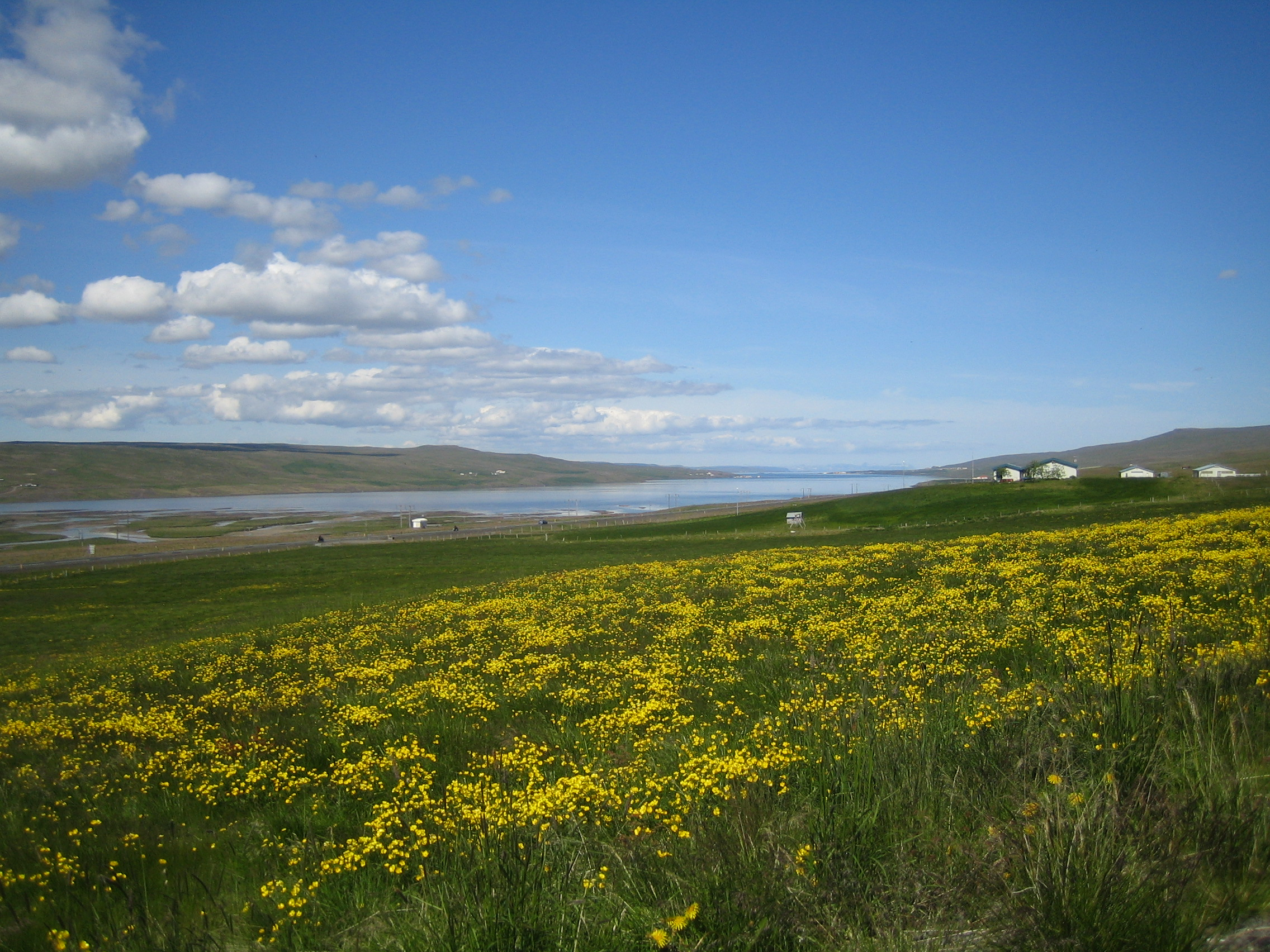

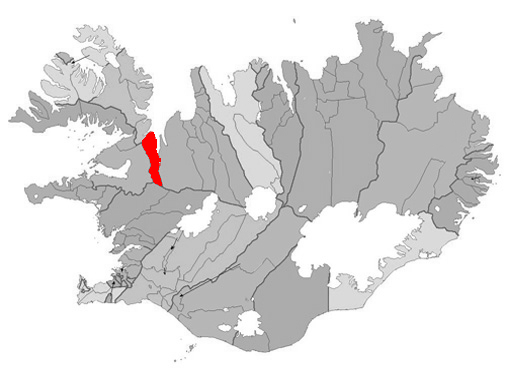
- Location of the Municipality of Bæjarhreppur
- Country: Iceland
- Constituency: Northwest Constituency
- Region: Northwestern Region
- Abolished: 2012

Area
  - Total: 513 km^{2} (198 sq mi)

Population (January 2011)
  - Total: 100
- Time zone: UTC+0 (GMT)
- Postcode: 500

Bæjarhreppur (Icelandic pronunciation: [ˈpaiːjar̥ˌr̥ɛhpʏr̥]) is a former municipality in Iceland.

According to the 2011 census, it had a population of 100 inhabitants.
