= Regions of Iceland =

Administrative divisions of Iceland

The regions of Iceland are eight areas of Iceland that roughly follow the arrangement of parliamentary constituencies as they were between 1959 and 2003. These regions are not incorporated polities but rather recognized groupings of municipalities. Iceland only has two levels of administration, the national government and 62 municipalities. The municipalities have organized themselves into eight regional associations and those boundaries are also recognized by Statistics Iceland to report statistics. Since 2014, police and commissioner (sýslumaður) districts have followed the eight region model with the exception that Vestmannaeyjar forms a special district and not part of the Southern Region. The divisions of Iceland for the purposes of health care and district courts diverge more from the commonly used eight region model.

The postal code system also roughly corresponds with the regions with the first digit of the three digit codes usually being the same as on the map below.

== Overview ==

No.	English name	Native name	Population (2025)	Area (km^{2})	Population density (per km^{2})	ISO 3166-2	Number of municipalities	Largest town
1	Capital Region	Höfuðborgarsvæðið	249,054	1,046	238.10	IS-1	7	Reykjavík
2	Southern Peninsula	Suðurnes	29,577	813	36.38	IS-2	4	Reykjanesbær
3	Western Region	Vesturland	17,761	9,527	1.86	IS-3	9	Akranes
4	Westfjords	Vestfirðir	7,176	8,842	0.81	IS-4	8	Ísafjörður
5	Northwestern Region	Norðurland vestra	7,355	13,108	0.56	IS-5	4	Sauðárkrókur
6	Northeastern Region	Norðurland eystra	32,026	22,677	1.41	IS-6	11	Akureyri
7	Eastern Region	Austurland	11,217	15,706	0.71	IS-7	4	Egilsstaðir
8	Southern Region	Suðurland	35,278	30,983	1.14	IS-8	15	Selfoss
	Iceland	Ísland	389,444	102,702	3.79	IS	62	Reykjavík

== Differences from the 1959-2003 constituencies ==
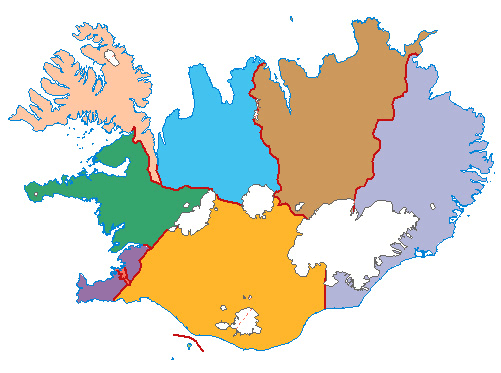
Constituencies in use between 1959 and 2003

Until 1957, the parliamentary constituencies used in Iceland had been based on its counties and market towns. The reform of constituency borders in 1957 would group these counties and towns together into eight larger areas that form the basis for the modern regional division of Iceland. The differences between the 1957 boundaries and the modern ones are:

- The southwestern part of the country was previously divided into Reykjavík on one hand and Reykjanes on the other which encompassed all other municipalities in the vicinity of Reykjavík and on the Reykjanes peninsula. The same area is currently divided into the Capital region on one hand and the Southern Peninsula on the other
- The municipality of Hornafjörður decided in 2008 to leave the association for municipalities in the Eastern region and join the Southern region. Statistics Iceland updated its definition of the statistical regions to reflect this on 1 December 2020.
- The area of the former town of Siglufjörður was transferred from the Northwestern region to the Northeastern region when the town merged across the regional boundary with Ólafsfjörður to form Fjallabyggð in 2006.
- The area of the former municipality of Skeggjastaðahreppur was transferred from the Eastern region to the Northeastern region when the municipality merged across the regional boundary with Þórshafnarhreppur to form Langanesbyggð in 2006.
- The area of the former municipality of Bæjarhreppur was transferred from the Westfjords region to the Northwestern region when the municipality merged across the regional boundary with Húnaþing vestra under the name of the latter in 2012.

== See also ==
- Administrative divisions of Iceland
- Farthings of Iceland
- Municipalities of Iceland
- Constituencies of Iceland
- Subdivisions of the Nordic countries
- ISO 3166-2:IS
