= Hrútafjörður =

Fjord in Iceland

Coordinates: 65°21′N 21°09′W

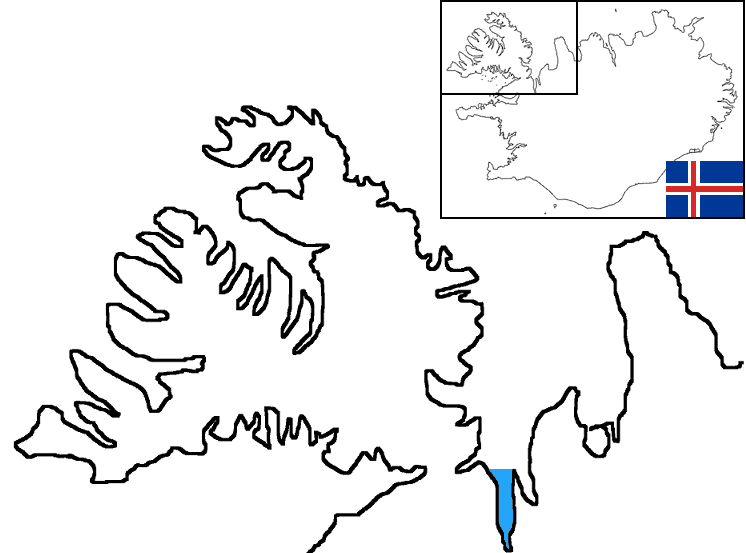
Location of Hrútafjörður

Hrútafjörður (Icelandic pronunciation: [ˈr̥uːtaˌfjœrðʏr̥]) is a fjord in the north-west of Iceland. It is around 36 km long and lies to the south of Húnaflói bay.

There are a few farmsteads on the shores of the fjord, and one (tiny) village, Borðeyri, with 16 inhabitants.
The junction and farmstead of Brú is at its southern tip; it serves as a local agricultural service station.

"Hrúta" is plural possessive of "Hrútur" which means the male sheep.

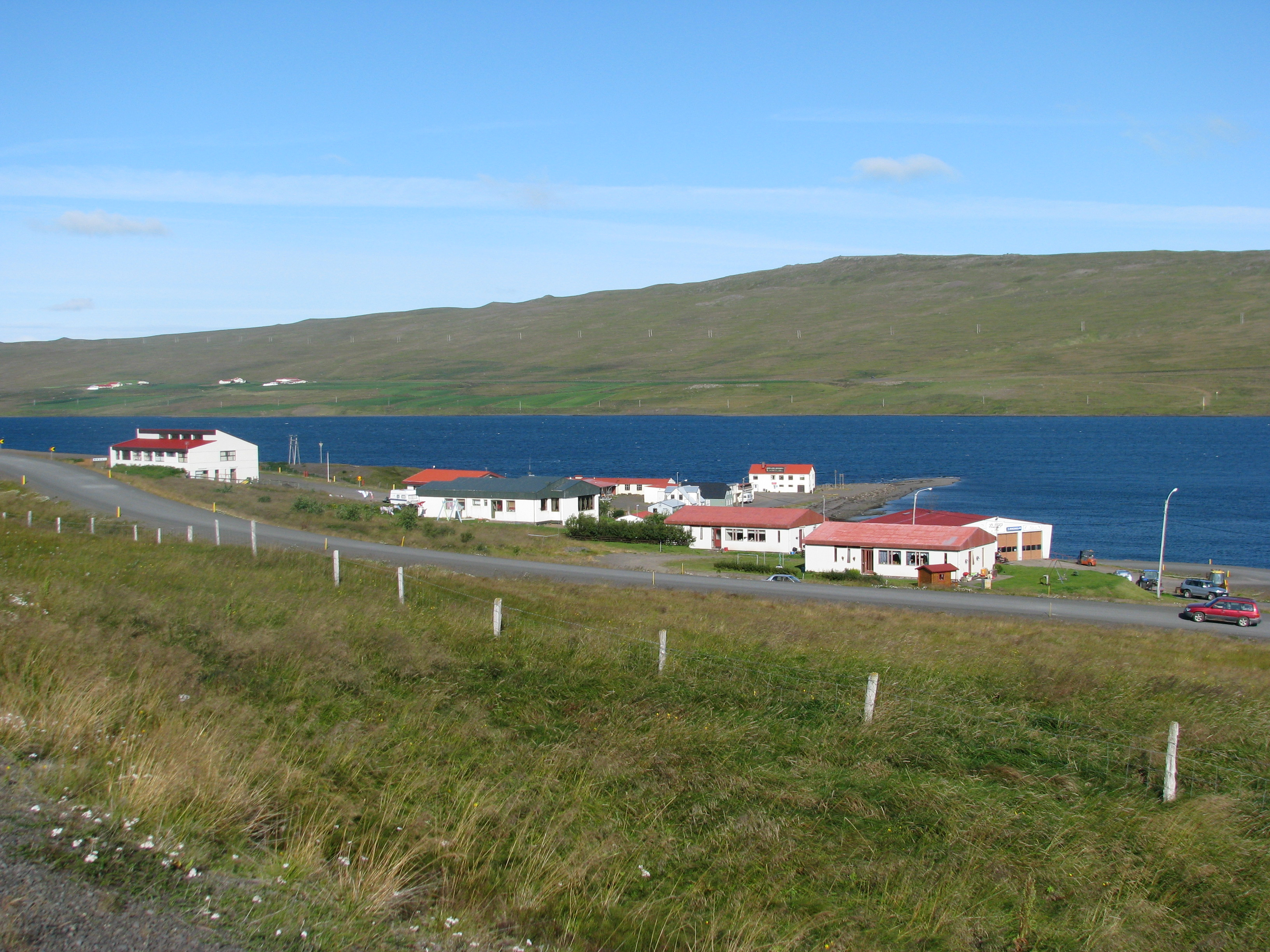
Borðeyri

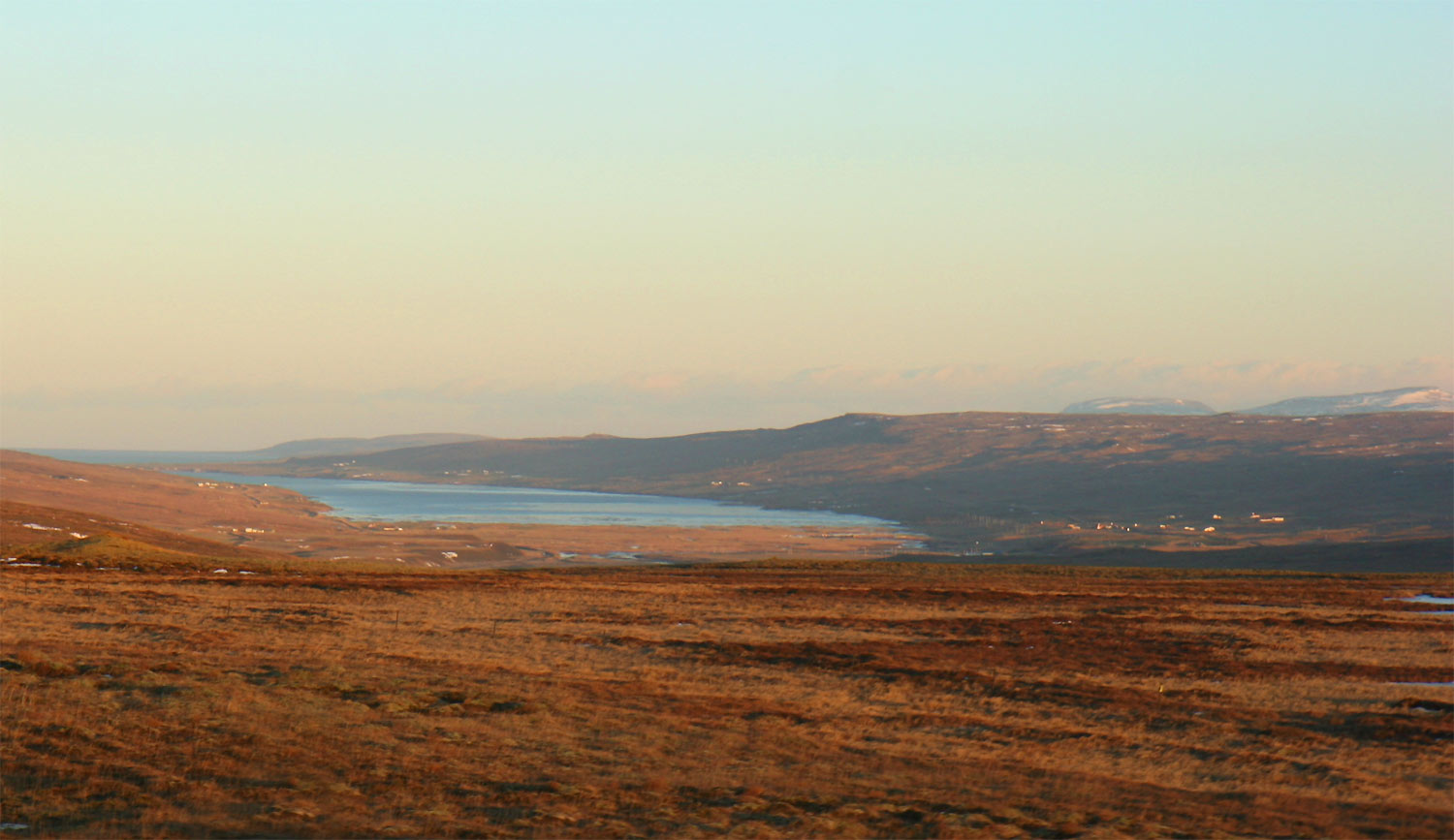
Southern end of Hrútafjörður

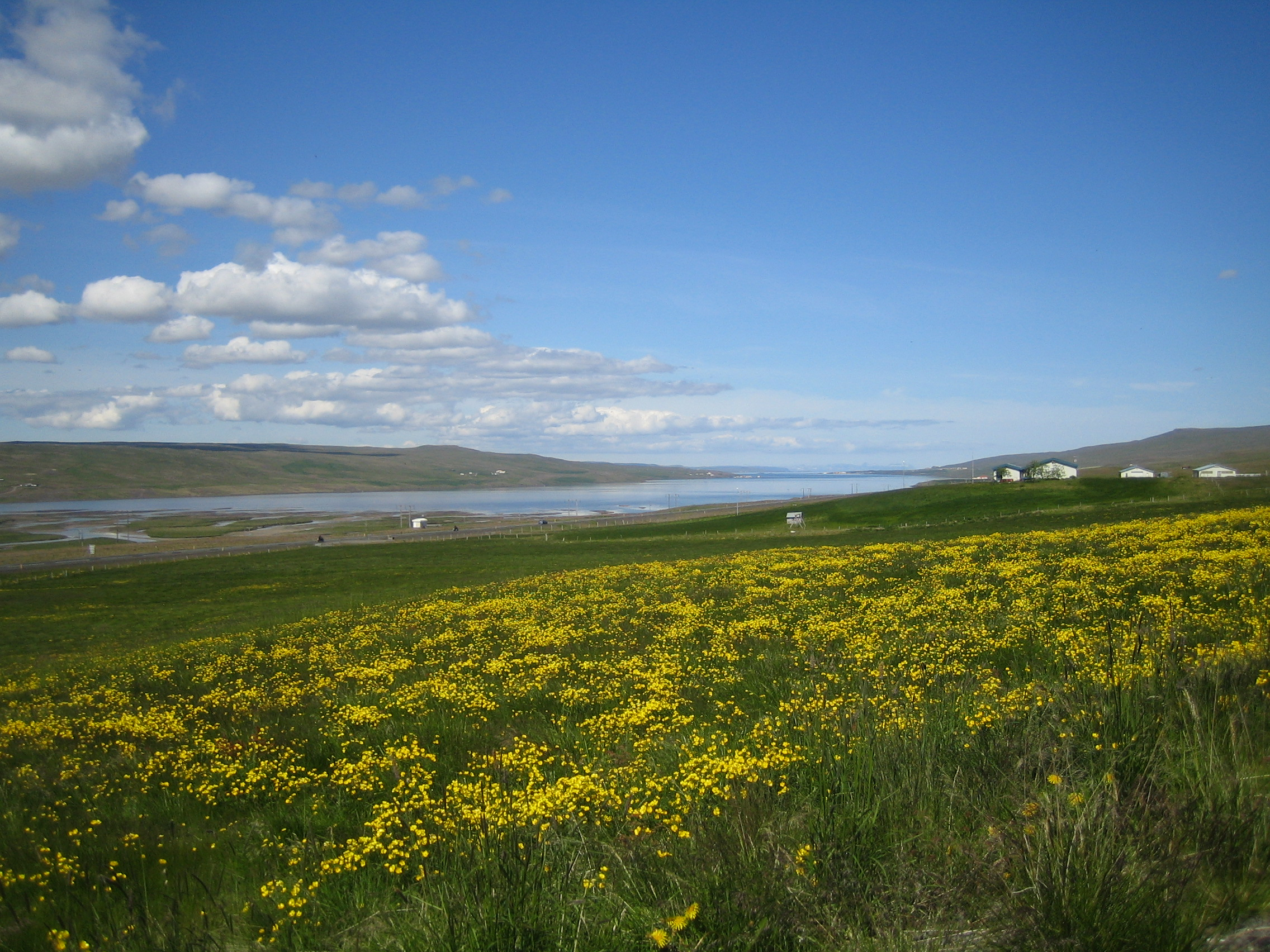
Hrútafjörður

== See also ==
- Media related to Hrútafjörður at Wikimedia Commons
