= Miðfjörður =

Fjord in north west Iceland

Coordinates: 65.398°N 20.981°W

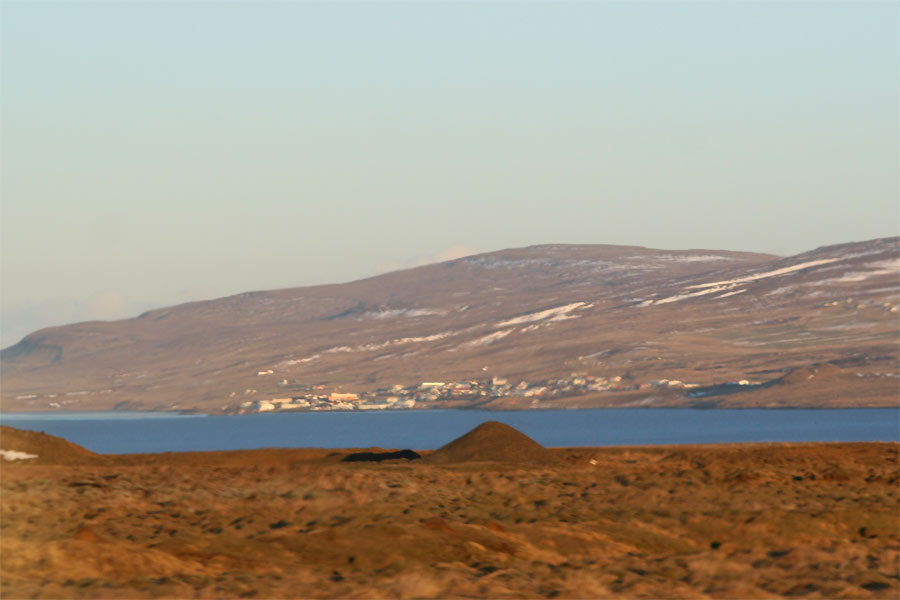
North across Miðfjörður to Hvammstangi

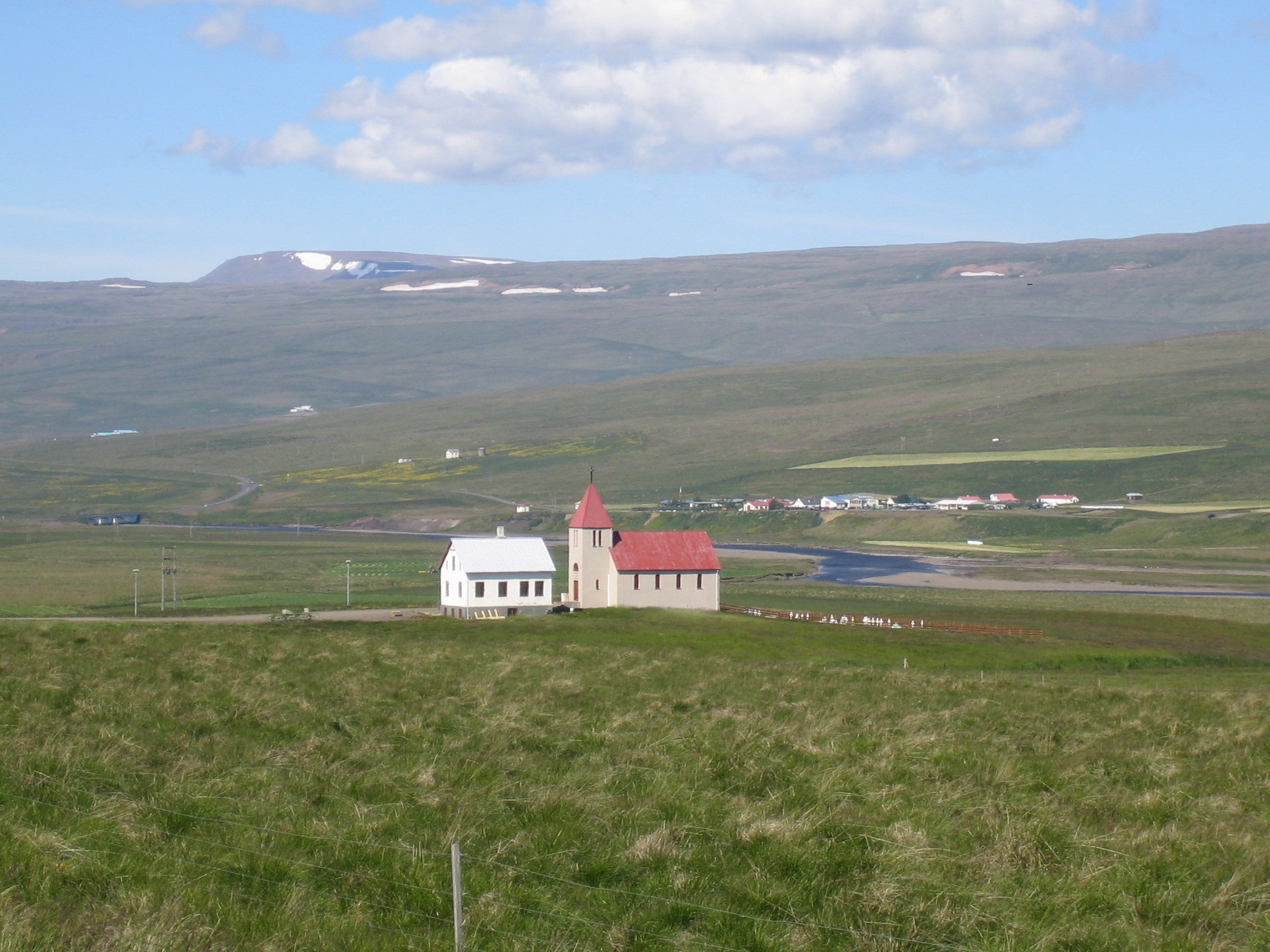
Melstaðarkirkja in Miðjförður

Miðfjörður (Icelandic pronunciation: [ˈmɪðˌfjœrðʏr̥]) is a small fjord as well as a conjoined valley in the northwest of Iceland.

The fjord has a length of 14 km and a width of up to 3,5 km. The valley is about 20 km long.

Miðfjörður is fed by the river Miðfjarðará [ˈmɪðˌfjarðarˌauː] and empties onto Húnaflói bay. The town of Hvammstangi is located at the eastern side of the fjord.

The main highway through rural Iceland, Route 1, passes by the southern tip of Miðfjörður.

== See also ==
- Fjords of Iceland
