= Þorvaldur Skúlason =

Icelandic painter (1906–1984)

Þorvaldur Skúlason (April 30, 1906 – August 30, 1984) was an Icelandic painter. He was one of the pioneers of abstract art in Iceland. He was influenced by French Cubism, which he met in France in the 1940s.

== Life ==
He was born in Borðeyri.
