= 2025 Strømsgodset Toppfotball season =

Strømsgodset
2025 season
- Chairman: Finn Egil Holm
- Manager: Jørgen Isnes
- Eliteserien: 15th (relegated)
- 2025 Norwegian Cup: Second round
- 2025–26 Norwegian Cup: Third round
- Top goalscorer: League: Fredrik Ardraa (1); All: Fredrik Ardraa (1)
- Highest home attendance: 8,332
- Average home league attendance: 5,269
Home colours	Away colours
- All statistics correct as of 10 April 2025.

The 2025 season is the 118th season in the history of Strømsgodset and their 19th consecutive season in the top flight of Norwegian football. The club will compete in the Eliteserien and the Norwegian Football Cup. The team representing Drammen was eliminated from the second round of the national cup following a defeat in a penalty shootout.

== Transfers ==
=== In ===
Pos.	Player	Transferred from	Fee	Date	Source
GK	(Norway) Eirik Johansen	(Norway) Brann	Free	14 February 2025	

=== Out ===
Pos.	Player	Transferred to	Fee	Date	Source
MF	(Ghana) Emmanuel Danso	(Norway) Stabæk	End of contract	1 January 2025	

== Friendlies ==
=== Pre-season ===
24 January 2025 Friendly	HamKam (Norway)	0–2	(Norway) Strømsgodset

7 February 2025 Friendly	Stabæk (Norway)	1–4	(Norway) Strømsgodset	Bekkestua
13:00				Stadium: Nadderud Stadion

21 February 2025 Friendly	Strømsgodset (Norway)	1–2	(Norway) Brann
18:00

26 February 2025 Friendly	Kristiansund (Norway)	2–1	(Norway) Strømsgodset
17:00

7 March 2025 Friendly	Vålerenga (Norway)	0–1	(Norway) Strømsgodset
12:00			Melkersen 83'

15 March 2025 Friendly	Fredrikstad (Norway)	1–2	(Norway) Strømsgodset
14:00	Rafn 72'		Mehnert 14'; Therkelsen 39'

22 March 2025 Friendly	Strømsgodset (Norway)	2–1	(Norway) KFUM
15:30

== Competitions ==
=== Overview ===
Competition	First match	Last match	Starting round	Final position	Record							
Competition	First match	Last match	Starting round	Final position	Pld	W	D	L	GF	GA	GD	Win %
Eliteserien	29 March 2025	30 November 2025	Matchday 1		7	2	0	5	12	12	+0	28.57
Norwegian Football Cup	13 April 2025	24 April 2025	First round	Second round	2	1	1	0	6	1	+5	50.00
Total					9	3	1	5	18	13	+5	33.33

Last updated: 11 May 2025
Source: Competitions

=== Eliteserien ===
==== League table ====
Pos	Team	Pld	W	D	L	GF	GA	GD	Pts	Qualification or relegation
12	KFUM Oslo	30	8	11	11	42	41	+1	35	
13	Kristiansund	30	9	7	14	34	59	−25	34	
14	Bryne (R)	30	8	7	15	37	56	−19	31	Qualification for the relegation play-offs
15	Strømsgodset (R)	30	6	2	22	37	72	−35	20	Relegation to First Division
16	Haugesund (R)	30	2	3	25	22	80	−58	9	Relegation to First Division

Source: Football Association of Norway (in Norwegian)
Rules for classification: 1) Points; 2) Goal difference; 3) Goals scored; 4) Head-to-head points; 5) Head-to-head goal difference; 6) Head-to-head goals scored.
(R) Relegated

==== Results summary ====
Overall								Home						Away					
Pld	W	D	L	GF	GA	GD	Pts	W	D	L	GF	GA	GD	W	D	L	GF	GA	GD
7	2	0	5	12	12	0	6	0	0	4	3	8	−5	2	0	1	9	4	+5

Last updated: 11 May 2025.

==== Results by round ====
Round	1	2	3	4
Ground	H	A	H	A
Result	L	W	L	W
Position	9			

Updated to match(es) played on 27 April 2025. Source:
A = Away; H = Home; W = Win; D = Draw; L = Loss

==== Matches ====
The match schedule was announced on 20 December 2024.

29 March 2025 1	Strømsgodset	1–2	Rosenborg	Drammen
16:00 UTC+1	Tómasson (yellow card) 51'; Ardraa (yellow card) 79' (goal) 90'; Valsvik (yellow card) 90+6'; Farji (yellow card) 90+10'; Therkelsen (yellow card) 90+10'	Report	Islamović (yellow card) 28'; Fossum 39'; E Ceïde 49'; Broholm (yellow card) 68'; Sæter (yellow card) 90+2'; M Ceïde (yellow card) 90+10'; Dahl Reitan (yellow card) 90+10'	Stadium: Marienlyst Stadion; Attendance: 8,332; Referee: Marius Hansen Grøtta

6 April 2025 2	Haugesund	0–5	Strømsgodset	Haugesund
17:00 UTC+2	Dia (yellow card) 78'	Report	Therkelsen 15'; Krasniqi 25'; Tómasson (yellow card) 33'; Farji 48', 90+2'; Melkersen (yellow card) 70'; Möller 79' (pen.)	Stadium: Haugesund Sparebank Arena; Attendance: 6,066; Referee: Svein Tore Sinnes

10 April 2025 17	Brann	2–1	Strømsgodset	Bergen
19:00 UTC+2	Castro 45+3' (pen.); De Roeve (yellow card) 65'; Horn Myhre 70'; Soltvedt (yellow card) 74'	Report	Dahl (yellow card) 44'; Farji 50'	Stadium: Brann Stadion; Attendance: 14,606; Referee: Sigurd Smehus Kringstad

21 April 2025 3	Strømsgodset	1–2	Brann	Drammen
17:00 UTC+2	Farji 32'; Krasniqi (yellow card) 83'; Bråtveit (yellow card) 85'	Report	Knudsen (yellow card) 69'; Kornvig 77'; Heggebø 90+5'	Stadium: Marienlyst Stadion; Attendance: 6,507; Referee: Christian Moen

27 April 2025 4	Sarpsborg 08	2–3	Strømsgodset	Sarpsborg
17:15 UTC+2	Karlsbakk 88'; Gudjohnsen 90'	Report	Farji 19'; Dahl 51'; Taaje 86'	Stadium: Sarpsborg Stadion; Attendance: 4,435; Referee: Tore Hansen

4 May 2025 5	Strømsgodset	1–2	Kristiansund	Drammen
17:00 UTC+2	Tómasson 5'; Mehnert (yellow card) 47'; Taaje (yellow card) 64'; Sørmo (yellow card) 86'	Report	Alte 55' (yellow card) 84'; Ndour 87' (pen.); Sæther (yellow card) 90+1'; Hoffmann (yellow card) 90+2'	Stadium: Marienlyst Stadion; Attendance: 4,308; Referee: Daniel Higraff

16 May 2025 7	Strømsgodset	0–2	Bryne	Drammen
18:00 UTC+2		Report	Bojadzic 6'; de Boer (yellow card) 43'; Tómasson 69' (o.g.); Görlich (yellow card) 81'	Stadium: Marienlyst Stadion; Attendance: 5,116; Referee: Espen Eskås

25 May 2025 8	Sandefjord	3–2	Strømsgodset	Sandefjord
18:00 UTC+2	Patoulidis 17'; Tibell 45+1' (yellow card) 64'; Dunsby 49'; Mørk (yellow card) 68'	Report	Stengel 52'; Therkelsen 61'	Stadium: Jotun Arena; Attendance: 3,478; Referee: Stian Røvig Sletner

31 May 2025 9	Strømsgodset	0–3	HamKam	Drammen
16:00 UTC+2	Farji (yellow card) 41'	Report	Mawa 7', 73'; Simenstad (yellow card) 36'; Roaldsøy (yellow card) 57'; Ekeroth (yellow card) 64'; Sørås 71'	Stadium: Marienlyst Stadion; Attendance: 4,360; Referee: Mathias Støfringshaug

22 June 2025 10	KFUM Oslo	5–0	Strømsgodset	Oslo
17:00 UTC+2	Sandal (yellow card) 35'; Gyedu 53'; Okeke 59', 82', (yellow card) 83'; Hjort 69'; Haltvik 90+2'	Report	Krasniqi (yellow card) 35'; Enersen (yellow card) 76'; Valsvik (yellow card) 89'	Stadium: KFUM Arena; Attendance: 1,927; Referee: Christian Moen

29 June 2025 11	Strømsgodset	0–2	Vålerenga	Drammen
19:15 UTC+2		Report	Rijks 39'; Strand 46'	Stadium: Marienlyst Stadion; Attendance: 6,521; Referee: Marius Hansen Grøtta

5 July 2025 12	Viking	1–0	Strømsgodset	Stavanger
16:00 UTC+2	Hansen 38'	Report		Stadium: SR-Bank Arena; Attendance: 13,363; Referee: Sivert Øksnes Amland

13 July 2025 13	Strømsgodset	2–3	Tromsø	Drammen
17:00 UTC+2	Taaje 43'; Farji (yellow card) 45+4' (goal) 68'	Report	Norheim 10', 15'; Cornic 90+6'	Stadium: Marienlyst Stadion; Attendance: 4,954; Referee: Stian Røvig Sletner

19 July 2025 14	Molde	4–1	Strømsgodset	Molde
16:00 UTC+2	Sery 11'; Gulbrandsen 20'; Kaasa 41', 51'; Kabini (yellow card) 86'; Breivik (yellow card) 89'	Report	Wikheim 37'	Stadium: Aker Stadion; Attendance: 7,266; Referee: Svein Tore Sinnes

25 July 2025 15	Fredrikstad	3–2	Strømsgodset	Fredrikstad
19:00 UTC+2	Conteh 14' (o.g.); Sørløkk 45+4'; Woledzi (yellow card) 78'; Holten 88'	Report	Bakke 39' (yellow card) 45'; Krasniqi 74'	Stadium: Fredrikstad Stadion; Attendance: 8,545; Referee: Sigurd Smehus Kringstad

30 July 2025 6	Bodø/Glimt	1–0	Strømsgodset	Bodø
19:00 UTC+2	Evjen 13'	Report	Ampofo (yellow card) 80'	Stadium: Aspmyra Stadion; Attendance: 7,340; Referee: Tore Hansen

3 August 2025 16	Strømsgodset	2–0	Haugesund	Drammen
19:00 UTC+2	Stengel 31'; Bakke (yellow card) 42'; Vilsvik 76'	Report		Stadium: Marienlyst Stadion; Attendance: 5,325; Referee: Christian Moen

15 August 2025 18	Strømsgodset	0–5	Bodø/Glimt	Drammen
19:00 UTC+2	Taaje (yellow card) 36'; Wikheim (red card) 41'	Report	Høgh 10', 59'; Hauge 39'; Bjørkan 45'; Bassi 84'	Stadium: Marienlyst Stadion; Attendance: 6,302; Referee: Espen Eskås

24 August 2025 19	Bryne	2–2	Strømsgodset	Bryne
17:00 UTC+2	Haahr (yellow card) 38'; Scriven (yellow card) 66'; Qvigstad 67'; Larsen 72'	Report	Stengel 21'; Ardraa (yellow card) 39'; Conteh 53'	Stadium: Bryne Stadion; Attendance: 2,666; Referee: Stian Røvig Sletner

31 August 2025 20	Strømsgodset	3–1	Molde	Drammen
19:15 UTC+2	Taaje 2'; Bakke 4'; Ardraa (yellow card) 52'; Farji 69'	Report	Roaldsøy (yellow card) 24'; Breivik (yellow card) 44'; Gulbrandsen (yellow card) 51'; Stenevik (yellow card) 52'; Daga 85'	Stadium: Marienlyst Stadion; Attendance: 4,243; Referee: Daniel Higraff

14 September 2025 21	HamKam	1–2	Strømsgodset	Hamar
14:30 UTC+2	Gonstad 8'; Mares (yellow card) 65'	Report	Ardraa (yellow card) 28'; Vilsvik 59'; Valsvik 83'	Stadium: Briskeby Stadion; Attendance: 4,611; Referee: Ola Hobber Nilsen

21 September 2025 22	Strømsgodset	2–1	Sarpsborg 08	Drammen
17:00 UTC+2	Conteh 10'; Vilsvik (yellow card) 38'; Valsvik 60'	Report	Taaje 33' (o.g.); Utvik (yellow card) 48'; Reinhardsen (yellow card) 78'	Stadium: Marienlyst Stadion; Attendance: 4,876; Referee: Marius Hansen Grøtta

28 September 2025 23	Tromsø	3–1	Strømsgodset	Tromsø
17:00 UTC+2	Camões 16', 45+2' (yellow card) 17'; Edvardsson (yellow card) 41'; Warneryd 49'; Kinteh (yellow card) 54'	Report	Enersen 13'; Vilsvik (yellow card) 55'	Stadium: Romssa Arena; Attendance: 4,068; Referee: Christian Moen

5 October 2025 24	Strømsgodset	1–1	KFUM Oslo	Drammen
17:00 UTC+2	Bakke (yellow card) 75'; Dahl 90+5'	Report	M. Njie (yellow card) 68'; Ndiaye (yellow card) 83'; Hestnes (yellow card) 87'; Kristensen 90+1'	Stadium: Marienlyst Stadion; Attendance: 3,852; Referee: Sivert Øksnes Amland

19 October 2025 25	Strømsgodset	0–3	Fredrikstad	Drammen
19:15 CEST (UTC+2)		Report	Skogvold (yellow card) 64' (goal) 77'; Øhlenschlæger 67'; Fredriksen 70'	Stadium: Marienlyst Stadion; Attendance: 4,389; Referee: Daniel Higraff

26 October 2025 26	Vålerenga	2–1	Strømsgodset	Oslo
19:15 UTC+1	Hagen 90+1'; Kiil Olsen 90+7'	Report	Taaje 29' (yellow card) 41'; Bakke (yellow card) 45+2'; Valsvik (yellow card) 69'	Stadium: Intility Arena; Attendance: 8,076; Referee: Marius Hansen Grøtta

2 November 2025 27	Strømsgodset	1–2	Viking	Drammen
14:30 UTC+1	Mehnert 13' (yellow card) 89'; Farji (yellow card) 30'	Report	Christiansen 38'; Stengel 45+2' (o.g.); Heggheim (yellow card) 45+5'; Aarsheim (yellow card) 90+3'	Stadium: Marienlyst Stadion; Attendance: 6,052; Referee: Marius Lien

9 November 2025 28	Kristiansund	2–1	Strømsgodset	Kristiansund
17:00 UTC+1	Alvheim 29' (pen.) (yellow card) 88'; Valsvik 46' (o.g.); Olsen (yellow card) 79'	Report	Taaje (yellow card) 28'; Ardraa 53'; Wikheim (yellow card) 88'	Stadium: Nordmøre Stadion; Attendance: 3,476; Referee: Sigurd Smehus Kringstad

22 November 2025 29	Strømsgodset	2–6	Sandefjord	Drammen
18:00 UTC+1	Farji (penalty missed) 9' 17', 49'; Ardraa (yellow card) 45'; Valsvik (yellow card) 57'	Report	Sigurdarson 1', 33'; Patoulidis 27'; Hanstad 71'; Pettersen 79'; Kristiansen 81'	Stadium: Marienlyst Stadion; Attendance: 3,909; Referee: Marius Hansen Grøtta

30 November 2025 30	Rosenborg	6–0	Strømsgodset	Trondheim
17:00 UTC+1	Bolkan Nordli 33', 60'; Ďuriš 37', 55'; Islamović 67'; Ceïde 90+5'	Report	Farji (yellow card) 41'; Taaje (yellow card) 59'	Stadium: Lerkendal Stadion; Attendance: 10,434; Referee: Daniel Higraff

=== Norwegian Football Cup ===
==== 2025 ====
13 April 2025 First round	Konnerud	0–5	Strømsgodset	Konnerud
16:00 UTC+2		Report	Ardraa 5'; Farji 20', 28'; Melkersen 30'; Tómasson (yellow card) 49'; Westerlund (yellow card) 87'; Möller 89'	Stadium: Konnerud kunstgress Referee: Magnus Nicolai Koløy

24 April 2025 Second round	Mjøndalen	1–1 (a.e.t.) (4–3 p)	Strømsgodset	Mjøndalen
19:20 UTC+2	Bruusgaard (yellow card) 48'; Conteh 57'; Øy (yellow card) 71'; Sawaneh (yellow card) 72'; Skaar Eriksen (yellow card) 90+3'	Report; Penalties	Valsvik 70' (pen.); Farji (yellow card) 72'; Ardraa (yellow card) 94'	Stadium: Consto Arena; Attendance: 3,332; Referee: Eivind Bodding
	Penalties
	Conteh (penalty scored); Skaar Eriksen (penalty scored); Singh (penalty scored); Sawaneh (penalty scored)		(penalty scored) Sørby Stengel; (penalty missed) Krasniqi; (penalty scored) Tómasson; (penalty scored) Johansen Mehnert
Note: The match, which was initially set to commence at 19:05, was delayed as a number of players were stuck in traffic.

==== 2025–26 ====
24 September 2025 Third round	Strømsgodset	1–1 (a.e.t.) (3–5 p)	Molde	Drammen
18:00 UTC+2	Ampofo (yellow card) 45+1'; Wikheim 55'; Conteh (yellow card) 58'; Enersen (yellow card) 120'	Report; Penalties	Breivik (yellow card) 25'; Abdullai 36' (yellow card) 64'; Daga (yellow card) 40'; Gulbrandsen (yellow card) 90'; Kasanwirjo (yellow card) 101'	Stadium: Marienlyst Stadion; Attendance: 1,312; Referee: Kristoffer Hagenes
	Penalties
	Stengel (penalty scored); Vilsvik (penalty scored); Valsvik (penalty missed); Farji (penalty scored)		(penalty scored) Gulbrandsen; (penalty scored) Eikrem; (penalty scored) Hestad; (penalty scored) Roaldsøy; (penalty scored) Breivik
