= 2024 Strømsgodset Toppfotball season =

Strømsgodset
2024 season
- Chairman: Ann Sire Fjerdingstad
- Manager: Jørgen Isnes
- Stadium: Marienlyst Stadion
- Eliteserien: 7th
- Norwegian Cup: Fourth round
- Top goalscorer: League: Elias Melkersen (6); All: Elias Melkersen (7)
- Average home league attendance: 6,206
Home colours	Away colours
- All statistics correct as of 29 February 2024.

The 2024 season is Strømsgodset Toppfotball's 117th season in existence and the club's 12th consecutive season in the top flight of Norwegian football. In addition to the domestic league, Strømsgodset Toppfotball participating in this season's edition of the Norwegian Football Cup.

== Players ==
=== First team squad ===
As of 22 July 2023

Note: Flags indicate national team as defined under FIFA eligibility rules; some limited exceptions apply. Players may hold more than one non-FIFA nationality.

No.	Pos.	Nation	Player
1	GK	NOR	Per Kristian Bråtveit
3	DF	NOR	Sondre Fosnæss Hanssen
4	DF	NOR	Sivert Westerlund
5	DF	NOR	Bent Sørmo
8	MF	KOS	Kreshnik Krasniqi
9	FW	NOR	Elias Melkersen
10	MF	NOR	Herman Stengel (vice-captain)
11	FW	NOR	Jostein Ekeland
14	MF	NOR	Ole Enersen
15	MF	NOR	Andreas Heredia-Randen
16	DF	GAM	Dadi Gaye (on loan from Tromsø)
17	DF	ISL	Logi Tómasson
18	DF	GHA	Ernest Boahene

No.	Pos.	Nation	Player
19	FW	NOR	Chrisander Sørum
20	MF	GHA	Emmanuel Danso
21	MF	IRQ	Marko Farji
22	MF	NOR	Jonas Therkelsen
23	MF	NOR	Eirik Ulland Andersen
25	DF	NOR	Jesper Taaje
26	DF	NOR	Lars-Christopher Vilsvik
27	DF	NOR	Fredrik Kristensen Dahl
30	DF	NOR	Fabian Holst-Larsen
32	GK	NOR	Frank Stople
71	DF	NOR	Gustav Valsvik (captain)
77	FW	NOR	Marcus Mehnert

== Transfers ==
=== Winter ===
In: Note: Flags indicate national team as defined under FIFA eligibility rules; some limited exceptions apply. Players may hold more than one non-FIFA nationality.

No.	Pos.	Nation	Player
1	GK	NOR	Per Kristian Bråtveit (from Odd)
4	DF	NOR	Sivert Westerlund (from Raufoss)
9	FW	NOR	Elias Hoff Melkersen (from (Scotland) Hibs, previously on loan)
16	DF	GAM	Dadi Gaye (on loan from Tromsø)
25	DF	NOR	Jesper Taaje (from Sandefjord)
32	GK	NOR	Frank Stople (from Haugesund)

Out: Note: Flags indicate national team as defined under FIFA eligibility rules; some limited exceptions apply. Players may hold more than one non-FIFA nationality.

No.	Pos.	Nation	Player
1	GK	NOR	Viljar Myhra (to (Denmark) OB)
2	DF	ISL	Ari Leifsson (to (Denmark) Kolding)
4	DF	NOR	Thomas Grøgaard (to Aalesund)
7	MF	NOR	Halldor Stenevik (to Molde)
28	DF	NOR	Eirik Espelid Blikstad (to Hødd)
—	GK	NOR	Morten Sætra (to Levanger)

== Competitions ==
=== Overview ===
Competition	First match	Last match	Starting round	Final position	Record							
Competition	First match	Last match	Starting round	Final position	Pld	W	D	L	GF	GA	GD	Win %
Eliteserien	1 April 2024	1 December 2024	Matchday 1	7th	30	10	8	12	32	40	−8	33.33
Norwegian Cup	10 April 2024	9 May 2024	First round	Fourth round	4	3	0	1	17	4	+13	75.00
Total					34	13	8	13	49	44	+5	38.24

Last updated: 1 December 2024
Source: Soccerway

=== Eliteserien ===
==== League table ====
Pos	Team	Pld	W	D	L	GF	GA	GD	Pts	Qualification or relegation
5	Molde	30	15	7	8	64	36	+28	52	
6	Fredrikstad	30	14	9	7	39	35	+4	51	Qualification for the Europa League third qualifying round (Note: Fredrikstad qualified for the Europa League third qualifying round by winning the 2024 Norwegian Football Cup.)
7	Strømsgodset	30	10	8	12	32	40	−8	38	
8	KFUM	30	9	10	11	35	36	−1	37	
9	Sarpsborg	30	10	7	13	43	55	−12	37	

Source: Football Association of Norway (in Norwegian)
Rules for classification: 1) Points; 2) Goal difference; 3) Goals scored; 4) Head-to-head points; 5) Head-to-head goal difference; 6) Head-to-head goals scored.

==== Results summary ====
Overall								Home						Away					
Pld	W	D	L	GF	GA	GD	Pts	W	D	L	GF	GA	GD	W	D	L	GF	GA	GD
30	10	8	12	32	40	−8	38	7	4	4	19	14	+5	3	4	8	13	26	−13

Last updated: 1 December 2024.

==== Results by round ====
Round	1	2	3	4	5	6	7	8	9	10	11	12	13	14	15	16	17	18	19	20	21	22	23	24	25	26	27	28	29	30
Ground	A	H	A	A	H	A	H	A	H	A	H	A	H	A	H	A	H	A	H	A	H	A	H	H	A	H	A	H	A	H
Result	L	W	W	W	D	L	L	L	W	W	D	D	D	L	L	L	L	D	W	L	L	D	W	D	D	W	L	W	L	W
Position	16	12	5	4	3	5	7	10	7	6	6	6	6	6	9	10	11	11	10	11	12	12	11	11	11	9	9	7	7	7

A = Away; H = Home; W = Win; D = Draw; L = Loss

==== Matches ====
The league fixtures were announced on 20 December 2023.

1 April 2024 1	Molde	4–0	Strømsgodset	Molde
17:00 CEST (UTC+2)	Hestad 25'; Kaasa 51'; Amundsen (yellow card) 60'; Hagelskjær (yellow card) 63'; Eriksen 73'; Eikrem 90+1'	Report	E. U. Andersen (yellow card) 50'	Stadium: Aker Stadion; Attendance: 7,203; Referee: Espen Eskås

7 April 2024 2	Strømsgodset	1–0	Rosenborg	Drammen
17:00 CEST (UTC+2)	Tómasson 62'; Vilsvik (yellow card) 66'	Report	Henriksen (yellow card) 88'	Stadium: Marienlyst Stadion; Attendance: 6,206; Referee: Daniel Higraff

16 April 2024 3	KFUM Oslo	1–3	Strømsgodset	Oslo
19:00 CEST (UTC+2)	Hestnes 66'	Report	E. U. Andersen 7'; Krasniqi (yellow card) 39'; Stengel 42', 85'	Stadium: Intility Arena; Attendance: 2,943; Referee: Svein Tore Sinnes
Note: The match was played on Intility Arena due to the KFUM's home stadium KFUM Arena's undergoing renovation.

21 April 2024 4	HamKam	0–1	Strømsgodset	Hamar
14:30 CEST (UTC+2)		Report	Taaje 43'; Melkersen (yellow card) 64'	Stadium: Briskeby Stadion; Attendance: 3,108; Referee: Kristoffer Hagenes

28 April 2024 5	Strømsgodset	2–2	Kristiansund	Drammen
17:00 CEST (UTC+2)	Farji (yellow card) 45'; Valsvik 71'; Melkersen 78'	Report	Sivertsen 22' (pen.); Willumsson 40'; Jarl (yellow card) 53'; Olsen (yellow card) 59'; Guèye (yellow card) 70'	Stadium: Marienlyst Stadion; Attendance: 4,279; Referee: Ola Hobber Nilsen

5 May 2024 6	Bodø/Glimt	1–0	Strømsgodset	Bodø
17:00 CEST (UTC+2)	Evjen 74'	Report	Dahl (yellow card) 24'; Farji (yellow card) 45'	Stadium: Aspmyra Stadion; Attendance: 5,961; Referee: Sivert Øksnes Amland

12 May 2024 7	Strømsgodset	0–1	Viking	Drammen
17:00 CEST (UTC+2)	Westerlund (yellow card) 79'; Farji (yellow card) 90'; E. U. Andersen (yellow card) 90+7'	Report	Salvesen 53'; Auklend (yellow card) 90+3'	Stadium: Marienlyst Stadion; Attendance: 4,669; Referee: Svein Tore Sinnes

16 May 2024 8	Fredrikstad	4–1	Strømsgodset	Fredrikstad
18:00 CEST (UTC+2)	Molde 4'; E. U. Andersen 14' (o.g.); Bjørlo 41' (pen.); Aga 66'; Fischer (yellow card) 81'	Report	Aukland 8' (o.g.): Krasniqi (yellow card) 64'	Stadium: Fredrikstad Stadion; Attendance: 11,317; Referee: Daniel Higraff

20 May 2024 9	Strømsgodset	2–0	Haugesund	Drammen
17:00 CEST (UTC+2)	Bærtelsen 45+1' (o.g.); Melkersen 53'	Report		Stadium: Marienlyst Stadion; Attendance: 5,346; Referee: Espen Eskås

26 May 2024 10	Sarpsborg 08	1–3	Strømsgodset	Sarpsborg
17:00 CEST (UTC+2)	Ørjasæter (yellow card) 45+1'; Reinhardsen 72'; J. Andersen (yellow card) 85'	Report	Therkelsen 36', 63' (yellow card) 57'; Valsvik 89'	Stadium: Sarpsborg Stadion; Attendance: 4,105; Referee: Kristoffer Hagenes

2 June 2024 11	Strømsgodset	1–1	Odd	Drammen
17:00 CEST (UTC+2)	Melkersen 15'; Taaje (yellow card) 36'	Report	Tewelde 54'; Miettinen (yellow card) 55'	Stadium: Marienlyst Stadion; Attendance: 5,381; Referee: Steinar Hauge

28 June 2024 12	Brann	0–0	Strømsgodset	Bergen
19:00 CEST (UTC+2)	Kristiansen (yellow card) 76'	Report	Ekeland (yellow card) 87'	Stadium: Brann Stadion; Attendance: 15,933; Referee: Sigurd Smehus Kringstad

8 July 2024 13	Strømsgodset	1–1	Sandefjord	Drammen
19:00 CEST (UTC+2)	Taaje (yellow card) 30'; Tómasson 42'; Stengel (yellow card) 49'	Report	Mettler 45+1'; Ottosson (yellow card) 58'; Egeli (yellow card) 58'	Stadium: Marienlyst Stadion; Attendance: 4,871; Referee: Christian Moen

13 July 2024 14	Lillestrøm	3–1	Strømsgodset	Lillestrøm
17:00 CEST (UTC+2)	Lehne Olsen 15' (pen.); Kitolano 17'; Lundemo 47'; Vá (yellow card) 64'; Røssing-Lelesiit (yellow card) 90+2'	Report	Tómasson (yellow card) 24' (goal) 32'; Mehnert (yellow card) 39'	Stadium: Åråsen Stadion; Attendance: 5,918; Referee: Espen Eskås

21 July 2024 15	Strømsgodset	0–1	Tromsø	Drammen
14:30 CEST (UTC+2)	Tómasson (yellow card) 59'	Report	Nordås 49'; Barry (yellow card) 57'; Grøntvedt Jenssen (yellow card) 81'; Yttergård Jenssen (yellow card) 85'	Stadium: Marienlyst Stadion; Attendance: 4,607; Referee: Kristoffer Hagenes

28 July 2024 16	Odd	2–0	Strømsgodset	Skien
17:00 CEST (UTC+2)	Ingebrigtsen (yellow card) 31'; Jørgensen 38'; Svendsen 43'; Ruud (yellow card) 90+1'	Report	Danso (yellow card) 40'; Therkelsen (yellow card) 79'; Sørmo (yellow card) 90+5'	Stadium: Skagerak Arena; Attendance: 3,781; Referee: Sivert Øksnes Amland

4 August 2024 17	Strømsgodset	2–3	Brann	Drammen
17:00 CEST (UTC+2)	Tómasson 38'; Dahl (yellow card) 65'; Ardraa 90+2'; Melkersen (yellow card) 90+3'	Report	Finne 20'; Valsvik 22'; Kartum 63'	Stadium: Marienlyst Stadion; Attendance: 5,601; Referee: Tore Hansen

9 August 2024 18	Sandefjord	2–2	Strømsgodset	Sandefjord
19:00 CEST (UTC+2)	Amin (yellow card) 51'; Valsvik 66' (o.g.); Sigurðarson 75'	Report	E. U. Andersen 5'; Stengel 47'; Vilsvik (yellow card) 80'; Danso (yellow card) 89'	Stadium: Jotun Arena; Attendance: 6,598; Referee: Svein Tore Sinnes

17 August 2024 19	Strømsgodset	3–2	Lillestrøm	Drammen
18:00 CEST (UTC+2)	Melkersen 6', 90+4'; Möller 72' (yellow card) 73'; Mehnert (yellow card) 80'	Report	Gabrielsen 5'; Hagerup (yellow card) 7'; Tønnessen (yellow card) 35'; Lehne Olsen 37' (pen.); Ibrahimaj (yellow card) 55'	Stadium: Marienlyst Stadion; Attendance: 5,006; Referee: Marius Lien

25 August 2024 20	Viking	5–2	Strømsgodset	Stavanger
17:00 CEST (UTC+2)	Tripić 6', 36' (pen.); Salvesen 59' Svendsen 61'; Stensness 82'; Urbančič (yellow card) 84'	Report	Taaje (yellow card) 8'; Danso (yellow card) 15'; Melkersen 29'; Therkelsen (yellow card) 69' (goal) 74'; Vilsvik (yellow card) 69'; Stengel (yellow card) 81'	Stadium: SR-Bank Arena; Attendance: 10,211; Referee: Marius Hansen Grøtta

1 September 2024 21	Strømsgodset	0–1	Bodø/Glimt	Drammen
17:00 CEST (UTC+2)	Therkelsen (yellow card) 90'	Report	Haikin (yellow card) 44'; Fet 52'	Stadium: Marienlyst Stadion; Attendance: 5,380; Referee: Christian Moen

15 September 2024 22	Haugesund	0–0	Strømsgodset	Haugesund
17:00 CEST (UTC+2)	Bærtelsen (yellow card) 53'; Bizoza (yellow card) 74'; Nyhammer (yellow card) 87'	Report	Farji (yellow card) 85'	Stadium: Haugesund Sparebank Arena; Attendance: 3,761; Referee: Kristoffer Hagenes

21 September 2024 23	Strømsgodset	2–1	Sarpsborg 08	Drammen
16:00 CEST (UTC+2)	Therkelsen 6'; Stengel 27' (pen.) (yellow card) 79'; Möller (yellow card) 49'; Valsvik (yellow card) 69'	Report	Sandberg (yellow card) 25'; Johansen (yellow card) 30'; Reinhardsen 31'; Koch (yellow card) 54'	Stadium: Marienlyst Stadion; Attendance: 5,039; Referee: Marius Hansen Grøtta

29 September 2024 24	Strømsgodset	1–1	HamKam	Drammen
14:30 CEST (UTC+2)	Taaje (yellow card) 28'; Ulland Andersen 36'	Report	Bjarnason (yellow card) 53'; Strand Nilsen 88'	Stadium: Marienlyst Stadion; Attendance: 4,507; Referee: Espen Eskås

20 October 2024 25	Kristiansund	0–0	Strømsgodset	Kristiansund
17:00 CEST (UTC+2)	Rakneberg (yellow card) 83'	Report	Krasniqi (yellow card) 76'	Stadium: Kristiansund Stadion; Attendance: 3,108; Referee: Marius Lien

26 October 2024 26	Strømsgodset	2–0	Fredrikstad	Drammen
18:00 CEST (UTC+2)	Therkelsen 12'; Tómasson 55' (yellow card) 60'; Sørmo (yellow card) 77'; Bråtveit (yellow card) 88'	Report		Stadium: Marienlyst Stadion; Attendance: 4,604; Referee: Daniel Higraff

3 November 2024 27	Rosenborg	1–0	Strømsgodset	Trondheim
19:15 CET (UTC+1)	Pereira (yellow card) 38'; Nemčík (yellow card) 88'; Dahl Reitan 90+4'; Sandberg (yellow card) 90+5'	Report	Tómasson (yellow card) 86'	Stadium: Lerkendal Stadion; Attendance: 12,424; Referee: Tore Hansen

10 November 2024 28	Strømsgodset	1–0	KFUM Oslo	Drammen
17:00 CET (UTC+1)	Vilsvik (yellow card) 29'; Möller 58'	Report	Hoseth (yellow card) 85'	Stadium: Marienlyst Stadion; Attendance: 4,418; Referee: Svein Tore Sinnes

23 November 2024 29	Tromsø	2–0	Strømsgodset	Tromsø
17:00 CET (UTC+1)	Romsaas 42'; Erlien 55'	Report	Therkelsen (yellow card) 50'; Silalahi (yellow card) 68'	Stadium: Romssa Arena; Attendance: 3,991; Referee: Sivert Øksnes Amland

1 December 2024 30	Strømsgodset	1–0	Molde	Drammen
17:00 CET (UTC+1)	Sørmo (yellow card) 48'; Möller 57'; Kristensen Dahl (yellow card) 90+1'; Silalahi (yellow card) 90+5'	Report		Stadium: Marienlyst Stadion; Attendance: 4,207; Referee: Marius Lien

=== Norwegian Football Cup ===
10 April 2024 First round	Hallingdal	0–7	Strømsgodset	Hallingdal
18:30 CEST (UTC+2)		Report	Melkersen 33'; Hanssen 41', 85'; Therkelsen 45+2'; Mehnert 52', 75'; Ardraa 54'	Stadium: Gol kunstgress Attendance: 1,197; Referee: Magnus Nicolai Koløy

24 April 2024 Second round	Jerv	0–3	Strømsgodset	Arendal
19:00 CEST (UTC+2)	Stanic (yellow card) 84'	Report	Westerlund 38'; Mehnert 41'; Melkersen (yellow card) 90+3'; Therkelsen 90+3'	Stadium: Norac Stadion; Attendance: 402; Referee: Aleksander Skjold Vermundsen

1 May 2024 Third round	Strømsgodset	4–0	Kristiansund	Drammen
16:00 CEST (UTC+2)	Krasniqi 25'; Stengel 41'; Therkelsen (yellow card) 40'; Tómasson 45+1'; Mehnert 82'	Report	Guèye (yellow card) 61'	Stadium: Marienlyst Stadion; Attendance: 2,098; Referee: Marius Lien

9 May 2024 Fourth round	Strømsgodset	3–4 (a.e.t.)	Lillestrøm	Drammen
18:00 CEST (UTC+2)	Taaje (yellow card) 31'; E. U. Andersen 36', 69'; Stengel 45+2' (pen.); Vilsvik (yellow card) 59'; Farji 73'	Report	Lundemo 21'; Kitolano 34'; Vá 45'; Ibrahimaj (yellow card) 74'; Åsen 117'	Stadium: Marienlyst Stadion; Attendance: 4,336; Referee: Sigurd Smehus Kringstad
