= 2022 Molde FK season =

Molde
2022 season
- Chairman: Odd Ivar Moen
- Manager: Erling Moe
- Stadium: Aker Stadion
- Eliteserien: 1st
- 2021 Norwegian Football Cup: Winners
- 2022 Norwegian Football Cup: Fourth round
- 2021–22 UEFA Europa Conference League: Group stage
- Top goalscorer: League: Datro Fofana (15); All: Datro Fofana (22)
- Highest home attendance: 10,755 vs HamKam (23 October)
- Lowest home attendance: 0 vs Odd (13 March)
- Average home league attendance: 5,432 (6 November)
Home colours	Away colours

The 2022 season was Molde's 15th consecutive year in Eliteserien, and their 46th season in the top flight of Norwegian football. Molde finished the season as Champions of the Eliteserien and the 2021 Norwegian Cup, progressed to the Fourth Round of the 2022 Norwegian Cup, and were knocked out of the Europa Conference League in the group stage after finishing 3rd behind Djurgården and Gent, but ahead of Shamrock Rovers.

== Season events ==
On 15 December 2021, Molde announced that Jacob Karlstrøm would join the club on 1 January 2022 on a contract until the end of the 2025 season from Tromsø.

On 17 January, Molde announced the signing of Markus Kaasa to a four-year contract from Odd.

On 24 January, Johan Bakke signed for Molde on a three-year contract from Sogndal.

On 2 February, Molde announced the signing of Benjamin Hansen to a three-year contract from Haugesund.

On 4 February, Molde extended their contract with Erling Moe until the end of 2023, and with Rafik Zekhnini until the end of 2024.

On 7 February, Molde announced return of Eirik Haugan on a one-year contract from Östersund.

On 2 August, Molde announced the signing of Kristian Eriksen on a contract until 2026, from HamKam.

On 13 September, Eirik Haugan extended his contract with Molde until the end of 2026.

On 7 October, Magnus Wolff Eikrem signed a new three year deal with the club, extending his contract with Molde until the end of 2025.

On 8 October, Mathias Løvik signed a new contract with Molde until the end of the 2026 season.

On 28 October, Kristoffer Haugen extended his contract with Molde until the end of 2025.

== Squad ==
As of match played 13 November 2022

No.	Name	Nationality	Position	Date of birth (age)	Signed from	Signed in	Contract ends	Apps.	Goals
Goalkeepers
1	Jacob Karlstrøm	(Norway)	GK	9 January 1997 (aged 25)	Tromsø	2022	2025	42	0
12	Álex Craninx	(Belgium)	GK	21 October 1995 (aged 27)	Cartagena	2018	2023	29	0
26	Oliver Petersen	(Norway)	GK	26 September 2001 (aged 21)	Follo	2019	2024	14	0
34	Peder Hoel Lervik	(Norway)	GK	24 April 2005 (aged 17)	Academy	2021		0	0
35	William Fraser	(Norway)	GK	26 January 2002 (aged 20)	Academy	2021		0	0
46	Magnus Thorvik	(Norway)	GK	16 May 2004 (aged 18)	Academy	2021		0	0
Defenders
2	Martin Bjørnbak	(Norway)	DF	22 March 1992 (aged 30)	Bodø/Glimt	2019	2025	111	4
3	Birk Risa	(Norway)	DF	13 February 1998 (aged 24)	Odd	2020	2023	78	3
4	Benjamin Hansen	(Denmark)	DF	7 February 1994 (aged 28)	Haugesund	2022	2024	42	0
5	Sheriff Sinyan	(The Gambia)	DF	19 July 1996 (aged 26)	Lillestrøm	2020	2023	58	3
18	Kristoffer Haraldseid	(Norway)	DF	17 January 1994 (aged 28)	Haugesund	2019	2022	36	1
19	Eirik Haugan	(Norway)	DF	27 August 1997 (aged 25)	Östersund	2022	2026	45	2
21	Martin Linnes	(Norway)	DF	20 September 1991 (aged 31)	Unattached	2021	2025	197	21
28	Kristoffer Haugen	(Norway)	DF	21 February 1994 (aged 28)	Viking	2018	2025	146	14
31	Mathias Løvik	(Norway)	DF	6 December 2003 (aged 18)	Academy	2021	2026	24	1
41	Sindre Heggstad	(Norway)	DF	6 April 2003 (aged 19)	Academy	2021		0	0
44	Filip Kristoffersen	(Norway)	DF	9 March 2004 (aged 18)	Academy	2021		0	0
47	Nikolai Skuseth	(Norway)	DF	18 May 2004 (aged 18)	Academy	2021		0	0
52	Fredrik Nyheim	(Norway)	DF	2 April 2005 (aged 17)	Academy	2021		0	0
53	Adrian Viken	(Norway)	DF	14 July 2005 (aged 17)	Academy	2021		0	0
58	Anders Børset	(Norway)	DF	22 February 2006 (aged 16)	Academy	2021		3	0
Midfielders
6	Martin Ellingsen	(Norway)	MF	2 May 1995 (aged 27)	Kongsvinger	2017	2022	94	17
7	Magnus Wolff Eikrem	(Norway)	MF	8 August 1990 (aged 32)	Seattle Sounders FC	2018	2025	244	55
8	Sivert Mannsverk	(Norway)	MF	8 May 2002 (aged 20)	Sogndal	2021	2025	62	5
11	Ola Brynhildsen	(Norway)	MF	27 April 1999 (aged 23)	Stabæk	2020	2024	110	31
15	Markus Kaasa	(Norway)	MF	15 July 1997 (aged 25)	Odd	2022	2025	40	11
16	Etzaz Hussain	(Norway)	MF	27 January 1993 (aged 29)	Rudeš	2017	2022	295	38
20	Kristian Eriksen	(Norway)	MF	18 July 1995 (aged 27)	HamKam	2022	2026	23	2
23	Eirik Andersen	(Norway)	MF	21 September 1992 (aged 30)	Strømsgodset	2019	2022	63	21
24	Johan Bakke	(Norway)	MF	1 April 2004 (aged 18)	Sogndal	2022	2024	10	0
25	Emil Breivik	(Norway)	MF	11 June 2000 (aged 22)	Academy	2014	2025	75	5
33	Niklas Ødegård	(Norway)	MF	29 March 2004 (aged 18)	Academy	2021		17	2
45	Leon-Robin Juberg-Hovland	(Norway)	MF	9 May 2004 (aged 18)	Academy	2021		1	0
48	Anton Solbakken	(Norway)	MF	26 June 2004 (aged 18)	Academy	2022		0	0
49	Nikolai Ohr	(Norway)	MF	22 November 2004 (aged 17)	Academy	2022		0	0
50	Vegard Myklebust	(Norway)	MF	2 February 2005 (aged 17)	Academy	2022		0	0
54	Andreas Myklebust	(Norway)	MF	16 July 2005 (aged 17)	Academy	2021		1	0
55	Emil Silseth	(Norway)	MF	15 September 2005 (aged 17)	Academy	2022		0	0
Forwards
9	Datro Fofana	(Ivory Coast)	FW	22 December 2002 (aged 19)	AFAD	2021	2024	65	24
10	Björn Sigurðarson	(Iceland)	FW	26 February 1991 (aged 31)	Lillestrøm	2021	2022	67	25
14	Erling Knudtzon	(Norway)	FW	15 December 1988 (aged 33)	Lillestrøm	2019	2023	144	10
17	Rafik Zekhnini	(Norway)	FW	12 January 1998 (aged 24)	Fiorentina	2021	2024	37	3
22	Magnus Grødem	(Norway)	FW	14 August 1998 (aged 24)	Sandnes Ulf	2021	2024	68	15
30	Mathis Bolly	(Ivory Coast)	FW	14 November 1990 (aged 31)	Free agent	2019	2022	67	6
40	Martin Kjørsvik	(Norway)	FW	17 January 2003 (aged 19)	Academy	2021		1	0
42	Jesper Myklebust	(Norway)	FW	5 June 2003 (aged 19)	Academy	2022		0	0
43	Dino Okanovic	(Norway)	FW	3 August 2003 (aged 19)	Academy	2022		0	0
51	Magnus Solheim	(Norway)	FW	3 March 2005 (aged 17)	Academy	2022		0	0
52	Albert Tjåland	(Norway)	FW	11 February 2004 (aged 18)	Bryne	2020		1	1
57	Gustav Nyheim	(Norway)	FW	13 February 2006 (aged 16)	Academy	2021		1	0
Out on loan
32	Niklas Haugland	(Norway)	FW	23 February 2002 (aged 20)	Unattached	2021	2022	0	0
Players who left club during season

== Transfers ==
=== In ===
Date	Position	Nationality	Name	From	Fee	Ref.
1 January 2022	GK	(Norway)	Jacob Karlstrøm	Tromsø	Undisclosed	
17 January 2022	MF	(Norway)	Markus Kaasa	Odd	Undisclosed	
24 January 2022	MF	(Norway)	Johan Bakke	Sogndal	Undisclosed	
2 February 2022	DF	(Denmark)	Benjamin Hansen	Haugesund	Undisclosed	
7 February 2022	DF	(Norway)	Eirik Haugan	Östersund	Undisclosed	
2 August 2022	MF	(Norway)	Kristian Eriksen	HamKam	Undisclosed	

=== Out ===
Date	Position	Nationality	Name	To	Fee	Ref.
30 March 2022	MF	(Norway)	Tobias Hestad	Gjøvik-Lyn	Undisclosed	

=== Loans out ===
Date from	Position	Nationality	Name	To	Date to	Ref.
15 January 2022	FW	(Norway)	Albert Tjåland	Bryne	31 July 2022	
31 January 2022	GK	(Belgium)	Álex Craninx	Seraing	31 June 2022	
8 April 2022	FW	(Norway)	Niklas Haugland	Åsane	31 December 2022	

=== Released ===
Date	Position	Nationality	Name	Joined	Date	Ref.
31 December 2022	DF	(Norway)	Kristoffer Haraldseid			
31 December 2022	MF	(Norway)	Etzaz Hussain	Apollon Limassol	20 January 2023	
31 December 2022	FW	(Iceland)	Björn Bergmann Sigurðarson	ÍA		
31 December 2022	FW	(Ivory Coast)	Mathis Bolly	Lillestrøm	6 September 2023	
31 December 2022	FW	(Norway)	Niklas Haugland	IL Gneist	3 January 2023	

== Friendlies ==
27 January 2022	Molde (Norway)	1–0	(Luxembourg) F91 Dudelange	Dehesa de Campoamor, Spain
15:00 CET (UTC+1)	Grødem 10'	Report

11 February 2022	Hammarby (Sweden)	1–3	(Norway) Molde	Marbella, Spain
13:00 CET (UTC+1)	(yellow card) 20'; Erabi 54'; Andersen (yellow card) 58'	Report	(yellow card) 10'; Eikrem 20'; (yellow card) 55'; Fofana 56', 72'

15 February 2022	Molde (Norway)	0–2	(Russia) Rostov	Marbella, Spain
16:00 CET (UTC+1)		Report	Poloz 25'; Sowe 57'

19 February 2022	Molde (Norway)	3–0	(Russia) Lokomotiv Moscow	Marbella, Spain
16:00 CET (UTC+1)	Fofana 24', 90'; Andersen 70'	Report

1 March 2022	Molde	5–0	Ham-Kam	Molde
14:00 CET (UTC+1)	Brynhildsen 3'; Bolly 18'; Andersen 34' (pen.), 53'; Fofana 77'	Report		Stadium: Aker Stadion

11 June 2022	Molde (Norway)	2–1	(Sweden) AIK	Molde
12:00 CET (UTC+1)	Haugan 6'; Breivik (yellow card) 34'; Grødem 64'	Report	Strannegård 73'; C.Sichenje (yellow card) 90+3'	Stadium: Aker Stadion

== Competitions ==
=== Overview ===
Competition	First match	Last match	Starting round	Final position	Record							
Competition	First match	Last match	Starting round	Final position	Pld	W	D	L	GF	GA	GD	Win %
Eliteserien	2 April 2022	13 November 2022	Matchday 1	Winners	30	25	3	2	71	25	+46	83.33
2021 Norwegian Cup	13 March 2022	1 May 2022	Fourth round	Winners	4	4	0	0	11	4	+7	100.00
2022 Norwegian Cup	18 May 2022	See 2023 Season	First round	See 2023 Season	3	3	0	0	10	3	+7	100.00
UEFA Europa Conference League	24 July 2022	3 November 2022	Second qualifying round	Group Stage	12	6	1	5	23	18	+5	50.00
Total					49	38	4	7	115	50	+65	77.55

Last updated: 13 November 2022
Source: Competitions

=== Eliteserien ===
==== Results summary ====
Overall								Home						Away					
Pld	W	D	L	GF	GA	GD	Pts	W	D	L	GF	GA	GD	W	D	L	GF	GA	GD
30	25	3	2	71	25	+46	78	12	1	2	39	13	+26	13	2	0	32	12	+20

Last updated: 13 November 2022.
Source: see below

==== Results by match ====
Match	1	2	3	4	5	6	7	8	9	10	11	12	13	14	15	16	17	18	19	20	21	22	23	24	25	26	27	28	29	30
Ground	H	A	H	A	H	H (Note: matchday 18)	A (Note: matchday 6)	H (Note: matchday 7)	A (Note: matchday 8)	H (Note: matchday 9)	A (Note: matchday 10)	A (Note: matchday 12)	H (Note: matchday 11)	H (Note: matchday 13)	H (Note: matchday 14)	A (Note: matchday 15)	A (Note: matchday 16)	A (Note: matchday 17)	A	H	A	A	H	A	H	A	H	A	H	A
Result	W	W	L	D	L	W	W	W	W	W	W	D	D	W	W	W	W	W	W	W	W	W	W	W	W	W	W	W	W	W
Position	5	1	3	5	3	3	3	3	3	2	2	2	2	1	1	1	1	1	1	1	1	1	1	1	1	1	1	1	1	1

Updated to match(es) played on 13 November 2022. Source: see below
A = Away; H = Home; W = Win; D = Draw; L = Loss

==== Results ====
2 April 2022 1	Molde	1–0	Vålerenga	Molde
18:00 CEST (UTC+2)	Brynhildsen (yellow card) 16'; Linnes 56'	Report	Dønnum (yellow card) 44' (yellow-red card) 90'; Tollås (yellow card) 86'	Stadium: Aker Stadion; Attendance: 6,235; Referee: Kristoffer Hagenes

10 April 2022 2	Strømsgodset	1–3	Molde	Drammen
18:00 CEST (UTC+2)	Friday 40'	Report	Knudtzon (yellow card) 31'; Andersen (yellow card) 45' (goal) 67'; Haugan (yellow card) 46'; Linnes 57'; Kaasa 78'	Stadium: Marienlyst Stadion; Attendance: 3,897; Referee: Tore Hansen

18 April 2022 3	Molde	1–2	Lillestrøm	Molde
18:00 CEST (UTC+2)	Haugan (yellow card) 54'; Haugen 79'; Hussain (yellow card) 84'	Report	Ogbu 18'; Edh (yellow card) 29'; Åsen (yellow card) 70'; Friðjónsson 90+7'	Stadium: Aker Stadion; Attendance: 5,899; Referee: Kai Erik Steen

24 April 2022 4	Rosenborg	0–0	Molde	Trondheim
20:00 CEST (UTC+2)	Sæter (yellow card) 73'; Giampaoli (yellow card) 81'	Report	Hansen (yellow card) 25'; Mannsverk (yellow card) 51'; Knudtzon (yellow card) 64'	Stadium: Lerkendal Stadion; Attendance: 14,327; Referee: Espen Eskås

7 May 2022 5	Molde	3–4	Viking	Molde
18:00 CEST (UTC+2)	Kaasa 13'; Eikrem (yellow card) 16' (goal) 27'; Brynhildsen 24'; Hansen (red card) 61'; Breivik (yellow card) 64'; Mannsverk (yellow card) 90+5'	Report	Stensness (yellow card) 26'; Løkberg 29'; Berisha 62' (pen.), 82'; Tangen 71'; Sebulonsen (yellow card) 81'; Solbakken (yellow card) 90+2'	Stadium: Aker Stadion; Attendance: 6,190; Referee: Kristoffer Hagenes

11 May 2022 18	Molde	3–0	Odd	Molde
19:00 CEST (UTC+2)	Eikrem 14'; Mannsverk 33' (pen.) (yellow card) 53'; Grødem 62'	Report	Bjørtuft (yellow card) 27' (red card) 32'; Jos.Kitolano (yellow card) 83'	Stadium: Aker Stadion; Attendance: 5,045; Referee: Svein Oddvar Moen
Note: Match moved from 14 August due to Molde's participation in the UEFA Europa Conference League.

16 May 2022 6	Aalesund	0–2	Molde	Ålesund
18:00 CEST (UTC+2)	Čanađija (yellow card) 20'; Golubović (yellow card) 26'; Solnørdal (yellow card) 90+1'	Report	Eikrem 2'; Zekhnini 43'; Mannsverk (yellow card) 49' Haugan (yellow card) 83'	Stadium: Color Line Stadion; Attendance: 10,778; Referee: Mohammad Usman Aslam

21 May 2022 7	Molde	2–1	Kristiansund	Molde
18:00 CEST (UTC+2)	Haugen 7'; Grødem 18'; Breivik (yellow card) 26'; Haugan (yellow card) 73'	Report	Aasbak (yellow card) 31'; Kartum (yellow card) 44'; Diop (yellow card) 74'; Isaksen (yellow card) 90'; Bye 90+3'	Stadium: Aker Stadion; Attendance: 6,971; Referee: Tore Hansen

26 May 2022 8	Sarpsborg 08	1–2	Molde	Sarpsborg
20:00 CEST (UTC+2)	Heintz 65'	Report	Grødem 50'; Fofana 68'; Karlstrøm (yellow card) 82'	Stadium: Sarpsborg Stadion; Attendance: 4,635; Referee: Christian Moen

29 May 2022 9	Molde	3–1	Bodø/Glimt	Molde
18:00 CEST (UTC+2)	Grødem 3'; Mannsverk (yellow card) 38'; Risa (yellow card) 46'; Fofana 59'; Eikrem (yellow card) 64'; Høibråten 76' (o.g.)	Report	Mvuka 65'	Stadium: Aker Stadion; Attendance: 6,156; Referee: Espen Eskås

19 June 2022 10	Odd	1–2	Molde	Skien
18:00 CEST (UTC+2)	Lauritsen 72'; Ingebrigtsen (yellow card) 90+3'	Report	Owusu 13' (o.g.); Risa (yellow card) 18'; Fofana 48' (yellow card) 66'; Kaasa (yellow card) 90+3'	Stadium: Skagerak Arena; Attendance: 5,095; Referee: Mohammad Aslam

3 July 2022 12	HamKam	0–0	Molde	Hamar
18:00 CEST (UTC+2)	Onsrud (yellow card) 40'; Melgalvis (yellow card) 61'; Eriksen (yellow card) 90+1'	Report	Haugan (yellow card) 56'	Stadium: Briskeby Arena; Attendance: 5,018; Referee: Sivert Amland

6 July 2022 11	Molde	1–1	Jerv	Molde
19:00 CEST (UTC+2)	Mannsverk (penalty missed) 33' (yellow card) 54'; Fofana 50'	Report	Sandberg (yellow card) 56'; Schröter 64'	Stadium: Aker Stadion; Attendance: 5,665; Referee: Ola Hobber Nilsen
Note: Match originally scheduled for 26 June, bu postponed on the day due to an outbreak of COVID-19 within the Jerv squad.

10 July 2022 13	Molde	5–1	Tromsø	Molde
18:00 CEST (UTC+2)	Knudtzon 15' (yellow card) 28'; Haugen 19'; Fofana 45+2', 61'; Kaasa 62'	Report	Kitolano 6' (yellow card) 38'; Vik (yellow card) 71'	Stadium: Aker Stadion; Attendance: 6,156; Referee: Svein Tore Sinnes

17 July 2022 14	Molde	1–0	Haugesund	Molde
18:00 CEST (UTC+2)	Fofana (yellow card) 44'; Grødem 56' (pen.); Breivik (yellow card) 72'	Report	Eskesen (yellow card) 59'	Stadium: Aker Stadion; Attendance: 5,377; Referee: Mohammad Usman Aslam

24 July 2022 15	Sandefjord	2–3	Molde	Sandefjord
18:00 CEST (UTC+2)	Haugan 35' (o.g.); Haakenstad 77'	Report	Linnes 44'; Kaasa 49'; Brynhildsen 84'	Stadium: Sandefjord Arena; Attendance: 2,980; Referee: Espen Eskås

31 July 2022 16	Molde	3–0	Strømsgodset	Molde
15:30 CEST (UTC+2)	Grødem 9'; Hansen (yellow card) 27'; Brynhildsen 72'; Zekhnini (yellow card) 90' (goal) 90+1'	Report		Stadium: Aker Stadion; Attendance: 5,791; Referee: Ola Hobber Nilsen

7 August 2022 17	Kristiansund	2–3	Molde	Kristiansund
18:00 CEST (UTC+2)	Hopmark 5'; Bye 15'; Ulvestad (yellow card) 45+2'; Jarl (yellow card) 79'; Pemi (red card) 87'; Kalludra (yellow card) 90+3'	Report	Hussain (yellow card) 28'; Haugan 36'; Fofana 45+2' (pen.); Eriksen 48'; Zekhnini (yellow card) 79'	Stadium: Kristiansund Stadion; Attendance: 4,304; Referee: Kristoffer Hagenes

21 August 2022 19	Haugesund	0–1	Molde	Haugesund
18:00 CEST (UTC+2)	Ndour (yellow card) 60'	Report	Linnes 41'	Stadium: Haugesund Stadion; Attendance: 4,159; Referee: Marius Lien

28 August 2022 20	Molde	4–1	Sarpsborg 08	Molde
18:00 CEST (UTC+2)	Hussain 12'; Horn 28' (o.g.); Brynhildsen 42'; Zekhnini (yellow card) 67'; Grødem 79' (penalty missed) 88'	Report	Halvorsen (yellow card) 20'; Heintz 23'; Skipper (red card) 33'; Thomassen (yellow card) 89'	Stadium: Aker Stadion; Attendance: 6,045; Referee: Kai Erik Steen

3 September 2022 21	Bodø/Glimt	1–4	Molde	Bodø
18:00 CEST (UTC+2)	Amundsen 45+1'; Mvuka (yellow card) 55'	Report	Breivik (yellow card) 14' (goal) 45+2'; Mannsverk (yellow card) 30'; Kaasa 37', 67'; Haugen (yellow card) 70'; Brynhildsen 83'	Stadium: Aspmyra Stadion; Attendance: 7,830; Referee: Espen Eskås

11 September 2022 22	Jerv	2–4	Molde	Grimstad
18:00 CEST (UTC+2)	Løvik 81' (o.g.); Norheim 85'	Report	Kaasa 41'; Brynhildsen 51'; Hansen (yellow card) 71'; Fofana 88', 90+4'; Petersen (yellow card) 90+3'	Stadium: Levermyr Stadion; Attendance: 2,500; Referee: Daniel Higraff

18 September 2022 23	Molde	3–0	Aalesund	Molde
20:00 CEST (UTC+2)	Haugan (yellow card) 17'; Brynhildsen 23'; Kaasa 84'; Eriksen 87'	Report	Čanađija (yellow card) 18'; Kallevåg (yellow card) 61'	Stadium: Aker Stadion; Attendance: 6,251; Referee: Ola Hobber Nilsen

1 October 2022 24	Tromsø	0–1	Molde	Tromsø
16:00 CEST (UTC+2)		Report	Brynhildsen 23'	Stadium: Alfheim Stadion; Referee: Espen Eskås

9 October 2022 25	Molde	5–0	HamKam	Molde
17:00 CEST (UTC+2)	Eikrem 7', 36'; Brynhildsen 12'; Kaasa 25'; Fofana 71'	Report		Stadium: Aker Stadion; Attendance: 7,092; Referee: Mohammad Usman Aslam

16 October 2022 26	Lillestrøm	0–1	Molde	Lillestrøm
19:00 CEST (UTC+2)	Olsen (yellow card) 23'	Report	Kaasa (yellow card) 55'; Hussain 90+5'	Stadium: Åråsen Stadion; Attendance: 6,639; Referee: Tom Harald Hagen

23 October 2022 27	Molde	2–1	Rosenborg	Molde
19:00 CEST (UTC+2)	Breivik (yellow card) 7'; Brynhildsen 8'; Fofana 63'; Karlstrøm (yellow card) 88'	Report	Henriksen (yellow card) 18'; Cornic (yellow card) 32' (goal) 76'	Stadium: Aker Stadion; Attendance: 10,755; Referee: Tore Hansen

30 October 2022 28	Viking	1–4	Molde	Stavanger
19:00 CET (UTC+1)	Tripić (yellow card) 27'; Diop (yellow card) 36' (goal) 56'	Report	Fofana 2', 58'; Knudtzon 43'; Risa (yellow card) 70'; Ødegård 82'; Grødem (yellow card) 84'; Haugan (yellow card) 85'	Stadium: Viking Stadion; Attendance: 7,937; Referee: Christian Moen

6 November 2022 29	Molde	2–1	Sandefjord	Molde
17:00 CET (UTC+1)	Fofana 26' (pen.); Eikrem 65'	Report	Taaje (yellow card) 25'; Winbo 63'; Singh (yellow card) 84'; Bikoro (yellow card) 90+1'	Stadium: Aker Stadion; Attendance: 7,306; Referee: Mohammad Usman Aslam

13 November 2022 30	Vålerenga	1–2	Molde	Oslo
17:00 CET (UTC+1)	Børven 10'; Bjørdal (yellow card) 37'; Jensen (yellow card) 47'	Report	Brynhildsen 79'; Fofana 82' (pen.)	Stadium: Intility Arena; Attendance: 8,005; Referee: Kai Erik Steen

==== Table ====
Pos	Team	Pld	W	D	L	GF	GA	GD	Pts	Qualification or relegation
1	Molde (C)	30	25	3	2	71	25	+46	78	Qualification for the Champions League second qualifying round
2	Bodø/Glimt	30	18	6	6	86	41	+45	60	Qualification for the Europa Conference League second qualifying round
3	Rosenborg	30	16	8	6	69	44	+25	56	Qualification for the Europa Conference League second qualifying round
4	Lillestrøm	30	16	5	9	49	34	+15	53	
5	Odd	30	13	6	11	43	45	−2	45	

Source: Football Association of Norway (in Norwegian)
Rules for classification: 1) Points; 2) Goal difference; 3) Goals scored; 4) Head-to-head points; 5) Head-to-head goal difference; 6) Head-to-head goals scored.
(C) Champions

=== Norwegian Cup ===
==== 2021 ====
13 March 2022 Fourth round	Molde	3–2 (a.e.t.)	Odd	Molde
20:10 CET (UTC+1)	Karlstrøm (yellow card) 8'; Fofana (yellow card) 37' (goal) 116'; Andersen 82'; Linnes (yellow card) 90+3'; Hussain (yellow card) 96'; Haugen 119' (yellow card) 120+2'; Eikrem (yellow card) 120'	Report	Lauritsen (penalty missed) 8'; Jørgensen 12'; Jevtović (yellow card) 43'; Rólantsson 105' (yellow card) 120+2'	Stadium: Aker Stadion; Referee: Tom Harald Hagen

20 March 2022 Quarterfinal	Molde	4–2	Sarpsborg 08	Molde
16:15 CET (UTC+1)	Brynhildsen 21'; Eikrem 48'; Linnes (yellow card) 52' (goal) 90+2'; Haugan (yellow card) 66'; Andersen 80'	Report	Maigaard 5'; Skålevik 76' (red card) 85'	Stadium: Aker Stadion; Attendance: 3,309; Referee: Rohit Saggi

6 April 2022 Semifinal	Molde	3–0	Strømsgodset	Molde
18:00 CEST (UTC+2)	Risa (yellow card) 22'; Eikrem 58', 78'; Leifsson 88' (o.g.)	Report	Friday (yellow card) 55'; Gunnarsson (yellow card) 58'; Leifsson (yellow card) 85'; Stengel (yellow card) 89'	Stadium: Aker Stadion; Attendance: 3,805; Referee: Espen Eskås

===== Final =====
1 May 2022	Bodø/Glimt	0–1	Molde	Oslo
16:00 CEST (UTC+2)	Khaykin (yellow card) 74'	Report	Breivik (yellow card) 45'; Hansen (yellow card) 67'; Mannsverk 76' (pen.)	Stadium: Ullevaal Stadion; Attendance: 19,657; Referee: Rohit Saggi

==== 2022 ====
18 May 2022 First round	Herd	0–2	Molde	Ålesund
18:00 CEST (UTC+2)		Report	Fofana 18'; Ødegård 69'	Stadium: AMFI Moa Stadium; Attendance: 300; Referee: Even Myrheim

22 June 2022 Second round	Brattvåg	2–4	Molde	Ålesund
18:00 CEST (UTC+2)	Risa 7' (o.g.); T.Flem 37'; O.Husby (yellow card) 76'; G.Rogne (yellow card) 90'	Report	Løvik 12'; Grødem 44' (pen.); Hansen (yellow card) 55'; Haugan 83'; Fofana 86'	Stadium: Brattvåg Kunstgress; Attendance: 733; Referee: Mathias Kringstad

29 June 2022 Third round	Eidsvold Turn	1–4	Molde	Eidsvoll
18:00 CEST (UTC+2)	O.Nesset 39' (pen.) (yellow card) 81'	Report	Linnes 27'; Grødem 65', 90'; Mannsverk (yellow card) 77'; Zekhnini 81'	Stadium: Myhrer Stadion; Attendance: 622; Referee: Marius Lien

Progressed to the Fourth round which took place in the 2023 season.

=== Europa Conference League ===
==== Qualifying rounds ====
21 July 2022 Second qualifying round 1st leg	Molde (Norway)	4–1	(Sweden) Elfsborg	Molde, Norway
18:00 CEST (UTC+2)	Kaasa 49'; Haugen 55'; Breivik 60'; Mannsverk 81' (pen.); Knudtzon (yellow card) 90+1'; Hansen (yellow card) 90+3'	Report	Alm 14'; Strand (yellow card) 43'; Larsson (yellow card) 50'; Rømer (yellow card) 50'; Henriksson (yellow card) 57'; Holmén (yellow card) 75'; Väisänen (yellow card) 80'; Boateng (red card) 90+3'	Stadium: Aker Stadion; Attendance: 4,771; Referee: Willy Delajod (France)

28 July 2022 Second qualifying round 2nd leg	Elfsborg (Sweden)	1–2 (2–6 agg.)	(Norway) Molde	Borås, Sweden
18:45 CEST (UTC+2)	Jarjué (yellow card) 7'; Baidoo 40'	Report	Haugan (yellow card) 24'; Breivik 54'; Fofana 83'	Stadium: Borås Arena; Attendance: 3,441; Referee: Peter Bankes (England)

4 August 2022 Third qualifying round 1st leg	Molde (Norway)	3–0	(Hungary) Kisvárda	Molde, Norway
19:00 CEST (UTC+2)	Breivik (yellow card) 60'; Hussain 63' (yellow card) 90+2'; Fofana 81'; Linnes 82'	Report	Kravchenko (yellow card) 59'; Ötvös (yellow card) 64'; M.Ilievski (yellow card) 90+2'	Stadium: Aker Stadion; Attendance: 3,404; Referee: Aleksandar Stavrev (North Macedonia)

11 August 2022 Third qualifying round 2nd leg	Kisvárda (Hungary)	2–1 (2–4 agg.)	(Norway) Molde	Kisvárda, Hungary
21:00 CEST (UTC+2)	Asani 14', 29' (yellow card) 49'; Hey (yellow card) 46'; Camaj (yellow card) 57'	Report	Breivik (yellow card) 59'; Mannsverk 69'; Zekhnini (yellow card) 90+1'	Stadium: Várkerti Stadion; Attendance: 2,548; Referee: Alain Durieux (Luxembourg)

18 August 2022 Playoff round 1st leg	Molde (Norway)	0–1	(Austria) Wolfsberger AC	Molde, Norway
19:00 CEST (UTC+2)	Brynhildsen (yellow card) 69'; Haugan (yellow card) 87'	Report	Baribo 22'; Röcher (yellow card) 63'	Stadium: Aker Stadion; Attendance: 4,761; Referee: Anastasios Papapetrou (Greece)

25 August 2022 Playoff round 2nd leg	Wolfsberger AC (Austria)	0–4 (1–4 agg.)	(Norway) Molde	Klagenfurt, Austria
19:00 CEST (UTC+2)	Vizinger (yellow card) 35'; Vergos (yellow card) 81'	Report	Breivik 6'; Mannsverk 34' (yellow card) 47'; Brynhildsen 72', 90+3'; Karlstrøm (yellow card) 81'; Grødem (yellow card) 87'	Stadium: Wörthersee Stadion; Attendance: 3,105; Referee: Rob Harvey (Republic of Ireland)
Note: Wolfsberger AC played their home matche at the Wörthersee Stadion, in Klagenfurt, instead of their regular venue, the Lavanttal-Arena, in Wolfsberg, which did not meet UEFA requirements.

==== Group stage ====
Pos	Team	Pld	W	D	L	GF	GA	GD	Pts	Qualification
1	(Sweden) Djurgårdens IF	6	5	1	0	12	6	+6	16	Advance to round of 16
2	(Belgium) Gent	6	2	2	2	10	6	+4	8	Advance to knockout round play-offs
3	(Norway) Molde	6	2	1	3	9	10	−1	7	
4	(Republic of Ireland) Shamrock Rovers	6	0	2	4	1	10	−9	2	

Source: UEFA

8 September 2022 1	Molde (Norway)	0–0	(Belgium) Gent	Molde, Norway
21:00 CEST (UTC+2)	Hussain (yellow card) 60'; Kaasa (yellow card) 74'	Report	Hanche-Olsen (yellow card) 34'; Kums (yellow card) 61'; Torunarigha (yellow card) 79'	Stadium: Aker Stadion; Attendance: 4,158; Referee: Petri Viljanen (Finland)

15 September 2022 2	Djurgårdens IF (Sweden)	3–2	(Norway) Molde	Stockholm, Sweden
18:45 CEST (UTC+2)	Edvardsen (yellow card) 40'; Doumbouya 50'; Banda 58'; Asoro 90+1' (yellow card) 90+2'	Report	Fofana 39' (pen.) (yellow card) 39' (yellow-red card) 57'; Grødem (yellow card) 66'; Breivik 77'; Eriksen (yellow card) 83'; Mannsverk (yellow card) 89'	Stadium: Tele2 Arena; Attendance: 16,673; Referee: Gergő Bogár (Hungary)

6 October 2022 3	Molde (Norway)	3–0	(Republic of Ireland) Shamrock Rovers	Molde, Norway
18:45 CEST (UTC+2)	Brynhildsen 10', 49' (yellow card) 63'; Mannsverk (yellow card) 51'; Hussain 58'; Haugan (yellow card) 67'	Report	A.Emakhu (yellow card) 26'; Kavanagh (yellow card) 60'; N.Farrugia (yellow card) 82'	Stadium: Aker Stadion; Attendance: 3,669; Referee: Miloš Milanović (Serbia)

13 October 2022 4	Shamrock Rovers (Republic of Ireland)	0–2	(Norway) Molde	Dublin, Republic of Ireland
21:00 CEST (UTC+2)	Cleary (yellow card) 6'; G.O'Neill (yellow card) 87'	Report	Fofana 33' (yellow card) 53'; Eriksen 69' (yellow card) 79'; Breivik (yellow card) 78'	Stadium: Tallaght Stadium; Attendance: 5,860; Referee: Dario Bel (Croatia)

27 October 2022 5	Molde (Norway)	2–3	(Sweden) Djurgårdens IF	Molde, Norway
21:00 CEST (UTC+2)	Brynhildsen 6' (yellow card) 70'; Kaasa 21'; Risa (yellow card) 45'; Breivik (yellow card) 58'; Løvik (yellow card) 65'	Report	Edvardsen 44'; Schüller (yellow card) 58'; Asoro 67'; Radetinac 77'	Stadium: Aker Stadion; Attendance: 5,545; Referee: Urs Schnyder (Switzerland)

3 November 2022 6	Gent (Belgium)	4–0	(Norway) Molde	Ghent, Belgium
18:45 CET (UTC+1)	Hjulsager (yellow card) 32' (goal) 52'; Godeau 62'; Kums 80'; Cuypers 89' (pen.)	Report	Risa (yellow card) 27'; Løvik (yellow card) 83'; Eriksen (yellow card) 90+3'	Stadium: Ghelamco Arena; Attendance: 12,000; Referee: Sebastian Gishamer (Austria)

== Squad statistics ==
As of match played 13 November 2022

=== Appearances and goals ===
No.	Pos	Nat	Player	Total		Eliteserien		2021 Norwegian Cup		2022 Norwegian Cup		Europa Conference League	
No.	Pos	Nat	Player	Apps	Goals	Apps	Goals	Apps	Goals	Apps	Goals	Apps	Goals
1	GK	(Norway) NOR	Jacob Karlstrøm	42	0	26	0	4	0	0	0	12	0
2	DF	(Norway) NOR	Martin Bjørnbak	21	0	15+2	0	1	0	0	0	3	0
3	DF	(Norway) NOR	Birk Risa	42	0	26	0	4	0	2	0	10	0
4	DF	(Denmark) DEN	Benjamin Hansen	42	0	23+2	0	4	0	3	0	9+1	0
7	MF	(Norway) NOR	Magnus Wolff Eikrem	34	9	16+5	6	4	3	0+1	0	4+4	0
8	MF	(Norway) NOR	Sivert Mannsverk	44	5	22+3	1	4	1	1+2	0	12	3
9	FW	(Ivory Coast) CIV	Datro Fofana	39	22	19+5	15	2	1	2+1	2	8+2	4
11	MF	(Norway) NOR	Ola Brynhildsen	34	17	12+7	11	4	1	0	0	8+3	5
14	FW	(Norway) NOR	Erling Knudtzon	42	2	13+13	2	1+3	0	2+1	0	6+3	0
15	MF	(Norway) NOR	Markus Kaasa	39	12	17+8	9	0+4	1	2	0	5+3	2
16	MF	(Norway) NOR	Etzaz Hussain	30	4	9+9	2	2+1	0	0	0	4+5	2
17	MF	(Norway) NOR	Rafik Zekhnini	24	3	5+10	2	0+2	0	1+1	1	3+2	0
19	DF	(Norway) NOR	Eirik Haugan	44	2	22+4	1	3	0	3	1	12	0
20	MF	(Norway) NOR	Kristian Eriksen	23	3	10+3	2	0	0	0	0	2+8	1
21	DF	(Norway) NOR	Martin Linnes	38	7	23	4	3	1	1+1	1	9+1	1
22	FW	(Norway) NOR	Magnus Grødem	43	10	15+12	7	0+2	0	1+2	3	3+8	0
23	MF	(Norway) NOR	Eirik Andersen	8	3	3+1	1	2+2	2	0	0	0	0
24	MF	(Norway) NOR	Johan Bakke	11	0	1+7	0	0	0	1	0	1+1	0
25	MF	(Norway) NOR	Emil Breivik	44	5	22+5	1	2+2	0	2	0	11	4
26	GK	(Norway) NOR	Oliver Petersen	7	0	4	0	0	0	3	0	0	0
28	DF	(Norway) NOR	Kristoffer Haugen	30	5	17+2	3	4	1	1	0	6	1
30	FW	(Ivory Coast) CIV	Mathis Bolly	15	0	0+9	0	0	0	1+2	0	0+3	0
31	DF	(Norway) NOR	Mathias Løvik	21	1	9+4	0	0	0	2+1	1	4+1	0
33	MF	(Norway) NOR	Niklas Ødegård	15	2	1+10	1	0	0	2+1	1	0+1	0
40	FW	(Norway) NOR	Martin Kjørsvik	1	0	0	0	0	0	0+1	0	0	0
45	MF	(Norway) NOR	Leon-Robin Juberg-Hovland	1	0	0	0	0	0	0+1	0	0	0
54	MF	(Norway) NOR	Andreas Myklebust	1	0	0	0	0	0	1	0	0	0
58	DF	(Norway) NOR	Anders Børset	2	0	0+1	0	0	0	1	0	0	0
Players away from Molde on loan:
Players who appeared for Molde no longer at the club:

=== Goal scorers ===
Rank	Pos.	No.	Nat.	Player	Eliteserien	2021 Norwegian Cup	2022 Norwegian Cup	Europa Conference League	Total
1	FW	9	(Ivory Coast)	Datro Fofana	15	1	2	4	22
2	MF	11	(Norway)	Ola Brynhildsen	11	1	0	5	17
3	MF	15	(Norway)	Markus Kaasa	9	0	0	2	11
4	FW	22	(Norway)	Magnus Grødem	7	0	3	0	10
5	MF	7	(Norway)	Magnus Wolff Eikrem	6	3	0	0	9
6	DF	21	(Norway)	Martin Linnes	4	1	1	1	7
7	DF	28	(Norway)	Kristoffer Haugen	3	1	0	1	5
7	MF	8	(Norway)	Sivert Mannsverk	1	1	0	3	5
7	MF	25	(Norway)	Emil Breivik	1	0	0	4	5
10	MF	16	(Norway)	Etzaz Hussain	2	0	0	2	4
10				Own goal	3	1	0	0	4
12	MF	17	(Norway)	Rafik Zekhnini	2	0	1	0	3
12	MF	20	(Norway)	Kristian Eriksen	2	0	0	1	3
12	MF	23	(Norway)	Eirik Andersen	1	2	0	0	3
15	FW	14	(Norway)	Erling Knudtzon	2	0	0	0	2
15	DF	19	(Norway)	Eirik Haugan	1	0	1	0	2
15	MF	33	(Norway)	Niklas Ødegård	1	0	1	0	2
18	DF	31	(Norway)	Mathias Løvik	0	0	1	0	1
TOTALS					71	11	10	23	112

=== Clean sheets ===
Rank	Pos.	No.	Nat.	Player	Eliteserien	2021 Norwegian Cup	2022 Norwegian Cup	Europa Conference League	Total
1	GK	1	(Norway)	Jacob Karlstrøm	12	2	0	5	19
2	GK	26	(Norway)	Oliver Petersen	0	0	1	0	1
TOTALS					12	2	1	5	20

=== Disciplinary record ===
No.	Pos.	Nat.	Name	Eliteserien		2021 Norwegian Cup		2022 Norwegian Cup		Europa Conference League		Total	
No.	Pos.	Nat.	Name	Booked	Sent off (straight red)	Booked	Sent off (straight red)	Booked	Sent off (straight red)	Booked	Sent off (straight red)	Booked	Sent off (straight red)
1	GK	(Norway)	Jacob Karlstrøm	2	0	1	0	0	0	1	0	4	0
3	DF	(Norway)	Birk Risa	3	0	1	0	0	0	2	0	6	0
4	DF	(Denmark)	Benjamin Hansen	3	1	1	0	1	0	1	0	6	1
7	MF	(Norway)	Magnus Wolff Eikrem	2	0	1	0	0	0	0	0	3	0
8	MF	(Norway)	Sivert Mannsverk	7	0	0	0	1	0	3	0	11	0
9	FW	(Ivory Coast)	Datro Fofana	2	0	1	0	0	0	3	1	6	1
11	MF	(Norway)	Ola Brynhildsen	1	0	0	0	0	0	3	0	4	0
14	FW	(Norway)	Erling Knudtzon	3	0	0	0	0	0	1	0	4	0
15	MF	(Norway)	Markus Kaasa	2	0	0	0	0	0	1	0	3	0
16	MF	(Norway)	Etzaz Hussain	2	0	1	0	0	0	2	0	5	0
17	MF	(Norway)	Rafik Zekhnini	3	0	0	0	0	0	1	0	4	0
19	DF	(Norway)	Eirik Haugan	7	0	0	0	0	0	3	0	10	0
20	MF	(Norway)	Kristian Eriksen	0	0	0	0	0	0	3	0	3	0
21	DF	(Norway)	Martin Linnes	0	0	2	0	0	0	0	0	2	0
22	FW	(Norway)	Magnus Grødem	1	0	0	0	0	0	2	0	3	0
23	MF	(Norway)	Eirik Andersen	1	0	0	0	0	0	0	0	1	0
25	MF	(Norway)	Emil Breivik	5	0	1	0	0	0	4	0	10	0
26	GK	(Norway)	Oliver Petersen	1	0	0	0	0	0	0	0	1	0
28	DF	(Norway)	Kristoffer Haugen	1	0	2	0	0	0	0	0	3	0
31	DF	(Norway)	Mathias Løvik	0	0	0	0	0	0	2	0	2	0
Players who appeared for Molde no longer at the club:
TOTALS				46	1	11	0	2	0	30	1	89	2

== See also ==
- Molde FK seasons
