= Johan Bakke =

Norwegian footballer (born 2004)

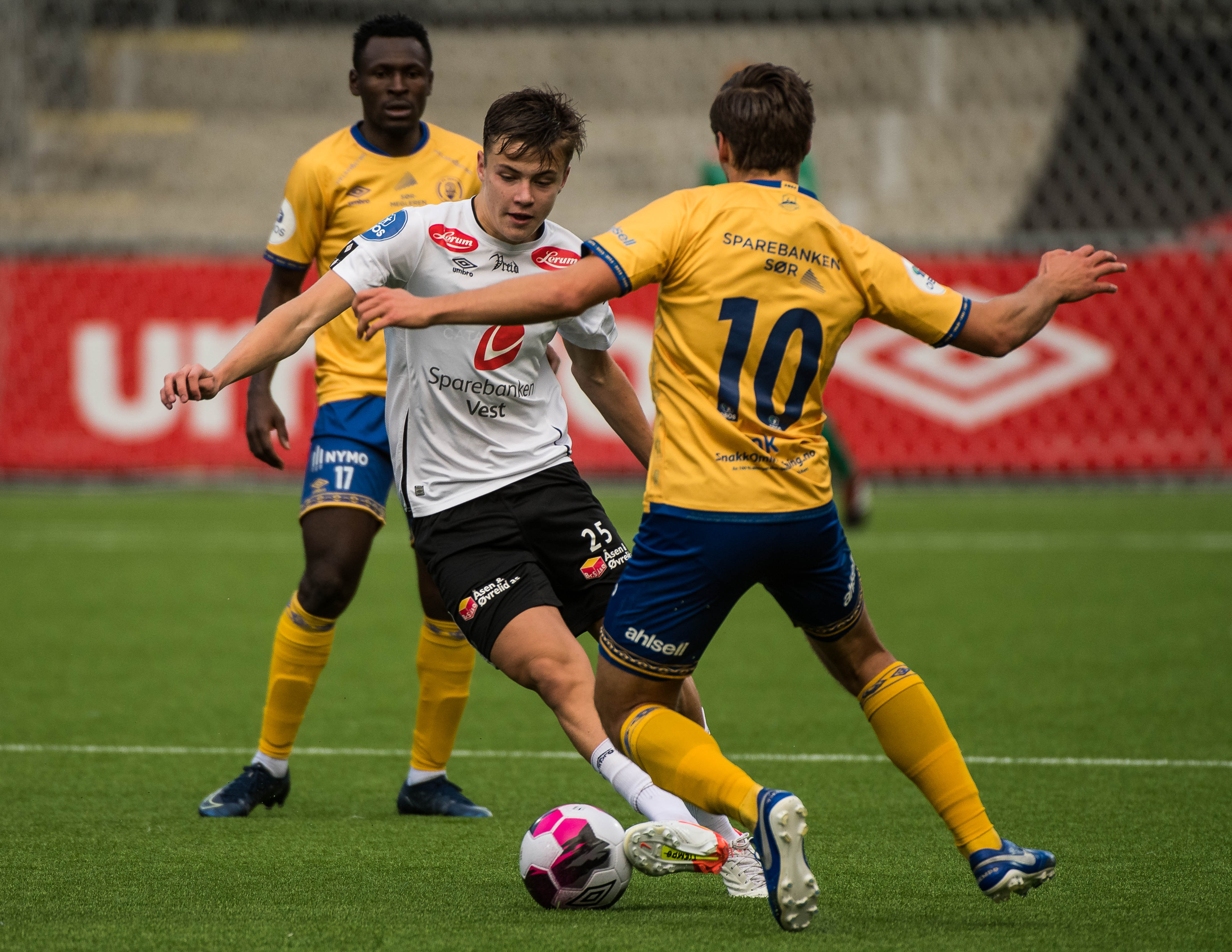

Personal information
- Full name: Johan Johanessen Bakke
- Date of birth: 1 May 2004 (age 22)
- Place of birth: Sogndal, Norway
- Height: 1.86 m (6 ft 1 in)
- Position: Midfielder

Team information
- Current team: Rosenborg
- Number: 25

Youth career
- –2021: Sogndal

Senior career*
Years	Team	Apps	(Gls)
2019–2021	Sogndal 2	7	(0)
2019–2022	Sogndal	23	(0)
2022–2023	Molde 2	11	(2)
2022–2025	Molde	17	(0)
2025–2026	Strømsgodset	16	(2)
2026–	Rosenborg	8	(0)

International career^{‡}
2021	Norway U17	3	(0)
2022	Norway U18	7	(0)
2023	Norway U19	1	(0)
- * Club domestic league appearances and goals as of 3 August 2026 ‡ National team caps and goals as of 27 September 2023

Johan Johanessen Bakke (born 1 May 2004) is a Norwegian professional footballer who plays as a midfielder for Rosenborg.

== Club career ==
=== Sogndal ===
Bakke came through the youth academy of Sogndal, where his father and grandfather also played. On 8 September 2020, he made his league debut for Sogndal against Strømmen.

=== Molde ===
On 24 January 2022, Bakke signed for Molde on a three-year contract from Sogndal. he was an unused substitute as Molde won the 2022 Norwegian Cup final; his first honour. On 25 January 2023, Molde extended their contract with Bakke until the end of 2026.

== Personal life ==
He is the son of former Norway International footballer Eirik Bakke, and grandson of Svein Bakke.

== Career statistics ==
As of 3 August 2026

Club	Season	League			National Cup		Europe		Other		Total	
Club	Season	Division	Apps	Goals	Apps	Goals	Apps	Goals	Apps	Goals	Apps	Goals
Sogndal 2	2019	3. divisjon	6	0	—		—		—		6	0
Sogndal 2	2021	3. divisjon	1	0	—		—		—		1	0
Sogndal 2	Total		7	0	—		—		—		7	0
Sogndal	2020	1. divisjon	3	0	—		—		—		3	0
Sogndal	2021	1. divisjon	20	0	3	0	—		1 (Note: Appearance in the Eliteserien play-offs)	0	24	0
Sogndal	Total		23	0	3	0	—		1	0	27	0
Molde 2	2022	3. divisjon	5	1	—		—		—		5	1
Molde 2	2023	3. divisjon	6	1	—		—		—		6	1
Molde 2	Total		11	2	—		—		—		11	2
Molde	2022	Eliteserien	8	0	1	0	1 (Note: Appearance in the UEFA Europa Conference League)	0	—		10	0
Molde	2023	Eliteserien	0	0	0	0	0	0	—		0	0
Molde	2024	Eliteserien	7	0	3	0	0	0	—		10	0
Molde	2025	Eliteserien	2	0	0	0	0	0	—		2	0
Molde	Total		17	0	4	0	1	0	—		22	0
Strømsgodset	2025	Eliteserien	16	2	0	0	—		—		16	2
Rosenborg	2026	Eliteserien	8	0	1	0	—		—		9	0
Career total			58	2	8	0	1	0	1	0	68	2

== Honours ==
Molde

- Eliteserien: 2022

Individual

- Eliteserien Young Player of the Month: August/September 2025
