= Marko Farji =

Kurdish Iraqi footballer (born 2004)

Personal information
- Full name: Marko Zana Hussein Farji
- Date of birth: 16 March 2004 (age 22)
- Place of birth: Grimstad Municipality, Norway
- Height: 1.84 m (6 ft 1/2 in)
- Position: Forward

Team information
- Current team: Heerenveen
- Number: 21

Youth career
- –2019: Jerv
- 2020–2023: Strømsgodset

Senior career*
Years	Team	Apps	(Gls)
2019	Jerv 2	11	(0)
2021–2024	Strømsgodset 2	54	(21)
2022–2026	Strømsgodset	63	(10)
2026	Venezia	2	(0)
2026–	Heerenveen	1	(1)

International career^{‡}
2023–2024	Iraq U23	7	(0)
2024–	Iraq	14	(0)
- * Club domestic league appearances and goals as of 21 May 2026 ‡ National team caps and goals as of 22 June 2026

Marko Zana Hussein Farji (Arabic: ماركو زانا حسين فرج; Kurdish: Marko Zana Husên Fercî; born 16 March 2004) is a professional footballer who plays as a forward for Eredivise club Heerenveen. Born in Norway, he plays for the Iraq national team.

== Early life ==
Born in Grimstad Municipality, Norway in 2004, he was born to Kurdish parents from Sulaymaniyah, Iraqi Kurdistan; he moved with his family to Gulskogen in the summer of 2020. Aged eleven, Farji was on a try-out at Manchester City's Academy.

== Club career ==
In early 2019, after playing for the clubs academy for several years, Farji signed his first professional contract with Jerv, which lasted until the 2021 season.

He made his senior debut for Strømsgodset in 2022 in the quarter final of the Norwegian Cup against Sandnes Ulf. He signed a professional contract with the club aged 18 years-old in January 2023. He scored his first league goal in the Eliteserien on 5 November 2023 in a 1–0 win against Tromsø.

On 8 January 2026, Farji signed a four-and-a-half-year contract with Venezia in Italy.

== International career ==
He has played for the Iraq U23, featuring against United States U23 on 18 November 2023. As of May 2024, Farji had appeared for the U23 team seven times.

In May 2024, Farji was called up to the Iraq team for their games in the Second Round of the Asian World Cup Qualifiers, but did not play in any of the games. Later, in December, Farji was again called up, this time for games in the Arabian Gulf Cup, where he got his debut against Yemen, as a substitute in a 1–0 win. His first start for the national team, came in June 2025, against Jordan. On 20 May 2026 Farji was included on the 26-man squad for the 2026 FIFA World Cup.

== Career statistics ==
=== Club ===
As of match played 21 May 2026

Appearances and goals by club, season and competition
Club	Season	League			National cup		Total	
Club	Season	Division	Apps	Goals	Apps	Goals	Apps	Goals
Jerv 2	2019	4. divisjon	11	0	—		11	0
Strømsgodset 2	2021	3. divisjon	12	6	—		12	6
Strømsgodset 2	2022	3. divisjon	21	8	—		21	8
Strømsgodset 2	2023	2. divisjon	20	6	—		20	6
Strømsgodset 2	2024	3. divisjon	1	1	—		1	1
Strømsgodset 2	Total		54	21	—		54	21
Strømsgodset	2022	Eliteserien	0	0	2	0	2	0
Strømsgodset	2023	Eliteserien	6	1	4	0	10	1
Strømsgodset	2024	Eliteserien	28	0	3	0	31	0
Strømsgodset	2025	Eliteserien	29	9	3	2	32	11
Strømsgodset	Total		62	10	11	2	73	12
Venezia	2025–26	Serie B	2	0	0	0	2	0
Heerenveen	2026–27	Eredivisie	0	0	0	0	0	0
Career total			129	31	11	2	140	33

== Honours ==
Venezia

- Serie B: 2025–26

Individual

- Eliteserien Young Player of the Month: April 2025
