= Eirik Haugan =

Norwegian footballer (born 1997)

Personal information
- Date of birth: 27 August 1997 (age 29)
- Place of birth: Ålesund, Norway
- Height: 1.80 m (5 ft 11 in)
- Position: Defender

Team information
- Current team: Molde
- Number: 19

Youth career
- 2002–2015: Molde

Senior career*
| Years | Team | Apps | (Gls) |
| 2014–2015 | Molde | 0 | (0) |
| 2015–2017 | Marseille B | 9 | (0) |
| 2017–2018 | Hødd | 40 | (6) |
| 2019–2021 | Östersunds | 66 | (0) |
| 2022– | Molde | 96 | (5) |

International career
| 2012 | Norway U15 | 7 | (0) |
| 2013 | Norway U16 | 4 | (0) |
| 2014 | Norway U17 | 11 | (0) |
| 2014–2015 | Norway U18 | 15 | (0) |
| 2016 | Norway U19 | 3 | (0) |
- * Club domestic league appearances and goals as of 1 December 2025

Eirik Haugan (born 27 August 1997) is a Norwegian footballer who plays for Molde.

== Career ==
Growing up in Molde, Haugan started his youth career in Molde FK at the age of 5. He was a Norway youth international from 2012.

=== Marseille ===
On 28 August 2015, Haugan left Molde to join Marseille. He never appeared in the first team, be it on the pitch or on the bench.

=== Östersund ===
On 13 February 2019, Östersund announced the signing of Haugan to a three-and-a-half-year contract.

=== Molde return ===
On 7 February 2022, Molde announced the return of Haugan from Östersund on a one-year contract. On 13 September 2022, Haugan extended his contract with Molde until the end of 2026. On 31 March 2026, Haugan extended his contract again with Molde, until the end of the 2029 season.

== Career statistics ==
=== Club ===
As of 12 July 2025

Appearances and goals by club, season and competition
| Club | Season | League | | | National cup (Note: Includes Norwegian Cup, Svenska Cupen) | | Continental | | Total | |
| Club | Season | Division | Apps | Goals | Apps | Goals | Apps | Goals | Apps | Goals |
|---|---|---|---|---|---|---|---|---|---|---|
| Molde | 2014 | Eliteserien | 0 | 0 | 1 | 0 | 0 | 0 | 1 | 0 |
| Molde | 2015 | Eliteserien | 0 | 0 | 1 | 0 | 0 | 0 | 1 | 0 |
| Molde | Total | | 0 | 0 | 2 | 0 | 0 | 0 | 2 | 0 |
| Marseille B | 2015–16 | Championnat de France Amateur | 1 | 0 | — | | — | | 1 | 0 |
| Marseille B | 2016–17 | Championnat de France Amateur | 8 | 0 | — | | — | | 8 | 0 |
| Marseille B | Total | | 9 | 0 | — | | — | | 9 | 0 |
| Hødd | 2017 | 2. divisjon | 15 | 2 | 0 | 0 | — | | 15 | 2 |
| Hødd | 2018 | 2. divisjon | 25 | 4 | 4 | 0 | — | | 29 | 4 |
| Hødd | Total | | 40 | 6 | 4 | 0 | — | | 44 | 6 |
| Östersund | 2019 | Allsvenskan | 12 | 0 | 1 | 0 | — | | 13 | 0 |
| Östersund | 2020 | Allsvenskan | 25 | 0 | 1 | 0 | — | | 26 | 0 |
| Östersund | 2021 | Allsvenskan | 29 | 0 | 5 | 1 | — | | 34 | 1 |
| Östersund | Total | | 66 | 0 | 7 | 1 | — | | 73 | 1 |
| Molde | 2022 | Eliteserien | 26 | 1 | 6 | 1 | 12 (Note: Appearances in UEFA Europa Conference League) | 0 | 44 | 2 |
| Molde | 2023 | Eliteserien | 20 | 0 | 8 | 0 | 8 (Note: Five appearances in UEFA Champions League, three appearances in UEFA Europa League) | 0 | 36 | 0 |
| Molde | 2024 | Eliteserien | 23 | 4 | 6 | 0 | 8 | 0 | 37 | 4 |
| Molde | 2025 | Eliteserien | 12 | 0 | 4 | 0 | — | | 16 | 0 |
| Molde | Total | | 81 | 5 | 24 | 1 | 28 | 0 | 133 | 6 |
| Career total | | | 196 | 11 | 37 | 2 | 28 | 0 | 261 | 13 |

== Honours ==
- Eliteserien: 2022
- Norwegian Cup: 2021–22, 2023
