= Grorud IL =

- Full name: Grorud Idrettslag
- Founded: 18 March 1918; 108 years ago
- Ground: Grorud matchbane, Oslo
- Manager: Johan Gjønnes Nilsen
- League: 2. divisjon
- 2024: 2. divisjon group 2, 5th of 14
- Website: https://grorud-il.no/
Home colours	Away colours

Grorud Idrettslag is a Norwegian sports club from Grorud borough, Oslo. It has sections for association football, skiing, gymnastics and tennis.

== General history ==
As a sports club based in Grorud, it had two predecessor clubs in Grorud IF, which existed from 1904 to 1905, and Grorud TIF, which existed from 1908 to 1914. Grorud IL was finally founded on 18 March 1918. At the time, Grorud was still located in Aker municipality. The district was incorporated into Oslo in 1948 and tied to the city centre with the Grorud Line of the Oslo Metro in 1966.

The club finished construction of its football field in 1926, and its ski jumping hill Rannkollen in 1928. In 1932 the football field was covered with gravel, which allowed the practice of skating sports during the winter. In 1932, Grorud IL was one of the first workers' sports clubs to take up the tennis sport.

Later secretary-general in the UN, Trygve Lie served as secretary in Grorud TIF, and became an honorary member of Grorud IL. He was a central person in the Norwegian Confederation of Trade Unions, and helped the club get a money loan in Akers Sparebank, which financed the field and hill construction. In 1929, Grorud IL decided to join the Workers' Sports Confederation (or AIF), where Trygve Lie also was a central figure. This connection ended in 1946 when the AIF was disbanded. By that time the club had got their club house, designed by noted architect Frode Rinnan.

In 1956, the new ski jumping hill Grorudbakken was opened. It fell apart in October 1957, but was rebuilt in steel. A grass football field was opened in 1966, and the field also featured an athletics track. An indoor arena was opened in 1974.

The club colors are yellow and blue.

== Football ==
The men's football team currently plays in 1. divisjon, the second tier of the Norwegian football league system, after being promoted from the 2019 2. divisjon As Grorud IL, the team played in the 3. divisjon, the fourth tier of Norwegian football, for many years, having been promoted to the 1994 season. After being relegated in 1997 the team quickly returned in 1999. After a long 3. divisjon stint, the team won promotion in 2011 and played in the 2012 2. divisjon.

The men's football team formerly cooperated to prop up an umbrella team called Groruddalen BK, but this team went defunct in 2008. Grorud IL was not the backbone of Groruddalen BK, however; this was Årvoll IL whose league spot was taken over by Groruddalen BK.

== Recent history ==
Season		Pos.	Pl.	W	D	L	GS	GA	P	Cup	Notes
2010	3. divisjon	2	22	14	3	5	69	31	45	Second round	
2011	3. divisjon	↑ 1	26	21	1	4	92	26	64	First qualifying round	Promoted
2012	2. divisjon	10	26	7	11	8	44	40	32	First round	
2013	2. divisjon	4	26	11	7	8	60	51	40	Second round	
2014	2. divisjon	7	26	9	8	9	49	51	35	Third round	
2015	2. divisjon	3	26	17	3	6	71	30	54	Second round	
2016	2. divisjon	4	26	15	6	5	63	39	51	Second round	
2017	2. divisjon	6	26	11	4	11	43	49	37	Second round	
2018	2. divisjon	3	26	14	6	6	46	31	48	Second round	
2019	2. divisjon	↑ 1	26	15	6	5	47	32	51	Third round	Promoted
2020	1. divisjon	13	30	9	7	14	45	56	34	Cancelled	
2021	1. divisjon	13	30	10	4	16	45	59	34	Third round	
2022	1. divisjon	↓ 15	30	4	8	18	34	69	20	Second round	Relegated
2023	2. divisjon	4	26	9	9	8	32	27	36	Second round	
2024	2. divisjon	5	26	12	9	5	73	45	45	First round	
2025	2. divisjon	2	26	17	3	6	58	36	54	Third round	

== Current squad ==
As of 1 September 2026

Note: Flags indicate national team as defined under FIFA eligibility rules; some limited exceptions apply. Players may hold more than one non-FIFA nationality.

No.	Pos.	Nation	Player
1	GK	SWE	Simon Andersson
2	DF	NOR	Mathusan Sandrakumar
3	DF	NOR	Bendik Brevik
4	DF	NOR	Tarik Mrakovic
5	DF	NOR	William Silfver-Ramage (on loan from Vålerenga)
6	MF	NOR	John Koko
7	MF	NOR	Marius Larsen
8	MF	NOR	Abel Tjomsland
9	FW	NOR	Mikael Harbosen Haga
10	MF	NOR	Adrian Berntsen
11	FW	NOR	Chrisander Sørum
14	FW	NOR	Emil Ringstad Kalnæs

No.	Pos.	Nation	Player
15	DF	NOR	Andreas Fjørtoft
16	MF	NOR	Samuel Silalahi (on loan from Strømsgodset)
17	MF	NOR	Jonas Dobloug Rasen
18	MF	NOR	Noah Gulbrandsen
19	MF	NOR	Mohammed Mahnin
21	FW	ERI	Awet Alemseged
22	DF	NOR	Simen Hagbø
23	DF	NOR	Tamsir Baboucarr Sosseh
24	DF	NOR	William Bjeglerud
31	GK	NOR	Leopold Strand (on loan from Vålerenga II)
42	MF	NOR	Mohammed Jatta

=== Out on loan ===
Note: Flags indicate national team as defined under FIFA eligibility rules; some limited exceptions apply. Players may hold more than one non-FIFA nationality.

No.	Pos.	Nation	Player
12	GK	NOR	Noah Rychter (at Lokomotiv Oslo until 31 December 2026)

== Athletics ==
The athletics section is now defunct, but has had several prominent members. Hilde Fredriksen notably finished sixth in the unofficial 1980 World Championships in 400 metres hurdles, and also holds the Norwegian record in the event. Trond Knaplund was a decathlete of national renown, and is now a coach.
