= Logi Tómasson =

Icelandic footballer (born 2000)

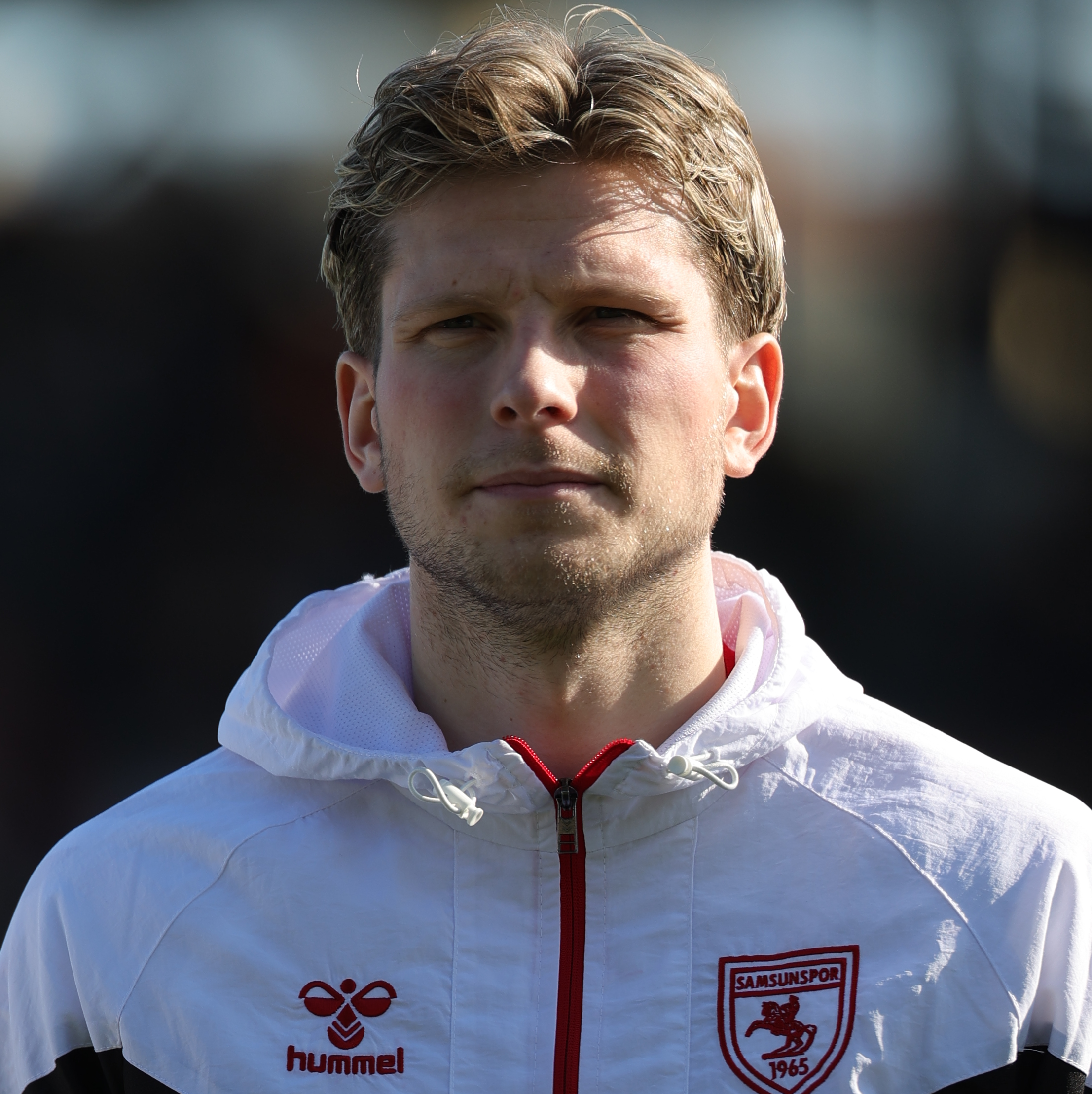

Personal information
- Date of birth: 13 September 2000 (age 26)
- Place of birth: Iceland
- Position: Left-back

Team information
- Current team: Samsunspor
- Number: 17

Youth career
- –2009: Víkingur Reykjavík
- 2009–2013: HK
- 2013–2018: Víkingur Reykjavík

Senior career*
| Years | Team | Apps | (Gls) |
| 2018–2023 | Víkingur Reykjavík | 83 | (9) |
| 2018 | → Þróttur Reykjavík (loan) | 11 | (0) |
| 2020 | → FH (loan) | 7 | (0) |
| 2023 | Strømsgodset 2 | 3 | (0) |
| 2023–2025 | Strømsgodset | 48 | (7) |
| 2025– | Samsunspor | 29 | (1) |

International career^{‡}
| 2016 | Iceland U17 | 2 | (0) |
| 2022 | Iceland U21 | 2 | (0) |
| 2022– | Iceland | 22 | (1) |
- * Club domestic league appearances and goals as of 10 June 2026 ‡ National team caps and goals as of 16 November 2026

Logi Tómasson (born 13 September 2000) is an Icelandic footballer who plays as a left-back for Turkish club Samsunspor and the Iceland national team.

== Club career ==
Logi has played his entire senior career with Víkingur Reykjavík apart from a loan spell in the second tier with Þróttur Reykjavík in 2018 and a loan spell in the top tier with FH in 2020.

On 22 August 2023, Logi moved to Strømsgodset in the Norwegian Eliteserien on a contract until end of 2026.

On June 7, 2025, Samsunspor announced to have signed Tómasson on a 4+1 years contract.

== International career ==
Logi made his international debut for Iceland on 6 November 2022 in a friendly match against Saudi Arabia.

== Career statistics ==
=== Club ===
As of 11 December 2025

Appearances and goals by club, season and competition
| Club | Season | League | | | National Cup (Note: Includes Icelandic Cup, Norwegian Cup) | | League Cup (Note: Includes Icelandic League Cup) | | Europe | | Other | | Total | |
| Club | Season | Division | Apps | Goals | Apps | Goals | Apps | Goals | Apps | Goals | Apps | Goals | Apps | Goals |
|---|---|---|---|---|---|---|---|---|---|---|---|---|---|---|
| Víkingur R. | 2017 | Úrvalsdeild | 0 | 0 | 0 | 0 | 2 | 0 | — | | — | | 2 | 0 |
| Víkingur R. | 2018 | Úrvalsdeild | 3 | 0 | 1 | 0 | 4 | 0 | — | | — | | 8 | 0 |
| Víkingur R. | 2019 | Úrvalsdeild | 16 | 2 | 3 | 0 | 3 | 0 | — | | — | | 22 | 2 |
| Víkingur R. | 2020 | Úrvalsdeild | 2 | 0 | 1 | 0 | 2 | 0 | — | | 1 (Note: Appearance(s) in the Icelandic Super Cup) | 0 | 6 | 0 |
| Víkingur R. | 2021 | Úrvalsdeild | 18 | 0 | 5 | 0 | 5 | 2 | — | | — | | 28 | 2 |
| Víkingur R. | 2022 | Besta deild karla | 26 | 5 | 4 | 3 | 5 | 2 | 8 (Note: Four appearances in UEFA Champions League, four appearances in UEFA Europa Conference League) | 0 | 1 | 0 | 44 | 10 |
| Víkingur R. | 2023 | Besta deild karla | 18 | 2 | 4 | 1 | 5 | 1 | 2 (Note: Two appearances in UEFA Europa Conference League) | 0 | 1 | 0 | 30 | 4 |
| Víkingur R. | Total | | 83 | 9 | 18 | 4 | 26 | 5 | 10 | 0 | 3 | 0 | 140 | 18 |
| Þróttur R. (loan) | 2018 | 1. deild karla | 11 | 0 | 0 | 0 | 0 | 0 | — | | — | | 11 | 0 |
| FH (loan) | 2020 | Úrvalsdeild | 7 | 0 | 2 | 0 | 0 | 0 | — | | — | | 9 | 0 |
| Strømsgodset | 2023 | Eliteserien | 10 | 1 | 0 | 0 | — | | — | | — | | 10 | 1 |
| Strømsgodset | 2024 | Eliteserien | 29 | 5 | 3 | 1 | — | | — | | — | | 32 | 6 |
| Strømsgodset | 2025 | Eliteserien | 9 | 1 | 2 | 1 | — | | — | | — | | 11 | 2 |
| Strømsgodset | Total | | 48 | 7 | 5 | 2 | — | | — | | — | | 53 | 9 |
| Strømsgodset 2 | 2023 | 2. divisjon | 3 | 0 | — | | | | | | | | 3 | 0 |
| Samsunspor | 2025–26 | Süper Lig | 15 | 0 | 0 | 0 | 0 | 0 | 7 (Note: One appearance in UEFA Europa League and four appearance and two goals in UEFA Conference League) | 1 | 0 | 0 | 22 | 1 |
| Career total | | | 167 | 16 | 25 | 6 | 26 | 5 | 17 | 1 | 3 | 0 | 238 | 27 |

=== International ===
Scores and results list Iceland's goal tally first, score column indicates score after each Logi goal.

List of international goals scored by Logi Tómasson
| No. | Date | Venue | Opponent | Score | Result | Competition |
|---|---|---|---|---|---|---|
| 1 | 11 October 2024 | Laugardalsvöllur Stadium, Reykjavík, Iceland | Wales | 1–2 | 2–2 | 2024–25 UEFA Nations League B |

== Other ==
Logi published an album in 2019 under the artist name Luigi, with songs from the album making it to top Spotify charts in Iceland.
