= Elias Melkersen =

Norwegian footballer (born 2002)

Personal information
- Full name: Elias Hoff Melkersen
- Date of birth: 31 December 2002 (age 23)
- Place of birth: Stjørdal, Norway
- Height: 1.73 m (5 ft 8 in)
- Position: Forward

Team information
- Current team: Strømsgodset
- Number: 9

Youth career
- –2018: Stjørdals-Blink
- 2018–2020: Bodø/Glimt

Senior career*
Years	Team	Apps	(Gls)
2018–2019	Bodø/Glimt 2	14	(5)
2020–2021	Bodø/Glimt	0	(0)
2020	→ Hødd (loan)	7	(4)
2021	→ Ranheim (loan)	26	(17)
2022–2024	Hibernian	24	(0)
2023	→ Sparta Rotterdam (loan)	2	(0)
2023	→ Strømsgodset (loan)	12	(4)
2024–	Strømsgodset	67	(22)

International career
2019	Norway U17	6	(2)
2020	Norway U18	3	(0)
2021–2022	Norway U20	7	(2)
2023–2024	Norway U21	5	(0)
- * Club domestic league appearances and goals as of 11 November 2026

Elias Hoff Melkersen (born 31 December 2002) is a Norwegian professional footballer who plays for Strømsgodset as a forward.

== Club career ==
=== Early career ===
Melkersen played in his native Norway with Bodø/Glimt, Hødd and Ranheim.

=== Hibernian ===
Melkersen signed for Scottish club Hibernian in January 2022. His transfer was delayed due to work permit issues.

Melkersen and Norwegian compatriot Runar Hauge made their Hibernian debuts on 2 March 2022, both appearing as substitutes. Following the match, and a later injury to Kevin Nisbet, Hibernian manager Shaun Maloney praised Melkersen's hard work and told him to 'step up' to first-team football. On 13 March 2022, Melkersen scored a brace in his first start for Hibernian, both proving decisive in the club's 2–1 win in the Scottish Cup quarter-finals against Motherwell.

Melkersen moved on loan to Dutch club Sparta Rotterdam in January 2023. He returned to Hibs at the end of the 2022–23 season, and made a few appearances early in the 2023–24 season before moving on loan to Strømsgodset.

=== Stromsgodset ===
The loan at Strømsgodset was successful, as Melkersen scored four goals and their manager Jørgen Isnes said he wished to sign the player permanently. A deal was agreed in December 2023, with the Norwegian club paying £1.2 million for the transfer. Melkersen signed a five-year contract with Strømsgodset.

== International career ==
Melkersen is a Norwegian youth international, representing them at under-17, under-18, under-20 and under-21 levels. He made his debut at under-21 level in a goalless draw with Scotland in June 2023.

== Career statistics ==
As of 1 November 2026

Appearances and goals by club, season and competition
Club	Season	League			National Cup (Note: Includes Norwegian Cup, Scottish Cup)		League Cup (Note: Includes Scottish League Cup)		Other		Total	
Club	Season	Division	Apps	Goals	Apps	Goals	Apps	Goals	Apps	Goals	Apps	Goals
Bodø/Glimt 2	2018	4. divisjon	1	1	—		—		—		1	1
Bodø/Glimt 2	2019	3. divisjon	13	4	—		—		—		13	4
Bodø/Glimt 2	Total		14	5	—		—		—		14	5
Bodø/Glimt	2019	Eliteserien	0	0	1	0	—		—		1	0
Bodø/Glimt	2020	Eliteserien	0	0	0	0	—		—		0	0
Bodø/Glimt	Total		0	0	1	0	—		—		1	0
Hødd (loan)	2020	2. divisjon	7	4	0	0	—		—		7	4
Ranheim (loan)	2021	1. divisjon	26	17	3	2	—		—		29	19
Hibernian	2021–22	Scottish Premiership	10	0	2	2	0	0	0	0	12	2
Hibernian	2022–23	Scottish Premiership	13	0	0	0	4	1	0	0	17	1
Hibernian	2023–24	Scottish Premiership	1	0	0	0	0	0	2 (Note: Appearances in UEFA Europa Conference League)	0	3	0
Hibernian	Total		24	0	2	2	4	1	2	0	32	3
Sparta Rotterdam (loan)	2022–23	Eredivisie	2	0	0	0	—		—		2	0
Strømsgodset (loan)	2023	Eliteserien	12	4	0	0	—		—		12	4
Strømsgodset	2024	Eliteserien	30	6	3	1	—		—		33	7
Strømsgodset	2025	Eliteserien	8	0	2	1	—		—		10	1
Strømsgodset	2026	1. divisjon	28	16	1	3	—		—		29	19
Strømsgodset	Total		78	26	6	5	0	0	0	0	84	31
Career total			147	52	12	9	4	1	2	0	165	62

== Honours ==
Individual

- Norwegian First Division Young Player of the Month: July 2021, October 2021
