= Samuel Silalahi =

Norwegian footballer (born 2005)

Personal information
- Full name: Samuel Agung Marcello Silalahi
- Date of birth: 2 June 2005 (age 21)
- Place of birth: Strømsgodset, Norway
- Height: 1.76 m (5 ft 9 in)
- Position: Midfielder

Team information
- Current team: Grorud (on loan from Strømsgodset)
- Number: 16

Youth career
- –2022: FK Mandalskameratene

Senior career*
| Years | Team | Apps | (Gls) |
| 2021 | FK Mandalskameratene | 11 | (0) |
| 2022– | Strømsgodset | 29 | (0) |
| 2022– | Strømsgodset 2 | 81 | (24) |
| 2026– | → Grorud (loan) | 11 | (5) |
- * Club domestic league appearances and goals as of 15 November 2026

Samuel Agung Marcello Silalahi (born 2 June 2005) is a Norwegian professional footballer who plays as a midfielder for Grorud, on loan from Norwegian First Division club Strømsgodset.

== Club career ==
In 2021, Silalahi played for the first team of FK Mandalskameratene against Arendal in the cup. He played for 56 minutes. In that match, his team lost 1–2.

On 17 October 2023, Silalahi signed his first professional contract with Strømsgodset. He made his debut for the A-team in the cup match against Hallingdal. His debut in the Eliteserien came on 21 April 2024 in the match against HamKam.

== Personal life ==
Born in Norway, Silalahi is of Indonesian descent.

== Career statistics ==
As of match played 30 November 2025

Appearances and goals by club, season and competition
| Club | Season | League | | | National cup | | Other | | Total | |
| Club | Season | Division | Apps | Goals | Apps | Goals | Apps | Goals | Apps | Goals |
|---|---|---|---|---|---|---|---|---|---|---|
| FK Mandalskameratene | 2021 | 3. divisjon | 11 | 0 | 0 | 0 | — | | 11 | 0 |
| Strømsgodset | 2022 | Eliteserien | 0 | 0 | 0 | 0 | — | | 0 | 0 |
| Strømsgodset | 2023 | Eliteserien | 0 | 0 | 0 | 0 | — | | 0 | 0 |
| Strømsgodset | 2024 | Eliteserien | 14 | 0 | 0 | 0 | — | | 14 | 0 |
| Strømsgodset | 2025 | Eliteserien | 13 | 0 | 3 | 0 | — | | 16 | 0 |
| Strømsgodset 2 | 2022 | Norwegian Third Division | 6 | 6 | 0 | 0 | — | | 6 | 6 |
| Strømsgodset 2 | 2023 | 2. divisjon | 26 | 4 | 0 | 0 | — | | 26 | 4 |
| Strømsgodset 2 | 2024 | Norwegian Third Division | 6 | 8 | 0 | 0 | — | | 6 | 8 |
| Strømsgodset 2 | 2025 | Norwegian Third Division | 1 | 1 | 0 | 0 | — | | 1 | 1 |
| Career total | | | 77 | 19 | 3 | 0 | 0 | 0 | 80 | 19 |
