= Gilli Rólantsson =

Faroese footballer (born 1992)

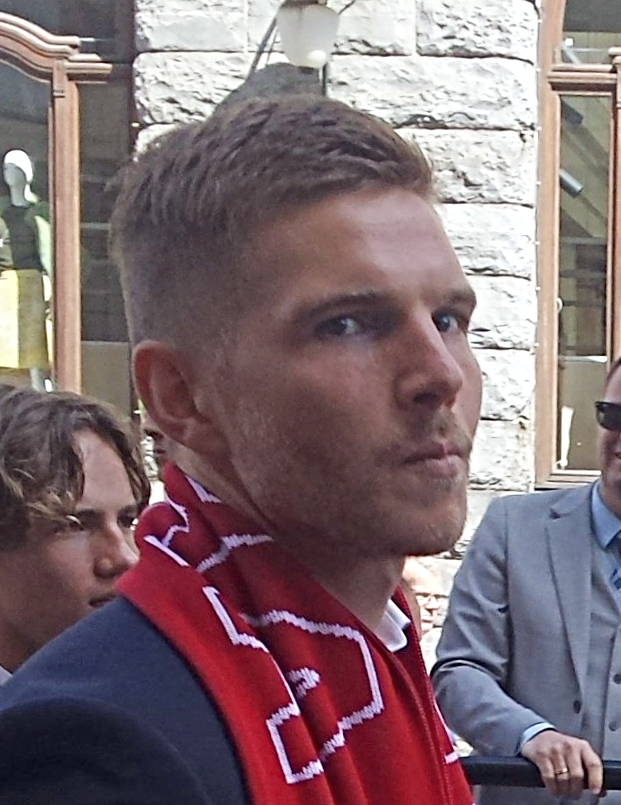

Personal information
- Full name: Gilli Rólantsson Sørensen
- Date of birth: 11 August 1992 (age 34)
- Place of birth: Tvøroyri, Faroe Islands
- Position: Full-back

Team information
- Current team: KÍ
- Number: 27

Youth career
- 2009: TB
- 2010: Aberdeen

Senior career*
Years	Team	Apps	(Gls)
2012–2013	TB	24	(6)
2013–2014	B36	25	(2)
2014–2016	AaB	23	(0)
2016–2020	Brann	97	(10)
2021–2022	Odd	42	(1)
2022–2023	TB	12	(0)
2023–2024	Vejle	6	(0)
2024–2025	TB	37	(1)
2025–	KÍ	24	(0)

International career^{‡}
2007–2008	Faroe Islands U17	10	(2)
2009–2010	Faroe Islands U19	6	(2)
2011–2013	Faroe Islands U21	11	(1)
2013–	Faroe Islands	66	(1)
- * Club domestic league appearances and goals as of 1 November 2026 ‡ National team caps and goals as of 19:26, 3 July 2023 (UTC)

Gilli Rólantsson Sørensen (born 11 August 1992) is a Faroese professional footballer who plays for Klaksvíkar Ítróttarfelag and the Faroe Islands national team.

== Career ==
He has earlier played for TB Tvøroyri, B36 Tórshavn, AaB and the Scottish U19 team of Aberdeen F.C. He was the captain of the Faroese U21 national football team.

On 10 February 2021 he signed a two-year deal with Norwegian Eliteserien club Odd.

On 3 July 2023 he signed a one-year deal with Danish Superliga club Vejle. Due to the high competition and limited playing minutes, the parties agreed to terminate the collaboration on 20 December 2023. He soon returned to his hometown club TB Tvoroyri.

== Career statistics ==
=== Club ===
As of match played 28 May 2022

Appearances and goals by club, season and competition
Club	Season	League			Cup		Europe		Total	
Club	Season	Division	Apps	Goals	Apps	Goals	Apps	Goals	Apps	Goals
TB	2012	Betri deildin menn	24	6	-		-		24	6
TB	Total		24	6	-	-	-	-	24	6
B36	2013	Betri deildin menn	25	2	1	0	-		26	2
B36	Total		25	2	1	0	-	-	26	2
AaB	2013-14	Danish Superliga	-		1	0	-		1	0
AaB	2014-15	Danish Superliga	9	0	-		-		9	0
AaB	2015-16	Danish Superliga	11	0	3	1	-		14	1
AaB	2016-17	Danish Superliga	3	0	-		-		3	0
AaB	Total		23	0	4	1	-	-	27	1
Brann	2016	Tippeligaen	7	1	-		-		7	1
Brann	2017	Eliteserien	25	4	3	0	2	0	31	4
Brann	2018	Eliteserien	28	4	3	0	-		31	4
Brann	2019	Eliteserien	24	1	3	0	2	0	29	1
Brann	2020	Eliteserien	13	0	0	0	-		13	0
Brann	Total		97	10	9	0	4	0	105	10
Odd	2021	Eliteserien	20	1	3	1	-		23	2
Odd	2022	Eliteserien	8	0	2	1	-		10	1
Odd	Total		28	1	5	2	0	0	33	3
TB	2023	Betri deildin menn	12	0	0	0	-		12	0
TB	Total		12	0	1	0	-	-	12	0
Career total			197	19	19	3	4	0	220	22

=== International goals ===
Scores and results list the Faroe Islands' goal tally first.

No	Date	Venue	Opponent	Score	Result	Competition
1.	3 September 2017	Tórsvøllur, Tórshavn, Faroe Islands	Andorra	1–0	1–0	2018 FIFA World Cup qualification

== Honours ==
AaB

- Danish Superliga: 2013–14
- Danish Cup: 2013–14
