= Ole Enersen =

Norwegian footballer (born 2002)

Personal information
- Full name: Ole Kristian Bergem Enersen
- Date of birth: 6 September 2002 (age 24)
- Height: 1.81 m (5 ft 11 in)
- Position: Midfielder

Team information
- Current team: Strømsgodset
- Number: 14

Youth career
- –2015: Åssiden
- 2016–2020: Strømsgodset

Senior career*
Years	Team	Apps	(Gls)
2021–	Strømsgodset	85	(3)

International career
2021	Norway U20	2	(0)
2023	Norway U21	1	(0)
- * Club domestic league appearances and goals as of 14 November 2026

Ole Enersen (born 6 September 2002) is a Norwegian football midfielder who plays for Strømsgodset.

He started his youth career in Åssiden IF, switching to Strømsgodset IF in 2016. He signed for the senior team in March 2021 and made his Eliteserien debut in May 2021 against Kristiansund. He scored his first goal in June 2022 against Sarpsborg 08.
