= Markus André Kaasa =

Norwegian footballer (born 1997)

Personal information
- Date of birth: 15 July 1997 (age 29)
- Place of birth: Norway
- Height: 1.75 m (5 ft 9 in)
- Position: Midfielder

Team information
- Current team: AaB
- Number: 23

Youth career
- Odd

Senior career*
Years	Team	Apps	(Gls)
2016–2021	Odd	100	(6)
2018–2019	Odd II	15	(5)
2022–2025	Molde	73	(13)
2025–	AaB	18	(1)
- * Club domestic league appearances and goals as of 4 August 2026

Markus André Kaasa (born 15 July 1997) is a Norwegian professional footballer who plays as a midfielder for Danish 1st Division club AaB.

== Career statistics ==
As of 4 August 2026

Club	Season	Division	League		Cup		Europe		Total	
Club	Season	Division	Apps	Goals	Apps	Goals	Apps	Goals	Apps	Goals
Odd	2017	Eliteserien	1	0	1	0	—		2	0
Odd	2018	Eliteserien	18	1	4	0	—		22	1
Odd	2019	Eliteserien	22	2	4	0	—		26	2
Odd	2020	Eliteserien	29	2	—		—		29	2
Odd	2021	Eliteserien	30	2	2	0	—		32	2
Odd	Total		100	7	11	0	—		111	7
Molde	2022	Eliteserien	25	9	7	0	8 (Note: Appearances in UEFA Europa Conference League)	2	40	11
Molde	2023	Eliteserien	18	0	4	0	11 (Note: Six appearances in UEFA Champions League, and five appearances in UEFA Europa League)	0	33	0
Molde	2024	Eliteserien	19	2	3	0	12	3	34	5
Molde	2025	Eliteserien	11	2	0	0	0	0	11	2
Molde	Total		73	13	14	0	31	5	118	18
AaB	2025–26	Danish 1st Division	16	0	1	0	0	0	17	0
AaB	2026–27	Danish 1st Division	2	1	0	0	0	0	2	1
AaB	Total		18	1	1	0	0	0	19	1
Career Total			191	21	26	0	31	5	248	26

== Honours ==
Molde

- Eliteserien: 2022
- Norwegian Cup: 2021–22, 2023

Individual

- Eliteserien Player of the Month: September 2022
