= Jonas Therkelsen =

Norwegian footballer (born 2003)

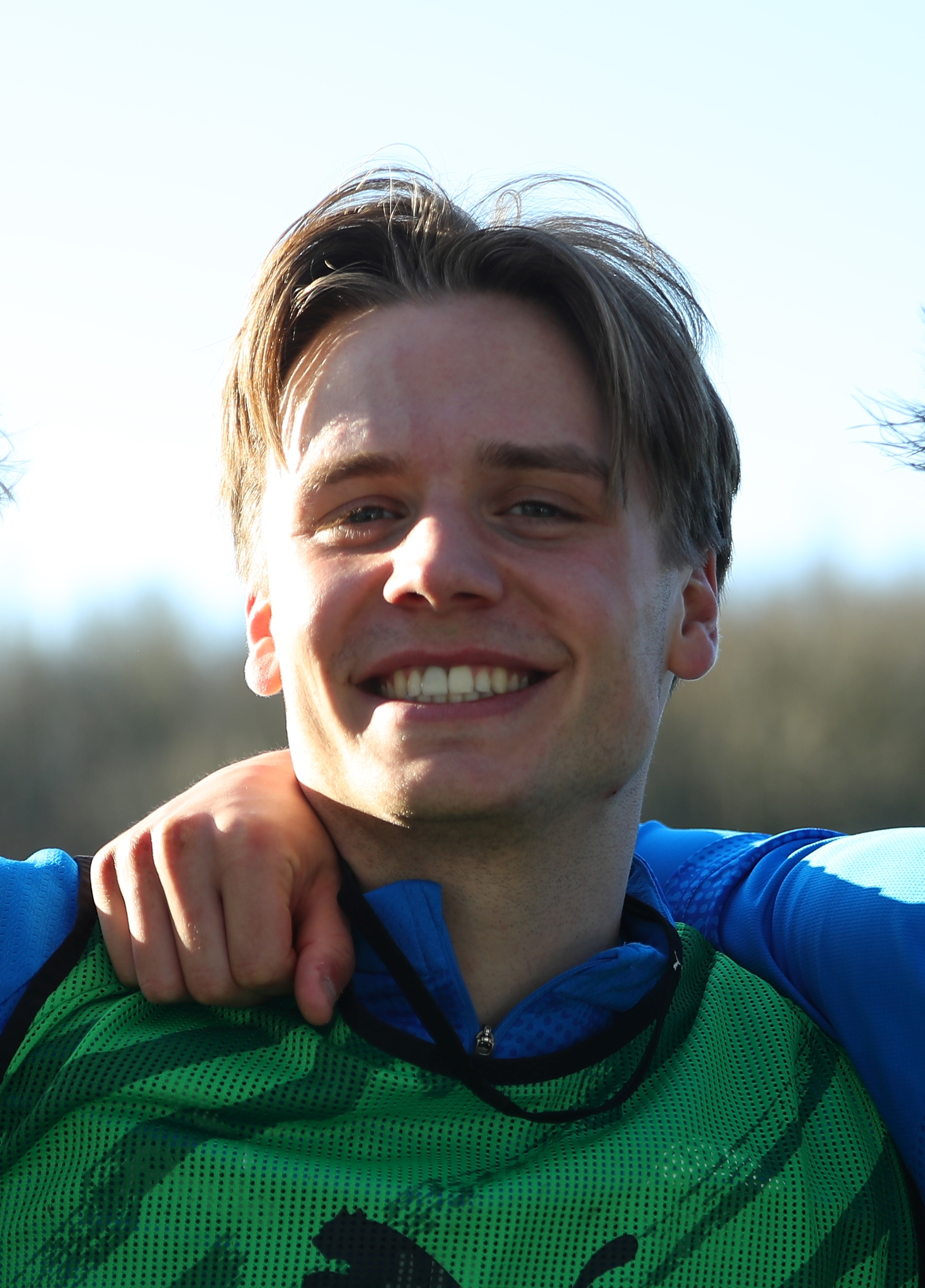
- Therkelsen in 2026

Personal information
- Full name: Jonas Torrissen Therkelsen
- Date of birth: 5 May 2003 (age 23)
- Height: 1.84 m (6 ft 0 in)
- Position: Midfielder

Team information
- Current team: Holstein Kiel
- Number: 10

Youth career
- –2014: Jutul
- 2014–2017: Fornebu
- 2017–2018: Stabæk
- 2019–2022: Strømsgodset

Senior career*
Years	Team	Apps	(Gls)
2022–2025	Strømsgodset	63	(7)
2025–	Holstein Kiel	34	(4)

International career^{‡}
2022–2023	Norway U20	6	(0)
2024–	Norway U21	2	(0)
- * Club domestic league appearances and goals as of 18 May 2026 ‡ National team caps and goals as of 10 January 2025

Jonas Torrissen Therkelsen (born 5 May 2003) is a Norwegian professional footballer who plays as a midfielder for German 2. Bundesliga club Holstein Kiel. He is a Norway youth international.

== Club career ==
Having played youth football for Fornebu, Stabæk and Strømsgodset, he made his debut in the Eliteserien for Strømsgodset on 1 October 2022 away against Vålerenga, appearing as a second-half substitute. He signed his first professional contract a week later. He made his first league start for the club against FK Bodo/Glimt on 13 November 2022.

In 2023, he signed a new and improved three-year contract with the club. Over the course of the 2023 and 2024 seasons he made more than 60 senior appearances for Strømsgodset, with his usage coming primarily as a central midfielder, but having also on occasion played up front or out wide for the club. In September 2024, he signed a new three-year contract with the club.

In June 2025, Therkelsen moved to Holstein Kiel in German 2. Bundesliga on a four-year contract.

== International career ==
Therkelsen made his debut for Norway U20 against Germany U20 in November 2022.
