= Emmanuel Danso =

Ghanaian association football player

Personal information
- Date of birth: 10 November 2000 (age 25)
- Place of birth: Accra, Ghana
- Height: 1.75 m (5 ft 9 in)
- Position: Midfielder

Team information
- Current team: Livingston
- Number: 20

Youth career
- –2019: SC Accra
- 2019–2022: Lyon

Senior career*
| Years | Team | Apps | (Gls) |
| 2019–2022 | Lyon II | 12 | (0) |
| 2022–2024 | Strømsgodset | 24 | (0) |
| 2022–2024 | Strømsgodset 2 | 19 | (0) |
| 2025 | Stabæk | 24 | (0) |
| 2026– | Livingston | 13 | (0) |
- * Club domestic league appearances and goals as of 20 May 2026

Emmanuel Danso (born 10 November 2000) is a Ghanaian professional footballer who plays as a central midfielder for Livingston.

== Career ==
In February 2019, Danso joined French club Olympique Lyonnais from Ghanaian lower-tier side SC Accra. In August 2022, he joined Norwegian club Stromsgodset signing a two-and-a-half-year contract. He made his professional debut with Strømsgodset in a 6–0 Eliteserien win over Jerv on 21 August 2022, as a second-half substitute for Johan Hove.

Having fulfilled a one-year contract with Stabæk, Danso was linked with a move to Scottish side Livingston in December 2025. The move was finalized on 24 December, effective from 1 January 2026, on a contract lasting until June 2029.
