= 2021 Viking FK season =

Viking FK 2021 football season

Viking
2021 season
- Chair: Stig Christiansen
- Manager(s): Bjarte Lunde Aarsheim; Morten Jensen
- Stadium: Viking Stadion
- Eliteserien: 3rd
- Norwegian Cup: Fourth round
- Top goalscorer: League: Veton Berisha (22); All: Veton Berisha (24)
- Highest home attendance: 14,105 vs Sandefjord (2 October)
- Average home league attendance: 6,041
Home colours	Away colours
- All statistics correct as of 12 December 2021.

The 2021 season was Viking's 3rd consecutive year in Eliteserien, and their 71st season in the top flight of Norwegian football. The club participated in the Eliteserien and the Norwegian Cup. It was the club's first season with Bjarte Lunde Aarsheim and Morten Jensen as managers. Viking ended the Eliteserien season in 3rd place, the club's first top-three finish since 2007.

== Season events ==
=== Pre-season ===
Bjarne Berntsen left his position as manager after the 2020 season, being replaced by Bjarte Lunde Aarsheim and Morten Jensen, who took over as joint managers on 1 January 2021.

In March 2021, Stig Christiansen was reinstated as chairman of the club, a position he also held between 2017 and 2020.

On 11 March 2021, the 2021 Eliteserien season, that was due to start on 5 April, was postponed by one month due to the COVID-19 pandemic in Norway. On 31 March, the new start date for the league was announced to be 8 May 2021.

On 15 March, Viking confirmed the signing of forward Mai Traore from Vasalunds IF. Traore joined the team on 2 August 2021. Viking also signed winger Kevin Kabran and left-back Shayne Pattynama ahead of the season. On 7 May 2021, fan favourite Zlatko Tripić returned to the club, after one year with Turkish side Göztepe.

=== May ===
Viking started the Eliteserien season with a 3–1 home win against Brann on 9 May 2021, before losing 5–0 to Rosenborg at Lerkendal Stadion four days later. The bad result against Rosenborg was followed by another loss, this time against newly promoted Tromsø on 16 May 2021. Viking lost the match 1–0. Viking managed to bounce back in the next game, winning 3–1 away from home against Lillestrøm, in a game where Zlatko Tripić scored his first goal after his return to the club. The next match also resulted in a victory, 2–1 over Mjøndalen on 27 May 2021. Three days later, Viking travelled to Rogaland rivals Haugesund with confidence after two back-to-back wins, but the winning streak came to an end, as Haugesund won the match 4–2.

=== June ===
Viking returned to winning ways in the following game, defeating Vålerenga 4–1 on 13 June 2021. Veton Berisha played a central role in the victory, scoring two of the goals and providing two assists. Viking then suffered a 3–0 loss to 16th-placed Sandefjord on 19 June 2021, before defeating Sarpsborg 08 2–1 six days later. The following game resulted in the club's first draw of the season, 3–3 at home to Stabæk on 30 June 2021.

=== July ===
Three days later, Viking drew 2–2 against reigning league champions Bodø/Glimt at Aspmyra Stadion. Veton Berisha scored both of the goals for Viking. On 10 July 2021, Viking drew their third game in a row, 1–1 against Strømsgodset, after a late equalizer by Zlatko Tripić. One week later, Viking lost 3–2 away to Odd. The goalscorers for Viking were Harald Nilsen Tangen and Veton Berisha. On 25 July 2021, Viking won 3–2 against Staal Jørpeland in the first round of the 2021 Norwegian Cup. Former Viking player Even Østensen scored the goals for Staal Jørpeland.

=== August ===
On 1 August 2021, Viking defeated Djerv 1919 2–0 in the second round of the Norwegian Cup. Veton Berisha scored a brace which secured the victory for Viking. On 8 August 2021, Viking won 3–2 against Kristiansund. Two of the goals were scored by Zlatko Tripić, while Sebastian Sebulonsen scored one goal. The next day, Viking confirmed the signing of Gianni Stensness from Australian club Central Coast Mariners. On 11 August, Viking signed David Brekalo from Slovenian club Bravo. On 15 August, Viking won 3–2 against top-of-the-league Molde. Viking were 2–0 down after the first half, but managed to turn it around in the second half, after goals from Kevin Kabran, Zlatko Tripić and David Brekalo. Viking drew the next game 1–1 against Vålerenga in Oslo, before defeating Rosenborg 2–1 at home on 29 August. The next day, Viking confirmed the signing of Patrik Gunnarsson on loan from Brentford. The same day, Henrik Heggheim was sold to Danish club Brøndby.

=== September ===
Following four unbeaten league games in August, Viking continued their unbeaten run on 11 September, beating Stabæk 3–1 at Nadderud Stadion. Viking's unbeaten run came to an end eight days later, after losing 3–1 to Bodø/Glimt. The third round of the cup was played on 22 September against Rosenborg. The match ended 3–1 in favour of Viking. The following fixture resulted in a 2–2 draw to Molde on 26 September — the first time Viking managed to get a point at Aker Stadion in five years.

=== October ===
On 2 October, Viking defeated Sandefjord 2–1 in front of 14,105 spectators. Viking had to play the majority of the match with ten men, after goalkeeper Patrik Gunnarsson received a red card after 18 minutes. Viking followed up the Sandefjord win with another three points, this time against Strømsgodset at Marienlyst Stadion. Kristoffer Løkberg scored the only goal of the game. On 23 October, Viking won 5–1 against Lillestrøm. Veton Berisha scored a hat-trick, while Harald Nilsen Tangen and Sebastian Sebulonsen scored one each. The following game resulted in a 2–0 win away to Brann at Brann Stadion, a game that was characterised by heavy rain and bad playing conditions. October was concluded with a 2–1 loss at home to Sarpsborg 08, ending a streak of four wins in a row.

=== November ===
The first match in November was against Mjøndalen on 7 November. Viking won 1–0 after Veton Berisha converted a penalty in added time. On 20 November, Viking drew 1–1 at home to Haugesund. Veton Berisha scored Viking's goal, his 20th league goal of the season. Viking won the next match 3–2 against Kristiansund on 28 November. Two late goals from Veton Berisha and Sondre Bjørshol gave Viking the win.

=== December ===
The last home match of the season was against Odd on 5 December. Viking won 3–1 and secured a top-three finish in the league for the first time since 2007. The Eliteserien season was concluded with a 2–0 win against Tromsø on 12 December. Viking received their bronze medals after the match. Third place also granted the club a spot in the qualification stage of the 2022–23 UEFA Europa Conference League.

== Squad ==
As of 19 September 2021

Note: Flags indicate national team as defined under FIFA eligibility rules; some limited exceptions apply. Players may hold more than one non-FIFA nationality.

No.	Pos.	Nation	Player
1	GK	NOR	Iven Austbø
3	DF	NOR	Viljar Vevatne (vice-captain)
4	DF	SLO	David Brekalo
6	MF	AUS	Gianni Stensness
7	MF	NOR	Fredrik Torsteinbø
8	MF	NZL	Joe Bell
9	FW	SWE	Kevin Kabran
10	FW	NOR	Tommy Høiland
11	FW	NOR	Yann-Erik de Lanlay
12	GK	NOR	Trym Sølvberg Ur
13	GK	NOR	Magnus Rugland Ree
14	FW	NOR	Veton Berisha (captain)
15	MF	NOR	Johnny Furdal
16	MF	NOR	Kristoffer Løkberg

No.	Pos.	Nation	Player
17	MF	NOR	Sebastian Sebulonsen
18	DF	NOR	Sondre Bjørshol
20	DF	NED	Shayne Pattynama
21	MF	NOR	Harald Nilsen Tangen
22	GK	NOR	Arild Østbø
23	DF	NOR	Rolf Daniel Vikstøl
24	FW	GUI	Mai Traore
25	DF	NOR	Sebastian Sørlie Henriksen
27	MF	ISL	Samúel Friðjónsson
30	GK	ISL	Patrik Gunnarsson (on loan from Brentford)
34	DF	NOR	Kristoffer Forgaard Paulsen
40	FW	NOR	Simen Kvia-Egeskog
41	MF	NOR	Heine Åsen Larsen
77	FW	NOR	Zlatko Tripić

=== Out on loan ===
Note: Flags indicate national team as defined under FIFA eligibility rules; some limited exceptions apply. Players may hold more than one non-FIFA nationality.

No.	Pos.	Nation	Player
2	DF	NOR	Herman Haugen (at Raufoss)
19	MF	NOR	Sondre Auklend (at Åsane)

No.	Pos.	Nation	Player
33	DF	NOR	Vebjørn Hagen (at Hødd)
35	MF	NOR	Lars Erik Sødal (at Egersund)

== Transfers ==
=== Transfers in ===
Date	Pos.	Name	From	Fee	Ref.
22 January 2021	FW	(Sweden) Kevin Kabran	Start	Undisclosed	
16 March 2021	DF	(Netherlands) Shayne Pattynama	(Netherlands) Telstar	Undisclosed	
17 March 2021	DF	(Norway) Vebjørn Hagen	Promoted from junior squad		
7 May 2021	FW	(Norway) Zlatko Tripić	(Turkey) Göztepe	Free transfer	
29 June 2021	FW	(Norway) Simen Kvia-Egeskog	Promoted from junior squad		
2 August 2021	FW	(Guinea) Mai Traore	(Sweden) Vasalund	Undisclosed	
9 August 2021	MF	(New Zealand) Gianni Stensness	(Australia) Central Coast Mariners	Undisclosed	
11 August 2021	DF	(Slovenia) David Brekalo	(Slovenia) Bravo	Undisclosed	

=== Transfers out ===
Date	Pos.	Name	To	Fee	Ref.
1 January 2021	GK	(Wales) Michael Crowe	Released		
1 January 2021	MF	(Kosovo) Zymer Bytyqi	Released (Note: Joined Konyaspor on 8 January 2021.)		
1 January 2021	FW	(Norway) Jefferson de Souza	Released (Note: Joined Egersund on 11 March 2021.)		
1 January 2021	FW	(Kosovo) Ylldren Ibrahimaj	Released (Note: Joined Ural Yekaterinburg on 16 January 2021.)		
1 January 2021	FW	(Norway) Even Østensen	Released (Note: Joined Staal Jørpeland on 23 February 2021.)		
8 February 2021	DF	(Iceland) Axel Óskar Andrésson	(Latvia) Riga FC	Undisclosed	
1 August 2021	DF	(Norway) Tord Salte	Sogndal	Free transfer	
26 August 2021	DF	(Norway) Runar Hove	Brann	Undisclosed	
30 August 2021	DF	(Norway) Henrik Heggheim	(Denmark) Brøndby	Undisclosed	

=== Loans in ===
Start date	Pos.	Name	From	End date	Ref.
30 August 2021	GK	(Iceland) Patrik Gunnarsson	(England) Brentford	End of season	

=== Loans out ===
Start date	Pos.	Name	To	End date	Ref.
12 May 2021	MF	(Norway) Sebastian Sebulonsen	Mjøndalen	9 June 2021	
19 May 2021	DF	(Norway) Vebjørn Hagen	Hødd	End of season	
4 June 2021	DF	(Norway) Tord Salte	Sogndal	31 July 2021	
9 August 2021	MF	(Norway) Sondre Auklend	Åsane	End of season	
10 August 2021	MF	(Norway) Lars Erik Sødal	Egersund	End of season	
31 August 2021	DF	(Norway) Herman Haugen	Raufoss	End of season	

== Friendlies ==
=== Pre-season ===
The following four friendly matches were announced on 6 April.

17 April 2021 Friendly	Viking	1–1	Åsane	Stavanger, Norway
16:00 CEST (UTC+2)	Friðjónsson 22'	Report	Lorentzen 13'	Stadium: Viking Stadion; Attendance: 0 Referee: Daniel Higraff

21 April 2021 Friendly	Sandnes Ulf	1–1	Viking	Sandnes, Norway
18:00 CEST (UTC+2)	Grødem 52'	Report	Kabran 62'	Stadium: Øster Hus Arena; Attendance: 0 Referee: Mischa Kellerhals

25 April 2021 Friendly	Viking	3–3	Start	Stavanger, Norway
15:00 CEST (UTC+2)	Kabran 15'; Berisha 30'; Friðjónsson 56'	Report	Ramsland 5', 87'; Schulze 7'	Stadium: Viking Stadion; Attendance: 0 Referee: Kai Erik Steen

2 May 2021 Friendly	Viking	4–0	Haugesund	Stavanger, Norway
18:00 CEST (UTC+2)	Friðjónsson 18'; Berisha 53', 59'; Haugen 89'	Report		Stadium: Viking Stadion; Attendance: 0 Referee: Svein Oddvar Moen

=== Mid-season ===
9 June 2021 Friendly	Viking	0–2	Egersund	Stavanger, Norway
13:00 CEST (UTC+2)		Report	Johannesen 2'; Dang 34'	Stadium: Viking Stadion; Referee: Ola Kellerhals

== Competitions ==
=== Eliteserien ===
==== Table ====
Pos	Team	Pld	W	D	L	GF	GA	GD	Pts	Qualification or relegation
1	Bodø/Glimt (C)	30	18	9	3	59	25	+34	63	Qualification for the Champions League first qualifying round
2	Molde	30	18	6	6	70	40	+30	60	Qualification for the Europa Conference League second qualifying round (Note: Since the winners of the 2021 Norwegian Cup, Molde, have already qualified for European competitions based on league position, the last European spot was passed down to the fourth placed team, Lillestrøm.)
3	Viking	30	17	6	7	60	47	+13	57	Qualification for the Europa Conference League second qualifying round
4	Lillestrøm	30	14	7	9	49	40	+9	49	Qualification for the Europa Conference League second qualifying round
5	Rosenborg	30	13	9	8	58	42	+16	48	

Source: Football Association of Norway (in Norwegian)
Rules for classification: 1) Points; 2) Goal difference; 3) Goals scored; 4) Head-to-head points; 5) Head-to-head goal difference; 6) Head-to-head away goals scored (only if between two teams); 7) Head-to-head goals scored; 8) Play-off (only used to decide champions or relegation).
(C) Champions

==== Results summary ====
Overall								Home						Away					
Pld	W	D	L	GF	GA	GD	Pts	W	D	L	GF	GA	GD	W	D	L	GF	GA	GD
30	17	6	7	60	47	+13	57	9	3	3	34	22	+12	8	3	4	26	25	+1

Source: see below

==== Results by round ====
Round	1	2	3	4	5	6	7	8	9	10	11	12	13	14	15	16	17	18	19	20	21	22	23	24	25	26	27	28	29	30
Ground	H	A	H	A	H	A	H	A	A	H	A	H	A	H	H	A	H	A	H	A	H	A	H	A	H	A	H	A	H	A
Result	W	L	L	W	W	L	W	L	W	D	D	D	L	W	W	D	W	W	L	D	W	W	W	W	L	W	D	W	W	W
Position	3	10	13	7	4	8	4	7	7	7	7	8	10	8	6	6	6	6	6	6	5	5	4	3	3	3	3	3	3	3

Source: NIFS
A = Away; H = Home; W = Win; D = Draw; L = Loss

==== Matches ====
The Eliteserien fixtures were announced on 1 April.

9 May 2021 1	Viking	3–1	Brann	Stavanger
18:00 CEST (UTC+2)	Friðjónsson 19'; Berisha 66'; Blomberg 81' (o.g.)	Report	Bamba 42'	Stadium: Viking Stadion; Attendance: 600; Referee: Espen Eskås

13 May 2021 2	Rosenborg	5–0	Viking	Trondheim
20:00 CEST (UTC+2)	Henriksen 25'; Vecchia 45+5'; Eyjólfsson 58'; Zachariassen 71'; Molins 74'	Report		Stadium: Lerkendal Stadion; Attendance: 600; Referee: Kristoffer Hagenes

16 May 2021 3	Viking	0–1	Tromsø	Stavanger
15:00 CEST (UTC+2)		Report	Totland 53'	Stadium: Viking Stadion; Attendance: 600; Referee: Marius Hansen Grøtta

24 May 2021 4	Lillestrøm	1–3	Viking	Lillestrøm
18:00 CEST (UTC+2)	Brunes 90+4'	Report	Tripić 23'; Vikstøl 40'; Friðjónsson 83'	Stadium: Åråsen Stadion; Attendance: 0 Referee: Rohit Saggi

27 May 2021 5	Viking	2–1	Mjøndalen	Stavanger
18:00 CEST (UTC+2)	Tangen 54'; Tripić 81'	Report	Stokke 43'	Stadium: Viking Stadion; Attendance: 600; Referee: Tore Hansen

30 May 2021 6	Haugesund	4–2	Viking	Haugesund
20:00 CEST (UTC+2)	Velde 24', 60'; Wadji 64'; Ndour 90+1'	Report	Berisha 38' (pen.), 90+5'	Stadium: Haugesund Stadion; Attendance: 600; Referee: Rohit Saggi

13 June 2021 7	Viking	4–1	Vålerenga	Stavanger
20:00 CEST (UTC+2)	Berisha 45+3', 57' (pen.); Friðjónsson 73'; Pattynama 90'	Report	Udahl 35'	Stadium: Viking Stadion; Attendance: 600; Referee: Tore Hansen

19 June 2021 8	Sandefjord	3–0	Viking	Sandefjord
15:00 CEST (UTC+2)	Jónsson 35'; Hansen 58'; Gussiås 90+4'	Report		Stadium: Sandefjord Arena; Attendance: 600; Referee: Ola Hobber Nilsen

25 June 2021 9	Sarpsborg 08	1–2	Viking	Sarpsborg
18:00 CEST (UTC+2)	Koné 38'	Report	Kabran 56'; Tangen 84'	Stadium: Sarpsborg Stadion; Attendance: 2,000; Referee: Tom Harald Hagen

30 June 2021 10	Viking	3–3	Stabæk	Stavanger
18:00 CEST (UTC+2)	Berisha 30' (pen.), 48' de Lanlay 83'	Report	Nusa 26', 67'; Geelmuyden 61'	Stadium: Viking Stadion; Attendance: 3,059; Referee: Marius Hansen Grøtta

3 July 2021 11	Bodø/Glimt	2–2	Viking	Bodø
15:00 CEST (UTC+2)	Berg 43' (pen.), 60'	Report	Berisha 45', 56'	Stadium: Aspmyra Stadion; Attendance: 2,000; Referee: Dag Vidar Hafsås

10 July 2021 12	Viking	1–1	Strømsgodset	Stavanger
18:00 CEST (UTC+2)	Tripić 90'	Report	Jack 13'	Stadium: Viking Stadion; Attendance: 5,134; Referee: Sigurd Smehus Kringstad

17 July 2021 13	Odd	3–2	Viking	Skien
18:00 CEST (UTC+2)	Kaasa 45+2'; Bakenga 46', 68' (pen.)	Report	Tangen 60'; Berisha 73'	Stadium: Skagerak Arena; Attendance: 1,607; Referee: Rohit Saggi

8 August 2021 14	Viking	3–2	Kristiansund	Stavanger
18:00 CEST (UTC+2)	Tripić 9', 80'; Sebulonsen 16'	Report	Nilsen 35'; Bye 88'	Stadium: Viking Stadion; Attendance: 3,511; Referee: Espen Eskås

15 August 2021 15	Viking	3–2	Molde	Stavanger
18:00 CEST (UTC+2)	Kabran 66'; Tripić 72' (pen.); Brekalo 90+1'	Report	Risa 26'; Andersen 39'	Stadium: Viking Stadion; Attendance: 3,704; Referee: Tom Harald Hagen

22 August 2021 16	Vålerenga	1–1	Viking	Oslo
18:00 CEST (UTC+2)	Kjartansson 11'	Report	Tangen 84'	Stadium: Intility Arena; Attendance: 5,184; Referee: Tore Hansen

29 August 2021 17	Viking	2–1	Rosenborg	Stavanger
18:00 CEST (UTC+2)	Bell 54'; Tripić 64'	Report	Skarsem 45+3'	Stadium: Viking Stadion; Attendance: 6,151; Referee: Mohammad Usman Aslam

11 September 2021 18	Stabæk	1–3	Viking	Bærum
18:00 CEST (UTC+2)	Azemi 15'	Report	Berisha 10', 72'; Vevatne 67'	Stadium: Nadderud Stadion; Attendance: 2,000; Referee: Tommy Skjerven

19 September 2021 19	Viking	1–3	Bodø/Glimt	Stavanger
18:00 CEST (UTC+2)	Berisha 6'	Report	Moe 67'; Pellegrino 76'; Botheim 90+3'	Stadium: Viking Stadion; Attendance: 6,789; Referee: Espen Eskås

26 September 2021 20	Molde	2–2	Viking	Molde
18:00 CEST (UTC+2)	Andersen 34'; Omoijuanfo 71'	Report	Friðjónsson 70'; Pattynama 72'	Stadium: Aker Stadion; Attendance: 3,134; Referee: Tore Hansen

2 October 2021 21	Viking	2–1	Sandefjord	Stavanger
18:00 CEST (UTC+2)	Berisha 49', 77'	Report	Kreuzriegler 57'	Stadium: Viking Stadion; Attendance: 14,105; Referee: Kristoffer Hagenes

17 October 2021 22	Strømsgodset	0–1	Viking	Drammen
17:00 CEST (UTC+2)		Report	Løkberg 29'	Stadium: Marienlyst Stadion; Attendance: 6,404; Referee: Kai Erik Steen

23 October 2021 23	Viking	5–1	Lillestrøm	Stavanger
16:00 CEST (UTC+2)	Sebulonsen 3'; Tangen 48'; Berisha 68', 73', 82'	Report	Krogstad 64'	Stadium: Viking Stadion; Attendance: 11,026; Referee: Tom Harald Hagen

28 October 2021 24	Brann	0–2	Viking	Bergen
18:00 CEST (UTC+2)		Report	Sebulonsen 20'; Kabran 64'	Stadium: Brann Stadion; Attendance: 8,421; Referee: Rohit Saggi

31 October 2021 25	Viking	1–2	Sarpsborg 08	Stavanger
18:00 CET (UTC+1)	Stensness 40'	Report	Salétros 35'; Thomassen 59'	Stadium: Viking Stadion; Attendance: 7,508; Referee: Kai Erik Steen

7 November 2021 26	Mjøndalen	0–1	Viking	Mjøndalen
17:00 CET (UTC+1)		Report	Berisha 90+2' (pen.)	Stadium: Consto Arena; Attendance: 1,847; Referee: Sigurd Smehus Kringstad

20 November 2021 27	Viking	1–1	Haugesund	Stavanger
18:00 CET (UTC+1)	Berisha 58'	Report	Velde 63' (pen.)	Stadium: Viking Stadion; Attendance: 13,126; Referee: Espen Eskås

28 November 2021 28	Kristiansund	2–3	Viking	Kristiansund
17:00 CET (UTC+1)	Bye 3'; Gjertsen 65'	Report	Løkberg 40'; Berisha 87' (pen.); Bjørshol 90+2'	Stadium: Kristiansund Stadion; Attendance: 3,914; Referee: Kristoffer Hagenes

5 December 2021 29	Viking	3–1	Odd	Stavanger
17:00 CET (UTC+1)	Sebulonsen 45'; Berisha 58' (pen.); Friðjónsson 75'	Report	Jørgensen 2'	Stadium: Viking Stadion; Attendance: 14,103; Referee: Sivert Amland

12 December 2021 30	Tromsø	0–2	Viking	Tromsø
17:00 CET (UTC+1)		Report	Løkberg 38'; Brekalo 47'	Stadium: Alfheim Stadion; Attendance: 2,412; Referee: Mohammad Usman Aslam

=== Norwegian Cup ===
The pair-ups for the first round were announced on 25 June 2021. The pair-ups for the second round were announced on 26 July 2021. The draw for the third round was held on 5 August 2021. In the fourth round, Viking played against Kongsvinger. The match was played in the 2022 season.

25 July 2021 First round	Staal Jørpeland	2–3	Viking	Jørpeland
18:00 CEST (UTC+2)	Østensen 56' (pen.), 83'	Report	Friðjónsson 25'; Vikstøl 59'; Sebulonsen 85'	Stadium: Jørpeland Stadion; Attendance: 800; Referee: Ola Kellerhals

1 August 2021 Second round	Djerv 1919	0–2	Viking	Haugesund
16:00 CEST (UTC+2)		Report	Berisha 36', 73' (pen.)	Stadium: Djervbanen; Attendance: 500; Referee: Daniel Higraff

22 September 2021 Third round	Viking	3–1	Rosenborg	Stavanger
20:10 CEST (UTC+2)	Løkberg 33' de Lanlay 50'; Tripić 79'	Report	Holse 61'	Stadium: Viking Stadion; Attendance: 4,511; Referee: Rohit Saggi

== Squad statistics ==
As of match played 12 December 2021

=== Appearances and goals ===
No.	Pos	Nat	Player	Total		Eliteserien		Norwegian Cup	
No.	Pos	Nat	Player	Apps	Goals	Apps	Goals	Apps	Goals
1	GK	(Norway) NOR	Iven Austbø	10	0	10	0	0	0
2	DF	(Norway) NOR	Herman Haugen	12	0	10	0	2	0
3	DF	(Norway) NOR	Viljar Vevatne	32	1	29	1	3	0
4	DF	(Slovenia) SLO	David Brekalo	11	2	11	2	0	0
6	MF	(Australia) AUS	Gianni Stensness	15	1	14	1	1	0
7	MF	(Norway) NOR	Fredrik Torsteinbø	10	0	10	0	0	0
8	MF	(New Zealand) NZL	Joe Bell	28	1	27	1	1	0
9	FW	(Sweden) SWE	Kevin Kabran	30	3	28	3	2	0
10	FW	(Norway) NOR	Tommy Høiland	9	0	8	0	1	0
11	FW	(Norway) NOR	Yann-Erik de Lanlay	21	2	20	1	1	1
14	FW	(Norway) NOR	Veton Berisha	31	24	28	22	3	2
16	MF	(Norway) NOR	Kristoffer Løkberg	24	4	21	3	3	1
17	MF	(Norway) NOR	Sebastian Sebulonsen	27	5	24	4	3	1
18	DF	(Norway) NOR	Sondre Bjørshol	13	1	13	1	0	0
19	MF	(Norway) NOR	Sondre Auklend	11	0	9	0	2	0
20	DF	(Netherlands) NED	Shayne Pattynama	26	2	24	2	2	0
21	MF	(Norway) NOR	Harald Nilsen Tangen	30	5	27	5	3	0
22	GK	(Norway) NOR	Arild Østbø	16	0	14	0	2	0
23	DF	(Norway) NOR	Rolf Daniel Vikstøl	25	2	22	1	3	1
24	FW	(Guinea) GUI	Mai Traore	11	0	10	0	1	0
25	DF	(Norway) NOR	Sebastian Sørlie Henriksen	1	0	1	0	0	0
27	MF	(Iceland) ISL	Samúel Friðjónsson	28	6	25	5	3	1
30	GK	(Iceland) ISL	Patrik Gunnarsson	8	0	7	0	1	0
34	DF	(Norway) NOR	Kristoffer Forgaard Paulsen	2	0	1	0	1	0
35	MF	(Norway) NOR	Lars Erik Sødal	2	0	0	0	2	0
40	FW	(Norway) NOR	Simen Kvia-Egeskog	14	0	12	0	2	0
41	MF	(Norway) NOR	Heine Åsen Larsen	1	0	1	0	0	0
77	FW	(Norway) NOR	Zlatko Tripić	25	8	23	7	2	1
Players who left Viking during the season:
5	DF	(Norway) NOR	Henrik Heggheim	19	0	17	0	2	0
6	DF	(Norway) NOR	Runar Hove	14	0	14	0	0	0
