= 2023 Viking FK season =

Viking FK 2023 football season

Viking
2023 season
- Chair: Stig Christiansen
- Manager(s): Bjarte Lunde Aarsheim; Morten Jensen
- Stadium: Viking Stadion
- Eliteserien: 4th
- 2022 Norwegian Cup: Quarter-final
- 2023 Norwegian Cup: Fourth round
- Top goalscorer: League: Zlatko Tripić (13 goals); All: Zlatko Tripić (15 goals)
- Highest home attendance: 15,900 vs Odd (16 May)
- Lowest home attendance: 5,433 vs Rosenborg (12 March)
- Average home league attendance: 12,923
Home colours	Away colours
- All statistics correct as of 3 December 2023.

The 2023 season was Viking's 5th consecutive year in the Eliteserien, and their 73rd season in the top flight of Norwegian football. The club participated in the Eliteserien, the 2022 Norwegian Football Cup and the 2023 Norwegian Football Cup. It was the club's third season with Bjarte Lunde Aarsheim and Morten Jensen as managers.

== Transfers ==
=== Transfers in ===
Date	Pos.	Name	From	Fee	Ref.
1 January 2023	DF	(Slovenia) Jošt Urbančič	(Slovenia) Gorica	Undisclosed	
23 January 2023	FW	(Australia) Nicholas D'Agostino	(Australia) Melbourne Victory	Undisclosed	
2 February 2023	MF	(Australia) Patrick Yazbek	(Australia) Sydney FC	Undisclosed	
7 March 2023	FW	(Norway) Lars-Jørgen Salvesen	Bodø/Glimt	Undisclosed	
31 March 2023	MF	(Iceland) Birkir Bjarnason	(Turkey) Adana Demirspor	Free transfer	
24 July 2023	DF	(Norway) Sondre Langås	Ranheim	Undisclosed	
29 August 2023	MF	(New Zealand) Joe Bell	(Denmark) Brøndby	Undisclosed	

=== Transfers out ===
Date	Pos.	Name	To	Fee	Ref.
1 January 2023	DF	(Norway) Rolf Daniel Vikstøl	Unattached	Free transfer	
1 January 2023	DF	(Norway) Sebastian Sørlie Henriksen	Grorud	Free transfer	
1 January 2023	MF	(Norway) Heine Åsen Larsen	Egersund	Free transfer	
11 January 2023	MF	(Norway) Fredrik Torsteinbø	Sandnes Ulf	Free transfer	
31 January 2023	FW	(Norway) Daniel Karlsbakk	(Netherlands) Heerenveen	Undisclosed	
15 March 2023	DF	(Norway) Vebjørn Hagen	Retired		
23 March 2023	FW	(Sweden) Kevin Kabran	Stabæk	Undisclosed	
8 August 2023	MF	(Norway) Niklas Sandberg	Sarpsborg 08	Undisclosed	
10 August 2023	MF	(Iceland) Birkir Bjarnason	(Italy) Brescia	Undisclosed	

=== Loans in ===
Start date	Pos.	Name	From	End date	Ref.
30 August 2023	FW	(Nigeria) Samuel Adegbenro	(China) Beijing Guoan	End of season	

=== Loans out ===
Start date	Pos.	Name	To	End date	Ref.
24 January 2023	FW	(Guinea) Maï Traoré	(Belgium) OH Leuven	31 March 2023	
31 January 2023	DF	(Norway) Kristoffer Forgaard Paulsen	(Iceland) KA	18 August 2023	
31 March 2023	FW	(Guinea) Maï Traoré	Tromsø	End of season	
2 April 2023	GK	(Norway) Magnus Rugland Ree	Levanger	2 May 2023	
11 April 2023	MF	(Norway) Lars Erik Sødal	Bryne	End of season	
2 May 2023	MF	(Norway) Sondre Auklend	Jerv	10 August 2023	
27 July 2023	MF	(Norway) Simen Kvia-Egeskog	Skeid	End of season	
18 August 2023	DF	(Norway) Kristoffer Forgaard Paulsen	Junkeren	End of season	

== Friendlies ==
=== Pre-season ===
The following friendly matches were played in pre-season.

19 January 2023 Friendly	Bodø/Glimt	1–0	Viking	Alicante, Spain
16:00 CET	Nordås 51' (pen.)	Report		Stadium: Pinatar Arena

27 January 2023 Friendly	Sandnes Ulf	1–4	Viking	Sandnes, Norway
19:00 CET	Pattynama 90+1' (o.g.)	Report	D'Agostino 12'; Brekalo 29'; Tangen 39'; Kabran 79'	Stadium: Øster Hus Arena

3 February 2023 Friendly	Viking (Norway)	2–0	(Sweden) Halmstad	Algarve, Portugal
18:00 CET	Sandberg 3'; Svendsen 89'	Report

7 February 2023 Friendly	Viking (Norway)	0–0 (6–5 p)	(Denmark) Copenhagen	Algarve, Portugal
20:00 CET		Report

10 February 2023 Friendly	Viking (Norway)	2–3	(Denmark) Brøndby	Algarve, Portugal
15:30 CET	Austbø 19'; Svendsen 90'	Report	Sebulonsen 36'; Omoijuanfo 42'; Hedlund 45'

14 February 2023 Friendly	Viking	4–4	Egersund	Stavanger, Norway
14:00 CET	Austbø 50'; Kvia-Egeskog 59', 90'; Fiksdal 90'	Report	Michalsen 1'; Vevatne 36' (o.g.); Larsen 65'; Lynum 89'	Stadium: Viking Stadion

16 February 2023 Friendly	Bryne	0–2	Viking	Bryne, Norway
14:00 CET		Report	Husebø 40' (o.g.); D'Agostino 42'	Stadium: Aarbakkebanen

23 February 2023 Friendly	Viking	2–3	Strømsgodset	Marbella, Spain
14:00 CET	Løkberg 61'; Tripić 90+2'	Report	Ekeland 43'; Therkelsen 54'; Mehnert 56'

26 February 2023 Friendly	Viking	2–2	Lillestrøm	Marbella, Spain
13:00 CET	Austbø 27'; Haugen 45+2'	Report	Olsen 19'; Adams 46'

2 March 2023 Friendly	Viking	0–1	Jerv	Marbella, Spain
13:00 CET		Report	Hustad 82'

24 March 2023 Friendly	Kristiansund	4–1	Viking	Kristiansund, Norway
17:00 CET	9'; 12'; 82'; 90+3'	Report	Kvia-Egeskog 8'

2 April 2023 Friendly	Haugesund	1–1	Viking	Haugesund, Norway
15:00 CEST	Diarra 42'	Report	D'Agostino 80'

== Competitions ==
=== Eliteserien ===
==== Table ====
Pos	Team	Pld	W	D	L	GF	GA	GD	Pts	Qualification or relegation
2	Brann	30	19	4	7	55	35	+20	61	Qualification for the Conference League second qualifying round
3	Tromsø	30	19	4	7	48	33	+15	61	Qualification for the Conference League second qualifying round
4	Viking	30	18	4	8	61	48	+13	58	
5	Molde	30	15	6	9	65	39	+26	51	Qualification for the Europa League second qualifying round (Note: Molde qualified for the Europa League second qualifying round by winning the 2023 Norwegian Football Cup.)
6	Lillestrøm	30	13	4	13	49	49	0	43	

Source: Football Association of Norway (in Norwegian)
Rules for classification: 1) Points; 2) Goal difference; 3) Goals scored; 4) Head-to-head points; 5) Head-to-head goal difference; 6) Head-to-head goals scored.

==== Results summary ====
Overall								Home						Away					
Pld	W	D	L	GF	GA	GD	Pts	W	D	L	GF	GA	GD	W	D	L	GF	GA	GD
30	18	4	8	61	48	+13	58	10	2	3	39	28	+11	8	2	5	22	20	+2

Source: see below

==== Results by round ====
Round	1	2	3	4	5	6	7	8	9	10	11	12	13	14	15	16	17	18	19	21	22	23	20^{1}	24	25	26	27	28	29	30
Ground	A	H	A	H	H	A	H	A	H	A	H	A	H	A	H	A	H	A	H	H	A	H	A	A	H	A	A	H	A	H
Result	L	W	D	W	D	W	W	L	L	W	W	W	W	W	W	W	W	W	W	D	W	W	L	D	L	L	L	W	W	L
Position	11	7	8	4	4	3	2	4	6	4	4	4	3	2	2	2	2	2	2	2	1	1	2	2	2	4	4	4	4	4

Source: NIFS
A = Away; H = Home; W = Win; D = Draw; L = Loss; P = Postponed

^{1} Matchday 20 (vs. Molde) was postponed until further notice due to Molde's participation in the 2023–24 UEFA Champions League play-off round against Galatasaray.

==== Matches ====
The Eliteserien fixtures were announced on 9 December 2022.

10 April 2023 1	Rosenborg	1–0	Viking	Trondheim
14:30 CEST	Pereira 58'	Report		Stadium: Lerkendal Stadion; Attendance: 15,104; Referee: Espen Eskås

15 April 2023 2	Viking	2–0	Lillestrøm	Stavanger
18:00 CEST	Bjørshol 76'; Yazbek 90+4'	Report		Stadium: Viking Stadion; Attendance: 15,231; Referee: Mohammad Usman Aslam

23 April 2023 3	Tromsø	1–1	Viking	Tromsø
17:00 CEST	Erlien 30' (pen.)	Report	Svendsen 70'	Stadium: Alfheim Stadion; Attendance: 5,028; Referee: Sivert Amland

30 April 2023 4	Viking	7–3	HamKam	Stavanger
17:00 CEST	D'Agostino 48'; Svendsen 50'; Bjørshol 61'; Salvesen 69'; Pattynama 72'; Tripić 78' (pen.); Tangen 85'	Report	Kirkevold 23'; Norheim 74'; Andreassen 83'	Stadium: Viking Stadion; Attendance: 9,932; Referee: Marius Hansen Grøtta

7 May 2023 5	Viking	1–1	Strømsgodset	Stavanger
17:00 CEST	Bjarnason 89'	Report	Brunes 75'	Stadium: Viking Stadion; Attendance: 9,477; Referee: Tore Hansen

13 May 2023 6	Sandefjord	1–2	Viking	Sandefjord
17:00 CEST	Tveter 11'	Report	D'Agostino 14'; Løkberg 90'	Stadium: Sandefjord Arena; Attendance: 3,463; Referee: Steinar Hauge

16 May 2023 7	Viking	3–2	Odd	Stavanger
18:00 CEST	Tripić 62' (pen.), 81' (pen.); Svendsen 87'	Report	Jørgensen 10'; Wallem 45+3'	Stadium: Viking Stadion; Attendance: 15,900; Referee: Kristoffer Hagenes

29 May 2023 8	Bodø/Glimt	5–1	Viking	Bodø
17:00 CEST	Grønbæk 18'; Mvuka 28', 90+5'; Pellegrino 88'; Berg 90+1'	Report	Salvesen 78'	Stadium: Aspmyra Stadion; Attendance: 6,633; Referee: Espen Eskås

4 June 2023 9	Viking	3–4	Molde	Stavanger
19:15 CEST	Stensness 6'; Bjørshol 47'; Tripić 50'	Report	Breivik 2'; Brynhildsen 28', 90+3'; Grødem 75'	Stadium: Viking Stadion; Attendance: 9,649; Referee: Ola Hobber Nilsen

11 June 2023 10	Sarpsborg 08	1–3	Viking	Sarpsborg
17:00 CEST	Maigaard 86'	Report	Tangen 13'; Brekalo 48'; Svendsen 90+2'	Stadium: Sarpsborg Stadion; Attendance: 4,847; Referee: Marius Lien

24 June 2023 11	Viking	3–1	Brann	Stavanger
18:00 CEST	Tripić 41' (pen.), 75'; Salvesen 69'	Report	Finne 32'	Stadium: Viking Stadion; Attendance: 15,007; Referee: Tore Hansen

1 July 2023 12	Vålerenga	1–2	Viking	Oslo
18:00 CEST	Strandberg 85' (pen.)	Report	Salvesen 19'; Sandberg 90+7'	Stadium: Intility Arena; Attendance: 8,977; Referee: Mohammad Usman Aslam

8 July 2023 13	Viking	2–0	Haugesund	Stavanger
18:00 CEST	Salvesen 63'; Tripic 73'	Report		Stadium: Viking Stadion; Attendance: 10,420; Referee: Kristoffer Hagenes

16 July 2023 14	Stabæk	0–1	Viking	Bærum
17:00 CEST		Report	Bjarnason 90+1'	Stadium: Nadderud Stadion; Attendance: 3,009; Referee: Marius Lien

24 July 2023 15	Viking	3–1	Aalesund	Stavanger
19:00 CEST	Brekalo 24'; Tripić 70' (pen.), 90+4'	Report	Segberg 40'	Stadium: Viking Stadion; Attendance: 11,089; Referee: Svein Tore Sinnes

30 July 2023 16	Brann	0–2	Viking	Bergen
17:00 CEST		Report	Bjørshol 29'; Sandberg 90+8' (pen.)	Stadium: Brann Stadion; Attendance: 15,903; Referee: Sigurd Kringstad

6 August 2023 17	Viking	3–2	Bodø/Glimt	Stavanger
17:00 CEST	Salvesen 4'; Solbakken 7'; Tripic 75'	Report	Moumbagna 21'; Grønbæk 39'	Stadium: Viking Stadion; Attendance: 15,703; Referee: Ola Hobber Nilsen

13 August 2023 18	Lillestrøm	1–3	Viking	Lillestrøm
17:00 CEST	Olsen 90+1'	Report	D'Agostino 51'; Salvesen 68'; Solbakken 83'	Stadium: Åråsen Stadion; Attendance: 7,466; Referee: Rohit Saggi

20 August 2023 19	Viking	1–0	Stabæk	Stavanger
17:00 CEST	Brekalo 89'	Report		Stadium: Viking Stadion; Attendance: 14,256; Referee: Sivert Amland

2 September 2023 21	Viking	1–1	Vålerenga	Stavanger
18:00 CEST	Bitri 63' (o.g.)	Report	Brochgrevink 86'	Stadium: Viking Stadion; Attendance: 14,675; Referee: Tore Hansen

16 September 2023 22	Haugesund	0–2	Viking	Haugesund
18:00 CEST		Report	Langås 41'; Tripić 64'	Stadium: Haugesund Stadion; Attendance: 8,210; Referee: Espen Eskås

24 September 2023 23	Viking	4–3	Sandefjord	Stavanger
17:00 CEST	de Lanlay 12'; Salvesen 17', 53'; Adegbenro 85'	Report	Nyenetue 29'; Al-Saed 41'; Ruud Tveter 90' (pen.)	Stadium: Viking Stadion; Attendance: 13,022; Referee: Sigurd Kringstad

1 October 2023 20	Molde	4–0	Viking	Molde
17:00 CEST	Eikrem 10', 63'; Eriksen 21'; Haugen 59'	Report		Stadium: Aker Stadion; Attendance: 6,729; Referee: Kristoffer Hagenes
Note: The game was rescheduled from 26 August due to Molde's participation in the 2023–24 UEFA Champions League play-off round against Galatasaray.

7 October 2023 24	Odd	1–1	Viking	Skien
18:00 CEST	Langås 26' (o.g.)	Report	Tangen 5'	Stadium: Skagerak Arena; Attendance: 5,632; Referee: Kai Erik Steen

22 October 2023 25	Viking	3–4	Tromsø	Stavanger
19:15 CEST	Yazbek 63'; Auklend 79'; Salvesen 85'	Report	Erlien 48', 51'; Vesterlund 89'; Paintsil 90+4'	Stadium: Viking Stadion; Attendance: 13,105; Referee: Espen Eskås

29 October 2023 26	Strømsgodset	1–0	Viking	Drammen
17:00 CET	Melkersen 29'	Report		Stadium: Marienlyst Stadion; Attendance: 4,860; Referee: Steinar Hauge

4 November 2023 27	HamKam	3–0	Viking	Hamar
18:00 CET	Mawa 63'; Kjærgaard 66'; Enkerud 90+6'	Report		Stadium: Briskeby Arena; Attendance: 2,945; Referee: Ola Hobber Nilsen

12 November 2023 28	Viking	2–1	Sarpsborg 08	Stavanger
17:00 CET	Adegbenro 55', 72'	Report	Zekhnini 15'	Stadium: Viking Stadion; Attendance: 11,425; Referee: Kristoffer Hagenes

26 November 2023 29	Aalesund	0–4	Viking	Ålesund
17:00 CET		Report	Diop 2'; Adegbenro 11'; Svendsen 56'; Tripić 88'	Stadium: Color Line Stadion; Attendance: 4,630; Referee: Sivert Amland

3 December 2023 30	Viking	1–5	Rosenborg	Stavanger
17:00 CET	Tripić 71' (pen.)	Report	Þorvaldsson 26', 59'; Pereira 47'; Wiedesheim-Paul 90+7'; Nypan 90+10'	Stadium: Viking Stadion; Attendance: 14,950; Referee: Kai Erik Steen

=== Norwegian Cup ===
==== 2022 ====
The tournament continued from the 2022 season. The draw for the fourth round was made on 24 August 2022. The draw for the quarter-finals was made on 19 January 2023.

12 March 2023 Fourth round	Viking	2–0	Rosenborg	Stavanger
20:15 CET	Svendsen 64'; Salvesen 67'	Report		Stadium: Viking Stadion; Attendance: 5,433; Referee: Rohit Saggi

18 March 2023 Quarter-final	Bodø/Glimt	5–3	Viking	Bodø
16:15 CET	Espejord 52', 81'; Žugelj 70', 75'; Pellegrino 90+1'	Report	Tripić 35'; Stensness 45+2'; Salvesen 59'	Stadium: Aspmyra Stadion; Referee: Kristoffer Hagenes

==== 2023 ====
The pair-ups for the first round were announced on 12 April 2023.

24 May 2023 First round	Forus og Gausel	0–5	Viking	Stavanger
18:00 CEST		Report	Bjørshol 21', 45'; Austbø 52'; Diop 55'; Svendsen 73'	Stadium: XL-Bygg-banen; Attendance: 1,500; Referee: Aleksander S. Vermundsen

1 June 2023 Second round	Vidar	0–2	Viking	Stavanger
18:00 CEST		Report	Bjarnason 61', 71'	Stadium: Lassa Idrettspark; Attendance: 1,000; Referee: Javi Mertens

7 June 2023 Third round	Fredrikstad	1–2	Viking	Fredrikstad
20:00 CEST	Alba 15'	Report	Bjarnason 37'; Tripić 90+4' (pen.)	Stadium: Fredrikstad Stadion; Attendance: 2,860; Referee: Rohit Saggi

28 June 2023 Fourth round	Raufoss	4–4 (a.e.t.) (4–1 p)	Viking	Raufoss
18:00 CEST	Mettler 42' (pen.); Brattbakk 73'; Helmersen 86'; Somesi 110'	Report	D'Agostino 12' (pen.); Svendsen 55'; Sandberg 77', 102'	Stadium: Nammo Stadion; Attendance: 1,578; Referee: Sivert Ø. Amland
	Penalties
	Mettler (penalty scored); Brattbakk (penalty scored); Simenstad (penalty scored); Racaj (penalty scored)		(penalty missed) Sandberg; (penalty missed) Svendsen; (penalty scored) Vevatne

== Squad statistics ==
=== Appearances and goals ===
As of match played 3 December 2023

No.	Pos	Nat	Player	Total		Eliteserien		Norwegian Cup	
No.	Pos	Nat	Player	Apps	Goals	Apps	Goals	Apps	Goals
1	GK	(Norway) NOR	Arild Østbø	4	0	0	0	4	0
2	DF	(Norway) NOR	Herman Haugen	26	0	22	0	4	0
3	DF	(Norway) NOR	Viljar Vevatne	16	0	13	0	3	0
4	DF	(Slovenia) SLO	David Brekalo	27	3	23	3	4	0
5	DF	(Senegal) SEN	Djibril Diop	29	2	24	1	5	1
6	DF	(Australia) AUS	Gianni Stensness	12	2	9	1	3	1
7	FW	(Australia) AUS	Nicholas D'Agostino	27	4	21	3	6	1
8	MF	(Norway) NOR	Markus Solbakken	30	2	27	2	3	0
9	FW	(Norway) NOR	Lars-Jørgen Salvesen	35	12	29	10	6	2
10	FW	(Norway) NOR	Zlatko Tripić	34	15	29	13	5	2
11	MF	(Norway) NOR	Yann-Erik de Lanlay	30	1	24	1	6	0
14	MF	(Australia) AUS	Patrick Yazbek	30	2	26	2	4	0
16	MF	(Norway) NOR	Kristoffer Løkberg	14	1	9	1	5	0
18	DF	(Norway) NOR	Sondre Bjørshol	22	6	20	4	2	2
19	MF	(Norway) NOR	Sondre Auklend	10	1	10	1	0	0
20	DF	(Indonesia) IDN	Shayne Pattynama	34	1	28	1	6	0
21	MF	(Norway) NOR	Harald Nilsen Tangen	35	3	29	3	6	0
22	DF	(Norway) NOR	Sondre Langås	10	1	10	1	0	0
23	DF	(Slovenia) SLO	Jošt Urbančič	5	0	4	0	1	0
25	MF	(New Zealand) NZL	Joe Bell	11	0	11	0	0	0
27	FW	(Nigeria) NGR	Samuel Adegbenro	11	4	11	4	0	0
29	FW	(Norway) NOR	Sander Svendsen	35	8	30	5	5	3
30	GK	(Iceland) ISL	Patrik Gunnarsson	32	0	30	0	2	0
41	DF	(Norway) NOR	Jone Nygård Berg	1	0	0	0	1	0
43	FW	(Norway) NOR	Jesper Fiksdal	1	0	1	0	0	0
Players who left Viking on loan during the season:
17	FW	(Norway) NOR	Edvin Austbø	11	1	7	0	4	1
26	MF	(Norway) NOR	Simen Kvia-Egeskog	3	0	0	0	3	0
28	MF	(Norway) NOR	Lars Erik Sødal	1	0	0	0	1	0
Players who left Viking during the season:
9	FW	(Sweden) SWE	Kevin Kabran	1	0	0	0	1	0
15	FW	(Norway) NOR	Niklas Sandberg	14	4	11	2	3	2
27	MF	(Iceland) ISL	Birkir Bjarnason	15	5	11	2	4	3
