= Djibril Diop =

Djibril Diop may refer to:

- Djibril Diop Mambéty, Senegalese film director and actor
- Djibril Diop (footballer), Senegalese footballer
