= Kristoffer Paulsen =

Kristoffer Paulsen may refer to:

- Kristoffer Paulsen Vatshaug (born 1981), Norwegian former footballer
- Kristoffer Forgaard Paulsen (born 2004), Norwegian footballer who plays for Viking FK
