= Herman Haugen =

Norwegian footballer (born 2000)

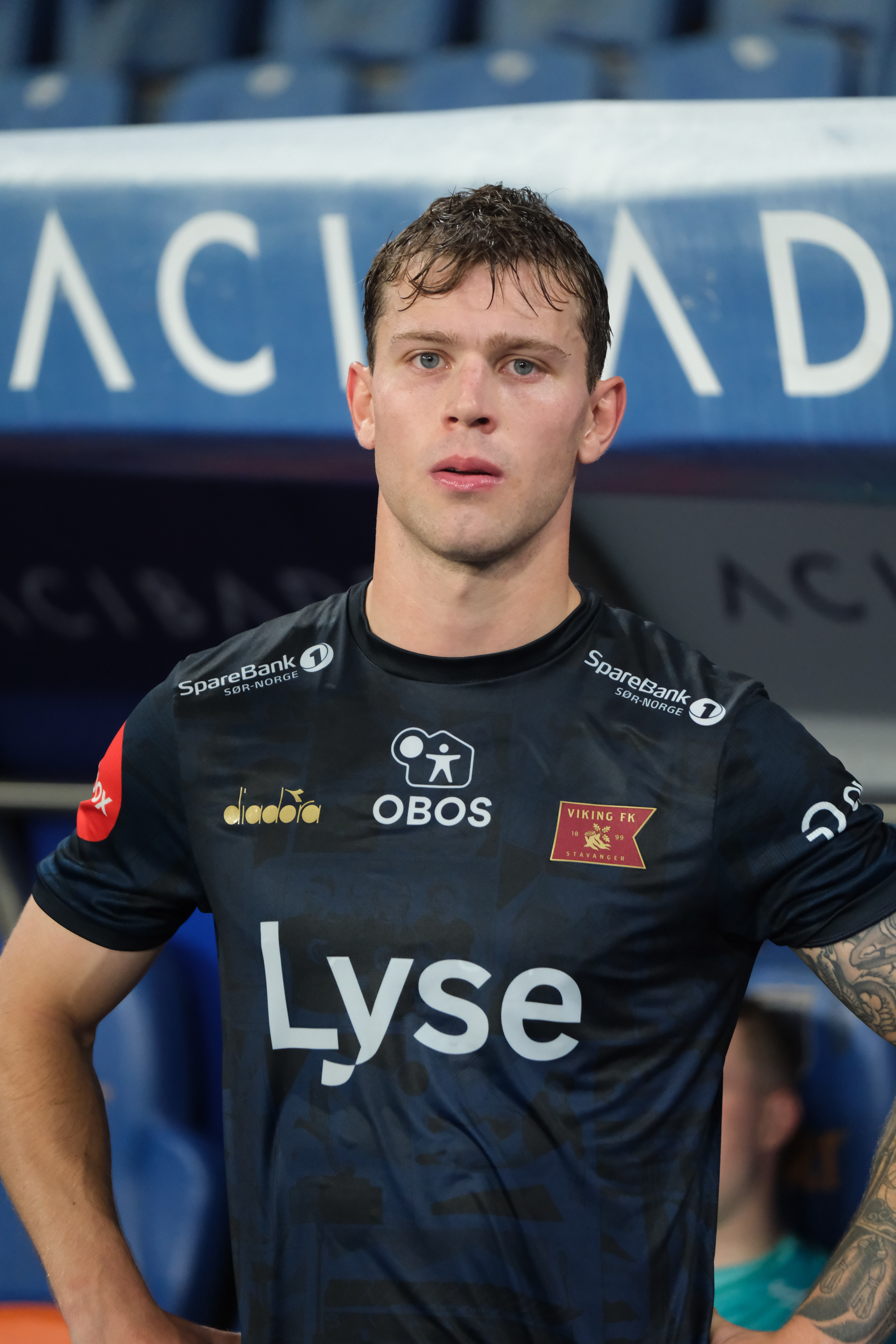
- Haugen with Viking in 2025

Personal information
- Full name: Herman Johan Haugen
- Date of birth: 25 April 2000 (age 26)
- Height: 1.82 m (6 ft 0 in)
- Position: Right-back

Team information
- Current team: Viking
- Number: 2

Youth career
- –2013: Hana
- 2013–2019: Viking

Senior career*
Years	Team	Apps	(Gls)
2019	→ Vidar (loan)	19	(1)
2020–	Viking	94	(2)
2020	→ Ull/Kisa (loan)	22	(0)
2021–2022	→ Raufoss (loan)	26	(3)
- * Club domestic league appearances and goals as of 23 July 2026

Herman Johan Haugen (born 25 April 2000) is a Norwegian professional footballer who plays as a right-back for Viking.

== Career ==
Haugen joined the academy of Viking FK from Hana IL at the age of 13. In 2019, he was loaned out to 2. divisjon club Vidar. On 6 February 2020, he signed a professional two-year contract with Viking, after impressing head coach Bjarne Berntsen and the rest of the coaching staff in pre-season. He spent most of the 2020 season on loan at 1. divisjon club Ull/Kisa, where he made 22 appearances. On 9 May 2021, he made his Eliteserien debut for Viking as a 76th-minute substitute in a 3–1 win against Brann. On 31 August 2021, he signed a two-year contract extension with Viking and simultaneously joined 1. divisjon club Raufoss on loan until the end of the season. The loan was extended in February 2022. In July 2022, he returned to his parent club Viking after they had sold another right-back, Sebastian Sebulonsen, to Brøndby IF.

Haugen made 19 appearances and scored one goal as Viking won the 2025 Eliteserien.

== Career statistics ==
As of match played 30 November 2025

Appearances and goals by club, season and competition
Club	Season	League			National cup		Other		Total	
Club	Season	Division	Apps	Goals	Apps	Goals	Apps	Goals	Apps	Goals
Vidar (loan)	2019	2. divisjon	19	1	0	0	—		19	1
Viking	2020	Eliteserien	0	0	—		—		0	0
Viking	2021	Eliteserien	10	0	2	0	—		12	0
Viking	2022	Eliteserien	12	1	2	0	—		14	1
Viking	2023	Eliteserien	22	0	3	0	—		25	0
Viking	2024	Eliteserien	21	0	1	0	—		22	0
Viking	2025	Eliteserien	19	1	6	0	2 (Note: Appearances in UEFA Conference League)	0	27	1
Viking	Total		84	2	14	0	2	0	100	2
Ull/Kisa (loan)	2020	1. divisjon	22	0	—		—		22	0
Raufoss (loan)	2021	1. divisjon	14	0	1	0	—		15	0
Raufoss (loan)	2022	1. divisjon	12	3	2	0	—		14	3
Raufoss (loan)	Total		26	3	3	0	—		29	3
Career total			151	6	17	0	2	0	170	6

== Honours ==
Viking

- Eliteserien: 2025
