= 2020 Viking FK season =

Viking 2020 football season

Viking
2020 season
- Chair: Thor Steinar Sandvik
- Manager: Bjarne Berntsen
- Stadium: Viking Stadion
- Eliteserien: 6th
- Norwegian Cup: Cancelled
- UEFA Europa League: Second qualifying round
- Top goalscorer: League: Veton Berisha (16); All: Veton Berisha (16)
Home colours	Away colours	Third colours

The 2020 season was Viking's 2nd consecutive year in Eliteserien, and their 70th season in the top flight of Norwegian football. The club participated in the Eliteserien and the UEFA Europa League. The Norwegian Cup was cancelled.

== Squad ==
As of 28 November 2020

Note: Flags indicate national team as defined under FIFA eligibility rules; some limited exceptions apply. Players may hold more than one non-FIFA nationality.

No.	Pos.	Nation	Player
1	GK	NOR	Iven Austbø
3	DF	NOR	Viljar Vevatne (captain)
5	DF	ISL	Axel Andrésson
6	DF	NOR	Runar Hove
7	MF	KOS	Zymer Bytyqi
8	MF	NZL	Joe Bell
9	MF	NOR	Fredrik Torsteinbø
10	FW	NOR	Tommy Høiland
11	FW	NOR	Yann-Erik de Lanlay
13	GK	WAL	Michael Crowe
14	FW	NOR	Veton Berisha
15	MF	NOR	Johnny Furdal
16	FW	NOR	Even Østensen

No.	Pos.	Nation	Player
17	FW	NOR	Sebastian Sebulonsen
18	DF	NOR	Sondre Bjørshol
19	MF	NOR	Sondre Auklend
20	FW	KOS	Ylldren Ibrahimaj
22	GK	NOR	Arild Østbø
23	DF	NOR	Rolf Daniel Vikstøl
24	MF	NOR	Kristoffer Løkberg
25	DF	NOR	Sebastian Sørlie Henriksen
26	FW	NOR	Jefferson de Souza
27	MF	ISL	Samúel Friðjónsson
34	DF	NOR	Kristoffer Forgaard Paulsen
35	DF	NOR	Henrik Heggheim
41	GK	NOR	Trym Sølvberg Ur

=== Out on loan ===
Note: Flags indicate national team as defined under FIFA eligibility rules; some limited exceptions apply. Players may hold more than one non-FIFA nationality.

No.	Pos.	Nation	Player
2	DF	NOR	Herman Haugen (at Ull/Kisa)
4	DF	NOR	Tord Salte (at Sandnes Ulf)

No.	Pos.	Nation	Player
21	MF	NOR	Harald Nilsen Tangen (at Åsane)

== Transfers ==
=== Transfers in ===
Date	Pos.	Name	From	Fee	Ref.
1 January 2020	GK	(Norway) Arild Østbø	Rosenborg	Free transfer	
1 January 2020	FW	(Norway) Yann-Erik de Lanlay	Rosenborg	Free transfer	
1 January 2020	FW	(Norway) Sebastian Sebulonsen	Sola	Undisclosed	
10 January 2020	MF	(New Zealand) Joe Bell	(United States) Virginia Cavaliers	Undisclosed	
13 January 2020	FW	(Norway) Veton Berisha	Brann	Undisclosed	
6 February 2020	DF	(Norway) Herman Haugen	Promoted from junior squad		
6 February 2020	FW	(Norway) Jefferson de Souza	Brodd	Undisclosed	
15 May 2020	DF	(Norway) Sebastian Sørlie Henriksen	Promoted from junior squad		
15 May 2020	MF	(Norway) Sondre Auklend	Promoted from junior squad		
11 June 2020	DF	(Norway) Henrik Heggheim	Promoted from junior squad		
11 June 2020	MF	(Norway) Lars Erik Sødal	Promoted from junior squad		
9 July 2020	GK	(Norway) Trym Sølvberg Ur	Promoted from junior squad		
6 August 2020	GK	(Wales) Michael Crowe	Free agent (Note: Previous club: Preston North End)		
28 August 2020	DF	(Norway) Kristoffer Forgaard Paulsen	Promoted from junior squad		
5 October 2020	MF	(Iceland) Samúel Friðjónsson	Free agent (Note: Previous club: SC Paderborn)		

=== Transfers out ===
Date	Pos.	Name	To	Fee	Ref.
1 January 2020	GK	(Norway) Amund Wichne	Start	Free transfer	
1 January 2020	MF	(Norway) André Danielsen	Retired		
1 January 2020	MF	(Norway) Lasse Berg Johnsen	Released (Note: Joined Raufoss on 23 January 2020)		
1 January 2020	FW	(Norway) Jostein Ekeland	Sandnes Ulf	Free transfer	
3 January 2020	MF	(Norway) Kristian Thorstvedt	(Belgium) Genk	Undisclosed	
15 January 2020	FW	(Norway) Zlatko Tripić	(Turkey) Göztepe	Undisclosed	
3 July 2020	GK	(Norway) Erik Arnebrott	Contract terminated		
12 September 2020	DF	(Norway) Adrian Pereira	(Greece) PAOK	Undisclosed	

=== Loans out ===
Start date	Pos.	Name	To	End date	Ref.
5 February 2020	DF	(Norway) Tord Salte	Sandnes Ulf	End of season	
26 June 2020	DF	(Norway) Herman Haugen	Ull/Kisa	End of season	
8 August 2020	DF	(Norway) Sebastian Sørlie Henriksen	Fram Larvik	End of season	
26 August 2020	MF	(Norway) Harald Nilsen Tangen	Åsane	End of season	

== Friendlies ==
On 12 December 2019, Viking announced the friendly matches to be played in pre-season.

On 12 March 2020, all football in Norway was suspended due to the COVID-19 pandemic.

=== Pre-season ===
29 January 2020 Friendly	WSG Tirol (Austria)	1–3	(Norway) Viking	La Manga, Spain
15:30 CET (UTC+1)	Pranter 42'	Report	Bytyqi 30'; Nilsen Tangen 36'; Bjørshol 90'

1 February 2020 Friendly	LASK (Austria)	1–0	(Norway) Viking	La Finca, Spain
14:00 CET (UTC+1)	Wiesinger 82'	Report

9 February 2020 Friendly	Viking	1–1	Arendal	Stavanger, Norway
18:00 CET (UTC+1)	Sebulonsen 58'	Report	Arndal 75'	Stadium: Viking Stadion

16 February 2020 Friendly	Viking	3–2	Jerv	Stavanger, Norway
16:00 CET (UTC+1)	Furdal 25'; Nilsen Tangen 36'; Ibrahimaj 75'	Report	Campos 10' (pen.), 50'	Stadium: Viking Stadion; Attendance: 250

23 February 2020 Friendly	Viking	1–3	Stabæk	Stavanger, Norway
18:00 CET (UTC+1)	Ibrahimaj 67'	Report	Bohinen 41' (pen.); Isaksen 77'; Azemi 90'	Stadium: Viking Stadion

28 February 2020 Friendly	Chayka (Russia)	3–5	(Norway) Viking	Marbella, Spain
16:00 CET (UTC+1)	Østbø 45' (o.g.); Kulik 67'; Bezdenezhnykh 69' (pen.)	Report	Hove 48'; Torsteinbø 50', 55'; Østensen 82'; Høiland 89'

1 March 2020 Friendly	Tromsø	1–1	Viking	Marbella, Spain
18:00 CET (UTC+1)	Grønli 88'	Report	Vevatne 63'

6 March 2020 Friendly	Honka (Finland)	2–1	(Norway) Viking	Marbella, Spain
16:00 CET (UTC+1)	Kandji 18'; Arko-Mensah 83'	Report	Vevatne 37'

6 June 2020 Friendly	Sandnes Ulf	1–3	Viking	Sandnes, Norway
18:00 CEST (UTC+2)	Berntsen 33'	Report	Ibrahimaj 40'; Sebulonsen 71', 78'	Stadium: Øster Hus Arena; Attendance: 0 Referee: Daniel Higraff

10 June 2020 Friendly	Haugesund	1–1	Viking	Haugesund, Norway
18:00 CEST (UTC+2)	Ammitzbøll 63'	Report	Vevatne 29'	Stadium: Haugesund Stadion; Attendance: 0 Referee: Aleksander Vermundsen

11 June 2020 Friendly	Viking	5–0	Sandnes Ulf	Stavanger, Norway
13:00 CEST (UTC+2)	Østensen 33', 53' (pen.) de Souza 59'; Nilsen Tangen 65'; Bell 67'	Report		Stadium: Viking Stadion; Attendance: 0 Referee: Tore Hansen

== Competitions ==
=== Eliteserien ===
==== Table ====
Pos	Team	Pld	W	D	L	GF	GA	GD	Pts	Qualification or relegation
4	Rosenborg	30	15	7	8	50	35	+15	52	Qualification for the Europa Conference League second qualifying round
5	Kristiansund	30	12	12	6	57	45	+12	48	
6	Viking	30	12	8	10	54	52	+2	44	
7	Odd	30	13	4	13	52	51	+1	43	
8	Stabæk	30	9	12	9	41	45	−4	39	

Source: Football Association of Norway (in Norwegian)
Rules for classification: 1) Points; 2) Goal difference; 3) Goals scored; 4) Head-to-head points; 5) Head-to-head goal difference; 6) Head-to-head away goals scored (only if between two teams); 7) Head-to-head goals scored; 8) Play-off (only used to decide champions or relegation).

==== Results summary ====
Overall								Home						Away					
Pld	W	D	L	GF	GA	GD	Pts	W	D	L	GF	GA	GD	W	D	L	GF	GA	GD
30	12	8	10	54	52	+2	44	7	4	4	34	22	+12	5	4	6	20	30	−10

Source: see below

==== Results by round ====
Round	1	2	3	4	5	6	7	8	9	10	11	12	13	14	15	16	17	18	19	20	21	22	23	24	25	26	27	28	29	30
Ground	H	A	H	A	H	A	H	A	A	H	A	H	A	H	A	H	A	H	A	H	H	A	A	H	A	H	H	A	H	A
Result	L	L	D	L	W	D	L	L	W	W	L	L	D	D	W	W	W	W	W	D	L	D	L	W	W	W	W	D	D	L
Position	15	14	13	15	12	12	13	14	12	10	12	13	13	14	12	10	8	7	7	7	7	7	8	7	7	7	7	6	6	6

Source: nifs.no
A = Away; H = Home; W = Win; D = Draw; L = Loss

==== Matches ====
The Eliteserien fixtures were announced on 19 December 2019. The season was originally scheduled to start on 4 April, but due to the coronavirus pandemic the football season was delayed. The new start date for the league was 16 June.

16 June 2020 1	Viking	2–4	Bodø/Glimt	Stavanger
18:00 CEST (UTC+2)	Torsteinbø 21'; Østensen 42'	Report	Saltnes 27'; Hauge 57'; Fet 69'; Zinckernagel 80'	Stadium: Viking Stadion; Attendance: 200; Referee: Kristoffer Hagenes

21 June 2020 2	Brann	3–0	Viking	Bergen
20:30 CEST (UTC+2)	Bamba 52'; Koomson 61'; Hustad 90+4'	Report		Stadium: Brann Stadion; Attendance: 200; Referee: Tommy Skjerven

24 June 2020 3	Viking	1–1	Mjøndalen	Stavanger
18:00 CEST (UTC+2)	Berisha 41' (pen.)	Report	Ibrahim 19'	Stadium: Viking Stadion; Attendance: 200; Referee: Kai Erik Steen

27 June 2020 4	Vålerenga	2–1	Viking	Oslo
20:30 CEST (UTC+2)	Vilhjálmsson 18'; Vega 86'	Report	Ibrahimaj 71'	Stadium: Intility Arena; Attendance: 200; Referee: Espen Eskås

1 July 2020 5	Viking	2–0	Sandefjord	Stavanger
18:00 CEST (UTC+2)	Løkberg 56'; Berisha 60'	Report		Stadium: Viking Stadion; Attendance: 200; Referee: Rohit Saggi

4 July 2020 6	Start	1–1	Viking	Kristiansand
18:00 CEST (UTC+2)	Schulze 75'	Report	Bytyqi 84'	Stadium: Sør Arena; Attendance: 200; Referee: Ola Hobber Nilsen

12 July 2020 7	Viking	1–2	Odd	Stavanger
18:00 CEST (UTC+2)	Vevatne 61'	Report	Lauritsen 17'; Jakobsen 90+2'	Stadium: Viking Stadion; Attendance: 200; Referee: Tommy Skjerven

15 July 2020 8	Molde	5–0	Viking	Molde
18:00 CEST (UTC+2)	James 5' (pen.), 64'; Hussain 13'; Wingo 77'; Andersen 81'	Report		Stadium: Aker Stadion; Attendance: 200; Referee: Tom Harald Hagen

18 July 2020 9	Haugesund	0–2	Viking	Haugesund
20:30 CEST (UTC+2)		Report	Ibrahimaj 30'; Bytyqi 80'	Stadium: Haugesund Stadion; Attendance: 200; Referee: Kristoffer Hagenes

26 July 2020 10	Viking	3–0	Sarpsborg 08	Stavanger
18:00 CEST (UTC+2)	Løkberg 3'; Pereira 36', 46'	Report		Stadium: Viking Stadion; Attendance: 200; Referee: Sivert Amland

30 July 2020 11	Rosenborg	3–0	Viking	Trondheim
20:30 CEST (UTC+2)	Helland 40'; Hovland 56'; Børven 78'	Report		Stadium: Lerkendal Stadion; Attendance: 200; Referee: Espen Eskås

2 August 2020 12	Viking	1–2	Kristiansund	Stavanger
18:00 CEST (UTC+2)	Berisha 12'	Report	Skarsem 65'; Ulvestad 87'	Stadium: Viking Stadion; Attendance: 200; Referee: Rohit Saggi

9 August 2020 13	Aalesund	2–2	Viking	Ålesund
18:00 CEST (UTC+2)	Larsen 6'; Castro 80' (pen.)	Report	Berisha 24', 41' (pen.)	Stadium: Color Line Stadion; Attendance: 200; Referee: Tommy Skjerven

16 August 2020 14	Viking	3–3	Stabæk	Stavanger
18:00 CEST (UTC+2)	Berisha 42', 58' (pen.); Bytyqi 53'	Report	Lundal 22'; Bohinen 29'; Kinoshita 81'	Stadium: Viking Stadion; Attendance: 200; Referee: Marius Hansen Grøtta

22 August 2020 15	Strømsgodset	0–2	Viking	Drammen
18:00 CEST (UTC+2)		Report	Jack 74' (o.g.); Bell 90+1'	Stadium: Marienlyst Stadion; Attendance: 200; Referee: Kai Erik Steen

30 August 2020 16	Viking	3–2	Molde	Stavanger
20:30 CEST (UTC+2)	Berisha 58'; Ibrahimaj 72'; Torsteinbø 76'	Report	Andersen 67'; Ellingsen 90+2'	Stadium: Viking Stadion; Attendance: 200; Referee: Rohit Saggi

12 September 2020 17	Kristiansund	3–5	Viking	Kristiansund
18:00 CEST (UTC+2)	Pellegrino 39', 80'; Bye 75'	Report	Berisha 4', 61'; Bytyqi 69', 72'; Ibrahimaj 86'	Stadium: Kristiansund Stadion; Attendance: 200; Referee: Ola Hobber Nilsen

20 September 2020 18	Viking	5–2	Aalesund	Stavanger
18:00 CEST (UTC+2)	Bytyqi 5', 73'; Berisha 65' (pen.); Vikstøl 75'; Bell 90+2'	Report	Nordli 26' (pen.); Haugen 82' (pen.)	Stadium: Viking Stadion; Attendance: 200; Referee: Kristoffer Hagenes

27 September 2020 19	Mjøndalen	1–2	Viking	Mjøndalen
18:00 CEST (UTC+2)	Liseth 4'	Report	Bytyqi 35'; Høiland 69'	Stadium: Consto Arena; Attendance: 200; Referee: Tommy Skjerven

4 October 2020 20	Viking	2–2	Strømsgodset	Stavanger
18:00 CEST (UTC+2)	Vevatne 76' de Lanlay 90+4'	Report	Salvesen 53'; Hove 74'	Stadium: Viking Stadion; Attendance: 200; Referee: Dag Vidar Hafsås

27 October 2020 21	Viking	0–1	Haugesund	Stavanger
19:00 CET (UTC+1)		Report	Wadji 24'	Stadium: Viking Stadion; Attendance: 600; Referee: Espen Eskås
Note: The match was supposed to be played on 25 October, but was postponed due to Veton Berisha testing positive for the coronavirus on 14 October, and the whole team subsequently having to be in a 10 day quarantine.

1 November 2020 22	Stabæk	1–1	Viking	Bærum
18:00 CET (UTC+1)	Kassi 31'	Report	Bytyqi 41'	Stadium: Nadderud Stadion; Attendance: 600; Referee: Rohit Saggi

4 November 2020 23	Odd	3–0	Viking	Skien
19:00 CET (UTC+1)	Bakenga 18', 51'; Kitolano 58'	Report		Stadium: Skagerak Arena; Attendance: 600; Referee: Sigurd Smehus Kringstad
Note: The match was supposed to be played on 18 October, but was postponed due to Veton Berisha testing positive for the coronavirus on 14 October, and the whole team subsequently having to be in a 10 day quarantine.

8 November 2020 24	Viking	3–0	Rosenborg	Stavanger
18:00 CET (UTC+1)	Berisha 9' (pen.) de Lanlay 20'; Vevatne 42'	Report		Stadium: Viking Stadion; Attendance: 600; Referee: Kai Erik Steen

22 November 2020 25	Sarpsborg 08	1–2	Viking	Sarpsborg
18:00 CET (UTC+1)	Utvik 53'	Report	Ibrahimaj 60', 72'	Stadium: Sarpsborg Stadion; Attendance: 600; Referee: Mohammad Usman Aslam

28 November 2020 26	Viking	4–1	Start	Stavanger
16:00 CET (UTC+1)	Sebulonsen 20'; Friðjónsson 62'; Torsteinbø 70', 72'	Report	Kabran 90+1'	Stadium: Viking Stadion; Attendance: 600; Referee: Dag Vidar Hafsås

2 December 2020 27	Viking	2–0	Brann	Stavanger
18:00 CET (UTC+1)	Berisha 17'; Ibrahimaj 67'	Report		Stadium: Viking Stadion; Attendance: 600; Referee: Sigurd Smehus Kringstad

6 December 2020 28	Sandefjord	2–2	Viking	Sandefjord
17:00 CET (UTC+1)	Rufo 25', 73'	Report	Berisha 76', 88'	Stadium: Sandefjord Arena; Attendance: 0 Referee: Mohammad Usman Aslam

10 December 2020 29	Viking	2–2	Vålerenga	Stavanger
18:00 CET (UTC+1)	Berisha 82'; Bytyqi 88'	Report	Dønnum 45+1', 49'	Stadium: Viking Stadion; Attendance: 600; Referee: Rohit Saggi

19 December 2020 30	Bodø/Glimt	3–0	Viking	Bodø
18:00 CET (UTC+1)	Fet 14'; Junker 21', 89'	Report		Stadium: Aspmyra Stadion; Attendance: 600; Referee: Kristoffer Hagenes

=== Norwegian Cup ===
The 2020 edition of the Norwegian Football Cup was cancelled.

=== UEFA Europa League ===
==== Qualifying rounds ====
17 September 2020 Second qualifying round	Viking (Norway)	0–2	(Scotland) Aberdeen	Stavanger, Norway
20:30 CEST (UTC+2)		Report	McCrorie 44'; Hedges 78'	Stadium: Viking Stadion; Attendance: 0 Referee: Filip Glova (Slovakia)

== Squad statistics ==
As of match played 19 December 2020

=== Appearances and goals ===
No.	Pos	Nat	Player	Total		Eliteserien		Norwegian Cup		UEFA Europa League	
No.	Pos	Nat	Player	Apps	Goals	Apps	Goals	Apps	Goals	Apps	Goals
1	GK	(Norway) NOR	Iven Austbø	18	0	17	0	0	0	1	0
3	DF	(Norway) NOR	Viljar Vevatne	28	3	27	3	0	0	1	0
5	DF	(Iceland) ISL	Axel Andrésson	18	0	17	0	0	0	1	0
6	DF	(Norway) NOR	Runar Hove	3	0	3	0	0	0	0	0
7	MF	(Kosovo) KOS	Zymer Bytyqi	30	10	29	10	0	0	1	0
8	MF	(New Zealand) NZL	Joe Bell	30	2	29	2	0	0	1	0
9	MF	(Norway) NOR	Fredrik Torsteinbø	31	4	30	4	0	0	1	0
10	FW	(Norway) NOR	Tommy Høiland	27	1	26	1	0	0	1	0
11	FW	(Norway) NOR	Yann-Erik de Lanlay	20	2	19	2	0	0	1	0
13	GK	(Wales) WAL	Michael Crowe	1	0	1	0	0	0	0	0
14	FW	(Norway) NOR	Veton Berisha	29	16	28	16	0	0	1	0
15	MF	(Norway) NOR	Johnny Furdal	11	0	11	0	0	0	0	0
16	FW	(Norway) NOR	Even Østensen	18	1	17	1	0	0	1	0
17	FW	(Norway) NOR	Sebastian Sebulonsen	20	1	20	1	0	0	0	0
18	DF	(Norway) NOR	Sondre Bjørshol	11	0	10	0	0	0	1	0
19	MF	(Norway) NOR	Sondre Auklend	16	0	16	0	0	0	0	0
20	FW	(Kosovo) KOS	Ylldren Ibrahimaj	30	7	29	7	0	0	1	0
22	GK	(Norway) NOR	Arild Østbø	13	0	13	0	0	0	0	0
23	DF	(Norway) NOR	Rolf Daniel Vikstøl	19	1	18	1	0	0	1	0
24	MF	(Norway) NOR	Kristoffer Løkberg	24	2	24	2	0	0	0	0
26	FW	(Norway) NOR	Jefferson de Souza	6	0	6	0	0	0	0	0
27	MF	(Iceland) ISL	Samúel Friðjónsson	7	1	7	1	0	0	0	0
34	DF	(Norway) NOR	Kristoffer Forgaard Paulsen	1	0	1	0	0	0	0	0
35	DF	(Norway) NOR	Henrik Heggheim	27	0	26	0	0	0	1	0
Players away from Viking on loan:
21	MF	(Norway) NOR	Harald Nilsen Tangen	5	0	5	0	0	0	0	0
Players who left Viking during the season:
30	DF	(Norway) NOR	Adrian Pereira	15	2	15	2	0	0	0	0

=== Goal scorers ===
Rank	Pos.	Nat.	Player	Eliteserien	Norwegian Cup	UEFA Europa League	Total
1	FW	(Norway)	Veton Berisha	16	0	0	16
2	MF	(Kosovo)	Zymer Bytyqi	10	0	0	10
3	FW	(Kosovo)	Ylldren Ibrahimaj	7	0	0	7
4	MF	(Norway)	Fredrik Torsteinbø	4	0	0	4
5	DF	(Norway)	Viljar Vevatne	3	0	0	3
6	MF	(New Zealand)	Joe Bell	2	0	0	2
6	FW	(Norway)	Yann-Erik de Lanlay	2	0	0	2
6	MF	(Norway)	Kristoffer Løkberg	2	0	0	2
6	DF	(Norway)	Adrian Pereira	2	0	0	2
10	FW	(Norway)	Tommy Høiland	1	0	0	1
10	FW	(Norway)	Even Østensen	1	0	0	1
10	FW	(Norway)	Sebastian Sebulonsen	1	0	0	1
10	DF	(Norway)	Rolf Daniel Vikstøl	1	0	0	1
10	MF	(Iceland)	Samúel Friðjónsson	1	0	0	1
10			Own goal	1	0	0	1
TOTALS				54	0	0	54
