= Sondre Bjørshol =

Norwegian footballer (born 1994)

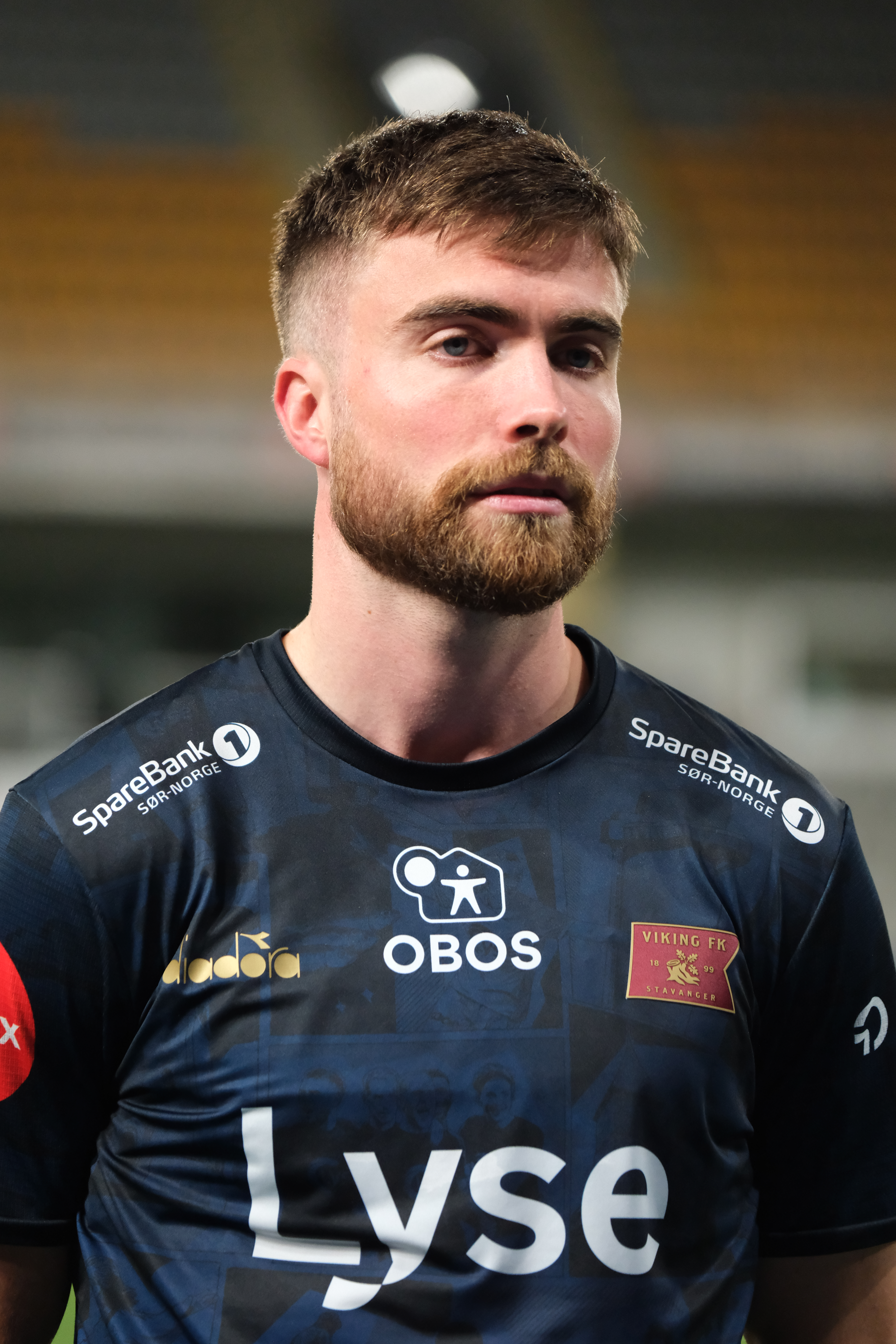
- Bjørshol with Viking in 2025

Personal information
- Full name: Sondre Flem Bjørshol
- Date of birth: 30 April 1994 (age 32)
- Place of birth: Stavanger, Norway
- Height: 1.84 m (6 ft 0 in)
- Position: Right-back

Team information
- Current team: Viking
- Number: 18

Youth career
- 2009–2013: Vidar

Senior career*
Years	Team	Apps	(Gls)
2013–2016	Vidar	38	(1)
2016–2018	Åsane	48	(1)
2018–	Viking	142	(10)
- * Club domestic league appearances and goals as of 23 July 2026

Sondre Flem Bjørshol (born 30 April 1994) is a Norwegian footballer who plays as a right-back for Viking.

== Career ==
Bjørshol was born in Stavanger and played for local club Vidar, where he won the Dana Cup in 2010. On 26 July 2016, he signed for Norwegian First Division club Åsane. On 16 August 2018, Bjørshol returned to Stavanger, signing a two-and-a-half-year contract with Viking.

Bjørshol made 17 appearances and scored two goals as Viking won the 2025 Eliteserien.

== Career statistics ==
As of match played 30 November 2025

Appearances and goals by club, season and competition
Club	Season	League			National cup		Other		Total	
Club	Season	Division	Apps	Goals	Apps	Goals	Apps	Goals	Apps	Goals
Vidar	2013	2. divisjon	2	0	0	0	—		2	0
Vidar	2014	2. divisjon	14	1	2	0	—		16	1
Vidar	2015	2. divisjon	10	0	0	0	—		10	0
Vidar	2016	2. divisjon	12	0	4	0	—		16	0
Vidar	Total		38	1	6	0	—		44	1
Åsane	2016	1. divisjon	7	0	0	0	—		7	0
Åsane	2017	1. divisjon	22	1	3	0	—		25	1
Åsane	2018	1. divisjon	19	0	1	0	—		20	0
Åsane	Total		48	1	4	0	—		52	1
Viking	2018	1. divisjon	9	0	0	0	—		9	0
Viking	2019	Eliteserien	22	0	6	0	—		28	0
Viking	2020	Eliteserien	10	0	—		1 (Note: Appearance in UEFA Europa League)	0	11	0
Viking	2021	Eliteserien	13	1	2	0	—		15	1
Viking	2022	Eliteserien	29	0	2	0	6 (Note: Appearances in UEFA Conference League)	1	37	1
Viking	2023	Eliteserien	20	4	2	2	—		22	6
Viking	2024	Eliteserien	14	2	0	0	—		14	2
Viking	2025	Eliteserien	17	2	3	0	4	1	24	3
Viking	Total		134	9	15	2	11	2	160	13
Career total			220	11	25	2	11	2	256	15

== Honours ==
Vidar

- Dana Cup: 2010

Viking

- Eliteserien: 2025
- Norwegian First Division: 2018 (Note: Sondre Bjørshol at Soccerway)
- Norwegian Football Cup: 2019
