= Harald Nilsen Tangen =

Norwegian footballer (born 2001)

Personal information
- Full name: Harald Nilsen Tangen
- Date of birth: 3 January 2001 (age 25)
- Place of birth: Stavanger, Norway
- Height: 1.77 m (5 ft 10 in)
- Position: Midfielder

Team information
- Current team: Vendsyssel
- Number: 15

Youth career
- –2013: Stavanger IF
- 2014: Vaulen
- 2015–2016: Stavanger IF
- 2016–2019: Viking

Senior career*
Years	Team	Apps	(Gls)
2018–2024	Viking	101	(11)
2019	→ Tromsdalen (loan)	6	(2)
2020	→ Åsane (loan)	17	(5)
2024–	Sarpsborg 08	30	(2)
2026	→ Notts County (loan)	11	(0)
2026–	→ Vendsyssel (loan)	2	(0)

International career^{‡}
2016	Norway U15	8	(0)
2017	Norway U16	13	(4)
2018	Norway U17	8	(0)
2019	Norway U18	2	(0)
2021	Norway U19	1	(0)
2021–2022	Norway U20	3	(0)
- * Club domestic league appearances and goals as of 29 August 2026 ‡ National team caps and goals as of 08:38, 29 April 2022 (UTC)

Harald Nilsen Tangen (born 3 January 2001) is a Norwegian footballer who plays as a midfielder for Vendsyssel, on loan from Sarpsborg 08.

== Career ==
In 2016, Nilsen Tangen signed for Viking FK. He made his league debut for the club in a 4–1 win over FK Jerv on 22 July 2018. On 29 May 2019, he was loaned out to 1. divisjon club Tromsdalen. On 26 August 2020, he was loaned out for a second time, this time to Åsane. He scored his first goal for Viking against Mjøndalen on 27 May 2021. On 5 August 2021, he signed a contract extension until the end of the 2024 season.

On 26 January 2026, Nilsen Tangen joined EFL League Two club Notts County on loan for the remainder of the season with the option to make the move permanent.

== Career statistics ==
As of match played 28 March 2026

Appearances and goals by club, season and competition
Club	Season	League			Cup		Other		Total	
Club	Season	Division	Apps	Goals	Apps	Goals	Apps	Goals	Apps	Goals
Viking	2018	1. divisjon	1	0	1	0	—		2	0
Viking	2019	Eliteserien	1	0	0	0	—		1	0
Viking	2020	Eliteserien	5	0	—		—		5	0
Viking	2021	Eliteserien	27	5	6	0	—		33	5
Viking	2022	Eliteserien	25	1	4	0	4 (Note: Appearances in UEFA Europa Conference League)	0	33	1
Viking	2023	Eliteserien	29	3	4	1	—		33	4
Viking	2024	Eliteserien	13	2	2	0	—		15	2
Viking	Total		101	11	17	1	4	0	122	12
Tromsdalen (loan)	2019	1. divisjon	6	2	2	0	—		8	2
Åsane (loan)	2020	1. divisjon	17	5	—		2 (Note: Appearances in Eliteserien play-offs)	0	19	5
Sarpsborg 08	2024	Eliteserien	9	0	0	0	—		9	0
Sarpsborg 08	2025	Eliteserien	21	2	7	0	—		28	2
Sarpsborg 08	2026	Eliteserien	0	0	0	0	—		0	0
Sarpsborg 08	Total		30	2	7	0	0	0	37	2
Notts County (loan)	2025–26	EFL League Two	11	0	0	0	—		11	0
Career total			165	20	26	1	6	0	197	21
