= Samúel Friðjónsson =

Icelandic footballer

Personal information
- Full name: Samúel Kári Friðjónsson
- Date of birth: 22 February 1996 (age 30)
- Place of birth: Reykjanesbær, Iceland
- Height: 1.85 m (6 ft 1 in)
- Position: Midfielder

Team information
- Current team: Valur
- Number: 7

Youth career
- –2013: Keflavík
- 2013–2016: Reading

Senior career*
Years	Team	Apps	(Gls)
2012–2013	Keflavík	2	(0)
2013–2016	Reading	0	(0)
2016–2020	Vålerenga	28	(3)
2019	→ Viking (loan)	28	(2)
2020	SC Paderborn	5	(0)
2020–2022	Viking	48	(7)
2022–2024	Atromitos	44	(3)
2025–2026	Stjarnan	27	(0)
2026–	Valur	22	(0)

International career^{‡}
2011–2012	Iceland U17	11	(2)
2013–2014	Iceland U19	20	(3)
2015–2018	Iceland U21	12	(1)
2018–2019	Iceland	8	(0)
- * Club domestic league appearances and goals as of 16 November 2026 ‡ National team caps and goals as of 14:31, 18 January 2020 (UTC)

Samúel Kári Friðjónsson (born 22 February 1996) is an Icelandic professional footballer who plays as a midfielder for Valur and the Iceland national team.

== Club career ==
=== Reading ===
Samúel joined Reading in March 2013 to train with the club before his two-year contract with the club began on 1 July 2013. Samúel extended his contract with Reading for another year on 22 May 2015. On 9 May 2016, Reading announced that Samúel's contract would not be renewed and that he would become a free agent at the end of his contract on 30 June 2016.

=== Vålerenga ===
On 16 June 2016, Samúel signed a three-and-a-half-year contract with Vålerenga, to start on 1 July 2016 when his Reading contract expired.

Samúel made his debut for Vålerenga on 2 July 2017, coming on as a 65th-minute substitute for Bård Finne in Vålerenga's 0–0 away draw against Brann.

==== Viking (loan) ====
On 30 January 2019, Samúel joined Viking on loan until the end of the 2019 season.

=== SC Paderborn ===
On 18 January 2020, SC Paderborn announced the signing of Samúel on a contract until 30 June 2022.

=== Viking ===
Samúel rejoined Viking in October 2020, having agreed the termination of his contract with SC Paderborn. He signed a contract until 2022.

== International career ==
Samúel represented the Icelandic U-17 national team on 11 occasions between 2011 and 2012, scoring twice, with his debut coming on 2 August 2011, in a 3–1 win over Sweden U-17. Samúel went on to represent the U-19 team twenty times between 2013 and 2014, scoring three times, with his debut coming in a 1–1 home draw against Denmark. On 26 March 2015, Samúel made his debut for the U-21 team in their 3–0 defeat to Romania. Samúel made his debut for Iceland on 11 January 2018 in an unofficial friendly against Indonesia Selection.

Samúel was called up to Iceland's 23-man squad for the 2018 FIFA World Cup on 11 May 2018.

== Career statistics ==
=== Club ===
As of match played 25 August 2022

Appearances and goals by club, season and competition
Club	Season	League			Domestic Cup (Note: All appearances in the Norwegian Football Cup)		League Cup		Continental		Total		Ref.
Club	Season	Division	Apps	Goals	Apps	Goals	Apps	Goals	Apps	Goals	Apps	Goals	Ref.
Keflavík	2012	Úrvalsdeild	0	0	0	0	1	0	–		1	0	
Keflavík	2013	Úrvalsdeild	2	0	0	0	2	0	–		4	0	
Keflavík	Total		2	0	0	0	3	0	0	0	5	0	–
Reading	2013–14	Championship	0	0	0	0	0	0	–		0	0	
Reading	2014–15	Championship	0	0	0	0	0	0	–		0	0	
Reading	2015–16	Championship	0	0	0	0	0	0	–		0	0	
Reading	Total		0	0	0	0	0	0	0	0	0	0	–
Vålerenga	2016	Eliteserien	0	0	0	0	–		–		0	0	
Vålerenga	2017	Eliteserien	11	2	2	0	–		–		13	2	
Vålerenga	2018	Eliteserien	17	1	3	0	–		–		20	1	
Vålerenga	Total		28	3	5	0	0	0	0	0	33	3	–
Viking (loan)	2019	Eliteserien	28	2	5	2	–		–		33	4	
SC Paderborn	2019–20	Bundesliga	5	0	0	0	–		–		5	0	
Viking	2020	Eliteserien	7	1	–		–		0	0	7	1	
Viking	2021	Eliteserien	25	5	3	1	–		–		28	6	
Viking	2022	Eliteserien	16	1	5	1	–		6 (Note: Appearances in UEFA Europa Conference League)	1	27	3	
Viking	Total		48	7	8	2	0	0	6	1	62	10	–
Atromitos	2022–23	Superleague Greece	28	2	3	0	–		–		31	2	
Atromitos	2023–24	Superleague Greece	9	1	0	0	–		–		9	1	
Atromitos	Total		37	3	3	0	–		–		40	3	
Career total			148	15	21	4	3	0	6	1	178	20	–

=== International ===
As of match played 17 November 2019

Appearances and goals by national team and year
National team	Year	Apps	Goals
Iceland	2018	5	0
Iceland	2019	3	0
Total		8	0

== Honours ==
Viking

- Norwegian Football Cup: 2019
