= 2022 Viking FK season =

Viking FK 2022 football season

Viking
2022 season
- Chair: Stig Christiansen
- Manager(s): Bjarte Lunde Aarsheim; Morten Jensen
- Stadium: Viking Stadion
- Eliteserien: 11th
- 2021 Norwegian Cup: Semi-final
- 2022 Norwegian Cup: Fourth round
- Europa Conference League: Play-off round
- Top goalscorer: League: Veton Berisha (8); All: Veton Berisha (11)
- Highest home attendance: 15,500 vs Jerv (16 May)
- Lowest home attendance: 3,546 vs Kristiansund (12 October)
- Average home league attendance: 9,910
Home colours	Away colours
- All statistics correct as of 13 November 2022.

The 2022 season was Viking's 4th consecutive year in the Eliteserien, and their 72nd season in the top flight of Norwegian football. The club participated in the Eliteserien, the 2021 Norwegian Football Cup, the 2022 Norwegian Football Cup and the UEFA Europa Conference League. It was the club's second season with Bjarte Lunde Aarsheim and Morten Jensen as managers.

== Squad ==
As of 12 October 2022

Note: Flags indicate national team as defined under FIFA eligibility rules; some limited exceptions apply. Players may hold more than one non-FIFA nationality.

No.	Pos.	Nation	Player
1	GK	NOR	Arild Østbø
2	DF	NOR	Herman Haugen
3	DF	NOR	Viljar Vevatne (vice-captain)
4	DF	SLO	David Brekalo
5	DF	SEN	Djibril Diop
6	MF	AUS	Gianni Stensness
7	MF	NOR	Fredrik Torsteinbø
8	MF	NOR	Markus Solbakken
9	FW	SWE	Kevin Kabran
10	MF	NOR	Zlatko Tripić (captain)
11	MF	NOR	Yann-Erik de Lanlay
12	MF	FIN	Naatan Skyttä (on loan from Toulouse)
13	GK	NOR	Magnus Rugland Ree
15	FW	NOR	Niklas Sandberg

No.	Pos.	Nation	Player
16	MF	NOR	Kristoffer Løkberg
18	DF	NOR	Sondre Bjørshol
19	MF	NOR	Sondre Auklend
20	DF	IDN	Shayne Pattynama
21	MF	NOR	Harald Nilsen Tangen
22	FW	NOR	Daniel Karlsbakk
23	DF	NOR	Rolf Daniel Vikstøl
24	FW	GUI	Maï Traoré
29	FW	NOR	Sander Svendsen
30	GK	ISL	Patrik Gunnarsson
33	DF	NOR	Vebjørn Hagen
34	DF	NOR	Kristoffer Forgaard Paulsen
35	FW	NOR	Edvin Austbø

=== Out on loan ===
Note: Flags indicate national team as defined under FIFA eligibility rules; some limited exceptions apply. Players may hold more than one non-FIFA nationality.

No.	Pos.	Nation	Player
—	DF	NOR	Sebastian Sørlie Henriksen (at Egersund)
—	MF	NOR	Heine Åsen Larsen (at Egersund)

No.	Pos.	Nation	Player
—	MF	NOR	Lars Erik Sødal (at Sandnes Ulf)
—	FW	NOR	Simen Kvia-Egeskog (at Skeid)

== Transfers ==
=== Transfers in ===
Date	Pos.	Name	From	Fee	Ref.
1 January 2022	FW	(Norway) Daniel Karlsbakk	Bryne	Free transfer	
11 January 2022	MF	(Norway) Niklas Sandberg	Haugesund	Undisclosed	
17 January 2022	GK	(Iceland) Patrik Gunnarsson	(England) Brentford	Undisclosed	
7 February 2022	MF	(Norway) Markus Solbakken	Stabæk	Undisclosed	
29 August 2022	FW	(Norway) Sander Svendsen	(Denmark) OB	Undisclosed	
31 August 2022	DF	(Senegal) Djibril Diop	(Morocco) Hassania Agadir	Undisclosed	

=== Transfers out ===
Date	Pos.	Name	To	Fee	Ref.
1 January 2022	GK	(Norway) Iven Austbø	Retired		
1 January 2022	GK	(Norway) Trym Sølvberg Ur	Sola	Free transfer	
1 January 2022	MF	(Norway) Johnny Furdal	Retired		
1 January 2022	FW	(Norway) Tommy Høiland	Sandnes Ulf	Free transfer	
31 January 2022	MF	(New Zealand) Joe Bell	(Denmark) Brøndby	Undisclosed	
14 July 2022	DF	(Norway) Sebastian Sebulonsen	(Denmark) Brøndby	Undisclosed	
23 July 2022	FW	(Norway) Veton Berisha	(Sweden) Hammarby	Undisclosed	
30 August 2022	MF	(Iceland) Samúel Friðjónsson	(Greece) Atromitos	Undisclosed	

=== Loans in ===
Start date	Pos.	Name	From	End date	Ref.
26 August 2022	MF	(Finland) Naatan Skyttä	(France) Toulouse	End of season	

=== Loans out ===
Start date	Pos.	Name	To	End date	Ref.
10 February 2022	DF	(Norway) Herman Haugen	Raufoss	14 July 2022	
9 March 2022	DF	(Norway) Sebastian Sørlie Henriksen	Egersund	End of season	
9 March 2022	MF	(Norway) Heine Åsen Larsen	Egersund	End of season	
14 March 2022	MF	(Norway) Lars Erik Sødal	Sandnes Ulf	End of season	
2 September 2022	FW	(Norway) Simen Kvia-Egeskog	Skeid	End of season	

== Friendlies ==
=== Pre-season ===
The following friendly matches were played in pre-season.

27 January 2022 Friendly	Jablonec (Czech Republic)	2–2	(Norway) Viking	Marbella, Spain
12:00 CET	Silný 68'; Smejkal 90'	Report	Vevatne 6'; Karlsbakk 52'	Referee: Jose Miguel Aranda Zayas

5 February 2022 Friendly	Viking	2–0	Bryne	Stavanger, Norway
14:00 CET	Kabran 21'; Berisha 46'	Report		Stadium: Viking Stadion; Attendance: 1,000; Referee: Mischa Kellerhals

13 February 2022 Friendly	Real Salt Lake (United States)	1–4	(Norway) Viking	Portland, Oregon, United States
15:00 PST	Kreilach 46'	Report	Sandberg 9'; Kabran 48', 60'; Auklend 67'	Stadium: Providence Park; Attendance: 200

16 February 2022 Friendly	Portland Timbers (United States)	1–3	(Norway) Viking	Portland, Oregon, United States
19:45 PST	Rasmussen 45'	Report	Løkberg 11', 37'; Brekalo 71'	Stadium: Providence Park; Attendance: 4,000

19 February 2022 Friendly	Minnesota United (United States)	2–2	(Norway) Viking	Portland, Oregon, United States
14:30 PST	Amarilla 77'; Lod 83'	Report	Sandberg 19'; Tripić 80'	Stadium: Providence Park; Attendance: 200

23 February 2022 Friendly	Portland Pilots (United States)	0–3	(Norway) Viking	Portland, Oregon, United States
11:00 PST		Report	Torsteinbø 44'; Sandberg 65'; Sebulonsen 69'

4 March 2022 Friendly	Viking	1–2	Egersund	Stavanger, Norway
11:30 CET	Traoré 40'	Report	Michalsen 55'; Hammershaug 80'	Stadium: Viking Stadion; Attendance: 100; Referee: Amir Ajjour

6 March 2022 Friendly	Viking	4–1	Kristiansund	Stavanger, Norway
15:00 CET	Pattynama 8', 78'; Sandberg 57'; Friðjónsson 90'	Report	Bye 12'	Stadium: Viking Stadion; Attendance: 750; Referee: Mischa Kellerhals

27 March 2022 Friendly	Viking	1–0	Haugesund	Stavanger, Norway
18:00 CEST	Tripić 62' (pen.)	Report		Stadium: Viking Stadion; Referee: Daniel Higraff

== Competitions ==
=== Eliteserien ===
==== Table ====
Pos	Team	Pld	W	D	L	GF	GA	GD	Pts
9	Aalesund	30	10	9	11	32	45	−13	39
10	Haugesund	30	10	8	12	42	46	−4	38
11	Viking	30	9	8	13	48	54	−6	35
12	Strømsgodset	30	9	6	15	44	55	−11	33
13	HamKam	30	6	13	11	33	43	−10	31

Source: Football Association of Norway (in Norwegian)
Rules for classification: 1) Points; 2) Goal difference; 3) Goals scored; 4) Head-to-head points; 5) Head-to-head goal difference; 6) Head-to-head goals scored.

==== Results summary ====
Overall								Home						Away					
Pld	W	D	L	GF	GA	GD	Pts	W	D	L	GF	GA	GD	W	D	L	GF	GA	GD
30	9	8	13	48	54	−6	35	5	5	5	21	19	+2	4	3	8	27	35	−8

Source: see below

==== Results by round ====
Round	1	2	3	4	5	6	7	8	9	10	11	12	13	14	15	16	17	18	19	20	21	22	23	24	25	26	27	28	29	30
Ground	A	H	A	H	A	H	A	H	A	H	A	H	A	H	A	H	A	H	A	H	A	A	H	A	H	H	A	H	A	H
Result	W	W	L	W	W	W	D	D	L	L	L	D	W	W	L	W	D	D	L	L	L	W	D	L	L	L	D	L	L	D
Position	3	2	5	2	1	1	2	2	3	3	6	8	5	4	5	5	5	5	6	6	6	6	6	7	8	9	10	11	11	11

Source: NIFS
A = Away; H = Home; W = Win; D = Draw; L = Loss

==== Matches ====
The Eliteserien fixtures were announced on 14 January 2022. Round 16, 18 and 19 were moved from their original dates.

3 April 2022 1	Sarpsborg 08	0–1	Viking	Sarpsborg
18:00 CEST		Report	Tripić 88'	Stadium: Sarpsborg Stadion; Attendance: 4,307; Referee: Christian Moen

10 April 2022 2	Viking	1–0	Aalesund	Stavanger
20:00 CEST	Tripić 71'	Report		Stadium: Viking Stadion; Attendance: 8,832; Referee: Espen Eskås

18 April 2022 3	Odd	2–1	Viking	Skien
18:00 CEST	Ingebrigtsen 51'; Jevtović 90+4'	Report	Kabran 87'	Stadium: Skagerak Arena; Attendance: 4,908; Referee: Sivert Amland

24 April 2022 4	Viking	2–0	Bodø/Glimt	Stavanger
18:00 CEST	Tripić 25'; Sebulonsen 66'	Report		Stadium: Viking Stadion; Attendance: 15,304; Referee: Tore Hansen

30 April 2022 16	Viking	5–1	Haugesund	Stavanger
18:00 CEST	Berisha 26', 41', 50'; Sebulonsen 89', 90+3'	Report	Ndour 20'	Stadium: Viking Stadion; Attendance: 10,571; Referee: Christian Moen
Note: The match was originally scheduled for 31 July 2022.

7 May 2022 5	Molde	3–4	Viking	Molde
18:00 CEST	Kaasa 13'; Brynhildsen 24'; Eikrem 27'	Report	Løkberg 29'; Berisha 62' (pen.), 82'; Tangen 71'	Stadium: Aker Stadion; Attendance: 6,190; Referee: Kristoffer Hagenes

12 May 2022 18	Viking	0–0	Strømsgodset	Stavanger
19:00 CEST		Report		Stadium: Viking Stadion; Attendance: 10,110; Referee: Marius Hansen Grøtta
Note: The match was originally scheduled for 14 August 2022.

16 May 2022 6	Viking	3–0	Jerv	Stavanger
18:00 CEST	Berisha 72' (pen.); Brekalo 83'; Traoré 85'	Report		Stadium: Viking Stadion; Attendance: 15,500; Referee: Kai Erik Steen

22 May 2022 7	Tromsø	1–1	Viking	Tromsø
18:00 CEST	Brekalo 90+2' (o.g.)	Report	Sebulonsen 73'	Stadium: Alfheim Stadion; Attendance: 2,219; Referee: Mohammad Usman Aslam

25 May 2022 8	Viking	1–1	HamKam	Stavanger
18:00 CEST	Sandberg 9'	Report	Solbakken 62' (o.g.)	Stadium: Viking Stadion; Attendance: 8,543; Referee: Marius Lien

28 May 2022 9	Strømsgodset	3–2	Viking	Drammen
18:00 CEST	Hove 21'; Salvesen 51'; Stengel 56' (pen.)	Report	Berisha 37' (pen.), 70'	Stadium: Marienlyst Stadion; Attendance: 5,124; Referee: Svein Tore Sinnes

19 June 2022 10	Viking	1–2	Sandefjord	Stavanger
18:00 CEST	Løkberg 43'	Report	Ofkir 60'; Tveter 70'	Stadium: Viking Stadion; Attendance: 9,086; Referee: Svein Oddvar Moen

25 June 2022 11	Haugesund	4–2	Viking	Haugesund
16:00 CEST	Ndour 7', 51'; Vevatne 83' (o.g.); Vikstøl 90+1' (o.g.)	Report	Karlsbakk 3'; Friðjónsson 19' (pen.)	Stadium: Haugesund Stadion; Attendance: 5,608; Referee: Rohit Saggi

3 July 2022 12	Viking	1–1	Rosenborg	Stavanger
20:00 CEST	Pereira 65' (o.g.)	Report	Vecchia 28'	Stadium: Viking Stadion; Attendance: 9,221; Referee: Tore Hansen

10 July 2022 13	Lillestrøm	0–1	Viking	Lillestrøm
18:00 CEST		Report	Ogbu 90' (o.g.)	Stadium: Åråsen Stadion; Attendance: 6,964; Referee: Kristoffer Hagenes

17 July 2022 14	Viking	2–1	Kristiansund	Stavanger
18:00 CEST	Kabran 52'; Sandberg 88' (pen.)	Report	Bye 51'	Stadium: Viking Stadion; Attendance: 7,431; Referee: Kai Erik Steen

24 July 2022 15	Vålerenga	4–2	Viking	Oslo
18:00 CEST	Sahraoui 27'; Bjørdal 31' (pen.), 39'; Christensen 90+6'	Report	Solbakken 10'; Vevatne 81'	Stadium: Intility Arena; Attendance: 6,432; Referee: Tom Harald Hagen

7 August 2022 17	Sandefjord	2–2	Viking	Sandefjord
18:00 CEST	Ofkir 8'; Chaib 20'	Report	Kabran 61'; Haugen 84'	Stadium: Sandefjord Arena; Attendance: 2,913; Referee: Marius Lien

28 August 2022 20	Viking	1–2	Vålerenga	Stavanger
18:00 CEST	Austbø 69'	Report	Sahraoui 34', 54'	Stadium: Viking Stadion; Attendance: 9,244; Referee: Kristoffer Hagenes

31 August 2022 19	Kristiansund	2–1	Viking	Kristiansund
19:00 CEST	Moumbagna 16', 41'	Report	Tripić 39' (pen.)	Stadium: Kristiansund Stadion; Attendance: 3,536; Referee: Tom Harald Hagen
Note: The match was originally scheduled for 21 August 2022.

4 September 2022 21	Rosenborg	4–1	Viking	Trondheim
18:00 CEST	Sæter 1', 49'; Tengstedt 37', 46'	Report	Traoré 88'	Stadium: Lerkendal Stadion; Attendance: 10,737; Referee: Ola Hobber Nilsen

11 September 2022 22	HamKam	1–2	Viking	Hamar
18:00 CEST	Bjørlo 7'	Report	Løkberg 8'; Svendsen 79'	Stadium: Briskeby Arena; Attendance: 4,562; Referee: Kai Erik Steen

18 September 2022 23	Viking	2–2	Tromsø	Stavanger
18:00 CEST	Vikstøl 11'; Traoré 90+2'	Report	Psyché 47'; Kamanzi 87'	Stadium: Viking Stadion; Attendance: 9,532; Referee: Sivert Amland

2 October 2022 24	Aalesund	2–1	Viking	Ålesund
17:00 CEST	Rafn 61'; Golubović 72'	Report	Tripić 56' (pen.)	Stadium: Color Line Stadion; Attendance: 4,729; Referee: Mohammad Usman Aslam

9 October 2022 25	Viking	0–3	Lillestrøm	Stavanger
17:00 CEST		Report	Knudsen 18'; Olsen 47', 58'	Stadium: Viking Stadion; Attendance: 12,136; Referee: Espen Eskås

16 October 2022 26	Viking	0–1	Sarpsborg 08	Stavanger
17:00 CEST		Report	Heintz 39'	Stadium: Viking Stadion; Attendance: 7,136; Referee: Marius Lien

23 October 2022 27	Jerv	2–2	Viking	Grimstad
17:00 CEST	Diallo 59'; Norheim 80'	Report	Brekalo 70'; Traoré 75'	Stadium: Levermyr Stadion; Attendance: 2,254; Referee: Ola Hobber Nilsen

30 October 2022 28	Viking	1–4	Molde	Stavanger
19:00 CET	Diop 56'	Report	Fofana 2', 58'; Knudtzon 43'; Ødegård 82'	Stadium: Viking Stadion; Attendance: 7,937; Referee: Christian Moen

6 November 2022 29	Bodø/Glimt	5–4	Viking	Bodø
17:00 CET	Pellegrino 4'; Vetlesen 22', 83'; Espejord 69'; Grønbæk 79'	Report	Karlsbakk 12'; Løkberg 32'; Kabran 54', 66'	Stadium: Aspmyra Stadion; Attendance: 6,879; Referee: Ola Hobber Nilsen

13 November 2022 30	Viking	1–1	Odd	Stavanger
17:00 CET	de Lanlay 43'	Report	Hoff 59'	Stadium: Viking Stadion; Attendance: 8,065; Referee: Tommy Skjerven

=== Norwegian Cup ===
==== 2021 ====
12 March 2022 Fourth round	Kongsvinger	0–2	Viking	Kongsvinger
15:00 CET		Report	Tripić 1'; Friðjónsson 46'	Stadium: Gjemselund Stadion; Attendance: 1,765; Referee: Espen Eskås

19 March 2022 Quarter-final	KFUM	0–5	Viking	Oslo
16:15 CET		Report	Berisha 2', 69'; Kabran 23'; Sandberg 84', 90+2'	Stadium: Intility Arena; Attendance: 1,627; Referee: Sigurd Smehus Kringstad

21 April 2022 Semi-final	Bodø/Glimt	2–1	Viking	Bodø
20:10 CEST	Espejord 17'; Koomson 38'	Report	Berisha 12' (pen.)	Stadium: Aspmyra Stadion; Attendance: 5,123; Referee: Ola Hobber Nilsen

==== 2022 ====
The pair-ups for the first round were announced on 7 April 2022. The pair-ups for the second round were announced on 23 May 2022. The draw for the third round was made on 23 June 2022. The match between Viking and Kristiansund was originally scheduled for 29 June, but it was postponed due to flight cancellations caused by an airline strike.

19 May 2022 First round	Rosseland	1–6	Viking	Bryne
18:00 CEST	V. Hovland 56'	Report	P. Time 2' (o.g.); Kabran 4'; Sebulonsen 14'; Austbø 48'; Sandberg 51' (pen.); Traoré 81'	Stadium: Rosseland Kunstgress; Attendance: 1,000; Referee: Ola Kellerhals

22 June 2022 Second round	Vard	1–2	Viking	Haugesund
18:00 CEST	Barane 65'	Report	de Lanlay 8'; Vevatne 85'	Stadium: Haugesund Stadion; Attendance: 614; Referee: Mischa Kellerhals

12 October 2022 Third round	Viking	1–0 (a.e.t.)	Kristiansund	Stavanger
18:00 CEST	Brekalo 104'	Report		Stadium: Viking Stadion; Attendance: 3,546; Referee: Steinar Hauge

=== UEFA Europa Conference League ===
==== Qualifying phase and play-off round ====
Second qualifying round

The draw for the second qualifying round was made on 15 June 2022.

21 July 2022 First leg	Sparta Prague (Czech Republic)	0–0	(Norway) Viking	Prague, Czech Republic
19:00 CEST		Report		Stadium: Stadion Letná; Attendance: 12,667; Referee: Manfredas Lukjančukas (Lithuania)

28 July 2022 Second leg	Viking (Norway)	2–1 (2–1 agg.)	(Czech Republic) Sparta Prague	Stavanger, Norway
19:00 CEST	Vevatne 45'; Traoré 90+2'	Report	Zelený 42'	Stadium: Viking Stadion; Attendance: 8,300; Referee: Visar Kastrati (Kosovo)

Third qualifying round

4 August 2022 First leg	Viking (Norway)	5–1	(Republic of Ireland) Sligo Rovers	Stavanger, Norway
19:00 CEST	Tripić 4'; Friðjónsson 8'; Traoré 53'; Sandberg 60'; Austbø 86'	Report	Cawley 89' (pen.)	Stadium: Viking Stadion; Attendance: 11,645; Referee: Radu Petrescu (Romania)

11 August 2022 Second leg	Sligo Rovers (Republic of Ireland)	1–0 (2–5 agg.)	(Norway) Viking	Sligo, Ireland
20:00 CEST	Fitzgerald 44'	Report		Stadium: The Showgrounds; Attendance: 3,879; Referee: Novak Simović (Serbia)

Play-off round

18 August 2022 First leg	FCSB (Romania)	1–2	(Norway) Viking	Bucharest, Romania
20:30 CEST	Coman 3'	Report	Kabran 5'; Bjørshol 35'	Stadium: Arena Națională; Attendance: 30,134; Referee: Giorgi Kruashvili (Georgia)

25 August 2022 Second leg	Viking (Norway)	1–3 (3–4 agg.)	(Romania) FCSB	Stavanger, Norway
19:00 CEST	Tripić 26' (pen.)	Report	Edjouma 2'; Cordea 54'; Radunović 90+4' (pen.)	Stadium: Viking Stadion; Attendance: 14,104; Referee: Tamás Bognár (Hungary)

== Squad statistics ==
As of match played 13 November 2022

=== Appearances and goals ===
No.	Pos	Nat	Player	Total		Eliteserien		Norwegian Cup		Europa Conference League	
No.	Pos	Nat	Player	Apps	Goals	Apps	Goals	Apps	Goals	Apps	Goals
1	GK	(Norway) NOR	Arild Østbø	5	0	2	0	3	0	0	0
2	DF	(Norway) NOR	Herman Haugen	13	1	12	1	1	0	0	0
3	DF	(Norway) NOR	Viljar Vevatne	32	3	22	1	4	1	6	1
4	DF	(Slovenia) SLO	David Brekalo	36	3	26	2	4	1	6	0
5	DF	(Senegal) SEN	Djibril Diop	8	1	7	1	1	0	0	0
6	MF	(Australia) AUS	Gianni Stensness	22	0	18	0	4	0	0	0
7	MF	(Norway) NOR	Fredrik Torsteinbø	18	0	14	0	1	0	3	0
8	MF	(Norway) NOR	Markus Solbakken	38	1	27	1	5	0	6	0
9	FW	(Sweden) SWE	Kevin Kabran	41	8	30	5	5	2	6	1
10	FW	(Norway) NOR	Zlatko Tripić	30	8	20	5	4	1	6	2
11	MF	(Norway) NOR	Yann-Erik de Lanlay	27	2	21	1	4	1	2	0
12	MF	(Finland) FIN	Naatan Skyttä	11	0	10	0	1	0	0	0
15	FW	(Norway) NOR	Niklas Sandberg	36	6	24	2	6	3	6	1
16	MF	(Norway) NOR	Kristoffer Løkberg	32	4	22	4	5	0	5	0
18	DF	(Norway) NOR	Sondre Bjørshol	39	1	29	0	4	0	6	1
19	MF	(Norway) NOR	Sondre Auklend	3	0	1	0	2	0	0	0
20	DF	(Indonesia) IDN	Shayne Pattynama	29	0	18	0	5	0	6	0
21	MF	(Norway) NOR	Harald Nilsen Tangen	33	1	24	1	5	0	4	0
22	FW	(Norway) NOR	Daniel Karlsbakk	30	2	21	2	3	0	6	0
23	DF	(Norway) NOR	Rolf Daniel Vikstøl	19	1	12	1	3	0	4	0
24	FW	(Guinea) GUI	Maï Traoré	32	7	23	4	4	1	5	2
26	FW	(Norway) NOR	Simen Kvia-Egeskog	4	0	2	0	1	0	1	0
29	FW	(Norway) NOR	Sander Svendsen	12	1	11	1	1	0	0	0
30	GK	(Iceland) ISL	Patrik Gunnarsson	37	0	28	0	3	0	6	0
34	DF	(Norway) NOR	Kristoffer Forgaard Paulsen	2	0	0	0	2	0	0	0
35	FW	(Norway) NOR	Edvin Austbø	11	3	7	1	2	1	2	1
44	MF	(Norway) NOR	Kasper Sætherbø	1	0	0	0	1	0	0	0
Players who left Viking during the season:
14	FW	(Norway) NOR	Veton Berisha	15	11	12	8	3	3	0	0
17	DF	(Norway) NOR	Sebastian Sebulonsen	20	5	15	4	5	1	0	0
27	MF	(Iceland) ISL	Samúel Friðjónsson	27	3	16	1	5	1	6	1
