= Sander Svendsen =

Norwegian footballer (born 1997)

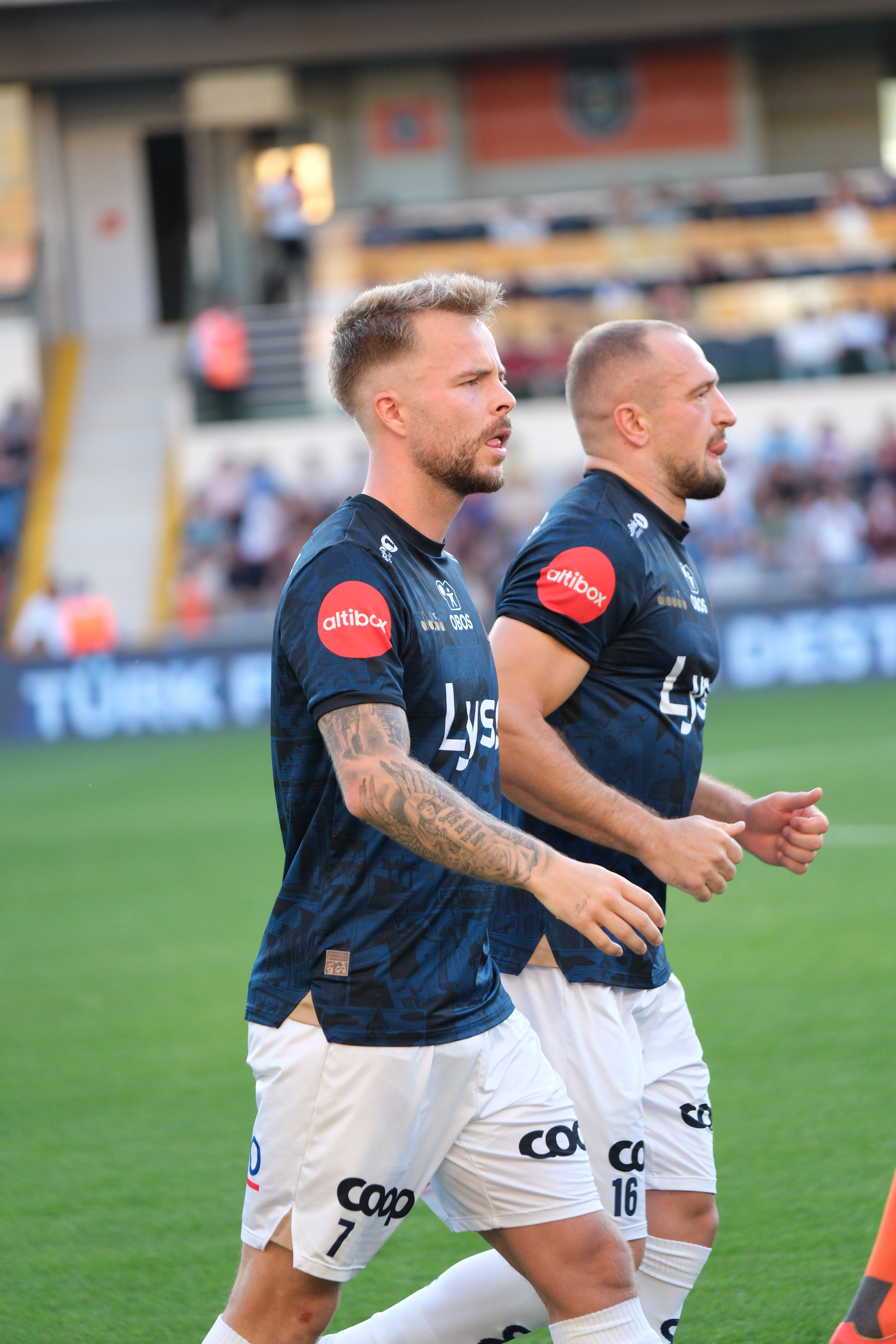
- Svendsen with Viking in 2025

Personal information
- Date of birth: 6 August 1997 (age 29)
- Place of birth: Molde, Norway
- Height: 1.74 m (5 ft 9 in)
- Positions: Forward; winger

Team information
- Current team: Kristiansund
- Number: 7

Youth career
- Molde

Senior career*
Years	Team	Apps	(Gls)
2013–2017	Molde	80	(17)
2017–2019	Hammarby	29	(6)
2019	→ Odd (loan)	15	(0)
2019–2022	OB	54	(17)
2020	→ Brann (loan)	10	(1)
2021	→ Odd (loan)	28	(8)
2022–2025	Viking	92	(15)
2026	Konyaspor	11	(0)
2026–	Kristiansund	8	(1)

International career
2012	Norway U15	7	(4)
2013	Norway U16	9	(4)
2014	Norway U17	7	(4)
2014–2015	Norway U18	8	(1)
2014–2017	Norway U19	4	(1)
2015–2017	Norway U21	8	(0)
- * Club domestic league appearances and goals as of 17 October 2026

Sander Svendsen (born 6 August 1997) is a Norwegian professional footballer who plays as a forward or a winger for Eliteserien club Kristiansund.

== Early life ==
Sander Svendsen was born in Molde, and started to play football at a young age at the local club Molde FK. Both his parents, mother Ellen and father Svend Jarle, had represented the club at senior level. At age 14, Svendsen began to train regularly with Molde's senior team.

== Club career ==
=== Molde FK ===
Svendsen made his first team debut on 9 May 2013, aged only 15, against Aalesund in a 4–1 win. He was brought on shortly before the final whistle by manager Ole Gunnar Solskjær. He scored his first competitive goal for the side on 21 April 2014, in a 5–1 win against Sarpsborg. Aged 16 years and 259 days, he is the fifth-youngest goalscorer in Eliteserien history. Amid his breakthrough at Molde, Svendsen trialed with the Dutch giants Ajax on several occasions. At the end of 2013, however, Svendsen signed a new three-year contract with Molde.

In 2014, Svendsen became the youngest player ever to win the Norwegian top flight, Eliteserien. Molde secured the championship title following a 2–1 victory against Viking on 4 October. Svendsen made 12 league appearances throughout the campaign. The same year, The Guardian rated him as one of the most promising football players in Europe born in 1997. The Danish newspaper BT also named Svendsen as one of the 20 best Scandinavian players under the age of 20.

Sander Svendsen made his continental debut during the 2014–15 UEFA Europa League, on 24 July 2014, in a 1–1 draw against the Slovenian club Gorica in the second qualifying round. He scored his first goal in the tournament in the third qualifying round about a week later, against Zorya Luhansk from Ukraine on away turf. The game finished 1–1 as Svendsen scored a late equalizer in the 88th minute.

In 2015, Svendsen played 26 league games for Molde. He scored a brace in a local derby against Aalesund on 20 April, in a 5–1 win. He scored another two goals on 16 May, in a 3–3 draw against Stabæk. At the end of the season, Svendsen was prized as the domestic "Talent of the Year" by the Norwegian Football Association. Roughly at the same time, Svendsen also renewed his contract with Molde, with his new deal lasting until the end of 2017.

During the upcoming season, Svendsen made 25 league appearances for Molde and scored 4 goals. He was used as a utility player, appearing as a striker, winger and central midfielder throughout the 2016 season. In April 2017, Tuttosport named Svendsen as one of the 98 best young players in Europe under the age of 21. The Italian newspaper nominated Svendsen for the Golden Boy award.

=== Hammarby IF ===
On 11 August 2017, Sander Svendsen transferred to Hammarby IF in Allsvenskan. The transfer fee was reportedly set at around 4 million Swedish kronor (approximately £0,4 million), as Svendsen only had six months left on his previous contract with Molde. Svendsen signed a four-year deal with the Stockholm-based side. He made his debut for the club only a few days later in a 2–2 home draw against Östersund, coming on as a second half sub. Svendsen scored his first competitive goal for the club on 16 August, in a 3–1 win against Akropolis IF in round 2 of the 2017–18 Svenska Cupen. On 21 August, he scored his first goal in Allsvenskan, in a 3–0 away win against Örebro SK. Svendsen scored his first brace for Hammarby in a 3–3 home draw against IK Sirius on 23 October. He scored another two goals, and also provided one assist, as Hammarby won 4–1 away against GIF Sundsvall on 29 October.

==== Odd (loan) ====
On 26 March 2019, Odds BK announced the signing of Svendsen on a loan deal until the summer.

=== OB ===
On 8 July 2019, Danish Superliga club OB announced that they had agreed to sign Svendsen on a four-year contract from Hammarby. He completed the move on 16 July, after seeing out his loan spell with Odd. His arrival reunited him with head coach Jakob Michelsen, who had coached him previously at Hammarby.

Svendsen made his OB debut on 22 July 2019, coming on as a 61st-minute substitute in a 4–1 home win against Lyngby at Nature Energy Park. With the match level at 1–1 upon his introduction, he scored twice to give OB a 3–1 lead, marking an immediate impact on his first competitive appearance for the club.

==== Loan to Brann ====
On the last day of the transfer window 2020, SK Brann announced that they had signed Svendsen on a six-month loan deal.

==== Second loan to Odd ====
On 19 April 2021, Odd announced the signing of Svendsen on a loan deal. On 16 August 2021, Odd confirmed that Svendsen had returned to OB. However, on 31 August 2021, it was confirmed that the loan-spell at Odd had been extended until the end of 2021.

=== Viking ===
On 29 August 2022, Viking FK announced the signing of Svendsen on a three-and-a-half-year contract. He made 24 appearances and scored two goals as Viking won the 2025 Eliteserien.

=== Konyaspor ===
On 3 January 2026, Svendsen signed a one-and-a-half-year contract with Süper Lig club Konyaspor.

== International career ==
From 2012 and onwards, Svendsen has won caps for several of the Norwegian youth national teams. For example, he established himself as a prolific member of the U17's in 2014, scoring 4 goals in 7 matches throughout the year.

Svendsen made his debut for the Norwegian U21s on 13 June 2015, aged 17, in a 2–0 win against Bosnia and Herzegovina in the 2017 UEFA European Under-21 Championship qualification.

== Style of play ==
Sander Svendsen has been prized for his great ball control and vision, with fine technique and dribbling skills. His former teammate at Molde, Mattias Moström, has compared Svendsen's style of play to that of Lionel Messi. "He can shoot with both feet ... He is excellent in small spaces, gets past his opponent and then a swift finish", Moström said.

== Personal life ==
He is the older brother of fellow footballer Tobias Svendsen, a midfielder born in 1999. The duo played together at Molde between 2015 and 2017.

== Career statistics ==
=== Club ===
As of match played 22 May 2026

Appearances and goals by club, season and competition
Club	Season	League			National Cup		Continental		Total	
Club	Season	Division	Apps	Goals	Apps	Goals	Apps	Goals	Apps	Goals
Molde	2013	Eliteserien	2	0	1	0	–		3	0
Molde	2014	Eliteserien	12	1	3	3	2 (Note: Appearances in UEFA Europa League)	1	17	5
Molde	2015	Eliteserien	26	8	4	2	6 (Note: Three appearances in UEFA Champions League, three appearances in UEFA Europa League)	0	36	10
Molde	2016	Eliteserien	25	4	2	1	2	0	29	5
Molde	2017	Eliteserien	15	4	3	1	0	0	18	5
Molde	Total		80	17	13	7	10	1	103	25
Hammarby	2017	Allsvenskan	10	6	1	1	–		11	7
Hammarby	2018	Allsvenskan	19	0	4	1	–		23	1
Hammarby	2019	Allsvenskan	0	0	3	1	–		3	1
Hammarby	Total		29	6	8	3	–		37	9
Odd (loan)	2019	Eliteserien	15	0	3	1	–		18	1
OB	2019–20	Danish Superliga	32	13	1	0	–		33	13
OB	2020–21	Danish Superliga	2	0	1	0	–		3	0
OB	2021–22	Danish Superliga	13	4	3	0	–		16	4
OB	2022–23	Danish Superliga	7	0	0	0	–		7	0
OB	Total		54	17	5	0	–		59	17
Brann (loan)	2020	Eliteserien	10	1	–		–		10	1
Odd (loan)	2021	Eliteserien	28	8	3	2	–		31	10
Viking	2022	Eliteserien	11	1	2	1	–		13	2
Viking	2023	Eliteserien	30	5	4	2	–		34	7
Viking	2024	Eliteserien	27	7	3	1	–		30	8
Viking	2025	Eliteserien	24	2	6	2	4 (Note: Appearances in UEFA Conference League)	6	34	10
Viking	Total		92	15	15	6	4	6	111	27
Konyaspor	2025–26	Süper Lig	11	0	5	1	–		16	1
Kristiansund	2026	Eliteserien	0	0	0	0	–		0	0
Career total			319	64	52	20	14	7	385	91

== Honours ==
Molde

- Eliteserien: 2014
- Norwegian Football Cup: 2013, 2014

Viking

- Eliteserien: 2025

=== Individual ===
- Talent of the Year in Norway: 2015
