= Djibril Diop (footballer) =

Senegalese footballer

Personal information
- Full name: Djibril Thialaw Diop
- Date of birth: 6 January 1999 (age 27)
- Place of birth: Thiès, Senegal
- Height: 1.88 m (6 ft 2 in)
- Position: Centre-back

Team information
- Current team: Hapoel Be'er Sheva
- Number: 44

Youth career
- 2013–2017: Génération Foot

Senior career*
| Years | Team | Apps | (Gls) |
| 2017–2021 | Génération Foot | | |
| 2021–2022 | Hassania Agadir | 24 | (2) |
| 2022–2024 | Viking | 42 | (2) |
| 2024–2025 | Yverdon-Sport | 16 | (0) |
| 2025– | Hapoel Be'er Sheva | 31 | (1) |

International career^{‡}
| 2019– | Senegal | 4 | (0) |
- * Club domestic league appearances and goals as of 22:55, 26 October 2026 (UTC) ‡ National team caps and goals as of 13:02, 19 October 2026 (UTC)

Djibril Thialaw Diop (born 6 January 1999) is a Senegalese professional footballer who plays as a centre-back for Israeli club Hapoel Be'er Sheva and the Senegal national team.

== Career ==
Born in Thiès, Senegal, Diop started his career with Génération Foot in 2013. He made his senior debut for the club in 2017. In August 2021, he signed a two-year contract with Moroccan Botola club Hassania Agadir. On 31 August 2022, the last day of the summer transfer window, he signed a four-and-a-half-year contract with Norwegian Eliteserien club Viking. On 2 October 2022, he made his debut for the club in a 2–1 loss against Aalesund.

On September 11, 2025, Diop signed a three-year contract with Hapoel Be'er Sheva of the Israeli Premier League.

== International career ==
On 28 July 2019, he made his international debut for Senegal in a 2020 African Nations Championship qualification match against Liberia.

== Career statistics ==
As of match played 5 February 2025

Appearances and goals by club, season and competition
| Club | Season | League | | | Cup | | Continental | | Other | | Total | |
| Club | Season | Division | Apps | Goals | Apps | Goals | Apps | Goals | Apps | Goals | Apps | Goals |
|---|---|---|---|---|---|---|---|---|---|---|---|---|
| Hassania Agadir | 2021–22 | Botola | 24 | 2 | 0 | 0 | — | | — | | 24 | 2 |
| Viking | 2022 | Eliteserien | 7 | 1 | 2 | 0 | — | | — | | 9 | 1 |
| Viking | 2023 | Eliteserien | 24 | 1 | 4 | 1 | — | | — | | 28 | 2 |
| Viking | 2024 | Eliteserien | 11 | 0 | 2 | 0 | — | | — | | 13 | 0 |
| Viking | Total | | 42 | 2 | 8 | 1 | — | | — | | 50 | 3 |
| Yverdon-Sport | 2024–25 | Swiss Super League | 8 | 0 | 1 | 0 | — | | — | | 9 | 0 |
| Career total | | | 74 | 4 | 9 | 1 | 0 | 0 | 0 | 0 | 83 | 5 |

== Honours ==
Hapoel Beer Sheva

- Israeli Premier League: 2025–26
