= Jefferson de Souza =

Norwegian footballer (born 1995)

Personal information
- Full name: Jefferson David Concalo de Souza
- Date of birth: 27 September 1995 (age 31)
- Position: Forward

Team information
- Current team: Brodd
- Number: 9

Youth career
- –2012: Viking
- 2012: Sandnes Ulf
- 2013: Viking
- 2014: Sandnes Ulf

Senior career*
Years	Team	Apps	(Gls)
2013	Vardeneset	2	(0)
2015	Sola	8	(1)
2016–2018	Brodd	59	(18)
2019	Nest-Sotra	13	(0)
2019	Brodd	8	(4)
2020	Viking	6	(0)
2021	Egersund	3	(0)
2021–	Brodd	35	(11)
- * Club domestic league appearances and goals as of 13:27, 24 October 2022 (UTC)

Jefferson David Concalo de Souza (born 27 September 1995) is a Norwegian footballer who plays as a forward for Brodd.

== Career ==
On 6 February 2020, de Souza signed a one-year contract with Eliteserien club Viking FK. After the 2020 season, his contract expired and he left the club. On 11 March 2021, he signed for 2. divisjon club Egersund. He returned to his former club Brodd a couple of months later.

== Career statistics ==
As of match played 23 October 2022

Appearances and goals by club, season and competition
Club	Season	League			Cup		Continental		Total	
Club	Season	Division	Apps	Goals	Apps	Goals	Apps	Goals	Apps	Goals
Vardeneset	2013	3. divisjon	2	0	0	0	–		2	0
Sola	2015	2. divisjon	8	1	0	0	–		8	1
Brodd	2016	3. divisjon	23	5	1	0	–		24	5
Brodd	2017	3. divisjon	18	9	1	0	–		19	9
Brodd	2018	3. divisjon	18	4	1	2	–		19	6
Brodd	Total		59	18	3	2	–		62	20
Nest-Sotra	2019	1. divisjon	13	0	1	0	–		14	0
Brodd	2019	3. divisjon	8	4	0	0	–		8	4
Viking	2020	Eliteserien	6	0	–		0	0	6	0
Egersund	2021	2. divisjon	3	0	1	0	–		4	0
Brodd	2021	3. divisjon	9	2	0	0	–		9	2
Brodd	2022	3. divisjon	26	9	1	0	–		27	9
Brodd	Total		35	11	1	0	–		36	11
Career total			134	34	6	2	0	0	140	36
