= Michael Crowe (footballer) =

Welsh footballer

Personal information
- Full name: Michael Thomas Tallaksen Crowe
- Date of birth: 13 November 1995 (age 31)
- Place of birth: Bexleyheath, England
- Position: Goalkeeper

Team information
- Current team: Våg
- Number: 1

Youth career
- –2012: Start
- 2012–2013: Ipswich Town

Senior career*
Years	Team	Apps	(Gls)
2012	Start 2	9	(0)
2013–2018	Ipswich Town	0	(0)
2015	→ Woking (loan)	4	(0)
2015–2016	→ Stevenage (loan)	0	(0)
2016	→ Braintree Town (loan)	6	(0)
2018–2020	Preston North End	0	(0)
2020	→ Bamber Bridge (loan)	0	(0)
2020	Viking	1	(0)
2021–2022	Randesund	1	(0)
2022–2023	Birkenes	37	(0)
2024–2025	Randesund	22	(0)
2026–	Våg	16	(0)

International career^{‡}
2013–2014	Wales U19	5	(0)
2016	Wales U21	1	(0)
- * Club domestic league appearances and goals as of 14:14, 17 August 2026 (UTC) ‡ National team caps and goals as of 15:25, 18 February 2019 (UTC)

Michael Thomas Tallaksen Crowe (born 13 November 1995) is a professional footballer who plays as a goalkeeper for Våg.

== Club career ==
Crowe began his youth career with Norwegian club IK Start. On 24 May 2012, it was announced that he would join the academy of Championship club Ipswich Town in July 2012. On 5 September 2013, he signed his first professional contract with the club, lasting two years. After making no appearances for the first team, on 24 March 2015 he was loaned to Woking in the Conference Premier, where he made four league appearances. He returned to Ipswich at the end of the season, also extending his contract for another year until June 2016 with an option for an additional season.

On 26 November 2015, League Two club Stevenage signed Crowe on loan until January 2016. After making no appearances for Stevenage, he returned to Ipswich Town before he subsequently moved to Braintree Town in the National League on a one-month loan. He made six league appearances for Braintree, along with an appearance in the FA Trophy, before returning to Ipswich in February. He extended his contract with the club for another season on 29 June 2016, again with an option to extend for an additional year. In July 2016, he began a trial with League Two side Portsmouth during the club's pre-season training camp before returning to Ipswich. On 3 May 2017, Ipswich exercised the option in Crowe's contract and renewed the agreement with Crowe for the 2017–18 season.

On 6 June 2018, it was announced that fellow Championship club Preston North End had agreed a deal to sign Crowe on a two-year deal from the beginning of July. He made his professional debut for the club on 6 January 2019, starting in the third round of the 2018–19 FA Cup against League One side Doncaster Rovers, which finished as a 1–3 loss.

In August 2020, he was brought to his first senior side in Norway, Viking FK, as an intended third-choice goalkeeper. After the 2020 season, his contract expired and he left the club. In 2021 he played two matches for Randesund in the Norwegian Fourth Division. In August 2022 he was playing for Birkenes IL.

== International career ==
Crowe chose to represent Wales at international level, which he qualifies for through a Welsh-born grandmother. He was also eligible to represent England through his father or Norway through his mother. He began in the Wales under-19 team, making five appearances in qualifying for the 2014 UEFA European Under-19 Championship. On 11 October 2016, he made his debut for the under-21 team against Armenia in 2017 UEFA European Under-21 Championship qualification, which finished as a 3–1 win for Wales.

On 15 March 2018, he received his first call-up for the senior national team when he was included in the Welsh squad for the 2018 China Cup friendly tournament. The call-up came after Danny Ward, Wales' second choice goalkeeper, was unable to travel with the team after his passport got lost in the post during his visa application. Wales finished as runners-up after losing in the final against Uruguay, though Crowe did not appear in the tournament.

== Personal life ==
Crowe was born in Bexleyheath, Greater London to an English father and Norwegian mother. At the age of two he moved to Norway, where he was raised.

== Career statistics ==
As of match played 6 December 2020

Club	Season	League			FA Cup		EFL Cup		Other		Total	
Club	Season	Division	Apps	Goals	Apps	Goals	Apps	Goals	Apps	Goals	Apps	Goals
Ipswich Town
Ipswich Town	2014–15	Championship	0	0	0	0	0	0	0	0	0	0
Ipswich Town	2015–16	Championship	0	0	0	0	0	0	—		0	0
Ipswich Town	2016–17	Championship	0	0	0	0	0	0	—		0	0
Ipswich Town	2017–18	Championship	0	0	0	0	0	0	—		0	0
Ipswich Town	Total		0	0	0	0	0	0	0	0	0	0
Woking (loan)	2014–15	Conference Premier	4	0	0	0	—		0	0	4	0
Stevenage (loan)	2015–16	League Two	0	0	0	0	0	0	0	0	0	0
Braintree Town (loan)	2015–16	National League	6	0	0	0	—		1 (Note: Appearance in FA Trophy)	0	7	0
Preston North End	2018–19	Championship	0	0	1	0	0	0	—		1	0
Preston North End	2019–20	Championship	0	0	0	0	0	0	—		0	0
Preston North End	Total		0	0	1	0	0	0	0	0	1	0
Viking	2020	Eliteserien	1	0	0	0	—		0	0	1	0
Career total			11	0	1	0	0	0	1	0	13	0
