= Sebastian Sebulonsen =

Norwegian footballer (born 2000)

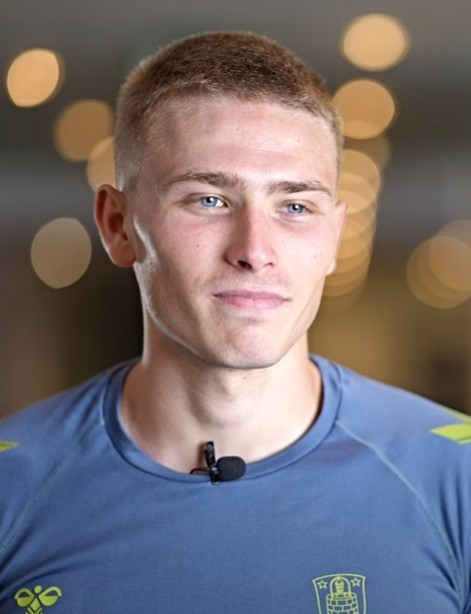
- Sebulonsen in 2022

Personal information
- Full name: Sebastian Søraas Sebulonsen
- Date of birth: 27 January 2000 (age 26)
- Place of birth: Sola Municipality, Norway
- Height: 1.87 m (6 ft 2 in)
- Position: Right-back

Team information
- Current team: 1. FC Köln
- Number: 28

Youth career
- 2012–2017: Sola

Senior career*
Years	Team	Apps	(Gls)
2016–2019	Sola	65	(18)
2020–2022	Viking	59	(9)
2021	→ Mjøndalen (loan)	4	(0)
2022–2025	Brøndby	61	(3)
2025–	1. FC Köln	36	(0)

International career^{‡}
2021–2023	Norway U21	19	(1)
2025–	Norway	1	(0)
- * Club domestic league appearances and goals as of 1 November 2026 ‡ National team caps and goals as of 14 October 2025

Sebastian Søraas Sebulonsen (born 27 January 2000) is a Norwegian professional footballer who plays as a right-back for German Bundesliga club 1. FC Köln and the Norway national team.

== Club career ==
=== Sola ===
Born in Sola Municipality, Rogaland, Norway, Sebulonsen started playing football for hometown club Sola FK as a 13-year-old. After progressing through the youth teams of the club, he made his senior debut on 24 September 2016, aged 16, in a Norwegian Second Division match against Florø. On 1 July 2017, he scored his first goal at senior level, contributing to a 4–1 away victory against Express in the Norwegian Third Division. At the end of his tenure at the club, Sebulonsen had scored 18 goals in 67 appearances for Sola.

=== Viking ===
On 12 December 2019, Sebulonsen signed a two-year contract with Eliteserien club Viking. On 21 June 2020, he made his league debut for the club in a 3–0 loss against Brann, replacing Johnny Furdal in the 68th minute. On 29 November, he scored his first goal for the club, opening the score with a header in the 20th minute, helping Viking to a comfortable 4–1 victory against Start.

On 11 May 2021, his contract was extended for two more years, keeping him at Viking until December 2023. The next day, he was loaned out to fellow Eliteserien club Mjøndalen. There he made four appearances, putting in impressive performances, including one against his parent club Viking, where he provided an assist. On 9 June 2021, Viking recalled him from his loan. He scored 11 goals in 67 appearances during his time at Viking.

=== Brøndby ===
On 14 July 2022, Danish Superliga club Brøndby announced the signing of Sebulonsen on a four-year contract. He made his debut on 17 July, starting at right-back in a 1–0 league win over AGF. His European debut came four days later in a 1–1 draw in the UEFA Conference League qualifier against Polish side Pogoń Szczecin. He initially established himself as the club's first-choice right-back, but was later used more frequently as a substitute before regaining more regular involvement during the championship round, although not consistently as a starter. Brøndby finished fifth overall and failed to qualify for European competition the following season.

Sebulonsen did not establish himself as a regular starter during the 2023–24 season either, and was mainly a backup to Sean Klaiber. Brøndby entered the final matchday of the Danish Superliga in first place, but a 3–2 defeat against AGF ended their title hopes. Sebulonsen scored the temporary 2–2 equaliser in the 64th minute. At the same time, rivals Midtjylland drew 3–3 with Silkeborg, meaning a draw would have been sufficient for Brøndby to secure the championship.

In his third season at the club, Sebulonsen established himself as a regular starter, primarily as a right midfielder and right wing-back. Brøndby finished as runners-up and entered the second qualifying round of the UEFA Conference League, eliminating Llapi before being knocked out by Legia Warsaw in the third qualifying round. They ultimately placed third in the league, while Sebulonsen made 38 appearances and scored twice in all competitions. He left the club with three goals in 77 appearances.

=== 1. FC Köln ===
On 18 July 2025, Sebulonsen signed a three-year contract with Bundesliga club 1. FC Köln.

== International career ==
Sebulonsen represented the Norway national under-21 team and was part of the squad that qualified for the 2023 UEFA European Under-21 Championship. He was included in Norway's tournament squad, appearing in all three group matches as the team finished bottom of their group.

On 12 October 2025, Sebulonsen received his first call-up to the Norway national team after being added to the squad by national team coach Ståle Solbakken for an upcoming friendly against New Zealand. He made his senior international debut in that match on 14 October 2025, a 1–1 draw in Oslo, coming on as a 64th-minute substitute for Marcus Holmgren Pedersen.

== Career statistics ==
=== Club ===
As of match played 1 November 2026

Appearances and goals by club, season and competition
Club	Season	League			National cup (Note: Includes Norwegian Cup, Danish Cup)		Europe		Other		Total	
Club	Season	Division	Apps	Goals	Apps	Goals	Apps	Goals	Apps	Goals	Apps	Goals
Sola	2016	2. divisjon	1	0	0	0	—		—		1	0
Sola	2017	3. divisjon	16	3	0	0	—		—		16	3
Sola	2018	3. divisjon	24	6	1	0	—		—		25	6
Sola	2019	2. divisjon	24	9	1	0	—		—		25	9
Sola	Total		65	18	2	0	—		—		67	18
Viking	2020	Eliteserien	20	1	—		0	0	—		20	1
Viking	2021	Eliteserien	24	4	3	1	—		—		27	5
Viking	2022	Eliteserien	15	4	5	1	0	0	—		20	5
Viking	Total		59	9	8	2	0	0	—		67	11
Mjøndalen (loan)	2021	Eliteserien	4	0	0	0	—		—		4	0
Brøndby	2022–23	Danish Superliga	19	1	1	0	4 (Note: Appearances in UEFA Conference League)	0	—		24	1
Brøndby	2023–24	Danish Superliga	13	1	2	0	—		—		15	1
Brøndby	2024–25	Danish Superliga	28	1	6	0	4	0	—		38	1
Brøndby	Total		60	3	9	0	8	0	—		77	3
1. FC Köln	2025–26	Bundesliga	31	0	2	0	—		—		33	0
1. FC Köln	2026–27	Bundesliga	5	0	1	1	—		—		6	1
1. FC Köln	Total		36	0	3	1	—		—		39	1
Career total			224	30	22	3	8	0	0	0	254	33

=== International ===
As of match played 14 October 2025

Appearances and goals by national team and year
National team	Year	Apps	Goals
Norway	2025	1	0
Total		1	0
