= Kristoffer Forgaard Paulsen =

Norwegian footballer (born 2004)

Personal information
- Full name: Kristoffer Forgaard Paulsen
- Date of birth: 31 January 2004 (age 22)
- Height: 1.92 m (6 ft 4 in)
- Position: Centre-back

Youth career
- 2009–2022: Viking

Senior career*
Years	Team	Apps	(Gls)
2020–2025	Viking	3	(0)
2021–2022	Viking 2	23	(1)
2023	→ KA (loan)	5	(0)
2023	→ Junkeren (loan)	11	(1)
2024	→ Sogndal (loan)	8	(0)

International career^{‡}
2019	Norway U15	1	(0)
2020	Norway U16	3	(0)
2022–	Norway U18	4	(0)
- * Club domestic league appearances and goals as of 14 November 2024 ‡ National team caps and goals as of 15:33, 14 November 2022 (UTC)

Kristoffer Forgaard Paulsen (born 31 January 2004) is a former Norwegian footballer who played as a centre-back. .

== Career ==
Forgaard Paulsen joined the academy of Viking at the age of 5. On 27 August 2020, he signed a three-year contract with the club. On 28 November 2020, at the age of 16, he made his Eliteserien debut in a 4–1 win against Start. Forgaard Paulsen has featured for the Norwegian national under-15 and under-16 teams.

== Career statistics ==
As of 11 September 2025

Appearances and goals by club, season and competition
Club	Season	League			Cup		Europe		Total	
Club	Season	Division	Apps	Goals	Apps	Goals	Apps	Goals	Apps	Goals
Viking	2020	Eliteserien	1	0	—		0	0	1	0
Viking	2021	Eliteserien	1	0	1	0	—		2	0
Viking	2022	Eliteserien	0	0	2	0	0	0	2	0
Viking	2024	Eliteserien	1	0	2	1	—		3	1
Viking	Total		3	0	5	1	0	0	8	1
KA (loan)	2023	Besta deild karla	5	0	1	0	0	0	6	0
Junkeren (loan)	2023	2. divisjon	11	1	0	0	—		11	1
Sogndal (loan)	2024	1. divisjon	8	0	0	0	—		8	0
Career total			27	1	6	1	0	0	33	2
