= Sebastian Sørlie Henriksen =

Norwegian footballer (born 2002)

Personal information
- Full name: Sebastian Sørlie Henriksen
- Date of birth: 31 May 2002 (age 24)
- Position: Centre-back

Team information
- Current team: Vidar
- Number: 25

Youth career
- 2007–2021: Viking

Senior career*
Years	Team	Apps	(Gls)
2020–2022	Viking	1	(0)
2020	→ Fram Larvik (loan)	5	(0)
2022	→ Egersund (loan)	15	(0)
2023–2024	Grorud	37	(1)
2025–	Vidar	23	(1)

International career^{‡}
2017	Norway U15	4	(0)
2018	Norway U16	7	(0)
2019	Norway U17	7	(0)
2020	Norway U18	3	(0)
- * Club domestic league appearances and goals as of 3 February 2025 ‡ National team caps and goals as of 3 February 2025

Sebastian Sørlie Henriksen (born 31 May 2002) is a Norwegian footballer who plays as a centre-back for Vidar.

== Career ==
Sørlie Henriksen joined the academy of Viking at the age of 5. On 15 May 2020, he signed a three-year contract with the club. Sørlie Henriksen has featured for Norwegian national youth teams from under-15 to under-18 level. On 8 August 2020, he was loaned out to Norwegian Second Division club Fram Larvik. He made his Eliteserien debut on 12 December 2021 against Tromsø. In March 2022, he was loaned out to Egersund.
