= 2018 Ranheim Fotball season =

Ranheim
2018 season
- Manager: Svein Maalen
- Stadium: EXTRA Arena
- Eliteserien: 7th
- Norwegian Cup: Fourth Round vs Strømsgodset
- Top goalscorer: League: Mads Reginiussen (9); All: Michael Karlsen (11)
| Home colours | Away colours |

The 2018 season was Ranheim Fotball's first season in the Eliteserien following their promotion. They finished the season in 7th position and reached the Fourth Round of the Norwegian Cup.

== Squad ==
Note: Flags indicate national team as defined under FIFA eligibility rules; some limited exceptions apply. Players may hold more than one non-FIFA nationality.

| No. | Pos. | Nation | Player |
|---|---|---|---|
| 1 | GK | NOR | Even Barli |
| 3 | DF | NOR | Daniel Kvande |
| 4 | DF | NOR | Karl Morten Eek |
| 5 | DF | NOR | Øyvind Alseth |
| 6 | MF | NOR | Magnus Blakstad |
| 7 | MF | NOR | Mads Reginiussen (Captain) |
| 8 | MF | NOR | Magnus Stamnestrø |
| 9 | FW | NOR | Michael Karlsen |
| 10 | FW | NOR | Øyvind Storflor |
| 11 | MF | NOR | Eirik Valla Dønnem |
| 12 | GK | NOR | Magnus Lenes |
| 13 | FW | NOR | Joachim Olufsen |

| No. | Pos. | Nation | Player |
|---|---|---|---|
| 14 | FW | NOR | Mats Lillebo |
| 15 | MF | NOR | Erik Tønne |
| 16 | MF | NOR | Kristoffer Løkberg |
| 17 | MF | NOR | Sondre Sørløkk |
| 18 | DF | NOR | Ivar Furu |
| 20 | FW | NOR | Kim Ove Riksvold |
| 21 | MF | NOR | Jacob Tromsdal |
| 22 | FW | NOR | Sivert Solli |
| 23 | DF | NOR | Aslak Fonn Witry |
| 24 | DF | NOR | Aleksander Foosnæs |
| 26 | FW | NOR | Ola Solbakken |
| 27 | FW | NOR | Andreas Helmersen (on loan from Rosenborg) |

=== Out on loan ===
Note: Flags indicate national team as defined under FIFA eligibility rules; some limited exceptions apply. Players may hold more than one non-FIFA nationality.

| No. | Pos. | Nation | Player |
|---|---|---|---|
| 19 | DF | NOR | Glenn Walker (at Stjørdals-Blink) |
| 25 | MF | NOR | Marius Augdal (at Stjørdals-Blink) |
| — | FW | NOR | Andreas Rye (at Stjørdals-Blink) |

== Transfers ==
=== In ===
| Date | Position | Nationality | Name | From | Fee | Ref. |
|---|---|---|---|---|---|---|
| 17 November 2017 | FW | (Norway) | Joachim Olufsen | Strindheim | Undisclosed | |
| 24 November 2017 | DF | (Norway) | Ivar Furu | Byåsen | Undisclosed | |
| 5 December 2017 | MF | (Norway) | Marius Augdal | Stjørdals-Blink | Undisclosed | |
| 20 December 2017 | MF | (Norway) | Sivert Solli | Rosenborg | Undisclosed | |
| 21 December 2017 | MF | (Norway) | Eirik Valla Dønnem | Byåsen | Undisclosed | |
| 22 December 2017 | MF | (Norway) | Erik Tønne | Levanger | Undisclosed | |
| 2 January 2018 | MF | (Norway) | Glenn Walker | Rosenborg | Undisclosed | |
| 3 January 2018 | FW | (Norway) | Ola Solbakken | Rosenborg | Undisclosed | |
| 4 February 2018 | DF | (Norway) | Øyvind Alseth | Toronto | Undisclosed | |
| 16 July 2018 | MF | (Norway) | Magnus Stamnestrø | Rosenborg | Undisclosed | |

=== Loans in ===
| Date from | Position | Nationality | Name | From | Date to | Ref. |
|---|---|---|---|---|---|---|
| 21 February 2018 | FW | (Norway) | Andreas Helmersen | Rosenborg | End of Season | |

=== Out ===
| Date | Position | Nationality | Name | To | Fee | Ref. |
|---|---|---|---|---|---|---|
| 15 November 2017 | GK | (Norway) | Daniel Hagen | Egersund | Undisclosed | |
| 21 December 2017 | GK | (Norway) | Alexander Hovdevik | Byåsen | Undisclosed | |
| 24 December 2017 | FW | (Norway) | Georg Flatgård | Elverum | Undisclosed | |
| 14 August 2018 | MF | (Norway) | Simen Raaen Sandmæl | Levanger | Undisclosed | |
| 15 August 2018 | DF | (Norway) | Christian Eggen Rismark | Brann | Undisclosed | |

=== Loans out ===
| Date from | Position | Nationality | Name | to | Date to | Ref. |
|---|---|---|---|---|---|---|
| 24 March 2018 | MF | (Norway) | Marius Augdal | Stjørdals-Blink | End of Season | |
| 26 July 2018 | DF | (Norway) | Glenn Walker | Stjørdals-Blink | End of Season | |

== Competitions ==
=== Eliteserien ===
==== Results summary ====
| Overall | | | | | | | | Home | | | | | | Away | | | | | |
| Pld | W | D | L | GF | GA | GD | Pts | W | D | L | GF | GA | GD | W | D | L | GF | GA | GD |
|---|---|---|---|---|---|---|---|---|---|---|---|---|---|---|---|---|---|---|---|
| 30 | 12 | 6 | 12 | 43 | 50 | −7 | 42 | 8 | 4 | 3 | 29 | 20 | +9 | 4 | 2 | 9 | 14 | 30 | −16 |

Last updated: 24 November 2018.
Source: see below

==== Results by round ====
| Round | 1 | 2 | 3 | 4 | 5 | 6 | 7 | 8 | 9 | 10 | 11 | 12 | 13 | 14 | 15 | 16 | 17 | 18 | 19 | 20 | 21 | 22 | 23 | 24 | 25 | 26 | 27 | 28 | 29 | 30 |
|---|---|---|---|---|---|---|---|---|---|---|---|---|---|---|---|---|---|---|---|---|---|---|---|---|---|---|---|---|---|---|
| Ground | A | H | A | H | A | H | H | A | H | A | H | A | H | A | H | A | H | A | H | A | A | H | A | H | A | H | H | A | H | A |
| Result | W | W | L | W | W | L | D | D | W | W | W | L | W | L | W | L | L | D | D | W | L | D | L | W | L | D | W | L | L | L |
| Position | 14 | 9 | 5 | 6 | 4 | 3 | 5 | 5 | 4 | 3 | 3 | 3 | 2 | 3 | 3 | 4 | 6 | 6 | 6 | 4 | 5 | 5 | 5 | 5 | 5 | 5 | 5 | 6 | 6 | 7 |

Updated to match(es) played on 24 November 2018. Source: see below
A = Away; H = Home; W = Win; D = Draw; L = Loss

==== Results ====
| 10 March 2018 1 | Ranheim | – | Brann | Trondheim |
| 18:00 CET (UTC+1) | | Report | | Stadium: EXTRA Arena |
Note: Match postponed due to a frozen pitch.

| 11 April 2018 2 | Sandefjord | 1–2 | Ranheim | Sandefjord |
| 18:30 CEST (UTC+2) | Ofkir 30'; Olsen (yellow card) 75' | Report | Løkberg (yellow card) 35'; Rismark 78'; Tromsdal (yellow card) 86'; Helmersen 89'; Furu (yellow card) 90+3' | Stadium: Komplett Arena; Attendance: 2,461; Referee: Trond Ivar Døvle |

| 2 April 2018 3 | Ranheim | 4–1 | Stabæk | Trondheim |
| 18:00 CEST (UTC+2) | Løkberg 1', 20'; Rismark (yellow card) 10'; Karlsen (yellow card) 46' (goal) 49', 59' (pen.) | Report | Omoijuanfo 53'; Mandé (yellow card) 59'; Brochmann (yellow card) 73'; Moe (yellow card) 85' | Stadium: EXTRA Arena; Attendance: 2,125; Referee: Tom Harald Hagen |

| 8 April 2018 4 | Tromsø | 4–0 | Ranheim | Tromsø |
| 18:00 CEST (UTC+2) | Åsen 48', 66'; Nilsen 74'; Vuk 83' | Report | Foosnæs (yellow card) 28'; Storflor (yellow card) 66'; Sandmæl (yellow card) 73' | Stadium: Alfheim Stadion; Attendance: 3,028; Referee: Kristoffer Hagenes |

| 15 April 2018 5 | Ranheim | 4–2 | Haugesund | Trondheim |
| 18:00 CEST (UTC+2) | Reginiussen 6', 67'; Storflor 16'; Tønne 84' | Report | Stølås 19'; Grindheim 62' | Stadium: EXTRA Arena; Attendance: 2,040; Referee: Tommy Skjerven |

| 22 April 2018 6 | Lillestrøm | 0–1 | Ranheim | Lillestrøm |
| 18:00 CEST (UTC+2) | Amundsen (yellow card) 41'; Olsen (yellow card) 42' | Report | Kvande (yellow card) 25'; Løkberg (yellow card) 31'; Alseth (yellow card) 60'; Reginiussen 62' | Stadium: Åråsen Stadion; Attendance: 5,184; Referee: Rohit Saggi |

| 25 April 2018 1 | Ranheim | 0–2 | Brann | Trondheim |
| 18:30 CET (UTC+1) | Karlsen (yellow card) 38'; Reginiussen (yellow card) 50' | Report | Skålevik 24', 55'; Barmen (yellow card) 59' | Stadium: EXTRA Arena; Attendance: 2,655; Referee: Trygve Kjensli |
Note: Match originally scheduled for 10 March.

| 28 April 2018 7 | Ranheim | 2–2 | Vålerenga | Trondheim |
| 18:00 CEST (UTC+2) | Løkberg 19'; Tønne 60' | Report | Johnson 27', 85'; Ibrahim (yellow card) 33'; Näsberg (yellow card) 51' (yellow-red card) 90+4' | Stadium: EXTRA Arena; Attendance: 2,068; Referee: Kristoffer Hagenes |

| 5 May 2018 8 | Rosenborg | 1–1 | Ranheim | Trondheim |
| 18:00 CEST (UTC+2) | de Lanlay 55' | Report | Karlsen (yellow card) 18'; Reginiussen 78' | Stadium: Lerkendal Stadion; Attendance: 21,201; Referee: Svein Oddvar Moen |

| 13 May 2018 9 | Ranheim | 3–1 | Odd | Trondheim |
| 18:00 CEST (UTC+2) | Reginiussen 41', 75'; Storflor 44'; Løkberg (yellow card) 84' | Report | Broberg 20' | Stadium: EXTRA Arena; Attendance: 2,013; Referee: Ola Hobber Nilsen |

| 16 May 2018 10 | Kristiansund | 1–3 | Ranheim | Kristiansund |
| 18:00 CEST (UTC+2) | Sørli (yellow card) 61'; P.Ulvestad (yellow card) 81'; Bamba 88' | Report | Tønne 22', 62' (pen.); Witry 84' | Stadium: Kristiansund Stadion; Attendance: 4,234; Referee: Rohit Saggi |

| 21 May 2018 11 | Ranheim | 3–1 | Molde | Trondheim |
| 18:00 CEST (UTC+2) | Reginiussen 49' (yellow card) 69'; Riksvold 60'; Witry (yellow card) 61'; Karlsen (yellow card) 74' (goal) 75'; Helmersen (yellow card) 84' | Report | Sarr 23'; Hussain (yellow card) 85' | Stadium: EXTRA Arena; Attendance: 2,655; Referee: Kristoffer Hagenes |

| 27 May 2018 12 | Bodø/Glimt | 4–0 | Ranheim | Bodø |
| 18:00 CEST (UTC+2) | Saltnes 5'; Evjen 48'; Zinckernagel 60'; Layouni 75' | Report | | Stadium: Aspmyra Stadion; Attendance: 2,961; Referee: Tom Harald Hagen |

| 10 June 2018 13 | Ranheim | 2–1 | Sarpsborg 08 | Trondheim |
| 18:00 CEST (UTC+2) | Dønnem (yellow card) 55'; Karlsen (yellow card) 61' (goal) 70' (pen.); Løkberg 89' | Report | Halvorsen 16' (yellow card) 84'; Singh (yellow card) 61' | Stadium: EXTRA Arena; Attendance: 2,039; Referee: Trygve Kjensli |

| 24 June 2018 14 | Strømsgodset | 3–0 | Ranheim | Drammen |
| 18:00 CEST (UTC+2) | Pedersen 9'; Jradi 42'; Andersen 64'; Júnior (yellow card) 65' | Report | | Stadium: Marienlyst Stadion; Attendance: 5,431; Referee: Tore Hansen |

| 1 July 2018 15 | Ranheim | 2–0 | Start | Trondheim |
| 18:00 CEST (UTC+2) | Dønnem 34'; Løkberg (yellow card) 55'; Karlsen 58' (penalty missed) 81'; Reginiussen (yellow card) 84' | Report | Wichne (yellow card) 33'; Finnbogason (yellow card) 80'; Berger (yellow card) 85' | Stadium: EXTRA Arena; Attendance: 1,600; Referee: Kai Erik Steen |

| 8 July 2018 16 | Sarpsborg 08 | 4–1 | Ranheim | Sarpsborg |
| 18:00 CEST (UTC+2) | Zachariassen 6'; Askar 34'; Halvorsen 45+3' (pen.), 66' (pen.); Muhammed (yellow card) 62' | Report | Dønnem (yellow card) 38'; Rismark (yellow card) 45+2'; Stamnestrø 57'; Barli (yellow card) 65' | Stadium: Sarpsborg Stadion; Attendance: 4,100; Referee: Rohit Saggi |

| 4 August 2018 17 | Ranheim | 1–3 | Rosenborg | Trondheim |
| 18:00 CEST (UTC+2) | Tønne 36' | Report | Jensen 12'; Trondsen 26'; Lundemo 77' | Stadium: EXTRA Arena; Attendance: 2,919; Referee: Tommy Skjerven |

| 12 August 2018 18 | Start | 0–0 | Ranheim | Kristiansand |
| 18:00 CEST (UTC+2) | Käck (yellow card) 58'; Sandberg (yellow card) 80' | Report | Witry (yellow card) 58' | Stadium: Sør Arena; Attendance: 3,714; Referee: Espen Eskås |

| 19 August 2018 19 | Ranheim | 1–1 | Sandefjord | Trondheim |
| 18:00 CEST (UTC+2) | Løkberg 54' | Report | Engblom 12'; Vales (yellow card) 46'; Storbæk (yellow card) 90+5' | Stadium: EXTRA Arena; Attendance: 1,393; Referee: Trond Ivar Døvle |

| 26 August 2018 20 | Molde | 2–3 | Ranheim | Molde |
| 18:00 CEST (UTC+2) | E.Hestad 58'; Aursnes (yellow card) 76'; Chukwu 90+2' | Report | Karlsen 56'; Helmersen 84'; Tønne 86'; Witry (yellow card) 90+2' | Stadium: Aker Stadion; Attendance: 6,864; Referee: Trygve Kjensli |

| 2 September 2018 21 | Brann | 1–0 | Ranheim | Bergen |
| 18:00 CEST (UTC+2) | Larsen 59'; Haugen (yellow card) 72' | Report | | Stadium: Brann Stadion; Attendance: 9,764; Referee: Tore Hansen |

| 16 September 2018 22 | Ranheim | 1–1 | Strømsgodset | Trondheim |
| 18:00 CEST (UTC+2) | Helmersen 28' | Report | Glesnes (yellow card) 33'; Pellegrino (yellow card) 88'; Nguen 90+2' | Stadium: EXTRA Arena; Attendance: 1,582; Referee: Kai Erik Steen |

| 23 September 2018 23 | Stabæk | 3–2 | Ranheim | Bærum |
| 18:00 CEST (UTC+2) | Boli 38' (pen.), 83'; Keita 87' | Report | Furu (yellow card) 25' (red card) 37'; Foosnæs (yellow card) 29'; Reginiussen 34', 60'; Alseth (yellow card) 75' | Stadium: Nadderud Stadion; Attendance: 3,161; Referee: Tommy Skjerven |

| 30 September 2018 24 | Ranheim | 2–1 | Kristiansund | Trondheim |
| 18:00 CEST (UTC+2) | Sørløkk (yellow card) 64'; Karlsen 69' (pen.), 74' (pen.) (penalty missed) 86'; Løkberg (yellow card) 89' | Report | Coly 32' (yellow card) 74'; Aasmundsen (yellow card) 35' | Stadium: EXTRA Arena; Attendance: 2,030; Referee: Tom Harald Hagen |

| 7 October 2018 25 | Odd | 2–0 | Ranheim | Skien |
| 18:00 CEST (UTC+2) | Hoff (yellow card) 31'; Ruud (yellow card) 52'; Hagen 76'; Furu 78' (o.g.) | Report | Reginiussen (yellow card) 37'; Furu (yellow card) 59' | Stadium: Skagerak Arena; Attendance: 4,762; Referee: Sigurd Smehus Kringstad |

| 21 October 2018 26 | Ranheim | 0–0 | Bodø/Glimt | Trondheim |
| 18:00 CEST (UTC+2) | Foosnæs (yellow card) 88' | Report | Zinckernagel (yellow card) 27'; Evjen (yellow card) 80' | Stadium: EXTRA Arena; Attendance: 1,601; Referee: Tommy Skjerven |

| 28 October 2018 27 | Ranheim | 3–2 | Lillestrøm | Trondheim |
| 18:00 CET (UTC+1) | Tønne 34' (yellow card) 90+3'; Løkberg 38'; Witry 53' | Report | Rafn 12'; Mathew 83' | Stadium: EXTRA Arena; Attendance: 1,825; Referee: Sigurd Kringstad |

| 4 November 2018 28 | Haugesund | 2–0 | Ranheim | Haugesund |
| 18:00 CET (UTC+1) | Grindheim (yellow card) 33' (goal) 53'; Tronstad 41' | Report | Reginiussen (yellow card) 75' | Stadium: Haugesund Stadion; Attendance: 3,430; Referee: Trygve Kjensli |

| 11 November 2018 29 | Ranheim | 1–2 | Tromsø | Trondheim |
| 18:00 CET (UTC+1) | Foosnæs 57' | Report | Berntsen 8', 34'; Norbye (yellow card) 86' | Stadium: EXTRA Arena; Attendance: 1,729; Referee: Kristoffer Hagenes |

| 24 November 2018 30 | Vålerenga | 2–1 | Ranheim | Oslo |
| 18:00 CET (UTC+1) | Finne 51', 53' | Report | Dønnem (yellow card) 58'; Storflor 90+2' | Stadium: Intility Arena; Attendance: 7,860; Referee: Rohit Saggi |

==== Table ====
| Pos | Team | Pld | W | D | L | GF | GA | GD | Pts |
|---|---|---|---|---|---|---|---|---|---|
| 5 | Kristiansund | 30 | 13 | 7 | 10 | 46 | 41 | +5 | 46 |
| 6 | Vålerenga | 30 | 11 | 9 | 10 | 39 | 44 | −5 | 42 |
| 7 | Ranheim | 30 | 12 | 6 | 12 | 43 | 50 | −7 | 42 |
| 8 | Sarpsborg 08 | 30 | 11 | 8 | 11 | 46 | 39 | +7 | 41 |
| 9 | Odd | 30 | 11 | 7 | 12 | 39 | 38 | +1 | 40 |

Source: Football Association of Norway (in Norwegian), Soccerway
Rules for classification: 1) Points; 2) Goal difference; 3) Goals scored; 4) Head-to-head points; 5) Head-to-head goal difference; 6) Head-to-head away goals scored (only if between two teams); 7) Head-to-head goals scored; 8) Play-off (only used to decide champions or relegation).

=== Norwegian Cup ===
| 18 April 2018 First Round | Kvik | 0–1 | Ranheim | Trondheim |
| 18:00 CEST (UTC+2) | J.Rønning (yellow card) 65' | Report | Helmersen 68' (pen.) | Stadium: Rosenborgbanen; Attendance: 292; Referee: Henrikke Nervik |

| 1 May 2018 Second Round | Orkla | 1–3 | Ranheim | Orkanger |
| 18:00 CEST (UTC+2) | S.Valø (yellow card) 51'; Helgetun 74'; O.Løkken (yellow card) | Report | Karlsen 10'; Kvande 44'; Solli 86' | Stadium: Orkdalsbanken Stadion; Attendance: 872; Referee: Mads Skarsem |

| 9 May 2018 Third Round | Levanger | 2–4 | Ranheim | Levanger |
| 18:00 CEST (UTC+2) | López 18'; Nordberg (yellow card) 42'; Stene 60'; Duah (yellow card) 70' | Report | Karlsen 56', 67' (pen.); Reginiussen 74'; Sørløkk 76' (yellow card) 90+3' | Stadium: Moan Fritidspark; Attendance: 848; Referee: Mads Skarsem |

| 14 June 2018 Fourth Round | Strømsgodset | 2–0 | Ranheim | Drammen |
| 18:00 CEST (UTC+2) | Andersen 57'; Sætra (yellow card) 78'; Parr (yellow card) 89'; Jradi 90+2' | Report | | Stadium: Marienlyst Stadion; Attendance: 2,863; Referee: Trond Ivar Døvle |

== Squad statistics ==
As of match played 24 November 2018

=== Appearances and goals ===
| No. | Pos | Nat | Player | Total | | Eliteserien | | Norwegian Cup | |
| No. | Pos | Nat | Player | Apps | Goals | Apps | Goals | Apps | Goals |
|---|---|---|---|---|---|---|---|---|---|
| 1 | GK | (Norway) NOR | Even Barli | 32 | 0 | 30 | 0 | 2 | 0 |
| 3 | DF | (Norway) NOR | Daniel Kvande | 34 | 1 | 30 | 0 | 3+1 | 1 |
| 4 | DF | (Norway) NOR | Karl Morten Eek | 4 | 0 | 0+1 | 0 | 3 | 0 |
| 5 | DF | (Norway) NOR | Øyvind Alseth | 19 | 0 | 6+9 | 0 | 3+1 | 0 |
| 7 | MF | (Norway) NOR | Mads Reginiussen | 28 | 10 | 26 | 9 | 2 | 1 |
| 8 | MF | (Norway) NOR | Magnus Stamnestrø | 2 | 0 | 0+2 | 0 | 0 | 0 |
| 9 | FW | (Norway) NOR | Michael Karlsen | 25 | 11 | 17+5 | 8 | 3 | 3 |
| 10 | FW | (Norway) NOR | Øyvind Storflor | 24 | 3 | 13+10 | 3 | 1 | 0 |
| 11 | MF | (Norway) NOR | Eirik Valla Dønnem | 30 | 1 | 29 | 1 | 1 | 0 |
| 12 | GK | (Norway) NOR | Magnus Lenes | 2 | 0 | 0 | 0 | 2 | 0 |
| 13 | FW | (Norway) NOR | Joachim Olufsen | 8 | 0 | 3+4 | 0 | 0+1 | 0 |
| 14 | FW | (Norway) NOR | Mats Lillebo | 7 | 0 | 3+4 | 0 | 0 | 0 |
| 15 | MF | (Norway) NOR | Erik Tønne | 32 | 7 | 30 | 7 | 2 | 0 |
| 16 | MF | (Norway) NOR | Kristoffer Løkberg | 31 | 6 | 28 | 6 | 3 | 0 |
| 17 | MF | (Norway) NOR | Sondre Sørløkk | 21 | 1 | 5+12 | 0 | 2+2 | 1 |
| 18 | DF | (Norway) NOR | Ivar Furu | 19 | 0 | 11+8 | 0 | 0 | 0 |
| 20 | FW | (Norway) NOR | Kim Ove Riksvold | 10 | 1 | 5+1 | 1 | 1+3 | 0 |
| 21 | MF | (Norway) NOR | Jakob Tromsdal | 7 | 0 | 0+4 | 0 | 3 | 0 |
| 22 | MF | (Norway) NOR | Sivert Solli | 10 | 1 | 2+6 | 0 | 2 | 1 |
| 23 | DF | (Norway) NOR | Aslak Fonn Witry | 28 | 2 | 26 | 2 | 1+1 | 0 |
| 24 | DF | (Norway) NOR | Aleksander Foosnæs | 30 | 1 | 29 | 1 | 1 | 0 |
| 26 | FW | (Norway) NOR | Ola Solbakken | 13 | 0 | 6+5 | 0 | 2 | 0 |
| 27 | FW | (Norway) NOR | Andreas Helmersen | 25 | 4 | 11+12 | 3 | 1+1 | 1 |
Players away from Ranheim on loan:
| 19 | DF | (Norway) NOR | Glenn Walker | 3 | 0 | 0+1 | 0 | 2 | 0 |
Players who appeared for Ranheim no longer at the club:
| 2 | DF | (Norway) NOR | Christian Eggen Rismark | 20 | 1 | 18 | 1 | 2 | 0 |
| 8 | MF | (Norway) NOR | Simen Raaen Sandmæl | 8 | 1 | 2+4 | 1 | 2 | 0 |

=== Goal scorers ===
| Place | Position | Nation | Number | Name | Eliteserien | Norwegian Cup | Total |
|---|---|---|---|---|---|---|---|
| 1 | FW | (Norway) | 9 | Michael Karlsen | 8 | 3 | 11 |
| 2 | MF | (Norway) | 7 | Mads Reginiussen | 9 | 1 | 10 |
| 3 | MF | (Norway) | 15 | Erik Tønne | 7 | 0 | 7 |
| 4 | MF | (Norway) | 16 | Kristoffer Løkberg | 6 | 0 | 6 |
| 5 | FW | (Norway) | 27 | Andreas Helmersen | 3 | 1 | 4 |
| 6 | FW | (Norway) | 10 | Øyvind Storflor | 3 | 0 | 3 |
| 7 | DF | (Norway) | 23 | Aslak Fonn Witry | 2 | 0 | 2 |
| 8 | DF | (Norway) | 2 | Christian Eggen Rismark | 1 | 0 | 1 |
| 8 | DF | (Norway) | 24 | Aleksander Foosnæs | 1 | 0 | 1 |
| 8 | MF | (Norway) | 11 | Eirik Valla Dønnem | 1 | 0 | 1 |
| 8 | MF | (Norway) | 8 | Simen Raaen Sandmæl | 1 | 0 | 1 |
| 8 | FW | (Norway) | 20 | Kim Ove Riksvold | 1 | 0 | 1 |
| 8 | DF | (Norway) | 3 | Daniel Kvande | 0 | 1 | 1 |
| 8 | MF | (Norway) | 22 | Sivert Solli | 0 | 1 | 1 |
| 8 | MF | (Norway) | 17 | Sondre Sørløkk | 0 | 1 | 1 |
| | | | | TOTALS | 43 | 8 | 51 |

=== Clean sheets ===
| Place | Position | Nation | Number | Name | Eliteserien | Norwegian Cup | Total |
|---|---|---|---|---|---|---|---|
| 1 | GK | (Norway) | 1 | Even Barli | 4 | 0 | 4 |
| 2 | GK | (Norway) | 12 | Magnus Lenes | 0 | 1 | 1 |
| | | | | TOTALS | 4 | 1 | 5 |

=== Disciplinary record ===
| Number | Nation | Position | Name | Eliteserien | | Norwegian Cup | | Total | |
| Number | Nation | Position | Name | Booked | Sent off (straight red) | Booked | Sent off (straight red) | Booked | Sent off (straight red) |
| 1 | (Norway) | GK | Even Barli | 1 | 0 | 0 | 0 | 1 | 0 |
| 3 | (Norway) | DF | Daniel Kvande | 1 | 0 | 0 | 0 | 1 | 0 |
| 5 | (Norway) | DF | Øyvind Alseth | 2 | 0 | 0 | 0 | 2 | 0 |
| 7 | (Norway) | MF | Mads Reginiussen | 5 | 0 | 0 | 0 | 5 | 0 |
| 9 | (Norway) | FW | Michael Karlsen | 5 | 0 | 0 | 0 | 5 | 0 |
| 10 | (Norway) | FW | Øyvind Storflor | 1 | 0 | 0 | 0 | 1 | 0 |
| 11 | (Norway) | MF | Eirik Valla Dønnem | 3 | 0 | 0 | 0 | 3 | 0 |
| 15 | (Norway) | MF | Erik Tønne | 2 | 0 | 0 | 0 | 2 | 0 |
| 16 | (Norway) | MF | Kristoffer Løkberg | 5 | 0 | 0 | 0 | 5 | 0 |
| 17 | (Norway) | MF | Sondre Sørløkk | 1 | 0 | 1 | 0 | 2 | 0 |
| 18 | (Norway) | DF | Ivar Furu | 3 | 1 | 0 | 0 | 3 | 1 |
| 21 | (Norway) | MF | Jakob Tromsdal | 1 | 0 | 0 | 0 | 1 | 0 |
| 23 | (Norway) | DF | Aslak Fonn Witry | 3 | 0 | 0 | 0 | 3 | 0 |
| 24 | (Norway) | DF | Aleksander Foosnæs | 3 | 0 | 0 | 0 | 3 | 0 |
| 27 | (Norway) | FW | Andreas Helmersen | 1 | 0 | 0 | 0 | 1 | 0 |
Players away from Ranheim on loan:
Players who left Ranheim during the season:
| 2 | (Norway) | DF | Christian Eggen Rismark | 2 | 0 | 0 | 0 | 2 | 0 |
| 8 | (Norway) | MF | Simen Raaen Sandmæl | 1 | 0 | 0 | 0 | 1 | 0 |
| | | | TOTALS | 40 | 1 | 1 | 0 | 41 | 1 |
