= 2017 Eliteserien promotion/relegation play-offs =

Norwegian football league play-offs

The 2017 Eliteserien Promotion/Relagetion play-offs was the 44th time a spot in the Eliteserien was decided by play-off matches between top tier and second level clubs.

At the end of the 2017 season, Aalesund and Viking were relegated directly to 2018 OBOS-ligaen, and were replaced by Bodø/Glimt and Start who were directly promoted.

== Background ==
The play-offs between Eliteserien and OBOS-ligaen have been held every year since 1972 with exceptions in 1994 and 2011. They take place for the two divisions following the conclusion of the regular season and are contested by the fourteenth-placed club in Eliteserien and the four clubs finishing below the automatic promotion places in OBOS-ligaen. The fixtures are determined by final league position – the first to knockout-rounds begins with the four teams in the OBOS-ligaen: 3rd v 6th and 4th v 5th, and the winner then play each other to determine who meet the Eliteserien club in the final.

== Qualified teams ==
Five teams entered a play-off for the last Eliteserien spot for the 2018 season. These were:

- Sogndal (14th placed team in Eliteserien)
- Mjøndalen (third placed team in the OBOS-ligaen)
- Ranheim (fourth placed team in the OBOS-ligaen)
- Sandnes Ulf (fifth placed team in the OBOS-ligaen)
- Ullensaker/Kisa (sixth placed team in the OBOS-ligaen)

The four OBOS-ligaen teams first played a single game knockout tournament, with the winner (Ranheim) advancing to a two-legged tie against the Eliteserien team (Sogndal) for the 16th and final spot in the 2018 Eliteserien season. Ranheim won promotion to Eliteserien with a 1–1 on aggregate and a 5–4 win on penalties against Sogndal.

=== Matches ===
The third to sixth-placed teams took part in the promotion play-offs; these were single leg knockout matches, two semi-finals and a final. The winners, Ranheim, advanced to play the 14th placed team in Eliteserien over two legs in the Eliteserien play-offs for a spot in the top-flight next season.

==== First round ====
11 November 2017
15:00 CET (UTC+1)

Mjøndalen	3–1	Ull/Kisa
Gauseth 13' (pen.); Fredriksen 21'; Pellegrino 40'	Report	Aalbu 38'

Isachsen Stadion, Mjøndalen
Attendance: 1,723
Referee: Tommy Skjerven
12 November 2017
15:00 CET (UTC+1)

Ranheim	1–0	Sandnes Ulf
Lillebo 77'	Report

Extra Arena, Ranheim
Attendance: 585
Referee: Trygve Kjensli

==== Second round ====
19 November 2017
14:00 CET (UTC+1)

Mjøndalen	1–2	Ranheim
Pellegrino 61'	Report	Karlsen 16'; Reginiussen 80'

Isachsen Stadion, Mjøndalen
Attendance: 1,748
Referee: Sigurd Kringstad

==== Final ====
The 14th-placed team in Eliteserien, Sogndal, played a two-legged play-off against Ranheim, the winners of the OBOS-ligaen promotion play-offs, to decide who will play in the 2018 Eliteserien.

29 November 2017
18:00 CET (UTC+1)

Sogndal	1–0	Ranheim
Rindarøy 53'	Report

Fosshaugane Campus, Sogndalsfjøra
Attendance: 4,531
Referee: Tom Harald Hagen
2 December 2017
18:00 CET (UTC+1)

Ranheim	1–0 (a.e.t.)	Sogndal
Karlsen 88' (pen.)	Report
Penalties
Reginiussen (penalty scored); Kvande (penalty scored); Barli (penalty scored); Witry (penalty scored); Karlsen (penalty scored)	5–4	(penalty scored) Teniste; (penalty scored) Soltvedt; (penalty scored) Mandić; (penalty missed) Schulze; (penalty scored) Hovland

Extra Arena, Ranheim
Attendance: 1,343
Referee: Tore Hansen

1–1 on aggregate. Ranheim won 5–4 on penalties.

== Bracket ==
First round
3	Mjøndalen	3
6	Ullensaker/Kisa	1
4	Ranheim	1
5	Sandnes Ulf	0

Second round
3	Mjøndalen	1
4	Ranheim	2

Final round
14	Sogndal	1
4	Ranheim (pen.)	0
