= Christian Eggen Rismark =

Norwegian footballer (born 1991)

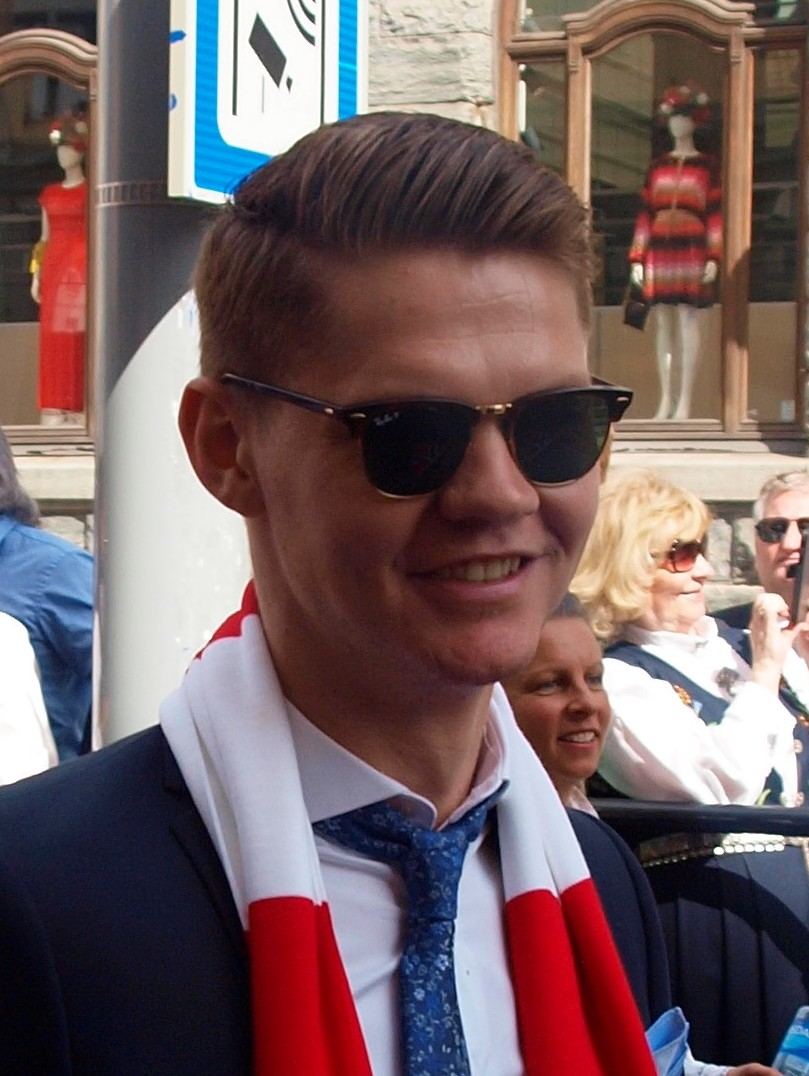
- Eggen Rismark in 2019

Personal information
- Full name: Christian Eggen Rismark
- Date of birth: 1 August 1991 (age 35)
- Place of birth: Trondheim, Norway
- Height: 1.93 m (6 ft 4 in)
- Position: Defender

Team information
- Current team: Ranheim (head coach)

Youth career
- –2008: Ranheim

Senior career*
Years	Team	Apps	(Gls)
2008	Ranheim		
2010–2011	Strindheim		
2012	Nardo	17	(1)
2013–2018	Ranheim	91	(4)
2015	→ Rødde (loan)	14	(3)
2015	→ Orkla (loan)	11	(2)
2018–2020	Brann	34	(2)
2020–2023	Ranheim	90	(10)
2024	KIL/Hemne	1	(0)
Total		258	(22)

Managerial career
- 2024: Ranheim (assistant)
- 2025–: Ranheim
- * Club domestic league appearances and goals

Christian Eggen Rismark (born 1 August 1991) is a Norwegian football coach, and former professional footballer, who currently is the head coach of Ranheim.

== Career ==
Eggen Rismark started his career at Ranheim as a junior, he then moved to Strindheim in 2010. After one season in Strindheim, he then moved to local club Nardo in 2012. He moved to Ranheim in 2013. In 2015 he moved on loan to Tillerbyen, he then moved to Orkla on loan for the rest of 2015 season. In August 2018 Eggen Rismark went to Brann on a three-year contract.

Eggen Rismark made his debut for Ranheim in a 1–0 win against KIL/Hemne in the Norwegian Cup.

After two full seasons at Brann, Eggen Rismark once again returned to his boyhood club Ranheim, this time on a three-and-a-half-year contract.

== Coaching career ==
After retiring from football at the end of the Ranheim's 2023 season, Rismark was quickly announced as the clubs new assistant coach, under Kåre Ingebrigtsen. When Ingebrigtsen announced that he would not remain on as head coach for the next season, Eggen Rismark was promoted from assistant to head coach. At the same time, Pål André Helland, who previously worked as a player developer, would join him as co-coach.

== Personal life ==
Eggen Rismark is the grandchild of former Rosenborg coach Nils Arne Eggen. He has a twin brother, Lars Eggen Rismark, a former professional handball player.

== Career statistics ==
As of match played 12 June 2024

Appearances and goals by club, season and competition
Club	Season	League			National Cup		Europe		Other		Total	
Club	Season	Division	Apps	Goals	Apps	Goals	Apps	Goals	Apps	Goals	Apps	Goals
Nardo	2012	2. divisjon	17	1	2	0	—		—		19	1
Ranheim	2013	1. divisjon	20	1	3	0	—		1 (Note: Appearances in Eliteserien play-offs)	0	24	1
Ranheim	2014	1. divisjon	10	0	1	0	—		—		11	0
Ranheim	2016	1. divisjon	14	0	2	0	—		—		16	0
Ranheim	2017	1. divisjon	29	2	3	0	—		4	0	36	2
Ranheim	2018	Eliteserien	18	1	2	0	—		—		20	1
Ranheim	Total		91	4	11	0	—		5	0	107	4
Rødde (loan)	2015	2. divisjon	14	3	2	0	—		—		16	3
Orkla (loan)	2015	3. divisjon	11	2	0	0	—		—		11	2
Brann	2018	Eliteserien	6	1	0	0	—		—		6	1
Brann	2019	Eliteserien	20	1	3	0	2 (Note: Appearances in UEFA Europa League)	0	–		25	1
Brann	2020	Eliteserien	8	0	—		—		—		8	0
Brann	Total		34	2	3	0	2	0	—		39	2
Ranheim	2020	1. divisjon	13	1	—		—		2	0	15	1
Ranheim	2021	1. divisjon	22	4	3	0	—		—		25	4
Ranheim	2022	1. divisjon	28	1	3	0	—		—		31	1
Ranheim	2023	1. divisjon	27	4	3	0	—		—		30	4
Ranheim	Total		90	10	9	0	—		2	0	101	10
KIL/Hemne	2024	4. divisjon	1	0	0	0	—		—		1	0
Career total			258	22	27	0	2	0	7	0	294	22

== Managerial statistics ==
As of match played 8 November 2026

Managerial record by team and tenure
Team	From	To	Record				
Team	From	To	P	W	D	L	Win %
Ranheim	1 January 2025	Present	68	30	11	27	44.1
Total			68	30	11	27	44.1
