= Joachim Olufsen =

Norwegian footballer (born 1995)

Personal information
- Full name: Joachim Erlend Olufsen
- Date of birth: 14 July 1995 (age 31)
- Place of birth: Mo i Rana, Norway
- Height: 1.80 m (5 ft 11 in)
- Position: Forward

Team information
- Current team: Vard
- Number: 9

Youth career
- –2011: Stålkameratene
- 2014–2015: Rosenborg

Senior career*
Years	Team	Apps	(Gls)
2012–2014	Stålkameratene	53	(11)
2015–2017	Strindheim	38	(11)
2016	→ Mo (loan)	13	(0)
2018–2019	Ranheim	7	(0)
2020–2022	Stjørdals-Blink	51	(1)
2022	Rana	7	(0)
2023–	Vard	23	(4)
- * Club domestic league appearances and goals as of 1 January 2025

Joachim Erlend Olufsen (born 14 July 1995) is a Norwegian footballer from Mo i Rana who plays for SK Vard Haugesund.

He started his career in IL Stålkameratene. When he was 16 years old he was recruited to the first team who played in 3. Division. in his first season he delivered most assist, won Rana Blad's player of the year and was named the best player of the season by his teammates. This resulted in a professional contract. When he was 18 years old he joined Rosenborg BK's youth system as the first "last year junior" ever to be signed. Not breaking through in the first team, Mini Jakobsen signed him to Strindheim. He then alternated between Strindheim IL and Mo. Strindheim IL was struggling to keep their place in the division and he came back to Trondheim to play the last half of the season for them. Strindheim IL did not manage to keep their place and was moved down to 4. Division. He instead joined Trondheim-based Eliteserie club Ranheim in 2018, where he played 7 matches in Norway's highest division the first season before getting injured.

== Career statistics ==
=== Club ===
As of match played 11 April 2022

Appearances and goals by club, season and competition
Club	Season	League			National Cup		Europe		Other		Total	
Club	Season	Division	Apps	Goals	Apps	Goals	Apps	Goals	Apps	Goals	Apps	Goals
Stålkameratene	2012	3. divisjon	22	6	0	0	-		-		22	6
Stålkameratene	2013	3. divisjon	21	4	2	1	-		-		23	5
Stålkameratene	2014	3. divisjon	10	1	2	1	-		-		12	2
Stålkameratene	Total		53	11	4	2	-	-	-	-	57	13
Strindheim	2015	2. divisjon	6	1	0	0	-		-		6	1
Strindheim	2016	2. divisjon	8	3	0	0	-		-		8	3
Strindheim	2017	3. divisjon	24	7	1	0	-		-		25	7
Strindheim	Total		38	11	1	0	-	-	-	-	39	11
Mo (loan)	2016	2. divisjon	13	0	2	0	-		-		15	0
Mo (loan)	Total		13	0	2	0	-	-	-	-	15	0
Ranheim	2018	Eliteserien	7	0	0	0	-		-		7	0
Ranheim	2019	Eliteserien	0	0	1	0	-		-		1	0
Ranheim	Total		7	0	1	0	-	-	-	-	8	0
Stjørdals-Blink	2020	1. divisjon	15	1	-		-		-		15	1
Stjørdals-Blink	2021	1. divisjon	22	0	0	0	-		-		22	0
Stjørdals-Blink	2022	1. divisjon	2	0	0	0	-		-		2	0
Stjørdals-Blink	Total		39	1	0	0	-	-	-	-	39	1
Career total			150	23	8	2	-	-	-	-	158	25
