= 2019 SK Brann season =

Brann
2019 season
- President: Eivind Lunde
- Manager: Lars Arne Nilsen
- Stadium: Brann Stadion
- Eliteserien: 9th
- Norwegian Cup: Fourth Round vs Ranheim
- UEFA Europa League: First qualifying vs Shamrock Rovers
- Top goalscorer: League: Daouda Bamba (7); All: Daouda Bamba (8)
Home colours	Away colours

The 2019 season is Brann's fourth season back in Eliteserien since their relegation at the end of the 2014 season.

== Squad ==
Note: Flags indicate national team as defined under FIFA eligibility rules; some limited exceptions apply. Players may hold more than one non-FIFA nationality.

No.	Pos.	Nation	Player
1	GK	NOR	Håkon Opdal
2	DF	EST	Taijo Teniste
3	DF	NED	Vito Wormgoor (Captain)
4	DF	NOR	Christian Eggen Rismark
5	DF	NOR	Thomas Grøgaard
6	DF	SWE	Jesper Löfgren
7	FW	GHA	Gilbert Koomson
8	MF	NOR	Fredrik Haugen
9	MF	NOR	Petter Strand
10	MF	BIH	Amer Ordagić
11	FW	CIV	Daouda Bamba

No.	Pos.	Nation	Player
12	GK	NOR	Eirik Johansen
14	FW	NED	Ludcinio Marengo
15	DF	CRC	Bismar Acosta
16	MF	NOR	Ruben Yttergård Jenssen
17	DF	FRO	Gilli Rólantsson
18	FW	NOR	Azar Karadas (Vice captain)
19	FW	NOR	Veton Berisha
21	DF	NOR	Ruben Kristiansen
24	GK	NOR	Emil Harloff
29	MF	NOR	Kristoffer Barmen

=== Out on loan ===
Note: Flags indicate national team as defined under FIFA eligibility rules; some limited exceptions apply. Players may hold more than one non-FIFA nationality.

No.	Pos.	Nation	Player
—	GK	NOR	Markus Olsen Pettersen) (at Nest-Sotra)
—	DF	NOR	Nicholas Marthinussen (at Sotra)
—	FW	NOR	Marius Bildøy (at Åsane)
—	FW	NOR	Marcus Mehnert (at Nest-Sotra)

== Transfers ==
=== In ===
Date	Position	Nationality	Name	From	Fee	Ref.
1 January 2019	GK	(Norway)	Håkon Opdal	Start	Free	
1 January 2019	DF	(Sweden)	Jesper Löfgren	Mjällby	Free	
1 January 2019	MF	(Norway)	Kristoffer Løkberg	Ranheim	Undisclosed	
1 January 2019	FW	(Norway)	Marcus Mehnert	Asker	Undisclosed	
9 January 2019	GK	(Norway)	Eirik Johansen	Sandefjord	Undisclosed	
14 January 2019	MF	(Norway)	Petter Strand	Molde	Undisclosed	
30 March 2019	FW	(Norway)	Veton Berisha	Rapid Wien	Undisclosed	

=== Out ===
Date	Position	Nationality	Name	To	Fee	Ref.
18 January 2019	DF	(Iceland)	Viðar Ari Jónsson	Sandefjord	Undisclosed	
21 January 2019	FW	(Norway)	Steffen Lie Skålevik	Sarpsborg 08	Undisclosed	
17 January 2019	MF	(Costa Rica)	Deyver Vega	Vålerenga	Undisclosed	
24 July 2019	FW	(Norway)	Henrik Kjelsrud Johansen	Fredrikstad	Undisclosed	
13 August 2019	MF	(Norway)	Kristoffer Løkberg	Viking	Undisclosed	

=== Loans out ===
Date from	Position	Nationality	Name	to	Date to	Ref.
14 January 2019	GK	(Norway)	Markus Olsen Pettersen	Nest-Sotra	End of Season	
26 February 2019	FW	(Norway)	Marcus Mehnert	Nest-Sotra	End of Season	
3 April 2019	FW	(Norway)	Marius Bildøy	Åsane	End of Season	
3 April 2019	DF	(Norway)	Nicholas Marthinussen	Sola	End of Season	

=== Released ===
Date	Position	Nationality	Name	Joined	Date
2 December 2019	FW	(Norway)	Azar Karadas	Retired	
31 December 2019	GK	(Norway)	Emil Harloff		
31 December 2019	MF	(Norway)	Halldor Stenevik	Strømsgodset	1 January 2019
31 December 2019	MF	(Norway)	Peter Orry Larsen	Aalesund	1 January 2019
31 December 2019	MF	(Norway)	Daniel Braaten	Stabæk	21 February 2019

== Competitions ==
=== Eliteserien ===
==== Results summary ====
Overall								Home						Away					
Pld	W	D	L	GF	GA	GD	Pts	W	D	L	GF	GA	GD	W	D	L	GF	GA	GD
30	10	10	10	32	37	−5	40	5	6	4	14	16	−2	5	4	6	18	21	−3

Last updated: 1 December 2019.
Source: Results

==== Results by round ====
Round	1	2	3	4	5	6	7	8	9	10	11	12	13	14	15	16	17	18	19	20	21	22	23	24	25	26	27	28	29	30
Ground	A	H	H	A	H	A	H	A	H	A	H	A	H	A	H	H	A	A	H	A	A	H	A	H	A	H	A	H	A	H
Result	L	D	W	L	D	W	L	W	W	W	L	D	W	D	D	W	W	L	L	W	L	D	D	D	D	D	L	W	L	L
Position	11	11	14	14	12	14	8	8	6	8	8	6	6	8	6	5	4	5	5	5	5	6	7	6	6	7	7	7	7	9

Updated to match(es) played on 24 November 2019. Source: Results
A = Away; H = Home; W = Win; D = Draw; L = Loss

==== Results ====
30 March 2019 1	Odd	3–2	Brann	Skien
15:30 CEST (UTC+2)	Hoff 45'; Børven 47', 68'	Report	Wormgoor 1', 76' (pen.); Teniste (yellow card) 54'; Karadas (yellow card) 90+5'	Stadium: Skagerak Arena; Attendance: 7,295; Referee: Espen Eskås

7 April 2019 2	Brann	1–1	Strømsgodset	Bergen
20:00 CEST (UTC+2)	Acosta (yellow card) 4'; Strand 53'	Report	Stengel (yellow card) 8'; Pellegrino 40'; Glesnes (yellow card) 49'; Pedersen (yellow card) 77'; Vilkvik (yellow card) 90+4'	Stadium: Brann Stadion; Attendance: 13,213; Referee: Trond Ivar Døvle

10 April 2019 15	Brann	2–1	Kristiansund	Bergen
18:30 CEST (UTC+2)	Bamba 3'; Rismark 61'	Report	Sørli 76'; Cirak (yellow card) 90+3'	Stadium: Brann Stadion; Attendance: 9,103; Referee: Svein Oddvar Moen

13 April 2019 3	Viking	2–1	Brann	Stavanger
20:00 CEST (UTC+2)	Høiland (yellow card) 16'; Thorstvedt 64' (yellow card) 74'; Sale (yellow card) 70' (yellow-red card) 90+1'; Ibrahimaj 79'; Tripić (yellow card) 86'	Report	Berisha (yellow card) 9'; Acosta (yellow card) 39'; Haugen 85'; Karadas (yellow card) 86'; Stand (yellow card) 90+7'	Stadium: Viking Stadion; Attendance: 13,029; Referee: Ola Nilsen

22 April 2019 4	Brann	1–1	Vålerenga	Bergen
20:00 CEST (UTC+2)	Barmen 22'; Berisha (yellow card) 37'	Report	Shala 38'; Tollås (yellow card) 90+4'	Stadium: Brann Stadion; Attendance: 10,889; Referee: Tore Hansen

28 April 2019 5	Tromsø	1–2	Brann	Tromsø
18:00 CEST (UTC+2)	Pirinen (yellow card) 31'; Espejord 66'	Report	Løkberg 52'; Wormgoor 71' (pen.)	Stadium: Alfheim Stadion; Attendance: 3,137; Referee: Tommy Skjerven

5 May 2019 6	Brann	0–1	Ranheim	Bergen
18:00 CEST (UTC+2)	Acosta (yellow card) 90+2'	Report	Reginiussen 56'; Dønnem (yellow card) 58'; Solbakken (yellow card) 61'	Stadium: Brann Stadion; Attendance: 10,026; Referee: Trygve Kjensli

12 May 2019 7	Stabæk	0–1	Brann	Bærum
20:00 CEST (UTC+2)	Strømnes (yellow card) 72'	Report	Berisha 21'; Ordagić (yellow card) 60'; Løkberg (yellow card) 79'; Jenssen (yellow card) 90+3'	Stadium: Nadderud Stadion; Attendance: 3,942; Referee: Tom Harald Hagen

16 May 2019 8	Brann	2–1	Sarpsborg 08	Bergen
18:00 CEST (UTC+2)	Berisha 32'; Strand 40'	Report	Askar (yellow card) 25'; Zachariassen (yellow card) 29'; Bateau 58'	Stadium: Brann Stadion; Attendance: 16,484; Referee: Svein Oddvar Moen

19 May 2019 9	Bodø/Glimt	1–2	Brann	Bodø
20:00 CEST (UTC+2)	Bjørkan 43'	Report	Bamba 28'; Acosta 31'; Jenssen (yellow card) 62'	Stadium: Aspmyra Stadion; Attendance: 3,721; Referee: Dag Vidar Hafsås

26 May 2019 10	Brann	0–1	Rosenborg	Bergen
20:00 CEST (UTC+2)		Report	Hedenstad (yellow card) 11'; David 88'	Stadium: Brann Stadion; Attendance: 14,956; Referee: Tore Hansen

15 June 2019 11	Haugesund	1–1	Brann	Haugesund
18:99 CEST (UTC+2)	Leite (yellow card) 51'; Tronstad 62'; Samuelsen (yellow card) 80'	Report	Wormgoor (penalty missed) 37' 37'; Teniste (yellow card) 43'	Stadium: Haugesund Stadion; Attendance: 7,001; Referee: Tom Harald Hagen

23 June 2019 12	Brann	1–0	Lillestrøm	Bergen
20:00 CEST (UTC+2)	Koomson 73'	Report	Pedersen (yellow card) 51'	Stadium: Brann Stadion; Attendance: 9,523; Referee: Rohit Saggi

30 June 2019 13	Molde	1–1	Brann	Molde
20:00 CEST (UTC+2)	Knudtzon (yellow card) 31'; Aursnes (penalty missed) 58'; James 84' (pen.)	Report	Jenssen 61'	Stadium: Aker Stadion; Attendance: 6,900; Referee: Svein Oddvar Moen

5 July 2019 14	Brann	0–0	Mjøndalen	Bergen
19:00 CEST (UTC+2)		Report	Jansen (yellow card) 52'; Aasmundsen (yellow card) 82'; Liseth (yellow card) 90'	Stadium: Brann Stadion; Attendance: 10,039; Referee: Tom Harald Hagen

21 July 2019 17	Brann	2–1	Stabæk	Bergen
18:00 CEST (UTC+2)	Jenssen 59'; Berisha 67'	Report	Braaten 81'	Stadium: Brann Stadion; Attendance: 9,049; Referee: Tom Harald Hagen

4 August 2019 16	Ranheim	0–3	Brann	Trondheim
18:00 CEST (UTC+2)	Solbakken (yellow card) 63'; Alseth (yellow card) 73'	Report	Bamba 19'; Wormgoor 45+3'; Koomson 90+1'	Stadium: EXTRA Arena; Attendance: 2,145; Referee: Sigurd Kringstad

18 August 2019 18	Mjøndalen	2–1	Brann	Mjøndalen
18:00 CEST (UTC+2)	Aasmundsen 8' (yellow card) 44'; Jansen (yellow card) 16'; Brochmann (yellow card) 46'; Dragsnes 59'	Report	Bamba 19'; Berisha (yellow card) 83'; Wormgoor (yellow card) 90+2'	Stadium: Consto Arena; Attendance: 2,614; Referee: Trond Ivar Døvle

25 August 2019 19	Brann	2–3	Tromsø	Bergen
18:00 CEST (UTC+2)	Bamba 22'; Jenssen (yellow card) 39'; Berisha (yellow card) 74'; Karadas 89'	Report	Kongshavn (yellow card) 11'; Wormgoor 40' (o.g.); Valakari 56'; Sokol (yellow card) 74'; Azemi 76'	Stadium: Brann Stadion; Attendance: 10,314; Referee: Tommy Skjerven

1 September 2019 20	Lillestrøm	1–3	Brann	Lillestrøm
18:00 CEST (UTC+2)	Rafn 22'; Marić (yellow card) 42'; Olsen (yellow card) 53'; Mikalsen (yellow card) 74'; Smárason (yellow card) 87'	Report	Strand 13'; Jenssen 34'; Rólantsson 50'; Kristiansen (yellow card) 88'; Wormgoor (yellow card) 90+4'	Stadium: Åråsen Stadion; Attendance: 6,771; Referee: Svein Oddvar Moen

15 September 2019 21	Kristiansund	1–0	Brann	Kristiansund
20:00 CEST (UTC+2)	Pellegrino 13'; Aasbak (yellow card) 73'	Report	Wormgoor (yellow card) 65'	Stadium: Kristiansund Stadion; Attendance: 4,007; Referee: Dag Vidar Hafsås

21 September 2019 22	Brann	0–0	Haugesund	Bergen
18:00 CEST (UTC+2)	Jenssen (yellow card) 9'; Heggebø (yellow card) 47'	Report	Desler (yellow card) 74'	Stadium: Brann Stadion; Attendance: 10,129; Referee: Rohit Saggi

28 September 2019 23	Rosenborg	0–0	Brann	Trondheim
20:00 CEST (UTC+2)	Meling (yellow card) 70'	Report	Teniste (yellow card) 32'; Kristiansen (yellow card) 71'	Stadium: Lerkendal Stadion; Attendance: 12,578; Referee: Svein Oddvar Moen

6 October 2019 24	Brann	0–0	Molde	Bergen
20:00 CEST (UTC+2)		Report		Stadium: Brann Stadion; Attendance: 9,821; Referee: Espen Eskås

20 October 2019 25	Sarpsborg 08	1–1	Brann	Sarpsborg
20:00 CEST (UTC+2)	Lafferty (yellow card) 88' (goal) 89'	Report	Teniste 14'; Acosta (yellow card) 88'	Stadium: Sarpsborg Stadion; Attendance: 4,947; Referee: Dag Vidar Hafsås

28 October 2019 26	Brann	1–1	Bodø/Glimt	Bergen
19:00 CET (UTC+1)	Bamba 53'; Haugen (yellow card) 64'	Report	Saltnes 9'; Berg (yellow card) 47'	Stadium: Brann Stadion; Attendance: 8,875; Referee: Rohit Saggi

3 November 2019 27	Vålerenga	1–0	Brann	Oslo
20:00 CEST (UTC+2)	Shala 45+4'; Lekven (yellow card) 90+5'	Report	Jenssen (yellow card) 8'; Barmen (yellow card) 29'; Acosta (yellow card) 67'; Koomson (yellow card) 90+5'	Stadium: Intility Arena; Attendance: 5,889; Referee: Tore Hansen

8 November 2019 28	Brann	1–0	Odd	Bergen
19:00 CEST (UTC+2)	Haugen (yellow card) 59'; Wormgoor (yellow card) 64'; Bamba 74'; Barmen (yellow card) 84'	Report		Stadium: Brann Stadion; Attendance: 8,693; Referee: Tommy Skjerven

24 November 2019 29	Strømsgodset	6–0	Brann	Drammen
18:00 CEST (UTC+2)	Mawa 21'; Salvesen 37', 43'; Tchamba 39'; Tokstad 48'; Stengel 66'; Fofana (yellow card) 87'	Report		Stadium: Marienlyst Stadion; Attendance: 5,352; Referee: Svein Oddvar Moen

1 December 2019 30	Brann	1–5	Viking	Bergen
18:00 CEST (UTC+2)	Haugen 8' (yellow card) 80'; Wormgoor (yellow card) 21'; Kristiansen (yellow card) 31'	Report	Thorstvedt 16', 72'; Furdal 39'; Ibrahimaj 66'; Friðjónsson 90+3'	Stadium: Brann Stadion; Attendance: 14,490; Referee: Dag Vidar Hafsås

==== Table ====
Pos	Team	Pld	W	D	L	GF	GA	GD	Pts
7	Haugesund	30	9	13	8	44	37	+7	40
8	Stabæk	30	10	10	10	38	36	+2	40
9	Brann	30	10	10	10	32	37	−5	40
10	Vålerenga	30	8	10	12	39	44	−5	34
11	Strømsgodset	30	8	8	14	41	54	−13	32

Source: Football Association of Norway (in Norwegian), Soccerway
Rules for classification: 1) Points; 2) Goal difference; 3) Goals scored; 4) Head-to-head points; 5) Head-to-head goal difference; 6) Head-to-head away goals scored (only if between two teams); 7) Head-to-head goals scored; 8) Play-off (only used to decide champions or relegation).

=== Norwegian Cup ===
1 May 2019 First Round	Arna-Bjørnar	1–6	Brann	Bergen
18:30 CEST (UTC+2)	Mjelde Tysse 25'; M.Boge (yellow card) 66'	Report	Grøgaard 21'; Kjelsrud Johansen 31' (pen.), 55'; Karadas 57'; Mjøs 66' (pen.), 80'	Stadium: Arna Idrettspark; Attendance: 2,382; Referee: André Knudsen Arnholt

23 May 2019 Second Round	Åsane	0–2	Brann	Åsane
18:00 CEST (UTC+2)	V.Birkeland (yellow card) 38'	Report	Rólantsson (yellow card) 47'; Kjelsrud Johansen 57'; Strand 74'	Stadium: Åsane Idrettspark; Attendance: 600; Referee: Marius Hansen Grøtta

19 June 2019 Third Round	Sogndal	1–2	Brann	Sogndalsfjøra
18:00 CEST (UTC+2)	Haugen 27' (yellow card) 49'	Report	Johansen (yellow card) 26'; Antonijevic 41' (o.g.); Ordagic 42'; Grøgaard (yellow card) 47'	Stadium: Fosshaugane Campus; Attendance: 2,564; Referee: Espen Eskås

26 June 2019 Fourth Round	Ranheim	4–0	Brann	Trondheim
18:00 CEST (UTC+2)	Blakstad 12', 65'; Karlsen (yellow card) 25'; Reginiussen 50'; Solbakken 59'	Report	Teniste (yellow card) 69'	Stadium: EXTRA Arena; Attendance: 1,250; Referee: Trygve Kjensli

=== Europa League ===
==== Qualifying rounds ====
11 July 2019 First qualifying round 1st leg	Brann (Norway)	2–2	(Republic of Ireland) Shamrock Rovers	Bergen, Norway
19:00 CEST (UTC+2)	Teniste 12'; Berisha 36' (pen.) (yellow card) 90+3'	Report	Ordagić 34' (o.g.); Finn (yellow card) 49'; E.Boyle (yellow card) 90+3'; Lopes 90+4'	Stadium: Brann Stadion; Attendance: 4,560; Referee: Juxhin Xhaja (Albania)

18 July 2019 First qualifying round 2nd leg	Shamrock Rovers (Republic of Ireland)	2–1 (4–3 agg.)	(Norway) Brann	Dublin, Republic of Ireland
21:00 CEST (UTC+2)	Byrne 76'; E.Boyle (yellow card) 84'; O'Neill 87'; L.Grace (yellow card) 90+1'	Report	Bamba 57'	Stadium: Tallaght Stadium; Attendance: 5,135; Referee: Kári Jóannesarson Á Høvdanum (Faroe Islands)

== Squad statistics ==
As of match played 1 December 2019

=== Appearances and goals ===
No.	Pos	Nat	Player	Total		Eliteserien		Norwegian Cup		Europa League	
No.	Pos	Nat	Player	Apps	Goals	Apps	Goals	Apps	Goals	Apps	Goals
1	GK	(Norway) NOR	Håkon Opdal	30	0	27	0	1	0	2	0
2	DF	(Estonia) EST	Taijo Teniste	30	2	26	1	1+1	0	2	1
3	DF	(Netherlands) NED	Vito Wormgoor	30	5	28	5	2	0	0	0
4	DF	(Norway) NOR	Christian Eggen Rismark	25	1	14+6	1	3	0	2	0
5	DF	(Norway) NOR	Thomas Grøgaard	17	1	7+6	0	4	1	0	0
7	FW	(Ghana) GHA	Gilbert Koomson	29	2	20+5	2	2	0	2	0
8	MF	(Norway) NOR	Fredrik Haugen	17	2	9+5	2	0+1	0	2	0
9	MF	(Norway) NOR	Petter Strand	26	4	19+2	3	3	1	1+1	0
10	MF	(Bosnia and Herzegovina) BIH	Amer Ordagić	18	1	13+1	0	2	1	2	0
11	FW	(Ivory Coast) CIV	Daouda Bamba	25	8	17+4	7	0+2	0	0+2	1
12	GK	(Norway) NOR	Eirik Johansen	6	0	3	0	3	0	0	0
14	FW	(Netherlands) NED	Ludcinio Marengo	2	0	0	0	2	0	0	0
15	DF	(Costa Rica) CRC	Bismar Acosta	33	1	28	1	2+1	0	2	0
16	MF	(Norway) NOR	Ruben Yttergård Jenssen	32	3	24+2	3	4	0	0+2	0
17	DF	(Faroe Islands) FRO	Gilli Rólantsson	30	1	13+11	1	3+1	0	2	0
18	FW	(Norway) NOR	Azar Karadas	16	2	1+12	1	1+1	1	0+1	0
19	FW	(Norway) NOR	Veton Berisha	31	4	26	3	2+1	0	2	1
21	DF	(Norway) NOR	Ruben Kristiansen	30	0	27+1	0	0	0	2	0
29	MF	(Norway) NOR	Kristoffer Barmen	28	1	21+4	1	1+2	0	0	0
31	DF	(Norway) NOR	Nicholas Marthinussen	1	0	0+1	0	0	0	0	0
32	DF	(Norway) NOR	Emil Kalsaas	2	0	0+1	0	1	0	0	0
33	MF	(Norway) NOR	Sander Marthinussen	3	0	0+3	0	0	0	0	0
37	MF	(Norway) NOR	Andreas Mjøs	2	2	0+1	0	0+1	2	0	0
39	FW	(Norway) NOR	Aune Heggebø	5	0	1+4	0	0	0	0	0
41	FW	(Norway) NOR	Mikal Kvinge	2	0	0+2	0	0	0	0	0
Players away from Brann on loan:
6	DF	(Sweden) SWE	Jesper Löfgren	3	0	0+1	0	2	0	0	0
Players who left Brann during the season:
23	MF	(Norway) NOR	Kristoffer Løkberg	16	1	5+6	1	3+1	0	1	0
27	FW	(Norway) NOR	Henrik Kjelsrud Johansen	7	3	1+4	0	2	3	0	0

=== Goal scorers ===
Place	Position	Nation	Number	Name	Eliteserien	Norwegian Cup	Europa League	Total
1	FW	(Ivory Coast)	11	Daouda Bamba	7	0	1	8
2	DF	(Netherlands)	3	Vito Wormgoor	5	0	0	5
3	MF	(Norway)	9	Petter Strand	3	1	0	4
3	FW	(Norway)	19	Veton Berisha	3	0	1	4
5	MF	(Norway)	16	Ruben Yttergård Jenssen	3	0	0	3
5	FW	(Norway)	27	Henrik Kjelsrud Johansen	0	3	0	3
7	FW	(Ghana)	7	Gilbert Koomson	2	0	0	2
7	MF	(Norway)	8	Fredrik Haugen	2	0	0	2
7	DF	(Norway)	18	Azar Karadas	1	1	0	2
7	MF	(Norway)	37	Andreas Mjøs	0	2	0	2
11	DF	(Norway)	4	Christian Eggen Rismark	1	0	0	1
11	DF	(Costa Rica)	15	Bismar Acosta	1	0	0	1
11	MF	(Norway)	23	Kristoffer Løkberg	1	0	0	1
11	MF	(Norway)	29	Kristoffer Barmen	1	0	0	1
11	DF	(Faroe Islands)	17	Gilli Rólantsson	1	0	0	1
11	DF	(Estonia)	2	Taijo Teniste	1	0	0	1
11	DF	(Norway)	5	Thomas Grøgaard	0	1	0	1
11	MF	(Bosnia and Herzegovina)	10	Amer Ordagić	0	1	0	1
11	DF	(Estonia)	2	Taijo Teniste	0	0	1	1
11				Own goal	0	1	0	1
				TOTALS	32	10	3	45

=== Disciplinary record ===
Number	Nation	Position	Name	Eliteserien		Norwegian Cup		Europa League		Total	
Number	Nation	Position	Name	Yellow card	Red card	Yellow card	Red card	Yellow card	Red card	Yellow card	Red card
2	(Estonia)	DF	Taijo Teniste	3	0	1	0	0	0	4	0
3	(Netherlands)	DF	Vito Wormgoor	5	0	0	0	0	0	5	0
5	(Norway)	DF	Thomas Grøgaard	0	0	1	0	0	0	1	0
7	(Ghana)	FW	Gilbert Koomson	1	0	0	0	0	0	1	0
8	(Norway)	MF	Fredrik Haugen	4	0	0	0	0	0	4	0
9	(Norway)	MF	Petter Strand	1	0	0	0	0	0	1	0
10	(Bosnia and Herzegovina)	MF	Amer Ordagić	1	0	0	0	0	0	1	0
12	(Norway)	GK	Eirik Johansen	0	0	1	0	0	0	1	0
15	(Costa Rica)	DF	Bismar Acosta	5	0	0	0	0	0	5	0
16	(Norway)	MF	Ruben Yttergård Jenssen	5	0	0	0	0	0	5	0
17	(Faroe Islands)	DF	Gilli Rólantsson	0	0	1	0	0	0	1	0
18	(Norway)	FW	Azar Karadas	2	0	0	0	0	0	2	0
19	(Norway)	FW	Veton Berisha	4	0	0	0	1	0	5	0
21	(Norway)	DF	Ruben Kristiansen	3	0	0	0	0	0	3	0
29	(Norway)	MF	Kristoffer Barmen	2	0	0	0	0	0	2	0
39	(Norway)	FW	Aune Heggebø	1	0	0	0	0	0	1	0
Players who left Brann during the season:
23	(Norway)	MF	Kristoffer Løkberg	1	0	0	0	0	0	1	0
			TOTALS	38	0	4	0	1	0	43	0
