= Kristoffer Løkberg =

Norwegian footballer (born 1992)

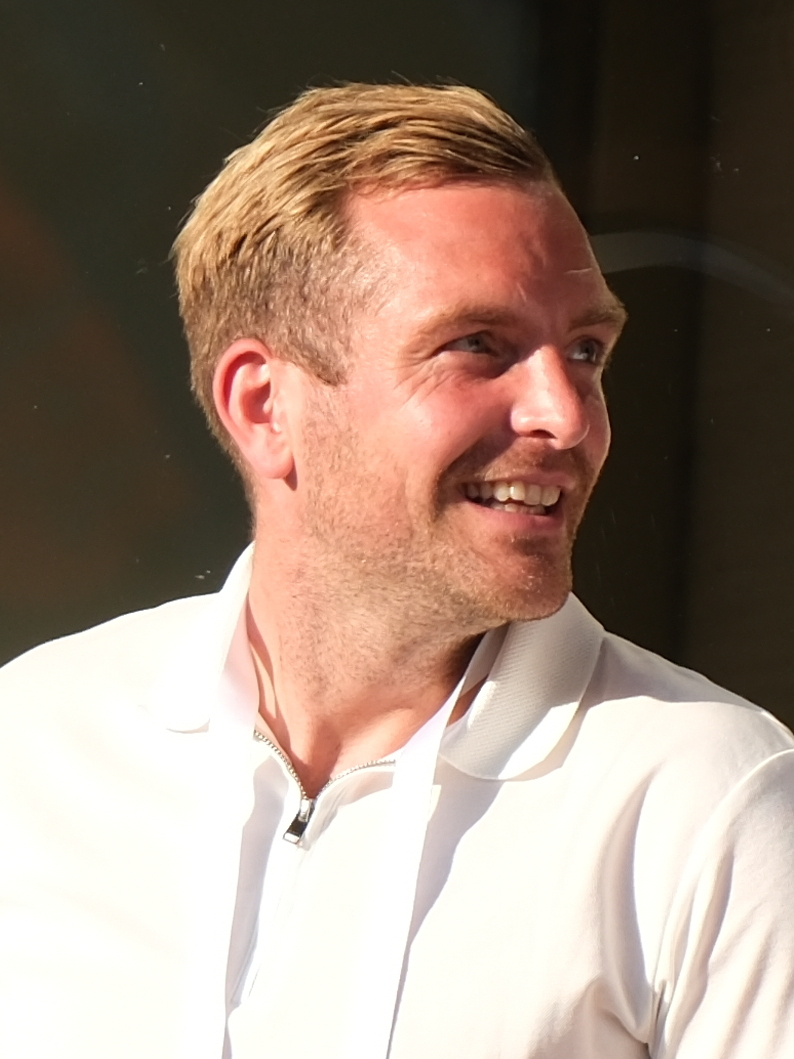
- Løkberg in 2025

Personal information
- Full name: Kristoffer Lie Løkberg
- Date of birth: 22 January 1992 (age 34)
- Place of birth: Trondheim, Norway
- Height: 1.74 m (5 ft 8 1/2 in)
- Position: Midfielder

Youth career
- Strindheim
- 2011: Sheffield United

Senior career*
| Years | Team | Apps | (Gls) |
| –2010 | Strindheim | | |
| 2011 | → Ranheim (loan) | 7 | (0) |
| 2012–2018 | Ranheim | 164 | (10) |
| 2019 | Brann | 11 | (1) |
| 2019–2024 | Viking | 93 | (11) |
| Total | | 275 | (22) |

International career
| 2008 | Norway U16 | 4 | (0) |
| 2009 | Norway U17 | 3 | (0) |
| 2010 | Norway U18 | 7 | (0) |
- * Club domestic league appearances and goals

Kristoffer Lie Løkberg (born 22 January 1992) is a Norwegian former professional footballer who played as a midfielder. He played for Ranheim, Brann and Viking in the Eliteserien.

== Career ==
In January 2011, he joined the Sheffield United Academy, where he stayed until July 2011, after which he moved to Ranheim. In January 2019, he joined Brann on a three-year contract.

In August 2019, Løkberg transferred to Viking, signing a contract until the end of the 2021 season. In May 2021, his contract was extended for two more years. He retired after the 2024 season.

== Career statistics ==
Appearances and goals by club, season and competition
| Club | Season | League | | | National Cup | | Other | | Total | |
| Club | Season | Division | Apps | Goals | Apps | Goals | Apps | Goals | Apps | Goals |
|---|---|---|---|---|---|---|---|---|---|---|
| Ranheim (loan) | 2011 | 1. divisjon | 7 | 0 | 0 | 0 | – | | 7 | 0 |
| Ranheim | 2012 | 1. divisjon | 26 | 1 | 1 | 0 | – | | 27 | 1 |
| Ranheim | 2013 | 1. divisjon | 27 | 0 | 3 | 0 | 4 (Note: Appearances in Eliteserien play-offs) | 1 | 34 | 1 |
| Ranheim | 2014 | 1. divisjon | 23 | 1 | 2 | 1 | – | | 25 | 2 |
| Ranheim | 2015 | 1. divisjon | 25 | 0 | 1 | 0 | 1 | 0 | 27 | 0 |
| Ranheim | 2016 | 1. divisjon | 10 | 0 | 0 | 0 | – | | 10 | 0 |
| Ranheim | 2017 | 1. divisjon | 25 | 2 | 1 | 0 | 4 | 0 | 30 | 2 |
| Ranheim | 2018 | Eliteserien | 28 | 6 | 3 | 0 | – | | 31 | 6 |
| Ranheim | Total | | 171 | 10 | 11 | 1 | 9 | 1 | 191 | 12 |
| Brann | 2019 | Eliteserien | 11 | 1 | 4 | 0 | 1 (Note: Appearance in UEFA Europa League) | 0 | 16 | 1 |
| Viking | 2019 | Eliteserien | 12 | 0 | 3 | 0 | – | | 15 | 0 |
| Viking | 2020 | Eliteserien | 24 | 2 | – | | 0 | 0 | 24 | 2 |
| Viking | 2021 | Eliteserien | 21 | 3 | 6 | 1 | – | | 27 | 4 |
| Viking | 2022 | Eliteserien | 22 | 4 | 4 | 0 | 5 (Note: Appearances in UEFA Europa Conference League) | 0 | 31 | 4 |
| Viking | 2023 | Eliteserien | 9 | 1 | 3 | 0 | – | | 12 | 1 |
| Viking | 2024 | Eliteserien | 5 | 1 | 1 | 1 | – | | 6 | 2 |
| Viking | Total | | 93 | 11 | 17 | 2 | 5 | 0 | 115 | 13 |
| Career total | | | 275 | 22 | 32 | 3 | 15 | 1 | 322 | 26 |

== Honours ==
Viking

- Norwegian Football Cup: 2019
