= Aleksander Foosnæs =

Norwegian footballer (born 1994)

Personal information
- Full name: Aleksander Foosnæs
- Date of birth: 5 June 1994 (age 32)
- Place of birth: Malvik Municipality, Norway
- Height: 1.72 m (5 ft 7 1/2 in)
- Position: Defender

Youth career
- 2012: Ranheim
- 2012–2013: Rosenborg

Senior career*
Years	Team	Apps	(Gls)
2012	Ranheim	2	(0)
2013	Rosenborg	0	(0)
2014–2020	Ranheim	119	(3)
2020–2021	Bodø/Glimt	8	(0)
2021–2022	Stjørdals-Blink	41	(2)
- * Club domestic league appearances and goals as of 3 November 2022

Aleksander Foosnæs (born 5 June 1994) is a former Norwegian footballer.

== Career ==
Foosnæs started his career at Ranheim as a junior and then moved to Rosenborg. Foosnæs went back to Ranheim in 2014.

Foosnæs made his debut for Ranheim in Eliteserien in a 4-1 win against Stabæk. On 8 January 2020, Foosnæs signed a two-year contract with Bodø/Glimt.

== Career statistics ==
=== Club ===
As of match played 10 July 2022

Appearances and goals by club, season and competition
Club	Season	League			National Cup		Continental		Total	
Club	Season	Division	Apps	Goals	Apps	Goals	Apps	Goals	Apps	Goals
Ranheim	2012	Adeccoligaen	2	0	0	0	-		2	0
Ranheim	Total		2	0	0	0	-	-	2	0
Rosenborg	2013	Tippeligaen	0	0	0	0	-		0	0
Rosenborg	Total		0	0	0	0	-	-	0	0
Ranheim	2014	1. divisjon	3	0	1	0	-		4	0
Ranheim	2015	OBOS-ligaen	5	0	1	0	-		6	0
Ranheim	2016	OBOS-ligaen	28	0	0	0	-		28	0
Ranheim	2017	OBOS-ligaen	25	1	3	0	-		28	1
Ranheim	2018	Eliteserien	29	1	1	0	-		30	1
Ranheim	2019	Eliteserien	29	1	4	0	-		33	1
Ranheim	Total		119	3	10	0	-	-	129	3
Bodø/Glimt	2020	Eliteserien	8	0	0	0	1	0	9	0
Bodø/Glimt	Total		8	0	0	0	1	0	9	0
Stjørdals-Blink	2021	OBOS-ligaen	27	2	2	0	-		29	2
Stjørdals-Blink	2022	OBOS-ligaen	14	0	0	0	-		14	0
Stjørdals-Blink	Total		41	2	2	0	-	-	43	2
Career total			170	5	12	0	1	0	183	5

== Honours ==
=== Club ===
Bodø/Glimt

- Eliteserien (1): 2020
