= Eirik Valla Dønnem =

Norwegian footballer (born 1990)

Personal information
- Full name: Eirik Valla Dønnem
- Date of birth: 22 July 1990 (age 36)
- Place of birth: Trondheim, Norway
- Position: Midfielder

Youth career
- –2006: Flatås
- 2007–2008: Rosenborg

Senior career*
| Years | Team | Apps | (Gls) |
| 2010–2012 | Byåsen | 28 | (2) |
| 2013 | Tiller | 21 | (2) |
| 2014–2015 | Tillerbyen | 24 | (4) |
| 2015–2017 | Byåsen | 53 | (1) |
| 2018–2020 | Ranheim | 82 | (3) |

International career^{‡}
| 2013– | Norway futsal | 34 | (5) |
- * Club domestic league appearances and goals as of 14 December 2020 ‡ National team caps and goals as of 14 April 2025

Eirik Valla Dønnem (born 21 July 1990) is a Norwegian futsal player and former footballer.

== Career ==
Valla Dønnem played for Rosenborg as a junior, he then moved to Byåsen in 2010. After three seasons in Byåsen, Valla Dønnem moved to local club Tiller in 2013. In 2014 the club was renamed Tillerbyen following a merger.

He moved back to his former club Byåsen in August 2015, staying in the club until he moved to first-tier side Ranheim before the 2018 season. Valla Dønnem made his debut in Eliteserien for Ranheim in a 4-1 win against Stabæk.

He retired after the 2020 season. However, he continued playing futsal for SK Freidig; from 2024 Utleira IL. After a long hiatus from the national team, he was selected for the Norwegian national team for the Nordic Baltic Cup of 2023.

== Career statistics ==
As of 14 December 2020

| Season | Club | Division | League | | Cup | | Total | |
| Season | Club | Division | Apps | Goals | Apps | Goals | Apps | Goals |
|---|---|---|---|---|---|---|---|---|
| 2010 | Byåsen | 2. divisjon | 4 | 0 | 0 | 0 | 4 | 0 |
| 2012 | Byåsen | 2. divisjon | 24 | 2 | 2 | 0 | 26 | 2 |
| 2013 | Tiller | 3. divisjon | 21 | 2 | 4 | 0 | 25 | 2 |
| 2014 | Tillerbyen | 2. divisjon | 13 | 4 | 1 | 0 | 14 | 4 |
| 2015 | Tillerbyen | 2. divisjon | 11 | 0 | 1 | 0 | 12 | 0 |
| 2015 | Byåsen | 2. divisjon | 10 | 0 | 0 | 0 | 10 | 0 |
| 2016 | Byåsen | 2. divisjon | 23 | 0 | 2 | 0 | 25 | 0 |
| 2017 | Byåsen | 2. divisjon | 20 | 1 | 1 | 0 | 21 | 1 |
| 2018 | Ranheim | Eliteserien | 29 | 1 | 1 | 0 | 30 | 1 |
| 2019 | Ranheim | Eliteserien | 29 | 2 | 6 | 0 | 35 | 2 |
| 2020 | Ranheim | 1. divisjon | 24 | 1 | – | | 24 | 1 |
| Career Total | | | 208 | 13 | 18 | 0 | 226 | 13 |
