= Reginiussen =

Reginiussen is a Norwegian surname. Notable people with the surname include:

- Mads Reginiussen (born 1988), Norwegian footballer, brother of Tore
- Tore Reginiussen (born 1986), Norwegian footballer
