= Simen Raaen Sandmæl =

Norwegian footballer (born 1990)

Simen Sandmæl
Personal information
- Full name: Simen Raaen Sandmæl
- Date of birth: 4 August 1990 (age 36)
- Place of birth: Meråker Municipality, Norway
- Height: 1.80 m (5 ft 11 in)
- Position: Midfielder

Youth career
- –2008: Remyra

Senior career*
Years	Team	Apps	(Gls)
2011–2013	Stjørdals-Blink	14	(10)
2014–2016	Levanger	51	(15)
2016–2018	Ranheim	36	(2)
2018	Levanger	11	(1)
2019	KÍ Klaksvík	21	(3)
2020–2021	Stjørdals-Blink	13	(0)
- * Club domestic league appearances and goals as of 17 December 2020

Simen Raaen Sandmæl (born 4 August 1990) is a former Norwegian footballer.

== Career ==
Sandmæl started his career at Remyra as a junior, he then moved to Stjørdals-Blink in 2011. After two season in Stjørdals-Blink, he then moved to Levanger in 2014. He moved to Ranheim in 2016.

Sandmæl made his debut for Ranheim in a 2-1 loss against FK Jerv.

Sandmæl went back to Levanger on 14 August 2018. On 9 January 2019, Sandmæl signed with KÍ Klaksvík.

== Career statistics ==
As of 17 December 2020

Season	Club	Division	League		Cup		Europe		Total	
Season	Club	Division	Apps	Goals	Apps	Goals	Apps	Goals	Apps	Goals
2014	Levanger	2. divisjon	24	12	2	0	0	0	26	12
2015	Levanger	1. divisjon	27	3	3	0	0	0	30	3
2016	Ranheim	1. divisjon	19	1	2	0	0	0	21	1
2017	Ranheim	1. divisjon	11	0	0	0	0	0	11	0
2018	Ranheim	Eliteserien	6	1	2	0	0	0	8	1
2018	Levanger	1. divisjon	11	1	0	0	0	0	11	1
2019	KÍ Klaksvík	Betri Deildin	21	3	4	1	6	1	31	5
2020	Stjørdals-Blink	1. divisjon	13	0	0	0	0	0	13	0
Career Total			132	21	11	1	6	1	149	23

== Honours ==
KÍ Klaksvík

- Faroese Premier League (1): 2019
