= George Lewis (footballer, born 2000) =

Rwandan footballer

Personal information
- Full name: George Lewis Igaba-Ishimwe Maniraguha
- Date of birth: 16 June 2000 (age 26)
- Place of birth: Kigali, Rwanda
- Height: 1.70 m (5 ft 7 in)
- Position: Forward

Team information
- Current team: Stjørdals-Blink
- Number: 25

Youth career
- 2005–2013: Stakkevollan IF
- 2014: Tromsdalen
- 2015–2016: Tromsø
- 2017–2018: Tromsdalen

Senior career*
Years	Team	Apps	(Gls)
2015–2016	Tromsø 3	4	(0)
2017–2019	Tromsdalen 2	35	(32)
2018–2019	Tromsdalen	3	(0)
2019–2020	Fram Larvik	2	(0)
2020–2023	Arsenal	0	(0)
2024	Zviahel	8	(2)
2025	Mjølner	7	(3)
2025	Strindheim	13	(6)
2026–	Stjørdals-Blink	23	(0)
- * Club domestic league appearances and goals as of 15 November 2026

George Lewis Igaba-Ishimwe Maniraguha (born 16 June 2000) is a Rwandan professional footballer who plays as a forward for Stjørdals-Blink.

== Early life ==
Born in Kigali, Rwanda, Lewis moved to Tanzania at the age of one. He then moved to Norway at the age of four, starting his career at local side Stakkevollan IF, before moving to Tromsdalen, and later Tromsø in 2015. He mostly played for the reserve teams of both clubs, notably notching 32 goals in 35 appearances over three seasons for Tromsdalen's reserve team.

== Club career ==
Lewis went on trial with English Premier League side Arsenal in March 2020, having previously trained with local side Solihull United, as well as Bournemouth and Ipswich Town.

Lewis joined Arsenal in August 2020, signing a professional contract]. He reportedly signed a two-year deal with the North London club. The move was seen as a surprise, as Lewis had only played in the Norwegian second and third divisions, and had no youth international caps.

He scored in his first appearance for Arsenal's under-21 side, in a 2–1 win over Ipswich Town in the EFL Trophy.

== International career ==
Eligible to represent both Rwanda and Norway, Lewis has stated his preference by saying that he is Norwegian, having grown up in Tromsø.

== Career statistics ==
=== Club ===
As of 14 May 2026.

Appearances and goals by club, season and competition
Club	Season	League			National Cup		League Cup		Europe		Other		Total	
Club	Season	Division	Apps	Goals	Apps	Goals	Apps	Goals	Apps	Goals	Apps	Goals	Apps	Goals
Tromsø 3	2015	4. divisjon	1	0	—		—		—		0	0	1	0
Tromsø 3	2016	4. divisjon	3	0	—		—		—		0	0	3	0
Tromsø 3	Total		4	0	0	0	0	0	0	0	0	0	4	0
Tromsdalen 2	2017	4. divisjon	15	13	—		—		—		0	0	15	13
Tromsdalen 2	2018	4. divisjon	16	17	—		—		—		0	0	16	17
Tromsdalen 2	2019	4. divisjon	4	2	—		—		—		0	0	4	2
Tromsdalen 2	Total		35	32	0	0	0	0	0	0	0	0	35	32
Tromsdalen	2018	OBOS-ligaen	3	0	0	0	—		—		0	0	3	0
Tromsdalen	2019	OBOS-ligaen	0	0	0	0	—		—		0	0	0	0
Tromsdalen	Total		3	0	0	0	0	0	0	0	0	0	3	0
Fram Larvik	2019	PostNord-ligaen	2	0	0	0	—		—		0	0	2	0
Fram Larvik	2020	PostNord-ligaen	0	0	0	0	—		—		0	0	0	0
Fram Larvik	Total		2	0	0	0	0	0	0	0	0	0	2	0
Arsenal U21	2020–21	—									1 (Note: Appearances in the EFL Trophy)	1	1	1
Zviahel	2023–24	Ukrainian Second League	8	2	0	0	—		—		0	0	8	2
Mjølner	2025	4. divisjon	7	3	3	2	—		—		0	0	10	5
Strindheim	2025	2. divisjon	13	6	1	0	—		—		0	0	14	6
Stjørdals-Blink	2026	2. divisjon	7	0	0	0	—		—		0	0	7	0
Career total			78	43	4	2	0	0	0	0	1	1	83	46
