= Amer Ordagić =

Bosnian footballer

Personal information
- Full name: Amer Ordagić
- Date of birth: 5 May 1993 (age 33)
- Place of birth: Tuzla, Bosnia and Herzegovina
- Height: 1.81 m (5 ft 11 1/2 in)
- Position: Defensive midfielder

Team information
- Current team: 07 Vestur
- Number: 8

Youth career
- 2004–2012: Gradina

Senior career*
Years	Team	Apps	(Gls)
2012–2013	Gradina	14	(0)
2013–2015	Zvijezda Gradačac	48	(3)
2015–2018	Sloboda Tuzla	69	(4)
2017–2021	Brann	34	(1)
2021–2023	Sandefjord	33	(0)
2023–2024	Tuzla City	18	(0)
2024–	07 Vestur	8	(0)
- * Club domestic league appearances and goals as of 27 October 2024

Amer Ordagić (born 5 May 1993) is a Bosnian professional footballer who plays as a defensive midfielder for Faroe Islands Premier League club 07 Vestur.

== International career ==
On 9 January 2018, Ordagić was named in the Bosnia and Herzegovina preliminary squad for two friendly fixtures versus the United States and Mexico, but did not make the final team.

== Career statistics ==
=== Club ===
As of match played 5 December 2021.

Appearances and goals by club, season and competition
Club	Season	League			Cup		Europe		Total	
Club	Season	Division	Apps	Goals	Apps	Goals	Apps	Goals	Apps	Goals
Gradina	2012–13	Bosnian Premier League	14	0	0	0	–		14	0
Gradina	Total		14	0	0	0	–		14	0
Zvijezda Gradačac	2012–13	Bosnian Premier League	13	2	0	0	–		13	2
Zvijezda Gradačac	2013–14	Bosnian Premier League	13	1	1	0	–		14	1
Zvijezda Gradačac	2014–15	Bosnian Premier League	22	0	0	0	–		22	0
Zvijezda Gradačac	Total		48	3	1	0	–		49	3
Sloboda Tuzla	2015–16	Bosnian Premier League	28	4	6	0	–		34	4
Sloboda Tuzla	2016–17	Bosnian Premier League	25	0	0	0	2	0	27	0
Sloboda Tuzla	2017–18	Bosnian Premier League	16	0	1	0	–		17	0
Sloboda Tuzla	Total		69	4	7	0	2	0	78	4
Brann	2018	Eliteserien	8	1	4	0	–		12	1
Brann	2019	Eliteserien	14	0	2	1	2	0	18	1
Brann	2020	Eliteserien	12	0	0	0	–		12	0
Brann	Total		34	1	6	1	2	0	42	2
Sandefjord	2021	Eliteserien	17	0	0	0	–		17	0
Sandefjord	2022	Eliteserien	0	0	0	0	–		0	0
Sandefjord	Total		17	0	0	0	0	0	17	0
Career total			182	8	14	1	4	0	200	9
