= Ivar Furu =

Norwegian footballer (born 1994)

Personal information
- Full name: Ivar Erlien Furu
- Date of birth: 7 May 1994 (age 32)
- Place of birth: Trondheim, Norway
- Height: 1.91 m (6 ft 3 in)
- Position: Defender

Team information
- Current team: Gamle Oslo

Youth career
- –2010: Sunndal
- 2010–2013: Molde

Senior career*
Years	Team	Apps	(Gls)
2011–2014	Molde	0	(0)
2014	→ KR (loan)	7	(0)
2014	Ranheim	0	(0)
2015–2017	Byåsen	71	(2)
2018–2019	Ranheim	46	(0)
2020–2021	Kristiansund	12	(0)
2022–	Gamle Oslo	8	(1)

International career
2010	Norway U16	7	(0)
2011	Norway U17	10	(2)
2012	Norway U18	12	(0)
2013	Norway U19	7	(0)
2013	Norway U23	1	(0)
- * Club domestic league appearances and goals as of 20 May 2021

Ivar Erlien Furu (born 7 May 1994) is a Norwegian footballer who plays for Gamle Oslo.

Furu was born in Trondheim, and grew up in Sunndalsøra.

== Career ==
Furu played for Molde as a junior, he then moved to KR in 2014 on loan. He went to Byåsen in 2015. Furu signed with Ranheim in 2017.

He made his debut for Ranheim in Eliteserien in a 2–1 win against Sandefjord.

In December 2019, Furu signed with Kristiansund

== Career statistics ==
As of 20 May 2021

Season	Club	Division	League		Cup		Europe		Total	
Season	Club	Division	Apps	Goals	Apps	Goals	Apps	Goals	Apps	Goals
2011	Molde	Tippeligaen	0	0	1	0	0	0	1	0
2012	Molde	Tippeligaen	0	0	1	0	1	0	2	0
2013	Molde	Tippeligaen	0	0	1	0	0	0	1	0
2014	KR	Úrvalsdeild	7	0	0	0	0	0	7	0
2014	Ranheim	1. divisjon	0	0	0	0	–		0	0
2015	Byåsen	2. divisjon	24	1	2	1	–		26	2
2016	Byåsen	2. divisjon	23	0	1	0	–		24	0
2017	Byåsen	2. divisjon	24	1	2	1	–		26	2
2018	Ranheim	Eliteserien	19	0	3	0	–		22	0
2019	Ranheim	Eliteserien	27	0	4	0	–		31	0
2020	Kristiansund	Eliteserien	10	0	–		–		10	0
2021	Kristiansund	Eliteserien	2	0	0	0	–		2	0
Career Total			136	2	15	2	1	0	152	4
