= Svein Maalen =

Norwegian football coach

Personal information
- Date of birth: 25 February 1978 (age 48)
- Place of birth: Trondheim, Norway

Managerial career
- Years: Team
- 2011–2012: Kattem (women)
- 2013–2015: Ranheim (assistant)
- 2015–2021: Ranheim
- 2022–: Rosenborg (development coach)
- 2023: Rosenborg (interim)

Svein Maalen (born 25 February 1978) is a Norwegian football coach.

Maalen has previously worked at Rosenborg as a junior coach and worked with analytics. In the 2011 and 2012 season, Maalen was head coach of Kattem IL's women's team. They finished in ninth and eleventh place in the seasons Maalen was in charge of the team. He became assistant coach in Ranheim in 2013, a side then playing in 1. divisjon, the second tier of the Norwegian football league system. Ranheim's head coach Trond Nordsteien was sacked in May 2015, and Maalen took over as an interim head coach for a short period before the position was given to Ola By Rise for the rest of the 2015 season. Svein Maalen was appointed as Ranheim's head coach on a permanent basis in October 2015. He led Ranheim to promotion to Eliteserien by winning the 2017 Eliteserien play-offs. Despite coaching the club with the lowest budget in the league, Maalen and Ranheim managed to stay up in their first season back in the top division. They finished the 2018 Eliteserien in seventh place, and Maalen received the Eliteserien Coach of the Year award for this accomplishment.

== Managerial statistics ==
As of match played 3 December 2023

Managerial record by team and tenure
Team	From	To	Record				
Team	From	To	P	W	D	L	Win %
Ranheim (caretaker)	31 May 2015	7 June 2015	3	1	1	1	33.33
Ranheim	28 October 2015	22 June 2021	179	74	35	70	41.34
Rosenborg (interim)	16 June 2023	14 December 2023	23	10	3	10	43.48
Total			205	85	39	81	41.46

== Honours ==
=== Individual ===
- Eliteserien Coach of the Year: 2018
