= Daniel Kvande =

Norwegian footballer (born 1995)

Personal information
- Full name: Daniel Kvande
- Date of birth: 8 April 1995 (age 31)
- Place of birth: Trondheim, Norway
- Position: Defender

Youth career
- –2012: Rosenborg

Senior career*
Years	Team	Apps	(Gls)
2013–2014	Byåsen	36	(12)
2015–2023	Ranheim	193	(9)

International career
2011	Norway U16	2	(1)
2012	Norway U17	2	(0)
- * Club domestic league appearances and goals as of 6 December 2023

Daniel Kvande (born 8 April 1995) is a Norwegian footballer who plays as a defender.

== Career ==
Kvande started his career at Rosenborg as a junior, he then moved to Byåsen in 2013. Kvande signed with Ranheim in 2015.

Kvande made his debut for Ranheim in Eliteserien in a 4-1 win against Stabæk.

On 13 November 2023, Ranheim announced that several players will leave the club on 31 December 2023, including Kvande.

== Career statistics ==
As of 24 June 2023

Season	Club	Division	League		Cup		Total	
Season	Club	Division	Apps	Goals	Apps	Goals	Apps	Goals
2013	Byåsen	2. divisjon	12	2	2	1	14	3
2014	Byåsen	2. divisjon	24	10	2	0	26	10
2015	Ranheim	OBOS-ligaen	19	0	1	0	20	0
2016	Ranheim	OBOS-ligaen	27	3	2	1	29	4
2017	Ranheim	OBOS-ligaen	29	2	1	0	30	2
2018	Ranheim	Eliteserien	30	0	4	1	34	1
2019	Ranheim	Eliteserien	25	1	5	1	30	2
2020	Ranheim	OBOS-ligaen	29	2	0	0	29	2
2021	Ranheim	OBOS-ligaen	24	1	3	0	27	1
2022	Ranheim	OBOS-ligaen	5	0	0	0	5	0
2023	Ranheim	OBOS-ligaen	4	0	4	0	8	0
Career Total			228	21	24	4	252	24
