= Even Barli =

Norwegian footballer (born 1991)

Personal information
- Full name: Even Barli
- Date of birth: 24 July 1991 (age 35)
- Place of birth: Verdal Municipality, Norway
- Height: 1.87 m (6 ft 1 1/2 in)
- Position: Goalkeeper

Youth career
- –2008: Verdal
- 2008–2011: Rosenborg

Senior career*
Years	Team	Apps	(Gls)
2009–2011	Rosenborg	0	(0)
2012–2020	Ranheim	249	(0)

International career^{‡}
2007	Norway U-16	1	(0)
2012	Norway U-23	1	(0)
- * Club domestic league appearances and goals as of 14 December 2020 ‡ National team caps and goals as of 3 April 2018

Even Barli (born 24 July 1991) is a former Norwegian footballer.

== Career ==
Barli was reserve goalkeeper in Rosenborg from 2009 to 2011, but did not play a single game there, so in 2012 he transferred to Ranheim.

Barli made his debut for Ranheim in starting 11 in a 3-1 win in an OBOS-ligaen game against Tromsdalen.

After the 2020 season Barli decide to retire to focus on his family and day job.

== Career statistics ==
As of 14 December 2020

Season	Club	Division	League		Cup		Europe		Total	
Season	Club	Division	Apps	Goals	Apps	Goals	Apps	Goals	Apps	Goals
2009	Rosenborg	Tippeligaen	0	0	0	0	0	0	0	0
2010	Rosenborg	Tippeligaen	0	0	0	0	0	0	0	0
2011	Rosenborg	Tippeligaen	0	0	0	0	0	0	0	0
2012	Ranheim	Adeccoligaen	28	0	0	0	0	0	28	0
2013	Ranheim	Adeccoligaen	27	0	3	0	0	0	30	0
2014	Ranheim	1. Divisjon	30	0	3	0	0	0	33	0
2015	Ranheim	OBOS-ligaen	25	0	2	0	0	0	27	0
2016	Ranheim	OBOS-ligaen	30	0	2	0	0	0	32	0
2017	Ranheim	OBOS-ligaen	30	0	3	0	0	0	33	0
2018	Ranheim	Eliteserien	30	0	2	0	0	0	32	0
2019	Ranheim	Eliteserien	29	0	3	0	0	0	32	0
2020	Ranheim	OBOS-ligaen	20	0	0	0	0	0	20	0
Career Total			249	0	18	0	0	0	267	0
