= Tillerbyen FK =

Norwegian football club

- Full name: Tillerbyen Fotballklubb
- Founded: 9 September 2013; 12 years ago
- Ground: TOBB Arena Sør; Trondheim
- Capacity: 1,000
- Chairman: Tore Havda
- Head coach: Jørn Andrè Hugdal
- League: 3. divisjon
- 2015: 2. Divisjon group 4, 13th (relegated)
Home colours

Tillerbyen FK was a Norwegian football club from Sør-Trøndelag. The club was created as a cooperation between Melhus IL and Tiller IL. The club played in the 2. divisjon, after being promoted from the 3. divisjon in 2013, only to return to the 3. Divisjon.

== History ==
After the 2012 season, the football teams of Melhus IL and Tiller IL decided to field one cooperative team in the 3. divisjon. The team was known as Melhus/Tiller during the 2013 season, in which they won promotion to the 2. divisjon. The club played its matches at Melhus' ground. Ahead of the 2014 season, the cooperation evolved into an own club which was named Rødde FK, named after a folk high school located between Melhus and Tiller.

The team fielded as Rødde FK during the 2014 season and 2015 season. Ahead of the 2016 season, the cooperation evolved into an own club which was named Tillerbyen FK, named after a location of the club. In 2018 it was decided to merge Tillerbyen FK into Tiller IL from 1 January 2019, and Tiller IL took Tillerbyen FK's place in 3. Divisjon i 2019.

== Recent history ==
| Season | | Pos. | Pl. | W | D | L | GS | GA | P | Cup | Notes |
|---|---|---|---|---|---|---|---|---|---|---|---|
| 2013 | 3. divisjon | ↑1 | 26 | 18 | 5 | 3 | 73 | 39 | 59 | Second round | Promoted to the 2. divisjon |
| 2014 | 2. divisjon | 8 | 26 | 9 | 6 | 11 | 44 | 54 | 33 | First round | |
| 2015 | 2. divisjon | ↓ 13 | 26 | 5 | 6 | 15 | 32 | 55 | 21 | Second round | Relegated to the 3. divisjon |
| 2016 | 3. divisjon | 5 | 26 | 14 | 4 | 8 | 66 | 40 | 46 | First qualifying round | |
| 2017 | 3. divisjon | 10 | 26 | 10 | 5 | 11 | 47 | 50 | 35 | First round | |
