= IL Stjørdals-Blink =

Norwegian sports club

- Full name: Idrettslaget Stjørdals-Blink
- Founded: 1910 (merger in 1956)
- Ground: M.U.S Stadion Sandskogan, Stjørdalshalsen
- Head coach: Snorre Lillebo
- League: 2. divisjon
- 2024: 2. divisjon, 7th of 14
- Website: https://blinkfotball.no/
Home colours	Away colours

Idrettslaget Stjørdals-Blink is a Norwegian sports club from Stjørdalshalsen, Trøndelag. It has sections for association football, team handball, volleyball, track and field, orienteering, cycling, swimming, gymnastics, speed skating, and Nordic skiing.

== History ==
=== Establishment ===
It was established in 1956 as a merger between Stjørdal IL (the former AIF club Stjørdal AIL) and IL Blink. The club counts 1910 as its founding year.

=== Recent years ===
The men's football team currently plays in the 1. divisjon, the second tier of the Norwegian football league system. The club also played several seasons in the 2. divisjon during the 1990s until the relegation in 1998. Stjørdals-Blink then won its 3. divisjon group and contested play-offs to the 2. divisjon in 2000, won, but was relegated again in the following 2001 season. It won its 3. divisjon group and contested play-offs in 2004 and 2010, but failed. In 2019 Stjørdals-Blink promoted to Norwegian First Division.

== Recent history ==
Season		Pos.	Pl.	W	D	L	GS	GA	P	Cup	Notes
2009	3. divisjon	4	22	12	3	7	51	41	39	1st qualifying round	
2010	3. divisjon	1	22	18	1	3	81	28	55	1st round	Lost promotion play-offs
2011	3. divisjon	2	24	15	4	5	90	37	49	2nd round	
2012	3. divisjon	2	24	18	2	4	89	20	56	2nd round	
2013	3. divisjon	2	26	18	2	6	81	48	56	1st round	
2014	3. divisjon	↑ 1	26	23	0	3	136	20	69	2nd qualifying round	Promoted
2015	2. divisjon	7	26	11	5	10	42	44	38	2nd round	
2016	2. divisjon	↓ 8	26	12	2	12	53	40	38	4th round	Relegated
2017	3. divisjon	↑ 1	26	19	2	5	81	45	59	2nd round	Promoted
2018	2. divisjon	11	26	7	7	12	39	48	28	2nd round	
2019	2. divisjon	↑ 1	26	18	6	2	69	22	60	2nd round	Promoted
2020	1. divisjon	14	30	8	9	13	52	59	33	Cancelled	
2021	1. divisjon	14	30	8	7	15	32	50	31	2nd round	
2022	1. divisjon	↓ 16	30	4	5	21	30	71	17	2nd round	Relegated
2023	2. divisjon	7	26	10	8	8	54	42	38	4th round	
2024	2. divisjon	7	26	13	5	8	57	35	44	2nd round	
2025	2. divisjon	8	26	11	2	13	45	45	35	2nd round	

== Current squad ==
As of 1 September 2026

Note: Flags indicate national team as defined under FIFA eligibility rules; some limited exceptions apply. Players may hold more than one non-FIFA nationality.

No.	Pos.	Nation	Player
1	GK	NOR	Erik Hansen Meidal
3	DF	NOR	Thomas Pedersen
4	DF	NOR	Jørgen Sønstebø (on loan from Rosenborg II)
5	DF	NOR	Marius Valle Fagerhaug (on loan from Ranheim)
6	MF	NOR	Sondre Stuen
7	MF	NOR	Elias Myrvågnes (on loan from Ranheim)
8	FW	CHI	Linton Ulloa Niinivirta
9	FW	NOR	Noah Solskjær
10	FW	NOR	Benjamin Feldt
11	FW	NOR	Viljar Kvande
12	GK	NOR	Lars Hilstad
13	GK	GER	Linus Bartsch

No.	Pos.	Nation	Player
14	DF	NOR	Nils Gunnar Eggen
15	DF	NOR	Henrik Simon Jørgensen
16	MF	NOR	Leo Haug Utkilen
18	FW	NOR	Marius Weidel
19	MF	NOR	Dennis Torp-Helland (on loan from Ranheim)
21	MF	NOR	Elias Sandrød (on loan from Rosenborg II)
22	MF	NOR	Alexander Kvalvik
23	FW	NOR	Petter Nilssen Einarson
24	DF	NOR	Jonas André Strand
25	FW	NOR	George Lewis
27	DF	NOR	Adrian Bartel
29	MF	NOR	Eskil Forren-Vik

=== Out on loan ===
Note: Flags indicate national team as defined under FIFA eligibility rules; some limited exceptions apply. Players may hold more than one non-FIFA nationality.

No.	Pos.	Nation	Player
17	MF	NOR	Gustav Støbakk (at Orkla FK until 31 December 2026)
