= Mads Reginiussen =

Norwegian footballer (born 1988)

Personal information
- Date of birth: 2 January 1988 (age 38)
- Place of birth: Alta, Norway
- Position: Midfielder

Youth career
- Alta

Senior career*
| Years | Team | Apps | (Gls) |
| 2005–2008 | Alta | 34 | (7) |
| 2009–2011 | Tromsø | 17 | (0) |
| 2011 | → Ranheim (loan) | 29 | (7) |
| 2012–2023 | Ranheim | 319 | (72) |

International career
| 2004 | Norway U16 | 3 | (0) |
| 2005 | Norway U17 | 2 | (0) |
| 2007 | Norway U19 | 3 | (0) |
- * Club domestic league appearances and goals as of 6 December 2023

Mads Reginiussen (born 2 January 1988) is a Norwegian former footballer who last played as a midfielder for Ranheim.

He signed a contract with Tromsø in 2009 and made his debut on 24 May 2009 against Lyn, a game they won 1-0.

He was loaned out to Ranheim in 2011, before he joined the club permanently in 2012.

In October 2023, Reginiussen announced his retirement at the end of the year.

== Personal life ==
He is the brother of Christian and Tore Reginiussen.

== Career statistics ==
As of match played 24 June 2023

Appearances and goals by club, season and competition
| Club | Season | League | | | National Cup | | Europe | | Total | |
| Club | Season | Division | Apps | Goals | Apps | Goals | Apps | Goals | Apps | Goals |
|---|---|---|---|---|---|---|---|---|---|---|
| Tromsø | 2009 | Tippeligaen | 6 | 0 | 1 | 0 | 1 | 0 | 8 | 0 |
| Tromsø | 2010 | Tippeligaen | 11 | 0 | 3 | 1 | - | | 14 | 1 |
| Tromsø | Total | | 17 | 0 | 4 | 1 | 1 | 0 | 22 | 1 |
| Ranheim (loan) | 2011 | Adeccoligaen | 29 | 7 | 3 | 1 | - | | 32 | 8 |
| Ranheim | 2012 | Adeccoligaen | 28 | 5 | 0 | 0 | - | | 28 | 5 |
| Ranheim | 2013 | Adeccoligaen | 28 | 5 | 3 | 0 | - | | 31 | 5 |
| Ranheim | 2014 | 1. divisjon | 27 | 3 | 4 | 1 | - | | 31 | 4 |
| Ranheim | 2015 | OBOS-ligaen | 30 | 9 | 2 | 0 | - | | 32 | 9 |
| Ranheim | 2016 | OBOS-ligaen | 29 | 7 | 2 | 1 | - | | 31 | 8 |
| Ranheim | 2017 | OBOS-ligaen | 29 | 10 | 3 | 0 | - | | 32 | 10 |
| Ranheim | 2018 | Eliteserien | 26 | 9 | 2 | 1 | - | | 28 | 10 |
| Ranheim | 2019 | Eliteserien | 29 | 5 | 4 | 3 | - | | 33 | 8 |
| Ranheim | 2020 | 1. divisjon | 28 | 10 | 0 | 0 | - | | 28 | 10 |
| Ranheim | 2021 | 1. divisjon | 26 | 2 | 2 | 1 | - | | 28 | 3 |
| Ranheim | 2022 | 1. divisjon | 23 | 6 | 1 | 0 | - | | 24 | 6 |
| Ranheim | 2023 | 1. divisjon | 12 | 1 | 3 | 0 | - | | 15 | 1 |
| Ranheim | Total | | 344 | 79 | 29 | 8 | - | - | 373 | 87 |
| Career total | | | 361 | 79 | 34 | 9 | 1 | 0 | 396 | 88 |
