= 2015 Norwegian Second Division =

2. divisjon
- Season: 2015
- Champions: KFUM Oslo, Raufoss, Ull/Kisa, Kongsvinger
- Top goalscorer: Gr. 1: Christer Johnsgård; Vegard Lysvoll (21 goals each); Gr. 2: Rocky Lekaj (28 goals); Gr. 3: Øyvind Gausdal (25 goals); Gr. 4: Mats Søvik Moldskred (17 goals)

The 2015 2. divisjon (often referred to as Oddsen-ligaen for sponsorship reasons) was a Norwegian football third-tier league. The league consisted of 56 teams divided into 4 groups of 14 teams. The winners of the four groups were promoted to the 1. divisjon, while the bottom three teams in each groups were relegated to the 3. divisjon.

The league was played as a double round-robin tournament, where all teams played 26 matches.

== League tables ==
=== Group 1 ===
| Pos | Team | Pld | W | D | L | GF | GA | GD | Pts | Promotion or relegation |
|---|---|---|---|---|---|---|---|---|---|---|
| 1 | KFUM Oslo (P) | 26 | 20 | 2 | 4 | 62 | 24 | +38 | 62 | Promotion to First Division |
| 2 | Tromsdalen | 26 | 18 | 3 | 5 | 71 | 27 | +44 | 57 | |
| 3 | Grorud | 26 | 17 | 3 | 6 | 71 | 30 | +41 | 54 | |
| 4 | Finnsnes | 26 | 15 | 4 | 7 | 53 | 45 | +8 | 49 | |
| 5 | Kjelsås | 26 | 13 | 7 | 6 | 62 | 33 | +29 | 46 | |
| 6 | Vålerenga 2 | 26 | 10 | 7 | 9 | 51 | 40 | +11 | 37 | |
| 7 | Stabæk 2 | 26 | 11 | 4 | 11 | 59 | 53 | +6 | 37 | |
| 8 | Harstad | 26 | 9 | 7 | 10 | 34 | 42 | −8 | 34 | |
| 9 | Skeid | 26 | 8 | 6 | 12 | 45 | 54 | −9 | 30 | |
| 10 | Senja | 26 | 9 | 3 | 14 | 48 | 59 | −11 | 30 | |
| 11 | Ullern | 26 | 6 | 7 | 13 | 33 | 47 | −14 | 25 | |
| 12 | Lyn (R) | 26 | 7 | 4 | 15 | 41 | 64 | −23 | 25 | Relegation to Third Division |
| 13 | Mjølner (R) | 26 | 5 | 3 | 18 | 21 | 67 | −46 | 18 | Relegation to Third Division |
| 14 | Holmen (R) | 26 | 3 | 2 | 21 | 19 | 85 | −66 | 11 | Relegation to Third Division |

Source: nifs.no
Rules for classification: 1) points; 2) goal difference; 3) number of goals scored.
(P) Promoted; (R) Relegated

=== Group 2 ===
| Pos | Team | Pld | W | D | L | GF | GA | GD | Pts | Promotion or relegation |
|---|---|---|---|---|---|---|---|---|---|---|
| 1 | Raufoss (P) | 26 | 20 | 4 | 2 | 76 | 28 | +48 | 64 | Promotion to First Division |
| 2 | Moss | 26 | 18 | 3 | 5 | 65 | 31 | +34 | 57 | |
| 3 | Kvik Halden | 26 | 16 | 5 | 5 | 59 | 25 | +34 | 53 | |
| 4 | Fram Larvik | 26 | 13 | 8 | 5 | 60 | 42 | +18 | 47 | |
| 5 | Notodden | 26 | 13 | 6 | 7 | 68 | 43 | +25 | 45 | |
| 6 | Alta | 26 | 12 | 6 | 8 | 65 | 43 | +22 | 42 | |
| 7 | Gjøvik-Lyn | 26 | 12 | 3 | 11 | 48 | 47 | +1 | 39 | |
| 8 | Nybergsund-Trysil | 26 | 9 | 9 | 8 | 50 | 49 | +1 | 36 | |
| 9 | Lørenskog | 26 | 9 | 6 | 11 | 47 | 40 | +7 | 33 | |
| 10 | Strømsgodset 2 | 26 | 10 | 2 | 14 | 55 | 61 | −6 | 32 | |
| 11 | Ørn-Horten | 26 | 6 | 6 | 14 | 29 | 48 | −19 | 24 | |
| 12 | Lillestrøm 2 (R) | 26 | 4 | 5 | 17 | 45 | 84 | −39 | 17 | Relegation to Third Division |
| 13 | Sprint-Jeløy (R) | 26 | 3 | 6 | 17 | 31 | 65 | −34 | 15 | Relegation to Third Division |
| 14 | Drammen FK (R) | 26 | 2 | 1 | 23 | 20 | 112 | −92 | 7 | Relegation to Third Division |

Source: nifs.no
Rules for classification: 1) points; 2) goal difference; 3) number of goals scored.
(P) Promoted; (R) Relegated

=== Group 3 ===
| Pos | Team | Pld | W | D | L | GF | GA | GD | Pts | Promotion or relegation |
|---|---|---|---|---|---|---|---|---|---|---|
| 1 | Ull/Kisa (P) | 26 | 18 | 4 | 4 | 51 | 24 | +27 | 58 | Promotion to First Division |
| 2 | Egersund | 26 | 16 | 7 | 3 | 55 | 22 | +33 | 55 | |
| 3 | Vard Haugesund | 26 | 14 | 9 | 3 | 66 | 37 | +29 | 51 | |
| 4 | Vidar | 26 | 10 | 10 | 6 | 60 | 44 | +16 | 40 | |
| 5 | Sola | 26 | 9 | 8 | 9 | 49 | 52 | −3 | 35 | |
| 6 | Vindbjart | 26 | 9 | 7 | 10 | 61 | 56 | +5 | 34 | |
| 7 | Arendal | 26 | 9 | 7 | 10 | 46 | 51 | −5 | 34 | |
| 8 | Odd 2 | 26 | 8 | 7 | 11 | 58 | 49 | +9 | 31 | |
| 9 | Flekkerøy | 26 | 8 | 7 | 11 | 30 | 44 | −14 | 31 | |
| 10 | Fana | 26 | 7 | 10 | 9 | 42 | 57 | −15 | 31 | |
| 11 | Fyllingsdalen | 26 | 8 | 5 | 13 | 44 | 50 | −6 | 29 | |
| 12 | Eidsvold Turn (R) | 26 | 7 | 7 | 12 | 47 | 53 | −6 | 28 | Relegation to Third Division |
| 13 | Donn (R) | 26 | 6 | 5 | 15 | 43 | 70 | −27 | 23 | Relegation to Third Division |
| 14 | Odda (R) | 26 | 6 | 1 | 19 | 40 | 83 | −43 | 19 | Relegation to Third Division |

Source: nifs.no
Rules for classification: 1) points; 2) goal difference; 3) number of goals scored.
(P) Promoted; (R) Relegated

=== Group 4 ===
| Pos | Team | Pld | W | D | L | GF | GA | GD | Pts | Promotion or relegation |
|---|---|---|---|---|---|---|---|---|---|---|
| 1 | Kongsvinger (P) | 26 | 20 | 2 | 4 | 63 | 19 | +44 | 62 | Promotion to First Division |
| 2 | Elverum | 26 | 12 | 6 | 8 | 47 | 35 | +12 | 42 | |
| 3 | Nardo | 26 | 12 | 5 | 9 | 39 | 37 | +2 | 41 | |
| 4 | HamKam | 26 | 10 | 10 | 6 | 51 | 44 | +7 | 40 | |
| 5 | Byåsen | 26 | 12 | 4 | 10 | 35 | 42 | −7 | 40 | |
| 6 | Florø | 26 | 11 | 6 | 9 | 43 | 32 | +11 | 39 | |
| 7 | Stjørdals-Blink | 26 | 11 | 5 | 10 | 42 | 44 | −2 | 38 | |
| 8 | Brumunddal | 26 | 10 | 7 | 9 | 33 | 36 | −3 | 37 | |
| 9 | Strindheim | 26 | 8 | 9 | 9 | 38 | 36 | +2 | 33 | |
| 10 | Førde | 26 | 9 | 6 | 11 | 47 | 48 | −1 | 33 | |
| 11 | Molde 2 | 26 | 9 | 4 | 13 | 38 | 40 | −2 | 31 | |
| 12 | Aalesund 2 (R) | 26 | 7 | 7 | 12 | 36 | 40 | −4 | 28 | Relegation to Third Division |
| 13 | Rødde (R) | 26 | 5 | 6 | 15 | 32 | 55 | −23 | 21 | Relegation to Third Division |
| 14 | Træff (R) | 26 | 5 | 5 | 16 | 27 | 63 | −36 | 20 | Relegation to Third Division |

Source: nifs.no
Rules for classification: 1) points; 2) goal difference; 3) number of goals scored.
(P) Promoted; (R) Relegated
