= Strindheim IL =

Norwegian sports club

Strindheim
- Full name: Strindheim Idrettslag
- Nickname: SIL
- Founded: 17 January 1948; 78 years ago
- Ground: Strindheim kunstgress, Trondheim, Norway
- Manager: John Pelu
- League: 2. divisjon
- 2025: 2. divisjon, group 2, 12th of 14 (relegated)
Home colours	Away colours

Strindheim Idrettslag is a Norwegian multisports club located in Trondheim. It has sections for athletics, handball, football, speed skating, and cross-country skiing. The cross-country ski team has several world cup competitors (see separate article for Petter Northug). The football team currently plays in the 3. divisjon after being promoted from 4. divisjon in 2018.

== Football team ==
Strindheim's football team competed in the top tier of Norwegian football in 1984 and 1995. Strindheim relegated from 2. divisjon in 2011 and promoted back to the third tier the following season. They were again relegated to 3. divisjon in 2013 and was promoted to 2. divisjon in 2014. The team was relegated from 2. divisjon in 2016 and again relegated in 2017. The football team currently plays in the 2. divisjon after being promoted from 3. divisjon in 2023.

=== Recent history ===
Season		Pos.	Pl.	W	D	L	GS	GA	P	Cup	Notes
2006	2. divisjon	5	26	12	4	10	53	48	40	Second round	
2007	2. divisjon	4	26	15	4	7	69	40	49	Second round	
2008	2. divisjon	8	26	10	7	9	49	44	37	First round	
2009	2. divisjon	10	26	11	1	14	41	48	34	Third round	
2010	2. divisjon	7	26	8	9	9	33	42	33	Second round	
2011	2. divisjon	↓ 13	26	5	6	15	39	68	21	First round	Relegated to the 3. divisjon
2012	3. divisjon	↑ 1	26	22	2	2	81	27	68	First round	Promoted to the 2. divisjon
2013	2. divisjon	↓ 12	26	6	5	15	51	60	23	Second round	Relegated to the 3. divisjon
2014	3. divisjon	↑ 1	26	23	1	2	97	25	70	First round	Promoted to the 2. divisjon
2015	2. divisjon	9	26	8	9	9	38	36	33	Second round	
2016	2. divisjon	↓ 10	26	8	6	12	50	60	30	First round	Relegated to the 3. divisjon
2017	3. divisjon	↓ 12	26	9	5	12	53	64	32	First round	Relegated to the 4. divisjon
2018	4. divisjon	↑ 1	22	18	1	3	111	32	55	First round	Promoted to the 3. divisjon
2019	3. divisjon	2	26	14	4	8	59	46	46	Second qualifying round	
2021	3. divisjon	3	13	7	5	1	33	17	26	First round	
2022	3. divisjon	4	26	14	3	9	74	48	45	Third round	
2023	3. divisjon	↑ 1	26	23	0	3	88	25	69	Second round	Promoted to the 2. divisjon
2024	2. divisjon	11	26	9	3	14	44	46	30	Second round	
2025	2. divisjon	↓ 12	26	7	1	18	36	65	22	First round	Relegated to the 3. divisjon

== Current squad ==
As of 1 September 2025

Note: Flags indicate national team as defined under FIFA eligibility rules; some limited exceptions apply. Players may hold more than one non-FIFA nationality.

No.	Pos.	Nation	Player
1	GK	NOR	Kristian Melting
2	DF	NOR	Sivert Falle Risan
3	DF	NOR	Ole Brautset
4	DF	NOR	Lars Valderhaug
6	MF	NOR	Alexander Gløsen
7	MF	NOR	Niklas Saugestad
8	MF	NOR	Fredrik Lund
9	FW	NOR	Benjamin Feldt
10	FW	NOR	Johann Kosberg
11	FW	NOR	Patrick Singstad Johansen
12	GK	NOR	Elias Misje
14	DF	NOR	Fredrik Nyheim
16	DF	NOR	Thomas Nyheim
17	DF	NOR	Brede Andresen

No.	Pos.	Nation	Player
18	FW	NOR	Sigurd Gjærevoll
20	DF	NOR	Ask Angellsen
22	DF	NOR	Sander Kleppe Halgunset
24	FW	NOR	Tor-Håkon Amundsen
25	MF	NOR	Kristoffer Mørkved
26	DF	NOR	Noah Hynne Knoff
27	DF	NOR	Vegard Dønnem
29	MF	NOR	Viljar Kvande
30	FW	NOR	Mats Lervik
33	GK	NOR	Jonas Hovstein
39	MF	NOR	Erdem Kizilirmak
44	FW	NOR	George Lewis
55	DF	NOR	Henrik Standal
99	GK	NOR	Simen Rekstad-Johnsen
