= 2018 Eliteserien =

74th season of top-tier football league in Norway

Eliteserien
- Season: 2018
- Dates: 11 March – 24 November
- Champions: Rosenborg; 26th title
- Relegated: Sandefjord; Start
- Champions League: Rosenborg
- Europa League: Molde; Brann; Haugesund
- Matches: 240
- Goals: 672 (2.8 per match)
- Top goalscorer: Franck Boli (17 goals)
- Biggest home win: Molde 5–0 Sandefjord (11 March 2018)
- Biggest away win: Start 1–6 Vålerenga (14 April 2018)
- Highest scoring: Start 1–6 Vålerenga (14 April 2018)
- Longest winning run: Brann (7 games)
- Longest unbeaten run: Brann (14 games)
- Longest winless run: Sandefjord (15 games)
- Longest losing run: Sandefjord (8 games)
- Highest attendance: 21,201; Rosenborg 1–1 Ranheim (5 May 2018)
- Lowest attendance: 1,393; Ranheim 1–1 Sandefjord (19 August 2018)
- Average attendance: 5,865 ▼12.4%

The 2018 Eliteserien was the 74th completed season of top-tier football in Norway. This was second season of Eliteserien as rebranding from Tippeligaen.

The season began on 11 March and ended 24 November 2018, not including play-off matches. Fixtures for the 2018 season were announced on 19 December 2017. Rosenborg were the defending champions, while Bodø/Glimt, Start and Ranheim entered as the promoted teams from the 2017 1. divisjon.

Rosenborg won their fourth consecutive title, their 26th top-flight title overall, with one match to spare following a 1–0 away win against Start on 11 November 2018.

== Overview ==
=== Summary ===
Brann started the season well and won eight of their nine opening games. They lost their first match 0–4 against Molde in the 15th round. Rosenborg started the season poorly with no win in the first three games, but managed to tighten the gap to Brann. Head coach Kåre Ingebrigtsen was sacked on 19 July although Rosenborg was placed second in the league, two points behind Brann at the time.

On 11 November, Rosenborg were confirmed as Eliteserien champions following their 1–0 away win against Start in the 29th round. They won their fourth consecutive title and 26th top-flight title overall. Molde won eight of their final nine games and finished in second place, five points behind Rosenborg.

Sandefjord were the first team to be relegated to the 1. divisjon when they drew 1–1 against Sarpsborg 08 in their penultimate game. Before the 30th and final round, five teams were in risk of either relegation or relegation play-offs. Start lost 1–3 away to Haugesund and was relegated as the second team from bottom. Stabæk drew 2–2 against Strømsgodset after a goal by Strømsgodset's Mustafa Abdellaoue in the last minute of the game. That goal made sure Strømsgodset retained their spot in the next season's Eliteserien, while Stabæk were forced to play relegation play-offs. Stabæk won the play-offs against Aalesund 2–1 on aggregate and retained their spot in Eliteserien.

== Teams ==
Sixteen teams competed in the league – the top thirteen teams from the previous season, and three teams promoted from 1. divisjon. The promoted teams were Bodø/Glimt, Start (both returning to the top flight after a season's absence) and Ranheim (returned to the top flight after an absence of sixty-one years). They replaced Sogndal, Aalesund and Viking ending their top flight spells of two, eleven and twenty-nine years respectively.

=== Stadia and locations ===
Locations of the teams in 2018 Eliteserien

Note: Table lists in alphabetical order.

Team	Ap.	Location	Arena	Turf	Capacity
Bodø/Glimt	23	Bodø	Aspmyra Stadion	Artificial	5,635
Brann	61	Bergen	Brann Stadion	Natural	12,914 (Note: The capacity of Brann Stadion was reduced from 17,686 to 12,914 due to renovations.)
Haugesund	12	Haugesund	Haugesund Stadion	Natural	8,754
Kristiansund	2	Kristiansund	Kristiansund Stadion	Artificial	4,277
Lillestrøm	55	Lillestrøm	Åråsen Stadion	Natural	11,500
Molde	42	Molde	Aker Stadion	Artificial	11,249
Odd	37	Skien	Skagerak Arena	Artificial	11,767
Ranheim	8	Trondheim	EXTRA Arena	Artificial	3,000
Rosenborg	55	Trondheim	Lerkendal Stadion	Natural	21,421
Sandefjord	7	Sandefjord	Komplett Arena	Natural	6,582
Sarpsborg 08	7	Sarpsborg	Sarpsborg Stadion	Artificial	8,022
Stabæk	22	Bærum	Nadderud Stadion	Natural	4,938
Start	41	Kristiansand	Sør Arena	Artificial	14,448
Strømsgodset	31	Drammen	Marienlyst Stadion	Artificial	8,935
Tromsø	31	Tromsø	Alfheim Stadion	Artificial	6,687
Vålerenga	58	Oslo	Intility Arena	Artificial	16,555

=== Personnel and kits ===
Team	Manager	Captain	Kit manufacturer	Sponsor
Bodø/Glimt	(Norway) Kjetil Knutsen	(Norway) Martin Bjørnbak	Diadora	Sparebanken Nord-Norge
Brann	(Norway) Lars Arne Nilsen	(Netherlands) Vito Wormgoor	Nike	Sparebanken Vest
Haugesund	(Norway) Eirik Horneland	(Norway) Christian Grindheim	Macron	Haugaland Kraft
Kristiansund	(Norway) Christian Michelsen	(Norway) Dan Peter Ulvestad	Macron	SpareBank 1 Nordvest
Lillestrøm	(Sweden) Jörgen Lennartsson	(Norway) Frode Kippe	Puma	DNB
Molde	(Norway) Ole Gunnar Solskjær	(Norway) Ruben Gabrielsen	Nike	Sparebanken Møre
Odd	(Norway) Dag-Eilev Fagermo	(Norway) Steffen Hagen	Hummel	SpareBank 1 Telemark
Ranheim	(Norway) Svein Maalen	(Norway) Mads Reginiussen	Umbro	SpareBank 1 SMN
Rosenborg	(Netherlands) Rini Coolen (interim)	(Denmark) Mike Jensen	Adidas	SpareBank 1 SMN
Sandefjord	(Spain) Martí Cifuentes	(Norway) Håvard Storbæk	Macron	Jotun
Sarpsborg 08	(Norway) Geir Bakke	(Denmark) Patrick Mortensen	Select	Borregaard
Stabæk	(Norway) Henning Berg	(Norway) Andreas Hanche-Olsen	Macron	SpareBank 1 Østlandet
Start	(Norway) Kjetil Rekdal	(Norway) Simon Larsen	Macron	Sparebanken Sør
Strømsgodset	(Norway) Bjørn Petter Ingebretsen	(Norway) Jakob Glesnes	Puma	DNB
Tromsø	(Finland) Simo Valakari	(Norway) Simen Wangberg	Select	Sparebanken Nord-Norge
Vålerenga	(Norway) Ronny Deila	(Norway) Daniel Fredheim Holm	Umbro	DNB

=== Managerial changes ===
Team	Outgoing manager	Manner of departure	Date of vacancy	Table	Incoming manager	Date of appointment	Table
Start	(England) Mick Priest (interim)	End of caretaker spell	1 December 2017	Pre-season	(England) Mark Dempsey	1 December 2017	Pre-season
Sandefjord	(Norway) Lars Bohinen	Signed by Aalesund	20 December 2017	Pre-season	(Sweden) Magnus Powell	16 January 2018	Pre-season
Sandefjord	(Sweden) Magnus Powell	Sacked	25 April 2018	12th	(Norway) Geir Ludvig Fevang (interim)	27 April 2018	12th
Start	(England) Mark Dempsey	Sacked	18 May 2018	16th	(Iceland) Johannes Hardarson (interim)	19 May 2018	16th
Sandefjord	(Norway) Geir Ludvig Fevang (interim)	End of caretaker spell	31 May 2018	16th	(Spain) Martí Cifuentes	31 May 2018	16th
Start	(Iceland) Johannes Hardarson (interim)	End of caretaker spell	1 June 2018	15th	(Norway) Kjetil Rekdal	1 June 2018	15th
Strømsgodset	(Norway) Tor Ole Skullerud	Resigned	6 June 2018	12th	(Norway) Bjørn Petter Ingebretsen	7 June 2018	12th
Lillestrøm	(Norway) Arne Erlandsen	Sacked	26 June 2018	13th	(Norway) Arild Sundgot (interim)	26 June 2018	13th
Stabæk	(Spain) Antoni Ordinas	Sacked	27 June 2018	14th	(Norway) Jan Peder Jalland (interim) (Norway) Gaute Larsen (interim)	28 June 2018	14th
Stabæk	(Norway) Jan Peder Jalland (interim) (Norway) Gaute Larsen (interim)	End of caretaker spell	4 July 2018	14th	(Norway) Henning Berg	4 July 2018	14th
Lillestrøm	(Norway) Arild Sundgot (interim)	End of caretaker spell	13 July 2018	13th	(Sweden) Jörgen Lennartsson	13 July 2018	13th
Rosenborg	(Norway) Kåre Ingebrigtsen	Sacked	19 July 2018	2nd	(Netherlands) Rini Coolen (interim)	19 July 2018	2nd

== League table ==
Pos	Team	Pld	W	D	L	GF	GA	GD	Pts	Qualification or relegation
1	Rosenborg (C)	30	19	7	4	51	24	+27	64	Qualification for the Champions League first qualifying round (Note: Since the winners of the 2018 Norwegian Cup (Rosenborg) qualified for European competition based on league position, the spot awarded to the cup winners (Europa League first qualifying round) was passed to the second-placed team, while the spot awarded to the second-placed team (Europa League first qualifying round) was passed to the fourth-placed team.)
2	Molde	30	18	5	7	63	36	+27	59	Qualification for the Europa League first qualifying round
3	Brann	30	17	7	6	45	31	+14	58	Qualification for the Europa League first qualifying round
4	Haugesund	30	16	5	9	45	33	+12	53	Qualification for the Europa League first qualifying round
5	Kristiansund	30	13	7	10	46	41	+5	46	
6	Vålerenga	30	11	9	10	39	44	−5	42	
7	Ranheim	30	12	6	12	43	50	−7	42	
8	Sarpsborg 08	30	11	8	11	46	39	+7	41	
9	Odd	30	11	7	12	39	38	+1	40	
10	Tromsø	30	11	3	16	41	48	−7	36	
11	Bodø/Glimt	30	6	14	10	32	35	−3	32	
12	Lillestrøm	30	7	11	12	34	44	−10	32	
13	Strømsgodset	30	7	10	13	46	48	−2	31	
14	Stabæk (O)	30	6	11	13	37	50	−13	29	Qualification for the relegation play-offs
15	Start (R)	30	8	5	17	30	54	−24	29	Relegation to First Division
16	Sandefjord (R)	30	4	11	15	35	57	−22	23	Relegation to First Division

Source: Football Association of Norway (in Norwegian), Soccerway
Rules for classification: 1) Points; 2) Goal difference; 3) Goals scored; 4) Head-to-head points; 5) Head-to-head goal difference; 6) Head-to-head away goals scored (only if between two teams); 7) Head-to-head goals scored; 8) Play-off (only used to decide champions or relegation).
(C) Champions; (O) Play-off winners; (R) Relegated

== Positions by round ==
Team ╲ Round	1	2	3	4	5	6	7	8	9	10	11	12	13	14	15	16	17	18	19	20	21	22	23	24	25	26	27	28	29	30
Rosenborg	12	11	12	8	6	4	2	2	2	2	2	2	3	2	2	2	2	2	2	1	1	1	1	1	1	1	1	1	1	1
Molde	1	1	1	2	2	2	3	3	6	6	8	7	8	6	4	3	4	4	4	5	4	4	3	3	3	3	3	3	2	2
Brann	4	2	3	1	1	1	1	1	1	1	1	1	1	1	1	1	1	1	1	2	2	2	2	2	2	2	2	2	3	3
Haugesund	5	7	4	4	9	6	4	4	3	4	5	5	4	4	6	5	3	3	3	3	3	3	4	4	4	4	4	4	4	4
Kristiansund	11	11	8	11	10	11	11	10	10	10	10	10	9	9	9	8	8	8	9	8	9	10	9	10	8	7	7	5	5	5
Vålerenga	6	3	6	7	3	7	7	7	5	5	6	6	6	8	8	9	9	9	7	7	6	6	7	6	7	8	8	8	8	6
Ranheim	14	9	5	6	4	3	5	5	4	3	3	3	2	3	3	4	6	6	6	4	5	5	5	5	5	5	5	6	6	7
Sarpsborg 08	6	5	2	3	7	9	9	9	7	7	4	4	5	7	7	6	5	5	5	6	7	7	8	9	10	9	9	9	9	8
Odd	10	15	15	11	14	10	8	6	8	8	9	9	10	10	10	10	10	10	10	9	10	8	6	7	6	6	6	7	7	9
Tromsø	15	8	9	5	8	5	6	8	9	9	7	8	7	5	5	7	7	7	8	10	8	9	10	8	9	10	10	10	10	10
Bodø/Glimt	3	6	11	16	16	14	13	14	13	13	14	11	11	12	12	12	12	12	11	11	11	11	11	11	11	12	12	11	11	11
Lillestrøm	13	13	16	13	12	13	15	12	11	11	11	13	13	13	13	13	13	13	14	13	13	15	15	13	13	13	14	14	13	12
Strømsgodset	8	13	13	9	5	8	10	11	12	12	13	12	12	11	11	11	11	11	11	12	12	12	12	12	12	14	11	12	12	13
Stabæk	8	10	14	15	12	15	12	13	14	14	12	14	14	14	14	14	14	14	13	14	14	13	13	14	15	15	15	15	15	14
Start	2	4	7	10	14	16	16	16	16	16	15	15	15	15	15	15	15	15	15	15	15	14	14	15	14	11	13	13	14	15
Sandefjord	16	16	10	14	11	12	14	15	15	15	16	16	16	16	16	16	16	16	16	16	16	16	16	16	16	16	16	16	16	16

Leader / 2019–20 UEFA Champions League first qualifying round
2019–20 UEFA Europa League first qualifying round
Relegation play-offs
Relegation to 2019 1. divisjon

Source: nifs.no

== Relegation play-offs ==
The 14th-placed team, Stabæk takes part in a two-legged play-off against Aalesund, the winners of the 1. divisjon promotion play-offs, to decide who will play in the 2019 Eliteserien.

5 December 2018
18:00 CET (UTC+1)

Stabæk	1–0	Aalesund
Børkeeiet 27'	Report

Nadderud Stadion, Bærum
Attendance: 3,831
Referee: Svein Oddvar Moen
9 December 2018
18:00 CET (UTC+1)

Aalesund	1–1	Stabæk
O. Lie 30'	Report	Guèye 71' (o.g.)

Color Line Stadion, Ålesund
Attendance: 6,333
Referee: Tore Hansen

Stabæk won 2–1 on aggregate and retained their position in Eliteserien.

== Results ==
Home \ Away	BOD	BRA	HAU	KRI	LIL	MOL	ODD	RAN	ROS	SND	SRP	SBK	STA	STM	TRO	VÅL
Bodø/Glimt	—	2–2	0–3	3–0	3–1	0–1	1–1	4–0	0–1	1–1	3–1	1–1	1–2	2–2	0–1	1–1
Brann	2–0	—	1–1	1–0	1–1	0–4	1–0	1–0	1–2	1–1	2–0	3–0	4–1	3–1	3–0	0–0
Haugesund	1–0	1–3	—	3–2	2–2	0–1	2–0	2–0	1–2	4–2	1–1	2–0	3–1	1–0	1–0	1–0
Kristiansund	1–1	3–1	2–1	—	2–1	1–0	1–1	1–3	0–2	3–2	1–1	1–0	1–1	4–0	5–1	0–1
Lillestrøm	1–1	1–1	1–1	2–0	—	2–2	0–0	0–1	0–0	1–0	2–2	3–2	1–0	1–1	1–0	0–1
Molde	1–2	5–1	2–0	3–2	2–1	—	0–1	2–3	1–0	5–0	2–2	3–0	3–1	2–0	2–1	5–1
Odd	1–0	0–1	1–2	1–2	3–1	1–1	—	2–0	1–1	5–0	3–1	0–3	3–0	2–2	1–0	3–2
Ranheim	0–0	0–2	4–2	2–1	3–2	3–1	3–1	—	1–3	1–1	2–1	4–1	2–0	1–1	1–2	2–2
Rosenborg	1–1	1–2	1–0	2–2	3–0	4–0	3–1	1–1	—	1–1	3–1	1–1	2–0	4–3	2–1	3–0
Sandefjord	1–1	0–1	0–2	3–3	1–3	1–3	1–1	1–2	0–1	—	0–1	1–1	4–1	2–1	1–0	0–1
Sarpsborg 08	0–0	1–2	2–1	1–2	2–0	2–2	1–2	4–1	1–0	1–1	—	4–2	4–0	0–1	2–3	3–0
Stabæk	0–0	1–2	2–1	0–1	3–2	3–1	2–1	3–2	0–1	3–3	1–3	—	1–1	2–2	1–1	1–1
Start	1–0	0–1	0–1	2–0	3–0	1–3	0–1	0–0	0–1	1–4	1–0	2–1	—	1–1	4–1	1–6
Strømsgodset	4–0	1–1	0–1	2–3	2–2	1–2	3–0	3–0	0–1	2–0	1–2	2–2	1–1	—	2–4	2–0
Tromsø	1–2	2–1	1–2	0–0	1–2	2–4	2–1	4–0	2–1	4–1	0–2	0–0	1–2	3–1	—	3–0
Vålerenga	2–2	2–0	2–2	0–2	1–0	0–0	2–1	2–1	2–3	2–2	0–0	1–0	3–2	1–4	3–0	—

Source: Football Association of Norway (in Norwegian)
Legend: Blue = home team win; Yellow = draw; Red = away team win.

== Season statistics ==
=== Top scorers ===
Rank	Player	Club	Goals	Games	Average
1	(Ivory Coast) Franck Boli	Stabæk	17	29	0,59
2	(Norway) Marcus Pedersen	Strømsgodset	14	23	0,61
3	(Norway) Erling Haaland	Molde	12	25	0,48
3	(Denmark) Patrick Mortensen	Sarpsborg 08	12	28	0,43
3	(Norway) Thomas Lehne Olsen	Lillestrøm	12	29	0,41
6	(Liberia) Sam Johnson	Vålerenga	11	24	0,46
6	(Ivory Coast) Daouda Bamba	Kristiansund/Brann	11	29	0,38
8	(Norway) Bård Finne	Vålerenga	10	25	0,40
8	(Norway) Kristian Fardal Opseth	Bodø/Glimt	10	30	0,30
10	(Norway) Mads Reginiussen	Ranheim	9	26	0,35
10	(Norway) Steffen Lie Skålevik	Brann	9	28	0,32
10	(Norway) Bendik Bye	Kristiansund	9	30	0,30
10	(Nigeria) David Akintola	Haugesund	9	30	0,30

=== Hat-tricks ===
Player	For	Against	Result	Date
(Norway) Marcus Pedersen	Strømsgodset	Odd	3–0 (H)	15 April 2018
(Norway) Erling Haaland^{4}	Molde	Brann	4–0 (A)	1 July 2018
(Norway) Bendik Bye	Kristiansund	Strømsgodset	3–2 (A)	9 July 2018

Notes

^{4} Player scored 4 goals
(H) – Home team
(A) – Away team

=== Clean sheets ===
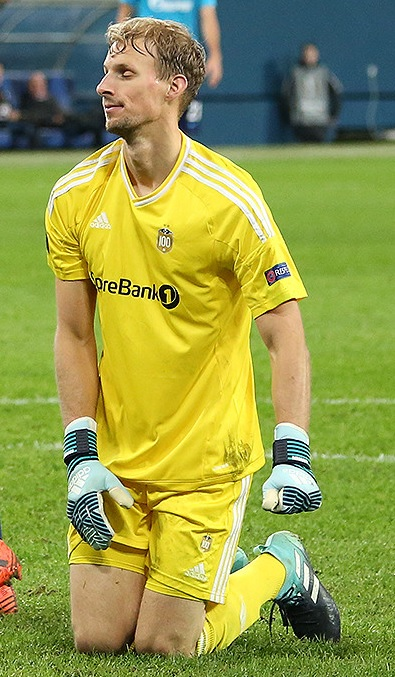
André Hansen of Rosenborg kept 12 clean sheets over the season, more than any other goalkeeper.

Rank	Player	Club	Clean sheets
1	(Norway) André Hansen	Rosenborg	12
2	(Austria) Samuel Şahin-Radlinger	Brann	11
3	(Ghana) Adam Larsen Kwarasey	Vålerenga	10
4	(Norway) Per Kristian Bråtveit	Haugesund	9
5	(Sweden) Andreas Linde	Molde	8
5	(Norway) Sondre Rossbach	Odd	8
7	(Germany) Jonas Deumeland	Start	5
7	(Norway) Aslak Falch	Sarpsborg 08	5
7	(Norway) Gudmund Kongshavn	Tromsø	5
7	(Republic of Ireland) Sean McDermott	Kristiansund	5

=== Discipline ===
==== Player ====
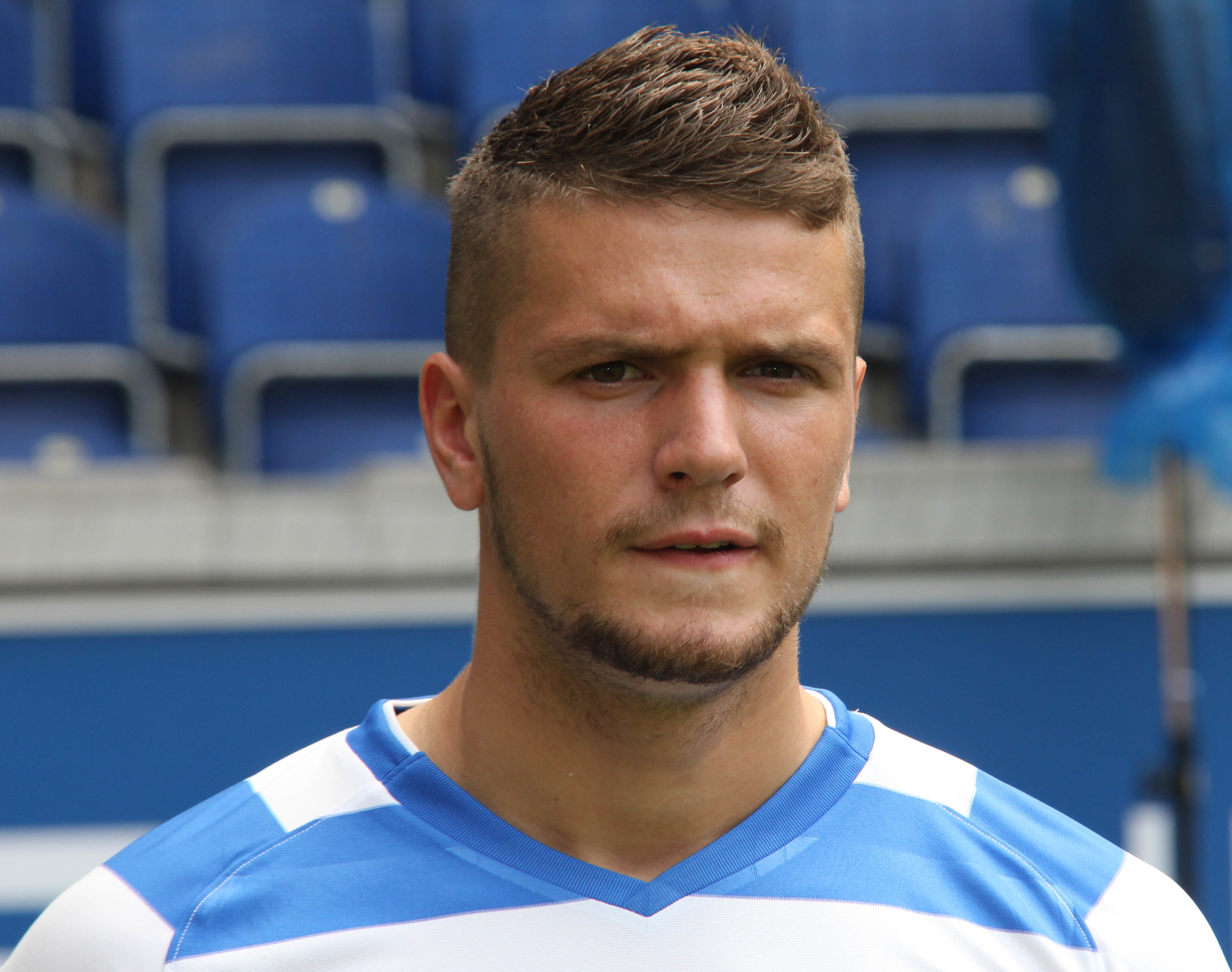
Flamur Kastrati received the most yellow cards this season with 10.

- Most yellow cards: 10
  - (Kosovo) Flamur Kastrati (Sandefjord/Kristiansund)
- Most red cards: 1
  - (Senegal) Aliou Coly (Kristiansund)
  - (Norway) Simon Larsen (Start)
  - (Norway) Mathias Normann (Molde)
  - (Denmark) Jacob Rasmussen (Rosenborg)
  - (Norway) Ivan Näsberg (Vålerenga)
  - (Norway) Lars-Jørgen Salvesen (Start)
  - (Iceland) Emil Pálsson (Sandefjord)
  - (Norway) Tokmac Nguen (Strømsgodset)
  - (Norway) Abdisalam Ibrahim (Vålerenga)
  - (Norway) Frode Kippe (Lillestrøm)
  - (Norway) Marius Amundsen (Lillestrøm)
  - (Norway) Ivar Furu (Ranheim)

==== Club ====
- Most yellow cards: 57
  - Start
- Most red cards: 2
  - Lillestrøm
  - Start
  - Vålerenga

=== Attendances ===
Pos	Team	Total	High	Low	Average	Change
1	Rosenborg	246,355	21,201	13,668	16,424	−6.6%
2	Brann	156,466	12,914	8,173	10,431	−12.0%
3	Vålerenga	137,700	14,740	6,063	9,180	−5.4%
4	Molde	106,661	9,444	6,218	7,111	−8.7%
5	Strømsgodset	89,088	7,587	5,199	5,939	−5.3%
6	Lillestrøm	83,393	10,409	3,842	5,560	−1.2%
7	Odd	80,746	6,761	4,466	5,383	−24.2%
8	Sarpsborg 08	75,074	6,149	4,365	5,005	+6.5%
9	Start	71,573	10,419	3,068	4,772	+16.6%
10	Haugesund	64,749	7,523	3,430	4,317	−3.1%
11	Kristiansund	60,629	4,277	3,753	4,042	+5.7%
12	Stabæk	54,833	4,561	3,035	3,656	−7.7%
13	Tromsø	54,828	5,214	2,908	3,655	+1.6%
14	Bodø/Glimt	48,282	4,731	2,615	3,219	+24.6%
15	Sandefjord	47,042	5,319	2,461	3,136	−21.8%
16	Ranheim	30,274	2,919	1,393	2,018	+191.6%
	League total	1,407,693	21,201	1,393	5,865	−12.4%

Updated to games played on 24 November 2018
Source: nifs.no

== Awards ==
Award	Winner	Club
Player of the Year	(Norway) André Hansen	Rosenborg
Breakthrough of the Year	(Norway) Erling Haaland	Molde
Manager of the Year	(Norway) Svein Maalen	Ranheim
Goal of the Year	(Norway) Jon-Helge Tveita	Sarpsborg 08
