= 2026 Viking FK season =

Viking FK 2026 football season

Viking
2026 season
- Chairman: Jan Henrik Jelsa
- Manager(s): Bjarte Lunde Aarsheim; Morten Jensen
- Stadium: Viking Stadion
- Eliteserien: 2nd
- Norwegian Cup: Quarter-final
- UEFA Champions League: League phase
- Top goalscorer: League: Peter Christiansen (19); All: Peter Christiansen (24)
- Highest home attendance: 15,900 vs List: Bodø/Glimt (Eliteserien, 11 April); Brann (Eliteserien, 18 April); Rosenborg (Eliteserien, 1 May); Start (Eliteserien, 16 May)
- Lowest home attendance: 7,120 vs Aalesund (Norwegian Cup, 18 March)
- Average home league attendance: 15,745
Home colours	Away colours
- All statistics correct as of 21 November 2026.

The 2026 season is Viking's 8th consecutive year in the Eliteserien, and their 76th season in the top flight of Norwegian football. The club participates in the 2026 Eliteserien, 2025–26 Norwegian Cup, 2026–27 Norwegian Cup and the 2026–27 UEFA Champions League. It is the club's sixth season with Bjarte Lunde Aarsheim and Morten Jensen as managers.

== Transfers ==
=== Transfers in ===
Date	Pos.	Name	From	Fee	Ref.
2 February 2026	GK	(Slovakia) Ľubomír Belko	(Slovakia) Žilina	Undisclosed	
12 March 2026	FW	(Ghana) Kelvin Frimpong	(Ghana) African Vikings Academy	Undisclosed	
28 May 2026	GK	(Norway) Erlend Jacobsen	Brodd	Undisclosed	
2 July 2026	FW	(Netherlands) Romano Postema	(Netherlands) Groningen	Undisclosed	
6 July 2026	FW	(Iceland) Amin Cosic	(Iceland) KR Reykjavík	Undisclosed	
2 September 2026	DF	(Netherlands) Essiën Bassey	(Netherlands) PSV Eindhoven	Undisclosed	
2 September 2026	FW	(Norway) Erik Botheim	(Sweden) Malmö FF	Undisclosed	
2 September 2026	MF	(Norway) Henrik Bjørdal	Vålerenga	Undisclosed	

=== Transfers out ===
Date	Pos.	Name	To	Fee	Ref.
31 December 2025	FW	(Norway) Sander Svendsen	Released (Note: Joined Konyaspor on 3 January 2026.)		
31 December 2025	MF	(Norway) Yann-Erik de Lanlay	Released (Note: Joined Sandnes Ulf on 26 February 2026.)		
13 January 2026	GK	(Norway) Kristoffer Klaesson	Aalesund	Undisclosed	
3 February 2026	MF	(Norway) Kasper Sætherbø	Egersund	Undisclosed	
11 February 2026	GK	(Norway) Aksel Bergsvik	Hødd	Undisclosed	
21 February 2026	GK	(Norway) Magnus Rugland Ree	Bryne	Undisclosed	
18 June 2026	FW	(Iceland) Hilmir Rafn Mikaelsson	(Czech Republic) Sigma Olomouc	Undisclosed	
31 August 2026	FW	(Norway) Edvin Austbø	(England) West Ham United	Undisclosed	

=== Loans in ===
Start date	Pos.	Name	From	End date	Ref.
4 August 2026	DF	(Norway) Jesper Daland	(Wales) Cardiff City	31 January 2027	

=== Loans out ===
Start date	Pos.	Name	To	End date	Ref.
7 January 2026	DF	(Norway) Fillip Voster Botnen	Sandnes Ulf	29 July 2026	
16 January 2026	FW	(Australia) Nicholas D'Agostino	(Australia) Brisbane Roar	30 June 2026	
31 March 2026	MF	(Norway) Ruben Alte	Sandefjord	13 July 2026	
7 July 2026	DF	(Australia) Franco Lino	(Australia) Melbourne Victory	30 June 2027	
10 August 2026	DF	(Norway) Fillip Voster Botnen	Sandnes Ulf	31 December 2026	
1 September 2026	MF	(Norway) Ruben Alte	(Denmark) Viborg	30 June 2027	
12 September 2026	MF	(Norway) Ola Visted	KFUM Oslo	31 December 2026	

== Competitions ==
=== Overall record ===
Competition	First match	Last match	Starting round	Final position	Record							
Competition	First match	Last match	Starting round	Final position	Pld	W	D	L	GF	GA	GD	Win %
Eliteserien	14 March 2026	13 December 2026	Matchday 1		27	20	2	5	71	30	+41	74.07
2025–26 Norwegian Cup	7 March 2026	18 March 2026	Fourth round	Quarter-final	2	1	0	1	4	2	+2	50.00
2026–27 Norwegian Cup	2 September 2026		First round		2	2	0	0	6	1	+5	100.00
UEFA Champions League	18 August 2026		Play-off round		6	2	2	2	14	13	+1	33.33
Total					37	25	4	8	95	46	+49	67.57

Last updated: 21 November 2026
Source: Competitions

=== Eliteserien ===
==== Table ====
Pos	Team	Pld	W	D	L	GF	GA	GD	Pts	Qualification or relegation
1	Bodø/Glimt (T)	27	21	2	4	67	25	+42	65	Qualification for the Champions League play-off round
2	Viking (T)	26	20	2	4	69	27	+42	62	Qualification for the Champions League second qualifying round
3	Rosenborg	26	14	4	8	53	32	+21	46	Qualification for the Conference League second qualifying round
4	Lillestrøm	26	14	3	9	39	35	+4	45	Qualification for the Conference League second qualifying round
5	Molde	27	13	5	9	66	48	+18	44	

Updated to match(es) played on 20 November 2026. Source: Football Association of Norway (in Norwegian)
Rules for classification: 1) Points; 2) Goal difference; 3) Goals scored; 4) Head-to-head points; 5) Head-to-head goal difference; 6) Head-to-head goals scored.
(T) Qualified, but not yet for the particular phase indicated

==== Results summary ====
Overall								Home						Away					
Pld	W	D	L	GF	GA	GD	Pts	W	D	L	GF	GA	GD	W	D	L	GF	GA	GD
27	20	2	5	71	30	+41	62	13	0	0	49	14	+35	7	2	5	22	16	+6

Last updated: 21 November 2026.
Source: see below

==== Results by round ====
Round	1	2	3	4	5	6	7	8	9	10	11	12	13	14	15	16	17	18	19	20	21	22	23	24	25	26	27	28	29	30
Ground	A	H	A	H	H	A	H	A	H	A	A	H	A	H	A	A	H	A	H	A	H	H	A	H	A	H	A	H	A	H
Result	L	W	W	W	W	W	W	W	W	W	W	W	L	W	D	W	W	L	W	D	W	W	W	W	L	W	L			
Position	11	6	3	2	2	2	2	2	1	1	1	1	1	1	1	1	1	1	1	2	2	1	1	1	1	1	2			

Updated to match(es) played on 21 November 2026. Source: NIFS
A = Away; H = Home; W = Win; D = Draw; L = Loss

==== Matches ====
The league fixtures were announced on 19 December 2025.

14 March 2026 1	HamKam	2–1	Viking	Hamar
16:00 CET	Udahl 36'; Mettler 38'	Report	Stensness 45+4'	Stadium: Briskeby Stadion; Attendance: 3,802; Referee: Marius Hansen Grøtta

21 March 2026 2	Viking	4–1	Molde	Stavanger
18:00 CET	Fuglestad 7', 61'; Heggheim 25', 32'	Report	Breivik 9'	Stadium: Viking Stadion; Attendance: 15,503; Referee: Sivert Amland

6 April 2026 3	Vålerenga	0–1	Viking	Oslo
14:30 CEST		Report	Kvia-Egeskog 45'	Stadium: Intility Arena; Attendance: 14,712; Referee: Tore Hansen

11 April 2026 4	Viking	5–0	Bodø/Glimt	Stavanger
18:00 CEST	Christiansen 5'; Askildsen 14'; Kvia-Egeskog 16', 74'; Tripić 87'	Report		Stadium: Viking Stadion; Attendance: 15,900; Referee: Espen Eskås

18 April 2026 5	Viking	3–2	Brann	Stavanger
18:00 CEST	K. Haugen 10'; Heggheim 42'; Bjørshol 90'	Report	Holm 37'; Soltvedt 58'	Stadium: Viking Stadion; Attendance: 15,900; Referee: Ola Hobber Nilsen

25 April 2026 6	Fredrikstad	1–2	Viking	Fredrikstad
16:00 CEST	Øhlenschlæger 65'	Report	Christiansen 45+4'; Stensness 59'	Stadium: Fredrikstad Stadion; Attendance: 7,612; Referee: Sigurd Kringstad

1 May 2026 7	Viking	3–0	Rosenborg	Stavanger
18:00 CEST	Falchener 2'; Askildsen 15'; Tripić 67'	Report		Stadium: Viking Stadion; Attendance: 15,900; Referee: Sivert Amland

10 May 2026 8	KFUM Oslo	0–2	Viking	Oslo
17:00 CEST		Report	Christiansen 2', 79'	Stadium: KFUM Arena; Attendance: 2,948; Referee: Marius Lien

16 May 2026 9	Viking	6–3	Start	Stavanger
16:00 CEST	Stensness 41'; Christiansen 46', 60'; Kvia-Egeskog 53'; Askildsen 63'; Tripić 85'	Report	Toure 3'; Mvoué 32'; Strannegård 45+1'	Stadium: Viking Stadion; Attendance: 15,900; Referee: Kristoffer Hagenes

24 May 2026 10	Kristiansund	1–2	Viking	Kristiansund
18:00 CEST	Alvheim 79'	Report	Kvia-Egeskog 2'; Falchener 72'	Stadium: Kristiansund Stadion; Attendance: 3,014; Referee: Mathias Støfringshaug

12 July 2026 13	Sarpsborg 08	1–0	Viking	Sarpsborg
19:15 CEST	Karlsbakk 22'	Report		Stadium: Sarpsborg Stadion; Attendance: 4,891; Referee: Marius Hansen Grøtta

18 July 2026 14	Viking	2–1	Sandefjord	Stavanger
18:00 CEST	Tripić 9' (pen.); Austbø 79'	Report	Patoulidis 54'	Stadium: Viking Stadion; Attendance: 15,606; Referee: Ola Hobber Nilsen

22 July 2026 11	Lillestrøm	1–2	Viking	Lillestrøm
19:00 CEST	Ranger 63'	Report	Askildsen 31'; Christiansen 55'	Stadium: Åråsen Stadion; Attendance: 8,177; Referee: Rohit Saggi
Note: The fixture was moved from 30 May after Viking had two players (Joe Bell and Henrik Falchener) called up for the 2026 FIFA World Cup.

26 July 2026 15	Aalesund	1–1	Viking	Ålesund
19:15 CEST	Christensen 46'	Report	Askildsen 45+1'	Stadium: Color Line Stadion; Attendance: 4,286; Referee: Stian Røvig Sletner

1 August 2026 16	Start	0–3	Viking	Kristiansand
18:00 CEST		Report	Tripić 5' (pen.); Christiansen 18'; Austbø 22'	Stadium: Sør Arena; Attendance: 14,001; Referee: Christian Moen

8 August 2026 17	Viking	2–1	Sarpsborg 08	Stavanger
16:00 CEST	Heggheim 40'; Tripić 90+5' (pen.)	Report	Sørli 81'	Stadium: Viking Stadion; Attendance: 15,759; Referee: Tore Hansen

14 August 2026 18	Rosenborg	2–1	Viking	Trondheim
19:00 CEST	E. Ceïde 15'; Chiakha 90+5'	Report	Christiansen 81'	Stadium: Lerkendal Stadion; Attendance: 17,566; Referee: Rohit Saggi

30 August 2026 19	Viking	2–1	Aalesund	Stavanger
17:00 CEST	Kvia-Egeskog 73', 90+4'	Report	Charles 4'	Stadium: Viking Stadion; Attendance: 15,601; Referee: Mathias Støfringshaug

4 September 2026 20	Sandefjord	1–1	Viking	Sandefjord
21:00 CEST	Børkeeiet 60'	Report	Bjørdal 90+4'	Stadium: Sandefjord Arena; Attendance: 3,860; Referee: Sigurd Kringstad

13 September 2026 21	Viking	8–1	Kristiansund	Stavanger
14:30 CEST	Christiansen 4'; Heggheim 6'; K. Haugen 20'; Botheim 29', 45+1'; Bjørdal 58'; Fuglestad 82'; Kvia-Egeskog 90+1'	Report	Alvheim 45+4'	Stadium: Viking Stadion; Attendance: 15,659; Referee: Espen Eskås

20 September 2026 22	Viking	3–0	Lillestrøm	Stavanger
17:00 CEST	K. Haugen 8'; Stensness 43'; Christiansen 79' (pen.)	Report		Stadium: Viking Stadion; Attendance: 15,740; Referee: Stian Røvig Sletner

9 October 2026 23	Brann	0–2	Viking	Bergen
19:00 CEST		Report	Heggheim 11'; Christiansen 20'	Stadium: Brann Stadion; Attendance: 17,800; Referee: Tore Hansen

17 October 2026 24	Viking	3–2	Fredrikstad	Stavanger
18:00 CEST	Kvia-Egeskog 7'; Christiansen 56', 57'	Report	Fiabema 27'; Wesseh 40'	Stadium: Viking Stadion; Attendance: 15,759; Referee: Marius Hansen Grøtta

25 October 2026 12	Viking	3–1	Tromsø	Stavanger
14:30 CET	Christiansen 18'; Heggheim 31'; Botheim 45+2'	Report	Grundt 90+3'	Stadium: Viking Stadion; Attendance: 15,712; Referee: Marius Lien
Note: Round 12 was rescheduled from 5 July to 25 October.

30 October 2026 25	Bodø/Glimt	3–2	Viking	Bodø
19:00 CET	Falchener 4' (o.g.); Helmersen 15'; Hauge 43'	Report	K. Haugen 32'; Botheim 39'	Stadium: Aspmyra Stadion; Attendance: 8,133; Referee: Espen Eskås

8 November 2026 26	Viking	5–1	KFUM Oslo	Stavanger
17:00 CET	Bjørdal 21'; Christiansen 45+4', 51', 61'; Fuglestad 90+2'	Report	Njie 55'	Stadium: Viking Stadion; Attendance: 15,750; Referee: Rohit Saggi

21 November 2026 27	Tromsø	3–2	Viking	Tromsø
14:00 CET	Innvær 5'; H. Larsen 53'; Warneryd 57'	Report	Christiansen 88' (pen.); Tripić 90+4'	Stadium: Alfheim Stadion; Attendance: 4,939; Referee: Tore Hansen

29 November 2026 28	Viking	v	Vålerenga	Stavanger
19:15 CET		Report		Stadium: Viking Stadion

4 December 2026 29	Molde	v	Viking	Molde
19:00 CET		Report		Stadium: Aker Stadion

13 December 2026 30	Viking	v	HamKam	Stavanger
17:00 CET		Report		Stadium: Viking Stadion

=== 2025–26 Norwegian Cup ===
7 March 2026 Fourth round	Bjarg	0–3	Viking	Bergen
16:00 CET		Report	Mikaelsson 37' (pen.); H. Haugen 83'; Alte 87'	Stadium: Stavollen Idrettsplass; Attendance: 2,000; Referee: Jørgen Haugen

18 March 2026 Quarter-final	Viking	1–2	Aalesund	Stavanger
18:00 CET	Visted 15'	Report	Andresen 65'; Christensen 75'	Stadium: Viking Stadion; Attendance: 7,120; Referee: Ola Hobber Nilsen

=== 2026–27 Norwegian Cup ===
2 September 2026 First round	Brodd	1–3	Viking	Stavanger
18:00 CEST	Taraldset 35'	Report	Hansen 51', 55'; H. Haugen 70'	Stadium: Midjord Kunstgras; Attendance: 2,500; Referee: Aleksander Vermundsen

1 October 2026 Second round	Madla	0–3	Viking	Stavanger
18:00 CEST		Report	Tripić 47'; Christiansen 50', 82'	Stadium: Madla Handelslag Stadion; Attendance: 2,447; Referee: Amir Ajjour

28 February 2027 Third round	Viking	v	KFUM Oslo	Stavanger
		Report		Stadium: Viking Stadion

=== UEFA Champions League ===
==== Qualifying ====
The play-off round draw was held on 3 August 2026.

Play-off round

18 August 2026 First leg	Dinamo Zagreb (Croatia)	2–2	(Norway) Viking	Zagreb, Croatia
21:00 CEST	Beljo 6'; Lisica 10'	Report	Christiansen 26'; Tripić 39'	Stadium: Stadion Maksimir; Attendance: 17,342; Referee: Serdar Gözübüyük (Netherlands)

26 August 2026 Second leg	Viking (Norway)	3–1 (5–3 agg.)	(Croatia) Dinamo Zagreb	Stavanger, Norway
21:00 CEST	Tripić 18' (pen.); Austbø 48'; Moi 50'	Report	Hoxha 10'	Stadium: Viking Stadion; Attendance: 15,152; Referee: José María Sánchez Martínez (Spain)

==== League phase ====
The league phase draw was held on 27 August 2026.

Pos	Team	Pld	W	D	L	GF	GA	GD	Pts	Qualification
20	(Italy) Roma	4	1	1	2	10	8	+2	4	Advance to knockout phase play-offs (unseeded)
21	(Ukraine) Shakhtar Donetsk	4	1	1	2	4	4	0	4	Advance to knockout phase play-offs (unseeded)
22	(Norway) Viking	4	1	1	2	9	10	−1	4	Advance to knockout phase play-offs (unseeded)
23	(Spain) Atlético Madrid	4	1	1	2	4	5	−1	4	Advance to knockout phase play-offs (unseeded)
24	(Netherlands) PSV Eindhoven	4	1	1	2	3	4	−1	4	Advance to knockout phase play-offs (unseeded)

Updated to match(es) played on 4 November 2026. Source: UEFA
Rules for classification: League phase tiebreakers

9 September 2026 1	VfB Stuttgart (Germany)	3–1	(Norway) Viking	Stuttgart, Germany
18:45 CEST	Demirović 20', 26', 32'	Report	Tripić 22'	Stadium: MHPArena; Attendance: 57,500; Referee: Nenad Minaković (Serbia)

13 October 2026 2	Viking (Norway)	3–3	(Germany) Bayern Munich	Stavanger, Norway
21:00 CEST	Stensness 2'; Christiansen 38'; H. Haugen 90'	Report	Kane 54' (pen.), 60'; Díaz 71'	Stadium: Viking Stadion; Attendance: 15,466; Referee: Georgi Kabakov (Bulgaria)

21 October 2026 3	Aston Villa (England)	3–1	(Norway) Viking	Birmingham, England
21:00 CEST	Barkley 23'; Buendía 37' (pen.); Heggheim 62' (o.g.)	Report	Christiansen 84'	Stadium: Villa Park; Attendance: 33,410; Referee: Sebastian Gishamer (Austria)

4 November 2026 4	Viking (Norway)	4–1	(Azerbaijan) Sabah	Stavanger, Norway
21:00 CET	Botheim 27', 90+4'; Tripić 69'; Falchener 81'	Report	Mbina 11'	Stadium: Viking Stadion; Attendance: 15,012; Referee: Sander van der Eijk (Netherlands)

25 November 2026 5	Atlético Madrid (Spain)	v	(Norway) Viking	Madrid, Spain
21:00 CET		Report		Stadium: Metropolitano Stadium

8 December 2026 6	Viking (Norway)	v	(Netherlands) Feyenoord	Stavanger, Norway
18:45 CET		Report		Stadium: Viking Stadion

20 January 2027 7	Viking (Norway)	v	(Netherlands) PSV Eindhoven	Stavanger, Norway
21:00 CET		Report		Stadium: Viking Stadion

27 January 2027 8	Napoli (Italy)	v	(Norway) Viking	Naples, Italy
21:00 CET		Report		Stadium: Stadio Diego Armando Maradona

== Squad statistics ==
=== Appearances and goals ===
As of match played 21 November 2026

No.	Pos	Nat	Player	Total		Eliteserien		2025–26 Cup		2026–27 Cup		Champions League	
No.	Pos	Nat	Player	Apps	Goals	Apps	Goals	Apps	Goals	Apps	Goals	Apps	Goals
1	GK	(Norway) NOR	Arild Østbø	23	0	16	0	1	0	0	0	6	0
2	DF	(Norway) NOR	Herman Haugen	32	3	22	0	2	1	2	1	6	1
3	DF	(Norway) NOR	Viljar Vevatne	10	0	6	0	0	0	2	0	2	0
5	DF	(Norway) NOR	Henrik Heggheim	34	7	26	7	2	0	0	0	6	0
6	DF	(Australia) AUS	Gianni Stensness	31	5	25	4	0	0	0	0	6	1
7	MF	(Norway) NOR	Kristoffer Askildsen	32	5	23	5	2	0	1	0	6	0
8	MF	(New Zealand) NZL	Joe Bell	28	0	21	0	1	0	1	0	5	0
10	FW	(Norway) NOR	Zlatko Tripić	34	12	25	7	2	0	1	1	6	4
11	FW	(Iceland) ISL	Hilmir Rafn Mikaelsson	5	1	3	0	2	1	0	0	0	0
11	FW	(Netherlands) NED	Romano Postema	10	0	7	0	0	0	2	0	1	0
14	FW	(Norway) NOR	Veton Berisha	1	0	1	0	0	0	0	0	0	0
15	MF	(Norway) NOR	Ola Visted	15	1	12	0	2	1	1	0	0	0
16	MF	(Norway) NOR	Ruben Alte	5	1	4	0	1	1	0	0	0	0
16	MF	(Norway) NOR	Henrik Bjørdal	14	3	9	3	0	0	1	0	4	0
17	FW	(Norway) NOR	Edvin Austbø	13	3	11	2	0	0	0	0	2	1
17	DF	(Netherlands) NED	Essiën Bassey	2	0	0	0	0	0	1	0	1	0
18	DF	(Norway) NOR	Sondre Bjørshol	15	1	12	1	1	0	0	0	2	0
19	FW	(Iceland) ISL	Amin Cosic	9	0	7	0	0	0	1	0	1	0
20	FW	(Denmark) DEN	Peter Christiansen	34	24	26	19	1	0	1	2	6	3
21	DF	(Denmark) DEN	Anders Bærtelsen	13	0	11	0	2	0	0	0	0	0
22	DF	(Norway) NOR	Rasmus Gjelsvik Steigen	1	0	0	0	0	0	1	0	0	0
22	FW	(Norway) NOR	Erik Botheim	13	6	9	4	0	0	0	0	4	2
23	FW	(Norway) NOR	Niklas Fuglestad	24	4	20	4	2	0	1	0	1	0
24	DF	(Norway) NOR	Vetle Auklend	23	0	18	0	2	0	0	0	3	0
25	DF	(Norway) NOR	Henrik Falchener	27	3	20	2	2	0	0	0	5	1
26	MF	(Norway) NOR	Simen Kvia-Egeskog	36	9	27	9	2	0	1	0	6	0
27	DF	(Norway) NOR	Jesper Daland	11	0	6	0	0	0	1	0	4	0
28	DF	(Norway) NOR	Kristoffer Haugen	25	4	19	4	0	0	1	0	5	0
29	MF	(Norway) NOR	Tobias Moi	28	1	20	0	2	0	0	0	6	1
30	GK	(Slovakia) SVK	Ľubomír Belko	14	0	11	0	1	0	2	0	0	0
31	MF	(Norway) NOR	Jacob Middelthon	1	0	0	0	0	0	1	0	0	0
32	DF	(Norway) NOR	Jonathan Røksund Debes	2	0	0	0	0	0	2	0	0	0
33	MF	(Norway) NOR	Jakob Segadal Hansen	17	2	12	0	2	0	1	2	2	0
38	DF	(Norway) NOR	Fillip Voster Botnen	1	0	1	0	0	0	0	0	0	0
42	FW	(Ghana) GHA	Kelvin Frimpong	1	0	0	0	0	0	1	0	0	0
51	DF	(Norway) NOR	Christopher Salvesen-Svenning	2	0	0	0	0	0	2	0	0	0
52	MF	(Norway) NOR	Henrik Kvelvane	1	0	0	0	0	0	1	0	0	0
54	MF	(Norway) NOR	Elias Dahman	1	0	0	0	0	0	1	0	0	0
56	MF	(Norway) NOR	Sondre Tveiten	1	0	0	0	0	0	1	0	0	0
57	DF	(Norway) NOR	Mats Sekse Johannesen	1	0	0	0	0	0	1	0	0	0
