= Jakob Segadal Hansen =

Norwegian footballer (born 2005)

Jakob Hansen
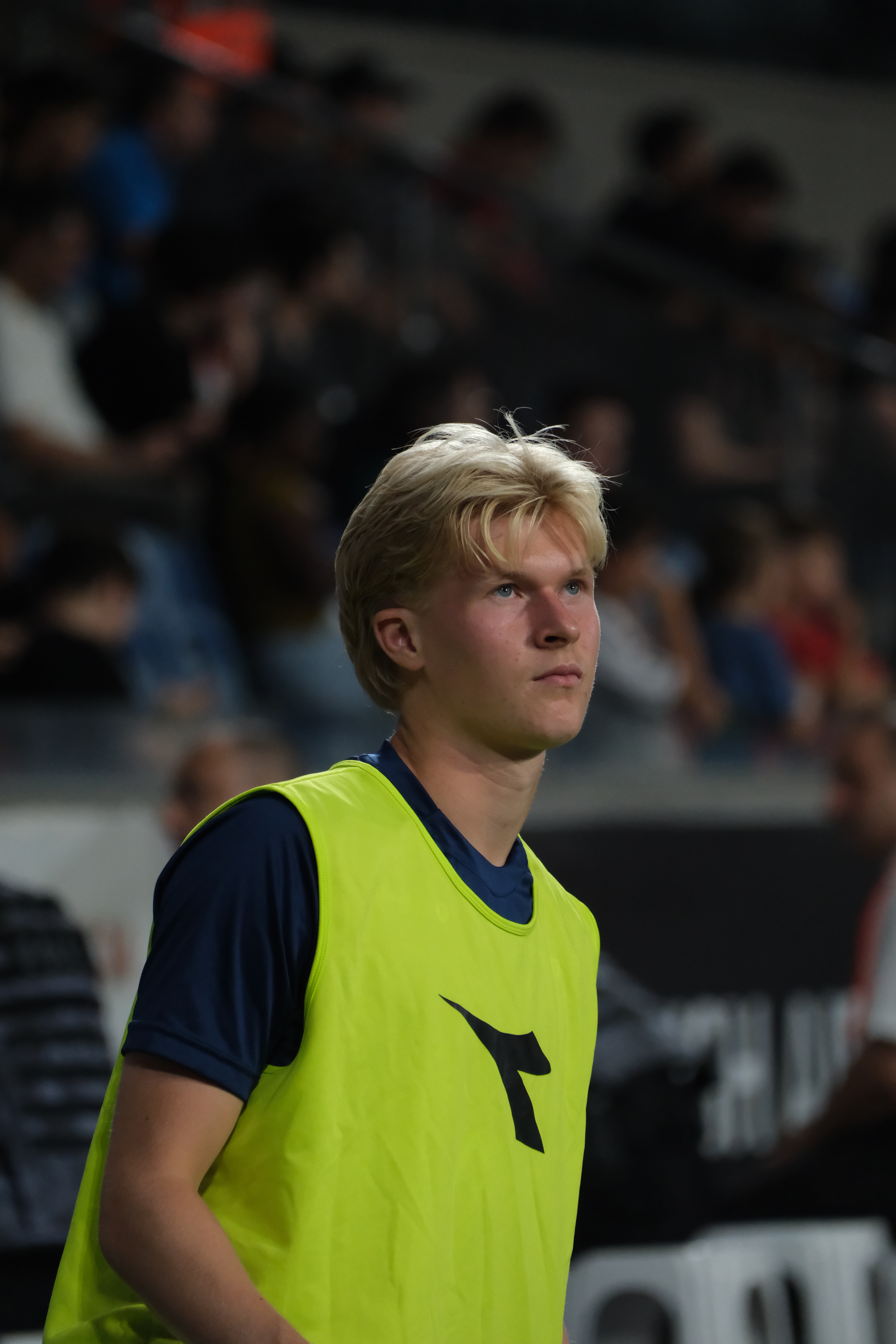
- Segadal Hansen with Viking in 2025

Personal information
- Full name: Jakob Segadal Hansen
- Date of birth: 16 June 2005 (age 21)
- Place of birth: Stavanger, Norway
- Position: Midfielder

Team information
- Current team: Viking
- Number: 33

Youth career
- –2021: Vidar
- 2024: Viking

Senior career*
Years	Team	Apps	(Gls)
2021–2023	Vidar	48	(9)
2024–	Viking	34	(2)

International career^{‡}
2025–	Norway U20	4	(1)
2025–	Norway U21	8	(0)
- * Club domestic league appearances and goals as of 09:43, 15 July 2026 (UTC) ‡ National team caps and goals as of 14 November 2026

Jakob Segadal Hansen (born 16 June 2005) is a Norwegian footballer who plays as a midfielder for Viking FK.

== Career ==
A son of Viking FK player Frode Hansen, Jakob Segadal Hansen never played for Viking's academy or youth national teams. Instead, he moved up through the youth teams of local Stavanger club FK Vidar where he made his senior debut in 2021. He eventually impressed for the fourth-tier team. In February 2024 Hansen was signed by Viking.

He made his Viking debut in the 2024 cup against Varhaug, followed by his Eliteserien debut in July against Kristiansund.

He made his breakthrough in 2025, playing for Norway U20 and starting Eliteserien matches. His first Eliteserien goal came against Rosenborg in the summer, followed by a decisive goal in the next match versus Strømsgodset, helping Viking secure the lead in the table.

== Career statistics ==
As of match played 12 July 2026

Appearances and goals by club, season and competition
Club	Season	League			National cup (Note: Includes Norwegian Cup)		Continental		Total	
Club	Season	Division	Apps	Goals	Apps	Goals	Apps	Goals	Apps	Goals
Vidar	2021	3. divisjon	1	0	0	0	—		1	0
Vidar	2022	3. divisjon	21	3	2	0	—		23	3
Vidar	2023	3. divisjon	26	6	2	0	—		28	6
Vidar	Total		48	9	4	0	—		52	9
Viking	2024	Eliteserien	2	0	1	0	—		3	0
Viking	2025	Eliteserien	25	2	6	1	3 (Note: Appearances in UEFA Conference League)	0	34	3
Viking	2026	Eliteserien	7	0	3	0	0	0	10	0
Viking	Total		34	2	10	1	3	0	47	3
Career total			82	11	14	1	3	0	99	12

== Honours ==
Viking

- Eliteserien: 2025
