= 2024 Viking FK season =

Viking FK 2024 football season

Viking
2024 season
- Chair: Jan Henrik Jelsa
- Manager(s): Bjarte Lunde Aarsheim; Morten Jensen
- Stadium: Viking Stadion
- Eliteserien: 3rd
- Norwegian Cup: Fourth round
- Top goalscorer: League: Lars-Jørgen Salvesen (12 goals); All: Lars-Jørgen Salvesen (17 goals)
- Highest home attendance: 15,900 vs Brann (14 April)
- Lowest home attendance: 10,024 vs HamKam (26 May)
- Average home league attendance: 12,364
Home colours	Away colours

The 2024 season was Viking's 6th consecutive year in the Eliteserien, and their 74th season in the top flight of Norwegian football. The club participated in the Eliteserien and the Norwegian Cup. It was the club's fourth season with Bjarte Lunde Aarsheim and Morten Jensen as managers.

== Transfers ==
=== Transfers in ===
Date	Pos.	Name	From	Fee	Ref.
6 February 2024	MF	(Norway) Jakob Segadal Hansen	Vidar	Undisclosed	
7 February 2024	DF	(Australia) Franco Lino	(Australia) Melbourne Victory	Undisclosed	
18 March 2024	FW	(Denmark) Peter Christiansen	(Denmark) Sønderjyske	Undisclosed	
17 July 2024	MF	(Sweden) Hampus Finndell	(Sweden) Djurgården	Undisclosed	
13 August 2024	MF	(United States) Christian Cappis	(Denmark) Brøndby	Undisclosed	
30 August 2024	DF	(Norway) Henrik Heggheim	(Denmark) Brøndby	Undisclosed	

=== Transfers out ===
Date	Pos.	Name	To	Fee	Ref.
31 December 2023 (Note: Contract expired 31 December 2023. Joined Eupen on 1 February 2024.)	DF	(Indonesia) Shayne Pattynama	(Belgium) Eupen	Free transfer	
9 January 2024	MF	(Norway) Markus Solbakken	(Czech Republic) Sparta Prague	Undisclosed	
12 January 2024	FW	(Guinea) Maï Traoré	Fredrikstad	Undisclosed	
5 February 2024	MF	(Norway) Lars Erik Sødal	Bryne	Undisclosed	
8 February 2024	DF	(Slovenia) David Brekalo	(United States) Orlando City	Undisclosed	
8 July 2024	FW	(Norway) Jesper Fiksdal	Skeid	Undisclosed	
16 July 2024	GK	(Iceland) Patrik Gunnarsson	(Belgium) K.V. Kortrijk	Undisclosed	
22 July 2024	MF	(Australia) Patrick Yazbek	(United States) Nashville SC	Undisclosed	
10 August 2024	MF	(Norway) Sondre Auklend	Bodø/Glimt	Undisclosed	
16 August 2024	MF	(Norway) Harald Nilsen Tangen	Sarpsborg 08	Undisclosed	
12 September 2024	DF	(Senegal) Djibril Diop	(Switzerland) Yverdon-Sport	Undisclosed	
26 September 2024	DF	(Norway) Jone Berg	Retired		

=== Loans in ===
Start date	Pos.	Name	From	End date	Ref.
22 October 2024	GK	(Norway) Jacob Storevik	Vålerenga	End of season	

=== Loans out ===
Start date	Pos.	Name	To	End date	Ref.
30 March 2024	GK	(Norway) Magnus Rugland Ree	Egersund	9 April 2024	
6 August 2024	DF	(Norway) Kristoffer Forgaard Paulsen	Sogndal	End of season	
10 September 2024	FW	(Norway) Jørgen Galta	Egersund	End of season	

== Competitions ==
=== Eliteserien ===
==== Table ====
Pos	Team	Pld	W	D	L	GF	GA	GD	Pts	Qualification or relegation
1	Bodø/Glimt (C)	30	18	8	4	71	31	+40	62	Qualification for the Champions League play-off round
2	Brann	30	17	8	5	55	33	+22	59	Qualification for the Champions League second qualifying round
3	Viking	30	16	9	5	61	39	+22	57	Qualification for the Conference League second qualifying round
4	Rosenborg	30	16	5	9	52	39	+13	53	Qualification for the Conference League second qualifying round
5	Molde	30	15	7	8	64	36	+28	52	

Source: Football Association of Norway (in Norwegian)
Rules for classification: 1) Points; 2) Goal difference; 3) Goals scored; 4) Head-to-head points; 5) Head-to-head goal difference; 6) Head-to-head goals scored.
(C) Champions

==== Results summary ====
Overall								Home						Away					
Pld	W	D	L	GF	GA	GD	Pts	W	D	L	GF	GA	GD	W	D	L	GF	GA	GD
30	16	9	5	61	39	+22	57	10	4	1	34	18	+16	6	5	4	27	21	+6

Source: see below

==== Results by round ====
Round	1	2	3	4	5	6	7	8	9	10	11	12	13	14	15	16	17	18	19	20	21	22	23	24	25	26	27	28	29	30
Ground	H	A	H	H	A	H	A	H	A	H	A	H	A	H	A	H	A	H	A	H	A	H	A	A	H	A	H	A	H	A
Result	W	L	D	D	D	W	W	L	W	W	D	W	W	W	L	W	D	D	L	W	D	W	L	W	D	W	W	W	W	D
Position	7	9	9	11	9	6	5	6	5	5	5	4	4	3	4	2	2	2	4	4	4	3	4	4	4	4	3	3	3	3

Source: NIFS
A = Away; H = Home; W = Win; D = Draw; L = Loss

==== Matches ====
The league fixtures were announced on 20 December 2023.

1 April 2024 1	Viking	1–0	Sarpsborg 08	Stavanger
19:15 CEST	S. Christiansen 43' (o.g.)	Report		Stadium: Viking Stadion; Attendance: 12,521; Referee: Kristoffer Hagenes

6 April 2024 2	Bodø/Glimt	1–0	Viking	Bodø
18:00 CEST	Saltnes 83'	Report		Stadium: Aspmyra Stadion; Attendance: 6,584; Referee: Espen Eskås

14 April 2024 3	Viking	1–1	Brann	Stavanger
14:30 CEST	Salvesen 22'	Report	Blomberg 71'	Stadium: Viking Stadion; Attendance: 15,900; Referee: Tore Hansen

21 April 2024 4	Viking	1–1	Fredrikstad	Stavanger
17:00 CEST	D'Agostino 33'	Report	Bjørlo 8'	Stadium: Viking Stadion; Attendance: 15,009; Referee: Marius Hansen Grøtta

28 April 2024 5	Odd	3–3	Viking	Skien
19:15 CEST	Svendsen 30', 35'; Ingebrigtsen 90+7'	Report	Tangen 25'; P. Christiansen 87'; Tripić 90+4'	Stadium: Skagerak Arena; Attendance: 4,337; Referee: Sigurd Smehus Kringstad

5 May 2024 6	Viking	2–1	Tromsø	Stavanger
19:15 CEST	Salvesen 52'; Tripić 90+6' (pen.)	Report	R. Y. Jenssen 54'	Stadium: Viking Stadion; Attendance: 10,093; Referee: Rohit Saggi

12 May 2024 7	Strømsgodset	0–1	Viking	Drammen
17:00 CEST		Report	Salvesen 53'	Stadium: Marienlyst Stadion; Attendance: 4,669; Referee: Svein Tore Sinnes

16 May 2024 8	Viking	1–4	Lillestrøm	Stavanger
18:00 CEST	Tripić 68' (pen.)	Report	Olsen 5' (pen.); Åsen 8'; Kitolano 38'; Knudtzon 90+1'	Stadium: Viking Stadion; Attendance: 15,800; Referee: Sivert Amland

20 May 2024 9	Sandefjord	0–3	Viking	Sandefjord
17:00 CEST		Report	Tripić 4'; Salvesen 54'; Kvia-Egeskog 70'	Stadium: Jotun Arena; Attendance: 3,696; Referee: Mathias Støfringshaug

26 May 2024 10	Viking	3–0	HamKam	Stavanger
17:00 CEST	Auklend 16', 77'; Kvia-Egeskog 45+3'	Report		Stadium: Viking Stadion; Attendance: 10,024; Referee: Sigurd Kringstad

2 June 2024 11	Molde	2–2	Viking	Molde
14:30 CEST	Gulbrandsen 7'; Eriksen 74'	Report	Amundsen 20' (o.g.); McDermott 46' (o.g.)	Stadium: Aker Stadion; Attendance: 6,879; Referee: Tore Hansen

30 June 2024 12	Viking	4–2	Rosenborg	Stavanger
15:00 CEST (UTC+2)	Tripić 19' (pen.), 73'; Bjørshol 69'; P. Christiansen 84'	Report	Tagseth 48'; Sæter 90+4' (pen.)	Stadium: Viking Stadion; Attendance: 11,512; Referee: Ola Hobber Nilsen

7 July 2024 13	KFUM Oslo	1–2	Viking	Oslo
17:00 CEST	Nosa Dahl 22'	Report	Svendsen 81'; Tangen 85'	Stadium: KFUM Arena; Attendance: 2,807; Referee: Marius Hansen Grøtta

13 July 2024 14	Viking	2–0	Kristiansund	Stavanger
17:00 CEST	Svendsen 46', 67'	Report		Stadium: Viking Stadion; Attendance: 10,126; Referee: Svein Tore Sinnes

21 July 2024 15	Haugesund	1–0	Viking	Haugesund
17:00 CEST	Tounekti 47'	Report		Stadium: Haugesund Stadion; Attendance: 6,828; Referee: Tore Hansen

28 July 2024 16	Viking	1–0	Molde	Stavanger
19:15 CEST	Bjørshol 47'	Report		Stadium: Viking Stadion; Attendance: 10,622; Referee: Rohit Saggi

4 August 2024 17	HamKam	3–3	Viking	Hamar
17:00 CEST	Bjørshol 60' (o.g.); Langås 72' (o.g.); Bjarnason 84'	Report	Tripić 26' (pen.); Austbø 66'; Svendsen 86'	Stadium: Briskeby Stadion; Attendance: 3,504; Referee: Christian Moen

10 August 2024 18	Viking	1–1	Bodø/Glimt	Stavanger
18:00 CEST	Austbø 89'	Report	Evjen 58'	Stadium: Viking Stadion; Attendance: 14,976; Referee: Mohammed Usman Aslam

18 August 2024 19	Rosenborg	2–1	Viking	Trondheim
19:15 CEST	Jenssen 26'; Pereira 35'	Report	Svendsen 79'	Stadium: Lerkendal Stadion; Attendance: 12,218; Referee: Espen Eskås

25 August 2024 20	Viking	5–2	Strømsgodset	Stavanger
17:00 CEST	Tripić 6', 36' (pen.); Salvesen 58'; Svendsen 61'; Stensness 82'	Report	Melkersen 29'; Therkelsen 74'	Stadium: Viking Stadion; Attendance: 10,211; Referee: Marius Hansen Grøtta

1 September 2024 21	Tromsø	2–2	Viking	Tromsø
17:00 CESTz	Erlien 16'; Jenssen 31'	Report	P. Christiansen 84'; Vevatne 86'	Stadium: Romssa Arena; Attendance: 4,807; Referee: Kristoffer Hagenes

14 September 2024 22	Viking	1–0	KFUM Oslo	Stavanger
16:00 CEST	Njie 39' (o.g.)	Report		Stadium: Viking Stadion; Attendance: 10,099; Referee: Mohammad Usman Aslam

22 September 2024 23	Fredrikstad	3–2	Viking	Fredrikstad
19:15 CEST	Fall 14'; Molde 42'; Sørløkk 55'	Report	Kvia-Egeskog 79'; Salvesen 84'	Stadium: Fredrikstad Stadion; Attendance: 6,171; Referee: Ola Hobber Nilsen

29 September 2024 24	Lillestrøm	1–4	Viking	Lillestrøm
17:00 CEST	Vá 68'	Report	Christiansen 45+1', 66'; Heggheim 46'; Svendsen 59'	Stadium: Åråsen Stadion; Attendance: 6,478; Referee: Svein Tore Sinnes

20 October 2024 25	Viking	3–3	Odd	Stavanger
17:00 CEST	Heggheim 35'; Salvesen 79'; D'Agostino 90+5'	Report	Ree 15' (o.g.); Sinyan 18'; Njie 90'	Stadium: Viking Stadion; Attendance: 13,244; Referee: Marius Hansen Grøtta

27 October 2024 26	Sarpsborg 08	1–2	Viking	Sarpsborg
17:00 CET	Halvorsen 21'	Report	Salvesen 43'; Stensness 70'	Stadium: Sarpsborg Stadion; Attendance: 4,793; Referee: Kristoffer Hagenes

2 November 2024 27	Viking	3–2	Sandefjord	Stavanger
18:00 CET	Salvesen 27', 43', 65'	Report	Dunsby 7'; Mettler 24'	Stadium: Viking Stadion; Attendance: 10,627; Referee: Espen Eskås

10 November 2024 28	Kristiansund	0–1	Viking	Kristiansund
17:00 CET		Report	Tripić 12'	Stadium: Kristiansund Stadion; Attendance: 3,395; Referee: Tore Hansen

23 November 2024 29	Viking	5–1	Haugesund	Stavanger
17:00 CET	Langås 40'; D'Agostino 55', 59'; Salvesen 73'; Løkberg 90'	Report	Storevik 7' (o.g.)	Stadium: Viking Stadion; Attendance: 14,701; Referee: Kristoffer Hagenes

1 December 2024 30	Brann	1–1	Viking	Bergen
17:00 CET	Castro 76' (pen.)	Report	Christiansen 55'	Stadium: Brann Stadion; Attendance: 16,500; Referee: Rohit Saggi

=== Norwegian Cup ===
10 April 2024 First round	Varhaug	0–5	Viking	Varhaug
18:00 CEST		Report	Paulsen 7'; D'Agostino 12' de Lanlay 50'; Løkberg 53'; Christiansen 55'	Stadium: Varhaug Stadion; Attendance: 1,602; Referee: Amir Ajjour

24 April 2024 Second round	Torvastad	3–4	Viking	Torvastad
18:00 CEST	Grønningen 45+1'; Lippestad 49'; Miljeteig 53'	Report	Salvesen 7', 16', 87' (pen.); Kvia-Egeskog 75'	Stadium: Torvastad idrettssenter Attendance: 2,000; Referee: Freek van Herk

1 May 2024 Third round	Tromsdalen	0–4	Viking	Tromsø
16:00 CEST		Report	Svendsen 17'; Christiansen 57'; Salvesen 70', 83'	Stadium: TUIL Arena; Attendance: 1,504; Referee: Magnus Nicolai Koløy

8 May 2024 Fourth round	Levanger	4–2 (a.e.t.)	Viking	Levanger
19:05 CEST	Gunnes 1'; Bojadzic 50' (pen.); Lorentsen 96'; Bruseth 108'	Report	Christiansen 16'; Kvia-Egeskog 76'	Stadium: Moan Fritidspark; Attendance: 2,003; Referee: Marius Lien

== Squad statistics ==
=== Appearances and goals ===
As of match played 1 December 2024

No.	Pos	Nat	Player	Total		Eliteserien		Norwegian Cup	
No.	Pos	Nat	Player	Apps	Goals	Apps	Goals	Apps	Goals
1	GK	(Norway) NOR	Arild Østbø	11	0	7	0	4	0
2	DF	(Norway) NOR	Herman Haugen	22	0	21	0	1	0
3	DF	(Norway) NOR	Viljar Vevatne	28	1	24	1	4	0
4	DF	(Norway) NOR	Sondre Langås	33	1	30	1	3	0
5	DF	(Senegal) SEN	Djibril Diop	13	0	11	0	2	0
6	DF	(Australia) AUS	Gianni Stensness	28	2	25	2	3	0
7	FW	(Australia) AUS	Nicholas D'Agostino	18	5	17	4	1	1
8	MF	(New Zealand) NZL	Joe Bell	31	0	28	0	3	0
9	FW	(Norway) NOR	Lars-Jørgen Salvesen	30	17	27	12	3	5
10	FW	(Norway) NOR	Zlatko Tripić	29	10	28	10	1	0
11	MF	(Norway) NOR	Yann-Erik de Lanlay	24	1	20	0	4	1
12	GK	(Norway) NOR	Magnus Rugland Ree	4	0	4	0	0	0
13	MF	(Sweden) SWE	Hampus Finndell	11	0	11	0	0	0
14	MF	(Australia) AUS	Patrick Yazbek	15	0	13	0	2	0
15	DF	(Norway) NOR	Henrik Heggheim	8	2	8	2	0	0
16	MF	(Norway) NOR	Kristoffer Løkberg	6	2	5	1	1	1
17	FW	(Norway) NOR	Edvin Austbø	9	2	9	2	0	0
18	DF	(Norway) NOR	Sondre Bjørshol	14	2	14	2	0	0
19	MF	(Norway) NOR	Sondre Auklend	15	2	11	2	4	0
20	FW	(Denmark) DEN	Peter Christiansen	32	9	28	6	4	3
21	MF	(Norway) NOR	Harald Nilsen Tangen	15	2	13	2	2	0
22	DF	(Australia) AUS	Franco Lino	1	0	0	0	1	0
23	DF	(Slovenia) SVN	Jošt Urbančič	26	0	24	0	2	0
24	DF	(Norway) NOR	Vetle Auklend	9	0	5	0	4	0
26	MF	(Norway) NOR	Simen Kvia-Egeskog	28	5	24	3	4	2
27	MF	(United States) USA	Christian Cappis	12	0	12	0	0	0
29	FW	(Norway) NOR	Sander Svendsen	30	8	27	7	3	1
30	GK	(Iceland) ISL	Patrik Gunnarsson	14	0	14	0	0	0
30	GK	(Norway) NOR	Jacob Storevik	5	0	5	0	0	0
31	MF	(Norway) NOR	Niklas Fuglestad	7	0	7	0	0	0
32	MF	(Norway) NOR	Kasper Sætherbø	4	0	2	0	2	0
33	FW	(Norway) NOR	Jesper Fiksdal	1	0	0	0	1	0
33	MF	(Norway) NOR	Jakob Segadal Hansen	3	0	2	0	1	0
34	DF	(Norway) NOR	Kristoffer Forgaard Paulsen	3	1	1	0	2	1
35	MF	(Norway) NOR	Ola Visted	1	0	0	0	1	0
35	DF	(Norway) NOR	Tobias Moi	2	0	1	0	1	0
41	MF	(Norway) NOR	Felix Taraldset	1	0	0	0	1	0
