= Gianni Stensness =

Australian soccer player (born 1999)

- Stensness playing for Central Coast Mariners in 2020

Personal information
- Full name: Gianni Ryan Stensness
- Date of birth: 7 February 1999 (age 27)
- Place of birth: Brisbane, Queensland, Australia
- Height: 1.86 m (6 ft 1 in)
- Positions: Defensive midfielder; centre-back

Team information
- Current team: Viking
- Number: 6

Youth career
- Pittwater RSL
- Collaroy Cromer Strikers
- 2016–2017: North Shore Mariners
- 2017: Central Coast Mariners

Senior career*
| Years | Team | Apps | (Gls) |
| 2016 | North Shore Mariners | 10 | (0) |
| 2017 | CCM Academy | 26 | (2) |
| 2018 | Manly United | 7 | (0) |
| 2018–2019 | Wellington Phoenix Reserves | 12 | (1) |
| 2019 | Wellington Phoenix | 4 | (0) |
| 2019–2021 | Central Coast Mariners | 48 | (1) |
| 2021– | Viking | 84 | (7) |
| 2021–2025 | Viking 2 | 5 | (0) |

International career^{‡}
| 2017 | Australia U20 | 1 | (0) |
| 2019 | New Zealand U20 | 4 | (1) |
| 2019–2021 | New Zealand U23 | 13 | (0) |
| 2022– | Australia | 3 | (0) |
- * Club domestic league appearances and goals as of 23 July 2026 ‡ National team caps and goals as of 21 November 2026

Gianni Ryan Stensness (born 7 February 1999) is an Australian professional soccer player who plays as a centre-back for Norwegian Eliteserien club Viking. A former youth international for New Zealand, Stensness plays for the Australia national team.

== Club career ==
=== Wellington Phoenix ===
In March 2019, Stensness was promoted to the Wellington Phoenix first team from their reserves. On 9 March 2019, he played his first professional game for the club. He came on as a substitute for Mandi in an 8–2 win over his former side, Central Coast Mariners. In June 2019, he left Wellington Phoenix to explore opportunities in Europe.

=== Central Coast Mariners ===
Stensness returned from Europe and was offered a contract with Wellington Phoenix, but decided to sign a one-year contract with Central Coast Mariners in August 2019 as a midfielder. After a strong start to the 2019–20 season, Stensness signed a two-year extension on his contract, through to 2022. His performances in the 2019–20 season earned him the CCM Goal of the Year and Newcomer of the Year awards. Stensness also had the most tackles in the A-League in the 2019–20 season and gained the highest OPTA score of any player in the team. Stensness showed himself to be one of the strongest and most commanding defensive midfielders in the A-League in season 20/21.

=== Viking FK ===
On 9 August 2021, he signed a three-year contract with Norwegian club Viking FK. He made his debut for the club on 29 August 2021, in a 2–1 win against Rosenborg. Stensness made six appearances as Viking won the 2025 Eliteserien.

== International career ==
Eligible for both Australia and New Zealand (Australia via birth, New Zealand via paternal birth), 17-year old Stensness was named by Ufuk Talay in an Australian under-20 national team training camp on 31 January 2017. In August 2017, Stensness was part of the under-20 team who played in a Tri Series against the Western Australia state team and against the Singapore national under-19 football team.

On 11 February 2019, Stensness was invited by New Zealand under-20 national team coach Des Buckingham to a talent identification camp in Auckland. On 23 March 2019 he declared his desire to represent New Zealand.

On 28 May 2019, Stensness scored his first goal for New Zealand at the U-20 World Cup against Norway, helping his team advance to the round of 16.

In September 2021, Stensness decided to represent Australia internationally. He debuted with Australia in a 2–0 2022 FIFA World Cup qualification loss to Japan on 24 March 2022.

== Career statistics ==
As of match played 21 November 2026

Appearances and goals by club, season and competition
| Club | Season | League | | | Cup (Note: Includes Australia Cup, Norwegian Football Cup) | | Continental | | Total | |
| Club | Season | Division | Apps | Goals | Apps | Goals | Apps | Goals | Apps | Goals |
|---|---|---|---|---|---|---|---|---|---|---|
| North Shore Mariners | 2016 | NPL NSW 2 | 10 | 0 | 0 | 0 | — | | 10 | 0 |
| Central Coast Mariners Academy | 2017 | NPL NSW 2 | 26 | 2 | — | | — | | 26 | 2 |
| Manly United | 2018 | NPL NSW | 7 | 0 | 1 | 0 | — | | 8 | 0 |
| Wellington Phoenix Reserves | 2018–19 | NZFC | 12 | 1 | — | | — | | 12 | 1 |
| Wellington Phoenix | 2018–19 | A-League | 4 | 0 | 0 | 0 | — | | 4 | 0 |
| Central Coast Mariners | 2019–20 | A-League | 25 | 1 | 2 | 0 | — | | 27 | 1 |
| Central Coast Mariners | 2020–21 | A-League | 23 | 0 | 0 | 0 | — | | 23 | 0 |
| Central Coast Mariners | Total | | 48 | 1 | 2 | 0 | — | | 50 | 1 |
| Viking | 2021 | Eliteserien | 14 | 1 | 1 | 0 | — | | 15 | 1 |
| Viking | 2022 | Eliteserien | 18 | 0 | 4 | 0 | 0 | 0 | 22 | 0 |
| Viking | 2023 | Eliteserien | 9 | 1 | 3 | 1 | — | | 12 | 2 |
| Viking | 2024 | Eliteserien | 25 | 2 | 3 | 0 | — | | 28 | 2 |
| Viking | 2025 | Eliteserien | 6 | 0 | 1 | 0 | — | | 7 | 0 |
| Viking | 2026 | Eliteserien | 24 | 4 | 0 | 0 | 6 (Note: Appearances in UEFA Champions League) | 1 | 30 | 5 |
| Viking | Total | | 96 | 8 | 12 | 1 | 6 | 1 | 114 | 10 |
| Viking 2 | 2021 | Norwegian Third Division | 1 | 0 | — | | — | | 1 | 0 |
| Viking 2 | 2024 | Norwegian Second Division | 1 | 0 | — | | — | | 1 | 0 |
| Viking 2 | 2025 | Norwegian Third Division | 3 | 0 | — | | — | | 3 | 0 |
| Viking 2 | Total | | 5 | 0 | 0 | 0 | 0 | 0 | 5 | 0 |
| Career total | | | 208 | 12 | 15 | 1 | 6 | 1 | 229 | 14 |

== Honours ==
Viking

- Eliteserien: 2025
