= Henrik Heggheim =

Norwegian footballer (born 2001)

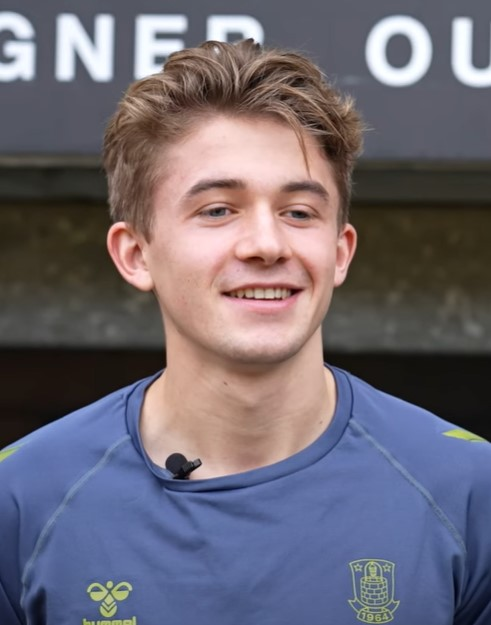
- Heggheim in 2021

Personal information
- Date of birth: 22 April 2001 (age 25)
- Place of birth: Stavanger, Norway
- Height: 1.89 m (6 ft 2 in)
- Position: Centre-back

Team information
- Current team: Viking
- Number: 5

Youth career
- 2006–2020: Viking

Senior career*
Years	Team	Apps	(Gls)
2020–2021	Viking	43	(0)
2021–2024	Brøndby	29	(1)
2023	→ Vålerenga (loan)	9	(0)
2024–	Viking	50	(7)

International career^{‡}
2021–2023	Norway U21	18	(0)
- * Club domestic league appearances and goals as of 23 July 2026 ‡ National team caps and goals as of 28 June 2023

Henrik Heggheim (born 22 April 2001) is a Norwegian professional footballer who plays as a centre-back for Eliteserien club Viking.

== Career ==
=== Viking ===
Growing up in the Eiganes district of Stavanger, Norway, Heggheim started playing football for the Viking FK youth academy at age 5.

On 11 June 2020, he signed a professional contract with Viking until the end of the 2021 season. Three weeks later, on 1 July 2020, he made his Eliteserien debut for the club in a 2–0 win against Sandefjord. After playing nine consecutive matches in the league, his contract was extended until the end of the 2023 season on 13 August 2020.

=== Brøndby ===
On 30 August 2021, Heggheim joined the 2020–21 Danish Superliga champions Brøndby IF on a four-year contract. He made his debut on 23 September in a 8–1 win over Allerød FK in the Danish Cup. He made his first European appearance for the club on 30 September in a 3–0 loss to Lyon in the UEFA Europa League group stage. On 24 October, he made his domestic league debut in a 2–1 win over FC Copenhagen in the Copenhagen Derby. Heggheim scored his first goal for Brøndby – as well as his first senior goal – on 28 February 2022, which proved to be the winner in a 1–0 league victory against SønderjyskE.

On 14 March 2023, Heggheim joined Vålerenga on loan until 30 June 2023. He made 12 total appearances for the club before returning to Brøndby.

=== Return to Viking ===
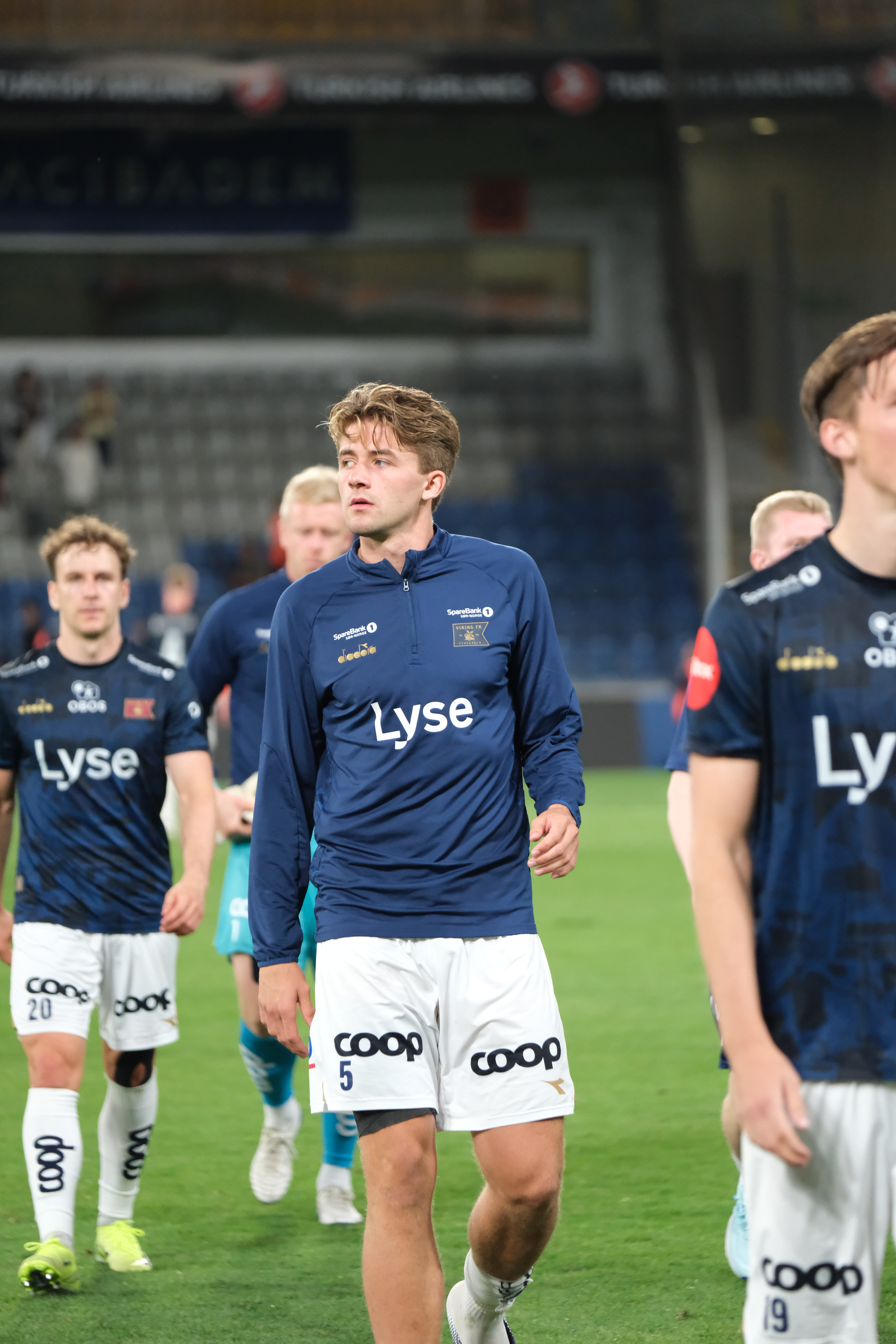
Heggheim with Viking in 2025

On 30 August 2024, Heggheim returned to Eliteserien side Viking on a four-and-a-half-year contract, describing the move as a homecoming to "his club". He made his second debut on 14 September, coming on as an 83rd-minute substitute in a 1–0 win against KFUM Oslo. On 29 September he scored his first Eliteserien goal, contributing to a 4–1 away victory over Lillestrøm at Åråsen Stadion.

Heggheim played a regular role in Viking's 2025 campaign, helping the club secure its first league title since 1991.

== Career statistics ==
As of match played 23 July 2026

Appearances and goals by club, season and competition
Club	Season	League			National cup		Europe		Other		Total	
Club	Season	Division	Apps	Goals	Apps	Goals	Apps	Goals	Apps	Goals	Apps	Goals
Viking	2020	Eliteserien	26	0	—		1 (Note: Appearance(s) in the UEFA Europa League)	0	—		27	0
Viking	2021	Eliteserien	17	0	2	0	—		—		19	0
Viking	Total		43	0	2	0	1	0	—		46	0
Brøndby	2021–22	Superliga	14	1	3	0	4	0	—		21	1
Brøndby	2022–23	Superliga	2	0	1	0	4 (Note: Appearances in the UEFA Conference League)	0	—		7	0
Brøndby	2023–24	Superliga	13	0	0	0	—		—		13	0
Brøndby	2024–25	Superliga	0	0	—		1	0	—		1	0
Brøndby	Total		29	1	4	0	9	0	—		42	1
Vålerenga (loan)	2023	Eliteserien	9	0	3	0	—		—		12	0
Viking	2024	Eliteserien	8	2	0	0	—		—		8	2
Viking	2025	Eliteserien	29	2	6	0	3	0	—		38	2
Viking	2026	Eliteserien	13	3	0	0	0	0	—		13	3
Viking	Total		50	4	7	0	3	0	—		59	7
Career total			131	8	15	0	13	0	0	0	159	8

== Honours ==
Viking

- Eliteserien: 2025
