= Edvin Austbø =

Norwegian footballer (born 2005)

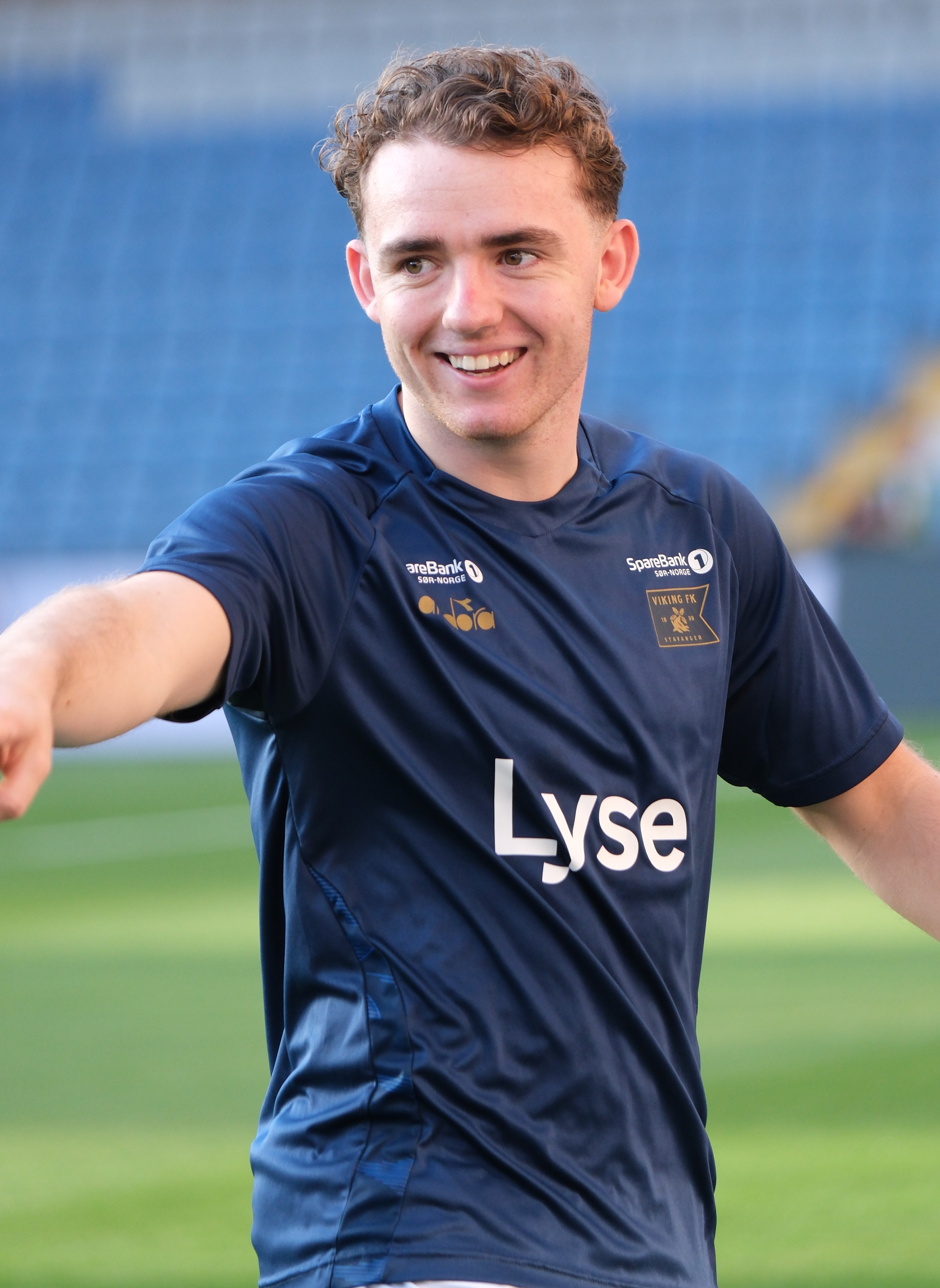
- Austbø with Viking in 2025

Personal information
- Date of birth: 1 May 2005 (age 21)
- Place of birth: Stavanger, Norway
- Height: 1.72 m (5 ft 8 in)
- Positions: Left winger; left midfielder

Team information
- Current team: West Ham United
- Number: 35

Youth career
- –2022: Viking

Senior career*
Years	Team	Apps	(Gls)
2021–2024	Viking 2	39	(13)
2022–2026	Viking	61	(11)
2023	→ Sandnes Ulf (loan)	9	(1)
2026–	West Ham United	12	(2)

International career^{‡}
2022	Norway U17	4	(0)
2023	Norway U18	10	(1)
2024	Norway U19	5	(0)
2025–	Norway U21	10	(0)
- * Club domestic league appearances and goals as of 16:50, 21 November 2026 (UTC) ‡ National team caps and goals as of 14 November 2026

Edvin Austbø (born 1 May 2005) is a Norwegian professional footballer who plays as a left winger or left midfielder for EFL Championship club West Ham United.

== Club career ==
=== Viking ===
On 19 May 2022, he made his competitive debut for Viking in a 6–1 cup win against Rosseland, scoring one of the goals. On 17 July 2022, he made his Eliteserien debut in a 2–1 win against Kristiansund.

In September 2023, Austbø was loaned to second tier side Sandnes Ulf. Austbø scored on his debut for the club on 16 September 2023, in an eventual 2–1 loss against KFUM Oslo.

Austbø was named Eliteserien Young Player of the Year as Viking won the 2025 Eliteserien.

=== West Ham United ===
On 31 August 2026, Austbø signed for EFL Championship club West Ham United on a four-year contract. Austbø scored his first goal for West Ham in a 3–0 home win against Derby County on 5 September 2026, just 10 minutes after having replaced Manor Solomon in the 77th minute of the game.

== International career ==
Austbø made four appearances for Norway's under-17s, making his debut against Poland in February 2022, before progressing to represent the under-18s, where he gained ten caps, scoring once against Germany in November 2023. Austbø was later called up to represent Norway at the 2024 UEFA European Under-19 Championship, helping the country gain qualification to the 2025 FIFA U-20 World Cup as a result. In March 2025, Austbø made his debut for Norway U21 for the first time.

== Career statistics ==
As of match played 7 November 2026

Appearances and goals by club, season and competition
Club	Season	League			National cup (Note: Norwegian Football Cup, FA Cup)		League cup (Note: EFL Cup)		Europe		Total	
Club	Season	Division	Apps	Goals	Apps	Goals	Apps	Goals	Apps	Goals	Apps	Goals
Viking 2	2021	3. divisjon	3	0	—		—		—		3	0
Viking 2	2022	3. divisjon	19	7	—		—		—		19	7
Viking 2	2023	3. divisjon	10	1	—		—		—		10	1
Viking 2	2024	2. divisjon	7	5	—		—		—		7	5
Viking 2	Total		39	13	—		—		—		39	13
Viking	2022	Eliteserien	7	1	2	1	—		2 (Note: Appearances in UEFA Conference League)	1	11	3
Viking	2023	Eliteserien	7	0	4	0	—		—		11	0
Viking	2024	Eliteserien	9	2	0	0	—		—		9	2
Viking	2025	Eliteserien	27	6	5	1	—		2	2	34	9
Viking	2026	Eliteserien	11	2	0	0	—		2 (Note: Appearances in UEFA Champions League)	1	13	3
Viking	Total		61	11	11	2	—		6	4	78	17
Sandnes Ulf (loan)	2023	1. divisjon	9	1	0	0	—		—		9	1
West Ham United	2026–27	EFL Championship	11	2	0	0	0	0	—		11	2
Career total			120	27	11	2	0	0	6	4	137	33

== Honours ==
Viking

- Eliteserien: 2025

Individual

- Eliteserien Young Player of the Month: October 2025
- Eliteserien Young Player of the Year: 2025
