= Jan Peder Jalland =

Norwegian football manager (born 1980)

Personal information
- Date of birth: 2 May 1980 (age 46)

Team information
- Current team: Norway U21 (manager)

Youth career
- Ørn-Horten

Senior career*
| Years | Team | Apps | (Gls) |
| –2001 | Borre | | |
| 2002 | Fossum | | |

Managerial career
- 2004–2006: Borre
- 2007–2008: Nesodden
- 2009–2012: Stabæk (junior team)
- 2013–2018: Stabæk (assistant)
- 2019–2023: Norway U15/U16/U17
- 2023–: Norway U21
- * Club domestic league appearances and goals

Jan Peder Jalland (born 2 May 1980) is a Norwegian football manager who currently manages the Norwegian national under-21 team. Turning to coaching at age 24, Jalland spent a decade in Stabæk before managing Norwegian national youth teams.

== Early life ==
Jalland grew up at a farm in Nykirke, as a younger brother of footballer Jørgen Jalland. Jan Peder played youth football for Ørn-Horten and Third Division football for Borre IF and from 2002 Fossum IF.

During a match for Fossum, Jalland saw double. Because of this and other ailments at the time, he booked a doctor's appointment and was sent to Tønsberg Hospital where he was diagnosed with testicular cancer. Furthermore, the cancer had spread to his stomach, lungs and spine. Throughout 2003 he underwent chemotherapy at the Norwegian Radium Hospital.

== Manager career ==
To recover, Jalland moved back to Nykirke. Here, Jalland came into contact with his old club Borre IF and was allowed to become a kit manager. However, the first-team coach had to leave, and Jalland was given a chance in the job, doing so while he was still on morphine from his cancer treatment. Jalland coached Borre from 2004 through 2006, when he was hired by Third Division club Nesodden IF. Nesodden recorded their highest-ever league placement in the 2007 Third Division, and then again in 2008, when the team ended second behind KFUM. Jalland celebrated by substituting in himself in Nesodden's last match of the 2008 season, which they won 4–1.

He was picked up by Stabæk as their U20 coach, and was concurrently employed at Nadderud Upper Secondary School which at the time had a programme for elite football. Following a successful tenure, he was promoted to assistant manager for the senior team ahead of the 2013 season. Serving under Petter Belsvik, the team faced Jørgen Jalland's Ørn Horten in the 2013 cup. Jalland continued serving under the next Stabæk managers Bob Bradley, Billy McKinlay, Toni Ordinas and Henning Berg while also working at Stabæk's affiliate school, the Norwegian School of Elite Sport.

His stint in Stabæk included short spells as caretaker manager between the mentioned managers. After Toni Ordinas was sacked in 2018, Jalland was the caretaker manager before Henning Berg was hired. Jalland managed Stabæk to a 2–1 victory against Haugesund. Jalland's goal, however, was to become an Eliteserien manager "in five or ten years" and as such he was content with continuing as Stabæk's assistant manager. In 2018 he obtained the UEFA Pro Licence.

Jalland was approached by the Football Association of Norway in December 2018, with the intent of acquiring his services as a national team manager. In early 2019 he was hired as head coach of the Norway under-15, under-16 and under-17 national teams, sharing responsibilities with Gunnar Halle. Jalland coached his first international matches in February 2019.

In May 2023 he was promoted to Norway under-21, as he would succeed Leif Gunnar Smerud after the 2023 European Under-21 Championship that summer. His first match was against San Marino U21 in September 2023, as Norway U21 embarked on the 2025 European Under-21 Championship qualification. Jalland won the first three matches in charge before losing against Italy U21.

Jalland was reported as a candidate to take over as Odds BK manager in 2024, but remained in the Football Association.

== Personal life ==
Jalland married Andrine Bærås. They had two children and reside in Bærum.
