= Simen Kvia-Egeskog =

Norwegian footballer (born 2003)

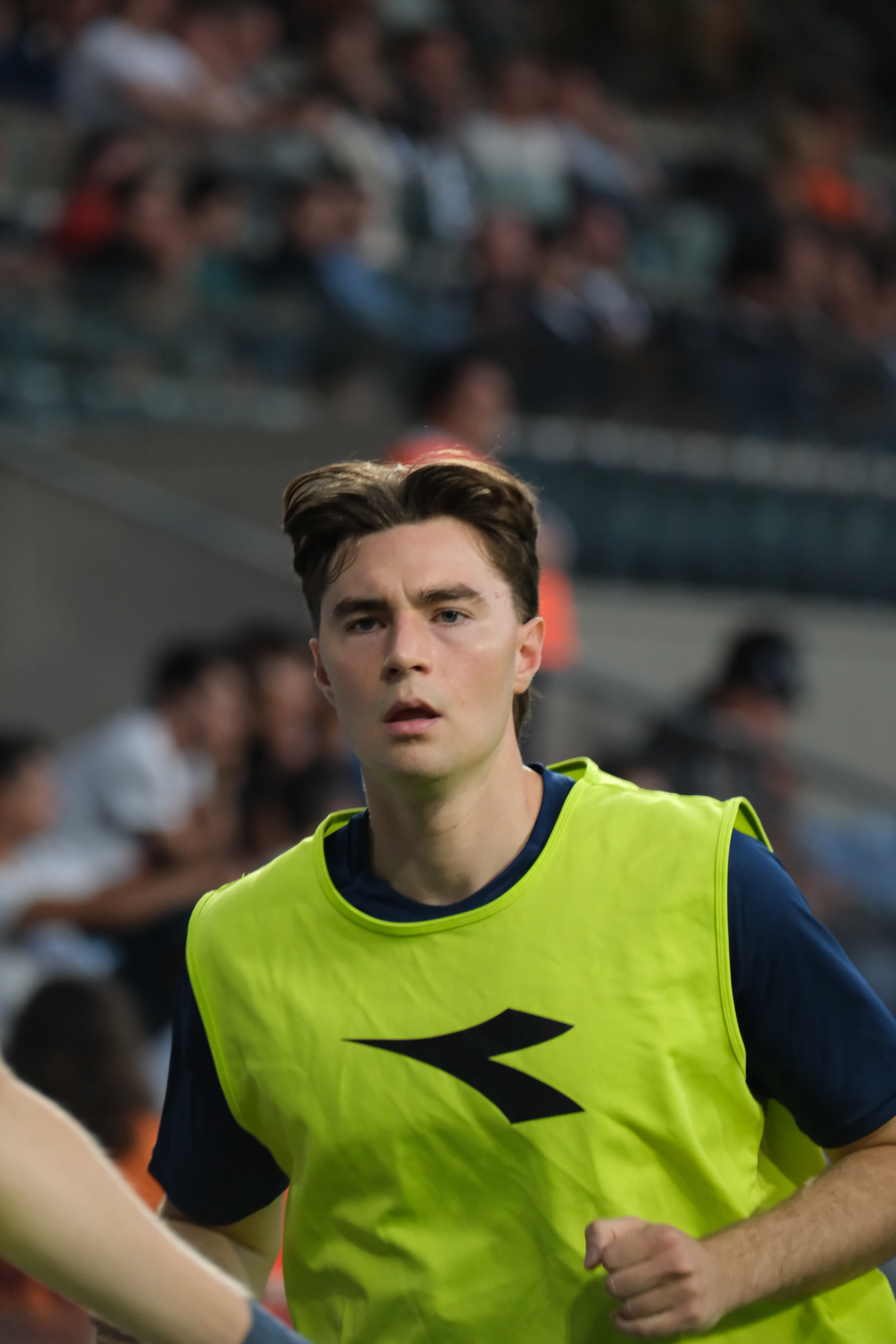
- Kvia-Egeskog with Viking in 2025

Personal information
- Date of birth: 26 May 2003 (age 23)
- Place of birth: Stavanger, Norway
- Height: 1.75 m (5 ft 9 in)
- Position: Midfielder

Team information
- Current team: Viking
- Number: 26

Youth career
- 2014–2022: Viking

Senior career*
Years	Team	Apps	(Gls)
2021–	Viking	85	(15)
2022	→ Skeid (loan)	6	(3)
2023	→ Hødd (loan)	5	(1)
2023	→ Skeid (loan)	15	(3)

International career
2021	Norway U18	3	(0)
- * Club domestic league appearances and goals as of 5 September 2026

Simen Kvia-Egeskog (born 26 May 2003) is a Norwegian professional footballer who plays as a midfielder for Viking.

== Career ==
On 29 June 2021, he signed a professional contract with Viking, lasting until 2024. On 10 July 2021, he made his Eliteserien debut in a 1–1 draw against Strømsgodset. In September 2022, he was loaned out to Norwegian First Division side Skeid.

Kvia-Egeskog made 28 appearances and scored five goals as Viking won the 2025 Eliteserien.

== Personal life ==
Kvia-Egeskog is a grandchild of Svein Kvia, who played 551 matches for Viking between 1965 and 1980.

== Career statistics ==
As of match played 4 September 2026

Appearances and goals by club, season and competition
Club	Season	League			National cup		Continental		Other		Total	
Club	Season	Division	Apps	Goals	Apps	Goals	Apps	Goals	Apps	Goals	Apps	Goals
Viking	2021	Eliteserien	12	0	2	0	—		—		14	0
Viking	2022	Eliteserien	2	0	2	0	1 (Note: Appearance(s) in UEFA Conference League)	0	—		5	0
Viking	2023	Eliteserien	0	0	2	0	—		—		2	0
Viking	2024	Eliteserien	24	3	4	2	—		—		28	5
Viking	2025	Eliteserien	28	5	5	1	4	0	—		37	6
Viking	2026	Eliteserien	19	7	2	0	2 (Note: Appearance(s) in UEFA Champions League)	0	—		23	7
Viking	Total		85	15	17	3	7	0	0	0	109	18
Skeid (loan)	2022	1. divisjon	6	3	0	0	—		2 (Note: Appearances in relegation play-offs)	0	8	3
Hødd (loan)	2023	1. divisjon	5	1	0	0	—		—		5	1
Skeid (loan)	2023	1. divisjon	15	3	0	0	—		—		15	3
Career total			111	22	17	3	7	0	2	0	137	25

== Honours ==
Viking

- Eliteserien: 2025
