= Tobias Moi =

Norwegian footballer (born 2006)

Personal information
- Full name: Tobias Saliou Moi Séne
- Date of birth: 3 March 2006 (age 20)
- Position: Midfielder

Team information
- Current team: Viking
- Number: 29

Youth career
- –2019: Sola
- 2019–2024: Viking

Senior career*
Years	Team	Apps	(Gls)
2024–	Viking	15	(0)
2025	→ Åsane (loan)	1	(0)

International career^{‡}
2022	Norway U16	4	(1)
2024	Norway U18	3	(0)
2025	Norway U20	5	(0)
2026–	Norway U21	5	(1)
- * Club domestic league appearances and goals as of 15:34, 29 September 2026 (UTC) ‡ National team caps and goals as of 07:38, 14 November 2026 (UTC)

Tobias Saliou Moi Séne (born 3 March 2006) is a Norwegian professional footballer who plays as a midfielder for Viking.

== Club career ==
Moi hails from Sola Municipality and started his career with Sola FK. He joined the academy of Viking FK at the age of 14. In April 2024, he signed a two-year contract with Viking. On 2 November 2024, he made his Eliteserien debut against Sandefjord.

In January 2025, he was promoted to the first-team squad and signed a new three-year contract. During the 2025 season, he was converted from a right-back to a defensive midfielder. In August 2025, he was loaned out to First Division club Åsane. He was recalled in September 2025, after making two appearances. On 17 April 2026, Moi signed to extend his contract with the club until 2029, while his previous deal was due to expire in 2027.

== International career ==
Moi was part of the Norway under-20 team at the 2025 FIFA U-20 World Cup. He was named player of the match in the game against Saudi Arabia.

== Personal life ==
Moi is of Colombian and Senegalese descent.

== Career statistics ==
As of match played 1 August 2026

Appearances and goals by club, season and competition
Club	Season	League			National cup		Continental		Total	
Club	Season	Division	Apps	Goals	Apps	Goals	Apps	Goals	Apps	Goals
Viking	2024	Eliteserien	1	0	1	0	—		2	0
Viking	2025	Eliteserien	0	0	0	0	2 (Note: Appearances in UEFA Conference League)	0	2	0
Viking	2026	Eliteserien	9	0	2	0	0	0	11	0
Viking	Total		10	0	3	0	2	0	15	0
Åsane (loan)	2025	1. divisjon	1	0	1	0	—		2	0
Career total			11	0	4	0	2	0	17	0

== Honours ==
Individual

- Eliteserien Young Player of the Month: May 2026
