= Essiën Bassey =

Dutch footballer

Personal information
- Full name: Essiën Elijah Gerrit Bassey
- Date of birth: November 1, 2006 (age 20)
- Place of birth: Aalten, Netherlands
- Height: 1.87 m (6 ft 1 1/2 in)
- Position: Right-back

Team information
- Current team: Viking
- Number: 17

Youth career
- 2010–2018: AZSV
- 2018–2022: De Graafschap
- 2022–2023: PSV

Senior career*
Years	Team	Apps	(Gls)
2023–2026	Jong PSV	27	(0)
2026	PSV	0	(0)
2026–	Viking	0	(0)

International career^{‡}
2021–2022	Netherlands U16	4	(0)
- * Club domestic league appearances and goals as of 02:42, 3 August 2026 (UTC) ‡ National team caps and goals as of 02:42, 3 August 2026 (UTC)

Essiën Elijah Gerrit Bassey (born 1 November 2006) is a Dutch professional footballer who plays as a right-back for Eliteserien club Viking.

== Early life and youth career ==
Bassey is a product of the youth academies of the Dutch club AZSV, De Graafschap and PSV. On 12 July 2023, he signed his first professional contract with PSV for seasons, and was assigned to the reserves On 29 November 2024, he debuted with Jong PSV as a substitute in a 1–0 Eerste Divisie win over FC Eindhoven. On 26 June 2026, he extended his contract with PSV for one more season. He debuted with the senior PSV team as a substitute in a 4–0 loss to AZ in the 2026 Johan Cruyff Shield on 2 August 2026.

On 2 September 2026, Bassey joined Eliteserien club Viking, signing a four-year contract.

== International career ==
Born in the Netherlands, Bassey is of Nigerian descent. He played for the Netherlands U16s in 2021.

== Career statistics ==
As of match played 2 August 2026

Appearances and goals by club, season and competition
Club	Season	League			Cup		Europe		Other		Total	
Club	Season	Division	Apps	Goals	Apps	Goals	Apps	Goals	Apps	Goals	Apps	Goals
Jong PSV	2024–25	Eerste Divisie	1	0	—		—		—		1	0
Jong PSV	2025–26	Eerste Divisie	27	0	—		—		1 (Note: Appearance in Premier League Cup)	0	28	0
Jong PSV	Total		28	0	—		—		1	0	29	0
PSV	2026–27	Eredivisie	0	0	0	0	0	0	1 (Note: Appearance in Johan Cruyff Shield)	0	1	0
Viking	2026	Eliteserien	0	0	0	0	0	0	—		0	0
Career total			28	0	0	0	0	0	2	0	30	0
