= 2006 NCAA Division II men's soccer tournament =

2006 NCAA Division II Men's Soccer Championship
Tournament details
- Country: United States
- Teams: 32

Final positions
- Champions: Dowling (1st title, 1st final)
- Runners-up: Fort Lewis (3rd final)

Tournament statistics
- Matches played: 31
- Goals scored: 103 (3.32 per match)

Awards
- Best player: Offense: Guy-Roland Kpene, Dowling; Defense: Thomas Vaaland, Dowling

The 2006 NCAA Division II Men's Soccer Championship was the 35th annual tournament held by the NCAA to determine the top men's Division II college soccer program in the United States. Thirty-two teams participated in the tournament.

The Dowling Golden Lions defeated Fort Lewis, 1–0, at the DII Championship Festival, held in Pensacola, Florida. Morten Jensen scored the match's lone goal in the 38th minute to give the Golden Lions the school's first national title.

Dowling, who finished the season 22–0–2, were coached by John Dirico.

== Brackets ==
=== Pool 1 ===
First round *Campus sites
2	Lenoir–Rhyne	3
Catawba	2
Lincoln Memorial	1(OT)
9	Carson–Newman	0
15	SIU Edwardsville	6
12	Mercyhurst	1
Wisc. Parkside	0
14	Northern Kentucky	4
CSU Dominguez Hills	1
Seattle	2(OT)
CSU Los Angeles	2
Seattle Pacific	1
3	Fort Lewis	3
Metropolitan State	1
17	Incarnate Word	0
6	Midwestern State	2

Second round *Campus sites
6	Lenoir-Rhyne	1(3)
Lincoln Memorial	1(5)
15	SIU Edwardsville	2
14	Northern Kentucky	3(OT)
Seattle	3(4)
CSU Los Angeles	3(3)
3	Fort Lewis	1(3)
6	Midwestern State	1(1)

Regional Finals; *Campus sites
10	Lincoln Memorial	2
Northern Kentucky	1
3	Fort Lewis	5
Seattle	2

Semifinals; November 16; Pensacola, Florida
3	Fort Lewis	4
10	Lincoln Memorial	2

=== Pool 2 ===
First round *Campus sites
10	Lander	0(1)
Queens (NC)	0(2)
19	Limestone	0(3)
USC Spartanburg	0(2)
3	West Florida	2(4)
20	Montevallo	2(1)
Rollins	0
5	Lynn	3
7	Franklin Pierce	1
Southern N.H.	0
Dominican (NY)	1
13	Southern Conn. St.	2
1	Dowling	3
C.W. Post	1
18	Lock Haven	2(OT)
7	East Stroudsburg	1

Second round *Campus sites
Queens (N.C.)	2
19	Limestone	1
3	West Florida	2
5	Lynn	1
7	Franklin Pierce	1
13	Southern Conn. St.	2
1	Dowling	4
18	Lock Haven	0

Regional Finals; *Campus sites
Queens (N.C.)	0
3	West Florida	2
13	Southern Conn. St.	1
1	Dowling	2(OT)

Semifinals; November 16; Pensacola, Florida
3	West Florida	3(3)
1	Dowling	3(5)

== Final ==
November 18, 2006

Dowling	1–0	Fort Lewis
Morten Jensen 37:59' (Kpene, Grady); Michael Bujan (yellow card) 38:26'; Robert Miller (yellow card) 46:30'; Thomas Vaaland (yellow card) 51:34'	Report 1 Report 2	Kieran Hall (yellow card) 38:18'

Ashton Brosnaham Stadium, Pensacola, Florida
Attendance: 550
Referee: Rich Huber

== See also ==
- NCAA Division I Men's Soccer Championship
- NCAA Division III Men's Soccer Championship
- NAIA Men's Soccer Championship
