= Vetle Auklend =

Norwegian footballer (born 2005)

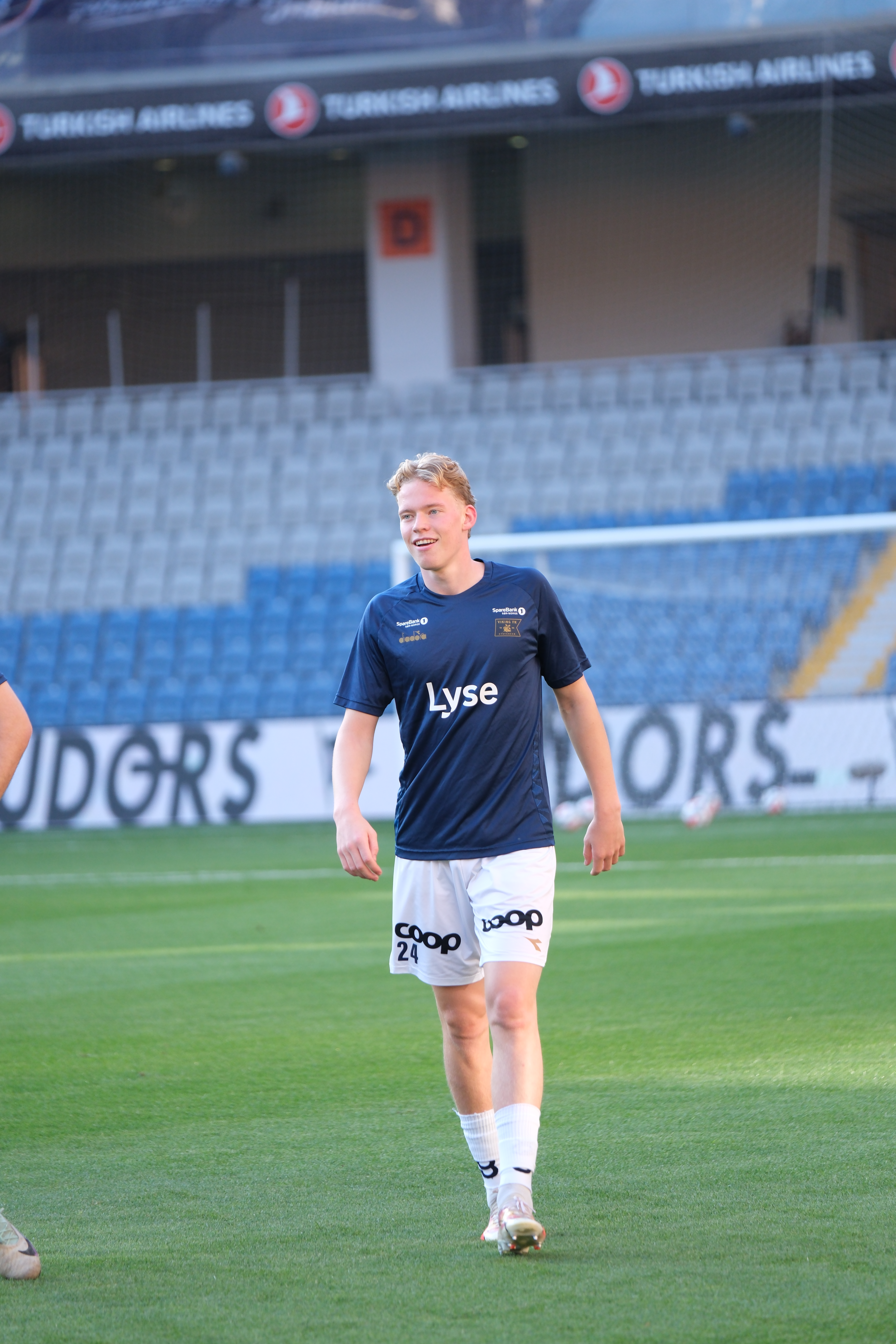
- Auklend with Viking in 2025

Personal information
- Date of birth: 22 March 2005 (age 21)
- Place of birth: Stavanger, Norway
- Position: Left-back

Team information
- Current team: Viking
- Number: 24

Youth career
- –2018: Vidar
- 2019–2023: Viking

Senior career*
Years	Team	Apps	(Gls)
2024–	Viking	19	(1)

International career^{‡}
2024	Norway U19	3	(0)
2025–	Norway U20	7	(0)
2026–	Norway U21	2	(0)
- * Club domestic league appearances and goals as of 10:52, 16 July 2026 (UTC) ‡ National team caps and goals as of 14 November 2026

Vetle Auklend (born 22 March 2005) is a Norwegian professional footballer who plays as a left-back for Eliteserien club Viking.

== Club career ==
Auklend grew up in the Stavanger borough of Sandal, and is a younger brother of fellow footballer Sondre Auklend.

Having played youth football in FK Vidar, Vetle Auklend came over to the academy of Viking FK in 2019. He made his competitive first-team debut in the cup in April 2024, followed by his Eliteserien debut eleven days later. He scored his first goal in June 2025. In 2025, he was competing to be the starting left back. He made seven appearances and scored one goal as Viking won the 2025 Eliteserien.

== International career ==
Auklend made his international debut for Norway U19 in July 2024, at the 2024 UEFA European Under-19 Championship in Northern Ireland, where he was included without a single cap to his name. The following year, he and the team made the 2025 FIFA U-20 World Cup. As Norway beat Paraguay U20, the opponents had a goal annulled via video assistant referee, as the video showed Vetle Auklend being shoved and trampled.

== Career statistics ==
As of match played 12 July 2026

Appearances and goals by club, season and competition
Club	Season	League			National cup (Note: Includes Norwegian Cup)		Continental		Total	
Club	Season	Division	Apps	Goals	Apps	Goals	Apps	Goals	Apps	Goals
Viking	2024	Eliteserien	5	0	4	0	—		9	0
Viking	2025	Eliteserien	7	1	6	0	2 (Note: Appearances in UEFA Conference League)	0	15	1
Viking	2026	Eliteserien	7	0	2	0	0	0	9	0
Viking	Total		19	1	12	0	2	0	33	1
Career total			19	1	12	0	2	0	33	1

== Honours ==
Viking

- Eliteserien: 2025
