= Niklas Fuglestad =

Norwegian footballer (born 2006)

Personal information
- Full name: Niklas Kemp Fuglestad
- Date of birth: 20 May 2006 (age 20)
- Position: Midfielder

Team information
- Current team: Viking
- Number: 23

Youth career
- Våganes
- –2021: Sola
- 2022–2024: Viking

Senior career*
Years	Team	Apps	(Gls)
2024–	Viking	31	(4)
2025	→ Moss (loan)	10	(1)

International career^{‡}
2024	Norway U18	7	(1)
2025	Norway U19	5	(0)
2025	Norway U20	4	(2)
2026–	Norway U21	5	(0)
- * Club domestic league appearances and goals as of 14 November 2026 ‡ National team caps and goals as of 14 November 2026

Niklas Kemp Fuglestad (born 20 May 2006) is a Norwegian footballer who plays as a midfielder for Eliteserien club Viking.

== Club career ==
He grew up in Sola Municipality as a nephew of footballer Erik Fuglestad. As a child, he was offered a move to the academy of Viking FK, but postponed the move to 2022.

In early 2024 he signed his first Viking contract, lasting until the end of 2026. At the end of 2024, it was prolonged to the end of 2028, as he was seen as a "sales prospect". He also helped Viking reach the final of the 2024 Norwegian Youth Cup.

He made his competitive first-team debut in Eliteserien in July 2024, followed by his first goal in April 2025 in the cup. In the summer of 2025, he was loaned out to Moss FK in the First Division, whom he helped survive the relegation playoff, though he missed in the decisive penalty shootout. Having played four Eliteserien matches in 2025 with Viking before the loan, he was league champion as Viking won the 2025 Eliteserien. He scored his first goal in the Eliteserien on March 21 2026, when he netted a brace against Molde.

== International career ==
Fuglestad made his international debut for Norway U18 in June 2024. In 2025, he was selected for the 2025 UEFA European Under-19 Championship, then for the 2025 FIFA U-20 World Cup back-to-back. As Norway beat Paraguay U20 in the round of 16, Fuglestad scored the winning goal in the 116th minute.

== Career statistics ==
As of match played 12 July 2026

Appearances and goals by club, season and competition
Club	Season	League			National cup (Note: Includes Norwegian Cup)		Other		Total	
Club	Season	Division	Apps	Goals	Apps	Goals	Apps	Goals	Apps	Goals
Viking	2024	Eliteserien	7	0	0	0	—		7	0
Viking	2025	Eliteserien	4	0	3	2	2 (Note: Appearances in UEFA Conference League)	0	9	2
Viking	2026	Eliteserien	10	2	2	0	0	0	12	2
Viking	Total		21	2	5	2	2	0	28	4
Moss (loan)	2025	1. divisjon	10	1	1	1	2 (Note: Appearances in relegation play-offs)	1	13	3
Career total			31	3	6	3	4	1	41	7

== Honours ==
Viking

- Eliteserien: 2025
