= Ola Visted =

Norwegian footballer (born 2005)

Personal information
- Date of birth: 30 March 2005 (age 21)
- Place of birth: Stavanger, Norway
- Position: Midfielder

Team information
- Current team: Viking
- Number: 15

Youth career
- –2019: Hinna
- 2020–2024: Viking

Senior career*
Years	Team	Apps	(Gls)
2025–	Viking	10	(0)
2025	→ Hødd (loan)	27	(4)

International career^{‡}
2025	Norway U20	9	(0)
- * Club domestic league appearances and goals as of 23 July 2026 ‡ National team caps and goals as of 14:35, 19 March 2026 (UTC)

Ola Visted (born 30 March 2005) is a Norwegian professional footballer who plays as a midfielder for Viking.

== Career ==
Visted hails from Hinna. On 10 March 2025, he signed a three-year contract with Viking. On 27 March 2025, he was loaned out to Hødd until the end of the 2025 season. He was named Hødd's player of the season after making 14 goal contributions in 30 games.

On 14 March 2026, Visted made his Eliteserien debut for Viking against HamKam. On 18 March 2026, he scored his first goal for Viking in a Norwegian Cup quarter-final against Aalesund. On 19 March 2026, his contract with Viking was extended until the end of 2029.

== Career statistics ==
As of match played 18 March 2026

Appearances and goals by club, season and competition
Club	Season	League			National cup		Continental		Total	
Club	Season	Division	Apps	Goals	Apps	Goals	Apps	Goals	Apps	Goals
Viking	2024	Eliteserien	0	0	1	0	—		1	0
Viking	2025	Eliteserien	0	0	0	0	—		0	0
Viking	2026	Eliteserien	1	0	2	1	0	0	3	1
Viking	Total		1	0	3	1	0	0	4	1
Hødd (loan)	2025	1. divisjon	27	4	3	0	—		30	4
Career total			28	4	6	1	0	0	34	5
