= Norway national under-21 football team =

National under-21 football team

Norway Under-21
- Association: Football Association of Norway (Norges Fotballforbund)
- Head coach: Jan Peder Jalland
- Most caps: Tommy Svindal Larsen (41)
- Top scorer: Trond Fredrik Ludvigsen (16)
First colours	Second colours

UEFA U-21 Championship
- Appearances: 3 (first in 1998)
- Best result: Third place (1998, 2013)

The Norway national under-21 football team, administered and controlled by the Norwegian Football Federation, is the national football team of Norway for players of 21 years of age or under at the start of a UEFA European Under-21 Championship campaign. The team has reached the European Championship finals three times, in 1998 and 2013, winning bronze medals on both occasions, and again in 2023.

== Competitive record ==
=== UEFA European Under-21 Championship Record ===
UEFA European Under-21 Championship record										UEFA European Under-21 Championship qualification record					
Year	Round	Position	Pld	W	D *	L	GF	GA		Pld	W	D	L	GF	GA
(Europe) 1978	did not qualify									4	2	0	2	6	9
(Europe) 1980	did not qualify									6	1	3	2	5	12
(Europe) 1982	did not qualify									4	1	1	2	5	6
(Europe) 1984	did not qualify									6	0	2	4	6	15
(Europe) 1986	did not qualify									6	2	2	2	10	9
(Europe) 1988	did not qualify									6	0	3	3	3	7
(Europe) 1990	did not qualify									6	1	2	3	3	7
(Europe) 1992	did not qualify									6	3	1	2	13	6
(France) 1994	did not qualify									10	6	1	3	20	13
(Spain) 1996	did not qualify									10	7	0	3	32	13
(Romania) 1998	Semi-Finals	3rd of 8	3	2	0	1	3	1		8	5	2	1	22	10
(Slovakia) 2000	Lost in qualifying play-off to Spain									12	7	1	4	22	15
(Switzerland) 2002	did not qualify									10	6	0	4	21	12
(Germany) 2004	Lost in qualifying play-off to Serbia and Montenegro									10	7	1	2	23	9
(Portugal) 2006	did not qualify									10	4	2	4	14	13
(Netherlands) 2007	did not qualify									2	0	1	1	1	2
(Sweden) 2009	did not qualify									8	3	3	2	7	6
(Denmark) 2011	did not qualify									8	2	1	5	14	18
(Israel) 2013	Semi-Finals	3rd of 8	4	1	2	1	6	7		10	6	1	3	18	11
(Czech Republic) 2015	did not qualify									8	3	0	5	11	19
(Poland) 2017	Lost in qualifying play-off to Serbia									10	6	1	3	13	12
(Italy) (San Marino) 2019	did not qualify									10	4	3	3	15	13
(Hungary) (Slovenia) 2021	did not qualify									8	3	1	4	14	16
(Romania) (Georgia (country)) 2023	Group stage	-	3	1	0	2	2	3		10	8	0	2	26	11
(Slovakia) 2025	Lost in qualifying play-off to Finland									12	7	1	4	31	17
(Albania) (Serbia) 2027	To be determined									To be determined					
Total	3rd	3/24	10	4	2	4	11	11	198	92	33	73	337	279	

Note: The year of the tournament represents the year in which it ends.

*Draws include knockout matches decided on penalty kicks.

== Players ==
=== Current squad ===
Players born on or after 1 January 2004 are eligible.

The following players were called up for the friendly matches against Poland on 13 November and Portugal on 17 November 2026.

Caps and goals correct as of 17 Novemebr 2026, after the match against Portugal. Names in bold denote players who have been capped for the senior team.

No.	Pos.	Player	Date of birth (age)	Caps	Goals	Club
1	GK	Martin Børsheim	18 February 2005 (age 21)	14	0	(Norwegian Football Federation) Fredrikstad
12	GK	Magnus Rugland Ree	26 April 2004 (age 22)	2	0	(Norwegian Football Federation) Bryne
2	DF	Oliver Braude	21 February 2004 (age 22)	19	0	(Royal Dutch Football Association) Heerenveen
3	DF	Runar Norheim	14 February 2005 (age 21)	11	0	(Danish Football Association) Nordsjælland
5	DF	Rasmus Holten	20 February 2005 (age 21)	14	1	(Norwegian Football Federation) Sandefjord
13	DF	Jonathan Norbye	26 March 2007 (age 19)	2	0	(Norwegian Football Federation) Haugesund
15	DF	Aleksander Hammer Kjelsen	3 January 2006 (age 20)	4	0	(Norwegian Football Federation) Aalesunds
19	DF	Vetle Auklend	22 March 2005 (age 21)	3	0	(Norwegian Football Federation) Viking
26	DF	Håkon Røsten	21 February 2005 (age 21)	1	0	(Norwegian Football Federation) KFUM
	DF	Nikolai Hopland	24 July 2004 (age 22)	8	0	(Danish Football Association) Randers
6	MF	Tobias Moi	3 March 2006 (age 20)	6	1	(Norwegian Football Federation) Viking
7	MF	**Sverre Nypan**	19 December 2006 (age 19)	16	1	(Royal Belgian Football Association) Lommel
8	MF	Jens Hjertø-Dahl	31 October 2005 (age 21)	13	1	(The Football Association) Hull City
14	MF	Niklas Ødegård	29 March 2004 (age 22)	12	3	(Norwegian Football Federation) Molde
16	MF	Jakob Segadal Hansen	16 June 2005 (age 21)	9	0	(Norwegian Football Federation) Viking
17	MF	Bo Hegland	18 June 2004 (age 22)	5	1	(Swedish Football Association) Djurgården
24	MF	Niklas Jensen Wassberg	24 February 2004 (age 22)	1	0	(Norwegian Football Federation) Brann
9	FW	**Sindre Walle Egeli**	21 June 2006 (age 20)	17	10	(The Football Association) Ipswich Town
10	FW	Marius Broholm	26 December 2004 (age 21)	17	4	(Royal Dutch Football Association) Utrecht
11	FW	Edvin Austbø	1 May 2005 (age 21)	11	0	(The Football Association) West Ham United
18	FW	Dennis Gjengaar	24 February 2004 (age 22)	5	0	(Norwegian Football Federation) Vålerenga
20	FW	Niklas Fuglestad	20 May 2006 (age 20)	5	0	(Norwegian Football Federation) Viking
21	FW	Henrik Skogvold	14 July 2004 (age 22)	12	3	(Norwegian Football Federation) Fredrikstad
22	FW	Alexander Røssing-Lelesiit	20 January 2007 (age 19)	2	0	(German Football Association) Hamburg

=== Recent call-ups ===
The following players have also been called up within the last twelve months and remain eligible for selection.

Pos.	Player	Date of birth (age)	Caps	Goals	Club	Latest call-up
GK	Einar Fauskanger	18 July 2008 (age 18)	0	0	(Norway) Haugesund	v. Bosnia and Herzegovina, 18 November 2025
DF	Eivind Helland	25 April 2005 (age 21)	14	1	(Italy) Bologna	v. Israel, 6 October 2026
DF	Vetle Walle Egeli	23 June 2004 (age 22)	3	0	(Norway) Sandefjord	v. Israel, 6 October 2026
DF	Sander Granheim	15 July 2007 (age 19)	0	0	(Norway) Start	v. Israel, 6 October 2026
DF	Magnus Bech Riisnæs	4 November 2004 (age 22)	6	0	(Norway) Bodø/Glimt	v. Finland, 8 June 2026
DF	Jonas Torsvik	24 May 2005 (age 21)	0	0	(Norway) Brann	v. Finland, 8 June 2026
MF	Victor Halvorsen	3 July 2004 (age 22)	8	0	(Norway) Sarpsborg 08	v. Israel, 6 October 2026
FW	Leander Alvheim^{WD}	15 September 2004 (age 22)	1	0	(Norway) Kristiansund	v. Poland, 13 November 2026
FW	Sander Kilen^{WD}	30 May 2005 (age 21)	1	0	(Norway) Molde	v. Poland, 13 November 2026
FW	Kristian Lonebu^{WD}	18 February 2006 (age 20)	1	0	(Norway) Molde	v. Poland, 13 November 2026
FW	Daniel Bassi	31 October 2004 (age 22)	9	1	(Norway) Lillestrøm	v. Israel, 6 October 2026
FW	Jesper Reitan-Sunde	31 January 2006 (age 20)	4	0	(Norway) Rosenborg	v. Finland, 8 June 2026
FW	Erik Flataker	26 December 2004 (age 21)	1	0	(Sweden) AIK	v. Bosnia and Herzegovina, 18 November 2025

== Records ==
As of 14 June 2022

=== Leading appearances ===
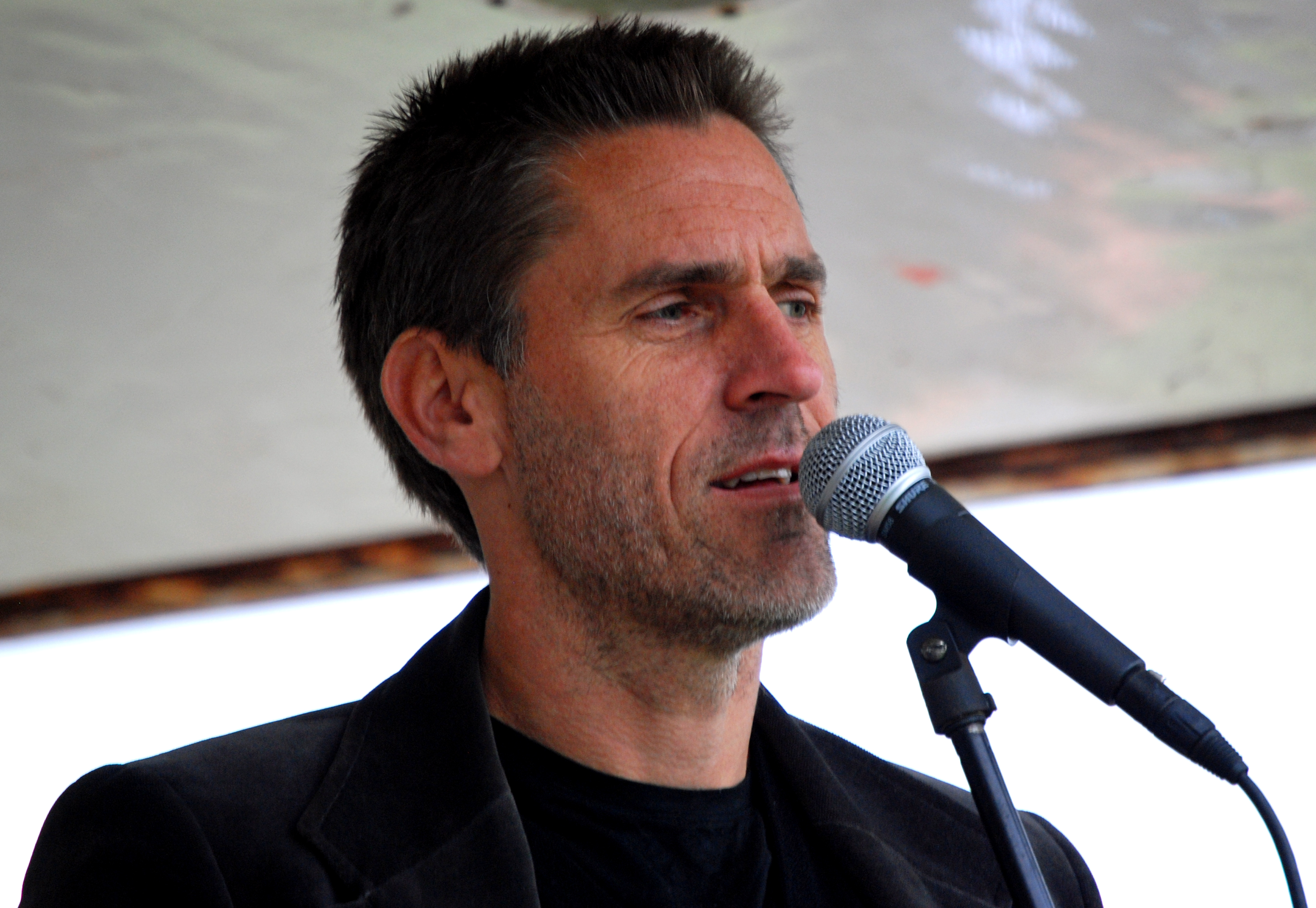
Tommy Svindal Larsen currently holds the record for the most appearances for the team.

Rank	Player	Club(s)	U-21 Caps
1	Tommy Svindal Larsen	Start, Stabæk	41
2	Hai Ngoc Tran	Kongsvinger	38
3	Harmeet Singh	Vålerenga, Feyenoord	36
4	Trond Fredrik Ludvigsen	Bodø/Glimt, Hertha BSC	35
4	Petter Rudi	Molde	35
6	Kristian Flittie Onstad	Lyn	34
7	Azar Karadas	Brann, Rosenborg	33
7	Steinar Pedersen	Start, Borussia Dortmund	33
9	Trond Erik Bertelsen	Haugesund, Fredrikstad	32
9	Thomas Holm	Heerenveen, Vålerenga	32

Note: Club(s) represents the permanent clubs during the player's time in the Under-21s. Those players in bold are still eligible to play for the team.

=== Leading goalscorers ===
As of 17 November 2026

Rank	Player	Club(s)	U-21 Goals
1	Trond Fredrik Ludvigsen	Bodø/Glimt, Hertha BSC	16
2	Tore André Flo	Sogndal, Tromsø	15
3	Steffen Iversen	Rosenborg, Tottenham Hotspur	14
4	Ole Gunnar Solskjær	Clausenengen, Molde	13
5	Azar Karadas	Brann, Rosenborg	12
5	Daniel Berg Hestad	Molde	12
5	Frank Strandli	Start, Leeds United	12
8	Tommy Svindal Larsen	Start, Stabæk	11
8	Jørgen Strand Larsen	Sarpsborg 08, Groningen	11
10	John Carew	Vålerenga, Rosenborg, Valencia	10
10	Morten Gamst Pedersen	Tromsø	10
10	**Sindre Walle Egeli**	Nordsjælland, Ipswich	10

Note: Club(s) represents the permanent clubs during the player's time in the Under-21s. The players in bold are still eligible to play for the team.

== Past squads ==
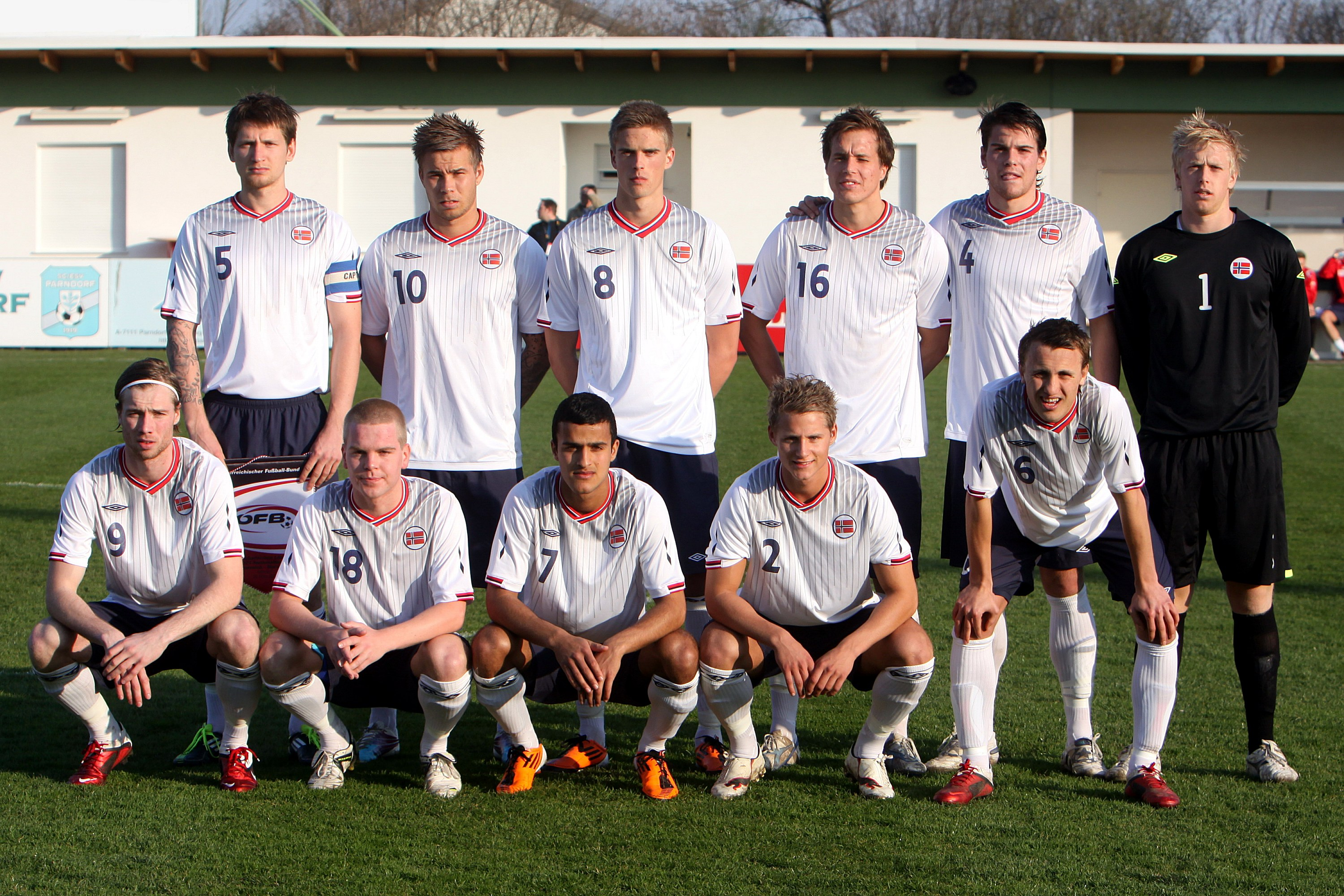
Norway U-21-national football team in 2011

- 1998 UEFA European Under-21 Championship squad
- 2013 UEFA European Under-21 Championship squad

== Coaches ==
- 1974: (Norway) Nils Arne Eggen
- 1979–1985: (Norway) Egil Olsen
- 1996–1998: (Norway) Nils Johan Semb
- 2000–2003: (Norway) Per-Mathias Høgmo
- 2003–2006: (Norway) Hallvar Thoresen
- 2006–2010: (Norway) Øystein Gåre
- 2010: (Norway) Tor Ole Skullerud
- 2011–2013: (Norway) Per Joar Hansen
- 2013: (Norway) Tor Ole Skullerud
- 2014–2023: (Norway) Leif Gunnar Smerud
- 2023–present: (Norway) Jan Peder Jalland

== See also ==
- Norway national football team
- Norway national under-19 football team
- Norway national under-17 football team
- Norway women's national football team
