= Leander Alvheim =

Norwegian footballer (born 2006)

Personal information
- Full name: Leander Næss Alvheim
- Date of birth: 15 September 2004 (age 22)
- Height: 1.93 m (6 ft 4 in)
- Position: Forward

Team information
- Current team: Kristiansund
- Number: 19

Youth career
- –2018: Nordlandet/Dahle
- 2019–2022: Kristiansund

Senior career*
Years	Team	Apps	(Gls)
2023–	Kristiansund	73	(22)
2025	→ Ranheim (loan)	8	(3)

International career^{‡}
2026–	Norway U21	1	(0)
- * Club domestic league appearances and goals as of 22 November 2026 ‡ National team caps and goals as of 29 September 2026

Leander Alvheim (born 15 September 2004) is a Norwegian footballer who plays as a forward for Kristiansund BK.

== Career ==
He started his youth career in IL Nordlandet and played for cooperative teams of Nordlandet and Dahle IL. In 2019 he joined the academy of the city's main team, Kristiansund BK. He made his senior debut in a friendly match in 2023, followed by his official league debut and a new contract until the end of 2027.

In the late spring of 2025, he was sent on a short-term loan to Ranheim IL. Alvheim scored in his debut for the second-tier club.

He notably scored a double against Sandefjord in August 2025. In November 2025, he was fielded by Kristiansund BK though he should have served a suspension, having picked up four yellow cards. This was brought to KBK's attention during the first half. Kristiansund tried to substitute him off in the 43rd minute to ameliorate the situation, but opponents Vålerenga submitted a formal protest.

Ahead of the 2026 season, he prolonged his Kristiansund contract until the end of 2029. After scoring in three matches in a row in May 2026, it was speculated whether he would be bought by another club in the summer. He followed with a decisive goal in a victory over neighbours Molde in August 2026.

== Career statistics ==
=== Club ===
As of match played 22 November 2026

Appearances and goals by club, season and competition
Club	Season	League			Cup		Europe		Other		Total	
Club	Season	Division	Apps	Goals	Apps	Goals	Apps	Goals	Apps	Goals	Apps	Goals
Kristiansund	2023	OBOS-ligaen	17	4	3	1	—		—		20	5
Kristiansund	2024	Eliteserien	10	0	0	0	—		—		10	0
Kristiansund	2025	Eliteserien	21	5	5	2	—		—		26	7
Kristiansund	2026	Eliteserien	25	13	3	3	—		—		28	16
Kristiansund	Total		73	22	11	6	—		—		84	28
Ranheim (loan)	2025	OBOS-ligaen	8	3	0	0	—		—		8	3
Career total			81	25	11	6	—		—		92	31
