= Einar Fauskanger =

Norwegian association football player

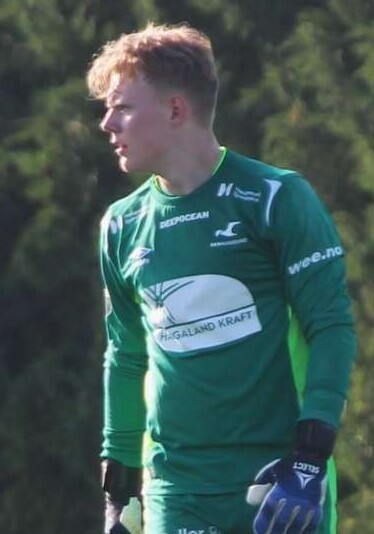
- Fauskanger in 2024

Personal information
- Full name: Einar Bøe Fauskanger
- Date of birth: 18 July 2008 (age 18)
- Place of birth: Norway
- Height: 1.88 m (6 ft 2 in)
- Position: Goalkeeper

Team information
- Current team: FK Haugesund
- Number: 21

Youth career
- 2014–2020: Haugar
- 2020–2022: Vard Haugesund
- 2022–2024: FK Haugesund

Senior career*
Years	Team	Apps	(Gls)
2024–	FK Haugesund	12	(0)

International career^{‡}
2023	Norway U15	4	(0)
2024	Norway U16	10	(0)
2025–	Norway U17	3	(0)
2025–	Norway U18	1	(0)
2025–	Norway U20	4	(0)
- * Club domestic league appearances and goals as of 1 December 2025 ‡ National team caps and goals as of 13 October 2025

Einar Bøe Fauskanger (born 18 July 2008) is a Norwegian professional footballer who plays as a goalkeeper for FK Haugesund.

== Club career ==
Fauskanger began playing youth football with Haugar before joining Vard Haugesund in 2020. In 2022, at the age of 13, he moved to the academy of FK Haugesund and took part in his first senior training session in June that year.

On 1 August 2023, aged 15 years and 14 days, Fauskanger signed his first professional contract with Haugesund. A year later, he agreed to a contract extension keeping him at the club until the summer of 2027.

Fauskanger made his Eliteserien debut in the final round of the 2024 season against Odd, aged 16 years and 136 days, becoming the youngest goalkeeper in league history and breaking Ola By Rise's record set in 1977.

== International career ==
Fauskanger has represented Norway at under-15, under-16 and under-17 levels. He captained the under-16 team in a match against Denmark in August 2024.

== Personal life ==
He is a son of FK Haugesund general manager Martin Fauskanger.
