= Norway national under-20 football team =

Norway Under-20
- Nickname: U20-landslaget
- Association: Football Association of Norway (Norges Fotballforbund)
- Head coach: Bjørn Johansen
- Most caps: Lasse Nordås / David Møller Wolfe (9)
- Top scorer: Erling Haaland (11)
First colours	Second colours

First international
- Portugal 3–0 Norway (Lisbon, Portugal; 26 January 1989)

Biggest win
- Norway 12–0 Honduras (Lublin, Poland; 30 May 2019)

Biggest defeat
- Portugal 3–0 Norway (Lisbon, Portugal; 26 January 1989); Norway 0–3 Mexico (Adelaide, Australia; 7 March 1989); Portugal 3–0 Norway (Madeira, Portugal; 7 March 2003)

FIFA U-20 World Cup
- Appearances: 4 (first in 1989)
- Best result: Quarter Finals (2025)

The Norway national under-20 football team, controlled by the Football Association of Norway, is the national football team of Norway for players of 20 years of age or under at the start of a FIFA U-20 World Cup campaign. It competes for Norway if they qualify for the FIFA U-20 World Cup through the UEFA European Under-19 Championship.

== Competitive record ==
=== FIFA U-20 World Cup ===
Year	Result	GP	W	D*	L	GS	GA
(Tunisia) 1977	Did not qualify						
(Japan) 1979	Did not qualify						
(Australia) 1981	Did not qualify						
(Mexico) 1983	Did not qualify						
(Soviet Union) 1985	Did not qualify						
(Chile) 1987	Did not qualify						
(Saudi Arabia) 1989	Group stage	3	1	0	2	4	5
(Portugal) 1991	Did not qualify						
(Australia) 1993	Group stage	3	0	1	2	0	5
(Qatar) 1995	Did not qualify						
(Malaysia) 1997	Did not qualify						
(Nigeria) 1999	Did not qualify						
(Argentina) 2001	Did not qualify						
(United Arab Emirates) 2003	Did not qualify						
(Netherlands) 2005	Did not qualify						
(Canada) 2007	Did not qualify						
(Egypt) 2009	Did not qualify						
(Colombia) 2011	Did not qualify						
(Turkey) 2013	Did not qualify						
(New Zealand) 2015	Did not qualify						
(South Korea) 2017	Did not qualify						
(Poland) 2019	Group Stage	3	1	0	2	13	5
(Argentina) 2023	Did not qualify						
(Chile) 2025	Quarter-finals	5	2	2	1	4	3
(Azerbaijan) (Uzbekistan) 2027	To be determined						
(Armenia) (Georgia (country)) 2029	To be determined						
Total	4/26	14	4	3	7	21	18

== Players ==
=== Current squad ===
- The following players were called up for the 2025 FIFA U-20 World Cup.
- Match dates: 29 September, 2 and 6 October 2025
- Opposition: Nigeria, Colombia and Saudi Arabia
- Caps and goals correct as of: 13 October 2025, after the match against France.

No.	Pos.	Player	Date of birth (age)	Caps	Goals	Club
1	GK	Sander Østraat	2 February 2005 (age 21)	3	0	(Norwegian Football Federation) HamKam
12	GK	Magnus Brøndbo	2 March 2005 (age 21)	2	0	(Norwegian Football Federation) Bodø/Glimt
21	GK	Einar Fauskanger	18 July 2008 (age 18)	4	0	(Norwegian Football Federation) Haugesund
2	DF	Luca Høyland	26 June 2006 (age 20)	4	0	(Norwegian Football Federation) Skeid
3	DF	Vetle Auklend	22 March 2005 (age 21)	7	0	(Norwegian Football Federation) Viking
4	DF	Rasmus Holten	20 May 2005 (age 21)	5	2	(Norwegian Football Federation) Sogndal
5	DF	Håkon Røsten	21 February 2005 (age 21)	8	0	(Norwegian Football Federation) Ranheim
13	DF	Mathias Øren	21 April 2006 (age 20)	3	0	(Norwegian Football Federation) Sogndal
14	DF	Jonathan Norbye	26 March 2007 (age 19)	5	0	(German Football Association) Arminia Bielefeld
6	MF	Kasper Sætherbø	21 January 2005 (age 21)	6	0	(Norwegian Football Federation) Mjøndalen
7	MF	Markus Haaland	8 March 2005 (age 21)	9	0	(Norwegian Football Federation) Brann
10	MF	Sondre Granaas	30 August 2006 (age 20)	5	0	(Norwegian Football Federation) Molde
15	MF	Ola Visted	30 March 2005 (age 21)	9	0	(Norwegian Football Federation) Hødd
16	MF	Martin Håheim-Elveseter	29 December 2005 (age 20)	7	0	(Norwegian Football Federation) Egersund
17	MF	Niklas Fuglestad	20 May 2006 (age 20)	4	2	(Norwegian Football Federation) Moss
18	MF	Tobias Moi	3 March 2006 (age 20)	5	0	(Norwegian Football Federation) Viking
19	MF	Lars Remmem	18 February 2006 (age 20)	2	0	(Norwegian Football Federation) Brann
8	FW	Gustav Nyheim	13 February 2006 (age 20)	3	0	(Norwegian Football Federation) Molde
9	FW	Julian Lægreid	8 March 2007 (age 19)	3	0	(Norwegian Football Federation) Brann
11	FW	Bork Bang-Kittilsen	22 March 2005 (age 21)	9	0	(Swedish Football Association) Mjällby
20	FW	Magnus Holte	27 March 2006 (age 20)	5	0	(Norwegian Football Federation) Hødd

=== Recent call-ups ===
The following players have last been called up within the last twelve months and remain eligible for selection.

Pos.	Player	Date of birth (age)	Caps	Goals	Club	Latest call-up

== Head-to-head record ==
The following table shows Norway's head-to-head record in the FIFA U-20 World Cup.

Opponent	Pld	W	D	L	GF	GA	GD	Win %
Argentina	1	0	0	1	0	2	−2	0.00
Brazil	1	0	0	1	0	2	−2	0.00
Colombia	1	0	1	0	0	0	+0	0.00
France					—			
Honduras	1	1	0	0	12	0	+12	100.00
Iraq	1	0	0	1	0	1	−1	0.00
Mexico	1	0	0	1	0	3	−3	0.00
New Zealand	1	0	0	1	0	2	−2	0.00
Nigeria	1	1	0	0	1	0	+1	100.00
Paraguay	1	1	0	0	1	0	+1	100.00
Saudi Arabia	2	0	2	0	1	1	+0	0.00
Spain	1	1	0	0	4	2	+2	100.00
Uruguay	1	0	0	1	1	3	−2	0.00
Total	13	4	3	6	20	16	+4	30.77

== Records ==
FIFA U-20 World Cup

- Biggest win by any team in FIFA U-20 World Cup history (12–0 win against Honduras at 2019 FIFA U-20 World Cup).
