= Morten Jensen (football coach) =

Norwegian football coach (born 1980)

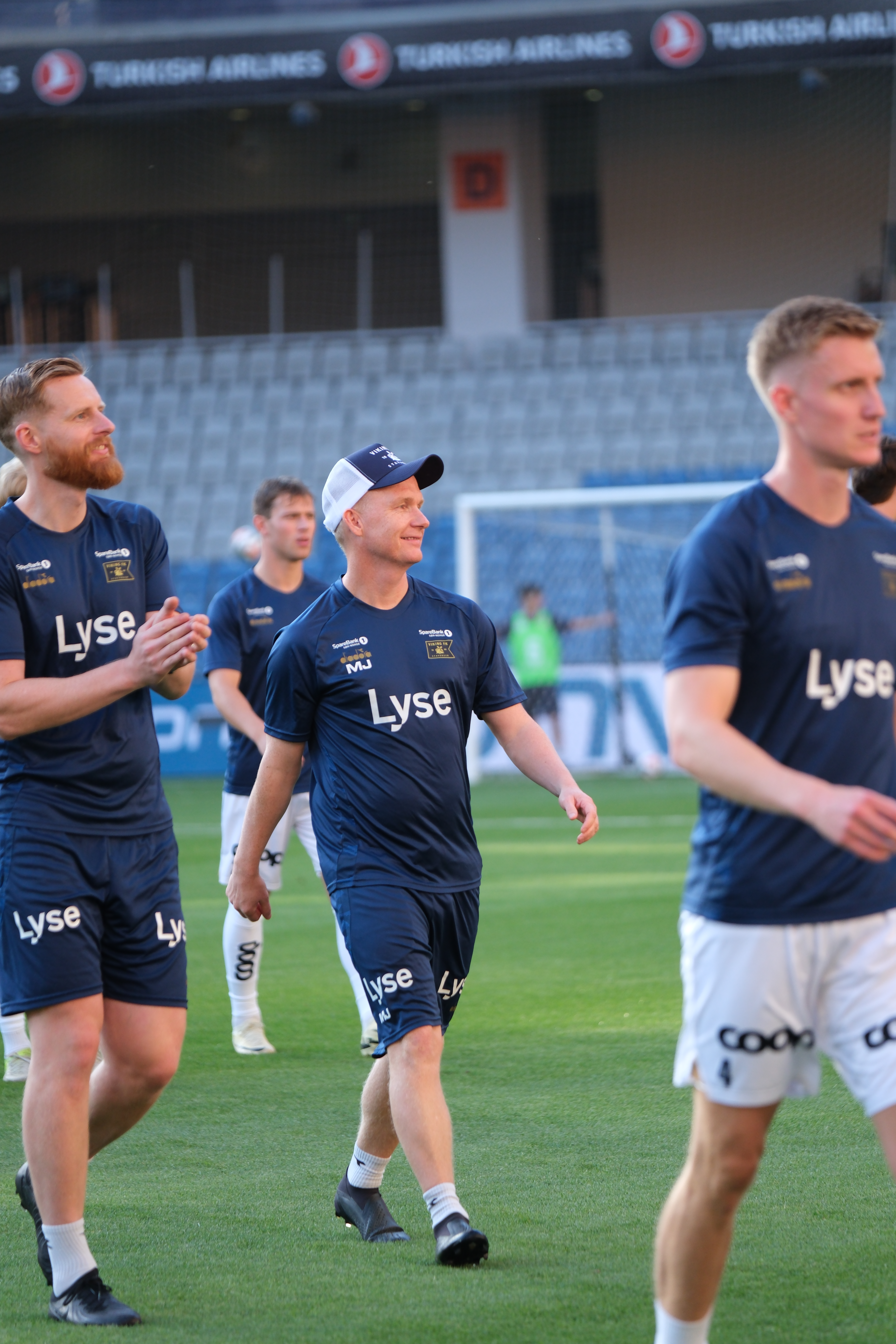
- Jensen (middle) in 2025

Personal information
- Full name: Morten Christoffer Jensen
- Date of birth: 9 March 1980 (age 46)
- Place of birth: Tananger, Norway
- Position: Forward

Team information
- Current team: Viking (manager)

Youth career
- –1992: Havørn
- 1992–1998: Vidar
- 1998–1999: Viking

College career
Years	Team	Apps	(Gls)
2003–2006	Dowling Golden Lions		

Senior career*
Years	Team	Apps	(Gls)
2000–2002	Vidar		
2003–2004	Havørn		
2007	Stavanger		
2008–2010	Vidar		
2010–2012	Brodd		
2013–2016	Havørn	33	(21)

Managerial career
- 2013–2016: Havørn
- 2017: Vidar
- 2021–: Viking
- * Club domestic league appearances and goals

Morten Christoffer Jensen (born 9 March 1980) is a Norwegian professional football coach and former player who is currently head coach of Eliteserien club Viking.

Jensen played youth football at Havørn, Vidar and Viking, in addition to college soccer for the Dowling Golden Lions. His senior career was spent at lower-league clubs Vidar, Havørn, Stavanger and Brodd. He started his coaching career with Havørn in 2013. In 2017 he was head coach of Vidar, and from 2018 to 2020 he was an assistant coach at Viking. Since 2021 he has been head coach of Viking alongside Bjarte Lunde Aarsheim.

== Playing career ==
Jensen started playing football for Tananger-based side Havørn, before transferring to Stavanger-based side Vidar at age 12. Aged 18 he tried his luck at Eliteserien club Viking, but a groin injury hindered his development, and kept him on the sideline for one and a half years.

After his unsuccessful spell at Viking, Jensen returned to Second Division club Vidar to play first team football. He spent most of his playing career at local clubs in the lower divisions in Norway, but he also played college soccer in the US for the Dowling Golden Lions, where he had a successful spell. He joined the club in 2003. In the 2004 season, Jensen scored 27 goals and made 16 assists in 19 matches. In June 2005, he was on trial at Eliteserien club Tromsø. In 2006, the Dowling Golden Lions won the NCAA Division II Men's Soccer Championship, and Jensen scored the game-winning goal in the final. He finished the 2006 season with 24 goals and 10 assists, and was awarded NSCAA Division II National Player of the Year. He also made some appearances for Havørn during 2003 and 2004.

In August 2007, he returned to Norway, signing for Second Division club Stavanger IF. In 2008, he played for Third Division club Vidar. Vidar were promoted to the Second Division in 2009, and in June 2010, Jensen moved to Third Division club Brodd.

== Managerial career ==
=== Havørn and Vidar ===
Jensen left Brodd to become player-coach of Fifth Division club Havørn ahead of the 2013 season. The club earned promotion in his first season. He stayed at the club for three more seasons, before being appointed head coach of Second Division club Vidar on 8 December 2016. He stayed at Vidar for one season, in which Vidar finished 4th in group 2 of the 2017 Second Division.

=== Viking ===
On 19 December 2017, he became assistant coach under Bjarne Berntsen at newly relegated Eliteserien club Viking. He served as an assistant coach for three seasons, in which the club earned promotion to the top division in 2018, and won the Norwegian Football Cup in 2019. On 26 November 2020, it was announced that head coach Bjarne Berntsen would leave Viking after the 2020 season. Simultaneously, it was announced that Jensen and Bjarte Lunde Aarsheim would replace Berntsen, taking over as joint head coaches on two-year contracts. Like Jensen, Aarsheim was also an assistant coach at the club before being appointed head coach. They took charge ahead of the 2021 season. Viking finished the 2021 season in third place, and on 25 March 2022, the head coaches' contracts were extended until the end of the 2025 season. On 25 November 2024, the contracts were extended until the end of the 2028 season. Viking won the 2025 Eliteserien, the club's first league title since 1991, with Jensen and Aarsheim being named Coaches of the Year.

== Managerial statistics ==
As of match played 11 Septembar 2026

Team	From	To	Record					Reference(s)
Team	From	To	G	W	D	L	Win %	Reference(s)
Havørn	1 January 2013	31 December 2016	86	51	17	18	59.30	
Vidar	1 January 2017	31 December 2017	27	13	3	11	48.15	
Viking	1 January 2021	Present	211	124	37	50	58.77	
Total			324	188	57	79	58.02	—

== Honours ==
=== Player ===
Dowling Golden Lions

- NCAA Division II Men's Soccer Championship: 2006

Individual

- NSCAA Division II National Player of the Year: 2006

=== Manager ===
Viking

- Eliteserien: 2025

Individual

- Eliteserien Coach of the Month: August 2021, July 2023, August 2023, May 2025, November 2025, May 2026
- Eliteserien Coach of the Year: 2025
