= 2018 Viking FK season =

Viking FK
2018 season
- Chair: Stig Christiansen
- Manager: Bjarne Berntsen
- Stadium: Viking Stadion
- 1. divisjon: 1st (promoted)
- Norwegian Cup: Second round vs Bryne
- Top goalscorer: League: Tommy Høiland (21); All: Tommy Høiland (23)
- Highest home attendance: 15,900 vs Kongsvinger (11 November)
- Lowest home attendance: 6,009 vs Jerv (22 July)
- Average home league attendance: 7,900
Home colours	Away colours

The 2018 season was Viking's 1st year back in 1. divisjon, after 29 consecutive seasons in the top flight of Norwegian football.

== Season events ==
On 18 December 2017, Bjarne Berntsen was appointed manager.

== Squad ==
As of 25 September 2018

Note: Flags indicate national team as defined under FIFA eligibility rules; some limited exceptions apply. Players may hold more than one non-FIFA nationality.

No.	Pos.	Nation	Player
1	GK	NOR	Iven Austbø
2	DF	NOR	Rasmus Martinsen
3	DF	NOR	Viljar Vevatne (captain)
4	DF	NOR	Tord Salte
5	DF	NOR	Markus Nakkim (on loan from Vålerenga)
6	DF	ISL	Axel Andrésson (on loan from Reading)
7	FW	NOR	Zymer Bytyqi
9	MF	NOR	Fredrik Torsteinbø
10	FW	NOR	Tommy Høiland
11	FW	NOR	Zlatko Tripić (vice-captain)
12	GK	NOR	Erik Arnebrott
14	MF	NOR	André Danielsen
15	GK	NOR	Amund Wichne

No.	Pos.	Nation	Player
16	FW	NOR	Even Østensen
17	MF	DEN	Steffen Ernemann
18	DF	NOR	Sondre Bjørshol
19	DF	NOR	Kristian Novak
20	FW	NOR	Ylldren Ibrahimaj
21	MF	NOR	Harald Nilsen Tangen
22	DF	DEN	Claes Kronberg
23	DF	NOR	Rolf Daniel Vikstøl
24	MF	NOR	Jonas Pereira
25	FW	NGR	Usman Sale
27	MF	NOR	Johnny Furdal
28	MF	NOR	Kristian Thorstvedt

== Transfers ==
=== Winter ===
In: Note: Flags indicate national team as defined under FIFA eligibility rules; some limited exceptions apply. Players may hold more than one non-FIFA nationality.

No.	Pos.	Nation	Player
3	DF	NOR	Viljar Vevatne (from (Norway) Sandnes Ulf)
4	DF	NOR	Tord Salte (on loan from (France) Lyon)
5	DF	NOR	Markus Nakkim (on loan from (Norway) Vålerenga)
6	DF	NOR	Leo Skiri Østigård (on loan from (Norway) Molde)
8	FW	NGR	Aniekpeno Udo (loan return from (Sweden) Ljungskile)
11	FW	NOR	Zlatko Tripić (from (Moldova) Sheriff Tiraspol)
12	GK	NOR	Erik Arnebrott (from (Norway) Viking 2)
21	MF	ENG	Jordan Hallam (on loan from (England) Sheffield United)
23	DF	NOR	Rolf Daniel Vikstøl (from (Norway) Start)
28	MF	NOR	Kristian Thorstvedt (from (Norway) Stabæk)
30	FW	NOR	Stian Michalsen (loan return from (Sweden) Ljungskile)
31	MF	NOR	Harald Nilsen Tangen (from (Norway) Viking 2)

Out: Note: Flags indicate national team as defined under FIFA eligibility rules; some limited exceptions apply. Players may hold more than one non-FIFA nationality.

No.	Pos.	Nation	Player
3	DF	NOR	Andreas Nordvik (to (Denmark) Fredericia)
4	DF	ESP	José Cruz (to (Spain) Mérida)
7	MF	ENG	George Green (to (England) Nuneaton Town)
8	MF	ENG	Ross Jenkins (to (Scotland) Hamilton Academical)
13	DF	CRO	Šime Gregov (to (Iran) Tractor Sazi)
19	MF	NOR	Michael Haukås (released)
20	FW	NOR	Tor André Skimmeland Aasheim (to (Norway) Jerv)
21	MF	NOR	Herman Kleppa (to (Norway) Sandnes Ulf, previously on loan at (Norway) Vidar)
27	FW	NOR	Mathias Bringaker (to (Norway) Start)
28	DF	NOR	Kristoffer Haugen (to (Norway) Molde)
99	FW	CIV	Ghislain Guessan (released)
—	DF	NOR	Erik Steen (to (Norway) Vidar, previously on loan)

=== Summer ===
In: Note: Flags indicate national team as defined under FIFA eligibility rules; some limited exceptions apply. Players may hold more than one non-FIFA nationality.

No.	Pos.	Nation	Player
4	DF	NOR	Tord Salte (from (France) Lyon, previously on loan)
6	DF	ISL	Axel Andrésson (on loan from (England) Reading)
16	FW	NOR	Even Østensen (from (Norway) Staal Jørpeland)
18	DF	NOR	Sondre Bjørshol (from (Norway) Åsane)
20	FW	NOR	Ylldren Ibrahimaj (from (Norway) Mjøndalen)
27	MF	NOR	Johnny Furdal (from (Norway) Nest-Sotra)

Out: Note: Flags indicate national team as defined under FIFA eligibility rules; some limited exceptions apply. Players may hold more than one non-FIFA nationality.

No.	Pos.	Nation	Player
6	DF	NOR	Leo Skiri Østigård (loan return to (Norway) Molde)
8	FW	NGR	Aniekpeno Udo (to (Sweden) Ljungskile)
18	MF	NOR	Julian Ryerson (to (Germany) Union Berlin)
21	MF	ENG	Jordan Hallam (loan return to (England) Sheffield United)
26	MF	NOR	Tore André Sørås (to (Norway) KFUM Oslo)
30	FW	NOR	Stian Michalsen (to (Norway) Arendal)

== Friendlies ==
=== Pre-season ===
Win Draw Loss

3 February 2018 Friendly	Viking	0–3	Bryne	Randaberg, Norway
15:15 CET (UTC+2)	Novak (yellow card) 47'; Pereira (yellow card) 60'	Report	Berntsen 3' el Ghaouti 42', 48' (pen.)	Stadium: Randaberg Arena; Attendance: 1,440

8 February 2018 Friendly	Brann	3–2	Viking	Bergen, Norway
14:00 CET (UTC+2)	Skålevik 4'; Koomson 29'; Børven 54'	Report	Bytyqi 27'; Novak 74'	Stadium: Vestlandshallen; Attendance: 349; Referee: Kristoffer Hagenes

16 February 2018 Friendly	Haugesund	1–2	Viking	Veavågen, Norway
18:00 CET (UTC+2)	Gytkjær 54'	Report	Sale 34'; Novak 37' (yellow card); Vevatne (yellow card) 89'	Stadium: Karmøy Storhall; Attendance: 810; Referee: Ole Petter Grindheim

23 February 2018 Friendly	Sandnes Ulf	0–1	Viking	Varhaug, Norway
17:00 CET (UTC+2)		Report	Høiland 62'	Stadium: Varhaug Stadion; Attendance: 500; Referee: Ola Kellerhals

28 February 2018 Friendly	Stabæk	2–1	Viking	Marbella, Spain
16:00 CET (UTC+2)	Omoijuanfo 38'; Nakkim 60' (o.g.)	Report	Bringaker 20'	Attendance: 30

9 March 2018 Friendly	Viking	1–1	Åsane	Nærbø, Norway
16:30 CET (UTC+2)	Kronberg 5'	Report	Fantoft (yellow card) 18'; Hestetun 26' (pen.)	Stadium: Nye Loen; Attendance: 150; Referee: Ole Gya

17 March 2018 Friendly	Viking	5–3	Fløy	Stavanger, Norway
14:00 CET (UTC+2)	Bringaker 7'; Høiland 11' (pen.), 21', 48' (pen.); Udo 87'; Salte (yellow card)	Report	Hallandvik 3', 32'; Østigård 45' (o.g.)	Stadium: Midjord kunstgress Attendance: 300

21 March 2018 Friendly	AaB (Denmark)	1–5	(Norway) Viking	Aalborg, Denmark
13:00 CET (UTC+2)	Børsting 7'	Report	Michalsen 26', 29'; Høiland 33', 60'; Danielsen 80'	Stadium: AaB Training Ground

24 March 2018 Friendly	Start	3–1	Viking	Kristiansand, Norway
15:00 CET (UTC+2)	Twum 23'; Børufsen 58'; Christensen 70'	Report	Udo 62'	Stadium: Sør Arena; Attendance: 856; Referee: Tore Hansen

27 March 2018 Friendly	Viking	2–6	Jerv	Stavanger, Norway
18:00 CET (UTC+2)	Thorstvedt 44'; Sale (yellow card) 57'; Martinsen (yellow card) 67'; Udo 89'	Report	Hagen 10', 21'; Lidberg 29', 52'; Khalili 79'; Andersen 90'	Stadium: Viking Stadion; Attendance: 1,200; Referee: Daniel Higraff

== Competitions ==
=== 1. divisjon ===
==== Table ====
Pos	Team	Pld	W	D	L	GF	GA	GD	Pts	Promotion, qualification or relegation
1	Viking (C, P)	30	20	1	9	68	44	+24	61	Promotion to Eliteserien
2	Mjøndalen (P)	30	17	9	4	49	24	+25	60	Promotion to Eliteserien
3	Aalesund	30	18	5	7	58	31	+27	59	Qualification for the promotion play-offs
4	Sogndal	30	15	6	9	47	31	+16	51	Qualification for the promotion play-offs
5	Ull/Kisa	30	11	10	9	59	49	+10	43	Qualification for the promotion play-offs

Source: nifs.no (in Norwegian), Soccerway
Rules for classification: 1) Points; 2) Goal difference; 3) Goals scored; 4) Head-to-head points; 5) Head-to-head goal difference; 6) Head-to-head away goals scored (only if between two teams); 7) Head-to-head goals scored; 8) Play-off (only used to decide champions or relegation).
(C) Champions; (P) Promoted

==== Results summary ====
Overall								Home						Away					
Pld	W	D	L	GF	GA	GD	Pts	W	D	L	GF	GA	GD	W	D	L	GF	GA	GD
30	20	1	9	68	44	+24	61	11	0	4	35	17	+18	9	1	5	33	27	+6

Last updated: 11 November 2018.
Source: see below

==== Results by round ====
Round	1	2	3	4	5	6	7	8	9	10	11	12	13	14	15	16	17	18	19	20	21	22	23	24	25	26	27	28	29	30
Ground	A	H	A	H	A	H	A	H	H	A	A	A	H	H	A	H	A	H	A	H	A	H	A	H	A	H	A	H	A	H
Result	W	L	W	W	W	W	D	W	L	L	L	L	W	W	W	W	W	L	W	W	L	W	W	W	L	L	W	W	W	W
Position	2	8	4	4	2	2	2	2	2	2	4	5	4	4	3	3	2	4	3	2	3	2	3	3	3	3	3	2	1	1

Source: see below
A = Away; H = Home; W = Win; D = Draw; L = Loss

==== Matches ====
Win Draw Loss

2 April 2018 1	Kongsvinger	0–2	Viking	Kongsvinger
18:00 CEST (UTC+2)	Skjellum (yellow card) 52'; Holter (yellow card) 78'; Castro (yellow card) 90'	Report	Høiland 6'; Østigård (yellow card) 19'; Vevatne 50'; Danielsen (yellow card) 74'; Martinsen (yellow card) 77'	Stadium: Gjemselund Stadion; Attendance: 1,851; Referee: Torkjell Jonsson Trædal

10 April 2018 2	Viking	0–2	Mjøndalen	Stavanger
19:00 CEST (UTC+2)	Wichne (yellow card) 72'	Report	Hansen 8'; Ibrahimaj 73'; Bojang (yellow card) 83'	Stadium: Viking Stadion; Attendance: 6,535; Referee: Bjørn Hansen

15 April 2018 3	Tromsdalen	0–2	Viking	Tromsdalen
18:00 CEST (UTC+2)	Johnsen (yellow card) 20'; Karlsen (yellow card) 69'; Vibe (red card) 78'	Report	Ryerson 55' (yellow card) 73'; Vevatne (yellow card) 74'; Thorstvedt (yellow card) 76'; Høiland 86'; Bytyqi (yellow card) 90+5'	Stadium: TUIL Arena; Attendance: 823; Referee: Mads Følstad Skarsem

22 April 2018 4	Viking	4–0	Åsane	Stavanger
18:00 CEST (UTC+2)	Danielsen (yellow card) 14'; Ernemann (yellow card) 30'; Tripić 45+2'; Høiland 52' (pen.); Kronberg 85'; Thorstvedt 88'	Report	Ueland (yellow card) 69'	Stadium: Viking Stadion; Attendance: 6,059; Referee: Christian Moen

29 April 2018 5	Ull/Kisa	4–5	Viking	Jessheim
15:00 CEST (UTC+2)	Normann Hansen 37'; Solberg 82', 84'; Nesset 90+1'; Garnås (yellow card) 90+2'	Report	Thorstvedt 12'; Vevatne (yellow card) 22'; Tripić 26', 45', 51'; Bytyqi 29'; Austbø (yellow card) 90+2'	Stadium: Jessheim Stadion; Attendance: 1,100; Referee: Bjørn Hansen

6 May 2018 6	Viking	3–1	Notodden	Stavanger
18:00 CEST (UTC+2)	Tripić 29'; Torsteinbø 43', 77'; Høiland (yellow card) 65'	Report	Hustad 31'; Akinyemi (yellow card) 62'	Stadium: Viking Stadion; Attendance: 6,824; Referee: Jan Morten Tennøy

13 May 2018 7	Levanger	0–0	Viking	Levanger
18:00 CEST (UTC+2)		Report	Ryerson (yellow card) 20'; Torsteinbø (yellow card) 84'	Stadium: Tobb Arena; Attendance: 1,027; Referee: Mohammed Usman Aslam

16 May 2018 8	Viking	5–2	Sandnes Ulf	Stavanger
18:00 CEST (UTC+2)	Torsteinbø 5'; Ryerson 13'; Høiland 15' (pen.), 31', 72'; Tripić (yellow card) 21'	Report	Heikkilä (yellow card) 14'; Kryger (yellow card) 32'; Danso 54', 66'	Stadium: Viking Stadion; Attendance: 15,835; Referee: Tom Harald Hagen

22 May 2018 9	Viking	0–2	Aalesund	Stavanger
19:00 CEST (UTC+2)	Tripić (yellow card) 29'; Østigård (yellow card) 40'; Ryerson (yellow card) 90+4'	Report	Friðjónsson 38'; Arnarson (yellow card) 42'; Fet 64'; Guèye (yellow card) 74'; Lie (yellow card) 90+3'	Stadium: Viking Stadion; Attendance: 7,483; Referee: Christian Moen

27 May 2018 10	Jerv	3–2	Viking	Grimstad
18:00 CEST (UTC+2)	Berglann 24'; Andersen 48'; Khalili 53'	Report	Tripić 52'; Udo 69'	Stadium: Levermyr Stadion; Attendance: 1,705; Referee: Bjørn Hansen

9 June 2018 11	Sogndal	1–0	Viking	Sogndalsfjøra
15:30 CEST (UTC+2)	Haugen 3' (yellow card) 45'; Wæhler (yellow card) 28'; Dyngeland (yellow card) 30'; Mandić (yellow card) 67'	Report	Høiland (yellow card) 30'; Kronberg (yellow card) 69'	Stadium: Fosshaugane Campus; Attendance: 2,205; Referee: Jan Morten Tennøy

16 June 2018 12	Nest-Sotra	5–0	Viking	Sotra
19:00 CEST (UTC+2)	Stephensen 7'; Furdal 29'; Liseth 35'; Sæthre 45'; Haugsdal (yellow card) 59'; Rødsand 87'	Report	Østigård (yellow card) 22'; Nakkim (yellow card) 38'	Stadium: Ågotnes Stadion; Attendance: 274; Referee: Tommy Skjerven

20 June 2018 13	Viking	2–1	Florø	Stavanger
18:00 CEST (UTC+2)	Høiland 42' (pen.); Vikstøl (yellow card) 52'; Torsteinbø 61'; Sale (yellow card) 86'	Report	Aase 15'	Stadium: Viking Stadion; Attendance: 6,043; Referee: Svein Tore Sinnes
Note: The match was supposed to be played 3 June, but was postponed due to Viking having 3 players on international duty.

24 June 2018 14	Viking	2–0	HamKam	Stavanger
15:00 CEST (UTC+2)	Høiland 48'; Danielsen 50'; Østigård (yellow card) 64'; Sale (yellow card) 84'; Ryerson (yellow card) 85'	Report	Jarosiński (red card) 9'; Egeris (yellow card) 57'	Stadium: Viking Stadion; Attendance: 6,302; Referee: Marius Hansen Grøtta

1 July 2018 15	Strømmen	1–6	Viking	Strømmen
15:00 CEST (UTC+2)	Jahr (yellow card) 45'; Mauritz-Hansen 81'; Ness (yellow card) 90+2'	Report	Thorstvedt 24', 56'; Martinsen (yellow card) 33'; Høiland 35', 83' (pen.), 90+2' (pen.); Sale 42'	Stadium: Strømmen Stadion; Attendance: 657; Referee: Mohammad Usman Aslam

22 July 2018 16	Viking	4–1	Jerv	Stavanger
18:00 CEST (UTC+2)	Ryerson 20'; Sale 33'; Danielsen 37'; Kronberg 66'; Thorstvedt (yellow card) 74'	Report	Berglann (yellow card) 13' (yellow-red card) 90'; Anthony 15'; Wembangomo (yellow card) 90'	Stadium: Viking Stadion; Attendance: 6,009; Referee: Mohammad Usman Aslam

31 July 2018 17	HamKam	2–3	Viking	Hamar
19:00 CEST (UTC+2)	Rønning 15'; Nordli 24'; Alegre (yellow card) 90'	Report	Vikstøl (yellow card) 25'; Thorstvedt 50', 54'; Kronberg 90'	Stadium: Briskeby Arena; Attendance: 1,947; Referee: Steinar Hauge

5 August 2018 18	Viking	2–3	Nest-Sotra	Stavanger
18:00 CEST (UTC+2)	Vikstøl 26' (yellow card) 49' (yellow-red card) 66'; Nakkim (yellow card) 45'; Salte (yellow card) 68'; Furdal 72'	Report	Dang 16', 57'; Nurkić (yellow card) 27'; Liseth 61'; Larsen (yellow card) 78'; Bjørlo (yellow card) 89'; Selvik (yellow card) 90'	Stadium: Viking Stadion; Attendance: 6,402; Referee: Mads Følstad Skarsem

12 August 2018 19	Åsane	1–2	Viking	Åsane
18:00 CEST (UTC+2)	Kristoffersen (yellow card) 63'; Fantoft 90'	Report	Ibrahimaj 15'; Thorstvedt 18'; Torsteinbø (yellow card) 90'	Stadium: Myrdal Stadion; Attendance: 641; Referee: Christian Moen

19 August 2018 20	Viking	2–0	Strømmen	Stavanger
18:00 CEST (UTC+2)	Høiland 29' (pen.), 59'; Thorstvedt (yellow card) 38'	Report	Blårud (yellow card) 23'; Jahr (yellow card) 77'	Stadium: Viking Stadion; Attendance: 6,730; Referee: Svein Tore Sinnes

25 August 2018 21	Sandnes Ulf	3–0	Viking	Sandnes
15:30 CEST (UTC+2)	Bogdanović 10'; Erlien 16'; Kapidžić 62'; Kryger (yellow card) 68'	Report	Vikstøl (yellow card) 73'	Stadium: Sandnes Stadion; Attendance: 4,364; Referee: Jan Morten Tennøy

2 September 2018 22	Viking	3–0	Levanger	Stavanger
18:00 CEST (UTC+2)	Tripić 20'; Furdal 48'; Ibrahimaj 54'	Report	Sandmæl (yellow card) 62'	Stadium: Viking Stadion; Attendance: 6,050; Referee: Magnus Nicolai Koløy

18 September 2018 23	Notodden	1–2	Viking	Notodden
19:00 CEST (UTC+2)	Mac-Intosch (yellow card) 70'; Salasiwa 77'	Report	Høiland 21'; Tripić (yellow card) 52'; Andrésson 88'	Stadium: Idrettsparken; Attendance: 1,373; Referee: Kim Rune Østerlie Borgersen

23 September 2018 24	Viking	2–0	Sogndal	Stavanger
15:00 CEST (UTC+2)	Ibrahimaj 43'; Thorstvedt 69'	Report	Haugen (yellow card) 19'	Stadium: Viking Stadion; Attendance: 7,559; Referee: Mischa Kellerhals

30 September 2018 25	Florø	3–2	Viking	Florø
15:00 CEST (UTC+2)	Javashvili (yellow card) 39'; Nakkim 58' (o.g.); Callaku 70'; Jeggo 77'	Report	Ibrahimaj (yellow card) 56'; Høiland 74', 82' (yellow card) 81'	Stadium: Florø Stadion; Attendance: 1,050; Referee: Sivert Øksnes Amland

7 October 2018 26	Viking	2–4	Tromsdalen	Stavanger
18:00 CEST (UTC+2)	Furdal 9' (yellow card) 43' (yellow-red card) 90'; Thorstvedt 22' (yellow card) 67'; Tripić (yellow card) 33'; Andrésson (yellow card) 63'	Report	Lysvoll 44' (yellow card) 45'; Bjørshol 55' (o.g.); Jenssen 64'; Ahamed 74'	Stadium: Viking Stadion; Attendance: 6,012; Referee: Marius Hansen Grøtta

23 October 2018 27	Aalesund	1–3	Viking	Ålesund
19:00 CEST (UTC+2)	Ramsteijn 74'; Grønner (yellow card) 74'	Report	Ernemann (yellow card) 32'; Andrésson (yellow card) 43'; Høiland 53', 61'; Austbø (yellow card) 74'; Østensen 83'	Stadium: Color Line Stadion; Attendance: 5,233; Referee: Mohammad Usman Aslam

28 October 2018 28	Viking	1–0	Ull/Kisa	Stavanger
15:00 CET (UTC+1)	Høiland 90'	Report	Walstad (yellow card) 10'	Stadium: Viking Stadion; Attendance: 8,756; Referee: Marius Lien

4 November 2018 29	Mjøndalen	2–4	Viking	Mjøndalen
12:00 CET (UTC+1)	Gauseth 7'; Johansen (yellow card) 50'; Nakkim 70' (o.g.); Hansen (yellow card) 80'	Report	Nakkim (yellow card) 6'; Vikstøl (yellow card) 9'; Høiland 54'; Bytyqi 57'; Furdal 68'; Østensen 80'	Stadium: Isachsen Stadion; Attendance: 3,630; Referee: Trond Ivar Døvle

11 November 2018 30	Viking	3–1	Kongsvinger	Stavanger
13:00 CET (UTC+1)	Furdal 22'; Høiland (yellow card) 56' (goal) 79'; Ibrahimaj (yellow card) 76'; Bytyqi 85' (yellow card) 85'	Report	Gorodovoy (yellow card) 11'; Ibrahim 31'; Gang (yellow card) 50' (yellow-red card) 73'; Pålerud (yellow card) 67'	Stadium: Viking Stadion; Attendance: 15,900; Referee: Christian Moen

=== Norwegian Cup ===
18 April 2018 First round	Madla	0–2	Viking	Stavanger
18:00 CEST (UTC+2)	Leiland (yellow card) 23'	Report	Høiland 2', 24'	Stadium: ISS Stadion; Attendance: 1,050; Referee: Daniel Higraff

2 May 2018 Second round	Bryne	1–0	Viking	Bryne
19:00 CEST (UTC+2)	Bøgild (yellow card) 56'; Skjørestad (yellow card) 62'; Ueland (yellow card) 78' el Ghaouti 88' (yellow card) 90'	Report	Thorstvedt (yellow card) 32'; Ernemann (yellow card) 82'	Stadium: Bryne Stadion; Attendance: 2,396; Referee: Steinar Hauge

== Squad statistics ==
As of match played 11 November 2018

=== Appearances and goals ===
No.	Pos	Nat	Player	Total		1. divisjon		Norwegian Cup	
No.	Pos	Nat	Player	Apps	Goals	Apps	Goals	Apps	Goals
1	GK	(Norway) NOR	Iven Austbø	18	0	18	0	0	0
2	DF	(Norway) NOR	Rasmus Martinsen	10	0	9	0	1	0
3	DF	(Norway) NOR	Viljar Vevatne	20	1	18	1	2	0
4	DF	(Norway) NOR	Tord Salte	17	0	15	0	2	0
5	DF	(Norway) NOR	Markus Nakkim	29	0	28	0	1	0
6	DF	(Iceland) ISL	Axel Andrésson	9	1	9	1	0	0
7	FW	(Norway) NOR	Zymer Bytyqi	21	3	19	3	2	0
9	MF	(Norway) NOR	Fredrik Torsteinbø	27	4	25	4	2	0
10	FW	(Norway) NOR	Tommy Høiland	32	23	30	21	2	2
11	FW	(Norway) NOR	Zlatko Tripić	26	7	25	7	1	0
12	GK	(Norway) NOR	Erik Arnebrott	0	0	0	0	0	0
14	MF	(Norway) NOR	André Danielsen	23	2	22	2	1	0
15	GK	(Norway) NOR	Amund Wichne	14	0	12	0	2	0
16	FW	(Norway) NOR	Even Østensen	10	2	10	2	0	0
17	MF	(Denmark) DEN	Steffen Ernemann	25	0	23	0	2	0
18	DF	(Norway) NOR	Sondre Bjørshol	9	0	9	0	0	0
19	DF	(Norway) NOR	Kristian Novak	0	0	0	0	0	0
20	FW	(Norway) NOR	Ylldren Ibrahimaj	11	3	11	3	0	0
21	MF	(Norway) NOR	Harald Nilsen Tangen	2	0	1	0	1	0
22	DF	(Denmark) DEN	Claes Kronberg	25	3	24	3	1	0
23	DF	(Norway) NOR	Rolf Daniel Vikstøl	17	1	17	1	0	0
24	MF	(Norway) NOR	Jonas Pereira	2	0	1	0	1	0
25	FW	(Nigeria) NGR	Usman Sale	14	2	13	2	1	0
27	MF	(Norway) NOR	Johnny Furdal	13	5	13	5	0	0
28	MF	(Norway) NOR	Kristian Thorstvedt	25	9	24	9	1	0
Players who left Viking during the season:
6	DF	(Norway) NOR	Leo Skiri Østigård	13	0	11	0	2	0
8	FW	(Nigeria) NGR	Aniekpeno Udo	5	1	5	1	0	0
18	MF	(Norway) NOR	Julian Ryerson	16	3	15	3	1	0
21	MF	(England) ENG	Jordan Hallam	6	0	5	0	1	0
26	MF	(Norway) NOR	Tore André Sørås	0	0	0	0	0	0
30	FW	(Norway) NOR	Stian Michalsen	8	0	7	0	1	0

=== Goal scorers ===
Place	Position	Nation	Name	1. divisjon	Norwegian Cup	Total
1	FW	(Norway)	Tommy Høiland	21	2	23
2	MF	(Norway)	Kristian Thorstvedt	9	0	9
3	FW	(Norway)	Zlatko Tripić	7	0	7
4	MF	(Norway)	Johnny Furdal	5	0	5
5	MF	(Norway)	Fredrik Torsteinbø	4	0	4
6	MF	(Norway)	Julian Ryerson	3	0	3
6	DF	(Denmark)	Claes Kronberg	3	0	3
6	FW	(Norway)	Ylldren Ibrahimaj	3	0	3
6	FW	(Norway)	Zymer Bytyqi	3	0	3
10	MF	(Norway)	André Danielsen	2	0	2
10	FW	(Nigeria)	Usman Sale	2	0	2
10	FW	(Norway)	Even Østensen	2	0	2
13	DF	(Norway)	Viljar Vevatne	1	0	1
13	FW	(Nigeria)	Aniekpeno Udo	1	0	1
13	DF	(Norway)	Rolf Daniel Vikstøl	1	0	1
13	DF	(Iceland)	Axel Andrésson	1	0	1
			TOTALS	68	2	70

=== Disciplinary record ===
Number	Position	Nation	Name	1. divisjon		Norwegian Cup		Total	
Number	Position	Nation	Name	Yellow card	Red card	Yellow card	Red card	Yellow card	Red card
1	GK	(Norway)	Iven Austbø	2	0	0	0	2	0
2	DF	(Norway)	Rasmus Martinsen	2	0	0	0	2	0
3	DF	(Norway)	Viljar Vevatne	2	0	0	0	2	0
4	DF	(Norway)	Tord Salte	1	0	0	0	1	0
5	DF	(Norway)	Markus Nakkim	3	0	0	0	3	0
6	DF	(Norway)	Leo Skiri Østigård	4	0	0	0	4	0
6	DF	(Iceland)	Axel Andrésson	2	0	0	0	2	0
7	FW	(Norway)	Zymer Bytyqi	2	0	0	0	2	0
9	MF	(Norway)	Fredrik Torsteinbø	2	0	0	0	2	0
10	FW	(Norway)	Tommy Høiland	4	0	0	0	4	0
11	FW	(Norway)	Zlatko Tripić	4	0	0	0	4	0
14	MF	(Norway)	André Danielsen	2	0	0	0	2	0
15	GK	(Norway)	Amund Wichne	1	0	0	0	1	0
17	MF	(Denmark)	Steffen Ernemann	2	0	1	0	3	0
18	MF	(Norway)	Julian Ryerson	4	0	0	0	4	0
20	FW	(Norway)	Ylldren Ibrahimaj	2	0	0	0	2	0
22	DF	(Denmark)	Claes Kronberg	1	0	0	0	1	0
23	DF	(Norway)	Rolf Daniel Vikstøl	4	1	0	0	4	1
25	FW	(Nigeria)	Usman Sale	2	0	0	0	2	0
27	MF	(Norway)	Johnny Furdal	1	1	0	0	1	1
28	MF	(Norway)	Kristian Thorstvedt	4	0	1	0	5	0
			TOTALS	51	2	2	0	53	2
