= 2019 Viking FK season =

Viking 2019 football season

Viking
2019 season
- Chair: Stig Christiansen
- Manager: Bjarne Berntsen
- Stadium: Viking Stadion
- Eliteserien: 5th
- Norwegian Cup: Winners
- Top goalscorer: League: Kristian Thorstvedt (10); All: Kristian Thorstvedt (13)
- Highest home attendance: 15,197 vs Ranheim (30 October, Norwegian Cup)
- Lowest home attendance: 3,469 vs Stabæk (26 June, Norwegian Cup)
- Average home league attendance: 8,933
Home colours	Away colours

The 2019 season was Viking's 1st year back in Eliteserien, after being promoted last season. It was the club's 69th season in the top flight of Norwegian football. The club participated in the Eliteserien and the Norwegian Cup.

== Squad ==
As of 4 September 2019

Note: Flags indicate national team as defined under FIFA eligibility rules; some limited exceptions apply. Players may hold more than one non-FIFA nationality.

No.	Pos.	Nation	Player
1	GK	NOR	Iven Austbø
3	DF	NOR	Viljar Vevatne (vice-captain)
4	DF	NOR	Tord Salte
5	DF	ISL	Axel Andrésson
6	DF	NOR	Runar Hove
7	FW	NOR	Zymer Bytyqi
8	MF	NOR	Johnny Furdal
9	MF	NOR	Fredrik Torsteinbø
10	FW	NOR	Tommy Høiland
11	FW	NOR	Zlatko Tripić (captain)
12	GK	NOR	Erik Arnebrott
14	MF	NOR	André Danielsen

No.	Pos.	Nation	Player
15	GK	NOR	Amund Wichne
16	FW	NOR	Even Østensen
18	DF	NOR	Sondre Bjørshol
19	FW	NOR	Jostein Ekeland
20	MF	KOS	Ylldren Ibrahimaj
21	MF	NOR	Harald Nilsen Tangen
23	DF	NOR	Rolf Daniel Vikstøl
24	MF	NOR	Kristoffer Løkberg
27	MF	ISL	Samúel Friðjónsson (on loan from Vålerenga)
28	MF	NOR	Kristian Thorstvedt
29	FW	FIN	Benjamin Källman (on loan from Inter Turku)
30	DF	NOR	Adrian Pereira

=== Out on loan ===
Note: Flags indicate national team as defined under FIFA eligibility rules; some limited exceptions apply. Players may hold more than one non-FIFA nationality.

No.	Pos.	Nation	Player
22	MF	NOR	Lasse Berg Johnsen (at Tromsdalen)

== Transfers ==
=== Transfers in ===
Date	Pos.	Name	From	Fee	Ref.
1 January 2019	DF	(Iceland) Axel Óskar Andrésson	(England) Reading	Undisclosed	
1 January 2019	DF	(Norway) Runar Hove	Florø	Undisclosed	
1 January 2019	DF	(Norway) Adrian Pereira	Promoted from junior squad		
1 January 2019	MF	(Norway) Lasse Berg Johnsen	Promoted from junior squad		
1 April 2019	FW	(Norway) Jostein Ekeland	Vidar	Undisclosed	
13 August 2019	MF	(Norway) Kristoffer Løkberg	Brann	Undisclosed	

=== Transfers out ===
Date	Pos.	Name	To	Fee	Ref.
1 January 2019	DF	(Denmark) Claes Kronberg	Released (Note: Joined Sandnes Ulf on 19 June 2019.)		
1 January 2019	DF	(Norway) Rasmus Martinsen	Released (Note: Joined Brodd on 6 April 2019.)		
1 January 2019	DF	(Norway) Kristian Novak	Released (Note: Joined Sola on 4 March 2019.)		
1 January 2019	MF	(Denmark) Steffen Ernemann	Released (Note: Joined Sogndal on 28 February 2019.)		
16 January 2019	MF	(Norway) Jonas Pereira	Fram Larvik	Free transfer	
9 October 2019	FW	(Nigeria) Usman Sale	Contract terminated (Note: Joined KuPS on 5 December 2019.)		

=== Loans in ===
Start date	Pos.	Name	From	End date	Ref.
30 January 2019	MF	(Iceland) Samúel Friðjónsson	Vålerenga	End of season	
31 July 2019	FW	(Finland) Benjamin Källman	(Finland) Inter Turku	End of season	

=== Loans out ===
Start date	Pos.	Name	To	End date	Ref.
29 May 2019	MF	(Norway) Harald Nilsen Tangen	Tromsdalen	5 August 2019	
29 May 2019	MF	(Norway) Lasse Berg Johnsen	Tromsdalen	End of season	
4 June 2019	GK	(Norway) Erik Arnebrott	Tromsdalen	5 August 2019	

== Friendlies ==
On 16 December 2018, Viking announced five friendly matches to be played in pre-season. Five more matches were announced a few weeks later.

On 31 May 2019, Viking announced two friendly matches to be played in June.

=== Pre-season ===
1 February 2019 Friendly	Viking	8–1	Sola	Stavanger, Norway
18:00 CET (UTC+2)	Thorstvedt 11', 12'; Tripić 22'; Bytyqi 34'; Høiland 54' (pen.); Haugen 63'; 67' (o.g.); Furdal 73'	Report	Eriksen 66'	Stadium: Viking Stadion; Attendance: 323; Referee: Mischa Kellerhals

7 February 2019 Friendly	Viking	2–3	Nest-Sotra	Randaberg, Norway
18:30 CET (UTC+2)	Høiland 49', 86'	Report	Dang 43', 45' (pen.), 68'	Stadium: Randaberg Arena; Attendance: 600; Referee: Daniel Higraff

13 February 2019 Friendly	Viking	5–1	Sandnes Ulf	Stavanger, Norway
18:00 CET (UTC+2)	Thorstvedt 15', 58', 77'; Bytyqi 47', 87'	Report	Berntsen 10'	Stadium: Viking Stadion; Attendance: 400; Referee: Mischa Kellerhals

18 February 2019 Friendly	Sandefjord	0–2	Viking	Marbella, Spain
13:00 CET (UTC+2)		Report	Tripić 52'; Høiland 67'	Stadium: Estadio Municipal de Marbella; Referee: Espen Eskås

21 February 2019 Friendly	Lokomotiv Moscow (Russia)	5–1	(Norway) Viking	Marbella, Spain
16:00 CET (UTC+2)	Eder 3'; Farfán 27'; Miranchuk 42', 55' (pen.); Kvaratskhelia 76'	Report	Pereira 39'	Stadium: Dama de Noche; Referee: Espen Eskås

1 March 2019 Friendly	Odd	1–1	Viking	Skien, Norway
14:00 CET (UTC+2)	Børven 75'	Report	Sale 17'	Stadium: Skagerak Arena; Referee: Rohit Saggi

9 March 2019 Friendly	Aalesund	2–2	Viking	Marbella, Spain
16:30 CET (UTC+2)	Friðjónsson 15' (pen.); Guèye 43'	Report	Ibrahimaj 78'; Høiland 90' (pen.)	Stadium: La Quinta; Referee: Christian Moen

12 March 2019 Friendly	Dynamo Brest (Belarus)	2–1	(Norway) Viking	Marbella, Spain
CET (UTC+2)	Nyakhaychyk 49'; Kislyak 68'	Report	Ibrahimaj 32'	Stadium: Dama de Noche; Referee: Svein Tore Sinnes

17 March 2019 Friendly	Viking	4–0	Egersund	Stavanger, Norway
18:00 CET (UTC+2)	González 30' (o.g.); Thorstvedt 69', 85'; Høiland 90' (pen.)	Report		Stadium: Viking Stadion; Referee: Daniel Higraff

24 March 2019 Friendly	Viking	4–0	Haugesund	Stavanger, Norway
18:00 CET (UTC+2)	Vevatne 19'; Tripić 39'; Ibrahimaj 45'; Bytyqi 90'	Report		Stadium: Viking Stadion; Referee: Tore Hansen

=== Mid-season ===
5 June 2019 Friendly	Viking	1–2	Start	Kvernaland, Norway
15:10 CEST (UTC+1)	Ekeland 66'	Report	Sigurðarson 9'; Finnbogason 26'	Stadium: Frøyland Stadion; Referee: Daniel Higraff

12 June 2019 Friendly	Staal Jørpeland	2–4	Viking	Jørpeland, Norway
18:00 CEST (UTC+1)	Ciach 29', 43'	Report	Furdal 35'; Høiland 36'; Ekeland 62'; Vikstøl 90'	Stadium: Jørpeland Stadion; Attendance: 600; Referee: Alexander Milovanovic

14 November 2019 Friendly	Viking	1–1	Start	Stavanger, Norway
15:00 CET (UTC+2)	Bytyqi 23'	Report	Markovic 15'	Stadium: Viking Stadion; Referee: Mischa Kellerhals

== Competitions ==
=== Eliteserien ===
==== Table ====
Pos	Team	Pld	W	D	L	GF	GA	GD	Pts	Qualification or relegation
3	Rosenborg	30	14	10	6	53	41	+12	52	Qualification for the Europa League first qualifying round
4	Odd	30	15	7	8	45	40	+5	52	
5	Viking	30	13	8	9	55	42	+13	47	Qualification for the Europa League second qualifying round (Note: Viking qualified for the Europa League second qualifying round as winners of the 2019 Norwegian Cup.)
6	Kristiansund	30	11	8	11	41	41	0	41	
7	Haugesund	30	9	13	8	44	37	+7	40	

Source: Football Association of Norway (in Norwegian), Soccerway
Rules for classification: 1) Points; 2) Goal difference; 3) Goals scored; 4) Head-to-head points; 5) Head-to-head goal difference; 6) Head-to-head away goals scored (only if between two teams); 7) Head-to-head goals scored; 8) Play-off (only used to decide champions or relegation).

==== Results summary ====
Overall								Home						Away					
Pld	W	D	L	GF	GA	GD	Pts	W	D	L	GF	GA	GD	W	D	L	GF	GA	GD
30	13	8	9	55	42	+13	47	9	4	2	32	15	+17	4	4	7	23	27	−4

Source: see below

==== Results by round ====
Round	1	2	3	4	5	6	7	8	9	10	11	12	13	14	15	16	17	18	19	20	21	22	23	24	25	26	27	28	29	30
Ground	H	A	H	A	A	H	A	H	A	A	H	A	H	A	H	A	H	H	H	A	H	A	H	A	H	A	H	A	H	A
Result	W	W	W	L	L	D	D	W	L	W	L	D	D	L	L	L	W	W	D	D	W	W	W	D	W	L	W	L	D	W
Position	1	1	1	3	5	5	6	6	7	7	7	6	8	9	9	10	8	7	8	8	7	5	5	5	5	5	5	5	5	5

Source: nifs.no
A = Away; H = Home; W = Win; D = Draw; L = Loss

==== Matches ====
The Eliteserien fixtures were announced on 19 December 2018.

31 March 2019 1	Viking	2–0	Kristiansund	Stavanger
18:00 CEST (UTC+2)	Bytyqi 34'; Tripić 46'	Report		Stadium: Viking Stadion; Attendance: 10,059; Referee: Rohit Saggi

7 April 2019 2	Tromsø	0–2	Viking	Tromsø
18:00 CEST (UTC+2)		Report	Thorstvedt 8', 90+7'	Stadium: Alfheim Stadion; Attendance: 2,888; Referee: Kristoffer Hagenes

13 April 2019 3	Viking	2–1	Brann	Stavanger
20:00 CEST (UTC+2)	Thorstvedt 64'; Ibrahimaj 79'	Report	Haugen 85'	Stadium: Viking Stadion; Attendance: 13,029; Referee: Ola Hobber Nilsen

23 April 2019 4	Odd	1–0	Viking	Skien
19:00 CEST (UTC+2)	Kaasa 54'	Report		Stadium: Skagerak Arena; Attendance: 4,775; Referee: Tom Harald Hagen

28 April 2019 5	Ranheim	5–2	Viking	Trondheim
18:00 CEST (UTC+2)	Reginiussen 9'; Solbakken 52', 90+3'; Storflor 74'; Karlsen 90'	Report	Ibrahimaj 51'; Høiland 66' (pen.)	Stadium: EXTRA Arena; Attendance: 1,950; Referee: Rohit Saggi

6 May 2019 6	Viking	1–1	Vålerenga	Stavanger
19:00 CEST (UTC+2)	Høiland 71'	Report	Ejuke 69'	Stadium: Viking Stadion; Attendance: 7,659; Referee: Tommy Skjerven

13 May 2019 7	Strømsgodset	0–0	Viking	Drammen
19:00 CEST (UTC+2)		Report		Stadium: Marienlyst Stadion; Attendance: 4,576; Referee: Sigurd Smehus Kringstad

16 May 2019 8	Viking	3–0	Stabæk	Stavanger
18:00 CEST (UTC+2)	Thorstvedt 47'; Høiland 60' (pen.); Bytyqi 65'	Report		Stadium: Viking Stadion; Attendance: 15,029; Referee: Tore Hansen

20 May 2019 9	Molde	5–1	Viking	Molde
19:00 CEST (UTC+2)	Moström 10'; Omoijuanfo 39', 49' (pen.), 71'; Bjørshol 82' (o.g.)	Report	Høiland 36'	Stadium: Aker Stadion; Attendance: 6,108; Referee: Kristoffer Hagenes

16 June 2019 10	Lillestrøm	0–2	Viking	Lillestrøm
18:00 CEST (UTC+2)		Report	Thorstvedt 44'; Vevatne 78'	Stadium: Åråsen Stadion; Attendance: 5,676; Referee: Dag Vidar Hafsås

23 June 2019 11	Viking	3–4	Bodø/Glimt	Stavanger
18:00 CEST (UTC+2)	Thorstvedt 37'; Sale 70'; Hove 90+3'	Report	Bjørkan 18'; Herrem 28'; Layouni 50'; Zinckernagel 66'	Stadium: Viking Stadion; Attendance: 8,203; Referee: Tore Hansen

30 June 2019 12	Mjøndalen	1–1	Viking	Mjøndalen
18:00 CEST (UTC+2)	Scriven 54'	Report	Høiland 38'	Stadium: Consto Arena; Attendance: 2,550; Referee: Kai Erik Steen

5 July 2019 13	Viking	0–0	Haugesund	Stavanger
21:00 CEST (UTC+2)		Report		Stadium: Viking Stadion; Attendance: 8,169; Referee: Espen Eskås

13 July 2019 14	Rosenborg	5–1	Viking	Trondheim
15:30 CEST (UTC+2)	Hedenstad 36'; Søderlund 40', 76'; Konradsen 50', 84'	Report	Ekeland 44'	Stadium: Lerkendal Stadion; Attendance: 12,659; Referee: Ola Hobber Nilsen

4 August 2019 15	Viking	0–2	Molde	Stavanger
18:00 CEST (UTC+2)		Report	James 82'; Eikrem 86'	Stadium: Viking Stadion; Attendance: 7,069; Referee: Tom Harald Hagen

11 August 2019 16	Bodø/Glimt	2–1	Viking	Bodø
18:00 CEST (UTC+2)	Zinckernagel 2'; Evjen 32'	Report	Tripić 51'	Stadium: Aspmyra Stadion; Attendance: 3,567; Referee: Trond Ivar Døvle

14 August 2019 17	Viking	2–1	Sarpsborg 08	Stavanger
19:00 CEST (UTC+2)	Tripić 50'; Høiland 88' (pen.)	Report	Straalman 72'	Stadium: Viking Stadion; Attendance: 7,020; Referee: Sigurd Smehus Kringstad
Note: The match was supposed to be played 27 May, but was postponed due to Viking having 2 players at the U-20 World Cup.

18 August 2019 18	Viking	4–0	Strømsgodset	Stavanger
20:00 CEST (UTC+2)	Torsteinbø 7'; Høiland 37' (pen.), 77'; Pereira 83'	Report		Stadium: Viking Stadion; Attendance: 6,822; Referee: Kristoffer Hagenes

25 August 2019 19	Viking	2–2	Ranheim	Stavanger
18:00 CEST (UTC+2)	Thorstvedt 48', 57'	Report	Solbakken 84'; Bakenga 87'	Stadium: Viking Stadion; Attendance: 8,135; Referee: Tore Hansen

1 September 2019 20	Sarpsborg 08	2–2	Viking	Sarpsborg
18:00 CEST (UTC+2)	Ødegaard 38'; Mos 56'	Report	Høiland 85'; Østensen 90'	Stadium: Sarpsborg Stadion; Attendance: 5,366; Referee: Kai Erik Steen

15 September 2019 21	Viking	2–0	Odd	Stavanger
18:00 CEST (UTC+2)	Tripić 9'; Torsteinbø 51'	Report		Stadium: Viking Stadion; Attendance: 7,519; Referee: Tommy Skjerven

22 September 2019 22	Vålerenga	0–4	Viking	Oslo
18:00 CEST (UTC+2)		Report	Østensen 5', 23'; Pereira 75'; Källman 79'	Stadium: Intility Arena; Attendance: 7,056; Referee: Kristoffer Hagenes

30 September 2019 23	Viking	4–1	Mjøndalen	Stavanger
19:00 CEST (UTC+2)	Østensen 31'; Källman 58'; Hove 70'; Furdal 80'	Report	Johansen 5'	Stadium: Viking Stadion; Attendance: 6,500; Referee: Dag Vidar Hafsås

6 October 2019 24	Stabæk	0–0	Viking	Bærum
18:00 CEST (UTC+2)		Report		Stadium: Nadderud Stadion; Attendance: 3,127; Referee: Sigurd Smehus Kringstad

20 October 2019 25	Viking	2–1	Tromsø	Stavanger
18:00 CEST (UTC+2)	Friðjónsson 26'; Torsteinbø 89'	Report	Gundersen 90+3'	Stadium: Viking Stadion; Attendance: 8,212; Referee: Rohit Saggi

27 October 2019 26	Kristiansund	4–2	Viking	Kristiansund
18:00 CET (UTC+1)	Pellegrino 43', 59', 63'; Sørli 90+4'	Report	Torsteinbø 49'; Vikstøl 73'	Stadium: Kristiansund Stadion; Attendance: 4,301; Referee: Tore Hansen

3 November 2019 27	Viking	3–0	Lillestrøm	Stavanger
18:00 CET (UTC+1)	Ibrahimaj 14'; Torsteinbø 39'; Tripić 66' (pen.)	Report		Stadium: Viking Stadion; Attendance: 7,037; Referee: Kristoffer Hagenes

9 November 2019 28	Haugesund	1–0	Viking	Haugesund
18:00 CET (UTC+1)	Sandberg 80' (pen.)	Report		Stadium: Haugesund Stadion; Attendance: 5,742; Referee: Ola Hobber Nilsen

24 November 2019 29	Viking	2–2	Rosenborg	Stavanger
18:00 CET (UTC+1)	Furdal 14'; Källman 42'	Report	Akintola 36'; Søderlund 52'	Stadium: Viking Stadion; Attendance: 13,540; Referee: Tore Hansen

1 December 2019 30	Brann	1–5	Viking	Bergen
18:00 CET (UTC+1)	Haugen 8'	Report	Thorstvedt 16', 72'; Furdal 39'; Ibrahimaj 66'; Friðjónsson 90+3'	Stadium: Brann Stadion; Attendance: 14,490; Referee: Dag Vidar Hafsås

=== Norwegian Cup ===
2 May 2019 First round	Frøyland	1–3	Viking	Kvernaland
18:00 CEST (UTC+2)	Karlson 39'	Report	Bytyqi 55', 63'; Thorstvedt 70'	Stadium: Frøyland Stadion; Attendance: 1,030; Referee: Mischa Kellerhals

23 May 2019 Second round	Hinna	1–4	Viking	Stavanger
18:00 CEST (UTC+2)	Aano 47'	Report	Friðjónsson 19', 36'; Tripić 28', 81'	Stadium: Wintershallbanen; Attendance: 1,400; Referee: Daniel Higraff

19 June 2019 Third round	Sandnes Ulf	1–2	Viking	Sandnes
18:00 CEST (UTC+2)	Kapidžić 90+1' (pen.)	Report	Høiland 46'; Ibrahimaj 58'	Stadium: Sandnes Stadion; Attendance: 2,450; Referee: Kai Erik Steen

26 June 2019 Fourth round	Viking	5–2	Stabæk	Stavanger
18:00 CEST (UTC+2)	Furdal 8'; Vikstøl 21'; Østensen 23'; Thorstvedt 84'; Høiland 86'	Report	Gyasi 10'; Braaten 18'	Stadium: Viking Stadion; Attendance: 3,469; Referee: Rohit Saggi

26 September 2019 Quarter-final	Aalesund	1–1 (a.e.t.) (3–5 p)	Viking	Ålesund
20:00 CEST (UTC+2)	Castro 11' (pen.)	Report	Torsteinbø 40'	Stadium: Color Line Stadion; Attendance: 5,829; Referee: Kai Erik Steen
	Penalties
	(penalty scored) Castro; (penalty scored) Lie; (penalty missed) Steen Sæthre; (penalty scored) Azofeifa		Høiland (penalty scored); Østensen (penalty scored); Pereira (penalty scored); Friðjónsson (penalty scored); Tripić (penalty scored)

30 October 2019 Semi-final	Viking	3–0	Ranheim	Stavanger
20:00 CET (UTC+1)	Thorstvedt 8'; Ibrahimaj 38'; Källman 52'	Report		Stadium: Viking Stadion; Attendance: 15,197; Referee: Trond Ivar Døvle

8 December 2019 Final	Haugesund	0–1	Viking	Oslo
13:15 CET (UTC+1)		Report	Tripić 51' (pen.)	Stadium: Ullevaal Stadion; Attendance: 21,895; Referee: Espen Eskås

== Squad statistics ==
As of match played 8 December 2019

=== Appearances and goals ===
No.	Pos	Nat	Player	Total		Eliteserien		Norwegian Cup	
No.	Pos	Nat	Player	Apps	Goals	Apps	Goals	Apps	Goals
1	GK	(Norway) NOR	Iven Austbø	35	0	29	0	6	0
3	DF	(Norway) NOR	Viljar Vevatne	36	1	29	1	7	0
4	DF	(Norway) NOR	Tord Salte	21	0	18	0	3	0
5	DF	(Iceland) ISL	Axel Andrésson	1	0	1	0	0	0
6	DF	(Norway) NOR	Runar Hove	24	2	20	2	4	0
7	FW	(Norway) NOR	Zymer Bytyqi	34	4	28	2	6	2
8	MF	(Norway) NOR	Johnny Furdal	19	4	15	3	4	1
9	MF	(Norway) NOR	Fredrik Torsteinbø	30	6	23	5	7	1
10	FW	(Norway) NOR	Tommy Høiland	27	11	22	9	5	2
11	FW	(Norway) NOR	Zlatko Tripić	30	8	24	5	6	3
12	GK	(Norway) NOR	Erik Arnebrott	1	0	0	0	1	0
14	MF	(Norway) NOR	André Danielsen	10	0	9	0	1	0
15	GK	(Norway) NOR	Amund Wichne	4	0	3	0	1	0
16	FW	(Norway) NOR	Even Østensen	19	5	15	4	4	1
18	DF	(Norway) NOR	Sondre Bjørshol	28	0	22	0	6	0
19	FW	(Norway) NOR	Jostein Ekeland	13	1	11	1	2	0
20	MF	(Kosovo) KOS	Ylldren Ibrahimaj	35	6	28	4	7	2
21	MF	(Norway) NOR	Harald Nilsen Tangen	1	0	1	0	0	0
23	DF	(Norway) NOR	Rolf Daniel Vikstøl	20	2	16	1	4	1
24	MF	(Norway) NOR	Kristoffer Løkberg	15	0	12	0	3	0
27	MF	(Iceland) ISL	Samúel Friðjónsson	33	4	28	2	5	2
28	MF	(Norway) NOR	Kristian Thorstvedt	32	13	26	10	6	3
29	FW	(Finland) FIN	Benjamin Källman	13	4	11	3	2	1
30	DF	(Norway) NOR	Adrian Pereira	22	2	17	2	5	0
Players who left Viking during the season:
22	MF	(Norway) NOR	Lasse Berg Johnsen	3	0	2	0	1	0
25	FW	(Nigeria) NGR	Usman Sale	12	1	9	1	3	0

=== Goal scorers ===
Rank	Pos.	Nat.	Player	Eliteserien	Norwegian Cup	Total
1	MF	(Norway)	Kristian Thorstvedt	10	3	13
2	FW	(Norway)	Tommy Høiland	9	2	11
3	FW	(Norway)	Zlatko Tripić	5	3	8
4	MF	(Norway)	Fredrik Torsteinbø	5	1	6
4	MF	(Kosovo)	Ylldren Ibrahimaj	4	2	6
6	FW	(Norway)	Even Østensen	4	1	5
7	FW	(Finland)	Benjamin Källman	3	1	4
7	MF	(Norway)	Johnny Furdal	3	1	4
7	MF	(Iceland)	Samúel Friðjónsson	2	2	4
7	FW	(Norway)	Zymer Bytyqi	2	2	4
11	DF	(Norway)	Adrian Pereira	2	0	2
11	DF	(Norway)	Runar Hove	2	0	2
11	DF	(Norway)	Rolf Daniel Vikstøl	1	1	2
14	DF	(Norway)	Viljar Vevatne	1	0	1
14	FW	(Nigeria)	Usman Sale	1	0	1
14	FW	(Norway)	Jostein Ekeland	1	0	1
TOTALS				55	19	74
