= Aniekpeno =

Nigerian unisex given name

Origin
- Language: Ibibio
- Origin: Nigerian
- Meaning: Who would have given me
- Region of origin: South-south Nigeria

Other names
- Derivative: Anie

Aniekpeno is a Nigerian unisex given name and surname of Ibibio origin which means "Who would have given me?"

== Notable people with the name ==
- Aniekpeno Udo (born 1996), Nigerian footballer
