= Ylldren Ibrahimaj =

Kosovan-Norwegian footballer (born 1995)

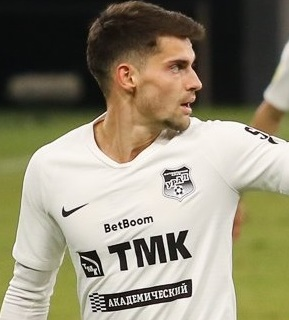
- Ibrahimaj with Ural Yekaterinburg in 2021

Personal information
- Date of birth: 24 December 1995 (age 30)
- Place of birth: Arendal, Norway
- Height: 1.78 m (5 ft 10 in)
- Position: Winger

Team information
- Current team: Lillestrøm
- Number: 29

Youth career
- –2011: IK Grane

Senior career*
Years	Team	Apps	(Gls)
2012–2017	Arendal	129	(14)
2018	Mjøndalen	15	(1)
2018–2020	Viking	68	(14)
2021–2022	Ural Yekaterinburg	9	(0)
2022–2024	Lillestrøm	83	(7)
2025	Mladá Boleslav	10	(0)
2025	HamKam	10	(3)
2026–	Lillestrøm	13	(0)

International career^{‡}
2020	Kosovo	1	(0)
- * Club domestic league appearances and goals as of 23 July 2026 ‡ National team caps and goals as of 12 January 2020

Ylldren Ibrahimaj (born 24 December 1995) is a professional footballer who plays for Norwegian club Lillestrøm. His primary position is a winger, but he can also play as an attacking or central midfielder. Born in Norway, Ibrahimaj represents Kosovo internationally.

== Club career ==
=== Early career and Mjøndalen ===
Ibrahimaj was part of the youth team of IK Grane until December 2011. From 2012, he played for the club of his birthplace, Arendal for five years and made 129 league appearances and scored fourteen goals.

On 22 December 2017, Ibrahimaj signed a four-year contract with 1. divisjon club Mjøndalen. On 2 April 2018, he made his debut against Florø after being named in the starting line-up and scored his side's only goal during a 1–1 home draw.

=== Viking ===
On 20 July 2018, Ibrahimaj joined 1. divisjon side Viking, on a two-and-a-half-year contract. Two days later, he made his debut in a 4–1 home win against Jerv after coming on as a substitute at 77th minute in place of Usman Sale.

=== Ural Yekaterinburg ===
On 16 January 2021, Ibrahimaj signed a three-year contract with Russian Premier League club Ural Yekaterinburg and received squad number 17. On 28 February 2021, he made his debut in a 2–2 away draw against Krasnodar after being named in the starting line-up.

=== Lillestrøm ===
On 7 February 2022, Ibrahimaj signed a three-year contract with Eliteserien club Lillestrøm and received squad number 20.

=== Mladá Boleslav ===
On 29 January 2025, Ibrahimaj signed a contract with Czech First League club Mladá Boleslav as a free agent.

=== Back in Lillestrøm ===
On 5 January 2026, Lillestrøm announced the signing of Ibrahimaj on a two-year contract.

== International career ==
On 22 May 2019, Ibrahimaj received a call-up from Kosovo for the UEFA Euro 2020 qualifying matches against Montenegro and Bulgaria, but he was not available for these matches after FIFA did not permit him to play for Kosovo due to problems with his documentation. His debut with Kosovo came on 13 January 2020 in a friendly match against Sweden after being named in the starting line-up.

== Career statistics ==
=== Club ===
As of match played 19 October 2025

Appearances and goals by club, season and competition
Club	Season	League			Cup		Continental		Total	
Club	Season	Division	Apps	Goals	Apps	Goals	Apps	Goals	Apps	Goals
Arendal	2012	3. divisjon	4	0	1	0	—		5	0
Arendal	2013	2. divisjon	24	1	1	0	—		25	1
Arendal	2014	2. divisjon	24	1	2	0	—		26	1
Arendal	2015	2. divisjon	24	2	3	1	—		27	3
Arendal	2016	2. divisjon	25	8	1	0	—		26	8
Arendal	2017	1. divisjon	28	2	2	3	—		30	5
Arendal	Total		129	14	10	4	—		139	18
Mjøndalen	2018	1. divisjon	15	1	3	1	—		18	2
Viking	2018	1. divisjon	11	3	0	0	—		11	3
Viking	2019	Eliteserien	28	4	7	2	—		35	6
Viking	2020	Eliteserien	29	7	—		1 (Note: Appearance in UEFA Europa League)	0	30	7
Viking	Total		68	14	7	2	1	0	76	16
Ural Yekaterinburg	2020–21	Russian Premier League	6	0	1	0	—		7	0
Ural Yekaterinburg	2021–22	Russian Premier League	3	0	1	0	—		4	0
Ural Yekaterinburg	Total		9	0	2	0	—		11	0
Lillestrøm	2022	Eliteserien	30	4	5	0	—		35	4
Lillestrøm	2023	Eliteserien	29	2	5	0	—		34	2
Lillestrøm	2024	Eliteserien	24	1	5	0	—		29	1
Lillestrøm	Total		83	7	15	0	—		98	7
Mladá Boleslav	2024–25	Czech First League	10	0	1	0	—		11	0
Mladá Boleslav	Total		10	0	1	0	—		11	0
HamKam	2025	Eliteserien	5	3	0	0	—		5	3
HamKam	Total		5	3	0	0	—		5	3
Career total			319	39	38	7	1	0	358	46

=== International ===
As of 13 January 2020

Appearances and goals by national team and year
National team	Year	Apps	Goals
Kosovo	2020	1	0
Total		1	0

== Honours ==
Viking

- 1. divisjon: 2018
- Norwegian Cup: 2019

Individual

- Eliteserien Top assist provider: 2019
