= Viking Stadion =

Football stadium in Stavanger, Norway

Coordinates: 58°54′53″N 05°43′50″E

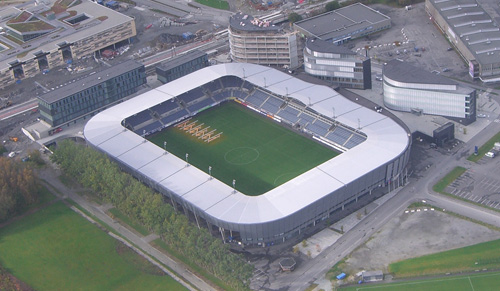
- Viking Stadion in 2006
- Interactive map of Viking Stadion
- Location: Jåttåvågen, Stavanger
- Owner: Viking Fotball AS
- Operator: Viking FK
- Capacity: 15,900
- Surface: Natural grass (2004–2017); Artificial turf (2018–)
- Record attendance: 16,600 vs Brann (24 June 2007)
- Field size: 105 m × 68 m (115 yd × 74 yd)

Construction
- Groundbreaking: April 2003
- Opened: 1 May 2004
- Cost: €20 million
- Architect: LINK signatur AS / NBBJ Design

Tenant
- Viking FK (2004–present)

Viking Stadion, currently named Lyse Arena for sponsorship reasons, is a football stadium in Stavanger, Norway. It was inaugurated in May 2004 and cost 160 million NOK (€20 million) to build. 50 million NOK, plus the lot it was built on, was a gift from the municipality. It replaced Stavanger Stadion as the home stadium of Viking FK.

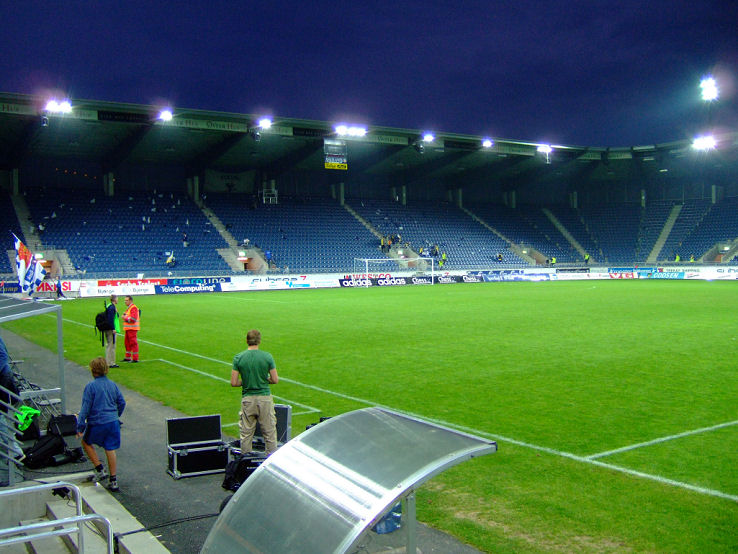
Viking Stadion 17 September 2006

In 2006, the stadium was expanded beyond the original capacity of 15,300 to 16,600. The capacity was later reduced to 16,300 in 2012 to make room for two giant screens. From 2018 the capacity is again reduced to 15,900.

Originally an all-seater stadium, parts of the west stand have been converted to safe standing in recent years.

The record attendance is 16,600 from 24 June 2007, when Viking met Brann.

Jåttåvågen railway station, which serves the Jæren Commuter Rail, is located right outside the stadium.

The venue has hosted the Norway national under-21 football team on four occasions, playing 1–0 against Spain on 31 May 2006, 1–1 against Bosnia and Herzegovina on 6 September 2006, 2–2 against Slovakia on 10 June 2009 and 2–2 against Belgium on 10 November 2011.

In a 2012 survey carried out by the Norwegian Players' Association among away-team captains, Viking Stadion was found to be the league's fourth-best stadium, with a score of 4.27 on a scale from one to five.

In 2015, it was decided to replace the natural grass surface of the stadium with artificial grass. The new surface was installed in March 2018.

In April 2018, the stadium was renamed SR-Bank Arena following a sponsorship deal with SpareBank 1 SR-Bank.

In January 2025, Lyse AS acquired the naming rights of the stadium for a five-year period and renamed the stadium Lyse Arena.

The stadium can also host large music concerts and events. Among the artists who have played at Viking Stadion are Bryan Adams, R.E.M., Roger Waters, Bob Dylan, Sissel Kyrkjebø & Plácido Domingo, The Eagles, Kiss, Robbie Williams, Ylvis, Bon Jovi and Iron Maiden.

== Attendance ==
Eliteserien
1. divisjon

League attendance
Season	Avg	Low	High	Ref
2004	12,450	10,041	15,300	
2005	13,699	11,967	15,231	
2006	13,910	11,351	16,251	
2007	15,842	13,808	16,600	
2008	15,377	14,439	16,500	
2009	13,071	11,374	15,328	
2010	11,529	9,939	14,283	
2011	10,255	8,898	12,584	
2012	9,894	7,541	13,443	
2013	10,284	8,525	13,218	
2014	10,014	7,730	16,508	
2015	10,272	7,086	14,463	
2016	8,813	7,069	11,347	
2017	7,380	6,157	9,838	
2018	7,900	6,009	15,900	
2019	8,933	6,500	15,029	
2020 (Note: The 2020 and 2021 seasons were affected by the COVID-19 pandemic.)	333	200	600	
2021	6,041	600	14,105	
2022	9,910	7,136	15,500	
2023	12,923	9,477	15,900	
2024	12,364	10,024	15,900	
2025	13,731	9,644	15,900	

== Future expansion ==
In 2009, Viking planned a further permanent expansion of the stadium. By adding a new upper tier to the south and east stands, the capacity would be increased to 22,000. The plan was to have the expansion completed by 2016.

A decline in Viking's attendances did not deter plans in 2010. Local politicians were skeptical about the expansion, but decided to commence a formal planning process. By 2012, a continuing decline in attendances had made it obvious that the plans were not immediately viable.
