= Tommy Høiland =

Norwegian footballer (born 1989)

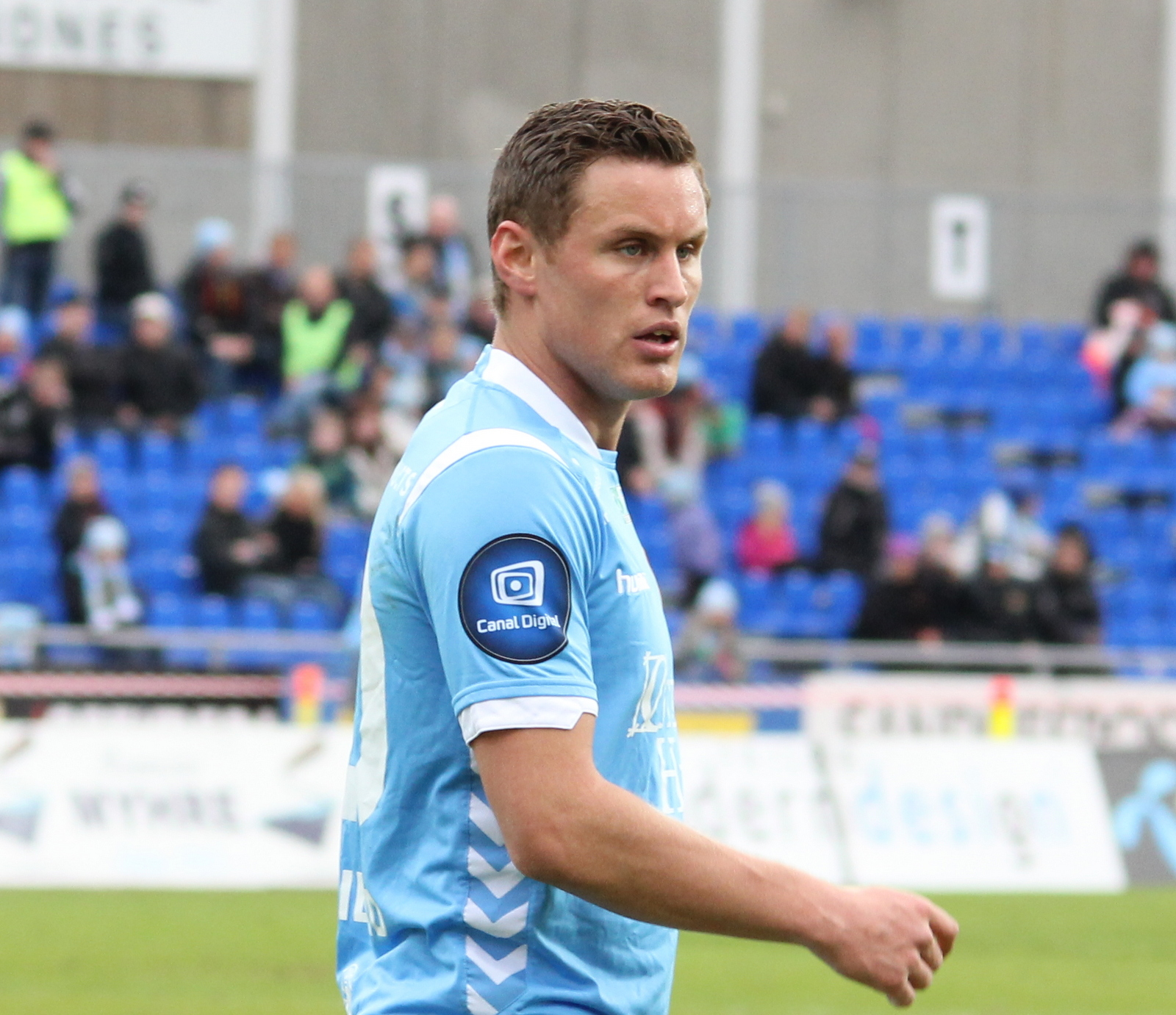
- Høiland with Sandnes Ulf in 2013

Personal information
- Full name: Tommy Høiland
- Date of birth: 11 April 1989 (age 37)
- Place of birth: Bryne, Norway
- Height: 1.78 m (5 ft 10 in)
- Position: Striker

Team information
- Current team: Sandnes Ulf
- Number: 10

Senior career*
Years	Team	Apps	(Gls)
2005–2007	Bryne	24	(4)
2008–2010	Viking	44	(4)
2011	Bryne	19	(7)
2012–2013	Sandnes Ulf	40	(8)
2013–2015	Molde	41	(15)
2014	→ Lillestrøm (loan)	13	(3)
2016–2017	Strømsgodset	27	(4)
2017–2021	Viking	99	(34)
2022–2024	Sandnes Ulf	74	(25)

International career
2003–2004	Norway U15	7	(4)
2005	Norway U16	8	(5)
2006	Norway U17	2	(2)
2007	Norway U18	6	(1)
2008	Norway U19	2	(0)
2008–2010	Norway U21	3	(0)
- * Club domestic league appearances and goals as of 14 November 2024

Tommy Høiland (born 11 April 1989) is a Norwegian former professional footballer who played as a striker, most recently for Sandnes Ulf.

== Career ==
Høiland started his career at Bryne before moving to Viking, returning to Bryne and then Sandnes Ulf.

On 10 July 2013 Høiland moved to Molde but less than a year later, on 31 March 2014, Høiland joined Lillestrøm on a season-long loan. Høiland's loan deal was ended early by Lillestrøm, seeing him return to Molde in July.

On 18 February 2016, he signed a three-season contract with Strømsgodset.

On 21 June 2017, he returned to his former club Viking, signing a three-year contract. On 13 February 2020, his contract was extended until the end of the 2022 season. On 17 December 2021, he signed a two-year contract with Sandnes Ulf, whom he played for between 2012 and 2013.

== International career ==
Høiland has represented Norway from under-15 to under-21 level.

== Career statistics ==
=== Club ===
As of match played 8 October 2023

Appearances and goals by club, season and competition
Club	Season	League			National Cup		Continental		Other		Total	
Club	Season	Division	Apps	Goals	Apps	Goals	Apps	Goals	Apps	Goals	Apps	Goals
Bryne	2005	1. divisjon	1	1	0	0	—		—		1	1
Bryne	2006	1. divisjon	4	2	0	0	—		—		4	2
Bryne	2007	1. divisjon	19	1	1	1	—		—		20	2
Bryne	Total		24	4	1	1	—		—		25	5
Viking	2008	Eliteserien	3	1	3	1	0	0	—		6	2
Viking	2009	Eliteserien	21	0	3	1	—		—		24	1
Viking	2010	Eliteserien	20	3	5	3	—		—		25	6
Viking	Total		44	4	11	5	0	0	—		55	9
Bryne	2011	1. divisjon	19	7	1	0	—		—		20	7
Sandnes Ulf	2012	Eliteserien	25	3	1	0	—		2 (Note: Appearance(s) in Eliteserien play-offs)	1	28	4
Sandnes Ulf	2013	Eliteserien	15	5	1	0	—		—		16	5
Sandnes Ulf	Total		40	8	2	0	—		2	1	44	9
Molde	2013	Eliteserien	9	1	2	1	1 (Note: Appearance in UEFA Champions League)	0	—		12	2
Molde	2014	Eliteserien	9	5	3	0	3 (Note: Appearance(s) in UEFA Europa League)	0	—		15	5
Molde	2015	Eliteserien	23	9	5	2	7 (Note: Two appearances in UEFA Champions League, five appearances and two goals in UEFA Europa League)	2	—		35	13
Molde	Total		41	15	10	3	11	2	—		62	20
Lillestrøm (loan)	2014	Eliteserien	13	3	4	4	—		—		17	7
Strømsgodset	2016	Eliteserien	22	4	5	1	0	0	—		27	5
Strømsgodset	2017	Eliteserien	5	0	1	0	—		—		6	0
Strømsgodset	Total		27	4	6	1	0	0	—		33	5
Viking	2017	Eliteserien	13	4	0	0	—		—		13	4
Viking	2018	1. divisjon	30	21	2	2	—		—		32	23
Viking	2019	Eliteserien	22	8	5	2	—		—		27	10
Viking	2020	Eliteserien	26	1	—		1	0	—		27	1
Viking	2021	Eliteserien	8	0	1	0	—		—		9	0
Viking	Total		99	34	8	4	1	0	—		108	38
Sandnes Ulf	2022	1. divisjon	22	3	3	1	—		1	0	26	4
Sandnes Ulf	2023	1. divisjon	23	12	2	1	—		—		25	13
Sandnes Ulf	Total		45	15	5	2	—		1	0	51	17
Career total			352	94	48	20	12	2	3	1	415	117

== Honours ==
=== Club ===
Molde

- Eliteserien: 2014
- Norwegian Football Cup: 2013, 2014

Viking

- Norwegian First Division: 2018
- Norwegian Football Cup: 2019

=== Individual ===
- Norwegian First Division top scorer: 2018
