= Usman Sale =

Nigerian footballer

Personal information
- Full name: Usman Sani Hassan Sale
- Date of birth: 27 August 1995 (age 31)
- Place of birth: Jos, Nigeria
- Height: 1.79 m (5 ft 10 in)
- Position: Winger

Team information
- Current team: Duhok

Senior career*
| Years | Team | Apps | (Gls) |
| 2014–2016 | Wikki Tourists | | |
| 2016–2019 | Viking | 41 | (4) |
| 2020–2021 | KuPS | 23 | (3) |
| 2021 | → AC Oulu (loan) | 15 | (1) |
| 2022–2023 | PEPO | 6 | (0) |
| 2023 | Al-Naft | | |
| 2023 | Al-Safa | 4 | (0) |
| 2023– | Duhok | | |
- * Club domestic league appearances and goals as of 3 November 2021

Usman Sani Hassan Sale (born 27 August 1995) is a Nigerian footballer who plays as a winger for Iraqi club Duhok.

== Career ==
Sale signed for Viking FK on a four-year deal in January 2016 together with fellow countryman Aniekpeno Udo. He scored his first goal for the club against Bodø/Glimt in the 29th round of the 2016 season. In October 2019, Sale's contract with Viking was terminated.

In December 2019, Sale signed for Veikkausliiga side Kuopion Palloseura.

== Career statistics ==
As of match played 11 May 2021

| Club | Season | League | | | Cup | | Continental | | Total | |
| Club | Season | Division | Apps | Goals | Apps | Goals | Apps | Goals | Apps | Goals |
|---|---|---|---|---|---|---|---|---|---|---|
| Viking | 2016 | Eliteserien | 9 | 1 | 2 | 0 | — | | 11 | 1 |
| Viking | 2017 | Eliteserien | 10 | 0 | 1 | 0 | — | | 11 | 0 |
| Viking | 2018 | 1. divisjon | 13 | 2 | 1 | 0 | — | | 14 | 2 |
| Viking | 2019 | Eliteserien | 9 | 1 | 3 | 0 | — | | 12 | 1 |
| Viking | Total | | 41 | 4 | 7 | 0 | — | | 48 | 4 |
| KuPS | 2020 | Veikkausliiga | 19 | 2 | 7 | 1 | 4 | 0 | 30 | 3 |
| KuPS | 2021 | Veikkausliiga | 3 | 1 | 1 | 0 | 0 | 0 | 4 | 1 |
| KuPS | Total | | 22 | 3 | 8 | 1 | 4 | 0 | 34 | 4 |
| Career total | | | 63 | 7 | 15 | 1 | 4 | 0 | 82 | 8 |

== Honours ==
Viking

- 1. divisjon: 2018
- Norwegian Football Cup: 2019

=== Individual ===
- Veikkausliiga Breakthrough of the Year: 2020
