= Tord Salte =

Norwegian footballer (born 1999)

Personal information
- Full name: Tord Johnsen Salte
- Date of birth: 8 February 1999 (age 27)
- Place of birth: Oslo, Norway
- Height: 1.84 m (6 ft 0 in)
- Positions: Centre-back; defensive midfielder

Team information
- Current team: Egersund
- Number: 6

Youth career
- 2003–2015: Bryne
- 2015–2018: Lyon

Senior career*
| Years | Team | Apps | (Gls) |
| 2016–2018 | Lyon B | 1 | (0) |
| 2018 | → Viking (loan) | 9 | (0) |
| 2018–2021 | Viking | 24 | (0) |
| 2020 | → Sandnes Ulf (loan) | 28 | (0) |
| 2021 | → Sogndal (loan) | 9 | (0) |
| 2021 | Sogndal | 6 | (0) |
| 2022–2023 | Arendal | 41 | (0) |
| 2024– | Egersund | 6 | (0) |

International career^{‡}
| 2014 | Norway U15 | 6 | (0) |
| 2015 | Norway U16 | 10 | (1) |
| 2015–2016 | Norway U17 | 9 | (1) |
| 2017 | Norway U18 | 12 | (0) |
| 2018 | Norway U19 | 5 | (0) |
| 2019 | Norway U20 | 1 | (0) |
| 2019 | Norway U21 | 4 | (0) |
- * Club domestic league appearances and goals as of 14 November 2024 ‡ National team caps and goals as of 11 May 2021

Tord Johnsen Salte (born 8 February 1999) is a Norwegian footballer who plays as a defender for Egersund.

== Club career ==
On 2 February 2018, Salte joined Viking FK on loan from Olympique Lyonnais until the summer. On 25 June 2018, he joined the club permanently, signing a three-year contract. In February 2020, he joined Sandnes Ulf on a season-long loan. On 4 June 2021, he was loaned out for a second time, this time to Sogndal. On 28 July 2021, he joined Sogndal permanently on a contract until the end of the year. In March 2022, he signed a contract with Arendal.

== International career ==
Salte has represented Norway from under-15 to under-21 level, making a total of 47 international appearances between 2014 and 2019.

== Career statistics ==
As of match played 29 September 2021

Appearances and goals by club, season and competition
| Club | Season | League | | | Cup | | Continental | | Other | | Total | |
| Club | Season | Division | Apps | Goals | Apps | Goals | Apps | Goals | Apps | Goals | Apps | Goals |
|---|---|---|---|---|---|---|---|---|---|---|---|---|
| Viking | 2018 | 1. divisjon | 15 | 0 | 2 | 0 | — | | — | | 17 | 0 |
| Viking | 2019 | Eliteserien | 18 | 0 | 3 | 0 | — | | — | | 21 | 0 |
| Viking | 2020 | Eliteserien | 0 | 0 | — | | 0 | 0 | — | | 0 | 0 |
| Viking | 2021 | Eliteserien | 0 | 0 | 0 | 0 | — | | — | | 0 | 0 |
| Viking | Total | | 33 | 0 | 5 | 0 | — | | — | | 38 | 0 |
| Sandnes Ulf (loan) | 2020 | 1. divisjon | 28 | 0 | — | | — | | — | | 28 | 0 |
| Sogndal | 2021 | 1. divisjon | 15 | 0 | 3 | 0 | — | | — | | 18 | 0 |
| Career total | | | 76 | 0 | 8 | 0 | 0 | 0 | 0 | 0 | 84 | 0 |

== Honours ==
Viking

- Norwegian First Division: 2018
- Norwegian Football Cup: 2019
