= Viljar Vevatne =

Norwegian footballer (born 1994)

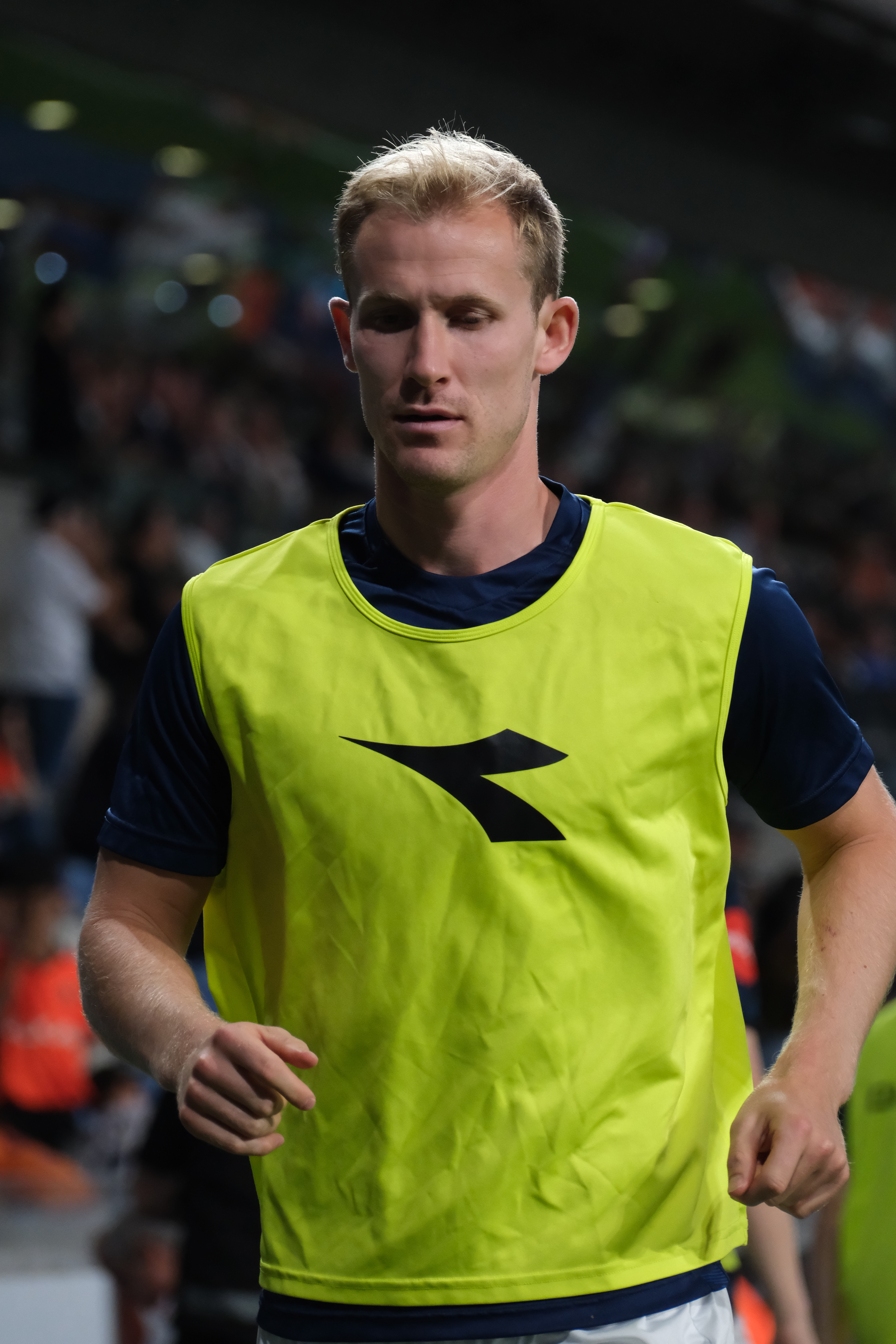
- Vevatne with Viking in 2025

Personal information
- Full name: Viljar Helland Vevatne
- Date of birth: 7 December 1994 (age 31)
- Place of birth: Stavanger, Norway
- Height: 1.83 m (6 ft 0 in)
- Position: Defender

Team information
- Current team: Viking
- Number: 3

Youth career
- 2006–2014: Viking

Senior career*
Years	Team	Apps	(Gls)
2014–2015	Bryne	39	(9)
2015–2016	Brann	2	(0)
2016–2017	Sandnes Ulf	42	(1)
2018–	Viking	172	(8)

International career
2012	Norway U18	5	(0)
2013	Norway U19	7	(0)
- * Club domestic league appearances and goals as of 23 July 2026

Viljar Helland Vevatne (born 7 December 1994) is a Norwegian footballer who plays as a defender for Viking.

== Career ==
Vevatne started his career with Viking, where he was a part of the youth academy. He did not manage to break through to the first team, so he instead joined Bryne in 2014, where he signed his first professional contract. On 25 July 2016, he joined Sandnes Ulf, after an unsuccessful spell with Brann, where he only made three first team appearances. He returned to Viking ahead of the 2018 season, signing a three-year contract. On 13 December 2019, he signed a contract extension keeping him at the club until the end of the 2022 season.

Vevatne made eight appearances as Viking won the 2025 Eliteserien.

== Career statistics ==
As of match played 23 July 2026

Appearances and goals by club, season and competition
Club	Season	League			National cup		Other		Total	
Club	Season	Division	Apps	Goals	Apps	Goals	Apps	Goals	Apps	Goals
Bryne	2014	1. divisjon	22	4	2	0	—		24	4
Bryne	2015	1. divisjon	17	5	3	0	—		20	5
Bryne	Total		39	9	5	0	—		44	9
Brann	2015	1. divisjon	2	0	0	0	—		2	0
Brann	2016	Eliteserien	0	0	1	0	—		1	0
Brann	Total		2	0	1	0	—		3	0
Sandnes Ulf	2016	1. divisjon	13	0	0	0	1 (Note: Appearance(s) in Eliteserien play-offs)	0	14	0
Sandnes Ulf	2017	1. divisjon	29	1	2	0	1	0	32	1
Sandnes Ulf	Total		42	1	2	0	2	0	46	1
Viking	2018	1. divisjon	18	1	2	0	—		20	1
Viking	2019	Eliteserien	29	1	7	0	—		36	1
Viking	2020	Eliteserien	27	3	—		1 (Note: Appearance in UEFA Europa League)	0	28	3
Viking	2021	Eliteserien	29	1	4	0	—		33	1
Viking	2022	Eliteserien	22	1	3	1	6 (Note: Appearance(s) in UEFA Conference League)	1	31	3
Viking	2023	Eliteserien	13	0	3	0	—		16	0
Viking	2024	Eliteserien	24	1	4	0	—		28	1
Viking	2025	Eliteserien	8	0	6	2	1	0	15	2
Viking	2026	Eliteserien	2	0	0	0	0	0	2	0
Viking	Total		172	8	29	3	8	1	209	12
Career total			255	18	37	3	10	1	302	22

== Honours ==
Viking

- Eliteserien: 2025
- Norwegian First Division: 2018
- Norwegian Football Cup: 2019
