= Johnny Furdal =

Norwegian football player (born 1986)

Personal information
- Full name: Johnny Furdal
- Date of birth: 4 May 1986 (age 40)
- Place of birth: Husnes, Norway
- Height: 1.83 m (6 ft 0 in)
- Position: Midfielder

Youth career
- 2001–2003: Rosendal

Senior career*
Years	Team	Apps	(Gls)
2003–2007	Haugesund	5	(0)
2006	→ Vard Haugesund (loan)		
2007–2008	Trio		
2008–2018	Nest-Sotra	159+	(85)
2018–2021	Viking	39	(8)
- * Club domestic league appearances and goals

Johnny Furdal (born 4 May 1986) is a Norwegian former professional footballer who played as a midfielder.

== Career ==
Furdal has spent most of his career playing for Nest-Sotra. He played for the club for 11 years. Nest-Sotra retired his shirt number, 15, when he left the club in 2018.

On 26 July 2018, Furdal signed a two-and-a-half-year contract with Viking FK. He was named player of the year in the 2018 1. divisjon, after scoring 12 goals and making 14 assists. On 5 June 2020, his contract with Viking was extended until the end of the 2021 season. On 12 July 2021, he announced that he would retire at the end of the 2021 season.

== Career statistics ==
Appearances and goals by club, season and competition
Club	Season	League			Cup		Continental		Total	
Club	Season	Division	Apps	Goals	Apps	Goals	Apps	Goals	Apps	Goals
Haugesund	2004	1. divisjon	5	0	1	1	—		6	1
Haugesund	2005	2. divisjon	0	0	2	0	—		2	0
Haugesund	Total		5	0	3	1	—		8	1
Nest-Sotra	2009	2. divisjon		12	3	1	—			13
Nest-Sotra	2010	2. divisjon		10	2	0	—			10
Nest-Sotra	2011	2. divisjon		9	1	0	—			9
Nest-Sotra	2012	2. divisjon	23	6	1	0	—		24	6
Nest-Sotra	2013	2. divisjon	25	13	2	0	—		27	13
Nest-Sotra	2014	1. divisjon	27	4	0	0	—		27	4
Nest-Sotra	2015	1. divisjon	20	1	0	0	—		20	1
Nest-Sotra	2016	2. divisjon	24	16	3	3	—		27	19
Nest-Sotra	2017	2. divisjon	24	7	2	1	—		26	8
Nest-Sotra	2018	1. divisjon	16	7	2	1	—		18	8
Nest-Sotra	Total		159+	85	16	6	—		175+	91
Viking	2018	1. divisjon	13	5	0	0	—		13	5
Viking	2019	Eliteserien	15	3	4	1	—		19	4
Viking	2020	Eliteserien	11	0	—		0	0	11	0
Viking	2021	Eliteserien	0	0	0	0	—		0	0
Viking	Total		39	8	4	1	0	0	43	9
Career total			203+	93	23	8	0	0	226+	101

Notes

- League appearances between 2009 and 2011 are missing.

== Honours ==
Viking

- Norwegian First Division: 2018
- Norwegian Football Cup: 2019

Individual

- Norwegian First Division player of the season: 2018
