= Even Østensen =

Norwegian footballer (born 1993)

Personal information
- Date of birth: 2 June 1993 (age 33)
- Place of birth: Hjelmeland Municipality, Norway
- Height: 1.84 m (6 ft 0 in)
- Positions: Striker; winger

Team information
- Current team: Staal Jørpeland
- Number: 16

Youth career
- –2011: Hjelmeland

Senior career*
Years	Team	Apps	(Gls)
2012–2018	Staal Jørpeland	117	(78)
2018–2020	Viking	42	(7)
2021–	Staal Jørpeland	56	(41)
- * Club domestic league appearances and goals as of 13:49, 1 November 2023 (UTC)

Even Østensen (born 2 June 1993) is a Norwegian footballer who plays as a forward for Staal Jørpeland.

== Career ==
On 2 August 2018, Østensen signed a six month contract with Viking. He signed a contract extension after the 2018 season. After the 2020 season, his contract expired and he left the club.

In January 2021, Østensen announced his retirement from football, however one month later he returned to his former club Staal Jørpeland. On 25 July 2021, he scored a brace against his former club Viking in the first round of the 2021–22 Norwegian Cup, but Staal Jørpeland still lost 3–2.

== Career statistics ==
As of match played 29 October 2023

Appearances and goals by club, season and competition
Club	Season	League			Cup		Continental		Total	
Club	Season	Division	Apps	Goals	Apps	Goals	Apps	Goals	Apps	Goals
Staal Jørpeland	2012	3. divisjon	20	2	2	0	—		22	2
Staal Jørpeland	2013	3. divisjon	0	0	0	0	—		0	0
Staal Jørpeland	2014	3. divisjon	16	6	1	0	—		17	6
Staal Jørpeland	2015	3. divisjon	18	8	2	0	—		20	8
Staal Jørpeland	2016	3. divisjon	25	22	1	0	—		26	22
Staal Jørpeland	2017	3. divisjon	24	23	2	1	—		26	24
Staal Jørpeland	2018	3. divisjon	14	17	3	5	—		17	22
Staal Jørpeland	Total		117	78	11	6	—		128	84
Viking	2018	1. divisjon	10	2	0	0	—		10	2
Viking	2019	Eliteserien	15	4	4	1	—		19	5
Viking	2020	Eliteserien	17	1	—		1 (Note: Appearance in UEFA Europa League)	0	18	1
Viking	Total		42	7	4	1	1	0	47	8
Staal Jørpeland	2021	3. divisjon	13	16	1	2	—		14	18
Staal Jørpeland	2022	2. divisjon	21	9	1	0	—		22	9
Staal Jørpeland	2023	3. divisjon	22	16	1	0	—		23	16
Staal Jørpeland	Total		56	41	3	2	—		59	43
Career total			215	126	18	9	1	0	234	135

== Honours ==
Viking

- 1. divisjon: 2018
- Norwegian Football Cup: 2019
