= Runar Hove =

Norwegian footballer (born 1995)

Personal information
- Full name: Runar Ullaland Hove
- Date of birth: 8 August 1995 (age 31)
- Place of birth: Florø, Norway
- Height: 1.95 m (6 ft 5 in)
- Position: Centre-back

Youth career
- –2011: Florø

Senior career*
Years	Team	Apps	(Gls)
2011–2018	Florø	139	(33)
2019–2021	Viking	37	(2)
2021–2022	Brann	6	(0)

International career
2011	Norway U16	6	(1)
2012	Norway U17	2	(0)
- * Club domestic league appearances and goals

Runar Ullaland Hove (born 8 August 1995) is a Norwegian former footballer who played as a centre-back.

== Career ==
Hove was born in the town of Florø and started his senior career with Florø SK in 2011. He stayed with the club for eight seasons. On 20 December 2018, he signed a three-year contract with Eliteserien club Viking. Despite being sidelined for two months with a knee injury, Hove played regularly throughout the 2019 season, amassing 24 appearances in total. He was also a starter in the victorious cup final against Haugesund the same year. In the third round of the 2020 Eliteserien, he suffered a hamstring injury that would keep him sidelined for the rest of the season. On 26 August 2021, he signed a one-and-a-half-year contract with fellow Eliteserien club Brann. Brann were relegated after a play-off match where Hove was sent off and the match was decided on penalties. He retired after the 2022 season at the age of 27.

== Career statistics ==
Appearances and goals by club, season and competition
Club	Season	League			Cup		Continental		Other		Total	
Club	Season	Division	Apps	Goals	Apps	Goals	Apps	Goals	Apps	Goals	Apps	Goals
Florø	2011	3. divisjon	2	0	0	0	—		—		2	0
Florø	2012	3. divisjon	10	1	2	0	—		—		12	1
Florø	2013	3. divisjon	24	7	3	0	—		—		27	7
Florø	2014	2. divisjon	25	7	3	1	—		—		28	8
Florø	2015	2. divisjon	12	2	1	0	—		—		13	2
Florø	2016	2. divisjon	26	8	1	0	—		—		27	8
Florø	2017	1. divisjon	25	6	4	0	—		—		29	6
Florø	2018	1. divisjon	15	2	0	0	—		—		15	2
Florø	Total		139	33	14	1	—		—		153	34
Viking	2019	Eliteserien	20	2	4	0	—		—		24	2
Viking	2020	Eliteserien	3	0	—		0	0	—		3	0
Viking	2021	Eliteserien	14	0	0	0	—		—		14	0
Viking	Total		37	2	4	0	0	0	—		41	2
Brann	2021	Eliteserien	6	0	0	0	—		1 (Note: Appearance in relegation play-off)	0	7	0
Brann	2022	1. divisjon	0	0	1	0	—		—		1	0
Brann	Total		6	0	1	0	—		1	0	8	0
Career total			182	35	19	1	0	0	1	0	202	36

== Personal life ==
He is a twin brother of fellow Florø player Erlend Hove.

== Honours ==
Viking

- Norwegian Football Cup: 2019
