= Axel Óskar Andrésson =

Icelandic footballer (born 1998)

Personal information
- Full name: Axel Óskar Andrésson
- Date of birth: 27 January 1998 (age 28)
- Place of birth: Mosfellsbær, Iceland
- Height: 1.93 m (6 ft 4 in)
- Position: Centre-back

Team information
- Current team: Afturelding
- Number: 3

Youth career
- 2013–2014: Afturelding
- 2014–2016: Reading

Senior career*
Years	Team	Apps	(Gls)
2014	Afturelding	8	(0)
2016–2018	Reading	0	(0)
2016–2017	→ Bath City (loan)	16	(5)
2017–2018	→ Torquay United (loan)	4	(0)
2018	→ Viking (loan)	9	(1)
2019–2020	Viking	18	(0)
2021–2022	Riga	11	(1)
2022–2023	Örebro	49	(3)
2024	KR	21	(2)
2025–	Afturelding	44	(3)

International career^{‡}
2013–2015	Iceland U17	21	(0)
2015–2016	Iceland U19	7	(2)
2017–2019	Iceland U21	18	(3)
2019–	Iceland	2	(0)
- * Club domestic league appearances and goals as of 12 September 2026 ‡ National team caps and goals as of 30 January 2019

Axel Óskar Andrésson (born 27 January 1998) is an Icelandic professional footballer who plays as a centre-back for Afturelding.

== Club career ==
Axel started his career in the youth team of local side Ungmennafélagið Afturelding before he was promoted to the first team at only the age of sixteen, going on to represent the side eleven times in the 2014 2. deild karla season. After impressing for Afturelding he was invited for a trial in England for the youth team at Reading.

=== Reading ===
In July 2014, Axel joined Reading permanently, signing a two-year scholarship with the club. In July 2016 he graduated from the under-18 side having already committed to signing his first professional contract with the club. Having moved up to the under-23 squad, Axel was sent out on loan to gain some first team experience at National League South side Bath City in November 2016. Axel impressed during his time with the Romans scoring five goals from defence, and was even promoted to captain despite only being aged nineteen. He went on to make a total of eighteen appearances for Bath in all competitions. He was promoted to the first team upon his return to Reading in the summer of 2017, and made his professional and first team debut in the EFL Cup win over Gillingham on 8 August. On 6 December 2017, Axel joined Torquay United on a one-month youth loan deal until 6 January 2018.

On 15 August 2018, Axel signed a new contract with Reading, until the summer of 2020, and then immediately joined Norwegian 1. divisjon club Viking FK on loan until the end of their 2018 season.

=== Viking ===
On 21 December 2018, Viking FK announced the signing of Axel on a three-year contract for an undisclosed fee. During the opening game of the 2019 season on 31 March against Kristiansund, Axel suffered a season-ending knee ligament injury.

=== Riga FC ===
On 8 February 2021, Axel signed for Latvian club Riga FC. On 25 March 2022, Axel and Riga terminated their contract by mutual agreement.

=== Örebro ===
On 25 March 2022, Örebro announced the singing of Axel to a three-year contract.

=== KR ===
On 8 March 2024, Axel signed a three-year deal with KR.

=== Afturelding ===
On 7 December 2024, Afturelding announced the signing of Axel and his brother Jökull.

== International career ==
Axel has represented Iceland at under-17, under-19 and under-21 level. In December 2018, Axel got his first call-up for the Iceland national football team. He made his debut for the squad on 11 January 2019 in a friendly against Sweden, as a 70th-minute substitute for Eiður Sigurbjörnsson.

== Personal life ==
Axel is the son of Andrés Guðmundsson, a former international strongman competitor and former holder of the World Strongman Challenge title.

His younger brother is Jökull Andrésson, who is also contracted to Reading.

== Career statistics ==
=== Club ===
As of match played 25 October 2025

Appearances and goals by club, season and competition
Club	Season	League			Cup		League Cup		Continental		Other		Total	
Club	Season	Division	Apps	Goals	Apps	Goals	Apps	Goals	Apps	Goals	Apps	Goals	Apps	Goals
Afturelding	2014	2. deild karla	8	0	3	0	—		—		—		11	0
Reading	2016–17	Championship	0	0	0	0	0	0	—		0	0	0	0
Reading	2017–18	Championship	0	0	0	0	2	0	—		—		2	0
Reading	2018–19	Championship	0	0	0	0	0	0	—		—		0	0
Reading	Total		0	0	0	0	2	0	-	-	0	0	2	0
Reading U23	2016–17	Division 1	7	0	4	0	—		—		0	0	11	0
Reading U23	2017–18	Division 2	8	0	0	0	—		1	0	1 (Note: Appearances in EFL Trophy)	0	10	0
Reading U23	2018–19	Division 2	0	0	0	0	—		0	0	0	0	0	0
Reading U23	Total		15	0	4	0	—		1	0	1	0	21	0
Bath City (loan)	2016–17	National League South	16	5	—		—		—		2 (Note: Appearances in FA Trophy)	0	18	5
Torquay United (loan)	2017–18	National League	4	0	0	0	—		—		1 (Note: Appearances in FA Trophy)	0	5	0
Viking (loan)	2018	1. divisjon	9	1	0	0	—		—		—		9	1
Viking	2019	Eliteserien	1	0	0	0	—		—		—		1	0
Viking	2020	Eliteserien	17	0	0	0	—		1	0	—		18	0
Viking	Total		18	0	0	0	-	-	1	0	-	-	19	0
Riga	2021	Latvian Higher League	11	1	1	0	—		0	0	—		12	1
Riga	2022	Latvian Higher League	0	0	0	0	—		0	0	—		0	0
Riga	Total		11	1	1	0	-	-	-	-	-	-	12	1
Örebro	2022	Superettan	27	2	0	0	—						27	2
Örebro	2023	Superettan	22	1	3	0	—						25	1
Örebro	Total		49	3	3	0	-	-	-	-	-	-	52	1
KR	2024	Besta deild karla	21	2	2	2	—		—		—		23	4
Afturelding	2025	Besta deild karla	24	0	1	0	4	0	—		—		29	0
Career total			175	12	11	2	6	0	2	0	4	0	198	14

=== International ===
As of matches played 15 January 2019

National team	Year	Apps	Goals
Iceland	2019	2	0
Total		2	0

== Honours ==
Viking FK

- 1. divisjon: 2018
