= Jostein Ekeland =

Norwegian footballer (born 1997)

Personal information
- Full name: Jostein Ekeland
- Date of birth: 24 July 1997 (age 29)
- Place of birth: Stavanger, Norway
- Position: Forward

Team information
- Current team: Egersund
- Number: 16

Youth career
- 2008–2016: Viking

Senior career*
Years	Team	Apps	(Gls)
2017–2018	Vidar	42	(9)
2019	Viking	11	(1)
2020–2022	Sandnes Ulf	65	(18)
2023–2025	Strømsgodset	20	(0)
2026–	Egersund	23	(5)
- * Club domestic league appearances and goals as of 14 November 2026

Jostein Ekeland (born 24 July 1997) is a Norwegian footballer who plays as a forward for Egersund.

== Career ==
On 2 April 2019, Ekeland signed a one-year contract with Eliteserien club Viking FK. On 18 December 2019, he signed a three-year contract with 1. divisjon club Sandnes Ulf.

== Career statistics ==
As of match played 7 July 2026

Club	Season	League			Cup		Continental		Other		Total	
Club	Season	Division	Apps	Goals	Apps	Goals	Apps	Goals	Apps	Goals	Apps	Goals
Vidar	2017	2. divisjon	20	5	1	0	—		—		21	5
Vidar	2018	2. divisjon	22	4	0	0	—		—		22	4
Vidar	Total		42	9	1	0	—		—		43	9
Viking	2019	Eliteserien	11	1	2	0	—		—		13	1
Sandnes Ulf	2020	1. divisjon	10	1	—		—		—		10	1
Sandnes Ulf	2021	1. divisjon	26	8	4	2	—		—		30	10
Sandnes Ulf	2022	1. divisjon	28	10	1	0	—		1	0	30	10
Sandnes Ulf	Total		64	19	5	2	—		1	0	70	21
Strømsgodset	2023	Eliteserien	13	0	2	0	—		—		15	0
Strømsgodset	2024	Eliteserien	6	0	3	0	—		—		9	0
Strømsgodset	2025	Eliteserien	1	0	1	0	—		—		2	0
Strømsgodset	Total		20	0	6	0	—		—		26	0
Egersund	2026	1. divisjon	10	2	1	0	—		—		11	2
Career total			147	31	15	2	0	0	1	0	163	33

== Honours ==
Viking

- Norwegian Football Cup: 2019
