= Zlatko Tripić =

Norwegian footballer (born 1992)

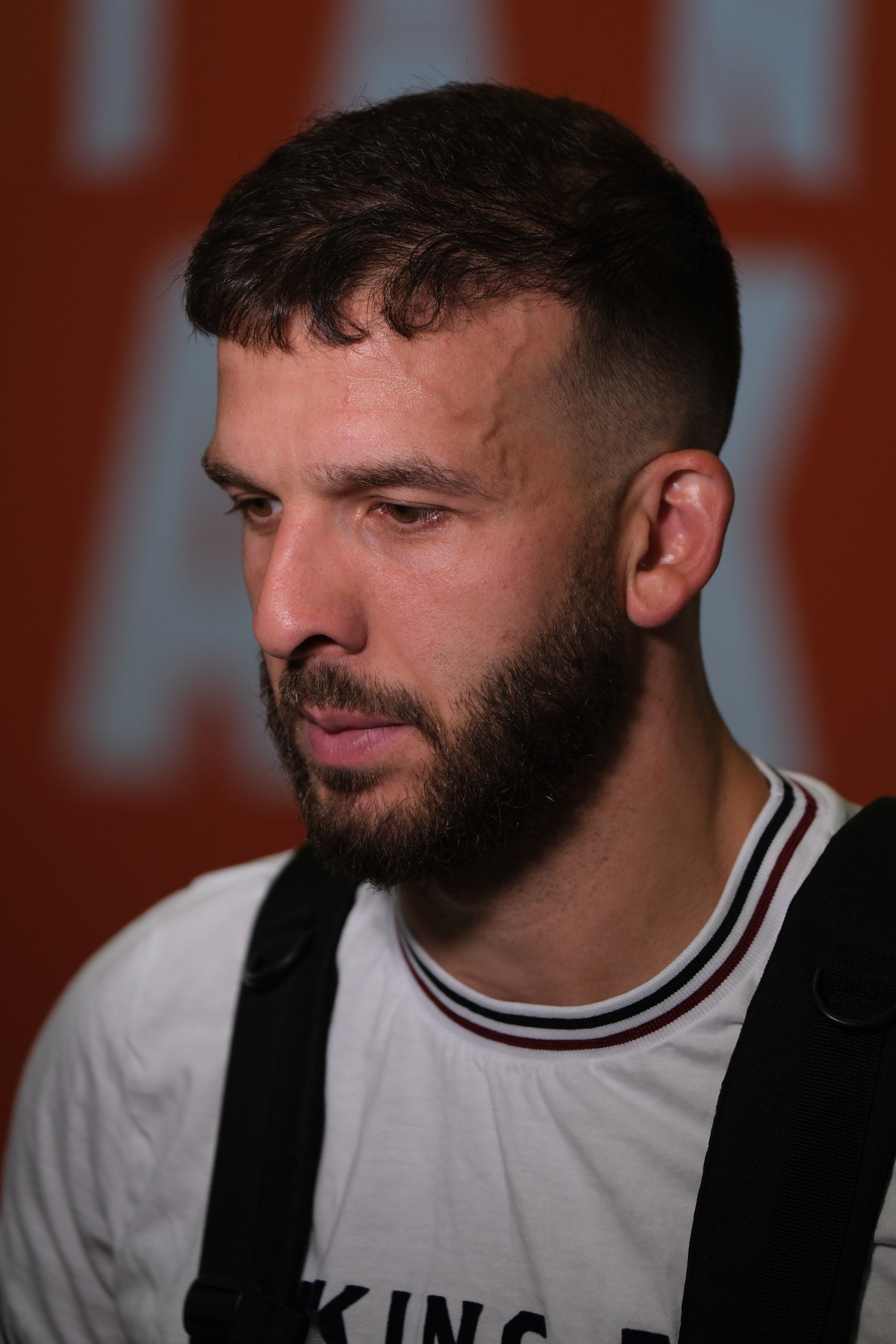
- Tripić in 2025

Personal information
- Full name: Zlatko Hovland Tripić
- Date of birth: 2 December 1992 (age 33)
- Place of birth: Rijeka, Croatia
- Height: 1.82 m (6 ft 0 in)
- Position: Winger

Team information
- Current team: Viking
- Number: 10

Youth career
- Lyngdal
- Tonstad

Senior career*
Years	Team	Apps	(Gls)
2011	Egersund	20	(6)
2011–2014	Molde	39	(3)
2012	→ Fredrikstad (loan)	10	(1)
2014–2015	Start	28	(6)
2015–2017	Greuther Fürth	36	(1)
2017–2018	Sheriff Tiraspol	5	(0)
2018–2020	Viking	49	(12)
2020–2021	Göztepe	42	(3)
2021–	Viking	150	(52)

International career
2012	Norway U21	1	(0)
2014–2015	Norway U23	2	(0)
- * Club domestic league appearances and goals as of 21 November 2026

Zlatko Hovland Tripić (Serbian Cyrillic: Златко Трипић; born 2 December 1992) is a professional footballer who plays as a winger for and captains Eliteserien club Viking. Born in Croatia, he represented Norway internationally.

Tripić has won six titles with various clubs, and won the Eliteserien Player of the Year award for 2024 He is the current holder of the Eliteserien assist record, after providing 19 assists in 20 games in 2026.

== Club career ==
Tripić was born in Rijeka, Croatia to Bosnian parents. When he was 9 months old, he moved to Norway with his parents and grew up in Lyngdal Municipality, playing youth football for Lyngdal IL. During his youth he attended a lot of Start's home matches. He moved to Sirdal Municipality in August 2008, and spent the next three years as a student at Sirdal VGS football. At the same time he joined Tonstad IL, playing league football for their first team at the sixth tier of the Norwegian football league pyramid. In his last match for Tonstad, at an indoor tournament, Tripic scored the winning goal when Tonstad beat Egersund IK by 2–1 in the final. Egersund, playing at level 3, was impressed by young Tripic, and signed him only two months later. Here, he played an instrumental role as his club pushed for promotion, going top of their league in early June after Tripic scored a goal direct from a free-kick against fellow promotion chasers Brodd.

After an impressive display against Viking in a 2011 Norwegian Football Cup first-round tie, he made headlines in several Norwegian newspapers. It was thought that Viking would be his next career stop, but in a hectic summer, where he had trials at both Strømsgodset and Molde, his move to Molde was completed in August 2011 for an undisclosed fee. He only made 11 league appearances for Egersund during the four months he stayed with the club.

He made his debut in Tippeligaen for Molde, coming on as a late substitute in a 2–1 win against Start before he had even trained with his new teammates. The club became league champions in late October.

The next year, Tripic was loaned out to Fredrikstad FK for the last part of the 2012 season, following Etzaz Hussain's transfer the other way around.

After the 2014 season had ended, Tripic moved to German 2. Bundesliga side Greuther Fürth, signing a contract until 2017.

On 3 August 2017, Tripic signed for FC Sheriff Tiraspol.

On 21 February 2018, after his contract with Sheriff Tiraspol had been terminated, Tripić signed for Viking. In 2019, he led the club to the 2019 Norwegian Cup final as team captain. He scored the lone goal in the final, as Viking defeated Haugesund 1–0.

On 15 January 2020, Tripić signed for Turkish Süper Lig side Göztepe. On 3 May 2021, his contract with Göztepe was terminated by mutual consent.

On 7 May 2021, Tripić returned to his former club Viking, signing a five-year contract until the end of 2025. On 4 July 2024, his contract was extended until the end of 2026. Tripić was named Eliteserien Player of the Year after the 2024 Eliteserien season. In 2025 he became the first Eliteserien player to reach ten or more goals and ten or more assists three seasons in a row. On 28 November 2025, his contract was extended until the end of 2027. On 30 November 2025, Viking won the 2025 Eliteserien, the club's first league title since 1991, with Tripić as team captain. He was named in the Eliteserien Team of the Year in both 2024 and 2025. In the 2026 Eliteserien, Tripić's 19 assists set a new Eliteserien record with 8 games remaining to play, surpassing the previous record of 18, set by Bodø/Glimt's Philip Zinckernagel in 2020.

== International career ==
Tripic made his debut for Norway U21 in a friendly match against Netherlands U21 on 11 October 2012.

== Career statistics ==
As of match played 21 November 2026

Appearances and goals by club, season and competition
Club	Season	Division	League		National cup (Note: Includes Norwegian Cup, DFB-Pokal, Turkish Cup)		Europe		Total	
Club	Season	Division	Apps	Goals	Apps	Goals	Apps	Goals	Apps	Goals
Molde	2011	Eliteserien	9	1	1	0	—		10	1
Molde	2012	Eliteserien	12	0	4	0	2 (Note: Appearance(s) in UEFA Champions League)	0	18	0
Molde	2013	Eliteserien	18	2	5	1	6 (Note: Four appearances in UEFA Champions League, two appearances in UEFA Europa League)	0	29	3
Molde	Total		39	3	10	1	8	0	57	4
Fredrikstad (loan)	2012	Eliteserien	10	1	0	0	—		10	1
Start	2014	Eliteserien	28	6	4	2	—		32	8
Greuther Fürth	2014–15	2. Bundesliga	9	0	0	0	—		9	0
Greuther Fürth	2015–16	2. Bundesliga	14	0	1	0	—		15	0
Greuther Fürth	2016–17	2. Bundesliga	13	1	2	1	—		15	2
Greuther Fürth	Total		36	1	3	1	—		39	2
Sheriff Tiraspol	2017	Moldovan National Division	5	0	0	0	3 (Note: Appearances in UEFA Europa League)	0	8	0
Viking	2018	Norwegian First Division	25	7	1	0	—		26	7
Viking	2019	Eliteserien	24	5	6	3	—		30	8
Viking	Total		49	12	7	3	—		56	15
Göztepe	2019–20	Süper Lig	11	0	1	1	—		12	1
Göztepe	2020–21	Süper Lig	31	3	2	0	—		33	3
Göztepe	Total		42	3	3	1	—		45	4
Viking	2021	Eliteserien	23	6	5	2	—		28	8
Viking	2022	Eliteserien	20	5	3	1	6 (Note: Appearances in UEFA Conference League)	2	29	8
Viking	2023	Eliteserien	29	13	3	1	—		32	14
Viking	2024	Eliteserien	28	10	1	0	—		29	10
Viking	2025	Eliteserien	25	11	3	0	4	1	32	12
Viking	2026	Eliteserien	25	7	3	1	6	4	34	12
Viking	Total		150	52	18	5	16	7	184	64
Career total			359	78	45	13	27	7	431	98

== Honours ==
Molde

- Eliteserien: 2011, 2012
- Norwegian Cup: 2013

Sheriff Tiraspol

- Moldovan National Division: 2017

Viking

- Eliteserien: 2025
- 1. divisjon: 2018
- Norwegian Cup: 2019

Individual

- Eliteserien Player of the Month: July 2023, May 2026
- Eliteserien Player of the Year: 2024
