= Daniel Ciach =

Polish footballer (born 1990)

Personal information
- Full name: Daniel Ciach
- Date of birth: 21 March 1990 (age 36)
- Place of birth: Gorzów Wlkp., Poland
- Height: 1.86 m (6 ft 1 in)
- Position: Defender

Team information
- Current team: Midtbygdens IL

Youth career
- Róża Różanki
- 2004–2006: UKP Zielona Góra
- 2006: Dyskobolia Grodzisk Wlkp.

Senior career*
Years	Team	Apps	(Gls)
2007	Dyskobolia Grodzisk Wlkp. II		
2007–2008	Dyskobolia Grodzisk Wlkp. (ME)	3	(0)
2008	Pogoń Świebodzin	14	(1)
2009–2012	Polonia Warsaw	3	(0)
2010–2011	→ GKP Gorzów Wlkp. (loan)	22	(3)
2012	Warta Poznań	16	(0)
2013	Radomiak Radom	21	(2)
2015	Stilon Gorzów Wielkopolski	2	(0)
2015	Einheit Rudolstadt	9	(0)
2016	Pelikan Niechanowo	13	(0)
2016–2018	Elana Toruń	54	(5)
2018–2024	Staal Jørpeland	83	(23)
2024–	Midtbygdens IL		
- * Club domestic league appearances and goals as of 22:32, 18 June 2024 (UTC)

Daniel Ciach (born 21 March 1990) is a Polish footballer who plays as a defender for Norwegian club Midtbygdens IL.

== Career ==
In July 2010, he was loaned to GKP Gorzów Wlkp. on a one-year deal. He returned to Polonia Warsaw one year later. In July 2012, he transferred to the Polish I liga side Warta Poznań.

== Honours ==
Dyskobolia Grodzisk Wlkp.

- Ekstraklasa Cup: 2007–08

Elana Toruń

- III liga, group II: 2017–18
