= Otar Javashvili =

Georgian footballer

Personal information
- Date of birth: 17 August 1993 (age 33)
- Place of birth: Tbilisi, Georgia
- Height: 1.81 m (5 ft 11 in)
- Position: Left-back

Youth career
- 2011–2012: WIT Georgia

Senior career*
Years	Team	Apps	(Gls)
2011–2013	WIT Georgia	34	(2)
2014	Zugdidi	24	(1)
2015	Arka Gdynia II	4	(0)
2015–2016	Zugdidi	23	(0)
2017	Slavia Mozyr	24	(2)
2018	Gomel	6	(0)
2018	Florø	13	(1)
2019	Gagra	8	(0)
2020	Chikhura	17	(0)
2021	Rustavi	8	(2)
2022	Sioni Bolnisi	14	(0)
2023	Mash'al Mubarek	19	(0)
2024	Orbi		
2025–	Aragvi Dusheti		
- * Club domestic league appearances and goals as of 31 December 2023

Otar Javashvili (Georgian: ოთარ ჯავაშვილი; born 17 August 1993) is a Georgian professional footballer who plays as a left-back. Earlier in 2018, he played for Gomel in Belarus.
