= Aniekpeno Udo =

Nigerian footballer

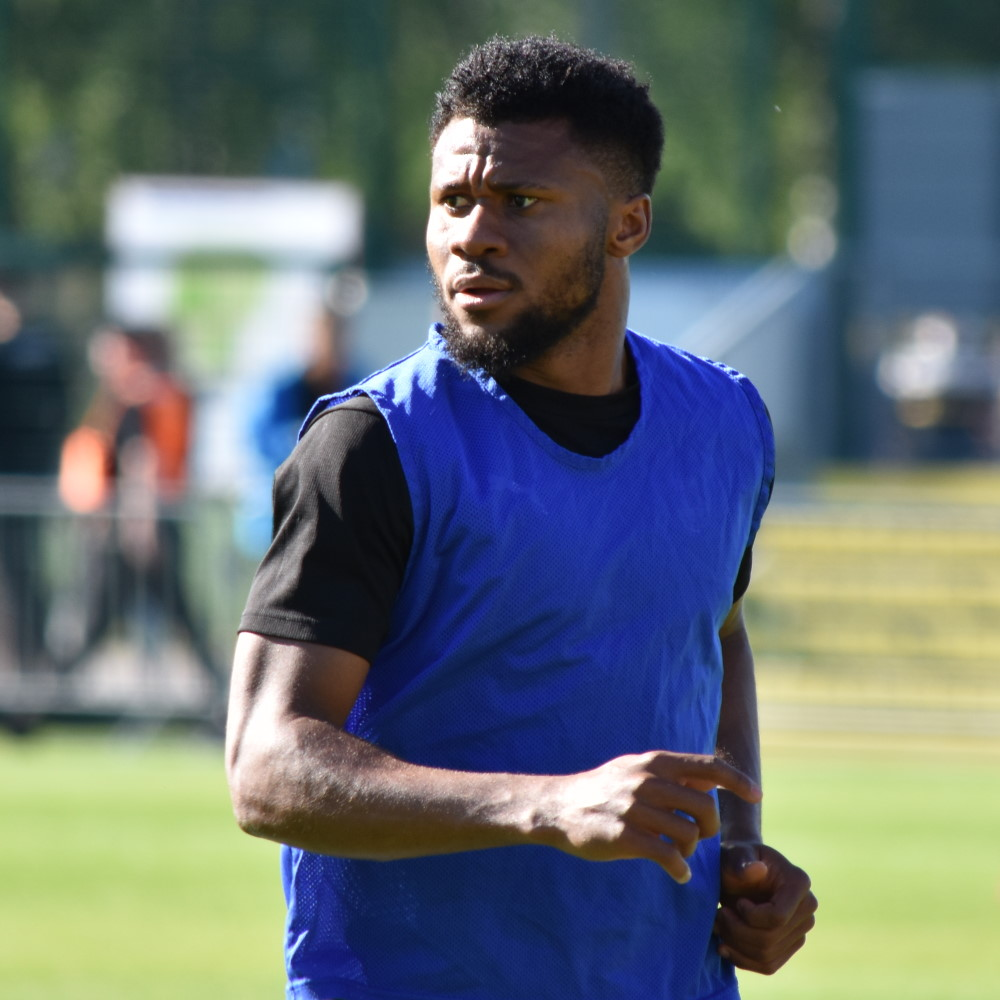
- Aniekpeno Udo with KuPS in 2020.

Personal information
- Full name: Aniekpeno Christopher Udo
- Date of birth: 11 November 1996 (age 30)
- Place of birth: Anua Offot, Uyo, Nigeria
- Height: 1.79 m (5 ft 10 in)
- Position: Forward

Youth career
- –2016: Akwa United

Senior career*
Years	Team	Apps	(Gls)
2016–2018	Viking	8	(1)
2017	→ Levanger (loan)	11	(1)
2017	→ Ljungskile (loan)	10	(5)
2018–2019	Ljungskile	40	(28)
2020–2021	KuPS	43	(10)
2022	Al-Kholood	17	(3)
2022–2023	Al-Jandal	31	(23)
2023–2024	Al-Suqoor		
- * Club domestic league appearances and goals as of 14:22, 1 November 2021 (UTC)

Aniekpeno Christopher Udo (born 11 November 1996) is a Nigerian footballer who plays as a forward.

== Career ==
Udo transferred to Norwegian Eliteserien club Viking from Akwa United in January 2016. He signed a four-year contract with the club. On 20 February 2017, Udo completed a loan move to Norwegian First Division side Levanger.

On 17 January 2022, Udo joined Saudi Arabian First Division League side Al-Kholood. On 26 August 2022, Udo joined Al-Jandal.

On 23 June 2023, Udo joined Al-Suqoor.

== Career statistics ==
As of match played 31 October 2021

Appearances and goals by club, season and competition
Club	Season	League			Cup		Continental		Total	
Club	Season	Division	Apps	Goals	Apps	Goals	Apps	Goals	Apps	Goals
Viking	2016	Eliteserien	3	0	2	1	—		5	1
Viking	2018	1. divisjon	5	1	0	0	—		5	1
Viking	Total		8	1	2	1	—		10	2
Levanger (loan)	2017	1. divisjon	11	1	3	2	—		14	3
Ljungskile (loan)	2017	Division 1	10	5	0	0	—		10	5
Ljungskile	2018	Division 1	13	10	0	0	—		13	10
Ljungskile	2019	Division 1	27	18	0	0	—		27	18
Ljungskile	Total		40	28	0	0	—		40	28
KuPS	2020	Veikkausliiga	21	7	7	4	4	2	32	13
KuPS	2021	Veikkausliiga	22	3	1	0	8	3	31	6
KuPS	Total		43	10	8	4	12	5	63	19
Career total			112	45	13	7	12	5	137	57
