= Kristian Novak =

Norwegian footballer (born 1998)

Personal information
- Full name: Kristian Sirum Novak
- Date of birth: 19 October 1998 (age 28)
- Height: 1.93 m (6 ft 4 in)
- Position: Defender

Youth career
- –2014: Austrått
- 2014–2016: Ålgård
- 2017: Viking

Senior career*
Years	Team	Apps	(Gls)
2014–2016	Ålgård	50	(4)
2018	Viking	0	(0)
2019	Sola	11	(0)
2019–2020	Grorud	23	(0)
2021–2022	Jerv	22	(0)
2022–2023	Östersund	15	(0)

International career
2017	Norway U19	3	(0)
- * Club domestic league appearances and goals as of 11 November 2023

Kristian Sirum Novak (born 19 October 1998) is a Norwegian footballer who plays as a defender.

== Career ==
Novak played youth football at Austrått and Ålgård, before starting his senior career with the latter in 2014. Ahead of the 2017 season, he joined Viking's youth setup. A year later he was promoted to the senior squad, but a knee injury kept him on the sideline for most of the 2018 season. In 2019, he moved to Sola, and then Grorud. After two seasons with Grorud, he signed a contract with Jerv in January 2021. On 3 April 2022, he made his Eliteserien debut in a 1–0 win against Strømsgodset.

== Personal life ==
He is the son of a Norwegian mother and Croatian father. He hails from Håbafjell in Sandnes and is the older brother of Norwegian international handballer Kristina Novak.
