= 2025–26 Norwegian Football Cup =

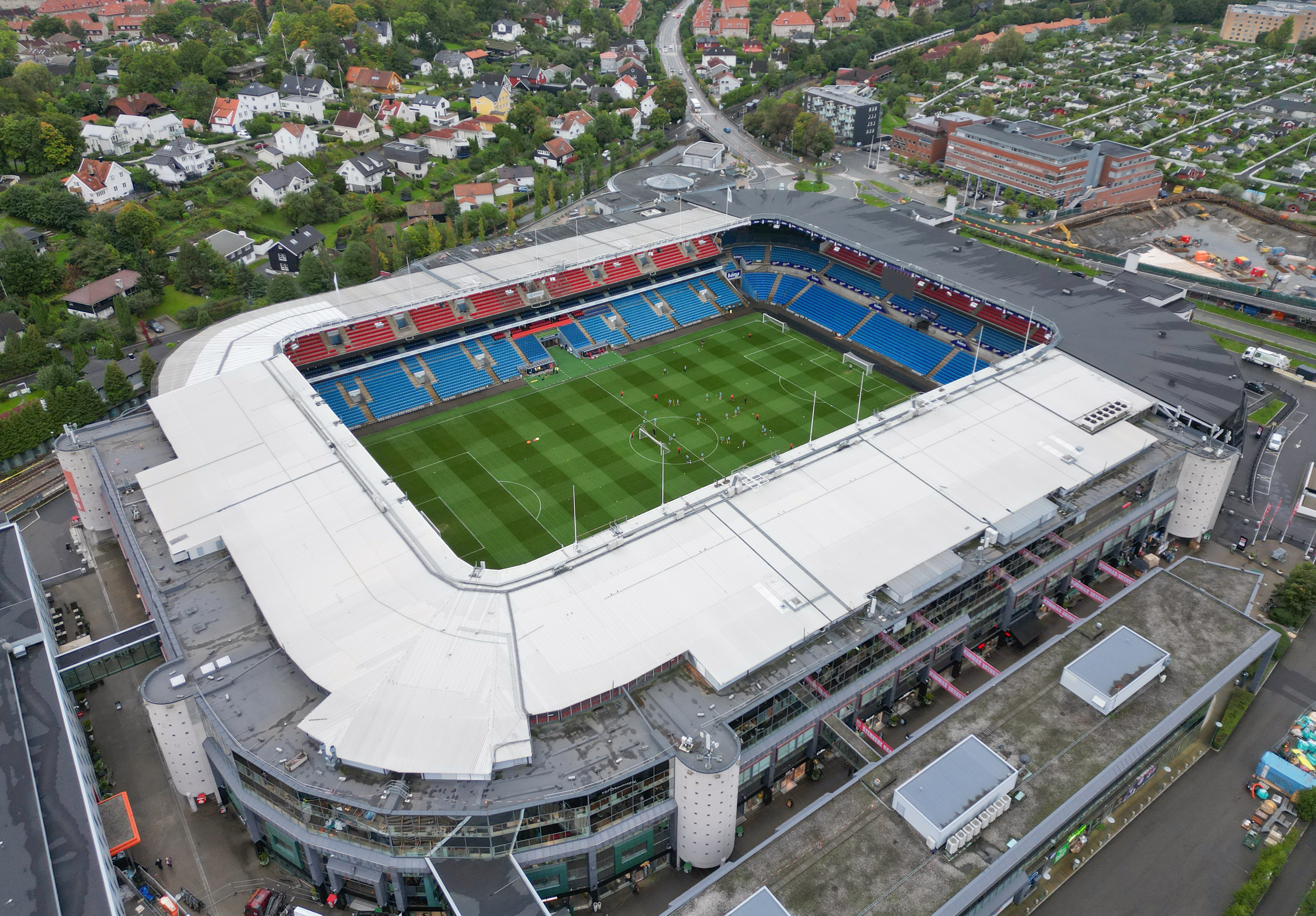
- Ullevaal Stadion hosted the final on 9 May 2026

Tournament details
- Country: Norway
- Dates: 13 August 2025 – 9 May 2026
- Teams: 80 (competition proper)

Final positions
- Champions: Bodø/Glimt (3rd title)
- Runners-up: Brann

Tournament statistics
- Matches played: 78
- Goals scored: 364 (4.67 per match)
- Top goal scorer(s): Axel Ahlander; Andreas Helmersen; Ole Sebastian Sundgot (4 goals each)

The 2025–26 Norwegian Football Cup was the 120th season of the Norwegian annual knock-out football tournament, and the first season since the competition was switched to an autumn–spring format. It started on 13 August 2025, and ended with the final on 9 May 2026.

Initially, the winners were set to play a qualifying play-off match against Lillestrøm – the winners of the 2025 Norwegian Football Cup – for a place in the 2026–27 Europa League play-off round. However, this play-off match will be cancelled as Bodø/Glimt ended up winning the 2025–26 cup; thus, Lillestrøm directly entered the 2026–27 Europa League play-off round.

As a transitional arrangement, the qualifying rounds and the first two main rounds were played without the 16 teams from the 2025 Eliteserien. For the third time in the tournament's history, the clubs from the top tier entered directly into the third round; the first two times were in 1998 and 2000, when there were 14 teams in the highest tier.

== Calendar ==
Below are the dates for each round as given by the official schedule (the clubs from Eliteserien entered the competition in the third round):

Round	Main date	Number of fixtures	Clubs
First round	13–14 August 2025	32	64 → 32
Second round	27 August 2025	16	32 → 16
Third round	17–24 September 2025	16	32 → 16
Fourth round	8 March 2026	8	16 → 8
Quarter-finals	18 March 2026	4	8 → 4
Semi-finals	22 April 2026	2	4 → 2
Final	9 May 2026	1	2 → 1

== First round ==
The pair-ups for the first round were announced on 30 June 2025.

Number of teams per tier entering this round
Eliteserien (1)	1. divisjon (2)	2. divisjon (3)	3. divisjon (4)	4. divisjon (5)	Total
0 / 16	16 / 16	27 / 27	16 / 58	5 / 139	64 / 256

13 August 2025	Førde (4)	0–2	(2) Hødd	Førde
17:30 CEST (UTC+2)		Report	Mikhail 5'; Holte 51'	Stadium: Førde stadion Referee: Freek Arjen van Herk

13 August 2025	Ulfstind (4)	4–3	(3) Alta	Tromsø
17:50 CEST (UTC+2)	Arntzen 11', 73', 76'; Løvland 63'	Report	Bello 53'; Jacobsen 61'; Larsen 79'	Stadium: Tønsnes kunstgressbane Referee: Øyvind Jøstensen

13 August 2025	Finnsnes (5)	0–8	(3) Tromsdalen	Finnsnes
18:00 CEST (UTC+2)		Report	Laugsand 6', 67' (pen.); Nilsen-Modebe 21' (pen.), 32'; Breivik 34'; Kristoffersen 78'; Jakobsen 90' (o.g.); Eliassen 90'	Stadium: Finnsnes Stadion; Referee: Magnus Henriksen Tjelle

13 August 2025	Junkeren (4)	3–1 (a.e.t.)	(3) Rana	Bodø
18:00 CEST (UTC+2)	Unhjem 47'; Chooly 101' (pen.); Halsøy 110'	Report	Andersen 90'	Stadium: Nordlandshallen; Referee: Andreas Flückiger

13 August 2025	Nardo (4)	0–6	(3) Levanger	Trondheim
18:00 CEST (UTC+2)		Report	Hagbø 15', 25', 32'; Høiseth 44', 67'; Sundnes 86'	Stadium: Phonereparatøren Arena; Referee: Bendik Haarberg

13 August 2025	Strindheim (3)	2–3	(3) Stjørdals-Blink	Trondheim
18:00 CEST (UTC+2)	Halgunset 19'; Gløsen 89'	Report	Aune 7'; Fossli 73', 83'	Stadium: Leangen Bolig Arena; Attendance: 175; Referee: Preben Øien

13 August 2025	Trygg/Lade (4)	2–1	(2) Ranheim	Trondheim
18:00 CEST (UTC+2)	Flotve 45' (pen.), 63'	Report	Wenaas 22'	Stadium: Obosbanen; Attendance: 100; Referee: Per Oscar Grov Heiberg

13 August 2025	Træff (3)	1–4	(2) Aalesund	Molde
18:00 CEST (UTC+2)	Gussiås 11'	Report	Melland 28'; Kjelsen 37'; Ørsahl 58'; Jóhannsson 88'	Stadium: Reknesbanen; Attendance: 310; Referee: Oliver Skaret Barsøe

13 August 2025	Spjelkavik (4)	2–4	(3) Brattvåg	Ålesund
18:00 CEST (UTC+2)	Dubicki 39'; Televik 70'	Report	Tveiten 15'; Syversen 34'; Dahle 45'; Halvorsen 84' (o.g.)	Stadium: Spjelkavik stadion Attendance: 180; Referee: Torgeir Halsen

13 August 2025	Lysekloster (3)	3–0	(3) Sandviken	Søvik
18:00 CEST (UTC+2)	Tufta 50', 90'; Bolsø 85'	Report		Stadium: Lysekloster Family Arena; Attendance: 350; Referee: Mattias Gripsgård Sakstad

13 August 2025	Gneist (4)	2–3	(2) Åsane	Bergen
18:00 CEST (UTC+2)	Sagstad 52' (pen.); Holst 57'	Report	Myklebust 17', 45'; Fismen 40'	Stadium: Liland Kunstgress; Referee: Aleksander Skjold Vermundsen

13 August 2025	Bjarg (4)	2–0	(2) Sogndal	Bergen
18:00 CEST (UTC+2)	Halset 25'; Ahlander 45'	Report		Stadium: Stavollen Kunstgress; Referee: Sondre Brudvik

13 August 2025	Djerv 1919 (4)	2–2 (a.e.t.) (5–4 p)	(3) Sotra	Haugesund
18:00 CEST (UTC+2)	Fjeldstad 9'; Agano 100'	Report; Penalties	Høviskeland 81', 105'	Stadium: Djervbanen; Referee: Ola Kellerhals
	Penalties
	Johannesen (penalty scored); Andersen (penalty scored); Agano (penalty missed); Rullestad (penalty scored); Ndayisenga (penalty scored); Wojtyszyn (penalty scored)		(penalty scored) Kilen; (penalty scored) Tørum; (penalty scored) Mvuka; (penalty scored) Ree; (penalty missed) Høviskeland; (penalty missed) Johansen

13 August 2025	Madla (4)	1–2	(3) Sandnes Ulf	Stavanger
18:00 CEST (UTC+2)	Memed 33'	Report	Saugestad 58'; Berger 80'	Stadium: Madla Handelslag Stadion; Attendance: 200; Referee: Amir Ajjour

13 August 2025	Vidar (4)	1–4 (a.e.t.)	(3) Vard Haugesund	Stavanger
18:00 CEST (UTC+2)	Dirdal 59'	Report	Dvergsdal 73', 118'; Brandeggen 102'; Lille-Løve 113' (pen.)	Stadium: Logitrans banen Attendance: 75; Referee: Hussain Hamid Al-Kharasani

13 August 2025	Vigør (5)	0–3	(2) Start	Kristiansand
18:00 CEST (UTC+2)		Report	Apland 13'; A. E. Nilsen 45'; Adebayo 78'	Stadium: Macron Arena Hellemyr; Referee: Javi Jean-Marc Conny Leo Mertens

13 August 2025	Fløy (3)	1–2	(2) Egersund	Kristiansand
18:00 CEST (UTC+2)	Frostad 90'	Report	Rogulj 15'; Tornvig 75'	Stadium: Cemo Arena; Referee: Jørgen Haga

13 August 2025	Arendal (3)	3–2 (a.e.t.)	(3) Jerv	Arendal
18:00 CEST (UTC+2)	Østerud 24'; Helgesen 90'; Trengereid 120'	Report	Richstad 60'; Hestad 79'	Stadium: Norac stadion Referee: Håvard Bjerkelund

13 August 2025	Pors (3)	1–3	(2) Odd	Porsgrunn
18:00 CEST (UTC+2)	Bakeng-Rogne 31'	Report	Kojo 11'; Bonnesen 16'; Jørgensen 24'	Stadium: Urædd Kunstgress; Referee: Haakon Bue

13 August 2025	Vestfossen (5)	1–5	(2) Mjøndalen	Vestfossen
18:00 CEST (UTC+2)	Bjørnstad 68'	Report	Reuterswärd 33'; Bruusgaard 50', 57', 61'; Ogboji 66'	Stadium: RVS Parken Vestfossen gress Referee: Lars Bratteli Jacobsen

13 August 2025	Hønefoss (3)	3–0	(2) Raufoss	Hønefoss
18:00 CEST (UTC+2)	Elvevold 45'; Holte 48'; Bonde 55' (o.g.)	Report		Stadium: AKA Arena; Attendance: 733; Referee: Arion Shaqiri

13 August 2025	Brumunddal (5)	1–5	(2) Kongsvinger	Brumunddal
18:00 CEST (UTC+2)	Nordeng 41'	Report	Christiansen 17', 45'; Damhaug 25'; Vinjor 48'; Grundt 71'	Stadium: SH-banen; Referee: Jonas Weiberg Sture

13 August 2025	Ull/Kisa (3)	0–2 (a.e.t.)	(3) Strømmen	Jessheim
18:00 CEST (UTC+2)		Report	Somesi 96'; Åsvestad 103'	Stadium: Jessheim Stadion; Attendance: 317; Referee: Johan William Grundt

13 August 2025	Gamle Oslo (4)	2–1	(3) Eidsvold Turn	Oslo
18:00 CEST (UTC+2)	Jatta 17'; Ness 90'	Report	Kaba 83'	Stadium: Haugerud kunstgress Referee: Batuhan Boyar

13 August 2025	Kjelsås (3)	1–0	(3) Grorud	Oslo
18:00 CEST (UTC+2)	Holter 68'	Report		Stadium: Grefsen Stadion; Attendance: 645; Referee: Pavel Breivik

13 August 2025	Bærum (4)	0–5	(2) Stabæk	Sandvika
18:00 CEST (UTC+2)		Report	Fardal Opseth 16'; Vinge 32'; Cedergren 66'; Ellegaard 68'; Geelmuyden 86'	Stadium: AJ Arena; Attendance: 867; Referee: Satha Sejoohn Sritharan

13 August 2025	Asker (3)	3–0	(2) Skeid	Asker
18:00 CEST (UTC+2)	Sesay 11', 19'; Kenyi 72'	Report		Stadium: Føyka Stadion; Referee: Markus Rotvold Hammarstrøm

13 August 2025	Follo (3)	6–2	(3) Notodden	Ski
18:00 CEST (UTC+2)	Hennig 36'; Jorde 45'; Gavey 47', 49'; Ottesen 79'; Tøgersen 90'	Report	Mann 42'; Ullenes 59'	Stadium: Ski Stadion; Attendance: 175; Referee: Jonas Johnsen

13 August 2025	Råde (5)	0–1	(2) Moss	Råde
18:00 CEST (UTC+2)		Report	Mayonga 11'	Stadium: Råde idrettspark Referee: Herman Leiulfsrud Aass

13 August 2025	Lørenskog (4)	1–4	(2) Lillestrøm	Lørenskog
18:00 CEST (UTC+2)	Harvey 41'	Report	Diop 18'; Woxen 50'; Svenningsen 53'; Wæhler 79'	Stadium: Rolvsrud stadion Attendance: 1,030; Referee: Hakan Catalgøl

13 August 2025	Nordstrand (4)	1–3	(2) Lyn	Oslo
18:00 CEST (UTC+2)	Loulanti 34'	Report	Wroll-Evensen 8'; Ingebrigtsen 57'; Hellum 71'	Stadium: Nordstrand kunstgress Attendance: 657; Referee: Eirik Wisted-Thu

14 August 2025	Flint (4)	0–1	(3) Eik Tønsberg	Tønsberg
18:00 CEST (UTC+2)		Report	Danielsen 7'	Stadium: Flint ESSO Arena; Attendance: 1,450; Referee: Aland Bazaz

== Second round ==
The pair-ups for the second round were announced on 14 August 2025.

Number of teams per tier entering this round
Eliteserien (1)	1. divisjon (2)	2. divisjon (3)	3. divisjon (4)	4. divisjon (5)	Total
0 / 16	12 / 16	14 / 27	6 / 58	0 / 139	32 / 260

27 August 2025	Follo (3)	0–2	(2) Lyn	Ski
17:30 CEST (UTC+2)		Report	Laghzaoui 16'; Olsen 50'	Stadium: Ski Stadion; Attendance: 301; Referee: Abdulhadi Al-Fahad

27 August 2025	Ulfstind (4)	2–5	(3) Tromsdalen	Tromsø
18:00 CEST (UTC+2)	Skoglund 54', 82' (pen.)	Report	Skogvoll 48', 80'; Selnes 51'; Adolfsen 88'; Sandbukt 90+5'	Stadium: Tønsnes kunstgressbane Referee: Egil Bertheussen

27 August 2025	Junkeren (4)	0–4	(2) Kongsvinger	Bodø
18:00 CEST (UTC+2)		Report	Haren 41'; Christiansen 74'; Flores 80'; Holtan 90+1'	Stadium: Nordlandshallen; Referee: Oliver Skaret Barsøe

27 August 2025	Stjørdals-Blink (3)	1–2	(2) Aalesund	Stjørdalshalsen
18:00 CEST (UTC+2)	Rolstad 50'	Report	Ørsahl 43'; Heiselberg 68'	Stadium: TMT Stadion Sandskogan; Attendance: 571; Referee: Per Oscar Grov Heiberg

27 August 2025	Trygg/Lade (4)	1–3	(3) Levanger	Førde
18:00 CEST (UTC+2)	Vollan 39'	Report	Horten 26', 64'; Olsen 35'	Stadium: Obosbanen; Referee: Preben Øien

27 August 2025	Brattvåg (3)	4–4 (a.e.t.) (5–3 p)	(2) Hødd	Brattvåg
18:00 CEST (UTC+2)	Solnørdal 48' (pen.); Stølan 89'; Syversen 90'; Nytoft 110'	Report; Penalties	Riise 4'; Holte 24'; Roppen 87'; Blikstad 105'	Stadium: Brattvåg stadion Referee: Marius Hansen Grøtta
	Penalties
	Solnørdal (penalty scored); Stølan (penalty scored); Flem (penalty scored); Nytoft (penalty scored); Galta (penalty scored)		(penalty scored) Blikstad; (penalty scored) Mikhail; (penalty missed) Robertsen; (penalty scored) Holte

27 August 2025	Lysekloster (3)	3–0	(2) Åsane	Søvik
18:00 CEST (UTC+2)	Aaserud 3'; Kvarven 78', 86'	Report		Stadium: Lysekloster Family Arena; Attendance: 434; Referee: Amir Ajjour

27 August 2025	Bjarg (4)	2–1	(3) Vard Haugesund	Bergen
18:00 CEST (UTC+2)	Jørgensen 16'; Ahlander 88' (pen.)	Report	Lille-Løve 70'	Stadium: Stavollen Kunstgress; Referee: Jørgen Haga

27 August 2025	Djerv 1919 (4)	2–6	(3) Sandnes Ulf	Haugesund
18:00 CEST (UTC+2)	Niyonzima 31'; Johannesen 75'	Report	Sundgot 21', 45', 81', 86'; Aune 53'; Pereira 90'	Stadium: Djervbanen; Referee: Mischa Kellerhals

27 August 2025	Arendal (3)	2–3 (a.e.t.)	(2) Egersund	Arendal
18:00 CEST (UTC+2)	Løvseth 29'; C´uric 89'	Report	Rogulj 16'; Håheim-Elveseter 58'; Abu 96'	Stadium: Norac stadion Attendance: 500; Referee: Hussain Hamid Al-Kharasani

27 August 2025	Eik Tønsberg (3)	3–0	(2) Start	Tønsberg
18:00 CEST (UTC+2)	Muhle 59', 69'; Gojani 71'	Report		Stadium: Tønsberg Gressbane; Referee: Magnus Nicolai Koløy

27 August 2025	Strømmen (3)	2–2 (a.e.t.) (2–4 p)	(2) Odd	Strømmen
18:00 CEST (UTC+2)	Åsvestad 42'; Solli 67'	Report; Penalties	Salmon 5'; Hagen 90+1'	Stadium: Strømmen Stadion; Attendance: 223; Referee: Herman Holthe
	Penalties
	Paulsen (penalty missed); Hristov (penalty missed); Lillo (penalty scored); Solberg (penalty scored)		(penalty scored) Hagen; (penalty scored) Aas; (penalty missed) Harðarson; (penalty scored) Walstad; (penalty scored) Salmon

27 August 2025	Gamle Oslo (4)	1–4	(2) Stabæk	Oslo
18:00 CEST (UTC+2)	Sørlie 89'	Report	Ekorness 15'; Olderheim 52'; Ellegaard 55'; Wendt 90+4'	Stadium: KFUM Arena; Referee: Eivind Bodding

27 August 2025	Kjelsås (3)	2–1	(2) Moss	Oslo
18:00 CEST (UTC+2)	Berge 32'; Broch 45+2'	Report	Fuglestad 6'	Stadium: Grefsen Stadion; Attendance: 390; Referee: Sander Magdalon Bråten Johannessen

27 August 2025	Asker (3)	1–4	(2) Mjøndalen	Asker
18:00 CEST (UTC+2)	Johansen 76'	Report	Midtgård 16', 25'; Sætherbø 32'; Bratvold 77'	Stadium: Føyka Stadion; Attendance: 212; Referee: Haakon Bue

27 August 2025	Hønefoss (3)	2–3	(2) Lillestrøm	Hønefoss
20:15 CEST (UTC+2)	Elvevold 58'; Holte 90+4'	Report	Elkær 74'; Karlsbakk 78'; Woxen 90+2'	Stadium: AKA Arena; Attendance: 1,024; Referee: Johan William Grundt

== Third round ==
The pair-ups for the third round were announced on 27 August 2025.

Number of teams per tier entering this round
Eliteserien (1)	1. divisjon (2)	2. divisjon (3)	3. divisjon (4)	4. divisjon (5)	Total
16 / 16	8 / 16	7 / 27	1 / 58	0 / 139	32 / 260

17 September 2025	Tromsdalen (3)	6–1	(1) Sandefjord	Tromsø
18:00 CEST (UTC+2)	Pedersen 18' (pen.), 59'; Aarflot 28', 66'; L. Nilsen 70'; Sandbukt 86'	Report	Berntsen 55'	Stadium: TUIL Arena; Attendance: 636; Referee: Ali al Hatam

17 September 2025	Kongsvinger (2)	1–3	(1) KFUM	Kongsvinger
18:00 CEST (UTC+2)	Haren 68'	Report	Njie 9'; Lysgård 75' (o.g.); Kristensen 78'	Stadium: Gjemselund; Attendance: 877; Referee: Marius Lien

17 September 2025	Mjøndalen (2)	1–5	(1) Brann	Mjøndalen
18:00 CEST (UTC+2)	Wæhler 38'	Report	Boakye 1'; Hansen 16'; Dragsnes 45'; De Roeve 48'; Finne 74'	Stadium: Consto Arena; Attendance: 1,237; Referee: Christian Moen

23 September 2025	Vålerenga (1)	1–2	(1) Fredrikstad	Oslo
18:00 CEST (UTC+2)	Strand 90+7'	Report	Eid 20'; Skogvold 90+8'	Stadium: Intility Arena; Attendance: 6,540; Referee: Sivert Øksnes Amland

24 September 2025	Tromsø (1)	2–1	(1) Kristiansund	Tromsø
18:00 CEST (UTC+2)	Braut 25', 38'	Report	Kilen 90+1'	Stadium: Romssa Arena; Attendance: 1,104; Referee: Stian Røvig Sletner

24 September 2025	Strømsgodset (1)	1–1 (a.e.t.) (3–5 p)	(1) Molde	Drammen
18:00 CEST (UTC+2)	Wikheim 55'	Report; Penalties	Abdullai 36'	Stadium: Marienlyst Stadion; Attendance: 1,312; Referee: Kristoffer Hagenes
	Penalties
	Stengel (penalty scored); Vilsvik (penalty scored); Valsvik (penalty missed); Farji (penalty scored)		(penalty scored) Gulbrandsen; (penalty scored) Eikrem; (penalty scored) Hestad; (penalty scored) Roaldsøy; (penalty scored) Breivik

24 September 2025	Lysekloster (3)	1–3	(2) Aalesund	Søvik
18:00 CEST (UTC+2)	Tufta 3'	Report	Ngongo 9' (pen.), 70'; Snær Johannson 81'	Stadium: Lysekloster Family Arena; Attendance: 796; Referee: Jørgen Haugen

24 September 2025	Haugesund (1)	1–4 (a.e.t.)	(1) Rosenborg	Haugesund
18:00 CEST (UTC+2)	Grindhaug 57'	Report	Islamović 90+4', 107'; Dahl Reitan 94', 98'	Stadium: Haugesund Sparebank Arena; Attendance: 1,045; Referee: Ola Hobber Nilsen

24 September 2025	Bjarg (4)	6–1	(2) Stabæk	Bergen
18:00 CEST (UTC+2)	Ahlander 9', 64'; Hopsdal 19'; Halset 49'; Jørgensen 59'; Ahmer 87'	Report	Dahlby 29'	Stadium: Stavollen Kunstgress; Referee: Mischa Huru Kellerhals

24 September 2025	Kjelsås (3)	5–5 (a.e.t.) (5–6 p)	(1) Sarpsborg 08	Oslo
18:00 CEST (UTC+2)	Holter 3'; Askengren 65'; Aslaksrud 90+1' (pen.); Halvorsen 93', 106' (pen.)	Report; Penalties	Nibe 17'; Sanyang 20', 97'; Gudjohnsen 23'; Koch 62'	Stadium: Grefsen Stadion; Attendance: 531; Referee: Daniel Higraff
	Penalties
	Aslaksrud (penalty scored); Berge (penalty scored); Holter (penalty scored); Meinseth (penalty scored); Vassdal (penalty scored); Lamin (penalty missed)		(penalty scored) Reinhardsen; (penalty scored) Sanyang; (penalty scored) Jeahze; (penalty scored) Sher; (penalty scored) Koch; (penalty scored) Tangen

24 September 2025	Sandnes Ulf (3)	1–2	(2) Lillestrøm	Sandnes
18:00 CEST (UTC+2)	Pereira 41'	Report	Woxen 32'; Vá 52'	Stadium: Øster Hus Arena; Attendance: 872; Referee: Svein Tore Sinnes

24 September 2025	Brattvåg (3)	1–2	(1) Bryne	Brattvåg
18:00 CEST (UTC+2)	Solnørdal 75'	Report	Håland 12'; Strunck 90+4'	Stadium: Brattvåg stadion Attendance: 571; Referee: Mohammad Usman Aslam

24 September 2025	Eik Tønsberg (3)	0–2	(1) Viking	Tønsberg
18:00 CEST (UTC+2)		Report	Vevatne 16'; N. Nilsen 47' (o.g.)	Stadium: Tønsberg Gressbane; Attendance: 2,293; Referee: Marius Lien

24 September 2025	Egersund (2)	0–1	(2) Lyn	Egersund
		Report	Bydal 73'	Stadium: B&G Parken; Referee: Tore Hansen
Note: Egersund delivered a formal protest and demanded a rematch because the ball touched the referee Tore Hansen prior to Lyn's winning goal. The Norwegian Football Association decided to replay the match on 15 November.

25 September 2025	Odd (2)	1–3	(1) Bodø/Glimt	Skien
20:00 CEST (UTC+2)	Hagen 51'	Report	Riisnæs 48'; Helmersen 62'; Hauge 90+6'	Stadium: Skagerak Arena; Attendance: 6,278; Referee: Sigurd Kringstad

8 October 2025	Levanger (3)	1–5	(1) HamKam	Levanger
18:00 CEST (UTC+2)	Moen 86'	Report	Lien 1', 67', 90'; Ekeroth 13', 69'	Stadium: TOBB Arena Levanger; Attendance: 433; Referee: Magnus Nicolai Koløy
Note: The match was originally scheduled on 24 September 2025, but was postponed due to the floodlights problems.

=== Replay ===
15 November 2025	Egersund (2)	3–2	(2) Lyn	Egersund
15:00 CET (UTC+1)	Tornvig 22'; Kapskarmo 77'; Vatne 90+6'	Report	Hellum 40', 45'	Stadium: B&G Parken; Attendance: 852; Referee: Svein Tore Sinnes

== Fourth round ==
The pair-ups for the fourth round were announced on 25 September 2025.

Number of teams per tier entering this round (Note: Based on the 2025 season.)
Eliteserien (1)	1. divisjon (2)	2. divisjon (3)	3. divisjon (4)	4. divisjon (5)	Total
11 / 16	3 / 16	1 / 27	1 / 58	0 / 139	16 / 260

5 March 2026	Molde (1)	1–2	(1) Bodø/Glimt	Molde
19:00 CET (UTC+1)	Breivik 69'	Report	Auklend 32', 73'	Stadium: Aker Stadion; Attendance: 3,986; Referee: Ola Hobber Nilsen

7 March 2026	KFUM (1)	2–1	(1) Tromsø	Oslo
14:00 CET (UTC+1)	Haltvik 16', 57'	Report	Braut 33'	Stadium: KFUM Arena; Attendance: 1,154; Referee: Tore Hansen

7 March 2026	Bjarg (4)	0–3	(1) Viking	Bergen
16:00 CET (UTC+1)		Report	Mikaelsson 37' (pen.); Haugen 84'; Alte 87'	Stadium: Stavollen Kunstgress; Attendance: 2,000; Referee: Ola Hobber Nilsen

7 March 2026	HamKam (1)	0–2	(2) Lillestrøm	Hamar
18:00 CET (UTC+1)		Report	Vá 90'; Lehne Olsen 90+5'	Stadium: Briskeby Stadion; Attendance: 2,570; Referee: Sivert Øksnes Amland

8 March 2026	Tromsdalen (3)	2–3 (a.e.t.)	(1) Brann	Tromsø
14:00 CET (UTC+1)	Hafstad 53'; Halvorsen 89'	Report	Myhre 22'; Þorsteinsson 59'; Sørensen 114'	Stadium: TUIL Arena; Attendance: 1,003; Referee: Christian Moen

8 March 2026	Bryne (1)	4–2 (a.e.t.)	(1) Rosenborg	Bryne
16:00 CET (UTC+1)	Scriven 3'; Jonassen 90+5', 117'; Strunck 104'	Report	Konradsen 9'; Chiakha 31'	Stadium: Bryne Stadion; Attendance: 1,691; Referee: Kristoffer Hagenes

8 March 2026	Fredrikstad (1)	2–1	(1) Sarpsborg 08	Fredrikstad
18:00 CET (UTC+1)	Holmé 6'; Skogvold 79'	Report	Sørli 32'	Stadium: Fredrikstad Stadion; Attendance: 8,723; Referee: Rohit Saggi

9 March 2026	Egersund (2)	2–3	(2) Aalesund	Egersund
19:00 CET (UTC+1)	Kapskarmo 8'; Vatne 69'	Report	Lonebu 21' (pen.); Myrlid 81'; Djantou 85'	Stadium: B&G Parken; Attendance: 807; Referee: Marius Lien

== Quarter-finals ==
The pair-ups for the quarter-finals were announced on 8 March 2026.

Number of teams per tier entering this round
Eliteserien (1)	1. divisjon (2)	2. divisjon (3)	3. divisjon (4)	4. divisjon (5)	Total
6 / 16	2 / 16	0 / 27	0 / 58	0 / 139	8 / 260

18 March 2026	Viking (1)	1–2	(2) Aalesund	Stavanger
18:00 CET (UTC+1)	Visted 15'	Report	Andresen 65'; Christensen 75'	Stadium: Viking Stadion; Attendance: 7,120; Referee: Ola Hobber Nilsen

19 March 2026	KFUM (1)	3–2	(1) Fredrikstad	Oslo
18:00 CET (UTC+1)	Hjorth 2'; Sørås 3'; Kristensen 65'	Report	Sørløkk 22', 53'	Stadium: KFUM Arena; Attendance: 1,644; Referee: Mohammad Usman Aslam

19 March 2026	Bryne (1)	1–2	(1) Brann	Bryne
20:00 CET (UTC+1)	Strunck 15' (pen.)	Report	Sørensen 22'; Holm 58'	Stadium: Bryne Stadion; Attendance: 2,274; Referee: Marius Hansen Grøtta

22 March 2026	Bodø/Glimt (1)	4–0	(2) Lillestrøm	Bodø
19:15 CET (UTC+1)	Høgh 38', 59'; Auklend 48'; Evjen 52'	Report		Stadium: Aspmyra Stadion; Attendance: 4,011; Referee: Daniel Higraff

== Semi-finals ==
The pair-ups for the semi-finals were announced on 22 March 2026.

Number of teams per tier entering this round
Eliteserien (1)	1. divisjon (2)	2. divisjon (3)	3. divisjon (4)	4. divisjon (5)	Total
3 / 16	1 / 16	0 / 28	0 / 84	0 / 272	4 / 416

22 April 2026	Bodø/Glimt (1)	2–1 (a.e.t.)	(1) KFUM	Bodø
18:00 CEST (UTC+2)	Schneider 61' (o.g.); Helmersen 118'	Report	Sjøkvist 34' (pen.)	Stadium: Aspmyra Stadion; Attendance: 5,020; Referee: Sivert Øksnes Amland

22 April 2026	Brann (1)	2–1	(2) Aalesund	Bergen
20:00 CEST (UTC+2)	Haram 10' (o.g.); Mathisen 39'	Report	Hagen 78'	Stadium: Brann Stadion; Attendance: 16,188; Referee: Espen Eskås

== Final ==
The final was played on 9 May 2026.

9 May 2026
16:00 CET (UTC+1)

Bodø/Glimt	3–3 (a.e.t.)	Brann
Pedersen 7' (o.g.); Brynhildsen 86'; Helmersen 110'	Report	Myhre 39'; Ingason 40'; Soltvedt 118' (pen.)
Penalties
Helmersen (penalty scored); Evjen (penalty scored); Bjørtuft (penalty scored); Sjøvold (penalty scored)	4–2	(penalty missed) Soltvedt; (penalty scored) Myhre; (penalty scored) Wassberg; (penalty missed) Haaland

Ullevaal Stadion, Oslo
Attendance: 24,636
Referee: Marius Hansen Grøtta (Malmefjorden)

== Top scorers ==
Rank	Player	Club	Goals
1	(Norway) Axel Ahlander	Bjarg	4
1	(Norway) Andreas Helmersen	Bodø/Glimt	4
1	(Norway) Ole Sebastian Sundgot	Sandnes Ulf	4
4	16 players		3
