= 2025 Norwegian Second Division =

Norwegian football season

Norwegian Second Division
- Season: 2025
- Dates: 29 March – 25 October
- Champions: Sandnes Ulf; Strømmen
- Promoted: Sandnes Ulf; Strømmen
- Relegated: Alta; Asker; Brann 2 Fløy; Strindheim; Vard Haugesund
- Matches: 364
- Goals: 1,284 (3.53 per match)
- Top goalscorer: Ole Sebastian Sundgot (24 goals)
- Biggest home win: Arendal 9–0 Fløy (27 September 2025)
- Biggest away win: Asker 0–5 Alta (20 September 2025)
- Highest scoring: Kjelsås 6–4 Alta (25 October 2025)

The 2025 Norwegian Second Division (referred to as PostNord-ligaen for sponsorship reasons) was a Norwegian football third-tier league season. The league consists of 28 teams divided into two groups of 14 teams.

The league was played as a double round-robin tournament, where all teams play 26 matches. The season started on 29 March 2025 and ended on 25 October 2025, not including play-off matches.

== Team changes ==
| Teams IN | | Teams OUT | |
| Promoted from 2024 Third Division | Relegated from 2024 First Division | Promoted from 2024 Second Division | Relegated from 2024 Second Division |
|---|---|---|---|
| Asker; Hønefoss; Pors; Rana; Sandviken; Træff | Levanger; Sandnes Ulf | Hødd; Skeid | Gjøvik-Lyn; Junkeren; Kvik Halden; Viking 2 Vålerenga 2 Ørn-Horten |

== Group 1 ==
=== Teams ===
Locations of the teams in Group 1 of the 2025 Norwegian Second Division

The following 14 clubs competed in Group 1:

| Club | Municipality | Stadium | Capacity |
|---|---|---|---|
| Arendal | Arendal | Norac Stadion | 5,000 |
| Brann 2 | Bergen | Varden Amfi | 3,500 |
| Brattvåg | Ålesund | Brattvåg Stadion | 2,000 |
| Eik Tønsberg | Tønsberg | Tønsberg Gressbane | 5,500 |
| Fløy | Kristiansand | Cemo Arena | 2,000 |
| Jerv | Grimstad | Levermyr Stadion | 3,300 |
| Lysekloster | Bjørnafjorden | Lysekloster Family Arena | 1,500 |
| Notodden | Notodden | Notodden Kunstgress | 1,700 |
| Pors | Porsgrunn | Pors Stadion | 3,700 |
| Sandnes Ulf | Sandnes | Øster Hus Arena | 6,043 |
| Sandviken | Bergen | Stemmemyren | 1,500 |
| Sotra | Øygarden | Straume Idrettspark | 1,200 |
| Træff | Molde | Reknesbanen | 1,500 |
| Vard Haugesund | Haugesund | Haugesund Sparebank Arena | 8,754 |

=== League table ===
| Pos | Team | Pld | W | D | L | GF | GA | GD | Pts | Promotion, qualification or relegation |
|---|---|---|---|---|---|---|---|---|---|---|
| 1 | Sandnes Ulf (C, P) | 26 | 16 | 6 | 4 | 72 | 30 | +42 | 54 | Promotion to First Division |
| 2 | Brattvåg | 26 | 14 | 6 | 6 | 64 | 46 | +18 | 48 | Qualification for promotion play-offs |
| 3 | Sotra | 26 | 13 | 6 | 7 | 48 | 26 | +22 | 45 | |
| 4 | Jerv | 26 | 13 | 5 | 8 | 47 | 42 | +5 | 44 | |
| 5 | Arendal | 26 | 10 | 11 | 5 | 59 | 36 | +23 | 41 | |
| 6 | Eik Tønsberg (Note: Eik Tønsberg were deducted 1 point.) | 26 | 9 | 9 | 8 | 36 | 36 | 0 | 35 | |
| 7 | Lysekloster | 26 | 9 | 7 | 10 | 39 | 35 | +4 | 34 | |
| 8 | Pors | 26 | 7 | 10 | 9 | 40 | 48 | −8 | 31 | |
| 9 | Sandviken | 26 | 8 | 7 | 11 | 38 | 49 | −11 | 31 | |
| 10 | Træff | 26 | 7 | 9 | 10 | 34 | 41 | −7 | 30 | |
| 11 | Notodden | 26 | 6 | 10 | 10 | 34 | 50 | −16 | 28 | |
| 12 | Brann 2 (R) | 26 | 8 | 4 | 14 | 37 | 62 | −25 | 28 | Relegation to Third Division |
| 13 | Vard Haugesund (R) | 26 | 5 | 11 | 10 | 37 | 46 | −9 | 26 | Relegation to Third Division |
| 14 | Fløy (R) | 26 | 3 | 7 | 16 | 29 | 67 | −38 | 16 | Relegation to Third Division |

Source: NIFS (in Norwegian)
Rules for classification: 1) Points; 2) Goal difference; 3) Goals scored; 4) Head-to-head points; 5) Head-to-head goal difference; 6) Head-to-head goals scored.
(C) Champions; (P) Promoted; (R) Relegated

=== Results ===
| Home \ Away | ARE | BRN | BRT | EIK | FLØ | JER | LYS | NOT | POR | ULF | SAN | SOT | TRÆ | VAR |
|---|---|---|---|---|---|---|---|---|---|---|---|---|---|---|
| Arendal | — | 6–1 | 3–3 | 1–1 | 9–0 | 3–1 | 3–2 | 4–1 | 3–1 | 3–3 | 6–1 | 1–1 | 1–0 | 0–0 |
| Brann 2 | 1–1 | — | 4–3 | 2–2 | 4–3 | 2–4 | 0–4 | 2–1 | 0–2 | 2–1 | 2–0 | 0–2 | 1–2 | 2–1 |
| Brattvåg | 2–0 | 3–2 | — | 1–0 | 3–3 | 2–3 | 2–0 | 3–0 | 4–1 | 2–5 | 2–1 | 2–0 | 4–2 | 2–0 |
| Eik Tønsberg | 1–3 | 0–0 | 1–1 | — | 2–0 | 2–3 | 0–0 | 1–1 | 4–4 | 3–1 | 3–0 | 2–1 | 2–0 | 1–1 |
| Fløy | 1–1 | 1–1 | 2–4 | 0–2 | — | 1–1 | 3–1 | 2–2 | 0–3 | 0–2 | 2–1 | 1–2 | 3–0 | 2–2 |
| Jerv | 1–1 | 2–1 | 4–3 | 4–1 | 3–0 | — | 0–1 | 2–2 | 1–1 | 1–3 | 1–2 | 2–0 | 2–0 | 2–1 |
| Lysekloster | 2–1 | 3–2 | 1–2 | 1–2 | 3–0 | 3–0 | — | 0–0 | 1–3 | 2–3 | 1–1 | 0–0 | 1–1 | 1–0 |
| Notodden | 1–1 | 3–0 | 2–4 | 0–1 | 1–0 | 2–3 | 0–2 | — | 2–1 | 0–4 | 0–1 | 1–1 | 4–3 | 2–1 |
| Pors | 1–0 | 2–1 | 1–1 | 0–2 | 0–0 | 2–2 | 2–1 | 2–2 | — | 4–2 | 1–1 | 0–2 | 1–1 | 1–2 |
| Sandnes Ulf | 4–1 | 5–0 | 2–2 | 3–1 | 3–0 | 4–0 | 0–0 | 7–0 | 2–1 | — | 5–1 | 0–0 | 1–1 | 4–0 |
| Sandviken | 1–1 | 1–2 | 2–4 | 2–0 | 5–3 | 2–1 | 2–1 | 2–2 | 5–2 | 0–2 | — | 2–1 | 1–2 | 1–1 |
| Sotra | 3–1 | 5–0 | 2–1 | 4–0 | 6–1 | 2–1 | 2–3 | 1–3 | 5–0 | 1–2 | 2–2 | — | 0–0 | 1–0 |
| Træff | 1–1 | 3–4 | 1–0 | 1–1 | 2–0 | 0–1 | 2–1 | 1–1 | 3–3 | 3–2 | 1–0 | 1–2 | — | 1–2 |
| Vard Haugesund | 2–4 | 2–1 | 4–4 | 2–1 | 4–1 | 1–2 | 4–4 | 1–1 | 1–1 | 2–2 | 1–1 | 0–2 | 2–2 | — |

Source: (in Norwegian)
Legend: Blue = home team win; Yellow = draw; Red = away team win.

=== Season statistics ===
==== Top scorers ====
| Rank | Player | Club(s) | Goals |
|---|---|---|---|
| 1 | (Norway) Ole Sebastian Sundgot | Sandnes Ulf | 24 |
| 2 | (Norway) Lars Kilen | Sotra | 16 |
| 3 | (Norway) Andreas Østerud | Arendal | 12 |
| 4 | (Norway) Andreas Tveiten | Brattvåg | 11 |
| 5 | (Norway) Martin Ramsland | Arendal | 10 |
| 6 | (Norway) Jon Berisha | Brann 2 | 9 |
| 6 | (Norway) Josias King Furaha | Jerv | 9 |
| 8 | 5 players | | 8 |

==== Discipline ====
===== Player =====
- Most yellow cards: 8
  - (Norway) Noah Alexander Størk Jacobsen (Notodden)
  - (Norway) Sindre Lie (Sandviken)
  - (Norway) Simen Nygaard (Arendal)
- Most red cards: 2
  - (Norway) Tobias Bjørnebye (Vard Haugesund)
  - (Norway) Thorvald Sverdrup Trætteberg (Sandviken)

===== Club =====
- Most yellow cards: 61
  - Sandviken
- Fewest yellow cards: 37
  - Brann 2
- Most red cards: 5
  - Lysekloster
- Fewest red cards: 0
  - Brattvåg
  - Træff

== Group 2 ==
=== Teams ===
Locations of the teams in Group 2 of the 2025 Norwegian Second Division

The following 14 clubs competed in Group 2:

| Club | Municipality | Stadium | Capacity |
|---|---|---|---|
| Alta | Alta | SmartDok Arena | 1,200 |
| Asker | Asker | Føyka Stadion | 2,400 |
| Eidsvold Turn | Eidsvoll | Myhrer Stadion | 1,500 |
| Follo | Nordre Follo | Ski Stadion | 2,100 |
| Grorud | Oslo | Grorud Arctic Match | 1,700 |
| Hønefoss | Ringerike | Aka Arena | 4,120 |
| Kjelsås | Oslo | Grefsen Stadion | 2,000 |
| Levanger | Levanger | TOBB Arena Levanger | 2,200 |
| Rana | Mo i Rana | Sagbakken Stadion | 2,000 |
| Stjørdals-Blink | Stjørdal | M.U.S Stadion Sandskogan | 2,000 |
| Strindheim | Trondheim | Leangen Bolig Arena | 1,500 |
| Strømmen | Lillestrøm | Strømmen Stadion | 1,850 |
| Tromsdalen | Tromsø | TUIL Arena | 3,000 |
| Ull/Kisa | Ullensaker | Jessheim Stadion | 4,500 |

=== League table ===
| Pos | Team | Pld | W | D | L | GF | GA | GD | Pts | Promotion, qualification or relegation |
|---|---|---|---|---|---|---|---|---|---|---|
| 1 | Strømmen (C, P) | 26 | 20 | 2 | 4 | 69 | 24 | +45 | 62 | Promotion to First Division |
| 2 | Grorud | 26 | 17 | 3 | 6 | 58 | 36 | +22 | 54 | Qualification for promotion play-offs |
| 3 | Kjelsås | 26 | 15 | 3 | 8 | 57 | 41 | +16 | 48 | |
| 4 | Tromsdalen | 26 | 14 | 5 | 7 | 54 | 37 | +17 | 47 | |
| 5 | Ull/Kisa | 26 | 13 | 5 | 8 | 59 | 51 | +8 | 44 | |
| 6 | Eidsvold Turn | 26 | 13 | 5 | 8 | 50 | 51 | −1 | 44 | |
| 7 | Hønefoss | 26 | 13 | 3 | 10 | 57 | 48 | +9 | 42 | |
| 8 | Stjørdals-Blink | 26 | 11 | 2 | 13 | 45 | 45 | 0 | 35 | |
| 9 | Rana | 26 | 10 | 3 | 13 | 34 | 42 | −8 | 33 | |
| 10 | Levanger | 26 | 8 | 7 | 11 | 37 | 44 | −7 | 31 | |
| 11 | Follo | 26 | 8 | 2 | 16 | 33 | 50 | −17 | 26 | |
| 12 | Strindheim (R) | 26 | 7 | 1 | 18 | 36 | 65 | −29 | 22 | Relegation to Third Division |
| 13 | Alta (R) | 26 | 5 | 4 | 17 | 49 | 68 | −19 | 19 | Relegation to Third Division |
| 14 | Asker (R) | 26 | 3 | 5 | 18 | 32 | 68 | −36 | 14 | Relegation to Third Division |

Source: NIFS (in Norwegian)
Rules for classification: 1) Points; 2) Goal difference; 3) Goals scored; 4) Head-to-head points; 5) Head-to-head goal difference; 6) Head-to-head goals scored.
(C) Champions; (P) Promoted; (R) Relegated

=== Results ===
| Home \ Away | ALT | ASK | EID | FOL | GRO | HØN | KJE | LEV | RAN | STJ | STN | STM | TRO | ULL |
|---|---|---|---|---|---|---|---|---|---|---|---|---|---|---|
| Alta | — | 3–4 | 3–5 | 1–2 | 1–2 | 2–0 | 2–0 | 4–3 | 3–3 | 1–4 | 6–0 | 0–2 | 3–2 | 2–4 |
| Asker | 0–5 | — | 1–1 | 2–2 | 5–1 | 0–4 | 2–3 | 1–2 | 2–0 | 0–3 | 2–3 | 2–2 | 2–2 | 0–2 |
| Eidsvold Turn | 2–2 | 2–0 | — | 2–1 | 1–2 | 2–1 | 2–1 | 2–0 | 1–4 | 3–1 | 3–1 | 3–2 | 0–1 | 0–3 |
| Follo | 3–2 | 2–1 | 1–1 | — | 1–2 | 2–3 | 1–3 | 1–4 | 2–1 | 1–0 | 2–1 | 1–2 | 2–1 | 1–4 |
| Grorud | 4–3 | 5–0 | 4–0 | 3–2 | — | 5–1 | 0–2 | 5–1 | 3–0 | 5–3 | 2–1 | 0–2 | 0–3 | 2–2 |
| Hønefoss | 3–1 | 3–1 | 2–2 | 3–1 | 1–1 | — | 1–0 | 2–0 | 4–2 | 4–1 | 8–1 | 2–2 | 2–3 | 0–1 |
| Kjelsås | 6–4 | 2–1 | 4–5 | 3–1 | 0–2 | 5–4 | — | 1–0 | 2–2 | 1–2 | 6–2 | 1–2 | 2–0 | 3–1 |
| Levanger | 0–0 | 2–0 | 1–1 | 0–1 | 2–2 | 4–0 | 1–1 | — | 0–2 | 4–2 | 1–3 | 1–2 | 1–3 | 1–1 |
| Rana | 2–0 | 2–1 | 1–2 | 1–0 | 0–1 | 1–0 | 0–3 | 1–0 | — | 1–0 | 2–1 | 2–1 | 0–1 | 1–1 |
| Stjørdals-Blink | 3–0 | 4–1 | 2–1 | 2–0 | 1–0 | 0–3 | 1–2 | 1–3 | 2–1 | — | 4–2 | 0–1 | 1–1 | 2–3 |
| Strindheim | 2–2 | 4–1 | 2–3 | 2–0 | 0–2 | 0–1 | 1–2 | 1–2 | 2–0 | 1–0 | — | 2–4 | 2–1 | 0–1 |
| Strømmen | 6–0 | 5–0 | 5–1 | 2–1 | 2–1 | 3–0 | 1–0 | 7–0 | 4–1 | 0–2 | 4–1 | — | 1–0 | 1–2 |
| Tromsdalen | 3–2 | 1–1 | 4–2 | 2–1 | 1–2 | 5–1 | 2–2 | 1–1 | 3–2 | 3–1 | 2–0 | 0–1 | — | 3–2 |
| Ull/Kisa | 3–1 | 3–2 | 2–3 | 2–1 | 1–2 | 3–4 | 1–2 | 3–3 | 3–2 | 3–3 | 4–1 | 1–5 | 3–6 | — |

Source: (in Norwegian)
Legend: Blue = home team win; Yellow = draw; Red = away team win.

=== Season statistics ===
==== Top scorers ====
| Rank | Player | Club(s) | Goals |
|---|---|---|---|
| 1 | (Norway) Nikolay Jakobsen Hristov | Strømmen | 20 |
| 1 | (Norway) Jakob Rømo Skille | Ull/Kisa | 20 |
| 3 | (Norway) Mathias Sundberg | Strømmen | 15 |
| 4 | (Norway) Peder Brekke | Alta | 14 |
| 5 | (Norway) Andreas Solstrand Fossli | Stjørdals-Blink | 13 |
| 5 | (Norway) Ole Erik Midtskogen | Kjelsås | 13 |
| 7 | (Norway) Robin Johansen Hermanstad | Stjørdals-Blink | 12 |
| 7 | (Norway) Christian Reginiussen | Alta | 12 |
| 7 | (Norway) Emil Øverby | Hønefoss | 12 |
| 10 | (Norway) Henrik Elvevold | Hønefoss | 11 |
| 10 | (Norway) Magnus Tomren Solheim | Stjørdals-Blink | 11 |

==== Discipline ====
===== Player =====
- Most yellow cards: 8
  - (Norway) Matias Spiten-Nysæter (Asker)
- Most red cards: 1
  - 22 players

===== Club =====
- Most yellow cards: 56
  - Follo
- Fewest yellow cards: 23
  - Kjelsås
- Most red cards: 3
  - Grorud
  - Tromsdalen
- Fewest red cards: 0
  - Alta
  - Levanger
  - Strømmen

== Promotion play-offs ==
The teams who finished in second place in their respective group qualified for the promotion play-offs, where they faced each other over two legs. The winner went on to play against the 14th-placed team in the First Division for a place in the First Division next season.

2 November 2025
13:00 CET

| Brattvåg | 2–1 | Grorud |
|---|---|---|
| Solnørdal 9' (pen.); Dahle 45' | Report | Hammershaug 60' |

Brattvåg Stadion, Brattvåg
Referee: Johan William Grundt
9 November 2025
13:00 CET

| Grorud | 0–2 | Brattvåg |
|---|---|---|
| | Report | Stølan 23'; Vinje 51' |

Grorud Arctic Match, Oslo
Attendance: 1,145
Referee: Anders Bodding

Brattvåg won 4–1 on aggregate.

== See also ==
- 2025 Eliteserien
- 2025 Norwegian First Division
- 2025 Norwegian Third Division
- 2025 Norwegian Football Cup
- 2025–26 Norwegian Football Cup
