= 2023 Norwegian Second Division =

Norwegian football season

Norwegian Second Division
- Season: 2023
- Dates: 10 April – 11 November
- Champions: Egersund (Group 1); Levanger (Group 2)
- Promoted: Egersund; Lyn; Levanger
- Relegated: Træff; Fram Larvik; Aalesund 2 Bærum; Strømsgodset 2 Ullern
- Matches played: 364
- Goals scored: 1,212 (3.33 per match)

The 2023 Norwegian Second Division (referred to as PostNord-ligaen for sponsorship reasons) was a Norwegian football third-tier league season. The league consists of 28 teams divided into two groups of 14 teams.

The league was played as a double round-robin tournament, where all teams played 26 matches. The season started on 10 April 2023 and ended on 11 November 2023, not including play-off matches.

== Team changes ==
Last season, Moss and Hødd were promoted to the 2023 Norwegian First Division, while Odd 2, Staal Jørpeland, Eidsvold Turn, Asker and Frigg were relegated to the 2023 Norwegian Third Division.

Grorud and Stjørdals-Blink were relegated from the 2022 Norwegian First Division, while Lyn, Aalesund 2, Brann 2, Fram Larvik, Junkeren and Strømsgodset 2 were promoted from the 2022 Norwegian Third Division.

== Group 1 ==
=== Teams ===
Locations of the 2023 Norwegian Second Division group 1 teams.

The following 14 clubs compete in group 1:

Club	Municipality	Stadium	Capacity
Aalesund 2	Ålesund	Color Line Stadion	10,778
Arendal	Arendal	Norac Stadion	5,000
Brattvåg	Ålesund	Brattvåg Stadion	1,500
Egersund	Egersund	Idrettsparken	2,000
Fløy	Kristiansand	Flekkerøy Kunstgress	2,000
Fram Larvik	Larvik	Framparken	2,500
Grorud	Oslo	Grorud Arctic Match	1,700
Kjelsås	Oslo	Grefsen Stadion	2,000
Lyn	Oslo	Bislett Stadion	15,400
Notodden	Notodden	Idrettsparken	4,000
Træff	Molde	Reknesbanen	1,500
Vard Haugesund	Haugesund	Haugesund Stadion	8,754
Vålerenga 2	Oslo	Intility Arena	16,555
Ørn Horten	Horten	Lystlunden Stadion	3,000

=== League table ===
Pos	Team	Pld	W	D	L	GF	GA	GD	Pts	Promotion, qualification or relegation
1	Egersund (C, P)	26	19	5	2	73	21	+52	62	Promotion to First Division
2	Lyn (O, P)	26	20	2	4	74	23	+51	62	Qualification for promotion play-offs
3	Arendal	26	13	5	8	55	38	+17	44	
4	Grorud	26	9	9	8	31	27	+4	36	
5	Notodden	26	11	6	9	41	38	+3	36 (Note: Notodden have been deducted 3 points due to financial difficulties.)	
6	Kjelsås	26	9	8	9	25	28	−3	35	
7	Ørn Horten	26	9	6	11	41	40	+1	33	
8	Brattvåg	26	9	6	11	39	41	−2	33	
9	Fløy	26	9	5	12	33	35	−2	32	
10	Vålerenga 2	26	10	1	15	33	68	−35	31	
11	Vard Haugesund	26	7	6	13	33	47	−14	27	
12	Træff (R)	26	7	5	14	31	64	−33	26	Relegation to Third Division
13	Fram Larvik (R)	26	6	7	13	37	57	−20	25	Relegation to Third Division
14	Aalesund 2 (R)	26	6	5	15	29	48	−19	23	Relegation to Third Division

Source: NIFS (in Norwegian)
Rules for classification: 1) Points; 2) Goal difference; 3) Goals scored; 4) Head-to-head points; 5) Head-to-head goal difference; 6) Head-to-head goals scored.
(C) Champions; (O) Play-off winners; (P) Promoted; (R) Relegated

=== Results ===
Home \ Away	AAL	ARE	BRA	EGE	FLØ	FRA	GRO	KJE	LYN	NOT	TRÆ	VAR	VIF	ØRN
Aalesund 2	—	1–1	3–3	0–1	1–2	3–1	2–1	1–2	1–2	1–1	2–1	1–0	2–3	0–5
Arendal	3–1	—	0–3	1–1	3–0	2–0	2–1	1–1	2–1	0–3	4–0	2–0	11–0	3–0
Brattvåg	2–1	1–3	—	1–3	4–0	4–4	1–3	0–0	1–1	0–1	4–2	0–3	3–2	2–0
Egersund	5–1	3–3	5–0	—	0–0	4–1	2–2	5–2	2–1	1–1	2–0	5–0	5–0	6–0
Fløy	2–1	3–0	1–1	0–1	—	5–2	0–1	1–0	1–3	4–1	1–2	0–0	1–3	0–1
Fram Larvik	1–0	0–1	2–1	1–2	1–0	—	1–1	0–0	0–4	3–2	3–3	1–2	3–1	2–2
Grorud	0–0	3–1	2–1	0–1	1–3	1–0	—	0–1	2–1	0–0	0–1	4–0	4–1	0–4
Kjelsås	1–0	3–1	0–1	0–1	1–3	1–1	1–1	—	0–1	4–1	1–1	0–0	2–1	1–0
Lyn	4–0	4–3	1–0	2–1	3–1	10–1	0–1	2–0	—	4–0	7–0	2–1	4–0	2–1
Notodden	1–0	3–0	1–1	2–0	0–0	2–1	0–0	0–1	2–5	—	1–2	5–1	3–0	4–0
Træff	1–3	2–2	0–3	1–5	0–3	2–1	2–2	2–0	1–4	1–2	—	2–2	1–0	1–2
Vard Haugesund	3–1	3–0	0–1	1–3	1–1	2–1	1–1	1–2	1–4	3–4	3–0	—	1–2	2–2
Vålerenga 2	1–1	0–3	1–0	1–8	1–0	1–5	1–0	2–0	1–2	2–1	5–0	0–2	—	4–1
Ørn Horten	1–2	1–3	2–1	0–1	3–1	1–1	0–0	1–1	0–0	4–0	2–3	3–0	5–0	—

Source: Norwegian Football Federation
Legend: Blue = home team win; Yellow = draw; Red = away team win.

== Group 2 ==
=== Teams ===
Locations of the 2023 Norwegian Second Division group 2 teams.

The following 14 clubs compete in group 2:

Club	Municipality	Stadium	Capacity
Alta	Alta	Finnmarkshallen	1,200
Brann 2	Bergen	Varden Amfi	3,500
Bærum	Sandvika	Sandvika Stadion	1,500
Gjøvik-Lyn	Gjøvik	Gjøvik Stadion	3,000
Junkeren	Bodø	Nordlandshallen	5,500
Kvik Halden	Halden	Halden Stadion	4,200
Levanger	Levanger	TOBB Arena	2,200
Sotra	Straume	Straume Idrettspark	1,200
Stjørdals-Blink	Stjørdal	M.U.S Stadion Sandskogan	2,000
Strømmen	Lillestrøm	Strømmen Stadion	1,850
Strømsgodset 2	Drammen	Marienlyst Stadion	8,935
Tromsdalen	Tromsø	TUIL Arena	3,000
Ull/Kisa	Jessheim	Jessheim Stadion	4,500
Ullern	Oslo	CC Vest Arena	1,500

=== League table ===
Pos	Team	Pld	W	D	L	GF	GA	GD	Pts	Promotion, qualification or relegation
1	Levanger (C, P)	26	22	4	0	74	17	+57	70	Promotion to First Division
2	Tromsdalen	26	15	5	6	56	29	+27	50	Qualification for promotion play–offs
3	Sotra	26	12	9	5	43	30	+13	45	
4	Strømmen	26	14	3	9	39	35	+4	45	
5	Ull/Kisa	26	11	8	7	43	34	+9	41	
6	Alta	26	12	3	11	51	53	−2	39	
7	Stjørdals-Blink	26	10	8	8	54	42	+12	38	
8	Kvik Halden	26	9	4	13	43	51	−8	31	
9	Brann 2	26	7	7	12	52	65	−13	28	
10	Junkeren	26	6	9	11	40	54	−14	27	
11	Gjøvik-Lyn	26	7	9	10	37	50	−13	26 (Note: Gjøvik-Lyn have been deducted 4 points due to financial difficulties.)	
12	Bærum (R)	26	7	5	14	44	61	−17	26	Relegation to Third Division
13	Strømsgodset 2 (R)	26	5	5	16	35	57	−22	20	Relegation to Third Division
14	Ullern (R)	26	2	7	17	26	59	−33	13	Relegation to Third Division

Source: NIFS (in Norwegian)
Rules for classification: 1) Points; 2) Goal difference; 3) Goals scored; 4) Head–to–head points; 5) Head–to–head goal difference; 6) Head–to–head goals scored.
(C) Champions; (P) Promoted; (R) Relegated

=== Results ===
Home \ Away	ALT	BRA	BÆR	GJØ	JUN	KVH	LEV	SOT	STJ	STR	SIF	TRO	UKI	ULL
Alta	—	7–1	1–1	3–2	1–3	3–0	0–1	1–1	4–2	1–0	2–1	3–1	1–1	2–1
Brann 2	5–1	—	2–3	7–1	3–3	1–3	1–2	1–1	4–3	0–1	2–2	2–3	0–5	2–2
Bærum	4–3	1–0	—	1–1	3–3	3–3	2–6	1–2	0–3	0–1	4–0	0–2	1–3	6–1
Gjøvik-Lyn	3–2	3–3	4–2	—	0–0	2–1	0–1	4–1	0–0	1–1	2–0	0–3	1–3	3–2
Junkeren	0–1	1–3	3–1	1–1	—	3–3	1–4	0–2	0–2	3–1	1–3	1–2	0–0	2–1
Kvik Halden	1–2	4–2	3–0	2–2	3–3	—	0–4	3–1	1–3	3–1	3–2	3–2	0–1	4–1
Levanger	5–1	5–0	6–0	5–1	3–3	1–0	—	1–1	2–2	2–0	4–1	2–2	2–0	2–0
Sotra	2–1	1–1	2–1	1–0	2–1	2–0	0–1	—	2–2	2–0	3–0	3–1	2–1	1–1
Stjørdals-Blink	4–2	6–3	1–2	1–0	1–4	5–0	1–3	2–1	—	1–2	1–1	1–1	1–1	3–3
Strømmen	1–0	1–2	3–2	0–3	3–0	2–1	1–3	2–1	2–1	—	1–1	5–1	1–0	2–0
Strømsgodset 2	2–3	3–2	2–4	5–1	2–3	2–0	0–1	1–1	0–3	0–3	—	0–2	1–3	5–1
Tromsdalen	5–2	0–1	0–0	3–0	4–0	2–0	0–1	2–2	3–1	5–0	4–0	—	2–1	4–0
Ull/Kisa	5–1	2–2	4–1	1–1	1–1	1–0	0–5	2–2	0–3	1–4	2–0	1–1	—	3–1
Ullern	1–3	1–2	2–1	1–1	4–0	0–2	0–2	0–4	1–1	1–1	1–1	0–1	0–1	—

Source: Norwegian Football Federation
Legend: Blue = home team win; Yellow = draw; Red = away team win.

== Promotion play-offs ==
The teams who finish in second place in their respective group qualify for the promotion play-offs, where they face each other over two legs. The winner goes on to play against the 14th-placed team in the First Division for a place in the First Division next season.

15 November 2023
18:00 CET

Lyn	1–2	Tromsdalen
Breistøl 53'	Report	Hafstad 65'; Sandbukt 83'

Nadderud Stadion, Bærum
Attendance: 2,167
Referee: Ali al Hatam
19 November 2023
15:00 CET

Tromsdalen	0–2	Lyn
	Report	Olsen 1', 40'

TUIL Arena, Tromsø
Attendance: 1,275
Referee: Mathias Støfringshaug

Lyn won 3–2 on aggregate.
