= 2022 Norwegian Second Division =

Norwegian football season

Norwegian Second Division
- Season: 2022
- Dates: 9 April 2022 – 22 October 2022
- Champions: Moss (Group 1); Hødd (Group 2)
- Promoted: Moss; Hødd
- Relegated: Odd 2 Staal Jørpeland; Eidsvold Turn; Asker; Frigg
- Matches played: 338
- Goals scored: 1,145 (3.39 per match)
- Top goalscorer: Group 1: Jens Aslaksrud & Fabian Ness (15 goals); Group 2: Sondre Sørløkk (20 goals)
- Biggest home win: Ullern 8–0 Staal Jørpeland (13 August 2022)
- Biggest away win: Vålerenga 2 0–7 Hødd (29 August 2022)

The 2022 Norwegian Second Division (referred to as PostNord-ligaen for sponsorship reasons) was a Norwegian football third-tier league season. The league consisted of 28 teams divided into 2 groups of 14 teams.

The league was played as a double round-robin tournament, where all teams played 26 matches. The season started on 9 April 2022 and ended on 22 October 2022, not including play-off matches.

== Team changes ==
Last season, Kongsvinger and Skeid were promoted to the 2022 Norwegian First Division, while Florø, Fløya, Fram Larvik, Nardo, Rosenborg 2 and Senja were relegated to the 2022 Norwegian Third Division.

Strømmen and Ull/Kisa were relegated from the 2021 Norwegian First Division, while Frigg, Gjøvik-Lyn, Staal Jørpeland, Træff, Ullern and Ørn Horten were promoted from the 2021 Norwegian Third Division.

== Group 1 ==
=== Teams ===
Locations of the 2022 Norwegian Second Division group 1 teams.

The following 14 clubs compete in group 1:

| Club | Location | Stadium | Capacity |
|---|---|---|---|
| Arendal | Arendal | Norac Stadion | 5,000 |
| Egersund | Egersund | Idrettsparken | 2,000 |
| Fløy | Flekkerøy | Flekkerøy Kunstgress | 2,000 |
| Kvik Halden | Halden | Halden Stadion | 4,200 |
| Moss | Moss | Melløs Stadion | 4,000 |
| Notodden | Notodden | Idrettsparken | 4,000 |
| Odd 2 | Skien | Skagerak Arena | 11,767 |
| Sotra | Sotra | Straume Idrettspark | 1,200 |
| Staal Jørpeland | Jørpeland | Jørpeland Stadion | 1,200 |
| Strømmen | Strømmen | Strømmen Stadion | 1,850 |
| Ullern | Oslo | CC Vest Arena | 1,500 |
| Vard Haugesund | Haugesund | Haugesund Stadion | 8,754 |
| Ørn Horten | Horten | Lystlunden Stadion | 3,000 |
| Øygarden | Ågotnes | Ågotnes Stadion | 1,200 |

=== League table ===
| Pos | Team | Pld | W | D | L | GF | GA | GD | Pts | Promotion, qualification or relegation |
|---|---|---|---|---|---|---|---|---|---|---|
| 1 | Moss (C, P) | 24 | 18 | 2 | 4 | 46 | 23 | +23 | 56 | Promotion to First Division |
| 2 | Arendal | 24 | 18 | 2 | 4 | 55 | 35 | +20 | 56 | Qualification for promotion play-offs |
| 3 | Egersund | 24 | 13 | 6 | 5 | 51 | 29 | +22 | 45 | |
| 4 | Fløy | 24 | 13 | 4 | 7 | 46 | 32 | +14 | 43 | |
| 5 | Kvik Halden | 24 | 10 | 4 | 10 | 43 | 36 | +7 | 34 | |
| 6 | Strømmen | 24 | 9 | 4 | 11 | 36 | 39 | −3 | 31 | |
| 7 | Sotra | 24 | 8 | 5 | 11 | 46 | 43 | +3 | 29 | |
| 8 | Ørn Horten | 24 | 7 | 8 | 9 | 37 | 38 | −1 | 29 | |
| 9 | Ullern | 24 | 5 | 9 | 10 | 37 | 43 | −6 | 24 | |
| 10 | Vard Haugesund | 24 | 5 | 8 | 11 | 32 | 43 | −11 | 23 | |
| 11 | Notodden | 24 | 6 | 6 | 12 | 29 | 45 | −16 | 23 (Note: Notodden have been deducted 1 point due to financial difficulties.) | |
| 12 | Odd 2 (R) | 24 | 5 | 7 | 12 | 30 | 48 | −18 | 22 | Relegation to Third Division |
| 13 | Staal Jørpeland (R) | 24 | 3 | 7 | 14 | 34 | 68 | −34 | 16 | Relegation to Third Division |
| 14 | Øygarden (Note: Øygarden went bankrupt and withdrew their team on 2 June 2022. All their matches were annulled.) | 0 | 0 | 0 | 0 | 0 | 0 | 0 | 0 | Withdrew |

Source: NIFS (in Norwegian)
Rules for classification: 1) Points; 2) Goal difference; 3) Goals scored; 4) Head-to-head points; 5) Head-to-head goal difference; 6) Head-to-head goals scored.
(C) Champions; (P) Promoted; (R) Relegated

=== Results ===
| Home \ Away | ARE | EGE | FLØ | KVI | MOS | NOT | ODD | SOT | STA | STR | ULL | VAR | ØRN |
|---|---|---|---|---|---|---|---|---|---|---|---|---|---|
| Arendal | — | 1–0 | 1–0 | 5–4 | 4–0 | 2–0 | 2–0 | 3–1 | 2–2 | 2–0 | 1–0 | 3–1 | 3–2 |
| Egersund | 2–2 | — | 3–2 | 0–2 | 2–2 | 2–0 | 4–0 | 3–2 | 4–0 | 1–2 | 5–2 | 1–1 | 0–0 |
| Fløy | 3–1 | 1–1 | — | 2–1 | 0–2 | 1–0 | 2–0 | 3–2 | 2–2 | 2–3 | 5–1 | 3–2 | 2–0 |
| Kvik Halden | 1–3 | 1–4 | 3–1 | — | 1–0 | 3–0 | 1–2 | 2–0 | 1–1 | 1–2 | 2–0 | 2–0 | 1–1 |
| Moss | 0–1 | 2–0 | 3–0 | 1–0 | — | 3–1 | 1–1 | 2–0 | 1–0 | 2–1 | 2–1 | 3–2 | 1–0 |
| Notodden | 2–0 | 3–2 | 0–4 | 2–1 | 1–3 | — | 4–0 | 2–2 | 1–3 | 2–0 | 1–1 | 0–0 | 2–0 |
| Odd 2 | 1–5 | 0–3 | 2–2 | 0–1 | 1–3 | 5–2 | — | 1–1 | 3–2 | 5–1 | 0–0 | 1–1 | 2–2 |
| Sotra | 1–2 | 1–2 | 2–0 | 0–3 | 0–1 | 2–2 | 2–3 | — | 4–1 | 2–0 | 1–1 | 5–2 | 4–2 |
| Staal Jørpeland | 2–6 | 1–4 | 1–2 | 0–4 | 1–4 | 3–3 | 1–0 | 2–6 | — | 2–2 | 1–1 | 6–2 | 0–1 |
| Strømmen | 5–0 | 1–3 | 0–2 | 2–2 | 1–3 | 4–0 | 2–0 | 2–0 | 4–2 | — | 2–0 | 0–1 | 1–1 |
| Ullern | 0–3 | 1–2 | 1–1 | 5–3 | 1–3 | 2–0 | 2–0 | 2–2 | 8–0 | 1–1 | — | 0–0 | 2–1 |
| Vard Haugesund | 0–2 | 1–2 | 0–1 | 2–2 | 1–3 | 1–1 | 2–2 | 0–2 | 3–1 | 3–0 | 4–2 | — | 2–0 |
| Ørn Horten | 8–1 | 1–1 | 1–5 | 3–1 | 3–1 | 1–0 | 2–1 | 2–4 | 0–0 | 2–0 | 3–3 | 1–1 | — |

Source: Norwegian Football Federation
Legend: Blue = home team win; Yellow = draw; Red = away team win.

=== Top scorers ===
| Rank | Player | Club | Goals |
|---|---|---|---|
| 1 | (Norway) Jens Aslaksrud | Ullern | 15 |
| 1 | (Norway) Fabian Ness | Kvik Halden | 15 |
| 3 | (Norway) Adrian Rogulj | Ørn Horten | 13 |
| 4 | (Norway) Kristian Lien | Fløy | 12 |
| 5 | (Norway) Adrian Bergersen | Egersund | 11 |
| 5 | (Portugal) Cláudio Braga | Moss | 11 |
| 5 | (Norway) Mathias Johansen | Arendal | 11 |
| 5 | (Norway) Lars Groos Kilen | Sotra | 11 |
| 5 | (Norway) Abel Stensrud | Odd 2 | 11 |
| 10 | (Norway) Simen Hammershaug | Egersund | 10 |

== Group 2 ==
=== Teams ===
Locations of the 2022 Norwegian Second Division group 2 teams.

The following 14 clubs compete in group 2:

| Club | Location | Stadium | Capacity |
|---|---|---|---|
| Alta | Alta | Finnmarkshallen | 1,200 |
| Asker | Asker | Føyka Stadion | 2,400 |
| Brattvåg | Brattvåg | Brattvåg Stadion | 1,500 |
| Bærum | Sandvika | Sandvika Stadion | 1,500 |
| Eidsvold Turn | Eidsvoll | Myhrer Stadion | 1,500 |
| Frigg | Oslo | Tørteberg | 1,200 |
| Gjøvik-Lyn | Gjøvik | Gjøvik Stadion | 3,000 |
| Hødd | Ulsteinvik | Nye Høddvoll | 4,081 |
| Kjelsås | Oslo | Grefsen Stadion | 2,000 |
| Levanger | Levanger | TOBB Arena | 2,200 |
| Tromsdalen | Tromsø | TUIL Arena | 3,000 |
| Træff | Molde | Reknesbanen | 1,500 |
| Ull/Kisa | Jessheim | Jessheim Stadion | 4,500 |
| Vålerenga 2 | Oslo | Intility Arena | 16,555 |

=== League table ===
| Pos | Team | Pld | W | D | L | GF | GA | GD | Pts | Promotion, qualification or relegation |
|---|---|---|---|---|---|---|---|---|---|---|
| 1 | Hødd (C, P) | 26 | 18 | 6 | 2 | 54 | 15 | +39 | 60 | Promotion to First Division |
| 2 | Ull/Kisa | 26 | 17 | 5 | 4 | 73 | 36 | +37 | 56 | Qualification for promotion play-offs |
| 3 | Levanger | 26 | 12 | 7 | 7 | 62 | 38 | +24 | 43 | |
| 4 | Kjelsås | 26 | 12 | 6 | 8 | 45 | 20 | +25 | 42 | |
| 5 | Gjøvik-Lyn | 26 | 12 | 4 | 10 | 43 | 59 | −16 | 40 | |
| 6 | Træff | 26 | 10 | 6 | 10 | 49 | 44 | +5 | 36 | |
| 7 | Alta | 26 | 10 | 6 | 10 | 38 | 45 | −7 | 36 | |
| 8 | Tromsdalen | 26 | 10 | 5 | 11 | 28 | 35 | −7 | 35 | |
| 9 | Brattvåg | 26 | 10 | 3 | 13 | 47 | 52 | −5 | 33 | |
| 10 | Bærum | 26 | 9 | 4 | 13 | 36 | 46 | −10 | 31 | |
| 11 | Vålerenga 2 | 26 | 9 | 2 | 15 | 43 | 67 | −24 | 29 | |
| 12 | Eidsvold Turn (R) | 26 | 8 | 4 | 14 | 35 | 54 | −19 | 28 | Relegation to Third Division |
| 13 | Asker (R) | 26 | 6 | 6 | 14 | 32 | 47 | −15 | 24 | Relegation to Third Division |
| 14 | Frigg (R) | 26 | 6 | 2 | 18 | 38 | 65 | −27 | 20 | Relegation to Third Division |

Source: NIFS (in Norwegian)
Rules for classification: 1) Points; 2) Goal difference; 3) Goals scored; 4) Head-to-head points; 5) Head-to-head goal difference; 6) Head-to-head goals scored.
(C) Champions; (P) Promoted; (R) Relegated

=== Results ===
| Home \ Away | ALT | ASK | BRA | BÆR | EID | FRI | GJØ | HØD | KJE | LEV | TRO | TRÆ | ULL | VÅL |
|---|---|---|---|---|---|---|---|---|---|---|---|---|---|---|
| Alta | — | 2–1 | 3–1 | 0–2 | 2–1 | 3–0 | 5–0 | 1–1 | 1–1 | 2–1 | 2–0 | 3–3 | 0–3 | 1–2 |
| Asker | 0–1 | — | 3–2 | 0–2 | 2–1 | 3–0 | 2–3 | 1–1 | 1–1 | 3–2 | 0–1 | 2–2 | 0–0 | 1–4 |
| Brattvåg | 1–1 | 3–1 | — | 3–0 | 0–2 | 2–0 | 3–1 | 1–2 | 2–1 | 1–1 | 1–1 | 2–5 | 4–2 | 3–0 |
| Bærum | 2–1 | 2–3 | 4–1 | — | 0–2 | 3–0 | 1–2 | 0–1 | 1–3 | 2–2 | 1–0 | 2–1 | 0–4 | 4–0 |
| Eidsvold Turn | 1–3 | 1–1 | 3–1 | 1–3 | — | 1–3 | 3–1 | 1–5 | 2–1 | 2–1 | 4–0 | 1–1 | 1–2 | 2–0 |
| Frigg | 2–2 | 0–2 | 3–0 | 4–1 | 3–0 | — | 0–1 | 0–3 | 1–2 | 1–4 | 0–3 | 1–3 | 1–3 | 4–0 |
| Gjøvik-Lyn | 2–0 | 1–0 | 3–6 | 1–1 | 2–2 | 2–7 | — | 1–1 | 1–0 | 1–6 | 1–0 | 4–2 | 4–0 | 3–0 |
| Hødd | 2–0 | 1–0 | 3–0 | 0–0 | 2–1 | 6–1 | 4–0 | — | 1–0 | 2–1 | 2–1 | 1–1 | 1–1 | 3–0 |
| Kjelsås | 0–1 | 5–0 | 2–0 | 1–1 | 6–0 | 1–0 | 4–0 | 0–1 | — | 1–1 | 6–0 | 0–2 | 2–2 | 2–0 |
| Levanger | 5–0 | 2–0 | 5–3 | 4–2 | 1–1 | 4–4 | 0–3 | 2–0 | 1–0 | — | 2–2 | 2–3 | 4–0 | 1–1 |
| Tromsdalen | 1–1 | 2–0 | 1–0 | 3–0 | 1–0 | 2–0 | 0–2 | 0–2 | 0–1 | 0–3 | — | 1–0 | 3–1 | 0–0 |
| Træff | 2–0 | 2–2 | 1–3 | 1–0 | 3–0 | 2–1 | 1–1 | 1–2 | 0–1 | 1–3 | 1–3 | — | 0–4 | 6–2 |
| Ull/Kisa | 4–1 | 4–3 | 3–2 | 4–2 | 5–0 | 8–1 | 6–2 | 1–0 | 1–1 | 2–1 | 2–2 | 2–0 | — | 3–0 |
| Vålerenga 2 | 7–2 | 2–1 | 1–2 | 4–0 | 5–2 | 4–1 | 5–1 | 0–7 | 0–3 | 1–3 | 3–1 | 1–5 | 1–6 | — |

Source: Norwegian Football Federation
Legend: Blue = home team win; Yellow = draw; Red = away team win.

=== Top scorers ===
| Rank | Player | Club | Goals |
|---|---|---|---|
| 1 | (Norway) Sondre Sørløkk | Ull/Kisa | 20 |
| 2 | (Norway) Ole Erik Midtskogen | Kjelsås | 18 |
| 3 | (Norway) Robin Hjelmeseth | Hødd | 17 |
| 4 | (Norway) Jacob Jacobsen Bolsø | Træff | 15 |
| 4 | (Norway) Sindre Mauritz-Hansen | Asker | 15 |
| 6 | (Norway) Ole Sebastian Sundgot | Ull/Kisa | 14 |
| 7 | (Norway) Preben Asp | Levanger | 13 |
| 8 | (Norway) Ulrik Ferrer | Frigg | 12 |
| 9 | (Norway) Andreas Gundersen | Levanger | 11 |
| 9 | (Denmark) Sami Kamel | Brattvåg | 11 |
| 9 | (Norway) Christian Reginiussen | Alta | 11 |

== Promotion play-offs ==
The teams who finish in second place in their respective group qualify for the promotion play-offs, where they face each other over two legs. The winner goes on to play against the 14th-placed team in the First Division for a place in the First Division next season.

26 October 2022
18:00 CEST

| Arendal | 0–1 | Ull/Kisa |
|---|---|---|
| | Report | Byttingsvik 29' (o.g.) |

Norac Stadion, Arendal
Attendance: 812
Referee: Daniel Higraff
29 October 2022
15:00 CEST

| Ull/Kisa | 0–3 | Arendal |
|---|---|---|
| | Report | Jenssen 4' (o.g.); Christensen 56'; Bergan 64' |

Jessheim Stadion, Jessheim
Attendance: 942
Referee: Harald Vollstad Sletner

Arendal won 3–1 on aggregate.
