= 2026 Norwegian First Division =

Association football season in Norway

Norwegian First Division
- Season: 2026
- Dates: 5 April – 8 November
- Champions: Strømsgodset
- Promoted: Strømsgodset; Haugesund
- Relegated: Åsane; Raufoss
- Matches: 168
- Goals: 644 (3.83 per match)
- Top goalscorer: Sory Ibrahim Diarra (31 goals)
- Biggest home win: Kongsvinger 9–1 Raufoss (5 September 2026)
- Biggest away win: Strømmen 0–7 Haugesund (20 May 2026)
- Highest scoring: Kongsvinger 9–1 Raufoss (5 September 2026)
- Longest winning run: 7 matches Stabæk
- Longest unbeaten run: 11 matches Strømsgodset
- Longest winless run: 9 matches Moss; Strømmen
- Longest losing run: 6 matches Raufoss; Strømmen; Åsane
- Highest attendance: 6,464; Odd 1–1 Strømsgodset (5 September 2026)
- Lowest attendance: 228; Strømmen 2–0 Bryne (5 September 2026)
- All statistics correct as of 7 September 2026.

The 2026 Norwegian First Division (referred to as OBOS-ligaen for sponsorship reasons) is the Norwegian second-tier men's professional football league season. The season started on 6 April and ended on 8 November, not including play-off matches.

== Teams ==
Locations of teams in the 2026 Norwegian First Division

The following teams have changed division since the 2025 season:

=== To First Division ===
Promoted from Second Division

- Sandnes Ulf
- Strømmen

Relegated from Eliteserien

- Bryne
- Strømsgodset
- Haugesund

=== From First Division ===
Promoted to Eliteserien

- Lillestrøm
- Start
- Aalesund

Relegated to Second Division

- Mjøndalen
- Skeid

=== Stadiums and locations ===
Team	Location	County	Arena	Turf	Capacity
Bryne	Bryne	Rogaland	Bryne Stadion	Natural	5,000
Egersund	Egersund	Rogaland	XL-BYGG Sørvest Arena	Artificial	1,200
Haugesund	Haugesund	Rogaland	Haugesund Sparebank Arena	Natural	8,983
Hødd	Ulsteinvik	Møre og Romsdal	Høddvoll	Artificial	4,081
Kongsvinger	Kongsvinger	Innlandet	Gjemselund	Artificial	5,824
Lyn	Oslo	Oslo	Bislett	Natural	15,400
Moss	Moss	Østfold	Melløs	Natural	2,373
Odd	Skien	Telemark	Skagerak Arena	Artificial	11,767
Ranheim	Trondheim	Trøndelag	EXTRA Arena	Artificial	3,000
Raufoss	Raufoss	Innlandet	NAMMO Stadion	Artificial	1,800
Sandnes Ulf	Sandnes	Rogaland	Øster Hus Arena	Artificial	6,043
Sogndal	Sogndalsfjøra	Vestland	Fosshaugane Campus	Artificial	5,622
Stabæk	Bærum	Akershus	Nadderud	Artificial	4,542
Strømmen	Lillestrøm	Akershus	Strømmen Stadion	Artificial	2,000
Strømsgodset	Drammen	Buskerud	Marienlyst Stadion	Artificial	8,935
Åsane	Bergen	Vestland	Åsane Arena	Artificial	3,300

=== Personnel and kits ===
Team	Manager	Captain	Kit manufacturer	Shirt sponsor
Bryne	(Norway) Ørjan Heiberg	(Denmark) Jacob Haahr	Umbro	Sparebanken Norge
Egersund	(Norway) Marius Kjørvik Johansen	(Norway) Chris Sleveland	Macron	Sparebanken Norge
Haugesund	(Norway) Endre Eide	(Mali) Sory Ibrahim Diarra	Umbro	Haugaland Kraft
Hødd	(Denmark) Ivan Poulsen	(Norway) Torbjørn Kallevåg	Puma	Sparebanken Møre
Kongsvinger	(Sweden) Johan Wennberg	(Norway) Andreas Dybevik	Umbro	Mapei
Lyn	(Norway) Magnus Aadland	(Norway) William Sell	Hummel	OBOS
Moss	(Norway) Geir Bakke	(Norway) Kristian Strande	Select	SpareBank 1 Østfold Akershus
Odd	(Denmark) Per Frandsen	(Denmark) Hans Christian Bonnesen	Hummel	Skagerak Energi
Ranheim	(Norway) Christian Eggen Rismark	(Norway) Philip Slørdahl	Umbro	SpareBank 1 SMN
Raufoss	(Norway) Ole Petter Berget	(Norway) Eirik Åsvestad	Puma	Nammo
Sandnes Ulf	(Norway) Arturo Cleveland	(Faroe Islands) Gullbrandur Øregaard	Hummel	Øster Hus
Sogndal	(Norway) Eirik Bakke (interim)	(Norway) Even Hovland	Umbro	Sparebanken Norge
Stabæk	(Norway) Kjell André Thu	(Norway) Nicolai Næss	Craft	None
Strømmen	(Norway) Marcus Ericson (Norway) Svein Roger Pettersen	(Norway) Thomas Lillo	Puma	Strømmen Sparebank
Strømsgodset	(Norway) Magne Hoset	(Norway) Gustav Valsvik	Adidas	Sparebanken Øst
Åsane	(Norway) Thomas Lyngbø	(Norway) Kristoffer Barmen	Craft	Tertnes Holding

=== Managerial changes ===
Team	Outgoing manager	Manner of departure	Date of vacancy	Position in the table	Incoming manager	Date of appointment
Bryne	(Norway) Kevin Knappen	Mutual consent	17 December 2025	Pre-season	(Norway) Ørjan Heiberg	22 December 2025
Strømmen	(Norway) Ørjan Heiberg	Signed by Bryne	22 December 2025	Pre-season	(Sweden) Jens Wedeborg	22 December 2025
Hødd	(Norway) Marius Bøe	Contract expired	31 December 2025	Pre-season	(Denmark) Ivan Poulsen	1 January 2026
Raufoss	(Sweden) Jörgen Wålemark	Contract expired	31 December 2025	Pre-season	(Australia) Kasey Wehrman	1 January 2026
Stabæk	(Sweden) Mikael Stahre	Contract expired	31 December 2025	Pre-season	(Norway) Kjell André Thu	1 January 2026
Strømsgodset	(Norway) Dag-Eilev Fagermo	Mutual agreement	19 January 2026	Pre-season	(Norway) Magne Hoseth	6 February 2026
Åsane	(Norway) Eirik Bakke	Mutual agreement	6 February 2026	Pre-season	(Norway) Thomas Lyngbø	17 February 2026
Haugesund	(Finland) Toni Korkeakunnas	Sacked	9 March 2026	Pre-season	(Norway) Øyvind Hompland (Norway) Dennis Horneland (caretakers)	9 March 2026
Egersund	(Norway) Endre Eide	Signed by Haugesund	20 April 2026	5th	(Norway) Marius Kjørvik Johansen	20 April 2026
Haugesund	(Norway) Øyvind Hompland (Norway) Dennis Horneland (caretakers)	End of caretaker spell	22 April 2026	1st	(Norway) Endre Eide	22 April 2026
Raufoss	(Australia) Kasey Wehrman	Sacked	11 May 2026	15th	(Norway) Ole Petter Berget	27 May 2026
Strømmen	(Sweden) Jens Wedeborg	Sacked	28 May 2026	16th	(Norway) Marcus Ericson (Norway) Svein Roger Pettersen	13 June 2026

== League table ==
Pos	Team	Pld	W	D	L	GF	GA	GD	Pts	Promotion, qualification or relegation
1	Strømsgodset (C, P)	30	20	6	4	82	36	+46	66	Promotion to Eliteserien
2	Haugesund (P)	30	21	2	7	86	51	+35	65	Promotion to Eliteserien
3	Kongsvinger	30	18	5	7	84	50	+34	59	Qualification for the promotion play-offs third round
4	Stabæk	30	18	4	8	70	38	+32	58	Qualification for the promotion play-offs second round
5	Odd	30	14	7	9	60	48	+12	49	Qualification for the promotion play-offs first round
6	Bryne	30	14	4	12	46	42	+4	46	Qualification for the promotion play-offs first round
7	Ranheim	30	12	5	13	74	72	+2	41	
8	Egersund	30	11	8	11	50	57	−7	41	
9	Strømmen	30	11	6	13	52	62	−10	39	
10	Hødd	30	11	6	13	49	59	−10	39	
11	Lyn	30	10	4	16	46	61	−15	34	
12	Sandnes Ulf	30	9	6	15	45	59	−14	33	
13	Moss	30	9	5	16	44	63	−19	32	
14	Sogndal	30	8	7	15	48	63	−15	31	Qualification for the relegation play-offs
15	Åsane (R)	30	7	5	18	42	68	−26	25 (Note: Åsane deducted 1 point due to late submission of financial reporting package.)	Relegation to Second Division
16	Raufoss (R)	30	6	2	22	31	80	−49	20	Relegation to Second Division

Updated to match(es) played on 8 November 2026. Source: OBOS-ligaen (in Norwegian)
Rules for classification: 1) Points; 2) Goal difference; 3) Goals scored; 4) Head-to-head points; 5) Head-to-head goal difference; 6) Head-to-head goals scored.
(C) Champions; (P) Promoted; (R) Relegated

== Results ==
Home \ Away	BRY	EGE	HAU	HØD	KON	LYN	MOS	ODD	RAN	RAU	SAN	SOG	STB	STR	SGO	ÅSA
Bryne	—		0–2	1–0		1–0	2–1	1–2	2–3	1–1	1–1	3–3	2–0	4–2	0–2	1–0
Egersund	1–0	—	5–2			0–0	3–0	0–1	3–0	2–1	2–0		0–4		0–5	2–2
Haugesund	1–2	3–0	—		4–2		3–1		4–1	7–2	2–0	2–0			4–2	1–1
Hødd		3–1	0–2	—	1–2		2–1				2–1	2–2	2–1	4–3	4–3	1–0
Kongsvinger	3–0	2–1	3–2		—	4–4	2–1	4–2		9–1		5–1		1–3	4–4	3–1
Lyn	0–3	1–1	2–4	1–4	0–3	—		5–1			0–2	3–2	0–4	1–0		6–2
Moss	2–3			1–0		2–1	—	3–3		1–2	1–4	2–2	2–2	1–2	1–1	
Odd			1–3	0–0	0–1	3–0	2–3	—	3–1	1–0		4–0	2–2		1–1	4–1
Ranheim			3–4	3–2	1–1	3–2	4–0	3–5	—	5–1	5–1		2–5	2–2	1–3	
Raufoss	3–0		3–4	1–1	1–3	0–1				—	0–3	3–1	0–2	1–0		1–2
Sandnes Ulf	0–1	4–2		3–4	1–6			1–3	1–1	3–0	—	2–0	0–1	2–0	1–1	
Sogndal	0–2	4–2	5–1			0–3	2–4		3–2		2–0	—	2–2	2–3		2–0
Stabæk	2–0	3–1	3–2	6–0	2–0	4–3	2–3		4–2	1–2			—			4–0
Strømmen	2–0	0–3	0–7	1–2	2–2		3–2	0–0	1–4	3–1		2–3	1–0	—		
Strømsgodset	1–0	0–2		3–1		1–1		2–2	5–4	6–1		3–0	2–1	3–0	—	
Åsane		3–3		2–2	1–2	1–2	2–3	2–1	3–0	3–0	2–0			4–5	0–3	—

Updated to match(es) played on 6 September 2026. Source: Norwegian Football Federation (in Norwegian)
Legend: Blue = home team win; Yellow = draw; Red = away team win.

== Positions by round ==
Team ╲ Round	1	2	3	4	5	6	7	8	9	10	11	12	13	14	15	16	17	18	19	20	21	22	23	24	25	26	27	28	29	30
Kongsvinger	2	2	2	3	2	2	1	1	2	2	2	2	3	2	1	3	3	2	2	2	1									
Haugesund	3	3	1	4	3	6	5	3	3	3	3	3	2	1	2	1	1	3	3	1	2									
Stabæk	10	6	8	6	5	3	4	5	5	5	5	5	4	4	3	2	2	1	1	3	3									
Strømsgodset	5	10	6	7	6	4	2	2	1	1	1	1	1	3	4	4	4	4	4	4	4									
Hødd	5	9	12	11	9	8	8	9	6	7	8	11	8	6	6	6	6	5	5	5	5									
Odd	1	1	4	2	1	1	3	4	4	4	4	4	5	5	5	5	5	6	6	6	6									
Bryne	14	14	13	15	14	13	12	13	13	11	9	10	11	10	10	10	9	8	7	7	7									
Egersund	5	4	3	1	4	5	6	7	8	9	11	9	10	9	8	7	7	7	8	8	8									
Lyn	13	7	9	12	13	11	13	14	11	13	13	14	16	13	14	13	13	12	10	9	9									
Ranheim	8	8	5	8	7	7	9	6	7	6	6	6	6	8	7	8	8	9	9	10	10									
Sandnes Ulf	10	11	10	9	10	12	11	11	10	12	10	8	7	7	9	9	10	11	12	11	11									
Strømmen	8	13	11	10	11	14	14	15	16	16	16	16	14	16	16	15	15	16	14	13	12									
Moss	4	5	7	5	8	9	7	8	9	8	7	7	9	11	12	12	11	13	13	14	13									
Sogndal	15	15	15	13	12	10	10	10	12	10	12	12	12	12	11	11	12	10	11	12	14									
Åsane	16	16	16	16	16	16	16	16	15	15	14	15	13	15	15	16	16	14	15	15	15									
Raufoss	10	11	14	14	15	15	15	12	14	14	15	13	15	14	13	14	14	15	16	16	16									

Promotion to 2027 Eliteserien
Promotion play-offs
Relegation play-offs
Relegation to 2027 Second Division

Source: nifs.no

== Results by round ==
Team ╲ Round	1	2	3	4	5	6	7	8	9	10	11	12	13	14	15	16	17	18	19	20	21	22	23	24	25	26	27	28	29	30
Bryne	L	L	L	L	D	W	W	L	L	W	W	W	L	D	W	L	W	W	W	L	L									
Egersund	W	W	W	W	L	L	L	D	L	L	L	W	L	W	D	W	W	L	L	D	D									
Haugesund	W	W	W	L	W	L	D	W	W	W	W	L	W	W	L	W	W	L	W	W	W									
Hødd	W	L	L	D	W	W	D	L	W	L	L	D	W	W	L	W	W	W	L	W	D									
Kongsvinger	W	W	W	D	W	D	W	W	L	W	W	D	L	W	W	L	W	W	W	D	W									
Lyn	L	W	L	L	L	W	L	D	W	L	L	L	L	W	D	W	L	W	W	D	D									
Moss	W	W	L	W	L	L	W	D	L	D	W	L	L	L	L	L	D	L	D	L	W									
Odd	W	W	D	W	W	W	L	L	W	W	L	D	D	L	D	W	D	L	L	W	D									
Ranheim	D	W	W	L	W	D	L	W	L	W	L	W	L	L	L	L	W	L	L	L	D									
Raufoss	L	L	L	D	L	L	W	W	L	L	L	W	L	W	W	L	L	L	L	L	L									
Sandnes Ulf	L	L	W	D	L	L	W	L	W	L	W	W	W	D	L	L	L	L	L	W	D									
Sogndal	L	L	L	W	D	W	D	D	L	W	L	L	W	L	W	L	L	W	D	L	L									
Stabæk	L	W	D	W	W	W	L	D	W	D	W	L	W	W	W	W	W	W	W	L	L									
Strømmen	D	L	W	D	L	L	L	L	L	L	L	W	W	L	D	W	L	L	W	W	W									
Strømsgodset	W	L	W	D	W	W	W	D	W	W	W	D	D	L	D	W	L	W	W	W	D									
Åsane	L	L	L	L	L	L	D	W	W	L	W	L	W	L	D	L	L	W	L	D	D									

Source: Football Association of Norway (in Norwegian)
W = Win; D = Draw; L = Loss

== Play-offs ==
=== Promotion play-offs ===
The teams from third to sixth place will take part in the promotion play-offs; these are single-leg knockout matches. In the first round, the fifth-placed team will play at home against the sixth-placed team. The winner of the first round will meet the fourth-placed team away in the second round. The winner of the second round will meet the third-placed team away in the third round. The winner of the third round will face the 14th-placed team in the 2026 Eliteserien over two legs in the Eliteserien play-offs for a place in the 2027 Eliteserien.

==== Bracket ====
First round
5	Odd	1
6	Bryne	0

Second round
4	Stabæk
5	Odd

Third round
3	Kongsvinger

==== First round ====
22 November 2026
13:30 CET

Odd	1–0	Bryne
Simenstad 45'	Report

Skagerak Arena, Skien
Attendance: 4,191
Referee: Karl Espen Eriksen

==== Second round ====
29 November 2026
14:30 CET

Stabæk	v	Odd
	Report

Nadderud Stadion, Bærum

=== Relegation play-offs ===
The 14th-placed team will take part in a two-legged play-off against the winners of the Second Division play-offs, to decide who will play in the 2027 Norwegian First Division.

November 2026

v
Report

November 2026

v
Report

== Season statistics ==
=== Top scorers ===
As of 9 November 2026

Rank	Player	Club(s)	Goals
1	(Mali) Sory Ibrahim Diarra	Haugesund	31
2	(Norway) Mikael Tørset Johnsen	Ranheim	20
2	(Denmark) Sebastian Pingel	Strømsgodset	20
4	(Norway) Magnus Lankhof Dahlby	Stabæk	19
5	(Norway) Andreas Hellum	Lyn	17
5	(Norway) Ole Sebastian Sundgot	Sandnes ULF	17
7	(Norway) Elias Hoff Melkersen	Strømsgodset	16
7	(Norway) Faniel Tewelde	Odd	16
7	(Norway) Niclas Schjøth Semmen	Moss	16
10	(Norway) Rasmus Opdal Christiansen	Kongsvinger	15

=== Clean sheets ===
As of 3 August 2026

Rank	Player	Club	Clean sheets
1	(Norway) Marius Ulla	Stabæk	7
2	(Norway) Sebastian Hansen	Odd	6
2	(Faroe Islands) Mattias Lamhauge	Strømsgodset	6
4	(Norway) Sander Lønning	Egersund	5
5	(Norway) Alexander Pedersen	Lyn	4
5	(Norway) Tord Flolid	Sandnes Ulf	4
7	(Norway) Magnus Rugland Ree	Bryne	3
7	(Norway) Einar Bøe Fauskanger	Haugesund	3
7	(Sweden) Sebastian Selin	Åsane	3
10	(Norway) Thomas Kinn	Hødd	2

=== Hat-tricks ===
As of 7 September 2026

Player	For	Against	Result	Date
(Mali) Sory Ibrahim Diarra ^{4}	Haugesund	Lyn	4–2 (A)	6 April 2026
(Finland) Tuomas Pippola	Sogndal	Haugesund	5–1 (H)	10 May 2026
(Norway) Faniel Tewelde	Odd	Lyn	3–0 (H)	30 May 2026
(Mali) Sory Ibrahim Diarra	Haugesund	Raufoss	4–3 (A)	31 May 2026
(Mali) Sory Ibrahim Diarra	Haugesund	Ranheim	4–3 (A)	3 August 2026
(Norway) Elias Melkersen	Strømsgodset	Sogndal	3–2 (A)	30 August 2026
(Norway) Andreas Dybevik	Kongsvinger	Raufoss	9–1 (H)	5 September 2026

^{4} Player scored 4 goals
(H) – Home team
(A) – Away team

=== Discipline ===
As of 7 September 2026

==== Player ====
- Most yellow cards: 8
  - (Norway) Scott Vatne (Egersund)
  - (Faroe Islands) Gullbrandur Øregaard (Sandnes Ulf)
- Most red cards: 2
  - (Norway) Maximilian Mortensen Balatoni (Strømmen)

==== Club ====
- Most yellow cards: 48
  - Åsane
- Fewest yellow cards: 21
  - Ranheim
- Most red cards: 2
  - Moss
  - Sogndal
  - Strømmen
- Fewest red cards: 0
  - 3 teams

== Awards ==
=== Monthly awards ===
Month	Coach of the Month		Player of the Month		Young Player of the Month		References
Month	Coach	Club	Player	Club	Player	Club	References
April	(Denmark) Per Frandsen	Odd	(Mali) Sory Ibrahim Diarra	Haugesund	(Norway) Faniel Tewelde	Odd	
May	(Norway) Magne Hoseth	Strømsgodset	(Mali) Sory Ibrahim Diarra	Haugesund	(Denmark) Villum Dalsgaard	Hødd	
June/July	(Norway) Kjell André Thu	Stabæk	(Norway) William Wendt	Stabæk	(Norway) William Wendt	Stabæk	

== League attendances ==
Pos	Team	Total	High	Low	Average	Change
1	Strømsgodset	46,125	5,309	4,132	4,613	−12.5%^{1}
2	Odd	40,332	6,464	2,891	4,033	+22.5%
3	Stabæk	32,991	5,705	1,983	3,299	+34.2%
4	Haugesund	32,523	4,628	2,533	3,252	−13.3%^{1}
5	Kongsvinger	22,039	3,855	1,544	2,004	+10.5%
6	Lyn	17,885	3,470	1,253	1,789	−33.5%
7	Sogndal	17,858	2,422	1,582	1,786	−10.7%
8	Moss	14,332	3,057	1,098	1,592	−4.0%
9	Bryne	15,665	2,319	1,313	1,567	−48.6%^{1}
10	Sandnes Ulf	16,321	3,014	1,012	1,484	+43.7%^{2}
11	Hødd	12,985	2,096	1,014	1,299	−8.6%
12	Ranheim	11,596	1,388	900	1,054	+9.1%
13	Egersund	9,756	1,407	666	887	+1.7%
14	Raufoss	6,971	918	541	697	−28.7%
15	Åsane	4,273	637	252	388	−33.4%
16	Strømmen	3,636	512	228	331	+30.8%^{2}
	League total	305,288	6,464	228	1,817	−18.2%

Updated to games played on 7 September 2026
Source: nifs.no
Notes:
1: Team played last season in Eliteserien.
2: Team played last season in Second Division.

== See also ==
- 2026 Eliteserien
- 2026 Norwegian Second Division
- 2026 Norwegian Third Division
- 2025–26 Norwegian Football Cup
- 2026–27 Norwegian Football Cup
