= 2025 Odds BK season =

Odd
2025 season
- Chairman: Bernt Ove Søvik
- Manager: Knut Rønningene (until 15 September); Per Frandsen (from 17 September)
- Stadium: Skagerak Arena
- 1. divisjon: 9th
- 2025 Norwegian Cup: First round
- 2025–26 Norwegian Cup: Third round
- Top goalscorer: League: Torgeir Børven; Oliver Jordan Hagen (6 each); All: Oliver Jordan Hagen (7)
| Home colours | Away colours |

The 2025 season was the 132nd in the history of Odds BK and their first season in the second tier of Norwegian football. The club competed in the Norwegian First Division and the Norwegian Football Cup.

== Transfers ==
=== In ===
| Pos. | Player | Transferred from | Fee | Date | Source |
|---|---|---|---|---|---|
| MF | (Norway) Jesper Svenungsen Skau | (Norway) Mjøndalen | Loan return | 31 December 2024 | |
| FW | (Norway) Thomas Rekdal | (Norway) Tromsdalen | Loan return | 31 December 2024 | |
| FW | (Nigeria) Abduljeleel Abdulateef | (Nigeria) Bison FC | Undisclosed | 8 January 2025 | |
| DF | (Norway) Nikolas Walstad | (Norway) Haugesund | Undisclosed | 13 March 2025 | |
| FW | (Iceland) Hinrik Harðarson | (Iceland) ÍA Akranes | Undisclosed | 17 March 2025 | |
| MF | (Norway) Rafik Zekhnini | Unattached | Free | 10 April 2025 | |
| FW | (Cameroon) Ivan Djantou | (Denmark) Sønderjyske | Loan | 3 September 2025 | |

=== Out ===
| Pos. | Player | Transferred to | Fee | Date | Source |
|---|---|---|---|---|---|
| GK | (Norway) Peder Klausen | (Norway) Egersunds IK | | 13 December 2024 | |
| FW | (Norway) Anders Ryste | (Norway) Notodden | | 9 January 2025 | |
| DF | (Sweden) Leon Hien | (Sweden) Degerfors IF | | 10 January 2025 | |
| DF | (The Gambia) Sheriff Sinyan | (Romania) CFR Cluj | Free | 17 January 2025 | |
| FW | (Norway) Bork Bang-Kittilsen | (Sweden) Mjällby AIF | Undisclosed | 29 January 2025 | |
| MF | (Norway) Jesper Svenungsen Skau | (Norway) Mjøndalen | | 21 February 2025 | |
| DF | (Finland) Tony Miettinen | (Sweden) Mjällby AIF | | 28 February 2025 | |
| FW | (Norway) Thomas Rekdal | (Norway) Tromsdalen | | 6 March 2025 | |
| FW | (Norway) Casper Glenna Andersen | (Norway) Pors Fotball | Loan | 20 June 2025 | |
| FW | (Norway) Ole Erik Midtskogen | (Norway) Kjelsås | Contract terminated | 4 July 2025 | |

== Friendlies ==
=== Pre-season ===
| 24 January 2025 Friendly | Odd (Norway) | 4–1 | (Norway) Notodden |
| 15:00 |

| 31 January 2025 Friendly | Odd (Norway) | 3–1 | (Norway) Jerv |
| 15:00 |

| 8 February 2025 Friendly | Odd (Norway) | 3–0 | (Ukraine) LNZ Cherkasy | Spain |
| 16:00 |

| 1 March 2025 Friendly | Odd (Norway) | 1–2 | (Norway) Moss |
| 14:00 |

| 8 March 2025 Friendly | Odd (Norway) | 3–3 | (Norway) Egersund |
| 14:00 |

| 15 March 2025 Friendly | Lillestrøm (Norway) | 2–1 | (Norway) Odd |
| 14:00 |

| 23 March 2025 Friendly | Odd (Norway) | 0–2 | (Norway) Sandefjord |
| 15:00 |

== Competitions ==
=== Overview ===
| Competition | First match | Last match | Starting round | Final position | Record | | | | | | | |
| Competition | First match | Last match | Starting round | Final position | Pld | W | D | L | GF | GA | GD | Win % |
|---|---|---|---|---|---|---|---|---|---|---|---|---|
| First Division | 31 March 2025 | 8 November 2025 | Matchday 1 | 9th | 30 | 8 | 9 | 13 | 37 | 50 | −13 | 26.67 |
| 2025 Norwegian Football Cup | 13 April 2025 | | First round | First round | 1 | 0 | 0 | 1 | 2 | 3 | −1 | 0.00 |
| 2026 Norwegian Football Cup | 13 August 2025 | 25 September 2025 | First round | Third round | 3 | 1 | 1 | 1 | 6 | 6 | +0 | 33.33 |
| Total | | | | | 34 | 9 | 10 | 15 | 45 | 59 | −14 | 26.47 |

Source: Competitions

=== First Division ===
==== League table ====
| Pos | Team | Pld | W | D | L | GF | GA | GD | Pts |
|---|---|---|---|---|---|---|---|---|---|
| 7 | Lyn | 30 | 14 | 5 | 11 | 48 | 37 | +11 | 47 |
| 8 | Sogndal | 30 | 12 | 7 | 11 | 49 | 48 | +1 | 43 |
| 9 | Odd | 30 | 8 | 9 | 13 | 37 | 50 | −13 | 33 |
| 10 | Hødd | 30 | 8 | 9 | 13 | 34 | 52 | −18 | 33 |
| 11 | Stabæk | 30 | 7 | 10 | 13 | 45 | 53 | −8 | 31 |

Source: OBOS-ligaen (in Norwegian)
Rules for classification: 1) Points; 2) Goal difference; 3) Goals scored; 4) Head-to-head points; 5) Head-to-head goal difference; 6) Head-to-head goals scored.

==== Results summary ====
| Overall | | | | | | | | Home | | | | | | Away | | | | | |
| Pld | W | D | L | GF | GA | GD | Pts | W | D | L | GF | GA | GD | W | D | L | GF | GA | GD |
|---|---|---|---|---|---|---|---|---|---|---|---|---|---|---|---|---|---|---|---|
| 30 | 8 | 9 | 13 | 37 | 50 | −13 | 33 | 6 | 4 | 5 | 20 | 24 | −4 | 2 | 5 | 8 | 17 | 26 | −9 |

Source: NFF

==== Results by round ====
| Round | 1 | 2 | 3 | 4 | 5 | 6 | 7 | 8 | 9 | 10 | 11 | 12 | 13 | 14 | 15 | 16 | 17 | 18 | 19 | 20 | 21 | 22 | 23 | 24 | 25 | 26 | 27 | 28 | 29 | 30 |
|---|---|---|---|---|---|---|---|---|---|---|---|---|---|---|---|---|---|---|---|---|---|---|---|---|---|---|---|---|---|---|
| Ground | H | A | H | A | H | A | H | A | H | A | H | A | H | A | H | A | H | A | A | H | A | H | A | H | A | H | H | A | H | A |
| Result | W | L | W | L | D | W | W | L | W | D | D | L | D | L | W | L | L | L | D | L | D | L | W | W | D | D | L | D | L | L |
| Position | 3 | 10 | 6 | 8 | 7 | 6 | 4 | 7 | 4 | 4 | 5 | 7 | 7 | 8 | 6 | 8 | 9 | 10 | 9 | 11 | 12 | 13 | 10 | 9 | 9 | 9 | 9 | 9 | 9 | 9 |

Source: NFF
A = Away; H = Home; W = Win; D = Draw; L = Loss

==== Matches ====
| 31 March 2025 1 | Odd | 2–1 | Skeid | Skien |
| 19:00 | Hagen 3'; Owusu 45+3' | | Rise 37' | Stadium: Skagerak Arena; Attendance: 3,915; Referee: Eivind Bodding |

| 5 April 2025 2 | Lillestrøm | 1–0 | Odd | Lillestrøm |
| 16:00 UTC+2 | Lehne Olsen 81' | | | Stadium: Åråsen Stadion; Attendance: 7,555; Referee: Magnus Nicolai Koløy |

| 21 April 2025 3 | Odd | 2–1 | Lyn | Skien |
| 17:00 | Aas 57' (pen.); Zekhnini 60' | | Myhre 75' | Stadium: Skagerak Arena; Attendance: 4,022; Referee: Ole-Alexander Ekeli Valen |

| 28 April 2025 4 | Sogndal | 3–2 | Odd | Sogndal |
| 19:00 | | | | Stadium: Fosshaugane Campus; Attendance: 1,637; Referee: Mohammad Hafezi |

| 3 May 2025 5 | Odd | 1–1 | Egersund | Skien |
| 16:00 |

| 12 May 2025 6 | Kongsvinger | 1–3 | Odd |
| 19:00 |

| 16 May 2025 7 | Odd | 2–0 | Moss |
| 18:00 |

| 25 May 2025 8 | Hødd | 3–1 | Odd |
| 17:00 |

| 31 May 2025 9 | Odd | 1–0 | Åsane |
| 16:00 |

| 15 June 2025 10 | Raufoss | 1–1 | Odd |
| 17:00 |

| 18 June 2025 11 | Odd | 1–1 | Mjøndalen |
| 19:00 |

| 21 June 2025 12 | Aalesund | 1–0 | Odd |
| 16:00 |

| 28 June 2025 13 | Odd | 2–2 | Start |
| 16:00 |

| 26 July 2025 14 | Ranheim | 3–1 | Odd |
| 14:00 |

| 30 July 2025 15 | Odd | 2–0 | Stabæk |
| 18:00 |

| 2 August 2025 16 | Egersund | 1–0 | Odd |
| 16:00 |

| 6 August 2025 18 | Start | 2–0 | Odd |
| 19:00 |

| 10 August 2025 17 | Odd | 1–2 | Raufoss |
| 17:00 |

| 17 August 2025 19 | Moss | 2–2 | Odd |
| 17:00 |

| 23 August 2025 20 | Odd | 1–2 | Kongsvinger |
| 16:00 |

| 31 August 2025 21 | Lyn | 0–0 | Odd |
| 19:00 |

| 13 September 2025 22 | Odd | 1–2 | Hødd |
| 16:00 |

| 20 September 2025 23 | Åsane | 0–2 | Odd |
| 16:00 |

| 29 September 2025 24 | Odd | 1–0 | Aalesund |
| 19:00 |

| 5 October 2025 25 | Stabæk | 2–2 | Odd |
| 17:00 |

| 18 October 2025 26 | Odd | 1–1 | Ranheim |
| 16:00 |

| 22 October 2025 27 | Odd | 1–7 | Lillestrøm |
| 18:00 |

| 25 October 2025 28 | Mjøndalen | 1–1 | Odd |
| 16:00 |

| 1 November 2025 29 | Odd | 1–4 | Sogndal |
| 16:00 |

| 8 November 2025 30 | Skeid | 5–2 | Odd |
| 16:00 |

=== 2025 Norwegian Football Cup ===
| 13 April 2025 First round | Flint | 3–2 | Odd | Tønsberg |
| 14:00 | Srour 24' (pen.); Bruun 76'; Ramstad 83' | | Aas 56' (pen.); Hardarson 89' | Stadium: Flint ESSO Arena A KG; Attendance: 500; Referee: Pavel Breivik |

=== 2026 Norwegian Football Cup ===
| 13 August 2025 First round | Pors Fotball | 1–3 | Odd |
| 18:00 |

| 27 August 2025 Second round | Strømmen | 2–2 (2–4 p) | Odd |
| 18:00 |

| 25 September 2025 Third round | Odd | 1–3 | Bodø/Glimt |
| 18:00 |
