= Ole Sundgot =

Ole Sundgot may refer to:

- Ole Bjørn Sundgot (born 1972), Norwegian former professional footballer and manager
- Ole Sebastian Sundgot (born 2001), Norwegian footballer
