= Adrian Rogulj =

Norwegian footballer (born 1996)

Personal information
- Date of birth: 3 April 1999 (age 27)
- Place of birth: Drammen, Norway
- Height: 1.93 m (6 ft 4 in)
- Position: Forward

Team information
- Current team: Raufoss
- Number: 9

Youth career
- –2018: Strømsgodset

Senior career*
Years	Team	Apps	(Gls)
2016–2017	Strømsgodset 3	38	(12)
2017–2018	Strømsgodset 2	31	(6)
2019–2020	Bærum	27	(4)
2019	→ Bærum 2	4	(2)
2021	Levanger	9	(3)
2022–2024	Ørn Horten	60	(31)
2024–2025	Emmen	12	(0)
2025	→ Oddevold (loan)	5	(0)
2025	Egersund	7	(0)
2026–	Raufoss	27	(8)
- * Club domestic league appearances and goals as of 14 November 2026

Adrian Rogulj (born 3 April 1999) is a Norwegian professional footballer who plays as a forward for Raufoss.

== Early life ==
Rogulj was born on 3 April 1999. Born in Drammen, Norway, he is of Croatian descent through his father.

== Career ==
As a youth player, Rogulj joined the youth academy of Norwegian side Strømsgodset Toppfotball and was promoted to the club's reserve team in 2017, where he made thirty-one league appearances and scored six goals. Two years later, he signed for Bærum SK, where he made twenty-seven league appearances and scored four goals. Ahead of the 2021 season, he signed for Levanger FK, where he made nine league appearances and scored three goals.

Subsequently, he signed for FK Ørn Horten, where he was the club's top scorer during the 2022 season with thirteen league goals. Following his stint there, he signed for Dutch side FC Emmen in 2024. Dutch news website RTV Drenthe wrote in 2025 that "in the first half of the season, Rogulj slowly disappeared from view at FC Emmen... a disappointing half year in which Rogulj did not score" while playing for the club. Six months later, he was sent on loan to Swedish side IK Oddevold.

On 14 July 2025, Rogulj signed with Norwegian First Division side Egersunds IK, on a contract until end of 2026.

On 30 Desember 2025, Rogulj sign with Norwegian First Division side Raufoss Fotball, on a contract until end of 2027.
