= Arendal Fotball =

Norwegian football club

Arendal
- Full name: Arendal Fotball
- Founded: 27 September 2010; 16 years ago
- Ground: Bjønnes stadion
- Chairman: Jan Sigurd Otterlei
- Coach: Roger Risholt
- League: 2. divisjon
- 2024: 2. divisjon group 1, 10th of 14
- Website: http://www.arendalfotball.no/
Home colours	Away colours

Arendal Fotball is a Norwegian professional football club based in Arendal. The club competes in the 2. divisjon, the third tier of football in Norway.

== History ==
It was established on 27 September 2010, and started contesting in the 2011 3. divisjon which is the fourth tier of the Norwegian league system. In its second season, in 2012, the team won promotion to third tier. From 2013 to 2016 the team played in the third tier of the Norwegian league system, and won promotion to the second tier in 2016.

The club is an umbrella team for IK Grane and IF Trauma. The two clubs had tried fielding an umbrella team earlier from 2000 to 2008, called FK Arendal. FK Arendal never reached the same level as Arendal Fotball.

=== Men's team ===
Season		Pos.	Pl.	W	D	L	GS	GA	P	Cup	Notes
2011	3. divisjon	3	24	15	2	7	82	41	47	1st round	
2012	3. divisjon	↑ 1	26	24	1	1	129	22	73	2nd round	Promoted
2013	2. divisjon	5	26	11	4	11	36	42	37	1st round	
2014	2. divisjon	8	26	10	4	12	47	58	34	2nd round	
2015	2. divisjon	7	26	9	7	10	46	51	34	3rd round	
2016	2. divisjon	↑ 1	26	19	6	1	75	24	63	1st round	Promoted
2017	1. divisjon	↓ 16	30	5	6	19	33	62	21	2nd round	Relegated
2018	2. divisjon	6	26	10	6	10	37	34	36	2nd round	
2019	2. divisjon	6	26	12	3	11	49	40	39	2nd round	
2020	2. divisjon	5	19	9	5	5	32	18	32	Cancelled	
2021	2. divisjon	2	26	13	9	4	57	38	48	3rd round	
2022	2. divisjon	2	24	18	2	4	55	35	56	2nd round	
2023	2. divisjon	3	26	13	5	8	55	38	44	2nd round	
2024	2. divisjon	10	26	10	3	13	34	41	33	3rd round	
2025	2. divisjon	5	26	10	11	5	59	36	41	1st round	
2026	2. divisjon									2nd round	

== Players ==
=== Current squad ===
As of 2 September 2026

Note: Flags indicate national team as defined under FIFA eligibility rules; some limited exceptions apply. Players may hold more than one non-FIFA nationality.

No.	Pos.	Nation	Player
1	GK	NOR	Andreas Smedplass
2	DF	NOR	Syver Skaar Eriksen
3	DF	GER	George Gitau
4	DF	NOR	Henrik Osnes
5	DF	SWE	Tim Olsson
6	DF	NOR	Marius Aamodt Eriksen
7	MF	NOR	Andreas Skjold
8	MF	NOR	Marius Trengereid
9	FW	NOR	Torben Dvergsdal
10	FW	NOR	Sander Lille-Løvø
11	FW	NOR	Marcus Victorio
13	GK	NOR	Sindre Østbø

No.	Pos.	Nation	Player
14	FW	SWE	Kevin Rodeblad Lowe
15	DF	CAN	Antony Ćurić
16	DF	NOR	Eivind Helgesen
17	MF	NOR	Håkon Suggelia
18	MF	NOR	Simen Nygaard
20	FW	NOR	Andreas Østerud
21	FW	NOR	Vetle Wenaas (on loan from FK Jerv)
22	MF	NOR	Mohammed Badran
25	MF	NOR	Adrian Nilsen
27	FW	NOR	Joakim Berg Nundal
28	MF	NOR	Marius Altenborg
42	MF	NOR	Marius Hurvenes

=== Out on loan ===
Note: Flags indicate national team as defined under FIFA eligibility rules; some limited exceptions apply. Players may hold more than one non-FIFA nationality.

No. / Pos. / Nation / Player	No. / Pos. / Nation / Player
