= Thomas Lillo =

Norwegian footballer (born 1997)

Personal information
- Full name: Thomas Romo Lillo
- Date of birth: 11 November 1997 (age 29)
- Place of birth: Norway
- Height: 1.86 m (6 ft 1 in)
- Position: Central defender

Team information
- Current team: Strømmen
- Number: 98

Youth career
- -2009: Siggerud
- 2009-2012: Ski
- 2013: Langhus
- 2013-2016: Follo

Senior career*
Years	Team	Apps	(Gls)
2017–2020	Follo	68	(1)
2021	Notodden	25	(4)
2022–2023	Hødd	52	(3)
2024	B36 Tórshavn	14	(1)
2025–	Strømmen	51	(5)
- * Club domestic league appearances and goals as of 14 November 2026

Thomas Lillo (born 11 November 1997) is a Norwegian professional footballer who currently plays for Strømmen as central defender. He has previously played for Hødd in the second and third tier of Norwegian football. and for Notodden in the third tier of Norwegian football.

== Club career ==
Thomas Lillo started his senior career in the third-tier club Follo FK. After spending three seasons there he moved to Notodden, where he played for one season. He then moved to Hødd, where he stayed for two seasons.

When Hødd was relegated after the 2023 season, Lillo decided to leave the club. He then joined the Faroese top-tier club B36 Tórshavn, where he was reunited with his old teammate Jann Benjaminsen
