= Oliver Jordan Hagen =

Norwegian footballer (born 2006)

Personal information
- Date of birth: 9 June 2006 (age 20)
- Position: Forward

Team information
- Current team: Hammarby IF
- Number: 15

Youth career
- –2020: Borg
- 2021–2024: Odd

Senior career*
Years	Team	Apps	(Gls)
2024–2026	Odd	37	(6)
2026–	Hammarby IF	15	(0)

International career^{‡}
2021	Norway U15	2	(0)
2022	Norway U16	1	(0)
- * Club domestic league appearances and goals as of 22 September 2026 ‡ National team caps and goals as of 2 January 2026

Oliver Jordan Hagen (born 9 June 2006) is a Norwegian footballer who plays for Allsvenskan side Hammarby IF.

== Club career ==
He played youth football for IF Borg before joining the academy of Odds BK in 2021. In late 2023, the local press counted on him being a part of the first-team squad in 2024, and the deal was signed in January 2024. Hagen made his first-team debut in April 2024, first in the cup against Åskollen and three months later in the league against Hamkam. He did not score until 2025, when Odd had been relegated to the First Division. (Note: Oliver Jordan Hagen at the Norwegian Football Federation (in Norwegian))

He became a regular in 2025, playing all 30 league games. Odd rejected a transfer bid from Sarpsborg 08 in July 2025, possibly demanding up to 10 million kr for the player.

== Personal life ==
He is a son of former Odd captain Knut Helge Hagen.
