= Hans Christian Bonnesen =

Danish footballer (born 2001)

Personal information
- Date of birth: 17 March 2001 (age 25)
- Height: 1.87 m (6 ft 2 in)
- Position: Centre-back

Team information
- Current team: Odd
- Number: 5

Youth career
- –2021: Helsingør

Senior career*
Years	Team	Apps	(Gls)
2021–2021	Helsingør		
2021–2024	Fremad Amager	67	(6)
2024	Køge	33	(3)
2025–	Odd	36	(3)
- * Club domestic league appearances and goals as of 31 August 2026

Hans Christian Bonnesen (born 17 March 2001) is a Danish footballer who plays as a centre-back for Odds BK.

== Career ==
Coming up through the academy of FC Helsingør, he received a senior contract in April 2019 and made his first-team debut in 2019 in the 2nd Division.

He left Helsingør for Fremad Amager in the summer of 2021, signing a pre-contract in March. He was brought to HB Køge in 2024. Having played every match during the 2024-25 Danish 1st Division, Bonnesen was regarded as reliable. In the summer of 2025 was sought after by Norwegian second-tier club Odds BK and signed for them. The prize was described as "inexpensive" for Odd. Settling into his first foreign club, ahead of the 2026 season he was named as team captain. His performances varied.

== Personal life ==
He is nicknamed Kritte.
