= Ivan Djantou =

Cameroonian footballer (born 2002)

Personal information
- Full name: Ivan Cabrel Djantou Tchaboutang
- Date of birth: 14 March 2002 (age 24)
- Place of birth: Douala, Cameroon
- Height: 1.91 m (6 ft 3 in)
- Position: Forward

Team information
- Current team: Aalesund
- Number: 20

Senior career*
Years	Team	Apps	(Gls)
2022–2023	Les Astres	8	(4)
2023–2024	Skënderbeu	17	(1)
2024–2026	Sønderjyske	30	(4)
2025	→ Odd (loan)	9	(2)
2026–	Aalesund	8	(1)

International career
	Cameroon U23	6	(8)
- * Club domestic league appearances and goals as of 23 July 2026

Ivan Cabrel Djantou Tchaboutang (born 14 March 2002) is a Cameroonian professional footballer who plays as a forward for Eliteserien club Aalesund.

== Career ==
On 14 June 2024, Sønderjyske from Denmark, announced the signing of Djantou, making a contract until June 2028. On September 3, 2025, Djantou transferred to the Norwegian First Division side Odds BK on a loan deal until the end of the year. Following the conclusion of the season, it was reported that Djantou and Odd were in discussions regarding a continued collaboration; however, no agreement had been reached before the expiration of his loan deal.

On 12 January 2026, Djantou signed a contract until June 2029 with Eliteserien club Aalesund.

== Career statistics ==
As of match played 22 May 2024

Appearances and goals by club, season and competition
Club	Season	League			National cup		Continental		Total	
Club	Season	Division	Apps	Goals	Apps	Goals	Apps	Goals	Apps	Goals
Skënderbeu	2023–24	Kategoria Superiore	17	1	1	0	—		18	1
Career total			17	1	1	0	—		18	1
