= Levanger FK =

Norwegian football club

Levanger
- Full name: Levanger Fotballklubb
- Founded: 20 May 1996; 30 years ago
- Ground: Moan Fritidspark
- Capacity: 6,000
- Head coach: Jo Sondre Aas
- League: 2. divisjon
- 2025: 2. divisjon, 10th of 14
Home colours	Away colours

Levanger Fotballklubb is a Norwegian football club located in Levanger Municipality. The club currently plays in the 2. divisjon, the third tier of the Norwegian football league system. Founded 20 May 1996, Levanger FK is the result of a merger between SK Nessegutten and IL Sverre.

== Recent history ==
Season		Pos.	Pl.	W	D	L	GS	GA	P	Cup	Notes
2006	2. divisjon	12	26	7	8	11	48	50	29	Third round	
2007	2. divisjon	10	26	8	6	12	44	61	30	First round	
2008	2. divisjon	5	26	14	2	10	47	49	44	Second round	
2009	2. divisjon	11	26	10	2	14	26	58	32	Second round	
2010	2. divisjon	10	26	8	5	13	46	50	29	Second round	
2011	2. divisjon	7	26	12	3	11	52	45	39	Second round	
2012	2. divisjon	8	26	10	4	12	53	48	34	First round	
2013	2. divisjon	3	26	13	5	8	61	43	44	Third round	
2014	2. divisjon	↑ 1	26	16	6	4	64	29	54	Second round	Promoted to 1. divisjon
2015	1. divisjon	9	30	10	6	14	48	53	36	Third round	
2016	1. divisjon	8	30	13	6	11	52	46	45	Second round	
2017	1. divisjon	7	30	10	12	8	39	36	42	Third round	
2018	1. divisjon	↓ 16	30	3	6	21	32	71	15	Third round	Relegated to 2. divisjon
2019	2. divisjon	5	26	13	2	11	38	40	41	Third round	
2020	2. divisjon	8	13	5	4	4	20	18	17	Cancelled	
2021	2. divisjon	4	26	13	4	9	65	41	43	Second round	
2022	2. divisjon	3	26	12	7	7	62	38	43	Second round	
2023	2. divisjon	↑ 1	26	22	4	0	74	17	70	Second round	Promoted to 1. divisjon
2024	1. divisjon	↓ 15	30	6	11	13	47	51	29	Quarter-final	Relegated to 2. divisjon
2025	2. divisjon	10	26	8	7	11	37	44	31	Second round	
2026	2. divisjon	3	26	18	1	7	64	32	55	Third round	

== Current squad ==
As of 5 September 2026

Note: Flags indicate national team as defined under FIFA eligibility rules; some limited exceptions apply. Players may hold more than one non-FIFA nationality.

No.	Pos.	Nation	Player
1	GK	ISL	Steingrímur Ingi Gunnarsson
2	DF	NOR	Daniel Pollen
3	DF	NOR	Jesper Myklebust
5	DF	NOR	Håvard Lorentzen
6	MF	NOR	Kjartan Ulstad
7	MF	SWE	Ermal Hajdari
8	FW	NOR	Haakon Rusten Berge
9	FW	NOR	Eivind Tøgersen
11	FW	NOR	Magnus Fagernes
12	GK	SWE	Christopher Lundhall
14	MF	NOR	Isak Holmen (on loan from Rosenborg)
15	MF	NOR	Shan Beyene

No.	Pos.	Nation	Player
16	FW	NOR	Tellef Ytterland
17	FW	NOR	Magnus Høiseth
18	FW	NOR	Magnus Moen
19	DF	NOR	Sivert Valstad
20	FW	NOR	Jonas Lian Horten
21	FW	NOR	Magnus Holte (on loan from Rosenborg)
22	FW	NOR	Patrick Johansen
23	MF	NOR	Marius Waterloo Høstland
30	DF	NOR	Oliver Bjørnli
31	MF	NOR	Iver Skreden
32	DF	NOR	Sander Sundnes
