= Føyka Stadion =

Sports stadium

- Interactive map of Føyka Stadion
- Location: Asker, Norway
- Coordinates: 59.834889°N 10.427929°E
- Capacity: 2,000

Construction
- Opened: 1 July 1950
- Renovated: 1 June 1999

Tenant
- Asker Fotball (football)

Føyka Stadion (also called Asker Stadion) is a sports stadium in Asker, Norway with running track. It is currently used mostly for association football matches, and is the home ground of Asker Fotball. The stadium has a capacity of 2,000.
