= Ole Sebastian Sundgot =

Norwegian footballer (born 2001)

Personal information
- Date of birth: 12 January 2001 (age 25)
- Position: Striker

Team information
- Current team: Sandnes Ulf
- Number: 9

Youth career
- –2020: Molde

Senior career*
Years	Team	Apps	(Gls)
2020	Molde	1	(0)
2021–2023	Ull/Kisa	65	(28)
2023	Skeid	9	(0)
2024	Brattvåg	25	(21)
2025–	Sandnes Ulf	56	(41)
- * Club domestic league appearances and goals as of 14 November 2026

Ole Sebastian Sundgot (born 12 January 2001) is a Norwegian football striker who plays for Sandnes Ulf.

== Career ==
A youth player for Molde FK, Sundgot was also called up to train with the Norwegian national team, but was never capped. In November 2019 he was allowed on the bench for Molde's senior team for the first time, and he made his Eliteserien debut as a substitute in December 2020.

However, Sundgot would not play for Molde again. During the pre-season of 2021, he trained with Ull/Kisa, where his uncle Arild Sundgot was assistant manager, and signed for the club in February 2021. After a somewhat slow start, he scored four goals between 12 June and 12 July 2021.

In September 2023 Ull/Kisa had to sell Sundgot due to poor finances. They also had to sell Sondre Sørløkk and Jonas Pereira, but Sundgot was the top goalscorer of the club at the time. The buying club was Skeid, where he was unable to prevent the club being relegated from the 2023 1. divisjon. Instead of following Skeid into the 2024 1. divisjon, Sundgot transferred to Brattvåg IL on the same tier. He quickly became a contender for top goalscorer of the league. After 14 goals in 14 matches, he was brought to Eliteserien club Kristiansund BK for a trial. His 20th goal across both league and cup came in mid-September.

== Personal life ==
He is a son of Ole Bjørn Sundgot, and also nephew of Arild Sundgot and grandson of Otto Sundgot. His father and uncle also played as forwards. He lost his brother Simen in 2018.

== Honours ==
Individual

- Norwegian Cup Top scorer: 2025–26 Norwegian Cup
