= Flekkerøy IL =

Norwegian sports club

Fløy IL
- Full name: Flekkerøy Idrettslag
- Founded: 29 July 1950; 75 years ago
- Ground: Flekkerøy stadion
- Capacity: 1,500
- Head coach: Jóhannes Harðarson
- League: 2. divisjon
- 2024: 2. divisjon group 1, 11th of 14
- Website: http://www.floy.no/
Home colours	Away colours

Flekkerøy Idrettslag, also called Fløy is a Norwegian sports club from Flekkerøy in Kristiansand. It has sections for association football and team handball, in addition to cross-country skiing and racket sport.

== Football ==
The men's football team currently plays in the 2. divisjon, the third tier of the Norwegian football league system, after winning promotion from the 2019 3. divisjon. Flekkerøy stadium is their home ground. Their team colors are blue and white.

=== Recent seasons ===
Season	League									Cup	Notes
Season	Division	Pos.	Pl.	W	D	L	GS	GA	P	Cup	Notes
2011	2. divisjon	7	26	10	5	11	36	38	35	Second round	
2012	2. divisjon	2	26	14	4	8	53	30	46	First round	
2013	2. divisjon	12	26	8	6	12	40	45	30	Third round	
2014	2. divisjon	6	26	11	7	8	56	45	40	First round	
2015	2. divisjon	9	26	8	7	11	30	44	31	First round	
2016	2. divisjon	↓ 14	26	3	0	23	37	74	9	First round	Relegated
2017	3. divisjon	↑ 1	26	21	2	3	76	29	65	Third round	Promoted
2018	2. divisjon	↓ 12	26	7	7	12	39	55	28	First round	Relegated
2019	3. divisjon	↑ 1	26	23	3	0	86	17	72	First round	Promoted
2020	2. divisjon	6	18	6	3	9	21	27	21	Cancelled	
2021	2. divisjon	11	26	5	12	9	30	38	27	Third round	
2022	2. divisjon	4	24	13	4	7	46	32	43	Second round	

== Players ==
=== Current squad ===
As of 25 August 2025

Note: Flags indicate national team as defined under FIFA eligibility rules; some limited exceptions apply. Players may hold more than one non-FIFA nationality.

No.	Pos.	Nation	Player
1	GK	NOR	Markus Kristiansen
2	DF	NOR	Alejandro Sørum
3	FW	NOR	Henrik Byklum
4	DF	NOR	Jesper Gravdahl
5	DF	NOR	Ron Quranolli
6	MF	NOR	William Drange Johnsen
7	MF	NOR	Sander Richardsen (on loan from IK Start)
8	MF	NOR	Dirirsa Gamachis
9	FW	NOR	Peter Frostad
10	MF	NOR	Henrik Andersen
11	FW	NOR	Elias Nahiry
12	GK	NOR	Isak Solberg (on loan from Skeid)
13	MF	NOR	Preben Skeie

No.	Pos.	Nation	Player
14	FW	NOR	Mathias Tjoland
15	DF	NOR	Felix Lillehammer (on loan from Jerv)
16	MF	NOR	Mathias Myhre Madsen
17	DF	NOR	Ola Rønningen
18	MF	NOR	Eivind Johnsen
19	FW	NOR	Gaute Kvalsvik
21	FW	NOR	Aksel Kloster
22	MF	NOR	Sakarias Ringsbu
23	FW	NOR	Jonas Seim (on loan from IK Start)
24	MF	NOR	Adrian Barosen
25	MF	NOR	Levi Eftevaag
27	FW	NOR	Elias Kristensen
30	DF	NOR	Nikolas Brandal
