= Brattvåg IL =

Norwegian sports club

- Full name: Brattvåg Idrettslag
- Founded: 1940
- Ground: Brattvåg gras, Brattvåg
- Head coach: René Skovdahl
- League: 2. divisjon
- 2024: 2. divisjon group 1, 4th of 14
Home colours	Away colours

Brattvåg Idrettslag is a Norwegian sports club from the village of Brattvåg in the municipality of Ålesund in Møre og Romsdal county, Norway. It has sections for association football and Nordic skiing. The club was established in 1940.

The men's football team currently plays in the 2. divisjon, the third tier of the Norwegian football league system. The team was promoted from the 3. divisjon in 2017 and played last in the 2. divisjon in 1996 and 2016. Their current head coach is Rene Skovdahl. The women's football team plays in the 3. divisjon.

== Current squad ==
Updated 1 September 2026

Note: Flags indicate national team as defined under FIFA eligibility rules; some limited exceptions apply. Players may hold more than one non-FIFA nationality.

No.	Pos.	Nation	Player
1	GK	CAN	Kieran Baskett (on loan from Lierse)
2	DF	NOR	Iver Krogh Hansen
3	DF	NOR	Jonas Valland
4	MF	NOR	Karim Bata
5	DF	PHI	Adrian Ugelvik
6	MF	NOR	Fredrik Vinje
7	MF	NOR	Andreas Tveiten (on loan from Molde)
8	MF	NOR	Jacob Kvarven
9	MF	NOR	Rasmus Løvseth
10	MF	NOR	Emil Dahle
11	FW	NOR	Oliver Henriksrud

No.	Pos.	Nation	Player
12	GK	NOR	Jarik Sundling
15	MF	NOR	Andreas Myklebust
16	MF	NOR	Ruben Kolseth Myers
17	MF	NOR	John Ruud Norvik
18	DF	NOR	Jørgen Havig
19	DF	WAL	Sam Tattum
20	MF	NOR	Leandro Neto
21	DF	BDI	Diedrick Bubahe
23	FW	NOR	Sivert Solli
24	GK	NOR	Owen Hjelme Connor

== Recent history ==
Season	Div.	Pos.	Pl.	W	D	L	GS	GA	Pts	Cup	Notes
2010	3. divisjon	5	22	9	4	9	46	46	31	First qualifying round	
2011	3. divisjon	10	26	10	3	13	47	66	33	First qualifying round	
2012	3. divisjon	3	26	14	6	6	65	41	48	First qualifying round	
2013	3. divisjon	2	26	15	4	7	68	34	49	First round	
2014	3. divisjon	2	26	17	4	5	88	35	55	First round	
2015	3. divisjon	↑ 1	26	20	4	2	67	21	64	First round	Promoted
2016	2. divisjon	↓ 9	26	11	5	10	41	37	38	Fourth round	Relegated
2017	3. divisjon	↑ 1	26	17	5	4	78	27	56	First round	Promoted
2018	2. divisjon	8	26	11	2	13	37	51	35	Third round	
2019	2. divisjon	9	26	9	6	11	43	50	33	Second round	
2020	2. divisjon	6	13	5	4	4	26	17	19	Cancelled	
2021	2. divisjon	5	26	12	5	9	55	48	41	Second round	
2022	2. divisjon	9	26	10	3	13	47	52	33	Second round	
