= Jessheim Stadion =

Football stadium in Jessheim, Norway

- Interactive map of Jessheim Stadion
- Former names: UKI Arena
- Location: Aktivitetsveien 7, 2069 Jessheim; Norway
- Coordinates: 60°09′02″N 11°9′52″E
- Capacity: 4,500
- Surface: Artificial turf
- Record attendance: 3,435 (Ull/Kisa vs Rosenborg, 19 June 2019)
- Field size: 105 by 68 metres (114.8 yd × 74.4 yd)

Construction
- Opened: August 2011
- Renovated: 2018

Tenant
- Ull/Kisa (2011–present)

Jessheim Stadion (previously called UKI Arena for sponsorship reasons) is a football stadium located at Jessheim in Ullensaker, Norway. Opened in August 2011, it is home of the First Division side Ullensaker/Kisa IL (Ull/Kisa). The venue consists of an all-seater grandstand with 1,130 under-roof seats on the one long side and a media center on the other side. One of the stands on the short sides has a roof, the other has not. The pitch has artificial turf and the dimensions 105 by 68 meters (115 by 74 yd).

17 November 2015, Ull/Kisa's board decided that the arena would change its name from UKI Arena to Jessheim Stadion ahead of the 2016 season.

Stand names and capacities
Stand	Location	Capacity
Aurskog Sparebank Stand	North	860
No stand	West	0
Main Stand	East	1,130
No name	South	372

== Average attendances ==
This shows the average attendance on Ull/Kisa's home games in the league since the opening of Jessheim Stadion in 2012.

†	1. divisjon
	2. divisjon

Attendance
Season	Avg	Min	Max	Rank	Ref.
2011	N/A				
2012	774	281	1,620	10†	
2013	532	293	1,457	14†	
2014	398	206	933	15†	
2015	N/A				
2016	640	250	1,112	13†	
2017	713	511	1,067	11†	
2018	738	465	1,332	10†	
