= TUIL Arena =

Football stadium in Tromsø, Norway

Coordinates: 69°38′45″N 19°1′5″E

Tromsdalen Stadion
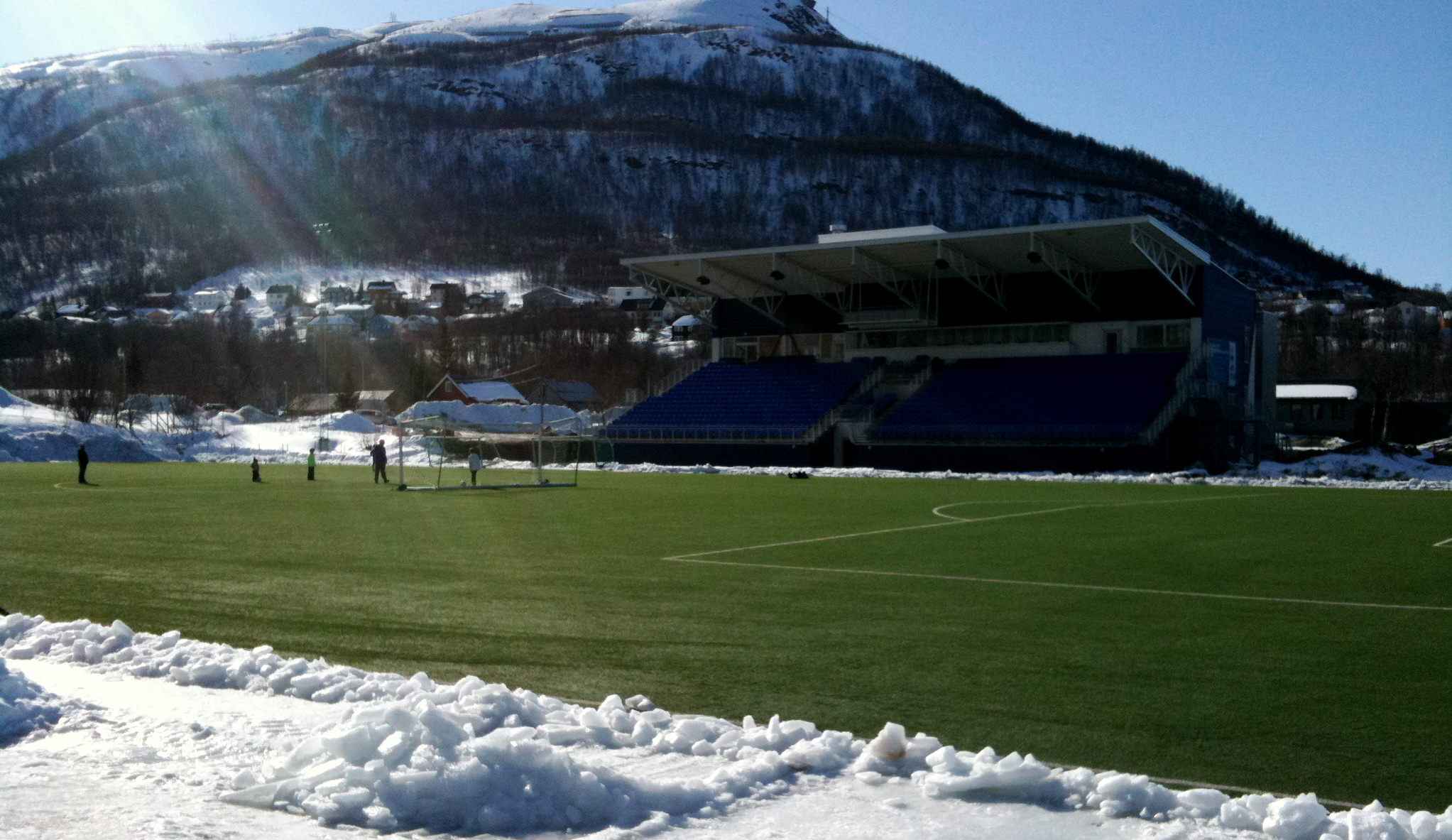
- Interactive map of Tromsdalen Stadion

Construction
- Opened: 1983

Tenant
- Tromsdalen UIL (1983–)

TUIL Arena is an association football venue located in Tromsø, Norway, Opened in 1983, it is the home ground of Tromsdalen UIL, which plays in the First Division. The pitch is owned by the club and has artificial turf. It will be superseded by TUIL Arena that is planned to open in 2010. The field has also been used by Tromsø IL for Premier League games. The attendance record is 3,200 people who attended a match between Tromsdalen and Bodø/Glimt in 1992.

Located next to the stadium is an artificial long track speed skating oval also called Tromsdalen Kunstisbane.
