= Grefsen Stadion =

Football stadium

Coordinates: 59°57′33″N 10°46′50″E

Grefsen stadion
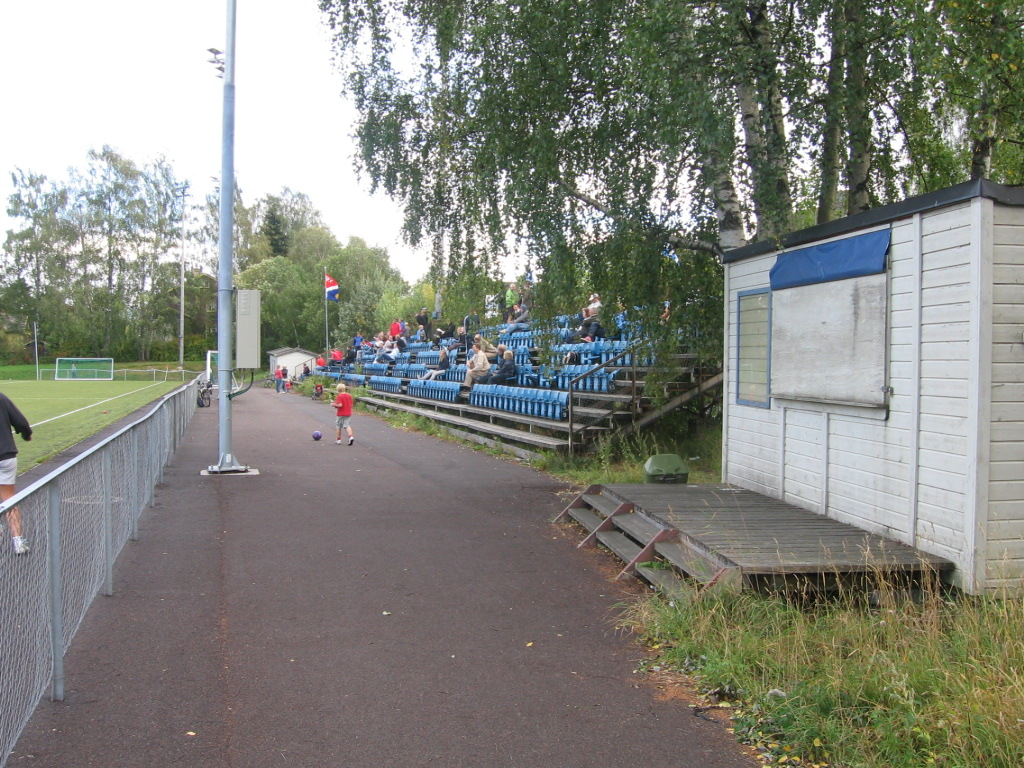
- Grefsen stadion
- Interactive map of Grefsen stadion
- Location: Nordre Aker, Oslo
- Capacity: 1,420 (420 seats)
- Surface: Artificial turf
- Field size: 105m x 64m

Tenant
- Kjelsås Fotball

Grefsen stadion is a football stadium in the Grefsen area of Oslo. It opened in 1930 and is now a training ground for approximately 1,000 children and youth. Currently home of Kjelsås Fotball playing in the Norwegian Second Division. The ground has standing areas on three sides, and one seating area with 420 seats.

The stadium's record attendance is 3,295 for a Norwegian Premier League qualification match in 1998 against Kongsvinger IL, although there exist reports of a Vålerenga - Skeid encounter in 1944 where around 5000 spectators were in attendance.

In 2024, Kjelsås was granted an exemption from the local ban on using rubber granules in artificial turf.

== Photos ==
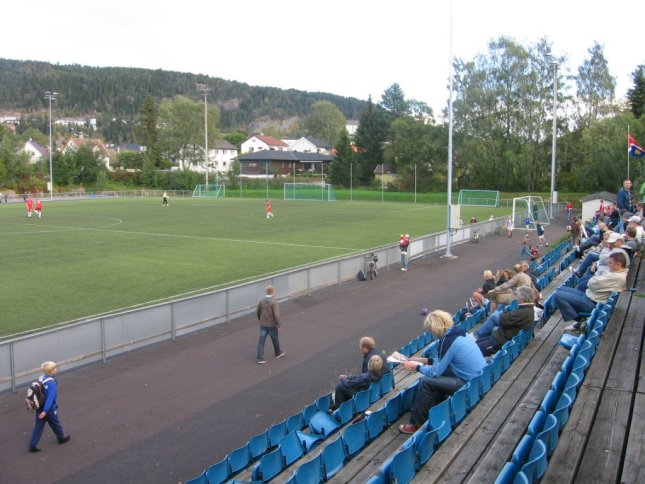
The pitch from the stands

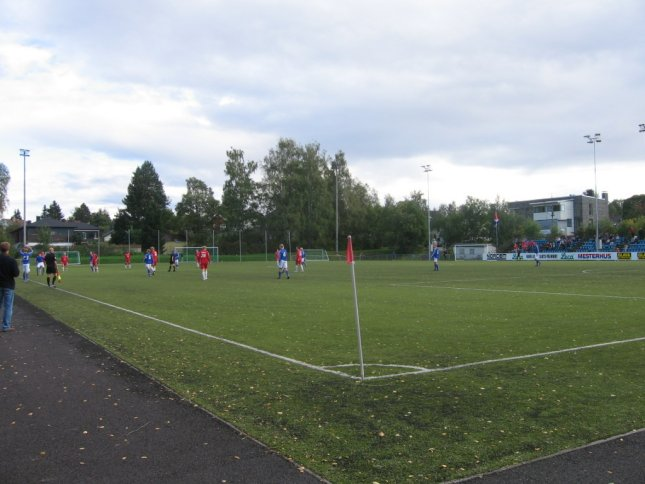
The stadium, looking south

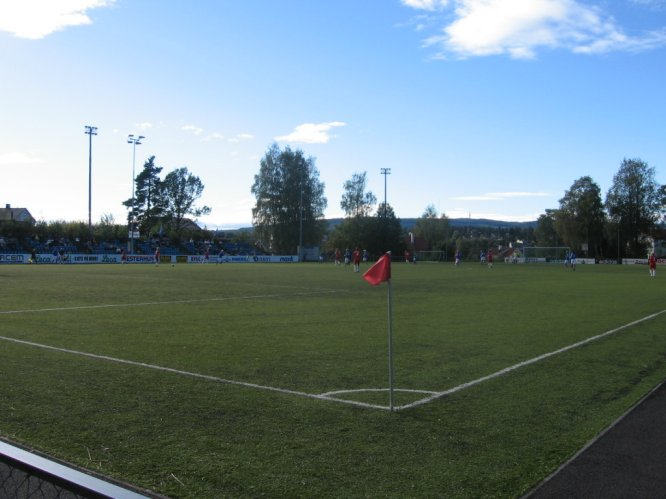
The stadium, looking north

== Transport ==
Grefsen stadion

General information
- Location: Nordre Aker, Oslo; Norway
- Operator: Sporveien Trikken
- Line: Kjelsås Line
- Tracks: Double Track

Other information
- Status: Operating

History
- Original company: Oslo Sporveier
Services
Preceding station	Trams in Oslo	Following station
Grefsenplatået towards Majorstuen	Line 11	Kjelsåsalléen towards Kjelsås
Grefsenplatået towards Majorstuen	Line 12	Kjelsåsalléen towards Kjelsås
Route map
Location

The stadium is served by a nearby tram station on the Kjelsås Line; the station is called Grefsen stadion. It is served by lines 11 and 12.
