= 2026–27 Norwegian Football Cup =

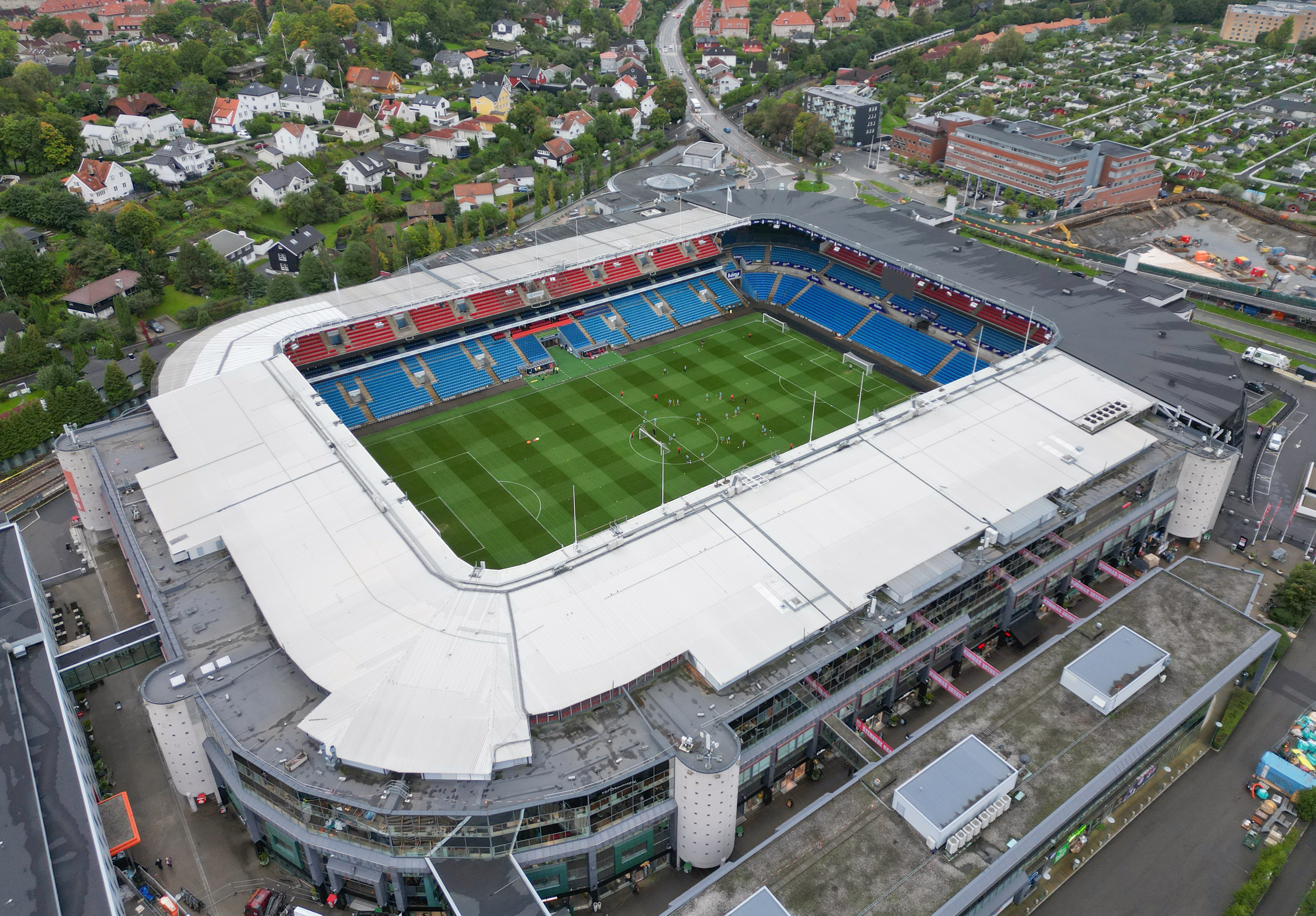
- Ullevaal Stadion will host the final in spring 2027

Tournament details
- Country: Norway
- Dates: 21 August 2026 – 29 May 2027
- Teams: 128

The 2026–27 Norwegian Football Cup is the 121st season of the Norwegian annual knock-out football tournament, and the second season since the competition was switched to an autumn–spring format. It started on 21 August 2026, and will end on 29 May 2027.

The winners of this tournament will enter the 2027–28 UEFA Europa League (exact starting round TBD).

84 teams are directly qualified to the First Round with the remaining 44 teams going through regional qualifiers in their respective regions. The 84 directly qualified teams are all teams from Eliteserien (16 teams), First Division (16 teams), Second Division (28 teams) and the 5 non-reserve teams relegated from 2025 Second Division. The remaining 19 directly qualified teams are from Third Division who finished the 2025 season the strongest, did not achieve promotion to the Second Division and excluding reserve teams.

Starting from this season and onwards, teams from any tier can compete in the qualifying rounds. All of the qualifying matches are arranged by each District Football Association, with each district association having different amount of quota of teams that can qualify for the First Round. After the final qualifying round have been completed, there will be 44 teams left whom will all enter the First Round together with the 84 directly qualified teams.

== Participating clubs ==
The following teams qualified for the competition (tier in brackets):

Eliteserien (1) the 16 clubs of the 2026 season	First Division (2) the 16 clubs of the 2026 season	Second Division (3) the 28 clubs of the 2026 season	Third Division (4) the 5 clubs relegated from Second Division (Note: 6 clubs were relegated, but Brann 2 is a reserve team and thus were ineligible to participate) + the top 19 clubs of the 2025 season
Aalesund; Bodø/Glimt; Brann; Fredrikstad; HamKam; KFUM Oslo; Kristiansund; Lillestrøm; Molde; Rosenborg; Sandefjord; Sarpsborg 08; Start; Tromsø; Vålerenga; Viking	Åsane; Bryne; Egersund; Haugesund; Hødd; Kongsvinger; Lyn; Moss; Odd; Ranheim; Raufoss; Sandnes Ulf; Sogndal; Stabæk; Strømmen; Strømsgodset	Arendal; Bjarg; Brattvåg; Eidsvold Turn; Eik Tønsberg; Follo; Grorud; Hønefoss; Jerv; Junkeren; Kjelsås; Kvik Halden; Levanger; Lørenskog; Lysekloster; Mjøndalen; Notodden; Pors; Rana; Sandviken; Skeid; Sotra; Stjørdals-Blink; Træff; Tromsdalen; Trygg/Lade; Ullensaker/Kisa; Vidar	Alta (relegated); Asker (relegated); Fløy (relegated); Strindheim (relegated); Vard Haugesund (relegated); Bærum; Djerv 1919; Elverum; Fana; Førde; Frigg; Gamle Oslo; Gjøvik-Lyn; Lillehammer; Lokomotiv Oslo; Madla; Melhus; Nordstrand; Ørn Horten; Os; Spjelkavik; Vindbjart; Volda
Representatives of the regional associations 44 representatives of 18 regional associations of the NFF, qualified through regional qualifiers that each respective associations arranged. Tier in brackets
Agder: Flekkefjord (5); Froland (6); Våg (4); Akershus: Aurskog-Finstadbru (5); Eidsvold (5); Buskerud: Åssiden (5); Modum (5); Finnmark: Bossekop (4); Hordaland: Arna-Bjørnar (5); Askøy (4); Frøya (5); Fyllingen (7)	Hålogaland: Harstad (4); Indre Østland: Ridabu (5); Skreia (5); Trysil (5); Nordland: Fauske/Sprint (4); Stålkameratene (5); Nordmøre og Romsdal: Midsund (5); Oslo: Christiania (5); Grei (4); Heming (4); Ready (4)	Rogaland: Brodd (4); Nord (5); Rosseland (5); Varhaug (4); Sogn og Fjordane: Fjøra (5); Florø (5); Sunnmøre: Langevåg (5); Rollon (5); Telemark: Eidanger (5); Urædd (5)	Troms: Fløya (4); Ulfstind (4); Trøndelag: Nationalkameratene (5); Steinkjer (5); Trønder-Lyn (5); Tynset (5); Vestfold: Flint (5); Teie (5); Østfold: Drøbak-Frogn (4); Råde (4); Sparta Sarpsborg (5)

== Calendar ==
Below are the estimated dates for each round as given by the official schedule:

Round	Main date	Number of fixtures	Clubs
First round	22 August 2026	64	128 → 64
Second round	16 September 2026	32	64 → 32
Third round	28 October 2026	16	32 → 16
Fourth round	7 March 2027	8	16 → 8
Quarter-finals	21 April 2027	4	8 → 4
Semi-finals	12 May 2027	2	4 → 2
Final	29 May 2027	1	2 → 1

== First round ==
The pair-ups for the first round were announced on 11 June 2026.

21 August 2026	Stålkameratene (5)	2–3	(3) Rana	Mo i Rana
17:00 CEST (UTC+2)	Rade 32'; Halsen 53'	Report	Olsen 5'; Hagen 35'; Nilsskog 71'	Stadium: Stålhallen; Attendance: 338; Referee: Egil Bertheussen

21 August 2026	Fjøra (5)	0–8	(2) Sogndal	Sogndalsfjøra
18:00 CEST (UTC+2)		Report	Skaanes 36'; Pippola 37', 42'; Hovland 45' (pen.); Helén 69', 73', 87', 90+2'	Stadium: Fosshaugane; Attendance: 750; Referee: Sondre Brudvik

21 August 2026	Urædd (5)	0–3	(3) Pors	Porsgrunn
18:00 CEST (UTC+2)		Report	Bakeng-Rogne 66'; Mauset 85'; Gayi 88'	Stadium: Urædd Kunstgress; Attendance: 465; Referee: Karoline Marie Jensen

21 August 2026	Ridabu (5)	0–4	(2) Raufoss	Ridabu
19:00 CEST (UTC+2)		Report	Karlsen 16', 21'; Agyeman 39'; Onsrud 48'	Stadium: Black River Park; Attendance: 204; Referee: Håvard Bjerkelund

22 August 2026	Asker (4)	7–0	(3) Kvik Halden	Asker
14:00 CEST (UTC+2)	Fredriksen 5', 56'; Fazi 20', 38', 44'; J-E. G. Johansen 27'; Heggset 50'	Report		Stadium: Føyka Stadion; Attendance: 310; Referee: Nedim Brbovic

22 August 2026	Askøy (4)	1–2	(3) Sandviken	Kleppestø
14:00 CEST (UTC+2)	Estifanos 57'	Report	Dalstø 33'; Huesa 64'	Stadium: Follese Tertnes Holding Arena; Attendance: 110; Referee: Bjørn Tore Tvedt

22 August 2026	Frøya (5)	0–6	(3) Sotra	Bergen
14:00 CEST (UTC+2)		Report	Foldnes 9'; Kilen 11', 56'; Ree 25'; Lunde 30'; Falck 45'	Stadium: Frøya Idrettspark; Attendance: 130; Referee: Andrè Frøseth Jønland

22 August 2026	Langevåg (5)	0–13	(1) Aalesund	Langevåg
14:00 CEST (UTC+2)		Report	Andresen 2'; Myrlid 9', 52', 70' (pen.); Nessø 35'; Hammer 43'; Engqvist 45+1'; Kristensen 50'; Syversen 65'; Rønningen 75'; Djantou 77'; Leikanger 81'; Pedersen 82'	Stadium: Langevåg Stadion; Attendance: 1,004; Referee: Torgeir Halsen

22 August 2026	Nordstrand (4)	1–4	(3) Skeid	Oslo
14:00 CEST (UTC+2)	Woldsund 10'	Report	Delaveris 17', 52'; Svenningsen 49'; Ødemarksbakken 81'	Stadium: Hallager kunstgress Attendance: 200; Referee: Jørgen Terland Gundersen

22 August 2026	Spjelkavik (4)	1–2	(2) Hødd	Ålesund
14:00 CEST (UTC+2)	Skulstad 32'	Report	Berisha 17', 49'	Stadium: Spjelkavik stadion Attendance: 220; Referee: Bendik Haarberg

22 August 2026	Lillehammer (4)	2–4 (a.e.t.)	(2) Strømmen	Lillehammer
15:00 CEST (UTC+2)	Nygård 29'; Hammershaug 52'	Report	Kristengård 32', 105'; Ogboji 44'; Nord 109'	Stadium: Stampesletta; Attendance: 250; Referee: Mohammad Hafezi

22 August 2026	Rollon (5)	0–7	(3) Træff	Ålesund
15:00 CEST (UTC+2)		Report	Lewis 18', 59'; Forren 28'; Toven 31'; Løvik 39'; Phudithip 85'; Mork 89'	Stadium: Fjordlaks Arena; Referee: Even Myrheim

22 August 2026	Råde (4)	1–2	(3) Follo	Råde
15:00 CEST (UTC+2)	Bjørnvåg 64'	Report	Fofana 17'; Diallo 57'	Stadium: Råde idrettspark Attendance: 198; Referee: Hakan Catalgøl

22 August 2026	Arna-Bjørnar (5)	0–1	(2) Åsane	Bergen
16:00 CEST (UTC+2)		Report	Haga 82'	Stadium: Arna Idrettspark; Attendance: 285; Referee: Andreas Bjørklund

22 August 2026	Åssiden (5)	0–4	(3) Notodden	Drammen
16:00 CEST (UTC+2)		Report	Leandersson 9', 47', 87', 90'	Stadium: Åssiden stadion Attendance: 300; Referee: Marius Tvede Hansen

22 August 2026	Bossekop (4)	1–2 (a.e.t.)	(4) Alta	Alta
16:00 CEST (UTC+2)	Honka-Hallila 105' (o.g.)	Report	Norbye 96'; Holsbø 98'	Stadium: COOP Arena Kunstgress; Attendance: 1,000; Referee: Brage Nygård

22 August 2026	Bærum (4)	4–0	(3) Mjøndalen	Sandvika
16:00 CEST (UTC+2)	Bransdal 3'; Kaba 40', 54'; Coric 45'	Report		Stadium: AJ Arena; Attendance: 153; Referee: Marit Skurdal Holthe

22 August 2026	Eidsvold (5)	1–7	(1) Fredrikstad	Eidsvoll
16:00 CEST (UTC+2)	Kristiansen 12'	Report	Skogvold 7'; Faraas 22', 84'; Nuñez 40' (pen.); Laghzaoui 56', 64'; Sørløkk 78'	Stadium: Eidsvoll Stadion; Attendance: 460; Referee: Haakon Bue

22 August 2026	Eik Tønsberg (3)	1–4	(3) Hønefoss	Tønsberg
16:00 CEST (UTC+2)	Solli 65'	Report	Øverby 17'; Pozo-Venta 44'; Sawaneh 82'; Pedersen 90+5'	Stadium: Tønsberg Gressbane; Attendance: 400; Referee: Aland Bazaz

22 August 2026	Elverum (4)	7–6 (a.e.t.)	(3) Ullensaker/Kisa	Elverum
16:00 CEST (UTC+2)	Correia 2'; Solum 6'; Enkerud 54', 106'; Aasen 72'; Olsen 90', 105'	Report	Skarpsno 15'; Barane 29', 89', 94'; Bjørnsengen 36'; Solberg 42'	Stadium: Elverum stadion Attendance: 202; Referee: Morten Andersen-Gott

22 August 2026	Fana (4)	1–3	(3) Bjarg	Bergen
16:00 CEST (UTC+2)	Lygre 39'	Report	Eiane 19'; Aasbø 84'; Ahlander 90'	Stadium: Fana Stadion; Attendance: 127; Referee: Ola Kellerhals

22 August 2026	Flekkefjord (5)	1–2	(1) Start	Flekkefjord
16:00 CEST (UTC+2)	Tjørhom 90'	Report	Cornelius 20', 73'	Stadium: Uenes stadion Attendance: 2,360; Referee: Javi Jean-Marc Conny Leo Mertens

22 August 2026	Florø (5)	2–4	(4) Førde	Florø
16:00 CEST (UTC+2)	Tvedt 50' (o.g.); Austreim 54'	Report	Savland 3' (pen.), 90'; Rognebakke 32'; Lorgen 42'	Stadium: Florø stadion Attendance: 454; Referee: Petja Cink

22 August 2026	Fram Larvik (4)	1–2	(3) Jerv	Larvik
16:00 CEST (UTC+2)	Pedersen 69'	Report	Simba 15' (pen.); Kolve 22'	Stadium: Framparken; Attendance: 381; Referee: Batuhan Boyar

22 August 2026	Froland (6)	1–5	(3) Arendal	Froland
16:00 CEST (UTC+2)	Jørgensen 55'	Report	Hurvenes 31'; Helgesen 38', 52'; Nilsen 73'; Kvinge 88'	Stadium: Kringla Stadion; Attendance: 1,100; Referee: Hussain Hamid Al-Kharasani

22 August 2026	Gamle Oslo (4)	6–1	(4) Drøbak-Frogn	Oslo
16:00 CEST (UTC+2)	Natana 9', 62' (pen.); Reinfjord 14'; Tavakoli 22', 38', 45'	Report	Bruksås 90'	Stadium: Vallhall Arena; Attendance: 110; Referee: Sigve Storaunet Sandvik

22 August 2026	Grei (4)	0–4	(2) Lyn	Oslo
16:00 CEST (UTC+2)		Report	M. Johansen 39'; Wilkins 42' (o.g.); Memedov 52'; Sock 82'	Stadium: Greibanen; Attendance: 175; Referee: Himmet Boyar

22 August 2026	Heming (4)	0–2	(2) Stabæk	Oslo
16:00 CEST (UTC+2)		Report	Krogstad 50'; Hanstad 82'	Stadium: Hemingbanen; Attendance: 310; Referee: Eirik Wisted-Thu

22 August 2026	Lokomotiv Oslo (4)	1–5	(3) Grorud	Oslo
16:00 CEST (UTC+2)	Wielens 4'	Report	Alemseged 52'; Haga 69'; Larsen 71'; Kalnæs 84', 90'	Stadium: Frogner stadion Attendance: 110; Referee: Jonah Engh

22 August 2026	Lørenskog (3)	0–3	(2) Moss	Lørenskog
16:00 CEST (UTC+2)		Report	Ogbole 16'; Sørensen 49'; Hermanstad 74'	Stadium: Rolvsrud stadion Attendance: 210; Referee: Johan William Grundt

22 August 2026	Madla (4)	3–2 (a.e.t.)	(3) Vidar	Stavanger
16:00 CEST (UTC+2)	Dessingué 76'; Ekeland 86'; Mairah 101'	Report	Haughom 26', 48'	Stadium: Madla Handelslag Stadion; Referee: Sander Ringøy Moen

22 August 2026	Melhus (4)	0–3	(3) Stjørdals-Blink	Melhus
16:00 CEST (UTC+2)		Report	Kvalvik 49'; Einarson 72'; Maniraguha 90'	Stadium: EiendomsMegler 1 Gruva Aren; Attendance: 300; Referee: Ruben Støfringshaug

22 August 2026	Midsund (5)	0–11	(1) Molde	Midsund
16:00 CEST (UTC+2)		Report	Koné-Doherty 22', 45', 52'; Ødegård 24'; Stølen 31' (o.g.); Bender 42', 90'; Hestad 53', 59', 63', 78'	Stadium: Midsund stadion Attendance: 750; Referee: Oliver Skaret Barsøe

22 August 2026	Nationalkameratene (5)	0–9	(1) Rosenborg	Trondheim
16:00 CEST (UTC+2)		Report	Soboczynski 17'; Witry 33'; Slørdal 53', 57'; E. Ceide 62'; Borgersen 71'; Reitan-Sunde 73', 83'; Sahsah 77'	Stadium: Hallset kunstgress Attendance: 2,704; Referee: Per Oscar Grov Heiberg

22 August 2026	Nord (5)	0–4	(4) Djerv 1919	Haugesund
16:00 CEST (UTC+2)		Report	Hallstensen 24' (pen.); Fjeldstad 77', 78'; Wojtyszyn 87'	Stadium: Nord Stadion; Attendance: 437; Referee: Are Gabriel Høyland

22 August 2026	Os (4)	2–0	(3) Lysekloster	Osøyro
16:00 CEST (UTC+2)	Kjørsvik 39'; Sperrevik 48'	Report		Stadium: Kuventræ Stadion; Attendance: 563; Referee: Freek Arjen van Herk

22 August 2026	Ready (4)	0–4	(1) KFUM Oslo	Oslo
16:00 CEST (UTC+2)		Report	Saunes 16'; Eggen Vinge 25'; Schei 27' (o.g.); Kristensen 45+1'	Stadium: Gressbanen; Attendance: 300; Referee: Anders Bodding

22 August 2026	Skreia (5)	2–14	(2) Kongsvinger	Skreia
16:00 CEST (UTC+2)	Lekaj 36' (pen.), 40'	Report	Christensen 15'; Christiansen 26', 34', 54'; Flores 36', 53'; Lysell 45', 60'; Chaminta 50', 62', 69', 82'; Job 63'; Elmi 70'	Stadium: Skreia Idrettsplass; Attendance: 200; Referee: Markus Rotvold Hammarstrøm

22 August 2026	Steinkjer (5)	0–6	(2) Ranheim	Steinkjer
16:00 CEST (UTC+2)		Report	Solberg 12', 51'; Lundgren 28'; Estilrønningen 37' (o.g.); Haugland 75'; Nyenetue 80'	Stadium: Guldbergaunet Stadion; Attendance: 520; Referee: Markus Lille

22 August 2026	Strindheim (4)	0–8	(3) Levanger	Trondheim
16:00 CEST (UTC+2)		Report	Høiseth 6', 40', 74', 77'; Horten 19', 73'; Sundnes 83'; Beyene 88'	Stadium: Leangen Bolig Arena; Attendance: 200; Referee: Odin Wengstad-Halvorsen

22 August 2026	Teie (5)	0–10	(2) Odd	Nøtterøy
16:00 CEST (UTC+2)		Report	Simenstad 9'; Tewelde 14', 35', 56'; Rasmussen 18', 45+3'; Andersen 40', 45'; Kojo 50'; Kåfoss 58' (o.g.)	Stadium: Teie Xpert idrettspark Attendance: 700; Referee: Pavel Breivik

22 August 2026	Trønder-Lyn (5)	0–5	(1) Kristiansund	Kvål
16:00 CEST (UTC+2)		Report	Alvheim 17', 51', 79'; Bruseth 41', 77'	Stadium: Sørøya kunstkress Attendance: 437; Referee: Preben Øien

22 August 2026	Tynset (5)	0–3	(3) Trygg/Lade	Tynset
16:00 CEST (UTC+2)		Report	Vollan 24', 53'; Flottorp 85'	Stadium: Nytrømoen; Attendance: 167; Referee: Espen Tømmervold

22 August 2026	Ulfstind (4)	0–5	(1) Tromsø	Tromsø
16:00 CEST (UTC+2)		Report	Evensen-Jensen 13', 41'; Innvær 25', 36'; Hien 86'	Stadium: Tønsnes kunstgressbane Attendance: 380; Referee: Magnus Henriksen Tjelle

22 August 2026	Vard Haugesund (4)	3–4 (a.e.t.)	(2) Haugesund	Haugesund
16:00 CEST (UTC+2)	Eide 2'; Lille-Løve 56', 90' (pen.)	Report	Grindhaug 29'; Sandberg 59'; Diarra 80'; Seone 97'	Stadium: Haugesund Stadion; Attendance: 1,000; Referee: Amir Ajjour

22 August 2026	Vindbjart (4)	2–1	(4) Fløy	Vennesla
16:00 CEST (UTC+2)	Hoel 18'; Gummedal 43'	Report	Knutsen 90'	Stadium: Sparebanken Norge-banen Vennesla; Attendance: 389; Referee: Diar Omar Masti

22 August 2026	Volda (4)	2–6	(3) Brattvåg	Volda
16:00 CEST (UTC+2)	Aambø 45'; Viddal 82'	Report	Tveiten 24', 56'; Havig 29', 52'; Myers 42'; Myklebust 78'	Stadium: Sparebank 1 Bana; Attendance: 309; Referee: Daniel Refsnes

22 August 2026	Våg (4)	2–5	(2) Egersund	Kristiansand
16:00 CEST (UTC+2)	Wahlstrøm 45' (pen.), 77' (pen.)	Report	Lynum 7'; Harðarson 34'; Eggen 63'; Sleveland 78'	Stadium: Karuss; Referee: Jørgen Haga

22 August 2026	Frigg (4)	0–4	(3) Kjelsås	Oslo
18:00 CEST (UTC+2)		Report	Petros 4'; Rekdal 14'; Hanstad 32'; Askengren 65'	Stadium: Tørteberg kunstgress Attendance: 168; Referee: Martin Myklebust

22 August 2026	Gjøvik/Lyn (4)	2–7 (a.e.t.)	(3) Eidsvold Turn	Gjøvik
18:00 CEST (UTC+2)	Korsaksel 70'; Fjellestad 87'	Report	Bolsø 12', 104'; Mulaj 37'; Da Silva 94', 118'; Ruud 107'; Bandeh 116'	Stadium: Gjøvik Stadion; Attendance: 100; Referee: Jonas Weiberg Sture

22 August 2026	Harstad (4)	0–1	(3) Tromsdalen	Harstad
18:00 CEST (UTC+2)		Report	Halvorsen 24'	Stadium: Harstad Stadion; Referee: Gustav Havig

22 August 2026	Sparta Sarpsborg (5)	0–2	(1) Sarpsborg 08	Sarpsborg
18:00 CEST (UTC+2)		Report	Halvorsen 31'; Utvik 51'	Stadium: Spartabanen; Referee: Abdulhadi Al-Fahad

23 August 2026	Christiania (5)	2–7	(1) Vålerenga	Oslo
15:00 CEST (UTC+2)	Labib 70'; Sereba 87' (pen.)	Report	Haren 2'; Sæter 3', 32'; Jatta 20'; Kiil Olsen 54'; Rajkovic 78'; Meliga 80'	Stadium: Jordal Idrettspark; Attendance: 2,676; Referee: Stian Røvig Sletner

23 August 2026	Fløya (4)	5–3	(3) Junkeren	Tromsø
15:00 CEST (UTC+2)	Bogdan 10' (pen.); Whalen 17'; Celius 39'; Egerton 67'; Fitzgerald 83'	Report	Moyo 54' (pen.); Solhaug 89'; Unhjem 90'	Stadium: Fløya Arena; Attendance: 350; Referee: Michael Wikestad Pedersen

23 August 2026	Trysil (5)	0–5	(1) HamKam	Innbygda
15:00 CEST (UTC+2)		Report	Isufi 28'; Opsahl 31'; Gjone 45+1'; Alexandersson 70'; Osnes-Ringen 86'	Stadium: Trysil idrettsplass Attendance: 1,137; Referee: Ali al Hatem

23 August 2026	Eidanger (5)	0–15	(1) Sandefjord	Porsgrunn
16:00 CEST (UTC+2)		Report	Berntsen 4', 46'; Mathisen 22' (pen.), 43', 52', 61', 68' (pen.); Hellan 35'; Apetorgbor 74', 85', 90+3'; Vester 79', 90+1'; Dunsby 86'; Pedersen 90'	Stadium: Eidangerbanen; Attendance: 650; Referee: Ole-Alexander Ekeli Valen

23 August 2026	Modum (5)	0–6	(2) Strømsgodset	Geithus
16:00 CEST (UTC+2)		Report	Heredia-Randen 4'; Krasniqi 21'; Melkersen 39', 42', 45'; Silalahi 89'	Stadium: Rolighetsmoen; Attendance: 1,528; Referee: Herman Leiulfsrud Aass

23 August 2026	Flint (5)	2–0	(4) Ørn Horten	Tønsberg
17:00 CEST (UTC+2)	Ibrahim 25'; Abdullahu 50'	Report		Stadium: Flint Esso Arena; Attendance: 634; Referee: Vetle Haugene

23 August 2026	Fyllingen (7)	0–4	(1) Brann	Bergen
17:00 CEST (UTC+2)		Report	Eriksen 3'; Castro 13'; Finne 90+4'; Lægreid 90+7'	Stadium: Varden Amfi; Attendance: 2,922; Referee: Andreas Flückiger

26 August 2026	Fauske/Sprint (4)	0–5	(1) Bodø/Glimt	Fauske
18:00 CEST (UTC+2)		Report	Brynhildsen 12' (pen.), 54'; Mvuka 23'; Bangfil 40' (o.g.); Bassi 60'	Stadium: Fauske Kunstgress; Referee: Even Andreas Richter Eliassen

26 August 2026	Rosseland (5)	0–3	(2) Bryne	Bryne
18:00 CEST (UTC+2)		Report	Strunck 58'; Sødal 75'; Qvigstad 88'	Stadium: Rosselandsbanen; Referee: Jørgen Haga

26 August 2026	Varhaug (4)	2–3	(2) Sandnes Ulf	Varhaug
18:00 CEST (UTC+2)	Shatri 25'; Dalbye 30'	Report	Memed 5'; Nyhagen 66'; Aune 75'	Stadium: AH BYGG banen Attendance: 478; Referee: Brage Nygård

2 September 2026	Aurskog-Finstadbru (5)	0–3	(1) Lillestrøm	Aursmoen
18:00 CEST (UTC+2)		Report	Fadil 11'; Nyheim 15'; Nordh 89'	Stadium: Aursmoen kunstgress Attendance: 1,840; Referee: Haakon Bue

2 September 2026	Brodd (4)	1–3	(1) Viking	Stavanger
18:00 CEST (UTC+2)	Taraldset 36'	Report	Hansen 50', 54'; Haugen 69'	Stadium: Midjord idrettspark Attendance: 2,624; Referee: Aleksander Vermundsen

== Second round ==
The pair-ups for the second round were announced on 31 August 2026. However, due to the death of King Harald V of Norway, majority of games this round has been postponed by one week and some games further postponed due to participation in European club football.

Some of the teams got to the second round, by beating teams in a higher division. Those winning teams include Asker, Bærum, Elverum, Madla, Os, Fløya, and Flint.

8 September 2026	Tromsdalen (3)	9–1	(2) Strømmen	Tromsø
18:00 CEST (UTC+2)	Selnes 7'; Eliassen 11'; Adolfsen 31'; T. Hafstad 39'; Ness 45+1'; Bådsvik 46'; D. Hafstad 74', 79', 82'	Report	Abdulla 80'	Stadium: TUIL Arena; Attendance: 211; Referee: Johan William Grundt

8 September 2026	Djerv 1919 (4)	0–4	(2) Haugesund	Haugesund
18:00 CEST (UTC+2)		Report	Grindhaug 12'; Hope 16'; Sandberg 74'; Jakobsen 84'	Stadium: Djervbanen; Referee: Aleksander Vermundsen

8 September 2026	Asker (4)	1–4	(2) Strømsgodset	Asker
19:00 CEST (UTC+2)	Fazi 48'	Report	Ingebrethsen 27'; Ardraa 30'; Mehnert 38'; Hejer 74' (o.g.)	Stadium: Føyka Stadion; Attendance: 1,302; Referee: Anders Bodding

16 September 2026	Førde (4)	3–4 (a.e.t.)	(1) Aalesund	Førde
17:00 CEST (UTC+2)	Lorgen 7' (pen.), 11'; Gjelsvik 105+2'	Report	Myrlid 89', 111'; Hagen 90+1'; Djantou 95'	Stadium: Førde Stadion; Referee: Steinar Hauge

16 September 2026	Alta (4)	1–2	(1) Tromsø	Alta
18:00 CEST (UTC+2)	Holsbø 11'	Report	Larsen 35'; Erlien 88'	Stadium: Finnmarkshallen; Referee: Herman Holthe

16 September 2026	Arendal (3)	1–2	(2) Sandnes Ulf	Arendal
18:00 CEST (UTC+2)	Suggelia 90+2'	Report	Sundberg 7'; Nyhagen 78'	Stadium: Bjønnes stadion Attendance: 250; Referee: Herman Leiulfsrud Aass

16 September 2026	Bjarg (3)	1–4	(2) Bryne	Bergen
18:00 CEST (UTC+2)	Alzubi 78'	Report	Sødal 66'; Jóhannsson 68'; Håland 76'; Voll 84'	Stadium: Stavollen Kunstgress; Referee: Andreas Bjørklund

16 September 2026	Brattvåg (3)	1–2	(1) Kristiansund	Brattvåg
18:00 CEST (UTC+2)	Tveiten 5' (pen.)	Report	Christensen 30'; Isaksen 90+1'	Stadium: Brattvåg gras Referee: Daniel Refsnes

16 September 2026	Elverum (4)	0–3	(2) Raufoss	Elverum
18:00 CEST (UTC+2)		Report	Fremstad 6'; Korsaksel 55'; Åsvestad 57'	Stadium: Elverum stadion Attendance: 340; Referee: Eirik Wisted-Thu

16 September 2026	Fløya (4)	1–4	(1) Rosenborg	Tromsø
18:00 CEST (UTC+2)	Marblow 45'	Report	Witry 76' (pen.); Bomholt 87'; Ceïde 90', 90+4'	Stadium: Fløya Arena; Referee: Egil Bertheussen

16 September 2026	Gamle Oslo (4)	1–3	(2) Lyn	Oslo
18:00 CEST (UTC+2)	Løvlund 26'	Report	Hellum 10', 20'; Memedov 44'	Stadium: Bjølsen kunstgress Referee: Ole-Alexander Ekeli Valen

16 September 2026	Jerv (3)	1–2	(2) Egersund	Grimstad
18:00 CEST (UTC+2)	Simba 1'	Report	Harðarson 3', 17'	Stadium: J.J. Ugland Stadion – Levermyr; Attendance: 567; Referee: Hussain Hamid Al-Kharasani

16 September 2026	Kjelsås (3)	0–2	(1) HamKam	Oslo
18:00 CEST (UTC+2)		Report	Strand-Nilsen 45+3'; Mettler 80'	Stadium: Grefsen Stadion; Attendance: 870; Referee: Magnus Nicolai Koløy

16 September 2026	Levanger (3)	0–2	(2) Ranheim	Levanger
18:00 CEST (UTC+2)		Report	Nyenetue 11'; Rolstad 52'	Stadium: Moan Fritidspark; Referee: Markus Lille

16 September 2026	Notodden (3)	2–3	(2) Odd	Notodden
18:00 CEST (UTC+2)	Bjerkan 12'; Nordbø 52'	Report	Aas 23'; Söderberg 50'; Andersen 73'	Stadium: Idrettsparken; Referee: Abdulhadi Al-Fahad

16 September 2026	Os (4)	1–2	(1) Brann	Osøyro
18:00 CEST (UTC+2)	Vindenes 39'	Report	Ingason 89' (pen.); Magnússon 90+1'	Stadium: Kuventræ Stadion; Attendance: 2,376; Referee: Ola Kellerhals

16 September 2026	Pors (3)	2–1 (a.e.t.)	(2) Stabæk	Porsgrunn
18:00 CEST (UTC+2)	Østby 90+2'; Johnsen 93'	Report	Lie 86'	Stadium: Pors Stadion; Referee: Marius Lien

16 September 2026	Sandviken (3)	2–2 (a.e.t.) (4–5 p)	(2) Åsane	Bergen
18:00 CEST (UTC+2)	Mvuka 29' (pen.); Høynes 71'	Report	Ramsay 19'; Sundsøy 56'	Stadium: Stemmemyren idrettsplass Referee: Andreas Flückiger
	Penalties
	Høynes (penalty scored); Aasen (penalty scored); Mvuka (penalty missed); Tune (penalty scored); Dalstø (penalty scored)		(penalty scored) Haga; (penalty scored) Furebotn; (penalty scored) Telle; (penalty scored) Lie; (penalty scored) Aaker-Saldanha

16 September 2026	Sotra (3)	1–1 (a.e.t.) (3–5 p)	(2) Sogndal	Straume
18:00 CEST (UTC+2)	Håland 50'	Report	Gausdal 8'	Stadium: Straume Idrettspark; Attendance: 467; Referee: Amir Ajjour
	Penalties
	Kilen (penalty scored); Hjorteseth (penalty scored); Ree (penalty scored); Jonassen (penalty missed)		(penalty scored) Hovland; (penalty scored) Vapne; (penalty scored) Flo; (penalty scored) Helén; (penalty scored) Pippola

16 September 2026	Stjørdals-Blink (3)	0–1	(1) Fredrikstad	Stjørdalshalsen
18:00 CEST (UTC+2)		Report	Nuñez 83'	Stadium: TMT Stadion Sandskogan; Attendance: 390; Referee: Per Oscar Grov Heiberg

16 September 2026	Træff (3)	0–3	(2) Hødd	Molde
18:00 CEST (UTC+2)		Report	Kaarsbo 6'; Håheim-Elveseter 41'; Rawufu 79'	Stadium: Reknesbanen; Attendance: 150; Referee: Oliver Skaret Barsøe

16 September 2026	Trygg/Lade (3)	0–5	(1) Molde	Trondheim
18:00 CEST (UTC+2)		Report	Sery 24', 83'; Granaas 55'; Abdullai 56', 79'	Stadium: Obosbanen; Attendance: 530; Referee: Preben Øien

16 September 2026	Vindbjart (4)	2–3	(1) Start	Vennesla
18:00 CEST (UTC+2)	Heggland 36'; Svela 50'	Report	Meyer 30'; Dashaev 56'; Koutsakos 78' (pen.)	Stadium: Sparebanken Norge-banen Vennesla; Attendance: 2,012; Referee: Jørgen Haga

16 September 2026	Eidsvold Turn (3)	2–3	(2) Kongsvinger	Eidsvoll
19:00 CEST (UTC+2)	Ruud 28' (pen.); Bolsø 63'	Report	Chaminta 18', 54'; Johnson 40'	Stadium: Myhrer stadion Referee: Stian Røvig Sletner

17 September 2026	Skeid (3)	1–4	(1) Vålerenga	Oslo
18:00 CEST (UTC+2)	Ødemarksbakken 86'	Report	Strand 13'; Näsberg 49'; Rajkovic 54'; Haren 76'	Stadium: Nordre Åsen Stadion; Attendance: 1,248; Referee: Haakon Bue

23 September 2026	Grorud (3)	1–1 (a.e.t.) (6–5 p)	(2) Moss	Oslo
18:00 CEST (UTC+2)	Rasen 20'	Report	Semmen 53' (pen.)	Stadium: Grorud matchbane Attendance: 349; Referee: Mohammad Usman Aslam
	Penalties
	Jatta (penalty scored); Silfver-Ramage (penalty scored); Silalahi (penalty scored); Bjeglerud (penalty scored); Rasen (penalty scored); Mraković (penalty scored)		(penalty scored) Aga; (penalty scored) Alexandersson; (penalty scored) Eriksen; (penalty scored) Andersen; (penalty scored) Usman; (penalty missed) Ibsen

30 September 2026	Flint (5)	0–1	(1) Sandefjord	Tønsberg
18:00 CEST (UTC+2)		Report	Mathisen 54'	Stadium: Flint Esso Arena; Referee: Mohammad Hafezi

30 September 2026	Follo (3)	0–2	(1) Sarpsborg 08	Ski
18:00 CEST (UTC+2)		Report	Karlsbakk 40'; Sørli 76'	Stadium: Ski Stadion; Attendance: 490; Referee: Harald Vollstad Sletner

30 September 2026	Hønefoss (3)	0–2	(1) KFUM Oslo	Hønefoss
18:00 CEST (UTC+2)		Report	Tobiassen 45'; Visted 50'	Stadium: Aka Arena; Attendance: 896; Referee: [Ali al Hatem

1 October 2026	Bærum (4)	1–5	(1) Lillestrøm	Sandvika
18:00 CEST (UTC+2)	Dacic 84'	Report	Moen Foss 16'; Nyheim 44'; Vá 67'; Ottesen 69'; Paintsil 75'	Stadium: AJ Arena; Attendance: 618; Referee: Ajdin Medic

1 October 2026	Madla (4)	0–3	(1) Viking	Stavanger
18:00 CEST (UTC+2)		Report	Tripić 47'; Christiansen 50', 82'	Stadium: Madla Handelslag stadion Attendance: 2,447; Referee: Amir Ajjour

1 October 2026	Rana (3)	2–6	(1) Bodø/Glimt	Mo i Rana
18:00 CEST (UTC+2)	Frøysa 15'; Aas 25'	Report	Fet 40'; Thuv 45' (o.g.); Mvuka 50', 67'; Kitolano 57' (pen.); Brynhildsen 84'	Stadium: Sagbakken Stadion; Attendance: 2,514; Referee: Martin Berg

== Third round ==
The pair-ups for the third round were announced on 17 September 2026.

6 October 2026	Raufoss (2)	1–5	(1) Start	Raufoss
17:00 CET (UTC+1)	Zekhnini 12' (pen.)	Report	Ugland 15'; Cornelius 21', 30'; Dahl Reitan 70'; Schulze 78'	Stadium: Nammo Stadion; Attendance: 382; Referee: Mischa Kellerhals

28 October 2026	Tromsdalen (3)	1–3	(2) Lyn	Tromsø
17:00 CET (UTC+1)	Halvorsen 74'	Report	M. Johansen 29'; Bjørntvedt Olsen 45' (pen.); Sock 90+4'	Stadium: TUIL Arena; Attendance: 237; Referee: Ali Al Hatem

28 October 2026	Åsane (2)	3–0	(2) Hødd	Bergen
18:00 CET (UTC+1)	Rossi 52', 66'; Brudvik 90+5' (pen.)	Report		Stadium: Åsane Arena; Attendance: 193; Referee: Magnus Koløy

28 October 2026	Egersund (2)	1–0	(2) Bryne	Egersund
18:00 CET (UTC+1)	Gyamfi 27'	Report		Stadium: B&G Parken; Attendance: 712; Referee: Steinar Hauge

28 October 2026	Grorud (3)	0–2	(1) Brann	Oslo
18:00 CET (UTC+1)		Report	Ingason 66'; Castro 72'	Stadium: Grorud matchbane Attendance: 1,148; Referee: Mathias Støfringshaug

28 October 2026	Kristiansund (1)	0–2	(1) Aalesund	Kristiansund
18:00 CET (UTC+1)		Report	Vecchia 37'; Charles 49'	Stadium: Kristiansund Stadion; Attendance: 969; Referee: Jørgen Haugen

28 October 2026	Lillestrøm (1)	2–1	(2) Sogndal	Lillestrøm
18:00 CET (UTC+1)	Melland 66'; Gulbrandsen 76'	Report	Arierhi 75' (pen.)	Stadium: Åråsen Stadion; Attendance: 2,622; Referee: Marius Lien

28 October 2026	Molde (1)	4–1	(2) Strømsgodset	Molde
18:00 CET (UTC+1)	Koné-Doherty 10'; Abdullai 42'; Ødegård 89', 90+5'	Report	Dedes 20'	Stadium: Aker Stadion; Attendance: 2,265; Referee: Sigurd Kringstad

28 October 2026	Odd (2)	3–1	(1) Sandefjord	Skien
18:00 CET (UTC+1)	Ambrose 18'; Rasmussen 29'; Tewelde 51'	Report	Berntsen 86'	Stadium: Skagerak Arena; Attendance: 3,267; Referee: Ola Hobber Nilsen

28 October 2026	Pors (3)	3–1 (a.e.t.)	(2) Kongsvinger	Porsgrunn
18:00 CET (UTC+1)	Gayi 23'; Lewis 102'; Lindvig 109'	Report	Olawore 57'	Stadium: Pors Stadion; Attendance: 721; Referee: Javi Jean-Marc Conny Leo Mertens

28 October 2026	Ranheim (2)	2–5	(1) Fredrikstad	Trondheim
18:00 CET (UTC+1)	Holden 15'; Solberg 86'	Report	Faraas 9'; Eid 20'; Faraas 52'; Skogvold 54'; Wesseh 89'	Stadium: EXTRA Arena; Attendance: 508; Referee: Stian Røvig Sletner

28 October 2026	Rosenborg (1)	1–2	(1) HamKam	Trondheim
18:00 CET (UTC+1)	Ceide 39'	Report	Benjamin 72'; Jónsson 84'	Stadium: Lerkendal Stadion; Attendance: 6,452; Referee: Tore Hansen

28 October 2026	Sarpsborg 08 (1)	3–2	(1) Vålerenga	Sarpsborg
18:00 CET (UTC+1)	Mmaee 11', 49'; Karlsbakk 69'	Report	Gjengaar 59', 65'	Stadium: Sarpsborg Stadion; Referee: Mohammad Usman Aslam

28 October 2026	Tromsø (1)	3–2	(2) Haugesund	Tromsø
19:00 CET (UTC+1)	Hien 7', 34'; Jenssen 90+4'	Report	Grindhaug 74'; Schifferl 90+2'	Stadium: Romssa Arena; Attendance: 1,432; Referee: Mohammad Hafezi

28 February 2027	Viking (1)	v	(1) KFUM Oslo	Stavanger
--:-- CET (UTC+1)		Report		Stadium: Viking Stadion

28 February 2027	Sandnes Ulf (2)	v	(1) Bodø/Glimt	Sandnes
--:-- CET (UTC+1)		Report		Stadium: Øster Hus Arena

== Fourth round ==
The pair-ups for the fourth round were announced on 28 October 2026.

7 March 2027	Lillestrøm (1)	v	(1) Viking / (1) KFUM Oslo	Lillestrøm
--:-- CET (UTC+1)				Stadium: Åråsen Stadion

7 March 2027	Molde (1)	v	(2) Odd	Molde
--:-- CET (UTC+1)				Stadium: Aker Stadion

7 March 2027	Pors (3)	v	(1) Fredrikstad	Porsgrunn
--:-- CET (UTC+1)				Stadium: Pors Stadion

7 March 2027	Åsane (2)	v	(1) Bodø/Glimt / (2) Sandnes Ulf	Bergen
--:-- CET (UTC+1)				Stadium: Åsane Arena

7 March 2027	HamKam (1)	v	(1) Aalesund	Hamar
--:-- CET (UTC+1)				Stadium: Briskeby Stadion

7 March 2027	Brann (1)	v	(2) Egersund	Bergen
--:-- CET (UTC+1)				Stadium: Brann Stadion

7 March 2027	Sarpsborg 08 (1)	v	(1) Start	Sarpsborg
--:-- CET (UTC+1)				Stadium: Sarpsborg Stadion

7 March 2027	Lyn (2)	v	(1) Tromsø	Oslo
--:-- CET (UTC+1)				Stadium: Bislett Stadion

== Quarter-finals ==
The draw of pair-ups for the quarter-finals are TBA.

== Semi-finals ==
The draw of pair-ups for the semi-finals are TBA.

== Final ==
The final will played on 29 May 2027. 2027 Norwegian Football Cup final

== Top scorers ==
Rank	Player	Club	Goals
