= 2026 Åsane Fotball season =

Åsane
2026 season
- Chairman: Espen D. Brochmann
- Manager: Eirik Bakke
- Stadium: Åsane Arena
- 1. divisjon: 14th
- 2026–27 Norwegian Cup: First round
Home colours	Away colours

The 2026 season is the Åsane's season in 1. divisjon, the second tier of Norwegian football. The club is managed by Eirik Bakke and plays its home matches at Åsane Arena in Bergen. Åsane also competes in the 2026–27 Norwegian Cup.

== Transfers ==
=== In ===
Pos.	Player	Transferred from	Fee	Date	Source
DF	(Romania) Filip Oprea	(Norway) Tromsø IL		12 February 2026	
DF	(Senegal) Hassou Diaby	(Faroe Islands) NSÍ Runavík		27 February 2026	
FW	(Italy) Leonardo Rossi	(Norway) Moss FK		31 March 2026	

=== Out ===
Pos.	Player	Transferred to	Fee	Date	Source
DF	(Norway) Mathias Øren	(Norway) Sogndal	Loan return	31 December 2025	

== Pre-season and friendlies ==
30 January 2026	Åsane	4–1	Sandviken

6 February 2026	Åsane	1–2	Bryne

18 February 2026	Åsane	3–3	Lysekloster

26 February 2026	Åsane	1–3	Bjarg

21 March 2026	Åsane	0–1	Hødd

29 March 2026	Sogndal	1–1	Åsane

== Competitions ==
=== Overall record ===
Competition	First match	Last match	Starting round	Record							
Competition	First match	Last match	Starting round	Pld	W	D	L	GF	GA	GD	Win %
Norwegian First Division	6 April 2026		Matchday 1	12	3	1	8	15	24	−9	25.00
2026–27 Norwegian Football Cup				0	0	0	0	0	0	+0	—
Total				12	3	1	8	15	24	−9	25.00

Source: Competitions

=== Norwegian First Division ===
Pos	Team	Pld	W	D	L	GF	GA	GD	Pts	Promotion, qualification or relegation
12	Sogndal	12	3	3	6	20	29	−9	12	
13	Raufoss	12	3	1	8	16	28	−12	10	
14	Lyn	12	3	1	8	10	24	−14	10	Qualification for the relegation play-offs
15	Åsane	12	3	1	8	15	24	−9	9 (Note: Åsane deducted 1 point due to late submission of financial reporting package.)	Relegation to Second Division
16	Strømmen	12	2	2	8	15	33	−18	8	Relegation to Second Division

Updated to match(es) played on 21 June 2026. Source: OBOS-ligaen (in Norwegian)
Rules for classification: 1) Points; 2) Goal difference; 3) Goals scored; 4) Head-to-head points; 5) Head-to-head goal difference; 6) Head-to-head goals scored.

==== Results summary ====
Overall								Home						Away					
Pld	W	D	L	GF	GA	GD	Pts	W	D	L	GF	GA	GD	W	D	L	GF	GA	GD
0	0	0	0	0	0	0	0	0	0	0	0	0	0	0	0	0	0	0	0

==== Results by round ====
Round	1	2	3	4	5	6	7	8	9
Ground	H	A	H	A	A	H	A	H	H
Result	L	L	L	L	L	L	D	W	W
Position									

A = Away; H = Home; W = Win; D = Draw; L = Loss

==== Matches ====
The match schedule was issued on 19 December 2025.

6 April 2026 1	Åsane	2–3	Moss

12 April 2026 2	Stabæk	4–0	Åsane

19 April 2026 3	Åsane	4–5	Strømmen

25 April 2026 4	Sogndal	2–0	Åsane

1 May 2026 5	Hødd	1–0	Åsane

10 May 2026 6	Åsane	0–3	Strømsgodset

16 May 2026 7	Haugesund	1–1	Åsane

20 May 2026 8	Åsane	2–0	Sandnes Ulf

25 May 2026 9	Åsane	3–0	Raufoss

14 June 2026 11	Åsane	2–1	Odd	Bergen
16:00				Stadium: Åsane Arena

21 June 2026 12	Bryne	1–0	Åsane	Bryne
16:00				Stadium: Bryne Stadion

2 July 2026 14	Lyn	6–2	Åsane
18:00

=== Norwegian Football Cup ===
22–23 August 2026 First round	Arna-Bjørnar	v	Åsane
