= 2026 Kongsvinger IL Toppfotball season =

Kongsvinger
2026 season
- Chairman: Jon Inge Høiland
- Manager: Johan Wennberg
- Stadium: Gjemselund Stadion
- 1. divisjon: 2nd
- 2026–27 Norwegian Cup: Pre-season
Home colours	Away colours

The 2026 season is the 134th season in the history of Kongsvinger IL Toppfotball and the fifth consecutive season in the Norwegian First Division. In addition, the club will participate in the 2026–27 Norwegian Football Cup.

== Transfers ==
=== In ===
Pos.	Player	Transferred from	Fee	Date	Source
DF	(Norway) Adrian Aleksander Hansen	(Norway) Raufoss IL		9 January 2026	
DF	(Eritrea) Victor Fors	(Norway) Raufoss IL		9 January 2026	
FW	(Sweden) Gabriel Johnson	(Sweden) Hässleholms IF	Undisclosed	30 January 2026	
MF	(Norway) Leon Juberg-Hovland	(Norway) Molde FK		30 January 2026	
DF	(Norway) Herman Udnæs	(Norway) Eidsvold Turn Fotball		3 February 2026	
MF	(Nigeria) Daniel Job	(Norway) Sarpsborg 08		6 February 2026	
GK	(Norway) William Da Rocha	(Norway) KFUM Oslo		10 February 2026	
FW	(Norway) Mads Sande	(Norway) SK Brann		25 March 2026	

=== Out ===
Pos.	Player	Transferred to	Fee	Date	Source
FW	(Norway) Martin Tangen Vinjor	(Norway) KFUM Oslo	End of contract	2 December 2025	
FW	(Denmark) Lucas Haren	(Norway) Vålerenga	End of contract	3 December 2025	
MF	(Norway) Jesper Andreas Grundt	(Norway) Tromsø IL	Undisclosed	28 December 2025	
GK	(Sweden) August Strömberg		End of contract	1 January 2026	
MF	(Norway) Harald Holter	(Denmark) FC Roskilde	End of contract	1 January 2026	
DF	(Norway) Fredrik Holmé	(Norway) Fredrikstad FK	Undisclosed	23 January 2026	
DF	(Sweden) Joel Nilsson	(Sweden) Halmstads BK	End of contract	29 January 2026	
FW	(Sweden) Noa Williams	(Norway) Sarpsborg 08	Undisclosed	6 February 2026	
FW	(Norway) Joacim Holtan	(Iceland) Afturelding		20 March 2026	

== Pre-season and friendlies ==
6 February 2026	Kongsvinger (Norway)	0–2	(Norway) HamKam

13 February 2026	KFUM Oslo (Norway)	1–1	(Norway) Kongsvinger

21 February 2026	Haugesund (Norway)	1–2	(Norway) Kongsvinger

24 February 2026	Kongsvinger (Norway)	4–2	(Norway) Lillestrøm

7 March 2026	Kongsvinger (Norway)	2–1	(Norway) Lyn

14 March 2026	Kongsvinger (Norway)	1–3	(Norway) Strømmen

18 March 2026	Kongsvinger (Norway)	2–1	(Norway) Grorud

21 March 2026	Stabæk (Norway)	2–3	(Norway) Kongsvinger

29 March 2026	Hammarby IF (Sweden)	3–3	(Norway) Kongsvinger

18 November 2026	Marbella FC (Spain)	v	(Norway) Kongsvinger	Marbella, Spain
16:00

== Competitions ==
=== First Division ===
Pos	Team	Pld	W	D	L	GF	GA	GD	Pts	Promotion, qualification or relegation
1	Strømsgodset (C, P)	30	20	6	4	82	36	+46	66	Promotion to Eliteserien
2	Haugesund (P)	30	21	2	7	86	51	+35	65	Promotion to Eliteserien
3	Kongsvinger	30	18	5	7	84	50	+34	59	Qualification for the promotion play-offs third round
4	Stabæk	30	18	4	8	70	38	+32	58	Qualification for the promotion play-offs second round
5	Odd	30	14	7	9	60	48	+12	49	Qualification for the promotion play-offs first round

Updated to match(es) played on 8 November 2026. Source: OBOS-ligaen (in Norwegian)
Rules for classification: 1) Points; 2) Goal difference; 3) Goals scored; 4) Head-to-head points; 5) Head-to-head goal difference; 6) Head-to-head goals scored.
(C) Champions; (P) Promoted

==== Results summary ====
Overall								Home						Away					
Pld	W	D	L	GF	GA	GD	Pts	W	D	L	GF	GA	GD	W	D	L	GF	GA	GD
23	15	5	3	68	35	+33	50	9	2	1	45	21	+24	6	3	2	23	14	+9

Last updated: 20 September 2026.
Source: worldfootball

==== Results by round ====
Round	1	2	3	4	5	6	7	8	9	10	11	12	13	14	15	16	17	18	19	20	21	22	23	24	25	26	27	28	29	30
Ground	H	A	H	A	H	A	A	H	A	H	A	H	A	H	A	H	A	H	A	H	H	A	H	A	H	A	H	A	H	A
Result	W	W	W	D	W	D	W	W	L	W	W	D	L	W	W	L	W	W	W	D	W	D	W							
Position	2	5	2	3	2	2	1	1	2	2	2	2	3	2	1	3	3	2	2	2	1	2	2							

Updated to match(es) played on 20 September 2026. Source:
A = Away; H = Home; W = Win; D = Draw; L = Loss

==== Matches ====
7 April 2026 1	Kongsvinger	3–0	Bryne	Kongsvinger
19:00	Job 45+2'; Rasmus Christiansen 56'; Andreas Dybevik 58'	Report	Patrick Wik (yellow card) 88'	Stadium: Gjemselund Stadion; Attendance: 1,668; Referee: (Norway) Harald Sletner

13 April 2026 2	Raufoss	1–3	Kongsvinger	Raufoss
19:00	Kasey Wehrman (yellow card) 2'; Eirik Åsvestad 45+5'	Report	Ludvig Langrekken 2' (yellow card) 29'; Achinioti-Jönsson 22' (o.g.); Job 46'; Andreas Dybevik (yellow card) 66'	Stadium: Nammo Stadion; Attendance: 1,200; Referee: (Norway) Magnus Koløy

18 April 2026 3	Kongsvinger	2–1	Moss	Kongsvinger
14:00 CET	Rasmus Christiansen 50'; Job 82'	Report	Niclas Semmen (yellow card) 24'; Emmanuel Chidi (yellow card) 72'; William Kvale (yellow card) 75'; Robin Hermanstad 86'; Ole Nesselquist (yellow card) 87'	Stadium: Gjemselund Stadion; Attendance: 500; Referee: (Norway) Jan Tennøy

25 April 2026 4	Strømmen	2–2	Kongsvinger	Lillestrøm
18:00	Simen Beck (yellow card) 67'; Nikolai Hristov 81'; Maximilian Balatoni (yellow card) 89'; Deni Dashaev 90+4'	Report	Job 29'; Ludvig Langrekken 75'	Stadium: Strømmen Stadion; Attendance: 384; Referee: (Norway) Herman Holthe

1 May 2026 5	Kongsvinger	2–1	Egersund	Kongsvinger
16:00 CET	Mapenda Mbow (yellow card) 19'; Andreas Dybevik 28'; Ludvig Langrekken 65' (yellow card) 69'; Victor Fors (yellow card) 78'	Report	Kleppa (yellow card) 21'; Jönsson 68'; Oscar Kapskarmo (yellow card) 90+2'	Stadium: Gjemselund Stadion; Attendance: 2,033; Referee: (Norway) Steinar Hauge

8 May 2026 6	Ranheim	1–1	Kongsvinger	Trondheim
19:00	Oliver Holden 42'; Famara Camara (yellow card) 78'; Jonas Pereira (yellow card) 90+6'	Report	Job (yellow card) 25' (goal) 45+1'	Stadium: EXTRA Arena; Attendance: 1,021; Referee: (Norway) Ole-Alexander Valen

16 May 2026 7	Lyn	0–3	Kongsvinger	Oslo
16:00	Nilsen (yellow card) 45+1'; Alexander Pedersen (yellow card) 72'; Hellum (yellow card) 90+3'	Report	Vetle Lysell 8'; Sande 15'; Rasmus Christiansen 72'	Stadium: Bislett Stadium; Attendance: 3,470; Referee: (Norway) Anders Bodding

20 May 2026 8	Kongsvinger	4–2	Odd	Kongsvinger
19:00	Frederik Christensen 56' (pen.) (yellow card) 57'; Rasmus Christiansen 68'; Andreas Dybevik (yellow card) 68'; Ludvig Langrekken 73'; Herman Udnæs 88'	Report	Buus 31'; Hinrik Harðarson 86'	Stadium: Gjemselund Stadion; Attendance: 1,900; Referee: (Norway) Eirik Wisted

25 May 2026 9	Stabæk	2–0	Kongsvinger	Bærum
17:00	Sanyang 10'; Magnus Lankhof Dahlby 49' (yellow card) 67'; Karsten Arman Ekorness (yellow card) 76'	Report	Andreas Dybevik (yellow card) 45'	Stadium: Nadderud Stadion; Attendance: 460; Referee: (Norway) Jan Tennøy

31 May 2026 10	Kongsvinger	3–1	Åsane	Kongsvinger
17:00	Andreas Dybevik 51'; Victor Fors (yellow card) 80'; Frederik Christensen 83' (pen.); Ludvig Langrekken 89'	Report	Leonardo Rossi 36'; Dennis Møller Wolfe (yellow card) 45+4'	Stadium: Gjemselund Stadion; Attendance: 5,500; Referee: (Norway) Per Heiberg

14 June 2026 11	Hødd	1–2	Kongsvinger	Ulsteinvik
16:00				Stadium: Høddvoll Stadion

21 June 2026 12	Kongsvinger	4–4	Strømsgodset	Kongsvinger
14:00				Stadium: Gjemselund Stadion

=== Norwegian Football Cup ===
22–23 August 2026 First round	Skreia	v	Kongsvinger
