= 2026 Norwegian Second Division =

Norwegian football season

Norwegian Second Division
- Season: 2026
- Dates: 6 April – 31 October
- Matches: 364
- Top goalscorer: Benedict Notoane (14 goals)

The 2026 Norwegian Second Division will be a Norwegian men's football third-tier league season. The league consists of 28 teams divided into two groups of 14 teams.

The league will be played as a double round-robin tournament, where all teams play 26 matches. The season will start on 6 April and will end on 31 October, not including play-off matches.

== Team changes ==
The following teams have changed division since the 2025 season:

=== To Second Division ===
Promoted from Third Division

- Bjarg
- Junkeren
- Kvik Halden
- Lørenskog
- Trygg/Lade
- Vidar

Relegated from First Division

- Mjøndalen
- Skeid

=== From Second Division ===
Promoted to First Division

- Sandnes Ulf
- Strømmen

Relegated to Third Division

- Alta
- Asker
- Brann 2
- Fløy
- Strindheim
- Vard Haugesund

== Group 1 ==
=== Teams ===
Locations of the teams in Group 1 of the 2026 Norwegian Second Division

The following 14 clubs compete in Group 1:

Club	Municipality	Stadium	Capacity
Arendal	Arendal	Norac Stadion	5,000
Bjarg	Bergen	Stavollen Kunstgress	1,500
Brattvåg	Ålesund	Brattvåg Stadion	2,000
Eik Tønsberg	Tønsberg	Tønsberg Gressbane	5,500
Jerv	Grimstad	Levermyr Stadion	3,300
Kvik Halden	Halden	Halden Stadion	4,200
Lysekloster	Bjørnafjorden	Lysekloster Family Arena	1,500
Mjøndalen	Drammen	Consto Arena	4,200
Notodden	Notodden	Notodden Kunstgress	1,700
Pors	Porsgrunn	Pors Stadion	3,700
Sandviken	Bergen	Stemmemyren	1,500
Sotra	Øygarden	Straume Idrettspark	1,200
Træff	Molde	Reknesbanen	1,500
Vidar	Stavanger	Alustar Arena	

=== League table ===
Pos	Team	Pld	W	D	L	GF	GA	GD	Pts	Promotion, qualification or relegation
1	Jerv (P)	26	18	5	3	60	30	+30	59	Promotion to First Division
2	Bjarg (A)	26	17	3	6	60	31	+29	54	Qualification for promotion play-offs
3	Mjøndalen	26	17	2	7	50	34	+16	53	
4	Brattvåg	26	16	3	7	59	39	+20	51	
5	Sotra	26	15	3	8	62	32	+30	48	
6	Notodden	26	11	5	10	43	35	+8	38	
7	Træff	26	10	8	8	45	51	−6	38	
8	Kvik Halden	26	11	4	11	37	36	+1	37	
9	Arendal	26	8	7	11	36	42	−6	31	
10	Pors	26	8	6	12	33	38	−5	30	
11	Sandviken	26	7	6	13	34	49	−15	27	
12	Lysekloster (R)	26	5	7	14	35	56	−21	21 (Note: Lysekloster deducted 1 point on 17 September 2026 due to failure to meet interim targets in the action plan for the financial monitoring system)	Relegation to Third Division
13	Eik Tønsberg (R)	26	4	1	21	28	63	−35	13	Relegation to Third Division
14	Vidar (R)	26	3	4	19	24	70	−46	13	Relegation to Third Division

Updated to match(es) played on 31 October 2026. Source: NIFS (in Norwegian)
Rules for classification: 1) Points; 2) Goal difference; 3) Goals scored; 4) Head-to-head points; 5) Head-to-head goal difference; 6) Head-to-head goals scored.
(A) Advance to a further round; (P) Promoted; (R) Relegated

=== Results ===
Home \ Away	ARE	BJA	BRT	EIK	JER	KVI	LYS	MJØ	NOT	POR	SAN	SOT	TRÆ	VID
Arendal	—	0–2			1–2				2–2		0–0	1–1	3–1	
Bjarg		—	2–6	2–0		1–2	2–2				3–1			3–1
Brattvåg	2–0		—		1–2				2–0	2–1				3–0
Eik Tønsberg	0–0		0–2	—	2–3			1–2	0–1					3–1
Jerv		3–1			—	2–1		1–0			2–1		1–1	
Kvik Halden	3–1		0–2	1–0		—	4–0				0–0	2–1		
Lysekloster	1–1		1–1	3–1			—		0–2	1–2				1–1
Mjøndalen	4–1	1–0				3–3	2–1	—			4–0			2–0
Notodden		0–1			0–0	1–1		1–2	—				1–2	
Pors	2–4			2–0	0–3	0–1		1–0	1–2	—		0–0		
Sandviken			1–0				2–3		0–4	0–1	—	1–3	4–2	
Sotra		1–2	0–1	6–0	1–3		2–2	4–0				—		
Træff		2–3	2–0	3–1			4–0	2–2		3–3		0–2	—	
Vidar					1–3	2–4			0–5		0–1	1–3	1–1	—

Updated to match(es) played on 28 june 2026. Source: NFF (in Norwegian)
Legend: Blue = home team win; Yellow = draw; Red = away team win.

=== Season statistics ===
==== Top scorers ====
Rank	Player	Club(s)	Goals

==== Discipline ====
===== Player =====
- Most yellow cards:
- Most red cards:

===== Club =====
- Most yellow cards:
- Fewest yellow cards:
- Most red cards:
- Fewest red cards:

== Group 2 ==
=== Teams ===
Locations of the teams in Group 2 of the 2026 Norwegian Second Division

The following 14 clubs compete in Group 2:

Club	Municipality	Stadium	Capacity
Eidsvold Turn	Eidsvoll	Myhrer Stadion	1,500
Follo	Nordre Follo	Ski Stadion	2,100
Grorud	Oslo	Grorud Arctic Match	1,700
Hønefoss	Ringerike	Aka Arena	4,120
Junkeren	Bodø	Nordlandshallen	5,500
Kjelsås	Oslo	Grefsen Stadion	2,000
Levanger	Levanger	TOBB Arena Levanger	2,200
Lørenskog	Lørenskog	Rolvsrud Stadion	2,000
Rana	Rana	Sagbakken Stadion	2,000
Skeid	Oslo	Nordre Åsen	2,500
Stjørdals-Blink	Stjørdal	M.U.S Stadion Sandskogan	2,000
Tromsdalen	Tromsø	TUIL Arena	3,000
Trygg/Lade	Trondheim	Obosbanen	
Ullensaker/Kisa	Ullensaker	Jessheim Stadion	4,500

=== League table ===
Pos	Team	Pld	W	D	L	GF	GA	GD	Pts	Promotion, qualification or relegation
1	Eidsvold Turn (P)	26	19	3	4	63	27	+36	60	Promotion to First Division
2	Kjelsås (A)	26	19	2	5	63	35	+28	59	Qualification for promotion play-offs
3	Levanger	26	18	1	7	64	32	+32	55	
4	Grorud	26	15	4	7	47	26	+21	49	
5	Hønefoss	26	15	4	7	60	40	+20	49	
6	Lørenskog	26	12	4	10	45	45	0	40	
7	Stjørdals-Blink	26	12	3	11	45	44	+1	39	
8	Tromsdalen	26	12	2	12	48	44	+4	38	
9	Junkeren	26	10	4	12	39	47	−8	34	
10	Rana	26	10	3	13	40	48	−8	33	
11	Skeid	26	8	2	16	40	55	−15	26	
12	Follo (R)	26	5	5	16	34	54	−20	20	Relegation to Third Division
13	Ullensaker/Kisa (R)	26	4	1	21	30	85	−55	13	Relegation to Third Division
14	Trygg/Lade (R)	26	2	4	20	30	66	−36	10	Relegation to Third Division

Updated to match(es) played on 31 October 2026. Source: NIFS (in Norwegian)
Rules for classification: 1) Points; 2) Goal difference; 3) Goals scored; 4) Head-to-head points; 5) Head-to-head goal difference; 6) Head-to-head goals scored.
(A) Advance to a further round; (P) Promoted; (R) Relegated

=== Results ===
Home \ Away	EID	FOL	GRO	HØN	JUN	KJE	LEV	LØR	RAN	SKE	STJ	TRO	T/L	ULL
Eidsvold Turn	—	4–1					1–3	0–0	4–1		3–0	2–1		
Follo		—	2–3	2–2	2–0	1–4	0–2	0–1						1–2
Grorud	0–0		—	3–2	3–0		2–3			1–0			2–1	
Hønefoss	2–1			—			0–1	1–1	2–1		3–2		3–1	
Junkeren	0–1			4–3	—	2–3						1–1	3–2	3–0
Kjelsås	0–4		2–1	1–3		—		4–1		1–0		3–2		3–0
Levanger					3–0	1–2	—			2–1		2–3	3–0	
Lørenskog			1–0				1–0	—	1–2		2–1	6–0		5–1
Rana			0–0		1–2		2–3		—		3–2		1–0	
Skeid	1–2	2–0			1–0			1–2	3–3	—			7–1	
Stjørdals-Blink		1–2			1–1	1–1	1–2			0–1	—		2–1	
Tromsdalen			0–2	0–3					2–1	2–0	2–4	—		5–1
Trygg/Lade		2–2				1–3		1–4				1–2	—	4–2
Ullensaker/Kisa	2–5		2–1	0–3					1–3	5–3	2–3			—

Updated to match(es) played on 28 June 2026. Source: NFF (in Norwegian)
Legend: Blue = home team win; Yellow = draw; Red = away team win.

=== Season statistics ===
==== Top scorers ====
Rank	Player	Club(s)	Goals

==== Discipline ====
===== Player =====
- Most yellow cards:
- Most red cards:

===== Club =====
- Most yellow cards:
- Fewest yellow cards:
- Most red cards:
- Fewest red cards:

== Promotion play-offs ==
The teams who finish in second place in their respective group qualify for the promotion play-offs, where they face each other over two legs. The winner goes on to play against the 14th-placed team in the First Division for a place in the 2027 First Division.

November 2026

v
Report

November 2026

v
Report

== See also ==
- 2026 Eliteserien
- 2026 Norwegian First Division
- 2026 Norwegian Third Division
- 2025–26 Norwegian Football Cup
- 2026–27 Norwegian Football Cup
