= 2023 Norwegian Third Division =

Norwegian football season

Norwegian Third Division
- Season: 2023
- Promoted: Lysekloster; Eidsvold Turn; Viking 2 Eik Tønsberg; Strindheim; Follo
- Relegated: 18 teams
- Matches played: 1,092
- Goals scored: 4,435 (4.06 per match)
- Top goalscorer: Ulrik Ferrer (41 goals)

The 2023 Norwegian Third Division (referred to as Norsk Tipping-ligaen for sponsorship reasons) was a fourth-tier Norwegian football league season. The league consisted of 84 teams divided into 6 groups of 14 teams each. The season started on 10 April 2023 and ended on 29 October 2023. The league was played as a double round-robin tournament, where all teams played 26 matches.

== League tables ==
=== Group 1 ===
Pos	Team	Pld	W	D	L	GF	GA	GD	Pts	Promotion or relegation
1	Lysekloster (P)	26	23	1	2	72	23	+49	70	Promotion to Second Division
2	Frigg	26	18	2	6	98	45	+53	56	
3	Fana	26	16	3	7	69	40	+29	51	
4	Os	26	14	6	6	69	46	+23	48	
5	Sandviken	26	13	5	8	63	42	+21	44	
6	Gjelleråsen	26	12	6	8	57	41	+16	42	
7	Skjetten	26	11	5	10	36	47	−11	38	
8	Stabæk 2	26	9	7	10	50	55	−5	34	
9	Lillestrøm 2	26	9	2	15	47	68	−21	29	
10	Lokomotiv Oslo	26	7	7	12	31	38	−7	28	
11	Skedsmo	26	6	7	13	40	58	−18	25	
12	Gneist (R)	26	7	1	18	19	63	−44	22	Relegation to Fourth Division
13	Ullern 2 (R)	26	5	1	20	36	80	−44	16	Relegation to Fourth Division
14	Grorud 2 (R)	26	4	3	19	32	73	−41	15	Relegation to Fourth Division

Source: NFF (in Norwegian)
Rules for classification: 1) Points; 2) Goal difference; 3) Goals scored; 4) Head-to-head points; 5) Head-to-head goal difference; 6) Head-to-head goals scored.
(P) Promoted; (R) Relegated

=== Group 2 ===
Pos	Team	Pld	W	D	L	GF	GA	GD	Pts	Promotion or relegation
1	Eidsvold Turn (P)	26	25	0	1	109	26	+83	75	Promotion to Second Division
2	Hønefoss	26	24	1	1	80	19	+61	73	
3	Elverum	26	16	4	6	67	41	+26	52	
4	HamKam 2	26	9	8	9	66	57	+9	35	
5	Molde 2	26	10	5	11	55	59	−4	35	
6	Fu/Vo	26	10	5	11	50	54	−4	35	
7	Brumunddal (Note: Brumunddal withdrew from the league. Fyllingsdalen in group 3 escaped relegation as the best 12th-placed team.) (R)	26	9	8	9	44	59	−15	35	Relegation to Fourth Division
8	Florø	26	9	3	14	41	65	−24	30	
9	Hødd 2	26	8	5	13	52	72	−20	29	
10	Førde	26	8	4	14	56	55	+1	28	
11	Spjelkavik	26	7	6	13	45	51	−6	27	
12	Volda (R)	26	7	4	15	42	61	−19	25	Relegation to Fourth Division
13	Sogndal 2 (R)	26	6	7	13	48	68	−20	25	Relegation to Fourth Division
14	Raufoss 2 (R)	26	2	4	20	24	92	−68	10	Relegation to Fourth Division

Source: NFF (in Norwegian)
Rules for classification: 1) Points; 2) Goal difference; 3) Goals scored; 4) Head-to-head points; 5) Head-to-head goal difference; 6) Head-to-head goals scored.
(P) Promoted; (R) Relegated

=== Group 3 ===
Pos	Team	Pld	W	D	L	GF	GA	GD	Pts	Promotion or relegation
1	Viking 2 (P)	26	20	4	2	78	25	+53	64	Promotion to Second Division
2	Vidar	26	18	3	5	79	42	+37	57	
3	Bjarg	26	17	1	8	60	40	+20	52	
4	Djerv 1919	26	15	6	5	71	43	+28	51	
5	Brodd	26	11	7	8	35	32	+3	40	
6	Stord	26	11	6	9	48	46	+2	39	
7	Frøya	26	7	10	9	35	36	−1	31	
8	Sandnes Ulf 2	26	8	6	12	47	50	−3	30	
9	Staal Jørpeland	26	8	6	12	49	65	−16	30	
10	Loddefjord	26	8	5	13	38	56	−18	29	
11	Madla	26	7	7	12	43	53	−10	28	
12	Fyllingsdalen (Note: Brumunddal in group 2 withdrew from the league. Fyllingsdalen escaped relegation as the best 12th-placed team.)	26	8	3	15	44	63	−19	27	
13	Eiger (R)	26	6	1	19	35	63	−28	19	Relegation to Fourth Division
14	Bremnes (R)	26	4	3	19	33	81	−48	15	Relegation to Fourth Division

Source: NFF (in Norwegian)
Rules for classification: 1) Points; 2) Goal difference; 3) Goals scored; 4) Head-to-head points; 5) Head-to-head goal difference; 6) Head-to-head goals scored.
(P) Promoted; (R) Relegated

=== Group 4 ===
Pos	Team	Pld	W	D	L	GF	GA	GD	Pts	Promotion or relegation
1	Eik Tønsberg (P)	26	23	2	1	89	13	+76	71	Promotion to Second Division
2	Pors	26	20	4	2	70	30	+40	64	
3	Mandalskameratene	26	14	5	7	55	31	+24	47	
4	Odd 2	26	12	4	10	60	48	+12	40	
5	Sprint-Jeløy	26	12	2	12	58	40	+18	38	
6	Vindbjart	26	10	8	8	58	49	+9	38	
7	Sandefjord 2	26	10	5	11	55	59	−4	35	
8	Åskollen	26	11	1	14	53	72	−19	34	
9	Fredrikstad 2	26	9	4	13	43	45	−2	31	
10	Start 2	26	8	6	12	50	57	−7	30	
11	Mjøndalen 2	26	8	4	14	43	67	−24	28	
12	Halsen (R)	26	7	5	14	44	63	−19	26	Relegation to Fourth Division
13	Donn (R)	26	6	2	18	38	87	−49	20	Relegation to Fourth Division
14	Randesund (R)	26	3	6	17	21	76	−55	15	Relegation to Fourth Division

Source: NFF (in Norwegian)
Rules for classification: 1) Points; 2) Goal difference; 3) Goals scored; 4) Head-to-head points; 5) Head-to-head goal difference; 6) Head-to-head goals scored.
(P) Promoted; (R) Relegated

=== Group 5 ===
Pos	Team	Pld	W	D	L	GF	GA	GD	Pts	Promotion or relegation
1	Strindheim (P)	26	23	0	3	88	25	+63	69	Promotion to Second Division
2	Nardo	26	20	1	5	83	23	+60	61	
3	Rana	26	20	1	5	79	30	+49	61	
4	Byåsen	26	18	4	4	84	30	+54	58	
5	Tiller	26	10	5	11	43	41	+2	35	
6	Orkla	26	10	4	12	56	74	−18	34	
7	Kristiansund 2	26	10	3	13	45	57	−12	33	
8	Mosjøen	26	10	2	14	48	66	−18	32	
9	Rosenborg 2	26	9	3	14	54	57	−3	30	
10	Bodø/Glimt 2	26	8	5	13	53	60	−7	29	
11	Verdal	26	8	3	15	34	51	−17	27	
12	Steinkjer (R)	26	8	2	16	42	81	−39	26	Relegation to Fourth Division
13	Trønder-Lyn (R)	26	6	4	16	45	72	−27	22	Relegation to Fourth Division
14	Kolstad (R)	26	3	1	22	27	114	−87	10	Relegation to Fourth Division

Source: NFF (in Norwegian)
Rules for classification: 1) Points; 2) Goal difference; 3) Goals scored; 4) Head-to-head points; 5) Head-to-head goal difference; 6) Head-to-head goals scored.
(P) Promoted; (R) Relegated

=== Group 6 ===
Pos	Team	Pld	W	D	L	GF	GA	GD	Pts	Promotion or relegation
1	Follo (P)	26	22	3	1	80	22	+58	69	Promotion to Second Division
2	Lørenskog	26	18	1	7	75	30	+45	55	
3	Nordstrand	26	13	7	6	67	29	+38	46	
4	Asker	26	14	1	11	58	40	+18	43	
5	Oppsal	26	12	4	10	49	48	+1	40	
6	Skjervøy	26	12	4	10	57	57	0	40	
7	KFUM 2	26	13	1	12	49	50	−1	40	
8	Mjølner	26	11	5	10	51	49	+2	38	
9	Skeid 2	26	10	6	10	60	54	+6	36	
10	Fløya	26	9	6	11	45	45	0	33	
11	Sarpsborg 08 2	26	9	2	15	37	55	−18	29	
12	Tromsø 2 (R)	26	7	5	14	44	67	−23	26	Relegation to Fourth Division
13	Skånland (R)	26	8	1	17	41	59	−18	25	Relegation to Fourth Division
14	Hammerfest (R)	26	1	0	25	10	118	−108	3	Relegation to Fourth Division

Source: NFF (in Norwegian)
Rules for classification: 1) Points; 2) Goal difference; 3) Goals scored; 4) Head-to-head points; 5) Head-to-head goal difference; 6) Head-to-head goals scored.
(P) Promoted; (R) Relegated

== Top scorers ==
Rank	Player	Club	Goals
1	(Norway) Ulrik Ferrer	Frigg	41
2	(Norway) Julius Alexander Myrbakk	Eik Tønsberg	35
3	(Norway) Alexander Dang	Lysekloster	34
3	(Norway) Vital Curtis Kaba	Eidsvold Turn	34
5	(Norway) Jens-Erik Grønlie Johansen	Åskollen	27
6	(Norway) Mats Gramstad	Vidar	25
7	(Norway) Håvard Haugen Dalseth	Follo	22
7	(Norway) Omar Fonstad el Ghaouti	Hønefoss	22
9	(Norway) Simen Haughom	Vidar / Eiger	21
9	(Norway) Patrick Singstad Johansen	Byåsen	21
9	(Norway) Daniel Grimset Kvalvågnes	Os	21
9	(Norway) Fredrik Lund	Strindheim	21
9	(Norway) Ørjan Isaksen Skallebø	Skjervøy	21
