= 2026 Ranheim Fotball season =

Ranheim
2026 season
- Chairman: Kolbjørn Selmer
- Head coach: Christian Eggen Rismark
- Stadium: EXTRA Arena
- 1. divisjon: 6th
- 2026–27 Norwegian Cup: Pre-season
Home colours	Away colours	Third colours

The 2026 season is the 125th season in the history of Ranheim Fotball and the sixth consecutive season in the Norwegian First Division. The club will also participate in the 2026–27 Norwegian Football Cup.

== Transfers ==
=== In ===
Pos.	Player	Transferred from	Fee	Date	Source
DF	(Finland) Noah Pallas	(Norway) Vålerenga Fotball	Loan	9 March 2026	

== Pre-season and friendlies ==
31 January 2026	Stjørdals-Blink	0–0	Ranheim

6 February 2026	Ranheim	3–1	Brattvåg IL

19 February 2026	Ranheim	1–2	Rosenborg

22 February 2026	Stabæk	5–2	Ranheim

2 March 2026	Sandefjord	1–0	Ranheim

8 March 2026	Kristiansund	1–1	Ranheim

28 March 2026	Ranheim	0–0	(Sweden) Östersunds FK

== Competitions ==
=== Overall record ===
Competition	First match	Last match	Starting round	Record							
Competition	First match	Last match	Starting round	Pld	W	D	L	GF	GA	GD	Win %
Norwegian First Division	12 April 2026		Matchday 1	11	5	2	4	29	24	+5	45.45
2026–27 Norwegian Football Cup				0	0	0	0	0	0	+0	—
Total				11	5	2	4	29	24	+5	45.45

Source: Competitions

=== Norwegian First Division ===
Pos	Team	Pld	W	D	L	GF	GA	GD	Pts	Promotion, qualification or relegation
4	Odd	10	7	1	2	23	12	+11	22	Qualification for the promotion play-offs second round
5	Stabæk	10	5	3	2	22	12	+10	18	Qualification for the promotion play-offs first round
6	Ranheim	9	5	1	3	26	18	+8	16	Qualification for the promotion play-offs first round
7	Hødd	10	4	2	4	13	13	0	14	
8	Moss	10	4	2	4	16	20	−4	14	

Updated to match(es) played on 31 May 2026. Source: OBOS-ligaen (in Norwegian)
Rules for classification: 1) Points; 2) Goal difference; 3) Goals scored; 4) Head-to-head points; 5) Head-to-head goal difference; 6) Head-to-head goals scored.

==== Results summary ====
Overall								Home						Away					
Pld	W	D	L	GF	GA	GD	Pts	W	D	L	GF	GA	GD	W	D	L	GF	GA	GD
0	0	0	0	0	0	0	0	0	0	0	0	0	0	0	0	0	0	0	0

==== Results by round ====
Round	1	2	3	4	5	6	7	8	9
Ground	H	A	H	A	H	H	A	H	A
Result	D	W	W	L	W	D	L	W	L
Position									

A = Away; H = Home; W = Win; D = Draw; L = Loss; P = Postponed

==== Matches ====
The match schedule was issued on 19 December 2025.

12 April 2026 2	Bryne	2–3	Ranheim

17 April 2026 3	Ranheim	5–1	Raufoss

27 April 2026 4	Egersund	3–0	Ranheim

1 May 2026 5	Ranheim	4–0	Moss

8 May 2026 6	Ranheim	1–1	Kongsvinger

16 May 2026 7	Strømsgodset	5–4	Ranheim

20 May 2026 8	Ranheim	3–2	Hødd

25 May 2026 9	Odd	3–1	Ranheim

7 June 2026 1	Ranheim	2–2	Strømmen	Ranheim
17:00				Stadium: EXTRA Arena

14 June 2026 11	Haugesund	4–1	Ranheim	Haugesund
16:00				Stadium: Haugesund Stadion

=== Norwegian Football Cup ===
22–23 August 2026 First round	Steinkjer	v	Ranheim
