= 2026 Egersunds IK season =

Egersund
2026 season
- Chairman: Bernt Blitzner
- Head coach: Endre Eide (until 20 April); Marius Kjørvik Johansen (from 20 April)
- Stadium: Idrettsparken
- 1. divisjon: 11th
- 2025–26 Norwegian Cup: Fourth round
- 2026–27 Norwegian Cup: Pre-season
Home colours	Away colours

The 2026 season is the 107th season in the history of Egersunds Idrettsklubb and the third consecutive season in the Norwegian First Division. In addition, the club will participate in the 2026–27 Norwegian Football Cup.

== Transfers ==
=== Out ===
Pos.	Player	Transferred to	Fee	Date	Source
MF	(Sweden) Paya Pichkah	(Sweden) IF Brommapojkarna	Loan return	31 December 2025	

== Pre-season and friendlies ==
31 January 2026	Vidar	1–4	Egersund

8 February 2026	Egersund	1–2	(Montenegro) Budućnost Podgorica	Spain

15 February 2026	Kristiansund	1–1	Egersund

27 February 2026	Egersund	2–2	Sandnes Ulf

13 March 2026	Stabæk	1–1	Egersund

21 March 2026	Haugesund	2–0	Egersund

28 March 2026	Egersund	4–3	Bryne

== Competitions ==
=== Overall record ===
Competition	First match	Last match	Starting round	Final position	Record							
Competition	First match	Last match	Starting round	Final position	Pld	W	D	L	GF	GA	GD	Win %
Norwegian First Division	11 April 2026		Matchday 1		12	5	1	6	19	21	−2	41.67
2025–26 Norwegian Football Cup	9 March 2026		Fourth round	Fourth round	1	0	0	1	2	3	−1	0.00
2026–27 Norwegian Football Cup					0	0	0	0	0	0	+0	—
Total					13	5	1	7	21	24	−3	38.46

Source: Competitions

=== Norwegian First Division ===
Pos	Team	Pld	W	D	L	GF	GA	GD	Pts
7	Moss	12	5	2	5	21	26	−5	17
8	Sandnes Ulf	12	5	1	6	18	19	−1	16
9	Egersund	12	5	1	6	19	21	−2	16
10	Bryne	12	5	1	6	18	20	−2	16
11	Hødd	12	4	3	5	14	15	−1	15

Updated to match(es) played on 21 June 2026. Source: OBOS-ligaen (in Norwegian)
Rules for classification: 1) Points; 2) Goal difference; 3) Goals scored; 4) Head-to-head points; 5) Head-to-head goal difference; 6) Head-to-head goals scored.

==== Results summary ====
Overall								Home						Away					
Pld	W	D	L	GF	GA	GD	Pts	W	D	L	GF	GA	GD	W	D	L	GF	GA	GD
0	0	0	0	0	0	0	0	0	0	0	0	0	0	0	0	0	0	0	0

==== Results by round ====
Round	1	2	3	4	5	6	7	8	9	10
Ground	H	A	H	H	A	H	A	H	A	H
Result	W	W	W	W	L	L	L	D	L	L
Position										

A = Away; H = Home; W = Win; D = Draw; L = Loss

==== Matches ====
The match schedule was issued on 19 December 2025.

11 April 2026 2	Strømmen	0–3	Egersund

19 April 2026 3	Egersund	1–0	Bryne

27 April 2026 4	Egersund	3–0	Ranheim

1 May 2026 5	Kongsvinger	2–1	Egersund

6 May 2026 1	Egersund	2–1	Raufoss

11 May 2026 6	Egersund	0–1	Odd

15 May 2026 7	Sandnes Ulf	4–2	Egersund

20 May 2026 8	Egersund	0–0	Lyn

25 May 2026 9	Hødd	3–1	Egersund

31 May 2026 10	Egersund	0–5	Strømsgodset

14 June 2026 11	Stabæk	3–1	Egersund	Bekkestua
16:00				Stadium: New Nadderud Stadium

21 June 2026 12	Egersund	5–2	Haugesund	Egersund
16:00				Stadium: XL-Bygg Sørvest Arena

4 July 2026 14	Egersund	3–0	Moss	Egersund
14:00

=== Norwegian Football Cup ===
==== 2025–26 ====
9 March 2026 Fourth round	Egersund	2–3	Aalesund

==== 2026–27 ====
22–23 August 2026 First round	Våg	v	Egersund
