= 2026 Sandnes Ulf season =

Sandnes Ulf
2026 season
- Chairman: Stig Ravndal
- Head coach: Arturo Cleveland
- Stadium: Øster Hus Arena
- 1. divisjon: 10th
- 2026–27 Norwegian Cup: Pre-season
Home colours	Away colours

The 2026 season is the 115th season in the history of Sandnes Ulf and their first season in the first division after a one-season absence in the second division. Additionally, the club will participate in the 2026–27 Norwegian Football Cup.

== Transfers ==
=== In ===
Pos.	Player	Transferred from	Fee	Date	Source
GK	(Norway) Tord Flolid	(Norway) Sarpsborg 08	Loan return	31 December 2025	
FW	(Norway) Peder Brekke	(Norway) Alta IF		1 January 2026	
FW	(Norway) Mathias Sundberg	(Norway) Strømmen		23 December 2025	
DF	(Norway) Axel Kryger	(Norway) Kristiansund		24 December 2025	
MF	(Faroe Islands) Olaf Bárðarson	(Faroe Islands) Víkingur Gøta	Undisclosed	14 January 2026	
MF	(Republic of the Congo) Zifarlino Nsoni	(Denmark) Skive IK		21 January 2026	
MF	(Norway) Yann-Erik de Lanlay	(Norway) Viking	Free	26 February 2026	
DF	(Ghana) Jamal Deen Haruna	(Norway) Sogndal	Loan	12 March 2026	

== Pre-season and friendlies ==
30 January 2026	Sandnes Ulf	0–2	Viking

6 February 2026	Vidar	0–1	Sandnes Ulf

27 February 2026	Egersund	2–2	Sandnes Ulf

14 March 2026	Sandnes Ulf	6–0	Vard Haugesund

20 March 2026	Vidar	1–2	Sandnes Ulf

30 March 2026	Sandnes Ulf	2–2	Haugesund

== Competitions ==
=== Overall record ===
Competition	First match	Last match	Starting round	Record							
Competition	First match	Last match	Starting round	Pld	W	D	L	GF	GA	GD	Win %
Norwegian First Division	7 April 2026		Matchday 1	9	3	1	5	11	13	−2	33.33
2025–26 Norwegian Football Cup			Fourth round	0	0	0	0	0	0	+0	—
2026–27 Norwegian Football Cup				0	0	0	0	0	0	+0	—
Total				9	3	1	5	11	13	−2	33.33

Source: Competitions

=== Norwegian First Division ===
Pos	Team	Pld	W	D	L	GF	GA	GD	Pts	Promotion, qualification or relegation
6	Ranheim	12	6	2	4	32	26	+6	20	Qualification for the promotion play-offs first round
7	Moss	12	5	2	5	21	26	−5	17	
8	Sandnes Ulf	12	5	1	6	18	19	−1	16	
9	Egersund	12	5	1	6	19	21	−2	16	
10	Bryne	12	5	1	6	18	20	−2	16	

Updated to match(es) played on 21 June 2026. Source: OBOS-ligaen (in Norwegian)
Rules for classification: 1) Points; 2) Goal difference; 3) Goals scored; 4) Head-to-head points; 5) Head-to-head goal difference; 6) Head-to-head goals scored.

==== Results summary ====
Overall								Home						Away					
Pld	W	D	L	GF	GA	GD	Pts	W	D	L	GF	GA	GD	W	D	L	GF	GA	GD
0	0	0	0	0	0	0	0	0	0	0	0	0	0	0	0	0	0	0	0

==== Results by round ====
Round	1	2	3	4	5	6	7	8	9
Ground	A	H	A	H	A	H	H	A	H
Result	L	L	W	D	L	L	W	L	W
Position									

A = Away; H = Home; W = Win; D = Draw; L = Loss

==== Matches ====
The match schedule was issued on 19 December 2025.

7 April 2026 1	Hødd	2–1	Sandnes Ulf

11 April 2026 2	Sandnes Ulf	1–3	Odd

20 April 2026 3	Lyn	0–2	Sandnes Ulf

26 April 2026 4	Sandnes Ulf	1–1	Strømsgodset

1 May 2026 5	Haugesund	2–0	Sandnes Ulf

10 May 2026 6	Sandnes Ulf	0–1	Stabæk

15 May 2026 7	Sandnes Ulf	4–2	Egersund

20 May 2026 8	Åsane	2–0	Sandnes Ulf

25 May 2026 9	Sandnes Ulf	2–0	Sogndal

14 June 2026 11	Sandnes Ulf	2–0	Strømmen	Sandnes
16:00				Stadium: Øster Hus Arena

4 July 2026 14	Bryne	1–1	Sandnes Ulf	Bryne
18:00

=== Norwegian Football Cup ===
26 August 2026 First round	Varhaug	v	Sandnes Ulf
