= Julian Lægreid =

Norwegian footballer (born 2007)

Personal information
- Date of birth: 8 March 2007 (age 19)
- Place of birth: Øvre Årdal, Norway
- Position: Left winger

Team information
- Current team: Brann
- Number: 39

Youth career
- –2022: Jotun
- 2022–2025: Brann

Senior career*
Years	Team	Apps	(Gls)
2022	Årdal	15	(11)
2023–	Brann	3	(0)
2023	→ Årdal (loan)	7	(5)
2026	→ Moss (loan)	18	(5)

International career^{‡}
2022	Norway U15	2	(0)
2023	Norway U16	7	(3)
2024	Norway U17	2	(1)
2025	Norway U18	7	(2)
2025	Norway U20	3	(0)
2026	Norway U19	5	(0)
- * Club domestic league appearances and goals as of 5 October 2026 ‡ National team caps and goals as of 5 October 2026

Julian Lægreid (born 8 March 2007) is a Norwegian footballer who plays as a left winger for Brann.

== Career ==
Lægreid played youth football for Jotun. In 2022, he played senior football for Årdal in the Norwegian Fourth Division. In December 2022, he signed a contract with Brann through the 2025 season, but was loaned back to Årdal for the first half of the 2023 season while he completed middle school.

At the age of 18, Lægreid made his first-team debut for Brann in April 2025, coming on as a substitute in an away victory over Bjarg in the second round of the Norwegian Cup.

Lægreid was part of the Norway U20 squad at the 2025 FIFA U-20 World Cup in Chile, where he made three appearances. He later made his Europa League debut for Brann on 6 November 2025.

In March 2026, Lægreid joined Moss on loan. He made 18 appearances and scored five goals during his spell at the club before being recalled by Brann in August 2026.

On 23 August 2026, Lægreid scored his first goal for Brann in a 4–0 victory over Fyllingen in the first round of the Norwegian Cup.
