= Eirik Asante Gayi =

Norwegian footballer (born 2001)

Personal information
- Date of birth: 23 January 2001 (age 25)
- Place of birth: Norway
- Position: Midfielder

Team information
- Current team: Pors
- Number: 25

Youth career
- –2016: Eidanger
- 2018–2020: Odd

Senior career*
Years	Team	Apps	(Gls)
2016–2017	Eidanger	13	(0)
2020–2022	Odd	2	(0)
2022–2024	Brage	52	(0)
2024–2025	Sandnes Ulf	32	(0)
2026–	Pors	24	(2)
- * Club domestic league appearances and goals as of 15 November 2026

Eirik Asante Gayi (born 23 January 2001) is a Norwegian footballer who plays as a midfielder for Pors.

He played youth and senior football for Eidanger IL before joining Odd's junior setup. In May 2020 he signed with Odd's first team on a 1.5-year deal. He made his Eliteserien debut in December 2020 against Molde.
