= Elias Myrlid =

Norwegian footballer (born 2002)

Personal information
- Full name: Elias Heggland Myrlid
- Date of birth: 4 August 2002 (age 24)
- Position: Striker

Team information
- Current team: Aalesund
- Number: 17

Youth career
- –2020: Os
- 2021–2022: Brann

Senior career*
Years	Team	Apps	(Gls)
2018–2019	Os	5	(1)
2021–2023	Brann 2	42	(39)
2023	Brann	5	(0)
2023	→ Kristiansund (loan)	3	(0)
2023	→ Kongsvinger (loan)	10	(2)
2024–2025	Hødd	36	(15)
2025–	Aalesund	30	(4)
- * Club domestic league appearances and goals as of 10 August 2026

Elias Myrlid (born 4 August 2002) is a Norwegian footballer who plays as a striker for Aalesunds FK.

He started his youth career in Os TF, making his first-team debut in 2018 against Telavåg, and even scoring on his debut. Having played sparingly for Os, the 2020 season (below the Second Division) was then cancelled in 2020, with Myrlid therefore only playing youth football for Os that season. In 2021 he moved to the academy of SK Brann.

His performances for Brann's senior B team were stellar, scoring 16 goals in just 11 games in 2021, followed by 17 goals in 2022. The team was subsequently promoted from the Third Division, but Myrlid also managed 6 goals in 7 matches in the 2023 2. divisjon. Nevertheless, he was told by B team coach Azar Karadas to lead a more professional lifestyle.

At the start of 2023, Myrlid was loaned out to second-tier club Kristiansund. After only three games, Brann mandated his return; at this time he signed his first contract with the senior team. Myrlid's Eliteserien debut for Brann came in the 16 May Game of 2023. He totaled five appearances in Eliteserien in addition to five cup matches, before being loaned out again, this time to Kongsvinger. Here, he again scored on his debut, against Ranheim.

Having returned to Brann, he was bought by IL Hødd at the very end of the 2024 winter transfer window. As Myrlid scored 9 goals in the 2024 2. divisjon and 6 goals in the first half of the 2025 1. divisjon, he was bought out by rivals Aalesunds FK. Swedish second-tier club Helsingborgs IF was also in contention to sign the striker.

In the 2026 Norwegian Cup, Myrlid scored a hat-trick for Aalesund in the first round, and followed up with two goals in the second round.
