= 2024 Norwegian Second Division =

Norwegian football season

Norwegian Second Division
- Season: 2024
- Dates: 6 April – 26 October
- Champions: Hødd; Skeid
- Promoted: Hødd; Skeid
- Relegated: Gjøvik-Lyn; Junkeren; Kvik Halden; Vålerenga 2 Viking 2 Ørn Horten
- Matches: 364
- Goals: 1,254 (3.45 per match)

The 2024 Norwegian Second Division (referred to as PostNord-ligaen for sponsorship reasons) was a Norwegian football third-tier league season. The league consists of 28 teams divided into two groups of 14 teams.

The league was played as a double round-robin tournament, where all teams played 26 matches. The season started on 6 April 2024 and ended on 26 October 2024, not including play-off matches.

== Team changes ==
Last season, Egersund, Lyn, and Levanger were promoted to the 2024 Norwegian First Division, while Træff, Fram Larvik, Aalesund 2, Bærum, Strømsgodset 2, and Ullern were relegated to the 2024 Norwegian Third Division.

Hødd, Jerv, and Skeid were relegated from the 2023 Norwegian First Division, while Lysekloster, Eidsvold Turn, Viking 2, Eik Tønsberg, Strindheim, and Follo were promoted from the 2023 Norwegian Third Division.

== Group 1 ==
=== Teams ===
Locations of the 2024 Norwegian Second Division group 1 teams.

The following 14 clubs compete in group 1:

Club	Municipality	Stadium	Capacity
Arendal	Arendal	Norac Stadion	5,000
Brann 2	Bergen	Varden Amfi	3,500
Brattvåg	Ålesund	Brattvåg Stadion	2,000
Eik Tønsberg	Tønsberg	Tønsberg Gressbane	5,500
Fløy	Kristiansand	Cemo Arena	2,000
Hødd	Ulstein	Høddvoll	4,081
Jerv	Grimstad	Levermyr Stadion	3,300
Kvik Halden	Halden	Halden Stadion	4,200
Lysekloster	Bjørnafjorden	Lysekloster Family Arena	1,500
Notodden	Notodden	Notodden Kunstgress	1,700
Sotra	Øygarden	Straume Idrettspark	1,200
Vard	Haugesund	Haugesund Sparebank Arena	8,754
Viking 2	Stavanger	SR-Bank Arena	15,900
Ørn	Horten	Lystlunden Stadion	3,000

=== League table ===
Pos	Team	Pld	W	D	L	GF	GA	GD	Pts	Promotion, qualification or relegation
1	Hødd (C, P)	26	18	4	4	50	22	+28	58	Promotion to First Division
2	Jerv	26	14	6	6	46	33	+13	48	Qualification for promotion play-offs
3	Eik Tønsberg	26	13	6	7	40	34	+6	45	
4	Brattvåg	26	13	3	10	57	45	+12	42	
5	Lysekloster	26	13	2	11	47	42	+5	41	
6	Brann 2	26	11	5	10	52	49	+3	38	
7	Sotra	26	9	8	9	32	30	+2	35	
8	Vard Haugesund	26	10	4	12	45	49	−4	34	
9	Notodden	26	9	7	10	29	33	−4	34	
10	Arendal	26	10	3	13	34	41	−7	33	
11	Fløy	26	10	3	13	29	41	−12	33	
12	Viking 2 (R)	26	9	4	13	49	45	+4	31	Relegation to Third Division
13	Ørn Horten (R)	26	6	6	14	27	40	−13	24	Relegation to Third Division
14	Kvik Halden (R)	26	4	5	17	28	61	−33	17	Relegation to Third Division

Source: NIFS (in Norwegian)
Rules for classification: 1) Points; 2) Goal difference; 3) Goals scored; 4) Head-to-head points; 5) Head-to-head goal difference; 6) Head-to-head goals scored.
(C) Champions; (P) Promoted; (R) Relegated

=== Results ===
Home \ Away	ARE	BRN	BRA	EIK	FLØ	HØD	JER	KVI	LYS	NOT	SOT	VAR	VIK	ØRN
Arendal	—	0–2	3–0	1–2	2–1	1–6	3–3	2–1	1–3	1–2	0–1	3–1	2–1	1–0
Brann 2	3–1	—	4–3	3–4	2–0	0–0	2–1	0–3	2–1	1–2	1–1	7–3	1–3	1–2
Brattvåg	3–2	1–2	—	3–0	2–1	0–2	3–4	6–1	3–3	2–0	5–1	2–0	3–1	2–2
Eik Tønsberg	1–1	1–2	2–2	—	2–1	1–1	3–2	2–1	2–1	1–2	1–0	1–1	4–3	3–1
Fløy	1–0	3–3	2–0	2–1	—	0–3	0–2	2–2	2–1	3–0	0–3	2–3	0–1	0–0
Hødd	2–1	2–3	3–1	1–0	3–0	—	1–0	1–0	3–2	1–0	1–0	2–1	2–1	3–1
Jerv	3–0	2–1	1–3	0–0	2–1	2–1	—	3–1	3–1	0–0	1–1	5–2	2–1	1–0
Kvik Halden	0–3	0–0	0–1	0–2	2–3	1–1	2–3	—	1–2	2–3	0–0	1–3	4–1	1–0
Lysekloster	2–1	4–3	4–3	1–0	0–2	0–1	3–0	5–0	—	1–2	0–1	1–3	2–1	1–0
Notodden	0–1	2–1	0–2	0–0	0–1	0–4	0–1	3–0	1–1	—	0–0	4–0	1–1	2–2
Sotra	2–1	4–4	1–2	1–2	0–1	1–1	0–2	3–0	1–2	2–1	—	4–0	1–1	2–0
Vard Haugesund	0–1	1–0	1–3	0–1	2–0	2–0	1–1	8–0	1–3	3–1	1–1	—	1–1	2–4
Viking 2	0–1	3–1	3–2	1–2	5–0	1–3	2–1	3–3	5–1	2–3	3–0	1–3	—	4–0
Ørn Horten	1–1	2–3	2–0	3–2	0–1	3–2	1–1	1–2	0–2	0–0	0–1	0–2	2–0	—

Source: Norwegian Football Federation
Legend: Blue = home team win; Yellow = draw; Red = away team win.

== Group 2 ==
=== Teams ===
Locations of the 2024 Norwegian Second Division group 2 teams.

The following 14 clubs compete in group 2:

Club	Municipality	Stadium	Capacity
Alta	Alta	SmartDok Arena	1,200
Eidsvold Turn	Eidsvoll	Myhrer Stadion	1,500
Follo	Nordre Follo	Ski Stadion	2,100
Gjøvik-Lyn	Gjøvik	Gjøvik Stadion	3,000
Grorud	Oslo	Grorud Arctic Match	1,700
Junkeren	Bodø	Nordlandshallen	5,500
Kjelsås	Oslo	Grefsen Stadion	2,000
Skeid	Oslo	Nordre Åsen Kunstgress	2,500
Stjørdals-Blink	Stjørdal	M.U.S Stadion Sandskogan	2,000
Strindheim	Trondheim	Leangen Bolig Arena	1,500
Strømmen	Lillestrøm	Strømmen Stadion	1,850
Tromsdalen	Tromsø	TUIL Arena	3,000
Ull/Kisa	Ullensaker	Jessheim Stadion	4,500
Vålerenga 2	Oslo	Intility Arena	16,555

=== League table ===
Pos	Team	Pld	W	D	L	GF	GA	GD	Pts	Promotion, qualification or relegation
1	Skeid (C, P)	26	17	7	2	53	20	+33	58	Promotion to First Division
2	Tromsdalen	26	18	3	5	73	44	+29	57	Qualification for promotion play-offs
3	Strømmen	26	14	4	8	49	38	+11	46	
4	Eidsvold Turn	26	14	4	8	53	45	+8	46	
5	Grorud	26	12	9	5	73	45	+28	45	
6	Kjelsås	26	13	6	7	50	39	+11	45	
7	Stjørdals-Blink	26	13	5	8	57	35	+22	44	
8	Ull/Kisa	26	12	5	9	51	41	+10	41	
9	Follo	26	10	4	12	46	57	−11	34	
10	Alta	26	8	8	10	58	51	+7	32	
11	Strindheim	26	9	3	14	44	46	−2	30	
12	Junkeren (R)	26	7	2	17	41	70	−29	23	Relegation to Third Division
13	Gjøvik-Lyn (R)	26	2	2	22	14	65	−51	8	Relegation to Third Division
14	Vålerenga 2 (R)	26	2	0	24	27	93	−66	6	Relegation to Third Division

Source: NIFS (in Norwegian)
Rules for classification: 1) Points; 2) Goal difference; 3) Goals scored; 4) Head-to-head points; 5) Head-to-head goal difference; 6) Head-to-head goals scored.
(C) Champions; (P) Promoted; (R) Relegated

=== Results ===
Home \ Away	ALT	EID	FOL	GJØ	GRO	JUN	KJE	SKE	STJ	SND	STR	TRO	ULL	VÅL
Alta	—	2–4	3–1	1–1	1–2	5–0	2–2	2–5	6–1	5–1	2–2	2–2	1–1	5–0
Eidsvold Turn	2–2	—	4–2	2–0	2–4	4–2	3–1	0–0	0–3	3–1	2–1	0–1	1–0	2–1
Follo	4–0	0–2	—	0–0	2–2	3–2	0–0	0–1	2–3	2–0	2–1	3–1	3–0	4–6
Gjøvik-Lyn	0–1	0–2	0–4	—	1–2	0–1	0–3	0–1	0–2	0–1	1–2	1–2	1–4	3–1
Grorud	3–1	2–2	5–2	8–0	—	5–0	1–3	0–0	1–1	1–3	2–3	4–1	3–4	3–1
Junkeren	3–2	3–1	3–4	3–0	2–5	—	0–3	0–2	0–3	2–3	0–0	2–3	3–0	2–0
Kjelsås	2–2	2–2	2–0	3–1	3–4	3–2	—	0–0	2–1	3–1	1–4	2–4	2–0	3–1
Skeid	3–2	6–1	6–0	3–0	2–2	3–1	1–0	—	2–1	0–0	2–1	2–2	0–2	3–1
Stjørdals-Blink	0–2	2–0	4–2	4–0	2–2	4–0	2–2	0–0	—	2–0	6–0	2–3	2–2	6–0
Strindheim	3–1	0–2	1–1	5–0	1–1	4–0	1–2	0–3	1–2	—	0–1	4–1	0–4	6–1
Strømmen	1–0	2–3	2–0	3–0	2–2	2–2	2–3	0–1	2–0	3–0	—	1–0	4–3	4–2
Tromsdalen	4–2	3–0	8–0	4–0	4–3	4–2	4–1	4–3	4–1	3–2	3–2	—	1–1	3–0
Ull/Kisa	2–2	4–3	1–2	3–1	1–1	5–1	0–2	0–1	2–1	3–0	1–2	2–1	—	2–1
Vålerenga 2	2–4	1–6	0–3	0–4	1–5	2–5	1–0	1–3	0–2	0–6	0–2	2–3	2–4	—

Source: Norwegian Football Federation
Legend: Blue = home team win; Yellow = draw; Red = away team win.

== Promotion play-offs ==
The teams who finish in second place in their respective group qualify for the promotion play-offs, where they face each other over two legs. The winner goes on to play against the 14th-placed team in the First Division for a place in the First Division next season.

3 November 2024
14:00 CET

Tromsdalen	0–1	Jerv
	Report	Wilson 51'

TUIL Arena, Tromsø
Attendance: 664
Referee: Jørgen Haugen
9 November 2024
16:00 CET

Jerv	2–1	Tromsdalen
Seufert 41' (pen.); Wilson 69'	Report	Hafstad 73'

Levermyr Stadion, Grimstad
Attendance: 1,567
Referee: Magnus Nicolai Koløy
