= 2026 Norwegian Fourth Division =

4. divisjon
- Season: 2026
- Promoted: 18 teams

The 2026 season of the 4. divisjon, the fifth highest association football league for men in Norway.

Districts with group winners earning automatic promotion to 3. divisjon:

- Agder
- Akershus
- Hordaland 1
- Hordaland 2
- Indre Østland
- Oslo 1
- Oslo 2
- Rogaland 1
- Rogaland 2
- Sogn og Fjordane
- Trøndelag 1
- Trøndelag 2

District with group winners entering qualifiers to earn promotion to 3. divisjon:

- Vestfold vs Østfold
- Buskerud vs Telemark
- Nordmøre og Romsdal vs Sunnmøre
- Finnmark, Hålogaland, Nordland and Troms battle for three promotion spots
  - Two and two Group winners face each other. Winners are promoted
  - Losing teams in previous matchups face each other on neutral ground, where the winner earns promotion

== Teams ==
Østfold

1. Fredrikstad 2 – lost playoff
2. Sarpsborg
3. Sprint-Jeløy
4. Moss 2
5. Sparta Sarpsborg
6. Østsiden
7. Kråkerøy
8. Rakkestad
9. Drøbak-Frogn 2
10. Ås
11. Ekholt
12. Idd
13. Borgen – relegated
14. Selbak – relegated

Oslo 1

1. Christiania – promoted
2. Haslum
3. Grüner
4. Skeid 2
5. Holmlia
6. Lommedalen
7. Årvoll
8. Lokomotiv Oslo 2
9. Gui
10. Bærum 2
11. Nordstrand 2 – relegated
12. Asker 2

Oslo 2

1. Kolbotn – promoted
2. Korsvoll
3. Kjelsås 2
4. Grorud 2
5. Lambertseter
6. Stovner
7. Nesodden
8. Follo 2
9. Oppsal 2
10. Manglerud Star
11. Ready 2
12. Ullern 2 – relegated

Akershus

1. Eidsvold IF – promoted
2. Funnefoss/Vormsund
3. Leirsund
4. Fjellhamar
5. Lørenskog 2
6. Raumnes & Årnes
7. Gjelleråsen
8. Hauerseter
9. Aurskog-Finstadbru
10. Fet
11. Sørumsand
12. Ullensaker/Kisa 2
13. Strømmen 2
14. Eidsvold Turn 2

Indre Østland

1. HamKam 2 – promoted
2. Skreia
3. Nybergsund
4. Odal
5. Lillehammer 2
6. Kolbu KK
7. Reinsvoll
8. Ridabu
9. Flisa
10. Raufoss 2
11. Gjøvik-Lyn 2
12. Toten
13. Trysil
14. Follebu Gausdal

Buskerud

1. Åssiden – won playoff
2. Modum
3. Hallingdal
4. Drammens BK
5. Hønefoss 2
6. Lier
7. Åskollen
8. Vestfossen
9. Stoppen
10. Birkebeineren
11. Mjøndalen 2
12. Jevnaker
13. Graabein
14. Hokksund

Vestfold

1. Flint – won playoff
2. Larvik Turn
3. Teie
4. Sandar
5. Åsgårdstrand
6. Store Bergan
7. Barkåker
8. Eik Tønsberg 2
9. Ørn-Horten 2
10. Tønsberg FK
11. Runar
12. Sandefjord BK

Telemark

1. Urædd – lost playoff
2. Hei
3. Eidanger
4. Tollnes
5. Storm
6. Pors 2
7. Langangen
8. Odd 3
9. Notodden 2
10. Brevik
11. Skidar
12. Snøgg

Agder

1. Flekkefjord – promoted
2. Start 2
3. Jerv 2
4. Express
5. Donn
6. Øyestad
7. Vigør
8. Tigerberget
9. Søgne
10. Vindbjart 2
11. Trauma
12. Randesund
13. Giv Akt
14. Lyngdal

Rogaland 1

1. Rosseland – promoted
2. Sola
3. Randaberg
4. Bryne 2
5. Ålgård
6. Vardeneset
7. Frøyland
8. Vidar 2
9. Egersund 2
10. Forus og Gausel
11. Midtbygden
12. Eiger

Rogaland 2

1. Nord – promoted
2. Haugar
3. Sandnes Ulf 2
4. Hana
5. Kopervik
6. Torvastad
7. Ganddal
8. Vedavåg Karmøy
9. Vard Haugesund 2
10. Avaldsnes
11. Riska
12. Hundvåg

Hordaland 1

1. Frøya – promoted
2. Loddefjord
3. Arna-Bjørnar
4. Sandviken 2
5. Osterøy
6. Flaktveit
7. Bjarg 2
8. Fana 2
9. BI Athletics
10. Trott
11. Olsvik

- Mathopen – pulled team

Hordaland 2

1. Bergensdalen – promoted
2. Lyngbø
3. Nest-Sotra
4. Nordhordland
5. Sotra 2
6. Sund
7. Djerv
8. Nymark
9. NHHI
10. Os 2
11. Baune
12. Odda

Sogn og Fjordane

1. Fjøra – promoted
2. Stryn
3. Eid
4. Høyang
5. Årdal
6. Florø
7. Jølster
8. Førde 2
9. Kaupanger
10. Sandane
11. Dale
12. Måløy

Sunnmøre

1. Stordal – lost playoff
2. Hareid
3. Rollon
4. Hødd 2
5. Bergsøy
6. Brattvåg 2
7. Ørsta
8. Ravn
9. Hovdebygda
10. Spjelkavik 2
11. Valder
12. Langevåg

Nordmøre og Romsdal

1. Kristiansund 2 – won playoff
2. Elnesvågen
3. Midsund
4. Træff 2
5. Clausenengen
6. Surnadal
7. Eide og Omegn
8. Åndalsnes
9. Averøykameratene
10. Dahle
11. Sunndal
12. Smøla/Aure

Trøndelag 1

1. Nationalkameratene – promoted
2. Freidig
3. Steinkjer
4. Sverresborg
5. Strindheim 2
6. Malvik
7. Vuku
8. Verdal
9. Levanger 2
10. Egge
11. Tiller
12. Rørvik

Trøndelag 2

1. Tynset – promoted
2. Lade
3. Rindal
4. Trønder-Lyn
5. Kolstad
6. Orkanger
7. Lånke
8. Stjørdals-Blink 2
9. Heimdal
10. Nardo 2
11. Rennebu
12. Hitra/Frøya

Nordland

1. Stålkameratene – rescinded promotion
2. Bodø/Glimt 2
3. Sandnessjøen
4. Junkeren 2
5. Innstranda
6. Mosjøen
7. Rana 2
8. Grand Bodø
9. Tverlandet
10. Brønnøysund

Hålogaland

1. Sortland – promoted
2. Mjølner
3. Melbo
4. Svolvær
5. Morild
6. Skånland
7. Landsås
8. Harstad 2
9. Medkila

- Stokmarknes – pulled team

Troms

1. Skarp – promoted
2. Hamna
3. Senja
4. Tromsdalen 2
5. Stakkevollan
6. Mellembygd
7. Krokelvdalen
8. Fløya 2
9. Salangen
10. Storsteinnes
11. Kvaløya
12. Nordreisa

Finnmark

1. Bjørnevatn – promoted
2. Tverrelvdalen
3. Kirkenes
4. Talvik
5. Alta 2
6. Porsanger
7. Norild
8. HIF/Stein
9. Nordkinn

- Nordlys – pulled team

== Playoffs ==
- Flint beat Fredrikstad 2 3–1 on aggregate.
- Åssiden beat Urædd 5–3 on aggregate.
- Kristiansund 2 beat Stordal 1–0 on aggregate.
