= 2025 Norwegian Third Division =

Norwegian football season

Norwegian Third Division
- Season: 2025
- Champions: Junkeren; Trygg/Lade; Lørenskog; Bjarg; Vidar; Kvik Halden
- Promoted: Junkeren; Trygg/Lade; Lørenskog; Bjarg; Vidar; Kvik Halden
- Relegated: Funnefoss/Vormsund; Sortland; Alta 2 Kristiansund 2 Surnadal; Tiller; HamKam 2 Åssiden; Ullensaker/Kisa 2 Fjøra; Lyngbø; Loddefjord; Torvastad; Sola; Sandnes Ulf 2 Fredrikstad; Flint; Pors 2

The 2025 Norwegian Third Division (referred to as Norsk Tipping-ligaen for sponsorship reasons) is a fourth-tier Norwegian football league season. The league consisted of 84 teams divided into 6 groups of 14 teams each. The season started on 29 March 2025 and is scheduled to end on 26 October 2025. The league is played as a double round-robin tournament, where all teams play 26 matches.

== League tables ==
=== Group 1 ===
Pos	Team	Pld	W	D	L	GF	GA	GD	Pts	Promotion or relegation
1	Junkeren (C, P)	26	22	3	1	89	31	+58	69	Promotion to Second Division
2	Frigg	26	19	3	4	91	41	+50	60	
3	Bærum	26	15	4	7	77	41	+36	49	
4	Gamle Oslo	26	11	7	8	68	48	+20	40	
5	Tromsø 2	26	12	4	10	58	47	+11	40	
6	Ullern	26	12	3	11	64	55	+9	39	
7	Fløya	26	11	2	13	63	58	+5	35	
8	Ulfstind	26	11	2	13	46	58	−12	35	
9	KFUM 2	26	8	8	10	44	50	−6	32	
10	Harstad	26	9	2	15	61	63	−2	29	
11	Skjervøy	26	8	5	13	44	86	−42	29	
12	Funnefoss/Vormsund (R)	26	5	10	11	45	65	−20	25	Relegation to Fourth Division
13	Sortland (R)	26	5	4	17	33	91	−58	19	Relegation to Fourth Division
14	Alta 2 (R)	26	4	3	19	44	93	−49	15	Relegation to Fourth Division

Source: NFF (in Norwegian)
Rules for classification: 1) Points; 2) Goal difference; 3) Goals scored; 4) Head-to-head points; 5) Head-to-head goal difference; 6) Head-to-head goals scored.
(C) Champions; (P) Promoted; (R) Relegated

=== Group 2 ===
Pos	Team	Pld	W	D	L	GF	GA	GD	Pts	Promotion or relegation
1	Trygg/Lade (C, P)	26	20	4	2	73	22	+51	64	Promotion to Second Division
2	Melhus	26	18	3	5	69	33	+36	57	
3	Volda	26	16	5	5	71	37	+34	53	
4	Spjelkavik	26	15	6	5	69	37	+32	51	
5	Rosenborg 2	26	15	4	7	63	39	+24	49	
6	Aalesunds 2	26	12	2	12	54	66	−12	38	
7	Nardo	26	10	7	9	51	43	+8	37	
8	Byåsen	26	9	8	9	40	41	−1	35	
9	Molde 2	26	10	1	15	63	76	−13	31	
10	Ranheim 2	26	8	5	13	56	60	−4	29	
11	Kvik	26	6	9	11	40	48	−8	27	
12	Kristiansund 2 (R)	26	3	9	14	20	59	−39	18	Relegation to Fourth Division
13	Surnadal (R)	26	2	7	17	35	89	−54	13	Relegation to Fourth Division
14	Tiller (R)	26	1	4	21	34	88	−54	7	Relegation to Fourth Division

Source: NFF (in Norwegian)
Rules for classification: 1) Points; 2) Goal difference; 3) Goals scored; 4) Head-to-head points; 5) Head-to-head goal difference; 6) Head-to-head goals scored.
(C) Champions; (P) Promoted; (R) Relegated

=== Group 3 ===
Pos	Team	Pld	W	D	L	GF	GA	GD	Pts	Promotion or relegation
1	Lørenskog (C, P)	26	20	2	4	82	24	+58	62	Promotion to Second Division
2	Elverum	26	19	1	6	85	29	+56	58	
3	Gjøvik-Lyn	26	17	7	2	61	20	+41	58	
4	Lillehammer	26	14	6	6	48	44	+4	48	
5	Nordstrand	26	14	2	10	66	53	+13	44	
6	Skjetten	26	12	5	9	56	46	+10	41	
7	Kongsvinger 2	26	12	2	12	58	63	−5	38	
8	Lillestrøm 2	26	11	2	13	60	65	−5	35	
9	Skedsmo	26	11	1	14	51	56	−5	34	
10	Strømsgodset 2	26	9	2	15	52	78	−26	29	
11	Bjørkelangen	26	8	4	14	37	54	−17	28	
12	HamKam 2 (R)	26	8	0	18	48	56	−8	24	Relegation to Fourth Division
13	Åssiden (R)	26	5	3	18	45	70	−25	18	Relegation to Fourth Division
14	Ullensaker/Kisa 2 (R)	26	3	1	22	30	121	−91	10	Relegation to Fourth Division

Source: NFF (in Norwegian)
Rules for classification: 1) Points; 2) Goal difference; 3) Goals scored; 4) Head-to-head points; 5) Head-to-head goal difference; 6) Head-to-head goals scored.
(C) Champions; (P) Promoted; (R) Relegated

=== Group 4 ===
Pos	Team	Pld	W	D	L	GF	GA	GD	Pts	Promotion or relegation
1	Bjarg (C, P)	26	24	1	1	92	20	+72	73	Promotion to Second Division
2	Førde	26	16	5	5	75	41	+34	53	
3	Fana	26	15	6	5	79	47	+32	51	
4	Os	26	14	2	10	85	46	+39	44	
5	Fyllingsdalen	26	13	1	12	50	61	−11	40	
6	Sandefjord 2	26	12	2	12	57	70	−13	38	
7	Gneist	26	9	7	10	56	55	+1	34	
8	Askøy	26	9	6	11	44	52	−8	33	
9	Vålerenga 2	26	10	1	15	63	65	−2	31	
10	Åsane 2	26	9	3	14	52	78	−26	30	
11	Lyn 2	26	8	4	14	53	68	−15	28	
12	Fjøra (R)	26	8	3	15	49	79	−30	27	Relegation to Fourth Division
13	Lyngbø (R)	26	6	4	16	39	58	−19	22	Relegation to Fourth Division
14	Loddefjord (R)	26	5	3	18	42	96	−54	18	Relegation to Fourth Division

Source: NFF (in Norwegian)
Rules for classification: 1) Points; 2) Goal difference; 3) Goals scored; 4) Head-to-head points; 5) Head-to-head goal difference; 6) Head-to-head goals scored.
(C) Champions; (P) Promoted; (R) Relegated

=== Group 5 ===
Pos	Team	Pld	W	D	L	GF	GA	GD	Pts	Promotion or relegation
1	Vidar (C, P)	26	19	1	6	96	34	+62	58	Promotion to Second Division
2	Vindbjart	26	17	4	5	74	38	+36	55	
3	Djerv 1919	26	16	2	8	62	37	+25	50	
4	Viking 2	26	15	2	9	58	47	+11	47	
5	Madla	26	13	7	6	60	42	+18	46	
6	Brodd	26	13	3	10	60	54	+6	42	
7	Stord	26	11	7	8	57	54	+3	40	
8	Våg	26	11	5	10	66	62	+4	38	
9	Hinna	26	11	2	13	62	53	+9	35	
10	Staal Jørpeland	26	9	2	15	60	73	−13	29	
11	Haugesund 2	26	9	2	15	41	61	−20	29	
12	Torvastad (R)	26	7	4	15	29	68	−39	25	Relegation to Fourth Division
13	Sola (R)	26	6	4	16	38	87	−49	22	Relegation to Fourth Division
14	Sandnes Ulf 2 (R)	26	2	1	23	32	85	−53	7	Relegation to Fourth Division

Source: NFF (in Norwegian)
Rules for classification: 1) Points; 2) Goal difference; 3) Goals scored; 4) Head-to-head points; 5) Head-to-head goal difference; 6) Head-to-head goals scored.
(C) Champions; (P) Promoted; (R) Relegated

=== Group 6 ===
Pos	Team	Pld	W	D	L	GF	GA	GD	Pts	Promotion or relegation
1	Kvik Halden (C, P)	26	21	3	2	87	25	+62	66	Promotion to Second Division
2	Fram Larvik	26	16	3	7	64	39	+25	51	
3	Ørn Horten	26	14	3	9	51	38	+13	45	
4	Lokomotiv Oslo	26	12	7	7	52	45	+7	43	
5	Grei	26	13	3	10	66	51	+15	42	
6	Oppsal	26	10	6	10	42	48	−6	36	
7	Odd 2	26	11	1	14	59	47	+12	34	
8	Stabæk 2	26	10	4	12	49	55	−6	34	
9	Drøbak-Frogn	26	8	10	8	46	52	−6	34	
10	Sarpsborg 08 2	26	9	5	12	45	46	−1	32	
11	Ready	26	9	3	14	50	59	−9	30	
12	Fredrikstad 2 (R)	26	9	2	15	49	69	−20	29	Relegation to Fourth Division
13	Flint (R)	26	7	4	15	43	65	−22	25	Relegation to Fourth Division
14	Pors 2 (R)	26	4	4	18	29	93	−64	16	Relegation to Fourth Division

Source: NFF (in Norwegian)
Rules for classification: 1) Points; 2) Goal difference; 3) Goals scored; 4) Head-to-head points; 5) Head-to-head goal difference; 6) Head-to-head goals scored.
(C) Champions; (P) Promoted; (R) Relegated
