= Kasper Andersen =

Kasper Andersen may refer to:

- Kasper Andersen (cyclist) (born 2002), Danish cyclist
- Kasper Andersen (speedway rider) (born 1998), Danish speedway rider
- Kasper Irming Andersen (born 1986), Danish handball player
