= Erik Ingebrethsen =

Norwegian footballer (born 2007)

Personal information
- Full name: Erik Elias Frøland Ingebrethsen
- Date of birth: 8 January 2007 (age 19)
- Height: 1.94 m (6 ft 4 in)
- Position: Striker

Team information
- Current team: Strømsgodset
- Number: 23

Youth career
- 2020–2021: Madla
- 2021–2025: Viking
- 2025–2026: Sporting CP

Senior career*
Years	Team	Apps	(Gls)
2026–	Strømsgodset 2	1	(1)
2026–	Strømsgodset	6	(1)
- * Club domestic league appearances and goals as of 20 November 2026

Erik Elias Frøland Ingebrethsen (born 8 January 2007) is a Norwegian professional footballer who plays as a striker for Norwegian First Division club Strømsgodset.

== Club career ==
=== Early career ===
Ingebrethsen played youth football for Madla before joining the academy of Viking in 2021. He progressed through Viking's youth teams, scoring 17 goals in 17 appearances in the national under-17 league during the 2024 season, helping his team win the championship.

In January 2025, he moved to Portuguese club Sporting CP, joining their under-19 team in Lisbon. The transfer attracted coverage in both the Norwegian and Portuguese sports press.

In March 2025, Stavanger Aftenblad published an in-depth profile of Ingebrethsen following his move to Portugal.

He subsequently represented Sporting at youth level. After approximately eighteen months in Portugal, Ingebrethsen terminated his contract with the club in July 2026, becoming a free agent.

=== Strømsgodset ===
On 13 August 2026, Ingebrethsen signed a contract with Strømsgodset until the end of the 2028 season. He was assigned the number 23 shirt.

He made his first-team debut on 24 August 2026, coming on as a substitute in a 6–0 victory over Modum in the first round of the Norwegian Football Cup.

He scored his first goal for Strømsgodset in a 4–1 away victory over Asker in the second round of the Norwegian Football Cup on 8 September 2026, opening the scoring in his first start for the club.

Ingebrethsen subsequently made his Norwegian First Division debut in a 4–1 home victory over Sandnes Ulf, scoring his first league goal for Strømsgodset. He finished the 2026 season with six league appearances and one goal.

== Career statistics ==
As of 20 November 2026

Appearances and goals by club, season and competition
Club	Season	League		
Club	Season	Division	Apps	Goals
Strømsgodset 2	2026	3. divisjon	1	1
Total			1	1
Strømsgodset	2026	1. divisjon	6	1
Total			6	1
Career total			7	2
