= IK Junkeren =

Norwegian sports club

- Full name: Idrettsklubben Junkeren
- Founded: 1958
- Ground: Nordlandshallen
- Manager: Thor Mikalsen
- League: 2. divisjon
- 2026: 2. divisjon group 2, 9th of 14
Home colours	Away colours

Idrettsklubben Junkeren ("Junkeren" means "The Junker") is a Norwegian sports club from Bodø, Nordland. It has sections for association football and team handball.

The women's handball team played in the highest Norwegian league in the 1990s.

The men's football team played in the Norwegian Second Division, the third tier of the Norwegian football league system, in 2023 and 2024. The club has played in the Norwegian Third Division from 2004 to 2006, from 2011 to 2022 and from 2025.

== Recent history ==
Season		Pos.	Pl.	W	D	L	GS	GA	P	Cup	Notes
2005	3. divisjon	6	20	8	2	10	41	59	26	1st qualifying round	
2006	3. divisjon	↓ 11	22	5	2	15	44	90	17	1st qualifying round	Relegated to 4. divisjon
2007	4. divisjon	8	14	2	1	11	28	54	7	Not Qualified	
2008	4. divisjon	8	16	3	2	11	40	50	11	Not Qualified	
2009	4. divisjon	3	16	9	2	5	69	32	26	Not Qualified	
2010	4. divisjon	↑ 1	18	16	1	1	93	27	49	Not Qualified	Promoted to 3. divisjon
2011	3. divisjon	12	22	3	2	17	22	73	11	2nd qualifying round	
2012	3. divisjon	11	22	5	3	14	34	63	18	2nd qualifying round	
2013	3. divisjon	11	22	6	4	12	36	57	22	1st round	
2014	3. divisjon	3	22	14	4	4	59	31	46	2nd qualifying round	
2015	3. divisjon	7	22	11	2	9	47	43	35	2nd qualifying round	
2016	3. divisjon	2	22	13	5	4	49	36	44	1st round	
2017	3. divisjon	4	26	11	6	9	61	59	39	2nd qualifying round	
2018	3. divisjon	5	26	13	7	6	76	42	46	2nd round	
2019	3. divisjon	7	26	12	3	11	69	56	39	1st round	
2020	Season cancelled										
2021	3. divisjon	3	13	6	4	3	33	22	22	2nd round	
2022	3. divisjon	↑ 1	26	23	3	0	86	24	72	2nd round	Promoted to 2. divisjon
2023	2. divisjon	10	26	6	9	10	40	54	27	2nd round	
2024	2. divisjon	↓ 12	26	7	2	17	41	70	23	2nd round	Relegated to 3. divisjon
2025	3. divisjon	↑ 1	26	22	3	1	89	31	69	2nd round	Promoted to 2. divisjon
2026	2. divisjon	9	26	10	4	12	39	47	34	2nd round	

== Current squad ==
As of 1 September 2026. Note: Flags indicate national team as defined under FIFA eligibility rules; some limited exceptions apply. Players may hold more than one non-FIFA nationality.

No.	Pos.	Nation	Player
1	GK	NOR	Bastian Hanssen
3	DF	NOR	Håkon Elias Myrseth
5	DF	NOR	Jørgen Lamark
6	DF	NOR	Isak Strand
7	DF	NOR	Eskil Melstein
9	FW	NOR	Per Kristian Hildre
10	MF	NOR	Sidad Najah Chooly
11	FW	NOR	Isak Hammadou
14	MF	NOR	Benjamin Selvik
15	MF	NOR	Adan Hussein
16	FW	NOR	Sverre Sivertsen
17	MF	NOR	Alexander Winther Jakobsen
18	MF	NOR	Isak Helbostad

No.	Pos.	Nation	Player
20	MF	NOR	Jonas Skårn-Johansen
21	MF	NOR	Isak Wiik Lekang
22	MF	NOR	Sondre Solhaug
23	GK	NOR	Michael Tobias Andersen
27	MF	NOR	Kwame Rasch Moyo
29	MF	NOR	Tobias Rengård
30	FW	NOR	Jonas Ringstad Skottvoll
37	DF	NOR	Magnus Fagervik Antonsen
60	FW	NOR	Ivar Unhjem
77	FW	NOR	Mads Fagerli Halsøy
91	GK	NOR	Jonas Finseth
92	FW	NOR	Teodor Kristiansen
99	DF	NOR	Torje Fabian Skårn-Johansen
