= Victor Dedes =

Danish footballer (born 2003)

Personal information
- Date of birth: 20 March 2003 (age 23)
- Place of birth: Denmark
- Height: 1.81 m (5 ft 11 in)
- Position: Left-back

Team information
- Current team: Strømsgodset

Youth career
- 2018–2021: FC Copenhagen
- 2021–2022: Hellerup IK

Senior career*
Years	Team	Apps	(Gls)
2022–2023	Hellerup IK	13	(0)
2023–2024	PEC Zwolle U21	17	(2)
2024–2025	Hellerup IK	24	(0)
2025–2026	Hillerød Fodbold	17	(3)
2026–	Strømsgodset	28	(3)
- * Club domestic league appearances and goals as of 20 November 2026

Victor Rosendahl Dedes (born 20 March 2003) is a Danish professional footballer who plays as a left-back for Norwegian club Strømsgodset.

== Early career ==
Dedes began his football development in the youth academy of Danish club FC Copenhagen. He subsequently joined Hellerup IK, where he progressed through the club's youth system before making his senior debut.

== Club career ==
Dedes progressed into senior football with Hellerup IK, making 24 first-team appearances before moving abroad. In 2023, he moved to the Netherlands to join PEC Zwolle, where he played for the club's under-21 team. Dedes was also involved with the senior squad. He returned to Hellerup IK in 2024, making 24 appearances during the 2024–25 season.

In June 2025, Dedes joined Danish club Hillerød Fodbold on a contract running until 2028. During the first half of the 2025–26 season, he scored three goals and provided three assists in league competition, attracting interest from Norwegian clubs.

On 17 January 2026, Dedes signed a four-year contract with Norwegian club Strømsgodset. The transfer reunited him with sporting director Jackie Rasmussen and assistant coach Jimmy Brinksby, with whom he had previously worked at Hillerød. In his first season, Strømsgodset won promotion to the 2027 Eliteserien. Dedes was selected for the Norwegian News Agency's Team of the Year.

== Personal life ==
Dedes has a Danish mother and a Greek father.

== Career statistics ==
As of 19 November 2026

Club appearances and goals
Club	Season	League	National cup	Total
Hellerup IK	2022–23	13	0	13
Hellerup IK	2024–25	24	0	24
PEC Zwolle U21	2023–24	17	2	17
Hillerød Fodbold	2025–26	17	1	18
Strømsgodset	2026	28	1	29
