= Aursmoen =

- Village
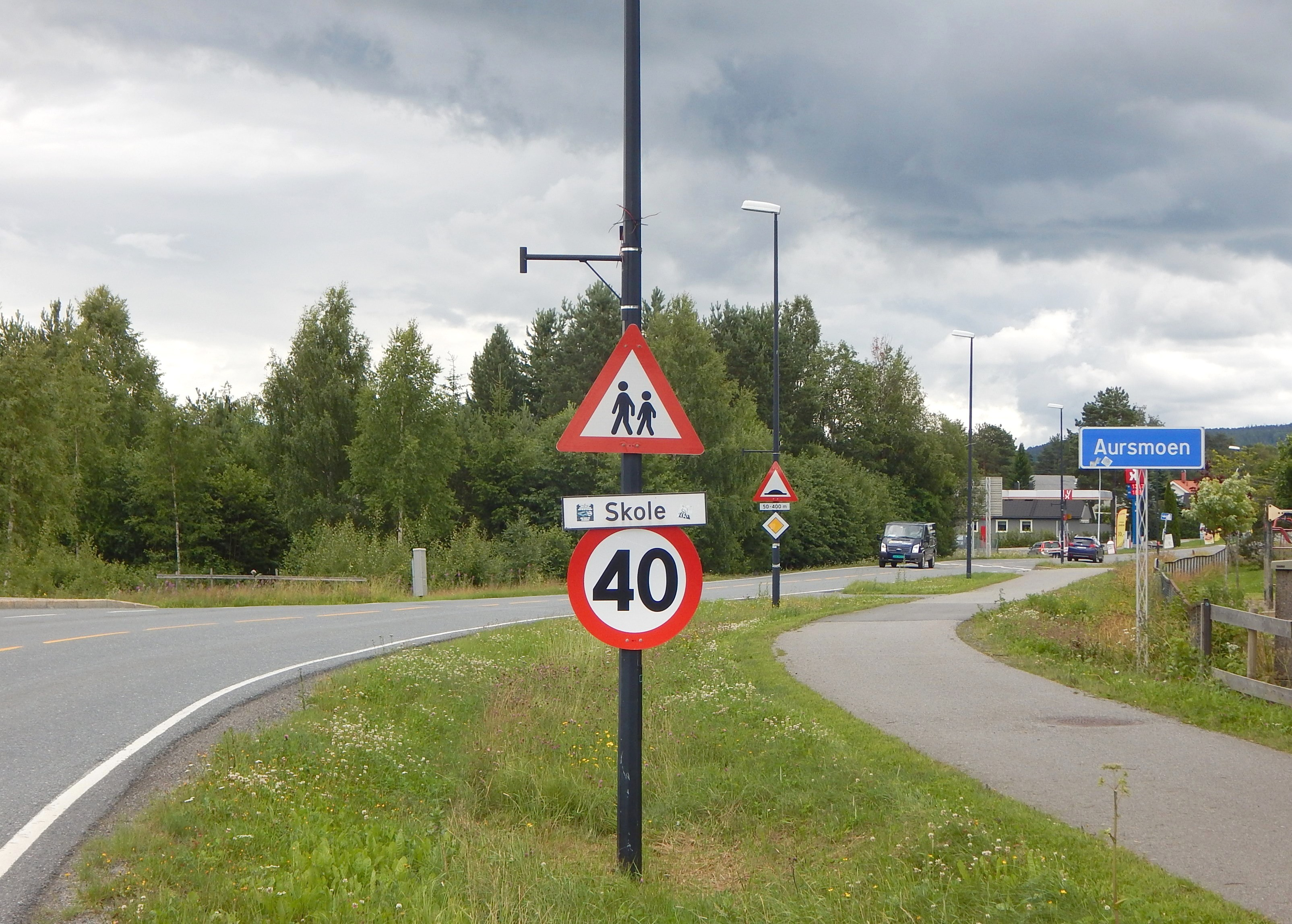

- Location in Akershus
- Coordinates: 59°55′29″N 11°26′51″E
- Country: Norway
- County: Akershus
- District: Romerike
- Municipality: Aurskog-Høland

Area
  - Total: 2.63 km^{2} (1.02 sq mi)

Population (2023)
  - Total: 3,564
- Time zone: UTC+1 (CET)
  - Summer (DST): UTC+2 (CEST)

Aursmoen is a village in the municipality of Aurskog-Høland, Norway. Its population was 3,564 as of 2023. It had 2,318 people in 2007.
