= Eidanger IL =

Norwegian football club

Eidanger
- Full name: Eidanger Idrettslag
- Founded: 4 November 1915
- Ground: Eidangerbanen, Porsgrunn
- League: Fourth Division
- 2025: 3rd

Eidanger Idrettslag is a Norwegian multi-sports club from Eidanger in Porsgrunn. It has sections for association football, athletics, gymnastics and cycling.

The club was founded as Nystrand IF on 4 November 1915. A multi-sports club from the start, in the period after World War II the club also had a locally successful section for bandy as well as team handball and Nordic skiing. The team colours are blue and white.

The men's football team currently plays in the Fourth Division, the fifth tier of football in Norway. The team reached the first round of the 2026–27 Norwegian Football Cup, but were thoroughly routed by Sandefjord Fotball. Eidanger lost 0–15 at home ground, which was an all-time record victory for Sandefjord.

The club currently fields no women's football team.
