= Åsane Arena =

Sports venue in Bergen, Norway

- Interactive map of Åsane Arena
- Former names: Arena Nord (2018–2020)
- Location: Åsane, Bergen, Vestland, Norway
- Coordinates: 60°28′11″N 5°18′53″E
- Owner: Trond Mohn; Åsane Allianseidrettslag
- Capacity: 2,220 (handball, volleyball); 3,300 (soccer)

Construction
- Groundbreaking: December 11, 2018; 7 years ago
- Opened: August 19, 2020; 6 years ago
- Cost: NOK 700 million

Tenants
- Åsane Håndball; Tertnes Håndball Elite; Åsane Fotball; Åsane Fotball Damer; Åsane Turn; Åsane Seahawks Cheerleading; Bergen Klatreklubb; TIF Viking Volleyball; Åsane Squashklubb; Salhus Turn & IL; Vågen Taekwondo Klubb; Tertnes Turn; Bergen Sandvolleyballklubb; Bergen Curling Club

Åsane Arena, formerly known as Arena Nord, is a multi-purpose arena located in Åsane borough, Bergen, Norway. It is a gift from billionaire businessman and philanthropist Trond Mohn to the sport. The arena consists of 6 different sports halls and a soccer stadium and has a total area of 32,000 m^{2}. Parts of the facility opened in August 2020, while the total facility was completed and opened in spring 2021.

== Usage ==
In addition to being a large arena for sporting activity and sporting pleasure, it is also arranged for top level sports within the various sports segments. The facility features good social meeting points where top and bottom can benefit from each other and where people interested in sports can meet for socializing. The arena houses its own café, where healthy and nutritious meals adapted to athletes are central.

The multi-purpose hall has space for 2,220 spectators and is used for matches for handball and volleyball teams, both on the women's and men's sides. In addition, tournaments are held for children and young people as well as national matches. The soccer stadium has a capacity of 3,300 spectators. Due to underfloor heating, the pitch will be usable all year round. Soccer at the highest level is played here for both men and women, and the facility is used for larger children's and youth events.

== Facilities ==
Åsane Arena is designed for approximately 20 different sports activities:

- The multi-purpose hall: handball, volleyball, basketball, badminton, floorball
- The gymnasium: gymnastics, rhythmic gymnastics, cheerleading
- The ice rinks: curling, ice hockey, short-track skating, figure skating
- The sand hall: beach volleyball, beach handball, beach soccer
- Other facilities: martial arts, climbing, squash, dance, soccer

== Café ==
The main caféteria is on the building's second floor and has around 100 seats. The cafe is open from 10 AM to 6 PM (Monday through Friday), but the opening hours can be adapted to events. A hot lunch is served, and in the afternoon you will be able to buy baguettes, dinner dishes or make use of the salad bar. Saturday and Sunday the opening hours are from 10 AM to 4 PM.

== Awards and recognitions ==
The arena has been recognized as one of the top arenas in the country. On October 16, 2021, the Norwegian Olympic and Paralympic Committee and Confederation of Sports awarded the climbing wall, named The West Wall (Norwegian: Vestveggen), the prize of being the sports facility of the year.

== See also ==
- List of indoor arenas in Norway
