= Pors Stadion =

Football stadium in Porsgrunn, Norway

- Interactive map of Pors Stadion
- Location: Stadionveien 4; 3917 Porsgrunn
- Coordinates: 59.1521°N 9.6428°E
- Capacity: 7,000
- Surface: Artificial turf

Construction
- Groundbreaking: 1931
- Opened: 1936

Tenant
- Pors Grenland (football)

Pors Stadion is the home stadium of the second division football team Pors Grenland. Pors Stadion is located on the westside of Porsgrunnselva river in Porsgrunn, an area locally termed "Vessia". There is grass on three sides of the field, and on the other side there are stands covering about 1,000 spectators.

Record attendance was 8,000 people during a game against Skeid on September 5, 1954. The venue has hosted Norway national under-21 football team matches twice, playing 1–1 against Denmark on 4 June 1980 and 0–0 against South Korea on 4 November 1995.
