= Daniel Job =

Nigerian footballer (born 2005)

Personal information
- Date of birth: 26 August 2005 (age 21)
- Place of birth: Nigeria
- Height: 5 ft 9 in (1.75 m)
- Position: Winger

Team information
- Current team: FC Dallas
- Number: 7

Youth career
- –2024: Future Pro

Senior career*
Years	Team	Apps	(Gls)
2024	→ Sarpsborg 08 2 (loan)	13	(8)
2024–2025	Sarpsborg 08	23	(2)
2025	→ Egersund (loan)	12	(3)
2026	Kongsvinger	19	(7)
2026–	FC Dallas	0	(0)
- * Club domestic league appearances and goals as of 2 September 2026

Daniel Job (born 26 August 2005) is a Nigerian footballer who plays as a winger for Major League Soccer club FC Dallas.

In 2024, he was loaned from Future Pro to Sarpsborg 08 in Norway. He had to start playing for the B team in the Third Division, but following 8 goals in 13 games, Sarpsborg 08 exercised their option to buy Job permanently and gave him a place in the first-team squad in July 2024. His new contract lasted until the end of 2028. He made his Eliteserien debut on the next day, on 20 July 2024. His first start came in August 2024 against Haugesund, whereupon he also scored his first Eliteserien goal.

Ahead of the 2025 season, he would need to improve his defensive work in order to continue his progress in Norway. To gain more playing time, Sarpsborg 08 decided to loan him to Egersund for the first half of 2025.

In February 2026, Job joined Kongsvinger as part of the deal that saw Noa Williams move to Sarpsborg 08. He quickly established himself in Kongsvinger's attack, recording seven goals and seven assists in 19 league appearances during the 2026 season.

On 2 September 2026, Job was transferred to Major League Soccer club FC Dallas. He signed a U22 Initiative contract through the 2029–30 MLS season, with a club option for the 2030–31 season. He joined Dallas after making 20 appearances in all competitions for Kongsvinger and scoring eight goals.
