= Gabriel Johnson =

American trumpeter

Gabriel Johnson (born 1980 in Santa Clara, California) is an American trumpeter whose music combines aspects of electronica and jazz.

== Reception ==
Robert Christgau gave Fra_ctured an A− grade, writing that "[Johnson's] horn has crystallized more ace electronica experiments than any other traditional instrument," adding that "his sound and his backdrops are bigger and hotter than his predecessors'". David Luhrssen of the Shepherd Express wrote that the album "conjures switched-on '70s progressive rock along with percolating electro-funk and copy-and-paste Pro Tools jazz," and wrote that Johnson was "obviously in the school" of Miles Davis. Andrew Frey in reviewing the album for Maximum Ink wrote of Johnson: "Born on the whims and whimsy of quirky electronica, this phenom trumpeter has found liberating fields of instrumental bliss through jubilant Pro Tools antics and his own 'fractured jazz' notions." Tom Hull of The Village Voice described the album as "Bold swathes of soundtrack electronica, burnished with bolts of trumpet."

== Discography ==
- Fra_ctured (Electrofone, 2010)
- Introducing Gabriel Johnson (Sunset Horn, 2012)
- Alone Together (Sunset Horn, 2014)
- Sketches Volume 1 (Sunset Horn, 2016)
- Sketches Volume 2 (Sunset Horn, 2016)
- Sketches Volume 3 (Sunset Horn, 2016)
- Sketches Volume 4 (Sunset Horn, 2016)
- Winter Beats (Sunset Horn, 2022)
- Sunset 08 (Sunset Horn, 2022)
- Silent One (Sunset Horn, 2022)
- Quarantine Moonshine (Sunset Horn, 2022)
- Monterey Mysterey (Sunset Horn, 2022)
- Blur (Sunset Horn, 2022)
- Night Music Volume 1 (Sunset Horn, 2022)
- Film Music Volume 1 (Sunset Horn, 2022)
- Mulholland (Sunset Horn, 2022)
- Sunday Sessions-Volume 1 (Sunset Horn, 2022)
- Sunday Sessions-Volume 2 (Sunset Horn, 2022)
- Sunday Sessions-Volume 3 (Sunset Horn, 2022)
