= Frøya IL =

Association football club in Norway

- Full name: Frøya Idrettslag
- Founded: 26 June 1928; 98 years ago
- Ground: Frøya Idrettspark, Bergen
- League: Third Division
- 2026: 1st (Fourth Division)
- Website: http://www.froya-idrett.no

Frøya Idrettslag is a Norwegian sports club based in Laksevåg, Bergen. Founded in 1928, it has sections for association football and basketball. The club's colours are orange and yellow.

== Football ==
The football section, Frøya Fotball, played in the Norwegian Third Division in 2001, 2004–2008 and 2014. It plays its home matches at Frøya Idrettspark. In 2021, they won promotion back to the Third Division. Relegated in 2024, they moved back up in 2026.
