= IL Bjarg =

Norwegian sports club

- Full name: Idrettslaget Bjarg
- Founded: 1947
- Ground: Stavollen Kunstgress; Bergen
- Capacity: 1,200
- League: Third Division
- 2025: Third Division group 1, 1st of 14 (promoted)
Home colours	Away colours

Idrettslaget Bjarg is a sports club in Stavollen, Bergen not far from Bergen Flesland Airport. It supports football, handball, athletics, and gymnastics. The football team will play in the 2. divisjon in 2026, the third tier in the Norwegian football league system after achieving promotion from the 3. divisjon in the 2025 season.

== Football team, recent history ==
=== Men's team ===
Season		Pos.	Pl.	W	D	L	GS	GA	P	Cup	Notes
2004	5. divisjon, Hordaland section 1	↑ 2	22	15	2	5	80	46	47		Promoted
2005	4. divisjon, Hordaland section 1	8	22	7	4	11	44	47	25		
2006	4. divisjon, Hordaland section 2	5	22	10	4	8	55	49	34		
2007	4. divisjon, Hordaland section 1	3	24	12	5	7	56	36	41		
2008	4. divisjon, Hordaland section 2	↑ 2	22	15	4	3	51	32	49		Promoted
2009	3. divisjon, Hordaland section 2	7	22	7	7	8	33	38	28		
2010	3. divisjon, Hordaland section 1	5	22	10	3	9	37	32	33	1st qual. round	
2011	3. divisjon, section 8	2	26	14	3	9	59	40	45	2nd round	
2012	3. divisjon, section 7	8	26	11	4	11	44	47	37	1st round	
2013	3. divisjon, section 8	3	24	13	0	11	53	43	39	2nd qual. round	
2014	3. divisjon, section 7	4	26	11	9	6	58	45	42	1st round	
2015	3. divisjon, section 7	9	26	8	4	14	47	58	28	1st qual. round	
2016	3. divisjon, section 7	↓ 5	24	12	4	8	56	50	40	2nd qual. round	Relegated
2017	4. divisjon, Hordaland section 1	4	22	9	6	7	47	41	33	1st round	
2018	4. divisjon, Hordaland section 2	7	22	9	3	10	46	37	30	1st qual. round	
2019	4. divisjon, Hordaland section 1	↑ 1	22	14	6	2	60	37	48	1st qual. round	Promoted
2020	Season cancelled										
2021	3. divisjon, section 4	5	13	7	1	5	25	29	22	1st round	
2022	3. divisjon, section 3	6	26	12	5	9	47	44	41	2nd round	
2023	3. divisjon, section 3	3	26	17	1	8	60	40	52	1st round	
2024	3. divisjon, section 1	2	26	22	2	2	86	27	68	2nd round	
2025	3. divisjon, section 4	↑ 1	26	24	1	1	92	20	73	2nd round	Promoted
2026	2.divisjon, section 1	↑ 2	26	17	3	6	60	29	54	4th round ^{1}	Promotion playoff
2026	Obos-liga playoff round 1	won	2	2	0	0	5	2	6	n/a	Promotion playoff
2026	Obos-liga playoff round 2									n/a	

Top goalscorer 2026

goals scored
Axel Ahlander	13
Jacob Jørgensen	12
Markus Eiane	9

- ^{1} Cup is still ongoing
