= List of Eliteserien venues =

The Eliteserien is the top association football league in Norway. It was established in 1963 as the 1. divisjon and has consisted of between 10 and 16 teams. Fifty-six different venues have been used to host matches.

== Current ==
The following is a list of all stadia used for matches in the Norwegian top division, including while it was known as the 1. divisjon. It consists of the venue's name, the municipality it where it is located, its current capacity, whether it has natural grass or artificial turf (an asterisk (*) indicates current artificial turf, but previous natural grass), the number of top-league matches contested on the venue, the teams which have played their home games at the venue and how many matches for each team, and the years the stadium was used at the top level. The data is up to date as of the end of the 2025 season.

**Bold**	Stadiums are used in the 2026 Eliteserien.
Italics	Stadiums are demolished and do not exist anymore.
*	Natural grass turf in the past.

As of end of 2025 season

List of Eliteserien stadiums
Name	Location	Capacity	Surface	Matches	Tenant(s)	Year(s)	Ref(s)
**Lerkendal Stadion**	Trondheim	21,421	Natural	747	Rosenborg (723), Strindheim (24) (Note: Strindheim played at Lerkendal in 1984 and 1995)	1967–77, 1979–	
Ullevaal Stadion	Oslo	25,572	Natural	697	Vålerenga (294), (Note: Vålerenga had Ullevaal as their main home ground in 1994–1996 and from 2000 until 14 August 2017, although they prior to that often had a minority of their home games at Ullevaal, and were not in the top league in 2001) Lyn (267), (Note: Lyn has had Ullevaal has it main home venue, and has played in the top league in 1963–69, 1971–73, 1978, 1980–81, 1991–93, 1997, 2001–09) Skeid (114), Frigg (18), Stabæk (3), (Note: Stabæk played three matches at Ullevaal in 2010 while Telenor Arena was being used for the 2010 Eurovision Song Contest.) Rosenborg (1) (Note: Rosenborg played one match at Ullevaal in 1971 due to severe rain fall ruining the pitch at their home ground Lerkendal Stadion ahead of the last home match against Strømsgodset.)	1963–75, 1977–2017	
**Brann Stadion**	Bergen	17,049	Natural	680	Brann	1963–64, 1968–79, 1981, 1983, 1985, 1987–2014, 2016–21, 2023–	
**Åråsen Stadion**	Lillestrøm	12,250	Natural	638	Lillestrøm (637), Strømmen (1) (Note: Strømmen played one match at Åråsen in 1986)	1975–2019, 2021–24, 2026–	
Marienlyst Stadion (Note: The turf has been artificial since the start of the 2008 season.)	Drammen	8,935	Artificial*	471	Strømsgodset	1967–76, 1990–91, 1994, 1996–99, 2001, 2007–25	
**Romssa Arena** (Note: Romssa Arena was known as Alfheim Stadion until 2023. For sponsorship reasons, the stadium is named after the Northern Sámi name for Tromsø by power company Troms Kraft. The turf has been artificial since the start of the summer of 2006.)	Tromsø	7,599	Artificial*	436	Tromsø	1986–2001, 2003–13, 2015–19, 2021–	
Stavanger Stadion	Stavanger	17,555	Natural	411	Viking	1963–65, 1968–86, 1989–2003	
Skagerak Arena (Note: Skagerak Arena was known as Odd Stadion until 2007. For sponsorship reasons, the stadium is named for the power company Skagerak Energi. The turf has been artificial since the start of the 2007 season.)	Skien	13,000	Artificial*	401	Odd	1965–67, 1999–2007, 2009–24	
**Aspmyra Stadion** (Note: The turf has been artificial since May 2006.)	Bodø	5,635	Artificial*	400	Bodø/Glimt	1977–80, 1993–2005, 2008–09, 2014–16, 2018–	
**Aker Stadion** (Note: Aker Stadion was known as Molde Stadion until 3 May 2006. For sponsorship reasons, the stadium is named for the industrial conglomerate Aker. The turf has been artificial since the start of the 2014 season.)	Molde	11,249	Artificial*	397	Molde (395), Kristiansund (2) (Note: Kristiansund played two matches at Aker Stadion in 2024 due to a storm damaging the pitch at their home ground Nordmøre Stadion while it was being resurfaced.)	1998–2006, 2008–	
Bislett Stadion	Oslo	15,400	Natural	376	Vålerenga (231), (Note: Vålerenga had Bislett as their main home stadium until 1993 and in 1998–99. In this period, they played in the top league in 1963–67, 1974–75, 1977–90 and 1998–99.) Skeid (62), Frigg (56), Lyn (25), Stabæk (2)	1963–75, 1977–99	
Kristiansand Stadion	Kristiansand	16,600	Natural	322	Start	1969, 1973–87, 1989–96, 2000, 2002, 2005–06	
Nadderud Stadion (Note: The pitch has been artificial since August 2023.)	Bærum	4,938	Artificial*	317	Stabæk	1995–2004, 2006–08, 2012, 2014–21, 2023	
**Sarpsborg Stadion** (Note: The turf has been artificial since 2009.)	Sarpsborg	8,022	Artificial*	313	Sarpsborg 08 (180), (Note: Sarpsborg 08 played at the top level in 2011 and 2013–) Sarpsborg FK (133)	1963–72, 1974, 2011, 2013–	
**Lyse Arena** (Note: For sponsorship reasons, the stadium is named Lyse Arena. It was known as Viking Stadion until 2018. The turf has been artificial since 2018.)	Stavanger	15,900	Artificial*	305	Viking	2004–17, 2019–	
Haugesund Sparebank Arena (Note: For sponsorship reasons, the stadium is named Haugesund Sparebank Arena. It was known as Haugesund Stadion until 2021.)	Haugesund	8,754	Natural	301	Haugesund (279), Djerv 1919 (11), (Note: Djerv 1919 played at the top level in 1988) Vard Haugesund (11) (Note: Vard Haugesund played at the top level in 1976)	1976, 1988, 1997–98, 2000, 2010–25	
**Briskeby Stadion** (Note: The turf has been artificial since July 2011.)	Hamar	8,068	Artificial*	284	Hamarkameratene (283), Vålerenga (1) (Note: Vålerenga played one home match at Briskeby in 1984, a year Hamarkameratene was not in the top league)	1970–74, 1976–77, 1979, 1981–84, 1986–87, 1992–95, 2004–06, 2008, 2022–	
Fosshaugane Campus (Note: The turf has been artificial since 2012.)	Sogndalsfjøra	4,000	Artificial*	277	Sogndal	1982, 1988–89, 1991–92, 1994, 1997–98, 2001–04, 2011–14, 2016–17	
Molde Idrettspark (Note: Molde Idrettspark was known as Molde Stadion until 1998, when Aker Stadion opened and took the name Molde Stadion)	Molde	15,000	Natural	227	Molde	1974–78, 1980, 1982, 1984–93, 1995–97	
Melløs Stadion	Moss	10,085	Natural	220	Moss	1977–85, 1987–90, 1996, 1998–2002	
**Color Line Stadion** (Note: For sponsorship reasons, Color Line Stadium is named for the ferry operator Color Line.)	Ålesund	10,778	Artificial	219	Aalesund	2005, 2007–17, 2020, 2022–23, 2026–	
Gjemselund Stadion (Note: The turf has been artificial since 2009.)	Kongsvinger	5,000	Artificial*	212	Kongsvinger	1983–99, 2010	
Bryne Stadion	Bryne	8,200	Natural	211	Bryne	1976–88, 2000–03, 2025	
Consto Arena (Note: Consto Arena was named Nedre Eiker Stadion from 1950 until 2012 and Mjøndalen Stadion from 2012 until 2015. For sponsorship reasons, the stadium was named Isachsen Stadion for the Isachsen Group from 2016 until 2018. It has been named Consto Arena for the Consto AS from the 2019 season. The turf has been artificial since the start of the 2012 season.)	Mjøndalen	4,500	Artificial*	211	Mjøndalen (173), Strømsgodset (8) (Note: Strømsgodset played eight home games at Nedre Eiker Stadion in 1996, while Marienlyst was being renovated)	1972–77, 1979, 1982–83, 1985–87, 1992, 1996, 2015, 2019–21	
Old Fredrikstad Stadion (Note: Old Fredrikstad Stadion was known as Fredrikstad Stadion until 2007, when a new Fredrikstad Stadion opened.)	Fredrikstad	10,500	Natural	208	Fredrikstad	1963–73, 1975–76, 1981–82, 1984, 2004–06	
**Jotun Arena** (Note: For sponsorship reasons, Jotun Arena is named after chemical company Jotun. The pitch has been artificial since 2024.)	Sandefjord	6,582	Artificial*	178	Sandefjord	2007, 2009–10, 2015, 2017–18, 2020–	
**Sparebanken Norge Arena Kristiansand** (Note: For sponsorship reasons, the stadium is named for the bank Sparebanken Norge. The turf has been artificial since the summer of 2012.)	Kristiansand	14,448	Artificial*	163	Start	2007, 2009–11, 2013–16, 2018, 2020, 2026–	
**Nordmøre Stadion** (Note: Previously named Kristiansund Stadion. The pitch has been artificial since 2014.)	Kristiansund	4,444	Artificial*	118	Kristiansund	2017–22, 2024–	
**Intility Arena** (Note: For sponsorship reasons, Intility Arena is named for IT company Intility.)	Oslo	17,333	Artificial	113	Vålerenga (111), KFUM (2) (Note: KFUM Oslo played the first two home matches of the 2024 season at Intility Arena due to ongoing upgrades of KFUM Arena.)	2017–	
**Fredrikstad Stadion** (Note: The pitch has been artificial since 2014.)	Fredrikstad	12,560	Artificial*	102	Fredrikstad	2007–09, 2011–12, 2024–	
Høddvoll Stadion	Ulsteinvik	4,433	Natural	60	Hødd	1966, 1969–72, 1995	
Guldbergaunet Stadion	Steinkjer	0	Artificial*	47	Steinkjer	1963, 1965–67, 1978	
Aka Arena (Note: For sponsorship reasons, Aka Arena is named for the investment company Aka.)	Hønefoss	4,256	Artificial	45	Hønefoss	2010, 2012–13	
Sandnes Stadion	Sandnes	3,085	Natural	45	Sandnes Ulf	2012–14	
Telenor Arena (Note: For sponsorship reasons, Telenor Arena is named for the telecommunications company Telenor.)	Fornebu	15,000	Artificial	42	Stabæk	2009–11	
Tønsberg Gressbane	Tønsberg	3,600	Artificial*	33	Eik-Tønsberg	1983–85	
Raufoss Stadion	Raufoss	0	Natural	31	Raufoss	1964, 1973–74	
Extra Arena	Ranheim	3,000	Artificial	30	Ranheim	2018–19	
**KFUM Arena**	Oslo	3,300	Artificial	28	KFUM Oslo	2024–	
Narvik Stadion	Narvik	0	Artificial*	22	Mjølner	1972, 1989	
Strømmen Stadion	Skedsmo	1,800	Artificial*	22	Strømmen	1986, 1988	
Varden Amfi	Bergen	12,000	Artificial*	22	Fyllingen	1990, 1993	
Valhall Stadion	Tromsø	0	Natural	20	Tromsø	1986–87	
Storstadion	Sandefjord	7,000	Natural	20	Sandefjord	2006–07	
Sandefjord Stadion	Sandefjord	0	Natural	18	Sandefjord BK	1964–65	
Kråmyra Stadion	Ålesund	9,665	Natural	13	Aalesund	2003	
Voldsløkka Stadion	Oslo	4,000	Natural	12	Skeid	1999	
Krohnsminde	Bergen	0	Artificial*	11	Fyllingen	1991	
Kuventræ Stadion	Osøyro	0	Artificial*	11	Os	1975	
Sakkestadbanen	Haugesund	0	Artificial*	11	Haugar	1981	
Gjøvik Stadion	Gjøvik	0	Artificial*	9	Gjøvik/Lyn	1963	
Lisleby Stadion	Fredrikstad	0	Artificial*	9	Lisleby	1966	
Pors Stadion	Porsgrunn	7,000	Artificial*	9	Pors	1970	
Nordlandshallen	Bodø	5,500	Artificial	2	Bodø/Glimt	1993, 1997	
Tromsdalen Stadion	Tromsø	3,000	Artificial*	2	Tromsø	1998–99	
Aurland Stadion	Aurlandsvangen	0	Natural	1	Sogndal	1998	
Grue Stadion	Kirkenær	0	Artificial*	1	Kongsvinger	1990	

== See also ==
- List of football stadiums in Norway
