= List of football stadiums in Norway =

Sporting venues in Norway

The following is a list of football stadiums in Norway, ranked in order of capacity, with the minimum capacity being 1,000.

Note that some stadiums used for lower-division football might have their capacity reduced if they were to be used in higher divisions, where higher standards could be required. For instance, only few arenas in lower divisions are all-seater stadiums. Moreover, as capacity crowds are rarely an issue in lower divisions, some of the figures are likely to be rough estimates.

== Current stadiums ==
#	Image	Stadium	Capacity	City	Home team	Division
1		Ullevaal Stadion	28,000	Oslo	Norway national football team	
2		Lerkendal Stadion	21,423	Trondheim	Rosenborg	Eliteserien
3		Brann Stadion	17,500	Bergen	Brann	Eliteserien
4		Intility Arena	16,550	Oslo	Vålerenga; Vålerenga (women)	1. divisjon Toppserien
5		Viking Stadion	16,300	Stavanger	Viking	Eliteserien
6		Bislett Stadion	15,400	Oslo	Lyn	1. divisjon
7		Sør Arena	14,448	Kristiansand	Start	1. divisjon
8		Fredrikstad Stadion	12,560	Fredrikstad	Fredrikstad	Eliteserien
9		Skagerak Arena	11,767	Skien	Odd	Eliteserien
10		Aker Stadion	11,249	Molde	Molde FK (men); Molde FK (women)	Eliteserien; 2. divisjon
11		Color Line Stadion	10,778	Ålesund	Aalesunds FK	1. divisjon
12		Åråsen Stadion	10,540	Lillestrøm	Lillestrøm	Eliteserien
13		Marienlyst Stadion	8,935	Drammen	Strømsgodset	Eliteserien
14		Haugesund Stadion	8,800	Haugesund	Haugesund	Eliteserien
15		Aspmyra Stadion	8,200	Bodø	Bodø/Glimt	Eliteserien
16		Briskeby Stadion	8,068	Hamar	Hamarkameratene	Eliteserien
17		Sarpsborg Stadion	8,022	Sarpsborg	Sarpsborg 08	Eliteserien
18		Romssa Arena	6,691	Tromsø	Tromsø IL	Eliteserien
19		Jotun Arena	6,582	Sandefjord	Sandefjord Fotball	Eliteserien
20		Øster Hus Arena	6,046	Sandnes	Sandnes Ulf	1. divisjon
21		Gjemselund Stadion	5,824	Kongsvinger	KIL Toppfotball	1. divisjon
22		Fosshaugane Campus	5,622	Sogndalsfjøra	Sogndal Fotball	1. divisjon
23		Nordlandshallen	5,500	Bodø	IK Junkeren	2. divisjon
24		Nadderud Stadion	4,938	Bærum	Stabæk (men); Stabæk (women)	1. divisjon Toppserien
25		Nordmøre Stadion	4,444	Kristiansund	Kristiansund BK	Eliteserien
26		Bryne Stadion	4,200	Bryne	Bryne FK	1. divisjon
27		Consto Arena	4,200	Mjøndalen	Mjøndalen IF	1. divisjon
28		Nye Høddvoll	4,081	Ulsteinvik	Hødd	2. divisjon
29		Halden Stadion	4,000	Halden	Kvik Halden	2. divisjon
30		Frogner Stadion	c. 4,000	Oslo	Frigg Oslo	3. divisjon
31		Sandnes Idrettspark	3,850	Sandnes		
32		Tønsberg Gressbane	3,820	Tønsberg	FK Eik Tønsberg	2. divisjon
33		Åsane Arena	3,700	Bergen	Åsane	1. divisjon
34		AKA Arena	3,633	Hønefoss	Hønefoss BK	3. divisjon
35		Varden Amfi	3,500	Bergen	Fyllingsdalen	3. divisjon
36		KFUM Arena	3,300	Oslo	KFUM-Kameratene Oslo	Eliteserien
37		Melløs Stadion	3,170	Moss	Moss FK	1. divisjon
38		Vallhall Arena	c. 3,000	Oslo		
39		Optime Arena	3,000	Notodden	Notodden FK	2. divisjon
40		Jessheim Stadion	c. 3,000	Jessheim	Ullensaker/Kisa	2. divisjon
41		Extra Arena	3,000	Trondheim	Ranheim	1. divisjon
42		J.J. Ugland Stadion – Levermyr	c. 3,000	Grimstad	Jerv; Amazon Grimstad (Women)	2. divisjon 2. divisjon
43		Guldbergaunet Stadion	c. 2,500	Steinkjer	Steinkjer FK	4. divisjon
44		Sveum Idrettspark	c. 2,500	Brumunddal	Brumunddal Fotball	3. divisjon
45		Narvik Stadion	c. 2,500	Narvik	Mjølner	3. divisjon
46		Tobb Arena Levanger	2,400	Levanger	Levanger FK	1. divisjon
47		Framparken	c. 2,000	Larvik	Fram Larvik	3. divisjon
48		Atlanten Stadion	c. 2,000	Kristiansund		
49		Rolvsrud Stadion	c. 2,000	Lørenskog	Lørenskog IF	3. divisjon
50		Kristiansand Stadion	2,000	Kristiansand	Donn	4. divisjon
51		Føyka Stadion	c. 2,000	Asker	Asker Fotball	3. divisjon
52		Ullernbanen	c. 2,000	Oslo	Ullern	3. divisjon
53		Kongsberg Stadion	c. 2,000	Kongsberg	Kongsberg IF	4. divisjon
54		Lambertseter Stadion	c. 2,000	Oslo	Manglerud Star	4. divisjon
55		Sofiemyr Stadion	c. 2,000	Kolbotn	Kolbotn	Toppserien
56		Ålgård Stadion	c. 2,000	Ålgård	Ålgård FK	4. divisjon
57		Idrettsparken	1,924	Egersund	Egersunds IK	1. divisjon
58		Storstadion	1,900	Sandefjord	Sandefjord BK	4. divisjon
59		Tromsdalen Stadion	1,900	Tromsø	Tromsdalen	2. divisjon
60		Nammo Stadion	1,800	Raufoss	Raufoss Fotball	1. divisjon
61		Strømmen Stadion	1,723	Strømmen	Strømmen IF	1. divisjon
62		Myhrer Stadion	c. 1,500	Eidsvoll	Eidsvold Turn	2. divisjon
63		Ski Stadion	1,500	Ski	Follo	2. divisjon
64		Stampesletta	1,500	Lillehammer	Lillehammer FK	4. divisjon
65		Nybergsund Stadion	1,500	Nybergsund	Nybergsund-Trysil	4. divisjon
66		Stord Stadion	1,500	Leirvik	Stord IL	3. divisjon
67		Seiersten Stadion	c. 1,500	Drøbak	Drøbak/Frogn	4. divisjon
68		Molde Idrettspark	1450	Molde	None	
69		Gjøvik Stadion	1426	Gjøvik	FK Gjøvik-Lyn	2. divisjon
70		Grefsen Stadion	1,420	Oslo	Kjelsås	2. divisjon
71		Elverum Stadion	1,400	Elverum	Elverum Fotball	3. divisjon
72		Idrettsparken	1,250	Mandal	Mandalskameratene	3. divisjon
73		Ågotnes Stadion	c. 1,200	Ågotnes		
74		Åsebøen Stadion	1,062	Kopervik	Kopervik Idrettslag	4. divisjon
75		Klepp Stadion	c. 1,000	Kleppe	Klepp IL	2. divisjon
76		Randaberg Stadion	1,000	Randaberg	Randaberg IL	4. divisjon
77		Finnmarkshallen	1,000	Alta	Alta IF	2. divisjon
78		Stemmemyren	1,000	Bergen	Sandviken	3. divisjon
79		Jevnaker Stadion	c. 1,000	Jevnaker	Jevnaker	4. divisjon
80		Pors Stadion	c. 1,000	Porsgrunn	Pors	3. divisjon

A selection of former Norwegian football stadiums, which have been demolished or fundamentally redesigned, or that are not in use for football as of 2013:

- Krohnsminde (stands demolished)
- Kråmyra Stadion (demolished)
- Old Fredrikstad Stadion (demolished)
- Stavanger Stadion (not in use)
- Telenor Arena (redesigned, not in use)
- Voldsløkka Stadion (not in use)
- Fana Stadion (not in use)

== See also ==
- List of Eliteserien venues
- List of stadiums in the Nordic countries by capacity
- List of European stadiums by capacity
- List of association football stadiums by capacity
- List of association football stadiums by country
- List of sports venues by capacity
- List of stadiums by capacity
- Lists of stadiums
