= Telenor Cinclus =

Telenor Cinclus AS
- Company type: Joint venture
- Industry: Telecommunications
- Founded: 2004
- Headquarters: Fornebu, Norway
- Key people: Morten Tengs (CEO)
- Products: Automatic meter reading
- Operating income: −300 million kr (2007)
- Number of employees: 100 (2000)
- Parent: Telenor; Skagerak Energi
- Website: www.telenorcinclus.com

Telenor Cinclus is a Norwegian supplier of automatic meter reading. Products are marketed as Cinclus Technology. The company is owned by Telenor (66%) and Skagerak Energi (34%), the latter being a subsidiary of Statkraft. Telenor Cinclus is based at Fornebu outside Oslo, Norway. Additional offices are located in Lillehammer, Stockholm, Sweden and Vaasa, Finland.

In 2006, Telenor Cinclus signed an agreement with the energy companies E.ON and Fortum in Sweden to install 800,000 readers. The investment cost 1.1 billion kr, but Telenor failed to correctly estimate the cost of installing the readers in each home. In 2007, the company lost NOK 300 million.
