= Aker Stadion =

Football stadium in Moide, Norway

Aker stadion
- Røkkeløkka
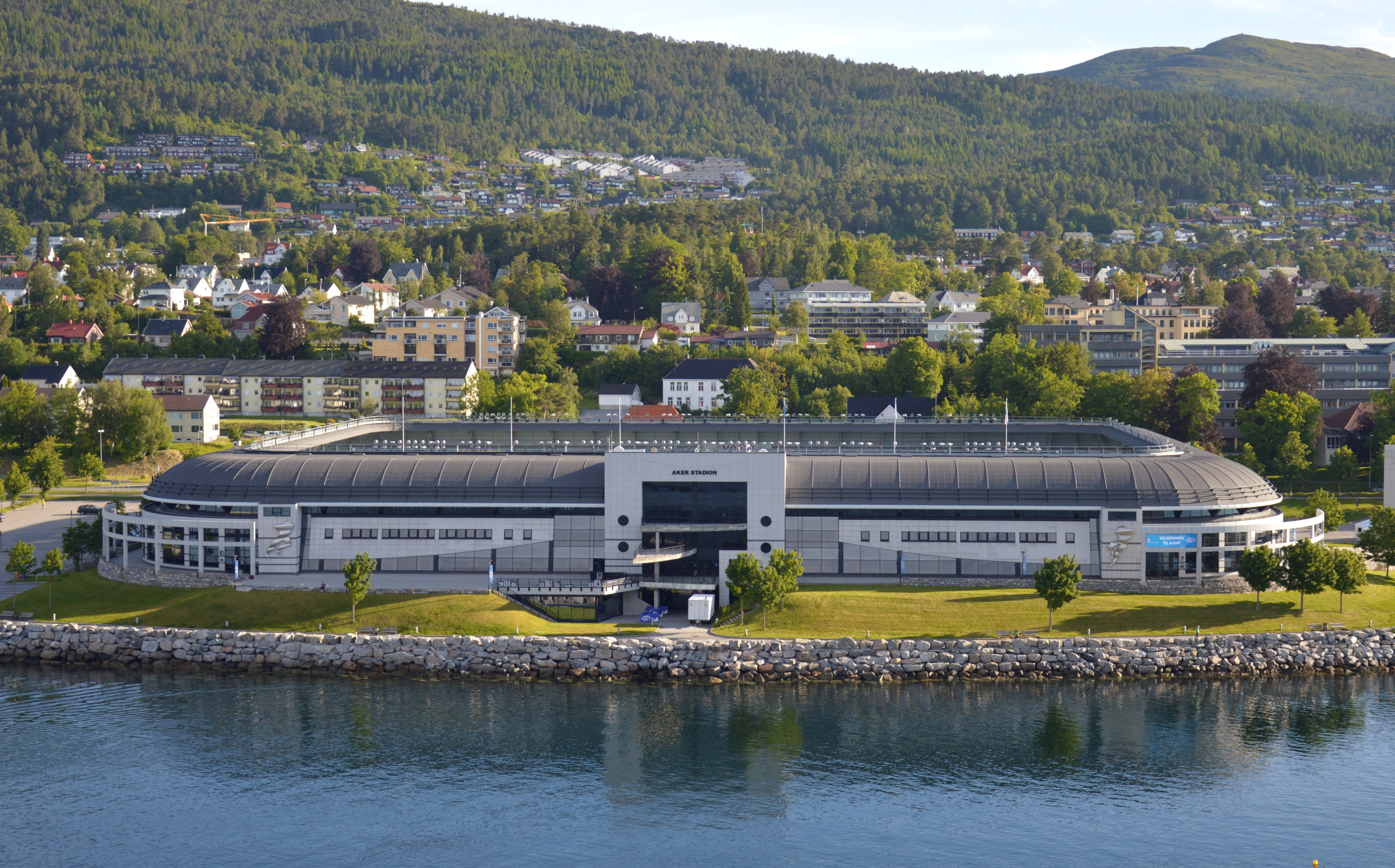
- Interactive map of Aker stadion
- Former names: Molde Stadion
- Location: Reknes, Molde, Norway
- Coordinates: 62°44′0″N 7°8′52″E
- Owner: Molde
- Operator: Molde
- Capacity: 11,249
- Surface: GreenFields BV Artificial turf
- Record attendance: 13,308
- Field size: 105 × 68 m

Construction
- Groundbreaking: March 1997
- Opened: 18 April 1998
- Cost: NOK 212 million
- Architect: Kjell Kosberg

Tenant
- Molde (1998–present)

The Aker Stadion (known as Molde Stadion for UEFA competitions and prior to sponsorship) is an all-seater football stadium located at Reknes in Molde, Norway, and is the home of Eliteserien club Molde. The stadium has a current capacity of 11,249 spectators.

The building was designed by architect Kjell Kosberg. It cost 212 million kr, most of which was paid for by club owner Kjell Inge Røkke—after whom the ground has been nicknamed "Røkkeløkka". The main construction work took place in 1997, and the stadium was inaugurated on 18 April 1998 in a league game against Lillestrøm, replacing Molde idrettspark as Molde's home ground. The stadium was nominated for the FIABCI Prix D' Excellence and awarded the City Prize in 1999. The record attendance of 13,308 was set in a league match against Rosenborg in 1998. The same year, the arena hosted its first international match, where Norway beat Saudi Arabia 6–0. The following year, when Molde reached the UEFA Champions League, the stadium was converted to an all-seater, reducing its capacity. Since May 2006, the stadium name has been sponsored by Røkke's company Aker. The grass pitch was replaced with artificial turf in 2014.

== History ==
Since 1955, Molde had been playing their home games at Molde Idrettspark (at the time called Molde Stadion), a municipally owned multi-use venue. A new stadium was proposed to be located at the waterfront at Reknes. There were many local protests, including complaints about the size of the structure. Construction of the land fillings and preparation of the construction site started in March 1997, before final approval had been granted by the municipality.

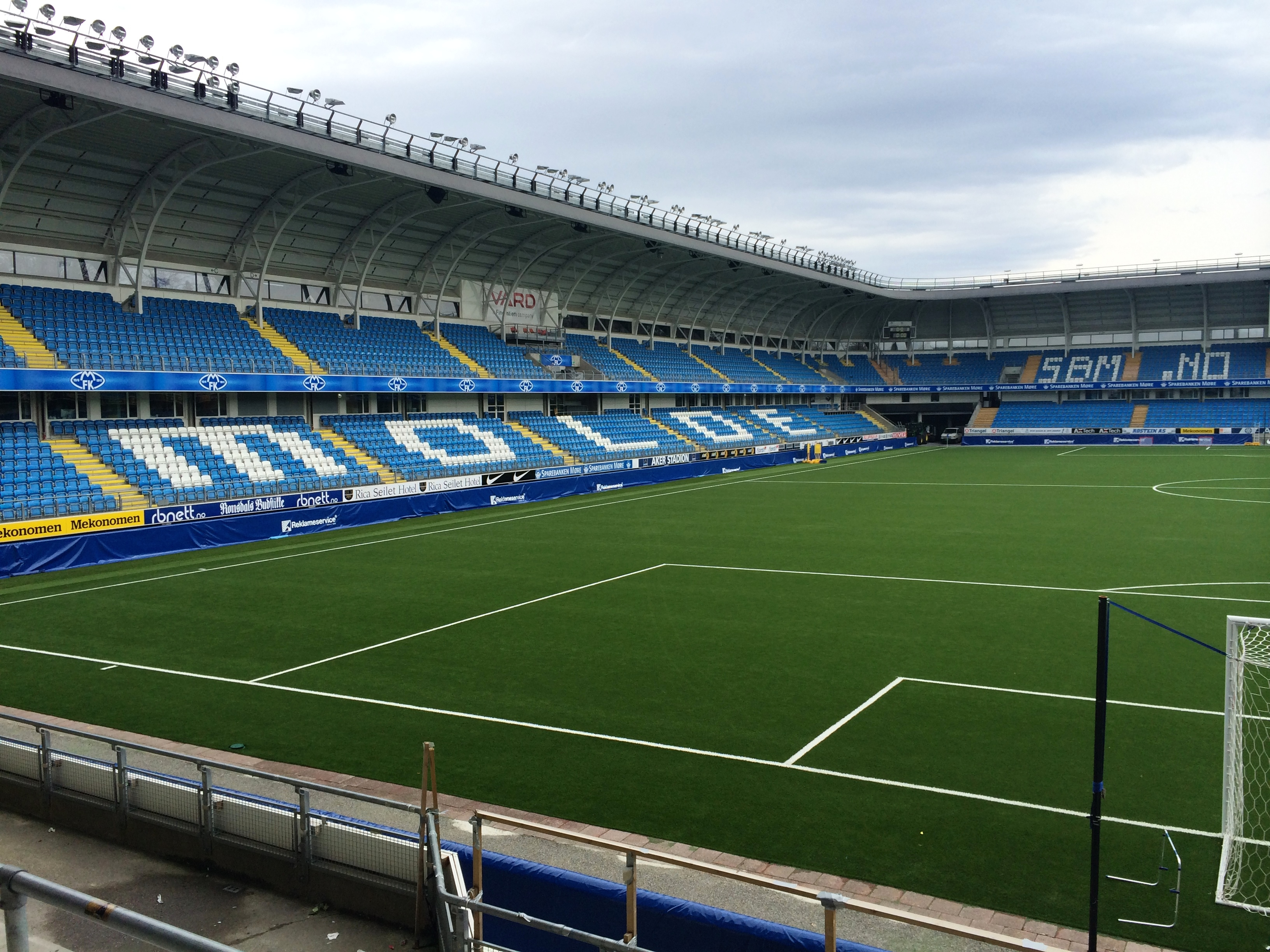
The stadium in 2014

The stadium was inaugurated on 18 April 1998, when the stadium was officially opened by Prime Minister and Molde fan Kjell Magne Bondevik. In the opening match, Molde beat Lillestrøm 4–0 in their first home game of the season, attracting 13,010 spectators. During the season, this was the match in the country with the most spectators not hosted at Rosenborg's home ground, Lerkendal. On 27 May, the arena hosted its first international match, with Norway beating Saudi Arabia 6–0 in a 1998 World Cup friendly. On 11 August, CSKA Sofia visited Molde for the second qualifying round of the UEFA Cup, for which Molde failed to qualify. The all-time spectator record was set on 26 September, when Molde hosted Rosenborg in front of 13,308 people.

During the fall of 1999, Molde played two qualification games for the UEFA Champions League at the stadium. Following the aggregated victories over CSKA Moscow and Mallorca, Molde qualified for the group stage, where they played Real Madrid, Porto and Olympiacos. Following entry into the Champions League, the stadium was converted to an all-seater, with seats being installed on the lower sections of the short end stands. They reduced the attendance capacity permanently because the club chose to not remove the seats afterwards.

In 2006, an agreement was made where Røkke's company Aker became the stadium name sponsor, with the stadium being renamed Aker Stadion. The same season, the club was relegated to the First Division, where the team played in 2007. Despite the relegation, average attendance increased, and Molde won the league. Since 2008, the team has again played in the top flight.

Molde later entered the UEFA Cup four times (renamed to Europa League in 2010): in 2000–01, 2003–04, 2006–07, and 2010–11, playing a total of eight home games before they, in 2012, again played qualification for the Champions League and Ventspils and Basel visited the Aker Stadion. Molde was eliminated by Basel but managed to qualify for the Europa League group stage and played against Heerenveen, Stuttgart, Steaua Bucuresti, and Copenhagen at the Aker Stadion. In the 2015–16 season, Ajax, Fenerbahçe, and Celtic visited Molde during the Europa League group stage after they had beaten Standard Liège in the play-off and before Sevilla came to the Aker Stadion in the Round of 32 in February 2016. On 19 November 2013, the Aker Stadion hosted its second international match, a friendly. Norway was defeated 1–0 by Scotland.

The Aker Stadion has been proposed for use during the annual Moldejazz, Norway's largest jazz festival, but this has been rejected several times by the festival management. The issue was intensified in 2004, when a much smaller arena was used for a quickly sold-out Stevie Wonder concert. On 6 October 2007, StatoilHydro arranged a free concert at the stadium with Ane Brun and Röyksopp to celebrate the completion of their near-by processing plant for the gas field. Ormen Lange. In a 2012 survey carried out by the Norwegian Players' Association among away-team captains, the Aker Stadion was found to be the league's fourth-best stadium, with a score of 4.27 on a scale from one to five.

The club decided on 4 October 2013 to lay artificial turf on the field, which it hoped would be in place ahead of the 2014 season. The club was especially concerned with the poor surface during March, April, October, and November. It also cited the possibility of hosting all trainings at the stadium and that the field could be used for 2,000 instead of 130 hours per year. The stadium hosted its second international match on 19 November 2013, when Norway was defeated 0–1 by Scotland in a friendly match watched by 9,750 spectators. It was the first time since 2002 that a home Norway game was not played at the national stadium, the Ullevaal Stadion. In October 2017, the artificial turf was changed to a newer generation.

== Facilities ==
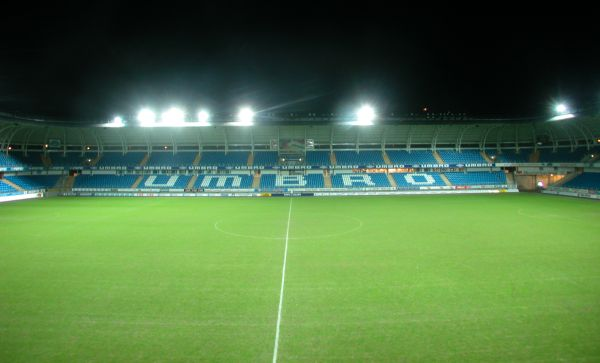
The original grass turf in 2003.

The stadium was designed by Kjell Kosberg of Kosbergs Arkitektkontorer. In addition to featuring the stadium, the complex has 2,800 square metres (30,000 sq ft) of commercial space. The whole structure cost NOK 212 million, of which NOK 160 million was for the stadium itself. The stadium is located at Reknes, just west of the city center, on the shore of the Moldefjord. The exterior of the building is clad with two colors of granite, glass, and aluminum. The building was financed by Kjell Inge Røkke, although NOK 10 million was paid by the municipality and NOK 2.7 million by Norsk Tipping. In 1999, the structure won the City Prize, which is awarded to the Norwegian building project that is both profitable, innovative and increases the value of the surrounding area. The stadium was also nominated to FIABCI's Prix D' Excellence.

There are four stands in two tiers built as a continuous whole with a capacity of 11,167. Prior to 1999, the lower tiers along the short sides had terraces, allowing an initial capacity of 13,308. There are 13 entrances, 52 toilets, and 9 kiosks. The stadium has thirteen executive boxes in the north stand, varying in size between 18 and 33 square metres (190 and 360 sq ft). The arena is 17,250 square metres (185,700 sq ft), measuring 150 by 115 metres (492 by 377 ft). It includes a restaurant and café, in addition to a medical clinic. The pitch is 105 by 68 metres (344 by 223 ft) of natural grass, with 4% artificial turf sown in. Floodlight is provided with 176 lamps, mounted at a low 19.5 metres (64 ft). The speaker system has 32 kW.

The stadium is located within walking distance of the city center. There is no public transport that serves the arena, but all city and regional buses serve the city center's bus terminal, which is within walking distance. On game days, Aukra Auto operates a bus service from Aukrasanden, while Nettbuss operates from Eidsvåg, Kleive, Batnfjordsøra, and Sjøholt. Tide Sjø operates a fast ferry to Helland and Vikebukt. There are a very limited number of parking spaces at the stadium, and these are limited to holders of VIP tickets.

== Attendance ==
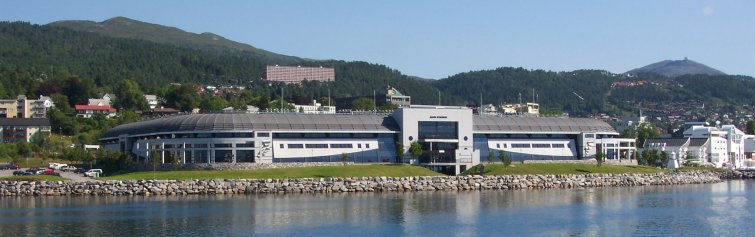
The stadium as seen from the fjord

The stadium has hosted more than 10,000 spectators 39 times, including the international game between Norway and Saudi Arabia, which attracted 13,114 spectators. Molde has attracted such attendance thirty-four times in Eliteserien, of which thirteen have been against Rosenborg and eight in derbies against Aalesunds. In addition, two high-attendance matches have been played in the Champions League and one in the Norwegian Cup. The all-time record dates from the 1998 derby with Rosenborg, which was followed by 13,308 spectators.

The highest average attendance at the Aker Stadion over a league season was 9,817, set in the 2011 season. The lowest average attendance at the Aker Stadon came in the 2004 season, when an average of 5,554 spectators watched each game.

The following list includes the attendance for Molde during the home domestic league matches. It excludes cup and UEFA tournaments. In 2007, the club played in the 1. divisjon. The table includes average, minimum, and maximum attendance, in addition to the attendance rank among the top-league teams.

	Eliteserien
†	1. divisjon

League attendances
Season	Avg	Min	Max	Rank	Ref
1998	8,516	6,036	13,308	3	
1999	7,163	4,500	12,914	3	
2000	6,816	5,382	11,167	4	
2001	6,601	4,883	11,167	5	
2002	6,193	4,303	11,167	6	
2003	5,945	3,822	11,167	7	
2004	5,554	4,187	9,142	9	
2005	6,512	4,525	11,167	9	
2006	6,127	4,351	9,215	8	
2007	6,344	5,226	7,530	1†	
2008	8,203	6,969	11,400	8	
2009	7,965	5,741	11,168	9	
2010	8,413	7,302	11,140	6	
2011	9,817	8,158	11,292	5	
2012	9,338	8,503	11,112	5	
2013	8,828	7,854	11,074	8	
2014	9,243	8,284	11,424	5	
2015	8,952	8,141	11,113	4	
2016	8,392	7,459	11,348	5	
2017	7,785	6,635	10,720	4	
2018	7,111	6,218	9,444	4	
2019	6,956	5,952	9,010	5	

== See also ==
- Molde Idrettspark
- List of Eliteserien venues
- List of football stadiums in Norway
- Lists of stadiums
