= List of stadiums in the Nordic countries by capacity =

This is a list of stadiums in the Nordic countries by capacity. The Nordic countries are Sweden, Norway, Finland, Denmark and Iceland. Stadiums with a capacity of 15,000 or more are included.

== Existing stadiums ==
| # | Stadium | Capacity | City | Country | Image |
|---|---|---|---|---|---|
| 1 | Strawberry Arena | 54,329 | Stockholm | Sweden | |
| 2 | Ullevi | 43,000 | Gothenburg | Sweden | |
| 3 | Parken Stadium | 38,065 | Copenhagen | Denmark | |
| 4 | Helsinki Olympic Stadium | 36,200 | Helsinki | Finland | |
| 5 | 3Arena | 30,000 | Stockholm | Sweden | |
| 6 | Brøndby Stadium | 29,000 | Brøndby | Denmark | |
| 7 | Ullevaal Stadion | 28,000 | Oslo | Norway | |
| 8 | Stadion | 24,000 | Malmö | Sweden | |
| 9 | Lerkendal Stadion | 21,166 | Trondheim | Norway | |
| 10 | Ceres Park | 19,433 | Aarhus | Denmark | |
| 11 | Gamla Ullevi | 18,416 | Gothenburg | Sweden | |
| 12 | Esbjerg Stadium | 17,442 | Esbjerg | Denmark | |
| 13 | Nya Parken | 17,234 | Norrköping | Sweden | |
| 14 | Tampere Stadium | 17,000 | Tampere | Finland | |
| 15 | Borås Arena | 16,899 | Borås | Sweden | |
| 16 | Brann Stadion | 16,750 | Bergen | Norway | |
| 17 | Intility Arena | 16,550 | Oslo | Norway | |
| 18 | Olympia | 16,500 | Helsingborg | Sweden | |
| 19 | Viking Stadion | 16,300 | Stavanger | Norway | |
| 20 | Odense Stadion | 15,790 | Odense | Denmark | |
| 21 | Bislett Stadium | 15,400 | Oslo | Norway | |

== See also ==
- List of European stadiums by capacity
- List of association football stadiums by capacity
- Lists of stadiums
- List of football stadiums in Denmark
- List of football stadiums in Finland
- List of football stadiums in Iceland
- List of football stadiums in Norway
- List of football stadiums in Sweden
