= Lambertseter IF =

Norwegian football club

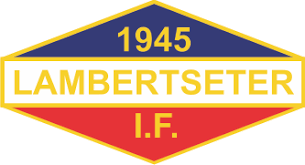
- Full name: Lambertseter Idrettsforening
- Founded: 19 October 1970
- Ground: Lambertseter stadion, Oslo
- League: Fourth Division
- 2024: 10th

Lambertseter Idrettsforening is a Norwegian multi-sports club from Lambertseter, Oslo. The club has sections for association football, team handball, floorball, badminton, discgolf and athletics.

The club was founded in 1945 as Høgda IF, named after Nordstrandshøgda and Bekkelagshøgda. The name Lambertseter IF was taken in 1952. The club colours are blue with white and red stripes.

The club is mainly known for its athletics section. The brothers Espen, Marius and Vegard Rooth were sprinters on a national level, winning several national titles. Vegard's daughter Andrea Rooth, also representing Lambertseter IF, became an international competitor. Lambertseter IF has also arranged the athletics meet Clean Air Games.

The men's football team plays in the Fourth Division, the fifth tier of football in Norway.
