= Spiris Arena =

Football stadium in Växjö, Sweden

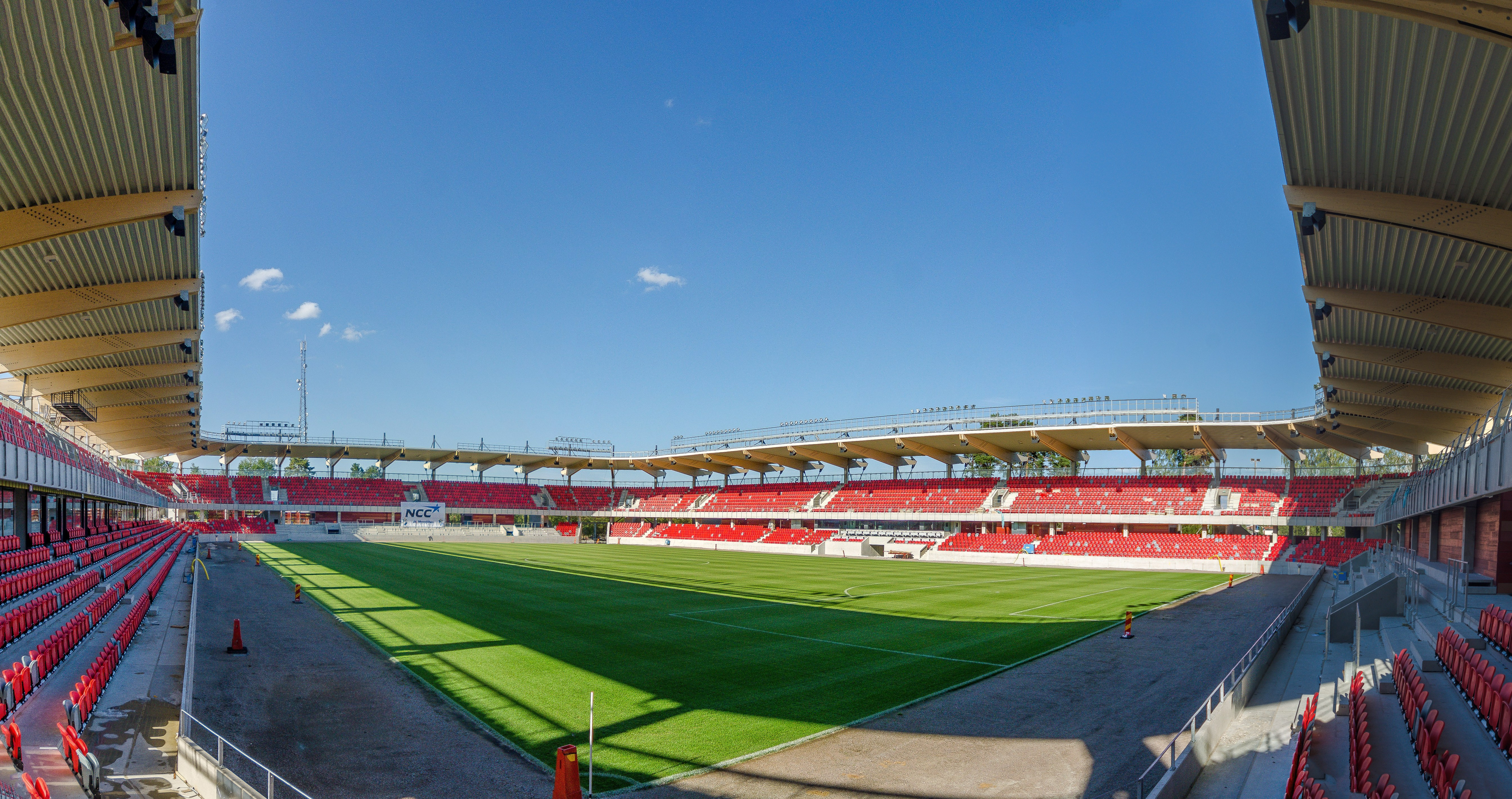
- The interior of the Visma Arena.
- Interactive map of Spiris Arena
- Location: Bollgatan 9, 352 46 Växjö
- Coordinates: 56°52′47″N 14°46′35″E
- Owner: Östers IF
- Operator: Växjö Fotbollsfastigheter AB
- Capacity: 12,000, of which 10,000 are seated
- Surface: Grass
- Field size: 105 × 68 m

Construction
- Groundbreaking: 2011
- Opened: 1 September 2012
- Cost: 204 million SEK
- Architect: Arkitektbyrån AB

Tenants
- Östers IF (2012–present); Växjö DFF

The Spiris Arena or Växjö Arena is a football stadium in Växjö, Sweden and the home of Superettan club Östers IF. The stadium is a part of a large redevelopment of the area formerly known as Värendsvallen into Arenastaden, which also includes a new ice hockey arena, floorball arena and a dedicated indoor athletics arena. Between 2012 and 2020, it was known as Myresjöhus Arena.

== History ==
On 29 March 2011 it was announced that the house builder Myresjöhus had purchased the naming rights to the stadium for an undisclosed amount. Myresjöhus Arena is a dedicated football stadium with a capacity of 12,000 (10,000 seated), with the entire audience under roof. The stadium conforms to UEFA category 3 for international games as well as Svenska Fotbollförbundets upcoming demands for stadiums in Allsvenskan. The official groundbreaking took place on 31 March 2011 and was led by Lars-Åke Lagrell, chairman of Svenska Fotbollförbundet. The first competitive football match at the stadium was played on 3 September 2012 between Småland rivals Östers IF and IFK Värnamo in Superettan, ending in a 1–1 draw.

== Structure and facilities ==
Facts and figures in short:

- Seated audience: 10 000
- Standing audience: 2 000
- Gates: 4
- Boxes: 16
- Restaurants: 2
- Pubs: 2
- Toilets: 144
- 20 places for wheelchairs with adjacent seating for personal assistants
- Playing area 105x68, field area 120x80

== UEFA Women's Euro 2013 ==
The stadium hosted three first-round games and one quarter-final at UEFA Women's Euro 2013. During the finals it was known as the "Växjö Arena" for sponsorship reasons.

The following matches were played at the stadium during the UEFA Women's Euro 2013:

Date	Time (CEST)	Team #1	Result	Team #2	Round	Spectators
11 July 2013	20.30	Germany	0 – 0	Netherlands	Group B	8,861
14 July 2013	20.30	Iceland	0 – 3	Germany	Group B	4,620
17 July 2013	18.00	Netherlands	0 – 1	Iceland	Group B	3,406
21 July 2013	18.00	Italy	0 – 1	Germany	Quarter-finals	9,265

== Other uses ==
=== International football matches ===
Date	Team #1	Result	Team #2	Competition
23 October 2012	Sweden	3 – 0	Switzerland	Women's friendly
6 April 2013	Sweden	2 – 0	Iceland	Women's friendly
6 June 2013	Sweden	3 – 2	Switzerland	Under-21 friendly
8 May 2014	Sweden	3 – 0	Northern Ireland	Women's world cup qualification

== Records ==
- Record attendance: 12,173, Östers IF against IFK Värnamo, 3 September 2012.

== Panorama image ==
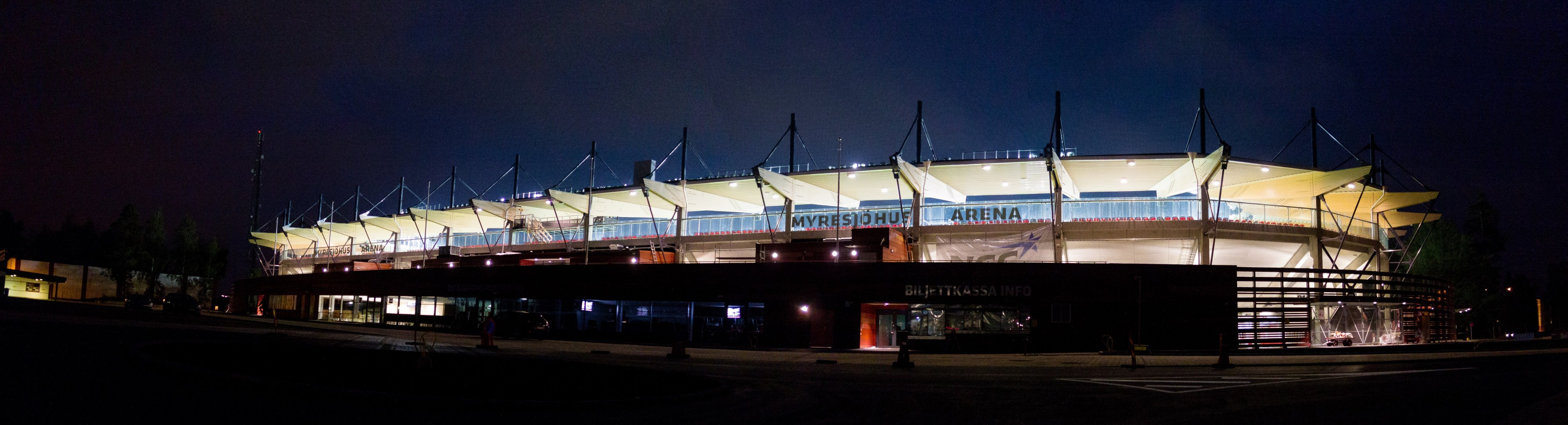
View of the western side at night, 30 August 2012

== Awards ==
- Winner of Växjö Municipality building prize 2013.
- Stadium of the year (2012) nominee at StadiumDB.com.

== See also ==
- List of football stadiums in Sweden
- Lists of stadiums
