= Laugardalsvöllur =

Stadium in Reykjavík, Iceland

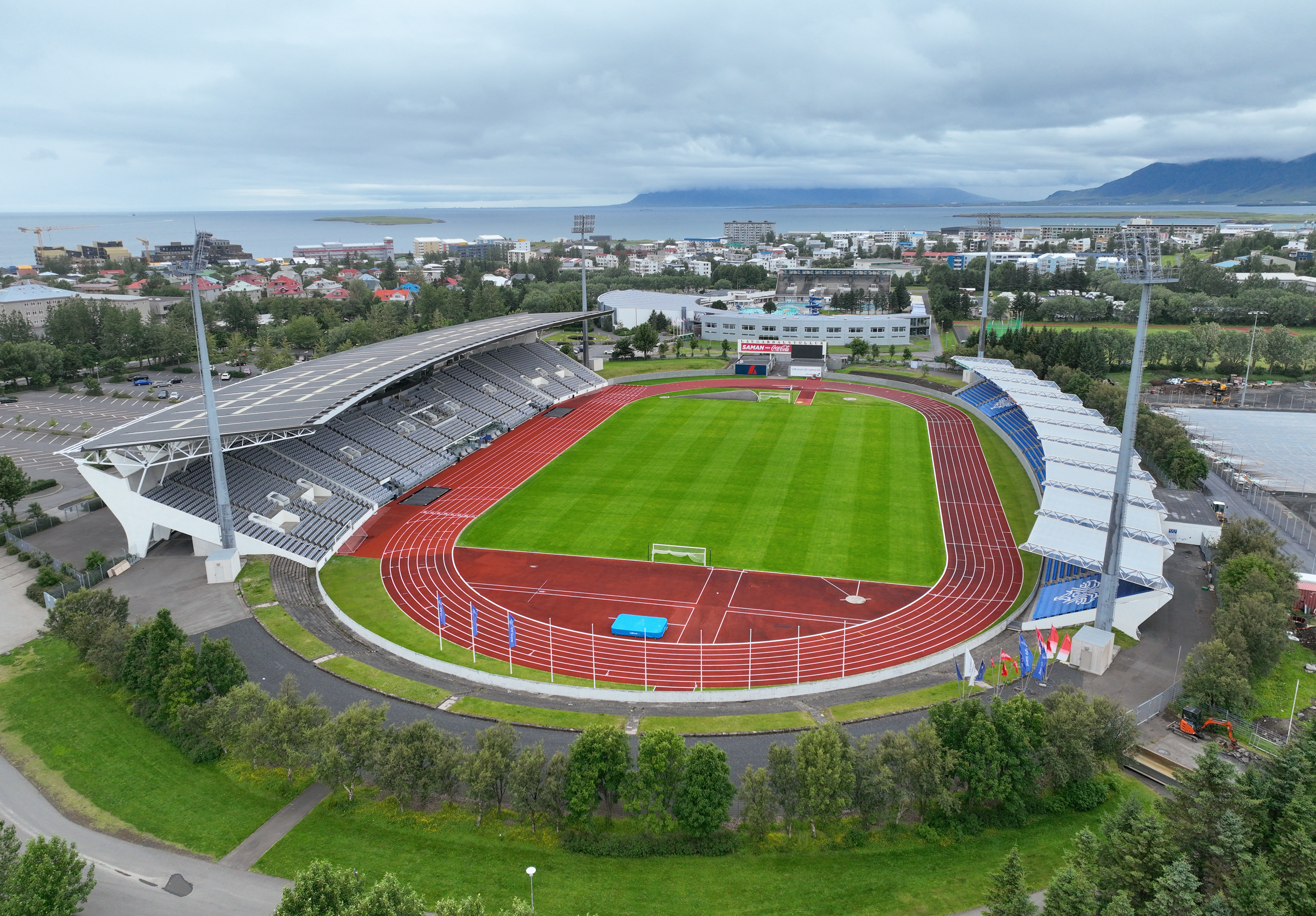
- UEFA
- Interactive map of Laugardalsvöllur
- Location: Laugardalur IS-104; Reykjavík, Iceland
- Coordinates: 64°08′37″N 21°52′44″W
- Capacity: 9,522 (Football); 28,321 (Concerts)
- Surface: GrassMaster

Construction
- Groundbreaking: 1949
- Opened: 17 June 1959; 67 years ago
- Renovated: 1970, 1997, 2007, 2024–

Tenants
- Iceland national football team (1957–present); Knattspyrnufélagið Fram (2022)

Laugardalsvöllur (Icelandic pronunciation: [ˈlœyːɣarˌtalsˌvœtlʏr̥], lit. 'Laugardalur Field' or more precisely 'Laugardalur Stadium') is Iceland's national football stadium and the home venue for the Iceland national football team located in Reykjavík. It has a seating capacity of 9,500 and about 28,321 for concerts.

== History ==
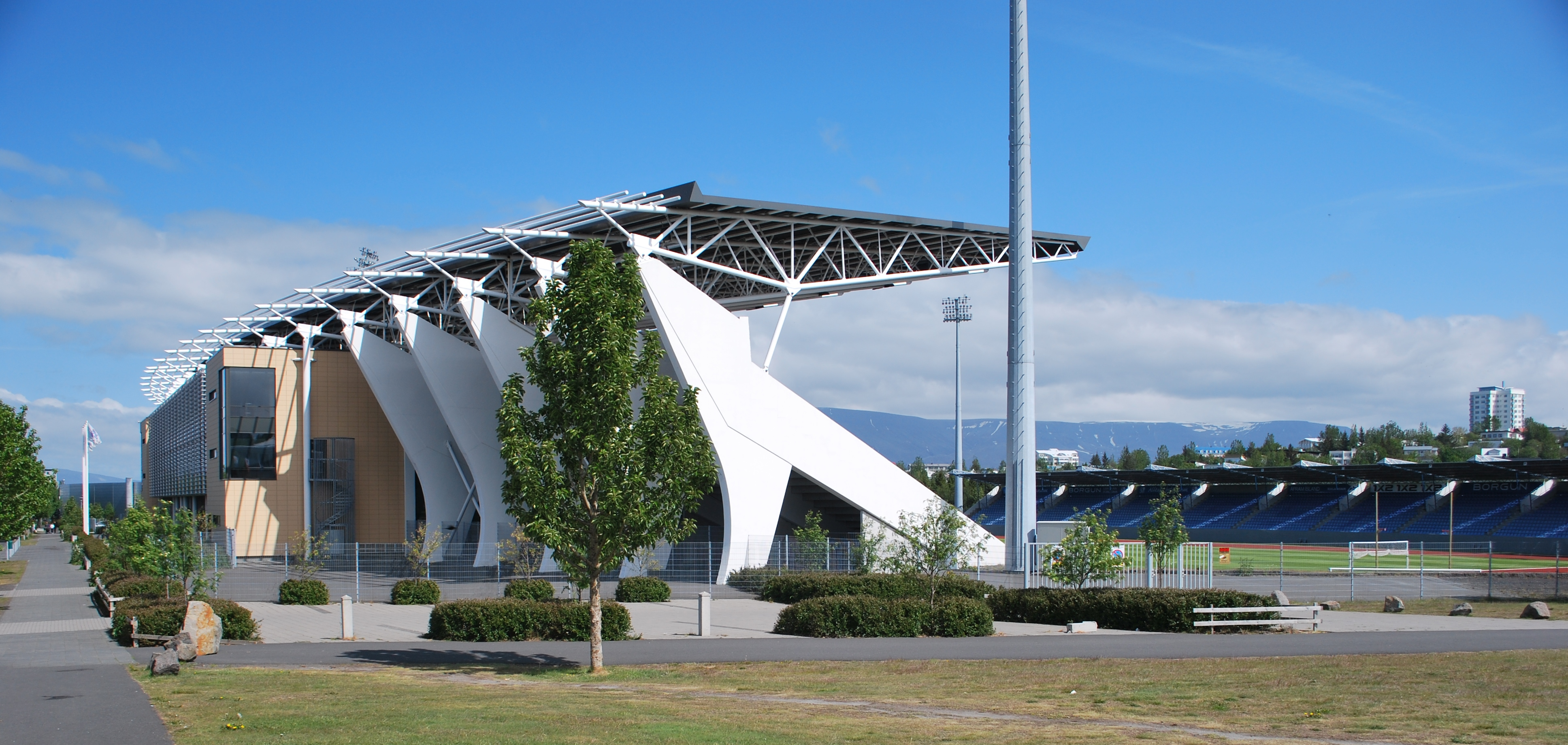
The stadium seen from the footpath along Reykjavegur

The idea of building a sporting venue in Laugardalur, along with some other entertainment and recreational facilities, dates back to 1871. At that time, the population of Reykjavík, the capital of Iceland, was only about 2,000. Laugardalur was also nearly 3 km (1.9 mi) away from residential areas. Little came out of this proposal for the next 60 years or so.

In 1943, the town council set up the Laugardalsnefnd committee. Its task was to make proposals and ideas for the area. The committee then delivered the result later, which included building a new football stadium and a new swimming pool.

Construction of the field started in 1949 and lasted until 1952. A year later in 1953, construction of a new stand started. The stand had a capacity of 4,000 when completed.

The first match was played on Laugardalsvöllur in 1957 when the Iceland men's national football team played against Norway, two years before the official opening on 17 June 1959. A few years later, the stand was renovated and expanded, starting from 1965 to 1970.

Under the new stand there was opened a track-and-field facility, which operated until 2007, although there has always been all-weather running track around the pitch (upgraded in 1992). Later the year 1992, floodlights were inaugurated for the match against Greece.

In 1997, another new stand was built against the old stand, across the pitch. Constructions started a year earlier. It has a capacity of 3,500. At the same time, the old stand was relieved by matching it with the new stand by seating capacity.

Big renovation and expansion of the old stand started in 2005. After the completion in 2007, the stadium has a capacity of 9,800. Additional capacity can be added by bringing in two temporary stands seating 1,500 each, giving the stadium a maximum capacity of 12,800 but after the new requirements of FIFA for national football stadiums, this addition method has been forbidden. No major renovations or expansions have occurred since 2007.

The largest attendance for a football match ever seen at Laugardalsvöllur was 20,204 in 2004 in a friendly match between Iceland and Italy. The largest attendance for the venue about 25,000 during a concert in 2007. On 24 July 2018, American rock band Guns N' Roses played at the stadium in front of 25,000 people, at that time the largest rock concert ever held in Iceland.

In 2024, renovations began in order to install hybrid grass and a heating system underneath the field.

== Facilities ==
The stadium comprises two big stands facing each other. West Stand is the main stand and the larger one. It is the only stand to hold all the facilities needed for the stadium, excluding stadium seating. For the purpose of football matches and other competitions, the stand has 4 changing rooms for players (mainly) and 2 others for referees, which also have the capability of accommodating facility for a doctor or drug test. There are two other rooms for football matches and athletics tournaments administration.

== Future ==
There have been plans by KSÍ (the Football Association of Iceland) to renovate and expand Laugardalsvöllur since 2014, one year after the Iceland men's national football team reached the play-offs for the 2014 FIFA World Cup in 2013. The team's success kept going until they went to UEFA Euro 2016 and reached the quarter-finals. Both Icelandic football fans and KSÍ have been asking Reykjavík city, the current owner of the stadium, for a new stadium because seats have sold out for 7 out of 10 national football team matches in 2013–2015. Despite the attendance, Laugardalsvöllur had a deficit of 3.9 million ISK in 2015, but Reykjavík city then added its contribution of 11 million ISK, leaving a 7 million ISK profit.

Two options are being considered and both include removing the running track and placing stands in its place in addition to moving the pitch closer to the west stand and keeping the west stand in place. One option is a 17,500 capacity stadium with an open roof and heated pitch, costing 7-11 billion ISK. The second option is a 20,000 capacity stadium with a retractable roof over the stadium for the possibility of multi-purpose stadium, that would increase the utilization of seating capacity in the long term. The second option would cost 11-18 billion ISK.

Having a heated pitch is necessary, due to cold and snowy winters in Iceland and also because of the new requirements of UEFA, which indicates that matches for some teams in the qualification competition, for the UEFA European Championship, shall also be played in the winter. The grass would then be maintained itself with an automatic irrigation sprinkler system.

In 2024, a memorandum of understanding was signed to only develop the venue as a soccer-specific stadium in the future. With the removal of the running track and other athletics equipment, athletics would move to a dedicated area.

== Gallery ==
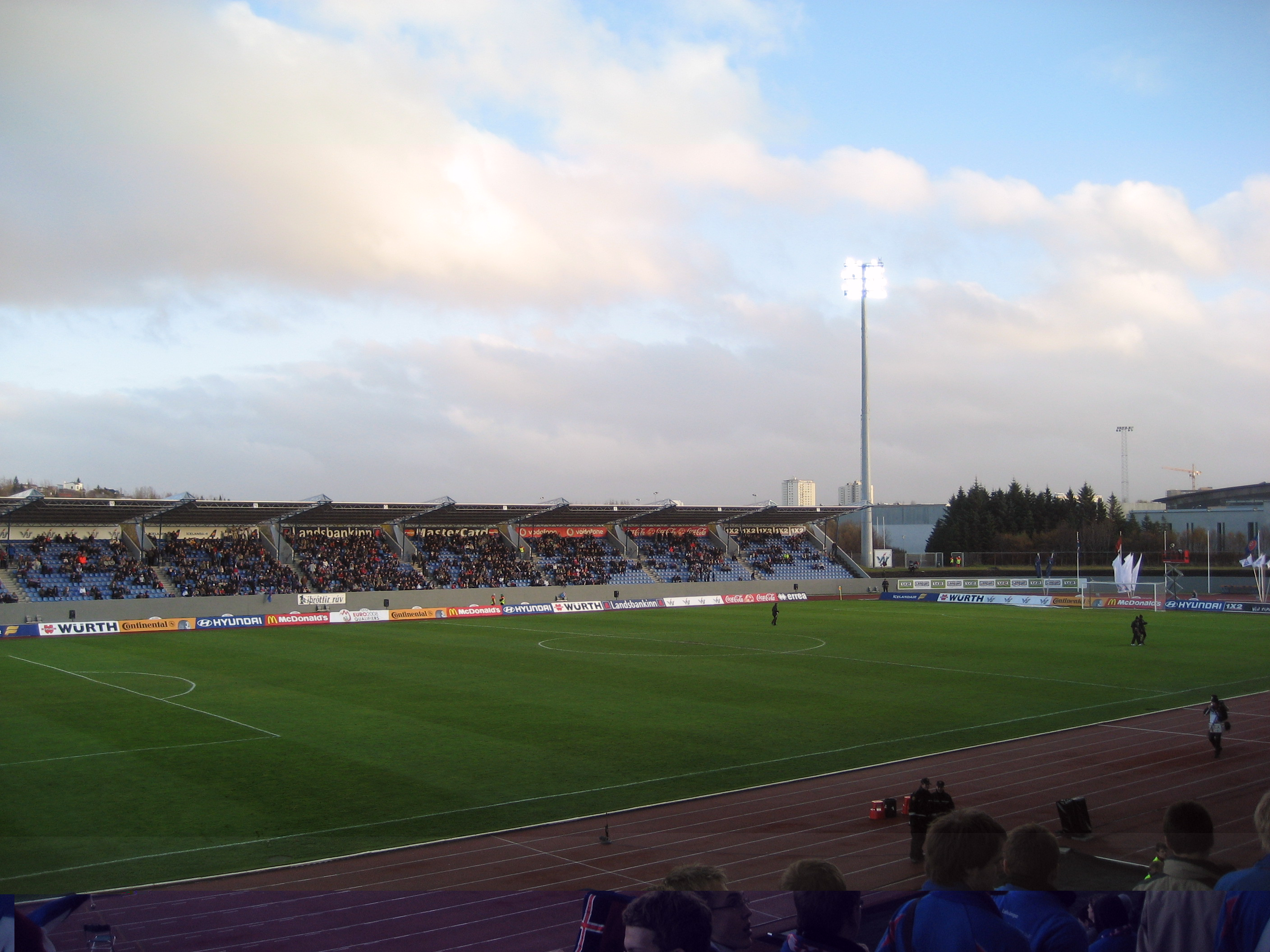
Laugardalsvöllur during a Euro 2008 qualifying game

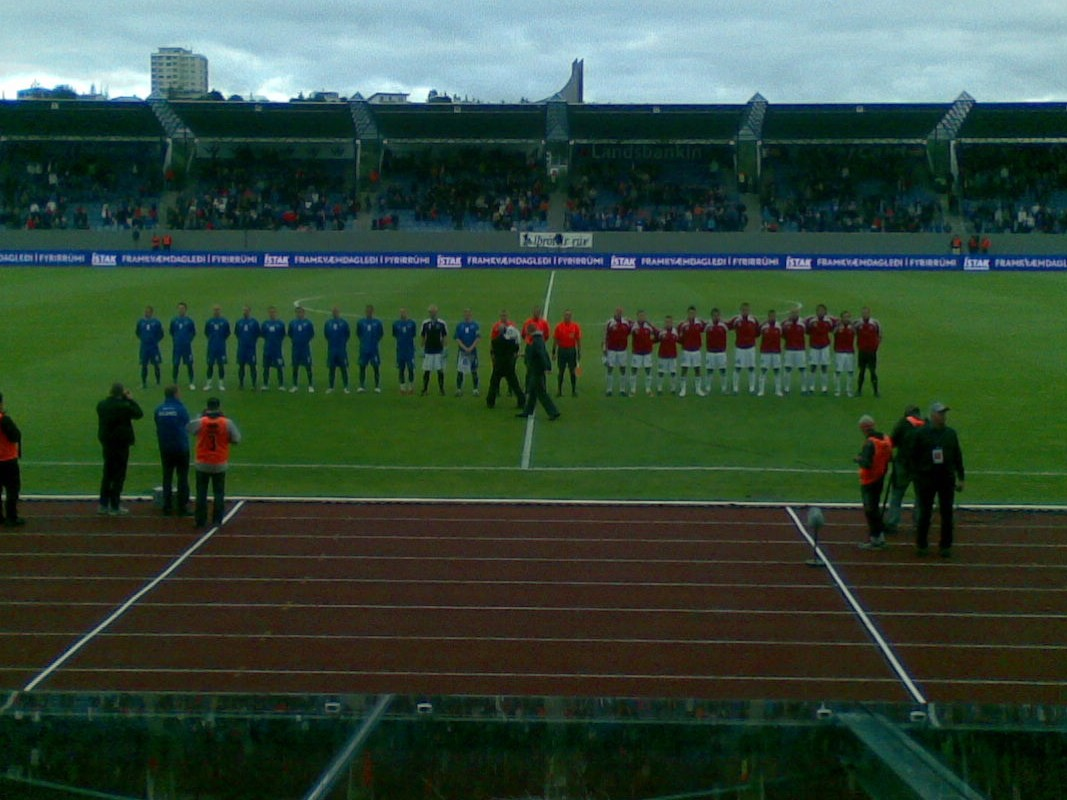
Laugardalsvöllur during the friendly match Iceland-Slovakia, in 2009

== See also ==
- List of football stadiums in Iceland
