= Morgan Andersen =

Norwegian ice hockey player

Morgan Andersen (born 7 April 1966) is a retired Norwegian ice hockey player.

He hails from Yven in Tune. During his active ice hockey career he played for Stjernen, Mora IK and Lillehammer IK. He last played for Stjernen in 1998. He played for the Norwegian national ice hockey team at the 1988, 1992 and 1994 Winter Olympics.

After retiring he has worked as a sports official and coach. He is a former sports director for the football club FK Lyn, and was involved in the transfer controversies around player Mikel John Obi. He has also led the trade union for Norwegian sportspeople, the Norwegian Players' Association, and after his period in Lyn he became sports manager and assistant coach for Stjernen Hockey. In 2009, he was promoted to head coach.

He was arrested by police in December 2011, suspected of participating in tax fraud during payments of football player Raio Piiroja.
