= Brann Stadion =

Football stadium in Bergen, Norway

- Stadion, stadda or staddaen
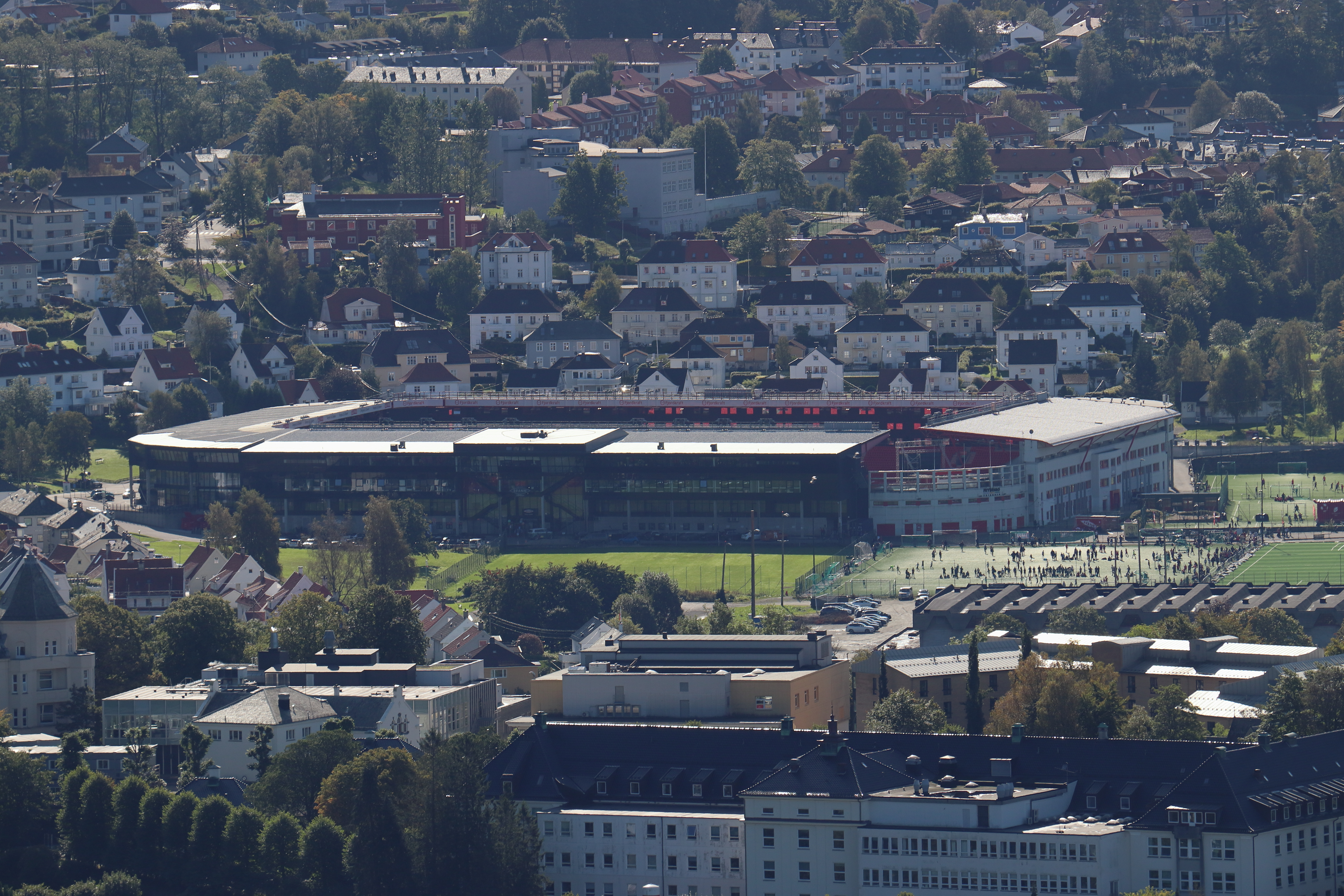
- Brann Stadion in September 2023
- Interactive map of Brann Stadion
- Full name: Brann Stadion
- Location: Bergen, Norway
- Coordinates: 60°22′1″N 5°21′27″E
- Owner: Brann Stadion AS
- Operator: Brann Stadion AS
- Capacity: 17,950
- Surface: Hybrid grass
- Record attendance: 24,800 (Cup) vs. Fredrikstad (1961); 23,900 (League) vs. Lillestrøm (1978)
- Field size: 105 x 68 m

Construction
- Groundbreaking: 1917
- Built: 1919
- Opened: 25 May 1919
- Renovated: Fjordkraft Stand: 2019; SPV stand: 2007
- Expanded: Fjordkraft Stand: Before 1948; Frydenbø stand: 1999; BOBstand: 2006; SPV stand: 1980s

Tenants
- SK Brann (1919–present); SK Brann Kvinner (2024–present)

Brann Stadion is a football stadium in Bergen, Norway. It was constructed in 1919, and has been the home of the football club Brann ever since. The stadium lies 3 km (1.9 mi) south of the city centre, at the foot of Mount Ulriken.

The record attendance dates from 1 October 1961, when Brann hosted Fredrikstad in the cup semi-final, in front of 24,800 spectators. Though its league attendance record is 23,900, from 1978, when they hosted Lillestrøm. Brann Stadion has, per. 2026, a capacity of 17,950. A redevelopment project was underway, aimed at increasing the capacity to over 20,000, but it has been put on hold. Brann Stadion has the third largest attendance capacity in Norway.

== History ==
The history of Brann Stadion begins with Christen K. Gran, a member of the sports committee and one of the founders of Brann. It was his idea, in 1917, that Brann build a new stadium to call their own at Fridalen in the borough of Årstad. His proposal was initially met with scepticism, but he was determined to realize this project for the club and set about obtaining the necessary funds. According to tradition, donations ahead of the 1917 Norwegian Cup final between Brann and Sarpsborg secured the last sums of money needed to purchase the land. Construction began the year after and on 25 May 1919, the stadium was inaugurated with a match between Brann and the Norwegian national team.

At first, the stadium had running tracks, and terraces on each side of the pitch, while the west end and the Clock End remained undeveloped. The club house stood at the halfway line on the south side. During the 1930s, the club house was relocated and the current Main Stand built. Originally, it did not run the full length of the pitch. Over the years it has been expanded at both ends, with each expansion being of a different design from the rest. As a result, today's stand has a rather disjointed look about it. The middle part houses an honorary box above the tunnel, called Brannaltanen (The Brann Balcony).

The north side was redeveloped in 1978, adding a roofed tier behind the original terraces. The bottom part of the stand had a capacity of 3,000 standing spectators, nicknamed Store Stå (The Grand Stand). The crowds there, among the most passionate supporters of the club, used to create an excellent atmosphere. The upper tier seated 2,620. Umbro bought the naming rights to the stand in 2002 when they became the club's kit supplier. In November 2006, the northern stand was demolished to give way for a new all-seated stand with heavily improved VIP facilities.

Since the Hillsborough disaster in 1989 and the ensuing Taylor Report, football clubs in Europe have been converting their stadiums to all-seaters, and although Norwegian clubs have not felt the same pressure as, for example, English clubs, they have been hampered by the fact that continental competitions such as the Champions League and UEFA Cup demand that their games be all-seaters. Whenever Brann have entered European competitions, home games have had to be played with a reduced capacity. Eventually, the Football Association of Norway also began to impose restrictions on non-seated attendance in the domestic league.

At the end of the 1990s major plans were drawn up for the modernization of the stadium (plans which ultimately left the club heavily indebted). In 1997, the final expansion of the Main Stand was completed, putting its capacity at 4,339. The Frydenbø Stand seating 3,892 was built at the west end the following year. The Eastern stand formerly known as the Clock End has been redeveloped into an all-seated stand, which has been given the name The BT stand. At present, a new stand at the northern end is being developed.

In a 2012 survey carried out by the Norwegian Players' Association among away-team captains, Brann Stadion was ranked eighth amongst league stadiums, with a score of 3.47 on a scale from one to five.

== Expansion ==
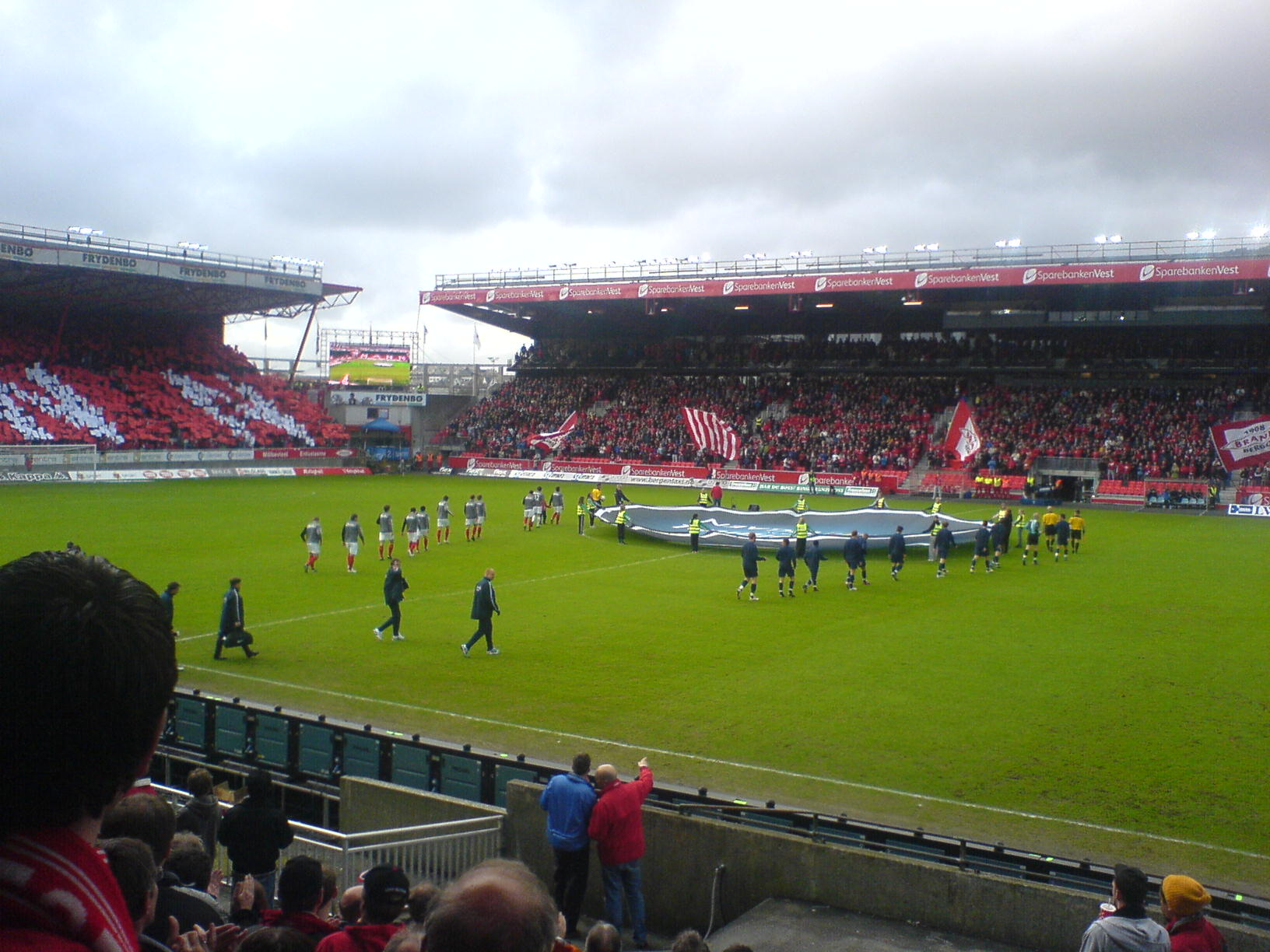
Brann Stadion in April 2007

In 2001, it became clear that Brann would have to improve their stadium, or build a new one. Brann Stadion was still able to hold approximately 20,000 spectators, but increasingly strict rules regarding non-seated attendance meant the terrace capacity was gradually being reduced each year. Apart from the Frydenbø Stand, the stadium was more or less outdated, and many were now advocating the building of a completely new arena, at a different location from the old stadium. With a decision yet to be made, Brann were forced to install temporary bleachers at the Clock End in 2004 to accommodate a higher number of seated spectators. In addition, 160 seats were added to the Frydenbø Stand, increasing the number of seats to 12,211. The total capacity is not limited to 17,950.

Controversy arose when entire rows of seating in the BT Stand collapsed during the game against Tromsø. Each row of seats is fixed to an aluminium rail which in turn is mounted to the concrete floor. Some of the mounts proved too weak to withstand the weight of the crowds, breaking off as people began to take their seats. The 90,000 seats that have been installed in the new Wembley Stadium are of the same design.

The Umbro Stand was torn down at the end of the 2006-season, and has been replaced by a new main stand seating 4,136. This stand features improved VIP facilities, including 35 executive boxes (eight in the corner between the main stand and the Clock End).

== International matches ==
Brann Stadion has hosted 17 international games since 1933. The very first match ended in a 1–2 defeat at the hands of Wales, but since then Norway have not lost any subsequent game in Bergen (P17 W12 D4 L1). The stadium was the venue for three Norwegian Cup finals, in 1922, 1930 and 1947, as well as the national athletics championships in 1920.

== Gallery ==
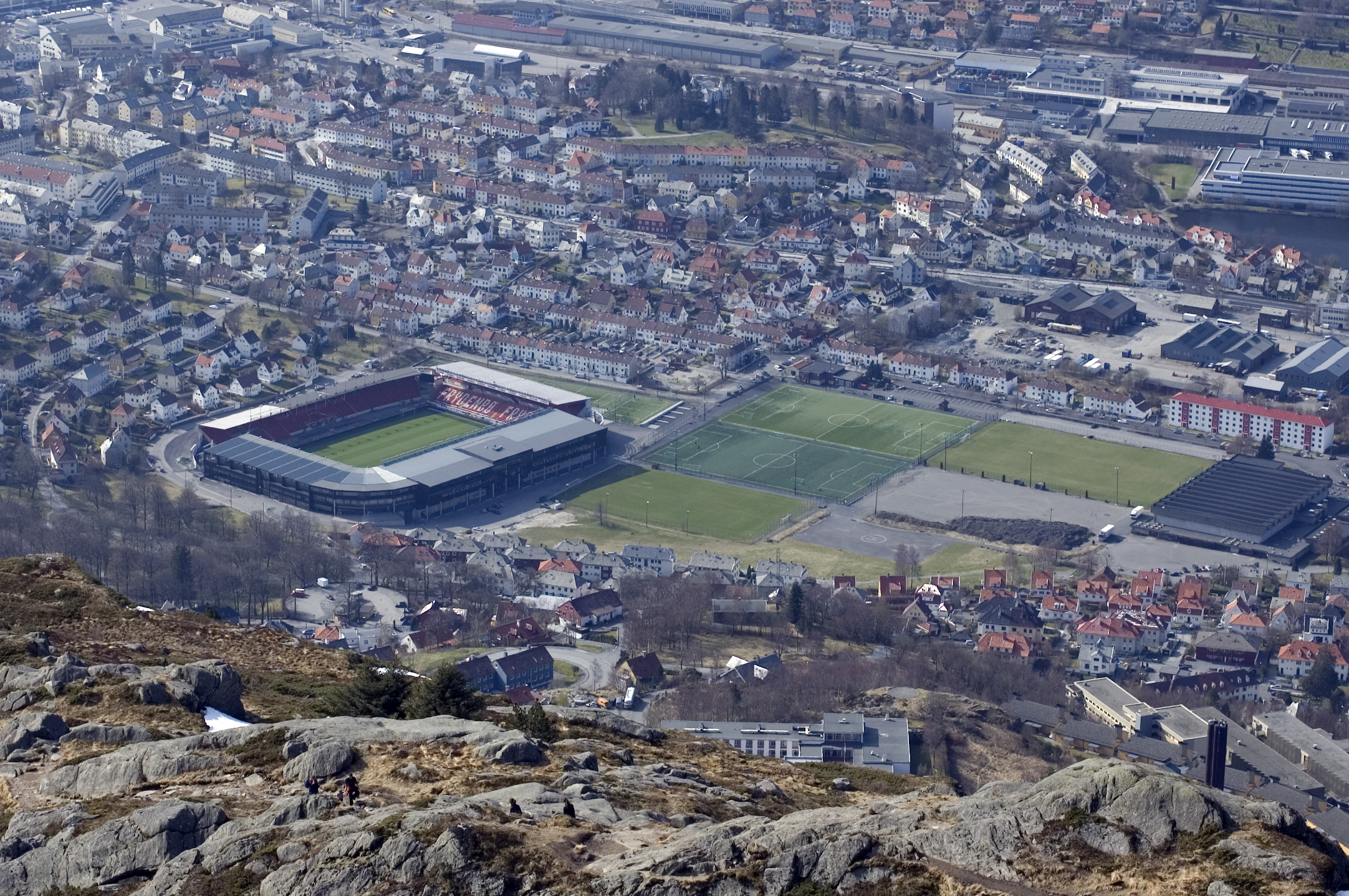
View from Ulriken in 2009

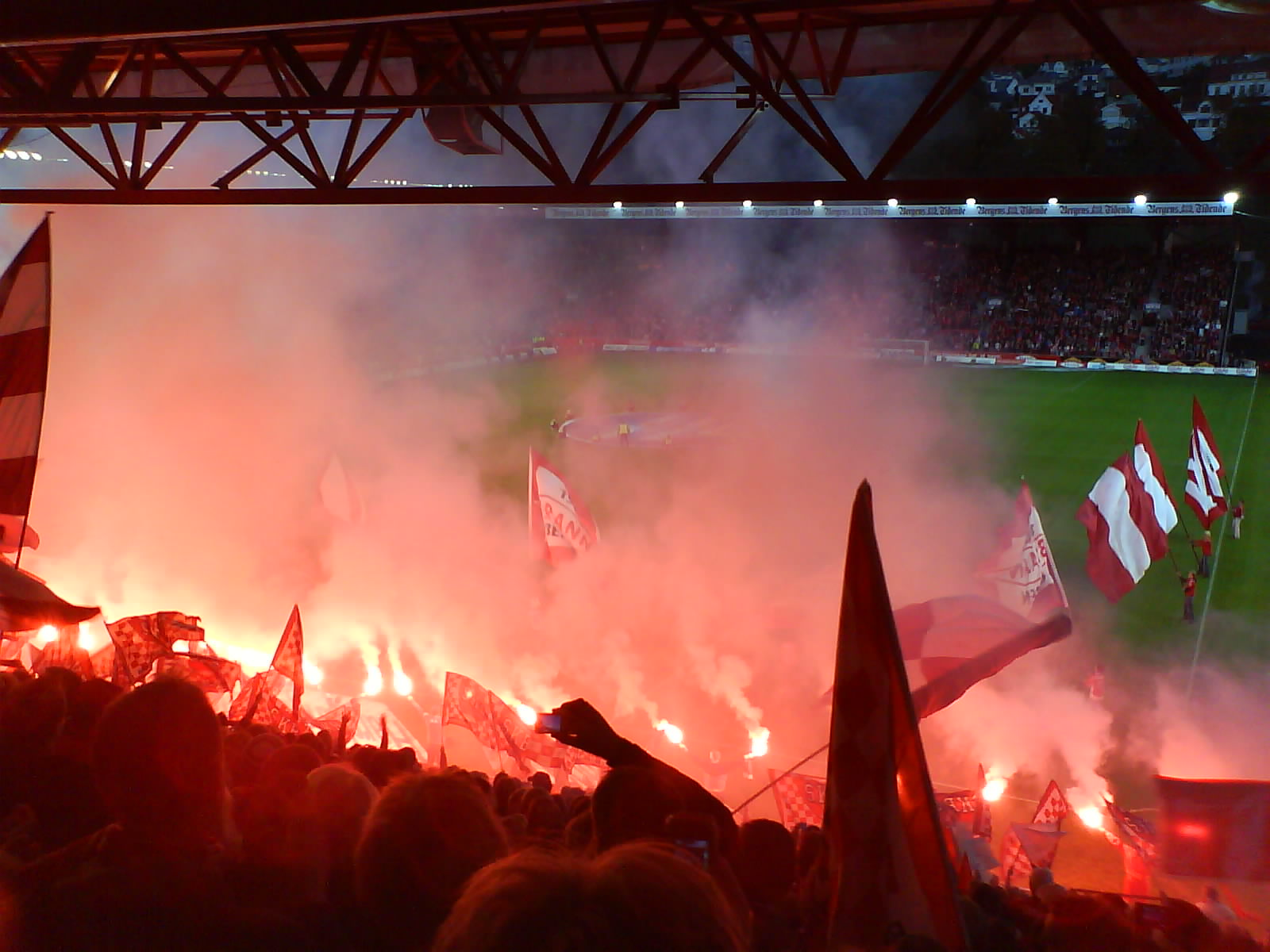
Brann vs Lyn in 2007

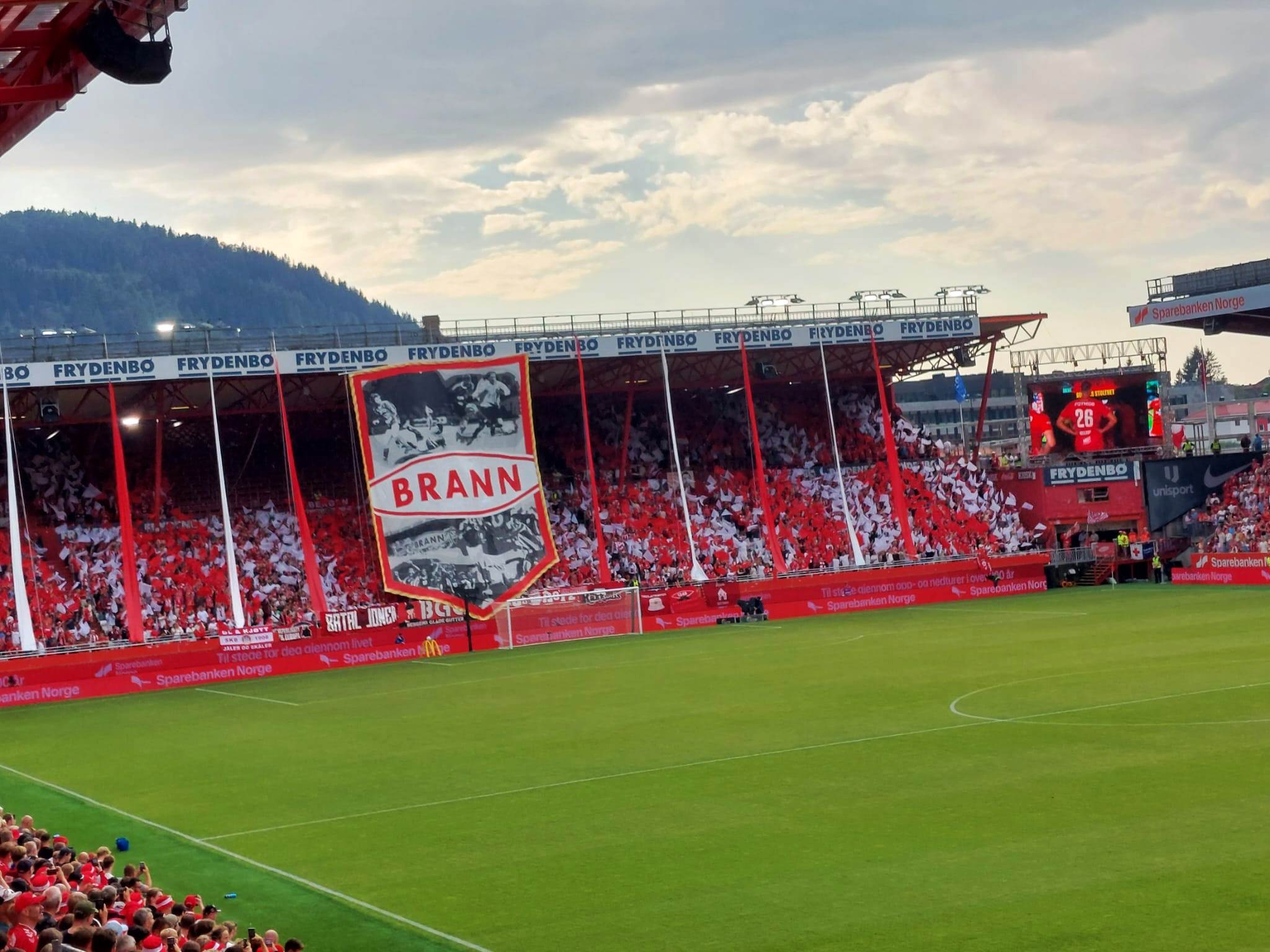
Brann supporters cheer before the start of a UEFA Champions League qualification match against FC Red Bull Salzburg in July 2025

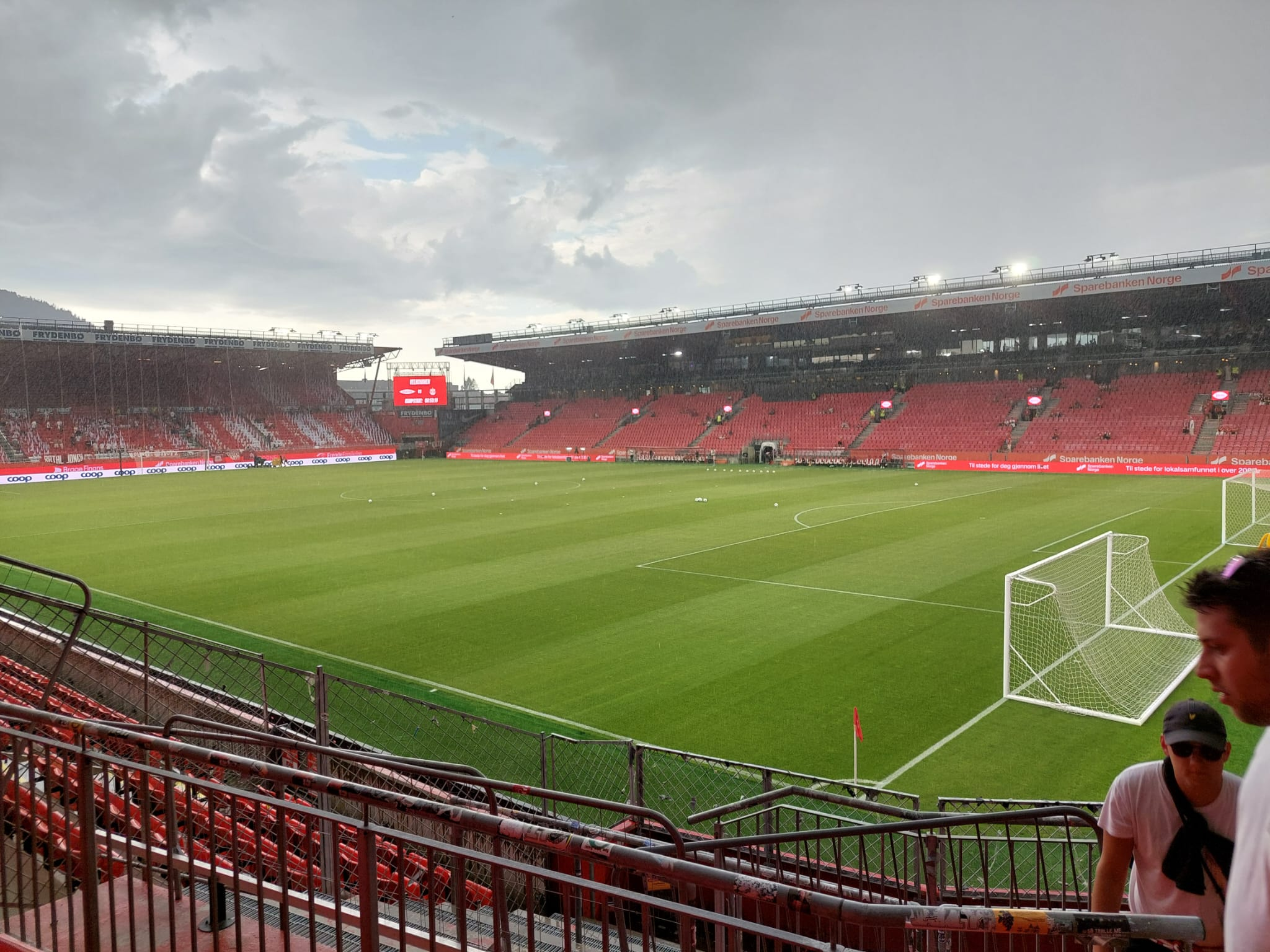
July 2025

== Bibliography ==
- Berstad, Jacob (1938). Brann gjennem 30 år. Garnæs' boktrykkeri.
