= List of football stadiums in Sweden =

This is a list of football stadiums in Sweden, ranked in order of capacity, with the minimum capacity being 4,000.

There are many football stadiums and pitches in Sweden, so this list is not comprehensive. It includes:

- All 64 clubs in the top three tiers of the Swedish football league system as of the 2021 season (Allsvenskan, Superettan, Division 1 Norra and Division 1 Södra).

== Current stadiums ==
#	Image	Stadium	Capacity	City	Home team	UEFA rank	Ref
1		Strawberry Arena	50,000	Stockholm	Sweden men's national football team, AIK Fotboll	4/4 stars	
2		Ullevi	43,000	Gothenburg	none		
3		3Arena	31,000	Stockholm	Djurgårdens IF, Hammarby	4/4 stars	
4		Malmö Stadion	26,500	Malmö	IFK Malmö		
5		Eleda Stadion	22,500	Malmö	Malmö FF	4/4 stars	
6		Gamla Ullevi	18,416	Gothenburg	Sweden women's national football team, IFK Göteborg, GAIS, Örgryte IS	4/4 stars	
7		Olympia	16,500	Helsingborg	Helsingborgs IF		
8		Östgötaporten	16,000	Norrköping	IFK Norrköping, IK Sleipner		
9		Borås Arena	14,500	Borås	IF Elfsborg, Norrby IF		
10		Värendsvallen	13,800	Växjö	none		
11		Behrn Arena	13,129	Örebro	Örebro SK		
12		Guldfågeln Arena	12,150	Kalmar	Kalmar FF		
13		Visma Arena	12,000	Växjö	Östers IF		
14		Ryavallen	12,000	Borås	none		
15		Örjans Vall	10,873	Halmstad	Halmstads BK		
16		Studenternas IP	10,522	Uppsala	IK Sirius		
17		Vångavallen	10,000	Trelleborg	Trelleborgs FF		
18		Landskrona IP	10,000	Landskrona	Landskrona BoIS		
19		Tingvalla IP	10,000	Karlstad	Carlstad United		
20		Linköping Arena	8,500	Linköping	Linköpings FC		
21		Jämtkraft Arena	8,466	Östersund	Östersunds FK		
22		Kopparvallen	8,300	Åtvidaberg	Åtvidabergs FF		
23		T3 Arena	8,000	Umeå	Umeå FC		
24		Starke Arvid Arena	8,000	Ljungskile	Ljungskile SK		
25		Tunavallen	7,800	Eskilstuna	AFC Eskilstuna, Eskilstuna United DFF		
26		Norrporten Arena	7,700	Sundsvall	GIF Sundsvall		
27		Stora Valla	7,500	Degerfors	Degerfors IF		
28		Strandvallen	7,000	Hällevik	Mjällby AIF		
29		Bravida Arena	6,500	Gothenburg	BK Häcken		
30		Gavlevallen	6,500	Gävle	Gefle IF		
31		Domnarvsvallen	6,500	Borlänge	IK Brage, Dalkurd FF		
32		Södertälje Fotbollsarena	6,400	Södertälje	Syrianska FC, Assyriska FF		
33		Stadsparksvallen	5,500	Jönköping	Jönköpings Södra IF		
34		Falcon Alkoholfri Arena	5,500	Falkenberg	Falkenbergs FF		
35		Grimsta IP	5,100	Vällingby	IF Brommapojkarna		
36		Finnvedsvallen	5,070	Värnamo	IFK Värnamo		
37		Gutavallen	5,000	Visby	FC Gute		
38		Hitachi Energy Arena	7,044	Västerås	Västerås SK		
39		Påskbergsvallen	4,575	Varberg	Varbergs BoIS FC		
40		Ängelholms IP	4,000	Ängelholm	Ängelholms FF		

== Stadiums under construction ==
#	Image	Stadium	Capacity	City	Home team	Start/end

== See also ==
- Football in Sweden
- List of indoor arenas in Sweden
- Record home attendances of Swedish football clubs
- List of stadiums in the Nordic countries by capacity
- List of European stadiums by capacity
- List of association football stadiums by capacity
- List of association football stadiums by country
- List of sports venues by capacity
- List of stadiums by capacity
- Lists of stadiums
