= List of football stadiums in Finland =

The following is a list of football stadiums in Finland, ranked in order of capacity, with the minimum capacity being 1,500.

== Current stadiums ==
| # | Image | Stadium | Capacity | City | Home team | Opened | Ref |
|---|---|---|---|---|---|---|---|
| 1 | | Helsinki Olympic Stadium | 36,200 | Helsinki | Finland national football team | 1938 | |
| 2 | | Tampere Stadium (Ratina Stadion) | 16,800 | Tampere | | 1966 | |
| 3 | | Paavo Nurmi Stadium | 13,000 | Turku | | 1893 | |
| 4 | | Bolt Arena | 10,770 | Helsinki | HJK, Finland women's national football team | 2000 | |
| 5 | | Veritas Stadion | 9,372 | Turku | Inter Turku, TPS | 1952 | |
| 6 | | Tammelan Stadion | 8,000 | Tampere | Ilves, Tampere United, Tampereen Pallo-Veikot | 2024 | |
| 7 | | Lahden Stadion | 7,465 seating, 7,000 standing | Lahti | FC Lahti | 1981 | |
| 8 | | Hietalahti Stadium (Lemonsoft Stadion) | 6,009 | Vaasa | VPS, Vasa IFK | 1935 | |
| 9 | | OmaSp Stadion | 5,817 | Seinäjoki | SJK | 2016 | |
| 10 | | Kaarlen Kenttä | 5,500 | Vaasa | FC Kiisto | 1986 | |
| 11 | | Heinäpään jalkapallostadion | 5,080 | Oulu | AC Oulu | 2026 | |
| 12 | | Väre Areena | 5,000 | Kuopio | KuPS | 1939 | |
| 13 | | Kimpinen | 4,900 | Lappeenranta | PEPO | 1939 | |
| 14 | | Arto Tolsa Areena | 4,780 | Kotka | KTP | 1952 | |
| 15 | | Myyrmäen jalkapallostadion | 4,700 | Vantaa | VJS, PK-35 Vantaa (women) | 2000 | |
| 16 | | Harjun Stadion | 4,500 | Jyväskylä | JJK | 1926 | |
| 17 | | Raatti Stadium | 4,400 | Oulu | AC Oulu (–2026) | 1953 | |
| 18 | | Kymenlaakson Sähkö Stadion | 4,167 | Kouvola | MYPA | 1995 | |
| 19 | | Porin Stadion | 4,094 seating, 8,206 standing | Pori | FC Jazz | 1966 | |
| 20 | | Mikkelin Urheilupuisto | 4,000 | Mikkeli | MP, MiPK | 1916 | |
| 21 | | Project Liv Arena | 3,600 | Jacobstad | FF Jaro | 2025 | |
| 22 | | Kokkola Areena | 3,000 | Kokkola | KPV, GBK Kokkola | 2026 | |
| 23 | | Tehtaan kenttä | 3,516 | Valkeakoski | FC Haka | 1934 | |
| 24 | | Lahden kisapuisto | 3,187 | Lahti | | 1952 | |
| 25 | | Kokkolan keskuskenttä | 3,000 | Kokkola | | 1935 | |
| 26 | | Rovaniemen keskuskenttä | 2,800 | Rovaniemi | RoPS | 1953 | |
| 27 | | Oulunkylä Stadium | 2,700 | Helsinki | IF Gnistan | 2025 | |
| 28 | | Jakobstads Centralplan | 2,000 | Jakobstad | FF Jaro | 1971 | |
| 29 | | Wiklöf Holding Arena | 1,635 | Mariehamn | IFK Mariehamn | 1932 | |
| 30 | | Järvenpään keskuskenttä | 1,500 | Järvenpää | JäPS | 2024 | |

== Future stadiums ==
=== New planned stadiums ===
| Stadium | Capacity | Home team | City | Opening | Notes | Cite |
|---|---|---|---|---|---|---|
| Tapiolan urheilupuisto | 6,000 | FC Honka | Espoo | 2029 | Construction set to begin in 2026 | |
| Oulunkylä Stadium | 8,000 | IF Gnistan | Helsinki | | Proposed | |

=== Stadiums under construction ===
| Stadium | Capacity | Home team | City | Opening | Notes | Cite |

== See also ==
- List of stadiums in the Nordic countries by capacity
- List of European stadiums by capacity
- List of association football stadiums by capacity
- List of association football stadiums by country
- List of sports venues by capacity
- List of stadiums by capacity
- Lists of stadiums
