= List of football stadiums in Iceland =

This is a list of football stadiums in Iceland, ranked in order of capacity, with the minimum capacity being 250.

== Current stadiums ==
| # | Image | Stadium | Capacity | City | Home team |
|---|---|---|---|---|---|
| 1 | | Laugardalsvöllur | 9,800 | Reykjavík | Iceland |
| 2 | | Kaplakriki | 3,050 | Hafnarfjörður | FH |
| 3 | | Fylkisvöllur | 1,854 | Reykjavík | Fylkir |
| 4 | | Kópavogsvöllur | 1,709 | Kópavogur | Breiðablik |
| 5 | | Akureyrarvöllur | 1,645 | Akureyri | KA |
| 6 | | Framvöllur | 1,600 | Reykjavík | Fram Reykjavík |
| 7 | | KR-völlur | 1,541 | Reykjavík | KR |
| 8 | | Grindavíkurvöllur | 1,500 | Grindavík | Grindavík |
| 9 | | Hásteinsvöllur | 1,500 | Vestmannaeyjar | ÍBV |
| 10 | | Kórinn | 1,452 | Kópavogur | HK |
| 11 | | Víkingsvöllur | 1,450 | Reykjavík | Víkingur |
| 12 | | Hlíðarendi | 1,201 | Reykjavík | Valur, Haukar |
| 13 | | Keflavíkurvöllur | 1,100 | Keflavík | Keflavík |
| 14 | | Stjörnuvöllur | 1,000 | Garðabær | Stjarnan |
| 15 | | Fjölnisvöllur | 1,000 | Reykjavík | Fjölnir |
| 16 | | Akranesvöllur | 900 | Akranes | ÍA |
| 17 | | Valbjarnarvöllur | 600 | Reykjavík | Knattspyrnufélagið Þróttur |
| 18 | | Njarðtaksvöllurinn | 500 | Reykjanesbær | Njarðvík |
| 19 | | Vilhjálmsvöllur | 500 | Egilsstaðir | Höttur |
| 20 | | Dalvíkurvöllur | 400 | Dalvík | Dalvík/Reynir |
| 21 | | Leiknisvöllur | 300 | Reykjavík | Leiknir Reykjavík |

== See also ==
- Football in Iceland
- List of football clubs in Iceland
- List of stadiums in the Nordic countries by capacity
- List of European stadiums by capacity
- List of association football stadiums by capacity
