= Lambertseter Stadion =

Multi-purpose stadium in Norway

Coordinates: 59°52′17.26″N 10°49′9.02″E

Lambertseter stadion
- Lambertseter idrettspark
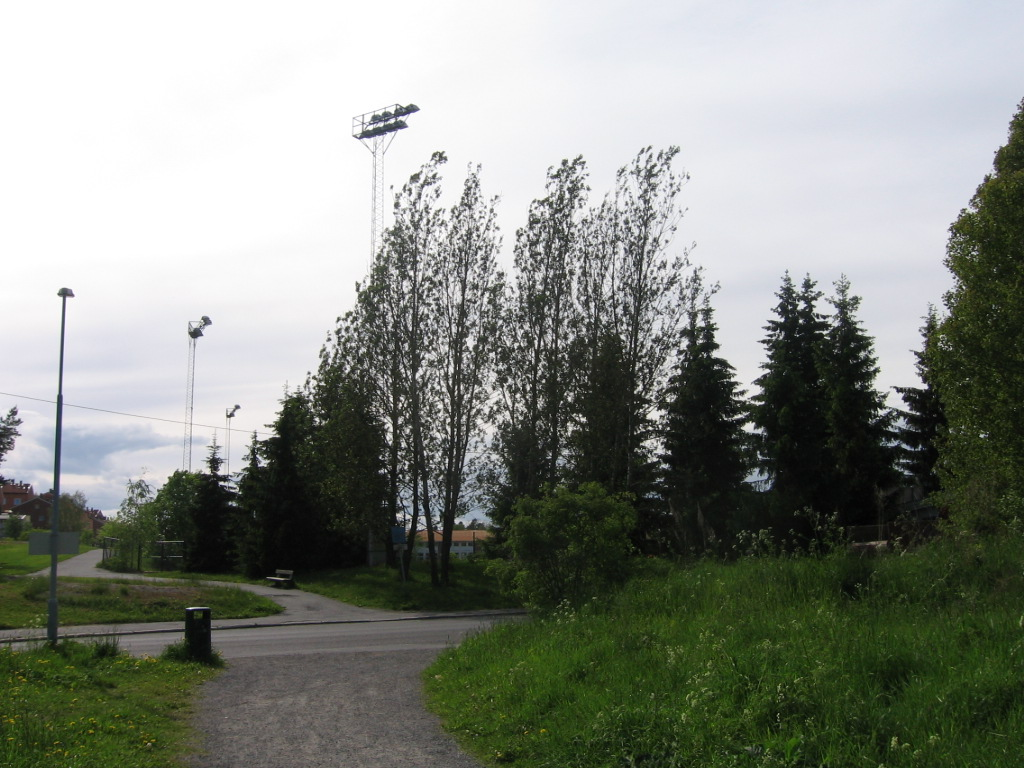
- Interactive map of Lambertseter stadion
- Location: Lambertseter, Oslo
- Capacity: c. 2000, standing only
- Surface: Grass
- Field size: 112 * 72 yards

Tenants
- Lambertseter IF (track and field)

Lambertseter stadion (Lambertseter idrettspark) is a multi-purpose stadium in the Oslo borough of Nordstrand.

The pitch surrounded by a running track, Lambertseter stadion was used as the main track and field stadium in Oslo while Bislett stadion was renovated in 2004.

The stadium has a small clubhouse/changing area, and in winter a natural ice rink is built. There is no seating, and only a small area of terracing along one side of the ground.

== See also ==
- Lambertseter
- Lambertseter (station)
- Lambertseter line

== Photos ==
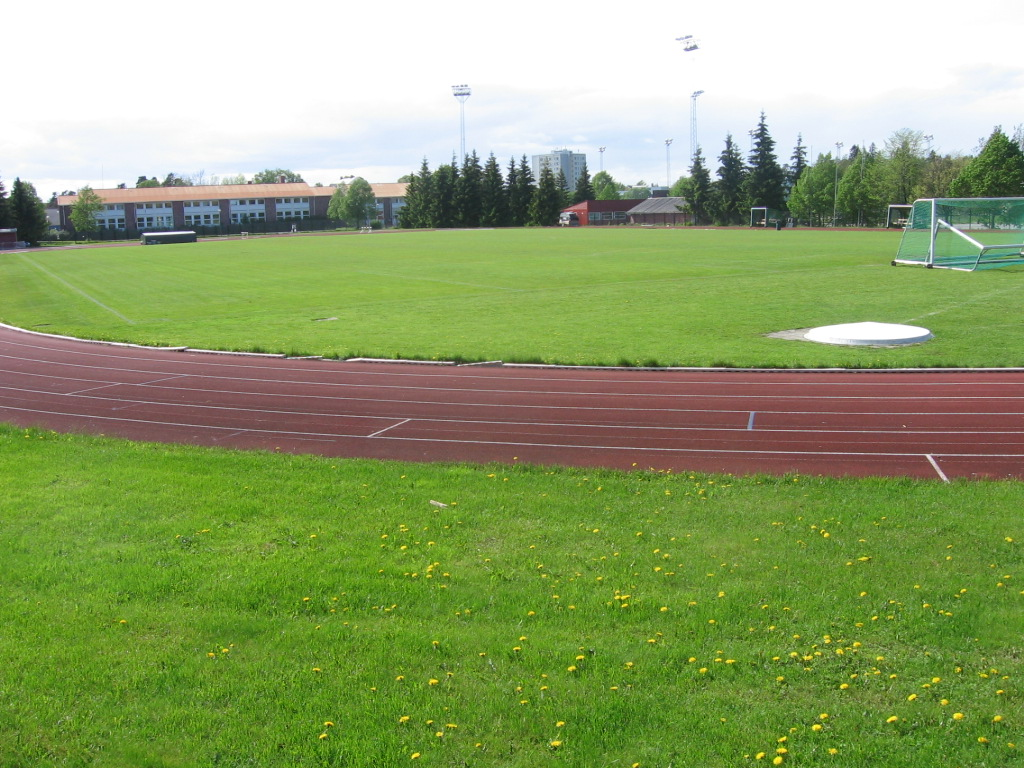
The pitch

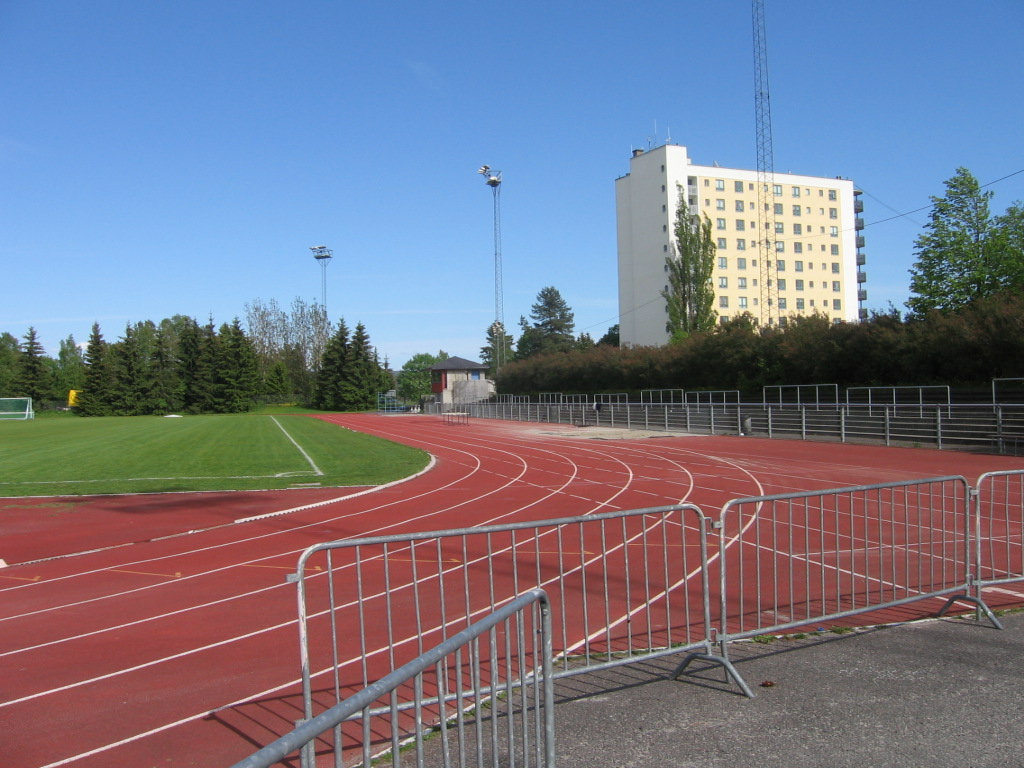
Stadium terracing area and running track
