= Fjordkraft =

Norwegian utility firm

Fjordkraft ASA
- Type: Allmennaksjeselskap
- Traded as: OSE: FKRAFT
- Industry: Power
- Founded: 1996
- Headquarters: Bergen, Norway,
- Area served: Norway
- Key people: Rolf Barmen(CEO); Wenche Teigland (Chairman)
- Revenue: ▲NOK 4487 million (2016)
- Operating income: NOK 303 million (2016)
- Net income: NOK 303 million (2016)
- Number of employees: 195 (2016)
- Website: www.fjordkraft.no

Fjordkraft is a Norwegian power company that delivers power to end users.

== Overview ==
The company took over the retailing function from BKK and Skagerak Energi, which along with Statkraft own the company. Power is bought on Nord Pool Spot. The power grid and production facilities are retained by the owners. The company is based in Bergen, with its other two regional offices in Sandefjord and Trondheim.

== Partnerships ==
ONZO, a London-based Data Science Software Company announced a 5-year partnership with Fjordkraft, in 2015.
