= Lambertseter =

Suburb of Oslo, Norway

Coordinates: 59°52′N 10°48′E

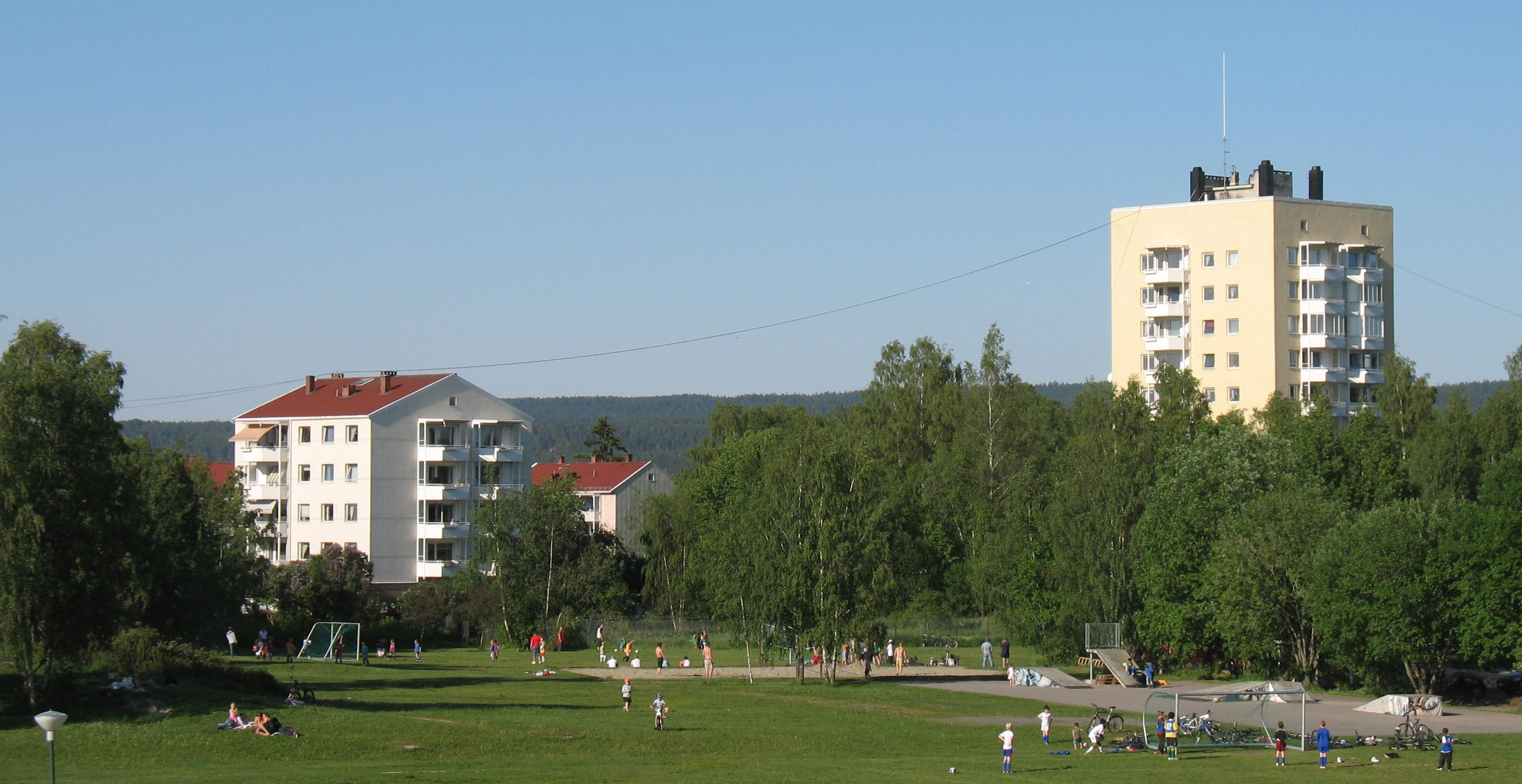
Lambertseter football fields and apartment blocks

Lambertseter is a suburb of the city of Oslo, Norway, and is part of the borough of Nordstrand.

Lambertseter was built over a short period starting from 1951, and was the very first modern suburb of Oslo. A Tram line was built to the neighborhood in 1957 and the Oslo T-bane metro system came in 1966, serving the Lambertseter station.

Lambertseter was also the name of a borough of Oslo until 1 January 2004.

Lambertseter also has a multi-use sports Stadium.
