= Norwegian Players' Association =

The Norwegian Players' Association (Norwegian: Norske Idrettsutøveres Sentralorganisasjon or NISO) is a trade union for professional football, handball and ice hockey players in Norway. Established in 1995, it is member of the Norwegian Confederation of Trade Unions.

It was established in 1995, after Morgan Andersen and Rolf Herman Longnes had made preparations for one year.
