= Kråmyra Stadion =

Football stadium in Ålesund, Norway

Coordinates: 62°28′33″N 6°11′3″E

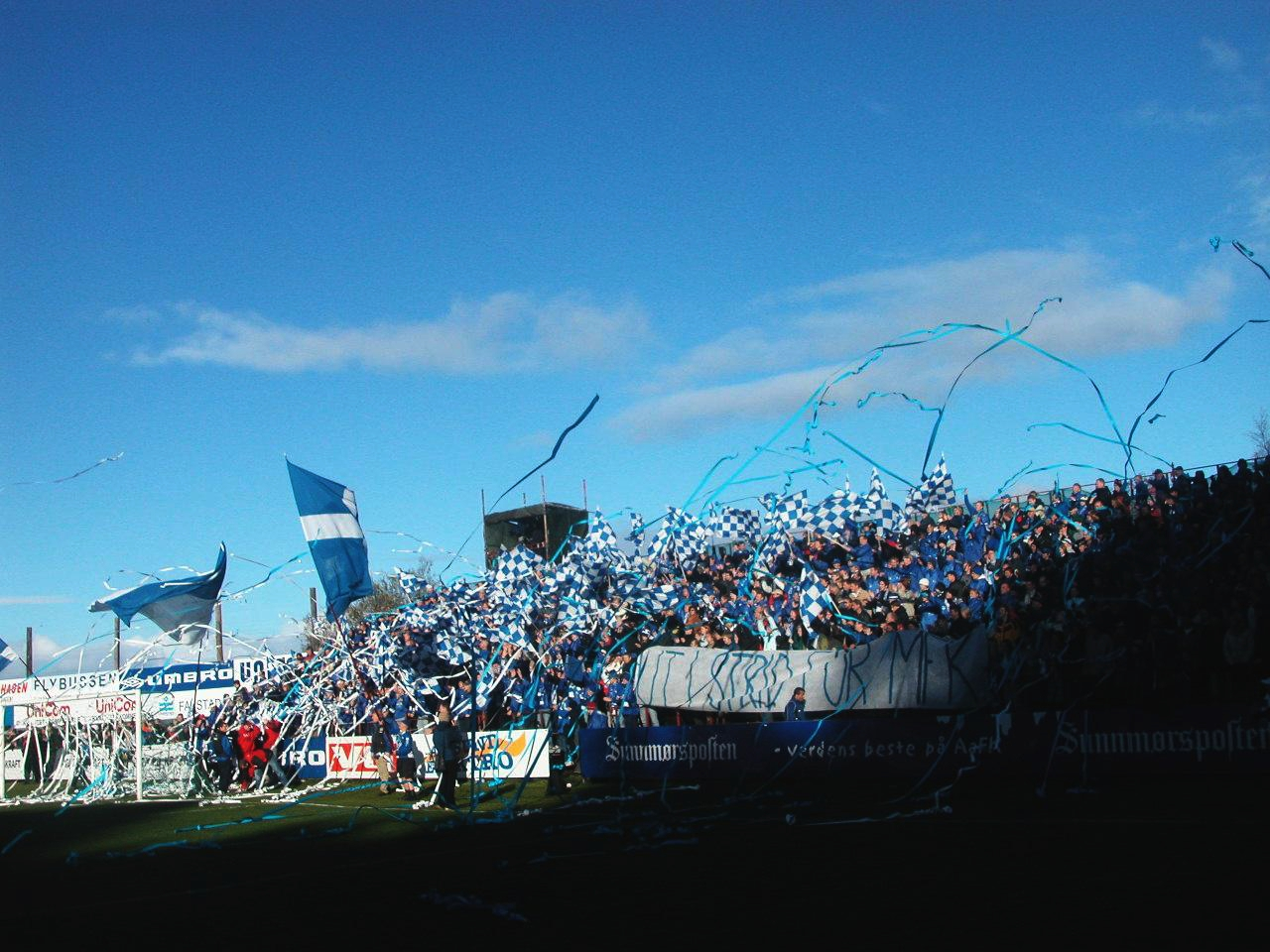
Molde FK supports Tornekrattet at Kråmyra in 2003

Kråmyra Stadion was a football stadium in the city in Ålesund, Norway. It served as the home ground of Aalesunds FK from 1977 until the opening of Color Line Stadium in April 2005. It had a capacity of 11,000 people. The venue hosted Norway national under-21 football team matches twice: in a 5–0 defear to Sweden on 8 August 1972 and 3–1 victory over Finland on 27 April 1982.

== History ==
Aalesunds FK began planning a football ground at Kråmyra in 1946 because the training time allocated to the club at Nørvebana was considered insufficient. The area, formally known as Torvlømyra, was a bog that proved more difficult and expensive to develop than initially expected. The club applied for football-related funding, grants and interest-free loans from the Norwegian Football Federation. It also raised money for the project through local initiatives, including renting the site to a travelling fair, raffling a motorboat and holding a tombola.

Kråmyra was first used as a training ground in 1955. The municipality later contributed funding for leasing and maintenance. In the 1970s, the pitch was expanded and a stand was built on the north side of the ground. Five-year advertising-board agreements on the opposite side of the pitch helped finance the stand, which had space for 1,500 spectators and was completed for the opening match against Kristiansund FK in the spring of 1977. Kråmyra then replaced Aksla Stadion as Aalesunds FK's home ground.

Aalesunds FK played its final match at Kråmyra on 24 October 2004, defeating Kongsvinger 3–1 before moving to Color Line Stadion in 2005. The former stadium site was subsequently redeveloped for housing.
