= Skagerak Energi =

Norwegian utility company

Skagerak Energi AS
- Type: Private
- Industry: Power
- Founded: 2001
- Headquarters: Porsgrunn, Norway
- Area served: Vestfold and Grenland, Norway
- Revenue: ▲NOK 2,662 million (2006)
- Operating income: NOK 1,814 million (2006)
- Net income: NOK 842 million (2006)
- Number of employees: 600 (2007)
- Parent: Statkraft (66.62%)
- Website: www.skagerakenergi.no

Skagerak Energi is a Norwegian utility company. The company's main focus is production and distribution of electrical power and other energy, in addition to business areas related to this. The group has about 600 employees, and an annual power production of 5 TWh, about 176,000 grid customers, and an annual revenue of NOK 2 billion.

Skagerak does not sell electricity to end-users, but is a co-owner in the end-user power company Fjordkraft. Skagerak Energi is a part of Statkraft Group, and is owned 66.62% by Statkraft Regional Holding, and 33.38% by the towns in the Grenland region in Norway. It operates 17 wholly owned and 28 partially hydroelectric power plants.

Skagerak Energi is a major sponsor of the first-division Norwegian football team Odd Grenland.

== History ==
The company was founded on 1 January 2001 as a merger between Skiensfjordens kommunale kraftselskap (SKK) and Vestfold Kraft. The latter had been purchasing all the power grid companies throughout Vestfold in 1999 and 2000 while had bought Telekraft in 1999. Statkraft bought 34% of both companies in 2000 and later all but the municipalities in Grenland have sold their ownership in Skagerak to Statkraft.
