= Guldbergaunet Stadion =

Football stadium in Steinkjer, Norway

Coordinates: 64.0215°N 11.5105°E

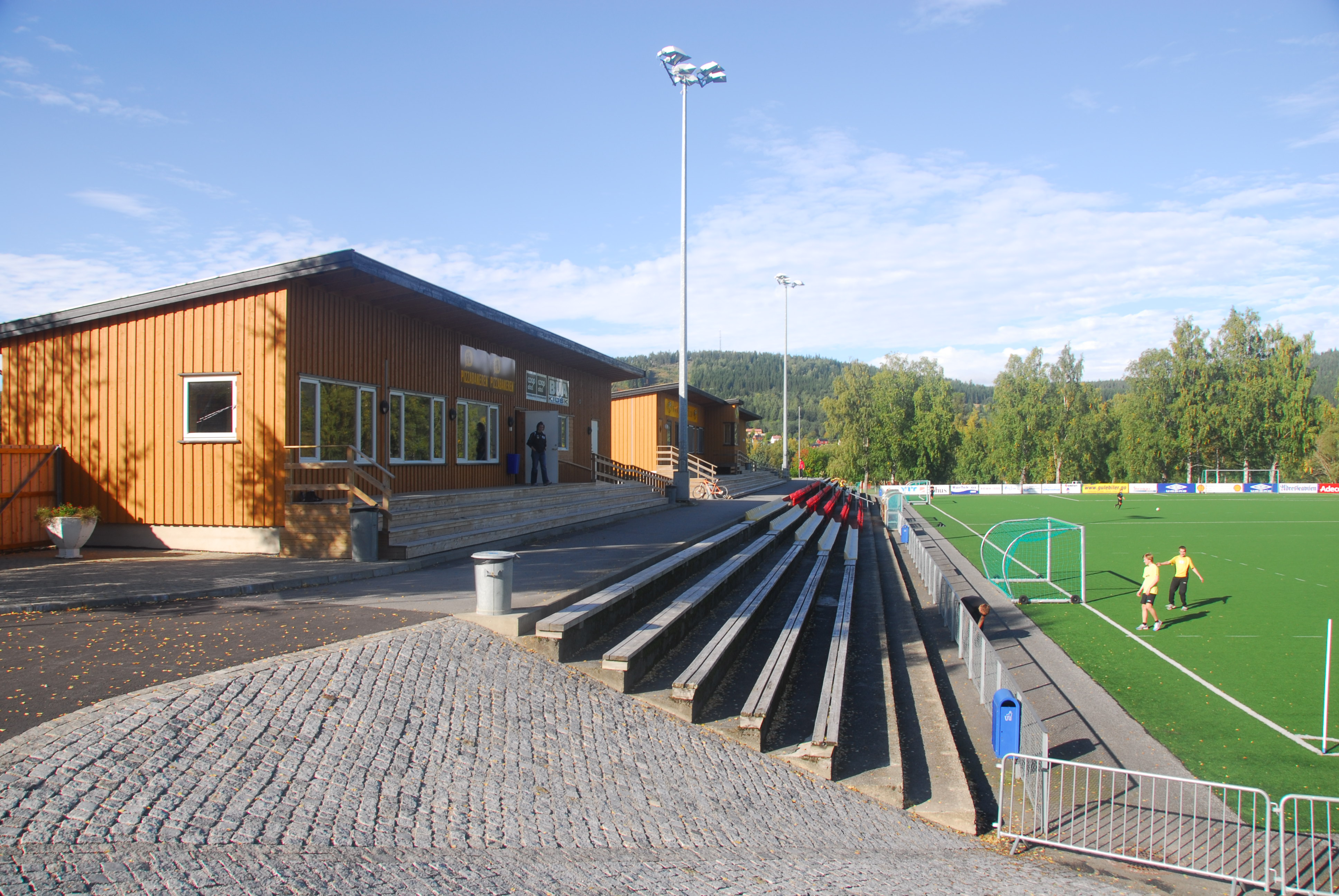
The stands

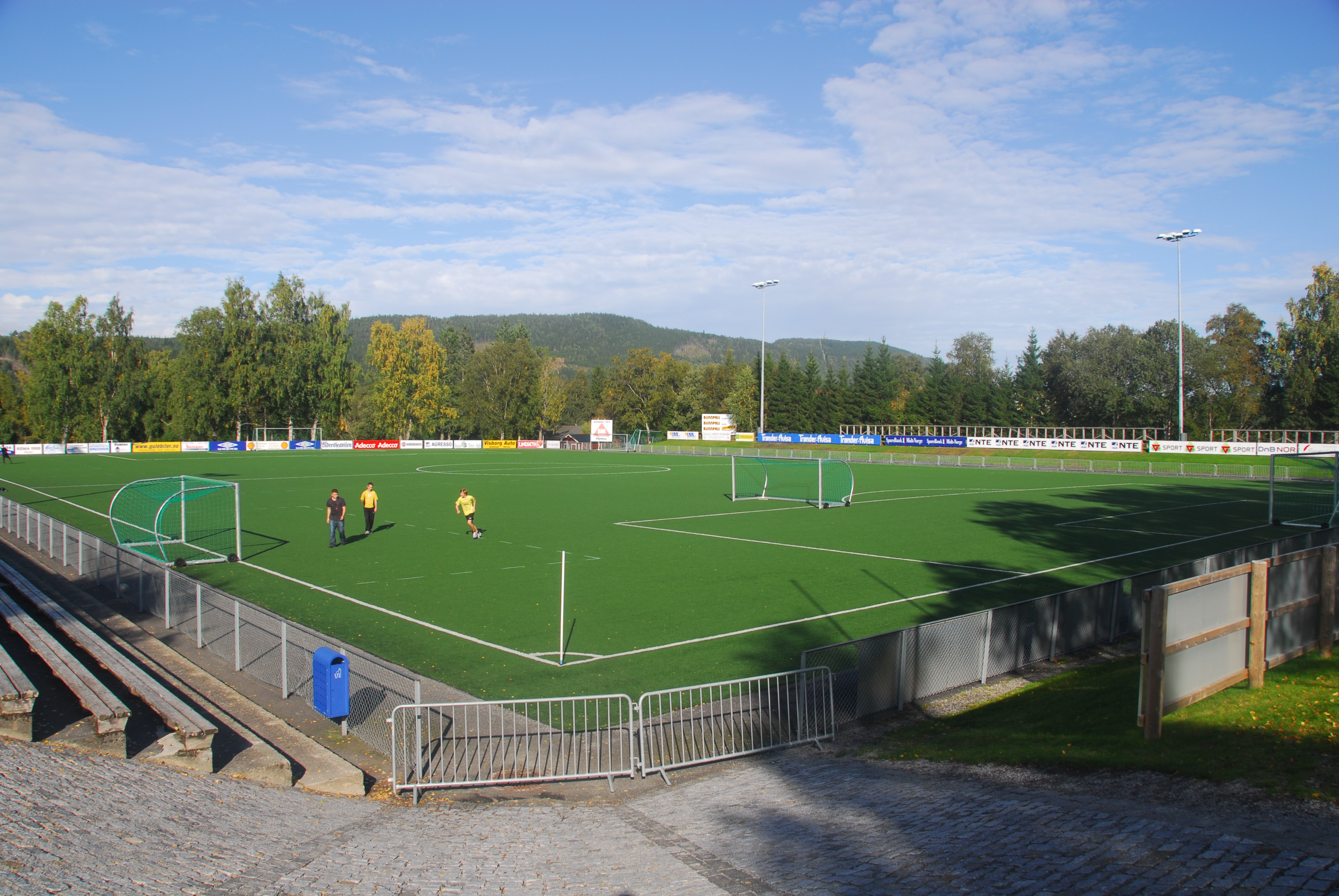
The playing field

Gulbergaunet stadion is an association football venue in Steinkjer Municipality in Norway.

The all-time record attendance is 13,997 when Steinkjer FK played against Lyn (and lost 1–0) in the Norwegian Football Cup semi final in 1970. The venue hosted the Norwegian Athletics Championships in 1978 and 2000. In 2003, the field was rebuilt with artificial turf.
