= Storstadion =

Sports venue in Sandefjord, Norway

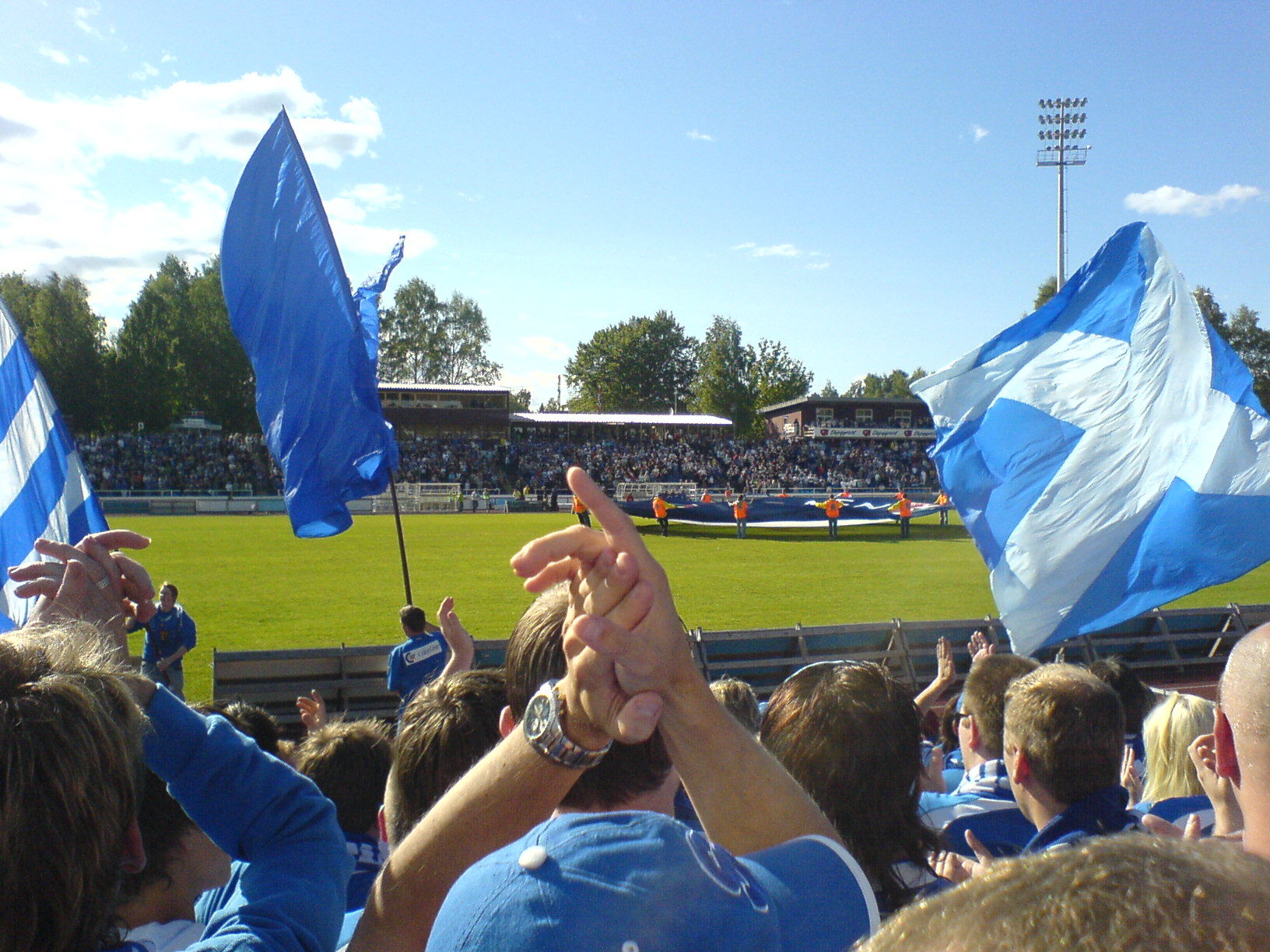
- Interactive map of Storstadion
- Location: Bugårdsparken, Sandefjord
- Coordinates: 59°7′58″N 10°11′27″E
- Owner: Municipality of Sandefjord
- Operator: Municipality of Sandefjord
- Capacity: 2,000 (seats)
- Surface: Grass

Construction
- Opened: 1969

Tenants
- Sandefjord BK (1969–present); Sandefjord Fotball (1999–2007); Sandefjord TIF (athletics)

Storstadion is a multi-purpose stadium in Sandefjord, Norway. It was the home ground of Sandefjord Fotball until the summer of 2007. It is currently used mostly for track and field meets and football matches, and is the home ground of Sandefjord Ballklubb. The stadium's capacity is approximately 7,000 of which 2,000 is seated. The stadium was built in 1969.

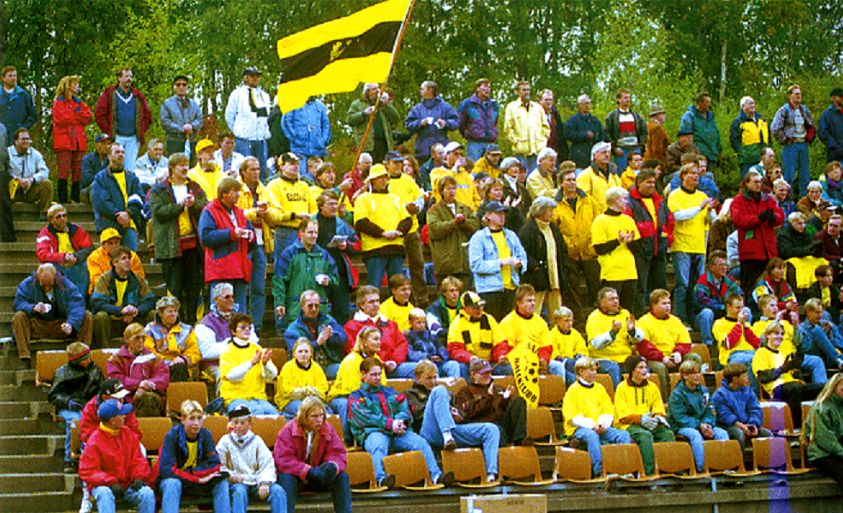
Sandefjord Ballklubb - Jevnaker IF 1.okt 1995

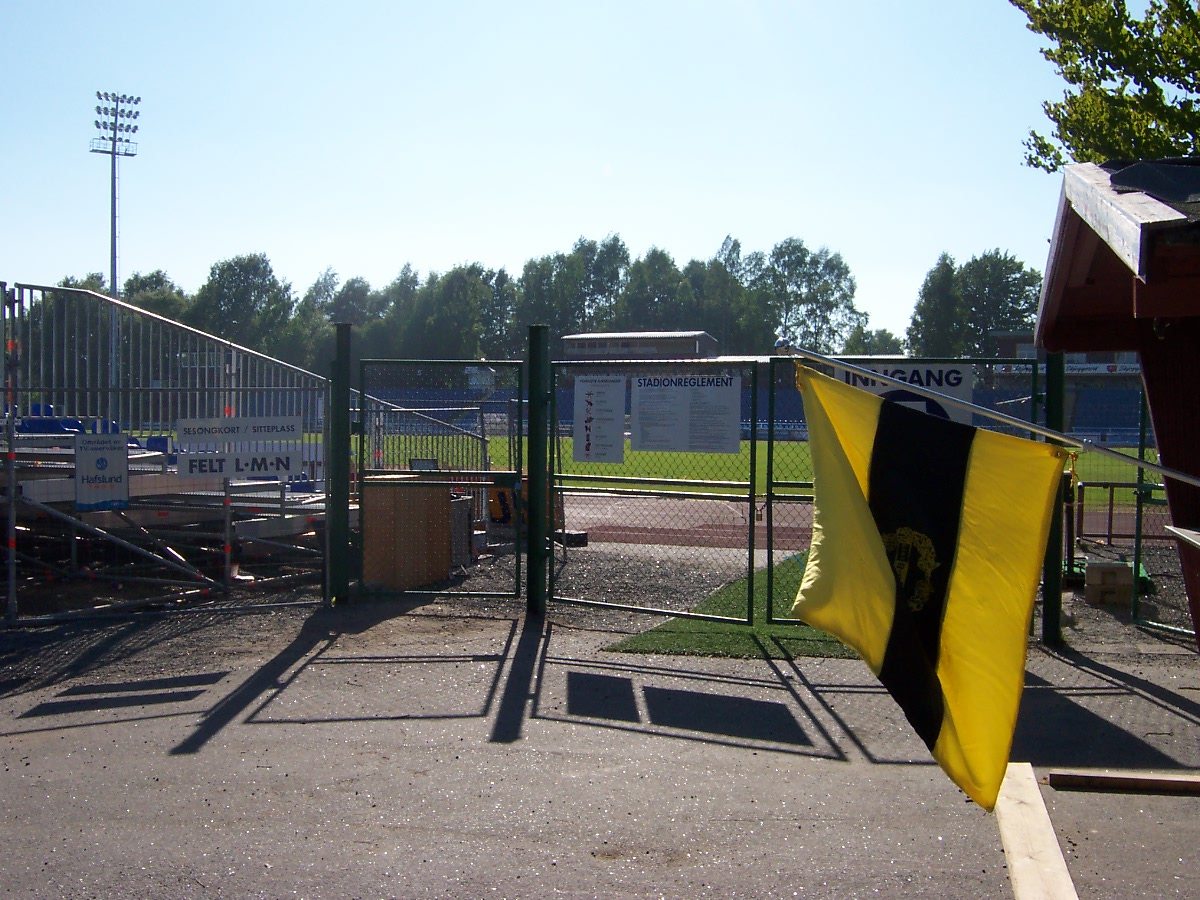
A Sandefjord Ballklubb flag at Storstadion in 2006

The venue has hosted Norway national under-21 football team matches three times, playing 0–2 against Sweden on 30 June 1975, 3–0 against Switzerland on 11 September 1984 and 1–1 against Netherlands on 20 May 2002. Sandefjord Fotball played one and a half top division seasons, a total of 20 games, at Storstadion. On 1 July 2007, they played their last home game at Storstadion against Lillestrøm.

In 2006, the municipality of Sandefjord approved Sandefjord Fotball's request to build a new stadium at Pindsle, The new arena was named Komplett Arena and has hosted Sandefjord Fotball's home games since 21 July 2007.
