= 2025 Aalesunds FK season =

Aalesund
2025 season
- Chairman: Jan Petter Hagen
- Manager: Kjetil Rekdal
- Stadium: Color Line Stadion
- 1. divisjon: 4th
- Promotion play-offs: Winners
- 2025 Norwegian Cup: Quarter-finals
- 2025–26 Norwegian Cup: Third round
Home colours	Away colours

The 2025 season was the 111th in the history of Aalesunds FK and their second consecutive season in the second tier of Norwegian football. The club competed in the Norwegian First Division and the Norwegian Football Cup.

== Transfers ==
=== In ===
Pos.	Player	Transferred from	Fee	Date	Source
DF	(Iceland) Ólafur Gudmundsson	(Iceland) FH Hafnarfjördur	Undisclosed	3 January 2025	
DF	(Norway) Aleksander Hammer Kjelsen	(Norway) Vålerenga	Undisclosed	4 March 2025	
FW	(Denmark) Frederik Heiselberg	(Denmark) Midtjylland	Undisclosed	4 March 2025	
DF	(Norway) Jakob Nyland Ørsahl	(Norway) Raufoss		24 June 2025	
MF	(Greenland) Mathias Christensen	(Denmark) Helsingør		3 July 2025	
DF	(Norway) Nikolai Skuseth	(Norway) Sarpsborg 08	Loan	29 August 2025	

=== Out ===
Pos.	Player	Transferred to	Fee	Date	Source
FW	(Philippines) Bjørn Martin Kristensen	(Norway) KFUM Oslo	€200,000	30 January 2025	

== Friendlies ==
=== Pre-season ===
8 February 2025 Friendly	Aalesund (Norway)	1–1	(Norway) Hødd
16:00

15 February 2025 Friendly	Ranheim (Norway)	3–4	(Norway) Aalesund	Ranheim
14:00		Report		Stadium: EXTRA Arena

22 February 2025 Friendly	Aalesund (Norway)	6–1	(Norway) Levanger
13:00

1 March 2025 Friendly	Aalesund (Norway)	1–2	(Norway) Sogndal
13:00

8 March 2025 Friendly	Aalesund (Norway)	1–0	(Norway) Tromsø
15:00	Heiselberg 29'

11 March 2025 Friendly	Lyn (Norway)	4–5	(Norway) Aalesund
17:00

23 March 2025 Friendly	Kristiansund (Norway)	2–1	(Norway) Aalesund
16:00

== Competitions ==
=== Overview ===
Competition	First match	Last match	Starting round	Final position	Record							
Competition	First match	Last match	Starting round	Final position	Pld	W	D	L	GF	GA	GD	Win %
Norwegian First Division	31 March 2025	8 November 2025	Matchday 1	4th	30	14	10	6	56	35	+21	46.67
Promotion play-offs	26 November 2025	30 November 2025	Round 2	Winners	4	3	0	1	12	6	+6	75.00
2025 Norwegian Football Cup	12 April 2025	25 June 2025	First round	Quarter-finals	5	3	1	1	9	5	+4	60.00
2025–26 Norwegian Football Cup	13 August 2025	24 September 2025	First round	The competition is to be concluded next season	3	3	0	0	9	3	+6	100.00
Total					42	23	11	8	86	49	+37	54.76

Source: Competitions

=== First Division ===
==== League table ====
Pos	Team	Pld	W	D	L	GF	GA	GD	Pts	Promotion, qualification or relegation
2	Start (P)	30	16	7	7	58	35	+23	55	Promotion to Eliteserien
3	Kongsvinger	30	15	9	6	61	42	+19	54	Qualification for the promotion play-offs third round
4	Aalesund (O, P)	30	14	10	6	56	35	+21	52	Qualification for the promotion play-offs second round
5	Egersund	30	15	7	8	51	38	+13	52	Qualification for the promotion play-offs first round
6	Ranheim	30	14	6	10	48	48	0	48	Qualification for the promotion play-offs first round

Source: OBOS-ligaen (in Norwegian)
Rules for classification: 1) Points; 2) Goal difference; 3) Goals scored; 4) Head-to-head points; 5) Head-to-head goal difference; 6) Head-to-head goals scored.
(O) Play-off winners; (P) Promoted

==== Results summary ====
Overall								Home						Away					
Pld	W	D	L	GF	GA	GD	Pts	W	D	L	GF	GA	GD	W	D	L	GF	GA	GD
30	14	10	6	56	35	+21	52	10	4	1	34	11	+23	4	6	5	22	24	−2

Source: NFF

==== Results by round ====
Round	1	2	3	4	5	6	7	8	9	10	11	12	13	14	15	16	17	18	19	20	21	22	23	24	25	26	27	28	29	30
Ground	H	A	H	A	H	A	H	H	A	H	A	H	A	H	A	H	A	A	H	A	H	A	H	A	H	A	H	A	H	A
Result	D	W	D	D	W	D	W	D	L	D	L	W	D	W	D	W	L	W	W	L	L	W	W	L	W	W	W	D	W	D
Position	6	4	7	6	4	4	3	3	6	7	9	6	6	4	4	3	5	3	3	5	6	5	5	5	5	4	4	4	4	4

Source: NFF
A = Away; H = Home; W = Win; D = Draw; L = Loss

==== Matches ====
The league schedule was released on 20 December 2024.

31 March 2025 1	Aalesund	2–2	Lillestrøm	Ålesund
19:00	Braga 4'; Snær Jóhannsson 25'		Kitolano 11'; Lehne Olsen 43'	Stadium: Color Line Stadion; Attendance: 5,003; Referee: Steinar Hauge

5 April 2025 2	Sogndal	3–4	Aalesund	Sogndal
16:00	Høyland 35'; Hovden Flataker 39'; Haugerud Hagen 90+3'		Brás 30' (o.g.); Braga 52' (pen.); Vatne Haram 72'; Snær Jóhannsson 90+4'	Stadium: Fosshaugane Campus; Attendance: 2,050; Referee: Jørgen Haugen

21 April 2025 3	Aalesund	0–0	Mjøndalen	Ålesund
17:00				Stadium: Color Line Stadion

28 April 2025 4	Åsane	0–0	Aalesund	Bergen
19:00				Stadium: Åsane Arena

3 May 2025 5	Aalesund	3–1	Raufoss	Ålesund
16:00

16 May 2025 7	Aalesund	2–0	Hødd

24 May 2025 8	Aalesund	1–1	IK Start

31 May 2025 9	Ranheim	2–1	Aalesund

15 June 2025 10	Aalesund	2–2	Stabæk

18 June 2025 11	Kongsvinger	3–0	Aalesund

21 June 2025 12	Aalesund	1–0	Odd

28 June 2025 13	Skeid	1–1	Aalesund

22 July 2025 6	Egersund	2–2	Aalesund

26 July 2025 14	Aalesund	2–0	Moss

30 July 2025 15	Lyn	2–2	Aalesund

2 August 2025 16	Aalesund	3–1	Kongsvinger

6 August 2025 18	Stabæk	1–2	Aalesund

10 August 2025 17	Lillestrøm	5–1	Aalesund

18 August 2025 19	Aalesund	6–0	Ranheim

23 August 2025 20	IK Start	3–1	Aalesund

31 August 2025 21	Aalesund	2–3	Egersund

13 September 2025 22	Raufoss	0–1	Aalesund

20 September 2025 23	Aalesund	3–0	Skeid

29 September 2025 24	Odd	1–0	Aalesund

4 October 2025 25	Aalesund	2–0	Sogndal

18 October 2025 26	Mjøndalen	0–6	Aalesund

22 October 2025 27	Aalesund	2–1	Lyn

25 October 2025 28	Moss	1–1	Aalesund

1 November 2025 29	Aalesund	3–0	Åsane

8 November 2025 30	Hødd	0–0	Aalesund

==== Promotion play-offs ====
26 November 2025 Round 2	Aalesund	3–1 (a.e.t.)	Egersund

30 November 2025 Round 3	Kongsvinger	4–5 (a.e.t.)	Aalesund

7 December 2025 Final First leg	Bryne	0–4	Aalesund

11 December 2025 Final Second leg	Aalesund	0–1 (4–1 agg.)	Bryne

=== Norwegian Football Cup ===
12 April 2025 First round	Rollon	0–3	Aalesund	Ålesund
16:00				Stadium: Fjordlaks Arena Kunstgress; Referee: Torgeir Halsen

24 April 2025 Second round	Ull/Kisa	2–3	Aalesund	Jessheim
18:00	Markus Flores 37'; Jakob Rømo Skille 44'		Rex Seehusen 9'; Braga 28'; Andresen 41'	Stadium: Jessheim Stadion; Attendance: 606; Referee: Johan William Grundt

12 May 2025 Third round	Aalesund	1–0	Bodø/Glimt	Ålesund
19:00				Stadium: Color Line Stadion

20 May 2025 Fourth round	Aalesund	2–2 (a.e.t.) (6–5 p)	HamKam	Ålesund
18:00

25 June 2025 Quarter-finals	Aalesund	0–1	Viking

=== 2025–26 Norwegian Football Cup ===
13 August 2025 First round	Træff	1–4	Aalesund

27 August 2025 Second round	Stjørdals-Blink	1–2	Aalesund

24 September 2025 Third round	Lysekloster	1–3	Aalesund
