= 2025 Norwegian Football Cup =

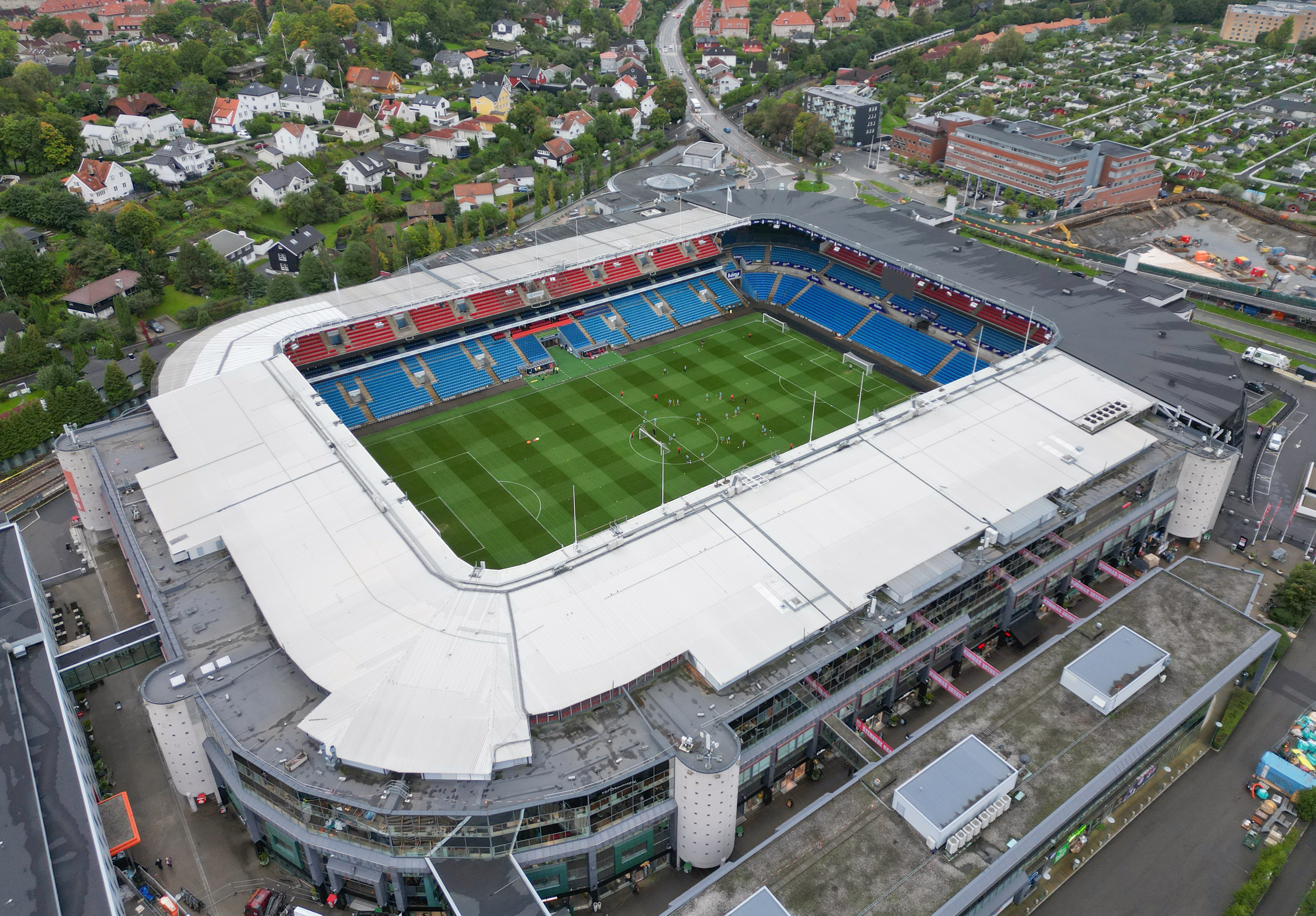
- Ullevaal Stadion hosted the final on 6 December 2025

Tournament details
- Country: Norway
- Dates: 26 March – 6 December 2025
- Teams: 128 (competition proper)

Final positions
- Champions: Lillestrøm (7th title)
- Runners-up: Sarpsborg 08

Tournament statistics
- Matches played: 127
- Goals scored: 534 (4.2 per match)
- Top goal scorer(s): Noah Holm (10 goals)

The 2025 Norwegian Football Cup was the 119th season of the Norwegian annual knock-out football tournament. It started on 26 March 2025. The final was played on 6 December 2025. The winners were supposed to play in the qualifying play-off match against the winner of 2025–26 Norwegian Football Cup for the place in 2026–27 Europa League play-off round. However, this qualifying play-off match was cancelled because Bodø/Glimt ended up winning the 2025–26 Norwegian Football Cup (whom were already qualified for the 2026–27 UEFA Champions League second qualifying round by finishing 2nd in the 2025 Eliteserien). Therefore, Lillestrøm, the winner of this tournament, will enter the 2026–27 Europa League play-off round.

== Calendar ==
Below are the dates for each round as given by the official schedule:

Round	Main date	Number of fixtures	Clubs
First round	13 April 2025	64	128 → 64
Second round	24 April 2025	32	64 → 32
Third round	7 May 2025	16	32 → 16
Fourth round	21 May 2025	8	16 → 8
Quarter-finals	25 June 2025	4	8 → 4
Semi-finals	9 July 2025	2	4 → 2
Final	6 December 2025	1	2 → 1

== First round ==
The pair-ups for the first round were announced on 28 March 2025.

Number of teams per tier entering this round
Eliteserien (1)	1. divisjon (2)	2. divisjon (3)	3. divisjon (4)	4. divisjon (5)	5. divisjon (6)	Total
16 / 16	16 / 16	27 / 27	45 / 58	24 / 139	0 / 4	128 / 260

26 March 2025	Innstranda (5)	0–8	(1) Bodø/Glimt	Bodø
18:00 CET (UTC+1)		Report	Sørli 19'; Määttä 20'; Bro Hansen 22', 34', 38'; Saltnes 27', 29'; Helmersen 75'	Stadium: Aspmyra Stadion; Attendance: 1,015; Referee: Mohammad Hafezi

11 April 2025	Os (4)	4–2	(4) Fana	Os
18:30 CEST (UTC+2)	Kvalvågnes 8', 22'; Karlsen 75' (pen.); Buan 80'	Report	Martynenko 68'; Hosøy 90'	Stadium: Kuventræ Stadion; Attendance: 250; Referee: Andreas Bjørklund

12 April 2025	Bjørnevatn (5)	0–11	(3) Alta	Bjørnevatn
12:00 CEST (UTC+2)		Report	Hestad 10', 24', 45', 61', 73', 75', 82'; Suhr-Stamnes 19', 51'; Lamark 68'; Åkesson 90'	Stadium: Bjørneparken; Referee: Pål Arntzen

12 April 2025	Nordstrand (4)	3–3 (a.e.t.) (2–4 p)	(3) Ull/Kisa	Oslo
13:00 CEST (UTC+2)	Shahid 80'; Kling 90'; Lopez 95'	Report; Penalties	Skille 42'; Aleksanjan 90'; Flores 105'	Stadium: Nordstrand kunstgress Referee: Batuhan Boyar

12 April 2025	Våg (4)	2–4	(2) Start	Kristiansand
13:00 CEST (UTC+2)	Eriksen 33', 58'	Report	Gono 16'; Lorentzen 68' (pen.); Schulze 72'; Benjamin 90'	Stadium: Karruss Gressbane; Referee: Javi Jean-Marc Conny Mertens

12 April 2025	Gneist (4)	0–2	(3) Lysekloster	Bergen
14:00 CEST (UTC+2)		Report	Dang 63'; Brudvik 86'	Stadium: Liland kunstgress Referee: Bjørn Tore Tvedt

12 April 2025	Askøy (4)	1–5	(2) Åsane	Follese
14:00 CEST (UTC+2)	L.M. Pedersen 35'	Report	Haugland 3' (pen.); Barmen 28'; Skålevik 82' (pen.), 87' (pen.), 90'	Stadium: Follese Tertnes Holding Arena; Referee: Ola Kellerhals

12 April 2025	Djerv 1919 (4)	2–3 (a.e.t.)	(3) Sotra	Haugesund
14:00 CEST (UTC+2)	E. V. Andersen 86'; Nygaard 103'	Report	Hjorteseth 30'; Alme 94' (pen.); Høviskeland 111'	Stadium: Djervbanen; Referee: Sander Ringøy Moen

12 April 2025	Torvastad (4)	2–0	(3) Vard Haugesund	Torvastad
14:00 CEST (UTC+2)	Grønningen 47'; Sandvik 60'	Report		Stadium: Torvastad idrettssenter Referee: Markus Lille

12 April 2025	Ørn Horten (4)	1–1 (a.e.t.) (4–3 p)	(3) Arendal	Horten
14:00 CEST (UTC+2)	Opthun 56'	Report; Penalties	Ramsland 82' (pen.)	Stadium: Lystlunden; Attendance: 424; Referee: Marius Tvede Hansen

12 April 2025	Oppsal (4)	0–1	(3) Kjelsås	Oslo
14:00 CEST (UTC+2)		Report	Eriksen 40'	Stadium: Trasop idrettspark Referee: Aland Bazaz

12 April 2025	Bærum (4)	3–3 (a.e.t.) (3–5 p)	(3) Grorud	Sandvika
14:00 CEST (UTC+2)	Bransdal 4', 53'; Markovic 91'	Report; Penalties	Hammershaug 37'; Beck 57'; Brevik 108'	Stadium: Sandvika Stadion; Referee: Herman Leiulfsrud Aass

12 April 2025	Vindbjart (4)	0–3	(3) Jerv	Vennesla
15:00 CEST (UTC+2)		Report	Mafi 29'; Endresen 66'; Hellichius 85' (pen.)	Stadium: Moseidmoen; Attendance: 453; Referee: Hussain Hamid Al-Kharasani

12 April 2025	Åssiden (4)	1–4 (a.e.t.)	(2) Mjøndalen	Drammen
15:00 CEST (UTC+2)	Langset 50'	Report	Conteh 90' (pen.), 117'; Sawaneh 92'; Bruusgaard 120'	Stadium: Åssiden stadion Attendance: 700; Referee: Sander Magdalon Bråten Johannessen

12 April 2025	Lillehammer (4)	0–2	(1) HamKam	Lillehammer
15:00 CEST (UTC+2)		Report	Mawa 54'; Mares 74' (pen.)	Stadium: Stampesletta; Referee: Haakon Arve Pedersen Bue

12 April 2025	Brumunddal (5)	1–4	(2) Raufoss	Brumunddal
15:00 CEST (UTC+2)	Haave Andersen 20'	Report	Nelson 3', 43'; Selnæs 89'; Hustad 90+1'	Stadium: Sveum Idrettspark; Attendance: 500; Referee: Johan William Grundt

12 April 2025	Elverum (4)	2–0	(4) Gjøvik-Lyn	Elverum
16:00 CEST (UTC+2)	Løvberg 21'; Nelsinho 62'	Report		Stadium: Elverum Stadion; Referee: Jonas Weiberg Sture

12 April 2025	Volda (4)	1–2	(2) Sogndal	Volda
16:00 CEST (UTC+2)	Myklebust 5'	Report	Mensah 27'; Flataker 90+4'	Stadium: Volda Stadion; Attendance: 700; Referee: Mathias Smehus Kringstad

12 April 2025	Rollon (5)	0–3	(2) Aalesund	Ålesund
16:00 CEST (UTC+2)		Report	Hammer 39'; Ngongo 62' (pen.); Lonebu 81'	Stadium: Fjordlaks Arena; Attendance: 753; Referee: Torgeir Halsen

13 April 2025	Spjelkavik (4)	0–2	(3) Træff	Ålesund
16:00 CEST (UTC+2)		Report	Lewis 58'; Eide Ohr 87'	Stadium: Spjelkavik Stadion; Referee: Daniel Refsnes

12 April 2025	NHHI (5)	1–3 (a.e.t.)	(3) Sandviken	Bergen
16:00 CEST (UTC+2)	Aarrestad 56'	Report	Garmann 90+3', 105'; Hodne 103'	Stadium: Stemmemyren kunstgress Referee: Anders Bjerk Hansen

12 April 2025	Frigg (4)	1–3	(4) Lørenskog	Oslo
16:00 CEST (UTC+2)	Ferrer 58'	Report	Løberg 19' (o.g.); Henriksen 32'; Zeneli 84'	Stadium: Tørteberg kunstgress Attendance: 125; Referee: Torstein Hofstad-Fjellet

12 April 2025	Sarpsborg FK (5)	0–4	(1) Fredrikstad	Sarpsborg
16:00 CEST (UTC+2)		Report	Skogvold 4'; Faraas 53'; Hanstad 54', 77'	Stadium: Kurland kunstgress Attendance: 1,600; Referee: Anders Bodding

12 April 2025	Junkeren (4)	2–1	(4) Harstad	Bodø
16:00 CEST (UTC+2)	Myrseth 32'; Grindberg 49'	Report	Varmedal-Haugan 75'	Stadium: Nordlandshallen; Referee: Jonas Johnsen

12 April 2025	Union Carl Berner (5)	0–3	(2) Skeid	Oslo
17:00 CEST (UTC+2)		Report	Rise 58', 64'; Sa'Ad 66'	Stadium: Grefsen Stadion; Attendance: 300; Referee: Satha Sejoohn Sritharan

13 April 2025	Brattvåg (3)	1–1 (a.e.t.) (3–5 p)	(2) Hødd	Brattvåg
14:00 CEST (UTC+2)	Rossi 9'	Report; Penalties	Skjold 79'	Stadium: Brattvåg gras Attendance: 489; Referee: Jan Morten Tennøy
	Penalties
	Solskjær (penalty scored); Vinje (penalty scored); Myers (penalty missed); Stølan (penalty scored)		(penalty scored) Lervik; (penalty scored) Blikstad; (penalty scored) Johansen; (penalty scored) Urnes; (penalty scored) Kallevåg

13 April 2025	Flint (4)	3–2	(2) Odd	Tolvsrød
14:00 CEST (UTC+2)	Srour 24'; Bruun 76'; Ramstad 84'	Report	Aas 56'; Harðarson 89'	Stadium: Flint Esso Arena; Attendance: 200; Referee: Pavel Breivik

13 April 2025	Bjørkelangen (4)	1–6	(3) Strømmen	Bjørkelangen
15:00 CEST (UTC+2)	Kolstad 36'	Report	Lillo 22'; Kristengård 33'; Hristov 56'; Åsvestad 72'; Solli 86'; Balatoni 90+2'	Stadium: Bjørkelangen kunstgress Referee: Jørgen Haugen

13 April 2025	Skjervøy (4)	2–1	(4) Fløya	Skjervøy
16:00 CEST (UTC+2)	Johannessen 14'; Skallebø 75'	Report	Kristian Olsen 90'	Stadium: Skjervøy kunstgress Attendance: 112; Referee: Magnus Aaslund

13 April 2025	Ulfstind (4)	0–3	(3) Tromsdalen	Tromsø
16:00 CEST (UTC+2)		Report	Sandbukt 35'; Nilsen-Modebe 73', 74'	Stadium: TUIL Arena; Referee: Egil Bertheussen

13 April 2025	Melbo (5)	0–1	(4) Sortland	Melbu
16:00 CEST (UTC+2)		Report	Kleczka 90' (o.g.)	Stadium: Havfisk Stadion; Referee: Michael Wikestad Pedersen

13 April 2025	Hamna (5)	0–10	(1) Tromsø	Tromsø
16:00 CEST (UTC+2)		Report	Paintsil 10'; Braut 24', 57', 59', 75', 77'; Christensen 26', 39'; Camões 54'; Kleiva 90+1'	Stadium: Fløya Arena; Attendance: 818; Referee: Øyvind Jøstensen

13 April 2025	Mosjøen (5)	0–4	(3) Rana	Mosjøen
16:00 CEST (UTC+2)		Report	Beyene 18'; G. Andersen 33'; Kristiansen Råde 50'; Helle Hildre 87'	Stadium: Kippermoen; Referee: Even Andreas Richter Eliassen

13 April 2025	Rindal (5)	1–11	(1) Rosenborg	Storås
16:00 CEST (UTC+2)	Hagen Eide 66'	Report	Þorvaldsson 30'; Holm 32', 46', 52', 58', 62', 82', 84'; Sæter 45', 88'; Reitan-Sunde 77'	Stadium: Heggøya kunstgras Attendance: 2,000; Referee: Håkon Rinaldo

13 April 2025	Sverresborg (5)	2–4	(2) Ranheim	Trondheim
16:00 CEST (UTC+2)	Saga 70'; Elmgren 88'	Report	Tørset Johnsen 18'; Skåren 21' (o.g.); Holden 78'; Mogensen 82'	Stadium: Havsteinbanen; Referee: Per Oscar Grov Heiberg

13 April 2025	Kvik (Trondheim) (4)	0–1	(3) Stjørdals-Blink	Trondheim
16:00 CEST (UTC+2)		Report	Solheim 26'	Stadium: Rosenborgbanen; Referee: Marit Buhaug Folstad

13 April 2025	Verdal (5)	0–8	(3) Levanger	Verdalsøra
16:00 CEST (UTC+2)		Report	Sundnes 18'; Mattingsdal 21', 53'; Sondre Aas 45', 68'; Høiseth 60', 63'; Teigen 75'	Stadium: Verdalskalk Arena; Attendance: 230; Referee: Anders Husøy

13 April 2025	Trygg/Lade (4)	0–1	(3) Strindheim	Trondheim
16:00 CEST (UTC+2)		Report	Halgunset 19' (pen.)	Stadium: OBOS kunstgressbane Referee: Preben Øien

13 April 2025	Byåsen (4)	3–5 (a.e.t.)	(4) Nardo	Trondheim
16:00 CEST (UTC+2)	Nordli 49'; Flaathe-Simonsen 59'; Killi Olsen 94'	Report	Austberg 22'; Nordland 67'; Kvitnes 98'; Sandvik 116'; Rotlid 119'	Stadium: Byåsen Arena; Attendance: 206; Referee: Oliver Skaret Barsøe

13 April 2025	Melhus (4)	1–5	(1) Kristiansund	Melhus
16:00 CEST (UTC+2)	Thorsen 78'	Report	Jeličić 8'; Alte 9'; Alvheim 14'; Alemseged 54'; Ramlo 56' (o.g.)	Stadium: Gruva; Attendance: 203; Referee: Robert Eggen

13 April 2025	Elnesvågen (5)	0–7	(1) Molde	Elnesvågen
16:00 CEST (UTC+2)		Report	Abdullai 5', 9'; Granaas 21'; Daga 22'; Haugen 51'; Berisha 66', 90+1'	Stadium: Elnesvågen Stadion; Attendance: 1,293; Referee: Bendik Haarberg

13 April 2025	Fjøra (4)	1–3	(4) Bjarg	Sogndalsfjøra
16:00 CEST (UTC+2)	Niyomwungere 51'	Report	Ahlander 38'; Aga 53'; Dahl 90'	Stadium: Fosshaugane Campus; Referee: Jonas Sande Mossestad

13 April 2025	Varegg (5)	0–6	(1) Brann	Bergen
16:00 CEST (UTC+2)		Report	Sande 6'; Hansen 12', 63' (pen.); Finne 35'; T. B. Pedersen 69'; Holten 79'	Stadium: Stemmemyren kunstgress Attendance: 1,181; Referee: Sivert Øksnes Amland

13 April 2025	Nord (5)	0–11	(1) Haugesund	Karmøy
16:00 CEST (UTC+2)		Report	Nyhammer 5', 55', 81'; Østrått 15' (o.g.); Eskesen 20', 41'; Samuelsen 23'; Seone 26', 75'; Innvær 68'; Eide 82'	Stadium: Bauge Auto Arena; Attendance: 1,013; Referee: Sondre Brudvik

13 April 2025	Vidar (4)	2–0	(3) Sandnes Ulf	Stavanger
16:00 CEST (UTC+2)	Nilsen Pereira 31'; Dirdal 74'	Report		Stadium: Lassa Idrettspark; Attendance: 115; Referee: Karoline Marie Jensen

13 April 2025	Eiger (5)	1–7	(2) Egersund	Egersund
16:00 CEST (UTC+2)	M. Andersen 20'	Report	Sauer 23', 76'; M. Andersen 37' (o.g.); Elvevold 53'; Job 57'; Halgunset 84'; Kapskarmo 86'	Stadium: Bøgh Hafsø banen Referee: Jørgen Haga

13 April 2025	Hana (5)	0–6	(1) Viking	Sandnes
16:00 CEST (UTC+2)		Report	Botnen 20'; Mikaelsson 29', 82' (pen.); Cappis 36'; Austbø 85'; Fuglestad 89'	Stadium: Hanabanen; Attendance: 1,500; Referee: Amir Ajjour

13 April 2025	Varhaug (5)	0–4	(1) Bryne	Varhaug
16:00 CEST (UTC+2)		Report	H. Å. Larsen 7', 18', 47'; Sødal 64'	Stadium: Varhaug Kunstgress; Referee: Aleksander Skjold Vermundsen

13 April 2025	Brodd (4)	1–3	(3) Fløy	Storhaug
16:00 CEST (UTC+2)	Sveingard 62'	Report	Byklum 23', 56', 90'	Stadium: Midjord idrettspark Referee: Mischa Huru Kellerhals

13 April 2025	Notodden (3)	0–3	(2) Stabæk	Notodden
16:00 CEST (UTC+2)		Report	Næss 10'; Diabaté 72', 90+1'	Stadium: Idrettsparken; Attendance: 523; Referee: Håvard Bjerkelund

13 April 2025	Konnerud (5)	0–5	(1) Strømsgodset	Drammen
16:00 CEST (UTC+2)		Report	Ardraa 5'; Farji 20', 28'; Melkersen 31'; Möller 89'	Stadium: Konnerud Stadion; Referee: Magnus Nicolai Koløy

13 April 2025	Hønefoss (3)	0–1	(3) Pors	Hønefoss
16:00 CEST (UTC+2)		Report	Meen 86'	Stadium: Aka Arena; Attendance: 527; Referee: Lars Bratteli Jacobsen

13 April 2025	Teie (5)	0–5	(1) Sandefjord	Teie
16:00 CEST (UTC+2)		Report	Gjone 20', 35'; Mathisen 62', 73'; Melchior 76'	Stadium: Teie idrettspark Referee: Eirik Wisted-Thu

13 April 2025	Fram (4)	4–1	(3) Eik Tønsberg	Larvik
16:00 CEST (UTC+2)	Lunde 2'; Lysebo Johansen 84'; U. Pedersen 90'; Ahmed 90' (pen.)	Report	Stokke 62'	Stadium: Framparken; Attendance: 564; Referee: Himmet Boyar

13 April 2025	Ridabu (5)	0–12	(2) Kongsvinger	Ridabu
16:00 CEST (UTC+2)		Report	Haren 13', 44', 59' (pen.), 90+1'; Holtan 18', 63'; Grundt 31', 60', 65', 67'; Vinjor 35'; Nilsson 56'	Stadium: Black River Park; Attendance: 312; Referee: Markus Rotvold Hammarstrøm

13 April 2025	Skjetten (4)	0–5	(2) Lillestrøm	Skjetten
16:00 CEST (UTC+2)		Report	Diop 39', 50', 56'; Karlsbakk 64'; Vá 78'	Stadium: Skjetten Stadion; Attendance: 1,500; Referee: Stian Røvig Sletner

13 April 2025	Grei (4)	1–5	(1) KFUM	Oslo
16:00 CEST (UTC+2)	Barrow 23'	Report	Nuñez 25', 69', 77'; Hickson 31'; Semmen 74'	Stadium: Greibanen; Referee: Mohammad Hafezi

13 April 2025	Ullern (4)	2–5	(3) Follo	Oslo
16:00 CEST (UTC+2)	Victorio 45'; Knezevic 54'	Report	Ottesen 15'; H. Hagen 70'; Helling 80'; Hennig 90'	Stadium: Ullernbanen; Referee: Emilie Rodahl Torkelsen

13 April 2025	Ready (4)	3–3 (a.e.t.) (4–3 p)	(3) Asker	Oslo
16:00 CEST (UTC+2)	Skjelle 40'; Ebbesen 61', 94'	Report; Penalties	Syvertsen 84'; Sesay 87' (pen.); Y. Larsen 110'	Stadium: Gressbanen; Referee: Andreas Flückiger

13 April 2025	Gamle Oslo (4)	1–1 (a.e.t.) (3–1 p)	(1) Vålerenga	Oslo
16:00 CEST (UTC+2)	Wielens 72'	Report; Penalties	El. Hagen 43' (pen.)	Stadium: Vallhall Arena; Attendance: 1,350; Referee: Herman Holthe
	Penalties
	Tavakoli (penalty scored); Furu (penalty scored); Telle (penalty missed); Sowe (penalty scored)		(penalty missed) El. Hagen; (penalty missed) Sørensen; (penalty scored) Brajanac; (penalty missed) Bjørdal

13 April 2025	Råde (5)	1–2	(2) Lyn	Råde
16:00 CEST (UTC+2)	Hasanagic 16'	Report	Niang 24'; Sylla 64'	Stadium: Råde idrettspark Referee: Eivind Bodding

13 April 2025	Sprint-Jeløy (5)	0–4	(1) Sarpsborg 08	Moss
16:00 CEST (UTC+2)		Report	Gudjohnsen 9'; Sanyang 28', 34', 64'	Stadium: Bellevue; Attendance: 511; Referee: Abdulhadi Al-Fahad

13 April 2025	Kvik Halden (4)	1–3	(2) Moss	Halden
17:00 CEST (UTC+2)	Næsheim 19'	Report	Hegland 1', 28'; Benarfa 73'	Stadium: Halden Stadion; Attendance: 403; Referee: Arion Shaqiri

13 April 2025	Skedsmo (4)	0–5	(3) Eidsvold Turn	Skedsmokorset
18:00 CEST (UTC+2)		Report	Jorsett-Udnæs 6'; Kaba 31'; Frøhaug Johnsen 34'; Bandeh 46'; Solberg 73'	Stadium: Skedsmo Stadion; Referee: Hakan Catalgøl

== Second round ==
The pair-ups for the second round were announced on 14 April 2025.

Number of teams per tier entering this round
Eliteserien (1)	1. divisjon (2)	2. divisjon (3)	3. divisjon (4)	4. divisjon (5)	5. divisjon (6)	Total
15 / 16	15 / 16	19 / 27	15 / 58	0 / 139	0 / 4	64 / 260

23 April 2025	Skjervøy (4)	0–1	(1) Tromsø	Skjervøy
18:00 CEST (UTC+2)		Report	F. Christensen 40'	Stadium: Skjervøy kunstgress Attendance: 292; Referee: Egil Bertheussen

24 April 2025	Levanger (3)	1–2	(3) Rana	Levanger
17:00 CEST (UTC+2)	Høiseth 83'	Report	Solhaug 86'; Råde 90'	Stadium: TOBB Arena Levanger; Attendance: 353; Referee: Robert Eggen

24 April 2025	Grorud (3)	3–1	(2) Hødd	Oslo
17:30 CEST (UTC+2)	Pozo 11'; Dubois 14'; Hammershaug 34'	Report	Brandal 15'	Stadium: Grorud matchbane Attendance: 325; Referee: Mohammad Hafezi

24 April 2025	Junkeren (4)	1–5	(1) Bodø/Glimt	Bodø
18:00 CEST (UTC+2)	Chooly 73'	Report	Bro Hansen 3', 61', 76'; Berg 38'; Høgh 82' (pen.)	Stadium: Aspmyra Stadion; Referee: Even Andreas Richter Eliassen

24 April 2025	Alta (3)	3–0	(2) Skeid	Alta
18:00 CEST (UTC+2)	Hestad 46'; Opgård 82'; Reginiussen 90+1'	Report		Stadium: SmartDok Arena; Referee: Arion Shaqiri

24 April 2025	Sortland (4)	0–5	(3) Tromsdalen	Sortland
18:00 CEST (UTC+2)		Report	Sandbukt 2'; Seferi 65'; Nilsen-Modebe 69', 72'; Rekdal 90'	Stadium: Blåbyhallen; Attendance: 340; Referee: Torjus Johansen Kaspersen

24 April 2025	Nardo (4)	1–4	(1) Kristiansund	Trondheim
18:00 CEST (UTC+2)	Krokbø 83'	Report	Alvheim 10'; Guessand 16'; Isah 30'; Ndour 81'	Stadium: Phonereparatøren Arena; Attendance: 276; Referee: Per Oscar Grov Heiberg

24 April 2025	Strindheim (3)	0–3	(1) Rosenborg	Trondheim
18:00 CEST (UTC+2)		Report	Sæter 4', 13' (pen.); Zeidan 70'	Stadium: Leangen Bolig Arena; Referee: Mathias Støfringshaug

24 April 2025	Stjørdals-Blink (3)	1–2	(2) Ranheim	Stjørdalshalsen
18:00 CEST (UTC+2)	Solheim 77'	Report	Pereira 22'; Samuelsen 50'	Stadium: TMT Stadion Sandskogan; Attendance: 302; Referee: Oliver Skaret Barsøe

24 April 2025	Træff (3)	1–1 (a.e.t.) (11–12 p)	(1) Molde	Molde
18:00 CEST (UTC+2)	Lewis 90+8'	Report; Penalties	Granaas 82'	Stadium: Reknesbanen; Referee: Mathias Smehus Kringstad
	Penalties
	Lewis (penalty scored); Kjørsvik (penalty scored); Heggstad (penalty scored); Amdam (penalty scored); Forren (penalty scored); Myklebust (penalty scored); Ohr (penalty scored); Gravdehaug (penalty scored); Bøe (penalty scored); Baskett (penalty scored); Flønes (penalty scored); Lewis (penalty missed)		(penalty scored) Stenevik; (penalty scored) Enggård; (penalty scored) Linnes; (penalty scored) Eikrem; (penalty scored) Haugen; (penalty scored) Breivik; (penalty scored) Haugan; (penalty scored) Karlstrøm; (penalty scored) Dæhli; (penalty scored) Amundsen; (penalty scored) Granaas; (penalty scored) Stenevik

24 April 2025	Os (4)	5–4 (a.e.t.)	(3) Lysekloster	Os
18:00 CEST (UTC+2)	Rysjedal 16'; Sperrevik 64'; Karlsen 82'; Moberg 101'; Bergslid 117' (o.g.)	Report	Marthinussen 21'; Tufta 40'; Dang 71'; Bolsø 95'	Stadium: Kuventræ Stadion; Attendance: 780; Referee: Haakon Arve Pedersen Bue

24 April 2025	Sandviken (3)	0–4	(2) Sogndal	Bergen
18:00 CEST (UTC+2)		Report	Skaanes 57'; Granheim 78'; Hintsa 79', 90+2'	Stadium: Stemmemyren; Referee: Sondre Brudvik

24 April 2025	Bjarg (4)	0–2	(1) Brann	Bergen
18:00 CEST (UTC+2)		Report	M. Hansen 2'; Finne 12'	Stadium: Stavollen Kunstgress; Referee: Jan Morten Tennøy

24 April 2025	Sotra (3)	0–2	(2) Åsane	Sotra
18:00 CEST (UTC+2)		Report	Eikrem 33'; Myklebust 90+5'	Stadium: Straume Idrettspark; Attendance: 153; Referee: Steinar Hauge

24 April 2025	Torvastad (4)	1–2	(1) Bryne	Torvastad
18:00 CEST (UTC+2)	Skjelde 37'	Report	Strunck 18'; Bojadzic 47'	Stadium: Torvastad idrettssenter Referee: Freek Arjen van Herk

24 April 2025	Vidar (4)	1–2	(1) Haugesund	Stavanger
18:00 CEST (UTC+2)	Hæstad 90'	Report	Samuelsen 72'; Seone 81'	Stadium: Lassa Idrettspark; Referee: Mischa Huru Kellerhals

24 April 2025	Fløy (3)	0–3	(1) Viking	Flekkerøy
18:00 CEST (UTC+2)		Report	P. Christiansen 71'; J. S. Hansen 79'; Svendsen 90'	Stadium: Cemo Arena; Attendance: 1,200; Referee: Svein Tore Sinnes

24 April 2025	Jerv (3)	0–1	(2) Egersund	Grimstad
18:00 CEST (UTC+2)		Report	Kapskarmo 18'	Stadium: Levermyr Stadion; Attendance: 931; Referee: Marius Lien

24 April 2025	Pors (3)	3–2 (a.e.t.)	(2) Start	Porsgrunn
18:00 CEST (UTC+2)	Mladenovic 89', 90+2'; Garstad 108'	Report	Ujkani 62'; Nilsen 90'	Stadium: Pors Stadion; Attendance: 898; Referee: Herman Leiulfsrud Aass

24 April 2025	Fram (4)	0–4	(2) Stabæk	Larvik
18:00 CEST (UTC+2)		Report	Kostadinov 37'; Riise 51'; Vinge 62'; Olderheim 72'	Stadium: Framparken; Attendance: 544; Referee: Jørgen Haga

24 April 2025	Flint (4)	0–5	(1) Fredrikstad	Tolvsrød
18:00 CEST (UTC+2)		Report	Fall 2'; Skaret 28'; Hanstad 31'; Shein 81'; Faraas 85'	Stadium: Flint Esso Arena; Attendance: 1,050; Referee: Harald Vollstad Sletner

24 April 2025	Ørn Horten (4)	0–2	(1) Sandefjord	Horten
18:00 CEST (UTC+2)		Report	Mettler 48'; Jemal 90+3'	Stadium: Lystlunden; Attendance: 564; Referee: Ole-Alexander Ekeli Valen

24 April 2025	Elverum (4)	2–7	(2) Kongsvinger	Elverum
18:00 CEST (UTC+2)	Høiby 64'; Løvberg 90'	Report	Grundt 22', 70'; Øverby 25'; Nilsson 33'; Holtan 65', 89'; Wilhelmsen 72'	Stadium: Elverum Stadion; Referee: Ali al Hatam

24 April 2025	Ull/Kisa (3)	2–3	(2) Aalesund	Jessheim
18:00 CEST (UTC+2)	Flores 36'; Skille 44' (pen.)	Report	Seehusen 9'; Braga 27'; Andresen 40'	Stadium: Jessheim Stadion; Attendance: 606; Referee: Johan William Grundt

24 April 2025	Lørenskog (4)	0–1	(1) HamKam	Lillestrøm
18:00 CEST (UTC+2)		Report	Jónsson 25'	Stadium: LSK-Hallen; Attendance: 320; Referee: Ajdin Medic

24 April 2025	Strømmen (3)	2–1	(2) Raufoss	Strømmen
18:00 CEST (UTC+2)	Kristengård 14'; Rindal 48'	Report	Somesi 72'	Stadium: Strømmen Stadion; Attendance: 283; Referee: Abdulhadi Al-Fahad

24 April 2025	Follo (3)	2–3	(2) Moss	Ski
18:00 CEST (UTC+2)	Tøgersen 16'; Helling 62'	Report	Krohg 32'; Memedov 48'; Jakobsen 50' (pen.)	Stadium: Ski Stadion; Attendance: 305; Referee: Herman Holthe

24 April 2025	Gamle Oslo (4)	1–6	(1) Sarpsborg 08	Oslo
18:00 CEST (UTC+2)	Jammeh 16'	Report	Karlsbakk 6', 46'; Sanyang 7', 46', 68'; Reinhardsen 35'; Gudjohnsen 49'	Stadium: Vallhall Arena; Referee: Jørgen Haugen

24 April 2025	Ready (4)	0–3	(1) KFUM	Oslo
18:00 CEST (UTC+2)		Report	Rasch 42' (pen.); Semmen 70'; Njie 90+3' (pen.)	Stadium: Gressbanen; Referee: Stian Røvig Sletner

24 April 2025	Kjelsås (3)	0–3	(2) Lyn	Oslo
18:00 CEST (UTC+2)		Report	Ingebrigtsen 9'; Hellum 51'; Niang 83'	Stadium: Grefsen Stadion; Attendance: 896; Referee: Anders Bodding

24 April 2025	Eidsvold Turn (3)	0–2	(2) Lillestrøm	Eidsvold
18:30 CEST (UTC+2)		Report	Adedeji 34'; Vá 90+5'	Stadium: Myhrer Stadion; Attendance: 1,020; Referee: Magnus Nicolai Koløy

24 April 2025	Mjøndalen (2)	1–1 (a.e.t.) (4–3 p)	(1) Strømsgodset	Mjøndalen
19:20 CEST (UTC+2)	Conteh 57'	Report; Penalties	Valsvik 70'	Stadium: Consto Arena; Attendance: 3,332; Referee: Eivind Bodding
	Penalties
	Conteh (penalty scored); Skaar Eriksen (penalty scored); Singh (penalty scored); Sawaneh (penalty scored)		(penalty scored) Stengel; (penalty missed) Krasniqi; (penalty scored) Tómasson; (penalty scored) Mehnert; (penalty missed) Westerlund

== Third round ==
The pair-ups for the third round were announced on 24 April 2025.

Number of teams per tier entering this round
Eliteserien (1)	1. divisjon (2)	2. divisjon (3)	3. divisjon (4)	4. divisjon (5)	5. divisjon (6)	Total
14 / 16	11 / 16	6 / 27	1 / 58	0 / 139	0 / 4	32 / 260

7 May 2025	Grorud (3)	2–3 (a.e.t.)	(2) Lillestrøm	Oslo
18:00 CEST (UTC+2)	Fajfric 39'; Asp 118'	Report	Vá 53'; Kitolano 98'; Karlsbakk 102'	Stadium: Grorud matchbane Attendance: 1,397; Referee: Harald Vollstad Sletner

7 May 2025	Os (4)	1–4	(2) Åsane	Os
18:00 CEST (UTC+2)	Rysjedal 62'	Report	Haugland 19'; Barmen 30', 52'; Fredriksen 84'	Stadium: Kuventræ Stadion; Attendance: 1,008; Referee: Jan Morten Tennøy

7 May 2025	Strømmen (3)	1–3	(2) Mjøndalen	Strømmen
18:00 CEST (UTC+2)	Midtgarden 33' (o.g.)	Report	Conteh 45+1', 73', 90+5'	Stadium: Strømmen Stadion; Attendance: 486; Referee: Mischa Kellerhals

7 May 2025	Bryne (1)	2–1 (a.e.t.)	(1) Brann	Bryne
18:00 CEST (UTC+2)	Steffensen 45+1'; Kryger 118'	Report	Finne 84'	Stadium: Bryne Stadion; Attendance: 2,252; Referee: Sigurd Kringstad

7 May 2025	Alta (3)	0–4	(1) Kristiansund	Alta
18:00 CEST (UTC+2)		Report	Alemseged 17'; Kilen 29', 63'; Isah 57'	Stadium: SmartDok Arena; Attendance: 742; Referee: Jørgen Haugen

7 May 2025	Sarpsborg 08 (1)	3–1	(1) Sandefjord	Sarpsborg
18:00 CEST (UTC+2)	Guðjohnsen 4', 49'; Sanyang 13'	Report	Egeli 89'	Stadium: Sarpsborg Stadion; Attendance: 1,393; Referee: Sivert Amland

7 May 2025	Rana (3)	0–4	(1) Molde	Mo i Rana
18:00 CEST (UTC+2)		Report	Hestad 25'; Abdullai 47', 53'; Eikrem 87'	Stadium: Sagbakken Stadion; Attendance: 2,111; Referee: Mathias Støfringshaug

7 May 2025	Tromsdalen (3)	0–5	(1) Rosenborg	Tromsø
18:00 CEST (UTC+2)		Report	Yttergård Jenssen 2'; Holm 12', 30', 37'; Þorvaldsson 61'	Stadium: TUIL Arena; Attendance: 1,398; Referee: Johan William Grundt

7 May 2025	Stabæk (2)	2–1	(1) Haugesund	Bærum
18:00 CEST (UTC+2)	Isaksen 9'; Kostadinov 74'	Report	Innvær 71'	Stadium: Nadderud Stadion; Attendance: 711; Referee: Mohammad Usman Aslam

7 May 2025	Pors (3)	1–3	(1) Fredrikstad	Porsgrunn
18:00 CEST (UTC+2)	Henriksrud 50'	Report	Holten 22', 65' (pen.); Eid 77'	Stadium: Pors Stadion; Attendance: 1,905; Referee: Magnus Nicolai Koløy

7 May 2025	Lyn (2)	0–2	(1) HamKam	Oslo
18:00 CEST (UTC+2)		Report	Sørås 19'; Lien 70'	Stadium: Bislett Stadium; Attendance: 1,100; Referee: Daniel Higraff

7 May 2025	Sogndal (2)	3–3 (a.e.t.) (3–4 p)	(2) Kongsvinger	Sogndalsfjøra
19:00 CEST (UTC+2)	Hintsa 2'; Flataker 59' (pen.); Pedersen 62'	Report; Penalties	Gjerstrøm 40'; Haren 43'; Grundt 54'	Stadium: Fosshaugane Campus; Attendance: 636; Referee: Steinar Hauge
	Penalties
	Hintsa (penalty scored); Vapne (penalty scored); Nundal (penalty scored); Borgþórsson (penalty missed); Sjølstad (penalty missed)		(penalty scored) Grundt; (penalty scored) Dybevik; (penalty scored) Nilsson; (penalty scored) Holmé

7 May 2025	Ranheim (2)	2–2 (a.e.t.) (0–3 p)	(2) Egersund	Trondheim
19:00 CEST (UTC+2)		Report; Penalties		Stadium: EXTRA Arena; Attendance: 801; Referee: Eivind Bodding
	Penalties
	Johnsen (penalty missed); Kolstad (penalty missed); Brattbakk (penalty missed)		(penalty scored) Kapskarmo; (penalty missed) Bergersen; (penalty scored) Vatne; (penalty scored) Pichkah

7 May 2025	Moss (2)	0–1	(1) Viking	Moss
19:05 CEST (UTC+2)		Report	Mikaelsson 90+3'	Stadium: Melløs Stadion; Attendance: 1,093; Referee: Rohit Saggi

8 May 2025	Tromsø (1)	0–1	(1) KFUM	Tromsø
18:00 CEST (UTC+2)		Report	Hjorth 23'	Stadium: Romssa Arena; Attendance: 1,306; Referee: Kristoffer Hagenes

12 May 2025	Aalesund (2)	1–0	(1) Bodø/Glimt	Ålesund
19:00 CEST (UTC+2)	Andresen 52'	Report		Stadium: Color Line Stadion; Attendance: 3,008; Referee: Marius Lien

== Fourth round ==
The pair-ups for the fourth round were announced on 7 May 2025.

Number of teams per tier entering this round
Eliteserien (1)	1. divisjon (2)	2. divisjon (3)	3. divisjon (4)	4. divisjon (5)	5. divisjon (6)	Total
9 / 16	7 / 16	0 / 27	0 / 58	0 / 139	0 / 4	16 / 260

20 May 2025	Egersund (2)	1–3	(1) Sarpsborg 08	Egersund
18:00 CEST (UTC+2)	Sauer 3'	Report	Guðjohnsen 40'; Halvorsen 42'; Karlsbakk 76' (pen.)	Stadium: B&G Parken; Attendance: 942; Referee: Kristoffer Hagenes

20 May 2025	Åsane (2)	0–7	(1) Viking	Bergen
18:00 CEST (UTC+2)		Report	Christiansen 11', 63'; Vevatne 19'; Svendsen 30'; Kvia-Egeskog 49'; Fuglestad 64'; Mikaelsson 83'	Stadium: Åsane Arena; Attendance: 1,095; Referee: Stian Røvig Sletner

20 May 2025	Bryne (1)	0–2	(1) KFUM	Bryne
18:00 CEST (UTC+2)		Report	Okeke 40'; Gyedu 78'	Stadium: Bryne Stadion; Attendance: 1,422; Referee: Rohit Saggi

20 May 2025	Aalesund (2)	2–2 (a.e.t.) (6–5 p)	(1) HamKam	Ålesund
18:00 CEST (UTC+2)	Ngongo 34'; Haram 65'	Report; Penalties	Mares 45' (pen.); Osnes-Ringen 69'	Stadium: Color Line Stadion; Attendance: 1,923; Referee: Marius Hansen Grøtta
	Penalties
	(penalty missed) Hammer; (penalty missed) Heiselberg; (penalty scored) Melland; (penalty scored) Andresen; (penalty scored) Braga; (penalty scored) Nessø; (penalty scored) Lonebu; (penalty scored) Jóhannsson		(penalty scored) Mares; (penalty missed) Kirkevold; (penalty scored) Gonstad; (penalty missed) Bjarnason; (penalty scored) Simenstad; (penalty scored) Jónsson; (penalty scored) Roaldsøy; (penalty missed) Sørås

20 May 2025	Stabæk (2)	4–3	(2) Mjøndalen	Bærum
18:00 CEST (UTC+2)	Øy 11' (o.g.); Dalby 40'; Næss 54'; Spiten-Nysæter 69'	Report	Sawaneh 17'; Conteh 66'; Bruusgaard 72'	Stadium: Nadderud Stadion; Attendance: 961; Referee: Mathias Støfringshaug

20 May 2025	Kongsvinger (2)	2–3 (a.e.t.)	(1) Rosenborg	Kongsvinger
20:00 CEST (UTC+2)	Taylor 32'; Williams 67'	Report	Þorvaldsson 40'; Broholm 83'; Fossum 113'	Stadium: Gjemselund Stadion; Attendance: 3,049; Referee: Christian Moen

21 May 2025	Molde (1)	3–4 (a.e.t.)	(1) Kristiansund	Molde
19:00 CEST (UTC+2)	Wolff Eikrem 19'; Berisha 32'; Kabini 120+3'	Report	Kilen 70', 90+1', 93'; Ndour 116'	Stadium: Aker Stadion; Attendance: 2,216; Referee: Daniel Higraff

21 May 2025	Lillestrøm (2)	1–1 (a.e.t.) (3–1 p)	(1) Fredrikstad	Lillestrøm
19:00 CEST (UTC+2)	Lehne Olsen 13'	Report; Penalties	Stray Molde 50'	Stadium: Åråsen Stadion; Attendance: 4,077; Referee: Ola Hobber Nilsen
	Penalties
	Karlsbakk (penalty scored); Krygård (penalty scored); Gabrielsen (penalty scored); Kitolano (penalty missed)		(penalty missed) Holten; (penalty scored) Øhlenschlæger; (penalty missed) Eid; (penalty missed) Sørløkk

== Quarter-finals ==
The pair-ups for the quarter-finals were announced on 22 May 2025.

Number of teams per tier entering this round
Eliteserien (1)	1. divisjon (2)	2. divisjon (3)	3. divisjon (4)	4. divisjon (5)	5. divisjon (6)	Total
5 / 16	3 / 16	0 / 27	0 / 58	0 / 139	0 / 4	8 / 260

25 June 2025	Stabæk (2)	2–2 (a.e.t.) (1–4 p)	(1) Kristiansund	Bærum
18:00 CEST (UTC+2)	Dahlby 11'; Spiten-Nysæter 62'	Report; Penalties	Ødegård 27'; Tufekcic 63'	Stadium: Nadderud Stadion; Attendance: 2,358; Referee: Christian Moen
	Penalties
	Næss (penalty missed); Geelmuyden (penalty scored); Onsrud (penalty missed)		(penalty scored) Ndour; (penalty scored) Corlu; (penalty scored) Isah; (penalty scored) Alemseged

25 June 2025	Rosenborg (1)	2–2 (a.e.t.) (2–4 p)	(1) Sarpsborg 08	Trondheim
18:00 CEST (UTC+2)	Islamović 90+5', 101'	Report; Penalties	Ørjasæter 39'; Berget 105'	Stadium: Lerkendal Stadion; Attendance: 8,169; Referee: Ola Hobber Nilsen
	Penalties
	Sæter (penalty missed); Islamović (penalty missed); Selnæs (penalty scored); Fossum (penalty scored)		(penalty scored) Sandberg; (penalty scored) Guðjohnsen; (penalty scored) Berget; (penalty scored) Ndiaye

25 June 2025	Lillestrøm (2)	2–0	(1) KFUM	Lillestrøm
18:00 CEST (UTC+2)	Karlsbakk 51'; Diop 84'	Report		Stadium: Åråsen Stadion; Attendance: 6,152; Referee: Marius Hansen Grøtta

25 June 2025	Aalesund (2)	0–1	(1) Viking	Ålesund
18:00 CEST (UTC+2)		Report	Christiansen 82'	Stadium: Color Line Stadion; Attendance: 3,796; Referee: Mohammad Usman Aslam

== Semi-finals ==
The pair-ups for the semi-finals were announced on 22 May 2025.

Number of teams per tier entering this round
Eliteserien (1)	1. divisjon (2)	2. divisjon (3)	3. divisjon (4)	4. divisjon (5)	Total
3 / 16	1 / 16	0 / 28	0 / 84	0 / 272	4 / 416

9 July 2025	Lillestrøm (2)	2–0	(1) Kristiansund	Lillestrøm
18:00 CEST (UTC+2)	Karlsbakk 33'; Lehne Olsen 47'	Report		Stadium: Åråsen Stadion; Attendance: 8,220; Referee: Rohit Saggi

9 July 2025	Sarpsborg 08 (1)	1–0	(1) Viking	Sarpsborg
20:00 CEST (UTC+2)	Berget 50'	Report		Stadium: Sarpsborg Stadion; Attendance: 7,014; Referee: Kristoffer Hagenes

== Final ==
The final was played on 6 December 2025.

6 December 2025
16:00 CET (UTC+1)

Lillestrøm	3–1	Sarpsborg 08
Lehne Olsen 69'; Karlsbakk 73'; Garnås 79'	Report	Berget 30'

Ullevaal Stadion, Oslo
Attendance: 23,202
Referee: Sivert Øksnes Amland (Fana)

== Top scorers ==
Rank	Player	Club	Goals
1	(Norway) Noah Holm	Rosenborg	10
2	(Norway) Jesper Grundt	Kongsvinger	9
3	(Sierra Leone) Alie Conteh	Mjøndalen	8
3	(Norway) Tobias Hestad	Alta	8
5	(Denmark) Mikkel Bro Hansen	Bodø/Glimt	6
5	(Iceland) Sveinn Aron Guðjohnsen	Sarpsborg 08	6
5	(Norway) Markus Karlsbakk	Lillestrøm	6
5	(The Gambia) Alagie Sanyang	Sarpsborg 08	6
9	(Norway) Daniel Braut	Tromsø	5
9	(Norway) Sander Kilen	Kristiansund	5
