= 2025 IK Start season =

Start
2025 season
- Chairman: Børre Fredriksen
- Head coach: Azar Karadas
- Stadium: Sparebanken Sør Arena
- 1. divisjon: 2nd (promoted)
- 2025 Norwegian Cup: Second round
- 2025–26 Norwegian Cup: Second round
- Top goalscorer: League: Håkon Lorentzen (13); All: Håkon Lorentzen (14)
Home colours	Away colours

The 2025 season was the 120th in the history of IK Start and their fifth consecutive season in the second tier of Norwegian football. The club competed in the Norwegian First Division and the Norwegian Football Cup.

== Transfers ==
=== In ===
Pos.	Player	Transferred from	Fee	Date	Source
DF	(Tunisia) Omar Jebali	(Denmark) Vendsyssel FF	Free	16 January 2025	
MF	(Cameroon) Stève Mvoué	(France) Paris 13 Atletico	Free	5 February 2025	
GK	(Norway) Storm Strand-Kolbjørnsen	(Norway) Vålerenga	Undisclosed	17 February 2025	
FW	(Nigeria) Terry Benjamin		Undisclosed	8 March 2025	

=== Out ===
Pos.	Player	Transferred to	Fee	Date	Source
FW	(Nigeria) Mustapha Isah	(Denmark) Randers FC	Loan return	31 December 2024	
FW	(Norway) Sander Svela	(Norway) Vindbjart	Free	17 February 2025	
FW	(Sweden) Salim Nkubiri		Contract terminated	21 March 2025	

== Friendlies ==
=== Pre-season ===
5 February 2025 Friendly	Start (Norway)	5–1	(Norway) Flekkerøy IL
18:30

15 February 2025 Friendly	Start (Norway)	0–0	(Norway) Egersund	Kristiansand
14:00		Report		Stadium: Sør Arena

20 February 2025 Friendly	Start (Norway)	3–0	(Norway) Arendal	Kristiansand
19:00		Report		Stadium: Sør Arena

28 February 2025 Friendly	Start (Norway)	3–1	(Norway) Jerv
18:00

4 March 2025 Friendly	Start (Norway)	0–2	(Norway) Rana
10:30

16 March 2025 Friendly	Start (Norway)	2–0	(Norway) Lyn
16:00

23 March 2025 Friendly	Viking (Norway)	3–4	(Norway) Start
16:00

== Competitions ==
=== Overview ===
Competition	First match	Last match	Starting round	Final position	Record							
Competition	First match	Last match	Starting round	Final position	Pld	W	D	L	GF	GA	GD	Win %
Norwegian First Division	31 March 2025	8 November 2025	Matchday 1	2nd	30	16	7	7	58	35	+23	53.33
Norwegian Football Cup	12 April 2025	24 April 2025	First round	Second round	2	1	0	1	6	5	+1	50.00
Norwegian Football Cup	13 August 2025	27 August 2025	First round	Second round	2	1	0	1	3	3	+0	50.00
Total					34	18	7	9	67	43	+24	52.94

Source: Competitions

=== First Division ===
==== League table ====
Pos	Team	Pld	W	D	L	GF	GA	GD	Pts	Promotion, qualification or relegation
1	Lillestrøm (C, P)	30	25	5	0	87	18	+69	80	Promotion to Eliteserien and qualification for the Europa League play-off round (Note: Lillestrøm qualified for the Europa League play-off round as winners of the 2025 Norwegian Football Cup.)
2	Start (P)	30	16	7	7	58	35	+23	55	Promotion to Eliteserien
3	Kongsvinger	30	15	9	6	61	42	+19	54	Qualification for the promotion play-offs third round
4	Aalesund (O, P)	30	14	10	6	56	35	+21	52	Qualification for the promotion play-offs second round
5	Egersund	30	15	7	8	51	38	+13	52	Qualification for the promotion play-offs first round

Source: OBOS-ligaen (in Norwegian)
Rules for classification: 1) Points; 2) Goal difference; 3) Goals scored; 4) Head-to-head points; 5) Head-to-head goal difference; 6) Head-to-head goals scored.
(C) Champions; (O) Play-off winners; (P) Promoted

==== Results summary ====
Overall								Home						Away					
Pld	W	D	L	GF	GA	GD	Pts	W	D	L	GF	GA	GD	W	D	L	GF	GA	GD
30	16	7	7	58	35	+23	55	9	1	5	34	21	+13	7	6	2	24	14	+10

Source: NFF

==== Results by round ====
Round	1	2	3	4	5	6	7	8	9	10	11	12	13	14	15	16	17	18	19	20	21	22	23	24	25	26	27	28	29	30
Ground	H	A	H	A	H	A	H	A	A	H	A	H	A	H	A	H	A	H	A	H	A	H	H	A	H	A	H	A	H	A
Result	W	W	L	W	L	D	W	D	W	D	W	W	D	L	W	W	W	W	L	W	D	L	L	L	W	D	W	D	W	W
Position	3	1	5	4	5	5	5	4	2	2	2	2	2	2	2	2	2	2	2	2	2	2	2	2	2	3	3	3	3	2

Source: NFF
A = Away; H = Home; W = Win; D = Draw; L = Loss

==== Matches ====
31 March 2025 1	Start	2–1	Sogndal	Kristiansand
19:00	Grundetjern 33'; Lorentzen 50'		Hovden Flataker 2' (pen.)	Stadium: Sør Arena; Referee: Harald Vollstad Sletner

5 April 2025 2	Skeid	1–3	Start	Oslo
16:00

21 April 2025 3	Start	1–2	Hødd	Kristiansand
17:00				Stadium: Sør Arena

28 April 2025 4	Mjøndalen	2–3	Start	Mjøndalen
19:00

3 May 2025 5	Start	2–3	Åsane	Kristiansand
16:00

11 May 2025 6	Raufoss	0–0	Start

16 May 2025 7	Start	2–1	Egersund

24 May 2025 8	Aalesund	1–1	Start

31 May 2025 9	Moss	0–3	Start

15 June 2025 10	Start	1–1	Lyn

18 June 2025 11	Ranheim	0–1	Start

21 June 2025 12	Start	5–1	Stabæk

28 June 2025 13	Odd	2–2	Start

26 July 2025 14	Start	0–3	Lillestrøm

30 July 2025 15	Kongsvinger	0–3	Start

2 August 2025 16	Start	4–0	Mjøndalen

6 August 2025 18	Start	2–0	Odd

10 August 2025 17	Hødd	0–2	Start

16 August 2025 19	Lillestrøm	3–0	Start

23 August 2025 20	Start	3–1	Aalesund

30 August 2025 21	Stabæk	1–1	Start

13 September 2025 22	Start	2–3	Kongsvinger

20 September 2025 23	Start	2–3	Ranheim

27 September 2025 24	Egersund	2–0	Start

4 October 2025 25	Start	4–0	Raufoss

18 October 2025 26	Sogndal	0–0	Start

22 October 2025 27	Start	2–1	Skeid

25 October 2025 28	Åsane	2–2	Start

1 November 2025 29	Start	2–1	Moss

8 November 2025 30	Lyn	0–3	Start

=== 2025 Norwegian Football Cup ===
12 April 2025 First round	Våg	2–4	Start	Kristiansand
13:00				Stadium: Karuss kunstgress

24 April 2025 Second round	Pors	3–2 (a.e.t.)	Start	Porsgrunn
18:00				Stadium: Pors Stadion KG

=== 2025–26 Norwegian Football Cup ===
13 August 2025 First round	Vigør	0–3	Start

27 August 2025 Second round	Eik Tønsberg	3–0	Start
