= 2025 Kongsvinger IL Toppfotball season =

Kongsvinger
2025 season
- Chairman: Jon Inge Høiland
- Head coach: Johan Vennberg
- Stadium: Gjemselund Stadion
- 1. divisjon: 3rd
- Promotion play-offs: Third round
- 2025 Norwegian Cup: Fourth round
- 2025–26 Norwegian Cup: Third round
- Biggest win: Ridabu 0–12 Kongsvinger
- Biggest defeat: Kongsvinger 0–3 Start
Home colours	Away colours

The 2025 season was the 134th in the history of Kongsvinger IL Toppfotball and their fourth consecutive season in the second tier of Norwegian football. The club competed in the Norwegian First Division and the Norwegian Football Cup.

== Transfers ==
=== In ===
Pos.	Player	Transferred from	Fee	Date	Source
FW	(Norway) Rasmus Christiansen	(Norway) Arendal	Loan return	31 December 2024	
DF	(Netherlands) Pim Saathof	(Netherlands) Go Ahead Eagles	Loan	24 March 2025	
GK	(Russia) Aleksei Gorodovoy	Unattached		27 March 2025	
DF	(Norway) Markus Flores	(Norway) Ull/Kisa	Undisclosed	18 July 2025	
MF	(Denmark) Frederik Christensen	(Denmark) Horsens	Free	7 August 2025	

== Friendlies ==
=== Pre-season ===
1 February 2025 Friendly	Kongsvinger (Norway)	6–0	(Norway) Eidsvold Turn
14:00

8 February 2025 Friendly	Kongsvinger (Norway)	6–1	(Norway) Strømmen
14:00

15 February 2025 Friendly	Kongsvinger (Norway)	2–3	(Norway) Lyn
14:00

22 February 2025 Friendly	Kongsvinger (Norway)	2–0	(Norway) Egersund
16:00

1 March 2025 Friendly	Sarpsborg 08 (Norway)	0–1	(Norway) Kongsvinger
17:00			Dybevik 45'

4 March 2025 Friendly	Åsane (Norway)	0–1	(Norway) Kongsvinger
16:30

15 March 2025 Friendly	Kalmar (Sweden)	1–2	(Norway) Kongsvinger
14:00

18 March 2025 Friendly	Kongsvinger (Norway)	1–1	(Norway) HamKam
13:00

23 March 2025 Friendly	Kongsvinger (Norway)	1–0	(Norway) Stabæk
15:00

== Competitions ==
=== Overview ===
Competition	First match	Last match	Starting round	Final position	Record							
Competition	First match	Last match	Starting round	Final position	Pld	W	D	L	GF	GA	GD	Win %
Norwegian First Division	31 March 2025	8 November 2025	Matchday 1	3rd	30	15	9	6	61	42	+19	50.00
Promotion play-offs	30 November 2025		Third round	Third round	1	0	0	1	4	5	−1	0.00
2025 Norwegian Football Cup	13 April 2025	20 May 2025	First round	Fourth round	4	2	1	1	24	8	+16	50.00
2026 Norwegian Football Cup	13 August 2025	17 September 2025	First round	Third round	3	2	0	1	10	4	+6	66.67
Total					38	19	10	9	99	59	+40	50.00

Source: Competitions

=== First Division ===
==== League table ====
Pos	Team	Pld	W	D	L	GF	GA	GD	Pts	Promotion, qualification or relegation
1	Lillestrøm (C, P)	30	25	5	0	87	18	+69	80	Promotion to Eliteserien and qualification for the Europa League play-off round (Note: Lillestrøm qualified for the Europa League play-off round as winners of the 2025 Norwegian Football Cup.)
2	Start (P)	30	16	7	7	58	35	+23	55	Promotion to Eliteserien
3	Kongsvinger	30	15	9	6	61	42	+19	54	Qualification for the promotion play-offs third round
4	Aalesund (O, P)	30	14	10	6	56	35	+21	52	Qualification for the promotion play-offs second round
5	Egersund	30	15	7	8	51	38	+13	52	Qualification for the promotion play-offs first round

Source: OBOS-ligaen (in Norwegian)
Rules for classification: 1) Points; 2) Goal difference; 3) Goals scored; 4) Head-to-head points; 5) Head-to-head goal difference; 6) Head-to-head goals scored.
(C) Champions; (O) Play-off winners; (P) Promoted

==== Results summary ====
Overall								Home						Away					
Pld	W	D	L	GF	GA	GD	Pts	W	D	L	GF	GA	GD	W	D	L	GF	GA	GD
30	15	9	6	61	42	+19	54	9	3	3	34	20	+14	6	6	3	27	22	+5

Source: NFF

==== Results by round ====
Round	1	2	3	4
Ground	H	A	H	A
Result	D	W	W	W
Position	9			

Source: NFF
A = Away; H = Home; W = Win; D = Draw; L = Loss

==== Matches ====
The league schedule was released on 20 December 2024.

31 March 2025 1	Kongsvinger	1–1	Åsane	Kongsvinger
19:00	Ramos Barmen 4' (o.g.)		Lie Skålevik 74'	Stadium: Gjemselund Stadion; Attendance: 1,662; Referee: Magnus Nicolai Koløy

5 April 2025 2	Hødd	0–2	Kongsvinger	Ulsteinvik
16:00 UTC+2			Dybevik 33'; Tangen Vinjor 90'	Stadium: Nye Høddvoll; Attendance: 1,357; Referee: Anders Bodding

21 April 2025 3	Kongsvinger	6–0	Moss	Kongsvinger
17:00				Stadium: Gjemselund Stadion

28 April 2025 4	Skeid	1–4	Kongsvinger	Oslo
19:00

3 May 2025 5	Ranheim	2–1	Kongsvinger	Ranheim
16:00

12 May 2025 6	Kongsvinger	1–3	Odd
19:00

16 May 2025 7	Lillestrøm	2–0	Kongsvinger
18:00

24 May 2025 8	Kongsvinger	2–1	Lyn
16:00

31 May 2025 9	Stabæk	2–2	Kongsvinger
16:00

14 June 2025 10	Kongsvinger	4–2	Sogndal
16:00

18 June 2025 11	Kongsvinger	3–0	Aalesund
19:00

21 June 2025 12	Egersund	2–2	Kongsvinger
14:00

28 June 2025 13	Kongsvinger	2–2	Raufoss
14:00

26 July 2025 14	Mjøndalen	1–1	Kongsvinger
14:00

30 July 2025 15	Kongsvinger	0–3	Start
18:00

2 August 2025 16	Aalesund	3–1	Kongsvinger
16:00

6 August 2025 18	Raufoss	2–2	Kongsvinger
19:00

10 August 2025 17	Kongsvinger	2–1	Stabæk
17:00

18 August 2025 19	Kongsvinger	4–3	Mjøndalen
19:00

23 August 2025 20	Odd	1–2	Kongsvinger
16:00

30 August 2025 21	Kongsvinger	1–1	Ranheim
16:00

13 September 2025 22	Start	2–3	Kongsvinger
16:00

21 September 2025 23	Kongsvinger	2–1	Egersund
17:00

28 September 2025 24	Sogndal	2–2	Kongsvinger
14:30

4 October 2025 25	Kongsvinger	3–0	Skeid
16:00

18 October 2025 26	Moss	2–4	Kongsvinger
16:00

22 October 2025 27	Kongsvinger	3–0	Hødd
18:00

25 October 2025 28	Lyn	0–1	Kongsvinger
16:00

1 November 2025 29	Kongsvinger	0–2	Lillestrøm
16:00

8 November 2025 30	Åsane	0–0	Kongsvinger
16:00

==== Promotion play-offs ====
30 November 2025 Third round	Kongsvinger	4–5 (a.e.t.)	Aalesund
14:00

=== 2025 Norwegian Football Cup ===
13 April 2025 First round	Ridabu	0–12	Kongsvinger	Ridabu
16:00				Stadium: Black River Park kunstgress Attendance: 314; Referee: Markus Rotvold Hammarstrøm

24 April 2025 Second round	Elverum	2–7	Kongsvinger	Elverum
18:00				Stadium: Elverum Stadion 11er Attendance: 450; Referee: Ali al Hatam

7 May 2025 Third round	Sogndal	3–3 (a.e.t.) (3–4 p)	Kongsvinger	Sogndal
19:00				Stadium: Fosshaugane Campus

20 May 2025 Fourth round	Kongsvinger	2–3 (a.e.t.)	Rosenborg	Kongsvinger
20:00

=== 2026 Norwegian Football Cup ===
13 August 2025 First round	Brumunddal	1–5	Kongsvinger
18:00

27 August 2025 Second round	Junkeren	0–4	Kongsvinger
18:00

17 September 2025 Third round	Kongsvinger	1–3	KFUM Oslo
18:00
