= 2026 Moss FK season =

Moss
2026 season
- Chairman: Torfinn Hansen
- Head coach: Ole Martin Nesselquist
- Stadium: Melløs Stadion
- 1. divisjon: 8th
- 2026–27 Norwegian Cup: Pre-season
Home colours	Away colours

== Transfers ==
=== Out ===
Pos.	Player	Transferred to	Fee	Date	Source
DF	(Somalia) Saadiq Faisal Elmi	(Norway) Raufoss		30 March 2026	
FW	(Italy) Leonardo Rossi	(Norway) Åsane Fotball		31 March 2026	

== Pre-season and friendlies ==
24 January 2026	Moss	0–3	Kjelsås

31 January 2026	Moss	2–0	Strømmen

6 February 2026	Sarpsborg 08	3–1	Moss

14 February 2026	Moss	6–1	Follo

17 February 2026	Moss	3–0	Arendal

20 February 2026	Mjøndalen	3–2	Moss

27 February 2026	Raufoss	3–3	Moss	Raufoss
				Stadium: Raufoss Industripark Arena

7 March 2026	Hafnarfjarðar (Iceland)	1–1	Moss

13 March 2026	Odd	2–0	Moss

21 March 2026	Lyn	3–1	Moss

29 March 2026	Stabæk	2–0	Moss

== Competitions ==
=== Overall record ===
Competition	First match	Last match	Starting round	Record							
Competition	First match	Last match	Starting round	Pld	W	D	L	GF	GA	GD	Win %
Norwegian First Division	6 April 2026		Matchday 1	11	5	2	4	20	22	−2	45.45
2026–27 Norwegian Football Cup				0	0	0	0	0	0	+0	—
Total				11	5	2	4	20	22	−2	45.45

Source: Competitions

=== Norwegian First Division ===
Pos	Team	Pld	W	D	L	GF	GA	GD	Pts	Promotion, qualification or relegation
5	Stabæk	12	6	3	3	25	14	+11	21	Qualification for the promotion play-offs first round
6	Ranheim	12	6	2	4	32	26	+6	20	Qualification for the promotion play-offs first round
7	Moss	12	5	2	5	21	26	−5	17	
8	Sandnes Ulf	12	5	1	6	18	19	−1	16	
9	Egersund	12	5	1	6	19	21	−2	16	

Updated to match(es) played on 21 June 2026. Source: OBOS-ligaen (in Norwegian)
Rules for classification: 1) Points; 2) Goal difference; 3) Goals scored; 4) Head-to-head points; 5) Head-to-head goal difference; 6) Head-to-head goals scored.

==== Results summary ====
Overall								Home						Away					
Pld	W	D	L	GF	GA	GD	Pts	W	D	L	GF	GA	GD	W	D	L	GF	GA	GD
0	0	0	0	0	0	0	0	0	0	0	0	0	0	0	0	0	0	0	0

==== Results by round ====
Round	1	2	3	4	5	6	7	8	9	10
Ground	A	H	A	H	A	H	A	H	A	H
Result	W	W	L	W	L	L	W	D	L	D
Position										

A = Away; H = Home; W = Win; D = Draw; L = Loss

==== Matches ====
The match schedule was issued on 19 December 2025.

6 April 2026 1	Åsane	2–3	Moss

12 April 2026 2	Moss	1–0	Hødd

18 April 2026 3	Kongsvinger	2–1	Moss

26 April 2026 4	Moss	2–1	Lyn

1 May 2026 5	Ranheim	4–0	Moss

10 May 2026 6	Moss	2–3	Bryne

16 May 2026 7	Odd	1–2	Moss

20 May 2026 8	Moss	1–1	Strømsgodset

25 May 2026 9	Haugesund	3–1	Moss

30 May 2026 10	Moss	2–2	Stabæk

14 June 2026 11	Sogndal	2–4	Moss	Sogndalsfjøra
16:00				Stadium: Fosshaugane Campus

4 July 2026 14	Egersund	3–0	Moss	Egersund
14:00

=== Norwegian Football Cup ===
22–23 August 2026 First round	Lørenskog	v	Moss
