= Sebastian Haugland =

Norwegian footballer (born 1996)

Personal information
- Full name: Sebastian Heimvik Haugland
- Date of birth: 12 June 1996 (age 30)
- Place of birth: Bergen, Norway
- Position: Forward

Team information
- Current team: Ranheim
- Number: 9

Senior career*
Years	Team	Apps	(Gls)
2014–2022	Arna-Bjørnar	128	(40)
2023–2024	IL Sandviken	43	(41)
2024–2025	Åsane	26	(9)
2025	Hødd	17	(8)
2026	Þór Akureyri	9	(1)
2026–	Ranheim	14	(1)
- * Club domestic league appearances and goals as of 14 November 2026

Sebastian Heimvik Haugland (born 12 June 1996) is a Norwegian professional footballer who plays as a forward for Norwegian 1. Divisjon side Ranheim.

== Club career ==
In July 2024, Haugland joined Åsane Fotball.

== Career statistics ==
As of match played 2 October 2026

Appearances and goals by club, season and competition
Club	Season	League			Cup		Total	
Club	Season	Division	Apps	Goals	Apps	Goals	Apps	Goals
IL Sandviken	2023	Norsk Tipping-Ligaen	25	19	2	4	27	23
IL Sandviken	2024	Norsk Tipping-Ligaen	15	17	1	1	16	18
IL Sandviken	Total		40	36	3	5	43	41
Åssne	2024	OBOS-ligaen	14	8	0	0	14	8
Åssne	2025	OBOS-ligaen	12	1	3	2	15	3
Åssne	Total		26	9	3	2	29	11
Hødd	2025	OBOS-ligaen	17	8	0	0	17	8
Hødd	Total		17	8	0	0	17	8
Þór Akureyri	2026	Besta deild karla	9	1	1	0	10	1
Þór Akureyri	Total		9	1	1	0	10	1
Ranheim	2026	OBOS-ligaen	10	1	2	1	12	2
Ranheim	Total		10	1	2	1	12	2
Career total			102	55	9	8	111	63
