= 2025 Norwegian First Division =

Association football season in Norway

Norwegian First Division
- Season: 2025
- Dates: 31 March – 8 November
- Champions: Lillestrøm (1st title)
- Promoted: Lillestrøm; Start; Aalesund
- Relegated: Mjøndalen; Skeid
- Matches: 240
- Goals: 767 (3.2 per match)
- Best player: Lucas Haren
- Top goalscorer: Lucas Haren; Thomas Lehne Olsen (20 goals each)
- Best goalkeeper: Mads Hedenstad Christiansen (15 clean sheets)
- Biggest home win: Kongsvinger 6–0 Moss (21 April 2025); Aalesund 6–0 Ranheim (18 August 2025)
- Biggest away win: Mjøndalen 0–6 Lillestrøm (24 May 2025); Mjøndalen 0–6 Aalesund (18 October 2025); Odd 1–7 Lillestrøm (22 October 2025)
- Highest scoring: Odd 1–7 Lillestrøm (22 October 2025)
- Longest winning run: 17 matches Lillestrøm
- Longest unbeaten run: 30 matches Lillestrøm
- Longest winless run: 17 matches Skeid
- Longest losing run: 7 matches Skeid
- Highest attendance: 10,225; Aalesund - Hødd (16 May 2025)
- Lowest attendance: 200; Skeid - Odd (8 November 2025)
- Total attendance: 532,718
- Average attendance: 2,220

The 2025 Norwegian First Division (referred to as OBOS-ligaen for sponsorship reasons) is a Norwegian second-tier football league season. The season started on 31 March 2025 and ended on 8 November 2025, not including play-off matches.

== Teams ==
Locations of teams in the 2025 Norwegian First Division
Locations of teams in the 2025 Norwegian First Division in Oslo

The following teams have changed division since the 2024 season:

=== To First Division ===
Promoted from Second Division

- Hødd
- Skeid

Relegated from Eliteserien

- Lillestrøm
- Odd

=== From First Division ===
Promoted to Eliteserien

- Vålerenga
- Bryne

Relegated to Second Division

- Levanger
- Sandnes Ulf

=== Stadiums and locations ===
Team	Location	County	Arena	Turf	Capacity
Aalesund	Ålesund	Møre og Romsdal	Color Line Stadion	Artificial	10,778
Egersund	Egersund	Rogaland	B&G Parken	Artificial	1,200
Hødd	Ulsteinvik	Møre og Romsdal	Høddvoll	Artificial	4,081
Kongsvinger	Kongsvinger	Innlandet	Gjemselund	Artificial	5,824
Lillestrøm	Lillestrøm	Akershus	Åråsen	Natural	10,540
Lyn	Oslo	Oslo	Bislett (Note: Lyn played three home games at KFUM Arena.)	Natural	15,400
Mjøndalen	Mjøndalen	Buskerud	Consto Arena	Artificial	4,200
Moss	Moss	Østfold	Melløs	Natural	2,373
Odd	Skien	Telemark	Skagerak Arena	Artificial	11,767
Ranheim	Trondheim	Trøndelag	EXTRA Arena (Note: Ranheim played one home game at Frøya Storhall.)	Artificial	3,000
Raufoss	Raufoss	Innlandet	NAMMO Stadion	Artificial	1,800
Skeid	Oslo	Oslo	OBOS Idrettspark Nordre Åsen (Note: Skeid played one home game at Intility Arena.)	Artificial	1,486
Sogndal	Sogndalsfjøra	Vestland	Fosshaugane Campus	Artificial	5,622
Stabæk	Bærum	Akershus	Nadderud	Artificial	4,542
Start	Kristiansand	Agder	Sparebanken Norge Arena Kristiansand	Artificial	14,448
Åsane	Bergen	Vestland	Åsane Arena	Artificial	3,300

=== Personnel and kits ===
Team	Manager	Captain	Kit manufacturer	Shirt sponsor
Aalesund	(Norway) Kjetil Rekdal	(Denmark) Paul Ngongo	Umbro	Sparebanken Møre
Egersund	(Norway) Endre Eide	(Norway) Chris Sleveland	Macron	Sparebanken Norge
Hødd	(Norway) Marius Bøe	(Norway) Torbjørn Kallevåg	Puma	Sparebanken Møre
Kongsvinger	(Sweden) Johan Wennberg	(Norway) Andreas Dybevik	Umbro	Mapei
Lillestrøm	(Norway) Hans Erik Ødegaard	(Norway) Ruben Gabrielsen	Puma	Romerike Sparebank
Lyn	(Norway) Magnus Aadland	(Norway) William Sell	Hummel	OBOS
Mjøndalen	(Scotland) Kevin Nicol	(Norway) Erik Midtgarden	Umbro	Sparebanken Øst
Moss	(Norway) Ole Martin Nesselquist	(Norway) Kristian Strande	Select	SpareBank 1 Østfold Akershus
Odd	(Denmark) Per Frandsen	(Norway) Steffen Hagen	Hummel	Skagerak Energi
Ranheim	(Norway) Christian Eggen Rismark	(Norway) Philip Slørdahl	Umbro	SpareBank 1 SMN
Raufoss	(Sweden) Jörgen Wålemark	(Norway) Ole Amund Sveen	Puma	Nammo
Skeid	(Norway) Vilde Mollestad Rislaa	(Norway) Bendik Rise	Adidas	OBOS
Sogndal	(Portugal) Luís Pimenta	(Norway) Per-Egil Flo	Umbro	Sparebanken Norge
Stabæk	(Sweden) Mikael Stahre	(Norway) Nicolai Næss	Nike	SpareBank 1 Østlandet
Start	(Norway) Azar Karadas	(Norway) Eirik Schulze	Macron	Sparebanken Norge
Åsane	(Norway) Eirik Bakke	(Norway) Kristoffer Barmen	Craft	Tertnes Holding

=== Managerial changes ===
Team	Outgoing manager	Manner of departure	Date of vacancy	Position in the table	Incoming manager	Date of appointment
Stabæk	(Norway) Bjørn Helge Riise (caretaker)	End of caretaker spell	9 December 2024	Pre-season	(Sweden) Jörgen Wålemark	9 December 2024
Raufoss	(Sweden) Jörgen Wålemark	Contract expired	31 December 2024	Pre-season	(England) Tom Dent	1 January 2025
Sogndal	(Norway) Morten Kalvenes	Contract expired	31 December 2024	Pre-season	(Portugal) Luís Pimenta	1 January 2025
Lillestrøm	(Norway) Dag-Eilev Fagermo	Contraxt expired	31 December 2024	Pre-season	(Norway) Hans Erik Ødegaard	1 January 2025
Egersund	(Norway) Kjell André Thu	Contract expired	31 December 2024	Pre-season	(Norway) Endre Eide	1 January 2025
Ranheim	(Norway) Kåre Ingebrigtsen	Appointed sporting director	31 December 2024	Pre-season	(Norway) Christian Eggen Rismark	1 January 2025
Lyn	(Norway) Jan Halvor Halvorsen	Mutual consent	2 June 2025	15th	(Norway) Magnus Aadland	4 June 2025
Moss	(Norway) Thomas Myhre	Signed by HamKam	24 June 2025	11th	(Norway) Niclas Wenderyd (caretaker)	24 June 2025
Stabæk	(Sweden) Jörgen Wålemark	Mutual consent	9 July 2025	14th	(Norway) Bjørn Helge Riise (caretaker)	9 July 2025
Moss	(Norway) Niclas Wenderyd (caretaker)	End of caretaker spell	11 July 2025	12th	(Norway) Ole Martin Nesselquist	11 July 2025
Stabæk	(Norway) Bjørn Helge Riise (caretaker)	End of caretaker spell	15 August 2025	14th	(Sweden) Mikael Stahre	15 August 2025
Odd	(Norway) Knut Rønningene	Sacked	15 September 2025	13th	(Denmark) Per Frandsen	17 September 2025

== League table ==
Pos	Team	Pld	W	D	L	GF	GA	GD	Pts	Promotion, qualification or relegation
1	Lillestrøm (C, P)	30	25	5	0	87	18	+69	80	Promotion to Eliteserien and qualification for the Europa League play-off round (Note: Lillestrøm qualified for the Europa League play-off round as winners of the 2025 Norwegian Football Cup.)
2	Start (P)	30	16	7	7	58	35	+23	55	Promotion to Eliteserien
3	Kongsvinger	30	15	9	6	61	42	+19	54	Qualification for the promotion play-offs third round
4	Aalesund (O, P)	30	14	10	6	56	35	+21	52	Qualification for the promotion play-offs second round
5	Egersund	30	15	7	8	51	38	+13	52	Qualification for the promotion play-offs first round
6	Ranheim	30	14	6	10	48	48	0	48	Qualification for the promotion play-offs first round
7	Lyn	30	14	5	11	48	37	+11	47	
8	Sogndal	30	12	7	11	49	48	+1	43	
9	Odd	30	8	9	13	37	50	−13	33	
10	Hødd	30	8	9	13	34	52	−18	33	
11	Stabæk	30	7	10	13	45	53	−8	31	
12	Åsane	30	7	10	13	38	53	−15	31	
13	Raufoss (Note: Raufoss were deducted 1 point.)	30	7	9	14	43	56	−13	29	
14	Moss (O)	30	7	7	16	41	65	−24	28	Qualification for the relegation play-offs
15	Mjøndalen (R)	30	6	7	17	36	71	−35	25	Relegation to Second Division
16	Skeid (R)	30	2	9	19	35	66	−31	15	Relegation to Second Division

Source: OBOS-ligaen (in Norwegian)
Rules for classification: 1) Points; 2) Goal difference; 3) Goals scored; 4) Head-to-head points; 5) Head-to-head goal difference; 6) Head-to-head goals scored.
(C) Champions; (O) Play-off winners; (P) Promoted; (R) Relegated

== Results ==
Home \ Away	AAL	EGE	HØD	KON	LIL	LYN	MJØ	MOS	ODD	RAN	RAU	SKE	SOG	STB	STR	ÅSA
Aalesund	—	2–3	2–0	3–1	2–2	2–1	0–0	2–0	1–0	6–0	3–1	3–0	2–0	2–2	1–1	3–0
Egersund	2–2	—	0–0	2–2	0–2	0–5	3–2	2–0	1–0	3–4	4–0	4–3	0–2	1–1	2–0	1–1
Hødd	0–0	1–0	—	0–2	2–2	0–1	3–1	2–1	3–1	0–1	2–4	1–1	2–1	1–3	0–2	3–3
Kongsvinger	3–0	2–1	3–0	—	0–2	2–1	4–3	6–0	1–3	1–1	2–2	3–0	4–2	2–1	0–3	1–1
Lillestrøm	5–1	1–0	4–0	2–0	—	5–1	4–1	3–0	1–0	2–1	2–1	3–1	0–0	3–0	3–0	2–2
Lyn	2–2	1–1	0–1	0–1	0–1	—	1–3	4–0	0–0	2–1	3–2	1–1	2–1	0–1	0–3	2–1
Mjøndalen	0–6	1–2	1–1	1–1	0–6	0–1	—	2–2	1–1	1–4	1–1	1–4	2–3	3–2	2–3	2–0
Moss	1–1	2–4	3–1	2–4	1–5	2–0	3–1	—	2–2	2–0	1–1	2–1	3–1	4–2	0–3	1–2
Odd	1–0	1–1	1–2	1–2	1–7	2–1	1–1	2–0	—	1–1	1–2	2–1	1–4	2–0	2–2	1–0
Ranheim	2–1	0–4	2–1	2–1	0–4	0–3	3–0	0–0	3–1	—	1–1	4–2	1–2	1–1	0–1	5–2
Raufoss	0–1	0–1	6–1	2–2	1–2	0–3	0–1	3–2	1–1	1–2	—	1–1	1–3	1–0	0–0	3–2
Skeid	1–1	0–2	1–1	1–4	1–1	2–3	1–2	1–1	5–2	0–0	1–4	—	1–4	0–5	1–3	1–2
Sogndal	3–4	0–1	2–1	2–2	1–5	1–2	1–0	3–1	3–2	0–3	2–2	1–1	—	1–1	0–0	2–0
Stabæk	1–2	1–3	1–1	2–2	0–3	1–5	4–0	3–3	2–2	1–2	3–0	1–0	1–2	—	1–1	2–0
Start	3–1	2–1	1–2	2–3	0–3	1–1	4–0	2–1	2–0	2–3	4–0	2–1	2–1	5–1	—	2–3
Åsane	0–0	0–2	2–2	0–0	1–2	0–2	2–3	2–1	0–2	2–1	4–2	2–1	1–1	1–1	2–2	—

Source: OBOS-ligaen (in Norwegian)
Legend: Blue = home team win; Yellow = draw; Red = away team win.

== Positions by round ==
Team ╲ Round	1	2	3	4	5	6	7	8	9	10	11	12	13	14	15	16	17	18	19	20	21	22	23	24	25	26	27	28	29	30
Lillestrøm	6	5	3	3	1	1	1	1	1	1	1	1	1	1	1	1	1	1	1	1	1	1	1	1	1	1	1	1	1	1
Start	3	1	5	4	5	5	5	4	2	2	2	2	2	2	2	2	2	2	2	2	2	2	2	2	2	3	3	3	3	2
Kongsvinger	8	3	2	2	3	3	8	6	5	3	3	3	3	3	3	6	4	5	5	4	4	3	3	3	4	2	2	2	2	3
Aalesund	6	4	7	6	4	4	3	3	6	7	9	6	6	4	4	3	5	3	3	5	6	5	5	5	5	4	4	4	4	4
Egersund	2	1	1	1	2	2	2	5	7	9	6	5	4	7	9	5	3	7	7	7	7	7	8	8	6	6	5	5	5	5
Ranheim	16	16	16	13	11	9	9	12	9	6	7	10	8	5	5	4	6	8	8	8	8	8	7	6	7	7	7	7	7	6
Lyn	1	7	10	12	14	14	14	14	15	15	14	14	13	11	12	10	8	6	6	6	5	4	4	4	3	5	6	6	6	7
Sogndal	14	14	11	7	6	8	6	2	3	5	4	4	5	6	8	7	7	4	4	3	3	6	6	7	8	8	8	8	8	8
Odd	3	10	6	8	7	6	4	7	4	4	5	7	7	8	6	8	9	10	9	11	12	13	10	9	9	9	9	9	9	9
Hødd	8	12	8	10	8	7	10	8	8	8	10	12	9	9	7	9	10	11	11	10	13	9	9	10	10	10	10	11	10	10
Stabæk	8	6	9	11	9	11	7	11	11	10	12	13	14	14	14	14	14	14	14	14	14	14	14	14	14	13	12	10	11	11
Åsane	8	12	14	15	13	13	13	13	13	13	13	9	11	12	13	13	12	13	10	9	10	12	13	11	11	11	11	12	12	12
Raufoss	5	8	4	5	10	12	12	10	10	11	11	8	10	10	11	12	11	9	12	12	9	11	12	13	13	14	14	13	13	13
Moss	12	9	12	9	12	10	11	9	12	12	8	11	12	13	10	11	13	12	13	13	11	10	11	12	12	12	13	14	14	14
Mjøndalen	12	11	13	14	15	15	16	16	14	14	15	15	15	16	15	15	15	15	15	15	15	15	15	15	15	15	15	15	15	15
Skeid	14	15	15	16	16	16	15	15	16	16	16	16	16	15	16	16	16	16	16	16	16	16	16	16	16	16	16	16	16	16

Promotion to 2026 Eliteserien
Promotion play-offs
Relegation play-offs
Relegation to 2026 2. divisjon

Source: nifs.no

== Results by round ==
Team ╲ Round	1	2	3	4	5	6	7	8	9	10	11	12	13	14	15	16	17	18	19	20	21	22	23	24	25	26	27	28	29	30
Aalesund	D	W	D	D	W	D	W	D	L	D	L	W	D	W	D	W	L	W	W	L	L	W	W	L	W	W	W	D	W	D
Egersund	W	W	W	W	D	D	L	L	L	L	W	D	W	L	L	W	W	L	D	D	W	D	L	W	W	W	W	W	D	W
Hødd	D	L	W	L	W	W	L	W	D	D	L	L	W	D	W	L	L	L	D	D	L	W	W	L	L	D	L	L	D	D
Kongsvinger	D	W	W	W	L	L	L	W	D	W	W	D	D	D	L	L	W	D	W	W	D	W	W	D	W	W	W	W	L	D
Lillestrøm	D	W	W	W	W	D	W	W	W	D	D	W	D	W	W	W	W	W	W	W	W	W	W	W	W	W	W	W	W	W
Lyn	W	L	L	L	L	L	D	L	L	D	W	W	W	W	D	W	W	W	D	W	D	W	W	W	W	L	L	L	W	L
Mjøndalen	L	D	D	L	L	L	L	L	W	D	D	L	L	D	W	L	L	W	L	D	L	L	L	W	W	L	L	D	W	L
Moss	L	W	L	W	L	W	L	W	L	D	W	L	L	L	W	D	L	D	D	L	W	D	L	L	L	L	L	D	L	D
Odd	W	L	W	L	D	W	W	L	W	D	D	L	D	L	W	L	L	L	D	L	D	L	W	W	D	D	L	D	L	L
Ranheim	L	L	L	W	W	W	D	L	W	W	L	L	W	W	D	W	L	D	L	D	D	W	W	W	L	D	W	L	W	W
Raufoss	W	D	W	L	L	D	D	W	D	D	L	W	D	D	L	L	W	D	L	L	W	L	L	L	L	L	L	W	L	D
Skeid	L	L	L	L	L	D	D	L	D	L	L	W	D	D	D	D	L	L	D	L	L	D	L	L	L	L	L	L	L	W
Sogndal	L	L	W	W	W	L	W	W	D	L	W	L	D	D	L	D	W	W	W	W	D	L	L	D	L	D	W	L	W	L
Stabæk	D	W	L	L	W	D	W	L	D	D	L	L	L	D	L	D	L	L	L	D	D	D	W	L	D	W	W	W	L	L
Start	W	W	L	W	L	D	W	D	W	D	W	W	D	L	W	W	W	W	L	W	D	L	L	L	W	D	W	D	W	W
Åsane	D	L	L	D	W	D	L	W	L	W	D	W	L	D	L	L	W	L	W	D	D	L	L	W	L	D	L	D	L	D

Source: Football Association of Norway (in Norwegian)
W = Win; D = Draw; L = Loss

== Play-offs ==
=== Promotion play-offs ===
The teams from third to sixth place will take part in the promotion play-offs; these are single leg knockout matches. In the first round, the fifth-placed team will play at home against the sixth-placed team. The winner of the first round will meet the fourth-placed team on away ground in the second round. The winner of the second round will meet the third-placed team on away ground. The winner of the third round will face Bryne, the 14th-placed team in the Eliteserien over two legs in the Eliteserien play-offs for a spot in the top-flight next season.

==== Bracket ====
First round
5	Egersund	3
6	Ranheim	2

Second round
4	Aalesund	3
5	Egersund	1

Third round
3	Kongsvinger	4
4	Aalesund (a.e.t.)	5

==== First round ====
22 November 2025
16:00 CET

Egersund	3–2	Ranheim
Sauer 45+2'; Kapskarmo 84'; Vatne 90+6'	Report	Johnsen 39'; Samuelsen 68' (pen.)

Idrettsparken, Egersund
Attendance: 1,074
Referee: Stian Røvig Sletner

==== Second round ====
26 November 2025
18:00 CET

Aalesund	3–1 (a.e.t.)	Egersund
Lonebu 90+2'; Heiselberg 93'; Jóhannsson 119'	Report	Kapskarmo 8'

Color Line Stadion, Ålesund
Attendance: 2,458
Referee: Steinar Hauge

==== Third round ====
30 November 2025
14:00 CET

Kongsvinger	4–5 (a.e.t.)	Aalesund
Haren 25' (pen.); Christiansen 30'; Grundt 55'; Vinjor 76'	Report	Melland 22'; Ngongo 28', 37'; Lonebu 49'; Aukland 112'

Gjemselund Stadion, Kongsvinger
Referee: Svein Tore Sinnes

=== Relegation play-offs ===
The 14th-placed team took part in a two-legged play-off against the winners of the Second Division play-offs, to decide who would play in the First Division next season.

23 November 2025
14:00 CET

Moss	2–1	Brattvåg
Musbaudeen 16'; Fuglestad 90+6'	Report	Flem 2'

Melløs Stadion, Moss
Attendance: 1,863
Referee: Ali al Hatam
29 November 2025
13:00 CET

Brattvåg	2–1 (a.e.t.)	Moss
Solnørdal 62'; Stølan 67'	Report	Stølan 78' (o.g.)
Penalties
Solnørdal (penalty missed); Stølan (penalty missed); Vinje (penalty scored); Nytoft (penalty scored)	2–4	Fuglestad (penalty missed); Krohg (penalty scored); Alexandersson (penalty scored); Eriksen (penalty scored); Memedov (penalty scored)

Brattvåg Stadion, Brattvåg
Attendance: 1,014
Referee: Harald Vollstad Sletner

== Season statistics ==
=== Top scorers ===
Rank	Player	Club(s)	Goals
1	(Denmark) Lucas Haren	Kongsvinger	20
1	(Norway) Thomas Lehne Olsen	Lillestrøm	20
3	(Norway) Andreas Hellum	Lyn	15
4	(Sweden) Oliver Hintsa	Sogndal	14
4	(Norway) Eric Kitolano	Lillestrøm	14
6	(Norway) Markus Karlsbakk	Lillestrøm	13
6	(Norway) Håkon Lorentzen	Start	13
8	(Norway) Sebastian Pedersen	Sogndal	12
9	(Norway) Martin Hoel Andersen	Skeid	11
9	(Norway) Oscar Kapskarmo	Egersund	11
9	(Norway) Eirik Schulze	Start	11

=== Clean sheets ===
Rank	Player	Club	Clean sheets
1	(Norway) Mads Hedenstad Christiansen	Lillestrøm	15
2	(Norway) Sten Grytebust	Aalesund	12
3	(Denmark) Jacob Pryts	Start	10
4	(Denmark) Andreas Hermansen	Egersund	9
5	(Norway) Alexander Pedersen	Lyn	8
6	(Russia) Aleksei Gorodovoy	Kongsvinger	7
7	(Norway) André Hansen	Odd	5
7	(Norway) Lars Jendal	Sogndal	5
7	(Norway) Simen Vidtun Nilsen	Ranheim	5
10	(Norway) Marius Ulla	Hødd	4

=== Hat-tricks ===
Player	For	Against	Result	Date
(Denmark) Lucas Haren	Kongsvinger	Moss	6–0 (H)	21 April 2025
(Norway) Mathias Grundetjern	Start	Stabæk	5–1 (H)	21 June 2025
(Norway) Thomas Lehne Olsen	Lillestrøm	Mjøndalen	4–1 (H)	20 September 2025
(Norway) Eric Kitolano	Lillestrøm	Odd	7–1 (A)	22 October 2025
(Norway) Andreas Hellum	Lyn	Stabæk	1–5 (A)	2 November 2025

=== Discipline ===
==== Player ====
- Most yellow cards: 8
  - (Ghana) Emmanuel Danso (Stabæk)
  - (Sweden) Victor Fors (Raufoss)
  - (Norway) Mirza Mulac (Hødd)
  - (Denmark) Paul Ngongo (Aaalesund)
  - (Sweden) Paya Pichkah (Egersund)
- Most red cards: 2
  - (Senegal) Famara Camara (Ranheim)
  - (Ghana) Emmanuel Danso (Stabæk)
  - (England) Ryan Lee Nelson (Raufoss)

==== Club ====
- Most yellow cards: 60
  - Mjøndalen
- Fewest yellow cards: 39
  - Lillestrøm
- Most red cards: 5
  - Ranheim
- Fewest red cards: 0
  - Lillestrøm
  - Sogndal
  - Start

== Awards ==
=== Monthly awards ===
Month	Coach of the Month		Player of the Month		Young Player of the Month		References
Month	Coach	Club	Player	Club	Player	Club	References
April	(Norway) Endre Eide	Egersund	(Denmark) Lucas Haren	Kongsvinger	(Norway) Erik Flataker	Sogndal	
May	(Norway) Hans Erik Ødegaard	Lillestrøm	(Norway) Markus Karlsbakk	Lillestrøm	(Norway) Sander Granheim	Sogndal	
June/July	(Norway) Magnus Aadland	Lyn	(Denmark) Lucas Haren	Kongsvinger	(Morocco) Salim Laghzaoui	Lyn	
August	(Norway) Hans Erik Ødegaard	Lillestrøm	(Estonia) Markus Soomets	Start	(Norway) Harald Woxen	Lillestrøm	
September	(Norway) Magnus Aadland	Lyn	(Norway) Thomas Lehne Olsen	Lillestrøm	(Senegal) Massiré Sylla	Lyn	
October	(Norway) Endre Eide	Egersund	(Norway) Eric Kitolano	Lillestrøm	(Denmark) Andreas Hermansen	Egersund	

=== Annual awards ===
Award	Winner	Club
Coach of the Year	(Norway) Hans Erik Ødegaard	Lillestrøm
Player of the Year	(Denmark) Lucas Haren	Kongsvinger
Young Player of the Year	(Senegal) Massiré Sylla	Lyn

== League attendances ==
Pos	Team	Total	High	Low	Average	Change
1	Lillestrøm	93,158	9,397	4,704	6,211	−15.7%^{1}
2	Start	65,861	6,702	2,685	4,391	+36.9%
3	Aalesund	64,057	10,225	3,226	4,270	+11.8%
4	Odd	49,360	4,928	2,654	3,291	−30.5%^{1}
5	Lyn	40,331	7,012	1,395	2,689	−27.2%
6	Stabæk	36,871	4,321	1,834	2,458	−6.9%
7	Sogndal	29,987	3,676	1,617	1,999	−4.0%
8	Kongsvinger	27,198	4,507	1,092	1,813	−2.9%
9	Moss	24,866	3,170	1,142	1,658	−10.9%
10	Hødd	21,313	3,475	997	1,421	+27.7%^{2}
11	Mjøndalen	17,971	1,867	771	1,198	−21.4%
12	Raufoss	14,667	2,178	507	978	−5.8%
13	Ranheim	14,493	1,863	456	966	−25.2%
14	Egersund	13,079	1,404	703	872	−14.9%
15	Skeid	10,757	1,600	200	717	+49.7%^{2}
16	Åsane	8,749	1,103	322	583	−19.8%
	League total	532,718	10,225	200	2,220	−9.1%

Notes:
1: Team played last season in Eliteserien.
2: Team played last season in 2. divisjon.

== See also ==
- 2025 Eliteserien
- 2025 Norwegian Second Division
- 2025 Norwegian Third Division
- 2025 Norwegian Football Cup
- 2025–26 Norwegian Football Cup
