= Paul Ngongo =

Danish footballer (born 2000)

Personal information
- Full name: Paul Ngongo Iversen
- Date of birth: 23 May 2000 (age 26)
- Place of birth: Copenhagen, Denmark
- Height: 1.90 m (6 ft 3 in)
- Position: Striker

Team information
- Current team: Aalesund
- Number: 9

Youth career
- Skjold
- Hvidovre
- –2020: Wingate Bulldogs

Senior career*
| Years | Team | Apps | (Gls) |
| 2020–2021 | Frem | 14 | (14) |
| 2021–2024 | Kolding | 47 | (22) |
| 2024– | Aalesund | 39 | (12) |
- * Club domestic league appearances and goals as of 17 October 2026

Paul Ngongo Iversen (born 23 May 2000) is a Danish footballer who plays as a striker for Aalesund.

== Personal life ==
Born in Copenhagen, he is of partial Congolese descent.

While playing in the lower divisions, Ngongo also ran a construction company for two years until it went bankrupt.

== Career ==
Ngongo played youth football for BK Skjold, then on the U17 and U19 teams of Hvidovre IF. Instead of progressing into senior football, he went to the United States to play collegiately for the Wingate Bulldogs. The COVID-19 pandemic then contributed to his returning home to Copenhagen in 2020.

Ngongo made his debut in the 2019-20 Danish 2nd Division, scoring 3 times in 4 appearances, followed by 11 goals in 10 appearances in 2020-21. He was then brought to Jutland club Kolding IF, winning promotion from the 2022-23 Danish 2nd Division. He was declared Player of the Year in Kolding IF in 2022–23. Ngongo also became vice captain after spending 5 months in Kolding. In the summer window of 2024, Ngongo was bought by Norwegian First Division club Aalesunds FK, in what was described as Kolding's largest sale ever.

Ngongo knew of other players who had become professional outside of the elite clubs' academy systems. In BK Frem he played with Tonni Adamsen who was a part-time window cleaner at the time, and Henrik Meister had recently moved to a Big 5 club from the Norwegian league.

In 2024, Aalesund struggled to avoid relegation, but Ngongo received "half a promise" that the club would manage to turn things around with a new manager and an influx of new players. After the club was saved, the 2025 season was instead a battle for promotion. Aalesund also eliminated Bodø/Glimt from the 2025 Norwegian Football Cup.
