= Albert Aleksanjan =

Latvian footballer (born 2006)

Personal information
- Date of birth: 10 March 2006 (age 20)
- Place of birth: Latvia
- Height: 1.93 m (6 ft 4 in)
- Position: Winger

Team information
- Current team: Norrköping
- Number: 10

Youth career
- –2021: Frigg
- 2022–2023: Ullern

Senior career*
Years	Team	Apps	(Gls)
2023–2024	Ullern 2	40	(6)
2023	Ullern	3	(0)
2025	Ull/Kisa	23	(10)
2025	→ Ull/Kisa 2	8	(4)
2026–	Norrköping	24	(5)

International career^{‡}
2026–	Latvia U21	2	(0)
2026–	Latvia	3	(0)
- * Club domestic league appearances and goals as of 11 November 2026 ‡ National team caps and goals as of 15 November 2026

Albert Aleksanjan (Latvian: Alberts Aleksanjans; Armenian: Ալբերտ Ալեքսանյան; born 10 March 2006) is a Latvian professional footballer who plays as a winger for Swedish club Norrköping and the Latvia national team.

== Early life ==
Aleksanjan was born on 10 March 2006 in Latvia. Born to an Armenian father and a Latvian mother, he moved with his family to Norway at the age of three.

Growing up, he regarded Argentina international Lionel Messi as his football idol and supported Spanish La Liga side Barcelona.

== Club career ==
As a youth player, Aleksanjan joined the youth academy of Norwegian side Frigg. Following his stint there, he joined the youth academy of Ullern in Norway and was promoted to the club's senior team in 2023, where he made three league appearances.

During the spring of 2025, he signed for Norwegian outfit Ull/Kisa. Ahead of the 2026 season, he signed for Norrköping in Sweden. On 28 February 2026, he scored his first goal for the club during a 2–0 home win over Landskrona in the Svenska Cupen.

== International career ==
Aleksanjan is a Latvia international. On 5 June 2026, he debuted for the Latvia national under-21 football team during a 1–1 home friendly draw with the Estonia national under-21 football team.

On 25 September 2026, he debuted for the Latvia national football team during a 0–2 away loss to the country of his origin, Armenia national football team, in the UEFA Nations League.

== Style of play ==
Aleksanjan plays as a winger and is two-footed. Armenian news website Sportaran wrote in 2025 that he "is known for his speed, technique, and effective play on the wings. His primary position is as a left winger, but he is equally successful on the right wing... impresses not only with his physical strength, but also with his good vision of the field, dribbling and ability to make smart decisions in the final stretch".
