= Simen Hammershaug =

Norwegian footballer (born 2000)

Personal information
- Full name: Simen Hjerkinn Hammershaug
- Date of birth: 2 August 2000 (age 26)
- Height: 1.85 m (6 ft 1 in)
- Position: Striker

Team information
- Current team: Lillehammer

Youth career
- –2016: Lillehammer
- 2016–2018: Strømsgodset

Senior career*
Years	Team	Apps	(Gls)
2019–2021	Strømsgodset	3	(0)
2019	→ Asker (loan)	16	(4)
2022	Egersund	22	(10)
2023–2024	Ullensaker/Kisa	18	(1)
2024–2025	Grorud	30	(8)
2026–	Lillehammer		
- * Club domestic league appearances and goals as of 3 November 2025

Simen Hjerkinn Hammershaug (born 2 August 2000) is a Norwegian footballer who plays a striker for Lillehammer.

A youth product of Lillehammer FK, he transferred to the junior team of Strømsgodset in mid-2016. In 2019 he signed a first-team contract, but was loaned out to Asker for the entire season. He made his Eliteserien debut in November 2020 against Kristiansund. In January 2022, he moved to Egersund on a two-year contract.

On 21 December 2022, Ullensaker/Kisa IL announced the signing of Hammershaug, on a contract until the end of 2024.
