= Jörgen Wålemark =

Swedish footballer and manager (born 1972)

Personal information
- Date of birth: 3 April 1972 (age 54)
- Place of birth: Ljungskile, Sweden
- Height: 1.88 m (6 ft 2 in)
- Position: Forward

Senior career*
Years	Team	Apps	(Gls)
1987–1994	Ljungskile SK		
1994	St Johnstone F.C.		
1995–1996	Ljungskile SK		
1997	Lillestrøm SK		
1998–2000	IF Elfsborg	49	(7)
2000–2001	Enosis Neon Paralimni		
2001–2002	AEL Limassol		
2002	Trelleborgs FF		
2003–2010	Ljungskile SK		

Managerial career
- 2009–2011: Ljungskile SK
- 2011–2012: BK Häcken U19
- 2014–2017: Varbergs BoIS
- 2018: Jönköpings Södra IF
- 2018–2020: Ljungskile SK
- 2022: Raufoss (assistant)
- 2023–2024: Raufoss
- 2025: Stabæk
- 2025: Raufoss
- 2026-: Fredrikstad II
- * Club domestic league appearances and goals

Jörgen Wålemark (born 3 April 1972) is a Swedish football manager and former player.

== Career ==
He helped Ljungskile SK from the lower leagues to the Allsvenskan, only to leave the club for mostly foreign teams. He returned to Ljungskile in 2003, and the club was once again promoted in 2007. He retired 2008 at the end of "allsvenskan". In the summer 2009 he returned to football and Lsk.

In 2022 he was hired as the new assistant manager of Raufoss IL. Ahead of the 2023 season he was promoted to manager. In December 2024, he was appointed head coach of Stabæk.

In October 2025 he was hired as head coach out the season for Raufoss IL. He managed to keep them in the league after being in the relegation zone.

At the end of the season he went to coach Fredrikstad FK II in the Forth Division in Norway.

== Honours ==
Individual

- Norwegian First Division Coach of the Month: September 2024
