= Marius Andresen =

Norwegian footballer (born 1999)

Personal information
- Date of birth: 21 December 1999 (age 26)
- Height: 1.83 m (6 ft 0 in)
- Positions: Right-back; wing-back

Team information
- Current team: Aalesund
- Number: 2

Youth career
- –2013: Frogner
- 2014–2017: Skedsmo

Senior career*
Years	Team	Apps	(Gls)
2017–2018	Skedsmo	33	(0)
2019–2021	Lørenskog	29	(1)
2022–2024	Moss	73	(8)
2025–	Aalesund	40	(1)
- * Club domestic league appearances and goals as of 22 November 2026

Marius Andresen (born 21 December 1999) is a Norwegian footballer who plays as a right-back for Aalesunds FK.

== Career ==
Andresen hails from Frogner i Sørum and played youth football for Frogner IL and Skedsmo FK. He made his senior debut for Skedsmo in the 2017 3. divisjon and continued his career in Lower Romerike at Lørenskog IF. In 2022 he transferred to Moss FK, winning promotion from the 2022 2. divisjon. On his way to becoming a professional footballer without ever having been selected for a district team (kretslag), he was considered one of the best fullbacks if not one of the best players in the 2023 1. divisjon.

Andresen became known for assists from his wing-back position. Andresen also became known for a physical and tough playing style. In late 2025 he was suspended for 4 games as he was found to have punched an opponent.

In the winter transfer window of 2024, Eliteserien club KFUM placed transfer bids on Andresen. In the next winter window, he moved to promotion-chasing Aalesunds FK. Here, Andresen won promotion to the 2026 Eliteserien where he made his first-tier debut. Notably, he also scored in the 2025 Norwegian Football Cup tie where Aalesud eliminated Champions League contenders Bodø/Glimt.

With Aalesund ardently battling relegation from the 2026 Eliteserien, Andresen scored a stoppage time goal that secured one point against Rosenborg with three rounds left of the league.
