= Janus Seehusen =

Danish footballer (born 2003)

Personal information
- Full name: Janus Rex Seehusen
- Date of birth: 7 January 2003 (age 23)
- Place of birth: Køge, Denmark
- Height: 1.72 m (5 ft 8 in)
- Positions: Midfielder; defensive midfielder

Team information
- Current team: Aalesund
- Number: 66

Youth career
- Herfølge
- Brøndby
- Midtjylland
- –2021: Køge

Senior career*
Years	Team	Apps	(Gls)
2021–2024	Køge	67	(2)
2024–	Aalesund	29	(2)
- * Club domestic league appearances and goals as of 25 March 2026

Janus Seehusen (born 7 January 2003) is a Danish footballer who plays as a midfielder for Aalesunds FK.

Born in Køge, he was a part of Brøndby and Midtjylland's academies for some time. His last youth club was HB Køge, where he was drafted into the senior team. He made his Danish 1st Division debut in May 2021 against Viborg. He received a three-year contract in June 2021.

It was further extended in 2023 as he played regularly for Køge. However, the extension was never properly registered, and thus Seehusen was possibly a free agent in the summer of 2024. He left and signed for second-tier club Aalesunds FK in Norway.

Seehusen moved to Ålesund with his girlfriend and dog. Aalesund were poised for relegation, so Seehusen admitted that he took a chance by signing, but the club hired a new manager and signed players. Seehusen played half of the league games as Aalesund pulled out of the relegation zone. The next year, Aalesund won promotion to the 2026 Eliteserien via playoff.
