= Lucas Haren =

Danish footballer (born 1997)

Personal information
- Full name: Lucas Janus Ravn-Haren
- Date of birth: 13 October 1997 (age 29)
- Place of birth: Copenhagen, Denmark
- Height: 1.80 m (5 ft 11 in)
- Position: Winger

Team information
- Current team: Vålerenga
- Number: 77

Youth career
- –2013: HIK
- 2013–2016: Nordsjælland

Senior career*
Years	Team	Apps	(Gls)
2016–2017	HIK	11	(2)
2017–2018	Randers	3	(0)
2018	HIK	16	(7)
2019–2021	Helsingør	42	(2)
2021–2024	Fremad Amager	76	(17)
2024–2025	Kongsvinger	56	(31)
2026–	Vålerenga	23	(11)
- * Club domestic league appearances and goals as of 24 October 2026

Lucas Janus Ravn-Haren (born 13 October 1997) is a Danish footballer who plays as a winger for Eliteserien side Vålerenga.

== Club career ==
=== Youth career ===
Haren is a product of HIK and Nordsjælland. He moved to the latter in 2013. He did not make his debut on the first team as he asked for, and decided not to extend his contract. He wanted to play on senior niveau.

=== HIK ===
In the quest for senior football, Haren moved to the third-tier Danish 2nd Division club HIK in July 2016. A month after putting on a strong performance against Danish Superliga club Randers in a Danish Cup match, Haren went on a trial with Randers i November 2016, which went successfully.

=== Randers ===
On 8 December 2016 it was confirmed, that Haren at the age of 19, had signed a two-year contract with Randers, starting from the new year. Haren made his debut for the club on 15 March 2017. He started on the bench, but replaced Marvin Pourié in the 89th minute in a 1–0 victory against SønderjyskE in the cup. He played his first game in the Superliga on 19 March 2017, where he came on the pitch in the 90th minute, replacing Johnny Thomsen, in a 0–1 defeat against SønderjyskE. Due to the lack of playing time, Haren left the club after terminating his contract by mutual assent on 11 April 2018. He played 7 official games for the club in total.

After leaving the club, Haren trained the rest of the season at his former club HIK.

=== Return to HIK ===
After being released by Randers, Haren returned to HIK.

=== Helsingør ===
On 4 December 2018, Helsingør announced the signing of Haren on a contract until the summer 2021, starting from 1 January 2019. Haren left the club in the summer 2021, where his contract expired.

=== Fremad Amager ===
On 9 July 2021, Haren signed with Fremad Amager.

=== Kongsvinger ===
After a few years at Fremad Amager, Haren went on his first foreign adventure Norwegian First Division side Kongsvinger.

== Private life ==
Lucas Haren is the son of the former footballer Piotr Haren, who played for FC Copenhagen. His grandad is Janusz Andrzej Haren, who represented Widzew Łódź and B93.

He married Merve Ravn-Haren on 14 December 2024.

== Honours ==
Individual

- Norwegian First Division Player of the Month: April 2025, June/July 2025
- Norwegian First Division top scorer: 2025
- Norwegian First Division Player of the Year: 2025
