= Simen Vatne Haram =

Norwegian footballer (born 2005)

Personal information
- Date of birth: 26 January 2005 (age 21)
- Height: 1.88 m (6 ft 2 in)
- Position: Centre-back

Team information
- Current team: Aalesund
- Number: 4

Youth career
- –2020: Ørsta
- 2022: Aalesund

Senior career*
Years	Team	Apps	(Gls)
2021	Ørsta	10	(1)
2022	Volda	18	(2)
2023–	Aalesund	51	(1)

International career^{‡}
2023	Norway U18	7	(0)
2023–2024	Norway U18	20	(0)
2025	Norway U20	4	(0)
2025–	Norway U21	1	(0)
- * Club domestic league appearances and goals as of 23 July 2026 ‡ National team caps and goals as of 20 March 2026

Simen Vatne Haram (born 26 January 2005) is a Norwegian footballer who plays as a center-back for Aalesunds FK.

He started his youth career in Ørsta IL, making his senior debut in the Fifth Division in 2021. In 2022, he moved on to rivals Volda TI, playing in the Third Division before he was bought by Aalesunds FK in September the same year. Starting out as an academy player, he soon made his cup debut in June 2023 against Byåsen and his Eliteserien debut in July against Odd. The transition from the sixth to the first tier in about a year was unusual. He was also called up to his first youth international team, Norway U18.

He was a squad member for the 2023 and 2024 UEFA European Under-19 Championships. In 2025, Haram and two other AaFK players were called up to the 2025 FIFA U-20 World Cup, but Aalesund manager Kjetil Rekdal refused to allow their participation, citing important league matches. Haram's first U21 call up came in 2025 to a match against Spain U21.
