= Ole Martin Nesselquist =

Norwegian football manager (born 1993)

Personal information
- Date of birth: 24 June 1993 (age 33)
- Place of birth: Norway

Managerial career
- Years: Team
- 2013–2015: Trosvik IF
- 2016: Moss FK (assistant)
- 2016–2018: Moss FK
- 2019–2021: Strømmen IF
- 2022: Viking FK (assistant)
- 2023: Knattspyrnufélag Reykjavíkur (assistant)
- 2024–2025: SK Brann 2
- 2025–2026: Moss FK

Ole Martin Nesselquist (born 24 June 1993) is a Norwegian football manager.

== Early life ==
Nesselquist was born on 24 June 1993 in Norway. Growing up, he aspired to become a footballer and a football manager. However, he suffered a calf and ankle fracture which ended his playing career.

== Career ==
Nesselquist started his managerial career with Norwegian side Trosvik IF in 2013, helping the club achieve promotion from fifth tier to the fourth tier. In 2016, he was appointed as an assistant manager of Norwegian side Moss FK, before being promoted to the club's head coach. He steered the team to promotion from the 2017 Third Division.

Subsequently, he was appointed manager of Norwegian side Strømmen IF in 2019. While managing the club, Norwegian newspaper Dagbladet wrote that he was "considered one of Norway's greatest coaching talents". In 2022, he was appointed as an assistant manager of side Viking FK. One year later, ahead of the 2023 season, he was appointed as an assistant manager of Icelandic side Knattspyrnufélag Reykjavíkur. Following his stint there, he was appointed manager of Norwegian side SK Brann 2 in 2024. He returned to Moss in 2025, now playing in the Norwegian First Division.
