= Mustapha Isah =

Nigerian professional footballer

Personal information
- Full name: Mustapha Isah Ubandoma
- Date of birth: 23 July 2004 (age 22)
- Place of birth: Nigeria
- Height: 1.75 m (5 ft 9 in)
- Position: Left winger

Team information
- Current team: RAAL La Louvière
- Number: 11

Youth career
- HB Academy Abuja
- 2022–2024: Randers

Senior career*
Years	Team	Apps	(Gls)
2023–2025	Randers	7	(0)
2024	→ IK Start (loan)	12	(6)
2025–2026	Kristiansund	42	(7)
2026–	RAAL La Louvière	2	(2)
- * Club domestic league appearances and goals as of 16 August 2026

Mustapha Isah Ubandoma (born 23 July 2004) is a Nigerian professional footballer who plays as a left winger for Belgian Pro League side RAAL La Louvière.

== Club career ==
=== Randers FC ===
Following a successful trial, Isah joined Randers FC from HB Academy in Abuja in July 2022. The 18-year old winger signed a three-year deal with Randers.

In his first six months in Randers, Isah mainly played for the U19s, while making the bench for a few Danish Superliga games during the months. He got his official debut for the club in the Danish Cup against Vendsyssel FF on 20 October 2022, playing the last 12 minutes off the bench. In February 2023, Isah went with the first team squad on training camp in Turkey. Later on same month, on 26 February, Isah got his Danish Superliga debut against Lyngby Boldklub.

Ahead of the 2023-24 season, Isah was permanently promoted to the first team squad.

==== Loan at IK Start ====
On 24 July 2024, it was confirmed that Isah had been loaned out to Norwegian First Division club IK Start for the rest of the year with an option to buy. After a good stay with six games and an assist in 12 games, IK Start negotiated with Randers to keep Isah after the end of the loan spell. As the clubs could not agree and the option had expired, Start's sports director confirmed on 12 January 2025 that Isah would return to Randers.

=== Kristiansund BK ===
On 26 January 2025, it was confirmed that Isah would continue in Norway after all, but instead at Eliteserien side Kristiansund BK, where he had signed a deal until the end of 2028.

=== La Louvière ===
In July 2026, Isah joined Belgian Pro League club RAAL La Louvière from Kristiansund on a three-year contract. The transfer was reported to be a record sale for Kristiansund BK.

== Career statistics ==
=== Club ===
As of match played 18 July 2026

Club	Season	League			National Cup (Note: Includes Danish Cup, Norwegian Cup)		Continental		Other		Total	
Club	Season	Division	Apps	Goals	Apps	Goals	Apps	Goals	Apps	Goals	Apps	Goals
Randers	2022-23	Danish Superliga	2	0	1	0	—		—		3	0
Randers	2023-24	Danish Superliga	5	0	2	0	—		0	0	7	0
Randers	2024-25	Danish Superliga	0	0	0	0	—		—		0	0
Randers	Total		7	0	3	0	0	0	0	0	10	0
Start (loan)	2024	Norwegian First Division	12	6	0	0	—		—		12	6
Kristiansund	2025	Eliteserien	29	5	5	3	—		—		34	8
Kristiansund	2026	Eliteserien	13	1	1	0	—		—		14	1
Kristiansund	Total		42	6	6	3	0	0	0	0	48	9
RAAL La Louvière	2026–27	Belgian Pro League	0	0	0	0	—		—		0	0
Career total			60	12	9	3	0	0	0	0	69	15

== Honours ==
Individual

- Norwegian First Division Young Player of the Month: September 2024
