= Erik Flataker =

Norwegian footballer (born 2004)

Personal information
- Full name: Erik Hovden Flataker
- Date of birth: 26 December 2004 (age 21)
- Height: 1.82 m (6 ft 0 in)
- Position: Striker

Team information
- Current team: Go Ahead Eagles
- Number: 29

Youth career
- –2018: Skavøypoll
- 2019: Tornado Måløy
- 2020: Måløy
- 2020–2023: Sogndal

Senior career*
Years	Team	Apps	(Gls)
2019	Tornado Måløy	8	(3)
2021–2023	Sogndal 2	32	(20)
2022–2025	Sogndal	70	(15)
2025–2026	AIK	21	(5)
2026–	Go Ahead Eagles	6	(1)

International career^{‡}
2021	Norway U17	4	(2)
2022	Norway U18	11	(5)
2023	Norway U19	9	(3)
2025–	Norway U21	1	(0)
- * Club domestic league appearances and goals as of 18 October 2026 ‡ National team caps and goals as of 29 October 2025

Erik Hovden Flataker (born 26 December 2004) is a Norwegian footballer who plays as a striker for Eredivisie club Go Ahead Eagles.

== Career ==
He played youth football for Skavøypoll until 2018. In 2019 he joined Tornado Måløy, scoring thrice for their senior team in the 2019 Fourth Division. In 2020, Skavøypoll and Tornado Måløy merged to Måløy; also, senior football below the Second Division was not contested due to the COVID-19 pademic. After one season of youth football in Måløy, he played the next one in Sogndal, before joining the senior squad and making his first-team debut in April 2022 against Stabæk.

Flataker started the 2025 season very well and was declared Young Player of the Month in the First Division. When Flataker refused to prolong his contract with Sogndal, he was unceremoniously sidelined, and a transfer took place in the summer of 2025. AIK bought the player. AIK's assistant manager described Flataker as "a role player who will fill some holes we have" and a player with "more than one X factor". Flataker was therefore ready to start AIK matches right away.

In the initial phase, he became known for his lack of goalscoring, as the entire AIK team struggled with the same thing. His first goal came in the 2025-26 Svenska Cupen against Hudiksvalls FF. He scored his first league goal against IK Sirius in September. He then scored twice against last-placed IFK Värnamo, who won nonetheless.

On 8 July 2026, Flataker signed a four-season contract with Dutch top-tier Eredivisie club Go Ahead Eagles.

== International career ==
From 2021 Flataker was also a Norway youth international. He took part in the 2023 UEFA European Under-19 Championship, scoring once against Greece.

== Career statistics ==
As of 27 October 2026

Appearances and goals by club, season and competition
Club	Season	League			National Cup (Note: Includes Norwegian Cup, Svenska Cupen)		Europe		Total	
Club	Season	Division	Apps	Goals	Apps	Goals	Apps	Goals	Apps	Goals
Tornado Måløy	2019	4. divisjon	8	3	0	0	—		8	3
Sogndal 2	2021	3. divisjon	8	0	—		—		8	0
Sogndal 2	2022	4. divisjon	12	12	—		—		12	12
Sogndal 2	2023	3. divisjon	12	8	—		—		12	8
Sogndal 2	Total		32	20	—		—		32	20
Sogndal	2022	1. divisjon	10	0	3	2	—		13	2
Sogndal	2023	1. divisjon	24	4	2	0	—		26	4
Sogndal	2024	1. divisjon	30	7	3	0	—		33	7
Sogndal	2025	1. divisjon	6	4	3	2	—		9	6
Sogndal	Total		70	15	11	4	—		81	19
AIK	2025	Allsvenskan	14	5	1	2	4 (Note: Appearances in UEFA Conference League)	0	19	7
AIK	2026	Allsvenskan	1	1	4	1	—		5	2
AIK	Total		15	6	5	3	4	0	24	9
Go Ahead Eagles	2026–27	Eredivisie	6	1	1	0	—		7	1
Career total			121	45	17	7	4	0	142	52

== Honours ==
Individual

- Norwegian First Division Young Player of the Month: April 2025
