= Aalesunds FK =

Norwegian association football club

- Full name: Aalesunds Fotballklubb
- Nicknames: Tangotrøyene (Tangoshirts); Tango; De oransje og blå (Orange and blue)
- Short name: AaFK
- Founded: 25 June 1914 (112 years ago)
- Ground: Color Line Stadion; Ålesund
- Capacity: 10,778
- Chairman: Jan Petter Hagen
- Manager: Kjetil Rekdal
- League: Eliteserien
- 2025: 1. divisjon, 4th of 16 (promoted)
- Website: www.aafk.no
Home colours	Away colours

Aalesunds Fotballklubb, commonly known as Aalesund or AaFK, is a Norwegian professional football club from the town of Ålesund that competes in the Eliteserien, the top tier of the Norwegian football league system. The club was founded on 25 June 1914. As of 2004, the football club had 835 members and several teams on both professional and amateur levels. These teams are the 1st and 2nd teams, junior team, and also several age-specific teams.

== History ==
In 2009 the club won the Norwegian Cup for the first time in its history. They beat rival Molde FK in the Final, and thereby qualified for participation in the UEFA Europa League. Aalesund also won the 2011 Cup final, where they beat SK Brann.

=== Recent domestic ===
Season		Pos.	Pl.	W	D	L	GS	GA	P	Cup	Notes
2001	1. divisjon	6	30	13	8	9	65	51	47	Third round	
2002	1. divisjon	↑ 2	30	19	7	4	77	26	64	Semi-final	Promoted to the Tippeligaen
2003	Tippeligaen	↓ 13	26	7	7	12	30	33	28	Quarter-final	Relegated to the 1. divisjon
2004	1. divisjon	↑ 2	30	21	1	8	67	36	64	Third round	Promoted to the Tippeligaen
2005	Tippeligaen	↓ 13	26	6	9	11	30	42	27	Fourth round	Relegated to the 1. divisjon
2006	1. divisjon	↑ 2	30	17	9	4	71	35	60	Fourth round	Promoted to the Tippeligaen
2007	Tippeligaen	11	26	9	3	14	49	56	30	Fourth round	
2008	Tippeligaen	13	26	7	4	15	29	42	25	Fourth round	
2009	Tippeligaen	13	30	9	9	12	34	43	36	Winner	
2010	Tippeligaen	4	30	14	5	11	46	37	47	Third round	Europa League Third qualifying round
2011	Tippeligaen	9	30	12	7	11	36	38	43	Winner	Europa League Play-off round
2012	Tippeligaen	11	30	9	11	10	40	41	38	Fourth round	Europa League Third qualifying round
2013	Tippeligaen	4	30	14	7	9	55	44	49	Third round	
2014	Tippeligaen	7	30	11	8	11	40	39	41	Fourth round	
2015	Tippeligaen	10	30	11	5	14	42	57	38	Third round	
2016	Tippeligaen	9	30	12	6	12	46	51	42	Third round	
2017	Eliteserien	↓ 15	30	8	8	14	38	50	32	Fourth round	Relegated to 1. divisjon
2018	1. divisjon	3	30	18	5	7	58	31	59	First round	
2019	1. divisjon	↑ 1	30	25	4	1	67	25	79	Quarter-final	Promoted to Eliteserien
2020	Eliteserien	↓ 16	30	2	5	23	30	85	11	Cancelled	Relegated to 1. divisjon
2021	1. divisjon	↑ 2	30	16	10	4	68	43	58	Fourth round	Promoted to Eliteserien
2022	Eliteserien	9	30	10	9	11	32	45	39	Third round	
2023	Eliteserien	↓ 16	30	5	3	22	23	73	18	Third round	Relegated to 1. divisjon
2024	1. divisjon	9	30	12	4	14	45	49	40	Second round	
2025	1. divisjon	↑ 4	30	14	10	6	56	35	52	Quarter-final	Promoted to Eliteserien
2026 (in progress)	Eliteserien	15	27	5	10	12	47	62	25	Semi-final	

=== European ===
Season	Competition	Round	Country	Club	Home	Away	Aggregate
2010–11	UEFA Europa League	Q3	(Scotland)	Motherwell	1–1	0–3	1–4
2011–12	UEFA Europa League	Q1	(Wales)	Neath	4–1	2–0	6–1
2011–12	UEFA Europa League	Q2	(Hungary)	Ferencváros	3–1 (aet)	1–2	4–3
2011–12	UEFA Europa League	Q3	(Sweden)	Elfsborg	4–0	1–1	5–1
2011–12	UEFA Europa League	Play-off	(Netherlands)	AZ	2–1	0–6	2–7
2012–13	UEFA Europa League	Q2	(Albania)	Tirana	5–0	1–1	6–1
2012–13	UEFA Europa League	Q3	(Cyprus)	APOEL	0–1	1–2	1–3

== Women's team ==
On 1 January 2026, AaFK Fortuna became part of Aalesunds FK, forming the club's women's team. Under the merger, AaFK Fortuna's assets, rights and obligations were transferred to Aalesunds FK.

== Supporters ==
The local supporter clubs for AaFK are Stormen and Aalesund Support.

=== Rivalries ===
Rival football clubs in the city include Herd, Rollon, Skarbøvik and Spjelkavik, with Molde and Hødd traditionally being the main regional rivals. Hødd has been less competitive with AaFK in recent years, as they have not been in the same division for some time. More recent rivalries have centred on Molde and Strømsgodset, and to some extent Brann.

The club's supporters enjoy a good relationship with supporters of Oslo club Vålerenga, and it is not uncommon for supporters of one club to support the other in competitions where only one team participates. In the 2011 game against Neath in Wales, some supporters of 2010's Europa League opponents Motherwell also made their way to support the club.

== Stadium ==
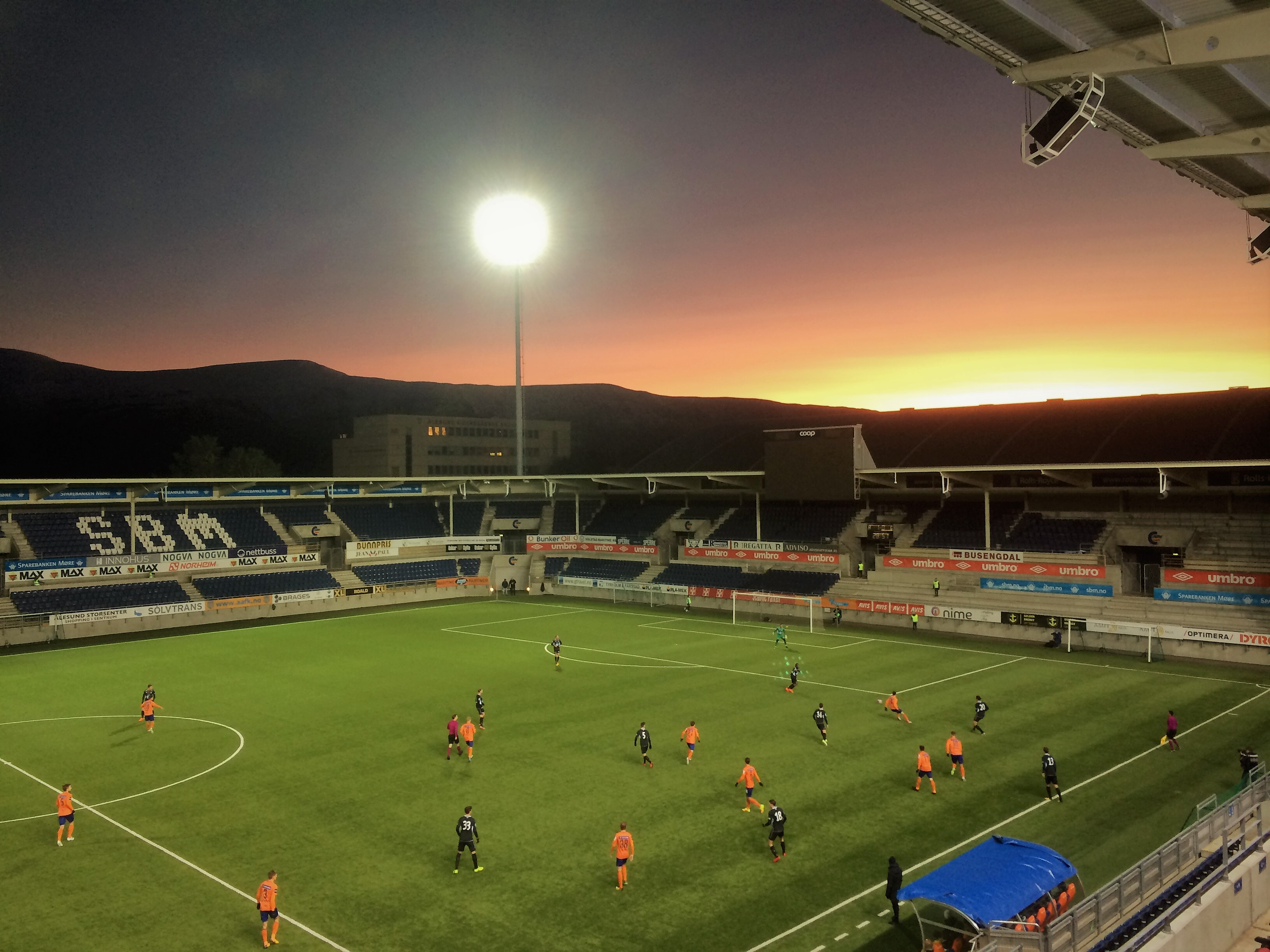
Color Line stadium in January 2018.

Aalesund played their home matches at Kråmyra Stadium until the 2005 season, when they relocated to the new Color Line Stadium with an approximate capacity of 11,000 people. Boosted by the new stadium, recent success and general increasing attendance in Norway, Aalesund has gone from attracting crowds of approximately 1,000 to regularly selling out their stadium in only a few years. Their average attendance of 9,943 in the 2006 1. divisjon became at the time a new record for attendances at the second tier of the Norwegian league system.

== Finances and commercial partnerships ==
The move from Kråmyra Stadium to Color Line Stadion significantly increased the club's commercial income. In 2007, AaFK managing director Henrik Hoff said that sponsorship revenue had quadrupled, ticket revenue had more than doubled and total revenue had more than tripled since the move. The club leased the stadium from Ålesund Stadion KS under an agreement consisting of a fixed payment and 20 per cent of ticket revenue; Hoff said that annual rent could exceed NOK 10 million when the stadium was full. In February 2017, O. N. Sunde AS entered into a three-year agreement to match parts of AaFK's increased income from new and expanded sponsorship agreements and season-ticket sales. ''Aftenposten'' reported that the agreement could provide the club with tens of millions of Norwegian kroner over the period.

== Current squad ==
As of 3 September 2026

Note: Flags indicate national team as defined under FIFA eligibility rules; some limited exceptions apply. Players may hold more than one non-FIFA nationality.

No.	Pos.	Nation	Player
1	GK	GER	Luca Podlech (on loan from Schalke 04)
2	DF	NOR	Marius Andresen
3	DF	ISL	Ólafur Guðmundsson
4	DF	NOR	Simen Vatne Haram
5	DF	NOR	Aleksander Hammer Kjelsen
6	MF	NOR	Håkon Hammer
7	MF	NOR	Kristoffer Nessø
8	MF	NOR	Isak Gabriel Skotheim
9	FW	DEN	Paul Ngongo (captain)
10	MF	DEN	Mathias Kristensen
14	MF	NGR	Uba Charles
15	MF	NOR	Endre Osenbroch
16	DF	NOR	Jakob Nyland Ørsahl
17	FW	NOR	Elias Myrlid
18	MF	NOR	Elias Hagen (on loan from Vålerenga)

No.	Pos.	Nation	Player
19	MF	NOR	Sander Kartum
20	FW	CMR	Ivan Djantou
21	MF	GRL	Mathias Christensen
22	DF	SWE	Emil Engqvist
23	FW	SWE	Stefano Vecchia
25	DF	NOR	Ulrik Syversen
26	GK	NOR	Tor Erik Larsen
27	FW	NOR	Marcus Reed
28	DF	SEN	Cheikh Mbacké Diop (on loan from Brann)
30	FW	NOR	Storm Karlsson Knutsen
38	MF	NOR	Tobias Leikanger
45	DF	NOR	Philip Aukland
66	MF	DEN	Janus Seehusen

For season transfers, see List of Norwegian football transfers winter 2025–26, and List of Norwegian football transfers summer 2026.

=== Out on loan ===
Note: Flags indicate national team as defined under FIFA eligibility rules; some limited exceptions apply. Players may hold more than one non-FIFA nationality.

No.	Pos.	Nation	Player
11	MF	ISL	Davíð Jóhannsson (at Bryne until 31 December 2026)
23	DF	NOR	Erik Frøysa (at Raufoss until 31 December 2026)

No.	Pos.	Nation	Player
29	DF	NOR	Jørgen Bøe (at Træff until 31 December 2026)

== Club officials ==
- Chairman:Gunnar Haagensen
- Head coach: Kjetil Rekdal
- Assistant coach: Geir Frigård
- Goalkeeper coach: Frank Mathiesen
- Reserve team head coach:

== Managers ==
- Bobby Gould
- Egil "Drillo" Olsen (1989)
- Eivind Syversen (19??–93)
- Knut Torbjørn Eggen (1994–96)
- Bård Wiggen (1 July 1997 – 30 June 1999)
- Geir Hansen (2000)
- Ivar Morten Normark (1 January 2002 – 31 December 2005)
- Per Joar Hansen (1 January 2006 – 31 December 2007)
- Sören Åkeby (1 January 2008 – 31 August 2008)
- Kjetil Rekdal (5 September 2008 – 26 November 2012)
- Jan Jönsson (8 January 2013 – 31 December 2014)
- Harald Aabrekk (1 January 2015 – 28 April 2015)
- Trond Fredriksen (28 April 2015 – 12 December 2017)
- Lars Bohinen (20 December 2017 – 23 August 2020)
- Lars Arne Nilsen (25 August 2020 – 4 May 2023)
- Christian Johnsen (13 June 2023 – 18 June 2024)
- Kjetil Rekdal (30 June 2024 –)

== Honours ==
=== League ===
1. divisjon

- Champions (1): 2019

=== Cup ===
Norwegian Cup

- Champions (2): 2009, 2011

== History of league positions (since 1963) ==
	1963	1964–1967	1968–1976	1977–1978	1979	1980–1981	1982–1983	1984	1985–1993	1994	1995–1998	1999–2000	2001–2002	2003	2004	2005	2006	2007–2017	2018–2019	2020	2021	2022–2023	2024–2025	2026–
Level 1																								
Level 2																								
Level 3																								
