= 2023 Molde FK season =

Molde
2023 season
- Chairman: Odd Ivar Moen
- Manager: Erling Moe
- Stadium: Aker Stadion
- Eliteserien: 5th
- 2022 Cup: Quarter-finals
- 2023 Cup: Winners
- UEFA Champions League: Play-off round
- UEFA Europa League: Group stage
- UEFA Europa Conference League: Knockout round play-offs
- Top goalscorer: League: Two Players (7); All: Three Players (12)
- Highest home attendance: 10,730 vs Rosenborg (16 April 2023)
- Lowest home attendance: 2,594 vs Strømsgodset (28 June 2023)
- Average home league attendance: 6,681 (3 December 2023)
Home colours	Away colours

The 2023 season was Molde's 16th consecutive year in Eliteserien, and their 47th season in the top flight of Norwegian football.

== Season events ==
On 28 December 2022, Chelsea announced that David Fofana would join them on 1 January 2023.

On 6 January, Molde announced the signing of Eric Kitolano to a three-year contract from Tromsø.

On 6 January, Martin Ellingsen also confirmed that he had signed with the club for one more year.

On 24 January, Molde announced the signing of Veton Berisha to a four-year contract from Hammarby.

On 25 January, Molde extended their contract with Johan Bakke for an additional season, keeping him at Molde until the end of 2026.

On 31 January, Álex Craninx left Molde.

On 21 February, Molde announced the signing of Anders Hagelskjær from AaB to a four-year contract.

On 22 February, Molde announced the signing of Harun Ibrahim from GAIS to a four-year contract.

On 6 April, Molde extended their contract with Niklas Ødegård until 2025.

On 28 June, Molde extended their contract with manager Erling Moe until the end of 2024.

On 30 June, when his contract expired, Anders Børset left Molde to join the youth ranks of Wolfsburg.

On 7 July, Molde announced the return of Eirik Hestad on a contract until 2027.

On 13 July, Molde announced that Rafik Zekhnini would leave the club to sign permanently for Sarpsborg 08 on 1 August.

On 17 July, Birk Risa left Molde for New York City FC.

On 4 August, Eirik Andersen left the club, signing for his former club Strømsgodset.

On 23 August, Molde announced the signing of Casper Øyvann on a contract until the end of 2026, from Tromsø.

On 31 August, Benjamin Hansen was loaned to AIK for the remainder of the season, whilst Harun Ibrahim joined IK Sirius on a similar deal. Later the same day, Molde announced the return of Fredrik Gulbrandsen who'd last played for Adana Demirspor.

On 1 September, Molde announced the singing of Christian Cappis on loan from Brøndby until the end of the season, whilst Sivert Mannsverk left the club to sign for Ajax and Ola Brynhildsen left to join Midtjylland.

== Squad ==
As of match played 14 December 2023

No.	Name	Nationality	Position	Date of birth (age)	Signed from	Signed in	Contract ends	Apps.	Goals
Goalkeepers
1	Jacob Karlstrøm	(Norway)	GK	9 January 1997 (aged 26)	Tromsø	2022	2025	77	0
12	Oliver Petersen	(Norway)	GK	26 September 2001 (aged 22)	Follo	2019	2024	32	0
34	Peder Hoel Lervik	(Norway)	GK	24 April 2005 (aged 18)	Academy	2021		0	0
Defenders
2	Martin Bjørnbak	(Norway)	DF	22 March 1992 (aged 31)	Bodø/Glimt	2019	2025	143	5
3	Casper Øyvann	(Norway)	DF	7 December 1999 (aged 24)	Tromsø	2023	2026	17	0
4	Christian Cappis	(United States)	DF	13 August 1999 (aged 24)	on loan from Brøndby	2023	2023	4	0
19	Eirik Haugan	(Norway)	DF	27 August 1997 (aged 26)	Östersunds	2022	2026	81	2
21	Martin Linnes	(Norway)	DF	20 September 1991 (aged 32)	Unattached	2021	2025	229	27
25	Anders Hagelskjær	(Denmark)	DF	16 February 1997 (aged 26)	AaB	2023	2026	37	0
28	Kristoffer Haugen	(Norway)	DF	21 February 1994 (aged 29)	Viking	2018	2025	182	20
31	Mathias Løvik	(Norway)	DF	6 December 2003 (aged 20)	Academy	2021	2026	63	3
Midfielders
5	Eirik Hestad	(Norway)	MF	26 June 1995 (aged 28)	Unattached	2023	2027	245	39
6	Martin Ellingsen	(Norway)	MF	2 May 1995 (aged 28)	Kongsvinger	2017	2023	118	19
7	Magnus Wolff Eikrem	(Norway)	MF	8 August 1990 (aged 33)	Seattle Sounders FC	2018	2025	279	65
10	Eric Kitolano	(Norway)	MF	2 September 1997 (aged 26)	Tromsø	2023	2025	39	7
14	Erling Knudtzon	(Norway)	MF	15 December 1988 (aged 34)	Lillestrøm	2019	2023	167	10
15	Markus Kaasa	(Norway)	MF	15 July 1997 (aged 26)	Odd	2022	2025	73	11
16	Emil Breivik	(Norway)	MF	11 June 2000 (aged 23)	Academy	2014	2025	123	15
20	Kristian Eriksen	(Norway)	MF	18 July 1995 (aged 28)	HamKam	2022	2026	71	14
22	Magnus Grødem	(Norway)	MF	14 August 1998 (aged 25)	Sandnes Ulf	2021	2024	113	27
24	Johan Bakke	(Norway)	MF	1 April 2004 (aged 19)	Sogndal	2022	2026	10	0
33	Niklas Ødegård	(Norway)	MF	29 March 2004 (aged 19)	Academy	2021	2025	38	6
Forwards
8	Fredrik Gulbrandsen	(Norway)	FW	10 September 1992 (aged 31)	Unattached	2023		68	28
9	Veton Berisha	(Norway)	FW	13 April 1994 (aged 29)	Hammarby	2023	2026	39	7
Molde II
35	William Fraser	(Norway)	GK	26 January 2002 (aged 21)	Academy	2021		0	0
37	Leon-Robin Juberg-Hovland	(Norway)	MF	9 May 2004 (aged 19)	Academy	2021		3	0
40	Martin Kjørsvik	(Norway)	FW	17 January 2003 (aged 20)	Academy	2021		1	0
41	Sindre Heggstad	(Norway)	DF	6 April 2003 (aged 20)	Academy	2021		0	0
42	Jesper Myklebust	(Norway)	FW	5 June 2003 (aged 20)	Academy	2022		0	0
43	Dino Okanovic	(Norway)	FW	3 August 2003 (aged 20)	Academy	2022		0	0
44	Filip Kristoffersen	(Norway)	DF	9 March 2004 (aged 19)	Academy	2021		0	0
46	Andreas Myklebust	(Norway)	MF	16 July 2005 (aged 18)	Academy	201		4	0
48	Anton Solbakken	(Norway)	MF	26 June 2004 (aged 19)	Academy	2022		0	0
49	Nikolai Ohr	(Norway)	MF	22 November 2004 (aged 19)	Academy	2022		0	0
50	Gustav Nyheim	(Norway)	FW	13 February 2006 (aged 17)	Academy	2021		8	0
51	Magnus Solheim	(Norway)	FW	3 March 2005 (aged 18)	Academy	2022		0	0
52	Fredrik Nyheim	(Norway)	DF	2 April 2005 (aged 18)	Academy	2021		0	0
53	Adrian Viken	(Norway)	DF	14 July 2005 (aged 18)	Academy	2021		0	0
55	Emil Silseth	(Norway)	MF	15 September 2005 (aged 18)	Academy	2022		0	0
59	Albert Tjåland	(Norway)	FW	11 February 2004 (aged 19)	Bryne	2020		1	1
	Vegard Myklebust	(Norway)	MF	2 February 2005 (aged 18)	Academy	2022		0	0
Out on loan
4	Benjamin Hansen	(Denmark)	DF	7 February 1994 (aged 29)	Haugesund	2022	2024	65	1
32	Harun Ibrahim	(Sweden)	MF	26 February 2003 (aged 20)	GAIS	2023	2026	0	0
Players who left club during season
3	Birk Risa	(Norway)	DF	13 February 1998 (aged 25)	Odd	2020	2023	95	3
5	Sheriff Sinyan	(The Gambia)	DF	19 July 1996 (aged 27)	Lillestrøm	2020	2023	62	3
8	Sivert Mannsverk	(Norway)	MF	8 May 2002 (aged 21)	Sogndal	2021	2025	87	8
11	Ola Brynhildsen	(Norway)	FW	27 April 1999 (aged 24)	Stabæk	2020	2024	137	42
12	Álex Craninx	(Belgium)	GK	21 October 1995 (aged 28)	Cartagena	2018	2023	29	0
17	Rafik Zekhnini	(Norway)	FW	12 January 1998 (aged 25)	Fiorentina	2021	2024	41	3
23	Eirik Andersen	(Norway)	MF	21 September 1992 (aged 31)	Strømsgodset	2019	2023	64	21
29	Anders Børset	(Norway)	DF	22 February 2006 (aged 17)	Academy	2021	2023	4	0
47	Nikolai Skuseth	(Norway)	DF	18 May 2004 (aged 19)	Academy	2021		0	0

== Transfers ==
=== In ===
Date	Position	Nationality	Name	From	Fee	Ref.
6 January 2023	MF	(Norway)	Eric Kitolano	Tromsø	Undisclosed	
24 January 2023	FW	(Norway)	Veton Berisha	Hammarby	Undisclosed	
21 February 2023	DF	(Denmark)	Anders Hagelskjær	AaB	Undisclosed	
22 February 2023	MF	(Sweden)	Harun Ibrahim	GAIS	Undisclosed	
7 July 2023	MF	(Norway)	Eirik Hestad	Unattached	Free	
23 August 2023	DF	(Norway)	Casper Øyvann	Tromsø	Undisclosed	
31 August 2023	FW	(Norway)	Fredrik Gulbrandsen	Unattached	Free	

=== Loans in ===
Date from	Position	Nationality	Name	From	Date to	Ref.
1 September 2023	DF	(United States)	Christian Cappis	Brøndby	End of season	

=== Out ===
Date	Position	Nationality	Name	To	Fee	Ref.
1 January 2023	FW	(Ivory Coast)	David Fofana	Chelsea	Undisclosed	
13 July 2023	FW	(Norway)	Rafik Zekhnini	Sarpsborg 08	Undisclosed	
17 July 2023	DF	(Norway)	Birk Risa	New York City FC	Undisclosed	
4 August 2023	MF	(Norway)	Eirik Andersen	Strømsgodset	Undisclosed	
11 August 2023	DF	(Norway)	Nikolai Skuseth	Ranheim	Undisclosed	
1 September 2023	MF	(Norway)	Sivert Mannsverk	AFC Ajax	Undisclosed	
1 September 2023	FW	(Norway)	Ola Brynhildsen	Midtjylland	Undisclosed	

=== Loans out ===
Date from	Position	Nationality	Name	To	Date to	Ref.
31 August 2023	DF	(Denmark)	Benjamin Hansen	AIK	End of season	
31 August 2023	MF	(Sweden)	Harun Ibrahim	IK Sirius	End of season	

=== Released ===
Date	Position	Nationality	Name	Joined	Date	Ref.
31 January 2023	GK	(Belgium)	Álex Craninx	Fuenlabrada	8 February 2023	
30 June 2023	DF	(The Gambia)	Sheriff Sinyan	Slavia Prague	4 July 2023	
30 June 2023	DF	(Norway)	Anders Børset	Wolfsburg U19	1 July 2023	
31 December 2023	MF	(Norway)	Martin Ellingsen	AIK	1 January 2024	
31 December 2023	MF	(Norway)	Erling Knudtzon	Lillestrøm	1 January 2024	

== Friendlies ==
20 January 2023	Viktoria Plzeň	2–0	Molde	La Nucia, Spain
15:00 CET (UTC+1)	Květ (yellow card) 19'; Chorý 42', 53'	Report		Attendance: 80

28 January 2023	Molde	2–1	Træff	Molde
14:00 CET (UTC+1)	Eriksen 68'; Grødem 84'	Report	Haga 46'	Stadium: Aker Stadion

1 February 2023	Molde	8–1	Brattvåg	Molde
14:00 CET (UTC+1)	Løvik 18', 19'; Breivik 21', 43'; Eikrem 33', 34'; Eriksen 46'; Knudtzon 48'	Report	Leine 36'	Stadium: Aker Stadion

7 February 2023	Molde	v	BK Hacken	Marbella, Spain
16:00 CET (UTC+1)
Note: Match cancelled due to heavy rain.

9 February 2023	Molde	3–4	Odd	Marbella, Spain
16:00 CET (UTC+1)	Breivik 20'; Løvik 22'; Zekhnini 89'	Report	Jevtović 42'; Midtskogen 50'; Jørgensen 55'; Diabagate 82'

14 February 2023	Molde	1–1	Jeonbuk Hyundai Motors	Marbella, Spain
15:00 CET (UTC+1)	Brynhildsen 62'	Report	Moon S-m 22' (pen.)

24 February 2023	Molde	2–1	Sandefjord	Molde
15:00 CET (UTC+1)	Brynhildsen 5'; Eikrem 28'	Report	Dunsby 84'	Stadium: Aker Stadion

4 March 2023	Kristiansund	0–4	Molde	Kristiansund
14:00 CET (UTC+1)		Report	Hansen 12'; Eriksen 33', 46'; Risa 58'	Stadium: Kristiansund Stadion

21 March 2023	Molde	0–1	Hødd	Molde
15:00 CET (UTC+1)		Report	Bonde 66'	Stadium: Aker Stadion

25 March 2023	Aalesund	0–3	Molde	Ålesund
14:00 CET (UTC+1)	Munksgaard (yellow card) 90+1'	Report	Eikrem 10', 43'; (yellow card) 45+1'; Linnes (yellow card) 57'; Kitolano 75'	Stadium: Color Line Stadion

2 April 2023	Molde	2–3	Bodø/Glimt	Molde
14:00 CEST (UTC+2)	Haugen 7'; Brynhildsen 30'	Report	Moumbagna 35'; Sørli 42'; Grønbæk 80'	Stadium: Aker Stadion

== Competitions ==
=== Overview ===
Competition	First match	Last match	Starting round	Final position	Record							
Competition	First match	Last match	Starting round	Final position	Pld	W	D	L	GF	GA	GD	Win %
Eliteserien	10 April 2023	3 December 2023	Matchday 1	5th	30	15	6	9	65	38	+27	50.00
2022 Norwegian Cup	12 March 2023	18 March 2023	Fourth round	Quarterfinal	2	1	1	0	4	2	+2	50.00
2023 Norwegian Cup	24 May 2023	10 December 2023	First round	Winners	7	7	0	0	19	1	+18	100.00
UEFA Champions League	25 July 2023	29 August 2023	Second qualifying round	Playoff round	6	2	0	4	8	8	+0	33.33
UEFA Europa League	21 September 2023	14 December 2023	Group stage	Group Stage	6	2	1	3	12	12	+0	33.33
Total					51	27	8	16	108	61	+47	52.94

Last updated: 14 December 2023
Source: Competitions

=== Eliteserien ===
==== Results summary ====
Overall								Home						Away					
Pld	W	D	L	GF	GA	GD	Pts	W	D	L	GF	GA	GD	W	D	L	GF	GA	GD
30	15	6	9	65	39	+26	51	9	3	3	37	16	+21	6	3	6	28	23	+5

Last updated: 3 December 2023.
Source: see below

==== Results by match ====
Match	1	2	3	4	5	6	7	8	9	10	11	12	13	14	15	16	17	18	19	20	21	22	23	24	25	26	27	28	29	30
Ground	A	H	A	H	H (Note: matchday 17)	A (Note: matchday 5)	H (Note: matchday 6)	A (Note: matchday 7)	H (Note: matchday 8)	A (Note: matchday 9)	A (Note: matchday 10)	H (Note: matchday 11)	A (Note: matchday 12)	H (Note: matchday 13)	A (Note: matchday 14)	H (Note: matchday 15)	A (Note: matchday 16)	A	H	A (Note: matchday 21)	H (Note: matchday 22)	A (Note: matchday 23)	H (Note: matchday 20)	H	A	H	A	H	A	H
Result	L	D	L	L	W	W	W	L	W	W	L	W	D	W	W	W	W	D	D	W	W	D	W	L	L	L	L	W	W	D
Position	12	12	15	15	12	8	7	8	7	4	6	5	5	5	5	4	4	4	4	4	4	5	5	5	5	5	5	5	5	5

Updated to match(es) played on 3 December 2023. Source: see below
A = Away; H = Home; W = Win; D = Draw; L = Loss

==== Results ====
10 April 2023 1	Tromsø	1–0	Molde	Tromsø
17:00 CEST (UTC+2)	Nilsen (yellow card) 42'; Opsahl (penalty missed) 51'; Erlien 54' (yellow card) 90+3'	Report	Risa (yellow card) 81'	Stadium: Alfheim Stadion; Attendance: 3,723; Referee: Mohammad Usman Aslam

16 April 2023 2	Molde	1–1	Rosenborg	Molde
17:00 CEST (UTC+2)	Hansen 18'; Haugan (yellow card) 41'; Kaasa (yellow card) 81'; Mannsverk (yellow card) 88'	Report	Haugen 34' (o.g.); Pereira (yellow card) 85'; Reitan (yellow card) 89'; Cornic (yellow card) 90+2'	Stadium: Aker Stadion; Attendance: 10,730; Referee: Tore Hansen

23 April 2023 3	Lillestrøm	2–1	Molde	Lillestrøm
19:15 CEST (UTC+2)	Tønnessen 5'; Adams 37'; Ranger (yellow card) 90+1'	Report	Breivik 35'; Eikrem (red card) 42'	Stadium: Åråsen Stadion; Attendance: 5,955; Referee: Ola Hobber Nilsen

30 April 2023 4	Molde	2–3	Stabæk	Molde
17:00 CEST (UTC+2)	Grødem 2'; Breivik 55'	Report	Høgh 16'; Hansen 23' (o.g.); Geelmuyden (yellow card) 31'; Kabran 90+5'	Stadium: Aker Stadion; Attendance: 6,054; Referee: Sigurd Smehus Kringstad

3 May 2023 17	Molde	3–0	Aalesund	Molde
18:00 CEST (UTC+2)	Breivik (yellow card) 37'; Bjørnbak (yellow card) 49'; Linnes 58'; Grødem 69'; Mannsverk 90+1' (pen.)	Report	Andersen (yellow card) 33'; Kolskogen (yellow card) 90+2'	Stadium: Aker Stadion; Attendance: 6,135; Referee: Rohit Saggi
Note: Match brought forward to facilitate Molde's UEFA Champions League qualifiers.

7 May 2023 5	HamKam	0–4	Molde	Hamar
17:00 CEST (UTC+2)	Kirkevold (yellow card) 48'; Sjølstad (red card) 60'	Report	Bjarnason 7' (o.g.); Eikrem 53'; Eriksen 56'; Mannsverk 61' (pen.)	Stadium: Briskeby Stadion; Attendance: 4,518; Referee: Marius Lien

13 May 2023 6	Molde	3–2	Strømsgodset	Molde
17:00 CEST (UTC+2)	Linnes 37'; Mannsverk 67'; Breivik 77'	Report	Gulliksen (yellow card) 40'; Mehnert 61'; Brunes 90+6'	Stadium: Aker Stadion; Attendance: 6,423; Referee: Daniel Higraff

16 May 2023 7	Aalesund	3–1	Molde	Ålesund
18:00 CEST (UTC+2)	Ebiye 41' (pen.); Diop (yellow card) 42'; Andersen (yellow card) 50'; Atanga 57', 61'; J.Kitolano (yellow card) 65'; Fällman (yellow card) 90+3'	Report	Mannsverk (penalty missed) 44'; Brynhildsen (yellow card) 55'; Ødegård 90+1'; Berisha (yellow card) 90+3'	Stadium: Color Line Stadion; Attendance: 9,050; Referee: Sivert Amland

29 May 2023 8	Molde	5–0	Sandefjord	Molde
17:00 CEST (UTC+2)	Breivik 18'; Linnes 27'; Grødem 49'; Brynhildsen 56', 66'	Report	Bikoro (yellow card) 33'; Foss (yellow card) 38'; Smeulers (yellow card) 51'	Stadium: Aker Stadion; Attendance: 5,617; Referee: Marius Lien

4 June 2023 9	Viking	3–4	Molde	Stavanger
19:15 CEST (UTC+2)	Stensness 6' (yellow card) 37'; Brekalo (yellow card) 45+2'; Bjørshol 47' (red card) 81'; Tripić 50' de Lanlay (yellow card) 88'	Report	Breivik 2'; Brynhildsen (yellow card) 12' (goal) 28', 90+3'; Grødem 75'	Stadium: Viking Stadion; Attendance: 9,649; Referee: Ola Hobber Nilsen

11 June 2023 10	Odd	1–0	Molde	Skien
17:00 CEST (UTC+2)	Johansen (yellow card) 29'; Midtskogen (yellow card) 33' (goal) 78'; L. Owusu (yellow card) 50'; Wahlstedt (yellow card) 90+3'	Report	Hagelskjær (yellow card) 48'; Eikrem (yellow card) 90'; Linnes (yellow card) 90+2'; Hansen (yellow card) 90+3'	Stadium: Skagerak Arena; Attendance: 4,489; Referee: Tore Hansen

25 June 2023 11	Molde	1–0	Haugesund	Molde
17:00 CEST (UTC+2)	Brynhildsen 39' (yellow card) 87'; Bjørnbak (yellow card) 93'; Karlstrøm (yellow card) 96'	Report	Leite (yellow card) 45'; Eskesen (yellow card) 85'; Diarra (red card) 90+2'	Stadium: Aker Stadion; Attendance: 6,125; Referee: Sivert Amland

2 July 2023 12	Bodø/Glimt	2–2	Molde	Bodø
19:15 CEST (UTC+2)	Moumbagna 66'; Saltnes 90+3' (yellow card) 90+5'	Report	Brynhildsen (yellow card) 7' (goal) 24', 35'; Karlstrøm (red card) 17'; Petersen (yellow card) 41'; Risa (yellow card) 42'; Mannsverk (yellow card) 45+3'; Hansen (yellow card) 46'; Haugan (yellow card) 60'	Stadium: Aspmyra Stadion; Attendance: 7,409; Referee: Kristoffer Hagenes

9 July 2023 13	Molde	2–0	Brann	Molde
19:15 CEST (UTC+2)	Eriksen 12'; Breivik (yellow card) 58'; Kitolano (yellow card) 62'; Berisha 90+5'	Report		Stadium: Aker Stadion; Attendance: 7,604; Referee: Rohit Saggi

15 July 2023 14	Vålerenga	0–4	Molde	Oslo
18:00 CEST (UTC+2)	Hedenstad (yellow card) 90+3'	Report	Kitolano 1'; Haugen 41'; Eriksen 45'; Breivik 55' (pen.) (yellow card) 64'	Stadium: Intility Arena; Attendance: 8,779; Referee: Daniel Higraff

22 July 2023 15	Molde	5–1	Sarpsborg 08	Molde
18:00 CEST (UTC+2)	Kitolano 6', 17', 69'; Mannsverk (yellow card) 62'; Løvik 80'; Linnes 86'	Report	Lundqvist (yellow card) 42'; Andersen (yellow card) 46'; Reinhardsen (yellow card) 50'; Opseth (red card) 63'; Wichne (yellow card) 85'	Stadium: Aker Stadion; Attendance: 8,335; Referee: Tore Hansen

29 July 2023 16	Stabæk	0–1	Molde	Bærum
18:00 CEST (UTC+2)		Report	Berisha 62' (pen.); Hagelskjær (yellow card) 90+6'	Stadium: Nadderud Stadion; Attendance: 3,235; Referee: Svein Oddvar Moen

12 August 2023 18	Sandefjord	2–2	Molde	Sandefjord
16:00 CEST (UTC+2)	Nilsson 39' (pen.); Smeulers (yellow card) 72'; Tveter 90+4'	Report	Hansen (yellow card) 45+2'; Grødem 51'; Bjørnbak (yellow card) 75'; Linnes 85'	Stadium: Sandefjord Arena; Attendance: 4,754; Referee: Kristoffer Hagenes

19 August 2023 19	Molde	0–0	Vålerenga	Molde
18:00 CEST (UTC+2)	Haugan (yellow card) 39' (yellow-red card) 90+7'; Løvik (yellow card) 63'	Report	Børven (yellow card) 74'; Storevik (yellow card) 87'	Stadium: Aker Stadion; Attendance: 6,468; Referee: Svein Tore Sinnes

3 September 2023 21	Haugesund	1–2	Molde	Haugesund
17:00 CEST (UTC+2)	Therkildsen (yellow card) 23' (yellow-red card) 90'; Bærtelsen (yellow card) 83'	Report	Berisha 7'; Eriksen (yellow card) 25'; Eikrem 70'; Grødem (yellow card) 90'	Stadium: Haugesund Stadion; Attendance: 3,416; Referee: Kai Erik Steen

16 September 2023 22	Molde	4–1	Odd	Molde
18:00 CEST (UTC+2)	Hestad 30', 43'; Gulbrandsen 70'; Eikrem 79'	Report	Svendsen 38' (yellow card) 83'	Stadium: Aker Stadion; Attendance: 6,118; Referee: Tore Hansen

24 September 2023 23	Strømsgodset	1–1	Molde	Drammen
17:00 CEST (UTC+2)	Melkersen 8'; Krasniqi (yellow card) 83'; Stengel (yellow card) 90+4'	Report	Eikrem 39'; Løvik (yellow card) 90+4'	Stadium: Marienlyst Stadion; Attendance: 4,737; Referee: Marius Lien

1 October 2023 20	Molde	4–0	Viking	Molde
17:00 CEST (UTC+2)	Eikrem 10', 63'; Eriksen 21'; Hagelskjær (yellow card) 44'; Løvik (yellow card) 53'; Haugen 59'	Report	Tripić (yellow card) 46'; Yazbek (yellow card) 51'	Stadium: Aker Stadion; Attendance: 6,729; Referee: Kristoffer Hagenes
Note: Match originally scheduled for 26 August 2023, but postponed due to Molde's participation in the UEFA Champions League qualifying stages.

8 October 2023 24	Molde	1–3	Bodø/Glimt	Molde
17:00 CEST (UTC+2)	Grødem 30'; Ellingsen (yellow card) 35'; Kaasa (yellow card) 38'; Breivik (penalty missed) 55'; Haugen (yellow card) 78'; Eriksen (yellow card) 87'	Report	Saltnes 26'; Breivik 43' (o.g.); Gulliksen 48'; Grønbæk (penalty missed) 76'; Berg (yellow card) 77'; Moe (yellow card) 78'; Moumbagna (penalty missed) 84'	Stadium: Aker Stadion; Attendance: 7,407; Referee: Sivert Amland

21 October 2023 25	Brann	3–2	Molde	Bergen
18:00 CEST (UTC+2)	Nilsen 13'; Kartum (yellow card) 22' (goal) 49', 78'; Børsting 71'; Heggebø (yellow card) 89'	Report	Gulbrandsen 5' (yellow card) 16'; Øyvann (yellow card) 38'; Petersen (yellow card) 71'; Grødem (yellow card) 81'; Ellingsen 90+5' (pen.)	Stadium: Brann Stadion; Attendance: 16,512; Referee: Ola Hobber Nilsen

30 October 2023 26	Molde	1–4	Tromsø	Molde
21:00 CET (UTC+1)	Haugen 84'; Eikrem (yellow card) 88'	Report	Gundersen (yellow card) 19'; S.Opsahl (yellow card) 27'; Diouf 33'; Traoré 56'; Nordås 75', 78'	Stadium: Aker Stadion; Attendance: 5,597; Referee: Svein Oddvar Moen

5 November 2023 27	Rosenborg	3–1	Molde	Trondheim
17:00 CET (UTC+1)	Þorvaldsson 19' (yellow card) 84'; Røsten (yellow card) 28'; Pereira (yellow card) 40'; Sæter (red card) 45'; Nypan 80'; Frederiksen 90+5'	Report	Breivik 24' (yellow card) 71'; Gulbrandsen (yellow card) 35'; Haugan (yellow card) 40'; Løvik (yellow card) 44' (yellow-red card) 45+1'	Stadium: Lerkendal Stadion; Attendance: 16,723; Referee: Rohit Saggi

12 November 2023 28	Molde	4–0	Lillestrøm	Molde
19:15 CET (UTC+1)	Gabrielsen 4' (o.g.); Berisha 11', 23'; Hestad 88'	Report	Skogvold (yellow card) 56'	Stadium: Aker Stadion; Attendance: 5,440; Referee: Tore Hansen

26 November 2023 29	Sarpsborg 08	1–3	Molde	Sarpsborg
17:00 CET (UTC+1)	Ngouali (yellow card) 42'; Andersen (yellow card) 46'; Uchenna (yellow card) 76'; Torp (yellow card) 77'; Sandberg 90'	Report	Løvik 1'; Haugen 44'; Ødegård 50'; Eriksen (yellow card) 88'	Stadium: Sarpsborg Stadion; Attendance: 3,574; Referee: Mohammad Usman Aslam

3 December 2023 30	Molde	1–1	HamKam	Molde
17:00 CET (UTC+1)	Grødem 90+2' (pen.)	Report	Jónsson 28'; Opsahl (yellow card) 90+3'	Stadium: Aker Stadion; Attendance: 5,431; Referee: Jan Morten Tennøy

==== Table ====
Pos	Team	Pld	W	D	L	GF	GA	GD	Pts	Qualification or relegation
3	Tromsø	30	19	4	7	48	33	+15	61	Qualification for the Conference League second qualifying round
4	Viking	30	18	4	8	61	48	+13	58	
5	Molde	30	15	6	9	65	39	+26	51	Qualification for the Europa League second qualifying round (Note: Molde qualified for the Europa League second qualifying round by winning the 2023 Norwegian Football Cup.)
6	Lillestrøm	30	13	4	13	49	49	0	43	
7	Strømsgodset	30	13	3	14	37	35	+2	42	

Source: Football Association of Norway (in Norwegian)
Rules for classification: 1) Points; 2) Goal difference; 3) Goals scored; 4) Head-to-head points; 5) Head-to-head goal difference; 6) Head-to-head goals scored.

=== Norwegian Cup ===
==== 2022 ====
12 March 2023 Fourth round	Skeid	1–3	Molde	Oslo
15:00 CEST (UTC+2)	Melchior 19'	Report	Brynhildsen 20'; Eriksen 64'; Mannsverk (yellow card) 78'; Eikrem 80'	Stadium: Nordre Åsen; Attendance: 732; Referee: Svein Tore Sinnes

18 March 2023 Quarterfinal	Stabæk	1–1 (9–8 p)	Molde	Bærum
13:30 CEST (UTC+2)	Andresen (yellow card) 48'; Høgh 84'; Bakenga (yellow card) 90'	Report	Berisha 30' (pen.); Karlstrøm (yellow card) 80'; Knudtzon (yellow card) 91'; Haugan (yellow card) 101'	Stadium: AJ Arena; Attendance: 900; Referee: Tore Hansen
	Penalties
	Geelmuyden (penalty missed); Bakenga (penalty scored); Haugen (penalty scored); Krogstad (penalty missed); Næss (penalty scored); Pettersson (penalty scored); Pedersen (penalty scored); Skovgaard (penalty scored); Edwards (penalty scored); Jenssen (penalty missed); Riise (penalty scored); Bakenga (penalty scored)		(penalty scored) Risa; (penalty missed) Brynhildsen; (penalty scored) Grødem; (penalty scored) Breivik; (penalty missed) Hansen; (penalty scored) Haugan; (penalty scored) Hagelskjær; (penalty scored) Linnes; (penalty scored) Karlstrøm; (penalty missed) Erling; (penalty scored) Ødegård; (penalty missed) Grødem

==== 2023 ====
24 May 2023 First round	Surnadal	0–4	Molde	Surnadalsøra
18:00 CEST (UTC+2)		Report	Haugen 9'; Eriksen 35'; Zekhnini (penalty missed) 38'; Ødegård 43'; Berisha 66'	Stadium: Syltøran Stadion; Attendance: 696; Referee: Bendik Haarberg

1 June 2023 Second round	Melhus	0–6	Molde	Melhus
18:00 CEST (UTC+2)	Andreassen (yellow card) 59'; Nilsen (yellow card) 87'	Report	Ødegård 49'; Grødem 59', 71', 81', 90'; Hansen (yellow card) 86'; Breivik 88'	Stadium: Gruva Arena; Referee: Mathias Støfringshaug

7 June 2023 Third round	Kristiansund	0–1	Molde	Kristiansund
19:00 CEST (UTC+2)	Kartum (yellow card) 27'; Ceïde (yellow card) 42'; Willumsson (yellow card) 78'	Report	Mannsverk (yellow card) 61'; Eriksen 66'; Hansen (yellow card) 78'; Petersen (yellow card) 90+1'	Stadium: Kristiansund Stadion; Attendance: 3,407; Referee: Jan Morten Tennøy

28 June 2023 Fourth round	Molde	3–0	Strømsgodset	Molde
18:00 CEST (UTC+2)	Brynhildsen 1'; Kitolano 5'; Breivik 26' (pen.)	Report	Stengel (yellow card) 67'	Stadium: Aker Stadion; Attendance: 2,594; Referee: Svein Oddvar Moen

12 July 2023 Quarterfinal	Molde	3–1	Sarpsborg 08	Molde
18:00 CEST (UTC+2)	Kitolano 1'; Breivik 5'; Hagelskjær (yellow card) 21'; Brynhildsen 35'	Report	Andersen (yellow card) 20'; Lundqvist 73'; Reinhardsen (yellow card) 79'; Torp (yellow card) 81'	Stadium: Aker Stadion; Attendance: 3,752; Referee: Ola Hobber Nilsen

27 September 2023 Semifinal	Kjelsås	0–1	Molde	Oslo
16:00 CEST (UTC+2)	Olafsen (yellow card) 90+3'	Report	Grødem 5' (yellow card) 57'; Haugan (yellow card) 43'; Hagelskjær (yellow card) 55'; Løvik (yellow card) 77'	Stadium: Grefsen Stadion; Attendance: 3,317; Referee: Rohit Saggi

===== Final =====
10 December 2023	Bodø/Glimt	0–1	Molde	Oslo
16:00 CET (UTC+1)	Wembangomo (yellow card) 29'; Moumbagna (yellow card) 90+2'	Report	Eriksen (yellow card) 27'; Gulbrandsen 89'; Berisha (yellow card) 90+8'	Stadium: Ullevaal Stadion; Attendance: 19,178; Referee: Kristoffer Hagenes

=== UEFA Champions League ===
==== Qualifying rounds ====
25 July 2023 Second qualifying round 1st leg	HJK (Finland)	1–0	(Norway) Molde	Helsinki, Finland
18:00 CEST (UTC+2)	Keskinen 25'	Report	Brynhildsen (yellow card) 50'; Haugen (yellow card) 67'	Stadium: Bolt Arena; Attendance: 8,154; Referee: Sven Jablonski (Germany)

2 August 2023 Second qualifying round 2nd leg	Molde (Norway)	2–0 (2–1 agg.)	(Finland) HJK	Molde, Norway
19:00 CEST (UTC+2)	Hagelskjær (yellow card) 64'; Öst 74' (o.g.); Brynhildsen 89'	Report	Tanaka (yellow card) 26'	Stadium: Aker Stadion; Attendance: 5,205; Referee: Igor Pajač (Croatia)

8 August 2023 Third qualifying round 1st leg	KÍ (Faroe Islands)	2–1	(Norway) Molde	Tórshavn, Faroe Islands
20:45 CEST (UTC+2)	J.Andreasen (yellow card) 37'; Frederiksberg 64', 86'; Joensen (yellow card) 90+4'	Report	Eikrem 49'; Linnes (yellow card) 53'; Mannsverk (yellow card) 63'	Stadium: Tórsvøllur; Attendance: 4,584; Referee: Aliyar Aghayev (Azerbaijan)
Note: Matched played at the Tórsvøllur in Tórshavn, instead of KÍ's regular stadium, Við Djúpumýrar, in Klaksvík, which did not meet UEFA requirements.

15 August 2023 Third qualifying round 2nd leg	Molde (Norway)	2–0 (a.e.t.) (3–2 agg.)	(Faroe Islands) KÍ	Molde, Norway
19:00 CEST (UTC+2)	Eriksen 17' (yellow card) 86'; Knudtzon (yellow card) 101'; Haugan (yellow card) 107'; Linnes 112'	Report	Kassi (yellow card) 64'; Vatnsdal (yellow card) 103'; Forren (yellow card) 115'	Stadium: Aker Stadion; Attendance: 10,346; Referee: Nikola Dabanović (Montenegro)

23 August 2023 Playoff round 1st leg	Molde (Norway)	2–3	(Turkey) Galatasaray	Molde, Norway
21:00 CEST (UTC+2)	Ellingsen 8'; Mannsverk (yellow card) 39'; Haugen 56'; Haugan (yellow card) 80'; Breivik (yellow card) 86'	Report	Oliveira 25'; Icardi 29'; Angeliño (yellow card) 85'; Midtsjø 90+3'	Stadium: Aker Stadion; Attendance: 9,553; Referee: Anthony Taylor (England)

29 August 2023 Playoff round 2nd leg	Galatasaray (Turkey)	2–1 (5–3 agg.)	(Norway) Molde	Istanbul, Turkey
21:00 CEST (UTC+2)	Icardi 7' (pen.); Bardakcı (yellow card) 45+5'; Yılmaz (yellow card) 74'; Angeliño 90+3'	Report	Ellingsen (yellow card) 5'; Hestad 66'; Mannsverk (yellow card) 85'; Berisha (yellow card) 90+7'	Stadium: Rams Park; Attendance: 47,845; Referee: Szymon Marciniak (Poland)

=== UEFA Europa League ===
==== Group stage ====
Pos	Team	Pld	W	D	L	GF	GA	GD	Pts	Qualification
1	(Germany) Bayer Leverkusen	6	6	0	0	19	3	+16	18	Advance to round of 16
2	(Azerbaijan) Qarabağ	6	3	1	2	7	9	−2	10	Advance to knockout round play-offs
3	(Norway) Molde	6	2	1	3	12	12	0	7	Transfer to Europa Conference League
4	(Sweden) BK Häcken	6	0	0	6	3	17	−14	0	

Source: UEFA
Rules for classification: Group stage tiebreakers

21 September 2023 1	Qarabağ (Azerbaijan)	1–0	(Norway) Molde	Baku, Azerbaijan
18:45 CEST (UTC+2)	L.Andrade 56'; Janković (yellow card) 84'; Medina (yellow card) 87'; Romão (yellow card) 90+1'	Report	Breivik (yellow card) 20'; Ellingsen (yellow card) 34'; Kaasa (yellow card) 47'; Eriksen (yellow card) 90+7'	Stadium: Tofiq Bahramov Republican Stadium; Attendance: 26,500; Referee: John Beaton (Scotland)

5 October 2023 2	Molde (Norway)	1–2	(Germany) Bayer Leverkusen	Molde, Norway
21:00 CEST (UTC+2)	Eriksen (yellow card) 42'; Løvik (yellow card) 67'; Breivik 87'	Report	Frimpong 14'; Tella 18'	Stadium: Aker Stadion; Attendance: 8,190; Referee: Anastasios Papapetrou (Greece)

26 October 2023 3	Molde (Norway)	5–1	(Sweden) BK Häcken	Molde, Norway
18:45 CEST (UTC+2)	Gulbrandsen 6'; Eikrem 27', 55' (yellow card) 45+2'; Breivik 30'; Bjørnbak 90+3'	Report	Sonko 21'	Stadium: Aker Stadion; Attendance: 5,870; Referee: Urs Schnyder (Switzerland)

9 November 2023 4	BK Häcken (Sweden)	1–3	(Norway) Molde	Gothenburg, Sweden
21:00 CET (UTC+1)	Romeo (yellow card) 51'; Hrstić 65'; Sa.Gustafson (yellow card) 90+3'	Report	Gulbrandsen 16'; Eriksen 24', 86'	Stadium: Ullevi; Attendance: 5,106; Referee: Don Robertson (Scotland)

30 November 2023 5	Molde (Norway)	2–2	(Azerbaijan) Qarabağ	Molde, Norway
21:00 CET (UTC+1)	Grødem (yellow card) 36'; Løvik (yellow card) 43'; Eikrem (yellow card) 61'; Eriksen 82', 87'	Report	Juninho 12'; P.Andrade (yellow card) 66'; Medina (yellow card) 76'; Mustafazadə 90+5'; Xhixha (yellow card) 90+7'	Stadium: Aker Stadion; Attendance: 5,291; Referee: Erik Lambrechts (Belgium)

14 December 2023 6	Bayer Leverkusen (Germany)	5–1	(Norway) Molde	Leverkusen, Germany
18:45 CET (UTC+1)	Schick 6'; Tapsoba 22'; Ellingsen 25' (o.g.); Tah (yellow card) 42'; Hložek 60', 70'; Grimaldo (yellow card) 78'	Report	Kitolano 75'	Stadium: BayArena; Attendance: 28,504; Referee: Robert Jones (England)

== Squad statistics ==
As of match played 14 December 2023

=== Appearances and goals ===
No.	Pos	Nat	Player	Total		Eliteserien		2022–23 Cup		2023 Cup		UEFA Champions League		UEFA Europa League	
No.	Pos	Nat	Player	Apps	Goals	Apps	Goals	Apps	Goals	Apps	Goals	Apps	Goals	Apps	Goals
1	GK	(Norway) NOR	Jacob Karlstrøm	35	0	22	0	2	0	3	0	6	0	2	0
2	DF	(Norway) NOR	Martin Bjørnbak	32	1	17+2	0	0	0	3+1	0	6	0	2+1	1
3	DF	(Norway) NOR	Casper Øyvann	17	0	10	0	0	0	2	0	0	0	5	0
4	DF	(United States) USA	Christian Cappis	4	0	0+2	0	0	0	0	0	0	0	0+2	0
5	MF	(Norway) NOR	Eirik Hestad	17	4	4+7	3	0	0	0+1	0	0+1	1	1+3	0
6	MF	(Norway) NOR	Martin Ellingsen	24	2	9+2	1	0	0	1+1	0	3+2	1	6	0
7	MF	(Norway) NOR	Magnus Wolff Eikrem	36	10	10+10	6	2	1	1+2	0	5+1	1	5	2
8	FW	(Norway) NOR	Fredrik Gulbrandsen	13	5	4+3	2	0	0	1	1	0	0	3+2	2
9	FW	(Norway) NOR	Veton Berisha	39	7	14+8	5	1+1	1	1+5	1	0+5	0	2+2	0
10	MF	(Norway) NOR	Eric Kitolano	39	7	14+9	4	1+1	0	5	2	1+3	0	1+4	1
12	GK	(Norway) NOR	Oliver Petersen	18	0	8+1	0	0	0	4	0	0	0	4+1	0
14	MF	(Norway) NOR	Erling Knudtzon	23	0	7+8	0	1+1	0	1+2	0	2+1	0	0	0
15	MF	(Norway) NOR	Markus Kaasa	33	0	9+9	0	0	0	2+2	0	2+4	0	5	0
16	MF	(Norway) NOR	Emil Breivik	48	12	25+3	7	2	0	6+1	3	6	0	5	2
19	DF	(Norway) NOR	Eirik Haugan	36	0	19+1	0	2	0	5+1	0	5	0	3	0
20	MF	(Norway) NOR	Kristian Eriksen	49	12	21+8	4	2	1	6+1	2	4+2	1	4+1	4
21	DF	(Norway) NOR	Martin Linnes	32	6	16+5	5	1+1	0	3+1	0	4	1	0+1	0
22	MF	(Norway) NOR	Magnus Grødem	44	12	17+12	7	0+1	0	4+3	5	0+2	0	2+3	0
25	DF	(Denmark) DEN	Anders Hagelskjær	37	0	15+6	0	1+1	0	5+1	0	3+1	0	4	0
28	DF	(Norway) NOR	Kristoffer Haugen	36	6	18+1	4	1	0	3+1	1	6	1	6	0
31	DF	(Norway) NOR	Mathias Løvik	40	2	16+9	2	1	0	6+1	0	0+1	0	6	0
33	MF	(Norway) NOR	Niklas Ødegård	21	4	2+13	2	0+1	0	2+1	2	0	0	0+2	0
37	MF	(Norway) NOR	Leon-Robin Juberg-Hovland	2	0	0+1	0	0	0	0	0	0	0	0+1	0
46	MF	(Norway) NOR	Andreas Myklebust	3	0	0+2	0	0	0	0+1	0	0	0	0	0
50	FW	(Norway) NOR	Gustav Nyheim	7	0	1+3	0	0	0	1+1	0	0	0	0+1	0
Players away from Molde on loan:
4	DF	(Denmark) DEN	Benjamin Hansen	23	1	10+4	1	2	0	3+1	0	1+2	0	0	0
Players who appeared for Molde no longer at the club:
3	DF	(Norway) NOR	Birk Risa	17	0	10+3	0	1+1	0	1+1	0	0	0	0	0
5	DF	(The Gambia) GAM	Sheriff Sinyan	4	0	3	0	0	0	1	0	0	0	0	0
8	MF	(Norway) NOR	Sivert Mannsverk	25	3	16	3	1	0	2	0	6	0	0	0
11	FW	(Norway) NOR	Ola Brynhildsen	27	11	13+2	7	1+1	1	3+1	2	6	1	0	0
17	FW	(Norway) NOR	Rafik Zekhnini	4	0	0+1	0	0	0	2+1	0	0	0	0	0
23	MF	(Norway) NOR	Eirik Andersen	1	0	0+1	0	0	0	0	0	0	0	0	0
29	DF	(Norway) NOR	Anders Børset	1	0	0	0	0	0	0+1	0	0	0	0	0

=== Goal scorers ===
Rank	Pos.	No.	Nat.	Player	Eliteserien	2022–23 Cup	2023 Cup	UEFA Champions League	UEFA Europa League	Total
1	MF	22	(Norway)	Magnus Grødem	7	0	5	0	0	12
1	MF	16	(Norway)	Emil Breivik	7	0	3	0	2	12
1	MF	20	(Norway)	Kristian Eriksen	4	1	2	1	4	12
4	FW	11	(Norway)	Ola Brynhildsen	7	1	2	1	0	11
5	MF	7	(Norway)	Magnus Wolff Eikrem	6	1	0	1	2	10
6	FW	9	(Norway)	Veton Berisha	5	1	1	0	0	7
6	MF	10	(Norway)	Eric Kitolano	4	0	2	0	1	7
8	DF	21	(Norway)	Martin Linnes	5	0	0	1	0	6
8	DF	28	(Norway)	Kristoffer Haugen	4	0	1	1	0	6
10	FW	8	(Norway)	Fredrik Gulbrandsen	2	0	1	0	2	5
11	MF	5	(Norway)	Eirik Hestad	3	0	0	1	0	4
11	MF	33	(Norway)	Niklas Ødegård	2	0	2	0	0	4
13	MF	8	(Norway)	Sivert Mannsverk	3	0	0	0	0	3
13				Own goal	2	0	0	1	0	3
15	DF	31	(Norway)	Mathias Løvik	2	0	0	0	0	2'
15	MF	6	(Norway)	Martin Ellingsen	1	0	0	1	0	2
17	DF	4	(Denmark)	Benjamin Hansen	1	0	0	0	0	1
17	DF	2	(Norway)	Martin Bjørnbak	0	0	0	0	1	1
TOTALS					65	4	19	8	12	108

=== Clean sheets ===
Rank	Pos.	No.	Nat.	Player	Eliteserien	2022–23 Cup	2023 Cup	UEFA Champions League	UEFA Europa League	Total
1	GK	1	(Norway)	Jacob Karlstrøm	8	0	2	2	0	12
2	GK	12	(Norway)	Oliver Petersen	2	0	4	0	0	6
TOTALS					10	0	6	2	0	18

=== Disciplinary record ===
No.	Pos.	Nat.	Name	Eliteserien		2022–23 Cup		2023 Cup		UEFA Champions League		UEFA Europa League		Total	
No.	Pos.	Nat.	Name	Booked	Sent off (straight red)	Booked	Sent off (straight red)	Booked	Sent off (straight red)	Booked	Sent off (straight red)	Booked	Sent off (straight red)	Booked	Sent off (straight red)
1	GK	(Norway)	Jacob Karlstrøm	1	1	1	0	0	0	0	0	0	0	2	1
2	DF	(Norway)	Martin Bjørnbak	3	0	0	0	0	0	0	0	0	0	3	0
3	DF	(Norway)	Casper Øyvann	1	0	0	0	0	0	0	0	0	0	1	0
6	MF	(Norway)	Martin Ellingsen	2	0	0	0	0	0	0	0	1	0	3	0
7	MF	(Norway)	Magnus Wolff Eikrem	3	1	0	0	0	0	0	0	2	0	5	1
8	FW	(Norway)	Fredrik Gulbrandsen	2	0	0	0	0	0	0	0	0	0	2	0
9	FW	(Norway)	Veton Berisha	1	0	0	0	1	0	1	0	0	0	3	0
10	MF	(Norway)	Eric Kitolano	1	0	0	0	0	0	0	0	0	0	1	0
12	GK	(Norway)	Oliver Petersen	2	0	0	0	1	0	0	0	0	0	3	0
14	MF	(Norway)	Erling Knudtzon	0	0	1	0	0	0	1	0	0	0	2	0
15	MF	(Norway)	Markus Kaasa	2	0	0	0	0	0	0	0	1	0	3	0
16	MF	(Norway)	Emil Breivik	4	0	0	0	0	0	1	0	1	0	6	0
19	DF	(Norway)	Eirik Haugan	5	1	1	0	1	0	2	0	0	0	9	1
20	MF	(Norway)	Kristian Eriksen	3	0	0	0	1	0	1	0	2	0	7	0
21	DF	(Norway)	Martin Linnes	1	0	0	0	0	0	1	0	0	0	2	0
22	MF	(Norway)	Magnus Grødem	2	0	0	0	1	0	0	0	1	0	4	0
25	DF	(Denmark)	Anders Hagelskjær	3	0	0	0	2	0	1	0	0	0	6	0
28	DF	(Norway)	Kristoffer Haugen	1	0	0	0	0	0	1	0	0	0	2	0
31	DF	(Norway)	Mathias Løvik	5	1	0	0	1	0	0	0	2	0	8	1
Players away from Molde on loan:
4	DF	(Denmark)	Benjamin Hansen	3	0	0	0	2	0	0	0	0	0	5	0
Players who appeared for Molde no longer at the club:
3	DF	(Norway)	Birk Risa	2	0	0	0	0	0	0	0	0	0	2	0
8	MF	(Norway)	Sivert Mannsverk	3	0	1	0	1	0	3	0	0	0	8	0
11	FW	(Norway)	Ola Brynhildsen	3	0	0	0	0	0	1	0	0	0	4	0
TOTALS				52	4	4	0	11	0	11	0	10	0	88	4

== See also ==
- Molde FK seasons
