= 2021 Molde FK season =

Molde
2021 season
- Chairman: Odd Ivar Moen
- Manager: Erling Moe
- Stadium: Aker Stadion
- Eliteserien: 2nd
- Norwegian Cup: Fourth Round
- 2020–21 UEFA Europa League: Round of 16
- 2021–22 UEFA Europa Conference League: Third qualifying round
- Top goalscorer: League: Ohi Omoijuanfo (27); All: Ohi Omoijuanfo (28)
- Highest home attendance: 7,325 vs Rosenborg (21 November 2021)
- Lowest home attendance: 0 vs TSG 1899 Hoffenheim (18 February 2021); 0 vs Granada (18 March 2021)
- Average home league attendance: 2,672 (5 December 2021)
Home colours	Away colours	Third colours

The 2021 season is Molde's 14th consecutive year in Eliteserien, and their 45th season in the top flight of Norwegian football. They will also compete in the Norwegian Cup and Europa League and the Europa Conference League.

== Season events ==
On 18 January, Henry Wingo was sold to Ferencváros for an undisclosed fee.

On 1 February, Molde announced the return of Björn Sigurðarson on a two-year contract from Lillestrøm.

On 2 February, Molde announced the signing of Datro Fofana to a four-year contract from AFAD.

On 8 February, Molde's home leg of their UEFA Europa League Round of 32 tie with 1899 Hoffenheim, was moved from their Aker Stadion in Molde to the Estadio de la Cerámica in Villarreal, due to restrictions imposed by Norway on travelers from Germany out of concern of the COVID-19 variant B.1.1.7.

On 15 February, Álex Craninx joined Lillestrøm on loan for the season.

On 4 March, Tobias Christensen was sold to Vålerenga.

On 16 March, Jakob Ørsahl was sold to Raufoss.

On 31 March, the 2021 Eliteserien season, that was due to start on 5 April, was postponed by the till 8 May due to the COVID-19 pandemic in Norway.

On 12 April, Tobias Hestad joined Raufoss on loan for the season.

On 16 April, goalkeeper Oliver Petersen signed a new contract with Molde until the end of the 2024 season.

On 6 May, Molde announced the signing of Magnus Grødem to a three-year contract from Sandnes Ulf.

On 22 June, Molde confirmed that they had sold Marcus Pedersen to Feyenoord, with the transfer being finalised on 1 July.

On 27 July, Adrian Ugelvik joined Brattvåg.

On 28 July, Molde announced the signing of Sivert Mannsverk on a contract until 2025, from Sogndal.

On 31 July, Lillestrøm announced that they had ended Álex Craninx's loan early and that he would return to Molde.

On 8 August, Molde announced that Fredrik Aursnes had been sold to Feyenoord, joining Marcus Pedersen who'd made the same move a few weeks prior, for an undisclosed fee.

On 16 August, Molde announced the signing of Rafik Zekhnini from Fiorentina. The following dat, 17 August, Molde announced the return of Martin Linnes to the club after his Galatasaray contract had expired.

On 19 August, Mathis Bolly joined Stabæk on loan for the remainder of the season.

On 27 August, Mathias Ranmark joined Moss on loan for the remainder of the season.

On 31 August, Stian Gregersen left Molde to sign for Girondins de Bordeaux.

On 9 September, Oliver Petersen joined Grorud on loan for the remainder of the season. The following day, 10 September, Molde announced the signing of Niklas Haugland, who'd been without a club since leaving Leeds United during the summer of 2021, on a contract until the end of 2022.

== Squad ==
As of match played 12 December 2021

No.	Name	Nationality	Position	Date of birth (age)	Signed from	Signed in	Contract ends	Apps.	Goals
Goalkeepers
1	Andreas Linde	(Sweden)	GK	24 July 1993 (aged 28)	Helsingborg	2015	2021	177	0
12	Álex Craninx	(Belgium)	GK	21 October 1995 (aged 26)	Cartagena	2018	2023	29	0
69	Peder Hoel Lervik	(Norway)	GK	24 April 2005 (aged 16)	Academy	2021		0	0
Defenders
2	Martin Bjørnbak	(Norway)	DF	22 March 1992 (aged 29)	Bodø/Glimt	2019	2022	90	4
3	Birk Risa	(Norway)	DF	13 February 1998 (aged 23)	Odd	2020	2023	36	3
5	Sheriff Sinyan	(The Gambia)	DF	19 July 1996 (aged 25)	Lillestrøm	2020	2023	58	3
18	Kristoffer Haraldseid	(Norway)	DF	17 January 1994 (aged 27)	Haugesund	2019	2022	36	1
21	Martin Linnes	(Norway)	DF	20 September 1991 (aged 30)	Unattached	2021		159	14
28	Kristoffer Haugen	(Norway)	DF	21 February 1994 (aged 27)	Viking	2018	2022	116	9
51	Mathias Løvik	(Norway)	DF	6 December 2003 (aged 18)	Academy	2021		3	0
Midfielders
7	Magnus Wolff Eikrem	(Norway)	MF	8 August 1990 (aged 31)	Seattle Sounders FC	2018	2022	211	46
8	Fredrik Sjølstad	(Norway)	MF	29 March 1994 (aged 27)	Kongsvinger	2019	2021	33	1
11	Martin Ellingsen	(Norway)	MF	2 May 1995 (aged 26)	Kongsvinger	2017	2022	94	17
14	Erling Knudtzon	(Norway)	MF	15 December 1988 (aged 32)	Lillestrøm	2019	2023	102	8
15	Magnus Grødem	(Norway)	MF	14 August 1998 (aged 23)	Sandnes Ulf	2021	2024	25	5
16	Etzaz Hussain	(Norway)	MF	27 January 1993 (aged 28)	Rudeš	2017	2022	265	34
17	Rafik Zekhnini	(Norway)	MF	12 January 1998 (aged 23)	Fiorentina	2021		13	0
19	Eirik Hestad	(Norway)	MF	26 June 1995 (aged 26)	Academy	2012	2021	228	36
22	Ola Brynhildsen	(Norway)	MF	27 April 1999 (aged 22)	Stabæk	2020	2022	76	14
23	Eirik Andersen	(Norway)	MF	21 September 1992 (aged 29)	Strømsgodset	2019	2022	53	18
25	Emil Breivik	(Norway)	MF	11 June 2000 (aged 21)	Academy		2025	30	1
27	Sivert Mannsverk	(Norway)	MF	8 May 2002 (aged 19)	Sogndal	2021	2025	18	0
54	Niklas Ødegård	(Norway)	MF	29 March 2004 (aged 17)	Academy	2021		2	0
78	Anders Børset	(Norway)	MF		Academy	2021		1	0
Forwards
9	Ohi Omoijuanfo	(Norway)	FW	10 January 1994 (aged 27)	Stabæk	2019	2021	106	60
10	Björn Sigurðarson	(Iceland)	FW	26 February 1991 (aged 30)	Lillestrøm	2021	2022	67	25
20	Datro Fofana	(Ivory Coast)	FW	22 December 2002 (aged 18)	AFAD	2021	2024	26	2
32	Niklas Haugland	(Norway)	FW	23 February 2002 (aged 19)	Unattached	2021		0	0
52	Albert Tjåland	(Norway)	FW	11 February 2004 (aged 17)	Bryne	2020		1	1
77	Gustav Nyheim	(Norway)	FW	13 February 2006 (aged 15)	Academy	2021		1	0
Out on loan
26	Mathias Ranmark	(Norway)	GK	16 October 1995 (aged 26)	Oppsal	2017	2021	3	0
30	Mathis Bolly	(Ivory Coast)	FW	14 November 1990 (aged 31)	Free agent	2019	2022	52	6
34	Oliver Petersen	(Norway)	GK	26 September 2001 (aged 20)	Follo	2019	2024	7	0
46	Tobias Hestad	(Norway)	MF	29 December 2000 (aged 20)	Academy		2022	1	0
Players who left club during season
6	Stian Gregersen	(Norway)	DF	17 May 1995 (aged 26)	Academy	2013	2022	98	4
15	Tobias Christensen	(Norway)	MF	11 May 2000 (aged 21)	Start	2019	2022	31	2
17	Fredrik Aursnes	(Norway)	MF	10 December 1995 (aged 26)	Hødd	2016	2021	192	20
27	Marcus Pedersen	(Norway)	DF	16 July 2000 (aged 21)	Tromsø	2020	2022	38	3
36	Adrian Ugelvik	(Norway)	DF	21 September 2001 (aged 20)	Academy	2020		1	0
50	Jakob Ørsahl	(Norway)	MF	14 July 2001 (aged 20)	Academy			1	2

== Transfers ==
=== In ===
Date	Position	Nationality	Name	From	Fee	Ref.
1 February 2021	FW	(Iceland)	Björn Sigurðarson	Lillestrøm	Undisclosed	
2 February 2021	FW	(Ivory Coast)	Datro Fofana	AFAD	Undisclosed	
6 May 2021	FW	(Norway)	Magnus Grødem	Sandnes Ulf	Undisclosed	
28 July 2021	MF	(Norway)	Sivert Mannsverk	Sogndal	Undisclosed	
16 August 2021	MF	(Norway)	Rafik Zekhnini	Fiorentina	Undisclosed	
17 August 2021	DF	(Norway)	Martin Linnes	Unattached	Free	
10 September 2021	FW	(Norway)	Niklas Haugland	Unattached	Free	

=== Out ===
Date	Position	Nationality	Name	To	Fee	Ref.
1 January 2021	MF	(Norway)	Henrik Jenset	Træff	Undisclosed	
18 January 2021	MF	(United States)	Henry Wingo	Ferencváros	Undisclosed	
4 March 2021	MF	(Norway)	Tobias Christensen	Vålerenga	Undisclosed	
16 March 2021	MF	(Norway)	Jakob Ørsahl	Raufoss	Undisclosed	
25 March 2021	FW	(Norway)	Markus Eiane	Øygarden	Undisclosed	
22 June 2021†	DF	(Norway)	Marcus Pedersen	Feyenoord	Undisclosed	
27 June 2021†	DF	(Norway)	Adrian Ugelvik	Brattvåg	Undisclosed	
8 August 2021	MF	(Norway)	Fredrik Aursnes	Feyenoord	Undisclosed	
31 August 2021	DF	(Norway)	Stian Gregersen	Girondins de Bordeaux	Undisclosed	

† Pedersen's move was announced on the above date, but was not finalised until 1 July 2021.

=== Loans out ===
Date from	Position	Nationality	Name	To	Date to	Ref.
15 February 2021	GK	(Belgium)	Álex Craninx	Lillestrøm	31 July 2021	
12 April 2021	MF	(Norway)	Tobias Hestad	Raufoss	End of season	
19 August 2021	FW	(Ivory Coast)	Mathis Bolly	Stabæk	End of season	
27 August 2021	GK	(Norway)	Mathias Ranmark	Moss	End of season	
9 September 2021	GK	(Norway)	Oliver Petersen	Grorud	End of season	

=== Released ===
Date	Position	Nationality	Name	Joined	Date	Ref.
31 December 2021	GK	(Norway)	Mathias Ranmark	Moss	28 January 2022	
31 December 2021	GK	(Sweden)	Andreas Linde	Greuther Fürth	10 January 2022	
31 December 2021	MF	(Norway)	Eirik Hestad	Pafos	10 January 2022	
31 December 2021	MF	(Norway)	Fredrik Sjølstad	HamKam	18 January 2022	
31 December 2021	FW	(Norway)	Ohi Omoijuanfo	Red Star Belgrade	1 January 2022	

== Friendlies ==
28 January 2021	Molde	4–0	Brattvåg	Molde
17:00 CET (UTC+1)	L.Fagerlie 2'; Bolly 28'; Hestad 78'; Eikrem 81'	Report		Stadium: Aker Stadion

4 February 2021	Molde	2–1	Brann	Molde
14:00 CET (UTC+1)	Bolly 26', 28'	Report	Delaveris 69'	Stadium: Aker Stadion

17 April 2021	Molde	2–1	Stjørdals-Blink	Molde
14:30 CET (UTC+1)	E.Hestad 45'; Hussain 45+1'	Report	Hauge 27'	Stadium: Aker Stadion

23 April 2021	Kristiansund	0–0	Molde	Kristiansund
14:00 CEST (UTC+2)		Report		Stadium: Kristiansund Stadion

28 April 2021	Molde	2–0	Sogndal	Molde
13:00 CET (UTC+1)	Brynhildsen 6'; Fofana 79'	Report		Stadium: Aker Stadion

2 May 2021	Molde	1–1	Bodø/Glimt	Molde
14:30 CEST (UTC+2)	Gregersen 90+4'	Report	Sørli 35'	Stadium: Aker Stadion

== Competitions ==
=== Europa League ===
==== Knockout phase ====
18 February 2021 Round of 32 1st leg	Molde (Norway)	3–3	(Germany) 1899 Hoffenheim	Villarreal, Spain
21:00 CET (UTC+1)	Ellingsen 41'; Gregersen (yellow card) 62'; Andersen 70'; Fofana 74'	Report	Dabbur 8', 28' (penalty missed) 63'; Baumgartner 45+3'	Stadium: Estadio de la Cerámica; Attendance: 0 Referee: Stéphanie Frappart (France)
Note: Match moved from the Aker Stadion in Molde, to the Estadio de la Cerámica in Villarreal, due to concerns over the COVID-19 variant B.1.1.7.

25 February 2021 Round of 32 2nd leg	1899 Hoffenheim (Germany)	0–2 (3–5 agg.)	(Norway) Molde	Sinsheim, Germany
18:55 CET (UTC+1)	Rudy (yellow card) 83'	Report	Andersen 20', 90+5' (yellow card) 90+5'; Linde (yellow card) 73'; Ellingsen (yellow card) 83'	Stadium: Rhein-Neckar-Arena; Attendance: 0 Referee: Aleksei Kulbakov (Belarus)
Note: Match played behind closed doors due to the COVID-19 pandemic in Germany.

11 March 2021 Last 16 1st leg	Granada (Spain)	2–0	(Norway) Molde	Granada, Spain
21:00 CET (UTC+1)	Molina 26'; Eteki (yellow card) 33'; Soldado 75'	Report	Sigurðarson (yellow card) 48'; Hestad (yellow card) 57'; Ellingsen (yellow card) 68' (yellow-red card) 71'; Eikrem (yellow card) 90'	Stadium: Nuevo Los Cármenes; Attendance: 0 Referee: Paweł Raczkowski (Poland)
Note: Match played behind closed doors due to the COVID-19 pandemic in Spain.

18 March 2021 Last 16 2nd leg	Molde (Norway)	2–1 (2–3 agg.)	(Spain) Granada	Budapest, Hungary
18:55 CET (UTC+1)	Vallejo 29' (o.g.); Risa (yellow card) 62'; Hestad 90' (pen.)	Report	Díaz (yellow card) 7'; Soldado 72'	Stadium: Puskás Aréna; Attendance: 0 Referee: Srđan Jovanović (Serbia)
Note: Match moved from the Aker Stadion in Molde, to the Puskás Aréna in Budapest, due to concerns over the COVID-19 variant B.1.1.7. Match played behind closed doors due to the COVID-19 pandemic in Hungary.

=== Eliteserien ===
==== Results summary ====
Overall								Home						Away					
Pld	W	D	L	GF	GA	GD	Pts	W	D	L	GF	GA	GD	W	D	L	GF	GA	GD
30	18	6	6	70	40	+30	60	11	2	2	46	18	+28	7	4	4	24	22	+2

Last updated: 12 December 2021.
Source: see below

==== Results by match ====
Match	1	2	3	4	5	6	7	8	9	10	11	12	13	14	15	16	17	18	19	20	21	22	23	24	25	26	27	28	29	30
Ground	H	A	H	A	H	A	A	H	H	A	H	A	H	A	H	A	A	H	A	H	A	H	A	H	A	H	H	A	H	A
Result	W	D	W	W	L	D	W	W	W	W	W	L	W	D	W	L	L	W	D	D	W	W	W	L	L	W	W	W	D	W
Position	1	1	1	3	3	4	3	2	2	2	1	1	1	1	1	1	2	1	2	2	2	2	2	2	2	2	2	2	2	2

Updated to match(es) played on 12 December 2021. Source: see below
A = Away; H = Home; W = Win; D = Draw; L = Loss

==== Results ====
9 May 2021 1	Molde	2–0	Kristiansund	Molde
18:00 CEST (UTC+2)	Omoijuanfo (penalty missed) 11'; Andersen 21'; Hussain (yellow card) 24'; Brynhildsen 32'	Report	Kastrati (yellow card) 12'; Willumsson (yellow card) 86'	Stadium: Aker Stadion; Attendance: 600; Referee: Kai Erik Steen

13 May 2021 2	Tromsø	3–3	Molde	Tromsø
18:00 CEST (UTC+2)	Ebiye 11', 44'; Kitolano 64'; R.Jenssen (yellow card) 86'	Report	Omoijuanfo 10', 16'; Pedersen (yellow card) 18'; Brynhildsen 40'; Risa (yellow card) 58'	Stadium: Alfheim Stadion; Attendance: 600; Referee: Sigurd Smehus Kringstad

16 May 2021 3	Molde	4–0	Brann	Molde
20:00 CEST (UTC+2)	Omoijuanfo 29', 42', 53' (yellow card) 55'; Aursnes 38' (yellow card) 83'	Report		Stadium: Aker Stadion; Attendance: 600; Referee: Tore Hansen

24 May 2021 4	Rosenborg	2–3	Molde	Trondheim
20:00 CEST (UTC+2)	Zachariassen 43'; Holse 78'; Molins (yellow card) 90+4'	Report	Hussain 9' (yellow card) 52'; Brynhildsen (yellow card) 73'; Hestad 87'; Bjørnbak 90'	Stadium: Lerkendal Stadion; Attendance: 600; Referee: Espen Eskås

27 May 2021 5	Molde	2–3	Vålerenga	Molde
20:00 CEST (UTC+2)	Haugen 39', 47' (yellow card) 84'	Report	Borchgrevink 2'; Bjørdal (yellow card) 30'; Layouni 62'; Dønnum 81'	Stadium: Aker Stadion; Attendance: 600; Referee: Tom Harald Hagen

30 May 2021 6	Mjøndalen	0–0	Molde	Mjøndalen
15:00 CEST (UTC+2)		Report	Pedersen (yellow card) 90+5'	Stadium: Consto Arena; Attendance: 200; Referee: Dag Vidar Hafsås

12 June 2021 7	Sandefjord	1–3	Molde	Sandefjord
15:00 CEST (UTC+2)	Haugen 16' (o.g.); Vales (yellow card) 71'	Report	Haugen 3', 69'; Omoijuanfo 34'	Stadium: Sandefjord Arena; Attendance: 600; Referee: Rohit Saggi

16 June 2021 16	Molde	4–1	Sarpsborg 08	Molde
18:00 CEST (UTC+2)	Omoijuanfo 51' (yellow card) 79'; Andersen 56'; Bjørnbak 76'; Risa 90+2'	Report	Opseth 84'	Stadium: Aker Stadion; Attendance: 600; Referee: Ola Hobber Nilsen

20 June 2021 8	Molde	2–1	Stabæk	Molde
18:00 CEST (UTC+2)	Omoijuanfo 15', 20'; Risa (yellow card) 47'	Report	Ottesen (yellow card) 54'; Kinoshita 65'	Stadium: Aker Stadion; Attendance: 2,000; Referee: Kristoffer Hagenes

24 June 2021 9	Bodø/Glimt	0–2	Molde	Bodø
18:00 CEST (UTC+2)		Report	Haugen (yellow card) 47'; Omoijuanfo 51', 78'; Andersen (yellow card) 77'	Stadium: Aspmyra Stadion; Attendance: 2,000; Referee: Rohit Saggi

30 June 2021 10	Molde	3–0	Strømsgodset	Molde
18:00 CEST (UTC+2)	Gregersen 7'; Omoijuanfo 27', 29'; Andersen (yellow card) 70'	Report	Gunnarsson (yellow card) 75'	Stadium: Aker Stadion; Attendance: 2,000; Referee: Tore Hansen

4 July 2021 11	Sarpsborg 08	1–0	Molde	Sarpsborg
18:00 CEST (UTC+2)	Thomassen (yellow card) 20'; Salétros (yellow card) 34' (yellow-red card) 88'; Soltvedt (yellow card) 38'; Skålevik 74'	Report	Omoijuanfo (yellow card) 67'	Stadium: Sarpsborg Stadion; Attendance: 2,000; Referee: Svein Oddvar Moen

11 July 2021 12	Molde	5–0	Odd	Molde
18:00 CEST (UTC+2)	Haugen 10'; Sinyan 18'; Omoijuanfo 30', 62'; Grødem 57'	Report		Stadium: Aker Stadion; Attendance: 2,000; Referee: Espen Eskås

18 July 2021 13	Lillestrøm	1–1	Molde	Lillestrøm
18:00 CEST (UTC+2)	Ogbu (yellow card) 75'; Ranger 90+2'	Report	Hussain 42'; Knudtzon (yellow card) 59'; Linde (yellow card) 71'	Stadium: Åråsen Stadion; Attendance: 2,000; Referee: Ola Hobber Nilsen

8 August 2021 14	Molde	5–4	Haugesund	Molde
18:00 CEST (UTC+2)	Omoijuanfo 11', 15', 48'; Hestad 29'; Eikrem 59'	Report	Sandberg 13'; Wadji 18'; Stølås 28'; Therkildsen (yellow card) 59'; Ndour 83'; Samuelsen (yellow card) 90+3'	Stadium: Aker Stadion; Attendance: 2,000; Referee: Ola Hobber Nilsen

15 August 2021 15	Viking	3–2	Molde	Stavanger
18:00 CEST (UTC+2)	Heggheim (yellow card) 17'; Kabran 66'; Tripić 73' (pen.); Brekalo 90+1'	Report	Risa 26'; Andersen 39'; Bjørnbak (yellow card) 56'; Gregersen (yellow card) 72'; Mannsverk (yellow card) 86'	Stadium: Viking Stadion; Attendance: 3,704; Referee: Tom Harald Hagen

29 August 2021 17	Kristiansund	2–0	Molde	Kristiansund
18:00 CEST (UTC+2)	Mawa 57'; Muçolli 59'	Report		Stadium: Kristiansund Stadion; Attendance: 1,911; Referee: Ola Hobber Nilsen

12 September 2021 18	Molde	4–0	Mjøndalen	Molde
18:00 CEST (UTC+2)	Omoijuanfo 14', 82'; Ellingsen 36' (pen.) (yellow card) 80'; Knudtzon 90+1'	Report	Sporrong (yellow card) 43'	Stadium: Aker Stadion; Attendance: 2,477; Referee: Kristoffer Hagenes

19 September 2021 19	Vålerenga	1–1	Molde	Oslo
18:00 CEST (UTC+2)	Layouni (yellow card) 18'; Bjørdal 31' (pen.)	Report	Andersen (yellow card) 42'; Ellingsen 44' (pen.); Hussain (yellow card) 51'	Stadium: Intility Arena; Attendance: 7,084; Referee: Mohammad Usman Aslam

26 September 2021 20	Molde	2–2	Viking	Molde
18:00 CEST (UTC+2)	Eikrem (yellow card) 23'; Andersen 34'; Sinyan (yellow card) 64'; Omoijuanfo 71'; Bjørnbak (yellow card) 88'	Report	Stensness (yellow card) 39'; Friðjónsson 70'; Pattynama 72'	Stadium: Aker Stadion; Attendance: 3,134; Referee: Tore Hansen

3 October 2021 21	Odd	1–3	Molde	Skien
18:00 CEST (UTC+2)	Wallem (yellow card) 28'; Bjørtuft (yellow card) 88'	Report	Andersen 19', 64'; Omoijuanfo 42'; Linnes (yellow card) 52'	Stadium: Skagerak Arena; Attendance: 6,655; Referee: Sigurd Smehus Kringstad

16 October 2021 22	Molde	3–0	Tromsø	Molde
18:00 CEST (UTC+2)	Haugen 34'; Ellingsen (yellow card) 57'; Mannsverk (yellow card) 63'; Brynhildsen 79'; Bjørnbak 83'	Report		Stadium: Aker Stadion; Attendance: 6,796; Referee: Svein Oddvar Moen

23 October 2021 23	Stabæk	0–3	Molde	Bærum
18:00 CEST (UTC+2)	Jenssen (yellow card) 39'	Report	Mesík 17' (o.g.); Risa (yellow card) 21' (yellow-red card) 35'; Linde (yellow card) 26'; Breivik (yellow card) 37'; Omoijuanfo 49', 84' (penalty missed) 66'	Stadium: Nadderud Stadion; Attendance: 2,413; Referee: Kristoffer Hagenes

27 October 2021 24	Molde	0–2	Bodø/Glimt	Molde
20:00 CEST (UTC+2)	Haugen (yellow card) 66'	Report	Vetlesen 47'; Solbakken 56' (yellow card) 90+2'	Stadium: Aker Stadion; Attendance: 6,551; Referee: Espen Eskås

31 October 2021 25	Strømsgodset	6–0	Molde	Drammen
18:00 CET (UTC+1)	Friday 37'; Parr (yellow card) 39'; Hove 41'; Stengel 45' (pen.); Gulliksen 75', 90+3'; Tokstad 90'	Report	Hussain (yellow card) 44'; Bjørnbak (red card) 56'	Stadium: Marienlyst Stadion; Attendance: 3,335; Referee: Sivert Amland

7 November 2021 26	Molde	3–1	Sandefjord	Molde
17:00 CET (UTC+1)	Eikrem 8'; Brynhildsen 14'; Sinyan 34'	Report	Brenden 82'	Stadium: Aker Stadion; Attendance: 4,698; Referee: Tom Harald Hagen

21 November 2021 27	Molde	4–1	Rosenborg	Molde
19:00 CET (UTC+1)	Omoijuanfo 28'; Eikrem 38'; Sinyan 60'; Breivik 88'	Report	Henriksen (yellow card) 3'; Skjelbred (yellow card) 48'; Islamović 55' (yellow card) 68'	Stadium: Aker Stadion; Attendance: 7,325; Referee: Kristoffer Hagenes

28 November 2021 28	Brann	0–1	Molde	Bergen
19:00 CET (UTC+1)		Report	Haugen (yellow card) 32'; Eikrem 60'	Stadium: Brann Stadion; Attendance: 9,824; Referee: Ola Hobber Nilsen

5 December 2021 29	Molde	3–3	Lillestrøm	Molde
17:00 CET (UTC+1)	Risa 63'; Hestad 79'; Omoijuanfo 82'; Bjørnbak (yellow card) 85'; Brynhildsen (yellow card) 90'; Eikrem (yellow card) 90+5'	Report	Åsen 32'; Edh 46' (yellow card) 90+4'; Ogbu (yellow card) 63'; Olsen 88'; Garnås (yellow card) 90'	Stadium: Aker Stadion; Attendance: 4,673; Referee: Rohit Saggi

12 December 2021 30	Haugesund	1–2	Molde	Haugesund
17:00 CET (UTC+1)	Søderlund (yellow card) 43'; Risa 63' (o.g.)	Report	Risa (yellow card) 21'; Linnes (yellow card) 23'; Omoijuanfo 37'; Brynhildsen 56' (yellow card) 89'; Breivik (yellow card) 69'	Stadium: Haugesund Stadion; Attendance: 3,678; Referee: Espen Eskås

==== Table ====
Pos	Team	Pld	W	D	L	GF	GA	GD	Pts	Qualification or relegation
1	Bodø/Glimt (C)	30	18	9	3	59	25	+34	63	Qualification for the Champions League first qualifying round
2	Molde	30	18	6	6	70	40	+30	60	Qualification for the Europa Conference League second qualifying round (Note: Since the winners of the 2021 Norwegian Cup, Molde, have already qualified for European competitions based on league position, the last European spot was passed down to the fourth placed team, Lillestrøm.)
3	Viking	30	17	6	7	60	47	+13	57	Qualification for the Europa Conference League second qualifying round
4	Lillestrøm	30	14	7	9	49	40	+9	49	Qualification for the Europa Conference League second qualifying round
5	Rosenborg	30	13	9	8	58	42	+16	48	

Source: Football Association of Norway (in Norwegian)
Rules for classification: 1) Points; 2) Goal difference; 3) Goals scored; 4) Head-to-head points; 5) Head-to-head goal difference; 6) Head-to-head away goals scored (only if between two teams); 7) Head-to-head goals scored; 8) Play-off (only used to decide champions or relegation).
(C) Champions

=== Norwegian Cup ===
25 July 2021 First round	Spjelkavik	1–4	Molde	Ålesund
15:00 CEST (UTC+2)	S.Skulstad (yellow card) 27'; Ø.Heia 87'; J.Fylling (yellow card) 90'	Report	Grødem 32'; Fofana 62'; Brynhildsen 64'; Tjåland 90+3'	Stadium: Spjelkavik stadion Referee: Mathias Smehus Kringstad

1 August 2021 Second round	Hødd	1–2	Molde	Ulsteinvik
16:00 CEST (UTC+2)	P-H.Mouasso (yellow card) 29'; B.Rise 69' (yellow card) 89'	Report	Grødem 35' (pen.), 90+1' (pen.)	Stadium: Nye Høddvoll; Referee: Harald Røvig Sletner

22 September 2021 Third round	Bryne	1–4	Molde	Bryne
18:00 CEST (UTC+2)	A.Dybevik 19'; K.Hay (yellow card) 71'	Report	Eikrem 12'; Sinyan (yellow card) 21' (yellow-red card) 40'; Grødem 26'; Andersen 63'; Bjørnbak 75'	Stadium: Bryne Stadion; Attendance: 730; Referee: Jan Morten Tennøy

Fourth round took place during the 2022 season.

=== Europa Conference League ===
==== Qualifying rounds ====
22 July 2021 Second qualifying round 1st leg	Molde (Norway)	3–0	(Switzerland) Servette	Molde, Norway
18:00 CEST (UTC+2)	Brynhildsen 7'; Omoijuanfo 31'; Eikrem (yellow card) 45+3' (goal) 59'; Risa (yellow card) 57'	Report	Valls (yellow card) 64'; Rouiller (yellow card) 74'	Stadium: Aker Stadion; Attendance: 1,925; Referee: Duje Strukan (Croatia)

29 July 2021 Second qualifying round 2nd leg	Servette (Switzerland)	2–0 (2–3 agg.)	(Norway) Molde	Lancy, Switzerland
20:30 CEST (UTC+2)	Frick (yellow card) 8'; Diallo 18' (yellow card) 83'; Stevanović (red card) 44'; Clichy (yellow card) 45+4'; Kyei 59' (yellow card) 66'; Douline (yellow card) 90+1'; Rodelin (yellow card) 90+7'	Report	Haugen (yellow card) 8'; Brynhildsen (yellow card) 42'; Breivik (yellow card) 90+4'	Stadium: Stade de Genève; Attendance: 3,842; Referee: Jochem Kamphuis (Netherlands)

5 August 2021 Third qualifying round 1st leg	Trabzonspor (Turkey)	3–3	(Norway) Molde	Trabzon, Turkey
19:30 CEST (UTC+2)	Nwakaeme 15'; Hugo 58'; Djaniny 74'; Bakasetas (yellow card) 87'	Report	Brynhildsen 31', 64' (yellow card) 87'; Risa (yellow card) 57'; Sinyan (yellow card) 80'; Hussain 85'	Stadium: Şenol Güneş Sports Complex; Attendance: 12,415; Referee: Harm Osmers (Germany)

12 August 2021 Third qualifying round 2nd leg	Molde (Norway)	1–1 (a.e.t.) (4–4 agg.) (3–4 p)	(Turkey) Trabzonspor	Molde, Norway
18:00 CEST (UTC+2)	Bjørnbak (yellow card) 38'; Eikrem (yellow card) 62'; Sigurðarson 90+7'; Gregersen (yellow card) 119'	Report	Bakasetas (yellow card) 56'; Ié 57'; Hugo (yellow card) 107'; Parmak (yellow card) 120'	Stadium: Aker Stadion; Attendance: 2,792; Referee: Ádám Farkas (Hungary)
	Penalties
	Andersen (penalty missed); Grødem (penalty scored); Sigurðarson (penalty scored); Fofana (penalty missed); Risa (penalty scored)		(penalty scored) Bakasetas; (penalty scored) Peres; (penalty scored) Özdemir; (penalty missed) Ié; (penalty scored) Trondsen

== Squad statistics ==
As of match played 12 December 2021

=== Appearances and goals ===
No.	Pos	Nat	Player	Total		Eliteserien		Norwegian Cup		Europa League		Europa Conference League	
No.	Pos	Nat	Player	Apps	Goals	Apps	Goals	Apps	Goals	Apps	Goals	Apps	Goals
1	GK	(Sweden) SWE	Andreas Linde	34	0	25	0	1	0	4	0	4	0
2	DF	(Norway) NOR	Martin Bjørnbak	34	4	26+1	3	2	1	2	0	2+1	0
3	DF	(Norway) NOR	Birk Risa	26	3	13+4	3	3	0	2	0	2+2	0
5	DF	(The Gambia) GAM	Sheriff Sinyan	33	3	23+1	3	2	0	2+1	0	4	0
7	MF	(Norway) NOR	Magnus Wolff Eikrem	34	6	21+3	4	1+1	1	4	0	3+1	1
8	MF	(Norway) NOR	Fredrik Sjølstad	6	0	0+6	0	0	0	0	0	0	0
9	FW	(Norway) NOR	Ohi Omoijuanfo	33	28	28+1	27	0+1	0	0	0	3	1
10	FW	(Iceland) ISL	Björn Sigurðarson	9	1	0+1	0	1	0	4	0	0+3	1
11	MF	(Norway) NOR	Martin Ellingsen	11	3	6+1	2	1	0	3	1	0	0
12	GK	(Belgium) BEL	Álex Craninx	1	0	0	0	1	0	0	0	0	0
14	MF	(Norway) NOR	Erling Knudtzon	36	1	15+10	1	1+2	0	1+3	0	4	0
15	MF	(Norway) NOR	Magnus Grødem	29	5	1+18	1	3	4	4	0	0+3	0
16	MF	(Norway) NOR	Etzaz Hussain	32	5	23+4	2	1	2	0+1	0	3	1
17	MF	(Norway) NOR	Rafik Zekhnini	13	0	5+7	0	0+1	0	0	0	0	0
19	MF	(Norway) NOR	Eirik Hestad	26	4	13+4	3	0+2	0	2+1	1	4	0
20	FW	(Ivory Coast) CIV	Datro Fofana	26	2	1+17	0	3	1	0+3	1	1+1	0
21	DF	(Norway) NOR	Martin Linnes	11	0	9+2	0	0	0	0	0	0	0
22	MF	(Norway) NOR	Ola Brynhildsen	37	9	29+1	5	1+2	1	0	0	4	3
23	MF	(Norway) NOR	Eirik Andersen	30	10	16+7	6	1	1	4	3	0+2	0
25	MF	(Norway) NOR	Emil Breivik	27	1	9+11	1	1+1	0	1	0	0+4	0
27	MF	(Norway) NOR	Sivert Mannsverk	18	0	11+3	0	2	0	0	0	2	0
28	DF	(Norway) NOR	Kristoffer Haugen	32	6	20+5	6	1	0	3+1	0	2	0
51	DF	(Norway) NOR	Mathias Løvik	3	0	0	0	2	0	0	0	0+1	0
52	FW	(Norway) NOR	Albert Tjåland	1	1	0	0	0+1	1	0	0	0	0
54	MF	(Norway) NOR	Niklas Ødegård	2	0	0	0	2	0	0	0	0	0
77	FW	(Norway) NOR	Gustav Nyheim	1	0	0	0	0+1	0	0	0	0	0
78	MF	(Norway) NOR	Anders Børset	1	0	0	0	0+1	0	0	0	0	0
Players away from Molde on loan:
30	FW	(Ivory Coast) CIV	Mathis Bolly	12	0	0+8	0	0	0	1+2	0	0+1	0
34	GK	(Norway) NOR	Oliver Petersen	6	0	5	0	1	0	0	0	0	0
Players who appeared for Molde no longer at the club:
6	DF	(Norway) NOR	Stian Gregersen	21	1	11+3	1	1	0	3	0	3	0
15	MF	(Norway) NOR	Tobias Christensen	1	0	0	0	0	0	0+1	0	0	0
17	MF	(Norway) NOR	Fredrik Aursnes	22	1	13	1	1+1	0	4	0	3	0
27	DF	(Norway) NOR	Marcus Pedersen	11	0	5+2	0	0	0	4	0	0	0
36	DF	(Norway) NOR	Adrian Ugelvik	1	0	0	0	0+1	0	0	0	0	0

=== Goal scorers ===
Rank	Pos.	No.	Nat.	Player	Eliteserien	Norwegian Cup	Europa League	Europa Conference League	Total
1	FW	9	(Norway)	Ohi Omoijuanfo	27	0	0	1	28
2	MF	23	(Norway)	Eirik Andersen	6	1	3	0	10
3	MF	22	(Norway)	Ola Brynhildsen	5	1	0	3	9
4	DF	28	(Norway)	Kristoffer Haugen	6	0	0	0	6
4	MF	7	(Norway)	Magnus Wolff Eikrem	4	1	0	1	6
6	MF	15	(Norway)	Magnus Grødem	1	4	0	0	5
7	DF	2	(Norway)	Martin Bjørnbak	3	1	0	0	4
7	MF	19	(Norway)	Eirik Hestad	3	0	1	0	4
9	DF	5	(The Gambia)	Sheriff Sinyan	3	0	0	0	3
9	DF	3	(Norway)	Birk Risa	3	0	0	0	3
9	MF	11	(Norway)	Martin Ellingsen	2	0	1	0	3
9	MF	16	(Norway)	Etzaz Hussain	2	0	0	1	3
13	FW	20	(Ivory Coast)	Datro Fofana	0	1	1	0	2
14	MF	17	(Norway)	Fredrik Aursnes	1	0	0	0	1
14	DF	6	(Norway)	Stian Gregersen	1	0	0	0	1
14	MF	14	(Norway)	Erling Knudtzon	1	0	0	0	1
14	MF	25	(Norway)	Emil Breivik	1	0	0	0	1
14	FW	52	(Norway)	Albert Tjåland	0	1	0	0	1
14	FW	10	(Iceland)	Björn Sigurðarson	0	0	0	1	1
14				Own goal	1	0	1	0	2
TOTALS					70	10	7	7	94

=== Clean sheets ===
Rank	Pos.	No.	Nat.	Player	Eliteserien	Norwegian Cup	Europa League	Europa Conference League	Total
1	GK	1	(Sweden)	Andreas Linde	7	0	1	1	9
2	GK	34	(Norway)	Oliver Petersen	2	0	0	0	2
TOTALS					9	0	1	1	11

=== Disciplinary record ===
No.	Pos.	Nat.	Name	Eliteserien		Norwegian Cup		Europa League		Europa Conference League		Total	
No.	Pos.	Nat.	Name	Booked	Sent off (straight red)	Booked	Sent off (straight red)	Booked	Sent off (straight red)	Booked	Sent off (straight red)	Booked	Sent off (straight red)
1	GK	(Sweden)	Andreas Linde	2	0	0	0	1	0	0	0	3	0
2	DF	(Norway)	Martin Bjørnbak	3	1	0	0	0	0	1	0	4	1
3	DF	(Norway)	Birk Risa	5	1	0	0	1	0	2	0	8	1
5	DF	(The Gambia)	Sheriff Sinyan	1	0	2	1	0	0	1	0	4	1
7	MF	(Norway)	Magnus Wolff Eikrem	2	0	0	0	1	0	2	0	5	0
9	FW	(Norway)	Ohi Omoijuanfo	3	0	0	0	0	0	0	0	3	0
10	FW	(Iceland)	Björn Sigurðarson	0	0	0	0	1	0	0	0	1	0
11	MF	(Norway)	Martin Ellingsen	2	0	0	0	3	1	0	0	5	1
14	MF	(Norway)	Erling Knudtzon	1	0	0	0	0	0	0	0	1	0
16	MF	(Norway)	Etzaz Hussain	4	0	0	0	0	0	0	0	4	0
17	MF	(Norway)	Fredrik Aursnes	1	0	0	0	0	0	0	0	1	0
19	MF	(Norway)	Eirik Hestad	0	0	0	0	1	0	0	0	1	0
21	DF	(Norway)	Martin Linnes	2	0	0	0	0	0	0	0	2	0
22	MF	(Norway)	Ola Brynhildsen	3	0	0	0	0	0	2	0	5	0
23	MF	(Norway)	Eirik Andersen	3	0	0	0	1	0	0	0	4	0
25	MF	(Norway)	Emil Breivik	2	0	0	0	0	0	1	0	3	0
27	MF	(Norway)	Sivert Mannsverk	2	0	0	0	0	0	0	0	2	0
28	DF	(Norway)	Kristoffer Haugen	4	0	0	0	0	0	1	0	5	0
Players who appeared for Molde no longer at the club:
6	DF	(Norway)	Stian Gregersen	1	0	0	0	1	0	1	0	3	0
27	DF	(Norway)	Marcus Pedersen	2	0	0	0	0	0	0	0	2	0
TOTALS				43	1	2	1	10	1	11	0	66	3

== See also ==
- Molde FK seasons
