= Sheriff Sinyan =

Gambian footballer (born 1996)

Personal information
- Date of birth: 19 July 1996 (age 30)
- Place of birth: Oslo, Norway
- Height: 1.88 m (6 ft 2 in)
- Positions: Centre-back; defensive midfielder

Team information
- Current team: Rapid București
- Number: 18

Youth career
- –2012: Oppsal
- 2013: Holmlia
- 2014–2015: Lillestrøm

Senior career*
Years	Team	Apps	(Gls)
2013	Holmlia	9	(3)
2015–2016	Lillestrøm II		
2015–2020	Lillestrøm	29	(1)
2020–2023	Molde	46	(3)
2023–2024	Slavia Prague	4	(0)
2024	Odd	12	(1)
2025–2026	CFR Cluj	38	(1)
2026–	Rapid București	5	(0)

International career^{‡}
2019–	Gambia	13	(1)
- * Club domestic league appearances and goals as of 7 November 2026 ‡ National team caps and goals as of 31 March 2026

Sheriff Sinyan (born 19 July 1996) is a professional footballer who plays as a centre-back or a defensive midfielder for Liga I club Rapid București. Born in Norway, he represents The Gambia internationally.

== Club career ==
Sinyan played youth football for Oppsal IF and Holmlia SK, and also featured briefly in Holmlia's senior team before joining the junior ranks of larger club Lillestrøm.

In April 2016, Sinyan signed a two-year contract with Lillestrøm SK's senior team. Sinyan featured in the first two rounds of both the 2015 and 2016 Norwegian Football Cups, and made his league debut with substitute appearances against Sarpsborg 08 and Strømsgodset in July 2016.

After 2016 Sinyan suffered a long-time injury period, not making his comeback until September 2018 for Lillestrøm's B team.

On 30 June 2020, Molde FK announced the signing of Sinyan on a three-year contract from Lillestrøm.

On 4 July 2023, Sinyan signed for Czech First League club Slavia Prague on a one-year contract with the option for a further year.

== International career ==
Sinyan made his Gambia national team debut on 12 June 2019 in a friendly against Morocco, as a half-time substitute for Ebou Adams.

== Career statistics ==
=== Club ===
As of match played 7 November 2026

Appearances and goals by club, season and competition
Club	Season	League			National cup (Note: Includes Norwegian Cup, Czech Cup, Cupa României)		Europe		Other		Total	
Club	Season	Division	Apps	Goals	Apps	Goals	Apps	Goals	Apps	Goals	Apps	Goals
Holmlia	2013	3. divisjon	9	3	0	0	—		—		9	3
Lillestrøm	2015	Tippeligaen	0	0	2	0	—		—		2	0
Lillestrøm	2016	Tippeligaen	10	1	2	0	—		—		12	1
Lillestrøm	2017	Eliteserien	0	0	0	0	—		—		0	0
Lillestrøm	2018	Eliteserien	0	0	0	0	0	0	—		0	0
Lillestrøm	2019	Eliteserien	19	0	3	0	—		2 (Note: Appearance in Eliteserien promotion/relegation play-offs)	0	24	0
Lillestrøm	Total		29	1	7	0	0	0	2	0	38	1
Molde	2020	Eliteserien	19	0	—		6 (Note: Two appearances in UEFA Champions League, four appearances in UEFA Europa League)	0	—		25	0
Molde	2021	Eliteserien	24	3	2	0	7 (Note: Three appearances in UEFA Europa League, four appearances in UEFA Europa Conference League)	0	—		33	3
Molde	2022	Eliteserien	0	0	0	0	—		—		0	0
Molde	2023	Eliteserien	3	0	1	0	—		—		4	0
Molde	Total		46	3	3	0	13	0	—		62	3
Slavia Prague	2023–24	Czech First League	4	0	1	0	0	0	—		5	0
Odd	2024	Eliteserien	12	1	—		—		—		12	1
CFR Cluj	2024–25	Liga I	3	0	3	0	—		—		6	0
CFR Cluj	2025–26	Liga I	35	1	3	1	5 (Note: Four appearances and two goals in UEFA Europa League, one appearance in UEFA Europa Conference League)	2	1 (Note: Appearance in Supercupa României)	0	44	4
CFR Cluj	Total		38	1	6	1	5	2	1	0	50	4
Rapid București	2026–27	Liga I	5	0	1	0	—		—		6	0
Career total			143	9	18	1	18	2	3	0	182	12

=== International ===
As of match played 31 March 2026

Appearances and goals by national team and year
National team	Year	Apps	Goals
Gambia	2019	5	0
Gambia	2025	7	1
Gambia	2026	1	0
Total		13	1

As of match played 5 September 2025. Gambia score listed first, score column indicates score after each Sinyan goal.

List of international goals scored by Sheriff Sinyan
No.	Date	Venue	Opponent	Score	Result	Competition
1	5 September 2025	Kasarani Stadium, Nairobi, Kenya	Kenya	1–0	3–1	2026 FIFA World Cup qualification

== Honours ==
Lillestrøm

- Norwegian Cup: 2017
- Mesterfinalen runner-up: 2018

Molde

- Eliteserien: 2022

CFR Cluj

- Cupa României: 2024–25
- Supercupa României runner-up: 2025
