= Anders Børset =

Norwegian footballer

Personal information
- Full name: Anders Rønne Børset
- Date of birth: 22 February 2006 (age 20)
- Place of birth: Hommelvik, Norway
- Height: 1.86 m (6 ft 1 in)
- Position: Centre-back

Team information
- Current team: Kristiansund
- Number: 2

Youth career
- 2017–2018: Hommelvik IL
- 2018–2020: SK Trygg/Lade
- 2020–2022: Molde

Senior career*
Years	Team	Apps	(Gls)
2022–2023	Molde	1	(0)
2023–2025	Wolfsburg	0	(0)
2025–	Kristiansund	0	(0)

International career^{‡}
2021	Norway U15	7	(0)
2022	Norway U16	13	(0)
2023	Norway U17	9	(1)
2023	Norway U18	2	(0)
- * Club domestic league appearances and goals as of 16:40, 10 September 2025 (UTC) ‡ National team caps and goals as of 19:35, 31 October 2023 (UTC)

Anders Rønne Børset (born 22 February 2006) is a Norwegian professional footballer who plays as a centre-back for Kristiansund.

== Club career ==
Børset is a youth product of the Norwegian clubs Hommelvik IL, SK Trygg/Lade and Molde. In the winter of 2021, he signed his first professional contract with Molde. He made his senior and professional debut with Molde in a 2–1 Eliteserien win over Vålerenga on 13 November 2022. On 15 June 2023, he moved to the German club Wolfsburg on a 2-year contract.

== International career ==
Mora is a youth international for Norway. He has played up to the Norway U18s.

== Career statistics ==
As of match played 24 September 2025

Appearances and goals by club, season and competition
Club	Season	League			National Cup		Europe		Total	
Club	Season	Division	Apps	Goals	Apps	Goals	Apps	Goals	Apps	Goals
Molde	2021	Eliteserien	0	0	1	0	—		1	0
Molde	2022	Eliteserien	1	0	1	0	—		2	0
Molde	2023	Eliteserien	0	0	1	0	—		1	0
Molde	Total		1	0	3	0	—		4	0
Wolfsburg	2023–24	Bundesliga	0	0	0	0	—		0	0
Wolfsburg	2024–25	Bundesliga	0	0	0	0	—		0	0
Wolfsburg	Total		0	0	0	0	—		0	0
Kristiansund	2025	Eliteserien	0	0	1	0	—		1	0
Career total			1	0	4	0	0	0	5	0
