= Niklas Ødegård =

Norwegian footballer (born 2004)

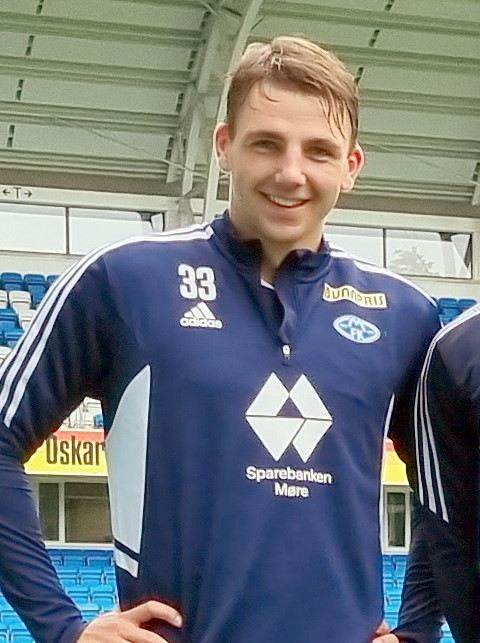
- Niklas Ødegård

Personal information
- Full name: Niklas Ødegård
- Date of birth: 29 March 2004 (age 22)
- Place of birth: Hollingen, Norway
- Height: 1.89 m (6 ft 2 in)
- Position: Midfielder

Team information
- Current team: Molde
- Number: 6

Youth career
- –2020: Ekko/Aureosen
- 2020: Molde

Senior career*
Years	Team	Apps	(Gls)
2019	Ekko/Aureosen	9	(8)
2021–2024	Molde 2	22	(20)
2021–2025	Molde	33	(3)
2024	→ HamKam (loan)	18	(2)
2025–2026	Kristiansund	38	(2)
2026–	Molde	5	(0)

International career^{‡}
2021	Norway U17	4	(2)
2022	Norway U18	4	(0)
2022	Norway U19	12	(2)
2023	Norway U20	1	(0)
2025–	Norway U21	11	(1)
- * Club domestic league appearances and goals as of 29 September 2026 ‡ National team caps and goals as of 14 November 2026

Niklas Ødegård (born 29 March 2004) is a Norwegian footballer who plays as a midfielder for Molde.

== Early life ==
Ødegård hails from Hollingen in Aukra Municipality.

== Club career ==
Ødegård played youth football for Ekko/Aureosen, and made his senior debut for the team in 2019, then on the seventh tier of Norwegian football.

=== Molde ===
Ødegård made his debut for Molde on 25 July 2021, in a 4–1 NM Cup First Round victory over Spjelkavik.

On 6 April 2023, Ødegård extended his contract with Molde until 2025.

==== HamKam loan ====
On 20 March 2024, Ødegård joined HamKam on loan for the season. The loan was terminated early, and Ødegård returned to Molde on 19 August 2024.

== Career statistics ==
=== Club ===
As of match played 1 June 2025

Club	Season	League			National Cup		Continental		Total	
Club	Season	Division	Apps	Goals	Apps	Goals	Apps	Goals	Apps	Goals
Molde	2021	Eliteserien	0	0	2	0	0	0	2	0
Molde	2022	Eliteserien	11	1	3	1	1 (Note: Appearances in UEFA Europa Conference League)	0	15	2
Molde	2023	Eliteserien	15	2	4	2	2 (Note: Appearances in UEFA Europa League)	0	21	4
Molde	2024	Eliteserien	7	0	1	0	4	0	12	0
Molde	Total		33	3	10	3	7	0	50	6
HamKam (loan)	2024	Eliteserien	18	2	4	4	-		22	6
Kristiansund	2025	Eliteserien	10	0	4	0	-		14	0
Career total			61	5	18	7	7	0	86	12

== Honours ==
=== Molde ===
- Eliteserien: 2022
- Norwegian Cup: 2021-22, 2023

=== Individual ===
- UEFA European Under-19 Championship Team of the Tournament: 2023
