= Oliver Petersen =

Norwegian footballer (born 2001)

Personal information
- Date of birth: 26 September 2001 (age 25)
- Height: 1.90 m (6 ft 3 in)
- Position: Goalkeeper

Team information
- Current team: Kolbotn
- Number: 12

Youth career
- –2017: Follo
- 2018–2020: Molde

Senior career*
Years	Team	Apps	(Gls)
2018	Follo	12	(0)
2021–	Molde	18	(0)
2021	→ Grorud (loan)	0	(0)
2024	→ Lillestrøm (loan)	0	(0)
2025–	→ Kolbotn (loan)	9	(0)

International career^{‡}
2018	Norway U17	1	(0)
2019	Norway U18	6	(0)
- * Club domestic league appearances and goals as of 15 April 2025 ‡ National team caps and goals as of 16 October 2021

Oliver Petersen (born 26 September 2001) is a Norwegian football goalkeeper who plays for Kolbotn, on loan from Molde.

== Career ==
Petersen hails from Siggerud. Playing youth and senior football for local umbrella team Follo FK, he was their goalkeeper in the first half of the 2018 3. divisjon before moving on to Molde's junior team. He also became a Norwegian youth international. Petersen got a one-off appearance in the 2019 Norwegian Football Cup, but was first drafted into the senior team in 2021, making his Eliteserien debut in June 2021 against Sandefjord.

== Career statistics ==
As of 15 March 2024

Appearances and goals by club, season and competition
Club	Season	League			National Cup		Europe		Total	
Club	Season	Division	Apps	Goals	Apps	Goals	Apps	Goals	Apps	Goals
Follo	2018	3. divisjon	12	0	1	0	—		13	0
Follo	Total		12	0	1	0	—		13	0
Molde	2019	Eliteserien	0	0	1	0	0	0	1	0
Molde	2020	Eliteserien	0	0	—		0	0	0	0
Molde	2021	Eliteserien	5	0	1	0	0	0	6	0
Molde	2022	Eliteserien	4	0	3	0	0	0	7	0
Molde	2023	Eliteserien	9	0	4	0	5 (Note: Appearances in the UEFA Europa League)	0	18	0
Molde	2024	Eliteserien	0	0	0	0	4 (Note: Appearances in the UEFA Europa Conference League)	0	4	0
Molde	Total		18	0	9	0	9	0	36	0
Grorud	2021	1. divisjon	0	0	0	0	—		0	0
Career total			30	0	10	0	9	0	49	0

== Honours ==
- Norwegian Cup: 2021–22, 2023
