= Sivert Mannsverk =

Norwegian footballer (born 2002)

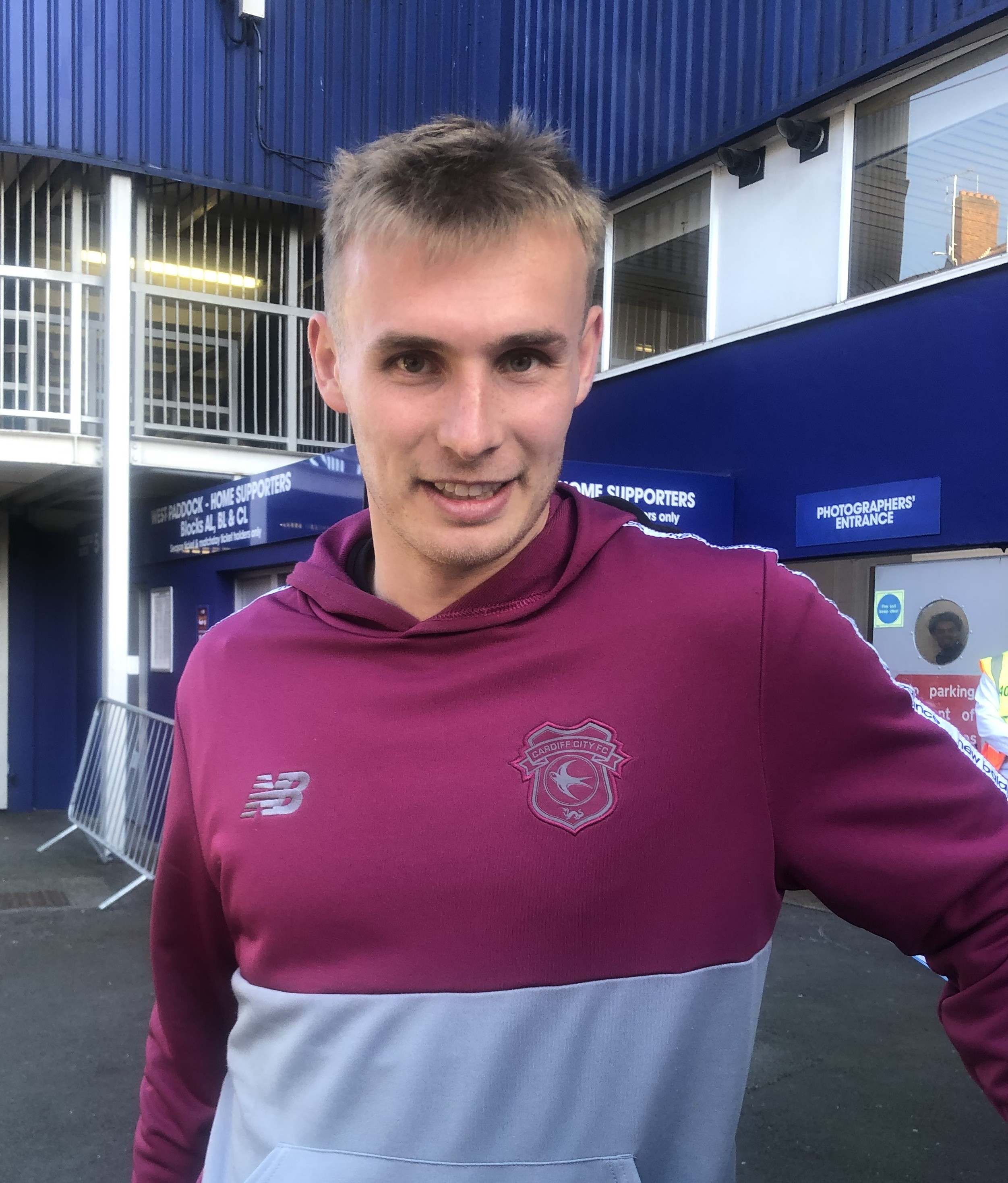
- Mannsverk in 2025.

Personal information
- Full name: Sivert Heggheim Mannsverk
- Date of birth: 8 May 2002 (age 24)
- Place of birth: Øvre Årdal, Norway
- Height: 1.85 m (6 ft 1 in)
- Position: Central midfielder

Team information
- Current team: Sparta Prague
- Number: 20

Youth career
- –2019: Sogndal

Senior career*
Years	Team	Apps	(Gls)
2019–2021	Sogndal	51	(6)
2021–2023	Molde	55	(5)
2023–2026	Ajax	15	(0)
2024–2026	Jong Ajax	6	(0)
2025	→ Cardiff City (loan)	14	(0)
2025–2026	→ Sparta Prague (loan)	19	(0)
2026–	Sparta Prague	0	(0)

International career^{‡}
2017	Norway U15	2	(0)
2018	Norway U16	2	(0)
2019	Norway U17	3	(0)
2019	Norway U18	9	(2)
2022	Norway U20	1	(0)
2021–2023	Norway U21	12	(2)
- * Club domestic league appearances and goals as of 25 May 2026 ‡ National team caps and goals as of 22 June 2023

Sivert Heggheim Mannsverk (born 8 May 2002) is a Norwegian professional footballer who plays as a central midfielder for Czech First League club Sparta Prague.

== Club career ==
=== Sogndal ===
Mannsverk progressed through the youth ranks of Sogndal. He signed his first professional contract in February 2019 and made his senior debut on 7 April 2019 against Sandefjord in the Norwegian First Division. He quickly established himself as a regular midfielder for the team over the next two and a half seasons in Norway's second tier, making 55 appearances and scoring 6 goals across all competitions, including participation in the Eliteserien promotion play-offs. His performances attracted interest from larger clubs.

=== Molde ===
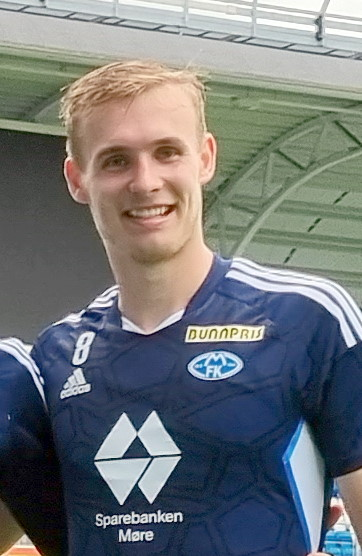
Mannsverk with Molde in 2022.

On 28 July 2021, Mannsverk signed for Eliteserien club Molde on a contract until 2025. He became a key player in Molde's midfield during the 2022 season, helping the team win the Eliteserien and Norwegian Cup double. Mannsverk scored the winning goal in the Cup Final against Bodø/Glimt on 1 May 2022. His performances earned him the Eliteserien Breakthrough Player of the Year award for 2022. He also featured regularly in European competitions for Molde, primarily the UEFA Europa Conference League. He continued as a starter in the 2023 season before transferring mid-campaign. In total, he made 86 appearances and scored 8 goals for Molde.

=== Ajax ===
On 1 September 2023, Mannsverk signed a five-year contract with Eredivisie club Ajax in the Netherlands. He made his debut on 17 September 2023 in an away match against FC Twente. However, his start at Ajax was significantly disrupted by a foot/ankle injury sustained shortly after his debut, which sidelined him for several months. Upon returning to fitness in early 2024, Mannsverk initially played matches for Jong Ajax in the Eerste Divisie to build match rhythm. He made limited appearances for the first team during the remainder of the 2023–24 season and the start of the 2024–25 season, totaling 18 appearances for the senior side before going out on loan.

==== Loan to Cardiff City ====
On 28 January 2025, seeking regular playing time after his injury recovery, Mannsverk joined EFL Championship club Cardiff City on loan until the end of the 2024–25 season. He made his debut for the club on 1 February 2025 against Leeds United and quickly became involved in the team's midfield. By mid-March 2025, he had made 10 league appearances for Cardiff City.

==== Loan to Sparta Prague ====
On 20 August 2025, Mannsverk joined Czech First League club Sparta Prague on a one-year loan deal with an option to make transfer permanent.

=== Sparta Prague ===
On 20 June 2026, Mannsverk signed a multi-year contract with Sparta Prague.

== International career ==
Mannsverk has represented Norway at youth international level from under-15 to under-21. He made one appearance at the 2023 UEFA European Under-21 Championship.

He was first called up to the senior Norway national team in November 2022 for friendlies.

== Career statistics ==
=== Club ===
As of match played 24 May 2026

Appearances and goals by club, season and competition
Club	Season	League			National cup		Continental		Other		Total	
Club	Season	Division	Apps	Goals	Apps	Goals	Apps	Goals	Apps	Goals	Apps	Goals
Sogndal	2019	Norwegian First Division	16	1	2	0	–		0 (Note: Appearances in the Eliteserien playoffs)	0	18	1
Sogndal	2020	Norwegian First Division	27	4	–		–		2	0	29	4
Sogndal	2021	Norwegian First Division	7	1	0	0	–		–		7	1
Sogndal	Total		51	6	2	0	0	0	2	0	55	6
Molde	2021	Eliteserien	14	0	2	0	2 (Note: Appearances in the UEFA Europa Conference League)	0	–		19	0
Molde	2022	Eliteserien	25	1	7	1	12	3	–		44	5
Molde	2023	Eliteserien	16	3	2	0	6 (Note: Appearances in UEFA Europa League)	0	–		24	3
Molde	Total		55	4	11	1	20	3	0	0	86	8
Ajax	2023–24	Eredivisie	13	0	0	0	3	0	—		16	0
Ajax	2024–25	Eredivisie	2	0	0	0	0	0	—		2	0
Ajax	2025–26	Eredivisie	0	0	0	0	0	0	—		0	0
Ajax	Total		15	0	0	0	3	0	0	0	18	0
Jong Ajax	2023–24	Eerste Divisie	3	0	—		—		—		3	0
Jong Ajax	2024–25	Eerste Divisie	3	0	—		—		—		3	0
Jong Ajax	Total		6	0	—		—		—		6	0
Cardiff City	2024–25	Championship	14	0	1	0	—		—		15	0
Sparta Prague (loan)	2025–26	Czech First League	19	0	2	0	6	0	—		27	0
Sparta Prague	2026–27	Czech First League	0	0	0	0	0	0	—		0	0
Career total			160	10	16	1	29	3	2	0	209	14

== Honours ==
Molde

- Eliteserien: 2022
- Norwegian Cup: 2021–22

Individual

- Norwegian First Division Player of the Year: 2020
- Eliteserien Young Player of the Year: 2022
