= Martin Bjørnbak =

Norwegian footballer (born 1992)

Personal information
- Date of birth: 22 March 1992 (age 34)
- Place of birth: Bjerka, Norway
- Height: 1.93 m (6 ft 4 in)
- Position: Defender

Team information
- Current team: Haugesund
- Number: 15

Senior career*
Years	Team	Apps	(Gls)
2008–2010	Stålkameratene	47	(0)
2011–2012	Bodø/Glimt	23	(1)
2012–2015	Haugesund	56	(1)
2015–2019	Bodø/Glimt	87	(10)
2019–2025	Molde	119	(4)
2025–	Haugesund	8	(0)

International career^{‡}
2009	Norway U17	3	(0)
2012–2014	Norway U21	7	(0)
- * Club domestic league appearances and goals as of 14 November 2026 ‡ National team caps and goals as of 20 March 2016

Martin Bjørnbak (born 22 March 1992) is a Norwegian professional footballer who plays as a defender for Eliteserien club Haugesund.

== Club career ==
Born in Mo i Rana, Bjørnbak started his career at local club Stålkameratene before he joined Bodø/Glimt ahead of the 2011 season. In his first season with Bodø/Glimt, Bjørnbak played 23 matches and scored one goal in the 1. divisjon, before transferring to Haugesund where he signed a four-year contract. Bjørnbak made his debut in the Tippeligaen in the match against Vålerenga on 25 March 2012, but was sent off after 33 minutes when he fouled Marcus Pedersen as the last man. Bjørnbak played a total of 17 matches for Haugesund in his first season.

On 17 January 2019, Bjørnbak signed a four-year contract with Molde. He got his Molde debut on 31 March 2019 in a 1–1 away draw against Sarpsborg 08.

== International career ==
Bjørnbak first appeared for Norway at international level when he played three matches for the under-17 team in 2009. In 2012, Bjørnbak again represented his country when he played ten matches for the under-21 team.

== Career statistics ==
=== Club ===
As of match played 21 September 2025

Appearances and goals by club, season and competition
Club	Season	League			National cup		Continental		Total	
Club	Season	Division	Apps	Goals	Apps	Goals	Apps	Goals	Apps	Goals
Bodø/Glimt	2011	1. divisjon	23	1	3	0	—		26	1
Haugesund	2012	Tippeligaen	17	0	5	1	—		22	1
Haugesund	2013	Tippeligaen	9	0	4	0	—		13	0
Haugesund	2014	Tippeligaen	12	0	3	1	2	0	17	1
Haugesund	2015	Tippeligaen	18	1	2	0	—		20	1
Haugesund	Total		56	1	14	2	2	0	72	3
Bodø/Glimt	2016	Tippeligaen	30	2	5	0	—		35	2
Bodø/Glimt	2017	OBOS-ligaen	28	4	1	0	—		29	4
Bodø/Glimt	2018	Eliteserien	29	4	5	2	—		34	6
Bodø/Glimt	Total		87	10	11	2	—		98	12
Molde	2019	Eliteserien	26	0	1	0	6	0	33	0
Molde	2020	Eliteserien	20	0	0	0	3	0	23	0
Molde	2021	Eliteserien	27	3	2	1	3	0	32	4
Molde	2022	Eliteserien	17	0	1	0	3	0	21	0
Molde	2023	Eliteserien	19	0	4	0	9	1	32	1
Molde	2024	Eliteserien	6	1	3	0	2	0	11	1
Molde	2025	Eliteserien	4	0	3	0	0	0	7	0
Molde	Total		119	4	14	1	26	1	159	6
Haugesund	2025	Eliteserien	1	0	0	0	—		1	0
Career total			286	16	42	5	28	1	356	22

== Honours ==
Molde

- Eliteserien: 2019, 2022
- Norwegian Cup: 2021–22, 2023
