= Eirik Ulland Andersen =

Norwegian footballer (born 1992)

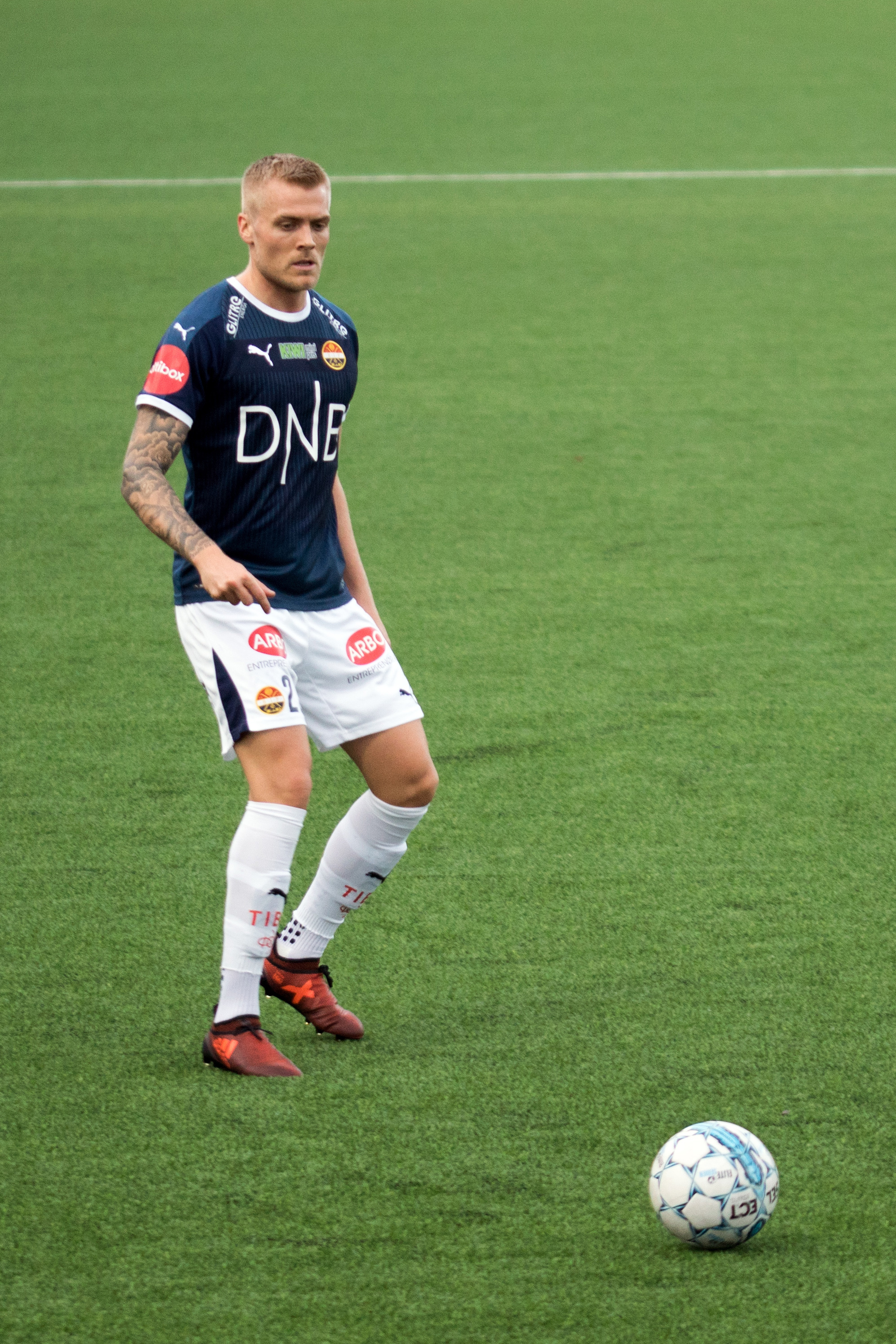
- Andersen in 2018

Personal information
- Full name: Eirik Ulland Andersen
- Date of birth: 21 September 1992 (age 34)
- Place of birth: Randers, Denmark
- Height: 1.81 m (5 ft 11 in)
- Position: Midfielder

Youth career
- –2009: Vard Haugesund

Senior career*
Years	Team	Apps	(Gls)
2010–2012	Haugesund	10	(0)
2012	→ Vard Haugesund (loan)	13	(6)
2012–2013	Vard Haugesund	20	(5)
2013–2016	Hødd	77	(27)
2016–2018	Strømsgodset	62	(20)
2019–2023	Molde	50	(12)
2023–2025	Strømsgodset	37	(5)
Total		269	(75)
- * Club domestic league appearances and goals

Eirik Ulland Andersen (born 21 September 1992) is a former Norwegian professional footballer who played as a midfielder.

== Career ==
=== Early career ===
Hailing from Haugesund, Andersen played for Vard Haugesund until he signed for FK Haugesund in 2010. He made his debut for Haugesund in Tippeligaen against Aalesund on 10 April 2011. Andersen played a total of 145 minutes in 10 matches for Haugesund in Tippeligaen in 2011, and scored five goals in three matches in the Norwegian Cup.

Andersen was loaned to his old club Vard Haugesund, playing in the 2. divisjon, until 31 July. On 1 August 2012, he joined Vard Haugesund on a permanent transfer. The club won promotion from the 2012 2. divisjon. He played for second-tier club Hødd from 2013 to 2016.

=== Strømsgodset ===
On 16 August 2016, he signed for Strømsgodset. He played 62 league games for the club and scored 20 goals.

=== Molde ===
Ulland Andersen signed for Molde on 16 January 2019. He signed a four-year contract with the club. He made his debut for Molde on 31 March 2019 in a 1–1 away draw against Sarpsborg 08. On 10 April 2019, he scored his first goal for the club on a penalty in Molde's 4–1 win against Vålerenga. On 1 May 2019, he scored his first hat-trick for the club in Molde's 5–0 win against Eide/Omegn in the Norwegian Cup first round. In the second half of the game, he was removed from the pitch with an injury to his Achilles tendon, which possibly rules him out for the rest of the season.

On 25 February 2021, he scored a brace in a 2–0 away win over TSG 1899 Hoffenheim in the 2020–21 UEFA Europa League round of 32, to qualify with his team to the next round.

=== Return to Strømsgodset ===
In August 2023, Ulland Andersen returned to his former club Strømsgodset on a contract until 31 December 2025.

He ended his career at the end of 2025-season due to injuries.

== Career statistics ==
=== Club ===
As of match played 20 October 2024

Appearances and goals by club, season and competition
Club	Season	League			National Cup		Europe		Other		Total	
Club	Season	Division	Apps	Goals	Apps	Goals	Apps	Goals	Apps	Goals	Apps	Goals
Haugesund	2011	Tippeligaen	10	0	3	5	—		—		13	5
Haugesund	Total		10	0	3	5	—	—	—	—	13	5
Vard Haugesund (loan)	2012	2. divisjon	13	6	2	1	—		—		15	7
Vard Haugesund	2012	2. divisjon	8	3	0	0	—		—		8	3
Vard Haugesund	2013	1. divisjon	12	2	2	2	—		—		14	4
Vard Haugesund	Total		33	11	4	3	—	—	—	—	37	13
Hødd	2013	1. divisjon	12	5	0	0	0	0	—		12	5
Hødd	2014	1. divisjon	20	7	1	0	—		—		21	7
Hødd	2015	1. divisjon	27	11	4	0	—		1 (Note: One appearance in the promotion play-offs)	0	32	11
Hødd	2016	1. divisjon	18	4	0	0	—		—		18	4
Hødd	Total		77	27	5	0	0	0	1	0	83	27
Strømsgodset	2016	Tippeligaen	8	3	2	0	0	0	—		10	3
Strømsgodset	2017	Eliteserien	26	11	3	0	—		—		29	11
Strømsgodset	2018	Eliteserien	28	6	7	3	—		—		35	9
Strømsgodset	Total		62	20	12	3	0	0	—	—	74	23
Molde	2019	Eliteserien	5	1	1	3	0	0	0	0	6	4
Molde	2020	Eliteserien	17	4	0	0	0	0	0	0	17	4
Molde	2021	Eliteserien	23	6	1	1	4	3	0	0	28	10
Molde	2022	Eliteserien	4	1	3	2	0	0	0	0	7	3
Molde	2023	Eliteserien	1	0	0	0	0	0	0	0	1	0
Molde	Total		50	12	5	6	4	3	0	0	59	21
Strømsgodset	2023	Eliteserien	14	2	0	0	0	0	—		14	2
Strømsgodset	2024	Eliteserien	23	3	2	2	—		—		25	5
Strømsgodset	Total		37	5	2	2	0	0	—	—	39	7
Career total			269	75	31	19	4	3	1	0	305	97

== Honours ==
=== Club ===
Molde

- Eliteserien: 2019
- Norwegian Cup: 2021–22

== Personal life ==
Ulland Andersen has a Danish father and was born in Randers, Denmark. He lived in Denmark until he was ten years old. He is the younger brother of the footballer Andreas Ulland Andersen.
