= Mathias Løvik =

Norwegian footballer (born 2003)

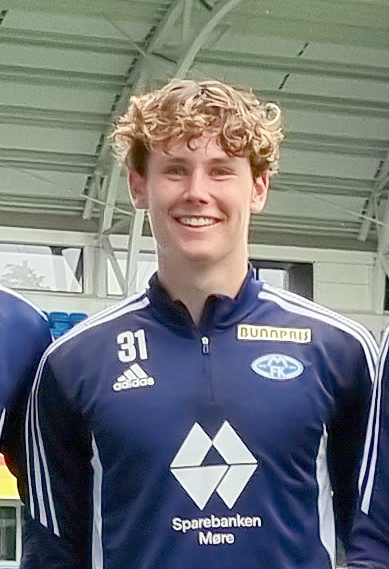

Personal information
- Full name: Mathias Johan Fjørtoft Løvik
- Date of birth: 6 December 2003 (age 22)
- Place of birth: Molde, Norway
- Height: 1.83 m (6 ft 0 in)
- Position: Left-back

Team information
- Current team: Molde
- Number: 8

Youth career
- –2021: Molde

Senior career*
Years	Team	Apps	(Gls)
2019–2021	Molde 2	15	(1)
2021–2025	Molde	62	(6)
2025–2026	Parma	15	(0)
2026	Trabzonspor	14	(0)
2026–	Molde	9	(0)

International career^{‡}
2019	Norway U16	11	(0)
2019–2020	Norway U17	6	(1)
2021	Norway U18	5	(0)
2022	Norway U19	4	(0)
2023	Norway U20	2	(0)
2023–2024	Norway U21	7	(0)
- * Club domestic league appearances and goals as of 18 October 2026 ‡ National team caps and goals as of 15 October 2024

Mathias Johan Fjørtoft Løvik (born 6 December 2003) is a Norwegian footballer who plays as a left-back for Norwegian Eliteserien club Molde.

== Club career ==
On 8 January 2025, Løvik signed a contract with Parma in Italy until 30 June 2029.

On 20 January 2026, Løvik moved to Trabzonspor in Turkey.

== Career statistics ==
=== Club ===
As of match played 18 July 2026

Club	Season	League			National Cup		Europe		Total	
Club	Season	Division	Apps	Goals	Apps	Goals	Apps	Goals	Apps	Goals
Molde 2	2019	3. divisjon	3	0	—		—		3	0
Molde 2	2020	3. divisjon	– (Note: The 2020 Norwegian Third Division was cancelled due to the COVID-19 pandemic in Norway)							
Molde 2	2021	3. divisjon	10	0	—		—		10	0
Molde 2	Total		13	0	—		—		13	0
Molde	2021	Eliteserien	0	0	2	0	1 (Note: Appearances in UEFA Europa Conference League)	0	3	0
Molde	2022	Eliteserien	13	0	4	1	5	0	22	1
Molde	2023	Eliteserien	25	2	7	0	7 (Note: One appearance in UEFA Champions League and six appearances in UEFA Europa League)	0	39	2
Molde	2024	Eliteserien	24	4	7	0	14 (Note: Six appearances in UEFA Europa League and eight appearances in the UEFA Conference League)	0	45	4
Molde	Total		62	6	20	1	27	0	109	7
Parma	2024–25	Serie A	6	0	—		—		6	0
Parma	2025–26	Serie A	9	0	3	0	—		12	0
Parma	Total		15	0	3	0	—		18	0
Trabzonspor	2025–26	Süper Lig	14	0	0	0	—		14	0
Molde	2026	Eliteserien	1	0	0	0	—		1	0
Career total			105	6	23	1	27	0	145	7

== Honours ==
=== Club ===
Molde

- Eliteserien: 2022
- Norwegian Cup: 2021–22, 2023

Trabzonspor

- Turkish Cup: 2025–26
