= Emil Breivik =

Norwegian footballer (born 2000)

Personal information
- Full name: Emil Varhaugvik Breivik
- Date of birth: 11 June 2000 (age 26)
- Height: 1.86 m (6 ft 1 in)
- Position: Midfielder

Team information
- Current team: Molde
- Number: 10

Youth career
- –2013: Gossen
- 2014–2019: Molde

Senior career*
Years	Team	Apps	(Gls)
2019–	Molde	155	(24)
2019–2020	→ Raufoss (loan)	40	(6)

International career
2021	Norway U21	1	(0)
- * Club domestic league appearances and goals as of 25 October 2026

Emil Varhaugvik Breivik (born 11 June 2000) is a Norwegian professional footballer who plays as a midfielder for Eliteserien club Molde.

== Club career ==
Breivik got his debut for Molde 2 on 3 October 2016 in a 2–5 loss away to Rosenborg 2. He made his debut for the first team on 1 May 2019 when he came on as a 62nd minute substitute in Molde's 5–0 win against Eide/Omegn in the Norwegian Cup first round.

Brevik spent the latter half of 2019 and entire 2020 on loan at Raufoss. Becoming a mainstay of the 1. divisjon team, he returned to Molde ahead of the 2021 season and made his debut as a starter in the Europa League Round of 16 game against Granada CF.

Ahead of the 2026 season, Breivik succeeded Magnus Wolff Eikrem in his role as Molde's team captain.

== International career ==
In August 2023, Breivik received his first call-up to the Norway senior national team by head coach Ståle Solbakken, for a friendly match against Jordan and a UEFA Euro 2024 qualifying match against Georgia.

== Career statistics ==
=== Club ===
As of match played 25 October 2026

Appearances and goals by club, season and competition
Club	Season	League			National Cup		Continental		Other		Total	
Club	Season	Division	Apps	Goals	Apps	Goals	Apps	Goals	Apps	Goals	Apps	Goals
Molde 2	2016	2. divisjon	2	0	—		—		—		2	0
Molde 2	2017	3. divisjon	21	1	—		—		—		21	1
Molde 2	2018	3. divisjon	25	2	—		—		—		25	2
Molde 2	2019	3. divisjon	13	2	—		—		—		13	2
Molde 2	2021	3. divisjon	1	0	—		—		—		13	2
Molde 2	Total		62	5	—	—	—	—	—	—	62	5
Molde	2019	Eliteserien	0	0	3	0	0	0	0	0	3	0
Molde	2021	Eliteserien	20	1	2	0	1	0	0	0	23	1
Molde	2022	Eliteserien	27	1	6	0	12	4	0	0	45	4
Molde	2023	Eliteserien	28	7	8	3	11	2	0	0	47	12
Molde	2024	Eliteserien	28	1	7	2	16	1	0	0	51	4
Molde	2025	Eliteserien	28	4	3	1	0	0	0	0	31	5
Molde	2026	Eliteserien	24	10	3	1	0	0	0	0	27	11
Molde	Total		155	24	32	7	40	7	—	—	204	31
Raufoss (loan)	2019	1. divisjon	11	1	0	0	—		—		11	1
Raufoss (loan)	2020	1. divisjon	29	5	0	0	—		—		29	5
Raufoss (loan)	Total		40	6	0	0	—	—	—	—	40	6
Career total			257	35	32	7	40	7	0	0	329	49

== Honours ==
Molde

- Eliteserien: 2022
- Norwegian Cup: 2021–22, 2023

Individual

- Norwegian First Division Player of the Month: September 2020
- Eliteserien Player of the Month: November 2025
