= David Datro Fofana =

Ivorian footballer (born 2002)

Personal information
- Full name: David Datro Fofana
- Date of birth: 22 December 2002 (age 23)
- Place of birth: Ouragahio, Ivory Coast
- Height: 1.81 m (5 ft 11 in)
- Position: Forward

Team information
- Current team: Servette
- Number: 27

Youth career
- 2018–2019: Abidjan City

Senior career*
Years	Team	Apps	(Gls)
2019–2021	Abidjan City		
2019–2020	→ AFAD (loan)		
2021–2022	Molde	42	(15)
2023–2026	Chelsea	3	(0)
2023–2024	→ Union Berlin (loan)	12	(1)
2024	→ Burnley (loan)	15	(4)
2024–2025	→ Göztepe (loan)	9	(2)
2025–2026	→ Fatih Karagümrük (loan)	13	(6)
2026	→ Strasbourg (loan)	5	(0)
2026–	Servette	5	(1)

International career^{‡}
2023	Ivory Coast U23	3	(1)
2019–2022	Ivory Coast	3	(0)
- * Club domestic league appearances and goals as of 28 September 2026 ‡ National team caps and goals as of 21:10, 28 September 2025 (UTC)

David Datro Fofana (born 22 December 2002) is an Ivorian professional footballer who plays as a forward for Swiss Super League club Servette.

== Club career ==
=== Early career ===
Fofana began his career in the Ivory Coast with Abidjan City, before joining AFAD on loan in 2019. He was heavily scouted by French, Belgian and Norwegian clubs. On 2 February 2021, Fofana signed a professional contract with Norwegian club Molde on a free transfer, signing for four years. He debuted with Molde in a 3–3 UEFA Europa League tie with Hoffenheim on 18 February 2021, scoring his side's third goal in the 74th minute.

=== Chelsea ===
On 28 December 2022, it was announced that Fofana would join English Premier League side Chelsea on 1 January 2023. On 8 January 2023, Fofana came off the bench to make his Chelsea debut in a 4–0 loss to Manchester City in the FA Cup.

==== Loan to Union Berlin ====
On 11 July 2023, Chelsea announced that Fofana would join Bundesliga side Union Berlin on a season-long loan. He was recalled by Chelsea on 11 January 2024.

==== Loan to Burnley ====
Two days after returning to Chelsea, Fofana was loaned to fellow Premier League club Burnley until the end of the season. On 3 February 2024, he scored his first goals for Burnley by netting a brace in a 2–2 draw against Fulham. On 21 May 2024, Burnley confirmed the player was returning to Chelsea.

==== Loan to Göztepe ====
On 13 September 2024, Fofana was loaned to newly promoted Turkish club Göztepe until the end of the 2024–25 season. On 3 February 2025, Chelsea recalled Fofana back from his loan due to an injury keeping him out for the remainder of the season.

==== Loan to Fatih Karagümrük ====
On 13 September 2025, Fofana was loaned to another newly promoted Süper Lig club Fatih Karagümrük until the end of the 2025–26 season.

==== Loan to Strasbourg ====
On 2 February 2026, Fofana signed for Ligue 1 club Strasbourg on loan for the remainder of the season.

=== Servette ===
On 31 August 2026, Fofana joined Swiss Super League club Servette on permanent basis, signing a contract until 2030.

== International career ==
Fofana made his international debut with the Ivory Coast national team in a 2–0 CHAN 2020 loss to Niger on 22 September 2019. On 22 March 2023, Fofana was the captain of the Ivory Coast's U23 national team in a friendly game against Morocco U23, which Ivory Coast won 3–2.

== Career statistics ==
=== Club ===
As of match played 22 April 2026

Appearances and goals by club, season and competition
Club	Season	League			National cup (Note: Includes Norwegian Cup, FA Cup, DFB-Pokal, Turkish Cup, Coupe de France)		League cup		Europe		Total	
Club	Season	Division	Apps	Goals	Apps	Goals	Apps	Goals	Apps	Goals	Apps	Goals
Molde	2021	Eliteserien	18	0	3	1	—		5 (Note: Three appearances and one goal in UEFA Europa League, two appearances in UEFA Europa Conference League)	1	26	2
Molde	2022	Eliteserien	24	15	5	3	—		10 (Note: Appearance(s) in UEFA (Europa) Conference League)	4	39	22
Molde	Total		42	15	8	4	—		15	5	65	24
Chelsea	2022–23	Premier League	3	0	1	0	—		0	0	4	0
Union Berlin (loan)	2023–24	Bundesliga	12	1	1	0	—		4 (Note: Appearances in UEFA Champions League)	1	17	2
Burnley (loan)	2023–24	Premier League	15	4	—		—		—		15	4
Göztepe (loan)	2024–25	Süper Lig	9	2	0	0	—		—		9	2
Fatih Karagümrük (loan)	2025–26	Süper Lig	13	6	2	2	—		—		15	8
Strasbourg (loan)	2025–26	Ligue 1	5	0	3	0	—		1	0	9	0
Career total			99	28	15	6	0	0	20	6	134	40

=== International ===
As of match played 19 November 2022

Appearances and goals by national team and year
National team	Year	Apps	Goals
Ivory Coast	2019	1	0
Ivory Coast	2022	2	0
Total		3	0

== Honours ==
Molde

- Eliteserien: 2022
- Norwegian Cup: 2021–22

Individual

- Eliteserien Young Player of the Month: July 2022
- Turkish Football Federation Fair Play Behavior Award of the Month October 2025
