= Magnus Grødem =

Norwegian footballer (born 1998)

Personal information
- Full name: Magnus Retsius Grødem
- Date of birth: 14 August 1998 (age 28)
- Place of birth: Bryne, Norway
- Height: 1.92 m (6 ft 3 1/2 in)
- Position: Midfielder

Team information
- Current team: KFUM
- Number: 28

Youth career
- –2015: Bryne

Senior career*
Years	Team	Apps	(Gls)
2015–2016	Bryne	31	(6)
2016–2019	Vålerenga	28	(4)
2017	→ Ullensaker/Kisa (loan)	10	(2)
2019	→ Ullensaker/Kisa (loan)	6	(2)
2019–2020	Vejle BK	1	(0)
2020	→ Sandnes Ulf (loan)	17	(9)
2020–2021	Sandnes Ulf	12	(5)
2021–2024	Molde	75	(15)
2024–2026	Yverdon-Sport	5	(0)
2025	→ Bryne (loan)	7	(3)
2026–	KFUM	11	(2)

International career^{‡}
2014	Norway U16	6	(0)
2015	Norway U17	8	(2)
2016	Norway U18	8	(2)
2017	Norway U19	2	(1)
2019	Norway U21	2	(0)
- * Club domestic league appearances and goals as of 23 July 2026 ‡ National team caps and goals as of 13:06, 27 August 2019 (UTC)

Magnus Retsius Grødem (born 14 August 1998) is a Norwegian footballer who plays as a midfielder for Eliteserien club KFUM.

== Club career ==
=== Early career ===
Born in 1998, Grødem started his football career with Bryne FK youth team.

=== Bryne FK ===
In 2015, Grødem was called up for Bryne FK first team. On 6 April 2015, Grødem made his Norwegian First Division debut against Nest-Sotra Fotball at Bryne Stadion, replacing Robert Undheim at the 87th minute by coach Gaute Larsen. On 5 July 2015, Grødem scored his first goal in senior team against Fredrikstad FK at the 90+2nd minute. Grødem played 32 games (including a game in Norwegian Football Cup) and scored six goals in league from April 2015 to August 2016.

=== Vålerenga Fotball ===
On 17 August 2016, Grødem moved to Vålerenga Fotball. On 7 November 2016, Grødem made his professional league debut in Tippeligaen against Viking FK at Viking Stadion. Grødem was prompted as a starter by coach Kjetil Rekdal and scored a goal at 90th minute. The game finished as 2-0 Vålerenga win.

=== Vejle BK ===
On 27 August 2019, Grødem joined Danish 1st Division club Vejle Boldklub on a contract until June 2023. He got shirt number 8.

=== Molde ===
On 6 May 2021, Molde announced the signing of Grødem to a three-year contract from Sandnes Ulf.

=== Yverdon-Sport ===
In January 2024, Grødem signed for Swiss Super League club Yverdon-Sport.

== Career statistics ==
=== Club ===
As of 3 May 2026

Club	Season	League			Cup		Continental		Total	
Club	Season	Division	Apps	Goals	Apps	Goals	Apps	Goals	Apps	Goals
Bryne	2015	OBOS-ligaen	15	2	2	0	–		17	2
Bryne	2016	OBOS-ligaen	16	4	2	2	–		18	6
Bryne	Total		31	6	4	2	–	–	35	8
Vålerenga	2016	Tippeligaen	1	1	0	0	–		1	1
Vålerenga	2017	Eliteserien	5	1	1	1	–		6	2
Vålerenga	2018	Eliteserien	21	1	5	0	–		26	1
Vålerenga	2019	Eliteserien	1	0	1	0	–		2	0
Vålerenga	Total		28	3	7	1	–	–	35	4
Ullensaker/Kisa (loan)	2017	OBOS-ligaen	10	2	0	0	–		10	2
Ullensaker/Kisa (loan)	2019	OBOS-ligaen	6	2	1	0	–		7	2
Ullensaker/Kisa (loan)	Total		16	4	1	0	–	–	17	4
Vejle	2019–20	NordicBet Liga	1	0	0	0	–		1	0
Vejle	Total		1	0	0	0	–	–	1	0
Sandnes Ulf	2020	OBOS-ligaen	29	14	0	0	–		29	14
Sandnes Ulf	Total		29	14	0	0	–	–	29	14
Molde	2021	Eliteserien	19	1	3	4	3	0	25	5
Molde	2022	Eliteserien	27	7	5	3	11	0	43	10
Molde	2023	Eliteserien	29	7	7	5	7	0	43	12
Molde	Total		75	15	15	12	21	0	111	27
Yverdon-Sport	2023–24	Swiss Super League	0	0	0	0	0	0	0	0
Yverdon-Sport	2024–25	Swiss Super League	5	0	0	0	0	0	5	0
Yverdon-Sport	2025–26	Swiss Challenge League	0	0	1	0	0	0	1	0
Yverdon-Sport	Total		5	0	1	0	0	0	6	0
Bryne (loan)	2025	Eliteserien	7	3	0	0	–		7	3
KFUM	2026	Eliteserien	6	2	3	0	–		9	3
Career total			198	47	31	15	21	0	250	62

== Honours ==
- Eliteserien: 2022
- Norwegian Cup: 2021–22, 2023
