= Birk Risa =

Norwegian footballer (born 1998)

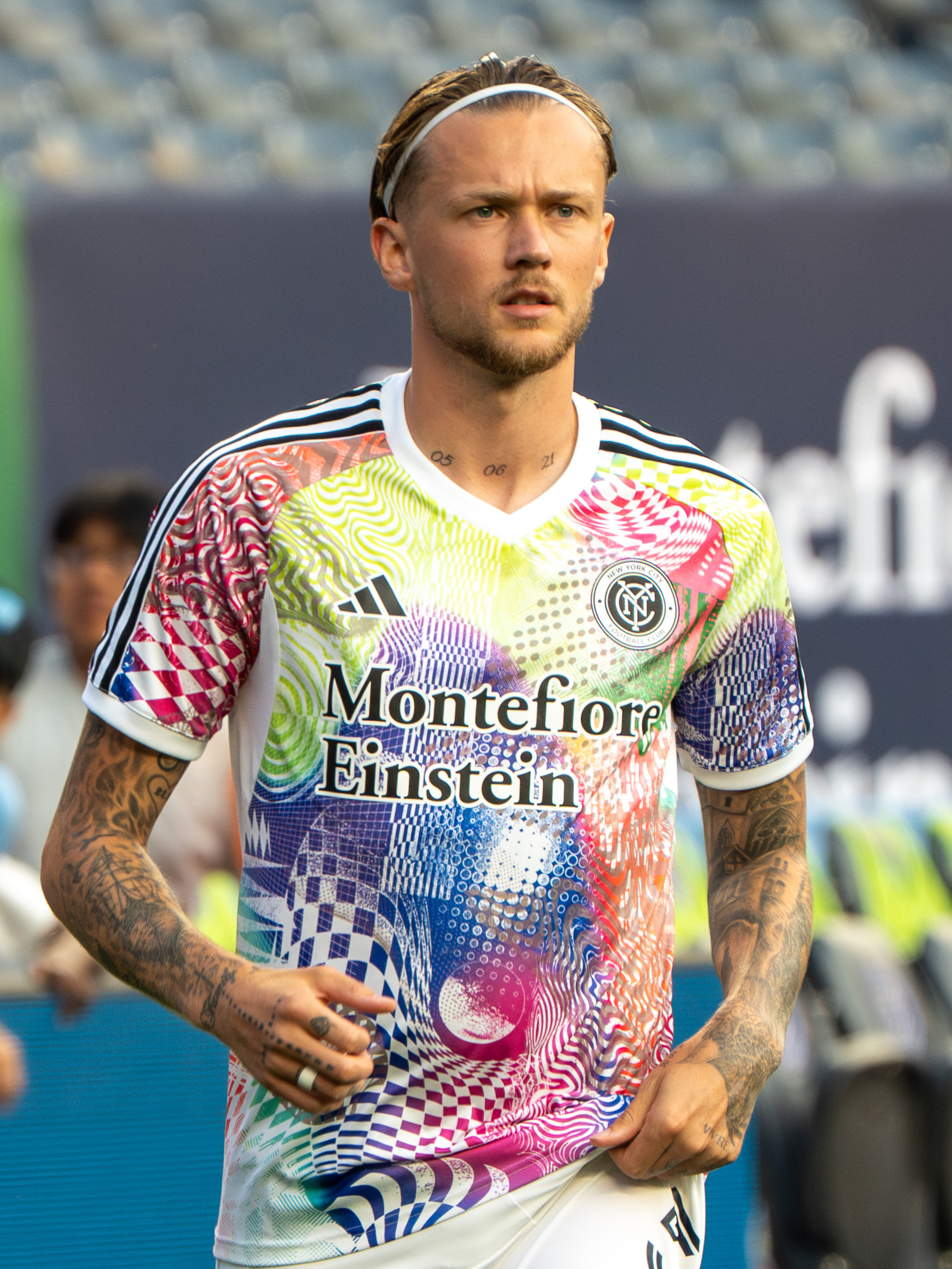
- Risa with New York City FC in 2025

Personal information
- Date of birth: 13 February 1998 (age 28)
- Place of birth: Stavanger, Norway
- Height: 1.88 m (6 ft 2 in)
- Positions: Left-back; centre back

Team information
- Current team: Molde
- Number: 33

Youth career
- 2005–2012: Sola FK
- 2013–2014: Sandnes Ulf
- 2014–2017: 1. FC Köln

Senior career*
| Years | Team | Apps | (Gls) |
| 2017–2018 | 1. FC Köln II | 17 | (3) |
| 2017–2018 | 1. FC Köln | 2 | (0) |
| 2018–2020 | Odd | 75 | (4) |
| 2020–2023 | Molde | 63 | (3) |
| 2023–2025 | New York City FC | 57 | (0) |
| 2025– | Molde | 15 | (0) |

International career^{‡}
| 2014 | Norway U16 | 1 | (0) |
| 2015 | Norway U17 | 3 | (1) |
| 2016–2017 | Norway U19 | 6 | (5) |
| 2017–2020 | Norway U21 | 23 | (6) |
- * Club domestic league appearances and goals as of 1 December 2025 ‡ National team caps and goals as of 9 September 2020

Birk Risa (born 13 February 1998) is a Norwegian professional footballer who plays as a defender for Molde.

== Club career ==
=== 1. FC Köln ===
Risa joined 1. FC Köln's youth ranks in 2014 from Sandnes Ulf. He made his Bundesliga debut for 1. FC Köln on 10 December 2017 against SC Freiburg.

=== Odd ===
In March 2018, he left 1. FC Köln to return to Norway, joining Odd on a contract until December 2021. Despite his debut in Bundesliga in 2017, Risa signed for Odds BK to play regularly in the first team.

=== Molde ===
On 6 October 2020, Risa signed a contract with Molde until 2023. He made his debut on 25 October in a 2–1 win over Strømsgodset. His European debut followed on 26 November, as he started at left-back in the 3–0 home loss to Arsenal in the UEFA Europa League group stage. Molde would manage to knock out Hoffenheim in the round of 32, but eventually lost on aggregate to Granada in the round of 16. Risa made five appearances for Molde in the 2020–21 European campaign.

Risa scored his first goal for Molde on 16 June 2021 in a 4–1 win over Sarpsborg 08, after having come on as a substitute for Kristoffer Haugen in the 80th minute and scoring in injury time.

== Career statistics ==
=== Club ===
As of match played 31 August 2025

Appearances and goals by club, season and competition
| Club | Season | League | | | National Cup | | Continental | | Other | | Total | |
| Club | Season | Division | Apps | Goals | Apps | Goals | Apps | Goals | Apps | Goals | Apps | Goals |
|---|---|---|---|---|---|---|---|---|---|---|---|---|
| 1. FC Köln | 2017–18 | Bundesliga | 2 | 0 | 0 | 0 | — | | — | | 2 | 0 |
| Odd | 2018 | Eliteserien | 26 | 1 | 3 | 1 | — | | — | | 29 | 2 |
| Odd | 2019 | Eliteserien | 29 | 2 | 5 | 0 | — | | — | | 34 | 2 |
| Odd | 2020 | Eliteserien | 20 | 1 | 0 | 0 | — | | — | | 20 | 1 |
| Odd | Total | | 75 | 4 | 8 | 1 | — | | — | | 83 | 5 |
| Molde | 2020 | Eliteserien | 7 | 0 | 0 | 0 | 5 | 0 | — | | 10 | 0 |
| Molde | 2021 | Eliteserien | 17 | 3 | 3 | 0 | 4 | 0 | — | | 24 | 3 |
| Molde | 2022 | Eliteserien | 26 | 0 | 6 | 0 | 10 | 0 | — | | 42 | 0 |
| Molde | 2023 | Eliteserien | 13 | 0 | 4 | 0 | 0 | 0 | — | | 17 | 0 |
| Molde | Total | | 63 | 3 | 13 | 0 | 19 | 0 | — | | 95 | 3 |
| New York City FC | 2023 | MLS | 10 | 0 | — | | — | | — | | 10 | 0 |
| New York City FC | 2024 | MLS | 30 | 0 | — | | — | | 5 | 0 | 35 | 0 |
| New York City FC | 2025 | MLS | 17 | 0 | — | | — | | 1 | 0 | 18 | 0 |
| New York City FC | Total | | 57 | 0 | — | | — | | 6 | 0 | 63 | 0 |
| Molde | 2025 | Eliteserien | 6 | 0 | 0 | 0 | — | | — | | 6 | 0 |
| Career total | | | 203 | 7 | 21 | 1 | 19 | 0 | 6 | 0 | 249 | 8 |

== Honours ==
Molde

- Eliteserien: 2022
- Norwegian Cup: 2021–22
