= 2026 Molde FK season =

Molde
2026 season
- Chairman: Odd Ivar Moen
- Manager: Martin Falk (Interim) (until 24 May); Sindre Tjelmeland (from 24 May)
- Stadium: Aker Stadion
- Eliteserien: Preseason
- 2025–26 Cup: Fourth Round
- 2026–27 Cup: Third round
Home colours	Away colours

The 2026 season was Molde's 19th consecutive year in Eliteserien, and their 50th season in the top flight of Norwegian football.

== Season events ==
On 21 December, Molde announced the appointment of Sindre Tjelmeland as their new head coach, with Tjelmeland signing a Four-Year contract commencing on 24 May 2026 once his contract as Lech Poznań's Assistant Coach expires. In the same statement, Molde announced that Martin Falk would be their new assistant coach, with Falk being interim head coach until Tjelmeland joins the club.

On 10 January, Molde announced the signing of Fredrik Kristensen Dahl from Strømsgodset, on a contract until the end of the 2028 season.

On 15 January, Molde announced the signing of Sivert Sira Hansen from Start, on a contract until the end of the 2029 season.

On 20 January, Molde announced the signing of Mads Kikkenborg from Anderlecht, on a contract until the end of the 2028 season. Later the same day, Molde announced that Alwande Roaldsøy had left the club in order to sign for Sparta Rotterdam.

On 23 January, Molde announced the signing of Viktor Bender from Odense Boldklub, on a contract until the end of the 2027 season.

On 9 February, Molde announced the signing of Andreas Tveiten from Brattvåg to a three-year contract, whilst also loaning him back to Brattvåg for the first half of the season.

On 27 February, Molde announced the signing of Trent Koné-Doherty from Liverpool on a contract until the end of 2029.

On 2 March, Molde announced the signing of Vebjørn Hoff from Lillestrøm on a contract until the end of 2026.

On 4 March, Molde announced that Emil Breivik would be the club's new captain, with Eirik Haugan, Fredrik Gulbrandsen and Mats Møller Dæhli would acting as vice captains. Later the same day, Molde announced the permanent signing of Jalal Abdullai, who'd spent the previous season on loan with the club, from Elfsborg on a contract until the end of 2029.

On 7 March, Magnus Fjørtoft Løvik extended his contract until the end of the season, and joined Træff on loan for the season.

On 10 March, Molde announced that Daniel Daga would not be part of any future match squads whilst his legal case was on going.

On 18 March, Emil Breivik extended his contract with Molde until the end of the 2029 season.

On 30 March, Molde announced that Kristian Eriksen had left the club to sign for Brann.

On 31 March, Eirik Haugan extended his contract with Molde until the end of the 2029 season.

On 4 April, Mads Myklebust joined Strømsgodset on a season-long loan deal, with the option to terminate the loan in the summer.

On 11 April, Peder Hoel Lervik joined Åsane on loan until 25 April.

On 14 April, Mads Myklebust was recalled from his season-long loan with Strømsgodset after Mads Kikkenborg was ruled out with a torn Achilles.

On 25 June, Molde announced the departure of Fredrik Gulbrandsen.

On 26 June, Molde announced that Oskar Spiten-Nysæter had signed a one-year extension to his contract, keeping him at the club until the end of the 2031 season.

On 28 June, Molde announced that Casper Øyvann had left the club in order to return to Tromsø.

On 2 July, Molde announced that Igor Gosik had signed his first professional contract with the club, until the summer of 2029.

On 3 July, Molde announced the signing of Seydina Diop from Ranheim, on a contract until June 2030.

On 13 July, Molde announced the signing of Mathias Løvik from Trabzonspor, on a contract until the end of the 2030 season.

On 25 July, Blerton Isufi joined HamKam on loan for the remainder of the season.

On 28 July, Isak Amundsen left Molde to sign permanently for Fredrikstad.

On 29 July, Molde announced that Sondre Granaas had extended his contract with the club until the summer of 2029.

On 31 July, Jonathan Fugelsnes signed his first contract with the club, until the summer of 2028, whilst Igor Gosik joined Strømsgodset for the remainder of the season.

On 1 August, Molde announced the signing of Niklas Ødegård from Kristiansund, on a contract until the summer of 2030.

On 4 August, Molde announced that Valdemar Lund had returned to Vejle on loan until the end of 2026.

On 10 August, Molde announced that Jacob Steen Christensen had joined Sønderjyske on loan until the summer of 2027.

On 13 August, Molde announced that Igor Gosik had returned to the club after his loan deal with Strømsgodset was ended early.

On 18 August, Molde announced that Mads Enggård had left the club to sign permanently for Mjällby.

On 20 August, Molde announced that they had extended their contract with Daniel Daga until the summer of 2031.

On 30 August, Molde announced the signing of Sander Kilen from Kristiansund and Kristian Lonebu from Aalesund, both on contracts until the end of the 2030 season.

== Squad ==
As of match played 8 November 2026

No.	Name	Nationality	Position	Date of birth (age)	Signed from	Signed in	Contract ends	Apps.	Goals
Goalkeepers
1	Mads Kikkenborg	(Denmark)	GK	7 October 1999 (age 27)	Anderlecht	2026	2028	5	0
12	Peder Hoel Lervik	(Norway)	GK	24 April 2005 (age 21)	Academy	2021	2027	3	0
22	Albert Posiadała	(Poland)	GK	25 February 2003 (age 23)	Radomiak Radom	2024	2027	60	0
32	Mads Myklebust	(Norway)	GK	31 July 2007 (age 19)	Academy	2024		0	0
Defenders
4	Sivert Sira Hansen	(Norway)	DF	30 May 2002 (age 24)	Start	2026	2029	21	0
8	Mathias Løvik	(Norway)	DF	6 December 2003 (age 22)	Trabzonspor	2026	2030	121	7
18	Halldor Stenevik	(Norway)	DF	2 February 2000 (age 26)	Strømsgodset	2024	2027	93	6
19	Eirik Haugan (vc)	(Norway)	DF	27 August 1997 (age 29)	Östersunds	2022	2029	173	8
25	Martin Linnes	(Norway)	DF	20 September 1991 (age 35)	Unattached	2021	2025	310	30
26	Samukele Kabini	(South Africa)	DF	15 March 2004 (age 22)	TS Galaxy	2025	2028	45	3
27	Fredrik Kristensen Dahl	(Norway)	DF	30 January 1999 (age 27)	Strømsgodset	2026	2028	9	0
33	Birk Risa	(Norway)	DF	13 February 1998 (age 28)	New York City FC	2025	2028	138	3
45	Noah Ljøen Bye	(Norway)	DF	14 March 2008 (age 18)	Academy	2026		1	0
49	Daniel Nakken	(Norway)	DF	26 May 2008 (age 18)	Academy	2025		1	0
Midfielders
5	Eirik Hestad	(Norway)	MF	26 June 1995 (age 31)	Unattached	2023	2027	329	59
6	Niklas Ødegård	(Norway)	MF	29 March 2004 (age 22)	Kristiansund	2026	2030	62	9
10	Emil Breivik (c)	(Norway)	MF	11 June 2000 (age 26)	Academy	2014	2029	235	34
15	Vebjørn Hoff	(Norway)	MF	13 February 1996 (age 30)	Lillestrøm	2026	2026	13	1
17	Mats Møller Dæhli (vc)	(Norway)	MF	2 March 1995 (age 31)	1. FC Nürnberg	2024	2027	107	1
23	Sondre Granaas	(Norway)	MF	30 August 2006 (age 20)	Mjøndalen	2024	2029	70	11
28	Viktor Bender	(Denmark)	MF	12 July 2007 (age 19)	Odense Boldklub	2026	2027	16	2
30	Daniel Daga	(Nigeria)	MF	10 January 2007 (age 19)	Enyimba	2025	2031	33	5
55	Ulrik Langlie Skrede	(Norway)	MF	12 January 2010 (age 16)	Academy	2026		1	0
Forwards
9	Jalal Abdullai	(Ghana)	FW	5 January 2005 (age 21)	IF Elfsborg	2026	2029	44	15
11	Caleb Zady Sery	(Ivory Coast)	FW	20 December 1999 (age 26)	Vojvodina	2025		43	8
16	Sander Kilen	(Norway)	FW	30 May 2005 (age 21)	Kristiansund	2026	2030	9	5
20	Kristian Lonebu	(Norway)	FW	18 February 2006 (age 20)	Aalesund	2026	2030	8	10
21	Oskar Spiten-Nysæter	(Norway)	FW	29 August 2007 (age 19)	Stabæk	2025	2031	34	6
24	Trent Koné-Doherty	(Republic of Ireland)	FW	30 June 2006 (age 20)	Liverpool	2026	2029	24	10
29	Seydina Diop	(Senegal)	FW	10 May 2005 (age 21)	Ranheim	2026	2030	3	1
44	Igor Gosik	(Norway)	FW	7 February 2008 (age 18)	Academy	2025	2029	4	0
Molde II
35	William Fraser	(Norway)	GK	26 January 2002 (age 24)	Academy	2021		0	0
38	Magnus Solheim	(Norway)	FW	3 March 2005 (age 21)	Academy	2022		0	0
40	Martin Kjørsvik	(Norway)	FW	17 January 2003 (age 23)	Academy	2021		1	0
41	Sindre Heggstad	(Norway)	DF	6 April 2003 (age 23)	Academy	2021		0	0
42	Jesper Myklebust	(Norway)	FW	5 June 2003 (age 23)	Academy	2022		0	0
43	Jonathan Fugelsnes	(Norway)	MF	26 November 2007 (age 18)	Academy	2026	2028	1	0
52	Fredrik Nyheim	(Norway)	DF	2 April 2005 (age 21)	Academy	2021		0	0
55	Emil Silseth	(Norway)	MF	15 September 2005 (age 21)	Academy	2022		0	0
56	Faveur Ndayizeye	(Norway)	FW	24 April 2008 (age 18)	Academy	2025		1	0
	Adrian Viken	(Norway)	DF	14 July 2005 (age 21)	Academy	2021		0	0
	Vegard Myklebust	(Norway)	MF	2 February 2005 (age 21)	Academy	2022		0	0
Out on loan
14	Jacob Steen Christensen	(Denmark)	MF	25 June 2001 (age 25)	FC Köln	2025	2028	17	0
31	Blerton Isufi	(Kosovo)	MF	14 February 2006 (age 20)	Moss	2025	2029	4	0
34	Mathias Mork	(Norway)	MF	27 July 2007 (age 19)	Academy	2025	2029	3	0
	Valdemar Lund	(Denmark)	DF	28 May 2003 (age 23)	Copenhagen	2024	2027	50	0
	Andreas Tveiten	(Norway)	MF	19 October 2005 (age 21)	Brattvåg	2026	2028	0	0
	Magnus Fjørtoft Løvik	(Norway)	FW	7 October 2005 (age 21)	Academy	2022	2026	0	0
Players who left club during season
3	Casper Øyvann	(Norway)	DF	7 December 1999 (age 26)	Tromsø	2023	2026	65	0
6	Isak Amundsen	(Norway)	DF	14 October 1999 (age 27)	Bodø/Glimt	2024	2027	68	0
8	Fredrik Gulbrandsen (vc)	(Norway)	FW	10 September 1992 (age 34)	Unattached	2023		128	47
20	Kristian Eriksen	(Norway)	FW	18 July 1995 (age 31)	HamKam	2022	2026	143	36
20	Mads Enggård	(Denmark)	MF	20 January 2004 (age 22)	Randers	2024	2028	41	0
28	Alwande Roaldsøy	(Norway)	MF	9 June 2004 (age 22)	Atalanta	2024	2026	19	1

== Transfers ==
=== In ===
Date	Position	Nationality	Name	From	Fee	Ref.
10 January 2026	DF	(Norway)	Fredrik Kristensen Dahl	Strømsgodset	Undisclosed	
15 January 2026	DF	(Norway)	Sivert Sira Hansen	Start	Undisclosed	
20 January 2026	GK	(Denmark)	Mads Kikkenborg	Anderlecht	Undisclosed	
23 January 2026	MF	(Denmark)	Viktor Bender	Odense Boldklub	Undisclosed	
9 February 2026	MF	(Norway)	Andreas Tveiten	Brattvåg	Undisclosed	
27 February 2026	FW	(Republic of Ireland)	Trent Koné-Doherty	Liverpool	Undisclosed	
2 March 2026	MF	(Norway)	Vebjørn Hoff	Lillestrøm	Undisclosed	
4 March 2026	FW	(Ghana)	Jalal Abdullai	Elfsborg	Undisclosed	
3 July 2026	FW	(Senegal)	Seydina Diop	Ranheim	Undisclosed	
13 July 2026	DF	(Norway)	Mathias Løvik	Trabzonspor	Undisclosed	
1 August 2026	MF	(Norway)	Niklas Ødegård	Kristiansund	Undisclosed	
30 August 2026	FW	(Norway)	Sander Kilen	Kristiansund	Undisclosed	
30 August 2026	FW	(Norway)	Kristian Lonebu	Aalesund	Undisclosed	

=== Out ===
Date	Position	Nationality	Name	To	Fee	Ref.
20 January 2026	MF	(Norway)	Alwande Roaldsøy	Sparta Rotterdam	Undisclosed	
30 March 2026	MF	(Norway)	Kristian Eriksen	Brann	Undisclosed	
28 June 2026	DF	(Norway)	Casper Øyvann	Tromsø	Undisclosed	
28 July 2026	DF	(Norway)	Isak Amundsen	Fredrikstad	Undisclosed	
18 August 2026	MF	(Denmark)	Mads Enggård	Mjällby	Undisclosed	

=== Loans out ===
Date from	Position	Nationality	Name	To	Date to	Ref.
16 August 2025	GK	(Poland)	Albert Posiadała	Samsunspor	Mid January 2026	
18 August 2025	DF	(Denmark)	Valdemar Lund	Vejle	30 June 2026	
19 August 2025	MF	(Denmark)	Mads Enggård	Vejle	30 June 2026	
9 February 2026	MF	(Norway)	Andreas Tveiten	Brattvåg	30 June 2026	
7 March 2026	FW	(Norway)	Magnus Fjørtoft Løvik	Træff	31 December 2026	
19 March 2026	MF	(Norway)	Mathias Mork	Træff	31 December 2026	
4 April 2026	GK	(Norway)	Mads Myklebust	Strømsgodset	14 April 2026	
11 April 2026	GK	(Norway)	Peder Hoel Lervik	Åsane	25 April 2026	
25 July 2026	MF	(Kosovo)	Blerton Isufi	HamKam	31 December 2026	
31 July 2026	FW	(Norway)	Igor Gosik	Strømsgodset	13 August 2026	
4 August 2026	DF	(Denmark)	Valdemar Lund	Vejle	31 December 2026	
10 August 2026	MF	(Denmark)	Jacob Steen Christensen	Sønderjyske	30 June 2026	

=== Released ===
Date	Position	Nationality	Name	Joined	Date	Ref.
25 June 2026	FW	(Norway)	Fredrik Gulbrandsen	Lillestrøm	29 June 2026	

== Friendlies ==
2 February 2026	Molde	4-0	Træff	Molde
CET (UTC+1)		Report		Stadium: Aker Stadion

6 February 2026	Molde	0-0	Kristiansund	Molde
CET (UTC+1)		Report		Stadium: Aker Stadion

12 February 2026	Molde	0-1	Metalist 1925 Kharkiv	Marbella, Spain
16:00 CET (UTC+1)	Gosik (yellow card) 84'	Report	Zabërgja 44'; Kalyuzhnyi (yellow card) 75'; Antyukh (yellow card) 78'; Kohut (yellow card) 81'; Martynyuk (yellow card) 87'

15 February 2026	Molde	2-1	Brattvåg	Marbella, Spain
16:00 CET (UTC+1)	Gosik 40'; 88'	Report	56'

17 February 2026	Molde	2-2	Viking	Marbella, Spain
16:00 CET (UTC+1)	61'; 66'	Report	Visted 28'; Bærtelsen 54'

27 February 2026	Molde	4-1	Aalesund	Molde
15:00 CET (UTC+1)		Report		Stadium: Aker Stadion

21 June 2026	Molde	5-1	KFUM Oslo	Molde
18:00 CEST (UTC+2)	Spiten-Nysæter 15'; Breivik 23'; Hansen 37'; Isufi 72'; Sery 84'	Report	Hoseth 55'	Stadium: Aker Stadion

28 June 2026	Bodø/Glimt	4-1	Molde	Bodø
14:00 CEST (UTC+2)		Report		Stadium: Aspmyra Stadion

5 July 2026	Rosenborg	2-1	Molde	Trondheim
15:30 CEST (UTC+2)	12'; (yellow card) 31'; (yellow card) 41'; (yellow card) 56'; (yellow card) 71'; (yellow card) 73'; 90+7'	Report	(yellow card) 42'; Stenevik 48'; (yellow card) 64'; (yellow card) 85'	Stadium: Lerkendal Stadium

== Competitions ==
=== Overview ===
Competition	First match	Last match	Starting round	Final position	Record							
Competition	First match	Last match	Starting round	Final position	Pld	W	D	L	GF	GA	GD	Win %
Eliteserien	14 March 2026		Matchday 1		27	13	5	9	66	48	+18	48.15
2025–26 Cup	See 2025 Season	5 March 2026	Fourth round	Fourth round	1	0	0	1	1	2	−1	0.00
2026–27 Cup	September 2026		Third round		3	3	0	0	20	1	+19	100.00
Total					31	16	5	10	87	51	+36	51.61

Last updated: 8 November 2026
Source: Competitions

=== Eliteserien ===
==== Results summary ====
Overall								Home						Away					
Pld	W	D	L	GF	GA	GD	Pts	W	D	L	GF	GA	GD	W	D	L	GF	GA	GD
27	13	5	9	66	48	+18	44	9	1	4	37	19	+18	4	4	5	29	29	0

Last updated: 8 November 2026.
Source: see below

==== Results by match ====
Match	1	2	3	4	5	6	7	8	9	10	11	13	14	15	16	17	18	19	20	21	22	23	24	12	25	26	27
Ground	H	A	H	H	A	H	A	A	H	A	H	A	H	A	H	A	H	A	H	A	H	A	H	H	A	A	H
Result	W	L	L	W	D	W	W	L	W	L	W	D	L	W	D	L	W	W	W	W	L	D	W	W	L	D	L
Position	4	9	9	6	4	4	5	5	5	5	5	5	5	5	5	5	4	4	4	3	4	4	3	3	3	3	
Points	3	3	3	6	7	10	13	13	16	16	19	20	20	23	24	24	27	30	33	36	36	37	40	43	43	44	44

Updated to match(es) played on 8 November 2026. Source: see below
A = Away; H = Home; W = Win; D = Draw; L = Loss

==== Results ====
14 March 2026 1	Molde	2–0	Rosenborg	Molde
18:00 CET (UTC+1)	Breivik 31'; Hestad (yellow card) 31' (goal) 57'	Report	Witry (yellow card) 5'; Svensson (yellow card) 45+4'; Ďuriš (yellow card) 60'; Chiakha (yellow card) 73'	Stadium: Aker Stadion; Attendance: 9,630; Referee: Tore Hansen

21 March 2026 2	Viking	4–1	Molde	Stavanger
18:00 CET (UTC+1)	Fuglestad 7', 61'; Heggheim 25', 31' (yellow card) 79'; Askildsen (yellow card) 35'; Falchener (yellow card) 64'	Report	Breivik 9'; Kabini (yellow card) 54' (yellow-red card) 90+3'	Stadium: Viking Stadion; Attendance: 15,503; Referee: Sivert Amland

6 April 2026 3	Molde	0–1	Lillestrøm	Molde
17:00 CEST (UTC+2)	Stenevik (yellow card) 42'	Report	Ibrahimaj (yellow card) 45+3'; Olsen 49'; Dahlberg (yellow card) 90+1'	Stadium: Aker Stadion; Attendance: 5,749; Referee: Svein Tore Sinnes

12 April 2026 4	Molde	4–1	HamKam	Molde
17:00 CEST (UTC+2)	Breivik 3', 48'; Abdullai 14'; Sjølstad 37' (o.g.); Kabini (red card) 78'; Hestad (yellow card) 81'; Granaas (yellow card) 82'; Gulbrandsen (yellow card) 90+1'	Report	Hoffmann (yellow card) 11'; Udahl 58'; Simenstad (yellow card) 76'; Ekeroth (yellow card) 81'	Stadium: Aker Stadion; Attendance: 5,331; Referee: Marius Lien

19 April 2026 5	Start	1–1	Molde	Kristiansand
19:15 CEST (UTC+2)	Cornelius 22'; Toure (yellow card) 24'	Report	Hestad (yellow card) 61'; Breivik 64'; Risa (yellow card) 76'	Stadium: Sør Arena; Attendance: 5,870; Referee: Sivert Amland

26 April 2026 6	Molde	5–1	Vålerenga	Molde
14:30 CEST (UTC+2)	Gulbrandsen 21', 55' (yellow card) 38'; Breivik 51'; Hestad 57'; Granaas 86'	Report	Haren 45+1'; Sjåtil (yellow card) 49'	Stadium: Aker Stadion; Attendance: 5,461; Referee: Christian Moen

4 May 2026 7	Bodø/Glimt	0–1	Molde	Bodø
19:00 CEST (UTC+2)		Report	Gulbrandsen 36'; Posiadała (yellow card) 41'; Granaas (yellow card) 56'; Hestad (yellow card) 90+6'	Stadium: Aspmyra Stadion; Attendance: 5,876; Referee: Rohit Saggi

10 May 2026 8	Tromsø	2–0	Molde	Tromsø
17:00 CEST (UTC+2)	Edvardsson (yellow card) 27'; Vådebu 81'; Warneryd (yellow card) 90+7'; Nyhammer 90+8'	Report	Posiadała (yellow card) 59'; Breivik (yellow card) 87'	Stadium: Romssa Arena; Attendance: 5,011; Referee: Kristoffer Hagenes

16 May 2026 9	Molde	1–0	Kristiansund	Molde
16:00 CEST (UTC+2)	Hoff 42'; Kabini (yellow card) 74'	Report	Ødegård (yellow card) 16'; Alvheim (yellow card) 77'	Stadium: Aker Stadion; Attendance: 9,198; Referee: Sigurd Kringstad

25 May 2026 10	Sarpsborg 08	2–1	Molde	Sarpsborg
17:00 CEST (UTC+2)	Karlsbakk 5' (pen.); Utvik (yellow card) 27'; Hiim 59'	Report	Hestad (yellow card) 10' (goal) 45'	Stadium: Sarpsborg Stadion; Attendance: 7,604; Referee: Ola Hobber Nilsen

30 May 2026 11	Molde	2–1	Sandefjord	Molde
16:00 CEST (UTC+2)	Gulbrandsen 6'; Hestad 57'; Amundsen (yellow card) 90+4'	Report	Vester (yellow card) 66'; Holm Mathisen 89'; Apetorgbor (yellow card) 90+3'; Hadaya (yellow card) 90+6'	Stadium: Aker Stadion; Attendance: 5,112; Referee: Jorgen Haugen

11 July 2026 13	Aalesund	2–2	Molde	Ålesund
16:00 CEST (UTC+2)	Osenbroch 14'; Kjelsen (yellow card) 90+1'; Christensen 90+6'	Report	Spiten-Nysæter 18' (yellow card) 63'; Hestad 31'; Møller Dæhli (yellow card) 45'; Abdullai (yellow card) 80'	Stadium: Color Line Stadion; Attendance: 6,735; Referee: Tore Hansen

18 July 2026 14	Molde	1–2	Brann	Molde
18:00 CEST (UTC+2)	Kabini (yellow card) 20'; Løvik (yellow card) 45+2'; Hansen (yellow card) 78'; Bender (yellow card) 83'; Diop 88'	Report	De Roeve 8'; Eriksen 35' (yellow card) 54'	Stadium: Aker Stadion; Attendance: 8,863; Referee: Marius Lien

26 July 2026 15	KFUM Oslo	2–4	Molde	Oslo
17:00 CEST (UTC+2)	Vinge 1'; Grødem (yellow card) 45+2'; Sørås (yellow card) 45+4'; Saunes (yellow card) 45+4'; B.Njie 60'	Report	Daga 40'; Breivik (yellow card) 45+4' (goal) 58'; Løvik (yellow card) 46'; Spiten-Nysæter (yellow card) 63'; Linnes 85'; Kabini 90+3'	Stadium: KFUM Arena; Attendance: 3,300; Referee: Sivert Amland

2 August 2026 16	Molde	3–3	Sarpsborg 08	Molde
17:00 CEST (UTC+2)	Granaas 22'; Hestad (yellow card) 40' (goal) 57'; Daga 60'	Report	Karlsbakk 33'; Nibe 51'; Sel (yellow card) 72'; Christiansen (yellow card) 74'; Posiadała 89'	Stadium: Aker Stadion; Attendance: 5,306; Referee: Stian Røvig Sletner

9 August 2026 17	Kristiansund	2–1	Molde	Kristiansund
19:15 CEST (UTC+2)	Kilen 25'; Alvheim 76'; Ulvestad (yellow card) 90+7'; Rønning (yellow card) 90+9'	Report	Hestad (yellow card) 62'; Hansen (yellow card) 76'; Koné-Doherty 89' (penalty missed) 90+5'; Ødegård (yellow card) 90+7'	Stadium: Kristiansund Stadion; Attendance: 3,805; Referee: Svein Tore Sinnes

16 August 2026 18	Molde	3–2	Tromsø	Molde
17:00 CEST (UTC+2)	Løvik (yellow card) 35'; Hestad 41' (pen.); Granaas (yellow card) 51'; Spiten-Nysæter 55'; Abdullai (yellow card) 61'; Linnes (yellow card) 88'; Koné-Doherty 90+2'	Report	H.A.Larsen 53' (yellow card) 84'; Camões 90+8'	Stadium: Aker Stadion; Attendance: 5,525; Referee: Espen Eskås

30 August 2026 19	Vålerenga	3–4	Molde	Oslo
17:00 CEST (UTC+2)	Haren 19'; Grundetjern 21' (yellow card) 78'; Lange 45+3'; Olsen (yellow card) 76'; Näsberg (yellow card) 80'	Report	Hestad 11'; Granaas 30' (yellow card) 76'; Abdullai 40'; Sery 45'; Breivik (yellow card) 70'	Stadium: Intility Arena; Attendance: 10,138; Referee: Christian Moen
Note: Match originally scheduled for 16:00hr on 29 August, but moved back due to the passing of Harald V.

6 September 2026 20	Molde	2–0	KFUM Oslo	Molde
17:00 CEST (UTC+2)	Spiten-Nysæter 37'; Koné-Doherty 73'	Report	Flaten (yellow card) 47' (yellow-red card) 61'	Stadium: Aker Stadion; Attendance: 5,277; Referee: Mathias Støfringshaug

13 September 2026 21	HamKam	1–5	Molde	Hamar
17:00 CEST (UTC+2)	Ofkir 46'	Report	Abdullai 5' (yellow card) 6'; Koné-Doherty 56', 58', 84'; Lonebu 90'	Stadium: Briskeby Stadion; Attendance: 3,441; Referee: Mischa Kellerhals

19 September 2026 22	Molde	1–2	Aalesund	Molde
18:00 CEST (UTC+2)	Ødegård (yellow card) 70'; Lonebu 82'	Report	Christensen 7' (yellow card) 90+7'; Andresen (yellow card) 31'; Skotheim 44'; Podlech (yellow card) 61'; Larsen (yellow card) 90+7'	Stadium: Aker Stadion; Attendance: 6,706; Referee: Rohit Saggi

11 October 2026 23	Lillestrøm	2–2	Molde	Lillestrøm
19:15 CEST (UTC+2)	Vá 16'; Foss 87'	Report	Kilen 10' (yellow card) 37'; Granaas (yellow card) 24'; Breivik 26'; Linnes (yellow card) 50'; Daga (yellow card) 80'	Stadium: Åråsen Stadion; Attendance: 6,503; Referee: Espen Eskås

18 October 2026 24	Molde	6–1	Start	Molde
17:00 CEST (UTC+2)	Kilen 29', 65', 77'; Lonebu 39' (pen.); Dahl (yellow card) 53'; Sery 56'; Haugan (yellow card) 73'; Breivik 79'	Report	Samuyiwa (yellow card) 19'; Segberg (yellow card) 38'; Koutsakos (penalty missed) 51'; Norheim 54'	Stadium: Aker Stadion; Attendance: 5,074; Referee: Stian Røvig Sletner

25 October 2026 12	Molde	5–1	Fredrikstad	Molde
19:15 CET (UTC+1)	Sery (yellow card) 2'; Lonebu 11', 17', 60', 63'; Breivik 35'; Linnes (yellow card) 70'	Report	Fiabema 8'; Holm (yellow card) 54'	Stadium: Aker Stadion; Attendance: 5,023; Referee: Ola Hobber Nilsen

1 November 2026 25	Brann	3–2	Molde	Bergen
14:30 CET (UTC+1)	Torsvik 1'; Magnússon (yellow card) 34'; Knudsen (yellow card) 45+5'; Holm 61'; Ingason (yellow card) 73' (goal) 81'; Nilsen (yellow card) 87'; Pedersen (yellow card) 90+2'	Report	Kilen 23'; Daga (yellow card) 35'; Lonebu 68' (pen.); Løvik (yellow card) 90'	Stadium: Brann Stadion; Attendance: 15,819; Referee: Mischa Kellerhals

8 November 2026 26	Sandefjord	5–5	Molde	Sandefjord
17:00 CET (UTC+1)	Patoulidis 1', 25', 69'; Egeli 9'; Dunsby (yellow card) 67'; Berntsen 84'; Pedersen (yellow card) 90+9'	Report	Sery 19'; Lonebu 28', 35'; Daga (yellow card) 45+1'; Højbjerg 45+4'; Stenevik (yellow card) 77'; Granaas 90'	Stadium: Sandefjord Arena; Attendance: 4,442; Referee: Mohammad Usman Aslam

20 November 2026 27	Molde	2–4	Bodø/Glimt	Molde
19:00 CET (UTC+1)				Stadium: Aker Stadion

==== Table ====
Pos	Team	Pld	W	D	L	GF	GA	GD	Pts	Qualification or relegation
3	Rosenborg	26	14	4	8	53	32	+21	46	Qualification for the Conference League second qualifying round
4	Lillestrøm	26	14	3	9	39	35	+4	45	Qualification for the Conference League second qualifying round
5	Molde	26	13	5	8	64	44	+20	44	
6	Tromsø	26	11	7	8	43	40	+3	40	
7	Brann	26	10	3	13	47	44	+3	33	

Updated to match(es) played on 9 November 2026. Source: Football Association of Norway (in Norwegian)
Rules for classification: 1) Points; 2) Goal difference; 3) Goals scored; 4) Head-to-head points; 5) Head-to-head goal difference; 6) Head-to-head goals scored.

=== Norwegian Cup ===
==== 2025–26 ====
5 March 2026 Fourth round	Molde	1–2	Bodø/Glimt	Molde
19:00 CET (UTC+1)	Christensen (yellow card) 54'; Breivik 69'	Report	Auklend 32', 73' (yellow card) 85'	Stadium: Aker Stadion; Attendance: 3,986; Referee: Ola Hobber Nilsen
Note: Match originally scheduled for 6 March.

==== 2026–27 ====
22 August 2026 First Round	Midsund	0–11	Molde	Midsund
16:00 CEST (UTC+2)		Report	Koné-Doherty 22', 44', 52'; Ødegård 24'; Stølen 31' (o.g.); Bender 42', 90'; Haugan 53', 59'; Hestad 63', 78'	Stadium: Midsund stadion Attendance: 750; Referee: Oliver Skaret Barsøe

16 September 2026 Second Round	Trygg/Lade	0–5	Molde	Trondheim
18:00 CEST (UTC+2)		Report	Sery 25', 84'; Granaas 56'; Abdullai 75', 79' (pen.)	Stadium: Koteng Arena; Attendance: 530; Referee: Preben Øien

28 October 2026 Third Round	Molde	4–1	Strømsgodset	Molde
18:00 CET (UTC+1)	Koné-Doherty 10'; Risa (yellow card) 30'; Abdullai 42'; Ødegård 89', 90+5'	Report	Dedes 20'; Wikheim (yellow card) 37'; Heredia-Randen (yellow card) 55'	Stadium: Aker Stadion; Referee: Sigurd Kringstad

See 2027 Season for the Fourth round match against Odd

== Squad statistics ==
As of match played 8 November 2026

=== Appearances and goals ===
No.	Pos	Nat	Player	Total		Eliteserien		2025–26 Cup		2026–27 Cup	
No.	Pos	Nat	Player	Apps	Goals	Apps	Goals	Apps	Goals	Apps	Goals
1	GK	(Denmark) DEN	Mads Kikkenborg	5	0	4	0	1	0	0	0
4	DF	(Norway) NOR	Sivert Sira Hansen	21	0	17+1	0	1	0	0+2	0
5	MF	(Norway) NOR	Eirik Hestad	19	10	15+2	8	0+1	0	1	2
6	MF	(Norway) NOR	Niklas Ødegård	12	3	4+5	0	1	0	2	3
8	DF	(Norway) NOR	Mathias Løvik	12	0	7+4	0	1	0	0	0
9	FW	(Ghana) GHA	Jalal Abdullai	21	6	12+6	3	0+1	2	1+1	1
10	MF	(Norway) NOR	Emil Breivik	29	11	25	10	2	1	2	0
11	FW	(Ivory Coast) CIV	Caleb Zady Sery	24	5	11+9	3	2	2	1+1	0
12	GK	(Norway) NOR	Peder Hoel Lervik	3	0	2	0	0	0	1	0
15	MF	(Norway) NOR	Vebjørn Hoff	13	1	11+1	1	0+1	0	0	0
16	FW	(Norway) NOR	Sander Kilen	9	5	6+2	5	1	0	0	0
17	MF	(Norway) NOR	Mats Møller Dæhli	20	0	8+9	0	0+1	0	1+1	0
18	DF	(Norway) NOR	Halldor Stenevik	14	0	12+1	0	0+1	0	0	0
19	DF	(Norway) NOR	Eirik Haugan	19	2	8+8	0	1	0	2	2
20	FW	(Norway) NOR	Kristian Lonebu	8	10	5+2	10	1	0	0	0
21	FW	(Norway) NOR	Oskar Spiten-Nysæter	20	3	10+8	3	0+1	0	1	0
22	GK	(Poland) POL	Albert Posiadała	23	0	20+1	0	1	0	1	0
23	MF	(Norway) NOR	Sondre Granaas	26	5	19+4	4	1+1	1	0+1	0
24	FW	(Republic of Ireland) IRL	Trent Koné-Doherty	24	10	7+14	6	0+1	0	2	4
25	DF	(Norway) NOR	Martin Linnes	20	1	16+4	1	0	0	0	0
26	DF	(South Africa) RSA	Samukele Kabini	22	1	16+2	1	2	0	2	0
27	DF	(Norway) NOR	Fredrik Kristensen Dahl	9	0	5+2	0	0+1	0	0+1	0
28	MF	(Denmark) DEN	Viktor Bender	16	2	0+12	0	2	0	2	2
29	FW	(Senegal) SEN	Seydina Diop	3	1	0+3	1	0	0	0	0
30	MF	(Nigeria) NGR	Daniel Daga	16	2	12+2	2	0	0	1+1	0
33	DF	(Norway) NOR	Birk Risa	27	0	19+5	0	1	0	2	0
42	MF	(Norway) NOR	Jonathan Fugelsnes	1	0	0	0	0	0	0+1	0
44	FW	(Norway) NOR	Igor Gosik	3	0	0+2	0	0	0	0+1	0
45	DF	(Norway) NOR	Noah Ljøen Bye	1	0	0+1	0	0	0	0	0
49	DF	(Norway) NOR	Daniel Nakken	1	0	0	0	0+1	0	0	0
55	MF	(Norway) NOR	Ulrik Langlie Skrede	1	0	0	0	1	0	0	0
Players away from Molde on loan:
14	MF	(Denmark) DEN	Jacob Steen Christensen	11	0	6+4	0	1	0	0	0
31	MF	(Kosovo) KOS	Blerton Isufi	4	0	0+4	0	0	0	0	0
Players who appeared for Molde no longer at the club:
6	DF	(Norway) NOR	Isak Amundsen	6	0	2+4	0	0	0	0	0
8	FW	(Norway) NOR	Fredrik Gulbrandsen	12	4	6+5	4	1	0	0	0
20	FW	(Norway) NOR	Kristian Eriksen	3	0	2	0	1	0	0	0
20	MF	(Denmark) DEN	Mads Enggård	2	0	0+2	0	0	0	0	0

=== Goal scorers ===
Rank	Pos.	No.	Nat.	Player	Eliteserien	2025–26 Cup	2026–27 Cup	Total
1	MF	10	(Norway)	Emil Breivik	10	1	0	11
2	FW	20	(Norway)	Kristian Lonebu	10	0	0	10
2	MF	5	(Norway)	Eirik Hestad	8	0	2	10
2	MF	24	(Republic of Ireland)	Trent Koné-Doherty	6	0	4	10
5	FW	9	(Ghana)	Jalal Abdullai	3	0	3	6
6	FW	16	(Norway)	Sander Kilen	5	0	0	5
6	MF	23	(Norway)	Sondre Granaas	4	0	1	5
6	FW	11	(Ivory Coast)	Caleb Zady Sery	3	0	2	5
9	FW	8	(Norway)	Fredrik Gulbrandsen	4	0	0	4
10	FW	21	(Norway)	Oskar Spiten-Nysæter	3	0	0	3
10	MF	6	(Norway)	Niklas Ødegård	0	0	3	3
10				Own goal	2	0	1	3
13	MF	30	(Nigeria)	Daniel Daga	2	0	0	2
13	FW	28	(Denmark)	Viktor Bender	0	0	2	2
13	DF	19	(Norway)	Eirik Haugan	0	0	2	2
16	MF	15	(Norway)	Vebjørn Hoff	1	0	0	1
16	FW	29	(Senegal)	Seydina Diop	1	0	0	1
16	DF	25	(Norway)	Martin Linnes	1	0	0	1
16	DF	26	(South Africa)	Samukele Kabini	1	0	0	1
TOTALS					64	1	20	80

=== Clean sheets ===
Rank	Pos.	No.	Nat.	Player	Eliteserien	2025–26 Cup	2026–27 Cup	Total
1	GK	22	(Poland)	Albert Posiadała	3	0	1	4
2	GK	1	(Denmark)	Mads Kikkenborg	1	0	0	1
2	GK	12	(Norway)	Peder Hoel Lervik	0	0	1	1
TOTALS					3	0	2	5

=== Disciplinary record ===
No.	Pos.	Nat.	Name	Eliteserien		2025–26 Cup		2026–27 Cup		Total	
No.	Pos.	Nat.	Name	Yellow card	Red card	Yellow card	Red card	Yellow card	Red card	Yellow card	Red card
4	DF	(Norway)	Sivert Sira Hansen	2	0	0	0	0	0	2	0
5	MF	(Norway)	Eirik Hestad	8	0	0	0	0	0	8	0
6	MF	(Norway)	Niklas Ødegård	2	0	0	0	0	0	2	0
8	DF	(Norway)	Mathias Løvik	4	0	0	0	0	0	4	0
9	FW	(Ghana)	Jalal Abdullai	3	0	0	0	0	0	3	0
10	MF	(Norway)	Emil Breivik	2	0	0	0	0	0	2	0
11	FW	(Ivory Coast)	Caleb Zady Sery	1	0	0	0	0	0	1	0
16	FW	(Norway)	Sander Kilen	1	0	0	0	0	0	1	0
17	MF	(Norway)	Mats Møller Dæhli	1	0	0	0	0	0	1	0
18	DF	(Norway)	Halldor Stenevik	2	0	0	0	0	0	2	0
19	DF	(Norway)	Eirik Haugan	1	0	0	0	0	0	1	0
21	FW	(Norway)	Oskar Spiten-Nysæter	2	0	0	0	0	0	2	0
22	GK	(Poland)	Albert Posiadała	2	0	0	0	0	0	2	0
23	MF	(Norway)	Sondre Granaas	5	0	0	0	0	0	5	0
25	DF	(Norway)	Martin Linnes	3	0	0	0	0	0	3	0
26	DF	(South Africa)	Samukele Kabini	4	2	0	0	0	0	4	2
27	DF	(Norway)	Fredrik Kristensen Dahl	1	0	0	0	0	0	1	0
28	MF	(Denmark)	Viktor Bender	1	0	0	0	0	0	1	0
30	MF	(Nigeria)	Daniel Daga	3	0	0	0	0	0	3	0
33	DF	(Norway)	Birk Risa	1	0	0	0	1	0	2	0
Players away from Molde on loan:
14	MF	(Denmark)	Jacob Steen Christensen	0	0	1	0	0	0	1	0
Players who appeared for Molde no longer at the club:
6	DF	(Norway)	Isak Amundsen	1	0	0	0	0	0	1	0
8	FW	(Norway)	Fredrik Gulbrandsen	2	0	0	0	0	0	2	0
TOTALS				52	2	1	0	1	0	54	2

== See also ==
- Molde FK seasons
