= Oskar Spiten-Nysæter =

Norwegian footballer

Personal information
- Date of birth: 29 August 2007 (age 19)
- Place of birth: Asker, Norway
- Height: 1.77 m (5 ft 10 in)
- Position: Forward

Team information
- Current team: Molde
- Number: 21

Youth career
- –2020: Asker
- 2021–2023: Stabæk

Senior career*
Years	Team	Apps	(Gls)
2023–2025	Stabæk 2	23	(11)
2023–2025	Stabæk	34	(12)
2025–	Molde	27	(7)

International career^{‡}
2022	Norway U15	4	(1)
2023	Norway U16	13	(3)
2024	Norway U17	6	(1)
2024–	Norway U18	7	(1)
2025–	Norway U19	2	(1)
- * Club domestic league appearances and goals as of 6 September 2026 ‡ National team caps and goals as of 21 September 2025

Oskar Spiten-Nysæter (born 29 August 2007) is a Norwegian professional footballer who plays as a forward for the Eliteserien club Molde.

== Club career ==
Spiten-Nysæter is a youth product of his local club Asker, before moving to the academy of Stabæk in 2021. On 29 August 2022, he signed his first professional contract with Stabæk. On 20 September 2023, he extended his contract with the club until 2026. He made his senior and professional debut with Stabæk in a 2–2 Eliteserien tie with Sarpsborg 08 on 29 October 2023, and in doing so became their youngest debutant ever at the age of 16 years and 61 days.

On May 3, 2025, Oskar Spiten-Nysæter was given a five-match suspension for his performance during the Norwegian First Division match between Moss and Stabæk on April 27, 2025.

In July 2025, Spiten-Nysæter signed for Eliteserien club Molde. Reports put the sale at around 25 to 30 million NOK, making it the most expensive transfer between two Norwegian clubs. In June 2026, Spiten-Nysæter extended his contract with Molde for an additional season, keeping him at the club until the end of the 2031 season.

== International career ==
Spiten-Nysæter is a youth international for Norway having played up to the Norway U17s.

== Career statistics ==
As of 6 September 2026

Appearances and goals by club, season and competition
Club	Season	League			National Cup		Total	
Club	Season	Division	Apps	Goals	Apps	Goals	Apps	Goals
Stabæk 2	2023	3. divisjon	17	5	—		17	5
Stabæk 2	2024	3. divisjon	3	3	—		3	3
Stabæk 2	2025	3. divisjon	3	3	—		3	3
Stabæk 2	Total		23	11	—		23	11
Stabæk	2023	Eliteserien	4	0	1	0	5	0
Stabæk	2024	1. divisjon	22	11	5	2	27	13
Stabæk	2025	Eliteserien	8	1	5	2	13	3
Stabæk	Total		34	12	11	4	45	16
Molde	2025	Eliteserien	13	4	1	0	14	4
Molde	2026	Eliteserien	14	3	0	0	14	3
Molde	Total		27	7	1	0	28	7
Career total			84	30	12	4	96	34

== Honours ==
Individual

- Norwegian First Division Young Player of the Month: May 2024, June 2024
- Norwegian First Division Player of the Month: June 2024
