= Jacob Steen Christensen =

Danish footballer (born 2001)

Personal information
- Full name: Jacob Steen Vestergaard Christensen
- Date of birth: 25 June 2001 (age 25)
- Place of birth: Copenhagen, Denmark
- Height: 1.80 m (5 ft 11 in)
- Position: Midfielder

Team information
- Current team: Sønderjyske (on loan from Molde)
- Number: 33

Youth career
- AB
- 2012–2018: Nordsjælland

Senior career*
Years	Team	Apps	(Gls)
2018–2023	Nordsjælland	141	(1)
2023–2025	1. FC Köln	7	(0)
2023–2024	1. FC Köln II	2	(0)
2025–	Molde	16	(0)
2026–	→ Sønderjyske (loan)	3	(0)

International career^{‡}
2017	Denmark U16	3	(0)
2017–2018	Denmark U17	7	(0)
2018–2020	Denmark U19	12	(0)
2019	Denmark U21	1	(0)
2021	Denmark U20	2	(0)
- * Club domestic league appearances and goals as of 2 September 2026 ‡ National team caps and goals as of 17:22, 12 December 2021 (UTC)

Jacob Steen Vestergaard Christensen (born 25 June 2001), also known as Jaxe, is a Danish professional footballer who plays for Sønderjyske, on loan from Molde in Norwegian Eliteserien.

== Career ==
=== FC Nordsjælland ===
Christensen played for Akademisk Boldklub (AB) before moving to FC Nordsjælland at the age of 12. In preparation for the 2018–19 season, he practiced with the first team. He was later permanently promoted to the first team by head coach Kasper Hjulmand.

On 15 July 2018, the first matchday of the new season, he made his debut at the age of 17 in a 1–1 draw against Esbjerg fB in the Danish Superliga, when he came on for Benjamin Hansen in the 73rd minute of the game. On 1 October, he signed a contract extension, keeping him a part of Nordsjælland until 2021. Christensen established himself as a substitute and made 22 league appearances during his first season, in which he did not score.

In the following season – 2019–20 – Christensen made his breakthrough as a starter. On 31 August 2019, he scored his first goal in the Superliga in a 2–1 home win over Hobro IK. During the season, he made 32 league appearances in which he scored one goal.

=== 1. FC Köln ===
In July 2023, Christensen joined Bundesliga club 1.FC Köln on a free transfer and signed a contract until 2026. He made his debut for the club in DFB Pokal on 14 August 2023 appearing as a substitute against VfL Osnabrück, in a 3–1 win away after extra time for his new club. He made his Bundesliga debut appearing as a substitute in a 1–1 draw on 27 January 2024 away against VfL Wolfsburg. He made his first league start for the club on 13 April 2024, away against Bayern Munich.

=== Molde ===
On 1 September 2025, Christensen signed a contract with Molde in Norway until the end of 2028.

=== Sønderjyske ===
On 10 August 2026, Christensen returned to Denmark, to play for Sønderjyske on a loan-deal until June 2027.

== Career statistics ==
As of match played 20 April 2024

Appearances and goals by club, season and competition
Club	Season	League			National cup (Note: Includes Danish Cup, DFB-Pokal)		Continental		Other		Total	
Club	Season	Division	Apps	Goals	Apps	Goals	Apps	Goals	Apps	Goals	Apps	Goals
Nordsjælland	2018–19	Danish Superliga	22	0	0	0	5 (Note: Appearances in UEFA Europa League)	0	—		27	0
Nordsjælland	2019–20	Danish Superliga	32	1	0	0	—		—		32	1
Nordsjælland	2020–21	Danish Superliga	29	0	0	0	—		—		29	0
Nordsjælland	2021–22	Danish Superliga	28	0	2	0	—		—		30	0
Nordsjælland	2022–23	Danish Superliga	30	0	7	1	—		—		37	1
Nordsjælland	Total		141	1	9	1	5	0	—		155	2
1. FC Köln	2023–24	Bundesliga	7	0	1	0	—		—		8	0
1. FC Köln	2024–25	2. Bundesliga	0	0	0	0	—		—		0	0
1. FC Köln	Total		7	0	1	0	—		—		8	0
1. FC Köln II	2023–24	Regionalliga West	2	0	—		—		—		2	0
Molde	2025	Eliteserien	6	0	1	0	—		—		7	0
Molde	2026	Eliteserien	10	0	0	0	—		—		10	0
Molde	Total		16	0	1	0	—		—		17	0
Sønderjyske	2026–27	Danish Superliga	3	0	0	0	—		—		3	0
Career total			169	1	11	1	5	0	—		185	2

== Honours ==
1.FC Koln

- 2.Bundesliga: 2024–25
