= Sivert Sira Hansen =

Norwegian footballer (born 2002)

Personal information
- Date of birth: 30 May 2002 (age 24)
- Place of birth: Flekkefjord, Norway
- Height: 1.95 m (6 ft 5 in)
- Position: Centre-back

Team information
- Current team: Molde
- Number: 4

Youth career
- –2020: Flekkefjord

Senior career*
Years	Team	Apps	(Gls)
2019	Flekkefjord	14	(0)
2021–2023	Mandalskameratene	60	(12)
2024–2025	Start	55	(4)
2026–	Molde	18	(0)
- * Club domestic league appearances and goals as of 14 September 2026

Sivert Sira Hansen (born 30 May 2002) is a Norwegian footballer who plays as a centre-back for Molde FK.

== Career ==
Born in Flekkefjord, he played for Flekkefjord FK where he made his senior debut in the 2019 Fourth Division. He only played youth football in 2020, as senior leagues below the Second Division were cancelled because of COVID-19. Ahead of the 2021 season he joined Mandalskameratene.

He moved on to IK Start on the second tier ahead of the 2024 season. At the end of the summer 2025 transfer window, Sira Hansen was reportedly "very close to an agreement" with Tromsø IL. He chose to remain in Start, however, won promotion to the 2026 Eliteserien and was selected for Team of the Year in the First Division. Despite winning promotion, Start sold Hansen to Molde FK in January 2026.

Injured during the winter, Hansen made his Molde debut in the 2025–26 cup against Bodø/Glimt. He soon became a starting player.

== Personal life ==
Tobias Sira Hansen is Sivert's two years younger brother, and in 2024 the two met in the cup as Tobias still played for Mandalskameratene. Despite Mandalskameratene playing two tiers below Start, the minnows knocked Start out of the cup.

His younger sister Stine also played for Flekkefjord.
