= Trent Koné-Doherty =

Ireland international footballer (born 2006)

Personal information
- Full name: Trent Toure Koné-Doherty
- Date of birth: 30 June 2006 (age 20)
- Place of birth: Derry, Northern Ireland
- Height: 1.75 m (5 ft 9 in)
- Position: Left winger

Team information
- Current team: Molde
- Number: 24

Youth career
- 2012–2019: Foyle Harps
- 2019–2022: Derry City
- 2022–2026: Liverpool

Senior career*
Years	Team	Apps	(Gls)
2022	Derry City	0	(0)
2025–2026	Liverpool	0	(0)
2026–	Molde	16	(6)

International career^{‡}
2021–2022	Republic of Ireland U16	7	(5)
2021–2023	Republic of Ireland U17	6	(0)
2023–2025	Republic of Ireland U19	14	(0)
2025–	Republic of Ireland U21	11	(1)
- * Club domestic league appearances and goals as of 20:02, 13 September 2026 (UTC) ‡ National team caps and goals as of 00:01, 18 November 2026 (UTC)

Trent Toure Koné-Doherty (born 30 June 2006) is an Irish professional footballer who plays as a left winger for Eliteserien club Molde. Born in Northern Ireland, he represents the Republic of Ireland at youth level.

== Club career ==
=== Youth career ===
Born in Derry, Koné-Doherty first started playing football for local side Foyle Harps, joining at the age of six.

=== Derry City ===
He joined Derry City at the age of thirteen, and went on to train with the first team squad, being involved in pre-season friendlies and earning himself a spot on the bench for a League of Ireland Premier Division game against St Patrick's Athletic at the age of fifteen. Despite not making his debut for Derry City, he began to attract attention from Scottish club Celtic and English club Liverpool, having gone on trial with the former in 2020.

=== Liverpool ===
In July 2022, he signed for Liverpool in a deal worth a reported £150,000. His career in Merseyside got off to a blistering start, scoring nine goals in his first 10 appearances for Liverpool's youth teams. In August 2023, he scored on his Premier League 2 debut for Liverpool under-21s. Koné-Doherty signed his first professional contract with the club on 31 October 2023. He was named in Liverpool's first team squad for the first time when he was named on the bench against PSV Eindhoven on 29 January 2025 and on 9 February, he made his first team competitive debut, coming on as a second-half substitute for Trey Nyoni in a 1–0 FA Cup fourth round loss away to Plymouth Argyle.

=== Molde ===
On 27 February 2026, Kone-Doherty signed for Norwegian Eliteserien club Molde on a four-year deal. He made his debut for the club on 5 March 2026, coming on as a substitute in a 2–1 NM Cup defeat to Bodø/Glimt. In April 2026, he stated that "It wasn't an easy decision to take" to leave Liverpool, that he left as he wanted regular first team minutes and that fellow Derry man James McClean offers him support and advice on his career.

== International career ==
Koné-Doherty was born in Northern Ireland to an Ivorian father and Irish mother. has represented the Republic of Ireland at under-16, under-17 and under-19 level. In 2022, he was named "best player" at the under-16 Miljan Miljanic Tournament in Serbia. On 28 August 2025, he received his first call up to the Republic of Ireland U21 squad.

== Career statistics ==
As of match played 19 September 2026

Appearances and goals by club, season and competition
Club	Season	League			National cup (Note: Includes FA Cup, Norwegian Football Cup)		League cup (Note: Includes EFL Cup)		Europe		Other		Total	
Club	Season	Division	Apps	Goals	Apps	Goals	Apps	Goals	Apps	Goals	Apps	Goals	Apps	Goals
Derry City	2022	LOI Premier Division	0	0	0	0	—		0	0	—		0	0
Liverpool U21	2023–24	—			—		—		—		1 (Note: Appearance(s) in EFL Trophy)	0	1	0
Liverpool U21	2024–25	—			—		—		—		2	0	2	0
Liverpool U21	2025–26	—			—		—		—		1	0	1	0
Liverpool U21	Total		—		—		—		—		4	0	4	0
Liverpool	2024–25	Premier League	0	0	1	0	0	0	0	0	—		1	0
Liverpool	2025–26	Premier League	0	0	0	0	1	0	0	0	0	0	1	0
Liverpool	Total		0	0	1	0	1	0	0	0	0	0	2	0
Molde	2026	Eliteserien	17	6	2	3	—		—		—		19	9
Career total			17	6	3	3	1	0	0	0	4	0	25	9
