= Martin Falk =

Swedish football manager and bandy player (born 1995)

Personal information
- Date of birth: 28 March 1995 (age 31)
- Place of birth: Trollhättan, Sweden

Team information
- Current team: Molde (assistant manager)

Managerial career
- Years: Team
- 2021: Sandviken
- 2025: IFK Norrköping
- 2025–2026: Molde (interim)
- 2026–: Molde (assistant)

Martin Falk (born 28 March 1995) is a Swedish professional football manager and former bandy player. He is the assistant manager of Norwegian Eliteserien club Molde.

== Career ==
Born in Trollhättan, Falk was a goalkeeper in bandy. He won a Swedish championship with Sandviken and a world under-21 championship with the Sweden national team. Inspired by the computer game Football Manager, he stopped playing bandy in 2016 and became a full-time football coach in the youth ranks at Sandviken and Västerås SK. He returned to Sandviken in 2021, as head coach in the third-tier Ettan Fotboll.

Falk was assistant manager at AIK, leaving in July 2023 for the same position at Malmö. At the end of 2024, he signed for three years as head coach of IFK Norrköping in Allsvenskan.

Falk's debut on 15 February 2025 was a 2–1 win away to Karlbergs in the group stage of Svenska Cupen. His first league game on 30 March was a 4–3 home win over Östers. The team were in 10th with six games remaining, but lost all of those and ended in the relegation play-off place, which they lost 3–0 on aggregate to Örgryte.

At the end of 2025, Norwegian Eliteserien club Molde appointed Sindre Tjelmeland as their head coach, effective from the end of his duties with Lech Poznań in May 2026. Falk was hired as interim manager until then.
