= Fredrik Kristensen Dahl =

Norwegian footballer (born 1999)

Personal information
- Date of birth: 30 January 1999 (age 27)
- Place of birth: Norway
- Height: 1.85 m (6 ft 1 in)
- Positions: Central defender; left-back

Team information
- Current team: Molde
- Number: 27

Youth career
- Våg
- 2015–2017: Start

Senior career*
Years	Team	Apps	(Gls)
2018–2019	Fram	46	(0)
2020–2022	KFUM	69	(1)
2023–2025	Strømsgodset	87	(2)
2026–	Molde	0	(0)
- * Club domestic league appearances and goals as of 28 August 2026

Fredrik Kristensen Dahl (born 30 January 1999) is a Norwegian footballer who plays as a left back or centre-back for Molde.

== Career ==
He played children's football for Våg before entering the academy of Start. In 2018, he left Kristiansand to start his senior career in Fram, though he was not resentful towards Start and was open to play there in the future. While in Fram, he held a job outside of sports. Following consistent performances, he went from the third to the second tier in 2020, signing for KFUM.

A transfer bid for Dahl was placed by Stabæk in January 2023, with HamKam and Tromsø also being contenders, before Dahl was lured to Strømsgodset by his former manager in KFUM, Jørgen Isnes.

After Dahl's first season in Strømsgodset, interest from Molde was reported, and in the summer of 2025, Lech Poznań wanted the player. Fredrikstad was another club with Dahl on their wishlist. After the 2025 Eliteserien season, Dahl was named "SIF Lad of the Year", but the team were relegated. He remained in the Eliteserien as he signed for Molde FK, but already in the pre-season he sustained a knee injury that sidelined him for several months.

== Personal life ==
He is nicknamed "Flekka".
