= Mads Kikkenborg =

Danish footballer (born 1999)

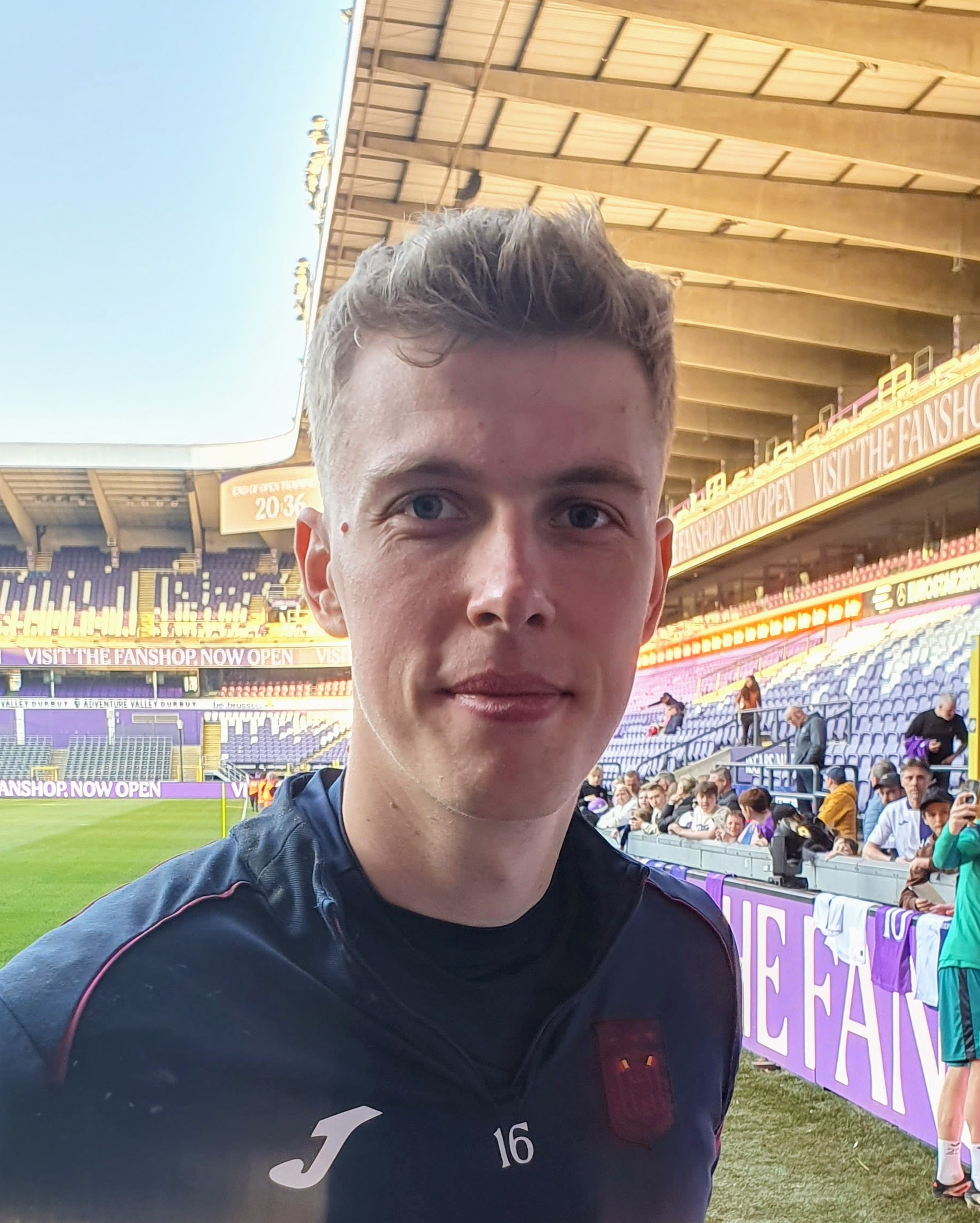
- Mads Kikkenborg for RSC Anderlecht in 2025

Personal information
- Full name: Mads Juhl Kikkenborg
- Date of birth: 7 October 1999 (age 27)
- Place of birth: Esbjerg, Denmark
- Height: 1.97 m (6 ft 6 in)
- Position: Goalkeeper

Team information
- Current team: Molde
- Number: 1

Youth career
- Esbjerg fB

Senior career*
Years	Team	Apps	(Gls)
2020–2021	Esbjerg fB	25	(0)
2020	→ Sydvest 05 (loan)	7	(0)
2021–2024	Lyngby	49	(0)
2024–2026	Anderlecht	2	(0)
2026–	Molde	1	(0)

International career
2018	Denmark U19	4	(0)
- * Club domestic league appearances and goals as of 15:55, 20 January 2026 (UTC)

Mads Juhl Kikkenborg (born 7 October 1999) is a Danish professional footballer who plays as a goalkeeper for Eliteserien club Molde.

== Career ==
=== Esbjerg fB ===
Kikkenborg is a product of Esbjerg fB, where he worked his way up through the youth ranks. In May 2019, Kikkenborg was on the bench for three Danish Superliga games, however, without making his debut. On 19 December 2019 it was confirmed, that Kikkenborg would play the rest of the 2019–20 season on loan for Danish 2nd Division club FC Sydvest 05. However, he would still train with Esbjerg, due to the geographical distance between the clubs. Kikkenborg made seven appearances for the 2nd Division team.

After returning from the loan spell, Kikkenborg became a permanent part of the first team squad. On 2 September 2020, 20-year old Kikkenborg got his official debut for Esbjerg in a Danish Cup game against Glamsbjerg IF. About two months later, on 24 October 2020, he got his Danish 1st Division debut against Hobro IK. Kikkenborg made 24 league appearances in that season. At the end of November 2020, Kikkenborg signed a new deal with Esbjerg until July 2024.

On 28 July 2021, 21 of Esbjerg's first-team players including Kikkenborg, sent an open letter to club management, expressing "strong distrust" to the clubs manager, Peter Hyballa. The letter, which was also published in several media outlets, mentions several episodes where Hyballa had physically or mentally abused players. In the wake of all the fuss, the club confirmed on 4 August 2021 that Kikkenborg had had his contract terminated by mutual agreement.

=== Lyngby ===
Five days after leaving Esbjerg - on 9 August 2021 - Danish 1st Division club Lyngby Boldklub confirmed, that Kikkenborg had joined the club on a deal until June 2024. With three strong goalkeepers in the squad, Kikkenborg had to wait until 6 November 2021 before he made his debut: it was in a league match against Hvidovre IF, which they lost 0–1. Kikkenborg was noted for just six appearances in that season, but helped the team with promotion to the 2022–23 Danish Superliga.

Kikkenborg made his debut in the highest Danish league tier on 28 August 2022 against Viborg FF.

=== Anderlecht ===
On 27 January 2024, it was confirmed that Kikkenborg had joined Belgian Pro League club Anderlecht on a deal until June 2028.

=== Molde ===
On 20 January 2026, Kikkenborg moved to Norwegian Eliteserien side Molde.

== Career statistics ==
As of match played 28 October 2025

Appearances and goals by club, season and competition
Club	Season	League			National cup (Note: Includes Danish Cup, Belgian Cup)		Europe		Total	
Club	Season	Division	Apps	Goals	Apps	Goals	Apps	Goals	Apps	Goals
Esbjerg	2019–20	Danish 1st Division	0	0	0	0	—		0	0
Esbjerg	2020–21	Danish 1st Division	24	0	2	0	—		26	0
Esbjerg	2021–22	Danish 1st Division	1	0	0	0	—		1	0
Esbjerg	Total		25	0	2	0	—		27	0
Sydvest 05 (loan)	2019–20	Danish 2nd Division	6	0	—		—		6	0
Sydvest 05 (loan)	2020–21	Danish 2nd Division	1	0	—		—		1	0
Sydvest 05 (loan)	Total		7	0	—		—		7	0
Lyngby	2021–22	Danish 1st Division	6	0	0	0	—		6	0
Lyngby	2022–23	Danish Superliga	26	0	1	0	—		27	0
Lyngby	2023–24	Danish Superliga	17	0	3	0	—		20	0
Lyngby	Total		49	0	4	0	—		53	0
Anderlecht	2024–25	Belgian Pro League	1	0	1	0	1 (Note: Appearance in UEFA Europa League)	0	3	0
Anderlecht	2025–26	Belgian Pro League	0	0	1	0	—		1	0
Anderlecht	Total		1	0	2	0	1	0	4	0
Career total			82	0	8	0	1	0	91	0

== Honours ==
Individual

- Superliga Team of the Month: September 2023
