= Sander Kilen =

Norwegian footballer (born 2005)

Personal information
- Full name: Sander Hestetun Kilen
- Date of birth: 30 May 2005 (age 21)
- Place of birth: Årdal, Norway
- Height: 1.87 m (6 ft 2 in)
- Positions: Midfielder; forward

Team information
- Current team: Molde
- Number: 16

Youth career
- –2019: Jotun
- 2020–2023: Sogndal
- 2023–2024: Aalesund

Senior career*
Years	Team	Apps	(Gls)
2021–2022	Sogndal 2	23	(3)
2023–2024	Aalesund 2	25	(4)
2023–2024	Aalesund	24	(4)
2025–2026	Kristiansund	46	(7)
2026–	Molde	7	(5)

International career^{‡}
2024	Norway U19	9	(2)
2025–	Norway U20	4	(0)
2025–	Norway U21	1	(0)
- * Club domestic league appearances and goals as of 1 November 2026 ‡ National team caps and goals as of 26 September 2025

Sander Kilen (born 30 May 2005) is a Norwegian footballer who plays as an attacking midfielder or striker for Molde.

== Career ==
He started his youth career in Jotun, moving to Sogndal in 2020 and then Aalesund in 2023. He made his Eliteserien debut for Aalesund at the end of 2023. He was subsequently given a professional contract and added to the senior squad.

In 2025 he was bought by Eliteserien club Kristiansund. He made a breakthrough with his first hat-trick against Tromsø. Kristiansund came from a 0–1 deficit to win 3–2 away. One month later, his second hat-trick came, this time in the cup against Molde. This time, Kristiansund were behind 2–0, but turned around to win 4–3.

== Career statistics ==
As of 1 November 2026

Appearances and goals by club, season and competition
Club	Season	League			National Cup		Total	
Club	Season	Division	Apps	Goals	Apps	Goals	Apps	Goals
Sogndal 2	2021	3. divisjon	6	0	—		6	0
Sogndal 2	2022	4. divisjon	17	3	—		17	3
Sogndal 2	Total		23	3	—		23	3
Aalesund 2	2023	2. divisjon	24	3	—		24	3
Aalesund 2	2024	3. divisjon	1	1	—		1	1
Aalesund 2	Total		25	4	—		25	4
Aalesund	2023	1. divisjon	1	0	0	0	1	0
Aalesund	2024	1. divisjon	23	4	2	1	25	5
Aalesund	Total		24	4	2	1	26	5
Kristiansund	2025	Eliteserien	30	5	6	6	36	11
Kristiansund	2026	Eliteserien	16	2	0	0	16	2
Kristiansund	Total		45	7	6	6	51	13
Molde	2026	Eliteserien	7	5	1	0	8	5
Career total			124	23	9	7	133	30
