= Molde FK =

Norwegian association football club

Molde
- Full name: Molde Fotballklubb
- Short name: MFK
- Founded: 19 June 1911; 115 years ago (as International); 1915; 111 years ago (as Molde FK)
- Ground: Aker Stadion
- Capacity: 11,249
- Chairman: Odd Ivar Moen
- Manager: Sindre Tjelmeland
- League: Eliteserien
- 2025: Eliteserien, 10th of 16
- Website: moldefk.no
Home colours	Away colours

Molde Fotballklubb (Norwegian pronunciation: [ˈmɔ̂ɫdə]) is a football club based in Molde, Norway, that competes in Eliteserien, the top flight of Norwegian football. Founded on 19 June 1911, the club was originally known as International and changed its name to Molde in 1915. Molde is five-time league champions (2011, 2012, 2014, 2019 and 2022) and six-time Norwegian Cup winner (1994, 2005, 2013, 2014, 2022 and 2023), and has finished second in the league a further eleven times. Molde is one of only four Norwegian clubs to have participated in the UEFA Champions League.

The club's home matches are played at the 11,249-capacity Aker Stadion. The stadium was inaugurated in 1998, and was a gift from local businessmen Kjell Inge Røkke and Bjørn Rune Gjelsten. The club was formerly based at Molde stadion, which hosted the club's record attendance of 6,615. Molde's supporter club is called Tornekrattet ("Thicket of thorns", a reference to the city's nickname "The Town of Roses") and was founded after the 1994 Norwegian Cup final victory. Molde has its strongest rivalry with Rosenborg.

Until the beginning of the 1970s, the club mainly played in local lower division leagues, except for a short visit in the Hovedserien in the 1957–58 season. In 1974, Molde was back in the top division and finished second in the league, and have since then become one of Norway's leading clubs and generally stayed in the top division. Molde also finished second in the league in 1987, when the club lost the championship to Moss in the decisive match of the season.

During the 1990s and the beginning of the 2000s, Molde was the second-best team in Norway (behind 13-times in a row champions Rosenborg), with league silver medals in 1995, 1998, 1999 and 2002, and cup championships in 1994 and 2005, as well as participation in the UEFA Champions League in the 1999–2000 season, when Real Madrid, Porto and Olympiacos visited Molde.

As of 2017, the club has approximately 1,000 members and around 55 teams in three departments. Martin Falk was the interim manager of the club from December 2025 - May 2026; he was replaced by Sindre Tjelmeland in May 2026.

== History ==
=== Early years (1911–63) ===
Molde FK was founded on 19 June 1911 by a group gathered by Klaus Daae Andersen (born 30 September 1873); they named J. Ferdinand Dahl as the inaugural chairman. On a general election on 24 April 1912, it was decided that the club would be named International, perhaps because the opponents were primarily visitors from cruise ships or trading vessels, or that it was to make room for the many Danes who worked in the Gideon engine factory. The same year, on 5 August, the club played its first competitive match, an away match against Kristiansund which ended 2–2. The rising interest and activity in football in neighbouring towns caused the club to change its name to Molde Fotballklubb in 1915. The club played its first season in the top division in 1939–40, but the season was abandoned due to the German occupation and was never completed. In the first post-war season in 1947–48, Molde were relegated from the top flight.

=== The breakthrough (1964–77) ===
On 2 August 1964, Molde shocked nine-time Norwegian Cup champions and nine-time Norwegian League Champions Fredrikstad by eliminating them from the 1964 Norwegian Cup in the third round with a 3–2 win at home. Jan Fuglset, Torkild Brakstad and Harry Hestad, amongst others, played at Molde during that period. The club played in local lower leagues, save for a short visit in the top division in the 1957–58 season. In 1970, Molde was promoted to the second tier and played there for three seasons until its promotion to the top flight with a 5–1 away win against Sogndal on 16 September 1973.

In 1974, Molde returned to the premier division following the debut of several talented players in the first team, which coincided with the return of top level players like Fuglset, Brakstad and Hestad. Molde surprised the established clubs in their first season of the 1. divisjon, leading the league in 9 of 22 matchdays. Ahead of the final match of the season, Molde would win the league if they defeated Sarpsborg and Viking lost against Strømsgodset. However, both Molde and Viking won their last match, meaning Molde won the silver medal after finishing one point behind champions Viking.

Since then, Molde has generally stayed in the top division and has become one of Norway's leading clubs. The club has produced a respectable number of national team players, and players who have gone professional in foreign leagues.

=== Ups and downs (1978–93) ===
Between 1978 and 1984, Molde did not play on the same level in two consecutive years. Molde was relegated from the 1. divisjon in every even-numbered year, and promoted to back to the first tier in every odd-numbered year, making it three consecutive promotions and relegations. In fact, Molde and Brann did not play at the same level these years, as Brann were promoted when Molde was relegated and the other way around.

In 1982, Molde played in their first cup final, despite being relegated from the 1982 1. divisjon. They lost the final at Ullevaal Stadion 3–2 against Brann.

The 1987 season was the closest Molde came to winning the league championship before winning it in 2011, when a draw at home against Moss in the final round would have ensured the title. Despite numerous goal scoring opportunities, Moss won the match 2–0 at Molde stadium, thus winning the league championship, while Molde won their second silver medal. The attendance of 14,615 set the record at the old Molde stadion.

Molde played their second cup final in 1989. The first match against Viking ended in a 2–2 draw, and the subsequent replay was won 2–1 by Viking.

When Molde again was relegated from the Norwegian top flight in 1993, the club was in major economic difficulties following a number of projects, the most notably of which was an extension of the main stand at Molde stadion. Local businessmen Kjell Inge Røkke and Bjørn Rune Gjelsten started to invest in the club, and since 1993 they have invested approximately 500 million kr on old debts, new players and the new stadium.

=== The silver generation (1994–2000) ===
Åge Hareide was the main coach of Molde in 1994, when they finished second in their 1. divisjon group and was thus re-promoted to Tippeligaen. Molde also met their main rivals Rosenborg in the semi-final of the 1994 Norwegian Cup, and with 4–3 win on aggregate, Molde qualified for their third cup final. After having lost to Molde, Rosenborg head coach Nils Arne Eggen called Molde's playing style "arse-football" ("rævvafotball"). Molde won their first title by defeating Lyn 3–2 at Ullevaal Stadium in Oslo.

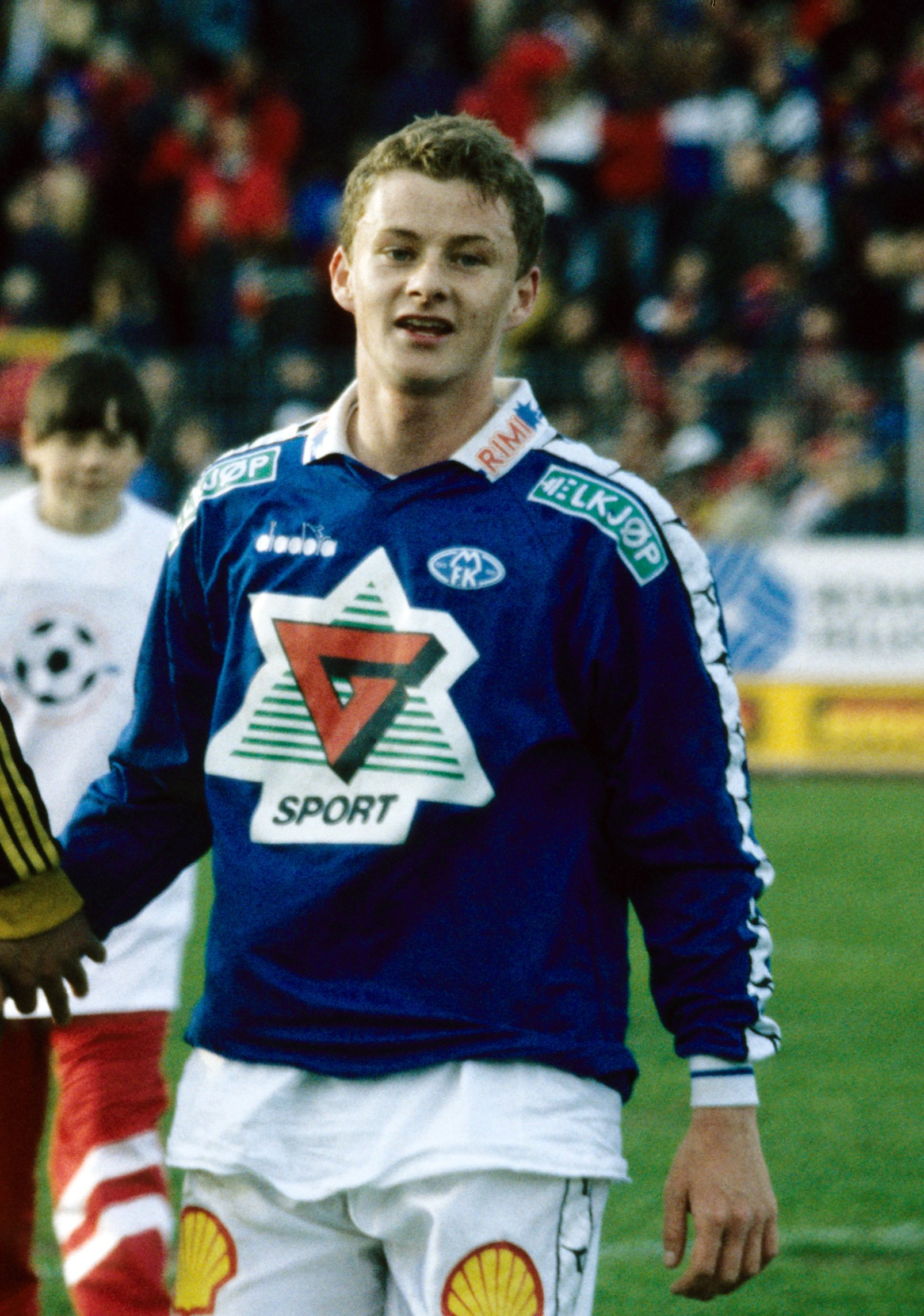
Molde striker Ole Gunnar Solskjær was signed by Manchester United after his successful two-season spell at Molde

During the 1995 season, Molde became known for their three strikers: Ole Gunnar Solskjær, Arild Stavrum and Ole Bjørn Sundgot. In their first league match, Molde won 6–0 against Brann in Bergen, with Solskjær scoring two goals and Stavrum and Sundgot also contributing in one of Brann's heaviest-ever losses at home. With six-straight wins, Molde stayed in the top two positions of the league throughout the season, but eventually finished second, 15 points behind Rosenborg.

Solskjær scored 31 goals in 42 matches for Molde and was sold to Manchester United on 29 July 1996 as Molde finished in eighth position that season. In 1997, Molde finished fourth in the league, and Erik Brakstad replaced Åge Hareide as head coach ahead of the 1998 season.

In 1998, Molde played their first 21 matches without losing, a Norwegian record until 2009, when Rosenborg went 26 matches undefeated. In the 22nd round, Molde lost against Vålerenga while Rosenborg defeated Kongsvinger to surpass Molde at the top of the table. Rosenborg player Mini Jakobsen subsequently said, "It was fun as long as you managed to keep up. Thank you for helping to create tension in the Premier League!" On 26 September 1998, Rosenborg won 2–0 against Molde in the 23rd round and won the championship, with Molde settling for second place.

In 1999, Molde had a successful season, finishing second in the league and reaching the semi-final of the 1999 Norwegian Cup, where they were eliminated by Brann. Molde also participated in the UEFA Champions League, where Molde was drawn against CSKA Moscow in the second qualifying round. In the first match in Moscow, Molde lost 2–0, while in the second leg, 19-year-old Magne Hoseth had his big break-through with two goals when CSKA was defeated 4–0 to send Molde to the third qualifying round, where they met Mallorca. The first leg against Mallorca ended 0–0 at home. Away at Mallorca were Molde one goal behind for a long time, but Andreas Lund became the big hero when he equalized on a penaltyin the 84th minute. With a 1–1 aggregate score, Molde qualified for the group stage on away goals, and Molde became the team from the smallest city to have qualified for the group stage of Champions League until Unirea Urziceni repeated the feat in 2009–10. In the group stage, Molde were drawn against Real Madrid, Porto and Olympiacos, and with one win and five losses, Molde finished last in their group. On the occasion of Molde's 100-year anniversary in 2011, the readers of the local newspaper Romsdals Budstikke voted 1999 as the best year in the history of the club.

=== From "Gunder method" to relegation (2001–2006) ===
On 6 November 2000, after the sacking of Erik Brakstad, Gunder Bengtsson was announced head coach for two years. After one season, Bengtsson and his assistant Kalle Björklund were signed for three more years. In 2002, Gunder Bengtsson led Molde to second place in the league, but like when he won the league with Vålerenga in 1983 and 1984, there was not much enthusiasm around the club's sixth silver medal because of the defensive tactics and lack of local players in the squad.

In the first six matches of the 2003 season, Molde collected five points. On 22 May 2003, Bengtsson was fired and replaced by Odd Berg. In the third round of 2003 Norwegian Cup, Molde were eliminated by second-tier club Skeid. Despite the change in the coaching staff, Molde was struggling in the relegation zone throughout the season, but after a 3–2 win away against Sogndal in the last match of the season, Molde avoided the relegation playoffs. In 2004, the team led by Reidar Vågnes, former assistant coach under Erik Brakstad, but Molde only managed 11th place, four points clear of relegation.

In 2005, Bo Johansson became head coach of Molde, and on 15 June 2005, Molde won 3–2 against Nybergsund to qualify for the fourth round of the Norwegian Cup, having lost in the third round for three consecutive years. Molde finished 12th in the league and had to play in the relegation playoff against Moss, which Molde won 5–2 on aggregate. Molde won their second Norwegian Cup title on 6 November 2005 when they won 4–2 after extra time against Lillestrøm in the final. Bo Johansson left Molde after only one season with the club, and on Christmas Eve, Arild Stavrum was announced as the new head coach.

Following the Norwegian Cup champions, Molde played in the 2006–07 UEFA Cup. On 25 August 2006, they were drawn to face Scottish giants Rangers in the first round. They were eliminated 2–0 on aggregate after holding Rangers to a 0–0 draw at the Aker Stadion. The same year, Molde was relegated, having been in the relegation zone for the last four seasons. The relegation became final after losing 8–0 against Stabæk at Nadderud in the second-last match of the season. Arild Stavrum was fired at the end of the season.

=== A new era (2007–present) ===
In December 2006, Kjell Jonevret became head coach after Stavrum was fired, though Ove Christensen was the club's first choice. With Jonevret as coach, Molde won the 2007 1. divisjon and was again promoted back to the top flight. After the promotion to Tippeligaen, Molde recorded a 5–1 win against Vålerenga on the last day of Moldejazz 2008, as well as eliminating Brann from the cup with an impressive 8–0 win at home four days later. Regardless of these strong results, Molde finished ninth in their comeback season in the top flight.

In the 2009 season, Molde was again the second-best team in Norway, behind champions Rosenborg, who that season overtook Molde's 1998 unbeaten streak record. Conversely, Molde ruined Rosenborg's march for a possible double with a 5–0 win at Aker Stadion in the quarter-final of the 2009 Norwegian Cup. In the final, Molde met their local rivals Aalesunds FK, where Aalesund won the Norwegian Championship on penalty shoot-out after the score ended 2–2 after extra time. After collecting only 20 points during the first 22 matches in the 2010 Tippeligaen, Jonevret was sacked and replaced by Uwe Rösler. Under Röslers management, Molde collected 20 points in the last eight matches and avoided relegation. Despite the poor performance by the team, Baye Djiby Fall, who spent the season on loan from Lokomotiv Moscow, became the first Molde player since Jan Fuglset in 1976 to be the top goalscorer in Eliteserien.

Prior to the club's 100-year anniversary in 2011, former Molde and Manchester United player Ole Gunnar Solskjær returned to Molde to manage the club. In the opening match of 2011 Tippeligaen, his first competitive match, Molde lost 3–0 away against newly promoted Sarpsborg 08. On 19 June 2011, Molde celebrated their anniversary with a 2–0 win against Sogndal and positioned themselves at the top of the league table. Molde was leading the league until they eventually won their first championship on 30 October 2011, when Rosenborg, the only team that could mathematically have still beaten them to first place with two matches remaining, lost 6–3 at home to Brann. Molde successfully defended their title in 2012 by beating Hønefoss 1–0 on 11 November, with one match remaining in the season. Although Molde could only finish sixth behind champions Strømgodset in the 2013 Tippeligaen, they defeated Rosenborg 4–2 in the 2013 Norwegian Cup final on 24 November to win the Norwegian Cup for the third time in their history. Ole Gunnar Solskjær left the club to sign for Premier League side Cardiff City on 2 January 2014.

Under new manager Tor Ole Skullerud, Molde won their first domestic league and cup double in 2014, however Skullerud was fired in August 2015 due to a run of mediocre results and Solskjær (whose run at Cardiff lasted just nine months) was brought back to the team. On 19 December 2018 Solskjær left the club to join Manchester United as caretaker manager, with club director Øystein Neerland stating that Solskjær left on a loan deal for the remainder of the season. However, Solskjær was signed permanently by Manchester United in March 2019 and Molde's caretaker manager Erling Moe got the manager job on a permanent basis on 29 April. Moe led Molde to their fourth league title in his first full season in charge.

== Kit ==
Molde's club colours are blue shirts, white shorts and white socks, which has become the standard Molde FK home kit. Molde's traditional away colours are the same as for the home kit, but in the opposite order; white shirts, blue shorts and blue socks. All-blue home kits and all-white away kits have been common for Molde to use in European games.

Molde's first shirt sponsor, Opel, agreed for the 1980 season. Following that, several short-term deals was made before a long-term deal was signed with G-Sport in 1992. In 1999, Molde ended their contract with G-Sport and were sponsored by Commit for three seasons. Sparebanken Møre became their shirt sponsor in 2003, a deal first renewed in 2007 worth NOK 20 million over a five-year period. In 2016, the club once again renewed their sponsorship with the savings bank, signing a deal until 2019. In February 2020, Molde and Sparebanken Møre announced that they had agreed to a deal until the end of the 2022 season.

For twelve years in the beginning of the 21st century, from 2002 to the end of 2013, Molde's shirts were supplied by Umbro. In December 2013, Molde signed a four-year deal with Nike starting January 2014.

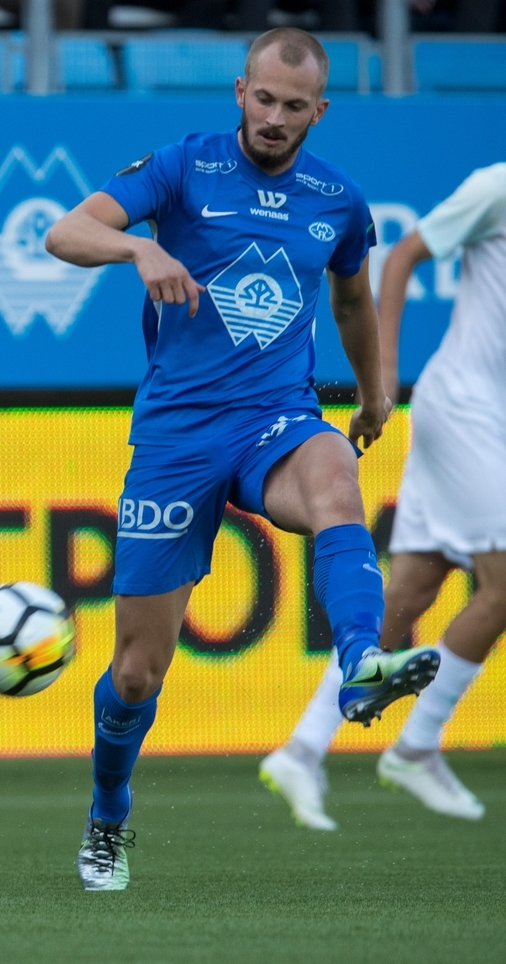
Molde's jersey (worn by Eirik Hestad in 2018) was until 2021 manufactured by Nike, with Sparebanken Møre the shirt sponsor

=== Kit suppliers and shirt sponsors ===
Period	Kit manufacturer	Shirt sponsor
1973–1979	Adidas	none
1980	Hummel	Opel
1981–1982	Hummel	Storebrand
1983–1986	Hummel	Glamox
1987–1989	Hummel	Norsk Tipping
1990	Hummel	DnB
1991	Hummel	Expert
1992–1999	Diadora	G-Sport
2000–2001	Diadora	Commit
2002	Umbro	Commit
2003–2013	Umbro	Sparebanken Møre
2014–2021	Nike	Sparebanken Møre
2022–	Adidas	Sparebanken Møre

== Stadiums ==
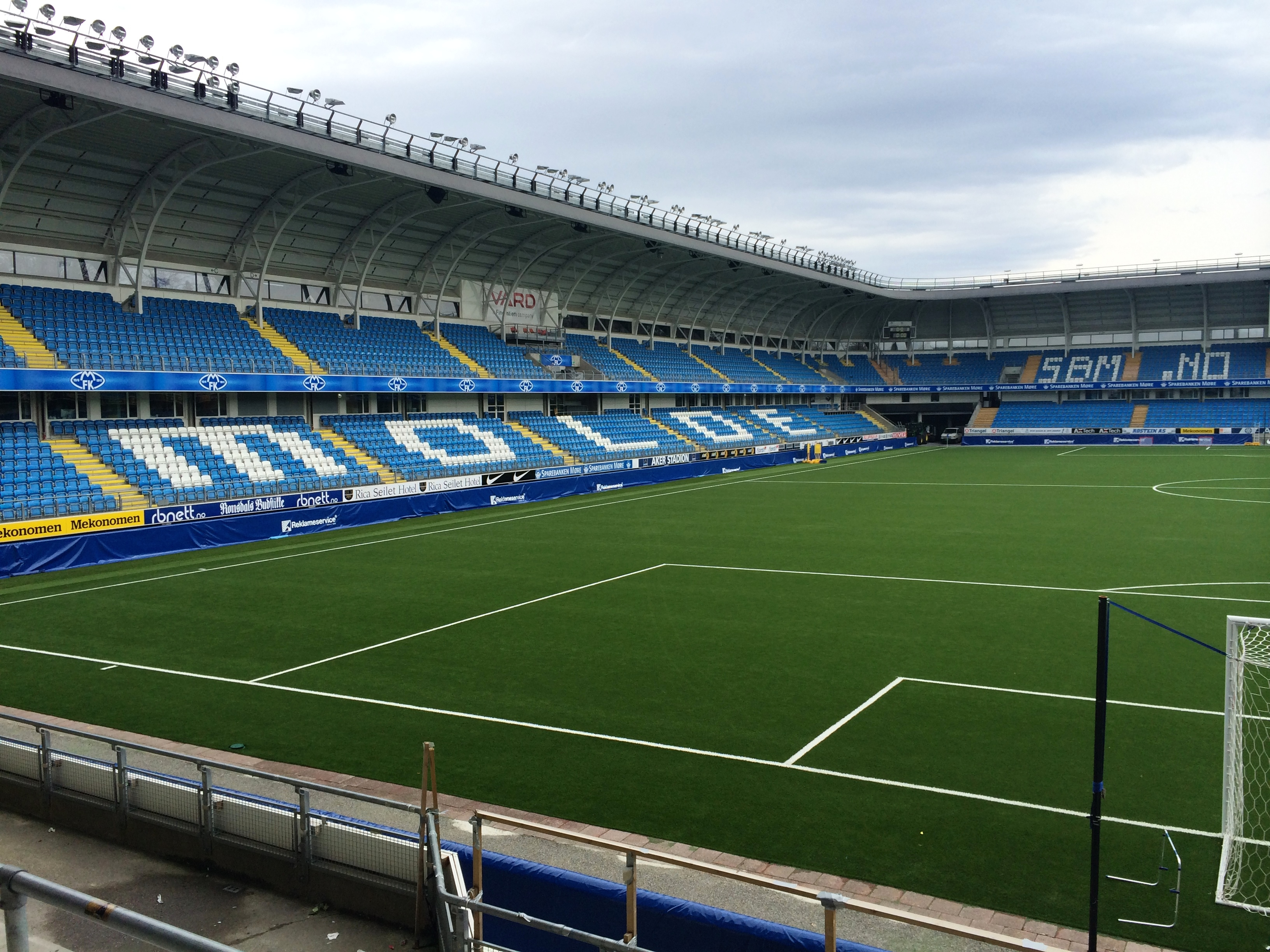
Aker Stadion in 2014

Molde's current stadium is the Aker Stadion, formerly known as Molde Stadion, located at Reknes, by the seashore of central Molde. The 212 million kr cost was mostly paid for by investor Kjell Inge Røkke, after whom the ground has been nicknamed "Røkkeløkka". The official name of the new stadium was Molde Stadion until 3 May 2006, when the stadium name changed to Aker Stadion following a sponsorship deal with Røkke's company Aker. The stadium was inaugurated on 18 April 1998, when the stadium was officially opened by Prime Minister and Molde fan Kjell Magne Bondevik. In the opening match, Molde defeated Lillestrøm 4–0 in their first home match of the season, attracting 13,010 spectators. Tommy Berntsen scored the first goal on Aker Stadion with an own goal, while Daniel Berg Hestad was the first Molde player to score a goal at the new stadium. The all-time attendance record was set on 26 September when Molde hosted Rosenborg in front of 13,308 people. When Molde qualified for the 1999–2000 UEFA Champions League group stage, the stadium was converted to an all-seater, with seats being installed on the lower sections of the short end stands. This reduced the attendance capacity permanently because the club chose not to remove the seats afterwards. Today the capacity of Aker Stadion is 11,249.

Before moving to Aker Stadion in the beginning of the 1998 season, Molde had been playing their home matches at Molde Idrettspark (at the time called Molde stadion), a municipal-owned multi-use venue, since 1955. Molde Idrettspark was inaugurated on 28 August 1955, when Kristiansund was defeated 1–0. About 2,500 spectators attended the inaugural match. The first top-tier league match was played here on 28 July 1957, when Molde managed a 1–1 draw against Sandefjord in the first round of 1957–58 Norwegian Main League. When Molde earned a promotion to the 1974 1. divisjon, the main stand was expanded. The unsurpassed record attendance at Molde Idrettspark is 14,615 in a match against Moss in 1987. Today, Molde Idrettspark is used by Træff and Molde 2.

== Support ==
Molde's supporter club is Tornekrattet (English: "The thicket of thorns"). The name Tornekrattet is a reference to the city's nickname "Rosenes by" (English: "The Town of Roses") and was founded after the 1994 Norwegian Football Cup final victory.

=== Rivalries ===
Molde has their strongest rivalry with Rosenborg. Other rivals are Møre og Romsdal neighbours Aalesund and Kristiansund.

The rivalry with Rosenborg arises from the numerous times the two teams have battled for the Eliteserien title. With 29 titles between them, this fixture has become known as one of the finest Eliteserien match-ups.

== Players ==
=== Current squad ===
As of 18 August 2026

Note: Flags indicate national team as defined under FIFA eligibility rules; some limited exceptions apply. Players may hold more than one non-FIFA nationality.

No.	Pos.	Nation	Player
1	GK	DEN	Mads Kikkenborg
4	DF	NOR	Sivert Sira Hansen
5	FW	NOR	Eirik Hestad
6	MF	NOR	Niklas Ødegård
8	DF	NOR	Mathias Fjørtoft Løvik
9	FW	GHA	Jalal Abdullai
10	MF	NOR	Emil Breivik (captain)
11	FW	CIV	Caleb Zady Sery
12	GK	NOR	Peder Hoel Lervik
15	MF	NOR	Vebjørn Hoff
16	FW	NOR	Sander Kilen
17	MF	NOR	Mats Møller Dæhli
18	DF	NOR	Halldor Stenevik
19	DF	NOR	Eirik Haugan

No.	Pos.	Nation	Player
20	FW	NOR	Kristian Lonebu
21	FW	NOR	Oskar Spiten-Nysæter
22	GK	POL	Albert Posiadała
23	MF	NOR	Sondre Granaas
24	FW	IRL	Trent Koné-Doherty
25	DF	NOR	Martin Linnes
26	DF	RSA	Samukele Kabini
27	DF	NOR	Fredrik Kristensen Dahl
28	MF	DEN	Viktor Bender
29	FW	SEN	Seydina Diop
30	MF	NGR	Daniel Daga
32	GK	NOR	Mads Myklebust
33	DF	NOR	Birk Risa
44	FW	NOR	Igor Gosik

=== Out on loan ===
Note: Flags indicate national team as defined under FIFA eligibility rules; some limited exceptions apply. Players may hold more than one non-FIFA nationality.

No.	Pos.	Nation	Player
7	MF	NOR	Andreas Tveiten (at Brattvåg)
14	MF	DEN	Jacob Steen Christensen (at Sønderjyske)
31	MF	KOS	Blerton Isufi (at HamKam)
36	FW	NOR	Magnus Fjørtoft Løvik (at Træff)
46	MF	NOR	Mathias Mork (at Træff)
52	DF	DEN	Valdemar Lund (at Vejle)

For season transfers, see 2026 Molde FK season.

=== Player records ===
All current players are in bold

==== Most matches played ====
The following is a list of the ten Molde players with the most appearances in the top division.

No.	Player	Years	Apps
1	Daniel Berg Hestad	1993–2003, 2005–2015	473
2	Vegard Forren	2007–2013, 2013–2017, 2017–2019	286
3	Mattias Moström	2007–2020	272
4	Magne Hoseth	1999–2004, 2006–2014	260
5	Ulrich Møller	1980–1994	250
6	Stein Olav Hestad	1971–1989	249
7	Trond Strande	1991–2007	238
8	Morten Bakke	1991–2001	235
9	Magnus Wolff Eikrem	2011–2013, 2018–2025	233
10	Etzaz Hussain	2012–2015, 2017–2022	202

Last updated: 9 January 2025

==== Most goals scored ====
The following is a list of the twelve Molde players who have scored the most top division goals.

No.	Player	Years	Goals
1	Magne Hoseth	1999–2004, 2006–2014	84
2	Daniel Berg Hestad	1993–2003, 2005–2015	72
3	Magnus Wolff Eikrem	2011–2013, 2018–2025	58
4	Jan Fuglset	1973–1982	57
5	Ohi Omoijuanfo	2019–2021	54
6	Ole Bjørn Sundgot	1991–1999	47
7	Andreas Lund	1996–2000	42
8	Odd Inge Olsen	1996–2001	41
9	Øystein Neerland	1987–1993	35
10	Pape Paté Diouf	2006–2011, 2012, 2014–2016	34
10	Daniel Chima Chukwu	2010–2014; 2018–2019	34

Last updated: 9 January 2025

=== Player of the season ===
Molde FK Player of the season (1983–2013)
Season	Name	Nationality	Position	Notes	Ref
1983	Jan Berg	Norway	Midfielder	RB-kruset (Awarded by newspaper Romsdals Budstikke)	
1984	Inge Bratteteig	Norway	Goalkeeper	RB-kruset	
1985	Inge Bratteteig	Norway	Goalkeeper	RB-kruset	
1986	Ulrich Møller	Norway	Defender	RB-kruset	
1987	Ulrich Møller	Norway	Defender	RB-kruset	
1988	Thor André Olsen	Norway	Goalkeeper	RB-kruset	
1989	Thor André Olsen	Norway	Goalkeeper	RB-kruset	
1990	Thor André Olsen	Norway	Goalkeeper	RB-kruset	
1991	Øyvind Leonhardsen	Norway	Midfielder	RB-kruset	
1992	Ulrich Møller	Norway	Defender	RB-kruset	
1993	Morten Bakke	Norway	Goalkeeper	RB-kruset	
1994	Morten Bakke	Norway	Goalkeeper	RB-kruset	
1995	Petter Rudi	Norway	Midfielder	RB-kruset	
1996	Petter Christian Singsaas	Norway	Defender	RB-kruset	
1997	Morten Bakke	Norway	Goalkeeper	RB-kruset	
1998	Trond Andersen	Norway	Defender	RB-kruset	
1999	Andreas Lund	Norway	Forward	RB-kruset	
2000	Odd Inge Olsen	Norway	Midfielder	RB-kruset	
2001	Daniel Berg Hestad	Norway	Midfielder	RB-kruset	
2002	Eddie Gustafsson	Sweden	Goalkeeper	RB-kruset	
2003	Magnus Kihlberg	Sweden	Midfielder	RB-kruset	
2004	Petter Rudi	Norway	Midfielder	RB-kruset	
2005	Daniel Berg Hestad	Norway	Midfielder	RB-kruset	
2006	Petter Christian Singsaas	Norway	Defender	RB-kruset	
2007	Daniel Berg Hestad	Norway	Midfielder	RB-kruset	
2008	Vegard Forren	Norway	Defender	RB-kruset	
2009	Makhtar Thioune	Senegal	Midfielder	RB-kruset	
2010	Magne Hoseth	Norway	Midfielder	RB-kruset	
2011	Espen Bugge Pettersen	Norway	Goalkeeper	RB-kruset	
2012	Magnus Wolff Eikrem	Norway	Midfielder	RB-kruset	
2013	Martin Linnes	Norway	Defender	Decided by Molde players and staff	

2014–
Season	Name	Nationality	Position	Notes	Ref
2014	Vegard Forren	Norway	Defender	RB-kruset	
2015	Mohamed Elyounoussi	Norway	Midfielder	RB-kruset	
2016	Ruben Gabrielsen	Norway	Defender	Vote on club website	
2017	Björn Sigurðarson	Iceland	Forward	Decided by Molde players and staff	
2018	Eirik Hestad	Norway	Midfielder	RB-kruset	
2019	Magnus Wolff Eikrem	Norway	Midfielder	RB-kruset	
2020	Stian Rode Gregersen	Norway	Defender	RB-kruset	
2021	Fredrik Aursnes	Norway	Midfielder	RB-kruset	
2022	Magnus Wolff Eikrem	Norway	Midfielder	RB-kruset	
2023	Magnus Wolff Eikrem	Norway	Midfielder	RB-kruset	

== Club officials ==
=== Club directors ===
Role	Name
Chairman	Odd Ivar Moen
Managing director	Øystein Neerland
Chief Financial Officer	Odin Holm Olsen
Marketing director	Per Eikrem
Media officer and Match day director	Per Lianes

=== Coaching staff ===
Role	Name
Head coach	(Norway) Sindre Tjelmeland
Assistant coach	(Sweden) Martin Falk
Assistant coach	(Norway) Daniel Berg Hestad
First team coaches	(Sweden) Mario Chavez
Goalkeeping coach	(Norway) Per Magne Misund
Fitness coach	(Norway) Espen Gjøstøl
Analysis manager	(Norway) Petter Rudi
Performance analyst	(Norway) Eric Kirkevold
Chief Scout	(Norway) Espen Sørum Hansen

=== Medical and sport science staff ===
Role	Name
Medical coordinator	(Norway) Lars Håvard Sæbø
Physiotherapist	(Norway) Andreas Ranvik
Manual therapist	(Norway) Rune Roksvåg
Sports rehabilitator	(Norway) Espen Gjøstøl
Doctor	(Norway) Endre Skjølberg
Doctor	(Norway) Kjell Erik Strømskag
Doctor	(Norway) Martin Engeland
Head of sport secretariat	(Norway) Snorre Strand
Equipment manager	(Norway) Asbjørn Outzen
Assistant equipment manager	(Norway) Leif Arne Ness
Sports nutritionist	(Norway) Heidi Holmlund

== Honours ==
Molde are one of the most successful clubs in Norway in terms of trophies won. The club's first trophy was the Norwegian Cup, which it won in 1994. In 2011, the club won its first league title, and won its first double in 2014.

=== Domestic ===
==== League ====
First tier

- Eliteserien (Note: 1. divisjon was the name of the top tier of Norwegian league football from 1963 until 1990. The top tier changed its name to the sponsor-affiliated name Tippeligaen ahead of the 1990 season. The second tier formerly known as 2. divisjon inherited the name 1. divisjon ahead of the 1991 season. The third tier, formerly known as 3. divisjon was named 2. divisjon ahead of the 1991 season and the names of all the lower divisions were adjusted accordingly. Effecting 2017, the top tier is named Eliteserien.)
  - Champions (5): 2011, 2012, 2014, 2019, 2022
  - Runners-up (11): 1974, 1987, 1995, 1998, 1999, 2002, 2009, 2017, 2018, 2020, 2021
  - Third (3): 1977, 1988, 1990

Second tier

- 1. divisjon
  - Winners (3): 1937–38, 1938–39, 1948–49
- Landsdelsserien (Møre)
  - Winners (3): 1953–54, 1955–56, 1956–57
- 2. divisjon/1. divisjon
  - Winners (3): 1973, 1983, 2007

Third tier

- 3. divisjon (Møre)
  - Winners (2): 1969, 1970

==== Cup ====
- Norwegian Cup:
  - Winners (6): 1994, 2005, 2013, 2014, 2021–22, 2023
  - Runners-up (4): 1982, 1989, 2009, 2024

=== Doubles ===
- League and Cup: 2014

=== Non-official ===
- La Manga Cup:
  - Winners (1): 2010

== Records ==
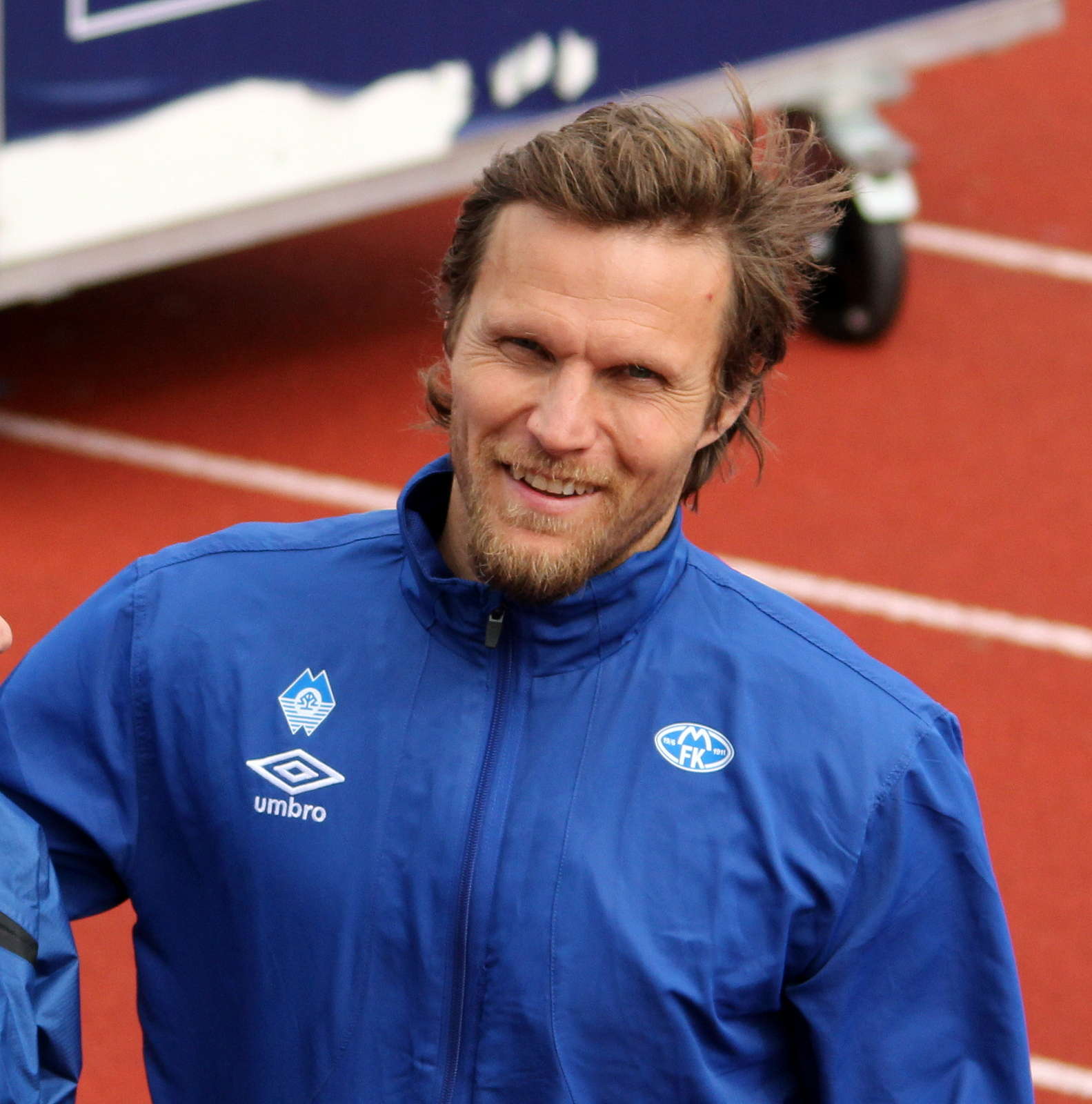
Daniel Berg Hestad holds the club record for competitive appearances with 666.

Accomplishment	Record
Most appearances	Daniel Berg Hestad 666 (900 in total)
Most goals	Jan Fuglset 164
Most goals scored in a league game	6, Jan Fuglset v Strømsgodset in 1976
Longest unbeaten run	24 games in 2014
Greatest victory in Eliteserien	8–0 v Moss in 1996
Heaviest loss in Eliteserien	0–8 v Stabæk in 2006

== European history ==
The following is a list of the all-time statistics from Molde's games in the three UEFA tournaments the club has participated in, as well as the overall total. The list contains the tournament, the number of games played (Pld), won (W), drawn (D) and lost (L). The number of goals scored (GF), goals against (GA), goal difference (GD) and the percentage of matches won (Win%). The statistics include qualification matches and is up to date as of the match against Gent on 3 November 2022.

As of 21 September 2023

Tournament	Pld	W	D	L	GF	GA	GD	Win%
Champions League	33	10	11	12	47	38	+9	30.30
Europa League / UEFA Cup	77	29	18	30	105	99	+6	37.66
UEFA Europa Conference League	16	7	3	6	30	21	+9	43.75
Cup Winners' Cup	4	1	1	2	5	8	−3	25.00
Total	129	47	33	49	185	163	+22	36.43

== Recent history ==
Season	League										Cup	Europe	Top goalscorer (league)	
Season	Division	Pos	G	W	D	L	GS	GA	Pts	Att	Cup	Europe	Name	Goals
2014	Tippeligaen	1	30	22	5	3	62	24	71	9,243	Winner	UEFA Europa League – Third qualifying round	Mohamed Elyounoussi	13
2015	Tippeligaen	6	30	15	7	8	62	31	52	8,952	Quarter-final	UEFA Champions League – Third qualifying round UEFA Europa League – Round of 32	Ola Kamara	14
2016	Tippeligaen	5	30	13	6	11	48	42	45	8,392	Third round		Mohamed Elyounoussi; Harmeet Singh	5
2017	Eliteserien	2	30	16	6	8	50	35	54	7,785	Semi-final		Björn Bergmann Sigurðarson	16
2018	Eliteserien	2	30	18	5	7	63	36	59	7,111	Second round	UEFA Europa League – Play-off round	Erling Haaland	12
2019	Eliteserien	1	30	21	5	4	72	31	68	6,956	Third round	UEFA Europa League – Play-off round	Leke James	17
2020	Eliteserien	2	30	20	2	8	77	36	62	200	Cancelled	UEFA Champions League – Play-off round UEFA Europa League – Round of 16	Leke James	13
2021	Eliteserien	2	30	18	6	6	70	40	60	600	Winner	UEFA Europa Conference League – Third qualifying round	Ohi Omoijuanfo	27
2022	Eliteserien	1	30	25	3	2	71	25	78	6,388	Quarter-final	UEFA Europa Conference League – Group stage	Datro Fofana	15
2023	Eliteserien	5	30	15	6	9	65	39	51	6,681	Winner	UEFA Champions League – Play-off round UEFA Europa League – Group stage UEFA Europa Conference League – Knockout round play-offs	Emil Breivik; Ola Brynhildsen; Magnus Grødem	7
2024	Eliteserien	5	30	15	7	8	64	36	52	7,145	Final	UEFA Europa League – Play-off round	Kristian Eriksen	14
2025	Eliteserien	10	30	12	3	15	46	42	39	7,145	Fourth round		Fredrik Gulbrandsen	7
2026 (in progress)	Eliteserien	5	27	13	5	9	66	48	44	7,145	Fourth round		Kristian Lonebu	15

== List of Molde managers ==
- (Norway) Arne Legernes (player-manager) and Gunnar Talsethagen (1956–1957)
- (Germany) Charlie Pohl (1958)
- (Norway) Gunnar Talsethagen (1959–1961)
- (Norway) Ulf Møller (1962)
- (Norway) Gunnar Talsethagen (1963–1968)
- (Norway) Harry Hestad and Torkild Brakstad (both player-managers) (1969)
- (Norway) Torkild Brakstad (player-manager) (1970–71)
- (Norway) Harry Hestad and Torkild Brakstad (both player-managers) (1972)
- (Norway) Jan Fuglset (player-manager) (1973)
- (England) Joseph Hooley (7 January 1974 – 19 May 1974)
- (Norway) Torkild Brakstad, Jan Fuglset and Harry Hestad (all player-managers) (1974)
- (Denmark) Jack Johnsen (1975)
- (Norway) Torkild Brakstad and Jan Fuglset (both player-managers) (1976)
- (Netherlands) Huib Ruygrook (1 March 1977 – 1979)
- (Norway) Torkild Brakstad (4 January 1980 – 31 December 1981)
- (Norway) Jan Fuglset (player-manager) (11 January 1982 – 21 July 1984)
- (England) Joseph Hooley (22 July 1984 – 31 December 1984)
- (Sweden) Hans Backe (7 January 1985 – 31 December 1985)
- (Norway) Åge Hareide and Harry Hestad (4 January 1986 – 31 December 1989)
- (Norway) Åge Hareide (5 January 1990 – 18 August 1991)
- (Norway) Ulrich Møller (caretaking player-manager) (18 August 1991 – 31 December 1991)
- (Norway) Jan Fuglset and Ulrich Møller (player-manager) (1 January 1992 – 31 December 1993)
- (Norway) Åge Hareide (1 January 1994 – 31 December 1997)
- (Norway) Erik Brakstad (1 January 1998 – 31 October 2000)
- (Sweden) Gunder Bengtsson (1 January 2001 – 22 May 2003)
- (Norway) Odd Berg (caretaker) (22 May 2003 – 31 December 2003)
- (Norway) Reidar Vågnes (1 January 2004 – 5 March 2005)
- (Sweden) Bo Johansson (18 March 2005 – 31 December 2005)
- (Norway) Arild Stavrum (1 January 2006 – 8 November 2006)
- (Sweden) Kjell Jonevret (1 January 2007 – 30 August 2010)
- (Germany) Uwe Rösler (interim) (31 August 2010 – 31 December 2010)
- (Norway) Ole Gunnar Solskjær (10 January 2011 – 2 January 2014)
- (Norway) Tor Ole Skullerud (13 January 2014 – 6 August 2015)
- (Norway) Erling Moe (caretaker) (7 August 2015 – 21 October 2015)
- (Norway) Ole Gunnar Solskjær (21 October 2015 – 18 December 2018)
- (Norway) Erling Moe (19 December 2018 – 8 December 2024)
- (Norway) Trond Strande & Eirik Mæland (joint caretakers) (8 December 2024 – 30 December 2024)
- (Norway) Per-Mathias Høgmo (9 January 2025 – 14 September 2025)
- (Norway) Magne Hoseth (caretaker) (14 September 2025 – 31 December 2025)
- (Sweden) Martin Falk (interim) (21 December 2025 – 24 May 2026)
- (Norway) Sindre Tjelmeland (24 May 2026 – )
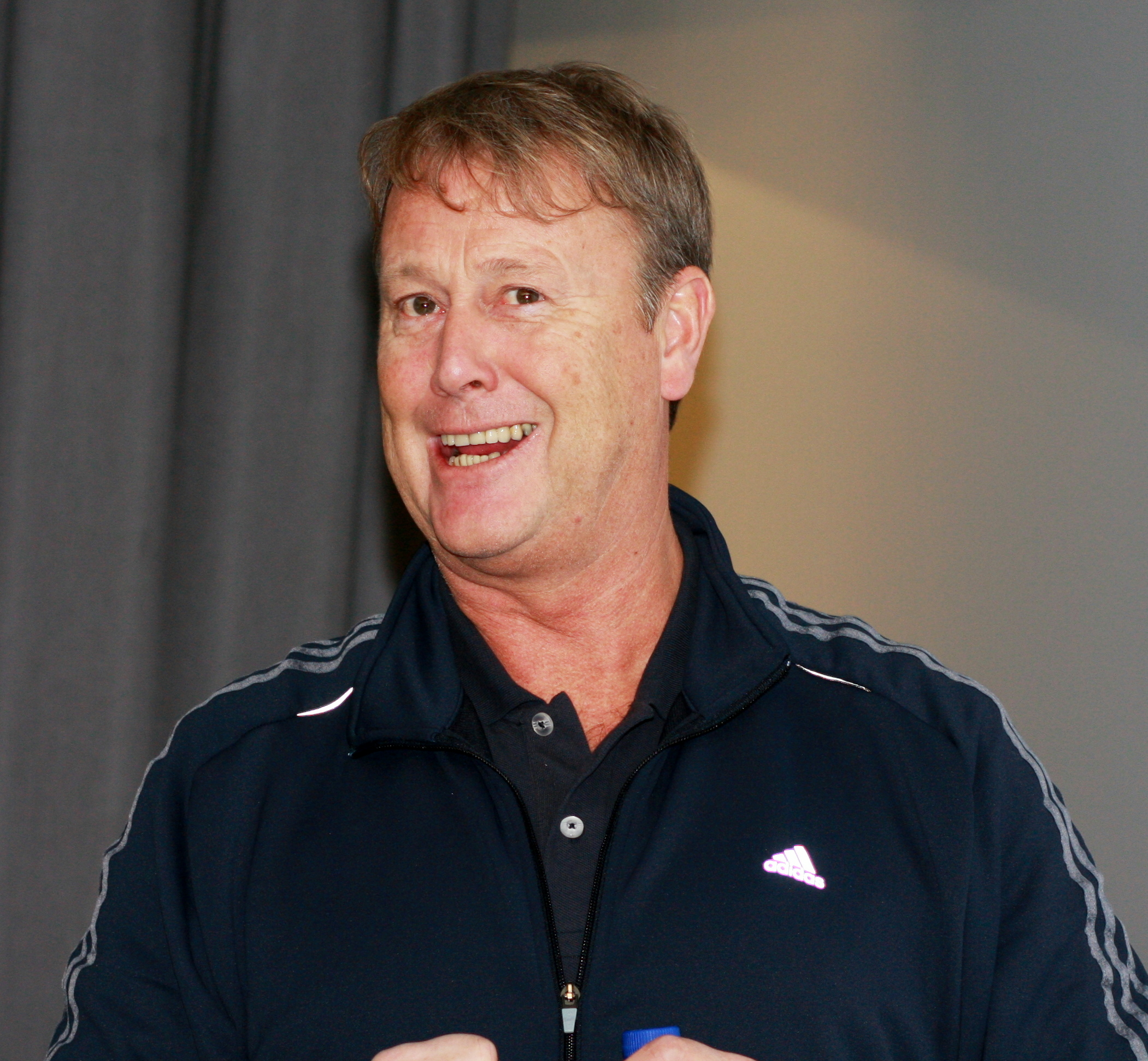
Åge Hareide, head coach 1986–1991, 1994–1997

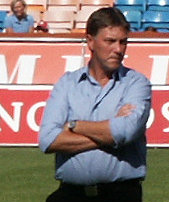
Kjell Jonevret, head coach 2007–2010

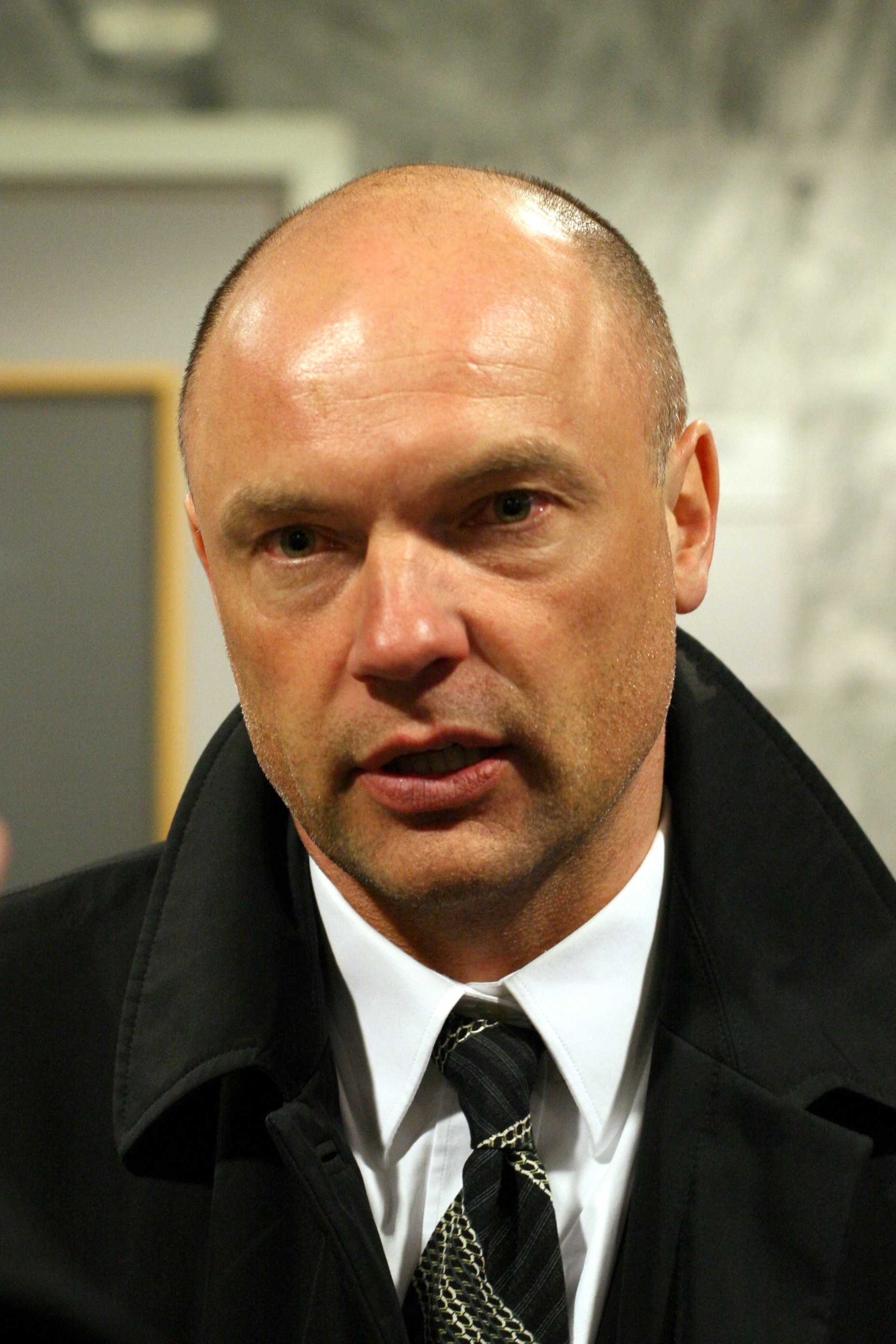
Uwe Rösler, head coach 2010

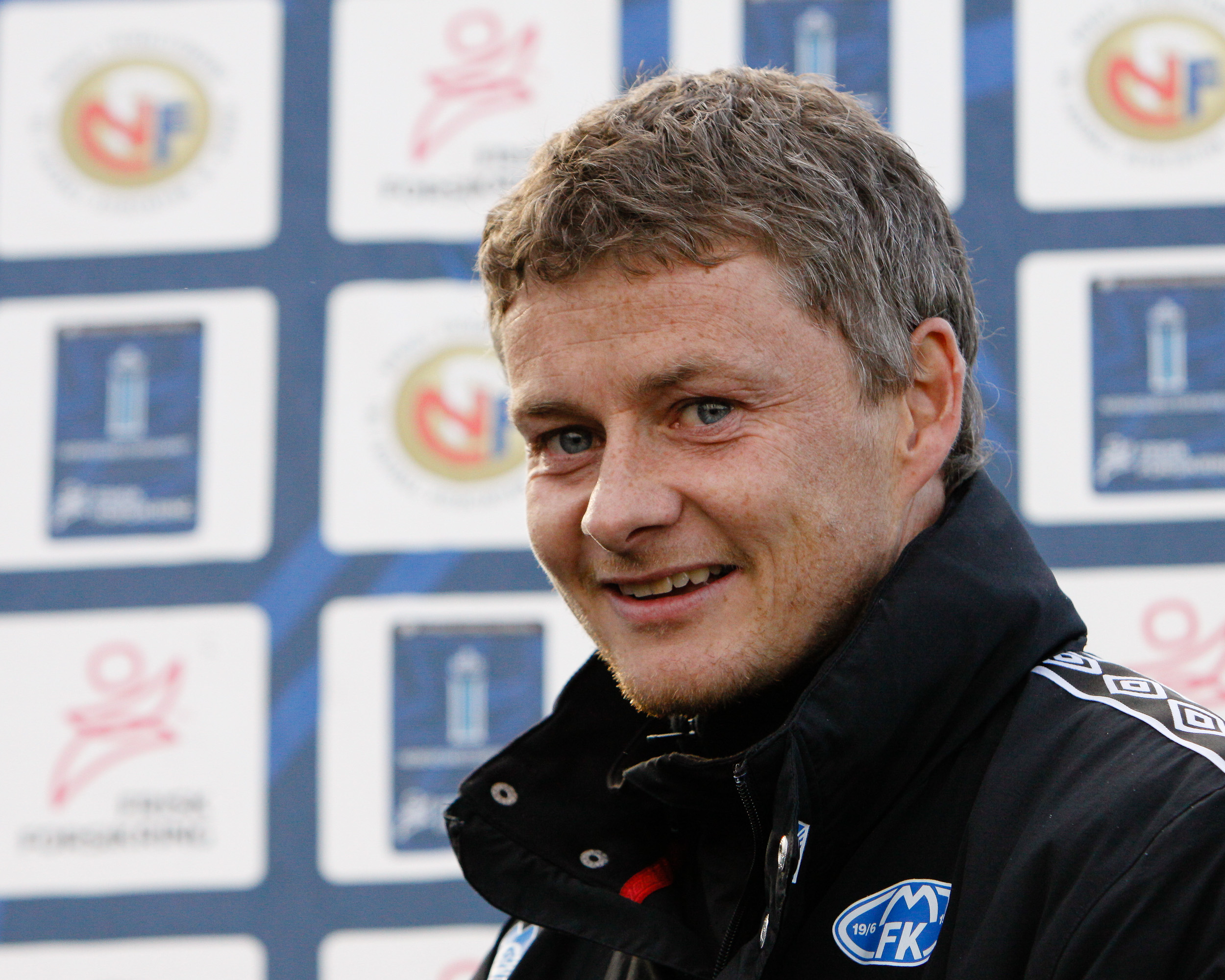
Ole Gunnar Solskjær, manager 2011–2014, 2015–2018

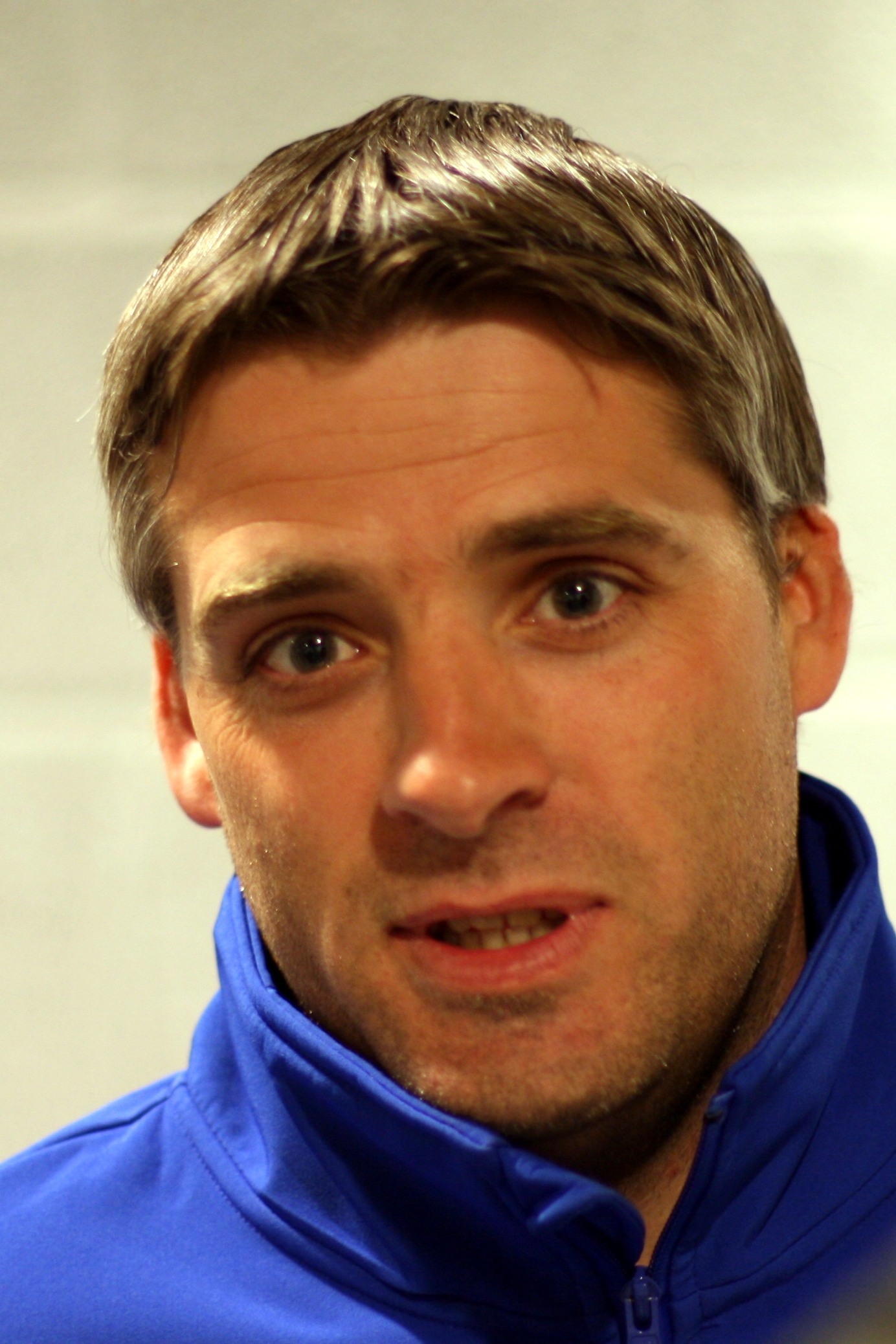
Tor Ole Skullerud, head coach 2014–2015

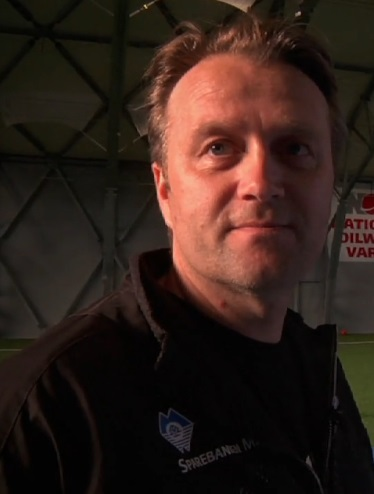
Erling Moe, head coach 2015, 2019–2024

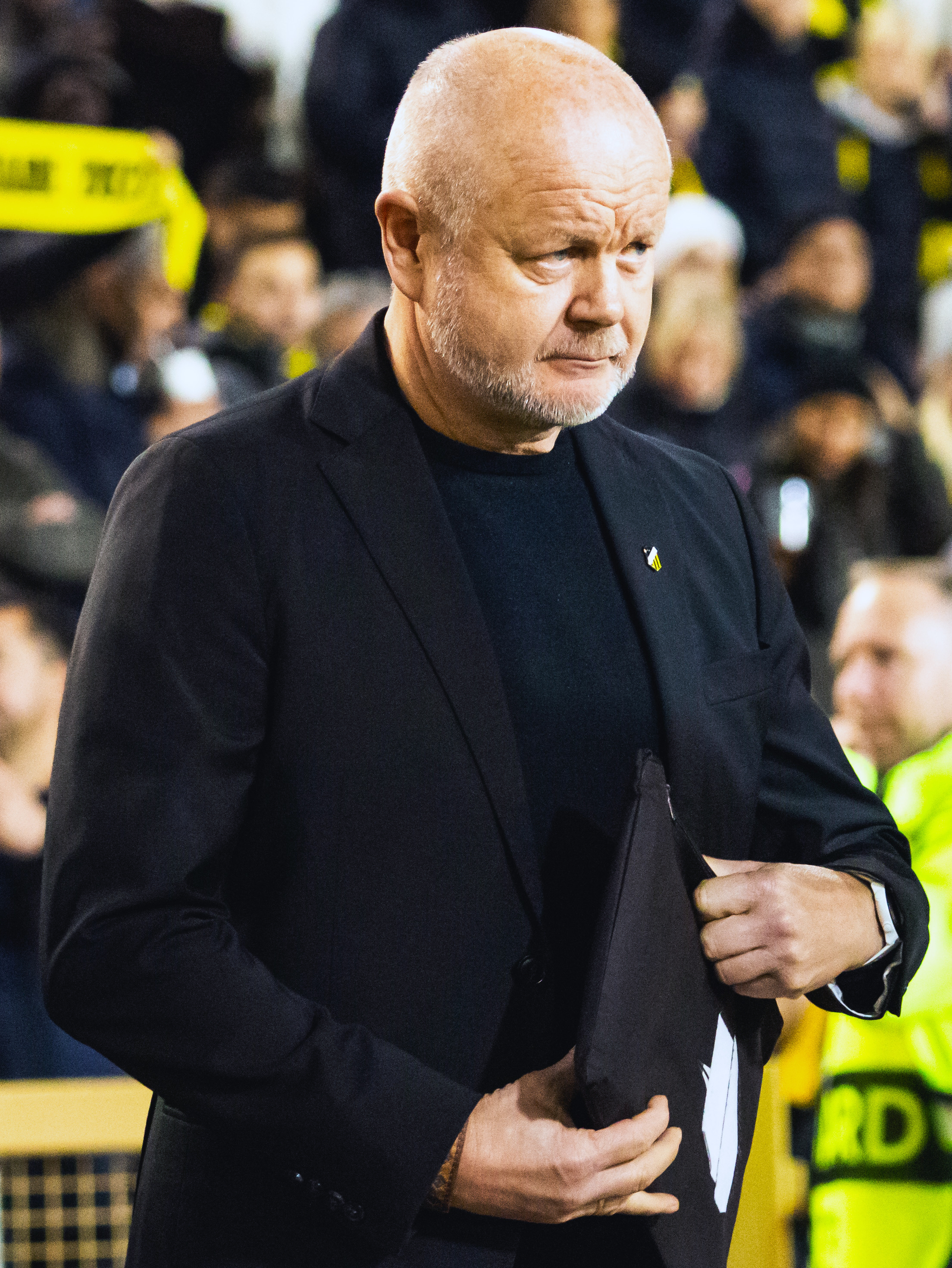
Per-Mathias Høgmo, head coach 2025

== History of league positions (since 1963) ==
	1963– 1970	1971– 1973	1974– 1978	1979	1980	1981	1982	1983	1984– 1993	1994	1995– 2006	2007	2008–
Level 1													
Level 2													
Level 3													

Molde played in the top tier and appeared among the championship contestants in 1947–48 and 1957–58, but the league was differently organized at the top levels until 1963.
