= Samukele Kabini =

South African soccer player (born 2004)

Personal information
- Full name: Samukele Alucious Kabini
- Date of birth: 15 March 2004 (age 22)
- Place of birth: South Africa
- Height: 1.81 m (5 ft 11 in)
- Position: Defender

Team information
- Current team: Molde
- Number: 26

Youth career
- –2023: Orlando Pirates

Senior career*
Years	Team	Apps	(Gls)
2023–2025	TS Galaxy	31	(3)
2025–	Molde	25	(1)

International career^{‡}
2025–	South Africa	8	(1)
- * Club domestic league appearances and goals as of 1 December 2025 ‡ National team caps and goals as of 26 September 2026

Samukele Alucious Kabini (born 15 March 2004) is a South African professional soccer player who plays as a defender for Eliteserien club Molde FK and the South Africa national team.

== Youth career ==
Kabini came through the Orlando Pirates Youth system. He was a vital part of their PSL Reserve League squad and was ready to be promoted before he was poached by TS Galaxy FC in 2023.

== Club career ==
=== TS Galaxy ===
Kabini joined TS Galaxy F.C. in 2023 and made 13 league appearances in his debut season in the South African Top Flight League. He played a further 19 league games before his R15 million move to the Norwegian side, Molde FK in March 2025.

=== Molde ===
On 20 March 2025, Norwegian Eliteserien club Molde announced the signing of Kabini from TS Galaxy on a contract until 2028.

== International career ==
On 1 December 2025, Kabini was called up to the South Africa squad for the 2025 Africa Cup of Nations.

On 28 May 2026, he was selected by manager Hugo Broos to represent his nation at the 2026 FIFA World Cup.

=== International goals ===
As of match played 26 September 2026

Appearances and goals by national team and year
National team	Year	Apps	Goals
South Africa	2026	8	1
Total		8	1

Scores and results list South Africa's goal tally first, score column indicates score after each Kabini goal.

List of international goals scored by Samukele Kabini
No.	Date	Venue	Opponent	Score	Result	Competition
1	26 September 2026	Orlando Stadium, Johannesburg, South Africa	Guinea	2–1	2–1	2027 Africa Cup of Nations qualification
