= Jalal Abdullai =

Ghanaian footballer

Personal information
- Date of birth: 5 January 2005 (age 21)
- Height: 1.86 m (6 ft 1 in)
- Position: Forward

Team information
- Current team: Molde
- Number: 9

Youth career
- –2023: Inter Allies

Senior career*
Years	Team	Apps	(Gls)
2023–2026	Elfsborg	34	(7)
2025	→ Molde (loan)	20	(4)
2026–	Molde	14	(3)
- * Club domestic league appearances and goals as of 13 September 2026

Wolji Jalal Abdullai (born 5 January 2005) is a Ghanaian professional footballer who plays as a forward for Eliteserien club Molde.

== Career ==
Abdullai was brought from Ghanaian club Inter Allies to Sweden in the spring of 2023. Originally training with the U19 team of IF Elfsborg, he was rather quickly promoted to training with the senior team. In July 2023 Elfsborg decided to buy Abdullai. In April 2024, Expressen named Abdullai as the 5th best teenager of Allsvenskan, calling him an "uncut diamond".

His first goal for Elfsborg came in September 2023; a late, deciding goal in a 1–0 victory over Halmstad. He was also sent off in the same game. In May 2024, he was noted for celebrating towards the opposing team's fans, also being yellow-carded for lifting his jersey. In July 2024, he scored after 22 seconds against Mjällby.

During the 2024–25 UEFA Europa League qualifying phase, Abdullai made his debut in continental football, and scored against Rijeka and Pafos. Amid transfer rumours in the summer window of 2024, Abdullai penned a new contract with Elfsborg lasting until 2028. However, in the spring of 2025 he was sent on loan to the Norwegian club Molde FK.

He returned from loan to Elfsborg in time to participate in the 2025-26 Svenska Cupen. At the same time, Molde were "preparing" a bid to sign Abdullai permanently, and this transfer was finalized in early March 2026.
