= Daniel Daga =

Nigerian football player

Personal information
- Full name: Daniel Demenenge Daga
- Date of birth: 10 January 2007 (age 19)
- Position: Midfielder

Team information
- Current team: Molde
- Number: 30

Youth career
- –2022: Carabana

Senior career*
Years	Team	Apps	(Gls)
2022	One Rocket	7	(2)
2022–2023	Dakkada	17	(9)
2023–2025	Enyimba	10	(0)
2025–	Molde	14	(3)

International career^{‡}
2023	Nigeria U20	6	(0)
- * Club domestic league appearances and goals as of 26 July 2026 ‡ National team caps and goals as of 00:15, 07 June 2023 (UTC)

Daniel Demenenge Daga (born 10 January 2007) is a Nigerian professional footballer who plays as a midfielder for Norwegian club Molde FK and the Nigeria national under-20 football team.

== Early life ==
Daga is from Makurdi, Benue State, in central Nigeria.

== Club career ==
Daga was in a football academy at Carabana FC. Daga’s had a breakthrough with the F.C. One Rocket first team in early 2022, competing in the Nigeria National League. That same year Daga then moved to play for Dakkada F.C. in the Nigeria Professional Football League.

He joined Enyimba F.C. in September 2023. Daga made his Nigeria Premier Football League debut on the 8th of October 2023, playing 87 minutes against Gombe United. Enyimba lost the game 2-0.

Daga won the first Infinix Man of the Match award from Enyimba against Kwara United on the 5th of November. He recorded 11 ball recoveries, had 1 big chance created, had 10 successful tackles, won 8 aerial duels, won 7 interceptions and had a 90% pass Accuracy.

He agreed to join Norwegian side Molde FK in 2024.

== International career ==
Daga was man of the match in three of the Nigeria national under-20 football team’s qualifying matches for the 2023 U20 AFCON tournament. Daga played the opening game of the AFCON U20 tournament against Senegal in February 2023. However, a knee injury sustained in the match ruled him out of the tournament.

In May 2023 he was the youngest player selected in the Nigeria squad for the 2023 FIFA U-20 World Cup. He started all Nigeria’s games until they were knocked out of the tournament at the quarter-finals to South Korea U-20. He received praise for his performances at the tournament. His performance in a victory of Italy U-20 at the tournament led to him being labelled a “star in the making”.

In March 2024, he was named in the a Nigeria squad for the delayed 2023 African Games in Ghana.

== Style of play ==
Daga has been described as a holding midfielder and a disruptive, defensively-minded player.

== Personal life ==
On 19 December 2025, Daga was charged with sexual assault relating to an incident in April 2025. In March 2026, Daga was fined 10,000NKr in court fees and sentenced to six months in prison, which Daga appealed. In July 2026 he was acquitted on all counts.

== Career statistics ==
As of match played 2 December 2023

Appearances and goals by club, season and competition
Club	Season	League			National cup (Note: Includes Federation Cup)		Continental		Total	
Club	Season	Division	Apps	Goals	Apps	Goals	Apps	Goals	Apps	Goals
Enyimba	2023–24	Nigeria Premier Football League	10	0	0	0	2	0	12	0
