= Kristian Lonebu =

Norwegian footballer (born 2006)

Personal information
- Full name: Kristian Hemmingsen Lonebu
- Date of birth: 18 February 2006 (age 20)
- Position: Striker

Team information
- Current team: Molde
- Number: 20

Youth career
- –2021: Sykkylven
- 2022–2024: Aalesund

Senior career*
Years	Team	Apps	(Gls)
2023–2025	Aalesund 2	38	(31)
2024–2026	Aalesund	42	(10)
2026–	Molde	8	(10)
- * Club domestic league appearances and goals as of 8 November 2026

Kristian Hemmingsen Lonebu (born 18 February 2006) is a Norwegian professional footballer who plays as a striker for Eliteserien club Molde.

== Career ==
He started his youth career in Sykkylven, moving to Aalesund in 2022. He eventually made his first-team debut in April 2024. Lonebu also performed well for Aalesund's B team in the Third Division. 17 goals in 26 matches in 2024 was followed by 14 goals in 9 matches in 2025. He signed a better contract with Aalesund at the end of 2024.

Lonebu experienced a breakthrough in the latter half of 2025. Following a fourth place in the 2025 1. divisjon, Aalesund reached the promotion playoffs. Their second playoff match pitted Aalesund against 3rd-placed Kongsvinger, which Aalesund won 5–4 away. Lonebu scored Aalesund's fourth goal. Reaching the playoff final, then, Aalesund faced Bryne away. Two goals in the 4–0 victory were following Lonebu involvements, and he was declared man of the match. By early December 2025, he had therefore scored six goals in the last eight matches. He was now being "considered" by bigger clubs including Molde.

== Career statistics ==
As of match played 8 November 2026

Appearances and goals by club, season and competition
Club	Season	League			Norwegian Cup		Other		Total	
Club	Season	Division	Apps	Goals	Apps	Goals	Apps	Goals	Apps	Goals
Aalesund 2	2023	Norwegian Second Division	3	0	—		—		3	0
Aalesund 2	2024	Norwegian Third Division	26	17	—		—		26	17
Aalesund 2	2025	Norwegian Third Division	9	14	—		—		9	14
Aalesund 2	Total		38	31	—		—		38	31
Aalesund	2024	Norwegian First Division	3	0	1	0	—		4	0
Aalesund	2025	Norwegian First Division	23	5	5	2	4 (Note: Appearances in Eliteserien play-offs)	2	32	9
Aalesund	2026	Eliteserien	16	5	2	1	0	0	18	6
Aalesund	Total		42	10	8	3	4	2	54	15
Molde	2026	Eliteserien	8	10	1	0	—		9	10
Career total			89	51	9	3	4	2	102	56
