= Sindre Tjelmeland =

Norwegian football manager (born 1989)

Personal information
- Date of birth: 13 September 1989 (age 37)
- Position: Midfielder

Team information
- Current team: Molde (manager)

Youth career
- 1995–2004: Etne
- 2005–2007: Haugesund

Senior career*
Years	Team	Apps	(Gls)
2005	Etne		
2008	Vard		
2008	Etne		
2009	Havørn		
2010–2011	Sandviken		
2012–2013	Arna-Bjørnar	31	(6)
2014	Åsane	7	(0)
2016	Arna-Bjørnar	4	(0)
2017	Etne		

Managerial career
- 2015–2018: Åsane (youth/developer)
- 2021: Ull/Kisa
- 2021–2023: Start
- 2026–: Molde
- * Club domestic league appearances and goals

Sindre Tjelmeland (born 13 September 1989) is a Norwegian professional football manager who is currently the manager of Eliteserien club Molde.

== Early life & playing career ==
Tjelmeland hails from Etne Municipality and started playing as a child in Etne IL. He also made his senior debut, and helped win promotion from the sixth to the fifth tier. In 2005, he moved to attend upper secondary school, and played for the U19 team of Haugesund. Before finishing school, he opted to play for the senior team of Vard. He did not break through there, and instead featured for Etne in the autumn of 2008.

He then did his military service in Stavanger and was contracted to Havørn, but moved to Bergen to study at the Norwegian School of Economics. Here, he was quickly introduced to the local football milieu. Following stints in Sandviken and Arna-Bjørnar — with the latter club he won promotion and played in the 2013 2. divisjon. In 2014, he moved to Åsane, managed by Kjetil Knutsen. Åsane won promotion from the 2014 2. divisjon, whereupon Tjelmeland felt his playing career was fulfilled, and withdrew from the team. He was however asked by Knutsen to pursue a manager career.

== Coaching career ==
Tjelmeland successively became U16 coach, U19 coach and player developer in Åsane while taking the UEFA A Licence. While coaching, Tjelmeland briefly played matches for his old clubs Arna-Bjørnar and Etne. In November 2020, he stated his amibition as to become manager of Haugesund.

In 2019 and 2020, he was Åsane's assistant manager under Morten Røssland. In 2021, he was given his first head coach position in Ull/Kisa of the second tier. However, after only five games of the season, he was bought out of his contract and signed by newly relegated Start.

After spending the first half of 2024 as an assistant manager of IFK Göteborg, on 6 July 2024 Tjelmeland was signed by Polish club Lech Poznań to operate in the same role under recently appointed Niels Frederiksen. During his time in Poznań, Lech won two consecutive Ekstraklasa titles.

On 21 December 2025, Eliteserien side Molde appointed Tjelmeland as their manager on a four-year deal. He joined Molde in May 2026 upon the expiration of his contract with Lech.

== Manager profile ==
Tjelmeland is known for an "Åsane style" of play, with high ball possession. He has gotten a reputation for high dedication. When signing for Ull/Kisa, the managing director of the club called him "a young and completely crazy coach". To Fædrelandsvennen, he stated: "I am a nerd, though. I have somewhat autistic tendencies when it comes to football".

== Personal life ==
He had his first child in 2020, together with Gunnhild Øvernes, a sister of football goalkeeper Lars Øvernes. He graduated from the Norwegian School of Economics.
