= 2025 Molde FK season =

Molde
2025 season
- Chairman: Odd Ivar Moen
- Manager: Per-Mathias Høgmo (until 14 September); Magne Hoseth (Caretaker) (from 14 September)
- Stadium: Aker Stadion
- Eliteserien: 10th
- Norwegian Cup: Fourth Round vs Kristiansund
- 2025–26 Cup: Fourth Round
- UEFA Conference League: Round of 16 vs Legia Warsaw
- Top goalscorer: League: Fredrik Gulbrandsen (7); All: Jalal Abdullai (9)
- Highest home attendance: 9,293 vs Kristiansund (16 May 2025)
- Lowest home attendance: 3,051 vs Shamrock Rovers (13 February 2025)
- Average home league attendance: 6,268 (22 November 2025)
Home colours	Away colours

The 2025 season was Molde's 18th consecutive year in Eliteserien, and their 49th season in the top flight of Norwegian football.

== Season events ==
On 8 January, Molde announced that Mathias Fjørtoft Løvik had left the club to sign for Parma.

On 9 January, Molde announced the appointment of Per-Mathias Høgmo as their new head coach on a two-year contract with an option of a third year. Later on the same day, Molde announced that Anders Hagelskjær had left the club to sign for EFL League One club Wycombe Wanderers.

On 25 January, Molde announced the signing of Daniel Daga from Enyimba.

On 31 January, Molde announced that Harun Ibrahim had left the club to sign permanently for GAIS, and that Alwande Roaldsøy had joined HamKam on loan for the 2025 season.

On 6 March, Molde announced that they had extended their contract with Peder Hoel Lervik until the end of the 2027 season.

On 20 March, Molde announced the signing of Samukele Kabini from TS Galaxy on a contract until 2028.

On 21 March, Molde announced that Leon-Robin Juberg-Hovland had joined Træff on loan for the season.

On 24 March, Molde announced the signing of Caleb Zady Sery from Vojvodina. The following day, 25 March, Andreas Myklebust joined Leon-Robin Juberg-Hovland on loan at Træff for the season.

On 26 March, Molde announced that Frederik Ihler had joined IF Elfsborg on loan for the season, and that Jalal Abdullai had moved in the opposite direction, joinin Molde on loan from IF Elfsborg for the season. Later on the same day, Niklas Ødegård left Molde to sign for Kristiansund.

On 27 March, Peder Hoel Lervik joined IL Hødd on loan for the remainder of the season.

On 28 April, Molde announced that Peder Hoel Lervik had returned from his loan spell with IL Hødd, whilst Mads Myklebust had joined IL Hødd on loan for the remainder of the season.

On 3 June, Peder Hoel Lervik joined Træff on loan.

On 2 July, Filip Kristoffersen joined Notodden on loan for the remainder of the season.

On 14 July, Molde announced the signing of Birk Risa from New York City FC on a contract until the summer of 2028.

On 21 July, Molde announced the signing of Oskar Spiten-Nysæter from Stabæk on a contract until the summer of 2028.

On 29 July, Molde announced the signing of Blerton Isufi from Moss on a contract until the summer of 2029, with Isufi staying at Moss until the end of the season.

On 1 August, Molde announced that Veton Berisha had left the club after his contract was terminated by mutual consent.

On 16 August, Albert Posiadała joined Samsunspor on loan until mid January 2026.

On 18 August, Valdemar Lund joined Vejle on loan until 30 June 2026, with an option to make the move permanent. The following day, 19 August, Mads Enggård also joined Vejle until 30 June 2026.

On 28 August, Molde announced that Alwande Roaldsøy had returned from his loan deal with HamKam.

On 29 August, Molde announced that they had extended their contract with Oskar Spiten-Nysæter until the summer of 2030.

On 1 September, Molde announced that Markus Kaasa had left the club in order to sign for AaB. Also on 1 September, Molde announced the signing of Jacob Steen Christensen from FC Köln, on a contract until 2028.

On 2 September, Molde announced that Martin Bjørnbak had left the club in order to sign for Haugesund, and that they had signed Neraysho Kasanwirjo on loan from Feyenoord for the remainder of the season.

On 9 September, Molde announced that they had decided to recall Blerton Isufi from his loan spell with Moss.

On 14 September, Molde announced that Per-Mathias Høgmo had left his role as head coach by mutual agreement.

On 30 September, Molde announced that Blerton Isufi had joined Sandefjord on loan for the remainder of the season.

On 26 November, Sean McDermott announced that he would retire from the game at the end of the season.

On 27 November, Molde announced that Filip Kristoffersen would leave at the end of the season when his contract expires.

On 29 November, Molde announced that Gustav Nyheim had decided not to renew his contract, which expires at the end of the season, and would leave the club to sign for Lillestrøm.

On 2 December, Molde announced that Andreas Myklebust would leave at the end of the season when his contract expires.

On 9 December, Molde announced that Leon-Robin Juberg-Hovland would leave at the end of the season when his contract expires.

On 10 December, Molde announced that Magnus Wolff Eikrem would leave at the end of the season when his contract expires.

== Squad ==
As of match played 30 November 2025

No.	Name	Nationality	Position	Date of birth (age)	Signed from	Signed in	Contract ends	Apps.	Goals
Goalkeepers
1	Jacob Karlstrøm	(Norway)	GK	9 January 1997 (aged 28)	Tromsø	2022	2025	122	0
34	Sean McDermott	(Republic of Ireland)	GK	30 May 1993 (aged 32)	Unattached	2024	2026	6	0
Defenders
3	Casper Øyvann	(Norway)	DF	7 December 1999 (aged 25)	Tromsø	2023	2026	65	0
6	Isak Amundsen	(Norway)	DF	14 October 1999 (aged 26)	Bodø/Glimt	2024	2027	62	0
19	Eirik Haugan	(Norway)	DF	27 August 1997 (aged 28)	Östersunds	2022	2026	154	6
21	Martin Linnes	(Norway)	DF	20 September 1991 (aged 34)	Unattached	2021	2025	290	29
24	Neraysho Kasanwirjo	(Netherlands)	DF	18 February 2002 (aged 23)	on loan from Feyenoord	2025	2025	8	0
26	Samukele Kabini	(South Africa)	DF	15 March 2004 (aged 21)	TS Galaxy	2025	2028	23	2
33	Birk Risa	(Norway)	DF	13 February 1998 (aged 27)	New York City FC	2025	2028	111	3
58	Daniel Nakken	(Norway)	DF	26 May 2008 (aged 17)	Academy	2025		0	0
Midfielders
5	Eirik Hestad	(Norway)	MF	26 June 1995 (aged 30)	Unattached	2023	2027	311	49
7	Magnus Wolff Eikrem	(Norway)	MF	8 August 1990 (aged 35)	Seattle Sounders FC	2018	2025	353	87
11	Caleb Zady Sery	(Ivory Coast)	MF	20 December 1999 (aged 25)	Vojvodina	2025		19	3
14	Jacob Steen Christensen	(Denmark)	MF	25 June 2001 (aged 24)	FC Köln	2025	2028	6	0
16	Emil Breivik	(Norway)	MF	11 June 2000 (aged 25)	Academy	2014	2027	206	23
17	Mats Møller Dæhli	(Norway)	MF	2 March 1995 (aged 30)	1. FC Nürnberg	2024	2027	87	1
18	Halldor Stenevik	(Norway)	MF	2 February 2000 (aged 25)	Strømsgodset	2024	2027	79	6
20	Kristian Eriksen	(Norway)	MF	18 July 1995 (aged 30)	HamKam	2022	2026	140	36
23	Sondre Granaas	(Norway)	MF	30 August 2006 (aged 19)	Mjøndalen	2024	2026	44	6
27	Daniel Daga	(Nigeria)	MF	10 January 2007 (aged 18)	Enyimba	2025		17	3
28	Alwande Roaldsøy	(Norway)	MF	9 June 2004 (aged 21)	Atalanta	2024	2026	19	1
Forwards
8	Fredrik Gulbrandsen	(Norway)	FW	10 September 1992 (aged 33)	Unattached	2023		116	43
9	Jalal Abdullai	(Ghana)	FW	5 January 2005 (aged 20)	on loan from IF Elfsborg	2025	2025	23	9
25	Oskar Spiten-Nysæter	(Norway)	FW	29 August 2007 (aged 18)	Stabæk	2025	2030	14	3
29	Gustav Nyheim	(Norway)	FW	13 February 2006 (aged 19)	Academy	2021	2025	22	1
Molde II
35	William Fraser	(Norway)	GK	26 January 2002 (aged 23)	Academy	2021		0	0
38	Magnus Solheim	(Norway)	FW	3 March 2005 (aged 20)	Academy	2022		0	0
40	Martin Kjørsvik	(Norway)	FW	17 January 2003 (aged 22)	Academy	2021		1	0
41	Sindre Heggstad	(Norway)	DF	6 April 2003 (aged 22)	Academy	2021		0	0
42	Jesper Myklebust	(Norway)	FW	5 June 2003 (aged 22)	Academy	2022		0	0
46	Mathias Mork	(Norway)	FW	27 July 2007 (aged 18)	Academy	2025	2027	3	0
52	Fredrik Nyheim	(Norway)	DF	2 April 2005 (aged 20)	Academy	2021		0	0
53	Igor Gosik	(Norway)	MF	7 February 2008 (aged 17)	Academy	2025		1	0
55	Emil Silseth	(Norway)	MF	15 September 2005 (aged 20)	Academy	2022		0	0
56	Faveur Ndayizeye	(Norway)	FW	24 April 2008 (aged 17)	Academy	2025		1	0
	Adrian Viken	(Norway)	DF	14 July 2005 (aged 20)	Academy	2021		0	0
	Vegard Myklebust	(Norway)	MF	2 February 2005 (aged 20)	Academy	2022		0	0
Out on loan
4	Valdemar Lund	(Denmark)	DF	28 May 2003 (aged 22)	Copenhagen	2024	2027	50	0
10	Mads Enggård	(Denmark)	MF	20 January 2004 (aged 21)	Randers	2024	2028	39	0
22	Albert Posiadała	(Poland)	GK	25 February 2003 (aged 22)	Radomiak Radom	2024	2027	37	0
30	Leon-Robin Juberg-Hovland	(Norway)	FW	9 May 2004 (aged 21)	Academy	2021	2025	4	1
31	Andreas Myklebust	(Norway)	MF	16 July 2005 (aged 20)	Academy	2021	2025	4	0
32	Peder Hoel Lervik	(Norway)	GK	24 April 2005 (aged 20)	Academy	2021	2027	0	0
36	Filip Kristoffersen	(Norway)	DF	9 March 2004 (aged 21)	Academy	2021	2025	0	0
51	Mads Myklebust	(Norway)	GK	31 July 2007 (aged 18)	Academy	2024		0	0
	Blerton Isufi	(Kosovo)	FW	14 February 2006 (aged 19)	Moss	2025	2029	0	0
Players who left club during season
2	Martin Bjørnbak	(Norway)	DF	22 March 1992 (aged 33)	Bodø/Glimt	2019	2025	166	6
9	Frederik Ihler	(Denmark)	FW	25 June 2003 (aged 22)	Landskrona BoIS	2024	2028	26	7
12	Oliver Petersen	(Norway)	GK	26 September 2001 (aged 24)	Follo	2019	2026	36	0
14	Veton Berisha	(Norway)	FW	13 April 1994 (aged 31)	Hammarby	2023	2026	58	15
15	Markus Kaasa	(Norway)	MF	15 July 1997 (aged 28)	Odd	2022	2025	122	19
24	Johan Bakke	(Norway)	MF	1 April 2004 (aged 21)	Sogndal	2022	2026	22	0
25	Anders Hagelskjær	(Denmark)	DF	16 February 1997 (aged 28)	AaB	2023	2026	73	2
28	Kristoffer Haugen	(Norway)	DF	21 February 1994 (aged 31)	Viking	2018	2025	227	24
31	Mathias Fjørtoft Løvik	(Norway)	DF	6 December 2003 (aged 21)	Academy	2021	2027	108	7
33	Niklas Ødegård	(Norway)	MF	29 March 2004 (aged 21)	Academy	2021	2025	49	6

== Transfers ==
=== In ===
Date	Position	Nationality	Name	From	Fee	Ref.
25 January 2025	MF	(Nigeria)	Daniel Daga	Enyimba	Undisclosed	
20 March 2025	DF	(South Africa)	Samukele Kabini	TS Galaxy	Undisclosed	
24 March 2025	MF	(Ivory Coast)	Caleb Zady Sery	Vojvodina	Undisclosed	
14 July 2025	DF	(Norway)	Birk Risa	New York City FC	Undisclosed	
21 July 2025	FW	(Norway)	Oskar Spiten-Nysæter	Stabæk	Undisclosed	
29 July 2025	FW	(Kosovo)	Blerton Isufi	Moss	Undisclosed	
1 September 2025	MF	(Denmark)	Jacob Steen Christensen	FC Köln	Undisclosed	

=== Loans in ===
Date from	Position	Nationality	Name	From	Date to	Ref.
26 March 2025	FW	(Ghana)	Jalal Abdullai	IF Elfsborg	End of season	
2 September 2025	DF	(Netherlands)	Neraysho Kasanwirjo	Feyenoord	End of season	

=== Out ===
Date	Position	Nationality	Name	To	Fee	Ref.
8 January 2025	DF	(Norway)	Mathias Fjørtoft Løvik	Parma	Undisclosed	
9 January 2025	DF	(Denmark)	Anders Hagelskjær	Wycombe Wanderers	Undisclosed	
31 January 2025	DF	(Sweden)	Harun Ibrahim	GAIS	Undisclosed	
26 March 2025	MF	(Norway)	Niklas Ødegård	Kristiansund	Undisclosed	
27 March 2025	GK	(Norway)	Oliver Petersen	Kolbotn	Undisclosed	
9 July 2025	MF	(Norway)	Johan Bakke	Strømsgodset	Undisclosed	
11 July 2025	FW	(Denmark)	Frederik Ihler	IF Elfsborg	Undisclosed	
12 July 2025	DF	(Norway)	Kristoffer Haugen	Viking	Undisclosed	
1 September 2025	MF	(Norway)	Markus Kaasa	AaB	Undisclosed	
2 September 2025	DF	(Norway)	Martin Bjørnbak	Haugesund	Undisclosed	

=== Loans out ===
Date from	Position	Nationality	Name	To	Date to	Ref.
31 January 2025	MF	(Norway)	Alwande Roaldsøy	HamKam	28 August 2025	
21 March 2025	FW	(Norway)	Leon-Robin Juberg-Hovland	Træff	End of season	
25 March 2025	MF	(Norway)	Andreas Myklebust	Træff	End of season	
26 March 2025	FW	(Denmark)	Frederik Ihler	IF Elfsborg	End of season	
27 March 2025	GK	(Norway)	Peder Hoel Lervik	IL Hødd	28 April 2025	
28 April 2025	GK	(Norway)	Mads Myklebust	IL Hødd	End of season	
3 June 2025	GK	(Norway)	Peder Hoel Lervik	Træff	End of season	
2 July 2025	DF	(Norway)	Filip Kristoffersen	Notodden	End of season	
29 July 2025	FW	(Kosovo)	Blerton Isufi	Moss	9 September 2025	
16 August 2025	GK	(Poland)	Albert Posiadała	Samsunspor	Mid January 2026	
18 August 2025	DF	(Denmark)	Valdemar Lund	Vejle	30 June 2026	
19 August 2025	MF	(Denmark)	Mads Enggård	Vejle	30 June 2026	
30 September 2025	FW	(Kosovo)	Blerton Isufi	Sandefjord	End of season	

=== Released ===
Date	Position	Nationality	Name	Joined	Date	Ref.
1 August 2025	FW	(Norway)	Veton Berisha	Viking	5 August 2025	
31 December 2025	GK	(Republic of Ireland)	Sean McDermott	Retirement		
31 December 2025	GK	(Norway)	Jacob Karlstrøm	Anorthosis Famagusta	9 January 2026	
31 December 2025	DF	(Norway)	Filip Kristoffersen	Træff	22 March 2026	
31 December 2025	MF	(Norway)	Magnus Wolff Eikrem	KFUM	16 February 2026	
31 December 2025	MF	(Norway)	Andreas Myklebust	Brattvåg	28 January 2026	
31 December 2025	FW	(Norway)	Leon-Robin Juberg-Hovland	Kongsvinger	30 January 2026	
31 December 2025	FW	(Norway)	Gustav Nyheim	Lillestrøm	1 January 2026	

== Friendlies ==
20 January 2025	Molde (Norway)	0–1	(Sweden) AIK	Benidorm, Spain
15:00 CET (UTC+1)		Report	Gono 85'	Stadium: Meliá Villaitana Football Center

28 January 2025	Molde	6–0	Træff	Molde
18:30 CET (UTC+1)	Gulbrandsen 31', 34', 38'; Eriksen 41'; Ihler 55'; Juberg-Hovland 80'	Report		Stadium: Aker Stadion

1 February 2025	Molde (Norway)	1–2	(Republic of Ireland) St Patrick's Athletic	Estepona, Spain
11:30 CET (UTC+1)	Ihler 40'	Report	McClelland 3'; Mulraney 67'	Stadium: Estepona Football Centre

6 February 2025	Molde (Norway)	1–0	(Sweden) Hammarby	Málaga, Spain
16:00 CET (UTC+1)	Daga 84'	Report		Stadium: Banus Football Center

27 February 2025	Molde	1–1	Ranheim	Molde
15:00 CET (UTC+1)	Gulbrandsen 9'	Report	Bye 69'	Stadium: Aker Stadion

15 March 2025	Molde	0–4	Kristiansund	Molde
13:00 CET (UTC+1)	(yellow card) 32'	Report	Alte 33' (pen.); Badou 43', 49', 64'; (yellow card) 59'	Stadium: Aker Stadion

22 March 2025	Molde	1–2	Bodø/Glimt	Molde
16:00 CET (UTC+1)	Goal	Report	Goal	Stadium: Aker Stadion

15 June 2025	Molde	2–3	Värnamo	Jessheim
19:30 CET (UTC+1)	Gulbrandsen 42'; Berisha 62'	Report	Zeljković 53'; Antonsson 60'; Alsalkhadi 69'	Stadium: Jessheim Stadion

8 October 2025	Molde	0–0	Aalesunds	Molde
13:00 CET (UTC+1)		Report		Stadium: Aker Stadion

== Competitions ==
=== Overview ===
Competition	First match	Last match	Starting round	Final position	Record							
Competition	First match	Last match	Starting round	Final position	Pld	W	D	L	GF	GA	GD	Win %
Eliteserien	30 March 2025	30 November 2025	Matchday 1	10th	30	12	3	15	46	42	+4	40.00
2025 Norwegian Cup	13 April 2025	21 May 2025	First round	Fourth round	4	2	1	1	15	5	+10	50.00
2025–26 Norwegian Cup	24 September 2025	See 2026 Season	Third round	See 2026 Season	1	0	1	0	1	1	+0	0.00
UEFA Conference League	13 February 2025	13 March 2025	2024 season	Round of 16	4	2	0	2	4	5	−1	50.00
Total					39	16	5	18	66	53	+13	41.03

Last updated: 30 November 2025
Source: Competitions

=== UEFA Europa Conference League ===
==== Knockout phase ====
13 February 2025 Knockout round play-offs 1st leg	Molde (Norway)	0–1	(Republic of Ireland) Shamrock Rovers	Molde, Norway
18:45 CET (UTC+1)	Breivik (yellow card) 36'; Lund (red card) 42'; Haugan (yellow card) 48'; Stenevik (yellow card) 79'	Report	Mandroiu (yellow card) 37'; Watts (yellow card) 45+1'; M. Noonan 57'; Cleary (yellow card) 81'	Stadium: Aker Stadion; Attendance: 3,051; Referee: Andris Treimanis (Latvia)

20 February 2025 Knockout round play-offs 2nd leg	Shamrock Rovers (Republic of Ireland)	0–1 (a.e.t.) (1–1 agg.) (4–5 p)	(Norway) Molde	Dublin, Republic of Ireland
21:00 CET (UTC+1)	Grace (yellow card) 72'; C.O'Sullivan (yellow card) 107'; Greene (yellow card) 107'; McEneff (yellow card) 110'	Report	Eikrem 10'; Haugan (yellow card) 66'; Amundsen (yellow card) 69' (yellow-red card) 90+3'	Stadium: Tallaght Stadium; Attendance: 9,533; Referee: Anastasios Sidiropoulos (Greece)
	Penalties
	Healy (penalty scored); M. Noonan (penalty scored); Greene (penalty missed); J. O'Sullivan (penalty scored); McEneff (penalty scored)		(penalty scored) Ihler; (penalty scored) Stenevik; (penalty scored) Enggård; (penalty scored) Daga; (penalty scored) Hestad

6 March 2025 Round of 16 1st leg	Molde (Norway)	3–2	(Poland) Legia Warsaw	Molde, Norway
18:45 CET (UTC+1)	Hestad 11'; Stenevik (yellow card) 13'; Eriksen 17'; Gulbrandsen 43'	Report	Ziółkowski (yellow card) 50'; Chodyna 64'; Luquinhas 67' (yellow card) 89'	Stadium: Aker Stadion; Attendance: 4,098; Referee: Horațiu Feșnic (Romania)

13 March 2025 Round of 16 2nd leg	Legia Warsaw (Poland)	2–0 (a.e.t.) (4-3 agg.)	(Norway) Molde	Warsaw, Poland
21:00 CET (UTC+1)	Morishita 34'; Jędrzejczyk (yellow card) 62' (red card) 120+1'; Gual 108'; Ziółkowski (yellow card) 120'	Report	Lund (yellow card) 114'; Eriksen (red card) 116'; Karlstrøm (yellow card) 120'; Eikrem (yellow card) 120'	Stadium: Polish Army Stadium; Attendance: 26,153; Referee: Matej Jug (Slovenia)

=== Eliteserien ===
==== Results summary ====
Overall								Home						Away					
Pld	W	D	L	GF	GA	GD	Pts	W	D	L	GF	GA	GD	W	D	L	GF	GA	GD
30	12	3	15	46	42	+4	39	8	1	6	29	19	+10	4	2	9	17	23	−6

Last updated: 30 November 2025.
Source: see below

==== Results by match ====
Match	1	2	3	4	5	6	7	8	15	9	10	11	12	13	14	16	17	18	19	20	21	22	23	24	25	26	27	28	29	30
Ground	H	A	H	A	H	A	H	A	A	H	A	H	A	A	H	H	H	A	H	A	H	A	H	A	H	A	H	A	H	A
Result	L	L	D	D	W	W	L	L	W	L	W	L	L	L	W	W	W	D	W	L	L	L	W	L	L	L	W	W	W	L
Position	15	15	15	15	11	9	11	12	13	12	10	10	12	13	13	11	9	9	8	10	11	11	8	11	12	13	12	9	8	10

Updated to match(es) played on 30 November 2025. Source: see below
A = Away; H = Home; W = Win; D = Draw; L = Loss

==== Results ====
30 March 2025 1	Molde	0–2	Sarpsborg 08	Molde
17:00 CEST (UTC+2)	Stenevik (yellow card) 37'; Abdullai (yellow card) 68'; Granaas (yellow card) 78'	Report	Karlsbakk 5', 63' (pen.); Berget (yellow card) 18'; Reinhardsen (yellow card) 90+7'	Stadium: Aker Stadion; Attendance: 5,829; Referee: Daniel Higraff

6 April 2025 2	Sandefjord	3–0	Molde	Sandefjord
17:00 CEST (UTC+2)	Sigurðarson 23', 41' (yellow card) 61'; Gjone (yellow card) 27'; Mørk (yellow card) 35'; Jemal 80'	Report	Enggård (yellow card) 55'; Linnes (yellow card) 68'; Daga (yellow card) 90+5'	Stadium: Sandefjord Arena; Attendance: 4,640; Referee: Kristoffer Hagenes

21 April 2025 3	Molde	2–2	Bodø/Glimt	Molde
19:15 CEST (UTC+2)	Haugan (yellow card) 10'; Enggård (yellow card) 28'; Breivik (yellow card) 63'; Berisha 78'; Sjøvold 85' (o.g.)	Report	Haugan 34' (o.g.); Määttä (yellow card) 39'; Sjøvold 44'	Stadium: Aker Stadion; Attendance: 6,940; Referee: Rohit Saggi

27 April 2025 4	Rosenborg	0–0	Molde	Trondheim
14:30 CEST (UTC+2)	Zeidan (yellow card) 89'	Report	Linnes (yellow card) 74'; Stenevik (yellow card) 81'	Stadium: Lerkendal Stadion; Attendance: 21,263; Referee: Espen Eskås

4 May 2025 5	Molde	2–1	Haugesund	Molde
17:00 CEST (UTC+2)	Eriksen (yellow card) 16' (goal) 43'; Abdullai (yellow card) 67' (goal) 90+6'	Report	Dia (yellow card) 18' (goal) 90'; Rohd (yellow card) 25'; Eskesen (yellow card) 32'; Leite (yellow card) 45'	Stadium: Aker Stadion; Attendance: 5,286; Referee: Stian Røvig Sletner

11 May 2025 6	Bryne	0–3	Molde	Bryne
17:00 CEST (UTC+2)	Kryger (yellow card) 59'; Larsen (yellow card) 61'	Report	Breivik 19', 39' (yellow card) 71'; Eriksen 37'	Stadium: Bryne Stadion; Attendance: 2,893; Referee: Kristoffer Hagenes

16 May 2025 7	Molde	0–1	Kristiansund	Molde
18:00 CEST (UTC+2)	Berisha (penalty missed) 61'; Gulbrandsen (yellow card) 85'	Report	Igor 21'; Corlu (yellow card) 82'	Stadium: Aker Stadion; Attendance: 9,293; Referee: Sigurd Kringstad

25 May 2025 8	HamKam	2–1	Molde	Hamar
14:30 CEST (UTC+2)	Roaldsøy 23'; Strand Nilsen 52'; Ekeroth (yellow card) 72'	Report	Berisha 46'; Lund (yellow card) 88'	Stadium: Briskeby Stadion; Attendance: 3,008; Referee: Rohit Saggi

29 May 2025 15	Brann	0–3	Molde	Bergen
18:00 CEST (UTC+2)	Soltvedt (yellow card) 45+3'; Myhre (yellow card) 55'; Helland (yellow card) 82'	Report	Gulbrandsen 11' (yellow card) 32'; Breivik (yellow card) 39'; Enggård (yellow card) 45' (yellow-red card) 90+1'; Eriksen 48'; Karlstrøm (yellow card) 55'; Kabini (yellow card) 60'; Berisha 72' (red card) 83'; Hestad (yellow card) 76'; Granaas (yellow card) 84'	Stadium: Brann Stadion; Attendance: 17,002; Referee: Mohammad Usman Aslam

1 June 2025 9	Molde	0–1	Viking	Molde
19:15 CEST (UTC+2)	Haugan (yellow card) 30'; Stenevik (yellow card) 51'	Report	Falchener 3'; Haugen (yellow card) 74'; Christiansen (penalty missed) 76'; Askildsen (yellow card) 90'	Stadium: Aker Stadion; Attendance: 5,429; Referee: Ola Hobber Nilsen

22 June 2025 10	Vålerenga	2–3	Molde	Oslo
14:30 CEST (UTC+2)	Thorvaldsen 23'; Ambina 42'; Lange (yellow card) 60'	Report	Eikrem 7'; Stenevik (yellow card) 52'; Enggård (yellow card) 58'; Daga 80'; Gulbrandsen 84'; Breivik (yellow card) 90+4'	Stadium: Intility Arena; Attendance: 13,592; Referee: Tore Hansen

29 June 2025 11	Molde	2–3	KFUM Oslo	Molde
17:00 CEST (UTC+2)	Daga (yellow card) 18'; Karlstrøm (yellow card) 33'; Berisha 49' (pen.); Abdullai 71'	Report	Nuñez 34' (pen.); Hestnes 41'; Aleesami (yellow card) 45'; Okeke 56' (penalty missed) 90+1'	Stadium: Aker Stadion; Attendance: 5,544; Referee: Marius Waskaas Lien

5 July 2025 12	Tromsø	1–0	Molde	Tromsø
22:00 CEST (UTC+2)	Guddal (yellow card) 32'; Edvardsson (yellow card) 40'; Braut 80'; Cornic (yellow card) 87'	Report	Sery (yellow card) 14' (yellow-red card) 44'	Stadium: Romssa Arena; Attendance: 6,122; Referee: Rohit Saggi

12 July 2025 13	Fredrikstad	4–2	Molde	Fredrikstad
18:00 CEST (UTC+2)	Owusu (yellow card) 9'; Haugan 81' (o.g.); Øhlenschlæger 85', 88'; Daga 90+9' (o.g.)	Report	Hestad 4'; Kaasa (yellow card) 44'; Rafn 65' (o.g.); Kabini (yellow card) 85'; Haugan (yellow card) 90'	Stadium: Fredrikstad Stadion; Attendance: 8,384; Referee: Ola Hobber Nilsen

19 July 2025 14	Molde	4–1	Strømsgodset	Molde
16:00 CEST (UTC+2)	Sery 11'; Gulbrandsen 20'; Kaasa 41', 51'; Kabini (yellow card) 86'; Breivik (yellow card) 89'	Report	Wikheim 37'	Stadium: Aker Stadion; Attendance: 7,266; Referee: Svein Tore Sinnes

3 August 2025 16	Molde	2–0	Bryne	Molde
17:00 CEST (UTC+2)	Granaas (yellow card) 23'; Gulbrandsen 60'; Sery 74'; Abdullai (yellow card) 89'	Report		Stadium: Aker Stadion; Attendance: 5,775; Referee: Mathias Støfringshaug

9 August 2025 17	Molde	1–0	HamKam	Molde
16:00 CEST (UTC+2)	Gulbrandsen 22'	Report		Stadium: Aker Stadion; Attendance: 6,084; Referee: Eivind Bodding

17 August 2025 18	KFUM Oslo	0–0	Molde	Oslo
17:00 CEST (UTC+2)	Sandal (yellow card) 40'; M.L.Njie (yellow card) 90'; Hjorth (yellow card) 90+7'	Report	Risa (yellow card) 49'; Abdullai (yellow card) 83'	Stadium: KFUM Arena; Attendance: 2,123; Referee: Sigurd Kringstad

24 August 2025 19	Molde	2–0	Tromsø	Molde
19:15 CEST (UTC+2)	Gulbrandsen 27' (pen.); Karlstrøm (yellow card) 45+3'; Kabini (yellow card) 60'; Stenevik 73' (pen.)	Report	R.Jenssen (yellow card) 31'; Skjærvik (yellow card) 39'	Stadium: Aker Stadion; Attendance: 5,919; Referee: Rohit Saggi

31 August 2025 20	Strømsgodset	3–1	Molde	Drammen
19:15 CEST (UTC+2)	Taaje 2'; Bakke 4'; Ardraa (yellow card) 52'; Farji 69'	Report	Roaldsøy (yellow card) 24'; Breivik (yellow card) 44'; Gulbrandsen (yellow card) 51'; Stenevik (yellow card) 52'; Daga 85'	Stadium: Marienlyst Stadion; Attendance: 4,243; Referee: Daniel Higraff

13 September 2025 21	Molde	1–2	Fredrikstad	Molde
16:00 CEST (UTC+2)	Haugan (yellow card) 35'; Abdullai (yellow card) 45+6'; Kabini (yellow card) 63'; Gulbrandsen 90+2'	Report	Molde 28'; Øhlenschlæger 45+6' (pen.); Børsheim (yellow card) 60'; Eid (yellow card) 90+5'	Stadium: Aker Stadion; Attendance: 5,798; Referee: Daniel Higraff

21 September 2025 22	Viking	1–0	Molde	Stavanger
19:15 CEST (UTC+2)	Askildsen (yellow card) 39'; Kvia-Egeskog 61'	Report	Kabini (yellow card) 57'	Stadium: Viking Stadion; Attendance: 14,567; Referee: Tore Hansen

28 September 2025 23	Molde	4–1	Vålerenga	Molde
19:15 CEST (UTC+2)	Hestad 12'; Eikrem 45+5'; Abdullai 52'; Stenevik 87' (pen.); Kasanwirjo (yellow card) 88'	Report	Ambina 36'; Tshiembe (yellow card) 88'	Stadium: Aker Stadion; Attendance: 5,763; Referee: Marius Lien

4 October 2025 24	Kristiansund	2–1	Molde	Kristiansund
18:00 CEST (UTC+2)	Isah 49'; Olsen (yellow card) 60'; Tufekcic (yellow card) 77'	Report	Eikrem 21'; Kabini (yellow card) 54'; Kasanwirjo (yellow card) 86'	Stadium: Kristiansund Stadion; Attendance: 4,003; Referee: Rohit Saggi

19 October 2025 25	Molde	1–3	Sandefjord	Molde
17:00 CEST (UTC+2)	Abdullai 27' (yellow card) 30'; Kasanwirjo (yellow card) 90+5'	Report	Pettersen 5'; Sigurðarson (yellow card) 41' (goal) 43'; Dunsby 48' (yellow card) 73'; Patoulidis (yellow card) 88'	Stadium: Aker Stadion; Attendance: 5,057; Referee: Kristoffer Hagenes

26 October 2025 26	Bodø/Glimt	4–1	Molde	Bodø
17:00 CET (UTC+1)	Berg 15'; Fet 38' (pen.); Aleesami (yellow card) 49'; Evjen 65'; Helmersen 83'	Report	Spiten-Nysæter 44'; Eriksen (yellow card) 67'; Haugan (yellow card) 89'	Stadium: Aspmyra Stadion; Attendance: 6,385; Referee: Ola Hobber Nilsen

1 November 2025 27	Molde	4–2	Rosenborg	Molde
18:00 CET (UTC+1)	Hestad 11'; Breivik 24' (yellow card) 90+6'; Spiten-Nysæter 33'; Kabini (yellow card) 50'; Risa (yellow card) 90+1'; Roaldsøy 90+3'	Report	Islamović 16' (yellow card) 90+1'; Reitan-Sunde (yellow card) 47'; Volden (yellow card) 63'; Haugan 77' (o.g.)	Stadium: Aker Stadion; Attendance: 8,215; Referee: Tore Hansen

9 November 2025 28	Haugesund	0–2	Molde	Haugesund
19:15 CET (UTC+1)		Report	Bjørnbak 52' (o.g.); Spiten-Nysæter (yellow card) 84'; Eikrem (yellow card) 90+1'; Sery 90+2'	Stadium: Haugesund Stadion; Attendance: 2,809; Referee: Eivind Bodding

22 November 2025 29	Molde	4–0	Brann	Molde
18:00 CET (UTC+1)	Risa (yellow card) 26'; Kasanwirjo (yellow card) 45'; Breivik 54'; Christensen (yellow card) 60'; Spiten-Nysæter (yellow card) 61' (goal) 65'; Kabini 75'; Granaas 90+3'	Report		Stadium: Aker Stadion; Attendance: 5,820; Referee: Svein Tore Sinnes

30 November 2025 30	Sarpsborg 08	1–0	Molde	Sarpsborg
17:00 CET (UTC+1)	Carstensen 13'	Report	Breivik (yellow card) 90+6'	Stadium: Sarpsborg Stadion; Attendance: 5,339; Referee: Rohit Saggi

==== Table ====
Pos	Team	Pld	W	D	L	GF	GA	GD	Pts
8	Fredrikstad	30	11	9	10	38	35	+3	42
9	Sarpsborg 08	30	11	8	11	48	50	−2	41
10	Molde	30	12	3	15	46	42	+4	39
11	HamKam	30	10	7	13	42	47	−5	37
12	KFUM Oslo	30	8	11	11	42	41	+1	35

Source: Football Association of Norway (in Norwegian)
Rules for classification: 1) Points; 2) Goal difference; 3) Goals scored; 4) Head-to-head points; 5) Head-to-head goal difference; 6) Head-to-head goals scored.

=== Norwegian Cup ===
==== 2025 ====
13 April 2025 First round	Elnesvågen	0–7	Molde	Elnesvågen
17:00 CEST (UTC+2)	Bergseth (yellow card) 31'	Report	Abdullai 5', 9'; Granaas 21' (yellow card) 65'; Daga 22'; Haugen 51'; Berisha 66', 90+1'	Stadium: Elnesvågen Stadion; Attendance: 1,293; Referee: Bendik Haarberg

24 April 2025 Second round	Træff	1–1 (a.e.t.) (11–12 p)	Molde	Molde
18:00 CEST (UTC+2)	Okanovic (yellow card) 73'; Amdam (yellow card) 85'; Lewis 90+8'; Toven (yellow card) 108'	Report	Hestad (yellow card) 57'; Granaas 82'; Amundsen (yellow card) 91'	Stadium: Reknesbanen; Referee: Mathias Kringstad
	Penalties
	Lewis (penalty scored); Kjørsvik (penalty scored); Heggstad (penalty scored); Amdam (penalty scored); Forren (penalty scored); Myklebust (penalty scored); Ohr (penalty scored); Gravdehaug (penalty scored); Bøe (penalty scored); Baskett (penalty scored); Flønes (penalty scored); Lewis (penalty missed)		(penalty scored) Stenevik; (penalty scored) Enggård; (penalty scored) Linnes; (penalty scored) Eikrem; (penalty scored) Haugen; (penalty scored) Breivik; (penalty scored) Haugan; (penalty scored) Karlstrøm; (penalty scored) Dæhli; (penalty scored) Amundsen; (penalty scored) Granaas; (penalty scored) Stenevik

7 May 2025 Third round	Rana	0–4	Molde	Mo i Rana
18:00 CEST (UTC+2)	Andersen (yellow card) 33'; Aas (yellow card) 39'	Report	Hestad 25'; Abdullai 47', 53'; Eikrem 87'	Stadium: Sagbakken Stadion; Attendance: 2,111; Referee: Mathias Støfringshaug

21 May 2025 Fourth round	Molde	3–4 (a.e.t.)	Kristiansund	Molde
19:00 CEST (UTC+2)	Eikrem (yellow card) 6' (goal) 19'; Berisha 32'; Amundsen (yellow card) 45'; Hestad (yellow card) 89'; Stenevik (yellow card) 100'; Kabini 120+3'	Report	Alte (yellow card) 55'; Kilen 70', 90+1', 93'; Ndour (yellow card) 82' (goal) 116'; Sæther (yellow card) 111'	Stadium: Aker Stadion; Attendance: 2,216; Referee: Daniel Higraff

==== 2025–26 ====
24 September 2025 Third round	Strømsgodset	1–1 (a.e.t.) (3–5 p)	Molde	Drammen
18:00 CEST (UTC+2)	Ampofo (yellow card) 45+1'; Wikheim 55'; Conteh (yellow card) 58'; Enersen (yellow card) 120'	Report	Breivik (yellow card) 25'; Abdullai 36' (yellow card) 64'; Daga (yellow card) 40'; Gulbrandsen (yellow card) 90'; Kasanwirjo (yellow card) 101'	Stadium: Marienlyst Stadion; Attendance: 1,312; Referee: Kristoffer Hagenes
	Penalties
	Stengel (penalty scored); Vilsvik (penalty scored); Valsvik (penalty missed); Farji (penalty scored)		(penalty scored) Gulbrandsen; (penalty scored) Eikrem; (penalty scored) Hestad; (penalty scored) Roaldsøy; (penalty scored) Breivik

See 2026 Season for the Fourth round match against Bodø/Glimt

== Squad statistics ==
As of match played 30 November 2025

=== Appearances and goals ===
No.	Pos	Nat	Player	Total		Eliteserien		2025 Norwegian Cup		2025–26 Norwegian Cup		UEFA Conference League	
No.	Pos	Nat	Player	Apps	Goals	Apps	Goals	Apps	Goals	Apps	Goals	Apps	Goals
1	GK	(Norway) NOR	Jacob Karlstrøm	36	0	28	0	3	0	1	0	4	0
3	DF	(Norway) NOR	Casper Øyvann	11	0	7+4	0	0	0	0	0	0	0
5	MF	(Norway) NOR	Eirik Hestad	32	5	20+4	3	3	1	0+1	0	1+3	1
6	DF	(Norway) NOR	Isak Amundsen	23	0	9+7	0	3	0	0+1	0	3	0
7	MF	(Norway) NOR	Magnus Eikrem	35	6	18+9	3	3+1	2	0+1	0	3	1
8	FW	(Norway) NOR	Fredrik Gulbrandsen	30	8	16+8	7	0+1	0	0+1	0	4	1
9	FW	(Ghana) GHA	Jalal Abdullai	24	9	8+12	4	2+1	4	1	1	0	0
11	MF	(Ivory Coast) CIV	Caleb Zady Sery	19	3	10+8	3	0	0	1	0	0	0
14	MF	(Denmark) DEN	Jacob Steen Christensen	6	0	5+1	0	0	0	0	0	0	0
16	MF	(Norway) NOR	Emil Breivik	36	4	28	4	2+1	0	1	0	4	0
17	MF	(Norway) NOR	Mats Dæhli	31	0	21+2	0	4	0	0	0	4	0
18	MF	(Norway) NOR	Halldor Stenevik	33	2	11+13	2	3+1	0	1	0	4	0
19	DF	(Norway) NOR	Eirik Haugan	35	0	26+1	0	2+2	0	1	0	2+1	0
20	MF	(Norway) NOR	Kristian Eriksen	20	4	10+4	3	2	0	0	0	4	1
21	DF	(Norway) NOR	Martin Linnes	27	0	16+3	0	1+2	0	0+1	0	3+1	0
23	MF	(Norway) NOR	Sondre Granaas	25	3	9+12	1	3+1	2	0	0	0	0
24	DF	(Netherlands) NED	Neraysho Kasanwirjo	8	0	4+3	0	0	0	1	0	0	0
25	FW	(Norway) NOR	Oskar Spiten-Nysæter	14	3	10+3	3	0	0	0+1	0	0	0
26	DF	(South Africa) RSA	Samukele Kabini	23	2	16+2	1	2+2	1	1	0	0	0
27	MF	(Nigeria) NGR	Daniel Daga	17	3	1+11	2	2	1	1	0	0+2	0
28	MF	(Norway) NOR	Alwande Roaldsøy	9	1	3+5	1	0	0	1	0	0	0
29	FW	(Norway) NOR	Gustav Nyheim	5	0	1+3	0	0	0	0	0	0+1	0
33	DF	(Norway) NOR	Birk Risa	16	0	15	0	0	0	1	0	0	0
34	GK	(Republic of Ireland) IRL	Sean McDermott	3	0	2	0	1	0	0	0	0	0
46	FW	(Norway) NOR	Mathias Mork	3	0	0+1	0	0+2	0	0	0	0	0
53	MF	(Norway) NOR	Igor Gosik	1	0	0+1	0	0	0	0	0	0	0
56	FW	(Norway) NOR	Faveur Ndayizeye	1	0	0+1	0	0	0	0	0	0	0
Players away from Molde on loan:
4	DF	(Denmark) DEN	Valdemar Lund	18	0	7+5	0	2+1	0	0	0	3	0
10	MF	(Denmark) DEN	Mads Enggård	17	0	7+2	0	2+2	0	0	0	2+2	0
Players who appeared for Molde no longer at the club:
2	DF	(Norway) NOR	Martin Bjørnbak	10	0	1+3	0	1+2	0	0	0	0+3	0
9	FW	(Denmark) DEN	Frederik Ihler	3	0	0	0	0	0	0	0	0+3	0
14	FW	(Norway) NOR	Veton Berisha	12	7	4+5	4	1+2	3	0	0	0	0
15	MF	(Norway) NOR	Markus Kaasa	14	2	7+5	2	0	0	0	0	2	0
24	MF	(Norway) NOR	Johan Bakke	2	0	0+2	0	0	0	0	0	0	0
28	DF	(Norway) NOR	Kristoffer Haugen	16	1	10+1	0	2+1	1	0	0	1+1	0

=== Goal scorers ===
Rank	Pos.	No.	Nat.	Player	Eliteserien	2025 Norwegian Cup	2025–26 Norwegian Cup	UEFA Conference League	Total
1	FW	9	(Ghana)	Jalal Abdullai	4	4	1	0	9
2	FW	8	(Norway)	Fredrik Gulbrandsen	7	0	0	1	8
3	FW	14	(Norway)	Veton Berisha	4	3	0	0	7
4	MF	7	(Norway)	Magnus Eikrem	3	2	0	1	6
5	MF	5	(Norway)	Eirik Hestad	3	1	0	1	5
6	MF	16	(Norway)	Emil Breivik	4	0	0	0	4
6	MF	20	(Norway)	Kristian Eriksen	3	0	0	1	4
8	MF	11	(Ivory Coast)	Caleb Zady Sery	3	0	0	0	3
8	FW	25	(Norway)	Oskar Spiten-Nysæter	3	0	0	0	3
8	MF	27	(Nigeria)	Daniel Daga	2	1	0	0	3
8	MF	23	(Norway)	Sondre Granaas	1	2	0	0	3
8				Own goal	3	0	0	0	3
13	MF	15	(Norway)	Markus Kaasa	2	0	0	0	2
13	MF	18	(Norway)	Halldor Stenevik	2	0	0	0	2
13	DF	26	(South Africa)	Samukele Kabini	1	1	0	0	2
16	MF	28	(Norway)	Alwande Roaldsøy	1	0	0	0	1
16	DF	28	(Norway)	Kristoffer Haugen	0	1	0	0	1
TOTALS					46	15	1	4	66

=== Clean sheets ===
Rank	Pos.	No.	Nat.	Player	Eliteserien	2025 Norwegian Cup	2025–26 Norwegian Cup	UEFA Conference League	Total
1	GK	1	(Norway)	Jacob Karlstrøm	9	1	0	1	11
2	GK	34	(Republic of Ireland)	Sean McDermott	0	1	0	0	1
TOTALS					9	2	0	1	12

=== Disciplinary record ===
No.	Pos.	Nat.	Name	Eliteserien		2025 Norwegian Cup		2025–26 Norwegian Cup		UEFA Conference League		Total	
No.	Pos.	Nat.	Name	Yellow card	Red card	Yellow card	Red card	Yellow card	Red card	Yellow card	Red card	Yellow card	Red card
1	GK	(Norway)	Jacob Karlstrøm	3	0	0	0	0	0	1	0	4	0
5	MF	(Norway)	Eirik Hestad	1	0	2	0	0	0	0	0	3	0
6	DF	(Norway)	Isak Amundsen	0	0	2	0	0	0	2	1	4	1
7	MF	(Norway)	Magnus Eikrem	1	0	1	0	0	0	1	0	3	0
8	FW	(Norway)	Fredrik Gulbrandsen	3	0	0	0	1	0	0	0	4	0
9	FW	(Ghana)	Jalal Abdullai	6	0	0	0	1	0	0	0	7	0
11	MF	(Ivory Coast)	Caleb Zady Sery	2	1	0	0	0	0	0	0	2	1
14	MF	(Denmark)	Jacob Steen Christensen	1	0	0	0	0	0	0	0	1	0
16	MF	(Norway)	Emil Breivik	8	0	0	0	1	0	1	0	10	0
18	MF	(Norway)	Halldor Stenevik	5	0	1	0	0	0	2	0	8	0
19	DF	(Norway)	Eirik Haugan	5	0	0	0	0	0	2	0	7	0
20	MF	(Norway)	Kristian Eriksen	2	0	0	0	0	0	2	1	4	1
21	DF	(Norway)	Martin Linnes	2	0	0	0	0	0	0	0	2	0
23	MF	(Norway)	Sondre Granaas	3	0	1	0	0	0	0	0	4	0
24	DF	(Netherlands)	Neraysho Kasanwirjo	4	0	0	0	1	0	0	0	5	0
25	FW	(Norway)	Oskar Spiten-Nysæter	2	0	0	0	0	0	0	0	2	0
26	DF	(South Africa)	Samukele Kabini	8	0	0	0	0	0	0	0	8	0
27	MF	(Nigeria)	Daniel Daga	2	0	0	0	1	0	0	0	3	0
28	MF	(Norway)	Alwande Roaldsøy	1	0	0	0	0	0	0	0	1	0
33	DF	(Norway)	Birk Risa	3	0	0	0	0	0	0	0	3	0
Players away from Molde on loan:
4	DF	(Denmark)	Valdemar Lund	1	0	0	0	0	0	1	1	2	1
10	MF	(Denmark)	Mads Enggård	5	1	0	0	0	0	0	0	5	1
Players who appeared for Molde no longer at the club:
14	FW	(Norway)	Veton Berisha	0	1	0	0	0	0	0	0	0	1
15	MF	(Norway)	Markus Kaasa	1	0	0	0	0	0	0	0	1	0
TOTALS				70	3	3	0	5	0	12	3	90	6

== See also ==
- Molde FK seasons
