= 2024 Molde FK season =

Molde
2024 season
- Chairman: Odd Ivar Moen
- Manager: Erling Moe (Until 8 December); Trond Strande & Eirik Mæland (Interim) (From 8 December)
- Stadium: Aker Stadion
- Eliteserien: 5th
- Norwegian Cup: Runnersup
- 2023–24 UEFA Europa Conference League: Round of 16
- 2024–25 UEFA Europa League: Playoff round
- 2024–25 UEFA Europa Conference League: Advanced to Knockout phase play-offs
- Top goalscorer: League: Magnus Wolff Eikrem (14); All: Magnus Wolff Eikrem (20)
- Highest home attendance: 10,746 vs Rosenborg (11 May 2024)
- Lowest home attendance: 2,083 vs Sarpsborg 08 (8 May 2024)
- Average home league attendance: 7,175 (23 November 2024)
Home colours	Away colours	Third colours

The 2024 season was Molde's 17th consecutive year in Eliteserien, and their 48th season in the top flight of Norwegian football.

== Season events ==
On 27 December, AIK announced they'd exercised an agreement in their loan deal to make Benjamin Hansen's move a permanent one from 1 January.

On 1 January, Harun Ibrahim joined GAIS on a season-long loan deal.

On 4 January, Molde announced the signing of Sondre Milian Granaas from Mjøndalen, to a three-year contract.

On 8 January, Molde announced the singing of Halldor Stenevik to a four-year contract from Strømsgodset, and the return of Mats Møller Dæhli also on a four-year contract from 1. FC Nürnberg.

On 11 January, Molde announced the signing of Alwande Roaldsøy from Atalanta, to a three-year contract.

On 16 January, Magnus Grødem left the club to sign for Swiss Super League club Yverdon-Sport.

On 23 January, Andreas Myklebust and Gustav Nyheim signed new contracts, keeping them at Molde until the end of 2025.

On 1 February, Molde announced the signing of Albert Posiadała from Radomiak Radom, to a four-year contract, and the signing of Valdemar Lund from Copenhagen to a four-year contract.

On 6 February, Andreas Myklebust joined 2. divisjon club Kvik Halden on loan for the season.

On 21 February, Peder Hoel Lervik joined 2. divisjon club Eidsvold on loan for the season.

On 26 February, Molde announced the signing of Isak Amundsen to a four-year contract from Bodø/Glimt.

On 27 February, Eric Kitolano was sold to fellow Eliteserien club Lillestrøm.

On 20 March, Niklas Ødegård joined HamKam on loan for the season.

On 27 March, Molde announced the signing of free-agent Aaron Samuel on a contract until the end of the season.

On 30 May, free-agent Sean McDermott signed on a contract until the end of the season.

On 14 June, Filip Kristoffersen joined Raufoss on a short term loan.

On 2 August, Jacob Karlstrøm joined IFK Göteborg on a loan for the rest of the season.

On 5 August, Molde announced the signing of Frederik Ihler from Landskrona BoIS on a contract until 2028.

On 10 August, Filip Kristoffersen went on his second loan for the season, this time to Grorud.

On 18 August, Molde announced that Niklas Ødegård had returned early from his loan to HamKam, whilst the following day, 19 August, Peder Hoel Lervik also returned to Molde early after his loan deal with Eidsvold was ended.

On 19 August, Molde announced the signing of Mads Enggård from Randers on a contract until August 2028.

On 29 August, Molde announced that they had extended their contract with Leon-Robin Juberg-Hovland until the end of the 2025 season, and that he had joined IL Hødd on loan for the remainder of the season.

On 1 September, Molde announced the return of Ola Brynhildsen on loan from Midtjylland for the remainder of the season.

On 2 September, Molde announced that Oliver Petersen had joined Lillestrøm on loan for the remainder of the season.

On 8 December, Molde announced that Erling Moe had left his role of Head Coach after the club failed to qualify for European competitions, with Trond Strande and Eirik Mæland being announced as Interim Head Coaches for the remaining two UEFA Conference League matches of the year.

== Squad ==
As of match played 19 December 2024

No.	Name	Nationality	Position	Date of birth (age)	Signed from	Signed in	Contract ends	Apps.	Goals
Goalkeepers
22	Albert Posiadała	(Poland)	GK	25 February 2003 (aged 21)	Radomiak Radom	2024	2027	37	0
32	Peder Hoel Lervik	(Norway)	GK	24 April 2005 (aged 19)	Academy	2021		0	0
34	Sean McDermott	(Republic of Ireland)	GK	30 May 1993 (aged 31)	Unattached	2024	2026	3	0
Defenders
2	Martin Bjørnbak	(Norway)	DF	22 March 1992 (aged 32)	Bodø/Glimt	2019	2025	156	6
3	Casper Øyvann	(Norway)	DF	7 December 1999 (aged 25)	Tromsø	2023	2026	54	0
4	Valdemar Lund	(Denmark)	DF	28 May 2003 (aged 21)	Copenhagen	2024	2027	32	0
19	Eirik Haugan	(Norway)	DF	27 August 1997 (aged 27)	Östersunds	2022	2026	119	6
21	Martin Linnes	(Norway)	DF	20 September 1991 (aged 33)	Unattached	2021	2025	263	29
25	Anders Hagelskjær	(Denmark)	DF	16 February 1997 (aged 27)	AaB	2023	2026	73	2
26	Isak Amundsen	(Norway)	DF	14 October 1999 (aged 25)	Bodø/Glimt	2024	2027	39	0
28	Kristoffer Haugen	(Norway)	DF	21 February 1994 (aged 30)	Viking	2018	2025	211	23
31	Mathias Løvik	(Norway)	DF	6 December 2003 (aged 21)	Academy	2021	2027	108	7
Midfielders
5	Eirik Hestad	(Norway)	MF	26 June 1995 (aged 29)	Unattached	2023	2027	279	44
7	Magnus Wolff Eikrem	(Norway)	MF	8 August 1990 (aged 34)	Seattle Sounders FC	2018	2025	318	81
10	Mads Enggård	(Denmark)	MF	20 January 2004 (aged 20)	Randers	2025	2028	22	0
15	Markus Kaasa	(Norway)	MF	15 July 1997 (aged 27)	Odd	2022	2025	109	17
16	Emil Breivik	(Norway)	MF	11 June 2000 (aged 24)	Academy	2014	2027	170	19
17	Mats Møller Dæhli	(Norway)	MF	2 March 1995 (aged 29)	1. FC Nürnberg	2024	2027	55	1
18	Halldor Stenevik	(Norway)	MF	2 February 2000 (aged 24)	Strømsgodset	2024	2027	46	5
20	Kristian Eriksen	(Norway)	MF	18 July 1995 (aged 29)	HamKam	2022	2026	120	32
23	Sondre Granaas	(Norway)	MF	30 August 2006 (aged 18)	Mjøndalen	2024	2026	19	3
24	Johan Bakke	(Norway)	MF	1 April 2004 (aged 20)	Sogndal	2022	2026	20	0
33	Niklas Ødegård	(Norway)	MF	29 March 2004 (aged 20)	Academy	2021	2025	49	6
Forwards
8	Fredrik Gulbrandsen	(Norway)	FW	10 September 1992 (aged 32)	Unattached	2023		86	35
9	Frederik Ihler	(Denmark)	FW	25 June 2003 (aged 21)	Landskrona BoIS	2024	2028	23	7
11	Aaron Samuel	(Nigeria)	FW	4 June 1994 (aged 30)	Unattached	2024	2024	18	5
14	Veton Berisha	(Norway)	FW	13 April 1994 (aged 30)	Hammarby	2023	2026	46	8
27	Ola Brynhildsen	(Norway)	FW	27 April 1999 (aged 25)	on loan from Midtjylland	2024	2024	155	54
29	Gustav Nyheim	(Norway)	FW	13 February 2006 (aged 18)	Academy	2021	2025	17	1
Molde II
35	William Fraser	(Norway)	GK	26 January 2002 (aged 22)	Academy	2021		0	0
38	Magnus Solheim	(Norway)	FW	3 March 2005 (aged 19)	Academy	2022		0	0
40	Martin Kjørsvik	(Norway)	FW	17 January 2003 (aged 21)	Academy	2021		1	0
41	Sindre Heggstad	(Norway)	DF	6 April 2003 (aged 21)	Academy	2021		0	0
42	Jesper Myklebust	(Norway)	FW	5 June 2003 (aged 21)	Academy	2022		0	0
51	Mads Myklebust	(Norway)	GK	31 July 2007 (aged 17)	Academy	2024		0	0
52	Fredrik Nyheim	(Norway)	DF	2 April 2005 (aged 19)	Academy	2021		0	0
53	Adrian Viken	(Norway)	DF	14 July 2005 (aged 19)	Academy	2021		0	0
55	Emil Silseth	(Norway)	MF	15 September 2005 (aged 19)	Academy	2022		0	0
	Vegard Myklebust	(Norway)	MF	2 February 2005 (aged 19)	Academy	2022		0	0
Out on loan
1	Jacob Karlstrøm	(Norway)	GK	9 January 1997 (aged 27)	Tromsø	2022	2025	86	0
6	Alwande Roaldsøy	(Norway)	MF	9 June 2004 (aged 20)	Atalanta	2024	2026	10	0
12	Oliver Petersen	(Norway)	GK	26 September 2001 (aged 23)	Follo	2019	2026	36	0
30	Leon-Robin Juberg-Hovland	(Norway)	MF	9 May 2004 (aged 20)	Academy	2021	2025	4	1
32	Harun Ibrahim	(Sweden)	MF	26 February 2003 (aged 21)	GAIS	2023	2026	0	0
36	Filip Kristoffersen	(Norway)	DF	9 March 2004 (aged 20)	Academy	2021	2025	0	0
46	Andreas Myklebust	(Norway)	MF	16 July 2005 (aged 19)	Academy	2021	2025	4	0
Players who left club during season
10	Eric Kitolano	(Norway)	MF	2 September 1997 (aged 27)	Tromsø	2023	2025	41	7
48	Anton Solbakken	(Norway)	MF	26 June 2004 (aged 20)	Academy	2022	2024	0	0
49	Nikolai Ohr	(Norway)	MF	22 November 2004 (aged 20)	Academy	2022	2024	0	0
59	Albert Tjåland	(Norway)	FW	11 February 2004 (aged 20)	Bryne	2020	2024	1	1

== Transfers ==
=== In ===
Date	Position	Nationality	Name	From	Fee	Ref.
4 January 2024	MF	(Norway)	Sondre Milian Granaas	Mjøndalen	Undisclosed	
8 January 2024	MF	(Norway)	Mats Møller Dæhli	1. FC Nürnberg	Undisclosed	
8 January 2024	MF	(Norway)	Halldor Stenevik	Strømsgodset	Undisclosed	
11 January 2024	MF	(Norway)	Alwande Roaldsøy	Atalanta	Undisclosed	
1 February 2024	GK	(Poland)	Albert Posiadała	Radomiak Radom	Undisclosed	
1 February 2024	DF	(Denmark)	Valdemar Lund	Copenhagen	Undisclosed	
26 February 2024	DF	(Norway)	Isak Amundsen	Bodø/Glimt	Undisclosed	
27 March 2024	FW	(Nigeria)	Aaron Samuel	Unattached	Free	
30 May 2024	GK	(Republic of Ireland)	Sean McDermott	Unattached	Free	
5 August 2024	FW	(Denmark)	Frederik Ihler	Landskrona BoIS	Undisclosed	
19 August 2024	MF	(Denmark)	Mads Enggård	Randers	Undisclosed	

=== Loans in ===
Date from	Position	Nationality	Name	From	Date to	Ref.
1 September 2024	FW	(Norway)	Ola Brynhildsen	Midtjylland	End of the season	

=== Out ===
Date	Position	Nationality	Name	To	Fee	Ref.
1 January 2024	DF	(Denmark)	Benjamin Hansen	AIK	Undisclosed	
16 January 2024	MF	(Norway)	Magnus Grødem	Yverdon-Sport	Undisclosed	
27 February 2024	MF	(Norway)	Eric Kitolano	Lillestrøm	Undisclosed	
10 September 2024	MF	(Norway)	Anton Solbakken	Lokomotiv Oslo	Undisclosed	

=== Loans out ===
Date from	Position	Nationality	Name	To	Date to	Ref.
1 January 2024	MF	(Sweden)	Harun Ibrahim	GAIS	End of season	
6 February 2024	MF	(Norway)	Andreas Myklebust	Kvik Halden	End of season	
21 February 2024	GK	(Norway)	Peder Hoel Lervik	Eidsvold Turn	19 August 2024	
20 March 2024	MF	(Norway)	Niklas Ødegård	HamKam	18 August 2024	
14 June 2024	DF	(Norway)	Filip Kristoffersen	Raufoss	28 June 2024	
2 August 2024	GK	(Norway)	Jacob Karlstrøm	IFK Göteborg	End of season	
10 August 2024	DF	(Norway)	Filip Kristoffersen	Grorud	End of season	
29 August 2024	MF	(Norway)	Leon-Robin Juberg-Hovland	IL Hødd	End of season	
29 August 2024	MF	(Norway)	Alwande Roaldsøy	Sandnes Ulf	End of season	
2 September 2024	GK	(Norway)	Oliver Petersen	Lillestrøm	End of season	

=== Released ===
Date	Position	Nationality	Name	Joined	Date	Ref.
30 June 2024	MF	(Norway)	Nikolai Ohr	Træff	16 July 2024	
30 June 2024	FW	(Norway)	Albert Tjåland	Junkeren	28 July 2024	
31 December 2024	FW	(Nigeria)	Aaron Samuel			

== Friendlies ==
28 January 2024	Molde	3–1	Kristiansund	Molde
14:00 CET (UTC+1)	Gulbrandsen 25'; (yellow card) 44'; Eriksen 55'; Nyheim 61'	Report	Aalberg 72'	Stadium: Aker Stadion; Attendance: 11,249

2 February 2024 The Atlantic Cup	Molde	2–1	Midtjylland	Albufeira, Portugal
15:30 CET (UTC+1)	Gulbrandsen 2'; Haugan (yellow card) 22'; (yellow card) 57'; Berisha 83'	Report	M.B.Sørensen 70'	Stadium: Estádio da Nora

4 February 2024	Molde	v	KÍ Klaksvik	Albufeira, Portugal
15:00 CET (UTC+1)				Stadium: Estádio da Nora

8 February 2024 The Atlantic Cup	Copenhagen	2–1	Molde	São João da Venda, Portugal
14:00 CET (UTC+1)	Elyounoussi 3', 35'; Larsson 47'	Report	Bjørnbak (yellow card) 37'; Haugan 52'	Stadium: Estádio Algarve

2 March 2024	Molde	1–1	Kristiansund	Molde
16:30 CET (UTC+1)	Ødegård 72'; (yellow card) 85'	Report	Nelson 53'; (yellow card) 69'	Stadium: Aker Stadion

19 March 2024	Molde	1–0	Brann	Molde
14:30 CET (UTC+1)	(yellow card) 16'; Gulbrandsen 29'; (yellow card) 32'	Report	(yellow card) 60'	Stadium: Aker Stadion

23 March 2024	Bodø/Glimt	3–5	Molde	Bodø
13:00 CET (UTC+1)	Hauge 34'; Hauge 52' (pen.); Bjørtuft 73'	Report	Eriksen 42'; Stenevik 45'; Gulbrandsen 53'; Eriksen 61'; Saltnes 64' (o.g.)	Stadium: Aspmyra Stadion

21 June 2024	Molde	2–0	Odd	Molde
13:00 CET (UTC+1)	Løvik 22'; Eriksen 34'	Report	Miettinen (yellow card) 87'	Stadium: Aker Stadion

== Competitions ==
=== Overview ===
Competition	First match	Last match	Starting round	Final position	Record							
Competition	First match	Last match	Starting round	Final position	Pld	W	D	L	GF	GA	GD	Win %
Eliteserien	1 April 2024	1 December 2024	Matchday 1	5th	30	15	7	8	64	36	+28	50.00
Norwegian Cup	10 April 2024	7 December 2024	First round	Runnerup	7	6	0	1	18	6	+12	85.71
2023–24 UEFA Europa Conference League	15 February 2024	14 March 2024	Knockout round play-offs	Round of 16	4	3	0	1	8	6	+2	75.00
2024–25 UEFA Europa League	25 July 2024	29 August 2024	Second qualifying round	Play off round	6	3	0	3	9	6	+3	50.00
2024–25 UEFA Conference League	3 October 2024	19 December 2024	League phase	2025 season	6	2	1	3	10	11	−1	33.33
Total					53	29	8	16	109	65	+44	54.72

Last updated: 19 December 2024
Source: Competitions

=== UEFA Europa Conference League ===
==== Knockout phase ====
15 February 2024 Knockout round play-offs 1st leg	Molde (Norway)	3–2	(Poland) Legia Warsaw	Molde, Norway
18:45 CET (UTC+1)	Gulbrandsen 12', 19'; Kaasa 24'; Eriksen (yellow card) 58'; Hagelskjær (yellow card) 70'; Hestad (yellow card) 82'; Linnes (yellow card) 90'; Ødegård (yellow card) 90+2'	Report	Josué 63' (yellow card) 90+3'; Augustyniak 71'; Elitim (yellow card) 85'	Stadium: Aker Stadion; Attendance: 3,996; Referee: Enea Jorgji (Albania)

21 February 2024 Knockout round play-offs 2nd leg	Legia Warsaw (Poland)	0–3 (2–6 agg.)	(Norway) Molde	Warsaw, Poland
21:00 CET (UTC+1)	Elitim (yellow card) 26'; Augustyniak (yellow card) 56'	Report	Gulbrandsen 2', 67' (yellow card) 47'; Hestad 20'; Kaasa (yellow card) 28'; Haugan (yellow card) 71'; Løvik (yellow card) 74'	Stadium: Stadion Wojska Polskiego; Attendance: 27,459; Referee: Harm Osmers (Germany)

7 March 2024 Round of 16 1st leg	Molde (Norway)	2–1	(Belgium) Club Brugge	Molde, Norway
18:45 CET (UTC+1)	Stenevik 43'; Hagelskjær (yellow card) 79'; Gulbrandsen 90+2'	Report	De Cuyper 85' (pen.)	Stadium: Aker Stadion; Attendance: 9,267; Referee: Filip Glova (Slovakia)

14 March 2024 Round of 16 2nd leg	Club Brugge (Belgium)	3–0 (4–2 agg.)	(Norway) Molde	Bruges, Belgium
21:00 CET (UTC+1)	Skov Olsen 45+1', 48'; Skóraś 70'; De Cuyper (yellow card) 88'	Report	Gulbrandsen (yellow card) 88'	Stadium: Jan Breydel Stadium; Attendance: 11,858; Referee: Radu Petrescu (Romania)

=== Eliteserien ===
==== Results summary ====
Overall								Home						Away					
Pld	W	D	L	GF	GA	GD	Pts	W	D	L	GF	GA	GD	W	D	L	GF	GA	GD
29	15	7	7	64	35	+29	52	8	3	4	39	23	+16	7	4	3	25	12	+13

Last updated: 23 November 2024.
Source: see below

==== Results by match ====
Match	1	2	3	17^{1}	4	5	6	7	8	9	10	11	12	13	14	15	16	18	20	21	22	19^{2}	23	24	25	26	27	28	29	30
Ground	H	A	H	H	A	H	A	H	A	H	A	H	A	H	A	H	A	A	H	A	H	A	A	H	H	A	H	A	H	A
Result	W	W	W	L	D	W	L	D	W	L	W	D	W	W	D	L	L	W	W	L	W	W	D	W	L	W	D	D	W	L
Position	1	1	2	2	2	2	3	4	3	4	4	4	3	3	3	3	4	4	4	4	3	2	3	3	3	3	4	4	4	5

Updated to match(es) played on 1 December 2024. Source: see below
A = Away; H = Home; W = Win; D = Draw; L = Loss
Notes:
- ^{1} Matchday 17 (vs Odd) was moved forward from 4 August due to Molde's participation in the 2024–25 UEFA Europa League.
- ^{2} Matchday 19 (vs Kristiansund) was moved back from 18 August to 18 September, due Molde's participation in the 2024–25 UEFA Europa League.

==== Results ====
1 April 2024 1	Molde	4–0	Strømsgodset	Molde
17:00 CEST (UTC+2)	Hestad 25'; Kaasa 51'; Amundsen (yellow card) 60'; Hagelskjær (yellow card) 63'; Eriksen 73'; Eikrem 90'	Report	Andersen (yellow card) 50'	Stadium: Aker Stadion; Attendance: 7,203; Referee: Espen Eskås

7 April 2024 2	HamKam	0–1	Molde	Hamar
17:00 CEST (UTC+2)		Report	Linnes (yellow card) 31'; Hagelskjær (yellow card) 36' (goal) 45'	Stadium: Briskeby Stadion; Attendance: 3,822; Referee: Svein Tore Sinnes

14 April 2024 3	Molde	2–0	Kristiansund	Molde
17:00 CEST (UTC+2)	Hestad 27'; Eriksen 56'	Report	Williamsen (yellow card) 23'; Guèye (yellow card) 60'; Willumsson (yellow card) 90+3'	Stadium: Aker Stadion; Attendance: 8,810; Referee: Rohit Saggi

17 April 2024 17	Molde	1–2	Odd	Molde
18:00 CEST (UTC+2)	Eriksen 33' (yellow card) 90+5'	Report	Bang-Kittilsen 35'; Svendsen (yellow card) 58'; Tewelde 70'	Stadium: Aker Stadion; Attendance: 5,753; Referee: Daniel Higraff

21 April 2024 4	Bodø/Glimt	1–1	Molde	Bodø
19:15 CEST (UTC+2)	Žugelj 8'; Berg (yellow card) 37'	Report	Hestad (yellow card) 52'; Haugen 55'; Eriksen (yellow card) 56'; Stenevik (yellow card) 85'; Løvik (yellow card) 88'	Stadium: Aspmyra Stadion; Attendance: 7,127; Referee: Tore Hansen

28 April 2024 5	Molde	2–1	Haugesund	Molde
17:00 CEST (UTC+2)	Eikrem 4'; Eriksen 10' (yellow card) 42'; Gulbrandsen (yellow card) 49'	Report	Diarra 69'; Lúðvíksson (yellow card) 90+2'	Stadium: Aker Stadion; Attendance: 6,160; Referee: Christian Moen

5 May 2024 6	Sandefjord	3–1	Molde	Sandefjord
17:00 CEST (UTC+2)	Amin 65' (yellow card) 80'; Mettler (yellow card) 71'; Kristiansen 78'; Nilsson 90+6'	Report	Gulbrandsen (yellow card) 32' (goal) 35'; Haugen (yellow card) 42'	Stadium: Sandefjord Arena; Attendance: 3,179; Referee: Kristoffer Hagenes

11 May 2024 7	Molde	2–2	Rosenborg	Molde
18:00 CEST (UTC+2)	Breivik (yellow card) 30'; Eikrem 33'; Stenevik 79'; Løvik (yellow card) 85'	Report	Nypan 59'; Sæter 76'; Pereira (yellow card) 80'; Tagseth (yellow card) 81'	Stadium: Aker Stadion; Attendance: 10,746; Referee: Ola Hobber Nilsen

16 May 2024 8	Odd	0–4	Molde	Skien
18:00 CEST (UTC+2)	Miettinen (red card) 31'; Skau (yellow card) 61'; Hussain (yellow card) 62'	Report	Eikrem 17', 33'; Amundsen (yellow card) 51'; Løvik 73'; Samuel 81'	Stadium: Skagerak Arena; Attendance: 6,325; Referee: Tore Hansen

20 May 2024 9	Molde	2–4	Sarpsborg 08	Molde
17:00 CEST (UTC+2)	Gulbrandsen (yellow card) 13'; Stenevik 23'; Eikrem 61'; Kaasa (yellow card) 75'	Report	Chrupałła 10'; Sher (yellow card) 29'; Johansen 34'; Ørjasæter 51', 90+2'; M.Andersen (yellow card) 89'	Stadium: Aker Stadion; Attendance: 6,034; Referee: Marius Lien

26 May 2024 10	Brann	1–3	Molde	Bergen
19:15 CEST (UTC+2)	Knudsen 36'; Castro (yellow card) 68'; Nilsen (yellow card) 90+7'	Report	Amundsen (yellow card) 54'; Eriksen 60'; Eikrem 70'; Hestad 72'; Lund (yellow card) 88'	Stadium: Brann Stadion; Attendance: 16,317; Referee: Espen Eskås

2 June 2024 11	Molde	2–2	Viking	Molde
14:30 CEST (UTC+2)	Gulbrandsen 7'; Eriksen 74'	Report	Amundsen 20' (o.g.); McDermott 46' (o.g.); Yazbek (yellow card) 50'; Tripić (yellow card) 69'; Stensness (yellow card) 76'	Stadium: Aker Stadion; Attendance: 6,879; Referee: Tore Hansen

28 June 2024 12	Tromsø	0–2	Molde	Tromsø
21:15 CEST (UTC+2)		Report	Løvik (yellow card) 16' (goal) 61'; Eriksen 35'; Posiadała (yellow card) 78'	Stadium: Romssa Arena; Attendance: 4,333; Referee: Daniel Higraff

7 July 2024 13	Molde	3–0	Lillestrøm	Molde
17:00 CEST (UTC+2)	Eriksen 13'; Christiansen 24' (o.g.); Amundsen (yellow card) 51'; Løvik 67'; Dæhli (yellow card) 76'	Report	Lucky (yellow card) 64'	Stadium: Aker Stadion; Attendance: 7,050; Referee: Sivert Amland

13 July 2024 14	Fredrikstad	0–0	Molde	Fredrikstad
17:00 CEST (UTC+2)	Traoré (yellow card) 49'	Report	Eriksen (yellow card) 81'; Haugan 84'	Stadium: Fredrikstad Stadion; Attendance: 9,115; Referee: Kristoffer Hagenes

20 July 2024 15	Molde	2–3	KFUM Oslo	Molde
20:15 CEST (UTC+2)	Løvik 20'; Breivik (yellow card) 57'; Eikrem 65'; Dæhli (yellow card) 77'; Haugen (yellow card) 90+8'	Report	Dahl 22'; Aleesami 34'; Nuñez 83'; Nouri (yellow card) 90+8'	Stadium: Aker Stadion; Attendance: 7,564; Referee: Sigurd Kringstad

28 July 2024 16	Viking	1–0	Molde	Stavanger
19:15 CEST (UTC+2)	Tripić (yellow card) 44'; Bjørshol 47' (yellow card) 70'; Langås (yellow card) 77'	Report	Lund (yellow card) 41'	Stadium: Viking Stadion; Attendance: 10,622; Referee: Rohit Saggi

11 August 2024 18	Lillestrøm	1–2	Molde	Lillestrøm
19:15 CEST (UTC+2)	Ibrahimaj 10' (yellow card) 82'; Gabrielsen (yellow card) 45+2'; Garnås (yellow card) 72'; Charles (yellow card) 77'	Report	Ihler 45+1'; Breivik (yellow card) 64'; Eriksen 90+1'	Stadium: Åråsen Stadion; Attendance: 6,403; Referee: Tore Hansen

25 August 2024 20	Molde	3–0	HamKam	Molde
17:00 CEST (UTC+2)	Haugan 22'; Posiadała (yellow card) 32'; Eriksen (yellow card) 61'; Eikrem 68', 73'	Report		Stadium: Aker Stadion; Attendance: 6,433; Referee: Ola Hobber Nilsen

1 September 2024 21	Rosenborg	2–1	Molde	Trondheim
17:00 CEST (UTC+2)	Holm (yellow card) 31'; Pereira 50'; M.Ceïde (yellow card) 81'; Sæter (yellow card) 84'; Tagseth 90+2'	Report	Brynhildsen 5'; Eriksen (yellow card) 8'; Løvik (yellow card) 34'	Stadium: Lerkendal Stadion; Attendance: 21,426; Referee: Tore Hansen

14 September 2024 22	Molde	6–1	Fredrikstad	Molde
18:00 CEST (UTC+2)	Haugen 15'; Bjørnbak 28'; Haugan 32'; Kaasa 52'; Brynhildsen 57'; Linnes 60'	Report	Rafn 1'; Fall (yellow card) 13'	Stadium: Aker Stadion; Attendance: 6,372; Referee: Sivert Amland

18 September 2024 19	Kristiansund	0–4	Molde	Kristiansund
18:00 CEST (UTC+2)	Tufekcic (yellow card) 54'; Lien (yellow card) 78'; Sivertsen (yellow card) 84'; Jeličić (yellow card) 90+2'	Report	Eikrem 7'; Haugan 23'; Brynhildsen 48'; Eriksen 61'; Amundsen (yellow card) 89'	Stadium: Kristiansund Stadion; Attendance: 4,030; Referee: Daniel Higraff
Note: Match originally scheduled for 18 August, but postponed due to Molde's participation in the UEFA Europa League.

23 September 2024 23	KFUM Oslo	1–1	Molde	Oslo
19:00 CEST (UTC+2)	Nouri 79'	Report	Brynhildsen 80'	Stadium: KFUM Arena; Attendance: 2,827; Referee: Marius Lien

28 September 2024 24	Molde	5–3	Tromsø	Molde
14:00 CEST (UTC+2)	Eikrem 6'; Eriksen 24', 90+2'; Stenevik 73' (pen.); Brynhildsen 76'	Report	Cornic 56', 85'; Edvardsson 90+4'	Stadium: Aker Stadion; Attendance: 6,090; Referee: Sigurd Kringstad

19 October 2024 25	Molde	0–1	Sandefjord	Molde
16:00 CEST (UTC+2)		Report	Gjone (yellow card) 41'; Mettler 65'	Stadium: Aker Stadion; Attendance: 6,293; Referee: Mohammad Usman Aslam

27 October 2024 26	Haugesund	0–3	Molde	Haugesund
17:00 CET (UTC+1)	Diarra (yellow card) 45+4'; Liseth (yellow card) 72'; Lúðvíksson (yellow card) 81'; Sauer (yellow card) 90'	Report	Eriksen 1'; Haugan (yellow card) 78' (goal) 90+3'; Ihler 83' (pen.); Brynhildsen (yellow card) 90+1'	Stadium: Haugesund Stadion; Attendance: 3,802; Referee: Sivert Amland

3 November 2024 27	Molde	3–3	Bodø/Glimt	Molde
17:00 CET (UTC+1)	Brynhildsen 16', 28' (penalty missed) 40' (yellow card) 72'; Breivik 71'	Report	Saltnes 37'; Wembangomo (yellow card) 40'; Bjørkan 58'; Øyvann 64' (o.g.)	Stadium: Aker Stadion; Attendance: 6,997; Referee: Ola Hobber Nilsen

10 November 2024 28	Sarpsborg 08	2–2	Molde	Sarpsborg
17:00 CET (UTC+1)	Johansen 8' (pen.); Halvorsen 25'; Berget (yellow card) 45'	Report	Lund (yellow card) 6'; Brynhildsen 16'; Eriksen 22' (yellow card) 84'; Breivik (yellow card) 29'; Amundsen (yellow card) 87'	Stadium: Sarpsborg Stadion; Attendance: 4,274; Referee: Christian Moen

23 November 2024 29	Molde	2–1	Brann	Molde
17:00 CET (UTC+1)	Lund (yellow card) 14'; Brynhildsen 41', 45+1' (yellow card) 48'	Report	Myhre 57'; Soltvedt (yellow card) 71'	Stadium: Aker Stadion; Attendance: 9,248; Referee: Espen Eskås

1 December 2024 30	Strømsgodset	1–0	Molde	Drammen
17:00 CET (UTC+1)	Sørmo (yellow card) 48'; Möller 57'; Kristensen Dahl (yellow card) 90+1'; Silalahi (yellow card) 90+5'	Report		Stadium: Marienlyst Stadion; Attendance: 4,207; Referee: Marius Lien

==== Table ====
Pos	Team	Pld	W	D	L	GF	GA	GD	Pts	Qualification or relegation
3	Viking	30	16	9	5	61	39	+22	57	Qualification for the Conference League second qualifying round
4	Rosenborg	30	16	5	9	52	39	+13	53	Qualification for the Conference League second qualifying round
5	Molde	30	15	7	8	64	36	+28	52	
6	Fredrikstad	30	14	9	7	39	35	+4	51	Qualification for the Europa League third qualifying round (Note: Fredrikstad qualified for the Europa League third qualifying round by winning the 2024 Norwegian Football Cup.)
7	Strømsgodset	30	10	8	12	32	40	−8	38	

Source: Football Association of Norway (in Norwegian)
Rules for classification: 1) Points; 2) Goal difference; 3) Goals scored; 4) Head-to-head points; 5) Head-to-head goal difference; 6) Head-to-head goals scored.

=== Norwegian Cup ===
10 April 2024 First round	Eide/Omegn	0–5	Molde	Hustadvika
18:00 CEST (UTC+2)		Report	Samuel 61'; Nyheim 65'; Granaas 75'; Juberg-Hovland 88'; Breivik 90+2'	Stadium: Eide Kunstgressbane; Attendance: 750; Referee: Mathias Kringstad

24 April 2024 Second round	Strindheim	1–2	Molde	Trondheim
18:00 CEST (UTC+2)	Nytoft 47'; Dønnem (yellow card) 62'	Report	Samuel 38', 53' (pen.); Haugan (yellow card) 59'	Stadium: Strindheim kunstgress Attendance: 679; Referee: Mathias Støfringshaug

1 May 2024 Third round	Hødd	1–3	Molde	Ulsteinvik
16:00 CEST (UTC+2)	Håheim-Elveseter 56'	Report	Samuel 25'; Granaas 62'; Breivik 69' (yellow card) 90'	Stadium: Nye Høddvoll; Attendance: 2,317; Referee: Mohammad Usman Aslam

8 May 2024 Fourth round	Molde	4–2	Sarpsborg 08	Molde
18:00 CEST (UTC+2)	Amundsen (yellow card) 38'; Eriksen 48'; Hagelskjær 74'; Eikrem 78'; Hestad 82'	Report	Reinhardsen 33'; Hiim (yellow card) 40'; Ørjasæter 49'; Ørjasæter (yellow card) 54' (yellow-red card) 65'; Wichne (yellow card) 76'; Zekhnini (yellow card) 87'	Stadium: Aker Stadion; Attendance: 2,083; Referee: Sivert Amland

6 October 2024 Quarterfinal	Lillestrøm	1–2	Molde	Lillestrøm
17:15 CEST (UTC+2)	Røssing-Lelesiit 78'; Roseth (yellow card) 90+4'; Gabrielsen (yellow card) 90+6'	Report	Brynhildsen 29'; Ihler 88'; Løvik (yellow card) 90+5'; Dæhli (yellow card) 90+6'; Ødegård (yellow card) 90+6'; Hagelskjær (yellow card) 90+6'	Stadium: Åråsen Stadion; Attendance: 5,181; Referee: Espen Eskås

30 October 2024 Semifinal	Sandnes Ulf	0–2	Molde	Sandnes
18:00 CET (UTC+1)	Øregaard (yellow card) 67'; Alba (yellow card) 74'	Report	Eriksen 40'; Haugen 78'	Stadium: Øster Hus Arena; Attendance: 4,591; Referee: Svein Tore Sinnes

7 December 2024 Final	Fredrikstad	0–0 (a.e.t.) (5–4 p)	Molde	Oslo
18:00 CET (UTC+1)	Sørløkk (yellow card) 74'	Report	Bjørnbak (yellow card) 44'; Linnes (yellow card) 56'; Breivik (yellow card) 61'; Eriksen (yellow card) 103'	Stadium: Ullevaal Stadion; Attendance: 23,058; Referee: Sigurd Kringstad
	Penalties
	Bjørlo (penalty scored); Bjartalíð (penalty scored); Hendriksson (penalty scored); Skogvold (penalty scored); Magnússon (penalty scored)		(penalty missed) Haugan; (penalty scored) Stenevik; (penalty scored) Gulbrandsen; (penalty scored) Eikrem; (penalty scored) Løvik

=== UEFA Europa League ===
==== Qualifying rounds ====
25 July 2024 Second qualifying round 1st leg	Molde (Norway)	3–1	(Denmark) Silkeborg	Molde, Norway
19:00 CEST (UTC+2)	Kaasa 2'; Eikrem 45+1'; Eriksen 49'; Hagelskjær (yellow card) 90'	Report	Lind 35' (yellow card) 72'; Adamsen (yellow card) 50'; Sonne (yellow card) 89'	Stadium: Aker Stadion; Attendance: 3,900; Referee: Adam Ladebäck (Sweden)

1 August 2024 Second qualifying round 2nd leg	Silkeborg (Denmark)	3–2 (4–5 agg.)	(Norway) Molde	Silkeborg, Denmark
19:15 CEST (UTC+2)	Adamsen 3' (pen.), 57'; Orazov (red card) 78'; Bakiz 88'	Report	Breivik 22'; Kaasa 81'; Posiadała (yellow card) 90+4'	Stadium: JYSK Park; Attendance: 4,731; Referee: Luka Bilbija (Bosnia and Herzegovina)

8 August 2024 Third qualifying round 1st leg	Molde (Norway)	3–0	(Belgium) Cercle Brugge	Molde, Norway
19:00 CEST (UTC+2)	Eriksen 3'; Wolff Eikrem 18'; Linnes 30'; Breivik (yellow card) 55' (penalty missed) 86'; Lund (yellow card) 79'	Report	Nazinho (yellow card) 61'; Daland (yellow card) 75'	Stadium: Aker Stadion; Attendance: 4,200; Referee: Luis Godinho (Portugal)

15 August 2024 Third qualifying round 2nd leg	Cercle Brugge (Belgium)	1–0 (1–3 agg.)	(Norway) Molde	Bruges, Belgium
20:00 CEST (UTC+2)	Francis (red card) 29'; Ouattara 41'; Nazinho (yellow card) 61'; Somers (yellow card) 88'	Report	Øyvann (yellow card) 26'; Eikrem (yellow card) 44'	Stadium: Jan Breydel Stadium; Attendance: 4,504; Referee: Balázs Berke (Hungary)

22 August 2024 Playoff round 1st leg	Molde (Norway)	0–1	(Sweden) Elfsborg	Molde, Norway
19:00 CEST (UTC+2)	Løvik (yellow card) 26'; Lund (yellow card) 63'; Haugan (yellow card) 84'	Report	Qasem 15' (yellow card) 43'; Pettersson (yellow card) 89'	Stadium: Aker Stadion; Attendance: 4,115; Referee: István Kovács (Romania)

29 August 2024 Playoff round 2nd leg	Elfsborg (Sweden)	0–1 (a.e.t.) (1–1 agg.) (4–2 p)	(Norway) Molde	Borås, Sweden
19:00 CEST (UTC+2)	Ouma (yellow card) 15'; Abdulai (yellow card) 27'; B.Zeneli (yellow card) 27'	Report	Stenevik (yellow card) 39'; Berisha 62'; Dæhli (yellow card) 90'; Hagelskjær (yellow card) 99'; Eriksen (yellow card) 100'	Stadium: Borås Arena; Attendance: 7,619; Referee: Harm Osmers (Germany)
	Penalties
	Baidoo (penalty scored); Hedlund (penalty scored); Zeneli (penalty scored); Hult (penalty scored)		(penalty missed) Kaasa; (penalty scored) Ihler; (penalty missed) Hestad; (penalty scored) Løvik

=== UEFA Conference League ===
==== League phase ====
Pos	Team	Pld	W	D	L	GF	GA	GD	Pts	Qualification
21	(Football Association of Slovenia) Celje	6	2	1	3	13	13	0	7	Advance to knockout phase play-offs (unseeded)
22	(Cyprus Football Association) Omonia	6	2	1	3	7	7	0	7	Advance to knockout phase play-offs (unseeded)
23	(Norwegian Football Federation) Molde	6	2	1	3	10	11	−1	7	Advance to knockout phase play-offs (unseeded)
24	(Football Association of Serbia) TSC	6	2	1	3	10	13	−3	7	Advance to knockout phase play-offs (unseeded)
25	(Scottish Football Association) Heart of Midlothian	6	2	1	3	6	9	−3	7	

Source: UEFA
Rules for classification: League phase tiebreakers

Round	1	2	3	4	5	6
Ground	H	A	A	H	A	H
Result	W	L	L	L	D	W
Position	4	15	22	27	26	23

Updated to match(es) played on 12 December 2024. Source: Results
A = Away; H = Home; W = Win; D = Draw; L = Loss

3 October 2024 1	Molde (Norway)	3–0	(Northern Ireland) Larne	Molde, Norway
18:45 CEST (UTC+2)	Eikrem 51' (yellow card) 72'; Brynhildsen 78'; Enggård (yellow card) 88'; Ihler 90+5'	Report	Todd (yellow card) 17'; McKendry (red card) 90+1'	Stadium: Aker Stadion; Attendance: 3,400; Referee: Dario Bel (Croatia)

24 October 2024 2	Gent (Belgium)	2–1	(Norway) Molde	Ghent, Belgium
18:45 CEST (UTC+2)	Watanabe (yellow card) 10'; Fadiga 24'; Kums (yellow card) 67'; Brown 90+5'	Report	Lund (yellow card) 39'; Eikrem (yellow card) 44'; Dæhli 78'; Bjørnbak (yellow card) 84'	Stadium: Planet Group Arena; Attendance: 8,027; Referee: Goga Kikacheishvili (Georgia)

7 November 2024 3	Jagiellonia Białystok (Poland)	3–0	(Norway) Molde	Białystok, Poland
21:00 CEST (UTC+2)	Pululu 6'; Hansen 70', 75'	Report		Stadium: Białystok Municipal Stadium; Attendance: 12,478; Referee: Miloš Milanović (Serbia)

28 November 2024 4	Molde (Norway)	0–1	(Cyprus) APOEL	Molde, Norway
18:45 CET (UTC+1)	Dæhli (yellow card) 30'; Amundsen (yellow card) 50'; Haugen (yellow card) 70'	Report	Donis (yellow card) 8'; Laifis 41'; Petrović (yellow card) 63'; Ndongala (yellow card) 67'; Bah (yellow card) 88'	Stadium: Aker Stadion; Attendance: 2,916; Referee: Damian Sylwestrzak (Poland)

12 December 2024 5	HJK (Finland)	2–2	(Norway) Molde	Helsinki, Finland
18:45 CET (UTC+1)	Erwin 32'; Lyons-Foster (yellow card) 54'; Lingman (yellow card) 63'; Meriluoto 90+2'; Antzoulas (yellow card) 90+5'	Report	Enggård (yellow card) 4'; Ihler 14', 27'	Stadium: Bolt Arena; Attendance: 4,454; Referee: Atilla Karaoğlan (Turkey)

19 December 2024 6	Molde (Norway)	4–3	(Czech Republic) Mladá Boleslav	Molde, Norway
21:00 CET (UTC+1)	Ihler 27'; Lund (yellow card) 35'; Král 42' (o.g.); Bjørnbak (yellow card) 53'; Kaasa 64'; Stenevik 90+1'	Report	Suchý 5'; Ladra (yellow card) 55'; Kušej 59'; Vydra 61'	Stadium: Aker Stadion; Attendance: 1,750; Referee: Visar Kastrati (Kosovo)

== Squad statistics ==
As of match played 19 December 2024

=== Appearances and goals ===
No.	Pos	Nat	Player	Total		Eliteserien		Norwegian Cup		2023–24 UEFA Europa Conference League		2024–25 UEFA Europa League		2024–25 UEFA Conference League	
No.	Pos	Nat	Player	Apps	Goals	Apps	Goals	Apps	Goals	Apps	Goals	Apps	Goals	Apps	Goals
2	DF	(Norway) NOR	Martin Bjørnbak	13	1	6	1	3	0	0	0	0	0	4	0
3	DF	(Norway) NOR	Casper Øyvann	37	0	20+2	0	3+2	0	2	0	6	0	2	0
4	DF	(Denmark) DEN	Valdemar Lund	32	0	8+8	0	6	0	0	0	4+1	0	4+1	0
5	MF	(Norway) NOR	Eirik Hestad	34	5	12+8	3	2+1	1	3+1	1	0+5	0	0+2	0
7	MF	(Norway) NOR	Magnus Wolff Eikrem	38	16	20+2	12	1+4	1	2	0	6	2	3	1
8	FW	(Norway) NOR	Fredrik Gulbrandsen	18	7	8	2	1+3	0	4	5	0	0	0+2	0
9	FW	(Denmark) DEN	Frederik Ihler	23	7	2+9	2	0+2	1	0	0	1+3	0	2+4	4
10	MF	(Denmark) DEN	Mads Enggård	22	0	5+6	0	2+1	0	0	0	1+1	0	6	0
11	FW	(Nigeria) NGA	Aaron Samuel	18	5	0+13	1	3+1	4	0	0	0+1	0	0	0
14	FW	(Norway) NOR	Veton Berisha	7	1	0+1	0	0	0	2+2	0	0+2	1	0	0
15	MF	(Norway) NOR	Markus Kaasa	37	6	17+3	2	2+1	0	4	1	4+2	2	3+1	1
16	MF	(Norway) NOR	Emil Breivik	47	4	24+4	1	5+2	2	0	0	6	1	6	0
17	MF	(Norway) NOR	Mats Møller Dæhli	39	1	21+1	0	3	0	4	0	6	0	3+1	1
18	MF	(Norway) NOR	Halldor Stenevik	46	5	16+10	3	4+2	0	0+3	1	3+3	0	3+2	1
19	DF	(Norway) NOR	Eirik Haugan	38	4	16+7	4	5+1	0	3	0	2+3	0	0+1	0
20	MF	(Norway) NOR	Kristian Eriksen	49	18	27+1	14	5+1	2	1+2	0	6	2	4+2	0
21	DF	(Norway) NOR	Martin Linnes	34	2	15+5	1	2	0	4	0	3+1	1	3+1	0
22	GK	(Poland) POL	Albert Posiadała	37	0	20	0	6	0	0	0	5	0	6	0
23	MF	(Norway) NOR	Sondre Granaas	19	2	0+9	0	3+2	2	0	0	0	0	1+4	0
24	MF	(Norway) NOR	Johan Bakke	10	0	0+7	0	3	0	0	0	0	0	0	0
25	DF	(Denmark) DEN	Anders Hagelskjær	36	2	14+5	1	1+2	1	4	0	6	0	3+1	0
26	DF	(Norway) NOR	Isak Amundsen	39	0	26	0	3+3	0	0	0	0+1	0	3+3	0
27	FW	(Norway) NOR	Ola Brynhildsen	18	12	11	10	3	1	0	0	0	0	4	1
28	DF	(Norway) NOR	Kristoffer Haugen	28	3	15+2	2	2+1	1	4	0	0	0	2+2	0
29	FW	(Norway) NOR	Gustav Nyheim	9	1	0+5	0	1	1	0+2	0	0+1	0	0	0
31	DF	(Norway) NOR	Mathias Løvik	45	4	15+9	4	5+2	0	3	0	6	0	4+1	0
33	MF	(Norway) NOR	Niklas Ødegård	11	0	0+7	0	0	0	0+3	0	0	0	0+1	0
34	GK	(Republic of Ireland) IRL	Sean McDermott	3	0	2	0	1	0	0	0	0	0	0	0
Players away from Molde on loan:
1	GK	(Norway) NOR	Jacob Karlstrøm	9	0	8	0	0	0	0	0	1	0	0	0
6	MF	(Norway) NOR	Alwande Roaldsøy	10	0	1+7	0	2	0	0	0	0	0	0	0
12	GK	(Norway) NOR	Oliver Petersen	4	0	0	0	0	0	4	0	0	0	0	0
30	MF	(Norway) NOR	Leon-Robin Juberg-Hovland	1	1	0	0	1	1	0	0	0	0	0	0
Players who appeared for Molde no longer at the club:
10	MF	(Norway) NOR	Eric Kitolano	2	0	0	0	0	0	0+2	0	0	0	0	0

=== Goal scorers ===
Rank	Pos.	No.	Nat.	Player	Eliteserien	Norwegian Cup	2023–24 UEFA Europa Conference League	2024–25 UEFA Europa League	2024–25 UEFA Conference League	Total
1	MF	7	(Norway)	Magnus Wolff Eikrem	14	2	0	2	1	20
2	MF	20	(Norway)	Kristian Eriksen	12	1	0	2	0	15
3	FW	27	(Norway)	Ola Brynhildsen	10	1	0	0	1	12
4	FW	8	(Norway)	Fredrik Gulbrandsen	2	0	5	0	0	7
4	FW	9	(Denmark)	Frederik Ihler	2	1	0	0	4	7
6	MF	15	(Norway)	Markus Kaasa	2	0	1	2	1	6
7	MF	5	(Norway)	Eirik Hestad	3	1	1	0	0	5
7	FW	11	(Nigeria)	Aaron Samuel	1	4	0	0	0	5
7	MF	18	(Norway)	Halldor Stenevik	3	0	1	0	1	5
10	DF	31	(Norway)	Mathias Løvik	4	0	0	0	0	4
10	DF	19	(Norway)	Eirik Haugan	4	0	0	0	0	4
10	MF	16	(Norway)	Emil Breivik	1	2	0	1	0	4
13	DF	28	(Norway)	Kristoffer Haugen	2	1	0	0	0	3
14	DF	25	(Denmark)	Anders Hagelskjær	1	1	0	0	0	2
14	DF	21	(Norway)	Martin Linnes	1	0	0	1	0	2
14	MF	23	(Norway)	Sondre Granaas	0	2	0	0	0	2
14				Own goal	1	0	0	0	1	2
18	DF	2	(Norway)	Martin Bjørnbak	1	0	0	0	0	1
18	FW	29	(Norway)	Gustav Nyheim	0	1	0	0	0	1
18	MF	30	(Norway)	Leon-Robin Juberg-Hovland	0	1	0	0	0	1
18	FW	14	(Norway)	Veton Berisha	0	0	0	1	0	1
18	MF	17	(Norway)	Mats Møller Dæhli	0	0	0	0	1	1
TOTALS					64	18	8	8	10	108

=== Clean sheets ===
Rank	Pos.	No.	Nat.	Player	Eliteserien	Norwegian Cup	2023–24 UEFA Europa Conference League	2024–25 UEFA Europa League	2024–25 UEFA Conference League	Total
1	GK	22	(Poland)	Albert Posiadała	7	2	0	2	1	12
2	GK	1	(Norway)	Jacob Karlstrøm	3	0	0	0	0	3
3	GK	34	(Republic of Ireland)	Sean McDermott	0	1	0	0	0	1
3	GK	12	(Norway)	Oliver Petersen	0	0	1	0	0	1
TOTALS					9	3	1	2	1	16

=== Disciplinary record ===
No.	Pos.	Nat.	Name	Eliteserien		Norwegian Cup		2023–24 UEFA Europa Conference League		2024–25 UEFA Europa League		2024–25 UEFA Conference League		Total	
No.	Pos.	Nat.	Name	Booked	Sent off (straight red)	Booked	Sent off (straight red)	Booked	Sent off (straight red)	Booked	Sent off (straight red)	Booked	Sent off (straight red)	Booked	Sent off (straight red)
2	DF	(Norway)	Martin Bjørnbak	0	0	1	0	0	0	0	0	1	0	2	0
3	DF	(Norway)	Casper Øyvann	0	0	0	0	0	0	1	0	1	0	2	0
4	DF	(Denmark)	Valdemar Lund	4	0	0	0	0	0	2	0	2	0	8	0
5	MF	(Norway)	Eirik Hestad	1	0	0	0	1	0	0	0	0	0	2	0
7	MF	(Norway)	Magnus Wolff Eikrem	0	0	0	0	0	0	1	0	2	0	3	0
8	FW	(Norway)	Fredrik Gulbrandsen	3	0	0	0	2	0	0	0	0	0	5	0
10	MF	(Denmark)	Mads Enggård	0	0	0	0	0	0	0	0	2	0	2	0
15	MF	(Norway)	Markus Kaasa	1	0	0	0	1	0	0	0	0	0	2	0
16	MF	(Norway)	Emil Breivik	4	0	2	0	0	0	1	0	0	0	7	0
17	MF	(Norway)	Mats Møller Dæhli	2	0	1	0	0	0	1	0	1	0	5	0
18	MF	(Norway)	Halldor Stenevik	1	0	0	0	0	0	1	0	0	0	2	0
19	DF	(Norway)	Eirik Haugan	2	0	1	0	1	0	1	0	0	0	5	0
20	MF	(Norway)	Kristian Eriksen	7	0	1	0	1	0	1	0	0	0	10	0
21	DF	(Norway)	Martin Linnes	1	0	1	0	1	0	0	0	0	0	3	0
22	GK	(Poland)	Albert Posiadała	2	0	0	0	0	0	1	0	0	0	3	0
25	DF	(Denmark)	Anders Hagelskjær	2	0	1	0	2	0	2	0	0	0	7	0
26	DF	(Norway)	Isak Amundsen	6	0	1	0	0	0	0	0	1	0	8	0
27	FW	(Norway)	Ola Brynhildsen	3	0	0	0	0	0	0	0	0	0	3	0
28	DF	(Norway)	Kristoffer Haugen	2	0	0	0	0	0	0	0	1	0	3	0
31	DF	(Norway)	Mathias Løvik	4	0	1	0	1	0	1	0	0	0	7	0
33	MF	(Norway)	Niklas Ødegård	0	0	1	0	1	0	0	0	0	0	2	0
Players away from Molde on loan:
Players who appeared for Molde no longer at the club:
TOTALS				45	0	11	0	11	0	13	0	11	0	91	0

== See also ==
- Molde FK seasons
