= Alwande Roaldsøy =

Norwegian footballer (born 2004)

Personal information
- Full name: Alwande Benedict Roaldsøy
- Date of birth: 9 June 2004 (age 22)
- Place of birth: Lørenskog, Norway
- Height: 1.93 m (6 ft 4 in)
- Position: Midfielder

Team information
- Current team: Sparta Rotterdam
- Number: 16

Youth career
- –2019: Drøbak-Frogn
- 2020–2023: Atalanta

Senior career*
Years	Team	Apps	(Gls)
2019	Drøbak-Frogn	15	(0)
2023–2024	Atalanta U23	6	(0)
2024–2026	Molde	16	(1)
2024	→ Sandnes Ulf (loan)	10	(0)
2025	→ HamKam (loan)	19	(4)
2026–	Sparta Rotterdam	9	(0)

International career^{‡}
2019	Norway U15	4	(1)
2021	Norway U17	4	(0)
2022	Norway U18	11	(1)
2023	Norway U19	5	(3)
2023	Norway U20	1	(0)
2023–2025	Norway U21	5	(0)
- * Club domestic league appearances and goals as of 17 October 2026 ‡ National team caps and goals as of 18 November 2025

Alwande Benedict Roaldsøy (born 9 June 2004) is a Norwegian footballer who plays as a midfielder for Eredivisie club Sparta Rotterdam.

== Early life ==
Roaldsøy was born to a South African mother and a Norwegian father.

== Career ==
Roaldsøy played for Italian side Atalanta U23s.

On 11 January 2024, Molde announced the signing of Roaldsøy from Atalanta to a three-year contract, with Atalanta stating the move would happen on 31 January 2024 when the Norwegian transfer window opened.

After spending the first half of the 2024 season at Molde, Roaldsøy was loaned out to Sandnes Ulf for the latter half of the season.

Before the start of the 2025 season, Roaldsøy was once again loaned out, this time to HamKam.

On 20 January 2026, Roaldsøy signed a four-and-a-half-year contract with Sparta Rotterdam in the Netherlands.

== Career statistics ==
As of 28 October 2026

Appearances and goals by club, season and competition
Club	Season	League			National Cup		Total	
Club	Season	Division	Apps	Goals	Apps	Goals	Apps	Goals
Drøbak-Frogn	2019	3. divisjon	15	0	0	0	15	0
Atalanta U23	2023-24	Serie C	6	0	—		6	0
Molde	2024	Eliteserien	8	0	2	0	10	0
Molde	2025	Eliteserien	8	1	1	0	9	1
Molde	Total		16	1	3	0	19	1
Sandnes Ulf (loan)	2024	1. divisjon	10	0	2	1	12	1
HamKam (loan)	2025	Eliteserien	19	4	4	1	23	5
Sparta Rotterdam	2025–26	Eredivisie	4	0	—		4	0
Sparta Rotterdam	2026–27	Eredivisie	5	0	1	0	6	0
Sparta Rotterdam	Total		9	0	1	0	10	0
Career total			75	5	10	2	85	7
