= Magnus Wolff Eikrem =

Norwegian footballer (born 1990)

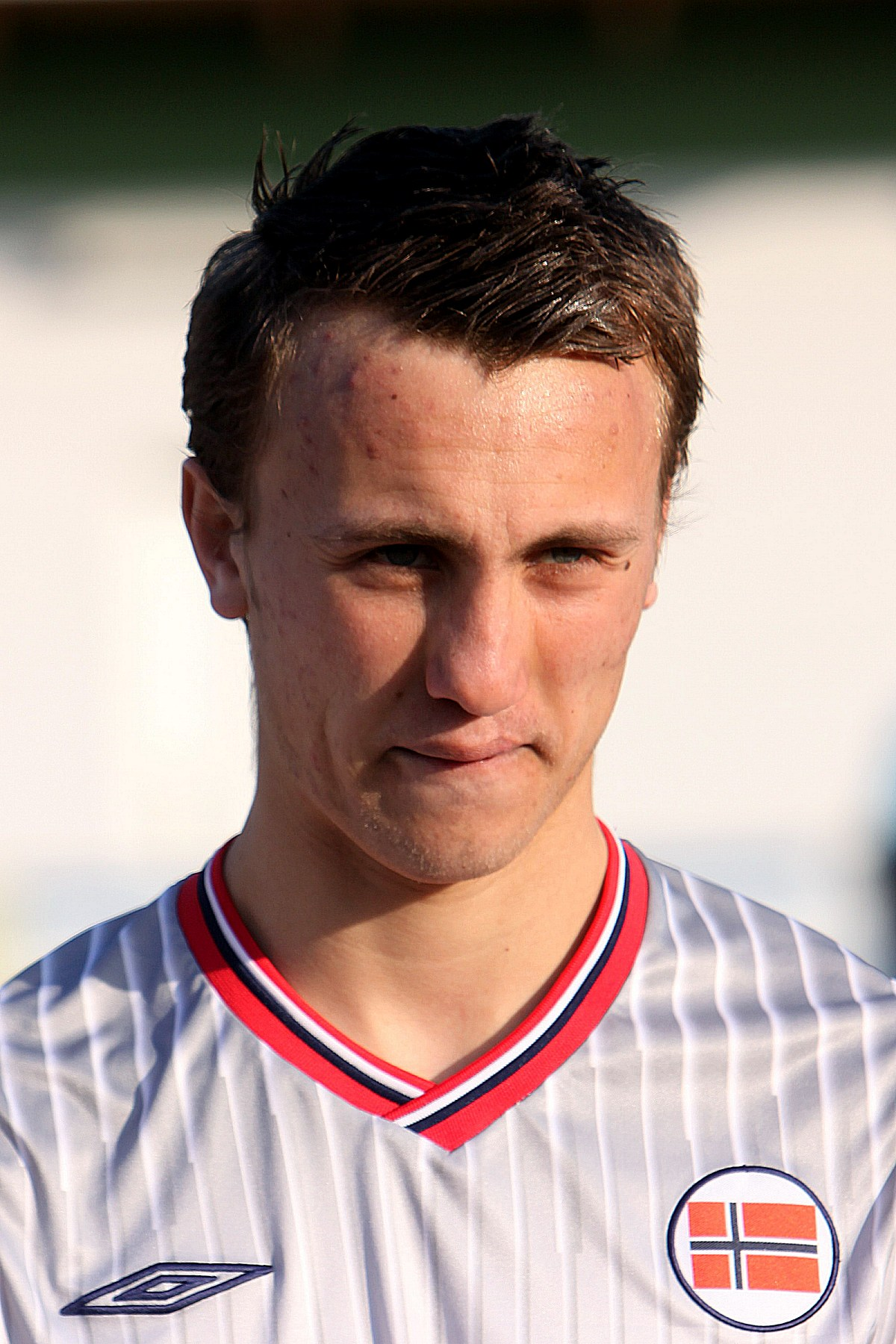
- Eikrem with Norway U21 in 2011

Personal information
- Full name: Magnus Wolff Eikrem
- Date of birth: 8 August 1990 (age 36)
- Place of birth: Molde, Norway
- Height: 1.73 m (5 ft 8 in)
- Position: Midfielder

Team information
- Current team: KFUM
- Number: 23

Youth career
- 2002–2006: Molde
- 2006–2009: Manchester United

Senior career*
Years	Team	Apps	(Gls)
2009–2011	Manchester United	0	(0)
2011–2013	Molde	68	(6)
2013–2014	Heerenveen	13	(2)
2014	Cardiff City	9	(0)
2015–2018	Malmö FF	66	(12)
2018	Seattle Sounders	15	(1)
2018–2025	Molde	181	(54)
2026–	KFUM	13	(2)

International career^{‡}
2007	Norway U17	1	(0)
2008–2009	Norway U19	5	(0)
2010–2013	Norway U21	12	(2)
2012–2016	Norway	17	(0)
- * Club domestic league appearances and goals as of 12 November 2026 ‡ National team caps and goals as of 25 September 2016

Magnus Wolff Eikrem (born 8 August 1990) is a Norwegian professional footballer who currently plays for Eliteserien side KFUM. His regular playing position is in attacking midfield, though he can play anywhere across the midfield.

== Career ==
=== Early years ===
Born in Molde, Eikrem began his football career as a 12-year-old with his local club, Molde FK. He was picked up after he attended one of Ole Gunnar Solskjær's soccer schools in Norway, despite the schools being for youngsters aged 14–16. Nevertheless, he impressed the coaches so much that they allowed him to attend, and he was signed by Manchester United on his 16th birthday.

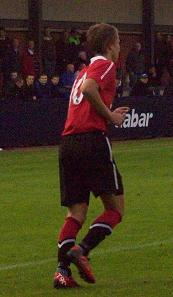
Eikrem playing for Manchester United Reserves in 2010.

=== Manchester United ===
Eikrem was a regular starter for the United under-18 side in the 2006–07 season, and helped the team to the final of the FA Youth Cup, where they lost to Liverpool 4–3 on penalties after the two-legged match finished 2–2 on aggregate. Eikrem was one of two United players to miss a penalty in the shoot-out, the other being captain Sam Hewson. Eikrem also captained the Manchester United youth team to the final of the 2007 Milk Cup but United lost in stoppage time to Brazilian side Fluminense. A few days later, he played in his first game for the Manchester United first team, coming on as a substitute for Ryan Giggs in a 4–0 pre-season friendly win away to Dunfermline Athletic.

Eikrem continued as a regular member of the under-18 side throughout the 2007–08 season, making the odd appearance on the reserve team bench, before becoming a full member of the reserve side in 2008–09. During the season, he helped United to second place in the 2008–09 Premier Reserve League, as well as a cup double over Bolton Wanderers in the Manchester and Lancashire Senior Cups.

After playing in the reserve team's first four games of the 2009–10 season and scoring in a 2–1 league win over Wigan Athletic, Eikrem was rewarded by being given the number 42 shirt for the first team's League Cup third round match against Wolverhampton Wanderers. For the 2010–11 football season, Eikrem was named as a member of United's Champions League squad. He was named as a member of a "B-squad" alongside several other younger players such as Will Keane, Joe Dudgeon, Oliver Gill, Ben Amos and Corry Evans.

=== Molde ===
In January 2011, Eikrem transferred back to Norwegian team Molde, who were managed by former Manchester United reserve team manager Ole Gunnar Solskjær. In his first season, Eikrem was involved in the Molde squad that won Tippeligaen for the first time. He helped successfully defend the title in the 2012 Tippeligaen season.

=== Heerenveen ===
On 24 June 2013, Eikrem signed a four-year contract for Heerenveen. He made his debut in the Eredivisie in a 4–2 home win against AZ. He scored his first goal for Heerenveen on 23 August 2013, against defending champions Ajax.

=== Cardiff City ===
On 8 January 2014, Welsh side Cardiff City announced that Eikrem had signed a contract with the club, for an undisclosed fee and duration. He made his debut three days later, coming on as a 66th-minute substitute for Gary Medel in a 2–0 home defeat against West Ham United. He went on to make six top-flight appearances as Cardiff were relegated back to the second tier.

After a poor start to the 2014–15 season, Solskjaer was sacked and his replacement, Russell Slade, placed Eikrem on the transfer list. On 19 December 2014, Eikrem had his contract terminated by mutual consent after not playing under Slade.

=== Malmö FF ===
On 26 January 2015, Eikrem signed a three-year contract with Swedish champions Malmö FF. On 22 February 2015, Eikrem scored one goal and made two assists in his first competitive match for the club, a cup fixture against Assyriska FF that Malmö won 3–0.

=== Seattle Sounders FC ===
Eikrem joined Seattle Sounders FC on 30 January 2018. He was waived on 20 July 2018.

=== Return to Molde ===
On 25 July 2018, Eikrem returned to Molde after five years away, signing a four-and-a-half-year contract. The day after, on 26 July, he made his first appearance since returning to the club as a 65th minute substitute in a 3–0 home victory over Laçi in the Europa League. He played an important role in Molde's title-winning season in 2019, and was nominated to the Eliteserien Player of the Year award. Eikrem finished the 2019 season with 13 goals in 33 appearances in all competitions.

Ahead of the 2020 season, on 17 January, Eikrem was announced as Molde's new captain.

=== KFUM ===
On 16 February 2026, KFUM announced that Eikrem had signed a two-year contract with the club. He made his debut for KFUM as an 80th minute substitute in their 2–0 home win against IK Start in the 2026 Eliteserien.

== International career ==
Eikrem received his first international call-up to the under-21s alongside Manchester United teammate Joshua King in November 2010. Eikrem made his debut for the senior team when he replaced Markus Henriksen as a substitute in the 75th minute in a 1-1 friendly draw against Denmark on 15 January 2012.

== Personal life ==
Eikrem is the son of former Molde player, Knut Hallvard Eikrem, who made over 220 appearances for the club in his time there. Eikrem has been diagnosed with diabetes mellitus.

== Career statistics ==
=== Club ===
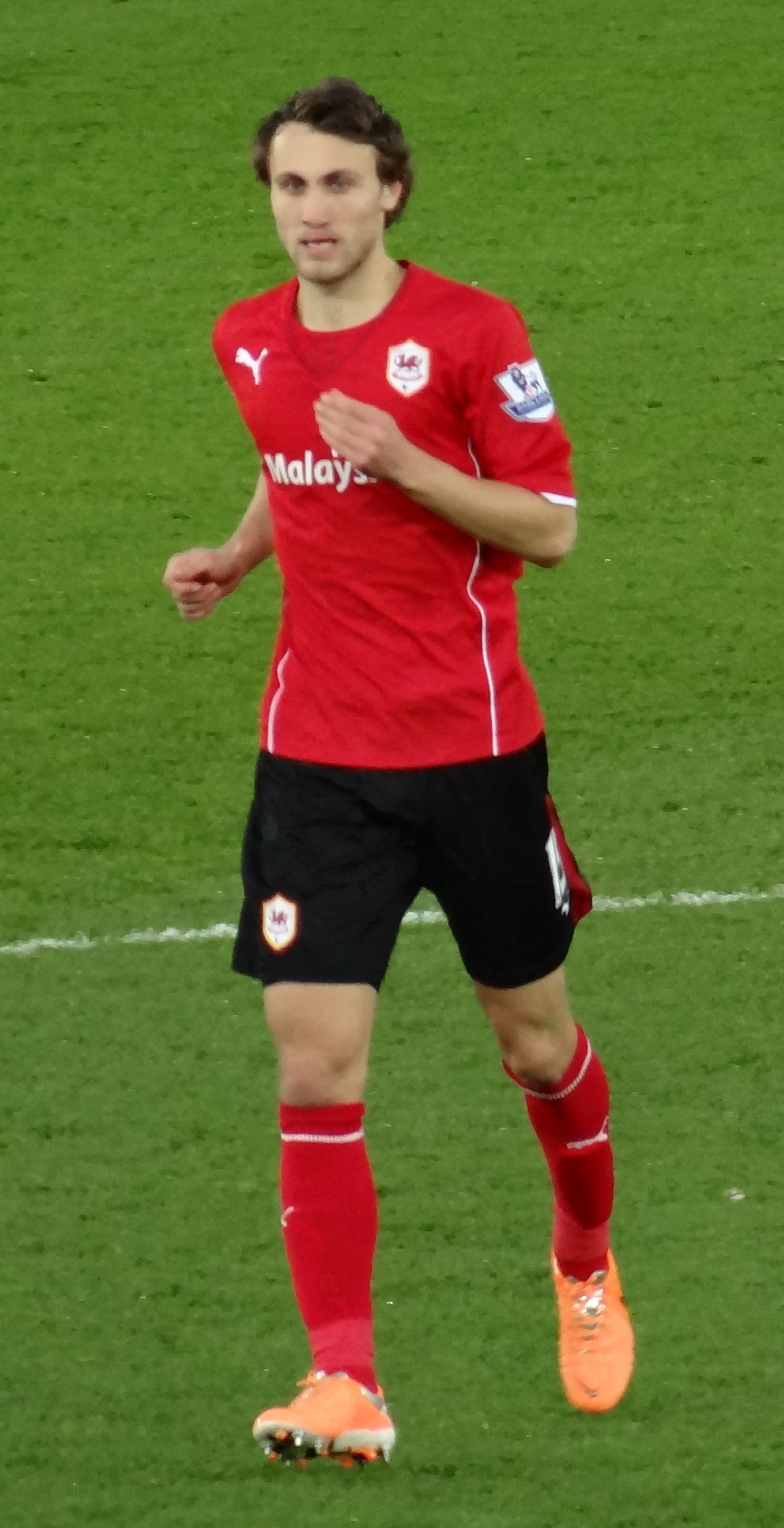
Eikrem made his Cardiff City debut at home to West Ham United on 11 January 2014.

As of match played 1 November 2026

Appearances and goals by club, season and competition
Club	Season	League			National cup (Note: Includes Norwegian Football Cup, Svenska Cupen, FA Cup, KNVB Cup)		League cup (Note: Includes Football League Cup)		Continental		Total	
Club	Season	Division	Apps	Goals	Apps	Goals	Apps	Goals	Apps	Goals	Apps	Goals
Molde	2011	Tippeligaen	28	4	3	1	–		–		31	5
Molde	2012	Tippeligaen	27	0	4	1	–		10	2	41	3
Molde	2013	Tippeligaen	13	2	1	1	–		–		14	3
Molde	Total		68	6	8	3	0	0	10	2	86	11
Heerenveen	2013–14	Eredivisie	13	2	3	0	–		–		16	2
Cardiff City	2013–14	Premier League	6	0	2	0	–		–		8	0
Cardiff City	2014–15	Championship	3	0	0	0	2	0	–		5	0
Cardiff City	Total		9	0	2	0	2	0	0	0	13	0
Malmö	2015	Allsvenskan	28	7	5	3	–		7 (Note: Appearances in UEFA Champions League)	0	40	10
Malmö	2016	Allsvenskan	23	4	5	1	–		–		28	5
Malmö	2017	Allsvenskan	15	1	0	0	–		2	0	17	1
Malmö	Total		66	12	10	4	0	0	9	0	85	16
Seattle Sounders FC	2018	Major League Soccer	16	1	0	0	–		2 (Note: Appearances in CONCACAF Champions League)	1	18	2
Molde	2018	Eliteserien	14	4	0	0	–		6 (Note: Appearances in UEFA Europa League)	0	20	4
Molde	2019	Eliteserien	25	11	1	0	–		7	2	33	13
Molde	2020	Eliteserien	27	7	0	0	–		15 (Note: Five appearances in UEFA Champions League, ten appearances in UEFA Europa League)	5	42	12
Molde	2021	Eliteserien	24	5	1	0	–		4 (Note: Appearances in UEFA Europa Conference League)	1	29	6
Molde	2022	Eliteserien	21	6	5	3	–		8	0	34	9
Molde	2023	Eliteserien	20	6	4	1	–		11 (Note: Six appearances in UEFA Champions League, five appearances in UEFA Conference League)	3	33	10
Molde	2024	Eliteserien	23	12	3	1	–		9 (Note: Six appearances in UEFA Europa League, three appearances in Europa Conference League)	3	35	16
Molde	2025	Eliteserien	27	3	5	3	–		3	1	35	7
Molde	Total		181	54	19	8	0	0	63	15	262	77
KFUM	2026	Eliteserien	13	2	1	0	–		–		14	2
Career total			366	77	43	15	2	0	82	17	493	109

=== International ===
Appearances and goals by national team and year

As of 4 July 2015

National team	Year	Apps	Goals
Norway	2012	8	0
Norway	2013	7	0
Norway	2014	0	0
Norway	2015	1	0
Total		16	0

== Honours ==
Molde

- Eliteserien: 2011, 2012, 2019, 2022
- Norwegian Cup: 2013, 2021, 2023

Malmö FF

- Allsvenskan: 2016, 2017

Individual

- Eliteserien Player of the Month: November 2021, September 2024
