= Neraysho Kasanwirjo =

Dutch footballer (born 2002)

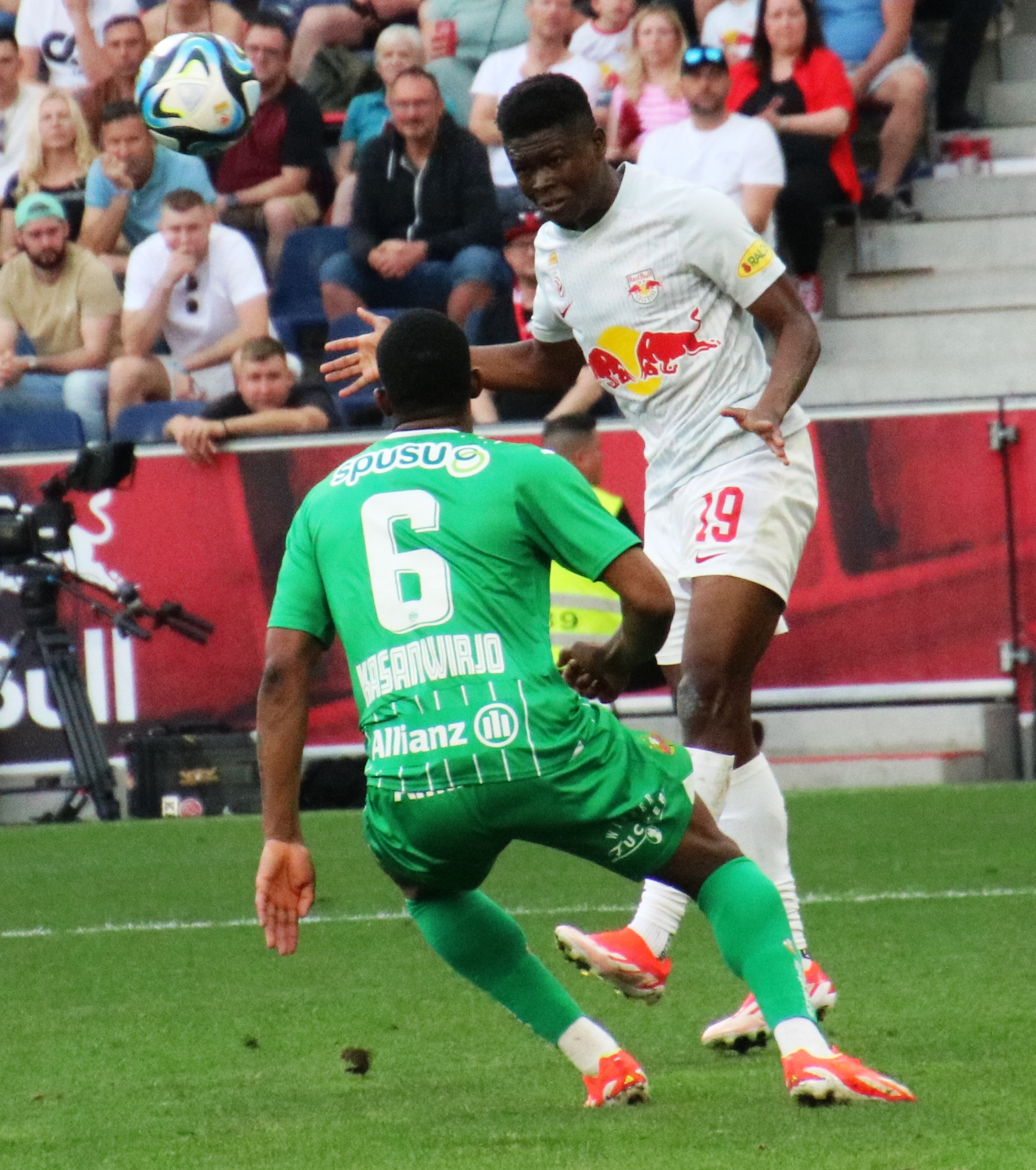

Personal information
- Full name: Neraysho Meritchio Kasanwirjo
- Date of birth: 18 February 2002 (age 24)
- Place of birth: Amsterdam, Netherlands
- Height: 1.85 m (6 ft 1 in)
- Position: Defender

Team information
- Current team: Brann
- Number: 21

Youth career
- Zeeburgia
- 2011–2020: Ajax

Senior career*
Years	Team	Apps	(Gls)
2019–2021	Jong Ajax	38	(1)
2021–2023	Groningen	47	(1)
2023–2026	Feyenoord	7	(0)
2023–2024	→ Rapid Wien (loan)	23	(0)
2024–2025	→ Rangers (loan)	9	(0)
2025–2026	→ Molde (loan)	7	(0)
2026	→ Fortuna Sittard (loan)	16	(0)
2026–	Brann	4	(0)

International career^{‡}
2017	Netherlands U15	4	(1)
2017–2018	Netherlands U16	7	(1)
2018–2019	Netherlands U17	13	(1)
2021–2024	Netherlands U21	7	(0)
Medal record
Representing Netherlands
UEFA European Under-17 Championship
Winner	Ireland 2019	U-17 Team
- * Club domestic league appearances and goals as of 9 October 2026 ‡ National team caps and goals as of 21 March 2024

Neraysho Meritchio Kasanwirjo (born 18 February 2002) is a Dutch professional footballer who plays as a full-back or centre-back for Eliteserien club SK Brann.

== Club career ==
=== Ajax ===
Born in Amsterdam, Kasanwirjo started playing in the youth ranks of Zeeburgia before being scouted and joining the Ajax Youth Academy at the age of nine. Progressing through the ranks, he made his professional debut in the Eerste Divisie, the second tier of professional football in the Netherlands, playing for Jong Ajax, the reserves team of Ajax. On 19 August 2019, Kasanwirjo made his debut against NEC in a 3–3 draw.

=== Groningen ===
On 10 May 2021, it was announced that Groningen had signed Kasanwirjo on a three-year contract, joining the club for the 2021–22 season after his contract with Ajax had ended.

=== Feyenoord ===
On 20 January 2023, Feyenoord announced that it had reached a deal with Groningen for the transfer of Kasanwirjo, with the player signing a contract for four and a half years.

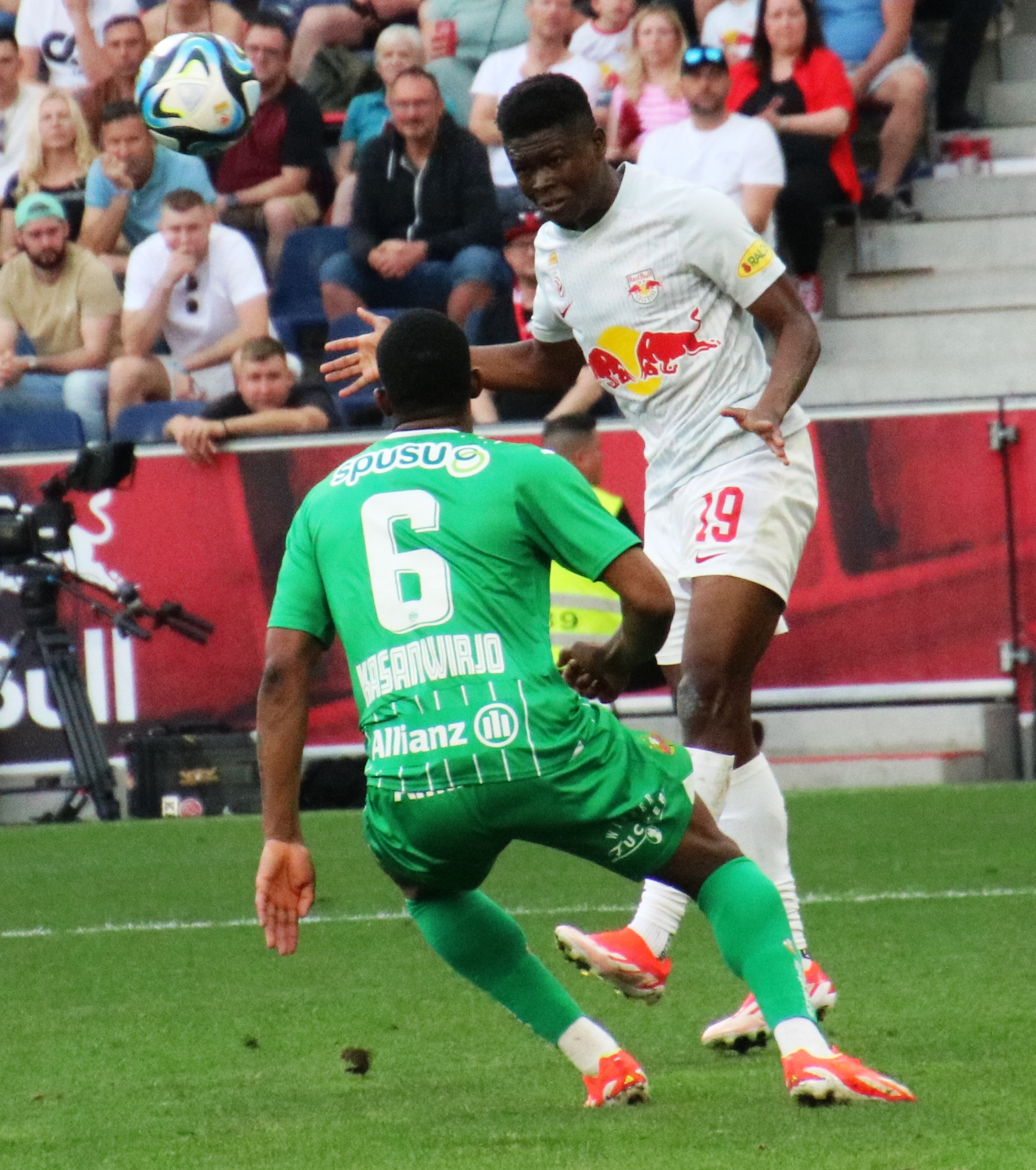
Kasanwirjo (left) with Rapid Wien in 2023

==== Rapid Wien (loan) ====
On 1 September 2023, Feyenoord and Rapid Wien announced that Kasanwirjo would spend the rest of the season at the Austrian club.

==== Rangers (loan) ====
On 21 September 2024, Kasanwirjo made his Rangers debut in a 3–0 win over Dundee in the Scottish League Cup quarter-final, coming off the bench to replace captain James Tavernier. He made his full debut for the club just five days later, starting at left-back in a 2–0 win away at Malmo in matchday one of the UEFA Europa League. On 1 December 2024, it was confirmed that Kasanwirjo suffered a knee injury whilst playing for Netherlands U21 and would return to his parent side Feyenoord to complete his rehabilitation. Kasanwirjo returned to the Rangers first-team towards the end of the season but failed to secure a permanent transfer at the end of his loan spell.

==== Fortuna Sittard (loan) ====
On 6 January 2026, he was loaned by Fortuna Sittard.

== International career ==
Kasanwirjo is a youth international for the Netherlands.

== Personal life ==
Born in the Netherlands, Kasanwirjo is of Surinamese and Indonesian descent.

== Career statistics ==
As of match played 15 October 2026.

Appearances and goals by club, season and competition
Club	Season	League			Cup		League Cup		Continental		Total	
Club	Season	Division	Apps	Goals	Apps	Goals	Apps	Goals	Apps	Goals	Apps	Goals
Jong Ajax	2019–20	Eerste Divisie	4	0	0	0	–		–		4	0
Jong Ajax	2020–21	Eerste Divisie	34	1	0	0	–		–		34	1
Jong Ajax	Total		38	1	0	0	–		–		38	1
FC Groningen	2021–22	Eredivisie	32	1	3	0	–		–		35	1
FC Groningen	2022–23	Eredivisie	15	0	2	2	–		–		17	2
FC Groningen	Total		47	1	5	2	–		–		52	3
Feyenoord	2022–23	Eredivisie	5	0	2	0	0	0	7	0		
Feyenoord	2024–25	Eredivisie	2	0	0	0	–		0	0	2	0
Feyenoord	Total		7	0	2	0	–		0	0	9	0
Rapid Wien (loan)	2023–24	Austrian Bundesliga	23	0	4	0	–		–		27	0
Rangers (loan)	2024–25	Scottish Premiership	9	0	0	0	2	0	4 (Note: Appearances in UEFA Europa League)	0	15	0
Molde (loan)	2025	Eliteserien	7	0	1	0	–		–		8	0
Fortuna Sittard (loan)	2025–26	Eredivisie	16	0	–		–		–		16	0
Brann	2026	Eliteserien	4	0	1	0	–		1 (Note: Appearances in UEFA Conference League)	0	6	0
Career total			152	2	13	2	2	0	5	0	171	4

== Honours ==
Feyenoord

- Eredivisie: 2022–23
- Johan Cruyff Shield: 2024

Netherlands U17

- UEFA European Under-17 Championship: 2019
