= Valdemar Lund =

Danish footballer (born 2003)

Personal information
- Full name: Valdemar Lund Jensen
- Date of birth: 28 May 2003 (age 23)
- Place of birth: Sundby, Denmark
- Height: 1.93 m (6 ft 4 in)
- Position: Centre-back

Team information
- Current team: Vejle (on loan from Molde)
- Number: 5

Youth career
- Sundby Boldklub
- Tårnby
- Copenhagen

Senior career*
| Years | Team | Apps | (Gls) |
| 2021–2024 | Copenhagen | 27 | (2) |
| 2024– | Molde | 25 | (0) |
| 2025– | → Vejle (loan) | 18 | (0) |

International career^{‡}
| 2018–2019 | Denmark U16 | 6 | (0) |
| 2019–2020 | Denmark U17 | 9 | (5) |
| 2020 | Denmark U18 | 2 | (0) |
| 2021 | Denmark U19 | 4 | (0) |
| 2021– | Denmark U21 | 4 | (0) |
- * Club domestic league appearances and goals as of 19 May 2026 ‡ National team caps and goals as of 7 September 2023

Valdemar Lund Jensen (born 28 May 2003) is a Danish professional footballer who plays as a centre-back for Vejle, on loan from Molde.

== Early career ==
Born in Sundby, Denmark, Valdemar played with Sundby Boldklub and AB Tårnby, before entering the FC Copenhagen youth system, becoming captain of the club's under-19s, and signing his first professional contract on 20 December 2020, tying him to the club until June 2023.

== Club career ==
He made his professional and Danish Superliga debut as a late substitute with Copenhagen, replacing William Bøving in a 3–0 win over Vejle on 31 October 2021. Tipped as a promising prospective first team player, he injured his hip in November that same year, requiring an operation and only allowing a return late in the season.

On 12 August 2022, he scored his first senior goal in a 3–1 home loss to Randers.

On February 1, 2024, he joined the Norwegian club Molde. He was loaned to Vejle with a purchase option on August 18, 2025.

== International career ==
He is a youth international for Denmark, having played with all the teams from U16 to U20.

== Career statistics ==
=== Club ===
As of match played 13 December 2025

Appearances and goals by club, season and competition
| Club | Season | League | | | Cup (Note: Includes Danish Cup, Norwegian Football Cup) | | Europe | | Total | |
| Club | Season | Division | Apps | Goals | Apps | Goals | Apps | Goals | Apps | Goals |
|---|---|---|---|---|---|---|---|---|---|---|
| Copenhagen | 2021–22 | Danish Superliga | 3 | 0 | 0 | 0 | 0 | 0 | 3 | 0 |
| Copenhagen | 2022–23 | Danish Superliga | 19 | 1 | 7 | 0 | 5 (Note: Appearances in UEFA Champions League) | 0 | 31 | 1 |
| Copenhagen | 2023–24 | Danish Superliga | 5 | 1 | 1 | 0 | 2 | 0 | 8 | 1 |
| Copenhagen | Total | | 27 | 2 | 8 | 0 | 7 | 0 | 39 | 2 |
| Molde | 2024 | Eliteserien | 16 | 0 | 6 | 0 | 10 (Note: Appearances in UEFA Europa League), (Note: Appearances in UEFA Conference League) | 0 | 32 | 0 |
| Molde | 2025 | Eliteserien | 9 | 0 | 3 | 0 | 3 | 0 | 15 | 0 |
| Molde | Total | | 25 | 0 | 9 | 0 | 13 | 0 | 47 | 0 |
| Vejle | 2025–26 | Danish Superliga | 5 | 0 | 5 | 0 | 0 | 0 | 10 | 0 |
| Vejle | Career total | | 57 | 2 | 17 | 0 | 20 | 0 | 99 | 2 |

== Honours ==
Copenhagen

- Danish Superliga: 2021–22, 2022–23
- Danish Cup: 2022–23
