= Blerton Isufi =

Footballer (born 2006)

Personal information
- Date of birth: 14 February 2006 (age 20)
- Place of birth: Fredrikstad, Norway
- Height: 1.85 m (6 ft 1 in)
- Position: Attacking midfielder

Team information
- Current team: HamKam (on loan from Molde)
- Number: 29

Youth career
- 2015–201?: Trosvik
- 201?–2018: Kråkerøy
- 2019–2023: Fredrikstad
- 2023–2024: Moss

Senior career*
Years	Team	Apps	(Gls)
2023	Moss 2	19	(4)
2024–2025	Moss	20	(6)
2025–	Molde	4	(0)
2025	→ Moss (loan)	5	(0)
2025	→ Sandefjord (loan)	4	(0)
2026–	→ HamKam (loan)	7	(1)

International career^{‡}
2026–	Kosovo U21	2	(0)
- * Club domestic league appearances and goals as of 16 October 2026 ‡ National team caps and goals as of 30 September 2026

Blerton Isufi (born 14 February 2006) is a professional footballer who plays as an attacking midfielder for HamKam, on loan from Molde. Born in Norway, he is a Kosovo youth international.

== Club career ==
=== Early career ===
Isufi was born in Fredrikstad, Norway. He moved to Pristina, Kosovo at the age of four and lived there until he was nine, when he returned to Norway and resumed his schooling and organised football activities.

Isufi began playing football with Trosvik before moving to Kråkerøy and Fredrikstad. He subsequently joined Moss, where he progressed through the youth setup and the club's IPOA academy before reaching the senior team.

=== Moss ===
Isufi joined Moss's junior team ahead of the 2023 season, initially arriving on loan from Fredrikstad. The transfer was made permanent in 2024. In July 2024, Moss announced that Isufi had signed his first senior-team contract with the club. He made his senior debut on 19 August 2024, coming on as a substitute in Moss's 3–0 home victory over Sogndal in the Norwegian First Division.

=== Molde ===
On 29 July 2025, Isufi signed a four-year contract with Molde, completing a transfer from Moss. The agreement initially provided for him to remain at Moss on loan until the end of the 2025 season before joining Molde's squad. However, Molde recalled Isufi from his loan on 9 September 2025, making him available for the club's senior team.

==== Loan to Sandefjord ====
On 30 September 2025, Molde loaned Isufi to Sandefjord for the remainder of the season. Sandefjord confirmed the arrival of the midfielder on loan, explaining that the agreement was intended to provide him with opportunities for regular first-team football.

Isufi made four appearances for Sandefjord in the Eliteserien during the 2025 season, gaining experience in Norway's top division.

==== Loan to HamKam ====
On 25 July 2026, Isufi joined HamKam on loan from Molde until the end of the 2026 season. The agreement was intended to provide him with more regular playing time in the Eliteserien.

== International career ==
On 30 August 2025, Isufi received a call-up from Kosovo U21 for the UEFA Euro 2027 qualification matches against Romania and Spain, but he was an unused substitute in these matches.

In May 2026, reports emerged that Isufi might switch his international allegiance to the Albania U21 team, with the latter including him in its squad for friendly matches against Slovenia and Italy. However, Isufi disputed the call-up, stating that the Albanian Football Federation and head coach Alban Bushi had included him in the squad without his consent and that he did not plan to abandon his allegiance to Kosovo.

On 19 September 2026, Isufi received again a call-up from Kosovo U21 for the for the UEFA Euro 2027 qualification matches against San Marino, Cyprus and Finland. His debut with Kosovo U21 came five days later in the UEFA Euro 2027 qualification match against San Marino after being named in the starting line-up.
