= Albert Posiadała =

Polish footballer (born 2003)

Personal information
- Full name: Albert Posiadała
- Date of birth: 25 February 2003 (age 23)
- Place of birth: Siedlce, Poland
- Height: 1.93 m (6 ft 4 in)
- Position: Goalkeeper

Team information
- Current team: Molde
- Number: 22

Youth career
- 2012–2018: Pogoń Siedlce

Senior career*
Years	Team	Apps	(Gls)
2018–2021	Pogoń Siedlce II	28	(0)
2019–2021	Pogoń Siedlce	2	(0)
2021–2022	Świt NDM	13	(0)
2022–2024	Radomiak Radom	16	(0)
2022	→ Świt NDM (loan)	12	(0)
2022	→ Wisła Puławy (loan)	9	(0)
2024–	Molde	35	(0)
2024–2025	Molde 2	3	(0)
2025–2026	→ Samsunspor (loan)	0	(0)
- * Club domestic league appearances and goals as of 08:09, 7 September 2026 (UTC)

Albert Posiadała (born 25 February 2003) is a Polish professional footballer who plays as a goalkeeper for Eliteserien club Molde.

== Career ==
On 1 February 2024, Norwegian Eliteserien club Molde announced the signing of Posiadała from Radomiak Radom, to a four-year contract.

On 15 August 2025, Posiadała was sent on a five-month loan to Turkish side Samsunspor.

== Career statistics ==
As of match played 6 September 2026

Appearances and goals by club, season and competition
Club	Season	League			National cup (Note: Includes Norwegian Cup, Turkish Cup)		Europe		Total	
Club	Season	Division	Apps	Goals	Apps	Goals	Apps	Goals	Apps	Goals
Pogoń Siedlce	2020–21	II liga	2	0	0	0	—		2	0
Świt NDM	2021–22	III liga, gr. I	25	0	0	0	—		25	0
Radomiak Radom	2022–23	Ekstraklasa	1	0	0	0	—		1	0
Radomiak Radom	2023–24	Ekstraklasa	15	0	0	0	—		15	0
Radomiak Radom	Total		16	0	0	0	0	0	16	0
Wisła Puławy (loan)	2022–23	II liga	9	0	0	0	—		9	0
Molde	2024	Eliteserien	20	0	4	0	11 (Note: Five appearances in UEFA Europa League, six appearances in UEFA Conference League)	0	35	0
Molde	2026	Eliteserien	15	0	0	0	—		15	0
Molde	Total		35	0	4	0	11	0	50	0
Samsunspor (loan)	2025–26	Süper Lig	0	0	2	0	0	0	2	0
Career total			87	0	6	0	11	0	104	0
