= Andreas Myklebust =

Norwegian footballer (born 2005)

Personal information
- Full name: Andreas Eikrem Myklebust
- Date of birth: 16 July 2005 (age 21)
- Place of birth: Indonesia
- Height: 1.88 m (6 ft 2 in)
- Position: Midfielder

Team information
- Current team: Brattvåg
- Number: 15

Youth career
- –2023: Molde

Senior career*
Years	Team	Apps	(Gls)
2022–2025	Molde 2	25	(4)
2023–2025	Molde	2	(0)
2024	→ Kvik Halden (loan)	23	(3)
2025	→ Træff (loan)	25	(1)
2026–	Brattvåg	22	(2)

International career^{‡}
2021	Norway U16	8	(0)
2022	Norway U17	5	(0)
2023–	Norway U18	7	(0)
- * Club domestic league appearances and goals as of 15 November 2026 ‡ National team caps and goals as of 8 January 2024

Andreas Eikrem Myklebust (born 16 July 2005) is a Norwegian footballer who plays as a midfielder for Brattvåg.

== Personal life ==
He is the older brother of fellow footballer Mads Myklebust, a goalkeeper born in 2007.

== Career statistics ==
=== Club ===
As of match played 23 July 2026.

Club	Season	League			Cup		Continental		Other		Total	
Club	Season	Division	Apps	Goals	Apps	Goals	Apps	Goals	Apps	Goals	Apps	Goals
Molde	2022	Eliteserien	0	0	1	0	0 (Note: Appearances in the UEFA Europa Conference League)	0	-		1	0
Molde	2023	Eliteserien	2	0	1	0	0 (Note: Appearances in the UEFA Champions League and UEFA Europa League)	0	-		3	0
Molde	2024	Eliteserien	0	0	0	0	0 (Note: Appearances in the UEFA Europa League)	0	-		0	0
Molde	Total		2	0	2	0	0	0	-	-	4	0
Kvik Halden (loan)	2024	Norwegian Second Division	23	3	1	0	-		-		24	3
Træff (loan)	2025	Norwegian Second Division	25	1	3	0	-		-		28	1
Brattvåg	2026	Norwegian Second Division	10	1	0	0	-		-		10	1
Career total			60	5	6	0	0	0	-	-	66	6
