= Frederik Ihler =

Danish footballer (born 2003)

Personal information
- Full name: Frederik Dahl Ihler
- Date of birth: 25 June 2003 (age 23)
- Place of birth: Aarhus, Denmark
- Height: 1.78 m (5 ft 10 in)
- Position: Forward

Team information
- Current team: Volendam
- Number: 67

Youth career
- –2017: VSK Aarhus
- 2017–2020: AGF

Senior career*
Years	Team	Apps	(Gls)
2020–2023	AGF	8	(1)
2022	→ Valur (loan)	3	(0)
2022–2023	→ Skive (loan)	25	(10)
2023–2024	Landskrona BoIS	30	(10)
2024–2025	Molde	11	(2)
2025	→ IF Elfsborg (loan)	14	(7)
2025–	IF Elfsborg	28	(2)
2026–	→ Volendam (loan)	5	(1)

International career^{‡}
2019	Denmark U16	2	(0)
2019–2020	Denmark U17	4	(0)
2022	Denmark U19	1	(0)
- * Club domestic league appearances and goals as of 3 October 2026 ‡ National team caps and goals as of 22 February 2022

Frederik Dahl Ihler (born 25 June 2003) is a Danish footballer who plays as a forward for Dutch Eerste Divisie club Volendam on loan from Swedish club IF Elfsborg.

== Club career ==
On 5 August 2024, Ihler signed a four-and-a-half-year contract for Molde FK.

On 26 March 2025, Ihler was loaned out to Swedish side IF Elfsborg on a deal for the 2025-season. On 11 July 2025, the deal was made permanent, which made Ihler sign a contract until the end of 2029.

On 1 September 2026, Ihler was loaned by Volendam in the Netherlands, with an option to buy.

== Personal life ==
Ihler is Christian and prays when waking up and before playing a match.

== Career statistics ==
=== Club ===
As of match played 25 July 2022

Club	Season	League			Cup		Continental		Other		Total	
Club	Season	Division	Apps	Goals	Apps	Goals	Apps	Goals	Apps	Goals	Apps	Goals
AGF	2019–20	Danish Superliga	1	0	0	0	–		0	0	1	0
AGF	2020–21	Danish Superliga	0	0	0	0	–		0	0	0	0
AGF	2021–22	Danish Superliga	7	1	0	0	–		0	0	7	1
Career total			8	1	0	0	0	0	0	0	8	1
