= Peter Mörk =

Swedish footballer

Personal information
- Full name: Jan Tomas Peter Mörk
- Date of birth: 27 January 1969 (age 57)
- Position: Midfielder

Youth career
- 1979–1987: Djurgården

Senior career*
Years	Team	Apps	(Gls)
1986–1990	Djurgården	48	(7)
1991–1995	Vasalund		
1996–1998	Bryne		
- Sola
- Sandnes Ulf
- Stavanger
- Voll
- Rosseland

International career
1985	Sweden U16	2	(0)
1986	Sweden U18	4	(0)
1989	Sweden U21	2	(0)
- * Club domestic league appearances and goals

Jan Tomas Peter Mörk (born 27 January 1969) is a Swedish former footballer who played as a midfielder for Djurgården, Vasalund and Norwegian clubs.

== Club career ==
Mörk joined Djurgården's youth teams in 1979. In 1984, he was selected for the Stockholms Fotbollförbund team at the Swedish youth camp in Sannarp.

In 1986, at the age of seventeen, he debuted in the senior team in the 1986 Allsvenskan against AIK. The year after, in 1987, he was awarded Djurgården Youth Player of the Year. Mörk made 26 Allsvenskan appearances for Djurgården and scored six goals. In total, he played 48 league matches for the team in Allsvenskan and Division 1 and scored seven goals.

After five seasons in Djurgården without really establishing himself in the starting eleven, Mörk switched to Vasalund. As an starting midfielder, He contributed to the team reaching the 1991 play-offs to Allsvenskan. With Mörk as a captain for Vasalund, the team again reached the 1993 play-offs to Allsvenskan.

After six years in Vasalund, Mörk moved to Norwegian Bryne FK in 1996 and stayed there until 1998. Mörk then continued his endeavours in Norwegian clubs Sola, Sandnes Ulf, Stavanger, Voll, and Rosseland.

== International career ==
Mörk made eight appearances for the Sweden youth teams, two for the U16 team, four for the U18 team and two for the U21 team.
