= Kristoffer Haugen =

Norwegian footballer (born 1994)

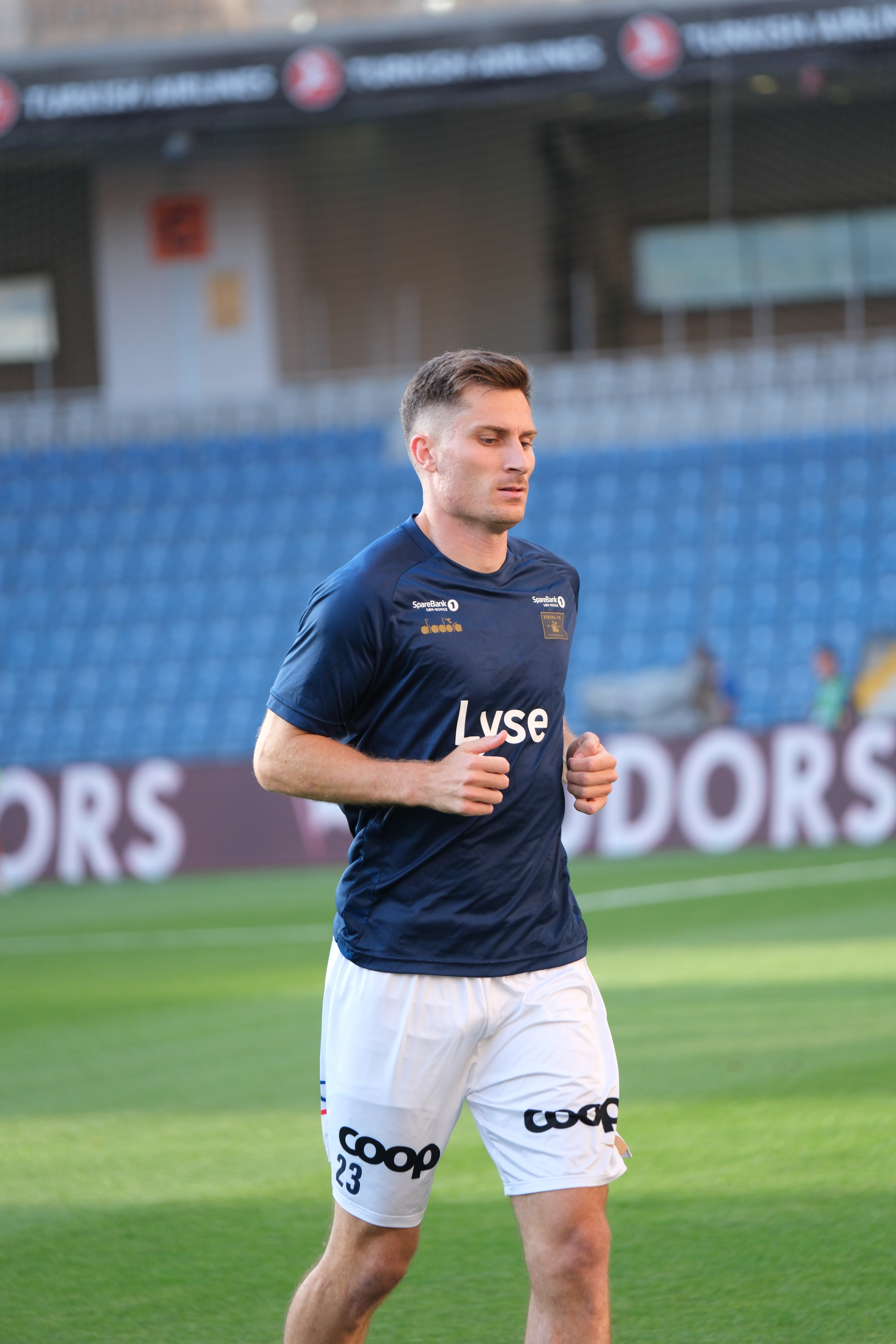
- Haugen with Viking in 2025

Personal information
- Date of birth: 21 February 1994 (age 32)
- Place of birth: Verdalen, Norway
- Height: 1.88 m (6 ft 2 in)
- Position: Left-back

Team information
- Current team: Viking
- Number: 28

Youth career
- –2006: Voll
- 2007–2012: Viking

Senior career*
| Years | Team | Apps | (Gls) |
| 2012–2018 | Viking | 107 | (5) |
| 2018–2025 | Molde | 153 | (18) |
| 2025– | Viking | 29 | (2) |

International career^{‡}
| 2011 | Norway U17 | 8 | (0) |
| 2012 | Norway U18 | 11 | (0) |
| 2013 | Norway U19 | 4 | (0) |
| 2015 | Norway U21 | 2 | (0) |
- * Club domestic league appearances and goals as of 19 August 2026 ‡ National team caps and goals as of 31 March 2015

Kristoffer Haugen (born 21 February 1994) is a Norwegian professional footballer who plays as a left-back for Eliteserien club Viking.

== Early life ==
Haugen hails from Verdalen. He started his career in Voll IL, but joined the youth ranks of Viking in 2007. It was a successful youth team, which won the national boys-16 football cup in 2009.

== Club career ==
=== Viking ===
Haugen made his senior team debut in the 2012 La Manga Cup against FK Ekranas in February 2012, scoring his first first-team goal in the first round of the 2013 Norwegian Football Cup. He made his league debut when he started, and played 90 minutes, in the two last fixtures of the 2013 Tippeligaen.

=== Molde ===
On 10 January 2018, Haugen signed a three-year contract with Molde FK. He made his debut for the club in the 5–0 home win against Sandefjord on 11 March 2018.

On 15 June 2020, Haugen signed a new contract with Molde, until the end of the 2022 season.

=== Viking ===
On 12 July 2025, Haugen rejoined Viking on a two-and-a-half-year contract. He made 15 appearances and scored one goal as Viking won the 2025 Eliteserien.

== International career ==
Haugen played a total of 25 games for Norway at international youth level.

== Career statistics ==
=== Club ===
As of match played 18 August 2026

Appearances and goals by club, season and competition
| Club | Season | League | | | National cup | | Europe | | Total | |
| Club | Season | Division | Apps | Goals | Apps | Goals | Apps | Goals | Apps | Goals |
|---|---|---|---|---|---|---|---|---|---|---|
| Viking | 2012 | Tippeligaen | 0 | 0 | 2 | 0 | — | | 2 | 0 |
| Viking | 2013 | Tippeligaen | 2 | 0 | 2 | 1 | — | | 4 | 1 |
| Viking | 2014 | Tippeligaen | 22 | 1 | 4 | 0 | — | | 26 | 1 |
| Viking | 2015 | Tippeligaen | 30 | 1 | 6 | 1 | — | | 36 | 2 |
| Viking | 2016 | Tippeligaen | 26 | 0 | 3 | 0 | — | | 29 | 0 |
| Viking | 2017 | Eliteserien | 27 | 3 | 2 | 0 | — | | 29 | 3 |
| Viking | Total | | 107 | 5 | 19 | 2 | — | | 126 | 7 |
| Molde | 2018 | Eliteserien | 26 | 2 | 0 | 0 | 8 (Note: Appearances in UEFA Europa League) | 0 | 34 | 2 |
| Molde | 2019 | Eliteserien | 20 | 0 | 0 | 0 | 7 | 0 | 27 | 0 |
| Molde | 2020 | Eliteserien | 15 | 1 | — | | 8 (Note: Five appearances in UEFA Champions League, and three appearances in UEFA Europa League) | 0 | 23 | 1 |
| Molde | 2021 | Eliteserien | 25 | 6 | 1 | 0 | 6 (Note: Four appearances in UEFA Europa League, and two appearances in UEFA Conference League) | 0 | 32 | 6 |
| Molde | 2022 | Eliteserien | 19 | 3 | 5 | 1 | 6 (Note: Appearances in UEFA Conference League) | 1 | 30 | 5 |
| Molde | 2023 | Eliteserien | 19 | 4 | 5 | 1 | 12 (Note: Six appearances in UEFA Champions League, and six appearances in UEFA Europa League) | 1 | 36 | 6 |
| Molde | 2024 | Eliteserien | 18 | 2 | 3 | 1 | 7 | 0 | 28 | 3 |
| Molde | 2025 | Eliteserien | 11 | 0 | 3 | 1 | 0 | 0 | 14 | 1 |
| Molde | Total | | 153 | 18 | 17 | 4 | 54 | 2 | 224 | 24 |
| Viking | 2025 | Eliteserien | 15 | 1 | 0 | 0 | 2 | 0 | 17 | 1 |
| Viking | 2026 | Eliteserien | 14 | 1 | 0 | 0 | 1 (Note: One appearances in UEFA Champions League) | 0 | 15 | 1 |
| Viking | Total | | 29 | 2 | 0 | 0 | 3 | 0 | 32 | 2 |
| Career total | | | 289 | 25 | 36 | 6 | 57 | 2 | 382 | 33 |

== Honours ==
Molde

- Eliteserien: 2019, 2022
- Norwegian Cup: 2021–22, 2023

Viking

- Eliteserien: 2025
