= 2020 Molde FK season =

Molde
2020 season
- Chairman: Odd Ivar Moen
- Manager: Erling Moe
- Stadium: Aker Stadion
- Eliteserien: 2nd
- Norwegian Cup: Canceled due to the COVID-19 pandemic
- Champions League: Play-off round vs Ferencváros
- Europa League: Round of 32 in 2021 season
- Top goalscorer: League: Leke James (13); All: Ohi Omoijuanfo (16)
- Highest home attendance: 600 vs. Bodø/Glimt (17 October 2020) vs. Strømsgodset (25 October 2020) vs. Kristiansund (8 November 2020) vs. Haugesund (29 November 2020) vs. Aalesund (6 December 2020) vs. Sarpsborg 08 (19 December 2020)
- Lowest home attendance: 0 vs. KuPS (19 August 2020) vs. Ferencváros (23 September 2020)
- Average home league attendance: 360 (19 December 2020)
Home colours	Away colours	Third colours

The 2020 season was Molde's 13th consecutive year in Eliteserien, and their 44th season in the top flight of Norwegian football. They finished second in the Eliteserien, whilst the Norwegian Cup and Mesterfinalen where cancelled due to the COVID-19 pandemic in Norway. In Europe, Molde were knocked out of the 2020–21 UEFA Champions League by Ferencváros dropping into the Europa League where they progressed to the Round of 32 which will take place in the 2021 season.

== Season events ==
On 3 January, Tobias Hestad extended his contract with Molde until the end of 2022.

On 31 January, Molde announced that Etzaz Hussain had signed a new contract with the club, until the end of the 2022 season.

On 11 February, Molde announced the signing of Marcus Holmgren Pedersen on a three-year contract from Tromsø.

On 9 March, Molde cancelled their planned training camp in Marbella, Spain due to the COVID-19 pandemic.

The season was scheduled to begin on 4 April, but due to the COVID-19 pandemic in Norway the opening games of the season were delayed, first till 2 May, then further delayed till 23 May.

On 4 May, Molde announced the singing of Ola Brynhildsen from Stabæk on a 2 ½ year agreement commencing on 1 July.

On 7 May, the Norwegian government allowed the league to start on 16 June with full training starting immediately.

On 20 May, Ola Brynhildsen's transfer from Stabæk to Molde was concluded.

On 28 May, Molde announced that Vegard Forren would leave the club by mutual agreement on 31 May, after Forren used money gathered from players fines to cover gambling debts.

On 12 June, the Norwegian Football Federation announced that a maximum of 200 home fans would be allowed to attend the upcoming seasons matches.

On 15 June, Molde announced that Kristoffer Haugen had signed a new contract, until the end of the 2022 season.

On 17 June, Molde announced the singing of Albert Braut Tjåland from Bryne and Anton Solbakken from Viking, with the deals becoming official on 1 July.

On 27 June, Molde announced that Erling Moe had signed a new two-year contract with the club, keeping him as manager until the end of the 2022 season.

On 30 June, Molde announced the signing of Sheriff Sinyan on a three-year contract from Lillestrøm.

On 10 September, the Norwegian Football Federation cancelled the 2020 Norwegian Cup due to the COVID-19 pandemic in Norway.

On 30 September, the Minister of Culture and Gender Equality, Abid Raja, announced that clubs would be able to have crowds of 600 at games from 12 October.

On 6 October, Molde announced the signing of Birk Risa from Odd on a contract until 2023, with John Kitolano moving in the opposite direction on loan from his parent club Wolverhampton Wanderers.

== Squad ==
As of match played 19 December 2020

No.	Name	Nationality	Position	Date of birth (age)	Signed from	Signed in	Contract ends	Apps.	Goals
Goalkeepers
1	Andreas Linde	(Sweden)	GK	24 July 1993 (aged 27)	Helsingborg	2015	2021	143	0
12	Álex Craninx	(Belgium)	GK	21 October 1995 (aged 25)	Cartagena	2018	2023	28	0
52	Oliver Petersen	(Norway)	GK	26 September 2001 (aged 19)	Academy	2019		1	0
Defenders
2	Martin Bjørnbak	(Norway)	DF	22 March 1992 (aged 28)	Bodø/Glimt	2019	2022	56	0
3	Birk Risa	(Norway)	DF	13 February 1998 (aged 22)	Odd	2020	2023	10	0
5	Sheriff Sinyan	(The Gambia)	DF	19 July 1996 (aged 24)	Lillestrøm	2020	2023	25	0
6	Stian Gregersen	(Norway)	DF	17 May 1995 (aged 25)	Academy	2013	2020	77	3
18	Kristoffer Haraldseid	(Norway)	DF	17 January 1994 (aged 26)	Haugesund	2019	2022	36	1
27	Marcus Pedersen	(Norway)	DF	16 July 2000 (aged 20)	Tromsø	2020	2022	27	3
28	Kristoffer Haugen	(Norway)	DF	21 February 1994 (aged 26)	Viking	2018	2022	84	3
Midfielders
7	Magnus Wolff Eikrem	(Norway)	MF	8 August 1990 (aged 30)	Seattle Sounders FC	2018	2022	177	40
8	Fredrik Sjølstad	(Norway)	MF	29 March 1994 (aged 26)	Kongsvinger	2019	2021	27	1
9	Mattias Moström	(Sweden)	MF	25 February 1983 (aged 37)	AIK	2007	2020	368	37
11	Martin Ellingsen	(Norway)	MF	2 May 1995 (aged 25)	Kongsvinger	2017	2022	83	14
15	Tobias Christensen	(Norway)	MF	11 May 2000 (aged 20)	Start	2019	2022	30	2
16	Etzaz Hussain	(Norway)	MF	27 January 1993 (aged 27)	Rudeš	2017	2022	233	31
17	Fredrik Aursnes	(Norway)	MF	10 December 1995 (aged 25)	Hødd	2016	2021	171	19
19	Eirik Hestad	(Norway)	MF	26 June 1995 (aged 25)	Academy	2012	2021	202	32
20	Henry Wingo	(United States)	MF	4 October 1995 (aged 25)	Seattle Sounders FC	2019	2021	30	2
22	Ola Brynhildsen	(Norway)	MF	27 April 1999 (aged 21)	Stabæk	2020	2022	39	5
23	Eirik Andersen	(Norway)	MF	21 September 1992 (aged 28)	Strømsgodset	2019	2022	23	8
30	Mathis Bolly	(Ivory Coast)	MF	14 November 1990 (aged 30)	Free agent	2019	2022	40	6
Forwards
10	Leke James	(Nigeria)	FW	1 November 1992 (aged 28)	Free agent	2018	2020	83	43
14	Erling Knudtzon	(Norway)	FW	15 December 1988 (aged 32)	Lillestrøm	2019	2021	66	7
37	Ole Sebastian Sundgot	(Norway)	FW	12 January 2001 (aged 19)	Academy	2020		1	0
99	Ohi Omoijuanfo	(Norway)	FW	10 January 1994 (aged 26)	Stabæk	2019	2021	73	32
Out on loan
26	Mathias Ranmark	(Norway)	GK	16 October 1995 (aged 25)	Oppsal	2017	2021	3	0
45	Emil Breivik	(Norway)	DF	11 June 2000 (aged 20)	Academy		2022	3	0
46	Tobias Hestad	(Norway)	MF	29 December 2000 (aged 19)	Academy		2022	1	0
50	Jakob Ørsahl	(Norway)	MF	14 July 2001 (aged 19)	Academy			1	2
Players who left club during season
3	Martin Ove Roseth	(Norway)	DF	10 July 1998 (aged 22)	Academy	2016	2021	3	0
5	Vegard Forren	(Norway)	DF	16 February 1988 (aged 32)	Brighton & Hove Albion	2017	2021	384	18
25	John Kitolano	(Norway)	DF	18 October 1999 (aged 21)	loan from Wolverhampton Wanderers	2020	2021	10	1
21	Tobias Svendsen	(Norway)	MF	31 August 1999 (aged 21)	Academy	2015	2020	23	1
44	Simen Bakkemyr Hagbø	(Norway)	DF	3 May 1999 (aged 21)	Academy	2018		1	0

== Transfers ==
=== In ===
Date	Position	Nationality	Name	From	Fee	Ref.
11 February 2020	DF	(Norway)	Marcus Holmgren Pedersen	Tromsø	Undisclosed	
20 May 2020	MF	(Norway)	Ola Brynhildsen	Stabæk	Undisclosed	
30 June 2020	DF	(The Gambia)	Sheriff Sinyan	Lillestrøm	Undisclosed	
1 July 2020	MF	(Norway)	Anton Solbakken	Viking	Undisclosed	
1 July 2020	FW	(Norway)	Albert Braut Tjåland	Bryne	Undisclosed	
6 October 2020	DF	(Norway)	Birk Risa	Odd	Undisclosed	

=== Loans in ===
Date from	Position	Nationality	Name	From	Date to	Ref.
20 January 2020	DF	(Norway)	John Kitolano	Wolverhampton Wanderers	6 October 2020	

=== Out ===
Date	Position	Nationality	Name	To	Fee	Ref.
21 February 2020	FW	(Nigeria)	Daniel Chima Chukwu	Taizhou Yuanda	Undisclosed	
31 March 2020	DF	(Norway)	Simen Bakkemyr Hagbø	Levanger	Undisclosed	
26 June 2020	MF	(Norway)	Tobias Svendsen	HamKam	Undisclosed	
29 June 2020	DF	(Norway)	Martin Ove Roseth	Sogndal	Undisclosed	

=== Loans out ===
Date from	Position	Nationality	Name	To	Date to	Ref.
30 January 2020	MF	(Norway)	Emil Breivik	Raufoss	End of 2020 season	
30 January 2020	MF	(Norway)	Tobias Hestad	Stjørdals-Blink	End of 2020 season	
6 February 2020	GK	(Norway)	Mathias Ranmark	HamKam	End of 2020 season	

=== Released ===
Date	Position	Nationality	Name	Joined	Date	Ref.
31 December 2019	DF	(Norway)	Ruben Gabrielsen	Toulouse	1 January 2020	
31 December 2019	FW	(Norway)	Sivert Gussiås	Sandefjord	8 January 2020	
31 May 2020	DF	(Norway)	Vegard Forren	Brann	9 June 2020	
31 December 2020	MF	(Sweden)	Mattias Moström	Retired		
31 December 2020	FW	(Nigeria)	Leke James	Al Qadsiah	27 January 2021	

== Friendlies ==
1 February 2020	Molde	3–1	Hødd	Molde
14:00 CET (UTC+1)	James 13'; Eikrem 45'; M. Løvik 68'	Report	Shroot 20'	Stadium: Aker Stadion

8 February 2020	Kristiansund	1–1	Molde	Kristiansund
14:00 CET (UTC+1)	Coly 5'	Report	Ellingsen 90+1'	Stadium: Kristiansund Stadion

12 February 2020	Molde	4–0	Kongsvinger	Marbella, Spain
16:00 CET (UTC+1)	Moström 59', 89'; Aursnes 76'; Hussain 84'	Report		Stadium: Marbella Football Center

16 February 2020	Molde (Norway)	1–0	(Russia) Krasnodar	Marbella, Spain
16:00 CET (UTC+1)	Knudtzon 48'	Report		Stadium: Estadio Municipal de Marbella

19 February 2020	Molde (Norway)	1–0	(Russia) Rostov	Marbella, Spain
16:00 CET (UTC+1)	Moström 3'	Report

28 February 2020	Molde	5–2	Aalesund	Molde
17:00 CET (UTC+1)	Ellingsen 9'; Knudtzon 30'; Eikrem 45'; James 60'; Moström 78'	Report	Fet 43'; Nordli 68'	Stadium: Aker Stadion

6 March 2020	Molde	2–0	Lillestrøm	Molde
15:00 CET (UTC+1)	Christensen 49'; James 51' (pen.)			Stadium: Aker Stadion

12 March 2020	Molde	Cancelled	Haugesund	Marbella, Spain
CET (UTC+1)
Note: Cancelled due to the COVID-19 pandemic

14 March 2020	Molde	Cancelled	Sandefjord	Molde
13:00 CET (UTC+1)				Stadium: Aker Stadion
Note: Cancelled due to the COVID-19 pandemic

24 March 2020	Molde	Cancelled	Brattvåg	Molde
CET (UTC+1)				Stadium: Aker Stadion
Note: Cancelled due to the COVID-19 pandemic

29 March 2020	Molde (Norway)	Cancelled	(Sweden) Malmö	Molde
14:00 CET (UTC+1)				Stadium: Aker Stadion
Note: Cancelled due to the COVID-19 pandemic

31 May 2020	Molde	1–2	Sogndal	Molde
12:00 CEST (UTC+2)	James 68'	Report	Hoven 42'; Steiring 80'	Stadium: Aker Stadion; Attendance: 0
Note: Match played behind closed doors due to the COVID-19 pandemic.

4 June 2020	Molde	4–2	Kristiansund	Molde
13:00 CEST (UTC+2)	Christensen 48', 86'; Andersen 58'; Pedersen 67'	Report	Bye 45'	Stadium: Aker Stadion; Attendance: 0
Note: Match played behind closed doors due to the COVID-19 pandemic.

8 June 2020	Molde	3–2	Brann	Molde
12:00 CEST (UTC+2)	Eikrem 3'; Brynhildsen 80'; Haraldseid 87'	Report	Taylor 11'; Koomson 58'	Stadium: Aker Stadion; Attendance: 0
Note: Match played behind closed doors due to the COVID-19 pandemic.

== Competitions ==
=== Eliteserien ===
==== Results summary ====
Overall								Home						Away					
Pld	W	D	L	GF	GA	GD	Pts	W	D	L	GF	GA	GD	W	D	L	GF	GA	GD
30	20	2	8	77	36	+41	62	12	1	2	42	13	+29	8	1	6	35	23	+12

Last updated: 19 December 2020.
Source: see below

==== Results by match ====
Match	1	2	3	4	5	6	7	8	9	10	11	12	13	14	15	16	17	18	19	20	21	22	23	24	25	26	27	28	29	30
Ground	A	H	A	H	A	H	A	H	A	A	H	A	H	H	A	H	A	A	H	A	H	H	A	H	A	H	H	A	A	H
Result	W	W	W	W	D	W	W	W	W	L	W	L	W	L	L	W	L	L	L	W	W	W	W	D	W	W	W	L	W	W
Position	1	3	2	2	2	2	2	2	2	2	2	2	2	2	2	2	2	2	4	3	2	2	2	2	2	2	2	2	2	2

Updated to match(es) played on 19 December 2020. Source: see below
A = Away; H = Home; W = Win; D = Draw; L = Loss

==== Results ====
16 June 2020 1	Aalesund	1–4	Molde	Ålesund
18:00 CEST (UTC+2)	Castro (penalty missed) 25'; Nordli 29'	Report	Eikrem 10'; James (yellow card) 24' (yellow-red card) 70' (goal) 54'; Hussain 45+1'; Hestad 86'; Wingo (yellow card) 90+3'	Stadium: Color Line Stadion; Attendance: 200; Referee: Tommy Skjerven

20 June 2020 2	Molde	1–0	Rosenborg	Molde
20:30 CEST (UTC+2)	Omoijuanfo 47'; Haugen (yellow card) 89'	Report	Zachariassen (yellow card) 41'; Trondsen (yellow card) 60'	Stadium: Aker Stadion; Attendance: 200; Referee: Svein Oddvar Moen

25 June 2020 3	Start	2–3	Molde	Kristiansand
18:00 CEST (UTC+2)	Ugland 18'; Skaanes (yellow card) 43'; Skålevik (yellow card) 67'; Markovic (yellow card) 73'; Bringaker 75'	Report	Pedersen 29'; Hussain (yellow card) 34'; Haugen 45'; Hestad (yellow card) 87'; Christensen 90+4'; Gregersen 90+6'	Stadium: Sør Arena; Attendance: 200; Referee: Tore Hansen

28 June 2020 4	Molde	4–1	Stabæk	Molde
18:00 CEST (UTC+2)	Eikrem 20' (yellow card) 42'; Aursnes (yellow card) 40'; Knudtzon 55'; James 59'; Kitolano (yellow card) 70'; Ellingsen (yellow card) 75'; Hussain (yellow card) 90+2'; Omoijuanfo 90+4' (pen.)	Report	Vetlesen 61' (yellow card) 70'; Hanche-Olsen (yellow card) 90+1'; Edvardsen (yellow card) 90+4'	Stadium: Aker Stadion; Attendance: 200; Referee: Rohit Saggi

2 July 2020 5	Kristiansund	2–2	Molde	Kristiansund
18:00 CEST (UTC+2)	P.E.Ulvestad (yellow card) 32'; Pellegrino 52'; Hopmark 90+5' (pen.)	Report	Hussain (yellow card) 31' (goal) 64'; P.E.Ulvestad 73' (o.g.)	Stadium: Kristiansund Stadion; Attendance: 200; Referee: Tommy Skjerven

5 July 2020 6	Molde	2–1	Mjøndalen	Molde
18:00 CEST (UTC+2)	Aursnes 30'; Kitolano 32'; Bjørnbak (yellow card) 68'; Pedersen (yellow card) 86'	Report	Jansen 61'; Thórhallsson (yellow card) 70'; Gauseth (penalty missed) 86'; Dragsnes (yellow card) 87'	Stadium: Aker Stadion; Attendance: 200; Referee: Sigurd Smehus Kringstad

11 July 2020 7	Haugesund	0–3	Molde	Haugesund
18:00 CEST (UTC+2)	Hansen (yellow card) 66'	Report	Andersen 18'; Hussain 29'; Brynhildsen (yellow card) 49'; Aursnes (yellow card) 76'; James 78'	Stadium: Haugesund Stadion; Attendance: 200; Referee: Espen Eskås

15 July 2020 8	Molde	5–0	Viking	Molde
18:00 CEST (UTC+2)	James 5' (pen.), 64'; Hussain 13'; Wingo 76'; Andersen 81'	Report	Vevatne (yellow card) 42'; Høiland (penalty missed) 83'	Stadium: Aker Stadion; Attendance: 200; Referee: Tom Harald Hagen

19 July 2020 9	Strømsgodset	0–4	Molde	Drammen
18:00 CEST (UTC+2)	Salvesen (yellow card) 89'	Report	Hestad 44' (yellow card) 71'; Hussain 58'; James 60'; Eikrem (yellow card) 75'; Knudtzon 80'	Stadium: Marienlyst Stadion; Attendance: 200; Referee: Ola Hobber Nilsen

26 July 2020 10	Bodø/Glimt	3–1	Molde	Bodø
18:00 CEST (UTC+2)	Berg 25'; Lode (yellow card) 52'; Junker 65'; J.Hauge 71'	Report	Omoijuanfo 9'; Bjørnbak (yellow card) 24'	Stadium: Aspmyra Stadion; Attendance: 200; Referee: Tore Hansen

29 July 2020 11	Molde	4–1	Vålerenga	Molde
20:30 CEST (UTC+2)	Aursnes 28'; Bjørnbak (yellow card) 45'; Christensen 56' (yellow card) 58'; Omoijuanfo 78'; Hussain 90+1'	Report	Holm (yellow card) 7'; Finne 86'	Stadium: Aker Stadion; Attendance: 200; Referee: Kristoffer Hagenes

1 August 2020 12	Sandefjord	2–1	Molde	Sandefjord
18:00 CEST (UTC+2)	Rufo 18'; Pálsson (yellow card) 27'; Vales (yellow card) 57' (goal) 90+2' (pen.); Brenden (yellow card) 74'; Grorud (yellow card) 85'	Report	Brynhildsen 14'; Sjølstad (yellow card) 29' (yellow-red card) 41'; Sinyan (yellow card) 67'; James (yellow card) 68'	Stadium: Sandefjord Arena; Attendance: 200; Referee: Mohammad Aslam

5 August 2020 17	Molde	5–0	Start	Molde
19:00 CEST (UTC+2)	Omoijuanfo 8' (pen.), 59' (pen.); Christensen (yellow card) 54'; Brynhildsen 68', 74'; Eikrem 86'	Report	Skaanes (yellow card) 80'	Stadium: Aker Stadion; Attendance: 200; Referee: Sivert Amland

10 August 2020 13	Molde	1–2	Brann	Molde
20:30 CEST (UTC+2)	Brynhildsen 17'; Eikrem (yellow card) 77'	Report	Pedersen 12'; Forren (yellow card) 29'; Bamba (yellow card) 34'; Tveita 54'	Stadium: Aker Stadion; Attendance: 200; Referee: Espen Eskås

15 August 2020 14	Sarpsborg 08	2–1	Molde	Sarpsborg
16:00 CEST (UTC+2)	Abdellaoue 31' (pen.); J.Larsen (yellow card) 44'; Halvorsen 56'	Report	Hussain (yellow card) 31'; Aursnes (yellow card) 32'; Andersen 59'	Stadium: Sarpsborg Stadion; Attendance: 200; Referee: Ola Hobber Nilsen

22 August 2020 15	Molde	2–0	Odd	Molde
15:00 CEST (UTC+2)	Eikrem (yellow card) 61'; James 77' (pen.) (yellow card) 77'; Pedersen 90+4'	Report	Rashani (yellow card) 39'	Stadium: Aker Stadion; Attendance: 200; Referee: Sivert Amland

30 August 2020 16	Viking	3–2	Molde	Stavanger
20:30 CEST (UTC+2)	Berisha 58'; Ibrahimaj 72'; Torsteinbø 75'	Report	Andersen 67'; James (penalty missed) 90+1; Ellingsen 90+3'	Stadium: Viking Stadion; Attendance: 200; Referee: Rohit Saggi

19 September 2020 18	Vålerenga	2–1	Molde	Oslo
18:00 CEST (UTC+2)	Kjartansson 21' (penalty missed) 47'; Borchgrevink (yellow card) 58'; Dønnum 83'	Report	Andersen (yellow card) 23'; Kitolano (red card) 47'; Wingo 90+5'	Stadium: Intility Arena; Attendance: 200; Referee: Kai Erik Steen

26 September 2020 19	Molde	0–1	Sandefjord	Molde
18:00 CEST (UTC+2)	Haugen (yellow card) 24'; Brynhildsen (yellow card) 29'; Ellingsen (yellow card) 34'; Sinyan (yellow card) 66'; Hestad (yellow card) 89'	Report	Vales 6' (yellow card) 59'; Vallès (yellow card) 84'	Stadium: Aker Stadion; Attendance: 200; Referee: Rohit Saggi

4 October 2020 20	Brann	1–2	Molde	Bergen
18:00 CEST (UTC+2)	Bamba 14'	Report	Hestad 13'; Bolly (yellow card) 82'; Kristiansen 85' (o.g.)	Stadium: Brann Stadion; Attendance: 200; Referee: Ola Hobber Nilsen

17 October 2020 21	Molde	4–2	Bodø/Glimt	Molde
20:30 CEST (UTC+2)	Eikrem 32', 52'; Aursnes (yellow card) 41'; Omoijuanfo 44'; Hestad 47' (yellow card) 58'; Pedersen (yellow card) 49'; Gregersen (yellow card) 86'	Report	Tounekti 30'; Saltnes (yellow card) 51'; Moberg 62' (yellow card) 73'; Junker (yellow card) 90+3'	Stadium: Aker Stadion; Attendance: 600; Referee: Kai Erik Steen

25 October 2020 22	Molde	2–1	Strømsgodset	Molde
18:00 CET (UTC+1)	Ellingsen 70'; James 82'	Report	Ingimundarson 86'	Stadium: Aker Stadion; Attendance: 600; Referee: Sivert Amland

1 November 2020 23	Mjøndalen	1–3	Molde	Mjøndalen
15:00 CET (UTC+1)	Brustad (yellow card) 26' (goal) 38'; Ovenstad (yellow card) 71'	Report	Gregersen (yellow card) 52'; Omoijuanfo (yellow card) 60'; James (yellow card) 67' (goal) 80' (pen.); Ellingsen 76', 87'	Stadium: Consto Arena; Attendance: 600; Referee: Espen Eskås

8 November 2020 24	Molde	2–2	Kristiansund	Molde
18:00 CET (UTC+1)	Hussain 12'; Bolly (yellow card) 83'; Aursnes 89'	Report	Pellegrino 14'; Moumbagna 23'	Stadium: Aker Stadion; Attendance: 600; Referee: Sigurd Smehus Kringstad

21 November 2020 25	Stabæk	0–3	Molde	Bærum
16:00 CET (UTC+1)		Report	James 45+1', 85'; Aursnes (yellow card) 60'; Gregersen 81'	Stadium: Nadderud Stadion; Attendance: 200; Referee: Tom Harald Hagen

29 November 2020 26	Molde	3–1	Haugesund	Molde
18:00 CET (UTC+1)	Hussain 7' (yellow card) 70'; Brynhildsen 12'; Ammitzbøll 48' (o.g.); Eikrem (yellow card) 69'; Knudtzon (yellow card) 89'	Report	Therkildsen 10'; Stølås (yellow card) 40'; Krygård (yellow card) 78'	Stadium: Aker Stadion; Attendance: 600; Referee: Espen Eskås

6 December 2020 28	Molde	2–1	Aalesund	Molde
19:00 CET (UTC+1)	Eikrem 31'; James 79'	Report	Haugen (yellow card) 12' (goal) 90+4' (pen.); Nenass (yellow card) 69'	Stadium: Aker Stadion; Attendance: 600; Referee: Tore Hansen

13 December 2020 27	Rosenborg	3–1	Molde	Trondheim
18:00 CET (UTC+1)	Zachariassen (yellow card) 6'; Islamović 8', 83' (pen.); Konate (yellow card) 39'; Reginiussen 49' (yellow card) 84'	Report	Sinyan (yellow card) 14'; Omoijuanfo 20'; Hussain (yellow card) 32'	Stadium: Lerkendal Stadion; Attendance: 600; Referee: Espen Eskås

16 December 2020 29	Odd	1–4	Molde	Skien
18:00 CET (UTC+1)	Bakenga 9'	Report	Wingo (yellow card) 28'; Gregersen (yellow card) 37'; Christensen (yellow card) 55'; Eikrem 71'; Omoijuanfo 78', 90+5' (pen.); Bolly 83'	Stadium: Skagerak Arena; Attendance: 350; Referee: Ola Hobber Nilsen

19 December 2020 30	Molde	5–0	Sarpsborg 08	Molde
15:30 CET (UTC+1)	James 25' (pen.); Moström 27'; Omoijuanfo 38', 56'; Ellingsen 88'	Report	Heintz (yellow card) 25'; Adéoti (yellow card) 90+1'	Stadium: Aker Stadion; Attendance: 600; Referee: Tore Hansen

==== Table ====
Pos	Team	Pld	W	D	L	GF	GA	GD	Pts	Qualification or relegation
1	Bodø/Glimt (C)	30	26	3	1	103	32	+71	81	Qualification for the Champions League first qualifying round
2	Molde	30	20	2	8	77	36	+41	62	Qualification for the Europa Conference League second qualifying round
3	Vålerenga	30	15	10	5	51	33	+18	55	Qualification for the Europa Conference League second qualifying round
4	Rosenborg	30	15	7	8	50	35	+15	52	Qualification for the Europa Conference League second qualifying round
5	Kristiansund	30	12	12	6	57	45	+12	48	

Source: Football Association of Norway (in Norwegian)
Rules for classification: 1) Points; 2) Goal difference; 3) Goals scored; 4) Head-to-head points; 5) Head-to-head goal difference; 6) Head-to-head away goals scored (only if between two teams); 7) Head-to-head goals scored; 8) Play-off (only used to decide champions or relegation).
(C) Champions

=== Norwegian Cup ===
2020 First round	–
CEST (UTC+2)
Note: Cup cancelled on 10 September due to the COVID-19 pandemic in Norway.

=== Champions League ===
==== Qualifying rounds ====
19 August 2020 First qualifying round	Molde (Norway)	5–0	(Finland) KuPS	Molde, Norway
18:00 CEST (UTC+2)	Hestad 26'; Eikram 37'; Ellingsen (yellow card) 46'; Omoijuanfo 65'; Pedersen 87'; Knudtzon 89'	Report		Stadium: Aker Stadion; Attendance: 0 Referee: Bryn Markham-Jones (Wales)
Note: Match played behind closed doors.

26 August 2020 Second qualifying round	NK Celje (Slovenia)	1–2	(Norway) Molde	Celje, Slovenia
18:00 CEST (UTC+2)	Lotrič (yellow card) 2' (goal) 38'; Marandici (yellow card) 87'	Report	Pedersen (yellow card) 23'; Hussain 57'; James 74'	Stadium: Stadion Z'dežele; Attendance: 0 Referee: Jochem Kamphuis (Netherlands)
Note: Match played behind closed doors.

16 September 2020 Third qualifying round	Qarabağ (Azerbaijan)	0–0 (a.e.t.) (5–6 p)	(Norway) Molde	Larnaca, Cyprus
19:00 CEST (UTC+2)	Medina (yellow card) 50'; Guerrier (yellow card) 67'; Andrade (yellow card) 86'	Report	Hussain (yellow card) 83' (penalty missed) 102'; Hestad (yellow card) 89'	Stadium: AEK Arena – Georgios Karapatakis; Attendance: 0 Referee: Srđan Jovanović (Serbia)
	Penalties
	Matić (penalty scored); Medvedev (penalty scored); Andrade (penalty scored); Medina (penalty scored); Mahammadaliyev (penalty scored); Huseynov (penalty missed)		(penalty scored) Omoijuanfo; (penalty scored) Aursnes; (penalty scored) Hestad; (penalty scored) Christensen; (penalty scored) Ellingsen; (penalty scored) Haugen
Note: Match played at the AEK Arena – Georgios Karapatakis in Larnaca, Cyprus, instead of Qarabağ's regular stadium Azersun Arena, Baku, due to travel restrictions related to the COVID-19 pandemic between Azerbaijan and Norway. Match played behind closed doors.

23 September 2020 Playoff round 1st leg	Molde (Norway)	3–3	(Hungary) Ferencváros	Molde, Norway
21:00 CEST (UTC+2)	Aursnes (yellow card) 9'; Knudtzon (yellow card) 43'; James 55'; Hussain (yellow card) 58'; Eikrem 65'; Ellingsen 83'; Gregersen (yellow card) 90+7'	Report	Boli 7'; Uzuni 52'; Kharatin 87' (pen.)	Stadium: Aker Stadion; Attendance: 0 Referee: Carlos del Cerro Grande (Spain)
Note: Match played behind closed doors.

29 September 2020 Playoff round 2nd leg	Ferencváros (Hungary)	0–0 (3–3(a) agg.)	(Norway) Molde	Budapest, Hungary
21:00 CEST (UTC+2)	Botka (yellow card) 42'	Report	Aursnes (yellow card) 26'; James (yellow card) 49'; Hestad (yellow card) 55'	Stadium: Groupama Arena; Attendance: 0 Referee: Björn Kuipers (Netherlands)
Note: Match played behind closed doors.

=== Europa League ===
==== Group stage ====
Pos	Team	Pld	W	D	L	GF	GA	GD	Pts	Qualification
1	(England) Arsenal	6	6	0	0	20	5	+15	18	Advance to knockout phase
2	(Norway) Molde	6	3	1	2	9	11	−2	10	Advance to knockout phase
3	(Austria) Rapid Wien	6	2	1	3	11	13	−2	7	
4	(Republic of Ireland) Dundalk	6	0	0	6	8	19	−11	0	

Source: UEFA
Rules for classification: Group stage tiebreakers

22 October 2020 1	Dundalk (Republic of Ireland)	1–2	(Norway) Molde	Dublin, Ireland
18:55 CEST (UTC+2)	Murray 35'; Gannon (yellow card) 72'	Report	Gregersen (yellow card) 20'; Hussain 62'; Omoijuanfo 72' (pen.)	Stadium: Tallaght Stadium; Attendance: 0 Referee: Petri Viljanen (Finland)
Note: Match played at the Tallaght Stadium in Dublin, instead of Dundalk's regular Oriel Park in Dundalk. Match played behind closed doors due to the COVID-19 pandemic in Europe.

29 October 2020 2	Molde (Norway)	1–0	(Austria) Rapid Wien	Molde, Norway
21:00 CET (UTC+1)	Wingo (yellow card) 39'; Omoijuanfo 65'; Haugen (yellow card) 73'; Aursnes (yellow card) 85'	Report	Stojković (yellow card) 77'; Greiml (yellow card) 79'	Stadium: Aker Stadion; Attendance: 600; Referee: Petr Ardeleánu (Czech Republic)

5 November 2020 3	Arsenal (England)	4–1	(Norway) Molde	London, England
21:00 CET (UTC+1)	Haugen 45+1' (o.g.); David Luiz (yellow card) 58'; Sinyan 62' (o.g.); Pépé 69'; Saka (yellow card) 77'; Willock 88'	Report	Ellingsen 22'	Stadium: Emirates Stadium; Attendance: 0 Referee: Halil Umut Meler (Turkey)
Note: Match played behind closed doors due to the COVID-19 pandemic in Europe.

26 November 2020 4	Molde (Norway)	0–3	(England) Arsenal	Molde, Norway
18:55 CET (UTC+1)		Report	Pépé 50'; Nelson 55'; Balogun 83'	Stadium: Aker Stadion; Attendance: 600; Referee: Irfan Peljto (Bosnia and Herzegovina)

3 December 2020 5	Molde (Norway)	3–1	(Republic of Ireland) Dundalk	Molde, Norway
21:00 CET (UTC+1)	Eikrem 30'; Omoijuanfo 41'; Gregersen (yellow card) 52'; Ellingsen 67'; Risa (yellow card) 84'; Knudtzon (yellow card) 90+2'	Report	Gartland (yellow card) 66'; Flores 90+4'	Stadium: Aker Stadion; Attendance: 600; Referee: Daniel Siebert (Germany)

10 December 2020 6	Rapid Wien (Austria)	2–2	(Norway) Molde	Vienna, Austria
18:55 CET (UTC+1)	Ritzmaier 43'; Ibrahimoglu 90'	Report	Wolff Eikrem 12', 46'	Stadium: Allianz Stadion; Attendance: 0 Referee: Marco Guida (Italy)
Note: Match played behind closed doors due to the COVID-19 pandemic in Europe.

== Squad statistics ==
As of match played 19 December 2020

=== Appearances and goals ===
No.	Pos	Nat	Player	Total		Eliteserien		Norwegian Cup		Champions League		Europa League	
No.	Pos	Nat	Player	Apps	Goals	Apps	Goals	Apps	Goals	Apps	Goals	Apps	Goals
1	GK	(Sweden) SWE	Andreas Linde	38	0	27	0	0	0	5	0	6	0
2	DF	(Norway) NOR	Martin Bjørnbak	23	0	19+1	0	0	0	0	0	3	0
3	DF	(Norway) NOR	Birk Risa	10	0	7	0	0	0	0	0	3	0
5	DF	(The Gambia) GAM	Sheriff Sinyan	25	0	14+5	0	0	0	2	0	3+1	0
6	DF	(Norway) NOR	Stian Gregersen	21	1	10+2	1	0	0	3	0	6	0
7	MF	(Norway) NOR	Magnus Wolff Eikrem	38	12	20+7	7	0	0	5	2	6	3
8	MF	(Norway) NOR	Fredrik Sjølstad	6	0	4+2	0	0	0	0	0	0	0
9	MF	(Sweden) SWE	Mattias Moström	11	1	3+6	1	0	0	0	0	0+2	0
10	FW	(Nigeria) NGR	Leke James	31	15	16+6	13	0	0	4	2	2+3	0
11	MF	(Norway) NOR	Martin Ellingsen	38	8	21+6	5	0	0	5	1	5+1	2
12	GK	(Belgium) BEL	Álex Craninx	3	0	3	0	0	0	0	0	0	0
14	FW	(Norway) NOR	Erling Knudtzon	37	3	12+15	2	0	0	4+1	1	1+4	0
15	MF	(Norway) NOR	Tobias Christensen	24	1	11+9	1	0	0	0+3	0	0+1	0
16	MF	(Norway) NOR	Etzaz Hussain	39	10	27+1	8	0	0	5	1	3+3	1
17	MF	(Norway) NOR	Fredrik Aursnes	38	3	26+1	3	0	0	5	0	6	0
19	MF	(Norway) NOR	Eirik Hestad	33	5	14+9	4	0	0	5	1	5	0
20	MF	(United States) USA	Henry Wingo	27	2	12+7	2	0	0	3	0	4+1	0
22	MF	(Norway) NOR	Ola Brynhildsen	39	5	18+12	5	0	0	1+4	0	2+2	0
23	MF	(Norway) NOR	Eirik Andersen	17	4	7+10	4	0	0	0	0	0	0
27	DF	(Norway) NOR	Marcus Pedersen	27	3	18+3	2	0	0	2+1	1	2+1	0
28	DF	(Norway) NOR	Kristoffer Haugen	23	1	12+3	1	0	0	5	0	3	0
30	MF	(Ivory Coast) CIV	Mathis Bolly	21	1	2+12	1	0	0	0+2	0	2+3	0
37	FW	(Norway) NOR	Ole Sebastian Sundgot	1	0	0+1	0	0	0	0	0	0	0
99	FW	(Norway) NOR	Ohi Omoijuanfo	38	16	17+10	12	0	0	1+4	1	4+2	3
Players away from Molde on loan:
Players who appeared for Molde no longer at the club:
25	DF	(Norway) NOR	John Kitolano	10	1	10	1	0	0	0	0	0	0

=== Goal scorers ===
Rank	Pos.	No.	Nat.	Player	Eliteserien	Norwegian Cup	Champions League	Europa League	Total
1	FW	99	(Norway)	Ohi Omoijuanfo	12	0	1	3	16
2	FW	10	(Nigeria)	Leke James	13	0	2	0	15
3	MF	7	(Norway)	Magnus Wolff Eikrem	7	0	2	3	12
4	MF	16	(Norway)	Etzaz Hussain	8	0	1	1	10
5	MF	11	(Norway)	Martin Ellingsen	5	0	1	2	8
6	MF	19	(Norway)	Eirik Hestad	4	0	1	0	5
7	MF	22	(Norway)	Ola Brynhildsen	4	0	0	0	4
7	MF	23	(Norway)	Eirik Andersen	4	0	0	0	4
9	MF	17	(Norway)	Fredrik Aursnes	3	0	0	0	3
9	FW	14	(Norway)	Erling Knudtzon	2	0	1	0	3
9	DF	27	(Norway)	Marcus Pedersen	2	0	1	0	3
9				Own goal	3	0	0	0	3
13	MF	20	(United States)	Henry Wingo	2	0	0	0	2
14	DF	28	(Norway)	Kristoffer Haugen	1	0	0	0	1
14	DF	6	(Norway)	Stian Gregersen	1	0	0	0	1
14	DF	25	(Norway)	John Kitolano	1	0	0	0	1
14	MF	15	(Norway)	Tobias Christensen	1	0	0	0	1
14	DF	6	(Norway)	Stian Gregersen	1	0	0	0	1
14	MF	30	(Ivory Coast)	Mathis Bolly	1	0	0	0	1
14	MF	9	(Sweden)	Mattias Moström	1	0	0	0	1
TOTALS					77	0	10	9	96

=== Clean sheets ===
Rank	Pos.	No.	Nat.	Player	Eliteserien	Norwegian Cup	Champions League	Europa League	Total
1	GK	1	(Sweden)	Andreas Linde	7	0	3	1	11
2	GK	12	(Belgium)	Álex Craninx	1	0	0	0	1
TOTALS					8	0	3	1	12

=== Disciplinary record ===
No.	Pos.	Nat.	Name	Eliteserien		Norwegian Cup		Champions League		Europa League		Total	
No.	Pos.	Nat.	Name	Yellow card	Red card	Yellow card	Red card	Yellow card	Red card	Yellow card	Red card	Yellow card	Red card
2	DF	(Norway)	Martin Bjørnbak	3	0	0	0	0	0	0	0	3	0
3	DF	(Norway)	Birk Risa	0	0	0	0	0	0	2	0	2	0
5	DF	(The Gambia)	Sheriff Sinyan	3	0	0	0	0	0	1	0	4	0
6	DF	(Norway)	Stian Gregersen	3	0	0	0	1	0	2	0	6	0
7	MF	(Norway)	Magnus Wolff Eikrem	5	0	0	0	0	0	0	0	5	0
8	MF	(Norway)	Fredrik Sjølstad	2	1	0	0	0	0	0	0	2	1
10	FW	(Nigeria)	Leke James	5	1	0	0	1	0	0	0	6	1
11	MF	(Norway)	Martin Ellingsen	2	0	0	0	1	0	0	0	3	0
14	FW	(Norway)	Erling Knudtzon	1	0	0	0	1	0	1	0	3	0
15	MF	(Norway)	Tobias Christensen	4	0	0	0	0	0	0	0	4	0
16	MF	(Norway)	Etzaz Hussain	6	0	0	0	2	0	0	0	8	0
17	MF	(Norway)	Fredrik Aursnes	5	0	0	0	2	0	2	0	9	0
19	MF	(Norway)	Eirik Hestad	4	0	0	0	2	0	0	0	6	0
20	MF	(United States)	Henry Wingo	2	0	0	0	0	0	1	0	3	0
22	MF	(Norway)	Ola Brynhildsen	2	0	0	0	0	0	0	0	2	0
23	MF	(Norway)	Eirik Andersen	1	0	0	0	0	0	0	0	1	0
27	DF	(Norway)	Marcus Pedersen	2	0	0	0	1	0	0	0	3	0
28	DF	(Norway)	Kristoffer Haugen	2	0	0	0	0	0	1	0	3	0
30	MF	(Ivory Coast)	Mathis Bolly	2	0	0	0	0	0	0	0	2	0
99	MF	(Norway)	Ohi Omoijuanfo	1	0	0	0	0	0	0	0	1	0
Players who appeared for Molde no longer at the club:
25	DF	(Norway)	John Kitolano	1	1	0	0	0	0	0	0	1	1
TOTALS				56	3	0	0	11	0	10	0	77	3

== See also ==
- Molde FK seasons
