= Álex Craninx =

Belgian association football player

Personal information
- Full name: Alexandro Marco Craninx Joostens
- Date of birth: 21 October 1995 (age 31)
- Place of birth: Málaga, Spain
- Height: 1.97 m (6 ft 5 1/2 in)
- Position: Goalkeeper

Team information
- Current team: Panionios
- Number: 1

Youth career
- 2000–2008: La Laguna
- 2008–2011: Fuengirola
- 2011: Marbella
- 2011–2014: Real Madrid

Senior career*
Years	Team	Apps	(Gls)
2014–2015	Real Madrid C	14	(0)
2015–2017	Real Madrid B	4	(0)
2017–2018	Jong Sparta	10	(0)
2018	Cartagena	0	(0)
2018–2022	Molde	17	(0)
2021	→ Lillestrøm (loan)	2	(0)
2022	→ Seraing (loan)	0	(0)
2023–2024	CF Fuenlabrada	16	(0)
2025–2026	Gnistan	42	(0)
2026–	Panionios	3	(0)

International career^{‡}
2013	Belgium U18	3	(0)
2013	Belgium U19	3	(0)
- * Club domestic league appearances and goals as of 19 September 2026 ‡ National team caps and goals as of 13 November 2013

Alejandro "Álex" Marco Craninx Joostens (born 21 October 1995) is a professional footballer who plays as a goalkeeper for Super League Greece 2 club Panionios.

== Club career ==
=== Real Madrid ===
Born in Málaga, Andalusia, Craninx joined Real Madrid's La Fábrica in 2011, from UD Marbella. He made his senior debut with the C-team on 5 October 2014, starting in a 1–1 Tercera División home draw against AD Unión Adarve.

On 15 July 2015, Craninx renewed his contract and was promoted to the B-team in Segunda División B, but acted as a backup to Alfonso Herrero and Carlos Abad during his spell.

=== Sparta Rotterdam ===
On 25 July 2017, Craninx signed for Sparta Rotterdam, but was assigned to the reserve side in the Tweede Divisie.

=== Cartagena ===
On 31 January 2018, Craninx returned to Spain after agreeing to a six-month contract with third division side FC Cartagena.

=== Molde ===
On 27 July 2018, Craninx agreed a two-and-a-half-year deal with Norwegian club Molde. He made his first team debut in the Molde's Norwegian Cup first round match against Eide/Omegn on 1 May 2019, a game Molde won 5−0. He got his league debut on 26 May in Molde's 1−2 loss against Tromsø on 26 May 2019. He made his debut in UEFA competitions in Molde's 7–1 win over KR in the UEFA Europa League first qualifying round on 11 July 2019. He played 14 games and kept a clean sheet in four of them in the club's title-winning 2019 season. Craninx got 25 appearances in all competitions. On 3 December 2019, Molde announced that Craninx had agreed to an extension of his contract that will keep him at the club until the end of the 2023 season.

On 31 January 2022, Craninx was loaned to Seraing until the end of the season.

On 31 January 2023, Craninx was released by Molde.

=== CF Fuenlabrada ===
On 8 February 2023, Craninx signed for CF Fuenlabrada on a short-term contract until the end of the season.

=== Gnistan ===
On 17 December 2024, Finnish Veikkausliiga club IF Gnistan announced the signing of Craninx on a 1+1-year deal, starting in January 2025

== International career ==
Born in Spain, Craninx has played a total of 6 games for Belgium at youth international level.

== Career statistics ==
As of 27 July 2026

Appearances and goals by club, season and competition
Club	Season	League			National Cup		Continental		Other		Total	
Club	Season	Division	Apps	Goals	Apps	Goals	Apps	Goals	Apps	Goals	Apps	Goals
Real Madrid C	2013–14	Segunda División B	0	0	—		—		—		0	0
Real Madrid C	2014–15	Tercera División	14	0	—		—		—		14	0
Real Madrid C	Total		14	0	—	—	—	—	—	—	14	0
Real Madrid Castilla	2015–16	Segunda División B	1	0	—		—		—		1	0
Real Madrid Castilla	2016–17	Segunda División B	3	0	—		—		—		3	0
Real Madrid Castilla	Total		4	0	—	—	—	—	—	—	4	0
Jong Sparta	2017–18	Tweede Divisie	10	0	—		—		—		10	0
Sparta Rotterdam	2017–18	Eredivisie	0	0	0	0	—		—		0	0
Cartagena	2017–18	Segunda División B	0	0	—		—		—		0	0
Molde	2018	Eliteserien	0	0	0	0	0	0	—		0	0
Molde	2019	Eliteserien	14	0	3	0	8 (Note: Appearances in UEFA Europa League)	0	—		25	0
Molde	2020	Eliteserien	3	0	0	0	0	0	—		3	0
Molde	2021	Eliteserien	0	0	1	0	0	0	–		1	0
Molde	2022	Eliteserien	0	0	0	0	0	0	–		0	0
Molde	Total		17	0	4	0	8	0	—	—	29	0
Lillestrøm (loan)	2021	Eliteserien	2	0	0	0	0	0	—		2	0
Seraing (loan)	2021–22	Belgian Pro League	0	0	0	0	—		—		0	0
CF Fuenlabrada	2022–23	Primera Federación	16	0	—		—		—		16	0
CF Fuenlabrada	2023–24	Primera Federación	0	0	—		—		—		0	0
CF Fuenlabrada	Total		16	0	0	0	0	0	0	0	16	0
Gnistan	2025	Veikkausliiga	29	0	3	0	–		4 (Note: Appearances in Finnish League Cup)	0	36	0
Gnistan	2026	Veikkausliiga	13	0	0	0	–		3 (Note: Appearances in Finnish League Cup)	0	16	0
Gnistan	Total		42	0	3	0	0	0	7	0	52	0
Career total			118	0	7	0	8	0	7	0	140	0

== Honours ==
Molde

- Eliteserien: 2019
