= Mathis Bolly =

Norwegian-born Ivorian footballer (born 1990)

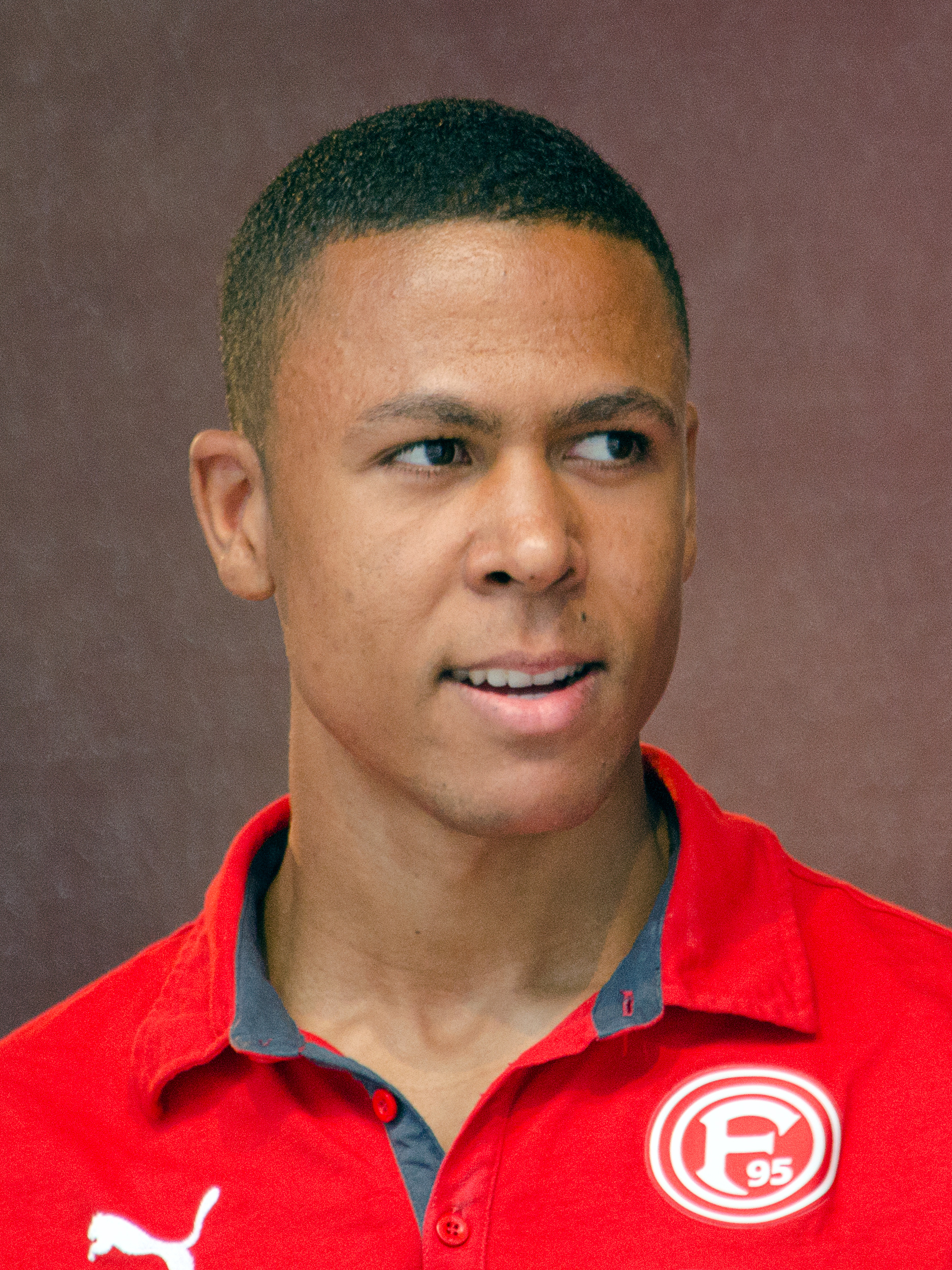
- Bolly in 2014

Personal information
- Full name: Mathis Gazoa Kippersund Bolly
- Date of birth: 14 November 1990 (age 35)
- Place of birth: Oslo, Norway
- Height: 1.86 m (6 ft 1 in)
- Position: Forward

Youth career
- Holmlia

Senior career*
Years	Team	Apps	(Gls)
2008–2012	Lillestrøm	60	(7)
2013–2016	Fortuna Düsseldorf	50	(6)
2016–2018	Greuther Fürth	16	(1)
2019–2022	Molde	44	(4)
2021	→ Stabæk (loan)	15	(3)
2023–2024	Lillestrøm	18	(1)

International career^{‡}
2009	Norway U19	3	(0)
2013–2014	Ivory Coast	5	(0)
- * Club domestic league appearances and goals as of 24 November 2024 ‡ National team caps and goals as of 10 June 2014

Mathis Gazoa Kippersund Bolly (born 14 November 1990) is a former professional footballer who played as a forward. Bolly made his professional debut for the Norwegian top flight side Lillestrøm. He represented Norway at youth international level, but chose to represent Ivory Coast national.

== Club career ==
Born in Oslo to a Norwegian mother and an Ivorian father, Bolly grew up at Holmlia in Oslo and played youth football for Lyn, Oppsal IL and Holmlia before transferring to Lillestrøm in 2008. He made his debut for the first team in the Tippeligaen match against Stabæk and played two matches in his first season with the club. In the 2009 season, Bolly's second season with Lillestrøm, he played 10 matches in Tippeligaen. Bolly scored his first Tippeligaen goal in the 1–0 victory against Sandefjord on 3 October 2010. During the 2012 season Bolly scored four goals and made four assists. His contract with Lillestrøm lasted till the end of the 2013 season, though he had told the club that he didn't want to renew his contract. Lillestrøm subsequently accepted an offer from Fortuna Düsseldorf and on 2 January 2013, Bolly signed for a three-and-a-half-year contract with the German side.

Bolly made his Bundesliga debut in the match against Mainz 05 when he came on as a substitute. He started the next match against Bayern Munich on 9 March 2013, where he also scored one of Fortuna Düsseldorf's goals in the 3–2 loss. The next week, Bolly scored another goal when Fortuna Düsseldorf drew 1–1 away against VfL Wolfsburg. Fortuna Düsseldorf was relegated after the 2012–13 season, but Bolly stayed with the team when they played in the 2. Bundesliga in the following season.

On 19 February 2019, Bolly joined Molde on a one-year contract. He got his Molde debut on 18 July 2019 when he came on as a 62nd-minute substitute in Molde's 0–0 draw away against KR in the 2019–20 UEFA Europa League first qualifying round. On 1 October 2019, Molde announced that they had agreed a contract extension with Bolly that will keep him at the club till the end of the 2022 season.

== International career ==
Bolly played three matches for the Norwegian under-19 team in 2009, and was called up for the under-21 team in February and March 2013. He was also included in the Norwegian preliminary squad for the 2013 UEFA European Under-21 Football Championship, but withdrew from the squad when he in May 2013 was called up for the Ivory Coast national team for the World Cup qualifiers against Gambia and Tanzania. His former manager at Lillestrøm, Henning Berg, stated that it was a big loss for Norway and that Bolly could have been an important player for the national team in the future. He played his first game for the Ivory Coast against Gambia on 8 June 2013. He played his second match for Ivory Coast in the friendly match against Mexico in August 2013, playing alongside Didier Drogba. Bolly was an unused substitute in the decisive play-off match against Senegal when Ivory Coast qualified for the 2014 World Cup. He was selected to represent the Ivory Coast at the 2014 Fifa World Cup in Brazil, and got his World Cup debut as a second-half substitute in the Ivory Coast's second group game against Colombia.

== Style of play ==
When he joined Lillestrøm in 2008, Bolly ran 40 meters in 4.77 seconds. After the 2009 season, he improved his time to 4.61 seconds, making him the second-fastest Tippeligaen player recorded at the time, behind only Luton Shelton. When EA Sports released FIFA 14, Bolly was the fastest player in the game in terms of sprint speed. As of FIFA 17, he still held this distinction. However, in FIFA 18, Pierre-Emerick Aubameyang became the fastest player in the game in terms of sprint speed and acceleration.

== Career statistics ==
As of match played 6 October 2022

Appearances and goals by club, season and competition
Club	Season	League			Cup		Continental		Total	
Club	Season	Division	Apps	Goals	Apps	Goals	Apps	Goals	Apps	Goals
Lillestrøm	2008	Tippeligaen	2	0	0	0	0	0	2	0
Lillestrøm	2009	Tippeligaen	10	0	2	0	—		12	0
Lillestrøm	2010	Tippeligaen	8	1	0	0	—		8	1
Lillestrøm	2011	Tippeligaen	16	2	0	0	—		16	2
Lillestrøm	2012	Tippeligaen	24	4	4	0	—		28	4
Lillestrøm	Total		60	7	6	0	—	—	66	7
Fortuna Düsseldorf	2012–13	Bundesliga	7	2	0	0	—		7	2
Fortuna Düsseldorf	2013–14	2. Bundesliga	14	1	1	0	—		15	1
Fortuna Düsseldorf	2014–15	2. Bundesliga	11	1	5	0	—		16	1
Fortuna Düsseldorf	2015–16	2. Bundesliga	18	2	1	0	—		19	2
Fortuna Düsseldorf	Total		50	6	7	0	—	—	57	6
Greuther Fürth	2016–17	2. Bundesliga	16	1	1	0	—		17	1
Greuther Fürth	2017–18	2. Bundesliga	0	0	0	0	—		0	0
Greuther Fürth	Total		16	1	1	0	—	—	17	1
Molde	2019	Eliteserien	13	3	0	0	6 (Note: Appearances in UEFA Europa League, including qualifying games)	2	19	5
Molde	2020	Eliteserien	14	1	0	0	7	0	21	1
Molde	2021	Eliteserien	8	0	0	0	3	0	11	0
Molde	2022	Eliteserien	9	0	3	0	3	0	15	0
Molde	Total		44	4	3	0	19	2	66	6
Stabæk (loan)	2021	Eliteserien	11	3	1	0	—		12	3
Stabæk (loan)	Total		11	3	1	0	—	—	12	3
Career total			181	20	18	0	19	2	218	23

== Honours ==
Molde

- Eliteserien: 2019
- Norwegian Cup: 2021–22
