= Tobias Christensen (footballer, born 2000) =

Norwegian footballer (born 2000)

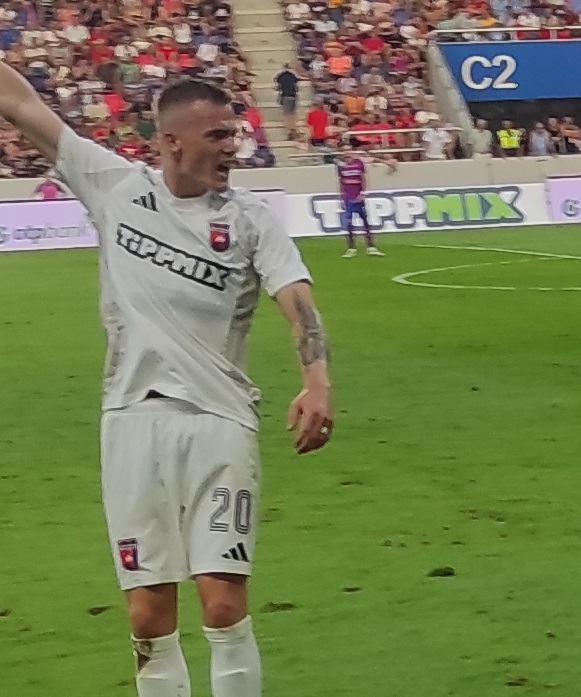
- Christensen with Fehérvár in 2024

Personal information
- Full name: Tobias Christensen
- Date of birth: 11 May 2000 (age 26)
- Place of birth: Kristiansand, Norway
- Height: 1.80 m (5 ft 11 in)
- Position: Midfielder

Team information
- Current team: Wieczysta Kraków
- Number: 10

Youth career
- 2013–2014: Vigør
- 2015–2016: Start

Senior career*
Years	Team	Apps	(Gls)
2015	Vigør	8	(1)
2015–2016	Start II		
2017–2019	Start	63	(7)
2019–2021	Molde	26	(2)
2021–2023	Vålerenga	58	(5)
2023–2024	Fehérvár	52	(9)
2024–2026	Rapid București	67	(4)
2026–	Wieczysta Kraków	3	(3)

International career^{‡}
2016	Norway U16	8	(0)
2017	Norway U17	6	(0)
2018	Norway U18	8	(3)
2018–2019	Norway U19	11	(1)
2019	Norway U20	3	(0)
2019–2023	Norway U21	19	(4)
- * Club domestic league appearances and goals as of 15 August 2026 ‡ National team caps and goals as of 22 June 2023

Tobias Christensen (born 11 May 2000) is a Norwegian professional footballer who plays as a midfielder for Ekstraklasa club Wieczysta Kraków.

== Club career ==
=== Early career ===
Christensen played for Vigør through 2015, before joining Start ahead of the 2016 season. He made his Eliteserien debut in March 2018 against Tromsø.

=== Molde ===
In August 2019, Christensen signed for Molde. He made his debut for the club when he came in as a 70th minute substitute in a 2–2 draw away against Odd. On 24 November 2019, he scored his first goal for Molde in their 4−2 win against Vålerenga.

=== Fehérvár ===
On 3 January 2023, Christensen signed a contract with Fehérvár in Hungary until June 2025.

=== Rapid Bucureşti ===
On 9 September 2024, Christensen signed a contract with Romanian club Rapid București until June 2027.

=== Wieczysta Kraków ===
On 18 June 2026, Christensen moved to Polish Ekstraklasa newcomers Wieczysta Kraków on a two-year deal, with an option for another year. On 15 August, he scored his second career hat-trick in a 4–3 away win over Piast Gliwice, his club's first-ever win in the Polish top division.

== Career statistics ==
As of match played 15 August 2026

Appearances and goals by club, season and competition
Club	Season	League			National cup (Note: Includes Norwegian Cup, Magyar Kupa, Cupa României)		Europe		Other		Total	
Club	Season	Division	Apps	Goals	Apps	Goals	Apps	Goals	Apps	Goals	Apps	Goals
Vigør	2015	3. divisjon	8	1	2	0	—		—		10	1
Start	2017	1. divisjon	23	1	2	1	—		—		25	2
Start	2018	Eliteserien	25	1	5	1	—		—		30	2
Start	2019	1. divisjon	15	5	1	0	—		—		16	5
Start	Total		63	7	8	2	—		—		71	9
Molde	2019	Eliteserien	6	1	0	0	—		—		6	1
Molde	2020	Eliteserien	20	1	0	0	4 (Note: Three appearances in UEFA Champions League, one appearance in UEFA Europa League)	0	—		24	1
Molde	2021	Eliteserien	—		—		1 (Note: Appearances in UEFA Europa League)	0	—		6	0
Molde	Total		26	2	0	0	5	0	—		31	2
Vålerenga	2021	Eliteserien	30	3	3	2	2 (Note: Appearances in UEFA Conference League)	0	—		35	5
Vålerenga	2022	Eliteserien	28	2	3	0	—		—		31	2
Vålerenga	Total		58	5	6	2	2	0	—		66	7
Fehérvár	2022–23	Nemzeti Bajnokság I	14	0	—		—		—		14	0
Fehérvár	2023–24	Nemzeti Bajnokság I	32	9	1	0	—		—		33	9
Fehérvár	2024–25	Nemzeti Bajnokság I	6	0	—		4	1	—		10	1
Fehérvár	Total		52	9	1	0	4	1	—		57	10
Rapid București	2024–25	Liga I	31	3	3	0	—		—		34	3
Rapid București	2025–26	Liga I	36	1	3	0	—		—		39	1
Rapid București	Total		67	4	6	0	—		—		73	4
Wieczysta Kraków	2026–27	Ekstraklasa	3	3	0	0	—		—		3	3
Career total			277	31	23	4	11	1	—		311	36

== Honours ==
Molde

- Eliteserien: 2019
