= Kristoffer Haraldseid =

Norwegian footballer (born 1994)

Personal information
- Date of birth: 17 January 1994 (age 32)
- Place of birth: Haugesund, Norway
- Height: 1.80 m (5 ft 11 in)
- Position: Defender

Youth career
- Vats 94
- Skjold
- Haugesund

Senior career*
Years	Team	Apps	(Gls)
2011–2018	Haugesund	178	(6)
2019–2022	Molde	28	(1)

International career^{‡}
2009	Norway U15	2	(0)
2010	Norway U16	10	(0)
2011	Norway U17	13	(0)
2012	Norway U18	10	(0)
2013	Norway U19	7	(1)
2013–2016	Norway U21	26	(0)
- * Club domestic league appearances and goals as of 1 December 2019 ‡ National team caps and goals as of 15 November 2016

Kristoffer Haraldseid (born 17 January 1994) is a Norwegian professional footballer who last played as a defender for Eliteserien club Molde.

== Club career ==
=== Haugesund ===
Haraldseid was born in Haugesund. He made his senior debut for Haugesund on 27 August 2011 against Vålerenga; Haugesund lost 3–2.

=== Molde ===
On 2 February 2019, Haraldseid joined Molde. He signed a four-year contract with the club. He made his Molde debut on 31 March 2019 in a 1–1 away draw against Sarpsborg 08. On 12 May 2019, he scored his first goal for the club in Molde's 1–0 win at home against Mjøndalen. He got his 200th Eliteserien appearance in Molde's 2–1 win at home against Lillestrøm on 29 September 2019.

== International career ==
Haraldseid played a total of 68 games and scored one goal for Norway at international youth level.

== Career statistics ==
As of 1 December 2019

Club	Season	Division	League		Cup		Continental		Other		Total	
Club	Season	Division	Apps	Goals	Apps	Goals	Apps	Goals	Apps	Goals	Apps	Goals
Haugesund	2011	Tippeligaen	8	0	1	0	–		–		9	0
Haugesund	2012	Tippeligaen	8	0	3	0	–		–		11	0
Haugesund	2013	Tippeligaen	26	2	5	1	–		–		31	3
Haugesund	2014	Tippeligaen	27	1	4	0	4	0	–		35	1
Haugesund	2015	Tippeligaen	28	1	1	0	–		–		29	1
Haugesund	2016	Tippeligaen	25	2	3	0	–		–		28	2
Haugesund	2017	Eliteserien	28	0	4	0	3	0	–		35	0
Haugesund	2018	Eliteserien	29	0	5	0	–		–		34	0
Haugesund	Total		179	6	26	1	7	0	–	–	212	7
Molde	2019	Eliteserien	28	1	0	0	8	0	–		36	1
Molde	2020	Eliteserien	0	0	0	0	–		–		0	0
Molde	2021	Eliteserien	0	0	0	0	–		–		0	0
Molde	2022	Eliteserien	0	0	0	0					0	0
Molde	Total		28	1	0	0	8	0	–	–	36	1
Career total			207	7	26	1	15	0	0	0	248	8

== Honours ==
- Eliteserien: 2019, 2022
- Norwegian Cup: 2022
