= Fredrik Sjølstad =

Norwegian football player (born 1994)

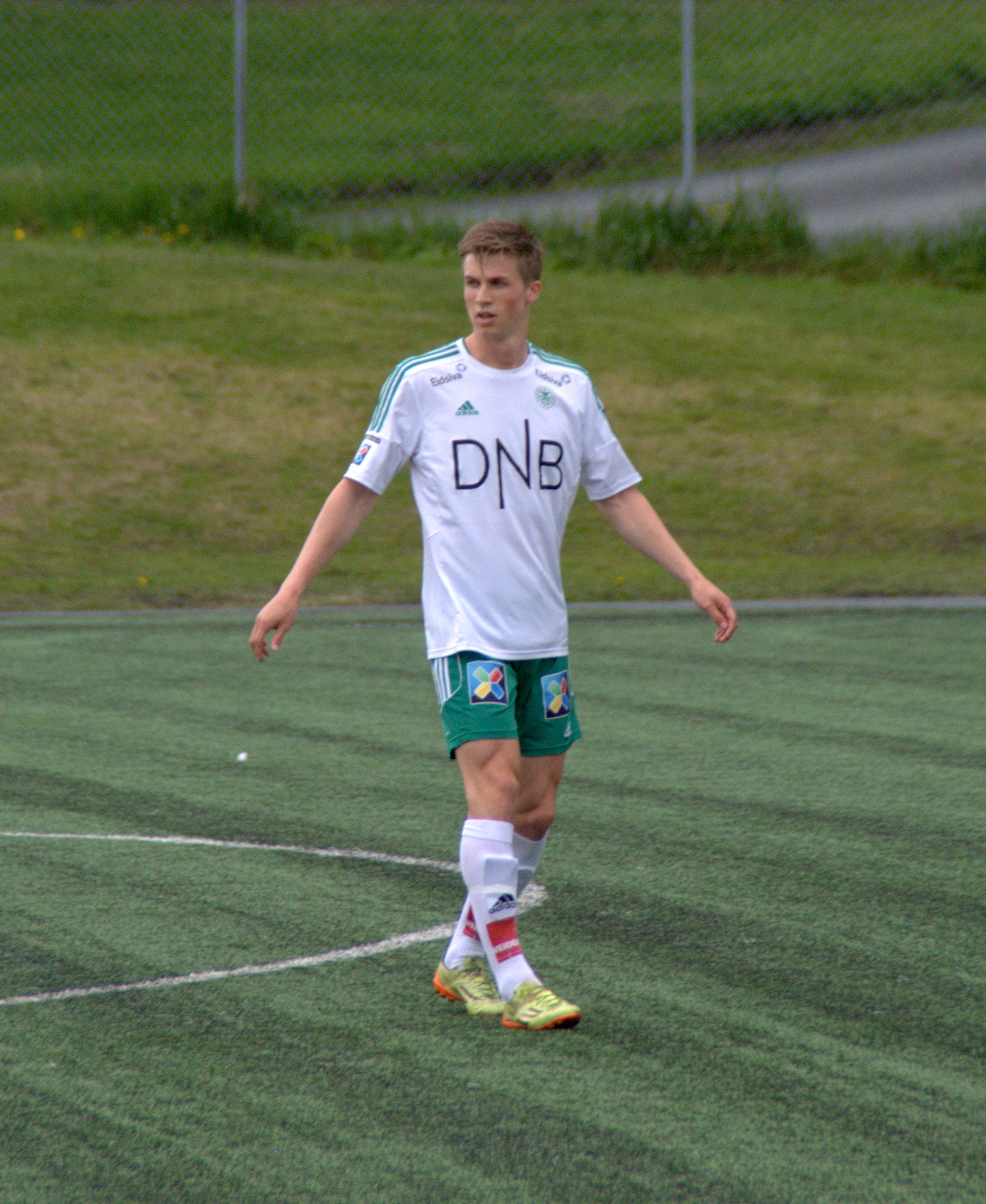
- Sjølstad in 2015

Personal information
- Full name: Fredrik Vangstad Sjølstad
- Date of birth: 29 March 1994 (age 32)
- Place of birth: Oslo, Norway
- Position: Midfielder

Team information
- Current team: HamKam
- Number: 23

Youth career
- –2011: HamKam

Senior career*
Years	Team	Apps	(Gls)
2011–2015	HamKam	77	(8)
2016	Hødd	27	(0)
2017–2018	Kongsvinger	45	(2)
2019–2021	Molde	28	(1)
2022–	HamKam	112	(2)
- * Club domestic league appearances and goals as of 23 July 2026

Fredrik Vangstad Sjølstad (born 29 March 1994) is a Norwegian professional footballer who plays as a midfielder for Eliteserien club HamKam.

== Career ==
=== HamKam ===
Sjølstad was brought up from Hamarkameratene's junior team in the start of the 2011 season and played three 1. divisjon games in his first season. His debut came on 28 September 2011 when Sjølstad came in as a 78th minute substitute in a 2–0 home win against Alta.

=== Hødd ===
In January 2016, Sjølstad signed a two-year contract with 1. divisjon side Hødd. He played 27 league games for the club who relegated to the 2. divisjon.

=== Kongsvinger ===
On 29 March 2017, Fredrik Sjølstad was sold to Kongsvinger. He made his debut for the club on 4 April 2017 in a 3–2 defeat away to Bodø/Glimt.

=== Molde ===
On 8 January 2019, Molde FK announced Fredrik Sjølstad as their first signing in 2019. He signed a three-year deal with the Eliteserien club. On 7 April 2019, Sjølstad made his Molde debut as an 80th minute substitute in a 3–0 home win against Stabæk. He made his debut in UEFA competitions when he came in as a 70th minute substitute in Molde's 7–1 win over KR in the UEFA Europa League first qualifying round on 11 July 2019. Sjølstad scored his first goal for the club on 21 July 2019, when he scored the match-winning goal in Molde's 2–1 win over Sarpsborg 08 in Eliteserien.

=== Return to HamKam ===
On 18 January 2022, he returned to HamKam on a three-year contract.

== Career statistics ==
=== Club ===
As of match played 3 August 2025

Appearances and goals by club, season and competition
Club	Season	League			National Cup		Continental		Other		Total	
Club	Season	Division	Apps	Goals	Apps	Goals	Apps	Goals	Apps	Goals	Apps	Goals
HamKam	2011	1. divisjon	3	0	0	0	—		—		3	0
HamKam	2012	1. divisjon	3	0	1	0	—		—		4	0
HamKam	2013	1. divisjon	29	1	4	0	—		1	0	34	1
HamKam	2014	1. divisjon	18	2	1	2	—		—		19	4
HamKam	2015	2. divisjon	24	5	2	0	—		—		26	5
HamKam	Total		77	8	8	2	—	—	1	0	86	10
Hødd	2016	1. divisjon	27	0	1	0	—		—		28	0
Kongsvinger	2017	1. divisjon	26	1	2	0	—		—		28	1
Kongsvinger	2018	1. divisjon	29	1	2	0	—		—		31	1
Kongsvinger	Total		55	2	4	0	—	—	—	—	59	2
Molde	2019	Eliteserien	16	1	3	0	2	0	0	0	21	1
Molde	2020	Eliteserien	6	0	0	0	0	0	0	0	6	0
Molde	2021	Eliteserien	6	0	0	0	0	0	0	0	6	0
Molde	Total		28	1	3	0	2	0	0	0	33	1
HamKam	2022	Eliteserien	27	2	2	0	—		—		29	2
HamKam	2023	Eliteserien	24	0	4	1	—		—		28	1
HamKam	2024	Eliteserien	23	0	0	0	—		—		23	0
HamKam	2025	Eliteserien	12	0	1	0	—		—		13	0
HamKam	Total		86	2	7	1	—	—	0	0	93	3
Career total			273	13	23	3	2	0	1	0	299	16

== Honours ==
Molde

- Eliteserien: 2019
