= 2019 Molde FK season =

Molde
2019 season
- Chairman: Odd Ivar Moen
- Manager: Erling Moe (from 19 December 2018)
- Stadium: Aker Stadion
- Eliteserien: 1st (champions)
- Norwegian Cup: Third round vs. Aalesund
- Mesterfinalen: Cancelled
- Europa League: Play-off Round vs Partizan
- Top goalscorer: League: Leke James (17); All: Leke James (24)
Home colours	Away colours	Third colours

The 2019 season was Molde's 12th consecutive year in Eliteserien, and their 43rd season in the top flight of Norwegian football. They participated in Eliteserien, winning the title for the 4th time, reached the third round of the Cup and were knocked out of the 2019–20 UEFA Europa League in the playoff round by FK Partizan after entering at the First qualifying round stage. Molde were scheduled to take part in the 2019 Mesterfinalen against Rosenborg, but the match was cancelled 15 March 2019 due to heavy rain.

== Season events ==
On 19 December 2018, Molde announced that manager Ole Gunnar Solskjær had been "loaned" to Manchester United as their caretaker manager until the end of the 2018–19 season, Erling Moe taking charge of Molde during this period. On 28 March 2019, Manchester United announced the permanent appointment of Solskjær as their manager. On 16 June, in Molde's won 2–0 home win against Ranheim, the club scored for a 29th consecutive league games, breaking the club record of scoring in 28 consecutive league matches from the 2014 season. Molde were eliminated from the Norwegian Cup on 19 June, after being defeated 0–4 away to Aalesund in the third round. The record goalscoring run of scoring in 40 consecutive league games ended on 6 October with a goalless draw against Brann at Brann Stadion. On 10 November 2019, Molde won the league title with two games to spare after Strømsgodset were defeated with the score 4–0.

=== Norwegian Cup ===
Molde entered the Norwegian Cup in the first round. The first round schedule was announced on 11 April and paired Molde with fifth tier side Eide/Omegn. Molde won the match 5–0; Leke James opened the scoring in the 10th minute, and Eirik Ulland Andersen scored Molde's second goal. James scored his second, Molde's third, and Ulland Andersen completed his first hat-trick for Molde with two goals in the second half, the first from the penalty spot. Late in the game, Ulland Andersen was removed from the pitch with an injury to his Achilles tendon, which possibly rules him out for the rest of the season. Goalkeeper Álex Craninx and midfielder Emil Breivik (substitute) got their debut for the club against Eide/Omegn. On 6 May, it was announced that Sunndal from 3. divisjon, whom they last met in the first round seven seasons earlier, when they won 4–0, were Molde's opponent in the second round. The result was the same on this occasion; Christoffer Remmer scored his first goal in his senior career early in the game, before James scored his third goal of the Norwegian Cup season. 17-year-old winger Jakob Ørsahl made his Molde debut and scored both the third and fourth goal. Under–19 players Tobias Hestad, Markus Eiane and Oliver Petersen were all brought on to their club debut in the second half. NFF paired Molde with local rivals Aalesund in the third round. On 19 June, Molde were knocked out of the Norwegian Cup after a 0–4 defeat away to second tier side Aalesund. Molde's captain Ruben Gabrielsen was sent off about half an hour into the game on the score 0–2.

== Squad ==
As of match played 1 December 2019

No.	Name	Nationality	Position	Date of birth (age)	Signed from	Signed in	Contract ends	Apps.	Goals
Goalkeepers
1	Andreas Linde	(Sweden)	GK	24 July 1993 (aged 26)	Helsingborg	2015	2021	105	0
12	Álex Craninx	(Belgium)	GK	21 October 1995 (aged 24)	Cartagena	2018	2023	25	0
26	Mathias Ranmark	(Norway)	GK	16 October 1995 (aged 24)	Oppsal	2017	2021	3	0
52	Oliver Petersen	(Norway)	GK	26 September 2001 (aged 18)	Academy	2019		1	0
Defenders
2	Martin Bjørnbak	(Norway)	DF	22 March 1992 (aged 27)	Bodø/Glimt	2019	2022	33	0
4	Ruben Gabrielsen	(Norway)	DF	10 March 1992 (aged 27)	Lillestrøm	2014	2019	171	8
5	Vegard Forren	(Norway)	DF	16 February 1988 (aged 31)	Brighton & Hove Albion	2017	2021	384	18
18	Kristoffer Haraldseid	(Norway)	DF	17 January 1994 (aged 25)	Haugesund	2019	2022	36	1
28	Kristoffer Haugen	(Norway)	DF	21 February 1994 (aged 25)	Viking	2018	2020	61	2
Midfielders
7	Magnus Wolff Eikrem	(Norway)	MF	8 August 1990 (aged 29)	Seattle Sounders FC	2018	2022	139	28
8	Fredrik Sjølstad	(Norway)	MF	29 March 1994 (aged 25)	Kongsvinger	2019	2021	21	1
9	Mattias Moström	(Sweden)	MF	25 February 1983 (aged 36)	AIK	2007	2019	357	36
11	Martin Ellingsen	(Norway)	MF	2 May 1995 (aged 24)	Kongsvinger	2017	2022	45	7
15	Tobias Christensen	(Norway)	MF	11 May 2000 (aged 19)	Start	2019	2022	6	1
16	Etzaz Hussain	(Norway)	MF	27 January 1993 (aged 26)	Rudeš	2017	2019	194	21
17	Fredrik Aursnes	(Norway)	MF	10 December 1995 (aged 23)	Hødd	2016	2021	133	16
19	Eirik Hestad	(Norway)	MF	26 June 1995 (aged 24)	Academy	2012	2021	169	27
20	Henry Wingo	(United States)	MF	4 October 1995 (aged 24)	Seattle Sounders FC	2019	2021	3	0
23	Eirik Ulland Andersen	(Norway)	MF	21 September 1992 (aged 27)	Strømsgodset	2019	2022	6	4
30	Mathis Bolly	(Ivory Coast)	MF	14 November 1990 (aged 29)	Free agent	2019	2022	19	5
46	Tobias Hestad	(Norway)	MF	29 December 2000 (aged 18)	Academy		2020	1	0
50	Jakob Ørsahl	(Norway)	MF	14 July 2001 (aged 18)	Academy			1	2
Forwards
10	Leke James	(Nigeria)	FW	1 November 1992 (aged 27)	Free agent	2018	2020	52	28
14	Erling Knudtzon	(Norway)	FW	15 December 1988 (aged 30)	Lillestrøm	2019	2021	29	4
48	Markus Eiane	(Norway)	FW	23 March 2001 (aged 18)	Academy			1	0
99	Ohi Omoijuanfo	(Norway)	FW	10 January 1994 (aged 25)	Stabæk	2019	2021	35	16
Out on loan
6	Stian Rode Gregersen	(Norway)	DF	17 May 1995 (aged 24)	Academy	2013	2020	56	1
21	Tobias Svendsen	(Norway)	MF	31 August 1999 (aged 20)	Academy	2015	2020	23	1
25	Martin Ove Roseth	(Norway)	DF	10 July 1998 (aged 21)	Academy	2016	2021	3	0
27	Daniel Chima Chukwu	(Nigeria)	FW	4 April 1991 (aged 28)	Legia Warszawa	2018	2020	163	56
45	Emil Breivik	(Norway)	DF	11 June 2000 (aged 19)	Academy		2022	3	0
49	Sivert Gussiås	(Norway)	FW	18 August 1999 (aged 20)	Academy	2018	2019	1	0
Players who left club during season
3	Christopher Telo	(Sweden)	DF	4 November 1989 (aged 30)	IFK Norrköping	2017	2020	10	0
20	Thomas Amang	(Cameroon)	FW	9 February 1998 (aged 21)	Rainbow Bamenda	2016	2020	50	11
22	Christoffer Remmer	(Denmark)	DF	16 January 1993 (aged 26)	Copenhagen	2016	2019	81	1

== Transfers ==
=== In ===
Date	Position	Nationality	Name	From	Fee	Ref.
1 January 2019†	MF	(Norway)	Erling Knudtzon	Lillestrøm	Free	
8 January 2019	MF	(Norway)	Fredrik Sjølstad	Kongsvinger	Undisclosed	
16 January 2019	MF	(Norway)	Eirik Ulland Andersen	Strømsgodset	Undisclosed	
17 January 2019	DF	(Norway)	Martin Bjørnbak	Bodø/Glimt	Undisclosed	
2 February 2019	DF	(Norway)	Kristoffer Haraldseid	Haugesund	Undisclosed	
19 February 2019	MF	(Ivory Coast)	Mathis Bolly	Free agent	Free	
21 March 2019	FW	(Norway)	Ohi Omoijuanfo	Stabæk	Undisclosed	
10 August 2019	MF	(Norway)	Tobias Christensen	Start	Undisclosed	
12 August 2019	MF	(United States)	Henry Wingo	Seattle Sounders FC	Undisclosed	

† Knudtzon's move was announced on 17 July 2018 and finalised on 1 January 2019.

=== Out ===
Date	Position	Nationality	Name	To	Fee	Ref.
4 December 2018	MF	(Senegal)	Ibrahima Wadji	Haugesund	Undisclosed	
15 December 2018	FW	(Iceland)	Óttar Magnús Karlsson	Mjällby	Undisclosed	
1 January 2019	MF	(Norway)	Hermann Svendsen	Træff	Undisclosed	
1 January 2019†	FW	(Norway)	Erling Haaland	Red Bull Salzburg	Undisclosed (Note: Fee reported as NOK 100 million)	
11 January 2019	FW	(Norway)	Fredrik Brustad	Mjøndalen	Undisclosed	
25 January 2019	DF	(Norway)	Elias Mordal	Brattvåg	Undisclosed	
1 February 2019	DF	(Faroe Islands)	Sonni Nattestad	Fredericia	Undisclosed	
18 March 2019	FW	(Norway)	Christian Dahl	Moss	Undisclosed	
31 July 2019	DF	(Norway)	Thor-Olav Moe	Åsane	Undisclosed	
9 August 2019	FW	(Norway)	Magnus Langset	Notodden	Undisclosed	
26 August 2019	FW	(Cameroon)	Thomas Amang	Gimnàstic	Undisclosed	

† Haaland's move was announced on 18 August 2018 and finalised on 1 January 2019.

=== Loans out ===
Date from	Position	Nationality	Name	to	Date to	Ref.
31 August 2018	FW	(Norway)	Fredrik Brustad	Hamilton Academical	10 January 2019	
22 December 2018	FW	(Norway)	Sivert Gussiås	Strømmen	31 December 2019	
16 January 2019	MF	(Norway)	Tobias Svendsen	Sandefjord	6 July 2019	
16 February 2019	DF	(Norway)	Stian Rode Gregersen	Elfsborg	31 December 2019	
18 February 2019	FW	(Nigeria)	Daniel Chima Chukwu	Heilongjiang Lava Spring	31 December 2019	
24 March 2019	FW	(Cameroon)	Thomas Amang	Kristiansund	26 August 2019	
28 March 2019	GK	(Norway)	Mathias Ranmark	Mjøndalen	5 August 2019	
3 May 2019	DF	(Norway)	Martin Ove Roseth	Sogndal	31 July 2019	
2 August 2019	MF	(Norway)	Tobias Hestad	Asker	End of Season	
20 August 2019	DF	(Norway)	Emil Breivik	Raufoss	31 December 2019	
9 September 2019	DF	(Norway)	Martin Ove Roseth	Sogndal	31 December 2019	
9 September 2019	MF	(Norway)	Tobias Svendsen	Nest-Sotra	31 December 2019	

=== Released ===
Date	Position	Nationality	Name	Joined	Date
30 November 2018	DF	(Sweden)	Isak Ssewankambo	Östersund	21 February 2019
31 December 2018	MF	(Norway)	Petter Strand	Brann	12 January 2019
18 January 2019	MF	(Senegal)	Babacar Sarr	Yenisey Krasnoyarsk	5 February 2019
30 June 2019	DF	(Denmark)	Christoffer Remmer	Westerlo	16 July 2019
26 July 2019	DF	(Sweden)	Christopher Telo	IFK Norrköping	27 July 2019

== Friendlies ==
22 January 2018	CSKA Moscow (Russia)	2–1	(Norway) Molde	Campoamor, Spain
14:00 MSK (UTC+3)	Akhmetov 80'; Nababkin 89'	Report	Chukwu 78'

3 February 2019	Nordsjælland (Denmark)	1–1	(Norway) Molde	Farum, Denmark
14:00 CET (UTC+1)	Gregersen 35' (o.g.)	Report	Gregersen 42'	Stadium: Right to Dream Park

8 February 2019	Molde	2–2	Kristiansund	Molde
18:00 CET (UTC+1)	Knudtzon 14'; James 29'	Report	Coly 11'; Gjesdal 59'	Stadium: Aker Stadion

15 February 2019	Aalesund	0–2	Molde	Ålesund
16:00 CET (UTC+1)		Report	James 2' (pen.); Hestad 83'	Stadium: Color Line Stadion

22 February 2019	Molde (Norway)	3–1	(Estonia) Nõmme Kalju	Marbella, Spain
16:30 CET (UTC+1)	Aursnes 10' (pen.); Knudtzon 42'; Ellingsen 82'	Report	69'	Stadium: Campo La Quinta

26 February 2019	Molde (Norway)	1–1	(Russia) Lokomotiv Moscow	Marbella, Spain
18:00 CEST (UTC+1)	Haugen 84'	Report	Ignatyev 90'	Stadium: Marbella Football Center - Norte 1

1 March 2019	Molde (Norway)	1–2	(Latvia) Ventspils	Marbella, Spain
16:30 CEST (UTC+1)	Remmer 44'	Report	Aiyegun 53' (pen.), 58'	Stadium: Campo La Quinta

12 March 2019	Lillestrøm	1–1	Molde	Lillestrøm
16:00 CET (UTC+1)	Dyer 55'	Report	Bjørnbak 37'	Stadium: LSK-Hallen

17 March 2019	Rosenborg	0–1	Molde	Malvik
16:00 CET (UTC+1)		Report	Hovland 7' (o.g.)	Stadium: Abrahallen; Referee: Ola Hobber Nilsen

24 March 2019	Molde (Norway)	4–1	(Sweden) Östersund	Molde
13:00 CET (UTC+1)	Omoijuanfo 40'; Hestad 45'; Moström 68'; Andersen 90+2'	Report	Tekie 22'	Stadium: Aker Stadion; Referee: Dag Vidar Hafsås

9 June 2019	Molde	3–2	Kristiansund	Molde
??:?? CET (UTC+1)	Knudtzon 3'; James 69'; Forren 85'	Report	Lepistu 26'; Gjesdal 51'	Stadium: Aker Stadion

== Competitions ==
=== Mesterfinalen ===
17 March 2019	Molde	Postponned	Rosenborg	Oslo
16:00 CEST (UTC+2)				Stadium: Ullevaal Stadion
Note: The 2019 Mesterfinalen between Rosenborg and Molde was cancelled on 15 March 2019 due to heavy rain weather forecast on the match date. The Football Association of Norway (NFF) did not want to take risks with the pitch nine days before Norway's Euro 2020 qualifying against Sweden on 26 March 2019. The decision received criticism from manager Erling Moe who questioned NFF's planning.

=== Eliteserien ===
==== Results summary ====
Overall								Home						Away					
Pld	W	D	L	GF	GA	GD	Pts	W	D	L	GF	GA	GD	W	D	L	GF	GA	GD
30	21	5	4	72	31	+41	68	13	2	0	41	10	+31	8	3	4	31	21	+10

Last updated: 1 December 2019.
Source: see below

==== Results by match ====
Match	1	2	3	4	5	6	7	8	9	10	11	12	13	14	15	16	17	18	19	20	21	22	23	24	25	26	27	28	29	30
Ground	A	H	H	A	A	H	A	H	A	H	A	H	A	H	A	H	A	A	H	A	H	A	H	A	H	A	H	H	A	H
Result	D	W	W	L	W	W	W	W	L	W	L	W	W	D	D	W	W	W	D	W	W	W	W	D	W	L	W	W	W	W
Position	7	3	6	4	1	1	1	1	1	1	1	1	1	1	1	1	2	1	2	1	1	1	1	1	1	1	1	1	1	1

Updated to match(es) played on 1 December 2019. Source: see below
A = Away; H = Home; W = Win; D = Draw; L = Loss

==== Results ====
31 March 2019 1	Sarpsborg 08	1–1	Molde	Sarpsborg
18:00 CEST (UTC+2)	Halvorsen (yellow card) 10'; Lindseth 68'	Report	Ellingsen (yellow card) 13'; Moström (yellow card) 87'; Eikrem 90'	Stadium: Sarpsborg Stadion; Attendance: 5,964; Referee: Tore Hansen

7 April 2019 2	Molde	3–0	Stabæk	Molde
18:00 CEST (UTC+2)	Eikrem 32'; Omoijuanfo 38'; Moström 81'	Report	Boli (yellow card) 79'	Stadium: Aker Stadion; Attendance: 6,372; Referee: Tom Harald Hagen

10 April 2019 15	Molde	4–1	Vålerenga	Molde
18:30 CEST (UTC+2)	Omoijuanfo 6'; E.Hestad (yellow card) 14'; Bjørnbak (yellow card) 35'; Eikrem 50' (yellow card) 75'; Andersen 53' (pen.); Linde (yellow card) 62'; Ellingsen 81'	Report	Bjørdal (yellow card) 35'; Adekugbe (yellow card) 52'; Nakkim 60'	Stadium: Aker Stadion; Attendance: 6,202; Referee: Rohit Saggi
Note: The home match against Vålerenga was scheduled on 14 July 2019, but was moved to 10 April 2019 due to Molde's preparation for the Europa League.

14 April 2019 3	Bodø/Glimt	3–2	Molde	Bodø
18:00 CEST (UTC+2)	Saltnes 21'; Reitan (yellow card) 28'; Bergan 38'; Bjørnbak 72' (o.g.)	Report	Haugen (yellow card) 28'; Gabrielsen (yellow card) 43'; Omoijuanfo 83' (pen.); James 86'	Stadium: Aspmyra Stadion; Attendance: 3,240; Referee: Sigurd Kringstad

22 April 2019 4	Lillestrøm	0–2	Molde	Lillestrøm
18:00 CEST (UTC+2)		Report	Eikrem 75'; Knudtzon 85'	Stadium: Åråsen Stadion; Attendance: 5,248; Referee: Svein Oddvar Moen

28 April 2019 5	Molde	3–0	Rosenborg	Molde
20:00 CEST (UTC+2)	Gabrielsen 2'; Haraldseid (yellow card) 7'; Eikrem 13', 27'; Bjørnbak (yellow card) 82'; Moström (yellow card) 89'	Report	Meling (yellow card) 87'	Stadium: Aker Stadion; Attendance: 9,010; Referee: Tore Hansen

5 May 2019 6	Haugesund	1–2	Molde	Haugesund
18:00 CEST (UTC+2)	Samuelsen (yellow card) 24'; Koné 82'; Velde (yellow card) 90+3'	Report	Omoijuanfo 18' (pen.), 51', (yellow card) 90+3'; Forren (yellow card) 34'; Gabrielsen (yellow card) 80'	Stadium: Haugesund Stadion; Attendance: 3,772; Referee: Dag Vidar Hafsås

12 May 2019 7	Molde	1–0	Mjøndalen	Molde
18:00 CEST (UTC+2)	Omoijuanfo (penalty missed) 48'; Haraldseid 61'	Report	Johansen (yellow card) 84'	Stadium: Aker Stadion; Attendance: 6,995; Referee: Trond Ivar Døvle

16 May 2019 8	Kristiansund	3–2	Molde	Kristiansund
18:00 CEST (UTC+2)	Bye 34'; Psyché 41'; Ulvestad (yellow card) 49'; Kalludra 56'; Sørmo (yellow card) 65'	Report	Omoijuanfo 6' (yellow card) 65'; Sjølstad (yellow card) 18'; Bye 31' (o.g.)	Stadium: Kristiansund Stadion; Attendance: 4,444; Referee: Tommy Skjerven

20 May 2019 9	Molde	5–1	Viking	Molde
19:00 CEST (UTC+2)	Omoijuanfo 39', 49' (pen.), 71'; Bjørshol 82' (o.g.)	Report	Høiland 36'	Stadium: Aker Stadion; Attendance: 6,108; Referee: Kristoffer Hagenes

26 May 2019 10	Tromsø	2–1	Molde	Tromsø
18:00 CEST (UTC+2)	Andersen 1'; Taylor 47'; Kongshavn (yellow card) 54'; Ingebrigtsen (red card)	Report	Omoijuanfo (penalty missed) 52'; Bjørnbak (yellow card) 59'; E.Hestad (yellow card) 69'; Gabrielsen 90+4'	Stadium: Alfheim Stadion; Attendance: 2,779; Referee: Trond Ivar Døvle

16 June 2019 11	Molde	2–0	Ranheim	Molde
18:00 CEST (UTC+2)	Eikrem 17'; Knudtzon 66' (yellow card) 67'	Report		Stadium: Aker Stadion; Attendance: 6,625; Referee: Espen Eskås

22 June 2019 12	Strømsgodset	0–4	Molde	Drammen
18:00 CEST (UTC+2)	Keita (yellow card) 58'; Spelmann (yellow card) 67'	Report	Ellingsen 9'; Forren (yellow card) 12'; James 15', 25', 29'; Sjølstad (yellow card) 71'	Stadium: Marienlyst Stadion; Attendance: 5,313; Referee: Ola Hobber Nilsen

30 June 2019 13	Molde	1–1	Brann	Molde
20:00 CEST (UTC+2)	Knudtzon (yellow card) 31'; Aursnes (penalty missed) 58'; James 84' (pen.)	Report	Jenssen 61'	Stadium: Aker Stadion; Attendance: 6,900; Referee: Svein Oddvar Moen

5 July 2019 14	Odd	2–2	Molde	Skien
19:00 CEST (UTC+2)	Nordkvelle 48'; Børven 87'	Report	James 21'; Omoijuanfo 27'; Eikrem (yellow card) 81'	Stadium: Skagerak Arena; Attendance: 6,129; Referee: Ola Hobber Nilsen

21 July 2019 17	Molde	2–1	Sarpsborg 08	Molde
20:00 CEST (UTC+2)	Eikrem 18'; Aursnes (yellow card) 35'; Sjølstad 75'; Haugen (yellow card) 90+5'	Report	Skålevik (yellow card) 44'; Zachariassen 72'	Stadium: Aker Stadion; Attendance: 7,027; Referee: Tommy Skjerven
Note: The home match against Sarpsborg was scheduled to the weekend of 10–12 August 2019, but was moved ahead to 21 July 2019 due to Molde's preparation for the Europa League.

4 August 2019 16	Viking	0–2	Molde	Stavanger
18:00 CEST (UTC+2)	Ibrahimaj (yellow card) 55'; Høiland (yellow card) 90+3'	Report	Ellingsen (yellow card) 41'; Sjølstad (yellow card) 45'; James 82'; Eikrem 86'	Stadium: SR-Bank Arena; Attendance: 7,069; Referee: Tom Harald Hagen

18 August 2019 18	Ranheim	2–3	Molde	Trondheim
18:00 CEST (UTC+2)	Tønne 28'; Solbakken 71'; Blakstad (yellow card) 80'	Report	James 7', 48'; Ellingsen 36'; Moström (yellow card) 63'; Knudtzon (yellow card) 90+5'	Stadium: Extra Arena; Attendance: 2,655; Referee: Ola Hobber Nilsen

25 August 2019 19	Molde	2–2	Odd	Molde
18:00 CEST (UTC+2)	Omoijuanfo (yellow card) 21'; James 42'; E.Hestad 54'; Forren (yellow card) 84'	Report	Børven 24', 69'	Stadium: Aker Stadion; Attendance: 6,843; Referee: Kai Erik Steen

1 September 2019 20	Mjøndalen	1–3	Molde	Mjøndalen
18:00 CEST (UTC+2)	Johansen (yellow card) 30'; Liseth 90+1'; Occéan (yellow card) 90+5'	Report	Omoijuanfo 25'; Knudtzon 55'; Gabrielsen (yellow card) 79'; E.Hestad 90+2'	Stadium: Consto Arena; Attendance: 2,314; Referee: Espen Eskås

15 September 2019 21	Molde	3–0	Tromsø	Molde
18:00 CEST (UTC+2)	Eikrem (yellow card) 37'; James 45'; Bolly 68'; Hussain 84'	Report	Nilsen (yellow card) 82'	Stadium: Aker Stadion; Attendance: 5,952; Referee: Sigurd Smehus Kringstad

23 September 2019 22	Stabæk	1–2	Molde	Bærum
19:00 CEST (UTC+2)	Kassi (yellow card) 8'; Vetlesen (yellow card) 83'; Edvardsen (yellow card) 85'; Amankwah (yellow card) 85'; Brynhildsen 90'; Junker (yellow card) 90+4'	Report	Eikrem (yellow card) 39'; James (yellow card) 45+1'; E.Hestad 53'; Omoijuanfo 69' (yellow card) 80' (yellow-red card) 80'; Aursnes (yellow card) 75'; Haugen (yellow card) 85'	Stadium: Nadderud Stadion; Attendance: 3,915; Referee: Trond Ivar Døvle

29 September 2019 23	Molde	2–1	Lillestrøm	Molde
18:00 CEST (UTC+2)	E.Hestad (yellow card) 51'; James 64'; Salquist 90+4' (o.g.)	Report	Krogstad 37' (pen.); Ødemarksbakken (yellow card) 41'	Stadium: Aker Stadion; Attendance: 6,626; Referee: Rohit Saggi

6 October 2019 24	Brann	0–0	Molde	Bergen
20:00 CEST (UTC+2)		Report		Stadium: Brann Stadion; Attendance: 9,821; Referee: Espen Eskås

20 October 2019 25	Molde	3–1	Haugesund	Molde
18:00 CEST (UTC+2)	Hussain 37', 71'; E.Hestad (yellow card) 41'; Omoijuanfo 73'	Report	Gregor 44'	Stadium: Aker Stadion; Attendance: 6,304; Referee: Ola Hobber Nilsen

27 October 2019 26	Rosenborg	3–1	Molde	Trondheim
20:00 CET (UTC+1)	Søderlund (yellow card) 24' (yellow-red card) 45+1'; David 35'; Hovland 41'; Jensen (yellow card) 57'; Johnsen 82'	Report	Omoijuanfo 13'; Ellingsen (yellow card) 65'; Hussain (yellow card) 90+2'	Stadium: Lerkendal Stadion; Attendance: 14,093; Referee: Tom Harald Hagen

2 November 2019 27	Molde	2–0	Kristiansund	Molde
18:30 CET (UTC+1)	Aursnes 15'; James 59'; Gabrielsen (yellow card) 62'; Linde (yellow card) 89'	Report	Psyché (yellow card) 67'	Stadium: Aker Stadion; Attendance: 8,776; Referee: Kai Erik Steen

10 November 2019 28	Molde	4–0	Strømsgodset	Molde
18:00 CET (UTC+1)	Aursnes (yellow card) 10'; Omoijuanfo 19'; Eikrem 34'; James (yellow card) 46' (goal) 74', 81'; Haugen (yellow card) 52'	Report	Mawa (yellow card) 83'	Stadium: Aker Stadion; Attendance: 7,098; Referee: Kristoffer Hagenes

24 November 2019 29	Vålerenga	2–4	Molde	Oslo
18:00 CET (UTC+1)	Finne 11'; George 56'	Report	E.Hestad 23'; Omoijuanfo (yellow card) 24'; Bolly 31'; Hussain (yellow card) 55' (goal) 81'; Christensen 58'; Eikrem (yellow card) 90'	Stadium: Intility Arena; Attendance: 6,666; Referee: Rohit Saggi

1 December 2019 30	Molde	4–2	Bodø/Glimt	Molde
18:00 CET (UTC+1)	James 8', 87'; Christensen (yellow card) 34'; Bolly 37'; Aursnes (yellow card) 56'; Eikrem 71' (yellow card) 73'; Forren (yellow card) 74'	Report	J.Hauge 59'; Boniface 90'	Stadium: Aker Stadion; Attendance: 7,512; Referee: Espen Eskås

==== Table ====
Pos	Team	Pld	W	D	L	GF	GA	GD	Pts	Qualification or relegation
1	Molde (C)	30	21	5	4	72	31	+41	68	Qualification for the Champions League first qualifying round
2	Bodø/Glimt	30	15	9	6	64	44	+20	54	Qualification for the Europa League first qualifying round
3	Rosenborg	30	14	10	6	53	41	+12	52	Qualification for the Europa League first qualifying round
4	Odd	30	15	7	8	45	40	+5	52	
5	Viking	30	13	8	9	55	42	+13	47	Qualification for the Europa League second qualifying round (Note: Viking qualified for the Europa League second qualifying round as winners of the 2019 Norwegian Cup.)

Source: Football Association of Norway (in Norwegian), Soccerway
Rules for classification: 1) Points; 2) Goal difference; 3) Goals scored; 4) Head-to-head points; 5) Head-to-head goal difference; 6) Head-to-head away goals scored (only if between two teams); 7) Head-to-head goals scored; 8) Play-off (only used to decide champions or relegation).
(C) Champions

=== Norwegian Cup ===
1 May 2019 First Round	Eide/Omegn	0–5	Molde	Eide
18:00 CEST (UTC+2)	O.Halås (yellow card) 42'	Report	James 10', 26'; Andersen 19', 68' (pen.), 72'	Stadium: Eide kunstgressbane Attendance: 1,000; Referee: Mathias Smehus Kringstad

23 May 2019 Second Round	Sunndal	0–4	Molde	Sunndalsøra
18:00 CEST (UTC+2)	P.Melkild (yellow card) 64'; E.Ramsli (yellow card) 77'	Report	Remmer 5'; James 17'; Nyland Ørsahl 37', 38'; M.Eiane (yellow card) 84'	Stadium: Sande Stadion; Attendance: 821; Referee: Mathias Smehus Kringstad

19 June 2019 Third Round	Aalesund	4–0	Molde	Ålesund
20:00 CEST (UTC+2)	Friðjónsson 14', 17'; Fet 55'; Þrándarson 58'; Nenass (yellow card) 84'	Report	Gabrielsen (red card) 30'; E.Hestad (yellow card) 55'; Forren (yellow card) 57'; Moström (yellow card) 68'	Stadium: Color Line Stadion; Attendance: 4,017; Referee: Tom Harald Hagen

=== Europa League ===
==== Qualifying rounds ====
11 July 2019 First qualifying round 1st leg	Molde (Norway)	7–1	(Iceland) KR	Molde, Norway
19:00 CEST (UTC+2)	James 7', 31', 41'; Aursnes 29'; Forren 63'; Hussain 66'; Omoijuanfo 90+3'	Report	Thomsen 71'	Stadium: Aker Stadion; Attendance: 3,756; Referee: Aleksandrs Golubevs (Latvia)

18 July 2019 First qualifying round 2nd leg	KR (Iceland)	0–0 (1–7 agg.)	(Norway) Molde	Reykjavík, Iceland
21:00 CEST (UTC+2)	A.Þórðarson (yellow card) 81'	Report	E.Hestad (yellow card) 90+2'	Stadium: KR-völlur; Attendance: 3,756; Referee: Ian McNabb (Northern Ireland)

25 July 2019 Second qualifying round 1st leg	Molde (Norway)	0–0	(Serbia) Čukarički	Molde, Norway
19:00 CEST (UTC+2)	Aursnes (yellow card) 90+3'	Report	Birmančević (yellow card) 84' (yellow-red card) 90+5'	Stadium: Aker Stadion; Attendance: 3,198; Referee: Donald Robertson (Scotland)

31 July 2019 Second qualifying round 2nd leg	Čukarički (Serbia)	1–3 (1–3 agg.)	(Norway) Molde	Belgrade, Serbia
20:45 CEST (UTC+2)	Stojanović (yellow card) 25'; Kajević 82'	Report	Omoijuanfo 4'; Eikrem 38'; Forren (yellow card) 63'; Craninx (yellow card) 72'; Knudtzon 78'; Ellingsen (yellow card) 90'	Stadium: Čukarički Stadium; Attendance: 3,014; Referee: Mykola Balakin (Ukraine)

8 August 2019 Third qualifying round 1st leg	Molde (Norway)	3–0	(Greece) Aris	Molde, Norway
19:00 CEST (UTC+2)	Eikrem 27'; E.Hestad 32'; Hussain (yellow card) 32'; Ellingsen 87'; Haugen (yellow card) 90'	Report	Vélez (red card) 64'; Delizisis (yellow card) 69'	Stadium: Aker Stadion; Attendance: 3,953; Referee: Maurizio Mariani (Italy)

15 August 2019 Third qualifying round 2nd leg	Aris (Greece)	3–1 (a.e.t.) (3–4 agg.)	(Norway) Molde	Thessaloniki, Greece
20:30 CEST (UTC+2)	Matilla 25' (yellow card) 90+3'; Korhut (yellow card) 33'; Delizisis 37'; Diguiny 85' (yellow card) 118'; Sundgren (yellow card) 90+2'	Report	E.Hestad (yellow card) 24'; Hussain (yellow card) 35'; Eikrem (yellow card) 75'; Omoijuanfo (yellow card) 78'; James (yellow card) 90+2'; Bolly 105+1' (yellow card) 115'	Stadium: Kleanthis Vikelidis Stadium; Referee: Robert Harvey (Ireland)

22 August 2019 Play-off round 1st leg	Partizan (Serbia)	2–1	(Norway) Molde	Belgrade, Serbia
21:00 CEST (UTC+2)	Soumah 45+1'; Zdjelar (yellow card) 71'; Tošić 84'	Report	Bolly 44' (yellow card) 71'; James (yellow card) 50'	Stadium: Partizan Stadium; Attendance: 3,157; Referee: Viktor Kassai (Hungary)

29 August 2019 Play-off round 2nd leg	Molde (Norway)	1–1 (2–3 agg.)	(Serbia) Partizan	Molde, Norway
19:00 CEST (UTC+2)	Forren (yellow card) 32'; Aursnes (yellow card) 41'; James 72'; Hussain (yellow card) 76'	Report	Šehović (yellow card) 1'; Soumah (yellow card) 66'; Miletić 80' (yellow card) 82'; Stojković (yellow card) 90+1'	Stadium: Aker Stadion; Attendance: 7,102; Referee: Ruddy Buquet (France)

== Squad statistics ==
As of match played 1 December 2019

=== Appearances and goals ===
No.	Pos	Nat	Player	Total		Eliteserien		Norwegian Cup		Europa League	
No.	Pos	Nat	Player	Apps	Goals	Apps	Goals	Apps	Goals	Apps	Goals
1	GK	(Sweden) SWE	Andreas Linde	16	0	16	0	0	0	0	0
2	DF	(Norway) NOR	Martin Bjørnbak	33	0	25+1	0	1	0	6	0
4	DF	(Norway) NOR	Ruben Gabrielsen	33	2	25+1	2	1+1	0	5	0
5	DF	(Norway) NOR	Vegard Forren	29	1	16+3	0	3	0	6+1	1
7	MF	(Norway) NOR	Magnus Wolff Eikrem	33	13	20+5	11	1	0	7	2
8	MF	(Norway) NOR	Fredrik Sjølstad	21	1	7+9	1	3	0	0+2	0
9	MF	(Sweden) SWE	Mattias Moström	27	2	7+13	2	2+1	0	1+3	0
10	FW	(Nigeria) NGR	Leke James	38	24	16+12	17	2	3	7+1	4
11	MF	(Norway) NOR	Martin Ellingsen	32	4	22+4	3	0+1	0	1+4	1
12	GK	(Belgium) BEL	Álex Craninx	25	0	14	0	3	0	8	0
14	FW	(Norway) NOR	Erling Knudtzon	29	4	13+7	3	2	0	2+5	1
15	MF	(Norway) NOR	Tobias Christensen	6	1	2+4	1	0	0	0	0
16	MF	(Norway) NOR	Etzaz Hussain	26	5	11+5	4	2	0	8	1
17	MF	(Norway) NOR	Fredrik Aursnes	39	2	30	1	1	0	8	1
18	DF	(Norway) NOR	Kristoffer Haraldseid	36	1	27+1	1	0	0	8	0
19	MF	(Norway) NOR	Eirik Hestad	38	5	24+4	4	1+1	0	7+1	1
20	MF	(United States) USA	Henry Wingo	3	0	0+3	0	0	0	0	0
23	MF	(Norway) NOR	Eirik Ulland Andersen	6	4	3+2	1	1	3	0	0
28	DF	(Norway) NOR	Kristoffer Haugen	27	0	20	0	0	0	7	0
30	MF	(Ivory Coast) CIV	Mathis Bolly	19	5	5+8	3	0	0	1+5	2
46	MF	(Norway) NOR	Tobias Hestad	1	0	0	0	0+1	0	0	0
48	FW	(Norway) NOR	Markus Eiane	1	0	0	0	0+1	0	0	0
50	MF	(Norway) NOR	Jakob Ørsahl	1	2	0	0	1	2	0	0
52	GK	(Norway) NOR	Oliver Petersen	1	0	0	0	0+1	0	0	0
99	FW	(Norway) NOR	Ohi Omoijuanfo	35	17	24+3	15	1	0	5+2	2
Players away from Molde on loan:
25	DF	(Norway) NOR	Martin Ove Roseth	1	0	0	0	1	0	0	0
45	DF	(Norway) NOR	Emil Breivik	3	0	0	0	1+2	0	0	0
Players who appeared for Molde no longer at the club:
3	DF	(Sweden) SWE	Christopher Telo	4	0	1	0	3	0	0	0
22	DF	(Denmark) DEN	Christoffer Remmer	6	1	2+1	0	3	1	0	0

=== Goalscorers ===
Rank	Pos.	No.	Nat.	Player	Eliteserien	Norwegian Cup	Europa League	Total
1	FW	10	(Nigeria)	Leke James	17	3	4	24
2	FW	99	(Norway)	Ohi Omoijuanfo	15	0	2	17
3	MF	7	(Norway)	Magnus Wolff Eikrem	11	0	2	13
4	MF	19	(Norway)	Eirik Hestad	4	0	1	5
4	MF	16	(Norway)	Etzaz Hussain	4	0	1	5
4	MF	30	(Ivory Coast)	Mathis Bolly	3	0	2	5
7	FW	14	(Norway)	Erling Knudtzon	3	0	1	4
7	MF	23	(Norway)	Eirik Ulland Andersen	1	3	0	4
9	MF	11	(Norway)	Martin Ellingsen	3	0	0	3
10	DF	4	(Norway)	Ruben Gabrielsen	2	0	0	2
10	MF	9	(Sweden)	Mattias Moström	2	0	0	2
10	MF	17	(Norway)	Fredrik Aursnes	1	0	1	2
10	FW	50	(Norway)	Jakob Ørsahl	0	2	0	2
14	DF	18	(Norway)	Kristoffer Haraldseid	1	0	0	1
14	MF	8	(Norway)	Fredrik Sjølstad	1	0	0	1
14	MF	15	(Norway)	Tobias Christensen	1	0	0	1
14	DF	22	(Denmark)	Christoffer Remmer	0	1	0	1
14	MF	11	(Norway)	Martin Ellingsen	0	0	1	1
14	DF	5	(Norway)	Vegard Forren	0	0	1	1
				Own goals	3	0	0	3
TOTALS					72	9	16	97

=== Clean sheets ===
Rank	Pos.	No.	Nat.	Player	Eliteserien	Norwegian Cup	Europa League	Total
1	GK	12	(Belgium)	Álex Craninx	4	2	3	9
2	GK	1	(Sweden)	Andreas Linde	7	0	0	7
TOTALS					11	2	3	16

=== Disciplinary record ===
No.	Pos.	Nat.	Name	Eliteserien		Norwegian Cup		Europa League		Total	
No.	Pos.	Nat.	Name	Yellow card	Red card	Yellow card	Red card	Yellow card	Red card	Yellow card	Red card
1	GK	(Sweden)	Andreas Linde	2	0	0	0	0	0	2	0
2	DF	(Norway)	Martin Bjørnbak	3	0	0	0	0	0	3	0
4	DF	(Norway)	Ruben Gabrielsen	4	0	0	1	0	0	4	1
5	DF	(Norway)	Vegard Forren	4	0	1	0	2	0	7	0
7	MF	(Norway)	Magnus Wolff Eikrem	6	0	0	0	1	0	7	0
8	MF	(Norway)	Fredrik Sjølstad	3	0	0	0	0	0	3	0
9	MF	(Sweden)	Mattias Moström	3	0	1	0	0	0	4	0
10	FW	(Nigeria)	Leke James	2	0	0	0	2	0	4	0
11	MF	(Norway)	Martin Ellingsen	3	0	0	0	1	0	4	0
12	GK	(Belgium)	Álex Craninx	0	0	0	0	1	0	1	0
14	FW	(Norway)	Erling Knudtzon	3	0	0	0	0	0	3	0
15	MF	(Norway)	Tobias Christensen	1	0	0	0	0	0	1	0
16	MF	(Norway)	Etzaz Hussain	2	0	0	0	3	0	5	0
17	MF	(Norway)	Fredrik Aursnes	4	0	0	0	2	0	6	0
18	DF	(Norway)	Kristoffer Haraldseid	1	0	0	0	0	0	1	0
19	MF	(Norway)	Eirik Hestad	4	0	1	0	2	0	7	0
28	DF	(Norway)	Kristoffer Haugen	4	0	0	0	1	0	5	0
30	MF	(Ivory Coast)	Mathis Bolly	0	0	0	0	2	0	2	0
99	FW	(Norway)	Ohi Omoijuanfo	5	1	0	0	1	0	7	1
Players away from Molde on loan:
45	DF	(Norway)	Emil Breivik	0	0	1	0	0	0	1	0
Players who appeared for Molde no longer at the club:
TOTALS				55	1	4	1	18	0	77	2

== See also ==
- Molde FK seasons
