= Marcus Holmgren Pedersen =

Norwegian footballer (born 2000)

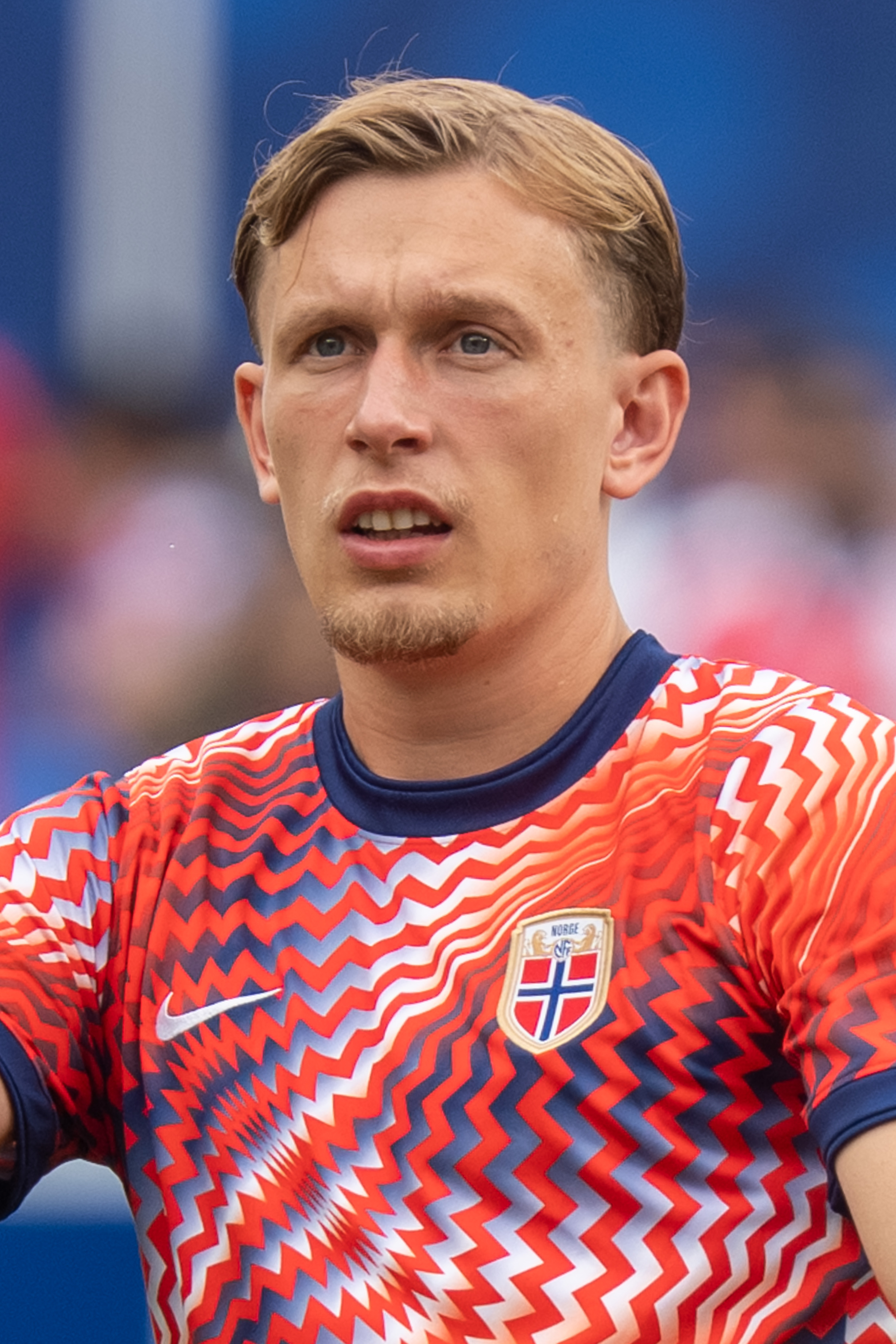
- Pedersen with Norway in 2026

Personal information
- Date of birth: 16 July 2000 (age 26)
- Place of birth: Hammerfest, Norway
- Height: 1.78 m (5 ft 10 in)
- Positions: Right-back; right wing-back

Team information
- Current team: Olympiacos
- Number: 27

Youth career
- –2016: HIF/Stein
- 2016–2018: Tromsø

Senior career*
Years	Team	Apps	(Gls)
2018–2020	Tromsø	20	(0)
2020–2021	Molde	28	(2)
2021–2025	Feyenoord	60	(1)
2023–2024	→ Sassuolo (loan)	28	(0)
2024–2025	→ Torino (loan)	29	(0)
2025–2026	Torino	29	(1)
2026–	Olympiacos	6	(0)

International career^{‡}
2019	Norway U19	9	(1)
2020	Norway U21	2	(0)
2021–	Norway	38	(1)
- * Club domestic league appearances and goals as of 31 October 2026 ‡ National team caps and goals as of 19:58, 14 November 2026 (UTC)

Marcus Holmgren Pedersen (born 16 July 2000) is a Norwegian professional footballer who plays as a right-back for Super League Greece club Olympiacos and the Norway national team.

== Club career ==
=== Early life ===
Hailing from Hammerfest, Pedersen started playing youth football in HIF/Stein. In 2016 he moved to Tromsø to attend the Norwegian School of Elite Sport there, and transferred to the youth section of Tromsø IL.

=== Tromsø ===
Pedersen made his debut for Tromsø when he came in as an 86th-minute substitute in a Norwegian Cup first round tie against Skjervøy on 18 April 2018. He got his league debut in a 1–0 loss against Odd on 28 October 2018, and became the first player from Hammerfest to play in the top division of Norwegian football. On 5 May 2019, he received a red card for a professional foul and was sent off in the 88th minute of the game against Kristiansund.

=== Molde ===
On 11 February 2020, Pedersen signed a three-year contract with Molde.

=== Feyenoord ===
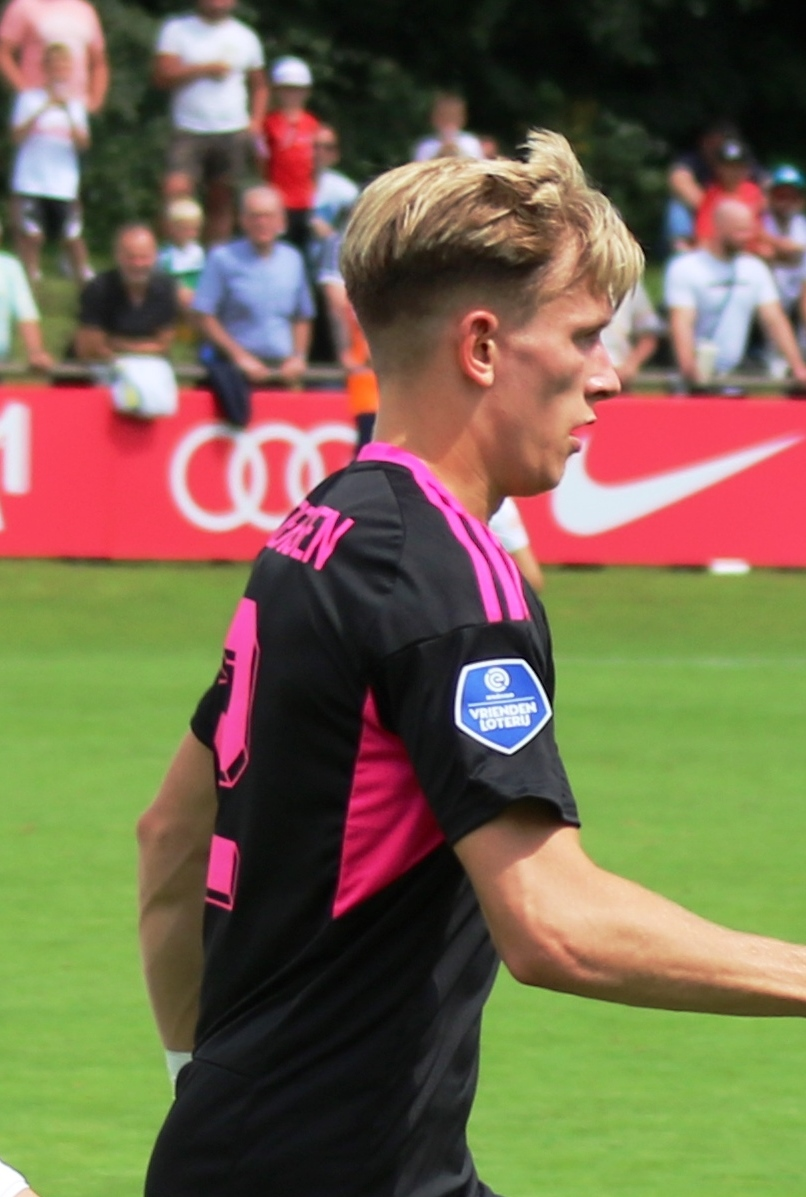
Pedersen playing for Feyenoord in 2022

On 22 June 2021, Molde confirmed that they had sold Holmgren Pedersen to Feyenoord, with the Dutch club confirming the arrival of the defender on a five-year contract the same day. He scored his first goal for the club on 18 February 2023, scoring the second goal in the 90th minute in a 2–1 win over AZ Alkmaar.

==== Sassuolo (loan) ====
On 22 August 2023, Pedersen joined Italian club Sassuolo on loan for the remainder of the season, with an option to buy.

==== Torino (loan) ====
On 22 August 2024, Pedersen returned to Italy and signed with Torino on loan, with an option to buy and a conditional obligation to buy. He scored his first goal for the club in a 2–1 victory over his former club Sassuolo on 8 May 2026.

=== Olympiacos ===
On 27 August 2026, Pedersen signed a 4-year deal with Greek Super League club Olympiacos for a reported transfer fee of €6m with additional €2m in add-ons.

== International career ==
Pedersen played nine games and scored one goal for Norway under-19. On 27 February 2019, he scored in his debut game against Denmark which Norway lost 2–1. Pedersen was a member of Norway's squad in the 2019 European Under-19 Championship and appeared in all three matches in the group stage.

He made his debut for the Norway national football team on 1 September 2021 in a World Cup qualifier against the Netherlands, a 1–1 home draw. He started the game and was substituted after an hour of play.

On 21 May 2026, Pedersen was included in the 26-man squad selected by Norway national team manager Ståle Solbakken for the 2026 FIFA World Cup. On 22 June, he scored his first international goal in a 3–2 victory over Senegal in the World Cup second group-stage match.

== Career statistics ==
=== Club ===
As of match played 4 November 2026

Appearances and goals by club, season and competition
Club	Season	League			National cup		Europe		Other		Total	
Club	Season	Division	Apps	Goals	Apps	Goals	Apps	Goals	Apps	Goals	Apps	Goals
Tromsø	2018	Eliteserien	3	0	2	0	—		—		5	0
Tromsø	2019	Eliteserien	17	0	2	0	—		—		19	0
Tromsø	Total		20	0	4	0	—		—		24	0
Molde	2020	Eliteserien	21	2	0	0	6 (Note: Three appearances in UEFA Champions League, three appearances in UEFA Europa League)	1	—		27	3
Molde	2021	Eliteserien	7	0	0	0	4 (Note: Appearances in UEFA Europa League)	0	—		11	0
Molde	Total		28	2	0	0	10	1	—		38	3
Feyenoord	2021–22	Eredivisie	30	0	1	0	16 (Note: Appearances in UEFA Europa Conference League)	0	—		47	0
Feyenoord	2022–23	Eredivisie	29	1	4	0	7	0	—		40	1
Feyenoord	2023–24	Eredivisie	—		—		—		1 (Note: Appearance in Johan Cruyff Shield)	0	1	0
Feyenoord	2024–25	Eredivisie	1	0	0	0	0	0	—		1	0
Feyenoord	Total		60	1	5	0	23	0	1	0	89	1
Sassuolo (loan)	2023–24	Serie A	28	0	2	0	—		—		30	0
Torino (loan)	2024–25	Serie A	29	0	1	0	—		—		30	0
Torino	2025–26	Serie A	29	1	3	0	—		—		32	1
Torino	Total		58	1	4	0	—		—		62	1
Olympiacos	2026–27	Super League Greece	6	0	2	0	3 (Note: Appearances in UEFA Europa Europa League)	0	—		11	0
Career total			200	4	17	0	36	1	1	0	254	5

=== International ===
As of match played 14 November 2026

Appearances and goals by national team and year
National team	Year	Apps	Goals
Norway	2021	7	0
Norway	2022	9	0
Norway	2023	5	0
Norway	2024	6	0
Norway	2025	3	0
Norway	2026	8	1
Total		38	1

Scores and results list Norway's goal tally first, score column indicates score after each Pedersen goal.

List of international goals scored by Marcus Holmgren Pedersen
No.	Date	Venue	Cap	Opponent	Score	Result	Competition
1	22 June 2026	MetLife Stadium, East Rutherford, United States	33	Senegal	1–0	3–2	2026 FIFA World Cup

== Honours ==
Feyenoord

- Eredivisie: 2022–23
- UEFA Europa Conference League runner-up: 2021–22
