= Martin Ellingsen =

Norwegian footballer (born 1995)

Personal information
- Full name: Martin Skjelbreid Ellingsen
- Date of birth: 4 May 1995 (age 31)
- Place of birth: Elverum, Norway
- Height: 1.80 m (5 ft 11 in)
- Position: Midfielder

Team information
- Current team: AIK
- Number: 6

Youth career
- 2011: Elverum
- 2012: Kongsvinger

Senior career*
Years	Team	Apps	(Gls)
2013–2017	Kongsvinger	117	(17)
2017–2023	Molde	82	(13)
2024–	AIK	1	(0)
- * Club domestic league appearances and goals as of 24 October 2026

Martin Ellingsen (born 4 May 1995) is a Norwegian professional footballer who plays as a midfielder for Allsvenskan club AIK.

== Club career ==
=== Kongsvinger ===
Ellingsen made his debut for Kongsvinger on 7 April 2013, in a 1. divisjon game Kongsvinger won 1–0 against Mjøndalen. On 1 May 2013, he scored his first goal for the club in the Norwegian Cup second round game against Raufoss. Ellingsen made 138 appearances for Kongsvinger and scored 21 goals in all competitions.

=== Molde ===
On 11 August 2017, Ellingsen joined Molde FK from Kongsvinger, having previously already agreed to join the club in December 2017. He signed a three-year contract with the club.

Ellingsen made his Molde debut on 20 August 2017 in an Eliteserien away game Molde lost 3–2 against Stabæk. On 17 September 2017, he scored his first goal for the club in Molde's 3–2 win against Viking. He got his debut in UEFA competitions on 18 July 2019 in Molde's 0–0 away draw against KR in the 2019–20 UEFA Europa League first qualifying round. On 27 November 2019, Molde announced that Ellingsen had agreed to a contract that will keep him at the club until the end of the 2022 season. In the 2020–21 UEFA Europa League he scored a goal against Arsenal in a group stage fixture.

=== AIK ===
On 31 December 2023, Allsvenskan club AIK announced the signing of Ellingsen on a contract until 31 December 2026.

== Career statistics ==
=== Club ===
As of match played 24 October 2026

Appearances and goals by club, season and competition
Club	Season	League			National Cup		Continental		Other		Total	
Club	Season	Division	Apps	Goals	Apps	Goals	Apps	Goals	Apps	Goals	Apps	Goals
Kongsvinger	2013	1. divisjon	29	2	3	1	—		—		32	3
Kongsvinger	2014	2. divisjon	20	3	3	0	—		—		23	3
Kongsvinger	2015	2. divisjon	23	4	3	0	—		—		26	4
Kongsvinger	2016	1. divisjon	29	5	7	3	—		2 (Note: Appearances in Eliteserien play-offs)	0	38	8
Kongsvinger	2017	1. divisjon	16	3	3	0	—		—		17	3
Kongsvinger	Total		117	17	19	4	—	—	2	0	138	21
Molde	2017	Eliteserien	11	2	2	1	—		—		13	3
Molde	2018	Eliteserien	0	0	0	0	0	0	—		0	0
Molde	2019	Eliteserien	26	3	1	0	5	1	—		32	4
Molde	2020	Eliteserien	27	5	0	0	11	3	—		38	8
Molde	2021	Eliteserien	7	2	0	0	3	1	—		10	3
Molde	2022	Eliteserien	0	0	0	0	0	0	—		0	0
Molde	2023	Eliteserien	11	1	2	0	10	1	—		23	2
Molde	Total		82	13	5	1	29	6	—	—	116	20
AIK	2024	Allsvenskan	0	0	3	0	—		—		3	0
AIK	2025	Allsvenskan	0	0	0	0	—		—		0	0
AIK	2026	Allsvenskan	1	0	0	0	—		—		1	0
AIK	Total		1	0	3	0	0	0	—	—	4	0
Career total			200	30	27	2	29	6	2	0	258	38

== Honours ==
Molde

- Eliteserien: 2019
- Norwegian Cup: 2023
