= Voll IL =

Norwegian sports club

- Full name: Voll Idrettslag
- Founded: 11 June 1969
- Ground: Voll stadion, Voll
- League: Fourth Division
Home colours

Voll Idrettslag is a Norwegian sports club from Voll, Rogaland. It has sections for association football, team handball, ice hockey, badminton and gymnastics.

It was established on 11 June 1969.

The men's football team currently plays in the Fourth Division, the fifth tier of Norwegian football. It last played in the Third Division in 1993.
