= 2025 Tromsø IL season =

Tromsø
2025 season
- Chairman: Stig Bjørklund
- Head coach: Jørgen Vik
- Stadium: Romssa Arena
- Eliteserien: 3rd
- 2025 Norwegian Cup: Third Round
- 2025–26 Norwegian Cup: Advanced to Fourth Round
- Top goalscorer: League: Ieltsin Camões (13); All: Ieltsin Camões (13)
- Highest home attendance: 6,691 (vs. Bodø/Glimt, Eliteserien, 16 May 2025)
- Lowest home attendance: 1,104 (vs. Kristiansund, Norwegian Cup, 24 September 2025)
- Average home league attendance: 4,958
- Biggest win: 10–0 vs Hamna (A); Norwegian Cup, 13 April 2025
- Biggest defeat: 1–4 vs Rosenborg (A); Eliteserien, 27 July 2025
| Home colours | Away colours |

The 2025 season was Tromsø IL's 105th season in existence and the club's fifth consecutive season in the top flight of Norwegian football. In addition to the domestic league, Tromsø participated in both the 2025 and 2025–26 editions of the Norwegian Cup. Prior to the start of the season the club announced that joint head coach Gard Holme would leave the club, leaving Jørgen Vik alone in charge as head coach.

The season started poorly for Tromsø who won only one of their five first games in the Eliteserien, while also being eliminated from the Norwegian Cup in the third round. After the loss in the cup the club turned things around, stringing together a run of nine wins in a row through the summer months. The latter half of the season was mixed, although a strong finish to the season secured a third place in the standings, also earning Tromsø a qualifying spot in the UEFA Europa League the next season.

== Season events ==
The start of the year saw joint head coach Gard Holme and the club mutually agree that Holme would leave the club, leaving Jørgen Vik as the sole head coach for the 2025 season. A week later, the club announced the appointment of Stjørdals-Blink's head coach Marius Jacobsen, as their new assistant coach. This season also marked the first time since the 2013 season that Lasse Nilsen didn't play for the club, as his contract expired after the 2024 season.

Tromsø's season started poorly, with only one win against Haugesund from their first five games in the Eliteserien, in addition to being knocked out of the 2025 Norwegian Cup by KFUM Oslo in the third round. Three days later they again played KFUM Oslo, this time in the Eliteserien, winning 3–1 and turning the momentum of the season around. The next three games were won by the club, including a win at home against rivals and reigning champions Bodø/Glimt. As Tromsø beat HamKam away on 22 June, they tied their record of five wins in a row, before beating the record a week later against Fredrikstad.

On 5 July, Tromsø played Molde at home in what was dubbed the "Midnight Sun Match", being played close to midnight to highlight the midnight sun in the Arctic where the club is based. The match ended 1–0 to Tromsø, after Molde player Caleb Zady Sery was sent off right before half-time. Tromsø would go on to win their next two games, extending their win streak to nine wins in a row, before finally losing away to Rosenborg in a 4–1 thrashing at Lerkendal Stadion.

Days later, as part of the Norwegian summer transfer window, Tromsø signed Swedish wing-back Alexander Warneryd from Västerås SK. With a reported price tag of around 8,000,000 NOK, Warneryd became the most expensive signing by Tromsø in their history, beating the previous record set by Frederik Christensen. After their defeat to Rosenborg, Tromsø's form worsened, and they did not win any of their next four games. This was followed by a better period by the club, with four wins for the club in late August and September, while also beating Kristiansund in the newly reworked 2025–26 Norwegian Cup.

October started with two losses for Tromsø, against both Vålerenga and Viking, before bouncing back with a win at home against already relegated Haugesund. Then, on 2 November, after their win against Sarpsborg 08, Tromsø secured at least a fourth place in the Eliteserien, also granting them a European qualification spot for the next season. Tromsø's penultimate game was a 1–0 win against Rosenborg where Ruben Yttergård Jenssen scored the winning goal. The win also saw Tromsø overtake Brann in the league table, now sitting 3rd ahead of the final game. Ahead of the game, the club honoured Vegard Erlien, Anders Jenssen, Ruben Kristiansen, and Simon Thomas while also confirming that they would leave the club at the end of the season.

Before the final matchday both Tromsø and Brann could end up third in the standings, but only Tromsø had fate in their own hands. As long as Tromsø won against Kristiansund they would hold onto their 3rd place no matter how the Brann game ended. Brann would go on to win their game, but a 3–1 win for Tromsø meant that they would finish 3rd for their second time in three years, which also included a spot for the second qualifying round of the 2026–27 UEFA Europa League. The game against Kristiansund also marked Yttergård Jenssen's 400th game for the club, the second most for any Tromsø player.

== Coaching team ==
As of 13 January 2025

| Position | Name |
|---|---|
| Head coach | (Norway) Jørgen Vik |
| Assistant coaches | (Norway) Ola Rismo, (Norway) Marius Jacobsen, (Norway) Lars Gunnar Johnsen |
| Goalkeeping coach | (Norway) Eirik Sørensen |
| Fitness coach | (Norway) Sigurd Pedersen |

== Squad ==
As of 22 December 2025

| No. | Player | Nationality | Date of birth (age) | Signed from | Signed in | Contract ends | Apps | Goals |
Goalkeepers
| 1 | Jakob Haugaard | (Denmark) | 1 May 1992 (aged 33) | (Sweden) AIK | 2022 | 2026 | 121 | 0 |
| 12 | Simon Thomas | (Canada) | 12 April 1990 (aged 35) | Unattached | 2021 | 2025 | 15 | 0 |
| 27 | Ole Kristian Lauvli | (Norway) | 13 May 1994 (aged 31) | (Norway) Raufoss | 2025 | 2026 | 4 | 0 |
Defenders
| 2 | Leo Cornic | (Norway) | 2 January 2001 (aged 24) | (Norway) Rosenborg | 2024 | 2027 | 43 | 8 |
| 4 | Vetle Skjærvik | (Norway) | 15 September 2000 (aged 25) | (Norway) Lillestrøm | 2024 | 2027 | 64 | 3 |
| 5 | Anders Jenssen | (Norway) | 10 October 1993 (aged 32) | (Norway) Tromsdalen | 2019 | 2025 | 179 | 7 |
| 21 | Tobias Guddal | (Norway) | 25 July 2002 (aged 23) | (Norway) Bryne | 2024 | 2028 | 63 | 1 |
| 23 | Jens Husebø | (Norway) | 7 March 1999 (aged 26) | (Norway) Bryne | 2025 | 2027 | 4 | 0 |
| 24 | Ruben Kristiansen | (Norway) | 20 February 1988 (aged 37) | (Norway) Brann | 2025 | 2025 | 81 | 1 |
| 25 | Abubacarr Sedi Kinteh | (The Gambia) | 30 November 2006 (aged 19) | (Senegal) Academy Mawade Wade | 2025 | 2029 | 25 | 1 |
| 29 | Alexander Warneryd | (Sweden) | 21 August 2005 (aged 20) | (Sweden) Västerås SK | 2025 | 2029 | 14 | 1 |
| 30 | Isak Vådebu | (Norway) | 10 August 2003 (aged 22) | (Norway) Tromsdalen | 2023 | 2029 | 26 | 0 |
Midfielders
| 6 | Jens Hjertø-Dahl | (Norway) | 31 October 2005 (aged 20) | (Norway) Academy | 2022 | 2027 | 87 | 12 |
| 11 | Ruben Yttergård Jenssen (captain) | (Norway) | 4 May 1988 (aged 37) | (Norway) Brann | 2020 | 2026 | 400 | 19 |
| 14 | Sigurd Prestmo | (Norway) | 6 October 2006 (aged 19) | (Norway) Ranheim | 2025 | 2028 | 6 | 0 |
| 19 | Aleksander Lilletun Elvebu | (Norway) | 22 March 2009 (aged 16) | (Norway) Academy | 2025 | 2028 | 0 | 0 |
| 20 | David Edvardsson | (Sweden) | 5 March 2002 (aged 23) | (Sweden) Malmö FF | 2024 | Undisclosed | 41 | 4 |
| 34 | Mads Mikkelsen | (Norway) | 28 August 2008 (aged 17) | (Norway) Academy | 2024 | 2028 | 1 | 0 |
| 35 | Johan Solstad-Nøis | (Norway) | 30 January 2008 (aged 17) | (Norway) Academy | 2024 | 2028 | 2 | 0 |
| 37 | Sander Innvær | (Norway) | 11 October 2004 (aged 21) | (Norway) Haugesund | 2025 | 2029 | 2 | 0 |
Forwards
| 7 | Lars Olden Larsen | (Norway) | 17 September 1998 (aged 27) | (Netherlands) NEC | 2025 | 2025 | 13 | 3 |
| 9 | Ieltsin Camões | (Portugal) | 16 April 1999 (aged 26) | (Sweden) IK Brage | 2025 | 2027 | 27 | 13 |
| 15 | Vegard Erlien | (Norway) | 26 June 1998 (aged 27) | (Norway) Ranheim | 2023 | 2025 | 91 | 37 |
| 17 | August Mikkelsen | (Norway) | 24 October 2000 (aged 25) | (Norway) Bodø/Glimt | 2025 | 2025 | 91 | 17 |
| 18 | Daniel Braut | (Norway) | 1 May 2005 (aged 20) | (Norway) Sandnes Ulf | 2025 | 2028 | 33 | 10 |
| 36 | Johannes Lilletun Elvebu | (Norway) | 4 July 2007 (aged 18) | (Norway) Academy | 2025 | 2026 | 0 | 0 |

=== New contracts ===
| Date | Pos. | No. | Player | Until | Ref. |
|---|---|---|---|---|---|
| 15 January 2025 | MF | 7 | (Norway) Yaw Paintsil | 2027 | |
| 25 March 2025 | MF | 10 | (Norway) Jakob Napoleon Romsaas | 2028 | |
| 18 July 2025 | FW | 36 | (Norway) Johannes Lilletun Elvebu | 2026 | |
| 19 September 2025 | MF | 11 | (Norway) Ruben Yttergård Jenssen | 2026 | |
| 28 October 2025 | DF | 30 | (Norway) Isak Vådebu | 2029 | |
| 6 November 2025 | MF | 19 | (Norway) Aleksander Lilletun Elvebu | 2028 | |
| 8 December 2025 | MF | 35 | (Norway) Johan Solstad-Nøis | 2028 | |
| 10 December 2025 | MF | 34 | (Norway) Mads Mikkelsen | 2028 | |

== Transfers ==
=== In ===
| Date | Pos. | No. | Player | From | Fee | Ref. |
|---|---|---|---|---|---|---|
| 1 January 2025 | DF | 17 | (Romania) Filip Oprea | (Norway) Kjelsås | Undisclosed | |
| 1 January 2025 | DF | 24 | (Norway) Ruben Kristiansen | (Norway) Brann | Free transfer | |
| 2 February 2025 | MF | 14 | (Norway) Sigurd Prestmo | (Norway) Ranheim | Undisclosed | |
| 12 February 2025 | FW | 9 | (Portugal) Ieltsin Camões | (Sweden) IK Brage | Undisclosed | |
| 28 February 2025 | GK | 27 | (Norway) Ole Kristian Lauvli | (Norway) Raufoss | Undisclosed | |
| 5 March 2025 | DF | 25 | (The Gambia) Abubacarr Sedi Kinteh | (Senegal) Academy Mawade Wade | Undisclosed | |
| 18 June 2025 | FW | 18 | (Norway) Daniel Braut | (Norway) Sandnes Ulf | Undisclosed | |
| 1 August 2025 | DF | 29 | (Sweden) Alexander Warneryd | (Sweden) Västerås SK | €660,000 | |
| 28 August 2025 | MF | 37 | (Norway) Sander Innvær | (Norway) Haugesund | Undisclosed | |
| 4 September 2025 | DF | 23 | (Norway) Jens Husebø | (Norway) Bryne | Free transfer | |

=== Out ===
| Date | Pos. | No. | Player | To | Fee | Ref. |
|---|---|---|---|---|---|---|
| 31 December 2024 | DF | 25 | (Norway) Lasse Nilsen | (Norway) Tromsdalen | Released | |
| 31 December 2024 | FW | 27 | (Senegal) Yoro Ba | (Senegal) Académie Bloc 16 | Undisclosed | |
| 31 December 2024 | DF | 28 | (France) Christophe Psyché | Retired | | |
| 31 December 2024 | DF | – | (Norway) Oskar Opsahl | Released | | |
| 20 January 2025 | DF | – | (The Gambia) Dadi Gaye | (Norway) Bryne | Undisclosed | |
| 27 January 2025 | DF | 14 | (Senegal) Mamadou Thierno Barry | (Belgium) Union Saint-Gilloise | €2,500,000 | |
| 3 February 2025 | FW | 9 | (Norway) Lasse Nordås | (England) Luton Town | €3,300,000 | |
| 14 February 2025 | MF | 18 | (Norway) Markus Johnsgård | (Norway) HamKam | Undisclosed | |
| 13 June 2025 | MF | 10 | (Norway) Jakob Napoleon Romsaas | (Belgium) Charleroi | €1,500,000 | |
| 4 July 2025 | DF | 3 | (Norway) Jesper Robertsen | (Norway) Hødd | Undisclosed | |
| 24 July 2025 | MF | 7 | (Norway) Yaw Paintsil | (Norway) Lillestrøm | Undisclosed | |
| 20 August 2025 | FW | – | (Norway) Elias Aarflot | (Norway) Tromsdalen | Released | |
| 27 August 2025 | MF | 23 | (Norway) Runar Norheim | (Denmark) Nordsjælland | €2,500,000 | |

=== Loans in ===
| Date | Pos. | No. | Player | From | Date until | Ref. |
|---|---|---|---|---|---|---|
| 24 February 2025 | FW | 18 | (Norway) Daniel Braut | (Norway) Sandnes Ulf | 18 June 2025 (Note: On 18 June 2025, Braut was bought by the club, ending the loan spell.) | |
| 27 March 2025 | FW | 17 | (Norway) August Mikkelsen | (Norway) Bodø/Glimt | End of season | |
| 22 August 2025 | FW | 7 | (Norway) Lars Olden Larsen | (Netherlands) NEC | End of season | |

=== Loans out ===
| Date | Pos. | No. | Player | To | Date until | Ref. |
|---|---|---|---|---|---|---|
| 28 January 2025 | FW | – | (Norway) Elias Aarflot | (Norway) Raufoss | 19 August 2025 (Note: On 19 August, Aarflot was recalled from his loan at Raufoss.) | |
| 11 February 2025 | DF | 26 | (Norway) Isak Vik | (Norway) Mjøndalen | End of season | |
| 13 March 2025 | DF | – | (Romania) Filip Oprea | (Norway) Egersund | 30 June 2025 | |
| 27 March 2025 | MF | 19 | (Norway) Heine Åsen Larsen | (Norway) Bryne | 8 July 2025 (Note: On 8 July 2025, Åsen Larsen was recalled from his loan at Bryne.) | |
| 27 March 2025 | FW | 29 | (Norway) Sean Nilsen-Modebe | (Norway) Tromsdalen | End of season (Note: On 31 July 2025, Nilsen-Modebe's loan was extended until the end of the season.) | |
| 28 March 2025 | DF | 16 | (Finland) Miika Koskela | (Finland) AC Oulu | 28 July 2025 (Note: On 21 July 2025, Koskela's loan was extended until 28 July 2025.) | |
| 28 March 2025 | DF | – | (Norway) Tobias Norbye | (Norway) Alta | End of season | |
| 26 April 2025 | DF | 30 | (Norway) Isak Vådebu | (Norway) Åsane | 3 July 2025 (Note: On 3 July 2025, Vådebu was recalled from his loan at Åsane.) | |
| 28 May 2025 | DF | 3 | (Norway) Jesper Robertsen | (Norway) Hødd | 30 June 2025 | |
| 17 June 2025 | FW | 22 | (Denmark) Frederik Christensen | (Germany) FC Ingolstadt | 30 June 2026 | |
| 6 July 2025 | GK | 32 | (Norway) Mats Trige | (Norway) Tromsdalen | End of season | |
| 13 July 2025 | MF | 35 | (Norway) Casper Kleiva | (Norway) Alta | End of season | |
| 24 July 2025 | DF | – | (Romania) Filip Oprea | (Norway) Åsane | End of season | |
| 2 August 2025 | DF | 16 | (Finland) Miika Koskela | (Norway) Haugesund | End of season | |
| 21 August 2025 | MF | 19 | (Norway) Heine Åsen Larsen | (Norway) Bryne | End of season | |
| 23 August 2025 | MF | 8 | (Norway) Kent-Are Antonsen | (Sweden) IFK Värnamo | End of season | |

== Pre-season and friendlies ==
On 27 December 2024, Tromsø announced their plans of heading to Spain in late January for their first training camp of the pre-season, as well as games against Ukrainian side Kryvbas Kryvyi Rih and Sogndal. At the same time, they also announced that they would return to Spain around a month later for their second camp, with games against Brann and Aalesund. The final friendly match before the season began was a home match against HamKam.

| 28 January 2025 Friendly | Tromsø (Norway) | 1–1 | (Ukraine) Kryvbas Kryvyi Rih | Orihuela, Spain |
| 16:00 CET (UTC+1) | Oprea 88' | Report | Ilić 77' (pen.) | Stadium: Nuevo Campo Del Campoamor Golf Resort |

| 4 February 2025 Friendly | Sogndal | 1–2 | Tromsø | Orihuela, Spain |
| 16:00 CET (UTC+1) | Flataker 39' (pen.) | Report | Cornic 44'; Paintsil 90' | Stadium: Nuevo Campo Del Campoamor Golf Resort |

| 13 February 2025 Friendly | Sarpsborg 08 | 3–3 | Tromsø | Lillestrøm |
| 14:00 CET (UTC+1) | Sandberg 22'; Håheim-Elveseter 57'; Guðjohnsen 70' | Report | Erlien 25'; Hjertø-Dahl 43'; Norheim 86' | Stadium: LSK-Hallen |

| 22 February 2025 Friendly | Tromsø | 3–1 | Tromsdalen | Tromsø |
| 13:00 CET (UTC+1) | | Report | | Stadium: Romssa Arena |

| 2 March 2025 Friendly | Brann | 1–0 | Tromsø | San Pedro Alcántara, Spain |
| 18:00 CET (UTC+1) | Horn Myhre 30', (yellow card) 69'; Knudsen (yellow card) 45+1'; Kornvig (yellow card) 60' | Report | Skjærvik (yellow card) 6' | Stadium: Marbella football center |

| 8 March 2025 Friendly | Tromsø | 0–1 | Aalesund | San Pedro Alcántara, Spain |
| 15:00 CET (UTC+1) | | Report | Heiselberg 29' | Stadium: Marbella football center |

| 15 March 2025 Friendly | Vålerenga | 1–4 | Tromsø | Oslo |
| 15:00 CET (UTC+1) | Hagen 77' | Report | Hjertø-Dahl 45'; Erlien 59'; Antonsen 74'; Braut 89' | Stadium: Intility Arena |

| 22 March 2025 Friendly | Tromsø | 2–0 | HamKam | Tromsø |
| 14:00 CET (UTC+1) | Camões 17'; Åsen Larsen 84' | Report | | Stadium: Romssa Arena |

| 16 June 2025 Friendly | Häcken (Sweden) | 1–0 | (Norway) Tromsø | Sarpsborg |
| 13:00 CEST (UTC+2) | Nioule 1' | Report | | Stadium: Sarpsborg Stadion |

== Competitions ==
=== Overview ===
| Competition | First match | Last match | Starting round | Final position | Record | | | | | | | |
| Competition | First match | Last match | Starting round | Final position | Pld | W | D | L | GF | GA | GD | Win % |
|---|---|---|---|---|---|---|---|---|---|---|---|---|
| Eliteserien | 30 March 2025 | 30 November 2025 | Matchday 1 | 3rd | 30 | 18 | 3 | 9 | 50 | 36 | +14 | 60.00 |
| 2025 Norwegian Cup | 13 April 2025 | 8 May 2025 | First round | Third round | 3 | 2 | 0 | 1 | 11 | 1 | +10 | 66.67 |
| 2025–26 Norwegian Cup | 24 September 2025 | See 2026 season | Third Round | See 2026 season | 1 | 1 | 0 | 0 | 2 | 1 | +1 | 100.00 |
| Total | | | | | 34 | 21 | 3 | 10 | 63 | 38 | +25 | 61.76 |

Source: Soccerway

=== Eliteserien ===
==== League table ====
| Pos | Team | Pld | W | D | L | GF | GA | GD | Pts | Qualification or relegation |
|---|---|---|---|---|---|---|---|---|---|---|
| 1 | Viking (C) | 30 | 22 | 5 | 3 | 77 | 36 | +41 | 71 | Qualification for the Champions League play-off round |
| 2 | Bodø/Glimt | 30 | 22 | 4 | 4 | 85 | 28 | +57 | 70 | Qualification for the Champions League third qualifying round (Note: Bodø/Glimt, as one of the two clubs with the highest club coefficient that would otherwise have entered the League Path second qualifying round, entered the League Path third qualifying round due to the rebalancing of the default access list.) |
| 3 | Tromsø | 30 | 18 | 3 | 9 | 50 | 36 | +14 | 57 | Qualification for the Europa League second qualifying round (Note: Lillestrøm from the 2025 Norwegian First Division qualified for the Europa League play-off round as winners of the 2025 Norwegian Football Cup.) |
| 4 | Brann | 30 | 17 | 5 | 8 | 55 | 46 | +9 | 56 | Qualification for the Conference League second qualifying round |
| 5 | Sandefjord | 30 | 15 | 3 | 12 | 55 | 42 | +13 | 48 | |

Source: Football Association of Norway (in Norwegian)
Rules for classification: 1) Points; 2) Goal difference; 3) Goals scored; 4) Head-to-head points; 5) Head-to-head goal difference; 6) Head-to-head goals scored.
(C) Champions

==== Results summary ====
| Overall | | | | | | | | Home | | | | | | Away | | | | | |
| Pld | W | D | L | GF | GA | GD | Pts | W | D | L | GF | GA | GD | W | D | L | GF | GA | GD |
|---|---|---|---|---|---|---|---|---|---|---|---|---|---|---|---|---|---|---|---|
| 30 | 18 | 3 | 9 | 50 | 36 | +14 | 57 | 10 | 1 | 4 | 24 | 13 | +11 | 8 | 2 | 5 | 26 | 23 | +3 |

==== Results by round ====
| Round | 1 | 2 | 3 | 4 | 5 | 6 | 7 | 8 | 9 | 10 | 11 | 12 | 13 | 14 | 15 | 16 | 17 | 18 | 19 | 20 | 21 | 22 | 23 | 24 | 25 | 26 | 27 | 28 | 29 | 30 |
|---|---|---|---|---|---|---|---|---|---|---|---|---|---|---|---|---|---|---|---|---|---|---|---|---|---|---|---|---|---|---|
| Ground | H | A | H | A | H | A | H | A | H | A | A | H | A | H | A | H | A | H | A | H | A | H | H | A | H | A | H | A | H | A |
| Result | W | L | L | D | L | W | W | W | W | W | W | W | W | W | L | D | D | L | L | W | W | W | W | L | L | W | W | L | W | W |
| Position | 7 | 12 | 13 | 11 | 12 | 10 | 9 | 7 | 5 | 4 | 4 | 3 | 2 | 2 | 2 | 3 | 4 | 4 | 4 | 4 | 4 | 4 | 4 | 4 | 4 | 4 | 4 | 4 | 3 | 3 |

A = Away; H = Home; W = Win; D = Draw; L = Loss

==== Matches ====
The league fixtures were announced on 20 December 2024.

Win Draw Loss Fixtures

| 30 March 2025 1 | Tromsø | 1–0 | Haugesund | Tromsø |
| 17:00 CEST (UTC+2) | Romsaas (yellow card) 16'; Erlien 37' (pen.) | Report | Krusnell (yellow card) 22' | Stadium: Romssa Arena; Attendance: 4,324; Referee: Sigurd Smehus Kringstad |

| 6 April 2025 2 | Brann | 3–1 | Tromsø | Bergen |
| 14:30 CEST (UTC+2) | Heggebø 62', 78'; Castro 74' (pen.) | Report | Skjærvik (yellow card) 17'; Yttergård Jenssen 34'; Mikkelsen (yellow card) 52' | Stadium: Brann Stadion; Attendance: 16,557; Referee: Ola Hobber Nilsen |

| 20 April 2025 3 | Tromsø | 2–3 | Kristiansund | Tromsø |
| 14:30 CEST (UTC+2) | Romsaas (yellow card) 16', (goal) 37'; Skjærvik (yellow card) 50'; Camões 90+5' | Report | Corlu (yellow card) 26'; Kilen 57', 73', 88', (yellow card) 89'; Flex (yellow card) 90' | Stadium: Romssa Arena; Attendance: 3,632; Referee: Stian Røvig Sletner |

| 27 April 2025 4 | Viking | 4–4 | Tromsø | Stavanger |
| 19:15 CEST (UTC+2) | Hansen (yellow card) 32'; Bell (yellow card) 42'; Heggheim 53'; Austbø 57'; Haugen 90+4'; Roseth 90+7' | Report | Erlien 10', 49', 90+8'; Guddal (yellow card) 19'; Haugaard (yellow card) 45'; Hjertø-Dahl 55'; Paintsil (yellow card) 82'; Cornic (yellow card) 86' | Stadium: Viking Stadion; Attendance: 10,151; Referee: Marius Hansen Grøtta |

| 4 May 2025 5 | Tromsø | 0–1 | Sandefjord | Tromsø |
| 17:00 CEST (UTC+2) | Jenssen (yellow card) 37'; Edvardsson (yellow card) 85' | Report | Sigurðarson 62'; Mettler (yellow card) 81'; Smajlović (yellow card) 90+4' (yellow-red card) 90+5' | Stadium: Romssa Arena; Attendance: 4,060; Referee: Rohit Saggi |

| 11 May 2025 6 | KFUM Oslo | 1–3 | Tromsø | Oslo |
| 17:00 CEST (UTC+2) | Nuñez 1'; Tønnessen (yellow card) 45+3' | Report | Skjærvik 6'; Kinteh (yellow card) 79'; Camões 90+2'; Antonsen 90+4' | Stadium: KFUM Arena; Attendance: 2,157; Referee: Eivind Bodding |

| 16 May 2025 7 | Tromsø | 2–1 | Bodø/Glimt | Tromsø |
| 18:00 CEST (UTC+2) | Skjærvik (yellow card) 28', (goal) 90+3'; Antonsen (yellow card) 40'; Cornic 57'; Guddal (yellow card) 84'; Hjertø-Dahl (yellow card) 90+8' | Report | Bjørkan (yellow card) 28'; Høgh 39'; Hauge (yellow card) 90+8' | Stadium: Romssa Arena; Attendance: 6,691; Referee: Daniel Higraff |

| 25 May 2025 8 | Sarpsborg 08 | 0–1 | Tromsø | Sarpsborg |
| 17:00 CEST (UTC+2) | Håheim-Elveseter (yellow card) 28'; Sanyang (yellow card) 39'; Tangen (yellow card) 70' | Report | Edvardsson (yellow card) 45+1'; Camões 74' | Stadium: Sarpsborg Stadion; Attendance: 4,330; Referee: Sivert Øksnes Amland |

| 31 May 2025 9 | Tromsø | 2–1 | Vålerenga | Tromsø |
| 18:45 CEST (UTC+2) | Edvardsson (yellow card) 22', (goal) 52'; Skjærvik (yellow card) 66'; Erlien 68'; Kinteh (yellow card) 71' | Report | Nogueira (yellow card) 54'; Ambina (yellow card) 63'; Sørensen 67' | Stadium: Romssa Arena; Attendance: 5,291; Referee: Sigurd Smehus Kringstad |
Note: Fixture was initially scheduled for a 22:00 kick-off, but was moved because of a clash with the 2025 UEFA Champions League final.

| 22 June 2025 10 | HamKam | 1–3 | Tromsø | Hamar |
| 17:00 CEST (UTC+2) | Roaldsøy 50' | Report | Erlien 21'; Edvardsson 26'; Camões (yellow card) 45+2', (goal) 47'; Kinteh (yellow card) 65' | Stadium: Briskeby Stadion; Attendance: 3,555; Referee: Kristoffer Hagenes |

| 29 June 2025 11 | Fredrikstad | 0–1 | Tromsø | Fredrikstad |
| 17:00 CEST (UTC+2) | Holten (yellow card) 45+1' | Report | Camões 10'; Haugaard (yellow card) 74' | Stadium: Fredrikstad Stadion; Attendance: 7,500; Referee: Eivind Bodding |

| 5 July 2025 12 | Tromsø | 1–0 | Molde | Tromsø |
| 22:00 CEST (UTC+2) | Guddal (yellow card) 32'; Edvardsson (yellow card) 40'; Braut 80'; Cornic (yellow card) 87' | Report | Sery (yellow card) 14' (yellow-red card) 44' | Stadium: Romssa Arena; Attendance: 6,122; Referee: Rohit Saggi |

| 13 July 2025 13 | Strømsgodset | 2–3 | Tromsø | Drammen |
| 17:00 CEST (UTC+2) | Taaje 43'; Farji (yellow card) 45+4', (goal) 68' | Report | Norheim 10', 15'; Cornic 90+6' | Stadium: Marienlyst Stadion; Attendance: 4,954; Referee: Stian Røvig Sletner |

| 20 July 2025 14 | Tromsø | 3–1 | Bryne | Tromsø |
| 17:00 CEST (UTC+2) | Skjærvik (yellow card) 26'; Erlien 45+1' (pen.), 55'; Hjertø-Dahl 58' | Report | Sødal (yellow card) 45'; Husebø (yellow card) 46'; Moreira 52' | Stadium: Romssa Arena; Attendance: 5,546; Referee: Christian Moen |

| 27 July 2025 15 | Rosenborg | 4–1 | Tromsø | Trondheim |
| 14:30 CEST (UTC+2) | Nordli (yellow card) 8'; Islamović 30', 38' (pen.), 55', 90+2'; U. Yttergård Jenssen (yellow card) 85' | Report | Kinteh (yellow card) 20'; Braut 64'; Edvardsson (yellow card) 71'; Åsen Larsen (yellow card) 76'; Vådebu (red card) 90' | Stadium: Lerkendal Stadion; Attendance: 14,422; Referee: Marius Waskaas Lien |

| 2 August 2025 16 | Tromsø | 0–0 | Fredrikstad | Tromsø |
| 16:00 CEST (UTC+2) | | Report | Skogvold (yellow card) 25'; Øhlenschlæger (yellow card) 72'; Bjartalíð (yellow card) 87'; Holten (yellow card) 90+2' | Stadium: Romssa Arena; Attendance: 5,017; Referee: Kristoffer Hagenes |

| 9 August 2025 17 | Bodø/Glimt | 1–1 | Tromsø | Bodø |
| 19:15 CEST (UTC+2) | Høgh 22' (pen.) | Report | Camões 45+1'; Haugaard (yellow card) 89' | Stadium: Aspmyra Stadion; Attendance: 8,173; Referee: Ola Hobber Nilsen |

| 17 August 2025 18 | Tromsø | 1–2 | Brann | Tromsø |
| 14:30 CEST (UTC+2) | Cornic (yellow card) 20'; Kinteh (yellow card) 30'; Erlien 39' | Report | Magnússon 63'; De Roeve 75'; Horn Myhre (yellow card) 76'; Castro (yellow card) 87'; Helland (yellow card) 88' | Stadium: Romssa Arena; Attendance: 6,477; Referee: Tore Hansen |
Note: Fixture was initially scheduled on 16 August, but was moved because of Brann's involvement in the 2025–26 UEFA Europa League qualifying.

| 24 August 2025 19 | Molde | 2–0 | Tromsø | Molde |
| 19:15 CEST (UTC+2) | Gulbrandsen 27' (pen.); Karlstrøm (yellow card) 45+3'; Kabini (yellow card) 60'; Stenevik 73' (pen.) | Report | Yttergård Jenssen (yellow card) 32'; Skjærvik (yellow card) 39' | Stadium: Aker Stadion; Attendance: 5,919; Referee: Rohit Saggi |

| 31 August 2025 20 | Tromsø | 2–0 | KFUM Oslo | Tromsø |
| 17:00 CEST (UTC+2) | Camões 3'; Edvardsson (yellow card) 51'; Hjertø-Dahl (yellow card) 59'; Cornic 68'; Kinteh (red card) 85' | Report | | Stadium: Romssa Arena; Attendance: 4,356; Referee: Svein Tore Sinnes |

| 14 September 2025 21 | Bryne | 0–2 | Tromsø | Bryne |
| 14:30 CEST (UTC+2) | Gregersen (yellow card) 35' | Report | Olden Larsen 9'; Braut 82' | Stadium: Bryne Stadion; Attendance: 3,224; Referee: Mathias Støfringshaug |

| 21 September 2025 22 | Tromsø | 1–0 | HamKam | Tromsø |
| 17:00 CEST (UTC+2) | Guddal (yellow card) 42'; Camões 48', (yellow card) 61' | Report | Ekeroth (yellow card) 54' | Stadium: Romssa Arena; Attendance: 4,319; Referee: Sigurd Smehus Kringstad |

| 28 September 2025 23 | Tromsø | 3–1 | Strømsgodset | Tromsø |
| 17:00 CEST (UTC+2) | Camões 16', 45+2' (yellow card) 17'; Edvardsson (yellow card) 41'; Warneryd 49'; Kinteh (yellow card) 54' | Report | Enersen 13'; Vilsvik (yellow card) 55' | Stadium: Romssa Arena; Attendance: 4,068; Referee: Christian Moen |

| 4 October 2025 24 | Vålerenga | 1–0 | Tromsø | Oslo |
| 14:00 CEST (UTC+2) | Hedvall (yellow card) 63'; Strand (yellow card) 70'; Lange (yellow card) 75'; Sjåtil (yellow card) 77'; Meliga (yellow card) 80'; Ofkir 88' | Report | Cornic (yellow card) 90+2' | Stadium: Intility Arena; Attendance: 8,423; Referee: Daniel Higraff |

| 19 October 2025 25 | Tromsø | 1–3 | Viking | Tromsø |
| 14:30 CEST (UTC+2) | Hjertø-Dahl 12'; Kinteh (yellow card) 35' | Report | Christiansen 15' (pen.); Roseth (yellow card) 52'; Bjørshol 64'; D'Agostino 87' (pen.) | Stadium: Romssa Arena; Attendance: 5,021; Referee: Espen Eskås |

| 26 October 2025 26 | Haugesund | 2–3 | Tromsø | Haugesund |
| 17:00 CET (UTC+1) | Rohd 24'; Koskela (yellow card) 35'; Hämäläinen 43'; Hannola (yellow card) 72'; Bizoza (yellow card) 76' | Report | Camões 20' (pen.); Cornic 36', 51'; Skjærvik (yellow card) 61'; Hjertø-Dahl (yellow card) 75' | Stadium: Haugesund Stadion; Attendance: 2,783; Referee: Kristoffer Hagenes |

| 2 November 2025 27 | Tromsø | 4–0 | Sarpsborg 08 | Tromsø |
| 19:15 CET (UTC+1) | Hjertø-Dahl 15'; Camões 24' (pen.), 26'; Olden Larsen 67' | Report | Sandberg (yellow card) 83'; Koch (yellow card) 90' | Stadium: Romssa Arena; Attendance: 3,738; Referee: Stian Røvig Sletner |

| 9 November 2025 28 | Sandefjord | 1–0 | Tromsø | Sandefjord |
| 17:00 CET (UTC+1) | Ottosson 23'; Smajlović (yellow card) 40'; Mettler (yellow card) 90+1' | Report | Edvardsson (yellow card) 89'; Yttergård Jenssen (yellow card) 90+3' | Stadium: Sandefjord Arena; Attendance: 3,740; Referee: Marius Waskaas Lien |

| 22 November 2025 29 | Tromsø | 1–0 | Rosenborg | Tromsø |
| 14:00 CET (UTC+1) | R. Yttergård Jenssen 6'; Skjærvik (yellow card) 25'; Erlien (yellow card) 34'; Warneryd (yellow card) 55' | Report | Selnæs (yellow card) 29'; U. Yttergård Jenssen (yellow card) 90' | Stadium: Romssa Arena; Attendance: 5,707; Referee: Ola Hobber Nilsen |

| 30 November 2025 30 | Kristiansund | 1–3 | Tromsø | Kristiansund |
| 17:00 CET (UTC+1) | Skeide (yellow card) 65'; Corlu 71' | Report | Edvardsson 8'; Olden Larsen 14'; Kinteh (yellow card) 32', (goal) 45+4'; Cornic (yellow card) 35' | Stadium: Nordmøre Stadion; Attendance: 2,948; Referee: Mohammad Usman Aslam |

=== Norwegian Cup ===
==== 2025 ====
In the first round Tromsø were drawn against either Bossekop or Hamna, both Norwegian Fourth Division clubs, before Hamna beat Bossekop in the final qualification round. They were then drawn away to Norwegian Third Division side Skjervøy in the second round. In the third round they were drawn at home to fellow Eliteserien side KFUM Oslo.

| 13 April 2025 First round | Hamna | 0–10 | Tromsø | Tromsø |
| 16:00 CEST (UTC+2) | | Report | Paintsil 10'; Braut 24', 57', 59', 75', 77'; Christensen 26', 40'; Røsæg 55' (o.g.); Kinteh (yellow card) 88'; Kleiva 90+1' | Stadium: Romssa Arena; Attendance: 818; Referee: Øyvind Jøstensen |

| 23 April 2025 Second round | Skjervøy | 0–1 | Tromsø | Skjervøy |
| 18:00 CEST (UTC+2) | Gherghinoiu (yellow card) 26'; Jakobsen (yellow card) 45' | Report | Christensen 45', (yellow card) 57' | Stadium: Lerøy Stadion; Attendance: 292; Referee: Egil Bertheussen |

| 8 May 2025 Third round | Tromsø | 0–1 | KFUM Oslo | Tromsø |
| 18:00 CEST (UTC+2) | Norheim (yellow card) 47' | Report | Hjort 23'; Aleesami (yellow card) 62'; Kristensen (yellow card) 69'; Nuñez (yellow card) 90+6' | Stadium: Romssa Arena; Attendance: 1,306; Referee: Kristoffer Hagenes |

==== 2025–26 ====
Ahead of the 2026 Norwegian Cup the Norwegian Football Federation decided to change the Norwegian Cup from being played over one calendar year, like the league, to being played over two years. In a transition period, this meant that the Eliteserien clubs entered the Cup in the Third Round. Tromsø were drawn at home against Eliteserien side Kristiansund. In the fourth round Tromsø were drawn against Eliteserien side KFUM Oslo.

| 24 September 2025 Third round | Tromsø | 2–1 | Kristiansund | Tromsø |
| 18:00 CEST (UTC+2) | Braut 25', 38' | Report | Rønning (yellow card) 82'; Kilen 90+1' | Stadium: Romssa Arena; Attendance: 1,104; Referee: Stian Røvig Sletner |

The remaining rounds took place during the 2026 season.

== Squad statistics ==
=== Appearances and goals ===
Players with no appearances are not included on the list.

| No. | Pos | Nat | Player | Total | | Eliteserien | | 2025 Norwegian Cup | | 2025–26 Norwegian Cup | |
| No. | Pos | Nat | Player | Apps | Goals | Apps | Goals | Apps | Goals | Apps | Goals |
|---|---|---|---|---|---|---|---|---|---|---|---|
| 1 | GK | (Denmark) DEN | Jakob Haugaard | 30 | 0 | 30+0 | 0 | 0+0 | 0 | 0+0 | 0 |
| 2 | DF | (Norway) NOR | Leo Cornic | 31 | 5 | 29+0 | 5 | 1+0 | 0 | 1+0 | 0 |
| 3 | DF | (Norway) NOR | Jesper Robertsen | 2 | 0 | 0+0 | 0 | 2+0 | 0 | 0+0 | 0 |
| 4 | DF | (Norway) NOR | Vetle Skjærvik | 30 | 2 | 28+0 | 2 | 1+0 | 0 | 1+0 | 0 |
| 5 | DF | (Norway) NOR | Anders Jenssen | 19 | 0 | 6+11 | 0 | 0+1 | 0 | 0+1 | 0 |
| 6 | MF | (Norway) NOR | Jens Hjertø-Dahl | 31 | 4 | 28+2 | 4 | 0+1 | 0 | 0+0 | 0 |
| 7 (Note: Paintsil wore number 7 until his departure on 24 July 2025. Olden Larsen replaced him as number 7.) | MF | (Norway) NOR | Yaw Paintsil | 10 | 1 | 1+7 | 0 | 2+0 | 1 | 0+0 | 0 |
| 7 | FW | (Norway) NOR | Lars Olden Larsen | 13 | 3 | 7+5 | 3 | 0+0 | 0 | 1+0 | 0 |
| 8 | MF | (Norway) NOR | Kent-Are Antonsen | 14 | 1 | 6+7 | 1 | 1+0 | 0 | 0+0 | 0 |
| 9 | FW | (Portugal) POR | Ieltsin Camões | 27 | 13 | 19+6 | 13 | 1+1 | 0 | 0+0 | 0 |
| 10 | MF | (Norway) NOR | Jakob Napoleon Romsaas | 9 | 1 | 5+3 | 1 | 0+1 | 0 | 0+0 | 0 |
| 11 | MF | (Norway) NOR | Ruben Yttergård Jenssen | 32 | 2 | 30+0 | 2 | 1+0 | 0 | 1+0 | 0 |
| 14 | FW | (Norway) NOR | Sigurd Prestmo | 6 | 0 | 0+4 | 0 | 2+0 | 0 | 0+0 | 0 |
| 15 | FW | (Norway) NOR | Vegard Erlien | 30 | 9 | 24+4 | 9 | 1+0 | 0 | 1+0 | 0 |
| 17 | FW | (Norway) NOR | August Mikkelsen | 19 | 0 | 5+11 | 0 | 2+0 | 0 | 0+1 | 0 |
| 18 | FW | (Norway) NOR | Daniel Braut | 33 | 10 | 2+27 | 3 | 2+1 | 5 | 1+0 | 2 |
| 19 | MF | (Norway) NOR | Heine Åsen Larsen | 5 | 0 | 1+4 | 0 | 0+0 | 0 | 0+0 | 0 |
| 20 | MF | (Sweden) SWE | David Edvardsson | 31 | 3 | 23+4 | 3 | 3+0 | 0 | 1+0 | 0 |
| 21 | DF | (Norway) NOR | Tobias Guddal | 31 | 0 | 29+0 | 0 | 1+0 | 0 | 0+1 | 0 |
| 22 | FW | (Denmark) DEN | Frederik Christensen | 3 | 3 | 0+1 | 0 | 2+0 | 3 | 0+0 | 0 |
| 23 (Note: Norheim wore number 23 until his departure on 27 August 2025. Husebø replaced him as number 23.) | MF | (Norway) NOR | Runar Norheim | 20 | 2 | 17+2 | 2 | 1+0 | 0 | 0+0 | 0 |
| 23 | DF | (Norway) NOR | Jens Husebø | 4 | 0 | 0+4 | 0 | 0+0 | 0 | 0+0 | 0 |
| 24 | DF | (Norway) NOR | Ruben Kristiansen | 11 | 0 | 2+6 | 0 | 2+0 | 0 | 1+0 | 0 |
| 25 | DF | (The Gambia) GAM | Abubacarr Sedi Kinteh | 25 | 1 | 19+2 | 1 | 3+0 | 0 | 1+0 | 0 |
| 27 | GK | (Norway) NOR | Ole Kristian Lauvli | 4 | 0 | 0+0 | 0 | 3+0 | 0 | 1+0 | 0 |
| 29 | DF | (Sweden) SWE | Alexander Warneryd | 14 | 1 | 11+2 | 1 | 0+0 | 0 | 0+1 | 0 |
| 30 | DF | (Norway) NOR | Isak Vådebu | 17 | 0 | 8+6 | 0 | 2+0 | 0 | 1+0 | 0 |
| 31 | DF | (Norway) NOR | Daniel Bær | 1 | 0 | 0+0 | 0 | 0+1 | 0 | 0+0 | 0 |
| 32 | GK | (Norway) NOR | Mads Trige | 1 | 0 | 0+0 | 0 | 0+1 | 0 | 0+0 | 0 |
| 34 | DF | (Norway) NOR | Mads Mikkelsen | 1 | 0 | 0+0 | 0 | 0+1 | 0 | 0+0 | 0 |
| 35 | FW | (Norway) NOR | Johan Solstad-Nøis | 2 | 0 | 0+0 | 0 | 0+1 | 0 | 0+1 | 0 |
| 37 | MF | (Norway) NOR | Sander Innvær | 2 | 0 | 0+2 | 0 | 0+0 | 0 | 0+0 | 0 |
| – | MF | (Norway) NOR | Casper Kleiva | 1 | 1 | 0+0 | 0 | 0+1 | 1 | 0+0 | 0 |

=== Clean sheets ===
| Rank | No. | Player | Eliteserien | 2025 Norwegian Cup | 2025–26 Norwegian Cup | Total |
|---|---|---|---|---|---|---|
| 1 | 1 | (Denmark) Jakob Haugaard | 10 | 0 | 0 | 10 |
| 2 | 27 | (Norway) Ole Kristian Lauvli | 0 | 2 | 0 | 2 |
| 3 | 32 | (Norway) Mats Trige | 0 | 1 | 0 | 1 |
| Total | | | 10 | 3 | 0 | 13 |

=== Disciplinary record ===
| No. | Pos. | Player | Eliteserien | | | 2025 Norwegian Cup | | | 2025–26 Norwegian Cup | | | Total | | |
| No. | Pos. | Player | Yellow card | (yellow card) (yellow-red card) | Red card | Yellow card | (yellow card) (yellow-red card) | Red card | Yellow card | (yellow card) (yellow-red card) | Red card | Yellow card | (yellow card) (yellow-red card) | Red card |
|---|---|---|---|---|---|---|---|---|---|---|---|---|---|---|
| 1 | GK | (Denmark) Jakob Haugaard | 3 | 0 | 0 | 0 | 0 | 0 | 0 | 0 | 0 | 3 | 0 | 0 |
| 2 | DF | (Norway) Leo Cornic | 5 | 0 | 0 | 0 | 0 | 0 | 0 | 0 | 0 | 5 | 0 | 0 |
| 4 | DF | (Norway) Vetle Skjærvik | 8 | 0 | 0 | 0 | 0 | 0 | 0 | 0 | 0 | 8 | 0 | 0 |
| 5 | DF | (Norway) Anders Jenssen | 1 | 0 | 0 | 0 | 0 | 0 | 0 | 0 | 0 | 1 | 0 | 0 |
| 6 | MF | (Norway) Jens Hjertø-Dahl | 3 | 0 | 0 | 0 | 0 | 0 | 0 | 0 | 0 | 3 | 0 | 0 |
| 7 | MF | (Norway) Yaw Paintsil | 1 | 0 | 0 | 0 | 0 | 0 | 0 | 0 | 0 | 1 | 0 | 0 |
| 8 | MF | (Norway) Kent-Are Antonsen | 1 | 0 | 0 | 0 | 0 | 0 | 0 | 0 | 0 | 1 | 0 | 0 |
| 9 | FW | (Portugal) Ieltsin Camões | 3 | 0 | 0 | 0 | 0 | 0 | 0 | 0 | 0 | 3 | 0 | 0 |
| 10 | MF | (Norway) Jakob Napoleon Romsaas | 2 | 0 | 0 | 0 | 0 | 0 | 0 | 0 | 0 | 2 | 0 | 0 |
| 11 | MF | (Norway) Ruben Yttergård Jenssen | 2 | 0 | 0 | 0 | 0 | 0 | 0 | 0 | 0 | 2 | 0 | 0 |
| 15 | FW | (Norway) Vegard Erlien | 1 | 0 | 0 | 0 | 0 | 0 | 0 | 0 | 0 | 1 | 0 | 0 |
| 17 | FW | (Norway) August Mikkelsen | 1 | 0 | 0 | 0 | 0 | 0 | 0 | 0 | 0 | 1 | 0 | 0 |
| 19 | MF | (Norway) Heine Åsen Larsen | 1 | 0 | 0 | 0 | 0 | 0 | 0 | 0 | 0 | 1 | 0 | 0 |
| 20 | MF | (Sweden) David Edvardsson | 8 | 0 | 0 | 0 | 0 | 0 | 0 | 0 | 0 | 8 | 0 | 0 |
| 21 | DF | (Norway) Tobias Guddal | 4 | 0 | 0 | 0 | 0 | 0 | 0 | 0 | 0 | 4 | 0 | 0 |
| 22 | FW | (Denmark) Frederik Christensen | 0 | 0 | 0 | 1 | 0 | 0 | 0 | 0 | 0 | 1 | 0 | 0 |
| 23 | MF | (Norway) Runar Norheim | 0 | 0 | 0 | 1 | 0 | 0 | 0 | 0 | 0 | 1 | 0 | 0 |
| 25 | DF | (The Gambia) Abubacarr Sedi Kinteh | 8 | 0 | 1 | 1 | 0 | 0 | 0 | 0 | 0 | 9 | 0 | 1 |
| 29 | DF | (Sweden) Alexander Warneryd | 1 | 0 | 0 | 0 | 0 | 0 | 0 | 0 | 0 | 1 | 0 | 0 |
| 30 | DF | (Norway) Isak Vådebu | 0 | 0 | 1 | 0 | 0 | 0 | 0 | 0 | 0 | 0 | 0 | 1 |
| Total | | | 53 | 0 | 2 | 3 | 0 | 0 | 0 | 0 | 0 | 56 | 0 | 2 |

== See also ==
- Tromsø IL seasons
