= Jens Hjertø-Dahl =

Norwegian footballer (born 2005)

- Hjertø-Dahl in 2026

Personal information
- Date of birth: 31 October 2005 (age 21)
- Place of birth: Tromsø, Norway
- Height: 1.93 m (6 ft 4 in)
- Position: Midfielder

Team information
- Current team: Hull City
- Number: 14

Youth career
- 2011: Fløya
- 2011–2021: Tromsø

Senior career*
Years	Team	Apps	(Gls)
2021–2023	Tromsø 2	35	(7)
2023–2026	Tromsø	89	(12)
2026–	Hull City	1	(0)

International career^{‡}
2021	Norway U16	2	(0)
2022	Norway U17	1	(0)
2023	Norway U18	10	(2)
2024	Norway U19	5	(0)
2025–	Norway U21	12	(0)
- * Club domestic league appearances and goals as of 5 September 2026 ‡ National team caps and goals as of 14 November 2026

Jens Hjertø-Dahl (born 31 October 2005) is a Norwegian professional footballer who plays as a midfielder for Premier League club Hull City.

== Club career ==
=== Tromsø ===
Hjertø-Dahl started playing for Fløya at the age of five, before moving to Tromsø after starting school in 2011. In the summer of 2020, at fourteen years old, Hjertø-Dahl had his first training with the first team. He signed his first professional contract with the club as he turned fifteen on 31 October. His first game for the second team came in 2021, and by 2022 he was playing regularly for the second team.

Hjertø-Dahl got his debut for the first team on 13 May 2023 against HamKam, as a substitute for Sakarias Opsahl. His first two goals for the club came later that month in a cup tie against Hammerfest On 31 October, his 18th birthday, Hjertø-Dahl signed a new four-year contract, keeping him at the club until the end of 2027. His first goal in the Eliteserien came as he scored the winning goal against Rosenborg in May 2024. After a successful 2025 season with Tromsø, Hjertø-Dahl was a nominee for Eliteserien Young Player of the Year awarded by Norsk Toppfotball and TV2, eventually losing out to Edvin Austbø.

In January 2026, Hjertø-Dahl declined an offer from Turkish side Beşiktaş in what would have been the clubs biggest sale, citing that there was nothing wrong with the offer, but that it felt right to stay at Tromsø for the time being. He would later go on to sign a new four-year contract with the club. In the opening game of the 2026 season, Hjertø-Dahl scored a hat-trick of headers against Fredrikstad, securing a 4–0 win. Hjertø-Dahl's final two games for the club came in the UEFA Europa League qualifying rounds against Hradec Králové, where he missed a penalty in the first game as the club lost 4–1 on aggregate score.

=== Hull City ===
On 7 August 2026, Hjertø-Dahl signed a five-year contract with newly promoted Premier League club Hull City. On 5 September, he made his Premier League debut for the club as a substitute in a 0-0 draw against Aston Villa.

== International career ==
Hjertø-Dahl first appeared for Norway at the under-16 level, before moving on to their other youth teams. He also captained their under-18 team.

After the Norwegian Under-19 team qualified for the UEFA Under-19 Euro 2024, Hjertø-Dahl was denied permission to play for the team, as the tournament clashed with several of Tromsø's Eliteserien matches. In 2025, Hjertø-Dahl was once again denied permission to play for one of the youth national teams, this time the Norwegian Under-20 in the 2025 FIFA U-20 World Cup taking place in Chile, as he and teammate Daniel Braut were deemed to be too important for the club in their upcoming games.

== Style of play ==
Hjertø-Dahl has cited Paul Pogba, Sergio Busquets, and Ivan Rakitić as influences on his own style of play.

In 2023, then head coach of the Norway U18 team Luís Pimenta praised Hjertø-Dahl, especially his physique and control, while also calling him a "future leader".

CIES Football Observatory named Hjertø-Dahl as one of the 100 best players under the age of 20 based on their relative experience level in September 2024.

== Career statistics ==
As of 5 September 2026

Appearances and goals by club, season and competition
Club	Season	League			National cup (Note: Includes Norwegian Cup)		League cup		Europe		Total	
Club	Season	Division	Apps	Goals	Apps	Goals	Apps	Goals	Apps	Goals	Apps	Goals
Tromsø 2	2021	Norwegian Third Division	5	0	—		—		—		5	0
Tromsø 2	2022	Norwegian Third Division	22	6	—		—		—		22	6
Tromsø 2	2023	Norwegian Third Division	8	1	—		—		—		8	1
Tromsø 2	Total		35	7	—		—		—		35	7
Tromsø	2023	Eliteserien	16	0	4	3	—		—		20	3
Tromsø	2024	Eliteserien	29	1	3	3	—		4 (Note: Appearances in UEFA Conference League)	1	36	5
Tromsø	2025	Eliteserien	30	4	1	0	—		—		31	4
Tromsø	2026	Eliteserien	14	7	1	0	—		2 (Note: Appearances in UEFA Europa League)	0	17	7
Tromsø	Total		89	12	9	6	—		6	1	104	19
Hull City	2026–27	Premier League	1	0	0	0	1	0	—		2	0
Career total			125	19	9	6	1	0	6	1	141	26

== Honours ==
Individual

- Eliteserien Young Player of the Month: June/July 2025, November 2025
