= Daniel Braut =

Norwegian footballer (born 2005)

Personal information
- Date of birth: 1 May 2005 (age 21)
- Place of birth: Sandnes, Norway
- Height: 1.90 m (6 ft 3 in)
- Position: Striker

Team information
- Current team: Tromsø
- Number: 9

Youth career
- –2018: Ganddal
- 2019–2023: Sandnes Ulf

Senior career*
Years	Team	Apps	(Gls)
2021–2023	Sandnes Ulf 2	48	(18)
2022–2025	Sandnes Ulf	42	(6)
2025	→Tromsø (loan)	8	(0)
2025	→Tromsø 2 (loan)	1	(1)
2025–	Tromsø	41	(5)

International career^{‡}
2024	Norway U19	6	(4)
2025	Norway U20	2	(1)
- * Club domestic league appearances and goals as of 21 November 2026 ‡ National team caps and goals as of 21 July 2025

Daniel Braut (born 1 May 2005) is a Norwegian footballer who currently plays as a striker for Tromsø.

== Career ==
=== Sandnes Ulf ===
At sixteen years old, Braut signed his first professional contract with Sandnes Ulf in February 2022. The contract lasted for three years. In April, his first match for the club came against Kongsvinger in the 1. divisjon, while his first goal came three months later against Åsane at home in a 6–0 win. In September the next year, Braut extended his contract with the club, this time lasting until the end of the 2025 season. He extended his contract once again in February 2024, only six months after the previous extension, lasting an additional year, through the 2026 season.

The 2024 season would turn out to be Braut's most productive season at Sandnes Ulf, finishing the season with 5 goals, second most by a player from Sandnes Ulf, only behind Tommy Høiland. This happened despite the club's poor points tally, and eventual last place and relegation. In the summer transfer window, both Sarpsborg 08 and Italian Serie A side Torino tried to sign Braut, but Sandnes Ulf rejected both bids.

=== Tromsø ===
In February 2025, Braut was loaned out to the Eliteserien club Tromsø. The loan was described as a short-term loan, lasting until the summer, with an option to buy for Tromsø. Braut's debut for the club came in the opening game of the season against Haugesund, where he was subbed on for Vegard Erlien in the 87th minute. His first goal for the club came in a Norwegian Cup tie against Hamna, after first missing a penalty. Braut would go on to score five out of the ten goals scored in the game, and would subsequently be Tromsø's top scorer in the competition that season.

After eleven games and five goals, Tromsø decided to use the option to buy Braut from Sandnes Ulf on 18 June 2025. The total amount for both the loan and the permanent move was reported to be around 4 million NOK. Braut's first goal in the Eliteserien came about two weeks later, as he scored the winning goal against Molde on 6 July, after once again being subbed on for Vegard Erlien.

== International career ==
Braut has appeared for both the Norwegian U19 and U20 team. He was included in Luís Pimenta's U19 squad for the 2024 European U19 Championship in Northern Ireland in early July 2024. Braut subsequently went on to score three goals in the tournament, one against Italy, and two against Northern Ireland, finishing the tournament as its top scorer.

== Personal life ==
Braut is fifth cousin of fellow footballer Erling Haaland, although he has stated that he doesn't know him personally and has never talked to him.

== Career statistics ==
As of 21 November 2026

Appearances and goals by club, season and competition
Club	Season	League			National Cup		Europe		Total	
Club	Season	Division	Apps	Goals	Apps	Goals	Apps	Goals	Apps	Goals
Sandnes Ulf 2	2021	Norwegian Fourth Division	11	6	—		—		11	6
Sandnes Ulf 2	2022	Norwegian Third Division	18	4	—		—		18	4
Sandnes Ulf 2	2023	Norwegian Third Division	19	8	—		—		19	8
Sandnes Ulf 2	Total		48	18	—		—		48	18
Sandnes Ulf	2022	Norwegian First Division	3	1	1	0	—		4	1
Sandnes Ulf	2023	Norwegian First Division	14	0	1	0	—		15	0
Sandnes Ulf	2024	Norwegian First Division	25	5	6	1	—		31	6
Sandnes Ulf	Total		42	6	8	1	—		50	7
Tromsø (loan)	2025	Eliteserien	8	0	3	5	—		11	5
Tromsø	2025	Eliteserien	21	3	1	2	—		22	5
Tromsø	2026	Eliteserien	20	2	1	1	5 (Note: Two appearances in UEFA Europa League, three appearances in UEFA Conference League)	0	26	3
Tromsø	Total		49	5	5	8	5	0	59	13
Career total			139	29	13	9	5	0	157	38

== Honours ==
Individual

- UEFA European Under-19 Championship Top Scorer: 2024
