= Ieltsin Camões =

Cape Verdean footballer (born 1999)

Personal information
- Full name: Ieltsin Jerónimo Semedo Camões
- Date of birth: 16 April 1999 (age 27)
- Place of birth: Luanda, Angola
- Height: 1.88 m (6 ft 2 in)
- Position: Striker

Team information
- Current team: Śląsk Wrocław (on loan from Tromsø)
- Number: 9

Youth career
- Clube Atlético e Cultural
- –2013: Sporting CP
- 2013–2014: Clube Atlético e Cultural
- 2014–2016: Macclesfield Town
- 2016–2018: Nacional
- 2018–2019: Marítimo

Senior career*
Years	Team	Apps	(Gls)
2019	Marítimo B		
2019–2020	União Almeirim	7	(2)
2020–2021	Alverca B	5	(0)
2021–2022	Skellefteå FF	44	(37)
2023–2024	IK Brage	56	(22)
2025–	Tromsø	29	(15)
2025	Tromsø 2	1	(1)
2026	→ Al Ahly (loan)	4	(0)
2026–	→ Śląsk Wrocław (loan)	7	(0)

International career^{‡}
2026–	Cape Verde	3	(0)
- * Club domestic league appearances and goals as of 15:15, 9 November 2026 (UTC) ‡ National team caps and goals as of 23:29, 17 November 2026 (UTC)

Ieltsin Jerónimo Semedo Camões (Portuguese: [ˈjɛl.ʦin ʒɨ.ˈɾɔ.ni.mu sɨ.ˈme.du ka.ˈmõjʃ]; born 16 April 1999) is a professional footballer who plays as a striker for Ekstraklasa club Śląsk Wrocław, on loan from Tromsø. Born in Angola, he represents the Cape Verde national team.

== Early life ==
Camões was born on 16 April 1999 in Luanda, Angola and moved with his family to Lisbon, Portugal at the age of one. At the age of six, he started playing football before moving on to Sporting CP's youth academy. Camões stayed at Sporting's academy for three years until he moved with his family to Manchester, England at the age of fourteen. In England, Camões played for Macclesfield Town's academy before deciding to move back to Portugal after two years. He subsequently played for the academies of Nacional and Marítimo, both based in Funchal, Madeira.

== Career ==
Camões started his career with Portuguese side CS Marítimo B. In 2019, he signed for Portuguese side União Almeirim, before signing for Portuguese side Alverca B.

During the summer of 2021, he signed for Swedish side Skellefteå FF, where he was the top scorer of the 2022 Division 2 with twenty-six goals. Ahead of the 2023 season, he signed for Swedish side IK Brage, where he made fifty-six league appearances and scored twenty-two goals.

Subsequently, in February 2025, Camões signed for Norwegian side Tromsø on a three-year contract. The club was close to signing him in the summer window the year prior, but because of a high price-tag at the time, the move did not materialize. On 20 April 2025, he debuted and scored his first goal for the club during a 2–3 home loss to Kristiansund in the league. It would take until the end of June for Camões to get his first start in the Eliteserien, but by then he had already scored five goals coming off of the bench. Camões continued to score goals for the club, and by the end of the season he was Tromsø's top-scorer with thirteen goals.

On 31 January 2026, Camões signed a short-term loan deal with Egyptian Al Ahly until the end of the season, with an obligation to buy after the season, subject to certain parameters being met. After only seven appearances for the club, Camões returned to Tromsø as the loan deal was not made permanent. On 4 September 2026, he moved on loan again, this time joining Polish club Śląsk Wrocław for the rest of the season, with an option to buy.

== International career ==
Although being born in Angola, and growing up in Portugal, Camões' first international call-up came in 2026 for the Cape Verde national team, for matches against Chile and Finland as part of the 2026 FIFA Series. Camões' eligibility to play for Cape Verde came through his Cape Verdean grandfather. He was an unused substitute in the first game against Chile before starting the game against Finland, which Cape Verde went on to win after a penalty shoot-out.

== Career statistics ==
=== Club ===
As of match played 2 November 2026

Appearances and goals by club, season and competition
Club	Season	League			National cup (Note: Includes Svenska Cupen, Norwegian Cup, Polish Cup)		Continental		Total	
Club	Season	Division	Apps	Goals	Apps	Goals	Apps	Goals	Apps	Goals
Skellefteå FF	2021	Division 2	18	11	0	0	—		18	11
Skellefteå FF	2022	Division 2	26	26	0	0	—		26	26
Skellefteå FF	Total		44	37	0	0	—		44	37
IK Brage	2023	Superettan	29	9	1	0	—		30	9
IK Brage	2024	Superettan	27	13	4	4	—		31	17
IK Brage	Total		56	22	5	4	—		61	26
Tromsø	2025	Eliteserien	25	13	2	0	—		27	13
Tromsø	2026	Eliteserien	4	2	1	0	6 (Note: Two appearances in UEFA Europa League, four appearances in UEFA Conference League)	0	11	2
Tromsø	Total		29	15	3	0	6	0	38	15
Tromsø 2	2025	Norwegian Third Division	1	1	—		—		1	1
Al Ahly (loan)	2025–26	Egyptian Premier League	4	0	0	0	3 (Note: Appearances in CAF Champions League)	0	7	0
Śląsk Wrocław (loan)	2026–27	Ekstraklasa	7	0	1	0	—		8	0
Career total			141	75	9	4	9	0	159	79

=== International ===
As of match played 17 November 2026

Appearances and goals by national team and year
National team	Year	Apps	Goals
Cape Verde
Cape Verde	2026	3	0
Total		3	0
