= Ole Kristian Lauvli =

Norwegian footballer (born 1996)

Personal information
- Full name: Ole Kristian Gjefle Lauvli
- Date of birth: 13 May 1994 (age 32)
- Height: 1.93 m (6 ft 4 in)
- Position: Goalkeeper

Team information
- Current team: Tromsø
- Number: 12

Youth career
- –2013: Nordre Land

Senior career*
Years	Team	Apps	(Gls)
2011–2013	Nordre Land		
2014–2025	Raufoss	299	(0)
2025–	Tromsø	1	(0)
- * Club domestic league appearances and goals as of 16 August 2026

Ole Kristian Lauvli (born 13 May 1994) is a Norwegian football goalkeeper who currently plays for Tromsø.

== Career ==
Lauvli grew up in Nordre Land Municipality in Oppland county. He made his senior debut for Nordre Land in the 2011 3. divisjon.

After the Norwegian 2014 season concluded, Lauvli was on trial at Elche. The contact was made through a Spanish player in Norway. He trained with Elche B.

Following the end of the 2020 season, Lauvli was named to the First Division's Team of the Year and thus Goalkeeper of the Year. He had the highest average rating of the season, as graded by the Norwegian News Agency. He established himself as a stalwart in goal, not missing a single league match in 2021, 2022, 2023 and 2024. In 2024 Lauvli was again named Goalkeeper of the Year, this time by TV 2's pundit Amund Lutnæs.

Another highlight in his career came when Raufoss eliminated first-tier team Viking from the 2023 Norwegian Cup. The match went to a penalty shoot-out, where Lauvli saved the first two Viking penalties. Lauvli was reportedly sought after by fellow First Division club Kongsvinger in 2023. In 2025, Lauvli left Raufoss after 11 seasons, and signed for the first Eliteserien team in his career, Tromsø.

== Personal life ==
Among his hobbies is poker. Lauvli finished 13th in the Norwegian Poker Championships of 2021, which was held online due to COVID-19.

By 2022, he had two children.

== Career statistics ==
As of 16 August 2026

Appearances and goals by club, season and competition
Club	Season	League			National Cup		Other		Total	
Club	Season	Division	Apps	Goals	Apps	Goals	Apps	Goals	Apps	Goals
Nordre Land	2012	3. divisjon	16	0	0	0	—		16	0
Nordre Land	2013	3. divisjon	23	0	1	0	—		24	0
Nordre Land	Total		39	0	1	0	—		40	0
Raufoss	2014	2. divisjon	24	0	0	0	—		24	0
Raufoss	2015	2. divisjon	26	0	2	0	—		28	0
Raufoss	2016	1. divisjon	22	0	0	0	—		22	0
Raufoss	2017	2. divisjon	26	0	2	0	2 (Note: Appearances in 2. divisjon promotional play-offs)	0	30	0
Raufoss	2018	2. divisjon	25	0	2	0	—		27	0
Raufoss	2019	1. divisjon	27	0	2	0	—		29	0
Raufoss	2020	1. divisjon	29	0	—		1 (Note: Appearance in Eliteserien play-offs)	0	30	0
Raufoss	2021	1. divisjon	30	0	3	0	—		33	0
Raufoss	2022	1. divisjon	30	0	2	0	—		32	0
Raufoss	2023	1. divisjon	30	0	5	0	—		35	0
Raufoss	2024	1. divisjon	30	0	4	0	—		34	0
Raufoss	Total		299	0	22	0	3	0	324	0
Tromsø	2025	Eliteserien	0	0	4	0	0	0	4	0
Tromsø	2026	Eliteserien	1	0	0	0	0	0	1	0
Tromsø	Total		1	0	4	0	0	0	5	0
Career total			339	0	27	0	3	0	369	0
