= Ruben Yttergård Jenssen =

Norwegian footballer (born 1988)

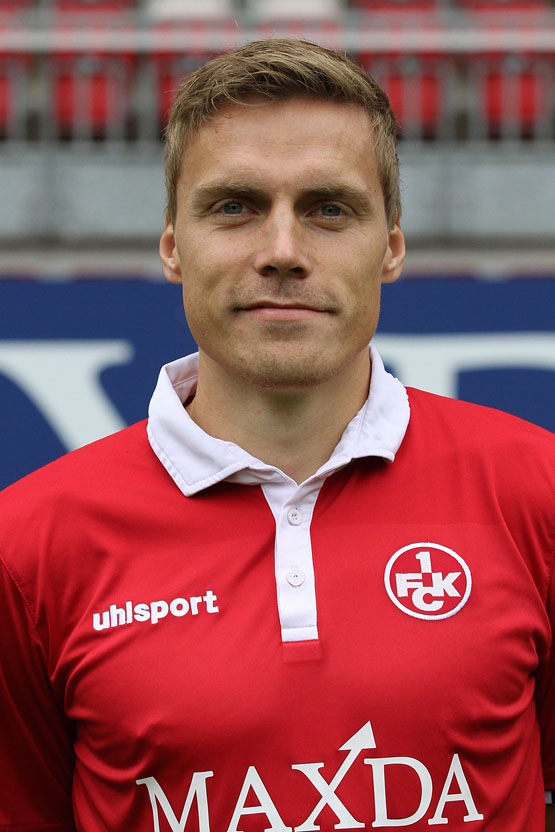
- Yttergård Jenssen with 1. FC Kaiserslautern in 2015

Personal information
- Full name: Ruben Yttergård Jenssen
- Date of birth: 4 May 1988 (age 38)
- Place of birth: Tromsø, Norway
- Height: 1.73 m (5 ft 8 in)
- Position: Midfielder

Team information
- Current team: Tromsø
- Number: 11

Youth career
- –1996: Fløya
- 1997: Sogndal
- 1998–2004: Fløya
- 2005–2006: Tromsø

Senior career*
Years	Team	Apps	(Gls)
2005–2013	Tromsø	171	(4)
2013–2016	1. FC Kaiserslautern	75	(9)
2016–2018	Groningen	45	(2)
2018	→ 1. FC Kaiserslautern (loan)	14	(0)
2018–2020	Brann	38	(3)
2019	Brann 2	1	(0)
2020–	Tromsø	197	(11)

International career^{‡}
2004	Norway U16	3	(0)
2005	Norway U17	4	(0)
2006	Norway U18	8	(1)
2007	Norway U19	5	(1)
2008–2010	Norway U21	13	(0)
2010–2016	Norway	39	(0)
- * Club domestic league appearances and goals as of 21 November 2026 ‡ National team caps and goals as of 25 September 2016

Ruben Yttergård Jenssen (born 4 May 1988) is a Norwegian footballer who plays as a midfielder for Eliteserien club Tromsø.

Yttergård Jenssen played for both Fløya and Sogndal in his youth. In 2005, he moved to Tromsø where he would go on to have success as one of their best midfielders. In 2013, Yttergård Jennsen moved to 1. FC Kaiserslautern after nine seasons at Tromsø. In Germany he played in the 2. Bundesliga for three years, before being transferred to Dutch side Groningen in 2016. After a year-and-a-half in the Netherlands, he was loaned back to his former club 1. FC Kaiserslautern, before moving permanently to Norwegian side Brann in 2018. Yttergård Jenssen stayed at Brann for one and a half seasons before returning to his first professional club Tromsø in early 2020. His second spell at the club saw Yttergård Jenssen once again become one of Tromsø's most important and trusted players.

Early in his career, Jenssen played as a winger, but he later played as a central midfielder. Jenssen made his international debut for Norway in May 2010, and was a regular starter from September 2012. His last game came in September 2016, ending his international career with thirty-nine games.

== Early life ==
Born in Tromsø, Jenssen played for Fløya during his youth. His family moved to Sogn og Fjordane when his father, Truls Jenssen, was head coach of Sogndal IL during the 1997 season, and the nine-year-old played for a team in Sogndal's youth department.

Jenssen's mother, Ann-Torild, who played basketball for Tromsø Basketballklubb (now Tromsø Storm) did not want him to play football and wanted him to try out gymnastics and basketball instead. After he played basketball for a year when he was 13, he asked his mother if he could quit.

== Club career ==
=== Tromsø ===
==== 2006 season ====
After playing for Tromsø's youth team, Jenssen was promoted to the first-team squad ahead of the 2006 season. He signed a four-year contract with the club in April 2006, and Steinar Nilsen, Tromsø's director of sports, stated that Jenssen was one of the most talented footballers hailing from Tromsø ever. Tromsø's head coach Ivar Morten Normark claimed that the signing of Jenssen was better for the development of young players from Northern Norway, than if the club had signed Ronaldinho.

Jenssen had been playing as a central midfielder during his youth, but was retrained as a left wing in 2006. He made his debut for Tromsø in the first match of the 2006 Tippeligaen against Molde on 9 April 2006. Despite starting the first match of the season, Jenssen did not play regularly for the Tromsø-team that battled against relegation in 2006. He made four more appearances as a substitute in the league, and played one match in the Norwegian Cup. Following Ole Martin Årst's transfer from Standard Liège to Tromsø in 2006, the Belgium club had secured an option to sign Jenssen free of charge, and he was in 2006 offered a contract with the club's academy. Jenssen rejected this offer. He was again offered a one-year contract with Standard in June 2007, this time with the club's first team, but Jenssen also turned this offer down.

==== 2007 season ====
With Steinar Nilsen as head coach in the 2007 season, Jenssen made 15 appearances in the league, all as a substitute.

==== 2008 season ====
After starting a few matches for Tromsø in the 2008 season, Jenssen scored his first goal in Tippeligaen with a match-winning goal against HamKam on 20 July 2008. Jenssen scored another match-winning goal in August, this time against Aalesund, and became a regular starter for Tromsø during the season, contributing to the team's bronze medals.

==== 2009 season ====
After Steinar Nilsen moved to Brann, Per-Mathias Høgmo became the head coach of Tromsø, and Jenssen was in the 2009 season Høgmo's most used player as he played all of the 30 matches in the 2009 Tippeligaen. After having played as a winger for Tromsø, he became a central midfielder this season.

==== 2011 season ====
Jenssen also played most of the matches in the 2011 season, but after playing 89 matches in a row for Tromsø he missed the match against Viking in August 2011 due to a suspension after three yellow cards. Jenssen scored his first Tippeligaen-goal in three years in the 3–1 win against Fredrikstad on 21 August 2011. He scored the first goal in the match after two minutes.

==== 2012 season ====
In the 2012 season, Jenssen was again playing every match until he had to skip the match against Sandnes Ulf in November 2012 due to an injury. This was the first time Jenssen was unable to play a match for Tromsø, since he became a regular in the first time in 2008. Tromsø's Miika Koppinen was placed on the bench in the 2012 Norwegian Football Cup Final, and Jenssen captained the side in the club's third Norwegian Football Cup final.

=== 1. FC Kaiserslautern ===
On 4 June 2013, he signed a three-year contract with 2. Bundesliga club 1. FC Kaiserslautern.

=== Groningen ===
On 7 June 2016, he signed with Dutch Eredivisie side FC Groningen.

In January 2018, Jenssen re-joined former club 1. FC Kaiserslautern on loan for the second half of the season.

=== Brann ===
Yttergård Jenssen signed with Brann on 11 August 2018 on a 2 years contract.

=== Return to Tromsø ===
Yttergård Jenssen signed with Tromsø on 18 January 2020 on a 4 years contract. In his first season back at the club, Jenssen and Tromsø's main goal was to achieve promotion back to the Eliteserien, after the club was relegated the season prior. After a solid campaign, Tromsø was in pole position for one of the two automatic promotion spots. On 22 November in a match against Raufoss, Tromsø came back from a losing position with a free kick goal from Jenssen in the extra time, ending the game 1–1, and at the same time securing their promotion.

As Tromsø started their pre-season ahead of the 2021 season, captain Simen Wangberg was sold, and Jenssen was appointed the new captain of the club. In September 2023, Jenssen extended his contract with two new years, until the end of the 2025 season.

In September 2025, Tromsø announced that ahead of his contract expiring after the season, Jenssen had signed a new one-year extension, keeping him at the club for the 2026 season. A month later, Yttergård Jennsen was named Player of the Month in the Eliteserien, his first time, for the months of August and September.

== International career ==
Jenssen first represented Norway at the under-16 level, and soon became a regular on Norwegian youth teams. He played 21 matches and scored two goals from under-16 level to under-19 level, and became the captain of the under-21 team in 2009. He played a total of 13 matches for the under-21 team.

In May 2010, Jenssen was selected for the Norwegian national team for the first time along with Jonathan Parr, as a replacement for Bjørn Helge Riise and John Arne Riise who attended Bjørn Helge's wedding. Jenssen made his debut for Norway when he started the match against Montenegro and played for 57 minutes. Parr and Jenssen were originally returning to the under-21 for a match against Finland U21 after the Montenegro-match, but they both returned to their clubs with injuries. Jenssen has since then been a regular in Egil Olsen's national team, and he has been a regular starter since he started the World Cup qualifier against Slovenia on 11 September 2012. Jenssen was awarded the Gold Watch after his 25th cap against Macedonia on 11 June 2013, and became the eighth footballer from Northern Norway to reach that milestone. Jenssen's last game for the national team came in a 3–0 loss against Germany in September 2016.

== Personal life ==
Jenssen comes from a family of footballers; his father Truls Jenssen, is a former Tromsø player and he has also coached Sogndal, Tromsdalen and Tromsø. Jenssen's youngest brother Ulrik Yttergård Jenssen is a fellow professional footballer, while their brother Markus won the Norwegian Youth Cup with Tromsø.

Jenssen married his girlfriend of eight years, Maria Evertsen Berg, in December 2012. His best man was Christer Johnsgård, a former footballer, who also worked at the Norwegian Broadcasting Corporation. The pair have two sons together.

== Career statistics ==
=== Club ===
As of 21 November 2026

Appearances by club, season and competition
Club	Season	League			National Cup (Note: Includes Norwegian Cup, DFB-Pokal, KNVB Cup)		Europe		Other		Total	
Club	Season	Division	Apps	Goals	Apps	Goals	Apps	Goals	Apps	Goals	Apps	Goals
Tromsø	2005	Tippeligaen	0	0	1	0	0	0	—		1	0
Tromsø	2006	Tippeligaen	6	0	1	1	—		—		7	1
Tromsø	2007	Tippeligaen	15	0	4	0	—		—		19	0
Tromsø	2008	Tippeligaen	20	2	4	1	—		—		24	3
Tromsø	2009	Tippeligaen	30	0	5	0	6 (Note: Appearances in UEFA Europa League)	0	—		41	0
Tromsø	2010	Tippeligaen	30	0	3	0	—		—		33	0
Tromsø	2011	Tippeligaen	29	1	4	0	4	1	—		37	2
Tromsø	2012	Tippeligaen	29	0	6	1	6	0	—		41	1
Tromsø	2013	Tippeligaen	12	1	1	1	0	0	—		13	2
Tromsø	Total		171	4	29	4	16	1	—		216	9
1. FC Kaiserslautern	2013–14	2. Bundesliga	23	2	3	1	—		—		26	3
1. FC Kaiserslautern	2014–15	2. Bundesliga	21	0	3	0	—		—		24	0
1. FC Kaiserslautern	2015–16	2. Bundesliga	31	7	0	0	—		—		31	7
1. FC Kaiserslautern	Total		75	9	6	1	—		—		81	10
Groningen	2016–17	Eredivisie	33	2	2	0	—		2 (Note: Appearances in the Eredivisie European competition playoffs)	0	37	2
Groningen	2017–18	Eredivisie	12	0	1	0	—		—		13	0
Groningen	Total		45	2	3	0	—		2	0	50	2
1. FC Kaiserslautern (loan)	2017–18	2. Bundesliga	14	0	0	0	—		—		14	0
Brann	2018	Eliteserien	12	0	0	0	—		—		12	0
Brann	2019	Eliteserien	26	3	4	0	2	0	—		32	3
Brann	Total		38	3	4	0	2	0	0	0	44	3
Brann 2	2019	3. divisjon	1	0	—		—		—		1	0
Tromsø	2020	1. divisjon	29	2	—		—		—		29	2
Tromsø	2021	Eliteserien	29	0	2	0	—		—		31	0
Tromsø	2022	Eliteserien	27	2	0	0	—		—		27	2
Tromsø	2023	Eliteserien	29	2	4	0	—		—		33	2
Tromsø	2024	Eliteserien	27	2	1	0	4 (Note: Appearances in UEFA Conference League)	0	—		32	2
Tromsø	2025	Eliteserien	30	2	2	0	—		—		32	2
Tromsø	2026	Eliteserien	26	1	3	1	5 (Note: Two appearances in UEFA Europa League and three appearances in UEFA Conference League)	0	—		34	2
Tromsø	Total		197	11	12	1	9	0	0	0	218	12
Career total			541	29	54	6	27	1	2	0	624	36

=== International ===
As of 4 September 2016

National team	Year	Apps	Goals
Norway	2010	5	0
Norway	2011	5	0
Norway	2012	9	0
Norway	2013	10	0
Norway	2014	5	0
Norway	2015	0	0
Norway	2016	5	0
Norway	Total	39	0

== Honours ==
Individual

- Eliteserien Player of the Month: August/September 2025, March/April 2026
