= Runar Norheim =

Norwegian footballer (born 2005)

Personal information
- Full name: Runar Robinsønn Norheim
- Date of birth: 14 February 2005 (age 21)
- Place of birth: Finnsnes, Norway
- Height: 1.75 m (5 ft 9 in)
- Position: Midfielder

Team information
- Current team: Nordsjælland
- Number: 23

Youth career
- –2016: Finnsnes
- 2017–2020: Varden

Senior career*
| Years | Team | Apps | (Gls) |
| 2020–2025 | Tromsø | 78 | (3) |
| 2021–2023 | → Tromsø 2 | 21 | (10) |
| 2025– | Nordsjælland | 36 | (7) |

International career^{‡}
| 2021 | Norway U16 | 2 | (0) |
| 2022 | Norway U17 | 4 | (0) |
| 2023 | Norway U18 | 8 | (0) |
| 2024 | Norway U19 | 5 | (0) |
| 2024–2025 | Norway U20 | 4 | (0) |
| 2025– | Norway U21 | 10 | (0) |
- * Club domestic league appearances and goals as of 18 October 2026 ‡ National team caps and goals as of 14 November 2026

Runar Robinsønn Norheim (born 14 February 2005) is a Norwegian footballer who plays as a midfielder for Nordsjælland.

== Club career ==
=== Tromsø ===
Norheim joined Tromsø in 2020, and was integrated into the first team, making his debut the same year. In doing so, he became the youngest Tromsø player ever. In May 2022, he scored a hat-trick in an 8–0 Norwegian Cup win against Ishavsbyen.

He signed a contract extension with Tromsø in September 2022, running through to 2024. In the same month, he was named by English newspaper The Guardian as one of the best players born in 2005 worldwide.

=== Nordsjælland ===
In August 2025, Nordheim signed a five-year contract with the Danish club Nordsjælland. The reported fee was around €2.5 million.

== International career ==
Norheim played his first international game for Norway with their U16 team in October 2021.

In 2024, after the Norwegian Under-19 team qualified for the UEFA Under-19 Euro 2024, Tromsø refused to let Norheim play in the tournament, as it clashed with several of their games at the same time.

== Career statistics ==
=== Club ===
As of 18 October 2026

| Club | Season | League | | | National Cup (Note: Including Norwegian Cup) | | Europe | | Total | |
| Club | Season | Division | Apps | Goals | Apps | Goals | Apps | Goals | Apps | Goals |
|---|---|---|---|---|---|---|---|---|---|---|
| Tromsø | 2020 | 1. divisjon | 3 | 0 | — | | — | | 3 | 0 |
| Tromsø | 2021 | Eliteserien | 1 | 0 | 0 | 0 | — | | 1 | 0 |
| Tromsø | 2022 | Eliteserien | 12 | 1 | 3 | 3 | — | | 15 | 4 |
| Tromsø | 2023 | Eliteserien | 14 | 0 | 3 | 0 | — | | 17 | 0 |
| Tromsø | 2024 | Eliteserien | 29 | 0 | 2 | 0 | 4 (Note: Appearances in UEFA Conference League) | 0 | 35 | 0 |
| Tromsø | 2025 | Eliteserien | 19 | 2 | 1 | 0 | — | | 20 | 2 |
| Tromsø | Total | | 78 | 3 | 9 | 3 | 4 | 0 | 91 | 6 |
| Tromsø 2 | 2021 | 3. divisjon | 5 | 3 | — | | — | | 5 | 3 |
| Tromsø 2 | 2022 | 3. divisjon | 10 | 4 | — | | — | | 10 | 4 |
| Tromsø 2 | 2023 | 3. divisjon | 6 | 3 | — | | — | | 6 | 3 |
| Tromsø 2 | Total | | 21 | 10 | — | | — | | 21 | 10 |
| Nordsjælland | 2025–26 | Danish Superliga | 25 | 5 | 4 | 1 | — | | 29 | 6 |
| Nordsjælland | 2026–27 | Danish Superliga | 11 | 2 | 0 | 0 | 6 | 2 | 17 | 4 |
| Nordsjælland | Total | | 36 | 7 | 4 | 1 | 6 | 2 | 46 | 10 |
| Career total | | | 146 | 20 | 13 | 4 | 10 | 2 | 158 | 26 |
