= 2024 Tromsø IL season =

Tromsø
2024 season
- Chairman: Helge Kræmer
- Manager: Jørgen Vik; Gard Holme
- Stadium: Romssa Arena
- Eliteserien: 13th
- Norwegian Cup: Third round
- UEFA Conference League: Third qualifying round
- Top goalscorer: League: Lasse Nordås (9); All: Lasse Nordås (13)
Home colours	Away colours

The 2024 season was Tromsø IL's 104th season in existence and the club's fourth consecutive season in the top flight of Norwegian football. The club competed in the 2024 Eliteserien as well as the 2024 Norwegian Football Cup and the qualifying stages for the 2024–25 UEFA Conference League.

Tromsø were inconsistent across the league season and finished 13th in the Eliteserien – avoiding the relegation play-off on goal difference. They fared slightly better in the Norwegian Football Cup as they reached the third round before losing to Vålerenga. Following a victory against KuPS of Finland in the second qualifying round for the UEFA Conference League, Tromsø were eliminated by Kilmarnock of Scotland.

== Background ==
Tromsø IL had had a strong season in 2023. It was their third season in the Eliteserien after promotion in 2020 and the club finished third in the league to qualify for the 2024–25 UEFA Conference League qualifying stages.

== Season overview ==
Tromsø started the season with four consecutive defeats before recording a home win against Odd. In between that was a run to the third round of the 2024 Norwegian Football Cup in which they lost to Vålerenga after extra time.

In the second qualifying round of the UEFA Conference League, the club was drawn against KuPS of Finland. Goals from Lasse Nordås and Jens Hjertø-Dahl helped them to win both legs as they won 2–0 on aggregate. They then faced Kilmarnock of Scotland in the third qualifying round but, despite leading the first leg 2–1 away from home through goals from Jakob Napoleon Romsaas, they drew the match and then lost 1–0 at home as they were eliminated 3–2 on aggregate.

Throughout the rest of the year, their from remained inconsistent. They only twice managed to string together a run of three consecutive matches without defeat in the league and ended up finishing 13th with 33 points, avoiding a relegation play-off on goal difference.

== Competitions ==
=== Overview ===
Competition	First match	Last match	Starting round	Final position	Record							
Competition	First match	Last match	Starting round	Final position	Pld	W	D	L	GF	GA	GD	Win %
Eliteserien	1 April 2024	1 December 2024	Matchday 1	13th	30	9	6	15	34	44	−10	30.00
Norwegian Cup	10 April 2024	1 May 2024	First round	Third round	3	2	0	1	12	1	+11	66.67
UEFA Conference League	25 July 2024	15 August 2024	Second qualifying round	Third qualifying round	4	2	1	1	4	3	+1	50.00
Total					37	13	7	17	50	48	+2	35.14

Last updated: 1 December 2024
Source: Soccerway

=== Eliteserien ===
Pos	Team	Pld	W	D	L	GF	GA	GD	Pts	Qualification or relegation
11	Kristiansund	30	8	10	12	32	45	−13	34	
12	HamKam	30	8	9	13	34	39	−5	33	
13	Tromsø	30	9	6	15	34	44	−10	33	
14	Haugesund (O)	30	9	6	15	29	46	−17	33	Qualification for the relegation play-offs
15	Lillestrøm (R)	30	7	3	20	33	63	−30	24	Relegation to First Division

Source: Football Association of Norway (in Norwegian)
Rules for classification: 1) Points; 2) Goal difference; 3) Goals scored; 4) Head-to-head points; 5) Head-to-head goal difference; 6) Head-to-head goals scored.
(O) Play-off winners; (R) Relegated

The league fixtures were announced on 20 December 2023.

Tromsø's score is shown first in each case.

Tromsø in the 2024 Eliteserien
Date	Venue	Opponents	Score	Tromsø scorers	Att.	Ref.
1 April 2024	Romssa Arena, Tromsø (H)	Brann	2–4	Nordås 65', 73'	4,890	
14 April 2024	Romssa Arena, Tromsø (H)	Haugesund	0–1		4,031	
21 April 2024	Kristiansund Stadion, Kristiansund (A)	Kristiansund	0–1		3,339	
28 April 2024	Romssa Arena, Tromsø (H)	Sarpsborg 08	0–3		4,873	
5 May 2024	Viking Stadion, Stavanger (A)	Viking	1–2	R. Y. Jenssen 54'	10,093	
12 May 2024	Romssa Arena, Tromsø (H)	Odd	4–0	R. Y. Jenssen 49', Erlien 51', Antonsen 70', Norheim 74'	3,637	
16 May 2024	Aspmyra Stadion, Bodø (A)	Bodø/Glimt	0–4		8,257	
20 May 2024	Romssa Arena, Tromsø (H)	Rosenborg	3–2	Erlien 49', Skjærvik 51', Hjertø-Dahl 77'	4,713	
25 May 2024	Fredrikstad Stadion, Fredrikstad (A)	Fredrikstad	0–0		8,671	
29 May 2024	Romssa Arena, Tromsø (H)	Fredrikstad	3–0	Nordås 17', 80' (pen.), Romsaas 34'	4,501	
2 June 2024	Romssa Arena, Tromsø (H)	Lillestrøm	1–2	Guddal 66'	5,154	
28 June 2024	Romssa Arena, Tromsø (H)	Molde	0–2		4,333	
3 July 2024	Sandefjord Arena, Sandefjord (A)	Sandefjord	2–1	Nordås 6', Romsaas 37'	3,307	
7 July 2024	Briskeby Stadion, Hamar (A)	HamKam	0–0		4,406	
13 July 2024	Romssa Arena, Tromsø (H)	KFUM Oslo	1–2	Romsaas 63'	5,267	
21 July 2024	Marienlyst Stadion, Drammen (A)	Strømsgodset	1–0	Nordås 49'	4,607	
28 July 2024	Romssa Arena, Tromsø (H)	Kristiansund	0–0		4,006	
4 August 2024	Lerkendal Stadion, Trondheim (A)	Rosenborg	0–1		11,602	
18 August 2024	KFUM Arena, Oslo (A)	KFUM Oslo	1–0	Cornic 79'	2,640	
25 August 2024	Åråsen Stadion, Lillestrøm (A)	Lillestrøm	1–0	Erlien 23'	7,315	
1 September 2024	Romssa Arena, Tromsø (H)	Viking	2–2	Erlien 16', Jenssen 31'	4,807	
15 September 2024	Skagerak Arena, Skien (A)	Odd	0–1		4,078	
22 September 2024	Romssa Arena, Tromsø (H)	Sandefjord	3–0	Nordås 25', Erlien 36', Barry 44'	3,735	
28 September 2024	Aker Stadion, Molde (A)	Molde	3–5	Cornic 56', 85', Edvardsson 90+4'	6,090	
19 October 2024	Romssa Arena, Tromsø (H)	Bodø/Glimt	0–0		6,991	
27 October 2024	Brann Stadion, Bergen (A)	Brann	0–4		15,517	
3 November 2024	Romssa Arena, Tromsø (H)	HamKam	3–3	Erlien 30' (pen.), 67' (pen.), Nordås 51'	4,052	
10 November 2024	Haugesund Stadion, Haugesund (A)	Haugesund	0–2		4,531	
23 November 2024	Romssa Arena, Tromsø (H)	Strømsgodset	2–0	Romsaas 42', Erlien 55'	3,991	
1 December 2024	Sarpsborg Stadion, Sarpsborg (A)	Sarpsborg 08	1–2	Nordås 65'	3,897	

=== Norwegian Football Cup ===
Tromsø's score is shown first in each case.

Tromsø in the 2024 Norwegian Football Cup
Date	Round	Venue	Opponents	Score	Tromsø scorers	Att.	Ref.
10 April 2024	First round	Blåbyhallen, Sortland (A)	Sortland	6–0	Erlien 2' (pen.), 74' (pen.), Nordås 38', 39', 59', Romsaas 54'	1,752	
24 April 2024	Second round	Fløyabanen, Tromsø (A)	Fløya	6–0	Johnsgård 13', 37', Hjertø-Dahl 51', 81', 90', Winther 90+4' (pen.)	645	
1 May 2024	Third round	Intility Arena, Oslo (A)	Vålerenga	0–1 (a.e.t.)		7,135	

=== UEFA Conference League ===
Tromsø's score is shown first in each case.

Tromsø in the 2024–25 Conference League
Date	Round	Venue	Opponents	Score	Tromsø scorers	Att.	Ref.
25 July 2024	Second qualifying round first leg	Kuopio Football Stadium, Kuopio (A)	KuPS	1–0	Nordås 54'	2,678	
1 August 2024	Second qualifying round second leg	Romssa Arena, Tromsø (H)	KuPS	1–0	Hjertø-Dahl 29'	8,083	
8 August 2024	Third qualifying round first leg	Rugby Park, Kilmarnock (A)	Kilmarnock	2–2	Romsaas 50', 64'	6,995	
15 August 2024	Third qualifying round second leg	Romssa Arena, Tromsø (H)	Kilmarnock	0–1		5,891	

== Players ==
The squad used by Tromsø during the 2024 season.

No.	Pos.	Name
1	GK	Jakob Haugaard
2	DF	Leo Cornic
4	DF	Vetle Skjærvik
5	DF	Anders Jenssen
6	MF	Jens Hjertø-Dahl
8	MF	Kent-Are Antonsen
9	FW	Lasse Nordås
10	MF	Jakob Napoleon Romsaas
11	MF	Ruben Yttergård Jenssen
12	GK	Simon Thomas
14	DF	Mamadou Thierno Barry
15	FW	Vegard Erlien
16	DF	Miika Koskela
17	MF	Yaw Paintsil
19	MF	Heine Åsen Larsen
20	MF	David Edvardsson
21	DF	Tobias Guddal
22	FW	Frederik Christensen
23	MF	Runar Norheim
25	DF	Lasse Nilsen
28	DF	Christophe Psyché
29	FW	Sean Nilsen-Modebe
30	DF	Isak Vådebu
—	DF	Oskar Opsahl

== Transfers ==
=== Winter ===
In:

Pos.	Name	From
DF	Jesper Robertsen	Mjøndalen (loan return)
DF	Vetle Skjærvik	Lillestrøm
DF	Mamadou Thierno Barry	Academie Mawade Wade
MF	Markus Johnsgård	Raufoss
DF	Tobias Guddal	Bryne
DF	Isak Vik	Tromsdalen (loan return)
FW	Yoro Ba	Academie Bloc 16 Diamamague

Out:

Pos.	Name	To
DF	Oskar Opsahl	Egersund (loan)
DF	Jostein Gundersen	Bodø/Glimt
DF	Tobias Vonheim Norbye	Alta (loan)
DF	Niklas Vesterlund	Utrecht
DF	Dadi Gaye	Strømsgodset (loan)
MF	Tobias Hafstad	Tromsdalen
DF	El Hadji Malick Diouf	Slavia Praha
FW	Maï Traoré	Viking (return from loan)
GK	Marius Tollefsen	released
GK	Mats Trige	Alta (loan)

=== Summer ===
In:

Pos.	Name	From
DF	Leo Cornic	Rosenborg
MF	Heine Åsen Larsen	Egersund
MF	David Edvardsson	Malmö
FW	Frederik Christensen	Hobro
FW	Sean Nilsen-Modebe	Ull/Kisa
GK	Håvar Jenssen	Fredrikstad (loan)
DF	Oskar Opsahl	Egersund (return from loan)

Out:

Pos.	Name	To.
DF	Jesper Robertsen	Sogndal (loan)
MF	Felix Winther	Federicia
MF	Markus Johnsgård	HamKam (loan)
MF	Sakarias Opsahl	Brann
DF	Isak Vik	Bryne (loan)
FW	Yoro Ba	Sogndal (loan)
DF	Isak Vådebu	Levanger (loan)
GK	Håvar Jenssen	Fredrikstad (return from loan)
DF	Dadi Gaye	KFUM (loan)
