= David Edvardsson =

Swedish footballer (born 2002)

Personal information
- Full name: David Mikael Edvardsson
- Date of birth: 5 March 2002 (age 24)
- Height: 1.74 m (5 ft 9 in)
- Position: Midfielder

Team information
- Current team: Tromsø
- Number: 5

Youth career
- –2018: Grebbestads IF
- 2019–2020: Malmö FF

Senior career*
| Years | Team | Apps | (Gls) |
| 2018 | Grebbestads IF | 10 | (0) |
| 2021–2024 | Malmö FF | 0 | (0) |
| 2021 | → Jammerbugt FC (loan) | 12 | (0) |
| 2022 | → Värnamo (loan) | 7 | (0) |
| 2023–2024 | → Landskrona BoIS (loan) | 43 | (3) |
| 2024– | Tromsø | 55 | (5) |

International career^{‡}
| 2017–2019 | Sweden U17 | 17 | (0) |
| 2019–2021 | Sweden U19 | 6 | (1) |
| 2021–2022 | Sweden U21 | 3 | (0) |
- * Club domestic league appearances and goals as of 31 August 2026 ‡ National team caps and goals as of 17:23, 16 October 2024 (UTC)

David Edvardsson (born 5 March 2002) is a Swedish footballer who plays as a midfielder for Tromsø IL in the Norwegian Eliteserien.

== Career ==
He started his career in Grebbestads IF and made his senior debut for that club in the 2018 Division 1. Edvardsson had made his international youth debut for Sweden U15 in 2017, and progressed through the youth national teams, among others participating in the 2019 UEFA European Under-17 Championship.

Ahead of the 2021 Edvardsson was given a first-team contract with Malmö. In 2021 and 2022 he was loaned out twice, to Jammerbugt FC and IFK Värnamo, respectively. Ahead of the 2022 season he had aimed to play for Malmö, but for Värnamo he made his Allsvenskan debut in August 2022 against Djurgården. He was also able to break into the Swedish U21 national team.

Another loan followed in the 2023 season, this time to Superettan club Landskrona BoIS. He was benched several times during the first phase of his loan, but ended up playing most games. The loan was prolonged throughout 2024. In the 2024 Superettan, Edvardsson was used as a midfield anchor as Landskrona dominated and led the table with a third of the season being played. During the summer of 2024, multiple clubs were reported as interested in signing Edvardsson. In Sweden, Sirius were interested as well as Landskrona itself. In mid-August, it was announced that Tromsø IL bought the player.

== Career statistics ==
As of 31 August 2026

Appearances and goals by club, season and competition
| Club | Season | League | | | National Cup (Note: Includes Svenska Cupen, Norwegian Cup) | | Europe | | Total | |
| Club | Season | Division | Apps | Goals | Apps | Goals | Apps | Goals | Apps | Goals |
|---|---|---|---|---|---|---|---|---|---|---|
| Grebbestads IF | 2018 | Ettan Fotboll | 10 | 0 | 0 | 0 | — | | 10 | 0 |
| Malmö FF | 2021 | Allsvenskan | 0 | 0 | 0 | 0 | 0 | 0 | 0 | 0 |
| Malmö FF | 2022 | Allsvenskan | 0 | 0 | 0 | 0 | 0 | 0 | 0 | 0 |
| Malmö FF | Total | | 0 | 0 | 0 | 0 | 0 | 0 | 0 | 0 |
| Jammerbugt FC (loan) | 2021-22 | Danish 1st Division | 12 | 0 | 0 | 0 | — | | 12 | 0 |
| IFK Värnamo (loan) | 2022 | Allsvenskan | 7 | 0 | 1 | 0 | — | | 8 | 0 |
| Landskrona BoIS (loan) | 2023 | Superettan | 26 | 2 | 4 | 1 | — | | 30 | 3 |
| Landskrona BoIS (loan) | 2024 | Superettan | 17 | 1 | 3 | 0 | — | | 20 | 1 |
| Landskrona BoIS (loan) | Total | | 43 | 3 | 7 | 1 | — | | 50 | 4 |
| Tromsø | 2024 | Eliteserien | 10 | 1 | 0 | 0 | 0 | 0 | 10 | 1 |
| Tromsø | 2025 | Eliteserien | 27 | 3 | 4 | 0 | — | | 31 | 3 |
| Tromsø | 2026 | Eliteserien | 18 | 1 | 1 | 0 | 6 (Note: Two appearances in UEFA Europa League, four appearances in UEFA Conference League) | 0 | 25 | 1 |
| Tromsø | Total | | 55 | 5 | 5 | 0 | 6 | 0 | 66 | 5 |
| Career total | | | 127 | 8 | 13 | 1 | 6 | 0 | 146 | 9 |
