= Abubacarr Sedi Kinteh =

Gambian footballer

Sedi Kinteh
Personal information
- Full name: Abubacarr Sedi Kinteh
- Date of birth: 30 November 2006 (age 19)
- Place of birth: Gambia
- Height: 1.86 m (6 ft 1 in)
- Position: Centre-back

Team information
- Current team: Al-Ahli

Youth career
- –2025: Academy Mawade Wade

Senior career*
Years	Team	Apps	(Gls)
2025	Tromsø 2	3	(0)
2025–2026	Tromsø	30	(1)
2026–	Al-Ahli	0	(0)

International career^{‡}
2025–	Gambia	1	(0)
- * Club domestic league appearances and goals as of 21 June 2026 ‡ National team caps and goals as of 21 June 2026

Abubacarr Sedi Kinteh (born 30 November 2006) is a Gambian who plays as a centre-back for Al-Ahli in the Saudi Pro League and the Gambian national team.

== Club career ==
=== Tromsø ===
In February 2025 Tromsø brought in Kinteh and fellow defender Massamba M’Baye for a trial period, both from Tromsø's partner academy Mawade Wade, located in Senegal. After the trial period, only Kinteh was offered a contract with the club, and in early March he signed a five-year contract, lasting until the end of the 2029 season. His first game for the club came in the Norwegian Cup against Hamna, before his first league start came a month later, against KFUM Oslo.

Kinteh quickly became an integral part of Tromsø's 2025 season, and after only three games for Tromsø in Eliteserien Norwegian media reported that Tromsø had declined an offer of €5 million for the 18 year old Kinteh. The offer would have been a transfer record for Tromsø if they had accepted it.

In June, Kinteh was named young player of the month of May by Norsk Toppfotball. They cited his good left foot, speed, and duelling strength as reasons why he won.

=== Al-Ahli ===
In June 2026, Al Ahli Signed Kinteh for €6.50 million on a 5 Year Contract.

== International career ==
In August 2025, Kinteh was called up to be part of the squad for Gambia's World Cup qualification matches against Kenya and Burundi. He got his debut on 10 October, 2025, in a 4–3 2026 FIFA World Cup qualification loss to Gabon.

== Career statistics ==
=== Club ===
As of 21 June 2026

Appearances and goals by club, season and competition
Club	Season	League			National Cup		Total	
Club	Season	Division	Apps	Goals	Apps	Goals	Apps	Goals
Tromsø 2	2025	3. divisjon	3	0	0	0	3	0
Tromsø	2025	Eliteserien	21	1	4	0	25	1
Tromsø	2026	Eliteserien	9	0	1	0	10	0
Tromsø	Total		30	1	5	0	35	1
Al-Ahli	2026–27	Saudi Pro League	0	0	0	0	0	0
Career total			33	1	5	0	38	1

== Honours ==
Individual

- Eliteserien Young Player of the Month: May 2025
