= Jesper Robertsen =

Norwegian footballer (born 2004)

Personal information
- Full name: Jesper Bergset Robersen
- Date of birth: 23 March 2004 (age 22)
- Place of birth: Oslo, Norway
- Height: 1.75 m (5 ft 9 in)
- Position: Defender

Team information
- Current team: Hødd
- Number: 24

Youth career
- 2010–2020: Tromsø

Senior career*
Years	Team	Apps	(Gls)
2020–2025	Tromsø	19	(0)
2021–2025	Tromsø 2	28	(3)
2023	→ Mjøndalen (loan)	5	(0)
2023	→ Mjøndalen 2 (loan)	3	(0)
2024	→ Sogndal (loan)	11	(0)
2024	→ Sogndal 2 (loan)	1	(0)
2025	→ Hødd (loan)	5	(0)
2025–	Hødd	43	(2)

International career^{‡}
2020	Norway U16	3	(1)
2021	Norway U17	2	(0)
2023	Norway U19	2	(0)
- * Club domestic league appearances and goals as of 14 November 2026 ‡ National team caps and goals as of 23 February 2023

Jesper Bergset Robertsen (born 23 March 2004) is a Norwegian footballer who plays as a defender for Hødd.

== Early life ==
Born in Oslo, Robertsen moved to Tromsø at the age of six. Immediately after moving he started playing football for Tromsø at their different youth levels before advancing to the senior squad at the age of sixteen.

== Career ==
=== Tromsø ===
After training with Tromsø's senior squad for several months his first game for the club came in October 2020 against HamKam in the 1. divisjon, coming on as a substitute for Eric Kitolano in the additional time. His first professional contract was signed a month later, lasting three years. Despite being injured for almost the entirety of the 2022 season, Robertsen signed a new contract with Tromsø in September 2022, lasting until the end of the 2025 season.

On deadline day in the summer transfer window of 2023 Robertsen signed a loan deal with Mjøndalen. The loan lasted until the end of the season. Robertsen's second loan spell came at the latter half of the 2024 season, this time going to Sogndal.

=== Hødd ===
In 2025, as Tromsø entered their mid-season break, Hødd confirmed in late May that Robertsen had signed a month-long loan with the club.

Only days after his loan spell ended, the club confirmed that they had signed him on a permanent deal, with a contract stretching throughout the 2026 season.

== International career ==
Robertsen has appeared for Norway's U16, U17, and U19 team. His only international goal came against Wales U16 in 2020.

== Career statistics ==
As of 7 July 2025

Appearances and goals by club, season and competition
Club	Season	League			National Cup		Europe		Total	
Club	Season	Division	Apps	Goals	Apps	Goals	Apps	Goals	Apps	Goals
Tromsø	2020	1. divisjon	3	0	—		—		3	0
Tromsø	2021	Eliteserien	3	0	0	0	—		3	0
Tromsø	2022	Eliteserien	0	0	0	0	—		0	0
Tromsø	2023	Eliteserien	4	0	4	0	—		8	0
Tromsø	2024	Eliteserien	9	0	2	0	2 (Note: Appearances in UEFA Conference League)	0	13	0
Tromsø	2025	Eliteserien	0	0	2	0	—		2	0
Tromsø	Total		19	0	8	0	2	0	29	0
Tromsø 2	2021	3. divisjon	7	1	—		—		7	1
Tromsø 2	2022	3. divisjon	7	1	—		—		7	1
Tromsø 2	2023	3. divisjon	9	1	—		—		9	1
Tromsø 2	2024	4. divisjon	1	0	—		—		1	0
Tromsø 2	2025	3. divisjon	4	0	—		—		4	0
Tromsø 2	Total		28	3	—		—		28	3
Mjøndalen (loan)	2023	1. divisjon	5	0	0	0	—		5	0
Mjøndalen 2 (loan)	2023	3. divisjon	3	0	—		—		3	0
Sogndal (loan)	2024	1. divisjon	11	0	0	0	—		11	0
Sogndal 2 (loan)	2024	4. divisjon	1	0	—		—		1	0
Hødd (loan)	2025	1. divisjon	5	0	0	0	—		5	0
Hødd	2025	1. divisjon	0	0	0	0	—		0	0
Career total			72	3	8	0	2	0	82	3
