= Kent-Are Antonsen =

Norwegian footballer (born 1995)

Personal information
- Date of birth: 12 February 1995 (age 31)
- Place of birth: Storsteinnes, Norway
- Height: 1.72 m (5 ft 8 in)
- Position: Midfielder

Team information
- Current team: Strømsgodset
- Number: 22

Youth career
- –2010: Storsteinnes
- 2011–2012: Tromsø

Senior career*
Years	Team	Apps	(Gls)
2010–2011	Storsteinnes		
2011	→ Nordkjosbotn (loan)		
2013–2026	Tromsø	307	(28)
2025	→ IFK Värnamo (loan)	10	(0)
2026–	Strømsgodset	27	(1)

International career^{‡}
2010	Norway U15	4	(0)
2011	Norway U16	10	(0)
2012	Norway U17	9	(0)
2012–2013	Norway U18	12	(0)
- * Club domestic league appearances and goals as of 14 November 2026 ‡ National team caps and goals as of 2 February 2024

Kent-Are Antonsen (born 12 February 1995) is a Norwegian professional footballer who plays as a midfielder for Norwegian First Division club Strømsgodset.

== Club career ==
=== Early career ===
Antonsen was born in Storsteinnes. He began his career with Storsteinnes IL, the club from his hometown, where he made his debut in the Norwegian Fifth Division. In 2011, he joined Nordkjosbotn on loan, competing in the Norwegian Third Division.

=== Tromsø ===
In the summer of 2011, Antonsen signed with Tromsø and was initially assigned to the club's youth team. He made his Eliteserien debut on 29 June 2013, coming on as a substitute for Lars Gunnar Johnsen in a 3–1 away defeat to Strømsgodset. His first start came on 25 August in a 1–0 loss against Haugesund, where he received praise from teammates Miika Koppinen and Jarosław Fojut for his performance. On 19 September, he made his UEFA Europa League debut, replacing Koppinen in a 3–0 loss to Tottenham Hotspur. At the end of the season, Tromsø was relegated to the Norwegian First Division. On 3 December 2013, Antonsen signed a new contract with the club, extending his stay for three more seasons.

On 26 October 2014, Tromsø secured promotion back to the Eliteserien with a 1–0 home victory over Fredrikstad, ensuring a second-place finish with one match remaining. Antonsen scored his first Eliteserien goal—and his first goal for Tromsø—on 5 June 2015 in a 2–0 home win against Molde. Later that year, after helping the club secure its top-flight status, he signed a contract extension on 10 December, committing to Tromsø until the end of 2018.

His steady presence in the squad earned him another contract extension on 20 March 2018, securing his stay until December 2020. Two years later, on 24 January 2020, he extended his contract once more, committing to the club for an additional four years.

Continuing his long association with Tromsø, Antonsen signed a new three-year contract with the club on 4 January 2024.

On 23 July 2025 Antonsen was loaned out to IFK Värnamo until the end of the year, with an option to sign permanently after the season.

=== Strømsgodset ===
After Antonsen returned from his loan at IFK Värnamo, his contract with Tromsø was terminated so that Antonsen could find himself a new permanent club. Then, on 9 March 2026, Strømsgodset announced that they had signed him on a two-year contract.

== Career statistics ==
As of 18 October 2026

Appearances and goals by club, season and competition
Club	Season	League			National Cup		Europe		Total	
Club	Season	Division	Apps	Goals	Apps	Goals	Apps	Goals	Apps	Goals
Tromsø	2013	Eliteserien	9	0	0	0	4 (Note: Appearances in UEFA Europa League)	0	13	0
Tromsø	2014	1. divisjon	26	0	2	0	0	0	28	0
Tromsø	2015	Eliteserien	28	3	2	0	—		30	3
Tromsø	2016	Eliteserien	24	1	3	1	—		27	2
Tromsø	2017	Eliteserien	25	1	2	0	—		27	1
Tromsø	2018	Eliteserien	29	5	3	0	—		32	5
Tromsø	2019	Eliteserien	27	1	1	0	—		28	1
Tromsø	2020	1. divisjon	27	11	—		—		27	11
Tromsø	2021	Eliteserien	16	1	2	2	—		18	3
Tromsø	2022	Eliteserien	24	2	2	0	—		26	2
Tromsø	2023	Eliteserien	29	1	4	1	—		33	2
Tromsø	2024	Eliteserien	30	1	3	0	4 (Note: Appearances in UEFA Conference League)	0	37	1
Tromsø	2025	Eliteserien	13	1	1	0	—		14	1
Tromsø	Total		307	28	25	4	8	0	340	32
IFK Värnamo (loan)	2025	Allsvenskan	10	0	0	0	—		10	0
Strømsgodset	2026	1. divisjon	24	1	0	0	—		24	1
Career total			341	29	25	4	8	0	374	33

== Honours ==
Individual

- Eliteserien Goal of the Month: May 2025
