= Simon Thomas (soccer) =

Canadian soccer player

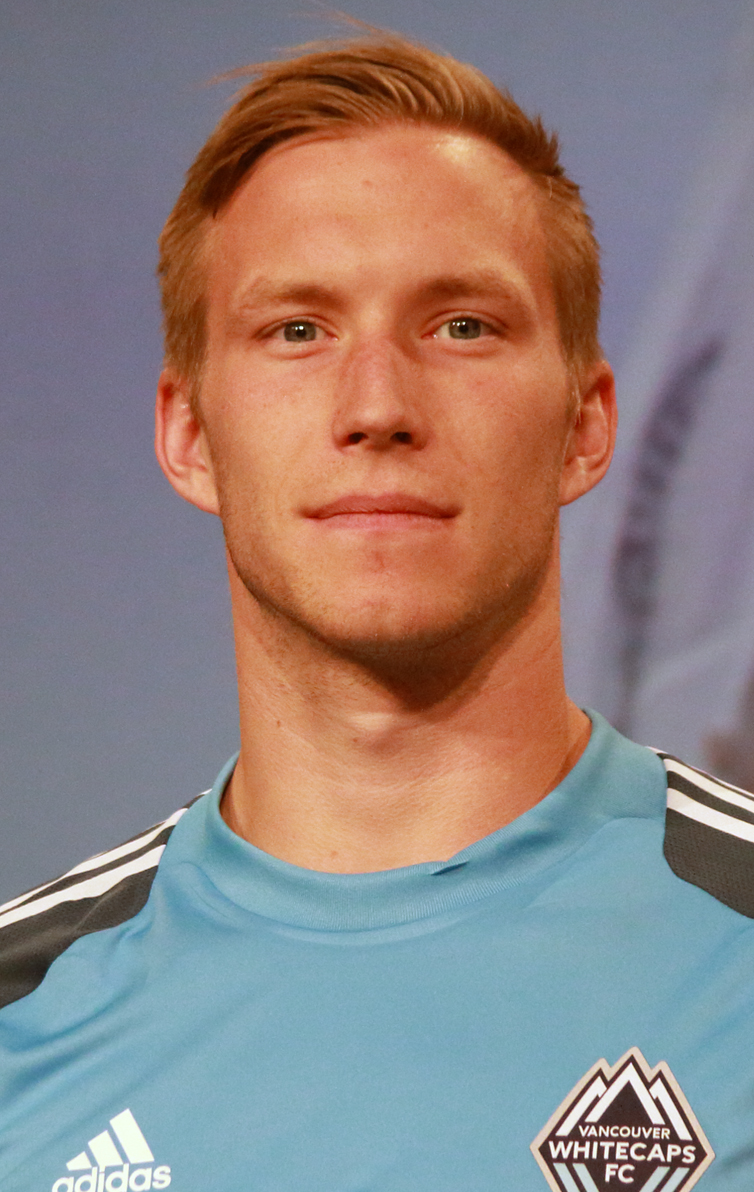
- Thomas with Vancouver Whitecaps in 2013

Personal information
- Full name: Simon Edmund Thomas
- Date of birth: April 12, 1990 (age 36)
- Place of birth: Victoria, British Columbia, Canada
- Height: 1.91 m (6 ft 3 in)
- Position: Goalkeeper

Team information
- Current team: Tromsdalen
- Number: 1

Youth career
- Bays United SC
- 2006–2007: Metro Victoria United

Senior career*
| Years | Team | Apps | (Gls) |
| 2008–2009 | Whitecaps Residency | 19 | (0) |
| 2008–2010 | Vancouver Whitecaps | 1 | (0) |
| 2011–2012 | Huddersfield Town | 0 | (0) |
| 2013 | Vancouver Whitecaps FC U-23 | 6 | (0) |
| 2013 | Vancouver Whitecaps FC | 0 | (0) |
| 2013 | → FC Edmonton (loan) | 0 | (0) |
| 2014 | Calgary Foothills | 0 | (0) |
| 2014 | Newport County | 0 | (0) |
| 2015 | Strømmen | 28 | (0) |
| 2016–2018 | Bodø/Glimt | 17 | (0) |
| 2016–2017 | Bodø/Glimt 2 | 7 | (0) |
| 2018 | Kongsvinger | 5 | (0) |
| 2018 | Kongsvinger 2 | 1 | (0) |
| 2018 | Strømmen | 15 | (0) |
| 2019 | KFUM Oslo 2 | 7 | (0) |
| 2019–2020 | KFUM Oslo | 14 | (0) |
| 2020 | Sarpsborg 08 | 1 | (0) |
| 2021–2025 | Tromsø | 5 | (0) |
| 2021–2025 | Tromsø 2 | 28 | (0) |
| 2026– | Tromsdalen | 23 | (0) |

International career^{‡}
| 2013–2017 | Canada | 8 | (0) |
- * Club domestic league appearances and goals as of October 25, 2026 ‡ National team caps and goals as of October 8, 2017

Simon Edmund Thomas (born April 12, 1990) is a Canadian professional soccer player who plays as a goalkeeper for Tromsdalen. Thomas has played for clubs in Canada, England, Wales and Norway.

== Club career ==
=== Vancouver Whitecaps ===
Thomas played with the Vancouver Whitecaps Residency squad in the team's first USL Premier Development League season in 2008, before being called up to the senior Vancouver Whitecaps side. He spent the 2009 season back in the PDL playing for the Vancouver Whitecaps Residency squad, before being recalled to the senior Whitecaps squad for the 2010 season.

Thomas made his professional debut on September 11, 2010 against Crystal Palace Baltimore, coming on as a late substitute for Jay Nolly.

=== Huddersfield ===
On August 5, 2011, after a successful trial period, he signed a one-year contract with English side Huddersfield Town. He left the club in June 2012, after not being offered a new contract by the manager, Simon Grayson. He did not make a single first team appearance for the club.

=== Calgary Foothills ===
Thomas spent three months playing a series of exhibition games for Calgary Foothills in 2014.

=== Newport Country ===
In August 2014 Thomas joined Football League Two club Newport County on a short contract to cover injuries. He left the club September 1, 2014 having not made a first team appearance, though he was regularly on the substitutes bench for League Two matches.

=== Strømmen ===
Thomas signed a contract with OBOS-ligaen club Strømmen prior to the 2015 season. As the first choice goalkeeper, he started 28 of the club's 30 matches in 2015, and broke club records for fewest goals against, and most shutouts in a season.

=== Bodø/Glimt ===
In November 2015 Thomas joined Tippeligaen club Bodø/Glimt on a three-year deal.

=== Kongsvinger ===
In early 2018, Thomas joined Kongsvinger in the OBOS-ligaen.

After only a few months with Kongsvinger, Thomas switched to fellow 2nd tier side Strømmen, where he played in 2015.

=== KFUM Oslo ===
On February 18, 2019, he signed with newly promoted Norwegian First Division club KFUM-Kameratene Oslo.

=== Sarpsborg 08 ===
In September 2020, Thomas would sign with Eliteserien club Sarpsborg 08.

=== Tromsø ===
Before the 2021 season Thomas signed with another Eliteserien club, Tromsø. In early 2024 he signed a contract extension, keeping him at the club until the end of the 2025 season. After not appearing for the first team at all in the 2025 season, and only playing for the second team, Thomas' contract was not extended, and he left the club after the season.

=== Tromsdalen ===
Ahead of the 2026 season, Thomas signed a one-year contract with Tromsdalen in the Norwegian Second Division.

== International career ==
Thomas received his first call up to the Canada Under-23 squad on the March 9, 2012, for the 2012 CONCACAF Men's Olympic Qualifying Tournament.

Thomas made his senior team debut on January 26, 2013, in a friendly against Denmark as a second half sub for Lars Hirschfeld, the game ended as a 4–0 defeat. Days later he played the full 90 minutes and kept a clean sheet in a 0–0 draw with the United States. On June 27, 2013, Thomas was listed as a part of the confirmed 23-man squad for Colin Miller's Canada squad for 2013 CONCACAF Gold Cup.

After becoming the first choice goalkeeper for Strømmen, Thomas was listed as part of the 23 man roster for a friendly against Ghana, as well as 2018 World Cup Qualifiers against Honduras and El Salvador.

== Career statistics ==
As of October 25, 2026

Appearances and goals by club, season and competition
| Club | Season | League | | | National Cup (Note: Includes Norwegian Cup) | | Total | |
| Club | Season | Division | Apps | Goals | Apps | Goals | Apps | Goals |
|---|---|---|---|---|---|---|---|---|
| Vancouver Whitecaps | 2010 | USSF Division 2 | 1 | 0 | 0 | 0 | 1 | 0 |
| Huddersfield | 2011–12 | League One | 0 | 0 | 0 | 0 | 0 | 0 |
| Vancouver Whitecaps FC | 2013 | MLS | 0 | 0 | 0 | 0 | 0 | 0 |
| FC Edmonton (loan) | 2013 | NASL | 0 | 0 | 0 | 0 | 0 | 0 |
| Newport County | 2014–15 | League Two | 0 | 0 | 0 | 0 | 0 | 0 |
| Strømmen | 2015 | 1. divisjon | 28 | 0 | 4 | 0 | 32 | 0 |
| Bodø/Glimt | 2016 | Eliteserien | 9 | 0 | 4 | 0 | 13 | 0 |
| Bodø/Glimt | 2017 | 1. divisjon | 8 | 0 | 1 | 0 | 9 | 0 |
| Bodø/Glimt | Total | | 17 | 0 | 5 | 0 | 22 | 0 |
| Bodø/Glimt 2 | 2016 | 3. divisjon | 4 | 0 | — | | 4 | 0 |
| Bodø/Glimt 2 | 2017 | 4. divisjon | 3 | 0 | — | | 3 | 0 |
| Bodø/Glimt 2 | Total | | 7 | 0 | — | | 7 | 0 |
| Kongsvinger | 2018 | 1. divisjon | 5 | 0 | 1 | 0 | 6 | 0 |
| Kongsvinger 2 | 2018 | 4. divisjon | 1 | 0 | — | | 1 | 0 |
| Strømmen | 2018 | 1. divisjon | 15 | 0 | 0 | 0 | 15 | 0 |
| KFUM Oslo 2 | 2019 | 4. divisjon | 7 | 0 | — | | 7 | 0 |
| KFUM Oslo | 2019 | 1. divisjon | 7 | 0 | 3 | 0 | 10 | 0 |
| KFUM Oslo | 2020 | 1. divisjon | 7 | 0 | — | | 7 | 0 |
| KFUM Oslo | Total | | 14 | 0 | 3 | 0 | 17 | 0 |
| Sarpsborg 08 | 2020 | Eliteserien | 1 | 0 | — | | 1 | 0 |
| Tromsø | 2021 | Eliteserien | 0 | 0 | 1 | 0 | 1 | 0 |
| Tromsø | 2022 | Eliteserien | 1 | 0 | 3 | 0 | 4 | 0 |
| Tromsø | 2023 | Eliteserien | 3 | 0 | 4 | 0 | 7 | 0 |
| Tromsø | 2024 | Eliteserien | 1 | 0 | 2 | 0 | 3 | 0 |
| Tromsø | 2025 | Eliteserien | 0 | 0 | 0 | 0 | 0 | 0 |
| Tromsø | Total | | 5 | 0 | 10 | 0 | 15 | 0 |
| Tromsø 2 | 2021 | 3. divisjon | 1 | 0 | — | | 1 | 0 |
| Tromsø 2 | 2022 | 3. divisjon | 7 | 0 | — | | 7 | 0 |
| Tromsø 2 | 2023 | 3. divisjon | 4 | 0 | — | | 4 | 0 |
| Tromsø 2 | 2024 | 4. divisjon | 3 | 0 | — | | 3 | 0 |
| Tromsø 2 | 2025 | 3. divisjon | 13 | 0 | — | | 13 | 0 |
| Tromsø 2 | Total | | 28 | 0 | — | | 28 | 0 |
| Tromsdalen | 2026 | 2. divisjon | 23 | 0 | 1 | 0 | 24 | 0 |
| Career Total | | | 152 | 0 | 24 | 0 | 176 | 0 |
