= Tobias Guddal =

Norwegian footballer

Personal information
- Full name: Tobias Kvalvågnes Guddal
- Date of birth: 25 July 2002 (age 24)
- Place of birth: Norway
- Height: 2.01 m (6 ft 7 in)
- Position: Centre-back

Team information
- Current team: Sparta Prague
- Number: 6

Youth career
- –2017: Sveio
- 2018–2020: Djerv 1919

Senior career*
Years	Team	Apps	(Gls)
2019–2021	Djerv 1919	9	(1)
2021–2024	Bryne	33	(1)
2022	→Notodden (loan)	10	(0)
2023	→Levanger (loan)	8	(0)
2024–2026	Tromsø	70	(1)
2026–	Sparta Prague	6	(1)

International career^{‡}
2024	Norway U21	4	(0)
- * Club domestic league appearances and goals as of 15 September 2026 ‡ National team caps and goals as of 19 November 2024

Tobias Kvalvågnes Guddal (born 25 July 2002) is a Norwegian professional footballer who plays as a centre-back for Czech First League club Sparta Prague.

== Career ==
=== Bryne ===
Guddal joined Bryne in April 2021, playing a total of sixteen games in the first season for the club.

After few appearances for Bryne at the start of the 2022 season, Guddal spend the latter half of the season on loan, playing for Notodden in the Norwegian Second Division.

The following season Guddal was again loaned out, this time to Levanger. Originally a season long loan, Bryne recalled Guddal in the summer, after several injuries in their squad. Guddal's only goal for Bryne came after his return from Levanger, in a game against Sandnes Ulf. In September 2023, Guddal was named young player of the month in the Norwegian First Division for the month of August. At the same time Guddal extended his contract through the summer of 2026.

=== Tromsø ===
In March 2024, Eliteserien club Tromsø announced they had signed Guddal on a four-and-a-half-year contract. Guddal's debut for the club came against Brann, after being subbed on in the 88th minute. His first goal for the club came later that season in a 2–1 loss against Lillestrøm.

=== Sparta Prague ===
On 31 July 2026, Guddal signed a contract with Sparta Prague.

== International career ==
On 21 March 2024, Guddal played his first international match for the Norway national under-21 team, against the Netherlands, coming on as a substitute at half time. Norway went on to win the game 2–1.

In September 2025 he was called up to the senior Norway squad for a friendly against Finland.

== Career statistics ==
As of 16 September 2026

Appearances and goals by club, season and competition
Club	Season	League			National cup		Europe		Other		Total	
Club	Season	Division	Apps	Goals	Apps	Goals	Apps	Goals	Apps	Goals	Apps	Goals
Djerv 1919	2019	3. divisjon	9	0	0	0	—		—		9	0
Djerv 1919	2020	3. divisjon	— (Note: The Norwegian Third Division was canceled due to COVID-19 restrictions)									
Djerv 1919	Total		9	0	0	0	—		—		9	0
Bryne	2021	1. divisjon	13	0	3	0	—		—		16	0
Bryne	2022	1. divisjon	6	0	1	0	—		—		7	0
Bryne	2023	1. divisjon	14	1	0	0	—		1 (Note: Appearance in 1. divisjon promotional play-offs)	0	15	1
Bryne	Total		33	1	4	0	—		1	0	38	1
Notodden (loan)	2022	2. divisjon	10	0	0	0	—		—		10	0
Levanger (loan)	2023	2. divisjon	8	0	0	0	—		—		8	0
Tromsø	2024	Eliteserien	26	1	2	0	4 (Note: Appearances in UEFA Conference League)	0	—		32	1
Tromsø	2025	Eliteserien	29	0	2	0	—		—		31	0
Tromsø	2026	Eliteserien	15	0	1	0	2 (Note: Appearances in UEFA Europa League)	0	—		18	0
Tromsø	Total		70	1	5	0	6	0	—		81	1
Sparta Prague	2026–27	Czech First League	6	1	0	0	1 (Note: Appearances in UEFA Europa League)	2	—		7	3
Career total			135	3	9	0	8	2	1	0	152	5

== Honours ==
Individual

- Norwegian First Division Young Player of the Month: August 2023
