= Lasse Nordås =

Norwegian footballer (born 2002)

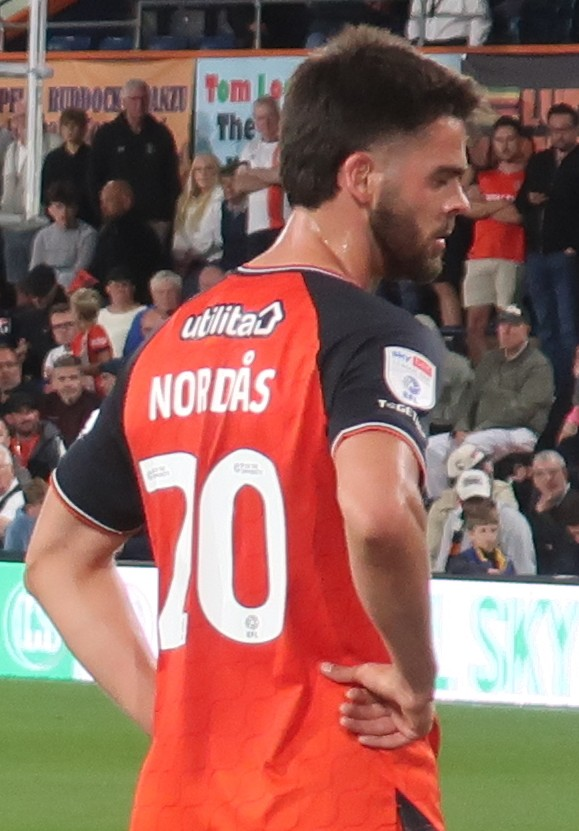
- Nordås in 2025 with Luton Town

Personal information
- Full name: Lasse Selvåg Nordås
- Date of birth: 10 February 2002 (age 24)
- Place of birth: Lillestrøm, Norway
- Height: 1.94 m (6 ft 4 in)
- Position: Forward

Team information
- Current team: Cracovia (on loan from Luton Town)
- Number: 11

Youth career
- –2019: Lillestrøm

Senior career*
| Years | Team | Apps | (Gls) |
| 2020 | Strømmen | 26 | (9) |
| 2021–2023 | Bodø/Glimt | 22 | (2) |
| 2022 | → Tromsø (loan) | 14 | (2) |
| 2023–2025 | Tromsø | 42 | (11) |
| 2025– | Luton Town | 21 | (1) |
| 2026 | → Heerenveen (loan) | 16 | (6) |
| 2026– | → Cracovia (loan) | 9 | (3) |

International career
| 2021 | Norway U19 | 2 | (1) |
| 2021–2023 | Norway U20 | 9 | (4) |
| 2023–2024 | Norway U21 | 12 | (3) |
- * Club domestic league appearances and goals as of 18:38, 22 November 2026 (UTC)

Lasse Selvåg Nordås (born 10 February 2002) is a Norwegian professional footballer who plays as a forward for Ekstraklasa club Cracovia, on loan from EFL League One club Luton Town.

== Career ==
Nordås spent his youth and junior career in Lillestrøm, but did not reach the first team. He did however get the chance at Lillestrøm's fellow second-tier contenders Strømmen, and scored nine goals in 26 games. Ahead of the 2021 season, he signed for Bodø/Glimt, where he scored his first goal in his third outing, all as a substitute. He scored his first hat-trick in the 2021 Norwegian Football Cup first round against Rana. On 5 July 2023 he joined Tromsø on a permanent transfer, signing a four-year contract.

On 3 February 2025, Nordås signed for EFL Championship club Luton Town for an undisclosed fee. On 6 January 2026, he was loaned to Eredivisie side Heerenveen, until the end of the season.

On 4 September 2026, Nordås joined Polish Ekstraklasa side Cracovia on loan until the end of the season, including an option to buy.

== Career statistics ==
As of match played 24 October 2026

Appearances and goals by club, season and competition
| Club | Season | League | | | National cup (Note: Includes Norwegian Football Cup, FA Cup, KNVB Cup) | | League cup (Note: Includes EFL Cup) | | Europe | | Other | | Total | |
| Club | Season | Division | Apps | Goals | Apps | Goals | Apps | Goals | Apps | Goals | Apps | Goals | Apps | Goals |
|---|---|---|---|---|---|---|---|---|---|---|---|---|---|---|
| Strømmen | 2020 | 1. divisjon | 26 | 9 | — | | — | | — | | — | | 26 | 9 |
| Bodø/Glimt | 2021 | Eliteserien | 11 | 2 | 3 | 4 | — | | 6 (Note: Two appearances in UEFA Champions League and four appearances in UEFA Europa Conference League) | 0 | — | | 20 | 6 |
| Bodø/Glimt | 2022 | Eliteserien | 1 | 0 | 0 | 0 | — | | 1 (Note: Appearance(s) in UEFA Europa Conference League) | 0 | — | | 2 | 0 |
| Bodø/Glimt | 2023 | Eliteserien | 10 | 0 | 5 | 0 | — | | 0 | 0 | — | | 15 | 0 |
| Bodø/Glimt | Total | | 22 | 2 | 8 | 4 | — | | 7 | 0 | — | | 37 | 6 |
| Tromsø (loan) | 2022 | Eliteserien | 14 | 2 | 1 | 0 | — | | — | | — | | 15 | 2 |
| Tromsø | 2023 | Eliteserien | 14 | 2 | 0 | 0 | — | | — | | — | | 14 | 2 |
| Tromsø | 2024 | Eliteserien | 28 | 9 | 2 | 3 | — | | 4 | 2 | — | | 34 | 14 |
| Tromsø | Total | | 56 | 13 | 3 | 3 | 0 | 0 | 4 | 2 | 0 | 0 | 63 | 18 |
| Luton Town | 2024–25 | EFL Championship | 10 | 0 | — | | — | | — | | — | | 10 | 0 |
| Luton Town | 2025–26 | EFL League One | 11 | 1 | 1 | 0 | 1 | 0 | — | | 4 (Note: Appearance(s) in EFL Trophy) | 3 | 17 | 4 |
| Luton Town | 2026–27 | EFL League One | 0 | 0 | 0 | 0 | 0 | 0 | — | | 0 | 0 | 0 | 0 |
| Luton Town | Total | | 21 | 1 | 1 | 0 | 1 | 0 | — | | 4 | 3 | 27 | 4 |
| Heerenveen (loan) | 2025–26 | Eredivisie | 16 | 6 | 1 | 0 | — | | — | | 1 (Note: Appearance in Eredivisie European competition play-offs) | 0 | 18 | 6 |
| Cracovia (loan) | 2026–27 | Ekstraklasa | 6 | 2 | — | | — | | — | | — | | 6 | 2 |
| Career total | | | 147 | 35 | 13 | 7 | 1 | 0 | 11 | 2 | 5 | 3 | 178 | 48 |

== Honours ==
Bodø/Glimt

- Eliteserien: 2021
