= Vegard Erlien =

Norwegian footballer (born 1998)

Personal information
- Full name: Vegard Østraat Erlien
- Date of birth: 24 June 1998 (age 28)
- Place of birth: Trondheim, Norway
- Height: 1.83 m (6 ft 0 in)
- Position: Forward

Team information
- Current team: Tromsø
- Number: 15

Youth career
- Byåsen
- –2017: Rosenborg

Senior career*
Years	Team	Apps	(Gls)
2014–2017	Rosenborg 2	61	(15)
2018–2019	Sandnes Ulf	43	(7)
2019–2021	Ranheim 2	5	(4)
2019–2022	Ranheim	84	(18)
2023–2025	Tromsø	81	(32)
2026	Valladolid	11	(0)
2026–	Tromsø	6	(1)

International career^{‡}
2013	Norway U15	2	(0)
2014	Norway U16	7	(0)
- * Club domestic league appearances and goals as of 8 November 2026 ‡ National team caps and goals as of 7 November 2019

Vegard Østraat Erlien (born 26 June 1998) is a Norwegian professional footballer who plays as a forward for Tromsø.

== Career ==
Erlien started his career at Byåsen before moving to Rosenborg, playing for their youth and second team. He was then picked up by Sandnes Ulf in 2018.

After a successful spell at Sandnes Ulf, Erlien returned to Trondheim, this time playing for top-flight club Ranheim. He signed his contract in the summer transfer window of 2019, on a contract that lasted until the end of the 2022 season.

In September 2022 Erlien signed a pre-contract with Tromsø, starting from 1 January 2023, and lasting until the end of the 2025 season. He became the top goalscorer internally at Tromsø in 2023, but missed the mid part of the 2024 season after a leg fracture.

On 28 December 2025, Real Valladolid announced that they had signed Erlien on a two-and-a-half year deal after his contract with Tromsø had expired after the 2025 season. The following 1 September, after 11 goalless matches, he terminated his link with theh club.

== Career statistics ==
As of 8 November 2026

Appearances and goals by club, season and competition
Club	Season	League			National cup		Europe		Other		Total	
Club	Season	Division	Apps	Goals	Apps	Goals	Apps	Goals	Apps	Goals	Apps	Goals
Rosenborg 2	2014	2. divisjon	3	0	—		—		—		3	0
Rosenborg 2	2015	3. divisjon	23	7	—		—		—		23	7
Rosenborg 2	2016	2. divisjon	12	6	—		—		—		12	6
Rosenborg 2	2017	3. divisjon	23	2	—		—		—		23	2
Rosenborg 2	Total		61	15	—		—		—		61	15
Sandnes Ulf	2018	1. divisjon	26	4	3	0	—		—		29	4
Sandnes Ulf	2019	1. divisjon	17	3	2	0	—		—		19	3
Sandnes Ulf	Total		43	7	5	0	—		—		48	7
Ranheim 2	2019	3. divisjon	3	0	—		—		—		3	0
Ranheim 2	2021	3. divisjon	2	4	—		—		—		2	4
Ranheim 2	Total		5	4	—		—		—		5	4
Ranheim	2019	Eliteserien	10	2	2	0	—		—		12	2
Ranheim	2020	1. divisjon	23	1	—		—		2 (Note: Appearances in 1. divisjon promotion play-offs)	0	25	1
Ranheim	2021	1. divisjon	21	1	3	0	—		—		24	1
Ranheim	2022	1. divisjon	30	14	2	2	—		—		32	16
Ranheim	Total		84	18	7	2	—		2	0	93	20
Tromsø	2023	Eliteserien	30	15	5	3	—		—		35	18
Tromsø	2024	Eliteserien	23	8	2	2	1 (Note: Appearance in UEFA Conference League)	0	—		26	10
Tromsø	2025	Eliteserien	28	9	2	0	—		—		30	9
Tromsø	Total		81	32	9	5	1	0	—		91	37
Real Valladolid	2025–26	Segunda División	10	0	0	0	—		0	0	10	0
Real Valladolid	2026–27	Segunda División	1	0	0	0	—		0	0	1	0
Real Valladolid	Total		11	0	0	0	—		0	0	11	0
Tromsø	2026	Eliteserien	6	1	2	1	—		—		8	2
Career total			291	77	23	8	1	0	2	0	317	85
