= Eirik Sørensen =

Norwegian footballer (born 1984)

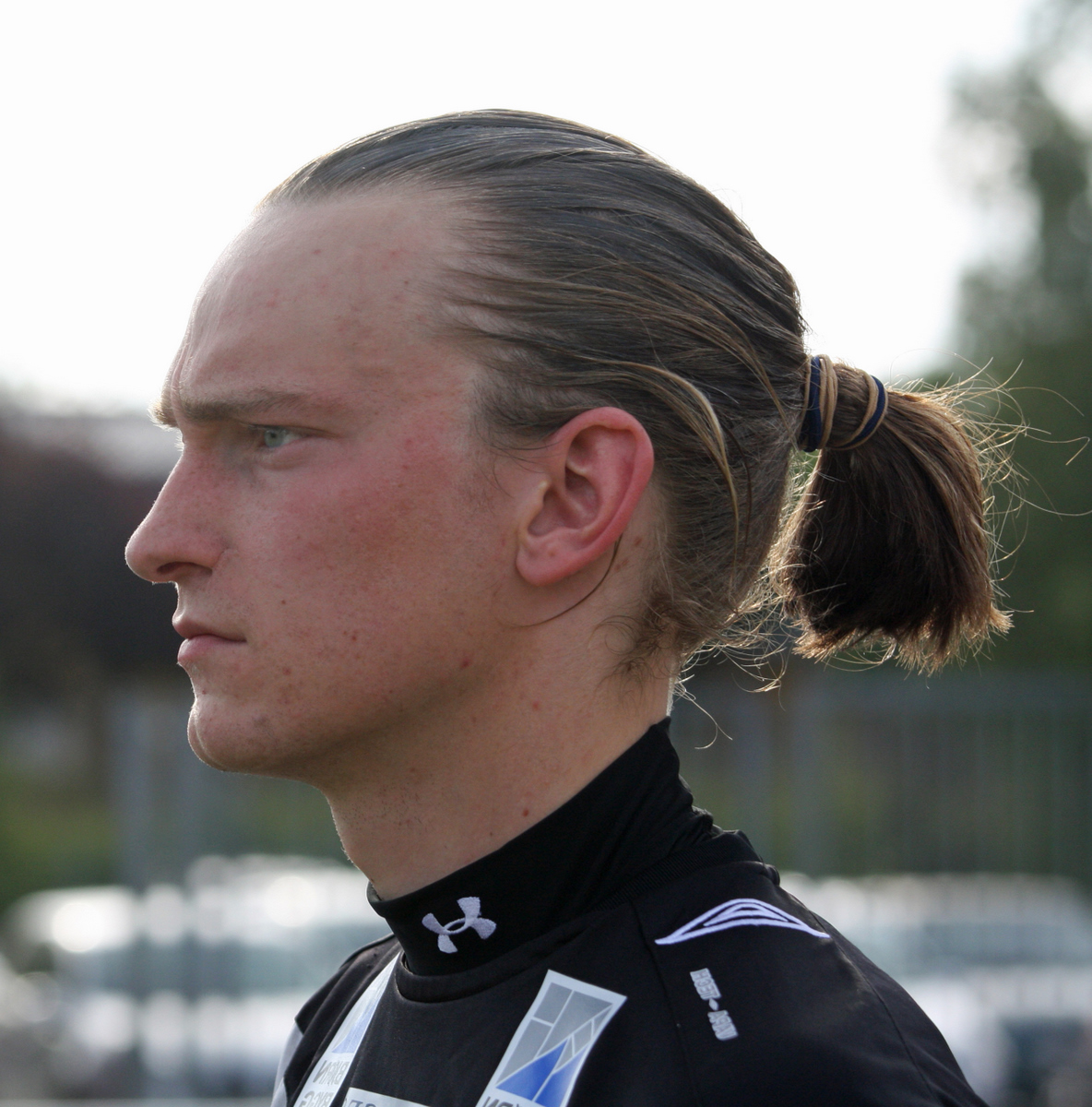

Personal information
- Date of birth: 17 July 1984 (age 42)
- Height: 1.87 m (6 ft 2 in)
- Position: Goalkeeper

Team information
- Current team: Tromsdalen
- Number: 23

Youth career
- Skarp
- Tromsdalen

Senior career*
Years	Team	Apps	(Gls)
2003–	Tromsdalen	148	(0)
2005	→ Tromsø (loan)	1	(0)
- * Club domestic league appearances and goals as of 31 August 2014

Eirik Sørensen (born 17 July 1984) is a Norwegian football goalkeeper who currently plays for Tromsdalen UIL.

He played youth soccer for IF Skarp and Tromsdalen, and made his senior debut for Tromsdalen in 2003. He eventually established himself in the first team. He was loaned out to regional greats Tromsø IL in 2005, and got one game in the Norwegian Premier League.
