= Jørgen Vik =

Norwegian football coach (born 1990)

Personal information
- Date of birth: 26 April 1990 (age 36)
- Place of birth: Tromsø, Norway
- Height: 1.76 m (5 ft 9 1/2 in)
- Position: Goalkeeper

Team information
- Current team: Tromsø (head coach)

Youth career
- 1997–2005: Tromsdalen

Senior career*
Years	Team	Apps	(Gls)
2005	Tromsdalen		
2006–2007	Lyngen/Karnes		
2008–2009	Finnsnes		
2010–2012	Lyngen/Karnes	18	(0)
2013	Finnsnes	22	(0)
2014–2015	Tromsdalen	15	(0)
2016–2017	Lyngen/Karnes	18	(0)
2018	Skjervøy	10	(0)
2018	Lyngen/Karnes	10	(0)
2019	Skjervøy	0	(0)

International career^{‡}
2017–2019	Norway futsal	15	(0)

Managerial career
- 2016–2017: Lyngen/Karnes
- 2018: Lyngen/Karnes
- 2019–2020: Skjervøy
- 2021–2024: Tromsø (assistant)
- 2024–: Tromsø
- * Club domestic league appearances and goals as of 22 March 2019 ‡ National team caps and goals as of 25 September 2019

Jørgen Vik (born 26 April 1990) is a Norwegian football coach and former player who is the head coach of Eliteserien club Tromsø.

== Career ==
Jørgen Vik started his career at Tromsdalen at seven years old and got his senior debut in 2005. After not being able to establish himself in the senior squad, Vik moved on and had two different spells at both Lyngen/Karnes and Finnsnes. Ahead of the 2014 season, Vik returned to play for Tromsdalen, this time playing in the 1. Divisjon, the highest level he would play at through his career. After two seasons at Tromsdalen, he once again returned to Lyngen/Karnes, in a new role as a player-coach. His last season was split between Skjervøy in the spring and returning once again to Lyngen/Karnes in the autumn. After getting signed on as head coach for Skjervøy, he played his final game, a cup tie, against his old club Lyngen/Karnes, winning 7-1.

Simultaneously as Vik was playing football, he also played futsal for Sjarmtrollan, playing regularly in the Norwegian Futsal Premier League from 2015 until his final games in 2020. The team, with Vik as goalkeeper won the league both in 2016/2017, and 2018/2019. His performances got him called up to the Norway national futsal team, where he was capped fifteen times between 2017 and 2019.

== Coaching career ==
=== Lyngen/Karnes ===
Vik's first coaching job was as a player-coach for Lyngen/Karnes ahead of the 2016 season. The club worked with a coaching group consisting of Vik, Øyvind Garfjell, and Cato Larsen. Vik left his position to play for 3. divisjon side Skjervøy after two years at the club.

After his first spell as player-coach for the club, Vik returned in the same position, this time in a team with Ole Talberg, for the latter half of the 2018 season.

=== Skjervøy ===
After Vik's second spell as player-coach for Lyngen/Karnes, he was announced as Skjervøy's new head coach before the 2019 season.

=== Tromsø ===
After two seasons as head coach for Skjervøy, Vik did not sign a new contract with the club and instead started working for Tromsø, this time in a new role as the assistant manager to Gaute Helstrup.

Ahead of Tromsø’s 2024 season, Vik was promoted to head coach, after Helstrup left the club. At the time of his appointment, it was reported that Vik didn’t have the right pro license to coach a club in the Eliteserien, and that he would need someone else in his coaching team to fulfil this. Only weeks after his appointment, Tromsø announced Gard Holme as the new co-head coach, to fulfil the licensing paperwork, making Vik and Holme equal on paper. The season started abysmally for the coaching duo, with five straight losses in the league, while also exiting the Norwegian Cup against Vålerenga. Through the summer, the club picked up more points, and at the end of the season, barely avoided relegation.

Before the start of the next season, Tromsø announced that they had parted way with co-head coach Holme, and that Vik would remain as the sole head coach for the upcoming season. This was possible as Vik was announced as one of several Norwegian coaches picked for the UEFA Pro Licence course starting in 2025.

== Career statistics ==
As of match played 22 March 2019

Appearances and goals by club, season and competition
Club	Season	League			National Cup		Total	
Club	Season	Division	Apps	Goals	Apps	Goals	Apps	Goals
Lyngen/Karnes	2011	3. divisjon	1	0	0	0	1	0
Lyngen/Karnes	2012	3. divisjon	17	0	2	0	19	0
Lyngen/Karnes	Total		18	0	2	0	20	0
Finnsnes	2013	3. divisjon	22	0	1	0	23	0
Tromsdalen	2014	1. divisjon	6	0	2	0	8	0
Tromsdalen	2015	2. divisjon	9	0	2	0	11	0
Tromsdalen	Total		15	0	4	0	19	0
Lyngen/Karnes	2016	4. divisjon	15	0	1	0	16	0
Lyngen/Karnes	2017	4. divisjon	3	0	2	0	5	0
Lyngen/Karnes	Total		18	0	3	0	21	0
Skjervøy	2018	3. divisjon	10	0	0	0	10	0
Lyngen/Karnes	2018	4. divisjon	10	0	0	0	10	0
Skjervøy	2019	3. divisjon	0	0	1	0	1	0
Career total			93	0	11	0	104	0

== Coaching statistics ==
As of match played 21 November 2026

Team	From	To	Record					Ref.
Team	From	To	P	W	D	L	Win %	Ref.
Skjervøy	1 January 2019	6 January 2021	27	12	3	12	44.44	
Tromsø (with Gard Holme)	8 January 2024	8 January 2025	37	13	7	17	35.14	
Tromsø	8 January 2025	present	71	38	11	22	53.52	
Total			135	63	21	51	46.67	—

== Honours ==
Individual

- Eliteserien Coach of the Month: June/July 2025, March/April 2026
