= Luís Pimenta (football manager) =

Portuguese football manager

Personal information
- Full name: Luís Berkemeier Pimenta
- Date of birth: 25 September 1981 (age 45)
- Place of birth: Lisbon, Portugal

Managerial career
- Years: Team
- 2011–2013: Hønefoss (youth coach)
- 2014: Hønefoss (assistant)
- 2014–2016: Kongsvinger
- 2018: Brommapojkarna
- 2019: Riga
- 2020–2023: Norway U18+U19
- 2025–2026: Sogndal

Luís Berkemeier Pimenta (born 25 September 1981) is a Portuguese football manager.

== Personal life ==
Pimenta was born in Lisbon, Portugal to a Portuguese father and a German mother. At the age of 5, he moved to Luxembourg with his family.

== Managerial career ==
At 15, Pimenta decided that he wanted to pursue a career as a football manager, and completed all his UEFA training courses. From Luxembourg he returned to the Portuguese capital to study human kinetics at the university. During his degree course, he went to Liverpool to learn psychology and football science, as well as deepen his knowledge of English. Back in Portugal, he met Gonçalo Pereira, destined to be his deputy for the years to come. After finishing the course, Pimenta and Pereira entered the technical staff of Rui Jorge at Belenenses. At the same time, Pimenta worked at the Academia Carlos Queiroz in Carnaxide.

In October 2011, Pimenta was invited to manage the youth academy of the Norwegian club of Hønefoss, being also an assistant for the first team, where they reached the best classification in the club's history in 2012, under the lead of Leif Gunnar Smerud. He became the assistant manager of Roar Johansen in 2014, but they were both released that year.

In September 2014, he became the manager of Kongsvinger replacing André Bergdølmo, where Pimenta got his first experience as head coach. He helped the team getting up from the 3. divisjon to the 2. divisjon 20 points ahead of their closest rivals. The next year, Kongsvinger finished in fifth and qualified for the promotion playoffs and, more surprisingly, made the 2016 Norwegian Football Cup final, losing to Rosenborg BK. At the end of the season, he declined renewal offers and left the club.

After a year off, Pimenta became the head coach of the Swedish club IF Brommapojkarna in the 2018 Allsvenskan, after two seasons of successive promotions by Olof Mellberg. Again, he brought Gonçalo Pereira along as his deputy. In August 2018, some players came forward, although under anonymity, to reveal an alleged leadership influenced by racism, penalism and sexism. Despite an internal investigation concluding that the accusations were false, as stated since the beginning by Pimenta, him and his two assistants reached an agreement with the club for the termination of the contract. Two days after Pimenta’s departure, Brommapojkarna's sport’s director, Daniel Majstorovic, resigned, disagreeing with the way the club handled this situation, and emphasizing that the accusations were false. Pimenta signed with the Latvian club Riga in February 2019, but left a month later on 2 March.

In the summer of 2020 he was appointed as coach of Norway U18 and U19. In March 2023, Pimenta led Norway U19 to qualify for the 2023 UEFA European Under-19 Championship, where they reached the semi-final.

September 7 Songdal Fotball announced Pimeta had been fired due to his behavior as a leader. Claims include racism towards 3 African players, excluding the three players from training and match squad, temper tantrums towards hotel staff, disregarding medical advice. Pimeta has denied the aligations.
