= 2025 Bryne FK season =

Bryne
2025 season
- Chairman: Nils Steinsland
- Head coach: Kevin Knappen
- Stadium: Bryne Stadion
- Eliteserien: 14th (relegated via play-offs)
- Relegation play-offs: Runners-up
- 2025 Norwegian Football Cup: Fourth round
- 2025–26 Norwegian Football Cup: Fourth round
- Top goalscorer: Duarte Moreira (7)
- Highest home attendance: 5,151 vs Bodø/Glimt
- Average home league attendance: 3,047
Home colours

The 2025 season was the 99th season in the history of Bryne FK and marks their return to the top flight of Norwegian football following promotion in 2024. The club competed in the Eliteserien and the Norwegian Football Cup.

Following a good start in the league, the club dipped into 14th place in August. After the penultimate round had been played, it was certain that Bryne would finish 14th, and thus enter the playoff against a team from the First Division. The opponent being Aalesunds FK, Aalesund shocked by winning the first leg, played in Bryne, 4–0. It therefore did not help that Bryne won the second leg 1–0, and the team was relegated following a single season in Eliteserien.

The latter half of the eseason was marked by turmoil. In September 2025, three players abruptly had their contracts terminated: Axel Kryger, Jens Husebø and Robert Undheim. The latter is described as a "Bryne legend", having played for the team since 2014. The reason for the termination was an open disagreement with manager Kevin Knappen. In the media, it surfaced that more than ten players voiced explicit discontent with Knappen; however, the board of directors chose to continue with Knappen. Anonymous players alleged "fear-based leadership" and "mental violence". Erling Braut Haaland published on Snapchat that "its chaos in my hometown club and it pisses me off so now i cant sleep". After Bryne was relegated, Kevin Knappen was sacked ayway. Released player Axel Kryger claimed that the team did not survive the blow of losing three key players. On 16 December 2025, the club announced the departure of head coach Kevin Knappen following a tenure of nearly four years.

In the last league round, Lithuanian reserve goalkeeper Igor Spiridonov was substituted in, making his debut on the highest level at the age of 37 and 3 months.

== Friendlies ==
=== Pre-season ===
8 February 2025 Friendly	Bryne (Norway)	0–3	(Norway) Sandnes Ulf
13:00 UTC+1

9 February 2025 Friendly	Åsane (Norway)	0–0	(Norway) Bryne
15:00 UTC+1

14 February 2025 Friendly	HamKam (Norway)	2–2	(Norway) Bryne
12:25 UTC+1

26 February 2025 Friendly	Mjøndalen (Norway)	1–4	(Norway) Bryne
13:00

2 March 2025 Friendly	Sarpsborg 08 (Norway)	0–0	(Norway) Bryne
15:00 UTC+1

7 March 2025 Friendly	Haugesund (Norway)	3–0	(Norway) Bryne	Veavågen
17:00	24' (o.g.); Petcho Camara 85'; Kukleci 90'			Stadium: Sparebanken Vest Arena; Attendance: 350

15 March 2025 Friendly	Bryne (Norway)	1–0	(Norway) Jerv
14:00

23 March 2025 Friendly	Bryne (Norway)	1–1	(Norway) Egersund
14:00

== Competitions ==
=== Overview ===
Competition	First match	Last match	Starting round	Final position	Record							
Competition	First match	Last match	Starting round	Final position	Pld	W	D	L	GF	GA	GD	Win %
Eliteserien	30 March 2025	30 November 2025	Matchday 1		7	2	0	5	8	13	−5	28.57
Norwegian Football Cup	13 April 2025	20 May 2025	First round	Fourth round	4	3	0	1	8	4	+4	75.00
Total					11	5	0	6	16	17	−1	45.45

Last updated: 20 May 2025
Source: Competitions

=== Eliteserien ===
==== League table ====
Pos	Team	Pld	W	D	L	GF	GA	GD	Pts	Qualification or relegation
12	KFUM Oslo	30	8	11	11	42	41	+1	35	
13	Kristiansund	30	9	7	14	34	59	−25	34	
14	Bryne (R)	30	8	7	15	37	56	−19	31	Qualification for the relegation play-offs
15	Strømsgodset (R)	30	6	2	22	37	72	−35	20	Relegation to First Division
16	Haugesund (R)	30	2	3	25	22	80	−58	9	Relegation to First Division

Source: Football Association of Norway (in Norwegian)
Rules for classification: 1) Points; 2) Goal difference; 3) Goals scored; 4) Head-to-head points; 5) Head-to-head goal difference; 6) Head-to-head goals scored.
(R) Relegated

==== Results summary ====
Overall								Home						Away					
Pld	W	D	L	GF	GA	GD	Pts	W	D	L	GF	GA	GD	W	D	L	GF	GA	GD
7	2	0	5	8	13	−5	6	1	0	2	3	5	−2	1	0	3	5	8	−3

Last updated: 11 May 2025.
Source: NFF

==== Results by round ====
Round	1	2	3	4
Ground	H	A	H	A
Result	L	L	W	L
Position	11	14		

Updated to match(es) played on 27 April 2025. Source: NFF
A = Away; H = Home; W = Win; D = Draw; L = Loss

==== Matches ====
The match schedule was announced on 20 December 2024.

30 March 2025 1	Bryne	0–1	Bodø/Glimt	Bryne
19:15 UTC+2	Kryger (yellow card) 73'	Report	Høgh 35'; Hauge (penalty missed) 53'	Stadium: Bryne Stadion; Attendance: 5,151; Referee: Mohammad Usman Aslam

6 April 2025 2	Kristiansund	2–1	Bryne	Kristiansund
17:00 UTC+2	Corlu 43'; Tufekcic 87' (pen.) (yellow card) 90+1'	Report	Moreira 11'; Sødal (yellow card) 29'; Strunck (yellow card) 37'	Stadium: Nordmøre Stadion; Attendance: 2,917; Referee: Mathias Støfringshaug

21 April 2025 3	Bryne	3–1	Haugesund	Bryne
17:00 UTC+2	Kryger 4'; Moreira 8'; Görlich (yellow card) 25'; Strunck (yellow card) 28' (goal) 90'	Report	Farstad (yellow card) 53'; Eskesen (yellow card) 64' (goal) 71'	Stadium: Bryne Stadion; Attendance: 3,643; Referee: Ola Hobber Nilsen

27 April 2025 4	Brann	3–2	Bryne	Bergen
17:00 UTC+2	Kornvig (yellow card) 29'; Helland (yellow card) 31'; Finne 64'; Horn Myhre 76'; Castro 90+3' (pen.)	Report	Moreira 8'; Scriven 15' (yellow card) 73'; Saunes (yellow card) 57'; Strunck (yellow card) 80'; Tveita (yellow card) 85'	Stadium: Brann Stadion; Attendance: 15,707; Referee: Svein Tore Sinnes

4 May 2025 5	Rosenborg	3–0	Bryne	Trondheim
19:15 UTC+2	Broholm 9', 63'; Pereira (yellow card) 66'; Yttergård Jenssen 77'; Holm (yellow card) 88'	Report		Stadium: Lerkendal Stadion; Attendance: 11,166; Referee: Sivert Øksnes Amland

11 May 2025 6	Bryne	0–3	Molde	Bryne
17:00 UTC+2	Kryger (yellow card) 59'; Larsen (yellow card) 61'	Report	Breivik 18', 39' (yellow card) 71'; Eriksen 37'	Stadium: Bryne Stadion; Attendance: 2,893; Referee: Kristoffer Hagenes

16 May 2025 7	Strømsgodset	0–2	Bryne	Drammen
18:00 UTC+2		Report	Bojadzic 6'; de Boer (yellow card) 43'; Tómasson 69' (o.g.); Görlich (yellow card) 81'	Stadium: Marienlyst Stadion; Attendance: 5,116; Referee: Espen Eskås

24 May 2025 8	Bryne	4–3	Fredrikstad	Bryne
16:00 UTC+2	Moreira 1'; Skaret 13' (o.g.); Sødal (yellow card) 24'; Bojadzic 73'; Strunck 74'	Report	Metcalfe 26'; Sørløkk 33'; Faraas 88'	Stadium: Bryne Stadion; Attendance: 2,329; Referee: Marius Lien

1 June 2025 9	Bryne	3–2	Sandefjord	Bryne
17:00 UTC+2	Görlich (yellow card) 23'; Scriven 24' (yellow card) 90+6'; Bojadzic 45+1'; Saunes 72'	Report	Cheng 68', 90+2'	Stadium: Bryne Stadion; Attendance: 2,440; Referee: Eivind Bodding

22 June 2025 10	Sarpsborg 08	1–1	Bryne	Sarpsborg
17:00 UTC+2	D. Karlsbakk 30'; Vestergård (yellow card) 90+2'	Report	Moreira 20'	Stadium: Sarpsborg Stadion; Attendance: 4,483; Referee: Stian Røvig Sletner

29 June 2025 11	Bryne	1–1	HamKam	Bryne
17:00 UTC+2	Bojadzic 46'; Sødal (yellow card) 60'; Kryger (yellow card) 70'; Qvigstad (yellow card) 82'	Report	Lien 21'; Roaldsøy (yellow card) 65'; *Mares (yellow card) 66'	Stadium: Bryne Stadion; Attendance: 2,398; Referee: Ola Hobber Nilsen

6 July 2025 12	KFUM Oslo	1–1	Bryne	Oslo
14:30 UTC+2	Njie (yellow card) 64'; Steffensen 79' (o.g.); Gyedu (yellow card) 84'	Report	Kryger 53'; de Boer (red card) 64'	Stadium: KFUM Arena; Attendance: 1,423; Referee: Eivind Bodding

13 July 2025 13	Bryne	1–0	Vålerenga	Bryne
14:30 UTC+2	Bojadzic (yellow card) 72'; Scriven 76' (yellow card) 90'	Report	Sjåtil (yellow card) 33'	Stadium: Bryne Stadion; Attendance: 2,598; Referee: Mohammad Usman Aslam

20 July 2025 14	Tromsø	3–1	Bryne	Tromsø
17:00 UTC+2	Skjærvik (yellow card) 26'; Erlien 45+1' (pen.), 55'; Hjertø-Dahl 58'	Report	Sødal (yellow card) 45'; Husebø (yellow card) 46'; Moreira 52'	Stadium: Romssa Arena; Attendance: 5,546; Referee: Christian Moen

27 July 2025 15	Bryne	1–3	Viking	Bryne
14:30 UTC+2	Husebø (yellow card) 13'; Kryger (yellow card) 14'; Qvigstad 86'; Moreira (yellow card) 90+4'	Report	Christiansen 3', 64'; Bærtelsen 50'; Hansen (yellow card) 73'; Kvia-Egeskog (yellow card) 87'; Roseth (yellow card) 90+4'	Stadium: Bryne Stadion; Attendance: 5,500; Referee: Espen Eskås

3 August 2025 16	Molde	2–0	Bryne	Molde
17:00 UTC+2	Granaas (yellow card) 23'; Gulbrandsen 60'; Sery 74'; Abdullai (yellow card) 89'	Report		Stadium: Aker Stadion; Attendance: 5,775; Referee: Mathias Støfringshaug

10 August 2025 17	Bryne	0–0	KFUM Oslo	Bryne
17:00 UTC+2	Steffensen (yellow card) 35'	Report	Sandal (yellow card) 27'; Aleesami (yellow card) 76'	Stadium: Bryne Stadion; Attendance: 2,866; Referee: Marius Waskaas Lien

17 August 2025 18	HamKam	1–0	Bryne	Hamar
17:00 UTC+2	Ekeroth (yellow card) 7'; Mares 61' (pen.); Mawa (yellow card) 90+2'	Report	Taksdal (yellow card) 63'; Strunck (yellow card) 75'; Sødal (yellow card) 84'; Bojadzic (yellow card) 90+3'	Stadium: Briskeby Stadion; Attendance: 3,349; Referee: Marius Hansen Grøtta

24 August 2025 19	Bryne	2–2	Strømsgodset	Bryne
17:00 UTC+2	Haahr (yellow card) 38'; Scriven (yellow card) 66'; Qvigstad 67'; Larsen 72'	Report	Stengel 21'; Ardraa (yellow card) 39'; Conteh 53'	Stadium: Bryne Stadion; Attendance: 2,666; Referee: Stian Røvig Sletner

30 August 2025 20	Vålerenga	3–2	Bryne	Oslo
18:00 UTC+2	Bjørdal 3'; Sørensen 8' (pen.); Thorvaldsen 29'; Vinícius (yellow card) 45+1'; Ambina (yellow card) 50'	Report	Thornes 45+7'; Åsen Larsen (penalty missed) 52' 52'; Håland (yellow card) 57'; Sødal (yellow card) 79'	Stadium: Intility Arena; Attendance: 0 Referee: Christian Moen

14 September 2025 21	Bryne	0–2	Tromsø	Bryne
14:30 UTC+2	Gregersen (yellow card) 35'	Report	Olden Larsen 9'; Braut 82'	Stadium: Bryne Stadion; Attendance: 3,224; Referee: Mathias Støfringshaug

20 September 2025 22	Fredrikstad	1–1	Bryne	Fredrikstad
14:00 UTC+2	Nuñez 25' (pen.)	Report	Steffensen (yellow card) 14'; Wik (yellow card) 41'; Skovgaard (yellow card) 58'; Bojadzic 88'	Stadium: Fredrikstad Stadion; Attendance: 7,074; Referee: Marius Waskaas Lien

28 September 2025 23	Bryne	2–0	Kristiansund	Bryne
17:00 UTC+2	Skovgaard (yellow card) 48'; Larsen (yellow card) 74'; Bojadzic 79' (yellow card) 85'; Grødem 86'; Scriven (yellow card) 90+5'; Strunck (yellow card) 90+7'	Report	Kryger (yellow card) 78'	Stadium: Bryne Stadion; Attendance: 2,003; Referee: Kristoffer Hagenes

4 October 2025 24	Sandefjord	1–0	Bryne	Sandefjord
16:00 UTC+2	Dunsby 79'	Report	Bojadzic (yellow card) 47'	Stadium: Jotun Arena; Attendance: 2,907; Referee: Marius Hansen Grøtta

18 October 2025 25	Bryne	2–2	Rosenborg	Bryne
16:00 UTC+2	Grødem (yellow card) 4'; Nemčík 62' (o.g.); Moreira 90+2'	Report	Väänänen (yellow card) 29': Ďuriš 30', 86'; M Ceïde (yellow card) 74'; Selnæs (yellow card) 75'	Stadium: Bryne Stadion; Attendance: 2,360; Referee: Ola Hobber Nilsen

25 October 2025 26	Viking	5–1	Bryne	Stavanger
16:00 UTC+2	Roseth 21'; Falchener 46'; Austbø (yellow card) 50'; Christiansen 54', 62'; D'Agostino 89'	Report	Grødem (yellow card) 6' (goal) 67'	Stadium: Lyse Arena; Attendance: 15,900; Referee: Sivert Øksnes Amland

2 November 2025 27	Bryne	2–1	Brann	Bryne
17:00 UTC+1	Grødem 1'; Haahr 18'; Sødal (yellow card) 36'; Larsen (yellow card) 77'	Report	Kornvig 59' (pen.); Sørensen (yellow card) 79' (yellow-red card) 87'	Stadium: Bryne Stadion; Attendance: 3,304; Referee: Mohammad Usman Aslam

9 November 2025 28	Bodø/Glimt	5–0	Bryne	Bodø
17:00 UTC+1	Bjørkan 16'; Berg 68'; Helmersen 70'; Fet 84'; Jørgensen 87'	Report	Scriven (yellow card) 18'	Stadium: Aspmyra Stadion; Attendance: 6,036; Referee: Stian Røvig Sletner

23 November 2025 29	Bryne	0–3	Sarpsborg 08	Bryne
14:30 UTC+1	Skovgaard (yellow card) 52'; Moreira (yellow card) 75'; Landu Landu (yellow card) 79'	Report	Carstensen 5'; Job 56'; Nibe (yellow card) 62'; D. Karlsbakk 90+6'	Stadium: Bryne Stadion; Attendance: 2,327; Referee: Christian Moen

30 November 2025 30	Haugesund	1–4	Bryne	Haugesund
17:00 UTC+1	Diarra 8'	Report	Larsen 3', 5'; Håland 73'; Østrem 80'	Stadium: Haugesund Sparebank Arena; Attendance: 3,461; Referee: Sivert Øksnes Amland

==== Relegation play-offs ====
7 December 2025 Final First leg	Bryne	0–4	Aalesund	Bryne
17:00 UTC+1	Moreira (yellow card) 39'; Larsen (yellow card) 44'; Scriven (yellow card) 53'	Report	Christensen 12', 26'; Ngongo 38' (pen.); Melland 42'; Skuseth (yellow card) 47'	Stadium: Bryne Stadion; Attendance: 2,739; Referee: Mohammad Usman Aslam

11 December 2025 Final Second leg	Aalesund	0–1 (4–1 agg.)	Bryne	Ålesund
19:00 UTC+1	Myrlid (yellow card) 80'	Report	Moreira 77'	Stadium: Color Line Stadion; Attendance: 8,067; Referee: Tore Hansen

=== Norwegian Football Cup ===
==== 2025 ====
13 April 2025 First round	Varhaug	0–4	Bryne	Varhaug
16:00		Report	Åsen Larsen 7', 18', 48'; Sødal 64'	Stadium: Varhaug Kunstgress 1 Referee: Aleksander Skjold Vermundsen

24 April 2025 Second round	Torvastad	1–2	Bryne	Torvastad
18:00	Skjelde 37'; Braseth (yellow card) 72'; Grønningen (yellow card) 79'	Report	Strunck Jakobsen 18'; Bojadzic 47'; Qvigstad (yellow card) 50'; Larsen (yellow card) 79'	Stadium: Torvastad 1 grasbane Referee: Freek Arjen van Herk

7 May 2025 Third round	Bryne	2–1 (a.e.t.)	Brann	Bryne
18:00	Sødal (yellow card) 33'; Haahr Steffensen 45+2'; Norheim (yellow card) 49'; Scriven (yellow card) 90'; Strunck (yellow card) 100'; Kryger 118' (yellow card) 120'	Report	Finne 84'	Stadium: Bryne Stadion; Attendance: 2,252; Referee: Sigurd Smehus Kringstad

20 May 2025 Fourth round	Bryne	0–2	KFUM	Bryne
18:00	Norheim (yellow card) 64' (yellow-red card) 76'	Report	Okeke 40'; Hickson Gyedu 78'	Stadium: Bryne Stadion; Attendance: 1,422; Referee: Rohit Saggi

==== 2025–26 ====
24 September 2025 Third round	Brattvåg	1–2	Bryne	Brattvåg
18:00 CEST (UTC+2)	Tveiten (yellow card) 54'; Hagen (yellow card) 66'; Solnørdal 75'	Report	Håland 12'; Landu Landu (yellow card) 26'; Strunck (yellow card) 90+1' (goal) 90+4'	Stadium: Brattvåg stadion Attendance: 571; Referee: Mohammad Usman Aslam

The remaining rounds took place during the 2026 season.

== Squad statistics ==
As of match played 24 May 2025

=== Appearances and goals ===
No.	Pos	Nat	Player	Total		Eliteserien		Norwegian Cup	
No.	Pos	Nat	Player	Apps	Goals	Apps	Goals	Apps	Goals
1	GK	(Sweden) SWE	Anton Cajtoft	2	0	0	0	2	0
2	DF	(Germany) GER	Luis Görlich	9	0	5+2	0	2	0
3	DF	(Norway) NOR	Sondre Norheim	9	0	1+4	0	4	0
4	MF	(Norway) NOR	Christian Landu Landu	8	0	0+4	0	2+2	0
5	DF	(Denmark) DEN	Jacob Haahr Steffensen	9	1	6	0	3	1
6	DF	(Norway) NOR	Remi-André Svindland	0	0	0	0	0	0
7	MF	(Norway) NOR	Mats Thornes	4	0	0+2	0	2	0
8	MF	(Norway) NOR	Lars Erik Sødal	9	1	5+1	0	2+1	1
9	FW	(Norway) NOR	Sanel Bojadzic	10	3	4+2	2	3+1	1
10	FW	(Norway) NOR	Robert Undheim	2	0	0	0	0+2	0
11	FW	(Kenya) KEN	Alfred Scriven	12	1	8	1	2+2	0
12	GK	(Netherlands) NED	Jan de Boer	8	0	8	0	0	0
14	DF	(Norway) NOR	Eirik Saunes	8	0	6	0	2	0
15	DF	(Norway) NOR	Jon-Helge Tveita	6	0	1+3	0	2	0
16	DF	(The Gambia) GAM	Dadi Gaye	6	0	0+2	0	4	0
17	DF	(Norway) NOR	Lasse Qvigstad	9	0	6+1	0	0+2	0
18	FW	(Portugal) POR	Duare Moreira	10	4	8	4	1+1	0
19	MF	(Denmark) DEN	Nicklas Strunck	11	3	8	2	3	1
21	MF	(Norway) NOR	David Aksnes	0	0	0	0	0	0
22	MF	(Norway) NOR	Heine Åsen Larsen	9	3	4+2	0	1+2	3
23	MF	(Norway) NOR	Kristian Håland	2	0	0+1	0	1	0
24	DF	(Norway) NOR	Jens Husebø	11	0	8	0	1+2	0
26	DF	(Norway) NOR	Axel Kryger	12	2	8	1	2+2	1
29	MF	(Norway) NOR	Martin Åmot Lye	2	0	0	0	0+2	0
32	FW	(Norway) NOR	Sjur Jonassen	9	0	2+3	0	3+1	0
43	FW	(Norway) NOR	Jaran Eike Østrem	1	0	0	0	0+1	0
99	GK	(Lithuania) LTU	Igor Spiridonov	2	0	0	0	2	0
Players away from Bryne on loan:
Players who appeared for Bryne no longer at the club:

=== Goal scorers ===
Rank	Pos.	No.	Nat.	Player	Eliteserien	Norwegian Cup	Total
1	FW	18	(Portugal)	Duarte Moreira	4	0	4
2	FW	9	(Norway)	Sanel Bojadzic	2	1	3
2	MF	19	(Denmark)	Nicklas Strunck	2	1	3
2	MF	22	(Norway)	Heine Åsen Larsen	0	3	3
5				Own goal	2	0	2
5	DF	26	(Norway)	Axel Kryger	1	1	2
7	FW	11	(Kenya)	Alfred Scriven	1	0	1
7	DF	5	(Denmark)	Jacob Haahr Steffensen	0	1	1
7	MF	8	(Norway)	Lars Erik Sødal	0	1	1
TOTALS					12	8	20

=== Clean sheets ===
Rank	Pos.	No.	Nat.	Player	Eliteserien	Norwegian Cup	Total
1	GK	12	(Netherlands)	Jan de Boer	1	0	1
1	GK	99	(Lithuania)	Igor Spiridonov	0	1	1
TOTALS					1	1	2

=== Disciplinary record ===
No.	Pos.	Nat.	Name	Eliteserien		Norwegian Cup		Total	
No.	Pos.	Nat.	Name	Booked	Sent off (straight red)	Booked	Sent off (straight red)	Booked	Sent off (straight red)
2	DF	(Germany)	Luis Görlich	2	0	0	0	2	0
3	DF	(Norway)	Sondre Norheim	0	0	1	1	1	1
8	MF	(Norway)	Lars Erik Sødal	2	0	1	0	3	0
11	FW	(Kenya)	Alfred Scriven	1	0	1	0	2	0
12	GK	(Netherlands)	Jan de Boer	1	0	0	0	1	0
14	DF	(Norway)	Eirik Saunes	1	0	0	0	1	0
15	DF	(Norway)	Jon-Helge Tveita	1	0	0	0	1	0
17	DF	(Norway)	Lasse Qvigstad	0	0	1	0	1	0
19	MF	(Denmark)	Nicklas Strunck	3	0	1	0	4	0
22	MF	(Norway)	Heine Åsen Larsen	1	0	1	0	2	0
24	DF	(Norway)	Jens Husebø	1	0	0	0	1	0
26	DF	(Norway)	Axel Kryger	2	0	1	0	3	0
Players away from Bryne on loan:
Players who appeared for Bryne no longer at the club:
TOTALS				15	0	7	1	22	1
