= 2026 Lyn Fotball season =

Lyn
2026 season
- Head coach: Magnus Aadland
- Stadium: Bislett Stadium
- 1. divisjon: 13th
- 2026–27 Norwegian Cup: Pre-season
Home colours	Away colours

The 2026 season is the 130th season in the history of Lyn 1896 Fotballklubb and the third consecutive season in the Norwegian First Division. In addition, the club will participate in the 2026–27 Norwegian Football Cup.

== Pre-season and friendlies ==
18 January 2026	Lyn	0–2	Tromsø IL

24 January 2026	Strømmen	2–1	Lyn

6 February 2026	Raufoss	2–1	Lyn	Raufoss
				Stadium: Raufoss Industripark Arena

13 February 2026	Lyn	0–2	IK Start

24 February 2026	Bryne	3–3	Lyn

1 March 2026	HamKam	4–0	Lyn

7 March 2026	Kongsvinger	2–1	Lyn

21 March 2026	Lyn	3–1	Moss

30 March 2026	Odd	2–1	Lyn

== Competitions ==
=== Overall record ===
Competition	First match	Last match	Starting round	Record							
Competition	First match	Last match	Starting round	Pld	W	D	L	GF	GA	GD	Win %
Norwegian First Division	6 April 2026		Matchday 1	11	3	1	7	8	21	−13	27.27
2026–27 Norwegian Football Cup				0	0	0	0	0	0	+0	—
Total				11	3	1	7	8	21	−13	27.27

Source: Competitions

=== Norwegian First Division ===
Pos	Team	Pld	W	D	L	GF	GA	GD	Pts
9	Strømmen	30	11	6	13	52	62	−10	39
10	Hødd	30	11	6	13	49	59	−10	39
11	Lyn	30	10	4	16	46	61	−15	34
12	Sandnes Ulf	30	9	6	15	45	59	−14	33
13	Moss	30	9	5	16	44	63	−19	32

Updated to match(es) played on 8 November 2026. Source: OBOS-ligaen (in Norwegian)
Rules for classification: 1) Points; 2) Goal difference; 3) Goals scored; 4) Head-to-head points; 5) Head-to-head goal difference; 6) Head-to-head goals scored.

==== Results summary ====
Overall								Home						Away					
Pld	W	D	L	GF	GA	GD	Pts	W	D	L	GF	GA	GD	W	D	L	GF	GA	GD
0	0	0	0	0	0	0	0	0	0	0	0	0	0	0	0	0	0	0	0

==== Results by round ====
Round	1	2	3	4	5	6	7	8	9	10
Ground	H	A	H	A	H	A	H	A	H	A
Result	L	W	L	L	L	W	L	D	W	L
Position										

A = Away; H = Home; W = Win; D = Draw; L = Loss

==== Matches ====
The match schedule was issued on 19 December 2025.

6 April 2026 1	Lyn	2–4	Haugesund	Bekkestua (Note: The match was played at Nadderud Stadion instead of Bislett Stadion, the home stadium of Lyn, due to the latter’s non-fulfillment of the required specifications.)
14:30	Diarra 25' (o.g.); Hellum 53'; Kurtovic (yellow card) 56' (yellow-red card) 61'	Report	Diarra 8' 30' 61' (pen.) 87'; Koskela (yellow card) 57'; Nilsen (yellow card) 68'; Leite (yellow card) 69'; Hannola (yellow card) 79'	Stadium: Nadderud Stadion; Attendance: 1,768; Referee: (Norway) Jan Tennøy

11 April 2026 2	Sogndal	0–3	Lyn	Sogndal
14:00	Skaanes (yellow card) 45'	Report	Hellum 14' 22'; Anders Bjørntvedt Olsen 41'; Sell (yellow card) 56'; Fallou Sock (yellow card) 76'	Stadium: Fosshaugane Campus; Attendance: 1,607; Referee: (Norway) Mohammad Hafezi

20 April 2026 3	Lyn	0–2	Sandnes Ulf	Bekkestua
19:00	Sell (yellow card) 45+5'	Report	Haruna (yellow card) 53'; Anestis Tricholidis (yellow card) 54'; Olaf Bárdarson 64'; Tord Flolid (yellow card) 80'; de Lanlay (yellow card) 88'; Sundgot 90+1'; Egell-Johnsen (yellow card) 90+2'	Stadium: Nadderud Stadion; Attendance: 1,253; Referee: (Norway) Per Heiberg

26 April 2026 4	Moss	2–1	Lyn	Moss
17:00	Julian Lægreid (yellow card) 79' (goal) 89'; Aga 86'	Report	Hellum 60'	Stadium: Melløs Stadion; Attendance: 1,534; Referee: (Norway) Magnus Koløy

1 May 2026 5	Lyn	0–4	Stabæk	Oslo
16:00	Didrik Fredriksen (yellow card) 20'; Julius Skaug (yellow card) 54'	Report	Magnus Lankhof Dahlby 10' (pen.); Olderheim 19'; Hanstad 40' (yellow card) 58'; Sanyang 89' (yellow card) 90'	Stadium: Bislett Stadium; Attendance: 1,543; Referee: (Norway) Marius Grøtta

10 May 2026 6	Raufoss	0–1	Lyn	Raufoss
17:00		Report	Hellum 62'; Ådne Midtskogen (yellow card) 85'	Stadium: Nammo Stadion; Attendance: 672; Referee: (Norway) Mathias Støfringshaug

16 May 2026 7	Lyn	0–3	Kongsvinger	Oslo
16:00	Nilsen (yellow card) 45+1'; Alexander Pedersen (yellow card) 72'; Hellum (yellow card) 90+3'	Report	Vetle Lysell 8'; Sande 15'; Rasmus Christiansen 72'	Stadium: Bislett Stadion; Attendance: 3,470; Referee: (Norway) Anders Bodding

20 May 2026 8	Egersund	0–0	Lyn	Egersund
19:00	Sivert Westerlund (yellow card) 59'; Kasper Sætherbø (yellow card) 84'	Report	Ådne Midtskogen (yellow card) 22'	Stadium: XL-BYGG Sørvest Arena; Attendance: 666; Referee: (Norway) Svein Sinnes

25 May 2026 9	Lyn	1–0	Strømmen	Oslo
17:00	Simen Beck 38' (o.g.); Alexander Pedersen (yellow card) 90'	Report		Stadium: Bislett Stadion; Attendance: 1,504; Referee: (Norway) Javi Mertens

30 May 2026 10	Odd	3–0	Lyn	Skien
16:00	Tewelde 13' 76' 83'; Aas (yellow card) 29'; Hinrik Harðarson (yellow card) 58'	Report		Stadium: Skagerak Arena; Attendance: 780; Referee: (Norway) Abdulhadi Al-Fahad

14 June 2026 11	Lyn	0–3	Bryne	Oslo
16:00		Report	Gaye (yellow card) 45+1'; Kristian Håland 56' (yellow card) 70'; Sødal 68'; Patrick Wik (yellow card) 74'; Moreira 84'; Pichkah (yellow card) 85'	Stadium: Bislett Stadion; Attendance: 1,449; Referee: (Norway) Henrikke Nervik

19 June 2026 12	Ranheim	3–2	Lyn	Trondheim
19:00	Johnsen 42' 83' (pen.); Jonas Pereira 52'	Report	Hellum 41' 89'; Magnus Aadland (yellow card) 70'; Isaac Barnett (yellow card) 87'	Stadium: EXTRA Arena; Attendance: 1,005; Referee: (Norway) Martin Berg

27 June 2026 13	Lyn	1–4	Hødd	Oslo
16:00	Johan Solstad-Nøis (yellow card) 2'; Anders Bjørntvedt Olsen 20' (pen.) (yellow card) 76'; Didrik Fredriksen (yellow card) 45+3'	Report	Manaf Rawufu (yellow card) 16'; Cameron Streete 17' 47'; Isak Skotheim (yellow card) 31' (goal) 78'; Villum Dalsgaard 36'	Stadium: Bislett Stadion; Attendance: 1,263; Referee: (Norway) Haakon Bue

2 July 2026 14	Lyn	6–2	Åsane	Oslo
18:00	Julius Skaug 3' 15' 59'; Nilsen 13'; Hellum 27' 45'; Anders Bjørntvedt Olsen (yellow card) 71'	Report	Iversen (yellow card) 28'; Leonardo Rossi 86'; Geelmuyden 90+1'	Stadium: Bislett Stadion; Attendance: 5,500; Referee: (Norway) Mohammad Hafezi

25 July 2026 15	Strømsgodset	1–1	Lyn	Drammen
18:00	Krasniqi (yellow card) 18'; Fredrik Ardraa 63'; Stengel (yellow card) 86'	Report	Hellum 73'; Didrik Fredriksen (yellow card) 82'	Stadium: Marienlyst Stadion; Attendance: 4,628; Referee: (Norway) Steinar Hauge

2 August 2026 16	Lyn	3–2	Sogndal	Oslo
17:00	Hellum 8' (pen.) 37'; Hovland 12' (o.g.); Ole Kallevåg (yellow card) 65'; Anders Bjørntvedt Olsen (yellow card) 71'	Report	Hovland 49'; Seydina Ousmane Gueye 90+4' (o.g.)	Stadium: Bislett Stadion; Attendance: 1,988; Referee: (Norway) Ali al Hatam

8 August 2026 17	Stabæk	4–3	Lyn	Bærum
16:00	Magnus Lankhof Dahlby 16' 83' (pen.); William Nicolai Wendt 54'; Axel Aamodt 69'; Matić (yellow card) 87'	Report	Nilsen 18'; Mathias Johansen 42'; Julius Skaug (yellow card) 56'; Anders Bjørntvedt Olsen 62'; Ådne Midtskogen (yellow card) 84'; Sell (yellow card) 88'	Stadium: Nadderud Stadion; Attendance: 3,500; Referee: (Norway) Johan Grundt

15 August 2026 18	Lyn	5–1	Odd	Oslo
16:00	Mathias Johansen 14'; Hellum 20' 23' (yellow card) 87'; Anders Bjørntvedt Olsen 43'; Julius Skaug 89'	Report	Daniel Söderberg (yellow card) 36'; Aas 74'	Stadium: Bislett Stadion; Attendance: 2,021; Referee: (Norway) Anders Bodding

26 August 2026 19	Åsane	1–2	Lyn	Bergen
16:00	Leonardo Rossi (yellow card) 7'; Tobias Furebotn (yellow card) 48' (goal) 88'; Magnus Haga (yellow card) 83'	Report	Mathias Johansen 13'; Ole Kallevåg 39'; Ådne Midtskogen (yellow card) 66'; Sander Amble Haugen (yellow card) 74'	Stadium: Åsane Arena; Attendance: 637; Referee: (Norway) Ajdin Medić

30 August 2026 20	Kongsvinger	4–4	Lyn	Kongsvinger
17:00	Vetle Lysell 7'; Sande 18'; Job (yellow card) 35'; Frederik Christensen 57'; Daniel Lysgård (yellow card) 60'; Andreas Dybevik 90+6'	Report	Anders Bjørntvedt Olsen 5' 29'; Mathias Johansen 51'; Race (yellow card) 61'; Sander Amble Haugen (yellow card) 70'; Hellum 78' (yellow card) 88'	Stadium: Gjemselund Stadion; Attendance: 1,799; Referee: (Norway) Magnus Koløy

=== Norwegian Football Cup ===
22 August 2026 First round	Grei	0-4	Lyn	Oslo
16:00		Report	Johansen 39'; Daniel Chrisopher Wilkins 41' (o.g.); Artan Memedov 52'; Fallou Sock 82'	Stadium: Greibanen; Attendance: 175; Referee: (Norway) Himmet Boyar
