= 2026 Bryne FK season =

Bryne
2026 season
- Chairman: Nils Steinsland
- Head coach: Ørjan Heiberg
- Stadium: Bryne Stadion
- 1. divisjon: 9th
- 2025–26 Norwegian Cup: Quarter-finals
- 2026–27 Norwegian Cup: Pre-season
Home colours

The 2026 season is the 100th season in the history of Bryne Fotballklubb and the first season for the club in the Norwegian First Division following relegation. In addition, the club will participate in the 2026–27 Norwegian Football Cup.

On 22 December 2025, Bryne appointed Ørjan Heiberg as head coach.

== Transfers ==
=== In ===
| Pos. | Player | Transferred from | Fee | Date | Source |
|---|---|---|---|---|---|
| MF | (Sweden) Paya Pichkah | (Sweden) IF Brommapojkarna | | 1 January 2026 | |

=== Out ===
| Pos. | Player | Transferred to | Fee | Date | Source |
|---|---|---|---|---|---|
| GK | (Sweden) Anton Cajtoft | | End of contract | 31 December 2025 | |
| DF | (Norway) Marius Mattingsdal | (Norway) Lysekloster IL | End of contract | 31 December 2025 | |
| DF | (Denmark) Andreas Skovgaard | (Kosovo) KF Malisheva | End of contract | 31 December 2025 | |
| MF | (Denmark) Rasmus Thellufsen | | End of contract | 31 December 2025 | |
| MF | (Norway) Jon Helge Tveita | Retired | End of contract | 31 December 2025 | |
| MF | (Norway) Christian Landu Landu | | | 2 February 2026 | |
| GK | (Lithuania) Igor Spiridonov | (Norway) Varhaug | Loan | 30 March 2026 | |

== Pre-season and friendlies ==
| 30 January 2026 | Sandefjord | 2–0 | Bryne |

| 6 February 2026 | Åsane | 1–2 | Bryne |

| 13 February 2026 | Tromsø IL | 1–0 | Bryne |

| 24 February 2026 | Bryne | 3–3 | Lyn |

| 28 February 2026 | Bryne | 2–2 | IK Start |

| 28 March 2026 | Egersund | 4–3 | Bryne |

== Competitions ==
=== Overall record ===
| Competition | First match | Last match | Starting round | Final position | Record | | | | | | | |
| Competition | First match | Last match | Starting round | Final position | Pld | W | D | L | GF | GA | GD | Win % |
|---|---|---|---|---|---|---|---|---|---|---|---|---|
| Norwegian First Division | 7 April 2026 | | Matchday 1 | | 12 | 5 | 1 | 6 | 18 | 20 | −2 | 41.67 |
| 2025–26 Norwegian Football Cup | 8 March 2026 | 19 March 2026 | Fourth round | Quarter-finals | 2 | 1 | 0 | 1 | 5 | 4 | +1 | 50.00 |
| 2026–27 Norwegian Football Cup | | | | | 0 | 0 | 0 | 0 | 0 | 0 | +0 | — |
| Total | | | | | 14 | 6 | 1 | 7 | 23 | 24 | −1 | 42.86 |

Source: Competitions

=== Norwegian First Division ===
| Pos | Team | Pld | W | D | L | GF | GA | GD | Pts | Promotion, qualification or relegation |
|---|---|---|---|---|---|---|---|---|---|---|
| 4 | Stabæk | 27 | 16 | 4 | 7 | 64 | 34 | +30 | 52 | Qualification for the promotion play-offs second round |
| 5 | Odd | 27 | 13 | 6 | 8 | 54 | 41 | +13 | 45 | Qualification for the promotion play-offs first round |
| 6 | Bryne | 27 | 12 | 3 | 12 | 37 | 38 | −1 | 39 | Qualification for the promotion play-offs first round |
| 7 | Hødd | 27 | 11 | 5 | 11 | 47 | 53 | −6 | 38 | |
| 8 | Ranheim | 27 | 10 | 5 | 12 | 68 | 67 | +1 | 35 | |

Updated to match(es) played on 18 October 2026. Source: OBOS-ligaen (in Norwegian)
Rules for classification: 1) Points; 2) Goal difference; 3) Goals scored; 4) Head-to-head points; 5) Head-to-head goal difference; 6) Head-to-head goals scored.

==== Results summary ====
| Overall | | | | | | | | Home | | | | | | Away | | | | | |
| Pld | W | D | L | GF | GA | GD | Pts | W | D | L | GF | GA | GD | W | D | L | GF | GA | GD |
|---|---|---|---|---|---|---|---|---|---|---|---|---|---|---|---|---|---|---|---|
| 27 | 12 | 3 | 12 | 37 | 38 | −1 | 39 | 6 | 3 | 4 | 19 | 17 | +2 | 6 | 0 | 8 | 18 | 21 | −3 |

Last updated: 18 October 2026.
Source: soccerway

==== Results by round ====
| Round | 1 | 2 | 3 | 4 | 5 | 6 | 7 | 8 | 9 | 10 | 11 | 12 | 13 | 14 | 15 | 16 | 17 | 18 | 19 | 20 | 21 | 22 | 23 | 24 | 25 | 26 | 27 | 28 | 29 | 30 |
|---|---|---|---|---|---|---|---|---|---|---|---|---|---|---|---|---|---|---|---|---|---|---|---|---|---|---|---|---|---|---|
| Ground | A | H | A | H | H | A | H | A | A | H | A | H | A | H | A | H | A | H | A | H | A | H | A | H | A | H | A | H | A | H |
| Result | L | L | L | L | D | W | W | L | L | W | W | W | L | D | W | L | W | W | W | L | L | W | W | W | L | D | L | | | |
| Position | 15 | 12 | 13 | 15 | 14 | 14 | 12 | 13 | 13 | 11 | 9 | 10 | 11 | 10 | 10 | 10 | 9 | 8 | 7 | 7 | 7 | 7 | 6 | 6 | 6 | 6 | 6 | | | |

Updated to match(es) played on 18 October 2026. Source: worldfootball
A = Away; H = Home; W = Win; D = Draw; L = Loss

==== Matches ====
The match schedule was issued on 19 December 2025.

| 7 April 2026 1 | Kongsvinger | 3–0 | Bryne | Kongsvinger |
| 19:00 CEST | Job 45+2'; Rasmus Christiansen 56'; Andreas Dybevik 58' | Report | Patrick Wik (yellow card) 88' | Stadium: Gjemselund Stadion; Attendance: 1,668; Referee: (Norway) Harald Sletner |

| 12 April 2026 2 | Bryne | 2–3 | Ranheim | Bryne |
| 17:00 CEST | Strunck 66' (pen.) 79' | Report | Johnsen 4' 35'; Thomas Kongerud (yellow card) 41'; Pallas (yellow card) 64'; Oliver Holden 74' | Stadium: Bryne Stadion; Attendance: 500; Referee: (Norway) Jørgen Haugen |

| 19 April 2026 3 | Egersund | 1–0 | Bryne | Egersund |
| 17:00 CEST | Remi-André Svindland 42' (o.g.); Jan Inge Lynum (yellow card) 75' | Report | Pichkah (yellow card) 49'; Jacob Haahr (yellow card) 66'; Strunck (yellow card) 75'; Remi-André Svindland (yellow card) 88' | Stadium: XL-BYGG Sørvest Arena; Attendance: 1,407; Referee: (Norway) Ali al Hatam |

| 25 April 2026 4 | Bryne | 1–2 | Odd | Bryne |
| 20:00 CEST | Remi-André Svindland 1'; Strunck (yellow card) 34'; Patrick Wik (yellow card) 51'; Moreira (yellow card) 69' | Report | Bojadzic 67' (pen.); Jørgensen (yellow card) 78'; Noah Kojo 89' | Stadium: Bryne Stadion; Attendance: 1,401; Referee: (Norway) Johan Grundt |

| 1 May 2026 5 | Bryne | 3–3 | Sogndal | Bryne |
| 16:00 CEST | | | | Stadium: Bryne Stadion |

| 10 May 2026 6 | Moss | 2–3 | Bryne |

| 16 May 2026 7 | Bryne | 4–2 | Strømmen |

| 20 May 2026 8 | Raufoss | 3–0 | Bryne |

| 25 May 2026 9 | Strømsgodset | 1–0 | Bryne |

| 31 May 2026 10 | Bryne | 1–0 | Hødd |

| 14 June 2026 11 | Lyn | 0–3 | Bryne | Oslo |
| 16:00 | | | | Stadium: Bislett Stadion |

| 21 June 2026 12 | Bryne | 1–0 | Åsane | Bryne |
| 16:00 | | | | Stadium: Bryne Stadion |

| 4 July 2026 14 | Bryne | 1–1 | Sandnes Ulf | Bryne |
| 18:00 |

=== Norwegian Football Cup ===
==== 2025–26 ====
| 8 March 2026 Fourth round | Bryne | 4–2 (a.e.t.) | Rosenborg |

| 19 March 2026 Quarter-finals | Bryne | 1–2 | Brann |

==== 2026–27 ====
| 26 August 2026 First round | Rosseland | v | Bryne |
