= 2026 Kristiansund BK season =

Kristiansund
2026 season
- Chairman: Vidar Solli
- Head coach: Amund Skiri
- Stadium: Nordmøre Stadion
- Eliteserien: 14th
- 2026–27 Norwegian Cup: Pre-season
Home colours	Away colours	Third colours

The 2026 season is the 23rd season in the history of Kristiansund Ballklubb and the third consecutive season in the Eliteserien. In addition, Kristiansund will participate in the 2026–27 Norwegian Football Cup.

== Transfers ==
=== In ===
Pos.	Player	Transferred from	Fee	Date	Source
DF	(Iceland) Júlíus Mar Júlíusson	(Iceland) KR Reykjavík		8 January 2026	
DF	(Denmark) Alexander Munksgaard	(Czech Republic) Baník Ostrava		3 February 2026	
FW	(Nigeria) Promise Meliga	(Norway) Vålerenga	Loan	13 March 2026	
DF	(Serbia) Igor Jeličić	(Serbia) Napredak Kruševac	Loan return	30 June 2026	

=== Out ===
Pos.	Player	Transferred to	Fee	Date	Source
DF	(Norway) Axel Kryger	(Norway) Sandnes Ulf		24 December 2025	
FW	(United States) Ian Hoffmann	(Poland) Lech Poznań	Loan return	31 December 2025	
DF	(Serbia) Igor Jeličić	(Serbia) Napredak Kruševac	Loan	8 January 2026	

== Pre-season and friendlies ==
30 January 2026 Friendly	Aalesund (Norway)	1–0	(Norway) Kristiansund

6 February 2026 Friendly	Molde (Norway)	0–0	(Norway) Kristiansund

15 February 2026 Friendly	Kristiansund (Norway)	1–1	(Norway) Egersund

18 February 2026 Friendly	Kristiansund (Norway)	2–1	(Norway) HamKam

25 February 2026 Friendly	Kristiansund (Norway)	0–1	(Norway) Sarpsborg 08

8 March 2026 Friendly	Kristiansund (Norway)	1–1	(Norway) Ranheim

28 March 2026 Friendly	Kristiansund (Norway)	4–0	(Norway) Brattvåg

27 June 2026 Friendly	Kristiansund (Norway)	0–3	(Norway) Aalesund
15:00

3 July 2026 Friendly	Brann (Norway)	1–2	(Norway) Kristiansund	Bergen
15:00	68'		39'; 80'	Stadium: Nymarksbanene

== Competitions ==
=== Overall record ===
Competition	First match	Last match	Starting round	Record							
Competition	First match	Last match	Starting round	Pld	W	D	L	GF	GA	GD	Win %
Eliteserien	15 March 2026		Matchday 1	11	3	2	6	11	18	−7	27.27
2026–27 Norwegian Football Cup				0	0	0	0	0	0	+0	—
Total				11	3	2	6	11	18	−7	27.27

Last updated: 29 May 2026
Source: Competitions

=== Eliteserien ===
Pos	Team	Pld	W	D	L	GF	GA	GD	Pts	Qualification or relegation
12	KFUM	11	3	3	5	12	17	−5	12	
13	Aalesund	11	2	5	4	15	20	−5	11	
14	Kristiansund	11	3	2	6	11	18	−7	11	Qualification for the relegation play-offs
15	Rosenborg	11	2	3	6	9	18	−9	9	Relegation to First Division
16	Start	12	1	4	7	13	28	−15	7	Relegation to First Division

Updated to match(es) played on 30 May 2026. Source: Football Association of Norway (in Norwegian)
Rules for classification: 1) Points; 2) Goal difference; 3) Goals scored; 4) Head-to-head points; 5) Head-to-head goal difference; 6) Head-to-head goals scored.

==== Results summary ====
Overall								Home						Away					
Pld	W	D	L	GF	GA	GD	Pts	W	D	L	GF	GA	GD	W	D	L	GF	GA	GD
11	3	2	6	11	18	−7	11	2	1	2	7	8	−1	1	1	4	4	10	−6

Last updated: 29 May 2026.

==== Results by round ====
Round	1	2	3	4	5	6	7	8	9	10	11
Ground	H	A	H	A	H	A	H	A	A	H	A
Result	W	W	L	L	W	D	D	L	L	L	L
Position											

Updated to match(es) played on 29 May 2026. Source:
A = Away; H = Home; W = Win; D = Draw; L = Loss

==== Matches ====
The match schedule was issued on 19 December 2025.

15 March 2026 1	Kristiansund	3–2	Brann

6 April 2026 3	Kristiansund	0–3	Bodø/Glimt

11 April 2026 4	Tromsø	2–0	Kristiansund

19 April 2026 5	Kristiansund	2–0	Fredrikstad

26 April 2026 6	Aalesund	1–1	Kristiansund

3 May 2026 7	Kristiansund	1–1	HamKam

10 May 2026 8	Sandefjord	2–0	Kristiansund

16 May 2026 9	Molde	1–0	Kristiansund

20 May 2026 2	Lillestrøm	1–2	Kristiansund

24 May 2026 10	Kristiansund	1–2	Viking

29 May 2026 11	Vålerenga	3–1	Kristiansund	Oslo
19:00				Stadium: Intility Arena; Referee: Tore Hansen

=== Norwegian Football Cup ===
22–23 August 2026 First round	Trønder-Lyn	v	Kristiansund
