= Jens Husebø =

Norwegian footballer (born 1999)

Personal information
- Full name: Jens Berland Husebø
- Date of birth: 7 March 1999 (age 27)
- Height: 1.88 m (6 ft 2 in)
- Position: Centre-back

Team information
- Current team: Start
- Number: 28

Youth career
- 2008–2018: Viking

Senior career*
Years	Team	Apps	(Gls)
2016–2018	Viking 2	61	(1)
2019–2020	Hødd	38	(2)
2021–2022	Ull/Kisa	39	(1)
2022	Ull/Kisa 2	1	(0)
2022	Bryne 2	3	(1)
2022–2025	Bryne	72	(1)
2025–2026	Tromsø	7	(0)
2025	Tromsø 2	1	(0)
2026–	Start	4	(0)
- * Club domestic league appearances and goals as of 22 August 2026

Jens Berland Husebø (born 7 March 1999) is a Norwegian footballer who plays as a centre-back for Eliteserien club Start.

== Career ==
=== Viking ===
Husebø started playing football for Viking at the age of nine. By 2016, he had reached their second team, and made his debut in a game against Eiger. By the end of 2018, Husebø had played sixty-one games for Viking 2, while scoring once.

=== Hødd ===
Ahead of the 2019 season, Husebø made the move to Norwegian Second Division side Hødd on a two-year contract.

=== Ull/Kisa ===
After two seasons with Hødd in the Norwegian Second Division, Husebø made the move to Norwegian First Division side Ull/Kisa in February 2021. Husebø arrived to what was supposed to be a trial period with the club, but after the first training, head coach Sindre Tjelmeland told the club there was no need to wait, and to sign Husebø immediately. Two months later, before the start of the season, Norwegian newspaper VG had Husebø as one of the players most likely to breakthrough in the Norwegian First Division. The first season at the club ended in relegation to the Norwegian Second Division.

=== Bryne ===
After one-and-a-half season at Ull/Kisa, Husebø was picked up by Bryne and headed back to the Norwegian First Division. In his first season, Husebø only played two games in the league before playing over twenty league games in both the 2023 and the 2024 seasons, the latter ending with promotion for the club. The 2025 season saw Husebø play in the Eliteserien for the first time, as local media dubbed him one of the most important players of the squad.

In early September 2025, Husebø, along with Axel Kryger and Robert Undheim all had their contracts with Bryne terminated. The players at the club had been dissatisfied with head coach Kevin Knappen and had started a signature campaign to get him sacked. When the club refused to do so, the club and Husebø agreed that the best thing was to terminate his contracts.

=== Tromsø ===
On 4 September 2025, only days after leaving Bryne, Tromsø announced that they had signed Husebø on a two-and-a-half year contract. Husebø's first game came under two weeks later, against the club he had just left, Bryne, where he started the game on the bench, before being subbed on in the second half.

=== Start ===
Under a year after signing for Tromsø, Husebø again changed clubs, this time signing for Start on a three-and-a-half year contract.

== Personal life ==
Husebø's sister Guro is a professional handball player who has played in the EHF Champions League.

== Career statistics ==
As of 22 August 2026

Appearances and goals by club, season and competition
Club	Season	League			National Cup		Total	
Club	Season	Division	Apps	Goals	Apps	Goals	Apps	Goals
Viking 2	2016	Norwegian Third Division	16	0	—		16	0
Viking 2	2017	Norwegian Third Division	21	0	—		21	0
Viking 2	2018	Norwegian Third Division	24	1	—		24	1
Viking 2	Total		61	1	—		61	1
Hødd	2019	Norwegian Second Division	25	2	2	0	27	2
Hødd	2020	Norwegian Second Division	13	0	—		13	0
Hødd	Total		38	2	2	0	40	2
Ull/Kisa	2021	Norwegian First Division	29	1	2	0	31	1
Ull/Kisa	2022	Norwegian Second Division	10	0	1	0	11	0
Ull/Kisa	Total		39	1	3	0	42	1
Ull/Kisa 2	2022	Norwegian Fourth Division	1	0	—		1	0
Bryne 2	2022	Norwegian Fourth Division	3	1	—		3	1
Bryne	2022	Norwegian First Division	2	0	1	0	3	0
Bryne	2023	Norwegian First Division	24	0	1	0	25	0
Bryne	2024	Norwegian First Division	26	1	2	0	28	1
Bryne	2025	Eliteserien	20	0	3	0	23	0
Bryne	Total		72	1	7	0	79	1
Tromsø	2025	Eliteserien	4	0	0	0	4	0
Tromsø	2026	Eliteserien	3	0	0	0	3	0
Tromsø	Total		7	0	0	0	7	0
Tromsø 2	2025	Norwegian Third Division	1	0	—		1	0
Start	2026	Eliteserien	4	0	0	0	4	0
Career total			226	6	12	0	238	6
