= Heine Åsen Larsen =

Norwegian footballer (born 2002)

Personal information
- Date of birth: 9 July 2002 (age 24)
- Height: 1.76 m (5 ft 9 in)
- Position: Midfielder

Team information
- Current team: Tromsø
- Number: 22

Youth career
- –2015: Jarl
- 2016–2021: Viking

Senior career*
Years	Team	Apps	(Gls)
2019–2021	Viking 2	22	(7)
2021–2022	Viking	1	(0)
2022	→ Egersund (loan)	21	(1)
2022	→ Egersund 2 (loan)	1	(1)
2023–2024	Egersund	31	(10)
2023	Egersund 2	6	(3)
2024–	Tromsø	40	(11)
2025	→ Bryne (loan)	20	(4)
- * Club domestic league appearances and goals as of 21 November 2026

Heine Åsen Larsen (born 9 July 2002) is a Norwegian footballer who plays as a midfielder for Tromsø.

== Career ==
He made his Eliteserien debut on 12 December 2021 against Tromsø. In March 2022, he was loaned out to Egersund. The loan was made permanent after the 2022 season.

After winning promotion with Egersund from the 2023 2. divisjon and impressing in the 2024 1. divisjon, Åsen Larsen was purchased by Eliteserien club Tromsø. This happened to strengthen the squad ahead of the 2024–25 UEFA Conference League qualifying.

Ahead of the 2025 season, Larsen was loaned out to Bryne to try and get more experience in the Eliteserien. Åsen Larsen was recalled from the loan at Bryne and played five games throughout the summer for Tromsø. Then on 21 August 2025, Larsen was loaned back to Bryne again for the remainder of the season.

On 15 September 2026, Larsen signed to extend his contract with the club until 2029, while his previous deal was due to expire in 2027.

== Career statistics ==
As of 21 November 2026

Club	Season	League			National cup		Europe		Other		Total	
Club	Season	Division	Apps	Goals	Apps	Goals	Apps	Goals	Apps	Goals	Apps	Goals
Viking 2	2019	3. divisjon	11	1	—		—		—		11	1
Viking 2	2021	3. divisjon	11	6	—		—		—		11	6
Viking 2	Total		22	7	—		—		—		22	7
Viking	2021	Eliteserien	1	0	0	0	—		—		1	0
Egersund (loan)	2022	2. divisjon	21	1	2	2	—		—		23	3
Egersund 2 (loan)	2022	4. divisjon	1	1	—		—		—		1	1
Egersund	2023	2. divisjon	17	6	1	0	—		—		18	6
Egersund	2024	1. divisjon	14	4	3	0	—		—		17	4
Egersund	Total		31	10	4	0	—		—		35	10
Egersund 2	2023	4. divisjon	6	3	—		—		—		6	3
Tromsø	2024	Eliteserien	8	0	0	0	4 (Note: Appearances in UEFA Conference League)	0	—		12	0
Tromsø	2025	Eliteserien	5	0	0	0	—		—		5	0
Tromsø	2026	Eliteserien	27	11	2	1	6 (Note: Two appearances and one goal in UEFA Europa League, four appearances and two goal in UEFA Conference League)	3	—		35	15
Tromsø	Total		40	11	2	1	10	3	—		52	15
Bryne (loan)	2025	Eliteserien	20	4	4	3	—		2 (Note: Appearances in Eliteserien play-offs)	0	26	7
Career total			142	37	12	6	10	3	2	0	166	46
