= Mats Thornes =

Norwegian footballer (born 2002)

Personal information
- Full name: Mats Selmer Thornes
- Date of birth: 25 August 2002 (age 24)
- Height: 1.80 m (5 ft 11 in)
- Position: Midfielder

Team information
- Current team: Bryne
- Number: 7

Youth career
- 2007–2020: Vidar

Senior career*
Years	Team	Apps	(Gls)
2018–2019	Vidar	20	(1)
2021	Øygarden	23	(1)
2022–2024	Åsane	34	(5)
2024–	Bryne	28	(1)
- * Club domestic league appearances and goals as of 1 December 2025

Mats Selmer Thornes (born 25 August 2002) is a Norwegian footballer who plays as a midfielder for Bryne FK.

== Career ==
Despite hailing from Sola Municipality, Thornes started his youth career in Stavanger club FK Vidar at the age of 4. He made his senior debut in the 2018 2. divisjon. He played more often in 2019, but the team was relegated. In 2020 he only played youth football, as the leagues below the Second Division were cancelled. He was picked up by Øygarden FK on the second tier in 2021, moving to Loddefjord in Bergen. After one season there, he went on to Bergen club Åsane.

Thornes lost almost the entirety of 2023 due to injury; for a long time, the nature of the injury was not even known. He eventually underwent surgery in February 2024. Thornes was bought by Bryne FK in the summer of 2024. He helped secure promotion from the 2024 1. divisjon, and made his Eliteserien debut in 2025. Thornes was able to establish himself as a regular in Bryne's team.
