= Dadi Gaye =

Gambian footballer (born 1995)

Personal information
- Full name: Dadi Dodou Gaye
- Date of birth: March 21, 1995 (age 31)
- Place of birth: Oslo, Norway
- Height: 1.83 m (6 ft 0 in)
- Position: Leftback

Team information
- Current team: Bryne
- Number: 16

Senior career*
| Years | Team | Apps | (Gls) |
| 2012–2013 | Holmlia | 25 | (1) |
| 2013–2014 | Vålerenga 2 | 44 | (1) |
| 2015 | Lørenskog | 15 | (0) |
| 2015 | Follo | 4 | (0) |
| 2015–2017 | Lørenskog | 24 | (0) |
| 2017–2023 | KFUM Oslo | 156 | (6) |
| 2023–2025 | Tromsø | 2 | (0) |
| 2024 | → Strømsgodset (loan) | 7 | (0) |
| 2024 | → KFUM Oslo (loan) | 11 | (0) |
| 2025– | Bryne | 44 | (1) |

International career^{‡}
| 2019 | Gambia | 1 | (0) |
- * Club domestic league appearances and goals as of 13 November 2026 ‡ National team caps and goals as of 13 October 2019

Dadi Dodou Gaye (born 21 March 1995) is a professional footballer who plays as a left-back for Eliteserien club Bryne. Born in Norway, he represents the Gambia at international level.

== International career ==
Gaye was born in Norway and is of Gambian descent. He debuted for the Gambia national football team in a friendly 1–0 win over Morocco on 12 June 2019.

== Career statistics ==
=== Club ===
As of 7 July 2026

| Club | Season | League | | | Cup | | Other | | Total | |
| Club | Season | Division | Apps | Goals | Apps | Goals | Apps | Goals | Apps | Goals |
|---|---|---|---|---|---|---|---|---|---|---|
| Holmlia | 2012 | 3. divisjon | 25 | 1 | 3 | 0 | — | | 28 | 1 |
| Vålerenga 2 | 2013 | 2. divisjon | 20 | 0 | 0 | 0 | — | | 20 | 0 |
| Vålerenga 2 | 2014 | 2. divisjon | 24 | 1 | 0 | 0 | — | | 24 | 1 |
| Vålerenga 2 | Total | | 44 | 1 | 0 | 0 | — | | 44 | 1 |
| Lørenskog | 2015 | 2. divisjon | 15 | 0 | 1 | 0 | — | | 16 | 0 |
| Follo | 2015 | 1. divisjon | 4 | 0 | 0 | 0 | — | | 4 | 0 |
| Lørenskog | 2016 | 2. divisjon | 24 | 0 | 1 | 0 | — | | 25 | 0 |
| KFUM Oslo | 2017 | 2. divisjon | 26 | 1 | 3 | 0 | — | | 29 | 1 |
| KFUM Oslo | 2018 | 2. divisjon | 26 | 0 | 3 | 1 | 4 (Note: Appearances in PostNord-ligaen promotion play-offs) | 0 | 33 | 1 |
| KFUM Oslo | 2019 | 1. divisjon | 29 | 0 | 3 | 0 | 2 (Note: Appearances in OBOS-ligaen promotion play-offs) | 0 | 34 | 0 |
| KFUM Oslo | 2020 | 1. divisjon | 7 | 0 | — | | — | | 7 | 0 |
| KFUM Oslo | 2021 | 1. divisjon | 26 | 2 | 5 | 0 | 3 | 0 | 34 | 2 |
| KFUM Oslo | 2022 | 1. divisjon | 21 | 2 | 2 | 0 | 0 | 0 | 23 | 2 |
| KFUM Oslo | 2023 | 1. divisjon | 21 | 1 | 3 | 0 | — | | 24 | 1 |
| KFUM Oslo | Total | | 156 | 6 | 19 | 1 | 9 | 0 | 184 | 7 |
| Tromsø | 2023 | Eliteserien | 2 | 0 | 0 | 0 | — | | 2 | 0 |
| Strømsgodset (loan) | 2024 | Eliteserien | 7 | 0 | 3 | 0 | — | | 10 | 0 |
| KFUM Oslo (loan) | 2024 | Eliteserien | 11 | 0 | 2 | 0 | — | | 13 | 0 |
| Bryne | 2025 | Eliteserien | 14 | 0 | 4 | 0 | 0 | 0 | 18 | 0 |
| Bryne | 2026 | Norwegian First Division | 14 | 1 | 3 | 0 | 0 | 0 | 17 | 1 |
| Bryne | Total | | 28 | 1 | 7 | 0 | 0 | 0 | 35 | 1 |
| Career total | | | 216 | 9 | 36 | 1 | 9 | 0 | 261 | 10 |
