= Axel Kryger =

Norwegian footballer (born 1997)

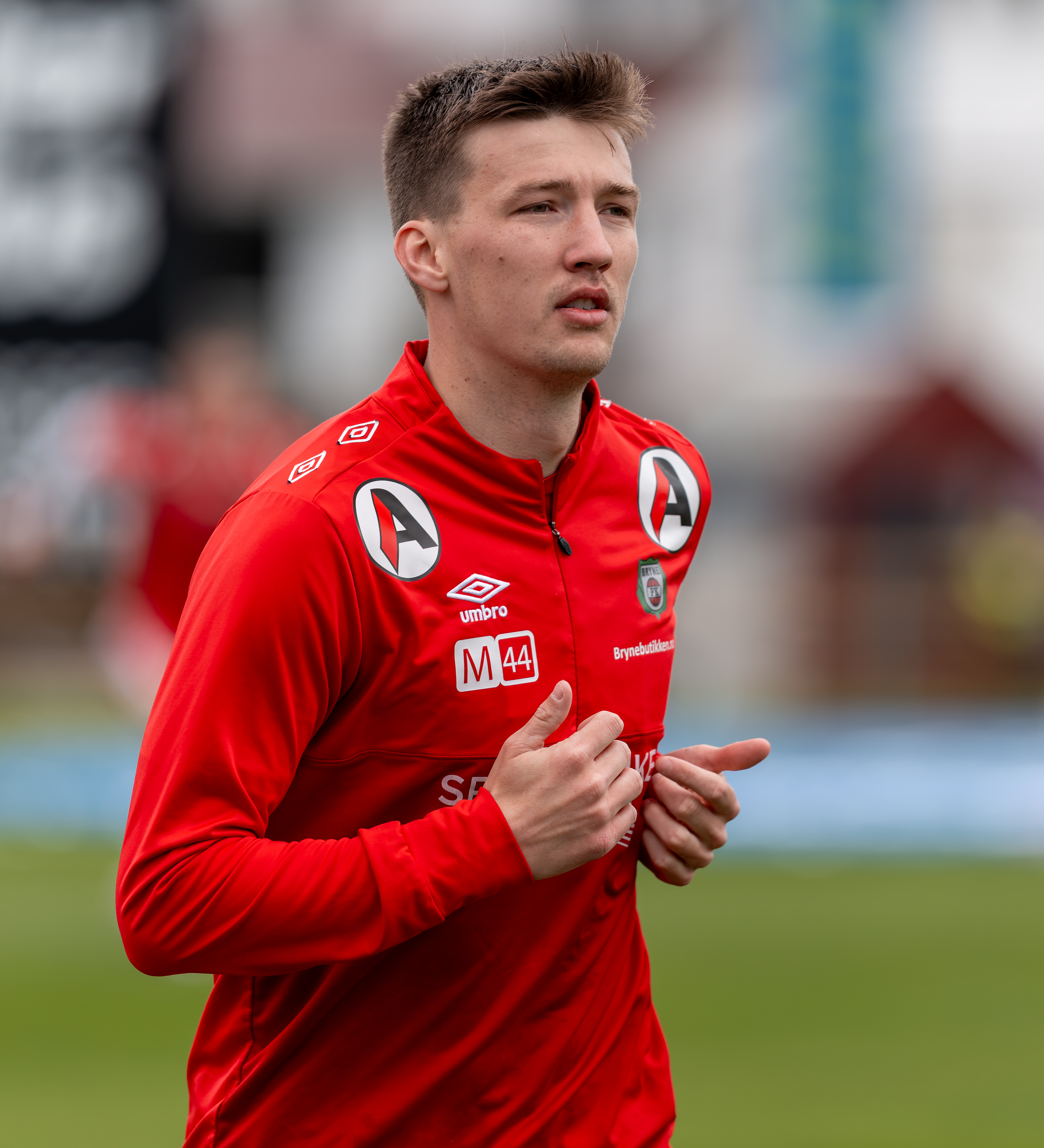
- Picture of Axel Kryger

Personal information
- Date of birth: 21 October 1997 (age 29)
- Place of birth: Sandnes, Norway
- Height: 1.84 m (6 ft 0 in)
- Position: Center-back

Team information
- Current team: Sandnes Ulf
- Number: 4

Youth career
- –2013: Sandnes Ulf

Senior career*
Years	Team	Apps	(Gls)
2014	Lura		
2015–2019	Sandnes Ulf	90	(7)
2020–2022	Sogndal	66	(1)
2022–2025	Bryne	75	(6)
2025	Kristiansund	4	(0)
2026–	Sandnes Ulf	24	(1)

International career
2015	Norway U18	7	(0)
2016	Norway U19	1	(0)
- * Club domestic league appearances and goals as of 14 November 2026

Axel Kryger (born 21 October 1997) is a Norwegian footballer who plays as a central defender for Sandnes Ulf. He also played over 200 games in the Norwegian First Division.

== Career ==
He hails from Trones in central Sandnes. After playing for Sandnes Ulf up to U16 level, he started his senior career in lowly Lura in 2014 before returning to Sandnes Ulf and their senior team in 2015. He was also capped as a Norway youth international. Kryger subsequently played 100 games for Sandnes Ulf in league and cup competitions.

After the 2019 season, Kryger left Sandnes for the first time as he signed for Sogndal. He was described as a workhorse.

In the summer of 2022, Kryger moved back to Rogaland and Bryne. Then-pundit Vegard Hansen stated that Bryne was a "winner" of the transfer window, crediting their 7 points in 3 recent matches with the arrival of Kryger, Jørgen Hatlehol and Jens Husebø. Kryger stated that he had "no feelings for Sandnes Ulf" anymore.

On 2 November 2024, Kryger scored a decisive goal as Bryne beat Egersund 2–1 and won promotion to the Eliteserien, for the first time since 2003. He also renewed his contract, which was about to expire. Kryger would make his Eliteserien debut in 2025 as team captain.

On 21 April, Kryger both recorded his first Eliteserien victory and his first goal, as Haugesund was beat 3–1. Kryger was declared man of the match locally, and as such he received a live lamb. Some regarded it as a fun media jippo; however the Norwegian Society for Protection of Animals claimed it to violate animal welfare laws. Bryne countered that the lamb was only symbolic.

In September 2025, after terminating his contract with Bryne, Kryger signed for Kristiansund. In December 2025, he returned to Sandnes Ulf.

== Personal life ==
Kryger settled in Sandnes. By 2025, he had two children.

== Career statistics ==
As of 14 November 2026

Appearances and goals by club, season and competition
Club	Season	League			National cup		Other		Total	
Club	Season	Division	Apps	Goals	Apps	Goals	Apps	Goals	Apps	Goals
Sandnes Ulf	2015	1. divisjon	7	0	0	0	—		7	0
Sandnes Ulf	2016	1. divisjon	3	0	1	0	—		4	0
Sandnes Ulf	2017	1. divisjon	23	3	2	0	1 (Note: Appearance(s) in Eliteserien play-offs)	0	26	3
Sandnes Ulf	2018	1. divisjon	28	4	3	2	—		31	6
Sandnes Ulf	2019	1. divisjon	29	0	3	0	—		32	0
Sandnes Ulf	Total		90	7	9	2	1	0	100	9
Sogndal	2020	1. divisjon	27	0	—		2	0	29	0
Sogndal	2021	1. divisjon	25	0	3	1	1	0	29	1
Sogndal	2022	1. divisjon	14	1	3	1	—		17	2
Sogndal	Total		66	1	6	2	3	0	75	3
Bryne	2022	1. divisjon	10	1	1	0	—		11	1
Bryne	2023	1. divisjon	28	0	3	0	1	0	32	0
Bryne	2024	1. divisjon	20	3	0	0	—		20	3
Bryne	2025	Eliteserien	17	2	4	1	—		21	3
Bryne	Total		75	6	8	1	1	0	84	6
Kristiansund	2025	Eliteserien	4	0	1	0	—		5	0
Sandnes Ulf	2026	1. divisjon	24	1	2	0	—		26	1
Career total			259	15	26	5	5	0	290	20
