= Muamer Brajanac =

Danish footballer (born 2001)

Personal information
- Date of birth: 15 February 2001 (age 25)
- Place of birth: Kolding, Denmark
- Height: 1.89 m (6 ft 2 in)
- Position: Forward

Team information
- Current team: Esbjerg fB
- Number: 80

Youth career
- –2016: Kolding
- 2016–2018: Brøndby
- 2018–2020: Copenhagen

Senior career*
Years	Team	Apps	(Gls)
2020–2022	Horsens	29	(1)
2021	→ Aalesund (loan)	7	(1)
2022–2024	Hobro	61	(23)
2024	Randers	15	(0)
2024–2025	Vålerenga	31	(12)
2025–	Esbjerg fB	28	(11)

International career
2016–2017	Denmark U16	10	(6)
2017–2018	Denmark U17	12	(4)
2018–2019	Denmark U18	5	(1)
- * Club domestic league appearances and goals as of 2 June 2026

Muamer Brajanac (born 15 February 2001) is a Danish professional footballer who plays as a forward for Danish 1st Division side Esbjerg fB. Born in Denmark, he is of Bosnian descent.

== Club career ==
He made his Danish Superliga debut for AC Horsens on 25 October 2020 in a game against FC Nordsjælland. On 31 August 2021, he was loaned out to Norwegian club Aalesunds FK for the rest of 2021.

On 28 January 2022, Brajanac joined Danish 1st Division club Hobro IK on a deal until June 2024. After two years at Hobro, Brajanax was sold to Danish Superliga club Randers FC on 1 February 2024, signing a deal until June 2027.

On 17 June 2024 it was confirmed that Brajanac returned to Norway as he had signed a deal until 2027 with Vålerenga. In August 2025, Brajanac joined Danish 1st Division side Esbjerg fB on a deal until June 2029.

== Honours ==
Individual

- Norwegian First Division Player of the Month: August 2024
