= Lasse Qvigstad (footballer) =

Norwegian footballer (born 2003)

Personal information
- Date of birth: 10 August 2003 (age 23)
- Height: 1.88 m (6 ft 2 in)
- Positions: Centre-back; full-back

Team information
- Current team: Bryne
- Number: 17

Youth career
- –2018: Trygg/Lade
- 2019–2021: Rosenborg

Senior career*
Years	Team	Apps	(Gls)
2021–2023	Rosenborg 2	43	(5)
2023	→ Ranheim (loan)	12	(0)
2023–2024	Ranheim	18	(0)
2024–	Bryne	31	(3)

International career
2023	Norway U21	2	(0)
- * Club domestic league appearances and goals as of 18 April 2026

Lasse Qvigstad (born 10 August 2003) is a Norwegian footballer who plays as a centre-back or full-back for Bryne FK.

== Career ==
Hailing from Trondheim, he played youth football for SK Trygg/Lade before joining the academy of giants Rosenborg BK in 2019. He signed a professional contract in 2022, and also played a friendly match, but was not a part of the first-team squad. Rather, he played for the B team.

In March 2023 he was loaned out to Ranheim IL, a move that was made permanent in the summer. Qvigstad also made his youth international debut, playing twice for Norway U21 in June 2023, both against Scotland U21.

In the summer of 2024 he was bought by Bryne FK. The team won promotion to the 2025 Eliteserien, where Qvigstad made his first-tier debut in March 2025 against Bodø/Glimt. He also prolonged his contract until 2028.

== Personal life ==
The jurist Lasse Qvigstad is a first cousin of the footballer Lasse Qvigstad's paternal grandfather.
