= Malte Fismen =

Norwegian footballer (born 2010)

Personal information
- Date of birth: 6 April 2010 (age 16)
- Place of birth: Bergen, Norway
- Height: 1.79 m (5 ft 10 in)
- Position: Winger

Team information
- Current team: Åsane
- Number: 26

Youth career
- Varegg
- 2023–2025: Åsane

Senior career*
Years	Team	Apps	(Gls)
2025	Åsane 2	15	(5)
2025–	Åsane	25	(2)

International career^{‡}
2025	Norway U15	5	(2)
2026–	Norway U16	4	(0)
- * Club domestic league appearances and goals as of 14 November 2026 ‡ National team caps and goals as of 2 November 2026

Malte Fismen (born 6 April 2010) is a Norwegian professional footballer who plays as a winger for Åsane.

== Club career ==
Fismen is a youth product of Bergen-based Varegg Fotball, from which he joined the Åsane academy in 2023.

In January 2025, Fismen played his first unofficial game for Åsane's first team, during a Friendly against SK Brann, aged only 14.

In April 2025, he signed his first professional contract with the club, just after playing his first Norwegian Third Division game with the reserve.

Fismen made his first-team debut with Åsane in a 5–1 Norwegian Cup win over Askøy FK on 12 April 2025.

He started his first team career in the Norwegian First Division that same year, and scored his first goal for them on 13 August 2025, during a 3–2 Cup win over Gneist.

By the 2026 season he had become a regular starter and one of the stars of Åsane, attracting interest from both Norwegian giants like Brann, Molde and Bodø/Glimt, but also foreign clubs like Serie A teams Inter and Como or Eredivisie club Feyenoord.

But despite the intense transfer rumours even pushing him out of the squad for several weeks, the young player eventually elected to stay with the club by the autumn 2026.

== International career ==
Fismen is a youth international for Norway, having played for the under-15 and under-16.
