= Sebastian Olderheim =

Norwegian footballer

Personal information
- Date of birth: 8 July 2007 (age 19)
- Position: Midfielder

Team information
- Current team: Stabæk
- Number: 17

Youth career
- –2024: Stabæk

Senior career*
Years	Team	Apps	(Gls)
2023–	Stabæk 2	17	(4)
2023–	Stabæk	76	(14)

International career^{‡}
2022	Norway U15	5	(1)
2023	Norway U16	11	(2)
2024	Norway U17	3	(0)
2024–	Norway U18	11	(3)
2025–	Norway U19	5	(4)
- * Club domestic league appearances and goals as of 14 November 2026 ‡ National team caps and goals as of 21 September 2025

Sebastian Olderheim (born 8 July 2007) is a Norwegian professional footballer who plays as a midfielder for the Norwegian First Division club Stabæk.

== Club career ==
He hails from Høvik in Bærum. Olderheim is a youth product of Stabæk. On 29 August 2022, he signed his first professional contract with Stabæk. On 20 September 2023, he extended his contract with the club until 2026. He made his senior and professional debut with Stabæk as a late substitute in a 4–0 Eliteserien loss to Bodø/Glimt on 5 November 2023.

== International career ==
Olderheim is a youth international for Norway having played up to the Norway U18s.

== Career statistics ==
As of 14 November 2026

Appearances and goals by club, season and competition
Club	Season	League			National Cup		Total	
Club	Season	Division	Apps	Goals	Apps	Goals	Apps	Goals
Stabæk 2	2023	3. divisjon	16	4	—		16	4
Stabæk 2	2025	3. divisjon	1	0	—		1	0
Stabæk 2	Total		17	4	—		17	4
Stabæk	2023	Eliteserien	3	0	1	0	4	0
Stabæk	2024	1. divisjon	26	6	4	3	30	9
Stabæk	2025	1. divisjon	29	3	7	2	36	5
Stabæk	2026	1. divisjon	18	5	3	1	21	6
Stabæk	Total		76	14	15	6	91	20
Career total			93	18	15	6	108	24

== Honours ==
Individual

- Norwegian First Division Young Player of the Month: April 2024
