= Thomas Pereira (footballer) =

Norwegian footballer (born 1973)

Personal information
- Full name: Thomas Austin Pereira
- Date of birth: 12 June 1973 (age 53)
- Place of birth: Sarpsborg, Norway
- Height: 1.76 m (5 ft 9 in)
- Position: Left-back

Youth career
- Yven IF

Senior career*
| Years | Team | Apps | (Gls) |
| ?–1995 | Sarpsborg | | |
| 1994 | → Aalborg Chang (loan) | | |
| 1996–1997 | Moss | 23 | (1) |
| 1997–2009 | Viking | 230 | (3) |

International career
| 2002 | Norway B | 2 | (0) |
| 1997–2003 | Norway | 8 | (0) |

Managerial career
- 2011: Randaberg
- 2016–2023: Viking 2
- 2023–2024: Sandnes Ulf
- * Club domestic league appearances and goals

Thomas Austin Pereira (12 June 1973) is a retired Norwegian footballer who was recently the manager of Sandnes Ulf. He spent most of his career at Viking FK in Eliteserien, playing a total of 433 official matches for the club.

== Club career ==
He played several seasons for Sarpsborg FK. In 1994 he spent time on loan at Aalborg Chang while also attending the folk high school Nordjyllands Idrætshøjskole.

Thomas Pereira arrived at Viking from Moss in 1997, and stayed at the club the rest of his career. At the end of the 2008 season, he was ranked 7th on Viking's all-time list of appearances. On October 10, 2008, he signed a new one-year contract with Viking, stating that it could never be another club. After his thirteenth and last season in Viking he was awarded a testimonial game that was played on 21 November 2009 against SK Brann. Testimonial games are very rare in Norwegian football.

== International career ==
He made his international debut against South Korea in 1997, and has a total of 8 senior international caps.

== Coaching career ==
After his retirement, he was hired as head coach of Randaberg, but after one season he came back to Viking to work as physical coach.

Pereira became the manager of Viking FK's reserve team, Viking 2, in 2016.

== Personal life ==
His father was born in Protectorate of Uganda but was raised in Portuguese Goa while his mother is Norwegian.

In 2017 his son Adrian Pereira made his debut for Viking FK's senior team aged 17. Adrian is currently playing for Rosenborg BK.
