= Jacob Hanstad =

Norwegian footballer (born 2002)

Personal information
- Date of birth: 2 November 2002 (age 24)
- Height: 1.82 m (6 ft 0 in)
- Position: Left winger

Team information
- Current team: Stabæk
- Number: 24

Youth career
- Koll
- Lyn

Senior career*
Years	Team	Apps	(Gls)
2019–2020	Lyn	4	(0)
2021–2022	Kjelsås	42	(5)
2023–2024	Lyn	37	(8)
2025	Fredrikstad	2	(0)
2025–2026	Sandefjord	12	(1)
2026–	Stabæk	26	(10)

International career^{‡}
2021	Norway U19	1	(0)
- * Club domestic league appearances and goals as of 14 November 2026 ‡ National team caps and goals as of 2 April 2026

Jacob Hanstad (born 2 November 2002) is a Norwegian footballer who plays as a winger for Stabæk.

He started his youth career in Koll and Lyn and attended a football programme at Valle Hovin Upper Secondary School. In 2019 he made his senior debut for Lyn, but tore a cruciate ligament in 2020. He continued his career in Second Division club Kjelsås, and was also called up to a single outing for Norway U19 against France U19 in 2021.

Hanstad returned to Lyn in 2023 as the club was promoted to the 2024 1. divisjon. He was bought by Fredrikstad FK in 2025, made his Eliteserien debut and scored three cup goals, but failed to break through and after half a year he went on to Sandefjord. At the end of the 2025–26 winter transfer window, Sandefjord decided to sell Hanstad. He was in talks with FK Haugesund, but chose Stabæk.

== Honours ==
Individual

- Norwegian First Division Young Player of the Month: October 2024
