= Jacob Haahr =

Danish footballer (born 2002)

Personal information
- Full name: Jacob Haahr Steffensen
- Date of birth: 10 March 2002 (age 24)
- Height: 1.87 m (6 ft 2 in)
- Position: Centre-back

Team information
- Current team: Bryne
- Number: 5

Youth career
- –2016: Fløng-Hedehusene
- 2016–2021: FC Copenhagen

Senior career*
Years	Team	Apps	(Gls)
2021–2024	Fremad Amager	69	(0)
2024–	Bryne	59	(2)

International career
2017–2018	Denmark U16	9	(1)
2018–2019	Denmark U17	13	(1)
2019	Denmark U18	3	(1)
2019–2020	Denmark U19	6	(0)
2021	Denmark U20	1	(0)
- * Club domestic league appearances and goals as of 17 April 2026

Jacob Haahr Steffensen (born 10 March 2002) is a Danish footballer who plays as a centre-back for Bryne FK.

Hailing from Fløng, he played for local club Fløng-Hedehusene Fodbold until being discovered by giants FC Copenhagen as a U14 player. He was allowed to play friendly matches for the senior team in January 2019, and made his competitive first-team debut in the 2018–19 Danish Cup third round against Viby. Haahr was also capped 30 times for the Danish youth international teams between U16 and U20.

In January 2021, Haahr left FCK for Fremad Amager in the outskirts of Copenhagen. The transfer entailed an option to buy him back, should FCK wish that. He made his Danish 1st Division debut in March 2021 against Silkeborg.

Letting his contract run its course in January 2024, he left Fremad Amager as the club had descended into "chaos". His dream was to build his career and ultimately reach the Bundesliga. He received an offer from Norwegian club Bryne FK. The reason he ended up in southwestern Norway was that his sister lived in Norway and her Norwegian boyfriend had a connection.

Bryne won promotion to the 2025 Eliteserien, reaching that level for the first time since 2003. Haahr made his debut on the first tier in March 2025 against Bodø/Glimt. The team was however relegated again, having reached and lost a playoff. In 2026 Haahr was designated team captain.
