= Eirik Saunes =

Norwegian footballer (born 1998)

Personal information
- Full name: Eirik Franke Saunes
- Date of birth: 22 September 1998 (age 28)
- Place of birth: Bærum, Norway
- Height: 1.89 m (6 ft 2 in)
- Positions: Central midfielder; defensive midfielder

Team information
- Current team: KFUM
- Number: 19

Youth career
- 2004–2016: Hødd

Senior career*
Years	Team	Apps	(Gls)
2017–2022	Hødd	134	(21)
2023–2025	Bryne	66	(5)
2026–	KFUM	4	(0)
- * Club domestic league appearances and goals as of 14 April 2026

Eirik Saunes (born 22 September 1998) is a Norwegian footballer who plays as a midfielder for KFUM.

== Personal life ==
He was born in Bærum as a son of football manager Hallstein Saunes, who managed Lyn in the mid-1990s. Hallstein Saunes became manager of IL Hødd in 1999, and Eirik Saunes grew up in Ulsteinvik where he enrolled in Hødd at the age of 6.

He was participating in athletics as a child, and ran the half marathon in 1:21:18 shortly after his 16th birthday. He was involved in a charity project in Brazilian favelas called Karanba.

== Career ==
Saunes made his first-team debut for Hødd in May 2017. He amassed 134 league games and 10 cup games in six seasons, all spent in the 2. divisjon. Having helped Hødd win promotion to the 2023 1. divisjon, he nonetheless left the club to sign for another First Division club ahead of the 2023 season, Bryne FK.

Bryne won promotion to the 2025 Eliteserien, and Saunes subsequently made his first-tier debut in April 2025 against Haugesund. He expressed joy in playing for the club with its underdog and rural farming image. His goal celebration was a reindeer imitation.

Following Bryne's instant relegation, he continued in the Eliteserien with KFUM.
