= Einar Iversen (footballer) =

Norwegian footballer (born 2001)

Personal information
- Date of birth: 6 June 2001 (age 25)
- Place of birth: Bergen, Norway
- Position: Midfielder

Team information
- Current team: Åsane
- Number: 5

Youth career
- ? – 2017: Stord IL
- 2017–2023: Everton

Senior career*
Years	Team	Apps	(Gls)
2024–	Åsane	51	(5)

International career^{‡}
2020	Norway U-19	2	(0)
- * Club domestic league appearances and goals as of 14 November 2026 ‡ National team caps and goals as of 7 August 2024

Einar Hjellestad Iversen (born 6 June 2001 in Bergen) is a Norwegian footballer currently playing as midfielder for Åsane Fotball in the Norwegian First Division. Originally from Stord, he was part of the Everton F.C.'s U18, U21 and U23 teams from 2017 to 2023.

== Biography ==
Iversen was born on 6 June 2001 in Bergen, Norway to a dentist mother and an HR manager father. He grew up watching his older brother Jakob play football and started training in first grade. His youth team was FK Fyllingsdalen and he trained under Martin Ødegaard at a talent camp as a teenager.

In 2017, at age 16, Iversen was scouted to join the academy team for Everton in England. He signed a contract and had his debut on the U-18 team that September against Liverpool. He played regularly for the 2017/18 and 2018/19 seasons, and was named both captain and the academy's best player in 2019, receiving the Keith Tamlin Award at the end of the season. In early 2019, he was selected for Norway's U-19 team.

That summer, he signed a three-year contract with Everton's U-21 team. By January 2020, he had started three Premier League 2 games. He sustained an ACL injury early in the 2020/21 season that required surgery. Nine months later, he pulled his hamstring, requiring another five weeks of rest; he subsequently tore it again, this time seriously enough to require an operation in February 2022. He only played five games in the 2020/21 season. Everton extended his contract for a year in 2022 despite him being sidelined for 16 months. He returned to the pitch in January 2023 as a late sub against West Ham United's U-21s. He was released from Everton in June 2023 and signed a two-year contract with the Norwegian club Åsane Fotball. By November 2023, he had played 14 international matches for Norway.
