= Júlíus Mar Júlíusson =

Icelandic footballer (born 2004)

Júlíus Júlíusson
Personal information
- Full name: Júlíus Mar Júlíusson
- Date of birth: 7 June 2004 (age 22)
- Height: 1.92 m (6 ft 4 in)
- Position: Centre-back

Team information
- Current team: Kristiansund
- Number: 4

Youth career
- Fjölnir

Senior career*
Years	Team	Apps	(Gls)
2022–2024	Fjölnir		
2025	KR	16	(0)
2026–	Kristiansund	1	(0)

International career^{‡}
	Iceland U19	3	(0)
	Iceland U21	4	(0)
- * Club domestic league appearances and goals as of 27 March 2026 ‡ National team caps and goals as of 27 March 2026

Júlíus Mar Júlíusson (born 7 June 2004) is an Icelandic footballer who plays as a defender for Kristiansund BK.

He went on trial to Italian clubs Torino FC and Hellas Verona in 2022. He was capped for Iceland U19 and Iceland U21.

Starting his career in Ungmennafélagið Fjölnir, after the 2024 season he signed for traditional league contenders Knattspyrnufélag Reykjavíkur. He made his Besta deild debut in April 2025 against FH.

Following his first season in KR, Júlíus Mar was sold to Kristiansund BK in Norway. In his Eliteserien debut in March 2026, Júlíus Mar's Kristiansund beat compatriot Freyr Alexandersson's team Brann.
