= Luis Görlich =

German footballer (born 2000)

Personal information
- Date of birth: 1 April 2000 (age 26)
- Place of birth: Heidelberg, Germany
- Height: 1.81 m (5 ft 11 in)
- Position: Full-back

Team information
- Current team: VVV-Venlo

Youth career
- –2018: 1899 Hoffenheim

Senior career*
| Years | Team | Apps | (Gls) |
| 2018–2021 | 1899 Hoffenheim II | 59 | (2) |
| 2021–2022 | Eintracht Braunschweig | 3 | (0) |
| 2022–2024 | PEC Zwolle | 19 | (4) |
| 2024–2025 | Bryne | 35 | (3) |
| 2025–2026 | SSV Ulm | 11 | (0) |
| 2026– | VVV-Venlo | 0 | (0) |
- * Club domestic league appearances and goals as of 27 May 2026

Luis Görlich (born 1 April 2000) is a German professional footballer who plays as a full-back for Eerste Divisie club VVV-Venlo.

== Career ==
Görlich came through the academy at 1899 Hoffenheim before leaving the club in June 2021 having been a regular starter for the club's second team during the 2020-21 season, making 33 appearances both as a right-back and in right midfield. In total, he made 59 fourth-division appearances, scoring two goals and providing four assists, and appeared nine times in the UEFA Youth League for the club, but not made any appearances in the Bundesliga. He subsequently played for Eintracht Braunschweig. After one season at Braunschweig he looked to move on for more game time as they had plenty of options in the right flank positions.

Görlich impressed on trial at PEC Zwolle in the summer of 2022. He signed a two-year contract with the option for a third on 3 August 2022. Görlich scored his first goal in the Eerste Divisie away at SC Telstar in a 5–0 victory at their BUKO Stadion. He followed this up with a brace in a 4–0 away victory over VVV Venlo at their De Koel Stadion. This meant he had scored three goals in his first three games for PEC Zwolle.

He signed for Norwegian club Bryne FK of the OBOS-ligaen in 2024. He made his debut for the club as a second half substitute on 1 April 2024, in a 3-1 home win over IK Start. He scored his first league goal for the club the following month in a 2-0 win over Aalesund. He was a key contributor to Bryne FK's promotion to the Eliteserien with 3 goals and 9 assists.

He signed for German club SSV Ulm of the 3. Liga in 2025.

On 8 June 2026, Görlich signed a two-year contract with an option for a further season with Dutch Eerste Divisie club VVV-Venlo.

== Personal life ==
He is from Heidelberg, and is the son of the former managing director of 1899 Hoffenheim, Peter Görlich.
