= Lars Erik Sødal =

Norwegian footballer (born 2002)

Personal information
- Date of birth: 26 May 2002 (age 24)
- Position: Midfielder

Team information
- Current team: Bryne
- Number: 8

Youth career
- –2017: Hinna
- 2018–2021: Viking

Senior career*
Years	Team	Apps	(Gls)
2021–2023	Viking	0	(0)
2021	→ Egersund (loan)	9	(2)
2022	→ Sandnes Ulf (loan)	22	(2)
2023	→ Bryne (loan)	28	(2)
2024–	Bryne	73	(6)

International career
2018	Norway U16	6	(0)
2020	Norway U18	2	(0)
2021	Norway U19	1	(0)
- * Club domestic league appearances and goals as of 14 November 2026

Lars Erik Sødal (born 26 May 2002) is a Norwegian footballer who plays as a midfielder for Bryne.

== Career ==
On 11 June 2020, he signed his first professional contract with Viking. In August 2021, he was loaned out to Egersund. In March 2022, he was loaned out to Sandnes Ulf.

After spending one season on loan, Sødal moved on a permanent contract with Bryne, starting from 2024.

== Career statistics ==
As of match played 14 November 2026

Appearances and goals by club, season and competition
Club	Season	League			National cup		Other		Total	
Club	Season	Division	Apps	Goals	Apps	Goals	Apps	Goals	Apps	Goals
Viking	2021	Eliteserien	0	0	1	0	—		1	0
Viking	2022	Eliteserien	0	0	0	0	—		0	0
Viking	2023	Eliteserien	0	0	1	0	—		1	0
Viking	Total		0	0	2	0	—		2	0
Egersund (loan)	2021	2. divisjon	9	2	0	0	—		9	2
Sandnes Ulf (loan)	2022	1. divisjon	22	2	3	0	1 (Note: Appearance(s) in Eliteserien play-offs)	0	26	2
Bryne (loan)	2023	1. divisjon	28	2	2	0	1	0	31	2
Bryne	2024	1. divisjon	21	3	3	0	—		24	3
Bryne	2025	Eliteserien	25	0	3	1	2	0	30	1
Bryne	2026	Norwegian First Division	27	3	5	2	0	0	32	5
Bryne	Total		73	6	11	3	2	0	86	9
Career total			132	12	18	3	4	0	154	15
