= 2026 IK Start season =

Start
2026 season
- Chairman: Anders Hansson
- Head coach: Azar Karadas
- Stadium: Sør Arena
- Eliteserien: 16th
- 2026–27 Norwegian Cup: Pre-season
- Biggest win: Start 2–0 Vålerenga
- Biggest defeat: Bodø/Glimt 5–0 Start
Home colours	Away colours

The 2026 season is the 121st season in the history of Idrettsklubben Start and the first in the Eliteserien since 2020 after promotion. In addition, IK Start will participate in the 2026–27 Norwegian Football Cup.

On 20 March 2026, the club extended head coach Azar Karadas's contract until the end of 2028.

== Transfers ==
=== In ===
Pos.	Player	Transferred from	Fee	Date	Source
FW	(Norway) Felix Kutsche Eriksen	(Norway) Våg		1 January 2026	
FW	(Denmark) Jesper Cornelius	(Denmark) Lyngby		12 January 2026	
DF	(Norway) Erlend Dahl Reitan	(Norway) Rosenborg BK		21 February 2026	
FW	(Ghana) James Ampofo	(Norway) Strømsgodset		27 March 2026	
FW	(Norway) Felix Kutsche Eriksen	(Norway) Arendal	Loan return (early)	22 May 2026	
FW	(Nigeria) Ahmed Adebayo	(Malta) Valletta	Loan return	30 June 2026	

=== Out ===
Pos.	Player	Transferred to	Fee	Date	Source
FW	(Nigeria) Ahmed Adebayo	(Malta) Valletta	Loan	26 January 2026	
FW	(Norway) Felix Kutsche Eriksen	(Norway) Arendal	Loan	25 March 2026	
MF	(Norway) Deni Dashaev	(Norway) Strømmen IF	Loan	30 March 2026	

== Pre-season and friendlies ==
3 February 2026 Friendly	Start	2–0	Vindbjart

6 February 2026 Friendly	Viking	4–0	Start

13 February 2026 Friendly	Lyn	0–2	Start

17 February 2026 Friendly	Start	2–0	Donn

24 February 2026 Friendly	Rosenborg	2–1	Start

28 February 2026 Friendly	Bryne	2–2	Start

8 March 2026 Friendly	Sandefjord	3–2	Start

27 March 2026 Friendly	Tromsø	1–0	Start

4 July 2026 Friendly	Bodø/Glimt	4–0	Start	Bodø
16:00	Sjøvold 27', 84'; Høgh 65'; Helmersen 90+2'			Stadium: Aspmyra Stadion

== Competitions ==
=== Overall record ===
Competition	First match	Last match	Starting round	Record							
Competition	First match	Last match	Starting round	Pld	W	D	L	GF	GA	GD	Win %
Eliteserien	15 March 2026		Matchday 1	26	5	4	17	27	59	−32	19.23
2026–27 Norwegian Football Cup				0	0	0	0	0	0	+0	—
Total				26	5	4	17	27	59	−32	19.23

Source: Competitions

=== Eliteserien ===
Pos	Team	Pld	W	D	L	GF	GA	GD	Pts	Qualification or relegation
12	Fredrikstad	26	8	6	12	31	46	−15	30	
13	Sandefjord	26	7	7	12	31	39	−8	28	
14	Kristiansund	26	7	5	14	30	51	−21	26	Qualification for the relegation play-offs
15	Aalesund	26	5	9	12	45	60	−15	24	Relegation to First Division
16	Start	26	5	4	17	27	59	−32	19	Relegation to First Division

Updated to match(es) played on 9 November 2026. Source: Football Association of Norway (in Norwegian)
Rules for classification: 1) Points; 2) Goal difference; 3) Goals scored; 4) Head-to-head points; 5) Head-to-head goal difference; 6) Head-to-head goals scored.

==== Results summary ====
Overall								Home						Away					
Pld	W	D	L	GF	GA	GD	Pts	W	D	L	GF	GA	GD	W	D	L	GF	GA	GD
0	0	0	0	0	0	0	0	0	0	0	0	0	0	0	0	0	0	0	0

==== Results by round ====
Round	1	2	3	4	5	6	7	8	9	10	11	12	13	14	15	16	17	18
Ground	A	H	A	A	H	A	H	H	A	H	A	H	A	H	A	H	H	A
Result	L	D	D	L	D	L	D	L	L	W	L							L
Position																		

Updated to match(es) played on May 2026. Source:
A = Away; H = Home; W = Win; D = Draw; L = Loss

==== Matches ====
The match schedule was issued on 19 December 2025.

15 March 2026 1	KFUM Oslo	2–0	Start

21 March 2026 2	Start	1–1	Aalesund	Kristiansand
				Stadium: Sør Arena

6 April 2026 3	Sarpsborg 08	1–1	Start

11 April 2026 4	Lillestrøm	3–1	Start

19 April 2026 5	Start	1–1	Molde	Kristiansand
				Stadium: Sør Arena

26 April 2026 6	HamKam	2–1	Start

30 April 2026 18	Bodø/Glimt	5–0	Start

3 May 2026 7	Start	1–1	Tromsø	Kristiansand
				Stadium: Sør Arena

16 May 2026 9	Viking	6–3	Start

20 May 2026 8	Start	1–4	Bodø/Glimt	Kristiansand
				Stadium: Sør Arena

25 May 2026 10	Start	2–0	Vålerenga	Kristiansand
				Stadium: Sør Arena

29 May 2026 11	Fredrikstad	2–1	Start	Fredrikstad
19:00				Stadium: Fredrikstad Stadion; Referee: Kristoffer Hagenes

=== Norwegian Football Cup ===
22–23 August 2026 First round	Flekkefjord	v	Start
