= Paya Pichkah =

Swedish footballer (born 2000)

Personal information
- Date of birth: 21 March 2000 (age 26)
- Place of birth: Qaem Shahr, Iran
- Height: 1.90 m (6 ft 3 in)
- Position: Defensive midfielder

Team information
- Current team: Bryne
- Number: 77

Youth career
- –2018: GIF Sundsvall

Senior career*
Years	Team	Apps	(Gls)
2018–2023	GIF Sundsvall	94	(9)
2024–2025	IF Brommapojkarna	16	(0)
2025	→ Egersunds IK (loan)	27	(0)
2026–	Bryne	20	(0)

International career^{‡}
2017	Sweden U17	3	(0)
2018	Sweden U18	1	(0)
2017–2018	Sweden U19	4	(0)
- * Club domestic league appearances and goals as of 14 November 2026 ‡ National team caps and goals as of 3 April 2022

Paya Pichkah (born 21 March 2000) is a Swedish footballer who plays as a midfielder for Bryne FK in the Norwegian First Division.

== Club career ==
Paya Pichkah made his Allsvenskan debut for GIF Sundsvall on 3 April 2022 during the 2022 season against IK Sirius at the Studenternas IP.

In February 2024, Pichkah joined Allsvenskan side IF Brommapojkarna ahead of the 2024 season. He went on loan to Norwegian side Egersunds IK in 2025.

In January 2026, Pichkah joined Norwegian First Division side Bryne FK ahead of the 2026 season.

== International career ==
Pichkah has played for the Sweden men's national under-17 football team in 2017 against Slovakia, Norway, and Romania, and has played for the Sweden men's national under-19 football team in 2018 where he was called up for their 2019 UEFA European Under-19 Championship qualification campaign.
