= Andreas Skovgaard =

Danish footballer (born 1997)

Personal information
- Date of birth: 27 March 1997 (age 29)
- Place of birth: Hagendrup, Denmark
- Height: 1.84 m (6 ft 0 in)
- Position: Centre-back

Team information
- Current team: Malisheva
- Number: 27

Youth career
- FC Nordsjælland

Senior career*
Years	Team	Apps	(Gls)
2016–2018	FC Nordsjælland	77	(0)
2019–2021	Heerenveen	0	(0)
2020	→ Örebro (loan)	26	(1)
2021	Örebro	23	(0)
2022–2023	Brann	22	(1)
2023	Stabæk	17	(0)
2023–2025	Cracovia	29	(0)
2024–2025	Cracovia II	7	(0)
2025–2026	Bryne	9	(0)
2026–	Malisheva	11	(0)

International career
2016	Denmark U19	2	(0)
2016–2017	Denmark U20	2	(0)
2018	Denmark U21	1	(0)
- * Club domestic league appearances and goals as of 22 June 2026

Andreas Skovgaard Larsen (born 27 March 1997) is a Danish professional footballer who plays as a centre-back for Kosovo club Malisheva.

== Career ==
Skovgaard received his professional debut for FC Nordsjælland on 28 February 2016 against Viborg FF in the Danish Superliga, that ended with a 1–1 draw. He came on the pitch in the 85nd minute, where he replaced Tobias Mikkelsen.

He was promoted to the first-team squad in March 2016 and he also signed a new professional contract until 2018.

Skovgaard left Nordsjælland at the end of his contract, which was at the end of 2018. This was announced on 18 December 2018.

On 5 February 2020, it was announced that Skoovgard will go on a season long loan to Swedish club Örebro SK in Allsvenskan. After returning to Heerenveen, his contract was terminated by mutual consent on 1 February 2021.

On 12 February 2021, Örebro SK announced that they had signed Skovgaard permanently on a two-year deal.

On 27 February 2022, he signed for Norwegian club SK Brann with a contract lasting until the end of 2024. In February 2023 he moved to Stabæk.

On 29 August 2023, Skovgaard joined Polish Ekstraklasa club Cracovia on a three-year deal. On 28 August 2025, he and Cracovia mutually agreed to part ways.

On 11 September 2025, Skovgaard joined Norwegian Eliteserien club Bryne on a deal out the season. Before moving to Malisheva on 2 March 2026.

== Honours ==
Brann

- Norwegian First Division: 2022

Cracovia II

- IV liga Lesser Poland: 2024–25
