= Lasse Qvigstad =

Norwegian jurist

Lars Fredrik "Lasse" Qvigstad (born 2 February 1946) is a Norwegian jurist.

He was born in Oslo. He worked as a lecturer at the University of Oslo from 1972 to 1975, public prosecutor in Eidsivating Court of Appeal from 1977 to 1987, deputy chief of police in Oslo from 1987 to 1991 and presiding judge in Eidsivating Court of Appeal from 1991 to 1993. He then returned to the position as public prosecutor from 1993 to his retirement in 2016. He is especially known as prosecutor in the espionage case against Arne Treholt.
