= Nicklas Strunck =

Danish footballer (born 1999)

Personal information
- Full name: Nicklas Strunck Jakobsen
- Date of birth: 17 August 1999 (age 27)
- Place of birth: Ølstykke, Denmark
- Height: 1.85 m (6 ft 1 in)
- Position: Midfielder

Team information
- Current team: Esbjerg
- Number: 7

Youth career
- Ølstykke
- Stenløse
- Frederikssund
- Nordsjælland

Senior career*
Years	Team	Apps	(Gls)
2018–2019	Nordsjælland	27	(3)
2019–2021	Groningen	0	(0)
2020–2021	→ Esbjerg (loan)	26	(3)
2021–2025	Esbjerg	109	(20)
2025–2026	Bryne	47	(10)
2026–	Esbjerg	9	(1)

International career
2014–2015	Denmark U16	7	(0)
2015–2016	Denmark U17	17	(3)
2016–2017	Denmark U18	5	(0)
2017–2018	Denmark U19	5	(0)
2018–2019	Denmark U20	3	(0)
- * Club domestic league appearances and goals as of 09:36, 11 November 2026 (UTC)

Nicklas Strunck Jakobsen (Danish pronunciation: [ˈstʁɔŋk]; born 17 August 1999) is a Danish professional footballer who plays as a midfielder for Danish 1st Division club Esbjerg.

== Youth career ==
Strunck started his career with Ølstykke, but after being demoted to the second team, his father, Kenn Strunck Jakobsen, decided to transfer him to Stenløse BK, where he himself had once played on the first team as a senior. Strunck played for Stenløse in two years, before joining Frederikssund, where he also played for two years. As an under-15 player, he joined FC Nordsjælland. He won the U17 Talent of the Year award in 2016 by the Danish Football Association in 2016.

== Club career ==
=== Nordsjælland ===
Strunck got his first senior call up on 11 February 2018, where he sat on the bench for the whole game against SønderjyskE in the Danish Superliga. He made his debut for FC Nordsjælland only five days later at the age of 18. Strunck started on the bench, but replaced Mikkel Damsgaard in the 91st minute in a 2–1 victory against OB.

Strunck was officially promoted the first team squad for the 2018–19 season. Strunck signed a contract extension in July 2018 until 2021.

=== Groningen ===
On 11 August 2019, Strunck was signed by Dutch Eredivisie club FC Groningen for a reported fee of around €500,000. He moved to Groningen on a four-year contract.

=== Esbjerg ===
After no appearances for Groningen, Strunck was sent on a one-season loan to Danish 1st Division club Esbjerg fB on 5 October 2020 for the 2020–21 season.

On 4 June 2021 Esbjerg confirmed, that Strunck had signed a permanent deal with the club until June 2025. On 11 July, he was appointed team captain of the club, before controversial manager Peter Hyballa gave the captain's armband to 19-year-old Mads Larsen on 24 July. Esbjerg suffered relegation to the third-tier Danish 2nd Division with Strunck as a starter, before securing promotion back to the second tier in 2024.

=== Bryne ===
On 31 January 2025, Strunck joined Norwegian Eliteserien side Bryne FK on a two-year deal.

=== Return to Esbjerg ===
On 28 August 2026, Strunck returned to Esbjerg, signing a three-year contract.

== Honours ==
Esbjerg fB

- Danish 2nd Division: 2023–24
