= Sanel Bojadzic =

German footballer (born 1998

Personal information
- Date of birth: 29 October 1998 (age 28)
- Place of birth: Duisburg, Germany
- Height: 1.81 m (5 ft 11 in)
- Position: Forward

Team information
- Current team: Odd
- Number: 9

Youth career
- –2016: Klepp

Senior career*
Years	Team	Apps	(Gls)
2015–2016	Klepp	22	(23)
2017	Vidar	15	(0)
2018	Egersund	3	(0)
2019–2020	Brodd	12	(4)
2021	Fram Larvik	13	(6)
2022–2024	Levanger	72	(41)
2024–2026	Bryne	33	(9)
2026–	Odd	29	(10)
- * Club domestic league appearances and goals as of 1 November 2026

Sanel Bojadzic (born 29 October 1998) is a Norwegian professional footballer who plays as a forward for Odd.

== Early life ==
Bojadzic was born on 29 October 1998 in Duisburg, Germany to a Montenegrin mother and a Kosovan father. At the age of three, he moved with his family to Harstad, Norway. Afterwards, he moved with his family to Klepp Municipality, Norway.

== Career ==
As a youth player, Bojadzic joined the youth academy of Klepp IL and was promoted to the club's senior team in 2015. In 2017, he signed for FK Vidar, where he made fifteen league appearances and scored zero goals. One year later, he signed for Egersunds IK, where he made three league appearances and scored zero goals.

Following his stint there, he signed for IL Brodd in 2019, where he made twelve league appearances and scored four goals. Subsequently, he signed for IF Fram Larvik in 2021, where he made thirteen league appearances and scored six goals. Ahead of the 2022 season, he signed for Levanger FK, where he made seventy-two league appearances and scored forty-one goals and helped the club achieve promotion from the third tier to the second tier. During the summer of 2024, he signed for Bryne FK.

== Career statistics ==
As of 1 November 2026

Appearances and goals by club, season and competition
Club	Season	League			National Cup (Note: Appearances in Norwegian Football Cup)		Continental		Total	
Club	Season	Division	Apps	Goals	Apps	Goals	Apps	Goals	Apps	Goals
Klepp	2015	4. divisjon	5	2	1	0	—		6	2
Klepp	2016	4. divisjon	17	21	0	0	—		17	21
Klepp	Total		22	23	1	0	—	—	23	23
Vidar	2017	PostNord-ligaen	15	0	0	0	—		15	0
Egersund	2018	PostNord-ligaen	3	0	0	0	—		3	0
Brodd	2019	Norsk Tipping-ligaen	12	4	0	0	—		12	4
Fram Larvik	2021	PostNord-ligaen	13	6	2	1	—		15	7
Levanger	2022	PostNord-ligaen	25	9	2	1	—		27	10
Levanger	2023	PostNord-ligaen	26	19	1	0	—		27	19
Levanger	2024	OBOS-ligaen	21	13	3	1	—		24	15
Levanger	Total		72	41	6	2	—		78	43
Bryne	2024	OBOS-ligaen	9	3	0	0	—		9	3
Bryne	2025	Eliteserien	24	6	5	1	—		29	7
Bryne	2026	OBOS-ligaen	0	0	1	0	—		1	0
Bryne	Total		33	9	6	1	—		39	10
Odd	2026	OBOS-ligaen	29	10	2	0	—		31	10
Career total			199	93	17	4	—		216	97

== Honours ==
Individual

- Norwegian First Division Player of the Month: April 2024
