= Åsane Fotball =

Norwegian football club

Åsane
- Full name: Åsane Fotball
- Founded: 4 November 1971; 55 years ago
- Ground: Åsane Arena, Bergen
- Capacity: 3,700
- Chairman: Espen D. Brochmann
- Manager: Thomas Lyngbø
- League: 1. divisjon
- 2026: 1. divisjon, 15th of 16 (relegated)
- Website: www.asanefotball.no
Home colours	Away colours

Åsane Fotball is a Norwegian football club based in Åsane. The club currently competing in 1. divisjon, the second tier of the Norwegian football league system, in which they have been participating since their promotion in 2019 2. divisjon. They were relegated from 1. divisjon in 2018.

== Recent history ==
Season		Pos.	Pl.	W	D	L	GS	GA	P	Cup	Notes
2001	2. divisjon	↑1	26	19	4	3	57	17	61	First round	Promoted to the 1. divisjon
2002	1. divisjon	↓ 13	30	8	4	18	41	59	28	Second round	Relegated to the 2. divisjon
2003	2. divisjon	3	26	15	3	8	69	41	48	First round	
2004	2. divisjon	3	26	13	3	10	52	37	42	First round	
2005	2. divisjon	9	26	10	3	13	36	47	33	First round	
2006	2. divisjon	10	26	8	3	15	37	47	27	First round	
2007	2. divisjon	12	26	8	1	17	32	53	25	Second round	Avoided relegation due to the relegation of the reserve teams of Start and Odd Grenland
2008	2. divisjon	6	26	11	4	11	56	53	37	Second round	
2009	2. divisjon	4	26	15	4	7	57	31	49	Second round	
2010	2. divisjon	6	26	11	5	10	49	46	38	First round	
2011	2. divisjon	4	26	11	7	8	51	42	40	Third round	
2012	2. divisjon	3	26	11	7	8	46	44	40	Third round	
2013	2. divisjon	10	26	10	3	13	45	48	33	Second round	
2014	2. divisjon	↑ 1	26	17	4	5	70	27	55	Second round	Promoted to the 1. divisjon
2015	1. divisjon	11	30	8	11	11	46	46	35	Fourth round	
2016	1. divisjon	10	30	10	8	12	36	37	38	Third round	
2017	1. divisjon	12	30	7	12	11	38	56	33	Third round	
2018	1. divisjon	↓ 14	30	9	6	15	38	57	33	Second round	Relegated to the 2. divisjon through play-offs
2019	2. divisjon	↑ 2	26	15	5	6	66	31	50	Second round	Promoted to the 1. divisjon through play-offs
2020	1. divisjon	5	30	12	9	9	60	48	45	Cancelled	
2021	1. divisjon	7	30	11	7	12	44	53	40	Fourth round	
2022	1. divisjon	13	30	8	8	14	42	67	32	First round	
2023	1. divisjon	12	30	9	10	11	41	44	37	Third round	
2024	1. divisjon	11	30	10	7	13	46	52	37	Third round	
2025	1. divisjon	12	30	7	10	13	38	53	31	Fourth round	
2026	1. divisjon	↓ 15	30	7	5	18	42	68	25	Second round	Relegated to the 2. divisjon

== Players ==
=== Current squad ===
As of 3 September, 2026

Note: Flags indicate national team as defined under FIFA eligibility rules; some limited exceptions apply. Players may hold more than one non-FIFA nationality.

No.	Pos.	Nation	Player
1	GK	SWE	Sebastian Selin
4	DF	SEN	Hassou Diaby
5	MF	NOR	Einar Iversen
6	DF	NOR	Sebastian Brudvik
7	MF	NOR	Herman Geelmuyden
8	MF	NOR	Jesper Eikrem (on loan from Brann)
9	FW	NOR	Emanuel Grønner
10	MF	NOR	Kristoffer Barmen (captain)
11	FW	ITA	Leonardo Rossi
12	GK	NOR	Isak Reset-Kalland
14	FW	NOR	Magnus Haga (on loan from Brann II)
15	DF	ROU	Filip Oprea (on loan from Tromsø)
16	DF	NOR	Snorre Furnes
17	MF	NOR	Tobias Furebotn
18	MF	ISL	Breki Baldursson (on loan from Esbjerg)

No.	Pos.	Nation	Player
19	FW	NOR	Joakim Aasen
20	FW	NOR	Stian Nygard
21	MF	NOR	Isak Øyre Nundal
22	DF	NOR	Dennis Møller Wolfe
23	MF	NOR	Gabriel Ramsay
24	GK	NOR	Mathias Klausen (on loan from Brann)
25	MF	NOR	Malvin Ingebrigtsen
26	MF	NOR	Malte Fismen
27	MF	NOR	Luka Aaker-Saldanha
45	DF	NOR	Sverre Haga
52	FW	NOR	Lukas Finnøy
53	MF	NOR	Trym Telle
54	DF	NOR	Martin Henriksen Fosse
77	DF	NOR	Knut Haga
95	GK	NOR	Johannes Kvammen

For season transfers, see List of Norwegian football transfers winter 2024–25, and List of Norwegian football transfers summer 2025.

=== Out on loan ===
Note: Flags indicate national team as defined under FIFA eligibility rules; some limited exceptions apply. Players may hold more than one non-FIFA nationality.

No.	Pos.	Nation	Player

== Åsane Fotball Damer ==
Åsane
- Full name: Åsane Fotball Damer
- Founded: 1997
- Ground: Myrdal kunstgress
- Chairman: Norodd Hjelmeland
- Coach: Eirik Fjeldstad
- League: Toppserien
- 2023: Toppserien, 8th of 10
- Website: http://www.aafd.no
Home colours	Away colours

Åsane Fotball Damer is a Norwegian women's football club located in Åsane, Bergen, Norway. It currently plays in the First Division, the second tier of Norwegian football, where they have played since they were promoted in 2011. The club was formed in 1997, when the sports club Åsane Idrettslag, which encompassed men's and women's teams in various sports, split up into eight different clubs, including Åsane Fotball Damer (the women's football team) and Åsane Fotball (the men's football team), which now constitute separate legal entities, but continue to collaborate. As of 2012, the club has 180 playing members in all age groups, from 7 years old to senior level.

=== Recent history ===
Season		Pos.	Pl.	W	D	L	GS	GA	P	Cup	Notes
2004	2. Division, section 4	9	18	3	4	11	19	51	13		Relegated to 3. Division
2005	3. Division, Hordaland	2	16	10	4	2	51	12	34		
2006	3. Division, Hordaland	1	14	12	1	1	64	11	37		Promoted to 2. Division
2007	2. Division / 4	4	18	11	0	7	44	36	33		
2008	2. Division / 4	4	18	9	1	8	41	54	28	1st round	
2009	2. Division / 4	4	18	8	4	6	30	30	28	2nd round	
2010	2. Division / 4	3	22	14	4	4	74	28	46	2nd round	
2011	2. Division / 4	1	22	20	2	0	113	13	62	2nd round	Promoted to 1. Division
2012	1. Division	7	22	8	4	10	33	36	28	1st round	
2013	1. Division	3	20	12	2	6	44	33	38	2nd round	
2014	1. Division	10	22	5	5	12	19	41	20	1st round	
2015	1. Division	3	22	12	6	4	40	20	42	2nd round	
2016	1. Division	8	22	8	2	12	37	31	26	2nd round	
2017	1. Division	6	22	9	3	10	26	29	30	2nd round	
2018	1. Division	8	22	8	4	10	29	25	28	2nd round	
2019	1. Division	7	22	9	5	8	38	33	32	2nd round	
2020	1. Division	5	18	10	2	6	43	23	32	Preliminary round	
2021	1. Division	2	18	11	3	4	33	19	36	2nd round	
2022	1. Division	2	18	12	3	3	32	8	39	2nd round	Promoted to Toppserien
2023	Toppserien	8	27	7	4	16	29	50	25	4th round	
