= Anton Cajtoft =

Swedish footballer (born 1994)

Personal information
- Full name: Björn Anton Cajtoft
- Date of birth: 13 February 1994 (age 32)
- Place of birth: Jönköping, Sweden
- Height: 1.91 m (6 ft 3 in)
- Position: Goalkeeper

Youth career
- –2008: Bankeryds SK
- 2008–2012: Jönköpings Södra

Senior career*
Years	Team	Apps	(Gls)
2013–2020	Jönköpings Södra	80	(0)
2021–2022	Norrby	60	(0)
2023–2025	Bryne	16	(0)

International career^{‡}
2014	Sweden U19	1	(0)
2014–2017	Sweden U21	12	(0)
- * Club domestic league appearances and goals as of 2 September 2025 ‡ National team caps and goals as of 22 June 2017

Björn Anton Cajtoft (born 13 February 1994) is a Swedish professional footballer who plays as a goalkeeper.

== Club career ==
Cajtoft, the son of a goalkeeper, joined his local club, Bankeryds SK, when he was about five or six years old. He also represented the Småland region as a youth in national competitions. In 2008, he was invited to a youth summer camp with Jönköpings Södra, and he signed later that year.

Cajtoft was promoted to the first-team squad in October 2012, and signed a one-year contract, with the intention of being a third-string keeper. After spending the entire 2012 Superettan season on the bench, he made his team debut on 2 November 2013, playing the full 90 minutes in a 1–0 shutout win over GAIS in the last match of the 2013 season. Following this impressive performance, his contract was extended for two years in December.

Cajtoft started the 2014 season as the third-string keeper once again, but injuries to Niklas Helgesson and Damir Mehić made him the first choice for manager Jimmy Thelin. Once again, he proved himself worthy of a starting spot and played in 27 matches between the sticks that year. The following season, he and Mehic shared goalkeeping duties. Cajtoft appeared in 19 games and recording four shutouts. J-Södra finished as league champions and were promoted to Allsvenskan for the 2016 season. Cajtoft made his first division debut during the season opener on 2 April against Kalmar, recording yet another shutout in a 1–0 win. It was J-Södra's first top-division victory in 47 years.

On 8 January 2021, Cajtoft signed a contract with Norrby for 2 years with an option for a third year.

== International career ==
Cajtoft was selected to play with the Swedish under-19 team in a friendly against Finland on 10 October 2014 in Uppsala. They lost 1-0. The following month, on 14 November, he made his debut for the Swedish U21 team. Facing Cyprus, they tied 1-1, and then won 5–3 after penalties.

In August 2015, Cajtoft was among the 22 players named to the Swedish under-21 team for the 2017 UEFA European Under-21 Championship qualifying tournament. As of 30 May he has been the starting keeper in all five group matches, recording four shutouts.

== Honours ==
=== Club ===
Jönköpings Södra

- Superettan: 2015
