= Bryne Stadion =

Football stadium in Bryne, Norway

Coordinates: 58°43′47″N 5°38′59″E

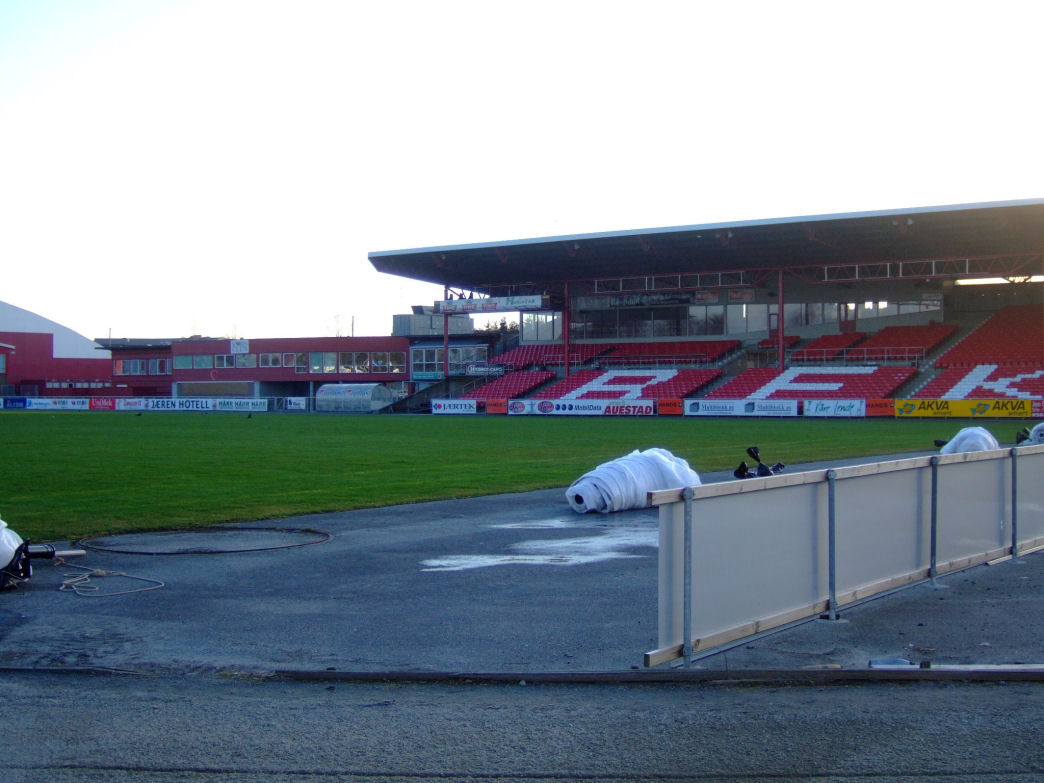
- Interactive map of Bryne Stadion
- Location: Bryne, Norway
- Owner: Bryne FK
- Operator: Bryne FK
- Capacity: 5,000
- Surface: Grass
- Record attendance: 13,621 vs Viking (1980)

Construction
- Opened: 1946

Tenant
- Bryne FK

Bryne Stadion is a multi-purpose stadium in Bryne, Norway. It is currently used mostly for football matches, and is the home ground of Bryne FK. The stadium has a natural grass surface. The record attendance was set in 1980, when 13,621 spectators attended a match against Viking FK.

Ahead of the 2025 Eliteserien season, the capacity of the stadium was increased from 4,000 to 5,000.
