= Duarte Moreira (footballer) =

Portuguese footballer (born 2001)

Personal information
- Full name: Duarte Miguel Ramos Moreira
- Date of birth: 29 September 2001 (age 25)
- Place of birth: Vila Nova de Gaia, Portugal
- Height: 1.83 m (6 ft 0 in)
- Position: Striker

Team information
- Current team: HamKam
- Number: 18

Youth career
- –2017: Padroense
- 2017–2020: Porto
- 2020–2021: Vitória S.C.

Senior career*
Years	Team	Apps	(Gls)
2020–2021	Vitória B	3	(0)
2021–2022	Pevidém	18	(1)
2022–2023	Valadares Gaia	12	(3)
2023–2026	Bryne	91	(27)
2026–	HamKam	0	(0)

International career
2017	Portugal U16	3	(0)
- * Club domestic league appearances and goals as of 13 August 2026

Duarte Moreira (born 29 September 2001) is a Portuguese footballer who plays as a striker for HamKam in the Norwegian Eliteserien.

Born in Vila Nova de Gaia, he played for Padroense when he was selected for Portugal U16 for a series of friendly matches in April 2017. In the same year he joined FC Porto, playing once when the team won the 2018–19 UEFA Youth League, and scoring twice in the 2019–20 UEFA Youth League. However, he did not become professional and spent time with Vitória S.C. B, Pevidém and Valadares Gaia in Portugal's third and fourth tiers.

Hoping to play football for a living, Duarte Moreira travelled to Norway and went on trial with Hamarkameratene in March 2023. A transfer was underway before the 2023 winter transfer window closed, but ultimately fell through. Later, a Portuguese player based in Norway, Cláudio Braga, recommended Moreira to First Division team Bryne FK. Moreira went on trial there and secured a transfer in August 2023.

Starting life abroad in the 2023 1. divisjon, Moreira scored in every other match on average, and soon attracted interest from other clubs. He was described as a "comet" and "biggest star". Outside of football, he spent the first year in 2023–24 as a boarding student at Jæren folk high school at Kleppe. This made it easier to transition into living in a foreign country.

After Bryne won promotion from the 2024 1. divisjon, Moreira made his debut in the Eliteserien against Bodø/Glimt before scoring his first Eliteserien goal the next week against Kristiansund.
