= 2024 Norwegian First Division =

Association football season in Norway

Norwegian First Division
- Season: 2024
- Dates: 1 April – 9 November
- Champions: Vålerenga
- Promoted: Vålerenga; Bryne
- Relegated: Levanger; Sandnes Ulf
- Matches: 240
- Goals: 766 (3.19 per match)
- Top goalscorer: John Hou Sæter (19 goals)
- Biggest home win: Vålerenga 8–0 Sandnes Ulf (23 June 2024)
- Biggest away win: Kongsvinger 0–5 Åsane (16 June 2024)
- Highest scoring: Stabæk 4–5 Egersund (27 May 2024)
- Longest winning run: 9 matches Vålerenga
- Longest unbeaten run: 22 matches Vålerenga
- Longest winless run: 11 matches Sogndal
- Longest losing run: 8 matches Sogndal
- Highest attendance: 24,003 (Note: As sections of Ullevaal were being renovated at the time the capacity was reduced for the Oslo Derby between Lyn and Vålerenga on 20 April. Lyn sponsor IT.no purchased 1100 unavailable tickets at the reduced price of 50 NOK per ticket to symbolically sell out the stadium. Sources vary on whether these 1100 tickets are counted towards the total.); Lyn - Vålerenga (20 April 2024)
- Lowest attendance: 308; Levanger - Lyn (25 September 2024)
- Average attendance: 2,441

The 2024 Norwegian First Division (referred to as OBOS-ligaen for sponsorship reasons) was a Norwegian second-tier football league season.

The season started on 1 April 2024 and ended on 9 November 2024, not including play-off matches.

2024 marked Lyn's return to the second tier following an absence since 2010, coinciding with Vålerenga being relegated from the first tier. The Oslo Derby between the two at Ullevaal stadion in April notably broke the attendance record for the First Division. The previous record was 17,284, a number that was surpassed in ticket sales already two weeks ahead of the match. The final figure is disputed with the figures of 24,003 and 25,103 both being used, in either case far exceeding the former record.

== Teams ==
Locations of teams in the 2024 Norwegian First Division

In the 2023 Norwegian First Division, Fredrikstad, KFUM Oslo and Kristiansund were promoted to the 2024 Eliteserien, while Hødd, Jerv and Skeid were relegated to the 2024 Norwegian Second Division.

Vålerenga, Stabæk and Aalesund were relegated from the 2023 Eliteserien, while Egersund, Levanger and Lyn were promoted from the 2023 Norwegian Second Division.

=== Stadiums and locations ===
Team	Location	County	Arena	Turf	Capacity
Aalesund	Ålesund	Møre og Romsdal	Color Line Stadion	Artificial	10,778
Bryne	Bryne	Rogaland	Bryne Stadion	Natural	4,000
Egersund	Egersund	Rogaland	Idrettsparken	Artificial	1,200
Kongsvinger	Kongsvinger	Innlandet	Gjemselund Stadion	Artificial	5,824
Levanger	Levanger	Trøndelag	TOBB Arena Levanger	Artificial	2,438
Lyn	Oslo	Oslo	Bislett Stadion (Note: Lyn played some home games at KFUM Arena, Nadderud and Ullevaal.)	Natural	15,400
Mjøndalen	Mjøndalen	Buskerud	Consto Arena	Artificial	4,200
Moss	Moss	Østfold	Melløs Stadion	Natural	2,373
Ranheim	Trondheim	Trøndelag	EXTRA Arena	Artificial	3,000
Raufoss	Raufoss	Innlandet	NAMMO Stadion	Artificial	3,042
Sandnes Ulf	Sandnes	Rogaland	Øster Hus Arena	Artificial	6,043
Sogndal	Sogndalsfjøra	Vestland	Fosshaugane Campus	Artificial	5,622
Stabæk	Bærum	Akershus	Nadderud Stadion	Artificial	4,938
Start	Kristiansand	Agder	Sparebanken Sør Arena	Artificial	14,448
Vålerenga	Oslo	Oslo	Intility Arena	Artificial	16,556
Åsane	Bergen	Vestland	Åsane Arena	Artificial	3,300

=== Personnel and kits ===
Team	Manager	Kit manufacturer	Shirt sponsor
Aalesund	(Norway) Kjetil Rekdal	Umbro	Sparebanken Møre
Bryne	(Norway) Kevin Knappen	Umbro	Sparebanken Sør
Egersund	(Norway) Kjell André Thu	Macron	Sparebanken Vest
Kongsvinger	(Sweden) Johan Wennberg	Umbro	Mapei
Levanger	(Norway) Per Verner Rønning	Macron	Induform
Lyn	(Norway) Jan Halvor Halvorsen	Hummel	OBOS
Mjøndalen	(Scotland) Kevin Nicol	Umbro	Sparebanken Øst
Moss	(Norway) Thomas Myhre	Select	SpareBank 1 Østfold Akershus
Ranheim	(Norway) Kåre Ingebrigtsen	Umbro	SpareBank 1 SMN
Raufoss	(Sweden) Jörgen Wålemark	Puma	Nammo
Sandnes Ulf	(Norway) Steinar Nilsen	Hummel	Øster Hus
Sogndal	(Norway) Morten Kalvenes	Umbro	Sparebanken Vest
Stabæk	(Norway) Bjørn Helge Riise	Nike	SpareBank 1 Østlandet
Start	(Norway) Azar Karadas	Macron	Sparebanken Sør
Vålerenga	(Norway) Geir Bakke	Adidas	OBOS
Åsane	(Norway) Eirik Bakke	Craft	Tertnes Holding

=== Managerial changes ===
Team	Outgoing manager	Manner of departure	Date of vacancy	Position in the table	Incoming manager	Date of appointment
Kongsvinger	(Norway) Magnus Erga (Sweden) Johan Wennberg (caretakers)	End of caretaker spell	23 December 2023	Pre-season	(Sweden) Johan Wennberg	23 December 2023
Sandnes Ulf	(Norway) Bjarne Berntsen	End of contract	31 December 2023	Pre-season	(Norway) Thomas Pereira	1 January 2024
Start	(Norway) Sindre Tjelmeland	Mutual consent	9 January 2024	Pre-season	(Norway) Azar Karadas	8 February 2024
Aalesund	(Norway) Christian Johnsen	Sacked	18 June 2024	16th	(Norway) Sindre Eid (caretaker)	18 June 2024
Aalesund	(Norway) Sindre Eid (caretaker)	End of caretaker spell	30 June 2024	15th	(Norway) Kjetil Rekdal	30 June 2024
Åsane	(Norway) Morten Røssland	Mutual consent	30 July 2024	13th	(Norway) Eirik Bakke	30 July 2024
Sandnes Ulf	(Norway) Thomas Pereira	Mutual consent	5 August 2024	16th	(Norway) Arturo Cleveland (caretaker)	5 August 2024
Sandnes Ulf	(Norway) Arturo Cleveland (caretaker)	End of caretaker spell	11 August 2024	16th	(Norway) Steinar Nilsen	11 August 2024
Stabæk	(United States) Bob Bradley	Mutual consent	22 September 2024	7th	(Norway) Bjørn Helge Riise	22 September 2024
Sogndal	(Norway) Tore André Flo	Mutual consent	30 September 2024	10th	(Norway) Morten Kalvenes	1 October 2024

== League table ==
Pos	Team	Pld	W	D	L	GF	GA	GD	Pts	Promotion, qualification or relegation
1	Vålerenga (C, P)	30	21	6	3	82	31	+51	69	Promotion to Eliteserien
2	Bryne (P)	30	18	4	8	50	29	+21	58	Promotion to Eliteserien
3	Moss	30	16	5	9	54	41	+13	53	Qualification for the promotion play-offs
4	Egersund	30	14	5	11	57	56	+1	47	Qualification for the promotion play-offs
5	Lyn	30	12	10	8	56	40	+16	46	Qualification for the promotion play-offs
6	Kongsvinger	30	11	11	8	47	50	−3	44	Qualification for the promotion play-offs
7	Stabæk	30	12	6	12	57	59	−2	42	
8	Raufoss	30	11	8	11	34	35	−1	41	
9	Aalesund	30	12	4	14	45	49	−4	40	
10	Ranheim	30	10	9	11	48	46	+2	39	
11	Åsane	30	10	7	13	46	52	−6	37	
12	Start	30	9	8	13	45	57	−12	35	
13	Sogndal	30	9	7	14	34	40	−6	34	
14	Mjøndalen (Note: Mjøndalen were deducted 1 point.) (O)	30	8	8	14	38	50	−12	31	Qualification for the relegation play-offs
15	Levanger (R)	30	6	11	13	47	51	−4	29	Relegation to Second Division
16	Sandnes Ulf (R)	30	4	5	21	26	80	−54	17	Relegation to Second Division

Source: OBOS-ligaen (in Norwegian)
Rules for classification: 1) Points; 2) Goal difference; 3) Goals scored; 4) Head-to-head points; 5) Head-to-head goal difference; 6) Head-to-head goals scored.
(C) Champions; (O) Play-off winners; (P) Promoted; (R) Relegated

== Positions by round ==
Team ╲ Round	1	2	3	4	5	6	7	8	9	10	11	12	13	14	15	16	17	18	19	20	21	22	23	24	25	26	27	28	29	30
Vålerenga	7	5	8	9	11	7	6	8	7	4	3	2	2	1	1	1	1	1	1	1	1	1	1	1	1	1	1	1	1	1
Bryne	2	9	11	6	4	6	4	5	5	3	6	5	6	6	3	4	3	2	2	2	2	2	2	2	2	2	2	2	2	2
Moss	1	10	4	7	8	10	10	7	8	5	4	6	4	3	2	2	2	4	3	4	3	3	3	3	3	3	3	3	3	3
Egersund	3	1	3	2	1	2	1	1	1	1	2	4	3	2	5	3	5	3	5	3	4	4	5	5	4	4	6	5	5	4
Lyn	16	13	7	8	7	8	7	6	6	8	8	7	9	9	8	8	6	7	7	8	7	5	4	4	5	5	4	4	4	5
Kongsvinger	4	5	6	4	2	3	5	4	2	2	1	1	1	5	6	7	7	8	8	6	6	7	8	7	7	7	8	8	8	6
Stabæk	7	7	2	1	2	1	2	2	4	7	5	3	5	4	4	6	8	6	4	5	5	6	7	8	8	8	5	6	6	7
Raufoss	11	11	15	16	13	8	9	12	11	9	9	10	10	10	11	11	11	11	9	9	9	8	6	6	6	6	7	7	7	8
Aalesund	7	3	8	12	15	14	15	16	16	15	16	15	15	15	15	15	14	12	13	14	15	13	13	14	14	13	12	10	10	9
Ranheim	14	8	10	10	9	11	12	13	10	11	11	11	11	11	9	10	9	10	11	10	11	10	10	9	9	9	9	9	9	10
Åsane	5	11	13	13	12	15	11	14	14	16	13	13	13	13	13	13	12	13	12	12	12	12	11	11	12	12	13	13	13	11
Start	15	16	16	14	16	16	16	15	15	12	12	14	14	14	14	14	13	14	15	15	14	15	14	12	11	10	10	11	11	12
Sogndal	7	3	5	3	6	5	3	3	3	6	7	8	7	7	7	5	4	5	6	7	8	9	9	10	10	11	11	12	12	13
Mjøndalen	12	14	14	15	14	13	14	11	13	14	14	12	12	12	12	12	15	15	14	13	13	14	15	15	15	15	15	15	15	14
Levanger	5	2	1	5	5	4	8	9	9	10	10	9	8	8	10	9	10	9	10	11	10	11	12	13	13	14	14	14	14	15
Sandnes Ulf	13	15	12	11	10	12	13	10	12	13	15	16	16	16	16	16	16	16	16	16	16	16	16	16	16	16	16	16	16	16

Promotion to 2025 Eliteserien
Promotion play-offs
Relegation play-offs
Relegation to 2025 2. divisjon

Source: nifs.no

== Results ==
Home \ Away	AAL	BRY	EGE	KON	LEV	LYN	MJØ	MOS	RAN	RAU	SAN	SOG	STB	STR	VÅL	ÅSA
Aalesund	—	1–2	2–3	4–4	4–3	0–3	0–1	1–0	1–2	1–4	2–0	0–2	1–1	3–1	0–2	4–1
Bryne	2–0	—	2–1	1–1	0–1	5–3	1–0	3–0	3–2	1–0	1–1	1–0	3–0	3–1	1–1	1–0
Egersund	3–1	0–2	—	0–1	2–2	1–1	3–1	3–2	0–2	1–2	3–1	0–2	2–1	3–2	1–1	1–0
Kongsvinger	1–5	3–1	3–3	—	3–3	1–1	3–2	0–0	2–1	1–1	1–0	0–1	1–3	3–0	2–2	0–5
Levanger	4–0	0–1	2–1	1–2	—	1–3	1–1	5–0	2–2	0–1	4–0	0–0	1–2	1–1	1–4	2–3
Lyn	0–0	1–0	2–1	1–1	3–1	—	1–1	1–2	1–1	1–2	5–0	1–2	7–1	2–2	1–1	3–1
Mjøndalen	1–1	1–1	0–3	1–2	2–0	1–2	—	1–2	3–3	1–1	0–1	0–0	3–0	1–1	5–3	2–1
Moss	1–0	1–0	1–2	1–0	5–1	3–0	1–0	—	2–1	3–2	6–1	3–0	3–3	2–1	0–2	1–1
Ranheim	0–1	1–4	1–3	2–2	1–1	1–1	0–1	1–0	—	1–0	3–1	3–0	3–0	2–3	1–3	2–2
Raufoss	0–2	0–1	4–1	1–1	0–3	1–0	0–1	0–2	1–1	—	1–1	4–1	0–0	2–1	1–2	1–0
Sandnes Ulf	0–2	2–1	3–4	0–2	2–2	0–1	2–3	3–3	2–6	2–0	—	1–0	1–3	0–4	0–2	0–3
Sogndal	0–1	2–3	2–2	2–0	1–1	0–1	3–1	1–0	0–2	1–1	5–1	—	2–3	4–0	0–3	0–2
Stabæk	1–4	1–0	4–5	5–0	1–0	2–2	4–2	1–4	3–0	1–2	3–0	2–0	—	2–3	1–2	1–1
Start	1–3	2–1	4–3	1–4	1–1	1–4	1–0	1–1	0–0	1–2	1–1	2–1	4–3	—	1–2	3–1
Vålerenga	4–1	1–0	4–0	0–2	3–1	4–2	4–2	5–1	3–1	3–0	8–0	1–1	1–3	1–1	—	5–0
Åsane	2–0	2–5	1–2	2–1	2–2	3–2	5–0	1–4	1–2	0–0	1–0	1–1	2–2	1–0	1–5	—

Source: OBOS-ligaen (in Norwegian)
Legend: Blue = home team win; Yellow = draw; Red = away team win.

== Play-offs ==
=== Promotion play-offs ===
The teams from third to sixth place will take part in the promotion play-offs; these are single leg knockout matches. In the first round, the fifth-placed team will play at home against the sixth-placed team. The winner of the first round will meet the fourth-placed team on away ground in the second round. The winner of the second round will meet the third-placed team on away ground. The winner of the third round will face the 14th-placed team in the Eliteserien over two legs in the Eliteserien play-offs for a spot in the top-flight next season.

First round
5	Lyn	1
6	Kongsvinger (a.e.t.)	2

Second round
4	Egersund	1
6	Kongsvinger	2

Third round
3	Moss	3
6	Kongsvinger	2

First round

17 November 2024
14:00 CET

Lyn	1–2 (a.e.t.)	Kongsvinger
Þorkelsson 38' (o.g.)	Report	Lysgård 85'; Kapskarmo 100'

KFUM Arena, Oslo
Attendance: 2,509
Referee: Marius Lien

Second round

23 November 2024
14:00 CET

Egersund	1–2	Kongsvinger
Sleveland 17'	Report	Grundt 7', 22'

Idrettsparken, Egersund
Attendance: 1,190
Referee: Jan Morten Tennøy

Third round

1 December 2024
14:00 CET

Moss	3–2	Kongsvinger
Grundt 7' (o.g.); Pedersen 46'; Holmé 56' (o.g.)	Report	Haren 52' (pen.), 65'

Melløs Stadion, Moss
Attendance: 3,709
Referee: Marius Hansen Grøtta

=== Relegation play-offs ===
The 14th-placed team will take part in a two-legged play-off against the winners of the Second Division play-offs, to decide who will play in the First Division next season.

Semifinal
2	Jerv	1	2	3
3	Tromsdalen	0	1	1

Final
1	Mjøndalen	2	3	5
2	Jerv	1	1	2

24 November 2024
18:00 CET

Mjøndalen	2–1	Jerv
Bringaker 77'; Solberg 90+5'	Report	Furaha 31'

Consto Arena, Mjøndalen
Attendance: 1,422
Referee: Stian Røvig Sletner
30 November 2024
17:00 CET

Jerv	1–3	Mjøndalen
Furaha 64'	Report	Conteh 34'; Bringaker 49'; Brenden 72'

Levermyr Stadion, Grimstad
Attendance: 2,012
Referee: Mischa Huru Kellerhals

== Season statistics ==
=== Top scorers ===
Rank	Player	Club(s)	Goals
1	(China) John Hou Sæter	Ranheim	19
2	(Norway) Sanel Bojadzic	Levanger, Bryne	16
2	(Mali) Bassekou Diabaté	Stabæk	16
4	(Norway) Andreas Helmersen	Egersund	13
4	(Norway) Jones El-Abdellaoui	Vålerenga	13
4	(Netherlands) Mees Rijks	Vålerenga	13
7	(Denmark) Muamer Brajanac	Vålerenga	11
7	(Norway) Bendik Bye	Ranheim	11
7	(Denmark) Lucas Haren	Kongsvinger	11
7	(Portugal) Duarte Moreira	Bryne	11
7	(Norway) Anders Bjørntvedt Olsen	Lyn	11
7	(Norway) Sebastian Pedersen	Moss	11
7	(Norway) Oskar Spiten-Nysæter	Stabæk	11

=== Hat-tricks ===
Player	For	Against	Result	Date
(Norway) Bendik Bye	Ranheim	Sandnes Ulf	3–1 (H)	6 April 2024
(Sierra Leone) Alie Conteh	Mjøndalen	Vålerenga	5–3 (H)	28 April 2024
(Norway) Andreas Helmersen	Egersund	Start	3–4 (A)	16 May 2024
(Norway) Mathias Johansen	Lyn	Start	4–1 (A)	9 June 2024
(Netherlands) Mees Rijks^{4}	Vålerenga	Sandnes Ulf	8–0 (H)	23 June 2024
(Denmark) Muamer Brajanac	Vålerenga	Levanger	4–1 (A)	18 August 2024
(Norway) Sebastian Haugland	Åsane	Lyn	3–2 (H)	2 November 2024

Note: ^{4} – player scored 4 goals

=== Clean sheets ===
Rank	Player	Club	Clean sheets
1	(Norway) Magnus Sjøeng	Vålerenga	9
2	(Norway) Mathias Eriksen Ranmark	Moss	8
2	(Norway) Lars Jendal	Sogndal	8
4	(Norway) Sondre Rossbach	Stabæk	7
4	(Norway) Simen Vidtun Nilsen	Ranheim	7
6	(Norway) Alexander Hurlen Pedersen	Lyn	6
6	(Norway) Thomas Kinn	Mjøndalen	6
6	(Norway) Tor Erik Larsen	Aalesund	6
6	(Norway) Simen Lillevik Kjellevold	Åsane	6
6	(Norway) Morten Sætra	Levanger	6

=== Discipline ===
==== Player ====
- Most yellow cards: 8
  - (Norway) Andreas Dybevik (Bryne, Kongsvinger)
  - (Sweden) Victor Fors (Raufoss)
  - (Ghana) Jamal Deen Haruna (Raufoss)
  - (Norway) Christian Landu Landu (Bryne)
  - (Norway) Erik Tønne (Ranheim)
- Most red cards: 2
  - (Norway) Sander Kilen (Aalesund)

==== Club ====
- Most yellow cards: 66
  - Raufoss
- Fewest yellow cards: 35
  - Lyn
  - Vålerenga
- Most red cards: 4
  - Mjøndalen
- Fewest red cards: 0
  - Bryne
  - Lyn
  - Moss
  - Stabæk

== Awards ==
=== Monthly awards ===
Month	Coach of the Month		Player of the Month		Young Player of the Month		References
Month	Coach	Club	Player	Club	Player	Club	References
April	(Norway) Kjell André Thu	Egersund	(Norway) Sanel Bojadzic	Levanger	(Norway) Sebastian Olderheim	Stabæk	
May	(Norway) Thomas Myhre	Moss	(Norway) Andreas Helmersen	Egersund	(Norway) Oskar Spiten-Nysæter	Stabæk	
June	(Norway) Geir Bakke	Vålerenga	(Norway) Oskar Spiten-Nysæter	Stabæk	(Norway) Oskar Spiten-Nysæter	Stabæk	
August	(Norway) Kevin Knappen	Bryne	(Denmark) Muamer Brajanac	Vålerenga	(Norway) Sjur Jonassen	Bryne	
September	(Sweden) Jörgen Wålemark	Raufoss	(China) Hou Yongyong	Ranheim	(Nigeria) Mustapha Isah	Start	
October	(Norway) Kjetil Rekdal	Aalesund	(Denmark) Mads Nielsen	Aalesund	(Norway) Jacob Hanstad	Lyn	

=== Annual awards ===
Award	Winner	Club
Coach of the Season	(Norway) Kevin Knappen	Bryne
Player of the Season	(China) Hou Yongyong	Ranheim
Young Player of the Season	(Norway) Jones El-Abdellaoui	Vålerenga

== League attendances ==
Pos	Team	Total	High	Low	Average	Change
1	Vålerenga	136,402	16,556	6,711	9,093	−13.7%^{1}
2	Aalesund	57,299	5,412	2,944	3,820	−26.6%^{1}
3	Lyn	55,425	24,003	1,134	3,695	+170.9%^{2}
4	Start	48,098	6,906	2,024	3,207	−28.5%
5	Stabæk	39,610	5,026	2,008	2,641	−22.2%^{1}
6	Sandnes Ulf	31,295	4,432	512	2,086	+8.8%
7	Sogndal	31,226	4,567	1,667	2,082	+16.8%
8	Kongsvinger	28,013	4,133	1,275	1,868	+0.5%
9	Moss	27,922	3,200	1,313	1,861	+8.2%
10	Bryne	27,867	4,750	1,115	1,858	+56.1%
11	Mjøndalen	22,863	2,368	1,206	1,524	+22.0%
12	Ranheim	19,377	2,200	1,008	1,292	+7.7%
13	Levanger	18,478	2,188	308	1,232	+104.0%^{2}
14	Raufoss	15,571	3,042	715	1,038	+23.6%
15	Egersund	15,377	1,613	720	1,025	+79.2%^{2}
16	Åsane	10,899	1,660	449	727	+8.8%
	League total	585,722	24,003	308	2,441	+31.9%

Notes:
1: Team played last season in Eliteserien.
2: Team played last season in 2. divisjon.
