= List of Norwegian football transfers summer 2024 =

This is a list of Norwegian football transfers in the 2024 summer transfer window by club. Only clubs of the 2024 Eliteserien and 2024 1. divisjon are included.

== Eliteserien ==
=== Bodø/Glimt ===
In: Note: Flags indicate national team as defined under FIFA eligibility rules; some limited exceptions apply. Players may hold more than one non-FIFA nationality.

No.	Pos.	Nation	Player
8	MF	NOR	Sondre Auklend (from Viking)
17	FW	SWE	Samuel Burakovsky (from (Sweden) Landskrona)
21	FW	NOR	Andreas Helmersen (from Egersund)
25	MF	NOR	Isak Dybvik Määttä (from (Netherlands) Groningen)
29	DF	SVK	Michal Tomič (on loan from (Czech Republic) Slavia Prague)
77	FW	DEN	Philip Zinckernagel (on loan from (Belgium) Club Brugge)
—	FW	NGR	Gift Sunday (from (Nigeria) P Sports Academy)

Out: Note: Flags indicate national team as defined under FIFA eligibility rules; some limited exceptions apply. Players may hold more than one non-FIFA nationality.

No.	Pos.	Nation	Player
8	MF	DEN	Albert Grønbæk (to (France) Rennes)
21	DF	CZE	Lucas Kubr (to (Czech Republic) Zbrojovka Brno)
22	FW	NOR	Petter Nosakhare Dahl (to (Belgium) Mechelen, previously on loan at KFUM)
24	GK	NOR	Kjetil Haug (loan return to (France) Toulouse)
28	FW	NOR	Oscar Kapskarmo (on loan to Kongsvinger)

=== Brann ===
In: Note: Flags indicate national team as defined under FIFA eligibility rules; some limited exceptions apply. Players may hold more than one non-FIFA nationality.

No.	Pos.	Nation	Player
5	MF	NOR	Sakarias Opsahl (from Tromsø)
32	MF	NOR	Markus Haaland (promoted from junior squad)
43	DF	NOR	Rasmus Holten (loan return from Mjøndalen)

Out: Note: Flags indicate national team as defined under FIFA eligibility rules; some limited exceptions apply. Players may hold more than one non-FIFA nationality.

No.	Pos.	Nation	Player
7	FW	DEN	Magnus Warming (to (Denmark) Lyngby)
19	MF	NOR	Sivert Heltne Nilsen (to (Scotland) Aberdeen)

=== Fredrikstad ===
In: Note: Flags indicate national team as defined under FIFA eligibility rules; some limited exceptions apply. Players may hold more than one non-FIFA nationality.

No.	Pos.	Nation	Player
1	GK	NOR	Håvar Jenssen (loan return from Tromsø)
15	DF	SEN	Fallou Fall (on loan from (France) Reims)
16	DF	NOR	Daniel Eid (from (Sweden) Norrköping)
23	FW	NOR	Henrik Skogvold (from Lillestrøm)
24	DF	NOR	Torjus Engebakken (from Raufoss)
28	DF	NOR	Imre Bech Hermansen (loan return from Bryne)
31	MF	NOR	Elias Solberg (promoted from junior squad)
32	DF	NOR	Jesper Solberg (promoted from junior squad)
44	MF	NGR	Samson Tijani (on loan from (Austria) Red Bull Salzburg)

Out: Note: Flags indicate national team as defined under FIFA eligibility rules; some limited exceptions apply. Players may hold more than one non-FIFA nationality.

No.	Pos.	Nation	Player
1	GK	NOR	Håvar Jenssen (on loan to Tromsø)
2	DF	SWE	Tim Björkström (on loan to Moss)
18	DF	NOR	Ludvig Begby (on loan to Start)
21	DF	NOR	Oscar Kjøge Jansson (to Strømmen)
23	MF	NOR	Erlend Segberg (to Kristiansund)
26	DF	DEN	Mads Nielsen (on loan to Aalesund)
33	MF	NOR	Filip Stensland (to Skeid)

=== HamKam ===
In: Note: Flags indicate national team as defined under FIFA eligibility rules; some limited exceptions apply. Players may hold more than one non-FIFA nationality.

No.	Pos.	Nation	Player
5	DF	SWE	Anton Ekeroth (from (Denmark) Horsens)
8	MF	NOR	Markus Johnsgård (on loan from Tromsø)
25	MF	NOR	Jonas Dobloug Rasen (loan return from Gjøvik-Lyn)
27	MF	NOR	Leo Haug Utkilen (promoted from junior squad)
77	MF	NOR	Mohamed Ofkir (on loan from Vålerenga)

Out: Note: Flags indicate national team as defined under FIFA eligibility rules; some limited exceptions apply. Players may hold more than one non-FIFA nationality.

No.	Pos.	Nation	Player
3	DF	USA	Sam Rogers (loan return to Lillestrøm)
8	MF	DEN	Oliver Kjærgaard (to (Denmark) Horsens)
17	MF	NOR	Niklas Ødegård (loan return to Molde)
20	FW	NOR	Julian Gonstad (on loan to Eidsvold Turn)
25	MF	NOR	Jonas Dobloug Rasen (on loan to Gjøvik-Lyn)

=== Haugesund ===
In: Note: Flags indicate national team as defined under FIFA eligibility rules; some limited exceptions apply. Players may hold more than one non-FIFA nationality.

No.	Pos.	Nation	Player
5	DF	DEN	Mikkel Fischer (from (Denmark) Midtjylland)
10	MF	NOR	Emir Derviskadic (loan return from Sandnes Ulf)
36	DF	NOR	Eivind Helgeland (loan return from Mjøndalen)
38	DF	NOR	Vegard Solheim (loan return from Sandnes Ulf)
41	DF	NOR	Mathias Bakken Myklebust (promoted from junior squad)
55	DF	SEN	Madiodio Dia (loan return from Egersund)
77	MF	BDI	Parfait Bizoza (from (Denmark) Lyngby)

Out: Note: Flags indicate national team as defined under FIFA eligibility rules; some limited exceptions apply. Players may hold more than one non-FIFA nationality.

No.	Pos.	Nation	Player
5	DF	ISL	Hlynur Freyr Karlsson (to (Sweden) Brommapojkarna)
10	MF	NOR	Emir Derviskadic (on loan to Sandnes Ulf)
17	FW	KOR	Seo Jong-min (released)
38	DF	NOR	Vegard Solheim (on loan to Sandnes Ulf)

=== KFUM ===
In: Note: Flags indicate national team as defined under FIFA eligibility rules; some limited exceptions apply. Players may hold more than one non-FIFA nationality.

No.	Pos.	Nation	Player
22	DF	GAM	Dadi Gaye (on loan from Tromsø)
35	GK	NOR	Idar Nordby Lysgård (free transfer)
99	FW	NOR	Adama Diomande (free transfer)

Out: Note: Flags indicate national team as defined under FIFA eligibility rules; some limited exceptions apply. Players may hold more than one non-FIFA nationality.

No.	Pos.	Nation	Player
19	FW	NOR	Niclas Schjøth Semmen (on loan to Mjøndalen)
22	FW	NOR	Petter Nosakhare Dahl (loan return to Bodø/Glimt)
23	DF	NOR	Mohammed Hopsdal Abbas (on loan to Strømmen)
29	DF	NOR	Kristoffer Lassen Harrison (on loan to Moss)
30	MF	NOR	Adnan Hadzic (on loan to Raufoss)

=== Kristiansund ===
In: Note: Flags indicate national team as defined under FIFA eligibility rules; some limited exceptions apply. Players may hold more than one non-FIFA nationality.

No.	Pos.	Nation	Player
7	MF	NOR	Erlend Segberg (from Fredrikstad)
13	FW	SEN	Alioune Ndour (on loan from (Belgium) Zulte Waregem)
16	FW	NOR	David Tufekcic (on loan from Brann 2, then made permanent)
17	FW	NOR	Kristian Lien (on loan from (Netherlands) Groningen)
21	DF	SRB	Igor Jeličić (from (Serbia) Vojvodina)
25	GK	NOR	Marius Rød (from Hødd)
27	FW	NOR	Adrian Kurd Rønning (from Vålerenga)

Out: Note: Flags indicate national team as defined under FIFA eligibility rules; some limited exceptions apply. Players may hold more than one non-FIFA nationality.

No.	Pos.	Nation	Player
7	FW	SEN	Pape Habib Guèye (loan return to (Scotland) Aberdeen)
17	FW	ISL	Brynjólfur Willumsson (to (Netherlands) Groningen)
18	DF	NOR	Sebastian Jarl (to Vålerenga)
23	MF	NOR	Heine Gikling Bruseth (to (United States) Orlando City)
24	FW	NOR	Awet Alemseged (on loan to Levanger, previously on loan at Arendal)
30	GK	SEN	Serigne Mor Mbaye (on loan to Sandnes Ulf)

=== Lillestrøm ===
In: Note: Flags indicate national team as defined under FIFA eligibility rules; some limited exceptions apply. Players may hold more than one non-FIFA nationality.

No.	Pos.	Nation	Player
5	DF	IRQ	Mohanad Jeahze (from (United States) DC United)
9	FW	SWE	Jabir Abdihakim Ali (on loan from (Sweden) Västerås)
20	FW	ANG	Felix Vá (from (Sweden) Djurgården, previously on loan)
21	MF	NOR	Markus Karlsbakk (from Aalesund)
29	GK	NOR	Jørgen Sveinhaug (loan return from Strømmen)
31	GK	NOR	Oliver Petersen (on loan from Molde)
33	FW	SEN	Moctar Diop (from Aalesund)
37	MF	NOR	Leandro Neto (promoted from junior squad)
38	FW	NOR	Alexander Røssing-Lelesiit (promoted from junior squad)
43	FW	NOR	Markus Wæhler (promoted from junior squad)
55	MF	NOR	Kevin Krygård (from (Portugal) Casa Pia)
77	DF	NOR	Lucas Svenningsen (from Ull/Kisa)

Out: Note: Flags indicate national team as defined under FIFA eligibility rules; some limited exceptions apply. Players may hold more than one non-FIFA nationality.

No.	Pos.	Nation	Player
5	DF	USA	Sam Rogers (on loan to Aalesund, previously on loan at Hamkam)
21	FW	NOR	Daniel Skaarud (to (Netherlands) Jong Ajax)
24	MF	NGR	Efe Lucky (on loan to Åsane)
27	MF	NOR	Uranik Seferi (on loan to Hødd)
33	FW	NOR	Henrik Skogvold (to Fredrikstad)
90	MF	NOR	El Schaddai Furaha (on loan to Raufoss)

=== Molde ===
In: Note: Flags indicate national team as defined under FIFA eligibility rules; some limited exceptions apply. Players may hold more than one non-FIFA nationality.

No.	Pos.	Nation	Player
9	FW	DEN	Frederik Ihler (from (Sweden) Landskrona)
10	MF	DEN	Mads Enggård (from (Denmark) Randers)
27	FW	NOR	Ola Brynhildsen (on loan from (Denmark) Midtjylland)
32	GK	NOR	Peder Hoel Lervik (loan return from Eidsvold Turn)
33	MF	NOR	Niklas Ødegård (loan return from Hamkam)
34	GK	IRL	Sean McDermott (free transfer)

Out: Note: Flags indicate national team as defined under FIFA eligibility rules; some limited exceptions apply. Players may hold more than one non-FIFA nationality.

No.	Pos.	Nation	Player
1	GK	NOR	Jacob Karlstrøm (on loan to (Sweden) IFK Göteborg)
6	MF	NOR	Alwande Roaldsøy (on loan to Sandnes Ulf)
12	GK	NOR	Oliver Petersen (on loan to Lillestrøm)

=== Odd ===
In: Note: Flags indicate national team as defined under FIFA eligibility rules; some limited exceptions apply. Players may hold more than one non-FIFA nationality.

No.	Pos.	Nation	Player
14	DF	NOR	Sheriff Sinyan (from (Czech Republic) Slavia Praha)
20	FW	GHA	Abdulrazaq Ishaq (on loan from (Belgium) Anderlecht)
26	MF	SWE	Alexander Fransson (from (Cyprus) Omonia)
40	GK	NOR	Kjetil Haug (on loan from (France) Toulouse)
—		NGR	Abduljeleel Abdulateef (on loan from (Nigeria) Bison)

Out: Note: Flags indicate national team as defined under FIFA eligibility rules; some limited exceptions apply. Players may hold more than one non-FIFA nationality.

No.	Pos.	Nation	Player
11	FW	NOR	Faniel Tewelde (to (Belgium) Lommel)
15	DF	SRB	Mihajlo Ivančević (loan return to (Denmark) OB)
20	MF	NOR	Thomas Rekdal (on loan to Tromsdalen)
26	DF	NOR	Jesper Svenungsen Skau (on loan to Mjøndalen)

=== Rosenborg ===
In: Note: Flags indicate national team as defined under FIFA eligibility rules; some limited exceptions apply. Players may hold more than one non-FIFA nationality.

No.	Pos.	Nation	Player
4	DF	DEN	Luka Racic (from (Greece) Volos)
5	MF	PLE	Moustafa Zeidan (on loan from (Sweden) Malmö FF)
21	DF	SVK	Tomáš Nemčík (from (Slovakia) Žilina, previously on loan)
35	FW	NOR	Emil Ceïde (on loan from (Italy) Sassuolo)
46	FW	DEN	Noah Sahsah (on loan from (Denmark) FC Copenhagen)

Out: Note: Flags indicate national team as defined under FIFA eligibility rules; some limited exceptions apply. Players may hold more than one non-FIFA nationality.

No.	Pos.	Nation	Player
2	DF	NOR	Leo Cornic (to Tromsø)
8	MF	NOR	Tobias Børkeeiet (to (Austria) Rapid Wien)
11	FW	CAN	Jayden Nelson (on loan to (Germany) SSV Ulm 1846)
16	DF	NOR	Håkon Røsten (on loan to Ranheim, previously on loan at (Sweden) Oddevold, previously on loan at Ranheim)
22	FW	FIN	Agon Sadiku (to (Netherlands) Emmen)
40	FW	NOR	Pawel Chrupalla (on loan to Sarpsborg 08)

=== Sandefjord ===
In: Note: Flags indicate national team as defined under FIFA eligibility rules; some limited exceptions apply. Players may hold more than one non-FIFA nationality.

No.	Pos.	Nation	Player
5	DF	NOR	Aleksander van der Spa (from Bodø/Glimt 2)
14	MF	NOR	Edvard Sundbø Pettersen (from (Denmark) Midtjylland U19)
23	FW	ISL	Stefán Ingi Sigurðarson (from (Belgium) Patro Eisden)
28	DF	NOR	Theodor Martin Agelin (from Grorud)
43	FW	SWE	Elias Jemal (from (Sweden) Vasalund)

Out: Note: Flags indicate national team as defined under FIFA eligibility rules; some limited exceptions apply. Players may hold more than one non-FIFA nationality.

No.	Pos.	Nation	Player
5	DF	NOR	Andreas van der Spa (retired)
14	MF	IRQ	Danilo Al-Saed (to (Netherlands) Heerenveen)
24	MF	NOR	Sebastian Holm Mathisen (on loan to Eik Tønsberg)

=== Sarpsborg 08 ===
In: Note: Flags indicate national team as defined under FIFA eligibility rules; some limited exceptions apply. Players may hold more than one non-FIFA nationality.

No.	Pos.	Nation	Player
2	DF	NED	Menno Koch (from (Bulgaria) CSKA Sofia)
4	DF	NOR	Nikolai Skuseth (from Ranheim)
7	FW	GAM	Alagie Sanyang (from Start)
8	MF	NOR	Harald Nilsen Tangen (from Viking)
13	GK	FIN	Carljohan Eriksson (from (Denmark) Nordsjælland)
16	FW	DEN	Frederik Carstensen (from (Denmark) Silkeborg)
18	MF	NOR	Håvard Huser Åsheim (free transfer)
19	FW	ISL	Sveinn Aron Guðjohnsen (from (Germany) Hansa Rostock)
25	MF	NOR	Jesper Gregersen (from Start)
26	FW	NGR	Daniel Job (from (Nigeria) Future Pro, previously on loan)
29	FW	NOR	Martin Håheim-Elveseter (from Hødd)
31	MF	SEN	Amidou Diop (on loan from Aalesund)
37	FW	NOR	Pawel Chrupalla (on loan from Rosenborg)
81	MF	NOR	Mathias Svenningsen-Grønn (promoted from junior squad)
83	DF	NOR	Adam Kaszuba (promoted from junior squad)

Out: Note: Flags indicate national team as defined under FIFA eligibility rules; some limited exceptions apply. Players may hold more than one non-FIFA nationality.

No.	Pos.	Nation	Player
3	DF	DEN	Anton Skipper (to (Denmark) Esbjerg)
4	DF	ESP	Arnau Casas (to (Netherlands) Cambuur)
7	FW	NOR	Martin Hoel Andersen (to (Sweden) Öster)
8	MF	DEN	Jeppe Andersen (to (Denmark) Silkeborg)
12	GK	NOR	Jarik Sundling (on loan to Moss, previously on loan at Kvik Halden)
18	MF	GAB	Serge-Junior Martinsson Ngouali (to (Sweden) Brommapojkarna)
19	FW	DEN	Henrik Meister (to (France) Rennes)
31	GK	SRB	Marko Ilić (loan return to (United States) Colorado Rapids)
74	FW	NOR	Aridon Racaj (to Fredrikstad 2)
77	DF	NOR	Markus Olsvik Welinder (on loan to Mjøndalen, then made permanent)
–	MF	NOR	Jakob Auby (on loan to Ørn Horten, previously on loan at Kvik Halden)

=== Strømsgodset ===
In: Note: Flags indicate national team as defined under FIFA eligibility rules; some limited exceptions apply. Players may hold more than one non-FIFA nationality.

No.	Pos.	Nation	Player
7	FW	SWE	Nikolaj Möller (on loan from (Switzerland) St. Gallen)
12	GK	NOR	Simo Lampinen-Skaug (loan return from Eidsvold Turn)

Out: Note: Flags indicate national team as defined under FIFA eligibility rules; some limited exceptions apply. Players may hold more than one non-FIFA nationality.

No.	Pos.	Nation	Player
3	DF	NOR	Sondre Fosnæss Hanssen (to Levanger)
12	GK	NOR	Simo Lampinen-Skaug (on loan to Eidsvold Turn)
15	MF	NOR	Andreas Heredia-Randen (on loan to Mjøndalen)
16	DF	GAM	Dadi Gaye (loan return to Tromsø)
18	DF	GHA	Ernest Boahene (released)
30	DF	NOR	Fabian Holst-Larsen (on loan to Alta, then to Mjøndalen)
68	DF	NOR	Yves Vaage (to (United States) SMU Mustangs)

=== Tromsø ===
In: Note: Flags indicate national team as defined under FIFA eligibility rules; some limited exceptions apply. Players may hold more than one non-FIFA nationality.

No.	Pos.	Nation	Player
2	DF	NOR	Leo Cornic (from Rosenborg)
19	MF	NOR	Heine Åsen Larsen (from Egersund)
20	MF	SWE	David Edvardsson (from (Sweden) Malmö)
22	FW	DEN	Frederik Christensen (from (Denmark) Hobro)
29	FW	NOR	Sean Nilsen-Modebe (from Ull/Kisa)
30	DF	NOR	Isak Vådebu (loan return from Levanger)
33	GK	NOR	Håvar Jenssen (on loan from Fredrikstad)
–	DF	NOR	Oskar Opsahl (loan return from Egersund)

Out: Note: Flags indicate national team as defined under FIFA eligibility rules; some limited exceptions apply. Players may hold more than one non-FIFA nationality.

No.	Pos.	Nation	Player
3	DF	NOR	Jesper Robertsen (on loan to Sogndal)
7	MF	DEN	Felix Winther (to (Denmark) Fredericia)
18	MF	NOR	Markus Johnsgård (on loan to HamKam)
22	MF	NOR	Sakarias Opsahl (to Brann)
26	DF	NOR	Isak Vik (on loan to Bryne, later on loan to Tromsdalen)
27	FW	SEN	Yoro Ba (on loan to Sogndal)
30	DF	NOR	Isak Vådebu (on loan to Levanger)
33	GK	NOR	Håvar Jenssen (loan return to Fredrikstad)
—	DF	GAM	Dadi Gaye (on loan to KFUM, previously on loan at Strømsgodset)

=== Viking ===
In: Note: Flags indicate national team as defined under FIFA eligibility rules; some limited exceptions apply. Players may hold more than one non-FIFA nationality.

No.	Pos.	Nation	Player
13	MF	SWE	Hampus Finndell (from (Sweden) Djurgården)
15	DF	NOR	Henrik Heggheim (from (Denmark) Brøndby)
27	MF	USA	Christian Cappis (from (Denmark) Brøndby)
31	MF	NOR	Niklas Fuglestad (promoted from junior squad)
51	GK	NOR	Aksel Bergsvik (promoted from junior squad)

Out: Note: Flags indicate national team as defined under FIFA eligibility rules; some limited exceptions apply. Players may hold more than one non-FIFA nationality.

No.	Pos.	Nation	Player
14	MF	AUS	Patrick Yazbek (to (United States) Nashville)
19	MF	NOR	Sondre Auklend (to Bodø/Glimt)
21	MF	NOR	Harald Nilsen Tangen (to Sarpsborg 08)
30	GK	ISL	Patrik Gunnarsson (to (Belgium) Kortrijk)
34	DF	NOR	Kristoffer Forgaard Paulsen (on loan to Sogndal)

== 1. divisjon ==
=== Aalesund ===
In: Note: Flags indicate national team as defined under FIFA eligibility rules; some limited exceptions apply. Players may hold more than one non-FIFA nationality.

No.	Pos.	Nation	Player
2	DF	DEN	Mads Nielsen (on loan from Fredrikstad)
3	DF	CRO	Vinko Međimorec (on loan from (Croatia) Slaven Belupo)
13	GK	DEN	Andreas Gülstorff (on loan from (Denmark) Nordsjælland)
19	FW	DEN	Paul Ngongo (from (Denmark) Kolding)
22	MF	SWE	Marcus Rafferty (on loan from (Sweden) Hammarby)
44	DF	USA	Sam Rogers (on loan from Lillestrøm)
66	MF	DEN	Janus Rex Seehusen (from (Denmark) Køge)

Out: Note: Flags indicate national team as defined under FIFA eligibility rules; some limited exceptions apply. Players may hold more than one non-FIFA nationality.

No.	Pos.	Nation	Player
4	DF	NOR	Nikolai Hopland (on loan to (Netherlands) Heerenveen)
19	FW	GHA	Isaac Atanga (on loan to (Finland) Ilves)
21	MF	SEN	Amidou Diop (on loan to Sarpsborg 08)
22	MF	NOR	Markus Karlsbakk (to Lillestrøm)
27	FW	SEN	Moctar Diop (to Lillestrøm)
34	DF	NOR	Stian Aarønes Holte (on loan to Follo, previously on loan at Alta)

=== Bryne ===
In: Note: Flags indicate national team as defined under FIFA eligibility rules; some limited exceptions apply. Players may hold more than one non-FIFA nationality.

No.	Pos.	Nation	Player
7	MF	NOR	Mats Selmer Thornes (from Åsane)
8	FW	NOR	Sanel Bojadzic (from Levanger)
17	DF	NOR	Lasse Qvigstad (from Ranheim)
21	DF	NOR	Isak Vik (on loan from Tromsø)

Out: Note: Flags indicate national team as defined under FIFA eligibility rules; some limited exceptions apply. Players may hold more than one non-FIFA nationality.

No.	Pos.	Nation	Player
6	DF	FRO	Noah Mneney (on loan to (Faroe Islands) HB Tórshavn)
7	MF	NOR	Sigurd Grønli (on loan to Start)
8	MF	NOR	Andreas Dybevik (to Kongsvinger)
17	FW	NOR	Elias Ivesdal Årsvoll (to (United States) Charlotte 49ers)
19	DF	NOR	Imre Bech Hermansen (loan return to Fredrikstad)
21	DF	NOR	Isak Vik (loan return to Tromsø)

=== Egersund ===
In: Note: Flags indicate national team as defined under FIFA eligibility rules; some limited exceptions apply. Players may hold more than one non-FIFA nationality.

No.	Pos.	Nation	Player
5	DF	NOR	Keivan Ghaedamini (from Skeid)
7	FW	SWE	Jack Lahne (from (France) Amiens)
9	FW	NOR	Jørgen Galta (on loan from Viking 2)
16	MF	NOR	Sivert Strangstad (on loan from Jerv)
27	GK	NOR	Sander Lønning (from Sandnes Ulf)
91	DF	SWE	Sammi Davis (from (Italy) Lecce U21)
99	FW	NOR	Joacim Holtan (on loan from Kongsvinger)

Out: Note: Flags indicate national team as defined under FIFA eligibility rules; some limited exceptions apply. Players may hold more than one non-FIFA nationality.

No.	Pos.	Nation	Player
1	GK	NOR	Anders Klemensson (to Kongsvinger)
5	DF	NOR	Oskar Opsahl (loan return to Tromsø)
7	MF	NOR	Heine Åsen Larsen (to Tromsø)
9	FW	NOR	Magnus Lankhof Dahlby (to Stabæk)
20	FW	NOR	Andreas Helmersen (to Bodø/Glimt)
24	DF	SEN	Madiodio Dia (loan return to Haugesund)

=== Kongsvinger ===
In: Note: Flags indicate national team as defined under FIFA eligibility rules; some limited exceptions apply. Players may hold more than one non-FIFA nationality.

No.	Pos.	Nation	Player
26	MF	SWE	Wilhelm Ärlig (free transfer)
27	MF	NOR	Andreas Dybevik (from Bryne)
32	FW	NOR	Oscar Kapskarmo (on loan from Bodø/Glimt)
41	GK	NOR	Anders Klemensson (from Egersund)
43	FW	NOR	Albert Sandstad (promoted from junior squad)

Out: Note: Flags indicate national team as defined under FIFA eligibility rules; some limited exceptions apply. Players may hold more than one non-FIFA nationality.

No.	Pos.	Nation	Player
8	MF	NOR	Vegard Leikvoll Moberg (to Mjøndalen)
15	DF	NOR	Marius Aamodt Eriksen (to Arendal)
16	DF	NOR	Marius Trengereid (on loan to Jerv)
18	FW	NOR	Joacim Holtan (on loan to Egersund)
28	FW	NOR	Rasmus Opdal Christiansen (on loan to Arendal)
41	GK	NOR	Mads Edwin Lindegaard (released, previously on loan at Fu/Vo)

=== Levanger ===
In: Note: Flags indicate national team as defined under FIFA eligibility rules; some limited exceptions apply. Players may hold more than one non-FIFA nationality.

No.	Pos.	Nation	Player
15	DF	NOR	Sondre Fosnæss Hanssen (from Strømsgodset)
25	FW	NOR	Awet Alemseged (on loan from Kristiansund)
25	DF	NOR	Isak Vådebu (on loan from Tromsø)
30	GK	NOR	Mathias Kasseth (promoted from junior squad)
31	DF	NOR	Nikolay Jakobsen Hristov (from (Bulgaria) Slavia Sofia)

Out: Note: Flags indicate national team as defined under FIFA eligibility rules; some limited exceptions apply. Players may hold more than one non-FIFA nationality.

No.	Pos.	Nation	Player
1	GK	NOR	Erlend Henriksen (released)
9	FW	NOR	Sanel Bojadzic (to Bryne)
16	MF	NOR	Theo Aksnes Olsen (on loan to Rana)
25	DF	NOR	Isak Vådebu (loan return to Tromsø)

=== Lyn ===
In: Note: Flags indicate national team as defined under FIFA eligibility rules; some limited exceptions apply. Players may hold more than one non-FIFA nationality.

No.	Pos.	Nation	Player
13	GK	NOR	Marius Devor Lunde (promoted from junior squad)
14	MF	NOR	Eron Isufi (from Fredrikstad 2)
26	FW	NOR	Ole Breistøl (from (Denmark) )
28	FW	SEN	Mame Alassane Niang (from (Senegal) Diambars)
29	DF	SEN	Massiré Sylla (from (France) Pau)

Out: Note: Flags indicate national team as defined under FIFA eligibility rules; some limited exceptions apply. Players may hold more than one non-FIFA nationality.

No.	Pos.	Nation	Player
14	FW	NOR	Ibba Laajab (to Grei)
17	DF	NOR	Christopher Lindquist (to Ørn-Horten)
19	MF	NOR	Tobias Myhre (on loan to Ull/Kisa)
33	GK	NOR	Viktor Engh (to (United States) UNC Wilmington Seahawks)

=== Mjøndalen ===
In: Note: Flags indicate national team as defined under FIFA eligibility rules; some limited exceptions apply. Players may hold more than one non-FIFA nationality.

No.	Pos.	Nation	Player
3	DF	NOR	Markus Olsvik Welinder (on loan from Sarpsborg 08, then made permanent)
10	MF	NOR	Vegard Leikvoll Moberg (from Kongsvinger)
14	FW	NOR	Niclas Schjøth Semmen (on loan from KFUM)
18	FW	NOR	Nickolay Årsbog (from Asker)
22	DF	NOR	Fabian Holst-Larsen (on loan from Strømsgodset)
23	DF	NOR	Jesper Svenungsen Skau (on loan from Odd)
25	MF	NOR	Andreas Heredia-Randen (on loan from Strømsgodset)
26	DF	SRB	Aleksandar Lukić (from (Serbia) Voždovac)

Out: Note: Flags indicate national team as defined under FIFA eligibility rules; some limited exceptions apply. Players may hold more than one non-FIFA nationality.

No.	Pos.	Nation	Player
3	DF	NOR	Sondre Skogen (to (Austria) St. Pölten)
4	DF	NOR	Rasmus Holten (loan return to Brann)
14	FW	NOR	Keerat Singh (on loan to Lysekloster)
18	MF	GHA	Simon Appiah (to (Denmark) Ishøj)
21	DF	NOR	Peder Vogt (retired)
23	DF	NOR	Eivind Helgeland (loan return to Haugesund)

=== Moss ===
In: Note: Flags indicate national team as defined under FIFA eligibility rules; some limited exceptions apply. Players may hold more than one non-FIFA nationality.

No.	Pos.	Nation	Player
4	DF	SWE	Tim Björkström (on loan from Fredrikstad)
12	GK	NOR	Jarik Sundling (on loan from Sarpsborg 08)
13	DF	NOR	Marius Cassidy (from Frigg)
16	MF	NOR	Håkon Vold Krohg (from Frigg)
26	MF	NOR	Blerton Isufi (promoted from junior squad)
29	FW	NOR	Michee Mayonga (promoted from junior squad)
31	DF	NOR	Kristoffer Lassen Harrison (on loan from KFUM)
49	FW	ANG	Benarfa (from (Angola) Kabuscorp)
–	MF	NOR	Sondre Høydal (from Florø)

Out: Note: Flags indicate national team as defined under FIFA eligibility rules; some limited exceptions apply. Players may hold more than one non-FIFA nationality.

No.	Pos.	Nation	Player
4	DF	NOR	Henrik Gjesdal (retired)
7	MF	DJI	Anas Farah Ali (released)
12	GK	NOR	Elias Myrhaug Bachke (to (England) Brighton Electricity)
13	DF	NOR	Harald Linnebo Race (to (United States) Kentucky Wildcats)
15	DF	NOR	Adan Hussein (to Raufoss)
16	MF	NOR	Oliver Kjeilen Stavdal (to (United States) Kentucky Wildcats)
19	FW	NOR	Eythor Björgolfsson (on loan to Start)
21	DF	USA	Ian Hoffmann (to (Poland) Lech Poznan)
22	MF	NOR	Sander Martinsen-Wold (to (United States) Boston College Eagles)
–	MF	NOR	Sondre Høydal (on loan to Florø)

=== Ranheim ===
In: Note: Flags indicate national team as defined under FIFA eligibility rules; some limited exceptions apply. Players may hold more than one non-FIFA nationality.

No.	Pos.	Nation	Player
3	DF	NOR	Håkon Røsten (on loan from Rosenborg (second time))
16	FW	SEN	Seydina Diop (from (Senegal) Diambars)
20	DF	SEN	Mamadou Diang (from (Senegal) Diambars)
30	GK	NOR	Tor Solvoll (from Tiller)

Out: Note: Flags indicate national team as defined under FIFA eligibility rules; some limited exceptions apply. Players may hold more than one non-FIFA nationality.

No.	Pos.	Nation	Player
3	DF	NOR	Håkon Røsten (loan return to Rosenborg)
4	DF	NOR	Nikolai Skuseth (to Sarpsborg 08)
16	DF	NOR	Lasse Qvigstad (to Bryne)
18	DF	NOR	Brage Kvithyld (on loan to Stjørdals-Blink)
19	MF	NOR	Dennis Gaustad (on loan to (Cyprus) Aris Limassol)
22	FW	NOR	Sigurd Prestmo (on loan to Stjørdals-Blink)

=== Raufoss ===
In: Note: Flags indicate national team as defined under FIFA eligibility rules; some limited exceptions apply. Players may hold more than one non-FIFA nationality.

No.	Pos.	Nation	Player
3	DF	NOR	Adan Hussein (from Moss)
13	MF	NOR	Filip Heggdal Kristoffersen (on loan from Molde 2)
14	DF	GHA	Jamal Deen Haruna (on loan from Sogndal)
26	MF	NOR	Adnan Hadzic (on loan from KFUM)
23	MF	NOR	El Schaddai Furaha (on loan from Lillestrøm)
27	MF	NOR	Oskar Sangnes (promoted from junior squad)
29	MF	NOR	Torjus Rønningen (promoted from junior squad)

Out: Note: Flags indicate national team as defined under FIFA eligibility rules; some limited exceptions apply. Players may hold more than one non-FIFA nationality.

No.	Pos.	Nation	Player
3	DF	NOR	Torjus Engebakken (to Fredrikstad)
7	FW	NOR	Andreas Østerud (on loan to Kvik Halden)
13	MF	NOR	Filip Heggdal Kristoffersen (loan return to Molde 2)
14	DF	GHA	Jamal Deen Haruna (to Sogndal)

=== Sandnes Ulf ===
In: Note: Flags indicate national team as defined under FIFA eligibility rules; some limited exceptions apply. Players may hold more than one non-FIFA nationality.

No.	Pos.	Nation	Player
9	FW	DOM	Riki Alba (from (United States) Las Vegas Lights)
18	DF	NOR	Vegard Solheim (on loan from Haugesund)
18	MF	NOR	Olav Øby (from Kjelsås)
24	MF	NOR	Emir Derviskadic (on loan from Haugesund)
24	DF	NOR	Eirik Asante Gayi (from (Sweden) Brage)
29	MF	NOR	Alwande Roaldsøy (on loan from Molde)
30	GK	SEN	Serigne Mor Mbaye (on loan from Kristiansund)
32	DF	USA	Vuk Latinovich (from (Greece) Ilioupolis)

Out: Note: Flags indicate national team as defined under FIFA eligibility rules; some limited exceptions apply. Players may hold more than one non-FIFA nationality.

No.	Pos.	Nation	Player
1	GK	NOR	Sander Lønning (to Egersund)
18	DF	NOR	Vegard Solheim (loan return to Haugesund)
23	DF	NOR	Erik Berland (on loan to Vard Haugesund)
24	MF	NOR	Emir Derviskadic (loan return to Haugesund)

=== Sogndal ===
In: Note: Flags indicate national team as defined under FIFA eligibility rules; some limited exceptions apply. Players may hold more than one non-FIFA nationality.

No.	Pos.	Nation	Player
3	DF	NOR	Jesper Robertsen (on loan from Tromsø)
5	DF	NOR	Kristoffer Forgaard Paulsen (on loan from Viking)
11	FW	GHA	Emmanuel Mensah (from (Ghana) Koforidua Semper Fi)
19	FW	SEN	Yoro Ba (on loan from Tromsø)
29	MF	NOR	Kristoffer Haukås Steinset (loan return from Hødd)
33	DF	NOR	Andreas Kalstad (promoted from junior squad)
–	DF	GHA	Jamal Deen Haruna (from Raufoss)

Out: Note: Flags indicate national team as defined under FIFA eligibility rules; some limited exceptions apply. Players may hold more than one non-FIFA nationality.

No.	Pos.	Nation	Player
7	MF	GHA	Edmund Baidoo (to (Austria) Red Bull Salzburg)
11	DF	NOR	Andreas Hoven (to Stabæk)
21	GK	NOR	Magnus Stær-Jensen (loan return to Vålerenga)
29	MF	NOR	Kristoffer Haukås Steinset (on loan to Hødd)
37	FW	NOR	Johannes Konstali-Lødemel (to Hødd)
–	DF	GHA	Jamal Deen Haruna (on loan to Raufoss)

=== Stabæk ===
In: Note: Flags indicate national team as defined under FIFA eligibility rules; some limited exceptions apply. Players may hold more than one non-FIFA nationality.

No.	Pos.	Nation	Player
5	DF	NOR	Jørgen Skjelvik (from (Cyprus) Apollon Limassol)
8	FW	NOR	Magnus Lankhof Dahlby (from Egersund)
16	DF	NOR	Andreas Hoven (from Sogndal)
26	DF	NOR	Joachim Nysveen (promoted from junior squad)
29	DF	NOR	Karsten Ekorness (promoted from junior squad)
31	FW	NOR	Richard Ferrington (promoted from junior squad)
33	MF	SRB	Aleksa Matić (from (Serbia) Voždovac)

Out: Note: Flags indicate national team as defined under FIFA eligibility rules; some limited exceptions apply. Players may hold more than one non-FIFA nationality.

No.	Pos.	Nation	Player
8	MF	USA	Chris Hegardt (on loan to (United States) Orange County)

=== Start ===
In: Note: Flags indicate national team as defined under FIFA eligibility rules; some limited exceptions apply. Players may hold more than one non-FIFA nationality.

No.	Pos.	Nation	Player
7	MF	NOR	Sigurd Grønli (on loan from Bryne)
13	DF	GER	Sebastian Griesbeck (from (Germany) Eintracht Braunschweig)
20	FW	NOR	Håkon Lorentzen (from (Netherlands) Helmond Sport)
23	FW	NGR	Mustapha Isah (on loan from (Denmark) Randers)
25	MF	NOR	Herolind Shala (from (Turkey) BB Erzurumspor)
27	DF	NOR	Ludvig Begby (on loan from Fredrikstad)
29	DF	AUT	Wilhelm Vorsager (from (Austria) Admira)
37	FW	NOR	Eythor Björgolfsson (on loan from Moss)
45	GK	DEN	Jacob Pryts (from (Austria) Silkeborg)

Out: Note: Flags indicate national team as defined under FIFA eligibility rules; some limited exceptions apply. Players may hold more than one non-FIFA nationality.

No.	Pos.	Nation	Player
3	DF	NOR	Altin Ujkani (on loan to Fløy)
7	FW	SWE	Marijan Cosic (to (Sweden) Stockholm Internazionale)
10	FW	GAM	Alagie Sanyang (to Sarpsborg 08)
14	DF	FIN	Kalle Wallius (on loan to (Finland) Mariehamn)
25	MF	NOR	Jesper Gregersen (to Sarpsborg 08)
26	GK	NOR	Mats Viken (released)
27	FW	NOR	Sander Svela (on loan to Arendal, previously on loan at Junkeren)
30	DF	NOR	Fabian Østigård Ness (to (Faroe Islands) B36 Tórshavn)

=== Vålerenga ===
In: Note: Flags indicate national team as defined under FIFA eligibility rules; some limited exceptions apply. Players may hold more than one non-FIFA nationality.

No.	Pos.	Nation	Player
17	MF	DEN	Carl Lange (from (Denmark) Vendsyssel)
29	MF	CMR	Brice Ambina (from (South Africa) Cape Town City, previously on loan)
55	DF	NOR	Sebastian Jarl (from Kristiansund)
80	FW	DEN	Muamer Brajanac (from (Denmark) Randers)

Out: Note: Flags indicate national team as defined under FIFA eligibility rules; some limited exceptions apply. Players may hold more than one non-FIFA nationality.

No.	Pos.	Nation	Player
11	MF	FIN	Daniel Håkans (to (Poland) Lech Poznań)
13	GK	NOR	Magnus Stær-Jensen (on loan to Strømmen, previously on loan at Sogndal)
23	DF	AUT	Martin Kreuzriegler (to (Austria) Grazer AK)
27	FW	NOR	Adrian Kurd Rønning (to Kristiansund)
32	DF	NOR	Max Bjurstrøm (to Kjelsås)
–	DF	ALB	Eneo Bitri (on loan to (Hungary) Győr, previously on loan at (Poland) Cracovia)
–	MF	NOR	Mohamed Ofkir (on loan to Hamkam, previously on loan at (Turkey) Manisa)

=== Åsane ===
In: Note: Flags indicate national team as defined under FIFA eligibility rules; some limited exceptions apply. Players may hold more than one non-FIFA nationality.

No.	Pos.	Nation	Player
4	DF	NOR	Eirik Lereng (on loan from Arendal)
22	DF	NOR	Dennis Møller Wolfe (promoted from junior squad)
23	FW	NOR	Sebastian Haugland (from Sandviken)
24	GK	SWE	Sebastian Selin (on loan from (Sweden) Hammarby TFF)
26	MF	NGR	Efe Lucky (on loan from Lillestrøm)
28	DF	NOR	Patrick Wiik (promoted from junior squad)

Out: Note: Flags indicate national team as defined under FIFA eligibility rules; some limited exceptions apply. Players may hold more than one non-FIFA nationality.

No.	Pos.	Nation	Player
4	DF	NOR	Ole Martin Kolskogen (to (Denmark) Horsens)
7	MF	NOR	Mats Selmer Thornes (to Bryne)
25	FW	NOR	Emmanuel Tchotcho Bangoura (on loan to Sandviken)
27	MF	NOR	Thomas Roger Lotsberg (on loan to Arendal)
