= List of Norwegian football transfers summer 2025 =

This is a list of Norwegian football transfers in the 2025 summer transfer window by club. Only clubs of the 2025 Eliteserien and 2025 Norwegian First Division are included.

== Eliteserien ==
=== Bodø/Glimt ===
In: Note: Flags indicate national team as defined under FIFA eligibility rules; some limited exceptions apply. Players may hold more than one non-FIFA nationality.

No.	Pos.	Nation	Player
17	FW	NOR	Ola Brynhildsen (on loan from (Denmark) Midtjylland)
22	MF	DEN	Anders Klynge (from (Denmark) Silkeborg)
23	MF	NOR	Magnus Riisnæs (from Vålerenga)
30	FW	DEN	Mathias Jørgensen (from (Denmark) AaB)

Out: Note: Flags indicate national team as defined under FIFA eligibility rules; some limited exceptions apply. Players may hold more than one non-FIFA nationality.

No.	Pos.	Nation	Player
16	MF	NOR	Syver Skeide (on loan to Kristiansund)
17	FW	SWE	Samuel Burakovsky (on loan to (Denmark) Kolding, previously on loan at Lyn)
27	FW	NOR	Sondre Sørli (to Sarpsborg 08)
95	FW	DEN	Jeppe Kjær (to (Sweden) Mjällby)
–	MF	NOR	Gaute Vetti (released)

=== Brann ===
In: Note: Flags indicate national team as defined under FIFA eligibility rules; some limited exceptions apply. Players may hold more than one non-FIFA nationality.

No.	Pos.	Nation	Player
4	DF	GHA	Nana Kwame Boakye (from (Moldova) Sheriff Tiraspol)
12	GK	NED	Tom Bramel (from (Netherlands) Vitesse)
18	MF	DEN	Jacob Lungi Sørensen (from (England) Norwich City)
20	DF	NOR	Vetle Dragsnes (from (Belgium) Charleroi)
22	MF	ISL	Sævar Atli Magnússon (from (Denmark) Lyngby)
29	FW	NOR	Noah Holm (from Rosenborg)
40	MF	NOR	Jesper Eikrem (promoted from junior squad, previously on loan at Åsane)

Out: Note: Flags indicate national team as defined under FIFA eligibility rules; some limited exceptions apply. Players may hold more than one non-FIFA nationality.

No.	Pos.	Nation	Player
2	DF	NOR	Martin Hellan (on loan to Stabæk)
12	GK	NOR	Martin Børsheim (to Fredrikstad)
20	FW	NOR	Aune Heggebø (to (England) West Bromwich Albion)
43	DF	NOR	Rasmus Holten (on loan to Sogndal)

=== Bryne ===
In: Note: Flags indicate national team as defined under FIFA eligibility rules; some limited exceptions apply. Players may hold more than one non-FIFA nationality.

No.	Pos.	Nation	Player
2	DF	DEN	Andreas Skovgaard (from (Poland) Cracovia)
3	DF	NOR	Patrick Wik (from Åsane)
10	MF	NOR	Magnus Grødem (on loan from (Switzerland) Yverdon-Sport)
20	MF	NOR	Jesper Gregersen (on loan from Sarpsborg 08)
22	MF	NOR	Heine Åsen Larsen (on loan from Tromsø (twice))
24	MF	DEN	Rasmus Thellufsen (from (Denmark) Vendsyssel)
28	FW	NOR	Jaran Eike Østrem (promoted from junior squad)

Out: Note: Flags indicate national team as defined under FIFA eligibility rules; some limited exceptions apply. Players may hold more than one non-FIFA nationality.

No.	Pos.	Nation	Player
2	DF	GER	Luis Görlich (to (Germany) SSV Ulm)
3	DF	NOR	Sondre Norheim (to Kongsvinger)
10	FW	NOR	Robert Undheim (to Rosseland)
21	MF	NOR	David Aksnes (on loan to Hinna)
24	DF	NOR	Jens Husebø (to Tromsø)
26	DF	NOR	Axel Kryger (to Kristiansund)

=== Fredrikstad ===
In: Note: Flags indicate national team as defined under FIFA eligibility rules; some limited exceptions apply. Players may hold more than one non-FIFA nationality.

No.	Pos.	Nation	Player
9	MF	NOR	Salim Laghzaoui (from Lyn)
10	FW	NOR	Johannes Nuñez (from KFUM)
21	DF	NOR	Fanuel Ghebreyohannes (from Egersund)
24	MF	NOR	Torjus Engebakken (loan return from Raufoss)
28	MF	NOR	Solomon Owusu (from Odd)
40	MF	NOR	Eirik Granaas (promoted from junior squad)
77	GK	NOR	Martin Børsheim (from Brann)
90	GK	DEN	Valdemar Birksø (loan return from (Denmark) Fredericia)

Out: Note: Flags indicate national team as defined under FIFA eligibility rules; some limited exceptions apply. Players may hold more than one non-FIFA nationality.

No.	Pos.	Nation	Player
3	DF	NOR	Brage Skaret (to KFUM)
9	FW	DEN	Emil Holten (loan return to (Sweden) Elfsborg)
15	DF	SEN	Fallou Fall (to (United States) St. Louis City)
21	FW	NOR	Jacob Hanstad (to Sandefjord)
30	GK	DEN	Jonathan Fischer (to (France) Metz)

=== HamKam ===
In: Note: Flags indicate national team as defined under FIFA eligibility rules; some limited exceptions apply. Players may hold more than one non-FIFA nationality.

No.	Pos.	Nation	Player
1	GK	NOR	Sander Kaldråstøyl Østraat (loan return from Fløy)
3	DF	NOR	Ethan Amundsen-Day (from (England) Aston Villa U21)
6	MF	NGA	Yusuf Saka Sulaiman (from (Nigeria) Sporting Supreme)
15	MF	NOR	William Osnes-Ringen (loan return from Raufoss)
20	FW	NOR	Julian Gonstad (loan return from Raufoss)
21	FW	NOR	Eron Gojani (from Eik Tønsberg)
24	FW	KOS	Ylldren Ibrahimaj (from (Czech Republic) Mladá Boleslav)
26	MF	NOR	Mats Pedersen (from (Denmark) Kolding)
28	FW	NOR	Alan Cole (promoted from junior squad)
32	MF	NOR	Markus Østerud (promoted from junior squad)
36	DF	NGA	Peter Sunday (on loan from (Nigeria) Manahaim)

Out: Note: Flags indicate national team as defined under FIFA eligibility rules; some limited exceptions apply. Players may hold more than one non-FIFA nationality.

No.	Pos.	Nation	Player
6	MF	NOR	Alwande Roaldsøy (loan return to Molde)
15	MF	NOR	William Osnes-Ringen (on loan to Raufoss)
20	FW	NOR	Julian Gonstad (on loan to Raufoss)
24	MF	NOR	Arne Hopland Ødegård (released)
26	DF	ISL	Brynjar Ingi Bjarnason (to (Germany) Greuther Fürth)
31	GK	NOR	Haakon Bleken Norda (to (Netherlands) Jong Feyenoord)
33	MF	NOR	Leo Haug Utkilen (to Stjørdals-Blink, previously on loan at Kjelsås)

=== Haugesund ===
In: Note: Flags indicate national team as defined under FIFA eligibility rules; some limited exceptions apply. Players may hold more than one non-FIFA nationality.

No.	Pos.	Nation	Player
3	DF	FIN	Niko Hämäläinen (from (Finland) KuPS)
8	DF	FIN	Pyry Hannola (from (Finland) SJK)
15	DF	NOR	Martin Bjørnbak (from Molde)
17	FW	NOR	Håvard Vatland Karlsen (from Os)
32	GK	NOR	Frank Stople (from Strømsgodset)
33	DF	FIN	Miika Koskela (on loan from Tromsø)
43	MF	NOR	Lars Tanggaard Eide (promoted from junior squad)

Out: Note: Flags indicate national team as defined under FIFA eligibility rules; some limited exceptions apply. Players may hold more than one non-FIFA nationality.

No.	Pos.	Nation	Player
3	DF	SWE	Oscar Krusnell (to (Sweden) Sirius)
8	MF	NOR	Morten Konradsen (to Ranheim)
21	MF	DEN	Julius Eskesen (to (Scotland) Dundee United)
37	MF	NOR	Sander Innvær (to Tromsø)
38	GK	NOR	Jasper Silva Torkildsen (loan return to Start)
39	MF	NOR	Martin Alvsaker (on loan to Vard)

=== KFUM ===
In: Note: Flags indicate national team as defined under FIFA eligibility rules; some limited exceptions apply. Players may hold more than one non-FIFA nationality.

No.	Pos.	Nation	Player
9	FW	NOR	Henrik Udahl (on loan from Hamkam)
11	FW	SOM	Bilal Njie (from Odd)
13	DF	NOR	Brage Skaret (from Fredrikstad)

Out: Note: Flags indicate national team as defined under FIFA eligibility rules; some limited exceptions apply. Players may hold more than one non-FIFA nationality.

No.	Pos.	Nation	Player
4	DF	GAM	Momodou Lion Njie (on loan to Sarpsborg 08)
9	FW	NOR	Johannes Nuñez (to Fredrikstad)
11	FW	NOR	Obilor Okeke (to (Sweden) Hammarby)
26	DF	NOR	Joachim Prent-Eckbo (on loan to Asker)
27	FW	NOR	Andreas Hegdahl Gundersen (retired)

=== Kristiansund ===
In: Note: Flags indicate national team as defined under FIFA eligibility rules; some limited exceptions apply. Players may hold more than one non-FIFA nationality.

No.	Pos.	Nation	Player
2	DF	NOR	Anders Børset (from (Germany) VfL Wolfsburg)
6	MF	NOR	Syver Skeide (on loan from Bodø/Glimt)
8	MF	SWE	Henry Sletsjøe (on loan from Rosenborg)
14	DF	NOR	Axel Kryger (from Bryne)
19	FW	NOR	Leander Alvheim (loan return from Ranheim)
26	GK	NOR	Knut-André Skjærstein (free transfer)

Out: Note: Flags indicate national team as defined under FIFA eligibility rules; some limited exceptions apply. Players may hold more than one non-FIFA nationality.

No.	Pos.	Nation	Player
6	DF	FRA	Axel Guessand (released)
8	MF	NOR	Ruben Alte (to Viking)
11	FW	NOR	Franklin Nyenetue (on loan to Egersund)
19	FW	NOR	Leander Alvheim (on loan to Ranheim)
24	FW	NOR	Awet Alemseged (on loan to Stjørdals-Blink)
30	GK	SEN	Serigne Mor Mbaye (released)

=== Molde ===
In: Note: Flags indicate national team as defined under FIFA eligibility rules; some limited exceptions apply. Players may hold more than one non-FIFA nationality.

No.	Pos.	Nation	Player
6	MF	NOR	Alwande Roaldsøy (loan return from Hamkam)
14	MF	DEN	Jacob Steen Christensen (from (Germany) 1. FC Köln)
24	DF	NED	Neraysho Kasanwirjo (on loan from (Netherlands) Feyenoord)
25	FW	NOR	Oskar Spiten-Nysæter (from Stabæk)
31	MF	NOR	Blerton Isufi (from Moss)
33	DF	NOR	Birk Risa (from (United States) New York City FC)

Out: Note: Flags indicate national team as defined under FIFA eligibility rules; some limited exceptions apply. Players may hold more than one non-FIFA nationality.

No.	Pos.	Nation	Player
2	DF	NOR	Martin Bjørnbak (to Haugesund)
4	DF	DEN	Valdemar Lund (on loan to (Denmark) Vejle)
10	MF	DEN	Mads Enggård (on loan to (Denmark) Vejle)
14	FW	NOR	Veton Berisha (to Viking)
15	MF	NOR	Markus Kaasa (to (Denmark) AaB)
22	GK	POL	Albert Posiadała (on loan to (Turkey) Samsunspor)
24	MF	NOR	Johan Bakke (to Strømsgodset)
25	DF	NOR	Filip Heggdal Kristoffersen (on loan to Notodden)
28	DF	NOR	Kristoffer Haugen (to Viking)
31	MF	NOR	Blerton Isufi (on loan to Moss, then to Sandefjord)
32	GK	NOR	Peder Hoel Lervik (on loan to Træff, previously on loan at Hødd)
–	FW	DEN	Frederik Ihler (to (Sweden) Elfsborg, previously on loan)

=== Rosenborg ===
In: Note: Flags indicate national team as defined under FIFA eligibility rules; some limited exceptions apply. Players may hold more than one non-FIFA nationality.

No.	Pos.	Nation	Player
7	MF	NOR	Simen Bolkan Nordli (from (Denmark) Randers)
16	DF	NOR	Aslak Fonn Witry (from (Bulgaria) Ludogorets Razgrad)
29	FW	SVK	Dávid Ďuriš (from (Slovakia) Žilina)
33	DF	NOR	Tobias Dahl (loan return from Moss)
35	FW	NOR	Emil Ceïde (from (Italy) Sassuolo, previously on loan)

Out: Note: Flags indicate national team as defined under FIFA eligibility rules; some limited exceptions apply. Players may hold more than one non-FIFA nationality.

No.	Pos.	Nation	Player
4	FW	DEN	Luka Racic (on loan to (Denmark) Lyngby)
7	FW	NOR	Marius Sivertsen Broholm (to (France) Lille)
14	FW	DEN	Emil Frederiksen (to (Croatia) Istra 1961, previously on loan at (Denmark) Horsens)
17	FW	ISL	Ísak Þorvaldsson (on loan to (Denmark) Lyngby)
18	FW	NOR	Noah Holm (to Brann)
22	MF	SWE	Henry Sletsjøe (on loan to Kristiansund)
41	MF	NOR	Sverre Nypan (to (England) Manchester City)

=== Sandefjord ===
In: Note: Flags indicate national team as defined under FIFA eligibility rules; some limited exceptions apply. Players may hold more than one non-FIFA nationality.

No.	Pos.	Nation	Player
5	DF	NOR	Aleksander van der Spa (loan return from Moss)
9	FW	NOR	Jacob Hanstad (from Fredrikstad)
11	MF	NOR	Blerton Isufi (on loan from Molde)
13	GK	FIN	Carljohan Eriksson (on loan from Sarpsborg 08)
28	DF	NOR	Theodor Martin Agelin (loan return from Mjøndalen)

Out: Note: Flags indicate national team as defined under FIFA eligibility rules; some limited exceptions apply. Players may hold more than one non-FIFA nationality.

No.	Pos.	Nation	Player
5	DF	NOR	Aleksander van der Spa (on loan to Moss)
9	FW	SWE	Darrell Tibell (released)
25	FW	NOR	Storm Bugge Pettersen (on loan to Eik Tønsberg)
28	DF	NOR	Theodor Martin Agelin (on loan to Mjøndalen)
43	FW	SWE	Elias Jemal (on loan to Start)
45	FW	BDI	Beltran Mvuka (to Sotra)

=== Sarpsborg 08 ===
In: Note: Flags indicate national team as defined under FIFA eligibility rules; some limited exceptions apply. Players may hold more than one non-FIFA nationality.

No.	Pos.	Nation	Player
4	DF	NOR	Anders Trondsen (on loan from (Sweden) IFK Göteborg)
13	DF	NOR	Bjørn Inge Utvik (from (Canada) Vancouver Whitecaps)
15	FW	DEN	Michael Opoku (from (Denmark) Lyngby)
17	MF	NOR	Heine Gikling Bruseth (on loan from (United States) San Diego)
18	MF	SEN	Bop Gueye (from (Senegal) Oslo FA)
26	FW	NGA	Daniel Job (loan return from Egersund)
27	DF	GAM	Momodou Lion Njie (on loan from KFUM)
28	FW	NOR	Sondre Sørli (from Bodø/Glimt)
33	MF	DEN	Andreas Nibe (from (Denmark) Midtjylland)
82	MF	NGA	Malik Olatunji (promoted from U23 squad)

Out: Note: Flags indicate national team as defined under FIFA eligibility rules; some limited exceptions apply. Players may hold more than one non-FIFA nationality.

No.	Pos.	Nation	Player
4	DF	NOR	Nikolai Skuseth (on loan to Aalesund)
13	GK	FIN	Carljohan Eriksson (on loan to Sandefjord)
18	MF	DEN	Mike Vestergård (to (Denmark) Vejle)
25	MF	NOR	Jesper Gregersen (on loan to Bryne, previously on loan at Aalesund)
27	FW	NOR	Sondre Ørjasæter (to (Netherlands) Twente)
29	FW	NOR	Martin Håheim-Elveseter (on loan to Egersund)
30	DF	NGA	Franklin Tebo Uchenna (to (Serbia) Red Star)
77	DF	NOR	Adam Kaszuba (on loan to Notodden)
80	MF	NOR	Szymon Roguski (on loan to (Italy) Cagliari Primavera)
99	DF	NOR	Elias Kringberg Haug (to Sarpsborg FK)

=== Strømsgodset ===
In: Note: Flags indicate national team as defined under FIFA eligibility rules; some limited exceptions apply. Players may hold more than one non-FIFA nationality.

No.	Pos.	Nation	Player
17	MF	NOR	Johan Bakke (from Molde)
20	FW	SLE	Alie Conteh (from Mjøndalen)
38	GK	NOR	Jasper Silva Torkildsen (on loan from Start)
80	FW	NOR	Gustav Wikheim (from (Denmark) Nordsjælland)
99	FW	GHA	James Ampofo (from Raufoss)

Out: Note: Flags indicate national team as defined under FIFA eligibility rules; some limited exceptions apply. Players may hold more than one non-FIFA nationality.

No.	Pos.	Nation	Player
7	FW	SWE	Nikolaj Möller (loan return to (Switzerland) St. Gallen)
17	DF	ISL	Logi Tómasson (to (Turkey) Samsunspor)
22	MF	NOR	Jonas Therkelsen (to (Germany) Holstein Kiel)
32	GK	NOR	Frank Stople (to Haugesund, previously on loan at (Sweden) Östersund)

=== Tromsø ===
In: Note: Flags indicate national team as defined under FIFA eligibility rules; some limited exceptions apply. Players may hold more than one non-FIFA nationality.

No.	Pos.	Nation	Player
7	FW	NOR	Lars Olden Larsen (on loan from (Netherlands) NEC)
18	FW	NOR	Daniel Braut (from Sandnes Ulf, previously on loan)
23	DF	NOR	Jens Husebø (from Bryne)
29	DF	SWE	Alexander Warneryd (from (Sweden) Västerås SK)
30	DF	NOR	Isak Vådebu (loan return from Åsane)
37	MF	NOR	Sander Innvær (from Haugesund)

Out: Note: Flags indicate national team as defined under FIFA eligibility rules; some limited exceptions apply. Players may hold more than one non-FIFA nationality.

No.	Pos.	Nation	Player
3	DF	NOR	Jesper Robertsen (on loan to Hødd, then made permanent)
7	FW	NOR	Yaw Paintsil (to Lillestrøm)
8	MF	NOR	Kent-Are Antonsen (on loan to (Sweden) Värnamo)
10	FW	NOR	Jakob Napoleon Romsaas (to (Belgium) Charleroi)
16	DF	FIN	Miika Koskela (on loan to Haugesund, previously on loan at (Finland) AC Oulu)
19	MF	NOR	Heine Åsen Larsen (loan return from, then back on loan again to Bryne)
22	FW	DEN	Frederik Christensen (on loan to (Germany) FC Ingolstadt)
23	MF	NOR	Runar Norheim (to (Denmark) Nordsjælland)
32	GK	NOR	Mads Trige (on loan to Tromsdalen)
—	DF	NOR	Filip Oprea (on loan to Åsane, previously on loan at Egersund)
—	FW	NOR	Elias Aarflot (to Tromsdalen, previously on loan at Raufoss)

=== Viking ===
In: Note: Flags indicate national team as defined under FIFA eligibility rules; some limited exceptions apply. Players may hold more than one non-FIFA nationality.

No.	Pos.	Nation	Player
14	MF	NOR	Ruben Alte (from Kristiansund)
16	FW	NOR	Veton Berisha (from Molde)
23	DF	NOR	Kristoffer Haugen (from Molde)
29	DF	NOR	Tobias Moi (loan return from Åsane)
38	DF	NOR	Fillip Voster Botnen (promoted from junior squad)

Out: Note: Flags indicate national team as defined under FIFA eligibility rules; some limited exceptions apply. Players may hold more than one non-FIFA nationality.

No.	Pos.	Nation	Player
12	GK	NOR	Magnus Rugland Ree (on loan to Åsane)
22	DF	AUS	Franco Lino (on loan to (Australia) Melbourne Victory)
23	DF	SVN	Jošt Urbančič (to (Slovenia) Olimpija Ljubljana)
27	MF	USA	Christian Cappis (to (United States) Dallas)
30	GK	NOR	Thomas Kinn (to (Finland) AC Oulu)
31	MF	NOR	Niklas Fuglestad (on loan to Moss)
32	MF	NOR	Kasper Sætherbø (on loan to Mjøndalen)
35	DF	NOR	Tobias Moi (on loan to Åsane)

=== Vålerenga ===
In: Note: Flags indicate national team as defined under FIFA eligibility rules; some limited exceptions apply. Players may hold more than one non-FIFA nationality.

No.	Pos.	Nation	Player
7	MF	NOR	Mohamed Ofkir (loan return from (South Korea) Suwon)
16	GK	DEN	Oscar Hedvall (from (Denmark) Viborg)
17	FW	NOR	Mathias Grundetjern (from Start)
18	MF	NOR	Evenezer Forcha (from Bærum)
19	FW	NGA	Promise Meliga (from (Nigeria) Beyond Limits)
37	DF	NOR	Ivan Näsberg (from (Denmark) Viborg)

Out: Note: Flags indicate national team as defined under FIFA eligibility rules; some limited exceptions apply. Players may hold more than one non-FIFA nationality.

No.	Pos.	Nation	Player
2	DF	NOR	Christian Borchgrevink (to (Scotland) Hearts)
7	MF	NOR	Magnus Riisnæs (to Bodø/Glimt)
9	FW	NED	Mees Rijks (on loan to (Netherlands) De Graafschap)
21	GK	NOR	Magnus Sjøeng (on loan to Stabæk)
80	FW	DEN	Muamer Brajanac (to (Denmark) Esbjerg)
–	DF	ALB	Eneo Bitri (to (Hungary) Nyíregyháza Spartacus, previously on loan at (Hungary) Győr)

== 1. divisjon ==
=== Aalesund ===
In: Note: Flags indicate national team as defined under FIFA eligibility rules; some limited exceptions apply. Players may hold more than one non-FIFA nationality.

No.	Pos.	Nation	Player
15	DF	NOR	Nikolai Skuseth (on loan from Sarpsborg 08)
16	DF	NOR	Jakob Nyland Ørsahl (from Raufoss)
17	FW	NOR	Elias Myrlid (from Hødd)
21	MF	DEN	Mathias Christensen (from (Denmark) Helsingør)
36	MF	NOR	Tellef Ytterland (promoted from junior squad)
–	DF	NOR	Nicholas Alme Bakke (from Volda)

Out: Note: Flags indicate national team as defined under FIFA eligibility rules; some limited exceptions apply. Players may hold more than one non-FIFA nationality.

No.	Pos.	Nation	Player
10	FW	POR	Cláudio Braga (to (Scotland) Hearts)
15	MF	NOR	Jesper Gregersen (loan return to Sarpsborg 08)
17	FW	NOR	Noah Solskjær (to Stjørdals-Blink, previously on loan at Brattvåg)
28	MF	NOR	Eivind Kolve (on loan to Jerv, previously on loan at Levanger)
35	DF	NOR	Sebastian Berntsen (on loan to Brattvåg, then released to (United States) Rhode Island Rams)
—	DF	NOR	Nicholas Alme Bakke (on loan to Volda)

=== Egersund ===
In: Note: Flags indicate national team as defined under FIFA eligibility rules; some limited exceptions apply. Players may hold more than one non-FIFA nationality.

No.	Pos.	Nation	Player
7	FW	DEN	Nicolaj Tornvig (on loan from (Denmark) Midtjylland U20)
14	FW	NOR	Adrian Rogulj (from (Netherlands) Emmen)
15	FW	NOR	Olliver Toft Noreng (promoted from junior squad)
18	DF	NOR	Philip Hovland (loan return from Vidar)
19	FW	NGA	Samuel Adegbenro (from (China) Beijing Guoan)
29	FW	NOR	Martin Håheim-Elveseter (on loan from Sarpsborg 08)
30	MF	FRO	Árni Nóa Atlason (on loan from (Faroe Islands) Vikingur Gøta)
45	MF	DEN	Mathias Sauer (from (Denmark) AGF, previously on loan)
49	GK	NOR	Sem Aleksander Bergene (from Lillehammer)
77	FW	NOR	Franklin Nyenetue (on loan from Kristiansund)

Out: Note: Flags indicate national team as defined under FIFA eligibility rules; some limited exceptions apply. Players may hold more than one non-FIFA nationality.

No.	Pos.	Nation	Player
7	FW	SWE	Othmane Salama (to (Sweden) Lund)
12	GK	NOR	Peder Klausen (to Notodden)
14	DF	NOR	Filip Oprea (loan return to Tromsø)
15	MF	NOR	Henrik Elvevold (to Hønefoss)
19	DF	NOR	Fanuel Ghebreyohannes (to Fredrikstad)
26	MF	LBR	Justin Salmon (to Odd)
28	FW	NGA	Daniel Job (loan return to Sarpsborg 08)

=== Hødd ===
In: Note: Flags indicate national team as defined under FIFA eligibility rules; some limited exceptions apply. Players may hold more than one non-FIFA nationality.

No.	Pos.	Nation	Player
7	MF	AUS	Matthew Scarcella (from (Australia) Sydney)
9	FW	NOR	Sebastian Haugland (from Åsane)
11	FW	SWE	Manaf Rawufu (from (Sweden) Norrköping)
24	DF	NOR	Jesper Robertsen (on loan from Tromsø, then made permanent)
26	GK	NOR	Mads Eikrem Myklebust (on loan from Molde 2)
29	FW	NOR	Oliver Eliassen Aske (promoted from junior squad)

Out: Note: Flags indicate national team as defined under FIFA eligibility rules; some limited exceptions apply. Players may hold more than one non-FIFA nationality.

No.	Pos.	Nation	Player
7	FW	NOR	Robin Hjelmeseth (retired)
9	FW	NOR	Elias Myrlid (to Aalesund)
11	MF	NOR	Andreas Waterfield Skjold (to Arendal)
16	DF	NOR	Iver Krogh Hagen (on loan to Brattvåg, then made permanent)
20	MF	NOR	Johannes Konstali-Lødemel (on loan to Fjøra)
26	GK	NOR	Peder Hoel Lervik (loan return to Molde)
26	GK	NOR	Mads Eikrem Myklebust (loan return to Molde 2)
27	FW	NOR	Andreas Televik (to Spjelkavik)

=== Kongsvinger ===
In: Note: Flags indicate national team as defined under FIFA eligibility rules; some limited exceptions apply. Players may hold more than one non-FIFA nationality.

No.	Pos.	Nation	Player
3	DF	NOR	Philip Fjellman (from Ullern)
7	MF	BIH	Emin Pajić (on loan from Vålerenga 2)
13	FW	NOR	Markus Flores (from Ull/Kisa)
14	MF	DEN	Frederik Juul Christensen (from (Denmark) Horsens)
15	MF	NOR	Vetle Lysell (from Ull/Kisa)
29	DF	NOR	Sondre Norheim (from Bryne)

Out: Note: Flags indicate national team as defined under FIFA eligibility rules; some limited exceptions apply. Players may hold more than one non-FIFA nationality.

No.	Pos.	Nation	Player
3	DF	NED	Pim Saathof (loan return to (Netherlands) Go Ahead Eagles)
7	MF	GHA	Eric Taylor (to (Slovenia) Maribor)
20	FW	NOR	Albert Sandstad (on loan to Jerv, then on loan to Eidsvold Turn)
25	MF	NOR	Marius Øien Damhaug (on loan to Eidsvold Turn)

=== Lillestrøm ===
In: Note: Flags indicate national team as defined under FIFA eligibility rules; some limited exceptions apply. Players may hold more than one non-FIFA nationality.

No.	Pos.	Nation	Player
7	MF	SWE	Linus Alperud (from (Sweden) Örebro)
26	FW	NOR	Yaw Paintsil (from Tromsø)
30	DF	NOR	Lucas Svenningsen (loan return from Skeid)

Out: Note: Flags indicate national team as defined under FIFA eligibility rules; some limited exceptions apply. Players may hold more than one non-FIFA nationality.

No.	Pos.	Nation	Player
9	FW	NGA	Kparabo Ariheri (on loan to Mjøndalen)
21	DF	NGA	Tochukwu Ogboji (on loan to Mjøndalen)
22	MF	NOR	Elias Solberg (released, previously on loan at Eidsvold Turn)
25	MF	NOR	Leandro Neto (on loan to Skeid, previously on loan at Mjøndalen)
27	FW	NOR	Markus Wæhler (on loan to Mjøndalen)
30	DF	NOR	Lucas Svenningsen (on loan to Skeid)
90	FW	NOR	El Schaddai Furaha (on loan to Ull/Kisa)

=== Lyn ===
In: Note: Flags indicate national team as defined under FIFA eligibility rules; some limited exceptions apply. Players may hold more than one non-FIFA nationality.

No.	Pos.	Nation	Player
24	MF	NOR	Didrik Fredriksen (from Åsane)

Out: Note: Flags indicate national team as defined under FIFA eligibility rules; some limited exceptions apply. Players may hold more than one non-FIFA nationality.

No.	Pos.	Nation	Player
2	DF	NOR	Jo Stålesen (on loan to Jerv)
7	FW	SWE	Samuel Burakovsky (loan return to Bodø/Glimt)
16	MF	NOR	Adrian Berntsen (to Sandnes Ulf)
23	MF	NOR	Salim Laghzaoui (to Fredrikstad)

=== Mjøndalen ===
In: Note: Flags indicate national team as defined under FIFA eligibility rules; some limited exceptions apply. Players may hold more than one non-FIFA nationality.

No.	Pos.	Nation	Player
10	MF	NOR	Kasper Sætherbø (on loan from Viking)
13	GK	NOR	Philip Sørlie Bro (promoted from junior squad)
19	FW	NOR	Markus Wæhler (on loan from Lillestrøm)
20	FW	NGA	Kparabo Ariheri (on loan from Lillestrøm)
21	DF	SWE	Victor Ekström (on loan from (Sweden) Sirius)
23	DF	NOR	Theodor Martin Agelin (on loan from Sandefjord)
24	MF	NOR	Birk Auråen Dahl (promoted from junior squad)
25	DF	NGA	Tochukwu Ogboji (on loan from Lillestrøm)
27	DF	GHA	Kweku Kekeli (from (Spain) Marbella U20)

Out: Note: Flags indicate national team as defined under FIFA eligibility rules; some limited exceptions apply. Players may hold more than one non-FIFA nationality.

No.	Pos.	Nation	Player
1	GK	NOR	Kristoffer Solberg (to Ørn Horten)
4	DF	NOR	Tarik Mrakovic (to Grorud)
10	MF	NOR	Leandro Neto (loan return to Lillestrøm)
20	FW	SLE	Alie Conteh (to Strømsgodset)
21	FW	NOR	Sander Bratvold (on loan to Levanger, then to Grorud)
23	DF	NOR	Theodor Martin Agelin (loan return to Sandefjord)
37	FW	NOR	Brinder Singh (on loan to Notodden)

=== Moss ===
In: Note: Flags indicate national team as defined under FIFA eligibility rules; some limited exceptions apply. Players may hold more than one non-FIFA nationality.

No.	Pos.	Nation	Player
6	DF	NOR	Aleksander van der Spa (on loan from Sandefjord)
6	MF	DEN	Mikkel Møller Lassen (from (Denmark) Vendsyssel)
9	MF	NGA	Jamiu Musbaudeen (from (Portugal) Mafra)
12	GK	NOR	Jarik Sundling (loan return from Brattvåg)
15	MF	NOR	Aksel Aasheim Engesvik (from Frigg)
17	MF	NOR	Patrick Andersen (from Brann 2)
24	MF	NOR	Blerton Isufi (on loan from Molde)
30	GK	NOR	Mathias Skott-Grande (promoted from junior squad)
34	MF	NOR	Niklas Fuglestad (on loan from Viking)
46	DF	NOR	William Strand Kvale (from Brann 2)
47	FW	ITA	Leonardo Rossi (from Brattvåg)

Out: Note: Flags indicate national team as defined under FIFA eligibility rules; some limited exceptions apply. Players may hold more than one non-FIFA nationality.

No.	Pos.	Nation	Player
6	MF	NOR	Alexander Håpnes (to (Denmark) AaB)
6	DF	NOR	Aleksander van der Spa (loan return to Sandefjord)
10	MF	NOR	Bo Hegland (to (Sweden) Djurgården)
12	GK	NOR	Jarik Sundling (on loan to Brattvåg)
14	GK	NOR	Altin Lajqi (on loan to Stjørdals-Blink)
17	MF	SEN	Laurent Mendy (released)
24	MF	NOR	Blerton Isufi (to Molde)
33	DF	NOR	Tobias Dahl (loan return to Rosenborg)
37	DF	NOR	Magnus Antonsen (loan return to Bodø/Glimt 2)

=== Odd ===
In: Note: Flags indicate national team as defined under FIFA eligibility rules; some limited exceptions apply. Players may hold more than one non-FIFA nationality.

No.	Pos.	Nation	Player
5	DF	DEN	Hans Christian Bonnesen (from (Denmark) Køge)
9	FW	CMR	Ivan Djantou (on loan from (Denmark) SønderjyskE)
17	MF	NOR	Siver Haugen Murtnes (promoted from junior squad)
36	MF	LBR	Justin Salmon (from Egersund)

Out: Note: Flags indicate national team as defined under FIFA eligibility rules; some limited exceptions apply. Players may hold more than one non-FIFA nationality.

No.	Pos.	Nation	Player
9	FW	NOR	Ole Erik Midtskogen (to Kjelsås)
10	FW	SOM	Bilal Njie (to KFUM)
16	DF	NOR	Casper Glenna Andersen (on loan to Pors)
17	MF	NOR	Solomon Owusu (to Fredrikstad)

=== Ranheim ===
In: Note: Flags indicate national team as defined under FIFA eligibility rules; some limited exceptions apply. Players may hold more than one non-FIFA nationality.

No.	Pos.	Nation	Player
3	DF	NOR	Christoffer Aasbak (free transfer)
20	FW	NOR	Leander Alvheim (on loan from Kristiansund)
20	MF	NOR	Morten Konradsen (from Haugesund)
22	MF	NOR	Tage Haukeberg (from Stjørdals-Blink)
26	FW	NOR	Jon Berisha (from Brann 2)

Out: Note: Flags indicate national team as defined under FIFA eligibility rules; some limited exceptions apply. Players may hold more than one non-FIFA nationality.

No.	Pos.	Nation	Player
5	DF	SEN	Mamadou Diang (on loan to (Belgium) Union SG U23)
6	MF	NOR	Lucas Kolstad (on loan to Åsane)
19	MF	NOR	Dennis Gaustad (to (Cyprus) Aris Limassol, previously on loan)
20	FW	NOR	Leander Alvheim (loan return to Kristiansund)

=== Raufoss ===
In: Note: Flags indicate national team as defined under FIFA eligibility rules; some limited exceptions apply. Players may hold more than one non-FIFA nationality.

No.	Pos.	Nation	Player
7	FW	NOR	Julian Gonstad (on loan from Hamkam)
18	FW	GHA	Emmanuel Mensah (on loan from Sogndal)
20	FW	GAM	Momodou Bojang (from (Finland) SJK)
27	MF	NOR	William Osnes-Ringen (on loan from Hamkam)
27	MF	NOR	Kristoffer Haukås Steinset (from Sogndal)
31	MF	NOR	Ulrik Danbolt (promoted from junior squad)
33	GK	NOR	Martin Ødegård Dalby (promoted from junior squad)
–	MF	NOR	Aleksander Sulland (from Skreia)

Out: Note: Flags indicate national team as defined under FIFA eligibility rules; some limited exceptions apply. Players may hold more than one non-FIFA nationality.

No.	Pos.	Nation	Player
2	MF	NOR	Torjus Engebakken (loan return to Fredrikstad)
6	DF	NOR	Jakob Nyland Ørsahl (to Aalesund)
7	FW	NOR	Julian Gonstad (loan return to Hamkam)
13	DF	BDI	Vaillance Nihorimbere (on loan to Gjøvik-Lyn)
18	MF	NOR	Kodjo Somesi (to Strømmen)
19	FW	NOR	Elias Aarflot (loan return to Tromsø)
20	FW	GHA	James Ampofo (to Strømsgodset)
27	MF	NOR	William Osnes-Ringen (loan return to Hamkam)
30	FW	NOR	Jonas Dalen Korsaksel (on loan to Gjøvik-Lyn)
—	MF	NOR	Oskar Sangnes (on loan to Bærum, previously on loan at Gjøvik-Lyn)
—	MF	NOR	Aleksander Sulland (on loan to Gjøvik-Lyn)

=== Skeid ===
In: Note: Flags indicate national team as defined under FIFA eligibility rules; some limited exceptions apply. Players may hold more than one non-FIFA nationality.

No.	Pos.	Nation	Player
2	DF	SEN	Boubacar Sadio Ba (from (Senegal) Mawade Wade)
20	DF	NOR	Lucas Svenningsen (on loan from Lillestrøm)
20	DF	GHA	Jamal Deen Haruna (on loan from Sogndal)
21	MF	NOR	Leandro Neto (on loan from Lillestrøm)
27	FW	NGA	Gift Sunday (on loan from Bodø/Glimt 2)
30	GK	SUI	Ardian Bajrami (on loan from (Switzerland) Young Boys)
45	FW	NOR	Abel William Stensrud (from (Italy) Trapani)

Out: Note: Flags indicate national team as defined under FIFA eligibility rules; some limited exceptions apply. Players may hold more than one non-FIFA nationality.

No.	Pos.	Nation	Player
18	FW	NOR	Emil Tjøstheim (to Follo)
20	DF	NOR	Lucas Svenningsen (loan return to Lillestrøm)
21	MF	NOR	Mikkel Wennberg Lindbäck (on loan to Eik-Tønsberg)
24	GK	NOR	Isak Solberg (on loan to Fløy)
25	MF	NOR	Leon Dahlstrøm (on loan to Lørenskog)
26	MF	NOR	Dino Sarotic (on loan to Fu/Vo)
28	FW	NOR	Habib Geir Diallo (on loan to Gamle Oslo)

=== Sogndal ===
In: Note: Flags indicate national team as defined under FIFA eligibility rules; some limited exceptions apply. Players may hold more than one non-FIFA nationality.

No.	Pos.	Nation	Player
4	DF	NOR	Rasmus Holten (on loan from Brann)
16	MF	LVA	Lūkass Vapne (from (Latvia) Metta, previously on loan)
19	MF	FIN	Tuomas Pippola (from (Finland) TPS)
20	FW	NOR	Preben Asp (from Grorud)
23	MF	POR	Fábio Sturgeon (from (Portugal) Mafra)
38	GK	NOR	Ard Ragnar Sundal (promoted from junior squad)

Out: Note: Flags indicate national team as defined under FIFA eligibility rules; some limited exceptions apply. Players may hold more than one non-FIFA nationality.

No.	Pos.	Nation	Player
11	FW	GHA	Emmanuel Mensah (on loan to Raufoss)
14	DF	GHA	Jamal Deen Haruna (on loan to Skeid)
19	FW	NOR	Erik Flataker (to (Sweden) AIK)
20	MF	GHA	Isaac Twum (released)
29	MF	NOR	Kristoffer Haukås Steinset (to Raufoss)
32	DF	NOR	Mathias Øren (on loan to Åsane)
77	MF	ISL	Óskar Borgþórsson (to (Iceland) Víkingur)
99	FW	MEX	Alejandro Díaz (to (Canada) Vancouver, previously on loan)

=== Stabæk ===
In: Note: Flags indicate national team as defined under FIFA eligibility rules; some limited exceptions apply. Players may hold more than one non-FIFA nationality.

No.	Pos.	Nation	Player
13	DF	NOR	Martin Hellan (on loan from Brann)
24	GK	NOR	Magnus Sjøeng (on loan from Vålerenga)
25	FW	GHA	Bossman Debra (from (Ghana) Kenpong Academy)
26	DF	NOR	Joakim Nysveen (loan return from Lysekloster)
32	FW	NOR	Abel Cedergren (promoted from junior squad)
41	GK	GER	Kimi Løkkevik (from (Austria) Lafnitz)

Out: Note: Flags indicate national team as defined under FIFA eligibility rules; some limited exceptions apply. Players may hold more than one non-FIFA nationality.

No.	Pos.	Nation	Player
10	MF	NOR	Herman Geelmuyden (on loan to Åsane)
11	FW	NOR	Oskar Spiten-Nysæter (to Molde)
24	MF	NOR	Kaloyan Kostadinov (to Sandnes Ulf)
–	MF	NOR	Brage Tobiassen (on loan to Grorud, previously on loan at Arendal)

=== Start ===
In: Note: Flags indicate national team as defined under FIFA eligibility rules; some limited exceptions apply. Players may hold more than one non-FIFA nationality.

No.	Pos.	Nation	Player
9	FW	NGA	Ahmed Adebayo (from (Estonia) Tammeka)
14	MF	EST	Markus Soomets (from (Netherlands) Den Bosch)
17	DF	NOR	Benjamin Sundo (loan return from Arendal)
27	FW	SWE	Elias Jemal (on loan from Sandefjord)
30	MF	NOR	Lukas Gausdal (promoted from junior squad)

Out: Note: Flags indicate national team as defined under FIFA eligibility rules; some limited exceptions apply. Players may hold more than one non-FIFA nationality.

No.	Pos.	Nation	Player
8	FW	NOR	Mathias Grundetjern (to Vålerenga)
12	GK	NOR	Herman Johnsen (to (United States) Monmouth Hawks)
22	MF	NOR	Adrian Eftestad Nilsen (on loan to Arendal)
27	FW	NGA	Gift Sunday (loan return to Bodø/Glimt 2)
31	FW	NOR	Jonas Seim (on loan to Levanger, then to Fløy)
–	GK	NOR	Jasper Silva Torkildsen (on loan to Strømsgodset, previously on loan at Haugesund)

=== Åsane ===
In: Note: Flags indicate national team as defined under FIFA eligibility rules; some limited exceptions apply. Players may hold more than one non-FIFA nationality.

No.	Pos.	Nation	Player
7	DF	NOR	Tobias Moi (on loan from Viking)
15	DF	NOR	Filip Oprea (on loan from Tromsø)
16	MF	NOR	Lucas Kolstad (on loan from Ranheim)
19	MF	NOR	Herman Geelmuyden (on loan from Stabæk)
23	DF	NOR	Mathias Øren (on loan from Sogndal)
26	DF	NOR	Malte Fismen (promoted from junior squad)
29	FW	NOR	Emmanuel Grønner (from (Romania) Argeș)
99	GK	NOR	Magnus Rugland Ree (on loan from Viking)

Out: Note: Flags indicate national team as defined under FIFA eligibility rules; some limited exceptions apply. Players may hold more than one non-FIFA nationality.

No.	Pos.	Nation	Player
1	GK	NOR	Simen Lillevik Kjellevold (to Eidsvold Turn)
7	MF	NOR	Jesper Eikrem (loan return to Brann 2)
7	DF	NOR	Tobias Moi (loan return to Viking)
12	GK	NOR	Oliver Madsen (on loan to (Sweden) Stocksund)
15	DF	NOR	Sander Eng Strand (to (Denmark) Esbjerg)
16	MF	NOR	Didrik Fredriksen (to Lyn)
19	DF	NOR	Isak Vådebu (loan return to Tromsø)
23	FW	NOR	Sebastian Haugland (to Hødd)
25	FW	NOR	Emmanuel Tchotcho Bangoura (on loan to Sandviken, previously on loan at Lysekloster)
28	DF	NOR	Patrick Wik (to Bryne)
45	MF	NOR	Sverre Spangelo Haga (on loan to Lysekloster)
