= 2025 Egersunds IK season =

Egersund
2025 season
- Manager: Endre Eide
- Stadium: B&G Parken
- 1. divisjon: 5th
- Promotion play-offs: Round 2
- 2025 Norwegian Cup: Fourth round
- 2025–26 Norwegian Cup: Third round
- Top goalscorer: League: Oscar Kapskarmo (13); All: Oscar Kapskarmo (17)
Home colours	Away colours

The 2025 season was the 110th in the history of Egersunds IK and their second consecutive season in the second tier of Norwegian football. The club competed in the Norwegian First Division and the Norwegian Football Cup

== Transfers ==
=== In ===
Pos.	Player	Transferred from	Fee	Date	Source
DF	(Sweden) Isak Jönsson	(Sweden) Västerås SK		10 December 2024	
MF	(Norway) Scott Vatne	(United States) Elon Phoenix		4 January 2025	
FW	(Norway) Oscar Kapskarmo	(Norway) Bodø/Glimt	Undisclosed	5 January 2025	
MF	(Sweden) Othmane Salama	(Sweden) Trelleborgs FF		7 January 2025	
DF	(Norway) Herman Kleppa	(Norway) Sandnes Ulf		13 January 2025	
GK	(Norway) Peder Klausen	(Norway) Odd		26 January 2025	
DF	(Norway) Nicolas Pignatel Jenssen	(Norway) IK Start		26 January 2025	
DF	(Sweden) Paya Pichkah	(Sweden) IF Brommapojkarna	Loan	13 February 2025	
DF	(Romania) Filip Oprea	(Norway) Tromsø	Loan	13 March 2025	
GK	(Denmark) Andreas Hermansen	(Denmark) AC Horsens	Loan	14 March 2025	
MF	(Denmark) Mathias Sauer	(Denmark) AGF	Loan	12 July 2025	
MF	(Norway) Martin Håheim-Elveseter	(Norway) Sarpsborg 08	Loan	18 July 2025	
FW	(Denmark) Nicolaj Tornvig	(Denmark) FC Midtjylland U19	Loan	21 July 2025	
FW	(Norway) Franklin Nyenetue	(Norway) Kristiansund	Loan	1 August 2025	
FW	(Nigeria) Samuel Adegbenro	Unattached		6 August 2025	

=== Out ===
Pos.	Player	Transferred to	Fee	Date	Source
DF	(Romania) Filip Oprea	(Norway) Tromsø	Loan return	30 June 2025	
MF	(Norway) Henrik Elvevold	(Norway) Hønefoss		26 July 2025	
DF	(Norway) Fanuel Ghebreyohannes	(Norway) Fredrikstad FK	Undisclosed	31 July 2025	
MF	(Sweden) Othmane Salama	(Sweden) Lunds BK	Contract terminated	1 August 2025	
GK	(Norway) Peder Klausen	(Norway) Notodden		18 August 2025	
MF	(Liberia) Justin Salmon	(Norway) Odd		22 August 2025	

== Friendlies ==
=== Pre-season ===
7 February 2025 Friendly	Viking (Norway)	4–1	(Norway) Egersund
14:30

15 February 2025 Friendly	Start (Norway)	0–0	(Norway) Egersund	Kristiansand
14:00				Stadium: Sør Arena

22 February 2025 Friendly	Kongsvinger (Norway)	2–0	(Norway) Egersund
16:00

8 March 2025 Friendly	Odd (Norway)	3–3	(Norway) Egersund
14:00

14 March 2025 Friendly	Haugesund (Norway)	1–2	(Norway) Egersund
15:00

23 March 2025 Friendly	Bryne (Norway)	1–1	(Norway) Egersund
14:00

== Competitions ==
=== Overview ===
Competition	First match	Last match	Starting round	Final position	Record							
Competition	First match	Last match	Starting round	Final position	Pld	W	D	L	GF	GA	GD	Win %
Norwegian First Division	31 March 2025	8 November 2025	Matchday 1	5th	30	15	7	8	51	38	+13	50.00
Promotion play-offs	22 November 2025	26 November 2025	Round 1	Round 2	2	1	0	1	4	5	−1	50.00
2025 Norwegian Football Cup	13 April 2025	20 May 2025	First round	Fourth round	4	2	1	1	11	6	+5	50.00
2025–26 Norwegian Football Cup	13 August 2025	24 September 2025	First round	Third round	3	2	0	1	5	4	+1	66.67
Total					39	20	8	11	71	53	+18	51.28

Source: Competitions

=== First Division ===
==== League table ====
Pos	Team	Pld	W	D	L	GF	GA	GD	Pts	Promotion, qualification or relegation
3	Kongsvinger	30	15	9	6	61	42	+19	54	Qualification for the promotion play-offs third round
4	Aalesund (O, P)	30	14	10	6	56	35	+21	52	Qualification for the promotion play-offs second round
5	Egersund	30	15	7	8	51	38	+13	52	Qualification for the promotion play-offs first round
6	Ranheim	30	14	6	10	48	48	0	48	Qualification for the promotion play-offs first round
7	Lyn	30	14	5	11	48	37	+11	47	

Source: OBOS-ligaen (in Norwegian)
Rules for classification: 1) Points; 2) Goal difference; 3) Goals scored; 4) Head-to-head points; 5) Head-to-head goal difference; 6) Head-to-head goals scored.
(O) Play-off winners; (P) Promoted

==== Results summary ====
Overall								Home						Away					
Pld	W	D	L	GF	GA	GD	Pts	W	D	L	GF	GA	GD	W	D	L	GF	GA	GD
30	15	7	8	51	38	+13	52	6	5	4	25	24	+1	9	2	4	26	14	+12

Source: NFF

==== Results by round ====
Round	1	2	3	4
Ground	H	A	H	A
Result	W	W	W	W
Position	2			

Source: NFF
A = Away; H = Home; W = Win; D = Draw; L = Loss

==== Matches ====
The league schedule was released on 20 December 2024.

31 March 2025 1	Egersund	3–2	Mjøndalen	Egersund
19:00	Amundsen Bergersen 43'; Salmon 57'; Vatne 71'		Svenungsen Skau 2', 9'	Stadium: B&G Parken; Attendance: 902; Referee: Ole-Alexander Ekeli Valen

5 April 2025 2	Åsane	0–2	Egersund	Bergen
16:00			Salmon 40', 45'	Stadium: Åsane Arena; Attendance: 625; Referee: Johan William Grundt

21 April 2025 3	Egersund	4–3	Skeid	Egersund
17:00				Stadium: B&G Parken; Attendance: 982; Referee: Abdulhadi Al-Fahad

28 April 2025 4	Raufoss	0–1	Egersund	Raufoss
19:00

3 May 2025 5	Odd	1–1	Egersund	Skien
16:00

16 May 2025 7	IK Start	2–1	Egersund

25 May 2025 8	Egersund	0–2	Sogndal

31 May 2025 9	Lillestrøm	1–0	Egersund

15 June 2025 10	Egersund	3–4	Ranheim

18 June 2025 11	Stabæk	1–3	Egersund

21 June 2025 12	Egersund	2–2	Kongsvinger

28 June 2025 13	Moss	2–4	Egersund

22 July 2025 6	Egersund	2–2	Aalesund

26 July 2025 14	Egersund	0–5	Lyn

30 July 2025 15	Hødd	1–0	Egersund

2 August 2025 16	Egersund	1–0	Odd

6 August 2025 18	Egersund	0–2	Lillestrøm

10 August 2025 17	Skeid	0–2	Egersund

19 August 2025 19	Lyn	1–1	Egersund

23 August 2025 20	Egersund	1–1	Åsane

31 August 2025 21	Aalesund	2–3	Egersund

13 September 2025 22	Egersund	1–1	Stabæk

21 September 2025 23	Kongsvinger	2–1	Egersund

27 September 2025 24	Egersund	2–0	IK Start

4 October 2025 25	Ranheim	0–4	Egersund

18 October 2025 26	Egersund	4–0	Raufoss

22 October 2025 27	Egersund	2–0	Moss

25 October 2025 28	Sogndal	0–1	Egersund

1 November 2025 29	Egersund	0–0	Hødd

8 November 2025 30	Mjøndalen	1–2	Egersund

==== Promotion play-offs ====
22 November 2025 Round 1	Egersund	3–2	Ranheim

26 November 2025 Round 2	Aalesund	3–1 (a.e.t.)	Egersund

=== 2025 Norwegian Football Cup ===
13 April 2025 First round	Eiger	1–7	Egersund	Egersund
16:00				Stadium: Bøgh Hafsø banen Referee: Jørgen Haga

24 April 2025 Second round	Jerv	0–1	Egersund	Grimstad
18:00				Stadium: Levermyr stadion Attendance: 931; Referee: Marius Lien

7 May 2025 Third round	Ranheim	2–2 (a.e.t.) (0–3 p)	Egersund	Ranheim
19:00				Stadium: EXTRA Arena; Attendance: 801; Referee: Eivind Bodding

20 May 2025 Fourth round	Egersund	1–3	Sarpsborg 08	Egersund
18:00				Stadium: B&G Parken; Attendance: 942; Referee: Kristoffer Hagenes

=== 2025–26 Norwegian Football Cup ===
13 August 2025 First round	Flekkerøy	1–2	Egersund

27 August 2025 Second round	Arendal	2–3 (a.e.t.)	Egersund

24 September 2025 Third round	Egersund	0–1	Lyn
