= 2025 Åsane Fotball season =

Åsane
2025 season
- Chairman: Espen D. Brochmann
- Manager: Eirik Bakke
- Stadium: Åsane Arena
- 1. divisjon: 12th
- 2025 Norwegian Cup: Fourth round
- 2025–26 Norwegian Cup: Second round
Home colours	Away colours

The 2025 season was the 52nd in the history of Åsane Fotball and their sixth consecutive season in the second tier of Norwegian football. The club competed in the Norwegian First Division and the Norwegian Football Cup.

== Transfers ==
=== In ===
Pos.	Player	Transferred from	Fee	Date	Source
GK	(Sweden) Sebastian Selin	(Sweden) Hammarby IF		20 December 2024	
DF	(Norway) Eirik Lereng	(Norway) Arendal		2 January 2025	
FW	(Eritrea) Nobel Gebrezgi	(Sweden) Hammarby Talang		4 March 2025	
FW	(Nigeria) Efe Lucky	(Norway) Lillestrøm	Loan	26 March 2025	
DF	(Norway) Andreas Vindheim	Unattached		27 March 2025	
MF	(Norway) Jesper Eikrem	(Norway) Brann	Loan	14 April 2025	
DF	(Norway) Isak Vådebu	(Norway) Tromsø IL	Loan	26 April 2025	
DF	(Romania) Filip Oprea	(Norway) Tromsø IL	Loan	25 July 2025	
MF	(Norway) Lucas Kolstad	(Norway) Ranheim	Loan	26 August 2025	
MF	(Norway) Herman Geelmuyden	(Norway) Stabæk	Loan	1 September 2025	
DF	(Norway) Mathias Øren	(Norway) Sogndal	Loan	1 September 2025	

=== Out ===
Pos.	Player	Transferred from	Fee	Date	Source
DF	(Norway) Sander Eng Strand	(Denmark) Esbjerg fB	Undisclosed	4 July 2025	
MF	(Norway) Didrik Fredriksen	(Norway) Lyn	End of contract	1 July 2025	
DF	(Norway) Patrick André Wik	(Norway) Bryne	Undisclosed	9 August 2025	

== Friendlies ==
=== Pre-season ===
17 January 2025 Friendly	Åsane (Norway)	1–2	(Norway) IL Bjarg
17:00

24 January 2025 Friendly	Åsane (Norway)	3–1	(Norway) Os TF
17:00

28 January 2025 Friendly	Åsane (Norway)	4–1	(Norway) IL Sandviken
18:30 UTC+1

31 January 2025 Friendly	Åsane (Norway)	2–4	(Norway) Brann
15:00 UTC+1

9 February 2025 Friendly	Åsane (Norway)	0–0	(Norway) Bryne
15:00 UTC+1

4 March 2025 Friendly	Åsane (Norway)	0–1	(Norway) Kongsvinger
16:30

7 March 2025 Friendly	Skeid (Norway)	0–0	(Norway) Åsane
13:00

15 March 2025 Friendly	Hødd (Norway)	2–3	(Norway) Åsane
13:00

23 March 2025 Friendly	Åsane (Norway)	4–0	(Norway) Sogndal
15:00

== Competitions ==
=== Overview ===
Competition	First match	Last match	Starting round	Final position	Record							
Competition	First match	Last match	Starting round	Final position	Pld	W	D	L	GF	GA	GD	Win %
Norwegian First Division	31 March 2025	8 November 2025	Matchday 1	12th	30	7	10	13	38	53	−15	23.33
2025 Norwegian Football Cup	13 April 2025	20 May 2025	First round	Fourth round	4	3	0	1	11	9	+2	75.00
2025–26 Norwegian Football Cup	13 August 2025	27 August 2025	First round	Second round	2	1	0	1	3	5	−2	50.00
Total					36	11	10	15	52	67	−15	30.56

Source: Competitions

=== First Division ===
==== League table ====
Pos	Team	Pld	W	D	L	GF	GA	GD	Pts	Promotion, qualification or relegation
10	Hødd	30	8	9	13	34	52	−18	33	
11	Stabæk	30	7	10	13	45	53	−8	31	
12	Åsane	30	7	10	13	38	53	−15	31	
13	Raufoss (Note: Raufoss were deducted 1 point.)	30	7	9	14	43	56	−13	29	
14	Moss (O)	30	7	7	16	41	65	−24	28	Qualification for the relegation play-offs

Source: OBOS-ligaen (in Norwegian)
Rules for classification: 1) Points; 2) Goal difference; 3) Goals scored; 4) Head-to-head points; 5) Head-to-head goal difference; 6) Head-to-head goals scored.
(O) Play-off winners

==== Results summary ====
Overall								Home						Away					
Pld	W	D	L	GF	GA	GD	Pts	W	D	L	GF	GA	GD	W	D	L	GF	GA	GD
4	0	2	2	3	6	−3	2	0	1	1	0	2	−2	0	1	1	3	4	−1

Source: NFF

==== Results by round ====
Round	1	2	3	4
Ground	A	H	A	H
Result	D	L	L	D
Position	8			

Updated to match(es) played on 28 April 2025. Source: NFF
A = Away; H = Home; W = Win; D = Draw; L = Loss

==== Matches ====
The league schedule was released on 20 December 2024.

31 March 2025 1	Kongsvinger	1–1	Åsane	Kongsvinger
19:00	Ramos Barmen 4' (o.g.)		Lie Skålevik 74'	Stadium: Gjemselund Stadion; Attendance: 1,662; Referee: Magnus Nicolai Koløy

5 April 2025 2	Åsane	0–2	Egersund	Bergen
16:00			Salmon 40', 45'	Stadium: Åsane Arena; Attendance: 625; Referee: Johan William Grundt

21 April 2025 3	Raufoss	3–2	Åsane	Raufoss
17:00				Stadium: Nammo Stadion

28 April 2025 4	Åsane	0–0	Aalesund	Bergen
19:00				Stadium: Åsane Arena

3 May 2025 5	Start	2–3	Åsane	Kristiansand
16:00

12 May 2025 6	Åsane	1–1	Stabæk

16 May 2025 7	Sogndal	2–0	Åsane

25 May 2025 8	Åsane	2–1	Ranheim

31 May 2025 9	Odd	1–0	Åsane

15 June 2025 10	Åsane	2–1	Skeid

18 June 2025 11	Lillestrøm	2–2	Åsane

21 June 2025 12	Åsane	2–1	Moss

29 June 2025 13	Lyn	2–1	Åsane

26 July 2025 14	Åsane	2–2	Hødd

30 July 2025 15	Mjøndalen	2–0	Åsane

2 August 2025 16	Åsane	1–2	Lillestrøm

6 August 2025 18	Åsane	0–2	Lyn

10 August 2025 17	Moss	1–2	Åsane

18 August 2025 19	Åsane	4–2	Raufoss

23 August 2025 20	Egersund	1–1	Åsane

30 August 2025 21	Åsane	1–1	Sogndal

13 September 2025 22	Ranheim	5–2	Åsane

20 September 2025 23	Åsane	0–2	Odd

27 September 2025 24	Skeid	1–2	Åsane

4 October 2025 25	Åsane	2–3	Mjøndalen

18 October 2025 26	Hødd	3–3	Åsane

22 October 2025 27	Stabæk	2–0	Åsane

25 October 2025 28	Åsane	2–2	IK Start

1 November 2025 29	Aalesund	3–0	Åsane

8 November 2025 30	Åsane	0–0	Kongsvinger

=== 2025 Norwegian Football Cup ===
13 April 2025 First round	Askøy	1–5	Åsane	Strusshamn
14:00	Pedersen 35'		Heimvik Haugland 3' (pen.); Ramos Barmen 28'; Lie Skålevik 82' (pen.), 87' (pen.), 90'	Stadium: Follese Tertnes Holding Arena; Referee: Ola Kellerhals

24 April 2025 Second round	Sotra	0–2	Åsane	Straume
18:00	Johansen (yellow card) 42' (yellow-red card) 48'		Nerhus Eikrem 33'; Flotve Myklebust 90'	Stadium: Straume Sotra stadion Attendance: 153; Referee: Steinar Hauge

7 May 2025 Third round	Os	1–4	Åsane	Osøyro
18:00				Stadium: Kuventræ Stadion; Attendance: 1,008; Referee: Jan Morten Tennøy

20 May 2025 Fourth round	Åsane	0–7	Viking	Bergen

=== 2025–26 Norwegian Football Cup ===
13 August 2025 First round	Gneist	2–3	Åsane

27 August 2025 Second round	Lysekloster	3–0	Åsane
