= Thomas Hafstad =

Norwegian footballer (born 1974)

Personal information
- Date of birth: 13 March 1974 (age 52)
- Height: 1.76 m (5 ft 9 in)
- Position: Full back

Senior career*
Years	Team	Apps	(Gls)
1994–2008	Tromsø IL	239	(30)
- * Club domestic league appearances and goals as of 26 July 2007

Thomas Hafstad (born 13 March 1974) is a retired Norwegian football player.

Hafstad was a right full back, but he also played in midfield. Hafstad played for Beisfjord, Narvik/Nor and Mjølner before he joined Tromsø IL on January 1, 1994. In 2009 Hafstad retired.

== Personal life ==
His sons Tobias and Didrik are also a professional footballers.

== Honours ==
- Norwegian cup champion 1996
