= Tobias Hafstad =

Norwegian footballer (born 2002)

Personal information
- Date of birth: 1 June 2002 (age 24)
- Place of birth: Tromsø, Norway
- Height: 1.78 m (5 ft 10 in)
- Position: Forward

Team information
- Current team: Tromsdalen
- Number: 5

Youth career
- –2019: Tromsø

Senior career*
Years	Team	Apps	(Gls)
2018–2023	Tromsø 2	36	(5)
2020–2023	Tromsø	27	(1)
2021	→ Arendal (loan)	22	(5)
2022	→ Arendal (loan)	7	(0)
2023	→ Egersund (loan)	12	(1)
2023	→ Egersund 2 (loan)	5	(0)
2024–	Tromsdalen	70	(4)

International career
2019	Norway U17	5	(0)
2020	Norway U18	3	(0)
2021	Norway U19	2	(0)
- * Club domestic league appearances and goals as of 15 November 2026

Tobias Hafstad (born 1 June 2002) is a Norwegian footballer who plays as a forward for Tromsdalen.

== Career ==
Hafstad grew up in Tromsø and played for Tromsø IL from an early age. In January 2020 he signed a professional contract with the same club.

Losing the start of the 2020 1. divisjon with mononucleosis, Hafstad made his debut for Tromsø in August 2020. In the 5–0 victory against Sandnes Ulf, Hafstad registered one assist.

In 2021 he was loaned out to Arendal most of the season. He later returned on a short-term loan in the summer of 2022 following an injury to Tord Salte.

On 7 August 2023, Hafstad was loaned out to Egersund, for the rest of the 2023 season.

After his contract with Tromsø expired, he signed for 2. divisjon side Tromsdalen in early 2024.

== International career ==
Hafstad has played for several of Norway's youth team's, including U17, U18 and U19 level.

== Personal life ==
He is the son of former Tromsø player Thomas Hafstad. His younger brother Didrik, also a footballer, currently plays for Gnistan.

== Career statistics ==
As of 9 December 2025

Appearances and goals by club, season and competition
Club	Season	League			National cup		Other		Total	
Club	Season	Division	Apps	Goals	Apps	Goals	Apps	Goals	Apps	Goals
Tromsø 2	2018	4. divisjon	7	0	—		—		7	0
Tromsø 2	2019	3. divisjon	14	1	—		—		14	1
Tromsø 2	2022	3. divisjon	11	3	—		—		11	3
Tromsø 2	2023	3. divisjon	4	1	—		—		4	1
Tromsø 2	Total		36	5	—		—		36	5
Tromsø	2020	1. divisjon	12	1	—		—		12	1
Tromsø	2021	Eliteserien	1	0	0	0	—		1	0
Tromsø	2022	Eliteserien	6	0	2	0	—		8	0
Tromsø	2023	Eliteserien	8	0	5	2	—		13	2
Tromsø	Total		27	1	7	2	—		34	3
Arendal (loan)	2021	2. divisjon	22	5	3	1	2 (Note: Appearances in 2. divisjon promotional play-offs)	0	27	6
Arendal (loan)	2022	2. divisjon	7	0	1	0	—		8	0
Egersund (loan)	2023	2. divisjon	12	1	0	0	—		12	1
Egersund 2 (loan)	2023	4. divisjon	5	0	—		—		5	0
Tromsdalen	2024	2. divisjon	24	1	2	0	2	0	28	1
Tromsdalen	2025	2. divisjon	23	2	4	0	—		27	2
Tromsdalen	Total		47	3	6	0	2	0	55	3
Career total			156	15	17	3	4	0	177	18
