= 2022 Tromsø IL season =

Tromsø
2022 season
- Chairman: Helge Kræmer
- Manager: Gaute Helstrup
- Stadium: Alfheim Stadion
- Eliteserien: 7th
- Norwegian Cup: Fourth round
- Top goalscorer: League: Eric Kitolano (13); All: Eric Kitolano (16)
Home colours	Away colours

The 2022 season was Tromsø IL's 102nd season in existence and the club's third consecutive season in the top flight of Norwegian football. In addition to the domestic league, Tromsø IL participated in this season's edition of the Norwegian Football Cup.

== Players ==
=== First team squad ===
As of 17 August 2022

Note: Flags indicate national team as defined under FIFA eligibility rules; some limited exceptions apply. Players may hold more than one non-FIFA nationality.

No.	Pos.	Nation	Player
1	GK	DEN	Jakob Haugaard (on loan from AIK)
2	DF	NOR	Oskar Opsahl
3	MF	NOR	Jesper Robertsen
4	DF	NOR	Jostein Gundersen
5	DF	NOR	Anders Jenssen
6	DF	NOR	Mikkel Konradsen Ceïde (on loan from Rosenborg)
7	MF	DEN	Felix Winther
8	MF	NOR	Kent-Are Antonsen
9	FW	NOR	Lasse Selvåg Nordås (on loan from Bodø/Glimt)
10	FW	NOR	August Mikkelsen
11	MF	NOR	Ruben Yttergård Jenssen (Captain)
12	GK	CAN	Simon Thomas
14	DF	NOR	Warren Kamanzi
15	FW	FIN	Jasse Tuominen (on loan from Häcken)

No.	Pos.	Nation	Player
17	MF	NOR	Eric Kitolano
18	FW	NOR	Elias Aarflot
19	DF	DEN	Niklas Vesterlund
20	DF	NOR	Casper Øyvann
21	FW	NOR	Tobias Hafstad
22	MF	NOR	Sakarias Opsahl
23	MF	NOR	Runar Norheim
24	MF	NOR	Daniel Bassi
25	MF	NOR	Lasse Nilsen
26	DF	NOR	Isak Kjelsrud Vik
28	DF	FRA	Christophe Psyché
29	FW	NOR	Didrik Hafstad
32	GK	NOR	Marius Tollefsen

=== On loan ===
Note: Flags indicate national team as defined under FIFA eligibility rules; some limited exceptions apply. Players may hold more than one non-FIFA nationality.

No.	Pos.	Nation	Player
—	GK	NOR	Mats Trige (at Alta until 31 December 2022)

== Transfers ==
=== Winter ===
In: Note: Flags indicate national team as defined under FIFA eligibility rules; some limited exceptions apply. Players may hold more than one non-FIFA nationality.

No.	Pos.	Nation	Player
1	GK	DEN	Jakob Haugaard (on loan from (Sweden) AIK)
2	DF	NOR	Oskar Opsahl (from Vålerenga)
14	DF	NOR	Warren Kamanzi (from Rosenborg)
15	FW	FIN	Jasse Tuominen (on loan from (Sweden) Häcken)
21	FW	NOR	Tobias Hafstad (loan return from Arendal)
24	MF	NOR	Daniel Bassi (promoted from junior squad)
29	FW	NOR	Didrik Hafstad (promoted from junior squad)
32	GK	NOR	Marius Tollefsen (from Alta)
60	FW	USA	Zyen Jones (on loan from (Hungary) Ferencváros)
—	MF	NOR	Tomas Stabell (loan return from Senja)

Out: Note: Flags indicate national team as defined under FIFA eligibility rules; some limited exceptions apply. Players may hold more than one non-FIFA nationality.

No.	Pos.	Nation	Player
1	GK	NOR	Jacob Karlstrøm (to Molde)
2	DF	ISL	Adam Örn Arnarson (to (Iceland) Breiðablik)
6	DF	NOR	Isak Helstad Amundsen (loan return to Bodø/Glimt)
9	FW	NOR	Runar Espejord (loan return to (Netherlands) Heerenveen)
10	FW	NOR	Mikael Ingebrigtsen (to Odd)
13	FW	CZE	Zdeněk Ondrášek (to (Poland) Wisła Kraków)
15	MF	NOR	Magnus Andersen (to Alta)
16	DF	NOR	Tomas Totland (to (Sweden) Häcken)
17	FW	NOR	Daniel Berntsen (to Junkeren)
32	GK	NOR	Mats Trige (on loan to Alta)

=== Summer ===
In: Note: Flags indicate national team as defined under FIFA eligibility rules; some limited exceptions apply. Players may hold more than one non-FIFA nationality.

No.	Pos.	Nation	Player
6	DF	NOR	Mikkel Ceïde (on loan from Rosenborg)
9	FW	NOR	Lasse Selvåg Nordås (on loan from Bodø/Glimt)
18	FW	NOR	Elias Aarflot (from Grorud)
21	FW	NOR	Tobias Hafstad (loan return from Arendal)

Out: Note: Flags indicate national team as defined under FIFA eligibility rules; some limited exceptions apply. Players may hold more than one non-FIFA nationality.

No.	Pos.	Nation	Player
9	FW	NGR	Moses Ebiye (to Aalesund)
21	FW	NOR	Tobias Hafstad (on loan to Arendal)
60	FW	USA	Zyen Jones (loan return to (Hungary) Ferencváros)
—	MF	NOR	Tomas Stabell (released)

== Competitions ==
=== Eliteserien ===
==== Results summary ====
Overall								Home						Away					
Pld	W	D	L	GF	GA	GD	Pts	W	D	L	GF	GA	GD	W	D	L	GF	GA	GD
30	10	13	7	46	49	−3	43	8	5	2	29	23	+6	2	8	5	17	26	−9

Last updated: 13 November 2022.

==== Results by round ====
Round	1	2	3	4	5	6	7	8	9	10	11	12	13	14	15	16	17	18	19	20	21	22	23	24	25	26	27	28	29	30
Ground	A	H	A	H	A	A	H	A	H	H	A	H	A	H	A	H	A	H	A	H	A	H	A	H	A	H	A	H	A	H
Result	L	W	D	L	D	D	D	D	D	D	D	W	L	W	L	W	D	W	L	W	L	W	D	L	W	W	D	D	W	D
Position	16	11	11	13	14	14	12	13	13	13	13	12	12	12	13	11	9	8	8	8	8	7	9	9	7	6	6	7	7	7

A = Away; H = Home; W = Win; D = Draw; L = Loss

==== Results ====
3 April 2022 1	Odd	2–0	Tromsø	Skien
18:00 CEST (UTC+2)	Ruud 6'; Jevtović 54'; Aas (yellow card) 77'; Bjørtuft (yellow card) 83'	Report	Psyché (yellow card) 22'	Stadium: Skagerak Arena; Attendance: 4,320; Referee: Rohit Saggi

10 April 2022 2	Tromsø	2–1	HamKam	Tromsø
18:00 CEST (UTC+2)	Psyché 10'; Opsahl 51'	Report	Kirkevold 15' (yellow card) 77'; Skjærvik (yellow card) 32'; Sørensen (yellow card) 84'	Stadium: Alfheim Stadion; Attendance: 2,181; Referee: Marius Hansen Grøtta

18 April 2022 3	Aalesund	2–2	Tromsø	Ålesund
18:00 CEST (UTC+2)	Haugen 18', 69'	Report	Øyvann (yellow card) 16' (goal) 51'; Gundersen 90+5'	Stadium: Color Line Stadion; Attendance: 5,191; Referee: Marius Lien

24 April 2022 4	Tromsø	2–5	Sarpsborg 08	Tromsø
18:00 CEST (UTC+2)	Gundersen 45'; Antonsen 75'	Report	Heintz 14'; Lindseth 34'; Salétros (yellow card) 44'; Molins 48'; Maigaard 52', 85'	Stadium: Alfheim Stadion; Attendance: 2,005; Referee: Kai Erik Steen

8 May 2022 5	Jerv	1–1	Tromsø	Grimstad
18:00 CEST (UTC+2)	Haarup 30'; Brenden (yellow card) 90+1'	Report	Ebiye 34'; Gundersen (yellow card) 48'	Stadium: Levermyr Stadion; Attendance: 2,512; Referee: Ola Hobber Nilsen

12 May 2022 12	Tromsø	1–0	Vålerenga	Tromsø
19:00 CEST (UTC+2)	Nilsen (yellow card) 13'; Kitolano 67'; Haugaard (yellow card) 90+3'	Report		Stadium: Alfheim Stadion; Attendance: 2,033; Referee: Svein Tore Sinnes

16 May 2022 6	Bodø/Glimt	1–1	Tromsø	Bodø
18:00 CEST (UTC+2)	Koomson (yellow card) 37'; Sørli (yellow card) 70'; Mvuka 90+3'	Report	Yttergård Jenssen (yellow card) 28'; Vesterlund 53'; Gundersen (yellow card) 71'	Stadium: Aspmyra Stadion; Attendance: 7,813; Referee: Kristoffer Hagenes

22 May 2022 7	Tromsø	1–1	Viking	Tromsø
18:00 CEST (UTC+2)	Yttergård Jenssen (yellow card) 63'; Brekalo 90+2' (o.g.)	Report	Pattynama (yellow card) 40'; Stesness (yellow card) 71'; Sebulonsen 73'; Viktsøl (yellow card) 90'	Stadium: Alfheim Stadion; Attendance: 2,219; Referee: Mohammad Usman Aslam

29 May 2022 9	Tromsø	2–2	Lillestrøm	Tromsø
18:00 CEST (UTC+2)	Gundersen (yellow card) 9'; Kitolano 42'; Ebiye 90+2'	Report	Mathew 60'; Dragsnes 72'; Hedenstad (yellow card) 85'; Adams (yellow card) 90+4'	Stadium: Alfheim Stadion; Attendance: 2,689; Referee: Marius Hansen Grøtta

19 June 2022 10	Tromsø	1–1	Haugesund	Tromsø
18:00 CEST (UTC+2)	Yttergård Jenssen (yellow card) 58'; Nilsen 89'	Report	Ndour (yellow card) 22' (goal) 48' (pen.)	Stadium: Alfheim Stadion; Attendance: 2,636; Referee: Ola Hobber Nilsen

26 June 2022 11	Sandefjord	2–2	Tromsø	Sandefjord
18:00 CEST (UTC+2)	Kurtovic 41'; Ofkir 51'	Report	Vesterlund 48'; Nilsen (yellow card) 52'; Opsahl (yellow card) 57'; Kamanzi 81'	Stadium: Release Arena; Attendance: 2,706; Referee: Svein Tore Sinnes

10 July 2022 13	Molde	5–1	Tromsø	Molde
18:00 CEST (UTC+2)	Knudtzon 15' (yellow card) 28'; Haugen 19'; Fofana 45+2', 61'; Kaasa 62'	Report	Kitolano 6' (yellow card) 38'; Vik (yellow card) 71'	Stadium: Aker Stadion; Attendance: 6,156; Referee: Svein Tore Sinnes

23 July 2022 15	Rosenborg	3–0	Tromsø	Trondheim
18:00 CEST	Rogers (yellow card) 28'; Jensen 38'; Dahl Reitan 44'; Chrupałła 90+2'	Report	Nilsen (yellow card) 90+1'	Stadium: Lerkendal Stadion; Attendance: 10,708; Referee: Kristoffer Hagenes

30 July 2022 16	Tromsø	3–0	Sandefjord	Tromsø
18:00 CEST (UTC+2)	Kitolano 9', 49'; Mikkelsen 14' (o.g.)	Report	Markmanrud (yellow card) 76'	Stadium: Alfheim Stadion; Attendance: 2,020; Referee: Sivert Øksnes Amland

3 August 2022 8	Kristiansund	1–1	Tromsø	Kristiansund
18:00 CEST (UTC+2)	Willumsson (yellow card) 34'; Isaksen (yellow card) 84'; Bye 90+4' (pen.)	Report	Nilsen (yellow card) 5'; Mikkelsen 18'; Haugaard (yellow card) 81'	Stadium: Kristiansund Stadion; Attendance: 3,724; Referee: Kai Erik Steen

7 August 2022 17	Lillestrøm	1–1	Tromsø	Lillestrøm
18:00 CEST (UTC+2)	Hedenstad 90+4'	Report	Kitolano 36' (yellow card) 90+5'	Stadium: Åråsen Stadion; Attendance: 5,073; Referee: Svein Oddvar Moen

14 August 2022 18	Tromsø	2–1	Kristiansund	Tromsø
18:00 CEST (UTC+2)	Opsahl (yellow card) 7'; Yttergård Jenssen 26'; Antonsen (yellow card) 38'; Tuominen 52'; Kitolano (yellow card) 66'; Winther (yellow card) 81'	Report	Jarl (yellow card) 19'; Kartum 68'	Stadium: Alfheim Stadion; Attendance: 2,539; Referee: Mohammad Usman Aslam

21 August 2022 19	Vålerenga	1–0	Tromsø	Oslo
18:00 CEST (UTC+2)	Layouni (yellow card) 35'; Strandberg 81'	Report	Vesterlund (yellow card) 35'; Antonsen (yellow card) 51'; Gundersen (yellow card) 59'	Stadium: Intility Arena; Attendance: 7,784; Referee: Christian Moen

28 August 2022 20	Tromsø	4–3	Rosenborg	Tromsø
20:00 CEST (UTC+2)	Mikkelsen 14', 90+1' (yellow card) 32'; Kamanzi 16' (yellow card) 32'; Yttergård Jenssen 48' (yellow card) 70'; Kitolano (yellow card) 83'	Report	Ingason 23', 29' (pen.); Rogers 35'; Skarsem (yellow card) 84'	Stadium: Alfheim Stadion; Attendance: 4,108; Referee: Tore Hansen

31 August 2022 14	Tromsø	1–0	Strømsgodset	Tromsø
19:00 CEST (UTC+2)	Norheim 7'	Report		Stadium: Alfheim Stadion; Attendance: 2,880; Referee: Marius Lien

4 September 2022 21	Haugesund	2–1	Tromsø	Haugesund
18:00 CEST (UTC+2)	Søderlund 32'; Zafeiris (yellow card) 60'; Christensen (yellow card) 62'; Sande 79'	Report	Kamanzi (yellow card) 11'; Kitolano 19'; Vesterlund (yellow card) 31'; Gundersen (yellow card) 38'	Stadium: Haugesund Stadion; Attendance: 3,406; Referee: Mohammad Usman Aslam

11 September 2022 22	Tromsø	3–2	Bodø/Glimt	Tromsø
18:00 CEST (UTC+2)	Nordås 13' (yellow card) 60'; Yttergård Jenssen (yellow card) 27'; Mikkelsen 38'; Nilsen (yellow card) 45'; Kitolano 55'	Report	Haikin (yellow card) 45'; Lode (yellow card) 77'; Žugelj 85'; Salvesen 89'	Stadium: Alfheim Stadion; Attendance: 6,691; Referee: Tom Harald Hagen

18 September 2022 23	Viking	2–2	Tromsø	Stavanger
18:00 CEST	Vikstøl 11'; Karlsbakk (yellow card) 21'; Skyttä (yellow card) 41'; Tripić (yellow card) 78'; Brekalo (yellow card) 80'; Traoré 90+2'	Report	Psyché (yellow card) 10' (goal) 47'; A. Jenssen (yellow card) 43'; Nordås (yellow card) 57'; Kamanzi 87'; Haugaard (yellow card) 90+2'; Antonsen (yellow card) 90+5'	Stadium: Viking Stadion; Attendance: 9,532; Referee: Sivert Øksnes Amland

1 October 2022 24	Tromsø	0–1	Molde	Tromsø
16:00 CEST (UTC+2)		Report	Brynhildsen 23'	Stadium: Alfheim Stadion; Attendance: 4,186; Referee: Espen Eskås

9 October 2022 25	Strømsgodset	1–2	Tromsø	Drammen
17:00 CEST (UTC+2)	Brunes 11'	Report	Mikkelsen 28'; Kitolano 87'	Stadium: Marienlyst Stadion; Attendance: 4,698; Referee: Tore Hansen

15 October 2022 26	Tromsø	3–2	Odd	Tromsø
16:00 CEST (UTC+2)	Winther 41'; A. Jenssen (yellow card) 80'; Antonsen 89'; Kitolano 90+5' (pen.)	Report	Ingebrigtsen 8', 55'; Gjengaar (yellow card) 38'	Stadium: Alfheim Stadion; Attendance: 3,124; Referee: Marius Hansen Grøtta

23 October 2022 27	Sarpsborg 08	1–1	Tromsø	Sarpsborg
16:00 CEST (UTC+2)	Opseth 83'; Ngouali (yellow card) 89'	Report	Kitolano 76'	Stadium: Sarpsborg Stadion; Attendance: 5,017; Referee: Svein Tore Sinnes

30 October 2022 28	Tromsø	2–2	Jerv	Tromsø
17:00 CET (UTC+1)	Opsahl 75'; Kitolano 76'	Report	Norheim (yellow card) 35'; Wilson 86'; Ugland 90+8'	Stadium: Alfheim stadion Attendance: 2,615; Referee: Kai Erik Steen

6 November 2022 29	HamKam	1–2	Tromsø	Hamar
17:00 CET (UTC+1)	Nouri 54'	Report	Kitolano 72'; Nordås 80'	Stadium: Briskeby Stadion; Attendance: 3,994; Referee: Tommy Skjerven

13 November 2022 30	Tromsø	2–2	Aalesund	Tromsø
17:00 CET (UTC+1)	Kamanzi 12'; Mikkelsen 85'; Kitolano (yellow card) 90'	Report	Kallevåg 20'; Ebiye 35'; Rafn (yellow card) 45'; Bolkan Nordli (yellow card) 78'; Kristensen (yellow card) 80'	Stadium: Alfheim Stadion; Attendance: 3,125; Referee: Rohit Saggi

==== Table ====
Pos	Team	Pld	W	D	L	GF	GA	GD	Pts
5	Odd	30	13	6	11	43	45	−2	45
6	Vålerenga	30	13	5	12	52	49	+3	44
7	Tromsø	30	10	13	7	46	49	−3	43
8	Sarpsborg 08	30	12	5	13	57	54	+3	41
9	Aalesund	30	10	9	11	32	45	−13	39

Source: Football Association of Norway (in Norwegian)
Rules for classification: 1) Points; 2) Goal difference; 3) Goals scored; 4) Head-to-head points; 5) Head-to-head goal difference; 6) Head-to-head goals scored.

=== Norwegian Cup ===
19 May 2022 First round	Ishavsbyen	0–8	Tromsø	Tromsø
18:00 CEST (UTC+2)		Report	Tuominen 8', 14', 26'; Kamanzi 12'; Norheim 33', 40', 74'; Olsen (yellow card) 59'; Jones 71'	Stadium: TUIL Arena; Referee: Kristian Kristiansen

22 June 2022 Second round	Skjervøy	1–4	Tromsø	Skjervøy
18:00 CEST (UTC+2)	Kaspersen 12'; Skogli (yellow card) 41'; Braathen (yellow card) 62'	Report	Kitolano 6', 18', 57'; Moses 87'	Stadium: Lerøy Stadion; Attendance: 350; Referee: Magnus Tjelle

17 August 2022 Third round	HamKam	0–0 (a.e.t.) (5–6 p)	Tromsø	Hamar
18:00 CEST (UTC+2)	Bjørlo (yellow card) 63'; Faerrón (yellow card) 82'	Report; Penalties	Winther (yellow card) 42'	Stadium: Briskeby Stadion; Attendance: 1,294; Referee: Ola Hobber Nilsen
	Penalties
	Pedersen (penalty missed); Melgalvis (penalty scored); Faerrón (penalty missed); Kuruçay (penalty scored); Hernandez-Foster (penalty scored); Onsrud (penalty scored); Faraas (penalty scored); Jendal (penalty missed)		(penalty missed) Tuominen; (penalty scored) Øyvann; (penalty missed) Vesterlund; (penalty scored) Jenssen; (penalty scored) Opsahl; (penalty scored) Aarflot; (penalty scored) Kamanzi; (penalty scored) Hafstad

Fourth round took place during the 2023 season.
