= Markus Johnsgård =

Norwegian footballer (born 1998)

Personal information
- Full name: Markus Johnsgård
- Date of birth: 20 November 1998 (age 27)
- Place of birth: Senja, Norway
- Height: 1.78 m (5 ft 10 in)
- Position: Midfielder

Team information
- Current team: HamKam
- Number: 8

Youth career
- –2015: Senja

Senior career*
Years	Team	Apps	(Gls)
2015–2021	Senja	109	(25)
2021–2023	Raufoss	52	(18)
2024–2025	Tromsø	12	(0)
2024	→ HamKam (loan)	8	(0)
2025–	HamKam	18	(2)
- * Club domestic league appearances and goals as of 23 July 2026

Markus Johnsgård (born 2 November 1998) is a Norwegian professional footballer who plays as a midfielder for HamKam.

== Career ==
=== Raufoss ===
Halfway through the 2021 season Johnsgård moved from Senja to 1. divisjon side Raufoss. His first goals for the club came in his third game against KFUM Oslo, scoring a brace.

=== Tromsø ===
In September 2023, Johnsgård signed a pre-contract with Eliteserien side Tromsø, joining the club from the 2024 season, lasting until the end of the 2027 season.

=== HamKam ===
On 2 September 2024 HamKam announced that they had loaned Johnsgård for the remainder of the 2024 season, with an option to buy him after the season. After HamKam initially rejected the option to buy on Johnsgård, they later signed him back in February 2025, for a reduced price.

== Personal life ==
He is cousins with fellow footballer Henrik Johnsgård who plays for Tromsdalen, and retired footballer Christer Johnsgård.

== Career statistics ==
As of 27 April 2026

Appearances and goals by club, season and competition
Club	Season	League			National cup		Europe		Total	
Club	Season	Division	Apps	Goals	Apps	Goals	Apps	Goals	Apps	Goals
Senja	2015	2. divisjon	4	0	0	0	—		4	0
Senja	2016	2. divisjon	11	0	1	0	—		12	0
Senja	2017	3. divisjon	26	7	1	0	—		27	7
Senja	2018	3. divisjon	22	6	2	0	—		24	6
Senja	2019	2. divisjon	21	7	1	0	—		22	7
Senja	2020	2. divisjon	13	2	—		—		13	2
Senja	2021	2. divisjon	12	3	1	0	—		13	3
Senja	Total		109	25	6	0	—		115	25
Raufoss	2021	1. divisjon	14	8	1	0	—		15	8
Raufoss	2022	1. divisjon	23	5	2	1	—		25	6
Raufoss	2023	1. divisjon	15	5	1	0	—		16	5
Raufoss	Total		52	18	4	1	—		56	19
Tromsø	2024	Eliteserien	12	0	3	2	2 (Note: Appearances in UEFA Conference League)	0	15	2
HamKam (loan)	2024	Eliteserien	8	0	0	0	—		8	0
HamKam	2025	Eliteserien	7	0	3	0	—		10	0
HamKam	2026	Eliteserien	3	1	1	0	—		4	1
HamKam	Total		18	1	4	0	—		22	1
Career total			191	44	17	3	2	0	208	47
