= Didrik Hafstad =

Norwegian footballer (born 2003)

Personal information
- Date of birth: 26 December 2003 (age 22)
- Place of birth: Norway
- Height: 1.85 m (6 ft 1 in)
- Position: Forward

Team information
- Current team: Tromsdalen
- Number: 16

Youth career
- –2022: Tromsø

Senior career*
Years	Team	Apps	(Gls)
2018–2022	Tromsø 2	36	(17)
2022	Tromsø	0	(0)
2023–2024	Tromsdalen	43	(15)
2025–2026	Gnistan	29	(4)
2026–	Tromsdalen	25	(10)
- * Club domestic league appearances and goals as of 15 November 2026

Didrik Hafstad (born 26 December 2003) is a Norwegian professional football player who plays as a forward for Norwegian Second Division side Tromsdalen.

== Club career ==
Hafstad played in the youth sector of Tromsø. He made his senior debut with the club's reserve team in 2018. He debuted with the first team in 2022 in Norwegian Football Cup.

On 22 December 2022, Hafstad joined Tromsdalen in 2. divisjon.

On 28 January 2025, Hafstad moved to Finland and signed with Veikkausliiga club Gnistan.

== Personal life ==
His father Thomas is a former professional footballer who played for Tromsø. His older brother Tobias is also a footballer.

== Career statistics ==
As of 15 November 2026

Appearances and goals by club, season and competition
Club	Season	League			National cup (Note: Includes Norwegian Cup and Suomen Cup)		League cup (Note: Includes Finnish League Cup)		Other		Total	
Club	Season	Division	Apps	Goals	Apps	Goals	Apps	Goals	Apps	Goals	Apps	Goals
Tromsø 2	2018	4. divisjon	2	1	—		—		—		2	1
Tromsø 2	2021	3. divisjon	8	4	—		—		—		8	4
Tromsø 2	2022	3. divisjon	26	12	—		—		—		26	12
Tromsø 2	Total		36	17	—		—		—		36	17
Tromsø	2022	Eliteserien	0	0	1	0	—		—		1	0
Tromsdalen	2023	2. divisjon	18	5	1	0	—		2 (Note: Appearances in 2. divisjon promotional play-offs)	1	21	6
Tromsdalen	2024	2. divisjon	25	10	2	0	—		2	1	29	11
Tromsdalen	Total		43	15	3	0	—		4	2	50	17
Gnistan	2025	Veikkausliiga	29	3	4	1	4	0	—		37	4
Tromsdalen	2026	Norwegian Second Division	25	10	4	4	—		—		29	14
Career total			133	45	12	5	4	0	4	2	153	52
