= Andreas Heredia-Randen =

Norwegian footballer (born 2006)

Personal information
- Date of birth: 22 February 2006 (age 20)
- Height: 1.81 m (5 ft 11 in)
- Position: Central midfielder

Team information
- Current team: Strømsgodset
- Number: 15

Youth career
- –2021: Asker
- 2023: Strømsgodset

Senior career*
Years	Team	Apps	(Gls)
2021–2022	Asker	19	(0)
2023–	Strømsgodset	31	(1)
2024	→ Mjøndalen (loan)	23	(0)

International career^{‡}
2021	Norway U15	7	(0)
2022	Norway U16	14	(2)
2023	Norway U17	12	(0)
2024	Norway U18	8	(2)
2025	Norway U19	6	(0)
- * Club domestic league appearances and goals as of 14 November 2026 ‡ National team caps and goals as of 20 June 2026

Andreas Heredia-Randen (born 22 February 2006) is a Norwegian footballer who plays as a midfielder for Strømsgodset.

== Career ==
He came up through the academy of Asker and signed a contract with the senior team in February 2021. He made his 2. divisjon debut in November 2021 against Kongsvinger. He also represented Norway internationally, starting from U15 and continuing through the youth categories.

In 2022, Club Brugge showed interest in the player. He was ultimately signed by Strømsgodset in the winter of 2023. He made his Eliteserien debut in October 2023 against Odd. In 2024 he was loaned out to Mjøndalen IF. Back in Strømsgodset, he was selected for the 2025 UEFA European Under-19 Championship.

== Personal life ==
Of partial Mexican descent, Heredia-Randen reportedly rejected a callup to Mexico U20 in 2025.
