= Felix Winther =

Danish footballer (born 2000)

Personal information
- Full name: Felix Vrede Winther
- Date of birth: 18 May 2000 (age 26)
- Position: Midfielder

Team information
- Current team: Fredericia
- Number: 6

Youth career
- –2019: Copenhagen

Senior career*
Years	Team	Apps	(Gls)
2019–2021	Fremad Amager	51	(2)
2021–2024	Tromsø	66	(1)
2024–	Fredericia	50	(3)

International career^{‡}
2019	Denmark U19	3	(0)
- * Club domestic league appearances and goals as of 19 May 2026 ‡ National team caps and goals as of 21 August 2024

Felix Vrede Winther (born 18 May 2000) is a Danish football midfielder who plays for Fredericia in the Danish Superliga.

== Career statistics ==
As of 21 August 2024

Appearances and goals by club, season and competition
Club	Season	League			National Cup (Note: Includes Danish Cup, Norwegian Cup)		Europe		Total	
Club	Season	Division	Apps	Goals	Apps	Goals	Apps	Goals	Apps	Goals
Fremad Amager	2019-20	Danish 1st Division	28	2	1	0	—		29	2
Fremad Amager	2020-21	Danish 1st Division	23	0	3	0	—		26	0
Fremad Amager	Total		51	2	4	0	—		55	2
Tromsø	2021	Eliteserien	9	0	0	0	—		9	0
Tromsø	2022	Eliteserien	26	1	2	0	—		28	1
Tromsø	2023	Eliteserien	13	0	1	0	—		14	0
Tromsø	2024	Eliteserien	18	0	3	1	3 (Note: Appearances in UEFA Conference League)	0	24	1
Tromsø	Total		66	1	6	1	3	0	75	2
Fredericia	2024–25	Danish 1st Division	1	0	0	0	—		1	0
Career total			118	3	10	2	3	0	131	4
