= Victor Ekström =

Swedish footballer (born 2003)

Personal information
- Full name: Victor Arvid Ekström
- Date of birth: 28 January 2003 (age 23)
- Place of birth: Stockholm, Sweden
- Height: 1.81 m (5 ft 11 in)
- Position: Right-back

Team information
- Current team: IK Sirius
- Number: 20

Youth career
- –2022: IF Brommapojkarna

Senior career*
Years	Team	Apps	(Gls)
2023	Täby FK	27	(0)
2024–	IK Sirius	25	(1)
2025	→ Gefle IF (loan)	3	(0)
2025	→ Mjøndalen (loan)	9	(0)
- * Club domestic league appearances and goals as of 6 November 2026

Victor Ekström (born 28 January 2003) is a Swedish footballer who plays as a right-back for IK Sirius.

== Career ==
He was a youth player in IF Brommapojkarna. In 2019 he was called up to a "Futures" national team training camp. His first senior club was Täby FK in Division 1. While still an amateur footballer, he simultatneously held a job as a cashier in Ica.

After one year in Täby, Ekström went straight to the Allsvenskan, signing for IK Sirius. He made his Allsvenskan debut in June 2024 against Norrköping. He did however not establish himself as a regular in 2024 or 2025, and was briefly loaned back to third tier with Gefle IF. Before the closure of the summer transfer window in 2025, Ekström was hastily loaned out to Norwegian club Mjøndalen IF in an effort to save that team from relegation to the third tier.

Having gained experience during his loan, Ekström started his first Sirius match in the 2026 Allsvenskan opener, followed by his first start at home ground in May 2026. Later in May, he scored his first Allsvenskan goal, which became decisive in a 2–1 victory over GAIS. Sirius surprisingly led the Allsvenskan table. With Sirius still leading the Allsvenskan table in November, Ekström was given a contract extension until the end of 2030.
