= Jesper Gregersen =

Norwegian footballer (born 2004)

Personal information
- Date of birth: 21 August 2004 (age 22)
- Place of birth: Kristiansand, Norway
- Height: 1.89 m (6 ft 2 in)
- Position: Midfielder

Team information
- Current team: Egersund on loan from Sarpsborg 08
- Number: 25

Youth career
- –2021: Start

Senior career*
Years	Team	Apps	(Gls)
2022–2024	Start	36	(2)
2024–	Sarpsborg 08	4	(0)
2025	→ Aalesund (loan)	5	(0)
2025	→ Bryne (loan)	9	(0)
2026–	→ Egersund (loan)	22	(1)

International career^{‡}
2023	Norway U20	3	(2)
- * Club domestic league appearances and goals as of 14 November 2026 ‡ National team caps and goals as of 17 June 2026

Jesper Gregersen (born 21 August 2004) is a Norwegian footballer who plays as a midfielder for Egersunds IK on loan from Sarpsborg 08.

== Career ==
Born in Kristiansand, he came up through the academy of IK Start where he made his senior debut in the 2022 1. divisjon. In October 2023 he was selected for international duty for the first time, making his debut for Norway U20, even scoring 2 goals in 3 matches.

Ahead of the 2024 season, Fredrikstad FK placed bids on the player, which were however rejected by Start. In the summer of 2024, Gregersen chose to leave Start and signed a long-term contract with Sarpsborg 08. He made his debut in the Eliteserien in August 2024 against Bodø/Glimt, ending in a 6–0 loss. In the same year, he was sidelined by an ankle injury.

He was not quite in contention for a starting place at S08, and in 2025 he was therefore loaned out to second-tier club Aalesunds FK. The loan lasted from April to June. After the loan ended, Gregersen went on a new loan (with an option to buy) to Bryne FK, who had previously wanted the player's signature. With Bryne he suffered relegation from the 2025 Eliteserien, succumbing to his previous club Aalesund in a playoff. Another loan followed, at Egersunds IK, lasting from April to July 2026.
