= Nikolai Skuseth =

Norwegian footballer (born 2004)

Personal information
- Date of birth: 18 May 2004 (age 22)
- Place of birth: Molde, Norway
- Height: 1.97 m (6 ft 6 in)
- Position: Centre-back

Team information
- Current team: Degerfors IF (on loan from Sarpsborg 08)
- Number: 3

Youth career
- –2023: Molde

Senior career*
Years	Team	Apps	(Gls)
2021–2023	Molde 2	38	(2)
2023–2024	Ranheim	32	(1)
2025–	Sarpsborg 08	7	(0)
2025	→ Aalesund (loan)	10	(0)
2026	→ Kristiansund (loan)	3	(0)
2026–	→ Degerfors IF (loan)	6	(0)

International career
2023	Norway U20	3	(0)
- * Club domestic league appearances and goals as of 25 August 2026

Nikolai Skuseth (born 18 May 2004) is a footballer who plays as a centre-back for Degerfors IF in the Allsvenskan, on loan from Sarpsborg 08

== Career ==
He is a son of former Molde and Aalesund player Bjarte Skuseth. Growing up in Molde FK's academy, Nikolai Skuseth won the 2021 and 2022 Norwegian Youth Cup. In 2023 he was on trial, but rejected a transfer offer from the academy of S.P.A.L.

Nikolai Skuseth made his debut for Molde's B team in 2021 and played there until 2023, also making his youth international debut the same year for Norway U20. In the summer of 2023 he started his senior career in Ranheim. He was sold to Sarpsborg 08 one year later.

He was praised by local press for his Eliteserien debut, but his first period in the club was later described by the same newspaper as "heavy". He was loaned out to second-tier club Aalesunds FK in 2025. They eventually won promotion to the 2026 Eliteserien via playoff.

His second loan was to Eliteserien competitors Kristiansund BK, with an option to buy, but he did not start any matches in two months, and his third loan was a move abroad, to Allsvenskan team Degerfors IF. Here he was described by local press as a "stalwart" from day one.
