= Justin Salmon =

Liberian footballer

Personal information
- Date of birth: 25 January 1999 (age 27)
- Place of birth: Stockholm, Sweden
- Height: 6 ft 0 in (1.84 m)
- Position: Midfielder

Youth career
- IF Brommapojkarna

Senior career*
Years	Team	Apps	(Gls)
2017–2018	Eskilstuna City FK	40	(9)
2019–2020	Karlslunds IF HFK	39	(5)
2020–2021	Västerås SK	16	(1)
2021–2023	Degerfors IF	50	(2)
2024–2025	Egersund	40	(9)
2025–2026	Odd	7	(0)

International career^{‡}
2021–	Liberia	7	(0)
- * Club domestic league appearances and goals as of 24 March 2026 ‡ National team caps and goals as of 17:56, 28 March 2023 (UTC)

Justin Salmon (born 25 January 1999) is a professional footballer who currently is a free agent. Born in Sweden, he plays for the Liberia national team.

== Club career ==
On 27 March 2024, Salmon signed a two-year contract with Egersund in Norwegian second tier.¨

After a year-and-a-half at Egersund, Salmon moved to fellow 1. divisjon side Odd, on a contract that ran through 2026.

== International career ==
Salmon was born in Sweden to a Liberian father and Swedish mother. He was called up to represent the Liberia national team in August 2021.

== Career statistics ==
=== International ===
As of match played 28 March 2023

Appearances and goals by national team and year
National team	Year	Apps	Goals
Liberia	2021	2	0
Liberia	2022	4	0
Liberia	2023	1	0
Total		7	0
