= Tromsdalen UIL =

Norwegian sports club

- Full name: Tromsdalen Ungdoms- og Idrettslag
- Nickname: TUIL
- Founded: 1938; 88 years ago
- Ground: TUIL Arena
- Capacity: 3,000
- Chairman: Aslak Sokki
- Head coach: Alexander Samuelsen
- League: 2. divisjon
- 2026: 2. divisjon group 2, 8th of 14
- Website: https://www.tuilfotball.no/
Home colours	Away colours

Tromsdalen UIL is a Norwegian sports club founded in 1938, from Tromsdalen in the municipality of Tromsø. It has sections for football, athletics, skiing and gymnastics.

The men's football team plays in 2. divisjon, the third level in Norwegian football. Their home games are played at TUIL Arena, which seats 3,000 spectators. Their colors are red and blue.

== Football ==
The team was promoted to the 1. divisjon in 2003, but was relegated after one season. The club was reintroduced to the second highest flight of Norwegian football, which in the meantime had changed its name to Adeccoligaen, in 2005. After a poor start to the 2006 season, Tromsdalen was in the relegation zone for most of the season. But a very good ending of the season, beating many top clubs, Tromsdalen survived the drop and played in 1. divisjon in the 2007 season as well. However, they were relegated to 2. divisjon in 2007. The stay there wasn't long; Tromsdalen finished champion in Fourth Group of 2. divisjon in 2008 and returned to 1. divisjon for the 2009 season. After two seasons in 1. divisjon, Tromsdalen was relegated to the 2. divisjon.

In 2011, Tromsdalen scored 105 goals in the 2. divisjon, which is a Norwegian record, and again won promotion to the second tier.

In 2007 Tromsdalen's women's team played in the women's first division.

During the 2019 season, Tromsdalen had to play their home games at Alfheim Stadion because their floodlights were not approved by the Football Association of Norway.

=== Recent history ===
Season		Pos.	Pl.	W	D	L	GS	GA	P	Cup	Notes
2003	2. divisjon	↑ 1	26	21	2	3	75	21	65	Third round	Promoted to the 1. divisjon
2004	1. divisjon	↓ 16	30	3	4	23	29	84	13	Second round	Relegated to the 2. divisjon
2005	2. divisjon	↑ 1	26	17	4	5	64	34	55	Second round	Promoted to the 1. divisjon
2006	1. divisjon	12	30	8	11	11	48	52	35	Second round	
2007	1. divisjon	↓ 14	30	7	8	15	37	56	29	Third round	Relegated to the 2. divisjon
2008	2. divisjon	↑ 1	26	17	5	4	64	24	56	Second round	Promoted to the 1. divisjon
2009	1. divisjon	12	30	11	6	13	38	54	39	Second round	
2010	1. divisjon	↓ 14	28	8	4	16	33	50	28	Third round	Relegated to the 2. divisjon
2011	2. divisjon	↑ 1	26	20	2	4	105	28	62	Second round	Promoted to the 1. divisjon
2012	1. divisjon	↓ 13	30	10	5	15	51	62	35	Third round	Relegated to the 2. divisjon
2013	2. divisjon	↑ 1	26	19	5	2	70	31	62	Second round	Promoted to the 1. divisjon
2014	1. divisjon	↓14	30	8	7	15	44	56	31	Fourth round	Relegated to the 2. divisjon
2015	2. divisjon	2	26	18	3	5	71	27	57	Fourth round	
2016	2. divisjon	↑ 1	26	21	4	1	71	19	67	Third round	Promoted to the 1. divisjon
2017	1. divisjon	9	30	9	10	11	43	43	37	Second round	
2018	1. divisjon	7	30	12	7	11	43	47	43	Second round	
2019	1. divisjon	↓16	30	3	4	23	36	79	13	Fourth round	Relegated to the 2. divisjon
2020	2. divisjon	7	18	6	4	8	31	24	22	Cancelled	
2021	2. divisjon	4	26	13	6	7	52	34	45	First round	
2022	2. divisjon	8	26	10	5	11	28	35	35	Third round	
2023	2. divisjon	2	26	15	5	6	56	29	50	Second round	
2024	2. divisjon	2	26	18	3	5	73	44	57	Third round	
2025	2. divisjon	4	26	14	5	7	54	37	47	Third round	
2026	2. divisjon	8	26	12	2	12	48	44	38	Fourth round	

== Current squad ==
As of 1 September 2026.

Note: Flags indicate national team as defined under FIFA eligibility rules; some limited exceptions apply. Players may hold more than one non-FIFA nationality.

No.	Pos.	Nation	Player
1	GK	CAN	Simon Thomas
3	DF	NOR	Lasse Nilsen
4	DF	NOR	Sondre Laugsand
5	MF	NOR	Tobias Hafstad
6	DF	NOR	Johannes Elvebu
7	MF	NOR	Kent Swaleh
8	MF	NOR	Elias Skogvoll
9	FW	NOR	Sondre Halvorsen
10	FW	NOR	Einar Hauglann Ness
11	MF	NOR	Mads Bådsvik
12	GK	NOR	Thomas Kristiansen
14	DF	NOR	Morten Lysakerrud

No.	Pos.	Nation	Player
16	MF	NOR	Didrik Hafstad
17	MF	NOR	Magnus Kiperberg Mehl
18	DF	NOR	Ola Holm Jacobsen
19	MF	NOR	Isak Adolfsen
20	DF	NOR	Iver Koht Selnes
21	DF	NOR	Ruben Kristiansen
22	MF	NOR	Asger Eliassen
23	MF	NOR	Casper Kleiva
24	FW	NOR	Brage Dyrkoren
31	MF	NOR	Ola Kristoffersen
32	MF	NOR	Peder Meen Johansen
92	GK	NOR	Marius Tollefsen

=== Out on loan ===
Note: Flags indicate national team as defined under FIFA eligibility rules; some limited exceptions apply. Players may hold more than one non-FIFA nationality.

No.	Pos.	Nation	Player
28	FW	NOR	Aron Tov Weisser Svendsen (at IF Fløya until 31 December 2026)
