= 2026 Tromsø IL season =

Tromsø
2026 season
- Chairman: Stig Bjørklund
- Head coach: Jørgen Vik
- Stadium: Romssa Arena
- Eliteserien: 3rd
- 2025–26 Norwegian Cup: Fourth Round
- 2026–27 Norwegian Cup: Third Round
- UEFA Europa League: Second qualifying round
- UEFA Conference League: Play-off round
- Top goalscorer: League: Heine Åsen Larsen (10); All: Heine Åsen Larsen (14)
- Highest home attendance: 6,027 (vs. Rosenborg, Eliteserien, 6 April 2026)
- Lowest home attendance: 4,220 (vs. CFR Cluj, UEFA Conference League, 13 August 2026)
- Average home league attendance: 5,072
- Biggest win: 5–0 vs CFR Cluj (A); UEFA Conference League, 6 August 2026; 5–0 vs Ulfstind (A); 2026–27 Norwegian Cup, 22 August 2026
- Biggest defeat: 0–5 vs Brann (H); Eliteserien, 29 April 2026; 0–5 vs Bodø/Glimt (A); Eliteserien, 16 May 2026
- All statistics correct as of 29 September 2026.

The 2026 season was Tromsø IL's 106th season in existence and the club's sixth consecutive season in the top flight of Norwegian football. In addition to the domestic league, Tromsø IL participated in both the 2025–26 and 2026–27 editions of the Norwegian Cup, as well as the qualifying stages for the 2026–27 edition of the UEFA Europa League and the 2026–27 edition of the UEFA Conference League after qualifying through their third place in the 2025 Eliteserien.

== Coaching team ==
As of 1 January 2026

| Position | Name |
|---|---|
| Head coach | (Norway) Jørgen Vik |
| Assistant coaches | (Norway) Ola Rismo, (Norway) Marius Jacobsen, (Norway) Lars Gunnar Johnsen |
| Goalkeeping coach | (Norway) Eirik Sørensen |
| Fitness coach | (Norway) Sigurd Pedersen |

== Squad ==
As of 29 September 2026

| No. | Player | Nationality | Date of birth (age) | Signed from | Signed in | Contract ends | Apps | Goals |
Goalkeepers
| 1 | Jakob Haugaard | (Denmark) | 1 May 1992 (aged 34) | (Sweden) AIK | 2022 | 2026 | 150 | 0 |
| 12 | Ole Kristian Lauvli | (Norway) | 13 May 1994 (aged 32) | (Norway) Raufoss | 2025 | 2026 | 6 | 0 |
| 32 | Øystein Norheim | (Norway) | 6 April 2008 (aged 18) | (Norway) Finnsnes | 2026 | Undisclosed | 0 | 0 |
Defenders
| 3 | Mathias Tønnessen | (Norway) | 22 November 2003 (aged 22) | (Norway) KFUM Oslo | 2026 | 2030 | 11 | 0 |
| 4 | Vetle Skjærvik | (Norway) | 15 September 2000 (aged 26) | (Norway) Lillestrøm | 2024 | 2027 | 86 | 4 |
| 16 | Benjamin Myrvold | (Norway) | 17 June 2010 (aged 16) | (Norway) Vindbjart | 2026 | 2029 | 1 | 0 |
| 21 | Leon Hien | (Sweden) | 31 July 2001 (aged 25) | (Sweden) Djurgårdens IF | 2026 | 2026 | 9 | 2 |
| 24 | Vince Osuji | (Nigeria) | 6 April 2006 (aged 20) | (Belgium) Club Brugge | 2026 | Undisclosed | 5 | 0 |
| 25 | Casper Øyvann | (Norway) | 7 December 1999 (aged 26) | (Norway) Molde | 2026 | 2028 | 55 | 2 |
| 29 | Alexander Warneryd | (Sweden) | 21 August 2005 (aged 21) | (Sweden) Västerås SK | 2025 | 2029 | 40 | 6 |
| 30 | Isak Vådebu | (Norway) | 10 August 2003 (aged 23) | (Norway) Tromsdalen | 2023 | 2029 | 54 | 2 |
| 33 | Musa Jatta | (The Gambia) | 20 December 2004 (aged 21) | (Sweden) Öster | 2026 | 2030 | 3 | 0 |
Midfielders
| 5 | David Edvardsson | (Sweden) | 5 March 2002 (aged 24) | (Sweden) Malmö FF | 2024 | Undisclosed | 69 | 5 |
| 8 | Jesper Grundt | (Norway) | 20 October 2002 (aged 23) | (Norway) Kongsvinger | 2026 | 2029 | 12 | 0 |
| 10 | Troy Nyhammer | (Norway) | 19 August 2006 (aged 20) | (Norway) Haugesund | 2026 | 2029 | 26 | 4 |
| 11 | Ruben Yttergård Jenssen (captain) | (Norway) | 4 May 1988 (aged 38) | (Norway) Brann | 2020 | 2026 | 427 | 20 |
| 14 | Sigurd Prestmo | (Norway) | 6 October 2006 (aged 19) | (Norway) Ranheim | 2025 | 2028 | 9 | 0 |
| 17 | Isak Dahlqvist | (Sweden) | 25 September 2001 (aged 25) | (Austria) Blau-Weiß Linz | 2026 | 2029 | 12 | 3 |
| 19 | Aleksander Lilletun Elvebu | (Norway) | 22 March 2009 (aged 17) | (Norway) Academy | 2025 | 2028 | 3 | 0 |
| 22 | Heine Åsen Larsen | (Norway) | 9 July 2002 (aged 24) | (Norway) Egersund | 2024 | 2029 | 46 | 14 |
| 27 | Mads Mikkelsen | (Norway) | 28 August 2008 (aged 18) | (Norway) Academy | 2024 | 2028 | 7 | 0 |
| 37 | Sander Innvær | (Norway) | 11 October 2004 (aged 21) | (Norway) Haugesund | 2025 | 2029 | 25 | 3 |
| 70 | Morten Bjørlo | (Norway) | 4 October 1995 (aged 30) | (Turkey) Konyaspor | 2026 | 2029 | 4 | 1 |
Forwards
| 7 | Lars Olden Larsen | (Norway) | 17 September 1998 (aged 28) | (Netherlands) NEC | 2025 | 2027 | 41 | 4 |
| 9 | Daniel Braut | (Norway) | 1 May 2005 (aged 21) | (Norway) Sandnes Ulf | 2025 | 2028 | 55 | 13 |
| 15 | Vegard Erlien | (Norway) | 24 June 1998 (aged 28) | (Spain) Real Valladolid | 2026 | 2029 | 95 | 39 |
| 18 | Nikolai Hristov | (Norway) | 24 May 2000 (aged 26) | (Norway) Strømmen | 2026 | 2029 | 2 | 0 |

=== New contracts ===
| Date | Pos. | No. | Player | Until | Ref. |
|---|---|---|---|---|---|
| 6 February 2026 | MF | 6 | (Norway) Jens Hjertø-Dahl | 2029 | |
| 15 September 2026 | MF | 22 | (Norway) Heine Åsen Larsen | 2029 | |

== Transfers ==
=== In ===
| Date | Pos. | No. | Player | From | Fee | Ref. |
|---|---|---|---|---|---|---|
| 1 January 2026 | FW | 7 | (Norway) Lars Olden Larsen | (Netherlands) NEC | Undisclosed | |
| 1 January 2026 | MF | 8 | (Norway) Jesper Grundt | (Norway) Kongsvinger | 10,000,000 NOK (Note: Fee may eventually rise to 15,000,000 NOK.) | |
| 1 January 2026 | MF | 10 | (Norway) Troy Nyhammer | (Norway) Haugesund | 10,000,000 NOK (Note: Fee may eventually rise to 14,000,000 NOK.) | |
| 1 January 2026 | GK | 32 | (Mauritania) Abderrahmane Sarr | (Mauritania) Nouakchott Kings | Undisclosed | |
| 2 January 2026 | DF | 3 | (Norway) Mathias Tønnessen | (Norway) KFUM Oslo | 13,000,000 NOK (Note: Fee may eventually rise to 15,000,000 NOK.) | |
| 5 February 2026 | FW | 15 | (Sweden) Viktor Ekblom | (Sweden) Falkenbergs FF | Undisclosed | |
| 20 June 2026 | DF | 16 | (Norway) Benjamin Myrvold | (Norway) Vindbjart | Undisclosed | |
| 22 June 2026 | MF | 17 | (Sweden) Isak Dahlqvist | (Austria) Blau-Weiß Linz | Free transfer | |
| 28 June 2026 | DF | 25 | (Norway) Casper Øyvann | (Norway) Molde | Undisclosed | |
| 19 August 2026 | DF | 24 | (Nigeria) Vince Osuji | (Belgium) Club Brugge | Undisclosed | |
| 1 September 2026 | MF | 70 | (Norway) Morten Bjørlo | (Turkey) Konyaspor | Free Transfer | |
| 2 September 2026 | FW | 15 | (Norway) Vegard Erlien | (Spain) Real Valladolid | Free Transfer | |
| 2 September 2026 | FW | 18 | (Norway) Nikolai Hristov | (Norway) Strømmen | 1,100,000 NOK | |
| 2 September 2026 | GK | 32 | (Norway) Øystein Norheim | (Norway) Finnsnes | Undisclosed | |
| 2 September 2026 | DF | 33 | (The Gambia) Musa Jatta | (Sweden) Öster | 10,000,000 NOK (Note: Fee may eventually rise to 14,000,000 NOK.) | |

=== Out ===
| Date | Pos. | No. | Player | To | Fee | Ref. |
|---|---|---|---|---|---|---|
| 31 December 2025 | DF | 5 | (Norway) Anders Jenssen | Retired | | |
| 31 December 2025 | GK | 12 | (Canada) Simon Thomas | (Norway) Tromsdalen | Released | |
| 31 December 2025 | FW | 15 | (Norway) Vegard Erlien | (Spain) Real Valladolid | Released | |
| 31 December 2025 | DF | 16 | (Finland) Miika Koskela | (Norway) Haugesund | Undisclosed (Note: Koskela's transfer was part of the deal that brought Troy Nyhammer to Tromsø.) | |
| 31 December 2025 | DF | 24 | (Norway) Ruben Kristiansen | (Norway) Tromsdalen | Released | |
| 31 December 2025 | GK | 32 | (Norway) Mats Trige | (Norway) Lyn | Released | |
| 31 December 2025 | DF | – | (Norway) Tobias Norbye | (Norway) Alta | Released | |
| 1 January 2026 | DF | 26 | (Norway) Isak Vik | (Norway) Lyn | Undisclosed | |
| 19 January 2026 | MF | 8 | (Norway) Kent-Are Antonsen | (Norway) Strømsgodset | Released | |
| 29 January 2026 | FW | 36 | (Norway) Johannes Lilletun Elvebu | (Norway) Tromsdalen | Released | |
| 19 June 2026 | DF | 25 | (The Gambia) Abubacarr Sedi Kinteh | (Saudi Arabia) Al-Ahli | 70,000,000 NOK | |
| 23 June 2026 | DF | 24 | (Norway) Jens Husebø | (Norway) Start | 2,000,000 NOK | |
| 31 July 2026 | DF | 21 | (Norway) Tobias Guddal | (Czech Republic) Sparta Prague | 60,000,000 NOK | |
| 7 August 2026 | MF | 6 | (Norway) Jens Hjertø-Dahl | (England) Hull City | £8,000,000 | |
| 25 August 2026 | FW | – | (Denmark) Frederik Christensen | (Denmark) Hobro | Undisclosed | |
| 29 August 2026 | DF | 2 | (Norway) Leo Cornic | (Norway) Brann | Undisclosed | |

=== Loans in ===
| Date | Pos. | No. | Player | To | Date until | Ref. |
|---|---|---|---|---|---|---|
| 5 August 2026 | DF | 21 | (Sweden) Leon Hien | (Sweden) Djurgårdens IF | 31 December 2026 | |

=== Loans out ===
| Date | Pos. | No. | Player | To | Date until | Ref. |
|---|---|---|---|---|---|---|
| 17 June 2025 | FW | – | (Denmark) Frederik Christensen | (Germany) FC Ingolstadt | 30 June 2026 | |
| 30 January 2026 | FW | – | (Norway) Sean Nilsen-Modebe | (Norway) Hødd | 24 July 2026 (Note: On 24 July, Nilsen-Modebe was recalled from his loan at Hødd.) | |
| 31 January 2026 | FW | 9 | (Portugal) Ieltsin Camões | (Egypt) Al Ahly | 30 June 2026 | |
| 12 February 2026 | DF | – | (Romania) Filip Oprea | (Norway) Åsane | End of season | |
| 23 February 2026 | MF | 14 | (Norway) Sigurd Prestmo | (Norway) Moss | 18 May 2026 (Note: On 18 May, Prestmo was recalled from his loan at Moss.) | |
| 1 June 2026 | MF | 14 | (Norway) Sigurd Prestmo | (Norway) Moss | 22 June 2026 (Note: On 22 June, Prestmo was recalled from his loan at Moss.) | |
| 4 June 2026 | MF | 92 | (Norway) Johan Solstad-Nøis | (Norway) Lyn | End of season | |
| 1 August 2026 | FW | – | (Norway) Sean Nilsen-Modebe | (Norway) Lørenskog | End of season | |
| 31 August 2026 | FW | 15 | (Sweden) Viktor Ekblom | (Sweden) Örgryte IS | End of season | |
| 2 September 2026 | GK | 32 | (Mauritania) Abderrahmane Sarr | (Norway) Raufoss | End of season | |
| 4 September 2026 | FW | 20 | (Cape Verde) Ieltsin Camões | (Poland) Śląsk Wrocław | 30 June 2027 | |

== Pre-season and friendlies ==
On 19 December 2025, Tromsø announced they would attend The Atlantic Cup in Portugal in late January, where they would play Danish side Randers and Swedish side Mjällby. On the same day, they announced a return to Spain during pre-season for matches against Viking and Lillestrøm.

| 18 January 2026 Friendly | Lyn | 0–2 | Tromsø | Lillestrøm |
| 20:00 CET (UTC+1) | | Report | Braut 57'; Nyhammer 59' | Stadium: LSK-Hallen |

| 25 January 2026 Atlantic Cup | Randers (Denmark) | 3–2 | (Norway) Tromsø | Faro-Loulé, Portugal |
| 19:30 WET (UTC+0) | Mo. Toure 18'; Olsen 26'; Mu. Toure 83' | Report | Camões 90'; Grundt 90+3' | Stadium: Estádio Algarve; Referee: Pedro Paulo |

| 30 January 2026 Atlantic Cup | Tromsø (Norway) | 1–0 | (Sweden) Mjällby | Faro-Loulé, Portugal |
| 14:00 WET (UTC+0) | Olden Larsen 78' | Report | | Stadium: Estádio Algarve |

| 6 February 2026 Friendly | Tromsø | 1–1 | Tromsdalen | Tromsø |
| 14:00 CET (UTC+1) | Edvardsson 40' | Report | Ness 38' | Stadium: Romssa Arena |

| 13 February 2026 Friendly | Tromsø | 1–0 | Bryne | Tromsø |
| 12:30 CET (UTC+1) | Hjertø-Dahl 36' (pen.) | Report | | Stadium: Romssa Arena |

| 20 February 2026 Friendly | Tromsø | 1–1 | Viking | San Pedro Alcántara, Spain |
| 16:00 CET (UTC+1) | Vådebu 56' | Report | Stensness 18' | Stadium: Marbella Football Center |

| 21 February 2026 Friendly | Vålerenga | 3–2 | Tromsø | San Pedro Alcántara, Spain |
| 13:00 CET (UTC+1) | Bjørdal 11'; Obasi 58'; Rajkovic 61' | Report | Grundt 43'; Innvær 48' | Stadium: Marbella Football Center |

| 27 February 2026 Friendly | Lillestrøm | 0–0 | Tromsø | San Pedro Alcántara, Spain |
| 17:00 CET (UTC+1) | | Report | | Stadium: Marbella Football Center |

| 27 March 2026 Friendly | Tromsø | 1–0 | Start | Oslo |
| 15:15 CET (UTC+1) | Åsen Larsen 56' | Report | | Stadium: Nordre Åsen Idrettspark |

| 25 June 2026 Friendly | Tromsø (Norway) | 4–1 | (Sweden) Örgryte IS | Helsingør, Denmark |
| 15:00 CEST (UTC+2) | Hjertø-Dahl 43' (pen.); Olden Larsen 63'; Camões 77'; Mikkelsen 90+2' | Report | 56' | Stadium: Helsingør Ny Stadion |

| 4 July 2026 Friendly | Tromsø | 4–0 | Sandefjord | Oslo |
| 15:00 CEST (UTC+2) | Hjertø-Dahl 23'; Camões 56'; Dahlqvist 69'; Nyhammer 87' | | | Stadium: Grefsen Stadion |

== Competitions ==
=== Overview ===
| Competition | First match | Last match | Starting round | Final position | Record | | | | | | | |
| Competition | First match | Last match | Starting round | Final position | Pld | W | D | L | GF | GA | GD | Win % |
|---|---|---|---|---|---|---|---|---|---|---|---|---|
| Eliteserien | 15 March 2026 | 13 December 2026 | Matchday 1 | | 21 | 11 | 5 | 5 | 40 | 29 | +11 | 52.38 |
| 2025–26 Norwegian Cup | See 2025 season | 7 March 2026 | See 2025 season | Fourth round | 1 | 0 | 0 | 1 | 1 | 2 | −1 | 0.00 |
| 2026–27 Norwegian Cup | 22 August 2026 | | First round | | 2 | 2 | 0 | 0 | 7 | 1 | +6 | 100.00 |
| UEFA Europa League | 23 July 2026 | 30 July 2026 | Second qualifying round | Second qualifying round | 2 | 0 | 0 | 2 | 1 | 4 | −3 | 0.00 |
| UEFA Conference League | 6 August 2026 | 27 August 2026 | Third qualifying round | Play-off round | 4 | 2 | 1 | 1 | 7 | 5 | +2 | 50.00 |
| Total | | | | | 30 | 15 | 6 | 9 | 56 | 41 | +15 | 50.00 |

Last updated: 29 September 2026
Source: Soccerway

=== Eliteserien ===
==== League table ====
| Pos | Team | Pld | W | D | L | GF | GA | GD | Pts | Qualification or relegation |
|---|---|---|---|---|---|---|---|---|---|---|
| 4 | Lillestrøm | 26 | 14 | 3 | 9 | 39 | 35 | +4 | 45 | Qualification for the Conference League second qualifying round |
| 5 | Molde | 26 | 13 | 5 | 8 | 64 | 44 | +20 | 44 | |
| 6 | Tromsø | 26 | 11 | 7 | 8 | 43 | 40 | +3 | 40 | |
| 7 | Brann | 26 | 10 | 3 | 13 | 47 | 44 | +3 | 33 | |
| 8 | Vålerenga | 26 | 9 | 5 | 12 | 43 | 47 | −4 | 32 | |

Updated to match(es) played on 9 November 2026. Source: Football Association of Norway (in Norwegian)
Rules for classification: 1) Points; 2) Goal difference; 3) Goals scored; 4) Head-to-head points; 5) Head-to-head goal difference; 6) Head-to-head goals scored.

==== Results by round ====
| Round | 1 | 2 | 3 | 4 | 5 | 6 | 7 | 8 | 9 | 10 | 11 | 12 | 13 | 14 | 15 | 16 | 17 | 18 | 19 | 20 | 21 | 22 | 23 | 24 | 25 | 26 | 27 | 28 | 29 | 30 |
|---|---|---|---|---|---|---|---|---|---|---|---|---|---|---|---|---|---|---|---|---|---|---|---|---|---|---|---|---|---|---|
| Ground | H | A | H | H | A | H | A | H | A | H | A | A | H | A | H | A | H | A | H | A | A | H | A | H | A | H | H | A | H | A |
| Result | W | W | W | W | W | W | D | W | L | D | D | | W | W | D | W | L | L | D | L | L | W | | | | | | | | |
| Position | 1 | 1 | 1 | 1 | 1 | 1 | 1 | 1 | 2 | 2 | 2 | | 2 | 2 | 3 | 3 | 3 | 3 | 3 | 3 | 4 | 3 | | | | | | | | |

Source: NIFS
A = Away; H = Home; W = Win; D = Draw; L = Loss

==== Matches ====
The league fixtures were announced on 19 December 2025.

Win Draw Loss Fixtures

| 15 March 2026 1 | Tromsø | 4–0 | Fredrikstad | Tromsø |
| 19:15 CET (UTC+1) | Åsen Larsen 4'; Hjertø-Dahl 64', 73', 86' | Report | Fredriksen (yellow card) 21' | Stadium: Romssa Arena; Attendance: 4,255; Referee: Daniel Higraff |

| 22 March 2026 2 | Brann | 1–2 | Tromsø | Bergen |
| 17:00 CET (UTC+1) | Horn Myhre 43'; Holm (yellow card) 61' | Report | Warneryd 10'; Guddal (yellow card) 38'; Braut 47'; Olden Larsen (yellow card) 54'; Nyhammer (yellow card) 90+2' | Stadium: Brann Stadion; Attendance: 14,569; Referee: Rohit Saggi |

| 6 April 2026 3 | Tromsø | 2–0 | Rosenborg | Tromsø |
| 19:15 CEST (UTC+2) | Hjertø-Dahl 27'; Åsen Larsen 48' | Report | Wahlstedt (yellow card) 21'; Svensson (yellow card) 35'; M. Ceïde (yellow card) 84' | Stadium: Romssa Arena; Attendance: 6,027; Referee: Ola Hobber Nilsen |

| 11 April 2026 4 | Tromsø | 2–0 | Kristiansund | Tromsø |
| 16:00 CEST (UTC+2) | Olden Larsen 60'; Braut 69' | Report | Haugen (yellow card) 40'; Alvheim (yellow card) 59' | Stadium: Romssa Arena; Attendance: 5,532; Referee: Stian Røvig Sletner |

| 15 April 2026 15 | Tromsø | 0–0 | Lillestrøm | Tromsø |
| 19:00 CEST (UTC+2) | Cornic (yellow card) 74' | Report | Ibrahimaj (yellow card) 26'; Paintsil (yellow card) 74' | Stadium: Romssa Arena; Attendance: 5,256; Referee: Kristoffer Hagenes |
Note: Fixture was initially scheduled on 26 July, but was moved because of Tromsø's involvement in the 2026–27 UEFA Europa League qualifying.

| 19 April 2026 5 | Sarpsborg 08 | 0–1 | Tromsø | Sarpsborg |
| 17:00 CEST (UTC+2) | | Report | Cornic (yellow card) 38'; Warneryd 59' | Stadium: Sarpsborg Stadion; Attendance: 4,227; Referee: Svein Tore Sinnes |

| 26 April 2026 6 | Tromsø | 3–1 | Sandefjord | Tromsø |
| 17:00 CEST (UTC+2) | Åsen Larsen 16'; Skjærvik 28'; Nyhammer 57' | Report | Patoulidis 48' | Stadium: Romssa Arena; Attendance: 4,821; Referee: Marius Waskaas Lien |

| 29 April 2026 17 | Tromsø | 0–5 | Brann | Tromsø |
| 19:00 CEST (UTC+2) | Åsen Larsen (yellow card) 27'; Edvardsson (yellow card) 70'; Olden Larsen (yellow card) 80' | Report | Ingason 19', 22', 37'; Mathisen 50'; Sørensen (yellow card) 87'; Haaland 90+3' | Stadium: Romssa Arena; Attendance: 5,221; Referee: Sigurd Smehus Kringstad |
Note: Fixture was initially scheduled on 9 August, but was moved because of Tromsø's involvement in the 2026–27 UEFA Europa League qualifying.

| 3 May 2026 7 | Start | 1–1 | Tromsø | Kristiansand |
| 17:00 CEST (UTC+2) | Ugland (yellow card) 23'; Segberg (yellow card) 46', (goal) 75'; Reitan (yellow card) 90+4' | Report | Hjertø-Dahl 33', (yellow card) 33'; Vådebu (yellow card) 90+2' | Stadium: Sparebanken Norge Arena; Attendance: 5,795; Referee: Jørgen Haugen |

| 10 May 2026 8 | Tromsø | 2–0 | Molde | Tromsø |
| 17:00 CEST (UTC+2) | Edvardsson (yellow card) 27'; Vådebu 81'; Warneryd (yellow card) 90+7'; Nyhammer 90+8' | Report | Posiadała (yellow card) 59'; Breivik (yellow card) 87' | Stadium: Romssa Arena; Attendance: 5,011; Referee: Kristoffer Hagenes |

| 16 May 2026 9 | Bodø/Glimt | 5–0 | Tromsø | Bodø |
| 18:00 CEST (UTC+2) | Evjen 21'; Brunstad Fet 66'; Hauge 68'; Høgh 79', 89' (pen.) | Report | Warneryd (red card) 45'; Cornic (yellow card) 59' | Stadium: Aspmyra Stadion; Attendance: 8,232; Referee: Tore Hansen |

| 25 May 2026 10 | Tromsø | 1–1 | Aalesund | Tromsø |
| 17:00 CEST (UTC+2) | Innvær 3', (yellow card) 55' | Report | Reed (yellow card) 28'; Christensen 57'; Syversen (yellow card) 82' | Stadium: Romssa Arena; Attendance: 5,249; Referee: Espen Eskås |

| 29 May 2026 11 | KFUM Oslo | 0–0 | Tromsø | Oslo |
| 19:00 CEST (UTC+2) | Grødem (yellow card) 44' | Report | Guddal (yellow card) 83' | Stadium: KFUM Arena; Attendance: 2,011; Referee: Sigurd Smehus Kringstad |

| 11 July 2026 13 | Tromsø | 4–0 | Vålerenga | Tromsø |
| 18:00 CEST (UTC+2) | Åsen Larsen 12', 45+3'; Hjertø-Dahl 22'; Edvardsson (yellow card) 74'; Nyhammer 79' | Report | Jarl (yellow card) 85' | Stadium: Romssa Arena; Attendance: 5,102; Referee: Svein Tore Sinnes |

| 18 July 2026 14 | HamKam | 1–4 | Tromsø | Hamar |
| 14:00 CEST (UTC+2) | Niang 58' | Report | Åsen Larsen 28'; Hjertø-Dahl 47'; Yttergård Jenssen 53'; Camões 90+2' | Stadium: Briskeby Stadion; Attendance: 4,705; Referee: Mischa Kellerhals |

| 2 August 2026 16 | Aalesund | 2–6 | Tromsø | Ålesund |
| 17:00 CEST (UTC+2) | Vådebu 42' (o.g.); Osenbroch 59' | Report | Tønnessen (yellow card) 7'; Edvardsson 9'; Warneryd 47', 54', 69'; Åsen Larsen 82'; Syversen 90+2' (o.g.) | Stadium: Color Line Stadion; Attendance: 4,293; Referee: Marius Hansen Grøtta |

| 16 August 2026 18 | Molde | 3–2 | Tromsø | Molde |
| 17:00 CEST (UTC+2) | Løvik (yellow card) 35'; Hestad 41' (pen.); Granaas (yellow card) 50'; Spiten-Nysæter 55'; Abdullai (yellow card) 60'; Linnes (yellow card) 88'; Koné-Doherty 90+2' | Report | Åsen Larsen 53', (yellow card) 84'; Camões 90+8' | Stadium: Aker Stadion; Attendance: 5,525; Referee: Espen Eskås |

| 30 August 2026 19 | Tromsø | 0–0 | Sarpsborg 08 | Tromsø |
| 17:00 CEST (UTC+2) | Åsen Larsen (yellow card) 58'; Hien (yellow card) 74' | Report | Niyukuri (yellow card) 82' | Stadium: Romssa Arena; Referee: Svein Tore Sinnes |

| 6 September 2026 20 | Kristiansund | 2–0 | Tromsø | Kristiansund |
| 19:15 CEST (UTC+2) | Alvheim 14', 77'; Elvius (yellow card) 25' | Report | Osuji (yellow card) 22'; Jatta (yellow card) 50'; Innvær (yellow card) 54' | Stadium: Nordmøre Stadion; Attendance: 2,733; Referee: Mohammad Usman Aslam |

| 12 September 2026 21 | Rosenborg | 5–3 | Tromsø | Trondheim |
| 18:00 CEST (UTC+2) | Selnæs 3'; Chiakha 5'; Sahsah 34', 47'; Fonn Witry 43'; Wahlstedt (yellow card) 73'; Soboczynski (yellow card) 86' | Report | Erlien (yellow card) 42'; Edvardsson (yellow card) 50'; Nyhammer 71'; Åsen Larsen 75' (pen.); Selnæs 77' (o.g.); Osuji (yellow card) 90+3' | Stadium: Lerkendal Stadion; Attendance: 16,155; Referee: Tore Hansen |

| 20 September 2026 22 | Tromsø | 3–2 | HamKam | Tromsø |
| 17:00 CEST (UTC+2) | Bjørlo 44'; Åsen Larsen 60'; Erlien 85' | Report | Ofkir 41'; Strand-Nilsen (yellow card) 77'; Skjærvik 87' (o.g.) | Stadium: Romssa Arena; Attendance: 4,244; Referee: Mathias Støfringshaug |

| 11 October 2026 23 | Fredrikstad | v | Tromsø | Fredrikstad |
| 14:30 CEST (UTC+2) | | Report | | Stadium: Fredrikstad Stadion |

| 18 October 2026 24 | Tromsø | v | KFUM Oslo | Tromsø |
| 19:15 CEST (UTC+2) | | Report | | Stadium: Romssa Arena |

| 25 October 2026 12 | Viking | v | Tromsø | Stavanger |
| 14:30 CET (UTC+1) | | Report | | Stadium: Viking Stadion |

| 1 November 2026 25 | Vålerenga | v | Tromsø | Oslo |
| 19:15 CET (UTC+1) | | Report | | Stadium: Intility Arena |

| 8 November 2026 26 | Tromsø | v | Bodø/Glimt | Tromsø |
| 14:30 CET (UTC+1) | | Report | | Stadium: Romssa Arena |

| 21 November 2026 27 | Tromsø | v | Viking | Tromsø |
| 14:00 CET (UTC+1) | | Report | | Stadium: Romssa Arena |

| 29 November 2026 28 | Sandefjord | v | Tromsø | Sandefjord |
| 17:00 CET (UTC+1) | | Report | | Stadium: Sandefjord Arena |

| 6 December 2026 29 | Tromsø | v | Start | Tromsø |
| 17:00 CET (UTC+1) | | Report | | Stadium: Romssa Arena |

| 13 December 2026 30 | Lillestrøm | v | Tromsø | Lillestrøm |
| 17:00 CET (UTC+1) | | Report | | Stadium: Åråsen Stadion |

=== Norwegian Cup ===
==== 2025–26 ====
The previous round took place during the 2025 season.

Last season Tromsø progressed from the third round after beating Kristiansund. The fourth round draw saw Tromsø play Eliteserien side KFUM Oslo away.

Win Draw Loss Fixtures

| 7 March 2026 Fourth round | KFUM Oslo | 2–1 | Tromsø | Oslo |
| 14:00 CET (UTC+1) | Haltvik 16', 57', (yellow card) 90'; Hestnes (yellow card) 31' | Report | Braut 33' | Stadium: KFUM Arena; Attendance: 1,154; Referee: Tore Hansen |

==== 2026–27 ====
As an Eliteserien side, Tromsø entered the 2026–27 Norwegian Cup in the first round, and were pitted against Norwegian Third Division club Ulfstind. For the second round, Tromsø was again pitted against a Norwegian Third Division side, this time Alta. Ahead of the third round, Tromsø were drawn against Norwegian First Division side Haugesund.

Win Draw Loss Fixtures

| 22 August 2026 First round | Ulfstind | 0–5 | Tromsø | Tromsø |
| 16:00 CEST (UTC+2) | Soltun (yellow card) 44' | Report | Evensen-Jensen 13', 41'; Innvær 25', 36'; Hien 86' | Stadium: Tønsnes kunstgress Attendance: 380; Referee: Magnus Henriksen Tjelle |

| 16 September 2026 Second round | Alta | 1–2 | Tromsø | Alta |
| 18:00 CEST (UTC+2) | Holsbø 11'; Ettouati (yellow card) 62' | Report | Åsen Larsen 35'; Erlien 88' | Stadium: Finnmarkshallen; Referee: Herman Skurdal Holthe |

| 28 October 2026 Third round | Tromsø | 1–2 | Haugesund | Tromsø |
| 19:00 CET (UTC+1) | | Report | | Stadium: Romssa Arena |

=== UEFA Europa League ===
==== Second qualifying round ====
As the third-placed team in last season's Eliteserien, Tromsø entered the UEFA Europa League in the second qualifying round, and would go on to be drawn against Czech side Viktoria Plzeň. However, after the exclusion of Karviná from all European competitions, and the subsequent adjustment of the Czech clubs' access places, Hradec Králové replaced Viktoria Plzeň as Tromsø's opponent in the second qualifying round.

Win Draw Loss Fixtures

| 23 July 2026 First leg | Tromsø (Norway) | 0–1 | (Czech Republic) Hradec Králové | Tromsø, Norway |
| 19:00 CEST (UTC+2) | Edvardsson (yellow card) 90+2' | Report | Čech (yellow card) 46'; Zadražil (yellow card) 52'; van Buren 85' | Stadium: Romssa Arena; Attendance: 5,082; Referee: Snir Levy (Israel) |

| 30 July 2026 Second leg | Hradec Králové (Czech Republic) | 3–1 (4–1 agg.) | (Norway) Tromsø | Hradec Králové, Czech Republic |
| 19:00 CEST (UTC+2) | Uhrinčať (yellow card) 14'; van Buren 30'; Slončík 48', (yellow card) 50'; Mihálik 53'; Umar (yellow card) 85' | Report | Åsen Larsen 25'; Edvardsson (yellow card) 66' | Stadium: Malšovická aréna Attendance: 9,300; Referee: Nikola Dabanović (Montenegro) |

=== UEFA Conference League ===
==== Third qualifying round ====
As the loser of the UEFA Europa League qualifying tie against Hradec Králové, Tromsø were drawn against the winner of the tie between CFR Cluj from Romania and Armenian side Alashkert, which was won by CFR Cluj.

Win Draw Loss Fixtures

| 6 August 2026 First leg | CFR Cluj (Romania) | 0–5 | (Norway) Tromsø | Cluj-Napoca, Romania |
| 19:30 EEST (UTC+3) | Bruno Costa (yellow card) 58'; Camora (yellow card) 90' | Report | Åsen Larsen 5', 20'; Dahlqvist 27', 61', 74'; Nyhammer (yellow card) 55' | Stadium: Dr. Constantin Rădulescu Stadium; Attendance: 6,729; Referee: Patrik Kolarić (Croatia) |

| 13 August 2026 Second leg | Tromsø (Norway) | 2–1 (7–1 agg.) | (Romania) CFR Cluj | Tromsø, Norway |
| 19:00 CEST (UTC+2) | Hien 6'; Vådebu 48'; Åsen Larsen (yellow card) 70' | Report | Păun (yellow card) 49'; Korenica (yellow card) 63', (goal) 78' | Stadium: Romssa Arena; Attendance: 4,220; Referee: David Dickinson (Scotland) |

==== Play-offs round ====
Tromsø were drawn against Brighton & Hove Albion in the play-off round.

Win Draw Loss Fixtures

| 20 August 2026 First leg | Tromsø (Norway) | 0–0 | (England) Brighton & Hove Albion | Tromsø |
| 19:00 CEST (UTC+2) | | Report | Vušković (yellow card) 48'; Kadıoğlu (yellow card) 59' | Stadium: Romssa Arena; Attendance: 6,015; Referee: Edgars Maļcevs (Latvia) |

| 27 August 2026 Second leg | Brighton & Hove Albion (England) | 4–0 (4–0 agg.) | (Norway) Tromsø | Brighton and Hove |
| 20:30 BST (UTC+1) | Kostoulas 22'; De Cuyper 33'; Wieffer 38'; Boscagli 86' | Report | Warneryd (yellow card) 45' | Stadium: Falmer Stadium; Attendance: 23,981; Referee: Sander van der Eijk (Netherlands) |

== Squad statistics ==
=== Appearances and goals ===
Players with no appearances are not included on the list.

| No. | Pos | Nat | Player | Total | | Eliteserien | | 2025–26 Norwegian Cup | | 2026–27 Norwegian Cup | | Europa League | | Conference League | |
| No. | Pos | Nat | Player | Apps | Goals | Apps | Goals | Apps | Goals | Apps | Goals | Apps | Goals | Apps | Goals |
|---|---|---|---|---|---|---|---|---|---|---|---|---|---|---|---|
| 1 | GK | (Denmark) DEN | Jakob Haugaard | 29 | 0 | 21 | 0 | 1 | 0 | 1 | 0 | 2 | 0 | 4 | 0 |
| 2 | DF | (Norway) NOR | Leo Cornic | 17 | 0 | 15 | 0 | 1 | 0 | 0 | 0 | 1 | 0 | 0 | 0 |
| 3 | DF | (Norway) NOR | Mathias Tønnessen | 10 | 0 | 6 | 0 | 0 | 0 | 0 | 0 | 0 | 0 | 4 | 0 |
| 4 | DF | (Norway) NOR | Vetle Skjærvik | 22 | 1 | 16 | 1 | 1 | 0 | 0 | 0 | 2 | 0 | 3 | 0 |
| 5 | MF | (Sweden) SWE | David Edvardsson | 28 | 1 | 20 | 1 | 1 | 0 | 1 | 0 | 2 | 0 | 4 | 0 |
| 6 | MF | (Norway) NOR | Jens Hjertø-Dahl | 17 | 7 | 14 | 7 | 1 | 0 | 0 | 0 | 2 | 0 | 0 | 0 |
| 7 | FW | (Norway) NOR | Lars Olden Larsen | 28 | 1 | 20 | 1 | 1 | 0 | 1 | 0 | 2 | 0 | 4 | 0 |
| 8 | MF | (Norway) NOR | Jesper Grundt | 12 | 0 | 6 | 0 | 0 | 0 | 2 | 0 | 0 | 0 | 4 | 0 |
| 9 | FW | (Norway) NOR | Daniel Braut | 22 | 3 | 16 | 2 | 1 | 1 | 0 | 0 | 2 | 0 | 3 | 0 |
| 10 | MF | (Norway) NOR | Troy Nyhammer | 26 | 4 | 18 | 4 | 1 | 0 | 1 | 0 | 2 | 0 | 4 | 0 |
| 11 | MF | (Norway) NOR | Ruben Yttergård Jenssen | 27 | 1 | 20 | 1 | 1 | 0 | 1 | 0 | 2 | 0 | 3 | 0 |
| 12 | GK | (Norway) NOR | Ole Kristian Lauvli | 2 | 0 | 1 | 0 | 0 | 0 | 1 | 0 | 0 | 0 | 0 | 0 |
| 14 | MF | (Norway) NOR | Sigurd Prestmo | 3 | 0 | 3 | 0 | 0 | 0 | 0 | 0 | 0 | 0 | 0 | 0 |
| 15 (Note: Ekblom wore number 15 until his departure on 31 August 2026. Erlien replaced him as number 15.) | FW | (Sweden) SWE | Viktor Ekblom | 2 | 0 | 1 | 0 | 0 | 0 | 1 | 0 | 0 | 0 | 0 | 0 |
| 15 | FW | (Norway) NOR | Vegard Erlien | 4 | 2 | 3 | 1 | 0 | 0 | 1 | 1 | 0 | 0 | 0 | 0 |
| 16 | DF | (Norway) NOR | Benjamin Myrvold | 1 | 0 | 0 | 0 | 0 | 0 | 1 | 0 | 0 | 0 | 0 | 0 |
| 17 | DF | (Sweden) SWE | Isak Dahlqvist | 12 | 3 | 5 | 0 | 0 | 0 | 1 | 0 | 2 | 0 | 4 | 3 |
| 18 | FW | (Norway) NOR | Nikolai Hristov | 2 | 0 | 2 | 0 | 0 | 0 | 0 | 0 | 0 | 0 | 0 | 0 |
| 19 | MF | (Norway) NOR | Aleksander Lilletun Elvebu | 3 | 0 | 1 | 0 | 0 | 0 | 1 | 0 | 0 | 0 | 1 | 0 |
| 20 | FW | (Cape Verde) CPV | Ieltsin Camões | 11 | 2 | 4 | 2 | 0 | 0 | 1 | 0 | 2 | 0 | 4 | 0 |
| 21 (Note: Guddal wore number 21 until his departure on 31 July 2026. Hien replaced him as number 21.) | DF | (Norway) NOR | Tobias Guddal | 18 | 0 | 15 | 0 | 1 | 0 | 0 | 0 | 2 | 0 | 0 | 0 |
| 21 | DF | (Sweden) SWE | Leon Hien | 9 | 2 | 5 | 0 | 0 | 0 | 2 | 1 | 0 | 0 | 2 | 1 |
| 22 | MF | (Norway) NOR | Heine Åsen Larsen | 29 | 14 | 21 | 10 | 1 | 0 | 1 | 1 | 2 | 1 | 4 | 2 |
| 24 (Note: Husebø wore number 24 until his departure on 23 June 2026. Osuji replaced him as number 24.) | DF | (Norway) NOR | Jens Husebø | 3 | 0 | 3 | 0 | 0 | 0 | 0 | 0 | 0 | 0 | 0 | 0 |
| 24 | DF | (Nigeria) NGR | Vince Osuji | 5 | 0 | 3 | 0 | 0 | 0 | 2 | 0 | 0 | 0 | 0 | 0 |
| 25 (Note: Kinteh wore number 25 until his departure on 19 June 2026. Øyvann replaced him as number 25.) | DF | (The Gambia) GAM | Abubacarr Sedi Kinteh | 10 | 0 | 9 | 0 | 1 | 0 | 0 | 0 | 0 | 0 | 0 | 0 |
| 25 | DF | (Norway) NOR | Casper Øyvann | 2 | 0 | 1 | 0 | 0 | 0 | 0 | 0 | 0 | 0 | 1 | 0 |
| 27 | MF | (Norway) NOR | Mads Mikkelsen | 6 | 0 | 3 | 0 | 0 | 0 | 1 | 0 | 0 | 0 | 2 | 0 |
| 29 | DF | (Sweden) SWE | Alexander Warneryd | 26 | 5 | 18 | 5 | 1 | 0 | 1 | 0 | 2 | 0 | 4 | 0 |
| 30 | DF | (Norway) NOR | Isak Vådebu | 28 | 2 | 20 | 1 | 1 | 0 | 1 | 0 | 2 | 0 | 4 | 1 |
| 33 | DF | (The Gambia) GAM | Musa Jatta | 3 | 0 | 2 | 0 | 0 | 0 | 1 | 0 | 0 | 0 | 0 | 0 |
| 35 | MF | (Norway) NOR | Edvard Bjerkaas | 1 | 0 | 0 | 0 | 0 | 0 | 1 | 0 | 0 | 0 | 0 | 0 |
| 37 | MF | (Norway) NOR | Sander Innvær | 23 | 3 | 15 | 1 | 0 | 0 | 2 | 2 | 2 | 0 | 4 | 0 |
| 38 | MF | (Norway) NOR | Nicolas Haugan | 1 | 0 | 0 | 0 | 0 | 0 | 1 | 0 | 0 | 0 | 0 | 0 |
| 39 | MF | (Norway) NOR | Gard Harjo Haugsnes | 1 | 0 | 0 | 0 | 0 | 0 | 1 | 0 | 0 | 0 | 0 | 0 |
| 40 | MF | (Norway) NOR | Elias Molund | 1 | 0 | 0 | 0 | 0 | 0 | 1 | 0 | 0 | 0 | 0 | 0 |
| 41 | FW | (Norway) NOR | Adrian Evensen-Jensen | 1 | 2 | 0 | 0 | 0 | 0 | 1 | 2 | 0 | 0 | 0 | 0 |
| 70 | MF | (Norway) NOR | Morten Bjørlo | 4 | 1 | 3 | 1 | 0 | 0 | 1 | 0 | 0 | 0 | 0 | 0 |
| 92 | MF | (Norway) NOR | Johan Solstad-Nøis | 2 | 0 | 2 | 0 | 0 | 0 | 0 | 0 | 0 | 0 | 0 | 0 |
| – | DF | (Norway) NOR | Oliver Gudmund Østman Ottesen | 1 | 0 | 0 | 0 | 0 | 0 | 1 | 0 | 0 | 0 | 0 | 0 |

=== Clean sheets ===
| Rank | No. | Player | Eliteserien | 2025–26 Norwegian Cup | 2026–27 Norwegian Cup | Europa League | Conference League | Total |
|---|---|---|---|---|---|---|---|---|
| 1 | 1 | (Denmark) Jakob Haugaard | 9 | 0 | 0 | 0 | 2 | 11 |
| 2 | 12 | (Norway) Ole Kristian Lauvli | 0 | 0 | 1 | 0 | 0 | 1 |
| Total | | | 9 | 0 | 1 | 0 | 2 | 12 |

=== Disciplinary record ===
| No. | Pos. | Player | Eliteserien | | | 2025–26 Norwegian Cup | | | 2026–27 Norwegian Cup | | | Europa League | | | Conference League | | | Total | | |
| No. | Pos. | Player | Yellow card | (yellow card) (yellow-red card) | Red card | Yellow card | (yellow card) (yellow-red card) | Red card | Yellow card | (yellow card) (yellow-red card) | Red card | Yellow card | (yellow card) (yellow-red card) | Red card | Yellow card | (yellow card) (yellow-red card) | Red card | Yellow card | (yellow card) (yellow-red card) | Red card |
|---|---|---|---|---|---|---|---|---|---|---|---|---|---|---|---|---|---|---|---|---|
| 2 | DF | (Norway) Leo Cornic | 3 | 0 | 0 | 0 | 0 | 0 | 0 | 0 | 0 | 0 | 0 | 0 | 0 | 0 | 0 | 3 | 0 | 0 |
| 3 | DF | (Norway) Mathias Tønnessen | 1 | 0 | 0 | 0 | 0 | 0 | 0 | 0 | 0 | 0 | 0 | 0 | 0 | 0 | 0 | 1 | 0 | 0 |
| 5 | MF | (Sweden) David Edvardsson | 4 | 0 | 0 | 0 | 0 | 0 | 0 | 0 | 0 | 2 | 0 | 0 | 0 | 0 | 0 | 6 | 0 | 0 |
| 6 | MF | (Norway) Jens Hjertø-Dahl | 1 | 0 | 0 | 0 | 0 | 0 | 0 | 0 | 0 | 0 | 0 | 0 | 0 | 0 | 0 | 1 | 0 | 0 |
| 7 | FW | (Norway) Lars Olden Larsen | 2 | 0 | 0 | 0 | 0 | 0 | 0 | 0 | 0 | 0 | 0 | 0 | 0 | 0 | 0 | 2 | 0 | 0 |
| 10 | FW | (Norway) Troy Nyhammer | 1 | 0 | 0 | 0 | 0 | 0 | 0 | 0 | 0 | 0 | 0 | 0 | 1 | 0 | 0 | 2 | 0 | 0 |
| 15 | FW | (Norway) Vegard Erlien | 1 | 0 | 0 | 0 | 0 | 0 | 0 | 0 | 0 | 0 | 0 | 0 | 0 | 0 | 0 | 1 | 0 | 0 |
| 21 | DF | (Norway) Tobias Guddal | 2 | 0 | 0 | 0 | 0 | 0 | 0 | 0 | 0 | 0 | 0 | 0 | 0 | 0 | 0 | 2 | 0 | 0 |
| 21 | DF | (Sweden) Leon Hien | 1 | 0 | 0 | 0 | 0 | 0 | 0 | 0 | 0 | 0 | 0 | 0 | 0 | 0 | 0 | 1 | 0 | 0 |
| 22 | MF | (Norway) Heine Åsen Larsen | 3 | 0 | 0 | 0 | 0 | 0 | 0 | 0 | 0 | 0 | 0 | 0 | 1 | 0 | 0 | 4 | 0 | 0 |
| 24 | DF | (Nigeria) Vince Osuji | 2 | 0 | 0 | 0 | 0 | 0 | 0 | 0 | 0 | 0 | 0 | 0 | 0 | 0 | 0 | 2 | 0 | 0 |
| 29 | DF | (Sweden) Alexander Warneryd | 1 | 0 | 1 | 0 | 0 | 0 | 0 | 0 | 0 | 0 | 0 | 0 | 1 | 0 | 0 | 2 | 0 | 1 |
| 30 | DF | (Norway) Isak Vådebu | 1 | 0 | 0 | 0 | 0 | 0 | 0 | 0 | 0 | 0 | 0 | 0 | 0 | 0 | 0 | 1 | 0 | 0 |
| 33 | DF | (The Gambia) Musa Jatta | 1 | 0 | 0 | 0 | 0 | 0 | 0 | 0 | 0 | 0 | 0 | 0 | 0 | 0 | 0 | 1 | 0 | 0 |
| 37 | MF | (Norway) Sander Innvær | 2 | 0 | 0 | 0 | 0 | 0 | 0 | 0 | 0 | 0 | 0 | 0 | 0 | 0 | 0 | 2 | 0 | 0 |
| Total | | | 26 | 0 | 1 | 0 | 0 | 0 | 0 | 0 | 0 | 2 | 0 | 0 | 3 | 0 | 0 | 31 | 0 | 1 |

== See also ==
- Tromsø IL seasons
