= Nikolay Hristov =

Nikolay Hristov may refer to:

- Nikolay Hristov (footballer, born 1989), Bulgarian footballer, born 1989.
- Nikolay Jakobsen Hristov, Bulgarian footballer, born 2000.

See also

- Nikola Hristov, Bulgarian footballer for Dunav Ruse
