= Isak Dahlqvist =

Swedish footballer

Personal information
- Full name: Isak Mikael Dahlqvist
- Date of birth: 25 September 2001 (age 25)
- Place of birth: Öckerö, Sweden
- Height: 1.73 m (5 ft 8 in)
- Position: Midfielder

Team information
- Current team: Tromsø
- Number: 17

Youth career
- –2015: Öckerö IF
- 2016–2020: IFK Göteborg

Senior career*
Years	Team	Apps	(Gls)
2020–2021	IFK Göteborg	4	(0)
2022–2025	Örgryte IS	106	(18)
2026	Blau-Weiß Linz	11	(0)
2026–	Tromsø	4	(0)

International career^{‡}
2017	Sweden U17	1	(0)
2018	Sweden U19	2	(0)
- * Club domestic league appearances and goals as of 31 August 2026 ‡ National team caps and goals as of 30 June 2026

Isak Dahlqvist (born 25 September 2001) is a Swedish professional footballer who plays as a midfielder for Eliteserien club Tromsø.

== Club Career ==
=== IFK Göteborg ===
Up until Dahlqvist was fourteen years old, he played for his hometown team Öckerö IF, before moving on to IFK Göteborg's youth setup in 2016. In 2020 Dahlqvist played his first game for the first team in a Svenska Cupen match against Husqvarna FF. In January 2021, Dahlqvist signed his first professional contract with IFK Göteborg, lasting three years.

=== Örgryte IS ===
After several years at IFK Göteborg, Dahlqvist signed with Superettan club Örgryte IS in January 2022. The contract lasted until the end of the 2024 season, and was in 2023 extended until the end of the 2025 season. At Örgryte IS, Dahlqvist played 121 games in all competitions, while his last season with the club ended in promotion to the Allsvenskan.

=== Blau-Weiß Linz ===
As Dahlqvist's contract with Örgryte IS ended after the 2025 season, he signed with Austiran side Blau-Weiß Linz. The first season at the club ended with eleven games in the league and relegation for the club.

=== Tromsø ===
In June 2026, after Blau-Weiß Linz relegation, Dahlqvist terminated his contract with the club and was signed by Norwegian club Tromsø on a three-and-a-half year contract. The club had previously tried to sign Dahlqvist in the summer of 2025, but eventually went with Alexander Warneryd instead.

== International career ==
Dahlqvist has played one game for Sweden U17 and two games for Sweden U19.

== Personal life ==
He is the younger brother of fellow footballers Hampus and Edvin Dahlqvist.

== Career statistics ==
As of 31 August 2026

Appearances and goals by club, season and competition
Club	Season	League			National Cup (Note: Includes Svenska Cupen, Austrian Cup)		Europe		Other		Total	
Club	Season	Division	Apps	Goals	Apps	Goals	Apps	Goals	Apps	Goals	Apps	Goals
IFK Göteborg	2020	Allsvenskan	1	0	1	0	—		—		2	0
IFK Göteborg	2021	Allsvenskan	3	0	2	0	—		—		5	0
IFK Göteborg	Total		4	0	3	0	—		—		7	0
Örgryte IS	2022	Superettan	23	5	4	0	—		2 (Note: Appearance(s) in Superettan relegation play-offs)	0	27	5
Örgryte IS	2023	Superettan	25	2	1	0	—		1	0	26	2
Örgryte IS	2024	Superettan	28	5	4	0	—		—		32	5
Örgryte IS	2025	Superettan	30	6	3	0	—		—		33	6
Örgryte IS	Total		106	18	12	0	—		3	0	121	18
Blau-Weiß Linz	2025–26	Austrian Bundesliga	11	0	1	1	—		—		12	1
Tromsø	2026	Eliteserien	4	0	0	0	6 (Note: Two appearances in UEFA Europa League, four appearances and three goals in UEFA Conference League)	3	—		10	3
Career total			125	18	16	1	6	3	3	0	150	22
