= 2023 Tromsø IL season =

Tromsø
2023 season
- Chairman: Helge Kræmer
- Manager: Gaute Helstrup
- Stadium: Romssa Arena
- Eliteserien: 3rd
- 2022 Norwegian Cup: Quarter-finals
- 2023 Norwegian Cup: Fourth round
- Top goalscorer: League: Vegard Erlien (14); All: Vegard Erlien (15)
Home colours	Away colours

The 2023 season was Tromsø IL's 103rd season in existence and the club's third consecutive season in the top flight of Norwegian football. In addition to the domestic league, Tromsø IL participated in this season's edition of the Norwegian Football Cup.

== Players ==
=== First team squad ===
As of 25 August 2023

Note: Flags indicate national team as defined under FIFA eligibility rules; some limited exceptions apply. Players may hold more than one non-FIFA nationality.

No.	Pos.	Nation	Player
1	GK	DEN	Jakob Haugaard
2	DF	NOR	Oskar Opsahl
4	DF	NOR	Jostein Gundersen
5	DF	NOR	Anders Jenssen
7	MF	DEN	Felix Winther
8	MF	NOR	Kent-Are Antonsen
10	MF	NOR	Jakob Napoleon Romsaas
11	MF	NOR	Ruben Yttergård Jenssen (captain)
12	GK	CAN	Simon Thomas
14	DF	NOR	Tobias Vonheim Norbye
15	FW	NOR	Vegard Erlien
16	DF	FIN	Miika Koskela

No.	Pos.	Nation	Player
17	FW	NOR	Yaw Paintsil
18	FW	NOR	Lasse Nordås
19	DF	DEN	Niklas Vesterlund
20	DF	GAM	Dadi Dodou Gaye
22	MF	NOR	Sakarias Opsahl
23	MF	NOR	Runar Norheim
25	MF	NOR	Lasse Nilsen
26	DF	SEN	El Hadji Malick Diouf
27	FW	NOR	Jens Hjertø-Dahl
28	DF	FRA	Christophe Psyché
29	FW	GUI	Maï Traoré (on loan from Viking)
32	GK	NOR	Marius Tollefsen

For season transfers, see transfers summer 2023.

=== On loan ===
Note: Flags indicate national team as defined under FIFA eligibility rules; some limited exceptions apply. Players may hold more than one non-FIFA nationality.

No.	Pos.	Nation	Player
3	DF	NOR	Jesper Robertsen (at Mjøndalen until 31 December 2023)
—	FW	NOR	Elias Aarflot (at Grorud until 31 December 2023)
21	FW	NOR	Tobias Hafstad (at Egersund until 31 December 2023)

No.	Pos.	Nation	Player
—	GK	NOR	Mats Trige (at Alta until 31 December 2023)
—	DF	NOR	Isak Vik (at Tromsdalen until 31 December 2023)
—	DF	NOR	Isak Vådebu (at Tromsdalen until 31 December 2023)

== Transfers ==
=== Winter ===
In: Note: Flags indicate national team as defined under FIFA eligibility rules; some limited exceptions apply. Players may hold more than one non-FIFA nationality.

No.	Pos.	Nation	Player
1	GK	DEN	Jakob Haugaard (from (Sweden) AIK, previously on loan)
9	MF	ISL	Hilmir Rafn Mikaelsson (on loan from (Italy) Venezia)
10	MF	NOR	Jakob Napoleon Romsaas (from Skeid)
14	DF	NOR	Tobias Vonheim Norbye (from Alta)
15	FW	NOR	Vegard Erlien (from Ranheim)
16	DF	FIN	Miika Koskela (from (Finland) Oulu)
17	FW	NOR	Winston Paintsil (from Kjelsås)
26	DF	SEN	El Hadji Malick Diouf (from (Senegal) Academie Mawade Wade)
27	FW	NOR	Jens Hjertø-Dahl (promoted from junior squad)
29	FW	GUI	Maï Traoré (on loan from Viking)
32	GK	NOR	Mats Trige (loan return from Skeid)

Out: Note: Flags indicate national team as defined under FIFA eligibility rules; some limited exceptions apply. Players may hold more than one non-FIFA nationality.

No.	Pos.	Nation	Player
6	DF	NOR	Mikkel Konradsen Ceïde (loan return to Rosenborg)
9	FW	NOR	Lasse Nordås (loan return to Bodø/Glimt)
14	DF	NOR	Warren Kamanzi (to (France) Toulouse)
15	FW	FIN	Jasse Tuominen (loan return to (Sweden) Häcken)
17	MF	NOR	Eric Kitolano (to Molde)
18	FW	NOR	Elias Aarflot (on loan to Lyn)
26	DF	NOR	Isak Kjelsrud Vik (on loan to Tromsdalen)
29	FW	NOR	Didrik Hafstad (to Tromsdalen)
32	GK	NOR	Mats Trige (on loan to Skeid, previously on loan at Alta)

=== Summer ===
In: Note: Flags indicate national team as defined under FIFA eligibility rules; some limited exceptions apply. Players may hold more than one non-FIFA nationality.

No.	Pos.	Nation	Player
18	FW	NOR	Lasse Nordås (from Bodø/Glimt)
20	DF	NOR	Dadi Dodou Gaye (from KFUM)
30	DF	NOR	Isak Vådebu (from Tromsdalen)

Out: Note: Flags indicate national team as defined under FIFA eligibility rules; some limited exceptions apply. Players may hold more than one non-FIFA nationality.

No.	Pos.	Nation	Player
3	DF	NOR	Jesper Robertsen (on loan to Mjøndalen)
9	MF	ISL	Hilmir Rafn Mikaelsson (loan return to (Italy) Venezia)
18	FW	NOR	Elias Aarflot (on loan to Grorud, previously on loan at Lyn)
20	DF	NOR	Casper Øyvann (to Molde)
21	MF	NOR	Tobias Hafstad (on loan to Egersund)
24	MF	NOR	Daniel Bassi (to Bodø/Glimt)

== Pre-season and friendlies ==
Win Draw Loss Fixtures

2 April 2023 Friendly	Tromsø (Norway)	1–0	(Norway) HamKam	Tromsø
13:00 CEST (UTC+2)				Stadium: Romssa Arena

== Competitions ==
=== Overview ===
Competition	First match	Last match	Starting round	Final position	Record							
Competition	First match	Last match	Starting round	Final position	Pld	W	D	L	GF	GA	GD	Win %
Eliteserien	10 April 2023	3 December 2023	Matchday 1	3rd	30	19	4	7	48	33	+15	63.33
2022 Norwegian Cup	5 March 2023	26 April 2023	Fourth round	Quarter-finals	2	0	1	1	3	4	−1	0.00
2023 Norwegian Cup	24 May 2023	28 June 2023	First round	Fourth round	4	2	1	1	12	4	+8	50.00
Total					36	21	6	9	63	41	+22	58.33

Last updated: 3 December 2023
Source: Soccerway

=== Eliteserien ===
==== League table ====
Pos	Team	Pld	W	D	L	GF	GA	GD	Pts	Qualification or relegation
1	Bodø/Glimt (C)	30	22	4	4	78	38	+40	70	Qualification for the Champions League second qualifying round
2	Brann	30	19	4	7	55	35	+20	61	Qualification for the Conference League second qualifying round
3	Tromsø	30	19	4	7	48	33	+15	61	Qualification for the Conference League second qualifying round
4	Viking	30	18	4	8	61	48	+13	58	
5	Molde	30	15	6	9	65	39	+26	51	Qualification for the Europa League second qualifying round (Note: Molde qualified for the Europa League second qualifying round by winning the 2023 Norwegian Football Cup.)

Source: Football Association of Norway (in Norwegian)
Rules for classification: 1) Points; 2) Goal difference; 3) Goals scored; 4) Head-to-head points; 5) Head-to-head goal difference; 6) Head-to-head goals scored.
(C) Champions

==== Results summary ====
Overall								Home						Away					
Pld	W	D	L	GF	GA	GD	Pts	W	D	L	GF	GA	GD	W	D	L	GF	GA	GD
30	19	4	7	48	33	+15	61	9	2	4	23	15	+8	10	2	3	25	18	+7

Last updated: 3 December 2023.

==== Results by round ====
Round	1	2	3	4	5	6	7	8	9	10	11	12	13	14	15	16	17	18	19	20	21	22	23	24	25	26	27	28	29	30
Ground	H	A	H	A	H	A	H	A	H	A	H	A	H	A	H	A	H	A	H	A	H	H	A	H	A	A	H	A	H	A
Result	W	D	D	W	L	W	L	W	W	W	W	W	D	L	W	W	W	W	W	L	W	W	L	W	W	W	L	W	W	D
Position	5	4	7	3	6	4	6	5	3	2	2	2	2	3	3	3	3	3	3	3	3	3	3	4	4	2	3	3	3	3

A = Away; H = Home; W = Win; D = Draw; L = Loss

==== Matches ====
The league fixtures were announced on 9 December 2022.

10 April 2023 1	Tromsø	1–0	Molde	Tromsø
17:00 CEST (UTC+2)	Nilsen (yellow card) 42'; Opsahl (penalty missed) 51'; Erlien 54' (yellow card) 90+3'	Report	Risa (yellow card) 81'	Stadium: Romssa Arena; Attendance: 3,723; Referee: Mohammad Usman Aslam

16 April 2023 2	Sandefjord	0–0	Tromsø	Sandefjord
17:00 CEST (UTC+2)	Amin (yellow card) 22'; Ottosson (yellow card) 90+5'	Report		Stadium: Release Arena; Attendance: 3,313; Referee: Sigurd Smehus Kringstad

23 April 2023 3	Tromsø	1–1	Viking	Tromsø
17:00 CEST (UTC+2)	Vesterlund (yellow card) 20'; Erlien 30' (pen.)	Report	Stensness (yellow card) 29'; Svendsen 70'; D'Agostino (yellow card) 77'; Yazbek (yellow card) 80'	Stadium: Romssa Arena; Attendance: 5,028; Referee: Sivert Øksnes Amland

30 April 2023 4	Strømsgodset	0–1	Tromsø	Drammen
17:00 CEST (UTC+2)		Report	Paintsil 73'; Koskela (yellow card) 90'	Stadium: Marienlyst Stadion; Attendance: 5,008; Referee: Svein Tore Sinnes

7 May 2023 5	Tromsø	0–1	Odd	Tromsø
17:00 CEST (UTC+2)	Koskela (yellow card) 86'	Report	Ruud (yellow card) 35'; Jevtović (yellow card) 39'; Bang-Kittilsen 80'; Tomas (yellow card) 88'	Stadium: Romssa Arena; Attendance: 3,800; Referee: Marius Hansen Grøtta

13 May 2023 6	HamKam	1–2	Tromsø	Hamar
17:00 CEST (UTC+2)	Melgalvis 72' (pen.); Sandberg (red card) 90+9'	Report	Bassi 45'; Psyché (yellow card) 65'; Antonsen (yellow card) 71'; Vesterlund 90+11' (pen.)	Stadium: Briskeby Stadion; Attendance: 3,315; Referee: Ajdin Medic

16 May 2023 7	Tromsø	2–3	Bodø/Glimt	Tromsø
18:00 CEST (UTC+2)	Erlien 2', 60'; Gundersen (yellow card) 56'; Antonsen (yellow card) 83'	Report	Pemi 4', 58'; Pellegrino 25' (pen.); Vetlesen (yellow card) 67'	Stadium: Romssa Arena; Attendance: 6,691; Referee: Ola Hobber Nilsen

29 May 2023 8	Haugesund	1–2	Tromsø	Haugesund
17:00 CEST (UTC+2)	Leite 32'	Report	Gundersen 18' (yellow card) 90+3'; A. Jenssen 49'; Bassi (yellow card) 69'; Traoré (yellow card) 90'	Stadium: Haugesund Stadion; Attendance: 3,807; Referee: Steinar Hauge

4 June 2023 9	Tromsø	2–1	Sarpsborg 08	Tromsø
17:00 CEST (UTC+2)	Vesterlund 73'; Traoré 90+2'; Erlien (yellow card) 90+5'	Report	Torp 30' (yellow card) 49'; Maigaard (yellow card) 58'	Stadium: Romssa Arena; Attendance: 2,910; Referee: Kristoffer Hagenes

11 June 2023 10	Aalesund	2–3	Tromsø	Ålesund
17:00 CEST (UTC+2)	Kristensen 24'; Karlsbakk 81'	Report	Psyché (yellow card) 28'; Erlien 40', 54'; Vesterlund 73'	Stadium: Color Line Stadion; Attendance: 4,042; Referee: Daniel Higraff

25 June 2023 11	Tromsø	2–1	Stabæk	Tromsø
17:00 CEST (UTC+2)	Paintsil 15'; Erlien 35'	Report	Høgh 7' (red card) 86'; Wangberg (yellow card) 29'	Stadium: Romssa Arena; Attendance: 3,902; Referee: Jan Morten Tennøy

2 July 2023 12	Lillestrøm	0–1	Tromsø	Lillestrøm
17:00 CEST (UTC+2)		Report	Traoré 50'; Hjertø-Dahl (yellow card) 87'	Stadium: Åråsen Stadion; Attendance: 6,637; Referee: Ola Hobber Nilsen

9 July 2023 13	Tromsø	0–0	Vålerenga	Tromsø
17:00 CEST (UTC+2)	Diouf (yellow card) 84'	Report	Riisnæs (yellow card) 48'; Zuta (yellow card) 65'	Stadium: Romssa Arena; Attendance: 4,406; Referee: Tore Hansen

16 July 2023 14	Rosenborg	2–1	Tromsø	Trondheim
17:00 CEST (UTC+2)	Pereira (yellow card) 29'; Sæter 41'; Cornic (yellow card) 55'; U. Y. Jenssen 90+1'	Report	Diouf 69' (yellow card) 71' (yellow-red card) 84'; Traoré (yellow card) 85'	Stadium: Lerkendal Stadion; Attendance: 12,513; Referee: Mohammad Usman Aslam

23 July 2023 15	Tromsø	3–1	Brann	Tromsø
17:00 CEST (UTC+2)	Romsaas 6', 46'; Antonsen (yellow card) 71'; Jenssen (yellow card) 75'; R. Y. Jenssen 90+3'	Report	Knudsen (yellow card) 17'; Øyvann 65' (o.g.)	Stadium: Romssa Arena; Attendance: 4,906; Referee: Espen Eskås

30 July 2023 16	Bodø/Glimt	0–2	Tromsø	Bodø
19:15 CEST (UTC+2)	Grønbæk (yellow card) 66'	Report	Romsaas 21'; Paintsil 62'; Antonsen (yellow card) 66'; R. Y. Jenssen (yellow card) 70'	Stadium: Aspmyra Stadion; Attendance: 8,192; Referee: Tore Hansen

6 August 2023 17	Tromsø	3–1	Lillestrøm	Tromsø
17:00 CEST (UTC+2)	Gundersen (yellow card) 23' (goal) 66'; Erlien 72' (pen.); Paintsil 89'	Report	Svendsen (yellow card) 25'; Garnås 45' (yellow card) 51'	Stadium: Romssa Arena; Attendance: 5,381; Referee: Sivert Øksnes Amland

20 August 2023 19	Tromsø	1–0	Sandefjord	Tromsø
17:00 CEST (UTC+2)	Romsaas 85'; Gundersen (yellow card) 90'	Report		Stadium: Romssa Arena; Attendance: 5,411; Referee: Daniel Higraff

26 August 2023 20	Sarpsborg 08	4–0	Tromsø	Sarpsborg
18:00 CEST (UTC+2)	Maigaard 11'; Opseth 50'; Christiansen (yellow card) 54'; Skålevik 77'; Meister (yellow card) 82'; Casas (yellow card) 82'; Sandberg 90+4'	Report		Stadium: Sarpsborg Stadion; Attendance: 4,133; Referee: Ola Hobber Nilsen

3 September 2023 21	Tromsø	3–1	Rosenborg	Tromsø
17:00 CEST (UTC+2)	Romsaas 15'; Antonsen 49'; Erlien 85'	Report	Þorvaldsson 66'	Stadium: Romssa Arena; Attendance: 6,216; Referee: Christian Moen

17 September 2023 22	Tromsø	2–1	HamKam	Tromsø
17:00 CEST (UTC+2)	Opsahl 33'; R. Y. Jenssen 38'	Report	Kjærgaard 53'; Opsahl (yellow card) 90'	Stadium: Romssa Arena; Attendance: 4,790; Referee: Jan Morten Tennøy

24 September 2023 23	Brann	2–1	Tromsø	Bergen
19:15 CEST (UTC+2)	Børsting 40'; Finne (yellow card) 42' (goal) 45+2'; Nilsen (yellow card) 62'	Report	Romsaas (yellow card) 27'; Psyché (yellow card) 29'; Erlien 90+3' (pen.); R. Y. Jenssen (yellow card) 90+7'	Stadium: Brann Stadion; Attendance: 15,062; Referee: Svein Tore Sinnes

30 September 2023 18	Stabæk	0–1	Tromsø	Bærum
17:00 CEST (UTC+2)	Edwards (yellow card) 16'; Kostadinov (yellow card) 19'	Report	Traoré 50'; Romsaas (yellow card) 90+5'	Stadium: Nadderud Stadion; Attendance: 3,119; Referee: Christian Moen

8 October 2023 24	Tromsø	1–2	Aalesund	Tromsø
17:00 CEST (UTC+2)	Psyché (yellow card) 45'; Erlien 52'; Nordås (yellow card) 84'	Report	Segberg (yellow card) 40'; Kristensen (yellow card) 45'; Karlsbakk 45+2'; Kitolano (yellow card) 73'; Hammer 88'	Stadium: Romssa Arena; Attendance: 4,613; Referee: Ajdin Medic

22 October 2023 25	Viking	3–4	Tromsø	Stavanger
19:15 CEST (UTC+2)	Adegbenro (yellow card) 34'; Yazbek 63'; Auklend 79'; Haugen (yellow card) 83'; Salvesen 85'	Report	Erlien (yellow card) 42' (goal) 49', 51'; R. Y. Jenssen (yellow card) 44'; Gundersen (yellow card) 81'; Vesterlund 89'; Paintsil 90+4'	Stadium: Viking Stadion; Attendance: 13,105; Referee: Espen Eskås

30 October 2023 26	Molde	1–4	Tromsø	Molde
21:00 CET (UTC+1)	Haugen 84'; Eikrem (yellow card) 88'	Report	Gundersen (yellow card) 19'; Diouf 33'; Traoré 56'; Nordås 75', 78'	Stadium: Aker Stadion; Attendance: 5,597; Referee: Svein Oddvar Moen

5 November 2023 27	Tromsø	0–1	Strømsgodset	Tromsø
19:15 CET (UTC+1)	Psyché (yellow card) 45'; Opsahl (yellow card) 90+7'	Report	Valsvik (yellow card) 29'; Leifsson (yellow card) 57'; Farji 84'	Stadium: Romssa Arena; Attendance: 4,852; Referee: Svein Tore Sinnes

12 November 2023 28	Odd	1–2	Tromsø	Skien
17:00 CET (UTC+1)	Ingebrigtsen 77'	Report	Erlien 12', 60'; Diouf (yellow card) 60'	Stadium: Skagerak Arena; Attendance: 3,894; Referee: Ajdin Medic

26 November 2023 29	Tromsø	2–1	Haugesund	Tromsø
17:00 CET (UTC+1)	Psyché 35'; Vesterlund 52'	Report	Bærtelsen (yellow card) 90'	Stadium: Romssa Arena; Attendance: 6,067; Referee: Christian Moen

3 December 2023 30	Vålerenga	1–1	Tromsø	Oslo
17:00 CET (UTC+1)	Ilić 63'	Report	Yttergård Jenssen (yellow card) 28'; Romsaas 90+3'	Stadium: Intility Arena; Attendance: 12,899; Referee: Tore Hansen

=== Norwegian Football Cup ===
==== 2022 ====
12 March 2023 Fourth round	Start	1–1 (a.e.t.) (4–5 p)	Tromsø	Kristiansand
17:00 CET (UTC+1)	Pedersen 35'; Robstad (yellow card) 57'; Sanyang (red card) 96'	Report; Penalties	Antonsen (yellow card) 47'; Erlien 70'; Diouf (yellow card) 94'; Gundersen (yellow card) 97'; R. Y. Jenssen (yellow card) 98'; Aarflot (yellow card) 101'; Paintsil (yellow card) 120+1'	Stadium: Sør Arena; Referee: Sivert Øksnes Amland
	Penalties
	Mares (penalty scored); Ness (penalty scored); Svela (penalty scored); Sjøkvist (penalty scored); Robstad (penalty missed)		(penalty scored) Erlien; (penalty scored) Opsahl; (penalty scored) Diouf; (penalty scored) Vesterlund; (penalty scored) Aarflot

19 March 2023 Quarter-finals	Tromsø	2–3 (a.e.t.)	Lillestrøm	Tromsø
17:00 CET (UTC+1)	Opsahl 32'; Mikaelsson 60'; Diouf (yellow card) 94'; Jenssen (yellow card) 116'	Report	Adams (yellow card) 41'; Lehne Olsen 48' (pen.); Ibrahimaj (yellow card) 51'; Åsen 71'; Jenssen 111' (o.g.); Ranger (yellow card) 120'	Stadium: Alfheim Stadion; Attendance: 2,331; Referee: Ola Hobber Nilsen

==== 2023 ====
24 May 2023 First round	HIF/Stein	0–8	Tromsø	Hammerfest
17:00 CEST (UTC+2)	Knudsen (yellow card) 58'	Report	Hjertø-Dahl 9', 45'; Øyvann (yellow card) 22'; Traoré 13', 54'; Hafstad 29', 63'; Romsaas 34', 88'	Stadium: Vår Energi Arena; Attendance: 600; Referee: Magnus Henriksen Tjelle

1 June 2023 Second round	Tromsdalen	1–1 (a.e.t.) (1–4 p)	Tromsø	Tromsø
18:00 CEST (UTC+2)	Skogvoll (yellow card) 15'; Larsen 61'; S. Pedersen (yellow card) 67'; T. Nilsen (yellow card) 105'	Report	Hafstad (yellow card) 9'; A. Jenssen 90+4'	Stadium: Romssa Arena; Attendance: 1,122; Referee: Kristian Kristiansen
	Penalties
	S. Pedersen (penalty missed); Vådebu (penalty scored); Ness (penalty missed)		(penalty scored) Erlien; (penalty scored) Nielsen; (penalty scored) Antonsen; (penalty scored) Diouf

7 June 2023 Third round	Alta	0–1	Tromsø	Alta
18:00 CEST (UTC+2)	Reginiussen (yellow card) 89'; Norbye (yellow card) 90+1'	Report	Bassi 29'	Stadium: SmartDok Arena; Attendance: 781; Referee: Magnus Nicolai Koløy

28 June 2023 Fourth round	Bodø/Glimt	3–2	Tromsø	Bodø
19:05 CEST (UTC+2)	Žugelj 77'; Bjørtuft 90+4'; Saltnes 90+6'; Pellegrino (yellow card) 90+7'	Report	Hjertø-Dahl 20'; Gundersen (yellow card) 45'; Erlien 69'; Jenssen (yellow card) 85'; Diouf (yellow card) 87' (yellow-red card) 90+2'	Stadium: Aspmyra Stadion; Attendance: 6,377; Referee: Rohit Saggi
