= Troy Nyhammer =

Norwegian footballer (born 2002)

Personal information
- Full name: Troy Engseth Nyhammer
- Date of birth: 19 August 2006 (age 20)
- Place of birth: Bømlo, Norway
- Height: 1.81 m (5 ft 11 in)
- Position: Midfielder

Team information
- Current team: Tromsø
- Number: 10

Youth career
- –2020: Bremnes
- 2021–2023: Haugesund

Senior career*
Years	Team	Apps	(Gls)
2022–2024	Haugesund 2	33	(13)
2023–2025	Haugesund	51	(2)
2026–	Tromsø	21	(6)

International career^{‡}
2021	Norway U15	6	(1)
2022	Norway U16	11	(3)
2023	Norway U17	10	(0)
2024	Norway U18	13	(4)
2025	Norway U19	6	(0)
- * Club domestic league appearances and goals as of 21 November 2026 ‡ National team caps and goals as of 31 August 2026

Troy Engseth Nyhammer (born 19 August 2006) is a Norwegian footballer who plays as a midfielder for Tromsø.

== Career ==
=== Haugesund ===
Hailing from Bømlo Municipality, Nyhammer played youth football in Bremnes before joining Haugesund ahead of the 2021 season. In late 2021, Nyhammer secured his first professional contract with Haugesund.

In November 2022, Haugesund decided to draft Nyhammer into the first team, effective from 2023. He made his first-team debut in a friendly match against Wolfsberger AC in Marbella in January 2023. Nyhammer then made his league debut as a substitute in May 2023 against Tromsø. As Haugesund lost, the regional newspaper described Nyhammer as "the only highlight" for the club.

His first Eliteserien start came in March 2024. He went on to start the majority of FKH's games in the 2024 Eliteserien. His first Eliteserien goal came in August 2024 against Fredrikstad, which was also the only goal of the game, clinching an important victory for Haugesund who were threatened with relegation.

=== Tromsø ===
On 29 December 2025, Tromsø announced that they had signed Nyhammer on a four-year contract, in a deal that saw Tromsø defender Miika Koskela go the other way. The deal was reported to cost Tromsø around 14,000,000 NOK including Koskela, making it one of Tromsø biggest signings of all time.

== International career ==
In 2021 Nyhammer made his debut as a Norway youth international for the Norway U15 team.

Ahead of the 2024 UEFA European Under-19 Championship, Haugesund refused to release Nyhammer to represent Norway because of several important Haugesund would be playing at the same time.

== Career statistics ==
As of 21 November 2026

Appearances and goals by club, season and competition
Club	Season	League			National Cup		Europe		Other		Total	
Club	Season	Division	Apps	Goals	Apps	Goals	Apps	Goals	Apps	Goals	Apps	Goals
Haugesund 2	2022	Norwegian Third Division	15	3	—		—		—		15	3
Haugesund 2	2023	Norwegian Fourth Division	15	7	—		—		—		15	7
Haugesund 2	2024	Norwegian Third Division	3	3	—		—		—		3	3
Haugesund 2	Total		33	13	—		—		—		33	13
Haugesund	2023	Eliteserien	5	0	2	0	—		—		7	0
Haugesund	2024	Eliteserien	25	1	0	0	—		2 (Note: Appearances in Eliteserien play-offs)	0	27	1
Haugesund	2025	Eliteserien	21	1	3	3	—		—		24	4
Haugesund	Total		51	2	5	3	—		2	0	58	5
Tromsø	2026	Eliteserien	21	6	1	0	6 (Note: Two appearances in UEFA Europa League and four appearances in UEFA Conference League)	0	—		28	6
Career total			105	21	6	3	6	0	2	0	119	24
