= Sander Innvær =

Norwegian footballer (born 2004)

Personal information
- Full name: Sander Håvik Innvær
- Date of birth: 11 October 2004 (age 22)
- Place of birth: Bømlo, Norway
- Height: 1.80 m (5 ft 11 in)
- Position: Left-back

Team information
- Current team: Tromsø
- Number: 37

Youth career
- –2020: Bremnes
- 2020–2023: Haugesund

Senior career*
Years	Team	Apps	(Gls)
2021–2025	Haugesund 2	57	(24)
2022–2025	Haugesund	53	(2)
2025–	Tromsø	14	(1)
- * Club domestic league appearances and goals as of 31 August 2026

Sander Håvik Innvær (born 11 October 2004) is a Norwegian professional footballer who plays as a left-back for Eliteserien club Tromsø.

== Career ==
=== Haugesund ===
Hailing from Bømlo Municipality, he played youth football in Bremnes. He joined Haugesund as a youth player in the fall of 2020.

Innvær made his FKH debut as a substitute in April 2022. His first Eliteserien start came in October 2023 against Strømsgodset, which Haugesund won 1–0. He was given a professional contract in the summer of 2023, lasting until the end of 2025. After the 2023 season, Innvær received an internal award as Talent of the Year. His contract was also prolonged to the end of 2027.

Playing the season opener in 2024 against Odd signalled that Innvær would make his breakthrough that season. His first Eliteserien goal came in September 2024 against Kristiansund, securing one point in a 2–2 draw.

Innvær would also go on to play fifty-seven games and scoring twenty-four times for their second team.

=== Tromsø ===
On 28 August 2025, Innvær signed for Tromsø, on a contract that lasted until the end of the 2029 season. Although Innvær played as a winger in Haugesund, his intended position in Tromsø's setup would be as a wing-back.

== Career statistics ==
As of 31 August 2026

Appearances and goals by club, season and competition
Club	Season	League			National Cup		Europe		Other		Total	
Club	Season	Division	Apps	Goals	Apps	Goals	Apps	Goals	Apps	Goals	Apps	Goals
Haugesund 2	2021	Norwegian Fourth Division	12	7	—		—		—		12	7
Haugesund 2	2022	Norwegian Third Division	25	4	—		—		—		25	4
Haugesund 2	2023	Norwegian Fourth Division	14	13	—		—		—		14	13
Haugesund 2	2024	Norwegian Third Division	4	0	—		—		—		4	0
Haugesund 2	2025	Norwegian Third Division	2	0	—		—		—		2	0
Haugesund 2	Total		57	24	—		—		—		57	24
Haugesund	2022	Eliteserien	1	0	0	0	—		—		1	0
Haugesund	2023	Eliteserien	8	0	1	0	—		—		9	0
Haugesund	2024	Eliteserien	26	1	0	0	—		2 (Note: Appearances in Eliteserien play-offs)	0	28	1
Haugesund	2025	Eliteserien	18	1	3	2	—		—		21	3
Haugesund	Total		53	2	4	2	—		2	0	59	4
Tromsø	2025	Eliteserien	2	0	0	0	—		—		2	0
Tromsø	2026	Eliteserien	12	1	1	2	6 (Note: Two appearances in UEFA Europa League, four appearances in UEFA Conference League)	0	—		19	3
Tromsø	Total		14	1	1	2	6	0	—		21	3
Career total			124	27	5	4	6	0	2	0	137	31
