= Madiodio Dia =

Senegalese footballer (born 2004)

Personal information
- Full name: Madiodio Dia
- Date of birth: 15 January 2004 (age 22)
- Place of birth: Saint-Louis, Senegal
- Height: 1.92 m (6 ft 4 in)
- Position: Centre-back

Team information
- Current team: Portsmouth
- Number: 55

Youth career
- –2022: Linguère

Senior career*
Years	Team	Apps	(Gls)
2022–2023	Linguère		
2023–2026	Haugesund	25	(1)
2024	→ Egersund (loan)	3	(0)
2024	Haugesund 2	4	(0)
2026–	Portsmouth	15	(0)
- * Club domestic league appearances and goals as of 3:59, 26 October 2026 (UTC)

Madiodio ‘Jojo’ Dia (born 15 January 2004) is a Senegalese footballer who plays as a centre-back for EFL Championship club Portsmouth.

== Career ==
=== Haugesund ===
Playing for domestic club Linguère until August 2023, Dia moved to Europe and Eliteserien club FK Haugesund. He was seen as a long-term prospect, signing a contract lasting until the end of 2028.

In the spring of 2024, Dia was on trial at IK Start. Instead of joining Start, he moved to another team on the southwest coast, Egersunds IK, on loan. Here he was among others noted for receiving a red card as Egersund was eliminated from the 2024 Norwegian Football Cup.

After being recalled to Haugesund, Dia made his Eliteserien debut in August 2024 against reigning champions Bodø/Glimt. Ahead of the 2025 Eliteserien, Dia had adapted enough to be considered as a starting player. He lacked some attacking abilities to play right back, but was seen as a choice in central defense. Some of his main strengths, owing to his stature, were defensive and attacking set pieces. Dia scored his first Eliteserien goal in May 2025 against Molde. By mid-2025, as half of the Eliteserien games had been played, FK Haugesund ranked as the league's worst team ever, having collected only two points in the table. Madiodio Dia, however, had the highest Sofascore rating of 7.14. No players in the team had scored more than his 1 goal, either.

=== Portsmouth ===
On 2 February 2026, Dia joined EFL Championship side Portsmouth for an undisclosed fee.

== Career statistics ==
As of 3 November 2026.

Club	Season	League			Cup		League cup		Total	
Club	Season	Division	Apps	Goals	Apps	Goals	Apps	Goals	Apps	Goals
Haugesund	2023	Eliteserien	0	0	0	0	—		0	0
Haugesund	2024	Eliteserien	2	0	0	0	—		2	0
Haugesund	2025	Eliteserien	23	1	3	0	—		26	1
Haugesund	2026	OBOS-ligaen	0	0	1	0	—		1	0
Haugesund	Total		25	1	4	0	—		29	1
Egersund (loan)	2024	Norwegian First Division	3	0	2	0	—		5	0
Haugesund 2	2024	Norwegian Third Division	4	0	—		—		4	0
Portsmouth	2025–26	EFL Championship	7	0	0	0	0	0	7	0
Portsmouth	2026–27	EFL Championship	10	0	0	0	0	0	10	0
Portsmouth	Total		17	0	0	0	0	0	17	0
Career total			49	1	6	0	0	0	55	1
