= Isak Vådebu =

Norwegian footballer (born 2003)

Personal information
- Date of birth: 10 August 2003 (age 23)
- Place of birth: Tromsø, Norway
- Height: 1.85 m (6 ft 1 in)
- Positions: Centre-back; wing-back

Team information
- Current team: Tromsø
- Number: 30

Youth career
- –2019: Reinen
- 2020: Tromsdalen

Senior career*
| Years | Team | Apps | (Gls) |
| 2020–2023 | Tromsdalen | 57 | (1) |
| 2022 | Tromsdalen 2 | 2 | (1) |
| 2023 | Tromsø 2 | 3 | (0) |
| 2023– | Tromsø | 37 | (1) |
| 2023 | → Tromsdalen (loan) | 4 | (0) |
| 2024 | → Levanger (loan) | 5 | (0) |
| 2025 | → Åsane (loan) | 10 | (1) |
- * Club domestic league appearances and goals as of 31 August 2026

Isak Vådebu (born 10 August 2003) is a Norwegian footballer who plays as a defender for Eliteserien club Tromsø.

== Career ==
=== Tromsdalen ===
Vådebu started his Tromsdalen career in 2020, after previously having played both football and futsal for Reinen. His debut for the club came in the final game of the 2020 season, a 1–1 draw against Brattvåg. The next two seasons, Vådebu played regularly for the team in the Norwegian Second Division, and ahead of the 2023 season, Vådebu, nineteen at the time, was named Tromsdalens new captain.

=== Tromsø ===
As early as December 2021, Vådebu was training with Eliteserien side Tromsø, although head coach Gaute Helstrup was adamant that they were not looking to sign him at the time. A year-and-a-half later, after almost four years at Tromsdalen, Vådebu signed with Tromsø. He signed a four-and-a-half year contract, and was immediately loaned back to Tromsdalen for the remainder of the 2023 season, as they were fighting for promotion to the Norwegian First Division. However, after only four games back at Tromsdalen, Vådebu was recalled back from his loan, as Tromsø had sold their centre-back Casper Øyvann and was in need of sufficient back-up for an intense end to the season. His first game for Tromsø came on 30 October 2023, against Molde in a 4–1 win, being subbed on for El Hadji Malick Diouf in the stoppage time.

Vådebu started Tromsø's first game of the 2024 season against Brann, but was substituted in the first half as a result of a poor team effort, and would only go on to play seven more minutes until the end of May. On 31 May, Vådebu, in need of more game time, was loaned out to Levanger in the Norwegian First Division. Although the loan was supposed to last until the end of the season, Vådebu returned to Tromsø, with only five appearances, after obtaining a groin injury.

After another slow start to his 2025 season, with only three appearances in almost two months for Tromsø, Vådebu was once again loaned out, this time to Åsane. Originally a season long loan, Vådebu was recalled in July. The same month, Vådebu was subbed on in a 4–1 loss against Rosenborg and received his first red card for the club, and subsequently missed the next game.

== International career ==
In February 2022, Vådebu was called up to the Norway U19 team for their match against Spain U19.

== Career statistics ==
As of 31 August 2026

Appearances and goals by club, season and competition
| Club | Season | League | | | National Cup | | Europe | | Total | |
| Club | Season | Division | Apps | Goals | Apps | Goals | Apps | Goals | Apps | Goals |
|---|---|---|---|---|---|---|---|---|---|---|
| Tromsdalen | 2020 | Norwegian Second Division | 1 | 0 | — | | — | | 1 | 0 |
| Tromsdalen | 2021 | Norwegian Second Division | 22 | 0 | 1 | 0 | — | | 23 | 0 |
| Tromsdalen | 2022 | Norwegian Second Division | 20 | 1 | 2 | 0 | — | | 22 | 1 |
| Tromsdalen | 2023 | Norwegian Second Division | 14 | 0 | 2 | 1 | — | | 16 | 1 |
| Tromsdalen | Total | | 57 | 1 | 5 | 1 | — | | 62 | 2 |
| Tromsdalen 2 | 2022 | Norwegian Fourth Division | 2 | 1 | — | | — | | 2 | 1 |
| Tromsø 2 | 2023 | Norwegian Third Division | 3 | 0 | — | | — | | 3 | 0 |
| Tromsø | 2023 | Eliteserien | 2 | 0 | 0 | 0 | — | | 2 | 0 |
| Tromsø | 2024 | Eliteserien | 4 | 0 | 3 | 0 | 0 | 0 | 7 | 0 |
| Tromsø | 2025 | Eliteserien | 14 | 0 | 3 | 0 | — | | 17 | 0 |
| Tromsø | 2026 | Eliteserien | 17 | 1 | 1 | 0 | 6 (Note: Two appearances in UEFA Europa League, four appearances and one goal in UEFA Conference League) | 1 | 24 | 2 |
| Tromsø | Total | | 37 | 1 | 7 | 0 | 6 | 1 | 50 | 2 |
| Tromsdalen (loan) | 2023 | Norwegian Second Division | 4 | 0 | 0 | 0 | — | | 4 | 0 |
| Levanger (loan) | 2024 | Norwegian First Division | 5 | 0 | 0 | 0 | — | | 5 | 0 |
| Åsane (loan) | 2025 | Norwegian First Division | 10 | 1 | 2 | 0 | — | | 12 | 1 |
| Career total | | | 118 | 4 | 14 | 1 | 6 | 1 | 138 | 6 |
