= Miika Koskela =

Finnish footballer (born 2003)

Personal information
- Full name: Miika Juho Sakari Koskela
- Date of birth: 12 July 2003 (age 23)
- Place of birth: Oulu, Finland
- Height: 1.95 m (6 ft 5 in)
- Position: Centre-back

Team information
- Current team: Haugesund
- Number: 4

Youth career
- Ajax-Sarkkiranta
- –2016: ORPa
- 2017: OTP
- 2018–2020: OLS

Senior career*
Years	Team	Apps	(Gls)
2019–2023	AC Oulu	56	(4)
2019–2022	→ OLS (loan)	21	(0)
2023–2025	Tromsø	13	(0)
2023	Tromsø 2	4	(0)
2025	→ AC Oulu (loan)	15	(2)
2025	→ Haugesund (loan)	8	(0)
2026–	Haugesund	15	(0)

International career^{‡}
2018–2019	Finland U16	6	(2)
2019–2020	Finland U17	9	(0)
2021–2022	Finland U19	5	(0)
2021–2023	Finland U21	6	(0)
- * Club domestic league appearances and goals as of 14 November 2026 ‡ National team caps and goals as of 12 September 2023

Miika Juho Sakari Koskela (born 12 July 2003) is a Finnish professional footballer who plays as a centre-back for Haugesund.

== Club career ==
=== AC Oulu ===
Born in Oulu and raised in Kempele, Koskela started his professional career at his home-town club AC Oulu in 2019. While featuring for the club's reserve team, OLS, he made his first-team debut later in the same year.

=== Tromsø ===
On 13 March 2023, Koskela joined Norwegian club Tromsø on a four-year deal, for an undisclosed fee. He made his debut for the side on 19 March 2023, in a 2–3 Norwegian Cup loss (a.e.t) to Lillestrøm. He made his Eliteserien debut on 10 April 2023, in a 1–0 home win against Molde, coming in from the bench for the final minutes as a substitute to Christophe Psyché.

Koskela struggled with injuries and was out of play for all of the 2024 season for Tromsø. When he finally was fit to play again in early 2025, Koskela was loaned out to his former club AC Oulu. The loan, originally lasting until 21 July, was extended an additional week, and ended on 28 July. Koskela played eighteen games, and scored three times.

=== Haugesund ===
After Koskela returned from AC Oulu it was reported that he would be loaned out again. The confirmation came on 2 August, as fellow Eliteserien club Haugesund loaned Koskela for the remainder of the 2025 season.

After the season, Tromsø decided to buy Troy Nyhammer from Haugeund, and as a part of the deal Koskela went the other way, making him a permanent Haugesund player. He signed a two-year contract with the newly relegated club.

== International career ==
Between 2018 and 2023, Koskela was a regular youth international and represented Finland at various youth national team levels.

== Career statistics ==
As of 14 November 2026

Appearances and goals by club, season and competition
Club	Season	League			National cup (Note: Includes Suomen Cup and Norwegian Cup)		League cup (Note: Includes Kakkonen Cup and Finnish League Cup)		Other		Total	
Club	Season	Division	Apps	Goals	Apps	Goals	Apps	Goals	Apps	Goals	Apps	Goals
OLS	2019	Kakkonen	13	0	0	0	2	0	—		15	0
OLS	2020	Kakkonen	3	0	0	0	—		—		3	0
OLS	2021	Kakkonen	3	0	0	0	—		—		3	0
OLS	2022	Kakkonen	2	0	0	0	—		—		2	0
OLS	Total		21	0	0	0	2	0	—		23	0
AC Oulu	2019	Ykkönen	4	0	0	0	—		—		4	0
AC Oulu	2020	Ykkönen	17	2	2	0	—		—		19	2
AC Oulu	2021	Veikkausliiga	15	1	2	0	—		2 (Note: Appearances in Veikkausliiga relegation play-offs)	0	19	1
AC Oulu	2022	Veikkausliiga	20	1	2	0	3	0	—		25	1
AC Oulu	2023	Veikkausliiga	0	0	0	0	5	0	—		5	0
AC Oulu	Total		56	4	6	0	8	0	2	0	72	4
Tromsø	2023	Eliteserien	13	0	5	0	—		—		18	0
Tromsø	2024	Eliteserien	0	0	0	0	—		—		0	0
Tromsø	Total		13	0	5	0	—		—		18	0
Tromsø 2	2023	3. divisjon	4	0	—		—		—		4	0
AC Oulu (loan)	2025	Veikkausliiga	15	2	3	1	0	0	—		18	3
Haugesund (loan)	2025	Eliteserien	8	0	1	0	—		—		9	0
Haugesund	2026	OBOS-ligaen	15	0	0	0	—		—		15	0
Career total			132	6	15	1	10	0	2	0	159	7

== Honours ==
AC Oulu

- Ykkönen: 2020
- Finnish League Cup runner-up: 2023
