= 2025 FK Haugesund season =

Haugesund
2025 season
- Chairman: Leif Helge Kaldheim
- Head Coach: Sancheev Manoharan (until 26 May); Toni Korkeakunnas (from 27 May)
- Stadium: Haugesund Stadion
- Eliteserien: 16th (relegated)
- 2025 Norwegian Cup: Third round
- 2025–26 Norwegian Cup: Third round
- Average home league attendance: 3,752
Home colours	Away colours

The 2025 season is the 31st season in the history of FK Haugesund and their 15th consecutive season in the top flight of Norwegian football. The club compete in the Eliteserien and the Norwegian Football Cup.

On the 5 October the club was relegated back to the Norwegian First Division.

After one third of the season, the club had collected only 1 point, which was the worst sum in Eliteserien's history. 2 points after half the games was also the worst, as was the final score of 9 points, being 2 points shy of the previous "record" from 2020.

== Friendlies ==
=== Pre-season ===
8 February 2025 Friendly	Horsens (Denmark)	0–0	(Norway) Haugesund
16:00

16 February 2025 Friendly	Haugesund (Norway)	1–1	(Norway) Moss	Estepona, Spain
13:00		Report		Stadium: Estepona Football Center

22 February 2025 Friendly	Lillestrøm (Norway)	1–1	(Norway) Haugesund
14:00

7 March 2025 Friendly	Haugesund (Norway)	3–0	(Norway) Bryne	Veavågen
17:00	24' (o.g.); Petcho Camara 85'; Kukleci 90'	Report		Stadium: Sparebanken Vest Arena; Attendance: 350

14 March 2025 Friendly	Haugesund (Norway)	1–2	(Norway) Egersund
15:00

23 March 2025 Friendly	Mjøndalen (Norway)	1–3	(Norway) Haugesund
14:00

== Competitions ==
=== Overview ===
Competition	First match	Last match	Starting round	Final position	Record							
Competition	First match	Last match	Starting round	Final position	Pld	W	D	L	GF	GA	GD	Win %
Eliteserien	30 March 2025	30 November 2025	Matchday 1		6	0	1	5	3	17	−14	0.00
2025 Norwegian Football Cup	13 April 2025	7 May 2025	First round	Third round	3	2	0	1	14	3	+11	66.67
2025–26 Norwegian Football Cup	24 September 2025	24 September 2025	Third round	Third round	1	0	0	1	1	4	−3	0.00
Total					10	2	1	7	18	24	−6	20.00

Last updated: 11 May 2025
Source: Competitions

=== Eliteserien ===
==== League table ====
Pos	Team	Pld	W	D	L	GF	GA	GD	Pts	Qualification or relegation
12	KFUM Oslo	30	8	11	11	42	41	+1	35	
13	Kristiansund	30	9	7	14	34	59	−25	34	
14	Bryne (R)	30	8	7	15	37	56	−19	31	Qualification for the relegation play-offs
15	Strømsgodset (R)	30	6	2	22	37	72	−35	20	Relegation to First Division
16	Haugesund (R)	30	2	3	25	22	80	−58	9	Relegation to First Division

Source: Football Association of Norway (in Norwegian)
Rules for classification: 1) Points; 2) Goal difference; 3) Goals scored; 4) Head-to-head points; 5) Head-to-head goal difference; 6) Head-to-head goals scored.
(R) Relegated

==== Results summary ====
Overall								Home						Away					
Pld	W	D	L	GF	GA	GD	Pts	W	D	L	GF	GA	GD	W	D	L	GF	GA	GD
5	0	1	4	2	14	−12	1	0	1	1	0	5	−5	0	0	3	2	9	−7

Last updated: 30 April 2025.
Source: NFF

==== Results by round ====
Round	1	2	3	4	5
Ground	A	H	A	H	A
Result	L	L	L	D	L
Position	11				

Updated to match(es) played on 30 April 2025. Source: NFF
A = Away; H = Home; W = Win; D = Draw; L = Loss

==== Matches ====
The match schedule was announced on 20 December 2024.

30 March 2025 1	Tromsø	1–0	Haugesund	Tromsø
17:00 UTC+1	Romsaas (yellow card) 16'; Erlien 37' (pen.)	Report	Krusnell (yellow card) 22'	Stadium: Romssa Arena; Attendance: 4,324; Referee: Sigurd Smehus Kringstad

6 April 2025 2	Haugesund	0–5	Strømsgodset	Haugesund
17:00 UTC+2	Dia (yellow card) 78'	Report	Therkelsen 15'; Krasniqi 25'; Tómasson (yellow card) 33'; Farji 48', 90+2'; Melkersen (yellow card) 70'; Möller 79' (pen.)	Stadium: Haugesund Stadion; Attendance: 6,066; Referee: Svein Tore Sinnes

21 April 2025 3	Bryne	3–1	Haugesund	Bryne
17:00	Kryger 4'; Moreira 8'; Görlich (yellow card) 26'; Strunck (yellow card) 28' (goal) 90'	Report	Eskesen (yellow card) 64' (goal) 71'	Stadium: Bryne Stadion; Attendance: 3,643; Referee: Ola Hobber Nilsen

27 April 2025 4	Haugesund	0–0	Fredrikstad	Haugesund
17:00	Fischer (yellow card) 45'; Camara (yellow card) 90'	Report	Fredriksen (yellow card) 38'; Fall (yellow card) 73'	Stadium: Haugesund Stadion; Attendance: 3,058; Referee: Eivind Bodding

30 April 2025 18	Viking	5–1	Haugesund	Stavanger
18:00	Tripić 21' (pen.), 45+6' (pen.), 62'; Kvia-Egeskog 90+2'; Askildsen 90+4'	Report	Niyukuri (yellow card) 20'; Espejord 36' (pen.); Krusnell (red card) 45+4'	Stadium: Lyse Arena; Attendance: 12,158; Referee: Marius Lien

4 May 2025 5	Molde	2–1	Haugesund	Molde
17:00	Eriksen (yellow card) 16' (goal) 43'; Abdullai (yellow card) 67' (goal) 90+6'	Report	Dia (yellow card) 18' (goal) 90'; Rohd (yellow card) 25'; Eskesen (yellow card) 32'; Leite (yellow card) 45'	Stadium: Aker Stadion; Attendance: 5,286; Referee: Stian Røvig Sletner

11 May 2025 6	Haugesund	1–4	Viking	Haugesund
19:15	Bruno Leite (yellow card) 11' (red card) 45+4'; Diarra 79'	Report	Christiansen 35' 45+1'; Mikaelsson 89' (pen.); Fischer 90+7' (o.g.)	Stadium: Haugesund Stadion; Attendance: 5,716; Referee: Espen Eskås

16 May 2025 7	Rosenborg	1–0	Haugesund	Trondheim
18:00	Zeidan 23'; Selnæs (yellow card) 49'*; M Ceïde (yellow card) 70'	Report	Eskesen (yellow card) 60'; Dia (yellow card) 79'	Stadium: Lerkendal Stadion; Attendance: 21,243; Referee: Ola Hobber Nilsen

25 May 2025 8	Haugesund	0–2	Brann	Haugesund
19:15	Nyhammer (yellow card) 26'; Dia (yellow card) 90'	Report	Sande (yellow card) 6' (goal) 60'; Heggebø (yellow card) 25' (goal) 90'	Stadium: Haugesund Stadion; Attendance: 5,404; Referee: Mathias Støfringshaug

1 June 2025 9	Haugesund	0–4	Bodø/Glimt	Haugesund
17:00	Konradsen (yellow card) 12'; Fischer (yellow card) 45'	Report	Saltnes 7'; Evjen (yellow card) 26'; Hauge 50'; Blomberg 67'; Helmersen 87'	Stadium: Haugesund Sparebank Arena; Attendance: 4,335; Referee: Marius Hansen Grøtta

22 June 2025 10	Sandefjord	4–0	Haugesund	Sandefjord
17:00	Patoulidis 9'; Cheng 59' 86'; Fischer 64' (o.g.); Tibell (yellow card) 84'	Report		Stadium: Jotun Arena; Attendance: 3,803; Referee: Rohit Saggi

=== 2025 Norwegian Football Cup ===
13 April 2025 First round	Nord	0–11	Haugesund	Norheim
16:00		Report	Engseth Nyhammer 5', 55', 81'; Eskesen 20', 41'; Samuelsen 24'; Seone 26', 75'; Håvik Innvær 69'; Tanggaard Eide 82'	Stadium: Bauge Auto Arena; Attendance: 1,013; Referee: Sondre Brudvik

24 April 2025 Second round	Vidar	1–2	Haugesund	Stavanger
18:00	Hæstad 90'	Report	Samuelsen 72'; Seone 81'	Stadium: Alustar Arena (Lassa); Referee: Mischa Huru Kellerhals

7 May 2025 Third round	Stabæk	2–1	Haugesund	Bekkestua
18:00	Isaksen 9'; Kostadinov 74'	Report	Innvær 71'	Stadium: Nadderud Stadion; Attendance: 711; Referee: Mohammad Usman Aslam

=== 2025–26 Norwegian Football Cup ===
24 September 2025 Third round	Haugesund	1–4 (a.e.t.)	Rosenborg	Haugesund
18:00 CEST (UTC+2)	Grindhaug 57'	Report	Islamović 90+4', 107'; Dahl Reitan 94', 98'	Stadium: Haugesund Stadion; Attendance: 1,045; Referee: Ola Hobber Nilsen
