= Yaw Paintsil =

Norwegian footballer (born 1999)

Personal information
- Full name: Winston Robin Yaw Paintsil
- Date of birth: 19 August 1999 (age 27)
- Place of birth: Oslo, Norway
- Height: 1.75 m (5 ft 9 in)
- Positions: Winger; wing-back

Team information
- Current team: Lillestrøm
- Number: 26

Youth career
- 2004–2016: Årvoll

Senior career*
Years	Team	Apps	(Gls)
2016–2017	Årvoll	15	(9)
2017–2022	Kjelsås	84	(16)
2017–2022	Kjelsås 2	37	(13)
2023–2025	Tromsø	63	(5)
2023	Tromsø 2	1	(0)
2025–	Lillestrøm	22	(2)
- * Club domestic league appearances and goals as of 23 July 2026

Yaw Paintsil (born 19 August 1999) is a Norwegian professional footballer who plays as a winger for Lillestrøm.

== Career ==
=== Early years ===
Hailing from Oslo, Paintsil began playing in the club Årvoll at the age of 5. Paintsil was also accepted into law school, having taken the law course in upper secondary school and watched the TV series Suits. He did not play football professionally, but moved on from Årvoll to the third-tier club Kjelsås.

=== Tromsø ===
In Kjelsås, he eventually showed enough promise to be signed by Tromsø in August 2022, effective from the end of the year. Paintsil would become fully professional, and quit his current part-time job as a front desk clerk in a law firm. Paintsil made his Eliteserien debut in April 2023 at home against Molde. After his first goal for Tromsø, Paintsil, who is of Ghanaian descent, was praised by several Ghanaian news outlets.

=== Lillestrøm ===
In July 2025, after two and a half seasons at Tromsø, Paintsil was signed by Lillestrøm. It was reported that while he was primarily used as a wing-back in Tromsø, he would be played as a winger at Lillestrøm.

== Career statistics ==
As of 9 November 2025

Appearances and goals by club, season and competition
Club	Season	League			National cup		Europe		Other		Total	
Club	Season	Division	Apps	Goals	Apps	Goals	Apps	Goals	Apps	Goals	Apps	Goals
Årvoll	2016	4. divisjon	12	8	1	0	—		1 (Note: Appearance in 4. divisjon play-offs)	1	14	9
Årvoll	2017	4. divisjon	3	1	0	0	—		—		3	1
Årvoll	Total		15	9	1	0	—		1	1	17	10
Kjelsås	2017	2. divisjon	3	0	0	0	—		—		3	0
Kjelsås	2018	2. divisjon	11	0	0	0	—		—		11	0
Kjelsås	2019	2. divisjon	9	5	1	0	—		—		10	5
Kjelsås	2020	2. divisjon	13	3	—		—		—		13	3
Kjelsås	2021	2. divisjon	26	6	2	0	—		—		28	6
Kjelsås	2022	2. divisjon	22	2	3	0	—		—		25	2
Kjelsås	Total		84	16	6	0	—		—		90	16
Kjelsås 2	2017	4. divisjon	10	2	—		—		—		10	2
Kjelsås 2	2018	4. divisjon	16	3	—		—		—		16	3
Kjelsås 2	2019	4. divisjon	10	8	—		—		—		10	8
Kjelsås 2	2022	3. divisjon	1	0	—		—		—		1	0
Kjelsås 2	Total		37	13	—		—		—		37	13
Tromsø	2023	Eliteserien	26	5	4	0	—		—		30	5
Tromsø	2024	Eliteserien	29	0	3	0	4 (Note: Appearances in UEFA Conference League)	0	—		36	0
Tromsø	2025	Eliteserien	8	0	2	1	—		—		10	1
Tromsø	Total		63	5	9	1	4	0	—		76	6
Tromsø 2	2023	3. divisjon	1	0	—		—		—		1	0
Lillestrøm	2025	1. divisjon	13	2	3	0	—		—		16	2
Career total			176	32	19	1	4	0	1	1	200	34
