= Alexander Warneryd =

Swedish footballer (born 2005)

Personal information
- Full name: Alexander Rickard Chadchai Thongla-Iad Warneryd
- Date of birth: 21 August 2005 (age 21)
- Place of birth: Sweden
- Height: 1.74 m (5 ft 9 in)
- Positions: Wing-back; winger

Team information
- Current team: Tromsø
- Number: 29

Youth career
- –2018: Rydboholms SK
- 2019–2020: IF Elfsborg
- 2021–2022: Norrby IF

Senior career*
Years	Team	Apps	(Gls)
2023	Norrby IF	23	(1)
2024–2025	Västerås SK	40	(3)
2025–	Tromsø	36	(7)

International career^{‡}
2024	Sweden U19	2	(0)
2026	Sweden U21	1	(0)
- * Club domestic league appearances and goals as of 21 November 2026 ‡ National team caps and goals as of 10 June 2026

Alexander Rickard Chadchai Thongla-Iad Warneryd (Thai: อเล็กซานเดอร์ วาร์เนริด; born 21 August 2005) is a Swedish professional footballer who plays as a wing-back for Tromsø.

== Club career ==
=== Early career ===
Hailing from Rydboholm, Warneryd joined Swedish side Rydboholms SK youth system as a youngster, where he stayed until he was thirteen years old, when he moved to the academy of IF Elfsborg. In 2021, after two years at IF Elfsborg, Warneryd moved once again, this time to Norrby IF. By 2023, he was moved up from the academy to the men's team, playing in the Ettan, where he made twenty-three league appearances, while scoring one goal.

=== Västerås SK ===
Ahead of the 2024 season, he signed for Allsvenskan side Västerås SK on a four-year contract. In his first season at the club, Warneryd played twenty-four league games, as the team ended last in the standings and were relegated to the second tier. The second season at Västerås SK saw Warneryd play another sixteen games in the Superettan, while scoring three goals.

=== Tromsø ===
On 1 August 2025, Warneryd signed with Norwegian Eliteserien side Tromsø. Norwegian media reported that the transfer cost Tromsø around 8,000,000 NOK, making Warneryd the club's record signing at the time. Warneryd's first goal for the club came against Strømsgodset in a 3–1 win in September of that year.

The next season, Warneryd scored the first goal in a 2–1 win over Brann away, the first win for the club in Bergen in six years. Following that game, both Tromsø and Warneryd had a good period through March and April, which resulted in him being named Young Player of the Month in the Eliteserien in March/April. On 16 May 2026, Warneryd received his first red card in a match against rivals Bodø/Glimt after elbowing Fredrik Sjøvold in the throat. The red card resulted in a three match ban for Warneryd. Thai newspaper Phuket Gazette wrote in 2026 that he "became a key player for Tromsø" while playing for the club.

== International career ==
Born in Sweden, Warneryd has a Swedish father and Thai mother, making him eligible to represent both countries internationally.

In late August 2024, while at Västerås SK, Warneryd was called up to the Sweden U20 squad for their friendly match against Denmark U20. The match ended in a 1–0 loss for Sweden, where Warneryd was subbed on in the 70th minute. Two years later, Warneryd was called up to the Sweden U21, and played in their 3–1 loss to Finland U21.

== Style of play ==
Warneryd plays as a defender or winger. Right-footed, he is known for his speed.

== Career statistics ==
As of 21 November 2026

Appearances and goals by club, season and competition
Club	Season	League			National Cup (Note: Includes Svenska Cupen, Norwegian Cup)		Europe		Total	
Club	Season	Division	Apps	Goals	Apps	Goals	Apps	Goals	Apps	Goals
Norrby IF	2023	Ettan	23	1	1	0	—		24	1
Västerås Fotboll	2024	Allsvenskan	24	0	3	0	—		27	0
Västerås Fotboll	2025	Superettan	16	3	3	0	—		19	3
Västerås Fotboll	Total		40	3	6	0	—		46	3
Tromsø	2025	Eliteserien	13	1	1	0	—		14	1
Tromsø	2026	Eliteserien	23	6	2	0	6 (Note: Two appearances in UEFA Europa League, four appearances in UEFA Conference League)	0	31	6
Tromsø	Total		36	7	3	0	6	0	45	7
Career total			99	11	10	0	6	0	115	11

== Honours ==
Individual

- Eliteserien Young Player of the Month: March/April 2026
