= Jakob Napoleon Romsaas =

Norwegian footballer (born 2004)

Personal information
- Full name: Jakob Napoleon Romsaas
- Date of birth: 16 May 2004 (age 22)
- Place of birth: Oslo, Norway
- Height: 1.87 m (6 ft 2 in)
- Position: Midfielder

Team information
- Current team: Charleroi
- Number: 8

Youth career
- –2021: Skeid

Senior career*
| Years | Team | Apps | (Gls) |
| 2021–2023 | Skeid | 38 | (7) |
| 2021–2022 | Skeid 2 | 3 | (1) |
| 2023 | Tromsø 2 | 5 | (0) |
| 2023–2025 | Tromsø | 57 | (11) |
| 2025– | Charleroi | 39 | (2) |

International career^{‡}
| 2022 | Norway U18 | 2 | (0) |
| 2023 | Norway U20 | 2 | (0) |
| 2025– | Norway U21 | 5 | (0) |
- * Club domestic league appearances and goals as of 17 August 2026 ‡ National team caps and goals as of 18 November 2025

Jakob Napoleon Romsaas (born 16 May 2004) is a Norwegian professional footballer who plays as a midfielder for Belgian Pro League club Charleroi.

== Career ==
=== Skeid ===
In the summer of 2021, Romsaas signed his first professional contract with Skeid at the age of 17.

=== Tromsø ===
Romsaas signed with Eliteserien club Tromsø in February 2023. In May he scored his first two goals for the club in a cup game against Hammerfest, while his first two Eliteserien goals came against Brann in July.

In the summer of 2024, Romsaas scored both of Tromsø's goals in the first leg of their third qualifying round in the UEFA Conference League tie against Scottish Kilmarnock, eventually losing out on aggregate score.

In early 2025, after two seasons at the club, Romsaas signed a new contract, this time lasting until the end of the 2028 season.

=== Charleroi ===
On 13 June 2025, Charleroi announced that their first signing of the transfer window was Jakob Romsaas. He signed a two-year contract with an option for two more years. It was described as one of Tromsø's biggest sales.

== Career statistics ==
As of 17 August 2026

Appearances and goals by club, season and competition
| Club | Season | League | | | National cup | | Europe | | Other | | Total | |
| Club | Season | Division | Apps | Goals | Apps | Goals | Apps | Goals | Apps | Goals | Apps | Goals |
|---|---|---|---|---|---|---|---|---|---|---|---|---|
| Skeid | 2021 | 2. divisjon | 14 | 0 | 1 | 0 | — | | — | | 15 | 0 |
| Skeid | 2022 | 1. divisjon | 24 | 7 | 1 | 1 | — | | 2 (Note: Appearances in the 1. division relegation play-offs) | 1 | 27 | 9 |
| Skeid | Total | | 38 | 7 | 2 | 1 | — | | 2 | 1 | 42 | 9 |
| Skeid 2 | 2021 | 3. divisjon | 2 | 1 | — | | — | | — | | 2 | 1 |
| Skeid 2 | 2022 | 3. divisjon | 1 | 0 | — | | — | | — | | 1 | 0 |
| Skeid 2 | Total | | 3 | 1 | — | | — | | — | | 3 | 1 |
| Tromsø 2 | 2023 | 3. divisjon | 5 | 0 | — | | — | | — | | 5 | 0 |
| Tromsø | 2023 | Eliteserien | 20 | 6 | 4 | 2 | — | | — | | 24 | 8 |
| Tromsø | 2024 | Eliteserien | 29 | 4 | 3 | 1 | 4 (Note: Appearances in UEFA Conference League) | 2 | — | | 36 | 7 |
| Tromsø | 2025 | Eliteserien | 8 | 1 | 1 | 0 | — | | — | | 9 | 1 |
| Tromsø | Total | | 57 | 11 | 8 | 3 | 4 | 2 | — | | 69 | 16 |
| Charleroi | 2025–26 | Belgian Pro League | 37 | 2 | 5 | 0 | 2 (Note: Appearances in UEFA Conference League) | 0 | — | | 44 | 2 |
| Charleroi | 2026–27 | Belgian Pro League | 2 | 0 | 0 | 0 | 0 | 0 | — | | 2 | 0 |
| Charleroi | Total | | 39 | 2 | 5 | 0 | 2 | 0 | — | | !45 | 2 |
| Career total | | | 142 | 21 | 15 | 4 | 6 | 2 | 2 | 1 | 165 | 28 |

== Honours ==
Individual

- Eliteserien Young Player of the Month: July 2023
