= Vince Osuji =

Nigerian footballer

Personal information
- Full name: Vince Chijioke Osuji
- Date of birth: 6 April 2006 (age 20)
- Height: 1.88 m (6 ft 2 in)
- Position: Centre-back

Team information
- Current team: Tromsø
- Number: 24

Youth career
- –2024: De Cardinal Football Academy

Senior career*
Years	Team	Apps	(Gls)
2024–2025	Kalmar FF	15	(1)
2025–2026	Club NXT	28	(1)
2025–2026	Club Brugge	1	(0)
2026–	Tromsø	0	(0)

International career^{‡}
2026–	Nigeria	1	(0)
- * Club domestic league appearances and goals as of 20 August 2026 ‡ National team caps and goals as of 6 October 2026

Vince Chijioke Osuji (born 6 April 2006) is a Nigerian footballer who plays as a centre-back for Eliteserien club Tromsø and the Nigeria national team.

== Career ==
Osuji played for De Cardinal Football Academy until April 2024, when he moved to Sweden and signed for Kalmar FF in the Allsvenskan. Osuji has been denied a transfer to KRC Genk, owing to visa problems.

According to Sveriges Radio, it was apparent that Osuji was one of Kalmar's leading players already after his first game. He scored his first Allsvenskan goal against Malmö FF.

As the 2024 Allsvenskan ended in relegation for Kalmar, Swedish media reported that at least 9 European clubs were interested in buying Osuji, in what could be a record transfer.

On 23 January 2025, Osuji signed a four-and-a-half-year contract with Club Brugge in Belgium.

In August 2026, Osuji left Club Brugge to join Norwegian club Tromsø on a permanent transfer. The move marked a return to Scandinavia for the Nigerian centre-back after his spell in Belgium.

== International career ==
On 6 October 2026, Osuji made his debut for the Nigeria national team in a friendly against Russia.

== Career statistics ==
=== Club ===
As of match played 24 January 2026

Appearances and goals by club, season and competition
Club	Season	League			Cup		Europe		Other		Total	
Club	Season	Division	Apps	Goals	Apps	Goals	Apps	Goals	Apps	Goals	Apps	Goals
Kalmar FF	2024	Allsvenskan	15	1	1	0	—		—		16	1
Club NXT	2024–25	Challenger Pro League	7	0	—		—		—		7	0
Club NXT	2025–26	Challenger Pro League	21	1	—		—		—		21	1
Club NXT	Total		28	1	—		—		—		28	1
Club Brugge	2025–26	Belgian Pro League	1	0	2	0	0	0	—		3	0
Tromsø	2026	Eliteserien	0	0	0	0	0	0	—		0	0
Career total			44	2	2	0	0	0	0	0	46	2
