= Musa Jatta =

Gambian footballer (born 2004)

Personal information
- Date of birth: 20 December 2004 (age 21)
- Place of birth: Manjai Kunda, The Gambia
- Height: 1.92 m (6 ft 4 in)
- Position: Centre back

Team information
- Current team: Tromsø
- Number: 33

Senior career*
Years	Team	Apps	(Gls)
2023–2024	BST Galaxy		
2023–2024	→ Pohronie (loan)	15	(0)
2024	Podbrezová	0	(0)
2024	→ Pohronie (loan)	13	(0)
2024–2025	AC Oulu	16	(1)
2024–2025	→ OLS (loan)	2	(1)
2026	Öster	10	(0)
2026–	Tromsø	0	(0)

International career
2025–	Gambia	1	(0)
- * Club domestic league appearances and goals as of 1 September 2026

Musa Jatta (born 20 December 2004) is a Gambian professional footballer who plays as a centre back for Norwegian Eliteserien club Tromsø and the Gambia national team.

== Club career ==
After spending the first half of the 2023–24 on loan with Pohronie in Slovak Second League, Jatta signed with Slovak First League club Podbrezová in January 2024. He was immediately there after loaned back to Pohronie.

On 22 August 2024, Jatta was loaned out to AC Oulu in Finnish top-tier Veikkausliiga. He debuted in the league on 14 September, as a starter in a 3–0 home win against Lahti. On 5 October, in the early minutes of an away match against Ekenäs IF, Jatta suffered a head injury after colliding with opponent, and was taken to hospital for treatment. Two days later, the club announced that nothing severe was found and Jatta was allowed to travel with the team back to Oulu. The club also credited performance coach Luke Robertson for not letting Jatta continue the game after the collision. After the season, Jatta joined AC Oulu on a permanent basis, signing a two-year deal with a two-year option, for an undisclosed fee.

In late-January 2026, Jatta joined Östers IF for an undisclosed fee.

== International career ==
Jatta was called up to the Gambia national team for a set of 2026 FIFA World Cup qualification matches in June 2025.

== Career statistics ==
As of 2 September 2026

Appearances and goals by club, season and competition
Club	Season	League			National cup (Note: Includes Slovak Cup, Suomen Cup)		League cup (Note: Includes Finnish League Cup)		Europe		Total	
Club	Season	Division	Apps	Goals	Apps	Goals	Apps	Goals	Apps	Goals	Apps	Goals
Pohronie (loan)	2023–24	Slovak 2. Liga	15	0	4	1	–		–		19	1
Podbrezová	2023–24	Slovak Super Liga	0	0	0	0	–		–		0	0
Pohronie (loan)	2023–24	Slovak 2. Liga	13	0	–		–		–		13	0
AC Oulu	2024	Veikkausliiga	3	0	–		–		–		3	0
AC Oulu	2025	Veikkausliiga	13	1	3	0	4	1	–		20	2
AC Oulu	Total		16	1	3	0	4	1	0	0	23	2
OLS (loan)	2024	Ykkönen	1	0	–		–		–		1	0
OLS (loan)	2025	Ykkönen	1	1	–		–		–		1	1
OLS (loan)	Total		2	1	0	0	0	0	0	0	2	1
Östers IF	2026	Superettan	10	0	0	0	–		–		10	0
Viking	2026	Eliteserien	0	0	0	0	–		–		0	0
Career total			55	1	7	1	4	1	0	0	66	3
