= Nikolay Jakobsen Hristov =

Norwegian-Bulgarian footballer (born 2000)

Nikolay Hristov
Personal information
- Full name: Nikolay Jakobsen Hristov
- Date of birth: 24 May 2000 (age 26)
- Place of birth: Oslo, Norway
- Height: 1.80 m (5 ft 11 in)
- Positions: Second striker; forward

Team information
- Current team: Tromsø
- Number: 18

Youth career
- –2012: Furuset IF
- 2012–2019: Grorud IL
- 2018–2019: → Gjelleråsen IF (loan)

Senior career*
Years	Team	Apps	(Gls)
2019–2023	Grorud IL	106	(22)
2024	Slavia Sofia	6	(0)
2024	Levanger	7	(0)
2025–2026	Strømmen	46	(33)
2026–	Tromsø	0	(0)
- * Club domestic league appearances and goals as of 2 September 2026

Nikolay Jakobsen Hristov (born 24 May 2000) is a Norwegian-Bulgarian professional footballer who plays as a forward for Tromsø.

His twin brother, Benjamin, is also a footballer.

== Career ==
Born in Oslo, Norway in a family of Bulgarian immigrants, he started his career in Furuset IF, before moving to Grorud IL. In 2019 he joined first team and become regular player. In February 2023 CSKA Sofia were interested of Hristov, but the transfer was never finished. Neverless, in February 2024 he moved to Bulgaria and joined Slavia Sofia, signing a 3 years long contract. He completed his professional debut in a league match against Beroe.
