= 2025 Sarpsborg 08 FF season =

Sarpsborg 08
2025 season
- Chairman: Hans Petter Arnesen
- Manager: Christian Michelsen (until 20 August); Martin Foyston (from 25 September)
- Stadium: Sarpsborg Stadion
- Eliteserien: 9th
- 2025 Norwegian Cup: Runners-up
- 2025–26 Norwegian Cup: Advanced to Fourth round
- Top goalscorer: League: Daniel Karlsbakk (18); All: Daniel Karlsbakk (21)
- Highest home attendance: 8,022
- Average home league attendance: 5,081
Home colours	Away colours

The 2025 season was Sarpsborg 08 FF's 17th season in existence and the club's 13th consecutive season in the top flight of Norwegian football. In addition to the domestic league, Sarpsborg 08 participated in both the 2025 and 2025–26 editions of the Norwegian Cup.

== Transfers ==
=== In ===
Pos.	Player	Transferred from	Fee	Date	Source
DF	(Iraq) Mohanad Jeahze	(United States) D.C. United	Undisclosed	7 February 2025	
GK	(Norway) Håvar Jenssen	(Norway) Fredrikstad	Undisclosed	27 March 2025	

== Friendlies ==
=== Pre-season ===
25 January 2025 Friendly	Sarpsborg 08 (Norway)	3–1	(Norway) Kjelsås
14:00

1 February 2025 Friendly	Vålerenga (Norway)	1–0	(Norway) Sarpsborg 08
15:00

7 February 2025 Friendly	Sarpsborg 08 (Norway)	2–1	(Norway) Moss
13:00

13 February 2025 Friendly	Sarpsborg 08 (Norway)	3–3	(Norway) Tromsø	Lillestrøm
14:00 UTC+1		Report		Stadium: LSK-hallen

23 February 2025 Friendly	KFUM (Norway)	1–1	(Norway) Sarpsborg 08
15:00	Hestnes 2'		Guðjohnsen 68'

1 March 2025 Friendly	Sarpsborg 08 (Norway)	0–1	(Norway) Kongsvinger
17:00 UTC+1

2 March 2025 Friendly	Sarpsborg 08 (Norway)	0–0	(Norway) Bryne
15:00 UTC+1

7 March 2025 Friendly	Sarpsborg 08 (Norway)	2–1	(Norway) HamKam
16:30 UTC+1

15 March 2025 Friendly	Sarpsborg 08 (Norway)	0–0	(Sweden) Mjällby AIF
13:00 UTC+1

22 March 2025 Friendly	BK Häcken (Sweden)	0–4	(Norway) Sarpsborg 08
14:00 UTC+1

== Competitions ==
=== Overview ===
Competition	First match	Last match	Starting round	Final position	Record							
Competition	First match	Last match	Starting round	Final position	Pld	W	D	L	GF	GA	GD	Win %
Eliteserien	30 March 2025	30 November 2025	Matchday 1	9th	30	11	8	11	48	50	−2	36.67
2025 Norwegian Cup	13 April 2025	6 December 2025	First round	Runners-up	7	5	1	1	20	8	+12	71.43
2025–26 Norwegian Cup	24 September 2025	See 2026 season	Third round	See 2026 season	1	0	1	0	5	5	+0	0.00
Total					38	16	10	12	73	63	+10	42.11

Last updated: 6 December 2025
Source: Competitions

=== Eliteserien ===
==== League table ====
Pos	Team	Pld	W	D	L	GF	GA	GD	Pts
7	Rosenborg	30	11	9	10	45	42	+3	42
8	Fredrikstad	30	11	9	10	38	35	+3	42
9	Sarpsborg 08	30	11	8	11	48	50	−2	41
10	Molde	30	12	3	15	46	42	+4	39
11	HamKam	30	10	7	13	42	47	−5	37

Source: Football Association of Norway (in Norwegian)
Rules for classification: 1) Points; 2) Goal difference; 3) Goals scored; 4) Head-to-head points; 5) Head-to-head goal difference; 6) Head-to-head goals scored.

==== Results summary ====
Overall								Home						Away					
Pld	W	D	L	GF	GA	GD	Pts	W	D	L	GF	GA	GD	W	D	L	GF	GA	GD
30	11	8	11	48	50	−2	41	5	4	6	24	26	−2	6	4	5	24	24	0

Last updated: 30 November 2025.
Source: NFF

==== Results by round ====
Round	1	2	3	4	5	6	7	8	9	10	11	12	13	14	15	16	17	18	19	20	21	22	23	24	25	26	27	28	29	30
Ground	A	H	A	H	A	H	A	H	A	H	A	H	A	H	A	H	A	A	H	A	H	A	H	A	H	H	A	H	A	H
Result	W	D	W	L	D	W	D	L	D	D	W	W	D	D	L	L	L	L	L	W	W	L	D	W	L	W	L	L	W	W
Position	4	4	2	6	7	5	6	8	8	8	7	6	6	7	7	9	10	11	12	11	10	10	11	9	10	9	9	11	10	9

Source: NFF
A = Away; H = Home; W = Win; D = Draw; L = Loss

==== Matches ====
The match schedule was announced on 20 December 2024.

30 March 2025 1	Molde	0–2	Sarpsborg 08	Molde
17:00 UTC+2	Stenevik (yellow card) 37'; Abdullai (yellow card) 68'; Granaas (yellow card) 78'	Report	D. Karlsbakk 5', 64' (pen.); Berget (yellow card) 18'; Reinhardsen (yellow card) 90+7'	Stadium: Aker Stadion; Attendance: 5,829; Referee: Daniel Higraff

6 April 2025 2	Sarpsborg 08	1–1	Vålerenga	Sarpsborg
17:00 UTC+2	Christiansen (yellow card) 66'; Carstensen 77'; Sandberg (yellow card) 90'	Report	Sørensen (yellow card) 23'; Bech Riisnæs 45+1'	Stadium: Sarpsborg Stadion; Attendance: 7,223; Referee: Marius Lien

21 April 2025 3	KFUM	1–3	Sarpsborg 08	Oslo
17:00 UTC+2	Sandal (red card) 20'; Semmen 86'; Kristensen (yellow card) 89'	Report	D. Karlsbakk 3', 52'; Halvorsen 28'	Stadium: KFUM Arena; Attendance: 1,898; Referee: Mohammad Usman Aslam

27 April 2025 4	Sarpsborg 08	2–3	Strømsgodset	Sarpsborg
17:15 UTC+2	Karlsbakk 88'; Gudjohnsen 90'	Report	Farji 19'; Dahl 51'; Taaje 86'	Stadium: Sarpsborg Stadion; Attendance: 4,435; Referee: Tore Hansen

4 May 2025 5	Viking	0–0	Sarpsborg 08	Stavanger
17:00 UTC+2		Report	Heggheim (yellow card) 23'; Bell (yellow card) 51'	Stadium: Lyse Arena; Attendance: 10,572; Referee: Ola Hobber Nilsen

11 May 2025 6	Sarpsborg 08	4–0	HamKam	Sarpsborg
17:00 UTC+2	Mares 15' (o.g.) Tangen 64' Gudjohnsen 88' Ørjasæter 90+1'	Report	Mares (yellow card) 43' Nilsen (yellow card) 77'	Stadium: Sarpsborg Stadion; Attendance: 4,503; Referee: Christian Moen

16 May 2025 7	Brann	2–2	Sarpsborg 08	Bergen
18:00 UTC+2	Guðmundsson 4'; Sande 59'	Report	Carstensen 30'; Tebo Uchenna (yellow card) 60'; Tangen 90+5'	Stadium: Brann Stadion; Attendance: 17,500; Referee: Rohit Saggi

25 May 2025 8	Sarpsborg 08	0–1	Tromsø	Sarpsborg
17:00 UTC+2	Håheim-Elveseter (yellow card) 28'; Sanyang (yellow card) 39'; Tangen (yellow card) 70'	Report	Edvardsson (yellow card) 45+1'; Camões 74'	Stadium: Sarpsborg Stadion; Attendance: 4,330; Referee: Sivert Amland

1 June 2025 9	Fredrikstad	1–1	Sarpsborg 08	Fredrikstad
14:30 UTC+2	Shein (yellow card) 21'; Øhlenschlæger (yellow card) 45'; Sørløkk 79'; Owusu (yellow card)	Report	Kock (yellow card) 72'; D. Karlsbakk 90+11' (yellow card) 90+12'	Stadium: Fredrikstad Stadion; Attendance: 12,565; Referee: Tore Hansen

22 June 2025 10	Sarpsborg 08	1–1	Bryne	Sarpsborg
17:00 UTC+2	D. Karlsbakk 30'; Vestergård (yellow card) 90+2'	Report	Moreira 20'	Stadium: Sarpsborg Stadion; Attendance: 4,483; Referee: Stian Røvig Sletner

29 June 2025 11	Bodø/Glimt	1–2	Sarpsborg 08	Bodø
17:00 UTC+2	Berg 34'	Report	Berget 37'; Jeahze (yellow card) 45'; Tebo Uchenna 90+4'	Stadium: Aspmyra Stadion; Attendance: 6,440; Referee: Mohammad Usman Aslam

6 July 2025 12	Sarpsborg 08	3–1	Haugesund	Sarpsborg
14:30 UTC+2	D. Karlsbakk 46', 75', 85' (pen.); Berget (yellow card) 90+1'		Innvær (yellow card) 6'; Korkeakunnas (yellow card) 61'; Leite (yellow card) 75'	Stadium: Sarpsborg Stadion; Attendance: 4,347; Referee: Svein Tore Sinnes

13 July 2025 13	Kristiansund	0–0	Sarpsborg 08	Kristiansund
17:00 UTC+2	Olsen (red card) 15'; Alte (yellow card) 50'	Report	Christiansen (yellow card) 33'; Koch (yellow card) 87'; Sandberg (yellow card) 90+5'	Stadium: Nordmøre Stadion; Attendance: 3,074; Referee: Mathias Støfringshaug

18 July 2025 14	Sarpsborg 08	2–2	Rosenborg	Sarpsborg
18:00 UTC+2	Karlsbakk 20' (pen.); Ndiaye (yellow card) 45'; Ørjasæter (yellow card) 51'; Berget 87'	Report	Islamović 5'; Väänänen (yellow card) 10'; Fonn Witry 34' (yellow card) 77'; Nemčík (yellow card) 56'; Sæter (yellow card) 85'; Sletsjøe (yellow card) 90+2'	Stadium: Sarpsborg Stadion; Attendance: 6,005; Referee: Tore Hansen

26 July 2025 15	Sandefjord	3–2	Sarpsborg 08	Sandefjord
16:00 UTC+2	Patoulidis 27'; Kristiansen (yellow card) 55'; Ottosson (yellow card) 60'; Hadaya (yellow card) 83'; Dzabic 104' (yellow card) 106'	Report	Wichne (yellow card) 31'; Nyland (yellow card) 42'; Tebo Uchenna (yellow card) 52'; D. Karlsbakk (yellow card) 61' (goal) 64' (pen.), 82' (pen.); Bruseth (yellow card) 84'	Stadium: Jotun Arena; Attendance: 4,722; Referee: Stian Røvig Sletner

2 August 2025 16	Sarpsborg 08	1–4	Brann	Sarpsborg
18:00 UTC+2	Koch (yellow card) 49'; Ørjasæter 51'	Report	De Roeve 42'; Finne 65'; Haaland 79'; Guðmundsson 84'	Stadium: Sarpsborg Stadion; Attendance: 5,339; Referee: Ola Hobber Nilsen

10 August 2025 17	Haugesund	3–2	Sarpsborg 08	Haugesund
17:00 UTC+2	Kukleci (yellow card) 5'; Karlsen 51' (pen.); Leite (yellow card) 66'; Seone 76'; Rohd 90+1'; Bizoza (yellow card) 90+1'	Report	Wichne (yellow card) 56'; Reinhardsen 84'; Berget 90+3'; Ndiaye (red card) 90+5'	Stadium: Haugesund Sparebank Arena; Attendance: 3,073; Referee: Sigurd Kringstad

17 August 2025 18	Vålerenga	4–0	Sarpsborg 08	Oslo
19:15 UTC+2	Sørensen 18', 42'; Ambina (yellow card) 50'; Vinícius 75'; Ofkir 77'	Report	Koch (yellow card) 46'; Ødegaard (yellow card) 74'	Stadium: Intility Arena; Attendance: 9,638; Referee: Mathias Støfringshaug

25 August 2025 19	Sarpsborg 08	0–1	Kristiansund	Sarpsborg
19:00 UTC+2	Sanyang (yellow card) 21'; Reinhardsen (yellow card) 75'	Report	George (yellow card) 36'; Tufekcic 37'; Alvheim (yellow card) 61'	Stadium: Sarpsborg Stadion; Attendance: 3,849; Referee: Ola Hobber Nilsen

31 August 2025 20	HamKam	1–3	Sarpsborg 08	Hamar
17:00 UTC+2	Granath (red card) 42'; Simenstad 63'	Report	D. Karlsbakk 37'; Berget 47'; Simenstad 54' (o.g.)	Stadium: Briskeby Stadion; Attendance: 3,483; Referee: Marius Lien

14 September 2025 21	Sarpsborg 08	2–1	Sandefjord	Sarpsborg
17:00 UTC+2	Berget 8'; D. Karlsbakk 28' (pen.); Christiansen (yellow card) 40'; Ndiaye (yellow card) 90+1'; Koch (yellow card) 90+4'	Report	Kristiansen (yellow card) 13'; Dzabic 50'	Stadium: Sarpsborg Stadion; Attendance: 4,519; Referee: Sivert Amland

21 September 2025 22	Strømsgodset	2–1	Sarpsborg 08	Drammen
17:00 UTC+2	Conteh 10'; Vilsvik (yellow card) 38'; Valsvik 60'	Report	Taaje 33' (o.g.); Utvik (yellow card) 48'; Reinhardsen (yellow card) 78'	Stadium: Marienlyst Stadion; Attendance: 4,876; Referee: Marius Hansen Grøtta

28 September 2025 23	Sarpsborg 08	3–3	Viking	Sarpsborg
18:00 UTC+2	Reinhardsen 17'; Guðjohnsen 90+8'; Opoku 90+9'	Report	Austbø 6'; Falchener 40'; Christiansen 43'; Bruseth (yellow card) 75'	Stadium: Sarpsborg Stadion; Attendance: 4,230; Referee: Rohit Saggi

5 October 2025 24	Rosenborg	2–3	Sarpsborg 08	Trondheim
19:15 UTC+2	Islamović 52', 86' (pen.); Zeidan (red card) 82'	Report	Sørli 46', 87'; Karlsbakk (yellow card) 61'; Wichne (yellow card) 72'; Christiansen 79'; Jeahze (yellow card) 90+6'	Stadium: Lerkendal Stadion; Attendance: 11,373; Referee: Svein Tore Sinnes

18 October 2025 25	Sarpsborg 08	2–5	Bodø/Glimt	Sarpsborg
14:00 UTC+2	Karlsbakk 24'; Foyston (yellow card) 36'; Sørli 66'	Report	Bjørtuft 6', 69'; Hauge 41'; Sjøvold 53'; Høgh 72'	Stadium: Sarpsborg Stadion; Attendance: 5,632; Referee: Mohammad Usman Aslam

25 October 2025 26	Sarpsborg 08	2–1	KFUM	Sarpsborg
18:00 UTC+2	D. Karlsbakk 7' (pen.) (yellow card) 90+5'; Sørli 20'	Report	Kristensen (yellow card) 22'; Sandal 76'; Tønnessen (yellow card) 79'; Nouri (yellow card) 90+7'	Stadium: Sarpsborg Stadion; Attendance: 3,886; Referee: Marius Lien

2 November 2025 27	Tromsø	4–0	Sarpsborg 08	Tromsø
19:15 UTC+1	Hjertø-Dahl 15'; Camões 24' (pen.), 26'; Olden Larsen 67'	Report	Sandberg (yellow card) 83'; Koch (yellow card) 90'	Stadium: Romssa Arena; Attendance: 3,738; Referee: Stian Røvig Sletner

8 November 2025 28	Sarpsborg 08	0–2	Fredrikstad	Sarpsborg
14:00 UTC+1	Berget (yellow card) 70'; Wichne (yellow card) 90+8'	Report	Eid 53' (yellow card) 69'; Fredriksen (yellow card) 55'; Øhlenschlæger (yellow card) 78'; Owusu 87'	Stadium: Sarpsborg Stadion; Attendance: 8,022; Referee: Daniel Higraff

23 November 2025 29	Bryne	0–3	Sarpsborg 08	Bryne
14:30 UTC+1	Skovgaard (yellow card) 52'; Moreira (yellow card) 75'; Landu Landu (yellow card) 79'	Report	Carstensen 5'; Job 56'; Nibe (yellow card) 62'; D. Karlsbakk 90+6'	Stadium: Bryne Stadion; Attendance: 2,327; Referee: Christian Moen

30 November 2025 30	Sarpsborg 08	1–0	Molde	Sarpsborg
17:00 UTC+1	Carstensen 13'	Report	Breivik (yellow card) 90+6'	Stadium: Sarpsborg Stadion; Attendance: 5,339; Referee: Rohit Saggi

=== Norwegian Football Cup ===
==== 2025 ====
13 April 2025 First round	Sprint-Jeløy	0–4	Sarpsborg 08	Moss
16:00 CEST (UTC+2)	Hussaini (yellow card) 69'	Report	Gudjohnsen 9'; Sanyang 28', 34', 64'; Svenningsen-Grønn (yellow card) 89'	Stadium: Bellevue; Attendance: 511; Referee: Abdulhadi Al-Fahad

24 April 2025 Second round	Gamle Oslo	1–6	Sarpsborg 08	Oslo
18:00 CEST (UTC+2)	Jammeh 16'; Sowe (yellow card) 34'; Graham Hansen (yellow card) 73'; Tavakoli (yellow card) 75'; Eikeng (yellow card) 90'	Report	D. Karlsbakk 6', 46'; Sanyang 7', 46', 68'; Reinhardsen 35'; Gudjohnsen 49'; Ødegaard (yellow card) 90+2'	Stadium: Vallhall Arena; Referee: Jørgen Haugen

7 May 2025 Third round	Sarpsborg 08	3–1	Sandefjord	Sarpsborg
18:00 CEST (UTC+2)	Guðjohnsen 4', 49'; Sanyang 13'	Report	Jemal (yellow card) 21'; Patoulidis (yellow card) 81'; Egeli 89'	Stadium: Sarpsborg Stadion; Attendance: 1,393; Referee: Sivert Amland

20 May 2025 Fourth round	Egersund	1–3	Sarpsborg 08	Egersund
18:00 CEST (UTC+2)	Sauer 3'; Hermansen (yellow card) 27'; Vatne (yellow card) 66'; Jenssen (red card) 50'; Sirevåg (yellow card) 84'	Report	Guðjohnsen (penalty missed) 27' 40'; Halvorsen 42'; Jeahze (yellow card) 50'; D. Karlsbakk 76' (pen.)	Stadium: B&G Parken; Attendance: 942; Referee: Kristoffer Hagenes

25 June 2025 Quarter-finals	Rosenborg	2–2 (a.e.t.) (2–4 p)	Sarpsborg 08	Trondheim
18:00 CEST (UTC+2)	Väänänen (yellow card) 13'; Islamović 90+5', 101' (yellow card) 101'; Selnæs (yellow card) 90+7'; Yttergård Jenssen (yellow card) 112'	Report; Penalties	Ørjasæter 39'; Tebo (yellow card) 42'; Jeahze (yellow card) 65'; D. Karlsbakk (yellow card) 88'; Berget 105'	Stadium: Lerkendal Stadion; Attendance: 8,169; Referee: Ola Hobber Nilsen
	Penalties
	Sæter (penalty missed); Islamović (penalty missed); Selnæs (penalty scored); Fossum (penalty scored)		(penalty scored) Sandberg; (penalty scored) Guðjohnsen; (penalty scored) Berget; (penalty scored) Ndiaye

9 July 2025 Semi-finals	Sarpsborg 08	1–0	Viking	Sarpsborg
20:00 CEST (UTC+2)	Berget 50' (yellow card) 82'; Ørjasæter (yellow card) 90+5'	Report	Roseth (yellow card) 52'; Bell (yellow card) 70'	Stadium: Sarpsborg Stadion; Attendance: 7,014; Referee: Kristoffer Hagenes

6 December 2025 Final	Lillestrøm	3–1	Sarpsborg 08	Oslo
16:00 CET (UTC+1)	Lehne Olsen 69'; M. Karlsbakk 73' (yellow card) 89'; Kitolano (yellow card) 75'; Garnås 79'; Gabrielsen (yellow card) 90+7'	Report	Berget 30'; Utvik (yellow card) 44'; Sher (yellow card) 56'; Koch (yellow card) 77'	Stadium: Ullevaal Stadion; Attendance: 23,202; Referee: Sivert Amland

==== 2025–26 ====
24 September 2025 Third round	Kjelsås	5–5 (a.e.t.) (5–6 p)	Sarpsborg 08	Oslo
18:00 CEST (UTC+2)	Holter 3'; Askengren 65'; Olafsen (yellow card) 85'; Aslaksrud 90+1' (pen.); Halvorsen 93', 106' (pen.)	Report; Penalties	Nibe 17'; Sanyang 20', 97'; Gudjohnsen 23' (yellow card) 107'; Koch 62'; Opoku (yellow card) 90'; Svenningsen-Grønn (yellow card) 96'	Stadium: Grefsen Stadion; Attendance: 531; Referee: Daniel Higraff
	Penalties
	Aslaksrud (penalty scored); Berge (penalty scored); Holter (penalty scored); Meinseth (penalty scored); Vassdal (penalty scored); Lamin (penalty missed)		(penalty scored) Reinhardsen; (penalty scored) Sanyang; (penalty scored) Jeahze; (penalty scored) Sher; (penalty scored) Koch; (penalty scored) Tangen

The remaining rounds took place during the 2026 season.
