= 2025 Norwegian Football Cup final =

- Event: 2025 Norwegian Football Cup
Lillestrøm	Sarpsborg 08
3	1
- Date: 6 December 2025
- Venue: Ullevaal Stadion, Oslo
- Man of the Match: Markus Karlsbakk
- Referee: Sivert Øksnes Amland
- Attendance: 23,202

The 2025 Norwegian Football Cup final was the final match of the 2025 Norwegian Football Cup, the 119th season of the Norwegian Football Cup, the premier Norwegian football cup competition organized by the Football Association of Norway (NFF). It was played at the Ullevaal Stadion in Oslo, on 6 December 2025, between the First Division side Lillestrøm and the Eliteserien side Sarpsborg 08.

It was Lillestrøm's 7th cup title. By also winning the 2025 Norwegian First Division, the second tier, Lillestrøm took a rare type of double. Furthermore, by winning, Lillestrøm managed to not record a single loss in the year of 2025, across all competitions. The final was also noted for being the last cup final in the traditional format; being played on Ullevaal Stadion after the conclusion of the league season. The subsequent 2025–26 Norwegian Football Cup will not follow the calendar year.

To have a winner from the second tier was not unprecedented; it previously happened in 1960, 1964, 1975, 1982, 1994, 1997 and 2012.

== Route to the final ==
Note: In all results below, the score of the finalist is given first.

Lillestrøm		Round	Sarpsborg 08	
Skjetten (D3); A 5–0	Diop 39', 50', 56', Karlsbakk 64', Vá 78'	First round	Sprint-Jeløy (D3); A 4–0	Gudjohnsen 9', Sanyang 28', 34', 64'
Eidsvold Turn (D2); A 2–0	Adedeji 34', Vá 90+5'	Second round	Gamle Oslo (D3); A 6–1	Karlsbakk 6', 46', Sanyang 7', 46', 68', Reinhardsen 35', Gudjohnsen 49'
Grorud (D2); A 3–2 a.e.t.	Vá 53', Kitolano 98', Karlsbakk 102'	Third round	Sandefjord (ES); H 3–1	Guðjohnsen 4', 49', Sanyang 13'
Fredrikstad (ES); H 1–1 a.e.t. (3–1 p)	Lehne Olsen 13'	Fourth round	Egersund (D1); A 3–1	Guðjohnsen 40', Halvorsen 42', Karlsbakk 76' (pen.)
KFUM Oslo (ES); H 2–0	Karlsbakk 51', Diop 84'	Quarter-final	Rosenborg (ES); A 2–2 a.e.t. (4–2 p)	Ørjasæter 39', Berget 105'
Kristiansund (ES) h 2–0	Karlsbakk 33', Lehne Olsen 47'	Semi-final	Viking (ES); H 1–0	Berget 50'

Key:

- ES = Eliteserien team
- D1 = 1. divisjon team
- D2 = 2. divisjon team
- D3 = 3. divisjon team
- H = Home
- A = Away

== Match ==
=== Details ===
6 December 2025
16:00 CET (UTC+1)

Lillestrøm	3–1	Sarpsborg 08
Lehne Olsen 69'; Karlsbakk 73'; Garnås 79'	Report	Berget 30'

Ullevaal Stadion, Oslo
Attendance: 23,202
Referee: Sivert Øksnes Amland (Fana)

Lillestrøm	Sarpsborg 08

Lillestrøm:
GK	12	(Norway) Mads Hedenstad Christiansen
RB	2	(Norway) Lars Ranger
CB	28	(Norway) Ruben Gabrielsen (c)	(yellow card) 90+7'
CB	4	(Norway) Espen Garnås
LB	5	(Norway) Frederik Elkær
RM	8	(Norway) Markus Karlsbakk	(yellow card) 89'
CM	6	(Norway) Vebjørn Hoff
LM	17	(Norway) Eric Kitolano	(yellow card) 75'
RW	15	(The Gambia) Salieu Drammeh		(substituted off) 90+6'
CF	10	(Norway) Thomas Lehne Olsen		(substituted off) 85'
LW	20	(Angola) Felix Vá		(substituted off) 85'
Substitutions:
GK	1	(Norway) Stefan Hagerup
DF	5	(Norway) Sander Moen Foss		(substituted on) 90+6'
MF	7	(Sweden) Linus Alperud
DF	19	(Norway) Kristoffer Tønnessen
MF	23	(Norway) Gjermund Åsen
MF	26	(Norway) Yaw Paintsil		(substituted on) 85'
MF	32	(Norway) Harald Woxen
FW	33	(Senegal) Moctar Diop		(substituted on) 85'
DF	64	(Norway) Eric Larsson
Head coach:
(Norway) Hans Erik Ødegaard				(yellow card) 90+10'

Sarpsborg 08:
GK	1	(Senegal) Mamour Ndiaye
RB	20	(Norway) Peter Reinhardsen		(substituted off) 85'
CB	13	(Norway) Bjørn Inge Utvik	(yellow card) 44'
CB	2	(Netherlands) Menno Koch	(yellow card) 77'
LB	3	(Iraq) Mohanad Jeahze		(substituted off) 85'
CM	33	(Norway) Andreas Nibe
CM	6	(Iraq) Aimar Sher	(yellow card) 56'	(substituted off) 85'
RW	28	(Norway) Sondre Sørli
AM	14	(Norway) Jo Inge Berget (c)		(substituted off) 76'
LW	6	(Denmark) Frederik Carstensen		(substituted off) 67'
CF	11	(Norway) Daniel Karlsbakk
Substitutions:
GK	31	(Norway) Håvar Jenssen
MF	4	(Norway) Anders Trondsen		(substituted on) 85'
DF	5	(Norway) Magnar Ødegaard		(substituted on) 85'
DF	8	(Norway) Sander Christiansen
MF	10	(Norway) Harald Nilsen Tangen		(substituted on) 76'
FW	15	(Denmark) Michael Opoku
MF	21	(Norway) Anders Hiim		(substituted on) 85'
MF	22	(Norway) Victor Halvorsen
MF	26	(Nigeria) Daniel Job		(substituted on) 67'
Head coach:
(England) Martin Foyston

MATCH OFFICIALS

- Assistant referees:
  - Ivar Askeland (IL Kvernbit)
  - Aleksander Jæger (Åssiden IF)
- Fourth official: Marius Lien (Fossum IF)
- Video assistant referee: Kristoffer Hagenes (TIL Hovding)
- Assistant video assistant referee: Magnus Nicolai Koløy (Bjørndal IF)

MATCH RULES

- 90 minutes.
- 30 minutes of extra-time if necessary.
- Penalty shoot-out if scores still level.
- Nine named substitutes.
- Maximum of five substitutions.
