= 2024 Sarpsborg 08 FF season =

Sarpsborg 08
2024 season
- Chairman: Hans Petter Arnesen
- Head coach: Stefan Billborn
- Stadium: Sarpsborg Stadion
- Eliteserien: 9th
- Norwegian Cup: Fourth round
- Top goalscorer: League: Henrik Meister (8); All: Henrik Meister (9)
Home colours	Away colours

The 2024 season was Sarpsborg 08 FF's 16th season in existence and the club's 12th consecutive season in the top flight of Norwegian football. In addition to the domestic league, Sarpsborg 08 FF participated in this season's edition of the Norwegian Football Cup.

== Players ==
=== First team squad ===
As of 4 September 2023

Note: Flags indicate national team as defined under FIFA eligibility rules; some limited exceptions apply. Players may hold more than one non-FIFA nationality.

No.	Pos.	Nation	Player
1	GK	SEN	Mamour Ndiaye
2	MF	NOR	Elias Haug
3	DF	DEN	Anton Skipper
4	DF	ESP	Arnau Casas
5	DF	NOR	Magnar Ødegaard
6	MF	SWE	Aimar Sher
7	FW	NOR	Martin Hoel Andersen
8	MF	DEN	Jeppe Andersen
10	MF	NOR	Stefan Johansen
11	MF	SWE	Simon Tibbling
14	FW	NOR	Jo Inge Berget
17	MF	NOR	Anders Hiim
18	MF	GAB	Serge-Junior Martinsson Ngouali
19	FW	DEN	Henrik Meister

No.	Pos.	Nation	Player
20	DF	NOR	Peter Reinhardsen
22	MF	NOR	Victor Emanuel Halvorsen
23	MF	NOR	Niklas Sandberg
26	MF	NGR	Daniel Job (on loan from Future Pro)
27	FW	NOR	Sondre Ørjasæter
30	DF	NGR	Franklin Tebo Uchenna
31	GK	SRB	Marko Ilić (on loan from Colorado Rapids)
32	DF	NOR	Eirik Wichne
37	FW	POL	Paweł Chrupałła (on loan from Rosenborg)
40	GK	NOR	Leander Øy
72	MF	NOR	Sander Christiansen
74	FW	NOR	Aridon Racaj
77	FW	NOR	Markus Welinder
98	MF	NOR	Rafik Zekhnini

== Transfers ==
=== Winter ===
In: Note: Flags indicate national team as defined under FIFA eligibility rules; some limited exceptions apply. Players may hold more than one non-FIFA nationality.

No.	Pos.	Nation	Player
1	GK	SEN	Mamour Ndiaye (from (Senegal) Oslo FA)
6	MF	SWE	Aimar Sher (free transfer)
7	FW	NOR	Martin Hoel Andersen (loan return from Kongsvinger)
10	MF	NOR	Stefan Johansen (free transfer)
22	MF	NOR	Victor Emanuel Halvorsen (loan return from Kjelsås)
26	FW	NGR	Daniel Job (on loan from (Nigeria) Future Pro)
27	FW	NOR	Sondre Ørjasæter (from Sogndal)
31	GK	SRB	Marko Ilić (on loan from (United States) Colorado Rapids)
37	FW	POL	Paweł Chrupałła (on loan from Rosenborg)
77	DF	NOR	Markus Olsvik Welinder (loan return from Kjelsås)
–	MF	NOR	Jakob Auby (promoted from junior squad)

Out: Note: Flags indicate national team as defined under FIFA eligibility rules; some limited exceptions apply. Players may hold more than one non-FIFA nationality.

No.	Pos.	Nation	Player
1	GK	NOR	Kjetil Haug (loan return to (France) Toulouse)
4	DF	NOR	Bjørn Inge Utvik (to (Canada) Vancouver Whitecaps)
6	MF	NOR	Martin Høyland (to Sogndal)
10	MF	SWE	Ramon Pascal Lundqvist (to (Turkey) Göztepe)
12	GK	NOR	Jarik Sundling (on loan to Kvik Halden, previously on loan at Sogndal)
16	DF	NOR	Joachim Thomassen (released)
21	GK	NOR	Anders Kristiansen (on loan to (Sweden) IFK Göteborg)
22	FW	NOR	Kristian Fardal Opseth (to Stabæk)
25	MF	DEN	Mikkel Maigaard (to (Poland) Cracovia)
29	MF	DEN	Victor Torp (to (England) Coventry City)
–	GK	NOR	Simen Vidtun Nilsen (to Ranheim, previously on loan at Skeid)
–	FW	DEN	Gustav Mogensen (to Ranheim, previously on loan at Hødd)
–	MF	NOR	Jakob Auby (on loan to Kvik Halden)

== Competitions ==
=== Overview ===
Competition	First match	Last match	Starting round	Final position	Record							
Competition	First match	Last match	Starting round	Final position	Pld	W	D	L	GF	GA	GD	Win %
Eliteserien	1 April 2024	1 December 2024	Matchday 1	9th	30	10	7	13	43	55	−12	33.33
Norwegian Cup	10 April 2024	8 May 2024	First round	Fourth round	4	3	0	1	10	6	+4	75.00
Total					34	13	7	14	53	61	−8	38.24

Last updated: 1 December 2024
Source: Soccerway

=== Eliteserien ===
==== League table ====
Pos	Team	Pld	W	D	L	GF	GA	GD	Pts
7	Strømsgodset	30	10	8	12	32	40	−8	38
8	KFUM	30	9	10	11	35	36	−1	37
9	Sarpsborg	30	10	7	13	43	55	−12	37
10	Sandefjord	30	9	7	14	41	46	−5	34
11	Kristiansund	30	8	10	12	32	45	−13	34

Source: Football Association of Norway (in Norwegian)
Rules for classification: 1) Points; 2) Goal difference; 3) Goals scored; 4) Head-to-head points; 5) Head-to-head goal difference; 6) Head-to-head goals scored.

==== Results summary ====
Overall								Home						Away					
Pld	W	D	L	GF	GA	GD	Pts	W	D	L	GF	GA	GD	W	D	L	GF	GA	GD
30	10	7	13	43	55	−12	37	4	3	8	18	28	−10	6	4	5	25	27	−2

Last updated: 1 December 2024.

==== Results by round ====
Round	1	2	3	4	5	6	7	8	9	10	11	12	13	14	15	16	17	18	19	20	21	22	23	24	25	26	27	28	29	30
Ground	A	H	A	H	A	H	A	H	A	H	A	H	A	H	H	A	H	A	H	A	A	H	A	H	A	H	A	H	A	H
Result	L	L	D	L	W	W	L	L	W	L	L	L	W	W	D	D	W	D	D	L	W	L	L	L	W	L	W	D	D	W
Position	12	15	14	16	13	10	11	14	13	14	14	15	13	12	13	11	9	9	11	12	8	9	12	12	12	12	10	10	11	9

A = Away; H = Home; W = Win; D = Draw; L = Loss

==== Matches ====
The league fixtures were announced on 20 December 2023.

1 April 2024 1	Viking	1–0	Sarpsborg 08	Stavanger
19:15 CEST (UTC+2)	Yazbek (yellow card) 42'; Christiansen 43' (o.g.); Auklend (yellow card) 71'	Report	Ngouali (yellow card) 36'	Stadium: SR-Bank Arena; Attendance: 12,521; Referee: Kristoffer Hagenes

7 April 2024 2	Sarpsborg 08	0–1	Odd	Sarpsborg
17:00 CEST (UTC+2)	Christiansen (yellow card) 58'; Berget (penalty missed) 80'	Report	Tewelde 23'; Owusu (yellow card) 52'; Miettinen (yellow card) 78'; Baccay (yellow card) 87'; Svendsen (yellow card) 90+1'	Stadium: Sarpsborg Stadion; Attendance: 4,749; Referee: Rohit Saggi

13 April 2024 3	Fredrikstad	2–2	Sarpsborg 08	Fredrikstad
18:00 CEST (UTC+2)	Kvile 50' (yellow card) 72'; Nielsen (yellow card) 78'; Johansen 90+2'	Report	Berget 6'; Tebo 74'; Andersen (yellow card) 78'; Zekhnini (yellow card) 90+1'	Stadium: Fredrikstad Stadion; Attendance: 12,504; Referee: Sigurd Smehus Kringstad

21 April 2024 4	Sarpsborg 08	0–2	KFUM Oslo	Sarpsborg
17:00 CEST (UTC+2)	Wichne (yellow card) 36'	Report	Nuñez 16'; Akinyemi (yellow card) 34'; Dahl 45+3' (yellow card) 45+3'; Sandal (yellow card) 49'	Stadium: Sarpsborg Stadion; Attendance: 4,273; Referee: Sivert Øksnes Amland

28 April 2024 5	Tromsø	0–3	Sarpsborg 08	Tromsø
17:00 CEST (UTC+2)	Haugaard (yellow card) 26'	Report	Sandberg 17' (pen.), 27' (pen.); Ørjasæter 51'	Stadium: Romssa Arena; Attendance: 4,873; Referee: Marius Lien

5 May 2024 6	Sarpsborg 08	1–0	Lillestrøm	Sarpsborg
17:00 CEST (UTC+2)	Ødegård (yellow card) 66'; Wichne 68'	Report	Olsen (yellow card) 59'	Stadium: Sarpsborg Stadion; Attendance: 4,706; Referee: Mohammad Usman Aslam

12 May 2024 7	Sandefjord	4–1	Sarpsborg 08	Sandefjord
17:00 CEST (UTC+2)	Tveter 2' (pen.), 60'; Dunsby (yellow card) 16'; Ottosson (yellow card) 30'; Al-Saed 73'; Markovic 75'	Report	Uchenna (yellow card) 27'; Wichne (yellow card) 45+4'; Johansen 51' (pen.); Meister (yellow card) 66'	Stadium: Jotun Arena; Attendance: 3,513; Referee: Sigurd Smehus Kringstad

16 May 2024 8	Sarpsborg 08	1–7	HamKam	Sarpsborg
18:00 CEST (UTC+2)	Sher (yellow card) 62'; Chrupałła 65'; Casas (yellow card) 90'	Report	Onsrud 4', 28'; Norheim 17'; Jónsson 24'; Kurtovic (yellow card) 36'; Simenstad 39'; Udahl 76'; Kirkevold 87'	Stadium: Sarpsborg Stadion; Attendance: 6,154; Referee: Marius Hansen Grøtta

20 May 2024 9	Molde	2–4	Sarpsborg 08	Molde
17:00 CEST (UTC+2)	Gulbrandsen (yellow card) 13'; Stenevik 23'; Kaasa (yellow card) 75'	Report	Chrupałła 10'; Sher (yellow card) 29'; Johansen 34'; Ørjasæter 51', 90+2'; Andersen (yellow card) 89'	Stadium: Aker Stadion; Attendance: 6,034; Referee: Marius Lien

26 May 2024 10	Sarpsborg 08	1–3	Strømsgodset	Sarpsborg
17:00 CEST (UTC+2)	Ørjasæter (yellow card) 45+1'; Reinhardsen 72'; Andersen (yellow card) 85'	Report	Therkelsen 36', 63' (yellow card) 57'; Valsvik 89'	Stadium: Sarpsborg Stadion; Attendance: 4,105; Referee: Kristoffer Hagenes

2 June 2024 11	Kristiansund	3–1	Sarpsborg 08	Kristiansund
17:00 CEST (UTC+2)	Sivertsen (yellow card) 26'; Mikaelsson (yellow card) 65' (goal) 75' (pen.); Guèye 69'; Isaksen 82'	Report	Chrupałła (yellow card) 29'Andersen (yellow card) 65'; Ørjasæter 86'	Stadium: Kristiansund Stadion; Attendance: 3,391; Referee: Sivert Øksnes Amland

28 June 2024 12	Sarpsborg 08	1–2	Bodø/Glimt	Sarpsborg
19:00 CEST (UTC+2)	Meister 23'; Ilić (yellow card) 90+1'	Report	Berg 52'; Bjørkan (yellow card) 77'; Tebo 90+2' (o.g.)	Stadium: Sarpsborg Stadion; Attendance: 6,401; Referee: Rohit Saggi

7 July 2024 13	Haugesund	1–2	Sarpsborg 08	Haugesund
17:00 CEST (UTC+2)	Liseth (red card) 2'; Sauer 68'; Selvik (yellow card) 90+4'; Nyhammer (yellow card) 90+5'	Report	Casas (yellow card) 30'; Meister (yellow card) 46'; Hiim (yellow card) 71'; Berget 79', 90+7'	Stadium: Haugesund Sparebank Arena; Attendance: 3,641; Referee: Mathias Støfringshaug

12 July 2024 14	Sarpsborg 08	4–1	Rosenborg	Sarpsborg
19:00 CEST (UTC+2)	Meister 11', 26', 31', 70'; Christiansen (yellow card) 74'	Report	Yttergård Jenssen (yellow card) 55'; Sæter 76'; Nemčík (yellow card) 83'	Stadium: Sarpsborg Stadion; Attendance: 5,304; Referee: Daniel Higraff

20 July 2024 15	Sarpsborg 08	1–1	Brann	Sarpsborg
18:00 CEST (UTC+2)	Johansen (yellow card) 10'; Ørjasæter (yellow card) 15'; Wichne (yellow card) 77'; Meister 90+1'	Report	Myhre (yellow card) 80'; Knudsen (yellow card) 85'; Heggebø 90+4' (yellow card) 90+9'	Stadium: Sarpsborg Stadion; Attendance: 5,457; Referee: Marius Lien

28 July 2024 16	Lillestrøm	2–2	Sarpsborg 08	Lillestrøm
17:00 CEST (UTC+2)	Kitolano (yellow card) 39'; Lundemo (yellow card) 40' (goal) 90+6'; Gabrielsen 47'	Report	Meister 16', 38'; Johansen (yellow card) 45+2'; Sher (yellow card) 45+3'; Eriksson (yellow card) 61'; Hiim (yellow card) 90+6'	Stadium: Åråsen Stadion; Attendance: 6,387; Referee: Marius Hansen Grøtta

4 August 2024 17	Sarpsborg 08	2–1	Sandefjord	Sarpsborg
17:00 CEST (UTC+2)	Johansen 13' (pen.); Meister (yellow card) 18'; Halvorsen 68'	Report	Mettler 48'	Stadium: Sarpsborg Stadion; Attendance: 4,610; Referee: Ola Hobber Nilsen

11 August 2024 18	Odd	1–1	Sarpsborg 08	Skien
17:00 CEST (UTC+2)	Ingebrigtsen 30' (pen.); Jørgensen (yellow card) 49'; Miettinen (yellow card) 90+3'	Report	Koch (yellow card) 28'; Christiansen 51'	Stadium: Skagerak Arena; Attendance: 4,417; Referee: Rohit Saggi

18 August 2024 19	Sarpsborg 08	2–2	Haugesund	Sarpsborg
17:00 CEST (UTC+2)	Ørjasæter (yellow card) 9'; Uchenna 27'; Job 62'; Ngouali (yellow card) 90+3'	Report	Eskesen 35'; Leite (yellow card) 53'; Diarra 81' (pen.); Manoharan (yellow card) 85'; Bærtelsen (yellow card) 89'	Stadium: Sarpsborg Stadion; Attendance: 4,493; Referee: Christian Moen

24 August 2024 20	Bodø/Glimt	6–0	Sarpsborg 08	Bodø
16:00 CEST (UTC+2)	Gundersen 19'; Helmersen 37'; Auklend (yellow card) 48'; Saltnes 72'; Hauge 74'; Høgh 79', 84'	Report	Johansen (yellow card) 32'	Stadium: Aspmyra Stadion; Attendance: 6,223; Referee: Daniel Higraff

1 September 2024 21	Brann	1–3	Sarpsborg 08	Bergen
19:15 CEST (UTC+2)	Castro 57' (pen.); Larsen (yellow card) 65'	Report	Ørjasæter 10'; Sher (yellow card) 43'; Sandberg 63'; Johansen 78'; Hiim (yellow card) 90+2'	Stadium: Brann Stadion; Attendance: 14,307; Referee: Sigurd Kringstad

15 September 2024 22	Sarpsborg 08	0–2	Kristiansund	Sarpsborg
17:00 CEST (UTC+2)	Tebo (yellow card) 42'; Ørjasæter (yellow card) 89'	Report	George (yellow card) 23'; Sjåtil (yellow card) 32'; Tufekcic 61'; Lansing (yellow card) 78'; Lien (yellow card) 78'; Alte 80'	Stadium: Sarpsborg Stadion; Attendance: 5,383; Referee: Ola Hobber Nilsen

21 September 2024 23	Strømsgodset	2–1	Sarpsborg 08	Drammen
16:00 CEST (UTC+2)	Therkelsen 6'; Stengel 27' (pen.) (yellow card) 79'; Möller (yellow card) 49'; Valsvik (yellow card) 69'	Report	Sandberg (yellow card) 25'; Johansen (yellow card) 30'; Reinhardsen 31'; Koch (yellow card) 54'	Stadium: Marienlyst Stadion; Attendance: 5,039; Referee: Marius Hansen Grøtta

28 September 2024 24	Sarpsborg 08	0–1	Fredrikstad	Sarpsborg
20:00 CEST (UTC+2)	Reinhardsen (yellow card) 44'; Ørjasæter (yellow card) 54'; Koch (yellow card) 90+6'	Report	Skogvold 48'; Eid (yellow card) 80'; Rafn (yellow card) 83'	Stadium: Sarpsborg Stadion; Attendance: 8,022; Referee: Rohit Saggi

20 October 2024 25	HamKam	0–2	Sarpsborg 08	Hamar
17:00 CEST (UTC+2)	Sørås (yellow card) 42'	Report	Carstensen 6', 39'; Sher (yellow card) 45+2'; Wichne (yellow card) 72'	Stadium: Briskeby Stadion; Attendance: 4,155; Referee: Daniel Higraff

27 October 2024 26	Sarpsborg 08	1–2	Viking	Sarpsborg
17:00 CEST (UTC+2)	Halvorsen 21'; Johansen (yellow card) 28'; Berget (yellow card) 55'; Guðjohnsen (yellow card) 87'	Report	Heggheim (yellow card) 35'; Salvesen 43'; Stensness 70'	Stadium: Sarpsborg Stadion; Attendance: 4,793; Referee: Kristoffer Hagenes

3 November 2024 27	KFUM Oslo	1–2	Sarpsborg 08	Oslo
17:00 CET (UTC+1)	Tebo 31' (o.g.); Okeke (yellow card) 48'; Njie (yellow card) 70'	Report	Johansen 72' (pen.); Sher (yellow card) 75'; Tebo 81'	Stadium: KFUM Arena; Attendance: 1,764; Referee: Marius Lien

10 November 2024 28	Sarpsborg 08	2–2	Molde	Sarpsborg
17:00 CET (UTC+1)	Johansen 8' (pen.); Halvorsen 25'; Berget (yellow card) 45'	Report	Lund (yellow card) 6'; Brynhildsen 16'; Eriksen 22' (yellow card) 84'; Breivik (yellow card) 29'; Amundsen (yellow card) 87'	Stadium: Sarpsborg Stadion; Attendance: 4,274; Referee: Christian Moen

23 November 2024 29	Rosenborg	1–1	Sarpsborg 08	Trondheim
17:00 CET (UTC+1)	Dahl Reitan 90+2' (yellow card) 90+7'	Report	Sher (yellow card) 45+1'; Wichne (yellow card) 45+1'; Berget 90+4'; Nilsen Tangen (yellow card) 90+6'; Ødegaard (yellow card) 90+6'	Stadium: Lerkendal Stadion; Attendance: 13,222; Referee: Rohit Saggi

1 December 2024 30	Sarpsborg 08	2–1	Tromsø	Sarpsborg
17:00 CET (UTC+1)	Koch 30'; Guðjohnsen 90+2' (pen.)	Report	Haugaard (yellow card) 31'; Nordås 65'	Stadium: Sarpsborg Stadion; Attendance: 3,897; Referee: Sigurd Smehus Kringstad

=== Norwegian Football Cup ===
10 April 2024 First round	Sarpsborg FK	1–5	Sarpsborg 08	Sarpsborg
18:00 CEST (UTC+2)	Rahhaoui 4' (yellow card) 52'; Ferreira (yellow card) 73'	Report	Ngouali 77', 83'; Zekhnini (yellow card) 78' (goal) 88'; Meister 81'; Tebo 90+1'	Stadium: Kurland kunstgress Attendance: 1,197; Referee: Ole-Alexander Ekeli Valen

25 April 2024 Second round	Hønefoss	1–2	Sarpsborg 08	Hønefoss
18:00 CEST (UTC+2)	Pedersen 4'; Svensson (yellow card) 64'; Nestaker (yellow card) 87'	Report	Hiim 7'; Tebo (yellow card) 60'; Sandberg 67' (pen.); Halvorsen (yellow card) 75'	Stadium: Aka Arena; Attendance: 896; Referee: Jørgen Haugen

1 May 2024 Third round	Råde	0–1	Sarpsborg 08	Råde
18:00 CEST (UTC+2)	Latifi (yellow card) 45'; Kozica (yellow card) 66'; Guttulsrød (yellow card) 90+5'	Report	Andersen 62'; Meister (yellow card) 90+5'	Stadium: Råde idrettspark Attendance: 1,923; Referee: Daniel Higraff

8 May 2024 Fourth round	Molde	4–2	Sarpsborg 08	Molde
18:00 CEST (UTC+2)	Amundsen (yellow card) 38'; Eriksen 48'; Hagelskjær 74'; Eikrem 78'; Hestad 82'	Report	Reinhardsen 33'; Hiim (yellow card) 40'; Ørjasæter 49' (yellow card) 54' (yellow-red card) 65'; Wichne (yellow card) 76'; Zekhnini (yellow card) 87'	Stadium: Aker Stadion; Attendance: 2,083; Referee: Sivert Amland
