= 2023 Sarpsborg 08 FF season =

Sarpsborg 08
2023 season
- Chairman: Hans Petter Arnesen
- Head coach: Stefan Billborn
- Stadium: Sarpsborg Stadion
- Eliteserien: 8th
- Norwegian Cup: Quarter-finals
- Top goalscorer: League: Mikkel Maigaard (9); All: Kristian Opseth (14)
| Home colours | Away colours |

The 2023 season was Sarpsborg 08 FF's 15th season in existence and the club's 11th consecutive season in the top flight of Norwegian football. In addition to the domestic league, Sarpsborg 08 FF participated in this season's edition of the Norwegian Football Cup.

== Players ==
=== First team squad ===
As of 4 September 2023

Note: Flags indicate national team as defined under FIFA eligibility rules; some limited exceptions apply. Players may hold more than one non-FIFA nationality.

| No. | Pos. | Nation | Player |
|---|---|---|---|
| 1 | GK | NOR | Kjetil Haug (on loan from Toulouse) |
| 2 | MF | NOR | Elias Haug |
| 3 | DF | ESP | Arnau Casas |
| 4 | DF | NOR | Bjørn Inge Utvik |
| 5 | DF | NOR | Magnar Ødegaard |
| 6 | MF | NOR | Martin Høyland |
| 8 | MF | DEN | Jeppe Andersen |
| 10 | MF | SWE | Ramon Pascal Lundqvist |
| 11 | MF | SWE | Simon Tibbling |
| 12 | GK | NOR | Jarik Sundling |
| 14 | FW | NOR | Jo Inge Berget |
| 16 | DF | NOR | Joachim Thomassen |
| 17 | MF | NOR | Anders Hiim |
| 18 | MF | GAB | Serge-Junior Martinsson Ngouali |

| No. | Pos. | Nation | Player |
|---|---|---|---|
| 19 | FW | DEN | Henrik Meister |
| 20 | DF | NOR | Peter Reinhardsen |
| 21 | GK | NOR | Anders Kristiansen |
| 22 | FW | NOR | Kristian Opseth |
| 23 | MF | NOR | Niklas Sandberg |
| 25 | MF | DEN | Mikkel Maigaard |
| 29 | MF | DEN | Victor Torp |
| 31 | DF | DEN | Anton Skipper |
| 32 | DF | NOR | Eirik Wichne |
| 40 | GK | NOR | Leander Øy |
| 72 | MF | NOR | Sander Christiansen |
| 74 | FW | NOR | Aridon Racaj |
| 98 | MF | NOR | Rafik Zekhnini |
| — | DF | NGR | Franklin Tebo Uchenna |

=== Out on loan ===
Note: Flags indicate national team as defined under FIFA eligibility rules; some limited exceptions apply. Players may hold more than one non-FIFA nationality.

| No. | Pos. | Nation | Player |
|---|---|---|---|
| 1 | GK | NOR | Simen Vidtun Nilsen (on loan at Skeid) |
| 7 | FW | NOR | Martin Hoel Andersen (on loan at Kongsvinger) |
| — | FW | DEN | Gustav Mogensen (on loan at Hødd) |

== Transfers ==
=== Winter ===
In: Note: Flags indicate national team as defined under FIFA eligibility rules; some limited exceptions apply. Players may hold more than one non-FIFA nationality.

| No. | Pos. | Nation | Player |
|---|---|---|---|
| 3 | DF | NOR | Sigurd Kvile (on loan from Bodø/Glimt) |
| 7 | FW | NOR | Martin Hoel Andersen (from Kongsvinger) |
| 8 | MF | DEN | Jeppe Andersen (from (Sweden) Hammarby) |
| 10 | MF | SWE | Ramon Pascal Lundqvist (from (Netherlands) Groningen) |
| 12 | GK | NOR | Jarik Sundling (promoted from junior squad) |
| 14 | FW | MLI | Amadou Camara (loan return from (Senegal) Oslo FA) |
| 20 | DF | NOR | Peter Reinhardsen (from Start) |
| 77 | DF | NOR | Markus Olsvik Welinder (promoted from junior squad, previously on loan at Moss) |
| 90 | FW | GHA | Christopher Bonsu Baah (from (Ghana) Accra Shooting Stars) |

Out: Note: Flags indicate national team as defined under FIFA eligibility rules; some limited exceptions apply. Players may hold more than one non-FIFA nationality.

| No. | Pos. | Nation | Player |
|---|---|---|---|
| 1 | GK | NOR | Simen Vidtun Nilsen (on loan to Skeid) |
| 3 | DF | NOR | Jørgen Horn (to Gamle Oslo) |
| 7 | MF | NOR | Ole Jørgen Halvorsen (released) |
| 8 | FW | SWE | Guillermo Molins (released) |
| 10 | MF | MLI | Aboubacar Konté (to Fredrikstad) |
| 13 | MF | DEN | Anders Hagelskjær (loan return to (Denmark) AaB) |
| 19 | MF | SEN | Laurent Mendy (to Moss, previously on loan at (Senegal) Oslo FA) |
| 20 | MF | SWE | Anton Salétros (to (France) Caen) |
| 30 | FW | SWE | Gustav Engvall (loan return to (Belgium) Mechelen) |
| 41 | MF | NOR | Tobias Heintz (loan return to (Sweden) Häcken) |

=== Summer ===
In: Note: Flags indicate national team as defined under FIFA eligibility rules; some limited exceptions apply. Players may hold more than one non-FIFA nationality.

| No. | Pos. | Nation | Player |
|---|---|---|---|
| 1 | GK | NOR | Kjetil Haug (on loan from (France) Toulouse) |
| 3 | DF | ESP | Arnau Casas (from (Spain) Barcelona B) |
| 14 | MF | NOR | Jo Inge Berget (free transfer) |
| 17 | DF | NOR | Anders Hiim (from Sandnes Ulf) |
| 19 | FW | DEN | Henrik Meister (from (Denmark) Fremad Amager) |
| 23 | FW | NOR | Niklas Sandberg (from Viking) |
| 30 | DF | SWE | Franklin Tebo Uchenna (from (Sweden) Häcken) |
| 74 | FW | NOR | Aridon Racaj (loan return from Raufoss) |
| 98 | FW | NOR | Rafik Zekhnini (from Molde) |

Out: Note: Flags indicate national team as defined under FIFA eligibility rules; some limited exceptions apply. Players may hold more than one non-FIFA nationality.

| No. | Pos. | Nation | Player |
|---|---|---|---|
| 3 | DF | NOR | Sigurd Kvile (loan return to Bodø/Glimt) |
| 7 | FW | NOR | Martin Hoel Andersen (on loan to Kongsvinger) |
| 12 | GK | NOR | Jarik Sundling (on loan to Sogndal) |
| 15 | FW | NOR | Steffen Lie Skålevik (to Åsane) |
| 17 | DF | NOR | Joachim Soltvedt (to Brann) |
| 23 | FW | DEN | Gustav Mogensen (on loan to Hødd) |
| 26 | FW | BFA | Moubarack Compaoré (to (Denmark) Hobro) |
| 74 | FW | NOR | Aridon Racaj (on loan to Raufoss) |
| 77 | DF | NOR | Markus Olsvik Welinder (on loan to Kjelsås) |
| 90 | MF | GHA | Christopher Bonsu Baah (to (Belgium) Genk) |

== Pre-season and friendlies ==
Win Draw Loss Fixtures

| 18 March 2023 Friendly | Fredrikstad (Norway) | 0–1 | (Norway) Sarpsborg 08 | Fredrikstad |
| 14:00 CET (UTC+1) | | | Lundqvist 81' | Stadium: Fredrikstad Stadion |

| 25 March 2023 Friendly | IFK Göteborg (Sweden) | 1–1 | (Norway) Sarpsborg 08 | Gothenburg |
| 12:30 CET (UTC+1) | Norlin 29' | | Reinhardsen 25' | Stadium: Valhalla IP |

| 2 April 2023 Friendly | Sarpsborg 08 (Norway) | 2–1 | (Norway) Stabæk | Sarpsborg |
| 15:00 CEST (UTC+2) | Baah 54'; Soltvedt 78' | | Høgh 40' | Stadium: Sarpsborg Stadion |

== Competitions ==
=== Overview ===
| Competition | First match | Last match | Starting round | Final position | Record | | | | | | | |
| Competition | First match | Last match | Starting round | Final position | Pld | W | D | L | GF | GA | GD | Win % |
|---|---|---|---|---|---|---|---|---|---|---|---|---|
| Eliteserien | 10 April 2023 | 3 December 2023 | Matchday 1 | 8th | 30 | 12 | 5 | 13 | 55 | 52 | +3 | 40.00 |
| Norwegian Cup | 25 May 2023 | 12 July 2023 | First round | Quarter-finals | 5 | 4 | 0 | 1 | 16 | 11 | +5 | 80.00 |
| Total | | | | | 35 | 16 | 5 | 14 | 71 | 63 | +8 | 45.71 |

Last updated: 3 December 2023
Source: Soccerway

=== Eliteserien ===
==== League table ====
| Pos | Team | Pld | W | D | L | GF | GA | GD | Pts |
|---|---|---|---|---|---|---|---|---|---|
| 6 | Lillestrøm | 30 | 13 | 4 | 13 | 49 | 49 | 0 | 43 |
| 7 | Strømsgodset | 30 | 13 | 3 | 14 | 37 | 35 | +2 | 42 |
| 8 | Sarpsborg | 30 | 12 | 5 | 13 | 55 | 52 | +3 | 41 |
| 9 | Rosenborg | 30 | 11 | 6 | 13 | 46 | 50 | −4 | 39 |
| 10 | Odd | 30 | 10 | 8 | 12 | 42 | 44 | −2 | 38 |

Source: Football Association of Norway (in Norwegian)
Rules for classification: 1) Points; 2) Goal difference; 3) Goals scored; 4) Head-to-head points; 5) Head-to-head goal difference; 6) Head-to-head goals scored.

==== Results summary ====
| Overall | | | | | | | | Home | | | | | | Away | | | | | |
| Pld | W | D | L | GF | GA | GD | Pts | W | D | L | GF | GA | GD | W | D | L | GF | GA | GD |
|---|---|---|---|---|---|---|---|---|---|---|---|---|---|---|---|---|---|---|---|
| 30 | 12 | 5 | 13 | 55 | 52 | +3 | 41 | 8 | 2 | 5 | 35 | 24 | +11 | 4 | 3 | 8 | 20 | 28 | −8 |

Last updated: 3 December 2023.

==== Results by round ====
| Round | 1 | 2 | 3 | 4 | 5 | 6 | 7 | 8 | 9 | 10 | 11 | 12 | 13 | 14 | 15 | 16 | 17 | 18 | 19 | 20 | 21 | 22 | 23 | 24 | 25 | 26 | 27 | 28 | 29 | 30 |
|---|---|---|---|---|---|---|---|---|---|---|---|---|---|---|---|---|---|---|---|---|---|---|---|---|---|---|---|---|---|---|
| Ground | H | A | H | A | A | H | A | H | A | H | A | H | A | H | A | H | A | H | A | H | A | H | A | H | A | H | H | A | H | A |
| Result | L | W | D | D | D | W | W | W | L | L | W | W | L | W | L | W | L | L | W | W | L | W | D | W | L | D | W | L | L | L |
| Position | 14 | 9 | 9 | 11 | 9 | 7 | 3 | 2 | 5 | 6 | 6 | 4 | 6 | 7 | 8 | 7 | 9 | 9 | 7 | 7 | 7 | 6 | 7 | 6 | 7 | 7 | 7 | 7 | 7 | 8 |

A = Away; H = Home; W = Win; D = Draw; L = Loss

==== Matches ====
The league fixtures were announced on 9 December 2022.

| 10 April 2023 1 | Sarpsborg 08 | 0–2 | Bodø/Glimt | Sarpsborg |
| 17:00 CEST (UTC+2) | | Report | Sørli 5'; Grønbæk 13' | Stadium: Sarpsborg Stadion; Attendance: 6,932; Referee: Ola Hobber Nilsen |

| 16 April 2023 2 | Vålerenga | 0–2 | Sarpsborg 08 | Oslo |
| 19:15 CEST (UTC+2) | | Report | Opseth 60', 81' | Stadium: Intility Arena; Attendance: 9,060; Referee: Rohit Saggi |

| 23 April 2023 3 | Sarpsborg 08 | 0–0 | Odd | Sarpsborg |
| 17:00 CEST (UTC+2) | | Report | | Stadium: Sarpsborg Stadion; Attendance: 4,330; Referee: Svein Oddvar Moen |

| 30 April 2023 4 | Haugesund | 0–0 | Sarpsborg 08 | Haugesund |
| 17:00 CEST (UTC+2) | | Report | | Stadium: Haugesund Stadion; Attendance: 3,768; Referee: Jan Morten Tennøy |

| 7 May 2023 5 | Stabæk | 1–1 | Sarpsborg 08 | Bærum |
| 17:00 CEST (UTC+2) | Ngouali 90' (o.g.) | Report | Utvik 87' | Stadium: Nadderud Stadion; Attendance: 2,866; Referee: Sivert Amland |

| 13 May 2023 6 | Sarpsborg 08 | 2–1 | Brann | Sarpsborg |
| 17:00 CEST (UTC+2) | Maigaard 24'; J. Andersen 40' | Report | Finne 79' | Stadium: Sarpsborg Stadion; Attendance: 5,962; Referee: Marius Lien |

| 16 May 2023 7 | Lillestrøm | 1–2 | Sarpsborg 08 | Lillestrøm |
| 18:00 CEST (UTC+2) | Adams 90+4' | Report | Utvik 47'; Soltvedt 54' | Stadium: Åråsen Stadion; Attendance: 9,029; Referee: Espen Eskås |

| 29 May 2023 8 | Sarpsborg 08 | 3–1 | Aalesund | Sarpsborg |
| 17:00 CEST (UTC+2) | Bonsu Baah 19'; Soltvedt 36'; Utvik 68' | Report | Atanga 39' | Stadium: Sarpsborg Stadion; Attendance: 5,435; Referee: Svein Tore Sinnes |

| 4 June 2023 9 | Tromsø | 2–1 | Sarpsborg 08 | Tromsø |
| 17:00 CEST (UTC+2) | Vesterlund 73'; Traore 90+2' | Report | Torp 30' | Stadium: Romssa Arena; Attendance: 2,910; Referee: Kristoffer Hagenes |

| 11 June 2023 10 | Sarpsborg 08 | 1–3 | Viking | Sarpsborg |
| 17:00 CEST (UTC+2) | Maigaard 86' | Report | Tangen 13'; Brekalo 48'; Svendsen 90+2' | Stadium: Sarpsborg Stadion; Attendance: 4,847; Referee: Marius Lien |

| 25 June 2023 11 | Rosenborg | 0–3 | Sarpsborg 08 | Trondheim |
| 17:00 CEST (UTC+2) | | Report | Wichne 24'; Maigaard 22'; Opseth 45+3' | Stadium: Lerkendal Stadion; Attendance: 14,191; Referee: Marius Hansen Grøtta |

| 2 July 2023 12 | Sarpsborg 08 | 6–1 | Sandefjord | Sarpsborg |
| 17:00 CEST (UTC+2) | Opseth 10', 20'; Torp 11'; Soltvedt 51'; Lundqvist 67'; Wichne 79' | Report | Taaje 45+1' | Stadium: Sarpsborg Stadion; Attendance: 4,494; Referee: Rohit Saggi |

| 9 July 2023 13 | Strømsgodset | 5–2 | Sarpsborg 08 | Drammen |
| 17:00 CEST (UTC+2) | Brunes 4', 11'; Valsvik 23'; Stenevik 60'; Enersen 78' | Report | Torp 6'; Soltvedt 17' | Stadium: Marienlyst Stadion; Attendance: 5,129; Referee: Svein Tore Sinnes |

| 16 July 2023 14 | Sarpsborg 08 | 2–3 | HamKam | Sarpsborg |
| 17:00 CEST (UTC+2) | Ngouali 16'; Lundqvist 24' | Report | Udahl 8' (pen.); Norheim 36'; Onsrud 38' | Stadium: Sarpsborg Stadion; Attendance: 4,169; Referee: Jan Morten Tennøy |

| 22 July 2023 15 | Molde | 5–1 | Sarpsborg 08 | Molde |
| 18:00 CEST (UTC+2) | Kitolano 6', 17', 69'; Løvik 81'; Linnes 86' | Report | Lundqvist 42' | Stadium: Aker Stadion; Attendance: 8,335; Referee: Tore Hansen |

| 30 July 2023 16 | Sarpsborg 08 | 2–1 | Haugesund | Sarpsborg |
| 17:00 CEST (UTC+2) | Torp 52'; Utvik 79' | Report | Skipper 17' (o.g.) | Stadium: Sarpsborg Stadion; Attendance: 4,154; Referee: Espen Andreas Eskås |

| 6 August 2023 17 | Sandefjord | 5–1 | Sarpsborg 08 | Sandefjord |
| 17:00 CEST (UTC+2) | Nilsson 32', 80'; Nyenetue 45+2'; Al-Saed 74'; Taaje 90' | Report | Torp 1' | Stadium: Release Arena; Attendance: 3,082; Referee: Marius Lien |

| 12 August 2023 18 | Sarpsborg 08 | 1–2 | Strømsgodset | Sarpsborg |
| 18:00 CEST (UTC+2) | Opseth 12' | Report | Stengel 63' (pen.); Andersen 84' | Stadium: Sarpsborg Stadion; Attendance: 4,138; Referee: Svein Oddvar Moen |

| 19 August 2023 19 | Odd | 0–3 | Sarpsborg 08 | Skien |
| 18:00 CEST (UTC+2) | | Report | Maigaard 38', 53'; Meister 90+3' | Stadium: Skagerak Arena; Attendance: 4,373; Referee: Marius Hansen Grøtta |

| 26 August 2023 20 | Sarpsborg 08 | 4–0 | Tromsø | Sarpsborg |
| 18:00 CEST (UTC+2) | Maigaard 11'; Opseth 50'; Skålevik 77'; Sandberg 90+4' | Report | | Stadium: Sarpsborg Stadion; Attendance: 4,133; Referee: Ola Hobber Nilsen |

| 3 September 2023 21 | Brann | 1–0 | Sarpsborg 08 | Bergen |
| 17:00 CEST (UTC+2) | Heltne Nilsen 69' (pen.) | Report | | Stadium: Brann Stadion; Attendance: 11,603; Referee: Mohammad Usman Aslam |

| 17 September 2023 22 | Sarpsborg 08 | 3–1 | Lillestrøm | Sarpsborg |
| 17:00 CEST (UTC+2) | Christiansen 32'; Berget 40'; Ngouali 74' | Report | Lehne Olsen 62' | Stadium: Sarpsborg Stadion; Attendance: 5,498; Referee: Kristoffer Hagenes |

| 24 September 2023 23 | HamKam | 1–1 | Sarpsborg 08 | Hamar |
| 17:00 CEST (UTC+2) | Mawa 50' | Fotball.no | Torp 17' | Stadium: Briskeby Stadion; Attendance: 3,522; Referee: Kai Erik Stten |

| 8 October 2023 24 | Sarpsborg 08 | 5–2 | Rosenborg | Sarpsborg |
| 17:00 CEST (UTC+2) | Lundqvist 41', 77' (pen.); Berget 57', 80', 88' | Report | Frederiksen 50'; Sæter 62' (pen.) | Stadium: Sarpsborg Stadion; Attendance: 8,022; Referee: Espen Eskås |

| 22 October 2023 25 | Aalesund | 3–2 | Sarpsborg 08 | Ålesund |
| 17:00 CEST (UTC+2) | Karlsbakk 38' (pen.); Kristensen 40'; Moses 90+1' | Report | Diop 23' (o.g.); Maigaard 43' | Stadium: Color Line Stadion; Attendance: 4,348; Referee: Svein Tore Sinnes |

| 29 October 2023 26 | Sarpsborg 08 | 2–2 | Stabæk | Sarpsborg |
| 17:00 CET (UTC+1) | Lundqvist 30'; Fardal Opseth 78' | Report | Ottesen 47'; Vinge 84' | Stadium: Sarpsborg Stadion; Attendance: 4,623; Referee: Daniel Higraff |

| 5 November 2023 27 | Sarpsborg 08 | 3–2 | Vålerenga | Sarpsborg |
| 17:00 CET (UTC+1) | Maigaard 7', 41'; Sandberg 30' | Report | Ilić 26'; Kiil Olsen 81' | Stadium: Sarpsborg Stadion; Attendance: 4,623; Referee: Daniel Higraff |

| 12 November 2023 28 | Viking | 2–1 | Sarpsborg 08 | Stavanger |
| 17:00 CET (UTC+1) | Adegbenro 55', 72' | Report | Zekhnini 15' | Stadium: Viking Stadion; Attendance: 11,425; Referee: Kristoffer Hagenes |

| 26 November 2023 29 | Sarpsborg 08 | 1–3 | Molde | Sarpsborg |
| 17:00 CET (UTC+1) | Sandberg 90' | Report | Løvik 1'; Haugen 44'; Ødegård 50' | Stadium: Sarpsborg Stadion; Attendance: 3,574; Referee: Mohammad Usman Aslam |

| 3 December 2023 30 | Bodø/Glimt | 2–0 | Sarpsborg 08 | Bodø |
| 17:00 CEST (UTC+1) | Pellegrino 20'; Žugelj 75' | Report | | Stadium: Aspmyra Stadion; Attendance: 6,234; Referee: Marius Hansen Grøtta |

=== Norwegian Football Cup ===
| 25 May 2023 First round | Fu/Vo | 1–3 | Sarpsborg 08 | Oppåkermoen |
| 18:00 CEST (UTC+2) | Karlsen 6' | Report | Skålevik 28'; Soltvedt 42'; Opseth 58' (pen.) | Stadium: Funnefoss Stadion; Attendance: 300; Referee: Stian Røvig Sletner |

| 1 June 2023 Second round | Frigg | 3–5 (a.e.t.) | Sarpsborg 08 | Oslo |
| 18:00 CEST (UTC+2) | Krohg 11'; Nomell 32'; Antonsen-Meløy 40' | Report | M. H. Andersen 21', 43'; Opseth 46'; Tibbling 112', 115' | Stadium: Tørteberg kunstgress Attendance: 396; Referee: Jørgen Haugen |

| 7 June 2023 Third round | Sarpsborg 08 | 3–1 | Odd | Sarpsborg |
| 18:00 CEST (UTC+2) | Opseth 42'; Jakobsen 45+1'; Overgaard 79' | Report | Midtskogen 78' | Stadium: Sarpsborg Stadion; Attendance: 1,867; Referee: Ola Hobber Nilsen |

| 28 June 2023 Fourth round | Sogndal | 3–4 | Sarpsborg 08 | Sogndalsfjøra |
| 18:00 CEST (UTC+2) | Jónsson 32'; Twum 42'; Flo 66' | Report | Opseth 10', 73', 82'; Flo 89' (o.g.) | Stadium: Fosshaugane Campus; Referee: Mohammad Usman Aslam |

| 12 July 2023 Quarter-finals | Molde | 3–1 | Sarpsborg 08 | Molde |
| 18:00 CEST (UTC+2) | Kitolano 1'; Breivik 5'; Brynhildsen 35' | Report | Lundqvist 73' | Stadium: Aker Stadion; Attendance: 3,752; Referee: Ola Hobber Nilsen |
