= 2026 Sarpsborg 08 FF season =

Sarpsborg 08
2026 season
- Chairman: Hans Petter Arnesen
- Head coach: Even Sel
- Stadium: Sarpsborg Stadion
- Eliteserien: 8th
- 2025–26 Norwegian Cup: Fourth round
- 2026–27 Norwegian Cup: Pre-season
Home colours	Away colours

The 2026 season is the 18th season in the history of Sarpsborg 08 Fotballforening and the 14th consecutive season in the Eliteserien. In addition, Sarpsborg 08 will participate in the 2026–27 Norwegian Football Cup. The team also completed its participation in the 2025–26 Norwegian Football Cup, where it was eliminated in the fourth round.

== Transfers ==
=== In ===
Pos.	Player	Transferred from	Fee	Date	Source
GK	(Finland) Carljohan Eriksson	(Norway) Sandefjord	Loan return	31 December 2025	
DF	(Burundi) Claus Niyukuri	(Norway) Haugesund		22 January 2026	
FW	(Sweden) Noa Williams	(Norway) Kongsvinger		6 February 2026	
DF	(Ivory Coast) Claus Niyukuri	(Azerbaijan) Qarabağ FK		13 March 2026	
MF	(Norway) Harald Nilsen Tangen	(England) Notts County	Loan return	30 June 2026	

=== Out ===
Pos.	Player	Transferred to	Fee	Date	Source
GK	(Norway) Tord Flolid	(Norway) Sandnes Ulf	Loan return	31 December 2025	
DF	(Iraq) Mohanad Jeahze	(Iraq) Duhok	End of contract	1 January 2026	
MF	(Norway) Harald Nilsen Tangen	(England) Notts County	Loan	26 January 2026	
MF	(Ivory Coast) Chris Kouakou	(Israel) Ironi Tiberias	Undisclosed	1 July 2026	

== Pre-season and friendlies ==
24 January 2026 Friendly	GAIS (Sweden)	4–1	(Norway) Sarpsborg 08

1 February 2026 Friendly	Sarpsborg 08 (Norway)	3–0	(Sweden) Östers IF

5 February 2026 Friendly	Sirius (Sweden)	2–3	(Norway) Sarpsborg 08

6 February 2026 Friendly	Sarpsborg 08 (Norway)	3–1	(Norway) Moss

13 February 2026 Friendly	HamKam (Norway)	2–3	(Norway) Sarpsborg 08

19 February 2026 Friendly	Sarpsborg 08 (Norway)	2–0	(Czech Republic) Zbrojovka Brno

25 February 2026 Friendly	Kristiansund (Norway)	0–1	(Norway) Sarpsborg 08

1 March 2026 Friendly	Viking (Norway)	2–0	(Norway) Sarpsborg 08

26 March 2026 Friendly	Sarpsborg 08 (Norway)	2–2	(Norway) HamKam

28 June 2026 Friendly	Rosenborg (Norway)	v	(Norway) Sarpsborg 08	Ullensaker
15:00				Stadium: Jessheim Stadion
Note: The match was canceled due to travel complications.

3 July 2026 Friendly	Lillestrøm (Norway)	3–1	(Norway) Sarpsborg 08	Lillestrøm
12:00	Nyheim 11', 36'; Drammeh 28'		18'

== Competitions ==
=== Overall record ===
Competition	First match	Last match	Starting round	Final position	Record							
Competition	First match	Last match	Starting round	Final position	Pld	W	D	L	GF	GA	GD	Win %
Eliteserien	22 March 2026		Matchday 1		11	4	2	5	13	16	−3	36.36
2025–26 Norwegian Football Cup	8 March 2026		Fourth round	Fourth round	1	0	0	1	1	2	−1	0.00
2026–27 Norwegian Football Cup					0	0	0	0	0	0	+0	—
Total					12	4	2	6	14	18	−4	33.33

Last updated: 29 May 2026
Source: Competitions

=== Eliteserien ===
Pos	Team	Pld	W	D	L	GF	GA	GD	Pts
5	Molde	11	6	1	4	18	13	+5	19
6	HamKam	10	5	2	3	17	16	+1	17
7	Sarpsborg	11	4	2	5	13	16	−3	14
8	Sandefjord	11	4	2	5	10	13	−3	14
9	Vålerenga	11	4	2	5	13	17	−4	14

Updated to match(es) played on 30 May 2026. Source: Football Association of Norway (in Norwegian)
Rules for classification: 1) Points; 2) Goal difference; 3) Goals scored; 4) Head-to-head points; 5) Head-to-head goal difference; 6) Head-to-head goals scored.

==== Results summary ====
Overall								Home						Away					
Pld	W	D	L	GF	GA	GD	Pts	W	D	L	GF	GA	GD	W	D	L	GF	GA	GD
11	4	2	5	13	16	−3	14	2	2	1	6	5	+1	2	0	4	7	11	−4

Last updated: 29 May 2026.

==== Results by round ====
Round	1	2	3	4	5	6	7	8	9	10	11
Ground	H	A	H	A	H	A	A	H	A	H	A
Result	D	W	D	L	L	L	L	W	L	W	W
Position											

Updated to match(es) played on 29 May 2026. Source:
A = Away; H = Home; W = Win; D = Draw; L = Loss

==== Matches ====
The match schedule was issued on 19 December 2025.

22 March 2026 2	Sandefjord	0–2	Sarpsborg 08

6 April 2026 3	Sarpsborg 08	1–1	Start

12 April 2026 4	Rosenborg	2–1	Sarpsborg 08

15 April 2026 1	Sarpsborg 08	1–1	Bodø/Glimt

19 April 2026 5	Sarpsborg 08	0–1	Tromsø

26 April 2026 6	KFUM Oslo	1–0	Sarpsborg 08

3 May 2026 7	Lillestrøm	4–0	Sarpsborg 08

9 May 2026 8	Sarpsborg 08	2–1	Fredrikstad

16 May 2026 9	Vålerenga	3–2	Sarpsborg 08

25 May 2026 10	Sarpsborg 08	2–1	Molde

29 May 2026 11	Brann	1–2	Sarpsborg 08	Bergen
19:00				Stadium: Brann Stadion

=== Norwegian Football Cup ===
==== 2025–26 ====
8 March 2026 Fourth round	Fredrikstad	2–1	Sarpsborg 08

==== 2026–27 ====
22–23 August 2026 First round	Sparta Sarpsborg	v	Sarpsborg 08
