= Franklin Tebo Uchenna =

Nigerian footballer

Personal information
- Full name: Franklin Degaulle Tebo Uchenna
- Date of birth: 15 January 2000 (age 26)
- Place of birth: Abuja, Nigeria
- Height: 1.92 m (6 ft 4 in)
- Position: Centre-back

Team information
- Current team: Red Star Belgrade
- Number: 30

Youth career
- FC Digital Foot
- Waco Academy
- 2018–2019: Abuja

Senior career*
Years	Team	Apps	(Gls)
2019–2021	Nasarawa United	37	(0)
2021	→ Häcken (loan)	5	(0)
2022–2023	Häcken	16	(0)
2023–2025	Sarpsborg 08	52	(4)
2025–	Red Star Belgrade	22	(1)

International career^{‡}
2021	Nigeria	1	(0)
- * Club domestic league appearances and goals as of 18 October 2026 ‡ National team caps and goals as of 11 July 2022

Franklin Degaulle Tebo Uchenna (born 15 January 2000) is a Nigerian professional footballer who plays as a centre-back for Serbian SuperLiga club Red Star Belgrade. He was named the best centre back in Scandinavia last season.

== Club career ==
Tebo Uchenna is a product of the youth academies of FC Digital Foot, Waco Academy and Abuja before beginning his senior career with Nasarawa United in 2019. On 7 August 2021, he transferred to the Swedish club Häcken. He made his professional debut with Häcken in a 1–1 Allsvenskan tie with Hammarby on 26 September 2021. Originally signed on loan, Häcken activated the buyout clause in the winter of 2022.

On 31 August 2023, Tebo Uchenna moved to Norway to play for Sarpsborg 08 in Eliteserien. He made a four-year contract.

On 15 August 2025, Tebo Uchenna joined Serbian SuperLiga side Red Star Belgrade on a three-year deal with an option for a fourth.

== International career ==
Tebo Uchenna represented the Nigeria national team in a friendly 4–0 loss to Mexico on 4 July 2021, coming on as a substitute in the 66th minute.

== Career statistics ==
=== Club ===
As of match played 10 October 2026

Appearances and goals by club, season and competition
Club	Season	League			National cup		Continental		Other		Total	
Club	Season	Division	Apps	Goals	Apps	Goals	Apps	Goals	Apps	Goals	Apps	Goals
Nasarawa United	2019–20	Nigeria Premier Football League	9	0	—		—		—		9	0
Nasarawa United	2020–21	Nigeria Premier Football League	29	0	—		—		—		29	0
Nasarawa United	Total		38	0	—		—		—		38	0
BK Häcken (loan)	2021	Allsvenskan	5	0	0	0	—		—		5	0
BK Häcken	2022	Allsvenskan	9	0	2	0	—		—		11	0
BK Häcken	2023	Allsvenskan	7	0	1	0	5 (Note: Three appearances in UEFA Champions League, two appearances in UEFA Europa League)	0	—		13	0
BK Häcken	Total		16	0	3	0	5	0	—		24	0
Sarpsborg 08	2023	Eliteserien	9	0	0	0	—		—		9	0
Sarpsborg 08	2024	Eliteserien	27	3	4	1	—		—		31	4
Sarpsborg 08	2025	Eliteserien	16	1	4	0	—		—		20	1
Sarpsborg 08	Total		52	4	8	1	—		—		60	5
Red Star Belgrade	2025–26	Serbian SuperLiga	17	1	4	1	7 (Note: Appearances in UEFA Europa League)	1	—		28	3
Red Star Belgrade	2026–27	Serbian SuperLiga	2	0	0	0	2 (Note: Two appearances in UEFA Europa League)	0	—		4	0
Red Star Belgrade	Total		19	1	4	1	9	1	—		32	3
Career total			130	5	15	2	14	1	0	0	159	8

=== International ===
As of match played 4 July 2021

Appearances and goals by national team and year
National team	Year	Apps	Goals
Nigeria	2021	1	0
Total		1	0

== Honours ==
Red Star

- Serbian SuperLiga: 2025–26
- Serbian Cup: 2025–26
