= Foyston =

Foyston is a surname. Notable people with the surname include:

- Frank Foyston (1891–1966), Canadian ice hockey player and coach
- Martin Foyston (born 1982), English football manager
