= Niklas Sandberg (Norwegian footballer) =

Norwegian footballer

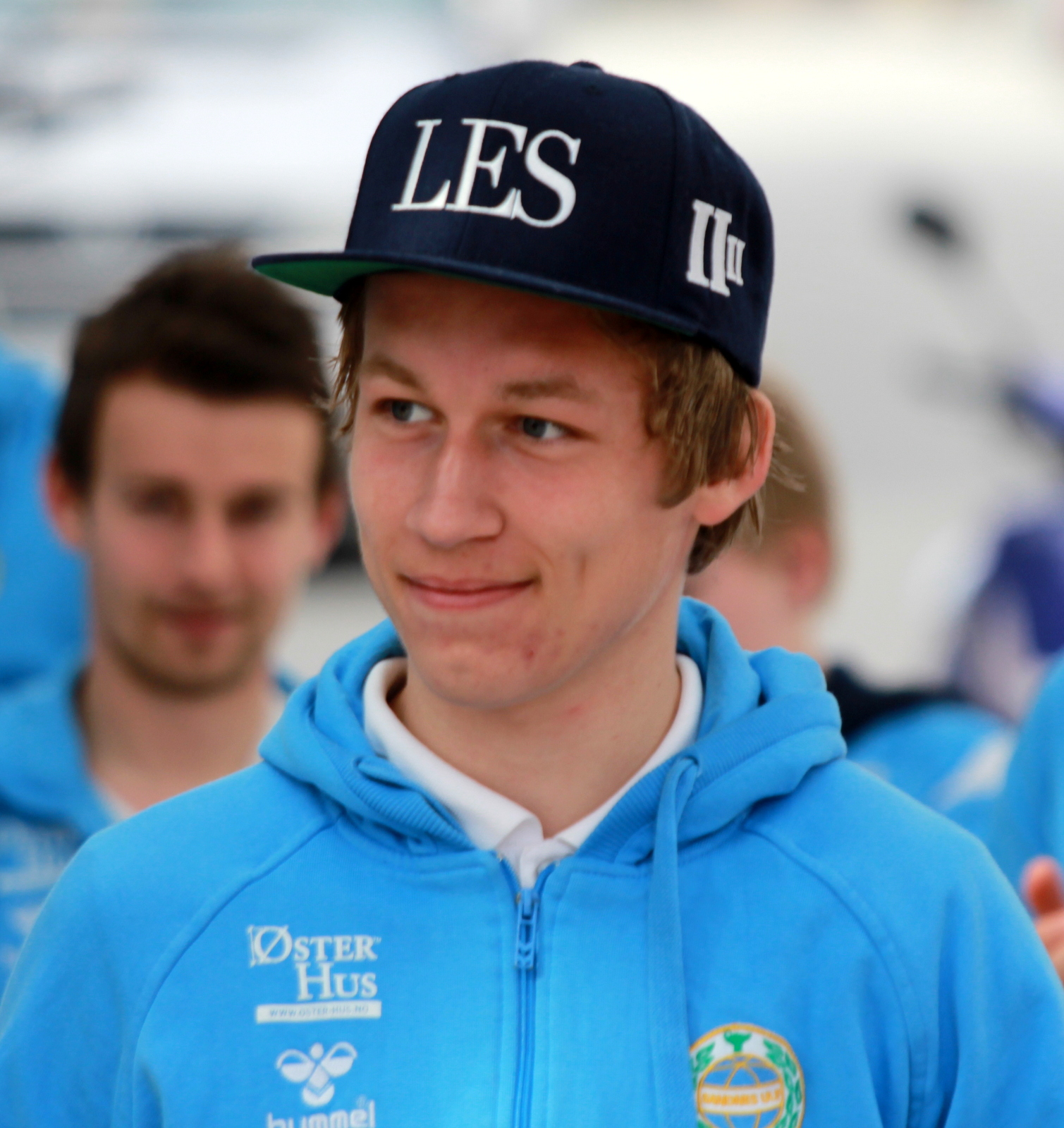
- Sandberg in 2014

Personal information
- Date of birth: 18 May 1995 (age 31)
- Place of birth: Sandnes, Norway
- Height: 1.83 m (6 ft 0 in)
- Position: Midfielder

Team information
- Current team: Haugesund
- Number: 11

Youth career
- Lura
- Sandnes Ulf

Senior career*
Years	Team	Apps	(Gls)
2014–2017	Sandnes Ulf	18	(0)
2015	→ Sola (loan)	13	(6)
2016	→ Nest-Sotra (loan)	10	(1)
2017–2018	Ullensaker/Kisa	27	(11)
2018	Start	15	(0)
2019–2021	Haugesund	71	(16)
2022–2023	Viking	35	(4)
2023–2026	Sarpsborg 08	38	(6)
2026–	Haugesund	30	(9)
- * Club domestic league appearances and goals as of 14 November 2026

Niklas Sandberg (born 18 May 1995) is a Norwegian professional footballer who plays as a midfielder for Norwegian First Division side Haugesund.

== Career ==
He started his youth career in Lura, but later joined the city's major team Sandnes Ulf. He made his senior debut in 2014. After not being able to establish himself in the first team, he moved to Ull/Kisa in January 2017. He finished the 2017 First Division season with 11 goals and 10 assists. In April 2018, he joined Eliteserien club Start. He made his Eliteserien debut on 9 April 2018 against Lillestrøm. In January 2019, he signed a four-year contract with Haugesund. In January 2021, Viking tried to sign Sandberg, but Haugesund did not want to sell him. One year later, in January 2022, Viking succeeded in their attempt to sign Sandberg. He signed a four-year contract with the club. On 12 March 2022, he made his debut for Viking in a 2–0 cup win against Kongsvinger. One week later, Viking won 5–0 against KFUM Oslo and Sandberg scored two of the goals.

== Personal life ==
He hails from Sandnes, and is the son of former athletes Richard Sandberg Hansen and Anne Brit Skjæveland; his mother was even an Olympian. His twin brother Joachim is an athlete.

== Career statistics ==
As of match played 26 August 2026

Appearances and goals by club, season and competition
Club	Season	League			National Cup		Other		Total	
Club	Season	Division	Apps	Goals	Apps	Goals	Apps	Goals	Apps	Goals
Sandnes Ulf	2014	Eliteserien	4	0	0	0	–		4	0
Sandnes Ulf	2015	1. divisjon	4	0	1	0	–		5	0
Sandnes Ulf	2016	1. divisjon	10	0	3	0	–		13	0
Sandnes Ulf	Total		18	0	4	0	–		22	0
Sola (loan)	2015	2. divisjon	13	6	0	0	–		13	6
Nest-Sotra (loan)	2016	2. divisjon	10	1	0	0	–		10	1
Ullensaker/Kisa	2017	1. divisjon	26	11	3	3	1 (Note: Appearance in Eliteserien play-offs)	0	30	14
Ullensaker/Kisa	2018	1. divisjon	1	0	0	0	–		1	0
Ullensaker/Kisa	Total		27	11	3	3	1	0	31	14
Start	2018	Eliteserien	15	0	6	1	–		21	1
Haugesund	2019	Eliteserien	19	6	6	2	6 (Note: Appearances in UEFA Europa League)	2	31	10
Haugesund	2020	Eliteserien	24	7	–		–		24	7
Haugesund	2021	Eliteserien	28	3	1	0	–		29	3
Haugesund	Total		71	16	7	2	6	2	84	20
Viking	2022	Eliteserien	24	2	6	3	6 (Note: Appearances in UEFA Europa Conference League)	1	36	6
Viking	2023	Eliteserien	11	2	3	2	–		14	4
Viking	Total		35	4	9	5	6	1	50	10
Sarpsborg 08	2023	Eliteserien	11	3	0	0	–		11	3
Sarpsborg 08	2024	Eliteserien	16	3	3	1	–		19	4
Sarpsborg 08	2025	Eliteserien	11	0	4	0	–		15	0
Sarpsborg 08	Total		38	6	7	1	–		45	7
Haugesund	2026	Norwegian First Division	30	9	3	2	–		20	6
Career total			254	52	39	14	13	3	306	70
