= Noa Williams =

Swedish footballer (born 2005)

Personal information
- Full name: Noa Oliver Williams
- Date of birth: 27 November 2001 (age 24)
- Height: 1.77 m (5 ft 10 in)
- Position: Winger

Team information
- Current team: Sarpsborg 08
- Number: 17

Youth career
- –2019: Hammarby IF
- 2019: IK Brage

Senior career*
| Years | Team | Apps | (Gls) |
| 2020–2021 | IK Brage | 37 | (2) |
| 2021–2023 | Fredrikstad | 52 | (4) |
| 2023 | → Skeid (loan) | 12 | (2) |
| 2024–2025 | Kongsvinger | 53 | (15) |
| 2026– | Sarpsborg 08 | 13 | (0) |

International career^{‡}
| 2017 | Sweden U16 | 3 | (0) |
- * Club domestic league appearances and goals as of 23 July 2026 ‡ National team caps and goals as of 3 December 2025

Noa Williams (born 27 November 2001) is a Swedish footballer who plays as a winger for Sarpsborg 08.

== Career ==
He started his career in Hammarby IF, last playing for them in the P19 Allsvenskan in the summer of 2019. He was capped three times for Sweden U16 in 2017.

Not getting a contract with Hammarby's senior team, he moved north to start his senior career in IK Brage in 2020. He scored his first goal in July and became known as a creative player. Here he was discovered by a scout from Fredrikstad FK and moved to the Norwegian second-tier club in late July 2021.

In the summer of 2023, Williams was loaned out to stragglers Skeid. Despite Williams having "excelled at times", he would have to take a detour to develop better, in light of "the way the season has progressed". Skeid were soon relegated, but Williams was noted for a nutmeg and assist against Sandnes Ulf. After Fredrikstad's manager decided that Williams did not fit into his desired playing style, the "popular" player was sold to Kongsvinger IL ahead of the 2024 season.

In the summer of 2025, Williams was the subject of transfer speculation. Amid interest from Norwegian clubs, media reported that Kongsvinger rejected a bid from BK Häcken worth 10 million kr (9.4 million kr). His contract lasting until the end of 2027, it looked probable that he might move in the winter of 2026. In November, a bid from Malmö FF was reportedly rejected.

However on 6 February 2026, Williams joined Eliteserien side Sarpsborg on a four-year contract.

== Personal life ==
He is a son of a Korean adoptee to Sweden and a Welsh father.

In Kongsvinger, he lived together with Tilde Modin Cato.

In 2022, Williams was mugged at knifepoint in downtown Fredrikstad.
