= Alagie Sanyang =

Gambian footballer (born 1997)

Personal information
- Date of birth: 11 September 1996 (age 30)
- Place of birth: The Gambia
- Height: 1.85 m (6 ft 1 in)
- Position: Striker

Team information
- Current team: Stabæk
- Number: 9

Youth career
- –2012: Teie

Senior career*
Years	Team	Apps	(Gls)
2013–2016	FK Tønsberg	75	(18)
2017–2018	Asker	45	(7)
2019	Moss	23	(11)
2020–2021	KFUM	58	(17)
2022–2024	Start	45	(13)
2024–2026	Sarpsborg 08	26	(0)
2026–	Stabæk	24	(8)
- * Club domestic league appearances and goals as of 14 November 2026

Alagie Sanyang (born 11 September 1996) is a Gambian professional footballer who plays as a striker for Norwegian First Division club Stabæk.

== Personal life ==
Sanyang was born in The Gambia, but migrated to Europe with his family. Reaching Sweden, they moved on to finally settle in Norway. Sanyang later stated that he needed to get away from an environment marked by "party and drugs". He is a Muslim.

Sanyang played for Teie IF as a child, and trained with other talents in Vestfold, including Markus Brændsrød, André Sødlund and Lars Herlofsen.

== Career ==
After leaving Teie in 2013 for FK Tønsberg, Sanyang made his senior debut in the 2. divisjon in June 2013. He scored his first league goal in May 2014, albeit in the 3. divisjon after FK Tønsberg was relegated. He helped win promotion to the 2016 2. divisjon, where he attracted the interest of others. In 2017 he was signed by Asker, who replaced Sindre Mauritz-Hansen with Sanyang, Balal Arezou and Riki Alba.

After one season in Moss FK, where he scored 12 goals in 25 goals (league and cup), he was signed by 1. divisjon team KFUM in 2020. Following the postponed start to the 2020 season, Sanyang scored his first 1. divisjon goal in July 2020. He proceeded to become KFUM's internal top goalscorer in 2021, and was rumoured to be on the radar for Eliteserien clubs. The transfer took place, but the target was another second-tier club, IK Start.

Using 2022 to adjust, his goalscoring picked up in 2023 with 5 goals in the first 9 games. Sanyang was also noted for a sometime-haphazard playing style, with several tackles being described as horrendous. One happened against Alexander Håpnes in the league, which knocked Håpnes unconscious, another situation came in a cup game in March 2023, when Sanyang was sent off for kicking a player who was lying down.

However, as a team Start stagnated, so in 2024 Sanyang expressed his wish to move on to another club. He was reportedly wanted by Kristiansund BK. With his age nearing 28, he finally got the chance in Eliteserien when Sarpsborg 08 bought him out of his contract in the summer window of 2024. At the time of his transfer, he was injured until September.
