= Daniel Karlsbakk =

Norwegian footballer (born 2003)

Personal information
- Full name: Daniel Seland Karlsbakk
- Date of birth: 7 April 2003 (age 23)
- Place of birth: Kristiansand, Norway
- Height: 1.96 m (6 ft 5 in)
- Position: Forward

Team information
- Current team: Sarpsborg 08
- Number: 11

Youth career
- 2009–2019: Bryne

Senior career*
Years	Team	Apps	(Gls)
2019–2021	Bryne	30	(5)
2022–2023	Viking	21	(2)
2023–2025	Heerenveen	35	(1)
2025–	Sarpsborg 08	52	(25)

International career^{‡}
2019	Norway U16	5	(0)
2020	Norway U17	4	(2)
2021	Norway U18	1	(0)
2022	Norway U19	3	(1)
2022–2023	Norway U21	10	(1)
- * Club domestic league appearances and goals as of 29 October 2026 ‡ National team caps and goals as of 7 December 2025

Daniel Seland Karlsbakk (born 7 April 2003) is a Norwegian professional footballer who plays as a forward for Eliteserien club Sarpsborg 08.

== Career ==
=== Bryne and Viking ===
Karlsbakk began his career in 2009 by joining hometown club Bryne's youth academy, which led to him signing his first professional contract with the club in April 2019. He made his senior debut on 26 October 2019. He suffered an ankle injury in June 2021 while attempting a backflip, which kept him out of action for much of the following season.

On 7 December 2021, Karlsbakk signed a three-year contract with Viking. He made his competitive debut for the club on 21 April 2022 in a Norwegian Football Cup match against Bodø/Glimt and scored his first goal for the club against Haugesund on 25 June 2022.

=== SC Heerenveen ===
On 31 January 2023, following the transfer of forward Amin Sarr to Olympique Lyon, Karlsbakk signed a contract with Heerenveen until 2026. He made his debut for the club on 7 February 2023 in the KNVB Cup against NAC Breda and five days later, he made his Eredivisie debut, coming on as a substitute against Feyenoord. Later that year, on 20 August, he scored his first goal for the club in a 2–0 away win over FC Utrecht.

=== Sarpsborg 08 ===
On 10 January 2025, Karlsbakk returned to Norway to sign for Sarpsborg 08. He went on to finish as the 2025 Eliteserien's top scorer with 18 goals in his first season with the club.

== Personal life ==
He is a son of former footballer Eivind Karlsbakk. Karlsbakk has compared himself to fellow Brynebu Erling Haaland, claiming that they both possess the same power in their game, which they acquired from their upbringing in Bryne. Additionally, they shared a similar diet including forcemeat.

As his father Eivind Karlsbakk reached the 1995 Norwegian Football Cup final, but lost, so did Daniel Karlsbakk in 2025.

== Career statistics ==
As of match played 28 October 2026

Appearances and goals by club, season and competition
Club	Season	League			National cup (Note: Includes Norwegian Football Cup, KNVB Cup)		Europe		Total	
Club	Season	Division	Apps	Goals	Apps	Goals	Apps	Goals	Apps	Goals
Bryne	2019	Second Division	1	0	0	0	—		1	0
Bryne	2020	Second Division	18	2	—		—		18	2
Bryne	2021	First Division	11	3	0	0	—		11	3
Bryne	Total		30	5	0	0	0	0	30	5
Viking	2022	Eliteserien	21	2	3	0	6 (Note: Appearances in UEFA Europa Conference League)	0	30	2
Heerenveen	2022–23	Eredivisie	12	0	1	0	—		13	0
Heerenveen	2023–24	Eredivisie	16	1	1	1	—		17	2
Heerenveen	2024–25	Eredivisie	7	0	1	0	—		8	0
Heerenveen	Total		35	1	3	1	0	0	38	2
Sarpsborg 08	2025	Eliteserien	28	18	5	3	—		33	21
Sarpsborg 08	2026	Eliteserien	24	7	2	2	—		26	9
Sarpsborg 08	Total		52	25	7	5	0	0	59	30
Career total			136	33	13	6	6	0	156	39

== Honours ==
Individual

- Eliteserien top scorer: 2025
