= Mamour Ndiaye =

Senegalese footballer

Personal information
- Date of birth: 22 October 2005 (age 21)
- Place of birth: Dakar, Senegal
- Height: 1.90 m (6 ft 3 in)
- Position: Goalkeeper

Team information
- Current team: Saint-Étienne
- Number: 1

Youth career
- –2023: Oslo Football Academy

Senior career*
Years	Team	Apps	(Gls)
2023–2026	Sarpsborg 08	39	(0)
2026–	Saint-Étienne	5	(0)

International career^{‡}
2023	Senegal U20	4	(0)
- * Club domestic league appearances and goals as of 12 July 2026 ‡ National team caps and goals as of 27 May 2023

Mamour Ndiaye (born 22 October 2005) is a Senegalese footballer who plays as a goalkeeper for French Ligue 2 club Saint-Étienne.

He grew up in Dakar. Ndiaye was discovered in Senegal, being coached by Tor Thodesen in Oslo Football Academy, and went on trial with Norwegian club Sarpsborg 08 in 2023. At the start of the 2023–24 winter break, he signed for Sarpsborg 08 on a contract lasting until the end of 2027. The club described his prospects as "enormous".

Representing Senegalese youth national teams, he played three matches at the 2023 FIFA U-20 World Cup and was in the Senegalese squad that won the 2023 U-20 Africa Cup of Nations. Following the 2025 U-20 Africa Cup of Nations qualification he received the Golden Glove, the Goalkeeper of the Tournament award. He also emerged with a considerable social media presence, gaining "millions of views", especially in his homecountry.

In Norway, as most Africans, he saw snow for the first time. Following a lengthy adaptation period, Ndiaye emerged as Sarpsborg 08's number one choice for the 2025 Eliteserien. He made his debut on 30 March against Molde, keeping a clean sheet. Teammate Sondre Holmlund Ørjasæter called him one of the greatest goalkeeper talents in the world, adding "Just wait!".

On 10 July 2026, Ndiaye signed a four-season contract with Saint-Étienne in France.
