= Anders Hiim =

Norwegian footballer (born 2003)

Personal information
- Date of birth: 13 September 2002 (age 24)
- Position: Defender

Team information
- Current team: Sarpsborg 08
- Number: 21

Youth career
- –2017: Bogafjell
- 2018–2021: Viking
- 2021: Sandnes Ulf

Senior career*
Years	Team	Apps	(Gls)
2021	Bogafjell		
2022–2023	Sandnes Ulf	46	(1)
2023–	Sarpsborg 08	53	(1)

International career
2022	Norway U20	1	(0)
2023	Norway U21	2	(0)
- * Club domestic league appearances and goals as of 23 July 2026

Anders Hiim (born 13 September 2002) is a Norwegian footballer who plays as a left back for Sarpsborg 08.

== Personal life ==
He is a son of Svein Arne Hiim, who player for Viking FK in Norway's highest league in the 1980s. His sister Maria Hiim made her Toppserien debut for Klepp in 2014. She played for Klepp as well as Norway U16, U17, U19 and U23 until 2017, finishing her career with two years in Røa.

== Career ==
Hiim grew up in Sandnes and started out in the local club Bogafjell IL. When he turned 16, Bogafjell could not field a full team anymore, so Hiim went to the academy of regional giants Viking FK. According to himself, he lost motivation during the initial COVID-19 pandemic in Norway, and ultimately quit Viking in 2021. Instead, he decided on doing military service. Starting the program to become a paratrooper in Rena Camp, he had to quit this endeavour because of an allergic reaction. Hiim then moved home and rejoined Bogafjell which had a senior team in the Fifth Division, the sixth tier of Norwegian football. However, after a few games, he decided to make a last-ditch effort on top-level football and joined the youth team of Sandnes Ulf. Shortly after, in December 2021, he was contracted to the senior team.

He quickly became a regular in 2022 and also made his international debut for Norway U20, followed by Norway U21 in 2023.

A summer transfer to SK Brann was rumoured, together with unnamed foreign clubs. He was ultimately purchased by Sarpsborg 08 FF, as a replacement for Joachim Soltvedt whom Brann had landed on buying.

=== Career statistics ===
As of match played on 15 September 2024

Club statistics
Club	Season	League			National Cup		Continental		Other		Total	
Club	Season	Division	Apps	Goals	Apps	Goals	Apps	Goals	Apps	Goals	Apps	Goals
Sandnes Ulf	2021	First Division	0	0	2	0	—		—		2	0
Sandnes Ulf	2022	First Division	29	0	3	0	—		1 (Note: Appearance in the 2022 Norwegian First Division play-offs)	0	33	0
Sandnes Ulf	2023	First Division	17	1	2	0	—		—		19	1
Sandnes Ulf	Total		46	1	7	0	0	0	1	0	54	1
Sarpsborg 08	2023	Eliteserien	9	0	0	0	—		—		9	0
Sarpsborg 08	2024	Eliteserien	21	0	3	1	—		—		24	1
Sarpsborg 08	2025	Eliteserien	0	0	0	0	—		—		0	0
Sarpsborg 08	Total		30	0	3	1	0	0	0	0	33	1
Career totals			76	1	10	1	0	0	1	0	87	2
