= Mohanad Jeahze =

Iraqi footballer

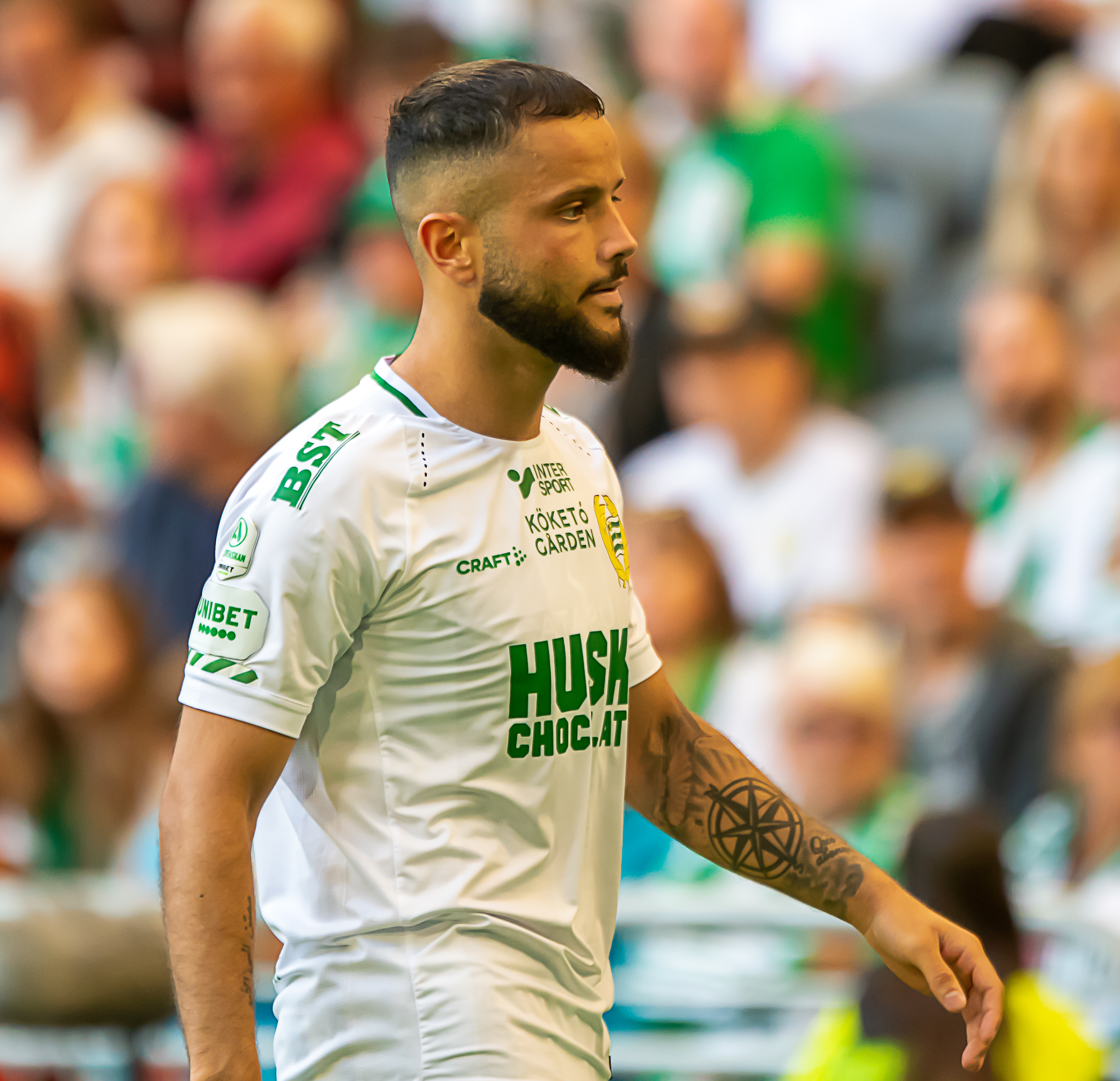
- Jeahze with Hammarby IF in 2022

Personal information
- Full name: Mohanad Abdulkadhim Qasim Al Jebur Jeahze
- Date of birth: 10 April 1997 (age 29)
- Place of birth: Linköping, Sweden
- Height: 1.79 m (5 ft 10 in)
- Position: Left-back

Team information
- Current team: Al-Quwa Al-Jawiya
- Number: 6

Youth career
- Karle IF
- IK Östria Lambohov
- AFK Linköping
- IFK Norrköping

Senior career*
Years	Team	Apps	(Gls)
2015–2017	IFK Norrköping	0	(0)
2015–2016	→ IF Sylvia (loan)	42	(1)
2017	→ Degerfors IF (loan)	11	(0)
2017	→ Syrianska (loan)	1	(0)
2018	IF Brommapojkarna	10	(0)
2019–2020	Mjällby AIF	39	(3)
2020–2022	Hammarby IF	61	(4)
2023–2024	D.C. United	7	(0)
2024	Lillestrøm	7	(0)
2025	Sarpsborg 08	19	(0)
2026	Duhok	0	(0)
2026–	Al-Quwa Al-Jawiya	9	(0)

International career^{‡}
2014	Sweden U17	2	(0)
2014–2016	Sweden U19	1	(0)
2021–	Iraq	4	(0)
- * Club domestic league appearances and goals as of 1 December 2025 ‡ National team caps and goals as of 1 February 2022

Mohanad Abdulkadhim Qasim Al Jebur Jeahze (Arabic: مهند جعاز, romanized: Muhanad Jihāz; pronounced [muˈhanad dʒiˈhaːz]; born 10 April 1997) is a professional footballer who plays as a left-back. Born in Sweden, he plays for the Al-Quwa Al-Jawiya and Iraq national football team.

== Early life ==
Growing up in Linköping, Jeahze started to play football as a youngster with local club Karle IF, in the same age group as fellow professional footballer Simon Olsson. He moved on to IK Östria Lambohov in his teens, that would reform as AFK Linköping, before joining the youth academy of Allsvenskan club IFK Norrköping.

== Club career ==
=== IFK Norrköping ===
On 20 June 2016, Jeahze signed a first-team contract with IFK Norrköping. He spent the 2016 and 2017 seasons on loan at affiliated club IF Sylvia in Division 1, Sweden's third tier, making 41 appearances in total.

In 2017, he was loaned out to Degerfors IF in Superettan, the domestic second tier, and played 11 games for the club during the first half of the season. In the summer transfer window, he was sent on loan to Syrianska FC in the same league, but suffered an injury in his debut for the club, that left him sidelined for the rest of the year.

=== IF Brommapojkarna ===
On 19 December 2017, Jeahze transferred to IF Brommapojkarna, that recently had been promoted to Allsvenskan, on a four-year deal. He failed to make an impact during the season, playing only ten games in total, as the side finished 14th in the table and was relegated after suffering a defeat to AFC Eskilstuna in the play-offs. He left the club by mutual consent at the end of the year.

=== Mjällby AIF ===
On 9 January 2019, Jeahze signed a two-year deal with Mjällby AIF in Superettan. Playing as a left wing-back, he had his breakthrough the same season, playing 27 games and scoring three goals, as the club won the second division.

In 2020, Jeahze missed the start of the Allsvenskan season due to an injury, before making his comeback to the pitch and starting in 12 straight games.

=== Hammarby IF ===
On 25 August 2020, Jeahze transferred to Hammarby IF for an undisclosed fee, signing a three-and-a-half-year contract.

On 30 May 2021, Jeahze won the 2020–21 Svenska Cupen, the main domestic cup, with Hammarby through a 5–4 win on penalties (0–0 after full-time) against BK Häcken in the final. He featured in all six games as the side reached the play-off round of the 2021–22 UEFA Europa Conference League, after eliminating Maribor (4–1 on aggregate) and FK Čukarički (6–4 on aggregate, in which Jeahze scored), where the club was knocked out by Basel (4–4 on aggregate) after a penalty shoot-out.

Jeahze featured in the final of the 2021–22 Svenska Cupen, in which Hammarby lost by 4–5 on penalties to Malmö FF after the game ended in a 0–0 draw. In May 2022, Jeahze was linked with a transfer to Scottish Premiership club Celtic, but the deal eventually fell through. On 27 July 2022, Hammarby announced that Jeahze would suspend training with the club indefinitely, due to ongoing transfer talks. The club's decision came after Jeahze caused controversy for reportedly refusing to take part in an Allsvenskan fixture against Varbergs BoIS, following a rejected bid from Turkish Süper Lig club Beşiktaş. About a week later, on 3 August, Jeahze returned to training with Hammarby after issuing an apology to the club. He ended the 2022 season making 26 league appearances, scoring three goals, as the side finished 3rd in the Allsvenskan table.

=== D.C. United ===
On 7 December 2022, Major League Soccer club D.C. United announced they had signed Jeahze on a three-year deal, with an option for a further year. Jeahze was signed with targeted allocation money for an undisclosed fee, although reports suggested that it was set at around 7–10 million Swedish kronor. On 24 April 2023, D.C. United put out a statement saying that Jeahze would be on approved leave in Sweden, as he was suspended following allegations of two counts of assaults, both occurring in Stockholm. The MLS lifted the suspension on 24 May 2023 following the conclusion of the investigation, and no charges were made. Jeahze's contract was terminated on 3 June 2024.

== International career ==
Although born in Sweden and having played in Sweden's youth selection, Jeahze's family is from Samawah, Iraq and he pledged his allegiance to Iraq in 2020. A year later, in 2021, it was however reported that Jeahze was still undecided on which country to represent internationally, if called up.

On 11 November 2021, Jeahze formally made his debut for Iraq in a 1–1 2022 FIFA World Cup qualification tie with Syria.

== Career statistics ==
=== Club ===
As of 18 July 2024

Appearances and goals by club, season and competition
Club	Season	League			National cup (Note: Includes Svenska Cupen, Norwegian Cup)		Continental		Total	
Club	Season	Division	Apps	Goals	Apps	Goals	Apps	Goals	Apps	Goals
IFK Norrköping	2015	Allsvenskan	0	0	0	0	—		0	0
IF Sylvia (loan)	2015	Ettan	21	0	2	0	—		23	0
IF Sylvia (loan)	2016	Ettan	21	1	0	0	—		21	1
IF Sylvia (loan)	Total		42	1	2	0	—		44	1
Degerfors IF (loan)	2017	Superettan	11	0	1	0	—		12	0
Syrianska (loan)	2017	Superettan	1	0	0	0	—		1	0
IF Brommapojkarna	2018	Allsvenskan	10	0	2	0	—		12	0
Mjällby AIF	2019	Superettan	27	3	1	1	—		28	4
Mjällby AIF	2020	Allsvenskan	12	0	3	0	—		15	0
Mjällby AIF	Total		39	3	4	1	—		43	4
Hammarby IF	2020	Allsvenskan	8	0	0	0	2 (Note: Appearances in UEFA Europa League)	0	10	0
Hammarby IF	2021	Allsvenskan	27	1	6	0	6 (Note: Appearances in UEFA Europa Conference League)	1	39	2
Hammarby IF	2022	Allsvenskan	26	3	7	0	—		33	3
Hammarby IF	Total		61	4	13	0	8	1	82	5
D.C. United	2023	MLS	6	0	0	0	—		6	0
D.C. United	2024	MLS	1	0	0	0	—		1	0
D.C. United	Total		7	0	0	0	—		7	0
Lillestrøm	2024	Eliteserien	7	0	1	0	—		8	0
Sarpsborg 08	2025	Eliteserien	9	0	4	0	—		13	0
Career total			187	8	27	1	8	1	222	10

== Honours ==
Mjällby AIF

- Superettan: 2019

Hammarby IF

- Svenska Cupen: 2020–21

== See also ==
- List of Iraq international footballers
