= Martin Foyston =

English association football manager

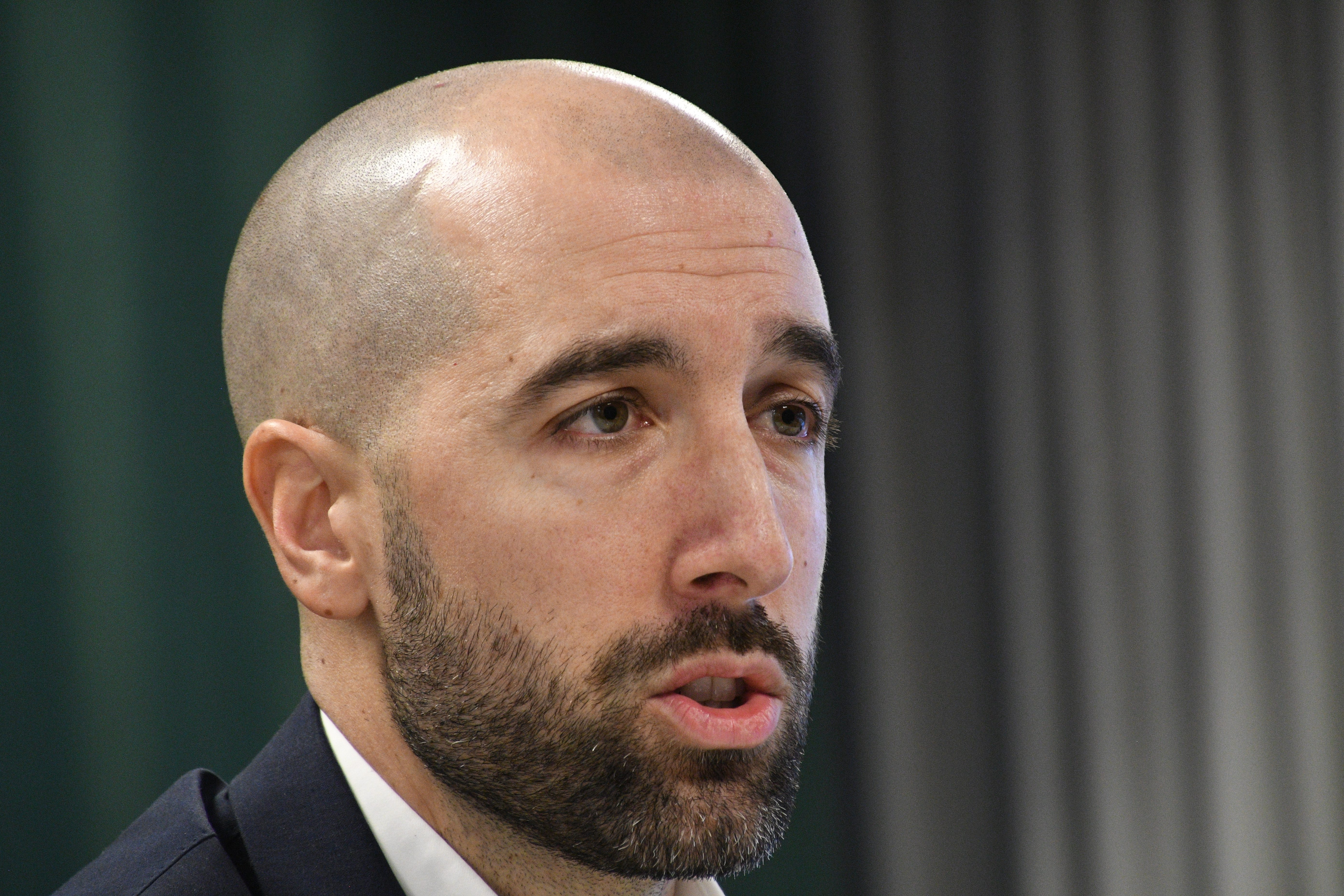
- Foyston being presented at Östers IF

Personal information
- Date of birth: 22 September 1982 (age 44)
- Place of birth: Hull, England

Managerial career
- Years: Team
- 2024–2025: Östers IF
- 2025: Sarpsborg 08

Martin Foyston (born 22 September 1982) is an English football manager.

Foyston began his career as a video analyst at Fulham in 2005. Having obtained UEFA coaching licences, he moved to Sweden in 2013, and worked as assistant manager at several clubs and the Norway national team. His first senior head coach job was at Östers IF, winning promotion from Superettan in his first season in 2024, but being sacked during the Allsvenskan season in 2025. He finished the year at Sarpsborg 08, where he lost the Norwegian Football Cup final.

== Career ==
=== Fulham ===
Born in Kingston upon Hull, Foyston was a youth player at hometown club Hull City before studying film and media production at college and university. After graduating in 2005, he joined Premier League club Fulham as a match analyst.

Foyston credited Roy Hodgson, who arrived as Fulham manager in late 2007, as being the best coach in England and inspiring him to become a manager. Having earned his UEFA B licence and started the A licence, he made the decision in 2013 to emigrate to Sweden, his wife's country. He deliberately went without having a job lined up, and Fulham player Damien Duff gave him a copy of the novel The Alchemist, which resonated with his situation.

=== Assistant in Scandinavia ===
Foyston immediately turned down an analyst job at Allsvenskan champions IF Elfsborg, believing the job would be too easy. He got an assistant manager job at Djurgårdens IF Fotboll using the influence of former Fulham player Brede Hangeland, who had played under new head coach Per-Mathias Høgmo for Norway under-21. When Høgmo was hired by Norway's senior team, Foyston followed him, initially in tandem with his job at Djurgården. He quit his post with the Swedish club due to a lack of agreement with new manager Pelle Olsson.

Norway failed to qualify for UEFA Euro 2016 and made a poor start to 2018 FIFA World Cup qualification, leading to Høgmo's resignation. Foyston had one more year on his contract with the Norwegian Football Federation, but he moved to Strømsgodset Toppfotball in the country's Eliteserien, under manager Tor Ole Skullerud.

In December 2018, Foyston was given his first head coach role, returning to Sweden to lead Hammarby Fotboll's under-19 team. A year later, he returned to assistant duties at farm team IK Frej. He began 2021 by being appointed to an assistant job with Finland under-21, and in June he moved to BK Häcken as second-in-command to Høgmo.

=== Östers IF ===
At the end of 2023, Foyston was hired in his first head coach role at a senior club, Superettan club Östers IF. On 9 November 2024, in the last fixture of the season, his side won 2–1 away to champions Degerfors IF to be promoted in second place, ending 11 years outside the Allsvenskan.

On 30 March 2025, Foyston's first top-flight game was a 4–3 loss away to IFK Norrköping. He was sacked on 4 September with the team in 14th place, in the relegation play-off position; his last game was a 4–0 loss to Hammarby.

=== Sarpsborg 08 ===
On 25 September 2025, Foyston was hired as the new head coach of Eliteserien side Sarpsborg 08, until the end of the season. He was the third manager of the year as the team came 9th, short of a target to qualify for Europe. On 6 December, the club played the Norwegian Football Cup final, which they had qualified to before his appointment. They lost 3–1 to Lillestrøm SK in his last match.

== Managerial statistics ==
As of match played 6 December 2025

Managerial record by team and tenure
Team	From	To	Record					Ref.
Team	From	To	P	W	D	L	Win %	Ref.
Östers IF	27 December 2023	4 September 2025	59	24	15	20	40.68	
Sarpsborg 08	25 September 2025	6 December 2025	9	4	1	4	44.44	
Total			68	28	16	24	41.18	—
