= Andreas Nibe =

Danish footballer (born 2003)

Personal information
- Full name: Andreas Nibe Hansen
- Date of birth: 31 May 2003 (age 23)
- Place of birth: Kerteminde, Denmark
- Height: 1.82 m (6 ft 0 in)
- Positions: Winger; attacking midfielder

Team information
- Current team: Sarpsborg 08
- Number: 33

Youth career
- –2016: Kerteminde BK
- 2016–2023: Midtjylland

Senior career*
Years	Team	Apps	(Gls)
2022–2023	Midtjylland	0	(0)
2023	→ Næstved (loan)	16	(0)
2023–2025	Mafra	64	(6)
2025–	Sarpsborg 08	21	(1)

International career
2022	Denmark U19	1	(1)
2024	Denmark U20	3	(0)
- * Club domestic league appearances and goals as of 23 July 2026

Andreas Nibe Hansen (born 31 May 2003) is a Danish professional footballer who plays as a winger or an attacking midfielder for Eliteserien side Sarpsborg 08.

== Club career ==
=== FC Midtjylland ===
Nibe joined FC Midtjylland as a 13-year-old from Kerteminde Boldklub in 2016. Here he became part of Midtjylland's youth academy. In September 2022, Nibe signed a long-term contract extension with Midtjylland, until June 2027.

A little over a month later, on 19 October 2022, Nibe made his official debut for Midtjylland when he played one half against FA 2000 in the Danish Cup. He didn't get any more first-team appearances for the rest of 2022, but was on the bench five times without being used. In search of more playing time and experience, Nibe was loaned out to Danish 1st Division club Næstved Boldklub in January 2023 until the end of the season. During his loan Nibe played 16 matches for the club.

=== CD Mafra ===
On 18 July 2023, Nibe, along with two other teammates, moved to Liga Portugal 2 club C.D. Mafra. Nibe made his debut for the club in a league match on 13 August 2023, against F.C. Paços de Ferreira.

=== Sarpsborg 08 ===
On August 16, 2025, it was confirmed that Nibe had transferred to the Eliteserien club Sarpsborg 08 on a contract until the end of 2028.
