= Michael Opoku =

Danish footballer (born 2005)

Personal information
- Full name: Michael Opoku
- Date of birth: 20 July 2005 (age 21)
- Place of birth: Brøndby Strand, Denmark
- Height: 1.81 m (5 ft 11 in)
- Position: Left winger

Team information
- Current team: Sarpsborg 08
- Number: 15

Youth career
- Brøndby
- 2020–2024: Lyngby

Senior career*
| Years | Team | Apps | (Gls) |
| 2024–2025 | Lyngby | 26 | (4) |
| 2025– | Sarpsborg 08 | 14 | (1) |

International career^{‡}
| 2024 | Denmark U-19 | 5 | (0) |
| 2024– | Denmark U-20 | 6 | (0) |
- * Club domestic league appearances and goals as of 23 July 2026 ‡ National team caps and goals as of 20:57, 25 January 2026 (UTC)

Michael Opoku (born 20 July 2005) is a Danish footballer who plays as a left winger for Eliteserien club Sarpsborg 08.

== Career ==
=== Club career ===
Born in Brøndby Strand, Opoku started his football career in Brøndby IF. In the summer of 2020, after several years in Brøndby, he moved to Lyngby Boldklub.

In the winter break 2024, 18-year-old Opoku trained fully with Lyngby's first team and also attended a training camp in Turkey. This was rewarded in January 2024 when he signed his first professional contract until June 2028, where he would be promoted to the first team squad from the summer of 2024. On February 18, 2024, Opoku made his debut for Lyngby in the Danish Superliga in a match against FC Nordsjælland, replacing Marcel Rømer in the 81st minute.

In July 2024, Opoku was part of the Denmark U-19 national team that participated in the 2024 UEFA European Under-19 Championship.

== Personal life ==
Born in Denmark, Opoku is of Ghanaian descent.
