= Peter Reinhardsen =

Norwegian footballer (born 1999)

Personal information
- Date of birth: 21 April 1999 (age 27)
- Place of birth: Kristiansand, Norway
- Height: 1.86 m (6 ft 1 in)
- Positions: Centre-back; right-back

Team information
- Current team: Sarpsborg 08
- Number: 20

Youth career
- Donn
- 2010–2017: Start

Senior career*
Years	Team	Apps	(Gls)
2015–2018	Start 2	49	(4)
2018–2019	Jerv	29	(1)
2020	Arendal	16	(1)
2021–2022	Start	41	(8)
2023–	Sarpsborg 08	66	(4)
- * Club domestic league appearances and goals as of 17 June 2026

Peter Reinhardsen (born 21 April 1999) is a Norwegian footballer who plays as a defender for Sarpsborg 08.

== Career ==
Born in Kristiansand, he joined the academy of IK Start from FK Donn at the age of 11. He played for the senior B team until the summer of 2018, when he changed to FK Jerv. Reinhardsen played two years in the 1. divisjon for Jerv, then the 2020 2. divisjon season for Arendal. He was welcomed back to Start in 2021.

Underway in the 2022 season, Reinhardsen found himself in an open conflict with Start. As Reinhardsen visited Sarpsborg 08 FF as a possible future employer, he was left out of Start's team. Reinhardsen proceeded to sign for Sarpsborg 08 in October 2022. Unusually, he vented his frustration with Start in a letter to the editor of Fædrelandsvennen.

Reinhardsen made his Eliteserien debut in the 2023 season opener.
