= Victor Halvorsen =

Norwegian footballer (born 2005)

Personal information
- Full name: Victor Emanuel Halvorsen
- Date of birth: 3 July 2004 (age 22)
- Place of birth: Norway
- Position: Midfielder

Team information
- Current team: Sarpsborg 08
- Number: 22

Youth career
- –2021: Kjelsås

Senior career*
Years	Team	Apps	(Gls)
2021–2023	Kjelsås	44	(3)
2023–	Sarpsborg 08	60	(7)
2023	→ Kjelsås (loan)	9	(1)

International career^{‡}
2025–	Norway U21	2	(0)
- * Club domestic league appearances and goals as of 23 July 2026 ‡ National team caps and goals as of 29 June 2025

Victor Emanuel Halvorsen (born 3 July 2004) is a Norwegian footballer who plays as a midfielder for Sarpsborg 08.

He is a son of Dag Halvorsen, a player of Kjelsås for many years. Victor Emanuel Halvorsen played youth football for Kjelsås before making his senior debut in September 2021. In August 2023 he was signed by Sarpsborg 08, only to be loaned back to Kjelsås for the rest of the 2023 season. Kjelsås had a run in the 2023 cup that only ended in the semi-final. Halvorsen was also named Young Player of the Year in the 2023 2. divisjon.

In 2024, he started about half of the games in Eliteserien. Having never represented a youth national team, Halvorsen was called up to Norway U21 in November 2024. He made his debut in March 2025.
