= Frederik Carstensen =

Danish footballer (born 2002)

Personal information
- Full name: FFrederik Bjerregaard Carstensen
- Date of birth: 9 April 2002 (age 24)
- Place of birth: Virklund, Denmark
- Height: 1.80 m (5 ft 11 in)
- Position: Winger

Team information
- Current team: Sarpsborg 08
- Number: 16

Youth career
- Virklund BK
- Silkeborg

Senior career*
Years	Team	Apps	(Gls)
2021–2024	Silkeborg	8	(1)
2022–2023	→ Fredericia (loan)	20	(5)
2023–2024	→ Fredericia (loan)	20	(3)
2024–	Sarpsborg 08	18	(6)

International career
2018	Denmark U-16	7	(1)
2018–2019	Denmark U-17	16	(3)
2019–2020	Denmark U-18	4	(1)
- * Club domestic league appearances and goals as of 1 December 2025

Frederik Bjerregaard Carstensen (born 9 April 2002) is a Danish professional footballer who plays as a winger for Norwegian Eliteserien club Sarpsborg 08 FF.

== Career ==
=== Silkeborg IF ===
Carstensen joined Silkeborg IF at the age of 12 from Virklund Boldklub. In November 2019, Carstensen signed a three-year contract extension with Silkeborg. In July 2020, he signed a new contract again, this time until June 2024.

Carstensen worked his way up through Silkeborg's youth sector and got his official debut for the club on 14 February 2021 against Hvidovre IF in the Danish 1st Division. He made one more appearance in the 1st Division, before he in April 2021 got a fatigue fracture in his foot, which kept him out until August 2021.

Silkeborg was promoted to the 2021-22 Danish Superliga. Carstensen got his debut in the highest football league in Denmark on 31 October 2021 against SønderjyskE. On 18 February 2022, Carstensen signed a new long-term deal with Silkeborg, until June 2026. On 30 August 2022, Carstensen was loaned out to Danish 1st Division side FC Fredericia until the end of the 2022–23 season. At the end of August 2023, Carstensen returned to FC Fredericia. In the summer of 2024, Carstensen returned to Silkeborg.

=== Sarpsborg 08 ===
On July 23, 2024, the Norwegian Eliteserien club Sarpsborg 08 FF confirmed that they had bought Carstensen from Silkeborg and signed him to a contract until the end of 2028. He made his debut for Sarpsbog on 4 August 2024 against Sandefjord. In his first six months at the club, Carstensen made nine appearances, scoring two goals and one assist.

== Personal life ==
Frederik Carstensen's older brother, Rasmus Carstensen, is also a professional footballer.
