= Sander Christiansen =

Norwegian footballer (born 2001)

Personal information
- Full name: Sander Johan Christiansen
- Date of birth: 29 April 2001 (age 25)
- Place of birth: Norway
- Height: 1.85 m (6 ft 1 in)
- Positions: Midfielder; left back

Team information
- Current team: Sarpsborg 08
- Number: 8

Youth career
- Loddefjord
- –2018: Brann
- 2018–2020: Borussia Mönchengladbach

Senior career*
| Years | Team | Apps | (Gls) |
| 2020–2022 | Borussia Mönchengladbach II | 27 | (0) |
| 2022– | Sarpsborg 08 | 70 | (4) |

International career^{‡}
| 2016 | Norway U15 | 5 | (0) |
| 2017 | Norway U16 | 7 | (1) |
| 2018 | Norway U17 | 12 | (0) |
| 2019 | Norway U18 | 5 | (0) |
- * Club domestic league appearances and goals as of 23 July 2026 ‡ National team caps and goals as of 28 March 2025

Sander Christiansen (born 29 April 2001) is a Norwegian footballer who plays as a left back for Sarpsborg 08.

Hailing from Godvik in Bergen's borough of Laksevåg, he started his youth career in Loddefjord IL before joining SK Brann's academy. In 2018, he was discovered by several foreign clubs after playing for Norway U16 and U17. He did not have a professional contract with Brann, and could thus freely join an academy abroad. He chose Borussia Mönchengladbach, moving there after the 2018 UEFA European Under-17 Championship. In 2020 he progressed from their youth team to Borussia Mönchengladbach II in the Regionalliga.

In the summer of 2022, he moved home from Germany. He first trained with his former club SK Brann as well as Åsane, but signed for Sarpsborg 08 in Eastern Norway. His start in Sarpsborg 08 was very slow, with Christiansen not playing a single game in 2022, but during 2023 he was repurposed from a midfielder to left back. He renewed his contract at the end of the year. He scored his first Eliteserien goals against Lillestrøm in September 2023.
