= Sarpsborg 08 FF =

Norwegian football club

Sarpsborg 08
- Full name: Sarpsborg 08 Fotballforening
- Founded: 15 January 2008; 18 years ago
- Ground: Sarpsborg Stadion, Sarpsborg, Norway
- Capacity: 8,022
- Chairman: Hans Petter Arnesen
- Head coach: Even Sel
- League: Eliteserien
- 2025: Eliteserien, 9th of 16
- Website: www.sarpsborg08.no
Home colours	Away colours

Sarpsborg 08 Fotballforening, commonly known as Sarpsborg 08 or simply Sarpsborg ([ˈsɑ̀ʂbɔr]), is a Norwegian professional football club based in Sarpsborg, playing in Eliteserien. Sarpsborg 08 and its predecessors played in 1. divisjon from 2005 to 2010. In 2010, the club was promoted to the Tippeligaen, the top league in Norway, but finished last and was relegated back to 1. divisjon in 2011. In 2012, they were promoted again and 6 years after, they qualified for their first Europa League group stage. They play their home games at Sarpsborg Stadion.

== History ==
=== Pre-existence ===
Football in Sarpsborg has traditionally been dominated by Sarpsborg FK (SFK), which won the Norwegian Cup six times and played 20 seasons in the top division, and to a lesser extent IL Sparta, which won the Norwegian Cup in 1952 and played nine seasons in the top division. However, after SFK's relegation from the 1974, no teams from Sarpsborg played in the top division for the next two decades. In 1999, 16 teams in the Sarpsborg area joined forces to create a team that could compete in the top divisions of Norwegian football, called Sarpsborg Fotball, which overtook SFK's spot in the league-system. In its first season, the team was relegated from the 2. divisjon, and several clubs, including both SFK and Sparta, withdrew from the collaboration.

The remaining clubs in the "Sarpsborg Fotball" project formed a new club called Borg Fotball, which won promotion to the 2. divisjon in 2002, but was relegated again in 2003. Meanwhile, Sparta was promoted to the Second Division the same season, and re-entered the collaboration club which now was renamed FK Sparta Sarpsborg. The club earned promotion to 1. divisjon (the second tier of Norwegian football) in 2005.

=== Foundation ===
At the end of the 2007 season, the last major club in the district, Sarpsborg FK, joined the collaboration of teams and ended a rather long and hefty rivalry between the two clubs. At the same time, in an effort to unite the different factions within the collaboration, the jersey was changed and the club renamed itself Sarpsborg Sparta FK. This name remained a source of contention throughout the 2008 season, however, and a new name, Sarpsborg 08 FF, was adopted in 2009.

The 2009 season started badly for Sarpsborg, and it appeared they would be fighting against relegation to the 2. divisjon. The situation worsened when the Football Association of Norway determined that Sarpsborg 08 had submitted an unrealistic budget when they obtained their license to play in the 1. divisjon, and were penalized three points in June, leaving Sarpsborg in a relegation spot. However, after Roar Johansen became coach, the second part of the season went well for the team, which not only climbed out of the relegation spots, but finished fifth, allowing them to participate in the qualification matches for the 2010 Tippeligaen. In the semi-final match of the qualification, Sarpsborg defeated local rivals Fredrikstad FK 2–0 (who were therefore relegated from the top division). In the home match of the qualification final, Sarpsborg defeated Kongsvinger 3–2, but lost the second leg 3–1 and remained in the 1. divisjon.

=== Promotions and development ===
The 2010 season ended with a 4–0 home-win against Alta. This meant that the team ended in second place, after league-winner Sogndal, and won the right to play in the 2011 edition of the Tippeligaen.

The 2011 season started with a surprising 3–0 win against Molde in Ole Gunnar Solskjær first match as manager of Molde. But after a good start, Sarpsborg was relegated back to 1. divisjon on 23 October 2011, when they lost 3–0 away at Brann with three rounds left to play. The club finished last with only 21 points.

In the 2012 season, Sarpsborg finished the 1. divisjon in second place and was promoted to Tippeligaen. On 3 January 2013, former Sheffield United striker Brian Deane was appointed as head coach. In 2015, Geir Bakke took over as head coach and led the club to their first Norwegian Cup final. They lost the 2015 Norwegian Football Cup final 0−2 against Rosenborg. In 2017 they repeated the feat and reached the final again, but lost 2–3 against Lillestrøm. Sarpsborg finished in third place in the 2017 Eliteserien, their first medal-winning position in club history.

On 30 August 2018 Sarpsborg 08 qualified for the group stage of the 2018–19 UEFA Europa League for the first time in history.

=== African springboard ===
Sarpsborg 08 has gained a reputation as one of the best springboards for African players in need of a European acclimatization club. Senegalese Makthar Thioune played three years for Sparta Sarpsborg and Sarpsborg Sparta (Sarpsborg 08's predecessors) in the second tier, and when Molde purchased him in 2009 he was immediately "Player of the Year" in the top league, with the third highest rating in a 25-year period. He later played in Germany. Another big Sarpsborg 08 transfer in 2014 happened when Guangshou R&F manager Sven Göran Eriksson purchased Aaron Samuel from Sarpsborg 08 for €1.4m. Samuel blossomed in Sarpsborg with 13 goals in a year, after only 2 goals in big city club Vålerenga. He also scored both his goals for Nigeria in 2014. In 2017 Sarpsborg 08 signed Krepin Diatta from Senegal. He hardly played in his first half year in the club, but then blossomed with 5 goals and 8 assists in 3 months. Diatta was then sold to Brügge for €2.65m and later to Monaco for €16.7m. In 2019 Sarpsborg 08 signed Malian Ismaila Coulibaly and while acclimatized he only started 5 matches in the first 35 league matches while in the club. Then he was given the chance at a time the club was rock bottom with five losses in five matches. The club then took 17 points in the next 6 weeks and Coulibaly dominated with 4 goals, leading to Sheffield United purchasing him for €2m. Being only the 16th largest municipality in Norway, the processing of African teenage talents has been a major success factor leading to Sarpsborg 08 fighting above the size of the city.

== Recent history ==
Season	League	Pos.	Pl.	W	D	L	GS	GA	P	Cup	Top scorer	Player of the year	Notes
Pre-existence
2000	2. divisjon	↓ 9	22	6	7	9	33	36	25	First round	Jon Bjerkholt		As Sarpsborg Fotball, relegated to the 3. divisjon
2001	3. divisjon	5	22	12	2	8	47	33	38	First round	Pål Østby		As Navestad in tables, commercial name was FF Sarpsborg
2002	3. divisjon	↑ 1	22	19	2	1	76	14	59	First round	Jørn Holmen		Name changed to Borg Fotball, promoted to 2. divisjon
2002	3. divisjon	2	22	16	5	1	67	27	53	First round			As FK Sparta Sarpsborg, status as secondary club
2003	2. divisjon	↓ 11	22	5	9	12	35	56	24	Second round	Gjermund B. Hansen		As Borg Fotball, relegated to the 3. divisjon, name changed to FK Sparta Sarpsborg 2
2003	3. divisjon	↑ 1	22	17	4	1	88	24	55	Second round	Lasse Alexandersen		As FK Sparta Sarpsborg, promoted to the 2. divisjon
2004	2. divisjon	2	26	16	4	6	63	38	52	Second round	Lasse Alexandersen		As FK Sparta Sarpsborg, now defined as primary club
2005	2. divisjon	↑ 1	26	21	1	4	90	28	64	Second round	Ronald Turner		Promoted to the 1. divisjon
2006	1. divisjon	10	30	11	6	13	44	56	37	First round	Fredrik Dahm	Makhtar Thioune	
2007	1. divisjon	13	30	8	8	14	50	52	32	Second round	Bjørnar Johannessen	Bjørnar Johannessen	Avoided relegation because Raufoss had its license revoked
Club history
2008	1. divisjon	10	30	10	7	13	45	43	37	Third round	Martin Wiig	Are Tronseth	Name changed to Sarpsborg Sparta FK
2009	1. divisjon	5	30	15	5	10	47	38	47	Second round	Martin Wiig	Are Tronseth	Name changed to Sarpsborg 08 FF
2010	1. divisjon	↑ 2	28	16	6	6	54	36	54	Third round	Martin Wiig & Morten Giæver	Ole Heieren Hansen	Promoted to the Tippeligaen
2011	Tippeligaen	↓ 16	30	5	6	19	31	65	21	Fourth round	Martin Wiig	Øyvind Hoås	Relegated to the 1. divisjon
2012	1. divisjon	↑ 2	30	19	6	5	73	43	63	Third round	Martin Wiig	Tom Erik Breive	Promoted to the Tippeligaen
2013	Tippeligaen	14	30	8	7	15	40	58	31	Second round	Martin Wiig & Moi Elyounoussi	Duwayne Kerr	
2014	Tippeligaen	8	30	10	10	10	41	48	40	Semifinal	Bojan Zajic	Joachim Thomassen	
2015	Tippeligaen	11	30	8	10	12	37	49	34	Runners-up	Bojan Zajic	Anders Trondsen	
2016	Tippeligaen	6	30	12	9	9	35	37	45	Quarterfinal	Pål A. Kirkevold	Sigurd Rosted	
2017	Eliteserien	3	30	13	12	5	50	36	51	Runners-up	Patrick Mortensen	Sigurd Rosted	
2018	Eliteserien	8	30	11	8	11	46	39	41	Third round	Patrick Mortensen	Joachim Thomassen	Europa League group stage
2019	Eliteserien	12	30	5	15	10	30	40	30	Third round	Kristoffer Zachariassen	Kristoffer Zachariassen	
2020	Eliteserien	12	30	8	8	14	33	43	32	Cancelled	Mustafa Abdellaoue	Anton Saletros	
2021	Eliteserien	8	30	11	6	13	39	44	39	Quarterfinal	Ibrahima Koné	Bjørn Inge Utvik	
2022	Eliteserien	8	30	12	5	13	57	54	41	Second round	Tobias Heintz	Anton Saletros	
2023	Eliteserien	8	30	12	5	13	55	52	41	Quarter final	Mikkel Maigaard		
2024	Eliteserien	9	30	10	7	13	43	55	37	Fourth round	Henrik Meister		
2025	Eliteserien	9	30	11	8	11	48	50	41	Runners-up	Daniel Karlsbakk		
2026 (in progress)	Eliteserien	9	25	8	7	10	32	39	31	Fourth round	Daniel Karlsbakk		

== European record ==
Season	Competition	Round	Club	Home	Away	Agg.
2018–19	UEFA Europa League	1QR	(Iceland) ÍBV	2−0	4−0	6−0
2018–19	UEFA Europa League	2QR	(Switzerland) St. Gallen	1−0	1–2	2−2 (a)
2018–19	UEFA Europa League	3QR	(Croatia) Rijeka	1−1	1−0	2−1
2018–19	UEFA Europa League	PO	(Israel) Maccabi Tel Aviv	3−1	1–2	4−3
2018–19	UEFA Europa League	Group I	(Turkey) Beşiktaş	2–3	1–3	4th
2018–19	UEFA Europa League	Group I	(Belgium) Genk	3−1	0–4	4th
2018–19	UEFA Europa League	Group I	(Sweden) Malmö	1–1	1–1	4th

Notes

- 1QR: First qualifying round
- 2QR: Second qualifying round
- 3QR: Third qualifying round
- PO: Play-off round

== Players ==
=== Current squad ===
As of 14 August 2026

Note: Flags indicate national team as defined under FIFA eligibility rules; some limited exceptions apply. Players may hold more than one non-FIFA nationality.

No.	Pos.	Nation	Player
1	GK	DEN	Jacob Pryts (on loan from Start)
2	DF	NOR	Marius Lode
4	DF	NOR	Bjørn Inge Utvik
5	DF	NOR	Lucas Høyland
6	MF	IRQ	Aimar Sher
7	FW	MAR	Camil Mmaee
8	MF	NOR	Sander Christiansen
10	FW	NOR	Sondre Sørli (Captain)
11	FW	NOR	Daniel Karlsbakk
12	DF	BDI	Claus Niyukuri
14	MF	NOR	Jo Inge Berget

No.	Pos.	Nation	Player
15	FW	DEN	Michael Opoku
16	FW	DEN	Frederik Carstensen
17	FW	SWE	Noa Williams
18	MF	SEN	Bop Gueye
20	DF	NOR	Peter Reinhardsen
21	DF	NOR	Anders Hiim
22	MF	NOR	Victor Halvorsen
24	DF	NOR	Sigurd Rosted
32	DF	NOR	Eirik Wichne
33	MF	DEN	Andreas Nibe
77	MF	NOR	Olaus Skarsem
81	MF	NOR	Mathias Svenningsen-Grønn
87	GK	NOR	Leander Øy

=== Out on loan ===
Note: Flags indicate national team as defined under FIFA eligibility rules; some limited exceptions apply. Players may hold more than one non-FIFA nationality.

No.	Pos.	Nation	Player
3	DF	NOR	Nikolai Skuseth (at Degerfors until 31 December 2026)
25	MF	NOR	Jesper Gregersen (at Egersund until 31 December 2026)
27	MF	NOR	Harald Nilsen Tangen (at Vendsyssel until 31 December 2026)

No.	Pos.	Nation	Player
29	FW	NOR	Martin Håheim-Elveseter (at Hødd until 31 December 2026)
80	MF	NOR	Szymon Roguski (at Kvik Halden until 30 November 2026)
—	DF	NOR	Adam Kaszuba (at Kvik Halden until 30 November 2026)

== Notable players ==
Below are notable players who have represented Sarpsborg 08. To appear in the section below, a player must have either at least two international matches or Champions League matches (group stage or later), 150 official club matches or 30 club goals, including appearances and goals for preceding teams mentioned in pre-existence phase. Players are sorted by birth date.

- (Hungary) Peter Kovacs
- (Norway) Tom Erik Breive
- (Norway) Berat Jusufi
- (Norway) Kjetil Berge
- (Norway) Martin Wiig
- (Norway) Øyvind Hoås
- (France) Jeremy Berthod
- (Senegal) Makhtar Thioune
- (Jamaica) Duwayne Kerr
- (Norway) Ole Heieren Hansen
- (Northern Ireland) Kyle Lafferty
- (Norway) Ole Jørgen Halvorsen
- (Sweden) Erton Fejzullahu
- (Norway) Joachim Thomassen
- (Norway) Joackim Jørgensen
- (Sweden) Guillermo Molins
- (Benin) Jordan Adeoti
- (Denmark) Patrick Mortensen
- (Iceland) Þórarinn Valdimarsson
- (Iceland) Kristinn Jónsson
- (Norway) Jo Inge Berget
- (North Macedonia) David Mitov Nilsson
- (Trinidad and Tobago) Sheldon Bateau
- (Estonia) Henrik Ojamaa
- (Guinea) Mikael Dyrestam
- (Gabon) Junior
- (Estonia) Joonas Tamm
- (Iceland) Guðmundur Þórarinsson
- (Norway) Magnar Ødegaard
- (Norway) Kristoffer Zachariassen
- (Costa Rica) Wilmer Azofeifa
- (Nigeria) Aaron Samuel
- (Norway) Sigurd Rosted
- (Lebanon) Felix Michel
- (Norway) Mohamed Elyounoussi
- (Norway) Anders Trondsen
- (Albania) Kamer Qaka
- (Iceland) Orri Ómarsson
- (Sweden) Anton Saletros
- (Sweden) Gustav Engvall
- (The Gambia) Sulayman Bojang
- (Norway) Tobias Heintz
- (Senegal) Krepin Diatta
- (Mali) Ibrahima Kone
- (Norway) Jørgen Strand Larsen

== Managers ==
Sarpsborg 08 FF managers from 2008 to present
- (Sweden) Conny Karlsson (Jan 1, 2008 – Sept 23, 2009)
- (Norway) Roar Johansen (Sept 24, 2009 – Dec 31, 2012)
- (England) Brian Deane (Jan 1, 2013 – Nov 9, 2014)
- (Norway) Geir Bakke (Jan 1, 2015 – Dec 31, 2019)
- (Sweden) Mikael Stahre (Jan 13, 2020– June 2, 2021)
- (Norway) Lars Bohinen (June 6, 2021 – Dec 31, 2021)
- (Sweden) Stefan Billborn (Jan 7, 2022 – June 23, 2024)
- (Norway) Christian Michelsen (June 25, 2024 – August 20, 2025)
- (England) Martin Foyston (September 25, 2025 – December 6, 2025)
- (Norway) Even Sel (December 22, 2025 – )
