= 2021 Lillestrøm SK season =

Lillestrøm
2021 season
- Chairman: Morten Kokkim
- Head coach: Geir Bakke
- Stadium: Åråsen Stadion
- Eliteserien: 4th
- Norwegian Cup: Fourth round
- Top goalscorer: League: Thomas Lehne Olsen (26); All: Thomas Lehne Olsen (28)
Home colours	Away colours

The 2021 season was Lillestrøm SK's 104th season in existence and the club's first season return in the top flight of Norwegian football. In addition to the domestic league, Lillestrøm SK participated in this season's edition of the Norwegian Football Cup.

== Players ==
=== First team squad ===
As of 27 October 2021

Note: Flags indicate national team as defined under FIFA eligibility rules; some limited exceptions apply. Players may hold more than one non-FIFA nationality.

No.	Pos.	Nation	Player
1	GK	NOR	Knut-André Skjærstein
3	DF	NOR	Simen Kind Mikalsen
4	DF	NOR	Espen Garnås
5	DF	NOR	Vetle Dragsnes
6	MF	FIN	Kaan Kairinen
7	FW	NOR	Pål André Helland
8	MF	NGR	Ifeanyi Mathew
10	FW	NOR	Thomas Lehne Olsen (Captain)
11	FW	NOR	Tobias Svendsen
12	GK	NOR	Mads Hedenstad Christiansen
14	MF	NOR	Fredrik Krogstad
15	DF	NOR	Josef Baccay
17	FW	NOR	Jonatan Braut Brunes

No.	Pos.	Nation	Player
18	MF	NOR	Ulrik Mathisen
21	MF	NOR	Magnus Nordengen Knudsen
22	DF	NOR	Philip Slørdahl
23	MF	NOR	Gjermund Åsen (on loan from Rosenborg)
24	DF	SWE	Tom Pettersson
25	MF	NOR	Eskil Edh
26	DF	NOR	Lars Ranger
28	MF	NOR	Apipon Tongnoy
30	DF	NGR	Igoh Ogbu
31	MF	NOR	Martin Bergum
33	MF	NOR	Henrik Skogvold
40	GK	NOR	Jørgen Sveinhaug
90	FW	SWE	Daniel Gustavsson

=== Out on loan ===
Note: Flags indicate national team as defined under FIFA eligibility rules; some limited exceptions apply. Players may hold more than one non-FIFA nationality.

No.	Pos.	Nation	Player
19	FW	NOR	Uranik Seferi (at Skeid)
27	FW	NOR	Alexander Hrcka Sannes (at Strømmen)

No.	Pos.	Nation	Player
—	DF	NOR	Erik Tobias Sandberg (at Jerv)

== Transfers ==
=== Winter ===
In: Note: Flags indicate national team as defined under FIFA eligibility rules; some limited exceptions apply. Players may hold more than one non-FIFA nationality.

No.	Pos.	Nation	Player
1	GK	BEL	Álex Craninx (on loan from Molde)
5	DF	NOR	Vetle Dragsnes (from Mjøndalen)
6	MF	FIN	Kaan Kairinen (from (Denmark) FC Midtjylland, previously on loan)
7	FW	NOR	Pål André Helland (from Rosenborg)
9	FW	NOR	Kent Håvard Eriksen (from Sandnes Ulf)
15	DF	NOR	Josef Baccay (loan return from Fredrikstad)
16	MF	NGR	Charles Ezeh (loan return from Øygarden)
17	FW	NOR	Jonatan Braut Brunes (from Florø, previously on loan)
19	MF	NOR	Uranik Seferi (from Kvik Halden)
23	MF	NOR	Gjermund Åsen (on loan from Rosenborg)
25	MF	NOR	Eskil Edh (promoted from junior squad)
30	DF	NGR	Igoh Ogbu (from Sogndal)

Out: Note: Flags indicate national team as defined under FIFA eligibility rules; some limited exceptions apply. Players may hold more than one non-FIFA nationality.

No.	Pos.	Nation	Player
5	DF	NOR	Simen Rafn (to Aalesund)
7	MF	NOR	Torbjørn Kallevåg (to Aalesund)
9	FW	ISL	Tryggvi Hrafn Haraldsson (to (Iceland) Valur)
16	FW	ISL	Björn Bergmann Sigurðarson (to Molde)
17	FW	NOR	Kristoffer Ødemarksbakken (on loan to Aalesund, previously on loan at Ull/Kisa)
21	MF	NOR	Magnus Nordengen Knudsen (on loan to Ull/Kisa)
23	DF	NOR	Marius Amundsen (retired)
24	DF	NOR	Erik Tobias Sandberg (on loan to Jerv)
25	GK	BEL	Jo Coppens (to (Germany) Unterhaching)
28	MF	NOR	Apipon Tongnoy (on loan to Skeid)
29	GK	NOR	Emil Ødegaard (on loan to Stjørdals-Blink, previously on loan at Grorud)
33	DF	NOR	Aleksander Melgalvis (to HamKam)
88	FW	ISL	Arnor Smarason (to (Iceland) Valur)

=== Summer ===
In: Note: Flags indicate national team as defined under FIFA eligibility rules; some limited exceptions apply. Players may hold more than one non-FIFA nationality.

No.	Pos.	Nation	Player
1	GK	NOR	Knut-André Skjærstein (from KFUM)
15	DF	NOR	Josef Baccay (loan return from Kongsvinger)
21	MF	NOR	Magnus Nordengen Knudsen (loan return from Ull/Kisa)
24	DF	SWE	Tom Pettersson (from (United States) FC Cincinnati)
28	MF	NOR	Apipon Tongnoy (loan return from Skeid)
31	MF	NOR	Martin Bergum (promoted from junior squad)
33	MF	NOR	Henrik Skogvold (promoted from junior squad)
40	GK	NOR	Jørgen Sveinhaug (promoted from junior squad)

Out: Note: Flags indicate national team as defined under FIFA eligibility rules; some limited exceptions apply. Players may hold more than one non-FIFA nationality.

No.	Pos.	Nation	Player
1	GK	BEL	Álex Craninx (loan return to Molde)
9	FW	NOR	Kent Håvard Eriksen (to Mjøndalen)
15	DF	NOR	Josef Baccay (on loan to Kongsvinger)
16	MF	NGR	Charles Ezeh (released)
19	FW	NOR	Uranik Seferi (on loan to Skeid)
27	FW	NOR	Alexander Hrcka Sannes (on loan to Strømmen)
–	GK	NOR	Emil Ødegaard (to KFUM, previously on loan at Stjørdals-Blink)

== Competitions ==
=== Eliteserien ===
==== Results summary ====
Overall								Home						Away					
Pld	W	D	L	GF	GA	GD	Pts	W	D	L	GF	GA	GD	W	D	L	GF	GA	GD
30	14	7	9	49	40	+9	49	8	3	4	23	13	+10	6	4	5	26	27	−1

Last updated: 12 December 2021.

==== Results by round ====
Round	1	2	3	4	5	6	7	8	9	10	11	12	13	14	15	16	17	18	19	20	21	22	23	24	25	26	27	28	29	30
Ground	A	H	A	H	H	A	H	A	H	A	H	A	H	A	H	A	A	H	A	H	A	H	A	H	A	H	A	H	A	H
Result	W	W	L	L	W	L	W	W	W	D	W	D	D	D	L	W	W	L	W	L	L	D	L	W	W	D	L	W	D	W
Position	5	2	4	6	3	7	5	3	2	2	2	2	2	3	4	4	3	5	5	5	6	6	6	6	5	6	6	4	5	4

A = Away; H = Home; W = Win; D = Draw; L = Loss

==== Results ====
16 May 2021 3	Strømsgodset	3–1	Lillestrøm	Drammen
18:00 CEST (UTC+2)	Ogbu 6' (o.g.); Stengel 17' (pen.) (yellow card) 63'; Mawa (yellow card) 80'; Friday 86'; Maigaard (yellow card) 90+5'	Report	Ranger (yellow card) 50'; Ogbu 74'	Stadium: Marienlyst Stadion; Attendance: 0 Referee: Espen Eskås

24 May 2021 4	Lillestrøm	1–3	Viking	Lillestrøm
18:00 CEST (UTC+2)	Lars Ranger (yellow card) 41'; Ogbu (yellow card) 50'; Helland (yellow card) 90+3'; Brunes 90+4'	Report	Tripic 23'; Vikstøl 40' (yellow card) 45+2'; Løkberg (yellow card) 70'; Pattynama (yellow card) 79'; Friðjónsson 83'; Bell (yellow card) 86'	Stadium: Åråsen Stadion; Attendance: 0 Referee: Rohit Saggi

27 May 2021 5	Lillestrøm	1–0	Odd	Lillestrøm
18:00 CEST (UTC+2)	Lehne Olsen 36'; Garnås (yellow card) 61'	Report	Rólantsson (yellow card) 45'; Bakenga (yellow card) 81'	Stadium: Åråsen Stadion; Attendance: 20; Referee: Kristoffer Hagenes

30 May 2021 6	Kristiansund	1–0	Lillestrøm	Kristiansund
18:00 CEST (UTC+2)	Aasbak (yellow card) 41'; Kartum (yellow card) 70'; Bye 83'	Report	Ranger (yellow card) 1'	Stadium: Kristiansund Stadion; Attendance: 600; Referee: Tore Hansen

13 June 2021 7	Lillestrøm	2–1	Haugesund	Lillestrøm
18:00 CEST (UTC+2)	Lehne Olsen 24', 43' (pen.); Kairinen (penalty missed) 47'; Mathew (yellow card) 78'; Helland (yellow card) 87'; Garnås (yellow card) 90+6'	Report	Liseth 21'; Therkildsen (yellow card) 26'; Stølås (yellow card) 42'; Ndour (red card) 78'; Sande (yellow card) 90'	Stadium: Åråsen Stadion; Attendance: 600; Referee: Kai Erik Steen (first half) & Rohit Saggi (second half)

20 June 2021 8	Tromsø	1–2	Lillestrøm	Tromsø
18:00 CEST (UTC+2)	Mikkelsen 26'	Report	Lehne Olsen 2', 52'; Ranger (yellow card) 24'	Stadium: Alfheim Stadion; Attendance: 2,000; Referee: Mohammad Usman Aslam

25 June 2021 9	Lillestrøm	2–0	Rosenborg	Lillestrøm
20:00 CEST (UTC+2)	Helland 12'; Åsen 90+5'	Report	Tagseth (yellow card) 45+2'; Reitan (yellow card) 54'; Hoff (yellow card) 71'	Stadium: Åråsen Stadion; Attendance: 2,000; Referee: Ola Hobber Nilsen

30 June 2021 10	Brann	1–1	Lillestrøm	Bergen
20:00 CEST (UTC+2)	Bamba 58'	Report	Ranger (yellow card) 68'; Lehne Olsen 87'	Stadium: Brann Stadion; Attendance: 3,410; Referee: Svein Oddvar Moen

4 July 2021 11	Lillestrøm	2–1	Mjøndalen	Lillestrøm
18:00 CEST (UTC+2)	Thomas Lehne Olsen 65', 70' (yellow card) 90+3'; Mathew (yellow card) 89'	Report	Sveen (yellow card) 52'; Brustad 90+2'	Stadium: Åråsen Stadion; Attendance: 2,000; Referee: Sigurd Smehus Kringstad

11 July 2021 12	Vålerenga	2–2	Lillestrøm	Oslo
15:30 CEST (UTC+2)	Dønnum 53'; Näsberg (yellow card) 67'; Udahl 84'	Report	Ogbu (yellow card) 10'; Ranger 24'; Lehne Olsen 43'; Dragsnes (yellow card) 62'; Edh (yellow card) 79'	Stadium: Intility Arena; Attendance: 6,147; Referee: Kai Erik Steen

18 July 2021 13	Lillestrøm	1–1	Molde	Lillestrøm
18:00 CEST (UTC+2)	Ogbu (yellow card) 75'; Ranger 90+2'	Report	Hussain 42'; Knudtzon (yellow card) 60'; Linde (yellow card) 71'	Stadium: Åråsen Stadion; Attendance: 2,000; Referee: Ola Hobber Nilsen

21 July 2021 1	Stabæk	2–3	Lillestrøm	Bærum
19:00 CEST (UTC+2)	Edvardsen 55'; Moe (yellow card) 60'; Geelmuyden 77' (yellow card) 89'; Shala (yellow card) 78'	Report	Mathew 9'; Lehne Olsen 66', 71'; Krogstad (yellow card) 81'	Stadium: Nadderud Stadion; Attendance: 1,773; Referee: Tom Harald Hagen

28 July 2021 2	Lillestrøm	2–0	Sarpsborg 08	Lillestrøm
19:00 CEST (UTC+2)	Kairinen 55'; Lehne Olsen 58'	Report	Ødegaard (yellow card) 27'; Thomassen (yellow card) 66'; Næss (yellow card) 72'; Koné (yellow card) 90+1'; Dyrestam (yellow card) 90+2'	Stadium: Åråsen Stadion; Attendance: 2,000; Referee: Mohammad Usman Aslam

8 August 2021 14	Sandefjord	1–1	Lillestrøm	Sandefjord
18:00 CEST (UTC+2)	Kurtovic (yellow card) 9'; Jónsson 50'	Report	Ranger (yellow card) 11'; Lehne Olsen 59'; Edh (yellow card) 90+5'	Stadium: Release Arena; Attendance: 2,000; Referee: Tore Hansen

15 August 2021 15	Lillestrøm	0–1	Bodø/Glimt	Lillestrøm
18:00 CEST (UTC+2)		Report	Lode (yellow card) 11'; Berg (penalty missed) 58'; Botheim 78'	Stadium: Åråsen Stadion; Attendance: 4,500; Referee: Espen Eskås

22 August 2021 16	Haugesund	0–3	Lillestrøm	Haugesund
18:00 CEST (UTC+2)	Hansen (yellow card) 89'; Velde (yellow card) 90'	Report	Gustavsson 21', 23' (yellow card) 64'; Kairinen (yellow card) 34'; Garnås (yellow card) 60'; Edh (yellow card) 90+1'; Fredriksen 90+3' (o.g.)	Stadium: Haugesund Stadion; Attendance: 2,215; Referee: Sivert Amland

28 August 2021 17	Mjøndalen	1–2	Lillestrøm	Mjøndalen
18:00 CEST (UTC+2)	Sporrong 4'; Sell (yellow card) 30'	Report	Pettersson 43'; Lehne Olsen 46' (yellow card) 64'; Brunes (yellow card) 90+5'	Stadium: Consto Arena; Attendance: 1,500; Referee: Kristoffer Hagenes

11 September 2021 18	Lillestrøm	2–3	Brann	Lillestrøm
18:00 CEST (UTC+2)	Garnås (yellow card) 39' (goal) 59'; Lehne Olsen 71'	Report	Taylor 17'; Knudsen (yellow card) 34'; Finne 65'; Heggebø 74'	Stadium: Åråsen Stadion; Attendance: 4,500; Referee: Ola Hobber Nilsen

18 September 2021 19	Odd	2–3	Lillestrøm	Skien
18:00 CEST (UTC+2)	Svendsen 2', 31'	Report	Lehne Olsen 22', 53'; Pettersson 25'; Slørdahl (yellow card) 57'	Stadium: Skagerak Arena; Attendance: 3,295; Referee: Tommy Skjerven

25 September 2021 20	Lillestrøm	1–2	Tromsø	Lillestrøm
18:00 CEST (UTC+2)	Ogbu (yellow card) 68'; Lehne Olsen 90+1' (pen.)	Report	Vesterlund 27' (yellow card) 77'; Mikkelsen 62'; Psyché (yellow card) 71'	Stadium: Åråsen Stadion; Attendance: 4,189; Referee: Rohit Saggi

2 October 2021 21	Sarpsborg 08	2–1	Lillestrøm	Sarpsborg
18:00 CEST (UTC+2)	Lindseth 28'; Čanađija (yellow card) 36'; Koné 64'	Report	Lehne Olsen 57'	Stadium: Sarpsborg Stadion; Attendance: 4,937; Referee: Marius Hansen Grøtta

16 October 2021 22	Lillestrøm	0–0	Kristiansund	Lillestrøm
18:00 CEST (UTC+2)	Garnås (yellow card) 49'; Dragsnes (yellow card) 54'; Mathew (yellow card) 71'; Ogbu (yellow card) 88' (yellow-red card) 90+7'	Report	Coly (yellow card) 78'	Stadium: Åråsen Stadion; Attendance: 5,652; Referee: Espen Eskås

23 October 2021 23	Viking	5–1	Lillestrøm	Stavanger
16:00 CEST (UTC+2)	Sebulonsen 3'; Tangen 49'; Berisha 68', 73', 82'	Report	Ranger (yellow card) 19'; Krogstad 64'	Stadium: Viking Stadion; Attendance: 11,026; Referee: Tom Harald Hagen

27 October 2021 24	Lillestrøm	3–0	Stabæk	Lillestrøm
18:00 CEST (UTC+2)	Garnås 56'; Lehne Olsen 63', 83'; Svendsen (yellow card) 69'	Report	Haugen (yellow card) 38'	Stadium: Åråsen Stadion; Attendance: 3,594; Referee: Kai Erik Steen

30 October 2021 25	Rosenborg	1–3	Lillestrøm	Trondheim
18:00 CET (UTC+1)	Hovland 22'	Report	Mathew 68'; Lehne Olsen 79'; Pettersson 86'	Stadium: Lerkendal Stadion; Attendance: 11,126; Referee: Tore Hansen

7 November 2021 26	Lillestrøm	0–0	Vålerenga	Lillestrøm
19:00 CET (UTC+1)	Gustavsson (yellow card) 70'	Report	Tollås (yellow card) 70'	Stadium: Åråsen Stadion; Attendance: 10,504; Referee: Kristoffer Hagenes

21 November 2021 27	Bodø/Glimt	2–0	Lillestrøm	Bodø
17:00 CET (UTC+1)	Fet 30'; Botheim 45'; Høibråten (yellow card) 90+23'; Haikin (yellow card) 90+25'	Report	Knudsen (yellow card) 5'; Pettersson (yellow card) 90+9'; Lehne Olsen (yellow card) 90+25'	Stadium: Aspmyra Stadion; Attendance: 4,141; Referee: Ola Hobber Nilsen

27 November 2021 28	Lillestrøm	4–1	Strømsgodset	Lillestrøm
18:00 CET (UTC+1)	Lehne Olsen 21', 44', 61'; Dragsnes 45+1'	Report	Leifsson (yellow card) 18'; Krasniqi (yellow card) 53'; Hove 86'; Gulliksen (yellow card) 90+1'	Stadium: Åråsen Stadion; Attendance: 3,797; Referee: Sivert Amland

5 December 2021 29	Molde	3–3	Lillestrøm	Molde
17:00 CET (UTC+1)	Risa 63'; Hestad 79'; Omoijuanfo 82'; Bjørnbak (yellow card) 85'; Brynhildsen (yellow card) 90'; Eikrem (yellow card) 90+5'	Report	Åsen 32'; Edh 46' (yellow card) 90+4'; Ogbu (yellow card) 63'; Lehne Olsen 88'; Garnås (yellow card) 90'	Stadium: Aker Stadion; Attendance: 4,673; Referee: Rohit Saggi

12 December 2021 30	Lillestrøm	2–0	Sandefjord	Lillestrøm
17:00 CET (UTC+1)	Dragsnes 29'; Ranger (yellow card) 43'; Mathisen 81'	Report		Stadium: Åråsen Stadion; Attendance: 4,748; Referee: Kristoffer Hagenes

==== Table ====
Pos	Team	Pld	W	D	L	GF	GA	GD	Pts	Qualification or relegation
2	Molde	30	18	6	6	70	40	+30	60	Qualification for the Europa Conference League second qualifying round (Note: Since the winners of the 2021 Norwegian Cup, Molde, have already qualified for European competitions based on league position, the last European spot was passed down to the fourth placed team, Lillestrøm.)
3	Viking	30	17	6	7	60	47	+13	57	Qualification for the Europa Conference League second qualifying round
4	Lillestrøm	30	14	7	9	49	40	+9	49	Qualification for the Europa Conference League second qualifying round
5	Rosenborg	30	13	9	8	58	42	+16	48	
6	Kristiansund	30	14	4	12	41	46	−5	46	

Source: Football Association of Norway (in Norwegian)
Rules for classification: 1) Points; 2) Goal difference; 3) Goals scored; 4) Head-to-head points; 5) Head-to-head goal difference; 6) Head-to-head away goals scored (only if between two teams); 7) Head-to-head goals scored; 8) Play-off (only used to decide champions or relegation).

=== Norwegian Cup ===
24 July 2021 First round	Fu/Vo	0–4	Lillestrøm	Oppåkermoen
15:00 CEST (UTC+2)	Nøvik (yellow card) 45'; Grahn (yellow card) 80'	Report	Brunes 31' (pen.), 57'; Garnås 57'; Rosenkilde 79' (o.g.); Ranger (yellow card) 85'	Stadium: Funnefoss Stadion; Referee: Ali al Hatam

1 August 2021 Second round	Skeid	1–2 (a.e.t.)	Lillestrøm	Oslo
16:15 CEST (UTC+2)	Buduson 58' (pen.)	Report	Svendsen 52'; Ogbu (yellow card) 57'; Garnås (yellow card) 74'; Lehne Olsen 96'	Stadium: Nordre Åsen; Attendance: 650; Referee: Rohit Saggi

22 September 2021 Third round	Grorud	2–3 (a.e.t.)	Lillestrøm	Oslo
18:00 CEST (UTC+2)	Bredeli 35' (pen.); Drammeh 40'; K. Mankowitz (yellow card) 53'; P. Mankowitz (yellow card) 100'	Report	Mathew 26'; Krogstad (yellow card) 39'; Dragsnes 89'; Lehne Olsen 107'	Stadium: Grorud matchbane Attendance: 580; Referee: Svein Tore Sinnes

Fourth round took place during the 2022 season.
