= 2022 Lillestrøm SK season =

Lillestrøm
2022 season
- Chairman: Morten Kokkim
- Head coach: Geir Bakke
- Stadium: Åråsen stadion
- Eliteserien: 4th
- 2021 Norwegian Cup: Quarter-finals
- 2022 Norwegian Cup: Fourth round
- UEFA Europa Conference League: Third qualifying round
- Top goalscorer: League: Akor Adams (8); All: Hólmbert Friðjónsson (13)
- Highest home attendance: 10,527 vs Vålerenga Fotball
- Average home league attendance: 6,759
| Home colours | Away colours |

The 2022 season was Lillestrøm SK's 105th season in existence and the club's second consecutive season in the top flight of Norwegian football. In addition to the domestic league, Lillestrøm SK participated in this season's edition of the Norwegian Football Cup and the UEFA Europa Conference League.

== Players ==
=== First team squad ===
As of 7 July 2022

Note: Flags indicate national team as defined under FIFA eligibility rules; some limited exceptions apply. Players may hold more than one non-FIFA nationality.

| No. | Pos. | Nation | Player |
|---|---|---|---|
| 1 | GK | NOR | Knut-André Skjærstein |
| 2 | DF | NOR | Lars Ranger |
| 3 | DF | NOR | Colin Rösler |
| 4 | DF | NOR | Espen Garnås |
| 5 | DF | NOR | Vetle Dragsnes |
| 6 | MF | FIN | Kaan Kairinen |
| 7 | FW | NOR | Pål André Helland |
| 8 | MF | NGA | Ifeanyi Mathew |
| 9 | FW | NGA | Akor Adams |
| 10 | MF | NOR | Thomas Lehne Olsen |
| 11 | FW | NOR | Tobias Svendsen |
| 12 | GK | NOR | Mads Hedenstad Christiansen |
| 14 | MF | NOR | Magnus Nordengen Knudsen (on loan from Rostov) |
| 16 | MF | NOR | Marius Lundemo |

| No. | Pos. | Nation | Player |
|---|---|---|---|
| 17 | MF | NOR | Elias Solberg |
| 20 | FW | KOS | Ylldren Ibrahimaj |
| 21 | FW | ISL | Hólmbert Friðjónsson (on loan from Holstein Kiel) |
| 23 | MF | NOR | Gjermund Åsen (Captain) |
| 24 | DF | SWE | Tom Pettersson (Vice-captain) |
| 25 | MF | NOR | Eskil Edh |
| 26 | MF | NOR | Dylan Murugesapillai |
| 27 | DF | CIV | Ibrahim Cissé (on loan from Zoman FC) |
| 29 | GK | NOR | Jørgen Sveinhaug |
| 30 | DF | NGA | Igoh Ogbu |
| 33 | MF | NOR | Henrik Skogvold |
| 58 | FW | DEN | Aral Şimşir (on loan from Midtjylland) |
| 77 | MF | DEN | Frederik Holst |

=== Out on loan ===
Note: Flags indicate national team as defined under FIFA eligibility rules; some limited exceptions apply. Players may hold more than one non-FIFA nationality.

| No. | Pos. | Nation | Player |
|---|---|---|---|
| 18 | MF | NOR | Ulrik Mathisen (at Sogndal) |
| 19 | FW | NOR | Uranik Seferi (at Kvik Halden) |

| No. | Pos. | Nation | Player |
|---|---|---|---|
| 22 | DF | NOR | Philip Slørdahl (at Sogndal) |
| 31 | MF | NOR | Martin Bergum (at Ull/Kisa) |

== Transfers ==
=== Winter ===
In: Note: Flags indicate national team as defined under FIFA eligibility rules; some limited exceptions apply. Players may hold more than one non-FIFA nationality.

| No. | Pos. | Nation | Player |
|---|---|---|---|
| 3 | DF | NOR | Colin Rösler (from (Netherlands) NAC Breda) |
| 9 | FW | NGA | Akor Adams (from Sogndal) |
| 14 | MF | NOR | Magnus Knudsen (on loan from (Russia) Rostov) |
| 15 | MF | GHA | Eric Taylor (on loan from (Ghana) New Life Academy) |
| 20 | FW | KOS | Ylldren Ibrahimaj (from (Russia) Ural Yekaterinburg) |
| 21 | FW | ISL | Hólmbert Friðjónsson (on loan from (Germany) Holstein Kiel) |
| 23 | MF | NOR | Gjermund Åsen (from Rosenborg, previously on loan) |
| 26 | MF | NOR | Dylan Murugesapillai (promoted from junior squad) |
| 77 | MF | DEN | Frederik Holst (from (Sweden) Elfsborg) |

Out: Note: Flags indicate national team as defined under FIFA eligibility rules; some limited exceptions apply. Players may hold more than one non-FIFA nationality.

| No. | Pos. | Nation | Player |
|---|---|---|---|
| 3 | DF | NOR | Simen Kind Mikalsen (to Råde) |
| 10 | FW | NOR | Thomas Lehne Olsen (to (United Arab Emirates) Shabab Al Ahli) |
| 14 | MF | NOR | Fredrik Krogstad (to Stabæk) |
| 15 | DF | NOR | Josef Baccay (to Odd) |
| 17 | FW | NOR | Jonatan Braut Brunes (on loan to Start) |
| 18 | MF | NOR | Ulrik Mathisen (on loan to Sogndal) |
| 19 | FW | NOR | Uranik Seferi (on loan to Kvik Halden, previously on loan at Skeid) |
| 21 | MF | NOR | Magnus Knudsen (to (Russia) Rostov) |
| 22 | DF | NOR | Philip Slørdahl (on loan to Sandefjord) |
| 27 | FW | NOR | Alexander Hrcka Sannes (retired, previously on loan at Strømmen) |
| 31 | MF | NOR | Martin Bergum (on loan to Ull/Kisa) |
| 90 | FW | SWE | Daniel Gustavsson (to (Sweden) Örebro) |
| — | DF | NOR | Erik Tobias Sandberg (to Jerv, previously on loan) |

=== Summer ===
In: Note: Flags indicate national team as defined under FIFA eligibility rules; some limited exceptions apply. Players may hold more than one non-FIFA nationality.

| No. | Pos. | Nation | Player |
|---|---|---|---|
| 10 | FW | NOR | Thomas Lehne Olsen (from (United Arab Emirates) Shabab Al Ahli) |
| 16 | MF | NOR | Marius Lundemo (from (Cyprus) APOEL) |
| 17 | MF | NOR | Elias Solberg (from (Italy) Juventus Primavera) |
| 22 | DF | NOR | Philip Slørdahl (loan return from Sandefjord) |
| 27 | DF | CIV | Ibrahim Cissé (on loan from (Ivory Coast) Zoman) |
| 58 | FW | DEN | Aral Şimşir (on loan from (Denmark) Midtjylland) |

Out: Note: Flags indicate national team as defined under FIFA eligibility rules; some limited exceptions apply. Players may hold more than one non-FIFA nationality.

| No. | Pos. | Nation | Player |
|---|---|---|---|
| 11 | MF | NOR | Tobias Hammer Svendsen (hiatus) |
| 15 | MF | GHA | Eric Taylor (loan return to (Ghana) New Life Academy) |
| 17 | FW | NOR | Jonatan Braut Brunes (to Strømsgodset, previously on loan at Start) |
| 22 | DF | NOR | Philip Slørdahl (on loan to Sogndal) |

== Competitions ==
=== Eliteserien ===
==== Results summary ====
| Overall | | | | | | | | Home | | | | | | Away | | | | | |
| Pld | W | D | L | GF | GA | GD | Pts | W | D | L | GF | GA | GD | W | D | L | GF | GA | GD |
|---|---|---|---|---|---|---|---|---|---|---|---|---|---|---|---|---|---|---|---|
| 30 | 16 | 5 | 9 | 49 | 34 | +15 | 53 | 9 | 2 | 4 | 24 | 13 | +11 | 7 | 3 | 5 | 25 | 21 | +4 |

Last updated: 12 November 2022.

==== Results by round ====
| Round | 1 | 2 | 3 | 4 | 5 | 6 | 7 | 8 | 9 | 10 | 11 | 12 | 13 | 14 | 15 | 16 | 17 | 18 | 19 | 20 | 21 | 22 | 23 | 24 | 25 | 26 | 27 | 28 | 29 | 30 |
|---|---|---|---|---|---|---|---|---|---|---|---|---|---|---|---|---|---|---|---|---|---|---|---|---|---|---|---|---|---|---|
| Ground | A | H | A | H | A | H | A | H | A | H | A | A | H | A | H | A | H | A | H | H | A | H | A | H | A | H | A | H | A | H |
| Result | D | W | W | W | D | W | W | W | D | W | L | W | L | W | W | W | D | L | W | D | L | W | L | L | W | L | W | L | L | W |
| Position | 7 | 3 | 2 | 1 | 2 | 2 | 1 | 1 | 1 | 1 | 1 | 1 | 1 | 1 | 1 | 2 | 2 | 3 | 2 | 3 | 3 | 2 | 2 | 4 | 4 | 4 | 4 | 4 | 4 | 4 |

A = Away; H = Home; W = Win; D = Draw; L = Loss

==== Results ====
| 2 April 2022 1 | HamKam | 2–2 | Lillestrøm | Hamar |
| 16:00 CEST (UTC+2) | Eriksen 11'; Enkerud 21' | Report | Ogbu (yellow card) 33'; Edh 66'; Adams 70' | Stadium: Briskeby Stadion; Attendance: 6,500; Referee: Tore Hansen |

| 9 April 2022 2 | Lillestrøm | 4–0 | Jerv | Lillestrøm |
| 16:00 CEST (UTC+2) | Adams 12'; Helland 40'; Ogbu 71'; Ibrahimaj 90+5' | Report | | Stadium: Åråsen Stadion; Attendance: 5,121; Referee: Sigurd Smehus Kringstad |

| 18 April 2022 3 | Molde | 1–2 | Lillestrøm | Molde |
| 18:00 CEST (UTC+2) | Haugan (yellow card) 54'; Haugen 79'; Hussain (yellow card) 84' | Report | Ogbu 18'; Edh (yellow card) 29'; Åsen (yellow card) 70'; Friðjónsson 90+7' | Stadium: Aker Stadion; Attendance: 5,899; Referee: Kai Erik Steen |

| 24 April 2022 4 | Lillestrøm | 1–0 | Haugesund | Lillestrøm |
| 18:00 CEST (UTC+2) | Knudsen (yellow card) 58'; Friðjónsson 87' | Report | Reese (yellow card) 61'; Selvik (yellow card) 79' | Stadium: Åråsen Stadion; Attendance: 4,902; Referee: Rohit Saggi |

| 28 April 2022 15 | Lillestrøm | 2–0 | Aalesund | Lillestrøm |
| 20:00 CEST (UTC+2) | Pettersson 9'; Ibrahimaj 33' | Report | Nordli (yellow card) 76' | Stadium: Åråsen Stadion; Attendance: 4,567; Referee: Sivert Øksnes Amland |

| 8 May 2022 5 | Bodø/Glimt | 1–1 | Lillestrøm | Bodø |
| 18:00 CEST (UTC+2) | Vetlesen (yellow card) 71'; Sampsted 82'; Høibråten (yellow card) 90+5' | Report | Adams 32'; Mathew (yellow card) 56'; Pettersson (yellow card) 73'; Knudsen (yellow card) 85' | Stadium: Aspmyra Stadion; Attendance: 5,060; Referee: Espen Eskås |

| 16 May 2022 6 | Lillestrøm | 1–0 | Sarpsborg 08 | Lillestrøm |
| 18:00 CEST (UTC+2) | Ibrahimaj 67' | Report | Utvik (yellow card) 9'; Høyland (yellow card) 53'; Ngouali (yellow card) 54'; Muhammed (yellow card) 90+3' | Stadium: Åråsen Stadion; Attendance: 9,394; Referee: Tore Hansen |

| 21 May 2022 7 | Sandefjord | 1–4 | Lillestrøm | Sandefjord |
| 16:00 CEST (UTC+2) | Taaje 3'; Damnjanovic Nilsson (yellow card) 72' | Report | Slørdahl 7' (o.g.); Storevik 25' (o.g.); Ogbu 43'; Adams 58'; Garnås (yellow card) 78' | Stadium: Release Arena; Attendance: 3,290; Referee: Daniel Higraff |

| 25 May 2022 8 | Lillestrøm | 2–0 | Vålerenga | Lillestrøm |
| 20:00 CEST (UTC+2) | Pettersson 63'; Garnås 80' | Report | Holm (yellow card) 68'; Zuta (yellow card) 84' | Stadium: Åråsen Stadion; Attendance: 10,527; Referee: Rohit Saggi |

| 29 May 2022 9 | Tromsø | 2–2 | Lillestrøm | Tromsø |
| 18:00 CEST (UTC+2) | Gundersen (yellow card) 9'; Kitolano 42'; Ebiye 90+2' | Report | Mathew 60'; Dragsnes 72'; Hedenstad (yellow card) 85'; Adams (yellow card) 90+4' | Stadium: Alfheim Stadion; Attendance: 2,689; Referee: Marius Hansen Grøtta |

| 19 June 2022 10 | Lillestrøm | 3–1 | Rosenborg | Lillestrøm |
| 18:00 CEST (UTC+2) | Mathew 32' (yellow card) 76'; Dragsnes 38'; Knudsen 87' | Report | Vecchia 16'; Skarsem (yellow card) 76'; Vagić (yellow card) 90+2' | Stadium: Åråsen Stadion; Attendance: 10,229; Referee: Espen Eskås |

| 26 June 2022 11 | Strømsgodset | 3–0 | Lillestrøm | Drammen |
| 18:00 CEST (UTC+2) | Vilsvik (yellow card) 13'; Jack 53'; Tokstad 76'; Myhra (yellow card) 81'; Stengel (yellow card) 90+3'; Salvesen 90+7' | Report | Dragsnes (yellow card) 13'; Garnås (yellow card) 22'; Ogbu (yellow card) 29'; Holst (yellow card) 65'; Åsen (red card) 83' | Stadium: Marienlyst Stadion; Attendance: 5,825; Referee: Tore Hansen |

| 3 July 2022 12 | Kristiansund | 1–3 | Lillestrøm | Kristiansund |
| 18:00 CEST (UTC+2) | Bye 20' (pen.); Jarl (yellow card) 57'; Williamsen (yellow card) 79' | Report | Adams 71', 84' (yellow card) 85'; Friðjónsson 87' | Stadium: Kristiansund Stadion; Attendance: 3,660; Referee: Svein Oddvar Moen |

| 10 July 2022 13 | Lillestrøm | 0–1 | Viking | Lillestrøm |
| 18:00 CEST (UTC+2) | Adams (yellow card) 56' | Report | Gunnarsson (yellow card) 83'; Vikstøl (yellow card) 87'; Ogbu 90+1' (o.g.) | Stadium: Åråsen Stadion; Attendance: 6,964; Referee: Kristoffer Hagenes |

| 17 July 2022 14 | Odd | 1–2 | Lillestrøm | Skien |
| 18:00 CEST (UTC+2) | Mesík (yellow card) 5'; Lauritsen 68' | Report | Knudsen 61'; Pettersson 90+2' | Stadium: Skagerak Arena; Attendance: 4,507; Referee: Espen Eskås |

| 31 July 2022 16 | Sarpsborg 08 | 0–2 | Lillestrøm | Sarpsborg |
| 15:30 CEST (UTC+2) | Lindseth (yellow card) 17'; Horn (yellow card) 30' (yellow-red card) 45+3'; Soltvedt (yellow card) 44'; Skålevik (yellow card) 45+7'; Utvik (yellow card) 75'; Salétros (yellow card) 75' (yellow-red card) 75' | Report | Hedenstad (yellow card) 45+7'; Helland 76' (pen.); Knudsen (yellow card) 77'; Friðjónsson 84'; Mathew (yellow card) 89' | Stadium: Sarpsborg Stadion; Attendance: 4,717; Referee: Rohit Saggi |

| 7 August 2022 17 | Lillestrøm | 1–1 | Tromsø | Lillestrøm |
| 18:00 CEST (UTC+2) | Hedenstad 90+4' | Report | Kitolano 36' (yellow card) 90+5' | Stadium: Åråsen Stadion; Attendance: 5,073; Referee: Svein Oddvar Moen |

| 14 August 2022 18 | Jerv | 1–0 | Lillestrøm | Grimstad |
| 18:00 CEST (UTC+2) | Fernandes (yellow card) 30'; Sandberg (yellow card) 52'; Şimşir 65' (pen.); Mafi (yellow card) 90' | Report | Ranger (yellow card) 81'; Ogbu (yellow card) 86'; Helland (yellow card) 90+1' | Stadium: Levermyr Stadion; Attendance: 2,176; Referee: Kai Erik Steen |

| 21 August 2022 19 | Lillestrøm | 3–0 | Sandefjord | Lillestrøm |
| 18:00 CEST (UTC+2) | Mathew (yellow card) 17'; Åsen 26'; Kairinen 52'; Dragsnes 68' | Report | Ordagić (yellow card) 54'; Winbo (yellow card) 76' | Stadium: Åråsen Stadion; Attendance: 5,308; Referee: Svein Tore Sinnes |

| 28 August 2022 20 | Lillestrøm | 1–1 | Kristiansund | Lillestrøm |
| 18:00 CEST (UTC+2) | Ranger (yellow card) 2'; Friðjónsson 23' | Report | Williamsen (yellow card) 17' (goal) 54' | Stadium: Åråsen Stadion; Attendance: 7,569; Referee: Sivert Øksnes Amland |

| 4 September 2022 21 | Vålerenga | 3–1 | Lillestrøm | Oslo |
| 20:00 CEST (UTC+2) | Sahraoui 22', 71'; Børven 45+1' | Report | Garnås (yellow card) 14' (goal) 51'; Rösler (yellow card) 70' | Stadium: Intility Arena; Attendance: 16,555; Referee: Svein Oddvar Moen |

| 10 September 2022 22 | Lillestrøm | 2–1 | Strømsgodset | Lillestrøm |
| 18:00 CEST (UTC+2) | Åsen 13'; Dragsnes 43'; Friðjónsson (yellow card) 83' | Report | Valsvik 80'; Boahene (yellow card) 90+3'; Brunes (yellow card) 90+4' | Stadium: Åråsen Stadion; Attendance: 4,807; Referee: Kristoffer Hagenes |

| 18 September 2022 23 | Rosenborg | 3–1 | Lillestrøm | Trondheim |
| 18:00 CEST (UTC+2) | Tengstedt 6' (yellow card) 75'; Giampaoli (yellow card) 8'; Sæter 11', 51'; Børkeeiet (yellow card) 47'; Dahl Reitan (yellow card) 88' | Report | Lehne Olsen 48'; Friðjónsson (yellow card) 88' | Stadium: Lerkendal Stadion; Attendance: 13,529; Referee: Rohit Saggi |

| 2 October 2022 24 | Lillestrøm | 1–4 | Bodø/Glimt | Lillestrøm |
| 18:00 CEST (UTC+2) | Ibrahimaj 32'; Dragsnes (yellow card) 82' | Report | Saltnes 29'; Espejord 52'; Mvuka (yellow card) 82'; Salvesen (yellow card) 85'; Vetlesen 87'; Pellegrino 90' (yellow card) 90'; Žugelj (yellow card) 90+3' | Stadium: Åråsen Stadion; Attendance: 7,258; Referee: Tore Hansen |

| 9 October 2022 25 | Viking | 0–3 | Lillestrøm | Stavanger |
| 17:00 CEST (UTC+2) | Vikstøl (yellow card) 40'; Diop (yellow card) 53'; Kabran (yellow card) 81' | Report | Knudsen 18'; Ogbu (yellow card) 21'; Lehne Olsen 47', 58' | Stadium: Viking Stadion; Attendance: 12,136; Referee: Espen Eskås |

| 16 October 2022 26 | Lillestrøm | 0–1 | Molde | Lillestrøm |
| 19:00 CEST (UTC+2) | Lehne Olsen (yellow card) 23' | Report | Kaasa (yellow card) 55'; Hussain 90+5' | Stadium: Åråsen Stadion; Attendance: 6,639; Referee: Tom Harald Hagen |

| 23 October 2022 27 | Haugesund | 0–1 | Lillestrøm | Haugesund |
| 17:00 CEST (UTC+2) | Zafeiris (penalty missed) 2'; Eskesen (yellow card) 37' | Report | Lehne Olsen 28'; Ogbu (yellow card) 60' | Stadium: Haugesund Stadion; Attendance: 4,139; Referee: Mohammad Usman Aslam |

| 30 October 2022 28 | Lillestrøm | 0–2 | Odd | Lillestrøm |
| 17:00 CET (UTC+1) | Garnås (yellow card) 54'; Helland (yellow card) 90' | Report | Wahlstedt (yellow card) 65'; Ingebrigtsen 82' (yellow card) 82'; Gjengaar 87' | Stadium: Åråsen Stadion; Attendance: 5,957; Referee: Ola Hobber Nilsen |

| 6 November 2022 29 | Aalesund | 2–1 | Lillestrøm | Ålesund |
| 17:00 CET (UTC+1) | Nenass 10'; Hopland 68' | Report | Adams 23'; Knudsen (yellow card) 62'; Ogbu (yellow card) 67' | Stadium: Color Line Stadion; Attendance: 6,902; Referee: Daniel Higraff |

| 13 November 2022 30 | Lillestrøm | 3–1 | HamKam | Lillestrøm |
| 17:00 CET (UTC+1) | Lehne Olsen 22' (yellow card) 83'; Adams 56'; Dragsnes 80' | Report | Onsrud 11'; Kurucay (yellow card) 90' | Stadium: Åråsen Stadion; Attendance: 7,073; Referee: Marius Hansen Grøtta |

==== Table ====
| Pos | Team | Pld | W | D | L | GF | GA | GD | Pts | Qualification or relegation |
|---|---|---|---|---|---|---|---|---|---|---|
| 2 | Bodø/Glimt | 30 | 18 | 6 | 6 | 86 | 41 | +45 | 60 | Qualification for the Europa Conference League second qualifying round |
| 3 | Rosenborg | 30 | 16 | 8 | 6 | 69 | 44 | +25 | 56 | Qualification for the Europa Conference League second qualifying round |
| 4 | Lillestrøm | 30 | 16 | 5 | 9 | 49 | 34 | +15 | 53 | |
| 5 | Odd | 30 | 13 | 6 | 11 | 43 | 45 | −2 | 45 | |
| 6 | Vålerenga | 30 | 13 | 5 | 12 | 52 | 49 | +3 | 44 | |

Source: Football Association of Norway (in Norwegian)
Rules for classification: 1) Points; 2) Goal difference; 3) Goals scored; 4) Head-to-head points; 5) Head-to-head goal difference; 6) Head-to-head goals scored.

=== Norwegian Football Cup ===
==== 2021 ====
| 13 March 2022 Fourth round | Nardo | 0–4 | Lillestrøm | Trondheim |
| 15:00 CET (UTC+1) | Haukeberg (yellow card) 19'; Sandvik (yellow card) 84' | Report | Helland 29', 53'; Pettersson 36'; Adams 87' | Stadium: EXTRA Arena; Attendance: 1,050; Referee: Sivert Øksnes Amland |

| 20 March 2022 Quarter-finals | Bodø/Glimt | 4–1 | Lillestrøm | Bodø |
| 20:00 CET (UTC+1) | Espejord 37'; Hagen 53'; Pellegrino 87'; Boniface 90+2' | Report | Dragsnes 13'; Mathew (yellow card) 60'; Friðjónsson (yellow card) 67' | Stadium: Aspmyra Stadion; Attendance: 3,181; Referee: Kristoffer Hagenes |

==== 2022 ====
| 4 May 2022 First round | Eidsvold | 0–7 | Lillestrøm | Eidsvoll |
| 18:00 CEST (UTC+2) | Ulseth (yellow card) 88' | Report | Adams 21'; Holst 32'; Ranger 48'; Friðjónsson 51', 66', 69'; Mathew 67'; Murugesapillai (yellow card) 87' | Stadium: Eidsvoll stadion Attendance: 1,300; Referee: Eivind Bodding |

| 22 June 2022 Second round | Junkeren | 1–2 | Lillestrøm | Bodø |
| 18:00 CEST (UTC+2) | Chooly 16' (yellow card) 86' | Report | Friðjónsson 23'; Helland 67' | Stadium: Nordlandshallen; Attendance: 658; Referee: Martin Berg |

| 29 June 2022 Third round | Lillestrøm | 1–0 | Aalesund | Lillestrøm |
| 18:00 CEST (UTC+2) | Friðjónsson 45+2'; Dragsnes (yellow card) 55' | Report | | Stadium: Åråsen stadion Attendance: 3,953; Referee: Rohit Saggi |

Fourth round took place during the 2023 season.

=== UEFA Europa Conference League ===
==== Second qualifying round ====
| 21 July 2022 First leg | SJK (Finland) | 0–1 | (Norway) Lillestrøm | Seinäjoki, Finland |
| 19:00 EEST (UTC+3) | Jervis (penalty missed) 66'; Samson (yellow card) 80'; Rojas (yellow card) 88' | Report | Ranger (yellow card) 23'; Ogbu (yellow card) 58'; Dragsnes 68'; Friðjónsson (yellow card) 82' | Stadium: OmaSP Stadion; Attendance: 3,613; Referee: Marcel Birsan (Romania) |

| 28 July 2022 Second leg | Lillestrøm (Norway) | 5–2 (6–2 agg.) | (Finland) SJK | Lillestrøm, Norway |
| 19:00 CEST (UTC+2) | Mathew 23'; Friðjónsson 42', 56', 61'; Rösler 85' | Report | Laine 31'; Rojas 90+1' | Stadium: Åråsen Stadion; Attendance: 3,829; Referee: Iwan Arwel Griffith (Wales) |

==== Third qualifying round ====
| 4 August 2022 First leg | Lillestrøm (Norway) | 1–3 | (Belgium) Antwerp | Lillestrøm, Norway |
| 19:00 CEST (UTC+2) | Friðjónsson (yellow card) 34'; Knudsen 45+3'; Ibrahimaj (yellow card) 48' | Report | Almeida 5'; Nainggolan 50', 86'; Janssen (yellow card) 62'; Gerkens (yellow card) 69'; Valencia (yellow card) 85' | Stadium: Åråsen Stadion; Attendance: 4,927; Referee: Daniel Stefański (Poland) |

| 11 August 2022 Second leg | Antwerp (Belgium) | 2–0 (5–1 agg.) | (Norway) Lillestrøm | Antwerp, Belgium |
| 19:30 CEST (UTC+2) | Valencia 11'; Janssen (yellow card) 66'; Verstraete 69' (yellow card) 71' | Report | Helland (yellow card) 81'; Svendsen (yellow card) 84' | Stadium: Bosuilstadion; Attendance: 9,586; Referee: Duje Strukan (Croatia) |
