= 2020 Lillestrøm SK season =

Lillestrøm
2020 season
- Chairman: Morten Kokkim
- Head coach: Geir Bakke
- Stadium: Åråsen Stadion
- 1. divisjon: 2nd (Promoted)
- Norwegian Cup: Canceled due to the COVID-19 pandemic
- Top goalscorer: League: Thomas Lehne Olsen (9); All: Thomas Lehne Olsen (9)
Home colours	Away colours

The 2020 campaign was Lillestrøm's 103rd competitive season since the club were founded.

== Season events ==
On 12 June, the Norwegian Football Federation announced that a maximum of 200 home fans would be allowed to attend the upcoming seasons matches.

On 10 September, the Norwegian Football Federation cancelled the 2020 Norwegian Cup due to the COVID-19 pandemic in Norway.

On 30 September, the Minister of Culture and Gender Equality, Abid Raja, announced that clubs would be able to have crowds of 600 at games from 12 October.

== Squad ==
As of 25 September 2020

Note: Flags indicate national team as defined under FIFA eligibility rules; some limited exceptions apply. Players may hold more than one non-FIFA nationality.

No.	Pos.	Nation	Player
3	DF	NOR	Simen Kind Mikalsen
4	DF	NOR	Espen Bjørnsen Garnås
5	DF	NOR	Simen Rafn
6	MF	FIN	Kaan Kairinen (on loan from Midtjylland)
7	MF	NOR	Torbjørn Kallevåg
8	MF	NGR	Ifeanyi Mathew
10	FW	NOR	Thomas Lehne Olsen (Captain)
11	MF	NOR	Tobias Svendsen
12	GK	NOR	Mads Hedenstad Christiansen
14	MF	NOR	Fredrik Krogstad
16	FW	ISL	Björn Bergmann Sigurðarson
21	MF	NOR	Magnus Knudsen

No.	Pos.	Nation	Player
22	DF	NOR	Philip Slørdahl
23	DF	NOR	Marius Amundsen
24	DF	NOR	Erik Sandberg
25	GK	BEL	Jo Coppens
26	DF	NOR	Lars Ranger
27	FW	NOR	Alexander Sannes
28	MF	NOR	Apipon Tongnoy
33	MF	NOR	Aleksander Melgalvis
35	MF	NOR	Eskil Edh
40	GK	NOR	Jørgen Sveinhaug
88	FW	ISL	Arnór Smárason (vice-captain)
90	MF	SWE	Daniel Gustavsson

=== Players out on loan ===
Note: Flags indicate national team as defined under FIFA eligibility rules; some limited exceptions apply. Players may hold more than one non-FIFA nationality.

No.	Pos.	Nation	Player
15	DF	NOR	Josef Baccay (on loan at Fredrikstad until 31 December 2020)
16	MF	NGR	Charles Ezeh (on loan at Øygarden until 31 December 2020)
17	MF	NOR	Kristoffer Ødemarksbakken (on loan at Ull/Kisa until 31 December 2020)
29	GK	NOR	Emil Ødegaard (on loan at Grorud until 31 December 2020)

== Transfers ==
=== Winter ===
In: Note: Flags indicate national team as defined under FIFA eligibility rules; some limited exceptions apply. Players may hold more than one non-FIFA nationality.

No.	Pos.	Nation	Player
6	MF	FIN	Kaan Kairinen (on loan from (Denmark) FC Midtjylland)
25	GK	EST	Matvei Igonen (loan return from (Estonia) Flora Tallinn)
26	DF	NOR	Lars Ranger (loan return from (Norway) Ull/Kisa)
27	FW	NOR	Alexander Hrcka Sannes (promoted from junior squad)
28	MF	NOR	Apipon Tongnoy (promoted from junior squad)

Out: Note: Flags indicate national team as defined under FIFA eligibility rules; some limited exceptions apply. Players may hold more than one non-FIFA nationality.

No.	Pos.	Nation	Player
1	GK	CRO	Marko Marić (loan return to (Germany) 1899 Hoffenheim)
2	DF	NOR	Mats Haakenstad (to (Finland) KuPS)
6	DF	EST	Joonas Tamm (loan return to (Estonia) Flora)
13	DF	NOR	Frode Kippe (retired)
15	MF	NOR	Erik Næsbak Brenden (to (Norway) Sandefjord)
16	MF	NGR	Charles Ezeh (on loan to (Norway) Øygarden, previously on loan at (Norway) Skeid)
23	MF	DEN	Daniel A. Pedersen (to (Norway) Brann)

=== Summer ===
In: Note: Flags indicate national team as defined under FIFA eligibility rules; some limited exceptions apply. Players may hold more than one non-FIFA nationality.

No.	Pos.	Nation	Player
4	DF	NOR	Espen Garnås (from (Norway) Ull/Kisa)
7	MF	NOR	Torbjørn Kallevåg (from (Norway) Haugesund)
9	FW	ISL	Tryggvi Hrafn Haraldsson (from (Iceland) ÍA Akranes)
11	FW	NOR	Sindre Mauritz-Hansen (free transfer)
11	MF	NOR	Tobias Svendsen (from (Norway) HamKam)
16	FW	ISL	Björn Bergmann Sigurðarson (from (Russia) Rostov)
18	MF	NOR	Ulrik Mathisen (from (Norway) Kjelsås)
20	FW	NOR	Jonatan Braut Brunes (on loan from (Norway) Florø)
23	DF	NOR	Marius Amundsen (free transfer)
25	GK	BEL	Jo Coppens (from (Germany) Carl Zeiss Jena)

Out: Note: Flags indicate national team as defined under FIFA eligibility rules; some limited exceptions apply. Players may hold more than one non-FIFA nationality.

No.	Pos.	Nation	Player
1	GK	EST	Matvei Igonen (to (Estonia) Flora)
4	DF	DEN	Tobias Salquist (to (Denmark) Hobro)
11	FW	NOR	Sindre Mauritz-Hansen (to (Norway) Asker)
15	DF	NOR	Josef Baccay (on loan to (Norway) Fredrikstad)
17	FW	NOR	Kristoffer Ødemarksbakken (on loan to (Norway) Ull/Kisa)
19	DF	NOR	Sheriff Sinyan (to (Norway) Molde)
40	MF	NGR	Moses Ebiye (to (Norway) HamKam)

== Competitions ==
=== Friendlies ===
9 June 2020 Friendly	Lillestrøm (Norway)	1–1	(Norway) Kristiansund	Kjeller
13:15 CEST (UTC+2)		Report		Stadium: Åråsen Stadion

15 June 2020 Friendly	Lillestrøm (Norway)	3–0	(Norway) Jerv	Kjeller
16:00 CEST (UTC+2)		Report		Stadium: Åråsen Stadion

20 June 2020 Friendly	KFUM Oslo (Norway)	1–2	(Norway) Lillestrøm	Oslo
12:00 CEST (UTC+2)		Report		Stadium: KFUM Arena

26 June 2020 Friendly	Kongsvinger (Norway)	3–1	(Norway) Lillestrøm	Kongsvinger
14:00 CEST (UTC+2)		Report		Stadium: Gjemselund Stadion

=== 1. divisjon ===
==== Results summary ====
Overall								Home						Away					
Pld	W	D	L	GF	GA	GD	Pts	W	D	L	GF	GA	GD	W	D	L	GF	GA	GD
30	16	9	5	49	26	+23	57	9	4	2	27	12	+15	7	5	3	22	14	+8

Last updated: 13 December 2020.
Source: Soccerway

==== Results by round ====
Round	1	2	3	4	5	6	7	8	9	10	11	12	13	14	15	16	17	18	19	20	21	22	23	24	25	26	27	28	29	30
Ground	A	H	A	H	A	A	H	A	H	H	A	H	A	H	A	H	A	H	A	H	A	H	A	H	A	H	A	H	A	H
Result	W	W	D	L	L	D	L	W	D	D	W	W	D	W	W	W	W	W	W	W	D	W	L	W	W	D	L	W	D	D
Position	7	3	3	4	8	9	10	10	10	10	7	6	5	5	4	4	4	3	3	2	2	2	2	2	2	2	2	2	2	2

Updated to match(es) played on 13 December 2020. Source: see below
A = Away; H = Home; W = Win; D = Draw; L = Loss

==== Results ====
3 July 2020 1	Grorud	0–1	Lillestrøm	Oslo
18:00 CEST (UTC+2)	Cornic (yellow card) 4'; Murray (yellow card) 39'	Report	Lehne Olsen (yellow card) 27'; Kairinen (yellow card) 40'; Krogstad 66'; Kallevåg (yellow card) 87'	Stadium: Grorud Stadion; Attendance: 200; Referee: Svein Tore Sinnes

7 July 2020 2	Lillestrøm	2–0	HamKam	Lillestrøm
19:00 CEST (UTC+2)	Melgalvis 60'; Mathew (yellow card) 65'; Ebiye 84'	Report	Svendsen (yellow card) 55'	Stadium: Åråsen Stadion; Attendance: 200; Referee: Daniel Higraff

14 July 2020 3	Sandnes Ulf	1–1	Lillestrøm	Sandnes
19:00 CEST (UTC+2)	Grødem (yellow card) 35'; Eriksen 61' (yellow card) 89'	Report	Lehne Olsen (yellow card) 15'; Mathew (yellow card) 20'; Mikalsen (yellow card) 39' (goal) 72'	Stadium: Øster Hus Arena; Attendance: 200; Referee: Marius Lien

20 July 2020 4	Lillestrøm	0–1	Stjørdals-Blink	Lillestrøm
18:00 CEST (UTC+2)	Mathew (yellow card) 32'	Report	Kartum (yellow card) 25'; Lillebo 33'; Sandmæl (yellow card) 65'; Hestad (yellow card) 81'; Vinje (yellow card) 90'	Stadium: Åråsen Stadion; Attendance: 200; Referee: Steinar Hauge

27 July 2020 5	Åsane	3–1	Lillestrøm	Åsane
18:00 CEST (UTC+2)	K. Larsen 53'; Stava (yellow card) 55'; Melgalvis 75' (o.g.); Fredriksen 90+3'	Report	Kallevåg 2'	Stadium: Myrdal Stadion; Attendance: 200; Referee: Mischa Schaub Kellerhals

31 July 2020 6	Jerv	2–2	Lillestrøm	Grimstad
20:30 CEST (UTC+2)	Pibe 22' (yellow card) 90+5'; Knudsen 54'; Zernichow (yellow card) 79'	Report	Gustavsson 14'; Melgalvis 18'; Amundsen (yellow card) 60'	Stadium: J.J. Ugland Stadion; Attendance: 200; Referee: Svein Tore Sinnes

4 August 2020 7	Lillestrøm	0–2	Sogndal	Lillestrøm
19:00 CEST (UTC+2)	Kallevåg (yellow card) 81'	Report	Hoven 14'; Kupen 19'; Blårud (yellow card) 21'; Ogbu (yellow card) 27'; Mannsverk (yellow card) 49'; Totland (yellow card) 65'	Stadium: Åråsen Stadion; Attendance: 200; Referee: Marius Lien

11 August 2020 8	KFUM Oslo	1–2	Lillestrøm	Oslo
19:00 CEST (UTC+2)	Sanyang 16'; Svindland (yellow card) 45+2'; Tavakoli (yellow card) 51'	Report	Rafn (yellow card) 21' (goal) 63'; Gustavsson 41'; Melgalvis (yellow card) 45+1'	Stadium: KFUM Arena; Attendance: 200; Referee: Ajdin Medic

14 August 2020 9	Lillestrøm	2–2	Ull/Kisa	Lillestrøm
20:30 CEST (UTC+2)	Gustavsson 25'; Lehne Olsen 54'; Kairinen (yellow card) 75'	Report	Walstad 50'; Kristiansen (yellow card) 53'; Werni 64'; Jensen (yellow card) 88'	Stadium: Åråsen Stadion; Attendance: 200; Referee: Magnus Nicolai Koløy

17 August 2020 10	Lillestrøm	2–2	Raufoss	Lillestrøm
18:00 CEST (UTC+2)	Kallevåg 18' (pen.)Lehne Olsen 86'	Report	Alm 16' (pen.); Lauvli (red card) 52'; Simenstad 67' (yellow card) 83'	Stadium: Åråsen Stadion; Attendance: 200; Referee: Jan Morten Tennøy

24 August 2020 11	Kongsvinger	0–3	Lillestrøm	Kongsvinger
20:30 CEST (UTC+2)		Report	Lehne Olsen 22'; Slørdahl (yellow card) 38'; Melgalvis 42'; Rafn (yellow card) 53'; Gustavsson 68'	Stadium: Gjemselund Stadion; Attendance: 200; Referee: Steinar Hauge

27 August 2020 12	Lillestrøm	1–0	Strømmen	Lillestrøm
18:00 CEST (UTC+2)	Gustavsson 21'; Melgalvis (yellow card) 69'; Lehne Olsen (yellow card) 76'	Report	Nordås (yellow card) 14'; Kurucay (yellow card) 41'; Bjørlo (yellow card) 90'	Stadium: Åråsen Stadion; Attendance: 200; Referee: Ajdin Medic

30 August 2020 13	Øygarden	0–0	Lillestrøm	Ågotnes
15:00 CEST (UTC+2)	E. H. Larsen (yellow card) 22'	Report	Amundsen (yellow card) 68'	Stadium: Ågotnes Stadion; Attendance: 200; Referee: Harald Røvig Sletner

8 September 2020 14	Lillestrøm	3–1	Ranheim	Lillestrøm
18:00 CEST (UTC+2)	Ebiye 85'; Krogstad 90+1'; Lehne Olsen 90+4'	Report	Dønnem 42'; Blakstad (yellow card) 79'	Stadium: Åråsen Stadion; Attendance: 200; Referee: Svein Tore Sinnes

15 September 2020 15	Tromsø	0–1	Lillestrøm	Tromsø
19:00 CEST (UTC+2)	Sætra (yellow card) 84'; Ingebrigtsen (yellow card) 90+1'	Report	Kallevåg 15'; Garnås (yellow card) 38'; Amundsen (yellow card) 82'; Mathew (yellow card) 90+1'	Stadium: Alfheim Stadion; Attendance: 200; Referee: Tom Harald Hagen

21 September 2020 16	Lillestrøm	2–0	Kongsvinger	Lillestrøm
18:00 CEST (UTC+2)	Knudsen 84'; Sigurðarson 89'	Report	Steiring (yellow card) 33'; Skagestad (yellow card) 38'	Stadium: Åråsen Stadion; Attendance: 200; Referee: Marius Lien

25 September 2020 17	Strømmen	1–4	Lillestrøm	Strømmen
17:00 CEST (UTC+2)	Kurucay (yellow card) 31'; Renå Olsen (red card) 39'; Nordås (yellow card) 85'; Tvedte 90' (yellow card) 90+4'	Report	Kallevåg (yellow card) 25'; Krogstad 40' (pen.); Melgalvis (yellow card) 43'; Garnås 48'; Svendsen 74'; Lehne Olsen 81'	Stadium: Strømmen Stadion; Attendance: 200; Referee: Christian Moen

18 November 2020 18	Lillestrøm	1–0	Jerv	Lillestrøm
18:00 CEST (UTC+2)	Svendsen 8'; Mikalsen (yellow card) 57'	Report	Baidoo (yellow card) 45+2'; Solli (yellow card) 71'	Stadium: Åråsen Stadion; Attendance: 200; Referee: Daniel Higraff

3 October 2020 19	Stjørdals-Blink	1–4	Lillestrøm	Stjørdal
15:30 CEST (UTC+2)	Kartum (yellow card) 22'; Nyenetue 87'	Report	Garnås (yellow card) 19'; Melgalvis 23'; Kallevåg 48'; Lehne Olsen 54'; Kairinen 60' (pen.)	Stadium: M.U.S Stadion Sandskogan; Attendance: 200; Referee: Ole-Alexander Ekeli Valen

11 October 2020 20	Lillestrøm	3–0	Øygarden	Lillestrøm
15:30 CEST (UTC+2)	Lehne Olsen 45'; Kallevåg 45+2'; Krogstad 58' (pen.)	Report	Jablinski (yellow card) 73'	Stadium: Åråsen Stadion; Attendance: 200; Referee: Mischa Kellerhals

18 October 2020 21	Ranheim	1–1	Lillestrøm	Ranheim
15:00 CEST (UTC+2)	Reginiussen (yellow card) 87'; Sørløkk 90+2'	Report	Mathew (yellow card) 14'; Gustavsson (yellow card) 56' (goal) 64'; Kallevåg (yellow card) 59'; Svendsen (yellow card) 81'	Stadium: EXTRA Arena; Attendance: 600; Referee: Ajdin Medic

25 October 2020 22	Lillestrøm	4–2	Sandnes Ulf	Lillestrøm
15:00 CET (UTC+1)	Krogstad 13'; Haraldsson 25'; Kairinen 26'; Lehne Olsen 47'; Slørdahl (yellow card) 73'	Report	Eriksen 16'; Landu 69'	Stadium: Åråsen Stadion; Attendance: 200; Referee: Harald Røvig Sletner

28 October 2020 23	Raufoss	2–0	Lillestrøm	Raufoss
18:00 CET (UTC+1)	Doghman 20'; Brattbakk (yellow card) 89'; Alm 90+4' (pen.)	Report	Amundsen (yellow card) 90+4'	Stadium: Nammo Stadion; Attendance: 600; Referee: Stian Røvig Sletner

1 November 2020 24	Lillestrøm	3–0	Tromsø	Lillestrøm
15:00 CET (UTC+1)	Krogstad 8', 14' (pen.); Garnås (yellow card) 43'; Kairinen (yellow card) 45'; Haraldsson 48'; Rafn (yellow card) 88'	Report	Sætra (yellow card) 13'	Stadium: Åråsen Stadion; Attendance: 200; Referee: Svein Tore Sinnes

4 November 2020 25	Sogndal	0–1	Lillestrøm	Sogndalsfjøra
20:00 CET (UTC+1)	Ogbu (yellow card) 31'; Kupen (yellow card) 32'; Blårud (yellow card) 83'	Report	Kairinen 7'; Krogstad (yellow card) 31'; Hedenstad (yellow card) 76'; Knudsen (yellow card) 89'	Stadium: Fosshaugane Campus; Attendance: 600; Referee: Steinar Hauge

8 November 2020 26	Lillestrøm	1–1	Åsane	Lillestrøm
15:00 CET (UTC+1)	Haraldsson 8'; Gustavsson (yellow card) 36'	Report	Ueland (yellow card) 41'; Lassen 86'; Kvile (yellow card) 90+2'	Stadium: Åråsen Stadion; Attendance: 200; Referee: Mischa Kellerhals

15 November 2020 27	Ull/Kisa	1–0	Lillestrøm	Jessheim
18:00 CET (UTC+1)	Jenssen 51' (yellow card) 66'; Berge (yellow card) 90+4'	Report		Stadium: Jessheim Stadion; Attendance: 400; Referee: Magnus Nicolai Koløy

2 December 2020 28	Lillestrøm	2–0	KFUM Oslo	Lillestrøm
18:00 CET (UTC+1)	Lehne Olsen 44'; Kairinen 53' (yellow card) 82'	Report	Gueye (yellow card) 84'; Sortevik (yellow card) 84'	Stadium: Åråsen Stadion; Attendance: 200; Referee: Marius Lien

6 December 2020 29	HamKam	1–1	Lillestrøm	Hamar
15:00 CET (UTC+1)	Eriksen 23'	Report	Haraldsson 82'	Stadium: Briskeby Stadion; Attendance: 600; Referee: Svein Tore Sinnes

13 December 2020 30	Lillestrøm	1–1	Grorud	Lillestrøm
13:00 CET (UTC+1)	Garnås (yellow card) 21'; Slørdahl (yellow card) 69' (goal) 90+4'; Rafn (yellow card) 81'	Report	Meyer (yellow card) 7'; Høyland (yellow card) 19'; Mankowitz (yellow card) 69'; Aga 80' (pen.)	Stadium: Åråsen Stadion; Attendance: 200; Referee: Ole-Alexander Ekeli Valen

==== Table ====
Pos	Team	Pld	W	D	L	GF	GA	GD	Pts	Promotion, qualification or relegation
1	Tromsø (C, P)	30	19	6	5	60	29	+31	63	Promotion to Eliteserien
2	Lillestrøm (P)	30	16	9	5	49	26	+23	57	Promotion to Eliteserien
3	Sogndal	30	15	6	9	57	36	+21	51	Qualification for the promotion play-offs
4	Ranheim	30	13	8	9	61	41	+20	47	Qualification for the promotion play-offs
5	Åsane	30	12	9	9	60	48	+12	45	Qualification for the promotion play-offs

Source: NFF, Soccerway
Rules for classification: 1) Points; 2) Goal difference; 3) Goals scored; 4) Head-to-head points; 5) Head-to-head goal difference; 6) Head-to-head away goals scored (only if between two teams); 7) Head-to-head goals scored; 8) Play-off (only used to decide champions or relegation).
(C) Champions; (P) Promoted

=== Norwegian Cup ===
2020 First Round	–
CEST (UTC+2)
Note: Cup cancelled on 10 September due to the COVID-19 pandemic in Norway.
