= Espen Garnås =

Norwegian footballer (born 1994)

Personal information
- Full name: Espen Bjørnsen Garnås
- Date of birth: 31 December 1994 (age 31)
- Position: Defender

Team information
- Current team: Lillestrøm
- Number: 4

Youth career
- –2009: Nesbyen
- 2010: Hallingdal
- 2013–2014: Mjøndalen

Senior career*
Years	Team	Apps	(Gls)
2011–2013	Hallingdal	52	(5)
2014–2017	Kjelsås	57	(9)
2017–2020	Ull/Kisa	62	(11)
2020–	Lillestrøm	147	(12)
- * Club domestic league appearances and goals as of 23 July 2026

Espen Garnås (born 31 December 1994) is a Norwegian football defender who plays as a central defender for Lillestrøm.

== Career statistics ==
As of 24 November 2024

Appearances and goals by club, season and competition
Club	Season	League			National cup		Other		Total	
Club	Season	Division	Apps	Goals	Apps	Goals	Apps	Goals	Apps	Goals
Hallingdal	2011	4. divisjon	11	3	0	0	—		11	3
Hallingdal	2012	4. divisjon	28	1	0	0	—		28	1
Hallingdal	2013	4. divisjon	13	1	3	0	—		16	1
Hallingdal	Total		52	5	3	0	—		55	5
Kjelsås	2014	2. divisjon	1	0	0	0	—		1	0
Kjelsås	2015	2. divisjon	17	3	1	0	—		18	3
Kjelsås	2016	2. divisjon	24	4	2	1	—		26	5
Kjelsås	2017	2. divisjon	15	2	2	0	—		17	2
Kjelsås	Total		57	9	5	1	—		62	10
Ull/Kisa	2017	1. divisjon	7	0	0	0	1 (Note: Appearances in Eliteserien play-offs)	0	8	0
Ull/Kisa	2018	1. divisjon	19	3	3	0	1	0	23	3
Ull/Kisa	2019	1. divisjon	24	3	3	0	—		27	3
Ull/Kisa	2020	1. divisjon	12	5	0	0	—		12	5
Ull/Kisa	Total		62	11	6	0	2	0	70	11
Lillestrøm	2020	1. divisjon	16	1	—		—		16	1
Lillestrøm	2021	Eliteserien	27	2	3	1	—		30	3
Lillestrøm	2022	Eliteserien	28	2	4	0	4 (Note: Appearances in UEFA Europa Conference League)	0	36	2
Lillestrøm	2023	Eliteserien	27	3	6	0	—		33	3
Lillestrøm	2024	Eliteserien	21	3	4	0	—		25	3
Lillestrøm	Total		119	11	17	1	4	0	140	12
Career total			290	36	31	2	6	0	327	38
