= Tobias Svendsen =

Norwegian football player (born 1999)

Personal information
- Full name: Tobias Hammer Svendsen
- Date of birth: 31 August 1999 (age 27)
- Place of birth: Molde, Norway
- Height: 1.74 m (5 ft 9 in)
- Position: Midfielder

Team information
- Current team: Kristiansund
- Number: 23

Youth career
- –2017: Molde

Senior career*
Years	Team	Apps	(Gls)
2015–2020	Molde	17	(1)
2018	→ Haugesund (loan)	8	(0)
2019	→ Sandefjord (loan)	6	(0)
2019	→ Nest-Sotra (loan)	9	(1)
2020	HamKam	14	(5)
2020–2023	Lillestrøm	64	(2)
2023–2025	Odd	57	(7)
2026–	Kristiansund	12	(1)

International career^{‡}
2014	Norway U15	5	(0)
2015	Norway U16	15	(0)
2016	Norway U17	6	(0)
2016–2017	Norway U18	10	(2)
2017–2018	Norway U19	10	(0)
2019	Norway U20	4	(0)
2018	Norway U21	1	(0)
- * Club domestic league appearances and goals as of 2 August 2026 ‡ National team caps and goals as of 27 May 2019

Tobias Hammer Svendsen (born 31 August 1999) is a Norwegian footballer who plays as a midfielder for Eliteserien club Kristiansund.

== Club career ==
Svendsen made his league debut on 9 July 2016 in a match against Sogndal, which Molde lost 4–3.

Svendsen was loaned out to Sandefjord on 16 January 2019 for the whole season. The loan was terminated in July 2019, and Svendsen returned to Molde. On 9 September 2019, Molde announced that Svendsen would be loaned out to Nest-Sotra for the rest of the 2019 season.

== Personal life ==
He is a younger brother of Sander Svendsen.

== Career statistics ==
As of 2 August 2026

Appearances and goals by club, season and competition
Club	Season	League			National Cup		Continental		Total	
Club	Season	Division	Apps	Goals	Apps	Goals	Apps	Goals	Apps	Goals
Molde	2015	Eliteserien	0	0	1	0	0	0	1	0
Molde	2016	Eliteserien	4	1	1	0	0	0	5	1
Molde	2017	Eliteserien	6	0	2	0	—		8	0
Molde	2018	Eliteserien	7	0	2	0	1 (Note: Appearance in UEFA Europa League)	0	10	0
Molde	Total		17	1	6	0	1	0	24	1
Haugesund (loan)	2018	Eliteserien	8	0	0	0	—		8	0
Sandefjord (loan)	2019	1. divisjon	6	0	0	0	—		6	0
Nest-Sotra (loan)	2019	1. divisjon	9	1	0	0	—		9	1
HamKam	2020	1. divisjon	14	5	—		—		14	5
Lillestrøm	2020	1. divisjon	12	2	—		—		12	2
Lillestrøm	2021	Eliteserien	21	0	2	1	—		23	1
Lillestrøm	2022	Eliteserien	14	0	4	0	3 (Note: Appearances in UEFA Conference League)	0	21	0
Lillestrøm	2023	Eliteserien	17	0	6	3	—		23	3
Lillestrøm	Total		64	2	12	4	3	0	79	6
Odd	2023	Eliteserien	10	1	0	0	—		10	1
Odd	2024	Eliteserien	27	3	2	0	—		29	3
Odd	2025	1. divisjon	20	3	1	0	—		21	3
Odd	Total		57	7	3	0	—		60	7
Kristiansund	2026	Eliteserien	12	1	0	0	—		12	1
Career total			187	17	21	4	4	0	212	21
