= Ulrik Mathisen =

Norwegian footballer (born 1999)

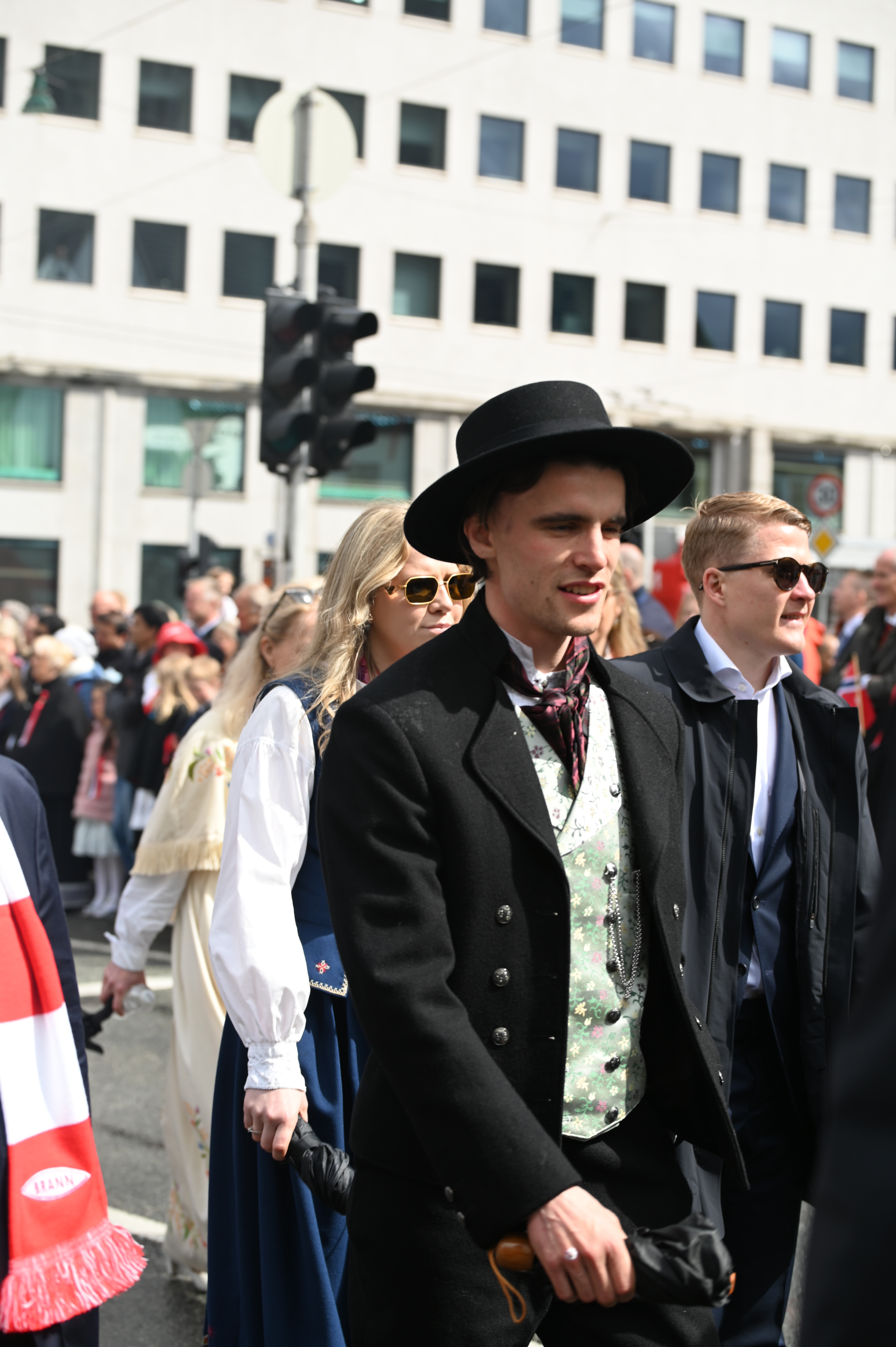

Personal information
- Date of birth: 15 January 1999 (age 27)
- Place of birth: Oslo, Norway
- Height: 1.85 m (6 ft 1 in)
- Positions: Right winger; attacking midfielder

Team information
- Current team: Brann
- Number: 14

Youth career
- –2014: Skeid
- 2015–2018: Vålerenga

Senior career*
Years	Team	Apps	(Gls)
2019–2020	Kjelsås	38	(1)
2020–2023	Lillestrøm	30	(1)
2022	→ Sogndal (loan)	27	(2)
2023–	Brann	85	(6)

International career^{‡}
2014	Norway U15	1	(0)
2016	Norway U17	3	(0)
- * Club domestic league appearances and goals as of 13 September 2026 ‡ National team caps and goals as of 5 August 2024

Ulrik Mathisen (born 15 January 1999) is a Norwegian footballer who plays as right winger for the Eliteserien club Brann.

Mathisen played youth football for Skeid and Vålerenga. He was not given a chance for Vålerenga's senior team, and was "almost thrown out" of the club. He therefore started his senior career in Kjelsås. Playing on the third tier, he had to do something on the side and studied at Oslo Metropolitan University. He joined Lillestrøm from Kjelsås in 2020, taking steps to become a full-time footballer. He helped win promotion from the 2020 1. divisjon. Later, Mathisen stated that his development was delayed by growing pains.

Despite playing 21 Eliteserien matches in 2021, Lillestrøm did not need the player in 2022 and loaned him out to Sogndal. Ahead of the 2023 season he was signed by SK Brann. One of his notable moments in Brann was scoring against Lillestrøm in 2023. He was briefly hospitalized in April 2024 following an on-pitch accident, missing several matches due to a concussion.

== Career statistics ==
As of 16 September 2026

Appearances and goals by club, season and competition
Club	Season	League			National cup		Europe		Total	
Club	Season	Division	Apps	Goals	Apps	Goals	Apps	Goals	Apps	Goals
Kjelsås	2019	2. divisjon	25	1	2	0	—		27	1
Kjelsås	2020	2. divisjon	13	0	—		—		13	0
Kjelsås	Total		38	1	2	0	—		40	1
Lillestrøm	2020	1. divisjon	9	0	—		—		9	0
Lillestrøm	2021	Eliteserien	21	1	2	0	—		23	1
Lillestrøm	2022	Eliteserien	0	0	2	0	—		2	0
Lillestrøm	Total		30	1	4	0	—		34	1
Sogndal (loan)	2022	1. divisjon	27	2	2	0	—		29	2
Brann	2023	Eliteserien	19	2	4	0	4 (Note: Appearances in the UEFA Conference League)	0	27	2
Brann	2024	Eliteserien	21	1	1	0	4	0	26	1
Brann	2025	Eliteserien	26	2	1	0	11 (Note: Two appearances in the UEFA Champions League, eight appearances in the UEFA Europa League)	0	37	2
Brann	2026	Eliteserien	18	1	4	1	7 (Note: Four appearances in UEFA Europa League, three appearances in UEFA Conference League)	0	29	2
Brann	Total		85	6	10	1	25	0	119	7
Career total			178	10	18	1	25	0	223	11
