= Kaan Kairinen =

Finnish footballer (born 1998)

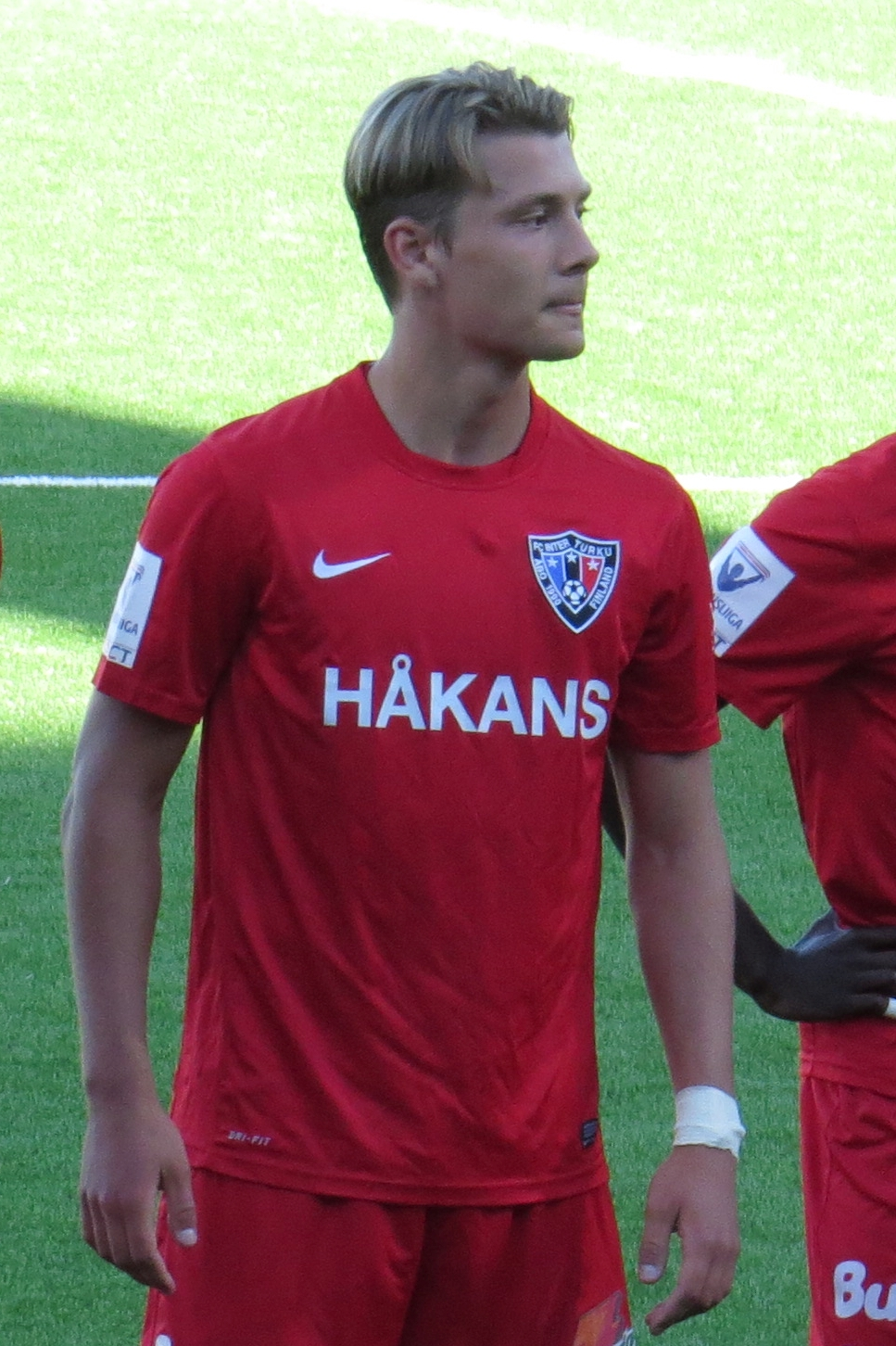
- Kairinen with Inter Turku in 2015

Personal information
- Full name: Kasper Kaan Kairinen
- Date of birth: 22 December 1998 (age 27)
- Place of birth: Turku, Finland
- Height: 1.86 m (6 ft 1 in)
- Position: Central midfielder

Team information
- Current team: AEK Athens
- Number: 6

Youth career
- TuNL
- –2015: Inter Turku
- 2016–2018: Midtjylland

Senior career*
Years	Team	Apps	(Gls)
2014–2016	Inter Turku	27	(0)
2016–2020	Midtjylland	5	(0)
2017	→ Skive IK (loan)	6	(0)
2018	→ Inter Turku (loan)	6	(0)
2019	→ HJK (loan)	24	(2)
2020	→ Lillestrøm (loan)	28	(4)
2021–2022	Lillestrøm	42	(2)
2023–2026	Sparta Prague	103	(4)
2026–	AEK Athens	2	(0)

International career^{‡}
2014–2015	Finland U17	10	(0)
2015–2016	Finland U19	7	(0)
2017–2020	Finland U21	19	(4)
2019–	Finland	31	(1)
- * Club domestic league appearances and goals as of 30 August 2026 ‡ National team caps and goals as of 3 October 2026

Kasper Kaan Kairinen (born 22 December 1998) is a Finnish professional footballer who plays as a central midfielder for Greek Super League club AEK Athens and the Finland national team.

== Early life ==
Kasper Kaan Kairinen was born to a Turkish father and a Finnish mother in Turku, and was raised in Runosmäki neighbourhood.

== Club career ==
=== Inter Turku ===
Kairinen is a youth exponent from Inter Turku. He made his Veikkausliiga debut at 25 October 2014 against FF Jaro, coming on as a substitute for Kalle Kauppi after 70 minutes in a 1–0 home defeat. Kairinen became the second-youngest player in Inter Turku's history to play for the club, since he made his debut at the age of 15.

In October 2015, Kairinen was named among the top 50 best young talents in world football by The Guardian. He also spent time with Juventus on trial and was offered a contract.

=== Midtjylland and loans ===
On 1 February 2016, it was confirmed by FC Midtjylland, that they had signed with Kairinen for an undisclosed fee.

On 14 November 2018, Midtjylland announced that Kairinen would spend 2019 at HJK Helsinki on a loan deal.

=== Lillestrøm ===
Kairinen had a successful loan spell with Lillestrøm in Norway in the 2020 season, after which the club gained a promotion to Eliteserien. After the season, Kairinen transferred to Lillestrøm on a permanent contract, signing a four-year deal, for a transfer fee of €300,000. In late 2021, he suffered from a long-lasted foot injury, which was eventually operated in January 2022 by surgeon Lasse Lempainen in Turku, Finland.

=== Sparta Prague ===
==== 2022–23 season ====
On 20 December 2022, it was confirmed by Sparta Prague, that they had signed with Kairinen on a deal until 30 June 2026, for a reported fee of €1.5 million. Kairinen scored a goal and provided an assist in his debut in Czech First League on 5 February 2023, in a 4–1 home win against Mladá Boleslav. During his first season in Prague, he helped the club to win their first Czech championship title since 2014.

==== 2023–24 season ====
On 16 March 2024, Kairinen extended his contract with Sparta until 30 June 2028. Kairinen recorded 12 appearances and provided four assists in Sparta's 2023–24 UEFA Europa League campaign, helping his side to advance to the round of 16, where they were eventually defeated by Liverpool.

On 18 May 2024, after an away win against Mladá Boleslav, Kairinen and Sparta secured their second Czech First League championship title in a row. On 22 May 2024, Kairinen and Sparta were crowned the 2023–24 Czech Cup champions after beating Viktoria Plzeň 2–1 in the final, completing Sparta's first double since 2014.

==== 2024–25 season ====
He missed the start of the 2024–25 season due to a leg injury he suffered in May, and returned to the line-up in the end of July 2024, in a win against FK Teplice. One month later, Kairinen and Sparta qualified for the 2024–25 UEFA Champions League after defeating Malmö FF 4–0 on aggregate in the qualifying play-off round, making it the club's first appearance in the UCL final competition in 19 years.

On 18 September, he scored in his debut in the UCL league phase, an opening goal in a 3–0 home win against RB Salzburg, becoming the 13th Finnish player to score in the Champions League. On 1 October, Kairinen scored again in his second UCL match, an equalizer from a free-kick past Alexander Nübel, in a 1–1 away draw against VfB Stuttgart. After the goal, his player profile in Transfermarkt was temporarily among the most popular profiles in the website.

=== AEK Athens ===
On 7 July 2026, Kairinen signed a four-year contract with Greek Super League club AEK Athens.

== International career ==
A former regular youth international, Kairinen debuted for the Finland senior national team on 8 January 2019 in a friendly match against Sweden, as a substitute for Rasmus Schüller in the 54th minute.

Kairinen scored his first goal for the Finland national team on 24 March 2025, in a 2026 FIFA World Cup qualification match against Lithuania.

== Personal life ==
Kairinen has two siblings; an older brother and a younger sister. Karinen's father died when he was five. He has openly discussed the eating disorder and depression he suffered during his time with Midtjylland, which almost ended his career prematurely.

== Career statistics ==
=== Club ===
As of match played 15 May 2026

Appearances and goals by club, season and competition
Club	Season	League			National cup (Note: Includes Finnish Cup, Norwegian Football Cup, Czech Cup)		League cup (Note: Includes Finnish League Cup)		Europe		Total	
Club	Season	Division	Apps	Goals	Apps	Goals	Apps	Goals	Apps	Goals	Apps	Goals
Inter Turku	2014	Veikkausliiga	1	0	0	0	0	0	—		1	0
Inter Turku	2015	Veikkausliiga	25	0	3	0	4	0	—		32	0
Inter Turku	2016	Veikkausliiga	0	0	0	0	1	0	—		1	0
Inter Turku	Total		26	0	3	0	5	0	—		34	0
Midtjylland	2016–17	Danish Superliga	2	0	0	0	—		0	0	2	0
Midtjylland	2017–18	Danish Superliga	3	0	0	0	—		0	0	3	0
Midtjylland	Total		5	0	0	0	—		0	0	5	0
Skive IK (loan)	2017	Danish 1st Division	6	0	0	0	—		—		6	0
Inter Turku (loan)	2018	Veikkausliiga	6	0	0	0	—		—		6	0
HJK (loan)	2019	Veikkausliiga	24	2	5	1	—		6 (Note: Four appearances in UEFA Champions League, two appearances in UEFA Europa League)	0	35	3
Lillestrøm (loan)	2020	Norwegian First Division	28	4	0	0	—		—		28	4
Lillestrøm	2021	Eliteserien	20	1	1	0	—		—		21	1
Lillestrøm	2022	Eliteserien	22	1	2	0	—		4 (Note: Appearances in UEFA Conference League)	0	28	1
Lillestrøm	Total		42	2	3	0	0	0	4	0	49	2
Sparta Prague	2022–23	Czech First League	15	1	3	0	—		—		18	1
Sparta Prague	2023–24	Czech First League	28	2	2	0	—		14 (Note: Two appearances in UEFA Champions League, twelve appearances in UEFA Europa League)	0	44	2
Sparta Prague	2024–25	Czech First League	28	0	5	0	—		12 (Note: Appearances UEFA Champions League)	2	45	2
Sparta Prague	2025–26	Czech First League	31	1	1	0	—		11	1	43	2
Sparta Prague	Total		102	4	11	0	0	0	37	3	150	7
AEK Athens	2026–27	Super League Greece	0	0	0	0	—		0	0	0	0
Career total			239	12	22	1	5	0	47	3	313	16

=== International ===
As of match played on 3 October 2026

National team	Year	Competitive		Friendly		Total	
National team	Year	Apps	Goals	Apps	Goals	Apps	Goals
Finland	2019	0	0	2	0	2	0
Finland	2020	0	0	0	0	0	0
Finland	2021	2 (Note: Appearances in the 2022 FIFA World Cup qualification.)	0	1	0	3	0
Finland	2022	2 (Note: Appearances in the 2022–23 UEFA Nations League B.)	0	0	0	2	0
Finland	2023	8 (Note: Appearances in the UEFA Euro 2024 qualification.)	0	0	0	8	0
Finland	2024	3 (Note: Appearances in the UEFA Euro 2024 qualification play-offs and 2024–25 UEFA Nations League B.)	0	1	0	4	0
Finland	2025	8 (Note: Appearances in the 2026 FIFA World Cup qualification.)	1	1	0	9	1
Finland	2026	3 (Note: Appearances in the 2026–27 UEFA Nations League C.)	0	0	0	3	0
Total		26	1	5	0	31	1

As of match played 24 March 2025
Scores and results list Finland's goal tally first, score column indicates score after each Kairinen goal.

List of international goals scored by Kaan Kairinen
No.	Date	Venue	Cap	Opponent	Score	Result	Competition
1	24 March 2025	Darius and Girėnas Stadium, Kaunas, Lithuania	1	Lithuania	1–0	2–2	2026 FIFA World Cup qualification

== Honours ==
Midtjylland

- Danish Superliga: 2017–18

Sparta Prague

- Czech First League: 2022–23, 2023–24
- Czech Cup: 2023–24; runner-up: 2022–23, 2024–25

Individual

- Veikkausliiga Breakthrough of the Year: 2015
- Finnish FA U21 Player of the Year: 2017
- Norwegian First Division Player of the Month: October 2020
