= Magnus Knudsen =

Norwegian footballer (born 2001)

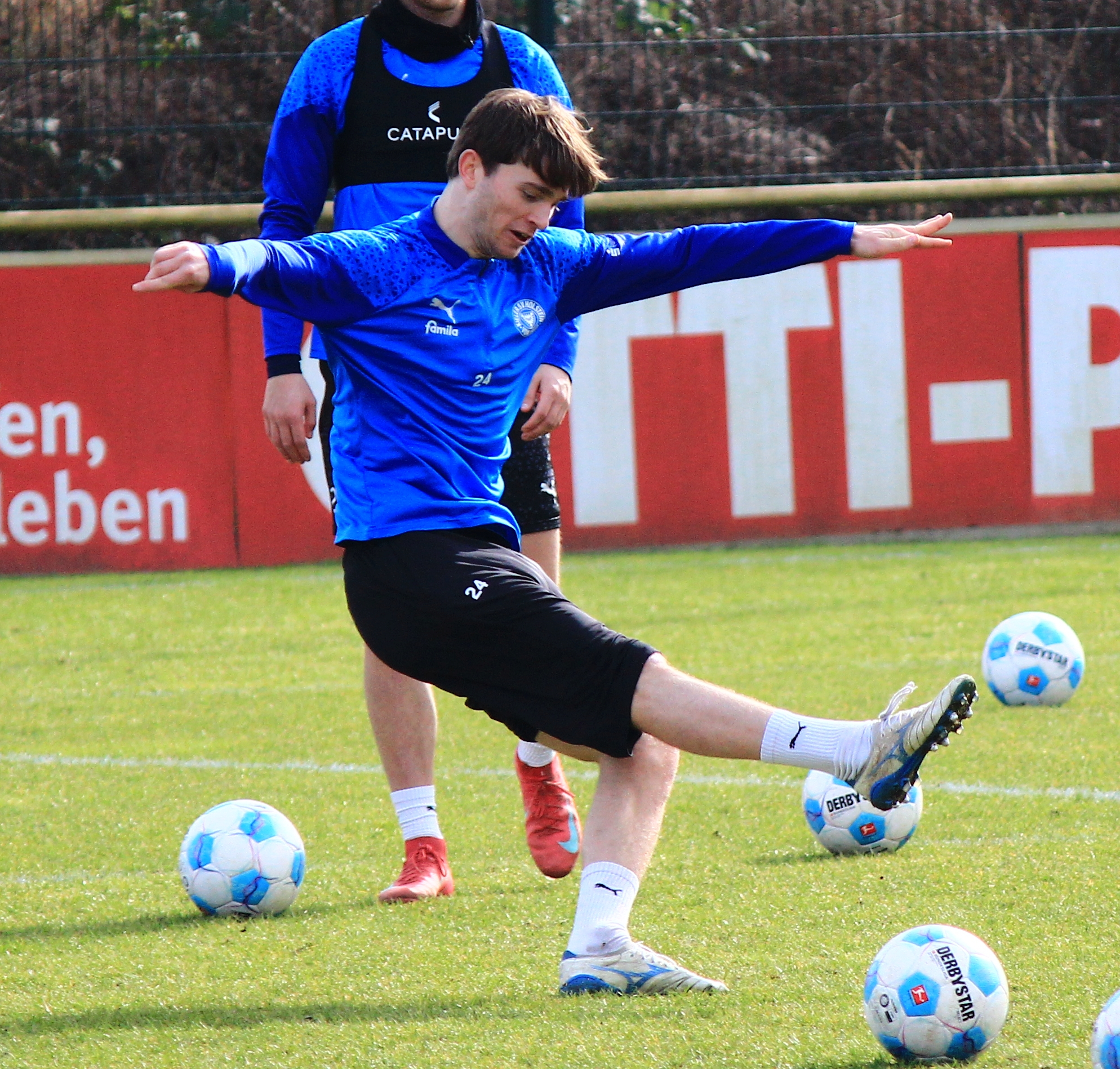
- Knudsen with Holstein Kiel in 2025

Personal information
- Full name: Magnus Nordengen Knudsen
- Date of birth: 15 June 2001 (age 25)
- Place of birth: Oslo, Norway
- Height: 1.86 m (6 ft 1 in)
- Position: Midfielder

Team information
- Current team: AGF
- Number: 4

Senior career*
Years	Team	Apps	(Gls)
2019–2022	Lillestrøm	45	(1)
2021	→ Ull/Kisa (loan)	11	(0)
2022–2024	Rostov	1	(0)
2022–2023	→ Lillestrøm (loan)	37	(3)
2023–2024	→ AGF (loan)	27	(3)
2024–2026	Holstein Kiel	48	(0)
2026–	AGF	13	(0)

International career
2019	Norway U18	3	(0)
2021	Norway U19	2	(0)
2021–2022	Norway U20	5	(0)
- * Club domestic league appearances and goals as of 16:55, 11 May 2026 (UTC)

Magnus Nordengen Knudsen (born 15 June 2001) is a Norwegian professional footballer who plays as a midfielder for Danish Superliga club AGF.

== Career ==
On 23 December 2021, Rostov announced the signing of Knudsen from Lillestrøm with a 4.5-year contract. On 24 March 2022, he returned to Lillestrøm on loan until 30 June 2022. On 7 July 2022, the loan was extended until 30 June 2023.

On 29 June 2023, Knudsen moved to AGF in Denmark on a one-year deal.

On 14 June 2024, he signed a contract with Holstein Kiel in Germany.

On 26 January 2026, Knudsen returned to AGF and signed a four-and-a-half-year contract. AGF was surprisingly leading the Danish Superliga at the time, and later went on to win the title.

== Career statistics ==
As of match played 17 May 2025

Appearances and goals by club, season and competition
Club	Season	League			National cup (Note: Includes Norwegian Football Cup, Danish Cup)		Europe		Total	
Club	Season	Division	Apps	Goals	Apps	Goals	Apps	Goals	Apps	Goals
Lillestrøm	2019	Eliteserien	1	0	0	0	—		1	0
Lillestrøm	2020	Norwegian First Division	25	1	—		—		25	1
Lillestrøm	2021	Eliteserien	19	0	1	0	—		20	0
Lillestrøm	Total		45	1	1	0	—		46	1
Ull/Kisa (loan)	2021	Norwegian First Division	11	0	—		—		11	0
Rostov	2021–22	Russian Premier League	1	0	—		—		1	0
Lillestrøm (loan)	2022	Eliteserien	27	3	5	0	4 (Note: Appearances in UEFA Europa Conference League)	1	36	4
Lillestrøm (loan)	2023	Eliteserien	10	0	0	0	—		10	0
Lillestrøm (loan)	Total		37	3	5	0	4	1	46	4
AGF	2023–24	Danish Superliga	27	3	7	0	2	0	36	3
Holstein Kiel	2024–25	Bundesliga	31	0	2	0	—		33	0
Career total			152	7	15	0	6	1	173	8

== Honours ==
AGF

- Danish Superliga: 2025–26
