= Thomas Lehne Olsen =

Norwegian footballer (born 1991)

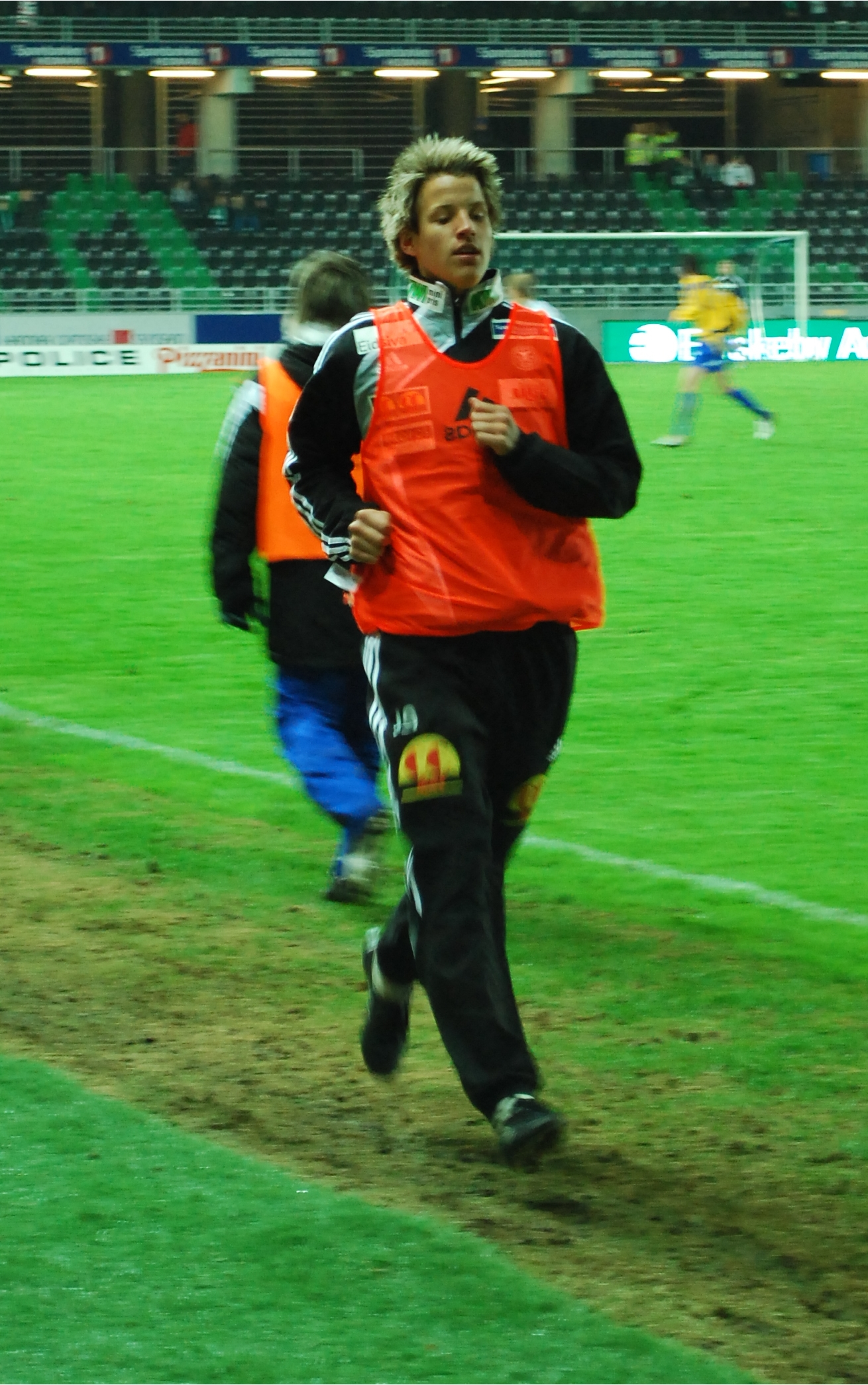
- Lehne Olsen in 2009

Personal information
- Full name: Thomas Lehne Olsen
- Date of birth: 29 June 1991 (age 35)
- Place of birth: Moelv, Norway
- Height: 1.86 m (6 ft 1 in)
- Position: Striker

Team information
- Current team: Lillestrøm
- Number: 10

Youth career
- –2008: Moelven

Senior career*
| Years | Team | Apps | (Gls) |
| 2007–2008 | Moelven | | |
| 2009–2012 | HamKam | 103 | (51) |
| 2013–2015 | Strømsgodset | 15 | (1) |
| 2013–2015 | Strømsgodset 2 | 30 | (27) |
| 2014 | → Ull/Kisa (loan) | 12 | (5) |
| 2016–2018 | Tromsø | 58 | (19) |
| 2018–2021 | Lillestrøm | 113 | (55) |
| 2021–2022 | Shabab Al Ahli | 11 | (5) |
| 2022– | Lillestrøm | 103 | (53) |

International career^{‡}
| 2009 | Norway U18 | 5 | (2) |
| 2010 | Norway U19 | 8 | (2) |
| 2011 | Norway U21 | 1 | (0) |
| 2021 | Norway | 1 | (0) |
- * Club domestic league appearances and goals as of 12 September 2026 ‡ National team caps and goals as of 16 November 2021

Thomas Lehne Olsen (born 29 June 1991) is a Norwegian professional footballer who plays as a striker for Eliteserien club Lillestrøm.

== Club career ==
Lehne Olsen made his debut for HamKam on 14 April 2009 against Alta, they won the game 7–0. He made his debut for Strømsgodset on 24 May 2013 against Aalesund, they won the game 2–1.

On 6 August 2014, he struck a loan deal with Ull/Kisa for the remainder of the 2014 season.

In December 2015, Lehne Olsen signed a contract with Tromsø. After two seasons at Tromsø, he signed a four-year contract with Lillestrøm on 12 February 2018.

In 2025, he helped Lillestrøm secure promotion to the Eliteserien at the first attempt. He scored 20 goals in 24 matches in the OBOS-ligaen and was a key figure in Lillestrøm’s successful season, during which they went unbeaten throughout the entire 2025 calendar year and capped it off by winning the Norwegian Cup on 6 December 2025.

== International career ==
He made his debut for Norway national football team on 16 November 2021 in a World Cup qualifier against the Netherlands.

== Career statistics ==
=== Club ===
As of match played on 17 September 2026

Appearances and goals by club, season and competition
| Club | Season | League | | | National Cup (Note: Includes Norwegian Cup) | | League Cup (Note: Includes UAE League Cup) | | Continental | | Other | | Total | |
| Club | Season | Division | Apps | Goals | Apps | Goals | Apps | Goals | Apps | Goals | Apps | Goals | Apps | Goals |
|---|---|---|---|---|---|---|---|---|---|---|---|---|---|---|
| HamKam | 2009 | 1. divisjon | 25 | 5 | 1 | 3 | — | | — | | — | | 26 | 8 |
| HamKam | 2010 | 2. divisjon | 26 | 27 | 0 | 0 | — | | — | | — | | 26 | 27 |
| HamKam | 2011 | 1. divisjon | 22 | 8 | 2 | 1 | — | | — | | — | | 24 | 9 |
| HamKam | 2012 | 1. divisjon | 30 | 11 | 3 | 2 | — | | — | | — | | 33 | 13 |
| HamKam | Total | | 103 | 51 | 6 | 6 | — | | — | | — | | 109 | 57 |
| Strømsgodset | 2013 | Eliteserien | 4 | 0 | 0 | 0 | — | | 1 (Note: Appearance(s) in UEFA Europa League) | 0 | — | | 5 | 0 |
| Strømsgodset | 2014 | Eliteserien | 4 | 0 | 3 | 5 | — | | 0 | 0 | — | | 7 | 5 |
| Strømsgodset | 2015 | Eliteserien | 7 | 1 | 2 | 1 | — | | 4 | 0 | — | | 13 | 2 |
| Strømsgodset | Total | | 15 | 1 | 5 | 6 | — | | 5 | 0 | — | | 25 | 7 |
| Strømsgodset 2 | 2013 | 2. divisjon | 12 | 10 | — | | — | | — | | — | | 12 | 10 |
| Strømsgodset 2 | 2014 | 2. divisjon | 8 | 7 | — | | — | | — | | — | | 8 | 7 |
| Strømsgodset 2 | 2015 | 2. divisjon | 10 | 10 | — | | — | | — | | — | | 10 | 10 |
| Strømsgodset 2 | Total | | 30 | 27 | — | | — | | — | | — | | 30 | 27 |
| Ull/Kisa (loan) | 2014 | 1. divisjon | 12 | 5 | 0 | 0 | — | | — | | — | | 12 | 5 |
| Tromsø | 2016 | Eliteserien | 30 | 8 | 5 | 5 | — | | — | | — | | 35 | 13 |
| Tromsø | 2017 | Eliteserien | 28 | 11 | 3 | 1 | — | | — | | — | | 31 | 12 |
| Tromsø | Total | | 58 | 19 | 8 | 6 | — | | — | | — | | 66 | 25 |
| Lillestrøm | 2018 | Eliteserien | 29 | 12 | 5 | 4 | — | | 2 | 1 | 1 (Note: Appearance in Mesterfinalen) | 0 | 37 | 17 |
| Lillestrøm | 2019 | Eliteserien | 26 | 8 | 2 | 2 | — | | — | | 2 (Note: Appearances in Eliteserien play-offs) | 0 | 30 | 10 |
| Lillestrøm | 2020 | 1. divisjon | 30 | 9 | — | | — | | — | | — | | 30 | 9 |
| Lillestrøm | 2021 | Eliteserien | 28 | 26 | 2 | 2 | — | | — | | — | | 30 | 28 |
| Lillestrøm | Total | | 113 | 55 | 9 | 8 | — | | 2 | 1 | 3 | 0 | 127 | 64 |
| Shabab Al Ahli | 2021–22 | UAE Pro League | 11 | 5 | 0 | 0 | 3 | 2 | 6 (Note: Appearances in AFC Champions League) | 2 | — | | 20 | 9 |
| Lillestrøm | 2022 | Eliteserien | 11 | 5 | 0 | 0 | — | | 0 | 0 | — | | 11 | 5 |
| Lillestrøm | 2023 | Eliteserien | 26 | 14 | 6 | 3 | — | | — | | — | | 32 | 17 |
| Lillestrøm | 2024 | Eliteserien | 28 | 9 | 4 | 3 | — | | — | | — | | 32 | 12 |
| Lillestrøm | 2025 | 1. divisjon | 24 | 20 | 8 | 3 | — | | — | | — | | 32 | 23 |
| Lillestrøm | 2026 | Eliteserien | 14 | 5 | 2 | 1 | — | | 2 | 2 | — | | 18 | 8 |
| Lillestrøm | Total | | 103 | 53 | 20 | 10 | — | | 2 | 2 | — | | 125 | 65 |
| Career total | | | 445 | 215 | 48 | 36 | 3 | 2 | 15 | 5 | 3 | 0 | 514 | 259 |

== Honours ==
Strømsgodset

- Tippeligaen: 2013

Lillestrøm

- Norwegian Football Cup: 2025

Individual

- Eliteserien Player of the Month: July 2021
- Norwegian First Division Player of the Month: September 2025
- Norwegian First Division top scorer: 2025
