= Mads Hedenstad Christiansen =

Norwegian footballer (born 2000)

Personal information
- Date of birth: 21 October 2000 (age 26)
- Position: Goalkeeper

Team information
- Current team: AGF
- Number: 21

Youth career
- –2013: Fet
- 2014–2019: Lillestrøm

Senior career*
Years	Team	Apps	(Gls)
2019–2025	Lillestrøm	160	(1)
2026–	AGF	1	(0)

International career
2017	Norway U17	8	(0)
2018	Norway U18	6	(0)
2019	Norway U19	2	(0)
2021–2023	Norway U21	4	(0)
- * Club domestic league appearances and goals as of 31 July 2026

Mads Hedenstad Christiansen (born 21 October 2000) is a Norwegian professional footballer who plays as a goalkeeper for Danish Superliga club AGF.

== Career ==
He started his youth career in Fet IL, switching to Lillestrøm SK in 2014. After the odd bench appearance for the senior team in 2017 and 2018, he was benched for 16 games in 2019 and made his debut in 2020. Becoming their mostly used goalkeeper, he began the 2021 season on the bench but started his first Eliteserien match in May against Odd.

== Career statistics ==
As of 31 July 2026

Appearances and goals by club, season and competition
Club	Season	League			Norwegian Cup		Europe		Total	
Club	Season	Division	Apps	Goals	Apps	Goals	Apps	Goals	Apps	Goals
Lillestrøm	2020	1. divisjon	23	0	—		—		23	0
Lillestrøm	2021	Eliteserien	24	0	2	0	—		26	0
Lillestrøm	2022	Eliteserien	30	1	2	0	4 (Note: Appearances in UEFA Europa Conference League)	0	36	1
Lillestrøm	2023	Eliteserien	30	0	5	0	—		35	0
Lillestrøm	2024	Eliteserien	23	0	3	0	—		26	0
Lillestrøm	2025	1. divisjon	30	0	4	0	—		34	0
Lillestrøm	Total		160	1	16	0	4	0	180	1
AGF	2025–26	Danish Superliga	1	0	—		—		1	0
AGF	2026–27	Danish Superliga	0	0	0	0	2 (Note: Appearances in UEFA Champions League)	0	2	0
AGF	Total		1	0	0	0	2	0	3	0
Career total			161	1	16	0	6	0	183	1

== Honours ==
Lillestrøm

- Norwegian First Division: 2025
- Norwegian Cup: 2025; runner-up: 2022

AGF

- Danish Superliga: 2025–26

Individual

- Eliteserien Young Player of the Month: June 2021
- Eliteserien Young Player of the Year: 2021
