= Eskil Edh =

Norwegian footballer (born 2002)

Personal information
- Full name: Eskil Smidesang Edh
- Date of birth: 4 August 2002 (age 24)
- Height: 1.81 m (5 ft 11 in)
- Positions: Right-back; wing-back

Team information
- Current team: AIK
- Number: 2

Youth career
- –2016: Lillestrøm
- 2017: Skjetten
- 2018–2020: Lillestrøm

Senior career*
| Years | Team | Apps | (Gls) |
| 2020–2024 | Lillestrøm | 70 | (3) |
| 2024– | AIK | 29 | (2) |

International career^{‡}
| 2021 | Norway U19 | 1 | (0) |
| 2021–2023 | Norway U21 | 5 | (1) |
- * Club domestic league appearances and goals as of 8 July 2026 ‡ National team caps and goals as of 4 September 2023

Eskil Edh (born 4 August 2002) is a Norwegian footballer who plays as a defender for AIK.

== Career ==
He played youth football for Lillestrøm SK, except for the year 2017 in which he was with Skjetten SK. He made his senior debut for Lillestrøm in September 2020 against Kongsvinger. He officially signed a contract and became a part of the senior squad in November 2020. He made his Eliteserien debut in May 2021 against Viking. In the same year he made his debut as a Norway youth international. On 15 March 2024 Edh transferred to Allsvenskan side AIK signing a four-year long deal.

== Career statistics ==
As of 5 September 2024

Appearances and goals by club, season and competition
| Club | Season | League | | | National cup | | Europe | | Total | |
| Club | Season | Division | Apps | Goals | Apps | Goals | Apps | Goals | Apps | Goals |
|---|---|---|---|---|---|---|---|---|---|---|
| Lillestrøm | 2020 | 1. divisjon | 2 | 0 | — | | — | | 2 | 0 |
| Lillestrøm | 2021 | Eliteserien | 24 | 1 | 3 | 0 | — | | 27 | 1 |
| Lillestrøm | 2022 | Eliteserien | 19 | 1 | 3 | 0 | 4 (Note: Appearances in UEFA Europa Conference League) | 0 | 26 | 1 |
| Lillestrøm | 2023 | Eliteserien | 25 | 1 | 2 | 0 | — | | 27 | 1 |
| Lillestrøm | Total | | 70 | 3 | 8 | 0 | 4 | 0 | 82 | 3 |
| AIK | 2024 | Allsvenskan | 22 | 2 | 1 | 1 | — | | 14 | 2 |
| Career total | | | 83 | 4 | 9 | 1 | 4 | 0 | 96 | 5 |
