= Nesbyen IL =

Sports club in Nesbyen, Buskerud, Norway

Logo.

Nesbyen Idrettslag is a multi-sports club from Nes, Buskerud, Norway.

Established in 1902, it has sections for alpine skiing, cross-country skiing, association football, handball, athletics, and orienteering.

The athletics section arranged the Norwegian Championships in 1987. Pål Gunnar Mikkelsplass competed in athletics for the club.

The club currently has no junior or senior teams in football. Nesbyen IL entered a merger to form the club Hallingdal FK in 1994.
