= Hallingdal FK =

Norwegian football club

- Full name: Hallingdal Fotballklubb
- Founded: 23 March 1994
- Ground: Gol kunstgress, Gol
- League: Fourth Division
- 2024: 2nd

Hallingdal Fotballklubb is a Norwegian association football club from Hallingdal, Buskerud.

Hallingdal FK was founded on 23 March 1994 as an independent club; however, it was the intention to make it into an umbrella club for Nesbyen IL and IL Flåværingen. In late 1994, Nesbyen IL agreed to let Hallingdal FK become its legal successor and take over its place in the Fourth Division for both men and women. Hallingdal FK thus started competitive play in 1995.

The men's team played in the 2015 and 2016 Norwegian Third Division, and also reached the first rounds of the 2013 cup (losing 0–11 to Strømsgodset), the 2015 cup (losing 1–4 to Hønefoss) and the 2024 cup (losing 0–7 to Strømsgodset).

The women's team played in the Second Division for several years, until 2022. As of 2025, the club had no women's team.
