= Tom Pettersson =

Swedish footballer

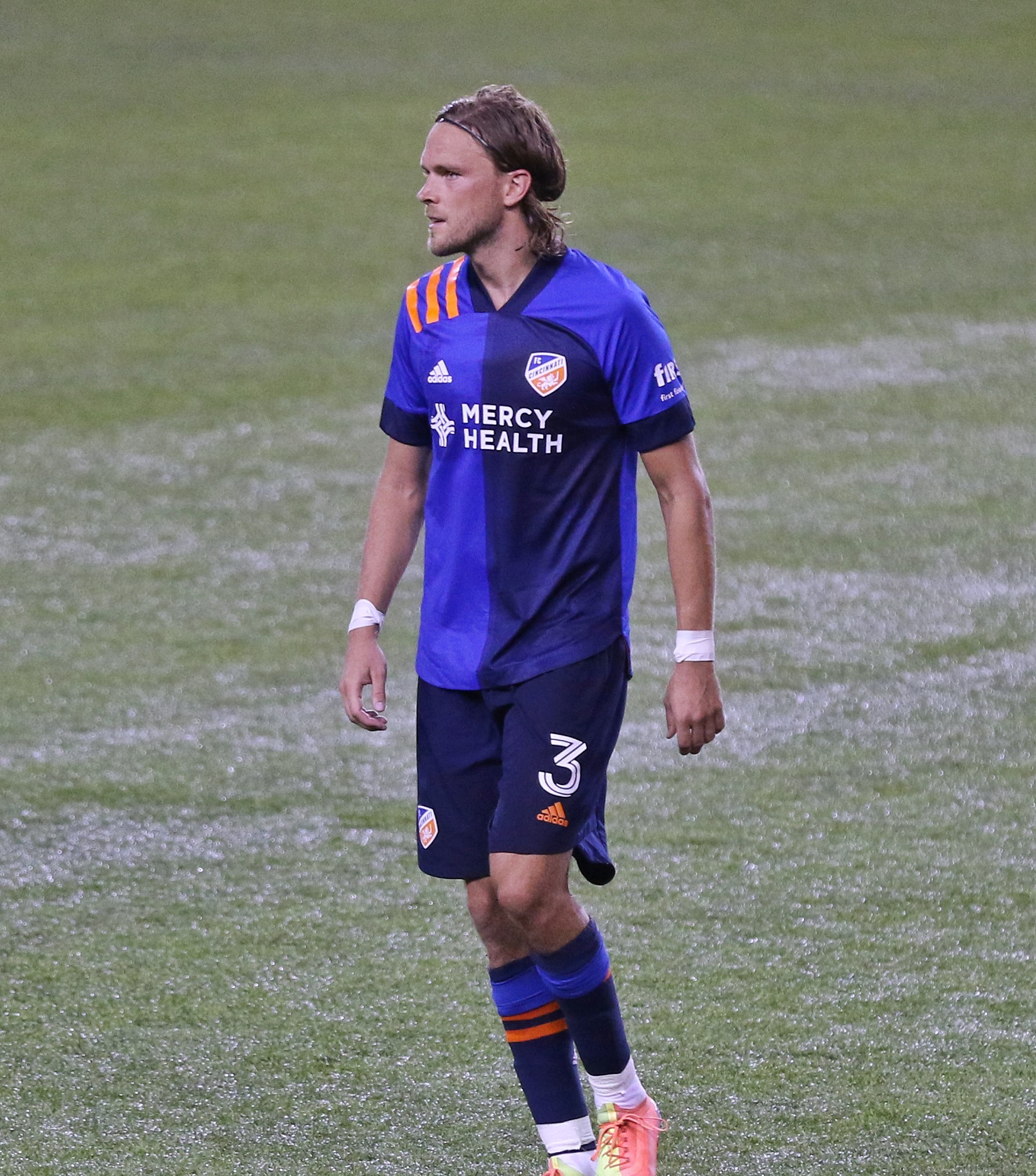

Personal information
- Full name: Tom Peder Pettersson
- Date of birth: 25 March 1990 (age 36)
- Place of birth: Trollhättan, Sweden
- Height: 1.90 m (6 ft 3 in)
- Positions: Central midfielder; centre back

Team information
- Current team: Mjällby
- Number: 24

Youth career
- –2006: Trollhättans FK

Senior career*
Years	Team	Apps	(Gls)
2007–2011	FC Trollhättan	101	(6)
2012–2014	Åtvidabergs FF	51	(5)
2013–2014	→ OH Leuven (loan)	17	(1)
2015–2016	IFK Göteborg	44	(3)
2017–2019	Östersunds FK	76	(3)
2020–2021	FC Cincinnati	15	(0)
2021–2022	Lillestrøm	27	(6)
2023–	Mjällby	77	(12)

International career^{‡}
2008	Sweden U19	4	(0)
2012	Sweden U21	5	(0)
- * Club domestic league appearances and goals as of 11 May 2026 ‡ National team caps and goals as of 16 October 2012

Tom Peder Pettersson (born 25 March 1990) is a Swedish footballer who plays as a defender for Allsvenskan club Mjällby.

== Career statistics ==
As of 19 July 2022

Club	Season	League			Cup		Continental		Total	
Club	Season	Division	Apps	Goals	Apps	Goals	Apps	Goals	Apps	Goals
FC Trollhättan	2007	Division 1 Södra	8	0	0	0	—		8	0
FC Trollhättan	2008	Division 1 Södra	16	0	0	0	—		16	0
FC Trollhättan	2009	Superettan	27	0	1	0	—		28	0
FC Trollhättan	2010	Superettan	27	2	3	1	—		30	3
FC Trollhättan	2011	Division 1 Södra	23	4	2	0	—		25	4
FC Trollhättan	Total		101	6	6	1	0	0	107	7
Åtvidabergs FF	2012	Allsvenskan	22	3	1	0	—		23	3
Åtvidabergs FF	2013	Allsvenskan	13	1	2	1	—		15	2
OH Leuven	2013–14	First Division A	17	1	1	0	—		18	1
OH Leuven	Total		17	1	1	0	0	0	18	1
Åtvidabergs FF	2014	Allsvenskan	16	1	1	0	—		17	1
Åtvidabergs FF	Total		51	5	4	1	0	0	55	6
IFK Göteborg	2015	Allsvenskan	25	1	7	2	3 (Note: Appearance(s) in UEFA Europa League)	0	35	3
IFK Göteborg	2016	Allsvenskan	19	2	1	1	7	0	27	3
IFK Göteborg	Total		44	3	8	3	10	0	62	6
Östersunds FK	2017	Allsvenskan	25	0	0	0	14	1	39	1
Östersunds FK	2018	Allsvenskan	28	2	0	0	0	0	28	2
Östersunds FK	2019	Allsvenskan	23	1	0	0	0	0	23	1
Östersunds FK	Total		76	3	0	0	14	1	90	4
FC Cincinnati	2020	Major League Soccer	16	0	1	0	—		17	0
FC Cincinnati	2021	Major League Soccer	4	0	0	0	—		4	0
FC Cincinnati	Total		20	0	1	0	0	0	21	0
Lillestrøm	2021	Eliteserien	17	3	0	0	—		17	3
Lillestrøm	2022	Eliteserien	10	3	2	1	—		12	4
Lillestrøm	Total		27	6	2	1	0	0	29	7
Career total			334	22	22	5	24	1	380	28

== Honours ==
FC Trollhättan

- Division 1 Södra: 2008

IFK Göteborg

- Svenska Cupen: 2014–15

Östersunds FK

- Svenska Cupen: 2016–17

Mjällby IF

- Allsvenskan: 2025
- Svenska Cupen: 2025–26
