= Tryggvi Hrafn Haraldsson =

Icelandic footballer

Tryggvi Haraldsson
Personal information
- Full name: Tryggvi Hrafn Haraldsson
- Date of birth: 30 September 1996 (age 30)
- Place of birth: Akranes, Iceland
- Height: 1.79 m (5 ft 10 in)
- Position: Forward

Team information
- Current team: Valur
- Number: 12

Youth career
- ÍA

Senior career*
Years	Team	Apps	(Gls)
2015–2017	ÍA	33	(6)
2016	→ Kári (loan)	3	(4)
2017–2018	Halmstad	27	(3)
2019–2020	ÍA	37	(15)
2020	Lillestrøm	10	(4)
2021–	Valur	134	(51)

International career^{‡}
2017–2018	Iceland U-21	13	(1)
2017–	Iceland	4	(1)
- * Club domestic league appearances and goals as of 16 November 2026 ‡ National team caps and goals as of 20 January 2020

Tryggvi Hrafn Haraldsson (born 30 September 1996) is an Icelandic footballer who plays as a forward for Valur.

== International career ==
Tryggvi made his senior team debut against Mexico on 8 February 2017.

=== International goals ===
#	Date	Venue	Opponent	Score	Result	Competition
1	11 January 2018	Maguwoharjo Stadium, Sleman, Indonesia	Indonesia Selection	4–0	6–0	Unofficial Friendly

== Honours ==
Individual

- Icelandic Premier League - Top scorer: 2023
