= Vetle Dragsnes =

Norwegian footballer (born 1994)

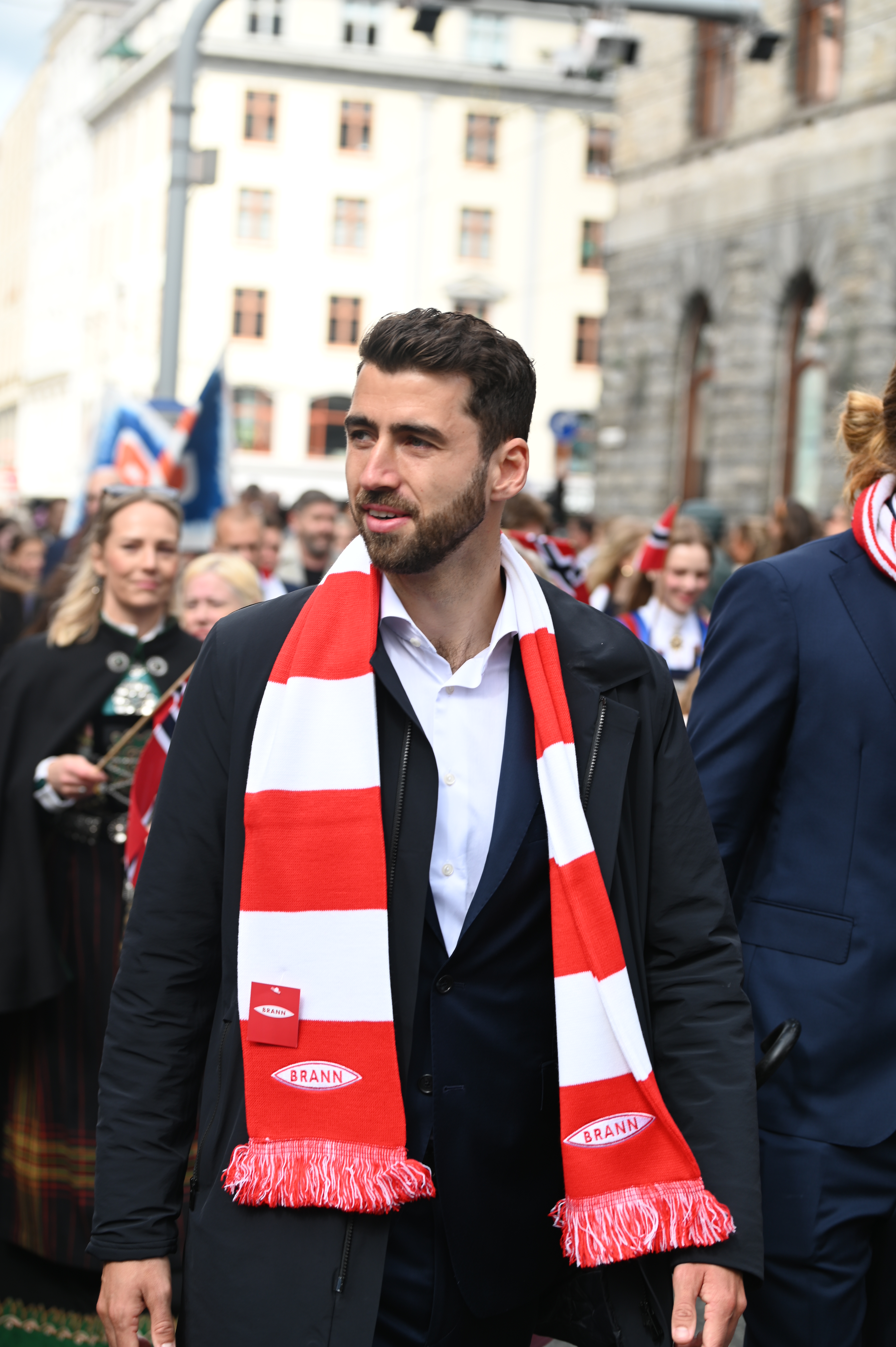

Personal information
- Full name: Vetle Winger Dragsnes
- Date of birth: 6 February 1994 (age 32)
- Place of birth: Rælingen, Norway
- Height: 1.87 m (6 ft 2 in)
- Position: Midfielder

Team information
- Current team: Brann
- Number: 20

Senior career*
Years	Team	Apps	(Gls)
2014–2015	Strømmen	31	(2)
2016–2017	Ullensaker/Kisa	44	(1)
2017–2020	Mjøndalen	101	(4)
2021–2023	Lillestrøm	79	(8)
2023–2025	Charleroi	69	(4)
2025–	Brann	29	(1)
- * Club domestic league appearances and goals as of 9 October 2026

Vetle Winger Dragsnes (born 6 February 1994) is a Norwegian footballer who plays for Norwegian club Brann.

== Club career ==
On 31 August 2023, Dragsnes signed a three-year contract with Charleroi in Belgium.

== Career statistics ==
=== Club ===
As of match played 15 October 2026

Appearances and goals by club, season and competition
Club	Season	League			National Cup		Continental		Other		Total	
Club	Season	Division	Apps	Goals	Apps	Goals	Apps	Goals	Apps	Goals	Apps	Goals
Strømmen	2014	1. divisjon	23	2	3	2	–		–		26	4
Strømmen	2015	OBOS-ligaen	8	0	4	0	–		–		12	0
Strømmen	Total		31	2	7	2	–		–		38	4
Ullensaker/Kisa	2016	OBOS-ligaen	28	1	2	0	–		–		30	1
Ullensaker/Kisa	2017	OBOS-ligaen	16	0	3	0	–		–		19	0
Ullensaker/Kisa	Total		44	1	5	0	–		–		49	1
Mjøndalen	2017	OBOS-ligaen	14	0	2	0	–		–		16	0
Mjøndalen	2018	OBOS-ligaen	30	0	3	0	–		–		33	0
Mjøndalen	2019	Eliteserien	27	2	4	0	–		–		31	2
Mjøndalen	2020	Eliteserien	30	2	0	0	–		–		30	2
Mjøndalen	Total		101	4	9	0	–		–		110	4
Lillestrøm	2021	Eliteserien	30	2	2	1	–		–		32	3
Lillestrøm	2022	Eliteserien	30	5	5	1	–		–		35	6
Lillestrøm	2023	Eliteserien	19	0	6	0	–		–		25	0
Lillestrøm	Total		79	7	13	2	–		–		92	9
Sporting Charleroi	2023–24	Belgian Pro League	29	3	2	0	–		–		31	3
Sporting Charleroi	2024–25	Belgian Pro League	38	0	1	0	–		–		39	0
Sporting Charleroi	2025–26	Belgian Pro League	2	1	0	0	1 (Note: Appearance in UEFA Conference League)	0	–		3	1
Sporting Charleroi	Total		69	4	3	0	1	0	–		73	4
Brann	2025	Eliteserien	12	0	0	0	6 (Note: Appearances in UEFA Europa League)	0	–		18	0
Brann	2026	Eliteserien	17	1	6	1	7 (Note: Four appearances in UEFA Europa League, three appearances in UEFA Conference League)	0	—		30	2
Brann	Total		29	1	6	1	13	0	—		48	2
Career total			353	19	43	5	14	0	0	0	410	24
