= Philip Slørdahl =

Norwegian footballer (born 2000)

Personal information
- Full name: Philip Alexander Kolberg Slørdahl
- Date of birth: 14 November 2000 (age 26)
- Position: Defender

Team information
- Current team: Ranheim
- Number: 2

Youth career
- –2014: Frigg
- 2015–2017: Sagene
- 2018–2019: Lillestrøm

Senior career*
Years	Team	Apps	(Gls)
2016–2018	Sagene		
2019–2023	Lillestrøm	42	(1)
2022	→ Sandefjord (loan)	5	(0)
2022	→ Sogndal (loan)	9	(0)
2024–	Ranheim	50	(0)

International career
2019	Norway U-19	3	(0)
- * Club domestic league appearances and goals as of 7 July 2026

Philip Alexander Kolberg Slørdahl (born 14 November 2000) is a Norwegian footballer who plays for Ranheim.

He played youth football for Frigg and Sagene, featuring for Sagene's senior team in the fifth and sixth tiers in Norway. In 2018 he joined Lillestrøm's youth setup, making his first-team, first-tier debut in 2019. He also represented Norway at the 2019 UEFA European Under-19 Championship.
