= Josef Baccay =

Filipino footballer (born 2001)

Personal information
- Full name: Josef Brian Johansen Baccay
- Date of birth: 29 April 2001 (age 25)
- Place of birth: Oslo, Norway
- Height: 1.78 m (5 ft 10 in)
- Position: Leftback

Team information
- Current team: Odd
- Number: 3

Youth career
- 2014–2017: Kolbotn
- 2017–2019: Lillestrøm

Senior career*
Years	Team	Apps	(Gls)
2019–2021	Lillestrøm	6	(0)
2020	→ Fredrikstad (loan)	11	(0)
2021	→ Kongsvinger (loan)	2	(0)
2022–	Odd	107	(2)

International career^{‡}
2017	Norway U16	5	(0)
2018	Norway U17	12	(1)
2019	Norway U18	7	(0)
2022	Norway U21	1	(0)
2025–	Philippines	5	(0)
- * Club domestic league appearances and goals as of 1 December 2025 ‡ National team caps and goals as of 1 December 2025

Josef Brian Johansen Baccay (born 29 April 2001) is a professional footballer who plays as a leftback for Norwegian First Division club Odd. Born in Norway, he plays for the Philippines national team.

== Professional career ==
On 16 May 2018, Baccay signed his first professional contract with Lillestrøm. Baccay made his professional debut with Lillestrøm in a 2-0 Eliteserien loss to Molde FK on 22 April 2019.

== International career ==
Baccay was born in Norway to a Filipino father and Norwegian mother. Baccay is a youth international for Norway.

=== Philippines ===
In March 2024, Baccay was reportedly one of the players being recruited by head coach Tom Saintfiet and team manager Freddy Gonzalez to play for the Philippines. On 10 March 2025, Baccay was included in the 24-man squad of the Philippines for the 2027 AFC Asian Cup qualification match against Maldives. 7 days later, his request to switch international allegiance to the Philippines was approved by FIFA.

Baccay made his debut for the Philippines in a 4–1 victory against the Maldives. He came in as a second-half substitute, replacing Michael Kempter in the 46th minute. He provided the assist for the Philippines' fourth goal in the 92nd minute.
