= Lars Ranger =

Norwegian footballer (born 1999)

Personal information
- Full name: Lars Mogstad Ranger
- Date of birth: 12 March 1999 (age 27)
- Place of birth: Gjerdrum, Norway
- Height: 1.76 m (5 ft 9 in)
- Position: Right back

Team information
- Current team: Lillestrøm
- Number: 2

Youth career
- –2014: Gjerdrum
- 2015–2018: Lillestrøm

Senior career*
Years	Team	Apps	(Gls)
2014	Gjerdrum		
2019–	Lillestrøm	115	(7)
2019	→ Ull/Kisa (loan)	19	(1)

International career^{‡}
2018	Norway U19	1	(0)
2019	Norway U20	2	(0)
2019	Norway U21		(0)
- * Club domestic league appearances and goals as of 23 July 2026 ‡ National team caps and goals as of 5 May 2023

Lars Mogstad Ranger (born 12 March 1999) is a Norwegian football defender who plays as a right back for Lillestrøm.
