= Igoh Ogbu =

Nigerian footballer (born 2000)

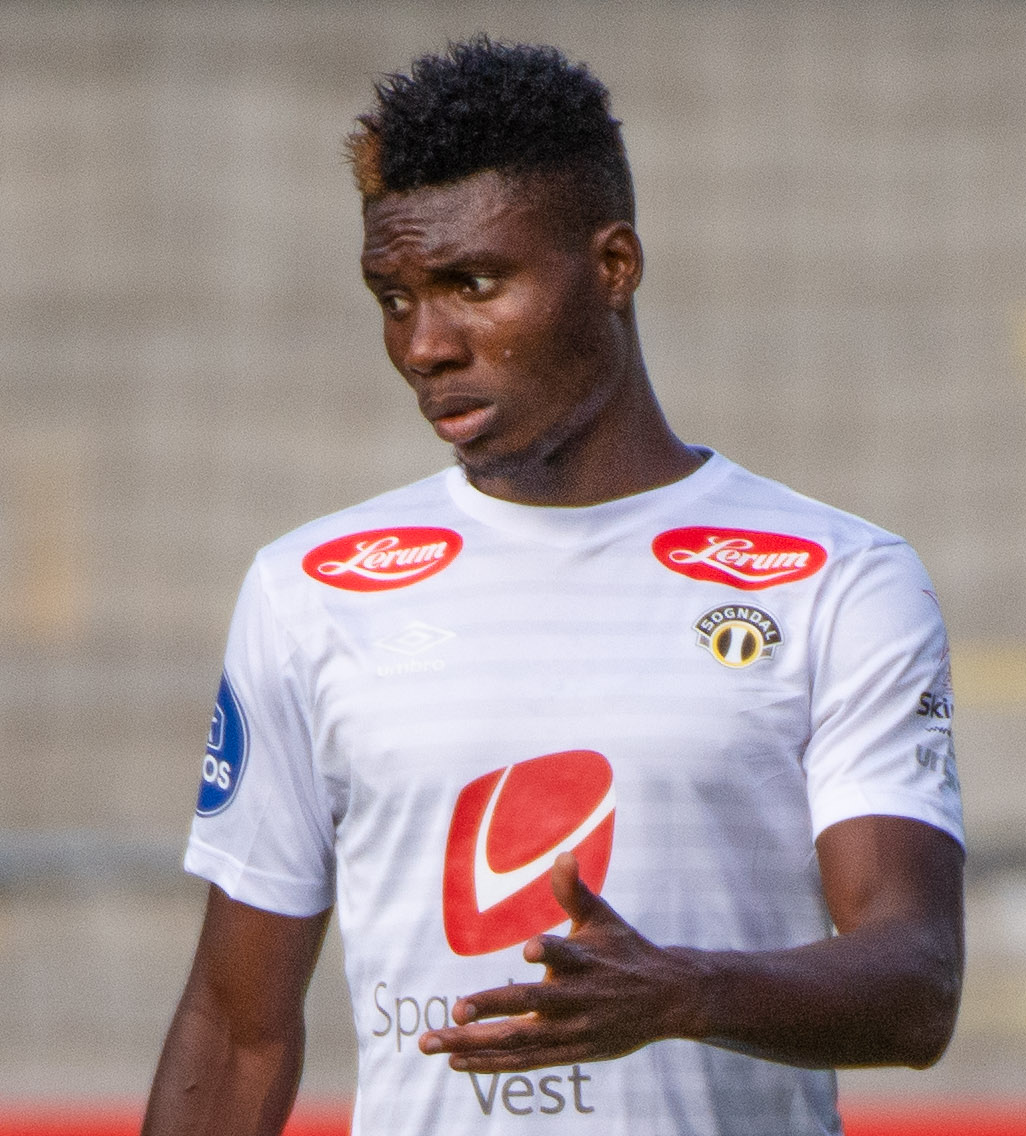
- Ogbu with Sogndal in 2020

Personal information
- Date of birth: 8 February 2000 (age 26)
- Place of birth: Jos, Nigeria
- Height: 1.87 m (6 ft 2 in)
- Position: Centre-back

Team information
- Current team: Slavia Prague
- Number: 5

Youth career
- 2017–2018: Gombe United

Senior career*
Years	Team	Apps	(Gls)
2018–2020	Rosenborg	0	(0)
2018	→ Levanger (loan)	9	(0)
2019	→ Sogndal (loan)	15	(1)
2020	Sogndal	26	(1)
2021–2022	Lillestrøm	54	(4)
2023–	Slavia Prague	87	(4)

International career^{‡}
2019	Nigeria U20	7	(0)
2025–	Nigeria	12	(0)
Medal record
Men's football
Representing Nigeria
Africa Cup of Nations
Third place	2025 Morocco
- * Club domestic league appearances and goals as of 24 May 2026 ‡ National team caps and goals as of 3 June 2026

Igoh Ogbu (born 8 February 2000) is a Nigerian professional footballer who plays as a centre-back for Czech First League club Slavia Prague and the Nigeria national team.

== Club career ==
Ogbu started his career with Gombe United in Nigeria, before joining Norwegian club Rosenborg in February 2018, where he signed a four-year contract. Following loan spells with Levanger and Sogndal, Ogbu joined the latter permanently in June 2020. On 29 January 2021, he joined Lillestrøm on a five-year contract. He made his Eliteserien debut on 16 May 2021 against Strømsgodset. On 6 January 2023, he joined Slavia Prague on a three-year contract. On 24 May 2025, Ogbu extended his contract with Slavia until 31 December 2027.

== International career ==
Ogbu featured for the Nigeria national under-20 team at the 2019 Africa U-20 Cup of Nations and the 2019 FIFA U-20 World Cup, making a total of seven appearances. He was called up to the senior Nigeria national team for the friendly 2025 Unity Cup tournament in May 2025.

On 11 December 2025, Ogbu was called up to the Nigeria squad for the 2025 Africa Cup of Nations.

== Career statistics ==
=== Club ===
As of match played 24 May 2026

Appearances and goals by club, season and competition
Club	Season	League			National cup (Note: Includes Norwegian Cup, Czech Cup)		Continental		Other		Total	
Club	Season	Division	Apps	Goals	Apps	Goals	Apps	Goals	Apps	Goals	Apps	Goals
Rosenborg	2019	Eliteserien	—		1	0	—		—		1	0
Levanger (loan)	2018	Norwegian First Division	9	0	1	0	—		—		10	0
Sogndal (loan)	2019	Norwegian First Division	15	1	—		—		1 (Note: Appearances in promotion play-offs)	0	16	1
Sogndal	2020	Norwegian First Division	26	1	—		—		2	0	28	1
Lillestrøm	2021	Eliteserien	26	1	4	0	—		—		30	1
Lillestrøm	2022	Eliteserien	28	3	0	0	3 (Note: Appearances in UEFA Europa Conference League)	0	—		31	3
Lillestrøm	Total		54	4	4	0	3	0	0	0	61	4
Slavia Prague	2022–23	Czech First League	16	1	2	0	—		—		18	1
Slavia Prague	2023–24	Czech First League	30	0	2	0	9 (Note: Appearances in UEFA Europa League)	2	—		41	2
Slavia Prague	2024–25	Czech First League	25	2	2	0	7 (Note: Four appearances in UEFA Champions League, three appearances in UEFA Europa League)	0	—		34	2
Slavia Prague	2025–26	Czech First League	16	1	1	0	2 (Note: Appearances in UEFA Champions League)	0	—		19	1
Slavia Prague	Total		87	4	6	0	18	2	0	0	112	6
Career total			182	10	13	0	21	2	3	0	219	12

=== International ===
As of match played 3 June 2026

Appearances and goals by national team and year
National team	Year	Apps	Goals
Nigeria	2025	5	0
Nigeria	2026	7	0
Total		12	0

== Honours ==
Slavia Prague

- Czech First League: 2024–25, 2025–26
- Czech Cup: 2022–23

Nigeria

- Africa Cup of Nations third place: 2025

Individual

- Eliteserien Player of the Month: April 2022
