= 2025 Lillestrøm SK season =

Lillestrøm
2025 season
- Chairman: Morten Kokkim
- Head coach: Hans Erik Ødegaard
- Stadium: Åråsen Stadion
- 1. divisjon: 1st (promoted)
- 2025 Norwegian Cup: Winners
- 2025–26 Norwegian Cup: Fourth round
- Top goalscorer: League: Thomas Lehne Olsen (20); All: Thomas Lehne Olsen (23)
- Biggest win: Mjøndalen 0–6 Lillestrøm; Odd 1–7 Lillestrøm
Home colours	Away colours	Third colours

The 2025 season was the 108th in the history of Lillestrøm SK and their first season in the second tier of Norwegian football. The club competed in the Norwegian First Division and the Norwegian Football Cup.

On 29 September 2025, the team secured promotion following a 5–1 away victory against Moss. Lillestrøm completed the season without a single defeat across 40 matches.

== Transfers ==
=== In ===
Pos.	Player	Transferred from	Fee	Date	Source
MF	(The Gambia) Salieu Drammeh	(Denmark) Frem	Undisclosed	30 January 2025	
FW	(Nigeria) Kparobo Arierhi	(Nigeria) Beyond Limits	Undisclosed	10 March 2025	
FW	(England) Jubril Adedeji	(Denmark) AaB Fodbold	Loan	19 March 2025	

=== Out ===
Pos.	Player	Transferred to	Fee	Date	Source
DF	(Norway) Martin Ove Roseth	(Norway) Viking	Undisclosed	18 February 2025	
DF	(Nigeria) Uba Charles Nwokoma	(Sweden) Mjällby AIF	Loan	13 March 2025	
FW	(Nigeria) Efe Lucky	(Norway) Åsane	Loan	26 March 2025	
MF	(Norway) Leandro Elvestad Neto	(Norway) Mjøndalen	Loan	2 May 2025	
MF	(Norway) Leandro Elvestad Neto	(Norway) Skeid	Loan	15 August 2025	

== Friendlies ==
=== Pre-season ===
25 January 2025 Friendly	Lillestrøm (Norway)	2–0	(Sweden) IFK Göteborg
14:00

4 February 2025 Friendly	Lillestrøm (Norway)	4–2	(Norway) Skeid
14:00		Report

7 February 2025 Friendly	Lillestrøm (Norway)	4–1	(Norway) Ull/Kisa
12:00

14 February 2025 Friendly	Lillestrøm (Norway)	2–1	(Ukraine) LNZ Cherkasy	Marbella, Spain
16:00		Report

22 February 2025 Friendly	Lillestrøm (Norway)	1–1	(Norway) Haugesund
14:00

28 February 2025 Friendly	Lillestrøm (Norway)	0–5	(Norway) KFUM
13:00

8 March 2025 Friendly	Lillestrøm (Norway)	4–0	(Iceland) Fram Reykjavík
14:00

15 March 2025 Friendly	Lillestrøm (Norway)	2–1	(Norway) Odd
14:00

18 March 2025 Friendly	Lillestrøm (Norway)	3–1	(Norway) Raufoss
14:00

22 March 2025 Friendly	Fredrikstad (Norway)	1–0	(Norway) Lillestrøm
15:00

8 October 2025 Friendly	IFK Göteborg (Sweden)	0–0	(Norway) Lillestrøm
14:00

== Competitions ==
=== Overview ===
Competition	First match	Last match	Starting round	Final position	Record							
Competition	First match	Last match	Starting round	Final position	Pld	W	D	L	GF	GA	GD	Win %
Norwegian First Division	31 March 2025	8 November 2025	Matchday 1	Winners	30	25	5	0	87	18	+69	83.33
2025 Norwegian Cup	13 April 2025	6 December 2025	First round	Winners	7	6	1	0	18	4	+14	85.71
2025–26 Norwegian Cup	13 August 2025	See 2026 season	First round	See 2026 season	3	3	0	0	9	4	+5	100.00
Total					40	34	6	0	114	26	+88	85.00

Source: Competitions

=== First Division ===
==== League table ====
Pos	Team	Pld	W	D	L	GF	GA	GD	Pts	Promotion, qualification or relegation
1	Lillestrøm (C, P)	30	25	5	0	87	18	+69	80	Promotion to Eliteserien and qualification for the Europa League play-off round (Note: Lillestrøm qualified for the Europa League play-off round as winners of the 2025 Norwegian Football Cup.)
2	Start (P)	30	16	7	7	58	35	+23	55	Promotion to Eliteserien
3	Kongsvinger	30	15	9	6	61	42	+19	54	Qualification for the promotion play-offs third round
4	Aalesund (O, P)	30	14	10	6	56	35	+21	52	Qualification for the promotion play-offs second round
5	Egersund	30	15	7	8	51	38	+13	52	Qualification for the promotion play-offs first round

Source: OBOS-ligaen (in Norwegian)
Rules for classification: 1) Points; 2) Goal difference; 3) Goals scored; 4) Head-to-head points; 5) Head-to-head goal difference; 6) Head-to-head goals scored.
(C) Champions; (O) Play-off winners; (P) Promoted

==== Results summary ====
Overall								Home						Away					
Pld	W	D	L	GF	GA	GD	Pts	W	D	L	GF	GA	GD	W	D	L	GF	GA	GD
30	25	5	0	87	18	+69	80	13	2	0	40	8	+32	12	3	0	47	10	+37

Source: NFF

==== Results by round ====
Round	1	2	3	4	5	6	7	8	9	10	11	12	13	14	15	16	17	18	19	20	21	22	23	24	25	26	27	28	29	30
Ground	A	H	A	A	H	A	H	A	H	A	H	A	H	A	H	A	H	A	H	A	H	A	H	A	H	H	A	H	A	H
Result	D	W	W	W	W	D	W	W	W	D	D	W	D	W	W	W	W	W	W	W	W	W	W	W	W	W	W	W	W	W
Position	6	5	3	3	1	1	1	1	1	1	1	1	1	1	1	1	1	1	1	1	1	1	1	1	1	1	1	1	1	1

Source: NFF
A = Away; H = Home; W = Win; D = Draw; L = Loss

==== Matches ====
31 March 2025 1	Aalesund	2–2	Lillestrøm	Ålesund
19:00 UTC+2	Braga 4'; Snær Jóhannsson 25'; Ngongo (penalty missed) 50'; Kjelsen (yellow card) 55'	Report	Kitolano 11' (yellow card) 50'; Lehne Olsen 43'	Stadium: Color Line Stadion; Attendance: 5,003; Referee: Steinar Hauge

5 April 2025 2	Lillestrøm	1–0	Odd	Lillestrøm
16:00 UTC+2	Lehne Olsen 81'	Report	Solholm Johansen (yellow card) 15'; Aas (yellow card) 88'; Abdulateef (yellow card) 90'	Stadium: Åråsen Stadion; Attendance: 7,555; Referee: Magnus Nicolai Koløy

21 April 2025 3	Stabæk	0–3	Lillestrøm	Bekkestua
17:00 UTC+2	Onsrud (yellow card) 34'	Report	Karlsbakk (yellow card) 21'; Drammeh 30', 51' (yellow card) 56'; Lehne Olsen 45+1'	Stadium: Nadderud Stadion; Attendance: 4,321; Referee: Ajdin Medic

27 April 2025 4	Lyn	0–1	Lillestrøm	Oslo
17:00 UTC+2	Nilsen (yellow card) 59'; Ingebrigtsen (yellow card) 64'	Report	Karlsbakk 54'; Vá (yellow card) 75'; Hedenstad (yellow card) 84'	Stadium: Bislett Stadion; Attendance: 7,012; Referee: Johan William Grundt

3 May 2025 5	Lillestrøm	3–0	Moss	Lillestrøm
16:00 UTC+2	Diop 36', 57'; Drammeh 44'; Elkær (yellow card) 55'; Karlsbakk (yellow card) 70'	Report	Benarfa (yellow card) 86'	Stadium: Åråsen Stadion; Attendance: 6,118; Referee: Ali al Hatam

12 May 2025 6	Skeid	1–1	Lillestrøm	Oslo
19:00 UTC+2	Fiksdal 88'	Report	Hoff (yellow card) 45'; Karlsbakk 47'; Kitolano (yellow card) 75'; Moen Foss (yellow card) 81'	Stadium: Nordre Åsen; Attendance: 1,600; Referee: Ole-Alexander Ekeli Valen

16 May 2025 7	Lillestrøm	2–0	Kongsvinger	Lillestrøm
19:00 UTC+2	Lehne Olsen 41', 43'; Larsson (yellow card) 63'	Report	Holter (yellow card) 45+1'; Nilsson (yellow card) 81'; Holmé (yellow card) 81'	Stadium: Åråsen Stadion; Attendance: 9,379; Referee: Stian Røvig Sletner

24 May 2025 8	Mjøndalen	0–6	Lillestrøm	Mjøndalen
16:00 UTC+2	Singh (yellow card) 38'; Reuterswärd (yellow card) 41'; Bata (yellow card) 60'	Report	Karlsbakk 4'; Kitolano 9', 45+1' (yellow card) 38'; Drammeh 36'; Vá 76', 86'	Stadium: Consto Arena; Attendance: 1,676; Referee: Mischa Kellerhals

31 May 2025 9	Lillestrøm	1–0	Egersund	Lillestrøm
16:00 UTC+2	Larsson (yellow card) 21'; Lehne Olsen 32'	Report	Ghebreyohannes (yellow card) 10'; Pichkah (yellow card) 18'; Oprea (yellow card) 78'; Jenssen (yellow card) 90+5'	Stadium: Åråsen Stadion; Attendance: 5,505; Referee: Steinar Hauge

14 June 2025 10	Hødd	2–2	Lillestrøm	Ulsteinvik
18:00 UTC+2	Visted (yellow card) 6' (goal) 20'; Kallevåg (penalty missed) 25' 25'; Blikstad (yellow card) 55'; Mulac (yellow card) 67'; Myrlid (yellow card) 71'; Hanssen (yellow card) 73'	Report	Lehne Olsen 48', 79' (pen.); Larsson (yellow card) 50'	Stadium: Høddvoll; Attendance: 2,175; Referee: Mohammad Hafezi

18 June 2025 11	Lillestrøm	2–2	Åsane	Lillestrøm
19:00 UTC+2	Diop 36'; Karlsbakk 43'	Report	Eikrem (yellow card) 27'; Lucky 29'; Lie Skålevik (yellow card) 50'; Vådebu (yellow card) 68'; Sildnes 78'	Stadium: Åråsen Stadion; Attendance: 4,872; Referee: Harald Vollstad Sletner

21 June 2025 12	Ranheim	0–4	Lillestrøm	Trondheim
16:00 UTC+2	Alvheim (yellow card) 56'; Holden (yellow card) 90'	Report	Kitolano 26'; Moen Foss 43'; Lehne Olsen 45', 66'; Woxen (yellow card) 90+3'	Stadium: EXTRA Arena; Attendance: 1,176; Referee: Johan William Grundt

28 June 2025 13	Lillestrøm	0–0	Sogndal	Lillestrøm
16:00 UTC+2	Gabrielsen (yellow card) 11'; Hoff (yellow card) 33'; Moen Foss (yellow card) 74'	Report	Høyland (yellow card) 79'; Mensah (yellow card) 90+6'	Stadium: Åråsen Stadion; Attendance: 5,373; Referee: Mischa Kellerhals

26 July 2025 14	Start	0–3	Lillestrøm	Kristiansand
14:00 UTC+2	Gono (yellow card) 18'; Strannegård (yellow card) 45'; S. Hansen (yellow card) 48'; Ugland (yellow card) 62'	Report	Ranger 43' (yellow card) 55'; Woxen (yellow card) 67' (goal) 86'; Elkær 76'	Stadium: Sparebanken Norge Arena; Attendance: 6,321; Referee: Magnus Nicolai Koløy

30 July 2025 15	Lillestrøm	2–1	Raufoss	Lillestrøm
20:00 UTC+2	Alperud 16'; Kitolano (yellow card) 30'; Karlsbakk 76'	Report	Aanesland (yellow card) 59'; A. Hansen (yellow card) 61'; Fors (yellow card) 67'; Lynum 70' (yellow card) 78'; Agyeman (yellow card) 74'	Stadium: Åråsen Stadion; Attendance: 5,875; Referee: Ole-Alexander Ekeli Valen

2 August 2025 16	Åsane	1–2	Lillestrøm	Bergen
16:00 UTC+2	Garnås 20' (o.g.); Møller Wolfe (yellow card) 35'; Lie Skålevik (yellow card) 90+2'	Report	Lehne Olsen 7'; Hoff (yellow card) 59'; Ranger 75'	Stadium: Åsane Arena; Attendance: 688; Referee: Herman Holthe

10 August 2025 17	Lillestrøm	5–1	Aalesund	Lillestrøm
14:30 UTC+2	Drammeh 6'; Hedenstad (yellow card) 9'; Kitolano 21', 86'; Lehne Olsen (penalty missed) 52' 52'; Karlsbakk 82'	Report	Guðmundsson (yellow card) 52' (goal) 72'; Ørsahl (yellow card) 67'; Ngongo (yellow card) 77'	Stadium: Åråsen Stadion; Attendance: 6,433; Referee: Mathias Støfringshaug

6 August 2025 18	Egersund	0–2	Lillestrøm	Egersund
19:00 UTC+2	Kleppa (yellow card) 80'	Report	Tønnessen 34'; Karlsbakk 67'	Stadium: B&G Parken; Attendance: 1,094; Referee: Ali al Hatam

16 August 2025 19	Lillestrøm	3–0	Start	Lillestrøm
18:00 UTC+2	Kitolano 61'; Tønnessen 68'; Hoff 89'	Report	Dashaev (yellow card) 71'	Stadium: Åråsen Stadion; Attendance: 6,729; Referee: Marius Lien

23 August 2025 20	Raufoss	1–2	Lillestrøm	Raufoss
16:00 UTC+2	Osnes-Ringen (yellow card) 63'; Agyeman 86'; Bonde (yellow card) 90+2'	Report	Lehne Olsen 43' (pen.); Woxen 54'; Ranger (yellow card) 90+4'	Stadium: Nammo Stadion; Attendance: 2,178; Referee: Mischa Kellerhals

30 August 2025 21	Lillestrøm	3–1	Skeid	Lillestrøm
16:00 UTC+2	Drammeh 54', 86'; Woxen 72'; Elkær (yellow card) 76'	Report	Stensrud 36'; Toure (yellow card) 69'	Stadium: Åråsen Stadion; Attendance: 6,327; Referee: Steinar Hauge

13 September 2025 22	Sogndal	1–5	Lillestrøm	Sogndalsfjøra
16:00 UTC+2	Skaanes 25'	Report	Karlsbakk 4', 90'; Lehne Olsen 46'; Ranger 49'; Drammeh 64'; Vá (yellow card) 82'	Stadium: Fosshaugane Campus; Attendance: 2,271; Referee: Magnus Nicolai Koløy

20 September 2025 23	Lillestrøm	4–1	Mjøndalen	Lillestrøm
16:00 UTC+2	Kitolano 35'; Lehne Olsen 56' (pen.), 63', 74'	Report	Bata (yellow card) 49'; Reuterswärd 71'; Godwin (yellow card) 76'	Stadium: Åråsen Stadion; Attendance: 5,298; Referee: Harald Vollstad Sletner

29 September 2025 24	Moss	1–5	Lillestrøm	Moss
19:00 UTC+2	Rossi (yellow card) 13'; Grønli 61'	Report	Lehne Olsen 7' (pen.), 48'; Woxen 40'; Karlsbakk 45+1'; Hoff (yellow card) 47'; Ranger (yellow card) 57'; Drammeh 68'; Tønnessen (yellow card) 70'; Vá (yellow card) 90'	Stadium: Melløs Stadion; Attendance: 2,237; Referee: Mischa Kellerhals

4 October 2025 25	Lillestrøm	4–0	Hødd	Lillestrøm
16:00 UTC+2	Moen Foss 23'; Karlsbakk (yellow card) 33' (goal) 85' (pen.); Lehne Olsen 47'; Woxen (yellow card) 51'; Elkær 68'	Report	Skotheim (yellow card) 28'; Mikhail (yellow card) 85'	Stadium: Åråsen Stadion; Attendance: 4,704; Referee: Ali al Hatam

17 October 2025 26	Lillestrøm	5–1	Lyn	Lillestrøm
19:00 UTC+2	Kitolano 9'; Gabrielsen (yellow card) 30'; Elkær 35'; Hoff (yellow card) 38'; Karlsbakk 52'; Garnås 61'; Diop 85'	Report	Johansen 2'; Haugen (yellow card) 45+3'; Sylla (yellow card) 82'; Barnett (yellow card) 88'	Stadium: Åråsen Stadion; Attendance: 6,517; Referee: Marius Lien

22 October 2025 27	Odd	1–7	Lillestrøm	Skien
18:00 UTC+2	Skjeldal (yellow card) 45'; Hussain 57'	Report	Kitolano 13', 15', 70'; Diop 18'; Gabrielsen 24'; Elkær 41'; Karlsbakk 90'	Stadium: Skagerak Arena; Attendance: 2,900; Referee: Jan Morten Tennøy

25 October 2025 28	Lillestrøm	2–1	Ranheim	Lillestrøm
16:00 UTC+2	Paintsil 31'; Vá (yellow card) 62'; Drammeh 67'	Report	Haukeberg 51'	Stadium: Åråsen Stadion; Attendance: 5,445; Referee: Magnus Nicolai Koløy

1 November 2025 29	Kongsvinger	0–2	Lillestrøm	Kongsvinger
16:00 UTC+1	Nielsen (yellow card) 49'; Christiansen (yellow card) 67'; Williams (yellow card) 86'	Report	Paintsil 30'; Kitolano 45+1'; Ranger (yellow card) 48'; Garnås (yellow card) 80'	Stadium: Gjemselund Stadion; Attendance: 4,507; Referee: Harald Vollstad Sletner

8 November 2025 30	Lillestrøm	3–0	Stabæk	Lillestrøm
15:00 UTC+1	Vá 22', 67'; Diop (yellow card) 39'; Gabrielsen (yellow card) 65'; Kitolano 83'	Report	Diabaté (yellow card) 23'; Hellan (yellow card) 29'; Debra (yellow card) 69'	Stadium: Åråsen Stadion; Attendance: 7,028; Referee: Johan William Grundt

=== Norwegian Football Cup ===
==== 2025 ====
13 April 2025 First round	Skjetten	0–5	Lillestrøm	Skjetten
16:00 UTC+2		Report	Krygård (yellow card) 31'; Diop 39', 50', 56'; Karlsbakk 64'; Vá 78'	Stadium: Skjetten Stadion; Referee: Stian Røvig Sletner

24 April 2025 Second round	Eidsvold Turn	0–2	Lillestrøm	Eidsvoll
18:30 UTC+2		Report	Adedeji 34'; Larsson (yellow card) 77'; Neto (yellow card) 81'; Ranger (yellow card) 90+1'; Vá (yellow card) 90+3' (goal) 90+4'	Stadium: Myhrer 1 Attendance: 1,020; Referee: Magnus Nicolai Koløy

7 May 2025 Third round	Grorud	2–3 (a.e.t.)	Lillestrøm	Oslo
18:00 UTC+2	Fajfric 39'; Khris (yellow card) 90+6'; Victorio (yellow card) 97'; Etholm (yellow card) 108'; Asp 118'	Report	Vá 53' (yellow card) 78'; Kitolano 98'; Karlsbakk 102'; Gabrielsen (yellow card) 110'	Stadium: Grorud match kunstgress Attendance: 1,397; Referee: Harald Vollstad Sletner

21 May 2025 Fourth round	Lillestrøm	1–1 (a.e.t.) (3–1 p)	Fredrikstad	Lillestrøm
19:00 UTC+2	Lehne Olsen 13'; Krygård (yellow card) 69'; Karlsbakk (yellow card) 84'; Elkær (yellow card) 93'	Report	Molde 50'; Sørløkk (yellow card) 67'; Eid (yellow card) 74'	Stadium: Åråsen Stadion; Attendance: 4,077; Referee: Ola Hobber Nilsen
	Penalties
	Karlsbakk (penalty scored); Krygård (penalty scored); Gabrielsen (penalty scored); Kitolano (penalty missed)		(penalty missed) Holten; (penalty scored) Øhlenschlæger; (penalty missed) Eid; (penalty missed) Sørløkk

25 June 2025 Quarter-finals	Lillestrøm	2–0	KFUM Oslo	Lillestrøm
18:00 UTC+2	Karlsbakk 51'; Diop 84'	Report	Kristensen (yellow card) 26'; Tønnessen (yellow card) 38'	Stadium: Åråsen Stadion; Attendance: 6,152; Referee: Marius Hansen Grøtta

9 July 2025 Semi-finals	Lillestrøm	2–0	Kristiansund	Lillestrøm
18:00 UTC+2	Karlsbakk 33' (yellow card) 34'; Lehne Olsen 45+2'	Report	Ødegård (yellow card) 90+2'	Stadium: Åråsen Stadion; Attendance: 8,220; Referee: Rohit Saggi

6 December 2025 Final	Lillestrøm	3–1	Sarpsborg 08	Oslo
16:00 UTC+1	Lehne Olsen 69'; Karlsbakk 73' (yellow card) 89'; Kitolano (yellow card) 76'; Garnås 79'; Gabrielsen (yellow card) 90+7'	Report	Berget 30'; Utvik (yellow card) 45'; Sher (yellow card) 56'; Koch (yellow card) 77'	Stadium: Ullevaal Stadion; Attendance: 23,202; Referee: Sivert Amland

==== 2025–26 ====
13 August 2025 First round	Lørenskog	1–4	Lillestrøm	Lørenskog
18:00 UTC+2	Harvey 41' (yellow card) 78'	Report	Diop 18'; Woxen 50' (yellow card) 88'; Svenningsen 53'; Wæhler 79'	Stadium: Rolvsrud stadion Attendance: 1,030; Referee: Hakan Catalgøl

27 August 2025 Second round	Hønefoss	2–3	Lillestrøm	Hønefoss
20:15 UTC+2	Rydje (yellow card) 47'; Randers (yellow card) 52'; Elvevold 58'; Holte 90+4'	Report	Paintsil (yellow card) 17'; Gabrielsen (red card) 56'; Elkær 74'; Karlsbakk 78'; Woxen 90+2'	Stadium: AKA Arena; Attendance: 1,024; Referee: Johan William Grundt

24 September 2025 Third round	Sandnes Ulf	1–2	Lillestrøm	Sandnes
18:00 UTC+2	Pereira 41'; Osenbroch (yellow card) 60'; Egell-Johnsen (yellow card) 65'; Arifagic (yellow card) 90'	Report	Woxen 32' (yellow card) 33'; Vá 52'; Kitolano (penalty missed) 63' (yellow card) 90'; Moen Foss (yellow card) 88'	Stadium: Øster Hus Arena; Attendance: 872; Referee: Svein Tore Sinnes

The remaining rounds took place during the 2026 season.
