= 2026 Lillestrøm SK season =

Lillestrøm
2026 season
- Chairman: Morten Kokkim
- Head coach: Hans Erik Ødegaard
- Stadium: Åråsen Stadion
- Eliteserien: 4th
- 2025–26 Norwegian Cup: Quarter-finals
- 2026–27 Norwegian Cup: Pre-season
- 2026–27 Europa League: Pre-season
Home colours	Away colours	Third colours

The 2026 season is the 109th season in the history of Lillestrøm Sportsklubb and the first in the Eliteserien after one year in the lower division following promotion. In addition, Lillestrøm will participate in the 2026–27 Norwegian Football Cup. The team also completed its participation in the 2025–26 Norwegian Football Cup, where it was eliminated in the quarter-finals.

== Transfers ==
=== In ===
Pos.	Player	Transferred from	Fee	Date	Source
GK	(Sweden) Pontus Dahlberg	(Sweden) IFK Göteborg		22 December 2025	
FW	(Nigeria) Kparobo Arierhi	(Norway) Mjøndalen	Loan return	31 December 2025	
FW	(Norway) Markus Edner Wæhler	(Norway) Mjøndalen	Loan return	31 December 2025	
MF	(Norway) Gustav Nyheim	(Norway) Molde	Free	1 January 2026	
MF	(Kosovo) Ylldren Ibrahimaj	(Norway) HamKam		5 January 2026	
FW	(Sweden) Camil Jebara	(Sweden) IF Elfsborg	~NOK 4 million	10 January 2026	
DF	(Norway) John Kitolano	(Norway) Aalesund		2 March 2026	

=== Out ===
Pos.	Player	Transferred to	Fee	Date	Source
DF	(Norway) Maximilian Mortensen Balatoni	(Norway) Strømmen IF		30 January 2026	
MF	(Nigeria) Uba Charles Nwokoma	(Norway) Aalesund		19 March 2026	
MF	(Norway) Markus Karlsbakk	(Turkey) Çorum	Undisclosed	8 August 2026	

== Pre-season and friendlies ==
The team is scheduled to assemble on 15 June 2026, to travel to Denmark for a six-day training camp, concluding with a friendly match against the Superliga runners-up, Midtjylland.

23 January 2026 Friendly	Lillestrøm (Norway)	1–2	(Norway) Sandefjord

30 January 2026 Friendly	Lillestrøm (Norway)	1–0	(Norway) HamKam

31 January 2026 Friendly	Lillestrøm (Norway)	2–2	(Norway) Fredrikstad

6 February 2026 Friendly	Lillestrøm (Norway)	1–3	(Norway) Stabæk

7 February 2026 Friendly	Lillestrøm (Norway)	7–2	(Norway) KFUM Oslo

13 February 2026 Friendly	Lillestrøm (Norway)	4–4	(Norway) Strømsgodset

17 February 2026 Friendly	Lillestrøm (Norway)	7–1	(Norway) Haugesund

24 February 2026 Friendly	Kongsvinger (Norway)	4–2	(Norway) Lillestrøm

27 February 2026 Friendly	Tromsø (Norway)	0–0	(Norway) Lillestrøm

27 March 2026 Friendly	Örgryte IS (Sweden)	1–0	(Norway) Lillestrøm
	31'

20 June 2026 Friendly	Midtjylland (Denmark)	1–0	(Norway) Lillestrøm	Herning, Denmark
13:00	Iheanacho 77'

26 June 2026 Friendly	Lillestrøm (Norway)	2–3	(Sweden) Degerfors IF	Lillestrøm
12:00	Jebara 5', 15'		31'; 61'; 65'

3 July 2026 Friendly	Lillestrøm (Norway)	3–1	(Norway) Sarpsborg 08	Lillestrøm
12:00	Nyheim 11', 36'; Drammeh 28'		18'

== Competitions ==
=== Overall record ===
Competition	First match	Last match	Starting round	Final position	Record							
Competition	First match	Last match	Starting round	Final position	Pld	W	D	L	GF	GA	GD	Win %
Eliteserien	15 March 2026		Matchday 1		11	6	1	4	17	11	+6	54.55
2025–26 Norwegian Football Cup	7 March 2026	22 March 2026	Fourth round	Quarter-finals	2	1	0	1	2	4	−2	50.00
2026–27 Norwegian Football Cup					0	0	0	0	0	0	+0	—
2026–27 UEFA Europa League	20 August 2026		Play-off round		0	0	0	0	0	0	+0	—
Total					13	7	1	5	19	15	+4	53.85

Source: Competitions

=== Eliteserien ===
Pos	Team	Pld	W	D	L	GF	GA	GD	Pts	Qualification or relegation
4	Molde	21	11	3	7	44	32	+12	36	Qualification for the Conference League second qualifying round
5	Rosenborg	21	10	3	8	39	30	+9	33	
6	Lillestrøm	21	10	2	9	28	29	−1	32	
7	Brann	22	9	2	11	39	34	+5	29	
8	Fredrikstad	21	8	4	9	25	32	−7	28	

Updated to match(es) played on 9 October 2026. Source: Football Association of Norway (in Norwegian)
Rules for classification: 1) Points; 2) Goal difference; 3) Goals scored; 4) Head-to-head points; 5) Head-to-head goal difference; 6) Head-to-head goals scored.

==== Results summary ====
Overall								Home						Away					
Pld	W	D	L	GF	GA	GD	Pts	W	D	L	GF	GA	GD	W	D	L	GF	GA	GD
0	0	0	0	0	0	0	0	0	0	0	0	0	0	0	0	0	0	0	0

==== Results by round ====
Round	1	2	3	4	5	6	7	8	9	10	11	12	13	14	15
Ground	A	H	A	H	A	H	H	A	H	A	H	H	A	H	A
Result	W	L	W	W	W	L	W	L	W	L	P				D
Position															

Updated to match(es) played on May 2026. Source:
A = Away; H = Home; W = Win; D = Draw; L = Loss; P = Postponed

==== Matches ====
The match schedule was issued on 19 December 2025.

15 March 2026 1	Aalesund	1–3	Lillestrøm

6 April 2026 3	Molde	0–1	Lillestrøm

11 April 2026 4	Lillestrøm	3–1	Start

15 April 2026 15	Tromsø	0–0	Lillestrøm

19 April 2026 5	Vålerenga	0–2	Lillestrøm

26 April 2026 6	Lillestrøm	0–2	Bodø/Glimt

3 May 2026 7	Lillestrøm	4–0	Sarpsborg 08

10 May 2026 8	Rosenborg	2–0	Lillestrøm

16 May 2026 9	Lillestrøm	3–1	Sandefjord

20 May 2026 2	Lillestrøm	1–2	Kristiansund

25 May 2026 10	HamKam	2–0	Lillestrøm

30 May 2026 11	Lillestrøm	v	Viking
Note: The match planned for 30 May 2026, was postponed as Viking FK players have been called up for international duty.

=== Norwegian Football Cup ===
==== 2025–26 ====
7 March 2026 Fourth round	HamKam	0–2	Lillestrøm

22 March 2026 Quarter-finals	Bodø/Glimt	4–0	Lillestrøm

==== 2026–27 ====
22–23 August 2026 First round	Aurskog/Finstadbru	v	Lillestrøm

=== 2026–27 UEFA Europa League ===
Pos	Team	Pld	W	D	L	GF	GA	GD	Pts	Qualification
20	(Netherlands) AZ	2	1	0	1	2	2	0	3	Advance to knockout phase play-offs (unseeded)
21	(Austria) Red Bull Salzburg	2	1	0	1	1	4	−3	3	Advance to knockout phase play-offs (unseeded)
22	(Norway) Lillestrøm	2	0	1	1	2	3	−1	1	Advance to knockout phase play-offs (unseeded)
22	(Spain) Real Sociedad	2	0	1	1	2	3	−1	1	Advance to knockout phase play-offs (unseeded)
24	(Israel) Hapoel Be'er Sheva	2	0	1	1	1	2	−1	1	Advance to knockout phase play-offs (unseeded)

Updated to match(es) played on 15 October 2026. Source: UEFA
Rules for classification: League phase tiebreakers

17 September 2026 1	Lillestrøm (Norway)	1–2	(Portugal) Torreense	Lillestrøm
21:00	Gulbrandsen (yellow card) 58'; Olsen 79'		Alfaro 23'; Pozo 49', (yellow card) 51'; Bruno (yellow card) 57'; Jatta (yellow card) 69' (red card) 85'; Jean (yellow card) 71'	Stadium: Åråsen Stadion; Attendance: 6,568; Referee: Ondřej Berka (Czech Republic)

15 October 2026 2	Sparta Prague (Czech Republic)	1–1	(Norway) Lillestrøm	Prague, Czech Republic
18:45	Suchomel (yellow card) 18'; Singhateh (yellow card) 30'; Alcócer 56'; Macek (yellow card) 77'		Nyheim (yellow card) 28'; Olsen 90+1'; Melland (yellow card) 90+3'	Stadium: Stadion Letná; Attendance: 17,024; Referee: Martin Matoša (Slovenia)

22 October 2026 3	Lillestrøm (Norway)	v	(Spain) Real Sociedad	Lillestrøm
21:00				Stadium: Åråsen Stadion
