= Simon Mesfin =

Norwegian footballer and administrator (born 1980)

Personal information
- Full name: Simon Tekeste Mesfin
- Date of birth: 9 June 1980 (age 46)
- Place of birth: Ethiopia

Team information
- Current team: Lillestrøm (director of sports)

Youth career
- Skjetten

Senior career*
Years	Team	Apps	(Gls)
- Skjetten / Romerike
2004	Strømmen		
2004	Drøbak-Frogn		
2004	Skjetten		
2004	Strømmen		
2005–2008	Skjetten		
2009–2011	Sørumsand		
2012–2013	Flisbyen		

Managerial career
- 2009–2011: Sørumsand (assistant manager)
- 2012–2013: Flisbyen
- 2011–2017: Lillestrøm (asst. director of sports)
- LSK Kvinner (sport administrator)
- 2017–: Lillestrøm (director of sports)
- 2023: Lillestrøm (interim)
- * Club domestic league appearances and goals as of 29 March 2019

Simon Mesfin (born 9 June 1980) is a Norwegian football administrator and former player, best known as the director of sports in Lillestrøm SK.

His parents immigrated to Norway from the Ethiopian Province of Eritrea in the 1970s. He came through the youth system and played several seasons for Skjetten SK, including a couple of seasons when the team was monikered Romerike Fotball. In 2004 he moved to Strømmen IF, and also appeared for Drøbak-Frogn IL, then Skjetten, Strømmen for a second time. He rejoined Skjetten for the next season. In 2009 he moved on to Sørumsand IF as playing assistant manager.

In 2011 Mesfin was hired by Lillestrøm SK as an administrative manager, tasked with the integration of foreign and young players, helping them off the field. He was soon upgraded to assist the director of sports, Torgeir Bjarmann. He also aided LSK Kvinner in an administrative role. While this was his daytime job, in 2012–13 he also coached Flisbyen BK in the afternoons.

He did however continue as assisting director of sports in Lillestrøm, and was promoted to director of sports in the summer of 2017.
