= Mahmod Hejazi =

Norwegian footballer (born 1984)

Personal information
- Full name: Mahmod Mohamad Hejazi
- Date of birth: 19 July 1984 (age 42)
- Place of birth: [Saudi Arabia]
- Height: 1.87 m (6 ft 2 in)
- Position: Striker

Team information
- Current team: Rilindja

Youth career
- –2000: Fet IL
- 2001–2002: Lillestrøm

Senior career*
Years	Team	Apps	(Gls)
2003–2004	Lillestrøm	3	(0)
2004	→ Ull/Kisa (loan)		
2005	Väsby United		
2005	Assyriska	5	(2)
2006	FF Jaro		
2007	Lørenskog	??	(13)
2008	Skjetten	14	(7)
2009	Manglerud Star		
2010	Nordstrand		
2011–2012	Flisbyen		
2012–2013	Hasle-Løren		
2013	Oslo City		
2014	Ullern		
2015	Lyn		
2015	Hasle-Løren		
2016–present	Rilindja		
- * Club domestic league appearances and goals

Mahmod Mohamad Hejazi (born 19 July 1984) is a Norwegian football striker.

== Career ==
Hejazi is of Palestinian descent. He started his career in Fet IL, but went to regional greats Lillestrøm SK while still a youth player. In 2003, he was regarded as a great talent. He got three Norwegian Premier League game in 2003, without scoring.

In early 2004 he was loaned out to Ullensaker/Kisa IL. He scored twelve goals in nineteen games. After five months however, he was benched for a game, but did not tolerate this, and the loan contract was terminated. Soon after he was released from Lillestrøm.

After this Hejazi moved abroad. He first tried his luck at Pisa Calcio, then played for FC Väsby United in Sweden, where he saw a good deal of success. He made the list of the top ten players in the league compiled by Aftonbladet. The Palestinian national team expressed interest in his services. He later played for Assyriska FF and Finnish FF Jaro. Ahead of the 2007 season he returned to Norway, signing for Lørenskog IF. In 2008, he played for Skjetten SK.

In 2009, he was reported as having left Skjetten for the United Arab Emirates. He joined Manglerud Star in the summer of 2009, and played briefly for them, before joining Nordstrand IF ahead of the 2010 season. In 2011, he joined Flisbyen BK. After one and a half year he went on to Hasle-Løren IL. In 2014, he moved on to Ullern IF.
