= Harald Hauge =

Norwegian footballer (born 1984)

Personal information
- Date of birth: 12 May 1984 (age 42)
- Position: Defender

Team information
- Current team: Flisbyen

Senior career*
Years	Team	Apps	(Gls)
2003–2005	Lillestrøm	3	(0)
2004	→ Hønefoss (loan)		
2006–2009	Ull/Kisa		
2010–present	Flisbyen		
- * Club domestic league appearances and goals

Harald Hauge (born 12 May 1984) is a Norwegian football defender.

Hauge hails from Frogner, and played youth football for Lillestrøm SK. He got three Norwegian Premier League games in 2003, without scoring. He was given a senior contract with Lillestrøm ahead of the 2004 season. However, before the season actually started, he was loaned out to Hønefoss BK in the Norwegian First Division. A second season on loan was considered, but in January 2005 he was recalled to Lillestrøm. However, he soon became injured.

Ahead of the 2006 season he joined Ull/Kisa . Here he joined his brother Frank Arne Hauge. Ahead of the 2009 season he went on to Flisbyen BK. Frank Arne Hauge became assistant coach.
