= Lillestrøm Stadion =

Building in Skedsmo, Akershus, Norway

Lillestrøm idrettspark
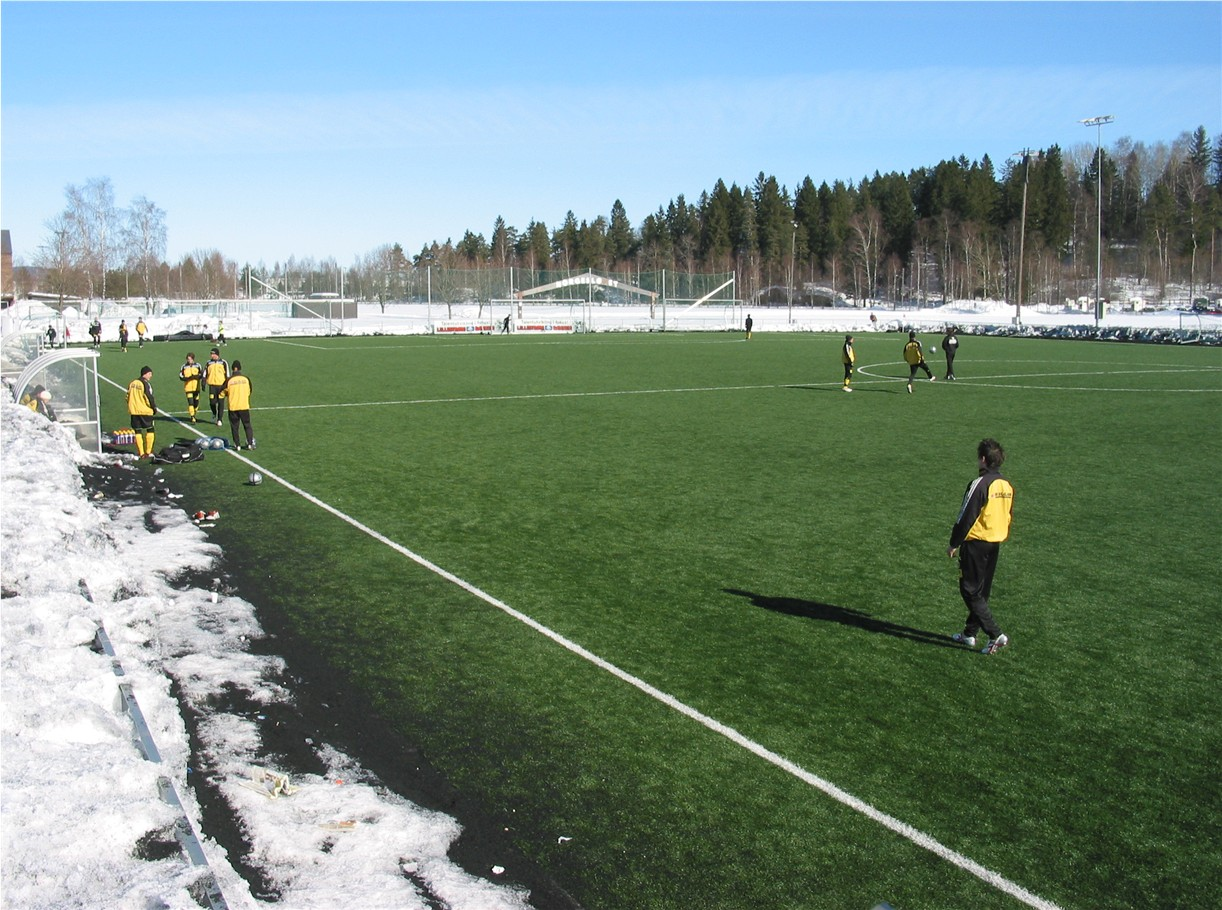
- Lillestrøm SK training session in 2006
- Interactive map of Lillestrøm idrettspark
- Location: Lillestrøm, Skedsmo, Norway
- Coordinates: 59°57′39″N 11°04′06″E
- Capacity: 750 (athletics)
- Field size: 105 × 65 m (115 × 71 yd) (football)

Construction
- Opened: 6 June 1920
- Renovated: 2004, 2007
- Cost: 28 million kr (2007)

Tenants
- Lillestrøm SK (football, training); Flisbyen BK (football); Focus FK (football); Strømmen IF (athletics); Lørenskog FIL (athletics); Minerva IS (athletics); 1952 Winter Olympics (ice hockey)

Lillestrøm idrettspark, colloquially known as Lillestrøm stadion or Vigernes stadion, is a sports facility located at Lillestrøm in Skedsmo, Norway. The main venue is Romerike friidrettsstadion, an athletics stadium with eight all-weather running tracks. It has multiple football pitches, including one with artificial turf and one with gravel. The park features of two arenas, LSK-Hallen with a full-size artificial football pitch and Skedsmohallen for indoor sports. The venue is located adjacent to Åråsen Stadion, the home ground of Lillestrøm SK. The main tenants for Lillestrøm idrettspark are Flisbyen BK and Focus FK in football, and Strømmen IF, Lørenskog FIL and Minerva IS in athletics. The stadium opened on 6 June 1920 and was the main venue for Lillestrøm SK until 1951. The athletics stadium opened two years later. In 2004, the artificial turf pitch was laid and in 2007 a new athletics venue and LSK-Hallen opened.

== History ==
After the old football pitch at Tærudløkka was no longer in use after 1917, it took years before the newly established Lillestrøm SK and the commune would find a solution to the pitch problem. In the Autumn of 1919, it was finally decided that the property at Vigernes would be purchased for the purpose. Many Lillestrøm SK members would put down multiple volunteer work hours to make the gravel pitch ready as soon as they could. The stadium opened on 6 June 1920 and was originally named Lillestrøm kommunale idrettsplass ("Lillestrøm Municipal Sports Place"). Lillestrøm SK was the main football tenant from the opening until 1951 when they opened Åråsen Stadion. The original athletics stadium opened in 1953, located in the same place as the current athletics stadium. Minerva arranged the first tournament on 16 June 1954. Subsequently, a velodrome was installed outside the running track. A municipal grant of 5,000 Norwegian krone (NOK) allowed a steeplechase obstacle to be installed in 1959. A cage for discus throw and hammer throw was installed on the current artificial turf pitch in 1970.

The athletics venue suffered from drainage problems, and from the 1970s it was no longer used for competitions. This forced Minerva IS to hold many of its trainings at Stovner stadion in Oslo and Jessheim stadion in Ullensaker. In 1976, Minerva IS took the initiative to lay an all-weather running track, but the proposal was rejected by the municipality. In 1990, Skedsmo Municipal Council initially voted to allocate NOK 2 million for an all-weather running track, but the funding was reallocated to fix a leaking roof on Skedsmo Church. No further grants were issued for the stadium.

In 2004, Lillestrøm SK took the initiative to convert one of the gravel pitches to artificial turf. The proposal also saw the installation of floodlights and under-soil heating. The new field cost NOK 9 million, which was covered by LSK, betting grants and the municipality. Construction started in August 2004 and was completed in November. The pitch located behind Skedsmohallen was converted to a throwing venue in 2005.

Ahead of the 2003 municipal elections, the Labour Party mayor candidates for the municipalities of Skedsmo, Rælingen and Lørenskog, Andreas Hamnes, Terje Granerud and Åge Tovan, proposed that a central, inter-municipal athletics venue be built for Nedre Romerike. The proposal was followed up by the three athletics clubs in the area, Minerva IS, Strømmen IF and Lørenskog FIL, who established a committee. Several locations were considered, but the committee landed on Lillestrøm idrettspark because of the availability of existing utilities, parking and changing rooms, which would reduce the investment costs. In the process, Strømmen stadion was rejected because it was undergoing upgrades to receive artificial turf and Marikollen was deemed too remote. Also Nordlimyra in Lørenskog was deemed unsuitable. The choice of Lillestrøm idrettspark was selected by consensus among the municipalities and the sports clubs in June 2005.

Grants were issued from the municipalities in 2005, the size of which was determined by the population of each municipality. Multiconsult was hired to design the venue and construction started on 28 June 2006. Earthworks were completed by November and asphalting started on 16 May 2007. The all-weather surface was completed on 13 June and technical installations were completed by mid-August. The new venue was inaugurated on 1 September 2007. It cost NOK 28.6 million, of which NOK 15.9 million were paid for by the municipalities in ratio of their population. The rest was financed through a combination of betting grants, value added tax compensation and volunteer work.

In 2006, the municipality approved Lillestrøm SK's plans to build an indoor football pitch. The hall was inaugurated on 11 October 2007 and cost NOK 62 million. In 2009, Lillestrøm launched itself as one of six candidate cities for Norway's joint bid with Sweden to host the UEFA Euro 2016. This would involve building a new venue seating between 35,000 and 44,000 in Lillestrøm. One of three potential locations was at Lillestrøm idrettspark. The stadium would be built in modules, so the upper tiers could be dismounted after the championship and installed on other venues. The proposal was selected as one of four for the bid, but the bid was never sent.

== Facilities ==
Lillestrøm idrettspark is located across the railway from Åråsen Stadion, the home ground of Lillestrøm SK. It is the main recreational sports complex in Skedsmo, located just north of Lillestrøm. It contains several football pitches, including one with gravel and one with artificial turf. The artificial and two of the natural grass pitches have undersoil heating. LSK-Hallen contains an indoor 105-by-68-meter (115 by 74 yd) artificial turf football pitch with capacity for 3,000 spectators. Skedsmohallen is the main indoor arena in Skedsmo; it is largely used for ball sports, athletics and martial arts, but also sees cultural events such as concerts. Lillestrøm og Omeng Bueskyttere undertakes archery practice behind Skedsmohallen. Also at the park is a driving range and a skateboarding park.

Romerike friidrettsstadion is an inter-municipal athletics venue jointly owned by the municipalities of Skedsmo, Rælingen and Lørenskog. The venue is built to a sufficient standard to host the Norwegian Athletics Championship. It features a 400-meter (1,300 ft) long all-weather surface with eight tracks, permitting 110 meters hurdles on both sides. Both sides have two jumping pits, and two areas for pole vault and two for high jump. Javelin throw is possible from both ends, with undersoil heating in the last part of the approach. The throwing cage permits discus throw and hammer throw, and the area for shot put is heated. The venue is used exclusively for athletics and is constructed such that it cannot be used for football. The athletics field has a spectator capacity of 750, of which 185 can be seated. It has floodlighting at 200 lux and electronic timekeeping equipment, as well as two huts. In addition, a gravel football pitch is used for throwing practice.

== Events ==
Lillestrøm SK uses Lillestrøm idrettspark and LSK-Hallen for training sessions for the elite team and for lower-level matches. The Women's Premier League side LSK Kvinner FK play their home matches in LSK-Hallen. The football grounds are also used by Flisbyen BK and Focus FK in the Third Division. The athletics venue is used by Minerva IS, Lørenskog FIL and Strømmen IF. During the 1952 Winter Olympics, the stadium was one of five rinks used for ice hockey. Three rinks were located outside Oslo in order to spread the games to a wider audience. The single match at Lillestrøm stadion saw Poland beat Finland 4–2 on 23 February. The former velodrome hosted two Norwegian championships. The athletics venue annually hosts Romerikslekene and one of the three Huyndai Grand Prix events. Since 2012 the Norway national football team started using Åråsen and Lillestrøm stadion for training.
