= Joar Hoff =

Norwegian footballer and coach (1939–2019)

Joar Hoff (10 April 1939 – 22 May 2019) was a Norwegian football player and coach.

A midfielder, Hoff played for Bodø/Glimt in 1959, Lillestrøm and Strømmen in 1961, and Vålerenga in 1965.

Hoff coached Lillestrøm in their first two season in the Norwegian First Division, and led the team to victory in the 1976 Norwegian First Division. He also coached Lillestrøm in 1982, when the team finished third in the First Division. Hoff also coached Vålerenga in 1978.

He was the brother of Ivar Hoff.
