= Jubril Adedeji =

English footballer (born 2000)

Personal information
- Full name: Jubril Chukwu-Emeka Adedeji
- Date of birth: 25 May 2000 (age 26)
- Place of birth: Greenford, London, England
- Height: 1.82 m (6 ft 0 in)
- Position: Left winger

Team information
- Current team: AaB
- Number: 7

Youth career
- 2008–2010: Greenford Celtic
- 2010–2018: Watford
- 2018–2019: HB Køge

Senior career*
Years	Team	Apps	(Gls)
2019–2023	HB Køge	106	(20)
2024–	AaB	32	(4)
2025	→ Lillestrøm (loan)	6	(0)
2025	→ Lillestrøm 2 (loan)	3	(5)
- * Club domestic league appearances and goals as of 2 June 2026

Jubril Chukwu-Emeka Adedeji (born 25 May 2000) is an English professional footballer who plays as a left winger for Danish 1st Division club AaB.

== Career ==
=== Youth years ===
Born and raised in Greenford in West London, Adedeji first joined a football club at the age of eight when he joined local club Greenford Celtic FC. Here he played for two years before moving to Watford. He played here from the age of 10 until he was 18.

In 2018 Adedeji left Watford, and was subsequently on trial at Bournemouth.

=== HB Køge ===
Following recommendations from his former Watford teammate Marian Huja, Adedeji ended up moving to Danish 1st Division club HB Køge, where he landed in the fall of 2018, joining the club's U-19 team, but after the turn of 2019 was incorporated into the first team squad. Adedeji made his official debut for HB Køge on 24 March 2019, in a league match against Hvidovre IF. After a first season that ended with five league appearances, Adedeji's contract was extended in June 2019 until June 2020.

In the 2019–20 season Adedeji became an important figure in the Køge team and ended the season with 29 games and 4 goals. In the summer of 2020, his contract was further extended, this time until the end of 2022. After 26 league games in the 2020–21 season, he suffered a knee injury after partially tearing some ligaments. He was back after a month and a half. In August 2021, Adedeji suffered an ACL injury that ended up keeping him out for the rest of the 2021–22 season. He ended up signing a contract extension in January 2022 until the end of 2024. He made his comeback in May 2024 in a league match against Fremad Amager.

After 116 official matches with 20 goals and 16 assists for Køge, it was confirmed at the end of December 2023 that Adedeji had chosen to leave the club at the end of his contract.

=== AaB ===
On 7 December 2023, it was confirmed that Adedeji moved to the Danish 1st Division club AaB from the turn of the year, signing a deal until June 2027. Adedeji made his debut on 24 February 2024, against SønderjyskE. Making 12 appearances in his debut season, scoring one goal and three assists, he helped his new club gain promotion to the 2024-25 Danish Superliga.

On 19 March 2025, Adedeji was loaned out to newly relegated Norwegian First Division club Lillestrøm SK until the end of the year. He returned to AaB at the end of the loan spell.
