= Torgeir Bjarmann =

Norwegian footballer (born 1968)

Personal information
- Date of birth: 24 June 1968 (age 58)
- Place of birth: Norway
- Height: 1.83 m (6 ft 0 in)
- Position: Central defender

Youth career
- Skedsmo

Senior career*
Years	Team	Apps	(Gls)
1988–2003	Lillestrøm	306	(37)
2000	→ LASK Linz (loan)	3	(1)
2004	Lørenskog	0	(0)
2004–2005	Lillestrøm 2		
2008–2009	Skedsmo		
2010–present	Flisbyen		
- * Club domestic league appearances and goals

Torgeir Bjarmann (born 24 June 1968) is a former Norwegian football defender.

== Playing career ==
Bjarmann played for Lillestrøm SK throughout his professional career, except for a short loan period in Austrian football when he teamed up alongside compatriot Geir Frigård. His 306 Norwegian Premier League matches is a Lillestrøm club record; so are his 564 games in all competitions. He was never capped for Norway.

Bjarmann was a rough but fair centre back. He won the Kniksen award as defender of the year in 2001. Bjarmann retired after the 2003 season, but made some appearances in the lower leagues, mostly for the B and C teams of Lillestrøm SK.

In late 2007 it was announced that he will play occasionally for Skedsmo FK in the 2008 season. In 2010 it was announced that he had transferred to Flisbyen BK.

=== Honours ===
- Kniksen award as defender of the year 2001

== Non-playing career ==
Off the field he worked for some time as a commentator in the Norwegian Broadcasting Corporation football show, "4-4-2". Autumn 2005, Bjarmann was hired as sport director in FC Lyn Oslo. He stayed with FC Lyn until September 2008, before being appointed Director of Football at Lillestrøm SK.
