= Flisbyen BK =

Norwegian football club based in Lillestrøm

Flisbyen
- Full name: Flisbyen Ballklubb
- Founded: 1991
- Ground: Lillestrøm stadion, Lillestrøm
- League: Fourth Division
- 2011: Third Division/ 3, 14th (relegated)
Home colours	Away colours

Flisbyen Ballklubb is a Norwegian football club from Lillestrøm. It was founded in 1991.

The men's team currently resides in the Fourth Division, the fifth tier of Norwegian football. In 2011, they played in the Third Division. In 2010 and 2011, the club contracted several former players of Lillestrøm SK and Skjetten SK, such as Torgeir Bjarmann, Harald Hauge, Thomas Bjerk, Marius Gullerud and Mahmod Hejazi.
