= Eric Kitolano =

Norwegian footballer (born 1997)

Personal information
- Full name: Eric Bugale Kitolano
- Date of birth: 2 September 1997 (age 29)
- Place of birth: Uvira, DR Congo
- Height: 1.75 m (5 ft 9 in)
- Position: Midfielder

Team information
- Current team: Lillestrøm
- Number: 17

Youth career
- –2013: Gulset
- 2014–2016: Odd

Senior career*
Years	Team	Apps	(Gls)
2013	Gulset	12	(3)
2016	Odd	0	(0)
2017	Notodden	21	(4)
2018–2019	Ull/Kisa	60	(6)
2020–2022	Tromsø	85	(28)
2023–2024	Molde	23	(4)
2024–	Lillestrøm	58	(17)

International career^{‡}
2015	Norway U18	10	(0)
- * Club domestic league appearances and goals as of 23 July 2026 ‡ National team caps and goals as of 9 May 2021

Eric Bugale Kitolano (born 2 September 1997) is a professional footballer who plays as a midfielder for Lillestrøm. Born in DR Congo, he represented Norway at youth level.

== Career ==
Kitolano started his career in Gulset IF, playing on the senior team on the sixth tier before joining the junior team of Odd in 2014. He made his senior debut for Odd in the 2016 Norwegian Cup, with two cup games against Tollnes and Tønsberg. However he was shipped out to Notodden, and Ull/Kisa in 2018.

In 2020 Kitolano joined Tromsø, helped win promotion from the 2020 1. divisjon by scoring double digits, and made his Eliteserien debut in May 2021 against Bodø/Glimt.

On 6 January 2023, Kitolano signed for Molde on a three-year contract.

After only one season at Molde, in February 2024, Kitolano moved to Lillestrøm on a three-year contract.

== Personal life ==
He is the older brother of fellow footballers John and Joshua Kitolano.

== Career statistics ==
=== Club ===
As of 23 July 2026

Appearances and goals by club, season and competition
Club	Season	League			National cup		Europe		Other		Total	
Club	Season	Division	Apps	Goals	Apps	Goals	Apps	Goals	Apps	Goals	Apps	Goals
Gulset	2013	5. divisjon	12	3	0	0	—		—		12	3
Odd	2016	Eliteserien	0	0	2	0	—		—		2	0
Notodden	2017	2. divisjon	21	4	3	0	—		4 (Note: Appearances in 2. divisjon promotional play-offs)	0	28	4
Ullensaker/Kisa	2018	1. divisjon	30	2	3	1	—		1 (Note: Appearance in Eliteserien play-offs)	0	34	3
Ullensaker/Kisa	2019	1. divisjon	30	4	2	1	—		—		32	5
Ullensaker/Kisa	Total		60	6	5	2	0	0	1	0	66	8
Tromsø	2020	1. divisjon	28	11	—		—		—		28	11
Tromsø	2021	Eliteserien	28	4	2	0	—		—		30	4
Tromsø	2022	Eliteserien	29	13	3	3	—		—		32	16
Tromsø	Total		85	28	5	3	0	0	0	0	90	31
Molde	2023	Eliteserien	23	4	7	2	9 (Note: Four appearances in UEFA Champions League and five appearances and one goal in UEFA Europa League)	1	—		39	7
Molde	2024	Eliteserien	0	0	0	0	2 (Note: Appearances in UEFA Europa Conference League)	0	—		2	0
Molde	Total		23	4	7	2	11	1	—		41	7
Lillestrøm	2024	Eliteserien	24	3	4	1	—		—		28	4
Lillestrøm	2025	1. divisjon	29	14	8	1	—		—		37	15
Lillestrøm	2026	Eliteserien	5	0	2	0	—		—		7	0
Lillestrøm	Total		58	17	14	2	0	0	0	0	72	19
Career total			259	62	36	9	11	1	5	0	311	72

== Honours ==
Tromsø

- Norwegian First Division: 2020

Molde

- Norwegian Cup: 2023

Individual

- Norwegian First Division Player of the Month: October 2025
