= Gustav Nyheim =

Norwegian footballer (born 2006)

Personal information
- Full name: Gustav Kjølstad Nyheim
- Date of birth: 13 February 2006 (age 20)
- Place of birth: Norway
- Height: 1.88 m (6 ft 2 in)
- Position: Forward

Team information
- Current team: Lillestrøm
- Number: 14

Youth career
- –2023: Molde

Senior career*
Years	Team	Apps	(Gls)
2023–2025	Molde	13	(0)
2026–	Lillestrøm	14	(4)

International career^{‡}
2021	Norway U15	6	(2)
2022	Norway U16	7	(1)
2023	Norway U17	11	(3)
2024–	Norway U18	3	(0)
- * Club domestic league appearances and goals as of 23 July 2026 ‡ National team caps and goals as of 5 September 2024

Gustav Kjølstad Nyheim (born 13 February 2006) is a Norwegian footballer who plays as a forward for Lillestrøm.

== Career ==
On 25 July 2021, Nyheim made his debut for Molde in the cup, coming on as a 74th-minute substitute for Fredrik Aursnes.

On 29 November 2025, Molde announced that Nyheim had decided not to renew his contract, which expires at the end of the season, and would leave the club to sign for Lillestrøm, with the newly promoted club announcing that he had signed a four-year contract.

== Career statistics ==
=== Club ===
As of match played 23 July 2026.

Club	Season	League			National cup		Europe		Total	
Club	Season	Division	Apps	Goals	Apps	Goals	Apps	Goals	Apps	Goals
Molde	2021	Eliteserien	0	0	1	0	—		1	0
Molde	2022	Eliteserien	0	0	0	0	—		0	0
Molde	2023	Eliteserien	4	0	2	0	1 (Note: Appearance in UEFA Europa League)	0	7	0
Molde	2024	Eliteserien	5	0	1	1	3 (Note: 2 Appearances in the UEFA Europa Conference League and one appearance in the UEFA Europa League)	0	9	1
Molde	2025	Eliteserien	4	0	0	0	1 (Note: Appearance in UEFA Europa Conference League)	0	5	0
Molde	Total	Eliteserien	13	0	4	1	5	0	22	1
Lillestrøm	2026	14	4	2	0	—		16	4	
Career total			27	4	6	1	5	0	38	5
