= Marius Gullerud =

Norwegian footballer (born 1977)

Personal information
- Full name: Marius Asak Gullerud
- Date of birth: 20 February 1977 (age 49)
- Place of birth: Lørenskog, Norway
- Height: 1.76 m (5 ft 9 1/2 in)
- Position: Midfielder

Team information
- Current team: Flisbyen

Youth career
- Skjetten

Senior career*
Years	Team	Apps	(Gls)
- Skjetten
1997–2001	Kongsvinger	112	(26)
2002–2010	Ham-Kam	175	
2011–present	Flisbyen		
- * Club domestic league appearances and goals

Marius Asak Gullerud (born 20 February 1977) is a Norwegian football midfielder.

He started his career in Skjetten SK and joined Kongsvinger IL ahead of the 1997 season. After 112 league games for the club, he went on to Hamarkameratene in 2002. In 2011, he joined fourth-tier club Flisbyen BK.

He is now become a teacher
