= Emmanuel Mensah =

Emmanuel Mensah may refer to:

- Emmanuel Mensah (footballer) (born 1994), Ghanaian footballer
- Emmanuel Mensah (soldier) (c. 1991–2017), American firefighter and soldier
- E. T. Mensah (Emmanuel Tettey Mensah; 1919–1996), Ghanaian musician
- Emmanuel Obeng Mensah (born 1934), Ghanaian politician
