= Andreas Hamnes =

Norwegian politician (born 1941)

Andreas Hamnes (born 21 August 1941) is a Norwegian politician for the Labour Party.

He served as a deputy representative to the Norwegian Parliament from Akershus during the term 2005–2009.

He was mayor of Skedsmo from 1991 to 2006. He was forced to resign following the Nedre Romerike Vannverk scandal.
