= Harald Woxen =

Norwegian footballer (born 2008)

Personal information
- Date of birth: 1 February 2008 (age 18)
- Position: Midfielder

Team information
- Current team: Lillestrøm
- Number: 6

Youth career
- 2012–2019: Hakadal
- 2020–2022: Fjellhamar
- 2022–2024: Lillestrøm

Senior career*
Years	Team	Apps	(Gls)
2023–	Lillestrøm 2	36	(11)
2024–	Lillestrøm	27	(4)

International career^{‡}
2024	Norway U16	10	(4)
2025–	Norway U17	9	(0)
2025–	Norway U18	3	(0)
- * Club domestic league appearances and goals as of 23 July 2026 ‡ National team caps and goals as of 29 October 2025

Harald Woxen (born 1 February 2008) is a Norwegian footballer who plays as a midfielder for Lillestrøm.

== Career ==
Hailing from Hakadal, he played for local club Hakadal until the start of 2020, then for Fjellhamar in Lørenskog. After he was selected for Norway's pre-national team training camp in Porsgrunn at the age of 14, he moved to the region's largest team, Lillestrøm. He made his youth international debut for Norway U16 in 2024. (Note: Harald Woxen at the Norwegian Football Federation (in Norwegian))

Lillestrøm used him during the 2025 pre-season, and drafted him into the senior squad at the threshold of the 2025 campaign. Lillestrøm played better and better, and went undefeated through the first 25 games. In late September 2025, Lillestrøm secured promotion to the 2026 Eliteserien, as Woxen both scored and made an assist in a 5–1 routing of Moss. Woxen also scored as Lillestrøm advanced in the 2025–26 Norwegian Football Cup. By the second half of 2025, Woxen was considered Lillestrøm's greatest talent.

== Career statistics ==
As of 29 October 2025

Appearances and goals by club, season and competition
Club	Season	League			National Cup		Total	
Club	Season	Division	Apps	Goals	Apps	Goals	Apps	Goals
Lillestrøm 2	2023	3. divisjon	5	1	—		5	1
Lillestrøm 2	2024	3. divisjon	20	5	—		20	5
Lillestrøm 2	2023	3. divisjon	9	4	—		9	4
Lillestrøm 2	Total		34	10	—		34	10
Lillestrøm	2024	Eliteserien	1	0	0	0	1	0
Lillestrøm	2025	1. divisjon	18	4	5	3	23	7
Lillestrøm	Total		19	4	5	3	24	7
Career total			53	14	5	3	58	17

== Honours ==
Individual

- Norwegian First Division Young Player of the Month: August 2025

Team Norwegian First Division: 2025
