= Frederik Elkær =

Danish footballer (born 2001)

Personal information
- Full name: Frederik Elkær
- Date of birth: 11 December 2001 (age 24)
- Place of birth: Viborg, Denmark
- Position: Left-back

Team information
- Current team: Lillestrøm
- Number: 11

Youth career
- Viborg
- 2018: Silkeborg
- 2019: Viborg
- 2019–2021: Hobro

Senior career*
Years	Team	Apps	(Gls)
2020–2023	Hobro	53	(7)
2023–	Lillestrøm	47	(5)
- * Club domestic league appearances and goals as of 23 July 2026

Frederik Elkær (born 11 December 2001) is a Danish professional footballer, who plays as a left-back for Norwegian Eliteserien side Lillestrøm SK.

== Club career ==
=== Hobro IK ===
Elkær joined Hobro IK in the summer 2019. On 8 July 2020, Elkær got his official debut for Hobro in the Danish Superliga against AC Horsens. He played all 90 minutes of the game and became the youngest Danish Superliga debutant in the history of Hobro IK.

=== Lillestrøm ===
On 31 August 2023, Elkær was sold to Norwegian Elitserien side Lillestrøm, with the player signing until the end of 2026.
