= Linus Alperud =

Swedish footballer (born 2005)

Personal information
- Date of birth: 15 October 2005 (age 21)
- Height: 1.76 m (5 ft 9 in)
- Position: Midfielder

Team information
- Current team: Lillestrøm
- Number: 7

Youth career
- Adolfsbergs IK
- –2020: Karlslunds IF FK
- 2021–2023: Örebro SK

Senior career*
Years	Team	Apps	(Gls)
2024–2025	Örebro SK	15	(3)
2025–	Lillestrøm SK	17	(2)
- * Club domestic league appearances and goals as of 23 July 2026

Linus Alperud (born 15 October 2005) is a Swedish footballer who plays as a midfielder for Lillestrøm SK.

Starting his youth career in Adolfsbergs IK, he also played for Karlslunds IF FK before joining Örebro SK in 2021. Ahead of the 2024 season he was drafted into the senior squad, but was mostly injured. He made his senior debut in 2024, playing one single match before becoming a regular in the 2025 Superettan campaign.

With his contract lasting until the end of 2026, there was tangible interest already in the summer of 2025, as Örebro languished in the table. All the six highest-placed clubs in the Allsvenskan were said to be interested: AIK, Elfsborg, IFK Göteborg, Hammarby, Malmö and Mjällby. Örebro also rejected a number of transfer bids. After Swedish media reported further interest from Rosenborg in Norway, Alperud was bought by Lillestrøm SK of Norway in July 2025, in a transfer reportedly worth 5 million kr. He scored his first goal against Raufoss in July, the decisive goal in a 2–1 victory. In late 2025, he spent time on the sidelines again following another injury.

== Honours ==
Norwegian First Division: 2025
