= Ólafur Guðmundsson (footballer) =

Icelandic footballer (born 2002)

Personal information
- Date of birth: 18 March 2002 (age 24)
- Place of birth: Kopavogur, Iceland
- Height: 1.88 m (6 ft 2 in)
- Positions: Centre-back; left-back; central midfielder

Team information
- Current team: Aalesund
- Number: 3

Youth career
- –2019: Breiðablik

Senior career*
Years	Team	Apps	(Gls)
2020–2021	Breiðablik	0	(0)
2020	→ Keflavík (loan)		
2021	→ Grindavík (loan)		
2021–2024	FH	81	(7)
2025–	Aalesund	33	(2)

International career
	Iceland U18	6	(0)
	Iceland U19	2	(0)
	Iceland U21	13	(0)
- * Club domestic league appearances and goals as of 15 August 2026

Ólafur Guðmundsson (born 18 March 2002) is an Icelandic footballer who plays as a defender or midfielder for Aalesunds FK.

== Career ==
From Breiðablik, he was loaned out to Keflavík ÍF in 2020 and in 2021 he went on loan to Grindavík. He also received 21 youth international caps from Iceland U18 through Iceland U21.

In the summer of 2021, he changed from Breiðablik to FH. Ólafur promptly made his Úrvalsdeild debut in July 2021 in a 10 victory over Fylkir. In 2025 he joined Norwegian First Division side Aalesunds FK.

While 2025 was described as "frustrating" for Ólafur personally, the team won promotion to the 2026 Eliteserien via playoff. The team also reached the semi-final of the 2025–26 cup. Ólafur was repurposed from a central defender into a central midfielder.
