= Salieu Drammeh =

Gambian footballer (born 2003)

Personal information
- Date of birth: 28 March 2003 (age 23)
- Place of birth: The Gambia
- Height: 1.75 m (5 ft 9 in)
- Position: Winger

Team information
- Current team: Standard Liège
- Number: 15

Youth career
- 2018–2020: Brøndby
- 2020–2021: Hellerup
- 2021–2022: Vejle

Senior career*
Years	Team	Apps	(Gls)
2022–2024	BK Frem		
2025–2026	Lillestrøm	42	(12)
2026–	Standard Liège	0	(0)

International career^{‡}
2026–	The Gambia	1	(0)
- * Club domestic league appearances and goals as of 16 July 2026 ‡ National team caps and goals as of 15:08, 1 June 2026 (UTC)

Salieu Drammeh (born 28 March 2003) is a Gambian professional footballer who plays as a winger for Belgian Pro League club Standard Liège and the Gambia national team.

== Career ==
During his youth Drammeh played in the academies of a handful of Danish clubs including Brøndby, Hellerup, Vejle and BK Frem, after moving from The Gambia to Denmark at the age of 13. During his time at Brondby he won a number of youth cups.

On 2 August 2022, Drammeh made his professional debut for Danish side BK Frem aged 19, scoring one minute after coming on as a 76th-minute substitute against Såby in the Danish Cup. During his first season with the club, Drammeh made 19 appearances, scoring four times. In July 2023, Drammeh was rewarded with a new contract at BK Frem. During his time with the club he helped earn them promotion to the Danish 2nd Division with 11 goals in 31 matches in the 2023–24 season.

On 11 December 2024, Norwegian club Lillestrøm announced Drammeh had joined the club, signing a three-year contract, effective from 1 January 2025.

On 15 July 2026, Standard Liège in Belgium signed a three-year contract with Drammeh.

== International career ==
Drammeh was called up to the national team of The Gambia for a friendly against Iran on 29 May 2026.

== Personal life ==
Drammeh also has a presence on social media with over 200,000 followers on TikTok.

== Honours ==
Lillestrøm

- Norwegian First Division: 2025
