= Camil Jebara =

Swedish footballer (born 2002)

Personal information
- Full name: Camil Abdelhakim Jebara
- Date of birth: 19 January 2003 (age 23)
- Place of birth: Tayibe, Israel
- Height: 1.83 m (6 ft 0 in)
- Position: Winger

Team information
- Current team: Lillestrøm
- Number: 19

Youth career
- –2019: Maccabi Tel Aviv
- 2019–2021: Landskrona BoIS

Senior career*
Years	Team	Apps	(Gls)
2021–2023	Landskrona BoIS	38	(5)
2023–2026	IF Elfsborg	13	(0)
2024	→ Västerås SK (loan)	8	(0)
2025	→ Kalmar FF (loan)	27	(2)
2026–	Lillestrøm	11	(1)

International career
2023	Sweden U20	3	(0)
2023	Sweden U21	1	(0)
- * Club domestic league appearances and goals as of 23 July 2026

Camil Jebara (born 19 January 2003) is a footballer who plays as a right winger for Eliteserien side Lillestrøm. Born in Israel, he represented Sweden at youth level.

== Personal life ==
Jebara grew up in the Arab Israeli city of Tayibe, a son of a Palestinian father and Swedish mother. He used to visit his mother's family in Lund, Sweden "at least two months a year". He belonged to the academy of Maccabi Tel Aviv, but when it was time to enrol in secondary school, he opted to move to Lund and attend a football school in Landskrona. He also joined the local team Landskrona BoIS, and advanced through its U17, U19 and U21 teams.

== Career ==
Jebara made his senior debut for Landskrona BoIS in the Superettan in September 2021. He played regularly in 2022, and in 2023 he made his international debut for Sweden U20 and Sweden U21. In 2023 he was sought after by several Allsvenskan clubs. IFK Göteborg reportedly made a transfer bid in June 2023, but Jebara signed for IF Elfsborg.

After one year in Elfsborg, Jebara had played a dozen games, but not started a single one. At that time, Elfsborg's manager left for elsewhere and was replaced by Oscar Hiljemark, who stated that Jebara was likely to make his first start. It came on 14 July, in an away victory over Häcken. As a further breakthrough still was not on the books, Jebara was loaned out to struggling Allsvenskan team Västerås SK from September 2024 to the end of the year. Västerås suffered relegation, but Jebara described the loan as "rewarding".

On 26 March 2025, Jebara was loaned out once again, joining Superettan club Kalmar FF on a deal for the remainder of the season.

In January 2026, Jebara joined Norwegian side Lillestrøm SK on a four-year contract.
