= Hans Erik Ødegaard =

Norwegian footballer (born 1974)

Personal information
- Date of birth: 20 January 1974 (age 52)
- Place of birth: Drammen, Norway
- Height: 1.80 m (5 ft 11 in)
- Position: Central midfielder

Team information
- Current team: Lillestrøm (manager)

Senior career*
Years	Team	Apps	(Gls)
1993–2003	Strømsgodset	189	(41)
2004–2006	Sandefjord	58	(15)
Total		247	(56)

Managerial career
- 2009–2015: Mjøndalen (assistant)
- 2015–2017: Real Madrid (youth)
- 2018: Mjøndalen (youth)
- 2019-2020: Strømsgodset (youth)
- 2021–2024: Sandefjord
- 2024–: Lillestrøm
- * Club domestic league appearances and goals

Hans Erik Ødegaard (born 20 January 1974) is a Norwegian football coach and former player who is the head coach of Lillestrøm. Having played for both Strømsgodset and Sandefjord in his career, he later worked as an assistant for Mjøndalen, before becoming the head coach of Sandefjord together with Andreas Tegström.

== Career ==
In his senior career, he played for Strømsgodset from 1993 to 2003 (making 241 league and cup appearances, scoring 52 goals), and Sandefjord from 2004 to 2006 (making 75 league and cup appearances, scoring 22 goals). He played for both clubs in the Tippeligaen and in the Norwegian First Division.

== Coaching career ==
=== Mjøndalen ===
After retiring, Ødegaard became the assistant manager for Mjøndalen IF in 2009, under manager Vegard Hansen.

Mjøndalen qualified for the promotion play-off tournament three times, finally winning promotion in 2014.

=== Real Madrid ===
He became a Real Madrid youth coach on 22 January 2015, signing a three-and-a-half-year contract as a youth coach when his son, Martin Ødegaard signed a contract with the club. Hans Erik Ødegaard received an annual salary of 100,000 euros from Real Madrid for work with the children. In addition, the club secured him a premium of three million euros, according to the contract payable 30 days after signing. Converted to the contract equivalent to 957,143 euros per season. By comparison, Zinedine Zidane, who was head coach of Real Madrid's U23 at the time, cashed 600,000 euros a year for this job.

=== Sandefjord ===
In December 2021 Sandefjord announced the signing of Ødegaard and Andreas Tegström as co-head coaches for the club after the previous coach Martí Cifuentes had left the club. Originally on a two year conctract with an option for another year, the duo extended their contracts in 2022, after a run of eight winless games, running through the 2025 season.

=== Lillestrøm ===
After four seasons at Sandefjord, Ødegaard moved to newly relegated Lillestrøm to become their new head coach.

== Personal life ==
Ødegaard is the father of professional footballer Martin Ødegaard, who plays as a midfielder for and captains both Premier League club Arsenal and the Norway national team.

== Career statistics ==
As of 15 October 2014

Club	Season	Division	League		Cup		Total	
Club	Season	Division	Apps	Goals	Apps	Goals	Apps	Goals
Strømsgodset	1994	Tippeligaen	7	1			7	1
Strømsgodset	1995	1. Divisjon	16	5			16	5
Strømsgodset	1996	Tippeligaen	24	6			24	6
Strømsgodset	1997	Tippeligaen	20	3			20	3
Strømsgodset	1998	Tippeligaen	16	1			16	1
Strømsgodset	1999	Tippeligaen	25	2			25	2
Strømsgodset	2000	1. Divisjon	26	9			26	9
Strømsgodset	2001	Tippeligaen	24	5	3	0	27	5
Strømsgodset	2002	1. Divisjon	27	9	3	1	30	10
Strømsgodset	2003	1. Divisjon	4	0	1	1	5	1
Strømsgodset	Total		189	41	7	2	196	43
Sandefjord	2004	1. Divisjon	28	9	5	6	33	15
Sandefjord	2005	1. Divisjon	25	6	0	0	25	6
Sandefjord	2006	Tippeligaen	5	0	1	0	6	0
Sandefjord	Total		58	15	6	6	64	21
Career Total			247	56	13	8	260	64

== Managerial statistics ==
As of match played 22 November 2026

Managerial record by team and tenure
Team	From	To	Record					Ref.
Team	From	To	P	W	D	L	Win %	Ref.
Sandefjord (with Andreas Tegström)	30 December 2020	10 December 2024	131	39	26	66	29.77	
Lillestrøm	10 December 2024	present	78	54	11	13	69.23	
Total			209	93	37	79	44.50	—

== Honours ==
Lillestrøm

- Norwegian Football Cup: 2025

Individual

- Norwegian First Division Coach of the Month: May 2025 August 2025
- Norwegian First Division Coach of the Year: 2025
