= Åråsen Stadion =

Football stadium in Norway

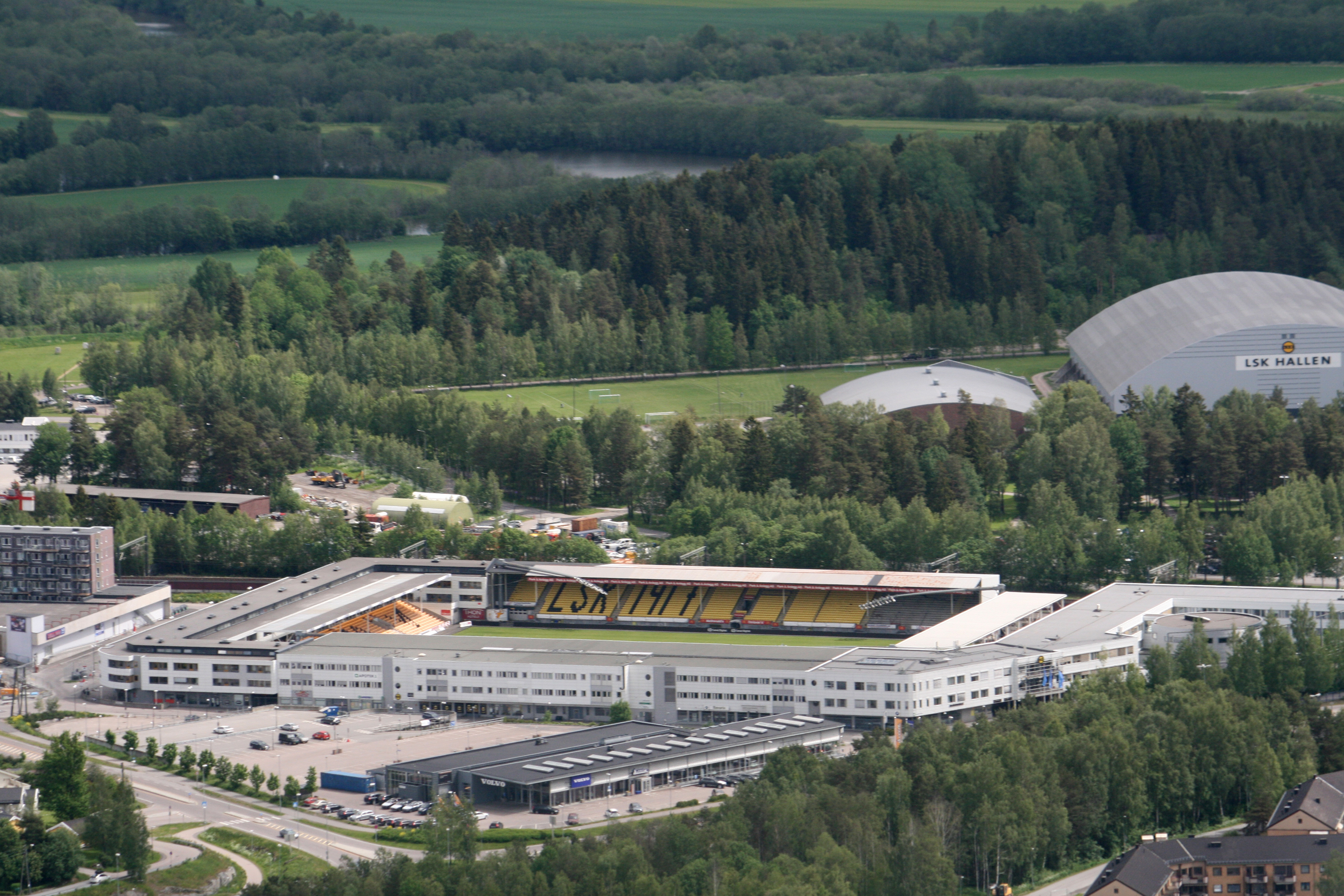
- The West Stand
- Interactive map of Åråsen Stadion
- Location: Lillestrøm, Skedsmo, Norway
- Coordinates: 59°57′46″N 11°03′49″E
- Owner: Lillestrøm SK
- Operator: Åråsen Stadion AS
- Capacity: 10,540
- Surface: Natural grass
- Record attendance: 13,652
- Field size: 105 × 68 m (115 × 74 yd)

Construction
- Groundbreaking: 1950
- Opened: 7 July 1951
- Renovated: 1968
- Expanded: 1974, 1978, 1999–02
- Cost: NOK 300 000 (1950–51); NOK 300 million (1999–2002)

Tenant
- Lillestrøm SK

The Åråsen Stadion, officially written Åråsen stadion, is an all-seater football stadium located in Lillestrøm, a town east of Oslo. With a capacity of 10,540 spectators, the venue is the home of the 1. division side Lillestrøm SK (LSK). The stadium has four stands, of which the West Stand has luxury boxes and club seating for 700. Because of the stadium's proximity to Kjeller Airport, it has retractable floodlights. The record attendance of 13,652 dates from 2002. In addition to league, cup and UEFA Cup matches for LSK, the venue has been used for one Strømmen IF top-league match in 1986, the UEFA Women's Euro 1997, eight other Norway women's national football team matches, the 2002 UEFA European Under-19 Football Championship, and seven Norway national under-21 football team matches.

LSK started purchasing land for their own stadium in 1947, having previously played at Lillestrøm Stadion. Construction started in 1950 and Åråsen opened on 7 July 1951, having cost 150,000 Norwegian kroner (NOK). The grandstand was supplemented with a second stand in 1960. On 7 April 1967, the stadium burned down, but was rebuilt by September 1968. Another stand opened on the east side in 1974, the same year as LSK was promoted to the 1. divisjon, then the highest division of Norwegian football. The East Stand was moved to the north side and a new 3,700-seat stand was built on the east side in 1978, which remains today. Between 1999 and 2002, the other three sides were redeveloped, costing NOK 240 million. This included luxury boxes, a new pitch with under-soil heating, three grandstands, and adjacent commercial and residential property.

== History ==
Lillestrøm SK originally used Jenseberg Stadion in Strømmen for their matches, as there was no suitable stadium in Lillestrøm. On 6 June 1920, the municipality opened Lillestrøm Stadion, where Lillestrøm SK moved their matches. In 1930, the club started working on plans for their own stadium. Led by the chairman Erling Nicolaysen, a stadium fund was established, which grew to NOK 200. However, during the Second World War, the club's funds were eradicated.

On 2 June 1947, the club's board appointed a committee to work on the stadium issue. They determined that the area Sørumsbrenna, part of a farm belonging to Knut Sørum, was the ideal location, despite it being fallow and scrub on a marsh. Holthe og Ahlsen made plans for developing the 4.5-hectare (11-acre) lot. The purchase was approved by the club's annual meeting on 29 September. Additional land was bought in 1948 and 1950, raising the area to 7.2 hectares (18 acres).

Construction was mostly done by volunteers; the building of the stadium required 31,000 man-hours of volunteer work and cost NOK 150,000. After the land was cleared, a layer of mixed sand and earth was laid. The pitch, with dimensions 108 by 68 meters (118 by 74 yd), was sown in mid-1950. The work also included a grandstand, changing rooms, a watering system and kiosks. The stand could accommodate 2,500 spectators, and the stadium had a total permitted capacity of 6,000 people. The inaugural match was played against Sarpsborg on 7 July 1951 in front of 3,500 spectators. A training pitch beside the stadium pitch opened in 1953. The following year, a new steel entrance was built, followed in 1955 by a referees' changing room and administrative offices. In 1959, after eight years of planning, construction of an additional terrace started, which opened in 1960.

On 7 April 1967, the grandstand caught fire and the entire structure burned down beyond repair. The buildings and stands were subsequently demolished. At the same time, the Norwegian Public Roads Administration proposed that the Fetveien road, which runs to the south of the stadium, should be moved to run through the stadium, which would have required the stadium to be moved. However, the Public Roads Administration abandoned their plans and a building permit was issued. New changing rooms, clubhouse and terraces were completed in September 1968.

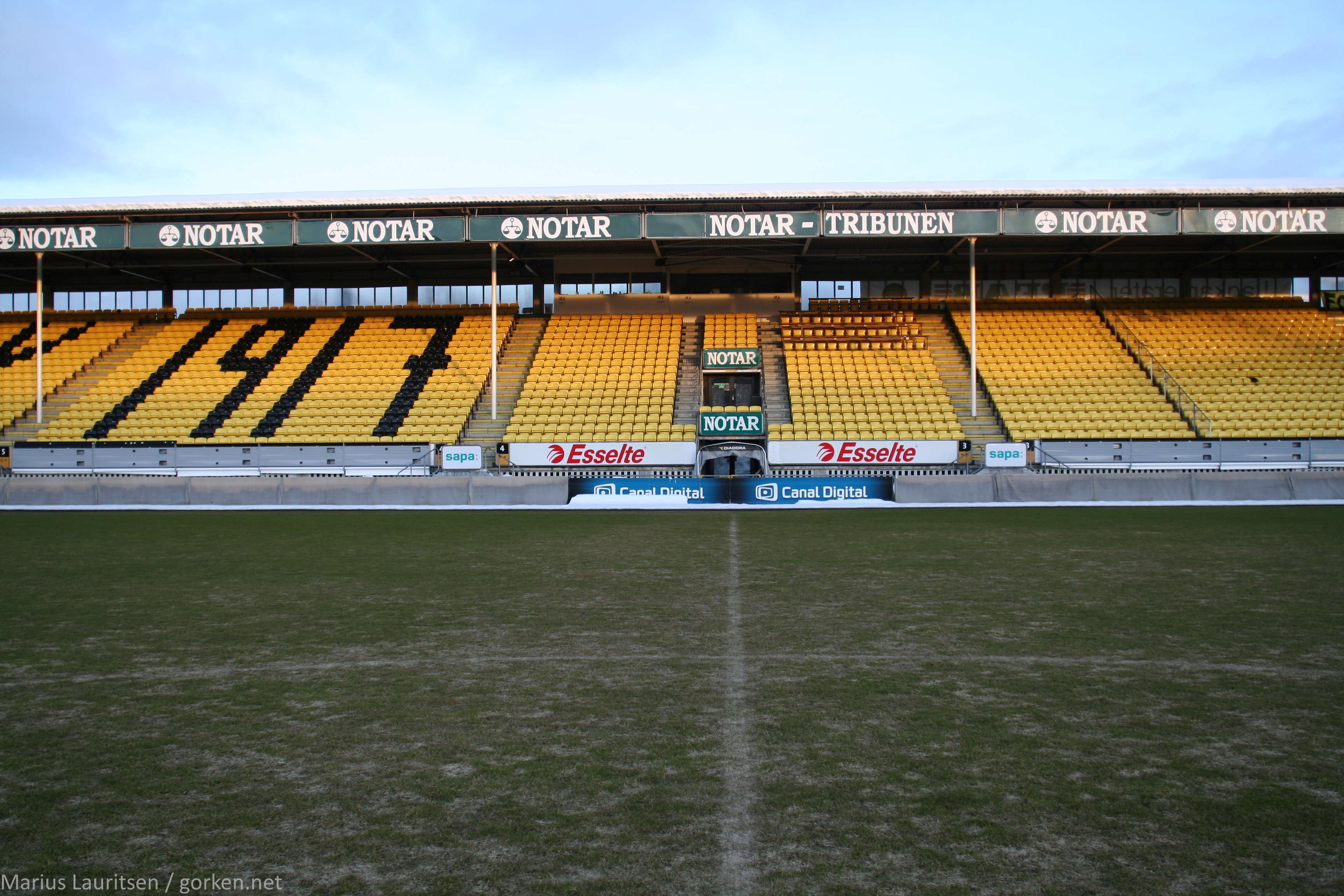
The East Stand is the oldest remaining part of the stadium, having been opened in 1978

To accommodate increasing interest in the club following good results during the early 1970s, the board approved a new grandstand on the east long side. Construction started in late 1973, with the stand covering two-thirds of the length of the pitch, and opened ahead of the 1974 season with a capacity for 1,056 spectators. The clubhouse was expanded to 200 square meters (2,200 sq ft). In 1974, the club won promotion to the First Division, and the new grandstand was extended by 352 seats. On the west side, two wooden and steel-standing terraces were built. The expansion was done with help of volunteer work, with 30 to 40 people helping each weekday evening and up to 80 people helping at the weekends.

The grandstand was moved to the north side and a new grandstand with seating for 3,700 people was opened on the east end in 1978. The new stand was the first in Norway to have plastic seats and is the oldest part of the current stadium. Construction cost NOK 2.8 million, which was largely loan-financed. Between 1980 and 1986, the area under the new grandstand was built to include new changing rooms, meeting rooms, offices and other facilities totalling 1,300 square meters (14,000 sq ft). Some of the office space was rented out.

After five years of planning, construction of a completely renovated stadium started in February 1999. To finance the stadium, a limited company, Åråsen Stadion AS, was established, and owned by the club, rather than by the limited company which runs the elite team. Only the East Stand from 1978 was kept. In 2000, new grass was laid on the pitch, replacing the original grass from 1950. This included the installation of under-soil heating and an automatic irrigation sprinkler system. The new pitch had the dimensions 105-by-65-meter (115 by 71 yd). Combined, this cost NOK 12 million. The first new stand to be completed was the West Stand, which opened ahead of the 2000 season. In addition to luxury boxes, it consists of 6,500 square meters (70,000 sq ft) of commercial property, including a car dealer, a medical centre and a restaurant.

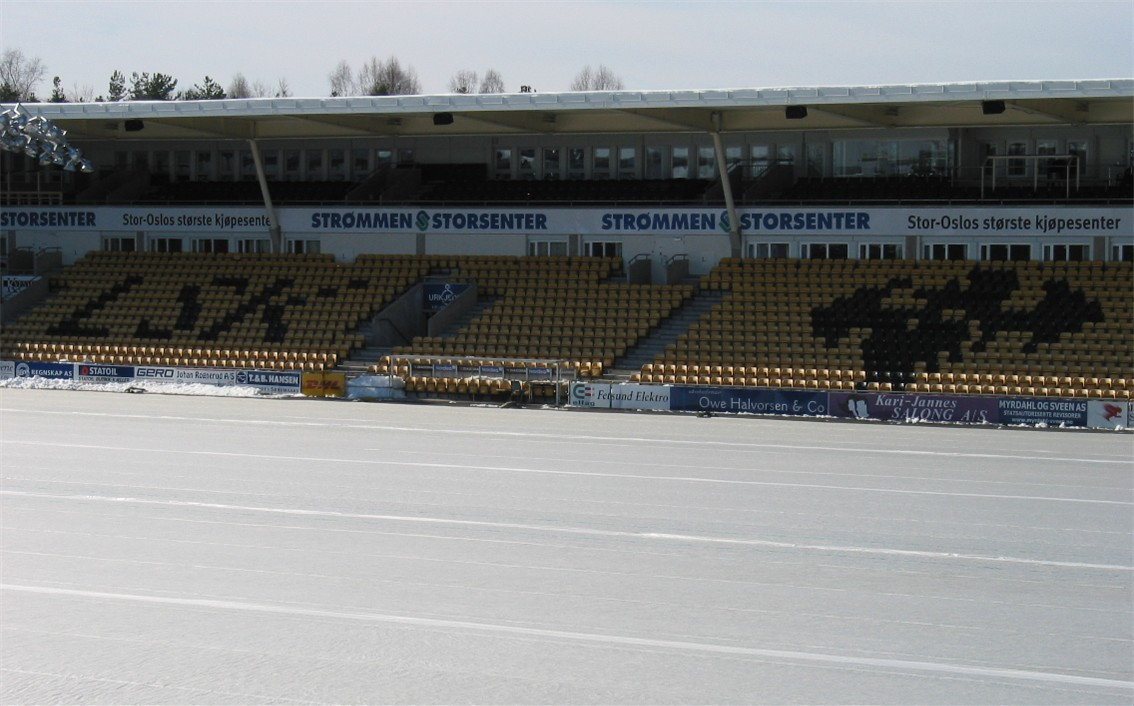
The two-tier West Stand, with luxury boxes in the upper tier

The investments at Åråsen cost NOK 800 million, of which NOK 240 million was used on the stadium itself. Other investments in the area were carried out by private investors and public agencies, who bought land from Lillestrøm SK. The training pitch to the north was demolished to make way for student housing for 100 people. The area to the west of the stadium was turned into a car retailer. Immediately surrounding the stadium was a complex of commercial and residential properties. This included an 8,500-square-meter (91,000 sq ft) section to the north which consists of 96 apartments, some with balconies facing the pitch, and a grocery store. Construction of the South Stand and affiliated buildings started on 15 November 2000 and was completed ahead of the 2002 season. In conjunction with the stand was a 2,000-square-meter (22,000 sq ft) commercial area rented by Akershus County Municipality, which hosts a psychiatric clinic for children and youth.

Because of the stadium's close proximity to Kjeller Airport, the stadium is limited to a height of 12 meters (39 ft), which meant the upgrade could not incorporate floodlights. When mounted on four posts, the floodlights need to be 40 meters (130 ft) above ground to give 1,200 lux on the field. In 2000, this caused Lillestrøm SK to have to play their home match in the 2000–01 UEFA Cup against Alavés at Marienlyst Stadion in Drammen. In 2001, an evening league game was played using floodlighting mounted on four temporary cranes. A retractable floodlighting system was installed in January 2002.

In 2006, Per Berg, the owner of Lillestrøm SK AS, stated that the club would be in need of a new venue and indicated that one could be built at Kjeller, should the airport close. By 2007, the club's management was working on ideas to build a new stadium, as the luxury boxes were all sold out and the club could not make more than NOK 22 to 23 million per year on commercial income from Åråsen. In 2009, Lillestrøm launched itself as one of six candidate cities for Norway's joint bid with Sweden to host Euro 2016. This would involve building a new venue seating between 35,000 and 44,000 in Lillestrøm. The stadium would be built in modules, so the upper tiers could be dismounted after the championship and installed on other venues. The proposal was selected as one of four for the bid, but the bid was never sent. In January 2009, the club sold 25 per cent of their ownership in Åråsen Eiendom, which is responsible for operating the commercial facilities at the stadium, to Lillestrømbanken, a local bank, for NOK 9 million. The club retained full ownership of Åråsen Stadion AS, the company which owns the venue.

Despite the ambitious plans for a new stadium around 2006-2009, nothing would ever materialise. The ideas came about while Norwegian football was undergoing a big boost in popularity, with the 2007 season averaging 9,018 spectators per match making the idea of building a new stadium more attractive. The seasons that followed would in contrast prove to be challenging with Lillestrøm SK facing economic challenges and a fall in average attendances. In December 2023, the club released plans for a full rebuild of the south stand, which would include closing the corner caps and moving the standing home supporters to the short end of the stadium.

== Facilities ==
Åråsen Stadion has a capacity of 10,540 spectators. The stadium consists of four single-tier stands. The western stand is the main stand, with the upper section consisting of luxury boxes and club seating for 700 people. For sponsorship reasons, it is known as the Romerike Sparebank Stand, after a local bank. The southern part of the East Stand houses the Kanarifansen, the official LSK supporters' group, while the northern part holds the away supporters. The South Stand is named for Romerikes Blad, the local newspaper, while the North Stand is named for Puma, the current sportswear manufacturer. The stadium is owned by Åråsen Stadion AS, which is fully owned by Lillestrøm SK. Operation of the venue's commercial properties is done by Åråsen Eiendom AS, which is 75 per cent owned by Åråsen Stadion and 25 per cent by Romerike Sparebank. The stadium is within walking distance of both the town centre of Lillestrøm and Lillestrøm Station. Lillestrøm SK holds their training sessions in the nearby Lillestrøm Stadion and LSK-Hallen. Since 2012 the Norway national football team has been using Åråsen and Lillestrøm stadion for training, largely due to not using an artificial turf, in addition to the near proximity to Oslo and the airport at Gardermoen.

== Events ==
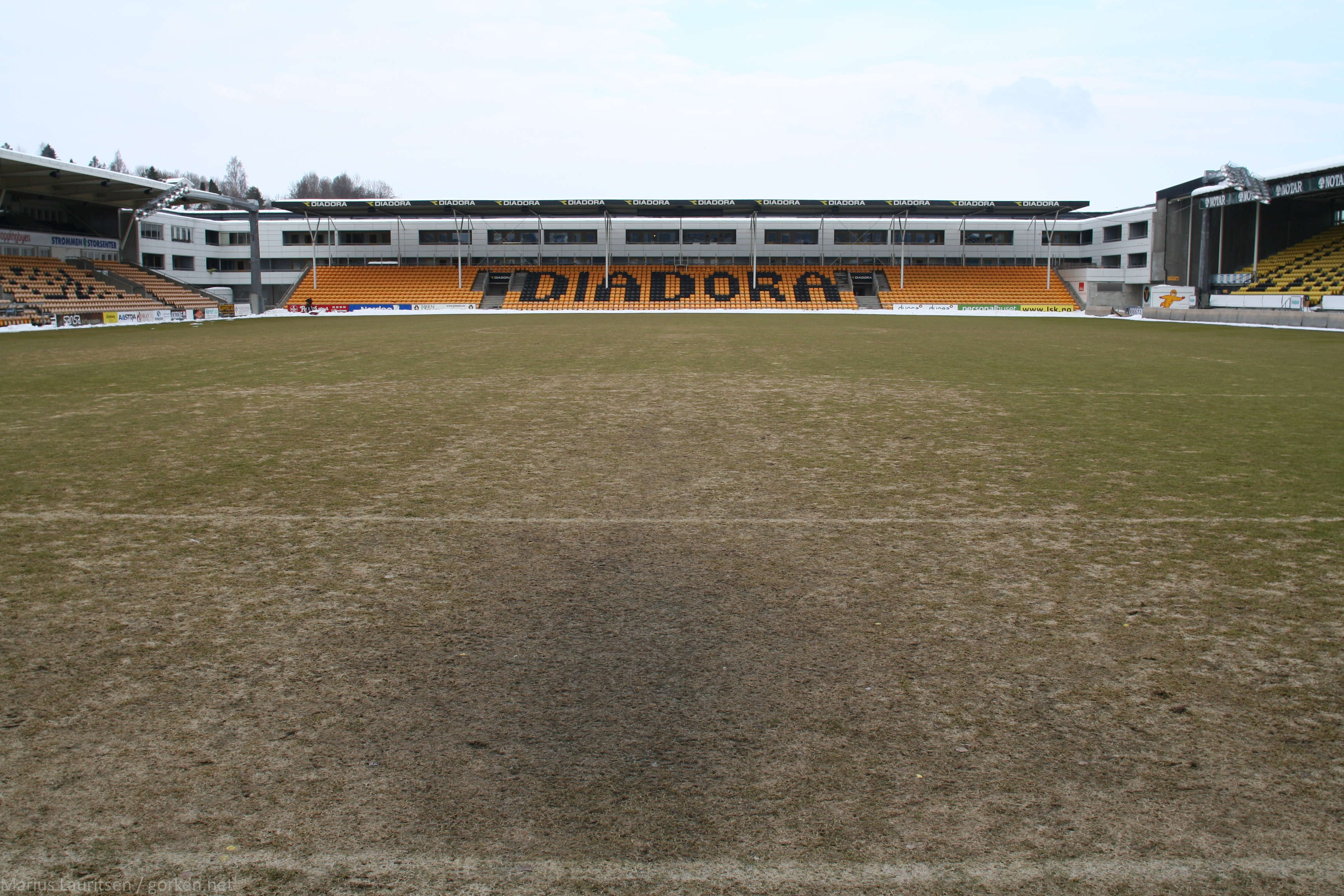
The North Stand. Also visible are the retractable flood lights.

Åråsen has been the home venue for Lillestrøm SK since the 1951 season and has been the venue for all their home league games. Åråsen has also been the venue for most LSK matches in UEFA tournaments, including the Champions League and the UEFA Cup, but the club has previously played some home matches at Ullevaal Stadion in Oslo and Marienlyst Stadion. The record attendance of 13,652 spectators was set on 16 May 2002 in the match between Lillestrøm and their rivals Vålerenga. The second-highest attended match was a cup match against Rosenborg in 1993, which attracted 13,595 people. The team's highest average league attendance was set in the 2007 season when there was an average of 9,018 spectators per match. The team's season average has been above 6,000 during the 2000s and was as low as 6,165 in 2010 and 6,448 in 2001. The team also saw high attendances in the 1970s, attracting its fourth-ever highest average in 1977 with 8,430 spectators, and attendances of 6,531 and 6,346 in 1978 and 1976, respectively. LSK's club seats tickets have often been among the most expensive in the league.

When Strømmen IF were promoted to the First division ahead of the 1986 season, the team originally announced that they would play their autumn games at Åråsen, as Strømmen Stadion was in need of a new pitch. In the end, Strømmen only played one of their matches at Åråsen, drawing 1–1 against Rosenborg on 10 August 1986 in front of 1,649 spectators.

Norway co-hosted UEFA Women's Euro 1997, and three group-stage matches and a semi-final were held at Åråsen. This included Norway playing two matches, against Denmark and Italy, which attracted 4,221 and 4,067 spectators, respectively. Norway's national women's team has also played eight other matches at Åråsen: 3–0 against Finland in 1983, 2–2 against Sweden in 1984, 1–0 against Finland in 1985, 4–0 against England in 1997, 2–0 against England in 1998, 4–0 against Ukraine in 2001, 4–1 against Ukraine in 2005 and 3–0 against Austria in 2007.

Norway hosted the 2002 UEFA European Under-19 Football Championship, with two group-stage matches being played at Åråsen. On 23 July, Slovakia beat the Czech Republic 5–2, and on 26 July Germany beat Belgium 2–1. The former attracted 611 spectators. The Norway national under-21 football team has played seven home matches at Åråsen: 1–3 against Sweden in 1979, 1–2 against France in 1987, 3–2 against San Marino in 1992, 0–0 against Georgia in 1999, 3–0 against Germany in 2001, 0–0 against Slovenia in 2004, and 1–0 against Turkey in 2007.
