= Lillestrøm SK =

Norwegian association football club

- Full name: Lillestrøm Sportsklubb
- Nicknames: Kanarifugla (The Canaries); Fugla (The Birds)
- Short name: LSK
- Founded: 2 April 1917; 109 years ago
- Ground: Åråsen Stadion; Lillestrøm
- Capacity: 12,250
- Chairman: Morten Kokkim
- Head coach: Hans Erik Ødegaard
- League: Eliteserien
- 2025: 1. divisjon, 1st of 16 (promoted)
- Website: www.lsk.no
Home colours	Away colours	Third colours

Lillestrøm Sportsklubb is a Norwegian professional football club based in the city of Lillestrøm, just outside of the capital Oslo, currently playing in Eliteserien. The club was founded in 1917, after the merger of two local football clubs. Their home ground is Åråsen Stadion, which has a capacity of 12,250 people, while the principal training ground is Lillestrøm stadion, or the indoor arena, LSK-Hallen. The club holds the Norwegian record for the most consecutive years without being relegated, having played 45 seasons from 1975 until 2019.Lillestrøm SK went undefeated throughout the 2025 season in 1.divisjon, without losing any of their league matches, something that has never happened before in the history of Norwegian 1.divisjon. They also rounded off the season with a Cup victory in the Norwegian cup, thus completing both the league and cup without a loss, which is completely unique historically in Norwegian football. Over the years the club has had around 40 players who have represented the Norwegian national team. There has also been a number of foreigners who have represented the national teams of the United States, Sweden, Iceland, Senegal, Finland, Malta, Australia, South Africa, Slovenia, Tunisia, Canada, Somalia, and Nigeria.

== History ==
Lillestrøm SK was founded on 2 April 1917. It has been Norwegian League champions five times, most recently in 1989, and also in 1986, 1977, 1976 and 1959. Additionally, they have won the Norwegian Cup in 1977, 1978, 1981, 1985, 2007, 2017 and 2025.

When Arne Erlandsen left for Sweden and IFK Göteborg after the 2004 season, former LSK player and German international Uwe Rösler took over as head coach of the team. His first season in charge became a successful one, with Lillestrøm finishing fourth in the league. This position secured LSK a place in the Royal League. The team also made it to the 2005 Norwegian Cup final, but lost 4–2 to Molde in front of a crowd of 25,000 at Ullevaal Stadion.

In the 2006 season, Lillestrøm were among the top favourites to win the league. Following a disappointing 4th place, it was announced on 13 November 2006 that Uwe Rösler had been fired from his position as head coach of Lillestrøm. Only a few days later Tom Nordlie signed a three-year contract.

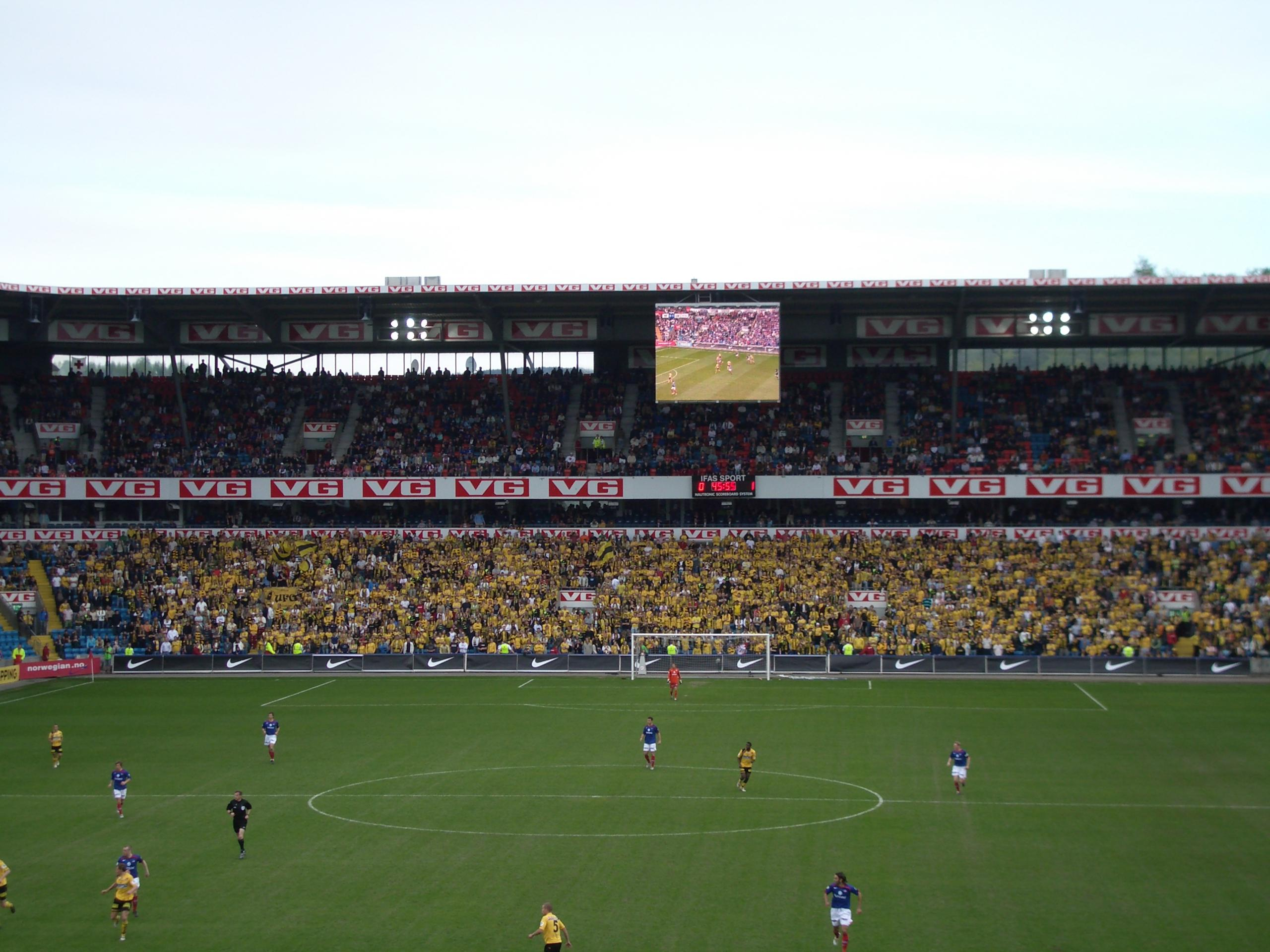
The supporters of Lillestrøm, "Kanari-fansen". From a match between Lillestrøm and Vålerenga at Ullevaal Stadion in 2006.

A key signing ahead of the 2007 season included Fredrikstad's Simen Brenne, an attacking midfielder with a knack for scoring important goals. LSK under Nordlie played a 4–3–3 system, which invites rapid transitional play between defence and attack, Lillestrøm finished fourth in the league and won the 2007 Norwegian cup, beating Haugesund 2–0 in the final at Ullevaal Stadion.

On 29 May 2008, Tom Nordlie resigned from his position as head coach after a disappointing start of the 2008 season. Statements from Nordlie suggested that fundamental disagreements with club director Aiden Stanley Anderson also contributed to his resignation. It later emerged that the conflict between the controversial coach and the players was another big contributor behind Nordlie's departure, his punishing training regime in the run-up to the 2008 season being cited as the main complaint. Nordlie, no stranger to controversy during his career, had reportedly "lost the dressing room" as early as autumn 2007.

Erland Johnsen and Frode Grodås stepped in as caretakers until a new head coach was hired. On 19 August 2008, the club announced that Henning Berg would take over as head coach on 1 January 2009, after leaving his post at Lyn. Berg's first task would be to rescue the team from relegation, a feat he accomplished in his very first match as head coach. LSK beat Rosenborg 4–2 in a classic encounter to secure their place in the Tippeligaen.

The 2009 season was one of great upheaval. In an increasingly tight economic position, LSK sold or released 11 players before and during the season, with Berg also restructuring the squad and bringing in new talent. Enormous injury problems also made the start to the season a difficult one for Berg's charges. After 9 games, LSK had won none and drawn four and seemed destined for relegation. An impressive comeback saw Lillestrøm deliver a strong second half to the season, eventually finishing 11th. Newcomer Nosa Igiebor had an especially impressive first season in the Lillestrøm jersey.

The team continued to impress over the course of the winter and start of the 2010 season. LSK were in early June fifth in the Tippeligaen, undefeated in 14 league matches. They saw, however, a dramatic drop in form over the summer which saw them briefly flirt with relegation, before a late surge of form late in the season salvaged 10th place.

In 2011, LSK made an exciting start to the new season, scoring an incredible 18 goals from their first five league matches, including a 7–0 drubbing of Stabæk in their first league match of the season – away from home. Early season form was good enough for the team to flirt with the top three until the end of July. Early in August, however, stars Anthony Ujah and Nosa Igiebor were sold to stave off the dire economic straits of the club. Also, in-form Icelandic midfielder Stefán Gíslason was out of contract and left the club. In mid-August, prodigy striker Björn Bergmann Sigurðarson was injured for the rest of the season, and the club failed to win any of their last 11 league games, a new record for Lillestrøm.

Coach Henning Berg was sacked three matches before the end of the season as investor Per Berg promised fresh funds for acquiring quality players after the season. The club again flirted with the prospect of relegation; however, the incessant poor form of Start and Sarpsborg meant Lillestrøm again saved themselves. This despite an abject 34 points gathered over 30 league matches, which normally would mean relegation.

Former Elfsborg coach Magnus Haglund was appointed coach after the season. Lillestrøm was quite active in the transfer window ahead of the 2012 season, and bought 11 new players. The change of coach and flurry of transfers did the club no good, however, as they again flirted with relegation until just a few weeks before the end of the season, hovering between 12th and 14th place before a strong finish to the season propelled them into 9th. On the whole the season was deemed a big disappointment, however, and Haglund's position has been subject to debate throughout the winter pre-season.

Ahead of the 2013 season, the club again has reined in spending and started the season with a first team squad of just 18 full senior players and additional backup players from the youth academy. LSK under Haglund have performed well away from home (2nd best away record in 2012), but often struggled on their own turf.

== Honours ==
Lillestrøm SK's honours
Competition	Titles	Seasons
Eliteserien	5	1958–59, 1976, 1977, 1986, 1989
Norwegian Cup	7	1977, 1978, 1981, 1985, 2007, 2017, 2025
First Division	3	1951–52, 1974, 2025

Runners-up:
- Eliteserien (8): 1959–60, 1978, 1983, 1985, 1988, 1994, 1996, 2001
- Norwegian Cup (8): 1953, 1955, 1958, 1980, 1986, 1992, 2005, 2022-23
- First Division (4): 1953, 1962, 1963, 2020
- Royal League (1): 2005–06
- UEFA Intertoto Cup (1): 2006

== Recent history ==
Season		Pos.	Pl.	W	D	L	GS	GA	P	Cup	Notes
1995	Tippeligaen	4	26	11	8	7	50	36	41	Semi-final	
1996	Tippeligaen	2	26	13	7	6	54	33	46	Third round	
1997	Tippeligaen	10	26	9	6	11	41	49	33	Fourth round	
1998	Tippeligaen	8	26	9	5	12	34	43	32	Third round	
1999	Tippeligaen	4	26	15	3	8	60	41	48	Quarter-final	
2000	Tippeligaen	6	26	11	7	8	42	29	40	Quarter-final	
2001	Tippeligaen	2	26	17	5	4	64	33	56	Semi-final	
2002	Tippeligaen	7	26	10	6	10	37	30	36	Third round	
2003	Tippeligaen	7	26	10	7	9	33	35	37	Fourth round	
2004	Tippeligaen	7	26	8	11	7	45	33	35	Semi-final	
2005	Tippeligaen	4	26	12	6	8	37	31	42	Final	
2006	Tippeligaen	4	26	12	8	6	44	33	44	Quarter-final	
2007	Tippeligaen	4	26	12	8	6	47	28	44	Winner	
2008	Tippeligaen	12	26	7	7	12	30	40	28	Second round	
2009	Tippeligaen	11	30	9	10	11	43	50	37	Fourth round	
2010	Tippeligaen	10	30	9	13	8	51	44	40	Third round	
2011	Tippeligaen	13	30	9	7	14	46	52	34	Fourth round	
2012	Tippeligaen	9	30	9	12	9	46	47	39	Fourth round	
2013	Tippeligaen	10	30	9	9	12	37	44	36	Semi-final	
2014	Tippeligaen	5	30	13	7	10	49	35	46	Quarter-final	
2015	Tippeligaen	8	30	12	9	9	45	43	44	Third round	
2016	Tippeligaen	12	30	8	10	12	45	50	34	Third round	
2017	Eliteserien	12	30	10	7	13	40	43	37	Winner	
2018	Eliteserien	12	30	7	11	12	34	44	32	Semi-final	
2019	Eliteserien	↓ 14	30	7	9	14	32	47	30	Third round	Relegated to 1. divisjon through play-offs
2020	1. divisjon	↑ 2	30	16	9	5	49	26	57	Cancelled	Promoted to Eliteserien
2021	Eliteserien	4	30	14	7	9	49	40	49	Quarter-final	
2022	Eliteserien	4	30	16	5	9	49	34	53	Final	
2023	Eliteserien	6	30	13	4	13	49	49	43	Second round	
2024	Eliteserien	↓ 15	30	7	3	20	33	63	24	Quarter-final	Relegated to 1. divisjon
2025	OBOS-ligaen	↑ 1	30	25	5	0	87	18	80	Winner	Promoted to Eliteserien
2026 (in progress)	Eliteserien	5	25	13	3	9	36	33	42	Quarter-final	

== European record ==
As of 5 November 2026

=== Summary ===
Competition	Pld	W	D	L	GF	GA	Last season played
European Cup; UEFA Champions League	14	3	5	6	10	17	2002–03
UEFA Cup	33	11	4	18	38	58	2026–27
UEFA Cup Winners' Cup	10	3	0	7	11	18	1993–94
UEFA Europa Conference League	4	2	0	2	7	7	2022–23
UEFA Intertoto Cup	8	4	2	2	18	11	2006
Total	69	23	11	35	84	111	

Pld = Matches played; W = Matches won; D = Matches drawn; L = Matches lost; GF = Goals for; GA = Goals against. Defunct competitions indicated in italics.

=== List of matches ===
Season	Competition	Round	Opponent	Home	Away	Agg.
1977–78	European Cup	R1	(Netherlands) Ajax	2–0	0–4	2–4
1978–79	European Cup	R1	(Northern Ireland) Linfield	1–0	0–0	1–0
1978–79	European Cup	R2	Austria Vienna	0–0	1–4	1–4
1979–80	Cup Winners' Cup	PR	(Scotland) Rangers	0–2	0–1	0–3
1982–83	Cup Winners' Cup	R1	(Socialist Federal Republic of Yugoslavia) Red Star Belgrade	0–4	0–3	0–7
1984–85	UEFA Cup	R1	(East Germany) Lokomotive Leipzig	3–0	0–7	3–7
1986–87	Cup Winners' Cup	R1	(Portugal) Benfica	1–2	0–2	1–4
1987–88	European Cup	R1	(Northern Ireland) Linfield	1–1	4–2	5–3
1987–88	European Cup	R2	(France) Bordeaux	0–0	0–1	0–1
1989–90	UEFA Cup	R1	(West Germany) Werder Bremen	1–3	0–2	1–5
1990–91	European Cup	R1	(Belgium) Club Brugge	1–1	0–2	1–3
1993–94	Cup Winners' Cup	QR	(Estonia) Nikol Tallinn	4–1	4–0	8–1
1993–94	Cup Winners' Cup	R1	(Italy) Torino	0–2	2–1	2–3
1994–95	UEFA Cup	PR	(Ukraine) Shakhtar Donetsk	4–1	0–2	4–3
1994–95	UEFA Cup	R1	(France) Bordeaux	0–2	1–3	1–5
1995–96	UEFA Cup	PR	(Estonia) Flora Tallinn	4–0	0–1	4–1
1995–96	UEFA Cup	R1	(Denmark) Brøndby	0–0	0–3	0–3
1996–97	Intertoto Cup	Group; 5	(Lithuania) Kaunas	N/A	4–1	2nd
1996–97	Intertoto Cup	Group; 5	(Republic of Ireland) Sligo Rovers	4–0	N/A	2nd
1996–97	Intertoto Cup	Group; 5	(Netherlands) Heerenveen	N/A	1–0	2nd
1996–97	Intertoto Cup	Group; 5	(France) Nantes	2–3	N/A	2nd
1997–98	UEFA Cup	QR2	(Belarus) Dinamo Minsk	1–0	2–0	3–0
1997–98	UEFA Cup	R1	(Netherlands) Twente	2–1	0–1	2–2 (a)
2000–01	UEFA Cup	QR	(Northern Ireland) Glentoran	1–0	3–0	4–0
2000–01	UEFA Cup	R1	(Russia) Dynamo Moscow	3–1	1–2	4–3
2000–01	UEFA Cup	R2	(Spain) Deportivo Alavés	1–3	2–2	3–5
2002–03	Champions League	QR2	(Bosnia and Herzegovina) Željezničar	0–1	0–1	0–2
2006–07	Intertoto Cup	R2	(Iceland) Keflavík	4–1	2–2	6–3
2006–07	Intertoto Cup	R3	(England) Newcastle United	0–3	1–1	1–4
2007–08	UEFA Cup	QR1	(Luxembourg) Käerjéng 97	2–1	0–1	2–2 (a)
2008–09	UEFA Cup	QR2	(Denmark) Copenhagen	2–4	1–3	3–7
2018–19	UEFA Europa League	QR2	(Austria) LASK Linz	1–2	0–4	1–6
2022–23	UEFA Europa Conference League	QR2	(Finland) SJK	5–2	1–0	6–2
2022–23	UEFA Europa Conference League	QR3	(Belgium) Royal Antwerp	1–3	0–2	1–5
2026–27	UEFA Europa League	PO	(Albania) Egnatia	2–1 (a.e.t.)	0–0	2-1
2026–27	UEFA Europa League	League phase	(Portugal) Torreense	1-2	N/A	
2026–27	UEFA Europa League	League phase	(Czech Republic) Sparta Prague	N/A	1–1	
2026–27	UEFA Europa League	League phase	(Spain) Real Sociedad	0-6	N/A	
2026–27	UEFA Europa League	League phase	(Czech Republic) Viktoria Plzeň	0-1	N/A	
2026–27	UEFA Europa League	League phase	(France) Lyon	N/A		
2026–27	UEFA Europa League	League phase	(Bulgaria) Levski Sofia	N/A		
2026–27	UEFA Europa League	League phase	(England) Bournemouth		N/A	
2026–27	UEFA Europa League	League phase	(Spain) Celta Vigo	N/A		

== Records ==
- Greatest home victory: 10–0 vs. Geithus, 4 October 1953
- Greatest away victory: 7–0 vs. Stabæk, 20 March 2011
- Heaviest home loss: 1–7 vs. Fredrikstad, 15 August 1954
- Heaviest away loss: 1–7 vs. Odd, 7 June 1953
- Highest attendance, Åråsen Stadion: 13,652 vs. Vålerenga, 16 May 2002
- Highest average attendance, season: 9,018 in 2007
- Most appearances, total: 720, Frode Kippe 1997–1998, 2002–2019
- Most appearances, league: 441, Frode Kippe 1997–1998, 2002–2019
- Most goals scored, total: 319, Tom Lund 1967–82
- Most goals scored, league: 154, Tom Lund 1967–82
- Most goals scored, season: 26, Tom Lund 1973

== Players ==
=== Current squad ===
As of 7 September 2026

Note: Flags indicate national team as defined under FIFA eligibility rules; some limited exceptions apply. Players may hold more than one non-FIFA nationality.

No.	Pos.	Nation	Player
1	GK	NOR	Stefan Hagerup
2	DF	NOR	Lars Ranger
3	DF	NOR	Sturla Ottesen
4	DF	NOR	Espen Garnås
5	DF	NOR	Sander Moen Foss
6	MF	NOR	Harald Woxen
7	MF	SWE	Linus Alperud
8	FW	NOR	Fredrik Gulbrandsen
10	FW	NOR	Thomas Lehne Olsen
11	DF	DEN	Frederik Elkær
12	GK	SWE	Pontus Dahlberg
14	MF	NOR	Gustav Nyheim
15	MF	SWE	Gustav Nordh
16	MF	NOR	Henrik Melland
17	MF	NOR	Eric Kitolano

No.	Pos.	Nation	Player
18	MF	NOR	Kevin Martin Krygård
19	FW	SWE	Camil Jebara
20	FW	ANG	Felix Vá
21	MF	SWE	Filip Ottosson (on loan from IFK Göteborg)
22	MF	NOR	Daniel Bassi
25	FW	NGR	Seun Akanji
26	FW	NOR	Yaw Paintsil
28	DF	NOR	Ruben Gabrielsen (captain)
29	MF	KOS	Ylldren Ibrahimaj
35	DF	NOR	Filip Reshane
36	DF	NOR	Isa Daniel Jallow
41	FW	NOR	Ivar Winje
47	DF	NOR	Stian Kristiansen
50	GK	NOR	Lazar Babic

For season transfers, see List of Norwegian football transfers winter 2025–26, and List of Norwegian football transfers summer 2026.

=== Out on loan ===
Note: Flags indicate national team as defined under FIFA eligibility rules; some limited exceptions apply. Players may hold more than one non-FIFA nationality.

No.	Pos.	Nation	Player
9	FW	NGR	Kparobo Arierhi (at Sogndal until 31 December 2026)
21	DF	NGR	Tochukwu Joseph Ogboji (at Strømmen until 31 December 2026)
27	FW	NOR	Markus Wæhler (at Strømmen until 31 December 2026)

No.	Pos.	Nation	Player
30	DF	NOR	Lucas Svenningsen (at Kongsvinger until 31 December 2026)
31	FW	GRE	Angelos Chaminta (at Kongsvinger until 31 December 2026)

=== Coaching staff ===
Position	Name
Head coach	(Norway) Hans Erik Ødegaard
Assistant coach	(Norway) Eirik Mæland
Goalkeeping coach	(Poland) Bartosz Deregowski
Fitness coach/Physio	(Norway) Geir Kåsene
Physio	(Norway) Sondre Sjøgren Jakobsen
Head of Analytics	(Norway) Yannick Skar-Lentze
Sports coordinator	(Norway) Tor Arne Solberg
Doctor	(Norway) Pål Jeroen Husby
Scout	(Norway) Espen Olsen

=== Academy ===
Position	Name
Head of academy	(Spain) Toni Ordinas
Administrative leader	(Norway) Oscar Killingmoe
Top player developer	(Norway) Frode Kippe
Coach developer	(Portugal) Ruben Quintão

=== Administrative staff ===
Position	Name
Chairman	(Norway) Stian Thomassen
Managing director	(Norway) Robert Lauritsen
Sporting director	(Norway) Simon Mesfin
Sales and partnership rep	(Norway) Kari Herredsvela
Sales and partnership rep	(Norway) Kine Klevengen
Financial and administration director	(Norway) Linda Djupnes
Head of communications	(Norway) Andreas Aalling
Marketing consultant/club store manager	(Norway) Jørgen Heen Enger

== Coaches ==
- (Norway) Alf Martinsen (1947–50; 1952–53)
- (Iceland) Karl Guðmundsson (1958; 1960)
- (Norway) Ragnar Larsen (1962)
- (Norway) Walther Svendsen (1963)
- (Norway) Henry Mathiesen (1964–1965)
- (Norway) Rolf Wahl (1966)
- (Norway) Ivar Christiansen (1967)
- (Norway) Rolf Wahl (1968)
- (Norway) Svein Bergersen/ (Norway) Rolf Wahl (1971)
- (Norway) Oddvar Richardsen (1972)
- (Norway) Joar Hoff (1973)
- (Norway) Ronny Mathiesen (1974)
- (Norway) Joar Hoff (1975–1976)
- (England) Joe Hooley (1977–1980)
- (Norway) Kjell Schou-Andreassen (1980–1982)
- (Norway) Joar Hoff (1982)
- (England) Bill Foulkes (1984)
- (Norway) Tom Lund (1985–1988)
- (Scotland) David Hay (1989–1990)
- (Norway) Tom Lund (1 July 1990 – 30 June 1991)
- (Norway) Ivar Hoff (1991–1993)
- (Iceland) Teitur Þórðarson (1994– Sept 9, 1995)
- (Norway) Arne Erlandsen/ (Norway) Kjetil Osvold (Sept 10, 1995–1996)
- (Norway) Per Brogeland (1996– 1 June 1997)
- (Norway) Even Pellerud (1997)
- (Norway) Arne Erlandsen (1998–2005)
- (Germany) Uwe Rösler (2005–2007)
- (Norway) Tom Nordlie (2007 – 29 May 2008)
- (Norway) Erland Johnsen (caretaker) (29 May 2008 – 16 June 2008)
- (Norway) Erland Johnsen (16 June 2008 – 21 Oct 2008)
- (Norway) Henning Berg (21 Oct 2008 – 26 Oct 2011)
- (Norway) Petter Belsvik/ (Sweden) Magnus Powell (caretakers) (26 Oct 2011–2012)
- (Sweden) Magnus Haglund (2012–2015)
- (Iceland) Rúnar Kristinsson (2015– 18 Sep 2016)
- (Norway) Arne Erlandsen (20 Sep 2016 – 26 June 2018)
- (Norway) Arild Sundgot (caretaker) (26 June 2018 – 13 July 2018)
- (Sweden) Jörgen Lennartsson (13 July 2018 – 2 December 2019)
- (Norway) Tom Nordlie (caretaker) (3 December 2019 – 11 December 2019)
- (Norway) Geir Bakke (31 December 2019 – 12 July 2023)
- (Norway) Simon Mesfin/ (Norway) Frode Kippe (caretakers) (12 July 2023 – 20 August 2023)
- (Norway) Eirik Bakke (caretaker) (20 August 2023 – 21 December 2023)
- (Sweden) Andreas Georgson (21 December 2023 – 26 July 2024)
- (Sweden) Robin Asterhed (caretaker) (9 August 2024 – 23 August 2024)
- (Denmark) David Nielsen (caretaker) (23 August 2024 – 30 September 2024)
- (Norway) Dag Eilev Fagermo (30 September 2024 – 10 December 2024)
- (Norway) Hans Erik Ødegaard (10 December 2024 –)

== Supporters ==
Lillestrøm is one of the most supported clubs in Norway, and has the second biggest fan-club in Norway, as the official fan-club, Kanarifansen has more than 5,000 members. Kanarifansen was founded on 3 December 1992 and publishes its own magazines and has its own collection of clothing.

=== Rivalries ===
Lillestrøm's biggest rival is Vålerenga Fotball. The club also has a rivalry with Rosenborg. Their traditional local rival dated back to the clubs foundation is Strømmen IF.
