= 2024 Lillestrøm SK season =

Lillestrøm
2024 season
- Chairman: Morten Kokkim
- Head coach: Andreas Georgson
- Stadium: Åråsen Stadion
- Eliteserien: 15th (relegated)
- Norwegian Cup: Quarter-finals
- Top goalscorer: League: Thomas Lehne Olsen (9); All: Thomas Lehne Olsen (12)
Home colours	Away colours

The 2024 season was Lillestrøm SK's 106th season in existence and the club's fourth consecutive season in the top flight of Norwegian football. In addition to the domestic league, Lillestrøm SK participated in this season's edition of the Norwegian Football Cup.

== Players ==
=== First team squad ===
As of 17 July 2024

Note: Flags indicate national team as defined under FIFA eligibility rules; some limited exceptions apply. Players may hold more than one non-FIFA nationality.

No.	Pos.	Nation	Player
1	GK	NOR	Stefan Hagerup
2	DF	NOR	Lars Ranger
3	DF	NOR	Martin Ove Roseth
4	DF	NOR	Espen Garnås
5	DF	IRQ	Mohanad Jeahze
6	MF	NOR	Vebjørn Hoff
7	FW	KOS	Ylldren Ibrahimaj
8	MF	NOR	Marius Lundemo
9	FW	SWE	Jabir Abdihakim Ali (on loan from Västerås)
10	FW	NOR	Thomas Lehne Olsen
11	DF	DEN	Frederik Elkær
12	GK	NOR	Mads Hedenstad Christiansen
14	FW	CIV	Mathis Bolly
15	MF	NOR	Erling Knudtzon
16	MF	NGR	Uba Charles
17	MF	NOR	Eric Kitolano
18	MF	SWE	August Karlin

No.	Pos.	Nation	Player
19	DF	NOR	Kristoffer Tønnessen
20	FW	ANG	Felix Vá
21	MF	NOR	Markus Karlsbakk
22	FW	NOR	Elias Solberg
23	MF	NOR	Gjermund Åsen
28	DF	NOR	Ruben Gabrielsen (captain)
29	GK	NOR	Jørgen Sveinhaug
30	DF	NOR	Sander Moen Foss
31	GK	NOR	Oliver Petersen (on loan from Molde)
33	FW	SEN	Moctar Diop
37	MF	NOR	Leandro Neto
38	FW	NOR	Alexander Røssing-Lelesiit
43	FW	NOR	Markus Wæhler
55	MF	NOR	Kevin Krygård
64	DF	SWE	Eric Larsson
77	DF	NOR	Lucas Svenningsen

=== Out on loan ===
Note: Flags indicate national team as defined under FIFA eligibility rules; some limited exceptions apply. Players may hold more than one non-FIFA nationality.

No.	Pos.	Nation	Player
24	MF	NGR	Efe Lucky (at Åsane until 31 December 2024)
26	FW	NOR	Oliver Henriksrud (at Strømmen until 31 December 2024)
27	MF	NOR	Uranik Seferi (at Hødd until 31 December 2024)

No.	Pos.	Nation	Player
90	FW	NOR	El Schaddai Furaha (at Raufoss until 31 December 2024)
—	DF	NOR	Maximilian Balatoni (at Strømmen until 31 December 2024)
—	DF	USA	Sam Rogers (at Aalesund until 31 December 2024)

== Transfers ==
=== Winter ===
In: Note: Flags indicate national team as defined under FIFA eligibility rules; some limited exceptions apply. Players may hold more than one non-FIFA nationality.

No.	Pos.	Nation	Player
1	GK	NOR	Stefan Hagerup (from Ull/Kisa)
15	FW	NOR	Erling Knudtzon (from Molde)
17	MF	NOR	Eric Kitolano (from Molde)
18	MF	SWE	August Karlin (from (Sweden) Malmö)
21	FW	NOR	Daniel Skaarud (promoted from junior squad)
24	MF	NGR	Efe Lucky (from (Nigeria) Collins Edwin)
26	FW	NOR	Oliver Odde Henriksrud (promoted from junior squad)
27	FW	NOR	Uranik Seferi (loan return from Strømmen)
30	DF	NOR	Sander Moen Foss (from Sandefjord)
—	FW	ANG	Felix Vá (on loan from (Sweden) Djurgården)
—	MF	NOR	Dylan Murugesapillai (loan return from Træff)
90	MF	NOR	El Schaddai Furaha (promoted from junior squad)

Out: Note: Flags indicate national team as defined under FIFA eligibility rules; some limited exceptions apply. Players may hold more than one non-FIFA nationality.

No.	Pos.	Nation	Player
1	GK	NOR	Knut-André Skjærstein (to Egersund, previously on loan)
15	MF	CAN	Kosi Thompson (loan return to (Canada) Toronto)
20	DF	NOR	Vetle Skjærvik (to Tromsø)
22	DF	NOR	Philip Slørdahl (to Ranheim)
25	MF	NOR	Eskil Edh (to (Sweden) AIK)
31	MF	NOR	Martin Bergum (to Ull/Kisa, previously on loan at Strømmen)

=== Summer ===
In: Note: Flags indicate national team as defined under FIFA eligibility rules; some limited exceptions apply. Players may hold more than one non-FIFA nationality.

No.	Pos.	Nation	Player
5	DF	IRQ	Mohanad Jeahze (from (United States) DC United)
9	FW	SWE	Jabir Abdihakim Ali (on loan from (Sweden) Västerås)
20	FW	ANG	Felix Vá (from (Sweden) Djurgården, previously on loan)
21	MF	NOR	Markus Karlsbakk (from Aalesund)
29	GK	NOR	Jørgen Sveinhaug (loan return from Strømmen)
31	GK	NOR	Oliver Petersen (on loan from Molde)
33	FW	SEN	Moctar Diop (from Aalesund)
37	MF	NOR	Leandro Neto (promoted from junior squad)
38	FW	NOR	Alexander Røssing-Lelesiit (promoted from junior squad)
43	FW	NOR	Markus Wæhler (promoted from junior squad)
55	MF	NOR	Kevin Krygård (from (Portugal) Casa Pia)
77	DF	NOR	Lucas Svenningsen (from Ull/Kisa)

Out: Note: Flags indicate national team as defined under FIFA eligibility rules; some limited exceptions apply. Players may hold more than one non-FIFA nationality.

No.	Pos.	Nation	Player
5	DF	USA	Sam Rogers (on loan to Aalesund, previously on loan at Hamkam)
21	FW	NOR	Daniel Skaarud (to (Netherlands) Jong Ajax)
24	MF	NGR	Efe Lucky (on loan to Åsane)
27	MF	NOR	Uranik Seferi (on loan to Hødd)
33	FW	NOR	Henrik Skogvold (to Fredrikstad)
90	MF	NOR	El Schaddai Furaha (on loan to Raufoss)

== Pre-season and friendlies ==
Win Draw Loss Fixtures

27 January 2024 Friendly	Lillestrøm (Norway)	2–1	(Norway) Fredrikstad	Lillestrøm
12:00 CET (UTC+1)	Moen Foss (yellow card) 26'; Furaha 63'; Ariheri 89'; Lucky (yellow card) 90+3'	Report	Woledzi (yellow card) 32'; Gabrielsen 66' (o.g.)	Stadium: LSK-Hallen; Attendance: 1,500; Referee: Eivind Bodding

7 February 2024 Friendly	Tenerife B (Spain)	3–3	(Norway) Lillestrøm	Tenerife, Spain
12:00 CET (UTC+1)	Mané 49'; Fran 80'; Garcia 82'		Furaha 36'; Lehne Olsen 53'; Tønnessen 72'	Stadium: Tenerife Top Training Center; Attendance: 10; Referee: Adrian Cruz (Spain)

16 February 2024 Friendly	Lillestrøm (Norway)	2–2	(Norway) Sandefjord	Lillestrøm
15:00 CET (UTC+1)	Seferi 60'; Skogvold 90+3' (pen.)		Dunsby 20'; Ruud Tveter 73'	Stadium: LSK-Hallen; Attendance: 500; Referee: Jørgen Haugen

28 February 2024 Friendly	Lillestrøm (Norway)	0–1	(Norway) Strømsgodset	Marbella, Spain
16:00 CET (UTC+1)			Dahl (yellow card) 20'; Tómasson 31'	Stadium: Estepona Football Center; Attendance: 100; Referee: Stian Røvig Sletner

2 March 2024 Friendly	Lillestrøm (Norway)	0–0	(Norway) Mjøndalen	Marbella, Spain
14:00 CET (UTC+1)	Ranger (yellow card) 10'		Øverby (yellow card) 30'; Vogt (yellow card) 49'; Holten (yellow card) 89'	Stadium: La Quinta Football Center; Attendance: 100; Referee: Marius Hansen Grøtta

9 March 2024 Friendly	Lillestrøm (Norway)	3–1	(Norway) KFUM Oslo	Lillestrøm
14:00 CET (UTC+1)	Olsen 15'; Ibrahimaj 19'; Skogvold 37'		Hestnes 5'	Stadium: LSK-Hallen; Referee: Anders Bodding

12 March 2024 Friendly	Lillestrøm (Norway)	2–2	(Norway) Raufoss	Lillestrøm
13:00 CET (UTC+1)	Solberg 42' (pen.); Hagerup 90'		Nordbø (yellow card) 24' (goal) 72'; Roseth 26' (o.g.); Emsis (yellow card) 64'; Hay (yellow card) 75'	Stadium: LSK-Hallen; Attendance: 150; Referee: Jørgen Haugen

16 March 2024 Friendly	Lillestrøm (Norway)	2–1	(Norway) Odd	Lillestrøm
12:00 CET (UTC+1)	Olsen 61'; Roseth 68'		Børven 43'; Svendsen (yellow card) 87'; Baccay (yellow card) 90'	Stadium: LSK-Hallen; Attendance: 500; Referee: Arion Shaqiri

23 March 2024 Friendly	Stabæk (Norway)	0–1	(Norway) Lillestrøm	Bærum
18:00 CET (UTC+1)	Buki (yellow card) 84'		Kitolano (yellow card) 38'; Roseth 48'; Karlin (yellow card) 71'	Stadium: Nadderud Stadion; Referee: Anders Bodding

== Competitions ==
=== Overview ===
Competition	First match	Last match	Starting round	Final position	Record							
Competition	First match	Last match	Starting round	Final position	Pld	W	D	L	GF	GA	GD	Win %
Eliteserien	1 April 2024	1 December 2024	Matchday 1	15th	30	7	3	20	33	63	−30	23.33
Norwegian Cup	10 April 2024	6 October 2024	First round	Quarter-finals	5	4	0	1	21	11	+10	80.00
Total					35	11	3	21	54	74	−20	31.43

Last updated: 1 December 2024
Source: Soccerway

=== Eliteserien ===
==== League table ====
Pos	Team	Pld	W	D	L	GF	GA	GD	Pts	Qualification or relegation
12	HamKam	30	8	9	13	34	39	−5	33	
13	Tromsø	30	9	6	15	34	44	−10	33	
14	Haugesund (O)	30	9	6	15	29	46	−17	33	Qualification for the relegation play-offs
15	Lillestrøm (R)	30	7	3	20	33	63	−30	24	Relegation to First Division
16	Odd (R)	30	5	8	17	26	54	−28	23	Relegation to First Division

Source: Football Association of Norway (in Norwegian)
Rules for classification: 1) Points; 2) Goal difference; 3) Goals scored; 4) Head-to-head points; 5) Head-to-head goal difference; 6) Head-to-head goals scored.
(O) Play-off winners; (R) Relegated

==== Results summary ====
Overall								Home						Away					
Pld	W	D	L	GF	GA	GD	Pts	W	D	L	GF	GA	GD	W	D	L	GF	GA	GD
30	7	3	20	33	63	−30	24	3	3	9	16	30	−14	4	0	11	17	33	−16

Last updated: 1 December 2024.

==== Results by round ====
Round	1	2	3	4	5	6	7	8	9	10	11	12	13	14	15	16	17	18	19	20	21	22	23	24	25	26	27	28	29	30
Ground	H	A	H	A	H	A	H	A	H	A	A	H	A	H	A	H	A	H	A	H	A	H	A	H	A	H	H	A	H	A
Result	L	W	L	W	D	L	L	W	L	L	W	W	L	W	L	D	L	L	L	L	L	D	L	L	L	W	L	L	L	L
Position	10	4	12	8	8	11	13	7	12	13	11	7	9	7	10	9	10	12	13	15	15	15	16	16	16	15	15	15	15	15

A = Away; H = Home; W = Win; D = Draw; L = Loss

==== Matches ====
The league fixtures were announced on 20 December 2023.

1 April 2024 1	Lillestrøm	2–3	Kristiansund	Lillestrøm
17:00 CEST (UTC+2)	Garnås 59'; Olsen 82'	Report	Alte 13'; Guèye (yellow card) 38'; Hilmir Rafn (yellow card) 47'; Ulvestad 49'; Bruseth 66'	Stadium: Åråsen Stadion; Attendance: 9,457; Referee: Tore Hansen

7 April 2024 2	Haugesund	0–2	Lillestrøm	Haugesund
17:00 CEST (UTC+2)	Diarra (yellow card) 24'; Seone (yellow card) 80'	Report	Olsen 13'; Kitolano 34'; Garnås (yellow card) 45+3'	Stadium: Haugesund Sparebank Arena; Attendance: 7,134; Referee: Sivert Øksnes Amland

14 April 2024 3	Lillestrøm	0–5	Bodø/Glimt	Lillestrøm
19:15 CEST (UTC+2)		Report	Žugelj 11'; Hauge (yellow card) 19'; Evjen (yellow card) 48' (goal) 76'; Berg 55' (yellow card) 76'; Grønbæk 59'; Høgh 82'	Stadium: Åråsen Stadion; Attendance: 8,344; Referee: Kristoffer Hagenes

21 April 2024 4	Sandefjord	0–1	Lillestrøm	Sandefjord
18:00 CEST (UTC+2)	Gjone (yellow card) 77'	Report	Olsen 60'; Kitolano (yellow card) 65'	Stadium: Jotun Arena; Attendance: 4,089; Referee: Svein Tore Sinnes

28 April 2024 5	Lillestrøm	1–1	HamKam	Lillestrøm
17:00 CEST (UTC+2)	Charles (yellow card) 5'; Vá 39' (red card) 45'; Knudtzon (yellow card) 45+4'	Report	Onsrud (yellow card) 24'; Ødegård 51'; Kjærgaard (yellow card) 71'	Stadium: Åråsen Stadion; Attendance: 6,190; Referee: Daniel Higraff

5 May 2024 6	Sarpsborg 08	1–0	Lillestrøm	Sarpsborg
17:00 CEST (UTC+2)	Ødegård (yellow card) 66'; Wichne 68'	Report	Olsen (yellow card) 59'	Stadium: Sarpsborg Stadion; Attendance: 4,706; Referee: Mohammad Usman Aslam

12 May 2024 7	Lillestrøm	0–2	Brann	Lillestrøm
19:15 CEST (UTC+2)	Gabrielsen (yellow card) 35'; Roseth (yellow card) 43' (yellow-red card) 73'	Report	Blomberg (yellow card) 8'; Heltne Nilsen 59'; Soltvedt 68'; Kornvig (yellow card) 73'	Stadium: Åråsen Stadion; Attendance: 8,386; Referee: Tore Hansen

16 May 2024 8	Viking	1–4	Lillestrøm	Stavanger
18:00 CEST (UTC+2)	Tripić 68' (pen.)	Report	Olsen 5' (pen.); Åsen 8'; Kitolano 38'; Lundemo (yellow card) 43'; Garnås (yellow card) 45'; Knudtzon 90+1'; Lucky (yellow card) 90+7'	Stadium: SR-Bank Arena; Attendance: 15,800; Referee: Sivert Øksnes Amland

20 May 2024 9	Lillestrøm	0–3	Fredrikstad	Lillestrøm
17:00 CEST (UTC+2)	Røssing (yellow card) 84'; Ibrahimaj (yellow card) 90+1'	Report	Aukland (yellow card) 33'; Magnússon 41'; Aga 90' (pen.) (yellow card) 90'; Sørløkk 90+2'	Stadium: Åråsen Stadion; Attendance: 9,267; Referee: Ola Hobber Nilsen

26 May 2024 10	Odd	2–1	Lillestrøm	Skien
17:00 CEST (UTC+2)	Hussain (yellow card) 15'; Midtskogen 77'; Jørgensen (yellow card) 90+1'; Njie 90+5'	Report	Lundemo (yellow card) 11'; Garnås 90+6'	Stadium: Skagerak Arena; Attendance: 4,529; Referee: Daniel Higraff

2 June 2024 11	Tromsø	1–2	Lillestrøm	Tromsø
17:00 CEST (UTC+2)	Guddal 66' (yellow card) 74'; Norheim (yellow card) 71'	Report	Antonsen 20' (o.g.); Olsen 51'; Christiansen (yellow card) 90+1'	Stadium: Romssa Arena; Attendance: 5,154; Referee: Svein Tore Sinnes

27 June 2024 12	Lillestrøm	2–1	KFUM Oslo	Lillestrøm
21:15 CEST (UTC+2)	Garnås 19'; Vá (yellow card) 45+3'; Moen Foss 86'; Røssing-Lelesiit (yellow card) 90+6'	Report	Nuñez 48'; Akinyemi (yellow card) 82'; Aleesami (yellow card) 90+6'	Stadium: Åråsen Stadion; Attendance: 6,212; Referee: Mohammad Usman Aslam

7 July 2024 13	Molde	3–0	Lillestrøm	Molde
17:00 CEST (UTC+2)	Eriksen 13'; Hedenstad 24' (o.g.); Amundsen (yellow card) 51'; Løvik 67'; Dæhli (yellow card) 76'	Report	Lucky (yellow card) 64'	Stadium: Aker Stadion; Attendance: 7,050; Referee: Sivert Øksnes Amland

13 July 2024 14	Lillestrøm	3–1	Strømsgodset	Lillestrøm
17:00 CEST (UTC+2)	Lehne Olsen 15' (pen.); Kitolano 17'; Lundemo 47'; Vá (yellow card) 64'; Røssing-Lelesiit (yellow card) 90+2'	Report	Tómasson (yellow card) 24' (goal) 32'; Mehnert (yellow card) 39'	Stadium: Åråsen Stadion; Attendance: 5,918; Referee: Espen Eskås

28 July 2024 16	Lillestrøm	2–2	Sarpsborg 08	Lillestrøm
17:00 CEST (UTC+2)	Kitolano (yellow card) 39'; Lundemo (yellow card) 40' (goal) 90+6'; Gabrielsen 47'	Report	Meister 16', 38'; Johansen (yellow card) 45+2'; Sher (yellow card) 45+3'; Eriksson (yellow card) 61'; Hiim (yellow card) 90+6'	Stadium: Åråsen Stadion; Attendance: 6,387; Referee: Marius Hansen Grøtta

4 August 2024 17	Kristiansund	2–1	Lillestrøm	Molde
17:00 CEST (UTC+2)	Rakneberg 44'; Lien 49'; Lansing (yellow card) 90+4'	Report	Garnås (yellow card) 23'; Elkær 23'; Gabrielsen (yellow card) 53'	Stadium: Aker Stadion; Attendance: 3,374; Referee: Daniel Higraff

11 August 2024 18	Lillestrøm	1–2	Molde	Lillestrøm
19:15 CEST (UTC+2)	Ibrahimaj 10' (yellow card) 82'; Gabrielsen (yellow card) 45+2'; Garnås (yellow card) 72'; Charles (yellow card) 77'	Report	Ihler 45+1'; Breivik (yellow card) 64'; Eriksen 90+1'	Stadium: Åråsen Stadion; Attendance: 6,403; Referee: Tore Hansen

17 August 2024 19	Strømsgodset	3–2	Lillestrøm	Drammen
18:00 CEST (UTC+2)	Melkersen 6', 90+4'; Möller 72' (yellow card) 73'; Mehnert (yellow card) 80'	Report	Gabrielsen 5'; Hagerup (yellow card) 7'; Tønnessen (yellow card) 35'; Lehne Olsen 37' (pen.); Ibrahimaj (yellow card) 55'	Stadium: Marienlyst Stadion; Attendance: 5,006; Referee: Marius Lien

21 August 2024 15	Rosenborg	4–0	Lillestrøm	Trondheim
19:00 CEST (UTC+2)	Yttergård Jenssen (yellow card) 2'; Broholm 18'; Nypan 46', 72', 78' (pen.)	Report	Vá (yellow card) 27'	Stadium: Lerkendal Stadion; Attendance: 0 Referee: Ola Hobber Nilsen

25 August 2024 20	Lillestrøm	0–1	Tromsø	Lillestrøm
14:30 CEST (UTC+2)	Kitolano (yellow card) 5'; Moen Foss (yellow card) 60'; Gabrielsen (yellow card) ME'; Vestgård (red card) ME'	Report	Vik (yellow card) 15'; Erlien 23'; Cornic (yellow card) 45'; Nordås (yellow card) 50'; Skjærvik (yellow card) ME'	Stadium: Åråsen Stadion; Attendance: 7,315; Referee: Sivert Øksnes Amland

30 August 2024 21	KFUM Oslo	2–0	Lillestrøm	Oslo
19:00 CEST (UTC+2)	Rasch (yellow card) 4' (goal) 65' (pen.); Nuñez 88'	Report	Charles (yellow card) 23'; Vá (yellow card) 45' (yellow-red card) 63'; Elkær (yellow card) 74'	Stadium: KFUM Arena; Attendance: 3,216; Referee: Rohit Saggi

15 September 2024 22	Lillestrøm	1–1	Rosenborg	Lillestrøm
19:15 CEST (UTC+2)	Lehne Olsen 9'; Charles (yellow card) 23'; Larsson (yellow card) 68'	Report	Nemčík (yellow card) 22'; Holm 50'	Stadium: Åråsen Stadion; Attendance: 9,731; Referee: Sigurd Kringstad

21 September 2024 23	HamKam	5–0	Lillestrøm	Hamar
18:00 CEST (UTC+2)	Kongsro 11', 45+2'; Ofkir 16'; Mawa 33'; Sørås (yellow card) 73'; Bjarnason 88'	Report	Elkær (yellow card) 24'; Diop (yellow card) 60'	Stadium: Briskeby Stadion; Attendance: 4,719; Referee: Mohammad Usman Aslam

29 September 2024 24	Lillestrøm	1–4	Viking	Lillestrøm
17:00 CEST (UTC+2)	Garnås (yellow card) 40'; Ibrahimaj (yellow card) 63'; Vá 68'	Report	Christiansen 45+1', 66'; Heggheim 46'; Bell (yellow card) 52'; Svendsen 59'; Finndell (yellow card) 83'	Stadium: Åråsen Stadion; Attendance: 6,478; Referee: Svein Tore Sinnes

20 October 2024 25	Fredrikstad	2–1	Lillestrøm	Fredrikstad
19:15 CEST (UTC+2)	Sørløkk (yellow card) 22'; Rafn (yellow card) 43'; Bjørlo 51' (pen.); Kvile (yellow card) 56'; Kjær 78' (yellow card) 78'	Report	Gabrielsen (yellow card) 45+2' (goal) 59'; Jeahze (yellow card) 87'; Knudtzon (yellow card) 90+1'	Stadium: Fredrikstad Stadion; Attendance: 10,906; Referee: Sivert Øksnes Amland

27 October 2024 26	Lillestrøm	3–0	Odd	Lillestrøm
17:00 CET (UTC+1)	Vá 39', 73' (yellow card) 52'; Røssing 45+2'; Jeahze (yellow card) 78'	Report	Solholm Johansen (yellow card) 15'	Stadium: Åråsen Stadion; Attendance: 7,046; Referee: Tore Hansen

3 November 2024 27	Lillestrøm	0–1	Haugesund	Lillestrøm
17:00 CET (UTC+1)	Hoff (yellow card) 17'; Krygård (yellow card) 63'	Report	Bærtelsen (yellow card) 30'; Eskesen (yellow card) 45+3'; Diarra 65'; Innvær (yellow card) 84'; Selvik (yellow card) 86'; Krusnell (yellow card) 90+3'	Stadium: Åråsen Stadion; Attendance: 7,203; Referee: Rohit Saggi

9 November 2024 28	Brann	2–1	Lillestrøm	Bergen
18:00 CET (UTC+1)	Heggebø 45+2'; Castro 90+3' (pen.)	Report	Krygård (yellow card) 35'; Jeahze (yellow card) 45'; Lundemo (yellow card) 55'; Karlsbakk 58'	Stadium: Brann Stadion; Attendance: 16,569; Referee: Ola Hobber Nilsen

23 November 2024 29	Lillestrøm	0–3	Sandefjord	Lillestrøm
17:00 CET (UTC+1)	Røssing-Lelesiit (yellow card) 53'; Jeahze (yellow card) 90+4'	Report	Mettler 39'; Jemal 47'; Keto (yellow card) 80'; Melchior 89'	Stadium: Åråsen Stadion; Attendance: 6,217; Referee: Marius Hansen Grøtta

1 December 2024 30	Bodø/Glimt	5–2	Lillestrøm	Bodø
17:00 CET (UTC+1)	Berg 41'; Saltnes 45'; Høgh 52', 72'; Hauge 78'	Report	Larsson 12'; Lehne Olsen 48'; Roseth (yellow card) 82'	Stadium: Aspmyra Stadion; Attendance: 7,707; Referee: Tore Hansen

=== Norwegian Football Cup ===
10 April 2024 First round	Bjørkelangen	0–7	Lillestrøm	Bjørkelangen
18:00 CEST (UTC+2)	Grahn (yellow card) 31'; Holm Olsen (yellow card) 45'; Norheim-Bergquist (yellow card) 58'	Report	Garnås (yellow card) 5'; Furaha 19', 65'; Vá (yellow card) 31'; Skaarud 32' (pen.), 69'; Foss 42'; Seferi 55'; Lucky 59'	Stadium: Bjørkelangen kunstgress Attendance: 2,200; Referee: Eivind Bodding

24 April 2024 Second round	Strømmen	4–5	Lillestrøm	Strømmen
19:05 CEST (UTC+2)	Solberg (yellow card) 27'; Lunde 50'; Åsvestad (yellow card) 54' (goal) 76', 78', 87' (pen.); Balatoni (yellow card) 74'	Report	Lehne Olsen 6', 33', 40' (penalty missed) 40'; Vá 29'; Furaha 61'; Hagerup (yellow card) 90'	Stadium: Strømmen Stadion; Attendance: 1,286; Referee: Harald Vollstad Sletner

1 May 2024 Third round	Bodø/Glimt	2–4	Lillestrøm	Bodø
14:30 CEST (UTC+2)	Evjen 19'; Hauge 41'	Report	Åsen 4', 49' (yellow card) 88'; Vá 28'; Roseth (yellow card) 56'; Gabrielsen 63'	Stadium: Aspmyra Stadion; Attendance: 4,339; Referee: Ola Hobber Nilsen

9 May 2024 Fourth round	Strømsgodset	3–4 (a.e.t.)	Lillestrøm	Drammen
18:00 CEST (UTC+2)	Taaje (yellow card) 31'; E. U. Andersen 36', 69'; Stengel 45+2' (pen.); Vilsvik (yellow card) 59'; Farji 73'	Report	Lundemo 21'; Kitolano 34'; Vá 45'; Ibrahimaj (yellow card) 74'; Åsen 117'	Stadium: Marienlyst Stadion; Attendance: 4,336; Referee: Sigurd Smehus Kringstad

6 October 2024 Quarter-finals	Lillestrøm	1–2	Molde	Lillestrøm
18:00 CEST (UTC+2)	Røssing-Lelesiit 78'; Roseth (yellow card) 90+4'; Gabrielsen (yellow card) 90+6'	Report	Brynhildsen 29'; Ihler 88'; Løvik (yellow card) 90+5'; Dæhli (yellow card) 90+6'; Ødegård (yellow card) 90+6'; Hagelskjær (yellow card) 90+6'	Stadium: Åråsen Stadion; Attendance: 5,181; Referee: Espen Eskås
