= 2022 Norwegian Football Cup final =

- Event: 2022 Norwegian Football Cup
Brann	Lillestrøm
2	0
- Date: 20 May 2023
- Venue: Ullevaal Stadion, Oslo
- Referee: Tore Hansen
- Attendance: 25,532

The 2022 Norwegian Football Cup final was the final match of the 2022 Norwegian Football Cup, the 116th season of the Norwegian Football Cup, the premier Norwegian football cup competition organized by the Football Association of Norway (NFF). The match was played on 20 May 2023 at the Ullevaal Stadion in Oslo, between Eliteserien teams Brann and Lillestrøm.

== Route to the final ==
Note: In all results below, the score of the finalist is given first.

Brann		Round	Lillestrøm	
Voss (D4); A 7–0	Finne 3', 36', 56', Blomberg 50', Trengereid 63', 78', Haaland 66'	First round	Eidsvold (D4); A 7–0	Adams 22', Holst 31', Ranger 46', Fridjónsson 51', 66', 68', Mathew 67'
Os (D3); A 6–1	Finne 18', 29', 57', 87', Mikkelsen 34' (o.g.), Hilton 90+1' (o.g.)	Second round	Junkeren (D3); A 2–1	Friðjónsson 23', Helland 45+1'
Fredrikstad (D1); H 6–0	Castro 10' (pen.), 42', Myhre 47', 58', Heggebø 87', Wassberg 90'	Third round	Aalesund (D1); H 1–0	Friðjónsson 45+1'
Haugesund (ES); H 3–1	Finne 10', 71', Rasmussen 11'	Fourth round	Sogndal (D1); A 2–1	Adams 2', Olsen 71'
Sandefjord (ES); H 3–0	Myhre 21', Wolfe 25', Rasmussen 37'	Quarter-final	Tromsø (ES); A 3–2 (a.e.t.)	Olsen 48'. Åsen 71', Jenssen 111' (o.g.)
Stabæk (ES); A 2–0	Heggebø 20', Finne 59'	Semi-final	Bodø/Glimt (ES); H 1–0	Olsen 45'

Key:

- ES = Eliteserien team
- D1 = 1. divisjon team
- D2 = 2. divisjon team
- D3 = 3. divisjon team
- D4 = 4. divisjon team
- H = Home
- A = Away
- a.e.t. = After extra time

== Match ==
=== Details ===
20 May 2023
16:00 CEST (UTC+2)

Brann	2–0	Lillestrøm
Blomberg 16'; Finne 62'	Report

Ullevaal Stadion, Oslo
Attendance: 25,532
Referee: Tore Hansen (Feda)

Brann	Lillestrøm

Brann:
GK	1	(Norway) Mathias Dyngeland
RB	13	(Denmark) Svenn Crone
CB	6	(Denmark) Japhet Larsen
CB	21	(Norway) Ruben Kristiansen	(substituted off) 77'
LB	18	(Norway) David Møller Wolfe
RM	7	(Norway) Mathias Rasmussen
CM	19	(Norway) Sivert Nilsen (c)
LM	8	(Norway) Felix Horn Myhre
RW	16	(Norway) Ole Didrik Blomberg	(substituted off) 90+3'
CF	11	(Norway) Bård Finne	(substituted off) 90+2'
LW	10	(Denmark) Frederik Børsting	(substituted off) 77'
Substitutions:
GK	12	(Norway) Eirik Johansen
DF	3	(Norway) Fredrik Knudsen	(substituted in) 77'
FW	9	(Chile) Niklas Castro	(substituted in) 90+2'
FW	23	(Norway) Thore Pedersen	(substituted in) 90+3'
MF	25	(Norway) Niklas Wassberg	(substituted in) 77'
MF	31	(Norway) Isak Hjorteseth
MF	33	(Norway) Marius Trengereid
FW	41	(Norway) Elias Myrlid
DF	43	(Norway) Rasmus Holten
Head Coach:
(Norway) Eirik Horneland

Lillestrøm:
GK	12	(Norway) Mads Christiansen
RB	4	(Norway) Espen Garnås		(substituted off) 70'
CB	28	(Norway) Ruben Gabrielsen
LB	20	(Norway) Vetle Skjærvik
RM	2	(Norway) Lars Ranger	(yellow card) 18'	(substituted off) 28'
CM	5	(Norway) Vetle Dragsnes		(substituted off) 79'
CM	7	(Kosovo) Ylldren Ibrahimaj		(substituted off) 70'
CM	6	(Norway) Vebjørn Hoff
LM	23	(Norway) Gjermund Åsen (c)		(substituted off) 70'
CF	10	(Norway) Thomas Lehne Olsen
CF	9	(Nigeria) Akor Adams
Substitutions:
GK	1	(Norway) Knut-André Skjærstein
MF	14	(Norway) Magnus Knudsen		(substituted in) 70'
FW	16	(Nigeria) Uba Charles
DF	19	(Norway) Kristoffer Tønnessen		(substituted in) 70'
DF	21	(Norway) Andreas Vindheim	(substituted in) 79'	(yellow card) 84'
DF	22	(Norway) Philip Slørdahl
FW	24	(Norway) Tobias Svendsen		(substituted in) 70'
MF	25	(Norway) Eskil Edh		(substituted in) 28'
MF	37	(Norway) Leandro Neto
Head Coach:
(Norway) Geir Bakke

MATCH OFFICIALS

- Assistant referees:
  - Ole Andreas Skogsrud Haukåsen (Ridabu)
  - Magnus Lundberg (Ringsaker)
- Fourth official: Sigurd Smehus Kringstad (Valder)

MATCH RULES

- 90 minutes.
- 30 minutes of extra-time if necessary.
- Penalty shoot-out if scores still level.
- Nine named substitutes.
- Maximum of five substitutions.
