= 2023 Lillestrøm SK season =

Lillestrøm
2023 season
- Chairman: Morten Kokkim
- Head coach: Geir Bakke (until 12 July); Simon Mesfin (interim) (12 July - 10 August); Eirik Bakke (from 10 August)
- Stadium: Åråsen Stadion
- Eliteserien: 6th
- 2022 Norwegian Cup: Runners-up
- 2023 Norwegian Cup: Second round
- Top goalscorer: League: Akor Adams (15); All: Akor Adams (17)
Home colours	Away colours

The 2023 season was Lillestrøm SK's 106th season in existence and the club's third consecutive season in the top flight of Norwegian football. In addition to the domestic league, Lillestrøm SK participated in this season's edition of the Norwegian Football Cup.

== Players ==
=== First team squad ===
As of 5 May 2023

Note: Flags indicate national team as defined under FIFA eligibility rules; some limited exceptions apply. Players may hold more than one non-FIFA nationality.

No.	Pos.	Nation	Player
2	DF	NOR	Lars Ranger
3	DF	NOR	Martin Ove Roseth
4	DF	NOR	Espen Garnås
5	DF	USA	Sam Rogers
6	MF	NOR	Vebjørn Hoff
7	MF	KOS	Ylldren Ibrahimaj
8	MF	NOR	Marius Lundemo
10	FW	NOR	Thomas Lehne Olsen
11	DF	DEN	Frederik Elkær
12	GK	NOR	Mads Hedenstad Christiansen
14	MF	CIV	Mathis Bolly
15	MF	CAN	Kosi Thompson (on loan from Toronto FC)

No.	Pos.	Nation	Player
16	MF	NGR	Uba Charles Nwokoma
17	MF	NOR	Elias Solberg
19	DF	NOR	Kristoffer Tønnessen
20	DF	NOR	Vetle Skjærvik
22	DF	NOR	Philip Slørdahl
23	MF	NOR	Gjermund Åsen (Captain)
25	MF	NOR	Eskil Edh
28	DF	NOR	Ruben Gabrielsen
29	GK	NOR	Jørgen Sveinhaug
33	FW	NOR	Henrik Skogvold

=== Out on loan ===
Note: Flags indicate national team as defined under FIFA eligibility rules; some limited exceptions apply. Players may hold more than one non-FIFA nationality.

No.	Pos.	Nation	Player
—	FW	NOR	Uranik Seferi (at Strømmen until 30 November 2023)
—	MF	NOR	Dylan Murugesapillai (at Træff until 30 November 2023)

No.	Pos.	Nation	Player
—	MF	NOR	Martin Bergum (at Strømmen until 30 November 2023)

== Transfers ==
=== Winter ===
In: Note: Flags indicate national team as defined under FIFA eligibility rules; some limited exceptions apply. Players may hold more than one non-FIFA nationality.

No.	Pos.	Nation	Player
3	DF	NOR	Martin Ove Roseth (from Sogndal)
6	MF	NOR	Vebjørn Hoff (from Rosenborg)
16	MF	NGR	Uba Charles Nwokoma (from (Sweden) Ljungskile)
19	DF	NOR	Kristoffer Tønnessen (from Start)
20	DF	NOR	Vetle Skjærvik (from Hamkam)
21	DF	NOR	Andreas Vindheim (on loan from (Czech Republic) Sparta Prague)
22	DF	NOR	Philip Slørdahl (loan return from Sogndal)
24	FW	NOR	Tobias Svendsen (return from hiatus)
28	DF	NOR	Ruben Gabrielsen (from (United States) Austin)
–	DF	NOR	Marcus Paulsen (promoted from junior squad)

Out: Note: Flags indicate national team as defined under FIFA eligibility rules; some limited exceptions apply. Players may hold more than one non-FIFA nationality.

No.	Pos.	Nation	Player
3	DF	NOR	Colin Rösler (to (Sweden) Mjällby)
6	MF	FIN	Kaan Kairinen (to (Czech Republic) Sparta Prague)
7	FW	NOR	Pål André Helland (retired)
18	MF	NOR	Ulrik Mathisen (to Brann, previously on loan at Sogndal)
21	FW	ISL	Hólmbert Friðjónsson (loan return to (Germany) Holstein Kiel)
24	DF	SWE	Tom Pettersson (to (Sweden) Mjällby)
26	MF	NOR	Dylan Murugesapillai (on loan to Træff)
27	DF	CIV	Ibrahim Cissé (loan return to (Ivory Coast) Zoman)
29	GK	NOR	Jørgen Sveinhaug (on loan to Grorud)
30	DF	NGR	Igoh Ogbu (to (Czech Republic) Slavia Prague)
31	MF	NOR	Martin Bergum (on loan to Strømmen, previously on loan at Ull/Kisa)
33	FW	NOR	Henrik Skogvold (on loan to Start)
58	FW	DEN	Aral Şimşir (loan return to (Denmark) Midtjylland)
77	MF	DEN	Frederik Holst (to (Sweden) Helsingborg)
–	FW	NOR	Uranik Seferi (on loan to Strømmen, previously on loan at Kvik Halden)
–	DF	NOR	Marcus Paulsen (on loan to Strømmen)

=== Summer ===
In: Note: Flags indicate national team as defined under FIFA eligibility rules; some limited exceptions apply. Players may hold more than one non-FIFA nationality.

No.	Pos.	Nation	Player
5	DF	USA	Sam Rogers (from Rosenborg)
11	DF	DEN	Frederik Elkær (from (Denmark) Hobro)
14	FW	CIV	Mathis Bolly (free transfer)
15	MF	CAN	Kosi Thompson (from (Canada) Toronto)
29	GK	NOR	Jørgen Sveinhaug (loan return from Grorud)
33	FW	NOR	Henrik Skogvold (loan return from Start)

Out: Note: Flags indicate national team as defined under FIFA eligibility rules; some limited exceptions apply. Players may hold more than one non-FIFA nationality.

No.	Pos.	Nation	Player
1	GK	NOR	Knut-André Skjærstein (on loan to Egersund)
5	DF	NOR	Vetle Dragsnes (to (Belgium) Charleroi)
9	FW	NGR	Akor Adams (to (France) Montpellier)
14	MF	NOR	Magnus Knudsen (loan return to (Russia) Rostov)
21	DF	NOR	Andreas Vindheim (loan return to (Czech Republic) Sparta Prague)
24	FW	NOR	Tobias Svendsen (to Odd)

== Pre-season and friendlies ==
Win Draw Loss Fixtures

27 January 2023 Friendly	Lillestrøm (Norway)	2–1	(Norway) Sandefjord	Lillestrøm
14:00 CET (UTC+1)	Taaje 3' (o.g.); Skogvold 75'; Garnås (yellow card) 86'	Report	Al-Saed 36'; Bikoro (yellow card) 86'	Stadium: LSK-Hallen; Attendance: 400; Referee: Anders Bodding

3 February 2023 Friendly	Lillestrøm (Norway)	2–2	(Norway) Stabæk	Lillestrøm
14:00 CET (UTC+1)	Mathisen 24'; Ranger (yellow card) 82'; Lundemo 84'; Charles (yellow card) 86'	Report	Høgh 19'; Pedersen (yellow card) 66'; Schie 68'	Stadium: LSK-Hallen; Attendance: 500; Referee: Jørgen Haugen

10 February 2023 Friendly	Lillestrøm (Norway)	3–2	(Norway) HamKam	Lillestrøm
14:00 CET (UTC+1)	Adams 26'; Ibrahimaj 43'; Jendal 58' (o.g.)	Report	Udahl 39', 52'; Kjærgaard (yellow card) 85'	Stadium: LSK-Hallen; Attendance: 400; Referee: Jørgen Haugen

17 February 2023 Friendly	Lillestrøm (Norway)	2–2	(Estonia) Flora	Lillestrøm
14:00 CET (UTC+1)	Slørdahl 68'; Ibrahimaj 75'		Alliku 63'; Miller 80'; Kuraksin (yellow card) 83'	Stadium: LSK-Hallen; Referee: Eivind Bodding

26 February 2023 Friendly	Viking (Norway)	2–2 (4–5 p)	(Norway) Lillestrøm	San Pedro de Alcántara, Spain
13:00 CET (UTC+1)	Austbø 27'; Haugen 45+2'; Stensness (yellow card) 57' de Lanlay (yellow card) 73'		Lehne Olsen 19'; Mathisen (yellow card) 41'; Adams 47'; Knudsen (yellow card) 63'	Stadium: Marbella Football Center; Attendance: 80; Referee: Sigurd Kringstad
	Penalties
	de Lanlay (penalty scored); Kabran (penalty scored); Vevatne (penalty scored); Pattynama (penalty missed); S. Svendsen (penalty scored); Solbakken (penalty missed)		(penalty scored) Knudsen; (penalty scored) Ranger; (penalty scored) T. Svendsen; (penalty scored) Tønnessen; (penalty missed) Skogvold; (penalty scored) Dragsnes

3 March 2023 Friendly	Haugesund (Norway)	1–4	(Norway) Lillestrøm	San Pedro de Alcántara, Spain
16:00 CET (UTC+1)	Pajaziti (yellow card) 15'; Njie 35'	Report	Dragsnes 14'; Lehne Olsen 23'; Adams 42'; Skjærvik (yellow card) 73'; Svendsen 90'	Stadium: Marbella Football Center

1 April 2023 Friendly	Odd (Norway)	0–2	(Norway) Lillestrøm	Skien
15:00 CEST (UTC+2)	Wahlstedt (yellow card) 52'		Knudsen (yellow card) 34'; Åsen 53' (pen.); Ibrahimaj 61'	Stadium: Skagerak Arena; Attendance: 416; Referee: Marius Lien

25 August 2023 Friendly	Strømsgodset (Norway)	2–1	(Norway) Lillestrøm	Drammen
12:00 CEST (UTC+2)	Sørmo 16'; Krasniqi (yellow card) 36'; Stenevik 50'		Lehne Olsen 37'	Stadium: Marienlyst Stadion; Attendance: 100

7 September 2023 Friendly	Lillestrøm (Norway)	2–1	(Norway) Kongsvinger	Lillestrøm
12:00 CEST (UTC+2)	Lehne Olsen 19' (pen.); Skogvold 45'		Holter 75'	Stadium: Åråsen Stadion; Attendance: 200; Referee: Jørgen Haugen

== Competitions ==
=== Overview ===
Competition	First match	Last match	Starting round	Final position	Record							
Competition	First match	Last match	Starting round	Final position	Pld	W	D	L	GF	GA	GD	Win %
Eliteserien	10 April 2023	3 December 2023	Matchday 1	6th	30	13	4	13	49	49	+0	43.33
2022 Norwegian Cup	12 March 2023	20 May 2023	Fourth round	Runners-up	4	3	0	1	6	5	+1	75.00
2023 Norwegian Cup	24 May 2023	1 June 2023	First round	Second round	2	1	0	1	6	3	+3	50.00
Total					36	17	4	15	61	57	+4	47.22

Last updated: 3 December 2023
Source: Soccerway

=== Eliteserien ===
==== League table ====
Pos	Team	Pld	W	D	L	GF	GA	GD	Pts	Qualification or relegation
4	Viking	30	18	4	8	61	48	+13	58	
5	Molde	30	15	6	9	65	39	+26	51	Qualification for the Europa League second qualifying round (Note: Molde qualified for the Europa League second qualifying round by winning the 2023 Norwegian Football Cup.)
6	Lillestrøm	30	13	4	13	49	49	0	43	
7	Strømsgodset	30	13	3	14	37	35	+2	42	
8	Sarpsborg	30	12	5	13	55	52	+3	41	

Source: Football Association of Norway (in Norwegian)
Rules for classification: 1) Points; 2) Goal difference; 3) Goals scored; 4) Head-to-head points; 5) Head-to-head goal difference; 6) Head-to-head goals scored.

==== Results summary ====
Overall								Home						Away					
Pld	W	D	L	GF	GA	GD	Pts	W	D	L	GF	GA	GD	W	D	L	GF	GA	GD
30	13	4	13	49	49	0	43	9	1	5	34	23	+11	4	3	8	15	26	−11

Last updated: 3 December 2023.

==== Results by round ====
Round	1	2	3	4	5	6	7	8	9	10	11	12	13	14	15	16	17	18	19	20	21	22	23	24	25	26	27	28	29	30
Ground	H	A	H	A	H	A	H	A	H	A	H	H	A	H	A	H	A	H	A	H	A	A	H	A	H	A	H	A	H	A
Result	W	L	W	W	L	W	L	D	W	D	H	L	D	W	L	W	L	L	W	L	D	L	W	L	W	L	W	L	D	L
Position	4	10	4	2	3	2	4	7	4	5	4	6	4	4	5	5	5	6	6	6	6	7	6	7	6	6	6	6	6	6

A = Away; H = Home; W = Win; D = Draw; L = Loss

==== Matches ====
The league fixtures were announced on 9 December 2022.

15 April 2023 2	Viking	2–0	Lillestrøm	Stavanger
18:00 CEST (UTC+2)	Salvesen (yellow card) 69'; Bjørshol 76'; Yazbek 90+4'	Report	Garnås (yellow card) 68'; Ranger (yellow card) 74'; Hoff (yellow card) 85'	Stadium: Stavanger Stadion; Attendance: 15,231; Referee: Mohammad Usman Aslam

19 April 2023 1	Lillestrøm	4–3	Strømsgodset	Lillestrøm
18:30 CEST (UTC+2)	Garnås 23'; Lehne Olsen 25'; Åsen 84'; Adams 90+5' (yellow card) 90+6'	Report	Jack 32'; Valsvik 39'; Mehnert 76' (yellow card) 77'; Therkelsen (yellow card) 87'	Stadium: Åråsen Stadion; Attendance: 8,870; Referee: Tore Hansen

23 April 2023 3	Lillestrøm	2–1	Molde	Lillestrøm
19:15 CEST (UTC+2)	Tønnessen 5'; Adams 37'; Ranger (yellow card) 90+1'	Report	Breivik 35'; Eikrem (red card) 40'	Stadium: Åråsen Stadion; Attendance: 5,955; Referee: Ola Hobber Nilsen

1 May 2023 4	Vålerenga	3–4	Lillestrøm	Oslo
18:00 CEST (UTC+2)	Håkans 7'; Bjørdal 27'; Jatta 30'; Juklerød (red card) 37'	Report	Lehne Olsen 17'; Adams 46', 90+6'; Åsen 89'	Stadium: Intility Arena; Attendance: 16,556; Referee: Kristoffer Hagenes

7 May 2023 5	Lillestrøm	1–2	Bodø/Glimt	Lillestrøm
19:15 CEST (UTC+2)	Adams 60'; Gabrielsen (yellow card) 90+5'	Report	Pemi 52', 71' (yellow card) 56'; Vetlesen (yellow card) 84'; Sjøvold (yellow card) 86'	Stadium: Åråsen Stadion; Attendance: 8,070; Referee: Rohit Saggi

1 May 2023 6	Odd	0–1	Lillestrøm	Skien
19:00 CEST (UTC+2)	Hagen (yellow card) 71'	Report	Garnås (yellow card) 35'; Hoff (yellow card) 53'; Adams 90+3'	Stadium: Skagerak Arena; Attendance: 6,396; Referee: Svein Tore Sinnes

16 May 2023 7	Lillestrøm	1–2	Sarpsborg 08	Lillestrøm
18:00 CEST (UTC+2)	Adams 90+4'	Report	Utvik 47'; Soltvedt 54'; Baah (yellow card) 56'; Andersen (yellow card) 77'; Skålevik (yellow card) 90+5'	Stadium: Åråsen Stadion; Attendance: 9,029; Referee: Espen Eskås

29 May 2023 8	HamKam	0–0	Lillestrøm	Hamar
19:15 CEST (UTC+2)		Report	Slørdahl (yellow card) 90'	Stadium: Briskeby Stadion; Attendance: 3,695; Referee: Daniel Higraff

4 June 2023 9	Lillestrøm	3–1	Stabæk	Lillestrøm
17:00 CEST (UTC+2)	Adams 13', 86' (pen.), 90+2'; Hedenstad (yellow card) 18'	Report	Bakenga 21' (pen.); Skovgaard (yellow card) 28'	Stadium: Åråsen Stadion; Attendance: 5,823; Referee: Sivert Øksnes Amland

11 June 2023 10	Brann	2–2	Lillestrøm	Bergen
19:15 CEST (UTC+2)	Nilsen 57' (pen.) (penalty missed) 89'; Castro 60'; Børsting (yellow card) 71'; Myhre (yellow card) 84'	Report	Edh 24' (yellow card) 56'; Garnås (yellow card) 36'; Tønnessen 74'; Skogvold (yellow card) 90'	Stadium: Brann Stadion; Attendance: 15,712; Referee: Rohit Saggi

2 July 2023 12	Lillestrøm	0–1	Tromsø	Lillestrøm
17:00 CEST (UTC+2)		Report	Traoré 50'; Hjertø-Dahl (yellow card) 87'	Stadium: Åråsen Stadion; Attendance: 6,637; Referee: Ola Hobber Nilsen

9 July 2023 13	Rosenborg	1–2	Lillestrøm	Trondheim
17:00 CEST (UTC+2)	Sæter 11'	Report	Adams 85', 90+2' (pen.)	Stadium: Lerkendal Stadion; Attendance: 12,064; Referee: Sivert Øksnes Amland

16 July 2023 14	Lillestrøm	4–2	Sandefjord	Lillestrøm
17:00 CEST (UTC+2)	Lehne Olsen 9', 68'; Adams 18', 38'; Skjærvik (yellow card) 85'	Report	Ayer 11'; Taaje 70'; Smeulers (yellow card) 80'; Dunsby (yellow card) 90+2'	Stadium: Åråsen Stadion; Attendance: 5,835; Referee: Sigurd Smehus Kringstad

19 July 2023 11	Lillestrøm	5–1	Aalesund	Lillestrøm
18:00 CEST (UTC+2)	Ibrahimaj 30' (yellow card) 33'; Skjærvik 31'; Garnås (yellow card) 46'; Adams 56'; Lehne Olsen 78', 81'	Report	Atanga 11'; Diop (red card) 23'	Stadium: Åråsen Stadion; Attendance: 5,853; Referee: Kristoffer Hagenes

23 July 2023 15	Haugesund	1–0	Lillestrøm	Haugesund
17:00 CEST (UTC+2)	Reese 76'	Report	Hoff (yellow card) 74'; Adams (yellow card) 90+5' (yellow-red card) 90+7'	Stadium: Haugesund Stadion; Attendance: 3,860; Referee: Marius Hansen Grøtta

30 July 2023 16	Lillestrøm	3–1	HamKam	Lillestrøm
17:00 CEST (UTC+2)	Åsen 23'; Dragsnes 36'; Ranger (yellow card) 63'; Skogvold 83' (pen.); Christiansen (yellow card) 88'	Report	Udahl 35'	Stadium: Åråsen Stadion; Attendance: 6,790; Referee: Daniel Higraff

6 August 2023 17	Tromsø	3–1	Lillestrøm	Tromsø
17:00 CEST (UTC+2)	Gundersen (yellow card) 23' (goal) 66'; Erlien 72' (pen.); Paintsil 89'	Report	Svendsen (yellow card) 25'; Garnås 45' (yellow card) 51'	Stadium: Romssa Arena; Attendance: 5,381; Referee: Sivert Øksnes Amland

13 August 2023 18	Lillestrøm	1–3	Viking	Lillestrøm
17:00 CEST (UTC+2)	Lehne Olsen 90+1'	Report	Haugen (yellow card) 36'; D'Agostino 52'; Salvesen 68'; Solbakken 83'; Diop (yellow card) 90+4'	Stadium: Åråsen Stadion; Attendance: 7,466; Referee: Rohit Saggi

20 August 2023 19	Strømsgodset	1–2	Lillestrøm	Drammen
19:15 CEST (UTC+2)	Myhra (yellow card) 81'; Dahl (yellow card) 81'; Melkersen 87'	Report	Ibrahimaj 34'; Edh (yellow card) 45+2'; Lehne Olsen 49'	Stadium: Marienlyst Stadion; Attendance: 6,020; Referee: Sigurd Smehus Kringstad

3 September 2023 21	Aalesund	1–1	Lillestrøm	Ålesund
17:00 CEST (UTC+2)	Hammer (yellow card) 8'; Kristensen 64'	Report	Lehne Olsen 12'	Stadium: Color Line Stadion; Attendance: 4,418; Referee: Daniel Higraff

17 September 2023 22	Sarpsborg 08	3–1	Lillestrøm	Sarpsborg
17:00 CEST (UTC+2)	Christiansen 32'; Berget 40'; Ngouali 74'; Haug (yellow card) 88'	Report	Garnås (yellow card) 26'; Lehne Olsen 62'; Ibrahimaj (yellow card) 73'	Stadium: Sarpsborg Stadion; Attendance: 5,498; Referee: Kristoffer Hagenes

24 September 2023 23	Lillestrøm	3–0	Rosenborg	Lillestrøm
17:00 CEST (UTC+2)	Tønnessen 41'; Lehne Olsen (yellow card) 45+3' (goal) 59', 65'	Report	Thorvaldsson (yellow card) 22'; Selnæs (yellow card) 26'; Nelson (yellow card) 53' (yellow-red card) 66'; Hansen (yellow card) 56'	Stadium: Åråsen Stadion; Attendance: 9,301; Referee: Ola Hobber Nilsen

1 October 2023 20	Lillestrøm	0–2	Brann	Lillestrøm
15:00 CEST (UTC+2)	Rogers (yellow card) 22'; Ibrahimaj (yellow card) 22'; Thompson (yellow card) 27'; Edh (yellow card) 57'; Gabrielsen (yellow card) 68'; Garnås (yellow card) 75'	Report	Nilsen 31' (pen.); Larsen (yellow card) 32'; Pedersen (yellow card) 42'; Mathisen 47'	Stadium: Åråsen Stadion; Attendance: 9,358; Referee: Mohammad Usman Aslam

8 October 2023 24	Stabæk	1–0	Lillestrøm	Bærum
17:00 CEST (UTC+2)	Wangberg 73'; Walstad (yellow card) 83'	Report	Bolly (yellow card) 83'	Stadium: Nadderud Stadion; Attendance: 3,314; Referee: Svein Oddvar Moen

22 October 2023 25	Lillestrøm	2–0	Vålerenga	Lillestrøm
14:30 CEST (UTC+2)	Roseth 27'; Skogvold (yellow card) 64'; Bolly 69'	Report	Bitri (yellow card) 24'	Stadium: Åråsen Stadion; Attendance: 10,540; Referee: Rohit Saggi

30 October 2023 26	Bodø/Glimt	3–1	Lillestrøm	Bodø
18:30 CET (UTC+1)	Moe 6'; Pellegrino 63'; Wembangomo 76'	Report	Lundemo (yellow card) 4'; Bakke (yellow card) 59'; Roseth 68'	Stadium: Aspmyra Stadion; Attendance: 5,832; Referee: Kai Erik Steen

5 November 2023 27	Lillestrøm	1–0	Haugesund	Lillestrøm
17:00 CET (UTC+1)	Gabrielsen (yellow card) 36'; Ibrahimaj (yellow card) 44'; Garnås 57'	Report	Eskesen (yellow card) 33'	Stadium: Åråsen Stadion; Attendance: 7,003; Referee: Sigurd Smehus Kringstad

12 November 2023 28	Molde	4–0	Lillestrøm	Molde
19:15 CET (UTC+1)	Gabrielsen 4' (o.g.); Berisha 11', 23'; Hestad 88'	Report	Skogvold (yellow card) 56'	Stadium: Aker Stadion; Attendance: 5,440; Referee: Tore Hansen

26 November 2023 29	Lillestrøm	4–4	Odd	Lillestrøm
17:00 CET (UTC+1)	Åsen 31'; Lehne Olsen 74', 90+12' (pen.); Gabrielsen 76' (yellow card) 86'	Report	Jørgensen 2', 25'; Baccay (yellow card) 18'; Ingebrigtsen 41', 82'; Ruud (yellow card) 60'; L. Owusu (yellow card) 87'; Bråtveit (yellow card) 90+2'; S. Owusu (yellow card) 90+12'	Stadium: Åråsen Stadion; Attendance: 6,025; Referee: Svein Tore Sinnes

3 December 2023 30	Sandefjord	1–0	Lillestrøm	Sandefjord
17:00 CET (UTC+1)	Tveter 43' (pen.)	Report		Stadium: Release Arena; Attendance: 3,757; Referee: Svein Oddvar Moen

=== Norwegian Football Cup ===
==== 2022 ====
12 March 2023 Fourth round	Sogndal	1–2	Lillestrøm	Sogndalsfjøra
17:00 CET (UTC+1)	Arrocha 31'; Sjølstad (yellow card) 53'; Díaz (yellow card) 78'	Report	Adams 2'; Lehne Olsen 71'; Garnås (yellow card) 78'; Skjærvik (yellow card) 90+2'	Stadium: Fosshaugane Campus; Attendance: 1,409; Referee: Kai Erik Steen

19 March 2023 Quarter-finals	Tromsø	2–3 (a.e.t.)	Lillestrøm	Tromsø
17:00 CET (UTC+1)	Opsahl 32'; Mikaelsson 60'; Diouf (yellow card) 94'; Jenssen (yellow card) 116'	Report	Adams (yellow card) 41'; Lehne Olsen 48' (pen.); Ibrahimaj (yellow card) 51'; Åsen 71'; Jenssen 111' (o.g.); Ranger (yellow card) 120'	Stadium: Romssa Arena; Attendance: 2,331; Referee: Ola Hobber Nilsen

26 April 2023 Semi-finals	Lillestrøm	1–0	Bodø/Glimt	Lillestrøm
20:15 CEST (UTC+2)	Lehne Olsen 45'; Adams (yellow card) 87'; Tønnessen (yellow card) 87'	Report	Berg (yellow card) 68'	Stadium: Åråsen stadion Attendance: 6,200; Referee: Espen Eskås

20 May 2023 Final	Brann	2–0	Lillestrøm	Oslo
16:00 CEST (UTC+2)	Blomberg 16'; Finne 62'	Report	Ranger (yellow card) 17'; Vindheim (yellow card) 83'	Stadium: Ullevaal Stadion; Attendance: 25,532; Referee: Tore Hansen

==== 2023 ====
24 May 2023 First round	Skedsmo	0–4	Lillestrøm	Skedsmokorset
19:35 CEST (UTC+2)	Myhre (yellow card) 75'; Evensen (yellow card) 87'	Report	Skjærstein (red card) 53'; Svendsen 61', 77', 78'; Slørdahl 84'	Stadium: Skedsmo Stadion; Attendance: 1,500; Referee: Ali al Hatam

1 June 2023 Second round	Ull/Kisa	3–2 (a.e.t.)	Lillestrøm	Jessheim
18:00 CEST (UTC+2)	Hammershaug 10'; Sundgot 34'; Blårud (yellow card) 84'; Nyhagen 94' (yellow card) 117'; Bjørkkjær (yellow card) 113'; Kvernstuen (yellow card) 114'	Report	Svendsen (yellow card) 65'; Adams 74', 90+2'; Hedenstad (yellow card) 120'	Stadium: Jessheim Stadion; Attendance: 1,576; Referee: Magnus Nicolai Koløy
