= Kristoffer Tønnessen =

Norwegian footballer (born 1997)

Personal information
- Date of birth: 1 October 1997 (age 29)
- Place of birth: Grimstad Municipality, Norway
- Height: 1.85 m (6 ft 1 in)
- Position: Defender

Team information
- Current team: Start
- Number: 19

Youth career
- –2015: Jerv

Senior career*
Years	Team	Apps	(Gls)
2013–2015	Jerv 2	9	(3)
2013–2019	Jerv	120	(2)
2019–2022	Start	93	(7)
2023–2025	Lillestrøm	57	(5)
2026–	Start	5	(0)

International career^{‡}
2017	Norway U21	2	(0)
- * Club domestic league appearances and goals as of 23 July 2026 ‡ National team caps and goals as of 3 February 2026

Kristoffer Tønnessen (born 1 October 1997) is a Norwegian football defender who plays for Start.

== Career ==
He made his league debut for Jerv in the 2013 3. divisjon, and took part in successive promotions to the 2016 1. divisjon. At the end of the season, Jerv was only minutes away from yet another promotion, but ultimately lost the decisive playoff match.

In the summer of 2019, Tønnessen signed a four-year contract with Start. His first game for the club came against Sogndal in a 1–0 win. Before leaving the club Tønnessen made one hundred appearances for the club across all competitions.

Ahead of the 2023 season he went to Lillestrøm on a three-year contract. Only months after the move, Tønnessen featured in the 2022–23 Norwegian Football Cup final, where Lillestrøm lost to Brann.

After the 2025 season, Start announced that Tønnessen had signed with them from the 2026 season. The move saw Tønnessen return to his former club three years after leaving at the end of 2022.

== International career ==
Tønnessen appeared twice for the Norway U21 in 2017.

== Career statistics ==
As of 22 August 2026

Appearances and goals by club, season and competition
Club	Season	League			National Cup		Other		Total	
Club	Season	Division	Apps	Goals	Apps	Goals	Apps	Goals	Apps	Goals
Jerv 2	2013	4. divisjon	1	0	—		—		1	0
Jerv 2	2014	4. divisjon	2	1	—		—		2	1
Jerv 2	2015	4. divisjon	6	2	—		—		6	2
Jerv 2	Total		9	3	—		—		9	3
Jerv	2013	3. divisjon	12	0	0	0	—		12	0
Jerv	2014	2. divisjon	2	0	0	0	—		2	0
Jerv	2016	1. divisjon	29	1	2	0	4 (Note: Appearance(s) in 1. divisjon promotion play-offs)	0	35	1
Jerv	2017	1. divisjon	29	0	4	0	—		33	0
Jerv	2018	1. divisjon	28	1	0	0	—		28	1
Jerv	2019	1. divisjon	20	0	2	0	—		22	0
Jerv	Total		120	2	8	0	4	0	132	2
Start	2019	1. divisjon	4	0	0	0	0	0	4	0
Start	2020	Eliteserien	29	1	—		—		29	1
Start	2021	1. divisjon	30	2	3	1	1	0	34	3
Start	2022	1. divisjon	30	4	2	1	1	0	33	5
Start	Total		93	7	5	2	2	0	100	9
Lillestrøm	2023	Eliteserien	20	3	4	0	—		24	3
Lillestrøm	2024	Eliteserien	15	0	4	0	—		19	0
Lillestrøm	2025	1. divisjon	22	2	8	0	—		30	2
Lillestrøm	Total		57	5	16	0	—		73	5
Start	2026	Eliteserien	5	0	0	0	0	0	5	0
Career total			284	17	29	2	6	0	319	19

== Honours ==
Lillestrøm

- Norwegian Cup: 2025; runner-up: 2022
