= 2026 Aalesunds FK season =

Aalesund
2026 season
- Chairman: Jan Petter Hagen
- Head coach: Kjetil Rekdal
- Stadium: Color Line Stadion
- Eliteserien: 13th
- 2025–26 Norwegian Cup: Semi-finals
- 2026–27 Norwegian Cup: Pre-season
Home colours	Away colours

The 2026 season is the 112th season in the history of Aalesunds Fotballklubb and the first in the Eliteserien since 2023, following promotion. In addition, Aalesund will participate in the 2026–27 Norwegian Football Cup. The team completed its participation in the 2025–26 Norwegian Football Cup by reaching the semi-finals.

== Transfers ==
=== In ===
Pos.	Player	Transferred from	Fee	Date	Source
DF	(Sweden) Emil Engqvist	(Sweden) Sandvikens IF		19 December 2025	
MF	(Norway) Endre Osenbroch	(Norway) Sandnes Ulf		1 January 2026	
FW	(Cameroon) Ivan Djantou	(Denmark) Sønderjyske		12 January 2026	
MF	(Nigeria) Uba Charles Nwokoma	(Norway) Lillestrøm SK		19 March 2026	

=== Out ===
Pos.	Player	Transferred to	Fee	Date	Source
FW	(Denmark) Alexander Ammitzbøll	(Denmark) Esbjerg fB	End of contract	31 December 2025	
DF	(Norway) John Kitolano	(Norway) Lillestrøm	End of contract	31 December 2025	
FW	(Norway) Tellef Brattberg Ytterland	(Norway) Levanger	End of contract	31 December 2025	
DF	(Norway) Erik Ansok Frøysa	(Norway) Raufoss	Loan	31 March 2026	
GK	(Norway) Kristoffer Klaesson	Retiring		30 June 2026	

== Pre-season and friendlies ==
30 January 2026 Friendly	Aalesund (Norway)	1–0	(Norway) Kristiansund

6 February 2026 Friendly	Hødd (Norway)	0–2	(Norway) Aalesund

14 February 2026 Friendly	Sirius (Sweden)	3–3	(Norway) Aalesund

22 February 2026 Friendly	Aalesund (Norway)	2–3	(Norway) Fredrikstad

27 February 2026 Friendly	Molde (Norway)	4–1	(Norway) Aalesund

28 February 2026 Friendly	Aalesund (Norway)	6–1	(Norway) Brattvåg

27 June 2026 Friendly	Kristiansund (Norway)	0–3	(Norway) Aalesund
15:00

== Competitions ==
=== Overall record ===
Competition	First match	Last match	Starting round	Final position	Record							
Competition	First match	Last match	Starting round	Final position	Pld	W	D	L	GF	GA	GD	Win %
Eliteserien	15 March 2026		Matchday 1		11	2	5	4	15	20	−5	18.18
2025–26 Norwegian Football Cup	9 March 2026	22 April 2026	Fourth round	Semi-finals	3	2	0	1	6	5	+1	66.67
2026–27 Norwegian Football Cup					0	0	0	0	0	0	+0	—
Total					14	4	5	5	21	25	−4	28.57

Last updated: 29 May 2026
Source: Competitions

=== Eliteserien ===
Pos	Team	Pld	W	D	L	GF	GA	GD	Pts	Qualification or relegation
11	Brann	12	4	1	7	24	20	+4	13	
12	KFUM	11	3	3	5	12	17	−5	12	
13	Aalesund	11	2	5	4	15	20	−5	11	
14	Kristiansund	11	3	2	6	11	18	−7	11	Qualification for the relegation play-offs
15	Rosenborg	11	2	3	6	9	18	−9	9	Relegation to First Division

Updated to match(es) played on 30 May 2026. Source: Football Association of Norway (in Norwegian)
Rules for classification: 1) Points; 2) Goal difference; 3) Goals scored; 4) Head-to-head points; 5) Head-to-head goal difference; 6) Head-to-head goals scored.

==== Results summary ====
Overall								Home						Away					
Pld	W	D	L	GF	GA	GD	Pts	W	D	L	GF	GA	GD	W	D	L	GF	GA	GD
11	2	5	4	15	20	−5	11	1	3	2	10	12	−2	1	2	2	5	8	−3

Last updated: 29 May 2026.

==== Results by round ====
Round	1	2	3	4	5	6	7	8	9	10	11
Ground	H	A	H	H	A	H	A	H	A	A	H
Result	L	D	L	D	L	D	L	W	W	D	D
Position											

Updated to match(es) played on 29 May 2026. Source:
A = Away; H = Home; W = Win; D = Draw; L = Loss

==== Matches ====
The match schedule was issued on 19 December 2025.

15 March 2026 1	Aalesund	1–3	Lillestrøm

21 March 2026 2	Start	1–1	Aalesund

7 April 2026 3	Aalesund	2–3	Fredrikstad

12 April 2026 4	Aalesund	2–2	KFUM Oslo

18 April 2026 5	Bodø/Glimt	3–0	Aalesund

26 April 2026 6	Aalesund	1–1	Kristiansund

3 May 2026 7	Sandefjord	1–0	Aalesund

16 May 2026 9	Rosenborg	2–3	Aalesund

20 May 2026 8	Aalesund	2–1	Brann

25 May 2026 10	Tromsø	1–1	Aalesund

29 May 2026 11	Aalesund	2–2	HamKam	Ålesund
19:00				Stadium: Color Line Stadion

=== Norwegian Football Cup ===
==== 2025–26 ====
9 March 2026 Fourth round	Egersund	2–3	Aalesund

18 March 2026 Quarter-finals	Viking	1–2	Aalesund

22 April 2026 Semi-finals	Brann	2–1	Aalesund

==== 2026–27 ====
22–23 August 2026 First round	Langevåg	v	Aalesund
