= Uba Charles Nwokoma =

Nigerian footballer (born 2002)

Uba Charles
Personal information
- Full name: Uba Charles Nwokoma
- Date of birth: 10 October 2002 (age 24)
- Position: Midfielder

Team information
- Current team: Aalesund
- Number: 14

Youth career
- –2020: Idol Football Academy

Senior career*
Years	Team	Apps	(Gls)
2021	Linköping City	21	(0)
2022	Ljungskile	27	(2)
2023–2026	Lillestrøm	27	(0)
2023	Lillestrøm 2	10	(2)
2025	→ Mjällby AIF (loan)	12	(1)
2026–	Aalesund	12	(0)
- * Club domestic league appearances and goals as of 23 July 2026

Uba Charles Nwokoma (born 10 October 2002) is a Nigerian footballer who plays as a midfielder for Norwegian side Aalesund in the Eliteserien.

== Career ==
Ahead of the 2021 season in Sweden, Uba Charles Nwokoma went from the Nigerian Idol Football Academy to Swedish team FC Linköping City, where he played 21 matches in the 2021 Ettan.

He joined Ljungskile SK in the 2022 Ettan, and already after a few months he reportedly attracted attention from Swedish top-flight clubs GIF Sundsvall, IFK Göteborg and BK Häcken. However, a Norwegian club won the race to sign Nwokoma. He would join Lillestrøm SK after the 2022 season was over. Lillestrøm had a history of recruiting Nigerian players, of whom Nwokoma was compared to Mathew Ifeanyi.

He made his Lillestrøm debut in March 2023, in the postponed 2022 Norwegian cup match against Sogndal, and was an unused substitute in the 2022 Norwegian Football Cup final. He made his Eliteserien debut in April 2023 against Viking. Not entirely satisfied with the chances given to him in his first season, which impacted him mentally, Nwokoma vowed to be a stronger player in 2024. He missed several games from May to July as he was under scrutiny for a possible heart problem; also he lost his father in the same period.

On 15 March 2025, Charles moved to Sweden to play for Mjällby AIF on a loan-deal until 15 July 2025.

In March 2026, Aalesund announced that they had signed Charles on a two-year contract.

== Career statistics ==
=== Club ===
As of 14 April 2026

Club	Season	League			National Cup (Note: Includes Svenska Cupen, Norwegian Cup)		Total	
Club	Season	Division	Apps	Goals	Apps	Goals	Apps	Goals
Linköping City	2021	Ettan	21	0	0	0	21	0
Ljungskile	2022	Ettan	27	2	1	0	28	2
Lillestrøm	2023	Eliteserien	8	0	4	0	12	0
Lillestrøm	2024	Eliteserien	19	0	4	0	23	0
Lillestrøm	Total		27	0	8	0	35	0
Lillestrøm	2023	Norwegian Third Division	10	2	—		10	2
Mjällby AIF (loan)	2025	Allsvenskan	12	1	1	0	13	1
Aalesund	2026	Eliteserien	3	0	0	0	3	0
Career total			100	5	10	0	110	5

== Honours ==
Mjällby IF

- Allsvenskan: 2025
