= Kristoffer Klaesson =

Norwegian footballer (born 2000)

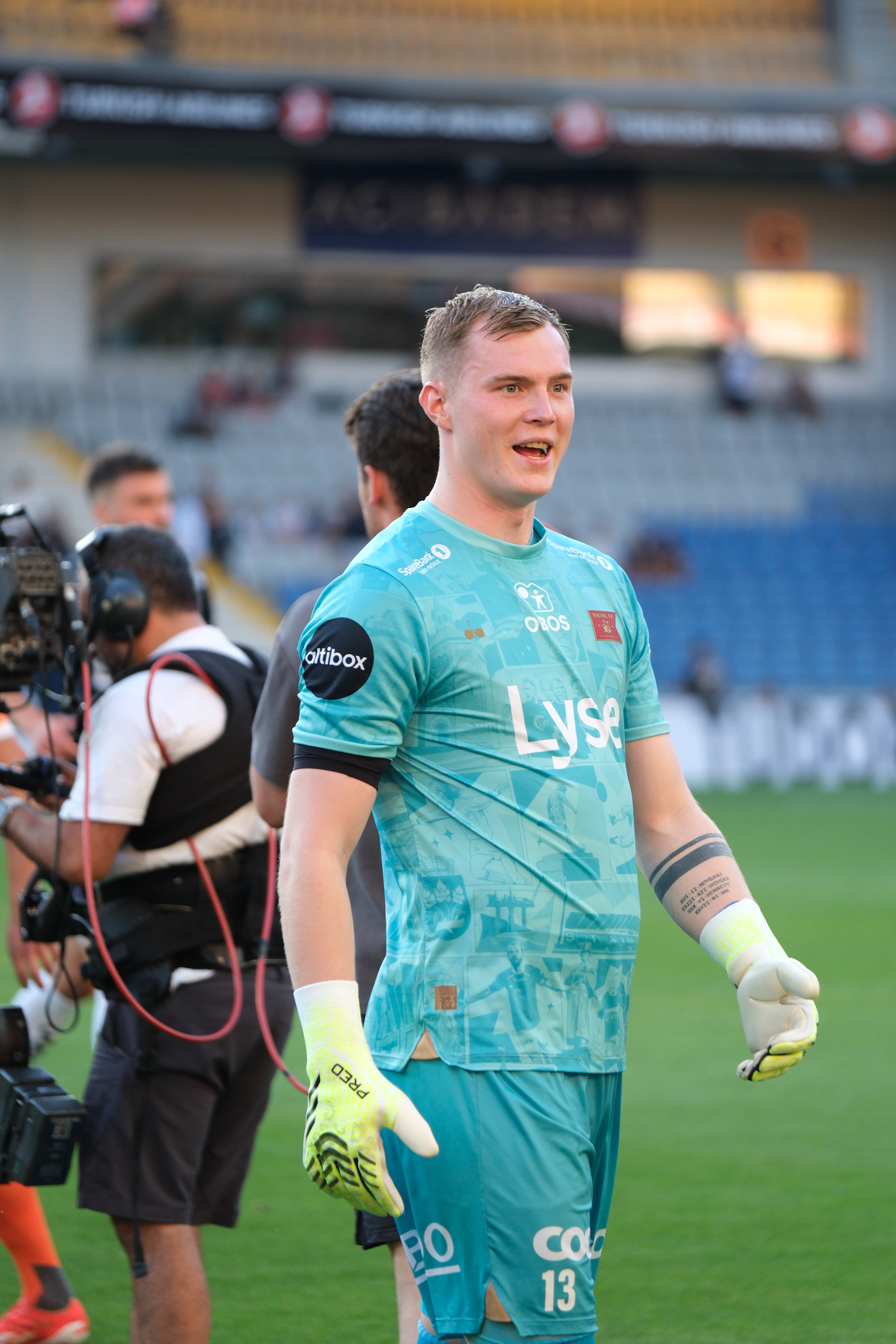
- Klaesson with Viking in 2025

Personal information
- Full name: Kristoffer-August Sundquist Klaesson
- Date of birth: 27 November 2000 (age 25)
- Place of birth: Oslo, Norway
- Height: 1.89 m (6 ft 2 in)
- Position: Goalkeeper

Youth career
- –2015: Vålerenga

Senior career*
Years	Team	Apps	(Gls)
2015–2019	Vålerenga 2	40	(0)
2019–2021	Vålerenga	55	(0)
2021–2024	Leeds United	2	(0)
2024	Raków Częstochowa	0	(0)
2024	Raków Częstochowa II	1	(0)
2024–2025	AGF	0	(0)
2025	Viking	14	(0)
2026	Aalesund	11	(0)
Total		123	(0)

International career
2015	Norway U15	2	(0)
2016	Norway U16	13	(0)
2017	Norway U17	2	(0)
2018	Norway U18	9	(0)
2019	Norway U19	7	(0)
2019–2023	Norway U21	20	(0)
- * Club domestic league appearances and goals

Kristoffer-August Sundquist Klaesson (born 27 November 2000) is a Norwegian former professional footballer who played as a goalkeeper.

Klaesson was Vålerenga's youth academy graduate and played for Norway at youth level.

== Club career ==
=== Vålerenga ===
Klaesson signed his first professional contract in June 2016. He made his Eliteserien debut for Vålerenga on 30 June 2019 against Haugesund, following injury to first choice goalkeeper Adam Larsen Kwarasey. The game ended with a 4–1 win for Vålerenga. Klaesson also started the following game, a 6–0 win against Bodø/Glimt.

=== Leeds United ===
On 31 July 2021, Klaesson signed a four-year deal with Leeds United, with the club paying an undisclosed fee reported as £1.6 million.

He made his Premier League debut on 18 March 2022 in a 3–2 victory away to Wolverhampton Wanderers, following an injury to first choice goalkeeper Illan Meslier. During his time on the pitch, he did not concede any goals.

Klaesson made his first start for the club on 1 January 2024 at home against Birmingham City. He played the full 90 minutes, keeping a clean sheet in the 3–0 win.

=== Raków Częstochowa ===
On 7 July 2024, Klaesson moved on a free transfer to Ekstraklasa club Raków Częstochowa on a three-year contract. Having arrived at the club out of shape, he left Raków by mutual consent on 26 August that year without making a single first-team appearance. According to reports from Polish media outlets, such as Weszło, his exit was allegedly due to concerns over his physical condition, with speculation arising after fans reportedly spotted him at a McDonald's.

=== AGF ===
On 30 September 2024, Klaesson signed a contract with Danish Superliga club AGF until July 2025. He was set to replace backup Leopold Wahlstedt, who had broken his ankle in a match a few days earlier.

=== Viking ===
On 15 January 2025, Klaesson signed a three-year contract with Viking. He made 14 appearances as Viking won the 2025 Eliteserien.

=== Aalesund ===
On 13 January 2026, Klaesson signed a three-year contract with Aalesund.

On 30 June 2026, Klaesson decided to retire from professional football.

== Career statistics ==
Appearances and goals by club, season and competition
Club	Season	League			National cup (Note: Includes FA Cup, Norwegian Football Cup and Danish Cup)		League cup		Europe		Total	
Club	Season	Division	Apps	Goals	Apps	Goals	Apps	Goals	Apps	Goals	Apps	Goals
Vålerenga 2	2015	2. divisjon	3	0	—		—		—		3	0
Vålerenga 2	2016	2. divisjon	1	0	—		—		—		1	0
Vålerenga 2	2017	2. divisjon	12	0	—		—		—		12	0
Vålerenga 2	2018	2. divisjon	18	0	—		—		—		18	0
Vålerenga 2	2019	3. divisjon	6	0	—		—		—		6	0
Vålerenga 2	Total		40	0	—		—		—		40	0
Vålerenga	2019	Eliteserien	12	0	2	0	—		—		14	0
Vålerenga	2020	Eliteserien	29	0	—		—		—		29	0
Vålerenga	2021	Eliteserien	14	0	0	0	—		1 (Note: Appearance(s) in UEFA Conference League)	0	15	0
Vålerenga	Total		55	0	2	0	—		1	0	58	0
Leeds United	2021–22	Premier League	1	0	0	0	0	0	—		1	0
Leeds United	2022–23	Premier League	0	0	0	0	0	0	—		0	0
Leeds United	2023–24	Championship	1	0	1	0	0	0	—		2	0
Leeds United	Total		2	0	1	0	0	0	—		3	0
Raków Częstochowa	2024–25	Ekstraklasa	0	0	0	0	—		—		0	0
Raków Częstochowa II	2024–25	IV liga Silesia	1	0	—		—		—		1	0
AGF	2024–25	Danish Superliga	0	0	1	0	—		—		1	0
Viking	2025	Eliteserien	14	0	2	0	—		3	0	19	0
Aalesund	2026	Eliteserien	11	0	1	0	—		—		12	0
Career total			123	0	7	0	0	0	4	0	134	0

== Honours ==
Viking

- Eliteserien: 2025

Norway U17

- Syrenka Cup: 2016
