= Martin Ove Roseth =

Norwegian footballer (born 1998)

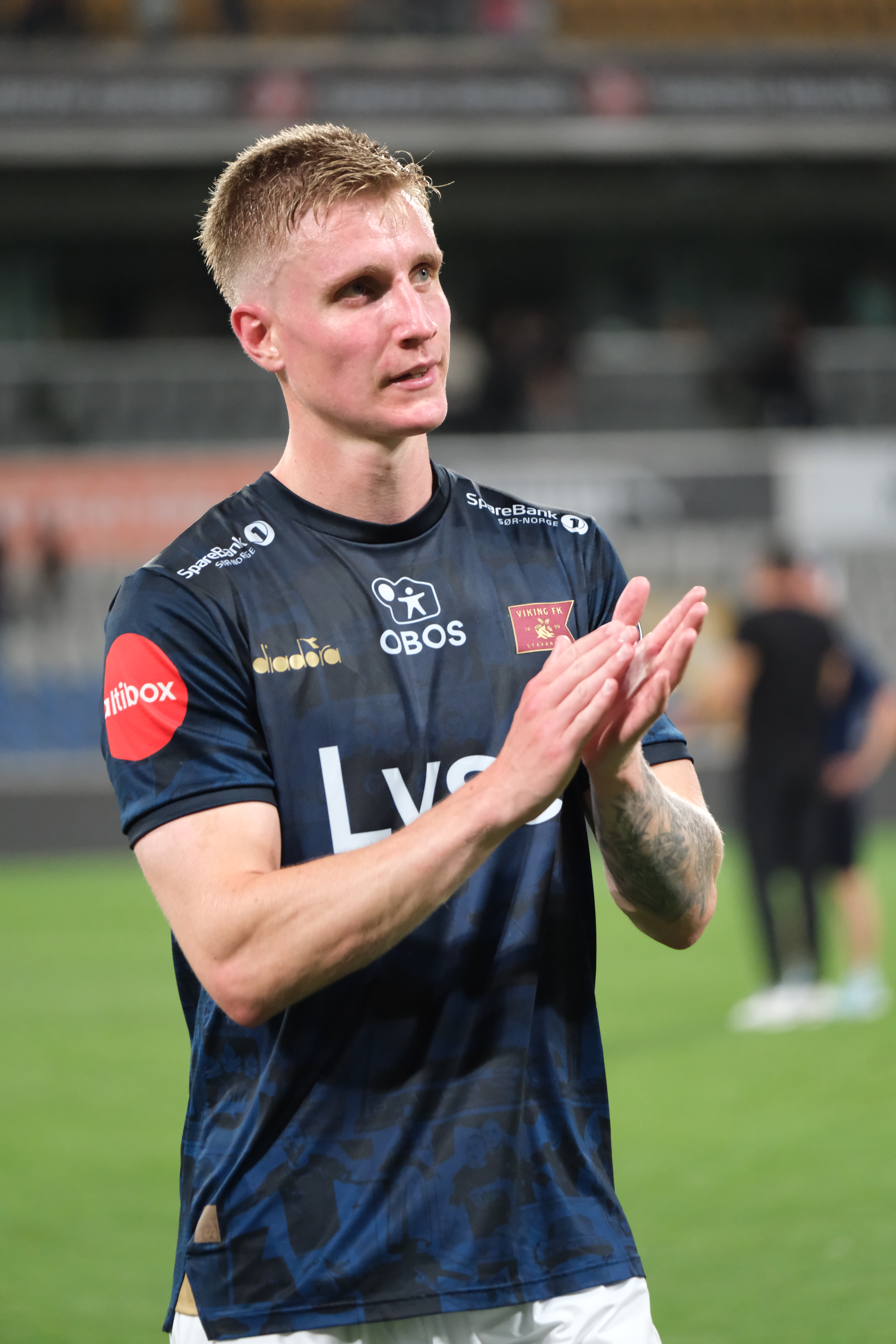

Personal information
- Date of birth: 10 July 1998 (age 28)
- Place of birth: Volda Municipality, Norway
- Height: 1.88 m (6 ft 2 in)
- Position: Centre-back

Team information
- Current team: Viking
- Number: 4

Youth career
- –2013: Volda
- 2014–2016: Molde

Senior career*
Years	Team	Apps	(Gls)
2013–2014	Volda	13	(0)
2015–2020	Molde	1	(0)
2018	→ Levanger (loan)	14	(0)
2019	→ Sogndal (loan)	16	(0)
2020–2022	Sogndal	62	(1)
2023–2025	Lillestrøm	24	(2)
2025–	Viking	20	(4)

International career
2015	Norway U17	3	(0)
2016	Norway U18	10	(1)
- * Club domestic league appearances and goals as of 1 December 2025

Martin Ove Roseth (born 10 July 1998) is a Norwegian professional footballer who plays as a centre-back for Viking.

== Career ==
Roseth hails from Volda Municipality and appeared for Volda TI's senior team in 2013 and 2014 before joining Molde's youth setup. He made his Molde first-team debut in a March 2015 cup game against Brattvåg, and his league debut in August 2016 against Bodø/Glimt. In February 2018, he joined First Division club Levanger on loan until the end of the season.

In June 2020, he signed a two-and-a-half-year contract with First Division club Sogndal, after spending the 2019 season on loan.

In November 2022, he signed a three-year contract with Eliteserien club Lillestrøm.

In February 2025, he signed a four-year contract with Eliteserien club Viking. He made 20 appearances and scored four goals as Viking won the 2025 Eliteserien.

== Career statistics ==
As of match played 30 November 2025

Appearances and goals by club, season and competition
Club	Season	League			National cup		Other		Total	
Club	Season	Division	Apps	Goals	Apps	Goals	Apps	Goals	Apps	Goals
Volda	2013	3. divisjon	4	0	0	0	—		4	0
Volda	2014	4. divisjon	9	0	1	0	—		10	0
Volda	Total		13	0	1	0	—		14	0
Molde	2015	Eliteserien	0	0	1	0	—		1	0
Molde	2016	Eliteserien	1	0	1	0	—		2	0
Molde	2017	Eliteserien	0	0	0	0	—		0	0
Molde	2018	Eliteserien	0	0	0	0	—		0	0
Molde	2019	Eliteserien	0	0	1	0	—		1	0
Molde	Total		1	0	3	0	—		4	0
Levanger (loan)	2018	1. divisjon	14	0	0	0	—		14	0
Sogndal (loan)	2019	1. divisjon	16	0	2	0	1 (Note: Appearance(s) in Eliteserien play-offs)	0	19	0
Sogndal	2020	1. divisjon	27	0	—		—		27	0
Sogndal	2021	1. divisjon	24	0	0	0	1	0	25	0
Sogndal	2022	1. divisjon	11	1	1	0	—		12	1
Sogndal	Total		78	1	3	0	2	0	83	1
Lillestrøm	2023	Eliteserien	9	2	2	0	—		11	2
Lillestrøm	2024	Eliteserien	15	0	3	0	—		18	0
Lillestrøm	Total		24	2	5	0	—		29	2
Viking	2025	Eliteserien	20	4	2	0	2 (Note: Appearances in UEFA Conference League)	0	24	4
Career total			150	7	14	0	4	0	168	7

== Honours ==
Viking

- Eliteserien: 2025
