= Gjermund Åsen =

Norwegian footballer (born 1991)

Personal information
- Full name: Gjermund Åsen
- Date of birth: 22 May 1991 (age 35)
- Place of birth: Trondheim, Norway
- Height: 1.82 m (6 ft 0 in)
- Position: Midfielder

Team information
- Current team: Ranheim
- Number: 23

Youth career
- –2006: Heimdal
- 2006–2009: Strindheim

Senior career*
Years	Team	Apps	(Gls)
–2009	Strindheim		
2010–2011	Rosenborg 2	3	(0)
2010–2012	Rosenborg	21	(0)
2011–2012	→ Ranheim (loan)	19	(3)
2012–2014	Ranheim	67	(18)
2015–2018	Tromsø	100	(10)
2019–2021	Rosenborg	45	(3)
2021	→ Lillestrøm (loan)	26	(2)
2022–2025	Lillestrøm	98	(7)
2025	Lillestrøm 2	1	(0)
2026–	Ranheim	9	(0)

International career^{‡}
2010	Norway U19	5	(0)
2011	Norway U21	1	(0)
- * Club domestic league appearances and goals as of 14 November 2026 ‡ National team caps and goals as of 11 February 2026

Gjermund Åsen (born 22 May 1991) is a Norwegian professional footballer who plays as a midfielder for Ranheim.

== Club career ==
=== Early career ===
Åsen played for Heimdal as a youngster, before moving to Strindheim at the age of fifteen. At Strindheim he played for their youth setup, and by 2008 he was playing for their first team in the Norwegian Second Division. While at Strindheim, Åsen saw interest from both Molde and Dutch Eredivisie side NEC.

=== Rosenborg ===
Åsen was approached by Rosenborg several times about a transfer to the club through the 2009 season. Eventually, late in 2009, Åsen agreed to sign a one-year contract with the club to see how it would work out. He made his Rosenborg debut 7 March 2010 in the Norwegian Superfinalen against Aalesund, coming on for Fredrik Winsnes in the 83rd minute. His first Eliteserien game for the club came a week later in the first league game of the 2010 season against rivals Molde on 14 March 2010.

=== Ranheim ===
Åsen was on two short loan spells at Ranheim in 2011 and 2012, but transferred to Ranheim after his second loan spell on 1 August 2012.

=== Tromsø ===
Ahead of the 2015 season, Åsen signed a two-year contract with Tromsø. As his original contract ended after the 2017 season, and speculations of other clubs approaching Åsen, he signed a new contract with the club in December for another two years. In 2018, Åsen finished the season with ten assists, the most of any player in the 2018 season.

=== Return to Rosenborg ===
On 22 January 2019, after four seasons at Tromsø, Åsen returned to his first professional club Rosenborg, on a four-year contract.

=== Lillestrøm ===
Falling out of favor at Rosenborg, Åsen was loaned out to Lillestrøm ahead of the 2021 season with an option to buy. After the season, in which Åsen would record the most assists in the league with 12, Lillestrøm triggered the option to buy and on 30 November 2021 announced that they had signed Åsen on a permanent deal through the 2023 season. Three months later, in February 2022, ahead of the season, Åsen was selected as the club's captain. In July, Åsen played both games against SJK in the second qualifying round of the UEFA Conference League.

In September 2024, after Lillestrøm had hired their new coach David Nielsen, Åsen was stripped of being captain, in favour of Ruben Gabrielsen. Åsen told the media that it was not unexpected as things changed in football, and that it had been an honour to perform the role of captain as long as he had. Only months later, after poor results throughout the season, Lillestrøm was relegated to the Norwegian First Division, Åsen's first time back in the league since playing for Ranheim. In the final game of the 2025 season Åsen was an unused substitute in the 2025 Norwegian Cup final, where Lillestrøm won their seventh cup title.

=== Return to Ranheim ===
As Åsen's contract with Lillestrøm expired after the 2025 season, Ranheim announced that he would return to the club and that he had signed a two-year contract with the club.

== International career ==
In 2010, Åsen played five games for the Norway U19 team, and a year later, he appeared once for the Norway U19 team.

== Career statistics ==
=== Club ===
As of 14 November 2026

Appearances and goals by club, season and competition
Club	Season	League			National Cup		Europe		Other		Total	
Club	Season	Division	Apps	Goals	Apps	Goals	Apps	Goals	Apps	Goals	Apps	Goals
Rosenborg	2010	Eliteserien	12	0	0	0	0	0	1 (Note: Appearance in Superfinalen)	0	13	0
Rosenborg	2011	Eliteserien	9	0	1	0	0	0	—		10	0
Rosenborg	Total		21	0	1	0	0	0	1	0	23	0
Ranheim (loan)	2011	1. divisjon	9	3	0	0	—		—		9	3
Ranheim (loan)	2012	1. divisjon	10	0	0	0	—		—		10	0
Ranheim (loan)	Total		19	3	0	0	—		—		19	3
Ranheim	2012	1. divisjon	15	3	0	0	—		—		15	3
Ranheim	2013	1. divisjon	22	6	2	1	—		3 (Note: Appearances in 1. divisjon promotion play-offs)	0	27	7
Ranheim	2014	1. divisjon	30	9	3	1	—		—		33	10
Ranheim	Total		67	18	5	2	—		3	0	75	20
Tromsø	2015	Eliteserien	21	3	1	0	—		—		22	3
Tromsø	2016	Eliteserien	29	2	2	0	—		—		31	2
Tromsø	2017	Eliteserien	29	3	2	0	—		—		31	3
Tromsø	2018	Eliteserien	21	2	0	0	—		—		21	2
Tromsø	Total		100	10	5	0	—		—		105	10
Rosenborg	2019	Eliteserien	23	1	3	1	9 (Note: Four appearances in UEFA Champions League, five appearances in UEFA Europa League)	0	—		35	2
Rosenborg	2020	Eliteserien	22	2	—		2 (Note: Appearances in UEFA Europa League)	0	—		24	2
Rosenborg	Total		45	3	3	1	11	0	—		59	4
Lillestrøm (loan)	2021	Eliteserien	26	2	2	0	—		—		28	2
Lillestrøm	2022	Eliteserien	26	2	4	0	2 (Note: Appearances in UEFA Conference League)	0	—		32	2
Lillestrøm	2023	Eliteserien	30	4	4	1	—		—		34	5
Lillestrøm	2024	Eliteserien	28	1	3	3	—		—		31	4
Lillestrøm	2025	1. divisjon	14	0	7	0	—		—		21	0
Lillestrøm	Total		98	7	18	4	2	0	—		118	11
Lillestrøm 2	2025	3. divisjon	1	0	—		—		—		1	0
Ranheim	2026	1. divisjon	9	0	0	0	—		0	0	9	0
Career total			386	43	34	7	13	0	4	0	437	50

== Honours ==
Rosenborg

- Superfinalen: 2010
- Eliteserien: 2010

Lillestrøm

- Norwegian First Division: 2025
- Norwegian Cup: 2025; runner-up: 2022

Individual

- Eliteserien Top assist provider: 2018, 2021
