= Elias Solberg =

Norwegian footballer (born 2004)

Personal information
- Full name: Elias Sebastian Solberg
- Date of birth: 3 March 2004 (age 22)
- Position: Midfielder

Team information
- Current team: Ull/Kisa
- Number: 10

Youth career
- –2020: Ull/Kisa

Senior career*
Years	Team	Apps	(Gls)
2019	Ull/Kisa 2	1	(0)
2020–2021	Ull/Kisa	16	(3)
2021–2022	Juventus Next Gen	0	(0)
2022–2023	Lillestrøm 2	6	(0)
2022–2025	Lillestrøm	1	(0)
2025	→ Eidsvold Turn	5	(1)
2025	→ Eidsvolt Turn 2	1	(0)
2026–	Ull/Kisa	16	(1)

International career^{‡}
2019	Norway U15	6	(0)
2022–	Norway U18	4	(1)
- * Club domestic league appearances and goals as of 15 November 2026 ‡ National team caps and goals as of 10 September 2025

Elias Sebastian Solberg (born 3 March 2004) is a Norwegian footballer playing as a midfielder for Ull/Kisa.

== Club career ==
Having progressed through the youth ranks of Ull/Kisa, Solberg established himself in the first team for the 2020 season, scoring three goals from sixteen appearances. These performances caught the eye of Italian side Juventus, and in July 2021 he signed for The Old Lady. In October 2021, he was named by English newspaper The Guardian as one of the best players born in 2004 worldwide.

In August 2022, having failed to break into the youth sides of Juventus, Solberg returned to Norway to sign for Lillestrøm.

In September 2025, after a short loan spell at Eidsvold Turn, Solberg mutually terminated his contract with Lillestrøm.

== International career ==
Solberg has represented Norway at under-15 and under-18 level.

== Career statistics ==
=== Club ===
As of 10 September 2025

Club	Season	League			National Cup		Total	
Club	Season	Division	Apps	Goals	Apps	Goals	Apps	Goals
Ull/Kisa 2	2019	3. divisjon	1	0	—		1	0
Ull/Kisa	2020	1. divisjon	16	3	—		16	3
Juventus Next Gen	2021–22	Serie C	0	0	—		0	0
Lillestrøm 2	2022	3. divisjon	3	0	—		3	0
Lillestrøm 2	2023	3. divisjon	3	0	—		3	0
Lillestrøm 2	Total		6	0	—		6	0
Lillestrøm	2022	Eliteserien	1	0	0	0	1	0
Lillestrøm	2023	Eliteserien	0	0	0	0	0	0
Lillestrøm	2024	Eliteserien	0	0	0	0	0	0
Lillestrøm	Total		1	0	0	0	1	0
Eidsvold Turn (loan)	2025	2. divisjon	3	0	2	1	5	1
Eidsvold Turn 2 (loan)	2025	4. divisjon	1	0	—		1	0
Career total			28	3	2	1	30	4
