= Jabir Abdihakim Ali =

Swedish footballer (born 1999)

Personal information
- Date of birth: 20 February 1999 (age 27)
- Height: 2.02 m (6 ft 8 in)
- Position: Forward

Team information
- Current team: Östersund
- Number: 22

Youth career
- Husby FF

Senior career*
Years	Team	Apps	(Gls)
2015	Husby FF	6	(1)
2016–2017	Spårvägens FF	7	(0)
2017	Hanvikens SK	4	(1)
2018	Husby FF	5	(3)
2019	FC Stockholm	20	(9)
2020	Huddinge IF	2	(2)
2020–2021	Sollentuna FK	31	(10)
2022	Sandvikens IF	28	(22)
2023–2025	Västerås SK	43	(17)
2024	→ Lillestrøm (loan)	3	(0)
2025–2026	Östersund	11	(5)
2026	Vaasan Palloseura	5	(0)
2026–	Östersund	13	(3)
- * Club domestic league appearances and goals as of 11 November 2026

Jabir Abdihakim Ali (born 20 February 1999) is a Swedish footballer who plays as a forward for Östersund.

== Career ==
Hailing from Husby, Stockholm, he moved around between the lower-league clubs Husby FF (Division 6), Spårvägens FF and Hanvikens SK until 2019, when he scored 9 goals for FC Stockholm. After spending 2020 in both Huddinge IF and Sollentuna FK, he managed to get a small breakthrough and score 9 goals again for Sollentuna in 2021. This earned him a transfer to fellow Division 1 club Sandvikens IF. Ali has stated that the 2019 season gave him the motivation to train harder, and that he is inspired by local footballer Robin Quaison.

In the 2022 Ettan, Ali made his definitive breakthrough as he scored 22 goals in 29 matches. He was noted by media outlets including Aftonbladet as a tank center. Several Sandviken players were bought by larger clubs, including Ali who moved to Västerås SK as the replacement of Viktor Granath.

He made his Superettan debut on 15 April 2023 against Helsingborg. Ali managed to score double digits in the 2023 Superettan as well, securing promotion to 2024 Allsvenskan. In the match that sealed the promotion, at home against GAIS on 29 October 2023, Ali scored both Västerås' goals to clench victory.

He was also noted for having personal supporters from Husby attend certain matches, upwards of 150–200 people. Eventually, the slogan "No Jabir no Party" was printed on clothing and banners. Ali made his Allsvenskan debut on 1 April 2024 against AIK.

On 3 May 2025, Västerås confirmed that Ali's contract had been terminated by mutual agreement.

On 29 July 2025, Ali signed for Östersunds IK on a deal for the rest of 2025. Before signing for Vaasan Palloseura on 2 March 2026.
