= Daniel Skaarud =

Norwegian footballer (born 2007)

Personal information
- Full name: Daniel Johan Skaarud
- Date of birth: 10 September 2007 (age 19)
- Place of birth: Lørenskog, Norway
- Height: 1.76 m (5 ft 9 in)
- Position: Winger

Team information
- Current team: Sandefjord
- Number: 32

Youth career
- –2024: Lillestrøm
- 2024–2026: Ajax

Senior career*
Years	Team	Apps	(Gls)
2022–2024	Lillestrøm	5	(0)
2024–2026	Jong Ajax	0	(0)
2026–	Sandefjord	1	(0)

International career^{‡}
2022	Norway U15	6	(1)
2023	Norway U16	5	(1)
2024	Norway U17	5	(1)
2025–	Norway U18	5	(0)
- * Club domestic league appearances and goals as of 26 July 2026 ‡ National team caps and goals as of 10 June 2025

Daniel Johan Skaarud (born 10 September 2007) is a Norwegian footballer who plays as a winger for Eliteserien side Sandefjord. He is considered a promising young talent known for his dribbling ability.

== Early life ==
Skaarud was born on 10 September 2007 in Lørenskog, Norway. He is of Thai descent through his mother and Norwegian through his father.

== Club career ==
=== Lillestrøm ===
Skaarud joined the youth academy of Norwegian side Lillestrøm. He gained attention when he was included in the first-team matchday squad in October 2022 at the age of fifteen. He made his senior debut for the club in the Norwegian Football Cup later that season. His Eliteserien debut followed during the 2023 season. In total, he made five competitive first-team appearances for Lillestrøm before transferring.

=== Ajax ===
On 11 July 2024, Skaarud signed a three-year contract with Dutch club Ajax, running until 30 June 2027. He initially joined the club's under-19 squad for the 2024–25 season. He featured for Ajax U19 in the UEFA Youth League, gaining European experience at youth level.

== International career ==
Skaarud has represented Norway at multiple youth international levels. He played for the Norway U15 team in 2022, scoring once in six appearances. In 2023, he progressed to the U16 team, scoring once in five games. He subsequently represented the U17 team in 2024, again scoring once in five appearances. In March 2025, Skaarud made his debut for the Norway U18 team.

== Style of play ==
Skaarud mainly operates as a winger, typically deployed on the left flank despite being right-footed. He is known for his technical ability, speed, and dribbling skills.

== Career statistics ==
As of match played 4 April 2025

Appearances and goals by club, season and competition
Club	Season	League			National cup (Note: Includes Norwegian Football Cup)		Europe		Other		Total	
Club	Season	Division	Apps	Goals	Apps	Goals	Apps	Goals	Apps	Goals	Apps	Goals
Lillestrøm	2022	Eliteserien	0	0	1	0	—		—		1	0
Lillestrøm	2023	Eliteserien	4	0	0	0	—		—		4	0
Lillestrøm	Total		4	0	1	0	—		—		5	0
Career total			4	0	1	0	0	0	0	0	5	0
