= Vetle Skjærvik =

Norwegian footballer (born 2000)

Personal information
- Date of birth: 15 September 2000 (age 26)
- Place of birth: Lillehammer, Norway
- Height: 1.84 m (6 ft 0 in)
- Position: Defender

Team information
- Current team: Tromsø
- Number: 4

Youth career
- –2015: Roterud
- 2015–2018: Lillehammer

Senior career*
Years	Team	Apps	(Gls)
2017–2019	Lillehammer	57	(6)
2020–2022	HamKam	69	(1)
2023–2024	Lillestrøm	20	(1)
2024–	Tromsø	71	(4)
- * Club domestic league appearances and goals as of 17 August 2026

Vetle Skjærvik (born 15 September 2000) is a Norwegian footballer who plays as a defender for Tromsø.

== Career ==
Skjærvik played youth football at Roterud and Lillehammer, before starting his senior career with the latter in 2017. After three seasons with Lillehammer, he moved to HamKam in 2020. On 2 April 2022, he made his Eliteserien debut in a 2–2 draw against Lillestrøm.

He was bought by Lillestrøm ahead of the 2023 season, and featured on their losing team in the 2022–23 Norwegian Football Cup final.

== Career statistics ==
As of 17 August 2026

Appearances and goals by club, season and competition
Club	Season	League			National cup		Europe		Total	
Club	Season	Division	Apps	Goals	Apps	Goals	Apps	Goals	Apps	Goals
Lillehammer	2017	2. divisjon	16	1	0	0	—		16	1
Lillehammer	2018	4. divisjon	20	1	3	0	—		23	1
Lillehammer	2019	4. divisjon	21	4	0	0	—		21	4
Lillehammer	Total		57	6	3	0	—		60	6
HamKam	2020	1. divisjon	22	0	—		—		22	0
HamKam	2021	1. divisjon	21	1	3	0	—		24	1
HamKam	2022	Eliteserien	26	0	3	0	—		29	0
HamKam	Total		69	1	6	0	—		75	1
Lillestrøm	2023	Eliteserien	20	1	3	0	—		23	1
Tromsø	2024	Eliteserien	28	1	2	0	4 (Note: Appearances in UEFA Conference League)	0	34	1
Tromsø	2025	Eliteserien	28	2	2	0	—		30	2
Tromsø	2026	Eliteserien	15	1	1	0	3 (Note: Two Appearances in UEFA Europa League and one appearances in UEFA Conference League)	0	19	1
Tromsø	Total		71	4	5	0	7	0	83	4
Career total			217	12	17	0	7	0	241	12

== Honours ==
Individual

- Norwegian First Division Young Player of the Month: June 2021
