= Ruben Gabrielsen =

Norwegian footballer (born 1992)

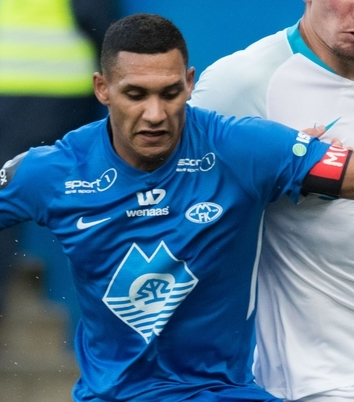
- Gabrielsen with Molde in 2018

Personal information
- Full name: Lunan Ruben Gabrielsen
- Date of birth: 10 March 1992 (age 34)
- Place of birth: Romsås, Norway
- Height: 1.87 m (6 ft 2 in)
- Position: Centre-back

Team information
- Current team: Lillestrøm
- Number: 28

Youth career
- Kapp
- –2007: Toten

Senior career*
| Years | Team | Apps | (Gls) |
| 2007–2008 | Gjøvik-Lyn | 10 | (3) |
| 2009–2014 | Lillestrøm | 63 | (3) |
| 2014–2019 | Molde | 132 | (8) |
| 2020–2022 | Toulouse | 45 | (2) |
| 2021–2022 | → Copenhagen (loan) | 4 | (0) |
| 2022 | Austin FC | 33 | (2) |
| 2023– | Lillestrøm | 98 | (6) |

International career^{‡}
| 2007 | Norway U15 | 4 | (0) |
| 2008 | Norway U16 | 10 | (1) |
| 2009 | Norway U17 | 10 | (3) |
| 2010 | Norway U18 | 7 | (0) |
| 2010–2011 | Norway U19 | 10 | (0) |
| 2012 | Norway U20 | 2 | (1) |
| 2014 | Norway U21 | 1 | (0) |
| 2015 | Norway U23 | 1 | (0) |
| 2020–2021 | Norway | 2 | (0) |
Medal record
Molde
| Winner | Tippeligaen | 2014 |
| Winner | Norwegian Football Cup | 2014 |
| Winner | Eliteserien | 2019 |
Copenhagen
| Winner | Danish Superliga | 2022 |
- * Club domestic league appearances and goals as of 12 September 2026 ‡ National team caps and goals as of 11 October 2021

Lunan Ruben Gabrielsen (born 10 March 1992) is a Norwegian professional footballer who plays as a centre-back for Lillestrøm.

== Club career ==
=== Early career ===
He started his career in Kapp IF, always playing with the older teams. Toten came to collect him, and went from there to Gjøvik-Lyn. After half a season on the senior team he was signed by Lillestrøm, featuring for their B team in the 2. divisjon.

=== Lillestrøm ===
On 4 April 2009, Gabrielsen became the youngest ever Lillestrøm player to debut in the Eliteserien in a game against Aalesunds at the age of 17 years and 25 days.

=== Molde ===
In July 2014, Gabrielsen joined Molde and signed a two-and-a-half-year contract with the club. He made his debut in the first leg of the UEFA Europa League third qualifying round tie against Zorya Luhansk on 31 July 2014. With Molde, Gabrielsen won a double in the 2014 season after Molde became champions of both the 2014 Tippeligaen and the 2014 Norwegian Football Cup. In February 2017, Gabrielsen extended his contract till the end of the 2019 season. In 2017, Gabrielsen succeeded Joona Toivio as club captain. After the end of the 2019 season, he left the club on a free transfer.

=== Toulouse ===
On 23 December 2019, Gabrielsen signed a three-year contract with Toulouse.

On 31 August 2021, Gabrielsen joined Danish side Copenhagen on a loan until 31 December 2021.

=== Austin FC ===
On 24 January 2022, Gabrielsen signed a two-year deal with Major League Soccer club Austin FC ahead of their 2022 season.

=== Return to Lillestrøm ===
On 5 January 2023, Gabrielsen was transferred to Lillestrøm for his second spell at the club.

== International career ==
Gabrielsen was born in Norway to a Cameroonian father and Norwegian mother. Gabrielsen was called up to the senior Norway squad for a friendly against Belgium in June 2016.

== Career statistics ==
As of 12 September 2026

Appearances and goals by club, season and competition
| Club | Season | League | | | National cup (Note: Includes Norwegian Cup, Coupe de France, Danish Cup, U.S. Open Cup) | | Continental | | Other | | Total | |
| Club | Season | Division | Apps | Goals | Apps | Goals | Apps | Goals | Apps | Goals | Apps | Goals |
|---|---|---|---|---|---|---|---|---|---|---|---|---|
| Lillestrøm | 2009 | Tippeligaen | 6 | 0 | 1 | 0 | — | | — | | 7 | 0 |
| Lillestrøm | 2010 | Tippeligaen | 3 | 0 | 0 | 0 | — | | — | | 3 | 0 |
| Lillestrøm | 2011 | Tippeligaen | 24 | 1 | 3 | 0 | — | | — | | 27 | 1 |
| Lillestrøm | 2012 | Tippeligaen | 16 | 0 | 3 | 1 | — | | — | | 19 | 1 |
| Lillestrøm | 2013 | Tippeligaen | 0 | 0 | 0 | 0 | — | | — | | 0 | 0 |
| Lillestrøm | 2014 | Tippeligaen | 14 | 2 | 4 | 0 | — | | — | | 18 | 2 |
| Lillestrøm | Total | | 63 | 3 | 11 | 1 | — | | — | | 74 | 4 |
| Molde | 2014 | Tippeligaen | 10 | 0 | 1 | 0 | 1 (Note: Appearance(s) in UEFA Europa League) | 0 | — | | 12 | 0 |
| Molde | 2015 | Tippeligaen | 15 | 1 | 4 | 0 | 11 (Note: Four appearances in UEFA Champions League, seven appearances in UEFA Europa League) | 0 | — | | 30 | 1 |
| Molde | 2016 | Tippeligaen | 29 | 0 | 1 | 0 | 2 | 0 | — | | 32 | 0 |
| Molde | 2017 | Eliteserien | 27 | 3 | 3 | 0 | — | | — | | 30 | 3 |
| Molde | 2018 | Eliteserien | 25 | 2 | 1 | 0 | 8 | 0 | — | | 34 | 2 |
| Molde | 2019 | Eliteserien | 26 | 2 | 2 | 0 | 5 | 0 | — | | 33 | 2 |
| Molde | Total | | 132 | 8 | 12 | 0 | 27 | 0 | 0 | 0 | 171 | 8 |
| Toulouse | 2019–20 | Ligue 1 | 8 | 0 | 1 | 0 | — | | — | | 9 | 0 |
| Toulouse | 2020–21 | Ligue 2 | 31 | 1 | 2 | 0 | — | | 2 (Note: Appearances in Ligue 1 relegation/promotion play-offs) | 0 | 35 | 1 |
| Toulouse | 2021–22 | Ligue 2 | 6 | 1 | 0 | 0 | — | | — | | 6 | 1 |
| Toulouse | Total | | 45 | 2 | 3 | 0 | — | | 2 | 0 | 50 | 2 |
| Copenhagen (loan) | 2021–22 | Danish Superliga | 4 | 0 | 1 | 0 | 2 (Note: Appearances in UEFA Conference League) | 0 | — | | 7 | 0 |
| Austin FC | 2022 | Major League Soccer | 33 | 2 | 1 | 0 | — | | 3 (Note: Appearances in MLS Cup Playoffs) | 0 | 37 | 2 |
| Lillestrøm | 2023 | Eliteserien | 26 | 1 | 6 | 0 | — | | — | | 32 | 1 |
| Lillestrøm | 2024 | Eliteserien | 28 | 3 | 4 | 1 | — | | — | | 32 | 3 |
| Lillestrøm | 2025 | OBOS-ligaen | 28 | 1 | 9 | 1 | — | | — | | 37 | 2 |
| Lillestrøm | 2026 | Eliteserien | 16 | 1 | 0 | 0 | 2 (Note: Appearances in UEFA Europa League) | 0 | — | | 18 | 1 |
| Lillestrøm | Total | | 98 | 6 | 19 | 2 | 2 | 0 | — | | 119 | 8 |
| Career total | | | 375 | 21 | 47 | 3 | 31 | 0 | 5 | 0 | 458 | 24 |

== Honours ==
Molde FK

- Tippeligaen/Eliteserien: 2014, 2019
- Norwegian Cup: 2014

F.C. Copenhagen

- Danish Superliga: 2022

Lillestrøm

- Norwegian First Division: 2025
- Norwegian Football Cup: 2025
