= Akor Adams =

Nigerian footballer (born 2000)

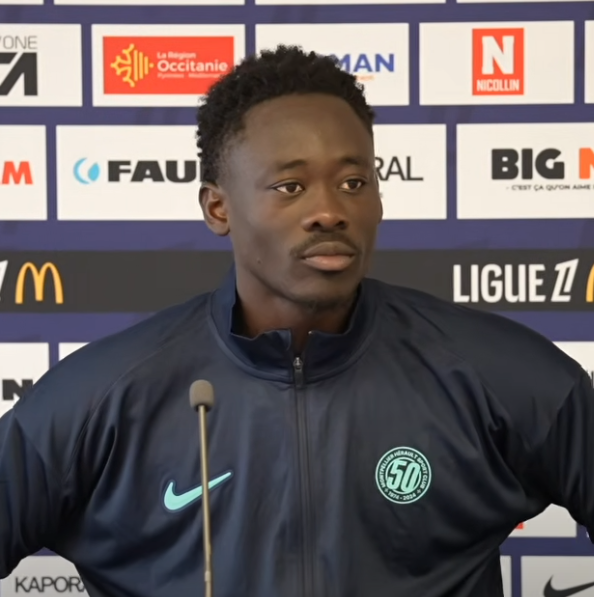
- Adams with Montpellier in 2024

Personal information
- Full name: Akor Jerome Adams
- Date of birth: 29 January 2000 (age 26)
- Place of birth: Kogi State, Nigeria
- Height: 1.90 m (6 ft 3 in)
- Position: Striker

Team information
- Current team: Venezia
- Number: 45

Youth career
- Jamba Football Academy

Senior career*
Years	Team	Apps	(Gls)
2018–2021	Sogndal	50	(14)
2022–2023	Lillestrøm	38	(23)
2023–2025	Montpellier	47	(11)
2025–2026	Sevilla	36	(10)
2026–	Venezia	7	(2)

International career^{‡}
2019	Nigeria U20	2	(0)
2025–	Nigeria	20	(7)
Medal record
Men's football
Representing Nigeria
Africa Cup of Nations
Third place	2025 Morocco
- * Club domestic league appearances and goals as of 05:41, 18 October 2026 (UTC) ‡ National team caps and goals as of 18:45, 17 November 2026 (UTC)

Akor Jerome Adams (born 29 January 2000) is a Nigerian professional footballer who plays as a striker for Serie A club Venezia and the Nigeria national team.

== Club career ==
=== Sogndal ===
In August 2018, Adams joined Norwegian side Sogndal from Jamba Football Academy in Nigeria. He made his debut for the club on 28 August 2018. He missed much of the 2020 season due to injury. His contract with Sogndal expired at the end of the 2021 season. He ended the season with 10 goals in 28 games.

=== Lillestrøm ===
On 2 December 2021, Adams signed a three-year contract with Lillestrøm. He made his competitive debut in the Norwegian Football Cup, scoring against Nardo. He made his Eliteserien debut on 2 April 2022 against HamKam, scoring one of the goals in a 2–2 draw. Adams scored 28 goals in 50 appearances for Lillestrøm SK across all competitions.

=== Montpellier ===
On 7 August 2023, Adams joined Ligue 1 club Montpellier for a reported fee of €4 million. Akor Adams scored 11 goals in all competitions during his time at Montpellier HSC (from August 2023 to January 2025).

=== Sevilla ===
On 27 January 2025, Adams joined La Liga side Sevilla for a reported €5 million fee, signing a four-and-a-half-year contract. His first goal for the club came on 28 September 2025, a late match-winner away against Rayo Vallecano in a 1–0 victory. He repeated the feat the following week in their next match against Barcelona, scoring his team's fourth goal in a 4–1 win against the Catalans. On 14 December, he scored a goal and had an assist in a 4–0 win against Oviedo, earning La Liga MVP honors for the match.

During his first season with Sevilla, Adams made a total of 32 appearances, scoring 10 goals and providing three assists across all competitions. He was nominated for the 2025/26 La Liga African MVP award, but lost to Pape Gueye. In June 2026, amid transfer speculation linking him with clubs like Marseille and Lyon, Adams publicly denied the exit rumors, stating that his sole focus remained on the upcoming season with Sevilla under manager Luis García.

=== Venezia ===
On 22 July 2026, Adams joined Serie A team Venezia on a four year deal for a reported club record €17 million fee plus potential bonuses.The move was endorsed by former Nigeria international Sam Sodje, who said that the decision could have been influenced by Venezia's long-term project. Sodje stated that a player's choice of club could depend on the project presented to him rather than the club's current status.

Adams made his Serie A debut on 23 August 2026 in a 2–0 loss to Lecce. He scored his first goal for Venezia on 11 September in a 4–2 loss against Fiorentina.

== International career ==
Adams featured for the Nigeria under-20 team at the 2019 FIFA U-20 World Cup, bowing out in the last 16 to Senegal on a 2–1 scoreline. On 4 October 2025, Adams was handed his first call-up to the senior Nigerian team for two 2026 FIFA World Cup qualifying matches against Lesotho and Benin, scoring on his debut as substitute against Lesotho.

On December 11, 2025, Adams became part of the Nigerian roster for the 2025 Africa Cup of Nations held in Morocco, where he secured a bronze medal. He scored two goals in the tournament, both of them in the knockout stage.

== Player profile ==
=== Style of play ===
Adams is a physically dominant striker who can play as a target man or supporting forward. His 190 cm height combined with his leaping ability make him a strong aerial threat, winning an average of 2.74 aerial duels per game in the 2025–26 season, placing him in the top tier among European forwards. While primarily right footed, Adams possesses a powerful shot with either foot, preferring power to placement. Due to his physical strength, Adams has excellent hold-up play. At Sevilla, he stated that likes to run in space and to help take pressure off the team. Adams is particularly dangerous on the counterattack where he can use his pace against opposition defences. Defensively he is known for his pressing ability and positional awareness.

=== Reception ===
Nigeria national team manager Eric Chelle described Adams as a player with "amazing physical capacity", who brings a lot of movement on the pitch and can make others shine. International teammate Ademola Lookman stated Adams is a strong player who has a great understanding of the game. According to Lookman, Adams is not just a number 9, as there are many different elements to his game. Former Nigeria manager José Peseiro called Adams "a tank", saying that when he is in the box, defenders have to make a choice to fight him and lose the duel or back off and let him shoot. Olivier Dall'Oglio, who coached Adams at Montpellier said he reminds him of old school number nines: "He doesn't want to dribble you, he wants to run through you. His time in Norway taught him to be direct".

== Personal life ==
Adams was born in Kogi State, Nigeria. His father Joseph was a school teacher in physical education. Adams is a devout Christian who frequently shares his faith and credits Jesus Christ for his success in football.

== Career statistics ==
=== Club ===
As of match played 17 October 2026

Appearances and goals by club, season and competition
Club	Season	League			National cup (Note: Includes Norwegian Cup, Coupe de France, Copa del Rey, Coppa Italia)		Europe		Other		Total	
Club	Season	Division	Apps	Goals	Apps	Goals	Apps	Goals	Apps	Goals	Apps	Goals
Sogndal	2018	Norwegian First Division	10	1	0	0	—		1 (Note: Appearance(s) in Eliteserien play-offs)	0	11	1
Sogndal	2019	Norwegian First Division	12	3	0	0	—		1	0	13	3
Sogndal	2020	Norwegian First Division	2	0	—		—		2	2	4	2
Sogndal	2021	Norwegian First Division	26	10	1	0	—		1	0	28	10
Sogndal	Total		50	14	1	0	—		5	2	56	16
Lillestrøm	2022	Eliteserien	23	8	5	2	1 (Note: Appearance in UEFA Europa Conference League)	0	—		29	10
Lillestrøm	2023	Eliteserien	15	15	5	3	0	0	—		20	18
Lillestrøm	Total		38	23	10	5	1	0	—		49	28
Montpellier	2023–24	Ligue 1	32	8	1	2	—		—		33	10
Montpellier	2024–25	Ligue 1	15	3	1	0	—		—		16	3
Montpellier	Total		47	11	2	2	—		—		49	13
Sevilla	2024–25	La Liga	4	0	—		—		—		4	0
Sevilla	2025–26	La Liga	32	10	1	0	—		—		33	10
Sevilla	Total		36	10	1	0	—		—		37	10
Venezia	2026–27	Serie A	7	2	2	2	—		—		9	4
Career total			178	60	16	9	1	0	5	2	200	71

=== International ===
As of match played 17 November 2026

Appearances and goals by national team and year
National team	Year	Apps	Goals
Nigeria	2025	7	2
Nigeria	2026	13	5
Total		20	7

Scores and results list Nigeria's goal tally first, score column indicates score after each Adams goal.

List of international goals scored by Akor Adams
No.	Date	Venue	Opponent	Score	Result	Competition
1	10 October 2025	Peter Mokaba Stadium, Polokwane, South Africa	Lesotho	2–0	2–1	2026 FIFA World Cup qualification
2	13 November 2025	Moulay Hassan Stadium, Rabat, Morocco	Gabon	1–0	4–1 (a.e.t.)	2026 FIFA World Cup qualification
3	5 January 2026	Fez Stadium, Fez, Morocco	Mozambique	4–0	4–0	2025 Africa Cup of Nations
4	10 January 2026	Marrakesh Stadium, Marrakesh, Morocco	Algeria	2–0	2–0	2025 Africa Cup of Nations
5	27 March 2026	Mardan Sports Complex, Antalya, Turkey	Iran	2–0	2–1	2026 Jordan International Tournament
6	10 June 2026	Estádio Dr. Magalhães Pessoa, Leiria, Portugal	Portugal	1–1	1–2	Friendly
7	6 October 2026	Nizhny Novgorod Stadium, Nizhny Novgorod, Russia	Russia	3–3	3–3	Friendly

== Honours ==
Nigeria

- Africa Cup of Nations third place: 2025
