= Vebjørn Hoff =

Norwegian footballer (born 1996)

Personal information
- Full name: Vebjørn Alvestad Hoff
- Date of birth: 13 February 1996 (age 30)
- Place of birth: Ålesund, Norway
- Height: 1.81 m (5 ft 11 in)
- Position: Midfielder

Team information
- Current team: Molde
- Number: 15

Youth career
- –2011: Spjelkavik
- 2012–2013: Aalesund

Senior career*
Years	Team	Apps	(Gls)
–2011	Spjelkavik		
2014–2018	Aalesund	82	(3)
2018–2021	Odd	83	(4)
2021–2023	Rosenborg	26	(0)
2022	→ Odd (loan)	11	(3)
2023–2026	Lillestrøm	76	(1)
2026–	Molde	1	(0)

International career
2013	Norway U17	3	(0)
2014	Norway U18	13	(0)
2015	Norway U19	2	(0)
2017–2018	Norway U21	8	(0)
- * Club domestic league appearances and goals as of 3 March 2026

Vebjørn Alvestad Hoff (born 13 February 1996) is a Norwegian football midfielder who currently plays for Eliteserien side Molde.

He started his career in Spjelkavik, representing their senior team. In 2012, he joined the regional great team Aalesund, but did not make his league debut until July 2014 against Stabæk.

He has represented Norway as a youth international.

== Career statistics ==
=== Club ===
As of match played 6 December 2025

Appearances and goals by club, season and competition
Club	Season	League			National Cup		Europe		Total	
Club	Season	Division	Apps	Goals	Apps	Goals	Apps	Goals	Apps	Goals
Aalesund	2014	Tippeligaen	2	0	0	0	-		2	0
Aalesund	2015	Tippeligaen	25	0	1	0	-		26	0
Aalesund	2016	Tippeligaen	27	1	2	0	-		29	1
Aalesund	2017	Eliteserien	28	2	4	0	-		32	2
Aalesund	Total		82	3	7	0	-	-	89	3
Odd	2018	Eliteserien	27	0	3	0	-		30	0
Odd	2019	Eliteserien	29	2	5	2	-		34	4
Odd	2020	Eliteserien	27	2	0	0	-		27	2
Odd	Total		83	4	8	2	-	-	91	6
Rosenborg	2021	Eliteserien	16	0	2	0	5	0	23	0
Rosenborg	2022	Eliteserien	10	0	3	1	0	0	13	1
Rosenborg	2023	Eliteserien	0	0	1	0	0	0	1	0
Rosenborg	Total		26	0	6	1	5	0	37	1
Odd (loan)	2022	Eliteserien	11	3	1	0	-		12	3
Odd (loan)	Total		11	3	1	0	-	-	12	3
Lillestrøm	2023	Eliteserien	29	0	3	0	-		32	0
Lillestrøm	2024	Eliteserien	19	0	3	0	-		22	0
Lillestrøm	2025	OBOS-ligaen	28	1	7	0	-		35	1
Lillestrøm	Total		76	1	13	0	-	-	88	1
Molde	2026	Eliteserien	0	0	0	0	-		0	0
Molde	Total		0	0	0	0	-	-	0	0
Career total			278	11	35	3	5	0	318	14

== Honours ==
Lillestrøm

- Norwegian First Division: 2025
- Norwegian Football Cup: 2025
