= Knut André Skjærstein =

Norwegian footballer (born 1995)

Personal information
- Full name: Knut André Søyland Skjærstein
- Date of birth: 6 July 1995 (age 31)
- Height: 1.90 m (6 ft 3 in)
- Position: Goalkeeper

Team information
- Current team: Strømmen
- Number: 1

Youth career
- –2013: Kolbotn
- 2014: Follo

Senior career*
Years	Team	Apps	(Gls)
2014–2017	Follo	53	(0)
2018–2021	KFUM	71	(0)
2021–2023	Lillestrøm	4	(0)
2023	→ Egersund (loan)	9	(0)
2024	Egersund	18	(0)
2025	Kristiansund	6	(0)
2026–	Strømmen	1	(0)
- * Club domestic league appearances and goals as of 15 April 2026

Knut André Skjærstein (born 6 July 1995) is a Norwegian footballer who plays as a goalkeeper for Strømmen IF.

== Career ==
He hails from Kolbotn and played for Kolbotn until the age of 19. He then joined the umbrella team in the region, Follo FK, where he made his senior debut in September 2014. In 2018 he moved on to promotion chasers in the 2. divisjon, KFUM. The team won promotion and established themselves in the 1. divisjon.

In January 2020 he was on trial with Eliteserien team Aalesund. He was eventually signed to the first tier by Lillestrøm SK in August 2021.

He made his Eliteserien debut in September 2021 against Brann. However he did not break through and was loaned out to Egersund in 2023. After they secured promotion to the 2024 1. divisjon, the move was made permanent. He was their first-choice goalkeeper until a blood clot hospitalized him and halted his career.

He was released and spent the first half of 2025 without a club. In June 2025, he was picked up by Eliteserien club Kristiansund BK who faced a crisis with their existing goalkeepers being injured. He made his KBK debut against Rosenborg. Then, in the 2025 cup tie against Stabæk, Skjærstein became the "hero" by saving two efforts in the penalty shootout. After Kristiansund's other goalkeepers returnd from injury, Skjærstein moved on and signed for Strømmen in 2026.
